= 2026 Davis Cup =

113th edition of the Davis Cup

Details
- Duration: 6 February – 29 November 2026
- Edition: 114th

Champion

The 2026 Davis Cup is the 114th edition of the Davis Cup, a tournament between national teams in men's tennis. It is part of the 2026 ATP Tour calendar.

== Finals ==
Date: 24–29 November 2026
Venue: SuperTennis Arena Bologna Fiera, Bologna, Italy
Surface: Hard indoor

The Finals will feature the host nation (Italy) and the seven winners from the Qualifiers second round.
H = Host

Participating teams
Austria	Canada	Czech Republic	Germany
Great Britain	Italy (H)	South Korea	Spain

=== Bracket ===
Quarterfinals
1	Italy
South Korea
Canada
4	Czech Republic
3	Germany
Great Britain
Austria
2	Spain

Semifinals

Final

== Qualifiers ==
=== Bracket ===
First round
Chile (c)	4
14	Serbia	0

Second round
1	Spain	4
Chile (c)	0

First round
2	Germany (c)	4
Peru	0
Denmark	1
13	Croatia (c)	3

Second round
2	Germany (c)	3
13	Croatia	1

First round
3	Australia	1
Ecuador (c)	3
Norway (c)	0
12	Great Britain	4

Second round
Ecuador	0
12	Great Britain (c)	4

First round
4	Belgium	4
Bulgaria (c)	0
Japan (c)	2
11	Austria	3

Second round
4	Belgium	1
11	Austria (c)	3

First round
5	Netherlands	2
India (c)	3
South Korea (c)	3
10	Argentina	2

Second round
India	1
South Korea (c)	3

First round
6	United States	4
Hungary (c)	0
Sweden	1
9	Czech Republic (c)	3

Second round
6	United States	2
9	Czech Republic (c)	3

First round
7	France (c)	3
Slovakia	1
Brazil	2
8	Canada (c)	3

Second round
7	France	1
8	Canada (c)	3

- (c) = choice of ground

=== Second round ===
Date: 18–20 September 2026

Fourteen teams played for seven spots in the Finals, in series decided on a home and away basis.

The qualification is as follows:

- The runners-up of the 2025 Davis Cup (Spain; promoted since 2025 champions Italy will host the Finals)
- 13 winners of the Qualifiers first round, held in February 2026

The 7 winning teams will play in the Finals alongside the host nation Italy.

Home team	Score	Away team	Location	Venue	Surface
Chile	0–4	Spain [1]	Santiago	Estadio Nacional	Clay
Germany [2]	3–1	Croatia [13]	Halle	Heristo Arena	Hard (i)
Great Britain [12]	4–0	Ecuador	London	Copper Box Arena	Hard (i)
Austria [11]	3–1	Belgium [4]	Vienna	Vienna Athletic Sports Club	Clay (i)
South Korea	3–1	India	Seoul	Seoul Olympic Park Tennis Center	Hard
Czech Republic [9]	3–2	United States [6]	Prague	O_{2} Arena	Hard (i)
Canada [8]	3–1	France [7]	Quebec City	Centre Vidéotron	Hard (i)

=== First round ===
Date: 5–8 February 2026

Twenty-six teams will play for thirteen spots in the Qualifiers second Round, in series decided on a home and away basis.

These twenty-six teams are:

- 6 teams from the 2025 Finals, excluding the Finals host nation and defending champion Italy and runner-up Spain
- 7 losing teams from the 2025 Davis Cup Qualifiers second round
- 13 winning teams from the 2025 World Group I

The 13 winning teams will play at the Qualifiers second round and the 13 losing teams will play at the World Group I.

#: Nations Ranking as of 24 November 2025.

Seeded teams

1. Germany (#2)
2. Australia (#4)
3. Belgium (#5)
4. Netherlands (#6)
5. United States (#7)
6. France (#8)
7. Canada (#9)
8. Czech Republic (#10)
9. Argentina (#10)
10. Austria (#12)
11. Great Britain (#13)
12. Croatia (#14)
13. Serbia (#15)

Unseeded teams

- Hungary (#16)
- Brazil (#18)
- Chile (#19)
- Denmark (#20)
- Slovakia (#21)
- South Korea (#22)
- Japan (#23)
- Sweden (#24)
- Norway (#26)
- Peru (#29)
- India (#33)
- Bulgaria (#34)
- Ecuador (#37)

Home team	Score	Away team	Location	Venue	Surface
Germany [1]	4–0	Peru	Düsseldorf	Castello Düsseldorf	Hard (i)
Ecuador	3–1	Australia [2]	Quito	Quito Tennis and Golf Club	Clay
Bulgaria	0–4	Belgium [3]	Plovdiv	Kolodruma	Clay (i)
India	3–2	Netherlands [4]	Bengaluru	Karnataka State Lawn Tennis Association	Hard
Hungary	0–4	United States [5]	Tatabánya	Multifunkcionális Sportcsarnok	Clay (i)
France [6]	3–1	Slovakia	Le Portel	Le Chaudron	Hard (i)
Canada [7]	3–2	Brazil	Vancouver	Thunderbird Sports Centre	Hard (i)
Czech Republic [8]	3–1	Sweden	Jihlava	Horácká aréna	Hard (i)
South Korea	3–2	Argentina [9]	Busan	Gijang Stadium	Hard (i)
Japan	2–3	Austria [10]	Tokyo	Ariake Coliseum	Hard (i)
Norway	0–4	Great Britain [11]	Oslo	Nadderud Arena	Hard (i)
Croatia [12]	3–1	Denmark	Varaždin	Varaždin Arena	Hard (i)
Chile	4–0	Serbia [13]	Santiago	Estadio Nacional	Clay

== World Group I ==
Date: 18–20 September 2026

Twenty-six teams will participate in the World Group I, in series decided on a home and away basis.

These twenty-six teams are:

- 13 losing teams from the Qualifiers first round, held in February 2026
- 13 winning teams from the World Group I play-offs, held in February 2026

The 13 winning teams from the World Group I will play in the Qualifiers first round and the 13 losing teams will play in the World Group I play-offs in 2027.

#: Nations Ranking as of 9 February 2026.

Seeded teams

1. Australia (#8)
2. Argentina (#10)
3. Netherlands (#11)
4. Hungary (#17)
5. Brazil (#18)
6. Finland (#20)
7. Denmark (#21)
8. Serbia (#22)
9. Slovakia (#24)
10. Japan (#25)
11. Norway (#26)
12. Sweden (#27)
13. Peru (#28)

Unseeded teams

- Poland (#29)
- Switzerland (#30)
- Bulgaria (#31)
- Chinese Taipei (#32)
- Turkey (#33)
- Colombia (#34)
- Monaco (#35)
- Lithuania (#36)
- Greece (#37)
- Luxembourg (=#39)
- New Zealand (#43)
- China (#45)
- Paraguay (#54)

Home team	Score	Away team	Location	Venue	Surface
Australia [1]	3–1	Poland	Brisbane	Pat Rafter Arena	Hard
Argentina [2]	3–1	Turkey	Neuquén	Estadio Ruca Che	Hard (i)
Netherlands [3]	4–0	Colombia	's-Hertogenbosch	Maaspoort	Hard (i)
Luxembourg	0–4	Hungary [4]	Luxembourg City	d'Coque	Hard (i)
Brazil [5]	3–1	Switzerland	Rio de Janeiro	Farmasi Arena	Hard (i)
Finland [6]	1–3	Monaco	Espoo	Espoo Metro Areena	Hard (i)
Denmark [7]	3–2	Bulgaria	Hillerød	Royal Stage	Hard (i)
Serbia [8]	4–0	Lithuania	Niš	Čair Sports Center	Hard (i)
Slovakia [9]	3–2	Greece	Košice	NTC Košice	Clay
New Zealand	1–3	Japan [10]	Auckland	Trusts Arena	Hard (i)
Norway [11]	4–0	China	Trondheim	Trondheim Spektrum	Clay (i)
Chinese Taipei	3–2	Sweden [12]	Taipei	Taipei Tennis Center	Hard (i)
Peru [13]	3–2	Paraguay	Lima	Jockey Club del Perú	Clay

=== Play-offs ===
Date: 6–8 February 2026

Twenty-six teams will play for thirteen spots in the World Group I, in series decided on a home and away basis.

These twenty-six teams are:

- 13 losing teams from 2025 World Group I
- 13 winning teams from 2025 World Group II

The 13 winning teams from the play-offs will qualify for the World Group I and the 13 losing teams will play at the World Group II.

#: Nations Ranking as of 15 September 2025.

Seeded teams

1. Finland (#17)
2. Switzerland (#25)
3. Portugal (#27)
4. Chinese Taipei (#28)
5. Bosnia and Herzegovina (#30)
6. Kazakhstan (#31)
7. Israel (#32)
8. Turkey (#35)
9. Poland (#36)
10. Colombia (#38)
11. Greece (#39)
12. Romania (#40)
13. Ukraine (#41)

Unseeded teams

- Egypt (#42)
- Luxembourg (#43)
- Monaco (#44)
- Lithuania (#45)
- Morocco (#46)
- Mexico (#47)
- New Zealand (#48)
- Lebanon (=#51)
- Tunisia (=#51)
- Hong Kong (=#53)
- China (#59)
- Slovenia (#64)
- Paraguay (#65)

Home team	Score	Away team	Location	Venue	Surface
Hong Kong	1–3	Finland [1]	Hong Kong	Victoria Park Tennis Stadium	Hard
Switzerland [2]	4–0	Tunisia	Biel/Bienne	Swiss Tennis Arena	Hard (i)
China	3–1	Portugal [3]	Guangzhou	Nansha International Tennis Center	Hard
Chinese Taipei [4]	3–1	Lebanon	Taipei	Taipei Tennis Center	Hard
New Zealand	3–2	Bosnia and Herzegovina [5]	Whangārei	McKay Stadium	Hard
Kazakhstan [6]	1–3	Monaco	Astana	Beeline Arena	Hard (i)
Israel [7]	1–3	Lithuania	Netanya	Netanya Arena	Hard
Slovenia	1–3	Turkey [8]	Velenje	Bela dvorana Velenje	Clay (i)
Egypt	0–4	Poland [9]	Cairo	Gezira Sporting Club	Clay
Morocco	1–3	Colombia [10]	Casablanca	Union Sportive Marocaine Tennis Club	Clay
Greece [11]	3–1	Mexico	Athens	Faliro Sports Pavilion Arena	Hard (i)
Paraguay	3–1	Romania [12]	Asunción	Club Internacional de Tenis	Clay
Luxembourg	3–1	Ukraine [13]	Luxembourg	Coque - Centre National Sportif et Culturel	Hard (i)

== World Group II ==
Date: 16–20 September 2026

Twenty-six teams will participate in the World Group II, in series decided on a home and away basis.

These twenty-six teams are:

- 13 losing teams from the World Group I play-offs, held in February 2026
- 13 winning teams from the World Group II play-offs, held in February 2026

The 13 winning teams from the World Group II will play in the World Group I play-offs and the 13 losing teams will play in the World Group II play-offs in 2027.

#: Nations Ranking as of 9 February 2026.

Seeded teams

1. Portugal (#38)
2. Bosnia and Herzegovina (=#39)
3. Israel (#41)
4. Kazakhstan (#42)
5. Egypt (#44)
6. Romania (#46)
7. Ukraine (#47)
8. Morocco (#48)
9. Mexico (#49)
10. Uruguay (#50)
11. Tunisia (#51)
12. Lebanon (#52)
13. Hong Kong (#53)

Unseeded teams

- Estonia (#55)
- El Salvador (#56)
- Pakistan (#57)
- South Africa (#58)
- Slovenia (#59)
- Thailand (#60)
- Bolivia (#61)
- Cyprus (#62)
- Dominican Republic (#63)
- Syria (#64)
- Indonesia (#65)
- Nigeria (#66)
- Bermuda (#67)

Home team	Score	Away team	Location	Venue	Surface
El Salvador	0–3	Portugal [1]	Santa Tecla	Polideportivo Merliot	Hard
South Africa	0–4	Bosnia and Herzegovina [2]	Centurion	Irene Country Club	Hard
Slovenia	4–0	Israel [3]	Ljubljana	Tennis Academy Breskvar	Clay
Kazakhstan [4]	3–2	Thailand	Astana	Beeline Arena	Hard (i)
Dominican Republic	3–1	Egypt [5]	Santiago de los Caballeros	Centro Español	Clay
Indonesia	0–4	Romania [6]	Jakarta	Stadion Tenis Gelora Bung Karno	Hard
Cyprus	1–3	Ukraine [7]	Nicosia	National Tennis Centre	Hard
Morocco [8]	4–0	Nigeria	Rabat	Union Sportive des Cheminots de Tennis du Maroc	Clay
Bermuda	0–4	Mexico [9]	Hamilton	W.E.R. Joell Tennis Stadium	Hard
Uruguay [10]	4–0	Estonia	Montevideo	Círculo de Tenis de Montevideo	Clay
Tunisia [11]	3–0	Pakistan	Monastir	Skanes Family Resort	Hard
Syria	0–4	Lebanon [12]	Monastir (Tunisia)	Skanes Family Resort	Hard
Bolivia	3–1	Hong Kong [13]	Santa Cruz de la Sierra	Club de Tenis Santa Cruz	Clay

=== Play-offs ===
Date: 6–8 February 2026

Twenty-six teams will play for thirteen spots in the World Group II, in series decided on a home and away basis.

These twenty-six teams are:

- 13 losing teams from 2025 World Group II
- 13 teams from their Group III zone:
  - 3 from Europe
  - 3 from Asia/Oceania,
  - 3 from Americas, and
  - 3 from Africa
  - 1 highest-ranked team from the teams finishing fourth in each of the four 2025 Regional Group III events (Jamaica).

The 13 winning teams from the play-offs will qualify for the World Group II and the 13 losing teams will play at the Group III of the corresponding continental zone.

#: Nations Ranking as of 15 September 2025.

Seeded teams

1. Uzbekistan (#49)
2. Ireland (#50)
3. Uruguay (=#53)
4. Pakistan (#55)
5. Barbados (#56)
6. Latvia (#57)
7. Georgia (#58)
8. South Africa (#60)
9. El Salvador (#61)
10. Estonia (#62)
11. Togo (#63)
12. Thailand (#66)
13. Cyprus (#67)

Unseeded teams

- Dominican Republic (#68)
- Bolivia (#69)
- Indonesia (#70)
- Namibia (#71)
- Syria (#72)
- Benin (#73)
- Nigeria (#74)
- Jamaica (#75)
- Puerto Rico (#76)
- North Macedonia (#77)
- Bermuda (#81)
- Senegal (#83)
- Montenegro (#85)

Home team	Score	Away team	Location	Venue	Surface
Nigeria	3–1	Uzbekistan [1]	Lagos Island	Lagos Lawn Tennis Club	Hard
Ireland [2]	2–3	Syria	Limerick	UL Sport Arena	Hard (i)
Jamaica	1–3	Uruguay [3]	Kingston	Liguanea Club	Hard
Pakistan [4]	5–0	Senegal	Islamabad	Pakistan Sports Complex	Grass
Barbados [5]	2–3	Bolivia	Bridgetown	Raymond Forde National Tennis Center	Hard
Dominican Republic	3–1	Latvia [6]	Santo Domingo Este	Centro Nacional de Tenis	Hard
Georgia [7]	2–3	Bermuda	Larnaca (Cyprus)	Herodotou Tennis Academy	Hard
South Africa [8]	3–2	Montenegro	Pretoria	Irene Country Club	Hard
Benin	1–3	El Salvador [9]	Cotonou	Sofitel Cotonou Marina Hotel & Spa	Hard
Namibia	0–4	Estonia [10]	Windhoek	Central Tennis Club Olympia	Hard
Indonesia	4–0	Togo [11]	Jakarta	Stadion Tenis Gelora Bung Karno	Hard
Thailand [12]	4–0	Puerto Rico	Nonthaburi	Lawn Tennis Association of Thailand	Hard
Cyprus [13]	5–0	North Macedonia	Nicosia	National Tennis Centre	Hard

== Group III ==
The top three nations of each continental zone will be promoted to the 2027 World Group II play-offs and the last two nations will be relegated to the 2027 Group IV.

=== Americas zone ===
Dates: 9–13 June 2026
Location: Costa Rica Country Club, San José, Costa Rica (Hard, indoors)

Participating teams

- Barbados
- Costa Rica
- Guatemala
- Jamaica
- Puerto Rico
- Venezuela

Withdrawn

- Bahamas

Promotions/Relegations

- Guatemala, Puerto Rico and Venezuela qualify for the 2027 Davis Cup World Group II play-offs, while Barbados also qualified as the nation with the highest Nations Ranking from the teams finishing fourth in each of the four 2026 Regional Group III events
- Costa Rica and Jamaica are relegated to 2027 Americas Zone Group IV

=== Asia/Oceania zone ===
Dates: 15–18 July 2026
Location: National Tennis Centre, Kuala Lumpur, Malaysia (Hard)

Participating teams

- Iran
- Jordan
- Malaysia
- Philippines
- Saudi Arabia
- Singapore
- Uzbekistan
- Vietnam

Promotions/Relegations

- Iran, Jordan and Saudi Arabia qualify for the 2027 Davis Cup World Group II play-offs
- Malaysia and Uzbekistan are relegated to 2027 Asia/Oceania Zone Group IV

=== Europe zone ===
Dates: 10–13 June 2026
Location: National Tennis Centre, Chișinău, Moldova (Clay)

Participating teams

- Azerbaijan
- Georgia
- Ireland
- Kosovo
- Latvia
- Moldova
- Montenegro
- North Macedonia

Promotions/Relegations

- Latvia, Moldova and North Macedonia qualify for the 2027 Davis Cup World Group II play-offs
- Azerbaijan and Kosovo are relegated to 2027 Europe Zone Group IV

=== Africa zone ===
Dates: 11–15 August 2026
Location: Ententive Sportive de Bujumbura, Bujumbura, Burundi (Clay)

Participating teams

- Benin
- Burundi
- Ivory Coast
- Namibia
- Senegal
- Togo

Promotions/Relegations

- Burundi, Namibia and Senegal qualify for the 2027 Davis Cup World Group II play-offs
- Ivory Coast and Togo are relegated to 2027 Africa Zone Group IV

== Group IV ==
The top two nations of each continental zone will be promoted to the 2027 Group III and the last two nations from the Asia/Oceania and Africa zone will be relegated to the 2027 Group V.

=== Americas zone ===
Date: 7–12 July 2026
Location: Rakiura Resort, Luque, Paraguay (Clay)

Participating teams

- Antigua and Barbuda
- Aruba
- Cuba
- Honduras
- Suriname
- Trinidad and Tobago
- U.S. Virgin Islands

Withdrawn

- Haiti
- Panama
- Saint Lucia

Inactive teams

- Eastern Caribbean
- Nicaragua

Promotions

- Aruba and Trinidad and Tobago qualify for the 2027 Americas Zone Group III

=== Asia/Oceania zone ===
Dates: 22–25 July 2026
Location: Sri Lanka Tennis Association Courts, Colombo, Sri Lanka (Clay)

Participating teams

- Iraq
- Kuwait
- Kyrgyzstan
- Northern Mariana Islands
- Qatar
- Sri Lanka
- Turkmenistan

Withdrawn

- Cambodia

Promotions/Relegations

- Qatar and Sri Lanka qualify for the 2027 Asia/Oceania Zone Group III
- Iraq and Turkmenistan are relegated to 2027 Asia/Oceania Zone Group V

=== Europe zone ===
Dates: 17–20 June 2026
Location: Tsaghkadzor Sports Centre & Hotel, Tsaghkadzor, Armenia (Clay)

Participating teams

- Albania
- Andorra
- Armenia
- Iceland
- Malta
- San Marino

Withdrawn

- Liechtenstein

Inactive teams

- Belarus (suspended)
- Russia (suspended)

Promotions

- Armenia and Malta qualify for the 2027 Europe Zone Group III

=== Africa zone ===
Dates: 17–20 June 2026
Location: Parklands Sports Club, Nairobi, Kenya (Hard)

Participating teams

- Algeria
- Angola
- Botswana
- DR Congo
- Ghana
- Kenya
- Mozambique
- Zimbabwe

Promotions/Relegations

- Algeria and Ghana qualify for the 2027 Africa Zone Group III
- DR Congo and Mozambique are relegated to 2027 Africa Zone Group V

== Group V ==
The top two nations of each continental zone will be promoted to the 2027 Group IV.

=== Asia/Oceania zone ===
Dates: 11–14 November 2026
Location: NovaWorld International Tennis Complex, Phan Thiết, Vietnam (Hard)

Participating teams

- Bahrain
- Bangladesh
- Bhutan
- Brunei
- Guam
- Laos
- Macau
- Maldives
- Mongolia
- Nepal
- Pacific Oceania
- Tajikistan
- United Arab Emirates
- Yemen

Withdrawn

- Myanmar

Inactive teams

- Oman

Promotions

- Mongolia and Pacific Oceania qualify for the 2027 Asia/Oceania Zone Group IV

=== Africa zone ===
Date: 22–25 July 2026
Location: Pole Tennis Club, Brazzaville, Congo (Clay)

Participating teams

- Cameroon
- Congo
- Ethiopia
- Gabon
- Libya
- Madagascar
- Mauritania
- Rwanda
- Seychelles
- Tanzania
- Uganda
- Zambia

Withdrawn

- Djibouti
- Lesotho
- Mauritius
- Sudan

Inactive teams

- Burkina Faso
- Mali

Promotions

- Cameroon and Madagascar qualify for the 2027 Africa Zone Group IV
