= 2010 Davis Cup =

2010 edition of the Davis Cup

Details
- Duration: 5 March – 5 December 2010
- Edition: 99th

Champion
- Winning nation: Serbia

The 2010 Davis Cup (also known as the 2010 Davis Cup by BNP Paribas for sponsorship purposes) was the 99th edition of the most important annual tournament among national teams in men's tennis worldwide. In the dramatic final, Serbia defeated France 3–2 to win its first Davis Cup title.

The draw for the World Group, Zonal Groups I and Zonal Groups II took place in Geneva on 23 September 2009. The competition started with the first round on 5–7 March.

On 6–8 March 2010 Novak Djokovic played the key role in bringing Serbia to the World Group quarterfinals for the first time in its independent history, winning both singles matches in the home tie against the United States (against Sam Querrey and John Isner). Later, Serbia progressed to the Davis Cup final, following the victories over Croatia (4–1) and Czech Republic (3–2). Serbia came from 1–2 down to defeat France in the final tie 3–2 in Belgrade to win the nation's first Davis Cup championship. In the final, Djokovic scored two singles points for Serbia, defeating Gilles Simon and Gaël Monfils, while the last match was won by Viktor Troicki, who beat Michaël Llodra.

Serbia became the 13th nation in history to win the Cup, which was passed to them from the previous year's winner Spain. France missed the opportunity to win its 10th title and surpass Great Britain in total number of titles won. The Serbian team celebrated the trophy by fulfilling their bet to shave their hair off in case of victory.

Albania made its first appearance in the tournament.

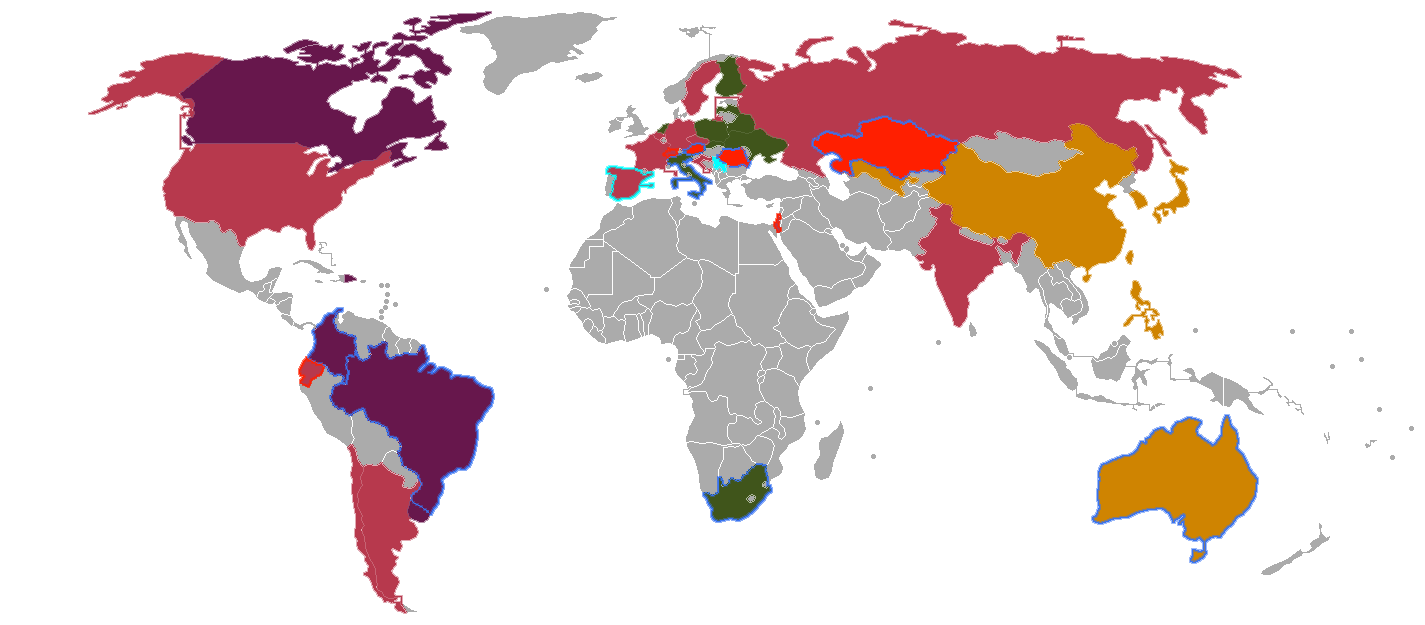
Zones and Groups in the 2010 Davis cup: World Group Americas Zone Group I Asia/Oceania Zone Group I Europe/Africa Zone Group I Countries promoted to World Group play-offs Countries advanced to World Group Countries relegated to Group I 2010 champion Defending champion

== World Group ==
Participating teams
Argentina	Belgium	Chile	Croatia
Czech Republic	Ecuador	France	Germany
India	Israel	Russia	Serbia
Spain	Sweden	Switzerland	United States

=== Draw ===
The draw for the 2010 World Group was held in Geneva on 23 September 2009.

First round 5–7 March
Logroño, Spain (clay)
1	Spain	4
Switzerland	1
Toulon, France (indoor hard)
France	4
8	Germany	1
Moscow, Russia (indoor hard)
4	Russia	3
India	2
Stockholm, Sweden (indoor hard)
Sweden	2
5	Argentina	3
Varaždin, Croatia (indoor hard)
6	Croatia	5
Ecuador	0
Belgrade, Serbia (indoor clay)
Serbia	3
3	United States	2
Coquimbo, Chile (clay) 6–8 March
Chile	4
7	Israel	1
Bree, Belgium (indoor clay)
Belgium	1
2	Czech Republic	4

Quarterfinals; 9–11 July
Clermont-Ferrand, France (indoor hard)
1	Spain	0
France	5
Moscow, Russia (indoor hard)
4	Russia	2
5	Argentina	3
Split, Croatia (indoor hard)
6	Croatia	1
Serbia	4
Coquimbo, Chile (clay)
Chile	1
2	Czech Republic	4

Semifinals; 17–19 September
Lyon, France (indoor hard)
France	5
5	Argentina	0
Belgrade, Serbia (indoor hard)
Serbia	3
2	Czech Republic	2

Final; 3–5 December
Belgrade, Serbia (indoor hard)
France	2
Serbia	3

First round losers played in World Group play-offs.

=== Final ===
Serbia
3
Belgrade Arena, Belgrade, Serbia
3–5 December 2010
Hard (i)

France
2

			1	2	3	4	5
1	(Serbia) (France)	Janko Tipsarević; Gaël Monfils	1; 6	6^{4} 7^{7}	0; 6
2	(Serbia) (France)	Novak Djokovic; Gilles Simon	6; 3	6; 1	7; 5
3	(Serbia) (France)	Viktor Troicki / Nenad Zimonjić; Arnaud Clément / Michaël Llodra	6; 3	7^{7} 6^{3}	4; 6	5; 7	4; 6
4	(Serbia) (France)	Novak Djokovic; Gaël Monfils	6; 2	6; 2	6; 4
5	(Serbia) (France)	Viktor Troicki; Michaël Llodra	6; 2	6; 2	6; 3

== World Group play-offs ==
- Date: 17–19 September

The eight losing teams in the World Group first round ties, and eight winners of the Group I second round ties competed in the World Group play-offs.

Seeded teams

1. United States
2. Israel
3. Germany
4. Sweden
5. India
6. Australia
7. Switzerland
8. Ecuador

Unseeded teams

- Austria
- Belgium
- Brazil
- Colombia
- Italy
- Kazakhstan
- Romania
- South Africa

Home team	Score	Visiting team	Location	Venue	Door	Surface
Colombia	1–3	United States	Bogotá	Plaza de Toros la Santamaria	Outdoor	Clay
Israel	2–3	Austria	Tel Aviv	Nokia Arena	Indoor	Hard
Germany	5–0	South Africa	Stuttgart	TC Weissenhof	Outdoor	Clay
Sweden	3–2	Italy	Lidköping	Sparbanken Lidköping Arena	Indoor	Hard
India	3–2	Brazil	Chennai	SDAT Tennis Stadium	Outdoor	Hard
Australia	2–3	Belgium	North Cairns	Cairns Regional Tennis Centre	Outdoor	Hard
Kazakhstan	5–0	Switzerland	Astana	National Tennis Centre	Indoor	Hard
Romania	5–0	Ecuador	Bucharest	Centrul Naţional de Tenis	Outdoor	Clay

- Belgium, Germany, India, Sweden and United States will remain in the World Group in 2011.
- Austria, Kazakhstan, and Romania are promoted to the World Group in 2011.
- Australia, Brazil, Colombia, Italy and South Africa will remain in Zonal Group I in 2011.
- Ecuador, Israel and Switzerland are relegated to Zonal Group I in 2011.

== Americas Zone ==
=== Group I ===
Seeds:

1. Brazil (promoted to World Group Playoffs)
2. Colombia (promoted to World Group Playoffs)

Remaining nations:

- Canada
- Dominican Republic
- Uruguay

==== Draw ====
Second-round play-offs
Toronto, Canada (hard)
(Dominican Republic) Dominican Rep.	0
Canada	5

First-round play-offs
bye
(Dominican Republic) Dominican Rep.
Canada
bye

First Round
1	Brazil
bye
Santo Domingo, Dominican Rep. (hard)
(Dominican Republic) Dominican Rep.	1
Uruguay	4
bye
Canada
bye
2	Colombia

Second Round
Bauru, Brazil (clay)
1	Brazil	5
Uruguay	0
5–7 March – Bogotá, Colombia (clay)
Canada	1
2	Colombia	4

- Dominican Republic relegated to Group II in 2011.
- Colombia and Braziladvance to World Group play-off.

=== Group II ===
Seeds:

1. Peru
2. Mexico
3. Paraguay
4. Venezuela

Remaining nations:

- Bolivia
- El Salvador
- Guatemala
- Netherlands Antilles

==== Draw ====
Play-offs
Cochabamba, Bolivia
El Salvador	4
Bolivia	1
Guatemala City, Guatemala
Netherlands Antilles	3
Guatemala	2

First Round
Lima, Peru
1	Peru	5
El Salvador	0
La Paz, Bolivia
Bolivia	1
4	Venezuela	4
Lambaré, Paraguay
3	Paraguay	4
Netherlands Antilles	1
Mexico City, Mexico
2	Mexico	5
Guatemala	0

Second Round
Maracaibo, Venezuela
1	Peru	1
4	Venezuela	3
Encarnación, Paraguay
3	Paraguay	1
2	Mexico	4

Third Round
Mexico
4	Venezuela	1
2	Mexico	4

- Bolivia and Guatemala relegated to Group III in 2011.
- Mexico promoted to Group I in 2011.

=== Group III ===
- Venue: San Juan, Puerto Rico (outdoor hard)
- Date: 7-11 July

Rank	Team
1	Puerto Rico
2	Haiti
3	Bahamas
4	Jamaica
5	Costa Rica
6	Aruba
7	Bermuda
8	Cuba (withdrew)

- Puerto Rico and Haiti promoted to Group II in 2011.
- Bermuda relegated to Group IV in 2011.
- Cuba withdrew from the Davis Cup.

=== Group IV ===
- Venue: Panama City, Panama (outdoor clay)
- Date: 29 June - 3 July

Team	Pld	W	L	MF	MA	Pts
Barbados	4	4	0	9	3	4
Honduras	4	3	1	8	4	3
Panama	4	2	2	6	6	2
Trinidad and Tobago	4	1	3	5	7	1
U.S. Virgin Islands	4	0	4	2	10	0

Barbados and Honduras promoted to Group III for 2011.

== Asia/Oceania Zone ==
=== Group I ===
Seeds:
1. Australia
2. South Korea
3. Uzbekistan
4. Japan

Remaining nations:

- China
- Kazakhstan
- Philippines
- Chinese Taipei

==== Draw ====
Second round play-offs
Changwon, South Korea (hard)
Philippines	3
2	South Korea	2

First round play-offs
Kaohsiung, Taiwan (outdoor hard)
Chinese Taipei	4
Philippines	1
Gimcheon, South Korea (indoor hard)
3	Uzbekistan	4
2	South Korea	1

First round
Melbourne, Australia (hard)
1	Australia	5
Chinese Taipei	0
Osaka, Japan (indoor carpet)
4	Japan	5
Philippines	0
Guangdong, China (indoor hard)
China	3
3	Uzbekistan	2
Astana, Kazakhstan (indoor clay)
Kazakhstan	5
2	South Korea	0

Second round
Brisbane, Australia (clay)
1	Australia	5
4	Japan	0
Wuhan, China (hard)
China	1
Kazakhstan	4

- South Korea relegated to Group II in 2011.
- Australia and Kazakhstan advance to World Group play-offs.

=== Group II ===
Seeds:

1. Thailand
2. New Zealand
3. Indonesia
4. Pakistan

Remaining nations:

- Hong Kong
- Malaysia
- Pacific Oceania
- Sri Lanka

==== Draw ====
Play-offs
Malaysia
Pacific Oceania	3
Malaysia	2
Hong Kong	3
Sri Lanka	2

First round
Nonthaburi, Thailand (hard)
1	Thailand	5
Pacific Oceania	0
Kuala Lumpur, Malaysia (indoor hard)
3	Indonesia	5
Malaysia	0
Hong Kong, Hong Kong (hard)
Hong Kong	1
4	Pakistan	3
Colombo, Sri Lanka (clay)
Sri Lanka	2
2	New Zealand	3

Second round
Indonesia
1	Thailand	4
3	Indonesia	1
4	Pakistan	2
2	New Zealand	3

Third round
1	Thailand	2
2	New Zealand	3

- Malaysia and Sri Lanka relegated to Group III in 2011.
- New Zealand promoted to Group I in 2011.

=== Group III ===
- Venue: Enghelab Sport Complex, Tehran, Iran (outdoor clay)
- Date: 28 April–2 May

Rank	Team
1	Syria
2	Iran
3	Lebanon
4	Vietnam
5	Kuwait
6	Oman
7	Bangladesh
8	Saudi Arabia (withdrew)

- Syria and Iran promoted to Group II in 2011.
- Bangladesh relegated to Group IV in 2011.
- Saudi Arabia withdrew from the Davis Cup.

=== Group IV ===
- Venue: Al-Hussein Tennis Club, Amman, Jordan (outdoor hard)
- Date: 19 - 24 April

Rank	Team
1	United Arab Emirates
2	Myanmar
3	Jordan
4	Singapore
5	Bahrain
6	Qatar
7	Turkmenistan
8	Iraq
9	Yemen

- United Arab Emirates and Myanmar promoted to Group III in 2011.

== Europe/Africa Zone ==
=== Group I ===
Seeds:

1. Austria
2. Romania
3. Italy
4. South Africa

Remaining nations:

- Belarus
- Finland
- Netherlands
- Latvia
- Poland
- Slovakia
- Ukraine

==== Draw ====
Second-round play-offs
Minsk, Belarus (hard)
Slovakia	4
Belarus	1
Riga, Latvia (indoor carpet)
Poland	3
Latvia	2

First-round play-offs
bye
Slovakia
3	Netherlands	4
Belarus	1
Poland
bye
Latvia
bye

First Round
1	Austria
bye
Slovakia
bye
3	Netherlands
bye
Castellaneta, Italy (clay)
Italy	5
Belarus	0
Sopot, Poland (indoor hard)
Poland	2
Finland	3
bye
4	South Africa
Dnipropetrovsk, Ukraine (indoor hard)
Ukraine	4
Latvia	1
bye
2	Romania

Second Round
Bad Gleichenberg, Austria (indoor hard)
1	Austria	3
Slovakia	2
Zoetermeer, Netherlands (indoor hard)
3	Netherlands	1
Italy	4
Pretoria, South Africa (hard)
Finland	0
4	South Africa	4
Bucharest, Romania (clay)
Ukraine	1
2	Romania	3

- Belarus and Latvia relegated to Group II in 2011.
- Austria, Italy, South Africa, and Romania advance to 2010 Davis Cup World Group play-offs.

=== Group II ===
Seeds:

1. Great Britain
2. Macedonia
3. Monaco
4. Cyprus
5. Portugal
6. Slovenia
7. Ireland
8. Hungary

Remaining nations:

- Bosnia and Herzegovina
- Bulgaria
- Denmark
- Egypt
- Estonia
- Lithuania
- Norway
- Turkey

==== Draw ====
Play-offs
Eastbourne, Great Britain (grass)
1	Great Britain	5
Turkey	0
Monte Carlo, Monaco (clay)
3	Monaco	5
Norway	0
Cairo, Egypt (clay)
Denmark	5
Egypt	0
Gödöllő, Hungary (clay)
8	Hungary	4
2	Macedonia	1

First Round
Vilnius, Lithuania (indoor hard)
1	Great Britain	2
Lithuania	3
Dublin, Ireland (indoor carpet)
7	Ireland	4
Turkey	1
Sofia, Bulgaria (indoor hard)
3	Monaco	2
Bulgaria	3
Oslo, Norway (indoor hard)
6	Slovenia	5
Norway	0
Maia, Portugal (indoor clay)
Denmark	1
5	Portugal	4
Limassol, Cyprus (indoor hard)
Egypt	2
4	Cyprus	3
Tallinn, Estonia (indoor hard)
Estonia	4
8	Hungary	1
Veles, Macedonia (indoor clay)
Bosnia and Herzegovina	3
2	Macedonia	2

Second Round
Dublin, Ireland (indoor carpet)
Lithuania	3
7	Ireland	2
Otočec, Slovenia (clay)
Bulgaria	0
6	Slovenia	5
Cruz Quebrada, Portugal (clay)
5	Portugal	5
4	Cyprus	0
Tallinn, Estonia (clay)
Estonia	2
Bosnia and Herzegovina	3

Third Round
Vilnius, Lithuania (indoor hard)
Lithuania	2
6	Slovenia	3
Cruz Quebrada, Portugal (clay)
5	Portugal	3
Bosnia and Herzegovina	2

- Turkey, Norway, Egypt, and Macedonia relegated to Group III in 2011.
- Slovenia and Portugal promoted to Group I in 2011.

=== Group III Europe ===
- Venue: Athens Olympic Tennis Centre, Marousi, Greece (outdoor hard)
- Date: 10–15 May

Rank	Team
1	Greece
1	Luxembourg
3	Georgia
3	Moldova
5	Montenegro
6	Malta
7	Armenia
8	Andorra
9	Iceland
10	San Marino
11	Albania

- Greece and Luxembourg were promoted to Europe/Africa Zone Group II in 2011.

=== Group III Africa ===
- Venue: Royal Tennis Club de Marrakech, Marrakesh, Morocco (outdoor clay)
- Date: 5–8 May

Rank	Team
1	Morocco
1	Tunisia
3	Algeria
3	Madagascar
5	Nigeria
5	Zimbabwe
7	Benin
7	Ivory Coast
9	Ghana
9	Kenya
11	Botswana
11	Rwanda
13	Cameroon
14	Congo

- Morocco and Tunisia were promoted to Europe/Africa Zone Group II in 2011.
