= 2027 Davis Cup =

115th edition of the Davis Cup

Details
- Duration: 6 February – [__] November 2027
- Edition: 115th

Champion

The 2027 Davis Cup is the 115th edition of the Davis Cup, a tournament between national teams in men's tennis. It is part of the 2027 ATP Tour calendar.

== Finals ==
Date: November 2027
Venue: TBD, Italy
Surface:

The Finals will feature the host nation (Italy) and the seven winners from the Qualifiers second round.

== Qualifiers ==
=== First round ===
Date: 6–8 February 2027

Twenty-six teams will play for thirteen spots in the Qualifiers second Round, in series decided on a home and away basis.

These twenty-six teams are:

- 6 teams from the 2026 Finals, excluding the Finals host nation Italy and defending champion [____].
- 7 losing teams from the 2026 Davis Cup Qualifiers second round
- 13 winning teams from the 2026 World Group I

The 13 winning teams will play at the Qualifiers second round and the 13 losing teams will play at the World Group I.

#: Nations Ranking as of 21 September 2026.

Seeded teams

1. Belgium (#4)
2. United States (#7)
3. Australia (#9)
4. France (#10)
5. Argentina (#12)
6. Netherlands (#13)
7. Hungary (#15)

Unseeded teams

- Chile (#16)
- Croatia (#17)
- Brazil (#18)
- Japan (#19)
- Denmark (#20)
- India (#21)
- Serbia (#23)
- Slovakia (#24)
- Ecuador (#25)
- Norway (#26)
- Peru (#27)
- Monaco (#28)
- Chinese Taipei (#29)

== World Group I ==
=== Play-offs ===
Date: 6–8 February 2027

Twenty-six teams will play for thirteen spots in the World Group I, in series decided on a home and away basis.

These twenty-six teams are:

- 13 losing teams from 2026 World Group I
- 13 winning teams from 2026 World Group II

The 13 winning teams from the play-offs will qualify for the World Group I and the 13 losing teams will play at the World Group II.

#: Nations Ranking as of 21 September 2026.

Seeded teams

1. Finland (#22)
2. Sweden (#30)
3. Poland (#31)
4. Switzerland (#32)
5. Bulgaria (#33)
6. Portugal (#34)
7. Turkey (#35)
8. Bosnia and Herzegovina (#36)
9. Colombia (#37)
10. Lithuania (#38)
11. Greece (#39)
12. Luxembourg (#40)
13. Kazakhstan (#42)

Unseeded teams

- Romania (#43)
- Ukraine (#44)
- Mexico (#45)
- New Zealand (#46)
- Morocco (#47)
- Lebanon (#48)
- China (#50)
- Uruguay (#51)
- Tunisia (#52)
- Paraguay (#54)
- Slovenia (#58)
- Bolivia (#60)
- Dominican Republic (#62)

Home team	Score	Away team	Location	Venue	Surface
New Zealand	–	Finland [1]			
Sweden [2]	–	Ukraine			
Poland [3]	–	Dominican Republic			
Switzerland [4]	–	Morocco			
Paraguay	–	Bulgaria [5]			
Portugal [6]	–	Romania			
Turkey [7]	–	Tunisia			
Bosnia and Herzegovina [8]	–	Uruguay			
Colombia [9]	–	Mexico			
Bolivia	–	Lithuania [10]			
Slovenia	–	Greece [11]			
Luxembourg [12]	–	China			
Kazakhstan [13]	–	Lebanon			

== World Group II ==
=== Play-offs ===
Date: 6–8 February 2027

Twenty-six teams will play for thirteen spots in the World Group II, in series decided on a home and away basis.

These twenty-six teams are:

- 13 losing teams from 2025 World Group II
- 13 teams from their Group III zone:
  - 3 from Europe
  - 3 from Asia/Oceania,
  - 3 from Americas,
  - 3 from Africa, and
  - 1 highest-ranked team from the teams finishing fourth in each of the four 2026 Regional Group III events (Barbados).

The 13 winning teams from the play-offs will qualify for the World Group II and the 13 losing teams will play at the Group III of the corresponding continental zone.

#: Nations Ranking as of 21 September 2026.

Seeded teams

1. Israel (#41)
2. Egypt (#49)
3. Hong Kong (#53)
4. Estonia (#55)
5. El Salvador (#56)
6. Pakistan (#57)
7. South Africa (#59)
8. Thailand (#61)
9. Cyprus (#63)
10. Latvia (#64)
11. Syria (#65)
12. Barbados (#68)
13. Indonesia (#69)

Unseeded teams

- Nigeria (#70)
- Bermuda (#71)
- Namibia (#73)
- Puerto Rico (#74)
- Venezuela (#75)
- Moldova (#76)
- Senegal (#77)
- North Macedonia (#78)
- Saudi Arabia (#79)
- Jordan (#82)
- Burundi (#84)
- Guatemala (#85)
- Iran (#104)

Home team	Score	Away team	Location	Venue	Surface
Senegal	–	Israel [1]			
Egypt [2]	–	Iran			
Hong Kong [3]	–	Namibia			
Venezuela	–	Estonia [4]			
El Salvador [5]	–	Nigeria			
Saudi Arabia	–	Pakistan [6]			
North Macedonia	–	South Africa [7]			
Guatemala	–	Thailand [8]			
Cyprus [9]	–	Puerto Rico			
Latvia [10]	–	Jordan			
Syria [11]	–	Bermuda			
Moldova	–	Barbados [12]			
Indonesia [13]	–	Burundi			
