= Netherlands Davis Cup team =

National sports team

Netherlands
- Captain: Paul Haarhuis
- Nations Ranking: 13 (21 September 2026)
- Highest ranking: 3 (3 February 2025)
- Colors: Orange & White
- First year: 1920
- Years played: 98
- Ties played (W–L): 188 (87−101)
- Years in World Group: 26
- Runners-up: 1 (2024)
- Most total wins: Hendrik Timmer (43−22)
- Most singles wins: Hendrik Timmer and Robin Haase (32−15)
- Most doubles wins: Paul Haarhuis (16−10)
- Most ties played: Robin Haase (28)
- Most years played: Paul Haarhuis (16)

The Netherlands Davis Cup team represents the Netherlands in the Davis Cup tennis competition and is governed by the Royal Dutch Lawn Tennis Association.

The team's best performance was reaching the final in 2024. It also reached the top four in 1920 and 2001.

== Players ==
=== Current team ===
The following players represented the team in 2026 Davis Cup ties.

- Sander Arends (doubles) [0–1]
- Tallon Griekspoor (singles, doubles) [1–0, 1–0]
- Jesper de Jong (singles) [2–1]
- Guy den Ouden (singles) [1–1]
- David Pel (doubles) [0–1]
- Botic van de Zandschulp (singles, doubles) [1–0, 1–0]

== List of matches ==
=== 1920s ===
Year	Competition	Round	Date	Location	Opponent	Surface	Score	Result
1920	World Group, Qualifying round	First round	11–13 Jun	Arnhem (NED)	South Africa	Clay	3–2	Win
1920	World Group, Qualifying round	Semifinal	16–19 Jul	—	Canada	—	w/o	(Win)
1920	World Group, Qualifying round	Final	1–3 Sep	—	United States	—	w/o	(Loss)
1923	Europe Zone	Quarterfinal	1–3 Jun	Noordwijk (NED)	Italy	Clay	5–0	Win
1923	Europe Zone	Semifinal	9–11 Jul	Eastbourne (GBR)	Spain	Grass	0–5	Loss
1924	Europe Zone	Second round	29–31 May	Arnhem (NED)	India	Clay	1–4	Loss
1925	Europe Zone	First round	15–18 May	Noordwijk (NED)	Czechoslovakia	Clay	3–2	Win
1925	Europe Zone	Quarterfinal	12–14 Jun	Noordwijk (NED)	Sweden	Clay	5–0	Win
1925	Europe Zone	Semifinal	10–12 Jul	Noordwijk (NED)	India	Clay	4–1	Win
1925	Europe Zone	Final	18–20 Jul	Noordwijk (NED)	France	Clay	0–4	Loss
1926	Europe Zone	First round	7–9 May	Noordwijk (NED)	Belgium	Clay	3–2	Win
1926	Europe Zone	Second round	16–18 May	Rome (ITA)	Italy	Clay	2–3	Loss
1927	Europe Zone	First round	3–5 May	Copenhagen (DEN)	Denmark	(Unknown)	1–4	Loss
1928	Europe Zone	First round	10–12 May	Dublin (IRE)	Ireland	Grass	5–0	Win
1928	Europe Zone	Second round	18–20 May	Noordwijk (NED)	Hungary	Clay	3–2	Win
1928	Europe Zone	Quarterfinal	7–9 Jun	The Hague (NED)	Austria	Clay	3–0	Win
1928	Europe Zone	Semifinal	22–24 Jun	Prague (TCH)	Czechoslovakia	(Unknown)	2–3	Loss
1929	Europe Zone	First round	1–3 May	—	Portugal	—	w/o	(Win)
1929	Europe Zone	Second round	17–19 May	The Hague (NED)	Egypt	Clay	4–1	Win
1929	Europe Zone	Quarterfinal	7–9 Jun	Budapest (HUN)	Hungary	(Unknown)	2–3	Loss

=== 1930s ===
Year	Competition	Round	Date	Location	Opponent	Surface	Score	Result
1930	Europe Zone	Second round	16–18 May	Amsterdam (NED)	Finland	Clay	4–1	Win
1930	Europe Zone	Quarterfinal	30 May – 1 Jun	Scheveningen (NED)	Czechoslovakia	Clay	2–3	Loss
1931	Europe Zone	Second round	15–17 May	Turin (ITA)	Italy	Clay	0–3	Loss
1932	Europe Zone	Second round	15–17 May	Warsaw (POL)	Poland	(Unknown)	1–4	Loss
1933	Europe Zone	First round	5–7 May	The Hague (NED)	Poland	Clay	3–2	Win
1933	Europe Zone	Second round	19–21 May	Berlin (GER)	Germany	(Unknown)	1–4	Loss
1934	Europe Zone	Second round	11–13 Aug	Noordwijk (NED)	Romania	Clay	4–1	Win
1934	Europe Zone	Qualifying round	18–20 Aug	Scheveningen (NED)	Italy	Clay	2–3	Loss
1935	Europe Zone	Second round	3–5 Aug 1934	Amsterdam (NED)	Monaco	Clay	4–1	Win
1935	Europe Zone	Qualifying round	24–26 Aug 1934	Stockholm (SWE)	Sweden	Clay	3–2	Win
1935	World Group	First round	10–12 May	Scheveningen (NED)	Japan	Clay	0–5	Loss
1936	Europe Zone	First round	1–3 May	Monte Carlo (MON)	Monaco	(Unknown)	3–2	Win
1936	Europe Zone	Second round	9–11 May	Scheveningen (NED)	France	Clay	1–4	Loss
1937	Europe Zone	First round	30 Apr–2 May	Amsterdam (NED)	South Africa	Clay	0–5	Loss
1938	Europe Zone	First round	5–7 May	Scheveningen (NED)	France	Clay	2–3	Loss
1939	Europe Zone	First round	5–7 May	Warsaw (POL)	Poland	(Unknown)	1–4	Loss

=== 1940s ===
Year	Competition	Round	Date	Location	Opponent	Surface	Score	Result
1946	Europe Zone	First round	10–12 May	Stockholm (SWE)	Sweden	Clay	0–5	Loss
1947	Europe Zone	Second round	15–17 May	Amsterdam (NED)	South Africa	Clay	1–4	Loss
1948	Europe Zone	Second round	6–8 May	Scheveningen (NED)	Portugal	Clay	5–0	Win
1948	Europe Zone	Quarterfinal	10–12 June	Birmingham (GBR)	Great Britain	Grass	1–4	Loss
1949	Europe Zone	First round	30 April–2 May	Scheveningen (NED)	South Africa	Clay	0–5	Loss

=== 1950s ===
Year	Competition	Round	Date	Location	Opponent	Surface	Score	Result
1950	Europe Zone	First round	5–7 May	Scheveningen (NED)	Sweden	Clay	1–4	Loss
1951	Europe Zone	First round	3–5 May	Scheveningen (NED)	Monaco	Clay	4–1	Win
1951	Europe Zone	Second round	11–13 May	Scheveningen (NED)	Ireland	Clay	3–2	Win
1951	Europe Zone	Quarterfinal	17–19 July	Noordwijk (NED)	Philippines	Clay	1–4	Loss
1952	Europe Zone	Second round	16–18 May	Paris (FRA)	France	Clay	1–4	Loss
1953	Europe Zone	First round	1–3 May	Scheveningen (NED)	Ceylon	Clay	5–0	Win
1953	Europe Zone	Second round	14–16 May	Scheveningen (NED)	Italy	Clay	0–5	Loss
1954	Europe Zone	First round	30 April–2 May	Scheveningen (NED)	Spain	Clay	1–4	Loss
1955	Europe Zone	First round	29 Apr–1 May	Basel (SUI)	Switzerland	(Unknown)	2–3	Loss
1956	Europe Zone	First round	27–29 Apr	Ankara (TUR)	Turkey	(Unknown)	5–0	Win
1956	Europe Zone	Second round	11–13 May	Scheveningen (NED)	Chile	Clay	0–5	Loss
1957	Europe Zone	First round	26–28 Apr	Scheveningen (NED)	Norway	Clay	4–1	Win
1957	Europe Zone	Second round	18–20 May	Scheveningen (NED)	Italy	Clay	0–5	Loss
1958	Europe Zone	First round	25–27 Apr	Munich (FRG)	West Germany	(Unknown)	0–4	Loss
1959	Europe Zone	First round	1–3 May	Brussels (BEL)	Belgium	(Unknown)	1–4	Loss

=== 1960s ===
Year	Competition	Round	Date	Location	Opponent	Surface	Score	Result
1960	Europe Zone	First round	29 Apr–1 May	Oslo (NOR)	Norway	Clay	3–2	Win
1960	Europe Zone	Second round	13–15 May	Scheveningen (NED)	Great Britain	Clay	0–5	Loss
1961	Europe Zone	First round	5–7 May	Lucerne (SUI)	Switzerland	(Unknown)	3–2	Win
1961	Europe Zone	Second round	2–4 Jun	Scheveningen (NED)	West Germany	Clay	0–5	Loss
1962	Europe Zone	First round	5–7 May	Scheveningen (NED)	Soviet Union	Clay	0–5	Loss
1963	Europe Zone	First round	3–5 May	Scheveningen (NED)	Rhodesia	Clay	1–4	Loss
1964	Europe Zone	First round	1–3 May	The Hague (NED)	Hungary	Clay	3–2	Win
1964	Europe Zone	Second round	15–17 May	Paris (FRA)	France	Clay	0–5	Loss
1965	Europe Zone	First round	30 Apr–2 May	Scheveningen (NED)	South Africa	Clay	0–4	Loss
1966	Europe (Zone B)	First round	29 Apr–1 May	Scheveningen (NED)	Ireland	Clay	5–0	Win
1966	Europe (Zone B)	Quarterfinal	13–15 May	Scheveningen (NED)	South Africa	Clay	1–4	Loss
1967	Europe (Zone B)	First round	4–6 May	Scheveningen (NED)	South Africa	Clay	2–3	Loss
1968	Europe (Zone A)	First round	3–6 May	Valencia (ESP)	Spain	Clay	2–3	Loss
1969	Europe (Zone B)	First round	9–11 May	Scheveningen (NED)	Canada	Clay	2–3	Loss

=== 1970s ===
Year	Competition	Round	Date	Location	Opponent	Surface	Score	Result
1970	Europe (Zone A)	First round	8–10 May	Athens (GRE)	Greece	(Unknown)	1–4	Loss
1971	Europe (Zone B)	First round	30 Apr–2 May	Bucharest (ROU)	Romania	Clay	0–5	Loss
1972	Europe (Zone A)	First round	5–7 May	Scheveningen (NED)	Norway	Clay	5–0	Win
1972	Europe (Zone A)	Quarterfinal	20–22 May	San Benedetto del Tronto (ITA)	Italy	Clay	1–4	Loss
1973	Europe (Zone A)	First round	3–5 May	Tel Aviv (ISR)	Israel	Hard	4–1	Win
1973	Europe (Zone A)	Quarterfinal	18–20 May	Scheveningen (NED)	Romania	Clay	2–3	Loss
1974	Europe (Zone A)	Qualifying round	10–12 May	Scheveningen (NED)	Finland	Clay	4–1	Win
1974	Europe (Zone A)	Quarterfinal	24–26 May	Båstad (SWE)	Sweden	Clay	1–4	Loss
1975	Europe (Zone B)	Qualifying round	2–4 May	Budapest (HUN)	Hungary	(Unknown)	0–5	Loss
1976	Europe (Zone A)	First round	26–28 Sep 1975	Brussels (BEL)	Belgium	(Unknown)	1–4	Loss
1977	Europe (Zone B)	First round	24–26 Sep 1976	Scheveningen (NED)	Israel	Clay	5–0	Win
1977	Europe (Zone B)	Qualifying round	22–24 Apr	Scheveningen (NED)	Yugoslavia	Clay	0–5	Loss
1978	Europe (Zone A)	First round	16–18 Sep 1977	Zeist (NED)	Greece	Clay	4–1	Win
1978	Europe (Zone A)	Qualifying round	17–19 Mar	Prague (TCH)	Czechoslovakia	Clay (i)	1–3	Loss
1979	Europe (Zone B)	First round	15–17 Sep 1978	Amersfoort (NED)	Norway	Clay	4–1	Win
1979	Europe (Zone B)	Qualifying round	16–18 Mar	Amsterdam (NED)	France	Carpet (i)	2–3	Loss

=== 1980s ===
Year	Competition	Round	Date	Location	Opponent	Surface	Score	Result
1980	Europe (Zone A)	First round	14–16 Sep 1979	Hilversum (NED)	Denmark	Clay	3–2	Win
1980	Europe (Zone A)	Qualifying round	8–10 Feb	Seville (ESP)	Spain	(Unknown)	1–4	Loss
1981	Europe (Zone B)	Quarterfinal	12–14 Jun	Eindhoven (NED)	Ireland	Clay	4–1	Win
1981	Europe (Zone B)	Semifinal	9–11 Jul	Helsinki (FIN)	Finland	Clay	5–0	Win
1981	Europe (Zone B)	Final	25–27 Sep	Jūrmala (URS)	Soviet Union	Clay	0–5	Loss
1982	Europe (Zone B)	Quarterfinal	11–13 Jun	Hørsholm (DEN)	Denmark	Clay	0–3	Loss
1983	Europe (Zone A)	First round	6–8 May	Estoril (POR)	Portugal	Clay	4–1	Win
1983	Europe (Zone A)	Quarterfinal	10–12 Jun	Cairo (EGY)	Egypt	Clay	4–1	Win
1983	Europe (Zone A)	Semifinal	8–10 Jul	Lugano (SUI)	Switzerland	Clay	1–3	Loss
1984	Europe (Zone B)	Quarterfinal	15–17 Jun	Amsterdam (NED)	Spain	Carpet (i)	2–3	Loss
1985	Europe (Zone B)	First round	10–12 May	Hilversum (NED)	Finland	Clay	4–1	Win
1985	Europe (Zone B)	Quarterfinal	14–16 Jun	Ramat HaSharon (ISR)	Israel	Hard	1–4	Loss
1986	Europe (Zone B)	First round	9–11 May	—	Saudi Arabia	—	w/o	(Win)
1986	Europe (Zone B)	Quarterfinal	13–15 Jun	Benin City (NGA)	Nigeria	Clay	3–2	Win
1986	Europe (Zone B)	Semifinal	18–20 Jul	Scheveningen (NED)	Israel	Clay	1–3	Loss
1987	Europe (Zone A)	Quarterfinal	12–14 Jun	Dublin (IRE)	Ireland	Hard (i)	4–1	Win
1987	Europe (Zone A)	Semifinal	24–26 Jul	Valkenswaard (NED)	Soviet Union	Carpet (i)	1–4	Loss
1988	Europe/Africa Zone (Group I)	Second round	10–12 Jun	Warmond (NED)	Senegal	Clay	3–2	Win
1988	Europe/Africa Zone (Group I)	Third round	22–24 Jul	Jūrmala (URS)	Soviet Union	Clay	0–5	Loss
1989	Europe/Africa Zone (Group I)	Second round	5–7 May	Best (NED)	Portugal	Carpet (i)	4–1	Win
1989	World Group	Qualifying round	21–23 Jul	Best (NED)	Indonesia	Carpet (i)	5–0	Win

=== 1990s ===
Year	Competition	Round	Date	Location	Opponent	Surface	Score	Result
1990	World Group	First round	2–4 Feb	Bremen (FRG)	West Germany	Carpet (i)	2–3	Loss
1990	World Group	Qualifying round	21–23 Sep	Toronto (CAN)	Canada	Hard	2–3	Loss
1991	Europe/Africa Zone (Group I)	Second round	3–5 May	Lisbon (POR)	Portugal	Clay	4–1	Win
1991	World Group	Qualifying round	20–22 Sep	Mexico City (MEX)	Mexico	Clay	5–0	Win
1992	World Group	First round	31 Jan – 2 Feb	The Hague (NED)	Switzerland	Carpet (i)	1–4	Loss
1992	World Group	Qualifying round	25–27 Sep	The Hague (NED)	Uruguay	Carpet (i)	4–1	Win
1993	World Group	First round	26–28 Mar	Barcelona (ESP)	Spain	Clay	3–2	Win
1993	World Group	Quarterfinal	16–18 Jul	The Hague (NED)	Sweden	Clay	1–4	Loss
1994	World Group	First round	25–27 Mar	Eindhoven (NED)	Belgium	Carpet (i)	5–0	Win
1994	World Group	Quarterfinal	15–17 Jul	Rotterdam (NED)	United States	Hard	2–3	Loss
1995	World Group	First round	3–5 Feb	Geneva (SUI)	Switzerland	Clay (i)	4–1	Win
1995	World Group	Quarterfinal	31 Mar – 2 Apr	Utrecht (NED)	Germany	Hard (i)	1–4	Loss
1996	World Group	First round	9–11 Feb	Jaipur (IND)	India	Grass	2–3	Loss
1996	World Group	Qualifying round	20–22 Sep	Haarlem (NED)	New Zealand	Hard	4–1	Win
1997	World Group	First round	7–9 Feb	Bucharest (ROU)	Romania	Hard (i)	3–2	Win
1997	World Group	Quarterfinal	4–6 Apr	Newport Beach (USA)	United States	Hard	1–4	Loss
1998	World Group	First round	3–5 Apr	Brussels (BEL)	Belgium	Clay	2–3	Loss
1998	World Group	Qualifying round	25–27 Sep	Eindhoven (NED)	Ecuador	Carpet (i)	5–0	Win
1999	World Group	First round	2–4 Apr	Nimes (FRA)	France	Clay (i)	1–4	Loss
1999	World Group	Qualifying round	24–26 Sep	Guayaquil (ECU)	Ecuador	Clay	3–2	Win

=== 2000s ===
Year	Competition	Round	Date	Location	Opponent	Surface	Score	Result
2000	World Group	First round	4–6 Feb	Leipzig (GER)	Germany	Carpet (i)	1–4	Loss
2000	World Group	Qualifying round	14–16 Jul	Tashkent (UZB)	Uzbekistan	Clay	4–1	Win
2001	World Group	First round	9–11 Feb	Eindhoven (NED)	Spain	Carpet (i)	4–1	Win
2001	World Group	Quarterfinal	6–8 Apr	Den Bosch (NED)	Germany	Carpet (i)	4–1	Win
2001	World Group	Semifinal	21–23 Sep	Rotterdam (NED)	France	Carpet (i)	2–3	Loss
2002	World Group	First round	8–10 Feb	Metz (FRA)	France	Clay	2–3	Loss
2002	World Group	Qualifying round	20–22 Sep	Turku (FIN)	Finland	Carpet (i)	4–1	Win
2003	World Group	First round	7–9 Feb	Arnhem (NED)	Switzerland	Carpet (i)	2–3	Loss
2003	World Group	Playoffs	19–21 Sep	Zwolle (NED)	India	Hard	5–0	Win
2004	World Group	First round	6–8 Feb	Maastricht (NED)	Canada	Clay	4–1	Win
2004	World Group	Quarterfinal	9–11 Apr	Palma de Majorca (ESP)	Spain	Clay	1–4	Loss
2005	World Group	First round	4–6 Mar	Fribourg (SUI)	Switzerland	Hard	3–2	Win
2005	World Group	Quarterfinal	15–17 Jul	Bratislava (SVK)	Slovakia	Hard	1–4	Loss
2006	World Group	First round	10–12 Feb	Amsterdam (NED)	Russia	Carpet (i)	0–5	Loss
2006	World Group	Playoffs	22–24 Sep	Leiden (NED)	Czech Republic	Carpet (i)	1–4	Loss
2007	Europe/Africa Zone (Group I)	Second round	6–8 Apr	Birmingham (GBR)	Great Britain	Hard	1–4	Loss
2007	Europe/Africa Zone (Group I)	Second round playoffs	21–23 Sep	Rotterdam (NED)	Portugal	Hard	5–0	Win
2008	Europe/Africa Zone (Group I)	Second round	11–13 Apr	Skopje (MKD)	Macedonia	Clay	4–1	Win
2008	World Group	Playoffs	19–21 Sep	Apeldoorn (NED)	South Korea	Clay	3–2	Win
2009	World Group	First round	6–8 Mar	Buenos Aires (ARG)	Argentina	Clay	0–5	Loss
2009	World Group	Playoffs	18–20 Sep	Maastricht (NED)	France	Clay	1–4	Loss

=== 2010s ===
Year	Competition	Round	Date	Location	Opponent	Surface	Score	Result
2010	Europe/Africa Zone (Group I)	Second round	7–9 May	Zoetermeer (NED)	Italy	Hard	1–4	Loss
2010	Europe/Africa Zone (Group I)	First round playoffs	9–11 Jul	Minsk (BLR)	Belarus	Hard	4–1	Win
2011	Europe/Africa Zone (Group I)	First round	4–6 Mar	Kharkiv (UKR)	Ukraine	Hard	3–2	Win
2011	Europe/Africa Zone (Group I)	Second round	8–10 Jul	Potchefstroom (RSA)	South Africa	Hard	1–3	Loss
2012	Europe/Africa Zone (Group I)	First round	10–12 Feb	Den Bosch (NED)	Finland	Hard	5–0	Win
2012	Europe/Africa Zone (Group I)	Second round	6–8 Apr	Amsterdam (NED)	Romania	Hard	5–0	Win
2012	World Group	Playoffs	14–16 Sep	Amsterdam (NED)	Switzerland	Clay	2–3	Loss
2013	Europe/Africa Zone (Group I)	Second round	5–7 Apr	Brasov (ROU)	Romania	Hard	5–0	Win
2013	World Group	Playoffs	13–15 Sep	Groningen (NED)	Austria	Clay	5–0	Win
2014	World Group	First round	31 Jan – 2 Feb	Ostrava (CZE)	Czech Republic	Hard	2–3	Loss
2014	World Group	Playoffs	12–14 Sep	Amsterdam (NED)	Croatia	Clay	2–3	Loss
2015	Europe/Africa Zone (Group I)	Second round	17–19 July	Brasov (AUT)	Austria	Clay	3–2	Win
2015	World Group	Playoffs	18–20 Sep	Geneva (SUI)	Switzerland	Hard (i)	1–4	Loss
2016	Europe/Africa Zone (Group I)	Second round	15–17 Jul	Moscow (RUS)	Russia	Hard	1–4	Loss
2016	Europe/Africa Zone (Group I)	First round playoffs	16–18 Sep	Båstad (SWE)	Sweden	Clay	5–0	Win
2017	Europe/Africa Zone (Group I)	Second round	7–9 Apr	Zenica (BIH)	Bosnia and Herzegovina	Hard (i)	3–1	Win
2017	World Group	Playoffs	15–17 Sep	The Hague (NED)	Czech Republic	Clay (i)	3–2	Win
2018	World Group	First round	2–4 Feb	Albertville (FRA)	France	Hard (i)	1–3	Loss
2018	World Group	Playoffs	14–16 Sep	Toronto (CAN)	Canada	Hard (i)	1–3	Loss
2019	World Group	Qualifying round	1–2 Feb	Ostrava (CZE)	Czech Republic	Hard (i)	3–1	Win
2019	Finals	Group E	19 Nov	Madrid (ESP)	Kazakhstan	Hard (i)	1–2	Loss
2019	Finals	Group E	20 Nov	Madrid (ESP)	Great Britain	Hard (i)	1–2	Loss

=== 2020s ===
Year	Competition	Round	Date	Location	Opponent	Surface	Score	Result
2020–21	World Group	Qualifying round	6–7 Mar 2020	Nur-Sultan (KAZ)	Kazakhstan	Hard (i)	1–3	Loss
2020–21	World Group	Group I	18–19 Sep 2021	Montevideo (URU)	Uruguay	Clay	4–0	Win
2022	World Group	Qualifying round	4–5 Mar	The Hague (NED)	Canada	Clay	4–0	Win
2022	Finals	Group D	13 Sep	Glasgow (SCO)	Kazakhstan	Hard (i)	2–1	Win
2022	Finals	Group D	16 Sep	Glasgow (SCO)	Great Britain	Hard (i)	2–1	Win
2022	Finals	Group D	18 Sep	Glasgow (SCO)	United States	Hard (i)	2–1	Win
2022	Finals	Quarterfinal	22 Nov	Málaga (ESP)	Australia	Hard (i)	0–2	Loss
2023	World Group	Qualifying round	4–5 Feb	Groningen (NED)	Slovakia	Hard (i)	4–0	Win
2023	Finals	Group D	12 Sep	Split (CRO)	Finland	Hard (i)	2–1	Win
2023	Finals	Group D	14 Sep	Split (CRO)	United States	Hard (i)	2–1	Win
2023	Finals	Group D	17 Sep	Split (CRO)	Croatia	Hard (i)	1–2	Loss
2023	Finals	Quarterfinal	22 Nov	Málaga (ESP)	Italy	Hard (i)	1–2	Loss
2024	World Group	Qualifying round	2–3 Feb	Groningen (NED)	Switzerland	Hard (i)	3–2	Win
2024	Finals	Group A	10 Sep	Bologna (ITA)	Belgium	Hard (i)	1–2	Loss
2024	Finals	Group A	12 Sep	Bologna (ITA)	Brazil	Hard (i)	2–1	Win
2024	Finals	Group A	15 Sep	Bologna (ITA)	Italy	Hard (i)	1–2	Loss
2024	Finals	Quarterfinal	19 Nov	Málaga (ESP)	Spain	Hard (i)	2–1	Win
2024	Finals	Semifinal	22 Nov	Málaga (ESP)	Germany	Hard (i)	2–0	Win
2024	Finals	Final	24 Nov	Málaga (ESP)	Italy	Hard (i)	0–2	Runner-up
2025	World Group	Second qualifying round	12–13 Sep	Groningen (NED)	Argentina	Hard (i)	1–3	Loss
2026	World Group	First qualifying round	7–8 Feb	Bengaluru (IND)	India	Hard (i)	2–3	Loss
2026	World Group	Group I	18-19 Sep	Den Bosch (NED)	Colombia	Hard (i)	4–0	Win
2027	World Group	First qualifying round	TBD	TBD	TBD	TBD	TBD	TBD

== Statistics ==
=== Home and away record ===
As of 20 September 2026

- Performance at home: 49–43 (53%)
- Performance away: 31–51 (38%)
- Performance at neutral venues: 7–7 (50%)
- Total: 87–101 (46%) against 57 different opponents

=== Head-to-head record ===
As of 20 September 2026 (after 188th match, a 4–0 win over Colombia)

Nation	Ties	W–L	Win %	Court Surface					Setting		Venue			Played	
Nation	Ties	W–L	Win %	Clay	Hard	Grass	Carpet	Unknown	Indoor	Outdoor	Home	Away	Neutral	First	Last
Argentina	2	0–2	0%	0–1	0–1	—	—	—	0–1	0–1	0–1	0–1	—	2009	2025
Australia	1	0–1	0%	—	0–1	—	—	—	0–1	—	—	—	0–1	2022	(2022)
Austria	3	3–0	100%	3–0	—	—	—	—	—	3–0	2–0	1–0	—	1928	2015
Belarus	1	1–0	100%	—	1–0	—	—	—	—	1–0	—	1–0	—	2010	(2010)
Belgium	6	2–4	33%	1–1	0–1	—	1–0	0–2	1–1	1–1	2–0	0–3	0–1	1926	2024
Bosnia and Herzegovina	1	1–0	100%	—	1–0	—	—	—	1–0	—	—	1–0	—	2017	(2017)
Brazil	1	1–0	100%	—	1–0	—	—	—	1–0	—	—	—	1–0	2024	(2024)
Canada ^{1}	5	2–3	40%	2–1	0–2	—	—	—	0–1	2–2	2–1	0–2	—	1920	2022
Chile	1	0–1	0%	0–1	—	—	—	—	—	0–1	0–1	—	—	1956	(1956)
Colombia	1	1–0	100%	—	1–0	—	—	—	1–0	—	1–0	—	—	2026	(2026)
Croatia	2	0–2	0%	0–1	0–1	—	—	—	0–1	0–1	0–1	0–1	—	2014	2023
Czech Republic	4	2–2	50%	1–0	1–1	—	0–1	—	2–1	0–1	1–1	1–1	—	2006	2019
Czechoslovakia ^{2}	4	1–3	25%	1–2	—	—	—	0–1	0–1	1–1	1–1	0–2	—	1925	1978
Denmark	3	1–2	33%	1–1	—	—	—	0–1	—	1–1	1–0	0–2	—	1927	1982
Ecuador	2	2–0	100%	1–0	—	—	1–0	—	1–0	1–0	1–0	1–0	—	1998	1999
Egypt	2	2–0	100%	2–0	—	—	—	—	—	2–0	1–0	1–0	—	1929	1983
Finland	7	7–0	100%	4–0	2–0	—	1–0	—	2–0	5–0	4–0	2–0	1–0	1930	2023
France	11	0–11	0%	0–8	0–1	—	0–2	—	0–4	0–7	0–6	0–5	—	1925	2018
Germany	5	2–3	40%	—	1–1	—	1–1	0–1	2–2	—	1–1	0–2	1–0	1933	2024
Great Britain	5	1–4	20%	0–1	1–2	0–1	—	—	1–1	0–3	0–1	0–2	1–1	1948	2022
Greece	2	1–1	50%	1–0	—	—	—	0–1	—	1–0	1–0	0–1	—	1970	1978
Hungary	4	2–2	50%	2–0	—	—	—	0–2	—	2–0	2–0	0–2	—	1928	1975
India	5	2–3	40%	1–1	1–1	0–1	—	—	0–1	2–2	2–1	0–2	—	1924	2026
Indonesia	1	1–0	100%	—	—	—	1–0	—	1–0	—	1–0	—	—	1989	(1989)
Ireland	5	5–0	100%	3–0	1–0	1–0	—	—	1–0	4–0	3–0	2–0	—	1928	1987
Israel	4	2–2	50%	1–1	1–1	—	—	—	—	2–2	1–1	1–1	—	1973	1985
Italy	11	1–10	9%	1–6	0–4	—	—	—	0–3	1–7	1–4	0–4	0–2	1923	2024
Japan	1	0–1	0%	0–1	—	—	—	—	—	0–1	0–1	—	—	1935	(1935)
Kazakhstan	3	1–2	33%	—	1–2	—	—	—	1–2	—	—	0–1	1–1	2019	2022
Mexico	1	1–0	100%	1–0	—	—	—	—	—	1–0	—	1–0	—	1991	(1991)
Monaco	3	3–0	100%	2–0	—	—	—	1–0	—	2–0	2–0	1–0	—	1935	1951
New Zealand	1	1–0	100%	—	1–0	—	—	—	—	1–0	1–0	—	—	1996	(1996)
Nigeria	1	1–0	100%	1–0	—	—	—	—	—	1–0	—	1–0	—	1986	(1986)
North Macedonia	1	1–0	100%	1–0	—	—	—	—	—	1–0	—	1–0	—	2008	(2008)
Norway	4	4–0	100%	4–0	—	—	—	—	—	4–0	3–0	1–0	—	1957	1979
Philippines	1	0–1	0%	0–1	—	—	—	—	—	0–1	0–1	—	—	1951	(1951)
Poland	3	1–2	33%	1–0	—	—	—	0–2	—	1–0	1–0	0–2	—	1932	1939
Portugal ^{1}	5	5–0	100%	3–0	1–0	—	1–0	—	1–0	4–0	3–0	2–0	—	1948	2007
Rhodesia ^{2}	1	0–1	0%	0–1	—	—	—	—	—	0–1	0–1	—	—	1963	(1963)
Romania	6	4–2	67%	1–2	3–0	—	—	—	1–0	3–2	2–1	2–1	—	1934	2013
Russia	2	0–2	0%	—	0–1	—	0–1	—	0–1	0–1	0–1	0–1	—	2006	2016
Senegal	1	1–0	100%	1–0	—	—	—	—	—	1–0	1–0	—	—	1988	(1988)
Slovakia	2	1–1	50%	—	1–1	—	—	—	1–0	0–1	1–0	0–1	—	2005	2023
South Africa	8	1–7	13%	1–6	0–1	—	—	—	—	1–7	1–6	0–1	—	1937	2011
South Korea	1	1–0	100%	1–0	—	—	—	—	—	1–0	1–0	—	—	2008	(2008)
Soviet Union ^{2}	4	0–4	0%	0–3	—	—	0–1	—	0–1	0–3	0–2	0–2	—	1962	1988
Spain	9	3–6	33%	1–3	1–0	0–1	1–1	0–1	2–1	1–4	1–2	2–3	0–1	1923	2024
Sri Lanka	1	1–0	100%	1–0	—	—	—	—	—	1–0	1–0	—	—	1953	(1953)
Sweden	7	3–4	43%	3–4	—	—	—	—	—	3–4	1–2	2–2	—	1925	2016
Switzerland	10	4–6	40%	1–2	2–1	—	0–2	1–1	2–3	1–2	1–3	3–3	—	1955	2024
Turkey	1	1–0	100%	—	—	—	—	1–0	—	—	—	1–0	—	1956	(1956)
Ukraine	1	1–0	100%	—	1–0	—	—	—	—	1–0	—	1–0	—	2011	(2011)
Uruguay	2	2–0	100%	1–0	—	—	1–0	—	1–0	1–0	1–0	1–0	—	1992	2020–21
United States ^{1}	4	2–2	50%	—	2–2	—	—	—	2–0	0–2	0–1	0–1	2–0	1994	2023
Uzbekistan	1	1–0	100%	1–0	—	—	—	—	—	1–0	—	1–0	—	2000	(2000)
West Germany ^{2}	3	0–3	0%	0–1	—	—	0–1	0–1	0–1	0–1	0–1	0–2	—	1958	1990
Yugoslavia ^{2}	1	0–1	0%	0–1	—	—	—	—	—	0–1	0–1	—	—	1977	(1977)
57	188	87–101	46%	50–50	25–25	1–3	8–10	3–13	25–27	59–61	49–43	31–51	7–7	1920	2026
Nations	Ties	W–L	Win %	Clay	Hard	Grass	Carpet	Unknown	Indoor	Outdoor	Home	Away	Neutral	First	Last

Notes

^{1} Does not include ties where a walkover occurred:
- 1920 win against Canada in the Semifinal
- 1920 loss against United States in the Final
- 1929 win against Portugal in First round (Europe Zone)
^{2} Former nations.

=== Ties by decade ===
Decade	Played	Won	Lost	Win %
1920–1929	17	10	7	58.8%
1930–1939	16	6	10	37.5%
1940–1949	5	1	4	20.0%
1950–1959	15	5	10	33.4%
1960–1969	14	4	10	28.6%
1970–1979	16	6	10	37.5%
1980–1989	20	11	9	55.0%
1990–1999	20	10	10	50.0%
2000–2009	21	10	11	47.6%
2010–2019	22	11	11	50.0%
2020–2026	22	13	9	59.1%
Total	188	87	101	46.3%

Note

Ties where a walkover occurred are not included in the tally:
- 1920-1929 (3 ties)
- 1980-1989 (1 tie)

=== Host cities ===
As of 20 September 2026, 22 cities in the Netherlands have hosted a total of 92 home turf ties.

City	Ties	%
Scheveningen	31	33.7%
Amsterdam	10	10.9%
The Hague	9	9.8%
Noordwijk	9	9.8%
Eindhoven	4	4.3%
Groningen	4	4.3%
Den Bosch	3	3.3%
Rotterdam	3	3.3%
Arnhem	2	2.2%
Best	2	2.2%
Haarlem	2	2.2%
Hilversum	2	2.2%
Maastricht	2	2.2%
Amersfoort	1	1.1%
Apeldoorn	1	1.1%
Leiden	1	1.1%
Utrecht	1	1.1%
Valkenswaard	1	1.1%
Warmond	1	1.1%
Zeist	1	1.1%
Zoetermeer	1	1.1%
Zwolle	1	1.1%

== See also ==
- Davis Cup
- Netherlands Billie Jean King Cup team
- Netherlands at the Hopman Cup
- Royal Dutch Lawn Tennis Association
