= Bulgaria Davis Cup team =

Bulgarian national tennis team

Bulgaria
- Captain: Valentin Dimov
- Nations Ranking: 34 (24 November 2025)
- Colors: Green & White
- First year: 1964
- Years played: 58
- Ties played (W–L): 127 (69–58)
- Years in World Group: 1
- Most total wins: Todor Enev (28–20)
- Most singles wins: Dimitar Kuzmanov (24–9)
- Most doubles wins: Ivo Bratanov (13–0)
- Best doubles team: Ivo Bratanov / Ivaylo Traykov (5–0); Bozhidar Pampoulov / Matei Pampoulov (5–9)
- Most ties played: Todor Enev (33)
- Most years played: Todor Enev (14)

The Bulgaria men's national tennis team represents Bulgaria in Davis Cup tennis competition and is governed by the Bulgarian Tennis Federation.

== History ==
Bulgaria made their Davis Cup debut in 1964. Their best performances came in the mid-1980s when they reached the Europe/Africa Zone Group I semifinals in two consecutive years – 1986 and 1987.

In the 2024 edition of the tournament Bulgaria lost 1–3 to Bosnia and Herzegovina in the World Group I Play-offs. In September's 2024 World Group II tie the team faced El Salvador at home and completed its first comeback from 1–2 down since 1993 to clinch the win and guarantee its place in the World Group I Play-offs in 2025.

In the 2025 edition of the tournament Bulgaria defeated Romania 3–1 in the World Group I Play-offs, guaranteeing its place in the World Group I in September. In September 2025, Bulgaria defeated Finland and moved into the Davis Cup Qualifiers stage for the first time, with the opportunity to enter the World Group in February 2026.

== Results and fixtures ==
The following are lists of match results and scheduled matches for the previous year and any upcoming ties.

Win Loss Fixture

=== 2026 ===
Qualifiers
First round

Bulgaria
0
Kolodruma, Plovdiv, Bulgaria
7–8 February 2026
Clay (indoors)

Belgium
4

			1	2	3
1	(Bulgaria) (Belgium)	Alexander Vasilev; Raphaël Collignon	3; 6	3; 6
2	(Bulgaria) (Belgium)	Iliyan Radulov; Alexander Blockx	7^{7} 6^{3}	4; 6	1; 6
3	(Bulgaria) (Belgium)	Alexander Donski / Petr Nesterov; Sander Gillé / Joran Vliegen	6^{5} 7^{7}	6^{3} 7^{7}
4	(Bulgaria) (Belgium)	Ivan Ivanov; Raphaël Collignon	2; 6	2; 6
5	(Bulgaria) (Belgium)	Alexander Vasilev; Alexander Blockx				not played

== Players ==
=== Current team ===
Player information and rankings as of 2 February 2026

The following players were called up for the Qualifiers first round tie against Belgium in February 2026.

Player	ATP Rank	First year played	Total Win/Loss	Singles Win/Loss	Doubles Win/Loss
Petr Nesterov	540	2022	3–6	1–3	2–3
Iliyan Radulov	663	2024	2–1	2–1	0–0
Alexander Donski	676	2019	6–5	1–0	5–5
Ivan Ivanov	780	2025	0–2	0–2	0–0
Alexander Vasilev	1025	2025	2–1	2–1	0–0

Recent callups

Player	Most recent appearance
Yanaki Milev	2025 World Group I
Adrian Andreev	2025 World Group I play-offs
Dimitar Kuzmanov	2024 World Group I play-offs
Alexandar Lazarov	2024 World Group I play-offs

== Recent performances ==
Here is the list of all match-ups since 1981, when the competition started being held in the current World Group format.

=== 1980s ===
Year	Competition	Date	Location	Opponent	Score	Result
1981	European Zone, 1st Round	08–10 May	Mondorf-les-Bains (LUX)	Luxembourg	5–0	Win
1981	European Zone, Quarterfinal	12–14 June	Helsinki (FIN)	Finland	2–3	Loss
1982	European Zone, 1st Round	07–9 May	Sofia (BUL)	Denmark	1–4	Loss
1983	European Zone, 1st Round	04–6 May	Algiers (ALG)	Algeria	4–1	Win
1983	European Zone, Quarterfinal	10–12 June	Sofia (BUL)	Finland	3–2	Win
1983	European Zone, Semifinal	8–10 July	Sofia (BUL)	Yugoslavia	0–5	Loss
1984	European Zone, 1st Round	BYE				
1984	European Zone, Quarterfinal	15–17 June	Plovdiv (BUL)	Belgium	2–3	Loss
1985	European Zone, 1st Round	10–12 May	Brussels (BEL)	Belgium	1–3	Loss
1986	European Zone, 1st Round	09–11 May	Haskovo (BUL)	Cyprus	5–0	Win
1986	European Zone, Quarterfinal	13–15 June	Haskovo (BUL)	Egypt	4–1	Win
1986	European Zone, Semifinal	18–20 July	Moliets (FRA)	France	0–5	Loss
1987	European Zone, 1st Round	BYE				
1987	European Zone, Quarterfinal	12–14 June	Haskovo (BUL)	Senegal	5–0	Win
1987	European Zone, Semifinal	24–26 July	Haskovo (BUL)	Switzerland	0–5	Loss
1988	Europe Zone Group I, 1st Round	BYE				
1988	Europe Zone Group I, Quarterfinal	06–8 May	Dakar (SEN)	Senegal	1–4	Loss
1988	Europe Zone Group I, Relegation Play-off	10–12 June	Sofia (BUL)	Romania	0–5	Loss
1989	Europe Zone Group II, 1st Round	BYE				
1989	Europe Zone Group II, Quarterfinal	12–14 May	Monte Carlo (MON)	Monaco	1–3	Loss

=== 1990s ===
Year	Competition	Date	Location	Opponent	Score	Result
1990	Europe Zone Group II, 1st Round	30 March–1 April	Nicosia (CYP)	Cyprus	5–0	Win
1990	Europe Zone Group II, Quarterfinal	4–6 May	Sofia (BUL)	Greece	5–0	Win
1990	Europe Zone Group II, Semifinal	15–17 June	Warsaw (POL)	Poland	1–4	Loss
1991	Europe Zone Group II, Quarterfinal	3–5 May	Oslo (NOR)	Norway	0–5	Loss
1992	Euro/African Zone Group II, 1st Round	1–3 May	Sofia (BUL)	Malta	5–0	Win
1992	Euro/African Zone Group II, Quarterfinal	17–19 July	Athens (GRE)	Greece	1–4	Loss
1993	Euro/African Zone Group II, 1st Round	30 April–2 May	Sofia (BUL)	Poland	3–2	Win
1993	Euro/African Zone Group II, Quarterfinal	16–18 July	Sofia (BUL)	South Africa	1–4	Loss
1994	Euro/African Zone Group II, 1st Round	29 April–1 May	Sopot (POL)	Poland	1–4	Loss
1994	Euro/African Zone Group II, Relegation Play-off	15–18 July	Cairo (EGY)	Egypt	2–3	Loss
1995	Euro/African Zone Group III, Round Robin	11 May	San Marino (SMR)	Cameroon	3–0	Win
1995	Euro/African Zone Group III, Round Robin	12 May	San Marino (SMR)	Tunisia	3–0	Win
1995	Euro/African Zone Group III, Round Robin	13 May	San Marino (SMR)	Macedonia	1–2	Loss
1995	Euro/African Zone Group III, Round Robin	14 May	San Marino (SMR)	Georgia	2–0	Win
1996	Euro/African Zone Group III, Round Robin	8 January	Nairobi (KEN)	Monaco	3–0	Win
1996	Euro/African Zone Group III, Round Robin	9 January	Nairobi (KEN)	Botswana	3–0	Win
1996	Euro/African Zone Group III, Round Robin	10 January	Nairobi (KEN)	Kenya	3–0	Win
1996	Euro/African Zone Group III, Round Robin	12 January	Nairobi (KEN)	Greece	0–3	Loss
1996	Euro/African Zone Group III, Round Robin	13 January	Nairobi (KEN)	Congo	3–0	Win
1996	Euro/African Zone Group III, Round Robin	14 January	Nairobi (KEN)	Togo	3–0	Win
1997	Euro/African Zone Group III, Round Robin	21 May	Plovdiv (BUL)	Malta	3–0	Win
1997	Euro/African Zone Group III, Round Robin	22 May	Plovdiv (BUL)	Estonia	3–0	Win
1997	Euro/African Zone Group III, Round Robin	23 May	Plovdiv (BUL)	Kenya	3–0	Win
1997	Euro/African Zone Group III, Semifinal	24 May	Plovdiv (BUL)	Moldova	3–0	Win
1997	Euro/African Zone Group III, Final	25 May	Plovdiv (BUL)	Monaco	3–0	Win
1998	Euro/African Zone Group II, 1st Round	1–3 May	Meknes (MAR)	Morocco	2–3	Loss
1998	Euro/African Zone Group II, Relegation Play-off	17–19 July	Sofia (BUL)	Luxembourg	5–0	Win
1999	Euro/African Zone Group II, 1st Round	30 April–2 May	Plovdiv (BUL)	Togo	5–0	Win
1999	Euro/African Zone Group II, Quarterfinal	16–18 July	Budapest (HUN)	Hungary	1–4	Loss

=== 2000s ===
Year	Competition	Date	Location	Opponent	Score	Result
2000	Euro/African Zone Group II, 1st Round	28–30 April	Sofia (BUL)	Greece	2–3	Loss
2000	Euro/African Zone Group II, Relegation Play-off	21–23 July	Sofia (BUL)	Israel	2–3	Loss
2001	Euro/African Zone Group III, Round Robin	23 May	Rose Hill (MRI)	Namibia	3–0	Win
2001	Euro/African Zone Group III, Round Robin	24 May	Rose Hill (MRI)	Togo	3–0	Win
2001	Euro/African Zone Group III, Round Robin	25 May	Rose Hill (MRI)	Macedonia	3–0	Win
2001	Euro/African Zone Group III, Semifinal	26 May	Rose Hill (MRI)	Bosnia and Herzegovina	3–0	Win
2001	Euro/African Zone Group III, Final	27 May	Rose Hill (MRI)	Egypt	2–1	Win
2002	Euro/African Zone Group II, 1st Round	3–5 May	Odesa (UKR)	Ukraine	3–2	Win
2002	Euro/African Zone Group II, Quarterfinal	12–14 July	Abidjan (CIV)	Ivory Coast	2–3	Loss
2003	Euro/African Zone Group II, 1st Round	4–6 April	Sofia (BUL)	Ukraine	3–2	Win
2003	Euro/African Zone Group II, Quarterfinal	11–14 July	Belgrade (SCG)	Serbia and Montenegro	1–4	Loss
2004	Europe/Africa Zone Group II, 1st Round	9–11 April	Sofia (BUL)	Egypt	5–0	Win
2004	Europe/Africa Zone Group II, Quarterfinal	16–18 July	Teramo (ITA)	Italy	0–5	Loss
2005	Europe/Africa Zone Group II, 1st Round	4–6 March	Sofia (BUL)	Georgia	4–1	Win
2005	Europe/Africa Zone Group II, Quarterfinal	15–17 July	Helsinki (FIN)	Finland	3–2	Win
2005	Europe/Africa Zone Group II, Semifinal	23–25 September	Donetsk (UKR)	Ukraine	1–4	Loss
2006	Europe/Africa Zone Group II, 1st Round	7–9 April	Plovdiv (BUL)	Cyprus	3–2	Win
2006	Europe/Africa Zone Group II, Quarterfinal	21–23 July	Plovdiv (BUL)	Hungary	2–3	Loss
2007	Europe/Africa Zone Group II, 1st Round	6–8 April	Jūrmala (LAT)	Latvia	1–4	Loss
2007	Europe/Africa Zone Group II, Relegation Play-off	20–22 July	Nicosia (CYP)	Cyprus	1–4	Loss
2008	Europe/Africa Zone Group III, Round Robin	8 April	Plovdiv (BUL)	Montenegro	3–0	Win
2008	Europe/Africa Zone Group III, Round Robin	9 April	Plovdiv (BUL)	Ivory Coast	3–0	Win
2008	Europe/Africa Zone Group III, Round Robin	10 April	Plovdiv (BUL)	Madagascar	2–1	Win
2008	Europe/Africa Zone Group III, Round Robin	11 April	Plovdiv (BUL)	Turkey	3–0	Win
2008	Europe/Africa Zone Group III, Round Robin	12 April	Plovdiv (BUL)	Zimbabwe	3–0	Win
2009	Europe/Africa Zone Group II, 1st Round	6–8 March	Győr (HUN)	Hungary	3–2	Win
2009	Europe/Africa Zone Group II, Quarterfinal	10–12 July	Plovdiv (BUL)	Latvia	1–4	Loss

=== 2010s ===
Year	Competition	Date	Location	Opponent	Score	Result
2010	Europe/Africa Zone Group II, 1st Round	5–7 March	Sofia (BUL)	Monaco	3–2	Win
2010	Europe/Africa Zone Group II, Quarterfinal	9–11 July	Otočec (SLO)	Slovenia	0–5	Loss
2011	Europe/Africa Zone Group II, 1st Round	4–6 March	Minsk (BLR)	Belarus	1–4	Loss
2011	Europe/Africa Zone Group II, Relegation Play-off	8–10 July	Sofia (BUL)	Cyprus	2–3	Loss
2012	Europe Zone Group III, Round Robin	2 May	Sofia (BUL)	Albania	3–0	Win
2012	Europe Zone Group III, Round Robin	4 May	Sofia (BUL)	Georgia	3–0	Win
2012	Europe Zone Group III, Final	5 May	Sofia (BUL)	Macedonia	3–0	Win
2013	Europe/Africa Zone Group II, 1st Round	1–3 February	Sofia (BUL)	Finland	2–3	Loss
2013	Europe/Africa Zone Group II, Relegation Play-off	5–7 April	Plovdiv (BUL)	Estonia	3–0	Win
2014	Europe/Africa Zone Group II, 1st Round	31 January–2 February	Helsinki (FIN)	Finland	2–3	Loss
2014	Europe/Africa Zone Group II, Relegation Play-off	4–6 April	Athens (GRE)	Greece	4–1	Win
2015	Europe/Africa Zone Group II, 1st Round	6–8 March	Jūrmala (LAT)	Latvia	4–1	Win
2015	Europe/Africa Zone Group II, Quarterfinal	17–19 July	Luxembourg City (LUX)	Luxembourg	5–0	Win
2015	Europe/Africa Zone Group II, Semifinal	18–20 September	Sofia (BUL)	Hungary	2–3	Loss
2016	Europe/Africa Zone Group II, 1st Round	4–6 March	Ankara (TUR)	Turkey	2–3	Loss
2016	Europe/Africa Zone Group II, Relegation Play-off	15–17 July	Tunis (TUN)	Tunisia	2–3	Loss
2017	Europe Zone Group III, Round Robin	6 April	Sozopol (BUL)	Armenia	3–0	Win
2017	Europe Zone Group III, Round Robin	7 April	Sozopol (BUL)	Greece	3–0	Win
2017	Europe Zone Group III, Final	8 April	Sozopol (BUL)	Ireland	1–2	Loss
2018	Europe Zone Group III, Round Robin	4 April	Plovdiv (BUL)	Albania	3–0	Win
2018	Europe Zone Group III, Round Robin	5 April	Plovdiv (BUL)	Iceland	3–0	Win
2018	Europe Zone Group III, Round Robin	6 April	Plovdiv (BUL)	North Macedonia	3–0	Win
2018	Europe Zone Group III, Final	7 April	Plovdiv (BUL)	Monaco	1–2	Loss
2019	Europe/Africa Zone Group II, 1st Round	13–14 September	Cape Town (RSA)	South Africa	1–4	Loss

=== 2020s ===
Year	Competition	Date	Location	Opponent	Score	Result
2020	World Group II Play-offs	6–7 September	San José (CRC)	Costa Rica	4–1	Win
2021	World Group II	5–6 March	Sofia (BUL)	Mexico	1–3	Loss
2022	World Group II Play-offs	4–5 March	Sofia (BUL)	Paraguay	3–1	Win
2022	World Group II	16–17 September	Sofia (BUL)	South Africa	3–0	Win
2023	World Group I Play-offs	4–5 February	Christchurch (NZL)	New Zealand	3–1	Win
2023	World Group I	16–17 September	Sofia (BUL)	Kazakhstan	1–3	Loss
2024	World Group I Play-offs	3–4 February	Burgas (BUL)	Bosnia and Herzegovina	1–3	Loss
2024	World Group II	14–16 September	Plovdiv (BUL)	El Salvador	3–2	Win
2025	World Group I Play-offs	31 January–1 February	Craiova (ROU)	Romania	3–1	Win
2025	World Group I	13–14 September	Plovdiv (BUL)	Finland	3–2	Win
2026	Qualifying round I	7–8 February	Plovdiv (BUL)	Belgium	0–4	Loss

== Team representatives ==
This is a list of tennis players who have represented the Bulgaria Davis Cup team in an official Davis Cup match.

Player	W-L (Total)	W-L (Singles)	W-L (Doubles)	Ties	Debut	Years played
Adrian Andreev	3–2	2–1	1–1	5	2018	3
Georgi Arabov	3–0	1–0	2–0	3	1995	1
Teodor Bachev	0–2	0–0	0–2	2	1984	2
Ivo Bratanov	18–2	5–2	13–0	17	1996	6
Nikolai Chuparov	0–3	0–2	0–1	1	1964	1
Grigor Dimitrov	20–4	16–1	4–3	14	2008	7
Valentin Dimov	0–3	0–2	0–1	3	2009	3
Gabriel Donev	0–2	0–1	0–1	2	2019	2
Alexander Donski	6–5	1–0	5–5	11	2019	7
Todor Enev	28–20	17–14	11–6	33	1999	14
Ljuben Genov	13–14	12–14	1–0	15	1968	11
Tihomir Grozdanov	13–3	4–2	9–1	13	2008	6
Dinko Halachev	0–1	0–1	0–0	1	2014	1
Victor Ivanchev	2–1	0–1	2–0	31	2001	1
Ivan Ivanov	0–2	0–2	0–0	2	2025	2
Simeon Ivanov	5–0	1–0	4–0	4	2008	1
Mihail Kanev	1–0	1–0	0–0	1	1995	1
Yordan Kanev	3–7	2–5	1–2	8	2004	4
Ivan Keskinov	15–8	13–7	2–1	14	1989	6
Ilia Kushev	7–9	3–5	4–4	11	2003	6
Dimitar Kutrovsky	8–6	6–4	2–2	6	2011	3
Dimitar Kuzmanov	26–13	24–9	2–4	26	2011	12
Alexandar Lazarov	11–8	6–3	5–5	12	2016	7
Krassimir Lazarov	15–24	10–14	5–10	17	1983	10
Marian Lazarov	4–3	0–1	4–2	6	1983	3
Alexander Lazov	8–9	5–8	3–1	13	2013	6
Radoslav Lukaev	7–5	4–3	3–2	5	2000	3
Mark Markov	12–7	9–4	3–3	13	1992	4
Tzvetan Mihov	1–2	0–2	1–0	2	2010	2
Yanaki Milev	2–3	2–3	0–0	4	2023	3
Vasko Mladenov	5–2	1–0	4–2	6	2016	2
Petr Nesterov	3–6	1–3	2–3	7	2022	5
Bozhidar Pampoulov	13–22	7–11	6–11	17	1967	13
Matei Pampoulov	7–13	2–3	5–10	15	1969	11
Milko Petkov	2–5	2–4	0–1	4	1992	3
Lubomir Petrov	4–9	3–8	1–1	7	1975	6
Radoslav Radev	13–3	4–1	9–2	11	1994	3
Iliyan Radulov	2–1	2–1	0–0	3	2024	3
Ruslan Rainov	5–3	5–3	0–0	6	1986	4
Rangel Rangelov	3–5	2–4	1–1	3	1964	2
Julian Stamatov	15–16	12–13	3–3	14	1980	9
Orlin Stanoytchev	10–9	9–7	1–2	11	1991	6
Ivaylo Traykov	16–14	8–8	8–6	20	1997	11
Petar Trendafilov	3–0	0–0	3–0	3	2012	1
Stefan Tzvetkov	1–2	0–0	1–2	3	1990	2
Alexander Vasilev	2–1	2–1	0–0	2	2025	2
Milen Velev	20–14	14–7	6–7	20	1988	9
Stojan Velev	5–6	4–3	1–3	5	1967	3
Milen Yanakiev	1–0	1–0	0–0	1	1986	1
Kiril Yashmakov	7–8	5–7	2–1	7	1967	4

== See also ==
- Davis Cup
- Bulgaria Billie Jean King Cup team
- Bulgaria at the Hopman Cup
