= 2014 Davis Cup =

2014 edition of the Davis Cup

Details
- Duration: 31 January – 23 November 2014
- Edition: 103rd

Champion
- Winning nation: Switzerland

The 2014 Davis Cup (also known as the 2014 Davis Cup by BNP Paribas for sponsorship purposes) was the 103rd edition of the tournament between national teams in men's tennis. The final took place between the 21–23 of November 2014 in Lille, France, with Switzerland winning the title for the first time, defeating hosts France in the final.

Mozambique made its first appearance in the tournament.

== World Group ==
Participating teams
Argentina	Australia	Belgium	Canada
Czech Republic	France	Germany	Great Britain
Italy	Japan	Kazakhstan	Netherlands
Serbia	Spain	Switzerland	United States

=== Seeds ===
1. Czech Republic (semifinals)
2. Serbia (first round)
3. Spain (first round)
4. Argentina (first round)
5. France (final)
6. United States (first round)
7. Canada (first round)
8. Kazakhstan (quarterfinals)

=== Draw ===
First round 31 January –2 February
Ostrava, Czech Republic (indoor hard)
1	Czech Republic	3
Netherlands	2
Tokyo, Japan (indoor hard)
7	Canada	1
Japan	4
Frankfurt, Germany (indoor hard)
3	Spain	1
Germany	4
La Roche sur Yon, France (indoor clay)
5	France	5
Australia	0
San Diego, United States (clay)
Great Britain	3
6	United States	1
Mar del Plata, Argentina (clay)
Italy	3
4	Argentina	1
Astana, Kazakhstan (indoor hard)
Belgium	2
8	Kazakhstan	3
Novi Sad, Serbia (indoor hard)
Switzerland	3
2	Serbia	2

Quarterfinals; 4–6 April
Tokyo, Japan (indoor hard)
1	Czech Republic	5
Japan	0
Nancy, France (indoor hard)
Germany	2
5	France	3
Naples, Italy (clay)
Great Britain	2
Italy	3
Geneva, Switzerland (indoor hard)
8	Kazakhstan	2
Switzerland	3

Semifinals; 12–14 September
Paris, France (clay)
1	Czech Republic	1
5	France	4
Geneva, Switzerland (indoor hard)
Italy	2
Switzerland	3

Final; 21–23 November
Lille, France (indoor clay)
5	France	1
Switzerland	3

=== Final ===
France
1
Stade Pierre-Mauroy, Lille, France
21–23 November 2014
Clay (i)

Switzerland
3

			1	2	3	4	5
1	(France) (Switzerland)	Jo-Wilfried Tsonga; Stan Wawrinka	1; 6	6; 3	3; 6	2; 6
2	(France) (Switzerland)	Gaël Monfils; Roger Federer	6; 1	6; 4	6; 3
3	(France) (Switzerland)	Julien Benneteau / Richard Gasquet; Roger Federer / Stan Wawrinka	3; 6	5; 7	4; 6
4	(France) (Switzerland)	Richard Gasquet; Roger Federer	4; 6	2; 6	2; 6
5	(France) (Switzerland)	Gaël Monfils; Stan Wawrinka						not played

== World Group play-offs ==
Date: 12–14 September

The eight losing teams in the World Group first round ties and eight winners of the Zonal Group I final round ties competed in the World Group play-offs for spots in the 2015 World Group. The draw took place on April 8 in London, England.

Seeded teams

- Serbia
- Spain
- Argentina
- Canada
- United States
- Australia
- Netherlands
- Belgium

Unseeded teams

- Brazil
- Colombia
- India
- Israel
- Croatia
- Slovakia
- Ukraine
- Uzbekistan

Home team	Score	Visiting team	Location	Venue	Door	Surface
India	2–3	Serbia	Bangalore	KSLTA Tennis Stadium	Outdoor	Hard
Brazil	3–1	Spain	São Paulo	Ginásio do Ibirapuera	Indoor	Clay
Israel	2–3	Argentina	Sunrise, United States	Sunrise Tennis Club	Outdoor	Hard
Canada	3–2	Colombia	Halifax	Halifax Metro Centre	Indoor	Hard
United States	5–0	Slovakia	Chicago	Sears Centre	Indoor	Hard
Australia	5–0	Uzbekistan	Perth	Cottesloe Tennis Club	Outdoor	Grass
Netherlands	2–3	Croatia	Amsterdam	Ziggo Dome	Indoor	Clay
Ukraine	2–3	Belgium	Tallinn, Estonia	Tere Tennis Centre	Indoor	Hard

Note: Due to security concerns, the International Tennis Federation Board of Directors decided to move the World Group play-off ties originally scheduled to be held in Israel and Ukraine. Israel and Ukraine exercised their option of nominating neutral venues for their ties against Argentina and Belgium, respectively.

- Argentina, Australia, Belgium, Canada, Serbia and United States remained in the World Group in 2015.
- Brazil and Croatia were promoted to the World Group in 2015.
- Colombia, India Israel, Slovakia, Ukraine and Uzbekistan remained in Zonal Group I in 2015.
- Netherlands and Spain were relegated to Zonal Group I in 2015.

== Americas Zone ==
=== Group I ===
Seeds:

1. Brazil
2. Colombia

Remaining nations:

- Dominican Republic
- Ecuador
- Uruguay
- Venezuela

==== Draw ====
Second Round Play-offs
Caracas, Venezuela (hard)
Venezuela	1
Uruguay	4

First Round Play-offs
bye
Venezuela
Uruguay
bye

First Round
1	Brazil
bye
Guayaquil, Ecuador (clay)
Ecuador	3
Venezuela	2
Santo Domingo Este, Dominican Republic (hard)
Dominican Republic	4
Uruguay	0
bye
2	Colombia

Second Round
Guayaquil, Ecuador (clay)
1	Brazil	3
Ecuador	1
Cali, Colombia (clay)
Dominican Republic	1
2	Colombia	4

- Venezuela relegated to Group II in 2015.
- Brazil and Colombia advance to World Group Play-off.

=== Group II ===
Seeds:

1. Chile
2. Mexico
3. Peru
4. El Salvador

Remaining nations:

- Barbados
- Bolivia
- Guatemala
- Paraguay

==== Draw ====
Play-offs
Santiago, Chile (clay)
1	Chile	5
Paraguay	0
Cochabamba, Bolivia (clay)
Bolivia	3
Guatemala	1

First round
Bridgetown, Barbados (hard)
1	Chile	2
Barbados	3
Asunción, Paraguay (clay)
4	El Salvador	3
Paraguay	2
Trinidad, Bolivia (clay)
Bolivia	2
3	Peru	3
Guatemala City, Guatemala (hard)
Guatemala	2
2	Mexico	3

Second round
Bridgetown, Barbados (hard)
Barbados	4
4	El Salvador	1
Puebla, Mexico (hard)
3	Peru	2
2	Mexico	3

Third round
Bridgetown, Barbados (hard)
Barbados	3
Mexico	2

- Paraguay and Guatemala relegated to Group III in 2015.
- Barbados promoted to Group I in 2015.

=== Group III ===
- Venue: Palmas Athletic Club, Humacao, Puerto Rico (outdoor hard)
- Date: 2 - 7 June

Rank	Team
1	Puerto Rico
2	Costa Rica
3	Cuba
4	Bahamas
5	Honduras
6	Bermuda
7	Panama
8	Jamaica
9	Trinidad and Tobago

- Puerto Rico and Costa Rica promoted to Group II in 2015.

== Asia/Oceania Zone ==
=== Group I ===
Seeds:

1. Uzbekistan
2. South Korea

Remaining nations:

- China
- Chinese Taipei
- India
- New Zealand

==== Draw ====
Second Round Play-offs
Christchurch, NZ (hard, indoor)
New Zealand	4
Chinese Taipei	1

First Round Play-offs
bye
New Zealand
Kaohsiung City, Taiwan (hard, indoor)
Chinese Taipei	1
2	South Korea	3

First Round
1	Uzbekistan
bye
Tianjin, China (hard, indoor)
New Zealand	1
China	3
Indore, India (hard)
Chinese Taipei	0
India	5
bye
2	South Korea

Second Round
Tianjin, China (hard)
1	Uzbekistan	3
China	2
Busan, Korea Republic (hard)
India	3
2	South Korea	1

- Chinese Taipei relegated to Group II in 2015.
- Uzbekistan and India advance to World Group Play-off.

=== Group II ===
Seeds:

1. Philippines
2. Indonesia
3. Thailand
4. Pakistan

Remaining nations:

- Hong Kong
- Kuwait
- Sri Lanka
- Vietnam

==== Draw ====
Play-offs
Da Lat, Vietnam (hard)
Sri Lanka	3
Vietnam	2
Jakarta, Indonesia (hard)
Hong Kong	1
2	Indonesia	3

First Round
Colombo, Sri Lanka (hard)
1	Philippines	3
Sri Lanka	1
Da Lat, Vietnam (hard)
4	Pakistan	3
Vietnam	2
Phuket, Thailand (hard, indoor)
Hong Kong	1
3	Thailand	4
Mishref, Kuwait (hard)
Kuwait	3
2	Indonesia	2

Second Round
Manila, Philippines (clay)
1	Philippines	2
4	Pakistan	3
Nonthaburi, Thailand (hard)
3	Thailand	4
Kuwait	1

Third Round
Nonthaburi, Thailand (hard)
4	Pakistan	1
3	Thailand	4

- Vietnam and Hong Kong relegated to Group III in 2015.
- Thailand promoted to Group I in 2015.

=== Group III ===
- Venue: Enghelab Sport Complex, Tehran, Iran (outdoor clay)
- Date: 11–14 June

Rank	Team
1	Iran
2	Lebanon
3	Malaysia
4	Syria
5	Cambodia
6	Turkmenistan
7	United Arab Emirates
8	Singapore

- Iran and Lebanon promoted to Group II in 2015.
- United Arab Emirates and Singapore relegated to Group IV in 2015.

=== Group IV ===
- Venue: Enghelab Sport Complex, Tehran, Iran (outdoor clay)
- Date: 9–14 June

Rank	Team
1	Saudi Arabia
2	Qatar
3	Pacific Oceania
4	Jordan
5	Bangladesh
6	Mongolia
7	Iraq
8	Bahrain
9	Kyrgyzstan
10	Oman

- Saudi Arabia and Qatar promoted to Group III in 2015.

== Europe/Africa Zone ==
=== Group I ===
Seeds:

1. Croatia
2. Austria
3. Israel
4. Sweden

Remaining nations:

- Latvia
- Poland
- Portugal
- Romania
- Russia
- Slovakia
- Slovenia
- Ukraine

==== Draw ====
All seeded teams get a bye into the second round.

Second round play-offs
Moscow, Russia (indoor hard)
Russia	4
Portugal	1
Jönköping, Sweden (indoor hard)
4	Sweden	3
Latvia	2

First round play-offs
bye
Russia
bye
Portugal
Bucharest, Romania (clay)
Romania	3
4	Sweden	1
Valmiera, Latvia (indoor hard)
Latvia	1
2	Austria	4

First round
1	Croatia
bye
Moscow, Russia (hard, indoor)
Russia	2
Poland	3
3	Israel
bye
Kranj, Slovenia (hard, indoor)
Portugal	2
Slovenia	3
Dnipropetrovsk, Ukraine (hard, indoor)
Ukraine	3
Romania	1
bye
4	Sweden
Bratislava, Slovak Rep. (hard, indoor)
Slovakia	5
Latvia	0
bye
2	Austria

Second round
Warsaw, Poland (hard, indoor)
1	Croatia	3
Poland	1
Portorož, Slovenia (clay)
3	Israel	3
Slovenia	1
Malmö, Sweden (hard, indoor)
Ukraine	4
4	Sweden	1
Bratislava, Slovakia (hard, indoor)
Slovakia	4
2	Austria	1

- Portugal and Latvia relegated to Group II in 2015.
- Croatia, Israel, Ukraine, and Slovakia advance to World Group Play-off.

=== Group II ===
Seeds:

1. South Africa
2. Denmark
3. Finland
4. Moldova
5. Bosnia and Herzegovina
6. Belarus
7. Luxembourg
8. Lithuania

Remaining nations:

- Bulgaria
- Cyprus
- Egypt
- Greece
- Ireland
- Monaco
- Morocco
- Norway

==== Draw ====
Play-offs
Oslo, Norway (hard, indoor)
Monaco	5
Norway	0
Athens, Greece (clay)
Bulgaria	4
Greece	1
Dublin, Ireland (hard, indoor)
Ireland	3
Egypt	2
Casablanca, Morocco (clay)
Morocco	4
Cyprus	1

First round
Centurion, South Africa (hard)
1	South Africa	3
Monaco	2
Oslo, Norway (hard, indoor)
8	Lithuania	5
Norway	0
Helsinki, Finland (hard, indoor)
3	Finland	3
Bulgaria	2
Sarajevo, Bosnia-Herz. (carpet, indoor)
5	Bosnia and Herzegovina	3
Greece	1
Minsk, Belarus (hard, indoor)
Ireland	1
6	Belarus	4
Chișinău, Moldova (hard, indoor)
Egypt	1
4	Moldova	4
Rabat, Morocco (clay)
Morocco	2
7	Luxembourg	3
Copenhagen, Denmark (hard, indoor)
Cyprus	1
2	Denmark	4

Second round
Centurion, South Africa (hard)
1	South Africa	2
8	Lithuania	3
Helsinki, Finland (hard, indoor)
3	Finland	2
5	Bosnia and Herzegovina	3
Chișinău, Moldova (hard, indoor)
6	Belarus	1
4	Moldova	4
Hillerød, Denmark (hard, indoor)
7	Luxembourg	0
2	Denmark	5

Third round
Sarajevo, Bosnia-Herz. (hard, indoor)
8	Lithuania	3
5	Bosnia and Herzegovina	2
Kolding, Denmark (carpet, indoor)
4	Moldova	2
2	Denmark	3

- Norway, Greece, Egypt, and Cyprus relegated to Group III in 2015.
- Lithuania and Denmark promoted to Group I in 2015.

=== Group III Europe ===
- Venue: Gellért Szabadidőközpont, Szeged, Hungary (outdoor clay)
- Date: 7–10 May

Rank	Team
1	Hungary
1	Turkey
3	Georgia
3	Macedonia
5	Estonia
5	Montenegro
7	Liechtenstein
7	Malta
9	Armenia
9	San Marino
11	Albania
11	Iceland

- Hungary and Turkey were promoted to Europe/Africa Zone Group II in 2015.

=== Group III Africa ===
- Venue: Smash Tennis Academy, Cairo, Egypt (outdoor clay)
- Date: 8–13 September

Rank	Team
1	Madagascar
1	Zimbabwe
3	Algeria
3	Namibia
5	Benin
6	Nigeria
7	Mozambique
8	Congo
9	Botswana

- Madagascar and Zimbabwe were promoted to Europe/Africa Zone Group II in 2015.
- Tunisia was suspended from Davis Cup competition for one year for violation of ITF rules, after the Tunisian Tennis Federation ordered Malek Jaziri not to play against Israeli opponent Amir Weintraub during the 2013 Tashkent Challenger, an ATP Challenger Tour event in October 2013.

== See also ==
- 2014 Fed Cup
