= Slovenia Davis Cup team =

National tennis team

Slovenia
- Captain: Grega Žemlja
- Nations Ranking: 58 (21 September 2026)
- Colors: Blue & White
- First year: 1993
- Years played: 33
- Ties played (W–L): 76 (42−34)
- Best finish: World Group I playoffs (2020–21, 2022, 2023, 2026, 2027)
- Most total wins: Grega Žemlja (33−31)
- Most singles wins: Marko Tkalec (25−9)
- Most doubles wins: Grega Žemlja (12−15)
- Most ties played: Grega Žemlja (29)
- Most years played: Grega Žemlja (13)

The Slovenia Davis Cup team represents Slovenia in Davis Cup tennis competition and is governed by the Slovenian Tennis Association.

== Current team ==
The following players represented the team in 2026 Davis Cup ties.

- Bor Artnak (singles) [1–1]
- Sebastian Dominko (singles, doubles) [1–1, 1–0]
- Filip Jeff Planinšek (singles, doubles) [2–0, 0–1]
- Žiga Šeško (doubles) [1–1]

== List of matches ==
=== 1990s ===
Year	Competition	Round	Date	Location	Opponent	Surface	Score	Result
1993	Europe/Africa Zone (Group III - A)	Promotion playoffs	28 Apr	Lusaka (ZAM)	San Marino	Clay	2–1	Win
1993	Europe/Africa Zone (Group III - A)	Promotion playoffs	29 Apr	Lusaka (ZAM)	Congo	Clay	3–0	Win
1993	Europe/Africa Zone (Group III - A)	Promotion playoffs	30 Apr	Lusaka (ZAM)	Turkey	Clay	3–0	Win
1993	Europe/Africa Zone (Group III - A)	Promotion playoffs	1 May	Lusaka (ZAM)	Latvia	Clay	1–2	Loss
1993	Europe/Africa Zone (Group III - A)	Promotion playoffs	2 May	Lusaka (ZAM)	Zambia	Clay	3–0	Win
1994	Europe/Africa Zone (Group II)	First round	29 Apr–1 May	Maribor (SLO)	Greece	Clay	3–2	Win
1994	Europe/Africa Zone (Group II)	First round	15–17 Jul	Ljubljana (SLO)	Finland	Clay	3–2	Win
1994	Europe/Africa Zone (Group II)	First round	23–26 Sep	Accra (GHA)	Ghana	Hard	3–2	Win
1995	Europe/Africa Zone (Group I)	First round	31 Mar–2 Apr	Portorož (SLO)	Zimbabwe	Clay	0–5	Loss
1995	Europe/Africa Zone (Group I)	Relegation playoffs	21–23 Sep	Ramat HaSharon (ISR)	Israel	Hard	0–5	Loss
1996	Europe/Africa Zone (Group II)	First round	3–5 May	Newcastle upon Tyne (GBR)	Great Britain	Carpet (i)	1–4	Loss
1996	Europe/Africa Zone (Group II)	Relegation playoffs	12–14 Jul	Novo Mesto (SLO)	Malta	Clay	5–0	Win
1997	Europe/Africa Zone (Group II)	First round	2–4 May	Tbilisi (GEO)	Georgia	Clay	3–2	Win
1997	Europe/Africa Zone (Group II)	Second round	11–13 Jul	Nova Gorica (SLO)	Norway	Clay	1–4	Loss
1998	Europe/Africa Zone (Group II)	First round	1–3 May	Roquebrune-Cap-Martin (MON)	Monaco	Clay	5–0	Win
1998	Europe/Africa Zone (Group II)	Second round	17–19 Jul	Budapest (HUN)	Hungary	Clay	2–3	Loss
1999	Europe/Africa Zone (Group II)	First round	30 Apr–2 May	Dublin (IRL)	Ireland	Carpet (i)	2–3	Loss
1999	Europe/Africa Zone (Group II)	Relegation playoffs	16–18 Jul	Ljubljana (SLO)	Senegal	Clay	5–0	Win

=== 2000s ===
Year	Competition	Round	Date	Location	Opponent	Surface	Score	Result
2000	Europe/Africa Zone (Group II)	First round	28–30 Apr	Cairo (EGY)	Egypt	Clay	3–2	Win
2000	Europe/Africa Zone (Group II)	Second round	21–23 Jul	Szczecin (POL)	Poland	Clay	3–2	Win
2000	Europe/Africa Zone (Group II)	Third round	6–8 Oct	Athens (GRE)	Greece	Clay	4–1	Win
2001	Europe/Africa Zone (Group I)	First round	9–11 Feb	Helsinki (FIN)	Finland	Carpet (i)	2–3	Loss
2001	Europe/Africa Zone (Group I)	Second round playoffs	21–23 Sep	Harare (ZIM)	Zimbabwe	Hard (i)	2–3	Loss
2002	Europe/Africa Zone (Group II)	First round	3–5 May	Ljubljana (SLO)	Ghana	Clay	4–1	Win
2002	Europe/Africa Zone (Group II)	Second round	12–14 Jul	Portorož (SLO)	Ireland	Clay	3–2	Win
2002	Europe/Africa Zone (Group II)	Third round	20–22 Sep	Esch-sur-Alzette (LUX)	Luxembourg	Hard (i)	2–3	Loss
2003	Europe/Africa Zone (Group II)	First round	4–6 Apr	Accra (GHA)	Ghana	Hard	4–1	Win
2003	Europe/Africa Zone (Group II)	Second round	11–13 Jul	Hornbæk (DEN)	Denmark	Hard	1–4	Loss
2004	Europe/Africa Zone (Group II)	First round	9–11 Apr	Portorož (SLO)	Poland	Clay	2–3	Loss
2004	Europe/Africa Zone (Group II)	Relegation playoffs	16–18 Jul	—	Denmark	—	w/o	(Win)
2005	Europe/Africa Zone (Group II)	First round	4–6 Mar	Kranj (SLO)	Ivory Coast	Hard (i)	5–0	Win
2005	Europe/Africa Zone (Group II)	Second round	15–17 Jul	Kranj (SLO)	Latvia	Clay	5–0	Win
2005	Europe/Africa Zone (Group II)	Third round	23–25 Sep	Estoril (POR)	Portugal	Clay	1–4	Loss
2006	Europe/Africa Zone (Group II)	First round	7–9 Apr	Algiers (ALG)	Algeria	Clay	2–3	Loss
2006	Europe/Africa Zone (Group II)	Relegation playoffs	21–23 Jul	Dublin (IRL)	Ireland	Grass	4–1	Win
2007	Europe/Africa Zone (Group II)	First round	6–8 Apr	Tallinn (EST)	Estonia	Carpet (i)	3–2	Win
2007	Europe/Africa Zone (Group II)	Second round	20–22 Jul	Portorož (SLO)	Morocco	Hard	2–3	Loss
2008	Europe/Africa Zone (Group II)	First round	11–13 Apr	Nicosia (CYP)	Cyprus	Hard	2–3	Loss
2008	Europe/Africa Zone (Group II)	Relegation playoffs	18–20 Jul	Tunis (TUN)	Tunisia	Clay	4–1	Win
2009	Europe/Africa Zone (Group II)	First round	6–8 Mar	Otočec (SLO)	Egypt	Carpet (i)	5–0	Win
2009	Europe/Africa Zone (Group II)	Second round	10–12 Jul	Otočec (SLO)	Lithuania	Clay	5–0	Win
2009	Europe/Africa Zone (Group II)	Third round	18–20 Sep	Jūrmala (LAT)	Latvia	Carpet (i)	2–3	Loss

=== 2010s ===
Year	Competition	Round	Date	Location	Opponent	Surface	Score	Result
2010	Europe/Africa Zone (Group II)	First round	5–7 Mar	Oslo (NOR)	Norway	Hard (i)	5–0	Win
2010	Europe/Africa Zone (Group II)	Second round	9–11 Jul	Otočec (SLO)	Bulgaria	Clay	5–0	Win
2010	Europe/Africa Zone (Group II)	Third round	17–19 Sep	Vilnius (LIT)	Lithuania	Hard (i)	3–2	Win
2011	Europe/Africa Zone (Group I)	First round	4–6 Mar	Ljubljana (SLO)	Finland	Clay (i)	3–2	Win
2011	Europe/Africa Zone (Group I)	Second round	8–10 Jul	Arzachena (ITA)	Italy	Clay	0–5	Loss
2012	Europe/Africa Zone (Group I)	First round	10–12 Feb	Velenje (SLO)	Denmark	Hard (i)	5–0	Win
2012	Europe/Africa Zone (Group I)	Second round	6–8 Apr	Johannesburg (RSA)	South Africa	Hard	1–4	Loss
2013	Europe/Africa Zone (Group I)	First round	1–3 Feb	Wrocław (POL)	Poland	Hard (i)	2–3	Loss
2013	Europe/Africa Zone (Group I)	First round playoffs	13–15 Sep	Ljubljana (SLO)	South Africa	Clay	4–1	Win
2014	Europe/Africa Zone (Group I)	First round	31 Jan–2 Feb	Kranj (SLO)	Portugal	Hard (i)	3–2	Win
2014	Europe/Africa Zone (Group I)	Second round	4–6 Apr	Portorož (SLO)	Israel	Clay	1–3	Loss
2015	Europe/Africa Zone (Group I)	First round	6–8 Mar	Bratislava (SVK)	Slovakia	Hard (i)	0–5	Loss
2015	Europe/Africa Zone (Group I)	First round playoffs	17–19 Jul	Tel Aviv (ISR)	Israel	Hard (i)	2–3	Loss
2015	Europe/Africa Zone (Group I)	Second round playoffs	30 Oct–1 Nov	Kranj (SLO)	Lithuania	Hard (i)	5–0	Win
2016	Europe/Africa Zone (Group I)	First Round	4–6 Mar	Arad (ROM)	Romania	Hard (i)	1–4	Loss
2016	Europe/Africa Zone (Group I)	Second round playoffs	16–18 Sep	Viana do Castelo (POR)	Portugal	Clay	0–5	Loss
2017	Europe/Africa Zone (Group II)	First Round	3–5 Feb	Maribor (SLO)	Monaco	Hard (i)	3–2	Win
2017	Europe/Africa Zone (Group II)	Second round	7–9 Apr	Centurion (RSA)	South Africa	Hard	0–5	Loss
2018	Europe/Africa Zone (Group II)	First Round	3–4 Feb	Maribor (SLO)	Poland	Hard (i)	2–3	Loss
2018	Europe/Africa Zone (Group II)	Relegation playoffs	7–8 Apr	Portorož (SLO)	Turkey	Clay	3–2	Win
2019	Europe/Africa Zone (Group II)	Playoffs	13–14 Sep	Cairo (EGY)	Egypt	Clay	3–1	Win

=== 2020s ===
Year	Competition	Round	Date	Location	Opponent	Surface	Score	Result
2020–21	World Group I	Playoffs	8–9 Mar 2020	Islamabad (PAK)	Pakistan	Grass	0–3	Loss
2020–21	World Group II	Promotion playoffs	17–18 Sep 2021	Portorož (SLO)	Paraguay	Clay	3–1	Win
2022	World Group I	Playoffs	4–5 Mar	Viña del Mar (CHI)	Chile	Clay	0–4	Loss
2022	World Group II	Promotion playoffs	16–17 Sep	Portorož (SLO)	Estonia	Clay	4–0	Win
2023	World Group I	Playoffs	3–4 Feb	Istanbul (TUR)	Turkey	Hard (i)	0–4	Loss
2023	World Group II	Promotion playoffs	15–16 Sep	Ljubljana (SLO)	Luxembourg	Clay	2–3	Loss
2024	World Group II	Playoffs	2–3 Feb	Guangzhou (CHN)	China	Hard	2–3	Loss
2024	Group III (Europe Zone)	Pool A	20 Jun	Ulcinj (MNE)	North Macedonia	Clay	1–2	Loss
2024	Group III (Europe Zone)	Pool A	21 Jun	Ulcinj (MNE)	Montenegro	Clay	2–1	Win
2024	Group III (Europe Zone)	Promotion final	22 Jun	Ulcinj (MNE)	Moldova	Clay	2–1	Win
2025	World Group II	Playoffs	31 Jan–1 Feb	Velenje (SLO)	Indonesia	Clay (i)	4–0	Win
2025	World Group II	Promotion playoffs	12–13 Sep	Ljubljana (SLO)	Uruguay	Hard	4–0	Win
2026	World Group I	Playoffs	6–8 Feb	Velenje (SLO)	Turkey	Clay (i)	1–3	Loss
2026	World Group II	Promotion playoffs	18-19 Sep	Ljubljana (SLO)	Israel	Clay	4–0	Win
2027	World Group I	Playoffs	6–8 Feb	TBD (SLO)	Greece	TBD	TBD	TBD
2027	TBD	TBD	TBD	TBD	TBD	TBD	TBD	TBD

== Statistics ==
=== Home and away record ===
As of 20 September 2026

- Performance at home: 23–8 (74%) against 26 different opponents
- Performance away: 14–24 (37%) against 31 different opponents
- Performance at neutral venues: 5–2 (71%) against 7 different opponents
- Total: 42–34 (55%) against 44 different opponents

=== Head-to-head record ===
As of 20 September 2026 (after the 76th tie, a 4–0 win over Israel)

Nation	Ties	W–L	Win %	Court Surface				Setting		Venue			Played	
Nation	Ties	W–L	Win %	Clay	Hard	Grass	Carpet	Indoor	Outdoor	Home	Away	Neutral	First	Last
Algeria	1	0–1	0%	0–1	—	—	—	—	0–1	—	0–1	—	2006	(2006)
Bulgaria	1	1–0	100%	1–0	—	—	—	—	1–0	1–0	—	—	2010	(2010)
Chile	1	0–1	0%	0–1	—	—	—	—	0–1	—	0–1	—	2022	(2022)
China	1	0–1	0%	—	0–1	—	—	—	0–1	—	0–1	—	2024	(2024)
Congo	1	1–0	100%	1–0	—	—	—	—	1–0	—	—	1–0	1993	(1993)
Cyprus	1	0–1	0%	—	0–1	—	—	—	0–1	—	0–1	—	2008	(2008)
Denmark ^{1}	2	1–1	50%	—	1–1	—	—	1–0	0–1	1–0	0–1	—	2003	2012
Egypt	3	3–0	100%	2–0	—	—	1–0	1–0	2–0	1–0	2–0	—	2000	2019
Estonia	2	2–0	100%	1–0	—	—	1–0	1–0	1–0	1–0	1–0	—	2007	2022
Finland	3	2–1	67%	2–0	—	—	0–1	1–1	1–0	2–0	0–1	—	1994	2011
Georgia	1	1–0	100%	1–0	—	—	—	—	1–0	—	1–0	—	1997	(1997)
Ghana	3	3–0	100%	1–0	2–0	—	—	—	3–0	1–0	2–0	—	1994	2003
Great Britain	1	0–1	0%	—	—	—	0–1	0–1	—	—	0–1	—	1996	(1996)
Greece	2	2–0	100%	2–0	—	—	—	—	2–0	1–0	1–0	—	1994	2000
Hungary	1	0–1	0%	0–1	—	—	—	—	0–1	—	0–1	—	1998	(1998)
Indonesia	1	1–0	100%	1–0	—	—	—	1–0	—	1–0	—	—	2025	(2025)
Ireland	3	2–1	67%	1–0	—	1–0	0–1	0–1	2–0	1–0	1–1	—	1999	2006
Israel	4	1–3	25%	1–1	0–2	—	—	0–1	1–2	1–1	0–2	—	1995	2026
Italy	1	0–1	0%	0–1	—	—	—	—	0–1	—	0–1	—	2011	(2011)
Ivory Coast	1	1–0	100%	—	1–0	—	—	1–0	—	1–0	—	—	2005	(2005)
Latvia	3	1–2	33%	1–1	—	—	0–1	0–1	1–1	1–0	0–1	0–1	1993	2009
Lithuania	3	3–0	100%	1–0	2–0	—	—	2–0	1–0	2–0	1–0	—	2009	2015
Luxembourg	2	0–2	0%	0–1	0–1	—	—	0–1	0–1	0–1	0–1	—	2002	2023
Malta	1	1–0	100%	1–0	—	—	—	—	1–0	1–0	—	—	1996	(1996)
Moldova	1	1–0	100%	1–0	—	—	—	—	1–0	—	—	1–0	2024	(2024)
Monaco	2	2–0	100%	1–0	1–0	—	—	1–0	1–0	1–0	1–0	—	1998	2017
Montenegro	1	1–0	100%	1–0	—	—	—	—	1–0	—	1–0	—	2024	(2024)
Morocco	1	0–1	0%	—	0–1	—	—	—	0–1	0–1	—	—	2007	(2007)
North Macedonia	1	0–1	0%	0–1	—	—	—	—	0–1	—	—	0–1	2024	(2024)
Norway	2	1–1	50%	0–1	1–0	—	—	1–0	0–1	0–1	1–0	—	1997	2010
Pakistan	1	0–1	0%	—	—	0–1	—	—	0–1	—	0–1	—	2020	(2020)
Paraguay	1	1–0	100%	1–0	—	—	—	—	1–0	1–0	—	—	2020	(2020)
Poland	4	1–3	25%	1–1	0–2	—	—	0–2	1–1	0–2	1–1	—	2000	2018
Portugal	3	1–2	33%	0–2	1–0	—	—	1–0	0–2	1–0	0–2	—	2005	2016
Romania	1	0–1	0%	—	0–1	—	—	0–1	—	—	0–1	—	2016	(2016)
San Marino	1	1–0	100%	1–0	—	—	—	—	1–0	—	—	1–0	1993	(1993)
Senegal	1	1–0	100%	1–0	—	—	—	—	1–0	1–0	—	—	1999	(1999)
Slovakia	1	0–1	0%	—	0–1	—	—	0–1	—	—	0–1	—	2015	(2015)
South Africa	3	1–2	33%	1–0	0–2	—	—	—	1–2	1–0	0–2	—	2012	2017
Tunisia	1	1–0	100%	1–0	—	—	—	—	1–0	—	1–0	—	2008	(2008)
Turkey	4	2–2	50%	2–1	0–1	—	—	0–2	2–0	1–1	0–1	1–0	1993	2026
Uruguay	1	1–0	100%	—	1–0	—	—	—	1–0	1–0	—	—	2025	(2025)
Zambia	1	1–0	100%	1–0	—	—	—	—	1–0	—	—	1–0	1993	(1993)
Zimbabwe	2	0–2	0%	0–1	0–1	—	—	0–1	0–1	0–1	0–1	—	1995	2001
44	76	42–34	55%	29–14	10–15	1–1	2–4	11–13	31–21	23–8	14–24	5–2	1993	2026
Nations	Ties	W–L	Win %	Clay	Hard	Grass	Carpet	Indoor	Outdoor	Home	Away	Neutral	First	Last

Notes

^{1} Does not include ties where a walkover occurred:
- 2004 win against Denmark in the Relegation playoffs

=== Ties by decade ===
Decade	Played	Won	Lost	Win %
1990–1999	18	11	7	61.1%
2000–2009	23	13	10	56.5%
2010–2019	21	11	10	52.4%
2020–2026	14	7	7	50.0%
Total	76	42	34	55.3%

Note

Ties where a walkover occurred are not included in the tally:
- 2000-2009 (1 tie)

=== Host cities ===
As of 20 September 2026, 8 cities in Slovenia have hosted a total of 31 home turf ties.

City	Ties	%	Years
Ljubljana	8	25.8%	1994, 1999, 2002, 2011, 2013, 2023, 2025, 2026
Portorož	8	25.8%	1995, 2002, 2004, 2007, 2014, 2018, 2021, 2022
Kranj	4	12.9%	2005 (twice), 2014, 2015
Maribor	3	9.7%	1994, 2017, 2018
Otočec	3	9.7%	2009 (twice), 2010
Velenje	3	9.7%	2012, 2025, 2026
Nova Gorica	1	3.2%	1997
Novo Mesto	1	3.2%	1996

== See also ==
- Davis Cup
- Slovenia Billie Jean King Cup team
