= Gelora Bung Karno =

Gelora Bung Karno can refer to several things:

- Gelora Bung Karno Stadium
- Istora Gelora Bung Karno
- Gelora Bung Karno Aquatic Stadium
- Gelora Bung Karno Madya Stadium
- Gelora Bung Karno Sports Complex
- Gelora Bung Karno (Transjakarta)
