= 2011 Davis Cup =

2011 edition of the Davis Cup

Details
- Duration: 4 March – 4 December 2011
- Edition: 100th

Champion
- Winning nation: Spain

The 2011 Davis Cup (also known as the 2011 Davis Cup by BNP Paribas for sponsorship purposes) was the 100th edition of a tournament between national teams in men's tennis. Spain was the championship team, winning the final over Argentina, 3–1.

The draw took place in September 2010 in Brussels, Belgium.

== World Group ==
Participating Teams
Argentina	Austria	Belgium	Chile
Croatia	Czech Republic	France	Germany
India	Kazakhstan	Romania	Russia
Serbia	Spain	Sweden	United States

Seeds:

1. Serbia
2. France
3. Spain
4. Czech Republic
5. Argentina
6. United States
7. Russia
8. Croatia

=== Draw ===
First round 4–6 March
Novi Sad, Serbia (indoor hard)
1	Serbia	4
India	1
Borås, Sweden (indoor hard)
7	Russia	2
Sweden	3
Ostrava, Czech Republic (indoor hard)
4	Czech Republic	2
Kazakhstan	3
Buenos Aires, Argentina (clay)
5	Argentina	4
Romania	1
Santiago, Chile (clay)
Chile	1
6	United States	4
Charleroi, Belgium (indoor hard)
Belgium	1
3	Spain	4
Zagreb, Croatia (indoor hard)
Germany	3
8	Croatia	2
Vienna, Austria (indoor clay)
Austria	2
2	France	3

Quarterfinals; 8–10 July
Halmstad, Sweden (indoor hard)
1	Serbia	4
Sweden	1
Buenos Aires, Argentina (clay) 7–9 July
Kazakhstan	0
5	Argentina	5
Austin, United States (indoor hard)
6	United States	1
3	Spain	3
Stuttgart, Germany (clay)
Germany	1
2	France	4

Semifinals; 16–18 September
Belgrade, Serbia (indoor hard)
1	Serbia	2
5	Argentina	3
Córdoba, Spain (clay)
3	Spain	4
2	France	1

Final; 2–4 December
Seville, Spain (clay)
5	Argentina	1
3	Spain	3

=== Final ===
Spain
3
Estadio Olímpico, Seville, Spain
2–4 December 2011
Clay (i)

Argentina
1

			1	2	3	4	5
1	(Spain) (Argentina)	Rafael Nadal; Juan Mónaco	6; 1	6; 1	6; 2
2	(Spain) (Argentina)	David Ferrer; Juan Martín del Potro	6; 2	6^{2} 7^{7}	3; 6	6; 4	6; 3
3	(Spain) (Argentina)	Feliciano López / Fernando Verdasco; David Nalbandian / Eduardo Schwank	4; 6	2; 6	3; 6
4	(Spain) (Argentina)	Rafael Nadal; Juan Martín del Potro	1; 6	6; 4	6; 1	7^{7} 6^{0}
5	(Spain) (Argentina)	David Ferrer; David Nalbandian						not played

== World Group play-offs ==
Date: 16–18 September

The eight losing teams in the World Group first round ties and eight winners of the Zonal Group I final round ties will compete in the World Group play-offs for spots in the 2012 World Group.

Seeded teams

1. Czech Republic
2. Russia
3. Israel
4. Croatia
5. Chile
6. India
7. Austria
8. Switzerland

Unseeded teams

- Australia
- Belgium
- Brazil
- Canada
- Italy
- Japan
- Romania
- South Africa

Home team	Score	Visiting team	Location	Venue	Door	Surface
Romania	0–5	Czech Republic	Bucharest	Centrul National De Tenis	Outdoor	Clay
Russia	3–2	Brazil	Kazan	Kazan Tennis Academy	Indoor	Hard
Israel	2–3	Canada	Ramat HaSharon	Canada Stadium	Outdoor	Hard
South Africa	1–4	Croatia	Potchefstroom	Fanie du Toit Sports Complex	Outdoor	Hard
Chile	1–4	Italy	Santiago	Estadio Nacional	Outdoor	Hard
Japan	4–1	India	Tokyo	Ariake Coliseum	Outdoor	Hard
Belgium	1–4	Austria	Antwerp	Lotto Arena	Indoor	Hard
Australia	2–3	Switzerland	Sydney	Royal Sydney Golf Club	Outdoor	Grass

- Austria, Croatia, Czech Republic and Russia will remain in the World Group in 2012.
- Canada, Italy, Japan and Switzerland are promoted to the World Group in 2012.
- Australia, Brazil, Israel, and South Africa will remain in Zonal Group I in 2012.
- Belgium, Chile, India and Romania are relegated to Zonal Group I in 2012.

== Americas Zone ==
=== Group I ===
Seeds:

1. Ecuador
2. Brazil

Remaining Nations:

- Canada
- Colombia
- Mexico
- Uruguay

==== Draw ====
Second-round play-offs
Mexico City, Mexico (clay)
Mexico	0
Colombia	5

First-round play-offs
Guayaquil, Ecuador (clay)
1	Ecuador	3
Mexico	2
Colombia
bye

First Round
1	Ecuador
bye
Metepec, Mexico (clay)
Mexico	1
Canada	4
Montevideo, Uruguay (clay)
Uruguay	4
Colombia	1
bye
2	Brazil

Second Round
Guayaquil, Ecuador (clay)
1	Ecuador	2
Canada	3
Montevideo, Uruguay (clay)
Uruguay	0
2	Brazil	5

- Mexico relegated to Group II in 2012.
- Canada and Brazil advance to World Group play-off.

=== Group II ===
Seeds:

1. Peru
2. Venezuela
3. Dominican Republic
4. Paraguay

Remaining Nations:

- El Salvador
- Haiti
- Netherlands Antilles
- Puerto Rico

==== Draw ====
Play-offs
Santa Tecla, El Salvador (clay)
Netherlands Antilles	2
El Salvador	3
Mayagüez, Puerto Rico (hard)
Puerto Rico	4
Haiti	1

First Round
Lima, Peru (clay)
1	Peru	5
Netherlands Antilles	0
Santa Tecla, El Salvador (clay)
3	Dominican Republic	5
El Salvador	0
Mayagüez, Puerto Rico (hard)
Puerto Rico	1
4	Paraguay	4
Caracas, Venezuela (hard)
Haiti	2
2	Venezuela	3

Second Round
Lima, Peru (clay)
1	Peru	3
3	Dominican Republic	1
Asunción, Paraguay (clay)
4	Paraguay	3
2	Venezuela	1

Third Round
Asunción, Paraguay (clay)
1	Peru	3
4	Paraguay	1

- Netherlands Antilles and Haiti relegated to Group III in 2012.
- Peru promoted to Group I in 2012.

=== Group III ===
- Venue: Club de Tenis Santa Cruz, Santa Cruz, Bolivia (outdoor clay)
- Date: 15-19 June

Rank	Team
1	Bolivia
2	Barbados
3	Guatemala
4	Costa Rica
5	Bahamas
6	Aruba
7	Jamaica
8	Honduras

- Bolivia and Barbados promoted to Group II in 2012.
- Jamaica and Honduras finished in the relegation places. However, in 2012 Groups III and IV were merged, so no demotion occurred.

=== Group IV ===
- Venue: Club de Tenis Santa Cruz, Santa Cruz, Bolivia (outdoor clay)
- Date: 16–18 June

Team	Pld	W	L	MF	MA	Pts
Trinidad and Tobago	2	2	0	4	2	2
Panama	2	1	1	3	3	1
U.S. Virgin Islands	2	0	2	2	4	0

All of them promoted to Group III for 2012 as Groups III and IV were merged for 2012.

== Asia/Oceania Zone ==
=== Group I ===
Seeds:

1. Australia
2. Uzbekistan

Remaining Nations:

- China
- Chinese Taipei
- Japan
- New Zealand
- Philippines

==== Draw ====
Second Round Play-offs
Lapu-Lapu City, Philippines (clay)
Chinese Taipei	3
Philippines	2

First Round Play-offs
bye
Chinese Taipei
Hawera, New Zealand (indoor hard)
Philippines	0
New Zealand	5

First Round
1	Australia
bye
Shanghai, China (indoor hard)
Chinese Taipei	2
China	3
Lapu-Lapu City, Philippines (clay)
Philippines	1
Japan	3
Namangan, Uzbekistan (indoor clay)
New Zealand	2
2	Uzbekistan	3

Second Round
Beijing, China (indoor hard)
1	Australia	3
China	1
Kobe, Japan (indoor hard)
Japan	4
2	Uzbekistan	1

- Philippines relegated to Group II in 2012.
- Australia and Japan advance to World Group play-offs.

=== Group II ===
Seeds:

1. South Korea
2. Thailand
3. Indonesia
4. Pakistan

Remaining Nations:

- Hong Kong
- Iran
- Pacific Oceania
- Syria

==== Draw ====
Play-offs
Victoria Park, Hong Kong (hard)
Syria	1
Hong Kong	4
Guam (hard)
Iran	1
Pacific Oceania	4

First Round
Changwon, South Korea (hard)
1	South Korea	4
Syria	1
Causeway Bay, Hong Kong (hard)
4	Pakistan	3
Hong Kong	2
Tehran, Iran (indoor clay)
Iran	2
3	Indonesia	3
Guam (hard)
Pacific Oceania	0
2	Thailand	5

Second Round
Gimcheon, South Korea (hard)
1	South Korea	4
4	Pakistan	0
Nonthaburi, Thailand (hard)
3	Indonesia	1
2	Thailand	4

Third Round
Gimcheon, South Korea (hard)
1	South Korea	3
2	Thailand	0

- Syria and Iran relegated to Group III in 2012.
- South Korea promoted to Group I in 2012.

=== Group III ===
- Venue: Sri Lanka Tennis Association, Colombo, Sri Lanka (outdoor hard)
- Date: 15–18 June

Rank	Team
1	Sri Lanka
2	Lebanon
3	Vietnam
4	Malaysia
5	Kuwait
6	Oman
7	United Arab Emirates
8	Myanmar

- Sri Lanka and Lebanon promoted to Group II in 2012.
- United Arab Emirates and Myanmar relegated to Group IV in 2012.

=== Group IV ===
- Venue: National Tennis Complex, Dhaka, Bangladesh (outdoor hard)
- Date: 13 - 16 April

Rank	Team
1	Bangladesh
2	Kyrgyzstan
3	Jordan
4	Iraq
5	Singapore
6	Bahrain
7	Qatar
8	Turkmenistan

- Bangladesh and Kyrgyzstan promoted to Group III in 2012.

== Europe/Africa Zone ==
=== Group I ===
Seeds:

1. Israel
2. Switzerland
3. Italy
4. South Africa

Remaining Nations:

- Finland
- Netherlands
- Poland
- Portugal
- Slovakia
- Slovenia
- Ukraine

==== Draw ====
Second Round Play-offs
Espoo, Finland (indoor hard)
Poland	2
Finland	3
Bratislava, Slovakia (indoor hard)
Ukraine	1
Slovakia	4

First Round Play-offs
bye
Poland
bye
Finland
Ukraine
bye
Slovakia
bye

First Round
1	Israel
bye
Poland
bye
3	Italy
bye
Ljubljana, Slovenia (indoor clay)
Finland	2
Slovenia	3
Kharkiv, Ukraine (indoor hard)
Ukraine	2
Netherlands	3
bye
4	South Africa
Cruz Quebrada, Portugal (clay)
Portugal	4
Slovakia	1
bye
2	Switzerland

Second Round
Ramat HaSharon, Israel (hard)
1	Israel	3
Poland	2
Arzachena, Italy (clay)
3	Italy	5
Slovenia	0
Potchefstroom, South Africa (hard)
Netherlands	1
4	South Africa	3
Bern, Switzerland (indoor hard)
Portugal	0
2	Switzerland	5

- Poland and Ukraine relegated to Group II in 2012.
- Israel, Italy, South Africa, and Switzerland advance to World Group play-off.

=== Group II ===
Seeds:

1. Great Britain
2. Latvia
3. Belarus
4. Lithuania
5. Cyprus
6. Bosnia and Herzegovina
7. Monaco
8. Ireland

Remaining Nations:

- Bulgaria
- Denmark
- Estonia
- Greece
- Hungary
- Luxembourg
- Morocco
- Tunisia

==== Draw ====
Play-offs
Dublin, Ireland (indoor hard)
Tunisia	2
8	Ireland	3
Sofia, Bulgaria (indoor hard)
Bulgaria	2
5	Cyprus	3
Vilnius, Lithuania (clay)
Morocco	5
4	Lithuania	0
Thessaloniki, Greece (clay)
7	Monaco	3
Greece	2

First round
Bolton, Great Britain (indoor hard)
1	Great Britain	4
Tunisia	1
Dublin, Ireland (indoor hard)
8	Ireland	2
Luxembourg	3
Minsk, Belarus (indoor hard)
3	Belarus	4
Bulgaria	1
Nicosia, Cyprus (hard)
5	Cyprus	0
Hungary	5
Marrakesh, Morocco (clay)
Morocco	2
6	Bosnia and Herzegovina	3
Tallinn, Estonia (indoor hard)
Estonia	3
4	Lithuania	2
Kolding, Denmark (indoor carpet)
Denmark	3
7	Monaco	2
Thessaloniki, Greece (clay)
Greece	1
2	Latvia	4

Second round
Glasgow, Great Britain (indoor hard)
1	Great Britain	4
Luxembourg	1
Gödöllő, Hungary (clay)
3	Belarus	2
Hungary	3
Tuzla, Bosnia and Herz. (indoor hard)
6	Bosnia and Herzegovina	3
Estonia	2
Frederiksberg, Denmark (clay)
Denmark	3
2	Latvia	2

Third round
Glasgow, Great Britain (indoor hard)
1	Great Britain	5
Hungary	0
Hillerød, Denmark (indoor hard)
6	Bosnia and Herzegovina	2
Denmark	3

- Tunisia, Bulgaria, Lithuania, and Greece relegated to Group III in 2012.
- Great Britain and Denmark promoted to Group I in 2012.

=== Group III Europe ===
- Venue: Tennis Club JUG, Skopje, North Macedonia (outdoor clay)
- Date: 11–14 May

Rank	Team
1	Moldova
1	Turkey
3	Montenegro
3	North Macedonia
5	Armenia
5	Norway
7	Andorra
7	Iceland
9	Georgia
9	San Marino
11	Albania
11	Malta

- Moldova and Turkey were promoted to Europe/Africa Zone Group II in 2012.

=== Group III Africa ===
- Venue: Smash Tennis Academy, Cairo, Egypt (outdoor clay)
- Date: 4–9 July

Rank	Team
1	Egypt
1	Madagascar
3	Algeria
3	Zimbabwe
5	Benin
6	Ghana
7	Nigeria
8	Ivory Coast
9	Kenya

- Egypt and Madagascar were promoted to Europe/Africa Zone Group II in 2012.
- Rwanda withdrew from the tournament.
