= Kazakhstan Davis Cup team =

Davis Cup team representing Kazakhstan

Kazakhstan
- Captain: Yuri Schukin
- ITF ranking: 13 ▼ (6 December 2021)
- Colors: Blue & White
- First year: 1995
- Years played: 19
- Ties played (W–L): 60 (37–23)
- Years in World Group: 3 (2–3)
- Best finish: Quarterfinal (2011, 2013, 2014, 2015, 2018, 2021)
- Most total wins: Alexey Kedryuk (66–34)
- Most singles wins: Alexey Kedryuk (43–17)
- Most doubles wins: Alexey Kedryuk (23–17)
- Best doubles team: Igor Chaldounov / Alexey Kedryuk (6–1); Alexey Kedryuk / Anton Tsymbalov (6–2)
- Most ties played: Alexey Kedryuk (51)
- Most years played: Alexey Kedryuk (15)

The Kazakhstan men's national tennis team represents Kazakhstan in Davis Cup tennis competition and are governed by the Kazakhstan Tennis Federation. In 2011, Kazakhstan competed in the World Group for the first time after they won against Switzerland in the 2010 World Group play-offs. After the first round win against the Czech Republic in 2011, Kazakhstan secured their spot in the World Group for the 2012 Davis Cup. They lost in the first round to Spain, but defeated Uzbekistan in the play-offs, which again kept them in the World Group for 2013. In 2013, they defeated Austria in the first round, but lost to the Czech Republic in the quarterfinals.

== History ==
Kazakhstan competed in its first Davis Cup in 1995. Kazakh players previously represented the USSR national tennis team.

In 2010, Kazakhstan competed in the Davis Cup Asia/Oceania Zone, beating South Korea in the 1st round, 5 rubbers to 0, and China in the 2nd round, 4 rubbers to 1, to earn a spot in the World Group playoffs. Kazakhstan then beat Switzerland, 5 rubbers to 0, to earn a spot in the 2011 World Group. Kazakhstan competed in the World Group in at least the following 4 years.

In 2021, Kazakhstan were in the quarterfinals, after winning their Round-robin tournament group stage in Group B.

=== Group B ===
Pos.	Country	Ties	Matches	Sets	Sets %	Games	Games %
1	Kazakhstan	2–0	4–1	8–4	67%	68–52	57%
2	Sweden	1–1	4–2	9–4	69%	66–60	52%
3	Canada	0–2	0–5	1–10	9%	47–69	41%

== Current team (2024) ==
- Alexander Bublik (singles)
- Alexander Shevchenko (singles)
- Denis Yevseyev (singles)
- Aleksandr Nedovyesov (doubles)
- Andrey Golubev (doubles)

== Results ==
1. 2026 Davis Cup: KAZ 1-3 KOR
2. 2026 Davis Cup: KAZ 1-3 MON

== See also ==
- Davis Cup
- Kazakhstan Billie Jean King Cup team
- Kazakhstan at the Hopman Cup
- Kazakhstan Tennis Federation
