= Frederico Ferreira Silva =

Portuguese tennis player (born 1995)

Frederico Silva
- Ferreira Silva at the 2026 Wimbledon Championships
- Full name: Frederico Ferreira Silva
- Country (sports): Portugal
- Residence: Foz do Arelho, Portugal
- Born: 18 March 1995 (age 31) Caldas da Rainha, Portugal
- Height: 1.78 m (5 ft 10 in)
- Turned pro: 2013
- Plays: Left-handed (two-handed backhand)
- Coach: Pedro Felner
- Prize money: US $924,035

Singles
- Career record: 5–9
- Career titles: 0
- Highest ranking: No. 168 (24 May 2021)
- Current ranking: No. 239 (31 August 2026)

Grand Slam singles results
- Australian Open: 1R (2021)
- French Open: Q3 (2020, 2023)
- Wimbledon: Q3 (2021, 2023)
- US Open: Q2 (2026)

Doubles
- Career record: 2–7
- Career titles: 0; 1 Challenger
- Highest ranking: No. 242 (29 August 2016)
- Current ranking: No. 807 (31 August 2026)
- Last updated on: 31 August 2026.

Frederico Ferreira "Kiko" Silva (Portuguese pronunciation: [fɾɨðɨˈɾiku fɨˈʁɐjɾɐ ˈkiku ˈsilvɐ]; born 18 March 1995) is a Portuguese tennis player who currently competes mainly on the ATP Challenger Tour. On 24 May 2021, Silva reached a career singles high ranking of No. 168. He also reached a career-high of No. 242 in doubles in August 2016.

In 2012, Silva became the first Portuguese player to win a Grand Slam title with the win at the US Open junior doubles tournament, teaming with Brit Kyle Edmund. In 2013, he would repeat the feat at the French Open junior doubles with Edmund. He reached a junior high world no. 6 in January 2012.

== Juniors ==
Silva began his junior career in 2009. In May 2010, he won his first singles and doubles titles in a Grade 4 tournament at Istanbul, Turkey. Silva made his debut at Junior Grand Slams at the 2011 Wimbledon Championships, reaching the 3rd round. Silva was also the runner-up in the 2012 European Junior Championship (U18 division).

== Professional career ==
In 2010, Silva made his ITF Men's Circuit debut at the age of 14, at the Albufeira F3 doubles competition, and reached the final. He made his Grand Slam debut at the 2021 Australian Open after qualifying for the main draw.

In November 2022, he reached two back-to-back finals in Japan at the Hyogo Noah Challenger in Kobe and in Yokkaichi losing to Yosuke Watanuki in both and moved more than 85 positions up into the top 225 at world No. 204 on 28 November 2022.

== Anti-doping suspension ==
In September 2025, it was announced that Silva had accepted a one month suspension after failing an in-competition doping test. The International Tennis Integrity Agency said the offence took place in February 2025 and it had accepted his explanation that the banned substance involved, trimetazidine, had entered his system as the result of contamination from the use of a prescribed medicine.

== ATP Challenger Tour finals ==
=== Singles: 5 (1 title, 4 runner-ups) ===
Legend ATP Challenger Tour (1–4)	Finals by surface Hard (1–2) Clay (0–2) Grass (0–0) Carpet (0–0)

Result	W–L	Date	Tournament	Tier	Surface	Opponent	Score
Loss	0–1	Nov 2020	São Paulo, Brazil	Challenger	Clay	(Brazil) Felipe Meligeni Alves	2–6, 6–7^{(3–7)}
Loss	0–2	Nov 2022	Kobe, Japan	Challenger	Hard (i)	(Japan) Yosuke Watanuki	7–6^{(7–3)}, 5–7, 4–6
Loss	0–3	Nov 2022	Yokkaichi, Japan	Challenger	Hard	(Japan) Yosuke Watanuki	2–6, 2–6
Loss	0–4	Jun 2023	Troisdorf, Germany	Challenger	Clay	Ivan Gakhov	2–6, 7–5, 3–6
Win	1–4	Feb 2026	Chennai, India	Challenger	Hard	(Argentina) Federico Agustín Gómez	6–4, 6–7^{(10–12)}, 6–4

=== Doubles: 1 (1 title) ===
Legend ATP Challenger Tour (1–0)

Result	W–L	Date	Tournament	Tier	Surface	Partner	Opponents	Score
Win	1–0	Sep 2015	Porto Alegre, Brazil	Challenger	Clay	(Portugal) Gastão Elias	(Chile) Cristian Garín (Chile) Juan Carlos Sáez	6–2, 6–4

== ITF Futures/World Tennis Tour finals ==
=== Singles: 37 (20 titles, 17 runner-ups) ===
Legend ITF Futures/WTT (20–17)	Finals by surface Hard (15–12) Clay (4–5) Grass (0–0) Carpet (1–0)

Result	W–L	Date	Tournament	Tier	Surface	Opponent	Score
Win	1–0	May 2013	Portugal F6, Monfortinho	Futures	Carpet	(Spain) Iván Arenas-Gualda	6–4, 7–6^{(7–5)}
Loss	1–1	Dec 2013	Spain F41, Puerto del Carmen	Futures	Hard	(Russia) Alexey Vatutin	4–6, 4–6
Loss	1–2	Mar 2014	Turkey F9, Antalya	Futures	Hard	(Brazil) Wilson Leite	5–7, 2–6
Win	2–2	May 2014	Portugal F5, Pombal	Futures	Hard	(Portugal) João Domingues	6–0, 6–3
Loss	2–3	Jun 2014	Belgium F2, Binche	Futures	Hard	(United Kingdom) Alexander Ward	6–2, 3–6, 6–7^{(7–9)}
Loss	2–4	Aug 2014	Spain F21, Béjar	Futures	Clay	(United Kingdom) Brydan Klein	3–6, 3–6
Loss	2–5	Aug 2014	Romania F13, Brașov	Futures	Clay	(Serbia) Nikola Ćaćić	4–6, 6–4, 5–7
Loss	2–6	Oct 2014	Portugal F9, Porto	Futures	Clay	(Portugal) Frederico Gil	7–6^{(7–5)}, 3–6, 0–6
Win	3–6	Oct 2014	Portugal F10, Ponta Delgada	Futures	Hard	(Republic of Ireland) Sam Barry	6–4, 6–3
Loss	3–7	Oct 2014	Portugal F11, Ponta Delgada	Futures	Hard	(Portugal) Rui Machado	2–6, 3–6
Loss	3–8	Dec 2014	Turkey F43, Antalya	Futures	Hard	(Russia) Roman Safiullin	1–6, 2–1 ret.
Win	4–8	May 2015	Portugal F7, Idanha-a-Nova	Futures	Hard	(Portugal) João Domingues	6–4, 6–2
Win	5–8	Nov 2015	Egypt F37, Sharm El Sheikh	Futures	Hard	(Serbia) Marko Tepavac	7–5, 6–3
Loss	5–9	Nov 2015	Egypt F38, Sharm El Sheikh	Futures	Hard	(Serbia) Marko Tepavac	6–7^{(5–7)}, 1–6
Win	6–9	Nov 2015	Egypt F39, Sharm El Sheikh	Futures	Hard	(Serbia) Marko Tepavac	6–1, 6–2
Loss	6–10	Feb 2016	Turkey F6, Antalya	Futures	Hard	(South Korea) Hong Seong-chan	5–7, 4–6
Win	7–10	Mar 2016	Portugal F3, Loulé	Futures	Hard	(Portugal) Rui Machado	1–6, 6–3, 6–1
Win	8–10	Dec 2016	Turkey F48, Antalya	Futures	Hard	(Italy) Lorenzo Frigerio	6–2, 6–3
Win	9–10	May 2017	Ukraine F1, Cherkassy	Futures	Clay	(Ukraine) Artem Smirnov	6-1, 6-2
Win	10–10	Jun 2017	Tunisia F22, Hammamet	Futures	Clay	(Brazil) Fabiano de Paula	6-4, 6-4
Loss	10–11	Jul 2017	Portugal F10, Torres Vedras	Futures	Hard	(Spain) Roberto Ortega Olmedo	3-6, 2-6
Loss	10–12	Jul 2017	Portugal F11, Póvoa de Varzim	Futures	Hard	(Australia) Alex de Minaur	1–6, 6–2, 4–6
Loss	10–13	Sep 2017	Tunisia F27, Hammamet	Futures	Clay	(Italy) Filippo Baldi	0-6, 4-6
Win	11–13	Feb 2018	Portugal F1, Vale do Lobo	Futures	Hard	(Portugal) Tiago Cação	6–2, 6–7^{(3–7)}, 7–5
Win	12–13	Mar 2018	Portugal F3, Loulé	Futures	Hard	(Spain) David Vega Hernández	5–7, 6–1, 3–1 ret.
Loss	12–14	Apr 2018	Portugal F6, Lisbon	Futures	Hard	(South Africa) Lloyd Harris	6–7^{(2–7)}, 6–7^{(3–7)}
Win	13–14	Apr 2018	Portugal F8, Cascais	Futures	Clay	(Portugal) Tiago Cação	6–2, 3–6, 6–3
Win	14–14	Jun 2018	Tunisia F23, Hammamet	Futures	Clay	(Spain) Oriol Roca Batalla	7–6^{(7–5)}, 6–7^{(7–9)}, 7–5
Win	15–14	Aug 2018	Portugal F14, Sintra	Futures	Hard	(Portugal) Tiago Cação	6-3, 6-1
Loss	15–15	Aug 2018	Portugal F15, Sintra	Futures	Hard	(Egypt) Youssef Hossam	6–4, 6–7^{(5–7)}, 5–7
Win	16–15	Oct 2019	M25 Tavira, Portugal	WTT	Hard	(France) Alexandre Müller	6-2, 6-1
Win	17–15	Jul 2024	M25 Castelo Branco, Portugal	WTT	Hard	(Belgium) Michael Geerts	3–6, 6–4, 6–2
Loss	17–16	Sep 2024	M25 Satu Mare, Romania	WTT	Clay	(Romania) Filip Cristian Jianu	4–6, 3–6
Win	18–16	Oct 2024	M25 Sintra, Portugal	WTT	Hard	(Belgium) Gauthier Onclin	7–5, 6–4
Win	19–16	Nov 2024	M25 Vale do Lobo, Portugal	WTT	Hard	(Portugal) Pedro Araujo	6–4, 6–2
Loss	19–17	Nov 2024	M25 Vale do Lobo, Portugal	WTT	Hard	(Belgium) Gauthier Onclin	5–7, 1–6
Win	20–17	Feb 2025	M25 Vila Real de Santo António, Portugal	WTT	Hard	(Austria) Sandro Kopp	5–7, 6–1, 7–6^{(14–12)}

=== Doubles: 23 (12 titles, 11 runner-ups) ===
Legend ITF Futures (12–11)	Finals by surface Hard (3–6) Clay (9–4) Grass (0–0) Carpet (0–1)

Result	W–L	Date	Tournament	Tier	Surface	Partner	Opponents	Score
Loss	0–1	May 2010	Portugal F3, Albufeira	Futures	Hard	(Portugal) Diogo Soares	(Brazil) Diego Matos (Brazil) André Miele	1–6, 4–6
Win	1–1	Aug 2013	Spain F26, Vigo	Futures	Clay	(Spain) David Pérez Sanz	(Spain) Juan-Samuel Araúzo-Martínez (Germany) Jean-Marc Werner	6–2, 7–6^{(7–3)}
Win	2–1	Oct 2013	Portugal F10, Guimarães	Futures	Hard	(Portugal) João Domingues	(Portugal) Gonçalo Falcão (Portugal) Gonçalo Pereira	7–6^{(7–5)}, 1–6, [10–8]
Win	3–1	Nov 2013	Egypt F32, Sharm El Sheikh	Futures	Clay	(Belgium) Romain Barbosa	(Russia) Yan Sabanin (Moldova) Andrei Șoltoianu	6–3, 6–3
Win	4–1	Nov 2013	Egypt F33, Sharm El Sheikh	Futures	Clay	(Belgium) Romain Barbosa	(Russia) Maxim Kravtsov (Russia) Ivan Nedelko	4–6, 6–1, [10–5]
Win	5–1	Feb 2014	Portugal F3, Faro	Futures	Hard	(Portugal) Frederico Gil	(Spain) Juan-Samuel Araúzo-Martínez (Spain) Jaime Pulgar-García	6–1, 6–4
Win	6–1	Mar 2014	Turkey F7, Antalya	Futures	Clay	(Portugal) Romain Barbosa	(Germany) Peter Heller (Austria) Maxi Pongratz	2–6, 6–4, [10–6]
Loss	6–2	Mar 2014	Turkey F8, Antalya	Futures	Clay	(Portugal) Romain Barbosa	(Czech Republic) Roman Jebavý (Czech Republic) Jan Šátral	2–6, 2–6
Loss	6–3	May 2014	Portugal F4, Monfortinho	Futures	Carpet	(Portugal) Romain Barbosa	(Australia) Jordan Kerr (France) Fabrice Martin	2–6, 7–6^{(7–3)}, [4–10]
Loss	6–4	May 2014	Portugal F6, Caldas da Rainha	Futures	Clay	(Portugal) Romain Barbosa	(Portugal) Gonçalo Falcão (Portugal) Gonçalo Pereira	6–4, 3–6, [5–10]
Win	7–4	Jun 2014	Belgium F2, Binche	Futures	Clay	(Portugal) Romain Barbosa	(Germany) Oscar Otte (Germany) Peter Torebko	6–2, 7–6^{(7–4)}
Loss	7–5	Oct 2014	Portugal F8, Oliveira de Azeméis	Futures	Hard	(Portugal) Romain Barbosa	(Portugal) Frederico Gil (Portugal) Leonardo Tavares	1–6, 6–3, [4–10]
Loss	7–6	Oct 2014	Portugal F9, Porto	Futures	Clay	(Portugal) Romain Barbosa	(Portugal) Frederico Gil (Portugal) Leonardo Tavares	6–2, 3–6, [6–10]
Loss	7–7	Oct 2014	Portugal F10, Ponta Delgada	Futures	Hard	(Portugal) Romain Barbosa	(Portugal) Gonçalo Falcão (Portugal) Frederico Gil	4–6, 2–6
Loss	7–8	Dec 2014	Turkey F43, Antalya	Futures	Hard	(Portugal) Romain Barbosa	(Latvia) Mārtiņš Podžus (Latvia) Jānis Podžus	6–4, 3–6, [7–10]
Win	8–8	May 2015	Portugal F4, Caldas da Rainha	Futures	Clay	(Portugal) Frederico Gil	(Portugal) João Domingues (Spain) David Vega Hernández	6–3, 6–2
Win	9–8	Sep 2015	Belgium F13, Arlon	Futures	Clay	(Portugal) Romain Barbosa	(Germany) Vincent Jaensch-Mueller (Argentina) Pedro Munafo	6–2, 6–1
Win	10–8	Oct 2015	Egypt F36, Sharm El Sheikh	Futures	Clay	(Portugal) André Gaspar Murta	(United Kingdom) Luke Bambridge (United Kingdom) Richard Gabb	7–6^{(7–4)}, 6–3
Loss	10–9	Feb 2016	Turkey F6, Antalya	Futures	Hard	(Ukraine) Vadim Alekseenko	(Slovakia) Lukáš Klein (Slovakia) Alex Molčan	6–7^{(7–9)}, 6–7^{(5–7)}
Win	11–9	Mar 2016	Egypt F9, Sharm El Sheikh	Futures	Hard	(Spain) Pablo Vivero González	(Belgium) Michael Geerts (Belgium) Jonas Merckx	3–6, 6–1, [10–6]
Loss	11–10	Mar 2016	Egypt F10, Sharm El Sheikh	Futures	Hard	(Germany) Tom Schonenberg	(Czech Republic) Tomáš Papik (Czech Republic) Matěj Vocel	6–3, 4–6, [4–10]
Loss	11–11	Apr 2017	Portugal F7, Carcavelos	Futures	Clay	(Spain) David Vega Hernández	(Portugal) Felipe Cunha e Silva (Portugal) Fred Gil	6–4, 3–6, [7–10]
Win	12–11	May 2017	Romania F2, Bacău	Futures	Clay	(Spain) David Vega Hernández	(Romania) Vasile Antonescu (Romania) Patrick Grigoriu	7–5, 6–3

== ITF Junior Circuit ==
=== Singles: 8 (2 titles, 6 runner-ups) ===
Legend Category Grade A (0–1) Category Grade 1 (0–0) Category Grade 2 (0–1) Category Grade 3 (1–1) Category Grade 4 (1–2) Category Grade 5 (0–0) Category Grade B (0–1)	Finals by surface Hard (1–2) Clay (0–3) Grass (0–0) Carpet (1–1)	Finals by setting Outdoors (2–6) Indoors (0–0)

Result	Date	Category	Tournament	Surface	Opponent	Score
Win	15 May 2010	Grade 4	Enka ITF Junior, Turkey	Hard	(France) Enzo Py	6–0, 6–4
Loss	23 May 2010	Grade 4	Nazmi Bari Cup ITF Junior, Turkey	Hard	(Georgia (country)) Aleksandre Metreveli	5–7, 6–2, 4–6
Loss	7 August 2010	Grade 4	16th Internacional Junior de Leiria, Portugal	Clay	(France) Enzo Couacaud	3–6, 4–6
Loss	22 August 2010	Grade 3	Vila do Conde Junior Tennis Cup, Portugal	Carpet	(United Kingdom) Robert Carter	3–6, 4–6
Win	21 August 2011	Grade 3	Vila do Conde Junior Tennis Cup, Portugal	Carpet	(Russia) Konstantin Gerlakh	6–3, 6–4
Loss	1 January 2012	Grade A	Abierto Juvenil Mexicano, Mexico	Clay	(Italy) Stefano Napolitano	4–6, 4–6
Loss	22 April 2012	Grade 2	X Internacional Junior Pilar de la Horadada, Spain	Hard	(Italy) Stefano Napolitano	4–6, 4–6
Loss	29 July 2012	Grade B1	2012 European Junior Championships, Switzerland	Clay	(Belgium) Kimmer Coppejans	2–6, 3–6

=== Doubles: 14 (9 titles, 5 runner-ups) ===
Legend Category Grade A (4–1) Category Grade 1 (1–2) Category Grade 2 (0–2) Category Grade 3 (2–0) Category Grade 4 (2–0) Category Grade 5 (0–0) Category Grade B (0–0)	Finals by surface Hard (3–2) Clay (4–2) Grass (1–1) Carpet (1–0)	Finals by setting Outdoors (9–5) Indoors (0–0)

Result	Date	Category	Tournament	Surface	Partner	Opponents	Score
Win	14 May 2010	Grade 4	Enka ITF Junior, Turkey	Hard	(Portugal) Diogo Rocha	(France) Julien Delaplane (France) Florian Lakat	6–4, 6–3
Win	6 August 2010	Grade 4	16th Internacional Junior de Leiria, Portugal	Clay	(Portugal) Vasco Mensurado	(Portugal) João Monteiro (Portugal) João Domingues	6–2, 7–5
Loss	22 January 2011	Grade 1	Copa Barranquilla, Colombia	Clay	(Spain) David Biosca Girvent	(Bolivia) Hugo Dellien (Ecuador) Diego Hidalgo	3–6, 7–6^{(11–9)}, [5–10]
Win	20 August 2011	Grade 3	Vila do Conde Junior Tennis Cup, Portugal	Carpet	(Portugal) Artur Completo	(Spain) Carlos Benito Hergueta (Spain) Adam Sanjurjo Hermida	6–4, 6–7^{(5–7)}, [10–7]
Win	15 September 2011	Grade 3	U18 Canadian World Ranking Event, Canada	Hard	(South Africa) Wayne Montgomery	(Canada) Hugo Di Feo (Canada) Brayden Schnur	6–2, 6–2
Win	31 December 2011	Grade A	Abierto Juvenil Mexicano, Mexico	Clay	(United States) Connor Farren	(Italy) Matteo Donati (Italy) Stefano Napolitano	4–6, 6–4, [10–4]
Loss	13 April 2012	Grade 2	VI ITF Junior Benicarló, Spain	Clay	(Belgium) Jeroen Vanneste	(Spain) Eduard Esteve Lobato (Spain) Pol Toledo Bagué	2–6, 6–3, [6–10]
Loss	21 April 2012	Grade 2	X Internacional Junior Pilar de la Horadada, Spain	Hard	(Italy) Stefano Napolitano	(Spain) Eduard Esteve Lobato (Spain) Pol Toledo Bagué	4–6, 6–7^{(6–8)}
Loss	28 June 2012	Grade 1	AEGON Junior International Roehampton, Great Britain	Grass	(Russia) Evgeny Karlovskiy	(Australia) Luke Saville (Australia) Jordan Thompson	1–6, 6–4, [6–10]
Win	8 September 2012	Grade A	US Open Junior Tennis Championships, United States	Hard	(United Kingdom) Kyle Edmund	(Australia) Nick Kyrgios (Australia) Jordan Thompson	5–7, 6–4, [10–7]
Win	28 December 2012	Grade A	Abierto Juvenil Mexicano, Mexico (2)	Clay	(Serbia) Nikola Milojević	(Croatia) Franko Miocić (Chile) Guillermo Núñez	7–5, 6–3
Win	7 June 2013	Grade A	Roland Garros Junior French Championships, France	Clay	(United Kingdom) Kyle Edmund	(Chile) Cristian Garín (Chile) Nicolás Jarry	6–3, 6–3
Win	27 June 2013	Grade 1	AEGON Junior International Roehampton, Great Britain	Grass	(Chile) Nicolás Jarry	(Argentina) Pedro Cachín (Chile) Guillermo Núñez	7–6^{(7–3)}, 6–7^{(1–7)}, [10–5]
Loss	8 September 2013	Grade A	US Open Junior Tennis Championships, United States	Hard	(France) Quentin Halys	(Poland) Kamil Majchrzak (United States) Martin Redlicki	3–6, 4–6

== Junior Grand Slam finals ==
=== Doubles: 3 (2 titles, 1 runner-up) ===
Result	Year	Tournament	Surface	Partner	Opponents	Score
Win	2012	US Open	Hard	(United Kingdom) Kyle Edmund	(Australia) Nick Kyrgios (Australia) Jordan Thompson	5–7, 6–4, [10–7]
Win	2013	French Open	Clay	(United Kingdom) Kyle Edmund	(Chile) Cristian Garín (Chile) Nicolás Jarry	6–3, 6–3
Loss	2013	US Open	Hard	(France) Quentin Halys	(Poland) Kamil Majchrzak (United States) Martin Redlicki	3–6, 4–6

== Performance timelines ==
Key
W	F	SF	QF	#R	RR	Q#	P#	DNQ	A	Z#	PO	G	S	B	NMS	NTI	P	NH

(W) winner; (F) finalist; (SF) semifinalist; (QF) quarterfinalist; (#R) rounds 4, 3, 2, 1; (RR) round-robin stage; (Q#) qualification round; (P#) preliminary round; (DNQ) did not qualify; (A) absent; (Z#) Davis/Fed Cup Zonal Group (with number indication) or (PO) play-off; (G) gold, (S) silver or (B) bronze Olympic/Paralympic medal; (NMS) not a Masters tournament; (NTI) not a Tier I tournament; (P) postponed; (NH) not held; (SR) strike rate (events won / competed); (W–L) win–loss record.
To avoid confusion and double counting, these charts are updated at the conclusion of a tournament or when the player's participation has ended.

=== Singles ===
Current through the 2022 Australian Open.

Tournament	2013	2014	2015	2016	2017	2018	2019	2020	2021	2022	SR	W–L	Win %
Grand Slam tournaments
Australian Open	A	A	A	A	A	A	A	Q2	1R	Q2	0 / 1	0–1	–
French Open	A	A	A	A	A	A	A	Q3	Q1	A	0 / 0	0–0	–
Wimbledon	A	A	A	Q2	A	A	A	NH	Q3	Q1	0 / 0	0–0	–
US Open	A	A	A	A	A	A	A	A	Q1	A	0 / 0	0–0	–
Win–loss	0–0	0–0	0–0	0–0	0–0	0–0	0–0	0–0	0–1	0–0	0 / 1	0–1	–
Tournaments	0	0	1	1	1	1	0	0	2	0	6		
Titles–Finals	0–0	0–0	0–0	0–0	0–0	0–0	0–0	0–0	0–0	0–0	0–0		
Overall win–loss	0–0	1–1	1–2	0–1	2–1	0–1	0–0	1–0	0–2	0–0	0 / 6	5–8	38%
Year-end ranking	603	297	298	316	355	324	202	183	240	244	$503,275		

=== Doubles ===
Tournament	2013	2014	2015	2016	2017	2018	2019	2020	2021	2022	SR	W–L	Win %
Grand Slam tournaments
Australian Open	Absent										0 / 0	0–0	N/A
French Open	Absent										0 / 0	0–0	N/A
Wimbledon	Absent										0 / 0	0–0	N/A
US Open	Absent										0 / 0	0–0	N/A
Win–loss	0–0	0–0	0–0	0–0	0–0	0–0	0–0	0–0	0–0	0–0	0 / 0	0–0	N/A
National representation
Summer Olympics	Not Held			A	Not Held				A		0 / 0	0–0	N/A
Davis Cup	A	Z1	Z2	A	Z1	A	A	A	A		0 / 3	1–0	100%
Career statistics
	2013	2014	2015	2016	2017	2018	2019	2020	2021	2022	SR	W–L	Win %
Tournaments	1	1	1	1	1	0	0	0	1	0	6		
Overall win–loss	0–1	0–1	1–1	1–1	0–1	0–0	0–0	0–0	0–1	0–0	0 / 6	2–6	25%
Year-end ranking	578	409	390	387	599	–	–	825	493	813	$30,723		

== Head-to-head vs. Top 20 players ==
This section contains Silva's win–loss record against players who have been ranked 20th or higher in the world rankings during their careers.

Opponent	Highest rank	Matches	Won	Lost	Win %	Last match	Ref
(Spain) Nicolás Almagro	9	1	0	1	0%	Lost (3–6, 2–6) at the 2016 Estoril Open	
Total		1	0	1	0.00%	Statistics correct as of 10 April 2017	

== Career earnings ==
Year	Major titles	ATP titles	Total titles	Earnings	Ref
2013	0	0	0	$9,619	
2014	0	0	0	$19,183	
2015	0	0	0	$29,445	
2016	0	0	0	$39,595	
2017	0	0	0	* $3,022	
Career *	0	0	0	$102,733	

* As of 10 April 2017.

== National participation ==
=== Davis Cup (4 wins, 2 losses) ===
Silva has played for the Portugal Davis Cup team since 2014 and has played 6 matches in 5 ties. His singles record is 3–2 and his doubles record is 1–0 (4–2 overall).

Group membership World Group (0–0) WG Play-off (0–0) Group I (2–1) Group II (2–1) Group III (0–0) Group IV (0–0)	Matches by surface Hard (2–2) Clay (2–0) Grass (0–0) Carpet (0–0)	Matches by Type Singles (3–2) Doubles (1–0)	Matches by Setting Indoors (3–2) Outdoors (1–0)	Matches by Venue Portugal (3–1) Away (1–1)

- ▲ ▼ indicates the result of the Davis Cup match followed by the score, date, place of event, the zonal classification and its phase, and the court surface.

Rubber result	Rubber	Match type (partner if any)	Opponent nation	Opponent player(s)	Score
▼2–3; 31 January – 2 February 2014; Teniski klub Triglav Kranj, Kranj, Slovenia; Group I Europe/Africa first round; Hard(i) surface
Victory	V	Singles (dead rubber)	Slovenia	Mike Urbanija	4–6, 4–3, ret
▼1–4; 12–14 September 2014; Olympic Stadium, Moscow, Russia; Group I Europe/Africa Relegation Play-off; Hard(i) surface
Defeat	V	Singles (dead rubber)	Russia	Andrey Rublev	4–6, 4–6
▲4–1; 6–8 March 2015; Centro Desportivo do Jamor, Cruz Quebrada, Portugal; Group II Europe/Africa first round; Hard(i) surface
Victory	III	Doubles (with João Sousa)	Morocco	Lamine Ouahab / Younès Rachidi	7–6^{(8–6)}, 6–0, 6–1
Defeat	IV	Singles (dead rubber)	Morocco	Lamine Ouahab	6–7^{(5–7)}, 4–6
▲4–1; 17–19 July 2015; Clube de Ténis de Viana, Viana do Castelo, Portugal; Group II Europe/Africa Quarterfinal; Clay surface
Victory	V	Singles (dead rubber)	Finland	Micke Kontinen	3–6, 6–1, 6–0
▲5–0; 3–5 February 2017; Club Internacional de Foot-ball, Lisbon, Portugal; Group I Europe/Africa first round; Clay(i) surface
Victory	IV	Singles (dead rubber)	Israel	Daniel Cukierman	6–2, 6–0
