= 2015 Davis Cup Europe/Africa Zone Group II =

International tennis competition

The Europe and Africa Zone is one of the three zones of regional Davis Cup competition in 2015.

== Participating teams ==
Seeds:

1. South Africa
2. Latvia
3. Portugal
4. Moldova
5. Bosnia and Herzegovina
6. Finland
7. Belarus
8. Luxembourg

Remaining nations:

- Bulgaria
- Hungary
- Ireland
- Madagascar
- Monaco
- Morocco
- Turkey
- Zimbabwe

=== Draw ===
Play-offs
Centurion, South Africa (hard)
1	South Africa	5
Ireland	0
Roquebrune-Cap-Martin, France (clay)
Morocco	1
Monaco	3
Harare, Zimbabwe (hard)
Zimbabwe	5
4	Moldova	0
Liepāja, Latvia (clay)
Madagascar	2
2	Latvia	3

First Round
Mersin, Turkey (indoor hard)
1	South Africa	2
Turkey	3
Dublin, Ireland (indoor hard)
7	Belarus	5
Ireland	0
Cruz Quebrada, Portugal (indoor hard)
3	Portugal	4
Morocco	1
Roquebrune-Cap-Martin, France (clay)
6	Finland	3
Monaco	2
Harare, Zimbabwe (hard)
Zimbabwe	1
5	Bosnia and Herzegovina	4
Győr, Hungary (indoor hard)
Hungary	4
4	Moldova	1
Esch-sur-Alzette, Lux. (indoor hard)
Madagascar	2
8	Luxembourg	3
Jūrmala, Latvia (indoor hard)
Bulgaria	4
2	Latvia	1

Second Round
Istanbul, Turkey (hard)
Turkey	2
7	Belarus	3
Viana do Castelo, Portugal (clay)
3	Portugal	4
6	Finland	1
Siófok, Hungary (clay)
5	Bosnia and Herzegovina	2
Hungary	3
Luxembourg City, Luxembourg (clay)
8	Luxembourg	0
Bulgaria	5

Third Round
Viana do Castelo, Portugal (clay)
7	Belarus	2
3	Portugal	3
Sofia, Bulgaria (clay)
Hungary	3
Bulgaria	2

- Ireland, Morocco, Moldova, and Madagascar relegated to Group III in 2016.
- Portugal and Hungary promoted to Group I in 2016.

== First round ==
=== Turkey vs. South Africa ===
Turkey
3
Mersin Tenis Kompleksi, Mersin, Turkey
6–8 March 2015
Hard (i)

South Africa
2

			1	2	3	4	5
1	(Turkey) (South Africa)	Cem İlkel; Fritz Wolmarans	1; 6	4; 6	7^{7} 6^{5}	1; 6
2	(Turkey) (South Africa)	Marsel İlhan; Tucker Vorster	6; 4	6; 3	7; 5
3	(Turkey) (South Africa)	Marsel İlhan / Cem İlkel; Raven Klaasen / Ruan Roelofse	3; 6	2; 6	7^{7} 6^{5}	6; 4	3; 6
4	(Turkey) (South Africa)	Marsel İlhan; Fritz Wolmarans	6; 2	6; 4	6^{5} 7^{7}	4; 6	8; 6
5	(Turkey) (South Africa)	Cem İlkel; Ruan Roelofse	7^{13} 6^{11}	6^{4} 7^{7}	5; 7	7^{7} 6^{5}	6; 4

=== Ireland vs. Belarus ===
Ireland
0
Castleknock Tennis Club, Dublin, Ireland
6–8 March 2015
Hard (i)

Belarus
5

			1	2	3	4	5
1	(Republic of Ireland) (Belarus)	Sam Barry; Dzmitry Zhyrmont	4; 6	7^{7} 6^{3}	6^{4} 7^{7}	2; 6
2	(Republic of Ireland) (Belarus)	Daniel Glancy; Egor Gerasimov	2; 6	3; 6	3; 6
3	(Republic of Ireland) (Belarus)	James Cluskey / David O'Hare; Sergey Betov / Aliaksandr Bury	6^{7} 7^{9}	7; 5	3; 6	4; 6
4	(Republic of Ireland) (Belarus)	Sam Barry; Egor Gerasimov	6^{6} 7^{8}	2; 6
5	(Republic of Ireland) (Belarus)	Daniel Glancy; Dzmitry Zhyrmont	2; 6	0; 6

=== Portugal vs. Morocco ===
Portugal
4
Centro Desportivo do Jamor, Cruz Quebrada, Portugal
6–8 March 2015
Hard (i)

Morocco
1

			1	2	3	4	5
1	(Portugal) (Morocco)	João Sousa; Yassine Idmbarek	6; 0	6; 0	6; 2
2	(Portugal) (Morocco)	Rui Machado; Lamine Ouahab	6; 2	6; 4	6; 4
3	(Portugal) (Morocco)	Frederico Ferreira Silva / João Sousa; Lamine Ouahab / Younès Rachidi	7^{8} 6^{6}	6; 0	6; 1
4	(Portugal) (Morocco)	Frederico Ferreira Silva; Lamine Ouahab	6^{5} 7^{7}	4; 6
5	(Portugal) (Morocco)	João Domingues; Mehdi Jdi	6; 2	7; 5

=== Monaco vs. Finland ===
Monaco
2
Monte Carlo Country Club, Roquebrune-Cap-Martin, Monaco
6–8 March 2015
Clay

Finland
3

			1	2	3	4	5
1	(Monaco) (Finland)	Romain Arneodo; Jarkko Nieminen	1; 6	4; 6	3; 6
2	(Monaco) (Finland)	Benjamin Balleret; Micke Kontinen	6; 2	2; 6	6; 2	6; 4
3	(Monaco) (Finland)	Romain Arneodo / Benjamin Balleret; Henri Kontinen / Jarkko Nieminen	6^{2} 7^{7}	7^{7} 6^{4}	7^{7} 6^{1}	4; 6	5; 7
4	(Monaco) (Finland)	Benjamin Balleret; Jarkko Nieminen	1; 6	2; 6	6^{4} 7^{7}
5	(Monaco) (Finland)	Romain Arneodo; Henrik Sillanpää	1; 6	6; 4	6; 2

=== Zimbabwe vs. Bosnia and Herzegovina ===
Zimbabwe
1
Harare Sports Club, Harare, Zimbabwe
6–8 March 2015
Hard

Bosnia and Herzegovina
4

			1	2	3	4	5
1	(Zimbabwe) (Bosnia and Herzegovina)	Takanyi Garanganga; Mirza Bašić	3; 6	3; 6	6^{6} 7^{8}
2	(Zimbabwe) (Bosnia and Herzegovina)	Benjamin Lock; Damir Džumhur	3; 6	6^{1} 7^{7}	3; 6
3	(Zimbabwe) (Bosnia and Herzegovina)	Wayne Black / Mark Fynn; Mirza Bašić / Tomislav Brkić	3; 6	6; 3	3; 6	4; 6
4	(Zimbabwe) (Bosnia and Herzegovina)	Takanyi Garanganga; Tomislav Brkić	7^{7} 6^{4}	6^{4} 7^{7}	5; 7
5	(Zimbabwe) (Bosnia and Herzegovina)	Benjamin Lock; Nerman Fatić	6; 3					retired

=== Hungary vs. Moldova ===
Hungary
4
Győr Városi Egyetemi Csarnok, Győr, Hungary
6–8 March 2015
Hard (i)

Moldova
1

			1	2	3	4	5
1	(Hungary) (Moldova)	Gábor Borsos; Radu Albot	3; 6	2; 6	5; 7
2	(Hungary) (Moldova)	Márton Fucsovics; Andrei Ciumac	6; 0	6; 2	6; 3
3	(Hungary) (Moldova)	Márton Fucsovics / Levente Gödry; Radu Albot / Andrei Ciumac	7^{7} 6^{4}	3; 6	4; 6	7^{8} 6^{6}	8; 6
4	(Hungary) (Moldova)	Márton Fucsovics; Radu Albot	6; 2	6; 1	6; 2
5	(Hungary) (Moldova)	Gábor Borsos; Maxim Bulat	6; 0	6; 3

=== Luxembourg vs. Madagascar ===
Luxembourg
3
Centre National de Tennis, Esch-sur-Alzette, Luxembourg
6–8 March 2015
Hard (i)

Madagascar
2

			1	2	3	4	5
1	(Luxembourg) (Madagascar)	Gilles Müller; Jacob Rasolondrazana	6; 0	6; 3	6; 2
2	(Luxembourg) (Madagascar)	Ugo Nastasi; Antso Rakotondramanga	7^{7} 6^{2}	4; 6	2; 6	1; 1		retired
3	(Luxembourg) (Madagascar)	Gilles Müller / Mike Scheidweiler; Tony Rajaobelina / Antso Rakotondramanga	6; 4	6^{4} 7^{7}	6; 4	6; 2
4	(Luxembourg) (Madagascar)	Gilles Müller; Antso Rakotondramanga	7^{7} 6^{4}	6; 2	6; 2
5	(Luxembourg) (Madagascar)	Gilles Kremer; Lofo Ramiaramanana	4; 6	6; 3	3; 6

=== Latvia vs. Bulgaria ===
Latvia
1
Tenisa Centrs Lielupe, Jūrmala, Latvia
6–8 March 2015
Hard (i)

Bulgaria
4

			1	2	3	4	5
1	(Latvia) (Bulgaria)	Mārtiņš Podžus; Alexandar Lazov	6; 3	7; 5	7; 5
2	(Latvia) (Bulgaria)	Jānis Podžus; Dimitar Kuzmanov	4; 6	6; 3	3; 6	6; 1	10; 12
3	(Latvia) (Bulgaria)	Jānis Podžus / Mārtiņš Podžus; Tihomir Grozdanov / Ilia Kushev	6; 3	6; 2	4; 6	5; 7	1; 6
4	(Latvia) (Bulgaria)	Mārtiņš Podžus; Dimitar Kuzmanov	6^{6} 7^{8}	7; 5	2; 6	4; 6
5	(Latvia) (Bulgaria)	Rūdolfs Mednis; Alexandar Lazov	4; 6	1; 6

== Second round ==
=== Turkey vs. Belarus ===
Turkey
2
Garanti Koza Wos Arena, Istanbul, Turkey
17–19 July 2015
Hard

Belarus
3

			1	2	3	4	5
1	(Turkey) (Belarus)	Marsel İlhan; Egor Gerasimov	6^{8} 7^{10}	4; 6	6; 3	6; 2	9; 7
2	(Turkey) (Belarus)	Cem İlkel; Dzmitry Zhyrmont	3; 6	2; 6	6; 2	5; 7
3	(Turkey) (Belarus)	Baris Erguden / Anil Yuksel; Sergey Betov / Max Mirnyi	2; 6	1; 6	4; 6
4	(Turkey) (Belarus)	Marsel İlhan; Dzmitry Zhyrmont	6^{6} 7^{8}	6; 3	6; 3	6; 2
5	(Turkey) (Belarus)	Cem İlkel; Egor Gerasimov	2; 6	6^{5} 7^{7}	6; 3	6^{5} 7^{7}

=== Portugal vs. Finland ===
Portugal
4
Clube de Ténis de Viana, Viana do Castelo, Portugal
17–19 July 2015
Clay

Finland
1

			1	2	3	4	5
1	(Portugal) (Finland)	João Sousa; Henrik Sillanpää	6; 0	6; 2	6; 0
2	(Portugal) (Finland)	Rui Machado; Jarkko Nieminen	1; 6	6; 3	4; 6	3; 6
3	(Portugal) (Finland)	Gastão Elias / João Sousa; Henri Kontinen / Jarkko Nieminen	3; 6	7^{7} 6^{5}	6; 3	6; 4
4	(Portugal) (Finland)	João Sousa; Jarkko Nieminen	6; 3	6; 3	6; 4
5	(Portugal) (Finland)	Frederico Ferreira Silva; Micke Kontinen	3; 6	6; 1	6; 0

=== Hungary vs. Bosnia and Herzegovina ===
Hungary
3
Siófok KC, Siófok, Hungary
17–19 July 2015
Clay

Bosnia and Herzegovina
2

			1	2	3	4	5
1	(Hungary) (Bosnia and Herzegovina)	Márton Fucsovics; Tomislav Brkić	6; 2	6; 3	3; 6	4; 6	6; 3
2	(Hungary) (Bosnia and Herzegovina)	Péter Nagy; Mirza Bašić	6; 4	4; 6	3; 6	3; 6
3	(Hungary) (Bosnia and Herzegovina)	Márton Fucsovics / Levente Gödry; Mirza Bašić / Amer Delić	6; 3	6^{8} 7^{10}	4; 6	0; 6
4	(Hungary) (Bosnia and Herzegovina)	Márton Fucsovics; Mirza Bašić	6^{3} 7^{7}	6; 1	6; 3	6; 2
5	(Hungary) (Bosnia and Herzegovina)	Péter Nagy; Tomislav Brkić	6; 4	6; 3	6; 3

=== Luxembourg vs. Bulgaria ===
Luxembourg
0
Tennis Club Howald, Luxembourg City, Luxembourg
17–19 July 2015
Clay

Bulgaria
5

			1	2	3	4	5
1	(Luxembourg) (Bulgaria)	Ugo Nastasi; Dimitar Kuzmanov	3; 6	3; 6	1; 6
2	(Luxembourg) (Bulgaria)	Gilles Kremer; Grigor Dimitrov	1; 6	2; 6	4; 6
3	(Luxembourg) (Bulgaria)	Gilles Kremer / Mike Scheidweiler; Grigor Dimitrov / Dimitar Kutrovsky	3; 6	4; 6	4; 6
4	(Luxembourg) (Bulgaria)	Ugo Nastasi; Dimitar Kutrovsky	4; 6	2; 6
5	(Luxembourg) (Bulgaria)	Alex Knaff; Tihomir Grozdanov	3; 6	7; 5	4; 6

== Play-offs ==
=== South Africa vs. Ireland ===
South Africa
5
Irene Country Club, Centurion, South Africa
17–19 July 2015
Hard

Ireland
0

			1	2	3	4	5
1	(South Africa) (Republic of Ireland)	Fritz Wolmarans; James McGee	7^{7} 6^{0}	1; 6	6; 3	6; 4
2	(South Africa) (Republic of Ireland)	Tucker Vorster; Sam Barry	6; 1	6^{4} 7^{7}	7^{7} 6^{5}	6; 4
3	(South Africa) (Republic of Ireland)	Dean O'Brien / Ruan Roelofse; James Cluskey / David O'Hare	7^{7} 6^{4}	6; 4	6; 3
4	(South Africa) (Republic of Ireland)	Tucker Vorster; James McGee	6; 1	7; 5
5	(South Africa) (Republic of Ireland)	Ruan Roelofse; Sam Barry	6; 4	6; 3

=== Monaco vs. Morocco ===
Monaco
3
Monte Carlo Country Club, Roquebrune-Cap-Martin, Monaco
17–19 July 2015
Clay

Morocco
1

			1	2	3	4	5
1	(Monaco) (Morocco)	Benjamin Balleret; Yassine Idmbarek	6^{4} 7^{7}	4; 6	6; 1	6^{5} 7^{7}
2	(Monaco) (Morocco)	Romain Arneodo; Lamine Ouahab	1; 6	6; 1	6; 2	6; 4
3	(Monaco) (Morocco)	Romain Arneodo / Benjamin Balleret; Lamine Ouahab / Younès Rachidi	6; 0	6^{7} 7^{9}	6; 4	6; 2
4	(Monaco) (Morocco)	Benjamin Balleret; Lamine Ouahab	7; 5	4; 6	6; 3	6; 4
5	(Monaco) (Morocco)	Romain Arneodo; Yassine Idmbarek						not played

=== Zimbabwe vs. Moldova ===
Zimbabwe
5
Harare Sports Club, Harare, Zimbabwe
17–19 July 2015
Hard

Moldova
0

			1	2	3	4	5
1	(Zimbabwe) (Moldova)	Takanyi Garanganga; Maxim Bulat	6; 1	6; 2	6; 1
2	(Zimbabwe) (Moldova)	Benjamin Lock; Dmitrii Baskov	6; 2	6; 0	6; 2
3	(Zimbabwe) (Moldova)	Mark Fynn / Courtney John Lock; Dmitrii Baskov / Andrei Șoltoianu	7; 5	5; 7	7^{8} 6^{6}	6; 3
4	(Zimbabwe) (Moldova)	Takanyi Garanganga; Andrei Șoltoianu	6; 4	6; 1
5	(Zimbabwe) (Moldova)	Benjamin Lock; Egor Matvievici	6; 1	6; 0

=== Latvia vs. Madagascar ===
Latvia
3
Liepājas Tenisa Sporta Skola, Liepāja, Latvia
17–19 July 2015
Clay

Madagascar
2

			1	2	3	4	5
1	(Latvia) (Madagascar)	Mārtiņš Podžus; Jacob Rasolondrazana	6; 1	6; 2	7^{7} 6^{5}
2	(Latvia) (Madagascar)	Miķelis Lībietis; Antso Rakotondramanga	2; 6	3; 6	6^{4} 7^{7}
3	(Latvia) (Madagascar)	Miķelis Lībietis / Mārtiņš Podžus; Tony Rajaobelina / Antso Rakotondramanga	6; 1	6; 4	6; 2
4	(Latvia) (Madagascar)	Mārtiņš Podžus; Antso Rakotondramanga	2; 6	6; 2	4; 6	7^{8} 6^{6}	6; 4
5	(Latvia) (Madagascar)	Jānis Podžus; Jean-Jacques Rakotohasy	3; 6	2; 6

== Third round ==
=== Portugal vs. Belarus ===
Portugal
3
Clube de Ténis de Viana, Viana do Castelo, Portugal
18–20 September 2015
Clay

Belarus
2

			1	2	3	4	5
1	(Portugal) (Belarus)	João Sousa; Egor Gerasimov	6; 0	6; 1	2; 6	2; 6	4; 6
2	(Portugal) (Belarus)	Gastão Elias; Uladzimir Ignatik	6; 3	7^{7} 6^{3}	7; 5
3	(Portugal) (Belarus)	Gastão Elias / João Sousa; Sergey Betov / Max Mirnyi	7^{7} 6^{3}	4; 6	6; 3	6^{5} 7^{7}	6; 3
4	(Portugal) (Belarus)	João Sousa; Uladzimir Ignatik	6; 3	6; 2	6; 4
5	(Portugal) (Belarus)	Rui Machado; Egor Gerasimov	7^{7} 6^{3}	1; 6	4; 6

=== Bulgaria vs. Hungary ===
Bulgaria
2
Bulgarian National Tennis Center, Sofia, Bulgaria
18–20 September 2015
Clay

Hungary
3

			1	2	3	4	5
1	(Bulgaria) (Hungary)	Dimitar Kutrovsky; Péter Nagy	4; 6	0; 6	3; 6
2	(Bulgaria) (Hungary)	Dimitar Kuzmanov; Márton Fucsovics	3; 6	1; 6	1; 6
3	(Bulgaria) (Hungary)	Tihomir Grozdanov / Aleksandar Lazov; Márton Fucsovics / Levente Gödry	2; 6	7^{7} 6^{3}	6; 4	4; 6	6; 1
4	(Bulgaria) (Hungary)	Aleksandar Lazov; Márton Fucsovics	3; 6	4; 6	2; 6
5	(Bulgaria) (Hungary)	Dimitar Kuzmanov; Gábor Borsos	6; 2	6^{2} 7^{7}	6; 2
