= Artūrs Lazdiņš =

Latvian tennis player (born 1997)

- Country (sports): Latvia
- Born: 9 April 1997 (age 28) Dobele, Latvia
- Plays: Right-handed (two-handed backhand)
- Prize money: $11,760

Singles
- Career record: 0–1 (at ATP Tour level, Grand Slam level, and in Davis Cup)
- Career titles: 0 ITF
- Highest ranking: No. 1,234 (16 July 2018)
- Current ranking: No. 1,512 (9 March 2020)

Doubles
- Career record: 0–0 (at ATP Tour level, Grand Slam level, and in Davis Cup)
- Career titles: 1 ITF
- Highest ranking: No. 923 (5 August 2019)
- Current ranking: No. 1,021 (9 March 2020)
- Last updated on: 9 March 2020.

Artūrs Lazdiņš (born 9 April 1997) is a Latvian tennis player.

Lazdiņš has a career high ATP singles ranking of 1234 achieved on 16 July 2019. He also has a career high ATP doubles ranking of 923 achieved on 5 August 2019.

Lazdiņš represents Latvia at the Davis Cup where he has a W/L record of 3–2.

== Future and Challenger finals ==
=== Doubles 1 (1–0) ===
Legend
Challengers 0 (0–0)
Futures 1 (1–0)

Outcome	No.	Date	Tournament	Surface	Partner	Opponents	Score
Winner	1.	May 15, 2016	Wuhan, China F6	Hard	(Chinese Taipei) Yu Cheng-yu	(Japan) Arata Onozawa (Japan) Masato Shiga	6–3, 6–4

== Davis Cup ==
=== Participations: (3–2) ===
Group membership World Group (0–0) WG Play-off (0–0) Group I (0–1) Group II (0–0) Group III (3–1) Group IV (0–0)	Matches by surface Hard (0–1) Clay (3–1) Grass (0–0) Carpet (0–0)	Matches by type Singles (0–2) Doubles (3–0)

- ▲ ▼ indicates the outcome of the Davis Cup match followed by the score, date, place of event, the zonal classification and its phase, and the court surface.

Rubber outcome	No.	Rubber	Match type (partner if any)	Opponent nation	Opponent player(s)	Score
▼0–5; 31 January – 2 February 2014; Aegon Arena, Bratislava, Slovakia; Europe/Africa Group I First round; Hard (indoor) surface
Defeat	1	V	Singles (dead rubber)	Slovakia	Martin Kližan	3–6, 3–6
▼0–5; 3–5 February 2017; Zemgale Olympic Center, Jelgava, Latvia; Europe/Africa Group II First round; Hard (indoor) surface
Defeat	–	V	Singles (dead rubber)	Norway	Viktor Durasovic	WO *
▼1–2; 4 April 2018; Ulcinj Bellevue, Ulcinj, Montenegro; Europe/Africa Group III Round Robin; Clay surface
Victory	2	III	Doubles (with Mārtiņš Podžus) (dead rubber)	Greece	Markos Kalovelonis / Ioannis Stergiou	7–5, 6–3
▼1–2; 5 April 2018; Ulcinj Bellevue, Ulcinj, Montenegro; Europe/Africa Group III Round Robin; Clay surface
Defeat	3	I	Singles	Montenegro	Rrezart Cungu	3–6, 1–6
▲3–0; 11 September 2019; Tatoi Club, Athens, Greece; Europe/Africa Group III Round Robin; Clay surface
Victory	4	III	Doubles (with Jānis Podžus) (dead rubber)	Montenegro	Rrezart Cungu / Igor Saveljić	6–3, 6–4
▲3–0; 12 September 2019; Tatoi Club, Athens, Greece; Europe/Africa Group III Round Robin; Clay surface
Victory	5	III	Doubles (with Jānis Podžus) (dead rubber)	North Macedonia	Luka Ljuben Andonov / Berk Bugarikj	6–1, 6–3

* Walkover doesn't count in his overall record.
