= 2014 Davis Cup Europe/Africa Zone Group I =

International tennis competition

The Europe and Africa Zone is one of the three zones of the regional Davis Cup competition in 2014.

In the Europe and Africa Zone there are four different groups in which teams compete against each other to advance to the next group. Winners in Group I advance to the World Group play-offs, along with losing teams from the World Group first round. Teams who lose their respective ties will compete in the relegation play-offs, with winning teams remaining in Group I, whereas teams who lose their play-offs will be relegated to the Europe/Africa Group II in 2015.

== Participating teams ==
Seeds:

1. Croatia
2. Austria
3. Israel
4. Sweden

Remaining nations:

- Latvia
- Poland
- Portugal
- Romania
- Russia
- Slovakia
- Slovenia
- Ukraine

=== Draw ===
All seeded teams get a bye into the second round.

Second round play-offs
Moscow, Russia (indoor hard)
Russia	4
Portugal	1
Jönköping, Sweden (indoor hard)
4	Sweden	3
Latvia	2

First round play-offs
bye
Russia
bye
Portugal
Bucharest, Romania (clay)
Romania	3
4	Sweden	1
Valmiera, Latvia (indoor hard)
Latvia	1
2	Austria	4

First round
1	Croatia
bye
Moscow, Russia (hard, indoor)
Russia	2
Poland	3
3	Israel
bye
Kranj, Slovenia (hard, indoor)
Portugal	2
Slovenia	3
Dnipropetrovsk, Ukraine (hard, indoor)
Ukraine	3
Romania	1
bye
4	Sweden
Bratislava, Slovak Rep. (hard, indoor)
Slovakia	5
Latvia	0
bye
2	Austria

Second round
Warsaw, Poland (hard, indoor)
1	Croatia	3
Poland	1
Portorož, Slovenia (clay)
3	Israel	3
Slovenia	1
Malmö, Sweden (hard, indoor)
Ukraine	4
4	Sweden	1
Bratislava, Slovakia (hard, indoor)
Slovakia	4
2	Austria	1

- Portugal and Latvia relegated to Group II in 2015.
- Croatia, Israel, Ukraine, and Slovakia advance to World Group Play-off.

== First round ==
=== Russia vs. Poland ===
Russia
2
Olympic Stadium, Moscow, Russia
31 January – 2 February 2014
hard (indoor)

Poland
3

			1	2	3	4	5
1	(Russia) (Poland)	Karen Khachanov; Jerzy Janowicz	2; 6	4; 6	4; 6
2	(Russia) (Poland)	Dmitry Tursunov; Michał Przysiężny	6; 3	3; 6	7^{7} 6^{3}	6; 2
3	(Russia) (Poland)	Konstantin Kravchuk / Karen Khachanov; Mariusz Fyrstenberg / Marcin Matkowski	6; 2	4; 6	1; 6	0; 6
4	(Russia) (Poland)	Dmitry Tursunov; Jerzy Janowicz	3; 6	5; 7	6^{3} 7^{7}
5	(Russia) (Poland)	Teymuraz Gabashvili; Michał Przysiężny	7; 5	7; 5

=== Portugal vs. Slovenia ===
Slovenia
3
Tennis Club Triglav Kranj, Kranj, Slovenia
31 January – 2 February 2014
hard (indoor)

Portugal
2

			1	2	3	4	5
1	(Slovenia) (Portugal)	Janež Semrajč; João Sousa	1; 6	4; 6	6; 4	0; 6
2	(Slovenia) (Portugal)	Blaž Kavčič; Gastão Elias	7^{16} 6^{14}	6; 1	6; 4
3	(Slovenia) (Portugal)	Blaž Kavčič / Grega Žemlja; Gastão Elias / João Sousa	6; 3	7; 5	7^{7} 6^{5}
4	(Slovenia) (Portugal)	Blaž Kavčič; João Sousa	7; 5	7; 5	6; 2
5	(Slovenia) (Portugal)	Mike Urbanija; Frederico Silva	6; 4	3; 4				retired

=== Ukraine vs. Romania ===
Ukraine
3
Megaron Tennis Club, Dnipropetrovsk, Ukraine
31 January – 2 February 2014
hard (indoor)

Romania
1

			1	2	3	4	5
1	(Ukraine) (Romania)	Sergiy Stakhovsky; Adrian Ungur	6; 3	6; 1	6; 3
2	(Ukraine) (Romania)	Illya Marchenko; Victor Hănescu	4; 6	2; 6	6; 3	7^{8} 6^{6}	6; 4
3	(Ukraine) (Romania)	Sergey Bubka / Denys Molchanov; Marius Copil / Horia Tecău	7; 5	3; 6	4; 6	4; 6
4	(Ukraine) (Romania)	Sergiy Stakhovsky; Victor Hănescu	3; 6	6; 3	6; 2	6; 3
5	(Ukraine) (Romania)	Illya Marchenko; Adrian Ungur						not played

=== Slovakia vs. Latvia ===
Slovakia
5
Aegon Arena, Bratislava, Slovakia
31 January – 2 February 2014
hard (indoor)

Latvia
0

			1	2	3	4	5
1	(Slovakia) (Latvia)	Lukáš Lacko; Martins Podzus	3; 6	6; 3	6; 3	6; 1
2	(Slovakia) (Latvia)	Martin Kližan; Andis Juška	6; 4	6^{4} 7^{7}	6; 3	4; 6	8; 6
3	(Slovakia) (Latvia)	Andrej Martin / Michal Mertiňák; Andis Juška / Janis Podzus	7; 5	6; 1	3; 6	6; 3
4	(Slovakia) (Latvia)	Andrej Martin; Janis Podzus	6; 4	6^{5} 7^{7}	6; 3
5	(Slovakia) (Latvia)	Martin Kližan; Arturs Lazdins	6; 3	6; 3

== Second round ==
=== Poland vs. Croatia ===
Poland
1
Torwar Hall, Warsaw, Poland
4–6 April 2014
hard, indoor

Croatia
3

			1	2	3	4	5
1	(Poland) (Croatia)	Michał Przysiężny; Marin Čilić	1; 6	4; 6	4; 6
2	(Poland) (Croatia)	Jerzy Janowicz; Borna Ćorić	6; 2	2; 6	5; 7	7; 5	4; 6
3	(Poland) (Croatia)	Mariusz Fyrstenberg / Marcin Matkowski; Marin Draganja / Mate Pavić	6^{1} 7^{7}	7^{7} 6^{4}	4; 6	7^{7} 6^{2}	6; 4
4	(Poland) (Croatia)	Jerzy Janowicz; Marin Čilić	6; 2	7^{7} 6^{5}	4; 6	1; 6	3; 6
5	(Poland) (Croatia)	Michał Przysiężny; Borna Ćorić						not played

=== Slovenia vs. Israel ===
Slovenia
1
SRC Marina, Portorož, Slovenia
4–6 April 2014
clay

Israel
3

			1	2	3	4	5
1	(Slovenia) (Israel)	Blaž Kavčič; Amir Weintraub	6; 4	5; 7	3; 6	6; 3	4; 6
2	(Slovenia) (Israel)	Blaž Rola; Dudi Sela	6; 3	6; 4	6; 4
3	(Slovenia) (Israel)	Blaž Rola / Grega Žemlja; Jonathan Erlich / Andy Ram	6^{7} 7^{9}	6; 4	6^{5} 7^{7}	3; 6
4	(Slovenia) (Israel)	Grega Žemlja; Dudi Sela	2; 6	7^{7} 6^{5}	0; 6	2; 6
5	(Slovenia) (Israel)	Blaž Rola; Amir Weintraub						not played

=== Sweden vs. Ukraine ===
Sweden
1
Baltiska Hallen, Malmö, Sweden
4–6 April 2014
hard, indoor

Ukraine
4

			1	2	3	4	5
1	(Sweden) (Ukraine)	Johan Brunström; Sergiy Stakhovsky	4; 6	4; 6	7; 5	6; 3	11; 13
2	(Sweden) (Ukraine)	Markus Eriksson; Artem Smirnov	4; 6	1; 6	2; 6
3	(Sweden) (Ukraine)	Johan Brunström / Robert Lindstedt; Sergey Bubka / Denys Molchanov	7^{7} 6^{4}	6^{6} 7^{8}	3; 6	6; 4	10; 8
4	(Sweden) (Ukraine)	Markus Eriksson; Sergiy Stakhovsky	6^{5} 7^{7}	6^{4} 7^{7}	4; 6
5	(Sweden) (Ukraine)	Robert Lindstedt; Sergey Bubka	7; 5	6^{3} 7^{7}				retired

=== Slovakia vs. Austria ===
Slovakia
4
Aegon Arena, National Tennis Centre, Bratislava, Slovakia
4–6 April 2014
hard, indoor

Austria
1

			1	2	3	4	5
1	(Slovakia) (Austria)	Norbert Gomboš; Dominic Thiem	6; 4	3; 6	6; 3	6; 4
2	(Slovakia) (Austria)	Lukáš Lacko; Andreas Haider-Maurer	7^{7} 6^{3}	4; 6	4; 6	6; 2	6; 3
3	(Slovakia) (Austria)	Martin Kližan / Michal Mertiňák; Dominic Thiem / Alexander Peya	6^{4} 7^{7}	3; 6	7^{7} 6^{5}	6; 4	6; 4
4	(Slovakia) (Austria)	Norbert Gomboš; Andreas Haider-Maurer	6^{5} 7^{7}	5; 7
5	(Slovakia) (Austria)	Lukáš Lacko; Gerald Melzer	4; 6	6; 3	6; 2

== First round play-offs ==
=== Romania vs. Sweden ===
Romania
3
Arenele BNR, Bucharest, Romania
12–14 September 2014
clay

Sweden
1

			1	2	3	4	5
1	(Romania) (Sweden)	Adrian Ungur; Christian Lindell	5; 7	6^{2} 7^{7}	4; 6
2	(Romania) (Sweden)	Marius Copil; Elias Ymer	6; 2	6; 3	6; 2
3	(Romania) (Sweden)	Florin Mergea / Horia Tecău; Isak Arvidsson / Johan Brunström	7^{7} 6^{2}	7^{7} 6^{5}	6; 3
4	(Romania) (Sweden)	Adrian Ungur; Elias Ymer	3; 6	6; 4	7^{7} 6^{4}	6; 3
5	(Romania) (Sweden)	Marius Copil; Christian Lindell						not played

=== Latvia vs. Austria ===
Latvia
1
Vidzemes Olimpiskaos Centrs, Valmiera, Latvia
12–14 September 2014
hard, indoor

Austria
4

			1	2	3	4	5
1	(Latvia) (Austria)	Andis Juška; Martin Fischer	3; 6	3; 6	2; 6
2	(Latvia) (Austria)	Janis Podzus; Jürgen Melzer	3; 6	1; 6	4; 6
3	(Latvia) (Austria)	Ernests Gulbis / Miķelis Lībietis; Philipp Oswald / Alexander Peya	7; 5	7^{7} 6^{3}	6; 4
4	(Latvia) (Austria)	Miķelis Lībietis; Jürgen Melzer	2; 6	2; 6	4; 6
5	(Latvia) (Austria)	Janis Podzus; Martin Fischer	6^{6} 7^{8}	3; 6

== Second round play-offs ==
=== Russia vs. Portugal ===
Russia
4
Olympic Stadium, Moscow, Russia
12–14 September 2014
hard (RuKortHard), indoor

Portugal
1

			1	2	3	4	5
1	(Russia) (Portugal)	Andrey Kuznetsov; Gastão Elias	6; 2	6; 4	6; 4
2	(Russia) (Portugal)	Evgeny Donskoy; João Sousa	7^{9} 6^{7}	6; 4	3; 6	6; 1
3	(Russia) (Portugal)	Konstantin Kravchuk / Andrey Rublev; Gastão Elias / João Sousa	6; 3	6; 4	6; 4
4	(Russia) (Portugal)	Konstantin Kravchuk; Rui Machado	7^{7} 6^{4}	4; 6	1; 6
5	(Russia) (Portugal)	Andrey Rublev; Frederico Ferreira Silva	6; 4	6; 4

=== Sweden vs. Latvia ===
Sweden
3
Racketcentrum, Jönköping, Sweden
24–26 October 2014
hard, indoor

Latvia
2

			1	2	3	4	5
1	(Sweden) (Latvia)	Elias Ymer; Martins Podzus	6^{3} 7^{7}	5; 7	7^{7} 6^{5}	6; 3	7; 9
2	(Sweden) (Latvia)	Christian Lindell; Janis Podzus	7^{7} 6^{5}	4; 6	7^{7} 6^{3}	7^{9} 6^{7}
3	(Sweden) (Latvia)	Johan Brunström / Robert Lindstedt; Miķelis Lībietis / Janis Podzus	6; 4	6; 2	3; 6	4; 6	6; 3
4	(Sweden) (Latvia)	Christian Lindell; Martins Podzus	4; 6	7^{7} 6^{3}	4; 6	2; 6
5	(Sweden) (Latvia)	Elias Ymer; Janis Podzus	7; 5	6^{7} 7^{9}	6; 3	6; 4
