= 2016 Davis Cup Europe/Africa Zone Group II =

International tennis competition

The Europe/Africa Zone was one of the three zones of the regional Davis Cup competition in 2016.

In the Europe/Africa Zone there were three different tiers, called groups, in which teams competed against each other to advance to the upper tier. Winners in Group II advanced to the Europe/Africa Zone Group I. Teams who lost their respective ties competed in the relegation play-offs, with winning teams remaining in Group II, whereas European and African teams who lost their play-offs were relegated respectively to the Europe and Africa Zone Group III in 2017.

== Participating nations ==
Seeds:

1. Lithuania
2. Denmark
3. Belarus
4. Bulgaria
5. Bosnia and Herzegovina
6. Latvia
7. Finland
8. South Africa

Remaining nations:

- Egypt
- Georgia
- Luxembourg
- Monaco
- Norway
- Tunisia
- Turkey
- Zimbabwe

=== Draw ===
Play-offs
Capellen, Luxembourg (hard)
Norway	3
Luxembourg	2
Tunis, Tunisia (hard)
4	Bulgaria	2
Tunisia	3
Roquebrune-Cap-Martin, Monaco (clay)
Monaco	3
Egypt	1
Tbilisi, Georgia (hard)
Zimbabwe	2
Georgia	3

First Round
Šiauliai, Lithuania (indoor hard)
1	Lithuania	3
Norway	2
Centurion, South Africa (hard)
8	South Africa	5
Luxembourg	0
Ankara, Turkey (indoor hard)
4	Bulgaria	2
Turkey	3
Zenica, Bosnia and Herz. (indoor carpet)
5	Bosnia and Herzegovina	3
Tunisia	1
Daugavpils, Latvia (indoor hard)
Monaco	2
6	Latvia	3
Cairo, Egypt (clay)
Egypt	1
3	Belarus	3
Kittilä, Finland (indoor hard)
Zimbabwe	1
7	Finland	4
Tbilisi, Georgia (indoor carpet)
Georgia	0
2	Denmark	5

Second Round
Kaunas, Lithuania (clay)
1	Lithuania	3
8	South Africa	2
Bihać, Bosnia and Herzegovina (clay)
Turkey	1
5	Bosnia and Herzegovina	3
Minsk, Belarus (hard)
6	Latvia	1
3	Belarus	4
Kongens Lyngby, Den. (indoor carpet)
7	Finland	2
2	Denmark	3

Third Round
Vilnius, Lithuania (indoor hard)
1	Lithuania	0
5	Bosnia and Herzegovina	5
Minsk, Belarus (hard)
3	Belarus	4
2	Denmark	1

- Luxembourg, Bulgaria, Egypt, and Zimbabwe relegated to Group III in 2017.
- Bosnia and Herzegovina and Belarus promoted to Group I in 2017.

== First round ==
=== Lithuania vs. Norway ===
Lithuania
3
Šiauliai Arena, Šiauliai, Lithuania
4–6 March 2016
Hard (i)

Norway
2

			1	2	3	4	5
1	(Lithuania) (Norway)	Laurynas Grigelis; Viktor Durasovic	5; 7	6; 3	4; 6	6; 4	6^{2} 7^{7}
2	(Lithuania) (Norway)	Ričardas Berankis; Casper Ruud	6; 2	6; 1	6; 4
3	(Lithuania) (Norway)	Ričardas Berankis / Laurynas Grigelis; Viktor Durasovic / Casper Ruud	6; 2	7^{7} 6^{2}	6; 1
4	(Lithuania) (Norway)	Ričardas Berankis; Viktor Durasovic	6; 2	6; 1	6; 0
5	(Lithuania) (Norway)	Laurynas Grigelis; Casper Ruud	3; 6	3; 6

=== South Africa vs. Luxembourg ===
South Africa
5
Irene Country Club, Centurion, South Africa
4–6 March 2016
Hard

Luxembourg
0

			1	2	3	4	5
1	(South Africa) (Luxembourg)	Tucker Vorster; Alex Knaff	6; 1	6; 4	6; 4
2	(South Africa) (Luxembourg)	Lloyd Harris; Ugo Nastasi	6; 1	6; 4	6; 4
3	(South Africa) (Luxembourg)	Dean O'Brien / Ruan Roelofse; Ugo Nastasi / Mike Scheidweiler	6; 3	7; 5	6; 2
4	(South Africa) (Luxembourg)	Tucker Vorster; Tom Diederich	6; 3	6; 4
5	(South Africa) (Luxembourg)	Lloyd Harris; Alex Knaff	6; 2	6; 1

=== Turkey vs. Bulgaria ===
Turkey
3
Ankara Tenis Kulübü, Ankara, Turkey
4–6 March 2016
Hard (i)

Bulgaria
2

			1	2	3	4	5
1	(Turkey) (Bulgaria)	Cem İlkel; Dimitar Kuzmanov	7^{7} 6^{4}	1; 6	6; 4	1; 6	7; 5
2	(Turkey) (Bulgaria)	Marsel İlhan; Alexandar Lazarov	6; 4	6; 2	6; 3
3	(Turkey) (Bulgaria)	Tuna Altuna / Cem İlkel; Alexander Lazov / Vasko Mladenov	6^{6} 7^{8}	7^{7} 6^{5}	7^{7} 6^{4}	6^{5} 7^{7}	4; 6
4	(Turkey) (Bulgaria)	Marsel İlhan; Dimitar Kuzmanov	4; 6	6; 2	6; 4	4; 6	6; 0
5	(Turkey) (Bulgaria)	Altuğ Çelikbilek; Alexandar Lazarov	6; 4	4; 6	4; 6

=== Bosnia and Herzegovina vs. Tunisia ===
Bosnia and Herzegovina
3
Arena Zenica, Zenica, Bosnia and Herzegovina
4–6 March 2016
Carpet (i)

Tunisia
1

			1	2	3	4	5
1	(Bosnia and Herzegovina) (Tunisia)	Mirza Bašić; Anis Ghorbel	6; 2	6; 4	6; 2
2	(Bosnia and Herzegovina) (Tunisia)	Tomislav Brkić; Malek Jaziri	7^{7} 6^{5}	2; 6	6^{7} 7^{9}	7^{7} 6^{5}	4; 6
3	(Bosnia and Herzegovina) (Tunisia)	Mirza Bašić / Tomislav Brkić; Malek Jaziri / Skander Mansouri	6^{2} 7^{7}	4; 6	6; 3	7; 5	6; 4
4	(Bosnia and Herzegovina) (Tunisia)	Mirza Bašić; Malek Jaziri	5; 7	4; 6	7^{8} 6^{6}	7^{18} 6^{16}	6; 3
5	(Bosnia and Herzegovina) (Tunisia)	Tomislav Brkić; Anis Ghorbel						not played

=== Latvia vs. Monaco ===
Latvia
3
Daugavpils Olimpiskais Centrs, Daugavpils, Latvia
4–6 March 2016
Hard (i)

Monaco
2

			1	2	3	4	5
1	(Latvia) (Monaco)	Mārtiņš Podžus; Romain Arneodo	7^{7} 6^{5}	6; 4	7^{8} 6^{6}
2	(Latvia) (Monaco)	Miķelis Lībietis; Benjamin Balleret	3; 6	6; 4	3; 6	6; 3	6; 4
3	(Latvia) (Monaco)	Miķelis Lībietis / Mārtiņš Podžus; Romain Arneodo / Benjamin Balleret	6; 3	6; 2	7; 5
4	(Latvia) (Monaco)	Rūdolfs Mednis; Lucas Catarina	2; 5					retired
5	(Latvia) (Monaco)	Mārtiņš Podžus; Benjamin Balleret						w/o

=== Egypt vs. Belarus ===
Egypt
1
Gezira Sporting Club, Cairo, Egypt
4–6 March 2016
Clay

Belarus
3

			1	2	3	4	5
1	(Egypt) (Belarus)	Karim-Mohamed Maamoun; Egor Gerasimov	2; 6	3; 6	1; 6
2	(Egypt) (Belarus)	Mohamed Safwat; Ilya Ivashka	7; 5	0; 6	6; 3	6^{3} 7^{7}	5; 7
3	(Egypt) (Belarus)	Youssef Hossam / Mohamed Safwat; Alexander Bury / Egor Gerasimov	7^{9} 6^{7}	4; 6	6; 4	4; 6	7; 5
4	(Egypt) (Belarus)	Mohamed Safwat; Egor Gerasimov	7^{7} 6^{2}	5; 7	5; 7	4; 6
5	(Egypt) (Belarus)	Youssef Hossam; Ilya Ivashka						not played

=== Finland vs. Zimbabwe ===
Finland
4
Kittilän Urheiluhalli, Kittilä, Finland
4–6 March 2016
Hard (i)

Zimbabwe
1

			1	2	3	4	5
1	(Finland) (Zimbabwe)	Jarkko Nieminen; Courtney John Lock	6; 0	6; 0	6; 0
2	(Finland) (Zimbabwe)	Harri Heliövaara; Takanyi Garanganga	3; 6	6; 3	4; 6	6; 4	6; 4
3	(Finland) (Zimbabwe)	Henri Kontinen / Jarkko Nieminen; Mark Fynn / Courtney John Lock	6; 1	6; 0	6; 1
4	(Finland) (Zimbabwe)	Eero Vasa; Takanyi Garanganga	6^{5} 7^{7}	5; 7
5	(Finland) (Zimbabwe)	Harri Heliövaara; Courtney John Lock	6; 1	6; 0

=== Georgia vs. Denmark ===
Georgia
0
New Sport Hall, Tbilisi, Georgia
4–6 March 2016
Carpet (i)

Denmark
5

			1	2	3	4	5
1	(Georgia (country)) (Denmark)	Nikoloz Basilashvili; Christian Sigsgaard	7^{7} 6^{4}	1; 6	4; 6	4; 6
2	(Georgia (country)) (Denmark)	George Tsivadze; Frederik Nielsen	6^{3} 7^{7}	0; 6	1; 6
3	(Georgia (country)) (Denmark)	Nikoloz Basilashvili / George Tsivadze; Thomas Kromann / Frederik Nielsen	6^{0} 7^{7}	1; 6	2; 6
4	(Georgia (country)) (Denmark)	Giorgi Javakhishvili; Benjamin Hannestad	1; 6	0; 3				retired
5	(Georgia (country)) (Denmark)	Irakli Metreveli; Christian Sigsgaard	1; 6	1; 6

== Second round ==
=== Lithuania vs. South Africa ===
Lithuania
3
Azuolynas Tennis Centre, Kaunas, Lithuania
15–17 July 2016
Clay

South Africa
2

			1	2	3	4	5
1	(Lithuania) (South Africa)	Laurynas Grigelis; Tucker Vorster	6^{1} 7^{7}	6; 3	6; 3	6; 2
2	(Lithuania) (South Africa)	Lukas Mugevičius; Lloyd Harris	3; 6	7^{7} 6^{5}	6; 0	6; 4
3	(Lithuania) (South Africa)	Laurynas Grigelis / Lukas Mugevičius; Raven Klaasen / Ruan Roelofse	1; 6	1; 6	3; 6
4	(Lithuania) (South Africa)	Laurynas Grigelis; Lloyd Harris	6; 1	6; 1	6; 3
5	(Lithuania) (South Africa)	Tadas Babelis; Tucker Vorster	3; 6	2; 6

=== Bosnia and Herzegovina vs. Turkey ===
Bosnia and Herzegovina
3
Javna ustanova za sport, odmor i rekreaciju, Bihać, Bosnia and Herzegovina
15–17 July 2016
Clay

Turkey
1

			1	2	3	4	5
1	(Bosnia and Herzegovina) (Turkey)	Damir Džumhur; Cem İlkel	7; 5	6; 1	4; 6	6; 1
2	(Bosnia and Herzegovina) (Turkey)	Mirza Bašić; Marsel İlhan	6^{9} 7^{11}	7; 5	6; 2	3; 6	5; 7
3	(Bosnia and Herzegovina) (Turkey)	Mirza Bašić / Tomislav Brkić; Tuna Altuna / Cem İlkel	6; 2	6; 4	6; 1
4	(Bosnia and Herzegovina) (Turkey)	Damir Džumhur; Marsel İlhan	6; 3	6; 0	7^{7} 6^{5}
5	(Bosnia and Herzegovina) (Turkey)	Mirza Bašić; Cem İlkel						not played

=== Belarus vs. Latvia ===
Belarus
4
National Olympic Training Centre, Minsk, Belarus
15–17 July 2016
Hard

Latvia
1

			1	2	3	4	5
1	(Belarus) (Latvia)	Ilya Ivashka; Mārtiņš Podžus	6; 4	6; 2	7; 5
2	(Belarus) (Latvia)	Yaraslau Shyla; Miķelis Lībietis	6; 2	6; 1	6; 3
3	(Belarus) (Latvia)	Aliaksandr Bury / Andrei Vasilevski; Miķelis Lībietis / Jānis Podžus	6; 3	3; 6	4; 6	6^{2} 7^{7}
4	(Belarus) (Latvia)	Ilya Ivashka; Jānis Podžus	6; 2	7; 5	6; 0
5	(Belarus) (Latvia)	Yaraslau Shyla; Rūdolfs Mednis	7^{8} 6^{6}	6; 3

=== Denmark vs. Finland ===
Denmark
3
Lyngbyhallen, Kongens Lyngby, Denmark
15–17 July 2016
Carpet (i)

Finland
2

			1	2	3	4	5
1	(Denmark) (Finland)	Mikael Torpegaard; Jarkko Nieminen	6^{1} 7^{7}	5; 7	2; 6
2	(Denmark) (Finland)	Frederik Nielsen; Harri Heliövaara	6; 4	6; 3	7^{7} 6^{5}
3	(Denmark) (Finland)	Thomas Kromann / Frederik Nielsen; Jarkko Nieminen / Patrik Niklas-Salminen	6; 1	6; 3	4; 6	4; 6	6; 4
4	(Denmark) (Finland)	Frederik Nielsen; Jarkko Nieminen	3; 6	6; 3	1; 6	6^{3} 7^{7}
5	(Denmark) (Finland)	Mikael Torpegaard; Harri Heliövaara	4; 6	3; 6	7^{7} 6^{2}	6; 1	7; 5

== Play-offs ==
=== Luxembourg vs. Norway ===
Luxembourg
2
Tennis Club Cap on Line, Capellen, Luxembourg
15–17 July 2016
Hard

Norway
3

			1	2	3	4	5
1	(Luxembourg) (Norway)	Alex Knaff; Casper Ruud	2; 6	4; 6	4; 6
2	(Luxembourg) (Norway)	Ugo Nastasi; Viktor Durasovic	4; 6	6; 3	2; 6	2; 6
3	(Luxembourg) (Norway)	Gilles Kremer / Mike Scheidweiler; Viktor Durasovic / Casper Ruud	6; 2	6; 2	5; 7	6; 0
4	(Luxembourg) (Norway)	Ugo Nastasi; Casper Ruud	7^{7} 6^{5}	2; 6	7^{7} 6^{0}	6^{4} 7^{7}	6; 4
5	(Luxembourg) (Norway)	Gilles Kremer; Viktor Durasovic	6^{2} 7^{7}	3; 6	6; 4	6; 4	3; 6

=== Tunisia vs. Bulgaria ===
Tunisia
3
Tennis Courts of Cité Nationale Sportive, Tunis, Tunisia
15–17 July 2016
Hard

Bulgaria
2

			1	2	3	4	5
1	(Tunisia) (Bulgaria)	Mohamed Aziz Dougaz; Dimitar Kuzmanov	7^{7} 6^{4}	6; 4	2; 6	7; 5
2	(Tunisia) (Bulgaria)	Malek Jaziri; Alexandar Lazarov	6; 4	6; 4	6; 1
3	(Tunisia) (Bulgaria)	Malek Jaziri / Skander Mansouri; Aleksandar Lazov / Vasko Mladenov	6; 4	6; 4	6; 3
4	(Tunisia) (Bulgaria)	Moez Echargui; Vasko Mladenov	7^{7} 6^{5}	5; 7	6^{5} 7^{7}
5	(Tunisia) (Bulgaria)	Mohamed Aziz Dougaz; Alexandar Lazarov	6; 4	4; 6	6^{1} 7^{7}

=== Monaco vs. Egypt ===
Monaco
3
Monte Carlo Country Club, Roquebrune-Cap-Martin, Monaco
15–17 July 2016
Clay

Egypt
1

			1	2	3	4	5
1	(Monaco) (Egypt)	Benjamin Balleret; Karim-Mohamed Maamoun	1; 6	7; 5	4; 6	2; 6
2	(Monaco) (Egypt)	Romain Arneodo; Mohamed Safwat	6^{6} 7^{8}	3; 6	6; 4	6; 2	6; 2
3	(Monaco) (Egypt)	Romain Arneodo / Benjamin Balleret; Sherif Sabry / Mohamed Safwat	6; 1	6; 2	6; 2
4	(Monaco) (Egypt)	Benjamin Balleret; Youssef Hossam	4; 6	6; 1	6; 1	6; 1
5	(Monaco) (Egypt)	Romain Arneodo; Karim-Mohamed Maamoun						not played

=== Georgia vs. Zimbabwe ===
Georgia
3
Mziuri Tennis Club, Tbilisi, Georgia
15–17 July 2016
Hard

Zimbabwe
2

			1	2	3	4	5
1	(Georgia (country)) (Zimbabwe)	George Tsivadze; Benjamin Lock	6; 3	0; 6	5; 7	7^{7} 6^{2}	4; 6
2	(Georgia (country)) (Zimbabwe)	Nikoloz Basilashvili; Mark Fynn	6; 3	6; 3	6; 2
3	(Georgia (country)) (Zimbabwe)	Nikoloz Basilashvili / Nodar Itonishvili; Benjamin Lock / Courtney John Lock	6; 3	6; 3	6^{6} 7^{8}	4; 6	4; 6
4	(Georgia (country)) (Zimbabwe)	Nikoloz Basilashvili; Benjamin Lock	6; 3	6; 4	6; 2
5	(Georgia (country)) (Zimbabwe)	George Tsivadze; Mark Fynn	6; 3	7; 5	6; 3

== Third round ==
=== Lithuania vs. Bosnia and Herzegovina ===
Lithuania
0
Siemens Arena, Vilnius, Lithuania
16–18 September 2016
Hard (i)

Bosnia and Herzegovina
5

			1	2	3	4	5
1	(Lithuania) (Bosnia and Herzegovina)	Lukas Mugevičius; Damir Džumhur	2; 6	2; 6	3; 6
2	(Lithuania) (Bosnia and Herzegovina)	Laurynas Grigelis; Mirza Bašić	6^{5} 7^{7}	6^{0} 7^{7}	6; 3	3; 6
3	(Lithuania) (Bosnia and Herzegovina)	Laurynas Grigelis / Lukas Mugevičius; Mirza Bašić / Tomislav Brkić	4; 6	4; 6	2; 6
4	(Lithuania) (Bosnia and Herzegovina)	Tadas Babelis; Tomislav Brkić	4; 6	6; 3	2; 6
5	(Lithuania) (Bosnia and Herzegovina)	Tomas Vaise; Nerman Fatić	5; 7	5; 7

=== Belarus vs. Denmark ===
Belarus
4
Republic Olympic Training Center, Minsk, Belarus
16–18 September 2016
Hard

Denmark
1

			1	2	3	4	5
1	(Belarus) (Denmark)	Yaraslav Shyla; Frederik Nielsen	5; 7	3; 6	6; 1	6; 2	5; 7
2	(Belarus) (Denmark)	Ilya Ivashka; Andreas Bjerrehus	6; 2	6; 0	6; 0
3	(Belarus) (Denmark)	Max Mirnyi / Yaraslav Shyla; Thomas Kromann / Frederik Nielsen	6; 2	6; 4	4; 6	6; 2
4	(Belarus) (Denmark)	Ilya Ivashka; Frederik Nielsen	6; 4	4; 6	7; 5	5; 7	6; 4
5	(Belarus) (Denmark)	Egor Gerasimov; Benjamin Hannestad	6^{7} 7^{9}	6; 4	6; 2
