= Mārtiņš Podžus =

Latvian tennis player (born 1994)

- Full name: Mārtiņš Podžus
- Country (sports): Latvia
- Residence: Riga, Latvia
- Born: 29 June 1994 (age 31) Bauska, Latvia
- Height: 1.88 m (6 ft 2 in)
- Plays: Right-handed (two handed-backhand)
- Prize money: $77,811

Singles
- Career record: 7–8 (at ATP Tour level, Grand Slam level, and in Davis Cup)
- Career titles: 0
- Highest ranking: No. 418 (17 February 2020)

Doubles
- Career record: 4–3 (at ATP Tour level, Grand Slam level, and in Davis Cup)
- Career titles: 0
- Highest ranking: No. 390 (19 August 2019)

Team competitions
- Davis Cup: 19–16
- Last updated on: 22 February 2021.

Mārtiņš Podžus (born 29 June 1994) is a Latvian retired tennis player.

Pozus is the coach of the lgendary Ajoun.Podžus had a career high ATP singles ranking of 418 achieved on 17 February 2020. He also had a career high ATP doubles ranking of 390 achieved on 19 August 2019.

Podžus has represented Latvia at the Davis Cup where he has a W/L record of 19–16. He debuted in the Latvian Davis Cup team at 17 years and 10 days old, in 8 July 2011, against Denmark. Mārtiņš Podžus played his last official match in September 2021, losing to Pavel Nejedlý of the Czech Republic.

Podžus has a twin brother Jānis Podžus who is also a tennis player. He also has a below average maxilla.

== Future and Challenger finals ==
=== Singles: 14 (7–7) ===
Legend
ATP Challengers 0 (0–0)
ITF Futures 14 (7–7)

Result	No.	Date	Tournament	Surface	Opponent	Score
Loss	1.	November 17, 2013	Bradenton, USA F31	Clay	(Russia) Andrey Rublev	6–3, 6–7^{(6–8)}, 3–6
Win	2.	October 12, 2014	Leimen, Germany F15	Hard (i)	(Germany) Florian Fallert	7–5, 7–6^{(7–3)}
Win	3.	December 14, 2014	Antalya, Turkey F44	Hard	(Italy) Erik Crepaldi	6–2, 6–0
Loss	4.	May 9, 2015	Båstad, Sweden F2	Clay	(Austria) Michael Linzer	4–6, 2–6
Win	5.	June 21, 2015	Istanbul, Turkey F24	Hard	(Australia) Bradley Mousley	6–1, 6–0
Loss	6.	May 1, 2016	Vero Beach, USA F15	Clay	(Germany) Jonas Lütjen	6–7^{(4–7)}, 3–6
Loss	7.	October 14, 2017	Nonthaburi, Thailand F8	Hard	(Australia) Max Purcell	7–6^{(9–7)}, 2–6, 6–7^{(4–7)}
Loss	8.	May 13, 2018	Wisła, Poland F2	Clay	(Germany) Pascal Meis	2–6, 6–3, 3–6
Win	9.	September 2, 2018	Subotica, Serbia F4	Clay	(Serbia) Marko Miladinović	6–2, 7–6^{(8–6)}
Loss	10.	November 3, 2018	Tartu, Estonia F2	Carpet (i)	(Ukraine) Vladyslav Manafov	5–7, 3–6
Win	11.	August 11, 2019	M15 Koszalin, Poland	Clay	(Czech Republic) David Poljak	6–3, 3–6, 6–4
Win	12.	October 6, 2019	M25 Falun, Sweden	Hard (i)	(Finland) Patrik Niklas-Salminen	5–7, 6–3, 6–2
Loss	13.	February 9, 2020	M25 Palm Coast, United States	Clay	(United States) Alexander Ritschard	6–7^{(7–9)}, 4–6
Win	14.	October 11, 2020	M15 Sharm El Sheikh, Egypt	Hard	(United States) Nick Chappell	6–4, 1–6, 7–5

=== Doubles 15 (8–7) ===
Legend
Challengers 0 (0–0)
Futures 15 (8–7)

Result	No.	Date	Tournament	Surface	Partner	Opponents	Score
Loss	1.	March 9, 2014	Cherkasy, Ukraine F1	Hard (i)	(Latvia) Jānis Podžus	(Ukraine) Vladyslav Manafov (Croatia) Filip Veger	2–6, 5–7
Win	2.	December 7, 2014	Antalya, Turkey F43	Hard	(Latvia) Jānis Podžus	(Portugal) Romain Barbosa (Portugal) Frederico Ferreira Silva	4–6, 6–3, [10–7]
Loss	3.	December 14, 2014	Antalya, Turkey F44	Hard	(Latvia) Jānis Podžus	(Romania) Bogdan Ionuț Apostol (Lithuania) Lukas Mugevičius	4–6, 6–4, [11–13]
Win	4.	April 19, 2015	Sharm El Sheikh, Egypt F14	Hard	(Latvia) Jānis Podžus	(Austria) Martin Fischer (Switzerland) Jannis Liniger	6–0, 0–6, [10–7]
Loss	5.	October 4, 2015	Hambach, Germany F14	Carpet (i)	(Latvia) Jānis Podžus	(Germany) Johannes Härteis (Germany) Hannes Wagner	6–7^{(5–7)}, 6–7^{(4–7)}
Loss	6.	October 18, 2015	Bad Salzdetfurth, Germany F16	Carpet (i)	(Latvia) Jānis Podžus	(Czech Republic) Petr Michnev (Czech Republic) Pavel Nejedlý	4–6, 2–6
Win	7.	May 13, 2018	Wisła, Poland F2	Clay	(United States) Patrick Daciek	(Russia) Timur Kiyamov (Russia) Maxim Ratniuk	6–4, 4–6, [10–7]
Win	8.	October 6, 2018	Falun, Sweden F5	Hard (i)	(Latvia) Jānis Podžus	(Switzerland) Antoine Bellier (Germany) Johannes Härteis	6–1, 6–2
Win	9.	November 10, 2018	Pärnu, Estonia F3	Hard (i)	(Latvia) Jānis Podžus	(Estonia) Vladimir Ivanov (Russia) Maxim Ratniuk	6–3, 6–4
Win	10.	June 2, 2019	M25 Kiseljak, Bosnia and Herzegovina	Clay	(Russia) Maxim Ratniuk	(Argentina) Francisco Cerúndolo (Brazil) João Pedro Sorgi	7–6^{(7–5)}, 6–2
Win	11.	July 21, 2019	M15 Piešťany, Slovakia	Clay	(Latvia) Jānis Podžus	(Czech Republic) Vít Kopřiva (Czech Republic) Petr Nouza	6–7^{(3–7)}, 7–6^{(7–1)}, [10–7]
Win	12.	August 11, 2019	M15 Koszalin, Poland	Clay	(Latvia) Jānis Podžus	(Germany) Hasan Ibrahim (Germany) Timo Stodder	7–6^{(9–7)}, 5–7, [10–5]
Loss	13.	October 6, 2019	M25 Falun, Sweden	Hard (i)	(Latvia) Jānis Podžus	(France) Florian Lakat (Poland) Jan Zieliński	6–7^{(5–7)}, 1–6
Loss	14.	October 11, 2020	M15 Sharm El Sheikh, Egypt	Hard	(Ukraine) Yurii Dzhavakian	(Ukraine) Vladyslav Manafov (Ukraine) Vitaliy Sachko	3–6, 3–6
Loss	15.	February 21, 2021	M15 Sharm El Sheikh, Egypt	Hard	(Germany) Robert Strombachs	(Chinese Taipei) Hsu Yu-hsiou (Japan) Jumpei Yamasaki	3–6, 7–5, [7–10]

== Davis Cup ==
=== Participations: (19–16) ===
Group membership World Group (0–0) WG Play-off (0–0) Group I (2–2) Group II (9–10) Group III (8–4) Group IV (0–0)	Matches by surface Hard (6–8) Clay (13–8) Grass (0–0) Carpet (0–0)	Matches by type Singles (12–12) Doubles (7–4)

- ▲ ▼ indicates the outcome of the Davis Cup match followed by the score, date, place of event, the zonal classification and its phase, and the court surface.

Rubber outcome	No.	Rubber	Match type (partner if any)	Opponent nation	Opponent player(s)	Score
▼2–3; 8–10 July 2011; KB Pile Alle, Frederiksberg, Denmark; Europe/Africa Second round; Clay surface
Defeat	1	II	Singles	Denmark	Frederik Nielsen	6–0, 6–1, 5–7, 3–6, 0–6
Defeat	2	V	Singles	Denmark	Martin Pedersen	2–6, 4–6, 1–6
▲3–2; 10–12 February 2012; El Gezera Sporting Club, Cairo, Egypt; Europe/Africa First round; Clay surface
Defeat	3	V	Singles (dead rubber)	Egypt	Karim-Mohamed Maamoun	2–6, 6–3, 4–6
▲3–2; 13–15 September 2013; Arēna Rīga, Riga, Latvia; Europe/Africa Promotional Play-off; Hard (indoor) surface
Defeat	4	V	Singles (dead rubber)	Finland	Herkko Pöllänen	4–6, 4–6
▼0–5; 31 January – 2 February 2014; Aegon Arena, Bratislava, Slovakia; Europe/Africa First round; Hard (indoor) surface
Defeat	5	I	Singles	Slovakia	Lukáš Lacko	6–3, 3–6, 3–6, 1–6
▼2–3; 24–26 October 2014; Racketcentrum, Jönköping, Sweden; Europe/Africa Relegation play-off; Hard (indoor) surface
Victory	6	I	Singles	Sweden	Elias Ymer	7–6^{(7–3)}, 7–5, 6–7^{(5–7)}, 3–6, 9–7
Defeat	7	III	Doubles (with Miķelis Lībietis)	Sweden	Johan Brunström / Robert Lindstedt	4–6, 2–6, 6–3, 6–4, 3–6
Victory	8	IV	Singles	Sweden	Christian Lindell	6–4, 6–7^{(3–7)}, 6–4, 6–2
▼1–4; 6–8 March 2015; Tenisa Centrs Lielupe, Jūrmala, Latvia; Europe/Africa First round; Hard (indoor) surface
Victory	9	I	Singles	Bulgaria	Alexandar Lazov	6–3, 7–5, 7–5
Defeat	10	III	Doubles (with Jānis Podžus)	Bulgaria	Tihomir Grozdanov / Ilia Kushev	6–3, 6–2, 4–6, 5–7, 1–6
Defeat	11	IV	Singles	Bulgaria	Dimitar Kuzmanov	6–7^{(6–8)}, 7–5, 2–6, 4–6
▲3–2; 17–19 July 2015; Liepajas Tenisa Sporta Skola, Liepāja, Latvia; Europe/Africa Relegation play-off; Clay surface
Victory	12	I	Singles	Madagascar	Jacob Rasolondrazana	6–1, 6–2, 7–6^{(7–5)}
Victory	13	III	Doubles (with Miķelis Lībietis)	Madagascar	Tony Rajaobelina / Antso Rakotondramanga	6–1, 6–4, 6–2
Victory	14	IV	Singles	Madagascar	Antso Rakotondramanga	2–6, 6–2, 4–6, 7–6^{(8–6)}, 6–4
▲3–2; 4–6 March 2016; Daugavpils Olimpiskais Centrs, Daugavpils, Latvia; Europe/Africa First round; Hard (indoor) surface
Victory	15	I	Singles	Monaco	Romain Arneodo	7–6^{(7–5)}, 6–4, 7–6^{(8–6)}
Victory	16	III	Doubles (with Miķelis Lībietis)	Monaco	Romain Arneodo / Benjamin Balleret	6–3, 6–2, 7–5
Defeat	–	V	Singles	Monaco	Benjamin Balleret	WO *
▼1–4; 15–17 July 2016; National Olympic Training Centre, Minsk, Belarus; Europe/Africa Second round; Hard surface
Defeat	17	I	Singles	Belarus	Ilya Ivashka	4–6, 2–6, 5–7
Victory	18	III	Doubles (with Miķelis Lībietis)	Belarus	Aliaksandr Bury / Andrei Vasilevski	3–6, 6–3, 6–4, 7–6^{(7–2)}
▼0–5; 3–5 February 2017; Olympic Sports Center of Zemgale, Jelgava, Latvia; Europe/Africa First round; Hard (indoor) surface
Defeat	19	I	Singles	Norway	Casper Ruud	3–6, 1–6, 5–7
Defeat	20	III	Doubles (with Miķelis Lībietis)	Norway	Viktor Durasovic / Casper Ruud	3–6, 6–7^{(2–7)}, 7–6^{(7–5)}, 2–6
▼2–3; 7–9 April 2017; Royal Tennis Club de Marrakesh, Marrakesh, Morocco; Europe/Africa Relegation Play-Off; Clay surface
Defeat	21	II	Singles	Morocco	Reda El Amrani	4–6, 6–7^{(8–10)}, 4–6
Victory	22	III	Doubles (with Miķelis Lībietis)	Morocco	Amine Ahouda / Reda El Amrani	4–6, 7–6^{(7–5)}, 7–6^{(7–4)}, 6–3
Victory	23	V	Singles	Morocco	Amine Ahouda	6–1 ret.
▼1–2; 4 April 2018; Ulcinj Bellevue, Ulcinj, Montenegro; Europe Round Robin; Clay surface
Defeat	24	II	Singles	Greece	Markos Kalovelonis	3–6, 4–6
Victory	25	III	Doubles (with Artūrs Lazdiņš)	Greece	Markos Kalovelonis / Ioannis Stergiou	7–5, 6–3
▼1–2; 5 April 2018; Ulcinj Bellevue, Ulcinj, Montenegro; Europe Round Robin; Clay surface
Defeat	26	II	Singles	Montenegro	Ljubomir Čelebić	4–6, 5–7
▲2–1; 6 April 2018; Ulcinj Bellevue, Ulcinj, Montenegro; Europe Round Robin; Clay surface
Victory	27	II	Singles	Armenia	Sedrak Khachatryan	6–0, 6–1
▲3–0; 7 April 2018; Ulcinj Bellevue, Ulcinj, Montenegro; Europe 5th-6th place Play-Off; Clay surface
Victory	28	II	Singles	Liechtenstein	Vital Flurin Leuch	6–0, 6–4
Victory	29	III	Doubles (with Roberts Grīnvalds)	Liechtenstein	Robin Forster / Vital Flurin Leuch	6–1, 6–3
▲3–0; 11 September 2019; Tatoi Club, Athens, Greece; Europe Zone Group III Pool B Round Robin; Clay surface
Victory	30	II	Singles	Montenegro	Ljubomir Čelebić	6–4, 6–3
▲2–0; 12 September 2019; Tatoi Club, Athens, Greece; Europe Zone Group III Pool B Round Robin; Clay surface
Victory	31	II	Singles	North Macedonia	Gorazd Srbljak	6–1, 6–2
▼1–2; 13 September 2019; Tatoi Club, Athens, Greece; Europe Zone Group III Pool B Round Robin; Clay surface
Victory	32	II	Singles	Estonia	Jürgen Zopp	6–1, 7–6^{(7–5)}
Defeat	33	III	Doubles (with Jānis Podžus)	Estonia	Jürgen Zopp / Kenneth Raisma	6–7^{(8–10)}, 4–6
▼1–2; 14 September 2019; Tatoi Club, Athens, Greece; Europe Zone Group III 3rd-4th playoff; Clay surface
Defeat	34	II	Singles	Greece	Stefanos Tsitsipas	4–6, 4–6
Victory	35	III	Doubles (with Robert Strombachs)	Greece	Markos Kalovelonis / Petros Tsitsipas	6–4, 6–0

* Walkover doesn't count in his overall record.
