= Julius Tverijonas =

Lithuanian tennis player (born 1994)

- Country (sports): Lithuania
- Born: 14 June 1994 (age 31) Šiauliai, Lithuania
- Height: 1.88 m (6 ft 2 in)
- Plays: Right-handed (two-handed backhand)
- Prize money: $17,082

Singles
- Career record: 0–2
- Highest ranking: No. 776 (23 September 2019)

Doubles
- Career record: 0–1
- Career titles: 0; 0 Challenger, 1 Futures
- Highest ranking: No. 904 (23 September 2019)

Team competitions
- Davis Cup: 0–4

Julius Tverijonas (born 14 June 1994) is a Lithuanian tennis player and a member of Lithuania Davis Cup team. Tverijonas reached his highest singles ranking of No. 776 in the world on ATP circuit on 23 September 2019 and also No. 88 in the world on ITF junior circuit on 13 February 2012.

== Personal ==
Tverijonas played collegiate tennis at George Washington University (2013–2017), compiling a 67–35 record in singles, and was a 2017 Arthur Ashe, Jr. Sports Scholar. After some time on the professional circuit he completed a postgraduate degree at Durham University (2019–2020), where he won the 2019 BUCS Men's Doubles Championships alongside Or Ram-Harel of Israel, the pair defeating fellow Durham students Henry Patten and Josep Krstanovic in the final.

== Future and Challenger finals ==
=== Singles: 1 (0–1) ===
Legend
ATP Challengers 0 (0–0)
ITF World Tennis Tour 1 (0–1)

Result	W–L	Date	Tournament	Surface	Opponent	Score
Loss	0–1	May 2019	M15 Kampala, Uganda	Clay	(Russia) Ivan Nedelko	1–6, 4–6

=== Doubles 4 (1–3) ===
Legend
ATP Challengers 0 (0–0)
ITF Futures/World Tennis Tour 4 (1–3)

Result	W–L	Date	Tournament	Surface	Partner	Opponents	Score
Win	1–0	May 2015	Antalya, Turkey F20	Hard	(Bolivia) Federico Zeballos	(France) Constantin Belot (France) Nicolas Rosenzweig	6–3, 6–3
Loss	1–1	May 2017	Antalya, Turkey F20	Clay	(Bolivia) Hugo Dellien	(Spain) Sergio Martos Gornés (Spain) David Pérez Sanz	5–7, 4–6
Loss	1–2	Oct 2018	Herzliya, Israel F12	Hard	(Israel) Alon Elia	(Switzerland) Luca Castelnuovo (Argentina) Matías Franco Descotte	6–1, 2–6, [7–10]
Loss	1–3	Aug 2019	M15 Sintra, Portugal	Hard	(United Kingdom) Stuart Parker	(Republic of Ireland) Peter Bothwell (France) Maxime Tchoutakian	3–6, 2–6

== Davis Cup ==
=== Participations: (0–5) ===
Group membership World Group (0–0) WG play-off (0–0) Group I (0–1) Group II (0–4) Group III (0–0) Group IV (0–0)	Matches by surface Hard (0–1) Clay (0–4) Grass (0–0) Carpet (0–0)	Matches by type Singles (0–4) Doubles (0–1)

- ▲ ▼ indicates the outcome of the Davis Cup match followed by the score, date, place of event, the zonal classification and its phase, and the court surface.

Rubber outcome	No.	Rubber	Match type (partner if any)	Opponent nation	Opponent player(s)	Score
▼0–5; 8-10 July 2011; Sereikiskiai Tennis Courts, Vilnius, Lithuania; Europe/Africa Zone Group II relegation play-off; clay surface
Defeat	1	IV	Singles	Morocco	Hicham Khaddari	4–6, 3–6
▼0–5; 15-17 September 2017; Båstad Tennis Stadium, Båstad, Sweden; Europe/Africa Zone Group II promotional play-off; clay surface
Defeat	2	I	Singles	Sweden	Elias Ymer	2–6, 3–6, 4–6
Defeat	3	V	Singles (dead rubber)	Sweden	Mikael Ymer	5–7, 3–6
▲3–2; 5–6 April 2019; Royal Tennis Club de Marrakech, Marrakesh, Morocco; Europe/Africa Zone Group II first round; clay surface
Defeat	4	III	Doubles (with Laurynas Grigelis)	Morocco	Anas Fattar / Lamine Ouahab	6–2, 3–6, 2–6
▼0–4; 6-7 March 2020; Siauliai Tennis Academy, Šiauliai, Lithuania; World Group I play-off first round; clay surface
Defeat	5	II	Singles	Portugal	João Sousa	1–6, 3–6
