= Tadas Babelis =

Lithuanian tennis player (born 1997)

- Country (sports): Lithuania
- Born: 25 February 1997 (age 28); Vilnius, Lithuania
- Height: 1.85 m (6 ft 1 in)
- College: NC State
- Prize money: $7,688

Singles
- Career record: 0–6 (at ATP Tour level, Grand Slam level, and in Davis Cup)
- Career titles: 0 ITF
- Highest ranking: No. 1,316 (1 May 2017)

Doubles
- Career record: 1–1 (at ATP Tour level, Grand Slam level, and in Davis Cup)
- Career titles: 2 ITF
- Highest ranking: No. 803 (29 October 2018)
- Current ranking: No. 1,038 (22 February 2021)

Team competitions
- Davis Cup: 1–7
- Last updated on: 22 February 2021.

Tadas Babelis (born 25 February 1997) is a Lithuanian tennis player.

Babelis has a career high ATP singles ranking of 1316 achieved on 1 May 2017. He also has a career high ATP doubles ranking of 803 achieved on 29 October 2018.

Babelis represents Lithuania at the Davis Cup, where he has a W/L record of 1–7.

== Future and Challenger finals ==
=== Doubles 2 (2–0) ===
Legend (doubles) ATP Challenger Tour (0–0) ITF Futures Tour (2–0)	Titles by surface Hard (0–0) Clay (2–0) Grass (0–0) Carpet (0–0)

Result	W–L	Date	Tournament	Tier	Surface	Partner	Opponents	Score
Win	1–0	Jul 2018	Georgia F2, Telavi	Futures	Clay	(Russia) Ronald Slobodchikov	(Argentina) Nicolás Alberto Arreche (Argentina) Franco Feitt	7–6^{(7–5)}, 7–6^{(7–5)}
Win	2–0	Aug 2018	Latvia F1, Riga	Futures	Clay	(Lithuania) Kasparas Žemaitėlis	(Latvia) Roberts Grīnvalds (Latvia) Rūdolfs Mednis	6–4, 3–6, [10–1]

== Davis Cup ==
=== Participations: (1–7) ===
Group membership World Group (0–0) WG Play-off (0–0) Group I (0–1) Group II (1–6) Group III (0–0) Group IV (0–0)	Matches by surface Hard (1–4) Clay (0–3) Grass (0–0) Carpet (0–0)	Matches by type Singles (0–6) Doubles (1–1)

- ▲ ▼ indicates the outcome of the Davis Cup match followed by the score, date, place of event, the zonal classification and its phase, and the court surface.

Rubber outcome	No.	Rubber	Match type (partner if any)	Opponent nation	Opponent player(s)	Score
▼0–5; 30 October – 1 November 2015; Teniski klub Triglav Kranj, Kranj, Slovenia; Europe/Africa Zone Group I Relegation play-off; Hard (i) surface
Defeat	1	V	Singles (dead rubber)	Slovenia	Tom Kočevar-Dešman	2–6, 6–2, 4–6
▲3–2; 15–17 July 2016; Azuolynas Tennis Centre, Kaunas, Lithuania; Europe/Africa Zone Group II Second round; Clay surface
Defeat	2	V	Singles (dead rubber)	South Africa	Tucker Vorster	3–6, 2–6
▼0–5; 16–18 September 2016; Siemens Arena, Vilnius, Lithuania; Europe/Africa Zone Group II Promotional play-off; Hard (i) surface
Defeat	3	IV	Singles (dead rubber)	Bosnia and Herzegovina	Tomislav Brkić	4–6, 6–3, 2–6
▲3–2; 3–5 February 2017; Šiauliai Tennis School, Šiauliai, Lithuania; Europe/Africa Zone Group II First round; Hard (indoor) surface
Defeat	4	II	Singles	Madagascar	Antso Rakotondramanga	4–6, 4–6, 3–6
Victory	5	III	Doubles (with Laurynas Grigelis)	Madagascar	Jean-Jacques Rakotohasy / Antso Rakotondramanga	6–2, 6–4, 6–4
▲3–2; 7–9 April 2017; Mziuri Tennis Club, Tbilisi, Georgia; Europe/Africa Zone Group II Second round; Hard surface
Defeat	6	I	Singles	(Georgia (country)) Georgia	Nikoloz Basilashvili	3–6, 2–6, 0–6
▼0–5; 15–17 September 2017; Båstad Tennis Stadium, Båstad, Sweden; Europe/Africa Zone Group II Promotional play-off; Clay surface
Defeat	7	III	Doubles (with Laurynas Grigelis)	Sweden	Johan Brunström / Markus Eriksson	6–7^{(2–7)}, 3–6, 1–6
Defeat	8	IV	Singles (dead rubber)	Sweden	Markus Eriksson	3–6, 0–6
