= 2017 Davis Cup Europe/Africa Zone Group II =

International tennis competition

The Europe/Africa Zone was one of the three zones of the regional Davis Cup competition in 2017.

In the Europe/Africa Zone there were three different tiers, called groups, in which teams competed against each other to advance to the upper tier. Winners in Group II advanced to the Europe/Africa Zone Group I. Teams who lost their respective ties competed in the relegation play-offs, with winning teams remaining in Group II, whereas European and African teams who lost their play-offs were relegated respectively to the Europe and Africa Zone Group III in 2018.

== Participating nations ==
Seeds:

1. Sweden
2. Slovenia
3. Lithuania
4. Denmark
5. Finland
6. Latvia
7. Turkey
8. South Africa

Remaining nations:

- Cyprus
- Estonia
- Georgia
- Madagascar
- Monaco
- Morocco
- Norway
- Tunisia

=== Draw ===
Relegation Play-offs
Nicosia, Cyprus (hard)
Tunisia	4
Cyprus	1
Hanko, Finland (indoor hard)
Madagascar	2
5	Finland	3
Marrakesh, Morocco (clay)
6	Latvia	2
Morocco	3
Tallinn, Estonia (indoor hard)
Estonia	3
Monaco	2

First Round
Tunis, Tunisia (hard)
1	Sweden	3
Tunisia	2
Nicosia, Cyprus (hard)
7	Turkey	4
Cyprus	1
Šiauliai, Lithuania (indoor hard)
3	Lithuania	3
Madagascar	2
Tbilisi, Georgia (indoor carpet)
5	Finland	2
Georgia	3
Jelgava, Latvia (indoor hard)
Norway	5
6	Latvia	0
Aarhus, Denmark (indoor carpet)
Morocco	1
4	Denmark	4
Centurion, South Africa (hard)
Estonia	1
8	South Africa	4
Maribor, Slovenia (indoor hard)
Monaco	2
2	Slovenia	3

Second Round
Antalya, Turkey (clay)
1	Sweden	4
7	Turkey	1
Tbilisi, Georgia (hard)
3	Lithuania	3
Georgia	2
Stavanger, Norway (indoor hard)
Norway	1
4	Denmark	4
Centurion, South Africa (hard)
8	South Africa	5
2	Slovenia	0

Third Round
Båstad, Sweden (clay)
1	Sweden	5
3	Lithuania	0
Aarhus, Denmark (indoor hard)
4	Denmark	1
8	South Africa	3

- Cyprus, Madagascar, Latvia, and Monaco relegated to Group III in 2018.
- Sweden and South Africa promoted to Group I in 2018.

== First round ==
=== Tunisia vs. Sweden ===
Tunisia
2
Tennis courts of Cité Nationale Sportive El Menzah, Tunis, Tunisia
3–5 February 2017
Hard

Sweden
3

			1	2	3	4	5
1	(Tunisia) (Sweden)	Malek Jaziri; Isak Arvidsson	6; 4	7; 5	6; 2
2	(Tunisia) (Sweden)	Mohamed Aziz Dougaz; Patrik Rosenholm	6^{4} 7^{7}	3; 6	6; 3	6; 4	3; 6
3	(Tunisia) (Sweden)	Anis Ghorbel / Malek Jaziri; Johan Brunström / Andreas Siljeström	3; 6	5; 7	6^{4} 7^{7}
4	(Tunisia) (Sweden)	Malek Jaziri; Patrik Rosenholm	6; 3	6; 3	6; 1
5	(Tunisia) (Sweden)	Mohamed Aziz Dougaz; Isak Arvidsson	7^{9} 6^{7}	2; 6	1; 6	6; 3	3; 6

=== Cyprus vs. Turkey ===
Cyprus
1
National Tennis Centre, Nicosia, Cyprus
3–5 February 2017
Hard

Turkey
4

			1	2	3	4	5
1	(Cyprus) (Turkey)	Petros Chrysochos; Cem İlkel	7^{7} 6^{4}	6; 3	3; 6	0; 6	4; 6
2	(Cyprus) (Turkey)	Menelaos Efstathiou; Marsel İlhan	7; 5	6; 1	4; 6	6^{5} 7^{7}	4; 6
3	(Cyprus) (Turkey)	Petros Chrysochos / Eleftherios Neos; Altuğ Çelikbilek / Cem İlkel	3; 6	5; 7	7^{7} 6^{3}	6; 4	6; 1
4	(Cyprus) (Turkey)	Petros Chrysochos; Marsel İlhan	7; 5	5; 7	6^{2} 7^{7}	4; 6
5	(Cyprus) (Turkey)	Nicholas Campbell; Altuğ Çelikbilek	3; 6	6^{1} 7^{7}

=== Lithuania vs. Madagascar ===
Lithuania
3
Šiauliai Tennis School, Šiauliai, Lithuania
3–5 February 2017
Hard (i)

Madagascar
2

			1	2	3	4	5
1	(Lithuania) (Madagascar)	Laurynas Grigelis; Lucas Andriamasilalao	6; 1	6; 2	6; 4
2	(Lithuania) (Madagascar)	Tadas Babelis; Antso Rakotondramanga	4; 6	4; 6	3; 6
3	(Lithuania) (Madagascar)	Tadas Babelis / Laurynas Grigelis; Jean-Jacques Rakotohasy / Antso Rakotondramanga	6; 2	6; 4	6; 4
4	(Lithuania) (Madagascar)	Laurynas Grigelis; Antso Rakotondramanga	6; 4	7^{8} 6^{6}	6; 4
5	(Lithuania) (Madagascar)	Tomas Vaišė; Jean-Jacques Rakotohasy	3; 6	6; 4	2; 6

=== Georgia vs. Finland ===
Georgia
3
New Sport Hall, Tbilisi, Georgia
3–5 February 2017
Carpet (i)

Finland
2

			1	2	3	4	5
1	(Georgia (country)) (Finland)	Nikoloz Basilashvili; Eero Vasa	2; 6	6; 1	6; 4	6; 1
2	(Georgia (country)) (Finland)	George Tsivadze; Harri Heliövaara	5; 7	2; 6	1; 6
3	(Georgia (country)) (Finland)	Nikoloz Basilashvili / George Tsivadze; Harri Heliövaara / Patrik Niklas-Salminen	4; 6	0; 6	3; 6
4	(Georgia (country)) (Finland)	Nikoloz Basilashvili; Emil Ruusuvuori	6; 2	6; 4	6; 4
5	(Georgia (country)) (Finland)	George Tsivadze; Patrik Niklas-Salminen	6; 4	7; 5	5; 7	0; 6	7^{7} 6^{5}

=== Latvia vs. Norway ===
Latvia
0
Olympic Sports Center of Zemgale, Jelgava, Latvia
3–5 February 2017
Hard (i)

Norway
5

			1	2	3	4	5
1	(Latvia) (Norway)	Mārtiņš Podžus; Casper Ruud	3; 6	1; 6	5; 7
2	(Latvia) (Norway)	Miķelis Lībietis; Viktor Durasovic	7^{7} 6^{5}	4; 6	1; 6	6^{3} 7^{7}
3	(Latvia) (Norway)	Miķelis Lībietis / Mārtiņš Podžus; Viktor Durasovic / Casper Ruud	3; 6	6^{2} 7^{7}	7^{7} 6^{5}	2; 6
4	(Latvia) (Norway)	Rūdolfs Mednis; Simen Sunde Bratholm	7; 5	6^{5} 7^{7}	6^{6} 7^{8}
5	(Latvia) (Norway)	Artūrs Lazdiņš; Viktor Durasovic						w/o

=== Denmark vs. Morocco ===
Denmark
4
Vejlby-Risskov Hallen, Aarhus, Denmark
3–5 February 2017
Carpet (i)

Morocco
1

			1	2	3	4	5
1	(Denmark) (Morocco)	Frederik Nielsen; Amine Ahouda	6; 1	6; 3	6; 3
2	(Denmark) (Morocco)	Søren Hess-Olesen; Reda El Amrani	2; 6	6; 3	2; 6	6^{5} 7^{7}
3	(Denmark) (Morocco)	Thomas Kromann / Frederik Nielsen; Reda El Amrani / Yassine Idmbarek	6; 2	6; 4	6; 2
4	(Denmark) (Morocco)	Frederik Nielsen; Reda El Amrani	6; 2	3; 6	6; 3	6; 4
5	(Denmark) (Morocco)	Søren Hess-Olesen; Mehdi Jdi	3; 6	6; 0	6; 0

=== South Africa vs. Estonia ===
South Africa
4
Irene Country Club, Centurion, South Africa
3–5 February 2017
Hard

Estonia
1

			1	2	3	4	5
1	(South Africa) (Estonia)	Nicolaas Scholtz; Jürgen Zopp	4; 6	6; 4	6; 3	0; 0		retired
2	(South Africa) (Estonia)	Lloyd Harris; Vladimir Ivanov	6; 4	6; 3	6; 2
3	(South Africa) (Estonia)	Raven Klaasen / Ruan Roelofse; Kenneth Raisma / Mattias Siimar	6^{4} 7^{7}	6; 3	6; 4	7; 5
4	(South Africa) (Estonia)	Lloyd Harris; Mattias Siimar	7; 5	6; 3
5	(South Africa) (Estonia)	Nicolaas Scholtz; Vladimir Ivanov	6^{3} 7^{7}	3; 6

=== Slovenia vs. Monaco ===
Slovenia
3
Zeleznicarski Teniski Klub Maribor, Maribor, Slovenia
3–5 February 2017
Hard (i)

Monaco
2

			1	2	3	4	5
1	(Slovenia) (Monaco)	Blaž Kavčič; Lucas Catarina	6; 4	2; 6	6; 2	6; 4
2	(Slovenia) (Monaco)	Grega Žemlja; Romain Arneodo	6; 3	6; 4	6^{5} 7^{7}	6; 4
3	(Slovenia) (Monaco)	Blaž Kavčič / Grega Žemlja; Romain Arneodo / Benjamin Balleret	2; 6	4; 6	3; 6
4	(Slovenia) (Monaco)	Grega Žemlja; Lucas Catarina	6; 2	6; 3	6; 1
5	(Slovenia) (Monaco)	Tilen Žitnik; Thomas Oger	6; 1	4; 6	2; 6

== Second round ==
=== Turkey vs. Sweden ===
Turkey
1
Ali Bey Hotels & Resorts, Antalya, Turkey
7–9 April
Clay

Sweden
4

			1	2	3	4	5
1	(Turkey) (Sweden)	Marsel İlhan; Christian Lindell	1; 6	4; 6	4; 6
2	(Turkey) (Sweden)	Cem İlkel; Elias Ymer	6; 4	3; 6	7^{8} 6^{6}	6^{3} 7^{7}	3; 6
3	(Turkey) (Sweden)	Altuğ Çelikbilek / Cem İlkel; Johan Brunström / Andreas Siljeström	6^{5} 7^{7}	6; 4	6; 4	6; 3
4	(Turkey) (Sweden)	Altuğ Çelikbilek; Elias Ymer	6^{6} 7^{8}	1; 6	5; 7
5	(Turkey) (Sweden)	Anıl Yüksel; Christian Lindell	3; 6	7; 5	1; 6

=== Georgia vs. Lithuania ===
Georgia
2
Mziuri Tennis Club, Tbilisi, Georgia
7–9 April
Hard

Lithuania
3

			1	2	3	4	5
1	(Georgia (country)) (Lithuania)	Nikoloz Basilashvili; Tadas Babelis	6; 3	6; 2	6; 0
2	(Georgia (country)) (Lithuania)	George Tsivadze; Laurynas Grigelis	3; 6	2; 6	2; 6
3	(Georgia (country)) (Lithuania)	Nikoloz Basilashvili / George Tsivadze; Laurynas Grigelis / Lukas Mugevičius	4; 6	3; 6	3; 6
4	(Georgia (country)) (Lithuania)	Nikoloz Basilashvili; Laurynas Grigelis	6; 0	6; 1	6; 0
5	(Georgia (country)) (Lithuania)	George Tsivadze; Lukas Mugevičius	4; 6	2; 6	6; 1	4; 6

=== Norway vs. Denmark ===
Norway
1
Stavanger Forum Expo, Stavanger, Norway
7–9 April
Hard (i)

Denmark
4

			1	2	3	4	5
1	(Norway) (Denmark)	Casper Ruud; Søren Hess-Olesen	6; 3	5; 7	7; 5	6; 2
2	(Norway) (Denmark)	Viktor Durasovic; Frederik Nielsen	2; 6	6; 3	2; 6	6^{7} 7^{9}
3	(Norway) (Denmark)	Viktor Durasovic / Casper Ruud; Thomas Kromann / Frederik Nielsen	4; 6	6; 4	2; 6	2; 6
4	(Norway) (Denmark)	Casper Ruud; Frederik Nielsen	4; 6	2; 6	3; 6
5	(Norway) (Denmark)	Simen Sunde Bratholm; August Holmgren	6^{4} 7^{7}	5; 7

=== South Africa vs. Slovenia ===
South Africa
5
Irene Country Club, Centurion, South Africa
7–9 April
Hard

Slovenia
0

			1	2	3	4	5
1	(South Africa) (Slovenia)	Lloyd Harris; Mike Urbanija	6; 1	6; 1	6; 2
2	(South Africa) (Slovenia)	Nicolaas Scholtz; Grega Žemlja	3; 6	6^{1} 7^{7}	7^{8} 6^{6}	7^{7} 6^{4}	7^{9} 6^{7}
3	(South Africa) (Slovenia)	Raven Klaasen / Ruan Roelofse; Tomislav Ternar / Grega Žemlja	7^{8} 6^{6}	6; 2	6; 4
4	(South Africa) (Slovenia)	Lloyd Harris; Tilen Žitnik	6; 3	6; 3
5	(South Africa) (Slovenia)	Nicolaas Scholtz; Tomislav Ternar	6; 2	6; 4

== Play-offs ==
=== Cyprus vs. Tunisia ===
Cyprus
1
National Tennis Centre, Nicosia, Cyprus
7–9 April
Hard

Tunisia
4

			1	2	3	4	5
1	(Cyprus) (Tunisia)	Menelaos Efstathiou; Malek Jaziri	2; 6	3; 6	5; 7
2	(Cyprus) (Tunisia)	Marcos Baghdatis; Moez Echargui	5; 7	6^{2} 7^{7}	6; 4	6; 4	1; 6
3	(Cyprus) (Tunisia)	Marcos Baghdatis / Petros Chrysochos; Malek Jaziri / Skander Mansouri	5; 7	6; 3	7; 5	4; 6	5; 7
4	(Cyprus) (Tunisia)	Petros Chrysochos; Aziz Dougaz	6; 4	7^{7} 6^{2}
5	(Cyprus) (Tunisia)	Eleftherios Neos; Moez Echargui	3; 6	2; 6

=== Finland vs. Madagascar ===
Finland
3
Hangon Urheilutalo, Hanko, Finland
7–9 April
Hard (i)

Madagascar
2

			1	2	3	4	5
1	(Finland) (Madagascar)	Patrik Niklas-Salminen; Jean-Jacques Rakotohasy	6; 2	6; 4	6; 3
2	(Finland) (Madagascar)	Eero Vasa; Antso Rakotondramanga	6; 4	3; 6	2; 6	0; 6
3	(Finland) (Madagascar)	Harri Heliövaara / Henri Kontinen; Antso Rakotondramanga / Lofo Ramiaramanana	6; 1	6; 2	6; 1
4	(Finland) (Madagascar)	Patrik Niklas-Salminen; Antso Rakotondramanga	3; 6	5; 7	6^{3} 7^{7}
5	(Finland) (Madagascar)	Harri Heliövaara; Lucas Andriamasilalao	6; 2	6; 1	6; 1

=== Morocco vs. Latvia ===
Morocco
3
Royal Tennis Club de Marrakech, Marrakesh, Morocco
7–9 April
Clay

Latvia
2

			1	2	3	4	5
1	(Morocco) (Latvia)	Amine Ahouda; Miķelis Lībietis	6; 3	4; 6	6; 3	6; 2
2	(Morocco) (Latvia)	Reda El Amrani; Mārtiņš Podžus	6; 4	7^{10} 6^{8}	6; 4
3	(Morocco) (Latvia)	Amine Ahouda / Reda El Amrani; Miķelis Lībietis / Mārtiņš Podžus	6; 4	6^{5} 7^{7}	6^{4} 7^{7}	3; 6
4	(Morocco) (Latvia)	Reda El Amrani; Rūdolfs Mednis	6; 2	6; 2	6; 3
5	(Morocco) (Latvia)	Amine Ahouda; Mārtiņš Podžus	1; 6	0; 0				retired

=== Estonia vs. Monaco ===
Estonia
3
Tere Tennisekeskus, Tallinn, Estonia
7–9 April
Hard (i)

Monaco
2

			1	2	3	4	5
1	(Estonia) (Monaco)	Vladimir Ivanov; Romain Arneodo	7^{7} 6^{4}	7^{7} 6^{5}	1; 6	6; 4
2	(Estonia) (Monaco)	Kenneth Raisma; Lucas Catarina	6; 3	6; 0	6; 4
3	(Estonia) (Monaco)	Kenneth Raisma / Mattias Siimar; Romain Arneodo / Benjamin Balleret	4; 6	6; 1	6; 2	7^{9} 6^{7}
4	(Estonia) (Monaco)	Mattias Siimar; Lucas Catarina	4; 6	6; 4	6^{3} 7^{7}
5	(Estonia) (Monaco)	Kristofer Siimar; Thomas Oger	4; 6	4; 6

== Third round ==
=== Sweden vs. Lithuania ===
Sweden
5
Båstad Tennis Stadium, Båstad, Sweden
15–17 September
Clay

Lithuania
0

			1	2	3	4	5
1	(Sweden) (Lithuania)	Elias Ymer; Julius Tverijonas	6; 2	6; 3	6; 4
2	(Sweden) (Lithuania)	Mikael Ymer; Laurynas Grigelis	2; 6	7; 5	6; 0	0; 6	6; 1
3	(Sweden) (Lithuania)	Johan Brunström / Markus Eriksson; Tadas Babelis / Laurynas Grigelis	7^{7} 6^{2}	6; 3	6; 1
4	(Sweden) (Lithuania)	Markus Eriksson; Tadas Babelis	6; 3	6; 0
5	(Sweden) (Lithuania)	Mikael Ymer; Julius Tverijonas	7; 5	6; 3

=== Denmark vs. South Africa ===
Denmark
1
Ceres Arena, Aarhus, Denmark
15–17 September
Hard (indoor)

South Africa
3

			1	2	3	4	5
1	(Denmark) (South Africa)	Frederik Nielsen; Nicolaas Scholtz	6; 4	6; 2	6; 3
2	(Denmark) (South Africa)	Benjamin Hannestad; Lloyd Harris	6^{4} 7^{7}	0; 6	5; 7
3	(Denmark) (South Africa)	Thomas Kromann / Frederik Nielsen; Raven Klaasen / Ruan Roelofse	3; 6	0; 6	4; 6
4	(Denmark) (South Africa)	Frederik Nielsen; Lloyd Harris	1; 6	6; 1	4; 6	3; 6
5	(Denmark) (South Africa)	Benjamin Hannestad; Nicolaas Scholtz						not played
