= Portugal Davis Cup team =

National tennis team

Portugal
- Captain: Nuno Marques
- Coach: Emanuel Couto
- ITF ranking: 28 (20 September 2021)
- Highest ITF ranking: 21 (10 April 2017)
- Colors: red & white
- First year: 1925
- Years played: 62
- Ties played (W–L): 106 (44–62)
- Years in World Group: 0
- Best finish: WG Play-Offs (1994, 2017)
- Most total wins: João Cunha e Silva (37–40)
- Most singles wins: João Cunha e Silva (25–28)
- Most doubles wins: Emanuel Couto (13–5)
- Best doubles team: Frederico Gil / Leonardo Tavares (9–5)
- Most ties played: João Cunha e Silva (30)
- Most years played: João Cunha e Silva (16); Nuno Marques (16)

The Portugal men's national tennis team represents Portugal in Davis Cup tennis competition and is governed by the Federação Portuguesa de Ténis.

Portugal competes in the Europe/Africa Zone Group I in 2017, after being promoted from Group II in the 2015 season. They have never played in the World Group, but reached the World Group play-offs in 1994 and 2017.

== History ==
Portugal competed in its first Davis Cup in 1925. Their first opponent was Italy, who won 4–1.

Portugal's most successful moment came in 1994 after defeating Great Britain 4–1 in the Group I of the Europe/Africa Zone and qualifying to the World Group play-offs. The team led by João Cunha e Silva, Nuno Marques and Emanuel Couto lost, however, to Croatia 4–0 (the last rubber was abandoned).

== Current team (2024) ==
- Nuno Borges (singles)
- João Sousa (singles)
- Henrique Rocha (singles)
- Gonçalo Oliveira (singles)
- Francisco Cabral (doubles)

== Recent performances ==
Here is the list of all match-ups since 1981, when the competition started being held in the current World Group format.

=== 1980s ===
Year	Competition	Date	Location	Opponent	Score	Result
1981	Europe Zone B, 1st round	8–10 May	Aarhus (DEN)	Denmark	0–5	Loss
1982	Europe Zone B, 1st round	7–9 May	Porto (POR)	Tunisia	5–0	Win
1982	Europe Zone B, Quarterfinals	11–13 June	Lisbon (POR)	Egypt	0–5	Loss
1983	Europe Zone A, 1st round	6–8 May	Estoril (POR)	Netherlands	1–4	Loss
1984	Europe Zone A, 1st round	4–6 May	Oslo (NOR)	Norway	1–4	Loss
1985	Europe Zone B, 1st round	10–12 May	Lisbon (POR)	Luxembourg	5–0	Win
1985	Europe Zone B, Quarterfinals	14–16 June	Nottingham (GBR)	Great Britain	0–5	Loss
1986	Europe Zone A, 1st round	9–11 May	Porto (POR)	Zimbabwe	3–2	Win
1986	Europe Zone A, Quarterfinals	13–15 June	Mayrhofen (AUT)	Austria	0–5	Loss
1987	Europe Zone B, 1st round	8–10 May	Monte Carlo (MON)	Monaco	3–2	Win
1987	Europe Zone B, Quarterfinals	12–14 June	Lisbon (POR)	Hungary	5–0	Win
1987	Europe Zone B, Semifinals	24–26 July	Porto (POR)	Austria	1–4	Loss
1988	Europe Zone Group I, Quarterfinals	6–8 May	Timișoara (ROM)	Romania	3–2	Win
1988	Europe Zone Group I, Semifinals	10–12 June	Lisbon (POR)	Soviet Union	0–5	Loss
1989	Europe/Africa Zone Group I, Quarterfinals	3–5 February	Porto (POR)	Senegal	5–0	Win
1989	Europe/Africa Zone Group I, Semifinals	5–7 May	Best (NED)	Netherlands	1–4	Loss

=== 1990s ===
Year	Competition	Date	Location	Opponent	Score	Result
1990	Europe/Africa Zone Group I, Quarterfinals	2–4 February	Accra (GHA)	Ghana	5–0	Win
1990	Europe/Africa Zone Group I, Semifinals	4–6 May	Kyiv (URS)	Soviet Union	1–4	Loss
1991	Europe/Africa Zone Group I, Quarterfinals	1–3 February	Porto (POR)	Ireland	5–0	Win
1991	Europe/Africa Zone Group I, Semifinals	3–5 May	Lisbon (POR)	Netherlands	1–4	Loss
1992	Europe/Africa Zone Group I, Semifinals	1–3 May	Porto (POR)	CIS	2–3	Loss
1993	Europe/Africa Zone Group I, Semifinals	30 April – 2 May	Lisbon (POR)	Israel	2–3	Loss
1994	Europe/Africa Zone Group I, Semifinals	25–27 March	Porto (POR)	Great Britain	4–1	Win
1994	World Group, Qualifying Round	23–25 September	Porto (POR)	Croatia	0–4	Loss
1995	Europe/Africa Zone Group I, Quarterfinals	31 March – 2 April	Budapest (HUN)	Hungary	2–3	Loss
1995	Europe/Africa Zone Group I, Relegation play-off	22–24 September	Estoril (POR)	Romania	2–3	Loss
1996	Europe/Africa Zone Group II, 1st round	1–3 May	Algiers (ALG)	Algeria	5–0	Win
1996	Europe/Africa Zone Group II, Quarterfinals	12–14 July	Trnava (SVK)	Slovakia	0–5	Loss
1997	Europe/Africa Zone Group II, 1st round	2–4 May	Cairo (EGY)	Egypt	5–0	Win
1997	Europe/Africa Zone Group II, Quarterfinals	11–13 July	Maia (POR)	Yugoslavia	3–2	Win
1997	Europe/Africa Zone Group II, Semifinals	19–21 September	Maia (POR)	Norway	2–3	Loss
1998	Europe/Africa Zone Group II, 1st round	1–3 May	Braga (POR)	Georgia	5–0	Win
1998	Europe/Africa Zone Group II, Quarterfinals	17–19 July	Belgrade (YUG)	Yugoslavia	3–2	Win
1998	Europe/Africa Zone Group II, Semifinals	25–27 September	Albufeira (POR)	Hungary	4–1	Win
1999	Europe/Africa Zone Group I, 1st round	12–14 February	Bye			
1999	Europe/Africa Zone Group I, Quarterfinals	2–4 April	Wels (AUT)	Austria	1–4	Loss
1999	Europe/Africa Zone Group I, Relegation play-off	25–27 September	Zagreb (CRO)	Croatia	4–1	Win

=== 2000s ===
Year	Competition	Date	Location	Opponent	Score	Result
2000	Europe/Africa Zone Group I, 1st round	4–6 February	Kyiv (UKR)	Ukraine	1–4	Loss
2000	Europe/Africa Zone Group I, Relegation play-off	6–8 October	Maia (POR)	South Africa	3–2	Win
2001	Europe/Africa Zone Group I, 1st round	9–11 February	Maia (POR)	Ukraine	3–2	Win
2001	Europe/Africa Zone Group I, Quarterfinals	6–8 April	Birmingham (GBR)	Great Britain	0–5	Loss
2002	Europe/Africa Zone Group I, 1st round	8–10 February	Harare (ZIM)	Zimbabwe	0–5	Loss
2002	Europe/Africa Zone Group I, Relegation play-off	12–14 July	Minsk (BLR)	Belarus	1–4	Loss
2002	Europe/Africa Zone Group I, Relegation play-off	20–22 September	Follonica (ITA)	Italy	1–4	Loss
2003	Europe/Africa Zone Group II, 1st Round	4–6 April	Maia (POR)	Monaco	4–1	Win
2003	Europe/Africa Zone Group II, 2nd round	11–13 July	Durban (SAF)	South Africa	0–5	Loss
2004	Europe/Africa Zone Group II, 1st round	9–11 April	Tunis (TUN)	Tunisia	3–2	Win
2004	Europe/Africa Zone Group II, 2nd round	16–18 July	Maia (POR)	Serbia and Montenegro	0–5	Loss
2005	Europe/Africa Zone Group II, 1st round	4–6 March	Tallinn (EST)	Estonia	4–1	Win
2005	Europe/Africa Zone Group II, 2nd round	15–17 July	Lisbon (POR)	Algeria	3–2	Win
2005	Europe/Africa Zone Group II, Finals	23–25 September	Estoril (POR)	Slovenia	4–1	Win
2006	Europe/Africa Zone Group I, 1st round	10–12 February	Esch-sur-Alzette (LUX)	Luxembourg	1–4	Loss
2006	Europe/Africa Zone Group I, Relegation play-off	22–24 September	Marrakesh (MAR)	Morocco	3–2	Win
2007	Europe/Africa Zone Group I, 1st round	9–11 February	Tbilisi (GEO)	Georgia	2–3	Loss
2007	Europe/Africa Zone Group I, Relegation play-off	21–23 September	Rotterdam (NED)	Netherlands	0–5	Loss
2008	Europe/Africa Zone Group II, 1st round	11–13 April	Estoril (POR)	Tunisia	4–1	Win
2008	Europe/Africa Zone Group II, 2nd round	18–20 July	Porto (POR)	Cyprus	5–0	Win
2008	Europe/Africa Zone Group II, Finals	19–21 September	Dnipropetrovsk (UKR)	Ukraine	0–5	Loss
2009	Europe/Africa Zone Group II, 1st round	6–8 March	Nicosia (CYP)	Cyprus	2–3	Loss
2009	Europe/Africa Zone Group II, Relegation play-off	10–12 July	Oran (ALG)	Algeria	5–0	Win

=== 2010s ===
Year	Competition	Date	Location	Opponent	Score	Result
2010	Europe/Africa Zone Group II, 1st round	5–7 March	Maia (POR)	Denmark	4–1	Win
2010	Europe/Africa Zone Group II, 2nd round	9–11 July	Cruz Quebrada (POR)	Cyprus	5–0	Win
2010	Europe/Africa Zone Group II, 3rd round	17–19 September	Cruz Quebrada (POR)	Bosnia and Herzegovina	3–2	Win
2011	Europe/Africa Zone Group I, 1st round	4–6 March	Cruz Quebrada (POR)	Slovakia	4–1	Win
2011	Europe/Africa Zone Group I, 2nd round	8–10 July	Bern (SUI)	Switzerland	0–5	Loss
2012	Europe/Africa Zone Group I, 1st round	10–12 February	Bye			
2012	Europe/Africa Zone Group I, 2nd round	6–8 April	Ramat HaSharon (ISR)	Israel	2–3	Loss
2012	Europe/Africa Zone Group I, Relegation play-off	14–16 September	Bratislava (SVK)	Slovakia	1–3	Loss
2013	Europe/Africa Zone Group II, 1st round	1–3 February	Lisbon (POR)	Benin	5–0	Win
2013	Europe/Africa Zone Group II, 2nd round	5–7 April	Lisbon (POR)	Lithuania	5–0	Win
2013	Europe/Africa Zone Group II, 3rd round	13–15 September	Chișinău (MDA)	Moldova	3–2	Win
2014	Europe/Africa Zone Group I, 1st round	31 January – 2 February	Kranj (SLO)	Slovenia	2–3	Loss
2014	Europe/Africa Zone Group I, 1st round play-off	12–14 September	Bye			
2014	Europe/Africa Zone Group I, 2nd round play-off	12–14 September	Moscow (RUS)	Russia	1–4	Loss
2015	Europe/Africa Zone Group II, 1st round	6–8 March	Cruz Quebrada (POR)	Morocco	4–1	Win
2015	Europe/Africa Zone Group II, 2nd round	17–19 July	Viana do Castelo (POR)	Finland	4–1	Win
2015	Europe/Africa Zone Group II, 3rd round	18–20 September	Viana do Castelo (POR)	Belarus	3–2	Win
2016	Europe/Africa Zone Group I, 1st round	4–6 March	Guimarães (POR)	Austria	1–4	Loss
2016	Europe/Africa Zone Group I, 1st round play-off	16–18 September	Bye			
2016	Europe/Africa Zone Group I, 2nd round play-off	16–18 September	Viana do Castelo (POR)	Slovenia	5–0	Win
2017	Europe/Africa Zone Group I, 1st round	3–5 February	Lisbon (POR)	Israel	5–0	Win
2017	Europe/Africa Zone Group I, 2nd round	7–9 April	Lisbon (POR)	Ukraine	4–1	Win
2017	World Group play-offs	15–17 September	Lisbon (POR)	Germany	2–3	Loss
2018	Europe/Africa Zone Group I, 1st round	2–3 February	Bye			
2018	Europe/Africa Zone Group I, 2nd round	6–7 April	Stockholm (SWE)	Sweden	2–3	Loss
2018	Europe/Africa Zone Group I, 1st round play-offs	14–15 September	(UKR)	Ukraine		

== Statistics ==
Since 1981 (Current through 2017 Davis Cup Europe/Africa Zone Group I Second round)

Record

- World Group: 0 times
- WG Play-off: 2 time
- Europe/Africa Zone Group I: 21 times
- Europe/Africa Zone Group II: 11 times

Home and away record (since 1925)

- Performance at home (56 match-ups): 32–24 (57.14%)
- Performance away (51 match-ups): 13–38 (25.49%)
- Total: 45–62 (42.06%)

Head-to-head record (1981–)

- Algeria 3–0
- Tunisia 3–0
- Morocco 2–0
- Monaco 2–0
- Cyprus 2–1
- Hungary 2–1
- Serbia and Montenegro 2–1
- Slovenia 2–1
- Ukraine 2–2
- Benin 1–0
- Bosnia and Herzegovina 1–0
- Estonia 1–0
- Finland 1–0
- Ghana 1–0
- Ireland 1–0
- Lithuania 1–0
- Moldova 1–0
- Senegal 1–0
- Belarus 1–1
- Croatia 1–1
- Denmark 1–1
- Egypt 1–1
- Georgia 1–1
- Luxembourg 1–1
- Romania 1–1
- South Africa 1–1
- Zimbabwe 1–1
- Great Britain 1–2
- Israel 1–2
- Slovakia 1–2
- Italy 0–1
- Switzerland 0–1
- Norway 0–2
- Austria 0–4
- Netherlands 0–4
- Russia 0–4

Russia record includes two losses against Soviet Union and one loss against CIS.
Serbia and Montenegro record includes two victories against Yugoslavia.

Record against continents

Africa	Asia	Europe	North America	Oceania	South America
Algeria; Benin; Egypt; Ghana; Morocco; Senegal; South Africa; Tunisia; Zimbabwe		Austria; Belarus; Bosnia and Herzegovina; Croatia; Cyprus; Denmark; Estonia; Finland; Georgia; Great Britain; Hungary; Ireland; Israel; Italy; Lithuania; Luxembourg; Moldova; Monaco; Netherlands; Norway; Romania; Russia; Serbia and Montenegro; Slovakia; Slovenia; Switzerland; Ukraine			
Record: 14–3 (82.4%)	Record: 0–0 (0.0%)	Record: 27–34 (44.3%)	Record: 0–0 (0.0%)	Record: 0–0 (0.0%)	Record: 0–0 (0.0%)

Record by decade

- 1981–1989: 7–9 (43.8%)
- 1990–1999: 10–10 (50.0%)
- 2000–2009: 11–12 (47.8%)
- 2010–2019: 13–6 (68.4%)

== See also ==
- Davis Cup
- Portugal Billie Jean King Cup team
- Portuguese Tennis Federation
