= Dittelbrunn =

- Municipality
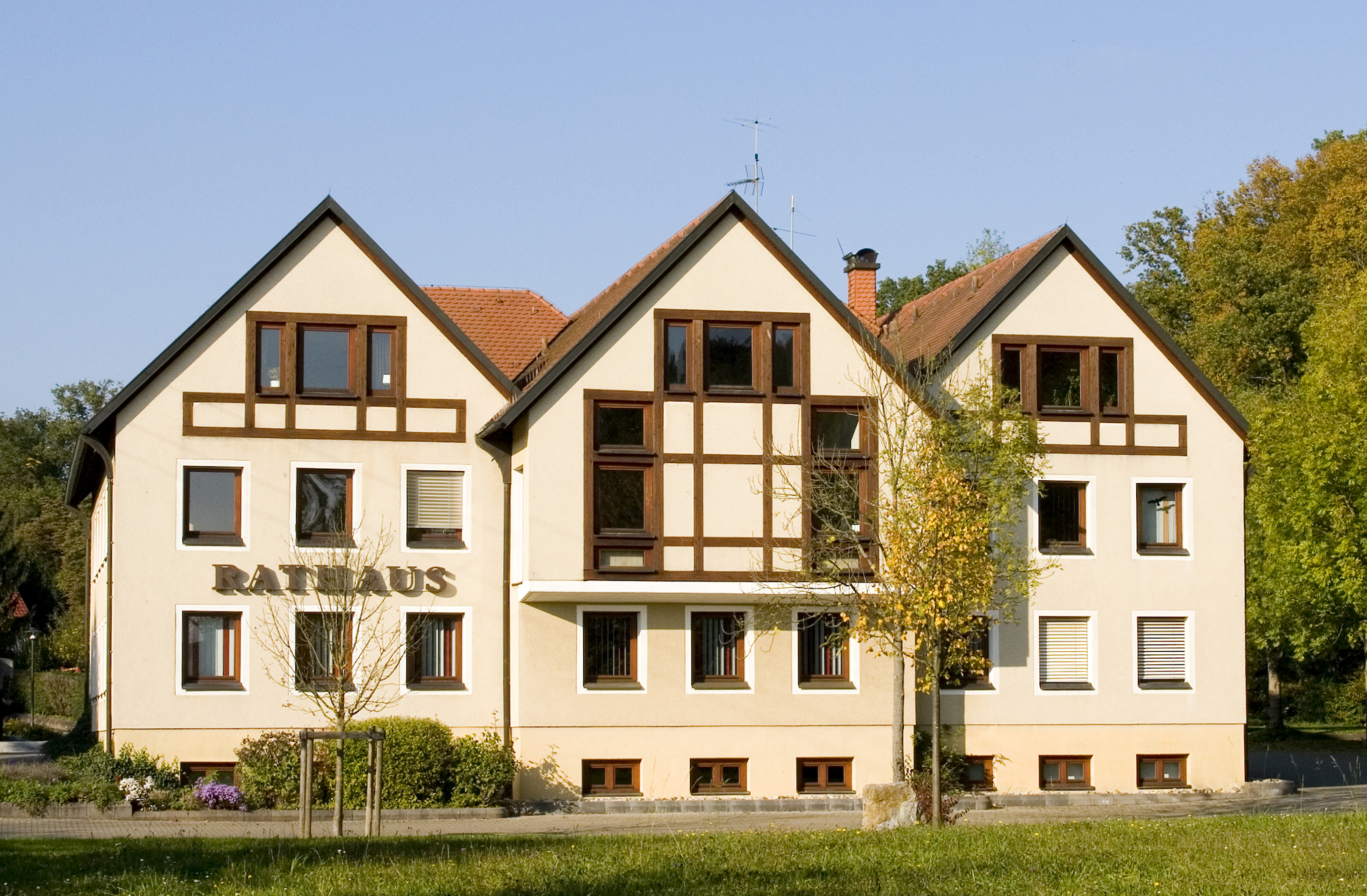
- Town hall

- Coat of arms

- Location of Dittelbrunn within Schweinfurt district
- Interactive map of Dittelbrunn
- Location within Germany Location within Bavaria
- Coordinates: 50°05′42″N 10°12′34″E
- Country: Germany
- State: Bavaria
- Admin. region: Unterfranken
- District: Schweinfurt

Government
  - Mayor (2023–29): Willi Warmuth (CSU)

Area
  - Total: 23.84 km^{2} (9.20 sq mi)
- Elevation: 240–360 m (790–1,180 ft)

Population (2025-12-31)
  - Total: 7,460
  - Density: 313/km^{2} (810/sq mi)
- Time zone: UTC+01:00 (CET)
  - Summer (DST): UTC+02:00 (CEST)
- Postal codes: 97456
- Dialling codes: 09721, 09725, 09738
- Vehicle registration: SW
- Website: www.dittelbrunn.de

Dittelbrunn is a municipality in the district of Schweinfurt in Bavaria, Germany.

Dittelbrunn consists of 4 parts: Dittelbrunn, Hambach, Holzhausen und Pfändhausen.

Dittelbrunn: Biggest part with 3741 inhabitants.

Hambach: Second biggest part with 2676 inhabitants.

Pfändhausen: Northern part with 616 inhabitants

Holzhausen: Smallest part with 441 inhabitants.
