= Algés, Linda-a-Velha e Cruz Quebrada-Dafundo =

- Civil parish
- Location in Portugal
- Coordinates: 38.700°N 9.231°W
- Country: Portugal
- Region: Lisbon
- Metropolitan area: Lisbon
- District: Lisbon
- Municipality: Oeiras

Area
  - Total: 7.18 km^{2} (2.77 sq mi)

Population (2011)
  - Total: 48,665
  - Density: 6,800/km^{2} (18,000/sq mi)
- Time zone: UTC+00:00 (WET)
  - Summer (DST): UTC+01:00 (WEST)

Algés, Linda-a-Velha e Cruz Quebrada-Dafundo is a civil parish in the municipality of Oeiras, Portugal. It was formed in 2013 by the merger of the former parishes Algés, Linda-a-Velha and Cruz Quebrada-Dafundo. The population in 2011 was 48,665, in an area of 7.18 km².
