= Jānis Podžus =

Latvian tennis player (born 1994)

- Full name: Jānis Podžus
- Country (sports): Latvia
- Residence: Riga, Latvia
- Born: 29 June 1994 (age 31) Bauska, Latvia
- Plays: Left-handed (two handed-backhand)
- Prize money: $21.229

Singles
- Career record: 0–9 (at ATP Tour level, Grand Slam level, and in Davis Cup)
- Career titles: 0; 0 Challenger, 0 Futures
- Highest ranking: No. 675 (2 March 2015)

Doubles
- Career record: 0–2 (at ATP Tour level, Grand Slam level, and in Davis Cup)
- Career titles: 0; 0 Challenger, 6 Futures
- Highest ranking: No. 561 (19 August 2019)

Team competitions
- Davis Cup: 0–10
- Last updated on: 26 August 2019.

Jānis Podžus (born 29 June 1994) is a retired Latvian tennis player.

Podžus has a career high ATP singles ranking of 675 achieved on 2 March 2015. He also has a career high ATP doubles ranking of 634 achieved on 12 August 2019.

Podžus has represented Latvia at the Davis Cup where he has a W/L record of 0–10.

Podžus has a twin brother Mārtiņš Podžus is also a tennis player.

His last official match was a double's game together with his brother in September 2019, when they were defeated by Patrik Niklas-Salminen of Finland and Mans Dahlberg of Sweden.

== Future and Challenger finals ==
=== Singles: 2 (0–2) ===
Legend
Challengers 0 (0–0)
Futures 2 (0–2)

Outcome	No.	Date	Tournament	Surface	Opponent	Score
Runner-up	1.	July 27, 2014	Tallinn, Estonia F2	Clay	(Estonia) Vladimir Ivanov	2–6, 6–7^{(8–10)}
Runner-up	2.	December 20, 2014	Antalya, Turkey F45	Hard	(France) Rémi Boutillier	4–6, 6–7^{(4–7)}

=== Doubles 10 (6–4) ===
Legend
Challengers 0 (0–0)
Futures 8 (4–4)

Outcome	No.	Date	Tournament	Surface	Partner	Opponents	Score
Runner-up	1.	March 9, 2014	Cherkasy, Ukraine F1	Hard (i)	(Latvia) Mārtiņš Podžus	(Ukraine) Vladyslav Manafov (Croatia) Filip Veger	2–6, 5–7
Winner	2.	December 7, 2014	Antalya, Turkey F43	Hard	(Latvia) Mārtiņš Podžus	(Portugal) Romain Barbosa (Portugal) Frederico Ferreira Silva	4–6, 6–3, [10–7]
Runner-up	3.	December 14, 2014	Antalya, Turkey F44	Hard	(Latvia) Mārtiņš Podžus	(Romania) Bogdan Ionuț Apostol (Lithuania) Lukas Mugevičius	4–6, 6–4, [11–13]
Winner	4.	April 19, 2015	Sharm El Sheikh, Egypt F14	Hard	(Latvia) Mārtiņš Podžus	(Austria) Martin Fischer (Switzerland) Jannis Liniger	6–0, 0–6, [10–7]
Runner-up	5.	October 4, 2015	Hambach, Germany F14	Carpet (i)	(Latvia) Mārtiņš Podžus	(Germany) Johannes Härteis (Germany) Hannes Wagner	6–7^{(5–7)}, 6–7^{(4–7)}
Runner-up	6.	October 18, 2015	Bad Salzdetfurth, Germany F16	Carpet (i)	(Latvia) Mārtiņš Podžus	(Czech Republic) Petr Michnev (Czech Republic) Pavel Nejedlý	4–6, 2–6
Winner	7.	October 6, 2018	Falun, Sweden F5	Hard (i)	(Latvia) Mārtiņš Podžus	(Switzerland) Antoine Bellier (Germany) Johannes Härteis	6–1, 6–2
Winner	8.	November 10, 2018	Pärnu, Estonia F3	Hard (i)	(Latvia) Mārtiņš Podžus	(Estonia) Vladimir Ivanov (Russia) Maxim Ratniuk	6–3, 6–4
Winner	9.	July 21, 2019	M15 Piešťany, Slovakia	Clay	(Latvia) Mārtiņš Podžus	(Czech Republic) Vít Kopřiva (Czech Republic) Petr Nouza	6–7^{(3–7)}, 7–6^{(7–1)}, [10–7]
Winner	10.	August 11, 2019	M15 Koszalin, Poland	Clay	(Latvia) Mārtiņš Podžus	(Germany) Hasan Ibrahim (Germany) Timo Stodder	7–6^{(9–7)}, 5–7, [10–5]
