= 2008 Davis Cup World Group play-offs =

The World Group play-offs were the main play-offs of 2008 Davis Cup. Winners advanced to the World Group, and loser were relegated in the Zonal Regions I.

== Teams ==
Bold indicates team has qualified for the 2009 Davis Cup World Group.

From World Group

- **Serbia**
- Belgium
- Great Britain
- **Israel**
- South Korea
- Peru
- **Romania**
- **Austria**

From Americas Group I

- **Chile**
- Brazil

From Asia/Oceania Group I

- Australia
- India

From Europe/Africa Group I

- **Croatia**
- **Netherlands**
- **Switzerland**
- Slovakia

== Results ==
**Seeded teams**

- Australia
- Austria
- Belgium
- Croatia
- Israel
- South Korea
- Romania
- Slovakia

**Unseeded teams**

- Brazil
- Chile
- Great Britain
- India
- Netherlands
- Peru
- Serbia
- Switzerland

Home team	Score	Visiting team	Location	Venue	Door	Surface
**Chile**	3–2	Australia	Antofagasta	Estadio Militar Antofagasta	Outdoor	Clay
Great Britain	2–3	**Austria**	Wimbledon, London	All England Lawn Tennis Club	Outdoor	Grass
**Switzerland**	4–1	Belgium	Lausanne	Centre Intercommunal de Glace Malley	Indoor	Hard
**Croatia**	4–1	Brazil	Zadar	Športski centar Višnjik	Indoor	Hard
**Israel**	4–1	Peru	Ramat HaSharon	Israel Tennis Center	Outdoor	Hard
**Netherlands**	4–1	South Korea	Apeldoorn	Omnisport Apeldoorn	Indoor	Clay
**Romania**	4–1	India	Bucharest	Clubul Sportiv Progresul	Outdoor	Clay
Slovakia	1–4	**Serbia**	Bratislava	Sibamac Arena	Indoor	Hard

- Austria, Israel, Romania, and Serbia will remain in the World Group in 2009.
- Chile, Croatia, Netherlands and Switzerland are promoted to the World Group in 2009.
- Australia, Brazil, India and Slovakia will remain in Zonal Group I in 2009.
- Belgium, Great Britain, Peru and South Korea are relegated to Zonal Group I in 2009.

== Playoff results ==
=== Chile vs. Australia ===
Chile
3
Estadio Militar Antofagasta, Antofagasta, Chile
September 19–21, 2008
Clay

Australia
2

			1	2	3	4	5
1	(Chile) (Australia)	**Nicolás Massú**; Chris Guccione	**7^{7}** 6^{5}	**7^{7}** 6^{5}	3; **6**	**7^{7}** 6^{2}
2	(Chile) (Australia)	**Fernando González**; Peter Luczak	**6**; 2	**6**; 2	**6**; 3
3	(Chile) (Australia)	Fernando González / Nicolás Massú; **Carsten Ball / Chris Guccione**	**7^{7}** 6^{5}	6^{9} **7^{11}**	3; **6**	**7**; 5	5; **7**
4	(Chile) (Australia)	**Fernando González**; Chris Guccione	**7^{7}** 6^{4}	**7**; 5	**6**; 3
5	(Chile) (Australia)	Paul Capdeville; **Carsten Ball**	3; **6**	6^{4} **7^{7}**

=== Great Britain vs. Austria ===
Great Britain
2
All England Lawn Tennis Club, Wimbledon, London, Great Britain
September 19–21, 2008
Grass

Austria
3

			1	2	3	4	5
1	(United Kingdom) (Austria)	Alex Bogdanović; **Jürgen Melzer**	**6**; 3	6^{4} **7^{7}**	2; **6**	1; **6**
2	(United Kingdom) (Austria)	**Andy Murray**; Alexander Peya	**6**; 4	**6**; 1	**6**; 3
3	(United Kingdom) (Austria)	Ross Hutchins / Jamie Murray; **Julian Knowle / Jürgen Melzer**	4; **6**	3; **6**	1; **6**
4	(United Kingdom) (Austria)	**Andy Murray**; Jürgen Melzer	**6**; 4	5; **7**	**6**; 4	**6**; 1
5	(United Kingdom) (Austria)	Alex Bogdanović; **Alexander Peya**	**6**; 2	4; **6**	4; **6**	2; **6**

=== Switzerland vs. Belgium ===
Switzerland
4
Centre Intercommunal de Glace Malley, Lausanne, Switzerland
September 19–21, 2008
Hard (i)

Belgium
1

			1	2	3	4	5
1	(Switzerland) (Belgium)	**Stanislas Wawrinka**; Steve Darcis	6^{4} **7^{7}**	**6**; 1	**6**; 3	2; **6**	**6**; 4
2	(Switzerland) (Belgium)	**Roger Federer**; Kristof Vliegen	**7^{7}** 6^{1}	**6**; 4	**6**; 2
3	(Switzerland) (Belgium)	**Roger Federer / Stanislas Wawrinka**; Xavier Malisse / Olivier Rochus	4; **6**	**7^{8}** 6^{6}	**6**; 3	**6**; 3
4	(Switzerland) (Belgium)	**Stéphane Bohli**; Steve Darcis	**6**; 3	1; **6**	**6**; 3
5	(Switzerland) (Belgium)	Yves Allegro; **Xavier Malisse**	3; **6**	2; **6**

=== Croatia vs. Brazil ===
Croatia
4
Športski centar Višnjik, Zadar, Croatia
September 19–21, 2008
Hard (i)

Brazil
1

			1	2	3	4	5
1	(Croatia) (Brazil)	**Mario Ančić**; Thomaz Bellucci	**6**; 2	**7^{7}** 6^{5}	**7^{7}** 6^{4}
2	(Croatia) (Brazil)	**Ivo Karlović**; Thiago Alves	**7^{7}** 6^{5}	**7^{7}** 6^{4}	**7**; 5
3	(Croatia) (Brazil)	Ivo Karlović / Lovro Zovko; **Marcelo Melo / André Sá**	**7^{7}** 6^{4}	2; **6**	5; **7**	**7^{7}** 6^{5}	3; **6**
4	(Croatia) (Brazil)	**Ivo Karlović**; Thomaz Bellucci	**7^{7}** 6^{5}	**6**; 4	6^{6} **7^{8}**	**7^{7}** 6^{5}
5	(Croatia) (Brazil)	**Roko Karanušić**; Thiago Alves	**7^{7}** 6^{5}	4; **6**	**7^{7}** 6^{5}

=== Israel vs. Peru ===
Israel
4
Israel Tennis Center, Ramat HaSharon, Israel
September 19–21, 2008
Hard

Peru
1

			1	2	3	4	5
1	(Israel) (Peru)	Harel Levy; **Luis Horna**	5; **7**	**7**; 5	6^{4} **7^{7}**	3; **6**
2	(Israel) (Peru)	**Dudi Sela**; Iván Miranda	**6**; 2	**6**; 1	3; **6**	**6**; 4
3	(Israel) (Peru)	**Harel Levy / Andy Ram**; Mauricio Echazú / Matías Silva	**6**; 1	**6**; 1	**6**; 2
4	(Israel) (Peru)	**Dudi Sela**; Luis Horna	6^{6} **7^{8}**	**6**; 4	**6**; 1	**6**; 2
5	(Israel) (Peru)	**Noam Okun**; Iván Miranda	**6**; 4	5; **7**	**6**; 3

=== Netherlands vs. South Korea ===
Netherlands
3
Omnisport Apeldoorn, Apeldoorn, Netherlands
September 19–21, 2008
Clay (i)

South Korea
2

			1	2	3	4	5
1	(Netherlands) (South Korea)	Thiemo de Bakker; **Lee Hyung-taik**	4; **6**	3; **6**	3; **6**
2	(Netherlands) (South Korea)	**Jesse Huta Galung**; Im Kyu-tae	**6**; 3	**6**; 3	5; **7**	**6**; 2
3	(Netherlands) (South Korea)	**Jesse Huta Galung / Peter Wessels**; Jun Woong-sun / Lee Hyung-taik	4; **6**	**6**; 4	**6**; 4	**6**; 3
4	(Netherlands) (South Korea)	Jesse Huta Galung; **Lee Hyung-taik**	**6**; 1	1; **6**	6^{5} **7^{7}**	2; **6**
5	(Netherlands) (South Korea)	**Thiemo de Bakker**; Jun Woong-sun	**6**; 2	**6**; 1	**6**; 3

=== Romania vs. India ===
Romania
4
Clubul Sportiv Progresul, Bucharest, Romania
September 19–21, 2008
Clay

India
1

			1	2	3	4	5
1	(Romania) (India)	**Victor Crivoi**; Prakash Amritraj	**7**; 5	5; **7**	**6**; 2	**6**; 2
2	(Romania) (India)	**Victor Hănescu**; Somdev Devvarman	**6**; 3	**6**; 1	**6**; 0
3	(Romania) (India)	Adrian Cruciat / Horia Tecău; **Mahesh Bhupathi / Leander Paes**	4; **6**	6^{0} **7**	4; **6**
4	(Romania) (India)	**Victor Hănescu**; Prakash Amritraj	**6**; 2	**6**; 3	**6**; 1
5	(Romania) (India)	**Victor Crivoi**; Somdev Devvarman	4; **6**	**7**; 5	**6**; 3

=== Slovakia vs. Serbia ===
Slovakia
1
Sibamac Arena, Bratislava, Slovakia
September 19–21, 2008
Hard (i)

Serbia
4

			1	2	3	4	5
1	(Slovakia) (Serbia)	Dominik Hrbatý; **Novak Djokovic**	2; **6**	4; **6**	3; **6**
2	(Slovakia) (Serbia)	Lukáš Lacko; **Janko Tipsarević**	**7^{7}** 6^{3}	**6**; 4	4; **6**	6^{5} **7^{7}**	6; **8**
3	(Slovakia) (Serbia)	Michal Mertiňák / Filip Polášek; **Viktor Troicki / Nenad Zimonjić**	6^{8} **7^{10}**	4; **6**	**7^{9}** 6^{7}	6^{5} **7^{7}**
4	(Slovakia) (Serbia)	Lukáš Lacko; **Viktor Troicki**	3; **6**	4; **6**
5	(Slovakia) (Serbia)	**Filip Polášek**; Janko Tipsarević						**w/o**
