= 2017 Davis Cup Europe/Africa Zone Group I =

International tennis competition

The Europe/Africa Zone was one of the three zones of the regional Davis Cup competition in 2016.

In the Europe/Africa Zone there were three different tiers, called groups, in which teams competed against each other to advance to the upper tier. Winners in Group I advanced to the World Group play-offs, along with losing teams from the World Group first round. Teams who lost their respective ties competed in the relegation play-offs, with winning teams remaining in Group I, whereas teams who lost their play-offs were relegated to the Europe/Africa Zone Group II in 2018.

== Participating nations ==
Seeds: All seeds and Hungary received a bye into the second round.

1. Slovakia
2. Ukraine
3. Netherlands
4. Austria

Remaining nations:

- Belarus
- Bosnia and Herzegovina
- Hungary
- Israel
- Poland
- Portugal
- Romania

=== Draw ===
Second Round Play-offs
Bratislava, Slovakia (clay)
1	Slovakia	4
Poland	1
Ramat HaSharon, Israel (hard)
Romania	0
Israel	5

First Round Play-offs
1	Slovakia
bye
bye
Poland
Wels, Austria (clay)
Romania	1
4	Austria	4
Ramat HaSharon, Israel (hard)
Israel	0
2	Ukraine	5

First Round
1	Slovakia
bye
Hungary
bye
3	Netherlands
bye
Zenica, Bosnia and Herz. (indoor hard)
Poland	0
Bosnia and Herzegovina	5
Minsk, Belarus (indoor hard)
Romania	2
Belarus	3
bye
4	Austria
Lisbon, Portugal (indoor clay)
Israel	0
Portugal	5
bye
2	Ukraine

Second Round
Bratislava, Slovakia (indoor hard)
1	Slovakia	1
Hungary	3
Zenica, Bosnia and Herz. (indoor hard)
3	Netherlands	3
Bosnia and Herzegovina	1
Minsk, Belarus (indoor hard)
Belarus	3
4	Austria	1
Lisbon, Portugal (indoor clay)
Portugal	4
2	Ukraine	1

- Poland and Romania relegated to Group II in 2018.
- Hungary, Netherlands, Belarus, and Portugal advance to World Group Play-off.

== First round ==
=== Bosnia and Herzegovina vs. Poland ===
Bosnia and Herzegovina
5
Arena Zenica, Zenica, Bosnia and Herzegovina
3–5 February 2017
Hard (i)

Poland
0

			1	2	3	4	5
1	(Bosnia and Herzegovina) (Poland)	Mirza Bašić; Kamil Majchrzak	6; 4	6; 3	0; 0			retired
2	(Bosnia and Herzegovina) (Poland)	Damir Džumhur; Hubert Hurkacz	7^{7} 6^{1}	7; 5	7; 5
3	(Bosnia and Herzegovina) (Poland)	Mirza Bašić / Tomislav Brkić; Łukasz Kubot / Marcin Matkowski	7^{7} 6^{5}	7^{7} 6^{5}	3; 6	4; 6	6; 3
4	(Bosnia and Herzegovina) (Poland)	Damir Džumhur; Kamil Majchrzak						w/o
5	(Bosnia and Herzegovina) (Poland)	Tomislav Brkić; Hubert Hurkacz	7^{7} 6^{1}	4; 6	7; 5

=== Belarus vs. Romania ===
Belarus
3
Republic Olympic Training Center, Minsk, Belarus
3–5 February 2017
Hard (i)

Romania
2

			1	2	3	4	5
1	(Belarus) (Romania)	Ilya Ivashka; Adrian Ungur	2; 6	7; 5	4; 6	4; 6
2	(Belarus) (Romania)	Egor Gerasimov; Marius Copil	6; 3	6; 4	6; 4
3	(Belarus) (Romania)	Max Mirnyi / Yaraslav Shyla; Marius Copil / Horia Tecău	7^{7} 6^{3}	6; 4	6^{5} 7^{7}	6; 4
4	(Belarus) (Romania)	Ilya Ivashka; Marius Copil	5; 7	4; 6	1; 6
5	(Belarus) (Romania)	Egor Gerasimov; Adrian Ungur	7^{7} 6^{5}	6; 4	6; 4

=== Portugal vs. Israel ===
Portugal
5
Club Internacional de Foot-ball, Lisbon, Portugal
3–5 February 2017
Clay (i)

Israel
0

			1	2	3	4	5
1	(Portugal) (Israel)	João Sousa; Yshai Oliel	6; 1	6; 1	6; 2
2	(Portugal) (Israel)	Gastão Elias; Dudi Sela	1; 6	6; 2	6; 4	6; 2
3	(Portugal) (Israel)	Gastão Elias / João Sousa; Jonathan Erlich / Dudi Sela	7; 5	6^{4} 7^{7}	4; 6	6; 2	6; 4
4	(Portugal) (Israel)	Frederico Ferreira Silva; Daniel Cukierman	6; 2	6; 0
5	(Portugal) (Israel)	Pedro Sousa; Yshai Oliel	6; 2	6; 0

== Second round ==
=== Slovakia vs. Hungary ===
Slovakia
1
Aegon Arena, Bratislava, Slovakia
3–5 February 2017
Hard (i)

Hungary
3

			1	2	3	4	5
1	(Slovakia) (Hungary)	Martin Kližan; Attila Balázs	6; 1	6; 2	3; 6	6; 4
2	(Slovakia) (Hungary)	Jozef Kovalík; Márton Fucsovics	2; 6	7^{7} 6^{4}	3; 6	4; 6
3	(Slovakia) (Hungary)	Martin Kližan / Andrej Martin; Attila Balázs / Márton Fucsovics	3; 6	6; 2	3; 6	7^{7} 6^{5}	1; 6
4	(Slovakia) (Hungary)	Martin Kližan; Márton Fucsovics	6; 3	3; 6	3; 6	5; 7
5	(Slovakia) (Hungary)	Jozef Kovalík; Attila Balázs						not played

=== Bosnia and Herzegovina vs. Netherlands ===
Bosnia and Herzegovina
1
Arena Zenica, Zenica, Bosnia and Herzegovina
7–9 April 2017
Hard (i)

Netherlands
3

			1	2	3	4	5
1	(Bosnia and Herzegovina) (Netherlands)	Mirza Bašić; Robin Haase	4; 6	2; 6	7; 5	3; 6
2	(Bosnia and Herzegovina) (Netherlands)	Damir Džumhur; Thiemo de Bakker	6; 2	6; 2	6; 2
3	(Bosnia and Herzegovina) (Netherlands)	Mirza Bašić / Tomislav Brkić; Robin Haase / Jean-Julien Rojer	3; 6	6; 3	3; 6	2; 6
4	(Bosnia and Herzegovina) (Netherlands)	Damir Džumhur; Robin Haase	5; 7	3; 6	7^{7} 6^{4}	6; 2	4; 6
5	(Bosnia and Herzegovina) (Netherlands)	Mirza Bašić; Thiemo de Bakker						not played

=== Belarus vs. Austria ===
Belarus
3
Republic Olympic Training Center, Minsk, Belarus
7–9 April 2017
Hard (i)

Austria
1

			1	2	3	4	5
1	(Belarus) (Austria)	Egor Gerasimov; Gerald Melzer	6; 3	6; 3	6; 3
2	(Belarus) (Austria)	Ilya Ivashka; Jürgen Melzer	7^{10} 6^{8}	6; 3	4; 6	7^{7} 6^{1}
3	(Belarus) (Austria)	Max Mirnyi / Yaraslav Shyla; Julian Knowle / Jürgen Melzer	4; 6	6^{6} 7^{8}	7^{7} 6^{3}	4; 6
4	(Belarus) (Austria)	Ilya Ivashka; Gerald Melzer	7^{7} 6^{3}	3; 6	6; 3	6; 1
5	(Belarus) (Austria)	Egor Gerasimov; Jürgen Melzer						not played

=== Portugal vs. Ukraine ===
Portugal
4
Club Internacional de Foot-ball, Lisbon, Portugal
7–9 April 2017
Clay (i)

Ukraine
1

			1	2	3	4	5
1	(Portugal) (Ukraine)	Gastão Elias; Artem Smirnov	6; 4	7^{7} 6^{1}	6^{6} 7^{8}	3; 6	6; 1
2	(Portugal) (Ukraine)	João Sousa; Nikita Mashtakov	6; 0	6; 3	6; 0
3	(Portugal) (Ukraine)	Gastão Elias / João Sousa; Denys Molchanov / Artem Smirnov	7; 5	1; 6	3; 6	4; 6
4	(Portugal) (Ukraine)	João Sousa; Artem Smirnov	7^{7} 6^{3}	7^{7} 6^{2}	6; 2
5	(Portugal) (Ukraine)	Pedro Sousa; Illya Beloborodko	6; 0	6; 1

== 1st round play-offs ==
=== Austria vs. Romania ===
Austria
4
Union Tennis Club Wels, Wels, Austria
15–17 September 2017
Clay

Romania
1

			1	2	3	4	5
1	(Austria) (Romania)	Gerald Melzer; Dragoș Dima	6; 1	6; 1	3; 6	6; 1
2	(Austria) (Romania)	Dominic Thiem; Bogdan Borza	6; 2	6; 2	6; 4
3	(Austria) (Romania)	Philipp Oswald / Dominic Thiem; Nicolae Frunză / Horia Tecău	6^{1} 7^{7}	2; 6	7^{7} 6^{5}	3; 6
4	(Austria) (Romania)	Dominic Thiem; Nicolae Frunză	7^{7} 6^{2}	7^{7} 6^{3}	6; 3
5	(Austria) (Romania)	Gerald Melzer; Bogdan Borza	6; 1	7; 5

=== Israel vs. Ukraine ===
Israel
0
Canada Stadium, Ramat HaSharon, Israel
15–17 September 2017
Hard

Ukraine
5

			1	2	3	4	5
1	(Israel) (Ukraine)	Dudi Sela; Illya Marchenko	6^{5} 7^{7}	2; 6	3; 6
2	(Israel) (Ukraine)	Edan Leshem; Alexandr Dolgopolov	4; 6	1; 6	4; 6
3	(Israel) (Ukraine)	Jonathan Erlich / Dudi Sela; Denys Molchanov / Sergiy Stakhovsky	5; 7	6^{6} 7^{8}	6; 1	6; 4	6^{4} 7^{7}
4	(Israel) (Ukraine)	Mor Bulis; Alexandr Dolgopolov	3; 6	2; 6
5	(Israel) (Ukraine)	Edan Leshem; Illya Marchenko	1; 6	3; 6

== 2nd round play-offs ==
=== Slovakia vs. Poland ===
Slovakia
4
Aegon Arena, Bratislava, Slovakia
15–17 September 2017
Clay

Poland
1

			1	2	3	4	5
1	(Slovakia) (Poland)	Norbert Gombos; Hubert Hurkacz	6; 2	6; 2	3; 6	6; 4
2	(Slovakia) (Poland)	Andrej Martin; Kamil Majchrzak	7; 5	4; 6	6; 3	6; 3
3	(Slovakia) (Poland)	Andrej Martin / Igor Zelenay; Mateusz Kowalczyk / Łukasz Kubot	7^{7} 6^{3}	3; 6	3; 6	2; 6
4	(Slovakia) (Poland)	Norbert Gombos; Kamil Majchrzak	6; 1	6; 2	6; 4
5	(Slovakia) (Poland)	Jozef Kovalík; Hubert Hurkacz	6; 4	7; 5

=== Israel vs. Romania ===
Israel
5
Canada Stadium, Ramat HaSharon, Israel
27–29 October 2017
Hard

Romania
0

			1	2	3	4	5
1	(Israel) (Romania)	Edan Leshem; Dragoș Dima	6; 3	5; 7	6; 2	3; 6	6; 3
2	(Israel) (Romania)	Dudi Sela; Nicolae Frunză	6; 3	6; 4	6; 4
3	(Israel) (Romania)	Jonathan Erlich / Dudi Sela; Vasile Antonescu / Bogdan Borza	6; 3	6; 4	7^{7} 6^{4}
4	(Israel) (Romania)	Mor Bulis; Vasile Antonescu	7^{7} 6^{4}	6; 3
5	(Israel) (Romania)	Edan Leshem; Nicolae Frunză	6; 4	6^{3} 7^{7}	6; 2
