= 2009 Davis Cup World Group =

- Date: 6 March – 6 December
- Edition: 29th

Champions
- Spain
| ← 2008 · | Davis Cup | · 2010 → |

The World Group was the highest level of Davis Cup competition in 2009. The first-round losers went into the Davis Cup World Group play-offs, and the winners progress to the quarterfinals. The quarterfinalists were guaranteed a World Group spot for 2010.

== Participating teams ==
Participating teams
| Argentina | Austria | Chile | Croatia |
| Czech Republic | France | Germany | Israel |
| Netherlands | Romania | Russia | Serbia |
| Spain | Sweden | Switzerland | United States |

== Draw ==
First round 6–8 March
Buenos Aires, Argentina (clay)
1 | Argentina | 5
Netherlands | 0
Ostrava, Czech Republic (indoor carpet)
8 | France | 2
Czech Republic | 3
Birmingham, United States (indoor hard)
4 | United States | 4
Switzerland | 1
Poreč, Croatia (indoor hard)
5 | Croatia | 5
Chile | 0
Malmö, Sweden (indoor carpet)
Israel | 3
6 | Sweden | 2
Sibiu, Romania (indoor carpet)
Romania | 1
3 | Russia | 4
Garmisch-Partenkirchen, Germany (indoor hard)
Austria | 2
7 | Germany | 3
Benidorm, Spain (clay)
Serbia | 1
2 | Spain | 4

Quarterfinals; 10–12 July
Ostrava, Czech Republic (indoor hard)
1 | Argentina | 2
Czech Republic | 3
Poreč, Croatia (indoor clay)
4 | United States | 2
5 | Croatia | 3
Tel Aviv, Israel (indoor hard)
Israel | 4
3 | Russia | 1
Marbella, Spain (clay)
7 | Germany | 2
2 | Spain | 3

Semifinals; 18–20 September
Poreč, Croatia (indoor clay)
Czech Republic | 4
5 | Croatia | 1
Murcia, Spain (clay)
Israel | 1
2 | Spain | 4

Final; 4–6 December
Barcelona, Spain (indoor clay)
Czech Republic | 0
2 | Spain | 5

== First round ==
=== Argentina vs. Netherlands ===
Argentina
5
Estadio Parque Roca, Buenos Aires, Argentina
6–8 March 2009
Clay

Netherlands
0

| | | | 1 | 2 | 3 | 4 | 5 |
|---|---|---|---|---|---|---|---|
| 1 | (Argentina) (Netherlands) | Juan Ignacio Chela; Jesse Huta Galung | 6; 2 | 2; 6 | 6; 2 | 6^{4} 7^{7} | 6; 2 |
| 2 | (Argentina) (Netherlands) | Juan Mónaco; Thiemo de Bakker | 6; 1 | 6; 2 | 7^{7} 6^{1} |
| 3 | (Argentina) (Netherlands) | Lucas Arnold Ker / Martín Vassallo Argüello; Jesse Huta Galung / Rogier Wassen | 6; 4 | 7; 5 | 6; 3 |
| 4 | (Argentina) (Netherlands) | Martín Vassallo Argüello; Matwé Middelkoop | 6; 2 | 6; 4 |
| 5 | (Argentina) (Netherlands) | Juan Ignacio Chela; Thiemo de Bakker | 7; 5 | 6; 2 |

=== Czech Republic vs. France ===
Czech Republic
3
ČEZ Aréna, Ostrava, Czech Republic
6–8 March 2009
Carpet (i)

France
2

| | | | 1 | 2 | 3 | 4 | 5 |
|---|---|---|---|---|---|---|---|
| 1 | (Czech Republic) (France) | Tomáš Berdych; Gilles Simon | 7^{7} 6^{3} | 4; 6 | 7^{7} 6^{2} | 6; 3 |
| 2 | (Czech Republic) (France) | Radek Štěpánek; Jo-Wilfried Tsonga | 5; 7 | 2; 6 | 6^{1} 7^{7} |
| 3 | (Czech Republic) (France) | Tomáš Berdych / Radek Štěpánek; Richard Gasquet / Michaël Llodra | 6; 3 | 1; 6 | 6; 4 | 6; 2 |
| 4 | (Czech Republic) (France) | Radek Štěpánek; Gilles Simon | 7^{7} 6^{2} | 6; 3 | 7; 6 |
| 5 | (Czech Republic) (France) | Jan Hernych; Jo-Wilfried Tsonga | 2; 6 | 7^{7} 6^{5} | 6^{0} 7^{7} |

=== United States vs. Switzerland ===
United States
4
Birmingham–Jefferson Convention Complex Arena, Birmingham, United States
6–8 March 2009
Hard (i)

Switzerland
1

| | | | 1 | 2 | 3 | 4 | 5 |
|---|---|---|---|---|---|---|---|
| 1 | (United States) (Switzerland) | James Blake; Stanislas Wawrinka | 6; 3 | 4; 6 | 3; 6 | 6^{3} 7^{7} |
| 2 | (United States) (Switzerland) | Andy Roddick; Marco Chiudinelli | 6; 1 | 6; 3 | 7^{7} 6^{5} |
| 3 | (United States) (Switzerland) | Bob Bryan / Mike Bryan; Yves Allegro / Stanislas Wawrinka | 6; 3 | 6; 4 | 3; 6 | 7^{7} 6^{2} |
| 4 | (United States) (Switzerland) | Andy Roddick; Stanislas Wawrinka | 6; 4 | 6; 4 | 6; 2 |
| 5 | (United States) (Switzerland) | James Blake; Marco Chiudinelli | 6; 4 | 7^{8} 6^{6} |

=== Croatia vs. Chile ===
Croatia
5
Višenamjenska Sportska Dvorana Žatika, Poreč, Croatia
6–8 March 2009
Hard (i)

Chile
0

| | | | 1 | 2 | 3 | 4 | 5 |
|---|---|---|---|---|---|---|---|
| 1 | (Croatia) (Chile) | Mario Ančić; Nicolás Massú | 6; 3 | 6; 3 | 7^{7} 6^{4} |
| 2 | (Croatia) (Chile) | Marin Čilić; Paul Capdeville | 6; 1 | 6; 2 | 6; 1 |
| 3 | (Croatia) (Chile) | Mario Ančić / Marin Čilić; Paul Capdeville / Nicolás Massú | 6; 3 | 6; 3 | 3; 6 | 6; 4 |
| 4 | (Croatia) (Chile) | Roko Karanušić; Guillermo Hormazábal | 7; 5 | 6; 3 |
| 5 | (Croatia) (Chile) | Ivo Karlović; Hans Podlipnik-Castillo | 6; 3 | 7^{7} 6^{4} |

=== Sweden vs. Israel ===
Sweden
2
Baltiska Hallen, Malmö, Sweden
6–8 March 2009
Carpet (i)

Israel
3

| | | | 1 | 2 | 3 | 4 | 5 |
|---|---|---|---|---|---|---|---|
| 1 | (Sweden) (Israel) | Thomas Johansson; Harel Levy | 6^{3} 7^{7} | 6; 4 | 7; 5 | 4; 6 | 8; 6 |
| 2 | (Sweden) (Israel) | Andreas Vinciguerra; Dudi Sela | 6; 4 | 3; 6 | 6; 3 | 3; 6 | 9; 11 |
| 3 | (Sweden) (Israel) | Simon Aspelin / Robert Lindstedt; Amir Hadad / Andy Ram | 6; 4 | 1; 6 | 7^{7} 6^{4} | 6; 4 |
| 4 | (Sweden) (Israel) | Thomas Johansson; Dudi Sela | 6; 3 | 1; 6 | 6; 4 | 4; 6 | 2; 6 |
| 5 | (Sweden) (Israel) | Andreas Vinciguerra; Harel Levy | 4; 6 | 6; 4 | 4; 6 | 6; 3 | 6; 8 |

==== Controversy and riots ====
Sweden attracted controversy when they forbade fans from seeing the matches inside Baltiska Hallen, fearing anti-Israeli violence. Several Swedish politicians, including the mayor of Malmö and the head of the Green Party, said that they wanted to cancel the match instead of having an Israeli team play in the city, but after it was strongly pointed out that Sweden would suffer a forfeit loss and immediate elimination from the Cup tournament, the prospect of a cancellation was nixed. A proposal to move the matches to Stockholm fell through because of limited preparation time. Israeli player Andy Ram condemned the switch, calling it a "stupid decision". On the 7 March a breakaway group from an anti-Israel protest attacked police outside the stadium as the match was ongoing inside.

The Davis Cup fined the Swedish tennis federation $25,000 and ordered them to pay an additional $15,000 in what would have been gate receipts. The city of Malmö was also banned from hosting Davis Cup matches for the next five years, and Sweden will lose its choice of venue if it happens again, being required to guarantee that future matches will be open to the public. Since 2009, Israeli teams have competed in numerous sporting events inside Sweden and no repeat instances of attempted boycotts/spectator bans have been tried since Malmo.

=== Romania vs. Russia ===
Romania
1
Sala Transilvania, Sibiu, Romania
6–8 March 2009
Carpet (i)

Russia
4

| | | | 1 | 2 | 3 | 4 | 5 |
|---|---|---|---|---|---|---|---|
| 1 | (Romania) (Russia) | Victor Crivoi; Marat Safin | 6^{5} 7^{7} | 4; 6 | 4; 6 |
| 2 | (Romania) (Russia) | Victor Hănescu; Mikhail Youzhny | 4; 6 | 2; 6 | 4; 6 |
| 3 | (Romania) (Russia) | Marius Copil / Horia Tecău; Marat Safin / Dmitry Tursunov | 4; 6 | 6^{2} 7^{7} | 7^{7} 6^{4} | 7^{7} 6^{5} | 6; 4 |
| 4 | (Romania) (Russia) | Victor Hănescu; Dmitry Tursunov | 6; 4 | 7; 5 | 3; 6 | 4; 6 | 2; 6 |
| 5 | (Romania) (Russia) | Victor Crivoi; Teymuraz Gabashvili | 4; 6 | 2; 6 |

=== Germany vs. Austria ===
Germany
3
Olympia Eissportzentrum, Garmisch-Partenkirchen, Germany
6–8 March 2009
Hard (i)

Austria
2

| | | | 1 | 2 | 3 | 4 | 5 |
|---|---|---|---|---|---|---|---|
| 1 | (Germany) (Austria) | Rainer Schüttler; Stefan Koubek | 4; 6 | 5; 7 | 7; 5 | 2; 6 |
| 2 | (Germany) (Austria) | Philipp Kohlschreiber; Jürgen Melzer | 6^{4} 7^{7} | 4; 6 | 6; 4 | 6; 3 | 6; 3 |
| 3 | (Germany) (Austria) | Nicolas Kiefer / Philipp Kohlschreiber; Julian Knowle / Alexander Peya | 6; 3 | 7^{8} 6^{6} | 3; 6 | 6; 4 |
| 4 | (Germany) (Austria) | Nicolas Kiefer; Jürgen Melzer | 7^{7} 6^{3} | 6; 4 | 6; 4 |
| 5 | (Germany) (Austria) | Christopher Kas; Stefan Koubek | 2; 6 | 3; 6 |

=== Spain vs. Serbia ===
Spain
4
Parque Temático Terra Mítica, Benidorm, Spain
6–8 March 2009
Clay

Serbia
1

| | | | 1 | 2 | 3 | 4 | 5 |
|---|---|---|---|---|---|---|---|
| 1 | (Spain) (Serbia) | David Ferrer; Novak Djokovic | 6; 3 | 6; 3 | 7^{7} 6^{4} |
| 2 | (Spain) (Serbia) | Rafael Nadal; Janko Tipsarević | 6; 1 | 6; 0 | 6; 2 |
| 3 | (Spain) (Serbia) | Tommy Robredo / Feliciano López; Viktor Troicki / Nenad Zimonjić | 6^{5} 7^{7} | 4; 6 | 6^{7} 7^{9} |
| 4 | (Spain) (Serbia) | Rafael Nadal; Novak Djokovic | 6; 4 | 6; 4 | 6; 1 |
| 5 | (Spain) (Serbia) | David Ferrer; Viktor Troicki | 6; 0 | 6; 3 |

== Quarterfinals ==
=== Czech Republic vs. Argentina ===
Czech Republic
3
ČEZ Aréna, Ostrava, Czech Republic
10–12 July 2009
Carpet (i)

Argentina
2

| | | | 1 | 2 | 3 | 4 | 5 |
|---|---|---|---|---|---|---|---|
| 1 | (Czech Republic) (Argentina) | Tomáš Berdych; Juan Mónaco | 6; 4 | 2; 6 | 2; 6 | 6; 3 | 6; 2 |
| 2 | (Czech Republic) (Argentina) | Ivo Minář; Juan Martín del Potro | 1; 6 | 3; 6 | 3; 6 |
| 3 | (Czech Republic) (Argentina) | Tomáš Berdych / Radek Štěpánek; José Acasuso / Leonardo Mayer | 6; 1 | 6; 4 | 6; 3 |
| 4 | (Czech Republic) (Argentina) | Tomáš Berdych; Juan Martín del Potro | 4; 6 | 4; 6 | 4; 6 |
| 5 | (Czech Republic) (Argentina) | Radek Štěpánek; Juan Mónaco | 7^{7} 6^{5} | 6; 3 | 6; 2 |

=== Croatia vs. United States ===
Croatia
3
Višenamjenska Sportska Dvorana Žatika, Poreč, Croatia
10–12 July 2009
Clay (i)

United States
2

| | | | 1 | 2 | 3 | 4 | 5 |
|---|---|---|---|---|---|---|---|
| 1 | (Croatia) (United States) | Ivo Karlović; James Blake | 6^{5} 7^{7} | 4; 6 | 6; 3 | 7^{7} 6^{3} | 7; 5 |
| 2 | (Croatia) (United States) | Marin Čilić; Mardy Fish | 4; 6 | 6; 3 | 6^{3} 7^{7} | 6; 1 | 8; 6 |
| 3 | (Croatia) (United States) | Roko Karanušić / Lovro Zovko; Bob Bryan / Mike Bryan | 3; 6 | 1; 6 | 3; 6 |
| 4 | (Croatia) (United States) | Marin Čilić; James Blake | 6; 3 | 6; 3 | 4; 6 | 6; 2 |
| 5 | (Croatia) (United States) | Roko Karanušić; Bob Bryan | 7; 5 | 3; 6 | 6^{4} 7^{7} |

=== Israel vs. Russia ===
Israel
4
Yad Eliyahu Arena, Tel Aviv, Israel
10–12 July 2009
Hard (i)

Russia
1

| | | | 1 | 2 | 3 | 4 | 5 |
|---|---|---|---|---|---|---|---|---|
| 1 | (Israel) (Russia) | Harel Levy; Igor Andreev | 6; 4 | 6; 2 | 4; 6 | 6; 2 |
| 2 | (Israel) (Russia) | Dudi Sela; Mikhail Youzhny | 3; 6 | 6; 1 | 6; 0 | 7; 5 |
| 3 | (Israel) (Russia) | Jonathan Erlich / Andy Ram; Igor Kunitsyn / Marat Safin | 6; 3 | 6; 4 | 6^{3} 7^{7} | 4; 6 | 6; 4 |
| 4 | (Israel) (Russia) | Dudi Sela; Igor Andreev | 3; 4 | | | | | retired |
| 5 | (Israel) (Russia) | Harel Levy; Igor Kunitsyn | 6; 4 | 4; 6 | 7^{7} 6^{2} |

=== Spain vs. Germany ===
Spain
3
Plaza de Toros de Puerto Banús, Marbella, Spain
10–12 July 2009
Clay

Germany
2

| | | | 1 | 2 | 3 | 4 | 5 |
|---|---|---|---|---|---|---|---|
| 1 | (Spain) (Germany) | Fernando Verdasco; Andreas Beck | 6; 0 | 3; 6 | 6^{4} 7^{7} | 6; 2 | 6; 1 |
| 2 | (Spain) (Germany) | Tommy Robredo; Philipp Kohlschreiber | 3; 6 | 4; 6 | 4; 6 |
| 3 | (Spain) (Germany) | Feliciano López / Fernando Verdasco; Nicolas Kiefer / Mischa Zverev | 6; 3 | 7^{7} 6^{1} | 6^{6} 7^{8} | 6; 3 |
| 4 | (Spain) (Germany) | Fernando Verdasco; Philipp Kohlschreiber | 4; 6 | 2; 6 | 6; 1 | 6; 2 | 6; 8 |
| 5 | (Spain) (Germany) | Juan Carlos Ferrero; Andreas Beck | 6; 4 | 6; 4 | 6; 4 |

== Semifinals ==
=== Croatia vs. Czech Republic ===
Croatia
1
Sportska Dvorana 'Zatika', Poreč, Croatia
18–20 September 2009
Clay (i)

Czech Republic
4

| | | | 1 | 2 | 3 | 4 | 5 |
|---|---|---|---|---|---|---|---|
| 1 | (Croatia) (Czech Republic) | Ivo Karlović; Radek Štěpánek | 7^{7} 6^{5} | 6^{5} 7^{7} | 6^{6} 7^{8} | 7^{7} 6^{2} | 14; 16 |
| 2 | (Croatia) (Czech Republic) | Marin Čilić; Tomáš Berdych | 3; 6 | 3; 6 | 6; 3 | 6; 4 | 3; 6 |
| 3 | (Croatia) (Czech Republic) | Marin Čilić / Lovro Zovko; Tomáš Berdych / Radek Štěpánek | 1; 6 | 3; 6 | 4; 6 |
| 4 | (Croatia) (Czech Republic) | Roko Karanušić; Jan Hájek | 6^{4} 7^{7} | 4; 6 |
| 5 | (Croatia) (Czech Republic) | Lovro Zovko; Lukáš Dlouhý | 6; 3 | 6; 4 |

=== Spain vs. Israel ===
Spain
4
Polaris World la Torre Golf Resort, Murcia, Spain
18–20 September 2009
Clay

Israel
1

| | | | 1 | 2 | 3 | 4 | 5 |
|---|---|---|---|---|---|---|---|
| 1 | (Spain) (Israel) | David Ferrer; Harel Levy | 6; 1 | 6; 4 | 6; 3 |
| 2 | (Spain) (Israel) | Juan Carlos Ferrero; Dudi Sela | 6; 4 | 6; 2 | 6; 0 |
| 3 | (Spain) (Israel) | Feliciano López / Tommy Robredo; Jonathan Erlich / Andy Ram | 7^{8} 6^{6} | 6^{7} 7^{9} | 6; 4 | 6; 2 |
| 4 | (Spain) (Israel) | David Ferrer; Andy Ram | 6; 3 | 6; 1 |
| 5 | (Spain) (Israel) | Feliciano López; Harel Levy | 5; 7 | 2; 6 |

== Final ==
=== Spain vs. Czech Republic ===
Spain
5
Palau Sant Jordi, Barcelona, Spain
4–6 December 2009
Clay (i)

Czech Republic
0

| | | | 1 | 2 | 3 | 4 | 5 |
|---|---|---|---|---|---|---|---|
| 1 | (Spain) (Czech Republic) | Rafael Nadal; Tomáš Berdych | 7; 5 | 6; 0 | 6; 2 |
| 2 | (Spain) (Czech Republic) | David Ferrer; Radek Štěpánek | 1; 6 | 2; 6 | 6; 4 | 6; 4 | 8; 6 |
| 3 | (Spain) (Czech Republic) | Feliciano López / Fernando Verdasco; Tomáš Berdych / Radek Štěpánek | 7^{9} 6^{7} | 7; 5 | 6; 2 |
| 4 | (Spain) (Czech Republic) | Rafael Nadal; Jan Hájek | 6; 3 | 6; 4 |
| 5 | (Spain) (Czech Republic) | David Ferrer; Lukáš Dlouhý | 6; 4 | 6; 2 |
