= 2013 Davis Cup World Group play-offs =

The 2013 Davis Cup World Group play-offs were held from September 13 to 15. They were the main play-offs of the 2013 Davis Cup. Winners of the playoffs advanced to the 2014 World Group, and the losers were relegated to their respective Zonal Regions I.

== Teams ==
Bold indicates team has qualified for the 2014 Davis Cup World Group.

From World Group

- **Spain**
- Austria
- Croatia
- **Switzerland**
- **Germany**
- **Belgium**
- Brazil
- Israel

From Americas Group I

- Colombia
- Ecuador

From Asia/Oceania Group I

- **Australia**
- **Japan**

From Europe/Africa Group I

- **Netherlands**
- Poland
- Ukraine
- **Great Britain**

== Results ==
Date: 13–15 September

The eight losing teams in the World Group first round ties and eight winners of the Zonal Group I final round ties competed in the World Group play-offs for spots in the 2014 World Group. The draw took place April 11 in London.

**Seeded teams**

1. Spain
2. Austria
3. Croatia
4. Switzerland
5. Germany
6. Australia
7. Belgium
8. Japan

**Unseeded teams**

- Brazil
- Colombia
- Ecuador
- Great Britain
- Israel
- Netherlands
- Poland
- Ukraine

Home team	Score	Visiting team	Location	Venue	Door	Surface
**Spain**	5−0	Ukraine	Madrid	Caja Mágica	Outdoor	Clay
**Netherlands**	5−0	Austria	Groningen	Martiniplaza	Indoor	Clay
Croatia	1−4	**Great Britain**	Umag	ITC Stella Maris	Outdoor	Clay
**Switzerland**	4−1	Ecuador	Neuchâtel	Patinoire du Littoral	Indoor	Hard
**Germany**	4−1	Brazil	Neu-Ulm	Ratiopharm Arena	Indoor	Hard
Poland	1−4	**Australia**	Warsaw	Torwar Hall	Indoor	Clay
**Belgium**	3−2	Israel	Antwerp	Lotto Arena	Indoor	Clay
**Japan**	3−2	Colombia	Tokyo	Ariake Coliseum	Outdoor	Hard

- Belgium, Germany, Spain and Switzerland remained in the World Group in 2014.
- Australia, Great Britain, Japan and Netherlands were promoted to the World Group in 2014.
- Colombia, Ecuador, Poland and Ukraine remained in Zonal Group I in 2014.
- Austria, Brazil, Croatia and Israel were relegated to Zonal Group I in 2014.

== Playoff results ==
=== Spain vs. Ukraine ===
Spain
5
Caja Mágica, Madrid, Spain
13–15 September 2013
Clay

Ukraine
0

			1	2	3	4	5
1	(Spain) (Ukraine)	**Fernando Verdasco**; Alexandr Dolgopolov	3; **6**	**6**; 4	**6**; 4	**6**; 2
2	(Spain) (Ukraine)	**Rafael Nadal**; Sergiy Stakhovsky	**6**; 0	**6**; 0	**6**; 4
3	(Spain) (Ukraine)	**Marc López / Rafael Nadal**; Denys Molchanov / Sergiy Stakhovsky	**6**; 2	6^{6} **7^{8}**	**6**; 3	**6**; 4
4	(Spain) (Ukraine)	**Marc López**; Denys Molchanov	**6**; 3	**6**; 3
5	(Spain) (Ukraine)	**Fernando Verdasco**; Vladyslav Manafov	**6**; 2	**6**; 1

=== Netherlands vs. Austria ===
Netherlands
5
MartiniPlaza, Groningen, Netherlands
13–15 September 2013
Clay (i)

Austria
0

			1	2	3	4	5
1	(Netherlands) (Austria)	**Robin Haase**; Oliver Marach	**6**; 4	**6**; 3	**6**; 1
2	(Netherlands) (Austria)	**Thiemo de Bakker**; Jürgen Melzer	5; **7**	**7**; 5	5; **7**	**6**; 4	**6**; 1
3	(Netherlands) (Austria)	**Robin Haase / Jean-Julien Rojer**; Oliver Marach / Julian Knowle	4; **6**	**6**; 3	**6**; 4	**7**; 5
4	(Netherlands) (Austria)	**Jesse Huta Galung**; Jürgen Melzer	3; **6**	**7**; 5	**6**; 3
5	(Netherlands) (Austria)	**Thiemo de Bakker**; Oliver Marach						**w/o**

=== Croatia vs. Great Britain ===
Croatia
1
Stadion Stella Maris, Umag, Croatia
13–15 September 2013
Clay

Great Britain
4

			1	2	3	4	5
1	(Croatia) (United Kingdom)	Borna Ćorić; **Andy Murray**	3; **6**	0; **6**	3; **6**
2	(Croatia) (United Kingdom)	**Ivan Dodig**; Dan Evans	**6**; 3	**6**; 2	**6**; 3
3	(Croatia) (United Kingdom)	Ivan Dodig / Mate Pavić; **Colin Fleming / Andy Murray**	3; **6**	2; **6**	**7^{8}** 6^{6}	1; **6**
4	(Croatia) (United Kingdom)	Ivan Dodig; **Andy Murray**	4; **6**	2; **6**	4; **6**
5	(Croatia) (United Kingdom)	Mate Pavić; **Dan Evans**	4; **6**	6^{4} **7^{7}**

=== Switzerland vs. Ecuador ===
Switzerland
4
Patinoire du Littoral, Neuchâtel, Switzerland
13–15 September 2013
Hard (i)

Ecuador
1

			1	2	3	4	5
1	(Switzerland) (Ecuador)	**Stanislas Wawrinka**; Emilio Gómez	**6**; 4	**6**; 3	**6**; 3
2	(Switzerland) (Ecuador)	**Marco Chiudinelli**; Júlio César Campozano	3; **6**	**6**; 1	**6**; 3	**7^{9}** 6^{7}
3	(Switzerland) (Ecuador)	**Michael Lammer / Stanislas Wawrinka**; Emilio Gómez / Roberto Quiroz	**6**; 3	**6**; 4	3; **6**	6^{7} **7^{9}**	**6**; 4
4	(Switzerland) (Ecuador)	**Michael Lammer**; Roberto Quiroz	**6**; 3	2; **6**	**6**; 2
5	(Switzerland) (Ecuador)	Marco Chiudinelli; **Gonzalo Escobar**	0; **6**	5; **7**

=== Germany vs. Brazil ===
Germany
4
Ratiopharm Arena, Neu-Ulm, Germany
13–15 September 2013
Hard (i)

Brazil
1

			1	2	3	4	5
1	(Germany) (Brazil)	**Philipp Kohlschreiber**; Rogério Dutra da Silva	**6**; 3	**7**; 5	**6**; 4
2	(Germany) (Brazil)	**Florian Mayer**; Thomaz Bellucci	**6**; 4	**6**; 1	**6**; 2
3	(Germany) (Brazil)	Daniel Brands / Martin Emmrich; **Marcelo Melo / Bruno Soares**	3; **6**	4; **6**	4; **6**
4	(Germany) (Brazil)	**Daniel Brands**; Thomaz Bellucci	**6**; 4	**6**; 2	**6**; 3
5	(Germany) (Brazil)	**Florian Mayer**; Rogério Dutra da Silva	**6**; 4	**6**; 4

=== Poland vs. Australia ===
Poland
1
Torwar Hall, Warsaw, Poland
13–15 September 2013
Clay (i)

Australia
4

			1	2	3	4	5
1	(Poland) (Australia)	Łukasz Kubot; **Lleyton Hewitt**	1; **6**	3; **6**	2; **6**
2	(Poland) (Australia)	Michał Przysiężny; **Bernard Tomic**	5; **7**	6^{1} **7^{7}**	4; **6**
3	(Poland) (Australia)	**Mariusz Fyrstenberg / Marcin Matkowski**; Chris Guccione / Nick Kyrgios	5; **7**	**6**; 4	**6**; 2	6^{5} **7^{7}**	**6**; 4
4	(Poland) (Australia)	Łukasz Kubot; **Bernard Tomic**	4; **6**	6^{5} **7^{7}**	3; **6**
5	(Poland) (Australia)	Michał Przysiężny; **Nick Kyrgios**	1; 4					**retired**

=== Belgium vs. Israel ===
Belgium
3
Lotto Arena, Antwerp, Belgium
12–15 September 2013
Clay (i)

Israel
2

			1	2	3	4	5
1	(Belgium) (Israel)	**Steve Darcis**; Dudi Sela	**6**; 1	**6**; 2	**6**; 2
2	(Belgium) (Israel)	Ruben Bemelmans; **Amir Weintraub**	3; **6**	**6**; 2	**7^{7}** 6^{2}	6^{4} **7^{7}**	4; **6**
3	(Belgium) (Israel)	Steve Darcis / Olivier Rochus; **Jonathan Erlich / Andy Ram**	3; **6**	**7**; 5	**6**; 1	5; **7**	3; **6**
4	(Belgium) (Israel)	**Ruben Bemelmans**; Dudi Sela	**7**; 5	3; **6**	**6**; 0	**6**; 4
5	(Belgium) (Israel)	**Steve Darcis**; Amir Weintraub	**6**; 2	**6**; 2	**6**; 2

=== Japan vs. Colombia ===
Japan
3
Ariake Coliseum, Tokyo, Japan
13–15 September 2013
Hard

Colombia
2

			1	2	3	4	5
1	(Japan) (Colombia)	**Kei Nishikori**; Alejandro Falla	**6**; 3	**6**; 4	**6**; 4
2	(Japan) (Colombia)	Go Soeda; **Santiago Giraldo**	4; **6**	**6**; 3	5; **7**	**6**; 3	1; **6**
3	(Japan) (Colombia)	Tatsuma Ito / Yuichi Sugita; **Juan Sebastián Cabal / Robert Farah**	1; **6**	2; **6**	1; **6**
4	(Japan) (Colombia)	**Kei Nishikori**; Santiago Giraldo	**6**; 1	**6**; 2	**6**; 4
5	(Japan) (Colombia)	**Go Soeda**; Alejandro Falla	4; **6**	**6**; 4	**6**; 3	**6**; 3
