= 2018 Davis Cup Europe/Africa Zone Group I =

International tennis competition

The Europe/Africa Zone was one of the three regional zones of the 2018 Davis Cup.

In the Europe/Africa Zone there were three different tiers, called groups, in which teams competed against each other to advance to the upper tier. Winners in Group I advanced to the World Group play-offs, along with losing teams from the World Group first round. Teams who lost their respective ties competed in the relegation play-offs, with winning teams remaining in Group I, whereas teams who lost their play-offs were relegated to the Europe/Africa Zone Group II in 2019.

== Participating nations ==
Seeds: All seeds and Bosnia and Herzegovina received a bye into the second round.

1. Czech Republic
2. Russia
3. Slovakia
4. Portugal

Remaining nations:

- Austria
- Belarus
- Bosnia and Herzegovina
- Israel
- South Africa
- Sweden
- Ukraine

=== Draw ===
Second Round Play-offs
Lisbon, Portugal (clay)
South Africa	0
4	Portugal	4
Bratislava, Slovakia (indoor clay)
3	Slovakia	3
Belarus	1

First Round Play-offs
bye
South Africa
Bucha, Ukraine (hard)
4	Portugal	1
Ukraine	3
bye
3	Slovakia
Moscow, Russia (indoor hard)
Belarus	2
2	Russia	3

First Round
1	Czech Republic
bye
Centurion, South Africa (hard)
South Africa	2
Israel	3
4	Portugal
bye
Dnipro, Ukraine (indoor hard)
Ukraine	2
Sweden	3
Bosnia and Herzegovina
bye
bye
3	Slovakia
Sankt Pölten, Austria (indoor clay)
Austria	5
Belarus	0
bye
2	Russia

Second Round
Ostrava, Czech Republic (indoor clay)
1	Czech Republic	3
Israel	1
Stockholm, Sweden (indoor hard)
4	Portugal	2
Sweden	3
Bratislava, Slovakia (indoor clay)
Bosnia and Herzegovina	3
3	Slovakia	2
Moscow, Russia (indoor hard)
Austria	3
2	Russia	1

- South Africa and Belarus relegated to Group II in 2019.
- Czech Republic, Sweden, Bosnia and Herzegovina, and Austria advance to World Group Play-off.

== First round ==
=== South Africa vs. Israel ===
South Africa
2
Irene Country Club, Centurion, South Africa, South Africa
2–3 February
Hard (i)

Israel
3

			1	2	3
1	(South Africa) (Israel)	Lloyd Harris; Edan Leshem	7; 5	6; 4
2	(South Africa) (Israel)	Nicolaas Scholtz; Dudi Sela	1; 6	7; 6	5; 7
3	(South Africa) (Israel)	Raven Klaasen / Ruan Roelofse; Jonathan Erlich / Dudi Sela	5; 7	6; 4	6; 4
4	(South Africa) (Israel)	Lloyd Harris; Dudi Sela	6; 7	1; 6
5	(South Africa) (Israel)	Nicolaas Scholtz; Edan Leshem	3; 6	5; 7

=== Ukraine vs. Sweden ===
Ukraine
2
Megaron Tennis Club, Dnipro, Ukraine
2–3 February
Hard (i)

Sweden
3

			1	2	3
1	(Ukraine) (Sweden)	Sergiy Stakhovsky; Mikael Ymer	6^{6} 7^{8}	2; 6
2	(Ukraine) (Sweden)	Artem Smirnov; Elias Ymer	2; 6	3; 6
3	(Ukraine) (Sweden)	Denys Molchanov / Sergiy Stakhovsky; Markus Eriksson / Andreas Siljeström	7^{7} 6^{4}	4; 6	6; 2
4	(Ukraine) (Sweden)	Sergiy Stakhovsky; Elias Ymer	6; 4	6; 4
5	(Ukraine) (Sweden)	Artem Smirnov; Mikael Ymer	4; 6	2; 6

=== Austria vs. Belarus ===
Austria
5
VAZ St. Pölten, Sankt Pölten, Austria
2–3 February
Clay (i)

Belarus
0

			1	2	3
1	(Austria) (Belarus)	Gerald Melzer; Ilya Ivashka	2; 6	7; 5	6; 4
2	(Austria) (Belarus)	Dominic Thiem; Dzmitry Zhyrmont	6; 3	6; 3
3	(Austria) (Belarus)	Oliver Marach / Philipp Oswald; Ilya Ivashka / Andrei Vasilevski	6; 3	7^{7} 6^{5}
4	(Austria) (Belarus)	Dominic Thiem; Ilya Ivashka	6; 4	7^{7} 6^{5}
5	(Austria) (Belarus)	Dennis Novak; Yaraslav Shyla	7^{7} 6^{1}	6; 0

== Second round ==
=== Czech Republic vs. Israel ===
Czech Republic
3
RT Torax Arena, Ostrava, Czech Republic
6–7 April
Clay (i)

Israel
1

			1	2	3
1	(Czech Republic) (Israel)	Jiří Veselý; Edan Leshem	6; 0	6; 1
2	(Czech Republic) (Israel)	Adam Pavlásek; Dudi Sela	3; 6	6; 3	6; 1
3	(Czech Republic) (Israel)	Adam Pavlásek / Jiří Veselý; Jonathan Erlich / Yshai Oliel	6; 2	3; 6	6; 3
4	(Czech Republic) (Israel)	Václav Šafránek; Yshai Oliel	5; 7	3; 6
5	(Czech Republic) (Israel)	Adam Pavlásek; Edan Leshem				not played

=== Sweden vs. Portugal ===
Sweden
3
Kungliga tennishallen, Stockholm, Sweden
6–7 April
Hard (i)

Portugal
2

			1	2	3
1	(Sweden) (Portugal)	Mikael Ymer; João Sousa	4; 6	4; 6
2	(Sweden) (Portugal)	Elias Ymer; Gastão Elias	7^{13} 6^{11}	6; 4
3	(Sweden) (Portugal)	Markus Eriksson / Robert Lindstedt; Gastão Elias / João Sousa	7^{8} 6^{6}	6; 2
4	(Sweden) (Portugal)	Elias Ymer; João Sousa	4; 6	4; 6
5	(Sweden) (Portugal)	Mikael Ymer; Gastão Elias	6; 3	6; 4

=== Slovakia vs. Bosnia and Herzegovina ===
Slovakia
2
Aegon Arena, Bratislava, Slovakia
6–7 April
Clay (i)

Bosnia and Herzegovina
3

			1	2	3
1	(Slovakia) (Bosnia and Herzegovina)	Norbert Gombos; Damir Džumhur	4; 6	1; 6
2	(Slovakia) (Bosnia and Herzegovina)	Martin Kližan; Mirza Bašić	7^{7} 6^{5}	6; 1
3	(Slovakia) (Bosnia and Herzegovina)	Andrej Martin / Igor Zelenay; Mirza Bašić / Tomislav Brkić	2; 6	4; 6
4	(Slovakia) (Bosnia and Herzegovina)	Martin Kližan; Damir Džumhur	6; 3	7^{7} 6^{3}
5	(Slovakia) (Bosnia and Herzegovina)	Jozef Kovalík; Mirza Bašić	6^{0} 7^{7}	6; 2	3; 6

=== Russia vs. Austria ===
Russia
1
Luzhniki Small Sports Arena, Moscow, Russia
6–7 April
Hard (i)

Austria
3

			1	2	3
1	(Russia) (Austria)	Andrey Rublev; Dennis Novak	6^{5} 7^{7}	4; 6
2	(Russia) (Austria)	Daniil Medvedev; Sebastian Ofner	6; 1	6; 2
3	(Russia) (Austria)	Karen Khachanov / Andrey Rublev; Jürgen Melzer / Philipp Oswald	3; 6	6^{3} 7^{7}
4	(Russia) (Austria)	Evgeny Donskoy; Jürgen Melzer	3; 6	6; 3	3; 6
5	(Russia) (Austria)	Daniil Medvedev; Dennis Novak				not played

== First round play-offs ==
=== Ukraine vs. Portugal ===
Ukraine
3
Campa Tennis Club, Bucha, Ukraine
14–15 September
Hard

Portugal
1

			1	2	3
1	(Ukraine) (Portugal)	Illya Marchenko; João Sousa	6; 4	2; 6	3; 6
2	(Ukraine) (Portugal)	Sergiy Stakhovsky; Pedro Sousa	6; 3	6; 2
3	(Ukraine) (Portugal)	Denys Molchanov / Sergiy Stakhovsky; Gastão Elias / João Sousa	6; 4	3; 6	7^{7} 6^{5}
4	(Ukraine) (Portugal)	Sergiy Stakhovsky; João Sousa	6; 2	4; 6	6; 4
5	(Ukraine) (Portugal)	Illya Marchenko; Pedro Sousa				not played

=== Russia vs. Belarus ===
Russia
3
Luzhniki Small Sports Arena, Moscow, Russia
14–15 September
Hard (i)

Belarus
2

			1	2	3
1	(Russia) (Belarus)	Karen Khachanov; Egor Gerasimov	7^{7} 6^{4}	6; 3
2	(Russia) (Belarus)	Daniil Medvedev; Ilya Ivashka	6^{2} 7^{7}	4; 6
3	(Russia) (Belarus)	Karen Khachanov / Andrey Rublev; Max Mirnyi / Andrei Vasilevski	5; 7	3; 6
4	(Russia) (Belarus)	Karen Khachanov; Ilya Ivashka	6; 2	6; 4
5	(Russia) (Belarus)	Daniil Medvedev; Egor Gerasimov	7^{7} 6^{4}	3; 6	6; 3

== 2nd round play-offs ==
=== Portugal vs. South Africa ===
Portugal
4
Club Internacional de Foot-ball, Lisbon, Portugal
19–20 October 2018
Clay

South Africa
0

			1	2	3
1	(Portugal) (South Africa)	Pedro Sousa; Lloyd Harris	6; 1	6; 1
2	(Portugal) (South Africa)	João Sousa; Nicolaas Scholtz	6; 3	6; 2
3	(Portugal) (South Africa)	Gastão Elias / João Sousa; Raven Klaasen / Ruan Roelofse	6; 4	6^{4} 7^{7}	6; 2
4	(Portugal) (South Africa)	João Domingues; Philip Henning	6; 4	6; 0
5	(Portugal) (South Africa)	Pedro Sousa; Nicolaas Scholtz				not played

=== Slovakia vs. Belarus ===
Slovakia
3
Aegon Arena, Bratislava, Slovakia
26–27 October 2018
Clay (i)

Belarus
1

			1	2	3
1	(Slovakia) (Belarus)	Martin Kližan; Alexander Zgirovsky	6; 1	6; 4
2	(Slovakia) (Belarus)	Norbert Gombos; Egor Gerasimov	6; 3	4; 6	4; 6
3	(Slovakia) (Belarus)	Martin Kližan / Filip Polášek; Max Mirnyi / Andrei Vasilevski	6^{5} 7^{7}	6; 4	6; 3
4	(Slovakia) (Belarus)	Martin Kližan; Egor Gerasimov	6; 4	6; 3
5	(Slovakia) (Belarus)	Norbert Gombos; Alexander Zgirovsky				not played
