= Israel Davis Cup team =

National sports team

Israel
- Captain: Noam Okun
- Nations Ranking: 30 (20 September 2021)
- Highest ranking: 6 (July 14, 2009)
- Colors: Blue & White
- First year: 1949
- Years played: 65
- Ties played (W–L): 116 (50–66)
- Years in World Group: 10 (3–10)
- Best finish: Semifinal (2009)
- Most total wins: Shlomo Glickstein (44–22)
- Most singles wins: Shlomo Glickstein (31–13)
- Most doubles wins: Jonathan Erlich (24–12)
- Best doubles team: Jonathan Erlich & Andy Ram (19–5)
- Most ties played: Jonathan Erlich (36)
- Most years played: Jonathan Erlich (19)

The Israel men's national tennis team (Hebrew: נבחרת גביע דייוויס של ישראל) represents Israel in Davis Cup tennis competition and is governed by the Israel Tennis Association. As of June 2020, Jonathan Erlich became Captain of the team.

The team plays primarily in Canada Stadium, which is the main venue of the Tennis Center in Ramat Hasharon, Tel Aviv District, Israel. The stadium is known for its high intensity, tough crowd, and good home environment. The surface is considered hard by world standards, a feature that plays to the advantage of Israeli competitors already used to it. The tough surface and even tougher crowd have earned the venue the nickname "Israhell" among visiting players.

Over the protests of all four of their own players (including Harel Levy, who said: ""Only Ramat Hasharon. We're not even thinking about Nokia. There's no reason to play against the Russians indoors – we love Ramat Hasharon"), who preferred to play outdoors in the heat on the hard court that they are accustomed to, the ITA moved the tie against Russia in 2009 to the larger indoor Nokia Arena. But the ITA was sensitive to the fact that the indoor arena has a capacity of 11,000 – more than double that of the Canada Stadium. ITA CEO Moshe Haviv denied that his prime consideration was the extra money such a move would bring in, and said the larger stadium would give more Israelis the chance to see the national team play, and allow them to watch the sport in more comfortable conditions. This was the second time Israel played a home match at Yad Eliyahu Arena, the previous one have been against France in 1989.

== History ==
Israel competed in its first Davis Cup in 1949.

Israel squad at 1949 Davis Cup
Player
Arie Avidan-Weiss	Singles
Yehuda Finkelkraut	Singles & Doubles
Rafael Gornitsky	Doubles
Israel squad against Denmark in 28–30; April, 1949

=== 2007 ===
==== Chile ====
Before the Chile-Israel Davis Cup match began in September 2007, even The Jewish Chronicle wrote: "Led by Fernando González (6) and Nicolás Massú (72), it is hard to see Israel's Dudi Sela (105) and Noam Okun (186), backed up by doubles specialists Andy Ram and Jonathan Erlich, winning the contest. González and Massú are also a formidable doubles partnership, having won the Olympic gold medal in Athens in 2004."

That same month, before playing Nicolás Massú of Chile in the first match of the tie, Sela said: "We like being the underdog. I'm very pleased with the fact that I'm playing first and I'm very confident of claiming the win." He then proceeded to upset Massu, ranked # 72 in the world, and formerly ranked # 9 in the world, in a 5-hour 7-minute match, 6–3, 6–4, 6–7 (3), 6–4. "This is definitely the biggest win in my career", Sela said afterwards. Later in that Davis Cup tie, Dudi Sela defeated # 7 in the world Fernando González 4–6, 7–6 (5), 5–7, 7–6 (7), 6–3 in a 5-hour 1-minute match. It is arguably the greatest tennis match ever played in Israel. The victory lifted Israel over Chile and into 2008's World Group. Gonzalez was at the time the highest-ranked player Sela had ever beaten in his career (he later beat world # 5 David Ferrer in Beijing in September 2008), and his 6th upset of a top-100 player in the first 9 months of the year. Elated, Sela said "This is definitely the happiest day of my life." Sela was congratulated over the phone by Prime Minister Ehud Olmert and President Shimon Peres after the match.

=== 2008 ===
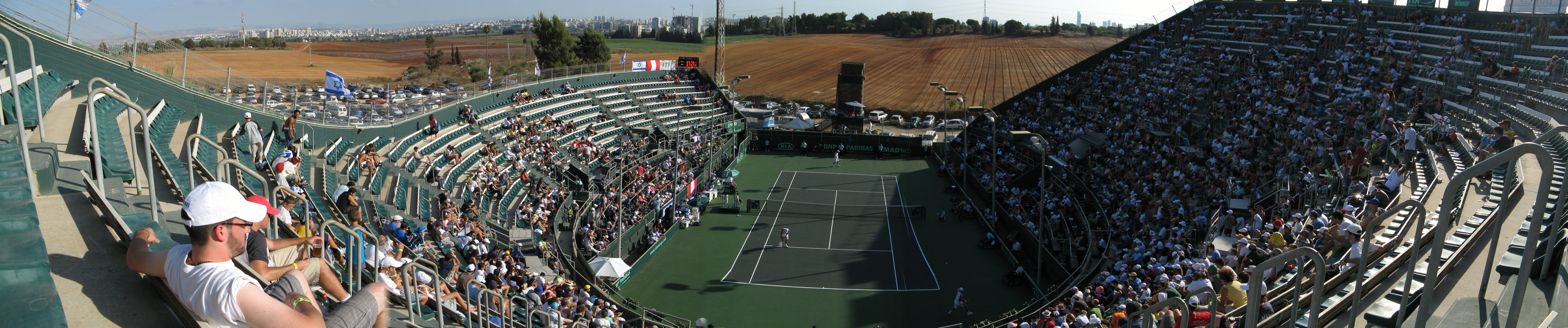
Canada Stadium in Ramat Hasharon; 2008

==== Sweden ====
In the 2008 World Group, Israel hosted Sweden in Ramat HaSharon. Sela started with a win against world # 71 Jonas Björkman 7–6, 6–3, 6–1, and gave Israel an advantage of 1–0. He then lost to world # 60 Thomas Johansson 7–6 (6), 6–1, 7–5, as Israel lost the tie 3–2.

==== Peru ====
In the September 2008 World Group Playoffs against the Peru Davis Cup team at Ramat Hasharon, Dudi Sela beat Iván Miranda in the first singles match, but Harel Levy then lost to Luis Horna. Levy then paired with Andy Ram to win the doubles tie, before Sela defeated Horna in four sets to ensure the Israeli national tennis team victory over Peru and send it through to the 2009 Davis Cup World Group. Noam Okun then defeated Miranda to close out a 4–1 victory. Horna praised the 91st-ranked Sela, saying: "His ranking is not reflective, he will be close to the top 50 in the world." Horna presciently opined that the Israelis could advance to the quarters, or even the semifinals, saying that Israel is a "great team". Israeli captain Eyal Ran said: "It's an amazing effort for a small country like Israel to be among the top 16 tennis nations in the world. It's hard to take in, but I think we deserve it."

=== 2009 ===
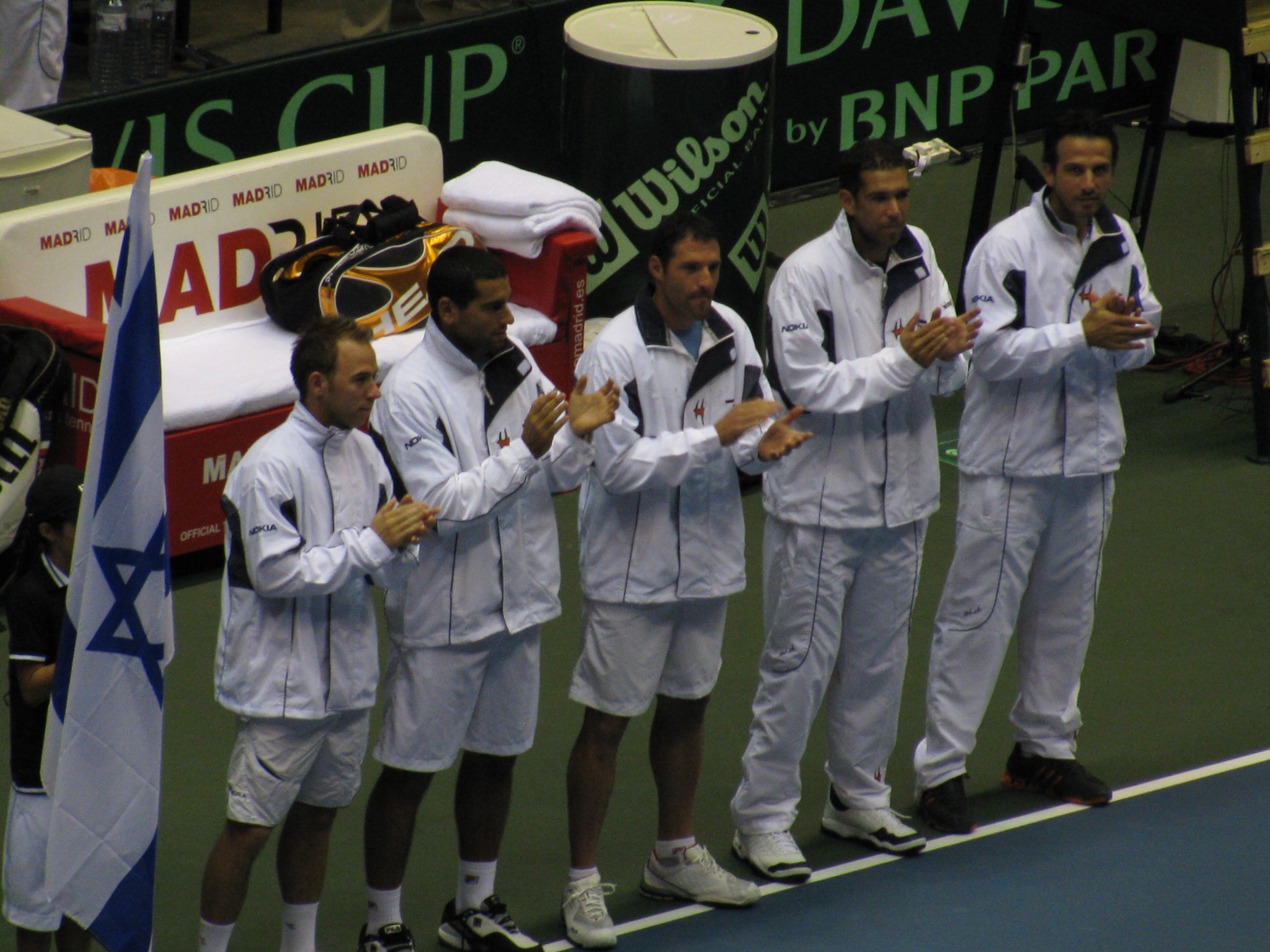
Israel Davis Cup team in 2009 (from left to right):Dudi Sela, Andy Ram, Jonathan Erlich, Harel Levy and the captain Eyal Ran

==== Sweden ====
In the 2009 World Group Playoffs in March 2009, Israel again faced seven-time Davis Cup champion Sweden. An amusing moment occurred during Sela's opening match when the Israeli fans, to the Que Sera, Sera tune of the Doris Day hit song from the 1950s, sang "Dudi Sela, Sela, whatever will be will be." Sela led the Israeli team to a come-from-behind 3–2 victory over the 7-time Davis Cup champion Swedes at Baltic Hall in Malmö, Sweden, to advance in the 2009 Davis Cup.

Sela won each of his singles matches in 5 sets, coming from behind to defeat Andreas Vinciguerra in his hometown 4–6, 6–3, 3–6, 6–3, 11–9, and came from behind to stun 2002 Australian Open champion Thomas Johansson 3–6, 6–1, 4–6, 6–4, 6–2. Sela views it as the biggest win of his career to that point. In their 84-year Davis Cup history, the Swedes had never before lost a tie after holding a 2–1 lead. The last time Israel's Davis Cup team reached the level of being one of the top eight tennis nations in the world was in 1987, against India.

==== Russia ====
Israel (ranked 8th in the Davis Cup standings, with 5,394 points) hosted heavily favored Russia (which won in both 2002 and 2006, and was the top-ranked country in Davis Cup standings, with 27,897 points) in a Davis Cup quarterfinal tie in July 2009, on indoor hard courts at the Nokia Arena in Tel Aviv. Israel was represented by Dudi Sela, Harel Levy, Jonathan Erlich, and Andy Ram. Russia's lineup consisted of Marat Safin (# 24 in the world; former world # 1), Igor Andreev (26), Igor Kunitsyn (35), and Mikhail Youzhny (44; former world # 8). Sela said before the tie: "We feel we can beat the Russians." The stage was then set by Safin, who prior to the tie told the press: "With all due respect, Israel was lucky to get to the quarterfinals." The Israeli team's response was to beat the Russian team in each of their first three matches, thereby winning the tie. Levy was aware that the Russians thought he was incapable of playing at their level, let alone beating Russia's top player, Andreev. Levy, ranked world # 210, beat Andreev, world # 24, 6–4, 6–2, 4–6, 6–2 in the opening match. Levy said: "I had a feeling Andreev couldn't hurt me in any way, while I could do almost anything, and that made me very calm. I forced him to feel very uncomfortable on the court, lowering his confidence, and his game became more simple." Sela (# 33) followed by beating Russian Youzhny 3–6, 6–1, 6–0, 7–5. Israeli captain Eyal Ran likened his players to two fighter jets on court, saying: "I felt as if I had two F-16s out there today, they played amazingly well." The 10,500 spectators were the largest crowd ever for a tennis match in Israel.

The next day Israelis Ram and Erlich beat Safin and Kunitsyn 6–3, 6–4, 6–7 (3), 4–6, 6–4 in front of a boisterous crowd of over 10,000. "I started to cry like a little boy", said Ram. "This is something I will cherish for all of my life", said Erlich. He added, "Everybody has dreams, but there are some you don't allow yourself to have, and beating Russia 3–0 was just like that .. but we have done it." Coach Ran was carried shoulder-high around the Tel Aviv stadium, as the 10,000-strong crowd applauded. Even the Saudi Gazette described the doubles match as a "thrilling" win. Ram said: "We have all grown up together since the age of 14. The reason we are in the semis is because we are a united team." Israeli Prime Minister Binyamin Netanyahu, noting that the team had "filled the nation with pride", said "We're once again on the map."

With the tie clinched for Israel, the reverse singles rubbers were "dead", and instead of best-of-five matches, best-of-three sets were played, with the outcomes of little to no importance. Israel wrapped up a 4–1 victory over Russia, as Levy defeated Kunitsyn 6–4, 4–6, 7–6 (2), while Sela retired with a wrist injury while down 3–4 in the first set against Andreev.

==== Spain ====
Israel next faced the defending champion Spain in Murcia, Spain on September 18–20, 2009, in Israel's first appearance in the Davis Cup semifinals.

Challenges for the Israelis included the facts that the Spanish fans are raucous, the tie was played on clay courts, and the Spanish team had won 16 straight Davis Cup ties at home. "It will be very difficult against Spain", Levy admitted. "We don't deceive ourselves... We'll prepare ourselves as much as possible, and we'll try to be the ones who finally break their crazy streak." "Everything is possible, everything starts at zero-zero", said Erlich. "Obviously it will be very difficult, especially playing there on clay. We do our best, we give our hearts and more than that we cannot do."

Despite the absence of Spain's two best players, Rafael Nadal and Fernando Verdasco, the home team took a 2–0 lead on the first day with straight sets wins for David Ferrer over Harel Levy and Juan Carlos Ferrero over Dudi Sela. In the doubles match, Tommy Robredo and Feliciano López beat Andy Ram and Jonathan Erlich in four sets and secured overall victory for Spain. The two dead singles were split: Ferrer defeated Ram and Harel Levy beat López, to make the final score 4–1 for Spain.

=== 2010 ===
==== Chile ====
Israel was drawn to play the first round tie away to Chile, in a reverse of the 2007 Qualifying Round match. The tie was delayed by one day because of the earthquake that hit Chile a few days earlier, and was played on March 6–8 at Coquimbo. Chile won the tie 4–1, with Andy Ram and Jonathan Erlich giving Israel the only rubber in the doubles match.

==== Austria ====
In the World Group Playoff Israel played against Austria, beginning September 16, 2010. Israel gave away a 1:0 and a 2:1 lead, and finally lost 2:3 against the Austrian team featuring world #13 Jürgen Melzer (world #6 in doubles) .

=== 2011 ===
==== Poland ====
Israel got a bye in the first round of the Europe/Africa Zone Group I.

It defeated Poland in the second round tie at home in March 2011. Dudi Sela defeated Marcin Gawron 6–1, 6–3, 6–4, and Amir Weintraub in his Davis Cup debut beat Jerzy Janowicz 4–6, 6–2, 6–2, 6–7 (4–7), 6–3. Andy Ram and Yoni Erlich then beat Marcin Matkowski and Mariusz Fyrstenberg 4–6, 6–4, 6–3, 6–1 at the Israel Tennis Center in Ramat Hasharon.

==== Canada ====
On September 16–18, 2011, Israel will play the Canada Davis Cup team at Canada Stadium in Ramat Hasharon, Israel. Canada is led by Milos Raonic (# 25 in May 2011; Canada's highest-ranked male player ever), who is joined by Vasek Pospisil (# 124 in September 2011). The teams split the first two matches in two upsets, as Pospisil defeated Dudi Sela 7–6 (4), 6–7 (6), 6–1, 6–7 (2), 6–3, and Amir Weintraub beat Raonic 5–7, 7–5, 6–3, 6–1.

== Results and fixtures ==
The following are lists of match results and scheduled matches for the current year.

Win Loss Fixture

=== 2025 ===
2025 Davis Cup Qualifiers first round

Israel
1
SEB Arena, Vilnius, Lithuania
31 January–1 February 2025
Hard (i)

Germany
3

			1	2	3
1	(Israel) (Germany)	Yshai Oliel; Maximilian Marterer	2; 6	7; 5	4; 6
2	(Israel) (Germany)	Daniel Cukierman; Yannick Hanfmann	4; 6	4; 6
3	(Israel) (Germany)	Daniel Cukierman / Amit Vales; Kevin Krawietz / Tim Pütz	0; 6	3; 6
4	(Israel) (Germany)	Ofek Shimanov; Daniel Masur	6^{2} 7^{7}	6; 3	10; 8
5	(Israel) (Germany)	Daniel Cukierman; Maximilian Marterer				not played

2025 Davis Cup World Group I

Canada

Canada
12–14 September 2025

Israel

		1	2	3
1	(Canada) (Israel)
2	(Canada) (Israel)
3	(Canada) (Israel)
4	(Canada) (Israel)
5	(Canada) (Israel)

== Players ==
=== Current team (2024) ===
- Yshai Oliel (singles)
- Orel Kimhi (singles)
- Daniel Cukierman (singles)
- Edan Leshem (doubles)
- Roy Stepanov (doubles)

== Historical results ==
Year	Competition	Stage	Date	Surface	Location	Opponent	Score	Result
2009	World Group	1st round	6–8 March	Carpet (i)	Malmö, Sweden	Sweden	3–2	Won
2009	World Group	Quarterfinals	10–12 July	Hard (i)	Tel Aviv, Israel	Russia	4–1	Won
2009	World Group	Semifinals	18–20 September	Clay	Murcia, Spain	Spain	1–4	Lost
2010	World Group	1st round	6–8 March	Clay	Coquimbo, Chile	Chile	1–4	Lost
2010	World Group play-offs		16–19 September	Hard (i)	Tel Aviv, Israel	Austria	2–3	Lost
2011	Europe/Africa Zone Group I	2nd round	6–8 March	Hard	Ramat HaSharon, Israel	Poland	3–2	Won
2011	World Group play-offs		16–18 September	Hard	Ramat HaSharon, Israel	Canada	2–3	Lost
2012	Europe/Africa Zone Group I	2nd round	6–8 April	Hard	Ramat HaSharon, Israel	Portugal	3–2	Won
2012	World Group play-offs		14–16 September	Hard	Tokyo, Japan	Japan	3–2	Won
2013	World Group	1st round	1–3 February	Hard (i)	Rouen, France	France	0–5	Lost
2013	World Group play-offs		12–15 September	Clay (i)	Antwerp, Belgium	Belgium	2–3	Lost
2014	Europe/Africa Zone Group I	2nd round	4–6 April	Clay	Portorož, Slovenia	Slovenia	3–1	Won
2014	World Group play-offs		12–14 September	Hard	Sunrise, United States	Argentina	2–3	Lost
2015	Europe/Africa Zone Group I	1st round	6–8 March	Hard (i)	Sibiu, Romania	Romania	0–5	Lost
2015	Europe/Africa Zone Group I	1st round play-offs	17–19 July	Hard (i)	Tel Aviv, Israel	Slovenia	3–2	Won
2016	Europe/Africa Zone Group I	1st round	4–6 March	Clay (i)	Budapest, Hungary	Hungary	2–3	Lost
2016	Europe/Africa Zone Group I	2nd round play-offs	28–30 October	Hard	Ramat HaSharon, Israel	Sweden	3–1	Won
2017	Europe/Africa Zone Group I	1st round	3–5 February	Clay (i)	Lisbon, Portugal	Portugal	0–5	Lost
2017	Europe/Africa Zone Group I	1st round play-offs	15–17 September	Hard	Ramat HaSharon, Israel	Ukraine	0–5	Lost
2017	Europe/Africa Zone Group I	2nd round play-offs	27–29 October	Hard	Ramat HaSharon, Israel	Romania	5–0	Won
2018	Europe/Africa Zone Group I	1st round	2–3 February	Hard (i)	Centurion, South Africa	South Africa	3–2	Won
2018	Europe/Africa Zone Group I	2nd round	6–7 April	Clay (i)	Ostrava, Czech Republic	Czech Republic	1–3	Lost
2019	Europe/Africa Zone Group I		13–14 September	Hard (i)	Stockholm, Sweden	Sweden	1–3	Lost
2020–21	World Group I play-offs		6–7 March 2020	Clay	Antalya, Turkey	Turkey	3–1	Won
2020–21	World Group I		5–6 March 2021	Hard (i)	Kyiv, Ukraine	Ukraine	2–3	Lost
2022	World Group I play-offs		4–5 March	Hard (i)	Ashdod, Israel	South Africa	3–1	Won
2022	World Group I		16–17 September	Hard (i)	Tel Aviv, Israel	Czech Republic	1–3	Lost
2023	World Group I play-offs		4–5 February	Hard (i)	Riga, Latvia	Latvia	3–2	Won
2023	World Group I		16–17 September	Hard (i)	Tel Aviv, Israel	Japan	3–2	Won
2024	Qualifying round		3–4 February	Hard (i)	Třinec, Czech Republic	Czech Republic	0–4	Lost
2024	World Group I		13–14 September	Hard	Larnaca, Cyprus	Ukraine	2–0	

== Records ==
Youngest Player: Yair Wertheimer, 16 years and 170 days

Oldest Player: Jonathan Erlich, 41 years and 1 day

Most wins: Shlomo Glickstein, 44 wins (22 losses)

Most singles wins: Glickstein, 31 wins (13 losses)

Most doubles wins: Erlich, 22 wins (12 losses)

Most ties played: Erlich, 34 ties

Most matches played: Glickstein, 66 matches (44 singles, 22 doubles)

Most years played: Erlich, 17 years

== See also ==
- Davis Cup
- Israel Billie Jean King Cup team
- Israel at the Hopman Cup
- Canada Stadium (Israel)
