= 2012 Davis Cup Europe/Africa Zone Group I =

International tennis competition

The Europe and Africa Zone is one of the three zones of regional Davis Cup competition in 2012.

In the Europe and Africa Zone there are four different groups in which teams compete against each other to advance to the next group.

== Draw ==
Seeds:

1. Israel
2. South Africa
3. Belgium
4. Romania

Remaining Nations:

- Denmark
- Finland
- Great Britain
- Netherlands
- Portugal
- Slovakia
- Slovenia

=== Draw ===
Second Round Play-offs
Slovak Republic
Portugal	1
Slovakia	3
Finland
Finland	1
Denmark	4

First Round Play-offs
bye
Portugal
bye
Slovakia
Cluj-Napoca, Romania (indoor)
Finland	2
4	Romania	3
Denmark
bye

First Round
1	Israel
bye
Portugal
bye
3	Belgium
bye
Great Britain
Great Britain	3
Slovakia	2
Netherlands
Finland	0
Netherlands	5
bye
4	Romania
Slovenia
Denmark	0
Slovenia	5
bye
2	South Africa

Second Round
Israel
1	Israel	3
Portugal	2
Great Britain
3	Belgium	4
Great Britain	1
Netherlands
Netherlands	5
4	Romania	0
South Africa
Slovenia	1
2	South Africa	4

- Portugal and Finland relegated to Group II in 2013.
- Israel, Belgium, Netherlands, and South Africa advance to World Group play-off.

== First round ==
=== Great Britain vs. Slovakia ===
Great Britain
3
Braehead Arena, Glasgow, Great Britain
10–12 February 2012
Hard (indoor)

Slovakia
2

			1	2	3	4	5
1	(United Kingdom) (Slovakia)	Daniel Evans; Lukáš Lacko	6; 3	7; 5	7; 5
2	(United Kingdom) (Slovakia)	James Ward; Martin Kližan	2; 6	6; 4	4; 6	6^{4} 7^{7}
3	(United Kingdom) (Slovakia)	Colin Fleming / Ross Hutchins; Michal Mertiňák / Filip Polášek	6; 3	7^{7} 6^{4}	0; 6	6; 3
4	(United Kingdom) (Slovakia)	James Ward; Lukáš Lacko	6^{9} 7^{11}	1; 6	3; 6
5	(United Kingdom) (Slovakia)	Daniel Evans; Martin Kližan	6; 1	6; 1	4; 6	3; 6	6; 3

=== Finland vs. Netherlands ===
Finland
0
Maaspoort Sports end Events, 's-Hertogenbosch, Netherlands
10–12 February 2012
Hard (indoor)

Netherlands
5

			1	2	3	4	5
1	(Finland) (Netherlands)	Juho Paukku; Robin Haase	1; 6	1; 6	1; 6
2	(Finland) (Netherlands)	Timo Nieminen; Thiemo de Bakker	1; 6	5; 7	3; 6
3	(Finland) (Netherlands)	Harri Heliövaara / Jarkko Nieminen; Robin Haase / Jean-Julien Rojer	2; 6	6^{4} 7^{7}	2; 6
4	(Finland) (Netherlands)	Harri Heliövaara; Jesse Huta Galung	2; 6	4; 6
5	(Finland) (Netherlands)	Juho Paukku; Thiemo de Bakker	6; 3	3; 6	2; 6

=== Denmark vs. Slovenia ===
Denmark
0
Rdeca Dvorana SRZ, Velenje, Slovenia
10–12 February 2012
Hard (indoor)

Slovenia
5

			1	2	3	4	5
1	(Denmark) (Slovenia)	Kristian Pless; Grega Žemlja	0; 6	1; 6	4; 6
2	(Denmark) (Slovenia)	Frederik Nielsen; Blaž Kavčič	2; 6	4; 6	4; 6
3	(Denmark) (Slovenia)	Thomas Kromann / Frederik Nielsen; Blaž Kavčič / Grega Žemlja	4; 6	7^{7} 6^{5}	4; 6	5; 7
4	(Denmark) (Slovenia)	Thomas Kromann; Aljaž Bedene	3; 6	6; 3	4; 6
5	(Denmark) (Slovenia)	Kristian Pless; Janez Semrajc	6^{5} 7^{7}	3; 6

== Second round ==
=== Israel vs. Portugal ===
Israel
3
Canada Stadium, Ramat HaSharon, Israel
6–8 April 2012
Hard

Portugal
2

			1	2	3	4	5
1	(Israel) (Portugal)	Dudi Sela; Frederico Gil	6; 3	6; 4	6; 4
2	(Israel) (Portugal)	Amir Weintraub; Rui Machado	5; 7	6; 3	6; 1	7; 5
3	(Israel) (Portugal)	Jonathan Erlich / Andy Ram; Gastão Elias / João Sousa	6; 4	6; 4	6; 3
4	(Israel) (Portugal)	Andy Ram; João Sousa	5; 7	0; 6
5	(Israel) (Portugal)	Amir Weintraub; Frederico Gil	6; 3	3; 6	6^{3} 7^{7}

=== Belgium vs. Great Britain ===
Great Britain
1
Braehead Arena, Glasgow, Great Britain
6–8 April 2012
Hard (indoor)

Belgium
4

			1	2	3	4	5
1	(United Kingdom) (Belgium)	Joshua Goodall; Steve Darcis	7^{7} 6^{2}	3; 6	4; 6	4; 6
2	(United Kingdom) (Belgium)	Dan Evans; Olivier Rochus	6; 3	4; 6	6^{7} 7^{9}	4; 6
3	(United Kingdom) (Belgium)	Colin Fleming / Ross Hutchins; Ruben Bemelmans / David Goffin	4; 6	7; 5	6; 3	6; 4
4	(United Kingdom) (Belgium)	Joshua Goodall; David Goffin	4; 6	4; 6	4; 6
5	(United Kingdom) (Belgium)	Dan Evans; Ruben Bemelmans	4; 6	4; 6

=== Netherlands vs. Romania ===
Netherlands
5
Sporthallen Zuid, Amsterdam, Netherlands
6–8 April 2012
Hard (indoor)

Romania
0

			1	2	3	4	5
1	(Netherlands) (Romania)	Thomas Schoorel; Petru-Alexandru Luncanu	6; 1	6; 3	6; 3
2	(Netherlands) (Romania)	Robin Haase; Andrei Dăescu	6; 3	6; 3	6; 4
3	(Netherlands) (Romania)	Jean-Julien Rojer / Igor Sijsling; Andrei Dăescu / Florin Mergea	6; 3	7^{7} 6^{3}	6^{3} 7^{7}	3; 6	9; 7
4	(Netherlands) (Romania)	Robin Haase; Petru-Alexandru Luncanu	7; 5	6; 2
5	(Netherlands) (Romania)	Thomas Schoorel; Darius Florin Brăguși	6; 2	6; 2

=== Slovenia vs. South Africa ===
South Africa
4
Arthur Ashe Tennis Centre, Johannesburg, South Africa
6–8 April 2012
Hard

Slovenia
1

			1	2	3	4	5
1	(South Africa) (Slovenia)	Ruan Roelofse; Blaž Kavčič	7^{7} 6^{4}	1; 6	1; 6	3; 6
2	(South Africa) (Slovenia)	Izak van der Merwe; Grega Žemlja	6; 1	3; 6	6; 3	6; 4
3	(South Africa) (Slovenia)	Raven Klaasen / Izak van der Merwe; Blaž Kavčič / Grega Žemlja	6^{5} 7^{7}	7^{7} 6^{4}	6; 1	6; 4
4	(South Africa) (Slovenia)	Izak van der Merwe; Blaž Kavčič	7^{7} 6^{4}	6; 4	6; 4
5	(South Africa) (Slovenia)	Ruan Roelofse; Nik Razboršek	4; 6	6; 3	7^{7} 6^{2}

== First-round play-off ==
=== Romania vs. Finland ===
Romania
3
Sala Sporturilor Horia Demian, Cluj-Napoca, Romania
14–16 September 2012
Hard (indoor)

Finland
2

			1	2	3	4	5
1	(Romania) (Finland)	Victor Crivoi; Jarkko Nieminen	5; 7	1; 6	2; 6
2	(Romania) (Finland)	Marius Copil; Harri Heliövaara	3; 6	6; 4	6; 2	6; 4
3	(Romania) (Finland)	Florin Mergea / Horia Tecău; Jarkko Nieminen / Harri Heliövaara	6; 4	7^{7} 6^{4}	6; 1
4	(Romania) (Finland)	Marius Copil; Jarkko Nieminen	3; 6	5; 7	6; 1	6^{4} 7^{7}
5	(Romania) (Finland)	Victor Crivoi; Harri Heliövaara	4; 6	7^{7} 6^{5}	6^{2} 7^{7}	6; 3	7; 5

== Second-round play-off ==
=== Portugal vs. Slovak Republic ===
Slovakia
3
Aegon Arena, Bratislava, Slovakia
14–16 September 2012
Hard (indoor)

Portugal
1

			1	2	3	4	5
1	(Slovakia) (Portugal)	Martin Kližan; Gastão Elias	3; 6	6; 2	7^{7} 6^{4}	6; 2
2	(Slovakia) (Portugal)	Lukáš Lacko; João Sousa	4; 6	4; 6	3; 6
3	(Slovakia) (Portugal)	Michal Mertiňák / Filip Polášek; Gastão Elias / Pedro Sousa	7; 5	4; 6	7^{7} 6^{5}	6; 3
4	(Slovakia) (Portugal)	Martin Kližan; João Sousa	6; 2	7; 5	6^{9} 7^{11}	6; 1
5	(Slovakia) (Portugal)	Lukáš Lacko; Gastão Elias						not played

=== Finland vs. Denmark ===
Finland
1
Tali Tennis Center, Helsinki, Finland
19–21 October 2012
Hard (indoor)

Denmark
4

			1	2	3	4	5
1	(Finland) (Denmark)	Juho Paukku; Frederik Nielsen	4; 6	7^{12} 6^{10}	7^{7} 6^{4}	7^{7} 6^{5}
2	(Finland) (Denmark)	Timo Nieminen; Martin Pedersen	2; 6	3; 6	3; 6
3	(Finland) (Denmark)	Timo Nieminen / Juho Paukku; Thomas Kromann / Frederik Nielsen	4; 6	2; 6	4; 6
4	(Finland) (Denmark)	Timo Nieminen; Frederik Nielsen	3; 6	3; 6	6; 3	6; 2	1; 6
5	(Finland) (Denmark)	Herkko Pöllänen; Christoffer Konigsfeldt	3; 6	6^{7} 7^{9}
