= 2011 Davis Cup World Group play-offs =

The 2011 Davis Cup World Group play-offs were held from September 16 to 18. They were the main play-offs of 2011 Davis Cup. Winners of the playoffs advanced to the 2012 World Group, and losers were relegated to their respective Zonal Regions I.

== Teams ==
Bold indicates team has qualified for the 2012 Davis Cup World Group.

From World Group

- India
- **Russia**
- **Czech Republic**
- Romania
- Chile
- Belgium
- **Croatia**
- **Austria**

From Americas Group I

- Brazil
- **Canada**

From Asia/Oceania Group I

- Australia
- **Japan**

From Europe/Africa Group I

- Israel
- **Italy**
- South Africa
- **Switzerland**

== Results ==
**Seeded teams**

1. Czech Republic
2. Russia
3. Israel
4. Croatia
5. Chile
6. India
7. Austria
8. Switzerland

**Unseeded teams**

- Australia
- Belgium
- Brazil
- Canada
- Italy
- Japan
- Romania
- South Africa

Home team	Score	Visiting team	Location	Venue	Door	Surface
Romania	0–5	**Czech Republic**	Bucharest	Centrul National De Tenis	Outdoor	Clay
**Russia**	3–2	Brazil	Kazan	Kazan Tennis Academy	Indoor	Hard
Israel	2–3	**Canada**	Ramat HaSharon	Canada Stadium	Outdoor	Hard
South Africa	1–4	**Croatia**	Potchefstroom	Fanie du Toit Sports Complex	Outdoor	Hard
Chile	1–4	**Italy**	Santiago	Estadio Nacional	Outdoor	Hard
**Japan**	3–2	India	Tokyo	Ariake Coliseum	Outdoor	Hard
Belgium	1–4	**Austria**	Antwerp	Lotto Arena	Indoor	Hard
Australia	2–3	**Switzerland**	Sydney	Royal Sydney Golf Club	Outdoor	Grass

- Austria, Croatia, Czech Republic and Russia will remain in the World Group in 2012.
- Canada, Italy, Japan and Switzerland are promoted to the World Group in 2012.
- Australia, Brazil, Israel, and South Africa will remain in Zonal Group I in 2012.
- Belgium, Chile, India and Romania are relegated to Zonal Group I in 2012.

== Playoff results ==
=== Romania vs. Czech Republic ===
Romania
0
Centrul National De Tenis, Bucharest, Romania
16–18 September 2011
Clay

Czech Republic
5

			1	2	3	4	5
1	(Romania) (Czech Republic)	Adrian Ungur; **Radek Štěpánek**	3; **6**	2; **6**	0; **6**
2	(Romania) (Czech Republic)	Victor Crivoi; **Tomáš Berdych**	3; **6**	3; **6**	6^{4} **7^{7}**
3	(Romania) (Czech Republic)	Marius Copil / Horia Tecău; **Tomáš Berdych / Radek Štěpánek**	**6**; 3	3; **6**	0; **6**	2; **6**
4	(Romania) (Czech Republic)	Marius Copil; **Lukáš Rosol**	4; **6**	6^{2} **7^{7}**
5	(Romania) (Czech Republic)	Victor Crivoi; **Jan Hájek**	1; **6**	4; **6**

=== Russia vs. Brazil ===
Russia
3
Kazan Tennis Academy, Kazan, Russia
16–18 September 2011
Hard (i)

Brazil
2

			1	2	3	4	5
1	(Russia) (Brazil)	**Mikhail Youzhny**; Ricardo Mello	**6**; 0	**6**; 2	**6**; 1
2	(Russia) (Brazil)	Igor Andreev; **Thomaz Bellucci**	4; **6**	3; **6**	3; **6**
3	(Russia) (Brazil)	Igor Kunitsyn / Dmitry Tursunov; **Marcelo Melo / Bruno Soares**	4; **6**	5; **7**	2; **6**
4	(Russia) (Brazil)	**Mikhail Youzhny**; Thomaz Bellucci	2; **6**	**6**; 3	5; **7**	**6**; 4	**14**; 12
5	(Russia) (Brazil)	**Dmitry Tursunov**; Ricardo Mello	**6**; 1	**7^{7}** 6^{5}	2; **6**	**6**; 3

=== Israel vs. Canada ===
Israel
2
Canada Stadium, Ramat HaSharon, Israel
16–18 September 2011
Hard

Canada
3

			1	2	3	4	5
1	(Israel) (Canada)	Dudi Sela; **Vasek Pospisil**	6^{4} **7^{7}**	**7^{8}** 6^{6}	1; **6**	**7^{7}** 6^{2}	3; **6**
2	(Israel) (Canada)	**Amir Weintraub**; Milos Raonic	5; **7**	**7**; 5	**6**; 3	**6**; 1
3	(Israel) (Canada)	Jonathan Erlich / Andy Ram; **Daniel Nestor / Vasek Pospisil**	**6**; 4	3; **6**	4; **6**	4; **6**
4	(Israel) (Canada)	**Dudi Sela**; Peter Polansky	**6**; 3	**6**; 3	**6**; 3
5	(Israel) (Canada)	Amir Weintraub; **Vasek Pospisil**	2; **6**	6^{3} **7^{7}**	4; **6**

=== South Africa vs. Croatia ===
South Africa
1
Fanie Du Toit Sports Stadium, Potchefstroom, South Africa
16–18 September 2011
Hard

Croatia
4

			1	2	3	4	5
1	(South Africa) (Croatia)	**Kevin Anderson**; Ivan Dodig	**6**; 3	**6**; 4	3; **6**	**7^{7}** 6^{5}
2	(South Africa) (Croatia)	Izak van der Merwe; **Marin Čilić**	0; **6**	0; **6**				**retired**
3	(South Africa) (Croatia)	Raven Klaasen / Rik de Voest; **Ivan Dodig / Marin Čilić**	2; **6**	4; **6**	**6**; 3	1; **6**
4	(South Africa) (Croatia)	Rik de Voest; **Marin Čilić**	4; **6**	2; **6**	4; **6**
5	(South Africa) (Croatia)	Raven Klaasen; **Nikola Mektić**	6^{2} **7^{7}**	1; **6**

=== Chile vs. Italy ===
Chile
1
Estadio Nacional, Santiago, Chile
16–18 September 2011
Hard

Italy
4

			1	2	3	4	5
1	(Chile) (Italy)	Paul Capdeville; **Potito Starace**	3; **6**	3; **6**	**6**; 2	6^{5} **7^{7}**
2	(Chile) (Italy)	Fernando González; **Fabio Fognini**	2; **6**	**6**; 4	1; 2			**retired**
3	(Chile) (Italy)	Jorge Aguilar / Nicolás Massú; **Simone Bolelli / Fabio Fognini**	4; **6**	4; **6**	4; **6**
4	(Chile) (Italy)	**Paul Capdeville**; Simone Bolelli	**7^{7}** 6^{3}	**6**; 2
5	(Chile) (Italy)	Nicolás Massú; **Daniele Bracciali**	3; 4					**retired**

=== Japan vs. India ===
Japan
4
Ariake Coliseum, Tokyo, Japan
16–18 September 2011
Hard

India
1

			1	2	3	4	5
1	(Japan) (India)	**Yuichi Sugita**; Somdev Devvarman	**6**; 3	**6**; 4	**7**; 5
2	(Japan) (India)	**Kei Nishikori**; Rohan Bopanna	**6**; 3	**6**; 2	**6**; 2
3	(Japan) (India)	Tatsuma Ito / Yuichi Sugita; **Mahesh Bhupathi / Rohan Bopanna**	5; **7**	**6**; 3	3; **6**	6^{4} **7^{7}**
4	(Japan) (India)	**Kei Nishikori**; Vishnu Vardhan	**7**; 5	**6**; 3	**6**; 3
5	(Japan) (India)	Go Soeda; **Rohan Bopanna**	4; **5**

=== Belgium vs. Austria ===
Belgium
1
Lotto Arena, Antwerp, Belgium
16–18 September 2011
Hard (i)

Austria
4

			1	2	3	4	5
1	(Belgium) (Austria)	Xavier Malisse; **Andreas Haider-Maurer**	4; **6**	4; **6**	5; **7**
2	(Belgium) (Austria)	**Steve Darcis**; Jürgen Melzer	**7^{7}** 6^{3}	6^{4} **7^{7}**	**6**; 4	**6**; 3
3	(Belgium) (Austria)	Steve Darcis / Olivier Rochus; **Oliver Marach / Alexander Peya**	**6**; 4	3; **6**	4; **6**	4; **6**
4	(Belgium) (Austria)	Olivier Rochus; **Jürgen Melzer**	4; **6**	4; **6**	3; **6**
5	(Belgium) (Austria)	Ruben Bemelmans; **Alexander Peya**	4; **6**	3; **6**

=== Australia vs. Switzerland ===
Australia
2
Royal Sydney Golf Club, Sydney, Australia
16–19 September 2011
Grass

Switzerland
3

			1	2	3	4	5
1	(Australia) (Switzerland)	**Bernard Tomic**; Stanislas Wawrinka	4; **6**	**6**; 4	**6**; 3	**6**; 3
2	(Australia) (Switzerland)	Lleyton Hewitt; **Roger Federer**	**7**; 5	6^{5} **7^{7}**	2; **6**	3; **6**
3	(Australia) (Switzerland)	**Lleyton Hewitt / Chris Guccione**; Roger Federer / Stanislas Wawrinka	2; **6**	**6**; 4	**6**; 2	**7^{7}** 6^{5}
4	(Australia) (Switzerland)	Bernard Tomic; **Roger Federer**	2; **6**	5; **7**	**6**; 3	3; **6**
5	(Australia) (Switzerland)	Lleyton Hewitt; **Stanislas Wawrinka**	**6**; 4	4; **6**	**7^{9}** 6^{7}	4; **6**	3; **6**
