= 2010 Davis Cup World Group =

- Date: 5 March – 5 December
- Edition: 30th

Champions
- Serbia
- Davis Cup

The World Group was the highest level of Davis Cup competition in 2010. The first round losers went into the Davis Cup World Group play-offs while the winners progressed to the quarterfinals. The quarterfinalists were guaranteed a World Group spot for 2011.

== Participating teams ==
Argentina	Belgium	Chile	Croatia
Czech Republic	Ecuador	France	Germany
India	Israel	Russia	Serbia
Spain	Sweden	Switzerland	United States

== Draw ==
The draw for the 2010 World Group was held in Geneva on 23 September 2009.

First round 5–7 March
Logroño, Spain (indoor clay)
1	Spain	4
Switzerland	1
Toulon, France (indoor hard)
France	4
8	Germany	1
Moscow, Russia (indoor hard)
4	Russia	3
India	2
Stockholm, Sweden (indoor hard)
Sweden	2
5	Argentina	3
Varaždin, Croatia (indoor hard)
6	Croatia	5
Ecuador	0
Belgrade, Serbia (indoor clay)
Serbia	3
3	United States	2
Coquimbo, Chile (clay) 6–8 March
Chile	4
7	Israel	1
Bree, Belgium (indoor clay)
Belgium	1
2	Czech Republic	4

Quarterfinals; 9–11 July
Clermont-Ferrand, France (indoor hard)
1	Spain	0
France	5
Moscow, Russia (indoor hard)
4	Russia	2
5	Argentina	3
Split, Croatia (indoor hard)
6	Croatia	1
Serbia	4
Coquimbo, Chile (clay)
Chile	1
2	Czech Republic	4

Semifinals; 17–19 September
Lyon, France (indoor hard)
France	5
5	Argentina	0
Belgrade, Serbia (indoor hard)
Serbia	3
2	Czech Republic	2

Final; 3–5 December
Belgrade, Serbia (indoor hard)
France	2
Serbia	3

== First round ==
=== Spain vs. Switzerland ===
Spain
4
Plaza de Toros de La Ribera, Logroño, Spain
5–7 March 2010
Clay (i)

Switzerland
1

			1	2	3	4	5
1	(Spain) (Switzerland)	Nicolás Almagro; Stanislas Wawrinka	6; 3	4; 6	6; 3	5; 7	3; 6
2	(Spain) (Switzerland)	David Ferrer; Marco Chiudinelli	6; 2	7^{7} 6^{5}	6; 1
3	(Spain) (Switzerland)	Marcel Granollers / Tommy Robredo; Yves Allegro / Stanislas Wawrinka	7^{10} 6^{8}	6; 2	4; 6	6; 4
4	(Spain) (Switzerland)	David Ferrer; Stanislas Wawrinka	6; 2	6; 4	6; 0
5	(Spain) (Switzerland)	Nicolás Almagro; Marco Chiudinelli	6; 1	6; 3

=== France vs. Germany ===
France
4
Palais des Sports de Toulon, Toulon, France
5–7 March 2010
Hard (i)

Germany
1

			1	2	3	4	5
1	(France) (Germany)	Gaël Monfils; Philipp Kohlschreiber	6; 1	6; 4	7^{7} 6^{5}
2	(France) (Germany)	Jo-Wilfried Tsonga; Benjamin Becker	6; 3	6; 2	6^{2} 7^{7}	6; 3
3	(France) (Germany)	Julien Benneteau / Michaël Llodra; Christopher Kas / Philipp Kohlschreiber	6; 1	6; 4	1; 6	7; 5
4	(France) (Germany)	Jo-Wilfried Tsonga; Simon Greul	6; 4	2; 6	0; 1			retired
5	(France) (Germany)	Julien Benneteau; Benjamin Becker	6; 2	7; 5

=== Russia vs. India ===
Russia
3
Luzhniki Palace of Sports, Moscow, Russia
5–7 March 2010
Hard (i)

India
2

			1	2	3	4	5
1	(Russia) (India)	Igor Kunitsyn; Somdev Devvarman	6^{6} 7^{8}	7^{7} 6^{4}	6; 3	6; 4
2	(Russia) (India)	Mikhail Youzhny; Rohan Bopanna	6; 4	6; 2	6; 3
3	(Russia) (India)	Teymuraz Gabashvili / Igor Kunitsyn; Mahesh Bhupathi / Leander Paes	3; 6	2; 6	2; 6
4	(Russia) (India)	Mikhail Youzhny; Somdev Devvarman	6; 2	6; 1	6; 3
5	(Russia) (India)	Teymuraz Gabashvili; Rohan Bopanna	6^{5} 7^{7}	4; 6

=== Sweden vs. Argentina ===
Sweden
2
Kungliga Tennishallen, Stockholm, Sweden
5–7 March 2010
Hard (i)

Argentina
3

			1	2	3	4	5
1	(Sweden) (Argentina)	Robin Söderling; Eduardo Schwank	6; 1	7^{7} 6^{0}	7; 5
2	(Sweden) (Argentina)	Joachim Johansson; Leonardo Mayer	7; 5	3; 6	5; 7	4; 6
3	(Sweden) (Argentina)	Robert Lindstedt / Robin Söderling; David Nalbandian / Horacio Zeballos	2; 6	6^{4} 7^{7}	6^{5} 7^{7}
4	(Sweden) (Argentina)	Robin Söderling; Leonardo Mayer	7; 5	7^{7} 6^{5}	7; 5
5	(Sweden) (Argentina)	Andreas Vinciguerra; David Nalbandian	5; 7	3; 6	6; 4	4; 6

=== Croatia vs. Ecuador ===
Croatia
5
Varaždin Arena, Varaždin, Croatia
5–7 March 2010
Hard (i)

Ecuador
0

			1	2	3	4	5
1	(Croatia) (Ecuador)	Ivo Karlović; Nicolás Lapentti	6; 2	5; 7	6^{2} 7^{7}	6; 3	6; 4
2	(Croatia) (Ecuador)	Marin Čilić; Giovanni Lapentti	6; 4	6; 3	6; 3
3	(Croatia) (Ecuador)	Marin Čilić / Ivo Karlović; Giovanni Lapentti / Nicolás Lapentti	7^{7} 6^{3}	6; 3	7; 5
4	(Croatia) (Ecuador)	Antonio Veić; Júlio César Campozano	6; 4	7^{7} 6^{4}
5	(Croatia) (Ecuador)	Ivan Dodig; Iván Endara	6; 1	6; 3

=== Serbia vs. United States ===
Serbia
3
Belgrade Arena, Belgrade, Serbia
5–7 March 2010
Clay (i)

United States
2

			1	2	3	4	5
1	(Serbia) (United States)	Viktor Troicki; John Isner	7^{7} 6^{4}	6^{5} 7^{7}	7; 5	6; 4
2	(Serbia) (United States)	Novak Djokovic; Sam Querrey	6; 2	7^{7} 6^{4}	2; 6	6; 3
3	(Serbia) (United States)	Janko Tipsarević / Nenad Zimonjić; Bob Bryan / John Isner	6^{8} 7^{10}	7; 5	6^{8} 7^{10}	3; 6
4	(Serbia) (United States)	Novak Djokovic; John Isner	7; 5	3; 6	6; 3	6^{6} 7^{8}	6; 4
5	(Serbia) (United States)	Viktor Troicki; Sam Querrey	5; 7	2; 6

=== Chile vs. Israel ===
Competition was delayed one day due to the 27 February 2010 earthquake.

Chile
4
Enjoy Tennis Center, Coquimbo, Chile
6–8 March 2010
Clay

Israel
1

			1	2	3	4	5
1	(Chile) (Israel)	Nicolás Massú; Dudi Sela	4; 6	6; 2	6; 2	6; 4
2	(Chile) (Israel)	Fernando González; Harel Levy	2; 6	6; 3	6; 4	6; 4
3	(Chile) (Israel)	Jorge Aguilar / Paul Capdeville; Jonathan Erlich / Andy Ram	7^{7} 6^{5}	6^{9} 7^{11}	6; 2	1; 6	0; 6
4	(Chile) (Israel)	Fernando González; Dudi Sela	6; 4	6; 4	6; 3
5	(Chile) (Israel)	Jorge Aguilar; Harel Levy	7^{7} 6^{3}	6; 1

=== Belgium vs. Czech Republic ===
Belgium
1
Expodroom Bree, Bree, Belgium
5–7 March 2010
Clay (i)

Czech Republic
4

			1	2	3	4	5
1	(Belgium) (Czech Republic)	Olivier Rochus; Tomáš Berdych	3; 6	0; 6	4; 6
2	(Belgium) (Czech Republic)	Xavier Malisse; Radek Štěpánek	2; 6	4; 6	6^{3} 7^{7}
3	(Belgium) (Czech Republic)	Steve Darcis / Olivier Rochus; Tomáš Berdych / Radek Štěpánek	6^{0} 7^{7}	0; 6	3; 6
4	(Belgium) (Czech Republic)	Steve Darcis; Jan Hájek	7^{8} 6^{6}	1; 6	6; 4
5	(Belgium) (Czech Republic)	Christophe Rochus; Lukáš Dlouhý	6; 1	6^{3} 7^{7}	5; 7

== Quarterfinals ==
=== France vs. Spain ===
France
5
Grande Halle d'Auvergne, Clermont-Ferrand, France
9–11 July 2010
Hard (i)

Spain
0

			1	2	3	4	5
1	(France) (Spain)	Gaël Monfils; David Ferrer	7^{7} 6^{3}	6; 2	4; 6	5; 7	6; 4
2	(France) (Spain)	Michaël Llodra; Fernando Verdasco	6^{5} 7^{7}	6; 4	6; 3	7^{7} 6^{2}
3	(France) (Spain)	Julien Benneteau / Michaël Llodra; Feliciano López / Fernando Verdasco	6; 1	6; 2	6^{6} 7^{8}	7^{7} 6^{5}
4	(France) (Spain)	Gilles Simon; Nicolás Almagro	7^{7} 6^{4}	7^{9} 6^{7}
5	(France) (Spain)	Julien Benneteau; Feliciano López	7^{7} 6^{3}	6; 4

=== Russia vs. Argentina ===
Russia
2
Olympic Stadium, Moscow, Russia
9–11 July 2010
Hard (i)

Argentina
3

			1	2	3	4	5
1	(Russia) (Argentina)	Nikolay Davydenko; David Nalbandian	4; 6	6^{5} 7^{7}	6^{6} 7^{8}
2	(Russia) (Argentina)	Mikhail Youzhny; Leonardo Mayer	6; 3	6; 1	6; 4
3	(Russia) (Argentina)	Nikolay Davydenko / Igor Kunitsyn; Eduardo Schwank / Horacio Zeballos	6^{7} 7^{9}	4; 6	7^{7} 6^{3}	1; 6
4	(Russia) (Argentina)	Nikolay Davydenko; Eduardo Schwank	4; 6	6; 3	6; 1	6; 4
5	(Russia) (Argentina)	Mikhail Youzhny; David Nalbandian	6^{5} 7^{7}	4; 6	3; 6

=== Croatia vs. Serbia ===
Croatia
1
Spaladium Arena, Split, Croatia
9–11 July 2010
Hard (i)

Serbia
4

			1	2	3	4	5
1	(Croatia) (Serbia)	Ivan Ljubičić; Novak Djokovic	6^{3} 7^{7}	4; 6	1; 6
2	(Croatia) (Serbia)	Marin Čilić; Viktor Troicki	6; 4	7; 5	6; 2
3	(Croatia) (Serbia)	Marin Čilić / Ivan Dodig; Janko Tipsarević / Nenad Zimonjić	3; 6	2; 6	4; 6
4	(Croatia) (Serbia)	Marin Čilić; Novak Djokovic	3; 6	3; 6	2; 6
5	(Croatia) (Serbia)	Antonio Veić; Janko Tipsarević	2; 6	6^{5} 7^{7}

=== Chile vs. Czech Republic ===
Chile
1
Enjoy Tennis Center, Coquimbo, Chile
9–11 July 2010
Clay

Czech Republic
4

			1	2	3	4	5
1	(Chile) (Czech Republic)	Nicolás Massú; Ivo Minář	0; 6	2; 6	3; 6
2	(Chile) (Czech Republic)	Paul Capdeville; Jan Hájek	0; 6	2; 6	1; 6
3	(Chile) (Czech Republic)	Jorge Aguilar / Nicolás Massú; Lukáš Dlouhý / Jan Hájek	6^{3} 7^{7}	3; 6	6; 3	3; 6
4	(Chile) (Czech Republic)	Jorge Aguilar; Lukáš Dlouhý	6; 1	7^{8} 6^{6}
5	(Chile) (Czech Republic)	Cristóbal Saavedra-Corvalán; Ivo Minář	6^{2} 7^{7}	2; 6

== Semifinals ==
=== France vs. Argentina ===
France
5
Palais des Sports de Gerland, Lyon, France
17–19 September 2010
Hard (i)

Argentina
0

			1	2	3	4	5
1	(France) (Argentina)	Michaël Llodra; Juan Mónaco	7; 5	4; 6	7; 5	6; 3
2	(France) (Argentina)	Gaël Monfils; David Nalbandian	6; 4	2; 6	6; 4	6; 3
3	(France) (Argentina)	Arnaud Clément / Michaël Llodra; Eduardo Schwank / Horacio Zeballos	6; 4	7; 5	6; 3
4	(France) (Argentina)	Gilles Simon; Eduardo Schwank	7^{7} 6^{5}	6^{6} 7^{8}	6; 3
5	(France) (Argentina)	Arnaud Clément; Horacio Zeballos	7; 5	6; 1

=== Serbia vs. Czech Republic ===
Serbia
3
Belgrade Arena, Belgrade, Serbia
17–19 September 2010
Hard (i)

Czech Republic
2

			1	2	3	4	5
1	(Serbia) (Czech Republic)	Viktor Troicki; Radek Štěpánek	6; 4	2; 6	4; 6	4; 6
2	(Serbia) (Czech Republic)	Janko Tipsarević; Tomáš Berdych	7; 5	6; 2	2; 6	7^{7} 6^{5}
3	(Serbia) (Czech Republic)	Novak Djokovic / Nenad Zimonjić; Tomáš Berdych / Radek Štěpánek	6; 3	1; 6	4; 6	1; 6
4	(Serbia) (Czech Republic)	Novak Djokovic; Tomáš Berdych	4; 6	6; 3	6; 2	6; 4
5	(Serbia) (Czech Republic)	Janko Tipsarević; Radek Štěpánek	6; 0	7^{8} 6^{6}	6; 4

== Final ==
=== Serbia vs. France ===
Serbia
3
Belgrade Arena, Belgrade, Serbia
3–5 December 2010
Hard (i)

France
2

			1	2	3	4	5
1	(Serbia) (France)	Janko Tipsarević; Gaël Monfils	1; 6	6^{4} 7^{7}	0; 6
2	(Serbia) (France)	Novak Djokovic; Gilles Simon	6; 3	6; 1	7; 5
3	(Serbia) (France)	Viktor Troicki / Nenad Zimonjić; Arnaud Clément / Michaël Llodra	6; 3	7^{7} 6^{3}	4; 6	5; 7	4; 6
4	(Serbia) (France)	Novak Djokovic; Gaël Monfils	6; 2	6; 2	6; 4
5	(Serbia) (France)	Viktor Troicki; Michaël Llodra	6; 2	6; 2	6; 3
