= Belgium Davis Cup team =

Davis Cup team representing Belgium

Belgium
- Captain: Johan Van Herck
- Nations Ranking: 4 (21 September 2026)
- Colors: Red & Black
- First year: 1904
- Years played: 103
- Ties played (W–L): 212 (108–104)
- Years in World Group: 27 (20–30)
- Runners-up: 3 (1904, 2015, 2017)
- Most total wins: Jacques Brichant (71–49)
- Most singles wins: Jacques Brichant (52–27)
- Most doubles wins: Philippe Washer (20–18)
- Best doubles team: Philippe Washer & Jacques Brichant (16–14)
- Most ties played: Jacques Brichant (42)
- Most years played: Jacques Brichant (17)

The Belgium men's national tennis team represents Belgium in Davis Cup tennis competition and are governed by the Royal Belgian Tennis Federation.

== History ==
Belgium competed in its first Davis Cup in 1904 when it achieved its best result until 2015, a final lost to the British Isles. They made the final again, in 2015, when they lost to Great Britain yet again. They reached the final again in 2017, losing again, this time against France.

== Current squad ==
Player information and rankings as of 18 September 2026

Squad representing Belgium in the 2026 Davis Cup
Player	ATP ranking	Years played	Total W–L	Singles W–L	Doubles W–L
Zizou Bergs	#38 (Singles)	-	-	-	-
Gauthier Onclin	#164 (Singles)	-	-	-	-
Kimmer Coppejans	#223 (Singles)	-	-	-	-
Sander Gillé	#55 (Doubles)	-	-	-	-
Joran Vliegen	#175 (Doubles)	-	-	-	--

== Results and fixtures ==
The following are lists of match results and scheduled matches for the current year and as well as previous Davis Cup results.

Win Loss Fixture

=== 2000s ===
Year	Competition	Date	Location	Opponent	Score	Result
2000	World Group, 1st round	4–6 February	Moscow (RUS)	Russia	1–4	Lost
2000	World Group play-offs	21–23 July	Venice (ITA)	Italy	4–1	Won
2001	World Group, 1st round	4–6 February	Ghent (BEL)	France	0–5	Lost
2001	World Group play-offs	21–23 September	Liège (BEL)	Morocco	2–3	Lost
2002	Euro/African Zone, Group I	5–7 April	Liège (BEL)	Greece	5–0	Won
2002	World Group play-offs	20–22 September	Harare (ZIM)	Zimbabwe	4–1	Won
2003	World Group, 1st round	7–9 February	Seville (ESP)	Spain	0–5	Lost
2003	World Group play-offs	19–21 September	Pörtschach (AUT)	Austria	2–3	Lost
2004	Euro/African Zone, Group I	9–11 April	Tournai (BEL)	Zimbabwe	4–1	Won
2004	World Group play-offs	24–26 September	Rijeka (CRO)	Croatia	2–3	Lost
2005	Euro/African Zone, Group I	29 April – 1 May	Belgrade (SCG)	Serbia and Montenegro	3–2	Won
2005	World Group play-offs	23–25 September	Leuven (BEL)	United States	1–4	Lost
2006	Euro/African Zone, Group I	7–9 April	Kyiv (UKR)	Ukraine	4–1	Won
2006	World Group play-offs	22–24 September	Bratislava (SVK)	Slovakia	3–2	Won
2007	World Group, 1st round	9–11 February	Liège (BEL)	Australia	3–2	Won
2007	World Group, Quarter-final	6–8 April	Ostend (BEL)	Germany	2–3	Lost
2008	World Group, 1st round	8–10 February	Ostrava (CZE)	Czech Republic	2–3	Lost
2008	World Group play-offs	19–21 September	Lausanne (SUI)	Switzerland	1–4	Lost
2009	Europe/Africa Zone, Group I	6–8 March	Liège (BEL)	Poland	4–1	Won
2009	World Group play-offs	18–20 September	Charleroi (BEL)	Ukraine	3–2	Won

=== 2010s ===
Year	Competition	Date	Location	Opponent	Score	Result
2010	World Group, 1st round	5–7 March	Bree (BEL)	Czech Republic	1–4	Lost
2010	World Group, Play-off	17–20 September	Cairns (AUS)	Australia	3–2	Won
2011	World Group, 1st round	4–6 March	Charleroi (BEL)	Spain	1–4	Lost
2011	World Group, Play-off	16–18 September	Antwerp (BEL)	Austria	1–4	Lost
2012	Euro/African Zone, Group I	6–8 April	Glasgow (GBR)	Great Britain	4–1	Won
2012	World Group, Play-off	16–18 September	Brussels (BEL)	Sweden	5–0	Won
2013	World Group, 1st round	1–3 February	Charleroi (BEL)	Serbia	2–3	Lost
2013	World Group, Play-off	16–18 September	Antwerp (BEL)	Israel	3–2	Won
2014	World Group, 1st round	31 January–2 Feb.	Astana (KAZ)	Kazakhstan	2–3	Lost
2014	World Group, Play-off	12–14 September	Tallinn (EST)	Ukraine	3–2	Won
2015	World Group, 1st round	6–8 March	Liège (BEL)	Switzerland	3–2	Won
2015	World Group, Quarter-final	17–19 July	Middelkerke (BEL)	Canada	5–0	Won
2015	World Group, Semi-final	18–20 September	Brussels (BEL)	Argentina	3–2	Won
2015	World Group, Final	27–29 November	Ghent (BEL)	Great Britain	1–3	Runner-up
2016	World Group, 1st round	4–6 March	Liège (BEL)	Croatia	2–3	Lost
2016	World Group, Play-off	15–17 September	Ostend (BEL)	Brazil	4–0	Won
2017	World Group, 1st Round	3–5 February	Frankfurt (GER)	Germany	4–1	Won
2017	World Group, Quarter-final	7–9 April	Charleroi (BEL)	Italy	3–2	Won
2017	World Group, Semi-final	15–17 September	Brussels (BEL)	Australia	3–2	Won
2017	World Group, Final	24–26 November	Villeneuve-d'Asq (FRA)	France	2–3	Runner-up
2018	World Group, 1st Round	2–4 February	Liège (BEL)	Hungary	3–2	Won
2018	World Group, Quarter-final	6–8 April	Nashville (USA)	United States	0–4	Lost
2019	Qualifying round	1–2 February	Uberlândia (BRA)	Brazil	3–1	Won
2019	Finals, Group stage	18 November	Madrid (ESP)	Colombia	2–1	Won
2019	Finals, Group stage	20 November	Madrid (ESP)	Australia	1–2	Lost

=== 2020s ===
Year	Competition	Date	Location	Opponent	Score	Result
2020–21	Qualifying round	6–7 March 2020	Debrecen (HUN)	Hungary	2–3	Lost
2020–21	World Group I	18–19 September 2021	Asunción (PAR)	Bolivia	3–2	Won
2022	Qualifying round	4–5 March	Espoo (FIN)	Finland	3–2	Won
2022	Finals, Group stage	13 September	Hamburg (GER)	Australia	0–3	Lost
2022	Finals, Group stage	16 September	Hamburg (GER)	Germany	1–2	Lost
2022	Finals, Group stage	17 September	Hamburg (GER)	France	1–2	Lost
2023	Qualifying round	4–5 February	Seoul (KOR)	South Korea	2–3	Lost
2023	World Group I	16–17 September	Hasselt (BEL)	Uzbekistan	3–1	Won
2024	Qualifying round	3–4 February	Varaždin (CRO)	Croatia	3–1	Won
2024	Finals, Group stage	10 September	Bologna (ITA)	Netherlands	2–1	Won
2024	Finals, Group stage	13 September	Bologna (ITA)	Italy	1–2	Lost
2024	Finals, Group stage	14 September	Bologna (ITA)	Brazil	1–2	Lost
2025	Qualifying round I	1-2 February	Hasselt (BEL)	Chile	3–1	Won
2025	Qualifying round II	13–14 September	Sydney (AUS)	Australia	3–2	Won
2025	Finals	18 November	Bologna (ITA)	France	2–0	Won
2025	Finals	21 November	Bologna (ITA)	Italy	0–2	Lost
2026	Qualifying round I	7-8 February	Plovdiv (BUL)	Bulgaria	4–0	Won
2026	Qualifying round II	18–19 September	Vienna (AUT)	Austria	1–3	Lost

== See also ==
- Davis Cup
- Belgium Billie Jean King Cup team
- Belgium at the Hopman Cup
- Royal Belgian Tennis Federation
