= Romania Davis Cup team =

Romanian national tennis team

Romania
- Captain: Gabriel Trifu
- Coach: Andrei Mlendea
- ITF ranking: 40 ▲2 (20 September 2021)
- Colors: Yellow & blue
- First year: 1922
- Years played: 70
- Ties played (W–L): 141 (73–68)
- Years in World Group: 14 (3–14)
- Runners-up: 3 (1969, 1971, 1972)
- Most total wins: Ilie Năstase (109–37)
- Most singles wins: Ilie Năstase (74–22)
- Most doubles wins: Ilie Năstase (35–15)
- Best doubles team: Ilie Năstase & Ion Țiriac (27–7)
- Most ties played: Ilie Năstase (52)
- Most years played: Ilie Năstase (18)

The Romania men's national tennis team represents Romania in Davis Cup tennis competition, being governed by the Romanian Tennis Federation and currently competes in the 2025 Davis Cup World Group II.

Romania has finished as runners-up three times. Alongside India, Romania has never won the Davis Cup despite playing three finals.

== Current squad ==
Rankings as of 31 December 2024

Squad representing Romania vs. Bulgaria 2025 Davis Cup World Group I play-offs
Player	ATP ranking
Gabi Adrian Boitan	No. 365
Marius Copil	No. 709
Victor Vlad Cornea	
Cezar Crețu	
Filip Cristian Jianu	

Recent callups

Player	Most recent appearance
Florin Mergea	2013 Europe/Africa Zone Group I, 1st round
Victor Crivoi	2012 Europe/Africa Zone Group I, 1st round Play-off
Nicolae Frunză	No. 627 (Singles)
Stefan Paloși	No. 643 (Singles)
Horia Tecău	No. 18 (Doubles)

== History ==
Romania finished runner-up three times – in 1969, 1971 and 1972 – and lost to USA in the Final on each occasion. The most contested match was in 1972, when Romania lost 3–2, Tiriac and Nastase winning for Romania. Only Romania and India have contested more than one Final without being crowned champion. Its first appearance in the competition was back in 1922.

== Recent performances ==
=== 2010s ===
Year	Competition	Date	Location	Opponent	Score	Result
2010	Europe/Africa Zone Group I, 1st Round	BYE				
2010	Europe/Africa Zone Group I, Quarterfinals	7–9 May	Bucharest (ROU)	Ukraine	3–1	Win
2010	World Group play-off	17–19 Sep	Bucharest (ROU)	Ecuador	5–0	Win
2011	World Group, 1st Round	4–6 Mar	Buenos Aires (ARG)	Argentina	1–4	Loss
2011	World Group play-off	16–18 Sep	Bucharest (ROU)	Czech Republic	0–5	Loss
2012	Europe/Africa Zone Group I, 1st Round	BYE				
2012	Europe/Africa Zone Group I, 2nd Round	6–8 Apr	Amsterdam (NED)	Netherlands	0–5	Loss
2012	Europe/Africa Zone Group I, 1st round play-offs	14–16 Sep	Cluj-Napoca (ROU)	Finland	3–2	Win
2013	Europe/Africa Zone Group I, 1st Round	1–3 Feb	Cluj-Napoca (ROU)	Denmark	5–0	Win
2013	Europe/Africa Zone Group I, 2nd Round	5–7 Apr	Brașov (ROU)	Netherlands	0–5	Loss
2014	Europe/Africa Zone Group I, 1st Round	31 Ian – 2 Feb	Dnipropetrovsk (UKR)	Ukraine	1–3	Loss
2014	Europe/Africa Zone Group I, 1st round play-offs	12–14 Sep	Bucharest (ROU)	Sweden	3–1	Win
2015	Europe/Africa Zone Group I, 1st Round	6–8 March	Sibiu (ROU)	Israel	5–0	Win
2015	Europe/Africa Zone Group I, 2nd Round	17–19 July	Constanța (ROU)	Slovakia	2–3	Loss
2016	Europe/Africa Zone Group I, 1st Round	4–6 March	Arad (ROU)	Slovenia	4–1	Win
2016	Europe/Africa Zone Group I, 2nd Round	15–17 July	Cluj-Napoca (ROU)	Spain	1–4	Loss
2017	Europe/Africa Zone Group I, 1st Round	3–5 February	Minsk (BLR)	Belarus	2–3	Loss
2017	Europe/Africa Zone Group I, 1st round play-offs	15–17 September	Wels (AUT)	Austria	1–4	Loss
2017	Europe/Africa Zone Group I, 2nd Round play-offs	27–29 October	Ramat HaSharon (ISR)	Israel	0–5	Loss
2018	Europe/Africa Zone Group II, 1st Round	3–4 February	Piatra Neamț (ROU)	Luxembourg	4–1	Win
2018	Europe/Africa Zone Group II, 2nd Round	7–8 April	Cluj-Napoca (ROU)	Morocco	5–0	Win
2018	Sports Festival -Friendly, Exhibition Round	15 June	Cluj-Napoca (ROU)	Team World- All legends (Goran Ivanišević, Mike Brian)	2–0	Win
2018	Europe/Africa Zone Group II, 3rd Round	15–16 September	Cluj-Napoca (ROU)	Poland	2–3	Loss
2019	Europe/Africa Zone Group II, 1st Round	5–6 April	Piatra Neamț (ROU)	Zimbabwe	4–1	Win

== See also ==
- Davis Cup
- Romania Billie Jean King Cup team
- Romania at the Hopman Cup
- Romanian Tennis Federation
