= 2010 Davis Cup World Group play-offs =

The World Group play-offs were the main play-offs of 2010 Davis Cup. Winners advanced to the World Group, and loser were relegated in the Zonal Regions I.

== Teams ==
Bold indicates team has qualified for the 2012 Davis Cup World Group.

From World Group

- Switzerland
- **Germany**
- **India**
- **Sweden**
- Ecuador
- **United States**
- Israel
- **Belgium**

From Americas Group I

- Brazil
- Colombia

From Asia/Oceania Group I

- Australia
- **Kazakhstan**

From Europe/Africa Group I

- **Austria**
- Italy
- South Africa
- **Romania**

== Results ==
**Seeded teams**

1. United States
2. Israel
3. Germany
4. Sweden
5. India
6. Australia
7. Switzerland
8. Ecuador

**Unseeded teams**

- Austria
- Belgium
- Brazil
- Colombia
- Italy
- Kazakhstan
- Romania
- South Africa

Home team	Score	Visiting team	Location	Venue	Door	Surface
Colombia	1–3	**United States**	Bogotá	Plaza de Toros la Santamaria	Outdoor	Clay
Israel	2–3	Austria	Tel Aviv	Nokia Arena	Indoor	Hard
**Germany**	5–0	South Africa	Stuttgart	TC Weissenhof	Outdoor	Clay
**Sweden**	3–2	Italy	Lidköping	Sparbanken Lidköping Arena	Indoor	Hard
**India**	3–2	Brazil	Santiago	Estadio Nacional	Outdoor	Hard
Australia	2–3	**Belgium**	North Cairns	Cairns Regional Tennis Centre	Outdoor	Hard
**Kazakhstan**	5–0	Switzerland	Astana	National Tennis Centre	Indoor	Hard
**Romania**	5–0	Ecuador	Bucharest	Centrul Naţional de Tenis	Outdoor	Clay

- Belgium, Germany, India, Sweden and United States will remain in the World Group in 2011.
- Austria, Kazakhstan and Romania are promoted to the World Group in 2011.
- Australia, Brazil, Colombia, Italy and South Africa will remain in Zonal Group I in 2011.
- Ecuador, Israel and Switzerland are relegated to Zonal Group I in 2011.

== Playoff results ==
=== Colombia vs. United States ===
Colombia
1
Plaza de Toros la Santamaria, Bogotá, Colombia
17–19 September 2010
Clay

United States
3

			1	2	3	4	5
1	(Colombia) (United States)	Alejandro Falla; **Mardy Fish**	**6**; 4	1; **6**	4; **6**	**6**; 3	4; **6**
2	(Colombia) (United States)	**Santiago Giraldo**; Sam Querrey	**6**; 2	**6**; 4	**7**; 5
3	(Colombia) (United States)	Robert Farah / Carlos Salamanca; **Mardy Fish / John Isner**	4; **6**	4; **6**	**7^{7}** 6^{5}	3; **6**
4	(Colombia) (United States)	Santiago Giraldo; **Mardy Fish**	**6**; 3	3; **6**	5; **7**	**6**; 4	6; **8**
5	(Colombia) (United States)	Carlos Salamanca; Ryan Harrison						**not** **played**

=== Israel vs. Austria ===
Israel
2
Nokia Arena, Tel Aviv, Israel
16–19 September 2010
Hard (i)

Austria
3

			1	2	3	4	5
1	(Israel) (Austria)	**Dudi Sela**; Andreas Haider-Maurer	**6**; 4	**6**; 1	**6**; 3
2	(Israel) (Austria)	Harel Levy; **Jürgen Melzer**	4; **6**	3; **6**	3; **6**
3	(Israel) (Austria)	**Jonathan Erlich / Andy Ram**; Jürgen Melzer / Alexander Peya	**7^{7}** 6^{2}	**6**; 4	**6**; 4
4	(Israel) (Austria)	Dudi Sela; **Jürgen Melzer**	4; **6**	0; **6**	3; **6**
5	(Israel) (Austria)	Harel Levy; **Martin Fischer**	**6**; 2	3; **6**	0; **6**	3; **6**

=== Germany vs. South Africa ===
Germany
5
TC Weissenhof, Stuttgart, Germany
17–19 September 2010
Clay

South Africa
0

			1	2	3	4	5
1	(Germany) (South Africa)	**Philipp Kohlschreiber**; Rik de Voest	**6**; 4	**6**; 4	**6**; 4
2	(Germany) (South Africa)	**Florian Mayer**; Izak van der Merwe	**6**; 3	3; **6**	**6**; 1	**7^{8}** 6^{6}
3	(Germany) (South Africa)	**Andreas Beck / Christopher Kas**; Rik de Voest / Wesley Moodie	**6**; 4	3; **6**	**6**; 3	**6**; 4
4	(Germany) (South Africa)	**Andreas Beck**; Izak van der Merwe	**7**; 5	**6**; 2
5	(Germany) (South Africa)	**Florian Mayer**; Rik de Voest	**6**; 3	6^{8} **7^{10}**	**6**; 2

=== Sweden vs. Italy ===
Sweden
3
Sparbanken Lidköping Arena, Lidköping, Sweden
17–19 September 2010
Hard (i)

Italy
2

			1	2	3	4	5
1	(Sweden) (Italy)	Andreas Vinciguerra; **Potito Starace**	2; **6**	2; **6**	2; **6**
2	(Sweden) (Italy)	**Robin Söderling**; Fabio Fognini	**6**; 1	**6**; 3	**6**; 2
3	(Sweden) (Italy)	**Simon Aspelin / Robert Lindstedt**; Simone Bolelli / Potito Starace	5; **7**	6^{0} **7^{7}**	**7^{7}** 6^{4}	**6**; 3	**7**; 5
4	(Sweden) (Italy)	**Robin Söderling**; Simone Bolelli	**6**; 3	**6**; 3	**6**; 3
5	(Sweden) (Italy)	Andreas Vinciguerra; **Fabio Fognini**	1; **6**	3; **6**

=== India vs. Brazil ===
India
3
SDAT Tennis Stadium, Chennai, India
17–19 September 2010
Hard

Brazil
2

			1	2	3	4	5
1	(India) (Brazil)	Rohan Bopanna; **Thomaz Bellucci**	**7^{7}** 6^{2}	6^{7} **7^{9}**	5; **7**	**6**; 4	8; **10**
2	(India) (Brazil)	Somdev Devvarman; **Ricardo Mello**	**6**; 4	2; **6**	**7^{7}** 6^{3}	2; **6**	4; **6**
3	(India) (Brazil)	**Mahesh Bhupathi / Leander Paes**; Marcelo Melo / Bruno Soares	**6**; 4	**7^{7}** 6^{5}	**6**; 1
4	(India) (Brazil)	**Somdev Devvarman**; Thomaz Bellucci	**7^{7}** 6^{3}	4; 0				**retired**
5	(India) (Brazil)	**Rohan Bopanna**; Ricardo Mello	**6**; 3	**7^{7}** 6^{2}	**6**; 3

=== Australia vs. Belgium ===
Australia
2
Cairns Regional Tennis Centre, North Cairns, Australia
17–20 September 2010
Hard

Belgium
3

			1	2	3	4	5
1	(Australia) (Belgium)	**Lleyton Hewitt**; Ruben Bemelmans	**7^{7}** 6^{4}	**7**; 5	2; **6**	**6**; 4
2	(Australia) (Belgium)	Carsten Ball; **Olivier Rochus**	4; **6**	4; **6**	6^{5} **7^{7}**
3	(Australia) (Belgium)	**Paul Hanley / Lleyton Hewitt**; Ruben Bemelmans / Olivier Rochus	**6**; 1	**6**; 2	**6**; 4
4	(Australia) (Belgium)	Peter Luczak; **Olivier Rochus**	6^{8} **7^{10}**	4; **6**	**7^{7}** 6^{0}	6^{2} **7^{7}**
5	(Australia) (Belgium)	Carsten Ball; **Steve Darcis**	6^{4} **7^{7}**	3; **6**	4; **6**

Rain stopped play on the third day: only 51 minutes of play were held in rubber 4 in which Peter Luczak and Olivier Rochus won 4 games each in the first set. The remainder of Rubber 4 and Rubber 5 continued on 20 September 2010.

=== Kazakhstan vs. Switzerland ===
Kazakhstan
5
National Tennis Centre, Astana, Kazakhstan
17–19 September 2010
Hard (i)

Switzerland
0

			1	2	3	4	5
1	(Kazakhstan) (Switzerland)	**Andrey Golubev**; Marco Chiudinelli	**6**; 4	**6**; 4	**6**; 4
2	(Kazakhstan) (Switzerland)	**Mikhail Kukushkin**; Stanislas Wawrinka	3; **6**	**6**; 1	**6**; 4	1; **6**	**6**; 3
3	(Kazakhstan) (Switzerland)	**Andrey Golubev / Yuri Schukin**; Yves Allegro / Stanislas Wawrinka	**6**; 4	**6**; 3	**6**; 3
4	(Kazakhstan) (Switzerland)	**Andrey Golubev**; Michael Lammer	**6**; 3	**6**; 2
5	(Kazakhstan) (Switzerland)	**Mikhail Kukushkin**; Marco Chiudinelli	**6**; 2	**6**; 4

=== Romania vs. Ecuador ===
Romania
5
Centrul Naţional de Tenis, Bucharest, Romania
17–19 September 2010
Clay

Ecuador
0

			1	2	3	4	5
1	(Romania) (Ecuador)	**Victor Hănescu**; Iván Endara	**6**; 2	**6**; 2	**6**; 2
2	(Romania) (Ecuador)	**Adrian Ungur**; Giovanni Lapentti	6^{2} **7^{7}**	4; **6**	**6**; 3	**6**; 4	**6**; 1
3	(Romania) (Ecuador)	**Victor Hănescu / Horia Tecău**; Iván Endara / Giovanni Lapentti	**6**; 2	**6**; 2	**6**; 2
4	(Romania) (Ecuador)	**Victor Crivoi**; Giovanni Lapentti	**6**; 2	**6**; 4
5	(Romania) (Ecuador)	**Adrian Ungur**; Emilio Gómez	**6**; 3	**6**; 4
