= Canada Stadium =

Tennis venue in Tel Aviv, Israel

Coordinates: 32.130232°N 34.840243°E

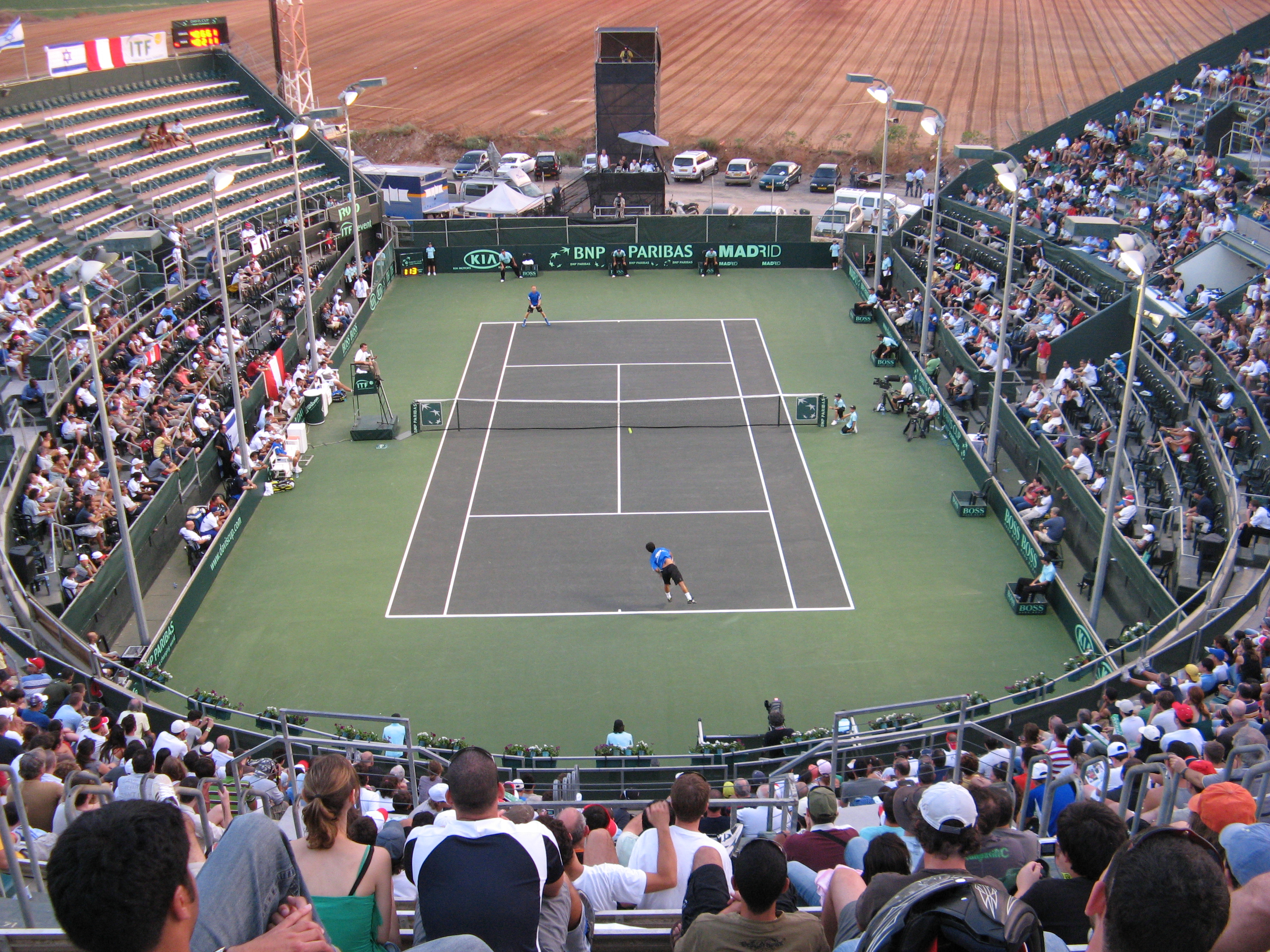
- The main court in 2008
- Interactive map of Canada Stadium
- Location: Ramat HaSharon, Tel Aviv District, Israel
- Capacity: 4,500 (tennis)
- Surface: Hard, Outdoors

Construction
- Opened: 1977

Tenant
- Tel Aviv Open (ATP 250) (1978–1996)

The Canada Stadium (Hebrew: אצטדיון קנדה) is a tennis stadium in the Tel Aviv District city of Ramat HaSharon, Israel. It is the country's main tennis venue, and is used mainly by the Israeli Davis Cup and Fed Cup teams.

== History ==
Canada Stadium, seating 4,500 spectators, opened in 1977 on land in Ramat Hasharon that had been an old strawberry patch, which was given to the Israel Tennis Centers (ITC) by the government. It was part of an ITC project that included the opening of 13 other tennis centres in the country. After the opening, floodlights were added to the court, so that play could continue into the night.

The stadium is the "main court" of the tennis centre at Ramat Hasharon, which is the biggest in the country. A large number of up-and-coming Israeli tennis professionals regularly train at the centre, as well as some top-quality players.

In Ramat Hasharon, Israel's first tennis stadium was built with money raised by Canadians Joe Frieberg, Ralph Halbert, Harold Green, and others, and named Canada Stadium in their honour. Canada Stadium was inaugurated as part of the first Israel Tennis Center in 1979.

== Future extension ==
On December 20, 2007, it was announced that the capacity of the stadium would increase to around 9,000, by 2012. It is estimated that the total cost of the project will be around $4 million. Also, a roof will be installed over the court, so that play will be able to continue in the event of rain. As of April 2022, these plans have not yet materialised.
