= Ukraine Davis Cup team =

National tennis team

Ukraine
- Captain: Orest Tereshchuk
- Nations Ranking: 40 ▼5(3 February 2025)
- Colors: Yellow & Blue
- First year: 1993
- Years played: 32
- Ties played (W–L): 74 (43–31)
- Years in World Group: 5 (3—3)
- Best finish: WG Play-offs (2009, 2013, 2014, 2016)
- Most total wins: Serhiy Stakhovsky (48–31)
- Most singles wins: Serhiy Stakhovsky (32–19)
- Most doubles wins: Andrei Medvedev (11–6); Serhiy Stakhovsky (11–9)
- Best doubles team: Andrei Medvedev & Dimitri Poliakov (7–2)
- Most ties played: Serhiy Stakhovsky (32)
- Most years played: Orest Tereshchuk; Serhiy Stakhovsky; Sergei Bubka

The Ukrainian men's national tennis team represents Ukraine in Davis Cup tennis competition and are governed by the Ukrainian Tennis Federation.

== History ==
Ukraine competed in its first Davis Cup in 1993. Ukraine currently compete in Group I of the Europe/Africa Zone . They have reached the World Group play-offs three times.

== Current squad (2025) ==
- Oleksii Krutykh
- Vladyslav Orlov
- Viacheslav Bielinskyi
- Oleksandr Ovcharenko

== See also ==
- Davis Cup
- Ukraine Billie Jean King Cup team
- Ukraine at the Hopman Cup
