= Levente Gödry =

Hungarian tennis player

- Country (sports): Hungary
- Residence: Budapest, Hungary
- Born: 17 April 1992 (age 33) Budapest, Hungary
- Height: 1.85 m (6 ft 1 in)
- Plays: Right-handed (two-handed backhand)
- Prize money: $24,557

Singles
- Career record: 0–0 (at ATP Tour level, Grand Slam level, and in Davis Cup)
- Career titles: 0; 0 Challenger, 0 Futures
- Highest ranking: No. 934 (25 August 2014)

Doubles
- Career record: 3–4 (at ATP Tour level, Grand Slam level, and in Davis Cup)
- Career titles: 0; 0 Challenger, 6 Futures
- Highest ranking: No. 512 (28 January 2019)

Team competitions
- Davis Cup: 5–4

Levente Gödry (born 17 April 1992) is a Hungarian tennis player.

Gödry has a career high ATP singles ranking of No. 934 achieved on 25 August 2014 and a career high ATP doubles ranking of No. 512 achieved on 28 January 2019. Gödry has won 6 ITF doubles titles.

Gödry has represented Hungary at Davis Cup, where he has a win–loss record of 5–4.

== Future and Challenger finals ==
=== Doubles 13 (6–7) ===
Legend
Challengers 0 (0–0)
Futures 13 (6–7)

Outcome	No.	Date	Tournament	Surface	Partner	Opponents	Score
Winner	1.	3 September 2010	Dobrich, Bulgaria F6	Clay	(Hungary) Ádám Kellner	(Romania) Robert Coman (Romania) Petru-Alexandru Luncanu	6–4, 6–2
Runner-up	2.	17 September 2011	Budapest, Hungary F1	Clay	(Hungary) Péter Nagy	(Chile) Hans Podlipnik-Castillo (Austria) Marc Rath	6–2, 4–6, [3–10]
Winner	3.	31 March 2012	Herzliya, Israel F6	Hard	(Hungary) Ádám Kellner	(France) Antoine Benneteau (France) Axel Michon	6–3, 6–3
Winner	4.	8 March 2013	Netanya, Israel F5	Hard	(Hungary) Viktor Filipenkó	(Greece) Alexandros Jakupovic (Czech Republic) Michal Schmid	6–4, 4–6, [10–5]
Winner	5.	27 July 2014	Valjevo, Serbia F6	Clay	(Hungary) Péter Nagy	(Montenegro) Ljubomir Čelebić (Italy) Davide Melchiorre	3–6, 6–4, [10–8]
Winner	6.	16 May 2015	Bol, Croatia F9	Clay	(Hungary) Gábor Borsos	(Canada) Martin Beran (Russia) Markos Kalovelonis	6–4, 7–5
Winner	7.	21 August 2016	Subotica, Serbia F5	Clay	(Hungary) Dávid Szintai	(Serbia) Goran Marković (Croatia) Antun Vidak	6–3, 6–4
Runner-up	8.	11 September 2016	Budapest, Hungary F4	Clay	(Hungary) Péter Nagy	(Hungary) Gábor Borsos (Hungary) Ádám Kellner	4–6, 6–1, [6–10]
Runner-up	9.	24 September 2016	Dunakeszi, Hungary F6	Clay	(Hungary) Péter Nagy	(Hungary) Attila Balázs (Hungary) Gergely Kisgyörgy	1–6, 3–6
Runner-up	10.	24 March 2017	Ramat HaSharon, Israel F2	Hard	(Hungary) Viktor Filipenkó	(Israel) Dekel Bar (Hungary) Gábor Borsos	4–6, 4–6
Runner-up	11.	26 May 2017	Balatonalmádi, Hungary F3	Clay	(Hungary) Péter Nagy	(Hungary) Gábor Borsos (Hungary) Viktor Filipenkó	3–6, 4–6
Runner-up	12.	18 June 2017	Gyula, Hungary F4	Clay	(Hungary) Péter Nagy	(Serbia) Nikola Čačić (Australia) Scott Puodziunas	6–7^{(2)}, 2–6
Runner-up	13.	31 August 2018	Székesfehérvár, Hungary F7	Clay	(Hungary) Péter Nagy	(Netherlands) Gijs Brouwer (Netherlands) Jelle Sels	7–6^{(4)}, 3–6, [5–10]

== Davis Cup ==
=== Participations: (5–4) ===
Group membership World Group (0–0) WG play-off (0–0) Group I (1–1) Group II (2–3) Group III (2–0) Group IV (0–0)	Matches by surface Hard (2–1) Clay (3–3) Grass (0–0) Carpet (0–0)	Matches by type Singles (0–0) Doubles (5–4)

- ▲ ▼ indicates the outcome of the Davis Cup match followed by the score, date, place of event, the zonal classification and its phase, and the court surface.

Rubber outcome	No.	Rubber	Match type (partner if any)	Opponent nation	Opponent player(s)	Score
▼2–3; 1–3 February 2013; Manejul de Atletică Ușoară, Chișinău, Moldova; Europe/Africa first round; hard (indoor) surface
Victory	1	III	Doubles (with Márton Fucsovics)	Moldova	Radu Albot / Andrei Ciumac	6–3, 6–2, 6–2
▼1–4; 5–7 April 2013; Budapesti Elektromos SE Sportcsarnok, Budapest, Hungary; Europe/Africa relegation play-off; hard (indoor) surface
Defeat	2	III	Doubles (with Márton Fucsovics)	Luxembourg	Gilles Müller / Mike Scheidweiler	6–4, 2–6, 3–6, 0–6
▲3–0; 7 May 2014; Gellért Szabadidőközpont, Szeged, Hungary; Europe/Africa round robin; clay surface
Victory	3	III	Doubles (with Márton Fucsovics)	Armenia	Ashot Gevorgyan / Sedrak Khachatryan	6–2, 6–0
▲3–0; 8 May 2014; Gellért Szabadidőközpont, Szeged, Hungary; Europe/Africa round robin; clay surface
Victory	4	III	Doubles (with Viktor Filipenkó)	Liechtenstein	Robin Forster / Christian Meier	6–0, 6–0
▲4–1; 6–8 March 2015; Városi Egyetemi Csarnok, Győr, Hungary; Europe/Africa first round; hard (indoor) surface
Victory	5	III	Doubles (with Márton Fucsovics)	Moldova	Radu Albot / Andrei Ciumac	7–6^{(7–4)}, 3–6, 4–6, 7–6^{(8–6)}, 8–6
▲3–2; 17–19 July 2015; Siófoki KC, Siófok, Hungary; Europe/Africa second round; clay surface
Defeat	6	III	Doubles (with Márton Fucsovics)	Bosnia and Herzegovina	Mirza Bašić / Amer Delić	6–3, 6–7^{(8–10)}, 4–6, 0–6
▲3–2; 18–20 September 2015; National Tennis Center, Sofia, Bulgaria; Europe/Africa promotional play-off; clay surface
Defeat	7	III	Doubles (with Márton Fucsovics)	Bulgaria	Tihomir Grozdanov / Alexandar Lazov	6–2, 6–7^{(3–7)}, 4–6, 6–4, 1–6
▲3–2; 4–6 March 2016; Hősök tere, Budapest, Hungary; Europe/Africa first round; clay surface
Victory	8	III	Doubles (with Márton Fucsovics)	Israel	Jonathan Erlich / Dudi Sela	7–6^{(7–2)}, 3–6, 7–6^{(7–5)}, 7–6^{(9–7)}
▼0–3; 15–17 July 2016; Europe Tennis Center, Budapest, Hungary; Europe/Africa second round; clay surface
Defeat	9	III	Doubles (with Márton Fucsovics)	Slovakia	Andrej Martin / Igor Zelenay	2–6, 2–6, 3–6
