= 2019 Davis Cup qualifying round =

The 2019 Davis Cup qualifying round was held on 1–2 February. The twelve winners of this round qualified for the 2019 Davis Cup Finals.

== Teams ==
Twenty-four teams played for twelve spots in the Finals, in series decided on a home and away basis.

These twenty-four teams were:

- 4 losing quarterfinalists of the previous edition,
- 8 winners of World Group play-offs of previous edition, and
- 12 best teams not previously qualified with best ranking of their zone:
  - 6 from Europe/Africa,
  - 3 from Asia/Oceania, and
  - 3 from Americas.

The 12 losing teams from the qualifying round will play at the Group I of the corresponding continental zone in September.

#: Ranking as of 29 October 2018.

Seeded teams

1. Belgium (2018 Quarterfinalist, #4)
2. Serbia (2018 Play-off winner, #8)
3. Australia (best ranked for replacing wild cards, #9)
4. Italy (2018 Quarterfinalist, #10)
5. Germany (2018 Quarterfinalist, #11)
6. Switzerland (2nd best ranked for replacing wild cards, #12)
7. Kazakhstan (2018 Quarterfinalist, #13)
8. Czech Republic (2018 Play-off winner, #14)
9. Sweden (2018 Play-off winner, #15)
10. Austria (2018 Play-off winner, #16)
11. Canada (2018 Play-off winner, #17)
12. Japan (2018 Play-off winner, #18)

Unseeded teams

- Hungary (Europe/Africa's best ranked, #21)
- Netherlands (Europe/Africa's 2nd best ranked, #22)
- Russia (Europe/Africa's 3rd best ranked, #23)
- Portugal (Europe/Africa's 4th best ranked, #26)
- Bosnia and Herzegovina (Europe/Africa's 5th best ranked, #27)
- Slovakia (Europe/Africa's 6th best ranked, #29)
- India (Asia/Oceania's best ranked, #20)
- Uzbekistan (Asia/Oceania's 2nd best ranked, #24)
- China (Asia/Oceania's 3rd best ranked, #30)
- Colombia (Americas' best ranked, #19)
- Chile (Americas' 2nd best ranked, #25)
- Brazil (Americas' 3rd best ranked, #28)

== Results summary ==
Home team	Score	Away team	Location	Venue	Surface
Brazil	1–3	Belgium [1]	Uberlândia	Ginásio Municipal Tancredo Neves	Clay (i)
Uzbekistan	2–3	Serbia [2]	Tashkent	Saxovat Sport Servis Sport Complex	Hard (i)
Australia [3]	4–0	Bosnia and Herzegovina	Adelaide	Memorial Drive Tennis Club	Hard
India	1–3	Italy [4]	Kolkata	Calcutta South Club	Grass
Germany [5]	5–0	Hungary	Frankfurt	Fraport Arena	Hard (i)
Switzerland [6]	1–3	Russia	Biel/Bienne	Swiss Tennis Arena	Hard (i)
Kazakhstan [7]	3–1	Portugal	Astana	Daulet National Tennis Centre	Hard (i)
Czech Republic [8]	1–3	Netherlands	Ostrava	Ostravar Aréna	Hard (i)
Colombia	4–0	Sweden [9]	Bogotá	Palacio de los Deportes	Clay (i)
Austria [10]	2–3	Chile	Salzburg	Salzburgarena	Clay (i)
Slovakia	2–3	Canada [11]	Bratislava	Aegon Arena	Clay (i)
China	2–3	Japan [12]	Guangzhou	Guangdong Olympic Tennis Centre	Hard

== Qualifying round results ==
=== Brazil vs. Belgium ===
Brazil
1
Ginásio Municipal Tancredo Neves, Uberlândia, Brazil
1–2 February 2019
Clay (i)

Belgium
3

			1	2	3
1	(Brazil) (Belgium)	Thiago Monteiro; Arthur De Greef	6; 3	6; 2
2	(Brazil) (Belgium)	Rogério Dutra Silva; Kimmer Coppejans	4; 6	4; 6
3	(Brazil) (Belgium)	Marcelo Melo / Bruno Soares; Sander Gillé / Joran Vliegen	4; 6	6^{4} 7^{7}
4	(Brazil) (Belgium)	Thiago Monteiro; Kimmer Coppejans	3; 6	4; 6
5	(Brazil) (Belgium)	Rogério Dutra Silva; Arthur De Greef				not played

=== Uzbekistan vs. Serbia ===
Uzbekistan
2
Saxovat Sport Servis Sport Complex, Tashkent, Uzbekistan
1–2 February 2019
Hard (i)

Serbia
3

			1	2	3
1	(Uzbekistan) (Serbia)	Sanjar Fayziev; Dušan Lajović	6^{4} 7^{7}	3; 6
2	(Uzbekistan) (Serbia)	Denis Istomin; Filip Krajinović	2; 6	4; 6
3	(Uzbekistan) (Serbia)	Sanjar Fayziev / Denis Istomin; Nikola Milojević / Viktor Troicki	2; 6	6; 1	6; 3
4	(Uzbekistan) (Serbia)	Denis Istomin; Dušan Lajović	6; 3	6; 4
5	(Uzbekistan) (Serbia)	Sanjar Fayziev; Filip Krajinović	6; 4	3; 6	0; 6

=== Australia vs. Bosnia and Herzegovina ===
Australia
4
Memorial Drive Tennis Club, Adelaide, Australia
1–2 February 2019
Hard

Bosnia and Herzegovina
0

			1	2	3
1	(Australia) (Bosnia and Herzegovina)	John Millman; Damir Džumhur	6; 3	6; 2
2	(Australia) (Bosnia and Herzegovina)	Alex de Minaur; Mirza Bašić	6; 3	7^{7} 6^{0}
3	(Australia) (Bosnia and Herzegovina)	John Peers / Jordan Thompson; Mirza Bašić / Tomislav Brkić	7; 5	6; 1
4	(Australia) (Bosnia and Herzegovina)	Alexei Popyrin; Nerman Fatić	6; 1	7^{7} 6^{2}
5	(Australia) (Bosnia and Herzegovina)	John Millman; Mirza Bašić				not played

=== India vs. Italy ===
India
1
Calcutta South Club, Kolkata, India
1–2 February 2019
Grass

Italy
3

			1	2	3
1	(India) (Italy)	Ramkumar Ramanathan; Andreas Seppi	4; 6	2; 6
2	(India) (Italy)	Prajnesh Gunneswaran; Matteo Berrettini	4; 6	3; 6
3	(India) (Italy)	Rohan Bopanna / Divij Sharan; Matteo Berrettini / Simone Bolelli	4; 6	6; 3	6; 4
4	(India) (Italy)	Prajnesh Gunneswaran; Andreas Seppi	1; 6	4; 6
5	(India) (Italy)	Ramkumar Ramanathan; Matteo Berrettini				not played

=== Germany vs. Hungary ===
Germany
5
Fraport Arena, Frankfurt, Germany
1–2 February 2019
Hard (i)

Hungary
0

			1	2	3
1	(Germany) (Hungary)	Philipp Kohlschreiber; Zsombor Piros	6^{6} 7^{8}	7; 5	6; 4
2	(Germany) (Hungary)	Alexander Zverev; Péter Nagy	6; 2	6; 2
3	(Germany) (Hungary)	Tim Pütz / Jan-Lennard Struff; Gábor Borsos / Péter Nagy	6; 2	6; 3
4	(Germany) (Hungary)	Alexander Zverev; Gábor Borsos	6; 3	6; 4
5	(Germany) (Hungary)	Philipp Kohlschreiber; Dávid Szintai	6^{5} 7^{7}	6; 3	10; 5

=== Switzerland vs. Russia ===
Switzerland
1
Swiss Tennis Arena, Biel/Bienne, Switzerland
1–2 February 2019
Hard (i)

Russia
3

			1	2	3
1	(Switzerland) (Russia)	Henri Laaksonen; Daniil Medvedev	6^{8} 7^{10}	7^{8} 6^{6}	2; 6
2	(Switzerland) (Russia)	Marc-Andrea Hüsler; Karen Khachanov	3; 6	5; 7
3	(Switzerland) (Russia)	Jérôme Kym / Henri Laaksonen; Evgeny Donskoy / Andrey Rublev	4; 6	6; 3	7^{7} 6^{1}
4	(Switzerland) (Russia)	Henri Laaksonen; Karen Khachanov	7^{7} 6^{2}	6^{6} 7^{8}	4; 6
5	(Switzerland) (Russia)	Marc-Andrea Hüsler; Daniil Medvedev				not played

=== Kazakhstan vs. Portugal ===
Kazakhstan
3
Daulet National Tennis Centre, Astana, Kazakhstan
1–2 February 2019
Hard (i)

Portugal
1

			1	2	3
1	(Kazakhstan) (Portugal)	Alexander Bublik; João Sousa	6^{1} 7^{7}	6; 4	6; 4
2	(Kazakhstan) (Portugal)	Mikhail Kukushkin; Pedro Sousa	6; 2	6; 0
3	(Kazakhstan) (Portugal)	Timur Khabibulin / Aleksandr Nedovyesov; Gastão Elias / João Sousa	6; 3	3; 6	4; 6
4	(Kazakhstan) (Portugal)	Mikhail Kukushkin; João Sousa	6; 4	6; 1
5	(Kazakhstan) (Portugal)	Alexander Bublik; Pedro Sousa				not played

=== Czech Republic vs. Netherlands ===
Czech Republic
1
Ostravar Aréna, Ostrava, Czech Republic
1–2 February 2019
Hard (i)

Netherlands
3

			1	2	3
1	(Czech Republic) (Netherlands)	Jiří Veselý; Tallon Griekspoor	5; 7	6; 4	6; 4
2	(Czech Republic) (Netherlands)	Lukáš Rosol; Robin Haase	2; 6	4; 6
3	(Czech Republic) (Netherlands)	Lukáš Rosol / Jiří Veselý; Robin Haase / Jean-Julien Rojer	6^{5} 7^{7}	6; 3	6^{7} 7^{9}
4	(Czech Republic) (Netherlands)	Jiří Lehečka; Robin Haase	4; 6	6; 2	3; 6
5	(Czech Republic) (Netherlands)	Lukáš Rosol; Tallon Griekspoor				not played

=== Colombia vs. Sweden ===
Colombia
4
Palacio de los Deportes, Bogotá, Colombia
1–2 February 2019
Clay (i)

Sweden
0

			1	2	3
1	(Colombia) (Sweden)	Santiago Giraldo; Elias Ymer	6; 2	6; 4
2	(Colombia) (Sweden)	Daniel Elahi Galán; Mikael Ymer	6; 1	6; 2
3	(Colombia) (Sweden)	Juan Sebastián Cabal / Robert Farah; Markus Eriksson / Robert Lindstedt	6; 3	6; 4
4	(Colombia) (Sweden)	Alejandro González; Elias Ymer	6; 3	6; 3
5	(Colombia) (Sweden)	Santiago Giraldo; Mikael Ymer				not played

=== Austria vs. Chile ===
Austria
2
Salzburgarena, Salzburg, Austria
1–2 February 2019
Clay (i)

Chile
3

			1	2	3
1	(Austria) (Chile)	Jurij Rodionov; Nicolás Jarry	5; 7	5; 7
2	(Austria) (Chile)	Dennis Novak; Christian Garín	6; 4	6; 4
3	(Austria) (Chile)	Oliver Marach / Jürgen Melzer; Marcelo Tomás Barrios Vera / Hans Podlipnik Castillo	6; 4	2; 6	7; 5
4	(Austria) (Chile)	Dennis Novak; Nicolás Jarry	4; 6	6; 3	6^{2} 7^{7}
5	(Austria) (Chile)	Jurij Rodionov; Christian Garín	2; 6	1; 6

=== Slovakia vs. Canada ===
Slovakia
2
Aegon Arena, Bratislava, Slovakia
1–2 February 2019
Clay (i)

Canada
3

			1	2	3
1	(Slovakia) (Canada)	Filip Horanský; Denis Shapovalov	4; 6	5; 7
2	(Slovakia) (Canada)	Martin Kližan; Félix Auger-Aliassime	7; 5	6; 3
3	(Slovakia) (Canada)	Martin Kližan / Filip Polášek; Félix Auger-Aliassime / Denis Shapovalov	3; 6	7; 5	6; 3
4	(Slovakia) (Canada)	Martin Kližan; Denis Shapovalov	6^{4} 7^{7}	4; 6
5	(Slovakia) (Canada)	Norbert Gombos; Félix Auger-Aliassime	3; 6	4; 6

=== China vs. Japan ===
China
2
Guangdong Olympic Tennis Centre, Guangzhou, China
1–2 February 2019
Hard

Japan
3

			1	2	3
1	(China) (Japan)	Li Zhe; Yoshihito Nishioka	6; 3	6; 2
2	(China) (Japan)	Zhang Ze; Taro Daniel	6^{3} 7^{7}	4; 6
3	(China) (Japan)	Gong Maoxin / Zhang Ze; Ben McLachlan / Yasutaka Uchiyama	5; 7	7; 5	6; 4
4	(China) (Japan)	Wu Yibing; Yoshihito Nishioka	2; 6	0; 6
5	(China) (Japan)	Li Zhe; Taro Daniel	3; 6	7^{7} 6^{4}	3; 6
