= 2013 Davis Cup Europe/Africa Zone Group II =

International tennis competition

The Europe and Africa Zone is one of the three zones of regional Davis Cup competition in 2013.

In the Europe and Africa Zone there are four different groups in which teams compete against each other to advance to the next group.

== Participating teams ==
Seeds:

1. Finland
2. Portugal
3. Latvia
4. Bosnia and Herzegovina
5. Belarus
6. Hungary
7. Estonia
8. Cyprus

Remaining nations:

- Benin
- Bulgaria
- Ireland
- Lithuania
- Luxembourg
- Moldova
- Monaco
- Tunisia

=== Draw ===
Play-offs
Plovdiv, Bulgaria (clay)
Bulgaria	3
7	Estonia	0
Tunis, Tunisia (clay)
Tunisia	2
5	Belarus	3
Budapest, Hungary (hard)
6	Hungary	1
Luxembourg	4
Nicosia, Cyprus (hard)
8	Cyprus	3
Benin	2

First round
Sofia, Bulgaria (indoor hard)
1	Finland	3
Bulgaria	2
Dublin, Ireland (indoor hard)
7	Estonia	2
Ireland	3
El Menzah, Tunisia (hard)
3	Latvia	3
Tunisia	0
Monte Carlo, Monaco (clay)
5	Belarus	1
Monaco	3
Chișinău, Moldova (indoor hard)
Moldova	3
6	Hungary	2
Sarajevo, Bosnia and Herz. (indoor hard)
Luxembourg	1
4	Bosnia and Herzegovina	4
Šiauliai, Lithuania (indoor hard)
Lithuania	4
8	Cyprus	1
Lisbon, Portugal (indoor clay)
Benin	0
2	Portugal	5

Second round
Dublin, Ireland (indoor hard)
1	Finland	3
Ireland	2
Monte Carlo, Monaco (clay)
3	Latvia	3
Monaco	2
Mostar, Bosnia-Herzegovina (clay)
Moldova	3
4	Bosnia and Herzegovina	1
Lisbon, Portugal (clay)
Lithuania	0
2	Portugal	5

Third round
Riga, Latvia (indoor hard)
1	Finland	2
3	Latvia	3
Chișinău, Moldova (indoor hard)
Moldova	2
2	Portugal	3

- Estonia, Tunisia, Hungary, and Benin relegated to Group III in 2014.
- Latvia and Portugal promoted to Group I in 2014.

== First round ==
=== Bulgaria vs. Finland ===
Bulgaria
2
Tennis Hall "Sofia", Sofia, Bulgaria
1–3 February 2013
hard (indoor)

Finland
3

			1	2	3	4	5
1	(Bulgaria) (Finland)	Grigor Dimitrov; Juho Paukku	6; 1	6; 1	6; 0
2	(Bulgaria) (Finland)	Alexandar Lazov; Micke Kontinen	6^{4} 7	3; 6	4; 6
3	(Bulgaria) (Finland)	Grigor Dimitrov / Dimitar Kuzmanov; Harri Heliövaara / Henri Kontinen	5; 7	1; 6	6; 4	6; 2	4; 6
4	(Bulgaria) (Finland)	Grigor Dimitrov; Micke Kontinen	6; 0	6; 3	6; 1
5	(Bulgaria) (Finland)	Alexandar Lazov; Harri Heliövaara	6; 4	6^{4} 7^{7}	4; 6	3; 6

=== Ireland vs. Estonia ===
Ireland
3
David Lloyd Riverview, Dublin, Ireland
1–3 February 2013
hard (indoor)

Estonia
2

			1	2	3	4	5
1	(Republic of Ireland) (Estonia)	James McGee; Jaan Kononov	6; 0	6; 1	6; 3
2	(Republic of Ireland) (Estonia)	Sam Barry; Vladimir Ivanov	6; 3	2; 6	3; 6	6^{3} 7^{7}
3	(Republic of Ireland) (Estonia)	Sam Barry / James McGee; Vladimir Ivanov / Marek Marksoo	6; 4	6; 3	3; 6	3; 6	9; 7
4	(Republic of Ireland) (Estonia)	James McGee; Vladimir Ivanov	4; 6	3; 6	6; 1	6; 4	1; 6
5	(Republic of Ireland) (Estonia)	Sam Barry; Marek Marksoo	6; 2	6; 1	6; 3

=== Tunisia vs. Latvia ===
Tunisia
0
Cité Nationale Sportive, Tunis, Tunisia
1–3 February 2013
hard (outdoor)

Latvia
3

			1	2	3	4	5
1	(Tunisia) (Latvia)	Mohamed Haythem Abid; Andis Juška	6^{7} 7^{9}	3; 6	0; 6
2	(Tunisia) (Latvia)	Slim Hamza; Ernests Gulbis	1; 6	2; 6	0; 6
3	(Tunisia) (Latvia)	Mohamed Haythem Abid / Slim Hamza; Ernests Gulbis / Andis Juška	6^{6} 7^{8}	6; 2	3; 6	4; 6
4	(Tunisia) (Latvia)	Mohamed Haythem Abid; Ernests Gulbis						not played
5	(Tunisia) (Latvia)	Slim Hamza; Andis Juška						not played

=== Monaco vs. Belarus ===
Monaco
3
Monte Carlo Country Club, Roquebrune-Cap-Martin, Monaco
1–3 February 2013
clay (outdoor)

Belarus
1

			1	2	3	4	5
1	(Monaco) (Belarus)	Benjamin Balleret; Dzmitry Zhyrmont	6^{6} 7^{8}	6; 1	6; 3	6; 3
2	(Monaco) (Belarus)	Jean-René Lisnard; Uladzimir Ignatik	4; 6	4; 6	0; 6
3	(Monaco) (Belarus)	Benjamin Balleret / Guillaume Couillard; Max Mirnyi / Andrei Vasilevski	7^{7} 6^{3}	4; 6	4; 6	7^{7} 6^{5}	6; 2
4	(Monaco) (Belarus)	Benjamin Balleret; Uladzimir Ignatik	6; 3	3; 6	7^{11} 6^{9}	6; 4
5	(Monaco) (Belarus)	Jean-René Lisnard; Dzmitry Zhyrmont						not played

=== Moldova vs. Hungary ===
Moldova
3
Manejul de Atletica Usoara, Chișinău, Moldova
1–3 February 2013
hard (indoor)

Hungary
2

			1	2	3	4	5
1	(Moldova) (Hungary)	Maxim Dubarenco; Márton Fucsovics	3; 6	6; 3	6; 4	6; 4
2	(Moldova) (Hungary)	Radu Albot; Viktor Filipenkó	6; 1	6; 3	6; 3
3	(Moldova) (Hungary)	Andrei Ciumac / Radu Albot; Márton Fucsovics / Levente Gödry	3; 6	2; 6	2; 6
4	(Moldova) (Hungary)	Radu Albot; Márton Fucsovics	6; 1	4; 6	1; 6	1; 6
5	(Moldova) (Hungary)	Maxim Dubarenco; Viktor Filipenkó	4; 6	6; 3	6; 4	7^{7} 6^{4}

=== Bosnia and Herzegovina vs. Luxembourg ===
Bosnia and Herzegovina
4
Mojmilo Sports Hall, Sarajevo, Bosnia and Herzegovina
1–3 February 2013
hard (indoor)

Luxembourg
1

			1	2	3	4	5
1	(Bosnia and Herzegovina) (Luxembourg)	Damir Džumhur; Mike Scheidweiler	6; 4	6; 4	6; 0
2	(Bosnia and Herzegovina) (Luxembourg)	Aldin Šetkić; Ugo Nastasi	6; 4	6; 0	6; 3
3	(Bosnia and Herzegovina) (Luxembourg)	Damir Džumhur / Tomislav Brkić; Mike Scheidweiler / Laurent Bram	6; 1	6; 3	6; 3
4	(Bosnia and Herzegovina) (Luxembourg)	Nerman Fatić; Ugo Nastasi	6; 4	4; 6	1; 6
5	(Bosnia and Herzegovina) (Luxembourg)	Aldin Šetkić; Laurent Bram	6; 3	6; 1

=== Lithuania vs. Cyprus ===
Lithuania
4
Šiauliai Arena, Šiauliai, Lithuania
1–3 February 2013
hard (indoor)

Cyprus
1

			1	2	3	4	5
1	(Lithuania) (Cyprus)	Dovydas Šakinis; Rareș Cuzdriorean	6; 2	6; 2	1; 6	6; 3
2	(Lithuania) (Cyprus)	Ričardas Berankis; Petros Chrysochos	6; 1	6; 4	6; 0
3	(Lithuania) (Cyprus)	Ričardas Berankis / Lukas Mugevičius; Petros Chrysochos / Rareș Cuzdriorean	5; 7	6; 3	6; 3	4; 6	4; 6
4	(Lithuania) (Cyprus)	Ričardas Berankis; Soteris Hadjistyllis	6; 3	6; 2	6; 1
5	(Lithuania) (Cyprus)	Lukas Mugevičius; Christos Hadjigeorgiu	6; 3	6; 3

=== Portugal vs. Benin ===
Portugal
5
Club Internacional de Football, Lisbon, Portugal
1–3 February 2013
clay (indoor)

Benin
0

			1	2	3	4	5
1	(Portugal) (Benin)	João Sousa; Loic Didavi	6; 1	6; 3	6; 0
2	(Portugal) (Benin)	Pedro Sousa; Alexis Klégou	4; 6	6; 1	6; 4	6; 2
3	(Portugal) (Benin)	João Sousa / Pedro Sousa; Loic Didavi / Alexis Klégou	6; 2	6; 1	6; 1
4	(Portugal) (Benin)	Rui Machado; Alexis Klégou	2; 6	6; 2	6; 0
5	(Portugal) (Benin)	André Gaspar Murta; Tunde Segodo	6; 1	6; 2

== Second round ==
=== Ireland vs. Finland ===
Ireland
2
Castleknock Tennis Club, Dublin, Ireland
5–7 April 2013
hard (indoor)

Finland
3

			1	2	3	4	5
1	(Republic of Ireland) (Finland)	James McGee; Harri Heliövaara	6; 4	4; 6	6^{1} 7^{7}	7^{7} 6^{4}	4; 6
2	(Republic of Ireland) (Finland)	Colin O'Brien; Jarkko Nieminen	1; 6	2; 6	0; 6
3	(Republic of Ireland) (Finland)	Sam Barry / Colin O'Brien; Henri Kontinen / Jarkko Nieminen	2; 6	1; 6	4; 6
4	(Republic of Ireland) (Finland)	Daniel Glancy; Micke Kontinen	6; 2	2; 6	6; 2
5	(Republic of Ireland) (Finland)	Colin O'Brien; Harri Heliövaara						w/o

=== Monaco vs. Latvia ===
Monaco
2
Monte Carlo Country Club, Roquebrune-Cap-Martin, Monaco
5–7 April 2013
clay (outdoor)

Latvia
3

			1	2	3	4	5
1	(Monaco) (Latvia)	Jean-René Lisnard; Ernests Gulbis	2; 6	3; 6	3; 6
2	(Monaco) (Latvia)	Benjamin Balleret; Andis Juška	3; 6	6; 2	6; 4	6; 3
3	(Monaco) (Latvia)	Benjamin Balleret / Guillaume Couillard; Ernests Gulbis / Andis Juška	6; 4	6; 4	6; 2
4	(Monaco) (Latvia)	Benjamin Balleret; Ernests Gulbis	2; 6	0; 6	1; 6
5	(Monaco) (Latvia)	Jean-René Lisnard; Andis Juška	6; 2	4; 6	1; 6	0; 3		retired

=== Bosnia and Herzegovina vs. Moldova ===
Bosnia and Herzegovina
1
Teniski Klub Mostar, Mostar, Bosnia and Herzegovina
5–7 April 2013
clay (outdoor)

Moldova
3

			1	2	3	4	5
1	(Bosnia and Herzegovina) (Moldova)	Tomislav Brkić; Radu Albot	3; 6	6^{3} 7^{7}	3; 6
2	(Bosnia and Herzegovina) (Moldova)	Damir Džumhur; Maxim Dubarenco	6; 3	2; 6	5; 7	6; 3	6; 4
3	(Bosnia and Herzegovina) (Moldova)	Damir Džumhur / Ismar Gorčić; Radu Albot / Andrei Ciumac	5; 7	4; 6	3; 6
4	(Bosnia and Herzegovina) (Moldova)	Damir Džumhur; Radu Albot	7^{7} 6^{4}	6; 4	4; 6	3; 6	3; 6
5	(Bosnia and Herzegovina) (Moldova)	Tomislav Brkić; Maxim Dubarenco						not played

=== Portugal vs. Lithuania ===
Portugal
5
Club Internacional de Football, Lisbon, Portugal
5–7 April 2013
clay (outdoor)

Lithuania
0

			1	2	3	4	5
1	(Portugal) (Lithuania)	Gastão Elias; Lukas Mugevičius	6; 0	6; 1	6; 2
2	(Portugal) (Lithuania)	Pedro Sousa; Dovydas Šakinis	6; 2	6; 4	6; 0
3	(Portugal) (Lithuania)	Gastão Elias / Rui Machado; Mantas Bugailiškis / Lukas Mugevičius	6; 3	6; 0	6; 2
4	(Portugal) (Lithuania)	Frederico Gil; Kasparas Žemaitėlis	6; 1	6; 3
5	(Portugal) (Lithuania)	Rui Machado; Lukas Mugevičius	6; 2	6; 0

== Play-offs ==
=== Bulgaria vs. Estonia ===
Bulgaria
3
TC Lokomotiv Plovdiv, Plovdiv, Bulgaria
5–7 April 2013
clay (outdoor)

Estonia
0

			1	2	3	4	5
1	(Bulgaria) (Estonia)	Tihomir Grozdanov; Vladimir Ivanov	6; 4	6; 1	6; 3
2	(Bulgaria) (Estonia)	Dimitar Kuzmanov; Markus Kerner	6; 2	6; 1	6; 2
3	(Bulgaria) (Estonia)	Tihomir Grozdanov / Alexandar Lazov; Mikk Irdoja / Vladimir Ivanov	4; 6	6^{4} 7^{7}	7^{7} 6^{2}	6; 4	6; 3
4	(Bulgaria) (Estonia)	Dimitar Kuzmanov; Vladimir Ivanov						not played
5	(Bulgaria) (Estonia)	Tihomir Grozdanov; Markus Kerner						not played

=== Tunisia vs. Belarus ===
Tunisia
2
Tennis Club de Tunis, Tunis, Tunisia
5–7 April 2013
clay (outdoor)

Belarus
3

			1	2	3	4	5
1	(Tunisia) (Belarus)	Mohamed Haythem Abid; Uladzimir Ignatik	3; 6	3; 6	5; 7
2	(Tunisia) (Belarus)	Malek Jaziri; Egor Gerasimov	7; 5	3; 6	6; 0	6; 3
3	(Tunisia) (Belarus)	Mohamed Haythem Abid / Malek Jaziri; Aliaksandr Bury / Max Mirnyi	3; 6	1; 6	5; 7
4	(Tunisia) (Belarus)	Malek Jaziri; Uladzimir Ignatik	6; 4	6; 1	6; 1
5	(Tunisia) (Belarus)	Mohamed Haythem Abid; Egor Gerasimov	7^{7} 6^{5}	4; 6	1; 6	7; 5	4; 6

=== Hungary vs. Luxembourg ===
Hungary
1
Budapesti Elektromos Sportegyesület Sportcsarnoka, Budapest, Hungary
5–7 April 2013
hard (indoor)

Luxembourg
4

			1	2	3	4	5
1	(Hungary) (Luxembourg)	Attila Balázs; Ugo Nastasi	6; 4	7^{7} 6^{3}	6; 1
2	(Hungary) (Luxembourg)	Márton Fucsovics; Gilles Müller	3; 6	4; 6	0; 6
3	(Hungary) (Luxembourg)	Márton Fucsovics / Levente Gödry; Gilles Müller / Mike Scheidweiler	6; 4	2; 6	3; 6	0; 6
4	(Hungary) (Luxembourg)	Attila Balázs; Gilles Müller	7^{7} 6^{1}	2; 6	3; 6	6; 4	7; 9
5	(Hungary) (Luxembourg)	Viktor Filipenko; Gilles Kremer	7^{9} 6^{7}	4; 6	6^{5} 7^{7}

=== Cyprus vs. Benin ===
Cyprus
3
National Tennis Centre, Nicosia, Cyprus
5–7 April 2013
hard (outdoor)

Benin
2

			1	2	3	4	5
1	(Cyprus) (Benin)	Marcos Baghdatis; Jean Segodo	6; 1	6; 1	6; 1
2	(Cyprus) (Benin)	Petros Chrysochos; Alexis Klégou	6; 4	1; 6	4; 6	2; 6
3	(Cyprus) (Benin)	Marcos Baghdatis / Rareș Cuzdriorean; Alexis Klégou / Magloire Yakpa	6; 2	7; 5	6; 1
4	(Cyprus) (Benin)	Rareș Cuzdriorean; Alexis Klégou	2; 6	6; 4	3; 6	2; 6
5	(Cyprus) (Benin)	Petros Chrysochos; Magloire Yakpa	6; 1	6; 1	6; 0

== Third round ==
=== Latvia vs. Finland ===
Latvia
3
Olympic Sport Centre, Riga, Latvia
13–15 September 2013
hard (indoor)

Finland
2

			1	2	3	4	5
1	(Latvia) (Finland)	Miķelis Lībietis; Micke Kontinen	4; 6	6; 4	3; 6	4; 6
2	(Latvia) (Finland)	Ernests Gulbis; Herkko Pöllänen	6; 2	6; 4	6; 1
3	(Latvia) (Finland)	Ernests Gulbis / Miķelis Lībietis; Henri Kontinen / Micke Kontinen	6; 2	7^{7} 6^{2}	6; 3
4	(Latvia) (Finland)	Ernests Gulbis; Juho Paukku	6; 2	6; 4	6; 4
5	(Latvia) (Finland)	Mārtiņš Podžus; Herkko Pöllänen	4; 6	4; 6

=== Moldova vs. Portugal ===
Moldova
2
Manejul de Atletica Usoara, Chișinău, Moldova
13–15 September 2013
hard (indoor)

Portugal
3

			1	2	3	4	5
1	(Moldova) (Portugal)	Radu Albot; Gastão Elias	6; 3	2; 6	6; 4	6; 4
2	(Moldova) (Portugal)	Maxim Dubarenco; João Sousa	7^{7} 6^{4}	6^{4} 7^{7}	1; 6	3; 6
3	(Moldova) (Portugal)	Roman Borvanov / Andrei Ciumac; Gastão Elias / João Sousa	3; 6	4; 6	3; 6
4	(Moldova) (Portugal)	Radu Albot; João Sousa	3; 6	3; 6	6; 3	6; 4	11; 9
5	(Moldova) (Portugal)	Maxim Dubarenco; Rui Machado	5; 7	1; 6	3; 6
