= Péter Nagy (tennis) =

Hungarian tennis player

- Country (sports): Hungary
- Residence: Budapest, Hungary
- Born: 17 March 1992 (age 33) Budapest, Hungary
- Height: 1.80 m (5 ft 11 in)
- Retired: 2022 (last match played)
- Plays: Right-handed (two handed-backhand)
- Prize money: $87,312

Singles
- Career record: 3–4 (at ATP Tour level, Grand Slam level, and in Davis Cup)
- Career titles: 0
- Highest ranking: No. 409 (15 May 2017)

Doubles
- Career record: 1–2 (at ATP Tour level, Grand Slam level, and in Davis Cup)
- Career titles: 0
- Highest ranking: No. 283 (10 December 2018)

Team competitions
- Davis Cup: 4–5
- Last updated on: 27 September 2021.

Péter Nagy (born 17 March 1992) is a Hungarian tennis coach and a former professional player. Nagy has a career high ATP singles ranking of world No. 409 achieved on 15 May 2017. He also has a career high doubles ranking of No. 283 achieved on 10 December 2018. Nagy has won three ITF singles titles and thirteen doubles titles.

Playing for Hungary in Davis Cup, Nagy has a W/L record of 4–5.

He is currently coaching Márton Fucsovics since 2022.

== Future and Challenger finals ==
=== Singles: 11 (3–8) ===
Legend
Challengers 0 (0–0)
Futures 11 (3–8)

Outcome	No.	Date	Tournament	Surface	Opponent	Score
Runner-up	1.	November 16, 2014	(United States) Niceville USA F31	Clay	(United States) Will Spencer	4–6, 6–2, 4–6
Winner	1.	July 26, 2015	Slovenská Ľupča Slovakia F2	Clay	(Czech Republic) Petr Michnev	6–3, 7–5
Runner-up	2.	May 15, 2016	Bol Croatia F6	Clay	(Serbia) Nikola Ćaćić	5–7, 4–6
Runner-up	3.	May 22, 2016	Bol Croatia F7	Clay	(Italy) Riccardo Bellotti	6–7^{(3–7)}, 0–6
Winner	2.	June 19, 2016	Warsaw Poland F4	Clay	(Poland) Marcin Gawron	6–4, 0–6, 6–4
Runner-up	4.	September 24, 2016	Dunakeszi Hungary F6	Clay	(Croatia) Kristijan Mesaroš	3–6, 2–6
Runner-up	5.	October 1, 2016	Balatonboglár Hungary F7	Clay	(India) Sumit Nagal	6–7^{(3–7)}, 1–6
Runner-up	6.	November 4, 2018	Antalya Turkey F34	Clay	(Spain) Javier Barranco Cosano	4–6, 1–6
Winner	3.	August 11, 2019	M15 Novi Sad, Serbia	Clay	(Serbia) Marko Miladinović	7–6^{(7–4)}, 6–4
Runner-up	7.	September 22, 2019	M15 Zlatibor, Serbia	Clay	(Bosnia and Herzegovina) Nerman Fatić	5–7, 3–6
Runner-up	8.	October 13, 2019	M15 Burgas, Bulgaria	Clay	(Italy) Fabrizio Ornago	3–6 ret.

=== Doubles 31 (13–18) ===
Legend
Challengers 0 (0–0)
Futures 31 (13–19)

Outcome	No.	Date	Tournament	Surface	Partner	Opponents	Score
Runner-up	1.	17 September 2011	Budapest, Hungary F1	Clay	(Hungary) Levente Gödry	(Chile) Hans Podlipnik Castillo (Austria) Marc Rath	6–2, 4–6, [3–10]
Winner	2.	27 July 2014	Valjevo, Serbia F6	Clay	(Hungary) Levente Gödry	(Montenegro) Ljubomir Čelebić (Italy) Davide Melchiorre	3–6, 6–4, [10–8]
Runner-up	3.	June 26, 2015	Slovenská Ľupča Slovakia F2	Clay	(Hungary) Gábor Borsos	(Italy) Francesco Borgo (Italy) Alessandro Colella	4–6, 4–6
Winner	4.	November 22, 2015	(United States) Pensacola, USA F33	Clay	(Canada) Denis Shapovalov	(United States) Christopher Ephron (Brazil) Bruno Savi	6–3, 6–2
Runner-up	5.	January 24, 2016	(United States) Sunrise, USA F4	Clay	(Canada) Denis Shapovalov	(Sweden) Isak Arvidsson (Japan) Kaichi Uchida	4–6, 4–6
Runner-up	6.	February 7, 2016	(United States) Palm Coast, USA F6	Clay	(United States) Will Spencer	(Chile) Nicolás Jarry (Chile) Juan Carlos Sáez	1–6, 2–6
Winner	7.	April 24, 2016	(United States) Orange Park, USA F14	Clay	(Canada) Denis Shapovalov	(Philippines) Ruben Gonzales (United States) Dennis Nevolo	6–2, 6–3
Runner-up	8.	August 28, 2016	Pörtschach, Austria F7	Clay	(Slovenia) Nik Razboršek	(Bolivia) Hugo Dellien (Bolivia) Federico Zeballos	3–6, 0–6
Runner-up	9.	September 11, 2016	Budapest, Hungary F4	Clay	(Hungary) Levente Gödry	(Hungary) Gábor Borsos (Hungary) Ádám Kellner	4–6, 6–1, [6–10]
Runner-up	10.	September 24, 2016	Dunakeszi, Hungary F6	Clay	(Hungary) Levente Gödry	(Hungary) Attila Balázs (Hungary) Gergely Kisgyörgy	1–6, 3–6
Runner-up	11.	May 28, 2017	Balatonalmádi, Hungary F3	Clay	(Hungary) Levente Gödry	(Hungary) Gábor Borsos (Hungary) Viktor Filipenkó	3–6, 4–6
Runner-up	12.	June 18, 2017	Gyula, Hungary F4	Clay	(Hungary) Levente Gödry	(Serbia) Nikola Ćaćić (Australia) Scott Puodziunas	6–7^{(2–7)}, 2–6
Winner	13.	July 2, 2017	Curtea de Argeș, Romania F5	Clay	(Colombia) Cristian Rodríguez	(Romania) Adrian Barbu (Switzerland) Riccardo Maiga	6–4, 7–6^{(8–6)}
Runner-up	14.	October 8, 2017	Antalya, Turkey F37	Clay	(Germany) Peter Torebko	(Brazil) Felipe Meligeni Alves (Brazil) Caio Silva	4–6, 3–6
Runner-up	15.	March 25, 2018	Opatija, Croatia F3	Clay	(Montenegro) Ljubomir Čelebić	(Argentina) Tomás Lipovšek Puches (Brazil) Bruno Sant'Anna	4–6, 1–6
Winner	16.	June 9, 2018	Padua, Italy F13	Clay	(Hungary) Gábor Borsos	(Romania) Vasile Antonescu (Romania) Bogdan Ionuț Apostol	6–2, 6–7^{(8–10)}, [10–7]
Runner-up	17.	August 12, 2018	Novi Sad, Serbia F1	Clay	(France) Florent Diep	(Serbia) Dejan Katić (Serbia) Goran Marković	W/O
Winner	18.	August 19, 2018	Novi Sad, Serbia F2	Clay	(Tunisia) Moez Echargui	(Bulgaria) Gabriel Donev (Bulgaria) Plamen Milushev	5–7, 6–4, [10–6]
Runner-up	19.	September 1, 2018	Székesfehérvár, Hungary F7	Clay	(Hungary) Levente Gödry	(Netherlands) Gijs Brouwer (Netherlands) Jelle Sels	7–6^{(7–4)}, 3–6, [5–10]
Winner	20.	September 30, 2018	Antalya, Turkey F29	Clay	(Belgium) Jeroen Vanneste	(Italy) Erik Crepaldi (Turkey) Koray Kırcı	6–4, 6–3
Winner	21.	October 13, 2018	Santa Margherita Di Pula, Italy F31	Clay	(Hungary) Gábor Borsos	(Austria) Matthias Haim (Germany) Jakob Sude	6–3, 0–6, [10–7]
Winner	22.	November 25, 2018	Stellenbosch, South Africa F1	Hard	(Hungary) Gábor Borsos	(United States) Connor Farren (United States) Christian Langmo	6–3, 7–6^{(7–4)}
Winner	23.	December 2, 2018	Stellenbosch, South Africa F2	Hard	(Hungary) Gábor Borsos	(Zimbabwe) Benjamin Lock (Zimbabwe) Courtney John Lock	7–6^{(7–1)}, 6–2
Winner	24.	January 20, 2019	M15 Monastir, Tunisia	Hard	(Hungary) Gábor Borsos	(Italy) Jannik Sinner (China) Zhang Zhizhen	6–1, 3–6, [10–7]
Winner	25.	May 12, 2019	M15 Piešťany, Slovakia	Clay	(Hungary) Fábián Marozsán	(Switzerland) Raphael Baltensperger (Russia) Matvey Khomentovskiy	7–6^{(7–2)}, 6–0
Runner-up	26.	August 17, 2019	M15 Novi Sad, Serbia	Clay	(China) Shen Ao	(Peru) Arklon Huertas del Pino (Peru) Conner Huertas del Pino	2–6, 3–6
Runner-up	27.	February 23, 2020	M15 Antalya, Turkey	Clay	(Hungary) Fábián Marozsán	(Romania) Călin Manda (Ukraine) Oleg Prihodko	6–2, 6–7^{(3–7)}, [8–10]
Runner-up	28.	March 1, 2020	M25 Antalya, Turkey	Clay	(Hungary) Fábián Marozsán	(Czech Republic) Jonáš Forejtek (Czech Republic) Michael Vrbenský	3–6, 4–6
Runner-up	29.	March 13, 2021	M15 Poreč, Croatia	Clay	(Hungary) Gergely Madarász	(Italy) Marco Bortolotti (Italy) Giovanni Fonio	2–6, 2–6
Runner-up	30.	September 18, 2021	(Croatia) M15 Zlatibor, Serbia	Clay	(Hungary) Gergely Madarász	(Russia) Yan Bondarevskiy (Ukraine) Oleg Prihodko	6–1, 0–6, [7–10]
Winner	31.	October 2, 2021	M25 Budapest, Hungary	Clay	(Hungary) Gábor Borsos	(Czech Republic) Filip Duda (Czech Republic) Jaroslav Pospíšil	6–7^{(4–7)}, 6–3, [13–11]

== Record against other players ==
Nagy's match record against players who have been ranked in the top 100, with those who are active in boldface.
ATP Tour, Challenger and Future tournaments' main draw and qualifying matches are considered.

Opponent	Highest ranking	Matches	Won	Lost	Win %	Last match
(Germany) **Alexander Zverev**	3	2	1	1	50%	Lost (2–6, 2–6) at 2019 Davis Cup Q
(Russia) **Andrey Rublev**	7	1	0	1	0%	Lost (2–6, 5–7) at 2013 United States F31 2R
(Italy) **Matteo Berrettini**	8	1	0	1	0%	Lost (3–6, 4–6) at 2018 Budapest Q1
(Canada) **Denis Shapovalov**	10	1	0	1	0%	Lost (3–6, 6–4, 4–6) at 2016 United States F14 2R
(Canada) **Félix Auger-Aliassime**	15	2	0	2	0%	Lost (3–6, 0–6) at 2017 United States F5 2R
(South Korea) **Chung Hyeon**	19	1	0	1	0%	Lost (2–6, 0–6) at 2017 Delray Beach Q1
(Romania) Victor Hănescu	26	1	0	1	0%	Lost (5–7, 1–6) at 2016 United States F7 2R
(Serbia) **Laslo Đere**	27	1	0	1	0%	Lost (4–6, 5–7) at 2014 Hungary F3 QF
(Israel) **Dudi Sela**	29	1	1	0	100%	Won (6–2, 6–3, 4–6, 4–6, 6–1) at 2016 Davis Cup 1R
(Serbia) **Miomir Kecmanović**	38	1	0	1	0%	Lost (2–6, 1–6) at 2017 United States F4 SF
(Japan) **Yoshihito Nishioka**	48	1	0	1	0%	Lost (3–6, 5–7) at 2011 United States F31 Q4
(Germany) **Dominik Koepfer**	50	1	1	0	100%	Won (6–2, 6–2) at 2017 United States F4 1R
(United States) **Tommy Paul**	50	4	1	3	25%	Lost (4–6, 4–6) at 2017 United States F6 QF
(Argentina) **Facundo Bagnis**	55	1	1	0	100%	Won (2–6, 7–6^{(7–4)}, 6–3) at 2017 Panama City Q3
(Bosnia and Herzegovina) **Mirza Bašić**	74	1	0	1	0%	Lost (6–4, 4–6, 3–6, 3–6) at 2015 Davis Cup 2R
(Hungary) **Attila Balázs**	76	4	0	4	0%	Lost (0–6, 1–6) at 2018 Turkey F6 1R
(Slovakia) **Norbert Gombos**	80	2	0	2	0%	Lost (7–6^{(7–3)}, 2–6, 4–6) at 2016 Budapest 1R
(Canada) **Brayden Schnur**	92	1	0	1	0%	Lost (2–6, 5–7) at 2013 United States F6 Q1
(Slovakia) **Andrej Martin**	93	1	0	1	0%	Lost (4–6, 2–6, 4–6) at 2016 Davis Cup 2R
Total		28	5	23	18%	* Statistics correct as of 30 August 2021

== Davis Cup ==
=== Participations: (4–6) ===
Group membership World Group (0–1) Qualifying Round (0–2) WG Play-off (1–0) Group I (1–2) Group II (2–1) Group III (0–0) Group IV (0–0)	Matches by surface Hard (0–3) Clay (4–3) Grass (0–0) Carpet (0–0)	Matches by type Singles (3–4) Doubles (1–2)

- ▲ ▼ indicates the outcome of the Davis Cup match followed by the score, date, place of event, the zonal classification and its phase, and the court surface.

Rubber outcome	No.	Rubber	Match type (partner if any)	Opponent nation	Opponent player(s)	Score
▲3–2; 17–19 July 2015; Siófok KC, Siófok, Hungary; Europe/Africa Zone Group II second round; clay surface
Defeat	1	II	Singles	Bosnia and Herzegovina	Mirza Bašić	6–4, 4–6, 3–6, 3–6
Victory	2	V	Singles	Bosnia and Herzegovina	Tomislav Brkić	6–4, 6–3, 6–3
▲3–2; 18-20 September 2015; Bulgarian National Tennis Center, Sofia, Bulgaria; Europe/Africa Zone Group II third round; clay surface
Victory	3	I	Singles	Bulgaria	Dimitar Kutrovsky	6–4, 6–0, 6–3
▲3–2; 4–6 March 2016; Hősök tere, Budapest, Hungary; Europe/Africa Zone Group I first round; clay surface
Victory	4	I	Singles	Israel	Dudi Sela	6–2, 6–3, 4–6, 4–6, 6–1
Defeat	5	V	Singles (dead rubber)	Israel	Amir Weintraub	7–5, 4–6, 2–6
▼0–3; 15-17 July 2016; Europe Tennis Center, Budapest, Hungary; Europe/Africa Zone Group I second round; clay surface
Defeat	6	I	Singles	Slovakia	Andrej Martin	4–6, 2–6, 4–6
▼2–3; 14–16 September 2018; Lurdy Ház, Budapest, Hungary; World Group play-off; clay surface
Victory	7	III	Doubles (with Gábor Borsos)	Czech Republic	Roman Jebavý / Lukáš Rosol	3–6, 4–6, 6–1, 6–2, 6–4
▼0–5; 1–2 February 2019; Fraport Arena, Frankfurt, Germany; Davis Cup qualifying round; hard (indoor) surface
Defeat	8	II	Singles	Germany	Alexander Zverev	2–6, 2–6
Defeat	9	III	Doubles (with Gábor Borsos)	Germany	Tim Pütz / Jan-Lennard Struff	2–6, 3–6
▼1–2; 28 November 2021; Pala Alpitour, Turin, Italy; Davis Cup Final Group D round robin; hard (indoor) surface
Defeat	10	III	Doubles (with Fábián Marozsán)	Croatia	Nikola Mektić / Mate Pavić	6–7^{(6–8)}, 2–6
