= Gábor Borsos =

Hungarian tennis player

- Country (sports): Hungary
- Residence: Siófok, Hungary
- Born: 30 June 1991 (age 34) Székesfehérvár, Hungary
- Height: 1.96 m (6 ft 5 in)
- Plays: Right-handed (two-handed backhand)
- Prize money: $56,334

Singles
- Career record: 1–4 (at ATP Tour level, Grand Slam level, and in Davis Cup)
- Career titles: 0
- Highest ranking: No. 551 (14 January 2019)

Doubles
- Career record: 2–3 (at ATP Tour level, Grand Slam level, and in Davis Cup)
- Career titles: 0; 0 Challenger, 25 Futures
- Highest ranking: No. 188 (13 November 2017)

Team competitions
- Davis Cup: 2–5

Gábor Borsos (born 30 June 1991) is a Hungarian tennis player.

Borsos has a career high ATP singles ranking of No. 551 achieved on 14 January 2019 and a career high ATP doubles ranking of No. 188 achieved on 13 November 2017. Borsos has won 25 ITF doubles titles.

Borsos has represented Hungary at Davis Cup, where he has a win–loss record of 2–5.

== Tour doubles titles – all levels (25) ==
Legend (singles)
Grand Slam (0)
Tennis Masters Cup (0)
ATP Masters Series (0)
ATP Tour (0)
Challengers (0)
Futures (24)

No.	Date	Tournament	Surface	Partner	Opponents in the final	Score
1.	7 September 2014	Bol, Croatia F16	Clay	(Italy) Antonio Mastrelia	(Netherlands) Sander Groen (Kazakhstan) Evgeny Korolev	7–5, 3–6, [10–6]
2.	16 May 2015	Bol, Croatia F9	Clay	(Hungary) Levente Gödry	(Canada) Martin Beran (Russia) Markos Kalovelonis	6–4, 7–5
3.	23 October 2015	Ramat HaSharon, Israel F14	Hard	(Hungary) Ádám Kellner	(Israel) Harel Levy (Israel) Noam Okun	6–4, 7–6^{(9–7)}
4.	6 May 2016	Szeged, Hungary F3	Clay	(Hungary) Ádám Kellner	(Romania) Victor Vlad Cornea (Czech Republic) Zdeněk Kolář	6–2, 6–1
5.	25 June 2016	Kaltenkirchen, Germany F4	Clay	(Hungary) Ádám Kellner	(Germany) Jonas Lütjen (Germany) Timon Reichelt	7–6^{(11–9)}, 6–4
6.	31 July 2016	(Georgia (country)) Telavi, Georgia F1	Clay	(Lithuania) Lukas Mugevičius	(Russia) Victor Baluda (Russia) Ilya Vasilyev	6–2, 2–6, [10–7]
7.	10 September 2016	Budapest, Hungary F4	Clay	(Hungary) Ádám Kellner	(Hungary) Levente Gödry (Hungary) Péter Nagy	6–4, 1–6, [10–6]
8.	7 October 2016	Balatonboglár, Hungary F8	Clay	(Hungary) Ádám Kellner	(Czech Republic) Zdeněk Kolář (Czech Republic) Pavel Nejedlý	3–6, 6–2, [10–8]
9.	13 November 2016	Stellenbosch, South Africa F2	Hard	(Switzerland) Luca Margaroli	(United Kingdom) James Marsalek (Spain) Jordi Samper-Montaña	6–2, 6–3
10.	20 November 2016	Stellenbosch, South Africa F3	Hard	(Switzerland) Luca Margaroli	(Peru) Alexander Merino (Germany) Christoph Negritu	7–6^{(8–6)}, 5–7, [10–5]
11.	19 March 2017	Ramat HaSharon, Israel F1	Hard	(Lithuania) Laurynas Grigelis	(Israel) Dekel Bar (Israel) Yshai Oliel	6–3, 6–4
12.	25 March 2017	Ramat HaSharon, Israel F2	Hard	(Israel) Dekel Bar	(Hungary) Viktor Filipenkó (Hungary) Levente Gödry	6–4, 6–4
13.	14 May 2017	Zalaegerszeg, Hungary F1	Clay	(Hungary) Attila Balázs	(Austria) Pascal Brunner (Austria) David Pichler	6–4, 6–2
14.	28 May 2017	Balatonalmádi, Hungary F2	Clay	(Hungary) Viktor Filipenkó	(Hungary) Levente Gödry (Hungary) Péter Nagy	6–3, 6–4
15.	5 November 2017	Sharm El Sheikh, Egypt F32	Hard	(Ukraine) Vladyslav Manafov	(Ukraine) Olexiy Kolisnyk (Ukraine) Oleg Prihodko	7–6^{(7–2)}, 7–5
16.	4 March 2018	Heraklion, Greece F1	Hard	(Serbia) Danilo Petrović	(Switzerland) Adrian Bodmer (Germany) Jakob Sude	5–7, 6–4, [10–6]
17.	6 May 2018	Wisła, Poland F1	Clay	(Poland) Paweł Ciaś	(Poland) Daniel Kossek (Poland) Maciej Smoła	6–1, 7–5
18.	9 June 2018	Padova, Italy F13	Clay	(Hungary) Péter Nagy	(Romania) Vasile Antonescu (Romania) Bogdan Ionuț Apostol	6–2, 6–7^{(8–10)}, [10–7]
19.	29 June 2018	Pardubice, Czech Republic F4	Clay	(Austria) David Pichler	(Brazil) Rafael Matos (Brazil) Marcelo Zormann	1–6, 6–2, [10–6]
20.	13 October 2018	Santa Margherita Di Pula, Italy F31	Clay	(Hungary) Péter Nagy	(Austria) Matthias Haim (Germany) Jakob Sude	6–3, 0–6, [10–7]
21.	25 November 2018	Stellenbosch, South Africa F1	Hard	(Hungary) Péter Nagy	(United States) Connor Farren (United States) Christian Langmo	6–3, 7–6^{(7–4)}
22.	2 December 2018	Stellenbosch, South Africa F2	Hard	(Hungary) Péter Nagy	(Zimbabwe) Benjamin Lock (Zimbabwe) Courtney John Lock	7–6^{(7–1)}, 6–2
23.	20 January 2019	M15 Monastir, Tunisia	Hard	(Hungary) Péter Nagy	(Italy) Jannik Sinner (China) Zhang Zhizhen	6–1, 3–6, [10–7]
24.	2 June 2019	M25 Gyula, Hungary	Clay	(Hungary) Fábián Marozsán	(Russia) Alexander Igoshin (Russia) Evgenii Tiurnev	7–6^{(9–7)}, 2–6, [12–10]
25.	2 October 2021	M25 Budapest, Hungary	Clay	(Hungary) Péter Nagy	(Czech Republic) Filip Duda (Czech Republic) Jaroslav Pospíšil	6–7^{(4–7)}, 6–3, [13–11]

== Davis Cup ==
=== Participations: (2–5) ===
Group membership World Group (0–0) Qualifying Round (0–2) WG Play-off (1–0) Group I (0–1) Group II (1–2) Group III (0–0) Group IV (0–0)	Matches by surface Hard (1–3) Clay (1–2) Grass (0–0) Carpet (0–0)	Matches by type Singles (1–4) Doubles (1–1)

- ▲ ▼ indicates the outcome of the Davis Cup match followed by the score, date, place of event, the zonal classification and its phase, and the court surface.

Rubber outcome	No.	Rubber	Match type (partner if any)	Opponent nation	Opponent player(s)	Score
▲4–1; 6–8 March 2015; Városi Egyetemi Csarnok, Győr, Hungary; Europe/Africa first round; hard (indoor) surface
Defeat	1	I	Singles	Moldova	Radu Albot	3–6, 2–6, 5–7
Victory	2	V	Singles	Moldova	Maxim Bulat	6–0, 6–3
▲3–2; 18–20 September 2015; National Tennis Center, Sofia, Bulgaria; Europe/Africa third round; clay surface
Defeat	3	V	Singles	Bulgaria	Dimitar Kuzmanov	2–6, 7–6^{(7–2)}, 2–6
▲3–2; 4–6 March 2016; Hősök tere, Budapest, Hungary; Europe/Africa first round; clay (indoor) surface
Defeat	4	IV	Singles	Israel	Edan Leshem	6–4, 4–6, 6–7^{(3–7)}
▼2–3; 14–16 September 2018; Lurdy Ház, Budapest, Hungary; World Group play-off; clay surface
Victory	5	III	Doubles (with Péter Nagy)	Czech Republic	Roman Jebavý / Lukáš Rosol	3–6, 4–6, 6–1, 6–2, 6–4
▼0–5; 1–2 February 2019; Fraport Arena, Frankfurt, Germany; Davis Cup qualifying round; hard (indoor) surface
Defeat	6	III	Doubles (with Péter Nagy)	Germany	Tim Pütz / Jan-Lennard Struff	2–6, 3–6
Defeat	7	IV	Singles (dead rubber)	Germany	Alexander Zverev	3–6, 4–6
