= Pedro Sousa =

Portuguese tennis player (born 1988)

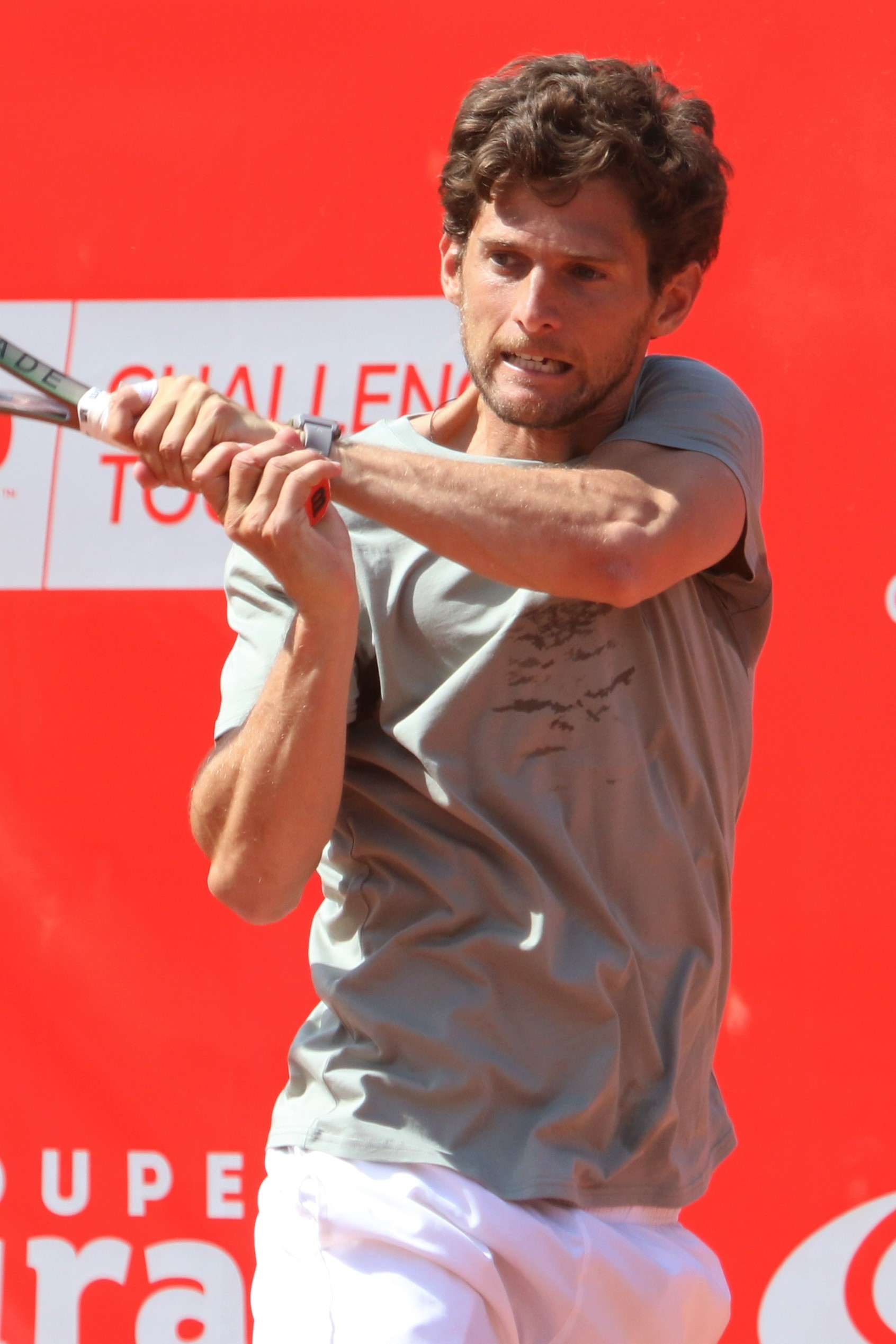
- Sousa at the 2022 BNP Paribas Primrose Bordeaux
- Full name: Pedro Barreiros Cardoso de Sousa
- Country (sports): Portugal
- Residence: Vale Travesso, Portugal
- Born: 27 May 1988 (age 38) Lisbon, Portugal
- Height: 1.80 m (5 ft 11 in)
- Turned pro: 2007
- Retired: October 2023
- Plays: Right-handed (two-handed backhand)
- Coach: Rui Machado
- Prize money: US$1,118,975

Singles
- Career record: 18–33
- Career titles: 0
- Highest ranking: No. 99 (18 February 2019)

Grand Slam singles results
- Australian Open: 1R (2019, 2021)
- French Open: Q3 (2012, 2017, 2022)
- Wimbledon: 1R (2021)
- US Open: 1R (2020)

Other tournaments
- Olympic Games: 1R (2021)

Doubles
- Career record: 7–11
- Career titles: 0
- Highest ranking: No. 241 (22 July 2013)

Other doubles tournaments
- Olympic Games: 1R (2021)
- Last updated on: 3 April 2023.

Pedro Barreiros Cardoso de Sousa (Portuguese pronunciation: [ˈpeðɾu ˈsozɐ]; born 27 May 1988) is a Portuguese tennis coach and a former professional player who primarily competed on the ATP Challenger Tour. He reached a career-high singles ranking of world No. 99 in February 2019.

== Professional Career ==
He reached his first ATP final as a lucky loser at the 2020 Argentina Open after the withdrawal of top seed Diego Schwartzman in the semifinals but lost to Casper Ruud in the championship match. He had never reached a tour-level quarterfinal prior to this tournament, becoming only the third player from Portugal in the Open Era to reach a tour-level final.

In April 2023, using a qualification wildcard, Sousa qualified into the main draw for his last appearance at an ATP Tour event and his home tournament, the 2023 Estoril Open. He also announced his retirement from professional tennis, the 2023 Lisboa Belém Open Challenger being his final event. He retired on 6 October 2023.

== Coaching Career ==
In 2024, Sousa started coaching Henrique Rocha. Sousa is also currently coaching another compatriot, Jaime Faria, alongside Rocha.

== ATP career finals ==
=== Singles: 1 (1 runner-up) ===
Legend Grand Slam (0–0) ATP Finals (0–0) ATP Masters 1000 (0–0) ATP 500 Series (0–0) ATP 250 Series (0–1)	Titles by surface Hard (0–0) Clay (0–1) Grass (0–0)	Titles by setting Outdoor (0–1) Indoor (0–0)

Result	W–L	Date	Tournament	Tier	Surface	Opponent	Score
Loss	0–1	Feb 2020	Argentina Open, Argentina	250 Series	Clay	(Norway) Casper Ruud	1–6, 4–6

== Challenger and Futures finals ==
=== Singles: 35 (17 titles, 18 runner-ups) ===
Legend (singles) ATP Challenger Tour (8–8) ITF Futures Tour (9–10)	Titles by surface Hard (2–2) Clay (15–16) Grass (0–0) Carpet (0–0)

Result	W–L	Date	Tournament	Tier	Surface	Opponent	Score
Win	1–0	Aug 2009	Spain F25, Dénia	Futures	Clay	(Spain) Gerard Granollers Pujol	6–0, 6–2
Loss	1–1	Oct 2009	Brazil F22, Bauru	Futures	Clay	(Brazil) Rafael Camilo	1–6, 4–6
Loss	1–2	Mar 2011	Portugal F1, Faro	Futures	Hard	(Slovakia) Kamil Čapkovič	4–6, 6–3, 2–6
Loss	1–3	Feb 2012	Spain F3, Murcia	Futures	Clay	(Canada) Steven Diez	6–2, 4–6, 3–6
Win	2–3	Mar 2012	Portugal F1, Faro	Futures	Hard	(Italy) Claudio Grassi	6–4, 7–6^{(8–6)}
Loss	2–4	Jan 2013	USA F1, Plantation	Futures	Clay	(Romania) Victor Crivoi	2–6, 4–6
Loss	2–5	Feb 2013	Portugal F1, Vale do Lobo	Futures	Hard	(Belgium) Niels Desein	6–7^{(3–7)}, 2–6
Win	3–5	Mar 2013	Portugal F2, Loulé	Futures	Hard	(Portugal) Rui Machado	5–7, 6–4, 7–6^{(7–3)}
Loss	3–6	Nov 2013	Guayaquil, Ecuador	Challenger	Clay	(Argentina) Leonardo Mayer	4–6, 5–7
Win	4–6	Jan 2016	Tunisia F1, Hammamet	Futures	Clay	(France) Jordan Ubiergo	6–0, 1–2 ret.
Loss	4–7	Jan 2016	Tunisia F2, Hammamet	Futures	Clay	(Serbia) Miljan Zekić	3–6, 3–6
Loss	4–8	Feb 2016	Tunisia F4, Hammamet	Futures	Clay	(Germany) Jeremy Jahn	6–4, 6–7^{(5–7)}, 4–6
Win	5–8	Mar 2016	Tunisia F9, Hammamet	Futures	Clay	(Spain) Alberto Romero de Ávila Senise	6–4, 6–2
Loss	5–9	Mar 2016	Tunisia F10, Hammamet	Futures	Clay	(Belgium) Arthur De Greef	6–1, 1–6, 2–6
Win	6–9	Mar 2016	Tunisia F11, Hammamet	Futures	Clay	(Belgium) Joris De Loore	1–6, 6–1, 7–5
Loss	6–10	Apr 2016	Tunisia F12, Hammamet	Futures	Clay	(United Kingdom) Alexander Ward	6–7^{(6–8)}, 0–6
Loss	6–11	May 2016	Tunisia F17, Hammamet	Futures	Clay	(Spain) Oriol Roca Batalla	3–6, 4–6
Win	7–11	May 2016	Tunisia F18, Hammamet	Futures	Clay	(Spain) Oriol Roca Batalla	6–3, 6–1
Win	8–11	May 2016	Tunisia F19, Hammamet	Futures	Clay	(Russia) Alexander Zhurbin	6–2, 6–1
Win	9–11	Jun 2016	Netherlands F1, Alkmaar	Futures	Clay	(Brazil) José Pereira	3–6, 7–5, 6–3
Win	10–11	Apr 2017	Francavilla, Italy	Challenger	Clay	(Italy) Alessandro Giannessi	6–3, 7–6^{(7–3)}
Loss	10–12	Jul 2017	Tampere, Finland	Challenger	Clay	(France) Calvin Hemery	3–6, 4–6
Win	11–12	Aug 2017	Liberec, Czech Republic	Challenger	Clay	(Brazil) Guilherme Clezar	6–4, 5–7, 6–2
Win	12–12	Sep 2017	Como, Italy	Challenger	Clay	(Italy) Marco Cecchinato	1–6, 6–2, 6–4
Win	13–12	May 2018	Braga, Portugal	Challenger	Clay	(Norway) Casper Ruud	6–0, 3–6, 6–3
Loss	13–13	Aug 2018	Liberec, Czech Republic	Challenger	Clay	(Slovakia) Andrej Martin	1–6, 2–6
Win	14–13	Aug 2018	Pullach, Germany	Challenger	Clay	(Germany) Jan-Lennard Struff	6–1, 6–3
Loss	14–14	Oct 2018	Lima, Peru	Challenger	Clay	(Chile) Cristian Garín	4–6, 4–6
Loss	14–15	Nov 2018	Guayaquil, Ecuador	Challenger	Clay	(Argentina) Guido Andreozzi	5–7, 6–1, 4–6
Win	15–15	Jun 2019	Blois, France	Challenger	Clay	(Belgium) Kimmer Coppejans	4–6, 6–3, 7–6^{(7–4)}
Win	16–15	Aug 2019	Meerbusch, Germany	Challenger	Clay	(Serbia) Peđa Krstin	7–6^{(7–4)}, 4–6, 6–3
Loss	16–16	Sep 2019	Florence, Italy	Challenger	Clay	(Argentina) Marco Trungelliti	2–6, 3–6
Loss	16–17	Oct 2020	Split, Croatia	Challenger	Clay	(Argentina) Francisco Cerúndolo	6–4, 3–6, 6–7^{(4–7)}
Loss	16–18	Oct 2020	Lisbon, Portugal	Challenger	Clay	(Spain) Jaume Munar	6–7^{(3–7)}, 2–6
Win	17–18	Dec 2020	Maia, Portugal	Challenger	Clay	(Spain) Carlos Taberner	6–0, 5–7, 6–2

=== Doubles: 12 (5 titles, 7 runner-ups) ===
Legend (doubles) ATP Challenger Tour (0–3) ITF Futures Tour (5–4)	Titles by surface Hard (2–1) Clay (3–6) Grass (0–0) Carpet (0–0)

Result	W–L	Date	Tournament	Tier	Surface	Partner	Opponents	Score
Loss	0–1	Oct 2006	Portugal F6, Ponta Delgada	Futures	Hard	(Portugal) Gastão Elias	(Finland) Tuomas Ketola (Finland) Juho Paukku	7–6^{(7–4)}, 3–6, 4–6
Loss	0–2	Jul 2008	Spain F25, Alicante	Futures	Clay	(Portugal) Tiago Godinho	(Spain) David Ollivier Baquero (Spain) Carlos Rexach Itoiz	5–7, 1–6
Win	1–2	Feb 2012	USA F4, Palm Coast	Futures	Clay	(Sweden) Christian Lindell	(United States) Vahid Mirzadeh (United States) Michael Shabaz	6–7^{(7–9)}, 6–3, [10–8]
Win	2–2	Feb 2012	Spain F2, Mallorca	Futures	Clay	(Portugal) Gonçalo Falcão	(Spain) Miguel Ángel López Jaén (Spain) Carlos Poch Gradin	6–4, 3–6, [10–6]
Win	3–2	Mar 2012	Portugal F1, Faro	Futures	Hard	(Portugal) Gonçalo Falcão	(Hungary) Dénes Lukács (Germany) Steven Moneke	7–5, 6–4
Loss	3–3	Aug 2012	Italy F20, La Spezia	Futures	Clay	(Colombia) Alejandro González	(Colombia) Cristian Rodríguez (Colombia) Óscar Rodríguez	6–7^{(1–7)}, 4–6
Loss	3–4	Oct 2012	Rio de Janeiro, Brazil	Challenger	Clay	(Portugal) Fred Gil	(Brazil) Marcelo Demoliner (Brazil) João Souza	2–6, 4–6
Win	4–4	Jan 2013	USA F1, Plantation	Futures	Clay	(Croatia) Franko Škugor	(Portugal) João Domingues (Burundi) Hassan Ndayishimiye	6–2, 6–3
Win	5–4	Feb 2013	Portugal F1, Vale do Lobo	Futures	Hard	(Portugal) Gonçalo Falcão	(Spain) Juan-Samuel Arauzo-Martínez (Spain) Jaime Pulgar-García	6–3, 6–4
Loss	5–5	Jan 2016	Tunisia F1, Hammamet	Futures	Clay	(Portugal) Fred Gil	(Germany) Stephan Hoiss (Germany) Jeremy Jahn	4–6, 1–6
Loss	5–6	Jul 2019	Ludwigshafen, Germany	Challenger	Clay	(Portugal) João Domingues	(United States) Nathaniel Lammons (Brazil) Fernando Romboli	6–7^{(4–7)}, 1–6
Loss	5–7	Sep 2019	Como, Italy	Challenger	Clay	(Brazil) Fabrício Neis	(Germany) Andre Begemann (Romania) Florin Mergea	7–5, 5–7, [12–14]

== ITF Junior Circuit ==
=== Singles: 3 (3 titles) ===
Legend Grade A (0–0) Grade 1 (1–0) Grade 2 (1–0) Grade 3 (1–0) Grade 4 (0–0) Grade 5 (0–0)	Titles by surface Hard (1–0) Clay (2–0) Grass (0–0) Carpet (0–0)	Titles by setting Outdoors (3–0) Indoors (0–0)

Result	Date	Tournament	Tier	Surface	Opponent	Score
Win	Apr 2005	3rd SFAX ITF Junior Tournament, Tunisia	Grade 3	Hard	(Kuwait) Ahmad Rabeea Muhammad	6–2, 6–0
Win	Apr 2006	Istres International Junior Tournament, France	Grade 2	Clay	(France) Stéphane Piro	6–3, 7–6^{(7–0)}
Win	Jul 2006	12th Sportastic Junior Open Wels, Austria	Grade 1	Clay	(Italy) Matteo Trevisan	6–2, 6–4

== Performance timelines ==
Key
W	F	SF	QF	#R	RR	Q#	P#	DNQ	A	Z#	PO	G	S	B	NMS	NTI	P	NH

(W) winner; (F) finalist; (SF) semifinalist; (QF) quarterfinalist; (#R) rounds 4, 3, 2, 1; (RR) round-robin stage; (Q#) qualification round; (P#) preliminary round; (DNQ) did not qualify; (A) absent; (Z#) Davis/Fed Cup Zonal Group (with number indication) or (PO) play-off; (G) gold, (S) silver or (B) bronze Olympic/Paralympic medal; (NMS) not a Masters tournament; (NTI) not a Tier I tournament; (P) postponed; (NH) not held; (SR) strike rate (events won / competed); (W–L) win–loss record.
To avoid confusion and double counting, these charts are updated at the conclusion of a tournament or when the player's participation has ended.

=== Singles ===
Current through the 2021 US Open.

Tournament	2006	2007	2008	2009	2010	2011	2012	2013	2014	2015	2016	2017	2018	2019	2020	2021	SR	W–L	Win%
Grand Slam tournaments
Australian Open	A	A	A	A	A	A	A	A	A	A	A	Q1	A	1R	Q1	1R	0 / 2	0–2	0%
French Open	A	A	A	A	A	A	Q3	Q1	A	Q1	A	Q3	Q2	A	Q1	Q1	0 / 0	0–0	–
Wimbledon	A	A	A	A	A	A	Q1	A	A	Q1	A	Q3	A	A	NH	1R	0 / 1	0–1	–
US Open	A	A	A	A	A	A	Q1	A	Q1	Q1	Q1	Q1	A	A	1R	Q1	0 / 1	0–1	0%
Win–loss	0–0	0–0	0–0	0–0	0–0	0–0	0–0	0–0	0–0	0–0	0–0	0–0	0–0	0–1	0–1	0–2	0 / 4	0–4	0%
National representation
Summer Olympics	NH			NH			A	NH			A	NH				1R	0 / 1	0–1	0%
Davis Cup	Z1	Z1	A	A	Z2	A	A	Z2	A	A	Z1	Z1	Z1	RR	Z1		0 / 8	10–5	67%
Career statistics
Tournaments	0	1	0	0	0	1	1	1	0	0	1	1	2	7	3	8	26		
Titles	0	0	0	0	0	0	0	0	0	0	0	0	0	0	0	0	0		
Finals	0	0	0	0	0	0	0	0	0	0	0	0	0	0	1	0	1		
Hard win–loss	0–0	0–0	0–0	0–0	0–0	0–0	0–0	0–0	0–0	0–0	0–1	0–0	0–1	0–4	1–1	1–4	0 / 7	2–11	15%
Clay win–loss	0–1	0–1	0–0	0–0	1–0	0–1	0–1	2–1	0–0	0–0	1–1	4–1	3–2	0–5	3–2	1–3	0 / 18	14–18	42%
Grass win–loss	0–0	0–0	0–0	0–0	0–0	0–0	0–0	0–0	0–0	0–0	0–0	0–0	0–0	0–0	0–0	0–1	0 / 1	0–1	0%
Carpet win–loss	0–0	1–0	0–0	Discontinued													0 / 0	1–0	100%
Outdoor win–loss	0–1	0–1	0–0	0–0	0–0	0–1	0–1	1–1	0–0	0–0	1–1	2–1	3–3	0–6	3–3	2–8	0 / 25	12–27	31%
Indoor win–loss	0–0	1–0	0–0	0–0	1–0	0–0	0–0	1–0	0–0	0–0	0–1	2–0	0–0	0–3	1–0	0–0	0 / 1	6–4	60%
Overall win–loss	0–1	1–1	0–0	0–0	1–0	0–1	0–1	2–1	0–0	0–0	1–2	4–1	3–3	0–9	4–3	2–8	0 / 26	18–31	37%
Win (%)	0%	50%	–	–	100%	0%	0%	67%	–	–	33%	80%	50%	0%	57%	20%	36.73%		
Year-end ranking	988	1479	1071	434	479	338	265	200	1037	786	188	126	104	140	105	146	$1,118,975		

=== Doubles ===
Tournament	2006	2007	2008	2009	2010	2011	2012	2013	2014	2015	2016	2017	2018	2019	2020	2021	SR	W–L	Win%
National representation
Summer Olympics	NH		A	NH			A	NH			A	NH				1R	0 / 1	0–1	–
Davis Cup	Z1	Z1	A	A	Z2	A	A	Z2	A	A	Z1	Z1	Z1	RR	Z1		0 / 8	3–0	100%
Career statistics
Tournaments	0	1	0	1	1	1	1	1	0	1	1	0	1	1	0	3	13		
Titles	0	0	0	0	0	0	0	0	0	0	0	0	0	0	0	0	0		
Finals	0	0	0	0	0	0	0	0	0	0	0	0	0	0	0	0	0		
Hard win–loss	0–0	0–0	0–0	0–0	0–0	0–0	0–0	0–0	0–0	0–0	0–0	0–0	0–0	1–0	1–0	0–1	0 / 1	2–1	67%
Clay win–loss	0–0	0–1	0–0	0–1	2–1	0–1	0–1	2–1	0–0	0–1	0–1	0–0	1–1	0–1	0–0	0–2	0 / 12	5–12	29%
Grass win–loss	0–0	0–0	0–0	0–0	0–0	0–0	0–0	0–0	0–0	0–0	0–0	0–0	0–0	0–0	0–0	0–0	0 / 0	0–0	–
Outdoor win–loss	0–0	0–1	0–0	0–1	2–1	0–1	0–1	1–1	0–0	0–1	0–1	0–0	1–1	0–1	0–0	0–3	0 / 13	4–13	24%
Indoor win–loss	0–0	0–0	0–0	0–0	0–0	0–0	0–0	1–0	0–0	0–0	0–0	0–0	0–0	1–0	1–0	0–0	0 / 0	3–0	100%
Overall win–loss	0–0	0–1	0–0	0–1	2–1	0–1	0–1	2–1	0–0	0–1	0–1	0–0	1–1	1–1	1–0	0–3	0 / 13	7–13	35%
Win (%)	–	0%	–	0%	67%	0%	0%	67%	–	0%	0%	–	50%	50%	100%		35%		
Year-end ranking	1257	680	1208	1032	446	771	323	416	–	1172	564	–	283	303	301				

== Record against top 10 players ==
Sousa's match record against players who have been ranked in the top 10. Only ATP Tour main draw and Davis Cup matches are considered.

- (France) Gilles Simon 1–0
- (Argentina) Juan Martín del Potro 0–1
- (Belgium) David Goffin 0–1
- (Latvia) Ernests Gulbis 0–1
- (Spain) Fernando Verdasco 0–1
- (Switzerland) Stan Wawrinka 0–1

* As of 8 February 2021.

== Career earnings ==
Year	Majors	ATP wins	Total wins	Earnings	References
2006	0	0	0	$1,883	
2007	0	0	0	$9,942	
2008	0	0	0	$2,724	
2009	0	0	0	$11,319	
2010	0	0	0	$14,123	
2011	0	0	0	$19,242	
2012	0	0	0	$46,234	
2013	0	0	0	$36,887	
2014	0	0	0	$8,833	
2015	0	0	0	$21,981	
2016	0	0	0	$39,820	
2017	0	0	0	$109,827	
2018	0	0	0	$101,179	
2019	0	0	0	$149,893	
2020	0	0	0	$177,969	
Career *	0	0	0	$814,521	

* As of 10 April 2017.

== National participation ==
=== Davis Cup (9 wins, 3 losses) ===
Sousa debuted for the Portugal Davis Cup team in 2006 and has played 12 matches in 11 ties. His singles record is 8–3 and his doubles record is 1–0 (9–3 overall).

Group membership World Group (0–0) WG Play-off (1–0) Group I (4–3) Group II (4–0) Group III (0–0) Group IV (0–0)	Matches by surface Hard (0–2) Clay (8–1) Grass (0–0) Carpet (1–0)	Matches by Type Singles (8–3) Doubles (1–0)	Matches by Setting Indoors (6–1) Outdoors (3–2)	Matches by Venue Portugal (8–1) Away (1–2)

- ▲ ▼ indicates the result of the Davis Cup match followed by the score, date, place of event, the zonal classification and its phase, and the court surface.

Rubber result	Rubber	Match type (partner if any)	Opponent nation	Opponent player(s)	Score
▲3–2; 22–24 September 2006; Royale Tennis Club de Marrakesh, Marrakesh, Morocco; Group I Europe/Africa relegation play-off; clay surface
Defeat	V	Singles (dead rubber)	Morocco	Mehdi Tahiri	6–7^{(2–7)}, 6–4, 2–6
▼2–3; 9–11 February 2007; Tbilisi Sport Palace, Tbilisi, Georgia; Group I Europe/Africa first round; carpet(i) surface
Victory	IV	Singles (dead rubber)	(Georgia (country)) Georgia	George Chantouria	6–2, 6–4
▲4–1; 5–7 March 2010; Complexo de Ténis da Maia, Maia, Portugal; Group II Europe/Africa first round; clay(i) surface
Victory	IV	Singles (dead rubber)	Denmark	Frederik Nielsen	6–7^{(3–7)}, 6–1, 6–1
▲5–0; 1–3 February 2013; Club Internacional de Foot-ball, Lisbon, Portugal; Group II Europe/Africa first round; clay(i) surface
Victory	II	Singles	Benin	Alexis Klegou	4–6, 6–1, 6–4, 6–2
Victory	III	Doubles (with João Sousa)	Benin	Alexis Klegou / Loic Didavi	6–2, 6–1, 6–1
▲5–0; 5–7 April 2013; Club Internacional de Foot-ball, Lisbon, Portugal; Group II Europe/Africa quarterfinal; clay surface
Victory	II	Singles	Lithuania	Dovydas Šakinis	6–2, 6–4, 6–0
▼1–4; 4–6 March 2016; Pavilhão Vitória Sport Clube, Guimarães, Portugal; Group I Europe/Africa first round; hard(i) surface
Defeat	V	Singles (dead rubber)	Austria	Dennis Novak	4–6, 3–6
▲5–0; 16–18 September 2016; Clube de Ténis de Viana, Viana do Castelo, Portugal; Group I Europe/Africa second round playoffs; clay surface
Victory	IV	Singles (dead rubber)	Slovenia	Tomislav Ternar	6–0, 6–4
▲5–0; 3–5 February 2017; Club Internacional de Foot-ball, Lisbon, Portugal; Group I Europe/Africa first round; clay(i) surface
Victory	V	Singles (dead rubber)	Israel	Yshai Oliel	6–2, 6–0
▲4–1; 7–9 April 2017; Club Internacional de Foot-ball, Lisbon, Portugal; Group I Europe/Africa second round; clay(i) surface
Victory	V	Singles (dead rubber)	Ukraine	Illya Beloborodko	6–0, 6–1
▼2–3; 15–17 September 2017; Centro de Tenis do Jamor, Oeiras, Portugal; World Group play-offs; clay surface
Victory	II	Singles	Germany	Jan-Lennard Struff	6–2, 7–5, 7–6^{(7–5)}
▼1–3; 14–15 September 2018; Campa Tennis Club, Bucha, Ukraine; Group I Europe/Africa Relegation Play-Off first round; hard surface
Defeat	II	Singles	Ukraine	Sergiy Stakhovsky	3–6, 2–6
