= Viktor Filipenkó =

Hungarian tennis player

- Country (sports): Hungary
- Residence: Budapest, Hungary
- Born: 25 September 1991 (age 33); Budapest, Hungary
- Plays: Right-handed (two-handed backhand)
- Prize money: $28,144

Singles
- Career record: 0–3 (at ATP Tour level, Grand Slam level, and in Davis Cup)
- Career titles: 0
- Highest ranking: No. 692 (29 July 2013)

Doubles
- Career record: 0–0 (at ATP Tour level, Grand Slam level, and in Davis Cup)
- Career titles: 0; 0 Challenger, 2 Futures
- Highest ranking: No. 709 (22 July 2013)

Team competitions
- Davis Cup: 1–3
- Last updated on: 17 June 2019.

Viktor Filipenkó (born 25 September 1991) is a Hungarian tennis player.

Filipenkó has a career high ATP singles ranking of 692 achieved on 29 July 2013. He also has a career high ATP doubles ranking of 709, achieved on 22 July 2013. Filipenkó has won 2 ITF doubles titles.

Filipenkó has represented Hungary at Davis Cup, where he has a win–loss record of 1–3.

== Future and Challenger finals ==
=== Singles: 1 (0–1) ===
Legend
Challengers 0 (0–0)
Futures 1 (0–1)

Outcome	No.	Date	Tournament	Surface	Opponent	Score
Runner-up	1.	July 29, 2012	Kikinda, Serbia F6	Clay	(Bosnia and Herzegovina) Aldin Šetkić	1–6, 2–6

=== Doubles 9 (2–7) ===
Legend
Challengers 0 (0–0)
Futures 9 (2–7)

Outcome	No.	Date	Tournament	Surface	Partner	Opponents	Score
Winner	1.	9 March 2013	Netanya, Israel F5	Hard	(Hungary) Levente Gödry	(Greece) Alexandros Jakupovic (Czech Republic) Michal Schmid	6–4, 4–6, [10–5]
Runner-up	2.	May 5, 2013	Antalya, Turkey F17	Hard	(Serbia) Denis Bejtulahi	(Japan) Hiroyasu Ehara (Germany) Tobias Klein	6–7^{(3–7)}, 1–6
Runner-up	3.	June 20, 2014	Siófok, Hungary F3	Clay	(Austria) Tristan-Samuel Weissborn	(Chile) Cristóbal Saavedra Corvalán (Chile) Ricardo Urzúa-Rivera	1–6, 1–6
Runner-up	4.	June 14, 2015	Belgrade, Serbia F1	Clay	(Serbia) Denis Bejtulahi	(Russia) Kirill Dmitriev (Kazakhstan) Dmitry Popko	2–6, 6–3, [6–10]
Runner-up	5.	August 14, 2016	Novi Sad, Serbia F4	Clay	(Croatia) Antun Vidak	(Germany) Christian Hirschmüller (Serbia) Luka Ilić	7–5, 2–6, [9–11]
Runner-up	6.	March 25, 2017	Ramat HaSharon, Israel F2	Hard	(Hungary) Levente Gödry	(Israel) Dekel Bar (Hungary) Gábor Borsos	4–6, 4–6
Runner-up	7.	April 1, 2017	Tel Aviv, Israel F3	Hard	(Hungary) Gábor Borsos	(Argentina) Matías Franco Descotte (Chile) Juan Carlos Sáez	4–6, 4–6
Winner	8.	May 28, 2017	Balatonalmádi, Hungary F3	Clay	(Hungary) Gábor Borsos	(Hungary) Levente Gödry (Hungary) Péter Nagy	6–3, 6–4
Runner-up	7.	October 29, 2017	Heraklion, Greece F6	Hard	(Serbia) Darko Jandrić	(Czech Republic) Dominik Kellovský (Czech Republic) Václav Šafránek	7–6^{(7–4)}, 3–6, [7–10]

== Davis Cup ==
=== Participations: (1–3) ===
Group membership World Group (0–0) WG play-off (0–0) Group I (0–0) Group II (0–3) Group III (1–0) Group IV (0–0)	Matches by surface Hard (0–3) Clay (1–0) Grass (0–0) Carpet (0–0)	Matches by type Singles (0–3) Doubles (1–0)

- ▲ ▼ indicates the outcome of the Davis Cup match followed by the score, date, place of event, the zonal classification and its phase, and the court surface.

Rubber outcome	No.	Rubber	Match type (partner if any)	Opponent nation	Opponent player(s)	Score
▼2–3; 1–3 February 2013; Manejul de Atletică Ușoară, Chișinău, Moldova; Europe/Africa first round; hard (indoor) surface
Defeat	1	II	Singles	Moldova	Radu Albot	1–6, 3–6, 3–6
Defeat	2	V	Singles	Moldova	Maxim Dubarenco	6–4, 3–6, 3–6, 6–7^{(4–7)}
▼1–4; 5–7 April 2013; Budapesti Elektromos Sportegyesület Sportcsarnoka, Budapest, Hungary; Europe/Africa relegation play-off; hard (indoor) surface
Defeat	3	V	Singles	Luxembourg	Gilles Kremer	7–6^{(9–7)}, 4–6, 6–7^{(5–7)}
▲3–0; 8 May 2014; Gellért Szabadidőközpont, Szeged, Hungary; Europe/Africa round robin; clay surface
Victory	4	III	Doubles (with Levente Gödry)	Liechtenstein	Robin Forster / Christian Meier	6–0, 6–0
