= 2016 Davis Cup Europe/Africa Zone Group I =

International tennis competition

The Europe/Africa Zone was one of the three zones of the regional Davis Cup competition in 2016.

In the Europe/Africa Zone there were three different tiers, called groups, in which teams competed against each other to advance to the upper tier. Winners in Group I advanced to the World Group play-offs, along with losing teams from the World Group first round. Teams who lost their respective ties competed in the relegation play-offs, with winning teams remaining in Group I, whereas teams who lost their play-offs were relegated to the Europe/Africa Zone Group II in 2017.

== Participating nations ==
Seeds:

1. Spain
2. Slovakia
3. Netherlands
4. Ukraine

Remaining nations:

- Austria
- Hungary
- Israel
- Portugal
- Romania
- Russia
- Slovenia
- Sweden

=== Draw ===
Second Round Play-offs
Viana do Castelo, Portugal (clay)
Slovenia	0
Portugal	5
Ramat HaSharon, Israel (hard)
Sweden	1
Israel	3

First Round Play-offs
bye
Slovenia
bye
Portugal
Båstad, Sweden (clay)
Sweden	0
3	Netherlands	5
Israel
bye

First Round
1	Spain
bye
Arad, Romania (indoor hard)
Romania	4
Slovenia	1
4	Ukraine
bye
Guimarães, Portugal (indoor hard)
Portugal	1
Austria	4
Kazan, Russia (indoor hard)
Russia	5
Sweden	0
bye
3	Netherlands
Budapest, Hungary (indoor clay)
Hungary	3
Israel	2
bye
2	Slovakia

Second Round
Cluj-Napoca, Romania (indoor hard)
1	Spain	4
Romania	1
Kyiv, Ukraine (hard)
4	Ukraine	3
Austria	2
Moscow, Russia (hard)
Russia	4
3	Netherlands	1
Budapest, Hungary (clay)
Hungary	0
2	Slovakia	3

- Slovenia and Sweden relegated to Group II in 20.
- Spain, Ukraine, Russia, and Slovakia advance to World Group Play-off.

== First round ==
=== Romania vs. Slovenia ===
Romania
4
Sala Sporturilor, Arad, Romania
4–6 March
Hard (i)

Slovenia
1

			1	2	3	4	5
1	(Romania) (Slovenia)	Marius Copil; Blaž Rola	7; 5	6; 3	7^{7} 6^{5}
2	(Romania) (Slovenia)	Adrian Ungur; Grega Žemlja	4; 6	4; 6	6; 3	7^{7} 6^{3}	6; 4
3	(Romania) (Slovenia)	Florin Mergea / Horia Tecău; Blaž Rola / Grega Žemlja	6; 3	7^{7} 6^{5}	7^{7} 6^{3}
4	(Romania) (Slovenia)	Adrian Ungur; Blaž Rola	3; 6	4; 6
5	(Romania) (Slovenia)	Marius Copil; Tomislav Ternar	6; 3	6; 3

=== Portugal vs. Austria ===
Portugal
1
Pavilhão Vitória Sport Clube, Guimarães, Portugal
4–6 March
Hard (i)

Austria
4

			1	2	3	4	5
1	(Portugal) (Austria)	João Sousa; Gerald Melzer	6; 1	7; 5	6; 2
2	(Portugal) (Austria)	Gastão Elias; Dominic Thiem	6; 3	5; 7	3; 6	6; 1	6^{6} 7^{8}
3	(Portugal) (Austria)	Gastão Elias / João Sousa; Alexander Peya / Dominic Thiem	7^{8} 6^{6}	7^{7} 6^{4}	1; 6	3; 6	4; 6
4	(Portugal) (Austria)	João Sousa; Dominic Thiem	2; 6	4; 6	2; 6
5	(Portugal) (Austria)	Pedro Sousa; Dennis Novak	4; 6	3; 6

=== Russia vs. Sweden ===
Russia
5
Kazan Tennis Academy, Kazan, Russia
4–6 March
Hard (i)

Sweden
0

			1	2	3	4	5
1	(Russia) (Sweden)	Andrey Kuznetsov; Isak Arvidsson	4; 6	6; 1	6; 1	6; 4
2	(Russia) (Sweden)	Teymuraz Gabashvili; Daniel Windahl	6; 3	6; 1	6; 1
3	(Russia) (Sweden)	Evgeny Donskoy / Konstantin Kravchuk; Johan Brunström / Robert Lindstedt	6; 3	7^{7} 6^{5}	6; 3
4	(Russia) (Sweden)	Teymuraz Gabashvili; Isak Arvidsson	6; 4	6; 0
5	(Russia) (Sweden)	Konstantin Kravchuk; Daniel Windahl	6; 2	6; 2

=== Hungary vs. Israel ===
Hungary
3
Heroes' Square, Budapest, Hungary
4–6 March
Clay (i)

Israel
2

			1	2	3	4	5
1	(Hungary) (Israel)	Péter Nagy; Dudi Sela	6; 2	6; 3	4; 6	4; 6	6; 1
2	(Hungary) (Israel)	Márton Fucsovics; Amir Weintraub	6; 4	6; 2	7; 5
3	(Hungary) (Israel)	Márton Fucsovics / Levente Gödry; Dudi Sela / Jonathan Erlich	7^{7} 6^{2}	3; 6	7^{7} 6^{5}	7^{9} 6^{7}
4	(Hungary) (Israel)	Gábor Borsos; Edan Leshem	6; 4	4; 6	6^{3} 7^{7}
5	(Hungary) (Israel)	Péter Nagy; Amir Weintraub	7; 5	4; 6	2; 6

== Second round ==
=== Romania vs. Spain ===
Romania
1
Polyvalent Hall, Cluj-Napoca, Romania
15–17 July
Hard (i)

Spain
4

			1	2	3	4	5
1	(Romania) (Spain)	Marius Copil; Feliciano López	6^{4} 7^{7}	7; 5	4; 6	6; 3	3; 6
2	(Romania) (Spain)	Adrian Ungur; Roberto Bautista Agut	3; 6	2; 6	1; 6
3	(Romania) (Spain)	Florin Mergea / Horia Tecău; Feliciano López / Marc López	3; 6	6; 1	1; 6	7; 5	6; 3
4	(Romania) (Spain)	Florin Mergea; Roberto Bautista Agut	4; 6	3; 6	2; 6
5	(Romania) (Spain)	Adrian Ungur; Pablo Carreño Busta	3; 6	6^{5} 7^{7}

=== Ukraine vs. Austria ===
Ukraine
3
Campa Tennis Club, Kyiv, Ukraine
15–17 July
Hard

Austria
2

			1	2	3	4	5
1	(Ukraine) (Austria)	Illya Marchenko; Dennis Novak	7^{7} 6^{3}	5; 7	6; 3	6; 2
2	(Ukraine) (Austria)	Sergiy Stakhovsky; Gerald Melzer	6; 3	6; 4	6; 3
3	(Ukraine) (Austria)	Denys Molchanov / Artem Smirnov; Jürgen Melzer / Philipp Oswald	3; 6	6^{7} 7^{9}	3; 6
4	(Ukraine) (Austria)	Illya Marchenko; Jürgen Melzer	6; 3	3; 6	6; 3	5; 7	3; 6
5	(Ukraine) (Austria)	Sergiy Stakhovsky; Dennis Novak	6; 3	6; 3	6^{8} 7^{10}	7; 5

=== Russia vs. Netherlands ===
Russia
4
National Tennis Centre, Moscow, Russia
15–17 July
Hard

Netherlands
1

			1	2	3	4	5
1	(Russia) (Netherlands)	Andrey Rublev; Robin Haase	7^{7} 6^{2}	6; 3	6; 4
2	(Russia) (Netherlands)	Teymuraz Gabashvili; Thiemo de Bakker	6^{3} 7^{7}	7^{7} 6^{4}	6; 4	6; 4
3	(Russia) (Netherlands)	Andrey Rublev / Konstantin Kravchuk; Robin Haase / Matwé Middelkoop	6; 3	6; 4	7; 5
4	(Russia) (Netherlands)	Konstantin Kravchuk; Robin Haase	6; 4	7^{7} 6^{5}
5	(Russia) (Netherlands)	Aslan Karatsev; Matwé Middelkoop	6; 4	1; 6	4; 6

=== Hungary vs. Slovakia ===
Hungary
0
Europe Tennis Center, Budapest, Hungary
15–17 July
Clay

Slovakia
3

			1	2	3	4	5
1	(Hungary) (Slovakia)	Péter Nagy; Andrej Martin	4; 6	2; 6	4; 6
2	(Hungary) (Slovakia)	Márton Fucsovics; Jozef Kovalík	7^{7} 6^{5}	4; 6	6^{5} 7^{7}	1; 6
3	(Hungary) (Slovakia)	Márton Fucsovics / Levente Gödry; Andrej Martin / Igor Zelenay	2; 6	2; 6	3; 6
4	(Hungary) (Slovakia)	Márton Fucsovics; Andrej Martin						not played
5	(Hungary) (Slovakia)	Péter Nagy; Jozef Kovalík						not played

== First round play-offs ==
=== Sweden vs. Netherlands ===
Sweden
0
Båstad Tennis Stadium, Båstad, Sweden
16–18 September
Clay

Netherlands
5

			1	2	3	4	5
1	(Sweden) (Netherlands)	Elias Ymer; Thiemo de Bakker	4; 6	4; 6	6; 1	6; 4	6^{2} 7^{7}
2	(Sweden) (Netherlands)	Mikael Ymer; Robin Haase	3; 6	3; 6	6^{10} 7^{12}
3	(Sweden) (Netherlands)	Isak Arvidsson / Fred Simonsson; Robin Haase / Jean-Julien Rojer	5; 7	2; 6	3; 6
4	(Sweden) (Netherlands)	Isak Arvidsson; Robin Haase	2; 6	4; 6
5	(Sweden) (Netherlands)	Mikael Ymer; Tim van Rijthoven	7^{7} 6^{1}	6^{6} 7^{8}	2; 6

== Second round play-offs ==
=== Portugal vs. Slovenia ===
Portugal
5
Clube de Tenis de Viana, Viana do Castelo, Portugal
16–18 September
Clay

Slovenia
0

			1	2	3	4	5
1	(Portugal) (Slovenia)	João Sousa; Tom Kočevar-Desman	6^{5} 7^{7}	7^{7} 6^{3}	6; 2	6; 1
2	(Portugal) (Slovenia)	Gastão Elias; Grega Žemlja	6; 4	7^{7} 6^{1}	6; 4
3	(Portugal) (Slovenia)	Gastão Elias / João Sousa; Tom Kočevar-Desman / Grega Žemlja	6; 4	6; 4	6; 4
4	(Portugal) (Slovenia)	Pedro Sousa; Tomislav Ternar	6; 0	6; 4
5	(Portugal) (Slovenia)	João Domingues; Tom Kočevar-Desman	6; 4	6; 3

=== Israel vs. Sweden ===
Israel
3
Canada Stadium, Ramat HaSharon, Israel
28–30 October
Hard

Sweden
1

			1	2	3	4	5
1	(Israel) (Sweden)	Amir Weintraub; Elias Ymer	6; 2	6; 3	6; 0
2	(Israel) (Sweden)	Dudi Sela; Markus Eriksson	6; 4	6; 2	6; 3
3	(Israel) (Sweden)	Jonathan Erlich / Dudi Sela; Isak Arvidsson / Johan Brunström	6; 4	7^{7} 6^{5}	4; 6	6; 1
4	(Israel) (Sweden)	Edan Leshem; Isak Arvidsson	7; 5	3; 6	2; 6
5	(Israel) (Sweden)	Amir Weintraub; Markus Eriksson						not played
