= Tihomir Grozdanov =

Bulgarian tennis player

Tihomir Grozdanov Тихомир Грозданов
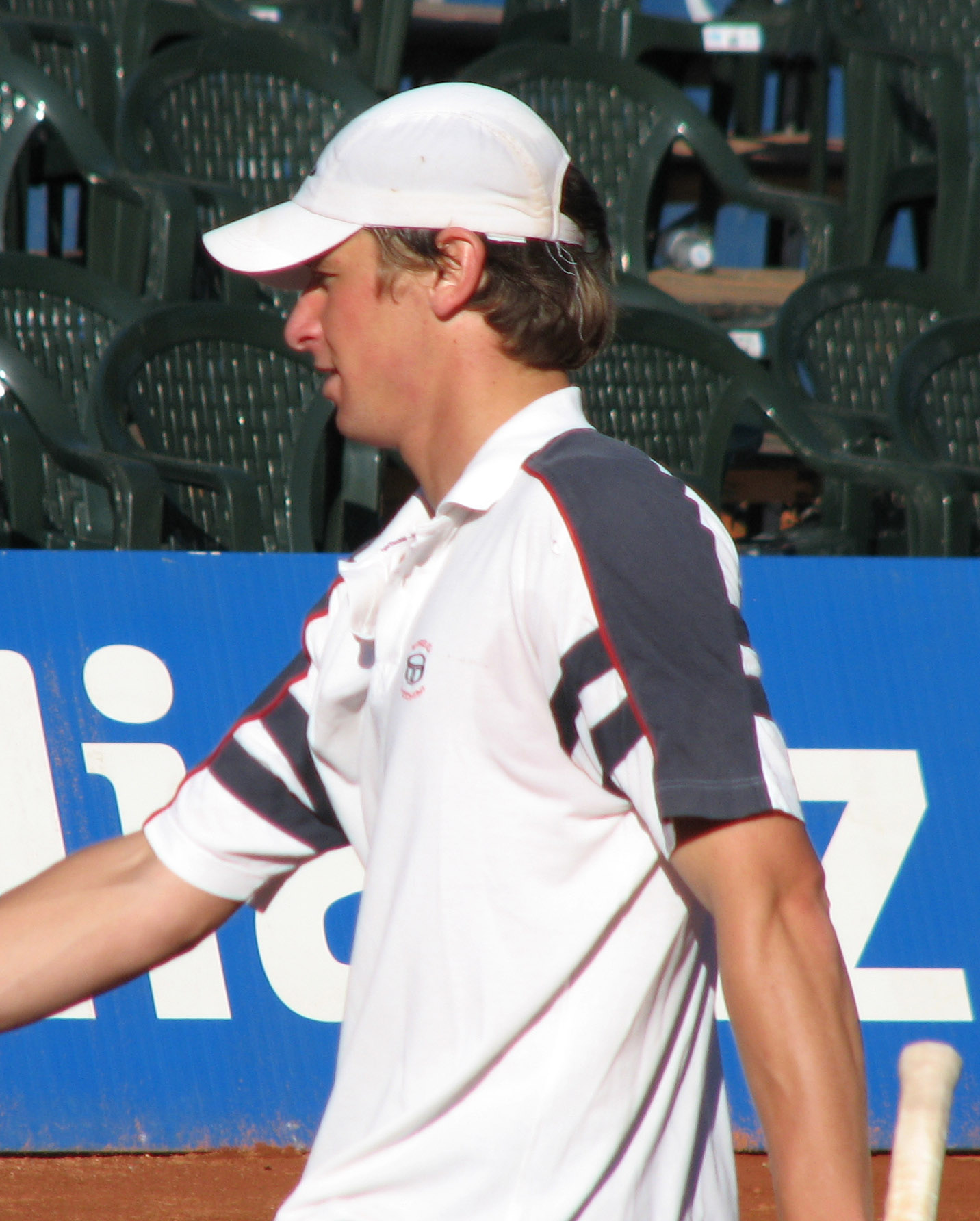
- Country (sports): Bulgaria
- Residence: Varna, Bulgaria
- Born: 29 April 1987 (age 39) Varna, Bulgaria
- Turned pro: 2005
- Retired: 2017 (last match)
- Plays: Right-handed
- Prize money: US$ 53,942

Singles
- Career record: 4–2 (at ATP Tour level, Grand Slam level, and in Davis Cup)
- Career titles: 0; 0 Challengers, 4 Futures
- Highest ranking: No. 394 (30 December 2013)

Doubles
- Career record: 3–1 (at ATP Tour level, Grand Slam level, and in Davis Cup)
- Career titles: 0; 0 Challengers, 10 Futures
- Highest ranking: No. 545 (17 January 2011)
- Last updated on: 30 January 2021.

Tihomir Ruslanov Grozdanov (Bulgarian: Тихомир Русланов Грозданов, born 29 April 1987) is a former professional Bulgarian tennis player. On 30 December 2013, he reached his highest ATP singles ranking of 394 whilst his best doubles ranking was 545 on 17 January 2011.

== Year-end rankings ==
Year	2005	2006	2007	2008	2009	2010	2011	2012	2013	2014	2015	2016	2017
Singles	1345	1152	974	621	641	561	595	755	394	897	1606	1287	1606
Doubles	950	1257	978	759	1055	551	948	1060	873	913	1018	-	-

== Challenger and Futures Finals ==
=== Singles: 10 (4–6) ===
Legend (singles) ATP Challenger Tour (0–0) ITF Futures (4–6)	Titles by surface Hard (1–0) Clay (3–6) Grass (0–0) Carpet (0–0)

Result	W–L	Date	Tournament	Tier	Surface	Opponent	Score
Loss	0–1	Jun 2008	Bulgaria F4, Sofia	Futures	Clay	(Belgium) Yannick Mertens	1–6, 3–6
Win	1–1	Sep 2008	Bulgaria F8, Stara Zagora	Futures	Clay	(Bulgaria) Ivaylo Traykov	7–5, 1–0 ret.
Loss	1–2	May 2009	Bulgaria F1, Sandanski	Futures	Clay	(Bulgaria) Ivaylo Traykov	6–2, 4–6, 3–6
Win	2–2	May 2010	Bulgaria F3, Plovdiv	Futures	Clay	(Spain) Javier Martí	6–4, 6–3
Loss	2–3	May 2011	Bulgaria F1, Varna	Futures	Clay	(France) Axel Michon	7–6^{(7–5)}, 3–6, 1–6
Loss	2–4	Sep 2012	Serbia F13, Niš	Futures	Clay	(Serbia) Miljan Zekić	7–5, 1–6, 1–6
Loss	2–5	Mar 2013	Croatia F4, Poreč	Futures	Clay	(Czech Republic) Jaroslav Pospíšil	2–6, 1–6
Win	3–5	Jun 2013	Bulgaria F4, Burgas	Futures	Clay	(France) Mathias Bourgue	6–4, 3–6, 6–2
Win	4–5	Dec 2013	Qatar F4, Doha	Futures	Hard	(United States) Michael Shabaz	7–6^{(10–8)}, 6–3
Loss	4–6	Jul 2014	Bulgaria F4, Plovdiv	Futures	Clay	(Chile) Guillermo Rivera-Aránguiz	7–5, 3–6, 1–6

=== Doubles: 18 (10–8) ===
Legend (doubles) ATP Challenger Tour (0–0) ITF Futures (10–8)	Titles by surface Hard (0–2) Clay (10–6) Grass (0–0) Carpet (0–0)

Result	W–L	Date	Tournament	Tier	Surface	Partner	Opponents	Score
Loss	0–1	Sep 2006	Bulgaria F3, Sofia	Futures	Clay	(Bulgaria) Todor Enev	(Bulgaria) Yordan Kanev (Bulgaria) Ilia Kushev	6–7^{(4–7)}, 4–6
Loss	0–2	Aug 2007	Bulgaria F5, Varna	Futures	Clay	(Bulgaria) Valentin Dimov	(Romania) Bogdan Leonte (Germany) Peter Torebko	6–7^{(4–7)}, 4–6
Loss	0–3	Oct 2007	Tunisia F5, Monastir	Futures	Hard	(Bulgaria) Simeon Ivanov	(France) Jonathan Eysseric (France) Jérôme Inzerillo	4–6, 1–6
Win	1–3	Jun 2008	Bulgaria F4, Sofia	Futures	Clay	(Bulgaria) Simeon Ivanov	(Bulgaria) Todor Enev (Bulgaria) Ilia Kushev	6–3, 4–6, [10–4]
Win	2–3	Jun 2008	Romania F8, Bucharest	Futures	Clay	(Bulgaria) Todor Enev	(Romania) Alexandru-Daniel Carpen (Romania) Costin Pavăl	6–1, 6–2
Win	3–3	Aug 2008	Bulgaria F5, Dobrich	Futures	Clay	(Bulgaria) Simeon Ivanov	(Bulgaria) Todor Enev (Bulgaria) Valentin Dimov	2–6, 7–5, [10–6]
Win	4–3	Nov 2009	Turkey F12, Antalya	Futures	Clay	(Bulgaria) Dinko Halachev	(Austria) Werner Eschauer (Germany) Alexander Flock	4–6, 6–2, [10–7]
Win	5–3	Mar 2010	Turkey F3, Antalya	Futures	Clay	(Bulgaria) Ivaylo Traykov	(Australia) Colin Ebelthite (Australia) Jarryd Maher	3–6, 6–4, [10–3]
Loss	5–4	May 2010	Bulgaria F2, Varna	Futures	Clay	(Bulgaria) Ivaylo Traykov	(Romania) Alexandru-Daniel Carpen (Romania) Adrian Cruciat	4–6, 4–6
Win	6–4	May 2010	Bulgaria F3, Plovdiv	Futures	Clay	(Bulgaria) Ivaylo Traykov	(Ukraine) Ivan Anikanov (Moldova) Roman Tudoreanu	6–4, 6–3
Win	7–4	Nov 2010	Turkey F14, Antalya	Futures	Clay	(Bulgaria) Alexander Lazov	(Belgium) Marco Dierckx (Belgium) Bart Govaerts	6–4, 4–6, [11–9]
Loss	7–5	Nov 2010	Turkey F15, Antalya	Futures	Clay	(Bulgaria) Alexander Lazov	(Serbia) Ivan Bjelica (Sweden) Patrik Brydolf	7–6^{(7–1)}, 4–6, [8–10]
Loss	7–6	Mar 2011	Turkey F9, Antalya	Futures	Clay	(Serbia) Ivan Bjelica	(Croatia) Toni Androić (Croatia) Dino Marcan	6–3, 2–6, [7–10]
Win	8–6	Mar 2012	Turkey F10, Antalya	Futures	Clay	(Bulgaria) Dimitar Kuzmanov	(Serbia) Ivan Bjelica (Serbia) Arsenije Zlatanović	6–3, 6–3
Loss	8–7	Dec 2012	Turkey F50, Istanbul	Futures	Hard (i)	(Bulgaria) Dinko Halachev	(Russia) Alexandre Krasnoroutskiy (Russia) Anton Manegin	6–7^{(2–7)}, 3–6
Loss	8–8	Mar 2014	Croatia F4, Poreč	Futures	Clay	(Croatia) Duje Kekez	(Spain) Gerard Granollers (Spain) Oriol Roca Batalla	4–6, 1–6
Win	9–8	Jun 2014	Bulgaria F1, Burgas	Futures	Clay	(Bulgaria) Plamen Milushev	(Italy) Riccardo Bonadio (Italy) Davide Melchiorre	6–2, 6–1
Win	10–8	Jun 2015	Bulgaria F2, Burgas	Futures	Clay	(Bulgaria) Alexander Lazov	(Bulgaria) Gabriel Donev (Greece) Eleftherios Theodorou	7–5, 4–6, [10–7]

== Davis Cup ==
Tihomir Grozdanov debuted for the Bulgaria Davis Cup team in 2008. Since then he has 11 nominations with 13 ties played, his singles W/L record is 4–2 and doubles W/L record is 9–1 (13–3 overall).

=== Singles (4–2) ===
Edition	Round	Date	Surface	Opponent	W/L	Result
2009 Europe/Africa Zone Group II	R1	8 March 2009	Carpet (I)	(Hungary) Ádám Kellner	L	6–4, 2–6, 6–7^{(3–7)}
2009 Europe/Africa Zone Group II	QF	10 July 2009	Clay	(Latvia) Andis Juška	L	7–6^{(7–5)}, 2–6, 3–6, 4–6
2009 Europe/Africa Zone Group II	QF	12 July 2009	Clay	(Latvia) Adrians Žguns	W	6–4, 6–3
2013 Europe/Africa Zone Group II	RPO	5 April 2013	Clay	(Estonia) Vladimir Ivanov	W	6–4, 6–1, 6–3
2014 Europe/Africa Zone Group II	R1	2 February 2014	Hard (I)	(Finland) Herkko Pöllänen	W	6–7^{(3–7)}, 6–2, 6–3
2015 Europe/Africa Zone Group II	QF	19 July 2015	Clay	(Luxembourg) Alex Knaff	W	6–3, 5–7, 6–4

=== Doubles (7–1) ===
Edition	Round	Date	Partner	Surface	Opponents	W/L	Result
2008 Europe/Africa Zone Group III	RR	8 April 2008	(Bulgaria) Simeon Ivanov	Clay	(Montenegro) Daniel Danilović (Montenegro) Nemanja Kontić	W	7–6^{(7–2)}, 6–4
2008 Europe/Africa Zone Group III	RR	9 April 2008	(Bulgaria) Simeon Ivanov	Clay	(Ivory Coast) Charles Irie (Ivory Coast) Claude N'Goran	W	4–6, 6–2, 6–0
2008 Europe/Africa Zone Group III	RR	11 April 2008	(Bulgaria) Simeon Ivanov	Clay	(Turkey) Haluk Akkoyun (Turkey) Ergün Zorlu	W	6–3, 7–6^{(7–5)}
2008 Europe/Africa Zone Group III	RR	12 April 2008	(Bulgaria) Simeon Ivanov	Clay	(Zimbabwe) Mark Fynn (Zimbabwe) Mlandeli Ndlela	W	6–4, 6–1
2013 Europe/Africa Zone Group II	RPO	6 April 2013	(Bulgaria) Alexander Lazov	Clay	(Estonia) Vladimir Ivanov (Estonia) Mikk Irdoja	W	4–6, 6–7^{(4–7)}, 7–6^{(7–2)}, 6–4, 6–3
2014 Europe/Africa Zone Group II	R1	1 February 2014	(Bulgaria) Dimitar Kutrovsky	Hard (I)	(Finland) Jarkko Nieminen (Finland) Henri Kontinen	L	3–6, 2–6, 6–3, 2–6
2015 Europe/Africa Zone Group II	R1	7 March 2015	(Bulgaria) Ilia Kushev	Hard (I)	(Latvia) Mārtiņš Podžus (Latvia) Jānis Podžus	W	3–6, 2–6, 6–4, 7–5, 6–1
2015 Europe/Africa Zone Group II	PPO	19 September 2015	(Bulgaria) Alexander Lazov	Clay	(Hungary) Márton Fucsovics (Hungary) Levente Gödry	W	2–6, 7–6^{(7–3)}, 6–4, 4–6, 6–1

- RR = Round Robin
- RPO = Relegation Play–off
- PPO = Promotion Play–off
