= Dávid Szintai =

Hungarian tennis player

- Country (sports): Hungary
- Born: 9 June 1997 (age 27)
- Plays: Right-handed
- Prize money: $12,225

Singles
- Career record: 0–1 (at ATP Tour level, Grand Slam level, and in Davis Cup)
- Career titles: 0
- Highest ranking: No. 1,052 (2 July 2018)
- Current ranking: No. 1,568 (25 November 2019)

Doubles
- Career record: 0–0 (at ATP Tour level, Grand Slam level, and in Davis Cup)
- Career titles: 1 ITF
- Highest ranking: No. 984 (1 May 2017)
- Current ranking: No. 1,831 (25 November 2019)
- Last updated on: 25 November 2019.

Dávid Szintai (born 9 June 1997) is a Hungarian tennis player.

Szintai has a career high ATP singles ranking of 1052 achieved on 2 July 2018. He also has a career high ATP doubles ranking of 984 achieved on 1 May 2017.

Szintai represents Hungary at the Davis Cup, where he has a W/L record of 0–1. He made his debut at the 2019 Davis Cup qualifying round in a dead rubber against Germany's Philipp Kohlschreiber in a losing effort.

== Future and Challenger finals ==
=== Doubles 2 (1–1) ===
| Legend (doubles) ATP Challenger Tour (0–0) ITF Futures Tour (1–1) | Titles by surface Hard (0–0) Clay (1–1) Grass (0–0) Carpet (0–0) |

| Result | W–L | Date | Tournament | Tier | Surface | Partner | Opponents | Score |
|---|---|---|---|---|---|---|---|---|
| Loss | 0–1 | May 2016 | Hungary F2, Szeged | Futures | Clay | (Hungary) Gergely Kisgyörgy | (Romania) Vasile Antonescu (Romania) Mircea-Alexandru Jecan | 3–6, 4–6 |
| Win | 1–1 | Aug 2016 | Serbia F5, Subotica | Futures | Clay | (Hungary) Levente Gödry | (Serbia) Goran Marković (Croatia) Antun Vidak | 6–3, 6–4 |

== Davis Cup ==
=== Participations: (0–1) ===
| Group membership World Group (0–0) Qualifying Round (0–1) WG Play-off (0–0) Group I (0–0) Group II (0–0) Group III (0–0) Group IV (0–0) | Matches by surface Hard (0–1) Clay (0–0) Grass (0–0) Carpet (0–0) | Matches by type Singles (0–1) Doubles (0–0) |

- ▲ ▼ indicates the outcome of the Davis Cup match followed by the score, date, place of event, the zonal classification and its phase, and the court surface.

| Rubber outcome | No. | Rubber | Match type (partner if any) | Opponent nation | Opponent player(s) | Score |
▼0–5; 1–2 February 2019; Fraport Arena, Frankfurt, Germany; Davis Cup qualifying round; hard (indoor) surface
| Defeat | 1 | V | Singles (dead rubber) | Germany | Philipp Kohlschreiber | 7–6^{(7–5)}, 3–6, [5–10] |
