= Alexandar Lazov =

Bulgarian tennis player

Alexandar Lazov Александър Лазов
- Country (sports): Bulgaria
- Born: 9 July 1990 (age 35) Pazardzhik, PR Bulgaria
- Height: 1.83 m (6 ft 0 in)
- Turned pro: 2006
- Retired: 2019 (last match)
- Plays: Left-handed (two-handed backhand)
- Prize money: US$ 112,161

Singles
- Career record: 1–7 (at ATP Tour level, Grand Slam level, and in Davis Cup)
- Career titles: 0
- Highest ranking: No. 324 (29 June 2015)

Doubles
- Career record: 4–3 (at ATP Tour level, Grand Slam level, and in Davis Cup)
- Career titles: 0
- Highest ranking: No. 314 (23 October 2017)
- Last updated on: 24 October 2022.

Alexandar Lazov (Bulgarian: Александър Лазов, born 9 July 1990) is a former professional Bulgarian tennis player. On 29 June 2015, he reached his highest ATP singles ranking of 324 whilst his best doubles ranking was 314 on 23 October 2017. In September 2012 he defeated Tihomir Grozdanov to become the 2012 Men's Bulgarian Champion.

== Year-end rankings ==
Year	2007	2008	2009	2010	2011	2012	2013	2014	2015	2016	2017	2018	2019	2020	2021
Singles	1479	1120	1180	1361	1246	506	601	367	442	426	399	483	1664	1723	1738
Doubles	-	-	1530	678	958	938	630	609	392	470	358	-	-	-	-

== Challenger and Futures Finals ==
=== Singles: 23 (10–13) ===
Legend (singles) ATP Challenger Tour (0–0) ITF Futures (10–13)	Titles by surface Hard (4–6) Clay (6–7) Grass (0–0) Carpet (0–0)

Result	W–L	Date	Tournament	Tier	Surface	Opponent	Score
Loss	0–1	Jul 2012	Turkey F28, İzmir	Futures	Clay	(France) Julien Demois	3–6, 7–6^{(17–15)}, 4–6
Win	1–1	Jul 2012	Turkey F29, İzmir	Futures	Clay	(Italy) Edoardo Eremin	1–6, 7–5, 7–6^{(7–5)}
Loss	1–2	Dec 2013	Cyprus F3, Larnaca	Futures	Hard	(Italy) Eric Crepaldi	3–6, 3–6
Win	2–2	Apr 2014	Kazakhstan F4, Shymkent	Futures	Clay	(Ukraine) Dmytro Badanov	6–3, 6–7^{(2–7)}, 6–2
Loss	2–3	Jun 2014	Bulgaria F3, Stara Zagora	Futures	Clay	(France) Mathias Bourgue	4–6, 3–6
Win	3–3	Aug 2014	Switzerland F3, Geneva	Futures	Clay	(Czech Republic) Michal Schmid	6–0, 6–1
Win	4–3	Aug 2014	Netherlands F5, Oldenzaal	Futures	Clay	(Netherlands) Niels Lootsma	5–7, 7–6^{(9–7)}, 6–4
Loss	4–4	Nov 2014	Cyprus F1, Nicosia	Futures	Hard	(Slovakia) Adrian Sikora	6–7^{(6–8)}, 1–6
Loss	4–5	Mar 2015	Tunisia F10, El Kantaoui	Futures	Hard	(Italy) Thomas Fabbiano	6–7^{(2–7)}, 6–4, 1–6
Loss	4–6	Mar 2015	Tunisia F11, El Kantaoui	Futures	Hard	(Italy) Thomas Fabbiano	3–6, 1–6
Win	5–6	May 2015	Romania F1, Galați	Futures	Clay	(Kazakhstan) Dmitry Popko	4–6, 7–5, 6–4
Loss	5–7	Jun 2015	Bulgaria F1, Stara Zagora	Futures	Clay	(Spain) Oriol Roca Batalla	6–3, 4–6, 2–6
Loss	5–8	May 2016	Romania F1, Galați	Futures	Clay	(Uruguay) Martín Cuevas	4–6, 3–6
Loss	5–9	May 2016	Bulgaria F1, Sozopol	Futures	Hard	(Spain) David Pérez Sanz	2–6, 3–6
Loss	5–10	Aug 2016	Germany F12, Überlingen	Futures	Clay	(Germany) Oscar Otte	7–6^{(7–4)}, 2–6, 4–6
Win	6–10	Nov 2016	Turkey F47, Antalya	Futures	Hard	(Italy) Adelchi Virgili	6–0, 6–4
Win	7–10	Dec 2016	Turkey F49, Antalya	Futures	Hard	(Croatia) Borna Gojo	7–6^{(8–6)}, 7–5
Win	8–10	Jan 2017	Turkey F2, Antalya	Futures	Hard	(Netherlands) Tallon Griekspoor	6–4, 2–6, 7–6^{(7–5)}
Loss	8–11	Feb 2017	Turkey F7, Antalya	Futures	Hard	(Turkey) Altuğ Çelikbilek	6–4, 6–7^{(5–7)}, 4–6
Loss	8–12	Aug 2017	Switzerland F3, Collonge-Bellerive	Futures	Clay	(Slovakia) Filip Horanský	2–6, 0–6
Loss	8–13	Nov 2017	Turkey F44, Antalya	Futures	Clay	(Czech Republic) Pavel Nejedlý	6–3, 2–6, 4–6
Win	9–13	Feb 2018	Turkey F6, Antalya	Futures	Hard	(Hungary) Attila Balázs	7–6^{(7–4)}, 6–3
Win	10–13	Aug 2018	Netherlands F4, Oldenzaal	Futures	Clay	(Netherlands) Niels Lootsma	3–3 ret.

=== Doubles: 29 (10–19) ===
Legend (doubles) ATP Challenger Tour (0–1) ITF Futures (10–18)	Titles by surface Hard (0–8) Clay (10–11) Grass (0–0) Carpet (0–0)

Result	W–L	Date	Tournament	Tier	Surface	Partner	Opponents	Score
Loss	0–1	Aug 2010	Bulgaria F4, Sofia	Futures	Clay	(Bulgaria) Boris Nicola Bakalov	(Germany) Pirmin Haenle (Spain) Óscar Sabate-Bretos	4–6, 6–3, [7–10]
Win	1–1	Nov 2010	Turkey F14, Antalya	Futures	Clay	(Bulgaria) Tihomir Grozdanov	(Belgium) Marco Dierckx (Belgium) Bart Govaerts	6–4, 4–6, [11–9]
Loss	1–2	Nov 2010	Turkey F15, Antalya	Futures	Clay	(Bulgaria) Tihomir Grozdanov	(Serbia) Ivan Bjelica (Sweden) Patrik Brydolf	7–6^{(7–1)}, 4–6, [8–10]
Loss	1–3	Nov 2011	Chines Taipei F3, Tainan	Futures	Clay	(Austria) Nikolaus Moser	(Chinese Taipei) Huang Liang-chi (Chinese Taipei) Yi Chu-huan	3–6, 4–6
Loss	1–4	Oct 2012	Algeria F1, Annaba	Futures	Clay	(Spain) Carlos Boluda-Purkiss	(Austria) Gerald Melzer (Austria) Lukas Jastraunig	2–6, 2–6
Win	2–4	May 2013	Bulgaria F2, Varna	Futures	Clay	(Chile) Laslo Urrutia Fuentes	(Bulgaria) Petar Trendafilov (Bulgaria) Dinko Halachev	4–6, 7–5, [10–8]
Win	3–4	Jul 2013	Bulgaria F7, Plovdiv	Futures	Clay	(Chile) Laslo Urrutia Fuentes	(Russia) Andrey Rublev (Belarus) Yaraslav Shyla	4–6, 6–3, [10–8]
Loss	3–5	Dec 2013	Cyprus F3, Larnaca	Futures	Hard	(Ukraine) Vladyslav Manafov	(Romania) Alexandru-Daniel Carpen (Poland) Grzegorz Panfil	6–2, 1–6, [8–10]
Loss	3–6	Jun 2014	Bulgaria F2, Stara Zagora	Futures	Clay	(Czech Republic) Jan Blecha	(Bosnia and Herzegovina) Nerman Fatić (North Macedonia) Tomislav Jotovski	5–7, 2–6
Loss	3–7	Oct 2014	Kazakhstan F13, Shymkent	Futures	Clay	(Georgia (country)) Aleksandre Metreveli	(Spain) Enrique López-Pérez (India) Jeevan Nedunchezhiyan	3–6, 3–6
Loss	3–8	Nov 2014	Dominican Republic F1, La Romana	Futures	Clay	(Finland) Henrik Sillanpää	(Brazil) Pedro Bernardi (United States) Connor Smith	6–7^{(5–7)}, 4–6
Loss	3–9	Dec 2014	Dominican Republic F4, Santo Domingo	Futures	Hard	(Peru) Mauricio Echazú	(United States) Sekou Bangoura (United States) Mitchell Krueger	7–6^{(7–1)}, 1–6, [8–10]
Loss	3–10	Feb 2015	Tunisia F3, El Kantaoui	Futures	Hard	(Russia) Daniil Medvedev	(Italy) Riccardo Ghedin (Italy) Claudio Grassi	6–4, 6–7^{(2–7)}, [4–10]
Loss	3–11	Feb 2015	Tunisia F4, El Kantaoui	Futures	Hard	(Russia) Daniil Medvedev	(Germany) Peter Heller (Austria) Dominic Weidinger	3–6, 3–6
Win	4–11	Jun 2015	Bulgaria F2, Burgas	Futures	Clay	(Bulgaria) Tihomir Grozdanov	(Bulgaria) Gabriel Donev (Greece) Eleftherios Theodorou	7–5, 4–6, [10–7]
Win	5–11	Jul 2015	Germany F7, Kassel	Futures	Clay	(Egypt) Karim Maamoun	(Netherlands) Sander Arends (Australia) Adam Hubble	6–2, 5–7, [10–8]
Win	6–11	Sep 2015	Serbia F13, Sokobanja	Futures	Clay	(North Macedonia) Tomislav Jotovski	(Germany) Bogdan Djurdjevic (Spain) Enric Guaita-Pais	4–6, 6–4, [10–6]
Loss	6–12	Oct 2015	Kazakhstan F5, Shymkent	Futures	Clay	(Russia) Markos Kalovelonis	(Russia) Ivan Gakhov (Georgia (country)) Aleksandre Metreveli	6–7^{(4–7)}, 3–6
Loss	6–13	Nov 2015	Greece F10, Heraklion	Futures	Hard	(Czech Republic) Dominik Süč	(Greece) Konstantinos Economidis (Greece) Stefanos Tsitsipas	2–6, 2–6
Win	7–13	Mar 2016	Turkey F11, Antalya	Futures	Clay	(Czech Republic) Michal Schmid	(France) Jérôme Inzerillo (France) François-Arthur Vibert	6–4, 6–1
Loss	7–14	Mar 2016	Turkey F12, Antalya	Futures	Hard	(Netherlands) Jesse Huta Galung	(Venezuela) Jordi Muñoz Abreu (Spain) David Pérez Sanz	0–6, 3–6
Loss	7–15	May 2016	Romania F1, Galați	Futures	Clay	(Romania) Victor-Mugurel Anagnastopol	(Romania) Andrei Ștefan Apostol (Romania) Nicolae Frunză	4–6, 4–6
Win	8–15	Jun 2016	Macedonia F1, Skopje	Futures	Clay	(North Macedonia) Tomislav Jotovski	(Serbia) Nebojša Perić (Serbia) Danilo Petrović	6–3, 6–2
Win	9–15	Jul 2016	Macedonia F2, Skopje	Futures	Clay	(North Macedonia) Tomislav Jotovski	(Czech Republic) Libor Salaba (Croatia) Nino Serdarušić	6–2, 3–6, [10–6]
Loss	9–16	Aug 2016	Germany F12, Überlingen	Futures	Clay	(Peru) Mauricio Echazú	(Germany) Oscar Otte (Germany) Tom Schönenberg	1–6, 0–6
Loss	9–17	Oct 2016	Turkey F43, Antalya	Futures	Hard	(Bulgaria) Dimitar Kuzmanov	(Ukraine) Vadim Ursu (Ukraine) Volodymyr Uzhylovskyi	0–6, 1–6
Loss	9–18	Dec 2016	Turkey F48, Antalya	Futures	Hard	(Ukraine) Marat Deviatiarov	(Turkey) Tuna Altuna (Turkey) Cem İlkel	4–6, 2–6
Loss	9–19	Sep 2017	Alphen aan den Rijn, Netherlands	Challenger	Clay	(Ukraine) Volodymyr Uzhylovskyi	(Netherlands) Botic van de Zandschulp (Netherlands) Boy Westerhof	6–7^{(6–8)}, 5–7
Win	10–19	Jun 2018	Italy F12, Reggio Emilia	Futures	Clay	(Turkey) Tuna Altuna	(Belgium) Zizou Bergs (France) Maxime Tabatruong	6–4, 6–2

== Davis Cup ==
Alexandar Lazov debuted for the Bulgaria Davis Cup team in 2013. Since then he has 9 nominations with 13 ties played, his singles W/L record is 5–8 and doubles W/L record is 3–1 (8–9 overall).

=== Singles (5–8) ===
Edition	Round	Date	Surface	Opponent	W/L	Result
2013 Europe/Africa Zone Group II	R1	1 February 2013	Hard (I)	(Finland) Micke Kontinen	L	6–7^{(4–7)}, 3–6, 4–6
2013 Europe/Africa Zone Group II	R1	3 February 2013	Hard (I)	(Finland) Harri Heliövaara	L	6–4, 6–7^{(4–7)}, 4–6, 3–6
2014 Europe/Africa Zone Group II	R1	31 January 2014	Hard (I)	(Finland) Jarkko Nieminen	L	3–6, 0–6, 3–6
2015 Europe/Africa Zone Group II	R1	6 March 2015	Hard (I)	(Latvia) Mārtiņš Podžus	L	3–6, 5–7, 5–7
2015 Europe/Africa Zone Group II	R1	8 March 2015	Hard (I)	(Latvia) Rudolfs Mednis	W	6–4, 6–1
2015 Europe/Africa Zone Group II	PPO	20 September 2015	Clay	(Hungary) Márton Fucsovics	L	3–6, 4–6, 2–6
2016 Europe/Africa Zone Group II	RPO	15 July 2016	Hard	(Tunisia) Aziz Dougaz	L	6–7^{(4–7)}, 4–6, 6–2, 5–7
2017 Europe Zone Group III	RR	6 April 2017	Hard	(Armenia) Mikayel Avetisyan	W	6–0, 6–0
2017 Europe Zone Group III	RR	7 April 2017	Hard	(Greece) Ioannis Stergiou	W	6–3, 6–4
2017 Europe Zone Group III	PPO	8 April 2017	Hard	(Republic of Ireland) James McGee	L	2–6, 6–4, 1–6
2018 Europe Zone Group III	RR	5 April 2018	Clay	(Iceland) Egill Sigurðsson	W	6–1, 6–1
2018 Europe Zone Group III	RR	6 April 2018	Clay	(North Macedonia) Gorazd Srbljak	W	6–1, 6–1
2018 Europe Zone Group III	PPO	7 April 2018	Clay	(Monaco) Romain Arneodo	L	4–6, 4–6

=== Doubles (3–1) ===
Edition	Round	Date	Partner	Surface	Opponents	W/L	Result
2013 Europe/Africa Zone Group II	RPO	6 April 2013	(Bulgaria) Tihomir Grozdanov	Clay	(Estonia) Vladimir Ivanov (Estonia) Mikk Irdoja	W	4–6, 6–7^{(4–7)}, 7–6^{(7–2)}, 6–4, 6–3
2015 Europe/Africa Zone Group II	PPO	19 September 2015	(Bulgaria) Tihomir Grozdanov	Clay	(Hungary) Márton Fucsovics (Hungary) Levente Gödry	W	2–6, 7–6^{(7–3)}, 6–4, 4–6, 6–1
2016 Europe/Africa Zone Group II	R1	5 March 2016	(Bulgaria) Vasko Mladenov	Hard (I)	(Turkey) Cem İlkel (Turkey) Tuna Altuna	W	7–6^{(8–6)}, 6–7^{(5–7)}, 6–7^{(4–7)}, 7–6^{(7–5)}, 6–4
2017 Europe Zone Group III	PRO	8 April 2017	(Bulgaria) Dimitar Kuzmanov	Hard	(Republic of Ireland) Sam Barry (Republic of Ireland) David O'Hare	L	1–6, 6–7^{(6–8)}

- RPO = Relegation Play–off
- PPO = Promotion Play–off
