= Ádám Kellner =

Hungarian tennis player

- Country (sports): Hungary
- Born: 1 August 1986 (age 40)
- Height: 1.87 m (6 ft 1 1/2 in)
- Retired: 2017 (last match)
- Plays: Right-handed (two-handed backhand)
- Prize money: $67,262

Singles
- Career record: 6–7
- Career titles: 0
- Highest ranking: No. 218 (29 August 2011)

Grand Slam singles results
- Wimbledon: Q1 (2011)
- US Open: Q1 (2011)

Doubles
- Career record: 1–0
- Career titles: 0
- Highest ranking: No. 451 (17 October 2016)
- Last updated on: 11 September 2017.

Ádám Kellner (born 1 August 1986) is a professional Hungarian tennis player.

Kellner reached his highest individual ranking on the ATP Tour on 29 August 2011, when he became World No. 218. He primarily plays on the Futures circuit and the Challenger circuit.

Kellner has been a member of the Hungary Davis Cup team between 2005 and 2012, posting a 6–7 record in singles in 10 ties.

== Tour singles titles – all levels (12) ==
Legend (singles)
Grand Slam (0)
Tennis Masters Cup (0)
ATP Masters Series (0)
ATP Tour (0)
Challengers (0)
Futures (12)

No.	Date	Tournament	Surface	Opponent in the final	Score
1.	3 August 2008	(Romania) Oradea	Clay	(Romania) Gabriel Moraru	6–4, 6–2
2.	28 March 2009	(India) Kolkata	Clay	(Monaco) Benjamin Balleret	6–2, 6–2
3.	24 May 2009	(Czech Republic) Jablonec nad Nisou	Clay	(Netherlands) Raemon Sluiter	7–6(7), 4–6, 6–3
4.	27 June 2009	(Italy) Castelfranco	Clay	(Belgium) David Goffin	6–4, 6–7(9), 6–3
5.	17 October 2009	(Thailand) Nakhon Ratchasima	Hard	(Finland) Harri Heliövaara	2–6, 7–6(5), 6–4
6.	29 August 2010	(Bulgaria) Burgas	Clay	(Sweden) Michael Ryderstedt	0–6, 7–6(4), 6–4
7.	24 October 2010	(Greece) Paros	Carpet	(Hungary) Kornél Bardóczky	3–2, RET.
8.	7 November 2010	(United States) Niceville	Clay	(Australia) James Lemke	6–3, 7–6(3)
9.	22 January 2011	(Israel) Eilat	Hard	(Czech Republic) Roman Vögeli	6–3, 6–2
10.	29 January 2011	(Israel) Eilat	Hard	(Serbia) Nikola Cacic	6–2, 7–5
11.	26 March 2011	(India) Kolkata	Clay	(Croatia) Roko Karanušić	6–3, 6–1
12.	3 July 2011	(Romania) Mediaș	Clay	(Romania) Victor Ioniță	3–6, 6–0, 7–6(3)

== Finals (8) ==
No.	Date	Tournament	Surface	Opponent in the final	Score
1.	6 October 2007	(Italy) Sassari	Clay	(Italy) Simone Vagnozzi	6–1, 1–6, 1–6
2.	25 November 2007	(Dominican Republic) Santo Domingo	Hard	(Dominican Republic) Víctor Estrella Burgos	4–6, 4–6
3.	17 August 2008	(Serbia) Sombor	Clay	(Serbia) Nikola Ćirić	5–7, 3–6
4.	21 March 2009	(India) Chandigarh	Hard	(South Korea) Lim Yong-kyu	3–6, 6–7(7)
5.	21 November 2010	(United States) Amelia Island	Clay	(Canada) Philip Bester	6–7(2), 4–6
6.	1 May 2011	(Czech Republic) Ostrava	Clay	(France) Stéphane Robert	1–6, 3–6
7.	3 March 2012	(Turkey) Antalya	Hard	(Moldova) Radu Albot	6–7(5), 2–6
8.	24 March 2012	(Israel) Herzliya	Hard	(United Kingdom) Andrew Fitzpatrick	7–6(3), 4–6, 4–6

== Tour doubles titles – all levels (9) ==
Legend (singles)
Grand Slam (0)
Tennis Masters Cup (0)
ATP Masters Series (0)
ATP Tour (0)
Challengers (0)
Futures (9)

No.	Date	Tournament	Surface	Partner	Opponents in the final	Score
1.	9 December 2007	Santo Domingo, Dominican Republic F3	Hard	(Hungary) Kornél Bardóczky	(France) Philippe de Bonnevie (Brazil) Rodrigo-Antonio Grilli	6–0, 6–3
2.	5 September 2010	Dobrich, Bulgaria F6	Clay	(Hungary) Levente Gödry	(Romania) Robert Coman (Romania) Petru-Alexandru Luncanu	6–4, 6–2
3.	24 October 2010	Paros, Greece F2	Carpet	(Hungary) Kornél Bardóczky	(Greece) Konstantinos Economidis (Greece) Alexandros Jakupovic	6–2, 6–4
4.	31 March 2012	Herzliya, Israel F6	Hard	(Hungary) Levente Gödry	(France) Antoine Benneteau (France) Axel Michon	6–3, 6–3
5.	23 October 2015	Ramat HaSharon, Israel F14	Hard	(Hungary) Gábor Borsos	(Israel) Harel Levy (Israel) Noam Okun	6–4, 7–6(7)
6.	6 May 2016	Szeged, Hungary F3	Clay	(Hungary) Gábor Borsos	(Romania) Victor Vlad Cornea (Czech Republic) Zdeněk Kolář	6–2, 6–1
7.	25 June 2016	Kaltenkirchen, Germany F4	Clay	(Hungary) Gábor Borsos	(Germany) Jonas Lütjen (Germany) Timon Reichelt	7–6(9), 6–4
8.	10 September 2016	Budapest, Hungary F4	Clay	(Hungary) Gábor Borsos	(Hungary) Levente Gödry (Hungary) Péter Nagy	6–4, 1–6, [10–6]
9.	7 October 2016	Balatonboglár, Hungary F8	Clay	(Hungary) Gábor Borsos	(Czech Republic) Zdeněk Kolář (Czech Republic) Pavel Nejedlý	3–6, 6–2, [10–8]
