= 2022 Davis Cup =

110th edition of the Davis Cup

Details
- Duration: 4 March – 27 November 2022
- Edition: 110th

Champion
- Winning nation: Canada (1st title)

Canada defeated Australia 2–0 in the final of the 2022 Davis Cup. It was the 110th edition of the Davis Cup, an international competition between teams in men's tennis, and was sponsored by Rakuten. The Russian Tennis Federation were the defending champions, but they and Belarus were disqualified from competing in international events due to the 2022 Russian invasion of Ukraine.

Bhutan, Burundi, DR Congo, Laos, Maldives, Nicaragua, and Tanzania made their first appearances in the tournament.

== Final knockout stage bracket ==
Quarterfinals
24 November, Málaga
Italy	2
United States	1
24 November, Málaga
Germany	1
Canada	2
22 November, Málaga
Netherlands	0
Australia	2
23 November, Málaga
Spain	0
Croatia	2

Semifinals
26 November, Málaga
Italy	1
Canada	2
25 November, Málaga
Australia	2
Croatia	1

Final
27 November, Málaga
Canada	2
Australia	0

== Davis Cup Finals ==
Date: 13–18 September 2022 (group stage)
23–27 November 2022 (knockout stage)
Venue: Unipol Arena, Bologna, Italy
Emirates Arena, Glasgow, Great Britain
Am Rothenbaum, Hamburg, Germany
Pavelló Municipal Font de Sant Lluís, Valencia, Spain
Martin Carpena Arena, Malaga, Spain
Surface: Indoor Hard

16 nations took part in the finals. The qualification was as follows:

- 1 finalists of the previous edition (defending champion Russia was suspended)
- 1 highest-ranked losing semi-finalist of the previous edition (announced by ITF on 13 March 2022 as Serbia to replace Russia)
- 2 wild card teams (announced by ITF on 5 December 2021 as Serbia and Great Britain, Canada were later given Serbia’s subsequently vacant wildcard
- 12 winners of a qualifier round, in March 2022

H = Host nation, TH = Title holder, 2021F = Finalist from the 2021 tournament, 2021SF = Highest-ranked losing semi-finalist from the 2021 tournament, WC = Wild card

Participating teams
Argentina	Australia	Belgium	Canada (WC)
Croatia (2021F)	France	Germany	Great Britain (WC)
Italy	Kazakhstan	Netherlands	Serbia (2021SF)
South Korea	Spain	Sweden	United States

=== Seeds ===
The seedings were based on the Davis Cup Ranking of 7 March 2022.

1. Croatia
2. Spain
3. France
4. United States
5. Germany
6. Canada
7. Italy
8. Great Britain
9. Kazakhstan
10. Belgium
11. Serbia
12. Argentina
13. Sweden
14. Australia
15. Netherlands
16. South Korea

=== Qualifying round ===
Date: 4–5 March 2022

Twenty-six eligible teams were:

- 16 teams ranked 3rd-18th in the Finals.
- 8 winning teams from World Group I.
- 2 winning teams from World Group I Knock-out ties.

Two wild cards for the Finals were selected from these 26 nations. Serbia and Great Britain were announced prior to the Qualifiers draw. The remaining 24 nations competed for 12 spots in the Finals.

The 12 winning teams from the play-offs played at the Finals and the 12 losing teams played at the World Group I.

Qualified teams

- France (#1)
- Spain (#3)
- Belgium (#4)
- United States (#5)
- Canada (#6)
- Germany (#8)
- Italy (#9)
- Australia (#11)
- Kazakhstan (#12)
- Sweden (#14)
- Argentina (#15)
- Austria (#16)

- Japan (#17)
- Czech Republic (#18)
- Colombia (#19)
- Netherlands (#20)
- Hungary (#23)
- Ecuador (#24)
- Brazil (#26)
- South Korea (#27)
- Slovakia (#29)
- Finland (#32)
- Romania (#41)
- Norway (#44)

Home team	Score	Away team	Location	Venue	Surface
France [1]	4–0	Ecuador	Pau	Palais des Sports	Hard (i)
Spain [2]	3–1	Romania	Marbella	Club de Tenis Puente Romano	Clay
Finland	2–3	Belgium [3]	Espoo	Espoo Metro Areena	Hard (i)
United States [4]	4–0	Colombia	Reno	Reno Events Center	Hard (i)
Netherlands	4–0	Canada [5]	The Hague	Sportcampus Zuiderpark	Clay (i)
Brazil	1–3	Germany [6]	Rio de Janeiro	Olympic Tennis Centre	Clay
Slovakia	2–3	Italy [7]	Bratislava	AXA Aréna NTC	Hard (i)
Australia [8]	3–2	Hungary	Sydney	Ken Rosewall Arena	Hard
Norway	1–3	Kazakhstan [9]	Oslo	Oslo Tennis Arena	Hard (i)
Sweden [10]	3–2	Japan	Helsingborg	Helsingborg Arena	Hard (i)
Argentina [11]	4–0	Czech Republic	Buenos Aires	Lawn Tennis Club	Clay
South Korea	3–1	Austria [12]	Seoul	Olympic Park Tennis Center	Hard (i)

=== Group stage ===
Qualified for the Knockout stage
Eliminated

G = Group, T = Ties, M = Matches, S = Sets, H = Hosts

G	Winner			Runner-up			Third			Fourth		
G	Nation	T	M	Nation	T	M	Nation	T	M	Nation	T	M
A	Italy (H)	3–0	7–2	Croatia	2–1	5–4	Sweden	1–2	4–5	Argentina	0–3	2–7
B	Spain (H)	2–1	7–2	Canada	2–1	5–4	Serbia	2–1	4–5	South Korea	0–3	2–7
C	Germany (H)	3–0	6–3	Australia	2–1	6–3	France	1–2	4–5	Belgium	0–3	2–7
D	Netherlands	3–0	6–3	United States	2–1	5–4	Great Britain (H)	1–2	4–5	Kazakhstan	0–3	3–6

== World Group I ==
Date: 15–18 September 2022

Twenty-four teams participated in the World Group I, in series decided on a home and away basis.

These twenty-four teams were:

- 11 losing teams from Qualifying round, in March 2022
- 12 winning teams from World Group I play-offs, in March 2022
- 1 highest-ranked losing team from World Group I play-offs (Uzbekistan)

#: Nations ranking as of 7 March 2022.

Seeded teams

- Austria (#16)
- Colombia (#17)
- Czech Republic (#18)
- Japan (#19)
- Ecuador (#22)
- Chile (#23)
- Brazil (#24)
- India (#25)
- Hungary (#26)
- Slovakia (#27)
- Finland (#28)
- Bosnia and Herzegovina (#29)

Unseeded teams

- Romania (#30)
- Uzbekistan (#31)
- Norway (#32)
- Israel (#33)
- Peru (#34)
- Portugal (#35)
- Mexico (#36)
- Ukraine (#37)
- Turkey (#38)
- Pakistan (#39)
- New Zealand (#40)
- Switzerland (#45)

Home team	Score	Away team	Location	Venue	Surface
Austria [1]	4–0	Pakistan	Tulln an der Donau	Tennis Club Tulln	Clay
Colombia [2]	4–0	Turkey	Bogotá	Carmel Club	Clay
Israel	1–3	Czech Republic [3]	Tel Aviv	Shlomo Group Arena	Hard (i)
Uzbekistan	3–1	Japan [4]	Tashkent	Olympic Tennis School	Hard
Ecuador [5]	2–3	Switzerland	Salinas	Salinas Golf & Tenis Club	Hard
Peru	2–3	Chile [6]	Lima	Club Lawn Tennis de La Exposición	Clay
Portugal	3–1	Brazil [7]	Viana do Castelo	Centro Cultural de Viana do Castelo	Hard (i)
Norway	3–1	India [8]	Lillehammer	Håkons Hall	Hard (i)
Ukraine	1–3	Hungary [9]	Vilnius, Lithuania	SEB Arena	Hard (i)
Slovakia [10]	3–1	Romania	Bratislava	NTC Arena	Clay (i)
Finland [11]	5–0	New Zealand	Espoo	Espoo Metro Areena	Hard (i)
Bosnia and Herzegovina [12]	3–1	Mexico	Široki Brijeg	Tennis Academy SET	Clay

=== Qualifying round ===
Date: 4–5 March 2022

Twenty-four teams played for twelve spots in the World Group I, in series decided on a home and away basis.

These twenty-four teams were:

- 2 losing teams from World Group I Knock-out ties.
- 12 losing teams from World Group I.
- 8 winning teams from World Group II.
- 2 winning teams from World Group II Knock-out ties.

The 12 winning teams from the play-offs played at the World Group I and the 12 losing teams played at the World Group II.

#: Nations ranking as of 20 September 2021.

Qualified teams

- Chile (#21)
- India (#22)
- Uzbekistan (#25)
- Portugal (#28)
- Bosnia and Herzegovina (#29)
- Israel (#31)
- Uruguay (#33)
- Ukraine (#34)
- Pakistan (#35)
- Peru (#36)
- Lebanon (#37)
- Mexico (#38)

- Lithuania (#39)
- New Zealand (#40)
- Bolivia (#43)
- Switzerland (#45)
- Belarus (#46)
- Poland (#47)
- Slovenia (#49)
- Turkey (#51)
- South Africa (#52)
- Barbados (#54)
- Tunisia (#56)
- Denmark (#57)

Home team	Score	Away team	Location	Venue	Surface
Chile [1]	4–0	Slovenia	Viña del Mar	Club Union de Tenis	Clay
India [2]	4–0	Denmark	New Delhi	Delhi Gymkhana Club	Grass
Uzbekistan [3]	2–3	Turkey	Tashkent	Olympic Tennis School	Hard (i)
Portugal [4]	4–0	Poland	Porto	Complexo Municipal de Ténis da Maia	Clay (i)
Tunisia	1–3	Bosnia and Herzegovina [5]	Tunis	Tennis Club de Tunis	Clay
Israel [6]	3–1	South Africa	Ashdod	HaKiriya Arena	Hard (i)
New Zealand	3–1	Uruguay [7]	Las Vegas (United States)	Darling Tennis Center	Hard
Ukraine [8]	3–0	Barbados	Antalya (Turkey)	Rixos Premium Belek	Hard
Pakistan [9]	3–2	Lithuania	Islamabad	Pakistan Sports Complex	Grass
Peru [10]	3–1	Bolivia	Lima	Club Lawn Tennis de La Exposición	Clay
Switzerland	3–1	Lebanon [11]	Biel/Bienne	Jan Group Arena	Hard (i)
Mexico [12]	w/o	Belarus	Mexico City	Estadio Rafael Osuna	Clay

== World Group II ==
Date: 16–18 September 2022

Twenty-four teams participated in the World Group II, in series decided on a home and away basis.

These twenty-four teams were:

- 10 losing teams from World Group I play-offs, in March 2022
- 12 winning teams from World Group II play-offs, in March 2022
- 2 highest-ranked losing teams from World Group II play-offs (China PR and Thailand)

#: Nations ranking as of 7 March 2022.

Seeded teams

- Uruguay (#41)
- Lebanon (#42)
- Lithuania (#43)
- Bolivia (#44)
- Chinese Taipei (#46)
- Slovenia (#47)
- Tunisia (#48)
- Denmark (#49)
- Poland (#50)
- South Africa (#51)
- Barbados (#52)
- Dominican Republic (#53)

Unseeded teams

- Hong Kong (#54)
- El Salvador (#55)
- Estonia (#56)
- Latvia (#57)
- Greece (#58)
- Bulgaria (#59)
- Egypt (#60)
- Indonesia (#61)
- Monaco (#62)
- Ireland (#63)
- China (#64)
- Thailand (#65)

Home team	Score	Away team	Location	Venue	Surface
Uruguay [1]	2–3	China	Montevideo	Carrasco Lawn Tenis Club	Clay
Lebanon [2]	3–2	Monaco	Zouk Mosbeh	Notre Dame University–Louaize	Hard
Lithuania [3]	3–1	Egypt	Vilnius	SEB Arena	Hard (i)
Thailand	3–1	Bolivia [4]	Bangkok	The Lawn Tennis Association of Thailand	Hard
Chinese Taipei [5]	3–1	Hong Kong	Taipei City	Taipei Tennis Center	Hard
Slovenia [6]	4–0	Estonia	Portorož	Tennis Center Portorož	Clay
Tunisia [7]	1–3	Greece	Tunis	Courts de Tennis	Hard
El Salvador	2–3	Denmark [8]	San José Villanueva	Club El Encanto	Hard
Poland [9]	5–0	Indonesia	Inowrocław	Hala Widowiskowo Sportowa	Hard (i)
Bulgaria	3–0	South Africa [10]	Sofia	National Tennis Centre	Clay
Barbados [11]	2–3	Ireland	St. Michael	National Tennis Centre	Hard
Latvia	3–2	Dominican Republic [12]	Jūrmala	National Tennis Centre Lielupe	Hard (i)

=== Qualifying round ===
Date: 4–5 March 2022

Twenty-four teams played for twelve spots in the World Group II, in series decided on a home and away basis.

These twenty-four teams were:

- 2 losing teams from World Group II Knock-out ties.
- 12 losing teams from World Group II.
- 10 teams from their Group III zone:
  - 3 from Europe
  - 3 from Asia/Oceania,
  - 2 from Americas, and
  - 2 from Africa.

The 12 winning teams from the play-offs played at the World Group II and the 12 losing teams played at the Group III of the corresponding continental zone.

#: Nations ranking as of 20 September 2021.

Qualified teams

- China (#42)
- Dominican Republic (#48)
- Thailand (#50)
- Chinese Taipei (#53)
- Venezuela (#55)
- Estonia (#58)
- Egypt (#59)
- Greece (#60)
- Morocco (#61)
- Bulgaria (#62)
- Zimbabwe (#63)
- Hong Kong (#64)

- Indonesia (#65)
- Vietnam (#66)
- El Salvador (#67)
- Paraguay (#68)
- Jamaica (#69)
- Latvia (#70)
- Monaco (#71)
- Guatemala (#75)
- Ireland (#77)
- Cyprus (#79=)
- Pacific Oceania (#79=)
- Benin (#81)

Home team	Score	Away team	Location	Venue	Surface
China [1]	w/o	Ireland	—N/a	—N/a	—N/a
Dominican Republic [2]	3–0	Vietnam	Santo Domingo	Centro Nacional de Tenis Parque Del Este	Hard
Thailand [3]	2–3	Latvia	Bangkok	Lawn Tennis Association of Thailand	Hard
Guatemala	0–4	Chinese Taipei [4]	Guatemala City	Complejo de Tenis Ing. Juan José Hermosilla	Hard
Indonesia	3–0	Venezuela [5]	Jakarta	Gelora Bung Karno Sports Complex	Hard
Estonia [6]	4–0	Pacific Oceania	Tallinn	Forus Tenniscenter	Hard (i)
Egypt [7]	4–1	Cyprus	Cairo	Gezira Sporting Club	Clay
Greece [8]	3–2	Jamaica	Athens	Ace Tennis Club	Clay (i)
Monaco	4–0	Morocco [9]	Roquebrune-Cap-Martin (France)	Monte Carlo Country Club	Clay
Bulgaria [10]	3–1	Paraguay	Sofia	Sport Hall "Sofia"	Hard (i)
Zimbabwe [11]	1–3	El Salvador	Harare	Harare Sports Club	Hard
Benin	1–3	Hong Kong [12]	Cotonou	Stade de l’Amitié Général Mathieu Kérékou	Hard

== Group III ==
=== Americas Zone ===
Dates: 22–25 June 2022

Location: Costa Rica Country Club, Escazú, Costa Rica (Hard)

The top three nations were promoted to the 2023 Davis Cup World Group II play-offs and the last two nations were relegated to 2023 Americas Zone Group IV

Teams

- Bahamas
- Costa Rica (Host)
- Guatemala
- Jamaica

- Panama
- Paraguay
- Puerto Rico
- Venezuela

Promotions/Relegations

- Paraguay, Venezuela and Jamaica qualify for the 2023 Davis Cup World Group II play-offs
- Guatemala and Puerto Rico are relegated to 2023 Davis Cup Americas Zone Group IV

=== Asia/Oceania Zone ===
Dates: 10–13 August 2022

Location: Hai Dang Tennis Club, Tây Ninh, Vietnam (Hard)

The top three nations were promoted to the 2023 Davis Cup World Group II play-offs and the last two nations were relegated to 2023 Asia/Oceania Zone Group IV

Teams

- Iran
- Jordan
- Malaysia
- Pacific Oceania

- Saudi Arabia
- Syria
- United Arab Emirates
- Vietnam (Host)

Promotions/Relegations

- Jordan, Pacific Oceania and Vietnam qualify for the 2023 Davis Cup World Group II play-offs
- Syria and United Arab Emirates are relegated to 2023 Davis Cup Asia/Oceania Zone Group IV

Inactive teams

- Philippines (Suspended)

=== Europe Zone ===
Dates: 22–25 June 2022

Location: Tennis Club Bellevue, Ulcinj, Montenegro (Clay)

The top three nations were promoted to the 2023 Davis Cup World Group II play-offs and the last two nations were relegated to 2023 Europe Zone Group IV

Teams

- Armenia
- Cyprus
- Georgia
- Liechtenstein

- Luxembourg
- Moldova
- Montenegro (Host)
- North Macedonia

Promotions/Relegations

- Georgia, Luxembourg and Cyprus qualify for the 2023 Davis Cup World Group II play-offs
- Armenia and Liechtenstein are relegated to 2023 Davis Cup Europe Zone Group IV

=== Africa Zone ===
Dates: 10–13 August 2022

Location: Tennis Club de Bachdjarah, Algiers, Algeria (Clay)

The top three nations were promoted to the 2023 Davis Cup World Group II play-offs and the last two nations were relegated to 2023 Africa Zone Group IV

Teams

- Algeria (Host)
- Benin
- Ivory Coast
- Kenya

- Morocco
- Mozambique
- Namibia
- Zimbabwe

Promotions/Relegations

- Ivory Coast, Morocco and Zimbabwe qualify for the 2023 Davis Cup World Group II play-offs
- Kenya and Mozambique are relegated to 2023 Davis Cup Africa Zone Group IV

== Group IV ==
=== Americas Zone ===
Dates: 1–6 August 2022

Location: National Racquet Centre, Tacarigua, Trinidad & Tobago (Hard)

The top two nations were promoted to the 2023 Davis Cup Americas Zone Group III

Teams

- Antigua and Barbuda
- Aruba
- Bermuda
- Cuba
- Haiti

- Honduras
- Nicaragua
- Trinidad and Tobago (Host)
- U.S. Virgin Islands

Inactive Teams

- Eastern Caribbean
- Saint Lucia

Promotions

- Bermuda and Honduras are promoted to 2023 Davis Cup Americas Zone Group III

=== Asia/Oceania Zone ===
Dates: 8–13 August 2022 and 17–22 October 2022

Location: Sri Lanka Tennis Association Courts, Colombo, Sri Lanka (Clay) and Bahrain Tennis Federation, Isa Town, Bahrain (Hard)

The top two nations will be promoted to the 2023 Davis Cup Asia/Oceania Zone Group III

Teams

- Bahrain (Host)
- Bangladesh
- Brunei
- Bhutan
- Cambodia
- Guam
- Iraq
- Kuwait
- Kyrgyzstan

- Laos
- Maldives
- Mongolia
- Singapore
- Sri Lanka (Host)
- Turkmenistan
- Yemen

Inactive Teams

- Macau
- Myanmar
- Oman

- Qatar
- Tajikistan

Promotions/Relegations

- Sri Lanka and Cambodia qualify for the 2023 Davis Cup Asia/Oceania Zone Group III.

=== Europe Zone ===
Dates: 27–30 July 2022

Location: Baku Tennis Academy, Baku, Azerbaijan (Hard)

The top two nations were promoted to the 2023 Davis Cup Europe Zone Group III

Teams

- Albania
- Andorra
- Azerbaijan (Host)
- Iceland

- Kosovo
- Malta
- San Marino

Promotions

- San Marino and Malta are promoted to 2023 Davis Cup Europe Zone Group III

=== Africa Zone ===
Dates: 4–9 July 2022 and 27–30 July 2022

Location: Ecology Tennis Club, Kigali, Rwanda (Clay) and MUNDI Sport Complex, Yaoundé, Cameroon (Hard)

The top two nations were promoted to the 2023 Davis Cup Africa Zone Group III

Teams

- Angola
- Botswana
- Burundi
- Cameroon (Host)
- Congo
- DR Congo
- Ethiopia
- Gabon
- Ghana

- Mauritius
- Nigeria
- Rwanda (Host)
- Senegal
- Sudan
- Tanzania
- Togo
- Uganda

Inactive Teams

- Burkina Faso
- Djibouti
- Lesotho
- Libya

- Madagascar
- Mali
- Zambia

Promotions

- Togo and Senegal are promoted to 2023 Davis Cup Africa Zone Group III
