= 2023 Davis Cup Europe Zone Group III =

Davis Cup competition in 2023

The Europe Zone was the unique zone within Group 3 of the regional Davis Cup competition in 2023. The zone's competition was held in round robin format in Larnaca, Cyprus, from 14 to 17 June 2023.

== Participating nations ==
- Cyprus
- Estonia
- Malta
- Moldova
- Montenegro
- North Macedonia
- San Marino

== Draw ==
Date: 14–17 June 2023

Location: Herodotou Tennis Academy, Larnaca, Cyprus (Hard)

Format: Round-robin basis. One pool of four teams and one pool of three teams and nations will play each team once in their group. Nations finishing first in each group will be promoted to World Group II play-offs in 2024. Nations finishing second in each group will enter a promotion play-off and the winner will be promoted to World Group II play-offs in 2024.

Nations finishing third in each group will enter a relegation play-off and the lost team as well as the fourth team in Pool B will be relegated to Europe Zone Group IV in 2024.

=== Seeding ===
Pot	Nation	Rank^{1}	Seed
1	Estonia		
1	Cyprus		
2	San Marino		
2	North Macedonia		
3	Montenegro		
3	Malta		
3	Moldova		

- ^{1}Davis Cup Rankings as of

=== Round Robin ===
==== Pool A ====
	EST	MNE	SMR	RR; W–L	Set; W–L	Game; W–L	Standings
Estonia		2–1	3–0	2–0	5–1 (%)	– (%)	1
Montenegro	1–2		3–0	1–1	4–2 (%)	– (%)	2
San Marino	0–3	0–3		0–2	0–6 (%)	– (%)	3

==== Pool B ====
	MDA	CYP	MKD	MLT	RR; W–L	Set; W–L	Game; W–L	Standings
Moldova		3–0	3–0	3–0	3–0	9–0 (%)	– (%)	1
Cyprus	0–3		3–0	3–0	2–1	6–3 (%)	– (%)	2
North Macedonia	0–3	0–3		2–1	1–2	2–7 (%)	– (%)	3
Malta	0–3	0–3	1–2		0–3	1–8 (%)	– (%)	4

Standings are determined by: 1. number of wins; 2. number of matches; 3. in two-team ties, head-to-head records; 4. in three-team ties, (a) percentage of sets won (head-to-head records if two teams remain tied), then (b) percentage of games won (head-to-head records if two teams remain tied), then (c) Davis Cup rankings.

=== Playoffs ===
Placing	A Team	Score	B Team
First	Estonia	2–0	Moldova
Promotional	Montenegro	0–2	Cyprus
Relegation	San Marino	1–2	North Macedonia
Seventh	—		Malta

- Estonia, Moldova and Cyprus were promoted to 2024 Davis Cup World Group II play-offs.
- San Marino and Malta were relegated to 2024 Davis Cup Europe Zone Group IV.

== Round Robin ==
=== Pool A ===
==== Estonia vs. Montenegro ====
Estonia
2
Herodotou Tennis Academy, Larnaca, Cyprus
14 June 2023
Hard

Montenegro
1

			1	2	3
1	(Estonia) (Montenegro)	Daniil Glinka; Matija Samardžić	6; 4	6; 0
2	(Estonia) (Montenegro)	Mark Lajal; Petar Jovanović	6; 3	3; 6	3; 6
3	(Estonia) (Montenegro)	Johannes Seeman / Siim Troost; Petar Jovanović / Matija Samardžić	7; 5	7; 5

==== San Marino vs. Montenegro ====
San Marino
0
Herodotou Tennis Academy, Larnaca, Cyprus
15 June 2023
Hard

Montenegro
3

			1	2	3
1	(San Marino) (Montenegro)	Mattia Muraccini; Matija Samardžić	1; 6	2; 6
2	(San Marino) (Montenegro)	Marco De Rossi; Petar Jovanović	4; 6	3; 6
3	(San Marino) (Montenegro)	Mattia Muraccini / Filippo Tommesani; Emil Dapčević / Simon Knežević	0; 6	4; 6

==== Estonia vs. San Marino ====
Estonia
3
Herodotou Tennis Academy, Larnaca, Cyprus
16 June 2023
Hard

San Marino
0

			1	2	3
1	(Estonia) (San Marino)	Siim Troost; Filippo Tommesani	6; 1	6; 1
2	(Estonia) (San Marino)	Daniil Glinka; Marco De Rossi	6; 1	6; 1
3	(Estonia) (San Marino)	Johannes Seeman / Siim Troost; Mattia Muraccini / Filippo Tommesani	6; 0	6; 1

=== Pool B ===
==== Cyprus vs. Moldova ====
Cyprus
0
Herodotou Tennis Academy, Larnaca, Cyprus
14 June 2023
Hard

Moldova
3

			1	2	3
1	(Cyprus) (Moldova)	Petros Chrysochos; Ilya Snițari	3; 6	2; 6
2	(Cyprus) (Moldova)	Menelaos Efstathiou; Alexandr Cozbinov	6^{8} 7^{10}	7; 5	2; 6
3	(Cyprus) (Moldova)	Sergis Kyratzis / Eleftherios Neos; Alexandr Cozbinov / Ilya Snițari	5; 7	3; 6

==== North Macedonia vs. Malta ====
North Macedonia
2
Herodotou Tennis Academy, Larnaca, Cyprus
14 June 2023
Hard

Malta
1

			1	2	3
1	(North Macedonia) (Malta)	Obrad Markovski; Alex Degabriele	6; 4	2; 6	6^{3} 7^{7}
2	(North Macedonia) (Malta)	Kalin Ivanovski; Liam Delicata	6; 2	6; 4
3	(North Macedonia) (Malta)	Berk Bugarikj / Kalin Ivanovski; Alex Degabriele / Liam Delicata	6; 4	6; 4

==== Cyprus vs. Malta ====
Cyprus
3
Herodotou Tennis Academy, Larnaca, Cyprus
15 June 2023
Hard

Malta
0

			1	2	3
1	(Cyprus) (Malta)	Stylianos Christodoulou; Alex Degabriele	6; 3	6; 3
2	(Cyprus) (Malta)	Menelaos Efstathiou; Liam Delicata	6; 0	6; 1
3	(Cyprus) (Malta)	Sergis Kyratzis / Eleftherios Neos; Alex Degabriele / Liam Delicata	6; 2	6; 1

==== North Macedonia vs. Moldova ====
North Macedonia
0
Herodotou Tennis Academy, Larnaca, Cyprus
15 June 2023
Hard

Moldova
3

			1	2	3
1	(North Macedonia) (Moldova)	Berk Bugarikj; Ilya Snițari	6; 4	2; 6	3; 6
2	(North Macedonia) (Moldova)	Kalin Ivanovski; Alexandr Cozbinov	5; 7	2; 5
3	(North Macedonia) (Moldova)	Amar Huseinovic / Obrad Markovski; Alexandr Cozbinov / Ilya Snițari	3; 6	5; 7

==== Cyprus vs. North Macedonia ====
Cyprus
3
Herodotou Tennis Academy, Larnaca, Cyprus
16 June 2023
Hard

North Macedonia
0

			1	2	3
1	(Cyprus) (North Macedonia)	Stylianos Christodoulou; Amar Huseinovic	6; 1	6; 2
2	(Cyprus) (North Macedonia)	Menelaos Efstathiou; Obrad Markovski	6; 1	6; 2
3	(Cyprus) (North Macedonia)	Sergis Kyratzis / Eleftherios Neos; Amar Huseinovic / Obrad Markovski	6; 0	6; 4

==== Malta vs. Moldova ====
Malta
0
Herodotou Tennis Academy, Larnaca, Cyprus
16 June 2023
Hard

Moldova
3

			1	2	3
1	(Malta) (Moldova)	Alex Degabriele; Ilya Snițari	1; 6	1; 6
2	(Malta) (Moldova)	Liam Delicata; Alexandr Cozbinov	6; 3	3; 6	0; 6
3	(Malta) (Moldova)	Alex Degabriele / Dwayne Lukas Pullicino; Ilie Cazac / Andrei Ciumac	2; 6	6^{2} 7^{7}

== Play-offs ==
=== First place play-off ===
==== Estonia vs. Moldova ====
Estonia
2
Herodotou Tennis Academy, Larnaca, Cyprus
17 June 2023
Hard

Moldova
0

			1	2	3
1	(Estonia) (Moldova)	Johannes Seeman; Andrei Ciumac	3; 6	6; 2	6; 1
2	(Estonia) (Moldova)	Daniil Glinka; Ilie Cazac	6; 1	6; 2
3	(Estonia) (Moldova)	Johannes Seeman / Siim Troost; Ilie Cazac / Andrei Ciumac				not played

=== Promotional play-off ===
==== Montenegro vs. Cyprus ====
Montenegro
0
Herodotou Tennis Academy, Larnaca, Cyprus
17 June 2023
Hard

Cyprus
2

			1	2	3
1	(Montenegro) (Cyprus)	Matija Samardžić; Petros Chrysochos	5; 7	2; 6
2	(Montenegro) (Cyprus)	Petar Jovanović; Menelaos Efstathiou	5; 7	3; 6
3	(Montenegro) (Cyprus)	Petar Jovanović / Matija Samardžić; Sergis Kyratzis / Eleftherios Neos				not played

=== Relegation play-off ===
==== San Marino vs. North Macedonia ====
San Marino
1
Herodotou Tennis Academy, Larnaca, Cyprus
17 June 2023
Hard

North Macedonia
2

			1	2	3
1	(San Marino) (North Macedonia)	Mattia Muraccini; Berk Bugarikj	5; 7	2; 6
2	(San Marino) (North Macedonia)	Marco De Rossi; Obrad Markovski	6; 0	6; 1
3	(San Marino) (North Macedonia)	Marco De Rossi / Filippo Tommesani; Berk Bugarikj / Amar Huseinovic	4; 6	3; 6

== Final placements ==
Placing	Teams
Promoted/First	Estonia
Promoted/Second	Moldova
Promoted/Third	Cyprus
Fourth	Montenegro
Fifth	North Macedonia
Relegated/Sixth	San Marino
Relegated/Seventh	Malta

- Estonia, Moldova and Cyprus were promoted to 2024 Davis Cup World Group II play-offs.
- San Marino and Malta were relegated to 2024 Davis Cup Europe Zone Group IV.
