= 2024 Davis Cup World Group II =

Tennis competition

The 2024 Davis Cup World Group II was held in September. The twelve winners and two highest-ranked losers from the World Group II will play at the World Group I play-offs and the ten lowest-ranked losers will play at the World Group II play-offs in 2025.

== Teams ==
Twenty-four teams participated in the World Group II, in series decided on a home and away basis. The seedings were based on the Nations Ranking.

These twenty-four teams were:

- 12 losing teams from the World Group I play-offs in February 2024
- 12 winning teams from the World Group II play-offs in February 2024

The 12 winning teams and 2 highest-ranked losing teams from the World Group II will play in the World Group I play-offs and the 10 lowest-ranked losing teams will play in the World Group II play-offs in 2025.

#: Nations Ranking as of 5 February 2024.

Seeded teams

1. Romania (#37)
2. Ecuador (#39)
3. Uzbekistan (#42)
4. Bulgaria (#44)
5. Latvia (#45=)
6. Mexico (#45=)
7. New Zealand (#45=)
8. Pakistan (#45=)
9. Ireland (#49)
10. Lebanon (#50)
11. Morocco (#51)
12. Uruguay (#52)

Unseeded teams

- Barbados (#53)
- South Africa (#54)
- El Salvador (#55)
- Hong Kong (#56)
- Monaco (#57)
- Tunisia (#58)
- Luxembourg (#59)
- Georgia (#60)
- Bolivia (#61)
- China (#62)
- Togo (#65)
- Estonia (#66)

== Results summary ==
| Home team | Score | Away team | Location | Venue | Surface |
|---|---|---|---|---|---|
| Romania [1] | 3–2 | China | Craiova | Polyvalent Hall | Hard (i) |
| Hong Kong | 2–3 | Ecuador [2] | Hong Kong | Victoria Park Tennis Stadium | Hard |
| Uzbekistan [3] | 3–1 | Estonia | Tashkent | Sakhovat Sport Servis | Hard |
| Bulgaria [4] | 3–2 | El Salvador | Plovdiv | Tennis Club Lokomotiv | Clay |
| Barbados | 3–1 | Pakistan [5] | Bridgetown | National Tennis Centre | Hard |
| Togo | 4–0 | Latvia [6] | Lomé | Stade Omnisport de Lomé | Hard |
| Georgia | 3–2 | Mexico [7] | Tbilisi | Alex Metreveli Tennis Complex | Hard |
| New Zealand [8] | 2–3 | Luxembourg | Palmerston North | Fly Palmy Arena | Hard (i) |
| Tunisia | 3–2 | Ireland [9] | La Marsa | Tennis Club de l'Avenir Sportif de la Marsa | Clay |
| Lebanon [10] | 3–1 | South Africa | Cairo (Egypt) | Palm Hills Sports Club | Clay |
| Morocco [11] | 0–4 | Monaco | Marrakesh | Royal Tennis Club de Marrakech | Clay (i) |
| Bolivia | 1–3 | Uruguay [12] | Santa Cruz de la Sierra | Las Palmas Country Club | Clay |

== Results ==
=== Romania vs. China ===
Romania
3
Polyvalent Hall, Craiova, Romania
13–14 September 2024
Hard (i)

China
2

| | | | 1 | 2 | 3 |
|---|---|---|---|---|---|
| 1 | (Romania) (China) | Cezar Crețu; Buyunchaokete | 3; 6 | 6; 4 | 7^{7} 6^{4} |
| 2 | (Romania) (China) | Gabi Adrian Boitan; Zhou Yi | 7^{7} 6^{4} | 6; 2 |
| 3 | (Romania) (China) | Victor Vlad Cornea / Bogdan Pavel; Sun Fajing / Te Rigele | 4; 6 | 4; 6 |
| 4 | (Romania) (China) | Gabi Adrian Boitan; Buyunchaokete | 3; 6 | 6^{3} 7^{7} |
| 5 | (Romania) (China) | Cezar Crețu; Te Rigele | 3; 6 | 6; 3 | 6; 3 |

=== Hong Kong vs. Ecuador ===
Hong Kong
2
Victoria Park Tennis Stadium, Hong Kong, China
14–15 September 2024
Hard

Ecuador
3

| | | | 1 | 2 | 3 |
|---|---|---|---|---|---|
| 1 | (Hong Kong) (Ecuador) | Jack Cheng; Andrés Andrade | 1; 6 | 1; 6 |
| 2 | (Hong Kong) (Ecuador) | Coleman Wong; Marcos Lee Chan Baratau | 6; 3 | 3; 6 | 6; 1 |
| 3 | (Hong Kong) (Ecuador) | Wong Chun-hun / Coleman Wong; Gonzalo Escobar / Diego Hidalgo | 6^{4} 7^{7} | 3; 6 |
| 4 | (Hong Kong) (Ecuador) | Coleman Wong; Andrés Andrade | 6; 4 | 6; 2 |
| 5 | (Hong Kong) (Ecuador) | Ng Ki-lung; Gonzalo Escobar | 1; 6 | 3; 6 |

=== Uzbekistan vs. Estonia ===
Uzbekistan
3
Sakhovat Sport Servis, Tashkent, Uzbekistan
13–14 September 2024
Hard

Estonia
1

| | | | 1 | 2 | 3 |
|---|---|---|---|---|---|---|
| 1 | (Uzbekistan) (Estonia) | Sergey Fomin; Mark Lajal | 4; 6 | 6; 4 | 6^{6} 7^{8} |
| 2 | (Uzbekistan) (Estonia) | Khumoyun Sultanov; Kristjan Tamm | 7^{7} 6^{2} | 6; 4 |
| 3 | (Uzbekistan) (Estonia) | Sergey Fomin / Khumoyun Sultanov; Johannes Seeman / Siim Troost | 6; 0 | 6; 4 |
| 4 | (Uzbekistan) (Estonia) | Khumoyun Sultanov; Mark Lajal | 6; 4 | 6; 1 |
| 5 | (Uzbekistan) (Estonia) | Sergey Fomin; Kristjan Tamm | | | | not played |

=== Bulgaria vs. El Salvador ===
Bulgaria
3
Tennis Club Lokomotiv, Plovdiv, Bulgaria
14–16 September 2024
Clay

El Salvador
2

| | | | 1 | 2 | 3 |
|---|---|---|---|---|---|
| 1 | (Bulgaria) (El Salvador) | Pyotr Nesterov; Marcelo Arévalo | 3; 6 | 3; 6 |
| 2 | (Bulgaria) (El Salvador) | Yanaki Milev; César Cruz | 6; 3 | 4; 6 | 6; 3 |
| 3 | (Bulgaria) (El Salvador) | Alexander Donski / Pyotr Nesterov; Marcelo Arévalo / César Cruz | 7; 5 | 6^{4} 7^{7} | 3; 6 |
| 4 | (Bulgaria) (El Salvador) | Iliyan Radulov; Juan Carlos Fuentes Vásquez | 6; 1 | 6; 2 |
| 5 | (Bulgaria) (El Salvador) | Yanaki Milev; Marcelo Arévalo | 2; 6 | 6; 1 | 7^{8} 6^{6} |

=== Barbados vs. Pakistan ===
Barbados
3
National Tennis Centre, Bridgetown, Barbados
14–15 September 2024
Hard

Pakistan
1

| | | | 1 | 2 | 3 |
|---|---|---|---|---|---|---|
| 1 | (Barbados) (Pakistan) | Darian King; Muhammad Shoaib | 6; 3 | 6; 0 |
| 2 | (Barbados) (Pakistan) | Kaipo Marshall; Aqeel Khan | 6; 3 | 1; 6 | 4; 6 |
| 3 | (Barbados) (Pakistan) | Darian King / Haydn Lewis; Aqeel Khan / Aisam-ul-Haq Qureshi | 7^{7} 6^{3} | 6^{1} 7^{7} | 6; 2 |
| 4 | (Barbados) (Pakistan) | Darian King; Yousaf Khalil | 6; 3 | 6; 0 |
| 5 | (Barbados) (Pakistan) | Kaipo Marshall; Muhammad Shoaib | | | | not played |

=== Togo vs. Latvia ===
Togo
4
Stade Omnisport de Lomé, Lomé, Togo
14–15 September 2024
Hard

Latvia
0

| | | | 1 | 2 | 3 |
|---|---|---|---|---|---|---|
| 1 | (Togo) (Latvia) | Thomas Setodji; Dāvis Rolis | 6; 4 | 6; 4 |
| 2 | (Togo) (Latvia) | Liova Ajavon; Daniels Tens | 7; 5 | 6; 3 |
| 3 | (Togo) (Latvia) | Hod'Abalo Isak Padio / Thomas Setodji; Dāvis Rolis / Daniels Tens | 7^{7} 6^{5} | 6; 1 |
| 4 | (Togo) (Latvia) | Thomas Setodji; Daniels Tens | 7^{7} 6^{5} | 6; 4 |
| 5 | (Togo) (Latvia) | Liova Ajavon; Dāvis Rolis | | | | not played |

=== Georgia vs. Mexico ===
Georgia
3
Alex Metreveli Tennis Complex, Tbilisi, Georgia
14–15 September 2024
Hard

Mexico
2

| | | | 1 | 2 | 3 |
|---|---|---|---|---|---|---|
| 1 | (Georgia (country)) (Mexico) | Saba Purtseladze; Alan Fernando Rubio Fierros | 6^{3} 7^{7} | 4; 6 |
| 2 | (Georgia (country)) (Mexico) | Aleksandre Bakshi; Rodrigo Pacheco Méndez | 7^{7} 6^{2} | 7^{7} 6^{5} |
| 3 | (Georgia (country)) (Mexico) | Aleksandre Bakshi / Zura Tkemaladze; Rodrigo Pacheco Méndez / Miguel Ángel Reyes-Varela | 6; 2 | 1; 6 | 6; 3 |
| 4 | (Georgia (country)) (Mexico) | Saba Purtseladze; Rodrigo Pacheco Méndez | 2; 6 | 1; 2 | | retired |
| 5 | (Georgia (country)) (Mexico) | Aleksandre Bakshi; Alan Fernando Rubio Fierros | 6; 3 | 7^{7} 6^{5} |

=== New Zealand vs. Luxembourg ===
New Zealand
2
Fly Palmy Arena, Palmerston North, New Zealand
14–15 September 2024
Hard (i)

Luxembourg
3

| | | | 1 | 2 | 3 |
|---|---|---|---|---|---|
| 1 | (New Zealand) (Luxembourg) | Kiranpal Pannu; Alex Knaff | 1; 6 | 7^{10} 6^{8} | 5; 7 |
| 2 | (New Zealand) (Luxembourg) | Ajeet Rai; Chris Rodesch | 2; 6 | 4; 6 |
| 3 | (New Zealand) (Luxembourg) | Ajeet Rai / Finn Reynolds; Raphael Calzi / Gilles Kremer | 6; 3 | 6; 2 |
| 4 | (New Zealand) (Luxembourg) | Jack Loutit; Chris Rodesch | 7; 5 | 6; 4 |
| 5 | (New Zealand) (Luxembourg) | Rubin Statham; Alex Knaff | 3; 6 | 2; 6 |

=== Tunisia vs. Ireland ===
Tunisia
3
Tennis Club de l'Avenir Sportif de la Marsa, Tunis, Tunisia
13–14 September 2024
Clay

Ireland
2

| | | | 1 | 2 | 3 |
|---|---|---|---|---|---|
| 1 | (Tunisia) (Republic of Ireland) | Skander Mansouri; Michael Agwi | 6^{5} 7^{7} | 3; 6 |
| 2 | (Tunisia) (Republic of Ireland) | Aziz Dougaz; Conor Gannon | 6; 3 | 6; 1 |
| 3 | (Tunisia) (Republic of Ireland) | Skander Mansouri / Aziz Ouakaa; Michael Agwi / Conor Gannon | 7^{7} 6^{4} | 6; 3 |
| 4 | (Tunisia) (Republic of Ireland) | Aziz Dougaz; Michael Agwi | 3; 6 | 4; 6 |
| 5 | (Tunisia) (Republic of Ireland) | Skander Mansouri; Conor Gannon | 6; 3 | 6; 1 |

=== Lebanon vs. South Africa ===
Lebanon
3
Palm Hills Sports Club, Cairo, Egypt
14–15 September 2024
Clay

South Africa
1

| | | | 1 | 2 | 3 |
|---|---|---|---|---|---|---|
| 1 | (Lebanon) (South Africa) | Benjamin Hassan; Alec Beckley | 6; 4 | 6; 2 |
| 2 | (Lebanon) (South Africa) | Hady Habib; Philip Henning | 6; 4 | 3; 6 | 7^{7} 6^{3} |
| 3 | (Lebanon) (South Africa) | Hady Habib / Benjamin Hassan; Alec Beckley / Philip Henning | 6^{5} 7^{7} | 3; 6 |
| 4 | (Lebanon) (South Africa) | Benjamin Hassan; Philip Henning | 6; 2 | 6; 3 |
| 5 | (Lebanon) (South Africa) | Hady Habib; Alec Beckley | | | | not played |

=== Morocco vs. Monaco ===
Morocco
0
Royal Tennis Club de Marrakech, Marrakesh, Morocco
14–15 September 2024
Clay (i)

Monaco
4

| | | | 1 | 2 | 3 |
|---|---|---|---|---|---|---|
| 1 | (Morocco) (Monaco) | Yassine Dlimi; Hugo Nys | 2; 6 | 6^{4} 7^{7} |
| 2 | (Morocco) (Monaco) | Elliot Benchetrit; Romain Arneodo | 6; 4 | 5; 7 | 3; 6 |
| 3 | (Morocco) (Monaco) | Elliot Benchetrit / Younes Lalami Laaroussi; Romain Arneodo / Hugo Nys | 2; 6 | 5; 7 |
| 4 | (Morocco) (Monaco) | Younes Lalami Laaroussi; Benjamin Balleret | 3; 6 | 3; 6 |
| 5 | (Morocco) (Monaco) | Yassine Dlimi; Romain Arneodo | | | | not played |

=== Bolivia vs. Uruguay ===
Bolivia
1
Las Palmas Country Club, Santa Cruz de la Sierra, Bolivia
13–14 September 2024
Clay

Uruguay
3

| | | | 1 | 2 | 3 |
|---|---|---|---|---|---|---|
| 1 | (Bolivia) (Uruguay) | Hugo Dellien; Joaquin Aguilar Cardozo | 6; 2 | 6; 3 |
| 2 | (Bolivia) (Uruguay) | Murkel Dellien; Franco Roncadelli | 2; 6 | 2; 6 |
| 3 | (Bolivia) (Uruguay) | Boris Arias / Federico Zeballos; Ariel Behar / Ignacio Carou | 3; 6 | 6; 1 | 3; 6 |
| 4 | (Bolivia) (Uruguay) | Hugo Dellien; Franco Roncadelli | 6; 2 | 3; 6 | 2; 6 |
| 5 | (Bolivia) (Uruguay) | Murkel Dellien; Joaquin Aguilar Cardozo | | | | not played |
