= 2023 Davis Cup Africa Zone Group III =

Davis Cup competition in 2023

The Africa Zone was the unique zone within Group 3 of the regional Davis Cup competition in 2023. The zone's competition was held in round robin format in Pretoria, South Africa, from 9 to 12 August 2023.

== Participating nations ==
- Algeria
- Benin
- Ivory Coast
- Namibia
- Senegal
- South Africa
- Togo
- Zimbabwe

== Draw ==
Date: 9–12 August 2023

Location: University of Pretoria, Pretoria, South Africa (Hard)

Format: Round-robin basis. Two pools of four teams and nations will play each team once in their group. Nations finishing first in each group will be promoted to World Group II play-offs in 2024. Nations finishing second in each group will enter a promotion play-off and the winner will be promoted to World Group II play-offs in 2024.

Nations finishing in the bottom two of each group will enter relegation play-offs, with the third of Group A facing the fourth of Group B, and the third of Group B facing the fourth of Group A and the two lost teams will be relegated to Africa Zone Group IV in 2024.

=== Seeding ===
Pot	Nation	Rank^{1}	Seed
1	South Africa		
1	Zimbabwe		
2	Ivory Coast		
2	Benin		
3	Algeria		
3	Namibia		
4	Togo		
4	Senegal		

- ^{1}Davis Cup Rankings as of

=== Round Robin ===
==== Pool A ====
	RSA	TOG	CIV	ALG	RR; W–L	Set; W–L	Game; W–L	Standings
South Africa		3–0	2–1	3–0	3–0	8–1 (%)	– (%)	1
Togo	0–3		2–1	2–1	2–1	4–5 (%)	– (%)	2
Ivory Coast	1–2	1–2		2–1	1–2	4–5 (%)	– (%)	3
Algeria	0–3	1–2	1–2		0–3	2–7 (%)	– (%)	4

==== Pool B ====
	ZIM	BEN	NAM	SEN	RR; W–L	Set; W–L	Game; W–L	Standings
Zimbabwe		2–1	1–2	2–1	2–1	5–4 (%)	– (%)	1
Benin	1–2		2–1	2–1	2–1	5–4 (%)	– (%)	2
Namibia	2–1	1–2		2–1	2–1	5–4 (%)	– (%)	3
Senegal	1–2	1–2	1–2		0–3	3–6 (%)	– (%)	4

Standings are determined by: 1. number of wins; 2. number of matches; 3. in two-team ties, head-to-head records; 4. in three-team ties, (a) percentage of sets won (head-to-head records if two teams remain tied), then (b) percentage of games won (head-to-head records if two teams remain tied), then (c) Davis Cup rankings.

=== Playoffs ===
Placing	A Team	Score	B Team
First	South Africa	3–0	Zimbabwe
Promotional	Togo	2–1	Benin
Relegation	Ivory Coast	2–0	Senegal
Relegation	Namibia	2–1	Algeria

- South Africa, Zimbabwe and Togo were promoted to 2024 Davis Cup World Group II play-offs.
- Senegal and Algeria were relegated to 2024 Davis Cup Africa Zone Group IV.

== Round Robin ==
=== Pool A ===
==== South Africa vs. Algeria ====
South Africa
3
University of Pretoria, Pretoria, South Africa
9 August 2023
Hard

Algeria
0

			1	2	3
1	(South Africa) (Algeria)	Devin Badenhorst; Toufik Sahtali	6; 2	7^{7} 6^{5}
2	(South Africa) (Algeria)	Philip Henning; Samir Hamza Reguig	6; 1	6; 0
3	(South Africa) (Algeria)	Philip Henning / Christiaan Worst; Samir Hamza Reguig / Toufik Sahtali	6; 3	6; 3

==== Ivory Coast vs. Togo ====
Ivory Coast
1
University of Pretoria, Pretoria, South Africa
9 August 2023
Hard

Togo
2

			1	2	3
1	(Ivory Coast) (Togo)	Alex Cyrille Lago; Komlavi Loglo	1; 6	2; 6
2	(Ivory Coast) (Togo)	Eliakim Coulibaly; Thomas Setodji	6; 1	6; 3
3	(Ivory Coast) (Togo)	Eliakim Coulibaly / Alex Cyrille Lago; Komlavi Loglo / Thomas Setodji	6^{5} 7^{7}	7; 5	5; 7

==== South Africa vs. Ivory Coast ====
South Africa
2
University of Pretoria, Pretoria, South Africa
10 August 2023
Hard

Ivory Coast
1

			1	2	3
1	(South Africa) (Ivory Coast)	Devin Badenhorst; Frederic Coulibaly	6; 1	6; 3
2	(South Africa) (Ivory Coast)	Philip Henning; Eliakim Coulibaly	6; 2	0; 6	4; 6
3	(South Africa) (Ivory Coast)	Philip Henning / Christiaan Worst; Eliakim Coulibaly / Alex Cyrille Lago	6; 4	6; 2

==== Algeria vs. Togo ====
Algeria
1
University of Pretoria, Pretoria, South Africa
10 August 2023
Hard

Togo
2

			1	2	3
1	(Algeria) (Togo)	Toufik Sahtali; Komlavi Loglo	6; 2	6; 3
2	(Algeria) (Togo)	Samir Hamza Reguig; Thomas Setodji	2; 6	1; 6
3	(Algeria) (Togo)	Samir Hamza Reguig / Toufik Sahtali; Komlavi Loglo / Thomas Setodji	6^{5} 7^{7}	2; 6

==== South Africa vs. Togo ====
South Africa
3
University of Pretoria, Pretoria, South Africa
11 August 2023
Hard

Togo
0

			1	2	3
1	(South Africa) (Togo)	Devin Badenhorst; Hod'abalo isak Padio	6; 3	6; 1
2	(South Africa) (Togo)	Philip Henning; Liova Ayite Ajavon	6; 2	6; 1
3	(South Africa) (Togo)	Leo Matthysen / Christiaan Worst; M'lapa Tingou Akomlo / Hod'abalo isak Padio	6; 2	6; 1

==== Ivory Coast vs. Algeria ====
Ivory Coast
2
University of Pretoria, Pretoria, South Africa
11 August 2023
Hard

Algeria
1

			1	2	3
1	(Ivory Coast) (Algeria)	Myko Yohann Himad Kouame; Toufik Sahtali	1; 6	0; 6
2	(Ivory Coast) (Algeria)	Eliakim Coulibaly; Samir Hamza Reguig	6; 2	6; 0
3	(Ivory Coast) (Algeria)	Eliakim Coulibaly / Alex Cyrille Lago; Samir Hamza Reguig / Toufik Sahtali	6; 4	6; 1

=== Pool B ===
==== Zimbabwe vs. Namibia ====
Zimbabwe
1
University of Pretoria, Pretoria, South Africa
9 August 2023
Hard

Namibia
2

			1	2	3
1	(Zimbabwe) (Namibia)	Benedict Badza; Connor Henry Van Schalkwyk	3; 6	4; 6
2	(Zimbabwe) (Namibia)	Benjamin Lock; Codie Schalk Van Schalkwyk	6; 3	6; 0
3	(Zimbabwe) (Namibia)	Benedict Badza / Benjamin Lock; Codie Schalk Van Schalkwyk / Connor Henry Van Schalkwyk	1; 6	4; 6

==== Benin vs. Senegal ====
Benin
2
University of Pretoria, Pretoria, South Africa
9 August 2023
Hard

Senegal
1

			1	2	3
1	(Benin) (Senegal)	Sylvestre Monnou; Yannick Languina	6; 2	6; 4
2	(Benin) (Senegal)	Loic Didavi; Seydina Andre	6; 3	6; 4
3	(Benin) (Senegal)	Alexis Klégou / Sylvestre Monnou; Hassimiyou Dieng / Yannick Languina	0; 6	0; 6

==== Zimbabwe vs. Benin ====
Zimbabwe
2
University of Pretoria, Pretoria, South Africa
10 August 2023
Hard

Benin
1

			1	2	3
1	(Zimbabwe) (Benin)	Benedict Badza; Sylvestre Monnou	6; 4	0; 6	1; 6
2	(Zimbabwe) (Benin)	Benjamin Lock; Loic Didavi	6; 2	6; 0
3	(Zimbabwe) (Benin)	Benedict Badza / Benjamin Lock; Loic Didavi / Sylvestre Monnou	6; 3	6; 2

==== Namibia vs. Senegal ====
Namibia
2
University of Pretoria, Pretoria, South Africa
10 August 2023
Hard

Senegal
1

			1	2	3
1	(Namibia) (Senegal)	Connor Henry Van Schalkwyk; Yannick Languina	6; 1	6; 0
2	(Namibia) (Senegal)	Codie Schalk Van Schalkwyk; Seydina Andre	7^{7} 6^{2}	5; 7	3; 6
3	(Namibia) (Senegal)	Codie Schalk Van Schalkwyk / Connor Henry Van Schalkwyk; Seydina Andre / Hassimiyou Dieng	6; 2	3; 6	7; 5

==== Zimbabwe vs. Senegal ====
Zimbabwe
2
University of Pretoria, Pretoria, South Africa
11 August 2023
Hard

Senegal
1

			1	2	3
1	(Zimbabwe) (Senegal)	Benedict Badza; Hassimiyou Dieng	6; 2	7^{7} 6^{1}
2	(Zimbabwe) (Senegal)	Benjamin Lock; Seydina Andre	3; 6	3; 6
3	(Zimbabwe) (Senegal)	Benedict Badza / Benjamin Lock; Seydina Andre / Hassimiyou Dieng	6; 4	6; 3

==== Benin vs. Namibia ====
Benin
2
University of Pretoria, Pretoria, South Africa
11 August 2023
Hard

Namibia
1

			1	2	3
1	(Benin) (Namibia)	Sylvestre Monnou; Steyn Dippenaar	6; 2	6; 1
2	(Benin) (Namibia)	Loic Didavi; Codie Schalk Van Schalkwyk	6; 1	4; 6	4; 6
3	(Benin) (Namibia)	Loic Didavi / Sylvestre Monnou; Steyn Dippenaar / Codie Schalk Van Schalkwyk	6; 4	6; 4

== Play-offs ==
=== First place play-off ===
==== South Africa vs. Zimbabwe ====
South Africa
3
University of Pretoria, Pretoria, South Africa
12 August 2023
Hard

Zimbabwe
0

			1	2	3
1	(South Africa) (Zimbabwe)	Devin Badenhorst; Takura Mhwandagara	6; 1	6; 2
2	(South Africa) (Zimbabwe)	Philip Henning; Benedict Badza	6; 4	6; 0
3	(South Africa) (Zimbabwe)	Leo Matthysen / Christiaan Worst; Benedict Badza / Takura Mhwandagara	6; 4	6; 3

=== Promotional play-off ===
==== Togo vs. Benin ====
Togo
2
University of Pretoria, Pretoria, South Africa
12 August 2023
Hard

Benin
1

			1	2	3
1	(Togo) (Benin)	Liova Ayite Ajavon; Sylvestre Monnou	5; 7	4; 6
2	(Togo) (Benin)	Thomas Setodji; Loic Didavi	7^{7} 6^{4}	6; 2
3	(Togo) (Benin)	Komlavi Loglo / Thomas Setodji; Loic Didavi / Sylvestre Monnou	6; 3	3; 6	7; 5

=== Relegation play-offs ===
==== Ivory Coast vs. Senegal ====
Ivory Coast
2
University of Pretoria, Pretoria, South Africa
12 August 2023
Hard

Senegal
0

			1	2	3
1	(Ivory Coast) (Senegal)	Frederic Coulibaly; Hassimiyou Dieng	7; 5	6; 3
2	(Ivory Coast) (Senegal)	Eliakim Coulibaly; Seydina Andre	7; 5	6; 3
3	(Ivory Coast) (Senegal)	Eliakim Coulibaly / Alex Cyrille Lago; Seydina Andre / Hassimiyou Dieng				not played

==== Namibia vs. Algeria ====
Namibia
2
University of Pretoria, Pretoria, South Africa
12 August 2023
Hard

Algeria
1

			1	2	3
1	(Namibia) (Algeria)	Daniel Jauss; Toufik Sahtali	1; 6	0; 6
2	(Namibia) (Algeria)	Codie Schalk Van Schalkwyk; Samir Hamza Reguig	4; 6	6; 1	6; 2
3	(Namibia) (Algeria)	Steyn Dippenaar / Codie Schalk Van Schalkwyk; Samir Hamza Reguig / Toufik Sahtali	4; 6	7^{7} 6^{2}	6; 3

== Final placements ==
Placing	Teams	
Promoted/First	South Africa	
Promoted/Second	Zimbabwe	
Promoted/Third	Togo	
Fourth	Benin	
Fifth	Ivory Coast	Namibia
Relegated/Seventh	Senegal	Algeria

- South Africa, Zimbabwe and Togo were promoted to 2024 Davis Cup World Group II play-offs.
- Senegal and Algeria were relegated to 2024 Davis Cup Africa Zone Group IV.
