= 2023 Davis Cup Americas Zone Group III =

Davis Cup competition in 2023

The Americas Zone was the unique zone within Group 3 of the regional Davis Cup competition in 2023. The zone's competition was held in round robin format in Asunción, Paraguay, from 19 to 24 June 2023.

== Participating nations ==
- Bahamas
- Bermuda
- Bolivia
- Costa Rica
- Dominican Republic
- Honduras
- Panama
- Paraguay
- Venezuela

== Draw ==
Date: 19–24 June 2023

Location: Club Internacional de Tenis, Asunción, Paraguay (Clay)

Format: Round-robin basis. One pool of four teams and one pool of five teams and nations will play each team once in their group. Nations finishing first in each group will be promoted to World Group II play-offs in 2024. Nations finishing second in each group will enter a promotion play-off and the winner will be promoted to World Group II play-offs in 2024.

Nations finishing fourth of each group will enter a relegation play-off and the lost team as well as the fifth team in Pool B will be relegated to Americas Zone Group IV in 2024.

=== Seeding ===
Pot	Nation	Rank^{1}	Seed
1	Bolivia		
1	Dominican Republic		
2	Venezuela		
2	Paraguay		
3	Bermuda		
3	Costa Rica		
4	Panama		
4	Bahamas		
4	Honduras		

- ^{1}Davis Cup Rankings as of

=== Round Robin ===
==== Pool A ====
	BOL	VEN	BER	PAN	RR; W–L	Set; W–L	Game; W–L	Standings
Bolivia		3–0	3–0	3–0	3–0	9–0 (%)	– (%)	1
Venezuela	0–3		2–1	3–0	2–1	5–4 (%)	– (%)	2
Bermuda	0–3	1–2		3–0	1–2	4–5 (%)	– (%)	3
Panama	0–3	0–3	0–3		0–3	0–9 (%)	– (%)	4

==== Pool B ====
	PAR	CRC	DOM	BAH	HON	RR; W–L	Set; W–L	Game; W–L	Standings
Paraguay		3–0	2–1	3–0	3–0	4–0	11–1 (%)	– (%)	1
Costa Rica	0–3		2–1	3–0	2–1	3–1	7–5 (%)	– (%)	2
Dominican Republic	1–2	1–2		2–1	2–1	2–2	6–6 (%)	– (%)	3
Bahamas	0–3	0–3	1–2		3–0	1–3	4–8 (%)	– (%)	4
Honduras	0–3	1–2	1–2	0–3		0–4	2–10 (%)	– (%)	5

Standings are determined by: 1. number of wins; 2. number of matches; 3. in two-team ties, head-to-head records; 4. in three-team ties, (a) percentage of sets won (head-to-head records if two teams remain tied), then (b) percentage of games won (head-to-head records if two teams remain tied), then (c) Davis Cup rankings.

=== Playoffs ===
Placing	A Team	Score	B Team
First	Bolivia	1–2	Paraguay
Promotional	Costa Rica	2–0	Venezuela
Fifth	Bermuda	2–1	Dominican Republic
Relegation	Panama	0–2	Bahamas
Ninth	—		Honduras

- Paraguay, Bolivia and Costa Rica were promoted to 2024 Davis Cup World Group II play-offs.
- Panama and Honduras were relegated to 2024 Davis Cup Americas Zone Group IV.

== Round Robin ==
=== Pool A ===
==== Bolivia vs. Bermuda ====
Bolivia
3
Club Internacional de Tenis, Asunción, Paraguay
20 June 2023
Clay

Bermuda
0

			1	2	3
1	(Bolivia) (Bermuda)	Raúl García; Richard Mallory	6; 3	6; 3
2	(Bolivia) (Bermuda)	Juan Carlos Prado Ángelo; Daniel Phillips	3; 6	6; 2	6; 1
3	(Bolivia) (Bermuda)	Agustin Eduardo Cuellar Lorberg / Raúl García; James Finnigan / Gavin Manders	6; 2	6; 1

==== Venezuela vs. Panama ====
Venezuela
3
Club Internacional de Tenis, Asunción, Paraguay
20 June 2023
Clay

Panama
0

			1	2	3
1	(Venezuela) (Panama)	Rafael Abdul Salam; Luis Gómez	6; 3	6; 2
2	(Venezuela) (Panama)	Ricardo Rodríguez-Pace; Guillermo David Rodriguez Pinilla	6; 0	6; 1
3	(Venezuela) (Panama)	Juan José Bianchi / Ricardo Rodríguez-Pace; Luis Ching / Luis Gómez	1; 6	6; 3	6; 2

==== Bolivia vs. Panama ====
Bolivia
3
Club Internacional de Tenis, Asunción, Paraguay
21 June 2023
Clay

Panama
0

			1	2	3
1	(Bolivia) (Panama)	Raúl García; Luis Ching	6; 1	6; 0
2	(Bolivia) (Panama)	Juan Carlos Prado Ángelo; Luis Gómez	6; 0	6; 0
3	(Bolivia) (Panama)	Juan Carlos Prado Ángelo / Ernesto Requena Leigue; Luis Gómez / Giuseppe Guarnieri	6; 3	6; 1

==== Venezuela vs. Bermuda ====
Venezuela
2
Club Internacional de Tenis, Asunción, Paraguay
21 June 2023
Clay

Bermuda
1

			1	2	3
1	(Venezuela) (Bermuda)	Rafael Abdul Salam; Richard Mallory	7^{7} 6^{5}	6; 4
2	(Venezuela) (Bermuda)	Ricardo Rodríguez-Pace; Daniel Phillips	6; 0	6^{6} 7^{8}	6; 3
3	(Venezuela) (Bermuda)	Juan José Bianchi / Ricardo Rodríguez-Pace; James Finnigan / Gavin Manders	6; 4			retired

==== Bolivia vs. Venezuela ====
Bolivia
3
Club Internacional de Tenis, Asunción, Paraguay
23 June 2023
Clay

Venezuela
0

			1	2	3
1	(Bolivia) (Venezuela)	Raúl García; Rafael Abdul Salam	6; 0	6; 1
2	(Bolivia) (Venezuela)	Juan Carlos Prado Ángelo; Ricardo Rodríguez-Pace	6; 3	7^{7} 6^{5}
3	(Bolivia) (Venezuela)	Agustin Eduardo Cuellar Lorberg / Ernesto Requena Leigue; Rafael Abdul Salam / Juan José Bianchi	3; 6			retired

==== Bermuda vs. Panama ====
Bermuda
3
Club Internacional de Tenis, Asunción, Paraguay
23 June 2023
Clay

Panama
0

			1	2	3
1	(Bermuda) (Panama)	Richard Mallory; Luis Ching	6; 3	6; 0
2	(Bermuda) (Panama)	Daniel Phillips; Luis Gómez	6; 2	6; 1
3	(Bermuda) (Panama)	James Finnigan / Gavin Manders; Guillermo David Rodriguez Pinilla / Chad Valdes	6; 4	6; 4

=== Pool B ===
==== Dominican Republic vs. Bahamas ====
Dominican Republic
2
Club Internacional de Tenis, Asunción, Paraguay
19 June 2023
Clay

Bahamas
1

			1	2	3
1	(Dominican Republic) (The Bahamas)	Alejandro Jose Gandini; Denali Nottage	6; 2	6; 4
2	(Dominican Republic) (The Bahamas)	Peter Bertran; Kevin Major	6; 4	6; 3
3	(Dominican Republic) (The Bahamas)	Enmanuel Munoz / Alberto Puello; Donte Armbrister / Marvin Rolle	6; 7	2; 6

==== Paraguay vs. Costa Rica ====
Paraguay
3
Club Internacional de Tenis, Asunción, Paraguay
19 June 2023
Clay

Costa Rica
0

			1	2	3
1	(Paraguay) (Costa Rica)	Martin Antonio Vergara del Puerto; Rodrigo Crespo Piedra	3; 6	7^{7} 6^{2}	6; 3
2	(Paraguay) (Costa Rica)	Daniel Vallejo; Jesse Flores	6; 4	6; 2
3	(Paraguay) (Costa Rica)	Daniel Vallejo / Martin Antonio Vergara del Puerto; Jesse Flores / Pablo Nunez	6; 1	7^{7} 6^{4}

==== Dominican Republic vs. Honduras ====
Dominican Republic
2
Club Internacional de Tenis, Asunción, Paraguay
20 June 2023
Clay

Honduras
1

			1	2	3
1	(Dominican Republic) (Honduras)	Alejandro Jose Gandini; Keny Turcios	2; 6	6; 3	4; 6
2	(Dominican Republic) (Honduras)	Peter Bertran; Alejandro Obando	6; 0	6; 2
3	(Dominican Republic) (Honduras)	Peter Bertran / Alejandro Jose Gandini; Alejandro Obando / Keny Turcios	6; 0	7^{7} 6^{2}

==== Paraguay vs. Bahamas ====
Paraguay
3
Club Internacional de Tenis, Asunción, Paraguay
20 June 2023
Clay

Bahamas
0

			1	2	3
1	(Paraguay) (The Bahamas)	Martin Antonio Vergara del Puerto; Denali Nottage	6; 3	5; 7	6; 2
2	(Paraguay) (The Bahamas)	Daniel Vallejo; Kevin Major	6; 4	6; 4
3	(Paraguay) (The Bahamas)	Daniel Vallejo / Martin Antonio Vergara del Puerto; Donte Armbrister / Marvin Rolle	6; 4	6; 2

==== Paraguay vs. Honduras ====
Paraguay
3
Club Internacional de Tenis, Asunción, Paraguay
21 June 2023
Clay

Honduras
0

			1	2	3
1	(Paraguay) (Honduras)	Martin Antonio Vergara del Puerto; Keny Turcios	6; 2			retired
2	(Paraguay) (Honduras)	Daniel Vallejo; Alejandro Obando	6; 1	6; 3
3	(Paraguay) (Honduras)	Thiago Drozdowski / Hernando Jose Escurra Isnardi; Guillermo Alfonso Bennaton / Mario Richmagui	6; 2	6; 1

==== Costa Rica vs. Bahamas ====
Costa Rica
3
Club Internacional de Tenis, Asunción, Paraguay
21 June 2023
Clay

Bahamas
0

			1	2	3
1	(Costa Rica) (The Bahamas)	Rodrigo Crespo Piedra; Denali Nottage	6; 4	6; 2
2	(Costa Rica) (The Bahamas)	Jesse Flores; Kevin Major	6^{5} 7^{7}	7^{10} 6^{8}	6; 0
3	(Costa Rica) (The Bahamas)	Luca Lo Nardo / Pablo Nunez; Donte Armbrister / Marvin Rolle	6; 2	6; 2

==== Dominican Republic vs. Costa Rica ====
Dominican Republic
1
Club Internacional de Tenis, Asunción, Paraguay
22 June 2023
Clay

Costa Rica
2

			1	2	3
1	(Dominican Republic) (Costa Rica)	Alejandro Jose Gandini; Rodrigo Crespo Piedra	3; 6	5; 7
2	(Dominican Republic) (Costa Rica)	Peter Bertran; Jesse Flores	5; 7	3; 6
3	(Dominican Republic) (Costa Rica)	Peter Bertran / Alejandro Jose Gandini; Luca Lo Nardo / Pablo Nunez	6; 0	6; 4

==== Bahamas vs. Honduras ====
Bahamas
3
Club Internacional de Tenis, Asunción, Paraguay
22 June 2023
Clay

Honduras
0

			1	2	3
1	(The Bahamas) (Honduras)	Denali Nottage; Guillermo Alfonso Bennaton	4; 6	6; 3	6; 3
2	(The Bahamas) (Honduras)	Kevin Major; Alejandro Obando	6; 2	6; 0
3	(The Bahamas) (Honduras)	Donte Armbrister / Marvin Rolle; Alejandro Obando / Mario Richmagui	7^{7} 6^{3}	6; 4

==== Dominican Republic vs. Paraguay ====
Dominican Republic
1
Club Internacional de Tenis, Asunción, Paraguay
23 June 2023
Clay

Paraguay
2

			1	2	3
1	(Dominican Republic) (Paraguay)	Alejandro Jose Gandini; Martin Antonio Vergara del Puerto	3; 6	0; 6
2	(Dominican Republic) (Paraguay)	Peter Bertran; Daniel Vallejo	2; 6	2; 6
3	(Dominican Republic) (Paraguay)	Peter Bertran / Alejandro Jose Gandini; Thiago Drozdowski / Hernando Jose Escurra Isnardi	6; 4	6; 2

==== Costa Rica vs. Honduras ====
Costa Rica
2
Club Internacional de Tenis, Asunción, Paraguay
23 June 2023
Clay

Honduras
1

			1	2	3
1	(Costa Rica) (Honduras)	Rodrigo Crespo Piedra; Mario Richmagui	6; 2	6; 2
2	(Costa Rica) (Honduras)	Jesse Flores; Alejandro Obando	6; 2	6; 2
3	(Costa Rica) (Honduras)	Luca Lo Nardo / Pablo Nunez; Guillermo Alfonso Bennaton / Alejandro Obando	6; 1	5; 7	3; 6

== Play-offs ==
=== First place play-off ===
==== Bolivia vs. Paraguay ====
Bolivia
1
Club Internacional de Tenis, Asunción, Paraguay
24 June 2023
Clay

Paraguay
2

			1	2	3
1	(Bolivia) (Paraguay)	Raúl García; Martin Antonio Vergara del Puerto	7^{9} 6^{7}	3; 6	6; 3
2	(Bolivia) (Paraguay)	Juan Carlos Prado Ángelo; Daniel Vallejo	6^{5} 7^{7}	6^{4} 7^{7}
3	(Bolivia) (Paraguay)	Raúl García / Juan Carlos Prado Ángelo] Daniel Vallejo / Martin Antonio Vergara del Puerto	1; 6			retired

=== Promotional play-off ===
==== Costa Rica vs. Venezuela ====
Costa Rica
2
Club Internacional de Tenis, Asunción, Paraguay
24 June 2023
Clay

Venezuela
0

			1	2	3
1	(Costa Rica) (Venezuela)	Rodrigo Crespo Piedra; Rafael Abdul Salam	6; 1	6; 2
2	(Costa Rica) (Venezuela)	Jesse Flores; Ricardo Rodríguez-Pace	6; 2	7; 5
3	(Costa Rica) (Venezuela)	Jesse Flores / Pablo Nunez; Juan José Bianchi / Ricardo Rodríguez-Pace				not played

=== Fifth place play-off ===
==== Bermuda vs. Dominican Republic ====
Bermuda
2
Club Internacional de Tenis, Asunción, Paraguay
24 June 2023
Clay

Dominican Republic
1

			1	2	3
1	(Bermuda) (Dominican Republic)	Richard Mallory; Alberto Puello	6; 1	7; 5
2	(Bermuda) (Dominican Republic)	Daniel Phillips; Peter Bertran	2; 6	1; 6
3	(Bermuda) (Dominican Republic)	Richard Mallory / Daniel Phillips; Peter Bertran / Enmanuel Munoz	7^{7} 6^{4}	4; 6	6; 3

=== Relegation play-off ===
==== Panama vs. Bahamas ====
Panama
0
Club Internacional de Tenis, Asunción, Paraguay
24 June 2023
Clay

Bahamas
2

			1	2	3
1	(Panama) (The Bahamas)	Luis Ching; Denali Nottage	1; 6	3; 6
2	(Panama) (The Bahamas)	Luis Gómez; Kevin Major	3; 6	4; 6
3	(Panama) (The Bahamas)	Luis Ching / Chad Valdes; Donte Armbrister / Marvin Rolle				not played

== Final placements ==
Placing	Teams
Promoted/First	Paraguay
Promoted/Second	Bolivia
Promoted/Third	Costa Rica
Fourth	Venezuela
Fifth	Bermuda
Sixth	Dominican Republic
Seventh	Bahamas
Relegated/Eighth	Panama
Relegated/Ninth	Honduras

- Paraguay, Bolivia and Costa Rica were promoted to 2024 Davis Cup World Group II play-offs.
- Panama and Honduras were relegated to 2024 Davis Cup Americas Zone Group IV.
