= 2022 Davis Cup qualifying round =

Davis Cup round

The 2022 Davis Cup qualifying round was held on 4–5 March 2022. The twelve winners of this round qualify for the 2022 Davis Cup Finals while the twelve losers will qualify for the 2022 Davis Cup World Group I.

== Teams ==
Twenty-four teams played for twelve spots in the finals, in series decided on a home and away basis.

Twenty-six eligible teams are:

- 16 teams ranked 3rd–18th in the finals
- 8 winning teams from World Group I
- 2 winning teams from World Group I knock-out ties

Two wild cards for the finals selected from these 26 nations are Serbia and Great Britain. The remaining 24 nations will compete for 12 spots in the Finals.

The 12 winning teams from the play-offs will play at the finals and the 12 losing teams will play at the World Group I.

#: Nations Ranking as of 20 September 2021.

Qualified teams

- France (#1)
- Spain (#3)
- Belgium (#4)
- United States (#5)
- Canada (#6)
- Germany (#8)
- Italy (#9)
- Australia (#11)
- Kazakhstan (#12)
- Sweden (#14)
- Argentina (#15)
- Austria (#16)

- Japan (#17)
- Czech Republic (#18)
- Colombia (#19)
- Netherlands (#20)
- Hungary (#23)
- Ecuador (#24)
- Brazil (#26)
- South Korea (#27)
- Slovakia (#29)
- Finland (#32)
- Romania (#41)
- Norway (#44)

== Results summary ==
Home team	Score	Away team	Location	Venue	Surface
France [1]	4–0	Ecuador	Pau	Palais des Sports	Hard (i)
Spain [2]	3–1	Romania	Marbella	Club de Tenis Puente Romano	Clay
Finland	2–3	Belgium [3]	Espoo	Espoo Metro Areena	Hard (i)
United States [4]	4–0	Colombia	Reno	Reno Events Center	Hard (i)
Netherlands	4–0	Canada [5]	The Hague	Sportcampus Zuiderpark	Clay (i)
Brazil	1–3	Germany [6]	Rio de Janeiro	Olympic Tennis Centre	Clay
Slovakia	2–3	Italy [7]	Bratislava	AXA Aréna NTC	Hard (i)
Australia [8]	3–2	Hungary	Sydney	Ken Rosewall Arena	Hard
Norway	1–3	Kazakhstan [9]	Oslo	Oslo Tennis Arena	Hard (i)
Sweden [10]	3–2	Japan	Helsingborg	Helsingborg Arena	Hard (i)
Argentina [11]	4–0	Czech Republic	Buenos Aires	Lawn Tennis Club	Clay
South Korea	3–1	Austria [12]	Seoul	Olympic Park Tennis Center	Hard (i)

== Qualifying round results ==
=== France vs. Ecuador ===
France
4
Palais des Sports, Pau, France
4–5 March 2022
Hard (i)

Ecuador
0

			1	2	3
1	(France) (Ecuador)	Arthur Rinderknech; Emilio Gómez	6; 2	7; 5
2	(France) (Ecuador)	Adrian Mannarino; Roberto Quiroz	6; 4	4; 6	6; 1
3	(France) (Ecuador)	Pierre-Hugues Herbert / Nicolas Mahut; Gonzalo Escobar / Diego Hidalgo	6; 3	7; 5
4	(France) (Ecuador)	Benjamin Bonzi; Antonio Cayetano March	6; 0	6; 2
5	(France) (Ecuador)	Arthur Rinderknech; Roberto Quiroz				not played

=== Spain vs. Romania ===
Spain
3
Club de Tenis Puente Romano, Marbella, Spain
4–5 March 2022
Clay

Romania
1

			1	2	3
1	(Spain) (Romania)	Roberto Bautista Agut; Gabi Adrian Boitan	6; 3	6; 1
2	(Spain) (Romania)	Carlos Alcaraz; Marius Copil	6; 4	6; 3
3	(Spain) (Romania)	Alejandro Davidovich Fokina / Pedro Martínez; Marius Copil / Horia Tecău	6^{2} 7^{7}	4; 6
4	(Spain) (Romania)	Roberto Bautista Agut; Marius Copil	6; 2	6; 3
5	(Spain) (Romania)	Carlos Alcaraz; Gabi Adrian Boitan				not played

=== Finland vs. Belgium ===
Finland
2
Espoo Metro Areena, Espoo, Finland
4–5 March 2022
Hard (i)

Belgium
3

			1	2	3
1	(Finland) (Belgium)	Otto Virtanen; David Goffin	5; 7	6; 3	3; 6
2	(Finland) (Belgium)	Emil Ruusuvuori; Zizou Bergs	6; 3	7; 5
3	(Finland) (Belgium)	Harri Heliövaara / Emil Ruusuvuori; Sander Gillé / David Goffin	6; 3	2; 6	7^{7} 6^{5}
4	(Finland) (Belgium)	Emil Ruusuvuori; David Goffin	4; 6	2; 6
5	(Finland) (Belgium)	Otto Virtanen; Zizou Bergs	4; 6	0; 6

=== United States vs. Colombia ===
United States
4
Reno Events Center, Reno, United States
4–5 March 2022
Hard (i)

Colombia
0

			1	2	3
1	(United States) (Colombia)	Sebastian Korda; Nicolás Mejía	6; 4	1; 6	6; 4
2	(United States) (Colombia)	Taylor Fritz; Alejandro González	6; 1	6; 0
3	(United States) (Colombia)	Rajeev Ram / Jack Sock; Nicolás Barrientos / Juan Sebastián Cabal	6; 3	6; 4
4	(United States) (Colombia)	Tommy Paul; Nicolás Mejía	7; 5	7^{7} 6^{4}
5	(United States) (Colombia)	Sebastian Korda; Alejandro González				not played

=== Netherlands vs. Canada ===
Netherlands
4
Sportcampus Zuiderpark, The Hague, Netherlands
4–5 March 2022
Clay (i)

Canada
0

			1	2	3
1	(Netherlands) (Canada)	Botic van de Zandschulp; Alexis Galarneau	7; 5	7^{11} 6^{9}
2	(Netherlands) (Canada)	Tallon Griekspoor; Steven Diez	6; 4	6; 4
3	(Netherlands) (Canada)	Wesley Koolhof / Matwé Middelkoop; Peter Polansky / Brayden Schnur	7; 5	6; 3
4	(Netherlands) (Canada)	Robin Haase; Steven Diez	6; 1	6; 2
5	(Netherlands) (Canada)	Tallon Griekspoor; Alexis Galarneau				not played

=== Brazil vs. Germany ===
Brazil
1
Olympic Tennis Centre, Rio de Janeiro, Brazil
4–5 March 2022
Clay

Germany
3

			1	2	3
1	(Brazil) (Germany)	Thiago Seyboth Wild; Alexander Zverev	4; 6	2; 6
2	(Brazil) (Germany)	Thiago Monteiro; Jan-Lennard Struff	6; 3	1; 6	6; 3
3	(Brazil) (Germany)	Felipe Meligeni Alves / Bruno Soares; Kevin Krawietz / Tim Pütz	6; 4	6^{4} 7^{7}	4; 6
4	(Brazil) (Germany)	Thiago Monteiro; Alexander Zverev	1; 6	5; 7
5	(Brazil) (Germany)	Thiago Seyboth Wild; Jan-Lennard Struff				not played

=== Slovakia vs. Italy ===
Slovakia
2
AXA Aréna NTC, Bratislava, Slovakia
4–5 March 2022
Hard (i)

Italy
3

			1	2	3
1	(Slovakia) (Italy)	Norbert Gombos; Jannik Sinner	4; 6	6; 4	4; 6
2	(Slovakia) (Italy)	Filip Horanský; Lorenzo Sonego	7^{7} 6^{2}	6; 3
3	(Slovakia) (Italy)	Filip Polášek / Igor Zelenay; Simone Bolelli / Jannik Sinner	6; 3	1; 6	7^{7} 6^{3}
4	(Slovakia) (Italy)	Filip Horanský; Jannik Sinner	5; 7	4; 6
5	(Slovakia) (Italy)	Norbert Gombos; Lorenzo Musetti	7^{7} 6^{3}	2; 6	4; 6

=== Australia vs. Hungary ===
Australia
3
Ken Rosewall Arena, Sydney, Australia
4–5 March 2022
Hard

Hungary
2

			1	2	3
1	(Australia) (Hungary)	Alex de Minaur; Zsombor Piros	7; 5	6; 2
2	(Australia) (Hungary)	Thanasi Kokkinakis; Márton Fucsovics	6^{4} 7^{7}	6; 1	3; 6
3	(Australia) (Hungary)	John Peers / Luke Saville; Fábián Marozsán / Máté Valkusz	4; 6	4; 6
4	(Australia) (Hungary)	Alex de Minaur; Márton Fucsovics	7^{7} 6^{4}	6; 4
5	(Australia) (Hungary)	Thanasi Kokkinakis; Zsombor Piros	6; 4	6; 4

=== Norway vs. Kazakhstan ===
Norway
1
Oslo Tennis Arena, Oslo, Norway
4–5 March 2022
Hard (i)

Kazakhstan
3

			1	2	3
1	(Norway) (Kazakhstan)	Casper Ruud; Mikhail Kukushkin	6; 1	6; 4
2	(Norway) (Kazakhstan)	Viktor Durasovic; Alexander Bublik	3; 6	2; 6
3	(Norway) (Kazakhstan)	Simen Sunde Bratholm / Viktor Durasovic; Andrey Golubev / Aleksandr Nedovyesov	6^{10} 7^{12}	3; 6
4	(Norway) (Kazakhstan)	Casper Ruud; Alexander Bublik	4; 6	7; 5	4; 6
5	(Norway) (Kazakhstan)	Viktor Durasovic; Mikhail Kukushkin				not played

=== Sweden vs. Japan ===
Sweden
3
Helsingborg Arena, Helsingborg, Sweden
4–5 March 2022
Hard (i)

Japan
2

			1	2	3
1	(Sweden) (Japan)	Dragoș Nicolae Mădăraș; Yosuke Watanuki	4; 6	4; 6
2	(Sweden) (Japan)	Elias Ymer; Taro Daniel	7; 5	6; 4
3	(Sweden) (Japan)	André Göransson / Elias Ymer; Ben McLachlan / Yasutaka Uchiyama	2; 6	7^{9} 6^{7}	7; 5
4	(Sweden) (Japan)	Dragoș Nicolae Mădăraș; Taro Daniel	0; 6	5; 7
5	(Sweden) (Japan)	Elias Ymer; Yosuke Watanuki	6; 3	6; 3

=== Argentina vs. Czech Republic ===
Argentina
4
Lawn Tennis Club, Buenos Aires, Argentina
4–5 March 2022
Clay

Czech Republic
0

			1	2	3
1	(Argentina) (Czech Republic)	Sebastián Báez; Jiří Lehečka	7^{7} 6^{4}	6; 3
2	(Argentina) (Czech Republic)	Diego Schwartzman; Tomáš Macháč	2; 6	6; 2	6; 3
3	(Argentina) (Czech Republic)	Máximo González / Horacio Zeballos; Jiří Lehečka / Tomáš Macháč	6; 4	6; 4
4	(Argentina) (Czech Republic)	Federico Coria; Vít Kopřiva	6; 2	6; 4
5	(Argentina) (Czech Republic)	Diego Schwartzman; Jiří Lehečka				not played

=== South Korea vs. Austria ===
South Korea
3
Olympic Park Tennis Center, Seoul, South Korea
4–5 March 2022
Hard (i)

Austria
1

			1	2	3
1	(South Korea) (Austria)	Nam Ji-sung; Dennis Novak	1; 6	4; 6
2	(South Korea) (Austria)	Kwon Soon-woo; Jurij Rodionov	7; 5	6; 4
3	(South Korea) (Austria)	Nam Ji-sung / Song Min-kyu; Alexander Erler / Lucas Miedler	6; 4	6; 3
4	(South Korea) (Austria)	Kwon Soon-woo; Dennis Novak	7; 5	7; 5
5	(South Korea) (Austria)	Nam Ji-sung; Jurij Rodionov				not played
