= 2022 Davis Cup Finals =

Men's tennis event

- Date: 13 September – 27 November 2022
- Edition: 3rd
- Draw: 16 teams
- Surface: Hard indoor
- Location: Bologna, Italy; Glasgow, Great Britain; Hamburg, Germany; Valencia, Spain; Málaga, Spain
- Venue: Unipol Arena; Emirates Arena; Am Rothenbaum; Pavelló Municipal Font de Sant Lluís; Martin Carpena Arena

Champions
- Canada
- Davis Cup

Canada won the title, defeating Australia 2–0 in the final. It was Canada's first ever Davis Cup title.

The Finals, formerly known as World Group, was the highest level of Davis Cup competition in 2022. It took place from 13 to 18 September and from 22 to 27 November 2022. The ties were contested in a best-of-three rubbers format and played on one day. There were two singles followed by a doubles. The Russian Tennis Federation were the defending champions, but they were banned from competing in international events following the 2022 Russian invasion of Ukraine. On 13 March 2022, ITF announced that Serbia, which had been awarded a wild card for the 2022 Finals, had replaced the Russian Tennis Federation as the highest-ranked losing semi-finalist in the 2021 Finals. On 17 March 2022, ITF announced that Canada will compete in the Finals as the replacement wild card.

== Participating teams ==
16 nations took part in the Finals. The qualification was as follows:

- 1 finalist from the previous edition (Croatia, defending champion Russia was suspended)
- 1 highest-ranked losing semi-finalist from the previous edition (announced by ITF on 13 March 2022 as Serbia to replace Russia)
- 2 wild card teams (Canada and Great Britain)
- 12 winners of the qualifying round, in March 2022

=== Overview ===
- Argentina
- Australia
- Belgium
- Canada (WC)
- Croatia (2021F)
- France
- Germany
- Great Britain (WC)
- Italy
- Kazakhstan
- Netherlands
- Serbia (2021SF)
- South Korea
- Spain (host)
- Sweden
- United States

Notes

- TH = Title holder
- WC = Wild card
- 2021F = Finalist from the 2021 tournament
- 2021SF = Highest-ranked losing semi-finalist from the 2021 tournament

=== Seeds ===
The seedings were based on the Davis Cup Ranking of 7 March 2022. Croatia, as runners-up in 2021, were seeded No. 1, with Spain, France and USA also seeded based on the latest Davis Cup nations ranking. The remaining 12 nations were distributed in Pots 2–4 according to the latest Davis Cup nations ranking. Four host nations, Germany, Great Britain, Italy and Spain were placed in different groups.

1. Croatia
2. Spain
3. France
4. United States
5. Germany
6. Canada
7. Italy
8. Great Britain
9. Kazakhstan
10. Belgium
11. Serbia
12. Argentina
13. Sweden
14. Australia
15. Netherlands
16. South Korea

== Team nominations ==
SR = Singles ranking, DR = Doubles ranking.

=== Group stage ===
Rankings are as of 12 September 2022.

==== Group A ====
Argentina
Player	SR	DR
D Schwartzman	17	114
F Cerúndolo	27	294
S Báez	37	1249
H Zeballos	–	11
M González	–	51
Captain: Guillermo Coria

| class="col-break " style=" padding-left: 2em;" |

Croatia
Player	SR	DR
B Ćorić	26	–
B Gojo	164	599
N Serdarušić	278	392
M Pavić	–	9
N Mektić	–	10
Captain: Vedran Martić

| class="col-break " style=" padding-left: 2em;" |

Italy
Player	SR	DR
J Sinner	11	789
M Berrettini	15	783
L Musetti	30	549
F Fognini	55	28
S Bolelli	–	23
Captain: Filippo Volandri

| class="col-break " style=" padding-left: 2em;" |

Sweden
Player	SR	DR
M Ymer	98	783
E Ymer	119	401
DN Mădăraș	292	657
J Mridha	538	1457
A Göransson	–	68
Captain: Johan Hedsberg

==== Group B ====
Canada
Player	SR	DR
F Auger-Aliassime	13	194
V Pospisil	141	–
A Galarneau	247	373
G Diallo	334	1746
Captain: Frank Dancevic

| class="col-break " style=" padding-left: 2em;" |

Serbia
Player	SR	DR
M Kecmanović	33	173
F Krajinović	41	400
L Đere	66	–
D Lajović	92	547
N Ćaćić	–	62
Captain: Viktor Troicki

| class="col-break " style=" padding-left: 2em;" |

South Korea
Player	SR	DR
S Kwon	74	290
S Hong	467	383
J Nam	542	234
M Song	1783	223
Captain: Seungkyu Park

| class="col-break " style=" padding-left: 2em;" |

Spain
Player	SR	DR
C Alcaraz	1	543
R Bautista Agut	21	–
A Ramos Viñolas	40	317
P Martínez	67	76
M Granollers	–	12
Captain: Sergi Bruguera

==== Group C ====
Australia
Player	SR	DR
A de Minaur	22	186
T Kokkinakis	81	20
J Kubler	97	216
M Purcell	226	37
M Ebden	657	33
Captain: Lleyton Hewitt

| class="col-break " style=" padding-left: 2em;" |

Belgium
Player	SR	DR
D Goffin	62	1106
Z Bergs	134	952
M Geerts	268	226
S Gillé	–	78
J Vliegen	–	90
Captain: Johan Van Herck

| class="col-break " style=" padding-left: 2em;" |

France
Player	SR	DR
A Mannarino	47	232
B Bonzi	53	122
A Rinderknech	59	144
R Gasquet	79	–
N Mahut	–	27
Captain: Sébastien Grosjean

| class="col-break " style=" padding-left: 2em;" |

Germany
Player	SR	DR
O Otte	52	390
JL Struff	132	136
Y Hanfmann	153	483
T Pütz	–	8
K Krawietz	–	29
Captain: Michael Kohlmann

==== Group D ====
Great Britain
Player	SR	DR
C Norrie	8	152
D Evans	25	94
A Murray	43	–
J Salisbury	–	1
N Skupski	–	3
Captain: Leon Smith

| class="col-break " style=" padding-left: 2em;" |

Kazakhstan
Player	SR	DR
A Bublik	44	160
M Kukushkin	221	839
D Popko	227	331
A Nedovyesov	1165	58
A Golubev	–	50
Captain: Yuri Schukin

| class="col-break " style=" padding-left: 2em;" |

Netherlands
Player	SR	DR
B van de Zandschulp	35	214
T Griekspoor	48	518
T van Rijthoven	107	292
W Koolhof	–	4
M Middelkoop	–	24
Captain: Paul Haarhuis

| class="col-break " style=" padding-left: 2em;" |

United States
Player	SR	DR
T Fritz	12	127
T Paul	29	97
J Sock	128	43
R Ram	–	2
Captain: Bob Bryan

=== Knockout stage ===
Rankings are as of 21 November 2022.

Australia
Player	SR	DR
A de Minaur	24	198
J Thompson	84	466
T Kokkinakis	95	15
M Purcell	221	33
M Ebden	741	26
Captain: Lleyton Hewitt

| class="col-break " style=" padding-left: 2em;" |

Canada
Player	SR	DR
F Auger-Aliassime	6	258
D Shapovalov	18	75
V Pospisil	100	–
A Galarneau	204	411
G Diallo	224	1826
Captain: Frank Dancevic

| class="col-break " style=" padding-left: 2em;" |

Croatia
Player	SR	DR
M Čilić	17	–
B Ćorić	26	–
B Gojo	145	1265
M Pavić	–	5
N Mektić	–	8
Captain: Vedran Martić

| class="col-break " style=" padding-left: 2em;" |

Germany
Player	SR	DR
O Otte	65	234
Y Hanfmann	131	566
JL Struff	152	139
T Pütz	–	18
K Krawietz	–	25
Captain: Michael Kohlmann

Italy
Player	SR	DR
M Berrettini	16	827
L Musetti	23	573
L Sonego	45	64
F Fognini	56	23
S Bolelli	–	21
Captain: Filippo Volandri

| class="col-break " style=" padding-left: 2em;" |

Netherlands
Player	SR	DR
B van de Zandschulp	35	121
T Griekspoor	96	217
T van Rijthoven	115	543
W Koolhof	–	1
M Middelkoop	–	22
Captain: Paul Haarhuis

| class="col-break " style=" padding-left: 2em;" |

Spain
Player	SR	DR
P Carreño Busta	13	323
R Bautista Agut	21	–
A Ramos Viñolas	39	325
P Martínez	62	78
M Granollers	–	17
Captain: Sergi Bruguera

| class="col-break " style=" padding-left: 2em;" |

United States
Player	SR	DR
T Fritz	9	142
F Tiafoe	19	233
T Paul	33	109
J Sock	132	43
Captain: Mardy Fish

== Format ==
The 16 teams were divided into four round robin groups of four teams each. The top two teams in each group qualified for the quarterfinals.

== Group stage ==
Qualified for the Knockout stage
Eliminated

=== Overview ===
G = Group, T = Ties, M = Matches, S = Sets, H = Hosts

G	Winner				Runner-up				Third				Fourth			
G	Nation	T	M	S	Nation	T	M	S	Nation	T	M	S	Nation	T	M	S
A	Italy (H)	3–0	7–2	16–7	Croatia	2–1	5–4	12–10	Sweden	1–2	4–5	10–12	Argentina	0–3	2–7	7–16
B	Spain (H)	2–1	7–2	16–8	Canada	2–1	5–4	11–12	Serbia	2–1	4–5	10–10	South Korea	0–3	2–7	7–14
C	Germany (H)	3–0	6–3	13–9	Australia	2–1	6–3	12–8	France	1–2	4–5	12–10	Belgium	0–3	2–7	6–16
D	Netherlands	3–0	6–3	14–9	United States	2–1	5–4	11–12	Great Britain (H)	1–2	4–5	11–12	Kazakhstan	0–3	3–6	10–13

=== Group A ===
Pos.	Country	Ties	Matches	Sets	Sets %	Games	Games %
1	Italy	3–0	7–2	16–7	70%	125–98	56%
2	Croatia	2–1	5–4	12–10	55%	110–108	50%
3	Sweden	1–2	4–5	10–12	45%	104-109	49%
4	Argentina	0–3	2–7	7–16	30%	96–120	44%

==== Argentina vs. Sweden ====
Argentina
1
Unipol Arena, Bologna
13 September 2022

Sweden
2

			1	2	3
1	(Argentina) (Sweden)	Sebastián Báez; Elias Ymer	4; 6	6; 3	6^{4} 7^{7}
2	(Argentina) (Sweden)	Diego Schwartzman; Mikael Ymer	2; 6	2; 6
3	(Argentina) (Sweden)	Máximo González / Horacio Zeballos; André Göransson / Elias Ymer	3; 6	6; 3	6; 2

==== Italy vs. Croatia ====
Italy
3
Unipol Arena, Bologna
14 September 2022

Croatia
0

			1	2	3
1	(Italy) (Croatia)	Lorenzo Musetti; Borna Gojo	6; 4	6; 2
2	(Italy) (Croatia)	Matteo Berrettini; Borna Ćorić	6^{4} 7^{7}	6; 2	6; 1
3	(Italy) (Croatia)	Simone Bolelli / Fabio Fognini; Nikola Mektić / Mate Pavić	3; 6	7; 5	7^{7} 6^{3}

==== Croatia vs. Sweden ====
Croatia
2
Unipol Arena, Bologna
15 September 2022

Sweden
1

			1	2	3
1	(Croatia) (Sweden)	Borna Gojo; Elias Ymer	2; 6	6^{2} 7^{7}
2	(Croatia) (Sweden)	Borna Ćorić; Mikael Ymer	6; 4	3; 6	6; 3
3	(Croatia) (Sweden)	Nikola Mektić / Mate Pavić; Mikael Ymer / Elias Ymer	7; 5	6; 3

==== Italy vs. Argentina ====
Italy
2
Unipol Arena, Bologna
16 September 2022

Argentina
1

			1	2	3
1	(Italy) (Argentina)	Matteo Berrettini; Sebastián Báez	6; 2	6; 3
2	(Italy) (Argentina)	Jannik Sinner; Francisco Cerúndolo	7; 5	1; 6	6; 3
3	(Italy) (Argentina)	Simone Bolelli / Fabio Fognini; Máximo González / Horacio Zeballos	5; 7	6; 2	3; 6

==== Argentina vs. Croatia ====
Argentina
0
Unipol Arena, Bologna
17 September 2022

Croatia
3

			1	2	3
1	(Argentina) (Croatia)	Sebastián Báez; Borna Gojo	1; 6	6; 3	3; 6
2	(Argentina) (Croatia)	Francisco Cerúndolo; Borna Ćorić	4; 6	6^{6} 7^{8}
3	(Argentina) (Croatia)	Máximo González / Horacio Zeballos; Nikola Mektić / Mate Pavić	2; 6	5; 7

==== Italy vs. Sweden ====
Italy
2
Unipol Arena, Bologna
18 September 2022

Sweden
1

			1	2	3
1	(Italy) (Sweden)	Matteo Berrettini; Elias Ymer	6; 4	6; 4
2	(Italy) (Sweden)	Jannik Sinner; Mikael Ymer	4; 6	6; 3	3; 6
3	(Italy) (Sweden)	Simone Bolelli / Fabio Fognini; André Göransson / Dragoș Nicolae Mădăraș	7^{7} 6^{1}	6; 2

=== Group B ===
Pos.	Country	Ties	Matches	Sets	Sets %	Games	Games %
1	Spain	2–1	7–2	16–8	67%	132–113	54%
2	Canada	2–1	5–4	11–12	48%	108–115	48%
3	Serbia	2–1	4–5	10–10	50%	101–88	53%
4	South Korea	0–3	2–7	7–14	33%	90–115	44%

==== South Korea vs. Canada ====
South Korea
1
Pavelló Municipal Font de Sant Lluís, Valencia
13 September 2022

Canada
2

			1	2	3
1	(South Korea) (Canada)	Hong Seong-chan; Vasek Pospisil	6; 4	1; 6	6^{5} 7^{7}
2	(South Korea) (Canada)	Kwon Soon-woo; Félix Auger-Aliassime	7^{7} 6^{5}	6; 3
3	(South Korea) (Canada)	Nam Ji-sung / Song Min-kyu; Félix Auger-Aliassime / Vasek Pospisil	5; 7	7; 5	3; 6

==== Spain vs. Serbia ====
Spain
3
Pavelló Municipal Font de Sant Lluís, Valencia
14 September 2022

Serbia
0

			1	2	3
1	(Spain) (Serbia)	Albert Ramos Viñolas; Laslo Đere	2; 6	7^{7} 6^{5}	7; 5
2	(Spain) (Serbia)	Roberto Bautista Agut; Miomir Kecmanović	7^{7} 6^{5}	7^{7} 6^{5}
3	(Spain) (Serbia)	Marcel Granollers / Pedro Martínez; Nikola Ćaćić / Dušan Lajović	6^{5} 7^{7}	6; 2	6; 2

==== South Korea vs. Serbia ====
South Korea
1
Pavelló Municipal Font de Sant Lluís, Valencia
15 September 2022

Serbia
2

			1	2	3
1	(South Korea) (Serbia)	Hong Seong-chan; Dušan Lajović	4; 6	0; 6
2	(South Korea) (Serbia)	Kwon Soon-woo; Miomir Kecmanović	3; 6	4; 6
3	(South Korea) (Serbia)	Nam Ji-sung / Song Min-kyu; Nikola Ćaćić / Filip Krajinović	6; 4	6; 2

==== Spain vs. Canada ====
Spain
1
Pavelló Municipal Font de Sant Lluís, Valencia
16 September 2022

Canada
2

			1	2	3
1	(Spain) (Canada)	Roberto Bautista Agut; Vasek Pospisil	3; 6	6; 3	6; 3
2	(Spain) (Canada)	Carlos Alcaraz; Félix Auger-Aliassime	7^{7} 6^{3}	4; 6	2; 6
3	(Spain) (Canada)	Marcel Granollers / Pedro Martínez; Félix Auger-Aliassime / Vasek Pospisil	6; 4	4; 6	5; 7

==== Serbia vs. Canada ====
Serbia
2
Pavelló Municipal Font de Sant Lluís, Valencia
17 September 2022

Canada
1

			1	2	3
1	(Serbia) (Canada)	Laslo Đere; Gabriel Diallo	6; 2	6; 2
2	(Serbia) (Canada)	Miomir Kecmanović; Félix Auger-Aliassime	3; 6	4; 6
3	(Serbia) (Canada)	Miomir Kecmanović / Filip Krajinović; Alexis Galarneau / Vasek Pospisil	2; 1			retired

Note: Kecmanović/Krajinović's retirement victory over Galarneau/Pospisil counted as a 6–1, 6–0 win.

==== Spain vs. South Korea ====
Spain
3
Pavelló Municipal Font de Sant Lluís, Valencia
18 September 2022

South Korea
0

			1	2	3
1	(Spain) (South Korea)	Roberto Bautista Agut; Hong Seong-chan	6; 1	6; 3
2	(Spain) (South Korea)	Carlos Alcaraz; Kwon Soon-woo	6; 4	7^{7} 6^{1}
3	(Spain) (South Korea)	Marcel Granollers / Pedro Martínez; Nam Ji-sung / Song Min-kyu	7; 5	3; 6	6; 1

=== Group C ===
Pos.	Country	Ties	Matches	Sets	Sets %	Games	Games %
1	Germany	3–0	6–3	13–9	59%	115–108	52%
2	Australia	2–1	6–3	12–8	60%	95–86	52%
3	France	1–2	4–5	12–10	55%	112–101	53%
4	Belgium	0–3	2–7	6–16	27%	93–120	44%

==== Belgium vs. Australia ====
Belgium
0
Am Rothenbaum, Hamburg
13 September 2022

Australia
3

			1	2	3
1	(Belgium) (Australia)	Zizou Bergs; Jason Kubler	4; 6	6; 1	3; 6
2	(Belgium) (Australia)	David Goffin; Alex de Minaur	2; 6	2; 6
3	(Belgium) (Australia)	Sander Gillé / Joran Vliegen; Matthew Ebden / Max Purcell	1; 6	3; 6

==== France vs. Germany ====
France
1
Am Rothenbaum, Hamburg
14 September 2022

Germany
2

			1	2	3
1	(France) (Germany)	Benjamin Bonzi; Jan-Lennard Struff	4; 6	6; 2	5; 7
2	(France) (Germany)	Adrian Mannarino; Oscar Otte	6; 4	6; 3
3	(France) (Germany)	Nicolas Mahut / Arthur Rinderknech; Kevin Krawietz / Tim Pütz	2; 6	6; 3	6^{1} 7^{7}

==== France vs. Australia ====
France
1
Am Rothenbaum, Hamburg
15 September 2022

Australia
2

			1	2	3
1	(France) (Australia)	Richard Gasquet; Jason Kubler	6; 2	6; 4
2	(France) (Australia)	Benjamin Bonzi; Alex de Minaur	3; 6	6; 1	4; 6
3	(France) (Australia)	Nicolas Mahut / Arthur Rinderknech; Matthew Ebden / Max Purcell	4; 6	4; 6

==== Germany vs. Belgium ====
Germany
2
Am Rothenbaum, Hamburg
16 September 2022

Belgium
1

			1	2	3
1	(Germany) (Belgium)	Jan-Lennard Struff; Zizou Bergs	6; 4	7^{11} 6^{9}
2	(Germany) (Belgium)	Oscar Otte; David Goffin	6; 3	6^{7} 7^{9}	3; 6
3	(Germany) (Belgium)	Kevin Krawietz / Tim Pütz; Sander Gillé / Joran Vliegen	4; 6	6; 2	7^{7} 6^{5}

==== France vs. Belgium ====
France
2
Am Rothenbaum, Hamburg
17 September 2022

Belgium
1

			1	2	3
1	(France) (Belgium)	Richard Gasquet; Michael Geerts	6; 3	6; 3
2	(France) (Belgium)	Benjamin Bonzi; David Goffin	3; 6	7; 5	3; 6
3	(France) (Belgium)	Nicolas Mahut / Arthur Rinderknech; Sander Gillé / Joran Vliegen	6; 3	7^{8} 6^{6}

==== Germany vs. Australia ====
Germany
2
Am Rothenbaum, Hamburg
18 September 2022

Australia
1

			1	2	3
1	(Germany) (Australia)	Jan-Lennard Struff; Max Purcell	6; 1	7; 5
2	(Germany) (Australia)	Oscar Otte; Thanasi Kokkinakis	6^{6} 7^{8}	1; 6
3	(Germany) (Australia)	Kevin Krawietz / Tim Pütz; Matthew Ebden / Max Purcell	6; 4	6; 4

=== Group D ===
Pos.	Country	Ties	Matches	Sets	Sets %	Games	Games %
1	Netherlands	3–0	6–3	14–9	61%	125–106	54%
2	United States	2–1	5–4	11–12	48%	123–122	50%
3	Great Britain	1–2	4–5	11–12	48%	119–128	48%
4	Kazakhstan	0–3	3–6	10–13	43%	105–116	48%

==== Kazakhstan vs. Netherlands ====
Kazakhstan
1
Emirates Arena, Glasgow
13 September 2022

Netherlands
2

			1	2	3
1	(Kazakhstan) (Netherlands)	Mikhail Kukushkin; Tallon Griekspoor	1; 6	6; 3	3; 6
2	(Kazakhstan) (Netherlands)	Alexander Bublik; Botic van de Zandschulp	6; 3	1; 6	4; 6
3	(Kazakhstan) (Netherlands)	Alexander Bublik / Aleksandr Nedovyesov; Wesley Koolhof / Matwé Middelkoop	6; 4	1; 6	6; 3

==== United States vs. Great Britain ====
United States
2
Emirates Arena, Glasgow
14 September 2022

Great Britain
1

			1	2	3
1	(United States) (United Kingdom)	Tommy Paul; Dan Evans	6; 4	4; 6	6; 4
2	(United States) (United Kingdom)	Taylor Fritz; Cameron Norrie	6; 2	6^{2} 7^{7}	5; 7
3	(United States) (United Kingdom)	Rajeev Ram / Jack Sock; Andy Murray / Joe Salisbury	5; 7	6; 4	7; 5

==== United States vs. Kazakhstan ====
United States
2
Emirates Arena, Glasgow
15 September 2022

Kazakhstan
1

			1	2	3
1	(United States) (Kazakhstan)	Tommy Paul; Mikhail Kukushkin	6; 1	6; 4
2	(United States) (Kazakhstan)	Taylor Fritz; Alexander Bublik	7^{7} 6^{5}	1; 6	6; 3
3	(United States) (Kazakhstan)	Rajeev Ram / Jack Sock; Alexander Bublik / Aleksandr Nedovyesov	2; 6	6^{6} 7^{8}

==== Great Britain vs. Netherlands ====
Great Britain
1
Emirates Arena, Glasgow
16 September 2022

Netherlands
2

			1	2	3
1	(United Kingdom) (Netherlands)	Dan Evans; Tallon Griekspoor	6; 4	6; 4
2	(United Kingdom) (Netherlands)	Cameron Norrie; Botic van de Zandschulp	4; 6	2; 6
3	(United Kingdom) (Netherlands)	Andy Murray / Joe Salisbury; Wesley Koolhof / Matwé Middelkoop	6^{0} 7^{7}	7^{8} 6^{6}	3; 6

==== United States vs. Netherlands ====
United States
1
Emirates Arena, Glasgow
17 September 2022

Netherlands
2

			1	2	3
1	(United States) (Netherlands)	Tommy Paul; Tallon Griekspoor	5; 7	6^{3} 7^{7}
2	(United States) (Netherlands)	Taylor Fritz; Botic van de Zandschulp	4; 6	6^{3} 7^{7}
3	(United States) (Netherlands)	Rajeev Ram / Jack Sock; Wesley Koolhof / Matwé Middelkoop	4; 6	7^{7} 6^{3}	6; 4

==== Great Britain vs. Kazakhstan ====
Great Britain
2
Emirates Arena, Glasgow
18 September 2022

Kazakhstan
1

			1	2	3
1	(United Kingdom) (Kazakhstan)	Andy Murray; Dmitry Popko	6; 4	6; 3
2	(United Kingdom) (Kazakhstan)	Cameron Norrie; Alexander Bublik	4; 6	3; 6
3	(United Kingdom) (Kazakhstan)	Joe Salisbury / Neal Skupski; Alexander Bublik / Aleksandr Nedovyesov	7^{7} 6^{2}	6^{9} 7^{11}	7^{7} 6^{4}

== Knockout stage ==
=== Bracket ===
Quarterfinals
24 November, Málaga
Italy	2
United States	1
24 November, Málaga
Germany	1
Canada	2
22 November, Málaga
Netherlands	0
Australia	2
23 November, Málaga
Spain	0
Croatia	2

Semifinals
26 November, Málaga
Italy	1
Canada	2
25 November, Málaga
Australia	2
Croatia	1

Final
27 November, Málaga
Canada	2
Australia	0

=== Quarterfinals ===
==== Italy vs. United States ====
Italy
2
Martin Carpena Arena, Málaga
24 November 2022

United States
1

			1	2	3
1	(Italy) (United States)	Lorenzo Sonego; Frances Tiafoe	6; 3	7^{9} 6^{7}
2	(Italy) (United States)	Lorenzo Musetti; Taylor Fritz	6^{8} 7^{10}	3; 6
3	(Italy) (United States)	Simone Bolelli / Fabio Fognini; Tommy Paul / Jack Sock	6; 4	6; 4

==== Germany vs. Canada ====
Germany
1
Martin Carpena Arena, Málaga
24 November 2022

Canada
2

			1	2	3
1	(Germany) (Canada)	Jan-Lennard Struff; Denis Shapovalov	6; 3	4; 6	7^{7} 6^{2}
2	(Germany) (Canada)	Oscar Otte; Félix Auger-Aliassime	6^{1} 7^{7}	4; 6
3	(Germany) (Canada)	Kevin Krawietz / Tim Pütz; Vasek Pospisil / Denis Shapovalov	6; 2	3; 6	3; 6

==== Netherlands vs. Australia ====
Netherlands
0
Martin Carpena Arena, Málaga
22 November 2022

Australia
2

			1	2	3
1	(Netherlands) (Australia)	Tallon Griekspoor; Jordan Thompson	6; 4	5; 7	3; 6
2	(Netherlands) (Australia)	Botic van de Zandschulp; Alex de Minaur	7; 5	3; 6	4; 6
3	(Netherlands) (Australia)	Wesley Koolhof / Matwé Middelkoop; Matthew Ebden / Max Purcell				not played

==== Spain vs. Croatia ====
Spain
0
Martin Carpena Arena, Málaga
23 November 2022

Croatia
2

			1	2	3
1	(Spain) (Croatia)	Roberto Bautista Agut; Borna Ćorić	4; 6	6^{4} 7^{7}
2	(Spain) (Croatia)	Pablo Carreño Busta; Marin Čilić	7; 5	3; 6	6^{5} 7^{7}
3	(Spain) (Croatia)	Pablo Carreño Busta / Marcel Granollers; Nikola Mektić / Mate Pavić				not played

=== Semifinals ===
==== Italy vs. Canada ====
Italy
1
Martin Carpena Arena, Málaga
26 November 2022

Canada
2

			1	2	3
1	(Italy) (Canada)	Lorenzo Sonego; Denis Shapovalov	7^{7} 6^{4}	6^{5} 7^{7}	6; 4
2	(Italy) (Canada)	Lorenzo Musetti; Félix Auger-Aliassime	3; 6	4; 6
3	(Italy) (Canada)	Matteo Berrettini / Fabio Fognini; Félix Auger-Aliassime / Vasek Pospisil	6^{2} 7^{7}	5; 7

==== Australia vs. Croatia ====
Australia
2
Martin Carpena Arena, Málaga
25 November 2022

Croatia
1

			1	2	3
1	(Australia) (Croatia)	Thanasi Kokkinakis; Borna Ćorić	4; 6	3; 6
2	(Australia) (Croatia)	Alex de Minaur; Marin Čilić	6; 2	6; 2
3	(Australia) (Croatia)	Max Purcell / Jordan Thompson; Nikola Mektić / Mate Pavić	6^{3} 7^{7}	7; 5	6; 4

=== Final ===
==== Canada vs. Australia ====
Canada
2
Martin Carpena Arena, Málaga
27 November 2022

Australia
0

			1	2	3
1	(Canada) (Australia)	Denis Shapovalov; Thanasi Kokkinakis	6; 2	6; 4
2	(Canada) (Australia)	Félix Auger-Aliassime; Alex de Minaur	6; 3	6; 4
3	(Canada) (Australia)	Félix Auger-Aliassime / Vasek Pospisil; Max Purcell / Jordan Thompson				not played
