= 2024 Davis Cup World Group II play-offs =

Tennis tournament results

The 2024 Davis Cup World Group II play-offs will be held from 2 to 4 February 2024 and 15 to 16 March 2024. The twelve winners of this round will qualify for the 2024 Davis Cup World Group II while the twelve losers will play at the Group III of the corresponding continental zone.

== Teams ==
Twenty-four teams will play for twelve spots in the World Group II, in series decided on a home and away basis.

These twenty-four teams are:

- 12 losing teams from 2023 World Group II
- 12 teams from their Group III zone:
  - 3 from Europe
  - 3 from Asia/Oceania,
  - 3 from Americas, and
  - 3 from Africa.

The 12 winning teams from the play-offs will qualify for the World Group II and the 12 losing teams will play at the Group III of the corresponding continental zone.

#: Nations Ranking as of 18 September 2023.

Seeded teams

1. Uruguay (#46)
2. Slovenia (#49)
3. Tunisia (#52)
4. El Salvador (#53)
5. Hong Kong (#54)
6. Barbados (#56)
7. Morocco (#57)
8. South Africa (#58)
9. Indonesia (#59)
10. Bolivia (#60)
11. Estonia (#61)
12. Monaco (#62)

Unseeded teams

- Paraguay (#63)
- Jamaica (#65)
- China (#67)
- Thailand (#68)
- Vietnam (#70)
- Zimbabwe (#73)
- Cyprus (#74)
- Iran (#75)
- Costa Rica (#76)
- Pacific Oceania (#77)
- Moldova (#86)
- Togo (#94)

== Results summary ==
Home team	Score	Away team	Location	Venue	Surface
Uruguay [1]	3–2	Moldova	Montevideo	Carrasco Lawn Tennis Club	Clay
China	3–2	Slovenia [2]	Guangzhou	Guangzhou Development District International Tennis School	Hard
Tunisia [3]	3–0	Costa Rica	Tunis	Cité Nationale Sportive El Menzah	Hard
El Salvador [4]	4–0	Pacific Oceania	Santa Tecla	Polideportivo de Ciudad Merliot	Hard
Hong Kong [5]	3–1	Zimbabwe	Hong Kong	Victoria Park Tennis Stadium	Hard
Jamaica	2–3	Barbados [6]	Kingston	Eric Bell National Tennis Centre	Hard
Cyprus	1–3	Morocco [7]	Nicosia	National Tennis Centre	Hard
Vietnam	2–3	South Africa [8]	Từ Sơn	Hanaka Paris Ocean Park	Hard
Togo	3–2	Indonesia [9]	Lomé	Stade Omnisport de Lomé	Hard
Bolivia [10]	4–0	Thailand	La Paz	Club de Tenis La Paz	Clay
Iran	1–3	Estonia [11]	Colombo (Sri Lanka)	Sri Lanka Lawn Tennis Association Complex	Clay
Paraguay	1–3	Monaco [12]	Asunción	Club Internacional de Tenis	Clay

== Results ==
=== Uruguay vs. Moldova ===
Uruguay
3
Carrasco Lawn Tennis Club, Montevideo, Uruguay
3–4 February 2024
Clay

Moldova
2

			1	2	3
1	(Uruguay) (Moldova)	Franco Roncadelli; Ilya Snițari	4; 6	6; 1	6; 1
2	(Uruguay) (Moldova)	Joaquín Aguilar Cardozo; Radu Albot	2; 6	3; 6
3	(Uruguay) (Moldova)	Ariel Behar / Ignacio Carou; Radu Albot / Alexandr Cozbinov	7; 5	2; 6	6; 3
4	(Uruguay) (Moldova)	Franco Roncadelli; Radu Albot	3; 6	1; 6
5	(Uruguay) (Moldova)	Joaquín Aguilar Cardozo; Ilya Snițari	6; 1	6; 0

=== China vs. Slovenia ===
China
3
Guangzhou Development District International Tennis School, Guangzhou, China
2–3 February 2024
Hard

Slovenia
2

			1	2	3
1	(China) (Slovenia)	Zhang Zhizhen; Matic Križnik	6; 0	6; 2
2	(China) (Slovenia)	Zhou Yi; Sebastian Dominko	7; 5	6^{3} 7^{7}	6; 3
3	(China) (Slovenia)	Bu Yunchaokete / Zhang Zhizhen; Sebastian Dominko / Matic Križnik	3; 6	4; 6
4	(China) (Slovenia)	Zhang Zhizhen; Sebastian Dominko	3; 6	4; 6
5	(China) (Slovenia)	Zhou Yi; Matic Križnik	5; 7	6; 1	6; 3

=== Tunisia vs. Costa Rica ===
Tunisia
3
Cité Nationale Sportive El Menzah, Tunis, Tunisia
2–3 February 2024
Hard

Costa Rica
0

			1	2	3
1	(Tunisia) (Costa Rica)	Moez Echargui; Jesse Flores	6; 2	6; 3
2	(Tunisia) (Costa Rica)	Aziz Dougaz; Rodrigo Crespo Piedra	6; 3	5; 7	6; 4
3	(Tunisia) (Costa Rica)	Skander Mansouri / Aziz Ouakaa; Rodrigo Crespo Piedra / Jesse Flores	6^{4} 7^{7}	7^{7} 6^{3}	7; 5
4	(Tunisia) (Costa Rica)	Aziz Dougaz; Jesse Flores				not played
5	(Tunisia) (Costa Rica)	Moez Echargui; Rodrigo Crespo Piedra				not played

=== El Salvador vs. Pacific Oceania ===
El Salvador
4
Polideportivo de Ciudad Merliot Santa Tecla, Santa Tecla, El Salvador
2–3 February 2024
Hard

Pacific Oceania
0

			1	2	3
1	(El Salvador) (Pacific Oceania)	Diego Durán; Gillian Osmont	6; 3	6; 0
2	(El Salvador) (Pacific Oceania)	Marcelo Arévalo; Heve Kelley	6; 0	6; 2
3	(El Salvador) (Pacific Oceania)	Marcelo Arévalo / César Cruz; Matavao Fanguna / Gillian Osmont	6; 3	6; 1
4	(El Salvador) (Pacific Oceania)	Juan Carlos Fuentes Vásquez; Matavao Fanguna	6; 0	6; 3
5	(El Salvador) (Pacific Oceania)	Diego Durán; Heve Kelley				not played

=== Hong Kong vs. Zimbabwe ===
Hong Kong
3
Victoria Park Tennis Stadium, Hong Kong
3–4 February 2024
Hard

Zimbabwe
1

			1	2	3
1	(Hong Kong) (Zimbabwe)	Wong Hong-kit; Benjamin Lock	3; 6	6; 3	7^{7} 6^{5}
2	(Hong Kong) (Zimbabwe)	Coleman Wong; Courtney John Lock	6; 2	6; 0
3	(Hong Kong) (Zimbabwe)	Wong Chun-hun / Coleman Wong; Benjamin Lock / Courtney John Lock	6; 4	6; 0
4	(Hong Kong) (Zimbabwe)	Chan Kwok-shun; Benedict Badza	7^{7} 6^{5}	4; 6	6; 10
5	(Hong Kong) (Zimbabwe)	Wong Hong-kit; Courtney John Lock				not played

=== Jamaica vs. Barbados ===
Jamaica
2
Eric Bell National Tennis Centre, Kingston, Jamaica
3–4 February 2024
Hard

Barbados
3

			1	2	3
1	(Jamaica) (Barbados)	Blaise Bicknell; Kaipo Marshall	6; 1	3; 6	6; 1
2	(Jamaica) (Barbados)	Rowland Phillips; Darian King	3; 6	6; 3	5; 7
3	(Jamaica) (Barbados)	Blaise Bicknell / Rowland Phillips; Darian King / Haydn Lewis	6; 3	4; 6	4; 6
4	(Jamaica) (Barbados)	Blaise Bicknell; Darian King	6; 1	6; 0
5	(Jamaica) (Barbados)	Rowland Phillips; Kaipo Marshall	4; 6	6; 1	2; 6

=== Cyprus vs. Morocco ===
Cyprus
1
National Tennis Centre, Nicosia, Cyprus
3–4 February 2024
Hard

Morocco
3

			1	2	3
1	(Cyprus) (Morocco)	Petros Chrysochos; Yassine Dlimi	5; 7	6^{2} 7^{7}
2	(Cyprus) (Morocco)	Menelaos Efstathiou; Elliot Benchetrit	3; 6	2; 6
3	(Cyprus) (Morocco)	Sergis Kyratzis / Eleftherios Neos; Elliot Benchetrit / Adam Moundir	4; 6	4; 6
4	(Cyprus) (Morocco)	Styrianos Christodoulou; Hamza Karmoussi	6; 3	6; 1
5	(Cyprus) (Morocco)	Petros Chrysochos; Elliot Benchetrit				not played

=== Vietnam vs. South Africa ===
Vietnam
2
Hanaka Paris Ocean Park, Từ Sơn, Vietnam
2–3 February 2024
Hard

South Africa
3

			1	2	3
1	(Vietnam) (South Africa)	Lý Hoàng Nam; Philip Henning	6; 3	6; 4
2	(Vietnam) (South Africa)	Trịnh Linh Giang; Kris van Wyk	6; 4	3; 6	0; 4	retired
3	(Vietnam) (South Africa)	Lý Hoàng Nam / Nguyễn Văn Phương; Philip Henning / Christiaan Worst	6; 4	1; 6	4; 6
4	(Vietnam) (South Africa)	Lý Hoàng Nam; Kris van Wyk	6; 4	3; 6	6; 3
5	(Vietnam) (South Africa)	Trịnh Linh Giang; Philip Henning	2; 6	2; 6

=== Togo vs. Indonesia ===
Togo
3
Stade Omnisport de Lomé, Lomé, Togo
3–4 February 2024
Hard

Indonesia
2

			1	2	3
1	(Togo) (Indonesia)	Komlavi Loglo; Muhammad Rifqi Fitriadi	1; 6	4; 6
2	(Togo) (Indonesia)	Thomas Setodji; Anthony Susanto	6; 1	6; 2
3	(Togo) (Indonesia)	Komlavi Loglo / Thomas Setodji; Muhammad Rifqi Fitriadi / Anthony Susanto	6; 3	3; 6	7; 5
4	(Togo) (Indonesia)	Thomas Setodji; Muhammad Rifqi Fitriadi	2; 6	3; 6
5	(Togo) (Indonesia)	Komlavi Loglo; Anthony Susanto	6; 2	6; 2

=== Bolivia vs. Thailand ===
Bolivia
4
Club de Tenis La Paz, La Paz, Bolivia
3–4 February 2024
Clay

Thailand
0

			1	2	3
1	(Bolivia) (Thailand)	Juan Carlos Prado Ángelo; Maximus Jones	6; 3	6; 2
2	(Bolivia) (Thailand)	Murkel Dellien; Wishaya Trongcharoenchaikul	6; 1	6; 1
3	(Bolivia) (Thailand)	Boris Arias / Federico Zeballos; Pruchya Isaro / Kasidit Samrej	7^{10} 6^{8}	6; 4
4	(Bolivia) (Thailand)	Boris Arias; Thanapet Chanta	6; 4	6; 3
5	(Bolivia) (Thailand)	Juan Carlos Prado Ángelo; Wishaya Trongcharoenchaikul				not played

=== Iran vs. Estonia ===
Iran
1
Sri Lanka Lawn Tennis Association Complex, Colombo, Sri Lanka
15–16 March 2024
Clay

Estonia
3

			1	2	3
1	(Iran) (Estonia)	Hamidreza Nadaf; Oliver Ojakäär	3; 6	0; 6
2	(Iran) (Estonia)	Sina Moghimi; Kristjan Tamm	1; 6	7; 5	6; 4
3	(Iran) (Estonia)	Samyar Elyasi / Ali Yazdani; Kenneth Raisma / Siim Troost	6; 4	3; 6	6^{3} 7^{7}
4	(Iran) (Estonia)	Sina Moghimi; Oliver Ojakäär	3; 6	1; 6
5	(Iran) (Estonia)	Hamidreza Nadaf; Kristjan Tamm				not played

=== Paraguay vs. Monaco ===
Paraguay
1
Club Internacional de Tenis, Asunción, Paraguay
3–4 February 2024
Clay

Monaco
3

			1	2	3
1	(Paraguay) (Monaco)	Daniel Vallejo; Benjamin Balleret	6; 2	6; 4
2	(Paraguay) (Monaco)	Martín Antonio Vergara del Puerto; Valentin Vacherot	2; 6	1; 6
3	(Paraguay) (Monaco)	Daniel Vallejo / Martín Antonio Vergara del Puerto; Romain Arneodo / Hugo Nys	6^{2} 7^{7}	4; 6
4	(Paraguay) (Monaco)	Daniel Vallejo; Valentin Vacherot	7^{7} 6^{0}	4; 6	4; 6
5	(Paraguay) (Monaco)	Martín Antonio Vergara del Puerto; Benjamin Balleret				not played
