= 2024 Davis Cup Europe Zone Group IV =

Davis Cup competition in 2024

The Europe Zone was the unique zone within Group 4 of the regional Davis Cup competition in 2024. The zone's competition was held in round robin format in Tirana, Albania from 12 to 15 June 2024.

== Participating nations ==
- Albania
- Andorra
- Armenia
- Iceland
- Liechtenstein
- Malta
- San Marino

== Draw ==
Date: 12–15 June 2024

Location: National Sport Park, Tirana, Albania (Hard)

Format: Round-robin basis. One pool of four teams and one pool of three teams and nations will play each team once in their pool. Nations finishing in the top two of each pool will enter promotional play-offs, with the first of Pool A facing the second of Pool B and the first of Pool B facing the second of Pool A, and the two winners will be promoted to Europe Zone Group III in 2025.

=== Seeding ===
Pot	Nation	Rank^{1}	Seed
1	Armenia	98=	1
1	San Marino	98=	2
2	Malta	103=	3
2	Iceland	117	4
3	Andorra	121	5
3	Albania	125	6
4	Liechtenstein	127	7

- ^{1}Davis Cup Rankings as of 18 March 2024

=== Round Robin ===
==== Pool A ====
		MLT	ARM	ALB	RR; W–L	Set; W–L	Game; W–L	Standings
3	Malta		3–0	3–0	2–0	6–0 (%)	– (%)	1
1	Armenia	0–3		3–0	1–1	3–3 (%)	– (%)	2
6	Albania	0–3	0–3		0–2	0–6 (%)	– (%)	3

==== Pool B ====
		SMR	LIE	AND	ISL	RR; W–L	Set; W–L	Game; W–L	Standings
2	San Marino		2–1	2–1	3–0	3–0	7–2 (%)	– (%)	1
7	Liechtenstein	1–2		2–1	2–1	2–1	5–4 (%)	– (%)	2
5	Andorra	1–2	1–2		2–1	1–2	4–5 (%)	– (%)	3
4	Iceland	0–3	1–2	1–2		0–3	2–7 (%)	– (%)	4

Standings are determined by: 1. number of wins; 2. number of matches; 3. in two-team ties, head-to-head records; 4. in three-team ties, (a) percentage of sets won (head-to-head records if two teams remain tied), then (b) percentage of games won (head-to-head records if two teams remain tied), then (c) Davis Cup rankings.

=== Playoffs ===
Placing	A Team	Score	B Team
Promotional	Malta	2–0	Liechtenstein
Promotional	San Marino	1–2	Armenia
Fifth	Albania	2–1	Andorra

- Armenia and Malta were promoted to 2025 Davis Cup Europe Zone Group III.

== Round Robin ==
=== Pool A ===
==== Armenia vs. Albania ====
Armenia
3
National Sport Park, Tirana, Albania
12 June 2024
Hard

Albania
0

			1	2	3
1	(Armenia) (Albania)	Mikayel Avanesyan; Martin Muedini	7; 5	6; 0
2	(Armenia) (Albania)	Harutyun Sofyan; Daniel Ostap	3; 6	7^{7} 6^{4}	7^{7} 6^{3}
3	(Armenia) (Albania)	Mikayel Avetisyan / Henrik Nikoghosyan; Denis Gaba / Joan Sura	6; 4	6; 3

==== Armenia vs. Malta ====
Armenia
0
National Sport Park, Tirana, Albania
13 June 2024
Hard

Malta
3

			1	2	3
1	(Armenia) (Malta)	Mikayel Avanesyan; Liam Delicata	1; 6	3; 6
2	(Armenia) (Malta)	Sedrak Khachatryan; Alex Degabriele	4; 6	0; 6
3	(Armenia) (Malta)	Mikayel Avetisyan / Henrik Nikoghosyan; Alex Degabriele / Liam Delicata	1; 6	2; 6

==== Malta vs. Albania ====
Malta
3
National Sport Park, Tirana, Albania
14 June 2024
Hard

Albania
0

			1	2	3
1	(Malta) (Albania)	Liam Delicata; Joan Sura	6; 0	6; 2
2	(Malta) (Albania)	Alex Degabriele; Martin Muedini	6; 0	6; 1
3	(Malta) (Albania)	Alex Degabriele / Liam Delicata; Martin Muedini / Joan Sura	6; 0	6; 1

=== Pool B ===
==== San Marino vs. Andorra ====
San Marino
2
National Sport Park, Tirana, Albania
12 June 2024
Hard

Andorra
1

			1	2	3
1	(San Marino) (Andorra)	Filippo Tommesani; Guillem Davasse Vidal	6; 3	6; 1
2	(San Marino) (Andorra)	Marco De Rossi; Eric Cervos Noguer	6; 3	6; 4
3	(San Marino) (Andorra)	Mattia Muraccini / Filippo Tommesani; Eric Cervos Noguer / Jordi Trilla Clanchet	5; 7	6; 3	6^{1} 7^{7}

==== Iceland vs. Liechtenstein ====
Iceland
1
National Sport Park, Tirana, Albania
12 June 2024
Hard

Liechtenstein
2

			1	2	3
1	(Iceland) (Liechtenstein)	Sindri Snaer Svanbergsson; Moritz Glauser	0; 6	0; 6
2	(Iceland) (Liechtenstein)	Egill Sigurdsson; Serafin Zund	1; 6	7^{7} 6^{5}	6; 4
3	(Iceland) (Liechtenstein)	Egill Sigurdsson / Sindri Snaer Svanbergsson; Moritz Glauser / Leo Hanke	3; 6	1; 6

==== San Marino vs. Liechtenstein ====
San Marino
2
National Sport Park, Tirana, Albania
13 June 2024
Hard

Liechtenstein
1

			1	2	3
1	(San Marino) (Liechtenstein)	Filippo Tommesani; Moritz Glauser	1; 6	2; 6
2	(San Marino) (Liechtenstein)	Marco De Rossi; Serafin Zund	6; 1	6; 0
3	(San Marino) (Liechtenstein)	Marco De Rossi / Filippo Tommesani; Moritz Glauser / Leo Hanke	6; 2	2; 6	6; 3

==== Iceland vs. Andorra ====
Iceland
1
National Sport Park, Tirana, Albania
13 June 2024
Hard

Andorra
2

			1	2	3
1	(Iceland) (Andorra)	Sindri Snaer Svanbergsson; Eric Cervos Noguer	0; 6	0; 6
2	(Iceland) (Andorra)	Egill Sigurdsson; Pablo Carrascosa	6; 3	6; 3
3	(Iceland) (Andorra)	Egill Sigurdsson / Sindri Snaer Svanbergsson; Eric Cervos Noguer / Jordi Trilla Clanchet	2; 6	0; 6

==== San Marino vs. Iceland ====
San Marino
3
National Sport Park, Tirana, Albania
14 June 2024
Hard

Iceland
0

			1	2	3
1	(San Marino) (Iceland)	Mattia Muraccini; Sindri Snaer Svanbergsson	6; 0	6; 2
2	(San Marino) (Iceland)	Marco De Rossi; Egill Sigurdsson	5; 0			retired
3	(San Marino) (Iceland)	Marco De Rossi / Filippo Tommesani; Egill Sigurdsson / Sindri Snaer Svanbergsson				w/o

==== Andorra vs. Liechtenstein ====
Andorra
1
National Sport Park, Tirana, Albania
14 June 2024
Hard

Liechtenstein
2

			1	2	3
1	(Andorra) (Liechtenstein)	Eric Cervos Noguer; Moritz Glauser	6; 4	6; 2
2	(Andorra) (Liechtenstein)	Jordi Trilla Clanchet; Serafin Zund	0; 6	1; 6
3	(Andorra) (Liechtenstein)	Eric Cervos Noguer / Jordi Trilla Clanchet; Moritz Glauser / Serafin Zund	6; 3	1; 6	4; 6

== Play-offs ==
=== Promotional play-offs ===
==== Malta vs. Liechtenstein ====
Malta
2
National Sport Park, Tirana, Albania
15 June 2024
Hard

Liechtenstein
0

			1	2	3
1	(Malta) (Liechtenstein)	Liam Delicata; Moritz Glauser	6; 3	6; 2
2	(Malta) (Liechtenstein)	Alex Degabriele; Serafin Zund	6; 3	5; 7	7; 5
3	(Malta) (Liechtenstein)	Alex Degabriele / Liam Delicata; Moritz Glauser / Serafin Zund				not played

==== San Marino vs. Armenia ====
San Marino
1
National Sport Park, Tirana, Albania
15 June 2024
Hard

Armenia
2

			1	2	3
1	(San Marino) (Armenia)	Filippo Tommesani; Mikayel Avanesyan	4; 6	4; 6
2	(San Marino) (Armenia)	Marco De Rossi; Sedrak Khachatryan	6; 0	6; 2
3	(San Marino) (Armenia)	Marco De Rossi / Filippo Tommesani; Henrik Nikoghosyan / Harutyun Sofyan	3; 6	1; 6

=== Fifth place play-off ===
==== Albania vs. Andorra ====
Albania
2
National Sport Park, Tirana, Albania
15 June 2024
Hard

Andorra
1

			1	2	3
1	(Albania) (Andorra)	Joan Sura; Guillem Davasse Vidal	6; 0	6; 3
2	(Albania) (Andorra)	Martin Muedini; Pablo Carrascosa	6; 4	3; 6	3; 6
3	(Albania) (Andorra)	Daniel Ostap / Joan Sura; Eric Cervos Noguer / Jordi Trilla Clanchet	6; 4	2; 6	7; 5

== Final placements ==
Placing	Teams	
Promoted/First	Armenia	Malta
Third	San Marino	Liechtenstein
Fifth	Albania	
Sixth	Andorra	
Seventh	Iceland	

- Armenia and Malta were promoted to 2025 Davis Cup Europe Zone Group III.
