= 2022 Davis Cup World Group I =

International tennis competition

The 2022 Davis Cup World Group I was held on 15–18 September. The twelve winners from the World Group I will play at the Qualifying round and the twelve losers will play at the World Group I Play-offs in 2023.

== Teams ==
Twenty-four teams participated in the World Group I, in series decided on a home and away basis. The seedings are based on the Nations Ranking of 7 March 2022.

These twenty-four teams were:

- 11 losing teams from Qualifying round, in March 2022
- 12 winning teams from World Group I Play-offs, in March 2022
- 1 highest-ranked losing team from World Group I Play-offs (Uzbekistan)

The 12 winning teams from the World Group I will play at the Qualifying round and the 12 losing teams will play at the World Group I Play-offs in 2023.

#: Nations Ranking as of 7 March 2022.

Seeded teams

- Austria (#16)
- Colombia (#17)
- Czech Republic (#18)
- Japan (#19)
- Ecuador (#22)
- Chile (#23)
- Brazil (#24)
- India (#25)
- Hungary (#26)
- Slovakia (#27)
- Finland (#28)
- Bosnia and Herzegovina (#29)

Unseeded teams

- Romania (#30)
- Uzbekistan (#31)
- Norway (#32)
- Israel (#33)
- Peru (#34)
- Portugal (#35)
- Mexico (#36)
- Ukraine (#37)
- Turkey (#38)
- Pakistan (#39)
- New Zealand (#40)
- Switzerland (#45)

== Results summary ==
Home team	Score	Away team	Location	Venue	Surface
Austria [1]	4–0	Pakistan	Tulln an der Donau	Tennis Club Tulln	Clay
Colombia [2]	4–0	Turkey	Bogotá	Carmel Club	Clay
Israel	1–3	Czech Republic [3]	Tel Aviv	Shlomo Group Arena	Hard (i)
Uzbekistan	3–1	Japan [4]	Tashkent	Olympic Tennis School	Hard
Ecuador [5]	2-3	Switzerland	Salinas	Salinas Golf & Tenis Club	Hard
Peru	2–3	Chile [6]	Lima	Club Lawn Tennis de La Exposición	Clay
Portugal	3–1	Brazil [7]	Viana do Castelo	Centro Cultural de Viana do Castelo	Hard (i)
Norway	3–1	India [8]	Lillehammer	Håkons Hall	Hard (i)
Ukraine	1–3	Hungary [9]	Vilnius, Lithuania	SEB Arena	Hard (i)
Slovakia [10]	3–1	Romania	Bratislava	NTC Arena	Clay (i)
Finland [11]	5–0	New Zealand	Espoo	Espoo Metro Areena	Hard (i)
Bosnia and Herzegovina [12]	3–1	Mexico	Siroki Brijeg	Tennis Academy SET	Clay

== World Group I results ==
=== Austria vs. Pakistan ===
Austria
4
Tennis Club Tulln, Tulln an der Donau, Austria
16–17 September 2022
Clay

Pakistan
0

			1	2	3
1	(Austria) (Pakistan)	Jurij Rodionov; Muhammad Shoaib Khan	6; 3	6; 1
2	(Austria) (Pakistan)	Filip Misolic; Muzammil Murtaza	6; 1	7^{7} 6^{4}
3	(Austria) (Pakistan)	Alexander Erler / Lucas Miedler; Aqeel Khan / Aisam-ul-Haq Qureshi	6; 3	6; 3
4	(Austria) (Pakistan)	Jurij Rodionov; Muzammil Murtaza	6; 2	6; 2
5	(Austria) (Pakistan)	Filip Misolic; Muhammad Shoaib Khan				not played

=== Colombia vs. Turkey ===
Colombia
4
Carmel Club, Bogotá, Colombia
17–18 September 2022
Clay

Turkey
0

			1	2	3
1	(Colombia) (Turkey)	Nicolás Mejía; Altuğ Çelikbilek	6; 3	1; 6	7^{7} 6^{4}
2	(Colombia) (Turkey)	Daniel Elahi Galán; Cem İlkel	6; 2	6; 2
3	(Colombia) (Turkey)	Juan Sebastián Cabal / Robert Farah; Cem İlkel / Ergi Kırkın	6; 2	6; 2
4	(Colombia) (Turkey)	Nicolás Barrientos; Yankı Erel	6; 4	7; 5
5	(Colombia) (Turkey)	Nicolás Mejía; Cem İlkel				not played

=== Israel vs. Czech Republic ===
Israel
1
Shlomo Group Arena, Tel Aviv, Israel
16–17 September 2022
Hard (i)

Czech Republic
3

			1	2	3
1	(Israel) (Czech Republic)	Daniel Cukierman; Jiří Lehečka	0; 6	4; 6
2	(Israel) (Czech Republic)	Edan Leshem; Tomáš Macháč	4; 6	5; 7
3	(Israel) (Czech Republic)	Daniel Cukierman / Edan Leshem; Jiří Lehečka / Tomáš Macháč	6; 4	6; 3
4	(Israel) (Czech Republic)	Edan Leshem; Jiří Lehečka	6; 4	0; 6	5; 7
5	(Israel) (Czech Republic)	Daniel Cukierman; Tomáš Macháč				not played

=== Uzbekistan vs. Japan ===
Uzbekistan
3
Olympic Tennis School, Tashkent, Uzbekistan
16–17 September 2022
Hard

Japan
1

			1	2	3
1	(Uzbekistan) (Japan)	Denis Istomin; Sho Shimabukuro	6; 3	6^{5} 7^{7}	6^{9} 7^{11}
2	(Uzbekistan) (Japan)	Sergey Fomin; Shintaro Mochizuki	7^{7} 6^{3}	7^{7} 6^{2}
3	(Uzbekistan) (Japan)	Sanjar Fayziev / Denis Istomin; Kaito Uesugi / Yosuke Watanuki	3; 6	7^{7} 6^{2}	6; 2
4	(Uzbekistan) (Japan)	Sergey Fomin; Sho Shimabukuro	7^{7} 6^{1}	7; 5
5	(Uzbekistan) (Japan)	Denis Istomin; Shintaro Mochizuki				not played

=== Ecuador vs. Switzerland ===
Ecuador
2
Salinas Golf & Tenis Club, Salinas, Ecuador
17–18 September 2022
Hard

Switzerland
3

			1	2	3
1	(Ecuador) (Switzerland)	Roberto Quiroz; Marc-Andrea Hüsler	4; 6	2; 6
2	(Ecuador) (Switzerland)	Emilio Gómez; Henri Laaksonen	6; 4	6; 3
3	(Ecuador) (Switzerland)	Gonzalo Escobar / Diego Hidalgo; Marc-Andrea Hüsler / Dominic Stricker	5; 7	6; 4	3; 6
4	(Ecuador) (Switzerland)	Emilio Gómez; Marc-Andrea Hüsler	6^{3} 7^{7}	6; 2	6; 2
5	(Ecuador) (Switzerland)	Roberto Quiroz; Alexander Ritschard	1; 6	2; 6

=== Peru vs. Chile ===
Peru
2
Club Lawn Tennis de La Exposición, Lima, Peru
17–18 September 2022
Clay

Chile
3

			1	2	3
1	(Peru) (Chile)	Nicolás Álvarez; Alejandro Tabilo	2; 6	4; 6
2	(Peru) (Chile)	Juan Pablo Varillas; Nicolás Jarry	7^{7} 6^{3}	1; 6	6; 4
3	(Peru) (Chile)	Sergio Galdós / Arklon Huertas del Pino; Nicolás Jarry / Alejandro Tabilo	4; 6	2; 6
4	(Peru) (Chile)	Juan Pablo Varillas; Alejandro Tabilo	1; 6	6; 4	6; 4
5	(Peru) (Chile)	Nicolás Álvarez; Nicolás Jarry	3; 6	0; 6

=== Portugal vs. Brazil ===
Portugal
3
Centro Cultural de Viana do Castelo, Viana do Castelo, Portugal
16–17 September 2022
Hard (i)

Brazil
1

			1	2	3
1	(Portugal) (Brazil)	João Sousa; Felipe Meligeni Alves	6; 1	6; 3
2	(Portugal) (Brazil)	Nuno Borges; Thiago Monteiro	6^{5} 7^{7}	6; 4	7^{7} 6^{3}
3	(Portugal) (Brazil)	Nuno Borges / Francisco Cabral; Rafael Matos / Felipe Meligeni Alves	3; 6	6; 0	3; 6
4	(Portugal) (Brazil)	João Sousa; Thiago Monteiro	6; 3	6; 1
5	(Portugal) (Brazil)	Nuno Borges; Felipe Meligeni Alves				not played

=== Norway vs. India ===
Norway
3
Håkons Hall, Lillehammer, Norway
16–17 September 2022
Hard (i)

India
1

			1	2	3
1	(Norway) (India)	Casper Ruud; Prajnesh Gunneswaran	6; 1	6; 4
2	(Norway) (India)	Viktor Durasovic; Ramkumar Ramanathan	6; 1	6; 4
3	(Norway) (India)	Casper Ruud / Viktor Durasovic; Yuki Bhambri / Saketh Myneni	6; 3	3; 6	6; 3
4	(Norway) (India)	Lukas Hellum Lilleengen; Sumit Nagal	2; 6	1; 6
5	(Norway) (India)	Viktor Durasovic; Prajnesh Gunneswaran				not played

=== Ukraine vs. Hungary ===
Ukraine
1
SEB Arena, Vilnius, Lithuania
15–16 September 2022
Hard (i)

Hungary
3

			1	2	3
1	(Ukraine) (Hungary)	Viacheslav Bielinskyi; Márton Fucsovics	3; 6	2; 6
2	(Ukraine) (Hungary)	Vladyslav Orlov; Zsombor Piros	2; 6	2; 6
3	(Ukraine) (Hungary)	Illya Beloborodko / Vladyslav Manafov; Péter Fajta / Fábián Marozsán	7^{7} 6^{4}	6; 4
4	(Ukraine) (Hungary)	Illya Beloborodko; Márton Fucsovics	2; 6	5; 7
5	(Ukraine) (Hungary)	Viacheslav Bielinskyi; Zsombor Piros				not played

=== Slovakia vs. Romania ===
Slovakia
3
NTC Arena, Bratislava, Slovakia
16–17 September 2022
Clay (i)

Romania
1

			1	2	3
1	(Slovakia) (Romania)	Norbert Gombos; Nicholas David Ionel	7^{7} 6^{4}	5; 7	4; 6
2	(Slovakia) (Romania)	Alex Molčan; Marius Copil	7; 5	6; 1
3	(Slovakia) (Romania)	Lukáš Klein / Igor Zelenay; Marius Copil / Victor Vlad Cornea	7^{7} 6^{4}	6; 2
4	(Slovakia) (Romania)	Alex Molčan; Nicholas David Ionel	6; 1	6; 1
5	(Slovakia) (Romania)	Norbert Gombos; Marius Copil				not played

=== Finland vs. New Zealand ===
Finland
5
Espoo Metro Areena, Espoo, Finland
16–17 September 2022
Hard (i)

New Zealand
0

			1	2	3
1	(Finland) (New Zealand)	Emil Ruusuvuori; Kiranpal Pannu	6; 1	6; 2
2	(Finland) (New Zealand)	Otto Virtanen; Ajeet Rai	6; 4	6; 3
3	(Finland) (New Zealand)	Harri Heliövaara / Emil Ruusuvuori; Artem Sitak / Michael Venus	7; 5	3; 6	6; 3
4	(Finland) (New Zealand)	Emil Ruusuvuori; Isaac Becroft	6; 2	6; 1
5	(Finland) (New Zealand)	Eero Vasa; Kiranpal Pannu	6; 2	6; 3

=== Bosnia and Herzegovina vs. Mexico ===
Bosnia and Herzegovina
3
Tennis Academy SET, Široki Brijeg, Bosnia and Herzegovina
16–17 September 2022
Clay

Mexico
1

			1	2	3
1	(Bosnia and Herzegovina) (Mexico)	Nerman Fatić; Gerardo López Villaseñor	6; 3	6; 4
2	(Bosnia and Herzegovina) (Mexico)	Damir Džumhur; Alan Fernando Rubio Fierros	6; 2	6; 1
3	(Bosnia and Herzegovina) (Mexico)	Mirza Bašić / Tomislav Brkić; Santiago González / Miguel Ángel Reyes Varela	6; 4	7^{7} 6^{4}
4	(Bosnia and Herzegovina) (Mexico)	Andrej Nedić; Luis Carlos Álvarez Valdés	2; 6	7; 5	[8] [10]
5	(Bosnia and Herzegovina) (Mexico)	Nerman Fatić; Alan Fernando Rubio Fierros				not played
