= Siim Troost =

Estonian tennis player

- Country (sports): Estonia
- Residence: Tallinn, Estonia
- Born: 7 December 1999 (age 25)
- Plays: Right-handed (two-handed backhand)
- College: University of Minnesota (2019–21); Vanderbilt University (2021–current)
- Prize money: $10,650

Singles
- Career record: 0–1 (at ATP Tour level, Grand Slam level, and in Davis Cup)
- Career titles: 0
- Highest ranking: No. 1374 (18 July 2022)

Doubles
- Career record: 1–1 (at ATP Tour level, Grand Slam level, and in Davis Cup)
- Career titles: 1 ITF
- Highest ranking: No. 607 (6 May 2024)
- Current ranking: No. 1493 (25 November 2024)

Team competitions
- Davis Cup: 4–2
- Last updated on: 25 November 2024.

Siim Troost (born 7 December 1999) is an Estonian tennis player.

Troost has a career high ATP singles ranking of 1374, achieved on 18 July 2022. He also has a career high doubles ranking of 607, achieved on 6 May 2024. Troost has won 1 ITF doubles title.

Troost represents Estonia at the Davis Cup, where he has a W/L record of 4–2.

Troost currently plays college tennis at Vanderbilt University. He previously played for the University of Minnesota.
