= Thomas Setodji =

French tennis player (born 1995)

- Country (sports): France; Togo (in Davis Cup)
- Born: 13 October 1995 (age 30) Gonesse, France
- Plays: Right-handed (two-handed backhand)
- Prize money: $25,078

Singles
- Career record: 3–2 (at ATP Tour level, Grand Slam level, and in Davis Cup)
- Career titles: 0
- Highest ranking: No. 794 (22 July 2024)

Doubles
- Career record: 2–0 (at ATP Tour level, Grand Slam level, and in Davis Cup)
- Career titles: 1 ITF
- Highest ranking: No. 786 (7 January 2019)

Team competitions
- Davis Cup: 16–3
- Last updated on: 5 April 2025.

Thomas Setodji (born 13 October 1995) is a French tennis player of Togolese descent who is serving a ban from the sport for match-fixing. He has a career high ATP singles ranking of 794, achieved on 22 July 2024, and a highest doubles ranking of 786, achieved on 7 January 2019. He has won one ITF doubles title. Setodji represents Togo in the Davis Cup.

In April 2025, he was banned from tennis for 10 years, fined $20,000 and ordered to pay 5,500 Euros in restitution after admitting fixing three matches in 2017 and failing to report a corrupt approach in 2018. The International Tennis Integrity Agency said the case was linked to a criminal investigation involving a match-fixing syndicate in Belgium whose leader had been sent to prison for five years in 2023. Setodji's suspension will end on 31 March 2035.

== Challenger and ITF World Tennis Tour Finals ==
=== Singles: 1 (0–1) ===
Legend ATP Challenger Tour (0–0) ITF World Tennis Tour (0–1)	Finals by surface Hard (0–0) Clay (0–1) Grass (0–0) Carpet (0–0)

Result	W–L	Date	Tournament	Tier	Surface	Opponent	Score
Loss	0–1	Jul 2023	M25 Brazzaville, Congo Republic	World Tour	Clay	(France) Calvin Hemery	6–4, 2–6, 3–6

=== Doubles 3 (1–2) ===
Legend ATP Challenger (0–0) ITF Futures / World Tennis Tour (0–2)	Finals by surface Hard (0–1) Clay (1–1) Grass (0–0) Carpet (0–0)

Result	W–L	Date	Tournament	Tier	Surface	Partner	Opponents	Score
Loss	0–1	Jul 2017	Zimbabwe F3, Harare	Futures	Hard	(France) Baptiste Crepatte	(United States) Nathaniel Lammons (Zimbabwe) Benjamin Lock	6–7^{(4–7)}, 2–6
Loss	0–2	Sep 2019	M25 La Marsa, Tunisia	World Tennis Tour	Clay	(Tunisia) Moez Echargui	(Tunisia) Aziz Dougaz (Tunisia) Skander Mansouri	2–6, 6–4, [8–10]
Win	1–2	Sep 2019	M15 Tabarka, Tunisia	World Tennis Tour	Clay	(Tunisia) Moez Echargui	(Germany) Henri Squire (Germany) Paul Wörner	6–2, 6–4
