= Yegor =

Yegor (Russian: Егор, [jɪˈɡor]; Belarusian: Ягор, romanized: Yahor; Ukrainian: Єгор, romanized: Yehor) is an East Slavic given name. Other spellings include Egor, Egori, Jegor (a common variant in Slavic countries with a Latin alphabet) and Jegors (Latvian variant).

The name originated as a colloquial form of the name Георгий, later accepted into formal speech. It is derived from Greek Γεώργιος (Georgy), (Note: Max Vasmer suggests that this derivation from Γεώργιος was possibly under the influence of another Greek name, Γρηγόριος.) with initial [Γ] omitted due to merger of soft [г] -> [й] before [е] ([ге]->[йе]->[е]). (Note: The phenomenon [ге]->[йе]->[е] is still present is colloquial speech or some dialects of Russian: герой (hero) -> ерой). By the same phonemic reason the name Γεώργιος was earlier converted into Еорий -> Юрий, Yury.

Notable people with these names include:

== Egor ==
- Egor Anisimov (born 1987), Russian politician
- Egor Antropov (born 1992), Russian ice hockey player
- Egor Averin (born 1989), Russian ice hockey player
- Egor Babaev (born 1973), Russian-born Swedish physicist
- Egor Baranov (born 1988), Russian film director
- Egor Bazin (born 1995), Russian ice dancer
- Egor Beroev (born 1977), Russian actor
- Egor Chinakhov (born 2001), Russian ice hockey player
- Egor Degtyarev, Russian swimmer
- Egor Druzhinin (born 1972), Russian actor and film director
- Egor Dugin (born 1990), Russian ice hockey player
- Egor Egorovich Staal (1822–1907), Russian diplomat
- Egor Feoktistov (born 1993), Russian volleyball player
- Egor Gerasimov (born 1992), Belarusian tennis player
- Egor Golovkin (born 1983), Russian pair skater
- Egor Kliuka (born 1995), Russian volleyball player of Belarusian descent
- Egor Korotkov (born 1986), Russian skier
- Egor Koulechov (born 1994), Israeli-Russian professional basketball player for Israeli team Ironi Nahariya
- Egor Kreed (born 1994), Russian rapper and singer-songwriter
- Egor Krimets (born 1992), Uzbek football player of Ukrainian descent
- Egor Kuimov (born 1999), Russian swimmer
- Egor Kuroptev, Russian and Georgian political expert and media manager
- Egor Lavrov (born 1981), Russian businessman
- Egor Lazarev (1855–1937), Russian revolutionary, populist, politician, delegate, education minister, and writer
- Egor Makovsky (1802–1866), Russian painter and accountant
- Egor Matvievici (born 1997), Moldovan tennis player
- Egor Mekhontsev (born 1984), Russian boxer
- Egor Milovzorov (born 1987), Russian ice hockey player
- Egor Orudzhev (born 1995), Russian racing driver
- Egor Popov (1913–2001), American engineer
- Big Baby Tape (Egor Rakitin, born 2000), Russian rapper
- Egor Sharov (born 1988), Russian Paralympian athlete
- Egor Shastin (born 1982), Ukrainian-Russian ice hockey player
- Egor Shaykov (born 1980), Russian football and beach soccer player
- Egor Shuppe (1971–2023), Russian and British businessman and venture investor
- Egor Silin (born 1988), Russian road racing cyclist
- Egor Vyaltsev (born 1985), Russian basketball player
- Egor Yakovlev (born 1991), Russian ice hockey player
- Egor Zamula (born 2000), Russian ice hockey player
- Egor Zakroev (born 1993), Russian pair skater
- Egor Zheshko (born 1999), Belarusian singer

== Jegor ==
- Jegor Solovjov (1871–1942), Estonian politician

== Yahor, Yehor ==
- Yehor Luhachov (born 1988), Ukrainian footballer
- Yahor Maistrov (born 1988), Belarusian ice dancer
- Yahor Zubovich (born 1989), Belarusian footballer

== Yegor ==
- Yegor Altman (born 1975), Russian businessman
- Yegor Alyoshin (born 1992), Russian ice hockey player
- Yegor Azovsky (born 1985), Kazakh football player
- Yegor Baburin (born 1993), Russian football player
- Yegor Borisov (born 1954), Russian politician
- Yegor Chernyshov (footballer, born 1997)
- Yegor Chernyshov (footballer, born 1998)
- Yegor Danilkin (born 1995), Russian football player
- Yegor Filipenko (born 1988), Belarusian football player
- Yegor Gaidar (1956–2009), Russian economist and politician
- Yegor Generalov (born 1993), Russian football player
- Yegor Glukhov (born 1998), Russian football player
- Yegor Golenkov (born 1999), Russian football player
- Yegor Ivanovich Zolotarev (1847–1878), Russian mathematician
- Yegor Kholodilov (born 1999), Russian football player
- Yegor Kiryakov (born 1974), Russian football player
- Yegor Kondakov (born 1998), Russian football player
- Yegor Korshkov (born 1996), Russian ice hockey player
- Yegor Kryshtafovich (born 1980), Russian football player
- Yegor Ligachyov (1920–2021), Russian politician
- Yegor Letov (1964–2008), Russian poet and musician
- Yegor Martynov (born 1990), Russian ice hockey player
- Yegor Mikhailov (born 1978), Russian ice hockey player
- Yegor Nikolayev (born 1988), Russian runner
- Yegor Nikulin (born 1997), Russian football player
- Yegor Okorokov (born 1989), Russian football player
- Yegor Omelyanenko (born 1993), Russian ice hockey player
- Yegor Petrov (1862–1918), Russian worker and deputy
- Yegor Podomatsky (born 1976), Russian ice hockey player
- Yegor Prutsev (born 2002), Russian football player
- Yegor Rudkovsky (born 1996), Russian football player
- Yegor Sharangovich (born 1998), Belarusian ice hockey player
- Yegor Shevchenko (born 1978), Russian football player
- Yegor Solomatin (born 1964), Russian politician
- Yegor Sorokin (born 1995), Russian footballer
- Yegor Stroyev (born 1937), Russian politician
- Yegor Surin (born 2006), Russian ice hockey player
- Yegor Sysuyev (born 1997), Russian football player
- Yegor Tarakanov (born 1987), Russian football player
- Yegor Titov (born 1976), Russian football player and coach
- Yegor Tolstoy (1802–1874), Russian general and politician
- Yegor Yakovlev (1930–2005), Russian journalist
- Yegor Yegorov (born 1992), Russian football referee and a former player
- Yegor Yevdokimov (born 1982), Russian handball player
- Yegor Zhukov (born 1998), Russian radio host and blogger
- Yegor Zhuravlyov (born 1990), Russian ice hockey player

== See also ==
- Jegor
