= 2022 Davis Cup Europe Zone Group III =

Davis Cup competition in 2022

The Europe Zone was the unique zone within Group 3 of the regional Davis Cup competition in 2022. The zone's competition was held in round robin format in Ulcinj, Montenegro, from 22 to 25 June 2022.

== Participating nations ==
- Armenia
- Cyprus
- Georgia
- Liechtenstein
- Luxembourg
- Moldova
- Montenegro
- North Macedonia

== Draw ==
Date: 22–25 June 2022

Location: Tennis Club Bellevue, Ulcinj, Montenegro (clay)

Format: Round-robin basis. Two pools of four teams and nations will play each team once in their group. The two group winners will automatically earn promotion to the World Group II play-offs in 2022.

The two second-placed teams will fight for the third remaining promotion spot. The four teams finishing in third and last place will fight to avoid relegation to Europe Group IV.

=== Seeding ===
Pot	Nation	Rank^{1}	Seed
1	Cyprus	73	1
1	Montenegro	83	2
2	Luxembourg	85	3
2	Georgia	89	4
3	North Macedonia	98	5
3	Armenia	101	6
4	Moldova	119	7
4	Liechtenstein	136	8

- ^{1}Davis Cup Rankings as of 7 March 2022

=== Round Robin ===
==== Pool A ====
		GEO	CYP	ARM	LIE	RR; W–L	Set; W–L	Game; W–L	Standings
4	Georgia		3–0	3–0	3–0	3–0	18–3 (86%)	123–59 (68%)	1
1	Cyprus	0–3		3–0	3–0	2–1	15–6 (71%)	114–58 (66%)	2
6	Armenia	0–3	0–3		3–0	1–2	6–12 (33%)	52–86 (38%)	3
8	Liechtenstein	0–3	0–3	0–3		0–3	0–18 (0%)	23–109 (17%)	4

==== Pool B ====
		LUX	MDA	MKD	MNE	RR; W–L	Set; W–L	Game; W–L	Standings
3	Luxembourg		2–1	2–1	2–1	3–0	14–8 (64%)	125–112 (53%)	1
7	Moldova	1–2		2–1	2–1	2–1	12–9 (57%)	104–94 (53%)	2
5	North Macedonia	1–2	1–2		2–1	1–2	8–11 (42%)	92–105 (47%)	3
2	Montenegro	1–2	1–2	1–2		0–3	8–14 (36%)	104–114 (48%)	4

Standings are determined by: 1. number of wins; 2. number of matches; 3. in two-team ties, head-to-head records; 4. in three-team ties, (a) percentage of sets won (head-to-head records if two teams remain tied), then (b) percentage of games won (head-to-head records if two teams remain tied), then (c) Davis Cup rankings.

=== Playoffs ===
Placing	A Team	Score	B Team
1st–2nd	Georgia	2–0	Luxembourg
Promotion	Cyprus	3–0	Moldova
Relegation	Armenia	0–3	Montenegro
Relegation	Liechtenstein	0–2	North Macedonia

- Georgia, Luxembourg and Cyprus qualify for the 2023 Davis Cup World Group II Play-offs
- Armenia and Liechtenstein are relegated to 2023 Davis Cup Europe Zone Group IV

== Round Robin ==
=== Pool A ===
==== Cyprus vs. Liechtenstein ====
Cyprus
3
Tennis Club Bellevue, Ulcinj, Montenegro
22 June 2022
Clay

Liechtenstein
0

			1	2	3
1	(Cyprus) (Liechtenstein)	Menelaos Efstathiou; Andrej Spasojevic	6; 1	6; 0
2	(Cyprus) (Liechtenstein)	Petros Chrysochos; Gian-Carlo Besimo	6; 0	6; 0
3	(Cyprus) (Liechtenstein)	Sergis Kyratzis / Eleftherios Neos; Eric Peppard / Andrej Spasojevic	6; 0	6; 0

==== Georgia vs. Armenia ====
Georgia
3
Tennis Club Bellevue, Ulcinj, Montenegro
22 June 2022
Clay

Armenia
0

			1	2	3
1	(Georgia (country)) (Armenia)	Aleksandre Bakshi; Ashot Mkrtchyan	6; 2	6; 0
2	(Georgia (country)) (Armenia)	Saba Purtseladze; Sedrak Khachatryan	6; 0	6; 2
3	(Georgia (country)) (Armenia)	Saba Purtseladze / Zura Tkemaladze; Mikayel Avetisyan / Henrik Nikoghosyan	6; 2	6; 3

==== Cyprus vs. Armenia ====
Cyprus
3
Tennis Club Bellevue, Ulcinj, Montenegro
23 June 2022
Clay

Armenia
0

			1	2	3
1	(Cyprus) (Armenia)	Menelaos Efstathiou; Robert Yedigaryan	6; 1	6; 1
2	(Cyprus) (Armenia)	Petros Chrysochos; Mikayel Avetisyan	6; 0	6; 0
3	(Cyprus) (Armenia)	Sergis Kyratzis / Eleftherios Neos; Ashot Mkrtchyan / Henrik Nikoghosyan	6; 2	6; 2

==== Georgia vs. Liechtenstein ====
Georgia
3
Tennis Club Bellevue, Ulcinj, Montenegro
23 June 2022
Clay

Liechtenstein
0

			1	2	3
1	(Georgia (country)) (Liechtenstein)	Aleksandre Bakshi; Eric Peppard	6; 0	6; 2
2	(Georgia (country)) (Liechtenstein)	Saba Purtseladze; Andrej Spasojevic	6; 2	6; 1
3	(Georgia (country)) (Liechtenstein)	Aleksandre Bakshi / Zura Tkemaladze; Gian-Carlo Besimo / Andrej Spasojevic	6; 1	6; 2

==== Cyprus vs. Georgia ====
Cyprus
0
Tennis Club Bellevue, Ulcinj, Montenegro
24 June 2022
Clay

Georgia
3

			1	2	3
1	(Cyprus) (Georgia (country))	Menelaos Efstathiou; Saba Purtseladze	6; 3	2; 6	6^{3} 7^{7}
2	(Cyprus) (Georgia (country))	Petros Chrysochos; Aleksandre Metreveli	6; 4	4; 6	6^{4} 7^{7}
3	(Cyprus) (Georgia (country))	Sergis Kyratzis / Eleftherios Neos; Aleksandre Bakshi / Zura Tkemaladze	1; 6	7^{7} 6^{4}	4; 6

==== Armenia vs. Liechtenstein ====
Armenia
3
Tennis Club Bellevue, Ulcinj, Montenegro
24 June 2022
Clay

Liechtenstein
0

			1	2	3
1	(Armenia) (Liechtenstein)	Sedrak Khachatryan; Andrej Spasojevic	6; 3	6; 1
2	(Armenia) (Liechtenstein)	Mikayel Avetisyan; Gian-Carlo Besimo	6; 2	6; 0
3	(Armenia) (Liechtenstein)	Ashot Mkrtchyan / Henrik Nikoghosyan; Gian-Carlo Besimo / Eric Peppard	6; 2	7^{7} 6^{2}

=== Pool B ===
==== Montenegro vs. Moldova ====
Montenegro
1
Tennis Club Bellevue, Ulcinj, Montenegro
22 June 2022
Clay

Moldova
2

			1	2	3
1	(Montenegro) (Moldova)	Petar Jovanović; Ilya Snițari	4; 6	4; 6
2	(Montenegro) (Moldova)	Rrezart Cungu; Alexander Cozbinov	4; 6	6; 4	6; 2
3	(Montenegro) (Moldova)	Rrezart Cungu / Petar Jovanović; Alexander Cozbinov / Ilya Snițari	6; 3	3; 6	2; 6

==== Luxembourg vs. North Macedonia ====
Luxembourg
2
Tennis Club Bellevue, Ulcinj, Montenegro
22 June 2022
Clay

North Macedonia
1

			1	2	3
1	(Luxembourg) (North Macedonia)	Chris Rodesch; Kalin Ivanovski	6^{2} 7^{7}	7^{7} 6^{5}	4; 6
2	(Luxembourg) (North Macedonia)	Alex Knaff; Gorazd Srbljak	7^{7} 6^{5}	7; 5
3	(Luxembourg) (North Macedonia)	Alex Knaff / Chris Rodesch; Berk Bugarikj / Obrad Markovski	7; 5	6; 4

==== Montenegro vs. North Macedonia ====
Montenegro
1
Tennis Club Bellevue, Ulcinj, Montenegro
23 June 2022
Clay

North Macedonia
2

			1	2	3
1	(Montenegro) (North Macedonia)	Petar Jovanović; Kalin Ivanovski	4; 6	3; 6
2	(Montenegro) (North Macedonia)	Rrezart Cungu; Berk Bugarikj	6; 4	6; 0
3	(Montenegro) (North Macedonia)	Rrezart Cungu / Petar Jovanović; Kalin Ivanovski / Gorazd Srbljak	5; 7	3; 6

==== Luxembourg vs. Moldova ====
Luxembourg
2
Tennis Club Bellevue, Ulcinj, Montenegro
23 June 2022
Clay

Moldova
1

			1	2	3
1	(Luxembourg) (Moldova)	Chris Rodesch; Ilya Snițari	5; 7	3; 6
2	(Luxembourg) (Moldova)	Alex Knaff; Alexander Cozbinov	2; 6	7^{7} 6^{5}	6; 2
3	(Luxembourg) (Moldova)	Alex Knaff / Chris Rodesch; Alexander Cozbinov / Ilya Snițari	6; 1	6; 3

==== Montenegro vs. Luxembourg ====
Montenegro
1
Tennis Club Bellevue, Ulcinj, Montenegro
24 June 2022
Clay

Luxembourg
2

			1	2	3
1	(Montenegro) (Luxembourg)	Danilo Raičević; Raphael Calzi	2; 6	7^{7} 6^{5}	6^{2} 7^{7}
2	(Montenegro) (Luxembourg)	Rrezart Cungu; Alex Knaff	6; 4	3; 6	6; 3
3	(Montenegro) (Luxembourg)	Petar Jovanović / Aleksa Krivokapić; Raphael Calzi / Chris Rodesch	6^{2} 7^{7}	6^{2} 7^{7}

==== North Macedonia vs. Moldova ====
North Macedonia
1
Tennis Club Bellevue, Ulcinj, Montenegro
24 June 2022
Clay

Moldova
2

			1	2	3
1	(North Macedonia) (Moldova)	Kalin Ivanovski; Ilya Snițari	6; 4	7^{7} 6^{5}
2	(North Macedonia) (Moldova)	Gorazd Srbljak; Alexander Cozbinov	2; 6	4; 6
3	(North Macedonia) (Moldova)	Kalin Ivanovski / Gorazd Srbljak; Alexander Cozbinov / Ilya Snițari	4; 6	1; 6

== Play-offs ==
=== Promotional play-offs ===
==== Georgia vs. Luxembourg ====
Georgia
2
Tennis Club Bellevue, Ulcinj, Montenegro
25 June 2022
Clay

Luxembourg
0

			1	2	3
1	(Georgia (country)) (Luxembourg)	Zura Tkemaladze; Raphael Calzi	6; 3	6; 3
2	(Georgia (country)) (Luxembourg)	Saba Purtseladze; Chris Rodesch	2; 6	7^{7} 6^{4}	7^{8} 6^{6}
3	(Georgia (country)) (Luxembourg)	Aleksandre Bakshi / Aleksandre Metreveli; Alex Knaff / Noé Plique				not played

==== Cyprus vs. Moldova ====
Cyprus
3
Tennis Club Bellevue, Ulcinj, Montenegro
25 June 2022
Clay

Moldova
0

			1	2	3
1	(Cyprus) (Moldova)	Menelaos Efstathiou; Ilya Snițari	4; 6	6; 1	6; 2
2	(Cyprus) (Moldova)	Petros Chrysochos; Alexander Cozbinov	6; 1	6; 2
3	(Cyprus) (Moldova)	Stylianos Christodoulou / Sergis Kyratzis; Ilie Cazac / Egor Matvievici	6; 0	6; 1

=== Relegation play-offs ===
==== Armenia vs. Montenegro ====
Armenia
0
Tennis Club Bellevue, Ulcinj, Montenegro
25 June 2022
Clay

Montenegro
3

			1	2	3
1	(Armenia) (Montenegro)	Sedrak Khachatryan; Petar Jovanović	0; 6	2; 6
2	(Armenia) (Montenegro)	Mikayel Avetisyan; Rrezart Cungu	2; 5			retired
3	(Armenia) (Montenegro)	Sedrak Khachatryan / Henrik Nikoghosyan; Petar Jovanović / Danilo Raičević	1; 6	2; 6

==== Liechtenstein vs. North Macedonia ====
Liechtenstein
0
Tennis Club Bellevue, Ulcinj, Montenegro
25 June 2022
Clay

North Macedonia
2

			1	2	3
1	(Liechtenstein) (North Macedonia)	Eric Peppard; Berk Bugarikj	2; 6	0; 6
2	(Liechtenstein) (North Macedonia)	Andrej Spasojevic; Obrad Markovski	0; 6	2; 6
3	(Liechtenstein) (North Macedonia)	Gian-Carlo Besimo / Andrej Spasojevic; Obrad Markovski / Gorazd Srbljak				not played

== Final placements ==
Placing	Teams	
Promoted/First	Georgia	
Promoted/Second	Luxembourg	
Promoted/Third	Cyprus	
Fourth	Moldova	
Fifth	Montenegro	North Macedonia
Relegated/Seventh	Armenia	Liechtenstein

- Georgia, Luxembourg and Cyprus qualify for the 2023 Davis Cup World Group II Play-offs
- Armenia and Liechtenstein are relegated to 2023 Davis Cup Europe Zone Group IV
