= Galyna Moskvitina =

Ukrainian painter

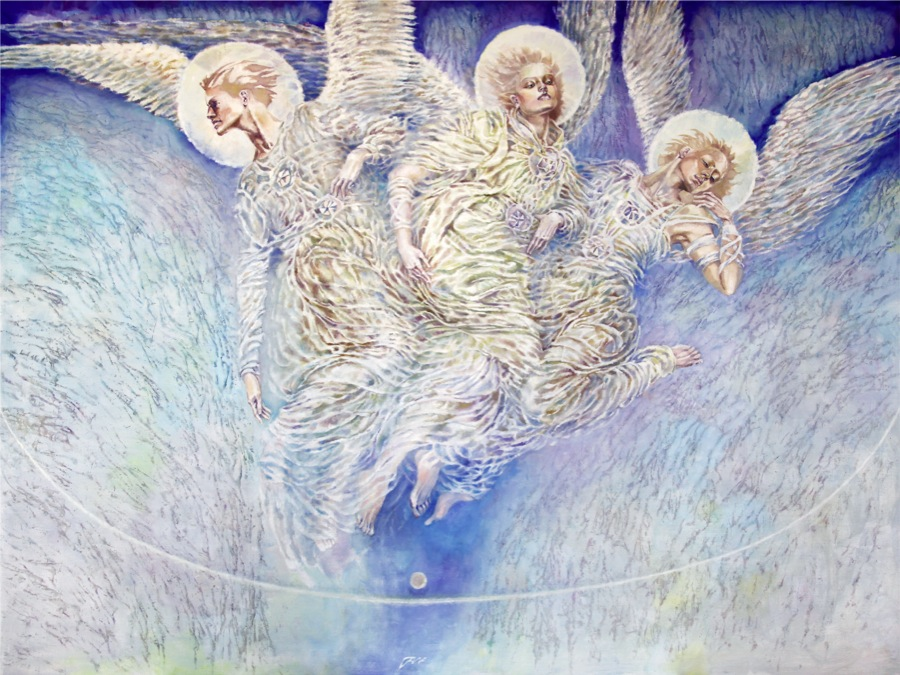
- Born: Kyiv, Ukraine
- Education: Ukrainian Printing and Graphic Institute n.a. Ivan Fedorov
- Known for: Painting
- Movement: Objective art, alternative realism

Galyna Aleksandrovna Moskvitina (Gala) (born 1963) is a Ukrainian painter and founder of the "laternative realism" style. Laternative realism is a creative style based on peculiar perception of light and usage of conceptual images closely associated with notions of light, luminance and luminescence. Moskvitina terms her paintings “svetangs”. According to her, they are a part of adventures of her soul, an expression of her spiritual experiences reflected in pictorial form and dictated by the movement of her soul as well as an expression of the space of light in the objective world.

== Biography ==
Galyna Moskvitina was born in Kyiv. She graduated from Ukrainian Printing and Graphic Institute n.a. Ivan Fedorov qualifying as a graphic artist. Moskvitina belongs to objective artists, representatives of objective art. She works in the alternative realism style.

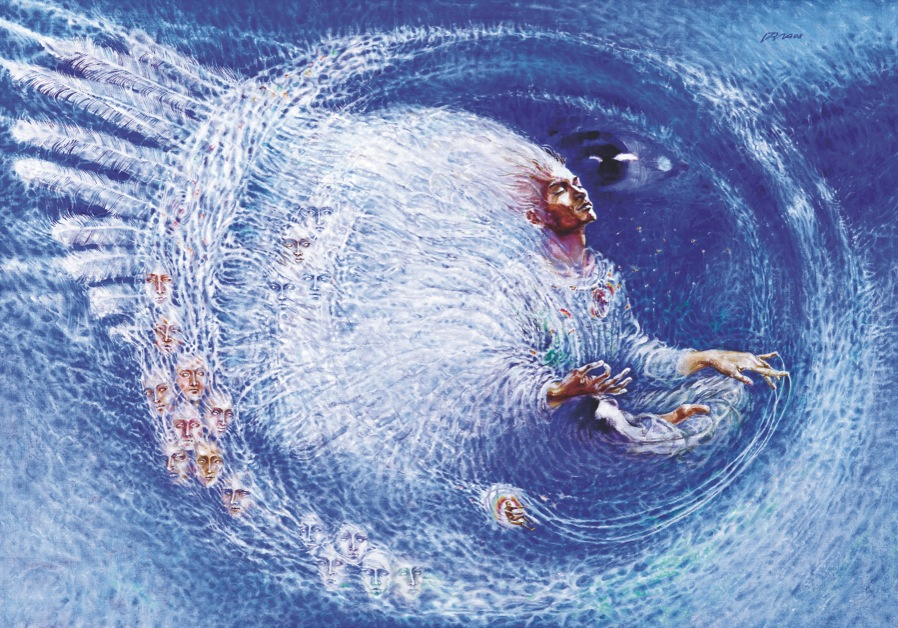
Swing of Zhulai

== Exhibitions ==
- October 2010: Kyiv hosted the first exhibition of Moskvitina's svetangs titled “Angels. Gods. Buddhas”.
- November 2010: Exhibition "A Gift to Light” was held in the Chocolate House, a branch of the National Museum of Russian Art in Kyiv.
- July 21 – September 7, 2011: Exhibition of Moskvitina’s works of the Evolution Project was held in Odesa.
- September 19, 2011: The first exhibition of Moskvitina’s “Code of Light” tour was held in Tel Aviv in the Embassy of Ukraine in Israel.
- October 4, 2011: Preview of the “Code of Light” svetangs and presentation of the album “Angels. Gods. Buddhas” in the Chocolate House in Kyiv.
- October 19–30, 2011: Congress&Expo Center in Milan hosted the second exhibition of the “Code of Light” tour.
- November 7–26, 2011: Hay Hill Gallery in London hosted the third exhibition of the “Code of Light” tour.
- December 7–13, 2011: The branch of National Museum of Russian Art in Kyiv hosted the fourth exhibition of the “Code of Light” tour.
- January 20 - February 21, 2012: "Noviy Vek" Center for Integral Practices hosted the second Evolution Project exhibition by Moskvitina.
- April 25 - May 7, 2012: Alexandre Gertsman Contemporary Art Gallery in New York hosted the fifth exhibition of the “Code of Light” world tour.
- July 26 - September 26, 2012: MAGNAT Equestrian Club hosted Moskvitina's exhibition titled "The meeting of Heaven and Earth" The new Arcane Art Gallery, which exhibits the works of the famous Ukrainian artist Galina Moskvitina, opened on November 27, 2012, in Kyiv.
- December 18, 2012: The Arcane Art Gallery hosted a meeting "Objectivity of the New Age", that featured paintings by Moskvitina.
- January 22, 2013: The Arcane Art Gallery in Kyiv hosted an exhibition "Objective Worlds. Art of Minerals", where Moskvitina's paintings were on display along with a collection of minerals.
- February 19, 2013: The Arcane Art Gallery hosted an opening of a new exhibition by Moskvitina, accompanied by a musical session "Objectivity of Sound".
- March 5, 2013:года в галерее "Arcane Art" состоялось открытие выставки another session from the “Objectivity of Sound” series - "The Singing Tibetan Bowls" - accompanied by a new exhibition by Moskvitina.
- March 26, 2013: The Arcane Art Gallery hosted “A Great Cosmic Year” session featuring artist Galyna Moskvitina and Galyna Poberezhnaya, a famous Ukrainian astrologer.
- April 9, 2013: The Arcane Art Gallery together with the Sophia Publishing House held a session titled “In the Beginning Was the Word” comprising a presentation of the newest books of the publishing house and a new display of Moskvitina’s paintings
- April 23, 2013: Famous Ukrainian designer Elena Golets presented a new autumn/winter 2013/14 collection at the Arcane Art Gallery. A concluding part of the show featured a dress created under the influence and inspiration of Moskvitina’s svetangs displayed at the gallery.
- May 14, 2013: The Arcane Art Gallery held a session “The Harmony of Ancient Traditions and Contemporary Art” giving its participants a unique opportunity to listen to the enchanting sounds of the ancient musical instrument, the semantron, and to enjoy the new paintings by Moskvitina from the “Sundogs” series
- May 28, 2013: The Arcane Art Gallery organized an exhibition “Unity of the internal and external Cosmos. Impressions of the Universe as reflected in science and art”, where the new works of Moskvitina from the Sparkles and the Sundrops series were displayed along with the amazing panoramic pictures made by the Hubble Space Telescope.
- October 12, 2013: The Arcane Art Gallery opened a new display of Galyna Moskvitina's paintings "Objective Worlds: Message of the Trees", dedicated to the beginning of implementation of the Clean Up The World initiative, which brings together 180 countries in an effort to plant more trees and is carried out by the representatives of business community and socially oriented organizations in Kyiv and other cities of Ukraine.
- January 21, 2014: The Arcane Art Gallery opened a new exhibition "Objectivity of cinema. Sergei Parajanov: Through Time. For the 90h anniversary", where new works by Galyna Moskvitina from the «Sundrops» and «Prayer» series were presented along with photos by Yuri Garmash.
- July 22, 2014: The Arcane Art Gallery opened a new exhibition "Moments of Eternity" which presented a new series of Galyna Moskvitina's svetangs titled "AtmAspheric Front"
- September 10, 2014: The Arcane Art Gallery hosted a session "Objective Music", where guests had a chance to enjoy pieces of classical music by S. Bach, B. Marcello, C. Debussy, F. Shubert and F. Kreisler along with "Stream", a new display of Galyna Moskvitina's works.
- November 24, 2014: a new exhibition of Galyna Moskvitina paintings "The Heart of the Matter" opened at the Hay Hill Gallery in London, UK, presenting a collection of the artist's meditative works.

== Auctions ==
On June 8, 2011, Bonhams auction house conducted a Russian sale which featured works by Ukrainian artists for the first time along with traditional masterpieces of Russian pictorial art. Moskvitina's painting “A Dancer’s Dream” was sold for 9,600 pounds.On December 1, 2011, “Ray of Creation” was sold at MacDougall's in London for 6,500 pounds. On November 28, 2012, “Association” was sold at MacDougall's for 11,050 pounds.

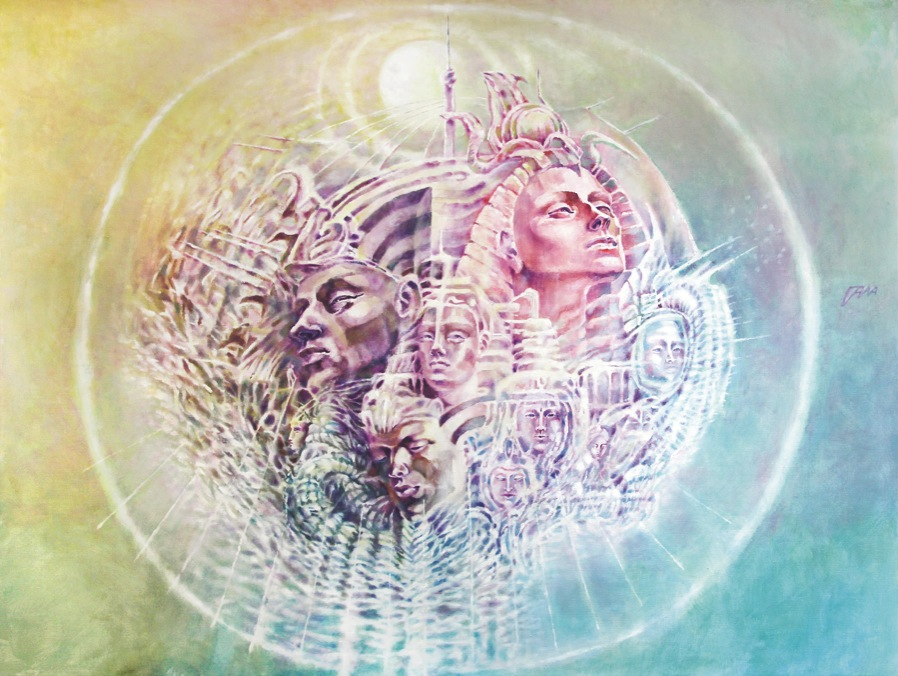
Ship of Ishtar
