= Anastasiya Verbitskaya =

Russian novelist (1861–1928)

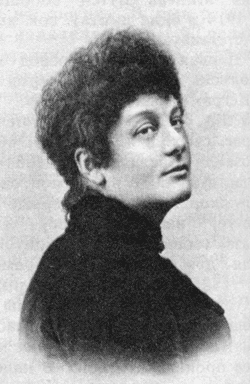
- Born: 22 February 1861; Voronezh, Russia
- Died: 16 January 1928 (aged 66); Moscow, Soviet Union
- Education: Elizavetinsky Women's Institute, Moscow Conservatory
- Children: 4
- Writing career
- Period: 1880s-1920s
- Genres: Fiction, Drama, Movies

Anastasiya Alekseyevna Verbitskaya (Russian: Анастаси́я Алексе́евна Верби́цкая), (22 February 1861 – 16 January 1928), was a Russian novelist, playwright, screenplay writer, publisher and feminist.

== Early life ==
Verbitskaya was born in Voronezh, where her father was a professional military serviceman, and her mother was an amateur actress. In the mid-1870s Verbitskaya attended a boarding school, the Elizavetinsky Women's Institute in Moscow. In 1879 she entered the Moscow Conservatory to study singing, leaving after two years to take a job as a music teacher at her former boarding school. In 1882 she married Alexey Verbitsky, a land surveyor, with whom she had four sons.

== Career ==
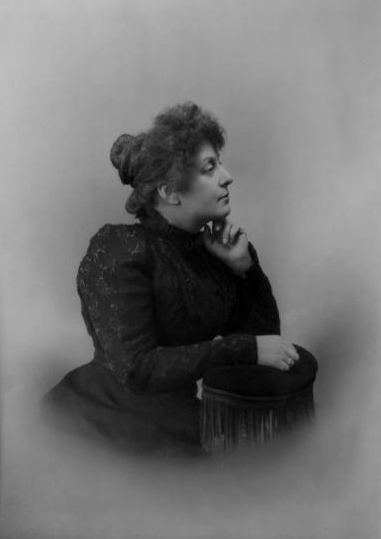
Verbitskaya in 1898.

After her marriage, she worked at various jobs, obtaining her first position at a newspaper in 1883. Her first work of fiction, a novella entitled Discord, appeared in 1887 in the journal Russian Thought. The work espoused the theme of women's liberation, independence and personal fulfillment.

She produced her first novel, Vavochka in 1898. She also wrote plays, including the comedy Mirage (1895), which was staged at the Maly Theater. In 1899, she created her own publishing house, issuing her works and the translated novels of Western European writers dealing with women's issues. The publishing venture turned out to be quite successful. She continued to demonstrate her commitment to the liberation of women through extra-literary activities: She was a member of various charitable and civic organizations that helped women, becoming the chair of the Society for the Betterment of Women's Welfare in 1905.

After the 1905 revolution, with the censorship greatly reduced, she wrote the first of her popular novels, Spirit of the Time (1907–1908). This and her next novel, The Keys to Happiness, in six volumes (1909–1913), were bestsellers. Both novels concerned political, sexual, and artistic revolutions. They both sold in numbers that were unequaled in Verbitskaya's day. She also wrote her two-volume autobiography To My Reader (1908 and 1911) while she was writing The Keys to Happiness.

In 1913 she was invited to write the screenplay for a full-length film based on the novel Keys to Happiness. The film was a great box-office success, leading her into a movie career.

During World War I, she published her best extended prose, the novelette "Elena Pavlovna and Seryozhka," first in a journal for women, then as in book form. This novel has never been reviewed or analyzed. She also published the first two parts of a planned trilogy, "The Yoke of Love," based on the lives of her grandmother and mother (1914–15). They combine fiction and fact. The first volume, sub-titled "The Actress," is particularly interesting as it traces her grandmother's successful acting career and rather modern interpretations of some of Shakespeare's heroines.

== Later life ==
After the Russian Revolution of 1917, her career suffered because of official scorn for her "bourgeois" novels. All her work was forbidden, removed from bookstores and libraries. She continued to write and published some works for children under pseudonyms. She died in Moscow in 1928.

Spirit of the Time was published again in 1993. Three abridged versions of Keys to Happiness were reprinted in Russia in 1993 and 2003. A complete version has never been reissued since 1916. An abridged version of her novel Keys to Happiness was published in English in 1999. The first two parts of The Yoke of Love were reprinted in 1992, 1993 and 1996.

== English translations ==
- Keys to Happiness: A Novel, Beth Holmgren, Helena Goscilo, Indiana University Press, May 1, 1999.

"To My Reader," in: Russia Through Women's Eyes, Toby W. Clyman and Judith Vowles, eds.,Yale University Press, 1996, pp. 335–80. "My Reminiscences: Youth, Dreams," in: Russian Women Writers, Christine D. Tomei, Garland Publishing, 1999, Vol. I, pp. 613–22. "Mirage," Temira Pachmuss,Women in Russian Modernism, 1978, pp. 120–74.
