= 2018 Davis Cup Europe Zone Group III =

International tennis competition

The Europe Zone was the unique zone within Group 3 of the regional Davis Cup competition in 2018. The zone's competition was held in round robin format in two different locations, Plovdiv, Bulgaria and Ulcinj, Montenegro, from 3 to 7 April 2018. The two winning nations won promotion to Group II, Europe/Africa Zone, for 2019.

== Participating nations ==
- Albania
- Andorra
- Armenia
- Bulgaria
- Cyprus
- Greece
- Iceland
- Kosovo
- Latvia
- Liechtenstein
- Macedonia
- Malta
- Moldova
- Monaco
- Montenegro
- San Marino

=== Inactive nation ===
- Azerbaijan

== Draw ==
Date: 3–7 April

Location 1: Tennis Club Lokomotiv, Plovdiv, Bulgaria (clay)
Location 2: Ulcinj Bellevue, Ulcinj, Montenegro (clay)

Format: Round-robin basis. Two pools of four teams at each venue. The winners of each pool play-off against each other to determine which nation will be promoted to Europe/Africa Zone Group II in 2019. Two promoted – one from each venue.

=== Seeding ===
Pot	Nation	Rank^{1}	Seed
1	Bulgaria	59	1
1	Monaco	70	2
1	Latvia	71	3
1	Moldova	76	4
2	Macedonia	81	5
2	Montenegro	84	6
2	Malta	101	7
2	Liechtenstein	101	8
3	Cyprus	106	9
3	Greece	107	10
3	Iceland	108	11
3	Andorra	116	12
4	Armenia	117	13
4	Albania	122	14
4	San Marino	126	15
4	Kosovo	132	16

- ^{1}Davis Cup Rankings as of 5 February 2018

=== Draw ===
==== Pool A (Plovdiv) ====
		BUL	MKD	ISL	ALB	RR; W–L	Set; W–L	Game; W–L	Standings
1	Bulgaria		3–0	3–0	3–0	3–0	18–0 (100%)	108–21 (84%)	1
5	Macedonia	0–3		2–1	3–0	2–1	10–8 (56%)	83–63 (57%)	2
11	Iceland	0–3	1–2		2–1	1–2	6–13 (32%)	63–95 (40%)	3
14	Albania	0–3	0–3	1–2		0–3	3–16 (16%)	33–108 (23%)	4

==== Pool B (Plovdiv) ====
		MON	CYP	AND	SMR	RR; W–L	Set; W–L	Game; W–L	Standings
2	Monaco		2–1	3–0	3–0	3–0	17–3 (85%)	111–37 (75%)	1
9	Cyprus	1–2		3–0	2–1	2–1	13–7 (65%)	99–60 (62%)	2
12	Andorra	0–3	0–3		2–1	1–2	4–14 (22%)	41–92 (31%)	3
15	San Marino	0–3	1–2	1–2		0–3	4–14 (22%)	36–98 (27%)	4

==== Pool C (Ulcinj) ====
		MNE	GRE	LAT	ARM	RR; W–L	Set; W–L	Game; W–L	Standings
6	Montenegro		2–1	2–1	3–0	3–0	14–4 (78%)	103–55 (65%)	1
10	Greece	1–2		2–1	3–0	2–1	12–6 (67%)	92–70 (57%)	2
3	Latvia	1–2	1–2		2–1	1–2	8–10 (44%)	79–83 (49%)	3
13	Armenia	0–3	0–3	1–2		0–3	2–16 (11%)	35–101 (26%)	4

==== Pool D (Ulcinj) ====
		MLT	MDA	LIE	KOS	RR; W–L	Set; W–L	Game; W–L	Standings
7	Malta		2–1	1–2	3–0	2–1	13–6 (68%)	97–61 (61%)	1
4	Moldova	1–2		3–0	2–1	2–1	13–7 (65%)	99–76 (57%)	2
8	Liechtenstein	2–1	0–3		3–0	2–1	10–10 (50%)	97–89 (52%)	3
16	Kosovo	0–3	1–2	0–3		0–3	4–17 (19%)	51–118 (30%)	4

Standings are determined by: 1. number of wins; 2. number of matches; 3. in two-team ties, head-to-head records; 4. in three-team ties, (a) percentage of sets won (head-to-head records if two teams remain tied), then (b) percentage of games won (head-to-head records if two teams remain tied), then (c) Davis Cup rankings.

=== Playoffs ===
Placing (Plovdiv)	A Team	Score	B Team
1st–2nd	Bulgaria	1–2	Monaco
3rd–4th	Macedonia	2–0	Cyprus
5th–6th	Iceland	3–0	Andorra
7th–8th	Albania	0–2	San Marino

Placing (Ulcinj)	A Team	Score	B Team
Promotional	Montenegro	3–0	Malta
3rd–4th	Greece	3–0	Moldova
5th–6th	Latvia	3–0	Liechtenstein
7th–8th	Armenia	3–0	Kosovo

Monaco and Montenegro promoted to Group II in 2019.

== Round Robin ==
=== Pool A (Plovdiv) ===
==== Bulgaria vs. Albania ====
Bulgaria
3
Tennis Club Lokomotiv, Plovdiv, Bulgaria
4 April
Clay

Albania
0

			1	2	3
1	(Bulgaria) (Albania)	Adrian Andreev; Mario Zili	6; 1	6; 0
2	(Bulgaria) (Albania)	Dimitar Kuzmanov; Elbi Mjeshtri	6; 0	6; 0
3	(Bulgaria) (Albania)	Dimitar Kuzmanov / Vasko Mladenov; Elbi Mjeshtri / Genajd Shypheja	6; 0	6; 0

==== Macedonia vs. Iceland ====
North Macedonia
2
Tennis Club Lokomotiv, Plovdiv, Bulgaria
4 April
Clay

Iceland
1

			1	2	3
1	(North Macedonia) (Iceland)	Gorazd Srbljak; Egill Sigurðsson	6; 0	6; 2
2	(North Macedonia) (Iceland)	Dimitar Grabul; Birkir Gunnarsson	6; 2	6; 3
3	(North Macedonia) (Iceland)	Gjorgji Jankulovski / Stefan Micov; Anton Magnússon / Egill Sigurðsson	6^{2} 7^{7}	4; 6

==== Bulgaria vs. Iceland ====
Bulgaria
3
Tennis Club Lokomotiv, Plovdiv, Bulgaria
5 April
Clay

Iceland
0

			1	2	3
1	(Bulgaria) (Iceland)	Alexandar Lazov; Egill Sigurðsson	6; 1	6; 1
2	(Bulgaria) (Iceland)	Dimitar Kuzmanov; Anton Magnússon	6; 1	6; 1
3	(Bulgaria) (Iceland)	Dimitar Kuzmanov / Vasko Mladenov; Birkir Gunnarsson / Egill Sigurðsson	6; 2	6; 1

==== Macedonia vs. Albania ====
North Macedonia
3
Tennis Club Lokomotiv, Plovdiv, Bulgaria
5 April
Clay

Albania
0

			1	2	3
1	(North Macedonia) (Albania)	Gorazd Srbljak; Arber Sulstarova	6; 0	6; 0
2	(North Macedonia) (Albania)	Dimitar Grabul; Mario Zili	6; 3	6; 0
3	(North Macedonia) (Albania)	Gjorgji Jankulovski / Stefan Micov; Elbi Mjeshtri / Genajd Shypheja	6; 2	6; 2

==== Bulgaria vs. Macedonia ====
Bulgaria
3
Tennis Club Lokomotiv, Plovdiv, Bulgaria
6 April
Clay

North Macedonia
0

			1	2	3
1	(Bulgaria) (North Macedonia)	Alexandar Lazov; Gorazd Srbljak	6; 1	6; 1
2	(Bulgaria) (North Macedonia)	Dimitar Kuzmanov; Dimitar Grabul	6; 2	6; 2
3	(Bulgaria) (North Macedonia)	Adrian Andreev / Vasko Mladenov; Stefan Micov / Gorazd Srbljak	6; 4	6; 3

==== Iceland vs. Albania ====
Iceland
2
Tennis Club Lokomotiv, Plovdiv, Bulgaria
6 April
Clay

Albania
1

			1	2	3
1	(Iceland) (Albania)	Egill Sigurðsson; Genajd Shypheja	6; 1	6; 1
2	(Iceland) (Albania)	Birkir Gunnarsson; Elbi Mjeshtri	5; 7	3; 6
3	(Iceland) (Albania)	Birkir Gunnarsson / Egill Sigurðsson; Genajd Shypheja / Mario Zili	6; 2	4; 6	6; 2

=== Pool B (Plovdiv) ===
==== Monaco vs. San Marino ====
Monaco
3
Tennis Club Lokomotiv, Plovdiv, Bulgaria
4 April
Clay

San Marino
0

			1	2	3
1	(Monaco) (San Marino)	Romain Arneodo; Filippo Tommesani	6; 0	6; 0
2	(Monaco) (San Marino)	Lucas Catarina; Tommaso Simoncini	6; 0	6; 0
3	(Monaco) (San Marino)	Benjamin Balleret / Thomas Oger; Antoine Barbieri / Tommaso Simoncini	6; 0	6; 0

==== Cyprus vs. Andorra ====
Cyprus
3
Tennis Club Lokomotiv, Plovdiv, Bulgaria
4 April
Clay

Andorra
0

			1	2	3
1	(Cyprus) (Andorra)	Petros Chrysochos; Guillermo Jauregui	6; 0	6; 0
2	(Cyprus) (Andorra)	Menelaos Efstathiou; Èric Cervós Noguer	6; 0	6; 0
3	(Cyprus) (Andorra)	Nicholas Campbell / Eleftherios Neos; Èric Cervós Noguer / Guillermo Jauregui	6; 2	6; 3

==== Monaco vs. Andorra ====
Monaco
3
Tennis Club Lokomotiv, Plovdiv, Bulgaria
5 April
Clay

Andorra
0

			1	2	3
1	(Monaco) (Andorra)	Romain Arneodo; Jean-Baptiste Poux-Gautier	6; 3	6; 1
2	(Monaco) (Andorra)	Lucas Catarina; Guillermo Jauregui	6; 0	6; 1
3	(Monaco) (Andorra)	Benjamin Balleret / Thomas Oger; Èric Cervós Noguer / Guillermo Jauregui	6; 0	6; 2

==== Cyprus vs. San Marino ====
Cyprus
2
Tennis Club Lokomotiv, Plovdiv, Bulgaria
5 April
Clay

San Marino
1

			1	2	3
1	(Cyprus) (San Marino)	Petros Chrysochos; Antoine Barbieri	6; 1	6; 0
2	(Cyprus) (San Marino)	Menelaos Efstathiou; Marco de Rossi	4; 6	5; 7
3	(Cyprus) (San Marino)	Petros Chrysochos / Eleftherios Neos; Tommaso Simoncini / Filippo Tommesani	6; 1	6; 1

==== Monaco vs. Cyprus ====
Monaco
2
Tennis Club Lokomotiv, Plovdiv, Bulgaria
6 April
Clay

Cyprus
1

			1	2	3
1	(Monaco) (Cyprus)	Romain Arneodo; Petros Chrysochos	6; 3	1; 6	3; 6
2	(Monaco) (Cyprus)	Lucas Catarina; Menelaos Efstathiou	5; 7	6; 1	6; 2
3	(Monaco) (Cyprus)	Romain Arneodo / Benjamin Balleret; Petros Chrysochos / Eleftherios Neos	6; 2	6; 3

==== Andorra vs. San Marino ====
Andorra
2
Tennis Club Lokomotiv, Plovdiv, Bulgaria
6 April
Clay

San Marino
1

			1	2	3
1	(Andorra) (San Marino)	Jean-Baptiste Poux-Gautier; Filippo Tommesani	6; 1	6; 0
2	(Andorra) (San Marino)	Èric Cervós Noguer; Marco de Rossi	3; 6	1; 6
3	(Andorra) (San Marino)	Jean-Baptiste Poux-Gautier / Laurent Recouderc; Marco de Rossi / Filippo Tommesani	7; 5	6; 2

=== Pool C (Ulcinj) ===
==== Latvia vs. Greece ====
Latvia
1
Ulcinj Bellevue, Ulcinj, Montenegro
4 April
Clay

Greece
2

			1	2	3
1	(Latvia) (Greece)	Roberts Grīnvalds; Ioannis Stergiou	0; 6	4; 6
2	(Latvia) (Greece)	Mārtiņš Podžus; Markos Kalovelonis	3; 6	4; 6
3	(Latvia) (Greece)	Artūrs Lazdiņš / Mārtiņš Podžus; Markos Kalovelonis / Ioannis Stergiou	7; 5	6; 3

==== Montenegro vs. Armenia ====
Montenegro
3
Ulcinj Bellevue, Ulcinj, Montenegro
4 April
Clay

Armenia
0

			1	2	3
1	(Montenegro) (Armenia)	Rrezart Cungu; Torgom Asatryan	6; 3	6; 0
2	(Montenegro) (Armenia)	Ljubomir Čelebić; Sedrak Khachatryan	6; 0	6; 0
3	(Montenegro) (Armenia)	Ljubomir Čelebić / Rrezart Cungu; Sedrak Khachatryan / Henrik Nikoghosyan	6; 1	6; 1

==== Latvia vs. Montenegro ====
Latvia
1
Ulcinj Bellevue, Ulcinj, Montenegro
5 April
Clay

Montenegro
2

			1	2	3
1	(Latvia) (Montenegro)	Artūrs Lazdiņš; Rrezart Cungu	3; 6	1; 6
2	(Latvia) (Montenegro)	Mārtiņš Podžus; Ljubomir Čelebić	4; 6	5; 7
3	(Latvia) (Montenegro)	Roberts Grīnvalds / Mārtiņš Rocēns; Stefan Dragović / Pavle Rogan	7; 5	6; 3

==== Greece vs. Armenia ====
Greece
3
Ulcinj Bellevue, Ulcinj, Montenegro
5 April
Clay

Armenia
0

			1	2	3
1	(Greece) (Armenia)	Alexandros Skorilas; Henrik Nikoghosyan	6; 3	6; 3
2	(Greece) (Armenia)	Ioannis Stergiou; Sedrak Khachatryan	6; 1	6; 3
3	(Greece) (Armenia)	Markos Kalovelonis / Petros Tsitsipas; Torgom Asatryan / Sedrak Khachatryan	6; 1	6; 1

==== Latvia vs. Armenia ====
Latvia
2
Ulcinj Bellevue, Ulcinj, Montenegro
6 April
Clay

Armenia
1

			1	2	3
1	(Latvia) (Armenia)	Mārtiņš Rocēns; Torgom Asatryan	6; 3	6; 1
2	(Latvia) (Armenia)	Mārtiņš Podžus; Sedrak Khachatryan	6; 0	6; 1
3	(Latvia) (Armenia)	Roberts Grīnvalds / Mārtiņš Rocēns; Sedrak Khachatryan / Henrik Nikoghosyan	5; 3			retired

==== Montenegro vs. Greece ====
Montenegro
2
Ulcinj Bellevue, Ulcinj, Montenegro
6 April
Clay

Greece
1

			1	2	3
1	(Montenegro) (Greece)	Rrezart Cungu; Ioannis Stergiou	7^{7} 6^{2}	6; 2
2	(Montenegro) (Greece)	Ljubomir Čelebić; Markos Kalovelonis	6; 2	6; 1
3	(Montenegro) (Greece)	Stefan Dragović / Pavle Rogan; Ioannis Stergiou / Petros Tsitsipas	5; 7	4; 6

=== Pool D (Ulcinj) ===
==== Moldova vs. Liechtenstein ====
Moldova
3
Ulcinj Bellevue, Ulcinj, Montenegro
4 April
Clay

Liechtenstein
0

			1	2	3
1	(Moldova) (Liechtenstein)	Egor Matvievici; Timo Kranz	7^{7} 6^{4}	6; 2
2	(Moldova) (Liechtenstein)	Vasilii Dontu; Vital Flurin Leuch	7; 5	6; 4
3	(Moldova) (Liechtenstein)	Vasilii Dontu / Egor Matvievici; Robin Forster / Serafin Zünd	6; 2	6; 3

==== Malta vs. Kosovo ====
Malta
3
Ulcinj Bellevue, Ulcinj, Montenegro
4 April
Clay

Kosovo
0

			1	2	3
1	(Malta) (Kosovo)	Omar Sudzuka; Burim Bytyqi	6; 4	6; 1
2	(Malta) (Kosovo)	Matthew Asciak; Granit Bajraliu	6; 0	6; 2
3	(Malta) (Kosovo)	Matthew Asciak / Matthew Cassar Torregiani; Burim Bytyqi / Muhamed Zulji	6; 0	6; 0

==== Moldova vs. Malta ====
Moldova
1
Ulcinj Bellevue, Ulcinj, Montenegro
5 April
Clay

Malta
2

			1	2	3
1	(Moldova) (Malta)	Maxim Bulat; Omar Sudzuka	6; 2	6; 1
2	(Moldova) (Malta)	Alexandr Vitcov; Matthew Asciak	1; 6	2; 6
3	(Moldova) (Malta)	Vasilii Dontu / Egor Matvievici; Matthew Asciak / Omar Sudzuka	3; 6	2; 6

==== Liechtenstein vs. Kosovo ====
Liechtenstein
3
Ulcinj Bellevue, Ulcinj, Montenegro
5 April
Clay

Kosovo
0

			1	2	3
1	(Liechtenstein) (Kosovo)	Timo Kranz; Burim Bytyqi	5; 7	6; 2	6; 2
2	(Liechtenstein) (Kosovo)	Vital Flurin Leuch; Granit Bajraliu	6; 0	6; 1
3	(Liechtenstein) (Kosovo)	Robin Forster / Serafin Zünd; Burim Bytyqi / Muhamed Zulji	6; 3	6; 2

==== Moldova vs. Kosovo ====
Moldova
2
Ulcinj Bellevue, Ulcinj, Montenegro
6 April
Clay

Kosovo
1

			1	2	3
1	(Moldova) (Kosovo)	Vasilii Dontu; Granit Bajraliu	6; 0	3; 6	5; 7
2	(Moldova) (Kosovo)	Alexandr Vitcov; Genc Selita	6; 1	3; 6	6; 1
3	(Moldova) (Kosovo)	Vasilii Dontu / Egor Matvievici; Granit Bajraliu / Genc Selita	6; 3	6; 3

==== Malta vs. Liechtenstein ====
Malta
1
Ulcinj Bellevue, Ulcinj, Montenegro
6 April
Clay

Liechtenstein
2

			1	2	3
1	(Malta) (Liechtenstein)	Omar Sudzuka; Robin Forster	3; 6	4; 6
2	(Malta) (Liechtenstein)	Matthew Asciak; Vital Flurin Leuch	7^{7} 6^{3}	6; 1
3	(Malta) (Liechtenstein)	Matthew Asciak / Omar Sudzuka; Timo Kranz / Vital Flurin Leuch	6; 3	4; 6	4; 6

== Play-offs ==
=== 1st to 2nd play-offs ===
==== Bulgaria vs. Monaco ====
Bulgaria
1
Tennis Club Lokomotiv, Plovdiv, Bulgaria
7 April
Clay

Monaco
2

			1	2	3
1	(Bulgaria) (Monaco)	Alexandar Lazov; Romain Arneodo	4; 6	4; 6
2	(Bulgaria) (Monaco)	Dimitar Kuzmanov; Lucas Catarina	6; 2	6; 1
3	(Bulgaria) (Monaco)	Dimitar Kuzmanov / Vasko Mladenov; Romain Arneodo / Benjamin Balleret	4; 6	3; 6

==== Montenegro vs. Malta ====
Montenegro
3
Ulcinj Bellevue, Ulcinj, Montenegro
7 April
Clay

Malta
0

			1	2	3
1	(Montenegro) (Malta)	Rrezart Cungu; Denzil Agius	6; 0	6; 0
2	(Montenegro) (Malta)	Ljubomir Čelebić; Matthew Asciak	6; 2	6; 2
3	(Montenegro) (Malta)	Stefan Dragović / Pavle Rogan; Denzil Agius / Matthew Cassar Torregiani	6; 3	6; 2

=== 3rd to 4th play-offs ===
==== Macedonia vs. Cyprus ====
North Macedonia
2
Tennis Club Lokomotiv, Plovdiv, Bulgaria
7 April
Clay

Cyprus
0

			1	2	3
1	(North Macedonia) (Cyprus)	Gorazd Srbljak; Nicholas Campbell	6; 1	6; 2
2	(North Macedonia) (Cyprus)	Dimitar Grabul; Menelaos Efstathiou	6; 1	5; 7	7^{7} 6^{5}
3	(North Macedonia) (Cyprus)	Dimitar Grabul / Stefan Micov; Menelaos Efstathiou / Eleftherios Neos				not played

==== Greece vs. Moldova ====
Greece
3
Ulcinj Bellevue, Ulcinj, Montenegro
7 April
Clay

Moldova
0

			1	2	3
1	(Greece) (Moldova)	Petros Tsitsipas; Egor Matvievici	6; 1	6; 1
2	(Greece) (Moldova)	Alexandros Skorilas; Maxim Bulat	6; 1	6; 4
3	(Greece) (Moldova)	Alexandros Skorilas / Petros Tsitsipas; Maxim Bulat / Alexandr Vitcov	7; 5	0; 0		retired

=== 5th to 6th play-offs ===
==== Iceland v Andorra ====
Iceland
3
Tennis Club Lokomotiv, Plovdiv, Bulgaria
7 April
Clay

Andorra
0

			1	2	3
1	(Iceland) (Andorra)	Anton Magnússon; Guillermo Jauregui	6; 3	6; 0
2	(Iceland) (Andorra)	Birkir Gunnarsson; Èric Cervós Noguer	2; 6	6; 2	6; 3
3	(Iceland) (Andorra)	Vladimir Ristic / Egill Sigurðsson; Èric Cervós Noguer / Guillermo Jauregui	6; 1	6; 3

==== Latvia vs. Liechtenstein ====
Latvia
3
Ulcinj Bellevue, Ulcinj, Montenegro
7 April
Clay

Liechtenstein
0

			1	2	3
1	(Latvia) (Liechtenstein)	Roberts Grīnvalds; Serafin Zünd	6; 0	6; 0
2	(Latvia) (Liechtenstein)	Mārtiņš Podžus; Vital Flurin Leuch	6; 0	6; 4
3	(Latvia) (Liechtenstein)	Roberts Grīnvalds / Mārtiņš Podžus; Robin Forster / Vital Flurin Leuch	6; 1	6; 3

=== 7th to 8th play-offs ===
==== Albania vs. San Marino ====
Albania
0
Tennis Club Lokomotiv, Plovdiv, Bulgaria
7 April
Clay

San Marino
2

			1	2	3
1	(Albania) (San Marino)	Genajd Shypheja; Filippo Tommesani	2; 6	2; 6
2	(Albania) (San Marino)	Mario Zili; Antoine Barbieri	4; 6	1; 6
3	(Albania) (San Marino)	Genajd Shypheja / Mario Zili; Marco de Rossi / Filippo Tommesani				not played

==== Armenia vs. Kosovo ====
Armenia
3
Ulcinj Bellevue, Ulcinj, Montenegro
7 April
Clay

Kosovo
0

			1	2	3
1	(Armenia) (Kosovo)	Henrik Nikoghosyan; Granit Bajraliu	6; 1	7^{11} 6^{9}
2	(Armenia) (Kosovo)	Sedrak Khachatryan; Genc Selita	6; 2	6; 1
3	(Armenia) (Kosovo)	Torgom Asatryan / Sedrak Khachatryan; Granit Bajraliu / Burim Bytyqi	6; 2	6; 1
