= Jegor =

Jegor is a given name and surname, sometimes a spelling variant of "Yegor". Notable people with the name include:

- Jegor Solovjov (1871–1942), Estonian politician
- Piotr Jegor (1968–2020), Polish footballer
- Jeremija Ilić Jegor (1919-1941), Serbian World War II resistance fighter
