= Yegor Chernyshov =

Yegor Chernyshov may refer to:

- Yegor Chernyshov (footballer, born 1997), Russian football defender for FC Tom Tomsk
- Yegor Chernyshov (footballer, born 1998), Russian football midfielder for Ocean Kerch
