= Igor Vulokh =

Russian artist (1938-2012)

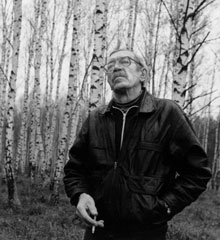
- Born: 3 January 1938; Kazan, Tatarstan, Russian Federation, the Soviet Union
- Died: 3 January 2012 (aged 74)
- Education: KCU them. NI Fechin
- Style: Abstract Expressionism
- Title: USSR Union of Artists
- Awards: State Prize of Ministry of Culture
- Website: www.vulokh.com

Igor Vulokh (3 January 1938 – 28 November 2012) was a Russian nonconformist artist active during the 1960s, recognized as a leading exponent of abstraction in 20th-century Russian art.

== Biography ==
=== Early life ===
Igor Vulokh was born in Kazan on 3 January 1938. His childhood and early youth spanned the Second World War and post-war years. His father, Alexander, served in the war, while his mother, Lidia, struggled to care for the family alone. After Alexander's death in 1942, Lidia was hospitalized due to hunger and exhaustion. Unaware of his mother’s condition, Vulokh was placed in a children's home. Following the war, Lidia located and reunited with him after an extensive search.

=== Education and early career ===
From an early age, Vulokh demonstrated a talent for art. His first sketches, noted for their vivid clarity, impressed teachers at the Kazan Art School, where he studied painting from 1953 to 1958. During this period, he was deeply influenced by his mentor Victor Podursky, a professor at the Shanghai Art Academy and expert in East Asian art. Vulokh gained initial recognition in 1957 when his landscape Winter was exhibited at the All-Soviet Art Exhibition in Moscow Manege. The work received positive reviews from Soviet sculptor Sergei Konenkov and painter Konstantin Yuon in international publications.

=== Move to Moscow ===
Vulokh applied to the Surikov Institute in Moscow but was denied admission. With support from the renowned painter Georgy Nissky, he instead enrolled in the art department of the All-Soviet State Institute of Cinematography (VGIK). The VGIK dormitory became a hub for creative exchange; his roommate, Naum Kleiman (later director of the Museum of Cinema), and writer Vasily Shukshin became close associates.

During visits to the Pushkin Museum of Fine Arts, Vulokh met artist Anatoly Zverev, whose unconventional and vibrant style captivated him. The two bonded over their shared passion for painting, forming a lasting friendship. Around this time, Vulokh married Kira Viktorova.

=== Artistic development ===
The 1957 VI International Youth Festival in Moscow, held in Sokolniki Park, featured exhibitions at the U.S. and French pavilions, including a retrospective of Pablo Picasso. While Vulokh found his studies at VGIK intellectually stimulating—particularly access to rare films—he chafed against coursework tied to Soviet ideological dogma and filmmaking conventions. In 1960, he left the institute to pursue independent artistic exploration.

== Collaborations and connections ==
=== Partnership with Gennady Aigi ===
In 1961, Vulokh met poet Gennady Aigi at the home of Naum Kleiman, then an employee of the State Film Foundation in Belye Stolby. The two formed a prolific artist-poet duo: Vulokh created a series of sketches inspired by Aigi's poetry, while Aigi dedicated a cycle of poems to Vulokh. They later collaborated as editors of the 1961 catalog Mayakovsky Artist. Aigi, deeply knowledgeable about early avant-garde movements, studied both suppressed and overlooked literary works. His role at the Mayakovsky Museum brought him into contact with avant-garde scholars Nikolai Khardzhiev and Aleksei Kruchenykh, who curated exhibitions featuring 1920s artists such as Vladimir Tatlin, Kazimir Malevich, Mikhail Larionov, Natalia Goncharova, and Vladimir Filinov. Vulokh maintained a close relationship with Khardzhiev, whose ideas significantly influenced his artistic development.

The duo co-published numerous books in Russia and abroad. In 1989, Aigi’s poetry cycle Veronika’s Notebook (translated by Peter France) was released in England, featuring illustrations by Vulokh. A subsequent collection of Aigi’s poems dedicated to Vulokh, titled Friend of These Years (1998), also included illustrations by the artist.

=== Avant-Garde Networks and Exhibitions ===
The 1960s brought growing international attention to Soviet nonconformist art. Danish art historian Troels Andersen, then residing in Moscow and later director of the Museum Jorn in Silkeborg, became a key advocate for the Russian avant-garde. Andersen authored a four-volume study on Kazimir Malevich and organized a major retrospective of the artist’s work in New York.

In 1961, Vulokh held his first solo exhibition at the Exhibition Hall of the Union of Artists in Moscow. That same year, he joined the youth section of the Moscow Union of Artists, solidifying his professional standing.

=== Association with George Kostakis ===
Vulokh became acquainted with renowned art collector George Kostaki, whose Moscow apartment was famed for its extensive collection of 1920s Russian avant-garde works. The two developed a close friendship beginning in 1968.

== Artistic evolution: The White Period ==
In 1968, Vulokh began creating minimalist white paintings, a theme he would revisit periodically throughout his career. These subtle works, characterized by pale tonal variations, came to define his "White Period." Concurrently, his spiritual exploration and study of theological texts led him to the Moscow Theological Academy (then located at the Trinity-Sergius Monastery), where he worked as an assistant in the Department of Western Religions. Despite his academic engagement, Vulokh remained artistically active, exploring diverse techniques and styles in painting.

== Collaborations and contrasts ==
=== Membership in the USSR Union of Artists ===
Vulokh joined the Moscow branch of the USSR Union of Artists in 1971. Membership granted him financial stability and the freedom to focus on his art full-time, bypassing the constraints of a conventional nine-to-five job.

=== Partnership with Vyacheslav Klykov ===
Despite Vulokh’s reserved, almost austere demeanor and methodical creative process, he attracted collaborators who resonated with his vision. Sculptor Vyacheslav Klykov, a physically robust and energetically proactive figure, stood in stark contrast to Vulokh’s introspective nature. In 1979, Klykov organized a joint exhibition of their work—a bold gesture during a politically restrictive era. A catalog documenting Vulokh’s contributions to the show survives, and several of his pieces from the exhibition later entered the collection of the Russian Museum in Saint Petersburg.

Over time, ideological and artistic differences emerged between the two. By the early 1980s, their partnership dissolved, though both continued to pursue independent careers.

== Personal life and later career ==
=== Marriage and family ===
In 1983, Vulokh met artist Natalya Tukolkina-Okhota, at the Moscow home of Vasily Grigoriev (son of filmmakers Renita and Yuri Grigoriev), which he regularly visited. Tukolkina-Okhota was already familiar with Vulokh's work prior to their meeting. The couple married shortly thereafter, and their daughter was born in 1985.

=== Critical recognition ===
In 1988, Danish art historian Troels Andersen published the first monograph on Vulokh's art in Denmark, titled Igor Vulokh: Paintings and Drawings. At the time, Vulokh's work remained largely unrecognized within official Soviet cultural circles. The monograph featured a preface by poet Gennady Aigi titled Twelve Parallels to Igor Vulokh, which analyzed the artist's thematic and philosophical influences. Andersen's text highlighted Vulokh's connection to both European modernism and Russian traditions:

Vulokh's works bring to mind such widely different artists as Morandi, Fautrier and de Staël - but they have above all, in spite of all the breaks and all isolation, come out of the Russian tradition. They live in the conflicts between abstraction and the experience of nature, the pictures are now signs, now vibrant expressions of a spiritual condition.

== International recognition and legacy ==
=== Exhibitions and acquisitions ===
The Moscow-based Segodnya Gallery, among the first to promote works of the 1960s nonconformist artists, played a pivotal role in introducing Russian art to international audiences through participation in global art fairs. Vulokh's solo exhibition at the gallery marked his first widespread exposure to the Russian public, with several works subsequently acquired by the State Tretyakov Gallery. During this period, Western interest in Soviet art surged. In 1991, Vulokh traveled to West Berlin for a solo exhibition at the Brauner and Popov Gallery. Two years later, he and his wife, Natalya Tukolkina-Okhota, received a fellowship from the Brandenburg Ministry of Culture, enabling a residency at Wiepersdorf Castle in Germany—a program reserved for internationally renowned artists.

=== Collaborations and artistic exchange ===
In 1994, Vulokh created a series of graphic illustrations for Swedish Nobel laureate Tomas Tranströmer's poetry, later exhibited at the Tranströmer Poetry Festival on Gotland, Sweden. During his residency in Germany, Vulokh requested that the Brandenburg administration donate his Wiepersdorf-produced paintings to the Silkeborg Museum of Art (now Museum Jorn) in Denmark, then directed by Troels Andersen. This initiative led to a solo exhibition in Denmark, where Vulokh engaged with the museum’s extensive archives on international art history. The experience provided both scholarly insight and artistic inspiration.

== Awards and late career recognition ==
=== State Prize nomination ===
In 1996, the Russian Ministry of Culture nominated Vulokh for the State Prize, a significant milestone as the award had historically been reserved for proponents of socialist realism during the Soviet era. This marked the first time an underground artist received official recognition of this kind, signaling a shift in state cultural policy.

=== Patronage of Urs R. Haener ===
During the mid-1990s, Swiss banker and art collector Urs R. Haener, alongside gallery owner Nadja Brykina, visited Vulokh's studio to study his works and discuss their origins. Haener’s deep expertise in contemporary art and dedication to promoting Vulokh's oeuvre internationally impressed the artist. Over the following decade, Haener became a key patron, amassing a significant collection of Vulokh’s works and supporting his career.

In 2001, Vulokh received a grant from the Soros Foundation to produce a catalog for his exhibition at Moscow's Fine Art Gallery. Five years later, Haener spearheaded the publication of Igor Vulokh: Paintings and Drawings, the first comprehensive multilingual monograph on the artist.

=== International exhibitions ===
The monograph's release coincided with a solo exhibition at Zurich’s Nadja Brykina Gallery in 2006. Curated by Troels Andersen, the show grouped works thematically, accompanied by Andersen’s critical analyses. The exhibition garnered acclaim from European critics, cementing Vulokh's reputation abroad.

== Later life and posthumous legacy ==
=== Final years and death ===
Vulokh remained artistically active until his death, dying on 28 November 2012 during hospitalization.

=== Posthumous recognition ===
Following the transfer of a portion of George Kostakis's collection to the State Museum of Contemporary Art in Thessaloniki in 2006, a dedicated exhibition showcased fifteen of Vulokh's early works, accompanied by a catalog documenting this period of his career.

Today, Vulokh's works are regularly featured in major international auctions, including Sotheby's and MacDougall's, reflecting his enduring influence in the art market.

== Exhibitions ==
=== 1950s–1980s ===
- 1957:
  - Group exhibition (debut), Moscow, USSR.
  - Solo exhibition, Exhibition Hall of the Moscow Branch of the USSR Union of Artists, Moscow, USSR.
- 1981: Exhibition of Soviet Artists, New York, USA.
- 1982: Exhibition of Soviet Artists, Bonn, Germany.
- 1984: New International Art 1959–1984, Museum Jorn, Silkeborg, Denmark.
- 1987:
  - Inter Art 87 International Art Fair, Chicago, USA.
  - Inter Art 87 International Art Fair, Poznań, Poland.
- 1988:
  - Art 88 International Art Fair, Los Angeles, USA.
  - Art Sovetico 88, Helsinki and Susma Suopelto, Finland.

=== 1990s ===
- 1990: Art Myth 1 International Art Fair, Central House of Artists, Moscow, USSR.
- 1991:
  - Solo exhibition, Brauner and Popov Gallery, West Berlin, Germany (first international exhibition).
  - Artists to Malevich, State Tretyakov Gallery, Moscow, Russia.
  - Tokyo Art Expo, Tokyo, Japan.
  - Art Myth 91, Central Exhibition Hall, Moscow, Russia.
- 1992:
  - Diaspora, Central House of Artists, Moscow, Russia.
  - Solo exhibition, Cristo Gallery, Vigevano, Italy.
- 1993:
  - Group exhibition, Sels Gallery, Düsseldorf, Germany.
  - Postmodern, State Tretyakov Gallery, Moscow, Russia.
  - Residency fellowship, Wiepersdorf Castle (Brandenburg Ministry of Culture), Germany; group exhibition at Wiepersdorf Cultural Center.
- 1994–1995: Solo exhibition, Popov Gallery, Berlin, Germany.
- 1994: Created graphic illustrations for Swedish poet Tomas Tranströmer’s works; exhibited at Tranströmer Poetry Festival, Gotland, Sweden.
- 1997: Solo exhibition, Fine Art Gallery, Moscow, Russia.
- 1998: Five Graphic Series to the Poetry of Gennady Aigi and Tomas Tranströmer, Chuvash State Art Museum, Cheboksary, Russia (60th birthday retrospective).
- 1999: First solo exhibition in Russia, National Cultural Center, Kazan, Russia.

=== 2000s ===
- 2001:
  - Solo exhibition, Art Manege, Moscow, Russia.
  - Gestures of Fire (with Gennady Aigi and Swedish Embassy), Fine Art Gallery, Moscow, Russia (honoring Tomas Tranströmer’s 70th anniversary).
  - Abstraction in Russia: 20th Century, State Russian Museum, Saint Petersburg, Russia (2001–2002).
- 2003:
  - Direction: West. Time Machine, New Manege and Kino Gallery, Moscow, Russia.
  - Black & White Cinema, New Manege and Kino Gallery, Moscow, Russia.
- 2004: Direction: North, Direction: South, New Manege and Kino Gallery, Moscow, Russia.
- 2005: Art Manege 2005, Kino Gallery, Moscow, Russia.
- 2006:
  - Retrospective of early works, State Museum of Conceptual Art, Thessaloniki, Greece.
  - Solo exhibition, Nadja Brykina Gallery, Zurich, Switzerland.
- 2007:
  - Nonconformists on Red Square, State Historical Museum and Connoisseur Gallery, Moscow, Russia.
  - Group exhibition, George Kostakis Collection, State Museum of Contemporary Art, Thessaloniki, Greece.
  - Fifty-Fifty: Paintings and Drawings (Alshibaya-Kurtser Collection), Pushkin State Museum of Fine Arts, Moscow, Russia.
- 2008:
  - Translation of Time (Satarov-Altman Collection), RuArts Gallery, Moscow, Russia.
  - 70th anniversary retrospective, ART4.RU Contemporary Art Museum, Moscow, Russia.
- 2009: Traditions of Nonconformism (Joseph Badalov Collection), Moscow Museum of Modern Art (MMOMA), Moscow, Russia.

=== 2010s ===
- 2011:
  - To Export from the USSR (Semenikhin Collection), Ekaterina Cultural Foundation, Moscow, Russia.
  - Informal Meeting (Nadja Brykina Collection), State Russian Museum, Saint Petersburg, Russia; repeated at Nadja Brykina Gallery, Moscow, Russia.
- 2012:
  - Group exhibition (Alshibaya-Falkovich Collection), ART4.RU Museum, Moscow, Russia.
  - Solo exhibition Return, Fine Art Gallery, Moscow, Russia.
  - Gray, Brusov Art Communication Gallery, Moscow, Russia.
  - Porcelain Sixties, Romanov Gallery, Moscow, Russia.

== Museum collections ==
- State Tretyakov Gallery (Moscow, Russia)
- State Russian Museum (Saint Petersburg, Russia)
- Museum Jorn (Silkeborg, Denmark)
- State Museum of Contemporary Art (Thessaloniki, Greece)
- Chuvash State Art Museum (Cheboksary, Russia)
- ART4.RU Contemporary Art Museum (Moscow, Russia)
- Museum RSUH "Other Art" (Eugene Nutovich Collection; Moscow, Russia)

== Private collections ==
- Greece: Athens (George Kostakis)
- United States: New York (F. Klauke)
- Denmark: Copenhagen (J. Borg)
- France: Paris (L. Rabel, A. Vitez, M. Fonfred)
- Spain: Barcelona (C. Puig, Dominique Serra)
- Italy: Rome (T. Guerro)
- Russia: Moscow (E. Altman, A. Kushner, M. Alshibay, M. Satarov, E. and V. Semenikhin, I. Markin, I. Badalov)
- Switzerland: Zurich (Urs R. Haener)

== Auctions ==
- 1990: Contemporary Soviet Art, Habsburg-Feldman Auction House, New York, USA.
- 2006:
  - MacDougall's, London, UK.
  - Sotheby's, London, UK.
- 2007:
  - Bruun Rasmussen, Copenhagen, Denmark.
  - MacDougall's, London, UK.
  - Sotheby's, London, UK.
- 2008:
  - Phillips de Pury & Company, London, UK.
  - MacDougall's, London, UK.
  - Sotheby's, London, UK.
- 2012: Gene Shapiro Auctions, New York, USA.
