= 2023 Davis Cup Europe Zone Group IV =

Davis Cup competition in 2023

The Europe Zone was the unique zone within Group 4 of the regional Davis Cup competition in 2023. The zone's competition was held in round robin format in Ulcinj, Montenegro from 26 to 29 July 2023.

== Participating nations ==
- Albania
- Andorra
- Armenia
- Azerbaijan
- Iceland
- Kosovo
- Liechtenstein

== Draw ==
Date: 26–29 July 2023

Location: Tennis Club Bellevue, Ulcinj, Montenegro (Clay)

Format: Round-robin basis. One pool of three teams and one pool of four teams and nations will play each team once in their pool. Nations finishing in the top two of each pool will enter promotional play-offs, with the first of Pool A facing the second of Pool B and the first of Pool B facing the second of Pool A, and the two winners will be promoted to Europe Zone Group III in 2024.

=== Seeding ===
Pot	Nation	Rank^{1}	Seed
1	Armenia		
1	Iceland		
2	Andorra		
2	Azerbaijan		
3	Albania		
3	Liechtenstein		
3	Kosovo		

- ^{1}Davis Cup Rankings as of

=== Round Robin ===
==== Pool A ====
	ARM	AND	LIE	RR; W–L	Set; W–L	Game; W–L	Standings
Armenia		2–1	3–0	2–0	5–1 (%)	– (%)	1
Andorra	1–2		2–1	1–1	3–3 (%)	– (%)	2
Liechtenstein	0–3	1–2		0–2	1–5 (%)	– (%)	3

==== Pool B ====
	KOS	AZE	ISL	ALB	RR; W–L	Set; W–L	Game; W–L	Standings
Kosovo		2–1	2–1	3–0	3–0	7–2 (%)	– (%)	1
Azerbaijan	1–2		3–0	3–0	2–1	7–2 (%)	– (%)	2
Iceland	1–2	0–3		3–0	1–2	4–5 (%)	– (%)	3
Albania	0–3	0–3	0–3		0–3	0–9 (%)	– (%)	4

Standings are determined by: 1. number of wins; 2. number of matches; 3. in two-team ties, head-to-head records; 4. in three-team ties, (a) percentage of sets won (head-to-head records if two teams remain tied), then (b) percentage of games won (head-to-head records if two teams remain tied), then (c) Davis Cup rankings.

=== Playoffs ===
Placing	A Team	Score	B Team
Promotional	Kosovo	2–0	Andorra
Promotional	Armenia	0–2	Azerbaijan
Fifth	Liechtenstein	0–2	Iceland

- Azerbaijan and Kosovo were promoted to 2024 Davis Cup Europe Zone Group III.

== Round Robin ==
=== Pool A ===
==== Armenia vs. Liechtenstein ====
Armenia
3
Tennis Club Bellevue, Ulcinj, Montenegro
26 July 2023
Clay

Liechtenstein
0

			1	2	3
1	(Armenia) (Liechtenstein)	Mikayel Avetisyan; Gian-Carlo Besimo	7; 5	7^{7} 6^{3}
2	(Armenia) (Liechtenstein)	Harutyun Sofyan; Andrej Spasojevic	6; 1			retired
3	(Armenia) (Liechtenstein)	Ashot Mkrtchyan / Henrik Nikoghosyan; Leo Hanke / Eric Peppard	6; 3	1; 0		retired

==== Andorra vs. Liechtenstein ====
Andorra
2
Tennis Club Bellevue, Ulcinj, Montenegro
27 July 2023
Clay

Liechtenstein
1

			1	2	3
1	(Andorra) (Liechtenstein)	Damien Gelabert; Andrej Spasojevic	6; 1	6; 0
2	(Andorra) (Liechtenstein)	Èric Cervós Noguer; Gian-Carlo Besimo	6^{2} 7^{7}	6; 4	5; 7
3	(Andorra) (Liechtenstein)	Èric Cervós Noguer / Damien Gelabert; Eric Peppard / Andrej Spasojevic	6; 2	6; 1

==== Armenia vs. Andorra ====
Armenia
2
Tennis Club Bellevue, Ulcinj, Montenegro
28 July 2023
Clay

Andorra
1

			1	2	3
1	(Armenia) (Andorra)	Harutyun Sofyan; Damien Gelabert	6; 2	6; 1
2	(Armenia) (Andorra)	Mikayel Avetisyan; Èric Cervós Noguer	6; 2	6^{2} 7^{7}	0; 4	retired
3	(Armenia) (Andorra)	Henrik Nikoghosyan / Harutyun Sofyan; Pablo Carrascosa / Daniel Carrillo Benítez	6; 2	6; 2

=== Pool B ===
==== Iceland vs. Albania ====
Iceland
3
Tennis Club Bellevue, Ulcinj, Montenegro
26 July 2023
Clay

Albania
0

			1	2	3
1	(Iceland) (Albania)	Rafn Bonifacius; Mario Zili	6; 1	7; 5
2	(Iceland) (Albania)	Egill Sigurðsson; Martin Muedini	6; 2	6; 2
3	(Iceland) (Albania)	Rafn Bonifacius / Egill Sigurðsson; Nermin Hoxhic / Mario Zili	6; 2	6; 2

==== Azerbaijan vs. Kosovo ====
Azerbaijan
1
Tennis Club Bellevue, Ulcinj, Montenegro
26 July 2023
Clay

Kosovo
2

			1	2	3
1	(Azerbaijan) (Kosovo)	Kanan Gasimov; Vullnet Tashi	2; 6	6; 3	3; 6
2	(Azerbaijan) (Kosovo)	Safar Rasulov; Jasin Jakupi	6; 4	7; 5
3	(Azerbaijan) (Kosovo)	Kanan Gasimov / Safar Rasulov; Mal Agushi / Vullnet Tashi	5; 7	3; 6

==== Iceland vs. Kosovo ====
Iceland
1
Tennis Club Bellevue, Ulcinj, Montenegro
27 July 2023
Clay

Kosovo
2

			1	2	3
1	(Iceland) (Kosovo)	Egill Sigurðsson; Jasin Jakupi	6; 1	4; 6	4; 6
2	(Iceland) (Kosovo)	Rafn Bonifacius; Vullnet Tashi	5; 7	0; 6
3	(Iceland) (Kosovo)	Rafn Bonifacius / Egill Sigurðsson; Mal Agushi / Granit Bajraliu	6; 1	6; 3

==== Azerbaijan vs. Albania ====
Azerbaijan
3
Tennis Club Bellevue, Ulcinj, Montenegro
27 July 2023
Clay

Albania
0

			1	2	3
1	(Azerbaijan) (Albania)	Safar Rasulov; Martin Muedini	6; 1	6; 0
2	(Azerbaijan) (Albania)	Kanan Gasimov; Arber Sulstarova	6; 0	6; 1
3	(Azerbaijan) (Albania)	Kanan Gasimov / Safar Rasulov; Martin Muedini / Mario Zili	6; 1	6; 1

==== Iceland vs. Azerbaijan ====
Iceland
0
Tennis Club Bellevue, Ulcinj, Montenegro
28 July 2023
Clay

Azerbaijan
3

			1	2	3
1	(Iceland) (Azerbaijan)	Egill Sigurðsson; Safar Rasulov	5; 7	1; 6
2	(Iceland) (Azerbaijan)	Rafn Bonifacius; Kanan Gasimov	5; 7	3; 6
3	(Iceland) (Azerbaijan)	Andri Jonsson / Egill Sigurðsson; Kanan Gasimov / Safar Rasulov	2; 6	2; 6

==== Albania vs. Kosovo ====
Albania
0
Tennis Club Bellevue, Ulcinj, Montenegro
28 July 2023
Clay

Kosovo
3

			1	2	3
1	(Albania) (Kosovo)	Martin Muedini; Jasin Jakupi	0; 6	0; 6
2	(Albania) (Kosovo)	Mario Zili; Mal Agushi	2; 6	2; 6
3	(Albania) (Kosovo)	Martin Muedini / Mario Zili; Granit Bajraliu / Fresk Sylhasi	1; 6	7^{7} 6^{5}	1; 6

== Play-offs ==
=== Promotional play-offs ===
==== Kosovo vs. Andorra ====
Kosovo
2
Tennis Club Bellevue, Ulcinj, Montenegro
29 July 2023
Clay

Andorra
0

			1	2	3
1	(Kosovo) (Andorra)	Jasin Jakupi; Damien Gelabert	6; 3	6; 0
2	(Kosovo) (Andorra)	Vullnet Tashi; Èric Cervós Noguer	6; 3	6; 0
3	(Kosovo) (Andorra)	Mal Agushi / Fresk Sylhasi; Èric Cervós Noguer / Damien Gelabert				not played

==== Armenia vs. Azerbaijan ====
Armenia
0
Tennis Club Bellevue, Ulcinj, Montenegro
29 July 2023
Clay

Azerbaijan
2

			1	2	3
1	(Armenia) (Azerbaijan)	Harutyun Sofyan; Safar Rasulov	4; 6	2; 6
2	(Armenia) (Azerbaijan)	Mikayel Avetisyan; Kanan Gasimov	3; 6	2; 6
3	(Armenia) (Azerbaijan)	Ashot Mkrtchyan / Henrik Nikoghosyan; Kanan Gasimov / Safar Rasulov				not played

=== Fifth place play-off ===
==== Liechtenstein vs. Iceland ====
Liechtenstein
0
Tennis Club Bellevue, Ulcinj, Montenegro
29 July 2023
Clay

Iceland
2

			1	2	3
1	(Liechtenstein) (Iceland)	Eric Peppard; Egill Sigurðsson	1; 6	2; 6
2	(Liechtenstein) (Iceland)	Andrej Spasojevic; Rafn Bonifacius	0; 6	2; 6
3	(Liechtenstein) (Iceland)	Eric Peppard / Andrej Spasojevic; Rafn Bonifacius / Egill Sigurðsson				not played

== Final placements ==
Placing	Teams	
Promoted/First	Azerbaijan	Kosovo
Third	Andorra	Armenia
Fifth	Iceland	
Sixth	Liechtenstein	
Seventh	Albania	

- Azerbaijan and Kosovo were promoted to 2024 Davis Cup Europe Zone Group III.
