= Egor Altman =

Russian-Israeli businessman, gallerist and collector

- Егор Альтман
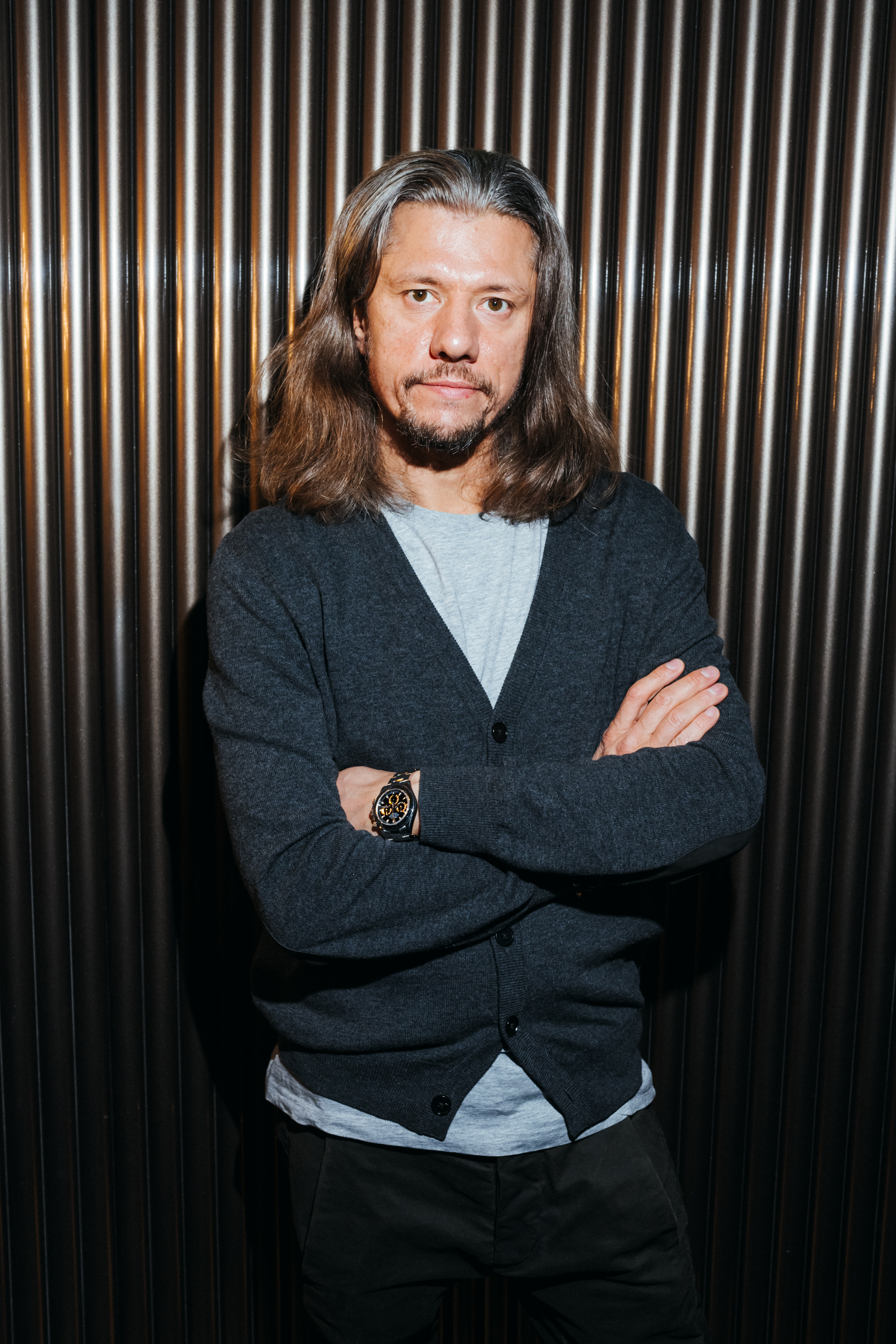
- Altman in 2020
- Born: 22 April 1975 (age 51); Moscow, Soviet Union
- Citizenship: Russian, Israeli
- Education: International Institute of Advertising, Stockholm School of Economics, University of the Arts London, Sotheby's Institute of Art, Open Medical and Psychological University
- Occupations: Businessman, gallerist, collector
- Children: 3
- Website: altmans.gallery

Egor (Georgy) Ilyich Altman (Russian: Георгий Ильич Альтман, Hebrew: גיורא אלטמן, translit. Giora Altman; born 22 April 1975) is a Russian-Israeli entrepreneur, media executive, art collector, and gallerist.

He was born and raised in Moscow. His father, originally a research scholar, later went into business. His mother worked as a theatrical designer; his stepfather, Igor Vulokh, was an artist.

Altman held a number of executive positions in the media industry and was the owner and co-owner of several companies in this field. In 2015, he founded the art gallery Altmans Gallery and gradually focused his professional efforts on its development.

Alongside his business career, he has been involved in public service and philanthropy. He has received several awards for his professional and civic contributions.

== Biography ==
Altman was born in Moscow. His mother, Natalia Olegovna Tukolkina-Okhota, formerly worked as a theatrical designer, and his father, Ilya Alexandrovich Altman, originally a research scholar, later became a businessman after the collapse of the Soviet Union. His paternal grandfather, Alexander Altman, was a scholar and an expert in satellite communication systems.

Shortly after Altman's birth, his parents divorced. At the age of one and a half, he moved in with his great-grandmother, with whom he lived until the age of six, returning to his mother shortly before starting school.

Soon after that, Altman's mother remarried. His stepfather was the abstract painter Igor Vulokh (1938–2012), who had a strong influence on Altman. From that marriage, Altman gained a sister, the film scholar Lidia Vulokh.

Attending school less and less frequently, Altman began engaging in commercial activity from an early age. He later earned a degree in education with a specialization in history, and also graduated from the International Institute of Advertising and the Stockholm School of Economics with a specialization in strategic business management and marketing.

== Business career ==
=== Media business and advertising ===
At the age of 17, Altman was invited by relatives who had launched one of the first cable television channels in Moscow — Lefortovo TV — to serve as its commercial director. He later co-founded, together with his father, NAST, one of the first companies in Russia specializing in the production and placement of outdoor advertising.

In 1996, marking his first fully independent venture, Altman founded and headed the advertising agency HIDALGO (also known as Hidalgo Image). He was later joined by Dmitry Solopov as a co-owner. The agency was ranked among the top 30 media agencies in Russia. The agency was known for its work with major pharmaceutical companies, including winning tenders from Pfizer for advertising campaigns in Russia. Altman has described this business as the key milestone in his professional career.

Altman also held executive positions in advertising and external communications at the Stolichnaya Vechernyaya Gazeta, the publishing house Moskovskiye Novosti, Master Bank, Investbank, and the Antiviral pharmaceutical company. He also served as First Deputy General Director and was one of the shareholders of the media holding company United Media.

As part of the United Media holding, in 2007 Altman was among the co-founders of Business FM, Russia's first business-focused radio station, which achieved significant success. The brand name was proposed by the HIDALGO agency. In 2009, amid the Great Recession, the main shareholder of United Media, Arcadi Gaydamak, sold the holding to Vladimir Lisin, and Altman soon left the company.

Since 2015, Altman headed a new advertising agency he founded, AltCommunicationGroup. In 2016, the company received the RuPoR public relations award in the Corporate Communications category. In 2017, it was awarded the Silver Archer national public relations prize. That same year, the agency ranked 11th nationwide by media spend. In 2021, part of the business was sold by Altman to the communications group Twiga.

=== Gallery business ===
In November 2015, Altman and his wife founded Altmans Gallery in Moscow. The gallery specializes in prints by renowned 20th-century artists, including Marc Chagall, Salvador Dalí, Pablo Picasso, Henri Matisse, Andy Warhol, and Yuri Norstein. It has carried out a number of major exhibition projects, such as an exhibition of works by Dalí titled Alice in Wonderland. It featured pieces from the Maison d’Art Gallery in Monaco, including drawings from Dalí’s Alice in Wonderland series, created as illustrations for Lewis Carroll’s classic novel, as well as works from the "Tarot Cards" series originally produced for the 1973 James Bond film Live and Let Die.

From 2017 to 2020, the gallery also operated a branch in Tel Aviv, presenting exhibitions of modern and contemporary art to Israeli audiences. The gallery hosted themed exhibitions, including Chagall, Dali, Picasso and Norstein. Alongside paintings of contemporary artists, it also exhibited works by contemporary Russian artists in ceramic, porcelain, and sculpture formats. Altmans Gallery has also hosted events, including a solo show by illusionist Uri Geller, organized in collaboration with the artist himself. Some of the gallery’s events were attended by prominent public figures, including political personalities such as Sara Netanyahu and Avi Gabbay.

Since 2020, Altman has focused on developing his art business.

== Public activities ==
=== Art and educational projects ===
Altman produced an exhibition dedicated to the 70th anniversary of his stepfather Igor Vulokh at the ART4 Contemporary Art Museum (2008), where poems by Gennady Aygi were played as a sound backdrop. Altman also organized an exhibition of Vulokh's works at the Moscow Museum of Modern Art (2013).

After the artist's death, Altman founded and headed the Igor Vulokh Creative Heritage Foundation in 2013. In 2015, the Yekaterina Cultural Foundation hosted a solo exhibition titled "Repatriation", featuring 43 works by Vulokh that had been discovered in Europe by his widow Natalia Tukolkina-Okhota and Egor Altman and brought back to Russia. In 2023, Altman organized the exhibition "Twin Fields" at the Ruarts Foundation space, dedicated to the 85th anniversary of Vulokh, which traced the artist’s personal and creative journey, as well as his connection with the poets Aygi and Tomas Tranströmer.

Altman curated the release of limited-edition art plates featuring designs by Igor Vulokh and Michail Grobman. These collectible items were produced as part of broader efforts to preserve and promote the legacy of Soviet nonconformist artists.

Altman has also lectured at Bar-Ilan University in Israel. Since 2022, he serves as a lecturer in the online course How to Become a Collector on the Synchronize platform (Russia), developed in collaboration with Sotheby’s and Art Basel. Altman also co-authored the book Fame, Money and Neurosis (2025) with psychotherapist Tsiala Krikheli. The publication explores psychological factors that shape the behavior and motivation of high-achieving individuals.

=== Media and industry involvement ===
Altman served as vice president of the Association of Communication Agencies of Russia (ACAR) and co-chair of the ACAR Commission on Small and Medium Business. He was one of the main speakers at the Kazakhstan Media Summit in 2018. In 2021, Altman was elected a member of the Russian Academy of Advertising. He curated the New Media section at the Russian Creative Week in 2020.

=== Charity and Jewish community engagement ===
Altman chairs the Public Council of the Russian Jewish Congress, and serves on the Academic Council of the Jewish Museum and Tolerance Center. In 2017, to mark the 130th anniversary of Jewish artist Marc Chagall, the Israeli Embassy in Russia hosted a reception at the Moscow branch of Altmans Gallery, in cooperation with the Russian Jewish Congress.

Altman has organized charity auctions of contemporary art, with proceeds donated to organizations supporting critically ill children. As part of its philanthropic activities, Altmans Gallery has donated portions of its proceeds to charitable organizations, including Encore Charity, the Tel Aviv Foundation and Save a Child’s Heart. The latter received all funds raised during a charity auction held in collaboration with Uri Geller in 2020.

== Awards and recognition ==
In 2007, Altman was ranked among the top five financial directors in the media business according to the Kommersant ranking. He received the diploma “A Year with Kommersant” for developing the idea of the “Kommersant of the Year” award. He won the national “Media Manager of Russia” award three times (in 2008, 2012, and 2016). In 2019, Altman was awarded the honorary badge “Tikkun Olam” for his contribution to Jewish philanthropy, including support for the installation of a monument to Samuil Marshak and the organization of a series of events dedicated to the Righteous Among the Nations. He received the "Gratitude from the Mayor of Moscow" award for his contributions to the city's cultural life.

== Personal life ==
Egor Altman was married twice: first to journalist Kira Altman, and later to Kristina Altman. In his second marriage, he had three children: Eva, Matvey, and Ida. Altman is also a collector, with interests in contemporary art and phaleristics.

Following in his stepfather's footsteps, he began collecting military insignia, decorations, photographs, and documents related to the White Army and White émigrés at the age of 27, eventually amassing a substantial collection.
