= Vasknarva =

Village in Estonia

- Village
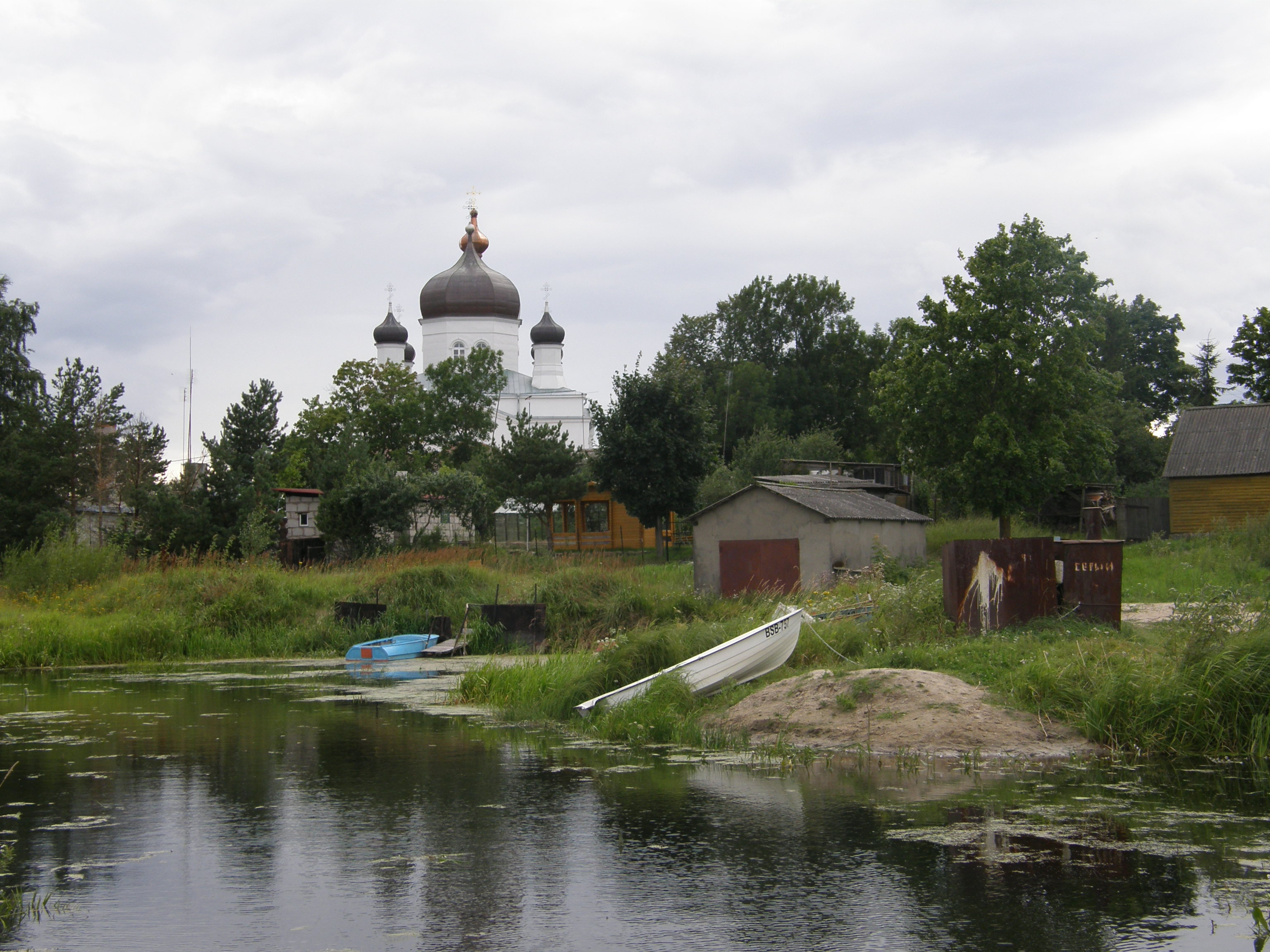

- Location in Estonia
- Coordinates: 58°59′58″N 27°44′19″E
- Country: Estonia
- County: Ida-Viru County
- Municipality: Alutaguse Parish

Population (2011)
  - Total: 40

Vasknarva (Russian: Сыренец, Syrenets; German: Neuschloss) is a village in Alutaguse Parish, Ida-Viru County in northeastern Estonia.

== Geography ==
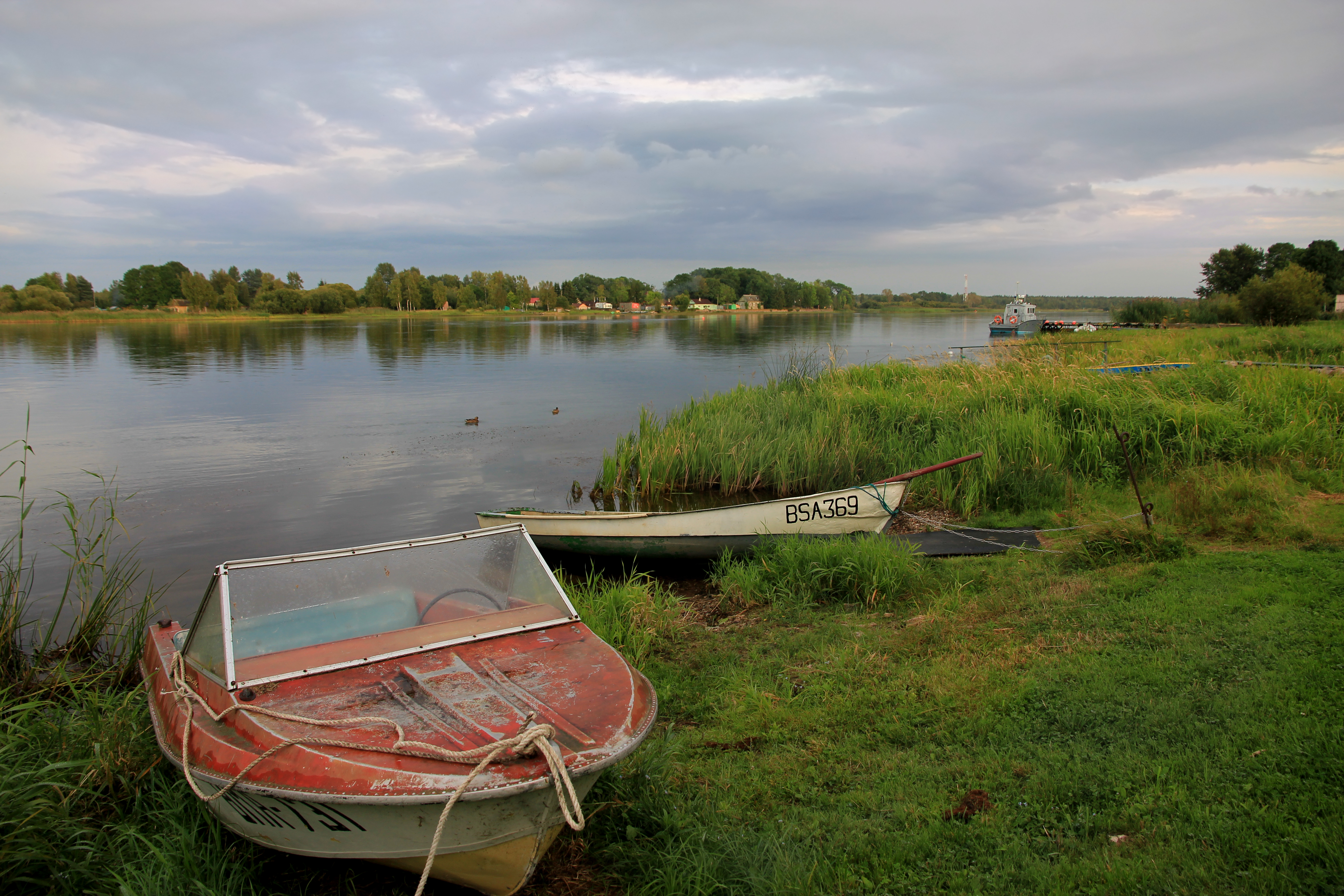
Small boat harbour at Vasknarva

The settlement is located on the northern shore of Lake Peipus, on the left bank of the Narva River headwaters forming the border with Russia. Vasknarva has a population of 40 (as of 2011), most of them are Orthodox Old Believers. Nearly the entire population is Russian-speaking.

There is a small boat harbour, a border guard cordon, a nunnery and the St. Elijah Orthodox church. By its architecture Vasknarva is a common Peipsi Russian linear village where one-storey wooden buildings are situated side by side just beside the street. The Peipus lakeshore and the extended forests in the surrounding area are a popular destination for daytrippers.

On the other bank of Narva River there is the Russian locality of Skamya, part of Slantsevsky District.

== History ==
The name is derived from Estonian: Vask, "Copper", and the Narva River. According to etymology, it referred to the copper roof of the medieval castle. According to the Estonian ethnologist, A. Moora, in her book Peipsimaa Etnlisest Ajaloost, (About the Ethnic History of Peipsiland, published in 1964 by the Institute of History of the Estonian SSR Academy of Sciences), the name is derived from the Votian word for "new" and denotes a new Narva fortress. Local lore has it that Saint Olga of Pskov (c. 890 – 969) narrowly escaped drowning when crossing the Narva rapids.

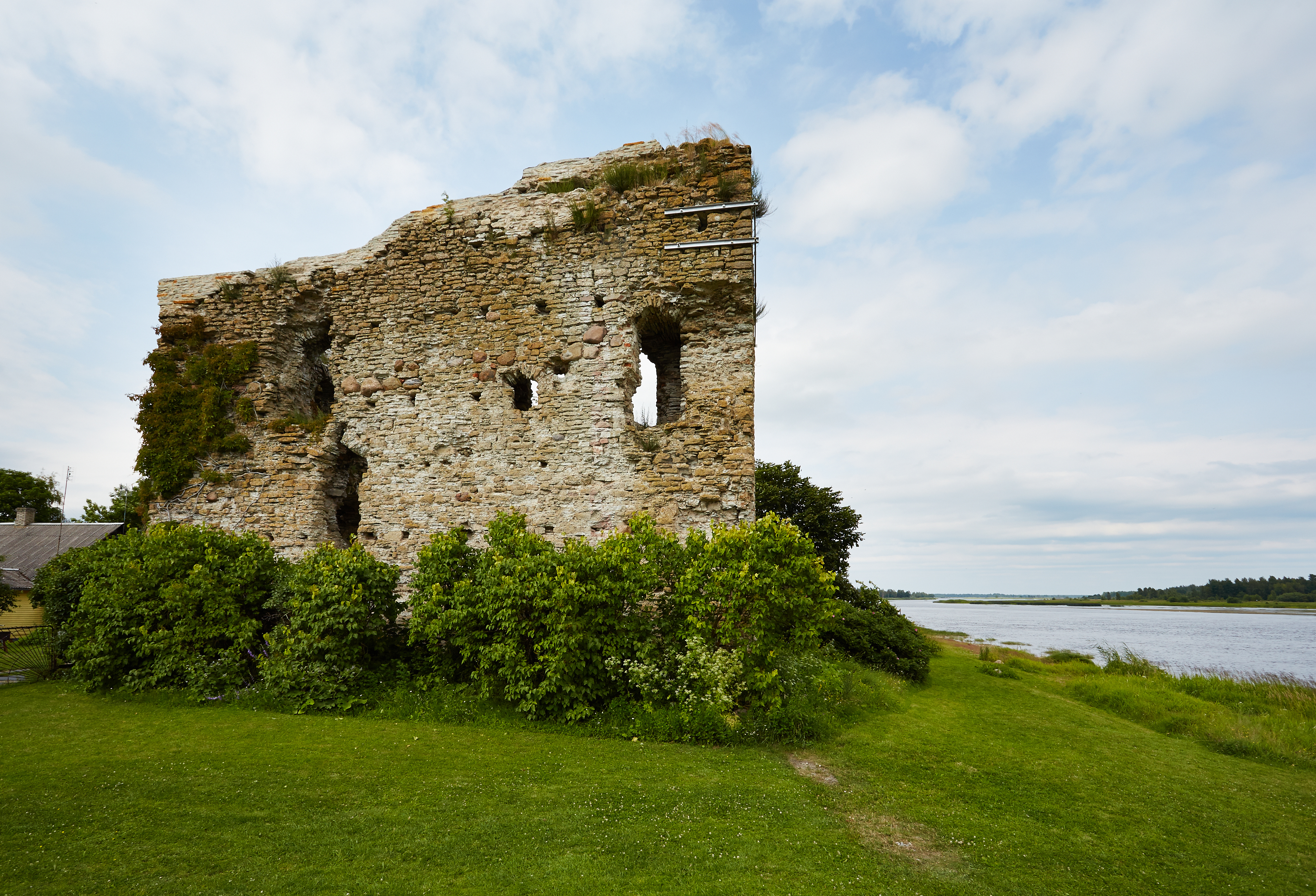
Castle ruins

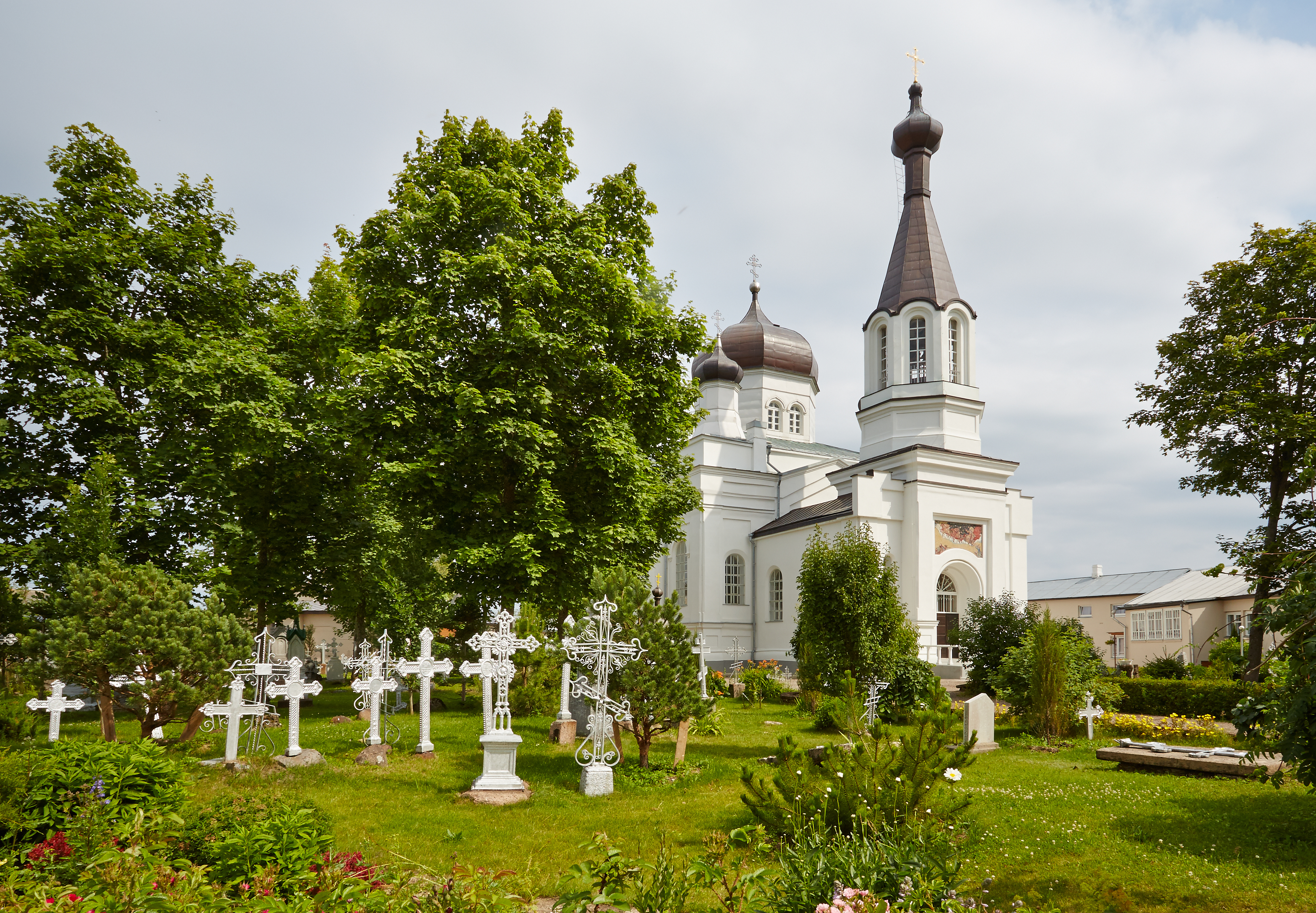
Vasknarva Orthodox church

The village arose in 14th century next to an Ordensburg of the Livonian Brothers, erected in 1349 on the northeastern border of their Terra Mariana territory. Demolished by Pskov troops, a new castle (Low German: Nyslott; Estonian: Vastne-Narva) was built at the site from 1427 to 1442, which became the administrative centre of a Livonian Vogtei (Vasknarva foogtkond).

The castle was again wracked during the Siege of Narva in 1558, when the Livonian Confederation perished in the Livonian War. Occupied by Pontus De la Gardie in 1581 and rebuilt under Swedish rule, it remained a fort of great importance, commanding the mouth of the Narva River and the border with the Tsardom of Russia. Finally, it was completely destroyed in the Russo-Swedish Ingrian War of 1610–17 and abandoned. Already decayed during the Great Northern War, the remnants were formally handed over to the Russians by the 1721 Treaty of Nystad.

The former castle's stones were used for reconstruction of the fishing village, which has been known in Russian chronicles either as Syrensk or Syrenets. A Russian Orthodox church building dedicated to the prophet Elijah was erected in 1818. Parts of the three-meter thick walls of the fortress have survived, mainly on the northern side.

== Notable people ==
Notable people that were born or lived in Vasknarva include the following:

- Temira Pachmuss (1927–2007), American philologist
- Jegor Solovjov (1871–1942), Estonian politician

== See also ==
- History of Estonia
- List of castles in Estonia
