= Rrezart Cungu =

Montenegrin tennis player (born 1998)

- Country (sports): Montenegro
- Residence: Bar, Montenegro
- Born: 18 July 1998 (age 28) Ulcinj, Montenegro
- Height: 1.73 m (5 ft 8 in)
- Plays: Right-handed
- Prize money: $32,931

Singles
- Career record: 0–0 (at ATP Tour level, Grand Slam level)
- Career titles: 0; 0 Challenger, 1 ITF World Tennis Tour
- Highest ranking: No. 578 (12 June 2023)

Doubles
- Career record: 0–0 (at ATP Tour level, Grand Slam level)
- Career titles: 0; 0 Challenger, 1 Futures
- Highest ranking: No. 883 (22 May 2023)

Team competitions
- Davis Cup: 18–14
- Last updated on: 21 July 2025.

Rrezart Cungu (born 18 July 1998) is a Montenegrin tennis player.

Cungu has a career high ATP singles ranking of 578 achieved on 12 June 2023. He also has a career high ATP doubles ranking of 883, achieved on 22 May 2023. Cungu has won 1 ITF doubles title.

Cungu has represented Montenegro at Davis Cup, his debut was one day before his 17th birthday against Estonia on 17 July 2017. In Davis Cup he has a win–loss record of 18–14. He also plays on the Wake Forest University tennis team, with whom he won the ACC Championship and NCAA Division I Men's Tennis Team Championship in 2018.

== Future and Challenger finals ==
=== Singles: 4 (2–2) ===
Legend
Challengers 0 (0–0)
Futures / World Tennis Tour 2 (2–2)

Outcome	No.	Date	Tournament	Surface	Opponent	Score
Runner-up	1.	June 10, 2017	Kiseljak, Bosnia and Herzegovina F3	Clay	(Austria) David Pichler	6–3, 3–6, 4–6
Winner	2.	September 26, 2021	M15 Ulcinj, Montenegro	Clay	(Italy) Samuel Vincent Ruggeri	6–3, 2–6, 6–1
Winner	3.	November 6, 2022	M15 Antalya, Turkey	Clay	(United States) Bruno Kuzuhara	4–6, 6–3, 6–1
Runner-up	4.	December 4, 2022	M15 Antalya, Turkey	Clay	(Romania) Filip Cristian Jianu	2–6, 4–6

=== Doubles 2 (1–1) ===
Legend
Challengers 0 (0–0)
Futures 1 (1–1)

Outcome	No.	Date	Tournament	Surface	Partner	Opponents	Score
Winner	1.	January 29, 2017	Hammamet, Tunisia F3	Clay	(Montenegro) Ljubomir Čelebić	(Spain) Oriol Roca Batalla (Netherlands) Mark Vervoort	6–4, 6–3
Runner-up	2.	May 28, 2022	M15 Ulcinj, Montenegro	Clay	(Cyprus) Petros Chrysochos	(Italy) Marcello Serafini (Italy) Samuel Vincent Ruggeri	3–6, 4–6

== Davis Cup ==
=== Participations: (18–14) ===
Group membership World Group (0–0) WG Play-off (0–0) Group I (0–0) Group II (0–0) Group III (15–14) Group IV (3–0)	Matches by surface Hard (4–6) Clay (14–8) Grass (0–0) Carpet (0–0)	Matches by type Singles (16–8) Doubles (2–6)

- ▲ ▼ indicates the outcome of the Davis Cup match followed by the score, date, place of event, the zonal classification and its phase, and the court surface.

Rubber outcome	No.	Rubber	Match type (partner if any)	Opponent nation	Opponent player(s)	Score
▼0–3; 17 July 2015; City of San Marino, San Marino; Europe Zone Group III Round Robin; Clay surface
Defeat	1	III	Doubles (with Ivan Saveljić)	Estonia	Kenneth Raisma / Mattias Siimar	1–6, 2–6
▲2–1; 2 March 2016; Tere Tennis Center, Tallinn, Estonia; Europe Zone Group III Round Robin; Hard (indoor) surface
Defeat	2	I	Singles	Andorra	Jean-Baptiste Poux-Gautier	3–6, 5–7
▲2–1; 3 March 2016; Tere Tennis Center, Tallinn, Estonia; Europe Zone Group III Round Robin; Hard (indoor) surface
Defeat	3	I	Singles	Iceland	Rafn Kumar Bonifacius	4–6, 4–6
▼0–3; 4 March 2016; Tere Tennis Center, Tallinn, Estonia; Europe Zone Group III Round Robin; Hard (indoor) surface
Defeat	4	III	Doubles (with Matija Bulatovic)	Cyprus	Constandinos Christoforou / Soteris Hadjistyllis	2–6, 3–6
▼0–2; 5 March 2016; Tere Tennis Center, Tallinn, Estonia; Europe Zone Group III 5th-8th Play off; Hard (indoor) surface
Defeat	5	II	Singles	(North Macedonia) Macedonia	Dimitar Grabul	2–6, 0–6
▲3–0; 6 April 2017; Holiday Village Santa Marina, Sozopol, Bulgaria; Europe Zone Group III Round Robin; Hard surface
Victory	6	I	Singles	Kosovo	Granit Bajraliu	6–1, 6–0
▲2–1; 7 April 2017; Holiday Village Santa Marina, Sozopol, Bulgaria; Europe Zone Group III Round Robin; Hard surface
Victory	7	I	Singles	Andorra	Jean-Baptiste Poux-Gautier	6–4, 6–2
▼1–2; 7-8 April 2017; Holiday Village Santa Marina, Sozopol, Bulgaria; Europe Zone Group III Round Robin; Hard surface
Defeat	8	I	Singles	(Republic of Ireland) Ireland	Sam Barry	0–6, 1–6
Defeat	9	III	Doubles (with Ljubomir Čelebić)	(Republic of Ireland) Ireland	Sam Barry / David O'Hare	2–6, 4–6
▲2–1; 8 April 2017; Holiday Village Santa Marina, Sozopol, Bulgaria; Europe Zone Group III 5th-8th Play off; Hard surface
Victory	10	II	Singles	Greece	Ioannis Stergiou	7–5, 6–0
Victory	11	III	Doubles (with Ljubomir Čelebić)	Greece	Charalampos Kapogiannis / Petros Tsitsipas	7–5, 6–2
▲3–0; 4 April 2018; Ulcinj Bellevue, Ulcinj, Montenegro; Europe Zone Group III Round Robin; Clay surface
Victory	12	I	Singles	Armenia	Torgom Asatryan	6–3, 6–0
Victory	13	III	Doubles (with Ljubomir Čelebić)	Armenia	Sedrak Khachatryan / Henrik Nikoghosyan	6–1, 6–1
▲2–1; 5 April 2018; Ulcinj Bellevue, Ulcinj, Montenegro; Europe Zone Group III Round Robin; Clay surface
Victory	14	I	Singles	Latvia	Artūrs Lazdiņš	6–3, 6–1
▲2–1; 6 April 2018; Ulcinj Bellevue, Ulcinj, Montenegro; Europe Zone Group III Round Robin; Clay surface
Victory	15	I	Singles	Greece	Ioannis Stergiou	7–6^{(7–2)}, 6–2
▲3–0; 7 April 2018; Ulcinj Bellevue, Ulcinj, Montenegro; Europe Zone Group III Promotional Play off; Clay surface
Victory	16	I	Singles	Malta	Denzil Agius	6–0, 6–0
▼0–3; 11 September 2019; Tatoi Club, Athens, Greece; Europe Zone Group III Pool B Round Robin; Clay surface
Defeat	17	I	Singles	Latvia	Robert Strombachs	2–6, 4–6
Defeat	18	III	Doubles (with Igor Saveljić)	Latvia	Artūrs Lazdiņš / Jānis Podžus	3–6, 4–6
▼0–3; 12 September 2019; Tatoi Club, Athens, Greece; Europe Zone Group III Pool B Round Robin; Clay surface
Defeat	19	I	Singles	Estonia	Vladimir Ivanov	1–6, 3–6
▲3–0; 13 September 2019; Tatoi Club, Athens, Greece; Europe Zone Group III Pool B Round Robin; Clay surface
Victory	20	I	Singles	North Macedonia	Dimitar Grabul	6–3, 6–2
▼1–2; 14 September 2019; Tatoi Club, Athens, Greece; Europe Zone Group III 7th-8th playoff; Clay surface
Defeat	21	I	Singles	Luxembourg	Chris Rodesch	4–6, 7–5, 1–6
▲3–0; 22 June 2021; Tennis Club Jug-Skopje, Skopje, North Macedonia; Europe Zone Group IV Round robin; Clay surface
Victory	22	II	Singles	Albania	Daniel Ostap	6–1, 6–2
▲3–0; 24 June 2021; Tennis Club Jug-Skopje, Skopje, North Macedonia; Europe Zone Group IV Round robin; Clay surface
Victory	23	II	Singles	Azerbaijan	Tamerlan Azizov	6–1, 6–1
▲3–0; 26 June 2021; Tennis Club Jug-Skopje, Skopje, North Macedonia; Europe Zone Group IV Round robin; Clay surface
Victory	24	II	Singles	Armenia	Mikayel Avetisyan	6–1, 6–0
▼1–2; 22 June 2022; Ulcinj Bellevue, Ulcinj, Montenegro; Europe Zone Group III Round Robin Pool B; Clay surface
Victory	25	II	Singles	Moldova	Alexander Cozbinov	4–6, 6–4, 6–2
Defeat	26	III	Doubles (with Petar Jovanović)	Moldova	Alexander Cozbinov / Ilya Snițari	6–3, 3–6, 2–6
▼1–2; 23 June 2022; Ulcinj Bellevue, Ulcinj, Montenegro; Europe Zone Group III Round Robin Pool B; Clay surface
Victory	27	II	Singles	North Macedonia	Berk Bugarikj	6–4, 6–0
Defeat	28	III	Doubles (with Petar Jovanović)	North Macedonia	Kalin Ivanovski / Gorazd Srbljak	5–7, 3–6
▼1–2; 24 June 2022; Ulcinj Bellevue, Ulcinj, Montenegro; Europe Zone Group III Round Robin Pool B; Clay surface
Victory	29	II	Singles	Luxembourg	Alex Knaff	6–4, 3–6, 6–3
▲3–0; 25 June 2022; Ulcinj Bellevue, Ulcinj, Montenegro; Europe Zone Group III Relegation play-off; Clay surface
Victory	30	II	Singles	Armenia	Mikayel Avetisyan	5–2 ret.
▲3–0; 19 June 2024; Ulcinj Bellevue, Ulcinj, Montenegro; Europe Zone Group III Round Robin Pool A; Clay surface
Victory	31	II	Singles	North Macedonia	Shendrit Deari	6–1, 6–3
▼1–2; 21 June 2024; Ulcinj Bellevue, Ulcinj, Montenegro; Europe Zone Group III Round Robin Pool A; Clay surface
Defeat	32	II	Singles	Slovenia	Bor Artnak	2–6, 3–6

== Games of the Small States of Europe ==
=== Mixed Doubles 1 (1 runner-up) ===
Outcome	No.	Date	Tournament	Surface	Partner	Opponent	Score
Runner-up	1.	1 June 2019	Budva, Montenegro	Clay	(Montenegro) Vladica Babić	(Cyprus) Raluca Șerban (Cyprus) Eleftherios Neos	4–6, 6–3, [7–10]

== See also ==
- List of Montenegro Davis Cup team representatives
