= List of Montenegro Davis Cup team representatives =

This is a list of tennis players who have represented the Montenegro Davis Cup team in an official Davis Cup match. Montenegro has taken part in the competition since 2007.

== Players ==
This table is current through the end of the 2019 Davis Cup Euro/Africa Zone Group III matches (September 14, 2019).

Player	W-L (Total)	W-L (Singles)	W-L (Doubles)	Ties	Debut	Years Played
Mario Aleksić	2–2	0–0	2–2	4	2017	2
Marko Begović	5–1	2–0	3–1	6	2007	2
Matija Bulatovic	0–2	0–1	0–1	2	2016	1
Ljubomir Čelebić	33–12	21–9	12–3	33	2010	10
Rrezart Cungu	10–11	8–7	2–4	17	2015	5
Daniel Danilović	15–9	9–5	6–4	16	2007	4
Stefan Dragović	1–2	0–0	1–2	3	2018	1
Nemanja Kontić	10–3	2–1	8–2	12	2007	4
Pavle Rogan	8–8	2–4	6–4	17	2012	6
Igor Saveljić	9–10	5–4	4–6	15	2012	5
Ivan Saveljić	3–5	0–1	3–4	9	2012	4
Goran Tošić	17–10	12–7	5–3	17	2007	5
