= Mārtiņš Rocēns =

Latvian tennis player (born 2000)

- Country (sports): Latvia
- Born: 9 April 2000 (age 26) Riga, Latvia
- Height: 1.85 m (6 ft 1 in)
- Plays: Right-handed (two-handed backhand)
- College: NC State
- Prize money: $5,398

Singles
- Career record: 1–0 (at ATP Tour level, Grand Slam level, and in Davis Cup)
- Career titles: 0
- Highest ranking: No. 1,318 (12 August 2024)
- Current ranking: No. 1,444 (2 March 2025)

Doubles
- Career record: 1–1 (at ATP Tour level, Grand Slam level, and in Davis Cup)
- Career titles: 0
- Highest ranking: No. 1,117 (12 August 2024)
- Current ranking: No. 1,548 (2 March 2025)
- Last updated on: 29 August 2022.

Mārtiņš Rocēns (born 9 April 2000) is a Latvian tennis player.

Rocēns has a career high ATP singles ranking of 1482 achieved on 8 August 2022. He also has a career high ATP doubles ranking of 1367 achieved on 15 August 2022.

Rocēns represents Latvia at the Davis Cup, where he has a W/L record of 2–1. He also plays college tennis at NC State University.
