= Yegor Kholodilov =

Russian association football player

Personal information
- Full name: Yegor Sergeyevich Kholodilov
- Date of birth: 6 May 1999 (age 27)
- Place of birth: Vladivostok, Russia
- Height: 1.76 m (5 ft 9 in)
- Position: Forward

Senior career*
Years	Team	Apps	(Gls)
2016–2017	FC Luch-Energiya-M Vladivostok		
2017–2018	FC Luch-Energiya Vladivostok	1	(0)
2018–2019	FC Sakhalin Yuzhno-Sakhalinsk	9	(2)
2020	FC Dynamo Barnaul	1	(0)
- * Club domestic league appearances and goals

Yegor Sergeyevich Kholodilov (Russian: Егор Сергеевич Холодилов; born 6 May 1999) is a Russian former football player.

== Club career ==
He made his debut in the Russian Football National League for FC Luch-Energiya Vladivostok on 12 November 2017 in a game against FC Shinnik Yaroslavl.
