= Yegor Petrov =

Yegor Petrov Russian: Егор Петров
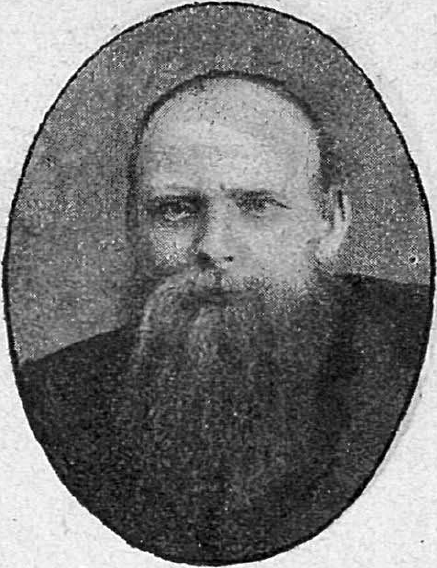
- 1907

Deputy of the Second Imperial Duma
- In office 20 February 1907 – 3 June 1907
- Monarch: Nicholas II

Personal details
- Born: Yegor Alekseevich Petrov; 1862 Yekaterinburg, Yekaterinburgsky Uyezd, Perm Governorate, Russian Empire
- Died: 1918 (aged 55–56) Irkutsk, RSFSR
- Party: Bolsheviks

Yegor Alekseevich Petrov (incorrectly Aleksandrovich, Russian: Егóр Алексéевич Петрóв; 1862/1871, Yekaterinburg — 1918/1919, Irkutsk) was a Russian worker and deputy of the Second Imperial Duma from the Perm Governorate in 1907.

== Literature ==
- Петров Егор Алексеевич (in Russian) // Государственная дума Российской империи: 1906—1917 / Б. Ю. Иванов, А. А. Комзолова, И. С. Ряховская. — М.: РОССПЭН, 2008. — P. 456. — 735 p. — ISBN 978-5-8243-1031-3.
- Члены Государственной Думы (портреты и биографии). Второй созыв. 1907—1912 гг. / Сост. М. М. Боиович. — М., 1907. — P. 241. (in Russian)
