= 2024 Davis Cup Europe Zone Group III =

Davis Cup competition in 2024

The Europe Zone was the unique zone within Group 3 of the regional Davis Cup competition in 2024. The zone's competition was held in round robin format in Ulcinj, Montenegro, from 19 to 22 June 2024.

== Participating nations ==
- Azerbaijan
- Cyprus
- Kosovo
- Moldova
- Montenegro
- North Macedonia
- Slovenia

== Draw ==
Date: 19–22 June 2024

Location: Tennis Club Bellevue, Ulcinj, Montenegro (Clay)

Format: Round-robin basis. One pool of three teams and One pool of four teams and nations will play each team once in their group. The nations finishing in first place in each pool will automatically be promoted to the World Group II Play-offs in 2025. They will be joined by the winner of the promotion play-off between the two teams finishing in second in each group.

The team finishing in fourth place in Pool B will be relegated to Europe Group IV in 2025 along with the loser of the relegation play-off between the two nations finishing in third place in each pool.

=== Seeding ===
Pot	Nation	Rank^{1}	Seed
1	Slovenia	64	1
1	Cyprus	73	2
2	Moldova	81	3
2	North Macedonia	87	4
3	Montenegro	93	5
3	Azerbaijan	94	6
4	Kosovo	96	7

- ^{1}Davis Cup Rankings as of 18 March 2024

=== Round Robin ===
==== Pool A ====
		MNE	SLO	MKD	RR; W–L	Set; W–L	Game; W–L	Standings
5	Montenegro		1–2	3–0	1–1	4–2 (%)	– (%)	1
1	Slovenia	2–1		1–2	1–1	3–3 (%)	– (%)	2
4	North Macedonia	0–3	2–1		1–1	2–4 (%)	– (%)	3

==== Pool B ====
		CYP	MDA	KOS	AZE	RR; W–L	Set; W–L	Game; W–L	Standings
2	Cyprus		2–1	3–0	3–0	3–0	8–1 (%)	– (%)	1
3	Moldova	1–2		3–0	3–0	2–1	7–2 (%)	– (%)	2
7	Kosovo	0–3	0–3		2–1	1–2	2–7 (%)	– (%)	3
6	Azerbaijan	0–3	0–3	1–2		0–3	1–8 (%)	– (%)	4

Standings are determined by: 1. number of wins; 2. number of matches; 3. in two-team ties, head-to-head records; 4. in three-team ties, (a) percentage of sets won (head-to-head records if two teams remain tied), then (b) percentage of games won (head-to-head records if two teams remain tied), then (c) Davis Cup rankings.

=== Playoffs ===
Placing	A Team	Score	B Team
First	Montenegro	1–2	Cyprus
Promotional	Slovenia	2–1	Moldova
Relegation	North Macedonia	2–0	Kosovo

- Cyprus, Montenegro and Slovenia were promoted to 2025 Davis Cup World Group II play-offs and Moldova were also promoted as one of the four highest-ranked non-promoted teams in each 2024 Regional Group III event.
- Azerbaijan and Kosovo were relegated to 2025 Davis Cup Europe Zone Group IV.

== Round Robin ==
=== Pool A ===
==== North Macedonia vs. Montenegro ====
North Macedonia
0
Tennis Club Bellevue, Ulcinj, Montenegro
19 June 2024
Clay

Montenegro
3

			1	2	3
1	(North Macedonia) (Montenegro)	Berk Bugarikj; Petar Jovanovic	2; 6	5; 7
2	(North Macedonia) (Montenegro)	Shendrit Deari; Rrezart Cungu	1; 6	3; 6
3	(North Macedonia) (Montenegro)	Dimitar Grabul / Amar Huseinovic; Simon Knezevic / Matija Samardzic	6; 2	1; 6	5; 7

==== Slovenia vs. North Macedonia ====
Slovenia
1
Tennis Club Bellevue, Ulcinj, Montenegro
20 June 2024
Clay

North Macedonia
2

			1	2	3
1	(Slovenia) (North Macedonia)	Matic Kriznik; Berk Bugarikj	3; 6	3; 6
2	(Slovenia) (North Macedonia)	Bor Artnak; Shendrit Deari	6; 4	7^{7} 6^{5}
3	(Slovenia) (North Macedonia)	Bor Artnak / Sebastian Dominko; Berk Bugarikj / Amar Huseinovic	0; 1			retired

==== Slovenia vs. Montenegro ====
Slovenia
2
Tennis Club Bellevue, Ulcinj, Montenegro
21 June 2024
Clay

Montenegro
1

			1	2	3
1	(Slovenia) (Montenegro)	Sebastian Dominko; Petar Jovanovic	6; 2	3; 6	4; 6
2	(Slovenia) (Montenegro)	Bor Artnak; Rrezart Cungu	6; 2	6; 3
3	(Slovenia) (Montenegro)	Sebastian Dominko / Jan Kupcic; Petar Jovanovic / Matija Samardzic	6; 2	7^{7} 6^{2}

=== Pool B ===
==== Cyprus vs. Azerbaijan ====
Cyprus
3
Tennis Club Bellevue, Ulcinj, Montenegro
19 June 2024
Clay

Azerbaijan
0

			1	2	3
1	(Cyprus) (Azerbaijan)	Stylianos Christodoulou; Safar Rasulov	6; 4	6; 2
2	(Cyprus) (Azerbaijan)	Menelaos Efstathiou; Tamerlan Azizov	6; 3	6; 1
3	(Cyprus) (Azerbaijan)	Sergis Kyratzis / Eleftherios Neos; Tamerlan Azizov / Haktan Garayev	6; 1	6; 1

==== Moldova vs. Kosovo ====
Moldova
3
Tennis Club Bellevue, Ulcinj, Montenegro
19 June 2024
Clay

Kosovo
0

			1	2	3
1	(Moldova) (Kosovo)	Andrei Gorban; Mal Agushi	6; 1	6; 2
2	(Moldova) (Kosovo)	Ilya Snițari; Vullnet Tashi	7; 5	6; 3
3	(Moldova) (Kosovo)	Ilie Cazac / Andrei Ciumac; Jasin Jakupi / Florent Limani	6; 4	6; 4

==== Cyprus vs. Kosovo ====
Cyprus
3
Tennis Club Bellevue, Ulcinj, Montenegro
20 June 2024
Clay

Kosovo
0

			1	2	3
1	(Cyprus) (Kosovo)	Stylianos Christodoulou; Vullnet Tashi	7; 5	6; 2
2	(Cyprus) (Kosovo)	Menelaos Efstathiou; Jasin Jakupi	6; 3	6; 0
3	(Cyprus) (Kosovo)	Sergis Kyratzis / Eleftherios Neos; Mal Agushi / Florent Limani	6; 0	6; 0

==== Moldova vs. Azerbaijan ====
Moldova
3
Tennis Club Bellevue, Ulcinj, Montenegro
20 June 2024
Clay

Azerbaijan
0

			1	2	3
1	(Moldova) (Azerbaijan)	Andrei Gorban; Haktan Garayev	4; 6	6; 2	6; 0
2	(Moldova) (Azerbaijan)	Ilya Snițari; Tamerlan Azizov	6; 0	6; 1
3	(Moldova) (Azerbaijan)	Ilie Cazac / Andrei Ciumac; Tamerlan Azizov / Haktan Garayev	7^{8} 6^{6}	2; 1		retired

==== Cyprus vs. Moldova ====
Cyprus
2
Tennis Club Bellevue, Ulcinj, Montenegro
21 June 2024
Clay

Moldova
1

			1	2	3
1	(Cyprus) (Moldova)	Stylianos Christodoulou; Andrei Gorban	4; 6	6; 0	6; 2
2	(Cyprus) (Moldova)	Menelaos Efstathiou; Ilya Snițari	3; 6	5; 7
3	(Cyprus) (Moldova)	Sergis Kyratzis / Eleftherios Neos; Andrei Ciumac / Ilya Snițari	2; 6	6; 3	6; 3

==== Azerbaijan vs. Kosovo ====
Azerbaijan
1
Tennis Club Bellevue, Ulcinj, Montenegro
21 June 2024
Clay

Kosovo
2

			1	2	3
1	(Azerbaijan) (Kosovo)	Safar Rasulov; Vullnet Tashi	0; 2			retired
2	(Azerbaijan) (Kosovo)	Tamerlan Azizov; Jasin Jakupi	6; 2	4; 6	6; 2
3	(Azerbaijan) (Kosovo)	Tamerlan Azizov / Haktan Garayev; Florent Limani / Vullnet Tashi	0; 6	6; 4	3; 6

== Play-offs ==
=== First place play-off ===
==== Montenegro vs. Cyprus ====
Montenegro
1
Tennis Club Bellevue, Ulcinj, Montenegro
22 June 2024
Clay

Cyprus
2

			1	2	3
1	(Montenegro) (Cyprus)	Matija Samardzic; Nicholas Campbell	2; 6	1; 6
2	(Montenegro) (Cyprus)	Petar Jovanovic; Menelaos Efstathiou	6; 3	6; 3
3	(Montenegro) (Cyprus)	Simon Knezevic / Matija Samardzic; Sergis Kyratzis / Eleftherios Neos	4; 6	6^{3} 7^{7}

=== Promotional play-off ===
==== Slovenia vs. Moldova ====
Slovenia
2
Tennis Club Bellevue, Ulcinj, Montenegro
22 June 2024
Clay

Moldova
1

			1	2	3
1	(Slovenia) (Moldova)	Sebastian Dominko; Andrei Gorban	6; 2	6; 3
2	(Slovenia) (Moldova)	Bor Artnak; Ilya Snițari	4; 6	6; 0	6^{4} 7^{7}
3	(Slovenia) (Moldova)	Sebastian Dominko / Jan Kupcic; Andrei Ciumac / Ilya Snițari	6; 3	6; 3

=== Relegation play-off ===
==== North Macedonia vs. Kosovo ====
North Macedonia
2
Tennis Club Bellevue, Ulcinj, Montenegro
22 June 2024
Clay

Kosovo
0

			1	2	3
1	(North Macedonia) (Kosovo)	Berk Bugarikj; Mal Agushi	6; 2	6; 1
2	(North Macedonia) (Kosovo)	Shendrit Deari; Jasin Jakupi	6; 4	1; 6	6; 3
3	(North Macedonia) (Kosovo)	Berk Bugarikj / Amar Huseinovic; Florent Limani / Vullnet Tashi				not played

== Final placements ==
Placing	Teams
Promoted/First	Cyprus
Promoted/Second	Montenegro
Promoted/Third	Slovenia
Fourth	Moldova
Fifth	North Macedonia
Relegated/Sixth	Kosovo
Relegated/Seventh	Azerbaijan

- Cyprus, Montenegro and Slovenia were promoted to 2025 Davis Cup World Group II play-offs and Moldova were also promoted as one of the four highest-ranked non-promoted teams in each 2024 Regional Group III event.
- Azerbaijan and Kosovo were relegated to 2025 Davis Cup Europe Zone Group IV.
