= Temira Pachmuss =

American literary scholar of Baltic German origin (1927–2007)

- Born: December 24, 1927; Vasknarva, Estonia
- Died: May 1, 2007 (aged 79); Urbana, Illinois, United States
- Occupation: Philologist

Temira Pachmuss (24 December 1927 – 1 May 2007) was a Russian-American philologist.

== Early life and education ==
Pachmuss was born in Vasknarva, Ida-Viru County, Estonia. In 1939, her family moved to Germany. In the 1950s, she moved to Australia, where she received a bachelor's degree in Russian from the University of Melbourne in 1954 and a master's degree in Russian in 1955. In 1955, she moved to the United States. In 1959, she defended her doctoral dissertation at the University of Washington in Seattle.

== Career ==
She started teaching Russian literature at University of Illinois at Urbana-Champaign in 1960, and she was appointed a professor in 1968. Her major fields of research were Russian literature outside Russia, including Russian writers that worked in Finland and Russia. She was especially interested in the legacy of the Russian poet Zinaida Gippius.

She died in Urbana, Illinois, at the age of 79.

== Awards and recognitions ==
In 2001, she received the Order of the White Star, medal class.
