= Yegor Chernyshov (footballer, born 1998) =

Russian footballer

Personal information
- Full name: Yegor Alekseyevich Chernyshov
- Date of birth: 10 July 1998 (age 28)
- Place of birth: Irkutsk, Russia
- Height: 1.82 m (5 ft 11 1/2 in)
- Position: Midfielder

Youth career
- 2014: Baikal Irkutsk

Senior career*
Years	Team	Apps	(Gls)
2015–2016	Sibir-2 Novosibirsk	11	(0)
2016–2019	Zenit Irkutsk	51	(6)
2019–2020	Nosta Novotroitsk	0	(0)
2020	Belshina Bobruisk	1	(0)
2021–2022	Ocean Kerch	30	(12)
- * Club domestic league appearances and goals as of 31 July 2022

Yegor Alekseyevich Chernyshov (Russian: Егор Алексеевич Чернышов; born 10 July 1998) is a Russian football player who plays for Ocean Kerch.

== Club career ==
He made his debut in the Russian Professional Football League for FC Sibir-2 Novosibirsk on 19 July 2015 in a game against FC Irtysh Omsk.
