= MacDougall's =

Auction house based in London, England

MacDougall's is a privately owned international auction house based in London, England. Founded in 2004, it is one of Britain's youngest, but fastest growing auction houses. With around 20 million pounds per year in auction sales, MacDougall's is consistently one of the three largest auction houses in the world for its speciality, Russian Art. The firm has its salerooms in London and representatives in Paris, Moscow, and Kyiv.

== History ==
The firm held its first auction in November 2004.

Two seasons of Russian Art Sales in London - June and December - dominate the world market for Russian Art, with specialised sales at Sotheby's, Christie's, MacDougall's and Bonham's. In 2008 MacDougall's reached second place behind Sotheby's, while in December 2009, it outsold all three competitors in Russian paintings.

In June 2010, MacDougall's sold 900,000 pounds' worth of icons, the largest icon sale of the year, and held its inaugural auction of Russian Works on Paper, the world's first specialist sale in this sector, raising over 1.5m pounds.

== Sources ==
"Battling Russian Billionaires Push London Art Auctions Up 90%", Bloomberg, June 11, 2010

"Profile: MacDougall's Art Auctions, Specialists in the Midas Touch", Daily Telegraph, 23 February 2010

"Russian Art Snapped Up in $65.6 Million Auction, Best in a Year Share Business" Bloomberg Dec. 4 2010

"The art market: Street cred for Caro", Financial Times, November 28, 2009

"MacDougall's", Artchronica (Moscow, in Russian), November 2009

"MacDougall's", Expert (Kiev, in Russian), 4 Oct 2010
