= Jegor Solovjov =

Estonian politician

Jegor Solovjov (also spelled Georgi Solovjov, Jegor Solovjev, Jegor Solovjev; 11 November 1871, Vasknarva – 29 January 1942, Gorky Oblast, Russian SSR) was an Estonian politician.

Solovjov was born in 1871 in Vasknarva (now Alutaguse Parish), in the Wierland County of the Governorate of Estonia. He was a farmer and patron for more than 20 years.

He was elected to the Riigikogu from 1923 to 1926 as a member of a coalition of pro-Russian parties.

Solovjov was arrested on 27 April 1941. He died on 29 January 1942 in Gorky Oblast.
