= Egor Matvievici =

Moldovan tennis player

- Country (sports): Moldova
- Residence: Chișinău, Moldova
- Born: 14 February 1997 (age 28); Chișinău, Moldova
- Plays: Right-handed (two-handed backhand)
- Prize money: $1,762

Singles
- Career record: 0–1 (at ATP Tour level, Grand Slam level, and in Davis Cup)
- Career titles: 0; 0 Challenger, 0 Futures

Doubles
- Career record: 0–0 (at ATP Tour level, Grand Slam level, and in Davis Cup)
- Career titles: 0; 0 Challenger, 0 Futures
- Highest ranking: No. 1,400 (9 December 2019)
- Current ranking: No. 1,412 (30 December 2019)

Team competitions
- Davis Cup: 3–3
- Last updated on: 30 December 2019.

Egor Matvievici (born 28 April 1995) is a Moldovan tennis player.

Matvievici has a career high ATP doubles ranking of 1,400 achieved on 9 December 2019.

Matvievici represents Moldova at the Davis Cup, where he has a W/L record of 3–3.

In January 2020, he participated at the ATP Cup as a member of the Moldovan team.

== Davis Cup ==
=== Participations: (3–3) ===
Group membership World Group (0–0) WG Play-off (0–0) Group I (0–0) Group II (0–1) Group III (3–2) Group IV (0–0)	Matches by surface Hard (0–1) Clay (3–2) Grass (0–0) Carpet (0–0)	Matches by type Singles (1–2) Doubles (2–1)

- ▲ ▼ indicates the outcome of the Davis Cup match followed by the score, date, place of event, the zonal classification and its phase, and the court surface.

Rubber outcome	No.	Rubber	Match type (partner if any)	Opponent nation	Opponent player(s)	Score
▼0–5; 17-19 July 2015; Harare Sports Club Harare, Zimbabwe; Europe/Africa Zone Group II Relegation play-off; Hard surface
Defeat	1	V	Singles (dead rubber)	Zimbabwe	Benjamin Lock	1–6, 0–6
▲3–0; 4 April 2018; Ulcinj Bellevue, Ulcinj, Montenegro; Europe Zone Group III Round robin; Clay surface
Victory	2	I	Singles	Liechtenstein	Timo Kranz	7–6^{(7–4)}, 6–2
Victory	3	III	Doubles (with Vasilii Dontu) (dead rubber)	Liechtenstein	Robin Forster / Serafin Zünd	6–2, 6–3
▼1–2; 5 April 2018; Ulcinj Bellevue, Ulcinj, Montenegro; Europe Zone Group III Round robin; Clay surface
Defeat	4	III	Doubles (with Vasilii Dontu)	Malta	Matthew Asciak / Omar Sudzuka	3–6, 2–6
▲2–1; 6 April 2018; Ulcinj Bellevue, Ulcinj, Montenegro; Europe Zone Group III Round robin; Clay surface
Victory	5	III	Doubles (with Vasilii Dontu)	Kosovo	Granit Bajraliu / Genc Selita	6–3, 6–3
▼0–3; 7 April 2018; Ulcinj Bellevue, Ulcinj, Montenegro; Europe Zone Group III 3rd-4th place playoff; Clay surface
Defeat	6	I	Singles	Greece	Petros Tsitsipas	1–6, 1–6
