= 2019 Davis Cup Europe Zone Group IV =

International tennis competition

The Europe Zone was the unique zone within Group 4 of the regional Davis Cup competition in 2019. The zone's competition was held in round robin format in San Marino, San Marino, from 15 to 20 July 2019.

== Participating nations ==
- Albania
- Andorra
- Armenia
- Cyprus
- Iceland
- Ireland
- Kosovo
- Liechtenstein
- Malta
- San Marino

=== Inactive nations ===
- Azerbaijan
- Moldova

== Draw ==
Date: 15–20 July

Location: Centro Tennis Cassa di Rispamio, San Marino, San Marino (clay)

Format: Round-robin basis.

=== Seeding ===
Pot	Nation	Rank^{1}	Seed
1	Liechtenstein	91	1
1	Ireland	93	2
2	Cyprus	94	3
2	Malta	97	4
3	Iceland	98	5
3	Andorra	108	6
4	Armenia	113	7
4	San Marino	121	8
5	Albania	126	9
5	Kosovo	132	10

- ^{1}Davis Cup Rankings as of 4 February 2019

=== Round Robin ===
==== Pool A ====
		CYP	LIE	ISL	ARM	ALB	RR; W–L	Set; W–L	Game; W–L	Standings
3	Cyprus		3–0	3–0	3–0	3–0	4–0	24–0 (100%)	144–25 (85%)	1
1	Liechtenstein	0–3		2–1	1–2	3–0	2–2	15–12 (56%)	111–121 (49%)	2
5	Iceland	0–3	1–2		2–1	3–0	2–2	12–14 (46%)	108–106 (50%)	3
7	Armenia	0–3	2–1	1–2		3–0	2–2	13–14 (48%)	115–126 (48%)	4
9	Albania	0–3	0–3	0–3	0–3		0–4	0–24 (0%)	46–146 (24%)	5

==== Pool B ====
		IRL	MLT	SMR	KOS	AND	RR; W–L	Set; W–L	Game; W–L	Standings
2	Ireland		3–0	2–1	3–0	3–0	4–0	23–2 (92%)	147–48 (75%)	1
4	Malta	0–3		2–1	3–0	2–1	3–1	14–12 (54%)	113–88 (56%)	2
8	San Marino	1–2	1–2		2–1	2–1	2–2	13–14 (48%)	106–120 (47%)	3
10	Kosovo	0–3	0–3	1–2		2–1	1–3	8–19 (30%)	77–142 (35%)	4
6	Andorra	0–3	1–2	1–2	1–2		0–4	7–18 (28%)	90–135 (40%)	5

Standings are determined by: 1. number of wins; 2. number of matches; 3. in two-team ties, head-to-head records; 4. in three-team ties, (a) percentage of sets won (head-to-head records if two teams remain tied), then (b) percentage of games won (head-to-head records if two teams remain tied), then (c) Davis Cup rankings.

=== Playoffs ===
Placing	A Team	Score	B Team
1st–2nd	Cyprus	2–1	Ireland
3rd–4th	Liechtenstein	3–0	Malta
5th–6th	Iceland	3–0	San Marino
7th–8th	Armenia	3–0	Kosovo
9th–10th	Albania	2–1	Andorra

== Round Robin ==
=== Pool A ===
==== Liechtenstein vs. Armenia ====
Liechtenstein
1
Centro Tennis Cassa di Rispamio, San Marino, San Marino
15–16 July
Clay

Armenia
2

			1	2	3
1	(Liechtenstein) (Armenia)	Timo Kranz; Artur Soghoyan	2; 6	6; 4	4; 6
2	(Liechtenstein) (Armenia)	Vital Flurin Leuch; Mikayel Khachatryan	6; 4	6; 2
3	(Liechtenstein) (Armenia)	Timo Kranz / Vital Flurin Leuch; Mikayel Khachatryan / Artur Soghoyan	0; 6	7^{7} 6^{4}	6^{8} 7^{10}

==== Cyprus vs. Iceland ====
Cyprus
3
Centro Tennis Cassa di Rispamio, San Marino, San Marino
15–16 July
Clay

Iceland
0

			1	2	3
1	(Cyprus) (Iceland)	Menelaos Efstathiou; Birkir Gunnarsson	6; 1	6; 2
2	(Cyprus) (Iceland)	Petros Chrysochos; Egill Sigurðsson	6; 1	6; 1
3	(Cyprus) (Iceland)	Sergis Kyratzis / Eleftherios Neos; Anton Magnusson / Daniel Siddall	6; 2	6; 2

==== Liechtenstein vs. Albania ====
Liechtenstein
3
Centro Tennis Cassa di Rispamio, San Marino, San Marino
16 July
Clay

Albania
0

			1	2	3
1	(Liechtenstein) (Albania)	Robin Forster; Martin Muedini	6; 2	6; 1
2	(Liechtenstein) (Albania)	Vital Flurin Leuch; Elbi Mjeshtri	7^{8} 6^{6}	6; 4
3	(Liechtenstein) (Albania)	Robin Forster / Christian Meier; Elbi Mjeshtri / Genajd Shypheja	6; 4	6; 2

==== Cyprus vs. Armenia ====
Cyprus
3
Centro Tennis Cassa di Rispamio, San Marino, San Marino
16 July
Clay

Armenia
0

			1	2	3
1	(Cyprus) (Armenia)	Menelaos Efstathiou; Artur Soghoyan	6; 1	6; 1
2	(Cyprus) (Armenia)	Petros Chrysochos; Mikayel Khachatryan	6; 2	6; 0
3	(Cyprus) (Armenia)	Sergis Kyratzis / Eleftherios Neos; Daniel Karapetyan / Sedrak Khachatryan	6; 0	6; 1

==== Liechtenstein vs. Iceland ====
Liechtenstein
2
Centro Tennis Cassa di Rispamio, San Marino, San Marino
17 July
Clay

Iceland
1

			1	2	3
1	(Liechtenstein) (Iceland)	Timo Kranz; Daniel Siddall	1; 6	6; 4	0; 6
2	(Liechtenstein) (Iceland)	Vital Flurin Leuch; Anton Magnusson	6; 4	6; 1
3	(Liechtenstein) (Iceland)	Timo Kranz / Vital Flurin Leuch; Birkir Gunnarsson / Daniel Siddall	6; 2	6; 2

==== Armenia vs. Albania ====
Armenia
3
Centro Tennis Cassa di Rispamio, San Marino, San Marino
17 July
Clay

Albania
0

			1	2	3
1	(Armenia) (Albania)	Artur Soghoyan; Rajan Dushi	6; 2	6; 1
2	(Armenia) (Albania)	Mikayel Khachatryan; Elbi Mjeshtri	6; 3	7^{7} 6^{3}
3	(Armenia) (Albania)	Mikayel Khachatryan / Artur Soghoyan; Martin Muedini / Genajd Shypheja	6; 3	6; 0

==== Cyprus vs. Albania ====
Cyprus
3
Centro Tennis Cassa di Rispamio, San Marino, San Marino
18 July
Clay

Albania
0

			1	2	3
1	(Cyprus) (Albania)	Menelaos Efstathiou; Martin Muedini	6; 0	6; 1
2	(Cyprus) (Albania)	Petros Chrysochos; Rajan Dushi	6; 0	6; 1
3	(Cyprus) (Albania)	Sergis Kyratzis / Eleftherios Neos; Rajan Dushi / Martin Muedini	6; 2	6; 1

==== Iceland vs. Armenia ====
Iceland
2
Centro Tennis Cassa di Rispamio, San Marino, San Marino
18 July
Clay

Armenia
1

			1	2	3
1	(Iceland) (Armenia)	Birkir Gunnarsson; Artur Soghoyan	4; 6	4; 6
2	(Iceland) (Armenia)	Egill Sigurðsson; Mikayel Khachatryan	7; 5	6; 2
3	(Iceland) (Armenia)	Birkir Gunnarsson / Daniel Siddall; Mikayel Khachatryan / Artur Soghoyan	4; 6	7^{7} 6^{2}	6; 1

==== Liechtenstein vs. Cyprus ====
Liechtenstein
0
Centro Tennis Cassa di Rispamio, San Marino, San Marino
19 July
Clay

Cyprus
3

			1	2	3
1	(Liechtenstein) (Cyprus)	Robin Forster; Menelaos Efstathiou	0; 6	1; 6
2	(Liechtenstein) (Cyprus)	Vital Flurin Leuch; Petros Chrysochos	1; 6	3; 6
3	(Liechtenstein) (Cyprus)	Robin Forster / Christian Meier; Sergis Kyratzis / Eleftherios Neos	0; 6	1; 6

==== Iceland vs. Albania ====
Iceland
3
Centro Tennis Cassa di Rispamio, San Marino, San Marino
19 July
Clay

Albania
0

			1	2	3
1	(Iceland) (Albania)	Daniel Siddall; Genajd Shypheja	6; 0	6; 1
2	(Iceland) (Albania)	Egill Sigurðsson; Elbi Mjeshtri	6; 3	6; 2
3	(Iceland) (Albania)	Birkir Gunnarsson / Daniel Siddall; Martin Muedini / Genajd Shypheja	6; 0	6; 1

=== Pool B ===
==== Ireland vs. San Marino ====
Ireland
2
Centro Tennis Cassa di Rispamio, San Marino, San Marino
15–16 July
Clay

San Marino
1

			1	2	3
1	(Republic of Ireland) (San Marino)	Simon Carr; Filippo Tommesani	6; 0	6; 2
2	(Republic of Ireland) (San Marino)	Peter Bothwell; Marco De Rossi	7; 5	3; 6	4; 6
3	(Republic of Ireland) (San Marino)	Peter Bothwell / Julian Bradley; Filippo Tommesani / Domenico Vicini	6; 1	6; 0

==== Malta vs. Andorra ====
Malta
2
Centro Tennis Cassa di Rispamio, San Marino, San Marino
15–16 July
Clay

Andorra
1

			1	2	3
1	(Malta) (Andorra)	Matthew Asciak; Jesús Muro-Loscertales	4; 1			retired
2	(Malta) (Andorra)	Matthew Cassar Torregiani; Ricardo Rodeiro-Stetson	2; 6	3; 6
3	(Malta) (Andorra)	Matthew Asciak / Omar Sudzuka; Èric Cervós Noguer / Ricardo Rodeiro-Stetson	6; 4	6; 3

==== Ireland vs. Kosovo ====
Ireland
3
Centro Tennis Cassa di Rispamio, San Marino, San Marino
16 July
Clay

Kosovo
0

			1	2	3
1	(Republic of Ireland) (Kosovo)	Simon Carr; Genc Selita	6; 0	6; 2
2	(Republic of Ireland) (Kosovo)	Peter Bothwell; Granit Bajraliu	6; 2	6; 0
3	(Republic of Ireland) (Kosovo)	Julian Bradley / Osgar O'Hoisin; Burim Bytyqi / Muhamed Zulji	6; 1	6; 0

==== Malta vs. San Marino ====
Malta
2
Centro Tennis Cassa di Rispamio, San Marino, San Marino
16 July
Clay

San Marino
1

			1	2	3
1	(Malta) (San Marino)	Matthew Asciak; Tommaso Simoncini	6; 1	6; 0
2	(Malta) (San Marino)	Matthew Cassar Torregiani; Marco De Rossi	1; 6	2; 6
3	(Malta) (San Marino)	Matthew Asciak / Omar Sudzuka; Marco De Rossi / Domenico Vicini	6; 1	5; 7	6; 1

==== Ireland vs. Andorra ====
Ireland
3
Centro Tennis Cassa di Rispamio, San Marino, San Marino
17 July
Clay

Andorra
0

			1	2	3
1	(Republic of Ireland) (Andorra)	Simon Carr; Èric Cervós Noguer	6; 2	6; 0
2	(Republic of Ireland) (Andorra)	Peter Bothwell; Ricardo Rodeiro-Stetson	6; 3	6; 0
3	(Republic of Ireland) (Andorra)	Peter Bothwell / Julian Bradley; Èric Cervós Noguer / Guillermo Jáuregui	6; 2	6; 2

==== San Marino vs. Kosovo ====
San Marino
2
Centro Tennis Cassa di Rispamio, San Marino, San Marino
17 July
Clay

Kosovo
1

			1	2	3
1	(San Marino) (Kosovo)	Domenico Vicini; Genc Selita	6; 3	4; 6	6; 3
2	(San Marino) (Kosovo)	Filippo Tommesani; Granit Bajraliu	4; 6	0; 6
3	(San Marino) (Kosovo)	Marco De Rossi / Domenico Vicini; Granit Bajraliu / Burim Bytyqi	6; 1	6; 0

==== Malta vs. Kosovo ====
Malta
3
Centro Tennis Cassa di Rispamio, San Marino, San Marino
18 July
Clay

Kosovo
0

			1	2	3
1	(Malta) (Kosovo)	Denzil Agius; Burim Bytyqi	6; 2	2; 6	6; 0
2	(Malta) (Kosovo)	Matthew Asciak; Granit Bajraliu	6; 0	6; 0
3	(Malta) (Kosovo)	Matthew Asciak / Omar Sudzuka; Burim Bytyqi / Muhamed Zulji	6; 0	6; 1

==== Andorra vs. San Marino ====
Andorra
1
Centro Tennis Cassa di Rispamio, San Marino, San Marino
18 July
Clay

San Marino
2

			1	2	3
1	(Andorra) (San Marino)	Èric Cervós Noguer; Domenico Vicini	3; 6	6^{9} 7^{11}
2	(Andorra) (San Marino)	Ricardo Rodeiro-Stetson; Marco De Rossi	2; 6	1; 6
3	(Andorra) (San Marino)	Èric Cervós Noguer / Guillermo Jáuregui; Tommaso Simoncini / Filippo Tommesani	6; 1	7^{7} 6^{2}

==== Ireland vs. Malta ====
Ireland
3
Centro Tennis Cassa di Rispamio, San Marino, San Marino
19 July
Clay

Malta
0

			1	2	3
1	(Republic of Ireland) (Malta)	Simon Carr; Omar Sudzuka	6; 0	6; 2
2	(Republic of Ireland) (Malta)	Peter Bothwell; Matthew Asciak	7; 5	6; 0
3	(Republic of Ireland) (Malta)	Julian Bradley / Osgar O'Hoisin; Matthew Cassar Torregiani / Omar Sudzuka	6; 4	6; 3

==== Andorra vs. Kosovo ====
Andorra
1
Centro Tennis Cassa di Rispamio, San Marino, San Marino
19 July
Clay

Kosovo
2

			1	2	3
1	(Andorra) (Kosovo)	Èric Cervós Noguer; Genc Selita	6; 3	6; 4
2	(Andorra) (Kosovo)	Ricardo Rodeiro-Stetson; Granit Bajraliu	6^{4} 7^{7}	4; 6
3	(Andorra) (Kosovo)	Èric Cervós Noguer / Guillermo Jáuregui; Granit Bajraliu / Genc Selita	7^{7} 6^{5}	3; 6	4; 6

== Playoffs ==
=== 1st to 2nd playoff ===
==== Cyprus vs. Ireland ====
Cyprus
2
Centro Tennis Cassa di Rispamio, San Marino, San Marino
20 July
Clay

Ireland
1

			1	2	3
1	(Cyprus) (Republic of Ireland)	Menelaos Efstathiou; Simon Carr	3; 6	1; 6
2	(Cyprus) (Republic of Ireland)	Petros Chrysochos; Peter Bothwell	7; 5	6; 3
3	(Cyprus) (Republic of Ireland)	Petros Chrysochos / Sergis Kyratzis; Peter Bothwell / Julian Bradley	6; 2	2; 6	7^{7} 6^{0}

=== 3rd to 4th playoff ===
==== Liechtenstein vs. Malta ====
Liechtenstein
3
Centro Tennis Cassa di Rispamio, San Marino, San Marino
20 July
Clay

Malta
0

			1	2	3
1	(Liechtenstein) (Malta)	Timo Kranz; Omar Sudzuka	6; 1	6; 4
2	(Liechtenstein) (Malta)	Vital Flurin Leuch; Matthew Cassar Torregiani	6; 0	6; 0
3	(Liechtenstein) (Malta)	Timo Kranz / Vital Flurin Leuch; Denzil Agius / Omar Sudzuka	6; 2	6; 1

=== 5th to 6th playoff ===
==== Iceland vs. San Marino ====
Iceland
3
Centro Tennis Cassa di Rispamio, San Marino, San Marino
20 July
Clay

San Marino
0

			1	2	3
1	(Iceland) (San Marino)	Daniel Siddall; Domenico Vicini	6; 3	7^{7} 6^{2}
2	(Iceland) (San Marino)	Egill Sigurðsson; Filippo Tommesani	6; 1	6; 0
3	(Iceland) (San Marino)	Birkir Gunnarsson / Anton Magnusson; Tommaso Simoncini / Filippo Tommesani	6; 4	6; 1

=== 7th to 8th playoff ===
==== Armenia vs. Kosovo ====
Armenia
3
Centro Tennis Cassa di Rispamio, San Marino, San Marino
20 July
Clay

Kosovo
0

			1	2	3
1	(Armenia) (Kosovo)	Artur Soghoyan; Muhamed Zulji	6; 0	6; 3
2	(Armenia) (Kosovo)	Sedrak Khachatryan; Burim Bytyqi	6; 1	6; 2
3	(Armenia) (Kosovo)	Mikayel Khachatryan / Artur Soghoyan; Burim Bytyqi / Muhamed Zulji	6; 2	6; 3

=== 9th to 10th playoff ===
==== Albania vs. Andorra ====
Albania
2
Centro Tennis Cassa di Rispamio, San Marino, San Marino
20 July
Clay

Andorra
1

			1	2	3
1	(Albania) (Andorra)	Martin Muedini; Guillermo Jáuregui	6; 2	6; 1
2	(Albania) (Andorra)	Rajan Dushi; Èric Cervós Noguer	1; 6	1; 6
3	(Albania) (Andorra)	Martin Muedini / Genajd Shypheja; Èric Cervós Noguer / Guillermo Jáuregui				w/o
