= Èric Cervós Noguer =

Andorran tennis player

- Country (sports): Andorra
- Born: 18 May 1999 (age 26)

Singles
- Career record: 0–0 (at ATP Tour level, Grand Slam level, and in Davis Cup)
- Career titles: 0

Doubles
- Career record: 0–0 (at ATP Tour level, Grand Slam level, and in Davis Cup)
- Career titles: 0

Team competitions
- Davis Cup: 7–21
- Last updated on: 30 August 2021.

Èric Cervós Noguer (born 18 May 1999) is an Andorran tennis player.

Cervós Noguer represents Andorra at the Davis Cup, where he has a W/L record of 7–21. He was selected to represent Andorra at the 2017 Games of the Small States of Europe.

== Davis Cup ==
=== Participations: (7–21) ===
Group membership World Group (0–0) WG Play-off (0–0) Group I (0–0) Group II (0–0) Group III (2–11) Group IV (5–10)	Matches by surface Hard (2–5) Clay (5–16) Grass (0–0) Carpet (0–0)	Matches by type Singles (3–11) Doubles (4–10)

- ▲ ▼ indicates the outcome of the Davis Cup match followed by the score, date, place of event, the zonal classification and its phase, and the court surface.

Rubber outcome	No.	Rubber	Match type (partner if any)	Opponent nation	Opponent player(s)	Score
▼0–3; 3 March 2016; Tere Tennis Centre, Tallinn, Estonia; Europe/Africa Zone Group III Round Robin; Hard (i) surface
Defeat	1	I	Singles	Cyprus	Petros Chrysochos	0–6, 0–6
▲2–1; 4 March 2016; Tere Tennis Centre, Tallinn, Estonia; Europe/Africa Zone Group III Round Robin; Hard (i) surface
Defeat	2	I	Singles	Iceland	Rafn Kumar Bonifacius	2–6, 4–6
▲2–1; 5 March 2016; Tere Tennis Centre, Tallinn, Estonia; Europe/Africa Zone Group III 9th-12th place play off; Hard (i) surface
Defeat	3	III	Doubles (with Laurent Recouderc) (dead rubber)	Armenia	Sedrak Khachatryan / Henrik Nikoghosyan	6–2, 3–6, 4–6
▼0–3; 6 April 2017; Holiday Village Santa Marina, Sozopol, Bulgaria; Europe/Africa Zone Group III Round Robin; Hard surface
Defeat	4	III	Doubles (with Laurent Recouderc) (dead rubber)	(Republic of Ireland) Ireland	Sam Barry / David O'Hare	3–6, 0–6
▼1–2; 7 April 2017; Holiday Village Santa Marina, Sozopol, Bulgaria; Europe/Africa Zone Group III Round Robin; Hard surface
Victory	5	III	Doubles (with Jean-Baptiste Poux-Gautier) (dead rubber)	Montenegro	Mario Aleksić / Pavle Rogan	7–5, 6–2
▲3–0; 8 April 2017; Holiday Village Santa Marina, Sozopol, Bulgaria; Europe/Africa Zone Group III Round Robin; Hard surface
Victory	6	III	Doubles (with Laurent Recouderc) (dead rubber)	Kosovo	Granit Bajraliu / Hyda Banjska	3–6, 6–4, 6–3
▼1–2; 8 April 2017; Holiday Village Santa Marina, Sozopol, Bulgaria; Europe/Africa Zone Group III 9th-12th place play off; Hard surface
Defeat	7	I	Singles	Armenia	Mikayel Khachatryan	3–6, 1–6
▼0–3; 4 April 2018; Tennis Club Lokomotiv, Plovdiv, Bulgaria; Europe/Africa Zone Group III Round Robin; Clay surface
Defeat	8	I	Singles	Cyprus	Menelaos Efstathiou	0–6, 0–6
Defeat	9	III	Doubles (with Guillermo Jauregui) (dead rubber)	Cyprus	Nicholas Campbell / Eleftherios Neos	2–6, 3–6
▼0–3; 5 April 2018; Tennis Club Lokomotiv, Plovdiv, Bulgaria; Europe/Africa Zone Group III Round Robin; Clay surface
Defeat	10	III	Doubles (with Guillermo Jauregui) (dead rubber)	Monaco	Benjamin Balleret / Thomas Oger	0–6, 2–6
▲2–1; 6 April 2018; Tennis Club Lokomotiv, Plovdiv, Bulgaria; Europe/Africa Zone Group III Round Robin; Clay surface
Defeat	11	II	Singles	San Marino	Marco de Rossi	3–6, 1–6
▼0–3; 7 April 2018; Tennis Club Lokomotiv, Plovdiv, Bulgaria; Europe/Africa Zone Group III 5th-6th place play off; Clay surface
Defeat	12	II	Singles	Iceland	Birkir Gunnarsson	6–2, 2–6, 3–6
Defeat	13	III	Doubles (with Guillermo Jauregui) (dead rubber)	Iceland	Vladimir Ristic / Egill Sigurðsson	1–6, 3–6
▼1–2; 16 July 2019; Centro Tennis Cassa di Risparmio, City of San Marino, San Marino; Europe Zone Group IV Round Robin; Clay surface
Defeat	14	III	Doubles (with Ricardo Rodeiro-Stetson)	Malta	Matthew Asciak / Omar Sudzuka	4–6, 3–6
▼0–3; 16 July 2019; Centro Tennis Cassa di Risparmio, City of San Marino, San Marino; Europe Zone Group IV Round Robin; Clay surface
Defeat	15	I	Singles	(Republic of Ireland) Ireland	Simon Carr	2–6, 0–6
Defeat	16	III	Doubles (with Guillermo Jauregui) (dead rubber)	(Republic of Ireland) Ireland	Peter Bothwell / Julian Bradley	2–6, 2–6
▼1–2; 18 July 2019; Centro Tennis Cassa di Risparmio, City of San Marino, San Marino; Europe Zone Group IV Round Robin; Clay surface
Defeat	17	I	Singles	San Marino	Domenico Vicini	3–6, 6–7^{(9–11)}
Victory	18	III	Doubles (with Guillermo Jauregui) (dead rubber)	San Marino	Tommaso Simoncini / Filippo Tommesani	6–1, 7–6^{(7–2)}
▼1–2; 19 July 2019; Centro Tennis Cassa di Risparmio, City of San Marino, San Marino; Europe Zone Group IV Round Robin; Clay surface
Victory	19	I	Singles	Kosovo	Genc Selita	6–3, 6–4
Defeat	20	III	Doubles (with Guillermo Jauregui)	Kosovo	Granit Bajraliu / Genc Selita	7–6^{(7–5)}, 3–6, 4–6
▼1–2; 20 July 2019; Centro Tennis Cassa di Risparmio, City of San Marino, San Marino; EuropeZone Group IV 9th-10th place play off; Clay surface
Victory	21	II	Singles	Albania	Rajan Dushi	6–1, 6–1
Defeat	–	III	Doubles (with Guillermo Jauregui)	Albania	Martin Muedini / Genajd Shypheja	w/o *
▼0–3; 22 June 2021; Tennis Club Jug-Skopje, Skopje, North Macedonia; Europe Zone Group IV Round Robin; Clay surface
Defeat	22	II	Singles	Moldova	Alexander Cozbinov	0–6, 0–6
Defeat	23	III	Doubles (with Damien Gelabert) (dead rubber)	Moldova	Alexander Cozbinov / Ilya Snitari	1–6, 1–6
▼0–3; 23 June 2021; Tennis Club Jug-Skopje, Skopje, North Macedonia; Europe Zone Group IV Round Robin; Clay surface
Defeat	24	II	Singles	North Macedonia	Gorazd Srbljak	0–6, 1–6
▲3–0; 25 June 2021; Tennis Club Jug-Skopje, Skopje, North Macedonia; Europe Zone Group IV Round Robin; Clay surface
Victory	25	II	Singles	Kosovo	Fresk Sylhasi	6–1, 6–1
Victory	26	III	Doubles (with Jordi Trilla Clanchet) (dead rubber)	Kosovo	Granit Bajraliu / Meldin Mustafi	4–6, 6–2, 7–5
▼1–2; 26 June 2021; Tennis Club Jug-Skopje, Skopje, North Macedonia; Europe Zone Group IV Round Robin; Clay surface
Defeat	27	II	Singles	San Marino	Marco De Rossi	4–6, 2–6
Defeat	28	III	Doubles (with Damien Gelabert)	San Marino	Marco De Rossi / Stefano Galvani	4–6, 1–6

* Walkover doesn't count in his overall record.
