= Eleftherios Neos =

Cypriot tennis player (born 1999)

- Country (sports): Cyprus
- Born: 6 September 1999 (age 27) Paralimni, Cyprus
- Height: 1.88 m (6 ft 2 in)
- Plays: Left-handed (two-handed backhand)
- College: Portland Pilots
- Prize money: US $21,224

Singles
- Career record: 0–1 (at ATP Tour level, Grand Slam level, and in Davis Cup)
- Career titles: 0

Doubles
- Career record: 2–4 (at ATP Tour level, Grand Slam level, and in Davis Cup)
- Career titles: 0
- Highest ranking: No. 301 (21 September 2026)
- Current ranking: No. 321 (9 November 2026)

Team competitions
- Davis Cup: 12–7
- Last updated on: 9 November 2026.

Eleftherios Neos
Medal record

Men's tennis

Representing Cyprus

Mediterranean Games
Bronze medal – third place	2026 Taranto	Doubles

Eleftherios Neos (born 6 September 1999) is a Cypriot tennis player. Neos has a career high ATP doubles ranking of No. 301 achieved on 21 September 2026.

Neos represents Cyprus at the Davis Cup where he has a W/L record of 12–7.

Neos studied and played college tennis at the University of Portland.

== ATP Challenger and ITF World Tennis Tour finals ==
=== Doubles: 4 (2–2) ===
Legend ATP Challenger Tour (0–0) ITF World Tennis Tour (2–2)	Finals by surface Hard (2–1) Clay (0–1)

Result	W–L	Date	Tournament	Tier	Surface	Partner	Opponents	Score
Loss	0–1	May 2023	M15 Alaminos, Cyprus	World Tour	Clay	(Cyprus) Sergis Kyratzis	(Germany) Niklas Schell (Germany) Paul Wörner	5–7, 6–3, [7–10]
Win	1–1	Oct 2023	M15 Heraklion, Greece	World Tour	Hard	(Cyprus) Stylianos Christodoulou	(Netherlands) Sidane Pontjodikromo (Netherlands) Niels Visker	2–6, 7–6^{(7–3)}, [10–8]
Loss	1–2	Nov 2023	M15 Heraklion, Greece	World Tour	Hard	(Cyprus) Sergis Kyratzis	(Austria) Neil Oberleitner (Austria) Joel Schwärzler	0–6, 3–6
Win	2–2	Dec 2023	M15 Limassol, Cyprus	World Tour	Hard	(Cyprus) Menelaos Efstathiou	(Cyprus) Petros Chrysochos (Cyprus) Sergis Kyratzis	3–6, 6–0, [10–5]

== National representation ==
=== Davis Cup ===
==== Participations: (13–7) ====
Group membership World Group (0–0) WG play-off (0–0) Group I (0–0) Group II (1–3) Group III (8–4) Group IV (4–0)	Matches by surface Hard (5–4) Clay (8–3) Grass (0–0) Carpet (0–0)	Matches by type Singles (0–1) Doubles (13–6)

- ▲ ▼ indicates the outcome of the Davis Cup match followed by the score, date, place of event, the zonal classification and its phase, and the court surface.

Rubber outcome	No.	Rubber	Match type (partner if any)	Opponent nation	Opponent player(s)	Score
▼1–4; 3–5 February 2017; National Tennis Centre, Nicosia, Cyprus; Europe/Africa first round; hard surface
Victory	1	III	Doubles (with Petros Chrysochos)	Turkey	Altuğ Çelikbilek / Cem İlkel	3–6, 5–7, 7–6^{(7–3)}, 6–4, 6–1
▼1–4; 7–9 April 2017; National Tennis Centre, Nicosia, Cyprus; Europe/Africa relegation play-off; hard surface
Defeat	2	V	Singles (dead rubber)	Tunisia	Moez Echargui	3–6, 2–6
▲3–0; 4 April 2018; Tennis Club Lokomotiv, Plovdiv, Bulgaria; Europe round robin; clay surface
Victory	3	III	Doubles (with Nicholas Campbell)	Andorra	Èric Cervós Noguer / Guillermo Jauregui	6–2, 6–3
▲2–1; 5 April 2018; Tennis Club Lokomotiv, Plovdiv, Bulgaria; Europe round robin; clay surface
Victory	4	III	Doubles (with Petros Chrysochos)	San Marino	Tommaso Simoncini / Filippo Tommesani	6–1, 6–1
▼1–2; 6 April 2018; Tennis Club Lokomotiv, Plovdiv, Bulgaria; Europe round robin; clay surface
Defeat	5	III	Doubles (with Petros Chrysochos)	Monaco	Romain Arneodo / Benjamin Balleret	2–6, 3–6
▲3–0; 15 July 2019; Centro Tennis Cassa di Risparmio, City of San Marino, San Marino; Europe round robin; clay surface
Victory	6	III	Doubles (with Sergis Kyratzis) (dead rubber)	Iceland	Anton Magnússon / Daniel Siddall	6–2, 6–2
▲3–0; 16 July 2019; Centro Tennis Cassa di Risparmio, City of San Marino, San Marino; Europe round robin; clay surface
Victory	7	III	Doubles (with Sergis Kyratzis) (dead rubber)	Armenia	Daniel Karapetyan / Sedrak Khachatryan	6–0, 6–1
▲3–0; 18 July 2019; Centro Tennis Cassa di Risparmio, City of San Marino, San Marino; Europe round robin; clay surface
Victory	8	III	Doubles (with Sergis Kyratzis) (dead rubber)	Albania	Rajan Dushi / Martin Muedini	6–2, 6–1
▲3–0; 19 July 2019; Centro Tennis Cassa di Risparmio, City of San Marino, San Marino; Europe round robin; clay surface
Victory	9	III	Doubles (with Sergis Kyratzis) (dead rubber)	Liechtenstein	Robin Forster / Christian Meier	6–0, 6–1
▲3–0; 17 June 2021; Herodotou Tennis Academy, Larnaca, Cyprus; Europe Group III round robin; hard surface
Victory	10	III	Doubles (with Sergis Kyratzis) (dead rubber)	Iceland	Daniel Siddall / Egill Sigurðsson	7–5, 7–5
▲3–0; 18 June 2021; Herodotou Tennis Academy, Larnaca, Cyprus; Europe Group III round robin; hard surface
Victory	11	III	Doubles (with Sergis Kyratzis) (dead rubber)	(Georgia (country)) Georgia	Saba Purtseladze / Zura Tkemaladze	4–6, 6–3, 6–2
▼1–2; 19 June 2021; Herodotou Tennis Academy, Larnaca, Cyprus; Europe Group III Final; hard surface
Defeat	12	III	Doubles (with Sergis Kyratzis)	Monaco	Romain Arneodo / Hugo Nys	2–6, 4–6
▼1–4; 4–5 March 2022; Gezira Sporting Club, Cairo, Egypt; World Group II play-offs; clay surface
Defeat	13	III	Doubles (with Petros Chrysochos)	Egypt	Karim-Mohamed Maamoun / Mohamed Safwat	6–4, 3–6, 4–6
▲3–0; 22 June 2021; Tennis Club Bellevue, Ulcinj, Montenegro; Europe Group III round robin; clay surface
Victory	14	III	Doubles (with Sergis Kyratzis) (dead rubber)	Liechtenstein	Eric Peppard / Andrej Spasojevic	6–0, 6–0
▲3–0; 23 June 2021; Tennis Club Bellevue, Ulcinj, Montenegro; Europe Group III round robin; clay surface
Victory	15	III	Doubles (with Sergis Kyratzis) (dead rubber)	Armenia	Ashot Mkrtchyan / Henrik Nikoghosyan	6–2, 6–2
▼0–3; 24 June 2021; Tennis Club Bellevue, Ulcinj, Montenegro; Europe Group III round robin; clay surface
Defeat	16	III	Doubles (with Sergis Kyratzis) (dead rubber)	(Georgia (country)) Georgia	Aleksandre Bakshi / Zura Tkemaladze	1–6, 7–6^{(7–4)}, 4–6
▼2–3; 3–4 February 2023; Cité Nationale Sportive El Menzah, Tunis, Tunisia; World Group II play-offs; hard surface
Defeat	17	III	Doubles (with Sergis Kyratzis)	Tunisia	Aziz Dougaz / Skander Mansouri	2–6, 6–4, 2–6
▼0–3; 14 June 2023; Herodotou Tennis Academy, Larnaca, Cyprus; Europe Group III round robin; hard surface
Defeat	18	III	Doubles (with Sergis Kyratzis) (dead rubber)	Moldova	Alexander Cozbinov / Ilya Snițari	5–7, 3–6
▲3–0; 15 June 2023; Herodotou Tennis Academy, Larnaca, Cyprus; Europe Group III round robin; hard surface
Victory	19	III	Doubles (with Sergis Kyratzis) (dead rubber)	Malta	Alex Degabriele / Liam Delicata	6–2, 6–1
▲3–0; 16 June 2023; Herodotou Tennis Academy, Larnaca, Cyprus; Europe Group III round robin; hard surface
Victory	20	III	Doubles (with Sergis Kyratzis) (dead rubber)	North Macedonia	Amar Huseinovic / Obrad Markovski	6–0, 6–4

=== Games of the Small States of Europe ===
==== Doubles 2 (2 victory) ====
Outcome	No.	Date	Tournament	Surface	Partner	Opponent	Score
Victory	1.	2 June 2017	City of San Marino, San Marino	Clay	(Cyprus) Menelaos Efstathiou	(Monaco) Florent Diep (Monaco) Thomas Oger	5–7, 6–2, [10–5]
Victory	2.	1 June 2019	Budva, Montenegro	Clay	(Cyprus) Menelaos Efstathiou	(Monaco) Lucas Catarina (Monaco) Romain Arneodo	6–1, 7–5

==== Mixed Doubles 3 (2 victories; 1 runner-up) ====
Outcome	No.	Date	Tournament	Surface	Partner	Opponent	Score
Runner-up	1.	2 June 2017	City of San Marino, San Marino	Clay	(Cyprus) Raluca Șerban	(Luxembourg) Eléonora Molinaro (Luxembourg) Ugo Nastasi	3–6, 4–6
Victory	2.	1 June 2019	Budva, Montenegro	Clay	(Cyprus) Raluca Șerban	(Montenegro) Vladica Babić (Montenegro) Rrezart Cungu	6–4, 3–6, [10–7]
Victory	3.	2 June 2023	Marsa, Malta	Clay	(Cyprus) Maria Constantinou	(Luxembourg) Eléonora Molinaro (Luxembourg) Alex Knaff	6–7, 6–3, [10–6]
