= Ilya Snițari =

Moldovan tennis player

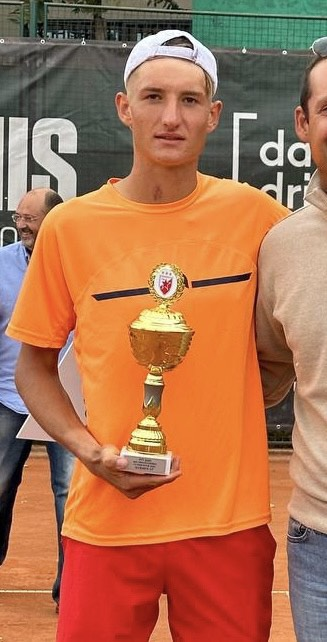
- Snițari in 2023
- Country (sports): Moldova
- Born: 20 March 2002 (age 24) Chișinău, Moldova
- Height: 1.88 m (6 ft 2 in)
- Plays: Right-handed (two-handed backhand)
- Prize money: US $71,558

Singles
- Career record: 2–2
- Career titles: 4 ITF
- Highest ranking: No. 479 (19 December 2022)
- Current ranking: No. 924 (10 August 2026)

Doubles
- Career record: 0–1
- Career titles: 12 ITF
- Highest ranking: No. 332 (17 April 2023)
- Current ranking: No. 884 (10 August 2026)

Team competitions
- Davis Cup: 26–11
- Last updated on: 21 August 2026.

Ilya Snițari (born 20 March 2002) is a Moldovan tennis player. Snițari has a career high ATP singles ranking of world No. 479 achieved on 19 December 2022 and a career high ATP doubles ranking of world No. 332 achieved on 17 April 2023. Snițari has won 4 singles and 12 doubles ITF titles. He is currently the No. 2 Moldovan player.

Snițari has represented Moldova at Davis Cup. In Davis Cup he has a win-loss record of 26–11.

== ITF and Challenger finals ==
=== Singles: 9 (4–5) ===
Legend (singles) ATP Challenger Tour (0–0) ITF World Tennis Tour (4–5)	Titles by surface Hard (0–0) Clay (4–5) Grass (0–0) Carpet (0–0)

Result	W–L	Date	Tournament	Tier	Surface	Opponent	Score
Loss	0–1	Sep 2021	M15 Chornomorsk, Ukraine	World Tennis Tour	Clay	(Ukraine) Illya Beloborodko	6–7^{(3–7)}, 6–7^{(6–8)}
Loss	0–2	Apr 2022	M15 Antalya, Turkey	World Tennis Tour	Clay	(France) Mathys Erhard	4–6, 1–6
Win	1–2	Sep 2022	M15 Constanța, Romania	World Tennis Tour	Clay	(Ukraine) Oleksandr Bielinskyi	6–1, 6–3
Loss	1–3	Sep 2022	M15 Zlatibor, Serbia	World Tennis Tour	Clay	(Belgium) Gauthier Onclin	1–6, 4–6
Win	2–3	Dec 2022	M15 Antalya, Turkey	World Tennis Tour	Clay	Savva Polukhin	5–7, 6–3, 7–5
Loss	2–4	Apr 2024	M15 Kursumlijska Banja, Serbia	World Tennis Tour	Clay	(Serbia) Stefan Popovic	4–6, 1–6
Loss	2–5	May 2024	M15 Constanța, Romania	World Tennis Tour	Clay	(Romania) Gabi Adrian Boitan	2–6, 4–6
Win	3–5	Aug 2024	M15 Târgu Jiu, Romania	World Tennis Tour	Clay	(Romania) Dan Alexandru Tomescu	7–5, 6–2
Win	4–5	Jul 2025	M15 Slobozia, Romania	World Tennis Tour	Clay	(Romania) Radu David Țurcanu	6–2, 2–6, 6–4

=== Doubles 15 (9–6) ===
Legend (doubles) ATP Challenger Tour (0–0) ITF World Tennis Tour (9–6)	Titles by surface Hard (0–1) Clay (9–5) Grass (0–0) Carpet (0–0)

Result	W–L	Date	Tournament	Tier	Surface	Partner	Opponents	Score
Win	1–0	Aug 2021	M25 Bacău, Romania	World Tennis Tour	Clay	(Tunisia) Moez Echargui	(Romania) Vladimir Filip (Sweden) Dragoș Nicolae Mădăraș	7–5, 6–3
Loss	1–1	Sep 2021	M15 Vyshkovo, Ukraine	World Tennis Tour	Clay	(Belgium) Romain Faucon	(Poland) Szymon Kielan (Poland) Yann Wójcik	6–7^{(10–12)}, 6–7^{(10–12)}
Win	2–1	Apr 2022	M15 Antalya, Turkey	World Tennis Tour	Clay	(Ukraine) Oleg Prihodko	(Czech Republic) Jiří Barnat (Czech Republic) Filip Duda	6–3, 6–3
Loss	2–2	Jun 2022	M15 Skopje, North Macedonia	World Tennis Tour	Clay	(Romania) Ștefan Paloși	(United States) Trey Hilderbrand (Romania) Bogdan Pavel	6–7^{(6–8)}, 2–6
Win	3–2	Jul 2022	M25+H Bacău, Romania	World Tennis Tour	Clay	(Chinese Taipei) Ray Ho	(Ukraine) Oleksandr Bielinskyi (United States) Nicholas Bybel	6–3, 6–4
Win	4–2	Aug 2022	M25 Pitești, Romania	World Tennis Tour	Clay	(Romania) Sebastian Gima	(Romania) Dragoș Nicolae Cazacu (Romania) Ioan Alexandru Chiriță	6–4, 6–3
Loss	4–3	Nov 2022	M15 Antalya, Turkey	World Tennis Tour	Clay	(Ukraine) Oleg Prihodko	(Romania) Mircea-Alexandru Jecan (Germany) Timo Stodder	4–6, 2–6
Win	5–3	Nov 2022	M25 Antalya, Turkey	World Tennis Tour	Clay	(Ukraine) Oleg Prihodko	(Romania) Mircea-Alexandru Jecan (Romania) Dan Alexandru Tomescu	6–3, 6–2
Loss	5–4	Nov 2022	M15 Antalya, Turkey	World Tennis Tour	Clay	(Ukraine) Oleg Prihodko	(Romania) Mircea-Alexandru Jecan (Romania) Cezar Crețu	4–6, 6–7^{(7–9)}
Loss	5–5	Jan 2023	M15 Manacor, Spain	World Tennis Tour	Hard	Svyatoslav Gulin	(Spain) Daniel Rincón (Paraguay) Daniel Vallejo	4–6, 6–7^{(5–7)}
Win	6–5	Jan 2023	M25 Antalya, Turkey	World Tennis Tour	Clay	Andrey Chepelev	(Turkey) Cengiz Aksu (Turkey) S Mert Özdemir	6–1, 7–5
Win	7–5	Oct 2023	M25 Telavi, Georgia	World Tennis Tour	Clay	(Ukraine) Viacheslav Bielinskyi	(Romania) Vlad Andrei Dumitru (Romania) Nicholas David Ionel	6–3, 6–0
Win	8–5	May 2024	M15 Bucharest, Romania	World Tennis Tour	Clay	(Bulgaria) Petr Nesterov	(Argentina) Tomas Lipovsek Puches (Argentina) Juan Bautista Otegui	6–7^{(5–7)}, 6–4, [10–7]
Win	9–5	May 2024	M15 Bucharest, Romania	World Tennis Tour	Clay	(Bulgaria) Petr Nesterov	(Italy) Simone Agostini (Italy) Matteo de Vicentis	7–6^{(7–4)}, 6–2
Loss	9–6	Jul 2024	M25 Bacau, Romania	World Tennis Tour	Clay	(Romania) Bogdan Pavel	(Uruguay) Franco Roncadelli (Brazil) Paulo André Saraiva dos Santos	4–6, 4–6

== Davis Cup ==
=== Participations: (9–3) ===
Group membership World Group (0–0) WG Play-off (0–0) Group I (0–0) Group II (0–0) Group III (4–3) Group IV (5–0)	Matches by surface Hard (0–0) Clay (9–3) Grass (0–0) Carpet (0–0)	Matches by type Singles (5–2) Doubles (4–1)

- ▲ ▼ indicates the outcome of the Davis Cup match followed by the score, date, place of event, the zonal classification and its phase, and the court surface.

Rubber outcome	No.	Rubber	Match type (partner if any)	Opponent nation	Opponent player(s)	Score
▲3–0; 22 June 2021; Tennis Club Jug-Skopje, Skopje, North Macedonia; Europe Zone Group IV Round Robin; Clay surface
Victory	1	I	Singles	Andorra	Damien Gelabert	6–1, 6–2
Victory	2	III	Doubles (with Alexander Cozbinov) (dead rubber)	Andorra	Èric Cervós Noguer / Damien Gelabert	6–1, 6–1
▲3–0; 24 June 2021; Tennis Club Jug-Skopje, Skopje, North Macedonia; Europe Zone Group IV Round Robin; Clay surface
Victory	3	I	Singles	Kosovo	Meldin Mustafi	6–0, 6–1
▲3–0; 25 June 2021; Tennis Club Jug-Skopje, Skopje, North Macedonia; Europe Zone Group IV Round Robin; Clay surface
Victory	4	I	Singles	San Marino	Stefano Galvani	6–2, 6–1
Victory	5	III	Doubles (with Alexander Cozbinov) (dead rubber)	San Marino	Marco De Rossi / Stefano Galvani	4–6, 6–3, 6–3
▲2–1; 22 June 2022; Tennis Club Bellevue, Ulcinj, Montenegro; Europe Zone Group III Pool B Round Robin; Clay surface
Victory	6	I	Singles	Montenegro	Petar Jovanović	6–4, 6–4
Victory	7	III	Doubles (with Alexander Cozbinov)	Montenegro	Rrezart Cungu / Petar Jovanović	3–6, 6–3, 6–2
▼1–2; 23 June 2022; Tennis Club Bellevue, Ulcinj, Montenegro; Europe Zone Group III Pool B Round Robin; Clay surface
Victory	8	I	Singles	Luxembourg	Chris Rodesch	7–5, 6–3
Defeat	9	III	Doubles (with Alexander Cozbinov)	Luxembourg	Alex Knaff / Chris Rodesch	1–6, 3–6
▲2–1; 24 June 2022; Tennis Club Bellevue, Ulcinj, Montenegro; Europe Zone Group III Pool B Round Robin; Clay surface
Defeat	10	I	Singles	North Macedonia	Kalin Ivanovski	4–6, 6–7^{(5–7)}
Victory	11	III	Doubles (with Alexander Cozbinov)	North Macedonia	Kalin Ivanovski / Gorazd Srbljak	6–4, 6–1
▼0–3; 25 June 2022; Tennis Club Bellevue, Ulcinj, Montenegro; Europe Zone Group III Promotional Play-off; Clay surface
Defeat	12	I	Singles	Cyprus	Menelaos Efstathiou	6–4, 1–6, 2–6
