= 2021 Davis Cup Europe Zone Group IV =

Davis Cup competition in 2021

The Europe Zone was the unique zone within Group 4 of the regional Davis Cup competition in 2021. The zone's competition was held in round robin format in Skopje, North Macedonia, from 22 to 26 June 2021.

== Participating nations ==
- Albania
- Andorra
- Armenia
- Azerbaijan
- Kosovo
- Moldova
- Montenegro
- North Macedonia
- San Marino

== Draw ==
Date: 22–26 June 2021

Location: Tennis Club Jug, Skopje, North Macedonia (clay)

Format: Round-robin basis. One pool of five teams and one pool of four teams. The top two in each pool will be promoted to Europe Group III in 2022.

=== Seeding ===
Pot	Nation	Rank^{1}	Seed
1	Montenegro	105	1
1	North Macedonia	111	2
2	Armenia	116	3
2	San Marino	121	4
3	Albania	126	5
3	Kosovo	127	6
4	Andorra	130	7
4	Moldova	133	8
4	Azerbaijan	134	9

- ^{1}Davis Cup Rankings as of 8 March 2021

=== Round Robin ===
==== Pool A ====
		MNE	ARM	AZE	ALB	RR; W–L	Set; W–L	Game; W–L	Standings
1	Montenegro		3–0	3–0	3–0	9–0	18–1 (95%)	112–32 (78%)	1
3	Armenia	0–3		2–1	2–1	4–5	9–11 (45%)	78–86 (48%)	2
9	Azerbaijan	0–3	1–2		2–1	3–6	7–12 (37%)	60–91 (40%)	3
5	Albania	0–3	1–2	1–2		2–7	4–14 (22%)	48–89 (35%)	4

==== Pool B ====
		MDA	MKD	SMR	AND	KOS	RR; W–L	Set; W–L	Game; W–L	Standings
8	Moldova		1–2	3–0	3–0	3–0	10–2	20–7 (74%)	132–68 (66%)	1
2	North Macedonia	2–1		1–2	3–0	3–0	9–3	21–6 (78%)	134–61 (69%)	2
4	San Marino	0–3	2–1		2–1	3–0	7–5	16–12 (57%)	125–103 (55%)	3
7	Andorra	0–3	0–3	1–2		3–0	4–8	8–17 (32%)	76–120 (39%)	4
6	Kosovo	0–3	0–3	0–3	0–3		0–12	1–24 (4%)	34–149 (19%)	5

Standings are determined by: 1. number of wins; 2. number of matches; 3. in two-team ties, head-to-head records; 4. in three-team ties, (a) percentage of sets won (head-to-head records if two teams remain tied), then (b) percentage of games won (head-to-head records if two teams remain tied), then (c) Davis Cup rankings.

- Montenegro, Armenia, Moldova and North Macedonia were promoted to 2022 Davis Cup Europe Zone Group III.

== Round Robin ==
=== Pool A ===
==== Montenegro vs. Albania ====
Montenegro
3
Tennis Club Jug, Skopje, North Macedonia
22 June 2021
Clay

Albania
0

			1	2	3
1	(Montenegro) (Albania)	Petar Jovanović; Elbi Mjeshtri	6; 3	6; 0
2	(Montenegro) (Albania)	Rrezart Cungu; Daniel Ostap	6; 1	6; 2
3	(Montenegro) (Albania)	Mario Aleksić / Matija Samardžić; Martin Muedini / Daniel Ostap	6; 0	6; 2

==== Armenia vs. Albania ====
Armenia
2
Tennis Club Jug, Skopje, North Macedonia
23 June 2021
Clay

Albania
1

			1	2	3
1	(Armenia) (Albania)	Sedrak Khachatryan; Arbër Sulstarova	6; 1	6; 1
2	(Armenia) (Albania)	Mikayel Avetisyan; Martin Muedini	6; 3	6; 2
3	(Armenia) (Albania)	Henrik Nikoghosyan / Nadir Sargsyan; Elbi Mjeshtri / Daniel Ostap	4; 6	0; 6

==== Montenegro vs. Azerbaijan ====
Montenegro
3
Tennis Club Jug, Skopje, North Macedonia
24 June 2021
Clay

Azerbaijan
0

			1	2	3
1	(Montenegro) (Azerbaijan)	Petar Jovanović; Elvin Hashimov	6; 1	6; 1
2	(Montenegro) (Azerbaijan)	Rrezart Cungu; Tamerlan Azizov	6; 1	6; 1
3	(Montenegro) (Azerbaijan)	Mario Aleksić / Matija Samardžić; Tamerlan Azizov / Elvin Hashimov	6; 1	6; 3

==== Armenia vs. Azerbaijan ====
Armenia
2
Tennis Club Jug, Skopje, North Macedonia
25 June 2021
Clay

Azerbaijan
1

			1	2	3
1	(Armenia) (Azerbaijan)	Sedrak Khachatryan; Elvin Hashimov	6; 3	6; 0
2	(Armenia) (Azerbaijan)	Mikayel Avetisyan; Tamerlan Azizov	5; 7	4; 6
3	(Armenia) (Azerbaijan)	Sedrak Khachatryan / Henrik Nikoghosyan; Tamerlan Azizov / Elvin Hashimov	6; 4	1; 6	6; 1

==== Montenegro vs. Armenia ====
Montenegro
3
Tennis Club Jug, Skopje, North Macedonia
26 June 2021
Clay

Armenia
0

			1	2	3
1	(Montenegro) (Armenia)	Petar Jovanović; Nadir Sargsyan	6; 0	6; 2
2	(Montenegro) (Armenia)	Rrezart Cungu; Mikayel Avetisyan	6; 1	6; 0
3	(Montenegro) (Armenia)	Mario Aleksić / Matija Samardžić; Mikayel Avetisyan / Henrik Nikoghosyan	3; 6	7^{7} 6^{5}	6; 1

==== Albania vs. Azerbaijan ====
Albania
1
Tennis Club Jug, Skopje, North Macedonia
26 June 2021
Clay

Azerbaijan
2

			1	2	3
1	(Albania) (Azerbaijan)	Elbi Mjeshtri; Elvin Hashimov	6; 1	3; 0		retired
2	(Albania) (Azerbaijan)	Daniel Ostap; Tamerlan Azizov	2; 6	1; 6
3	(Albania) (Azerbaijan)	Elbi Mjeshtri / Daniel Ostap; Tamerlan Azizov / Elvin Hashimov	3; 6	3; 6

=== Pool B ===
==== North Macedonia vs. Kosovo ====
North Macedonia
3
Tennis Club Jug, Skopje, North Macedonia
22 June 2021
Clay

Kosovo
0

			1	2	3
1	(North Macedonia) (Kosovo)	Kalin Ivanovski; Granit Bajraliu	6; 0	6; 0
2	(North Macedonia) (Kosovo)	Gorazd Srbljak; Fresk Sylhasi	6; 0	6; 1
3	(North Macedonia) (Kosovo)	Kalin Ivanovski / Stefan Micov; Meldin Mustafi / Muhamed Zulji	6; 1	6; 1

==== Andorra vs. Moldova ====
Andorra
0
Tennis Club Jug, Skopje, North Macedonia
22 June 2021
Clay

Moldova
3

			1	2	3
1	(Andorra) (Moldova)	Damien Gelabert; Ilya Snițari	1; 6	2; 6
2	(Andorra) (Moldova)	Èric Cervós Noguer; Alexander Cozbinov	0; 6	0; 6
3	(Andorra) (Moldova)	Èric Cervós Noguer / Damien Gelabert; Alexander Cozbinov / Ilya Snițari	1; 6	1; 6

==== North Macedonia vs. Andorra ====
North Macedonia
3
Tennis Club Jug, Skopje, North Macedonia
23 June 2021
Clay

Andorra
0

			1	2	3
1	(North Macedonia) (Andorra)	Kalin Ivanovski; Damien Gelabert	6; 2	6; 2
2	(North Macedonia) (Andorra)	Gorazd Srbljak; Èric Cervós Noguer	6; 0	6; 1
3	(North Macedonia) (Andorra)	Obrad Markovski / Stefan Micov; Damien Gelabert / Jordi Trilla Clanchet	6; 1	6; 1

==== San Marino vs. Kosovo ====
San Marino
3
Tennis Club Jug, Skopje, North Macedonia
23 June 2021
Clay

Kosovo
0

			1	2	3
1	(San Marino) (Kosovo)	Stefano Galvani; Granit Bajraliu	6; 2	6; 0
2	(San Marino) (Kosovo)	Marco De Rossi; Meldin Mustafi	6; 1	6; 0
3	(San Marino) (Kosovo)	Marco De Rossi / Stefano Galvani; Fresk Sylhasi / Muhamed Zulji	6; 2	6; 1

==== North Macedonia vs. San Marino ====
North Macedonia
1
Tennis Club Jug, Skopje, North Macedonia
24 June 2021
Clay

San Marino
2

			1	2	3
1	(North Macedonia) (San Marino)	Kalin Ivanovski; Stefano Galvani	6; 3	6; 3
2	(North Macedonia) (San Marino)	Gorazd Srbljak; Marco De Rossi	1; 6	6; 3	1; 6
3	(North Macedonia) (San Marino)	Kalin Ivanovski / Stefan Micov; Marco De Rossi / Stefano Galvani	6; 1	3; 6	2; 6

==== Kosovo vs. Moldova ====
Kosovo
0
Tennis Club Jug, Skopje, North Macedonia
24 June 2021
Clay

Moldova
3

			1	2	3
1	(Kosovo) (Moldova)	Meldin Mustafi; Ilya Snițari	0; 6	1; 6
2	(Kosovo) (Moldova)	Fresk Sylhasi; Alexander Cozbinov	0; 6	1; 6
3	(Kosovo) (Moldova)	Granit Bajraliu / Fresk Sylhasi; Maxim Cazac / Alexander Cozbinov	0; 6	3; 6

==== San Marino vs. Moldova ====
San Marino
0
Tennis Club Jug, Skopje, North Macedonia
25 June 2021
Clay

Moldova
3

			1	2	3
1	(San Marino) (Moldova)	Stefano Galvani; Ilya Snițari	2; 6	1; 6
2	(San Marino) (Moldova)	Marco De Rossi; Alexander Cozbinov	3; 6	6; 3	3; 6
3	(San Marino) (Moldova)	Marco De Rossi / Stefano Galvani; Alexander Cozbinov / Ilya Snițari	6; 4	3; 6	3; 6

==== Kosovo vs. Andorra ====
Kosovo
0
Tennis Club Jug, Skopje, North Macedonia
25 June 2021
Clay

Andorra
3

			1	2	3
1	(Kosovo) (Andorra)	Granit Bajraliu; Damien Gelabert	1; 6	4; 6
2	(Kosovo) (Andorra)	Fresk Sylhasi; Èric Cervós Noguer	1; 6	1; 6
3	(Kosovo) (Andorra)	Granit Bajraliu / Meldin Mustafi; Èric Cervós Noguer / Jordi Trilla Clanchet	6; 4	2; 6	5; 7

==== North Macedonia vs. Moldova ====
North Macedonia
2
Tennis Club Jug, Skopje, North Macedonia
26 June 2021
Clay

Moldova
1

			1	2	3
1	(North Macedonia) (Moldova)	Kalin Ivanovski; Andrei Gorban	6; 1	6; 1
2	(North Macedonia) (Moldova)	Gorazd Srbljak; Maxim Cazac	6; 1	6; 0
3	(North Macedonia) (Moldova)	Obrad Markovski / Stefan Micov; Maxim Cazac / Andrei Gorban	6; 2	1; 3		retired

==== San Marino vs. Andorra ====
San Marino
2
Tennis Club Jug, Skopje, North Macedonia
26 June 2021
Clay

Andorra
1

			1	2	3
1	(San Marino) (Andorra)	Simone De Luigi; Damien Gelabert	3; 6	1; 6
2	(San Marino) (Andorra)	Marco De Rossi; Èric Cervós Noguer	6; 4	6; 2
3	(San Marino) (Andorra)	Marco De Rossi / Stefano Galvani; Èric Cervós Noguer / Damien Gelabert	6; 4	6; 1
