= Alexandr Cozbinov =

Moldovan tennis player

- Country (sports): Moldova
- Born: 28 April 1995 (age 30) Chișinău, Moldova
- Height: 1.88 m (6 ft 2 in)
- Retired: Mar 2024 (last match played)
- Plays: Right-handed (two-handed backhand)
- College: UNLV
- Prize money: $101,904

Singles
- Career record: 0–3 (at ATP Tour level, Grand Slam level, and in Davis Cup)
- Career titles: 0; 0 Challenger, 3 Futures
- Highest ranking: No. 420 (21 August 2023)

Doubles
- Career record: 1–2 (in ATP Tour level, Grand Slam level, and in Davis Cup)
- Career titles: 0; 1 Challenger, 12 Futures
- Highest ranking: No. 237 (8 August 2022)

Team competitions
- Davis Cup: 15–6
- Last updated on: 15 December 2025.

Alexandr Cozbinov (born 28 April 1995) is a Moldovan inactive tennis player. He has a career high ATP singles ranking of world No. 420 achieved on 21 August 2023. He also has a career high doubles ranking of No. 237 achieved on 8 August 2022.

Cozbinov played college tennis at the University of Nevada, Las Vegas between 2015 and 2018. He won the Mountain West Conference Tennis Player of the Year in 2018.

Cozbinov represents Moldova at the Davis Cup, where he has a W/L record of 15–6.

== Career ==
In January 2020, he participated at the ATP Cup as a member of the Moldovan team. Before his match against Belgian Steve Darcis the organisers played the wrong national anthem, they played the Romanian anthem instead of the Moldovan one.

== Future and Challenger finals ==
=== Singles: 4 (3–1) ===
Legend (singles) ATP Challenger Tour (0–0) ITF World Tennis Tour (3–1)	Titles by surface Hard (2–1) Clay (1–0) Grass (0–0) Carpet (0–0)

Result	W–L	Date	Tournament	Tier	Surface	Opponent	Score
Win	1–0	Jul 2019	M15 Pittsburgh, United States	World Tennis Tour	Clay	(Sweden) Simon Freund	2–6, 6–2, 6–1
Win	2–0	Sep 2022	M15 Cancún, Mexico	World Tennis Tour	Hard	(United States) Tristan McCormick	6–3, 6–1
Loss	2–1	Sep 2022	M15 Cancún, Mexico	World Tennis Tour	Hard	(Australia) Bernard Tomic	6–7^{(5–7)}, 3–6
Win	3–1	Jun 2023	M15 Monastir, Tunisia	World Tennis Tour	Hard	(France) Adrien Gobat	6–1, 6–4

=== Doubles 19 (13 titles, 6 runners-up) ===
Legend (doubles) ATP Challenger Tour (1–0) ITF Futures Tour (12–6)	Titles by surface Hard (11–6) Clay (2–0) Grass (0–0) Carpet (0–0)

Result	W–L	Date	Tournament	Tier	Surface	Partner	Opponents	Score
Loss	0–1	Jun 2018	United States F17, Tulsa	Futures	Hard	(United States) Trevor Allen Johnson	(Moldova) Alexandru Gozun (United States) Emil Reinberg	6–7^{(6–8)}, 3–6
Win	1–1	Sep 2018	United States F26, Fountain Valley	Futures	Hard	(France) Maxime Cressy	(United States) Alec Adamson (United States) Conor Berg	6–2, 6–2
Win	2–1	Jan 2019	United States M25, Los Angeles	World Tennis Tour	Hard	(United States) Maxime Cressy	(Ecuador) Emilio Gómez (Mexico) Luis Patiño	6–4, 6–2
Win	3–1	May 2019	Mexico M15, Cancún	World Tennis Tour	Hard	(United States) Austin Rapp	(United Kingdom) David Fox (United Kingdom) Isaac Stoute	6–2, 4–6, [10–1]
Win	4–1	Jun 2019	United States M25, Wichita	World Tennis Tour	Hard	(United States) Brandon Holt	(United States) Jacob Dunbar (United Kingdom) David Fox	7–6^{(7–5)}, 6–3
Loss	4–2	Jul 2019	United States M15, Norman	World Tennis Tour	Hard	(Venezuela) Ricardo Rodríguez	(United Kingdom) David Fox (United Kingdom) Mark Whitehouse	4–6, 6–3, [7–10]
Loss	4–3	Aug 2019	United States M25, Memphis	World Tennis Tour	Hard	(United States) Harrison Adams	(United States) Ian Dempster (United States) Korey Lovett	2–6, 1–6
Loss	4–4	Feb 2021	Russia M15, St. Petersburg	World Tennis Tour	Hard (i)	(Ukraine) Marat Deviatiarov	(Czech Republic) Andrew Paulson (Czech Republic) Patrik Rikl	6–4, 4–6, [8–10]
Win	5–4	Apr 2021	Russia M15, St. Petersburg	World Tennis Tour	Hard (i)	(Sweden) Simon Freund	(Japan) Naoki Tajima (Russia) Alexey Zakharov	6–4, 7–5
Win	6–4	Apr 2021	Russia M15, St. Petersburg	World Tennis Tour	Hard (i)	(Sweden) Simon Freund	(Japan) Naoki Tajima (Russia) Alexey Zakharov	7–6^{(7–5)}, 2–6, [10–6]
Win	7–4	May 2021	Israel M15, Jerusalem	World Tennis Tour	Hard	(Ukraine) Marat Deviatiarov	(United Kingdom) Julian Cash (United States) Felix Corwin	w/o
Win	8–4	May 2021	Finland M15, Kouvola	World Tennis Tour	Hard	(Italy) Francesco Vilardo	(Switzerland) Luca Castelnuovo (Switzerland) Yannik Steinegger	6–2, 6–3
Win	9–4	Jun 2021	North Macedonia M15, Skopje	World Tennis Tour	Clay	(Netherlands) Gijs Brouwer	(Tunisia) Aziz Ouakaa (France) Jean Thirouin	6–1, 6–2
Win	10–4	Jul 2021	Portugal M15, Idanha-a-Nova	World Tennis Tour	Hard	(Republic of Ireland) Simon Carr	(Brazil) Gilbert Klier Júnior (Brazil) João Lucas Reis da Silva	6–3, 2–6, [10–5]
Win	11–4	Sep 2021	Istanbul, Turkey	Challenger	Hard	(Moldova) Radu Albot	(Croatia) Antonio Šančić (New Zealand) Artem Sitak	4–6, 7–5, [11–9]
Win	12–4	Apr 2022	United States M15, Sunrise	World Tennis Tour	Clay	(South Africa) Ruan Roelofse	(Netherlands) Alec Deckers (Luxembourg) Alex Knaff	6–4, 6–4
Win	13–4	Jun 2022	United States M15, Rancho Santa Fe	World Tennis Tour	Hard	(Denmark) August Holmgren	(Ghana) Abraham Asaba (Australia) Mitchell Harper	6–4, 6–7^{(7–3)}, [21–19]
Loss	13–5	Aug 2022	Mexico M15, Cancun	World Tennis Tour	Hard	(Italy) Marco Brugnerotto	(Peru) Ignacio Buse (Peru) Jorge Brian Panta	2–6, 6–7^{(5–7)}
Loss	13–6	Apr 2023	Egypt M25, Sharm El Sheikh	World Tennis Tour	Hard	(Denmark) August Holmgren	(Uzbekistan) Sergey Fomin (Russia) Alibek Kachmazov	2–6, 3–6

== National participation ==
=== Davis Cup (10–5) ===
Group membership World Group (0–0) WG Play-off (0–0) Group I (0–0) Group II (0–0) Group III (4–5) Group IV (6–0)	Matches by surface Hard (1–1) Clay (9–4) Grass (0–0) Carpet (0–0)	Matches by type Singles (5–4) Doubles (5–1)

- ▲ ▼ indicates the outcome of the Davis Cup match followed by the score, date, place of event, the zonal classification and its phase, and the court surface.

Rubber outcome	No.	Rubber	Match type (partner if any)	Opponent nation	Opponent player(s)	Score
▲3–0; 2 March 2016; Tere Tennis Centre Tallinn, Estonia; Europe Zone Group III Round Robin; Hard (indoor) surface
Victory	1	I	Singles	San Marino	Pietro Grassi	6–0, 6–0
▼0–2; 5 March 2016; Tere Tennis Center, Tallinn, Estonia; Europe Zone Group III Promotional Play off; Hard (indoor) surface
Defeat	2	I	Singles	Estonia	Kenneth Raisma	2–6, 4–6
▲3–0; 22 June 2021; Tennis Club Jug-Skopje, Skopje, North Macedonia; Europe Zone Group IV Round Robin; Clay surface
Victory	3	II	Singles	Andorra	Èric Cervós Noguer	6–0, 6–0
Victory	4	III	Doubles (with Ilya Snitari) (dead rubber)	Andorra	Èric Cervós Noguer / Damien Gelabert	6–1, 6–1
▲3–0; 24 June 2021; Tennis Club Jug-Skopje, Skopje, North Macedonia; Europe Zone Group IV Round Robin; Clay surface
Victory	5	II	Singles	Kosovo	Fresk Sylhasi	6–0, 6–1
Victory	6	III	Doubles (with Maxim Cazac) (dead rubber)	Kosovo	Granit Bajraliu / Fresk Sylhasi	6–0, 6–3
▲3–0; 25 June 2021; Tennis Club Jug-Skopje, Skopje, North Macedonia; Europe Zone Group IV Round Robin; Clay surface
Victory	7	II	Singles	San Marino	Marco De Rossi	6–3, 3–6, 6–3
Victory	8	III	Doubles (with Ilya Snitari) (dead rubber)	San Marino	Marco De Rossi / Stefano Galvani	4–6, 6–3, 6–3
▲2–1; 22 June 2022; Tennis Club Bellevue, Ulcinj, Montenegro; Europe Zone Group III Round Robin; Clay surface
Defeat	9	II	Singles	Montenegro	Rrezart Cungu	6–4, 4–6, 2–6
Victory	10	III	Doubles (with Ilya Snitari)	Montenegro	Rrezart Cungu / Petar Jovanović	3–6, 6–3, 6–2
▼1–2; 23 June 2022; Tennis Club Bellevue, Ulcinj, Montenegro; Europe Zone Group III Round Robin; Clay surface
Defeat	11	II	Singles	Luxembourg	Alex Knaff	6–2, 6–7^{(5–7)}, 2–6
Defeat	12	III	Doubles (with Ilya Snitari)	Luxembourg	Alex Knaff / Chris Rodesch	1–6, 3–6
▲2–1; 24 June 2022; Tennis Club Bellevue, Ulcinj, Montenegro; Europe Zone Group III Round Robin; Clay surface
Victory	13	II	Singles	North Macedonia	Gorazd Srbljak	6–2, 6–4
Victory	14	III	Doubles (with Ilya Snitari)	North Macedonia	Kalin Ivanovski / Gorazd Srbljak	6–4, 6–1
▼0–3; 25 June 2022; Tennis Club Bellevue, Ulcinj, Montenegro; Europe Zone Group III Promotional playoff; Clay surface
Defeat	15	II	Singles	Cyprus	Petros Chrysochos	1–6, 2–6

=== ATP Cup (1–5) ===
Matches by surface
Hard (1–5)
Clay (0–0)
Grass (0–0)

Matches by type
Singles (0–3)
Doubles (1–2)

Rubber outcome	No.	Rubber	Match type (partner if any)	Opponent nation	Opponent player(s)	Score
▼1–8; 3–7 January 2020; Ken Rosewall Arena, Sydney, Australia; Group stage; Hard surface
Defeat	1	I	Singles	Belgium	Steve Darcis	4–6, 7–6^{(7–4)}, 5–7
Defeat	2	III	Doubles (with Radu Albot)	Belgium	Sander Gillé / Joran Vliegen	7–6^{(7–5)}, 6–7^{(4–7)}, [9–11]
Defeat	3	I	Singles	Bulgaria	Dimitar Kuzmanov	1–6, 5–7
Victory	4	III	Doubles (with Radu Albot)	Bulgaria	Grigor Dimitrov / Alexandar Lazarov	6–4, 7–6^{(7–4)}
Defeat	5	I	Singles	(United Kingdom) Great Britain	Cameron Norrie	2–6, 2–6
Defeat	6	III	Doubles (with Radu Albot)	(United Kingdom) Great Britain	Jamie Murray / Joe Salisbury	2–6, 3–6

Sporting positions
Preceded by (Sweden) Jakob Amilon	Mountain West Conference Player of the Year; 2017–18	Succeeded by (Czech Republic) Zdenek Derkas
