= Melios Efstathiou =

Cypriot tennis player (born 1999)

Menelaos Efstathiou Μενέλαος Ευσταθίου
- Country (sports): Cyprus
- Born: 2 March 1999 (age 27) Limassol, Cyprus
- Height: 1.83 m (6 ft 0 in)
- Plays: Right-handed (two handed-backhand)
- Prize money: US $50,679

Singles
- Career record: 3–6
- Career titles: 0
- Highest ranking: No. 542 (26 October 2026)
- Current ranking: No. 542 (26 October 2026)

Grand Slam singles results
- Australian Open Junior: QF (2017)
- Wimbledon Junior: 2R (2017)
- US Open Junior: 3R (2017)

Doubles
- Career record: 0–1
- Career titles: 0
- Highest ranking: No. 464 (10 November 2025)
- Current ranking: No. 723 (26 October 2026)

Grand Slam doubles results
- Australian Open Junior: 2R (2017)
- Wimbledon Junior: QF (2017)
- US Open Junior: 1R (2017)

Team competitions
- Davis Cup: 5–6
- Last updated on: 26 October 2026.

Melios Efstathiou
Medal record

Men's tennis

Representing Cyprus

Mediterranean Games
Bronze medal – third place	2026 Taranto	Doubles

Menelaos Efstathiou (Greek: Μενέλαος Ευσταθίου; born 2 March 1999) is a Cypriot tennis player. Efstathiou has a career high ATP singles ranking of No. 542 achieved on 26 October 2026 and a career high ATP doubles ranking of No. 464 achieved on 10 November 2025.

Efstathiou has represented Cyprus in the Davis Cup, where he has a W/L record of 5–6.

== Juniors ==
Efstathiou reached the quarterfinals of the 2017 Australian Open boys' singles championships.

Efstathiou has a career high ITF junior combined ranking of world No. 42 achieved on 27 March 2017.

.

== Davis Cup ==
=== Participations: (5–6) ===
Group membership World Group (0–0) WG play-off (0–0) Group I (0–0) Group II (0–2) Group III (1–3) Group IV (4–1)	Matches by surface Hard (0–2) Clay (5–4) Grass (0–0) Carpet (0–0)	Matches by type Singles (5–6) Doubles (0–0)

- ▲ ▼ indicates the outcome of the Davis Cup match followed by the score, date, place of event, the zonal classification and its phase, and the court surface.

Rubber outcome	No.	Rubber	Match type (partner if any)	Opponent nation	Opponent player(s)	Score
▼1–4; 3–5 February 2017; National Tennis Centre, Nicosia, Cyprus; Europe/Africa Zone Group II first round; hard surface
Defeat	1	II	Singles	Turkey	Marsel İlhan	7–5, 6–1, 4–6, 6–7^{(5–7)}, 4–6
▼1–4; 7–9 April 2017; National Tennis Centre, Nicosia, Cyprus; Europe/Africa Zone Group II relegation play-off; hard surface
Defeat	2	I	Singles	Tunisia	Malek Jaziri	2–6, 3–6, 5–7
▲3–0; 4 April 2018; Tennis Club Lokomotiv, Plovdiv, Bulgaria; Europe Zone Group III Pool B round robin; clay surface
Victory	3	II	Singles	Andorra	Èric Cervós Noguer	6–0, 6–0
▲2–1; 5 April 2018; Tennis Club Lokomotiv, Plovdiv, Bulgaria; Europe Zone Group III Pool B round robin; clay surface
Defeat	4	II	Singles	San Marino	Marco De Rossi	4–6, 5–7
▼1–2; 6 April 2018; Tennis Club Lokomotiv, Plovdiv, Bulgaria; Europe Zone Group III Pool B round robin; clay surface
Defeat	5	II	Singles	Monaco	Lucas Catarina	7–5, 1–6, 2–6
▼0–2; 7 April 2018; Tennis Club Lokomotiv, Plovdiv, Bulgaria; Europe Zone Group III 3rd-4th playoff; clay surface
Defeat	6	II	Singles	(North Macedonia) Macedonia	Dimitar Grabul	1–6, 7–5, 6–7^{(5–7)}
▲3–0; 15 July 2019; Centro Tennis Cassa di Risparmio, City of San Marino, San Marino; Europe Zone Group IV Pool A round robin; clay surface
Victory	7	I	Singles	Iceland	Birkir Gunnarsson	6–1, 6–2
▲3–0; 16 July 2019; Centro Tennis Cassa di Risparmio, City of San Marino, San Marino; Europe Zone Group IV Pool A round robin; clay surface
Victory	8	I	Singles	Armenia	Artur Soghoyan	6–1, 6–1
▲3–0; 18 July 2019; Centro Tennis Cassa di Risparmio, City of San Marino, San Marino; Europe Zone Group IV Pool A round robin; clay surface
Victory	9	I	Singles	Albania	Martin Muedini	6–0, 6–1
▲3–0; 19 July 2019; Centro Tennis Cassa di Risparmio, City of San Marino, San Marino; Europe Zone Group IV Pool A round robin; clay surface
Victory	10	I	Singles	Liechtenstein	Robin Forster	6–0, 6–1
▲2–1; 20 July 2019; Centro Tennis Cassa di Risparmio, City of San Marino, San Marino; Europe Zone Group IV promotional playoff; clay surface
Defeat	11	I	Singles	(Republic of Ireland) Ireland	Simon Carr	3–6, 1–6

== Games of the Small States of Europe ==
=== Doubles 2 (2 victory) ===
Outcome	No.	Date	Tournament	Surface	Partner	Opponent	Score
Victory	1.	2 June 2017	City of San Marino, San Marino	Clay	(Cyprus) Eleftherios Neos	(Monaco) Florent Diep (Monaco) Thomas Oger	5–7, 6–2, [10–5]
Victory	2.	1 June 2019	Budva, Montenegro	Clay	(Cyprus) Eleftherios Neos	(Monaco) Lucas Catarina (Monaco) Romain Arneodo	6–1, 7–5
