= 2012 Davis Cup =

2012 edition of the Davis Cup

Details
- Duration: 10 February – 18 November 2012
- Edition: 101st

Champion
- Winning nation: Czech Republic

The 2012 Davis Cup (also known as the 2012 Davis Cup by BNP Paribas for sponsorship purposes) was the 101st edition of the tournament between national teams in men's tennis. The Czech Republic won the championship, beating Spain in the final, 3–2.

Czech Republic is the only country except United States and Australia to hold both Davis Cup and Fed Cup at the same time. The Czechs did the same in 2012, and they have also won the Hopman Cup.

The draw took place on 21 September 2011 in Bangkok, Thailand.

Cambodia made its first appearance in the tournament.

== World Group ==
Participating Teams
Argentina	Austria	Canada	Croatia
Czech Republic	France	Germany	Italy
Japan	Kazakhstan	Russia	Serbia
Spain	Sweden	Switzerland	United States

Seeds:

1. Spain
2. Argentina
3. Serbia
4. France
5. Czech Republic
6. United States
7. Croatia
8. Russia

=== Draw ===
First round 10–12 February
Oviedo, Spain (indoor clay)
1	Spain	5
Kazakhstan	0
Wiener Neustadt, Austria (indoor hard)
8	Russia	2
Austria	3
Vancouver, Canada (indoor hard)
4	France	4
Canada	1
Fribourg, Switzerland (indoor clay)
6	United States	5
Switzerland	0
Ostrava, Czech Republic (indoor hard)
Italy	1
5	Czech Republic	4
Niš, Serbia (indoor hard)
Sweden	1
3	Serbia	4
Miki, Japan (indoor hard)
Japan	2
7	Croatia	3
Bamberg, Germany (indoor clay)
Germany	1
2	Argentina	4

Quarterfinals; 6–8 April
Oropesa del Mar, Spain (clay)
1	Spain	4
Austria	1
Roquebrune-Cap-Martin, France (clay)
4	France	2
6	United States	3
Prague, Czech Republic (indoor clay)
5	Czech Republic	4
3	Serbia	1
Buenos Aires, Argentina (clay)
7	Croatia	1
2	Argentina	4

Semifinals; 14–16 September
Gijón, Spain (clay)
1	Spain	3
6	United States	1
Buenos Aires, Argentina (clay)
5	Czech Republic	3
2	Argentina	2

Final; 16–18 November
Prague, Czech Republic (indoor hard)
1	Spain	2
5	Czech Republic	3

=== Final ===
Czech Republic
3
O_{2} Arena, Prague, Czech Republic
16–18 November 2012
Hard (i)

Spain
2

			1	2	3	4	5
1	(Czech Republic) (Spain)	Radek Štěpánek; David Ferrer	3; 6	4; 6	4; 6
2	(Czech Republic) (Spain)	Tomáš Berdych; Nicolás Almagro	6; 3	3; 6	6; 3	6^{5} 7^{7}	6; 3
3	(Czech Republic) (Spain)	Tomáš Berdych / Radek Štěpánek; Marcel Granollers / Marc López	3; 6	7; 5	7; 5	6; 3
4	(Czech Republic) (Spain)	Tomáš Berdych; David Ferrer	2; 6	3; 6	5; 7
5	(Czech Republic) (Spain)	Radek Štěpánek; Nicolás Almagro	6; 4	7^{7} 6^{0}	3; 6	6; 3

== World Group play-offs ==
Date: 14–16 September

The eight losing teams in the World Group first round ties and eight winners of the Zonal Group I final round ties will compete in the World Group play-offs for spots in the 2013 World Group.

Seeded teams

1. Kazakhstan
2. Germany
3. Israel
4. Sweden
5. Canada
6. Russia
7. Italy
8. Switzerland

Unseeded teams

- Australia
- Belgium
- Brazil
- Chile
- Japan
- Netherlands
- South Africa
- Uzbekistan

Home team	Score	Visiting team	Location	Venue	Door	Surface
Kazakhstan	3–1	Uzbekistan	Astana	National Tennis Centre	Indoor	Clay
Germany	3–2	Australia	Hamburg	Rothenbaum Stadium	Outdoor	Clay
Japan	2–3	Israel	Tokyo	Ariake Coliseum	Outdoor	Hard
Belgium	5–0	Sweden	Brussels	Royal Primerose Tennis Club	Outdoor	Clay
Canada	4–1	South Africa	Montreal	Uniprix Stadium	Outdoor	Hard
Brazil	5–0	Russia	São José do Rio Preto	Harmonia Tenis Clube	Outdoor	Clay
Italy	4–1	Chile	Naples	Tennis Club Napoli	Outdoor	Clay
Netherlands	2–3	Switzerland	Amsterdam	Westergasfabriek	Outdoor	Clay

- Canada, Germany, Italy, Kazakhstan and Switzerland will remain in the World Group in 2013.
- Belgium, Brazil and Israel are promoted to the World Group in 2013.
- Australia, Chile, Netherlands, South Africa, and Uzbekistan will remain in Zonal Group I in 2013.
- Japan, Russia and Sweden are relegated to Zonal Group I in 2013.

== Americas Zone ==
=== Group I ===
Seeds:

1. Chile
2. Brazil

Remaining Nations:

- Ecuador
- Colombia
- Uruguay
- Peru

==== Draw ====
Second Round Play-offs
Lima, Peru (clay)
Peru	1
Ecuador	4

First Round Play-offs
bye
Peru
Ecuador
bye

First Round
1	Chile
bye
Montevideo, Uruguay (clay)
Peru	1
Uruguay	3
Salinas, Ecuador (clay)
Ecuador	1
Colombia	4
bye
2	Brazil

Second Round
Montevideo, Uruguay (clay)
1	Chile	3
Uruguay	1
São José do Rio Preto, Brazil (clay)
Colombia	1
2	Brazil	4

- Peru relegated to Group II in 2013.
- Chile and Brazil advance to World Group Play-off.

=== Group II ===
Seeds:

1. Paraguay
2. Venezuela
3. Mexico
4. Dominican Republic

Remaining Nations:

- El Salvador
- Puerto Rico
- Barbados
- Bolivia

==== Draw ====
Play-offs
Ciudad Merliot, El Salvador (hard)
1	Paraguay	2
El Salvador	3
Humacao, Puerto Rico (hard)
Bolivia	1
Puerto Rico	3

First Round
Saint Michael, Barbados (hard)
1	Paraguay	2
Barbados	3
Mexico City, Mexico (clay)
3	Mexico	5
El Salvador	0
S. Domingo, Dominican Rep. (hard)
Bolivia	1
4	Dominican Republic	4
Caracas, Venezuela (hard)
Puerto Rico	0
2	Venezuela	5

Second Round
Mexico City, Mexico (clay)
Barbados	0
3	Mexico	5
Valencia, Venezuela (hard)
4	Dominican Republic	3
2	Venezuela	1

Third Round
Santiago de los Caballeros, Dominican Rep. (clay)
3	Mexico	2
4	Dominican Republic	3

- Paraguay and Bolivia relegated to Group III in 2013.
- Dominican Republic promoted to Group I in 2013.

=== Group III ===
- Aruba
- Bahamas
- Costa Rica
- Guatemala – promoted to Group II in 2013
- Haiti – promoted to Group II in 2013
- Honduras
- Jamaica
- Panama
- Trinidad and Tobago
- U.S. Virgin Islands

== Asia/Oceania Zone ==
=== Group I ===
Seeds:

1. India
2. Australia

Remaining Nations:

- China
- Chinese Taipei
- South Korea
- New Zealand
- Uzbekistan

==== Draw ====
Second round play-offs
Kaohsiung City, Taiwan (hard)
New Zealand	2
Chinese Taipei	3

First round play-offs
Chandigarh, India (hard)
1	India	5
New Zealand	0
Kaohsiung City, Taiwan (hard)
Chinese Taipei	2
China	3

First round
1	India
Bye
Tauranga, New Zealand (hard indoor)
New Zealand	2
Uzbekistan	3
Gimcheon, South Korea (hard indoor)
South Korea	4
Chinese Taipei	1
Geelong, Australia (grass)
China	0
2	Australia	5

Second round
Namangan, Uzbekistan (clay indoor)
1	India	2
Uzbekistan	3
Brisbane, Australia (hard)
South Korea	0
2	Australia	5

- New Zealand relegated to Group II in 2013.
- Uzbekistan and Australia advance to World Group play-offs.

=== Group II ===
Seeds:

1. Philippines
2. Thailand
3. Indonesia
4. Pakistan

Remaining Nations:

- Hong Kong
- Lebanon
- Pacific Oceania
- Sri Lanka

==== Draw ====
Play-offs
Jounieh, Lebanon (clay)
Pacific Oceania	1
Lebanon	4
Hong Kong (hard)
Hong Kong	2
Sri Lanka	3

First Round
Camarines Sur, Philippines (indoor hard)
1	Philippines	5
Pacific Oceania	0
Jounieh, Lebanon (clay)
4	Pakistan	3
Lebanon	2
Hong Kong (hard)
Hong Kong	2
3	Indonesia	3
Colombo, Sri Lanka (clay)
Sri Lanka	2
2	Thailand	3

Second Round
Manila, Philippines (indoor clay)
1	Philippines	5
4	Pakistan	0
Jakarta, Indonesia (hard)
3	Indonesia	3
2	Thailand	2

Third Round
Pekanbaru, Indonesia (hard)
1	Philippines	2
3	Indonesia	3

- Pacific Oceania and Hong Kong relegated to Group III in 2013.
- Indonesia promoted to Group I in 2013.

=== Group III ===
- Venue: Enghelab Sport Complex, Tehran, Iran (outdoor clay)
- Date: 25–29 April

Rank	Team
1	Syria
2	Kuwait
3	Malaysia
4	Iran
5	Vietnam
6	Oman
7	Bangladesh
8	Kyrgyzstan

- Syria and Kuwait promoted to Group II in 2013.
- Bangladesh and Kyrgyzstan relegated to Group IV in 2013.

=== Group IV ===
- Venue: Khalifa International Tennis and Squash Complex, Doha, Qatar (outdoor hard)
- Date: 16–21 April

Rank	Team
1	Cambodia
2	United Arab Emirates
3	Turkmenistan
4	Qatar
5	Saudi Arabia
6	Singapore
7	Jordan
8	Iraq
9	Myanmar
10	Bahrain

- Cambodia and United Arab Emirates promoted to Group III in 2013.

== Europe/Africa Zone ==
=== Group I ===
Seeds:

1. Israel
2. South Africa
3. Belgium
4. Romania

Remaining Nations:

- Denmark
- Finland
- Great Britain
- Netherlands
- Portugal
- Slovakia
- Slovenia

==== Draw ====
Seeds:

1. Israel
2. South Africa
3. Belgium
4. Romania

Remaining Nations:

- Denmark
- Finland
- Great Britain
- Netherlands
- Portugal
- Slovakia
- Slovenia

=== Draw ===
Second Round Play-offs
Slovak Republic
Portugal	1
Slovakia	3
Finland
Finland	1
Denmark	4

First Round Play-offs
bye
Portugal
bye
Slovakia
Cluj-Napoca, Romania (indoor)
Finland	2
4	Romania	3
Denmark
bye

First Round
1	Israel
bye
Portugal
bye
3	Belgium
bye
Great Britain
Great Britain	3
Slovakia	2
Netherlands
Finland	0
Netherlands	5
bye
4	Romania
Slovenia
Denmark	0
Slovenia	5
bye
2	South Africa

Second Round
Israel
1	Israel	3
Portugal	2
Great Britain
3	Belgium	4
Great Britain	1
Netherlands
Netherlands	5
4	Romania	0
South Africa
Slovenia	1
2	South Africa	4

- Portugal and Finland relegated to Group II in 2013.
- Israel, Belgium, Netherlands, and South Africa advance to World Group play-off.

=== Group II ===
Seeds:

1. Ukraine
2. Poland
3. Bosnia and Herzegovina
4. Hungary
5. Belarus
6. Latvia
7. Cyprus
8. Estonia

Remaining Nations:

- Egypt
- Ireland
- Luxembourg
- Madagascar
- Moldova
- Monaco
- Morocco
- Turkey

==== Draw ====
Play-offs
Morocco
Monaco	3
Morocco	2
Egypt
Ireland	3
Egypt	2
Turkey
Moldova	3
Turkey	2
Madagascar
Luxembourg	4
Madagascar	1

First round
Ukraine
1	Ukraine	5
Monaco	0
Cyprus
7	Cyprus	3
Morocco	2
Hungary
4	Hungary	3
Ireland	2
Egypt
6	Latvia	3
Egypt	2
Belarus
Moldova	1
5	Belarus	4
Turkey
Turkey	1
3	Bosnia and Herzegovina	3
Estonia
Luxembourg	0
8	Estonia	5
Poland
Madagascar	0
2	Poland	5

Second round
Ukraine
1	Ukraine	5
7	Cyprus	0
Hungary
4	Hungary	2
6	Latvia	3
Belarus
5	Belarus	4
3	Bosnia and Herzegovina	1
Poland
8	Estonia	1
2	Poland	4

Third round
Latvia
1	Ukraine	3
6	Latvia	2
Poland
5	Belarus	2
2	Poland	3

- Morocco, Egypt, Turkey, and Madagascar relegated to Group III in 2013.
- Ukraine and Poland promoted to Group I in 2013.

=== Group III Europe ===
- Venue: Bulgarian National Tennis Centre 'Carlsberg', Sofia, Bulgaria (outdoor clay)
- Date: 2–5 May

Rank	Team
1	Bulgaria
1	Lithuania
3	Greece
3	North Macedonia
5	Georgia
5	Norway
7	Andorra
7	Armenia
9	Malta
9	Montenegro
11	Albania
11	San Marino
13	Iceland

- Bulgaria and Lithuania were promoted to Europe/Africa Zone Group II in 2013.

=== Group III Africa ===
- Venue: Cite Nationale Sportive D'El, Tunis, Tunisia (outdoor clay)
- Date: 2–6 July

Rank	Team
1	Benin
1	Tunisia
3	Ivory Coast
3	Zimbabwe
5	Namibia
6	Kenya
7	Ghana
8	Algeria

- Benin and Tunisia were promoted to Europe/Africa Zone Group II in 2013.
