= 2000 Davis Cup =

International tennis tournament

Details
- Duration: 4 February – 10 December 2000
- Edition: 89th
- Teams: 135

Champion
- Winning nation: Spain

The 2000 Davis Cup (also known as the 2000 Davis Cup by NEC for sponsorship purposes) was the 89th edition of the Davis Cup, the most important tournament between national teams in men's tennis. 135 teams entered the competition, 16 in the World Group, 30 in the Americas Zone, 31 in the Asia/Oceania Zone, and 58 in the Europe/Africa Zone. Andorra, Lesotho, Mauritius and Namibia made their first appearances in the tournament.

Spain defeated Australia in the final, held at the Palau Sant Jordi in Barcelona, Spain, on 8–10 December, to win their first title.

== World Group ==
Participating teams
Australia	Austria	Belgium	Brazil
Czech Republic	France	Germany	Great Britain
Italy	Netherlands	Russia	Slovakia
Spain	Switzerland	United States	Zimbabwe

=== Draw ===
First round 4–6 February
Harare, Zimbabwe (indoor hard)
United States	3
Zimbabwe	2
Ostrava, Czech Republic (indoor clay)
Great Britain	1
Czech Republic	4
Murcia, Spain (clay)
Spain	4
Italy	1
Moscow, Russia (indoor carpet)
Russia	4
Belgium	1
Bratislava, Slovakia (indoor hard)
Austria	2
Slovakia	3
Florianópolis, Brazil (clay)
Brazil	4
France	1
Leipzig, Germany (indoor carpet)
Netherlands	1
Germany	4
Zürich, Switzerland (indoor carpet)
Switzerland	2
Australia	3

Quarterfinals; 7–9 April
Inglewood, CA, United States (indoor carpet)
United States	3
Czech Republic	2
Málaga, Spain (clay)
Spain	4
Russia	1
Rio de Janeiro, Brazil (clay)
Slovakia	2
Brazil	3
Adelaide, Australia (grass)
Germany	2
Australia	3

Semifinals; 21–23 July
Santander, Spain (clay)
United States	0
Spain	5
Brisbane, Australia (grass)
Brazil	0
Australia	5

Final; 8–10 December
Barcelona, Spain (indoor clay)
Spain	3
Australia	1

=== Final ===
Spain vs. Australia

Spain
3
Palau Sant Jordi, Barcelona, Spain
8–10 December 2000
Clay (indoors)

Australia
1

			1	2	3	4	5
1	(Spain) (Australia)	Albert Costa; Lleyton Hewitt	6; 3	1; 6	6; 2	4; 6	4; 6
2	(Spain) (Australia)	Juan Carlos Ferrero; Pat Rafter	6^{4} 7^{7}	7^{7} 6^{2}	6; 2	3; 1		retired
3	(Spain) (Australia)	Joan Balcells / Àlex Corretja; Sandon Stolle / Mark Woodforde	6; 4	6; 4	6; 4
4	(Spain) (Australia)	Juan Carlos Ferrero; Lleyton Hewitt	6; 2	7^{7} 6^{5}	4; 6	6; 4
5	(Spain) (Australia)	Albert Costa; Pat Rafter						not played

== World Group qualifying round ==
Date: 14–23 July

The eight losing teams in the World Group first round ties and eight winners of the Zonal Group I final round ties competed in the World Group qualifying round for spots in the 2001 World Group.

Home team	Score	Visiting team	Location	Venue	Door	Surface
France	5-0	Austria	Rennes	Le Liberté	Indoor	Carpet
Great Britain	2-3	Ecuador	Wimbledon	No. 1 Court, All England Lawn Tennis Club	Outdoor	Grass
Italy	1-4	Belgium	Venice	Green Garden Sporting Club	Outdoor	Clay
Morocco	w/o	Chile	—	—	—	—
Uzbekistan	1-4	Netherlands	Tashkent	N.B.U. Complex	Outdoor	Clay
Sweden	5-0	India	Båstad	Båstad Tennis Stadium	Outdoor	Clay
Switzerland	5-0	Belarus	St. Gallen	Kreuzbleichhalle	Outdoor	Carpet
Zimbabwe	2-3	Romania	Harare	Harare Sports Club	Indoor	Hard

- Belgium, France, Netherlands and Switzerland remain in the World Group in 2001.
- Ecuador, Morocco, Romania and Sweden are promoted to the World Group in 2001.
- Belarus, Chile, India and Uzbekistan remain in Zonal Group I in 2001.
- Austria, Great Britain, Italy and Zimbabwe are relegated to Zonal Group I in 2001.

== Americas Zone ==
=== Group I ===
Second Round Play-offs
Bogotá, Colombia (clay)
Argentina	4
Colombia	1

First Round Play-offs
Montreal, Canada (hard)
Argentina	1
Canada	4
Nassau, Bahamas (hard)
Bahamas	3
Colombia	2

First Round
Argentina
bye
Viña del Mar, Chile (clay)
Canada	1
Chile	4
Lima, Peru (clay)
Bahamas	1
Peru	4
Bogotá, Colombia (clay)
Colombia	0
Ecuador	5

Second Round
Santiago, Chile (indoor hard)
Argentina	0
Chile	2
Lima, Peru (clay)
Peru	2
Ecuador	3

- Colombia relegated to Group II in 2001.
- Chile and Ecuador advance to World Group qualifying round.

=== Group II ===
Relegation Play-offs
Montevideo, Uruguay (clay)
Uruguay	4
El Salvador	1
San Rafael de Escazú, Costa Rica (hard)
Cuba	2
Costa Rica	3

First Round
Caracas, Venezuela (hard)
Venezuela	5
Uruguay	0
San Salvador, El Salvador (clay)
El Salvador	0
Paraguay	5
Guatemala City, Guatemala (hard)
Guatemala	4
Cuba	1
San Rafael de Escazú, Costa Rica (hard)
Costa Rica	1
Mexico	4

Second Round
Caracas, Venezuela (hard)
Venezuela	5
Paraguay	0
Guatemala City, Guatemala (hard)
Guatemala	0
Mexico	5

Third Round
Mexico City, Mexico (hard)
Venezuela	0
Mexico	5

- El Salvador and Cuba relegated to Group III in 2001.
- Mexico promoted to Group I in 2001.

=== Group III ===
- Venue: Liguanea Club, Kingston, Jamaica
- Date: 22–26 March

Rank	Team
1	Netherlands Antilles
2	Dominican Republic
3	Puerto Rico
4	Jamaica
5	Bolivia
6	Trinidad and Tobago
7	Panama
8	Haiti

- Netherlands Antilles and Dominican Republic promoted to Group II in 2001.
- Panama and Haiti relegated to Group IV in 2001.

=== Group IV ===
- Venue: Club Hondureno Arabe, San Pedro Sula, Honduras
- Date: 13–19 March

	HON	BER	LCA	ATG	BAR	ISV	ECA	RR; W–L	Match; W–L	Set; W–L	Standings
Honduras		3–0	3–0	3–0	3–0	3–0	3–0	6–0	18–0 (100%)	35–5 (88%)	1
Bermuda	0–3		2–1	3–0	2–1	2–1	3–0	5–1	12–6 (67%)	25–15 (63%)	2
Saint Lucia	0–3	1–2		2–1	2–1	3–0	3–0	4–2	11–7 (61%)	23–14 (62%)	3
Antigua and Barbuda	0–3	0–3	1–2		3–0	1–2	3–0	2–4	8–10 (44%)	17–24 (41%)	4
Barbados	0–3	1–2	1–2	0–3		2–1	2–1	2–4	6–12 (33%)	17–28 (38%)	5
U.S. Virgin Islands	0–3	1–2	0–3	2–1	1–2		1–2	1–5	5–13 (28%)	18–28 (39%)	6
Eastern Caribbean	0–3	0–3	0–3	0–3	1–2	2–1		1–5	3–15 (17%)	10–31 (24%)	7

- Honduras and Bermuda promoted to Group III in 2001.

== Asia/Oceania Zone ==
=== Group I ===
Second Round Play-offs
Jounieh, Lebanon (indoor hard)
China	3
Lebanon	2

First Round Play-offs
Tianjin, China (indoor hard)
China	1
Thailand	4
Yokohama, Japan (indoor carpet)
Lebanon	1
Japan	4

First Round
Kunming, China (hard)
Uzbekistan	3
China	0
Timaru, New Zealand (hard)
New Zealand	4
Thailand	1
Lucknow, India (grass)
Lebanon	2
India	3
Kashima, Japan (indoor carpet)
South Korea	3
Japan	2

Second Round
Tashkent, Uzbekistan (indoor hard)
Uzbekistan	4
New Zealand	1
New Delhi, India (grass)
India	4
South Korea	1

- Lebanon relegated to Group II in 2001.
- Uzbekistan and India advance to World Group qualifying round.

=== Group II ===
Relegation Play-offs
Causeway Bay, Hong Kong (hard)
Hong Kong	3
Kazakhstan	2
Manila, Philippines (clay)
Iran	3
Philippines	2

First Round
Causeway Bay, Hong Kong (hard)
Pakistan	3
Hong Kong	2
Almaty, Kazakhstan (indoor hard)
Chinese Taipei	4
Kazakhstan	1
Kuala Lumpur, Malaysia (indoor hard)
Iran	2
Malaysia	3
Manila, Philippines (hard)
Indonesia	4
Philippines	1

Second Round
Taichung, Taiwan (clay)
Pakistan	2
Chinese Taipei	3
Kuala Lumpur, Malaysia (indoor hard)
Malaysia	0
Indonesia	5

Third Round
Jakarta, Indonesia (hard)
Chinese Taipei	1
Indonesia	4

- Kazakhstan and Philippines relegated to Group III in 2001.
- Indonesia promoted to Group I in 2001.

=== Group III ===
- Venue: National Tennis Centre, Colombo, Sri Lanka
- Date: 9–13 February

Rank	Team
1	Syria
2	Kuwait
3	Sri Lanka
4	Qatar
5	Tajikistan
6	Singapore
7	Bangladesh
8	Pacific Oceania

- Syria and Kuwait promoted to Group II in 2001.
- Bangladesh and Pacific Oceania relegated to Group IV in 2001.

=== Group IV ===
- Venue: Al Hussein Sports City, Amman, Jordan
- Date: 24–30 April

	KSA	BHR	OMA	JOR	UAE	FIJ	BRU	RR; W–L	Match; W–L	Set; W–L	Standings
Saudi Arabia		2–1	1–2	2–1	2–1	3–0	3–0	5–1	13–5 (72%)	30–12 (71%)	1
Bahrain	1–2		2–1	2–1	2–1	3–0	3–0	5–1	13–5 (72%)	27–13 (68%)	2
Oman	2–1	1–2		3–0	1–2	3–0	3–0	4–2	13–5 (72%)	28–13 (68%)	3
Jordan	1–2	1–2	0–3		2–1	2–1	2–1	3–3	8–10 (44%)	17–23 (43%)	4
United Arab Emirates	1–2	1–2	2–1	1–2		1–2	3–0	2–4	9–9 (50%)	20–18 (53%)	5
Fiji	0–3	0–3	0–3	1–2	2–1		3–0	2–4	6–12 (33%)	13–24 (35%)	6
Brunei	0–3	0–3	0–3	1–2	0–3	0–3		0–6	1–17 (6%)	2–34 (6%)	7

- Saudi Arabia and Bahrain promoted to Group III in 2001.

== Europe/Africa Zone ==
=== Group I ===
Second Round Play-offs
Helsinki, Finland (indoor carpet)
Finland	4
Hungary	1
Maia, Portugal (clay)
South Africa	2
Portugal	3

First Round Play-offs
bye
Finland
bye
Hungary
bye
South Africa
Portugal
bye

First Round
Sweden
bye
bye
Finland
Romania
bye
bye
Hungary
Belarus
bye
bye
South Africa
Kyiv, Ukraine (indoor carpet)
Portugal	1
Ukraine	4
bye
Morocco

Second Round
Helsinki, Finland (indoor hard)
Sweden	3
Finland	2
Bucharest, Romania (indoor carpet)
Romania	3
Hungary	2
Minsk, Belarus (indoor carpet)
Belarus	4
South Africa	1
Casablanca, Morocco (clay)
Ukraine	2
Morocco	3

- Hungary and South Africa relegated to Group II in 2001.
- Sweden, Romania, Belarus, and Morocco advance to World Group qualifying round.

=== Group II ===
Relegation Play-offs
Mondorf-les-Bains, Luxembourg (clay)
Latvia	1
Luxembourg	4
İzmir, Turkey (hard)
Turkey	4
Lithuania	1
Tallinn, Estonia (indoor carpet)
Egypt	0
Estonia	5
Sofia, Bulgaria (clay)
Bulgaria	2
Israel	3

First Round
Jūrmala, Latvia (indoor carpet)
Croatia	5
Latvia	0
Mondorf-les-Bains, Luxembourg (clay)
Luxembourg	2
Ireland	3
Istanbul, Turkey (hard)
Denmark	3
Turkey	2
Šiauliai, Lithuania (indoor carpet)
Ivory Coast	3
Lithuania	2
Cairo, Egypt (clay)
Egypt	2
Slovenia	3
Bytom, Poland (clay)
Estonia	1
Poland	4
Sofia, Bulgaria (clay)
Greece	3
Bulgaria	2
Oslo, Norway (clay)
Norway	3
Israel	2

Second Round
Dublin, Ireland (carpet)
Croatia	5
Ireland	0
Rungsted, Denmark (clay)
Denmark	2
Ivory Coast	3
Szczecin, Poland (clay)
Slovenia	3
Poland	2
Athens, Greece (clay)
Greece	4
Norway	1

Third Round
Rijeka, Croatia (indoor carpet)
Croatia	5
Ivory Coast	0
Athens, Greece (clay)
Slovenia	4
Greece	1

- Latvia, Lithuania, Egypt, and Bulgaria relegated to Group III in 2001.
- Croatia and Slovenia promoted to Group I in 2001.

=== Group III ===
==== Zone A ====
- Venue: Tennis Club de Tunis, Tunis, Tunisia
- Date: 24–28 May

Rank	Team
1	Yugoslavia
2	Monaco
3	Georgia
4	Bosnia and Herzegovina
5	Togo
6	Botswana
7	Tunisia
8	Malta

- Yugoslavia and Monaco promoted to Group II in 2001.
- Tunisia and Malta relegated to Group IV in 2001.

==== Zone B ====
- Venue: Association Culturelle et Sportive d'Ambohidahy, Antananarivo, Madagascar
- Date: 24–28 May

Rank	Team
1	Moldova
2	Armenia
3	Iceland
4	Macedonia
5	Nigeria
6	Madagascar
7	Benin
8	Senegal

- Moldova and Armenia promoted to Group II in 2001.
- Benin and Senegal relegated to Group IV in 2001.

=== Group IV – Zone A ===
- Venue: Lugogo Tennis Club, Kampala, Uganda
- Date: 19–23 January

Group A

	NAM	ZAM	SMR	ETH	RR; W–L	Match; W–L	Set; W–L	Standings
Namibia		2–1	2–1	3–0	3–0	7–2 (78%)	15–4 (79%)	1
Zambia	1–2		2–1	2–1	2–1	5–4 (56%)	10–9 (53%)	2
San Marino	1–2	1–2		2–1	1–2	4–5 (44%)	8–11 (42%)	3
Ethiopia	0–3	1–2	1–2		0–3	2–7 (22%)	5–14 (26%)	4

Group B

	KEN	CYP	UGA	LES	DJI	RR; W–L	Match; W–L	Set; W–L	Standings
Kenya		2–1	3–0	3–0	3–0	4–0	11–1 (92%)	21–4 (84%)	1
Cyprus	1–2		2–1	3–0	3–0	3–1	9–3 (75%)	19–6 (76%)	2
Uganda	0–3	1–2		2–1	3–0	2–2	6–6 (50%)	10–14 (42%)	3
Lesotho	0–3	0–3	1–2		3–0	1–3	4–8 (33%)	9–16 (36%)	4
Djibouti	0–3	0–3	0–3	0–3		0–4	0–12 (0%)	0–19 (0%)	5

- Namibia and Kenya promoted to Group III in 2001.

=== Group IV – Zone B ===
- Venue: Accra Sports Stadium, Accra, Ghana
- Date: 14–20 February

Rank	Team
1	Ghana
2	Mauritius
3	Andorra
4	Algeria
5	Cameroon
6	Azerbaijan
7	Liechtenstein
8	Sudan

- Ghana and Mauritius promoted to Group III in 2001.
