= Julian Bradley =

Julian Bradley may refer to:

- Julian Bradley (politician) (born 1981), American politician
- Julian Bradley (tennis) (born 1992), Irish tennis player
