= List of Kosovo Davis Cup team representatives =

This is a list of tennis players who have represented the Kosovo Davis Cup team in an official Davis Cup match. Kosovo have taken part in the competition since 2016.

== Players ==
This table is current through the end of the 2019 Davis Cup Europe Zone Group IV matches (July 20, 2019).

Player	W-L (Total)	W-L (Singles)	W-L (Doubles)	Ties	Debut	Years Played
Granit Bajraliu	4–18	3–11	1–7	14	2016	4
Hyda Banjska	0–6	0–5	0–1	6	2016	2
Burim Bytyqi	0–12	0–5	0–7	9	2017	3
Gurash Hasani	0–3	0–0	0–3	3	2016	1
Meldin Mustafi	0–4	0–0	0–4	4	2016	2
Genc Selita	1–6	0–5	1–1	5	2018	2
Muhamed Zulji	0–6	0–1	0–5	5	2018	2
