= Jordi Trilla Clanchet =

Andorran tennis player

- Country (sports): Andorra
- Born: 21 December 2004 (age 20)
- Plays: Right-handed

Team competitions
- Davis Cup: 1–1

Jordi Trilla Clanchet (born 21 December 2004) is an Andorran tennis player.

Trilla Clanchet debuted for the Andorra Davis Cup team as a 16-year old in 2021. One of the youngest ever Andorran Davis Cup players, he was brought into the team as part of the local federation's new focus of giving experience to youth players. He featured in the doubles rubbers of back to back ties against North Macedonia and Kosovo, winning the latter (partnering Èric Cervós Noguer).
