= Cyprus Davis Cup team =

National sports team

Cyprus
- Captain: Demetris Herodotou
- Nations Ranking: 63
- Colors: blue and white
- First year: 1985
- Years played: 41
- Ties played (W–L): 125 (70–55)
- Most total wins: Marcos Baghdatis (67–15)
- Most singles wins: Marcos Baghdatis (47–4)
- Most doubles wins: Marcos Baghdatis (20–11) / Eleftherios Neos (20–8)
- Best doubles team: Demetrios Leontis/Marcos Baghdatis (7–2)
- Most ties played: Demetrios Leontis (47)
- Most years played: Marcos Baghdatis (17)

The Cyprus Davis Cup team represents Cyprus in the Davis Cup tennis competition and are governed by the Cyprus Tennis Federation.

Cyprus currently competes in the World Group II.

== History ==
Cyprus competed in its first Davis Cup in 1985. They lost their first 10 ties before finally defeating the Congo. Due to incurring so many losses, Cyprus was relegated to the fourth and last zonal group in 1997. The team began to record regular wins when in the year 2000 a 14-year-old Marcos Baghdatis made his Davis Cup debut. In 2007, Cyprus returned to the Zonal Group II and recorded their best result in 2009 where they fell one match shy of being promoted to the Zonal Group I.

== Home Court ==
The first ever tie Cyprus competed in was held in Nicosia against Ireland. The team continued to play out of the Cyprus capital of Nicosia until 2010 when the team played in Spyros Kyprianou Athletic Centre located in Limassol (home of Marcos Baghdatis).

== Current team ==
Player information and rankings as of 20 June 2022

Squad representing Cyprus in the 2022 Davis Cup Europe Zone Group III
Player	Current singles ranking	Current doubles ranking	First year played	Ties played	Total W–L	Singles W–L	Doubles W–L
Petros Chrysochos	660	626	2013	29	29–13	24–9	5–4
Menelaos Efstathiou	1071	1424	2017	19	10–9	10–9	0–0
Stylianos Christodoulou	1381	N/A	2022	2	1–1	0–1	1–0
Sergis Kyratzis	N/A	1040	2010	18	11–10	1–8	10–2
Eleftherios Neos	N/A	1909	2017	16	11–5	0–1	11–4

== Recent performances ==
Here is the list of all match-ups since 1985, when Cyprus began playing Davis Cup.

=== 1980s ===
Year	Competition	Date	Location	Opponent	Score	Result
1985	European Zone, 1st Round	10–12 May	Nicosia (CYP)	Ireland	1–4	Loss
1986	European Zone, 1st Round	9–11 May	Haskovo (BUL)	Bulgaria	0–5	Loss
1987	European Zone, 1st Round	8–10 May	Helsinki (FIN)	Finland	0–5	Loss
1988	Europe Zone II, Quarterfinal	6–8 May	Cork (IRL)	Ireland	0–5	Loss
1989	Europe Zone II, 1st Round	7–9 Apr	Monte Carlo (MON)	Monaco	0–5	Loss

=== 1990s ===
Year	Competition	Date	Location	Opponent	Score	Result
1990	Europe Zone II, 1st Round	30 Mar – 1 Apr	Nicosia (CYP)	Bulgaria	0–5	Loss
1991	Europe Zone II, 1st Round	3–5 May	Nicosia (CYP)	Greece	0–5	Loss
1992	Euro/Africa Zone Group II, 1st Round	1–3 May	(TUR)	Turkey	W/O	Win
1992	Euro/Africa Zone Group II, Quarterfinal	17–19 Jul	Nicosia (CYP)	Morocco	0–5	Loss
1993	Euro/Africa Zone Group II, 1st Round	30 Apr – 2 May	Casablanca (MAR)	Morocco	0–5	Loss
1993	Euro/Africa Zone Group II, Relegation Playoff	16–18 Jul	Accra (GHA)	Ghana	0–5	Loss
1994	Euro/Africa Zone Group III, Round Robin	18 May	Bratislava (SVK)	Congo	3–0	Win
1994	Euro/Africa Zone Group III, Round Robin	19 May	Bratislava (SVK)	Lithuania	1–2	Loss
1994	Euro/Africa Zone Group III, Round Robin	20 May	Bratislava (SVK)	Tunisia	1–2	Loss
1994	Euro/Africa Zone Group III, First Round	21 May	Bratislava (SVK)	Sudan	3–0	Win
1994	Euro/Africa Zone Group III, 5th to 8th Playoff	22 May	Bratislava (SVK)	Turkey	1–2	Loss
1995	Euro/Africa Zone Group III, Round Robin	26 Apr	Brazzaville (CGO)	Congo	3–0	Win
1995	Euro/Africa Zone Group III, Round Robin	27 Apr	Brazzaville (CGO)	Ethiopia	3–0	Win
1995	Euro/Africa Zone Group III, Round Robin	28 Apr	Brazzaville (CGO)	Kenya	2–1	Win
1995	Euro/Africa Zone Group III, Round Robin	29 Apr	Brazzaville (CGO)	Malta	1–2	Loss
1996	Euro/Africa Zone Group III, Round Robin	8 Jan	Nairobi (KEN)	Zambia	3–0	Win
1996	Euro/Africa Zone Group III, Round Robin	9 Jan	Nairobi (KEN)	Moldova	1–2	Loss
1996	Euro/Africa Zone Group III, Round Robin	10 Jan	Nairobi (KEN)	Ireland	0–3	Loss
1996	Euro/Africa Zone Group III, Round Robin	12 Jan	Nairobi (KEN)	Cameroon	1–2	Loss
1996	Euro/Africa Zone Group III, Round Robin	13 Jan	Nairobi (KEN)	Estonia	0–3	Loss
1996	Euro/Africa Zone Group III, Round Robin	14 Jan	Nairobi (KEN)	Djibouti	3–0	Win
1997	Euro/Africa Zone Group IV, Round Robin	21 May	Nicosia (CYP)	Congo	3–0	Win
1997	Euro/Africa Zone Group IV, Round Robin	22 May	Nicosia (CYP)	Zambia	2–1	Win
1997	Euro/Africa Zone Group IV, Round Robin	23 May	Nicosia (CYP)	Azerbaijan	3–0	Win
1997	Euro/Africa Zone Group IV, Round Robin	24 May	Nicosia (CYP)	Benin	2–1	Win
1997	Euro/Africa Zone Group IV, Round Robin	25 May	Nicosia (CYP)	Tunisia	1–2	Loss
1998	Euro/Africa Zone Group III, Round Robin	21 Jan	Lomé (TOG)	Estonia	1–2	Loss
1998	Euro/Africa Zone Group III, Round Robin	22 Jan	Lomé (TOG)	Ghana	0–3	Loss
1998	Euro/Africa Zone Group III, Round Robin	23 Jan	Lomé (TOG)	Madagascar	2–1	Win
1998	Euro/Africa Zone Group III, Round Robin	24 Jan	Lomé (TOG)	Kenya	0–3	Loss
1998	Euro/Africa Zone Group III, Round Robin	25 Jan	Lomé (TOG)	Madagascar	0–3	Loss
1999	Euro/Africa Zone Group IV, Round Robin	18 May	Marsa (MLT)	Sudan	3–0	Win
1999	Euro/Africa Zone Group IV, Round Robin	19 May	Marsa (MLT)	Ethiopia	3–0	Win
1999	Euro/Africa Zone Group IV, Round Robin	20 May	Marsa (MLT)	Iceland	1–2	Loss
1999	Euro/Africa Zone Group IV, Round Robin	21 May	Marsa (MLT)	Malta	1–2	Loss

=== 2000s ===
Year	Competition	Date	Location	Opponent	Score	Result
2000	Euro/Africa Zone Group IV, Round Robin	19 Jan	Kampala (UGA)	Lesotho	3–0	Win
2000	Euro/Africa Zone Group IV, Round Robin	20 Jan	Kampala (UGA)	Kenya	1–2	Loss
2000	Euro/Africa Zone Group IV, Round Robin	22 Jan	Kampala (UGA)	Djibouti	3–0	Win
2000	Euro/Africa Zone Group IV, Round Robin	23 Jan	Kampala (UGA)	Uganda	2–1	Win
2001	Euro/Africa Zone Group IV, Round Robin	16 May	Nicosia (CYP)	Algeria	3–0	Win
2001	Euro/Africa Zone Group IV, Round Robin	17 May	Nicosia (CYP)	Benin	2–1	Win
2001	Euro/Africa Zone Group IV, Round Robin	18 May	Nicosia (CYP)	Lesotho	3–0	Win
2001	Euro/Africa Zone Group IV, Round Robin	19 May	Nicosia (CYP)	Rwanda	3–0	Win
2001	Euro/Africa Zone Group IV, Round Robin	20 May	Nicosia (CYP)	Sudan	3–0	Win
2002	Euro/Africa Zone Group III, Round Robin	8 May	Gdynia (POL)	Poland	0–3	Loss
2002	Euro/Africa Zone Group III, Round Robin	9 May	Gdynia (POL)	Tunisia	1–2	Loss
2002	Euro/Africa Zone Group III, Round Robin	10 May	Gdynia (POL)	Macedonia	2–1	Win
2002	Euro/Africa Zone Group III, Relegation Playoff	12 May	Gdynia (POL)	Mauritius	3–0	Win
2003	Euro/Africa Zone Group III, Round Robin	11 Jun	Jūrmala (LAT)	Turkey	3–0	Win
2003	Euro/Africa Zone Group III, Round Robin	12 Jun	Jūrmala (LAT)	Bosnia and Herzegovina	3–0	Win
2003	Euro/Africa Zone Group III, Round Robin	13 Jun	Jūrmala (LAT)	Georgia	1–2	Loss
2003	Euro/Africa Zone Group III, Promotion Playoff	14 Jun	Jūrmala (LAT)	Latvia	1–2	Loss
2003	Euro/Africa Zone Group III, 3rd to 4th Playoff	15 Jun	Jūrmala (LAT)	Azerbaijan	3–0	Win
2004	Euro/Africa Zone Group III, Round Robin	4 Feb	Kaunas (LTU)	Lithuania	1–2	Loss
2004	Euro/Africa Zone Group III, Round Robin	5 Feb	Kaunas (LTU)	Estonia	2–1	Win
2004	Euro/Africa Zone Group III, 5th to 7th Playoff	7 Feb	Kaunas (LTU)	Andorra	2–1	Win
2004	Euro/Africa Zone Group III, 5th to 6th Playoff	8 Feb	Kaunas (LTU)	Iceland	1–2	Loss
2005	Euro/Africa Zone Group III, Round Robin	13 Jul	Dublin (IRL)	Turkey	2–1	Win
2005	Euro/Africa Zone Group III, Round Robin	14 Jul	Dublin (IRL)	Tunisia	3–0	Win
2005	Euro/Africa Zone Group III, Round Robin	15 Jul	Dublin (IRL)	San Marino	3–0	Win
2005	Euro/Africa Zone Group III, 1st to 4th Playoff	16 Jul	Dublin (IRL)	Ireland	2–1	Win
2005	Euro/Africa Zone Group III, 1st to 2nd Playoff	17 Jul	Dublin (IRL)	Armenia	2–1	Win
2006	Euro/Africa Zone Group II, 1st Round	7–9 Apr	Plovdiv (BUL)	Bulgaria	2–3	Loss
2006	Euro/Africa Zone Group II, Relegation Playoff	21–23 Jul	Cairo (EGY)	Egypt	3–2	Win
2007	Euro/Africa Zone Group II, 1st Round	6–8 Apr	Nicosia (CYP)	Finland	2–3	Loss
2007	Euro/Africa Zone Group II, Relegation Playoff	20–22 Jul	Nicosia (CYP)	Bulgaria	4–1	Win
2008	Euro/Africa Zone Group II, 1st Round	11–13 Apr	Nicosia (CYP)	Slovenia	3–2	Win
2008	Euro/Africa Zone Group II, Quarterfinal	20–22 Jul	Porto (POR)	Portugal	2–3	Loss
2009	Euro/Africa Zone Group II, 1st Round	6–8 Apr	Nicosia (CYP)	Portugal	3–2	Win
2009	Euro/Africa Zone Group II, Quarterfinal	10–12 Jul	Nicosia (CYP)	Ireland	3–2	Win
2009	Euro/Africa Zone Group II, Semifinal	18–20 Sep	Salo (FIN)	Finland	2–3	Loss

=== 2010s ===
Year	Competition	Date	Location	Opponent	Score	Result
2010	Euro/Africa Zone Group II, First Round	5–7 Mar	Limassol (CYP)	Egypt	3–2	Win
2010	Euro/Africa Zone Group II, Quarterfinal	9–11 Jul	Oeiras (POR)	Portugal	0–5	Loss
2011	Euro/Africa Zone Group II, First Round	4–6 Mar	Nicosia (CYP)	Hungary	0–5	Loss
2011	Euro/Africa Zone Group II, Relegation Playoff	8–10 Jul	Sofia (BUL)	Bulgaria	3–2	Win
2012	Euro/Africa Zone Group II, First Round	10–12 Feb	Limassol (CYP)	Morocco	3–2	Win
2012	Euro/Africa Zone Group II, Quarterfinal	6–8 Apr	Dnipropetrovsk (UKR)	Ukraine	0–5	Loss
2013	Euro/Africa Zone Group II, First Round	1–3 Feb	Šiauliai (LTU)	Lithuania	1–4	Loss
2013	Euro/Africa Zone Group II, Relegation Play-off	5–7 Apr	Nicosia (CYP)	Benin	3–2	Win
2014	Euro/Africa Zone Group II, First Round	31 Jan–2 Feb	Copenhagen (DEN)	Denmark	1–4	Loss
2014	Euro/Africa Zone Group II, Relegation Play-off	4–6 Apr	Casablanca (MAR)	Morocco	1–4	Loss
2015	Euro/Africa Zone Group III Europe, Group A	15 Jul	San Marino (SMR)	San Marino	3–0	Win
2015	Euro/Africa Zone Group III Europe, Group A	17 Jul	San Marino (SMR)	Greece	2–1	Win
2015	Euro/Africa Zone Group III Europe, Promotion Play-off	18 Jul	San Marino (SMR)	Norway	0–2	Loss
2016	Euro/Africa Zone Group III Europe, Group C	2 Mar	Tallinn (EST)	Iceland	2–1	Win
2016	Euro/Africa Zone Group III Europe, Group C	3 Mar	Tallinn (EST)	Andorra	3–0	Win
2016	Euro/Africa Zone Group III Europe, Group C	4 Mar	Tallinn (EST)	Montenegro	3–0	Win
2016	Euro/Africa Zone Group III Europe, Promotion Play-off	5 Mar	Tallinn (EST)	Ireland	2–0	Win
2017	Euro/Africa Zone Group II, First Round	3–5 Feb	Nicosia (CYP)	Turkey	1–4	Loss
2017	Euro/Africa Zone Group II, Relegation Play-off	7–9 Apr	Kuala Lumpur (MYS)	Tunisia	1–4	Loss

== See also ==
- Davis Cup
- Cyprus Billie Jean King Cup team
