= Simon Carr (tennis) =

Irish tennis player

- Country (sports): Ireland
- Residence: Mullingar, Ireland
- Born: 7 November 1999 (age 25) Dublin, Ireland
- Height: 1.83 m (6 ft 0 in)
- Plays: Right-handed (two-handed backhand)
- Prize money: $68,643

Singles
- Career record: 1–5 (at ATP Tour level, Grand Slam level, and in Davis Cup)
- Career titles: 0
- Highest ranking: No. 512 (3 February 2020)

Doubles
- Career record: 1–2 (at ATP Tour level, Grand Slam level, and in Davis Cup)
- Career titles: 0
- Highest ranking: No. 507 (27 September 2021)

Team competitions
- Davis Cup: 12–6
- Last updated on: 13 January 2025.

Simon Carr (born 7 November 1999) is an Irish former professional tennis player. He had a career high ATP singles ranking of No. 512 achieved on 3 February 2020, and best doubles ranking of No. 507 achieved on 27 September 2021.

== Early life and education ==
Simon Carr is the son of Tommy. He also played Gaelic football and rugby and swam when young but his mother got him into tennis at the age of nine and his grandfather is Seán Purcell. He studied in Mullingar C.B.S.

== Career ==
Carr represented Ireland at the Davis Cup, where he had a W/L record of 12–8. He received his first call-up to play against Denmark in February 2018. Carr announced his retirement from professional tennis in May 2024.

== Finals ==
=== ATP Challengers and ITF Futures ===
==== Singles: 3 (1 title, 2 runner-up) ====
| Legend (doubles) ATP Challenger Tour (0–0) ITF Futures Tour (0–0) $25,000 tournaments (0–1) $15,000 tournaments (1–1) | Titles by surface Hard (0–1) Clay (1–1) Grass (0–0) Carpet (0–0) |

| Result | W–L | Date | Level | Tournament | Surface | Opponent | Score |
|---|---|---|---|---|---|---|---|
| Winner | 1–0 | Apr 2019 | $15,000 | Tabarka, Tunisia | Clay | (Sweden) Christian Lindell | 6–1, 6–3 |
| Runner-up | 1–1 | May 2019 | $15,000 | Kampala, Uganda | Clay | (Russia) Ivan Nedelko | 2–6, 4–6 |
| Runner-up | 1–2 | Jul 2021 | $25,000 | Idanha-a-Nova, Portugal | Hard | (Spain) Alejandro Moro Cañas | 6–7^{(5–7)}, 4–6 |

==== Doubles: 10 (3 titles, 7 runner-ups) ====
| Legend (doubles) ATP Challenger Tour (0–0) ITF Futures Tour (0–1) $25,000 tournaments (1–1) $15,000 tournaments (2–5) | Titles by surface Hard (3–3) Clay (0–3) Grass (0–0) Carpet (0–1) |

| Result | W–L | Date | Level | Tournament | Surface | Partner | Opponents | Score |
|---|---|---|---|---|---|---|---|---|
| Runner-up | 0–1 | Jul 2015 | Futures | Dublin, Ireland | Carpet | (Republic of Ireland) Bjorn Thomson | (Republic of Ireland) Sam Barry (Republic of Ireland) David O'Hare | 3–6, 6–2, [3–10] |
| Runner-up | 0–2 | Apr 2019 | $15,000 | Tabarka, Tunisia | Clay | (France) Amaury Delmas | (Sweden) Filip Bergevi (Sweden) Markus Eriksson | 3–6, 1–6 |
| Runner-up | 0–3 | May 2019 | $15,000 | Kampala, Uganda | Clay | (United Kingdom) Ryan James Storrie | (India) Anirudh Chandrasekar (India) Niki Kaliyanda Poonacha | 3–6, 4–6 |
| Winner | 1–3 | Dec 2019 | $15,000 | Heraklion, Greece | Hard | (Netherlands) Ryan Nijboer | (Spain) Pablo Vivero Gonzalez (Argentina) Matias Zukas | 7–6^{(8–6)}, 6–3 |
| Winner | 2–3 | Feb 2020 | $15,000 | Cancún, Mexico | Hard | (New Zealand) Ajeet Rai | (France) Gabriel Petit (Australia) Brandon Walkin | 6–4, 6–2 |
| Runner-up | 2–4 | Mar 2020 | $25,000 | Potchefstroom, South Africa | Hard | (France) Corentin Denolly | (France) Benjamin Bonzi (France) Matteo Martineau | 4–6, 2–6 |
| Runner-up | 2–5 | Mar 2021 | $15,000 | Monastir, Tunisia | Hard | (United States) Alexander Kotzen | (Japan) Naoki Nakagawa (Japan) Ryota Tanuma | 1–6, 3–6 |
| Runner-up | 2–6 | Mar 2021 | $15,000 | Pune, India | Hard | (United States) Alexander Kotzen | (Switzerland) Luca Castelnuovo (India) Arjun Kadhe | 4–6, 5–7 |
| Runner-up | 2–7 | May 2021 | $15,000 | Cairo, India | Clay | (Germany) Kai Wehnelt | (Spain) Carlos Sánchez Jover (Spain) Jose Francisco Vidal Azorín | 5–7, 3–6 |
| Winner | 3–7 | Jul 2021 | $25,000 | Idanha-a-Nova, Portugal | Hard | (Moldova) Alexander Cozbinov | (Brazil) Gilbert Klier Junior (Brazil) João Lucas Reis da Silva | 6–2, 2–6, [10–5] |
