= Julian Bradley (tennis) =

Irish tennis player

- Country (sports): Ireland
- Residence: Atlanta, United States
- Born: 16 July 1992 (age 33) Dublin, Ireland
- Height: 1.98 m (6 ft 6 in)
- Plays: Right-handed
- College: North Florida
- Prize money: $26,187

Singles
- Career record: 0–0 (at ATP Tour level, Grand Slam level, and in Davis Cup)
- Career titles: 0 ITF
- Highest ranking: No. 869 (2 March 2020)

Doubles
- Career record: 2–0 (at ATP Tour level, Grand Slam level, and in Davis Cup)
- Career titles: 8 ITF
- Highest ranking: No. 319 (7 October 2019)

Team competitions
- Davis Cup: 4–1

Julian Bradley (born 16 July 1992) is an Irish tennis player.

Bradley has a career high ATP singles ranking of No. 869 achieved on 2 March 2020 and a career high ATP doubles ranking of 319 achieved on 7 October 2019.

Bradley represents Ireland at the Davis Cup, where he has a W/L record of 4–1.

Bradley played college tennis at the University of North Florida.

== Future and Challenger finals ==
=== Doubles 16 (8–8) ===
Legend (doubles) ATP Challenger Tour (0–0) ITF Futures Tour (8–8)	Titles by surface Hard (5–4) Clay (2–4) Grass (0–0) Carpet (1–0)

Result	W–L	Date	Tournament	Tier	Surface	Partner	Opponents	Score
Loss	0–1	Feb 2017	United States F6, Palm Coast	Futures	Clay	(United States) Isaiah Strode	(Argentina) Facundo Argüello (Argentina) Juan Ignacio Londero	2–6, 3–6
Loss	0–2	Sep 2017	Serbia F5, Novi Sad	Futures	Clay	(United States) Nathan Pasha	(Croatia) Domagoj Bilješko (Croatia) Ivan Sabanov	6–0, 2–6, [3–10]
Win	1–2	Jun 2018	Canada F4, Kelowna	Futures	Hard	(United States) Thai-Son Kwiatkowski	(United States) Charlie Emhardt (United States) Samuel Shropshire	7–6^{(7–5)}, 7–5
Loss	1–3	Nov 2018	United States F30, Niceville	Futures	Clay	(United States) Justin Butsch	(United States) Trevor Allen Johnson (United States) Patrick Kawka	6–7^{(5–7)}, 4–6
Loss	1–4	Nov 2018	United States F32, Pensacola	Futures	Clay	(Antigua and Barbuda) Jody Maginley	(Colombia) Felipe Mantilla (Dominican Republic) José Olivares	4–6, 4–6
Win	2–4	Jan 2019	M15 Naples, United States	World Tennis Tour	Clay	(United States) Strong Kirchheimer	(Chile) Gonzalo Lama (Chile) Alejandro Tabilo	6–4, 6–2
Loss	2–5	Feb 2019	M15 Tucson, United States	World Tennis Tour	Hard	(United States) Strong Kirchheimer	(United States) Martin Redlicki (Brazil) Karue Sell	4–6, 1–6
Win	3–5	Apr 2019	M15 Cancún, Mexico	World Tennis Tour	Hard	(United States) Henry Craig	(Ecuador) Iván Endara (Peru) Jorge Panta	6–3, 6–3
Loss	3–6	Apr 2019	M15 Cancún, Mexico	World Tennis Tour	Hard	(United States) Austin Rapp	(United Kingdom) Julian Cash (United States) George Goldhoff	3–6, 7–6^{(10–8)}, [6–10]
Win	4–6	May 2019	M15 Kampala, Uganda	World Tennis Tour	Clay	(Burundi) Guy Orly Iradukunda	(India) Anirudh Chandrasekar (India) Niki Kaliyanda Poonacha	6–4, 3–6, [10–6]
Loss	4–7	Jun 2019	M15 Acre, Israel	World Tennis Tour	Hard	(France) Florian Lakat	(Greece) Markos Kalovelonis (Greece) Michail Pervolarakis	7–6^{(11–9)}, 4–6, [6–10]
Win	5–7	Aug 2019	M25 Dublin, Ireland	World Tennis Tour	Carpet	(United Kingdom) Jack Findel-Hawkins	(United Kingdom) Ben Jones (United Kingdom) Joshua Paris	6–1, 7–6^{(7–5)}
Win	6–7	Aug 2019	M25 Chiswick, Great Britain	World Tennis Tour	Hard	(United Kingdom) Ben Jones	(Italy) Julian Ocleppo (Italy) Francesco Vilardo	2–6, 6–2, [10–5]
Win	7–7	Sep 2019	M15 Cancún, Mexico	World Tennis Tour	Hard	(United Kingdom) Jack Findel-Hawkins	(Colombia) Juan Sebastián Gómez (Peru) Jorge Panta	7–6^{(7–2)}, 7–5
Win	8–7	Sep 2019	M15 Cancún, Mexico	World Tennis Tour	Hard	(United Kingdom) Jack Findel-Hawkins	(Colombia) Juan Sebastián Gómez (Peru) Jorge Panta	6–3, 6–2
Loss	8–8	Nov 2019	M15 Cancún, Mexico	World Tennis Tour	Hard	(Australia) Cameron Green	(Peru) Arklon Huertas del Pino (Peru) Conner Huertas del Pino	4–6, 5–7
