= Kosovo Davis Cup team =

Kosovo
- Captain: Naim Shehu
- ITF ranking: 108 ▲20 (27 November 2023)
- First year: 2016
- Years played: 6
- Ties played (W–L): 24 (5–18)
- Best finish: Promotion for the (2024 Davis Cup Zone group III Europe/Africa)
- Most total wins: Granit Bajraliu (4–23)
- Most singles wins: Granit Bajraliu (3–14)
- Most doubles wins: Granit Bajraliu (1–9)
- Best doubles team: Granit Bajraliu & Genc Selita (1–1)
- Most ties played: Granit Bajraliu (18)
- Most years played: Granit Bajraliu (5)
- Last updated on: 6 December 2021.

The Kosovo Davis Cup team represents Kosovo in Davis Cup tennis competition and are governed by the Tennis Federation of Kosovo.

Kosovo currently compete in the Europe Zone Group IV.

They will take part in the Davis Cup for the first time in 2016, competing in the Europe Zone Group III.

== Current team (2022) ==
- Jasin Jakupi
- Mal Agushi
- Granit Bajraliu
- Fresk Sylhasi
- Vullnet Tashi

== History ==
On 28 March 2015, Tennis Europe granted membership to the Tennis Federation of Kosovo, which became effective in 2016. In December 2015, the Federation announced that it would compete at the 2016 Davis Cup in the Europe Zone Group III.

== Matches ==
Full list of Kosovo Davis Cup team matches (since independence):

No.	Year	Opponent	Final score
1	2016	Greece	0–3
2	2016	Estonia	0–3
3	2016	Liechtenstein	0–3
4	2017	Montenegro	0–3
5	2017	Ireland	0–3
6	2017	Andorra	0–3
7	2018	Malta	0–3
8	2018	Liechtenstein	0–3
9	2018	Moldova	1–2
10	2018	Armenia	0–3

No.	Year	Opponent	Final score
11	2019	Ireland	0–3
12	2019	San Marino	1–2
13	2019	Malta	0–3
14	2019	Andorra	2–1
15	2019	Armenia	0–3
16	2021	North Macedonia	0–3
17	2021	San Marino	0–3
18	2021	Moldova	0–3
19	2021	Andorra	0–3
20	2022	TBD	

Note: Kosovo scores first

== Statistics ==
Last updated: Kosovo - Andorra; 25 June 2021

Record

- Total: 1–18 (5.3%)

Head-to-head record (2016–)

DC team	Pld	W	L
Andorra	3	1	2
Armenia	2	0	2
Estonia	1	0	1
Greece	1	0	1
Ireland	2	0	2
Liechtenstein	2	0	2
Malta	2	0	2
Moldova	2	0	2
Montenegro	2	0	2
San Marino	2	0	2
Total (10)	19	1	18

Record against continents

Africa	Asia	Europe	North America	Oceania	South America
		Andorra; Armenia; Estonia; Greece; Ireland; Liechtenstein; Malta; Moldova; Montenegro; San Marino			
Record: 0-0	Record: 0-0	Record: 1-18 (5.3%)	Record: 0-0	Record: 0-0	Record: 0-0
Record by decade: 2016–2021: 1–18 (5.26%)

== See also ==
- Davis Cup
- Kosovo Billie Jean King Cup team
