= Marco De Rossi =

Sammarinese tennis player

- Country (sports): San Marino
- Born: 27 June 1997 (age 28) City of San Marino, San Marino
- Plays: Right-handed (two-handed backhand)
- Prize money: $16,881

Singles
- Career record: 16–13 (at ATP Tour level, Grand Slam level, and in Davis Cup)
- Career titles: 0
- Highest ranking: No. 1101 (26 September 2022)

Doubles
- Career record: 7–12 (at ATP Tour level, Grand Slam level, and in Davis Cup)
- Career titles: 0
- Highest ranking: No. 729 (14 August 2023)

Team competitions
- Davis Cup: 17–23
- Last updated on: 20 July 2019.

Marco De Rossi (born 27 June 1997) is a Sammarinese tennis player.

De Rossi has a career high ATP singles ranking of 1101 achieved on 26 September 2022.

De Rossi represents San Marino at the Davis Cup, where he has a W/L record of 17–23.

De Rossi was just 15 years old when he received a wildcard into the 2012 San Marino Open qualifying draw, where he won the first round of qualifying but was double-bageled in the next round. 9 years later, De Rossi made ATP Challenger Tour debut at the 2021 San Marino Open after receiving a wildcard into the singles and doubles main draw. He played the second seed and former world number 6 Gilles Simon in the first round but lost in straight sets.
