= Andorra Davis Cup team =

National tennis team

Andorra
- Captain: Laurent Recouderc
- ITF ranking: 106
- Colors: Red & White
- First year: 2000
- Years played: 15
- Ties played (W–L): 63 (26–37)
- Years in World Group: 0
- Davis Cup titles: 0
- Runners-up: 0
- Most total wins: Poux-Gautier (41)
- Most singles wins: Poux-Gautier (25)
- Most doubles wins: Poux-Gautier (16)
- Best doubles team: Poux-Gautier / Vila (6–1)
- Most ties played: Poux-Gautier (53)
- Most years played: Poux-Gautier (13)
- Last updated on: June 2017.

The Andorra Davis Cup team represents Andorra in Davis Cup tennis competition and are governed by the Federació Andorrana de Tennis.

Andorra currently competes in the Europe Zone of Group IV, and have done so since 2008. They reached Group II in 2003, losing to Greece in the first round 1-4 and to Egypt 2-3 in the relegation play-off.

Jean-Baptiste Poux-Gautier holds most if not all of Andorra's individual player records.

== History ==
Andorra competed in its first Davis Cup in 2000, beginning in Europe Group IV. For much of its history, the team has yo-yoed up and down group levels. They won promotion to Group 3 in 2001, and then promotion to Group 2 the following year.

In 2003 in Europe/Africa Group II, Andorra lost to Greece in their first round tie 1-4, in a tie played in April at the Poliesportiv d'Andorra on indoor carpet. In the opening rubber, Kenneth Tuilier-Curco was soundly beaten by Vasilis Mazarakis 1-6, 0-6, 1-6. In the next match, Andorra's second winningest player in its history, Joan Jimenez-Herrara, fared better but still bowed out in straight sets, to Konstantinos Economidis 4-6, 4-6, 3-6. Jimenez-Herrara and Pau Gerbaud-Farras fought back from two sets down in the doubles rubber but lost the fifth set to Mazarakis and Economidis 4-6. Marc Vilanova was credited with a consolation dead rubber match win in a walk over his opponent.

In July of the same year Andorra faced Egypt in a tie that saw the winner remain in Europe/Africa Group 2. Also played at the Poliesportiv d'Andorra, the home side went up 1-0 when Joan Jimenez-Herrara took the opening set over Mohamed Mamoun in four sets. Tuilier-Curco however could only manage to win a set as he fell to Egyptian No. 1 Karim Maamoun, 2-6, 0-6, 7-6(0), 1-6. Things started brightly for Andorra in the doubles rubber, as Jimenez-Herrara and Pau Gerbaud-Farras took the first set in the doubles rubber, 6–4. Egypt won the next three closely contested sets however, 6-7, 4-6, 4-6, to take a 2 match to 1 lead in the tie. The fourth rubber pitted the top singles players of both countries: Jimenez-Herrara twice took a one-set lead only to see Maamoun win the deciding set 8–6, sealing Egypt's victory and Andorra relegation to Group 3.

The following year Andorra was demoted to Group 4, but won promotion back to Group 3 in 2005. They went back down to Group 4 the following year, but stayed at that level just one year, yet again. Since 2008, however, the team has remained in Europe/Africa Group III.

Andorra did not compete from 2012 to 2015. It came back to the competition for the 2016 edition, where it finished in the 9th position of the European Group III.

== Current team (2022) ==
- Damien Gelabert
- Èric Cervós Noguer
- Jordi Trilla Clanchet (Junior player)
- Jean-Baptiste Poux-Gautier (Captain-player)

== All players ==
As of the end of the 2017 Davis Cup

Name	Debut	Tot	S	D	TP	YP
Gerard Blasi	2011	0–1	0–1		1	1
Èric Cervós Noguer	2016	2–5	0–3	2–2	7	2
Ernesto Díaz	2001	1–2		1–2	3	1
Gerard Florido	2012	0–2	0–1	0–1	2	1
Damien Gelabert	2011	1–4	0–2	1–2	3	1
Pau Gerbaud	2003	15–23	10–12	5–11	30	7
Héctor Hormigo	2006	1–19	0–10	1–9	18	6
Joan Jiménez	2000	17–14	12–8	5–6	20	5
Oscar Pons	2002	0–1		0–1	1	1
Jean-Baptiste Poux-Gautier	2000	41–34	25–20	16–14	53	13
Àlex Rabanal	2005	4–3		4–3	7	2
Laurent Recouderc	2016	6–8	4–3	2–5	8	2
Kenneth Tuilier	2000	9–13	5–8	4–5	18	5
Marc Vilanova	2003	0–1		0–1	2	2
Jordi Vila	2007	10–10	3–2	7–8	19	5

== See also ==
- Davis Cup
