= Armenia Davis Cup team =

National tennis team

Armenia
- Captain: Vahe Avetisyan
- Nations Ranking: 116 ▼
- First year: 1996
- Years played: 25
- Ties played (W–L): 102 (44–57)
- Best finish: Europe/Africa Zone Group II quarterfinal (2001)
- Most total wins: Harutyun Sofyan (36)
- Most singles wins: Sargis Sargsian (19)
- Most doubles wins: Harutyun Sofyan (21)
- Best doubles team: Harutyun Sofyan & Sargis Sargsian (7)
- Most ties played: Harutyun Sofyan (41)
- Most years played: Harutyun Sofyan (10)

The Armenia men's national tennis team represents Armenia in Davis Cup tennis competitions and are governed by the Armenian Tennis Federation.

Armenia currently competes in the fourth group of Europe zone. They reached the Group II quarterfinals in 2001.

== History ==
Prior to 1991, Armenian players had been represented by the Soviet Union. Armenia competed in its first Davis Cup in 1996.

== Current team (2022) ==
- Mikayel Avetisyan
- Sedrak Khachatryan
- Ashot Mkrtchyan
- Henrik Nikoghosyan
- Robert Yedigaryan

== See also ==
- Davis Cup
- Armenia Billie Jean King Cup team
