= San Marino Davis Cup team =

National tennis team

San Marino
- Captain: Domenico Vicini
- Nations Ranking: 119 ▼2
- First year: 1993
- Years played: 19
- Ties played (W–L): 88 (33–55)
- Most total wins: Domenico Vicini (57)
- Most singles wins: Domenico Vicini (44)
- Most doubles wins: Christian Rosti (14)
- Best doubles team: Domenico Vicini & Christian Rosti (6)
- Most ties played: Domenico Vicini (84)
- Most years played: Domenico Vicini (18)

The San Marino Davis Cup team represents San Marino in Davis Cup tennis competition and are governed by the San Marino Tennis Federation.

San Marino currently compete in the Group IV of Europe Zone and has never been promoted to the second group.

Sammarinese players hold numerous Davis Cup records, most notably: the all-time record for the number of Davis Cup rubbers played, at 141, held by Domenico Vicini; the record for the oldest player to ever play a Davis Cup rubber, at 66 years and 104 days, held by Vittorio Pellandra; and the record for the youngest player to play a Davis Cup rubber, at 13 years and 319 days, held by Marco De Rossi. The latter record cannot be broken under current rules, which only allow players aged 14 years or older to play.

== History ==
San Marino competed in its first Davis Cup in 1993.

== Current team (2022) ==
- Marco de Rossi
- Stefano Galvani
- Simone de Luigi (Junior player)
- Domenico Vicini (Captain-player)

== See also ==
- Davis Cup
- San Marino Billie Jean King Cup team
