= 2022 ITF Men's World Tennis Tour (July–September) =

The 2022 ITF Men's World Tennis Tour is the 2022 edition of the second-tier tour for men's professional tennis. It is organised by the International Tennis Federation and is a tier below the ATP Challenger Tour. The ITF Men's World Tennis Tour includes tournaments with prize money ranging from $15,000 to $25,000.

== Key ==
M25 tournaments
M15 tournaments

== Month ==
=== July ===
Week of	Tournament	Winner	Runners-up	Semifinalists	Quarterfinalists
July 4	Ajaccio, France; Hard; M25+H; Singles and Doubles Draws	(France) Sascha Gueymard Wayenburg; 6–4, 5–7, 6–4	(France) Dan Added	(France) Térence Atmane (France) Calvin Hemery	(France) Clément Chidekh (France) Nicolas Tepmahc (Zimbabwe) Benjamin Lock (France) César Bouchelaghem
July 4	Ajaccio, France; Hard; M25+H; Singles and Doubles Draws	(United Kingdom) Luke Johnson (United Kingdom) Ben Jones; 6–2, 6–7^{(1–7)}, [10–8]	(France) Dan Added (France) Arthur Bouquier	(France) Térence Atmane (France) Calvin Hemery	(France) Clément Chidekh (France) Nicolas Tepmahc (Zimbabwe) Benjamin Lock (France) César Bouchelaghem
July 4	Marburg, Germany; Clay; M25; Singles and Doubles Draws	(Belgium) Raphaël Collignon; 6–2, 6–2	(Israel) Yshai Oliel	(Argentina) Hernán Casanova (Germany) Milan Welte	(Australia) Tristan Schoolkate (Czech Republic) Michael Vrbenský (Poland) Filip Peliwo (Netherlands) Sidané Pontjodikromo
July 4	Marburg, Germany; Clay; M25; Singles and Doubles Draws	(Germany) Jannik Opitz (Germany) Maik Steiner; 7–6^{(7–4)}, 6–7^{(3–7)}, [12–10]	(Ukraine) Illya Beloborodko (Ukraine) Volodymyr Uzhylovskyi	(Argentina) Hernán Casanova (Germany) Milan Welte	(Australia) Tristan Schoolkate (Czech Republic) Michael Vrbenský (Poland) Filip Peliwo (Netherlands) Sidané Pontjodikromo
July 4	Casinalbo, Italy; Clay; M25; Singles and Doubles Draws	(France) Valentin Royer; 3–6, 6–3, 6–4	(Italy) Francesco Forti	(Uzbekistan) Khumoyun Sultanov (Tunisia) Moez Echargui	(France) Laurent Lokoli (Italy) Giovanni Oradini (Italy) Filippo Speziali (Italy) Gabriele Piraino
July 4	Casinalbo, Italy; Clay; M25; Singles and Doubles Draws	(Italy) Federico Arnaboldi (Italy) Gianmarco Ferrari; 2–6, 6–3, [10–6]	(Brazil) Gabriel Roveri Sidney (Netherlands) Mick Veldheer	(Uzbekistan) Khumoyun Sultanov (Tunisia) Moez Echargui	(France) Laurent Lokoli (Italy) Giovanni Oradini (Italy) Filippo Speziali (Italy) Gabriele Piraino
July 4	Getxo, Spain; Clay (indoor); M25; Singles and Doubles Draws	(Spain) Álvaro López San Martín; 6–4, 2–6, 6–4	(Spain) Àlex Martí Pujolràs	(France) Giovanni Mpetshi Perricard (Argentina) Julio César Porras	(Spain) Àlex Martínez (Spain) Carlos López Montagud (Spain) Iñaki Montes de la Torre (Spain) Carlos Sánchez Jover
July 4	Getxo, Spain; Clay (indoor); M25; Singles and Doubles Draws	(Spain) Carlos López Montagud (Netherlands) Ryan Nijboer; 6–4, 6–4	(Spain) Alberto Barroso Campos (Spain) Carlos Sánchez Jover	(France) Giovanni Mpetshi Perricard (Argentina) Julio César Porras	(Spain) Àlex Martínez (Spain) Carlos López Montagud (Spain) Iñaki Montes de la Torre (Spain) Carlos Sánchez Jover
July 4	Sofia, Bulgaria; Clay; M15; Singles and Doubles Draws	(Bulgaria) Alexandar Lazarov; 6–1, 6–2	(Romania) Vlad Andrei Dancu	(France) Lucas Bouquet (Bulgaria) Simon Anthony Ivanov	(Argentina) Juan Ignacio Galarza (Denmark) Elmer Møller (Slovenia) Tomás Lipovšek Puches (Bulgaria) Leonid Sheyngezikht
July 4	Sofia, Bulgaria; Clay; M15; Singles and Doubles Draws	(Bulgaria) Gabriel Donev (Bulgaria) Simon Anthony Ivanov; 3–6, 7–5, [11–9]	(Argentina) Juan Ignacio Galarza (Slovenia) Tomás Lipovšek Puches	(France) Lucas Bouquet (Bulgaria) Simon Anthony Ivanov	(Argentina) Juan Ignacio Galarza (Denmark) Elmer Møller (Slovenia) Tomás Lipovšek Puches (Bulgaria) Leonid Sheyngezikht
July 4	Casablanca, Morocco; Clay; M15; Singles and Doubles Draws	(France) Mathys Erhard; 6–4, 6–2	(Switzerland) Mirko Martinez	(Spain) Jorge Martínez Martínez (France) Pierre Delage	(Italy) Federico Iannaccone (Italy) Gian Marco Ortenzi (Belgium) Simon Beaupain (Morocco) Reda Bennani
July 4	Casablanca, Morocco; Clay; M15; Singles and Doubles Draws	(Morocco) Younes Lalami Laaroussi (Morocco) Adam Moundir; 3–6, 6–3, [11–9]	(Belgium) Simon Beaupain (Italy) Federico Iannaccone	(Spain) Jorge Martínez Martínez (France) Pierre Delage	(Italy) Federico Iannaccone (Italy) Gian Marco Ortenzi (Belgium) Simon Beaupain (Morocco) Reda Bennani
July 4	Velenje, Slovenia; Clay; M15; Singles and Doubles Draws	(Lithuania) Vilius Gaubas; 6–3, 6–4	(Croatia) Duje Kekez	(Slovenia) Filip Jeff Planinšek (Czech Republic) Jiří Barnat	(Slovakia) Lukáš Pokorný (Bosnia and Herzegovina) Nemanja Malešević (Czech Republic) Filip Duda (Croatia) Domagoj Bilješko
July 4	Velenje, Slovenia; Clay; M15; Singles and Doubles Draws	(France) Constantin Bittoun Kouzmine (Australia) Brandon Walkin; 6–1, 6–2	(Czech Republic) Jiří Barnat (Czech Republic) Filip Duda	(Slovenia) Filip Jeff Planinšek (Czech Republic) Jiří Barnat	(Slovakia) Lukáš Pokorný (Bosnia and Herzegovina) Nemanja Malešević (Czech Republic) Filip Duda (Croatia) Domagoj Bilješko
July 4	Monastir, Tunisia; Hard; M15; Singles and Doubles Draws	(China) Wang Xiaofei; 6–2, 6–4	(China) Te Rigele	(Tunisia) Aziz Dougaz (Burundi) Guy Orly Iradukunda	(France) Enzo Wallart (China) Zhang Ze (Serbia) Boris Butulija (France) Robin Bertrand
July 4	Monastir, Tunisia; Hard; M15; Singles and Doubles Draws	(Thailand) Maximus Jones (China) Zheng Baoluo; 6–4, 7–6^{(7–4)}	(India) Sai Karteek Reddy Ganta (India) Manish Sureshkumar	(Tunisia) Aziz Dougaz (Burundi) Guy Orly Iradukunda	(France) Enzo Wallart (China) Zhang Ze (Serbia) Boris Butulija (France) Robin Bertrand
July 4	Fountain Valley, United States; Hard; M15; Singles and Doubles Draws	(United States) Zachary Svajda; 6–3, 6–1	(United States) Sekou Bangoura	(Japan) Shuichi Sekiguchi (United States) Nathan Ponwith	(United States) Connor Farren (Japan) Yuta Kikuchi (Paraguay) Daniel Vallejo (United States) Eduardo Nava
July 4	Fountain Valley, United States; Hard; M15; Singles and Doubles Draws	(United States) Ethan Quinn (Paraguay) Daniel Vallejo; 6–0, 3–6, [10–8]	(Ghana) Abraham Asaba (United States) Sekou Bangoura	(Japan) Shuichi Sekiguchi (United States) Nathan Ponwith	(United States) Connor Farren (Japan) Yuta Kikuchi (Paraguay) Daniel Vallejo (United States) Eduardo Nava
July 4	Waco, United States; Hard; M15; Singles and Doubles Draws	(Australia) Adam Walton; 7–5, 0–6, 6–1	(Australia) Li Tu	(Japan) Shunsuke Mitsui (United Kingdom) Johannus Monday	(United States) Ronan Jachuck (United States) Tyler Zink (Canada) Chih Chi Huang (United States) Ezekiel Clark
July 4	Waco, United States; Hard; M15; Singles and Doubles Draws	(United States) George Goldhoff (United States) Tyler Zink; 4–6, 7–5, [10–7]	(United States) Mac Kiger (Canada) Benjamin Sigouin	(Japan) Shunsuke Mitsui (United Kingdom) Johannus Monday	(United States) Ronan Jachuck (United States) Tyler Zink (Canada) Chih Chi Huang (United States) Ezekiel Clark
July 11	Telfs, Austria; Clay; M25; Singles and Doubles Draws	(Turkey) Ergi Kırkın; 6–4, 7–5	(United States) Oliver Crawford	(France) Valentin Royer (Austria) Maximilian Neuchrist	(Hungary) Gergely Madarász (Germany) Tim Handel (Germany) Peter Heller (Czech Republic) Petr Nouza
July 11	Telfs, Austria; Clay; M25; Singles and Doubles Draws	(Austria) Sandro Kopp (Netherlands) Mick Veldheer; 6–4, 6–3	(Czech Republic) Ondřej Horák (Czech Republic) Daniel Siniakov	(France) Valentin Royer (Austria) Maximilian Neuchrist	(Hungary) Gergely Madarász (Germany) Tim Handel (Germany) Peter Heller (Czech Republic) Petr Nouza
July 11	Uriage, France; Clay; M25; Singles and Doubles Draws	(France) Ugo Blanchet; 6–2, 6–3	(France) Giovanni Mpetshi Perricard	(France) Timo Legout (Spain) Àlex Martí Pujolràs	(Spain) Pol Martín Tiffon (France) Lucas Bouquet (Spain) David Jordà Sanchis (France) Constantin Bittoun Kouzmine
July 11	Uriage, France; Clay; M25; Singles and Doubles Draws	(Ivory Coast) Eliakim Coulibaly (France) Giovanni Mpetshi Perricard; 6–3, 7–5	(Switzerland) Adrien Burdet (France) Alexandre Reco	(France) Timo Legout (Spain) Àlex Martí Pujolràs	(Spain) Pol Martín Tiffon (France) Lucas Bouquet (Spain) David Jordà Sanchis (France) Constantin Bittoun Kouzmine
July 11	Kassel, Germany; Clay; M25+H; Singles and Doubles Draws	(Czech Republic) Michael Vrbenský; 7–5, 6–7^{(3–7)}, 6–2	(Germany) Sebastian Fanselow	(Georgia (country)) Aleksandre Metreveli (Belgium) Raphaël Collignon	(Germany) Rudolf Molleker; Bogdan Bobrov; Ivan Nedelko (Germany) Max Hans Rehberg
July 11	Kassel, Germany; Clay; M25+H; Singles and Doubles Draws	(Germany) Constantin Frantzen (Germany) Tim Sandkaulen; 6–4, 6–2	(Germany) Tom Gentzsch (Germany) Leopold Zima	(Georgia (country)) Aleksandre Metreveli (Belgium) Raphaël Collignon	(Germany) Rudolf Molleker; Bogdan Bobrov; Ivan Nedelko (Germany) Max Hans Rehberg
July 11	Nur-Sultan, Kazakhstan; Hard; M25; Singles and Doubles Draws	(Uzbekistan) Sergey Fomin; 6–4, 2–6, 6–4	(Kazakhstan) Beibit Zhukayev	Konstantin Kravchuk (India) Prajnesh Gunneswaran	(New Zealand) Rubin Statham; Evgeny Philippov (Japan) Shintaro Imai (Georgia (country)) Zura Tkemaladze
July 11	Nur-Sultan, Kazakhstan; Hard; M25; Singles and Doubles Draws	(Estonia) Daniil Glinka (Estonia) Karl Kiur Saar; 7–6^{(7–4)}, 6–3	Ivan Liutarevich (Kazakhstan) Denis Yevseyev	Konstantin Kravchuk (India) Prajnesh Gunneswaran	(New Zealand) Rubin Statham; Evgeny Philippov (Japan) Shintaro Imai (Georgia (country)) Zura Tkemaladze
July 11	Idanha-a-Nova, Portugal; Hard; M25; Singles and Doubles Draws	(Japan) Rio Noguchi; 6–2, 6–4	(Israel) Ben Patael	(Portugal) Gonçalo Oliveira (France) Térence Atmane	(France) Robin Bertrand (Portugal) Pedro Araújo (Republic of Ireland) Simon Carr (Australia) Omar Jasika
July 11	Idanha-a-Nova, Portugal; Hard; M25; Singles and Doubles Draws	(Japan) Rio Noguchi (Greece) Alexandros Skorilas; 6–7^{(4–7)}, 6–3, [10–3]	(Chinese Taipei) Ray Ho (Canada) Kelsey Stevenson	(Portugal) Gonçalo Oliveira (France) Térence Atmane	(France) Robin Bertrand (Portugal) Pedro Araújo (Republic of Ireland) Simon Carr (Australia) Omar Jasika
July 11	Roehampton, United Kingdom; Grass; M25; Singles and Doubles Draws	(United Kingdom) Toby Samuel; 6–4, 6–7^{(8–10)}, 6–4	(United Kingdom) Henry Patten	(United Kingdom) Stuart Parker (United Kingdom) Mark Whitehouse	(United Kingdom) Alastair Gray (United Kingdom) James Story (United Kingdom) Daniel Cox (United Kingdom) Finn Bass
July 11	Roehampton, United Kingdom; Grass; M25; Singles and Doubles Draws	(United Kingdom) Julian Cash (United Kingdom) Henry Patten; Walkover	(Tunisia) Skander Mansouri (Switzerland) Luca Castelnuovo	(United Kingdom) Stuart Parker (United Kingdom) Mark Whitehouse	(United Kingdom) Alastair Gray (United Kingdom) James Story (United Kingdom) Daniel Cox (United Kingdom) Finn Bass
July 11	Aprilia, Italy; Clay; M15; Singles and Doubles Draws	(Italy) Enrico Dalla Valle; 6–3, 6–3	(Italy) Niccolò Catini	(Italy) Lorenzo Bresciani (Peru) Gonzalo Bueno	(Italy) Francesco Vilardo (Argentina) Franco Emanuel Egea; Alexandr Binda (Italy) Luciano Carraro
July 11	Aprilia, Italy; Clay; M15; Singles and Doubles Draws	(Argentina) Franco Emanuel Egea (Argentina) Gabriel Alejandro Hidalgo; 6–2, 6–3	(Peru) Gonzalo Bueno (Ecuador) Álvaro Guillén Meza	(Italy) Lorenzo Bresciani (Peru) Gonzalo Bueno	(Italy) Francesco Vilardo (Argentina) Franco Emanuel Egea; Alexandr Binda (Italy) Luciano Carraro
July 11	Cancún, Mexico; Hard; M15; Singles and Doubles Draws	(Australia) Adam Walton; 6–4, 6–1	(Brazil) Fernando Yamacita	(Japan) Masamichi Imamura (Mexico) Alan Fernando Rubio Fierros	(United States) Mwendwa Mbithi (Chile) Matías Soto (Japan) Seita Watanabe (Jamaica) Blaise Bicknell
July 11	Cancún, Mexico; Hard; M15; Singles and Doubles Draws	(United States) Trey Hilderbrand (United States) Noah Schachter; 7–5, 6–1	(Mexico) Alex Hernández (Mexico) Alan Fernando Rubio Fierros	(Japan) Masamichi Imamura (Mexico) Alan Fernando Rubio Fierros	(United States) Mwendwa Mbithi (Chile) Matías Soto (Japan) Seita Watanabe (Jamaica) Blaise Bicknell
July 11	Casablanca, Morocco; Clay; M15; Singles and Doubles Draws	(Italy) Federico Iannaccone; 6–4, 6–0	(Spain) Jorge Martínez Martínez	(Morocco) Younes Lalami Laaroussi (Spain) Max Alcalá Gurri	(Italy) Federico Campana (France) Alexandre Aubriot (Brazil) Paulo André Saraiva dos Santos (France) Nathan Seateun
July 11	Casablanca, Morocco; Clay; M15; Singles and Doubles Draws	(Czech Republic) Jan Jermář (Morocco) Younes Lalami Laaroussi; 6–4, 6–1	(Morocco) Walid Ahouda (Morocco) Mehdi Benchakroun	(Morocco) Younes Lalami Laaroussi (Spain) Max Alcalá Gurri	(Italy) Federico Campana (France) Alexandre Aubriot (Brazil) Paulo André Saraiva dos Santos (France) Nathan Seateun
July 11	Litija, Slovenia; Clay; M15; Singles and Doubles Draws	(Ukraine) Oleksandr Ovcharenko; 6–1, 6–7^{(6–8)}, 6–3	(Argentina) Juan Pablo Paz	(France) Amaury Raynel (Slovenia) Bor Artnak	(Croatia) Frane Ninčević (Czech Republic) Pavel Nejedlý (Italy) Marco Brugnerotto (Slovenia) Sebastian Dominko
July 11	Litija, Slovenia; Clay; M15; Singles and Doubles Draws	(Czech Republic) Patrik Rikl (Czech Republic) Matěj Vocel; 6–0, 6–2	(Croatia) Tomislav Podvinski (Croatia) Alen Rogić Hadžalić	(France) Amaury Raynel (Slovenia) Bor Artnak	(Croatia) Frane Ninčević (Czech Republic) Pavel Nejedlý (Italy) Marco Brugnerotto (Slovenia) Sebastian Dominko
July 11	Monastir, Tunisia; Hard; M15; Singles and Doubles Draws	(Jordan) Abedallah Shelbayh; 2–1, ret.	(Spain) Daniel Rincón	(China) Te Rigele (China) Mu Tao	(Italy) Gabriele Maria Noce (Germany) Robert Strombachs (India) Manish Sureshkumar (Burundi) Guy Orly Iradukunda
July 11	Monastir, Tunisia; Hard; M15; Singles and Doubles Draws	(India) Sai Karteek Reddy Ganta (India) Manish Sureshkumar; 3–6, 6–3, [10–8]	(India) Rithvik Choudary Bollipalli (India) Niki Kaliyanda Poonacha	(China) Te Rigele (China) Mu Tao	(Italy) Gabriele Maria Noce (Germany) Robert Strombachs (India) Manish Sureshkumar (Burundi) Guy Orly Iradukunda
July 11	Lakewood, United States; Hard; M15; Singles and Doubles Draws	(France) Jaimee Floyd Angele; 6–2, 7–5	(United States) Nathan Ponwith	(United States) Ethan Quinn (United States) Hudson Rivera	(United States) Kyle Kang (Paraguay) Daniel Vallejo (United States) Alexander Petrov (Chinese Taipei) Huang Tsung-hao
July 11	Lakewood, United States; Hard; M15; Singles and Doubles Draws	(United States) Eduardo Nava (United States) Nathan Ponwith; 6–3, 2–6, [10–4]	(United States) Bryce Nakashima (United States) Bjorn Swenson	(United States) Ethan Quinn (United States) Hudson Rivera	(United States) Kyle Kang (Paraguay) Daniel Vallejo (United States) Alexander Petrov (Chinese Taipei) Huang Tsung-hao
July 11	Pittsburgh, United States; Clay; M15; Singles and Doubles Draws	(United States) Kyle Seelig; 6–4, 6–3	(United States) AJ Catanzariti	(United States) Tyler Zink (United States) Mac Kiger	(United States) Tristan McCormick (United States) Meecah Bigun (Antigua and Barbuda) Jody Maginley (United States) Cannon Kingsley
July 11	Pittsburgh, United States; Clay; M15; Singles and Doubles Draws	(Canada) Cleeve Harper (United States) Tyler Zink; 6–7^{(3–7)}, 7–6^{(7–5)}, [10–6]	(United States) Nico Mostardi (United States) Luke Phillips	(United States) Tyler Zink (United States) Mac Kiger	(United States) Tristan McCormick (United States) Meecah Bigun (Antigua and Barbuda) Jody Maginley (United States) Cannon Kingsley
July 18	Esch-sur-Alzette, Luxembourg; Clay; M25; Singles and Doubles Draws	(Spain) Pol Martín Tiffon; 6–2, 6–0	(Germany) Sebastian Fanselow	(Dominican Republic) Nick Hardt (Israel) Yshai Oliel	(France) Tristan Lamasine (Spain) Álvaro López San Martín (Luxembourg) Chris Rodesch (Belgium) Kimmer Coppejans
July 18	Esch-sur-Alzette, Luxembourg; Clay; M25; Singles and Doubles Draws	(Luxembourg) Alex Knaff (Luxembourg) Chris Rodesch; 6–1, 6–4	(Luxembourg) Raphael Calzi (Germany) Marlon Vankan	(Dominican Republic) Nick Hardt (Israel) Yshai Oliel	(France) Tristan Lamasine (Spain) Álvaro López San Martín (Luxembourg) Chris Rodesch (Belgium) Kimmer Coppejans
July 18	Idanha-a-Nova, Portugal; Hard; M25; Singles and Doubles Draws	(Japan) Rio Noguchi; 6–2, 7–6^{(7–5)}	(Israel) Ben Patael	(Poland) Filip Peliwo (Portugal) Duarte Vale	(Portugal) Francisco Rocha (Portugal) Miguel Gomes (Portugal) Pedro Araújo (China) Sun Fajing
July 18	Idanha-a-Nova, Portugal; Hard; M25; Singles and Doubles Draws	(Portugal) Martim Leote Prata (Portugal) Duarte Vale; 6–3, 6–4	(Portugal) Pedro Araújo (Portugal) Jaime Faria	(Poland) Filip Peliwo (Portugal) Duarte Vale	(Portugal) Francisco Rocha (Portugal) Miguel Gomes (Portugal) Pedro Araújo (China) Sun Fajing
July 18	Radomlje, Slovenia; Clay; M25; Singles and Doubles Draws	(Ukraine) Oleksandr Ovcharenko; 6–4, 6–3	(Argentina) Matías Zukas	Bogdan Bobrov (Slovenia) Sebastian Dominko	(Serbia) Miljan Zekić (Brazil) Nicolas Zanellato (Argentina) Juan Pablo Paz (Italy) Tommaso Compagnucci
July 18	Radomlje, Slovenia; Clay; M25; Singles and Doubles Draws	Mikalai Haliak (Croatia) Frane Ninčević; 7–6^{(7–2)}, 4–6, [10–4]	(Slovenia) Žiga Kovačič (Slovenia) Jan Kupčič	Bogdan Bobrov (Slovenia) Sebastian Dominko	(Serbia) Miljan Zekić (Brazil) Nicolas Zanellato (Argentina) Juan Pablo Paz (Italy) Tommaso Compagnucci
July 18	Gandia, Spain; Clay; M25; Singles and Doubles Draws	(Spain) Carlos López Montagud; 6–7^{(2–7)}, 6–4, 7–5	(Spain) Javier Barranco Cosano	(Spain) David Jordà Sanchis (Spain) Max Alcalá Gurri	(France) Giovanni Mpetshi Perricard (Spain) José Francisco Vidal Azorín (Australia) Philip Sekulic (Spain) Carles Hernández
July 18	Gandia, Spain; Clay; M25; Singles and Doubles Draws	(Netherlands) Michiel de Krom (Netherlands) Ryan Nijboer; 6–4, 6–0	(Spain) Alejandro Manzanera Pertusa (Spain) Samuel Martínez Arjona	(Spain) David Jordà Sanchis (Spain) Max Alcalá Gurri	(France) Giovanni Mpetshi Perricard (Spain) José Francisco Vidal Azorín (Australia) Philip Sekulic (Spain) Carles Hernández
July 18	Champaign, United States; Hard; M25; Singles and Doubles Draws	(United States) Ethan Quinn; 6–4, 6–7^{(4–7)}, 6–2	(United States) Stefan Dostanic	(United States) Cannon Kingsley (United States) Patrick Kypson	(Syria) Kareem Al Allaf (United States) Eduardo Nava (Dominican Republic) Peter Bertran (United States) Omni Kumar
July 18	Champaign, United States; Hard; M25; Singles and Doubles Draws	(United States) Stefan Dostanic (United Kingdom) Johannus Monday; 7–6^{(7–4)}, 6–3	(Canada) Justin Boulais (Japan) James Kent Trotter	(United States) Cannon Kingsley (United States) Patrick Kypson	(Syria) Kareem Al Allaf (United States) Eduardo Nava (Dominican Republic) Peter Bertran (United States) Omni Kumar
July 18	Caloundra, Australia; Hard; M15; Singles and Doubles Draws	(Australia) Dane Sweeny; 6–3, 6–4	(Australia) Thomas Fancutt	(Japan) Rimpei Kawakami (Northern Mariana Islands) Colin Sinclair	(Japan) Takuto Niki (Australia) Jeremy Beale (Australia) Matthew Romios (Australia) Dayne Kelly
July 18	Caloundra, Australia; Hard; M15; Singles and Doubles Draws	(Australia) Jeremy Beale (Australia) Thomas Fancutt; 7–6^{(7–1)}, 6–3	(Australia) Aaron Addison (Australia) Matthew Romios	(Japan) Rimpei Kawakami (Northern Mariana Islands) Colin Sinclair	(Japan) Takuto Niki (Australia) Jeremy Beale (Australia) Matthew Romios (Australia) Dayne Kelly
July 18	Innsbruck, Austria; Clay; M15; Singles and Doubles Draws	(Austria) Sandro Kopp; 5–7, 6–1, 6–2	(Netherlands) Max Houkes	(France) Valentin Vacherot (Italy) Matteo Donati	(Colombia) Juan Manuel Benítez Chavarriaga (Slovakia) Michal Novanský (Italy) Marcello Serafini (Italy) Edoardo Lavagno
July 18	Innsbruck, Austria; Clay; M15; Singles and Doubles Draws	(Austria) Sandro Kopp (Austria) Neil Oberleitner; 6–2, 6–2	(Czech Republic) Adam Jurajda (Slovakia) Miloš Karol	(France) Valentin Vacherot (Italy) Matteo Donati	(Colombia) Juan Manuel Benítez Chavarriaga (Slovakia) Michal Novanský (Italy) Marcello Serafini (Italy) Edoardo Lavagno
July 18	Metzingen, Germany; Clay; M15; Singles and Doubles Draws	(Morocco) Adam Moundir; 7–5, 3–6, 6–1	(Hungary) Péter Fajta	(Netherlands) Sander Jong (United States) Alfredo Perez	(Netherlands) Deney Wassermann (Germany) Johannes Härteis (France) Amaury Raynel (Serbia) Stefan Popović
July 18	Metzingen, Germany; Clay; M15; Singles and Doubles Draws	(Croatia) Admir Kalender (Croatia) Antonio Šančić; 7–6^{(7–5)}, 6–3	(United States) Alfredo Perez (Slovakia) Lukáš Pokorný	(Netherlands) Sander Jong (United States) Alfredo Perez	(Netherlands) Deney Wassermann (Germany) Johannes Härteis (France) Amaury Raynel (Serbia) Stefan Popović
July 18	Gubbio, Italy; Clay; M15; Singles and Doubles Draws	(Italy) Francesco Forti; 6–4, 4–6, 6–1	(Morocco) Younes Lalami Laaroussi	(France) Gabriel Debru (Italy) Luca Potenza	(Italy) Gabriele Piraino (Italy) Andrea Picchione (Ecuador) Álvaro Guillén Meza (Italy) Federico Arnaboldi
July 18	Gubbio, Italy; Clay; M15; Singles and Doubles Draws	(Peru) Gonzalo Bueno (Ecuador) Álvaro Guillén Meza; Walkover	(Italy) Francesco Forti (Italy) Gabriele Piraino	(France) Gabriel Debru (Italy) Luca Potenza	(Italy) Gabriele Piraino (Italy) Andrea Picchione (Ecuador) Álvaro Guillén Meza (Italy) Federico Arnaboldi
July 18	Seremban, Malaysia; Hard; M15; Singles and Doubles Draws	(Japan) Daisuke Sumizawa; 6–0, 6–2	(Japan) Shinji Hazawa	(South Korea) Son Ji-hoon (South Korea) Park Ui-sung	(India) Vishnu Vardhan (Japan) Tomohiro Masabayashi (Japan) Kento Takeuchi (Thailand) Kasidit Samrej
July 18	Seremban, Malaysia; Hard; M15; Singles and Doubles Draws	(Japan) Tomohiro Masabayashi (Japan) Daisuke Sumizawa; 6–4, 6–7^{(5–7)}, [13–11]	(China) Cui Jie (Chinese Taipei) Huang Tsung-hao	(South Korea) Son Ji-hoon (South Korea) Park Ui-sung	(India) Vishnu Vardhan (Japan) Tomohiro Masabayashi (Japan) Kento Takeuchi (Thailand) Kasidit Samrej
July 18	Cancún, Mexico; Hard; M15; Singles and Doubles Draws	(France) Enzo Wallart; 6–3, 6–3	(Chile) Matías Soto	(Japan) Masamichi Imamura (Australia) Adam Walton	(United States) Samir Banerjee (Argentina) Tomás Farjat (Uruguay) Ignacio Carou (Mexico) Ivar José Aramburu Contreras
July 18	Cancún, Mexico; Hard; M15; Singles and Doubles Draws	(United States) Trey Hilderbrand (United States) Noah Schachter; 5–7, 6–1, [10–8]	(Japan) Masamichi Imamura (Japan) Seita Watanabe	(Japan) Masamichi Imamura (Australia) Adam Walton	(United States) Samir Banerjee (Argentina) Tomás Farjat (Uruguay) Ignacio Carou (Mexico) Ivar José Aramburu Contreras
July 18	Colombo, Sri Lanka; Clay; M15; Singles and Doubles Draws	(India) Manish Sureshkumar; 6–4, 6–0	(France) Quentin Folliot	(India) Digvijay Pratap Singh (Ukraine) Eric Vanshelboim	(India) Rishi Reddy (India) Karan Singh (India) Nitin Kumar Sinha (India) Fardeen Qamar
July 18	Colombo, Sri Lanka; Clay; M15; Singles and Doubles Draws	(India) S D Prajwal Dev (India) Rishi Reddy; 7–5, 6–3	(India) Parikshit Somani (India) Manish Sureshkumar	(India) Digvijay Pratap Singh (Ukraine) Eric Vanshelboim	(India) Rishi Reddy (India) Karan Singh (India) Nitin Kumar Sinha (India) Fardeen Qamar
July 18	Monastir, Tunisia; Hard; M15; Singles and Doubles Draws	(Jordan) Abedallah Shelbayh; 7–6^{(7–3)}, 6–4	(Tunisia) Skander Mansouri	(France) Cyril Vandermeersch (China) Mu Tao	(France) Damien Salvestre (India) Niki Kaliyanda Poonacha (Germany) Robert Strombachs (France) Sascha Gueymard Wayenburg
July 18	Monastir, Tunisia; Hard; M15; Singles and Doubles Draws	(France) Antoine Monaco (France) Cyril Vandermeersch; 6–4, 4–6, [10–2]	(Algeria) Mohamed Ali Abibsi (Czech Republic) Filip Apltauer	(France) Cyril Vandermeersch (China) Mu Tao	(France) Damien Salvestre (India) Niki Kaliyanda Poonacha (Germany) Robert Strombachs (France) Sascha Gueymard Wayenburg
July 25	Tbilisi, Georgia; Hard; M25; Singles and Doubles Draws	Savva Polukhin; 6–2, 6–4	(Bulgaria) Alexandar Lazarov	Evgeny Philippov; Evgenii Tiurnev	(India) Prajnesh Gunneswaran (Turkey) Yankı Erel (Georgia (country)) Aleksandre Bakshi (Australia) Akira Santillan
July 25	Tbilisi, Georgia; Hard; M25; Singles and Doubles Draws	(South Korea) Hong Seong-chan (South Korea) Song Min-kyu; 6–7^{(3–7)}, 7–6^{(7–3)}, [10–6]	Aliaksandr Liaonenka; Alexander Zgirovsky	Evgeny Philippov; Evgenii Tiurnev	(India) Prajnesh Gunneswaran (Turkey) Yankı Erel (Georgia (country)) Aleksandre Bakshi (Australia) Akira Santillan
July 25	Bacău, Romania; Clay; M25+H; Singles and Doubles Draws	(United States) Oliver Crawford; 2–6, 6–3, 7–5	(Tunisia) Moez Echargui	Bogdan Bobrov (Italy) Alexander Weis	(Romania) David Ionel (Romania) Vlad Andrei Dancu (United States) Nicholas Bybel (Argentina) Valerio Aboian
July 25	Bacău, Romania; Clay; M25+H; Singles and Doubles Draws	(Chinese Taipei) Ray Ho (Moldova) Ilya Snițari; 6–3, 6–4	(Ukraine) Oleksandr Bielinskyi (United States) Nicholas Bybel	Bogdan Bobrov (Italy) Alexander Weis	(Romania) David Ionel (Romania) Vlad Andrei Dancu (United States) Nicholas Bybel (Argentina) Valerio Aboian
July 25	Dénia, Spain; Clay; M25; Singles and Doubles Draws	(Dominican Republic) Nick Hardt; 3–6, 6–3, 6–2	(Argentina) Mariano Navone	(Spain) Jorge Martínez Martínez (Belgium) Joris De Loore	(Spain) Sergi Pérez Contri (Spain) José Francisco Vidal Azorín (France) Kyrian Jacquet (Spain) Javier Molino
July 25	Dénia, Spain; Clay; M25; Singles and Doubles Draws	(Spain) Alejandro García (Spain) Mario Mansilla Díez; 6–2, 6–3	(Spain) Alejandro Manzanera Pertusa (Spain) Samuel Martínez Arjona	(Spain) Jorge Martínez Martínez (Belgium) Joris De Loore	(Spain) Sergi Pérez Contri (Spain) José Francisco Vidal Azorín (France) Kyrian Jacquet (Spain) Javier Molino
July 25	Nottingham, United Kingdom; Grass; M25; Singles and Doubles Draws	(United Kingdom) Arthur Fery; 7–5, 2–6, 7–5	(United Kingdom) Daniel Cox	(Australia) Tristan Schoolkate (United Kingdom) Charles Broom	(United Kingdom) Stuart Parker (Japan) Rio Noguchi (United Kingdom) Harry Wendelken (United Kingdom) Toby Samuel
July 25	Nottingham, United Kingdom; Grass; M25; Singles and Doubles Draws	(United Kingdom) Alastair Gray (United Kingdom) Stuart Parker; 7–6^{(7–4)}, 4–6, [10–5]	(United Kingdom) Charles Broom (United Kingdom) Luke Johnson	(Australia) Tristan Schoolkate (United Kingdom) Charles Broom	(United Kingdom) Stuart Parker (Japan) Rio Noguchi (United Kingdom) Harry Wendelken (United Kingdom) Toby Samuel
July 25	Edwardsville, United States; Hard; M25; Singles and Doubles Draws	(Japan) James Kent Trotter; 3–6, 6–4, 6–1	(United States) Nathan Ponwith	(United States) Sam Riffice (United States) Patrick Kypson	(United States) Michael Zheng (United States) Jack Anthrop (United States) Ezekiel Clark (Latvia) Kārlis Ozoliņš
July 25	Edwardsville, United States; Hard; M25; Singles and Doubles Draws	(Japan) Makoto Ochi (Japan) Seita Watanabe; 7–6^{(7–1)}, 6–3	(United States) Kweisi Kenyatte (United States) Cooper Williams	(United States) Sam Riffice (United States) Patrick Kypson	(United States) Michael Zheng (United States) Jack Anthrop (United States) Ezekiel Clark (Latvia) Kārlis Ozoliņš
July 25	Caloundra, Australia; Hard; M15; Singles and Doubles Draws	(Australia) Dayne Kelly; 6–1, 1–6, 7–5	(Australia) Dane Sweeny	(New Zealand) Isaac Becroft (Australia) Mitchell Harper	(Australia) Corey Gaal (Japan) Rimpei Kawakami (Japan) Ryotaro Matsumura (Australia) Charlie Camus
July 25	Caloundra, Australia; Hard; M15; Singles and Doubles Draws	(Australia) Aaron Addison (Australia) Matthew Romios; 6–4, 3–6, [10–5]	(Australia) Blake Bayldon (Australia) Jordan Smith	(New Zealand) Isaac Becroft (Australia) Mitchell Harper	(Australia) Corey Gaal (Japan) Rimpei Kawakami (Japan) Ryotaro Matsumura (Australia) Charlie Camus
July 25	Kottingbrunn, Austria; Clay; M15; Singles and Doubles Draws	(France) Valentin Vacherot; 6–3, 6–4	(Netherlands) Max Houkes	(North Macedonia) Kalin Ivanovski (Italy) Giovanni Oradini	(France) Nathan Seateun (Austria) Peter Goldsteiner (Austria) Lukas Krainer (Ivory Coast) Eliakim Coulibaly
July 25	Kottingbrunn, Austria; Clay; M15; Singles and Doubles Draws	(Germany) Niklas Schell (China) Sun Fajing; 6–4, 6–2	(Italy) Stefano Battaglino (Italy) Lorenzo Rottoli	(North Macedonia) Kalin Ivanovski (Italy) Giovanni Oradini	(France) Nathan Seateun (Austria) Peter Goldsteiner (Austria) Lukas Krainer (Ivory Coast) Eliakim Coulibaly
July 25	Vejle, Denmark; Clay; M15; Singles and Doubles Draws	(Luxembourg) Chris Rodesch; 6–4, 4–6, 6–0	(Netherlands) Mick Veldheer	(Denmark) August Holmgren (Germany) Marlon Vankan	(Austria) Sandro Kopp (France) Maxime Chazal (Denmark) Christian Sigsgaard (Germany) Lewie Lane
July 25	Vejle, Denmark; Clay; M15; Singles and Doubles Draws	(Denmark) Benjamin Hannestad (Denmark) Carl Emil Overbeck; 7–5, 6–7^{(9–11)}, [14–12]	(Denmark) Anders Grinderslev (Denmark) Elmer Møller	(Denmark) August Holmgren (Germany) Marlon Vankan	(Austria) Sandro Kopp (France) Maxime Chazal (Denmark) Christian Sigsgaard (Germany) Lewie Lane
July 25	Kuala Lumpur, Malaysia; Hard; M15; Singles and Doubles Draws	(Vietnam) Lý Hoàng Nam; 7–5, 6–3	(Japan) Yuta Shimizu	(South Korea) Park Ui-sung (United States) Andre Ilagan	(Thailand) Thantub Suksumrarn (Japan) Keisuke Saitoh (Thailand) Kasidit Samrej (Japan) Shinji Hazawa
July 25	Kuala Lumpur, Malaysia; Hard; M15; Singles and Doubles Draws	(Japan) Yuta Shimizu (Japan) Ryota Tanuma; 7–6^{(7–4)}, 6–2	(Japan) Shinji Hazawa (Japan) Kento Takeuchi	(South Korea) Park Ui-sung (United States) Andre Ilagan	(Thailand) Thantub Suksumrarn (Japan) Keisuke Saitoh (Thailand) Kasidit Samrej (Japan) Shinji Hazawa
July 25	Łódź, Poland; Clay; M15; Singles and Doubles Draws	(Poland) Paweł Ciaś; 6–4, 7–6^{(7–4)}	(Poland) Maks Kaśnikowski	(Czech Republic) Petr Nouza (Poland) Szymon Kielan	(Germany) Marcel Zielinski (United States) William Grant (Czech Republic) Filip Duda (Estonia) Kristjan Tamm
July 25	Łódź, Poland; Clay; M15; Singles and Doubles Draws	(Poland) Szymon Kielan (Czech Republic) Petr Nouza; 7–5, 6–4	(Slovakia) Miloš Karol (Slovakia) Lukáš Pokorný	(Czech Republic) Petr Nouza (Poland) Szymon Kielan	(Germany) Marcel Zielinski (United States) William Grant (Czech Republic) Filip Duda (Estonia) Kristjan Tamm
July 25	Castelo Branco, Portugal; Hard; M15; Singles and Doubles Draws	(Portugal) Jaime Faria; 6–3, 7–6^{(8–6)}	(France) Robin Bertrand	(Australia) Kody Pearson (France) Raphaël Lambling	(Portugal) Francisco Rocha (Chile) Diego Fernández Flores (Portugal) Pedro Araújo (Portugal) Fábio Coelho
July 25	Castelo Branco, Portugal; Hard; M15; Singles and Doubles Draws	(Portugal) Fábio Coelho (Portugal) Jaime Faria; 6–2, 6–4	(France) Maxence Brovillé (France) Pierre Delage	(Australia) Kody Pearson (France) Raphaël Lambling	(Portugal) Francisco Rocha (Chile) Diego Fernández Flores (Portugal) Pedro Araújo (Portugal) Fábio Coelho
July 25	Novi Sad, Serbia; Clay; M15; Singles and Doubles Draws	(Brazil) Nicolas Zanellato; 6–1, 6–2	(Czech Republic) Tadeáš Paroulek	(Bulgaria) Petr Nesterov (Peru) Gonzalo Bueno	Kirill Kivattsev (Montenegro) Rrezart Cungu (Bulgaria) Simon Anthony Ivanov (France) Luka Pavlovic
July 25	Novi Sad, Serbia; Clay; M15; Singles and Doubles Draws	(Serbia) Viktor Jović; Marat Sharipov; 6–3, 6–4	(Bulgaria) Simon Anthony Ivanov (Bulgaria) Petr Nesterov	(Bulgaria) Petr Nesterov (Peru) Gonzalo Bueno	Kirill Kivattsev (Montenegro) Rrezart Cungu (Bulgaria) Simon Anthony Ivanov (France) Luka Pavlovic
July 25	Colombo, Sri Lanka; Clay; M15; Singles and Doubles Draws	(Ukraine) Eric Vanshelboim; 1–6, 6–4, 6–2	(India) S D Prajwal Dev	(India) Manish Sureshkumar (India) Digvijay Pratap Singh	(Thailand) Palaphoom Kovapitukted (India) Rishi Reddy (India) Adil Kalyanpur (India) Siddharth Vishwakarma
July 25	Colombo, Sri Lanka; Clay; M15; Singles and Doubles Draws	(India) Parikshit Somani (India) Manish Sureshkumar; 7–6^{(8–6)}, 7–5	(France) Quentin Folliot (Ukraine) Eric Vanshelboim	(India) Manish Sureshkumar (India) Digvijay Pratap Singh	(Thailand) Palaphoom Kovapitukted (India) Rishi Reddy (India) Adil Kalyanpur (India) Siddharth Vishwakarma
July 25	Monastir, Tunisia; Hard; M15; Singles and Doubles Draws	(China) Mu Tao; 6–3, 6–3	(China) Te Rigele	(Tunisia) Skander Mansouri (Germany) Robert Strombachs	(India) Niki Kaliyanda Poonacha (France) Maxence Beaugé (France) Constantin Bittoun Kouzmine (South Africa) Kris van Wyk
July 25	Monastir, Tunisia; Hard; M15; Singles and Doubles Draws	(Tunisia) Skander Mansouri (Tunisia) Aziz Ouakaa; 7–6^{(7–3)}, 6–3	(Australia) Ken Cavrak (Australia) Chase Ferguson	(Tunisia) Skander Mansouri (Germany) Robert Strombachs	(India) Niki Kaliyanda Poonacha (France) Maxence Beaugé (France) Constantin Bittoun Kouzmine (South Africa) Kris van Wyk

=== August ===
Week of	Tournament	Winner	Runners-up	Semifinalists	Quarterfinalists
August 1	Portoviejo, Ecuador; Clay; M25; Singles and Doubles Draws	(Chile) Matías Soto; 6–3, 7–6^{(7–4)}	(Brazil) José Pereira	(Brazil) João Lucas Reis da Silva (United States) Tristan McCormick	(Chile) Gonzalo Lama (Argentina) Leonardo Aboian (Argentina) Juan Bautista Otegui (Argentina) Facundo Juárez
August 1	Portoviejo, Ecuador; Clay; M25; Singles and Doubles Draws	(Ecuador) Andrés Andrade (United States) Tristan McCormick; 7–6^{(7–5)}, 6–3	(Chile) Miguel Fernando Pereira (Chile) Matías Soto	(Brazil) João Lucas Reis da Silva (United States) Tristan McCormick	(Chile) Gonzalo Lama (Argentina) Leonardo Aboian (Argentina) Juan Bautista Otegui (Argentina) Facundo Juárez
August 1	Tbilisi, Georgia; Hard; M25; Singles and Doubles Draws	(Poland) Kacper Żuk; 6–2, 6–4	(Georgia (country)) Aleksandre Metreveli	(Czech Republic) David Poljak (India) Prajnesh Gunneswaran	(Georgia (country)) Zura Tkemaladze; Alexander Zgirovsky (Uzbekistan) Sergey Fomin (Georgia (country)) Aleksandre Bakshi
August 1	Tbilisi, Georgia; Hard; M25; Singles and Doubles Draws	(South Korea) Hong Seong-chan (South Korea) Song Min-kyu; 7–5, 6–2	Ivan Liutarevich (Czech Republic) David Poljak	(Czech Republic) David Poljak (India) Prajnesh Gunneswaran	(Georgia (country)) Zura Tkemaladze; Alexander Zgirovsky (Uzbekistan) Sergey Fomin (Georgia (country)) Aleksandre Bakshi
August 1	Wetzlar, Germany; Clay; M25; Singles and Doubles Draws	(Germany) Rudolf Molleker; 7–6^{(7–3)}, 6–1	(Dominican Republic) Nick Hardt	(Belgium) Raphaël Collignon (Bulgaria) Adrian Andreev	(United Kingdom) Jan Choinski (Germany) Julian Lenz (Germany) Philip Florig (Germany) Florian Broska
August 1	Wetzlar, Germany; Clay; M25; Singles and Doubles Draws	(Germany) Benjamin Hassan (France) Tristan Lamasine; 6–4, 6–3	(Germany) Constantin Frantzen (Germany) Tim Sandkaulen	(Belgium) Raphaël Collignon (Bulgaria) Adrian Andreev	(United Kingdom) Jan Choinski (Germany) Julian Lenz (Germany) Philip Florig (Germany) Florian Broska
August 1	Bolzano, Italy; Clay; M25; Singles and Doubles Draws	(United States) Christian Langmo; 7–6^{(11–9)}, 6–3	(Italy) Francesco Forti	(Italy) Stefano Napolitano (Italy) Luca Potenza	Ivan Gakhov (Italy) Alexander Weis (Italy) Giovanni Oradini (Romania) Ștefan Paloși
August 1	Bolzano, Italy; Clay; M25; Singles and Doubles Draws	(Italy) Francesco Forti (Italy) Filippo Romano; 7–6^{(7–4)}, 6–3	(Italy) Federico Bertuccioli (Italy) Andrea Picchione	(Italy) Stefano Napolitano (Italy) Luca Potenza	Ivan Gakhov (Italy) Alexander Weis (Italy) Giovanni Oradini (Romania) Ștefan Paloși
August 1	Agadir, Morocco; Clay; M25; Singles and Doubles Draws	(France) Émilien Voisin; 6–3, 7–6^{(7–5)}	(Spain) Álvaro López San Martín	(Argentina) Mariano Navone (France) Jurgen Briand	(France) Timo Legout (Portugal) Gonçalo Oliveira (Italy) Tommaso Compagnucci (Belgium) Joris De Loore
August 1	Agadir, Morocco; Clay; M25; Singles and Doubles Draws	(Spain) Álvaro López San Martín (Argentina) Mariano Navone; 3–6, 6–4, [10–5]	(Germany) Nico Hornitschek (Germany) Jimmy Yang	(Argentina) Mariano Navone (France) Jurgen Briand	(France) Timo Legout (Portugal) Gonçalo Oliveira (Italy) Tommaso Compagnucci (Belgium) Joris De Loore
August 1	Pitești, Romania; Clay; M25; Singles and Doubles Draws	(Romania) Nicholas David Ionel; 6–3, 3–6, 6–4	(Argentina) Juan Pablo Paz	(Tunisia) Moez Echargui (Moldova) Ilya Snițari	(France) Valentin Royer (Argentina) Valerio Aboian (Ukraine) Illya Beloborodko (Bulgaria) Alexandar Lazarov
August 1	Pitești, Romania; Clay; M25; Singles and Doubles Draws	(Romania) Sebastian Gima (Moldova) Ilya Snițari; 6–4, 6–3	(Romania) Dragoș Nicolae Cazacu (Romania) Ioan Alexandru Chiriță	(Tunisia) Moez Echargui (Moldova) Ilya Snițari	(France) Valentin Royer (Argentina) Valerio Aboian (Ukraine) Illya Beloborodko (Bulgaria) Alexandar Lazarov
August 1	Nottingham, United Kingdom; Grass; M25; Singles and Doubles Draws	(United Kingdom) Alastair Gray; 3–6, 6–4, 7–5	(United Kingdom) Daniel Cox	(United Kingdom) Max Basing (Australia) Tristan Schoolkate	(United Kingdom) Stuart Parker (United Kingdom) Finn Bass (Japan) Rio Noguchi (United Kingdom) Patrick Brady
August 1	Nottingham, United Kingdom; Grass; M25; Singles and Doubles Draws	(United Kingdom) Charles Broom (United Kingdom) Luke Johnson; 6–1, 7–6^{(7–4)}	(United Kingdom) Ben Jones (United Kingdom) Joe Tyler	(United Kingdom) Max Basing (Australia) Tristan Schoolkate	(United Kingdom) Stuart Parker (United Kingdom) Finn Bass (Japan) Rio Noguchi (United Kingdom) Patrick Brady
August 1	Decatur, United States; Hard; M25; Singles and Doubles Draws	(United Kingdom) Johannus Monday; 6–3, 6–3	(United States) Ezekiel Clark	(United States) Tyler Zink (Japan) Makoto Ochi	(United States) Hunter Heck (United States) Garrett Johns (United States) Murphy Cassone (France) Jaimee Floyd Angele
August 1	Decatur, United States; Hard; M25; Singles and Doubles Draws	(United States) George Goldhoff (United States) Tyler Zink; 6–3, 6–4	(Japan) Taisei Ichikawa (Japan) Seita Watanabe	(United States) Tyler Zink (Japan) Makoto Ochi	(United States) Hunter Heck (United States) Garrett Johns (United States) Murphy Cassone (France) Jaimee Floyd Angele
August 1	Kottingbrunn, Austria; Clay; M15; Singles and Doubles Draws	(Italy) Matteo Donati; 7–6^{(7–3)}, 6–3	(France) Corentin Denolly	(Netherlands) Max Houkes (Germany) Kai Lemstra	(France) Thomas Deschamps (Czech Republic) Pavel Nejedlý (Italy) Lorenzo Rottoli (Germany) Dominik Böhler
August 1	Kottingbrunn, Austria; Clay; M15; Singles and Doubles Draws	(Slovakia) Miloš Karol (United States) Toby Kodat; 7–6^{(7–3)}, 7–5	(Italy) Francesco Ferrari (Italy) Alessio Zanotti	(Netherlands) Max Houkes (Germany) Kai Lemstra	(France) Thomas Deschamps (Czech Republic) Pavel Nejedlý (Italy) Lorenzo Rottoli (Germany) Dominik Böhler
August 1	Frederiksberg, Denmark; Clay; M15; Singles and Doubles Draws	(Sweden) Karl Friberg; 6–7^{(4–7)}, 6–3, 6–3	(France) Maxime Chazal	(Sweden) Leo Borg (Netherlands) Mick Veldheer	(France) Alexandre Aubriot (Denmark) Christian Sigsgaard (Germany) Alessio Vasquez Gehrke (Denmark) August Holmgren
August 1	Frederiksberg, Denmark; Clay; M15; Singles and Doubles Draws	(Denmark) Johannes Ingildsen (Denmark) Christian Sigsgaard; 7–6^{(11–9)}, 6–4	(Denmark) Benjamin Hannestad (Denmark) Carl Emil Overbeck	(Sweden) Leo Borg (Netherlands) Mick Veldheer	(France) Alexandre Aubriot (Denmark) Christian Sigsgaard (Germany) Alessio Vasquez Gehrke (Denmark) August Holmgren
August 1	Pärnu, Estonia; Clay; M15; Singles and Doubles Draws	(Argentina) Fermín Tenti; 7–5, 3–6, 7–5	(Poland) Maks Kaśnikowski	(Estonia) Kristjan Tamm (Finland) Eero Vasa	(United States) William Grant (Poland) Szymon Kielan (France) Nathan Seateun (Poland) Maciej Rajski
August 1	Pärnu, Estonia; Clay; M15; Singles and Doubles Draws	(Poland) Szymon Kielan (Poland) Yann Wójcik; 6–2, 6–4	(Finland) Eero Vasa (Finland) Iiro Vasa	(Estonia) Kristjan Tamm (Finland) Eero Vasa	(United States) William Grant (Poland) Szymon Kielan (France) Nathan Seateun (Poland) Maciej Rajski
August 1	Kfar Saba, Israel; Hard; M15; Singles and Doubles Draws	(Israel) Sahar Simon; 6–3, 4–6, 6–2	(Israel) Ben Patael	(Israel) Orel Kimhi (Israel) Alon Elia	(Israel) Jordan Hasson (United States) Jacob Brumm (United Kingdom) Tiran Sanghera (Cyprus) Menelaos Efstathiou
August 1	Kfar Saba, Israel; Hard; M15; Singles and Doubles Draws	(Greece) Demetris Azoides (Cyprus) Menelaos Efstathiou; 6–4, 7–6^{(7–5)}	(Israel) Ron Ellouck (Japan) Yuichiro Inui	(Israel) Orel Kimhi (Israel) Alon Elia	(Israel) Jordan Hasson (United States) Jacob Brumm (United Kingdom) Tiran Sanghera (Cyprus) Menelaos Efstathiou
August 1	Ust-Kamenogorsk, Kazakhstan; Hard; M15; Singles and Doubles Draws	Bekhan Atlangeriev; 6–3, 6–4	Savriyan Danilov	Konstantin Kravchuk (Kazakhstan) Grigoriy Lomakin	(Kazakhstan) Dostanbek Tashbulatov; Mikhail Dubrouski (Kazakhstan) Timur Maulenov; Ivan Denisov
August 1	Ust-Kamenogorsk, Kazakhstan; Hard; M15; Singles and Doubles Draws	Bekhan Atlangeriev; Ivan Denisov; 6–4, 6–2	Konstantin Kravchuk; Viacheslav Ovchinnikov	Konstantin Kravchuk (Kazakhstan) Grigoriy Lomakin	(Kazakhstan) Dostanbek Tashbulatov; Mikhail Dubrouski (Kazakhstan) Timur Maulenov; Ivan Denisov
August 1	Kuching, Malaysia; Hard; M15; Singles and Doubles Draws	(Japan) Yuta Shimizu; 6–1, 6–2	(Vietnam) Lý Hoàng Nam	(Australia) Moerani Bouzige (United States) Andre Ilagan	(Japan) Kokoro Isomura (Japan) Ryota Tanuma (Japan) Tomohiro Masabayashi (Chinese Taipei) Huang Tsung-hao
August 1	Kuching, Malaysia; Hard; M15; Singles and Doubles Draws	(Japan) Yuta Shimizu (Japan) Ryota Tanuma; 6–1, 6–1	(Japan) Kokoro Isomura (Japan) Yamato Sueoka	(Australia) Moerani Bouzige (United States) Andre Ilagan	(Japan) Kokoro Isomura (Japan) Ryota Tanuma (Japan) Tomohiro Masabayashi (Chinese Taipei) Huang Tsung-hao
August 1	Novi Sad, Serbia; Clay; M15; Singles and Doubles Draws	(Czech Republic) Tadeáš Paroulek; 7–5, 7–6^{(7–3)}	(Serbia) Kristijan Juhas	(France) Florent Bax (Montenegro) Rrezart Cungu	(Ukraine) Oleksandr Ovcharenko; Marat Sharipov (Bulgaria) Gabriel Donev (Italy) Luca Tomasetto
August 1	Novi Sad, Serbia; Clay; M15; Singles and Doubles Draws	(Croatia) Frane Ninčević (Ukraine) Oleksandr Ovcharenko; 7–5, 3–6, [11–9]	(Serbia) Viktor Jović; Marat Sharipov	(France) Florent Bax (Montenegro) Rrezart Cungu	(Ukraine) Oleksandr Ovcharenko; Marat Sharipov (Bulgaria) Gabriel Donev (Italy) Luca Tomasetto
August 1	Xàtiva, Spain; Clay; M15; Singles and Doubles Draws	(Spain) Pedro Ródenas; 7–6^{(7–5)}, 6–2	(Spain) Jorge Martínez Martínez	(Spain) Max Alcalá Gurri (Spain) Alejandro Manzanera Pertusa	(Spain) José Francisco Vidal Azorín (Spain) Diego Augusto Barreto Sánchez (Argentina) Alex Barrena (Spain) Iñaki Cabrera Bello
August 1	Xàtiva, Spain; Clay; M15; Singles and Doubles Draws	(Spain) Alejandro García (Spain) Mario Mansilla Díez; 6–2, 7–6^{(7–2)}	(Spain) Max Alcalá Gurri (Spain) Bruno Pujol Navarro	(Spain) Max Alcalá Gurri (Spain) Alejandro Manzanera Pertusa	(Spain) José Francisco Vidal Azorín (Spain) Diego Augusto Barreto Sánchez (Argentina) Alex Barrena (Spain) Iñaki Cabrera Bello
August 1	Monastir, Tunisia; Hard; M15; Singles and Doubles Draws	(Estonia) Mark Lajal; 6–2, 3–6, 6–3	(France) Constantin Bittoun Kouzmine	(China) Te Rigele (France) Robin Bertrand	(France) Titouan Droguet (France) Arthur Bouquier (Germany) Robert Strombachs (France) Maxence Beaugé
August 1	Monastir, Tunisia; Hard; M15; Singles and Doubles Draws	(India) Rithvik Choudary Bollipalli (India) Niki Kaliyanda Poonacha; 6–3, 6–4	(China) Li Majun (China) Tang Sheng	(China) Te Rigele (France) Robin Bertrand	(France) Titouan Droguet (France) Arthur Bouquier (Germany) Robert Strombachs (France) Maxence Beaugé
August 8	Guayaquil, Ecuador; Clay; M25; Singles and Doubles Draws	(Chile) Gonzalo Lama; 6–4, 4–6, 6–2	(Brazil) João Lucas Reis da Silva	(United States) Kyle Seelig (Argentina) Matías Franco Descotte	(Chile) Ignacio Antonio Becerra Otarola (United States) Tristan McCormick (Argentina) Leonardo Aboian (Brazil) José Pereira
August 8	Guayaquil, Ecuador; Clay; M25; Singles and Doubles Draws	(Ecuador) Andrés Andrade (United States) Tristan McCormick; 7–6^{(11–9)}, 7–6^{(7–2)}	(Argentina) Leonardo Aboian (Argentina) Matías Franco Descotte	(United States) Kyle Seelig (Argentina) Matías Franco Descotte	(Chile) Ignacio Antonio Becerra Otarola (United States) Tristan McCormick (Argentina) Leonardo Aboian (Brazil) José Pereira
August 8	Tbilisi, Georgia; Hard; M25; Singles and Doubles Draws	(China) Bu Yunchaokete; 6–3, 2–6, 6–3	(Israel) Edan Leshem	(Turkey) Yankı Erel (Georgia (country)) Aleksandre Metreveli	Aliaksandr Liaonenka; Ivan Liutarevich (Estonia) Daniil Glinka (Kazakhstan) Grigoriy Lomakin
August 8	Tbilisi, Georgia; Hard; M25; Singles and Doubles Draws	Ivan Liutarevich (Kazakhstan) Grigoriy Lomakin; 3–6, 7–6^{(7–4)}, [10–5]	Erik Arutiunian; Daniil Ostapenkov	(Turkey) Yankı Erel (Georgia (country)) Aleksandre Metreveli	Aliaksandr Liaonenka; Ivan Liutarevich (Estonia) Daniil Glinka (Kazakhstan) Grigoriy Lomakin
August 8	Padova, Italy; Clay; M25; Singles and Doubles Draws	(Italy) Federico Arnaboldi; 6–2, 6–1	(Italy) Gabriele Piraino	(Italy) Fausto Tabacco (Italy) Giacomo Dambrosi	(Ukraine) Oleksandr Ovcharenko (Spain) Pablo Llamas Ruiz (Bolivia) Murkel Dellien (Italy) Giovanni Oradini
August 8	Padova, Italy; Clay; M25; Singles and Doubles Draws	(Australia) Jason Taylor (Australia) Brandon Walkin; 7–6^{(7–3)}, 6–0	(Croatia) Duje Ajduković (Croatia) Frane Ninčević	(Italy) Fausto Tabacco (Italy) Giacomo Dambrosi	(Ukraine) Oleksandr Ovcharenko (Spain) Pablo Llamas Ruiz (Bolivia) Murkel Dellien (Italy) Giovanni Oradini
August 8	Ystad, Sweden; Clay; M25; Singles and Doubles Draws	(France) Mathys Erhard; 6–0, 3–6, 7–5	(Austria) David Pichler	(Sweden) Jonathan Mridha (France) Jules Marie	(Germany) Louis Wessels (Austria) Sandro Kopp (Denmark) Johannes Ingildsen (Germany) Nino Ehrenschneider
August 8	Ystad, Sweden; Clay; M25; Singles and Doubles Draws	(Austria) Sandro Kopp (Netherlands) Mick Veldheer; 6–4, 6–2	(Australia) Ethan Cook (Bulgaria) Leonid Sheyngezikht	(Sweden) Jonathan Mridha (France) Jules Marie	(Germany) Louis Wessels (Austria) Sandro Kopp (Denmark) Johannes Ingildsen (Germany) Nino Ehrenschneider
August 8	Columbus, United States; Hard; M25; Singles and Doubles Draws	(United States) Murphy Cassone; 6–3, 6–0	(Australia) Rinky Hijikata	(United States) Patrick Maloney (United States) Cash Hanzlik	(United States) Cannon Kingsley (United States) Sekou Bangoura (United States) Sam Riffice (United States) Gianni Ross
August 8	Columbus, United States; Hard; M25; Singles and Doubles Draws	(Canada) Justin Boulais (Japan) James Kent Trotter; 6–1, 6–2	(India) Purav Raja (India) Divij Sharan	(United States) Patrick Maloney (United States) Cash Hanzlik	(United States) Cannon Kingsley (United States) Sekou Bangoura (United States) Sam Riffice (United States) Gianni Ross
August 8	Eupen, Belgium; Clay; M15; Singles and Doubles Draws	(United Kingdom) Felix Gill; 6–3, 6–4	(Belgium) Buvaysar Gadamauri	(France) Antoine Hoang (Italy) Tommaso Compagnucci	(Germany) Philip Florig (United States) Toby Kodat (Belgium) Tibo Colson (Netherlands) Sidané Pontjodikromo
August 8	Eupen, Belgium; Clay; M15; Singles and Doubles Draws	(Belgium) Buvaysar Gadamauri (Belgium) Olivier Rojas; 6–7^{(3–7)}, 7–6^{(8–6)}, [10–6]	(Italy) Tommaso Compagnucci (Germany) Noel Larwig	(France) Antoine Hoang (Italy) Tommaso Compagnucci	(Germany) Philip Florig (United States) Toby Kodat (Belgium) Tibo Colson (Netherlands) Sidané Pontjodikromo
August 8	Cairo, Egypt; Clay; M15; Singles and Doubles Draws	(Italy) Luca Tomasetto; 6–2, 7–6^{(8–6)}	(Argentina) Thiago Cigarrán	(Egypt) Mohamed Safwat (South Africa) Alec Beckley	(Italy) Luca Fantini (Argentina) Alex Barrena (Ukraine) Oleksandr Bielinskyi (Hungary) Attila Boros
August 8	Cairo, Egypt; Clay; M15; Singles and Doubles Draws	(Argentina) Alex Barrena (Spain) Bruno Pujol Navarro; 6–2, 6–1	(Argentina) Thiago Cigarrán (Argentina) Sean Hess	(Egypt) Mohamed Safwat (South Africa) Alec Beckley	(Italy) Luca Fantini (Argentina) Alex Barrena (Ukraine) Oleksandr Bielinskyi (Hungary) Attila Boros
August 8	Helsinki, Finland; Clay; M15; Singles and Doubles Draws	(United Kingdom) Charles Broom; 4–6, 6–4, 6–1	(Poland) Filip Peliwo	(France) Térence Atmane (France) Mathieu Scaglia	Bekhan Atlangeriev (Finland) Iiro Vasa (France) Alexandre Aubriot (Finland) Roni Mikael Hietaranta
August 8	Helsinki, Finland; Clay; M15; Singles and Doubles Draws	(Finland) Iiro Vasa (Finland) Eero Vasa; 5–7, 6–4, [10–6]	(Estonia) Johannes Seeman (Estonia) Siim Troost	(France) Térence Atmane (France) Mathieu Scaglia	Bekhan Atlangeriev (Finland) Iiro Vasa (France) Alexandre Aubriot (Finland) Roni Mikael Hietaranta
August 8	Frankfurt, Germany; Clay; M15; Singles and Doubles Draws	(United Kingdom) Jan Choinski; 6–3, 7–6^{(7–4)}	(Spain) Imanol López Morillo	(France) Arthur Reymond (Germany) Kai Wehnelt	(Czech Republic) Jiří Barnat (Serbia) Stefan Popović (Czech Republic) Daniel Pátý (Hungary) Péter Fajta
August 8	Frankfurt, Germany; Clay; M15; Singles and Doubles Draws	(Czech Republic) Jiří Jeníček (Czech Republic) Daniel Pátý; 6–2, 3–6, [10–4]	(Germany) Florian Broska (Austria) Gregor Ramskogler	(France) Arthur Reymond (Germany) Kai Wehnelt	(Czech Republic) Jiří Barnat (Serbia) Stefan Popović (Czech Republic) Daniel Pátý (Hungary) Péter Fajta
August 8	Jakarta, Indonesia; Hard; M15; Singles and Doubles Draws	(Japan) Yuta Shimizu; 6–2, 7–5	(Japan) Ryota Tanuma	(India) Mukund Sasikumar (Japan) Shintaro Imai	(South Korea) Lee Duck-hee (Japan) Yuki Mochizuki (Malaysia) Mitsuki Wei Kang Leong (India) S D Prajwal Dev
August 8	Jakarta, Indonesia; Hard; M15; Singles and Doubles Draws	(Japan) Yuta Shimizu (Japan) Ryota Tanuma; 6–1, 7–6^{(8–6)}	(Indonesia) Nathan Anthony Barki (Indonesia) Christopher Rungkat	(India) Mukund Sasikumar (Japan) Shintaro Imai	(South Korea) Lee Duck-hee (Japan) Yuki Mochizuki (Malaysia) Mitsuki Wei Kang Leong (India) S D Prajwal Dev
August 8	Herzliya, Israel; Hard; M15; Singles and Doubles Draws	(Israel) Ben Patael; 7–6^{(7–2)}, 2–6, 6–3	(Japan) Kazuma Kawachi	(Israel) Orel Kimhi (United Kingdom) Daniel Little	(United Kingdom) Joshua Paris (Israel) Sahar Simon (Israel) Roi Ginat (United Kingdom) Oscar Weightman
August 8	Herzliya, Israel; Hard; M15; Singles and Doubles Draws	(United Kingdom) Joshua Paris (Israel) Ben Patael; 6–4, 6–2	(Israel) Ron Ellouck (Japan) Yuichiro Inui	(Israel) Orel Kimhi (United Kingdom) Daniel Little	(United Kingdom) Joshua Paris (Israel) Sahar Simon (Israel) Roi Ginat (United Kingdom) Oscar Weightman
August 8	Cancún, Mexico; Hard; M15; Singles and Doubles Draws	(France) Jaimee Floyd Angele; 6–3, 7–6^{(7–1)}	(Argentina) Francisco Pini	(Australia) Adam Walton (Argentina) Luciano Doria	(United States) Ishaan Ravichander (United States) Tyler Zink (Mexico) Luis Carlos Álvarez (Italy) Marco Brugnerotto
August 8	Cancún, Mexico; Hard; M15; Singles and Doubles Draws	(Japan) Taisei Ichikawa (Japan) Seita Watanabe; 1–6, 7–6^{(11–9)}, [10–8]	(Australia) Adam Walton (United States) Tyler Zink	(Australia) Adam Walton (Argentina) Luciano Doria	(United States) Ishaan Ravichander (United States) Tyler Zink (Mexico) Luis Carlos Álvarez (Italy) Marco Brugnerotto
August 8	Curtea de Argeș, Romania; Clay; M15; Singles and Doubles Draws	(Argentina) Valerio Aboian; 6–3, 6–3	(Argentina) Juan Pablo Paz	(Romania) Radu Mihai Papoe (Bulgaria) Simon Anthony Ivanov	(Romania) Vlad Andrei Dancu (Romania) Mihai Răzvan Marinescu (Romania) Nicolae Frunză (Ukraine) Illya Beloborodko
August 8	Curtea de Argeș, Romania; Clay; M15; Singles and Doubles Draws	(Ukraine) Illya Beloborodko (Italy) Lorenzo Claverie; 6–2, 6–3	(Romania) Sebastian Gima (Romania) Dan Alexandru Tomescu	(Romania) Radu Mihai Papoe (Bulgaria) Simon Anthony Ivanov	(Romania) Vlad Andrei Dancu (Romania) Mihai Răzvan Marinescu (Romania) Nicolae Frunză (Ukraine) Illya Beloborodko
August 8	Monastir, Tunisia; Hard; M15; Singles and Doubles Draws	(China) Te Rigele; 6–3, 3–6, 7–5	(Estonia) Mark Lajal	(Australia) Matthew Dellavedova (France) Arthur Cazaux	(France) Constantin Bittoun Kouzmine (France) Robin Bertrand (France) Titouan Droguet (China) Mu Tao
August 8	Monastir, Tunisia; Hard; M15; Singles and Doubles Draws	(China) Li Majun (China) Sun Qian; 6–3, 6–1	(Algeria) Mohamed Ali Abibsi (India) Sai Karteek Reddy Ganta	(Australia) Matthew Dellavedova (France) Arthur Cazaux	(France) Constantin Bittoun Kouzmine (France) Robin Bertrand (France) Titouan Droguet (China) Mu Tao
August 15	Koksijde, Belgium; Clay; M25; Singles and Doubles Draws	(Belgium) Raphaël Collignon; 6–1, 6–1	(Argentina) Hernán Casanova	(Brazil) Wilson Leite (Spain) Carlos Sánchez Jover	(Bolivia) Murkel Dellien (Belgium) Arnaud Bovy (Belgium) Gilles-Arnaud Bailly (Argentina) Mariano Navone
August 15	Koksijde, Belgium; Clay; M25; Singles and Doubles Draws	(Argentina) Hernán Casanova (Bolivia) Murkel Dellien; 6–1, 4–6, [10–5]	(Croatia) Zvonimir Babić (Sweden) Simon Freund	(Brazil) Wilson Leite (Spain) Carlos Sánchez Jover	(Bolivia) Murkel Dellien (Belgium) Arnaud Bovy (Belgium) Gilles-Arnaud Bailly (Argentina) Mariano Navone
August 15	Muttenz, Switzerland; Clay; M25; Singles and Doubles Draws	(Czech Republic) Lukáš Rosol; 6–3, 6–4	(France) Maxime Mora	(France) Matteo Martineau (Switzerland) Damien Wenger	(Switzerland) Jan Sebesta (Ukraine) Oleksandr Ovcharenko (Czech Republic) Andrew Paulson (Switzerland) Jérôme Kym
August 15	Muttenz, Switzerland; Clay; M25; Singles and Doubles Draws	(Germany) Kai Wehnelt (Germany) Patrick Zahraj; 6–3, 6–2	(Morocco) Adam Moundir (Germany) Jimmy Yang	(France) Matteo Martineau (Switzerland) Damien Wenger	(Switzerland) Jan Sebesta (Ukraine) Oleksandr Ovcharenko (Czech Republic) Andrew Paulson (Switzerland) Jérôme Kym
August 15	Aldershot, United Kingdom; Hard; M25; Singles and Doubles Draws	(Poland) Filip Peliwo; 6–4, 7–6^{(7–5)}	(Switzerland) Leandro Riedi	(Israel) Edan Leshem (France) Antoine Hoang	(United Kingdom) Max Basing (United Kingdom) Daniel Little (Germany) Robert Strombachs (France) Térence Atmane
August 15	Aldershot, United Kingdom; Hard; M25; Singles and Doubles Draws	(Finland) Eero Vasa (United Kingdom) Mark Whitehouse; 4–6, 7–6^{(7–5)}, [10–6]	(France) Théo Arribagé (France) Luca Sanchez	(Israel) Edan Leshem (France) Antoine Hoang	(United Kingdom) Max Basing (United Kingdom) Daniel Little (Germany) Robert Strombachs (France) Térence Atmane
August 15	Bad Waltersdorf, Austria; Clay; M15; Singles and Doubles Draws	(Germany) Timo Stodder; 6–2, 6–3	(Slovakia) Lukáš Pokorný	(Hungary) Gergely Madarász (Italy) Luca Giacomini	(Italy) Nicolò Pozzani (Germany) Jakob Schnaitter (Germany) Sebastian Prechtel (Italy) Lorenzo Bocchi
August 15	Bad Waltersdorf, Austria; Clay; M15; Singles and Doubles Draws	(Slovakia) Lukáš Pokorný (Germany) Timo Stodder; 6–4, 6–2	(Slovenia) Jan Dimitrijevič (Slovenia) Maj Premzl	(Hungary) Gergely Madarász (Italy) Luca Giacomini	(Italy) Nicolò Pozzani (Germany) Jakob Schnaitter (Germany) Sebastian Prechtel (Italy) Lorenzo Bocchi
August 15	Recife, Brazil; Clay (indoor); M15; Singles and Doubles Draws	(Brazil) Eduardo Ribeiro; 3–6, 6–3, 6–4	(Brazil) João Lucas Reis da Silva	(Brazil) João Victor Couto Loureiro (Uruguay) Ignacio Carou	(Brazil) Orlando Luz (Brazil) Pedro Sakamoto (Brazil) Fernando Yamacita (Argentina) Ezequiel Simonit
August 15	Recife, Brazil; Clay (indoor); M15; Singles and Doubles Draws	(Brazil) Luís Britto (Brazil) Marcelo Zormann; 6–4, 6–4	(Brazil) Gabriel Pascotto Tumasonis (Brazil) Fernando Yamacita	(Brazil) João Victor Couto Loureiro (Uruguay) Ignacio Carou	(Brazil) Orlando Luz (Brazil) Pedro Sakamoto (Brazil) Fernando Yamacita (Argentina) Ezequiel Simonit
August 15	Cairo, Egypt; Clay; M15; Singles and Doubles Draws	(Spain) José Francisco Vidal Azorín; 6–3, 7–5	(Spain) Bruno Pujol Navarro	(Argentina) Fermín Tenti (Italy) Giuseppe Tresca	(Italy) Luca Tomasetto (Argentina) Alex Barrena (Argentina) Leonardo Aboian (Ukraine) Oleksandr Bielinskyi
August 15	Cairo, Egypt; Clay; M15; Singles and Doubles Draws	(Egypt) Amr Elsayed (Egypt) Karim-Mohamed Maamoun; 6–1, 6–4	(Argentina) Leonardo Aboian (Spain) Bruno Pujol Navarro	(Argentina) Fermín Tenti (Italy) Giuseppe Tresca	(Italy) Luca Tomasetto (Argentina) Alex Barrena (Argentina) Leonardo Aboian (Ukraine) Oleksandr Bielinskyi
August 15	Überlingen, Germany; Clay; M15; Singles and Doubles Draws	(Germany) Lucas Gerch; 6–3, 6–1	(Germany) Peter Heller	(Serbia) Stefan Popović (Germany) Tim Handel	(Serbia) Viktor Jović (Czech Republic) Filip Duda (Germany) Christoph Negritu (Germany) Max Hans Rehberg
August 15	Überlingen, Germany; Clay; M15; Singles and Doubles Draws	(Czech Republic) Adam Jurajda (Czech Republic) Daniel Siniakov; 6–4, 7–5	(Germany) Tim Handel (Germany) Peter Heller	(Serbia) Stefan Popović (Germany) Tim Handel	(Serbia) Viktor Jović (Czech Republic) Filip Duda (Germany) Christoph Negritu (Germany) Max Hans Rehberg
August 15	Jakarta, Indonesia; Hard; M15; Singles and Doubles Draws	(Japan) Shintaro Imai; 6–3, 6–3	(India) Mukund Sasikumar	(Japan) Yuki Mochizuki (Indonesia) Fitriadi M Rifqi	(Australia) Moerani Bouzige (New Zealand) Ajeet Rai (Japan) Yusuke Takahashi (India) S D Prajwal Dev
August 15	Jakarta, Indonesia; Hard; M15; Singles and Doubles Draws	(India) Parikshit Somani (India) Manish Sureshkumar; 7–6^{(7–3)}, 7–6^{(7–4)}	(Japan) Issei Okamura (Japan) Kento Takeuchi	(Japan) Yuki Mochizuki (Indonesia) Fitriadi M Rifqi	(Australia) Moerani Bouzige (New Zealand) Ajeet Rai (Japan) Yusuke Takahashi (India) S D Prajwal Dev
August 15	Cancún, Mexico; Hard; M15; Singles and Doubles Draws	(Peru) Jorge Panta; 1–6, 6–3, 6–4	(Australia) Adam Walton	(France) Jaimee Floyd Angele (Moldova) Alexander Cozbinov	(Ecuador) Andrés Andrade (Mexico) Alan Fernando Rubio Fierros (India) Aditya Vishal Balsekar (Italy) Marco Brugnerotto
August 15	Cancún, Mexico; Hard; M15; Singles and Doubles Draws	(Peru) Ignacio Buse (Peru) Jorge Panta; 6–2, 7–6^{(7–5)}	(Italy) Marco Brugnerotto (Moldova) Alexander Cozbinov	(France) Jaimee Floyd Angele (Moldova) Alexander Cozbinov	(Ecuador) Andrés Andrade (Mexico) Alan Fernando Rubio Fierros (India) Aditya Vishal Balsekar (Italy) Marco Brugnerotto
August 15	Eindhoven, Netherlands; Clay; M15; Singles and Doubles Draws	(Argentina) Juan Bautista Otegui; 6–1, 4–6, 6–4	(France) Arthur Reymond	(Netherlands) Max Houkes (Austria) David Pichler	(France) Thomas Deschamps (France) Nathan Seateun (Spain) Daniel Mérida (Netherlands) Michiel de Krom
August 15	Eindhoven, Netherlands; Clay; M15; Singles and Doubles Draws	(Netherlands) Michiel de Krom (Netherlands) Ryan Nijboer; 6–4, 6–1	(Netherlands) Thijmen Loof (Netherlands) Fons van Sambeek	(Netherlands) Max Houkes (Austria) David Pichler	(France) Thomas Deschamps (France) Nathan Seateun (Spain) Daniel Mérida (Netherlands) Michiel de Krom
August 15	Craiova, Romania; Clay; M15; Singles and Doubles Draws	(Romania) Cezar Crețu; 6–2, 2–6, 6–2	(Romania) Nicholas David Ionel	(Ukraine) Illya Beloborodko (Argentina) Juan Pablo Paz	(Italy) Simone Roncalli (Moldova) Ilya Snițari (Romania) Dan Alexandru Tomescu (Romania) Călin Manda
August 15	Craiova, Romania; Clay; M15; Singles and Doubles Draws	(Italy) Lorenzo Claverie (Romania) Vladimir Filip; 6–1, 3–6, [10–2]	(Romania) Vasile Antonescu (Romania) Andrei Cuceu	(Ukraine) Illya Beloborodko (Argentina) Juan Pablo Paz	(Italy) Simone Roncalli (Moldova) Ilya Snițari (Romania) Dan Alexandru Tomescu (Romania) Călin Manda
August 15	Anseong, South Korea; Clay; M15; Singles and Doubles Draws	(South Korea) Kim Cheong-eui; 3–6, 6–4, 6–4	(Japan) Sora Fukuda	(South Korea) Kim Jae-hwan (Australia) Thomas Fancutt	(South Korea) Shin San-hui (India) Adil Kalyanpur (Japan) Takuto Niki (South Korea) Lee Jea-moon
August 15	Anseong, South Korea; Clay; M15; Singles and Doubles Draws	(South Korea) Kim Cheong-eui (South Korea) Lee Jea-moon; 6–3, 6–1	(Australia) Timothy Gray (Australia) Thomas Pavlekovich Smith	(South Korea) Kim Jae-hwan (Australia) Thomas Fancutt	(South Korea) Shin San-hui (India) Adil Kalyanpur (Japan) Takuto Niki (South Korea) Lee Jea-moon
August 15	Malmö, Sweden; Clay; M15; Singles and Doubles Draws	(Germany) Nino Ehrenschneider; 6–3, 7–6^{(7–1)}	(Austria) Sandro Kopp	(Sweden) Filip Bergevi (Netherlands) Mick Veldheer	(Sweden) Jonathan Mridha (Sweden) Karl Friberg (Poland) Maciej Rajski (France) Alexandre Aubriot
August 15	Malmö, Sweden; Clay; M15; Singles and Doubles Draws	(Czech Republic) Patrik Rikl (Czech Republic) Matěj Vocel; 6–4, 3–6, [10–7]	(Sweden) Filip Bergevi (Netherlands) Mick Veldheer	(Sweden) Filip Bergevi (Netherlands) Mick Veldheer	(Sweden) Jonathan Mridha (Sweden) Karl Friberg (Poland) Maciej Rajski (France) Alexandre Aubriot
August 15	Monastir, Tunisia; Hard; M15; Singles and Doubles Draws	(North Macedonia) Kalin Ivanovski; 4–6, 6–4, 6–1	(Bosnia and Herzegovina) Aziz Kijametović	(South Africa) Kris van Wyk (France) Cyril Vandermeersch	(France) Robin Bertrand (Ivory Coast) Eliakim Coulibaly (Bulgaria) Nikolay Nedelchev (China) Sun Qian
August 15	Monastir, Tunisia; Hard; M15; Singles and Doubles Draws	(France) Robin Bertrand (France) Cyril Vandermeersch; 6–4, 6–4	(China) Tang Sheng (China) Zheng Baoluo	(South Africa) Kris van Wyk (France) Cyril Vandermeersch	(France) Robin Bertrand (Ivory Coast) Eliakim Coulibaly (Bulgaria) Nikolay Nedelchev (China) Sun Qian
August 15	Memphis, United States; Hard; M15; Singles and Doubles Draws	(United States) Garrett Johns; 6–2, 6–0	(Japan) Shunsuke Mitsui	(United States) Sam Riffice (United States) Ezekiel Clark	(Germany) Tim Sandkaulen (United States) Alex Michelsen (United States) Thai-Son Kwiatkowski (China) Fnu Nidunjianzan
August 15	Memphis, United States; Hard; M15; Singles and Doubles Draws	(United Kingdom) Millen Hurrion (New Zealand) Finn Reynolds; 6–0, 6–1	(United States) Alex Michelsen (United States) Cooper Williams	(United States) Sam Riffice (United States) Ezekiel Clark	(Germany) Tim Sandkaulen (United States) Alex Michelsen (United States) Thai-Son Kwiatkowski (China) Fnu Nidunjianzan
August 22	Lesa, Italy; Clay; M25; Singles and Doubles Draws	(Italy) Gianmarco Ferrari; 6–2, 6–3	(Italy) Federico Arnaboldi	(Argentina) Juan Ignacio Galarza (Italy) Gabriele Piraino	(Denmark) Johannes Ingildsen (Italy) Federico Campana (Italy) Luca Castagnola (Argentina) Mariano Kestelboim
August 22	Lesa, Italy; Clay; M25; Singles and Doubles Draws	(Denmark) August Holmgren (Denmark) Johannes Ingildsen; 6–1, 6–4	(Italy) Federico Bondioli (Italy) Filippo Romano	(Argentina) Juan Ignacio Galarza (Italy) Gabriele Piraino	(Denmark) Johannes Ingildsen (Italy) Federico Campana (Italy) Luca Castagnola (Argentina) Mariano Kestelboim
August 22	Oldenzaal, Netherlands; Clay; M25; Singles and Doubles Draws	(Netherlands) Max Houkes; 7–6^{(7–3)}, 6–2	(Germany) Jeremy Jahn	(Netherlands) Michiel de Krom (Spain) Daniel Mérida	(Netherlands) Elgin Khoeblal (France) Jules Marie (Netherlands) Jarno Jans (France) Mathys Erhard
August 22	Oldenzaal, Netherlands; Clay; M25; Singles and Doubles Draws	(Netherlands) Michiel de Krom (Netherlands) Ryan Nijboer; 6–1, 5–7, [10–6]	(Netherlands) Brian Bozemoj (Netherlands) Jarno Jans	(Netherlands) Michiel de Krom (Spain) Daniel Mérida	(Netherlands) Elgin Khoeblal (France) Jules Marie (Netherlands) Jarno Jans (France) Mathys Erhard
August 22	Poznań, Poland; Clay; M25; Singles and Doubles Draws	(Argentina) Valerio Aboian; 6–3, 6–4	(Czech Republic) Patrik Rikl	(Germany) Rudolf Molleker (Poland) Olaf Pieczkowski	(Poland) Maciej Rajski (Ukraine) Vladyslav Orlov (Poland) Piotr Matuszewski (Ukraine) Georgii Kravchenko
August 22	Poznań, Poland; Clay; M25; Singles and Doubles Draws	(Australia) Jason Taylor (Australia) Brandon Walkin; 7–5, 7–5	(Poland) Michał Dembek (Ukraine) Georgii Kravchenko	(Germany) Rudolf Molleker (Poland) Olaf Pieczkowski	(Poland) Maciej Rajski (Ukraine) Vladyslav Orlov (Poland) Piotr Matuszewski (Ukraine) Georgii Kravchenko
August 22	Santander, Spain; Clay; M25; Singles and Doubles Draws	(France) Titouan Droguet; 7–6^{(11–9)}, 6–0	(Brazil) Oscar José Gutierrez	(Spain) Alejandro Manzanera Pertusa (Spain) Íñigo Cervantes	(Spain) Pablo Llamas Ruiz (Spain) Max Alcalá Gurri (Spain) Álvaro López San Martín (Spain) Carlos Sánchez Jover
August 22	Santander, Spain; Clay; M25; Singles and Doubles Draws	(Spain) Íñigo Cervantes (Spain) Sergi Pérez Contri; 6–3, 6–4	(France) Titouan Droguet (France) Grégoire Jacq	(Spain) Alejandro Manzanera Pertusa (Spain) Íñigo Cervantes	(Spain) Pablo Llamas Ruiz (Spain) Max Alcalá Gurri (Spain) Álvaro López San Martín (Spain) Carlos Sánchez Jover
August 22	Caslano, Switzerland; Clay; M25; Singles and Doubles Draws	(Germany) Elmar Ejupovic; 7–5, 4–6, 6–3	(Switzerland) Damien Wenger	(Switzerland) Mika Brunold (Tunisia) Moez Echargui	(Switzerland) Nicolás Parizzia (Germany) Tim Handel (Switzerland) Rémy Bertola (Italy) Federico Iannaccone
August 22	Caslano, Switzerland; Clay; M25; Singles and Doubles Draws	(Italy) Enrico Dalla Valle (Italy) Julian Ocleppo; 6–7^{(12–14)}, 6–2, [10–6]	(Germany) Kai Wehnelt (Germany) Patrick Zahraj	(Switzerland) Mika Brunold (Tunisia) Moez Echargui	(Switzerland) Nicolás Parizzia (Germany) Tim Handel (Switzerland) Rémy Bertola (Italy) Federico Iannaccone
August 22	Roehampton, United Kingdom; Hard; M25; Singles and Doubles Draws	(France) Antoine Hoang; 6–4, 6–4	(United Kingdom) Giles Hussey	(United Kingdom) Max Basing (Israel) Edan Leshem	(United Kingdom) Harry Wendelken (Spain) Adrià Soriano Barrera (Germany) Robert Strombachs (Israel) Sahar Simon
August 22	Roehampton, United Kingdom; Hard; M25; Singles and Doubles Draws	(United Kingdom) Giles Hussey (United Kingdom) Joe Tyler; 7–5, 6–3	(United Kingdom) Arthur Fery (United Kingdom) Mark Whitehouse	(United Kingdom) Max Basing (Israel) Edan Leshem	(United Kingdom) Harry Wendelken (Spain) Adrià Soriano Barrera (Germany) Robert Strombachs (Israel) Sahar Simon
August 22	Bad Waltersdorf, Austria; Clay; M15; Singles and Doubles Draws	(Germany) Peter Heller; 6–1, 1–6, 6–4	(Italy) Tommaso Compagnucci	(Italy) Lorenzo Bresciani (Italy) Lorenzo Bocchi	(Czech Republic) Yvo Panák (Italy) Stefano Reitano (Austria) Marko Andrejic (Austria) Lukas Krainer
August 22	Bad Waltersdorf, Austria; Clay; M15; Singles and Doubles Draws	(Germany) Peter Heller (Austria) David Pichler; 6–2, 6–2	(Italy) Tommaso Compagnucci (Italy) Stefano Reitano	(Italy) Lorenzo Bresciani (Italy) Lorenzo Bocchi	(Czech Republic) Yvo Panák (Italy) Stefano Reitano (Austria) Marko Andrejic (Austria) Lukas Krainer
August 22	Lambermont, Belgium; Clay; M15; Singles and Doubles Draws	(Belgium) Simon Beaupain; 7–5, 0–6, 6–4	(Netherlands) Stijn Slump	(Belgium) Gauthier Onclin (Germany) Marcel Zielinski	(France) Thomas Deschamps (France) Arthur Reymond (United States) Jakub Wojcik (Belgium) Gilles-Arnaud Bailly
August 22	Lambermont, Belgium; Clay; M15; Singles and Doubles Draws	(Australia) Ethan Cook (Sweden) Karl Friberg; 6–4, 6–3	(Australia) Kody Pearson (United States) Jakub Wojcik	(Belgium) Gauthier Onclin (Germany) Marcel Zielinski	(France) Thomas Deschamps (France) Arthur Reymond (United States) Jakub Wojcik (Belgium) Gilles-Arnaud Bailly
August 22	Brasília, Brazil; Clay (indoor); M15; Singles and Doubles Draws	(Brazil) Eduardo Ribeiro; 6–2, 6–2	(Argentina) Lorenzo Gagliardo	(Argentina) Matías Franco Descotte (Brazil) Orlando Luz	(Brazil) Nicolas Zanellato (Brazil) Marcelo Zormann (Brazil) João Victor Couto Loureiro (Brazil) Fernando Yamacita
August 22	Brasília, Brazil; Clay (indoor); M15; Singles and Doubles Draws	(Brazil) Eduardo Ribeiro (Brazil) Gabriel Roveri Sidney; 6–3, 6–7^{(2–7)}, [10–8]	(Brazil) Luís Britto (Brazil) Marcelo Zormann	(Argentina) Matías Franco Descotte (Brazil) Orlando Luz	(Brazil) Nicolas Zanellato (Brazil) Marcelo Zormann (Brazil) João Victor Couto Loureiro (Brazil) Fernando Yamacita
August 22	Cairo, Egypt; Clay; M15; Singles and Doubles Draws	(Argentina) Alex Barrena; 7–6^{(7–4)}, 6–1	(Egypt) Mohamed Safwat	(Brazil) Elio José Ribeiro Lago (Spain) José Francisco Vidal Azorín	(Italy) Gabriele Pennaforti (Sweden) Leo Borg (Argentina) Leonardo Aboian (Spain) David Pérez Sanz
August 22	Cairo, Egypt; Clay; M15; Singles and Doubles Draws	(Egypt) Amr Elsayed (Egypt) Mohamed Safwat; 6–3, 0–6, [10–6]	(Argentina) Leonardo Aboian (Argentina) Fermín Tenti	(Brazil) Elio José Ribeiro Lago (Spain) José Francisco Vidal Azorín	(Italy) Gabriele Pennaforti (Sweden) Leo Borg (Argentina) Leonardo Aboian (Spain) David Pérez Sanz
August 22	Trier, Germany; Clay; M15; Singles and Doubles Draws	(Germany) Tom Gentzsch; 7–6^{(7–3)}, 7–6^{(7–4)}	(Czech Republic) Jiří Barnat	(France) Quentin Folliot (Germany) Dominik Böhler	(Portugal) Jaime Faria (Germany) Christoph Negritu (United Kingdom) Daniel Little (Ukraine) Eric Vanshelboim
August 22	Trier, Germany; Clay; M15; Singles and Doubles Draws	(Australia) James Frawley (Germany) Christoph Negritu; 6–3, 6–4	(Germany) Tom Gentzsch (Germany) Adrian Oetzbach	(France) Quentin Folliot (Germany) Dominik Böhler	(Portugal) Jaime Faria (Germany) Christoph Negritu (United Kingdom) Daniel Little (Ukraine) Eric Vanshelboim
August 22	Cancún, Mexico; Hard; M15; Singles and Doubles Draws	(Australia) Adam Walton; 7–6^{(7–3)}, 2–6, 6–3	(Ecuador) Andrés Andrade	(Colombia) Alejandro Hoyos Franco (Peru) Ignacio Buse	(Moldova) Alexander Cozbinov (Argentina) Juan Manuel La Serna (Peru) Jorge Panta (Australia) Bernard Tomic
August 22	Cancún, Mexico; Hard; M15; Singles and Doubles Draws	(United States) Andrew Rogers (Australia) Adam Walton; 6–2, 6–2	(United Kingdom) Blu Baker (Japan) Kosuke Ogura	(Colombia) Alejandro Hoyos Franco (Peru) Ignacio Buse	(Moldova) Alexander Cozbinov (Argentina) Juan Manuel La Serna (Peru) Jorge Panta (Australia) Bernard Tomic
August 22	Celje, Slovenia; Clay; M15; Singles and Doubles Draws	(Croatia) Roko Horvat; 6–3, 3–6, 6–1	(Croatia) Admir Kalender	(Italy) Daniele Capecchi (Croatia) Domagoj Bilješko	(Argentina) Lautaro Agustín Falabella (Italy) Luigi Sorrentino (Czech Republic) Adam Jurajda (Hungary) Zsombor Velcz
August 22	Celje, Slovenia; Clay; M15; Singles and Doubles Draws	(Slovenia) Matic Dimic (Slovenia) Mike Urbanija; 6–2, 6–7^{(5–7)}, [10–6]	(Poland) Szymon Kielan (Poland) Yann Wójcik	(Italy) Daniele Capecchi (Croatia) Domagoj Bilješko	(Argentina) Lautaro Agustín Falabella (Italy) Luigi Sorrentino (Czech Republic) Adam Jurajda (Hungary) Zsombor Velcz
August 22	Changwon, South Korea; Hard; M15; Singles and Doubles Draws	(South Korea) Lee Jea-moon; 6–4, 6–4	(New Zealand) Ajeet Rai	(Japan) Ryuki Matsuda (Japan) Yuta Kawahashi	(Japan) Kazuki Nishiwaki (Australia) Thomas Fancutt (South Korea) Jeong Yeong-seok (Japan) Issei Okamura
August 22	Changwon, South Korea; Hard; M15; Singles and Doubles Draws	(Australia) Thomas Fancutt (New Zealand) Ajeet Rai; 5–7, 6–4, [10–8]	(South Korea) Jeong Yeong-seok (South Korea) Lee Jea-moon	(Japan) Ryuki Matsuda (Japan) Yuta Kawahashi	(Japan) Kazuki Nishiwaki (Australia) Thomas Fancutt (South Korea) Jeong Yeong-seok (Japan) Issei Okamura
August 22	Monastir, Tunisia; Hard; M15; Singles and Doubles Draws	(Ivory Coast) Eliakim Coulibaly; 7–5, 6–4	(Australia) Matthew Dellavedova	(France) Vivien Versier (Jordan) Abedallah Shelbayh	(India) Niki Kaliyanda Poonacha (North Macedonia) Kalin Ivanovski; Nikolay Vylegzhanin (United States) Michael Zhu
August 22	Monastir, Tunisia; Hard; M15; Singles and Doubles Draws	(Tunisia) Anis Ghorbel (Tunisia) Aziz Ouakaa; 6–1, 6–1	(China) Tang Sheng (China) Zheng Baoluo	(France) Vivien Versier (Jordan) Abedallah Shelbayh	(India) Niki Kaliyanda Poonacha (North Macedonia) Kalin Ivanovski; Nikolay Vylegzhanin (United States) Michael Zhu
August 29	Szabolcsveresmart, Hungary; Clay; M25; Singles and Doubles Draws	(Czech Republic) Michael Vrbenský; 6–1, 7–6^{(8–6)}	(Sweden) Dragoș Nicolae Mădăraș	(Czech Republic) Andrew Paulson (Hungary) Gergely Madarász	(Brazil) Wilson Leite (Hungary) Péter Fajta (Romania) Dragoș Dima (Romania) Bogdan Ionuț Apostol
August 29	Szabolcsveresmart, Hungary; Clay; M25; Singles and Doubles Draws	(Czech Republic) Andrew Paulson (Czech Republic) Michael Vrbenský; 6–3, 3–6, [10–8]	(Ukraine) Georgii Kravchenko (Czech Republic) Petr Nouza	(Czech Republic) Andrew Paulson (Hungary) Gergely Madarász	(Brazil) Wilson Leite (Hungary) Péter Fajta (Romania) Dragoș Dima (Romania) Bogdan Ionuț Apostol
August 29	Sapporo, Japan; Hard; M25; Singles and Doubles Draws	(Japan) Rio Noguchi; 4–6, 7–5, 6–2	(Japan) Shuichi Sekiguchi	(Japan) Ryota Tanuma (Japan) Yuki Mochizuki	(Japan) Taketo Takamisawa (Japan) Tatsuma Ito (Japan) Yamato Sueoka (Japan) Daisuke Sumizawa
August 29	Sapporo, Japan; Hard; M25; Singles and Doubles Draws	(Japan) Takuto Niki (Japan) Takeru Yuzuki; 3–6, 6–4, [10–8]	(Japan) Rimpei Kawakami (Japan) Naoki Tajima	(Japan) Ryota Tanuma (Japan) Yuki Mochizuki	(Japan) Taketo Takamisawa (Japan) Tatsuma Ito (Japan) Yamato Sueoka (Japan) Daisuke Sumizawa
August 29	Setúbal, Portugal; Hard; M25; Singles and Doubles Draws	(Spain) Adrià Soriano Barrera; 7–6^{(9–7)}, 6–3	(Switzerland) Jérôme Kym	(France) Sascha Gueymard Wayenburg (United States) Alfredo Perez	(France) Gabriel Debru (Portugal) Jaime Faria (Portugal) Henrique Rocha (Israel) Edan Leshem
August 29	Setúbal, Portugal; Hard; M25; Singles and Doubles Draws	(Portugal) Fábio Coelho (Portugal) Jaime Faria; 7–6^{(7–4)}, 6–3	(Finland) Eero Vasa (United Kingdom) Mark Whitehouse	(France) Sascha Gueymard Wayenburg (United States) Alfredo Perez	(France) Gabriel Debru (Portugal) Jaime Faria (Portugal) Henrique Rocha (Israel) Edan Leshem
August 29	Maribor, Slovenia; Clay; M25; Singles and Doubles Draws	(Argentina) Hernán Casanova; 6–4, 6–3	(Bolivia) Murkel Dellien	(Denmark) August Holmgren (Italy) Daniele Capecchi	(Czech Republic) Martin Krumich (Italy) Luigi Sorrentino (Hungary) Mátyás Füle; Matvey Minin
August 29	Maribor, Slovenia; Clay; M25; Singles and Doubles Draws	(Croatia) Domagoj Bilješko; Kirill Kivattsev; 6–3, 6–7^{(0–7)}, [11–9]	(Croatia) Mili Poljičak (Croatia) Antonio Šančić	(Denmark) August Holmgren (Italy) Daniele Capecchi	(Czech Republic) Martin Krumich (Italy) Luigi Sorrentino (Hungary) Mátyás Füle; Matvey Minin
August 29	Oviedo, Spain; Clay; M25; Singles and Doubles Draws	(Spain) Javier Barranco Cosano; 7–5, 7–5	(Spain) Carlos Sánchez Jover	(Spain) Oriol Roca Batalla (Spain) Álvaro López San Martín	(Spain) Sergi Pérez Contri (Spain) Imanol López Morillo (Spain) Benjamín Winter López (Lithuania) Vilius Gaubas
August 29	Oviedo, Spain; Clay; M25; Singles and Doubles Draws	(Spain) Íñigo Cervantes (Spain) Oriol Roca Batalla; 6–2, 6–2	(Spain) Álvaro López San Martín (Spain) Carlos Sánchez Jover	(Spain) Oriol Roca Batalla (Spain) Álvaro López San Martín	(Spain) Sergi Pérez Contri (Spain) Imanol López Morillo (Spain) Benjamín Winter López (Lithuania) Vilius Gaubas
August 29	Sierre, Switzerland; Clay; M25; Singles and Doubles Draws	(Switzerland) Rémy Bertola; 6–7^{(2–7)}, 7–6^{(9–7)}, 6–4	(Austria) Maximilian Neuchrist	(Canada) Steven Diez (Germany) Patrick Zahraj	(Switzerland) Mirko Martinez (Switzerland) Nicolás Parizzia (Switzerland) Mika Brunold (Switzerland) Louroi Martinez
August 29	Sierre, Switzerland; Clay; M25; Singles and Doubles Draws	(Switzerland) Damien Wenger (Germany) Patrick Zahraj; 6–1, 6–7^{(1–7)}, [10–3]	(Switzerland) Rémy Bertola (Switzerland) Jakub Paul	(Canada) Steven Diez (Germany) Patrick Zahraj	(Switzerland) Mirko Martinez (Switzerland) Nicolás Parizzia (Switzerland) Mika Brunold (Switzerland) Louroi Martinez
August 29	Cairo, Egypt; Clay; M15; Singles and Doubles Draws	(Argentina) Leonardo Aboian; 7–6^{(7–4)}, 6–2	(Egypt) Mohamed Safwat	(Spain) José Francisco Vidal Azorín (Italy) Giuseppe Tresca	(Italy) Stefano Battaglino (Egypt) Amr Elsayed (Sweden) Leo Borg (Italy) Fabrizio Andaloro
August 29	Cairo, Egypt; Clay; M15; Singles and Doubles Draws	(Egypt) Akram El Sallaly (Egypt) Mohamed Safwat; 6–2, 6–4	(Italy) Stefano Battaglino (Italy) Lorenzo Rottoli	(Spain) José Francisco Vidal Azorín (Italy) Giuseppe Tresca	(Italy) Stefano Battaglino (Egypt) Amr Elsayed (Sweden) Leo Borg (Italy) Fabrizio Andaloro
August 29	Allershausen, Germany; Clay; M15; Singles and Doubles Draws	(Czech Republic) Jakub Menšík; 7–5, 3–6, 6–1	(Germany) Peter Heller	(Austria) Sandro Kopp (Syria) Hazem Naw	(France) Alexis Gautier (Germany) Florian Broska (Germany) Tim Handel (Germany) Timo Stodder
August 29	Allershausen, Germany; Clay; M15; Singles and Doubles Draws	(Australia) James Frawley (Germany) Christoph Negritu; 6–4, 2–6, [10–5]	(Latvia) Miķelis Lībietis (Germany) Timo Stodder	(Austria) Sandro Kopp (Syria) Hazem Naw	(France) Alexis Gautier (Germany) Florian Broska (Germany) Tim Handel (Germany) Timo Stodder
August 29	Pescara, Italy; Clay; M15; Singles and Doubles Draws	(Italy) Marcello Serafini; 6–3, 7–5	(Italy) Julian Ocleppo	(Argentina) Juan Bautista Otegui (Italy) Gianluca Di Nicola	(Italy) Andrea Picchione (Italy) Simone Roncalli (Italy) Lorenzo Sciahbasi (Italy) Luca Castagnola
August 29	Pescara, Italy; Clay; M15; Singles and Doubles Draws	(Italy) Giorgio Ricca (Italy) Marcello Serafini; 6–3, 6–1	(Argentina) Juan Bautista Otegui (Greece) Stefanos Sakellaridis	(Argentina) Juan Bautista Otegui (Italy) Gianluca Di Nicola	(Italy) Andrea Picchione (Italy) Simone Roncalli (Italy) Lorenzo Sciahbasi (Italy) Luca Castagnola
August 29	Haren, Netherlands; Clay; M15; Singles and Doubles Draws	(Netherlands) Max Houkes; 7–5, 0–3, ret.	(Netherlands) Alec Deckers	(Netherlands) Michiel de Krom (Germany) Dominik Böhler	(Argentina) Matías Zukas (Argentina) Ignacio Monzón (Germany) Rafael Giotis (Netherlands) Jarno Jans
August 29	Haren, Netherlands; Clay; M15; Singles and Doubles Draws	(United Kingdom) Giles Hussey (Estonia) Kristjan Tamm; 6–3, 6–1	(Germany) Edison Ambarzumjan (Germany) Aaron James Williams	(Netherlands) Michiel de Krom (Germany) Dominik Böhler	(Argentina) Matías Zukas (Argentina) Ignacio Monzón (Germany) Rafael Giotis (Netherlands) Jarno Jans
August 29	Daegu, South Korea; Hard; M15; Singles and Doubles Draws	(South Korea) Park Ui-sung; 6–3, 6–4	(South Korea) Kim Cheong-eui	(South Korea) Lee Duck-hee (Thailand) Palaphoom Kovapitukted	(South Korea) Kim Geun-jun (Japan) Yuta Kawahashi (South Korea) Shin San-hui (Japan) Kazuma Kawachi
August 29	Daegu, South Korea; Hard; M15; Singles and Doubles Draws	(South Korea) Kim Cheong-eui (South Korea) Lee Jea-moon; 6–7^{(7–9)}, 6–4, [10–8]	(India) Adil Kalyanpur (Thailand) Palaphoom Kovapitukted	(South Korea) Lee Duck-hee (Thailand) Palaphoom Kovapitukted	(South Korea) Kim Geun-jun (Japan) Yuta Kawahashi (South Korea) Shin San-hui (Japan) Kazuma Kawachi
August 29	Monastir, Tunisia; Hard; M15; Singles and Doubles Draws	(Ivory Coast) Eliakim Coulibaly; 6–2, 6–4	(France) Constantin Bittoun Kouzmine	(Tunisia) Aziz Dougaz (India) Rishab Agarwal	(United States) Colin Markes (Australia) Matthew Dellavedova (New Zealand) Kiranpal Pannu (Luxembourg) Alex Knaff
August 29	Monastir, Tunisia; Hard; M15; Singles and Doubles Draws	(Tunisia) Anis Ghorbel (Tunisia) Aziz Ouakaa; 6–4, 4–6, [10–6]	(China) Li Majun (China) Tang Sheng	(Tunisia) Aziz Dougaz (India) Rishab Agarwal	(United States) Colin Markes (Australia) Matthew Dellavedova (New Zealand) Kiranpal Pannu (Luxembourg) Alex Knaff

=== September ===
Week of	Tournament	Winner	Runners-up	Semifinalists	Quarterfinalists
September 5	Cairo, Egypt; Clay; M25; Singles and Doubles Draws	(Argentina) Leonardo Aboian; 6–3, 6–4	(Sweden) Leo Borg	(Argentina) Luciano Emanuel Ambrogi (Egypt) Amr Elsayed	(South Africa) Alec Beckley (Italy) Marco Miceli (Argentina) Santiago de la Fuente (Spain) José Francisco Vidal Azorín
September 5	Cairo, Egypt; Clay; M25; Singles and Doubles Draws	(Argentina) Leonardo Aboian (Argentina) Santiago de la Fuente; 6–4, 6–4	(Switzerland) Rémy Bertola (Italy) Lorenzo Rottoli	(Argentina) Luciano Emanuel Ambrogi (Egypt) Amr Elsayed	(South Africa) Alec Beckley (Italy) Marco Miceli (Argentina) Santiago de la Fuente (Spain) José Francisco Vidal Azorín
September 5	Bagnères-de-Bigorre, France; Hard; M25+H; Singles and Doubles Draws	(Belgium) Joris De Loore; 6–3, 6–0	(Estonia) Mark Lajal	(Canada) Steven Diez (France) Antoine Hoang	(France) Dan Added (France) Adrien Gobat (France) Jules Marie (Argentina) Federico Agustín Gómez
September 5	Bagnères-de-Bigorre, France; Hard; M25+H; Singles and Doubles Draws	(Belgium) Joris De Loore (Belgium) Yannick Mertens; 7–6^{(7–3)}, 6–7^{(6–8)}, [10–6]	(United Kingdom) James MacKinlay (United Kingdom) Marcus Willis	(Canada) Steven Diez (France) Antoine Hoang	(France) Dan Added (France) Adrien Gobat (France) Jules Marie (Argentina) Federico Agustín Gómez
September 5	Sapporo, Japan; Hard; M25; Singles and Doubles Draws	(Japan) Rio Noguchi; 6–1, 4–0, ret.	(Japan) Tatsuma Ito	(Japan) Keisuke Saitoh (Japan) Shintaro Imai	(Japan) Yuki Mochizuki (Japan) Ryota Tanuma (Japan) Ryusuke Horiuchi (Japan) Shuichi Sekiguchi
September 5	Sapporo, Japan; Hard; M25; Singles and Doubles Draws	(Japan) Yuhei Kono (Japan) Yusuke Kusuhara; 7–5, 4–6, [10–6]	(Japan) Kokoro Isomura (Japan) Yamato Sueoka	(Japan) Keisuke Saitoh (Japan) Shintaro Imai	(Japan) Yuki Mochizuki (Japan) Ryota Tanuma (Japan) Ryusuke Horiuchi (Japan) Shuichi Sekiguchi
September 5	Sintra, Portugal; Hard; M25; Singles and Doubles Draws	(India) Mukund Sasikumar; 7–6^{(8–6)}, 3–6, 6–0	(Portugal) Duarte Vale	(Spain) Mario González Fernández (Portugal) Daniel Rodrigues	(Monaco) Lucas Catarina (United Kingdom) Arthur Fery (China) Sun Fajing (Spain) Adrià Soriano Barrera
September 5	Sintra, Portugal; Hard; M25; Singles and Doubles Draws	(Denmark) Benjamin Hannestad (United Kingdom) Harry Wendelken; 4–6, 6–1, [10–7]	(Chile) Diego Fernández Flores (Spain) Adrià Soriano Barrera	(Spain) Mario González Fernández (Portugal) Daniel Rodrigues	(Monaco) Lucas Catarina (United Kingdom) Arthur Fery (China) Sun Fajing (Spain) Adrià Soriano Barrera
September 5	Maribor, Slovenia; Clay; M25; Singles and Doubles Draws	(Argentina) Hernán Casanova; 6–0, 7–5	(Switzerland) Damien Wenger	(Bolivia) Murkel Dellien (Serbia) Stefan Popović	(Croatia) Mili Poljičak (France) Valentin Royer (Germany) Timo Stodder; Yan Bondarevskiy
September 5	Maribor, Slovenia; Clay; M25; Singles and Doubles Draws	(Latvia) Miķelis Lībietis (Germany) Timo Stodder; 6–3, 4–6, [10–8]	(Croatia) Domagoj Bilješko; Kirill Kivattsev	(Bolivia) Murkel Dellien (Serbia) Stefan Popović	(Croatia) Mili Poljičak (France) Valentin Royer (Germany) Timo Stodder; Yan Bondarevskiy
September 5	Budapest, Hungary; Hard; M15; Singles and Doubles Draws	(Czech Republic) Michael Vrbenský; 6–1, 6–3	(Hungary) Mátyás Füle	(Slovakia) Lukáš Pokorný (Hungary) Péter Fajta	(Hungary) Máté Valkusz (Georgia (country)) Aleksandre Metreveli (Georgia (country)) Aleksandre Bakshi (Israel) Sahar Simon
September 5	Budapest, Hungary; Hard; M15; Singles and Doubles Draws	(Czech Republic) Antonín Bolardt (Czech Republic) Michael Vrbenský; 6–4, 7–5	(Czech Republic) Matthew William Donald (United Kingdom) Mattias Southcombe	(Slovakia) Lukáš Pokorný (Hungary) Péter Fajta	(Hungary) Máté Valkusz (Georgia (country)) Aleksandre Metreveli (Georgia (country)) Aleksandre Bakshi (Israel) Sahar Simon
September 5	Salerno, Italy; Hard; M15; Singles and Doubles Draws	(Italy) Marcello Serafini; 6–3, 6–3	(Italy) Lorenzo Bocchi	(Italy) Gabriele Maria Noce (Italy) Andrea Picchione	(Italy) Filippo Speziali (Italy) Carlo Alberto Fossati (Italy) Federico Bondioli (Italy) Giorgio Ricca
September 5	Salerno, Italy; Hard; M15; Singles and Doubles Draws	(Italy) Niccolò Catini (Italy) Gabriele Maria Noce; 6–3, 5–7, [10–6]	(Italy) Leonardo Rossi (Italy) Luigi Sorrentino	(Italy) Gabriele Maria Noce (Italy) Andrea Picchione	(Italy) Filippo Speziali (Italy) Carlo Alberto Fossati (Italy) Federico Bondioli (Italy) Giorgio Ricca
September 5	Cancún, Mexico; Hard; M15; Singles and Doubles Draws	(Australia) Bernard Tomic; 7–6^{(7–4)}, 6–3	(United States) Tristan McCormick	(Venezuela) Ricardo Rodríguez-Pace (Colombia) Nicolás Buitrago	(United Kingdom) Blu Baker (United States) Mwendwa Mbithi (United States) Victor Lilov (Ecuador) Patricio Alvarado
September 5	Cancún, Mexico; Hard; M15; Singles and Doubles Draws	(United Kingdom) Blu Baker (United States) Tristan McCormick; 3–6, 6–4, ret.	(Syria) Kareem Al Allaf (United Kingdom) Joe Tyler	(Venezuela) Ricardo Rodríguez-Pace (Colombia) Nicolás Buitrago	(United Kingdom) Blu Baker (United States) Mwendwa Mbithi (United States) Victor Lilov (Ecuador) Patricio Alvarado
September 5	Casablanca, Morocco; Clay; M15; Singles and Doubles Draws	(Netherlands) Max Houkes; 6–4, 6–1	(Austria) David Pichler	Savriyan Danilov (France) Corentin Denolly	(France) Florent Bax (Argentina) Fermín Tenti (Chile) Bastián Malla (Italy) Luca Tomasetto
September 5	Casablanca, Morocco; Clay; M15; Singles and Doubles Draws	Savriyan Danilov; Mikhail Fufygin; 6–7^{(3–7)}, 6–1, [13–11]	(Spain) Bruno Pujol Navarro (Argentina) Fermín Tenti	Savriyan Danilov (France) Corentin Denolly	(France) Florent Bax (Argentina) Fermín Tenti (Chile) Bastián Malla (Italy) Luca Tomasetto
September 5	Constanța, Romania; Clay; M15; Singles and Doubles Draws	(Moldova) Ilya Snițari; 6–1, 6–3	(Ukraine) Oleksandr Bielinskyi	(Romania) Sebastian Gima (Romania) Vasile Antonescu	(Romania) Nicholas David Ionel (Bulgaria) Gabriel Donev (Germany) Kai Wehnelt (North Macedonia) Obrad Markovski
September 5	Constanța, Romania; Clay; M15; Singles and Doubles Draws	(Romania) Gabi Adrian Boitan (Germany) Kai Wehnelt; Walkover	(Romania) Vasile Antonescu (Germany) Dan Alexandru Tomescu	(Romania) Sebastian Gima (Romania) Vasile Antonescu	(Romania) Nicholas David Ionel (Bulgaria) Gabriel Donev (Germany) Kai Wehnelt (North Macedonia) Obrad Markovski
September 5	Madrid, Spain; Clay; M15; Singles and Doubles Draws	(Netherlands) Ryan Nijboer; 6–4, 2–6, 6–3	(Spain) Sergi Pérez Contri	(France) Maxime Chazal (Spain) Álvaro López San Martín	(Argentina) Matías Zukas (Spain) Xavi Matas Ortega (Germany) Peter Heller (Morocco) Lamine Ouahab
September 5	Madrid, Spain; Clay; M15; Singles and Doubles Draws	(Spain) Luis Francisco (Spain) Pablo Masjuan Ginel; 1–6, 6–3, [10–8]	(Spain) Alberto Romero de Ávila Senise (India) Digvijay Pratap Singh	(France) Maxime Chazal (Spain) Álvaro López San Martín	(Argentina) Matías Zukas (Spain) Xavi Matas Ortega (Germany) Peter Heller (Morocco) Lamine Ouahab
September 5	Monastir, Tunisia; Hard; M15; Singles and Doubles Draws	(Tunisia) Aziz Dougaz; 7–5, 6–3	(United States) Colin Markes	(New Zealand) Kiranpal Pannu (Australia) Matthew Dellavedova	(Serbia) Boris Butulija (India) Rishab Agarwal (Luxembourg) Alex Knaff (Serbia) Viktor Jović
September 5	Monastir, Tunisia; Hard; M15; Singles and Doubles Draws	(Tunisia) Anis Ghorbel (Tunisia) Aziz Ouakaa; 6–3, 5–7, [10–8]	(China) Sun Qian (China) Tang Sheng	(New Zealand) Kiranpal Pannu (Australia) Matthew Dellavedova	(Serbia) Boris Butulija (India) Rishab Agarwal (Luxembourg) Alex Knaff (Serbia) Viktor Jović
September 12	Darwin, Australia; Hard; M25; Singles and Doubles Draws	(Australia) Dane Sweeny; 4–6, 6–2, 6–1	(United States) Kyle Seelig	(Australia) James McCabe (Australia) Tristan Schoolkate	(Australia) Dayne Kelly (Australia) Adam Walton (Australia) Philip Sekulic (Australia) Moerani Bouzige
September 12	Darwin, Australia; Hard; M25; Singles and Doubles Draws	(Australia) Calum Puttergill (Australia) Dane Sweeny; 7–6^{(7–5)}, 6–3	(Australia) Joshua Charlton (Australia) Adam Walton	(Australia) James McCabe (Australia) Tristan Schoolkate	(Australia) Dayne Kelly (Australia) Adam Walton (Australia) Philip Sekulic (Australia) Moerani Bouzige
September 12	Plaisir, France; Hard (indoor); M25+H; Singles and Doubles Draws	(France) Antoine Hoang; 7–6^{(7–0)}, 6–3	(Switzerland) Jérôme Kym	(France) Sascha Gueymard Wayenburg (France) Jules Marie	(France) Alexis Gautier (France) Marc Antoine Gaillard (United Kingdom) Sean Hodkin (France) Jurgen Briand
September 12	Plaisir, France; Hard (indoor); M25+H; Singles and Doubles Draws	(France) Arthur Bouquier (Germany) Niklas Schell; 6–2, 6–2	(France) Constantin Bittoun Kouzmine (France) Maxence Brovillé	(France) Sascha Gueymard Wayenburg (France) Jules Marie	(France) Alexis Gautier (France) Marc Antoine Gaillard (United Kingdom) Sean Hodkin (France) Jurgen Briand
September 12	Santa Margherita di Pula, Italy; Clay; M25; Singles and Doubles Draws	(Netherlands) Jelle Sels; 6–4, 6–1	(Italy) Edoardo Lavagno	(Italy) Federico Arnaboldi (Germany) Lucas Gerch	(Italy) Stefano Napolitano (Italy) Gianmarco Ferrari; Andrey Chepelev (Italy) Alexander Weis
September 12	Santa Margherita di Pula, Italy; Clay; M25; Singles and Doubles Draws	(San Marino) Marco De Rossi (Italy) Andrea Picchione; 7–6^{(7–3)}, 6–2	(Italy) Niccolò Baroni (Italy) Stefano Papagno	(Italy) Federico Arnaboldi (Germany) Lucas Gerch	(Italy) Stefano Napolitano (Italy) Gianmarco Ferrari; Andrey Chepelev (Italy) Alexander Weis
September 12	Sintra, Portugal; Hard; M25; Singles and Doubles Draws	(Morocco) Elliot Benchetrit; 6–4, 6–1	(Netherlands) Jesper de Jong	(United States) Christian Langmo (Italy) Luca Potenza	(Portugal) Pedro Araújo (Portugal) Martim Leote Prata (United States) Alfredo Perez (United Kingdom) Harry Wendelken
September 12	Sintra, Portugal; Hard; M25; Singles and Doubles Draws	(United States) Alfredo Perez (Portugal) Duarte Vale; 6–3, 4–6, [10–8]	(Portugal) Fábio Coelho (Portugal) Jaime Faria	(United States) Christian Langmo (Italy) Luca Potenza	(Portugal) Pedro Araújo (Portugal) Martim Leote Prata (United States) Alfredo Perez (United Kingdom) Harry Wendelken
September 12	Madrid, Spain; Hard; M25; Singles and Doubles Draws	(Austria) Lukas Neumayer; 6–4, 6–1	(United States) Nicolas Moreno de Alboran	(Spain) David Jordà Sanchis (Spain) Alberto Barroso Campos	(North Macedonia) Kalin Ivanovski (Germany) Peter Heller (India) Digvijay Pratap Singh; Svyatoslav Gulin
September 12	Madrid, Spain; Hard; M25; Singles and Doubles Draws	(United Kingdom) Scott Duncan (United Kingdom) Marcus Willis; 6–1, 6–3	(Algeria) Nazim Makhlouf (Morocco) Lamine Ouahab	(Spain) David Jordà Sanchis (Spain) Alberto Barroso Campos	(North Macedonia) Kalin Ivanovski (Germany) Peter Heller (India) Digvijay Pratap Singh; Svyatoslav Gulin
September 12	Sharm El Sheikh, Egypt; Hard; M15; Singles and Doubles Draws	(South Africa) Alec Beckley; 6–4, 6–4	(Italy) Simone Roncalli	(South Africa) Kris van Wyk (Italy) Filippo Speziali	(Netherlands) Roland Stuurman (Netherlands) Jesse de Jager; Alexander Zgirovsky (Georgia (country)) Saba Purtseladze
September 12	Sharm El Sheikh, Egypt; Hard; M15; Singles and Doubles Draws	(Netherlands) Jesse de Jager (Netherlands) Roland Stuurman; 7–6^{(8–6)}, 6–4	(India) S D Prajwal Dev (India) Abhinav Sanjeev Shanmugam	(South Africa) Kris van Wyk (Italy) Filippo Speziali	(Netherlands) Roland Stuurman (Netherlands) Jesse de Jager; Alexander Zgirovsky (Georgia (country)) Saba Purtseladze
September 12	Cancún, Mexico; Hard; M15; Singles and Doubles Draws	(United States) Tristan McCormick; 6–3, 6–3	(Syria) Kareem Al Allaf	(Canada) Liam Draxl (Japan) Kosuke Ogura	(Israel) Orel Kimhi (Moldova) Alexander Cozbinov (Ecuador) Cayetano March (United States) Alex Kuperstein
September 12	Cancún, Mexico; Hard; M15; Singles and Doubles Draws	(France) Paul Inchauspé (United States) Victor Lilov; 6–3, 6–4	(Israel) Ron Ellouck (Israel) Orel Kimhi	(Canada) Liam Draxl (Japan) Kosuke Ogura	(Israel) Orel Kimhi (Moldova) Alexander Cozbinov (Ecuador) Cayetano March (United States) Alex Kuperstein
September 12	Casablanca, Morocco; Clay; M15; Singles and Doubles Draws	(Netherlands) Max Houkes; 6–2, 7–6^{(8–6)}	(France) Titouan Droguet	(Austria) David Pichler (France) Arthur Weber	(France) Nathan Seateun; Savriyan Danilov (France) Florent Bax (Italy) Alessandro Ragazzi
September 12	Casablanca, Morocco; Clay; M15; Singles and Doubles Draws	Daniil Golubev (Austria) David Pichler; 7–5, 3–6, [10–8]	(Argentina) Thiago Cigarrán (Argentina) Sean Hess	(Austria) David Pichler (France) Arthur Weber	(France) Nathan Seateun; Savriyan Danilov (France) Florent Bax (Italy) Alessandro Ragazzi
September 12	Zlatibor, Serbia; Clay; M15; Singles and Doubles Draws	(Belgium) Gauthier Onclin; 6–1, 6–4	(Moldova) Ilya Snițari	(Serbia) Stefan Popović; Kirill Kivattsev	(France) Luka Pavlovic (Croatia) Duje Kekez (Montenegro) Rrezart Cungu (France) Lilian Marmousez
September 12	Zlatibor, Serbia; Clay; M15; Singles and Doubles Draws	(Serbia) Stefan Popović (Serbia) Strahinja Rakić; 4–6, 6–3, [10–3]	(France) Lilian Marmousez (France) Luka Pavlovic	(Serbia) Stefan Popović; Kirill Kivattsev	(France) Luka Pavlovic (Croatia) Duje Kekez (Montenegro) Rrezart Cungu (France) Lilian Marmousez
September 12	Monastir, Tunisia; Hard; M15; Singles and Doubles Draws	(France) Robin Bertrand; 6–7^{(10–12)}, 6–4, 6–0	Bekhan Atlangeriev	(France) Cyril Vandermeersch (Germany) Facundo Yunis	(Germany) Luca Wiedenmann (Germany) Jakob Schnaitter (China) Mu Tao (Slovakia) Lukáš Palovič
September 12	Monastir, Tunisia; Hard; M15; Singles and Doubles Draws	(India) Sai Karteek Reddy Ganta (India) Parikshit Somani; 6–3, 6–4	(China) Sun Qian (China) Tang Sheng	(France) Cyril Vandermeersch (Germany) Facundo Yunis	(Germany) Luca Wiedenmann (Germany) Jakob Schnaitter (China) Mu Tao (Slovakia) Lukáš Palovič
September 12	Champaign, United States; Hard; M15; Singles and Doubles Draws	(Canada) Justin Boulais; 6–1, 6–1	(United States) Sekou Bangoura	(Japan) Rei Sakamoto (Japan) Yuta Kikuchi	(Slovakia) Peter Benjamín Privara (United States) AJ Catanzariti (Australia) Edward Winter (Paraguay) Daniel Vallejo
September 12	Champaign, United States; Hard; M15; Singles and Doubles Draws	(United States) Hunter Heck (Australia) Edward Winter; 6–1, 7–6^{(7–2)}	(Canada) Peter Kuszynski (Germany) Jannik Opitz	(Japan) Rei Sakamoto (Japan) Yuta Kikuchi	(Slovakia) Peter Benjamín Privara (United States) AJ Catanzariti (Australia) Edward Winter (Paraguay) Daniel Vallejo
September 19	Darwin, Australia; Hard; M25; Singles and Doubles Draws	(Australia) Dane Sweeny; 6–3, 6–7^{(4–7)}, 6–4	(Australia) Omar Jasika	(United States) Kyle Seelig (Australia) Adam Walton	(Australia) Philip Sekulic (Australia) Calum Puttergill (Australia) James McCabe (New Zealand) Rubin Statham
September 19	Darwin, Australia; Hard; M25; Singles and Doubles Draws	(United States) Kyle Seelig (Northern Mariana Islands) Colin Sinclair; 6–4, 6–4	(Australia) Tai Sach (Australia) Zaharije-Zak Talic	(United States) Kyle Seelig (Australia) Adam Walton	(Australia) Philip Sekulic (Australia) Calum Puttergill (Australia) James McCabe (New Zealand) Rubin Statham
September 19	Pardubice, Czech Republic; Clay; M25; Singles and Doubles Draws	(Czech Republic) Hynek Bartoň; 7–5, 7–5	(United Kingdom) Felix Gill	(France) Maxime Chazal (United States) Toby Kodat	(Syria) Hazem Naw (Czech Republic) Jakub Menšík (Belgium) Buvaysar Gadamauri (Czech Republic) Andrew Paulson
September 19	Pardubice, Czech Republic; Clay; M25; Singles and Doubles Draws	(Czech Republic) Matyáš Černý (Czech Republic) Dominik Reček; 6–4, 6–2	(Slovakia) Miloš Karol (United States) Toby Kodat	(France) Maxime Chazal (United States) Toby Kodat	(Syria) Hazem Naw (Czech Republic) Jakub Menšík (Belgium) Buvaysar Gadamauri (Czech Republic) Andrew Paulson
September 19	Santa Margherita di Pula, Italy; Clay; M25; Singles and Doubles Draws	(Spain) Carlos López Montagud; 7–5, 6–3	(Italy) Edoardo Lavagno	(Italy) Fabrizio Andaloro (Germany) Elmar Ejupovic	(Germany) Lucas Gerch (Italy) Giovanni Calvano (Italy) Fausto Tabacco (Italy) Andrea Picchione
September 19	Santa Margherita di Pula, Italy; Clay; M25; Singles and Doubles Draws	(Ukraine) Oleksandr Ovcharenko (Italy) Andrea Picchione; 6–1, 3–6, [10–7]	(Italy) Fausto Tabacco (Italy) Giorgio Tabacco	(Italy) Fabrizio Andaloro (Germany) Elmar Ejupovic	(Germany) Lucas Gerch (Italy) Giovanni Calvano (Italy) Fausto Tabacco (Italy) Andrea Picchione
September 19	Pirot, Serbia; Clay; M25; Singles and Doubles Draws	(Ukraine) Vladyslav Orlov; 6–1, 4–6, 6–3	(Romania) Cezar Crețu	Kirill Kivattsev (France) Corentin Denolly	(Montenegro) Rrezart Cungu (Romania) Valentin Vanta (Bulgaria) Gabriel Donev (France) Lilian Marmousez
September 19	Pirot, Serbia; Clay; M25; Singles and Doubles Draws	(Croatia) Domagoj Bilješko; Kirill Kivattsev; 6–4, 4–6, [10–8]	(Ukraine) Vladyslav Orlov (Australia) Adam Taylor	Kirill Kivattsev (France) Corentin Denolly	(Montenegro) Rrezart Cungu (Romania) Valentin Vanta (Bulgaria) Gabriel Donev (France) Lilian Marmousez
September 19	Sharm El Sheikh, Egypt; Hard; M15; Singles and Doubles Draws	(Italy) Daniele Capecchi; 7–6^{(7–5)}, ret.	(Germany) Dominik Böhler	(Italy) Lorenzo Rottoli (Italy) Simone Roncalli	Alexander Zgirovsky (Italy) Marcello Serafini (South Africa) Kris van Wyk (South Africa) Alec Beckley
September 19	Sharm El Sheikh, Egypt; Hard; M15; Singles and Doubles Draws	Aliaksandr Liaonenka; Alexander Zgirovsky; 6–2, 6–0	(South Africa) Alec Beckley (South Africa) Kris van Wyk	(Italy) Lorenzo Rottoli (Italy) Simone Roncalli	Alexander Zgirovsky (Italy) Marcello Serafini (South Africa) Kris van Wyk (South Africa) Alec Beckley
September 19	Cancún, Mexico; Hard; M15; Singles and Doubles Draws	(Moldova) Alexander Cozbinov; 6–3, 6–1	(United States) Tristan McCormick	(United States) Leanid Boika (Ecuador) Cayetano March	(Brazil) João Marcos Nusdeo (Paraguay) Daniel Vallejo (Colombia) Mateo Gómez (Ecuador) Andrés Andrade
September 19	Cancún, Mexico; Hard; M15; Singles and Doubles Draws	(United States) Tristan McCormick (United Kingdom) Hamish Stewart; 6–3, 7–5	(Costa Rica) Jesse Flores (Venezuela) Ricardo Rodríguez-Pace	(United States) Leanid Boika (Ecuador) Cayetano March	(Brazil) João Marcos Nusdeo (Paraguay) Daniel Vallejo (Colombia) Mateo Gómez (Ecuador) Andrés Andrade
September 19	Melilla, Spain; Clay; M15; Singles and Doubles Draws	(Spain) Álvaro López San Martín; 6–2, 7–6^{(10–8)}	(Switzerland) Mirko Martinez	(Spain) Max Alcalá Gurri (Argentina) Federico Agustín Gómez	(Spain) Sergi Pérez Contri (Spain) Jaime Caldes (Spain) Benjamín Winter López (Spain) Diego Augusto Barreto Sánchez
September 19	Melilla, Spain; Clay; M15; Singles and Doubles Draws	(Spain) Sergi Pérez Contri (Spain) Benjamín Winter López; 6–3, 6–3	(Czech Republic) Filip Apltauer (Morocco) Imran Sibille	(Spain) Max Alcalá Gurri (Argentina) Federico Agustín Gómez	(Spain) Sergi Pérez Contri (Spain) Jaime Caldes (Spain) Benjamín Winter López (Spain) Diego Augusto Barreto Sánchez
September 19	Danderyd, Sweden; Clay; M15; Singles and Doubles Draws	(Sweden) Karl Friberg; 6–4, 7–6^{(10–8)}	(Croatia) Vito Tonejc	(Sweden) Simon Freund (United Kingdom) Johannus Monday	(Germany) Marvin Möller (Germany) Johannes Härteis (United Kingdom) Giles Hussey (Sweden) Jonathan Mridha
September 19	Danderyd, Sweden; Clay; M15; Singles and Doubles Draws	(Sweden) Karl Friberg (Sweden) Jonathan Mridha; 6–2, 6–4	(Sweden) Simon Freund (Denmark) Benjamin Hannestad	(Sweden) Simon Freund (United Kingdom) Johannus Monday	(Germany) Marvin Möller (Germany) Johannes Härteis (United Kingdom) Giles Hussey (Sweden) Jonathan Mridha
September 19	Monastir, Tunisia; Hard; M15; Singles and Doubles Draws	(Tunisia) Skander Mansouri; 6–3, 6–4	(Ivory Coast) Eliakim Coulibaly	(France) Robin Bertrand (Tunisia) Aziz Dougaz	(South Africa) Khololwam Montsi (China) Mu Tao (Australia) Matthew Dellavedova (France) Alexandre Aubriot
September 19	Monastir, Tunisia; Hard; M15; Singles and Doubles Draws	(Spain) Alberto Barroso Campos (Germany) Niklas Schell; 6–4, 7–5	(Chinese Taipei) Huang Tsung-hao (Chinese Taipei) Yin Bang-shuo	(France) Robin Bertrand (Tunisia) Aziz Dougaz	(South Africa) Khololwam Montsi (China) Mu Tao (Australia) Matthew Dellavedova (France) Alexandre Aubriot
September 19	Lubbock, United States; Hard; M15; Singles and Doubles Draws	(Sweden) Olle Wallin; 6–4, 6–2	(Jamaica) Blaise Bicknell	(United States) Alex Michelsen (Israel) Jordan Hasson	(United States) Aidan Kim (United States) Jaycer Lyeons (United States) Connor Farren (Greece) Demetris Azoides
September 19	Lubbock, United States; Hard; M15; Singles and Doubles Draws	(Canada) Juan Carlos Aguilar (United States) Pranav Kumar; 6–3, 7–5	(Slovakia) Krištof Minárik (United States) Alexander Richards	(United States) Alex Michelsen (Israel) Jordan Hasson	(United States) Aidan Kim (United States) Jaycer Lyeons (United States) Connor Farren (Greece) Demetris Azoides
September 19	Fayetteville, United States; Hard; M15; Singles and Doubles Draws	(United States) Sam Riffice; 5–1, ret.	(United Kingdom) Blu Baker	(Romania) Radu Mihai Papoe (Cyprus) Menelaos Efstathiou	(United Kingdom) Jack Pinnington Jones (Netherlands) Sander Jong (United States) Cooper Williams (United States) Warren Wood
September 19	Fayetteville, United States; Hard; M15; Singles and Doubles Draws	(Belgium) Alessio Basile (United States) Cooper Williams; 6–4, 6–3	(Switzerland) Adrien Burdet (France) Melvin Manuel	(Romania) Radu Mihai Papoe (Cyprus) Menelaos Efstathiou	(United Kingdom) Jack Pinnington Jones (Netherlands) Sander Jong (United States) Cooper Williams (United States) Warren Wood
September 26	Ibagué, Colombia; Clay; M25; Singles and Doubles Draws	(Brazil) Gustavo Heide; 6–3, 7–5	(Chile) Gonzalo Lama	(Peru) Jorge Panta (Italy) Davide Pontoglio	(Dominican Republic) Peter Bertran (Colombia) Alejandro Hoyos Franco (Ecuador) Álvaro Guillén Meza (Zimbabwe) Benjamin Lock
September 26	Ibagué, Colombia; Clay; M25; Singles and Doubles Draws	(Peru) Arklon Huertas del Pino (Peru) Conner Huertas del Pino; 6–2, 7–6^{(8–6)}	(Brazil) Gustavo Heide (Brazil) João Victor Couto Loureiro	(Peru) Jorge Panta (Italy) Davide Pontoglio	(Dominican Republic) Peter Bertran (Colombia) Alejandro Hoyos Franco (Ecuador) Álvaro Guillén Meza (Zimbabwe) Benjamin Lock
September 26	Santa Margherita di Pula, Italy; Clay; M25; Singles and Doubles Draws	(France) Titouan Droguet; 6–3, 6–2	(Germany) Elmar Ejupovic	(Italy) Giorgio Tabacco (Italy) Andrea Basso	(Ukraine) Oleksandr Ovcharenko (Italy) Giovanni Fonio (Italy) Davide Galoppini (Italy) Luca Potenza
September 26	Santa Margherita di Pula, Italy; Clay; M25; Singles and Doubles Draws	(Latvia) Miķelis Lībietis (Germany) Timo Stodder; Walkover	(Ukraine) Oleksandr Ovcharenko (Italy) Andrea Picchione	(Italy) Giorgio Tabacco (Italy) Andrea Basso	(Ukraine) Oleksandr Ovcharenko (Italy) Giovanni Fonio (Italy) Davide Galoppini (Italy) Luca Potenza
September 26	Kashiwa, Japan; Hard; M25; Singles and Doubles Draws	(Japan) Rimpei Kawakami; Walkover	(Japan) Rio Noguchi	(Japan) Makoto Ochi (Japan) Ryota Tanuma	(Japan) Takuya Kumasaka (Japan) Shinji Hazawa (Japan) Yuta Shimizu (Japan) Koki Matsuda
September 26	Kashiwa, Japan; Hard; M25; Singles and Doubles Draws	(Japan) Toshihide Matsui (Japan) Kaito Uesugi; 6–3, 4–6, [10–5]	(Japan) Naoki Tajima (Japan) Seita Watanabe	(Japan) Makoto Ochi (Japan) Ryota Tanuma	(Japan) Takuya Kumasaka (Japan) Shinji Hazawa (Japan) Yuta Shimizu (Japan) Koki Matsuda
September 26	Falun, Sweden; Hard (indoor); M25; Singles and Doubles Draws	(Poland) Kacper Żuk; 6–3, 6–3	(Sweden) Karl Friberg	(United Kingdom) Johannus Monday (Germany) Henri Squire	(France) Valentin Royer (France) Dan Added (Czech Republic) David Poljak (United Kingdom) Stuart Parker
September 26	Falun, Sweden; Hard (indoor); M25; Singles and Doubles Draws	(United Kingdom) Giles Hussey (United Kingdom) Johannus Monday; 4–6, 7–5, [10–4]	(Finland) Vesa Ahti (Sweden) Arslanbek Temirhanov	(United Kingdom) Johannus Monday (Germany) Henri Squire	(France) Valentin Royer (France) Dan Added (Czech Republic) David Poljak (United Kingdom) Stuart Parker
September 26	Tây Ninh, Vietnam; Hard; M25; Singles and Doubles Draws	(Chinese Taipei) Hsu Yu-hsiou; 6–3, 6–2	(Vietnam) Lý Hoàng Nam	(Cambodia) Bun Kenny (Hong Kong) Coleman Wong	(Japan) Masamichi Imamura (Italy) Tommaso Compagnucci (New Zealand) Ajeet Rai (Japan) Yuki Mochizuki
September 26	Tây Ninh, Vietnam; Hard; M25; Singles and Doubles Draws	(Philippines) Francis Alcantara (Thailand) Pruchya Isaro; 2–6, 6–3, [10–3]	(Chinese Taipei) Hsu Yu-hsiou (Thailand) Wishaya Trongcharoenchaikul	(Cambodia) Bun Kenny (Hong Kong) Coleman Wong	(Japan) Masamichi Imamura (Italy) Tommaso Compagnucci (New Zealand) Ajeet Rai (Japan) Yuki Mochizuki
September 26	Prostějov, Czech Republic; Clay; M15; Singles and Doubles Draws	(Czech Republic) Andrew Paulson; 6–4, 6–3	(Czech Republic) Daniel Siniakov	(Germany) Tim Handel (France) Maxime Chazal	(Republic of Ireland) Michael Agwi (Czech Republic) Hynek Bartoň (Slovenia) Jan Kupčič (Czech Republic) Jakub Menšík
September 26	Prostějov, Czech Republic; Clay; M15; Singles and Doubles Draws	(Czech Republic) Jiří Jeníček (Czech Republic) Daniel Pátý; 6–3, 6–4	(Czech Republic) Adam Jurajda (Czech Republic) Daniel Siniakov	(Germany) Tim Handel (France) Maxime Chazal	(Republic of Ireland) Michael Agwi (Czech Republic) Hynek Bartoň (Slovenia) Jan Kupčič (Czech Republic) Jakub Menšík
September 26	Sharm El Sheikh, Egypt; Hard; M15; Singles and Doubles Draws	(Georgia (country)) Zura Tkemaladze; 6–1, 6–4	(Italy) Marcello Serafini	(United Kingdom) Mark Whitehouse (Italy) Daniele Capecchi	(South Korea) Lee Tae-woo (Israel) Sahar Simon; Daniil Ostapenkov (Italy) Leonardo Rossi
September 26	Sharm El Sheikh, Egypt; Hard; M15; Singles and Doubles Draws	Aliaksandr Liaonenka; Alexander Zgirovsky; 7–5, 6–4	(Slovakia) Lukáš Pokorný (Georgia (country)) Saba Purtseladze	(United Kingdom) Mark Whitehouse (Italy) Daniele Capecchi	(South Korea) Lee Tae-woo (Israel) Sahar Simon; Daniil Ostapenkov (Italy) Leonardo Rossi
September 26	Forbach, France; Carpet (indoor); M15; Singles and Doubles Draws	(Germany) Max Hans Rehberg; 6–4, 6–2	(Argentina) Federico Agustín Gómez	(France) Boris Fassbender (Luxembourg) Alex Knaff	(Switzerland) Jérôme Kym (France) Arthur Bouquier (Morocco) Adam Moundir (France) Maxence Brovillé
September 26	Forbach, France; Carpet (indoor); M15; Singles and Doubles Draws	(France) Amaury Raynel (France) Arthur Reymond; 6–1, 7–6^{(7–4)}	(France) Arthur Bouquier (France) Grégoire Jacq	(France) Boris Fassbender (Luxembourg) Alex Knaff	(Switzerland) Jérôme Kym (France) Arthur Bouquier (Morocco) Adam Moundir (France) Maxence Brovillé
September 26	Cancún, Mexico; Hard; M15; Singles and Doubles Draws	(Australia) Bernard Tomic; 7–6^{(7–5)}, 6–3	(Moldova) Alexander Cozbinov	(Ecuador) Andrés Andrade (United States) Alex Kuperstein	(Israel) Orel Kimhi (Paraguay) Daniel Vallejo (Argentina) Luciano Doria (Israel) Ron Ellouck
September 26	Cancún, Mexico; Hard; M15; Singles and Doubles Draws	(Ecuador) Andrés Andrade (India) Siddhant Banthia; 6–7^{(3–7)}, 6–3, [10–8]	(United States) Jake Bhangdia (United Kingdom) Hamish Stewart	(Ecuador) Andrés Andrade (United States) Alex Kuperstein	(Israel) Orel Kimhi (Paraguay) Daniel Vallejo (Argentina) Luciano Doria (Israel) Ron Ellouck
September 26	Sabadell, Spain; Clay; M15; Singles and Doubles Draws	(Spain) Max Alcalá Gurri; 6–4, 6–1	(Spain) Álvaro López San Martín	(Bulgaria) Leonid Sheyngezikht (Spain) David Jordà Sanchis	(Switzerland) Noah Lopez (Spain) Xavi Matas Ortega (Croatia) Luka Mikrut (Spain) Imanol López Morillo
September 26	Sabadell, Spain; Clay; M15; Singles and Doubles Draws	Svyatoslav Gulin (Bulgaria) Leonid Sheyngezikht; 6–1, 6–3	(Spain) Iván Arenas Gualda (Netherlands) Ryan Nijboer	(Bulgaria) Leonid Sheyngezikht (Spain) David Jordà Sanchis	(Switzerland) Noah Lopez (Spain) Xavi Matas Ortega (Croatia) Luka Mikrut (Spain) Imanol López Morillo
September 26	Monastir, Tunisia; Hard; M15; Singles and Doubles Draws	(Ivory Coast) Eliakim Coulibaly; 6–2, 6–3	(Australia) Matthew Dellavedova	(Spain) Alberto Barroso Campos (China) Sun Fajing	(Germany) Luca Wiedenmann (China) Mu Tao (Romania) Sebastian Gima (France) Gabriel Debru
September 26	Monastir, Tunisia; Hard; M15; Singles and Doubles Draws	(Chinese Taipei) Huang Tsung-hao (Netherlands) Jarno Jans; 7–6^{(7–4)}, 6–4	(Spain) Alberto Barroso Campos (Germany) Niklas Schell	(Spain) Alberto Barroso Campos (China) Sun Fajing	(Germany) Luca Wiedenmann (China) Mu Tao (Romania) Sebastian Gima (France) Gabriel Debru
September 26	Albuquerque, United States; Hard; M15; Singles and Doubles Draws	(Sweden) Olle Wallin; 7–6^{(8–6)}, 7–5	(Poland) Maciej Rajski	(Republic of Ireland) Osgar O'Hoisin (United States) Connor Farren	(United States) Cash Hanzlik (Canada) Christian Lakoseljac (Japan) Rei Sakamoto (United States) Ryan Dickerson
September 26	Albuquerque, United States; Hard; M15; Singles and Doubles Draws	(United Kingdom) Alexander Maggs (Czech Republic) Jan Pučálka; 7–5, 7–5	(Greece) Demetris Azoides (Argentina) Franco Ribero	(Republic of Ireland) Osgar O'Hoisin (United States) Connor Farren	(United States) Cash Hanzlik (Canada) Christian Lakoseljac (Japan) Rei Sakamoto (United States) Ryan Dickerson
