= 2013 Davis Cup =

2013 edition of the Davis Cup

Details
- Duration: 1 February – 17 November 2013
- Edition: 102nd

Champion
- Winning nation: Czech Republic

The 2013 Davis Cup (also known as the 2013 Davis Cup by BNP Paribas for sponsorship purposes) was the 102nd edition of the tournament between national teams in men's tennis. Czech Republic successfully held their place as Davis Cup champions, by defeating Serbia in the final, in Belgrade, by a 3–2 score. The draw took place on 19 September 2012 in London, United Kingdom. Although, the draws for Asia/Oceania Zone Group I and Europe/Africa Zone Group II were held following the remaining play-off ties on 19–21 October 2012.

== World Group ==
Participating teams
| Argentina | Austria | Belgium | Brazil |
| Canada | Croatia | Czech Republic | France |
| Germany | Israel | Italy | Kazakhstan |
| Serbia | Spain | Switzerland | United States |

=== Seeds ===
1. Spain (first round)
2. Czech Republic (champion)
3. Argentina (semifinals)
4. Serbia (final)
5. France (quarterfinals)
6. United States (quarterfinals)
7. Croatia (first round)
8. Kazakhstan (quarterfinals)

=== Draw ===
First round 1–3 February
Vancouver, Canada (indoor hard)
1 | Spain | 2
Canada | 3
Turin, Italy (indoor clay)
7 | Croatia | 2
Italy | 3
Charleroi, Belgium (indoor clay)
4 | Serbia | 3
Belgium | 2
Jacksonville, United States (indoor hard)
6 | United States | 3
Brazil | 2
Rouen, France (indoor hard)
Israel | 0
5 | France | 5
Buenos Aires, Argentina (clay)
Germany | 0
3 | Argentina | 5
Astana, Kazakhstan (indoor clay)
Austria | 1
8 | Kazakhstan | 3
Geneva, Switzerland (indoor hard)
Switzerland | 2
2 | Czech Republic | 3

Quarterfinals; 5–7 April
Vancouver, Canada (indoor hard)
Canada | 3
Italy | 1
Boise, United States (indoor hard)
4 | Serbia | 3
6 | United States | 1
Buenos Aires, Argentina (clay)
5 | France | 2
3 | Argentina | 3
Astana, Kazakhstan (indoor clay)
8 | Kazakhstan | 1
2 | Czech Republic | 3

Semifinals; 13–15 September
Belgrade, Serbia (indoor clay)
Canada | 2
4 | Serbia | 3
Prague, Czech Republic (indoor hard)
3 | Argentina | 2
2 | Czech Republic | 3

Final; 15–17 November
Belgrade, Serbia (indoor hard)
4 | Serbia | 2
2 | Czech Republic | 3

=== Final ===
Serbia
2
Belgrade Arena, Belgrade, Serbia
15–17 November 2013
Hard (i)

Czech Republic
3

| | | | 1 | 2 | 3 | 4 | 5 |
|---|---|---|---|---|---|---|---|
| 1 | (Serbia) (Czech Republic) | Novak Djokovic; Radek Štěpánek | 7; 5 | 6; 1 | 6; 4 |
| 2 | (Serbia) (Czech Republic) | Dušan Lajović; Tomáš Berdych | 3; 6 | 4; 6 | 3; 6 |
| 3 | (Serbia) (Czech Republic) | Ilija Bozoljac / Nenad Zimonjić; Tomáš Berdych / Radek Štěpánek | 2; 6 | 4; 6 | 6^{4} 7^{7} |
| 4 | (Serbia) (Czech Republic) | Novak Djokovic; Tomáš Berdych | 6; 4 | 7^{7} 6^{5} | 6; 2 |
| 5 | (Serbia) (Czech Republic) | Dušan Lajović; Radek Štěpánek | 3; 6 | 1; 6 | 1; 6 |

== World Group play-offs ==
Date: 13–15 September

The eight losing teams in the World Group first round ties and eight winners of the Zonal Group I final round ties will compete in the World Group play-offs for spots in the 2014 World Group. The draw took place April 11 in London.

Bold indicates team qualified for the 2014 Davis Cup World Group

**Seeded teams**

- **Spain**
- Austria
- Croatia
- **Switzerland**
- **Germany**
- **Australia**
- **Belgium**
- **Japan**

**Unseeded teams**

- Brazil
- Colombia
- Ecuador
- **Great Britain**
- Israel
- **Netherlands**
- Poland
- Ukraine

| Home team | Score | Visiting team | Location | Venue | Door | Surface |
|---|---|---|---|---|---|---|
| **Spain** | 5−0 | Ukraine | Madrid | Caja Mágica | Outdoor | Clay |
| **Netherlands** | 5−0 | Austria | Groningen | Martiniplaza | Indoor | Clay |
| Croatia | 1−4 | **Great Britain** | Umag | ITC Stella Maris | Outdoor | Clay |
| **Switzerland** | 4−1 | Ecuador | Neuchâtel | Patinoire du Littoral | Indoor | Hard |
| **Germany** | 4−1 | Brazil | Neu-Ulm | Ratiopharm Arena | Indoor | Hard |
| Poland | 1−4 | **Australia** | Warsaw | Torwar Hall | Indoor | Clay |
| **Belgium** | 3−2 | Israel | Antwerp | Lotto Arena | Indoor | Clay |
| **Japan** | 3−2 | Colombia | Tokyo | Ariake Coliseum | Outdoor | Hard |

- Belgium, Germany, Spain and Switzerland remained in the World Group in 2014.
- Australia, Great Britain, Japan and Netherlands were promoted to the World Group in 2014.
- Colombia, Ecuador, Poland and Ukraine remained in Zonal Group I in 2014.
- Austria, Brazil, Croatia and Israel were relegated to Zonal Group I in 2014.

== Americas Zone ==
=== Group I ===
Seeds:

1. Chile
2. Colombia

Remaining nations:

- Dominican Republic
- Ecuador
- Uruguay

==== Draw ====
Second round play-offs
Santo Domingo Este, Dominican Republic (hard)
1 | Chile | 1
Dominican Republic | 4

First round play-offs
1 | Chile
bye
Dominican Republic
bye

First round
1 | Chile
bye
Ecuador
bye
Montevideo, Uruguay (clay)
Uruguay | 3
Dominican Republic | 1
bye
2 | Colombia

Second round
Manta, Ecuador (hard)
1 | Chile | 2
Ecuador | 3
Cúcuta, Colombia (hard)
Uruguay | 0
2 | Colombia | 5

- Chile relegated to Group II in 2014.
- Ecuador and Colombia advance to World Group Play-off.

=== Group II ===
Seeds:

1. Mexico
2. Peru
3. Venezuela
4. El Salvador

Remaining nations:

- Barbados
- Guatemala
- Haiti
- Puerto Rico

==== Draw ====
Play-offs
St. Michael, Barbados (hard)
Puerto Rico | 1
Barbados | 3
Guatemala City, Guatemala (hard)
Guatemala | 4
Haiti | 1

First Round
Humacao, Puerto Rico (hard)
1 | Mexico | 4
Puerto Rico | 1
Santa Tecla, El Salvador (clay)
4 | El Salvador | 4
Barbados | 1
San Juan de los Morros, Ven. (hard)
Guatemala | 1
3 | Venezuela | 4
Lima, Peru (clay)
Haiti | 0
2 | Peru | 5

Second Round
Ciudad Merliot, El Salvador (hard)
1 | Mexico | 2
4 | El Salvador | 3
Arequipa, Peru (clay)
3 | Venezuela | 4
2 | Peru | 1

Third Round
El Salvador
4 | El Salvador | 1
3 | Venezuela | 3

- Puerto Rico and Haiti relegated to Group III in 2014.
- Venezuela promoted to Group I in 2014.

=== Group III ===
- Venue: Club de Tennis, La Paz, Bolivia (outdoor clay)
- Date: 17-22 June

| Rank | Team |
|---|---|
| 1 | Bolivia |
| 2 | Paraguay |
| 3 | Bahamas |
| 4 | Costa Rica |
| 5 | Honduras |
| 6 | Jamaica |
| 7 | Cuba |
| 8 | Panama |
| 9 | Bermuda |

- Bolivia and Paraguay promoted to Group II in 2014.

== Asia/Oceania Zone ==
=== Group I ===
Seeds:

1. Australia
2. Japan
3. Uzbekistan
4. India

Remaining nations:

- China
- Chinese Taipei
- Indonesia
- South Korea

==== Draw ====
Second Round Play-offs
Chinese Taipei (hard)
Chinese Taipei | 5
Indonesia | 0

First Round Play-offs
Tianjin, China (hard)
Chinese Taipei | 0
China | 5
Bangalore, India (hard)
India | 5
Indonesia | 0

First Round
Kaohsiung City, Taiwan (hard)
1 | Australia | 5
Chinese Taipei | 0
Namangan, Uzbekistan (indoor clay)
3 | Uzbekistan | 4
China | 1
New Delhi, India (hard)
South Korea | 4
4 | India | 1
Tokyo, Japan (indoor hard)
Indonesia | 0
2 | Japan | 5

Second Round
Namangan, Uzbekistan (indoor clay)
1 | Australia | 3
3 | Uzbekistan | 1
Tokyo, Japan (indoor hard)
South Korea | 2
2 | Japan | 3

- Indonesia relegated to Group II in 2014.
- Australia and Japan advance to World Group play-offs.

=== Group II ===
Seeds:

1. New Zealand
2. Philippines
3. Thailand
4. Pakistan

Remaining nations:

- Kuwait
- Lebanon
- Sri Lanka
- Syria

==== Draw ====
Play-offs
Jounieh, Lebanon (clay)
Lebanon | 2
Sri Lanka | 3
Mishref, Kuwait (hard)
Kuwait | 3
Syria | 2

First Round
Auckland, New Zealand (indoor hard)
1 | New Zealand | 5
Lebanon | 0
Colombo, Sri Lanka (clay)
4 | Pakistan | 3
Sri Lanka | 2
Meshref, Kuwait (hard)
Kuwait | 1
3 | Thailand | 4
Lapu-Lapu City, Philippines (clay)
Syria | 2
2 | Philippines | 3

Second Round
Yangon, Myanmar (grass)
1 | New Zealand | 4
4 | Pakistan | 1
Lapu-Lapu City, Philippines (clay)
3 | Thailand | 1
2 | Philippines | 4

Third Round
Lapu-Lapu City, Philippines
1 | New Zealand | 3
2 | Philippines | 2

- Lebanon and Syria relegated to Group III in 2014.
- New Zealand promoted to Group I in 2014.

=== Group III ===
The eight teams will be split into two pools of four, the top two nations will advance to the promotion pool. The two best teams from there will be promoted to Group II for 2014. The bottom two teams will play in a relegation pool, where the two last teams will be relegated to Group IV for 2014.

It was played on the week commencing 9 September 2013 and it was played at the Aviation Tennis Club in Dubai, United Arab Emirates.

=== Pools ===
| | Pool A | HKG | OMN | MAS | IRN |
| 1 | Hong Kong | | 2–1 | 3–0 | 2–1 |
| 2 | Oman | 1–2 | | 1–2 | 1–2 |
| 3 | Malaysia | 0–3 | 2–1 | | 2–1 |
| 4 | Iran | 1–2 | 2–1 | 1–2 | |

| | Pool B | POC | UAE | VIE | CAM |
| 1 | Pacific Oceania | | 1–2 | 1–2 | 1–2 |
| 2 | United Arab Emirates | 2–1 | | 0–3 | 1–2 |
| 3 | Vietnam | 2–1 | 3–0 | | 3–0 |
| 4 | Cambodia | 2–1 | 2–1 | 0–3 | |

=== Play-offs ===
| | Promotion | HKG | VIE | MAS | CAM |
| 1 | Hong Kong | | 1–2 | 3–0 | 2–1 |
| 2 | Vietnam | 2–1 | | 1–2 | 3–0 |
| 3 | Malaysia | 0–3 | 2–1 | | 3–0 |
| 4 | Cambodia | 1–2 | 0–3 | 0–3 | |

| | Relegation | POC | UAE | OMN | IRN |
| 1 | Pacific Oceania | | 1–2 | 2–1 | 1–2 |
| 2 | United Arab Emirates | 2–1 | | 3–0 | 0–3 |
| 3 | Oman | 1–2 | 0–3 | | 1–2 |
| 4 | Iran | 2–1 | 3–0 | 2–1 | |

- Hong Kong and Vietnam promoted to Group II in 2014
- Pacific Oceania and Oman relegated to Group IV in 2014

=== Group IV ===
- Venue: Dubai Aviation Club, Dubai. United Arab Emirates (outdoor hard)
- Date: 9–14 September

| Rank | Team |
|---|---|
| 1 | Turkmenistan |
| 2 | Singapore |
| 3 | Qatar |
| 4 | Saudi Arabia |
| 5 | Jordan |
| 6 | Bahrain |
| 7 | Myanmar |
| 8 | Bangladesh |
| 9 | Iraq |
| 10 | Kyrgyzstan |

- Turkmenistan and Singapore promoted to Group III in 2014.

== Europe/Africa Zone ==
=== Group I ===
Seeds:

1. Russia
2. Sweden
3. South Africa
4. Netherlands

Remaining nations:

- Denmark
- Great Britain
- Poland
- Romania
- Slovakia
- Slovenia
- Ukraine

==== Draw ====
All seeded teams get a bye into the second round, as well as Great Britain who were second round losers in the 2012 Davis Cup

Second Round Play-offs
Moscow, Russia (indoor hard)
1 | Russia | 5
3 | South Africa | 0
Helsingborg, Sweden (indoor hard)
Denmark | 2
2 | Sweden | 3

First Round Play-offs
1 | Russia
bye
Ljubljana, Slovenia (clay)
3 | South Africa | 1
Slovenia | 4
Denmark
bye
Bratislava, Slovakia (indoor hard)
Slovakia | 3
2 | Sweden | 2

First Round
1 | Russia
bye
Great Britain
bye
3 | South Africa
bye
Wrocław, Poland (indoor hard)
Poland | 3
Slovenia | 2
Cluj-Napoca, Romania (indoor hard)
Denmark | 0
Romania | 5
4 | Netherlands
bye
Kremenchuk, Ukraine (indoor hard)
Ukraine | 3
Slovakia | 2
bye
2 | Sweden

Second Round
Coventry, Great Britain (indoor hard)
1 | Russia | 2
Great Britain | 3
Zielona Góra, Poland (indoor hard)
3 | South Africa | 1
Poland | 3
Brasov, Romania (indoor hard)
Romania | 0
4 | Netherlands | 5
Dnipropetrovsk, Ukraine (indoor hard)
Ukraine | 3
2 | Sweden | 2

- South Africa and Denmark relegated to Group II in 2014.
- Great Britain, Poland, Netherlands, and Ukraine advance to World Group Play-off.

=== Group II ===
Seeds:

1. Finland
2. Portugal
3. Latvia
4. Bosnia and Herzegovina
5. Belarus
6. Hungary
7. Estonia
8. Cyprus

Remaining nations:

- Benin
- Bulgaria
- Ireland
- Lithuania
- Luxembourg
- Moldova
- Monaco
- Tunisia

==== Draw ====
Play-offs
Plovdiv, Bulgaria (clay)
Bulgaria | 3
7 | Estonia | 0
Tunis, Tunisia (clay)
Tunisia | 2
5 | Belarus | 3
Budapest, Hungary (hard)
6 | Hungary | 1
Luxembourg | 4
Nicosia, Cyprus (hard)
8 | Cyprus | 3
Benin | 2

First round
Sofia, Bulgaria (indoor hard)
1 | Finland | 3
Bulgaria | 2
Dublin, Ireland (indoor hard)
7 | Estonia | 2
Ireland | 3
El Menzah, Tunisia (hard)
3 | Latvia | 3
Tunisia | 0
Monte Carlo, Monaco (clay)
5 | Belarus | 1
Monaco | 3
Chișinău, Moldova (indoor hard)
Moldova | 3
6 | Hungary | 2
Sarajevo, Bosnia and Herz. (indoor hard)
Luxembourg | 1
4 | Bosnia and Herzegovina | 4
Šiauliai, Lithuania (indoor hard)
Lithuania | 4
8 | Cyprus | 1
Lisbon, Portugal (indoor clay)
Benin | 0
2 | Portugal | 5

Second round
Dublin, Ireland (indoor hard)
1 | Finland | 3
Ireland | 2
Monte Carlo, Monaco (clay)
3 | Latvia | 3
Monaco | 2
Mostar, Bosnia-Herzegovina (clay)
Moldova | 3
4 | Bosnia and Herzegovina | 1
Lisbon, Portugal (clay)
Lithuania | 0
2 | Portugal | 5

Third round
Riga, Latvia (indoor hard)
1 | Finland | 2
3 | Latvia | 3
Chișinău, Moldova (indoor hard)
Moldova | 2
2 | Portugal | 3

- Estonia, Tunisia, Hungary, and Benin relegated to Group III in 2014.
- Latvia and Portugal promoted to Group I in 2014.

=== Group III Europe ===
- Venue: Centro Tennis Cassa di Risparmio, San Marino (outdoor clay)
- Date: 22–25 May

The Europe Zone was one of the four zones within Group 3 of the regional Davis Cup competition in 2013. The zone's competition was held in round robin format in Centro Tennis Cassa di Risparmio, San Marino, May 22–25, on outdoor clay courts. The thirteen competing nations were divided into four pools of three or four teams. The winners from each pool played off to determine the two nations to be promoted to Europe/Africa Zone Group II in 2014, while the second and third placed nations played to off to determine overall placings within the group. The fourth-placed team in Pool D does not enter the play-offs.

== Draw ==
Pool A

| | Greece | Montenegro | Liechtenstein | RR W–L | Matches W–L | Sets W–L | Games W–L | Standings |
| Greece | | 3–0 | 3–0 | 2–0 | 6–0 | 12–1 | 74–32 | 1 |
| Montenegro | 0–3 | | 2–1 | 1–1 | 2–4 | 5–8 | 57–64 | 2 |
| Liechtenstein | 0–3 | 1–2 | | 0–2 | 1–5 | 2–10 | 32–67 | 3 |

Pool B

| | Norway | Malta | Iceland | RR W–L | Matches W–L | Sets W–L | Games W–L | Standings |
| Norway | | 3–0 | 3–0 | 2–0 | 6–0 | 12–0 | 73–22 | 1 |
| Malta | 0–3 | | 2–1 | 1–1 | 2–4 | 4–8 | 41–57 | 2 |
| Iceland | 0–3 | 1–2 | | 0–2 | 1–5 | 2–10 | 30–65 | 3 |

Pool C

| | Georgia | San Marino | Armenia | RR W–L | Matches W–L | Sets W–L | Games W–L | Standings |
| Georgia | | 3–0 | 3–0 | 2–0 | 6–0 | 12–1 | 79–29 | 1 |
| San Marino | 0–3 | | 3–0 | 1–1 | 3–3 | 7–6 | 49–62 | 2 |
| Armenia | 0–3 | 0–3 | | 0–2 | 0–6 | 0–12 | 37–74 | 3 |

Pool D

| | North Macedonia | Turkey | Albania | Azerbaijan | RR W–L | Matches W–L | Sets W–L | Games W–L | Standings |
| North Macedonia | | 3–0 | 3–0 | 3–0 | 3–0 | 9–0 | 18–0 | 111–36 | 1 |
| Turkey | 0–3 | | 3–0 | 3–0 | 2–1 | 6–3 | 12–6 | 98–49 | 2 |
| Albania | 0–3 | 0–3 | | 3–0 | 1–2 | 3–6 | 6–12 | 51–92 | 3 |
| Azerbaijan | 0–3 | 0–3 | 0–3 | | 0–3 | 0–9 | 0–18 | 27–110 | 4 |

== First round ==
=== Pool A ===
==== Greece vs. Montenegro ====
Greece
3
Centro Tennis Cassa di Risparmio, San Marino
22 May 2013
Clay

Montenegro
0

| | | | 1 | 2 | 3 |
|---|---|---|---|---|---|
| 1 | (Greece) (Montenegro) | Markos Kalovelonis; Pavle Rogan | 6; 2 | 6; 3 |
| 2 | (Greece) (Montenegro) | Alexandros Jakoubovits; Ljubomir Čelebić | 6; 3 | 1; 6 | 7^{7} 6^{5} |
| 3 | (Greece) (Montenegro) | Charalampos Kapogiannis / Konstantinos Mikos; Igor Saveljić / Ivan Saveljić | 6; 2 | 6; 4 |

==== Greece vs. Liechtenstein ====
Greece
3
Centro Tennis Cassa di Risparmio, San Marino
23 May 2013
Clay

Liechtenstein
0

| | | | 1 | 2 | 3 |
|---|---|---|---|---|---|
| 1 | (Greece) (Liechtenstein) | Markos Kalovelonis; Timo Kranz | 6; 2 | 6; 0 |
| 2 | (Greece) (Liechtenstein) | Alexandros Jakoubovits; Thomas Weirather | 6; 1 | 6; 1 |
| 3 | (Greece) (Liechtenstein) | Charalampos Kapogiannis / Konstantinos Mikos; Robin Forster / Vital Flurin Leuch | 6; 1 | 6; 1 |

==== Montenegro vs. Liechtenstein ====
Montenegro
2
Centro Tennis Cassa di Risparmio, San Marino
24 May 2013
Clay

Liechtenstein
1

| | | | 1 | 2 | 3 |
|---|---|---|---|---|---|
| 1 | (Montenegro) (Liechtenstein) | Igor Saveljić; Timo Kranz | 7; 5 | 6; 3 |
| 2 | (Montenegro) (Liechtenstein) | Ljubomir Čelebić; Thomas Weirather | 6; 4 | 6; 2 |
| 3 | (Montenegro) (Liechtenstein) | Pavle Rogan / Ivan Saveljić; Timo Kranz / Thomas Weirather | 3; 6 | 3; 6 |

=== Pool B ===
==== Norway vs. Malta ====
Norway
3
Centro Tennis Cassa di Risparmio, San Marino
22 May 2013
Clay

Malta
0

| | | | 1 | 2 | 3 |
|---|---|---|---|---|---|
| 1 | (Norway) (Malta) | Stian Boretti; Matthew Asciak | 6; 3 | 7^{7} 6^{3} |
| 2 | (Norway) (Malta) | Joachim Bjerke; Bradley Callus | 6; 0 | 6; 1 |
| 3 | (Norway) (Malta) | Stian Boretti / Erling Tveit; Matthew Asciak / Bradley Callus | 6; 0 | 6; 2 |

==== Norway vs. Iceland ====
Norway
3
Centro Tennis Cassa di Risparmio, San Marino
23 May 2013
Clay

Iceland
0

| | | | 1 | 2 | 3 |
|---|---|---|---|---|---|
| 1 | (Norway) (Iceland) | Stian Boretti; Birkir Gunnarsson | 6; 2 | 6; 1 |
| 2 | (Norway) (Iceland) | Joachim Bjerke; Rafn Bonifacius | 6; 1 | 6; 0 |
| 3 | (Norway) (Iceland) | Joachim Bjerke / Stian Boretti; Rafn Bonifacius / Raj-Kumar Bonifacius | 6; 4 | 6; 2 |

==== Malta vs. Iceland ====
Malta
2
Centro Tennis Cassa di Risparmio, San Marino
24 May 2013
Clay

Iceland
1

| | | | 1 | 2 | 3 |
|---|---|---|---|---|---|
| 1 | (Malta) (Iceland) | Matthew Asciak; Vladimir Ristic | 6; 2 | 6; 0 |
| 2 | (Malta) (Iceland) | Bradley Callus; Birkir Gunnarsson | 4; 6 | 1; 6 |
| 3 | (Malta) (Iceland) | Matthew Asciak / Bernard Cassar Torregiani; Rafn Bonifacius / Birkir Gunnarsson | 6; 4 | 6; 2 |

=== Pool C ===
==== Georgia vs. Armenia ====
Georgia
3
Centro Tennis Cassa di Risparmio, San Marino
22 May 2013
Clay

Armenia
0

| | | | 1 | 2 | 3 |
|---|---|---|---|---|---|
| 1 | (Georgia (country)) (Armenia) | George Tsivadze; Khachatur Khachatryan | 6; 1 | 7; 5 |
| 2 | (Georgia (country)) (Armenia) | Aleksandre Metreveli; Ashot Gevorgyan | 7^{7} 6^{0} | 6; 2 |
| 3 | (Georgia (country)) (Armenia) | Aleksandre Metreveli / George Tsivadze; Khachatur Khachatryan / Sedrak Khachatryan | 6; 2 | 6; 0 |

==== Georgia vs. San Marino ====
Georgia
3
Centro Tennis Cassa di Risparmio, San Marino
23 May 2013
Clay

San Marino
0

| | | | 1 | 2 | 3 |
|---|---|---|---|---|---|
| 1 | (Georgia (country)) (San Marino) | George Tsivadze; Marco De Rossi | 6; 0 | 6; 0 |
| 2 | (Georgia (country)) (San Marino) | Aleksandre Metreveli; Diego Zonzini | 6; 1 | 4; 6 | 6; 0 |
| 3 | (Georgia (country)) (San Marino) | Aleksandre Metreveli / George Tsivadze; Marco De Rossi / Domenico Vicini | 6; 1 | 7; 5 |

==== Armenia vs. San Marino ====
Armenia
0
Centro Tennis Cassa di Risparmio, San Marino
24 May 2013
Clay

San Marino
3

| | | | 1 | 2 | 3 |
|---|---|---|---|---|---|
| 1 | (Armenia) (San Marino) | Sedrak Khachatryan; Marco De Rossi | 4; 6 | 3; 6 |
| 2 | (Armenia) (San Marino) | Khachatur Khachatryan; Diego Zonzini | 4; 6 | 4; 6 |
| 3 | (Armenia) (San Marino) | Mikayel Avetisyan / Khachatur Khachatryan; Marco De Rossi / Domenico Vicini | 2; 6 | 4; 6 |

=== Pool D ===
==== North Macedonia vs. Turkey ====
North Macedonia
3
Centro Tennis Cassa di Risparmio, San Marino
22 May 2013
Clay

Turkey
0

| | | | 1 | 2 | 3 |
|---|---|---|---|---|---|
| 1 | (North Macedonia) (Turkey) | Predrag Rusevski; Cem İlkel | 6; 4 | 7; 5 |
| 2 | (North Macedonia) (Turkey) | Shendrit Deari; Anıl Yüksel | 7; 5 | 6; 4 |
| 3 | (North Macedonia) (Turkey) | Predrag Rusevski / Stefan Micov; Durukan Durmuş / Efe Yurtaçan | 6; 2 | 7^{7} 6^{5} |

==== Albania vs. Azerbaijan ====
Albania
3
Centro Tennis Cassa di Risparmio, San Marino
22 May 2013
Clay

Azerbaijan
0

| | | | 1 | 2 | 3 |
|---|---|---|---|---|---|
| 1 | (Albania) (Azerbaijan) | Genajd Shypheja; Arif Guliyev | 7; 5 | 6; 3 |
| 2 | (Albania) (Azerbaijan) | Flavio Deçe; Aykhan Manafli | 6; 1 | 6; 3 |
| 3 | (Albania) (Azerbaijan) | Flavio Deçe / Rei Pelushi; Arif Guliyev / Aykhan Manafli | 6; 2 | 7^{10} 6^{8} |

==== North Macedonia vs. Albania ====
North Macedonia
3
Centro Tennis Cassa di Risparmio, San Marino
23 May 2013
Clay

Albania
0

| | | | 1 | 2 | 3 |
|---|---|---|---|---|---|
| 1 | (North Macedonia) (Albania) | Stefan Micov; Rei Pelushi | 6; 0 | 6; 0 |
| 2 | (North Macedonia) (Albania) | Shendrit Deari; Flavio Deçe | 6; 0 | 6; 3 |
| 3 | (North Macedonia) (Albania) | David Micevski / Stefan Micov; Kevi Kaceli / Genajd Shypheja | 6; 2 | 6; 2 |

==== Turkey vs. Azerbaijan ====
Turkey
3
Centro Tennis Cassa di Risparmio, San Marino
23 May 2013
Clay

Azerbaijan
0

| | | | 1 | 2 | 3 |
|---|---|---|---|---|---|
| 1 | (Turkey) (Azerbaijan) | Durukan Durmuş; Samir Gafarov | 6; 2 | 6; 0 |
| 2 | (Turkey) (Azerbaijan) | Efe Yurtaçan; Aykhan Manafli | 6; 0 | 6; 0 |
| 3 | (Turkey) (Azerbaijan) | Cem İlkel / Anıl Yüksel; Arif Guliyev / Aykhan Manafli | 6; 0 | 6; 2 |

==== North Macedonia vs. Azerbaijan ====
North Macedonia
3
Centro Tennis Cassa di Risparmio, San Marino
24 May 2013
Clay

Azerbaijan
0

| | | | 1 | 2 | 3 |
|---|---|---|---|---|---|
| 1 | (North Macedonia) (Azerbaijan) | David Micevski; Arif Guliyev | 6; 0 | 6; 1 |
| 2 | (North Macedonia) (Azerbaijan) | Stefan Micov; Aykhan Manafli | 6; 1 | 6; 0 |
| 3 | (North Macedonia) (Azerbaijan) | David Micevski / Stefan Micov; Arif Guliyev / Aykhan Manafli | 6; 1 | 6; 0 |

==== Turkey vs. Albania ====
Turkey
3
Centro Tennis Cassa di Risparmio, San Marino
24 May 2013
Clay

Albania
0

| | | | 1 | 2 | 3 |
|---|---|---|---|---|---|
| 1 | (Turkey) (Albania) | Durukan Durmuş; Genajd Shypheja | 6; 2 | 6; 0 |
| 2 | (Turkey) (Albania) | Anıl Yüksel; Flavio Deçe | 6; 2 | 6; 1 |
| 3 | (Turkey) (Albania) | Cem İlkel / Efe Yurtaçan; Kevi Kaceli / Rei Pelushi | 6; 1 | 6; 0 |

== Play-offs ==
=== Promotion ===
==== Greece vs. North Macedonia ====
Greece
2
Centro Tennis Cassa di Risparmio, San Marino
25 May 2013
Clay

North Macedonia
1

| | | | 1 | 2 | 3 |
|---|---|---|---|---|---|
| 1 | (Greece) (North Macedonia) | Markos Kalovelonis; Predrag Rusevski | 6; 4 | 4; 6 | 3; 6 |
| 2 | (Greece) (North Macedonia) | Alexandros Jakoubovits; Shendrit Deari | 7; 5 | 6; 2 |
| 3 | (Greece) (North Macedonia) | Alexandros Jakoubovits / Markos Kalovelonis; Predrag Rusevski / Stefan Micov | 6; 3 | 6; 4 |

==== Norway vs. Georgia ====
Norway
2
Centro Tennis Cassa di Risparmio, San Marino
25 May 2013
Clay

Georgia
0

| | | | 1 | 2 | 3 |
|---|---|---|---|---|---|---|
| 1 | (Norway) (Georgia (country)) | Stian Boretti; George Tsivadze | 6; 2 | 7; 5 |
| 2 | (Norway) (Georgia (country)) | Joachim Bjerke; Aleksandre Metreveli | 6; 4 | 6; 1 |
| 3 | (Norway) (Georgia (country)) | Stian Boretti / Erling Tveit; Aleksandre Metreveli / George Tsivadze | | | | not played |

=== 5th to 8th play-offs ===
==== Montenegro vs. San Marino ====
Montenegro
1
Centro Tennis Cassa di Risparmio, San Marino
25 May 2013
Clay

San Marino
1

| | | | 1 | 2 | 3 |
|---|---|---|---|---|---|---|
| 1 | (Montenegro) (San Marino) | Pavle Rogan; Marco De Rossi | 4; 6 | 5; 7 |
| 2 | (Montenegro) (San Marino) | Igor Saveljić; Diego Zonzini | 6; 2 | 6; 2 |
| 3 | (Montenegro) (San Marino) | Igor Saveljić / Ivan Saveljić; Marco De Rossi / Domenico Vicini | | | | not played |

==== Malta vs. Turkey ====
Malta
1
Centro Tennis Cassa di Risparmio, San Marino
25 May 2013
Clay

Turkey
1

| | | | 1 | 2 | 3 |
|---|---|---|---|---|---|---|
| 1 | (Malta) (Turkey) | Matthew Asciak; Durukan Durmuş | 6; 0 | 6; 1 |
| 2 | (Malta) (Turkey) | Bradley Callus; Cem İlkel | 0; 6 | 2; 6 |
| 3 | (Malta) (Turkey) | Bernard Cassar Torregiani / Raphael Sammut; Anıl Yüksel / Efe Yurtaçan | | | | not played |

=== 9th to 12th play-offs ===
==== Liechtenstein vs. Albania ====
Liechtenstein
2
Centro Tennis Cassa di Risparmio, San Marino
25 May 2013
Clay

Albania
0

| | | | 1 | 2 | 3 |
|---|---|---|---|---|---|---|
| 1 | (Liechtenstein) (Albania) | Timo Kranz; Rei Pelushi | 6; 0 | 6; 2 |
| 2 | (Liechtenstein) (Albania) | Thomas Weirather; Flavio Deçe | 6; 1 | 6; 1 |
| 3 | (Liechtenstein) (Albania) | Timo Kranz / Thomas Weirather; Flavio Deçe / Genajd Shypheja | | | | not played |

==== Iceland vs. Armenia ====
Iceland
1
Centro Tennis Cassa di Risparmio, San Marino
25 May 2013
Clay

Armenia
1

| | | | 1 | 2 | 3 |
|---|---|---|---|---|---|---|
| 1 | (Iceland) (Armenia) | Birkir Gunnarsson; Mikayel Avetisyan | 6; 3 | 6; 0 |
| 2 | (Iceland) (Armenia) | Rafn Bonifacius; Khachatur Khachatryan | 3; 6 | 1; 6 |
| 3 | (Iceland) (Armenia) | Rafn Bonifacius / Birkir Gunnarsson; Mikayel Avetisyan / Khachatur Khachatryan | | | | not played |

== Final standings ==
| Rank | Team |
|---|---|
| 1 | Greece |
| 1 | Norway |
| 3 | Georgia |
| 3 | North Macedonia |
| 5 | Malta |
| 5 | Montenegro |
| 5 | San Marino |
| 5 | Turkey |
| 9 | Liechtenstein |
| 10 | Armenia |
| 10 | Iceland |
| 12 | Albania |
| 13 | Azerbaijan |

- Greece and Norway promoted to Group II in 2014.

=== Group III Africa ===
- Venue: Smash Tennis Academy, Cairo, Egypt (outdoor clay)
- Date: 15–18 May

| Rank | Team |
|---|---|
| 1 | Egypt |
| 1 | Morocco |
| 3 | Madagascar |
| 3 | Zimbabwe |
| 5 | Algeria |
| 5 | Ghana |
| 7 | Namibia |
| 7 | Nigeria |
| 9 | Botswana |
| 9 | Cameroon |
| 11 | Kenya |
| 11 | Rwanda |
| 13 | Zambia |

- Egypt and Morocco promoted to Group II in 2014.
