= 2016 Springfield Lasers season =

- World TeamTennis: 5th place

Record
- 2016 record: 4 wins, 8 losses
- Home record: 3 wins, 3 losses
- Road record: 1 win, 5 losses
- Games won–lost: 231–250

Team info
- Owner(s): Springfield-Greene County Park Board represented by John Cooper
- President/CEO: Bob Belote
- General manager: Paul Nahon
- Coach: John-Laffnie de Jager
- Stadium: Mediacom Stadium at Cooper Tennis Complex (capacity: 2,500)

The 2016 Springfield Lasers season was the 21st season of the franchise in World TeamTennis (WTT). The Lasers finished with 4 wins and 8 losses, fifth in the WTT standings, and missed the postseason for the second consecutive year. The team featured Michaëlla Krajicek, who won the 2016 WTT Female Rookie of the Year Award.

== Season recap ==
=== Draft ===
At the WTT Draft on March 25, 2016, the Lasers protected the top-ranked American player John Isner in the first round of the marquee player portion of the draft and passed on making a second-round selection. In the roster player portion of the draft, the Lasers made a trade with the expansion New York Empire, which was interested in selecting Christina McHale. In the trade, the Lasers gave the Empire the first overall selection in the roster player portion of the draft along with the first pick in the fourth round in exchange for the third pick in each of the first and third rounds. The Lasers did not protect any players in the roster portion of the draft. They selected Daniel Nestor, Benjamin Becker, Daria Gavrilova and Michaëlla Krajicek. Nestor was the only one of the four with WTT experience. He was WTT Male Rookie of the Year playing for the Sacramento Capitals in 2003, and WTT Male Most Valuable Player as a member of the Philadelphia Freedoms in 2006. The Lasers elected not to choose a roster-exempt player in the fifth round.

=== Parmentier replaces Gavrilova ===
Daria Gavrilova was selected to represent Australia at the 2016 Summer Olympics on July 1, 2016. She was replaced on the roster by Pauline Parmentier on July 23, 2016.

=== Nestor selected to Canadian Olympic team ===
On July 21, 2016, Daniel Nestor was selected to represent Canada at the 2016 Summer Olympics, playing men's doubles in place of Milos Raonic, who withdrew citing concerns about the Zica virus. To fill the void created by Nestor's departure, the Lasers signed Jean Andersen and Eric Butorac as substitute players on July 26, 2016. Andersen previously played for the Lasers in 2011 and 2014.

=== Lasers hand Freedoms first two losses ===
After starting the season with four straight losses, the Lasers faced the undefeated Philadelphia Freedoms on the road on August 4, 2016. Two of the Lasers' four losses had already come at the hands of the Freedoms. Jean Andersen and Benjamin Becker got the Lasers started by winning a tiebreaker in the opening set of men's doubles. Michaëlla Krajicek and Pauline Parmentier followed by getting an early break in the women's doubles set that led to a 5–3 set win and a 10–7 lead in the match for the Lasers. Becker lost a tiebreaker to Lukáš Lacko in the third set of men's singles to cut the lead to 14–12. Parmentier raced to a 3–0 lead in the fourth set of women's singles, before Naomi Broady broke back to send the set to a tiebreaker. Parmentier survived a set point down 3–4 in the tiebreaker on Broady's serve and then hit a forehand winner on the set's deciding point to push the Lasers' lead to 19–16. Becker and Krajicek sealed the match in mixed doubles by holding all their service games and breaking Broady once to win the set, 5–3, and give the Lasers a 24–19 victory.

The Lasers and Freedoms met again the following evening in Springfield. After dropping the opening set of men's doubles in a tiebreaker, the Lasers took control of the match by winning the next three sets led by Krajicek. She teamed with Parmentier to take the women's doubles, 5–3, then with Becker to take the mixed doubles by the same score. In the fourth set of women's singles, Krajicek topped Samantha Crawford, 5–2, to give the Lasers a 19–13 lead. In the final set of men's singles, Lacko earned a break against Becker and won the set, 5–3, to send the math to extended play with the Lasers leading, 22–18. Becker held serve, 4–1, in the first game of extended play to clinch a 23–18 win for the Lasers.

=== Elimination from postseason contention ===
The Lasers were eliminated from postseason contention with a record of 2 wins and 7 losses on August 10, 2016, when they lost to the Orange County Breakers, 22–19, in extended play. It is the second consecutive season the Lasers have missed the postseason.

=== Season finale ===
The Lasers met the New York Empire in the season finale for both teams at home on August 13, 2016. The loser of the match would finish last in WTT. Benjamin Becker and Eric Butorac opened the match by winning a tiebreaker in men's doubles. Michaëlla Krajicek and Pauline Parmentier followed with a 5–3 set win in women's doubles. Krajicek and Butorac teamed for a 5–1 mixed doubles set win that gave the Lasers a 15–8 lead. After dropping the fourth set of women's singles, the Lasers took a 17–13 lead to the final set. Marcus Willis won the men's singles set in a tiebreaker to send the match to extended play with the Lasers leading 21–18. After Willis won the first game of extended play, Becker won the second to secure a 22–19 victory and a fifth-place finish.

=== Rookie of the Year Award ===
Michaëlla Krajicek was named 2016 WTT Female Rookie of the Year. Krajicek was tied for fifth in the league with teammate Pauline Parmentier in winning percentage in women's doubles and was also fifth in mixed doubles.

== Event chronology ==
- March 25, 2016: The Lasers protected John Isner and selected Daniel Nestor, Benjamin Becker, Daria Gavrilova and Michaëlla Krajicek at the WTT Draft. The Lasers left Andre Begemann, Alison Riske, Varvara Lepchenko, Sachia Vickery, Anna-Lena Grönefeld and Michael Russell unprotected.
- July 23, 2016: The Lasers signed Pauline Parmentier as a roster player to replace Daria Gavrilova.
- July 26, 2016: The Lasers signed Jean Andersen and Eric Butorac as substitute players.
- August 10, 2016: The Lasers were eliminated from postseason contention with a record of 2 wins and 7 losses, when they lost to the Orange County Breakers, 22–19, in extended play. It is the second consecutive season the Lasers have missed the postseason.

== Draft picks ==
Since the Lasers had the worst record in WTT in 2014, they had the first selection in each round of the draft. WTT conducted its 2016 draft on March 25, in Key Biscayne, Florida. in the roster player portion of the draft, the Lasers traded the first overall selection along with the first pick in the fourth round to the New York Empire in exchange for the third pick in each of the first and third rounds. The selections made by the Lasers are shown in the table below.

Draft type	Round	No.	Overall	Player chosen	Prot?
Marquee	1	1	1	(United States) John Isner	Y
Marquee	2	1	7	Pass	–
Roster	1	3	3	(Canada) Daniel Nestor	N
Roster	2	1	7	(Germany) Benjamin Becker	N
Roster	3	1	13	(Australia) Daria Gavrilova	N
Roster	3	3	15	(Netherlands) Michaëlla Krajicek	N
Roster	5	1	25	Pass	–

== Match log ==
Legend
Lasers Win	Lasers Loss
Home team in CAPS

Match	Date	Venue and location	Result and details	Record
1	July 31	Mediacom Stadium at Cooper Tennis Complex; Springfield, Missouri	Philadelphia Freedoms 23, SPRINGFIELD LASERS 17 * MD: Lukáš Lacko/Fabrice Martin (Freedoms) 5, Jean Andersen/Benjamin Becker (Lasers) 3 * WS: Pauline Parmentier (Lasers) 5, Naomi Broady (Freedoms) 4 * MS: Benjamin Becker (Lasers) 5, Lukáš Lacko (Freedoms) 4 * WD: Naomi Broady/Samantha Crawford (Freedoms) 5, Michaëlla Krajicek/Pauline Parmentier (Lasers) 1 * XD: Naomi Broady/Fabrice Martin (Freedoms) 5, Michaëlla Krajicek/Jean Andersen (Lasers) 3	0–1
2	August 1	Kastles Stadium at the Charles E. Smith Center; Washington, District of Columbia	WASHINGTON KASTLES 22, Springfield Lasers 16 * MS: Benjamin Becker (Lasers) 5, Denis Kudla (Kastles) 3 * WS: Madison Brengle (Kastles) 5, Pauline Parmentier (Lasers) 0 * XD: Leander Paes/Martina Hingis (Kastles) 5, Jean Andersen/Michaëlla Krajicek (Lasers) 2 *** Leander Paes substituted for Bob Bryan at 1–0 * WD: Michaëlla Krajicek/Pauline Parmentier (Lasers) 5, Martina Hingis/Anastasia Rodionova (Kastles) 4 * MD: Bob Bryan/Mike Bryan (Kastles) 5, Jean Andersen/Benjamin Becker (Lasers) 4	0–2
3	August 2	The Pavilion; Radnor Township, Pennsylvania	PHILADELPHIA FREEDOMS 20, Springfield Lasers 16 * MS: Benjamin Becker (Lasers) 5, Lukáš Lacko (Freedoms) 3 * WD: Michaëlla Krajicek/Pauline Parmentier (Lasers) 5, Caroline Wozniacki/Naomi Broady (Freedoms) 2 * MD: Lukáš Lacko/Fabrice Martin (Freedoms) 5, Jean Andersen/Benjamin Becker (Lasers) 2 * WS: Caroline Wozniacki (Freedoms) 5, Pauline Parmentier (Lasers) 1 * XD: Naomi Broady/Fabrice Martin (Freedoms) 5, Michaëlla Krajicek/Jean Andersen (Lasers) 3	0–3
4	August 3	Forest Hills Stadium; New York City, New York	NEW YORK EMPIRE 19, Springfield Lasers 15 * MD: Noah Rubin/Neal Skupski (Empire) 5, Benjamin Becker/Jean Andersen (Lasers) 2 * WS: Pauline Parmentier (Lasers) 5, Christina McHale (Empire) 0 * MS: Benjamin Becker (Lasers) 5, Noah Rubin (Empire) 4 * WD: Christina McHale/María Irigoyen (Empire) 5, Michaëlla Krajicek/Pauline Parmentier (Lasers) 1 * XD: María Irigoyen/Neal Skupski (Empire) 5, Michaëlla Krajicek/Jean Andersen (Lasers) 2	0–4
5	August 4	The Pavilion; Radnor Township, Pennsylvania	Springfield Lasers 24, PHILADELPHIA FREEDOMS 19 * MD: Jean Andersen/Benjamin Becker (Lasers) 5, Lukáš Lacko/Fabrice Martin (Freedoms) 4 * WD: Michaëlla Krajicek/Pauline Parmentier (Lasers) 5, Naomi Broady/Samantha Crawford (Freedoms) 3 * MS: Lukáš Lacko (Freedoms) 5, Benjamin Becker (Lasers) 4 * WS: Pauline Parmentier (Lasers) 5, Naomi Broady (Freedoms) 4 * XD: Benjamin Becker/Michaëlla Krajicek (Lasers) 5, Naomi Broady/Fabrice Martin (Freedoms) 3	1–4
6	August 6	Mediacom Stadium at Cooper Tennis Complex; Springfield, Missouri	SPRINGFIELD LASERS 23, Philadelphia Freedoms 18 (extended play) * MD: Fabrice Martin/Lukáš Lacko (Freedoms) 5, Benjamin Becker/Jean Andersen (Lasers) 4 * WD: Michaëlla Krajicek/Pauline Parmentier (Lasers) 5, Naomi Broady/Samantha Crawford (Freedoms) 3 * XD: Benjamin Becker/Michaëlla Krajicek (Lasers) 5, Fabrice Martin/Naomi Broady (Freedoms) 3 * WS: Michaëlla Krajicek (Lasers) 5, Samantha Crawford (Freedoms) 2 * MS: Lukáš Lacko (Freedoms) 5, Benjamin Becker (Lasers) 3 * EP - MS: Benjamin Becker (Lasers) 1, Lukáš Lacko (Freedoms) 0	2–4
7	August 7	Omni La Costa Resort and Spa; Carlsbad, California	SAN DIEGO AVIATORS 22, Springfield Lasers 19 (extended play) * MS: Ryan Harrison (Aviators) 5, Benjamin Becker (Lasers) 2 * WS: Shelby Rogers (Aviators) 5, Pauline Parmentier (Lasers) 3 * MD: Ryan Harrison/Raven Klaasen (Aviators) 5, Benjamin Becker/Jean Andersen (Lasers) 3 * WD: Michaëlla Krajicek/Pauline Parmentier (Lasers) 5, Darija Jurak/Shelby Rogers (Aviators) 4 * XD: Benjamin Becker/Michaëlla Krajicek (Lasers) 5, Raven Klaasen/Darija Jurak (Aviators) 2 * EP - XD: Raven Klaasen/Darija Jurak (Aviators) 1, Benjamin Becker/Michaëlla Krajicek (Lasers) 1	2–5
8	August 9	Breakers Stadium at the Newport Beach Tennis Club; Newport Beach, California	ORANGE COUNTY BREAKERS 24, Springfield Lasers 17 * MD: Scott Lipsky/Dennis Novikov (Breakers) 5, Benjamin Becker/Jean Andersen (Lasers) 2 * WS: Nicole Gibbs (Breakers) 5, Pauline Parmentier (Lasers) 2 * MS: Benjamin Becker (Lasers) 5, Dennis Novikov (Breakers) 4 * XD: Scott Lipsky/Alla Kudryavtseva (Breakers) 5, Jean Andersen/Michaëlla Krajicek (Lasers) 4 * WD: Nicole Gibbs/Alla Kudryavtseva (Breakers) 5, Michaëlla Krajicek/Pauline Parmentier (Lasers) 4	2–6
9	August 10	Mediacom Stadium at Cooper Tennis Complex; Springfield, Missouri	Orange County Breakers 22, SPRINGFIELD LASERS 19 (extended play) * MD: Benjamin Becker/Eric Butorac (Lasers) 5, Scott Lipsky/Dennis Novikov (Breakers) 4 * WD: Nicole Gibbs/Alla Kudryavtseva (Breakers) 5, Michaëlla Krajicek/Pauline Parmentier (Lasers) 1 * XD: Eric Butorac/Michaëlla Krajicek (Lasers) 5, Scott Lipsky/Alla Kudryavtseva (Breakers) 3 * WS: Nicole Gibbs (Breakers) 5, Michaëlla Krajicek (Lasers) 3 * MS: Benjamin Becker (Lasers) 5, Dennis Novikov (Breakers) 4 * EP - MS: Dennis Novikov (Breakers) 1, Benjamin Becker (Lasers) 0	2–7
10	August 11	Mediacom Stadium at Cooper Tennis Complex; Springfield, Missouri	SPRINGFIELD LASERS 23, San Diego Aviators 21 (extended play) * MD: Ryan Harrison/Raven Klaasen (Aviators) 5, Eric Butorac/John Isner (Lasers) 3 * WD: Michaëlla Krajicek/Pauline Parmentier (Lasers) 5, Darija Jurak/Shelby Rogers (Aviators) 4 * XD: Eric Butorac/Michaëlla Krajicek (Lasers) 5, Raven Klaasen/Darija Jurak (Aviators) 2 * WS: Michaëlla Krajicek (Lasers) 5, Shelby Rogers (Aviators) 4 * MS: Ryan Harrison (Aviators) 5, John Isner (Lasers) 4 * EP - MS: John Isner (Lasers) 1, Ryan Harrison (Aviators) 1	3–7
11	August 12	Mediacom Stadium at Cooper Tennis Complex; Springfield, Missouri	Washington Kastles 21, SPRINGFIELD LASERS 20 * MS: Benjamin Becker (Lasers) 5, Sam Groth (Kastles) 3 * WD: Michaëlla Krajicek/Pauline Parmentier (Lasers) 5, Madison Brengle/Andreja Klepač (Kastles) 3 * MD: Sam Groth/Treat Huey (Kastles) 5, Benjamin Becker/Eric Butorac (Lasers) 3 * WS: Madison Brengle (Kastles) 5, Michaëlla Krajicek (Lasers) 3 * XD: Treat Huey/Andreja Klepač (Kastles) 5, Eric Butorac/Michaëlla Krajicek (Lasers) 4 *** Treat Huey substituted for Sam Groth at 3–3	3–8
12	August 13	Mediacom Stadium at Cooper Tennis Complex; Springfield, Missouri	SPRINGFIELD LASERS 22, New York Empire 19 (extended play) * MD: Benjamin Becker/Eric Butorac (Lasers) 5, Neal Skupski/Marcus Willis (Empire) 4 * WD: Michaëlla Krajicek/Pauline Parmentier (Lasers) 5, María Irigoyen/Christina McHale (Empire) 3 * XD: Michaëlla Krajicek/Eric Butorac (Lasers) 5, María Irigoyen/Neal Skupski (Empire) 1 * WS: Christina McHale (Empire) 5, Michaëlla Krajicek (Lasers) 2 * MS: Marcus Willis (Empire) 5, Benjamin Becker (Lasers) 4 * EP - MS: Benjamin Becker (Lasers) 1, Marcus Willis (Empire) 1	4–8

== Team personnel ==
=== On-court personnel ===
- (South Africa) John-Laffnie de Jager – Head Coach
- (South Africa) Jean Andersen
- (Germany) Benjamin Becker
- (United States) Eric Butorac
- (Australia) Daria Gavrilova (Note: Schedule conflict with Olympics, did not play.)
- (United States) John Isner
- (Netherlands) Michaëlla Krajicek
- (Canada) Daniel Nestor (Note: Schedule conflict with Olympics, did not play.)
- (France) Pauline Parmentier

=== Front office ===
- John Cooper representing Springfield-Greene County Park Board – Owner
- Bob Belote – Director
- Paul Nahon – General Manager

== Statistics ==
Players are listed in order of their game-winning percentage provided they played in at least 40% of the Lasers' games in that event, which is the WTT minimum for qualification for league leaders in individual statistical categories.

Men's singles

Player	GP	GW	GL	PCT	A	DF	BPW	BPP	BP%	3APW	3APP	3AP%
Benjamin Becker	97	50	47	.515	21	9	6	17	.353	7	15	.467
John Isner	11	5	6	.455	7	1	0	0	–	1	1	1.000
Total	108	55	53	.509	28	10	6	17	.353	8	16	.500

Women's singles

Player	GP	GW	GL	PCT	A	DF	BPW	BPP	BP%	3APW	3APP	3AP%
Michaëlla Krajicek	39	18	21	.462	6	14	4	15	.267	3	11	.272
Pauline Parmentier	49	21	28	.429	5	6	6	21	.286	3	10	.300
Total	88	39	49	.443	11	20	10	36	.278	6	21	.286

Men's doubles

Player	GP	GW	GL	PCT	A	DF	BPW	BPP	BP%	3APW	3APP	3AP%
Benjamin Becker	90	38	52	.422	6	7	1	6	.167	9	18	.500
Jean Andersen	64	25	39	.391	0	5	1	5	.200	9	16	.563
Eric Butorac	34	16	18	.471	4	4	0	2	.000	2	6	.333
John Isner	8	3	5	.375	1	1	0	1	.000	2	4	.500
Total	98	41	57	.418	11	17	1	7	.143	11	22	.500

Women's doubles

Player	GP	GW	GL	PCT	A	DF	BPW	BPP	BP%	3APW	3APP	3AP%
Michaëlla Krajicek	93	47	46	.505	8	12	7	23	.304	16	24	.667
Pauline Parmentier	93	47	46	.505	2	12	7	23	.304	16	24	.667
Total	93	47	46	.505	10	24	7	23	.304	16	24	.667

Mixed doubles

Player	GP	GW	GL	PCT	A	DF	BPW	BPP	BP%	3APW	3APP	3AP%
Michaëlla Krajicek	94	49	45	.521	2	6	12	19	.632	9	12	.750
Jean Andersen	39	14	25	.359	3	3	3	5	.600	4	6	.667
Benjamin Becker	25	16	9	.640	2	0	5	7	.714	3	4	.750
Eric Butorac	30	19	11	.633	8	2	4	7	.571	2	2	1.000
Total	94	49	45	.521	15	11	12	19	.632	9	12	.750

Team totals

Event	GP	GW	GL	PCT	A	DF	BPW	BPP	BP%	3APW	3APP	3AP%
Men's singles	108	55	53	.509	28	10	6	17	.353	8	16	.500
Women's singles	88	39	49	.443	11	20	10	36	.278	6	21	.286
Men's doubles	98	41	57	.418	11	17	1	7	.143	11	22	.500
Women's doubles	93	47	46	.505	10	24	7	23	.304	16	24	.667
Mixed doubles	94	49	45	.521	15	11	12	19	.632	9	12	.750
Total	481	231	250	.480	75	82	36	102	.353	50	95	.526

== Transactions ==
- March 25, 2016: The Lasers protected John Isner and selected Daniel Nestor, Benjamin Becker, Daria Gavrilova and Michaëlla Krajicek at the WTT Draft. The Lasers left Andre Begemann, Alison Riske, Varvara Lepchenko, Sachia Vickery, Anna-Lena Grönefeld and Michael Russell unprotected.
- July 23, 2016: The Lasers signed Pauline Parmentier as a roster player to replace Daria Gavrilova.
- July 26, 2016: The Lasers signed Jean Andersen and Eric Butorac as substitute players.

== Individual honors and achievements ==
Michaëlla Krajicek was named 2016 WTT Female Rookie of the Year. Krajicek was tied for fifth in the league with teammate Pauline Parmentier in winning percentage in women's doubles and was also fifth in mixed doubles.

Benjamin Becker was second in WTT in winning percentage in men's singles.

== See also ==
- Sports in Missouri
