= 2010 Rogers Cup – Men's singles qualifying =

This article shows the qualifying draw for the 2010 Rogers Cup.

== Players ==
=== Seeds ===
1. (Kazakhstan) Andrey Golubev (first round)
2. (Chinese Taipei) Lu Yen-hsun (qualified)
3. (Uzbekistan) Denis Istomin (qualified)
4. (Finland) Jarkko Nieminen (qualified)
5. (Switzerland) Marco Chiudinelli (first round)
6. (France) Florent Serra (first round)
7. (France) Arnaud Clément (first round)
8. (Ukraine) Illya Marchenko (qualified)
9. (United States) Michael Russell (qualified)
10. (South Africa) Kevin Anderson (qualified)
11. (Poland) Michał Przysiężny (first round)
12. (Italy) Fabio Fognini (qualified)
13. (France) Paul-Henri Mathieu (qualifying competition) (lucky loser)
14. (India) Somdev Devvarman (qualifying competition) (lucky loser)

=== Qualifiers ===
1. (South Africa) Kevin Anderson
2. (Italy) Fabio Fognini
3. (Uzbekistan) Denis Istomin
4. (Finland) Jarkko Nieminen
5. (Ukraine) Illya Marchenko
6. (United States) Michael Russell
7. (Chinese Taipei) Lu Yen-hsun

=== Lucky losers ===
1. (India) Somdev Devvarman
2. (France) Paul-Henri Mathieu

== Results ==
=== First qualifier ===
First round
1 | (Kazakhstan) Andrey Golubev | 6 | 3
(United States) Tim Smyczek | 7^{7} | 6
(Slovakia) Ivo Klec | 3 | 3
10 | (South Africa) Kevin Anderson | 6 | 6

Qualifying competition
(United States) Tim Smyczek | 2 | 4
10 | (South Africa) Kevin Anderson | 6 | 6

=== Second qualifier ===
First round
2 | (Chinese Taipei) Lu Yen-hsun | 6 | 6
(Serbia) Ilija Bozoljac | 2 | 3
(Romania) Marius Copil | 7 | 6
11 | (Poland) Michał Przysiężny | 6^{3} | 4

Qualifying competition
2 | (Chinese Taipei) Lu Yen-hsun | 7 | 5 | 6
(Romania) Marius Copil | 6^{5} | 7 | 3

=== Third qualifier ===
First round
3 | (Uzbekistan) Denis Istomin | 7 | 6
(Paraguay) Ramón Delgado | 6^{4} | 4
WC | (Canada) Pavel Krainik | 0 | 1
14 | (India) Somdev Devvarman | 6 | 6

Qualifying competition
3 | (Uzbekistan) Denis Istomin | 4 | 6 | 7
14 | (India) Somdev Devvarman | 6 | 3 | 6^{10}

=== Fourth qualifier ===
First round
4 | (Finland) Jarkko Nieminen | 6 | 6
Alt | (Slovenia) Grega Žemlja | 3 | 3
WC | (Canada) Zachary White | 2 | 2
13 | (France) Paul-Henri Mathieu | 6 | 6

Qualifying competition
4 | (Finland) Jarkko Nieminen | 6 | 4 | 7
13 | (France) Paul-Henri Mathieu | 3 | 6 | 5

=== Fifth qualifier ===
First round
5 | (Switzerland) Marco Chiudinelli | 6 | 1 | 4
(Colombia) Carlos Salamanca | 4 | 6 | 6
Alt | (Canada) Vasek Pospisil | 3 | 4
8 | (Ukraine) Illya Marchenko | 6 | 6

Qualifying competition
(Colombia) Carlos Salamanca | 3 | 6^{2}
8 | (Ukraine) Illya Marchenko | 6 | 7

=== Sixth qualifier ===
First round
6 | (France) Florent Serra | 3 | 6^{3}
Alt | (Canada) Philip Bester | 6 | 7
(Canada) Steven Diez | 6 | 3 | 1
9 | (United States) Michael Russell | 2 | 6 | 6

Qualifying competition
Alt | (Canada) Philip Bester | 2 | 2
9 | (United States) Michael Russell | 6 | 6

=== Seventh qualifier ===
First round
7 | (France) Arnaud Clément | 6^{5} | 2
(United States) Michael Yani | 7 | 6
WC | (Canada) Érik Chvojka | 2 | 4
12 | (Italy) Fabio Fognini | 6 | 6

Qualifying competition
(United States) Michael Yani | 4 | 3
12 | (Italy) Fabio Fognini | 6 | 6
