= Ilija Bozoljac =

Serbian tennis player and coach

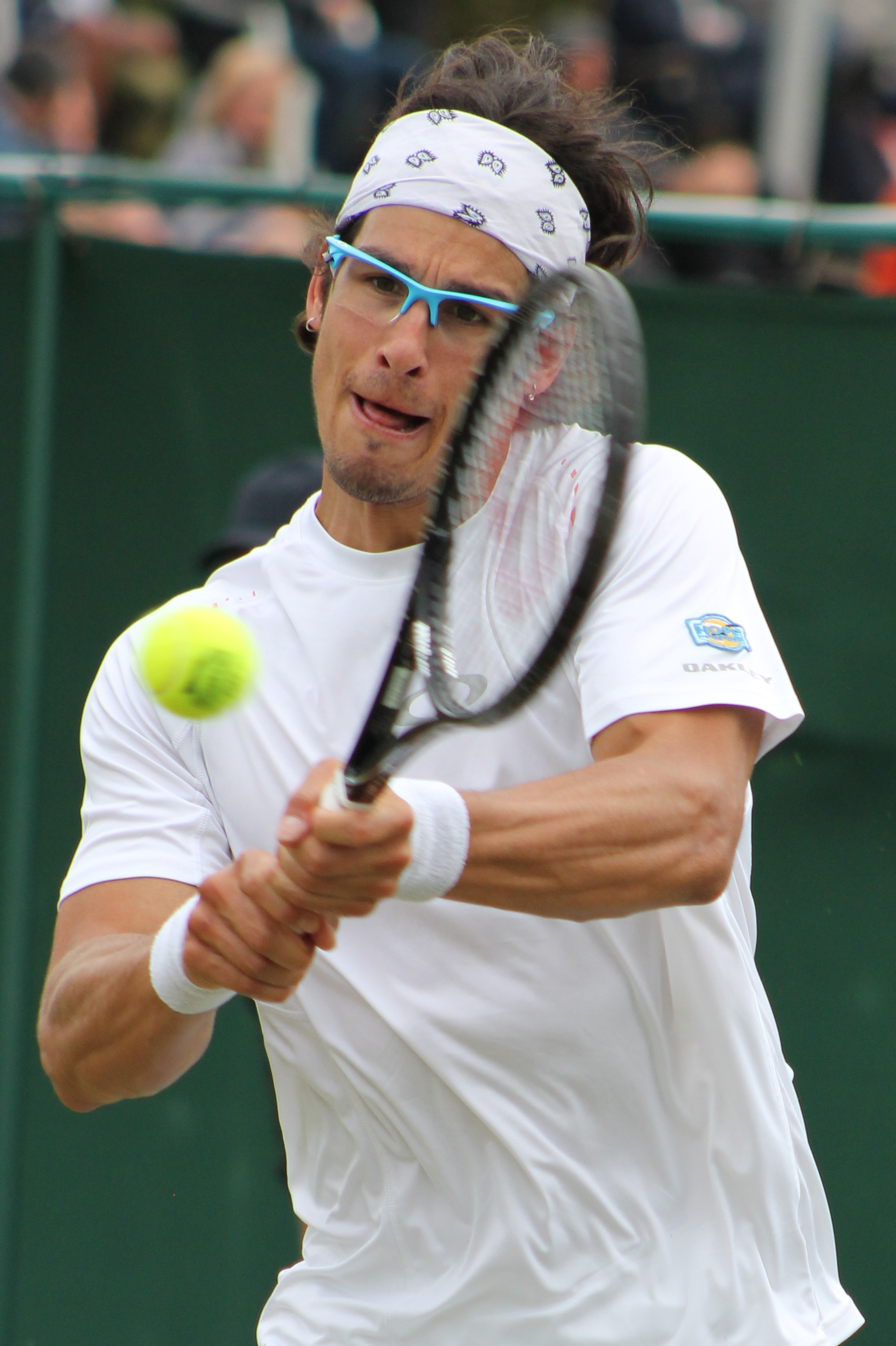
- Country (sports): Yugoslavia (2002–2003); Serbia and Montenegro (2003–2006); Serbia (2006–2018)
- Residence: Belgrade, Serbia
- Born: 2 August 1985 (age 40) Aleksandrovac, SR Serbia, SFR Yugoslavia
- Height: 1.93 m (6 ft 4 in)
- Turned pro: 2002
- Retired: 2018
- Plays: Right-handed (two-handed both sides, occasionally one-handed forehand)
- Coach: Daniel Meyers
- Prize money: $742,198

Singles
- Career record: 11–20
- Career titles: 0
- Highest ranking: No. 101 (29 January 2007)

Grand Slam singles results
- Australian Open: 2R (2007)
- French Open: 2R (2006)
- Wimbledon: 2R (2008, 2010)
- US Open: Q3 (2010, 2011)

Doubles
- Career record: 9–18
- Career titles: 0
- Highest ranking: No. 99 (22 February 2016)

Grand Slam doubles results
- Wimbledon: 2R (2017)

Team competitions
- Davis Cup: F (2013)
- Last updated on: 29 October 2018.

Ilija Bozoljac (Serbian Cyrillic: Илија Бозољац, pronounced [ǐlija boˈzǒːʎats]; born 2 August 1985) is a former Serbian professional tennis player and coach. Bozoljac achieved his career-high singles ranking of world No. 101 on 29 January 2007. In doubles, he reached a career-best ranking of world No. 99 on 22 February 2016. He is commonly known by the nickname Bozo.

== Professional career ==
=== 2006 ===
Bozoljac achieved his best ATP-level result at Zagreb, defeating world No. 170 Dudi Sela in the qualifying rounds. In the main draw, he secured victories over world No. 77 Daniele Bracciali and world No. 34 Feliciano López, before losing in the quarterfinals to world No. 81 Novak Djokovic.

=== 2008 ===
In May, Bozoljac narrowly missed qualifying for the 2008 French Open, losing to no. 75 Eduardo Schwank in the qualifying round.

In June, Bozoljac entered the main draw of the 2008 Wimbledon Championships as a lucky loser. He had defeated Nick Monroe and Robert Smeets in qualifying but lost to Stefano Galvani in five sets.

=== 2010 ===
Bozoljac qualified for Wimbledon and progressed to the second round, where he was defeated in four tight sets by defending champion Roger Federer.

He was a reserve player on the Serbia Davis Cup team when they won the Davis Cup title.

=== 2013 ===
Bozoljac began 2013 by returning to the ITF Men's circuit, taking three singles titles in the opening three months.

In April, Ilija and his doubles partner Nenad Zimonjić beat Bob and Mike Bryan in the Davis Cup World Group quarterfinals against the United States, winning 7–6^{(5)}, 7–6^{(1)}, 5–7, 4–6, 15–13 in a performance described by Sports Illustrated as "Bozo goes Beast Mode...there was Bozoljac playing out of his mind in a five-set win that left everyone shaking their heads". Bozoljac was praised by the Bryan brothers and by U.S. team captain Jim Courier, who said "Let's all tip our hats to his performance. We had him 15-30 a couple times, and the guy came up with some incredible shots."

== Style of play ==
Bozoljac was known for his powerful serve, which could reach speeds of up to 245 km/h (152 mph), as well as his aggressive groundstrokes. His playing style was distinctive, often alternating between a double-handed forehand and a single-handed backhand. A back injury later forced him to moderate his serve, though he continued to exceed 200 km/h (120 mph) during his career.

== Personal life ==
Bozoljac was born on 2 August 1985, in Aleksandrovac, Serbia, to Jelena and Miroljub Bozoljac. He started playing tennis in TK Partizan in Belgrade and turned pro in 2002. He has been married to Andrijana Basarić since 2011, and they have two daughters named Lola (b. 2012) and Nika (b. 2015). They live in Belgrade, Serbia.

== Team competition finals ==
Result	No.	Date	Team competition	Surface	Partner/Team	Opponents	Score
Loss	1.	Nov 2013	Davis Cup, Belgrade, Serbia	Hard (i)	(Serbia) Novak Djokovic (Serbia) Dušan Lajović (Serbia) Nenad Zimonjić	(Czech Republic) Tomáš Berdych (Czech Republic) Radek Štěpánek (Czech Republic) Lukáš Rosol (Czech Republic) Jan Hájek	2–3

== ATP Challenger Tour and ITF Futures finals ==
=== Singles: 25 (13–12) ===
Legend
ATP Challenger Tour (4–10)
ITF Futures (9–2)

Result	No.	Date	Tournament	Surface	Opponent	Score
Loss	1.	22 August 2005	Bukhara, Uzbekistan	Hard	(Uzbekistan) Denis Istomin	4–6, 7–6^{(7–2)}, 5–6 ret.
Loss	2.	10 July 2006	Poznań, Poland	Clay	(Czech Republic) Jan Hájek	4–6, 3–6
Win	3.	4 September 2006	Donetsk, Ukraine	Clay	(Czech Republic) Tomáš Cakl	6–4, 3–6, 7–5
Loss	4.	22 October 2007	Rimouski, Canada	Carpet (i)	(United States) Brendan Evans	7–6^{(7–3)}, 4–6, 4–6
Win	5.	8 September 2008	Ljubljana, Slovenia	Clay	(Italy) Giancarlo Petrazzuolo	6–4, 6–3
Win	6.	15 September 2008	Banja Luka, Bosnia & Herzegovina	Clay	(Spain) Daniel Gimeno-Traver	6–4, 6–4
Loss	7.	1 June 2009	Nottingham, Great Britain	Grass	(United States) Brendan Evans	7–6^{(7–4)}, 4–6, 6–7^{(4–7)}
Loss	8.	12 October 2009	Tiburon, California, United States	Hard	(Japan) Go Soeda	6–3, 3–6, 2–6
Loss	9.	9 November 2009	Knoxville, Tennessee, United States	Hard (i)	(United States) Taylor Dent	3–6, 6–7^{(6–8)}
Loss	10.	15 February 2010	Belgrade, Serbia	Carpet (i)	(Slovakia) Karol Beck	5–7, 6–7^{(4–7)}
Loss	11.	11 July 2011	Aptos, United States	Hard	(Lithuania) Laurynas Grigelis	2–6, 6–7^{(4–7)}
Loss	12.	29 September 2013	Fergana, Uzbekistan	Hard	(Moldova) Radu Albot	6–7^{(9–11)}, 7–6^{(7–3)}, 1–6
Win	13.	15 February 2014	Kolkata, India	Hard	(Russia) Evgeny Donskoy	6–1, 6–1
Loss	14.	20 July 2014	Recanati, Italy	Hard	(Luxembourg) Gilles Müller	1–6, 2–6

=== Doubles: 27 (17–10) ===
Legend
ATP Challenger (15–7)
ITF Futures (2–3)

Result	Date	Tournament	Category	Surface	Partner	Opponents	Score

== Performance timelines ==
Key
W	F	SF	QF	#R	RR	Q#	DNQ	A	NH

(W) winner; (F) finalist; (SF) semifinalist; (QF) quarterfinalist; (#R) rounds 4, 3, 2, 1; (RR) round-robin stage; (Q#) qualification round; (DNQ) did not qualify; (A) absent; (NH) not held; (SR) strike rate (events won / competed); (W–L) win–loss record.
To avoid confusion and double counting, these charts are updated at the conclusion of a tournament or when the player's participation has ended.

=== Singles ===
Current through the 2015 Banja Luka Challenger.

Tournament	2003	2004	2005	2006	2007	2008	2009	2010	2011	2012	2013	2014	2015	W–L
Grand Slam tournaments
Australian Open	A	A	A	Q2	2R	A	Q1	Q1	Q2	A	A	Q2	Q1	1–1
French Open	A	A	A	2R	Q1	Q3	1R	Q2	Q1	A	A	Q1	A	1–2
Wimbledon	A	A	A	Q2	Q1	2R	Q2	2R	Q1	A	A	Q1	A	2–2
US Open	A	A	A	Q2	Q1	Q1	A	Q3	Q3	A	A	Q1	A	0–0
Win–loss	0–0	0–0	0–0	1–1	1–1	1–1	0–1	1–1	0–0	0–0	0–0	0–0	0–0	4–5
National representation
Davis Cup	Z2	A	A	PO	PO	A	1R	Alt	SF	QF	F	1R	A	3–2
Win–loss	1–0	0–0	0–0	0–1	1–0	0–0	1–0	0–0	0–0	0–0	0–0	0–1	0–0	3–2
ATP Masters Series 1000
Indian Wells Masters	A	A	A	A	Q1	A	A	A	A	A	A	A	A	0–0
Monte-Carlo Masters	A	A	A	A	Q2	A	A	A	A	A	A	A	A	0–0
Madrid Open^{1}	A	A	A	Q2	A	A	A	Q1	A	A	A	A	A	0–0
Canadian Open	A	A	A	A	A	A	A	Q1	A	A	A	A	A	0–0
Win–loss	0–0	0–0	0–0	0–0	0–0	0–0	0–0	0–0	0–0	0–0	0–0	0–0	0–0	0–0
Career statistics
Tournaments	0	0	1	2	5	1	1	4	1	0	3	0	0	18
Overall win–loss	1–0	0–0	1–1	3–3	2–5	1–1	1–1	1–4	1–1	0–0	0–3	0–1	0–0	11–20
Year-end ranking	834	567	207	136	182	141	183	149	227	485	237	207	852	35%

^{1} Held as Hamburg Masters (outdoor clay) until 2008, Madrid Masters (outdoor clay) 2009 – present.

=== Doubles ===
Current through 2018 Wimbledon Championships.

Tournament	2003	2004	2005	2006	2007	2008	2009	2010	2011	2012	2013	2014	2015	2016	2017	2018	W–L
Grand Slam tournaments
Australian Open	A	A	A	A	A	A	A	A	A	A	A	A	A	A	A	A	0–0
French Open	A	A	A	A	A	A	A	A	A	A	A	A	A	A	A	A	0–0
Wimbledon	A	A	A	A	1R	A	A	1R	A	A	A	A	A	A	2R	1R	1–4
US Open	A	A	A	A	A	A	A	A	A	A	A	A	A	A	A	A	0–0
Win–loss	0–0	0–0	0–0	0–0	0–1	0–0	0–0	0–1	0–0	0–0	0–0	0–0	0–0	0–0	1–1	0–1	1–4
National representation
Davis Cup	Z2	A	A	PO	PO	A	1R	Alt	SF	QF	F	1R	A	A	A	A	4–6
Win–loss	0–0	0–0	0–0	1–2	1–0	0–0	0–0	0–0	1–0	0–1	1–2	0–1	0–0	0–0	0–0	0–0	4–6
Career statistics
Tournaments	0	0	1	1	1	0	0	2	1	1	0	0	0	1	1	3	12
Overall win–loss	0–0	0–0	0–1	3–3	1–1	0–0	0–0	1–2	1–1	0–2	1–2	0–1	0–0	1–1	1–1	0–3	9–18
Year-end ranking	545	817	339	255	468	171	489	136	446	900	282	254	110	640	333		33%
