= Jean Andersen =

South African tennis player

- Full name: Jean Andersen
- Country (sports): South Africa
- Residence: Austin, Texas, United States
- Born: 17 June 1988 (age 37) Cape Town, South Africa
- Height: 1.9 m (6 ft 3 in)
- Turned pro: 2011
- Plays: Right-handed (two-handed backhand)
- College: University of Texas
- Prize money: US $29,063

Singles
- Career record: 0–2; 3–7; 19–30
- Career titles: 0
- Highest ranking: No. 624 (25 October 2010)

Other tournaments

Doubles
- Career record: 1–1
- Career titles: 0
- Highest ranking: 190

Team competitions
- Davis Cup: Group I, 2R (2013)

Jean Andersen (born 17 June 1988) is a South African professional tennis player. He has represented South Africa in Davis Cup matches.

== College career ==
Andersen played college tennis for the Texas Longhorns and was an All-American, ranking as high as number 2 in the National Collegiate Athletic Association in doubles. His father, Johann, was a graduate of the University of Texas. Anderson studied kinesiology while attending the university. In 2011, he qualified for the NCAA Division I Men's Tennis Championship tournament as a doubles player.

== Davis Cup ==
Andersen represented South Africa in a Davis Cup Group I tie in 2013, and in a Group II tie in 2014.

Europe/Africa Group I
Round	Date	Opponents	Final match score	Location	Surface	Match	Opponent	Rubber score
R2	5–7 April 2013	Poland	1–3	Zielona Góra	Hard (i)	Singles 1	Jerzy Janowicz	6–4, 6–3, 6–3 (def.)
R2	5–7 April 2013	Poland	1–3	Zielona Góra	Hard (i)	Doubles (with Rik de Voest)	Fyrstenberg/Matkowski	7–5, 7–6^{(7–2)}, 7–5 (def.)
Europe/Africa Group II
Round	Date	Opponents	Final match score	Location	Surface	Match	Opponent	Rubber score
R2	4–6 April 2014	Lithuania	2–3	Centurion	Hard	Singles 1	Ričardas Berankis	6–3, 7–6^{(7–2)}, 6–3 (def.)
R2	4–6 April 2014	Lithuania	2–3	Centurion	Hard	Doubles (with Raven Klaasen)	Berankis/Grigelis	3–6, 6–3, 6–3, 7–6^{(7–5)} (W)

== World TeamTennis ==
Andersen has appeared in matches for the Springfield Lasers of World TeamTennis in three different seasons: 2011, 2014 and 2016.

== Coaching ==
Anderson currently serves as the academy director for T Bar M Racquet Club's tennis academy in Dallas, Texas.

== Personal ==
Anderson married the former Tori Moore of Texas on 10 January 2015.

== See also ==
- South Africa Davis Cup team
