= 2014 Davis Cup Europe/Africa Zone Group II =

International tennis competition

The Europe and Africa Zone is one of the three zones of regional Davis Cup competition in 2014.

In the Europe and Africa Zone there are four different groups in which teams compete against each other to advance to the next group.

== Participating teams ==
Seeds:

1. South Africa
2. Denmark
3. Finland
4. Moldova
5. Bosnia and Herzegovina
6. Belarus
7. Luxembourg
8. Lithuania

Remaining nations:

- Bulgaria
- Cyprus
- Egypt
- Greece
- Ireland
- Monaco
- Morocco
- Norway

=== Draw ===
Play-offs
Oslo, Norway (hard, indoor)
Monaco	5
Norway	0
Athens, Greece (clay)
Bulgaria	4
Greece	1
Dublin, Ireland (hard, indoor)
Ireland	3
Egypt	2
Casablanca, Morocco (clay)
Morocco	4
Cyprus	1

First round
Centurion, South Africa (hard)
1	South Africa	3
Monaco	2
Oslo, Norway (hard, indoor)
8	Lithuania	5
Norway	0
Helsinki, Finland (hard, indoor)
3	Finland	3
Bulgaria	2
Sarajevo, Bosnia-Herz. (carpet, indoor)
5	Bosnia and Herzegovina	3
Greece	1
Minsk, Belarus (hard, indoor)
Ireland	1
6	Belarus	4
Chișinău, Moldova (hard, indoor)
Egypt	1
4	Moldova	4
Rabat, Morocco (clay)
Morocco	2
7	Luxembourg	3
Copenhagen, Denmark (hard, indoor)
Cyprus	1
2	Denmark	4

Second round
Centurion, South Africa (hard)
1	South Africa	2
8	Lithuania	3
Helsinki, Finland (hard, indoor)
3	Finland	2
5	Bosnia and Herzegovina	3
Chișinău, Moldova (hard, indoor)
6	Belarus	1
4	Moldova	4
Hillerød, Denmark (hard, indoor)
7	Luxembourg	0
2	Denmark	5

Third round
Sarajevo, Bosnia-Herz. (hard, indoor)
8	Lithuania	3
5	Bosnia and Herzegovina	2
Kolding, Denmark (carpet, indoor)
4	Moldova	2
2	Denmark	3

- Norway, Greece, Egypt, and Cyprus relegated to Group III in 2015.
- Lithuania and Denmark promoted to Group I in 2015.

== First round ==
=== South Africa vs. Monaco ===
South Africa
3
Irene Country Club, Centurion, South Africa
31 January – 2 February 2014
Hard

Monaco
2

			1	2	3	4	5
1	(South Africa) (Monaco)	Rik de Voest; Romain Arneodo	5; 7	6; 3	5; 7	7; 5	4; 6
2	(South Africa) (Monaco)	Nikala Scholtz; Benjamin Balleret	7; 5	7^{7} 6^{4}	3; 6	3; 6	6; 3
3	(South Africa) (Monaco)	Raven Klaasen / Ruan Roelofse; Guillaume Couillard / Thomas Oger	6; 4	6; 4	3; 6	4; 6	6; 3
4	(South Africa) (Monaco)	Rik de Voest; Benjamin Balleret	7^{7} 6^{2}	6; 2	6; 3
5	(South Africa) (Monaco)	Nikala Scholtz; Romain Arneodo	5; 7					retired

=== Norway vs. Lithuania ===
Norway
0
Oslo Tennis Arena, Oslo, Norway
31 January – 2 February 2014
Hard (indoor)

Lithuania
5

			1	2	3	4	5
1	(Norway) (Lithuania)	Joachim Bjerke; Laurynas Grigelis	7^{7} 6^{4}	3; 6	3; 6	2; 6
2	(Norway) (Lithuania)	Viktor Durasovic; Ričardas Berankis	5; 7	3; 6	2; 6
3	(Norway) (Lithuania)	Stian Boretti / Viktor Durasovic; Ričardas Berankis / Laurynas Grigelis	1; 6	4; 6	5; 7
4	(Norway) (Lithuania)	Joachim Bjerke; Lukas Mugevičius	1; 3					retired
5	(Norway) (Lithuania)	Viktor Durasovic; Mantas Bugailiskis	6^{4} 7^{7}	6; 4	3; 6

=== Finland vs. Bulgaria ===
Finland
3
Tali Tennis Center, Helsinki, Finland
31 January – 2 February 2014
Hard (indoor)

Bulgaria
2

			1	2	3	4	5
1	(Finland) (Bulgaria)	Jarkko Nieminen; Alexandar Lazov	6; 3	6; 0	6; 3
2	(Finland) (Bulgaria)	Micke Kontinen; Dimitar Kutrovsky	4; 6	2; 6	1; 6
3	(Finland) (Bulgaria)	Henri Kontinen / Jarkko Nieminen; Tihomir Grozdanov / Dimitar Kutrovsky	6; 3	6; 2	3; 6	6; 2
4	(Finland) (Bulgaria)	Jarkko Nieminen; Dimitar Kutrovsky	4; 6	6; 1	2; 6	6; 4	6; 3
5	(Finland) (Bulgaria)	Herkko Pöllänen; Tihomir Grozdanov	7^{7} 6^{3}	2; 6	3; 6

=== Bosnia and Herzegovina vs. Greece ===
Bosnia and Herzegovina
3
Mojmilo Sports Hall, Sarajevo, Bosnia and Herzegovina
31 January – 2 February 2014
Carpet (indoor)

Greece
1

			1	2	3	4	5
1	(Bosnia and Herzegovina) (Greece)	Mirza Bašić; Alexandros Jakupovic	6; 3	6; 2	6; 2
2	(Bosnia and Herzegovina) (Greece)	Damir Džumhur; Markos Kalovelonis	6^{4} 7^{7}	6^{1} 7^{7}	6; 3	2; 6
3	(Bosnia and Herzegovina) (Greece)	Mirza Bašić / Tomislav Brkić; Alexandros Jakupovic / Markos Kalovelonis	5; 7	6; 0	6; 4	7; 5
4	(Bosnia and Herzegovina) (Greece)	Damir Džumhur; Alexandros Jakupovic	4; 6	3; 6	6; 2	6; 3	6; 4
5	(Bosnia and Herzegovina) (Greece)	Mirza Bašić; Markos Kalovelonis						not played

=== Belarus vs. Ireland ===
Belarus
4
Republic Olympic Training Center for Tennis, Minsk, Belarus
31 January – 2 February 2014
Hard (indoor)

Ireland
1

			1	2	3	4	5
1	(Belarus) (Republic of Ireland)	Dzmitry Zhyrmont; Daniel Glancy	6; 2	6; 4	6; 2
2	(Belarus) (Republic of Ireland)	Egor Gerasimov; John Morrissey	6; 4	6; 1	6; 2
3	(Belarus) (Republic of Ireland)	Max Mirnyi / Aliaksandr Bury; James Cluskey / David O'Hare	6^{3} 7^{7}	7^{8} 6^{6}	5; 7	7^{10} 6^{8}	6; 2
4	(Belarus) (Republic of Ireland)	Egor Gerasimov; Daniel Glancy	6; 3	6; 3
5	(Belarus) (Republic of Ireland)	Dzmitry Zhyrmont; John Morrissey						w/o

=== Moldova vs. Egypt ===
Moldova
4
Manejul de Atletica Usoara, Chişinău, Moldova
31 January – 2 February 2014
Hard (indoor)

Egypt
1

			1	2	3	4	5
1	(Moldova) (Egypt)	Maxim Dubarenco; Mohamed Safwat	2; 6	2; 6	2; 6
2	(Moldova) (Egypt)	Radu Albot; Karim Hossam	6; 2	3; 6	6; 3	3; 0		retired
3	(Moldova) (Egypt)	Radu Albot / Maxim Dubarenco; Sherif Sabry / Mohamed Safwat	6; 3	6; 4	6; 0
4	(Moldova) (Egypt)	Radu Albot; Mohamed Safwat	2; 6	6; 3	6; 4	6; 4
5	(Moldova) (Egypt)	Maxim Dubarenco; Sherif Sabry	6^{6} 7^{8}	6; 4	6; 4

=== Morocco vs. Luxembourg ===
Morocco
2
Club Union Sportive des Cheminots du Maroc, Rabat, Morocco
31 January – 2 February 2014
Clay

Luxembourg
3

			1	2	3	4	5
1	(Morocco) (Luxembourg)	Yassine Idmbarek; Gilles Müller	1; 6	6^{0} 7^{7}	4; 6
2	(Morocco) (Luxembourg)	Hicham Khaddari; Ugo Nastasi	6; 3	1; 6	6; 4	6; 2
3	(Morocco) (Luxembourg)	Yassine Idmbarek / Younès Rachidi; Gilles Müller / Mike Scheidweiler	4; 6	4; 6	2; 6
4	(Morocco) (Luxembourg)	Hicham Khaddari; Gilles Müller	4; 6	2; 6	3; 6
5	(Morocco) (Luxembourg)	Younès Rachidi; Christophe Tholl	6; 2	7; 5

=== Denmark vs. Cyprus ===
Denmark
4
Hørsholm-Rungsted Tennisklub, Copenhagen, Denmark
31 January – 2 February 2014
Hard (indoor)

Cyprus
1

			1	2	3	4	5
1	(Denmark) (Cyprus)	Martin Pedersen; Sergis Kyratzis	6; 2	6; 3	6; 2
2	(Denmark) (Cyprus)	Frederik Nielsen; Petros Chrysochos	2; 6	6; 1	6; 0	7^{7} 6^{4}
3	(Denmark) (Cyprus)	Thomas Kromann / Frederik Nielsen; Christos Hadjigeorgiou / Photos Photiades	6; 2	6; 1	6; 1
4	(Denmark) (Cyprus)	Mikael Torpegaard; Sergis Kyratzis	6; 0	6; 4
5	(Denmark) (Cyprus)	Martin Pedersen; Petros Chrysochos	3; 6	4; 6

== Second round ==
=== South Africa vs. Lithuania ===
South Africa
2
Irene Country Club, Centurion, South Africa
4–6 April 2014
Hard

Lithuania
3

			1	2	3	4	5
1	(South Africa) (Lithuania)	Jean Andersen; Ričardas Berankis	3; 6	6^{2} 7^{7}	3; 6
2	(South Africa) (Lithuania)	Rik de Voest; Laurynas Grigelis	7^{7} 6^{5}	7^{7} 6^{3}	2; 6	7^{7} 6^{4}
3	(South Africa) (Lithuania)	Jean Andersen / Raven Klaasen; Ričardas Berankis / Laurynas Grigelis	3; 6	6; 3	6; 3	7^{7} 6^{5}
4	(South Africa) (Lithuania)	Rik de Voest; Ričardas Berankis	2; 6	4; 6	7; 5	5; 7
5	(South Africa) (Lithuania)	Ruan Roelofse; Laurynas Grigelis	6^{5} 7^{7}	6; 3	6^{3} 7^{7}	4; 6

=== Finland vs. Bosnia and Herzegovina ===
Finland
2
Tali Tennis Center, Helsinki, Finland
4–6 April 2014
Hard (indoor)

Bosnia and Herzegovina
3

			1	2	3	4	5
1	(Finland) (Bosnia and Herzegovina)	Juho Paukku; Damir Džumhur	3; 6	6^{4} 7^{7}	4; 6
2	(Finland) (Bosnia and Herzegovina)	Jarkko Nieminen; Mirza Bašić	6; 3	6^{3} 7^{7}	6; 3	3; 6	6; 8
3	(Finland) (Bosnia and Herzegovina)	Henri Kontinen / Jarkko Nieminen; Mirza Bašić / Tomislav Brkić	6; 3	7^{7} 6^{4}	6; 2
4	(Finland) (Bosnia and Herzegovina)	Jarkko Nieminen; Damir Džumhur	7; 5	7^{7} 6^{1}	6; 1
5	(Finland) (Bosnia and Herzegovina)	Juho Paukku; Mirza Bašić	6; 3	6; 4	3; 6	5; 7	4; 6

=== Moldova vs. Belarus ===
Moldova
4
Manejul de Atletica Usoara, Chişinău, Moldova
4–6 April 2014
Clay

Belarus
1

			1	2	3	4	5
1	(Moldova) (Belarus)	Radu Albot; Dzmitry Zhyrmont	6; 2	6; 2	2; 6	6; 2
2	(Moldova) (Belarus)	Maxim Dubarenco; Uladzimir Ignatik	7; 5	7^{7} 6^{5}	6; 3
3	(Moldova) (Belarus)	Andrei Ciumac / Andrei Gorban; Egor Gerasimov / Max Mirnyi	3; 6	2; 6	0; 6
4	(Moldova) (Belarus)	Radu Albot; Egor Gerasimov	3; 6	1; 6	6; 3	6; 1	6; 2
5	(Moldova) (Belarus)	Maxim Dubarenco; Dzmitry Zhyrmont	7^{7} 6^{3}	7^{7} 6^{2}

=== Denmark vs. Luxembourg ===
Denmark
5
Hillerød Tennis Klub, Hillerød, Denmark
4–6 April 2014
Hard (indoor)

Luxembourg
0

			1	2	3	4	5
1	(Denmark) (Luxembourg)	Martin Pedersen; Ugo Nastasi	6; 4	6; 4	6; 1
2	(Denmark) (Luxembourg)	Frederik Nielsen; Mike Scheidweiller	6; 3	6; 4	5; 7	6^{5} 7^{7}	6; 1
3	(Denmark) (Luxembourg)	Thomas Kromann / Frederik Nielsen; Gilles Kremer / Mike Scheidweiller	4; 6	6; 4	5; 7	6; 4	6; 2
4	(Denmark) (Luxembourg)	Frederik Nielsen; Ugo Nastasi	6; 4	3; 6	6; 2
5	(Denmark) (Luxembourg)	Mikael Torpegaard; Christophe Tholl	6; 2	6; 3

== Play-offs ==
=== Norway vs. Monaco ===
Norway
0
Oslo Tennis Arena, Oslo, Norway
4–6 April 2014
Hard (indoor)

Monaco
5

			1	2	3	4	5
1	(Norway) (Monaco)	Viktor Durasovic; Benjamin Balleret	1; 6	2; 6	4; 6
2	(Norway) (Monaco)	Joachim Bjerke; Romain Arneodo	6^{7} 7^{9}	3; 6	3; 6
3	(Norway) (Monaco)	Stian Boretti / Erling Tveit; Guillaume Couillard / Thomas Oger	2; 6	4; 6	3; 6
4	(Norway) (Monaco)	Joachim Bjerke; Benjamin Balleret	6^{4} 7^{7}	4; 6
5	(Norway) (Monaco)	Viktor Durasovic; Romain Arneodo	1; 6	2; 6

=== Greece vs. Bulgaria ===
Greece
1
Ilioupoli Tennis Club, Athens, Greece
4–6 April 2014
Clay

Bulgaria
4

			1	2	3	4	5
1	(Greece) (Bulgaria)	Markos Kalovelonis; Grigor Dimitrov	3; 6	3; 6	0; 6
2	(Greece) (Bulgaria)	Theodoros Angelinos; Dimitar Kutrovsky	4; 6	3; 6	6; 1	3; 6
3	(Greece) (Bulgaria)	Alexandros Jakupovic / Markos Kalovelonis; Grigor Dimitrov / Dimitar Kutrovsky	6^{4} 7^{7}	2; 6	4; 6
4	(Greece) (Bulgaria)	Alexandros Jakupovic; Dinko Halachev	7^{7} 6^{2}	6; 1
5	(Greece) (Bulgaria)	Charalampos Kapogiannis; Dimitar Kutrovsky	7; 5	0; 6	1; 6

=== Ireland vs. Egypt ===
Ireland
3
Castleknock Tennis Club, Dublin, Ireland
4–6 April 2014
Hard (indoor)

Egypt
2

			1	2	3	4	5
1	(Republic of Ireland) (Egypt)	James McGee; Karim-Mohamed Maamoun	6; 0	6; 3	6; 2
2	(Republic of Ireland) (Egypt)	Sam Barry; Mohamed Safwat	6; 3	5; 7	5; 7	6^{5} 7^{7}
3	(Republic of Ireland) (Egypt)	Sam Barry / James Cluskey; Sherif Sabry / Mohamed Safwat	6; 2	7^{7} 6^{5}	6; 2
4	(Republic of Ireland) (Egypt)	James McGee; Mohamed Safwat	7; 5	6; 4	6; 3
5	(Republic of Ireland) (Egypt)	Daniel Glancy; Mazen Osama	6^{4} 7^{7}	6^{5} 7^{7}

=== Morocco vs. Cyprus ===
Morocco
4
Complexe Sportif Al Amal, Casablanca, Morocco
4–6 April 2014
Clay

Cyprus
1

			1	2	3	4	5
1	(Morocco) (Cyprus)	Hicham Khaddari; Sergis Kyratzis	6; 2	2; 6	1; 6	5; 7
2	(Morocco) (Cyprus)	Lamine Ouahab; Petros Chrysochos	6; 3	6; 4	6; 4
3	(Morocco) (Cyprus)	Lamine Ouahab / Mehdi Ziadi; Petros Chrysochos / Rareș Cuzdriorean	7^{8} 6^{6}	6; 1	3; 6	4; 6	6; 4
4	(Morocco) (Cyprus)	Lamine Ouahab; Sergis Kyratzis	6; 0	6; 0	6; 0
5	(Morocco) (Cyprus)	Ayoub Chakrouni; Constantinos Ioannides	6; 3	6; 2

== Third round ==
=== Bosnia and Herzegovina vs. Lithuania ===
Bosnia and Herzegovina
2
Mojmilo Sports Hall, Sarajevo, Bosnia and Herzegovina
12–14 September 2014
Hard (indoor)

Lithuania
3

			1	2	3	4	5
1	(Bosnia and Herzegovina) (Lithuania)	Mirza Bašić; Ričardas Berankis	7; 5	6; 3	4; 6	4; 6	4; 6
2	(Bosnia and Herzegovina) (Lithuania)	Damir Džumhur; Laurynas Grigelis	6^{5} 7^{7}	6; 1	6; 1	1; 0		retired
3	(Bosnia and Herzegovina) (Lithuania)	Mirza Bašić / Tomislav Brkić; Ričardas Berankis / Laurynas Grigelis	3; 6	3; 6	6^{4} 7^{7}
4	(Bosnia and Herzegovina) (Lithuania)	Damir Džumhur; Ričardas Berankis	4; 6	4; 6	4; 6
5	(Bosnia and Herzegovina) (Lithuania)	Nerman Fatić; Lukas Mugevičius	6^{6} 7^{8}	6; 3	6; 4

=== Denmark vs. Moldova ===
Denmark
3
Bramdrupdam Hallerne, Kolding, Denmark
12–14 September 2014
Carpet (indoor)

Moldova
2

			1	2	3	4	5
1	(Denmark) (Moldova)	Martin Pedersen; Radu Albot	5; 7	3; 6	2; 6
2	(Denmark) (Moldova)	Frederik Nielsen; Maxim Dubarenco	6; 2	6; 2	6; 3
3	(Denmark) (Moldova)	Thomas Kromann / Frederik Nielsen; Radu Albot / Maxim Dubarenco	6; 2	6; 4	6; 4
4	(Denmark) (Moldova)	Frederik Nielsen; Radu Albot	5; 7	3; 6	3; 6
5	(Denmark) (Moldova)	Martin Pedersen; Maxim Dubarenco	3; 6	7^{7} 6^{1}	6; 4	3; 6	7; 5
