= 2014 Springfield Lasers season =

Western Conference champions
- Conference: 2nd Western

Record
- 2014 record: 7 wins, 7 losses
- Home record: 5 wins, 2 losses
- Road record: 2 wins, 5 losses
- Games won–lost: 270–239

Team info
- Owner(s): Springfield-Greene County Park Board represented by John Cooper
- President/CEO: Bob Belote
- General manager: Paul Nahon
- Coach: John-Laffnie de Jager
- Stadium: Mediacom Stadium at Cooper Tennis Complex (capacity: 2,500)

The 2014 Springfield Lasers season was the 19th season of the franchise in World TeamTennis (WTT).

The Lasers won their second consecutive Western Conference championship and met the Washington Kastles in the WTT Championship Match in a rematch of the 2013 Final. For the second straight year, the Lasers fell to the Kastles who won their fourth consecutive King Trophy.

== Season recap ==
=== Roddick traded ===
On November 21, 2013, the Lasers announced that they had traded Andy Roddick in exchange for financial consideration to the Austin Aces following the relocation of that franchise from Orange County. Roddick, a resident of Austin, Texas, had expressed a desire to play in his hometown and had invested in the league. Although the WTT press release mentioned that the Lasers and Aces would also swap positions in the Marquee Player Draft (improving the Lasers' draft position), this was not reflected when the league later reported the results of that draft.

=== Move to Eastern Conference ===
On February 1, 2014, WTT announced that the Lasers would move to the Eastern Conference, and the New York Sportimes who had relocated and become the San Diego Aviators would move to the Western Conference. Just days later, the Las Vegas Neon was contracted by the league after which WTT decided to keep the Lasers in the Western Conference.

=== Drafts ===
With the Lasers winning the Western Conference championship in 2013, they had the next to last pick in each round of both WTT drafts. Prior to the marquee player draft, the Lasers acquired the rights to James Blake from the Boston Lobsters for undisclosed consideration. The Lasers then selected Blake as a protected player in the first round and passed on making a second-round pick. In the roster player draft, the Lasers protected Alisa Kleybanova in the first round and then traded their third-round pick and financial consideration to the Washington Kastles for the Kastles' first-round pick which they used to select Anna-Lena Grönefeld whom had been left unprotected by the San Diego Aviators. In the second round, the Lasers protected Jean-Julien Rojer. The Lasers traded up again in the third round. They sent their fourth round pick and financial consideration to the Aviators for San Diego's third round pick which they used to select 2009 WTT Male Rookie of the Year Michael Russell who was not subject to protection by any team.

=== Other player transactions ===
On June 27, 2014, 2013 WTT Female Rookie of the Year Alisa Kleybanova announced she would be unable to play for the Lasers in 2014, due to a shoulder injury. The following day, the Lasers announced that they had signed Olga Govortsova to replace Kleybanova.

On July 5, 2014, the Lasers announced that 2013 WTT Male Most Valuable Player Jean-Julien Rojer would miss the 2014 season with a back injury. With the season starting the following day, the Lasers signed Ross Hutchins to replace Rojer.

On July 8, 2014, the Lasers signed Līga Dekmeijere as a substitute player when it was announced that Anna-Lena Grönefeld would miss the remainder of the season with a hip injury.

On July 10, 2014, the Lasers re-signed Jean Andersen as a substitute player. He had previously played for the Lasers in 2011.

On July 15, 2014, the Lasers signed Raquel Kops-Jones as a substitute player.

On July 19, 2014, the Lasers signed Abigail Spears as a substitute player.

On July 22, 2014, the Lasers signed Fritz Wolmarans as a substitute player.

=== Early season trouble ===
The Lasers opened their 2014 season with two home matches and lost them both in super tiebreakers. In the opener on July 6, against the Philadelphia Freedoms, the Lasers had leads of 10–6 and 16–14 before falling 21–20. The following night against the Texas Wild, Michael Russell erased a 15–11 deficit heading to the final set with a 5–1 men's singles set win but fell to Alex Bogomolov, Jr. in the super tiebreaker. After two difficult home losses, the Lasers hit the road to play the Austin Aces on July 8, in the franchise's inaugural home match in Texas after relocating from Orange County. In a match nationally televised by the Tennis Channel, the teams played to 14-all tie through the first four sets, before Vera Zvonareva took the final set of women's singles from Olga Govortsova to give the Aces the victory and drop the Lasers to 0 wins and 3 losses just three days into the season.

=== Winning streak ===
The Lasers recorded their first victory of the season on the road against the Boston Lobsters on July 10. They were led by Olga Govortsova who registered a 5–0 set win in women's singles and teamed with Līga Dekmeijere for a 5–1 set win in women's doubles. Michael Russell had a 5–1 set win in men's singles over former Laser Rik de Voest. Two nights later, the Lasers returned home for a rematch with the Texas Wild. The Wild raced to a 10–5 lead after two sets, but Govortsova teamed with James Blake for a 5–2 set win in mixed doubles and with Dekmeijere for a 5–1 set win in women's doubles to give the Lasers a 15–13 lead heading to the final set of men's singles. Alex Bogomolov, Jr. prevailed over Russell, 5–3, to send the match to a super tiebreaker. With the tiebreaker game tied at 6, Russell won the match-deciding point to give the Lasers a 19–18 victory. The Austin Aces came to Springfield the following night, and it was Govortsova who led the Lasers to victory once again. She won the women's singles set, 5–1, and partnered with Dekmeijere for a 5–2 set win in women's doubles and with Blake for a 5–0 set win in mixed doubles. The win evened the Lasers' record at 3 wins and 3 losses.

=== Another winning streak ===
After two road losses dropped the Lasers' record to 3 wins and 5 losses, they returned home to meet the San Diego Aviators on July 17. Ross Hutchins and Michael Russell got the Lasers started with a 5–2 set win in men's doubles. After dropping the next two sets, the Lasers found themselves behind, 12–8. Olga Govortsova won the women's singles set, 5–3, and Russell won the men's singles set by the same score to send the match to a super tiebreaker which Russell took, 7–2, to give the Lasers a 19–18 victory. The following night, the three-time defending champion Washington Kastles came to town. The Lasers dominated them, winning four of the five sets. Hutchins teamed with Russell for a 5–2 set win in men's doubles and with Govortsova for a 5–1 set win in mixed doubles. Govortsova and Raquel Kops-Jones won the women's doubles set, 5–1. Russell took the men's singles set, 5–1. The resulting 24–10 defeat for the Kastles was the worst loss in their franchise history. On July 19, the Lasers took all five sets in a 25–16 road win over the Texas Wild. Govortsova earned a set win in women's singles, 5–4, and teamed with Hutchins for a 5–4 set win in mixed doubles and with Abigail Spears (making her Lasers debut) for a 5–2 women's doubles set win. Russell won the men's singles set, 5–2, and partnered with Hutchins in men's doubles for a 5–4 set win. With heir third straight victory, the Lasers improved their record to 6 wins and 5 losses.

=== Lasers clinch a playoff berth ===
After consecutive road losses in San Diego and Washington, the Lasers entered the final day of the regular season with 6 wins and 7 losses, but nevertheless in control of their own destiny; a win would put them into the playoffs. The Lasers responded by taking all five sets in a dominant 25–7 home victory over the Boston Lobsters. Olga Govortsova won the women's singles set, 5–0, and teamed with Abigail Spears for another 5–0 set win in women's doubles. Spears and Ross Hutchins took the mixed doubles set, 5–2. Hutchins and Michael Russell opened the match with a 5–2 set win in men's doubles. Russell sealed the victory with a 5–4 men's singles set win and gave the Lasers their second consecutive playoff berth.

=== Second consecutive Western Conference title ===
The Lasers went on the road to face the San Diego Aviators, the league's best team in the regular season, in the Western Conference Championship Match. Michael Russell got the Lasers started with a 5–4 set win in men's singles. The Aviators took the women's doubles set to tie the score at 9 and then the mixed doubles set to take a 14–12 lead. Olga Govortsova's dominant 5–0 set win in women's doubles put the Lasers in front, 17–14, heading to the final set of men's doubles. Russell and Ross Hutchins held off the formidable Bryan brothers for a 5–3 set win that gave the Lasers a 22–17 victory and their second consecutive Western Conference Championship.

=== WTT Final ===
On July 27, the Lasers met the Washington Kastles in the WTT Final for the second consecutive year. Although the match was in Springfield, because WTT predetermined that the Western Conference champion would host the Final, the Kastles, as the higher seed, were treated as the "home" team in determining order of play. The Kastles won all five sets en route to their fourth consecutive title, They were led by Martina Hingis who was named WTT Finals Most Valuable Player after earning a 5–2 win over Olga Govortsova in the second set of women's singles, teaming with Anastasia Rodionova for a 5–1 win over Govortsova and Līga Dekmeijere in the fourth set of women's doubles and closing out the match with Leander Paes with a 5–4 mixed doubles set win over Govortsova and Ross Hutchins.

== Event chronology ==
- November 21, 2013: The Lasers traded Andy Roddick to the Austin Aces for financial consideration.
- February 11, 2014: The Lasers traded for James Blake and selected him in the WTT Marquee Player Draft.
- March 11, 2014: The Lasers protected Alisa Kleybanova and Jean-Julien Rojer in the WTT Roster Player Draft. The Lasers traded their third round pick (20th overall) and financial consideration for the Washington Kastles' first-round pick (seventh overall) which they used to draft Anna-Lena Grönefeld. The Lasers traded their fourth round pick (27th overall) and financial consideration for the San Diego Aviators' third round pick (15th overall) which they used to draft Michael Russell.
- June 28, 2014: The Lasers signed Olga Govortsova to replace the injured Alisa Kleybanova.
- July 5, 2014: The Lasers signed Ross Hutchins to replace the injured Jean-Julien Rojer.
- July 8, 2014: The Lasers signed Līga Dekmeijere as a substitute player.
- July 10, 2014: The Lasers signed Jean Andersen as a substitute player.
- July 15, 2014: The Lasers signed Raquel Kops-Jones as a substitute player.
- July 19, 2014: The Lasers signed Abigail Spears as a substitute player.
- July 22, 2014: The Lasers signed Fritz Wolmarans as a substitute player.
- July 23, 2014: The Lasers clinched their second consecutive playoff berth with a 25–7 victory over the Boston Lobsters.
- July 24, 2014: The Lasers won their second consecutive Western Conference Championship with a 22–17 victory over the San Diego Aviators.
- July 27, 2014: The Lasers lost the WTT Final to the Washington Kastles, 25–13.

== Draft picks ==
Since the Lasers won the Western Conference championship in 2013, they had the next to last selection in each round of both WTT drafts.

=== Marquee player draft ===
The Lasers protected James Blake after acquiring him in a trade with the Boston Lobsters. The selections made by the Lasers are shown in the table below.

Round	No.	Overall	Player chosen	Prot?
1	7	7	James Blake	Y
2	7	15	Pass	–

=== Roster player draft ===
The Lasers traded up twice in the roster player draft to select Anna-Lena Grönefeld in the first round and Michael Russell in the third round. First, the Lasers traded their third round pick (20th overall) and financial consideration for the Washington Kastles' first-round pick (seventh overall). Next, the Lasers traded their fourth round pick (27th overall) and financial consideration for the San Diego Aviators' third round pick (15th overall). The selections made by the Lasers are shown in the table below.

Round	No.	Overall	Player chosen	Prot?
1	6	6	Alisa Kleybanova	Y
1	7	7	Anna-Lena Grönefeld	N
2	6	13	Jean-Julien Rojer	Y
3	1	15	Michael Russell	N

== Match log ==
=== Regular season ===
Legend
Lasers Win	Lasers Loss
Home team in CAPS

Match	Date	Venue and location	Result and details	Record
1	July 6	Mediacom Stadium at Cooper Tennis Complex; Springfield, Missouri	Philadelphia Freedoms 21, SPRINGFIELD LASERS 20 (super tiebreaker, 7–3) * MD: Ross Hutchins/Michael Russell (Lasers) 5, Frank Dancevic/Marcelo Melo (Freedoms) 3 * WD: Olga Govortsova/Anna-Lena Grönefeld (Lasers) 5, Liezel Huber/Taylor Townsend (Freedoms) 3 * XD: Liezel Huber/Marcelo Melo (Freedoms) 5, Anna-Lena Grönefeld/Ross Hutchins (Lasers) 1 *** Anna-Lena Grönefeld substituted for Olga Govortsova at 0–2 * MS: Michael Russell (Lasers) 5, Frank Dancevic (Freedoms) 3 * WS: Taylor Townsend (Freedoms) 5, Olga Govortsova (Lasers) 4 * OT - WS: Taylor Townsend (Freedoms) 1, Olga Govortsova (Lasers) 0 * STB - WS: Taylor Townsend (Freedoms) 7, Olga Govortsova (Lasers) 3	0–1
2	July 7	Mediacom Stadium at Cooper Tennis Complex; Springfield, Missouri	Texas Wild 17, SPRINGFIELD LASERS 16 (super tiebreaker, 7–5) * MD: Alex Bogomolov, Jr./Aisam Qureshi (Wild) 5, Ross Hutchins/Michael Russell (Lasers) 2 * WD: Darija Jurak/Anabel Medina Garrigues (Wild) 5, Olga Govortsova/Anna-Lena Grönefeld (Lasers) 2 * XD: Olga Govortsova/Ross Hutchins (Lasers) 5, Anabel Medina Garrigues/Aisam Qureshi (Wild) 0 * WS: Anabel Medina Garrigues (Wild) 5, Olga Govortsova (Lasers) 2 * MS: Michael Russell (Lasers) 5, Alex Bogomolov, Jr. (Wild) 1 * STB - MS: Alex Bogomolov, Jr. (Wild) 7, Michael Russell (Lasers) 5	0–2
3	July 8	Cedar Park Center; Cedar Park, Texas	AUSTIN ACES 19, Springfield Lasers 17 * MS: Andy Roddick (Aces) 5, Michael Russell (Lasers) 2 * MD: Ross Hutchins/Michael Russell (Lasers) 5, Treat Huey/Andy Roddick (Aces) 2 * XD: Marion Bartoli/Treat Huey (Aces) 5, Olga Govortsova/Ross Hutchins (Lasers) 2 *** Marion Bartoli substituted for Vera Zvonareva at 0–0 * WD: Līga Dekmeijere/Olga Govortsova (Lasers) 5, Marion Bartoli/Vera Zvonareva (Aces) 2 * WS: Vera Zvonareva (Aces) 5, Olga Govortsova (Lasers) 3	0–3
4	July 10	Boston Lobsters Tennis Center at the Manchester Athletic Club; Manchester-by-the-Sea, Massachusetts	Springfield Lasers 23, BOSTON LOBSTERS 13 (overtime) * WD: Līga Dekmeijere/Olga Govortsova (Lasers) 5, Megan Moulton-Levy/Caitlin Whoriskey (Lobsters) 1 * MS: Michael Russell (Lasers) 5, Rik de Voest (Lobsters) 1 * WS: Olga Govortsova (Lasers) 5, Caitlin Whoriskey (Lobsters) 0 * XD: Caitlin Whoriskey/Eric Butorac (Lobsters) 5, Olga Govortsova/Jean Andersen (Lasers) 4 *** Caitlin Whoriskey substituted for Megan Moulton-Levy at 4–3 * MD: Eric Butorac/Rik de Voest (Lobsters) 5, Jean Andersen/Michael Russell (Lasers) 3 * OT - MD: Jean Andersen/Michael Russell (Lasers) 1, Eric Butorac/Rik de Voest (Lobsters) 1	1–3
5	July 12	Mediacom Stadium at Cooper Tennis Complex; Springfield, Missouri	SPRINGFIELD LASERS 19, Texas Wild 18 (super tiebreaker, 7–6) * MD: Alex Bogomolov, Jr./Aisam Qureshi (Wild) 5, James Blake/Michael Russell (Lasers) 2 * WS: Anabel Medina Garrigues (Wild) 5, Olga Govortsova (Lasers) 3 * XD: Olga Govortsova/James Blake (Lasers) 5, Darija Jurak/Aisam Qureshi (Wild) 2 * WD: Līga Dekmeijere/Olga Govortsova (Lasers) 5, Darija Jurak/Anabel Medina Garrigues (Wild) 1 * MS: Alex Bogomolov, Jr. (Wild) 5, Michael Russell (Lasers) 3 * STB - MS: Michael Russell (Lasers) 7, Alex Bogomolov, Jr. (Wild) 6	2–3
6	July 13	Mediacom Stadium at Cooper Tennis Complex; Springfield, Missouri	SPRINGFIELD LASERS 21, Austin Aces 13 * MD: Treat Huey/Andy Roddick (Aces) 5, James Blake/Michael Russell (Lasers) 3 * WS: Olga Govortsova (Lasers) 5, Vera Zvonareva (Aces) 1 * MS: Andy Roddick (Aces) 5, James Blake (Lasers) 3 * WD: Līga Dekmeijere/Olga Govortsova (Lasers) 5, Eva Hrdinová/Vera Zvonareva (Aces) 2 * XD: Olga Govortsova/James Blake (Lasers) 5, Vera Zvonareva/Andy Roddick (Aces) 0	3–3
7	July 15	Four Seasons Resort and Club Dallas at Las Colinas; Irving, Texas	TEXAS WILD 22, Springfield Lasers 13 * XD: Darija Jurak/Aisam Qureshi (Wild) 5, Olga Govortsova/Ross Hutchins (Lasers) 2 * WD: Darija Jurak/Anabel Medina Garrigues (Wild) 5, Olga Govortsova/Raquel Kops-Jones (Lasers) 3 * MS: Michael Russell (Lasers) 5, Alex Bogomolov, Jr. (Wild) 2 * WS: Anabel Medina Garrigues (Wild) 5, Olga Govortsova (Lasers) 1 * MD: Alex Bogomolov, Jr./Aisam Qureshi (Wild) 5, Ross Hutchins/Michael Russell (Lasers) 2	3–4
8	July 16	The Pavilion; Radnor Township, Pennsylvania	PHILADELPHIA FREEDOMS 21, Springfield Lasers 18 * MS: Michael Russell (Lasers) 5, Frank Dancevic (Freedoms) 4 * WD: Liezel Huber/Taylor Townsend (Freedoms) 5, Olga Govortsova/Raquel Kops-Jones (Lasers) 3 * MD: Frank Dancevic/Marcelo Melo (Freedoms) 5, Ross Hutchins/Michael Russell (Lasers) 2 * WS: Olga Govortsova (Lasers) 5, Taylor Townsend (Freedoms) 2 * XD: Liezel Huber/Marcelo Melo (Freedoms) 5, Raquel Kops-Jones/Ross Hutchins (Lasers) 3	3–5
9	July 17	Mediacom Stadium at Cooper Tennis Complex; Springfield, Missouri	SPRINGFIELD LASERS 19, San Diego Aviators 18 (super tiebreaker, 7–2)* MD: Ross Hutchins/Michael Russell (Lasers) 5, Raven Klaasen/Somdev Devvarman (Aviators) 2 * WD: Daniela Hantuchová/Květa Peschke (Aviators) 5, Olga Govortsova/Raquel Kops-Jones (Lasers) 0 * XD: Raven Klaasen/Květa Peschke (Aviators) 5, Ross Hutchins/Olga Govortsova (Lasers) 3; ***Olga Govortsova substituted for Raquel Kops-Jones at 1–2 * WS: Olga Govortsova (Lasers) 5, Daniela Hantuchová (Aviators) 3 * MS: Michael Russell (Lasers) 5, Somdev Devvarman (Aviators) 3 * STB – MS: Michael Russell (Lasers) 7, Somdev Devvarman (Aviators) 2	4–5
10	July 18	Mediacom Stadium at Cooper Tennis Complex; Springfield, Missouri	SPRINGFIELD LASERS 24, Washington Kastles 10 * MD: Ross Hutchins/Michael Russell (Lasers) 5, Leander Paes/Bobby Reynolds (Kastles) 2 * WD: Raquel Kops-Jones/Olga Govortsova (Lasers) 5, Anastasia Rodionova/Shelby Rogers (Kastles) 1 * XD: Olga Govortsova/Ross Hutchins (Lasers) 5, Anastasia Rodionova/Leander Paes (Kastles) 1 * WS: Anastasia Rodionova (Kastles) 5, Olga Govortsova (Lasers) 4; *MS: 'Michael Russell (Lasers) 5, Bobby Reynolds (Kastles) 1	5–5
11	July 19	Four Seasons Resort and Club Dallas at Las Colinas; Irving, Texas	Springfield Lasers 25, TEXAS WILD 16 * XD: Olga Govortsova/Ross Hutchins (Lasers) 5, Anabel Medina Garrigues/Aisam Qureshi (Wild) 4 * WD: Olga Govortsova/Abigail Spears (Lasers) 5, Darija Jurak/Anabel Medina Garrigues (Wild) 2 * MS: Michael Russell (Lasers) 5, Alex Bogomolov, Jr. (Wild) 2 * WS: Olga Govortsova (Lasers) 5, Anabel Medina Garrigues (Wild) 4 * MD: Ross Hutchins/Michael Russell (Lasers) 5, Alex Bogomolov, Jr./Aisam Qureshi (Wild) 4	6–5
12	July 20	Valley View Casino Center; San Diego, California	SAN DIEGO AVIATORS 21, Springfield Lasers 15 * MS: Michael Russell (Lasers) 5, Somdev Devvarman (Aviators) 1 * WD: Květa Peschke/Daniela Hantuchová (Aviators) 5, Olga Govortsova/Abigail Spears (Lasers) 3 * XD: Mike Bryan/Květa Peschke (Aviators) 5, Ross Hutchins/Abigail Spears (Lasers) 4 * WS: Daniela Hantuchová (Aviators) 5, Olga Govortsova (Lasers) 3 * MD: Bob Bryan/Mike Bryan (Aviators) 5, Ross Hutchins/Michael Russell (Lasers) 0	6–6
13	July 22	Kastles Stadium at the Charles E. Smith Center; Washington, District of Columbia	WASHINGTON KASTLES 23, Springfield Lasers 15 * MS: Michael Russell (Lasers) 5, Bobby Reynolds (Kastles) 3 * WS: Sloane Stephens (Kastles) 5, Olga Govortsova (Lasers) 2 * MD: Leander Paes/Bobby Reynolds (Kastles) 5, Michael Russell/Fritz Wolmarans (Lasers) 4 * WD: Martina Hingis/Anastasia Rodionova (Kastles) 5, Olga Govortsova/Abigail Spears (Lasers) 2 * XD: Martina Hingis/Leander Paes (Kastles) 5, Abigail Spears/Fritz Wolmarans (Lasers) 2	6–7
14	July 23	Mediacom Stadium at Cooper Tennis Complex; Springfield, Missouri	SPRINGFIELD LASERS 25, Boston Lobsters 7 * MD: Ross Hutchins/Michael Russell (Lasers) 5, James Cerretani/Rik de Voest (Lobsters) 1 * WD: Olga Govortsova/Abigail Spears (Lasers) 5, Julia Cohen/Megan Moulton-Levy (Lobsters) 0 * XD: Abigail Spears/Ross Hutchins (Lasers) 5, Megan Moulton-Levy/James Cerretani (Lobsters) 2 * WS: Olga Govortsova (Lasers) 5, Megan Moulton-Levy (Lobsters) 0 *** Megan Moulton-Levy substituted for Julia Cohen at 0–2 * MS: Michael Russell (Lasers) 5, Rik de Voest (Lobsters) 4	7–7

=== Playoffs ===
Legend
Lasers Win	Lasers Loss
Home team in CAPS

Western Conference Championship Match

Date	Venue and location	Result and details
July 24	Valley View Casino Center; San Diego, California	Springfield Lasers 22, SAN DIEGO AVIATORS 17 * MS: Michael Russell (Lasers) 5, Somdev Devvarman (Aviators) 4 * WD: Květa Peschke/Daniela Hantuchová (Aviators) 5, Olga Govortsova/Līga Dekmeijere (Lasers) 4 * XD: Bob Bryan/Květa Peschke (Aviators) 5, Ross Hutchins/Olga Govortsova (Lasers) 3 * WS: Olga Govortsova (Lasers) 5, Daniela Hantuchová (Aviators) 0 * MD: Michael Russell/Ross Hutchins (Lasers) 5, Bob Bryan/Mike Bryan (Aviators) 3

World TeamTennis Championship Match

Date	Venue and location	Result and details
July 27	Mediacom Stadium at Cooper Tennis Complex; Springfield, Missouri	WASHINGTON KASTLES (Note: Prior to the start of the season, WTT determined that the World TeamTennis Championship Match would be played on the home court of the Western Conference champion. The Kastles, as the higher seed, were treated as the "home" team under WTT rules for determining order of play.) 25, Springfield Lasers 13 * MS: Bobby Reynolds (Kastles) 5, Michael Russell (Lasers) 4 * WS: Martina Hingis (Kastles) 5, Olga Govortsova (Lasers) 2 * MD: Leander Paes/Bobby Reynolds (Kastles) 5, Michael Russell/Ross Hutchins (Lasers) 2 * WD: Martina Hingis/Anastasia Rodionova (Kastles) 5, Olga Govortsova/Līga Dekmeijere (Lasers) 1 * XD: Martina Hingis/Leander Paes (Kastles) 5, Olga Govortsova/Ross Hutchins (Lasers) 4

== Team personnel ==
=== On-court personnel ===
- (South Africa) John-Laffnie de Jager – Head Coach
- (South Africa) Jean Andersen (Note: Player appeared in fewer than three matches during the season as a substitute player and was not eligible to be protected in the following year's draft.)
- (United States) James Blake
- (Latvia) Līga Dekmeijere
- (Belarus) Olga Govortsova
- (Germany) Anna-Lena Grönefeld (Note: Roster player who appeared in fewer than three matches due to injury and was eligible to be protected in the draft the following year because of WTT's injury exception.)
- (United Kingdom) Ross Hutchins
- (Russia) Alisa Kleybanova (injured, did not play)
- (United States) Raquel Kops-Jones
- (Netherlands) Jean-Julien Rojer (injured, did not play)
- (United States) Michael Russell
- (United States) Abigail Spears
- (South Africa) Fritz Wolmarans

=== Front office ===
- Springfield-Greene County Park Board (represented by John Cooper) – Owner
- Bob Belote – Director
- Paul Nahon – General Manager

== Statistics ==
Players are listed in order of their game-winning percentage provided they played in at least 40% of the Lasers' games in that event, which is the WTT minimum for qualification for league leaders in individual statistical categories.

Men's singles – regular season

Player	GP	GW	GL	PCT	A	DF	BPW	BPP	BP%	3APW	3APP	3AP%
Michael Russell	98	62	36	.633	3	8	25	46	.543	17	30	.567
James Blake	8	3	5	.375	1	2	0	0	–	1	1	1.000
Total	106	65	41	.613	4	10	25	46	.543	18	31	.581

Women's singles – regular season

Player	GP	GW	GL	PCT	A	DF	BPW	BPP	BP%	3APW	3APP	3AP%
Olga Govortsova	104	52	52	.500	11	16	21	39	.538	11	26	.423
Total	104	52	52	.500	11	16	21	39	.538	11	26	.423

Men's doubles – regular season

Player	GP	GW	GL	PCT	A	DF	BPW	BPP	BP%	3APW	3APP	3AP%
Ross Hutchins	70	36	34	.514	3	5	10	31	.323	10	21	.476
Michael Russell	104	49	55	.471	2	10	11	34	.324	14	28	.500
Fritz Wolmarans	9	4	5	.444	1	0	0	0	–	0	0	–
Jean Andersen	10	4	6	.400	0	1	1	3	.333	3	5	.600
James Blake	15	5	10	.333	0	2	0	0	–	1	2	.500
Total	104	49	55	.471	6	18	11	34	.324	14	28	.500

Women's doubles – regular season

Player	GP	GW	GL	PCT	A	DF	BPW	BPP	BP%	3APW	3APP	3AP%
Olga Govortsova	95	53	42	.558	3	3	19	30	.633	21	32	.656
Līga Dekmeijere	26	20	6	.769	1	2	9	12	.750	8	10	.800
Abigail Spears	27	15	12	.556	0	1	4	7	.571	6	9	.667
Anna-Lena Grönefeld	15	7	8	.467	1	3	1	5	.200	2	6	.333
Raquel Kops-Jones	27	11	16	.407	0	4	5	6	.833	5	7	.714
Total	95	53	42	.558	5	13	19	30	.633	21	32	.656

Mixed doubles – regular season

Player	GP	GW	GL	PCT	A	DF	BPW	BPP	BP%	3APW	3APP	3AP%
Olga Govortsova	62	35	27	.565	3	2	12	36	.333	10	20	.500
Ross Hutchins	72	35	37	.486	2	7	10	30	.333	8	19	.421
James Blake	12	10	2	.833	0	2	3	6	.500	3	3	1.000
Abigail Spears	23	11	12	.478	0	0	2	5	.400	1	3	.333
Jean Andersen	9	4	5	.444	0	3	2	9	.222	2	5	.400
Raquel Kops-Jones	11	4	7	.364	0	2	1	2	.500	2	2	1.000
Fritz Wolmarans	7	2	5	.286	0	0	0	0	–	0	0	–
Anna-Lena Grönefeld	4	1	3	.250	0	0	0	2	.000	0	2	.000
Total	100	51	49	.510	5	16	15	45	.333	13	27	.481

Team totals – regular season

Player	GP	GW	GL	PCT	A	DF	BPW	BPP	BP%	3APW	3APP	3AP%
Men's singles	106	65	41	.613	4	10	25	46	.543	18	31	.581
Women's singles	104	52	52	.500	11	16	21	39	.538	11	26	.423
Men's doubles	104	49	55	.471	6	18	11	34	.324	14	28	.500
Women's doubles	95	53	42	.558	5	13	19	30	.633	21	32	.656
Mixed doubles	100	51	49	.510	5	16	15	45	.333	13	27	.481
Total	509	270	239	.530	31	73	91	194	.469	77	144	.535

Men's singles – playoffs

Player	GP	GW	GL	PCT	A	DF	BPW	BPP	BP%	3APW	3APP	3AP%
Michael Russell	18	9	9	.500	2	2	1	2	.500	2	4	.500
Total	18	9	9	.500	2	2	1	2	.500	2	4	.500

Women's singles – playoffs

Player	GP	GW	GL	PCT	A	DF	BPW	BPP	BP%	3APW	3APP	3AP%
Olga Govortsova	12	7	5	.583	0	2	3	6	.500	4	8	.500
Total	12	7	5	.583	0	2	3	6	.500	4	8	.500

Men's doubles – playoffs

Player	GP	GW	GL	PCT	A	DF	BPW	BPP	BP%	3APW	3APP	3AP%
Ross Hutchins	15	7	8	.467	1	1	1	2	.500	1	2	.500
Michael Russell	15	7	8	.467	0	2	1	2	.500	1	2	.500
Total	15	7	8	.467	1	3	1	2	.500	1	2	.500

Women's doubles – playoffs

Player	GP	GW	GL	PCT	A	DF	BPW	BPP	BP%	3APW	3APP	3AP%
Līga Dekmeijere	15	5	10	.333	0	1	3	6	.500	0	0	–
Olga Govortsova	15	5	10	.333	0	0	3	6	.500	0	0	–
Total	15	5	10	.333	0	1	3	6	.500	0	0	–

Mixed doubles – playoffs

Player	GP	GW	GL	PCT	A	DF	BPW	BPP	BP%	3APW	3APP	3AP%
Olga Govortsova	17	7	10	.412	1	0	3	5	.600	1	2	.500
Ross Hutchins	17	7	10	.412	1	1	3	5	.600	1	2	.500
Total	17	7	10	.412	2	1	3	5	.600	1	2	.500

Team totals – playoffs

Player	GP	GW	GL	PCT	A	DF	BPW	BPP	BP%	3APW	3APP	3AP%
Men's singles	18	9	9	.500	2	2	1	2	.500	2	4	.500
Women's singles	12	7	5	.583	0	2	3	6	.500	4	8	.500
Men's doubles	15	7	8	.467	1	3	1	2	.500	1	2	.500
Women's doubles	15	5	10	.333	0	1	3	6	.500	0	0	–
Mixed doubles	17	7	10	.412	2	1	3	5	.600	1	2	.500
Total	77	35	42	.455	5	9	11	21	.524	8	16	.500

Men's singles – all matches

Player	GP	GW	GL	PCT	A	DF	BPW	BPP	BP%	3APW	3APP	3AP%
Michael Russell	116	71	45	.612	5	10	26	48	.542	19	34	.559
James Blake	8	3	5	.375	1	2	0	0	–	1	1	1.000
Total	124	74	50	.597	6	12	26	48	.542	20	35	.571

Women's singles – all matches

Player	GP	GW	GL	PCT	A	DF	BPW	BPP	BP%	3APW	3APP	3AP%
Olga Govortsova	116	59	57	.509	11	18	24	45	.533	15	34	.441
Total	116	59	57	.509	11	18	24	45	.533	15	34	.441

Men's doubles – all matches

Player	GP	GW	GL	PCT	A	DF	BPW	BPP	BP%	3APW	3APP	3AP%
Ross Hutchins	85	43	42	.506	4	6	11	33	.333	11	23	.478
Michael Russell	119	56	63	.471	2	12	12	36	.333	15	30	.500
Fritz Wolmarans	9	4	5	.444	1	0	0	0	–	0	0	–
Jean Andersen	10	4	6	.400	0	1	1	3	.333	3	5	.600
James Blake	15	5	10	.333	0	2	0	0	–	1	2	.500
Total	119	56	63	.471	7	21	12	36	.333	15	30	.500

Women's doubles – all matches

Player	GP	GW	GL	PCT	A	DF	BPW	BPP	BP%	3APW	3APP	3AP%
Olga Govortsova	110	58	52	.527	3	3	22	36	.611	21	32	.656
Līga Dekmeijere	41	25	16	.610	1	3	12	18	.667	8	10	.800
Abigail Spears	27	15	12	.556	0	1	4	7	.571	6	9	.667
Anna-Lena Grönefeld	15	7	8	.467	1	3	1	5	.200	2	6	.333
Raquel Kops-Jones	27	11	16	.407	0	4	5	6	.833	5	7	.714
Total	110	58	52	.527	5	14	22	36	.611	21	32	.656

Mixed doubles – all matches

Player	GP	GW	GL	PCT	A	DF	BPW	BPP	BP%	3APW	3APP	3AP%
Olga Govortsova	79	42	37	.532	4	2	15	41	.366	11	22	.500
Ross Hutchins	89	42	47	.472	3	8	13	35	.371	9	21	.429
James Blake	12	10	2	.833	0	2	3	6	.500	3	3	1.000
Abigail Spears	23	11	12	.478	0	0	2	5	.400	1	3	.333
Jean Andersen	9	4	5	.444	0	3	2	9	.222	2	5	.400
Raquel Kops-Jones	11	4	7	.364	0	2	1	2	.500	2	2	1.000
Fritz Wolmarans	7	2	5	.286	0	0	0	0	–	0	0	–
Anna-Lena Grönefeld	4	1	3	.250	0	0	0	2	.000	0	2	.000
Total	117	58	59	.496	7	17	18	50	.360	14	29	.483

Team totals – all matches

Player	GP	GW	GL	PCT	A	DF	BPW	BPP	BP%	3APW	3APP	3AP%
Men's singles	124	74	50	.597	6	12	26	48	.542	20	35	.571
Women's singles	116	59	57	.509	11	18	24	45	.533	15	34	.441
Men's doubles	119	56	63	.471	7	21	12	36	.333	15	30	.500
Women's doubles	110	58	52	.527	5	14	22	36	.611	21	32	.656
Mixed doubles	117	58	59	.496	7	17	18	50	.360	14	29	.483
Total	586	305	281	.520	36	82	102	215	.474	85	160	.531

== Transactions ==
- November 21, 2013: The Lasers traded Andy Roddick to the Austin Aces for financial consideration.
- February 11, 2014: The Lasers acquired James Blake in a trade with the Boston Lobsters for undisclosed consideration and then protected him in the WTT Marquee Player Draft.
- March 11, 2014: During the WTT Roster Player Draft, the Lasers traded their third round pick (20th overall) and financial consideration for the Washington Kastles' first-round pick (seventh overall) which they used to draft Anna-Lena Grönefeld. The Lasers also traded their fourth round pick (27th overall) and financial consideration for the San Diego Aviators' third round pick (15th overall) which they used to draft Michael Russell. The Lasers also selected Alisa Kleybanova and Jean-Julien Rojer as protected picks in the draft.
- March 11, 2014: The Lasers left Vania King and Rik de Voest unprotected in the WTT Roster Player Draft. De Voest was selected in the fourth round by the Boston Lobsters.
- June 27, 2014: The Lasers signed Olga Govortsova as an injury-replacement roster player.
- July 5, 2014: The Lasers signed Ross Hutchins as an injury-replacement roster player.
- July 8, 2014: The Lasers signed Līga Dekmeijere as a substitute player.
- July 10, 2014: The Lasers signed Jean Andersen as a substitute player.
- July 15, 2014: The Lasers signed Raquel Kops-Jones as a substitute player.
- July 19, 2014: The Lasers signed Abigail Spears as a substitute player.
- July 22, 2014: The Lasers signed Fritz Wolmarans as a substitute player.

== Individual achievements ==
Michael Russell led WTT in game-winning percentage in men's singles.

Olga Govortsova was fourth in WTT in game-winning percentage in mixed doubles and fifth in women's doubles.

== Charitable support ==
During each night of the 2014 season, the WTT team with the most aces received US$1,000 toward a local charity of the team's choice as part of a program called Mylan Aces. In the case of a tie, the award was split accordingly. The Lasers earned $1,000 for the Springfield-Greene County Park Board Scholarship Fund through the program.
