= Sports in Missouri =

Missouri hosts a number of sports teams. Missouri is home to six major league professional sports teams — three in the St. Louis metropolitan area, and three in the Kansas City metropolitan area.

Missouri hosted the 1904 Summer Olympics at Washington University in St. Louis, the first time the games were hosted in the United States.

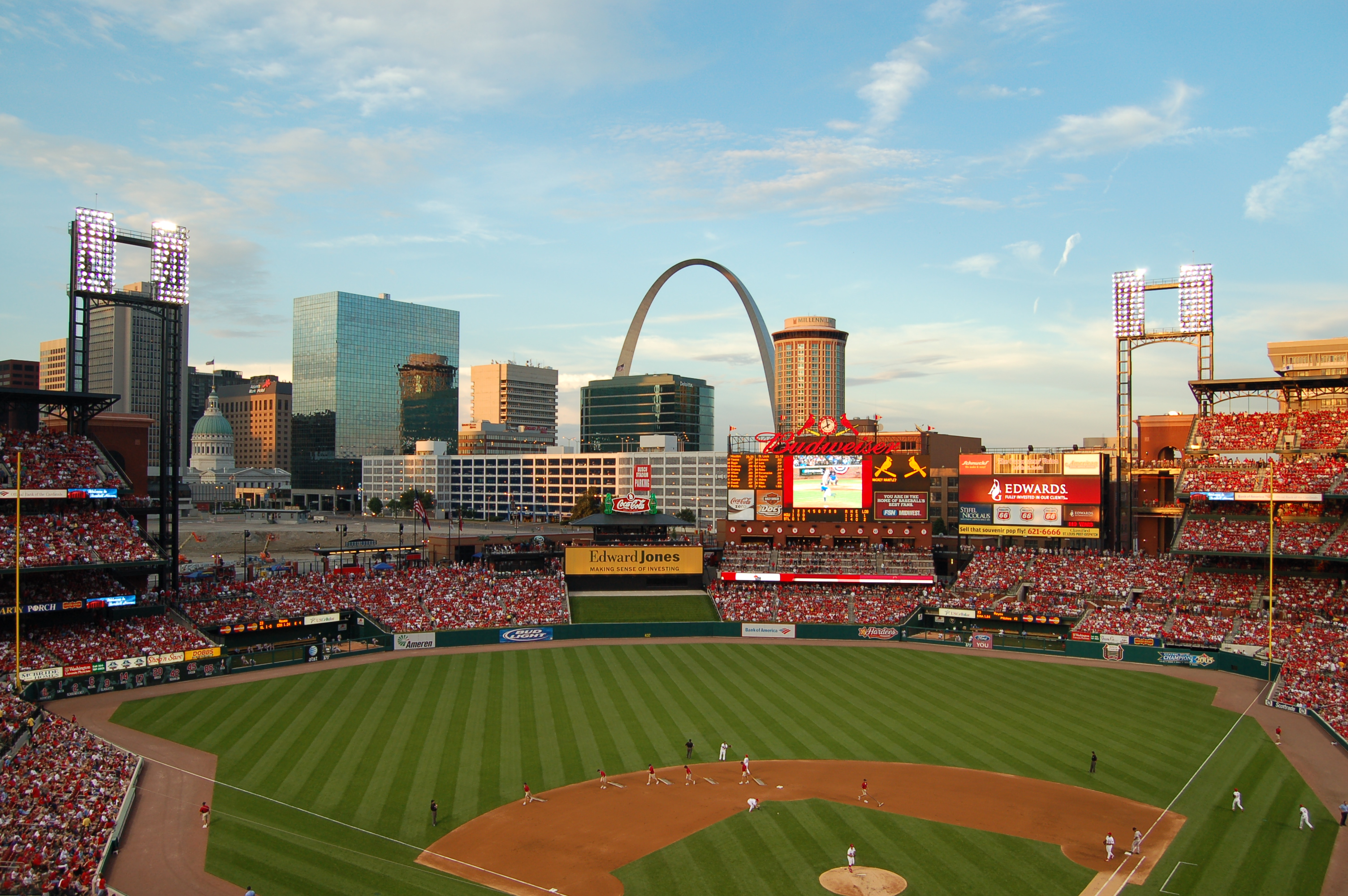
The St. Louis Cardinals playing at Busch Stadium.

== Major league sports teams ==
| Club | Sport | League |
|---|---|---|
| Kansas City Chiefs | American football | National Football League |
| Kansas City Royals | Baseball | Major League Baseball |
| St. Louis Blues | Ice hockey | National Hockey League |
| St. Louis Cardinals | Baseball | Major League Baseball |
| St. Louis City SC | Soccer | Major League Soccer |
| Sporting Kansas City (Note: While representing the Kansas City metropolitan area, Sporting Kansas City's stadium and training facilities are physically located in Kansas City, Kansas.) | Soccer | Major League Soccer |

== Other highest level professional leagues ==
| Kansas City Current | Soccer | National Women's Soccer League |

== Minor leagues ==
| Club | Sport | League |
|---|---|---|
| Club Atletico Saint Louis | Soccer | National Premier Soccer League |
| Demize NPSL | Soccer | National Premier Soccer League |
| Kansas City Blues | Rugby | USA Rugby Division 1 |
| Kansas City Comets | Indoor Soccer | Major Arena Soccer League |
| Kansas City Mavericks | Ice hockey | ECHL |
| Kansas City Monarchs (Note: The Monarchs, renamed from T-Bones after the 2020 season, play home games on the Kansas side of the metropolitan area.) | Baseball | American Association |
| Kansas City Power | Australian rules football | USAFL |
| Kansas City Rogues | Rugby | USA Rugby Division 3 |
| Kansas City Storm | American football - Women | United Women's Football Association |
| Ozarks Springbirds | Baseball | Texas League |
| Springfield Lasers | Tennis | World TeamTennis |
| St. Joseph Goats | Arena football | The Arena League |
| St. Louis Ambush | Indoor soccer | Major Arena Soccer League |
| St. Louis BattleHawks | American football | UFL |
| St. Louis City 2 | Soccer | MLS Next Pro |
| St. Louis Lions | Soccer | USL League 2 |
| Sporting Kansas City II (Note: SKC2 splits its home games between venues in Missouri and Kansas. Its primary home stadium is in Lawrence, Kansas, and it also plays home games at Sporting's training facility in Kansas City, Missouri.) | Soccer | MLS Next Pro |

== Former teams ==
=== Teams which are no longer in Missouri ===
| Club | Sport | League |
|---|---|---|
| Kansas City Athletics (moved from Philadelphia in 1955; moved to Oakland, California after the 1967 season and are now the Oakland Athletics) | Baseball | Major League Baseball |
| Kansas City Kings (moved from Cincinnati in 1972; moved to Sacramento in 1985 and are now the Sacramento Kings; prior to locating in Kansas City, they were known as the Cincinnati Royals) | Basketball | National Basketball Association |
| Kansas City Scouts (1974 expansion team, moved to Denver, Colorado in 1976 and became the Colorado Rockies, and would move again to Newark, New Jersey; now called the New Jersey Devils) | Ice hockey | National Hockey League |
| Sporting Kansas City (moved home games to Kansas City, Kansas in 2008; still have front office and practice facilities in Kansas City, Missouri) | Soccer | Major League Soccer |
| St. Louis Browns (moved from Milwaukee in 1902; moved to Baltimore, Maryland after the 1953 season and are now the Baltimore Orioles) | Baseball | Major League Baseball |
| St. Louis Cardinals (moved from Chicago in 1960; moved to Tempe, Arizona in 1988 as the Phoenix Cardinals and now play in Glendale, Arizona as the Arizona Cardinals) | American football | National Football League |
| St. Louis Hawks (moved from Milwaukee in 1955; moved to Atlanta in 1968 and became the Atlanta Hawks) | Basketball | National Basketball Association |
| St. Louis Rams (moved from Anaheim, California in 1995; moved back to Los Angeles in 2016 and resumed the team's former identity of Los Angeles Rams) | American football | National Football League |

=== Defunct ===
| Club | Sport | League |
|---|---|---|
| FC Kansas City (folded in 2017 and roster transferred to Utah Royals FC; not related to the present-day Kansas City Current, though the Current inherited the roster of Utah Royals FC after that team folded in 2020) | Women's soccer | National Women's Soccer League |
| Kansas City Blues/Cowboys (active 1924–1926, folded) | American football | National Football League |
| Kansas City Monarchs (charter member of Negro National League, 1920. Played in Kansas City, MO, until moving to Grand Rapids, Michigan in 1956 after sending more players to Major League Baseball than any other Negro league team. The area's current American Association team renamed itself "Monarchs" in honor of this team shortly before the 2021 season.) | Negro league baseball | Negro National League Negro American League |
| Kansas City Phantoms | Indoor football | Champions Indoor Football |
| Kansas City Sizzlers (moved to Topeka as the Topeka Sizzlers in 1986) | Basketball | Continental Basketball Association |
| Missouri River Otters (franchise folded in 2006) | Ice hockey | United Hockey League |
| River City Rascals (franchise folded in 2019) | Baseball | Frontier League |
| Saint Louis Athletica (franchise folded in June 2010) | Women's soccer | Women's Professional Soccer |
| Saint Louis FC (folded after the 2020 season) | Soccer | USL Championship |
| Spirits of St. Louis (franchise played its home games in St. Louis from 1974 through 1976; franchise folded when the ABA merged with the NBA) | Basketball | American Basketball Association |
| St. Charles Chill (folded in 2014 after one season) | Ice hockey | Central Hockey League |
| St. Louis All Stars (active in 1923 only) | American football | National Football League |
| St. Louis Bombers (charter BAA franchise in 1946, joined the NBA when it formed in 1949; ceased operations in 1950) | Basketball | National Basketball Association |
| St. Louis Eagles (1934 relocation of the original Ottawa Senators, folded after the 1934–35 season) | Ice hockey | National Hockey League |
| St. Louis Gunners (independent team, joined the NFL for the last three weeks of the 1934 season and folded thereafter) | American football | National Football League |
| St. Louis Giants/Stars (1906–1931) | Negro league baseball | Negro National League |

== College sports ==
There are six NCAA Division I teams in the state, one of which started a transition from NCAA Division II in July 2022. The only D-I program in the Football Bowl Subdivision is the Missouri Tigers, with the Missouri State Bears and Lady Bears joining them in 2025. As of the 2024–25 school year, 13 schools play in NCAA Division II, with nine in the Great Lakes Valley Conference and four in the Mid-America Intercollegiate Athletics Association.

| Team | City | Division | Primary conference |
|---|---|---|---|
| Kansas City Roos | Kansas City | NCAA Division I | Summit League |
| Lindenwood Lions | St. Charles | NCAA Division I | Ohio Valley Conference |
| Missouri Tigers | Columbia | NCAA Division I | Southeastern Conference |
| Missouri State Bears and Lady Bears | Springfield | NCAA Division I | Missouri Valley Conference (Conference USA in 2025) |
| Saint Louis Billikens | St. Louis | NCAA Division I | Atlantic 10 Conference |
| Southeast Missouri Redhawks | Cape Girardeau | NCAA Division I | Ohio Valley Conference |
| Central Missouri Mules and Jennies | Warrensburg | NCAA Division II | MIAA |
| Drury Panthers | Springfield | NCAA Division II | Great Lakes Valley |
| Lincoln Blue Tigers | Jefferson City | NCAA Division II | Great Lakes Valley |
| Maryville Saints | Town and Country (Note: The campus has a St. Louis mailing address.) | NCAA Division II | Great Lakes Valley |
| Missouri S&T Miners | Rolla | NCAA Division II | Great Lakes Valley |
| Missouri Southern Lions | Joplin | NCAA Division II | MIAA |
| Missouri Western Griffons | St. Joseph | NCAA Division II | MIAA |
| Northwest Missouri State Bearcats | Maryville | NCAA Division II | MIAA |
| Rockhurst Hawks | Kansas City | NCAA Division II | Great Lakes Valley |
| Southwest Baptist Bearcats | Bolivar | NCAA Division II | Great Lakes Valley |
| Truman Bulldogs | Kirksville | NCAA Division II | Great Lakes Valley |
| UMSL Tritons | St. Louis | NCAA Division II | Great Lakes Valley |
| William Jewell Cardinals | Liberty | NCAA Division II | Great Lakes Valley |
| Fontbonne Griffins | Clayton | NCAA Division III | St. Louis (closing in 2025) |
| Washington University Bears | St. Louis | NCAA Division III | University Athletic Association |
| Webster Gorloks | Webster Groves | NCAA Division III | St. Louis |
| Westminster Blue Jays | Fulton | NCAA Division III | St. Louis |

== See also ==
- Sports in Kansas City
- Sports in St. Louis
- Soccer in St. Louis
