= Khachatur Khachatryan =

Armenian scientist and mathematician

- Born: 01.07.1982; Yerevan, Armenia
- Education: Yerevan State University
- Awards: Prize of the President of the Republic of Armenia Winner of the first prize after Sergey Mergelyan for young scientists (Mathematics and Informatics), 1st-class prize of the RA NAS "Best scientific work of 2013" competition, 2014թ., 2016թ., 2018թ., 2020թ., 2021թ. Winner of the "Efficient Researcher" competition (Natural Sciences) (Top 100)
- Scientific career
- Fields: Differential equations, Mathematical analysis, Mathematical physics
- Workplaces: Institute of Mathematics of National Academy of Sciences of Armenia, Yerevan State University, Russian-Armenian University

Khachatur Khachatryan (Armenian: Խաչատուր Աղավարդի Խաչատրյան; born 1 July 1982) is an Armenian scientist and mathematician. Associate Member of the NAS of the Republic of Armenia (2026), Doctor of physico-mathematical sciences (2011), Professor (2018).

== Early life and education ==
Khachatur Khachatryan was born on 1 July 1982, in Yerevan, Armenia.

In 1998 he graduated from Phys. math. school No. 1 named after A. Shahinyan with honors. He graduated from the Faculty of Mathematics of Yerevan State University in 2004 with honors (Department of Differential Equations and Functional Analysis).

In 2004, he entered graduate school (aspirant) at Yerevan State University. In 2006 he defended his PhD thesis at the specialized council 050 of Yerevan State University, on the topic "On factorization methods for solving a certain class of integral and integro-differential equations on the semi-axis.”

In 2011, in the specialized council 050 of Yerevan State University, he defended his doctoral dissertation on the topic “Questions of the solvability of some nonlinear integral and integro-differential equations with non-compact operators in the critical case”.

== Career ==
Since 2026 Associate Member of the NAS of the Republic of Armenia․

Since 2018 Khachatryan is a full professor of Mathematics, and the scientific supervisor of seven candidate dissertations (PhD theses).

He teaches courses in functional analysis, differential equations, equations of mathematical physics, calculus of variations, mathematical analysis, nonlinear operator equations, convolution type equations.

Since 2005, he has been working in the Department of Methods of Mathematical Physics of the Institute of Mathematics of the National Academy of Sciences of Armenia. From 2004 to 2006 and since 2012 he teaches at Yerevan State University (YSU). In 2015-2017 he taught at the Yerevan branch of Moscow State University. Since 2019 he has been teaching at the Russian-Armenian Slavic University. Since 2019, the main executor of the Russian Science Foundation grant (project No. 19-11-00223) Moscow State University. Since 2020 he has been head of the Department of Differential Equations, and from 2021, head of the Department of Theory of Functions and Differential Equations, Yerevan State University.

== State awards and honorary titles ==
- 2014 Winner of the "Efficient Researcher" competition (Natural Sciences) (Top 100)
- 2013 1st-class prize of the RA NAS "Best scientific work of 2013" competition,
- 2013 Winner of the first prize after Sergey Mergelyan for young scientists (Mathematics and Informatics)
- 2021 Winner of the "Efficient Researcher" competition (Natural Sciences) (Top 100)
- 2020 Winner of the "Efficient Researcher" competition (Natural Sciences) (Top 100)
- 2018 Winner of the "Efficient Researcher" competition (Natural Sciences) (Top 100)
- 2016 Winner of the "Efficient Researcher" competition (Natural Sciences) (Top 100)
- 2019 Prize of the President of the Republic of Armenia
