= Joachim Bjerke =

Norwegian tennis player & Coach

- Country (sports): Norway
- Residence: Oslo, Norway
- Born: 11 November 1994 (age 30); Oslo, Norway
- Height: 1.78 m (5 ft 10 in)
- Turned pro: 2010
- Retired: 2016 (last match)
- Plays: Right-handed (two-handed backhand)
- Prize money: US$5,884

Singles
- Career record: 8–7
- Career titles: 7
- Highest ranking: No. 912 (19 May 2014)

Other tournaments

Doubles
- Career record: 0–1
- Career titles: 0
- Last updated on: 07 March 2022.

Joachim Bjerke (born 11 November 1994) is a former Norwegian professional tennis player and coach. He reached a career-high singles ranking of world No. 912 on 19 May 2014. He was also part of the Norwegian Davis Cup Team.

== Career ==
In 2012, Joachim won the Norwegian championship, beating Stian Boretti (former 375 on the ATP ranking) in the final, and has several national titles to his name. His Norwegian title in 2012 was seen as sensational due to the fact that he was under 18, and knocked out several of Norway's best players on his way to the final. Among other players, such as Norwegian rival Øystein Steiro and former double partner Mons Knudtzon, Bjerke has been praised for his strong forehand and rapid footwork.

== Coaching ==
Bjerke has recently been known for coaching Casper Ruud.
