= Tomislav Brkić =

Bosnian-Herzegovinian tennis player

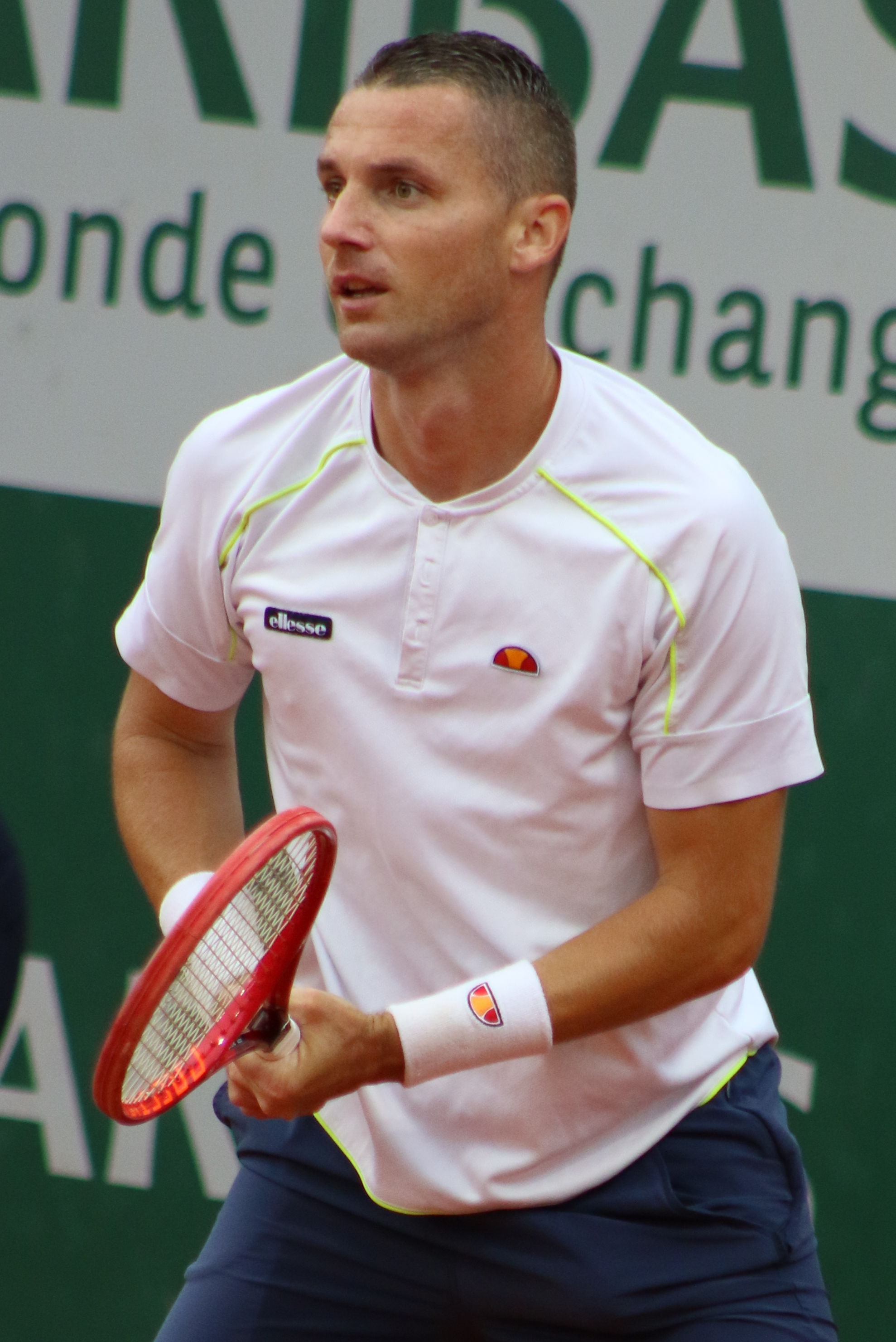
- Brkić at the 2021 French Open
- Country (sports): Bosnia and Herzegovina
- Residence: Ljubuški, Bosnia and Herzegovina
- Born: 9 March 1990 (age 36) Mostar, SR Bosnia and Herzegovina, SFR Yugoslavia
- Height: 1.85 m (6 ft 1 in)
- Turned pro: 2008
- Retired: 2026
- Plays: Right-handed (two-handed backhand)
- Coach: Alberto Castellani
- Prize money: US $707,468

Singles
- Career record: 3–9
- Career titles: 0
- Highest ranking: No. 212 (6 October 2014)

Grand Slam singles results
- Australian Open: Q2 (2015)
- Wimbledon: Q2 (2018)
- US Open: Q1 (2015, 2018)

Doubles
- Career record: 80–71
- Career titles: 2
- Highest ranking: No. 40 (17 January 2022)

Grand Slam doubles results
- Australian Open: 3R (2023)
- French Open: QF (2021)
- Wimbledon: 3R (2021)
- US Open: 2R (2021)

Tomislav Brkić ([tǒmislaʋ bř̩ːkitɕ]; born 9 March 1990) is a Bosnian former professional tennis player specializing in doubles. Brkić achieved a career-high in doubles of World No. 40 on 17 January 2022. He has won two ATP doubles titles with Nikola Ćaćić and with Francisco Cabral.

== Professional career ==
2021 was the most successful year in Brkić's career. Partnered with Nikola Ćaćić, he won his first ATP title at the 2021 Argentina Open and reached the final of the 2021 Andalucía Open and semifinal at 2021 Serbia Open.

On his Grand Slam debut, he reached the second round of the 2021 Australian Open partnering with Aisam-ul-Haq Qureshi.

The pair Brkić/Ćaćić also reached the quarterfinals of the 2021 French Open for their best showing in their careers defeating fourth seeds M. Granollers/H. Zeballos and M. González/S. Bolelli en route.

Brkić reached a career high of World No. 40 in doubles on 17 January 2022. At the 2023 Australian Open he reached the third round with Gonzalo Escobar for the first time at this Major.

In June 2026, Brkić announced his retirement from professional tennis.

== ATP career finals ==
=== Doubles: 5 (2 titles, 3 runner-ups) ===
Winner – Legend Grand Slam tournaments (0–0) ATP World Tour Finals (0–0) ATP World Tour Masters 1000 (0–0) ATP World Tour 500 Series (0–0) ATP World Tour 250 Series (2–3)	Finals by surface Hard (0–1) Clay (2–2) Grass (0–0)

Result	W–L	Date	Tournament	Tier	Surface	Partner	Opponents	Score
Win	1–0	Mar 2021	Argentina Open, Argentina	250 Series	Clay	(Serbia) Nikola Ćaćić	(Uruguay) Ariel Behar (Ecuador) Gonzalo Escobar	6–3, 7–5
Loss	1–1	Apr 2021	Andalucía Open, Spain	250 Series	Clay	(Serbia) Nikola Ćaćić	(Uruguay) Ariel Behar (Ecuador) Gonzalo Escobar	2–6, 4–6
Loss	1–2	Jul 2021	Croatia Open, Croatia	250 Series	Clay	(Serbia) Nikola Ćaćić	(Brazil) Fernando Romboli (Spain) David Vega Hernández	3–6, 5–7
Loss	1–3	Oct 2021	Kremlin Cup, Russia	250 Series	Hard (i)	(Serbia) Nikola Ćaćić	(Finland) Harri Heliövaara (Netherlands) Matwé Middelkoop	5–7, 6–4, [9–11]
Win	2–3	Jul 2022	Swiss Open Gstaad, Switzerland	250 Series	Clay	(Portugal) Francisco Cabral	(Netherlands) Robin Haase (Austria) Philipp Oswald	6–4, 6–4

== Challenger and Futures finals ==
=== Singles: 30 (16–14) ===
Legend (singles) ATP Challenger Tour (0–0) ITF Futures Tour (16–14)	Titles by surface Hard (2–3) Clay (14–11) Grass (0–0) Carpet (0–0)

Result	W–L	Date	Tournament	Tier	Surface	Opponent	Score
Loss	0–1	May 2011	Bosnia & Herzegovina F2, Sarajevo	Futures	Clay	(Serbia) Miljan Zekić	6–7^{(1–7)}, 2–6
Win	1–1	May 2011	Bosnia & Herzegovina F4, Prijedor	Futures	Clay	(Bosnia and Herzegovina) Mirza Bašić	6–4, 7–5
Win	2–1	Jan 2012	Turkey F1, Antalya	Futures	Hard	(Czech Republic) Michal Konečný	6–4, 6–1
Loss	2–2	Apr 2012	Turkey F15, Antalya	Futures	Hard	(Moldova) Radu Albot	1–6, 6–4, 2–6
Loss	2–3	Apr 2012	Turkey F16, Antalya	Futures	Hard	(Moldova) Radu Albot	6–3, 4–6, 6–7^{(3–7)}
Loss	2–4	Aug 2013	Croatia F8, Vinkovci	Futures	Clay	(Croatia) Toni Androić	3–6, 4–6
Win	3–4	Nov 2013	Croatia F16, Bol	Futures	Clay	(Italy) Salvatore Caruso	4–6, 7–5, 7–5
Win	4–4	Mar 2014	Turkey F5, Antalya	Futures	Hard	(Bosnia and Herzegovina) Aldin Šetkić	6–2, 3–6, 7–5
Loss	4–5	May 2014	Bosnia & Herzegovina F2, Prijedor	Futures	Clay	(Serbia) Laslo Djere	3–6, 2–6
Loss	4–6	Jun 2014	Bosnia & Herzegovina F4, Kiseljak	Futures	Clay	(Bosnia and Herzegovina) Mirza Bašić	5–7, 4–6
Win	5–6	Aug 2014	Italy F27, Appiano	Futures	Clay	(Italy) Daniele Giorgini	7–6^{(7–3)}, 7–6^{(10–8)}
Win	6–6	Aug 2014	Italy F28, Este	Futures	Clay	(Italy) Francesco Picco	6–2, 7–6^{(8–6)}
Win	7–6	Sep 2014	Croatia F16, Bol	Futures	Clay	(Italy) Riccardo Sinicropi	7–5, 6–2
Loss	7–7	Apr 2015	Turkey F13, Antalya	Futures	Hard	(Austria) Dennis Novak	3–6, 3–6
Win	8–7	May 2015	Croatia F8, Bol	Futures	Clay	(Czech Republic) Václav Šafránek	6–2, 6–4
Win	9–7	Nov 2015	Turkey F44, Antalya	Futures	Clay	(Austria) Gibril Diarra	7–5, 6–2
Loss	9–8	Nov 2015	Turkey F45, Antalya	Futures	Clay	(Croatia) Mate Delić	6–3, 4–6, 1–6
Win	10–8	Aug 2016	Serbia F5, Subotica	Futures	Clay	(Montenegro) Ljubomir Čelebić	6–4, 6–2
Loss	10–9	Oct 2016	Croatia F11, Bol	Futures	Clay	(Italy) Riccardo Bellotti	3–6, 3–6
Win	11–9	Feb 2017	Tunisia F6, Hammamet	Futures	Clay	(Croatia) Kristijan Mesaroš	6–1, 4–1 ret.
Loss	11–10	Feb 2017	Tunisia F7, Hammamet	Futures	Clay	(Italy) Stefano Travaglia	7–6^{(9–7)}, 3–6, 3–6
Loss	11–11	Mar 2017	Tunisia F8, Hammamet	Futures	Clay	(Serbia) Miljan Zekić	7–6^{(9–7)}, 3–6, 4–6
Win	12–11	Jun 2017	Bosnia & Herzegovina F2, Brčko	Futures	Clay	(United States) Evan King	7–6^{(9–7)}, 6–3
Loss	12–12	Aug 2017	Italy F25, Cornaiano	Futures	Clay	(Egypt) Mohamed Safwat	4–6, 3–6
Win	13–12	Aug 2017	Serbia F2, Novi Sad	Futures	Clay	(Croatia) Nino Serdarušić	6–2, 6–7^{(5–7)}, 6–3
Win	14–12	Sep 2017	Italy F28, Trieste	Futures	Clay	(Italy) Adelchi Virgili	7–6^{(7–2)}, 4–6, 7–6^{(8–6)}
Loss	14–13	Sep 2017	Kazakhstan F6, Shymkent	Futures	Clay	(Spain) Enrique López Pérez	6–2, 4–6, 4–6
Win	15–13	Nov 2017	Italy F36, Santa Margherita di Pula	Futures	Clay	(Italy) Lorenzo Sonego	7–5, 6–4
Win	16–13	Dec 2017	Turkey F46, Antalya	Futures	Clay	(Serbia) Nikola Ćaćić	7–6^{(7–2)}, 2–6, 7–6^{(9–7)}
Loss	16–14	Mar 2018	Italy F4, Santa Margherita di Pula	Futures	Clay	(Hungary) Attila Balázs	2–6, 5–7

=== Doubles: 55 (41–14) ===
Legend (doubles) ATP Challenger Tour (12–5) ITF Futures Tour (29–9)	Titles by surface Hard (6–6) Clay (35–7) Grass (0–0) Carpet (0–1)

Result	W–L	Date	Tournament	Tier	Surface	Partner	Opponents	Score
Win	1–0	Jun 2008	Bosnia Herzegovina F4, Prijedor	Futures	Clay	(Croatia) Milan Bradarić	(Serbia) David Savić (Croatia) Vilim Višak	6–2, 6–3
Win	2–0	Jul 2009	Germany F11, Cologne	Futures	Clay	(Croatia) Ante Pavić	(Argentina) Daniel Caracciolo (Germany) Jacek Szygowski	6–3, 7–6^{(7–2)}
Loss	2–1	Oct 2010	Turkey F10, Antalya	Futures	Hard	(Serbia) Nikola Ćaćić	(Ukraine) Artem Smirnov (Hungary) Róbert Varga	4–6, 4–6
Win	3–1	Oct 2010	Croatia F8, Dubrovnik	Futures	Clay	(Bosnia and Herzegovina) Damir Džumhur	(Croatia) Kristijan Mesaroš (Croatia) Marin Milan	2–6, 6–1, [11–9]
Win	4–1	Aug 2011	Croatia F7, Vinkovci	Futures	Clay	(Croatia) Marin Franjičević	(Croatia) Mislav Hižak (Slovenia) Blaž Rola	3–6, 6–3, [10–7]
Loss	4–2	Nov 2011	Turkey F32, Antalya	Futures	Hard	(Serbia) Ivan Bjelica	(Bosnia and Herzegovina) Damir Džumhur (Bosnia and Herzegovina) Aldin Šetkić	4–6, 3–6
Win	5–2	Jan 2012	Turkey F1, Antalya	Futures	Hard	(Bosnia and Herzegovina) Aldin Šetkić	(Sweden) Carl Bergman (Sweden) Patrik Brydolf	3–6, 7–6^{(7–2)}, [10–8]
Loss	5–3	Apr 2012	Turkey F15, Antalya	Futures	Hard	(Croatia) Mislav Hižak	(New Zealand) Marcus Daniell (Germany) Gero Kretschmer	0–6, 2–6
Loss	5–4	Aug 2012	Croatia F8, Vinkovci	Futures	Clay	(Bosnia and Herzegovina) Aldin Šetkić	(Croatia) Mislav Hižak (Slovenia) Blaž Rola	4–6, 6–7^{(3–7)}
Win	6–4	Sep 2012	Croatia F9, Osijek	Futures	Clay	(Bosnia and Herzegovina) Aldin Šetkić	(Serbia) Ivan Bjelica (Croatia) Matej Sabanov	6–4, 6–1
Win	7–4	Dec 2012	Turkey F47, Antalya	Futures	Hard	(Croatia) Dino Marcan	(Moldova) Andrei Ciumac (Ukraine) Volodymyr Uzhylovskyi	6–1, 7–6^{(7–5)}
Loss	7–5	Jan 2013	Germany F3, Kaarst	Futures	Carpet (i)	(Croatia) Nikola Mektić	(Netherlands) Stephan Fransen (Netherlands) Wesley Koolhof	4–6, 6–7^{(6–8)}
Win	8–5	Mar 2013	Sarajevo, Bosnia/Herzegovina	Challenger	Hard (i)	(Bosnia and Herzegovina) Mirza Bašić	(Slovakia) Karol Beck (Slovakia) Igor Zelenay	6–3, 7–5
Win	9–5	Mar 2013	Croatia F5, Rovinj	Futures	Clay	(Canada) Steven Diez	(Austria) Nikolaus Moser (Austria) Tristan-Samuel Weissborn	6–2, 6–2
Win	10–5	Mar 2013	Croatia F6, Vrsar	Futures	Clay	(Croatia) Mate Delić	(Czech Republic) Lukáš Maršoun (Czech Republic) Dominik Süč	2–6, 7–6^{(7–3)}, [10–8]
Win	11–5	Jun 2013	Bosnia & Herzegovina F3, Doboj	Futures	Clay	(Croatia) Duje Kekez	(Bosnia and Herzegovina) Nerman Fatić (Bosnia and Herzegovina) Ismar Gorčić	6–3, 6–4
Win	12–5	Aug 2013	Serbia F8, Novi Sad	Futures	Clay	(Croatia) Duje Kekez	(Bosnia and Herzegovina) Ismar Gorčić (Serbia) Ilija Vučić	6–3, 7–6^{(7–1)}
Win	13–5	Aug 2013	Croatia F7, Čakovec	Futures	Clay	(Croatia) Duje Kekez	(Italy) Francesco Borgo (Italy) Andrea Patracchini	7–5, 6–1
Win	14–5	Oct 2013	Croatia F10, Solin	Futures	Clay	(Croatia) Mate Delić	(Russia) Aleksandre Kondulukov (Russia) Alexey Kondulukov	6–3, 4–6, [10–4]
Loss	14–6	Oct 2013	Croatia F11, Dubrovnik	Futures	Clay	(Croatia) Mate Delić	(Czech Republic) Marek Michalička (Czech Republic) Dominik Süč	6–7^{(2–7)}, 1–6
Loss	14–7	Dec 2013	Croatia F17, Bol	Futures	Clay	(Croatia) Antonio Šančić	(Serbia) Nikola Ćirić (Serbia) Goran Tošić	w/o
Win	15–7	Dec 2013	Turkey F50, Antalya	Futures	Hard	(Bosnia and Herzegovina) Aldin Šetkić	(Netherlands) Alban Meuffels (Lithuania) Lukas Mugevičius	6–2, 6–1
Win	16–7	Feb 2014	Croatia F1, Zagreb	Futures	Hard (i)	(Slovenia) Janez Semrajč	(Croatia) Dino Marcan (Croatia) Antonio Šančić	7–6^{(7–3)}, 7–6^{(9–7)}
Loss	16–8	Mar 2014	Turkey F6, Antalya	Futures	Hard	(Austria) Bastian Trinker	(Bosnia and Herzegovina) Aldin Šetkić (Italy) Erik Crepaldi	4–6, 4–6
Win	17–8	May 2014	Bosnia & Herzegovina F1, Doboj	Futures	Clay	(Serbia) Nikola Ćaćić	(Serbia) Ivan Milivojević (Serbia) Bojan Zdravković	6–1, 6–3
Win	18–8	May 2014	Bosnia & Herzegovina F2, Prijedor	Futures	Clay	(Serbia) Nikola Ćaćić	(Serbia) Darko Jandrić (Croatia) Ante Marinčić	6–3, 6–2
Win	19–8	Jun 2014	Bosnia & Herzegovina F4, Kiseljak	Futures	Clay	(Croatia) Ante Marinčić	(Montenegro) Ljubomir Čelebić (Italy) Giorgio Portaluri	6–2, 6–2
Win	20–8	Aug 2014	Italy F27, Appiano	Futures	Clay	(Bosnia and Herzegovina) Mirza Bašić	(Belgium) Yannik Reuter (France) Maxime Teixeira	6–3, 6–4
Win	21–8	Nov 2015	Turkey F44, Antalya	Futures	Clay	(Serbia) Darko Jandrić	(Turkey) Tuna Altuna (Turkey) Cem İlkel	7–6^{(7–3)}, 6–3
Win	22–8	Jan 2016	Spain F1, Castelldefels	Futures	Clay	(Portugal) Gonçalo Oliveira	(France) Samuel Bensoussan (Czech Republic) Michal Schmid	6–2, 3–6, [10–1]
Win	23–8	Feb 2016	Spain F2, Paguera	Futures	Clay	(Poland) Kamil Majchrzak	(Spain) Carlos Taberner (Japan) Kento Yamada	6–3, 6–4
Win	24–8	Feb 2016	Spain F3, Paguera	Futures	Clay	(Portugal) Gonçalo Oliveira	(Italy) Pietro Rondoni (Italy) Jacopo Stefanini	6–7^{(6–8)}, 6–3, [10–6]
Win	25–8	Jun 2016	Netherlands F2, Breda	Futures	Clay	(Poland) Kamil Majchrzak	(Egypt) Karim-Mohamed Maamoun (Serbia) Ilija Vučić	6–0, 6–2
Win	26–8	Jul 2016	France F12, Montauban	Futures	Clay	(Brazil) Caio Zampieri	(Spain) Pedro Martínez (Morocco) Lamine Ouahab	6–1, 6–2
Win	27–8	Jan 2017	USA F3, Plantation	Futures	Clay	(Serbia) Nikola Ćaćić	(Spain) Jaume Pla Malfeito (Spain) Miguel Semmler	4–6, 6–1, [10–3]
Loss	27–9	Jan 2017	USA F4, Sunrise	Futures	Clay	(Serbia) Nikola Ćaćić	(Germany) Peter Torebko (Austria) Bastian Trinker	6–7^{(3–7)}, 6–4, [7–10]
Win	28–9	Feb 2017	Tunisia F7, Hammamet	Futures	Clay	(Serbia) Nikola Ćaćić	(Brazil) Oscar José Gutierrez (Brazil) Nicolas Santos	6–3, 6–2
Win	29–9	Nov 2017	Pune, India	Challenger	Hard	(Croatia) Ante Pavić	(Spain) Pedro Martínez (Spain) Adrián Menéndez Maceiras	6–1, 7–6^{(7–5)}
Win	30–9	Mar 2018	Italy F4, Santa Margherita di Pula	Futures	Clay	(Serbia) Milan Radojković	(Argentina) Franco Capalbo (Argentina) Gerónimo Espín Busleiman	6–3, 4–6, [10–7]
Win	31–9	Apr 2018	Italy F7, Santa Margherita di Pula	Futures	Clay	(Serbia) Milan Radojković	(Argentina) Franco Capalbo (Argentina) Gerónimo Espín Busleiman	4–6, 6–3, [10–8]
Win	32–9	Jun 2018	Poprad-Tatry, Slovakia	Challenger	Clay	(Croatia) Ante Pavić	(Serbia) Nikola Ćaćić (Switzerland) Luca Margaroli	6–3, 4–6, [16–14]
Loss	32–10	Jul 2018	Perugia, Italy	Challenger	Clay	(Croatia) Ante Pavić	(Italy) Daniele Bracciali (Italy) Matteo Donati	3–6, 6–3, [7–10]
Win	33–10	Jul 2018	Padova, Italy	Challenger	Clay	(Croatia) Ante Pavić	(Italy) Walter Trusendi (Italy) Andrea Vavassori	6–3, 7–6^{(7–4)}
Loss	33–11	Jan 2019	Burnie, Australia	Challenger	Hard	(Bosnia and Herzegovina) Mirza Bašić	(South Africa) Lloyd Harris (Israel) Dudi Sela	3–6, 7–6^{(7–3)}, [8–10]
Loss	33–12	Feb 2019	Bergamo, Italy	Challenger	Hard (i)	(Germany) Dustin Brown	(Lithuania) Laurynas Grigelis (Czech Republic) Zdeněk Kolář	5–7, 6–7^{(7–9)}
Loss	33–13	Apr 2019	Barletta, Italy	Challenger	Clay	(Croatia) Tomislav Draganja	(Ukraine) Denys Molchanov (Slovakia) Igor Zelenay	6–7^{(1–7)}, 4–6
Win	34–13	Jun 2019	Milan, Italy	Challenger	Clay	(Croatia) Ante Pavić	(Belarus) Andrei Vasilevski (Italy) Andrea Vavassori	7–6^{(8–6)}, 6–2
Win	35–13	Jul 2019	Perugia, Italy	Challenger	Clay	(Croatia) Ante Pavić	(Brazil) Rogério Dutra Silva (Poland) Szymon Walków	6–4, 6–3
Win	36–13	Aug 2019	Cordenons, Italy	Challenger	Clay	(Croatia) Ante Pavić	(Serbia) Nikola Ćaćić (Croatia) Antonio Šančić	6–2, 6–3
Win	37–13	Aug 2019	L'Aquila, Italy	Challenger	Clay	(Croatia) Ante Pavić	(Switzerland) Luca Margaroli (Italy) Andrea Vavassori	6–3, 6–2
Win	38–13	Sep 2019	Biella, Italy	Challenger	Clay	(Croatia) Ante Pavić	(Uruguay) Ariel Behar (Kazakhstan) Andrey Golubev	7–6^{(7–2)}, 6–4
Win	39–13	Sep 2020	Forli, Italy	Challenger	Clay	(Serbia) Nikola Ćaćić	(Italy) Andrea Vavassori (Kazakhstan) Andrey Golubev	3–6, 7–5, [10–3]
Win	40–13	Oct 2020	Parma, Italy	Challenger	Clay	(El Salvador) Marcelo Arévalo	(Uruguay) Ariel Behar (Ecuador) Gonzalo Escobar	6–4, 6–4
Loss	40–14	Apr 2021	Belgrade, Serbia	Challenger	Clay	(Serbia) Nikola Ćaćić	(Argentina) Guillermo Durán (Argentina) Andrés Molteni	4–6, 4–6
Win	41–14	Oct 2022	Parma, Italy	Challenger	Clay	(Serbia) Nikola Ćaćić	(Venezuela) Luis David Martínez (Slovakia) Igor Zelenay	6–2, 6–2

== Davis Cup ==
Group membership World Group (0–3) Group I (3–1) Group II (9–9) Group III (6–3) Group IV (0–0)	Matches by surface Hard (8–9) Clay (8–6) Grass (0–0) Carpet (2–1)	Matches by Location Outdoor (9–7) Indoor (9–7)	Matches by Type Singles (3–8) Doubles (15–8)

- ▲ ▼ indicates the outcome of the Davis Cup match followed by the score, date, place of event, the zonal classification and its phase, and the court surface.

Davis Cup results
Rubber outcome	No.	Rubber	Match type (partner if any)	Opponent nation	Opponent player(s)	Score
▲3–0; 7 May 2009; Masterclass Tennis & Fitness Club, Yerevan, Armenia; Europe/Africa Round Robin; Clay (outdoor)
Victory	1.	III	Doubles (with Mirza Bašić)	Ghana	Emmanuel Mensah / Mohammed Salifu	6–4, 7–6^{(8–6)}
▲3–0; 8 May 2009; Masterclass Tennis & Fitness Club, Yerevan, Armenia; Europe/Africa round robin; Clay (outdoor)
Victory	2.	III	Doubles (with Mirza Bašić)	Estonia	Mait Künnap / Jürgen Zopp	7–5, 7–6^{(7–2)}
▼1–2; 9 May 2009; Masterclass Tennis & Fitness Club, Yerevan, Armenia; Europe/Africa round robin; Clay (outdoor)
Victory	3.	III	Doubles (with Mirza Bašić)	Lithuania	Daniel Lencina-Ribes / Gvidas Sabeckis	6–3, 6–7^{(5–7)}, 6–3
▼0–3; 10 May 2009; Masterclass Tennis & Fitness Club, Yerevan, Armenia; Europe/Africa round robin; Clay (outdoor)
Defeat	4.	III	Doubles (with Mirza Bašić)	Moldova	Roman Borvanov / Andrei Ciumac	6–7^{(4–7)}, 6–2, 3–6
▼1–2; 11 May 2009; Masterclass Tennis & Fitness Club, Yerevan, Armenia; Europe/Africa round robin; Clay (outdoor)
Defeat	5.	I	Singles	Norway	Philip Riise-Hansen	4–6, 6–4, 2–6
Victory	6.	III	Doubles (with Mirza Bašić)	Norway	Fredrik Ask / Frederik Sletting-Johnsen	7–6^{(7–3)}, 6–4
▲3–0; 1 April 2009; Avenir Sportif de la Marsa, La Marsa, Tunisia; Europe/Africa round robin; Clay (outdoor)
Victory	7.	III	Doubles (with Mirza Bašić)	Namibia	Jean Erasmus / Jurgens Strydom	6–2, 6–3
▲3–0; 2 April 2009; Avenir Sportif de la Marsa, La Marsa, Tunisia; Europe/Africa round robin; Clay (outdoor)
Victory	8.	III	Doubles (with Mirza Bašić)	Andorra	Hector Hormigo-Herrera / Jordi Vila-Vila	6–3, 6–3
▲2–1; 3 April 2009; Avenir Sportif de la Marsa, La Marsa, Tunisia; Europe/Africa round robin; Clay (outdoor)
Defeat	9.	III	Doubles (with Mirza Bašić)	Norway	Stian Boretti / Erling Tveit	4–6, 3–6
▲3–2; 8–10 July 2011; SKPC Mejdan, Tuzla, Bosnia and Herzegovina; Europe/Africa quarterfinal; Hard (indoor)
Defeat	10.	V	Singles	Estonia	Vladimir Ivanov	5–7, 6–3, 3–6
▲3–1; 10–12 February 2012; Ankara Tenis Kulubu, Ankara, Turkey; Europe/Africa first round; Hard (indoor)
Defeat	11.	II	Singles	Turkey	Marsel İlhan	1–6, 1–6, 3–6
Victory	12.	III	Doubles (with Amer Delić)	Turkey	Marsel İlhan / Ergun Zorlu	4–6, 6–4, 6–3, 7–6^{(7–2)}
▼1–4; 6–8 April 2012; Republic Olympic Training Centre for Tennis, Minsk, Belarus; Europe/Africa second round; Hard (indoor)
Defeat	13.	III	Doubles (with Amer Delić)	Belarus	Aliaksandr Bury / Max Mirnyi	2–6, 6–7^{(2–7)}, 6–7^{(6–8)}
▲4–1; 1–3 February 2013; Mojmilo Sports Hall, Sarajevo, Bosnia and Herzegovina; Europe/Africa first round; Hard (indoor)
Victory	14.	III	Doubles (with Damir Džumhur)	Luxembourg	Mike Scheidweiler / Laurent Bram	6–1, 6–3, 6–3
▼1–3; 5–7 April 2013; Teniski Klub Mostar, Mostar, Bosnia and Herzegovina; Europe/Africa second round; Clay
Defeat	15.	I	Singles	Moldova	Radu Albot	3–6, 6–7^{(3–7)}, 3–6
▲3–1; 31 January – 2 February 2014; Mojmilo Sports Hall, Sarajevo, Bosnia and Herzegovina; Europe/Africa first round; Carpet (indoor)
Victory	16.	III	Doubles (with Mirza Bašić)	Greece	Alexandros Jakupovic / Markos Kalovelonis	5–7, 6–0, 6–4, 7–5
▲3–2; 4–6 April 2014; Tali Tennis Center, Helsinki, Finland; Europe/Africa second round; Hard (indoor)
Defeat	17.	III	Doubles (with Mirza Bašić)	Finland	Henri Kontinen / Jarkko Nieminen	3–6, 6–7^{(4–7)}, 2–6
▼2–3; 12–14 September 2014; Mojmilo Sports Hall, Sarajevo, Bosnia and Herzegovina; Europe/Africa third round; Hard (indoor)
Defeat	18.	III	Doubles (with Mirza Bašić)	Lithuania	Ričardas Berankis / Laurynas Grigelis	3–6, 3–6, 6–7^{(4–7)}
▲4–1; 6–8 March 2015; Harare Sports Club, Harare, Zimbabwe; Europe/Africa first round; Hard (outdoor)
Victory	19.	III	Doubles (with Mirza Bašić)	Zimbabwe	Wayne Black / Mark Fynn	6–3, 3–6, 6–3, 6–4
Victory	20.	IV	Singles	Zimbabwe	Takanyi Garanganga	6–7^{(4–7)}, 7–6^{(7–4)}, 7–5
▼2–3; 17–19 July 2015; Siófok KC, Siófok, Hungary; Europe/Africa second round; Clay (outdoor)
Defeat	21.	I	Singles	Hungary	Márton Fucsovics	2–6, 3–6, 6–3, 6–4, 3–6
Defeat	22.	V	Singles	Hungary	Péter Nagy	4–6, 3–6, 3–6
▲3–1; 4–6 March 2016; Gradska Arena Zenica, Zenica, Bosnia and Herzegovina; Europe/Africa first round; Carpet (indoor)
Defeat	23.	II	Singles	Tunisia	Malek Jaziri	7–6^{(7–5)}, 2–6, 6–7^{(7–9)}, 7–6^{(7–5)}, 4–6
Victory	24.	III	Doubles (with Mirza Bašić)	Tunisia	Malek Jaziri / Skander Mansouri	6–7^{(2–7)}, 4–6, 6–3, 7–5, 6–4
▲3–1; 15–17 July 2016; Javna ustanova za sport, odmor i rekreaciju, Bihać, Bosnia and Herzegovina; Europe/Africa second round; Clay (outdoor)
Victory	25.	III	Doubles (with Mirza Bašić)	Turkey	Marsel İlhan / Cem İlkel	6–2, 6–4, 6–1
▲5–0; 16–18 September 2016; Siemens Arena, Vilnius, Lithuania; Europe/Africa third round; Hard (indoor)
Victory	26.	III	Doubles (with Mirza Bašić)	Lithuania	Laurynas Grigelis / Lukas Mugevičius	6–4, 6–4, 6–2
Victory	27.	IV	Singles	Lithuania	Tadas Babelis	6–4, 3–6, 6–2
