= 2011 Davis Cup Europe Zone Group III =

International tennis competition

The Europe/Africa Zone is one of the three zones of regional Davis Cup competition in 2011.

In the Europe/Africa Zone there were three different tiers, called groups, in which teams competed against each other to advance to the upper tier. Group III was divided into a European zone and an African zone. The Group III Europe tournament was held in Tennis Club JUG, Skopje, North Macedonia, May 11–14, on outdoor clay courts.

== Format ==
The twelve teams were split into four pools. The winner of a pool played against another group winner to decide which team gets promoted to the Europe/Africa Zone Group II for 2012.

== Group stage ==
=== Group A ===
Team	Pld	W	L	MF	MA	Pts
Macedonia	2	2	0	5	1	2
Andorra	2	1	1	3	3	1
San Marino	2	0	2	1	5	0

==== Macedonia vs. San Marino ====
Macedonia
3
Tennis Club Jug-Skopje, Skopje, Macedonia
11 May 2011
Clay

San Marino
0

			1	2	3
1	(North Macedonia) (San Marino)	Predrag Rusevski; Giacomo Zonzini	6; 0	6; 0
2	(North Macedonia) (San Marino)	Tomislav Jotovski; Alberto Brighi	6; 1	6; 0
3	(North Macedonia) (San Marino)	Lazar Magdinčev / Predrag Rusevski; Alberto Brighi / Giacomo Zonzini	6; 4	6; 1

==== Andorra vs. San Marino ====
Andorra
2
Tennis Club Jug-Skopje, Skopje, Macedonia
12 May 2011
Clay

San Marino
1

			1	2	3
1	(Andorra) (San Marino)	Damien Gelabert; Giacomo Zonzini	4; 6	1; 6
2	(Andorra) (San Marino)	Jean-Baptiste Poux-Gautier; Marco De Rossi	6; 1	6; 0
3	(Andorra) (San Marino)	Damien Gelabert / Jean-Baptiste Poux-Gautier; Alberto Brighi / Giacomo Zonzini	6; 1	6; 1

==== Macedonia vs. Andorra ====
Macedonia
2
Tennis Club Jug-Skopje, Skopje, Macedonia
13 May 2011
Clay

Andorra
1

			1	2	3
1	(North Macedonia) (Andorra)	Dimitar Grabuloski; Damien Gelabert	6; 1	6; 2
2	(North Macedonia) (Andorra)	Tomislav Jotovski; Jean-Baptiste Poux-Gautier	4; 6	2; 6
3	(North Macedonia) (Andorra)	Lazar Magdinčev / Predrag Rusevski; Damien Gelabert / Jean-Baptiste Poux-Gautier	6; 3	6; 4

=== Group B ===
Team	Pld	W	L	MF	MA	Pts
Turkey	2	2	0	5	1	2
Norway	2	1	1	4	2	1
Albania	2	0	2	0	6	0

==== Turkey vs. Albania ====
Turkey
3
Tennis Club Jug-Skopje, Skopje, Macedonia
11 May 2011
Clay

Albania
0

			1	2	3
1	(Turkey) (Albania)	Ergün Zorlu; Flavio Deçe	6; 0	6; 0
2	(Turkey) (Albania)	Marsel İlhan; Ivo Spathari	6; 0	6; 0
3	(Turkey) (Albania)	Haluk Akkoyun / Tuna Altuna; Ferat Istrefi / Ivo Spathari	6; 1	6; 1

==== Norway vs. Albania ====
Norway
3
Tennis Club Jug-Skopje, Skopje, Macedonia
12 May 2011
Clay

Albania
0

			1	2	3
1	(Norway) (Albania)	Stian Boretti; Flavio Deçe	6; 0	6; 1
2	(Norway) (Albania)	Erling Tveit; Ivo Spathari	6; 0	6; 0
3	(Norway) (Albania)	Stian Boretti / Erling Tveit; Flavio Deçe / Ferat Istrefi	6; 2	6; 2

==== Turkey vs. Norway ====
Turkey
2
Tennis Club Jug-Skopje, Skopje, Macedonia
13 May 2011
Clay

Norway
1

			1	2	3
1	(Turkey) (Norway)	Haluk Akkoyun; Stian Boretti	4; 6	3; 6
2	(Turkey) (Norway)	Marsel İlhan; Erling Tveit	6; 1	6; 1
3	(Turkey) (Norway)	Ergün Zorlu / Marsel İlhan; Stian Boretti / Erling Tveit	6; 4	2; 6	7; 6

=== Group C ===
Team	Pld	W	L	MF	MA	Pts
Montenegro	2	2	0	5	1	2
Armenia	2	1	1	3	3	1
Georgia	2	0	2	1	5	0

==== Montenegro vs. Georgia ====
Montenegro
3
Tennis Club Jug-Skopje, Skopje, Macedonia
11 May 2011
Clay

Georgia
0

			1	2	3
1	(Montenegro) (Georgia (country))	Ljubomir Čelebić; George Tsivadze	6; 3	7; 6
2	(Montenegro) (Georgia (country))	Goran Tošić; Aleksandre Metreveli	6; 2	6; 0
3	(Montenegro) (Georgia (country))	Ljubomir Čelebić / Goran Tošić; Aleksandre Metreveli / George Tsivadze	7; 5	6; 0

==== Armenia vs. Georgia ====
Armenia
2
Tennis Club Jug-Skopje, Skopje, Macedonia
12 May 2011
Clay

Georgia
1

			1	2	3
1	(Armenia) (Georgia (country))	Daniil Proskura; George Tsivadze	6; 4	0; 6	6; 3
2	(Armenia) (Georgia (country))	Khachatur Khachatryan; Aleksandre Metreveli	2; 6	0; 6
3	(Armenia) (Georgia (country))	Khachatur Khachatryan / Daniil Proskura; Aleksandre Metreveli / George Tsivadze	6; 3	6; 1

==== Montenegro vs. Armenia ====
Montenegro
2
Tennis Club Jug-Skopje, Skopje, Macedonia
13 May 2011
Clay

Armenia
1

			1	2	3
1	(Montenegro) (Armenia)	Ljubomir Čelebić; Daniil Proskura	6; 7	2; 6
2	(Montenegro) (Armenia)	Goran Tošić; Khachatur Khachatryan	6; 0	6; 0
3	(Montenegro) (Armenia)	Ljubomir Čelebić / Goran Tošić; Khachatur Khachatryan / Daniil Proskura	6; 2	6; 2

=== Group D ===
Team	Pld	W	L	MF	MA	Pts
Moldova	2	2	0	6	0	2
Iceland	2	1	1	2	4	1
Malta	2	0	2	1	5	0

==== Moldova vs. Malta ====
Moldova
3
Tennis Club Jug-Skopje, Skopje, Macedonia
11 May 2011
Clay

Malta
0

			1	2	3
1	(Moldova) (Malta)	Andrei Gorban; Denzil Agius	6; 0	6; 0
2	(Moldova) (Malta)	Radu Albot; Matthew Asciak	7; 5	6; 2
3	(Moldova) (Malta)	Andrei Gorban / Roman Tudoreanu; Matthew Asciak / Bradley Callus	6; 1	6; 0

==== Iceland vs. Malta ====
Iceland
2
Tennis Club Jug-Skopje, Skopje, Macedonia
12 May 2011
Clay

Malta
1

			1	2	3
1	(Iceland) (Malta)	Arnar Sigurðsson; Bradley Callus	6; 1	6; 1
2	(Iceland) (Malta)	Andri Jonsson; Matthew Asciak	2; 6	1; 6
3	(Iceland) (Malta)	Andri Jonsson / Arnar Sigurðsson; Matthew Asciak / Mark Gatt	7; 6	6; 4

==== Moldova vs. Iceland ====
Moldova
3
Tennis Club Jug-Skopje, Skopje, Macedonia
13 May 2011
Clay

Iceland
0

			1	2	3
1	(Moldova) (Iceland)	Andrei Gorban; Leifur Sigurðarson	6; 0	6; 4
2	(Moldova) (Iceland)	Radu Albot; Birkir Gunnarsson	6; 0	6; 0
3	(Moldova) (Iceland)	Radu Albot / Andrei Gorban; Andri Jonsson / Jón Axel Jónsson	6; 2	6; 2

== Playoffs ==
=== 9th to 12th Playoffs ===
==== Malta vs. Georgia ====
Malta
0
Tennis Club Jug-Skopje, Skopje, Macedonia
14 May 2011
Clay

Georgia
3

			1	2	3
1	(Malta) (Georgia (country))	Denzil Agius; George Tsivadze	2; 6	0; 6
2	(Malta) (Georgia (country))	Mark Gatt; Aleksandre Metreveli	1; 6	0; 6
3	(Malta) (Georgia (country))	Denzil Agius / Mark Gatt; Aleksandre Metreveli / Nika Dolidze	0; 6	3; 6

==== Albania vs. San Marino ====
Albania
1
Tennis Club Jug-Skopje, Skopje, Macedonia
14 May 2011
Clay

San Marino
2

			1	2	3
1	(Albania) (San Marino)	Flavio Deçe; Diego Zonzini	7; 5	3; 6	6; 7
2	(Albania) (San Marino)	Ferat Istrefi; Alberto Brighi	7; 6	6; 4
3	(Albania) (San Marino)	Flavio Deçe / Ferat Istrefi; Marco De Rossi / Diego Zonzini	4; 6	3; 6

=== 5th to 8th Playoffs ===
==== Norway vs. Andorra ====
Norway
3
Tennis Club Jug-Skopje, Skopje, Macedonia
14 May 2011
Clay

Andorra
0

			1	2	3
1	(Norway) (Andorra)	Stian Boretti; Gerard Blasi-Font	6; 0	6; 1
2	(Norway) (Andorra)	Erling Tveit; Jean-Baptiste Poux-Gautier	7; 6	6; 3
3	(Norway) (Andorra)	Joachim Bjerke / Oystein Steiro; Damien Gelabert / Jean-Baptiste Poux-Gautier	6; 1	6; 4

==== Iceland vs. Armenia ====
Iceland
1
Tennis Club Jug-Skopje, Skopje, Macedonia
14 May 2011
Clay

Armenia
2

			1	2	3
1	(Iceland) (Armenia)	Jón Axel Jónsson; Daniil Proskura	1; 6	0; 6
2	(Iceland) (Armenia)	Arnar Sigurðsson; Torgom Asatryan	6; 0	6; 4
3	(Iceland) (Armenia)	Andri Jonsson / Arnar Sigurðsson; Khachatur Khachatryan / Daniil Proskura	6; 2	3; 6	1; 6

=== Promotion Playoffs ===
==== Macedonia vs. Turkey ====
Macedonia
0
Tennis Club Jug-Skopje, Skopje, Macedonia
14 May 2011
Clay

Turkey
2

			1	2	3
1	(North Macedonia) (Turkey)	Predrag Rusevski; Ergün Zorlu	6; 3	2; 6	2; 6
2	(North Macedonia) (Turkey)	Tomislav Jotovski; Marsel İlhan	1; 6	1; 6
3	(North Macedonia) (Turkey)	Lazar Magdinčev / Predrag Rusevski; Haluk Akkoyun / Tuna Altuna				not played

==== Moldova vs. Montenegro ====
Moldova
2
Tennis Club Jug-Skopje, Skopje, Macedonia
14 May 2011
Clay

Montenegro
1

			1	2	3
1	(Moldova) (Montenegro)	Andrei Gorban; Ljubomir Čelebić	6; 2	6; 3
2	(Moldova) (Montenegro)	Radu Albot; Goran Tošić	6; 3	7; 6
3	(Moldova) (Montenegro)	Radu Albot / Andrei Gorban; Ljubomir Čelebić / Goran Tošić				w/o

== Final standings ==
Rank	Team
1	Moldova
1	Turkey
3	Montenegro
3	North Macedonia
5	Armenia
5	Norway
7	Andorra
7	Iceland
9	Georgia
9	San Marino
11	Albania
11	Malta

- Moldova and Turkey were promoted to Europe/Africa Zone Group II in 2012.
