= 2009 Davis Cup Europe/Africa Zone Group III =

International tennis competition

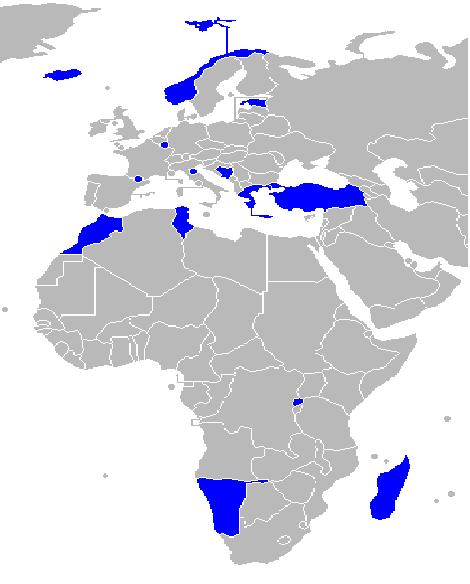
Countries participating in the 2009 Davis Cup Europe/Africa Zone Group III

The European and African Zone is one of the three zones of regional Davis Cup competition in 2009.

In the European and African Zone there are four different groups in which teams compete against each other to advance to the next group.

== Format ==
The sixteen teams will be divided into two sections, Section A and Section B. There will be a round robin with eight teams in each section. The eight nations will be divided into two pools of four. The top two teams in each pool will advance to the Final Pool of four teams from which the two highest-placed nations are promoted to Europe and Africa Group II in 2010. The bottom two teams of each pool of the two round robins will compete against each other in the Relegation Pool. The two lowest-placed nations are relegated to Europe and Africa Group IV in 2010.

== Information ==
Section A:

Venue: Tenis Eskrim Daghcilik Spor Kulübü, Istanbul, Turkey

Surface: Hard – outdoors

Dates: 23 April – 3 May

Section B:

Venue: Avenir Sportif de la Marsa, Tunis, Tunisia

Surface: Clay – outdoors

Dates: 1–5 April

== Participating teams ==
Section A

- Botswana
- Estonia
- Greece
- Iceland
- Luxembourg
- Madagascar
- Rwanda
- Turkey

Section B

- Andorra
- Bosnia and Herzegovina
- Morocco
- Namibia
- Nigeria
- Norway
- San Marino
- Tunisia

== Section A ==
=== Group A ===
		(Estonia)	(Luxembourg)	(Iceland)	(Botswana)
1	Estonia (3–0)		3–0	3–0	3–0
2	Luxembourg (2–1)	0–3		3–0	3–0
3	Iceland (1–2)	0–3	0–3		2–1
4	Botswana (0–3)	0–3	0–3	1–2	

==== Iceland vs. Luxembourg ====
Iceland
0
Tenis Eskrim Daghcilik Spor Kulübü, Istanbul, Turkey
29 April 2009
hard(outdoors)

Luxembourg
3

			1	2	3
1	(Iceland) (Luxembourg)	Arnar Sigurðsson; Gilles Kremer	6; 2	6^{5} 7^{7}	3; 6
2	(Iceland) (Luxembourg)	Birkir Gunnarsson; Mike Scheidweiler	0; 6	0; 6
3	(Iceland) (Luxembourg)	Magnús Gunnarsson / Teitur Marshall; Gilles Kremer / Mike Scheidweiler	1; 6	1; 6

==== Botswana vs. Estonia ====
Botswana
0
Tenis Eskrim Daghcilik Spor Kulübü, Istanbul, Turkey
29 April 2009
hard(outdoors)

Estonia
3

			1	2	3
1	(Botswana) (Estonia)	Matshidiso Malope; Jaak Põldma	0; 6	0; 6
2	(Botswana) (Estonia)	Thabiso Mabaka; Jürgen Zopp	0; 6	0; 6
3	(Botswana) (Estonia)	Shingirai Muzondiwa / Lefa Ashley Sibanda; Jürgen Zopp / Mait Künnap	1; 6	1; 6

==== Botswana vs. Luxembourg ====
Botswana
0
Tenis Eskrim Daghcilik Spor Kulübü, Istanbul, Turkey
30 April 2009
hard(outdoors)

Luxembourg
3

			1	2	3
1	(Botswana) (Luxembourg)	Lefa Ashley Sibanda; Laurent Bram	0; 6	1; 6
2	(Botswana) (Luxembourg)	Thabiso Mabaka; Mike Scheidweiler	0; 6	1; 6
3	(Botswana) (Luxembourg)	Shingirai Muzondiwa / Matshidiso Malope; Philippe Grandjean / Laurent Bram	2; 6	1; 6

==== Iceland vs. Estonia ====
Iceland
0
Tenis Eskrim Daghcilik Spor Kulübü, Istanbul, Turkey
30 April 2009
hard(outdoors)

Estonia
3

			1	2	3
1	(Iceland) (Estonia)	Magnús Gunnarsson; Jaak Põldma	0; 6	0; 6
2	(Iceland) (Estonia)	Teitur Marshall; Jürgen Zopp	2; 6	1; 6
3	(Iceland) (Estonia)	Arnar Sigurðsson / Magnús Gunnarsson; Vladimir Ivanov / Mait Künnap	1; 6	4; 6

==== Estonia vs. Luxembourg ====
Estonia
3
Tenis Eskrim Daghcilik Spor Kulübü, Istanbul, Turkey
1 May 2009
hard(outdoors)

Luxembourg
0

			1	2	3
1	(Estonia) (Luxembourg)	Jaak Põldma; Gilles Kremer	7^{8} 6^{6}	6; 2
2	(Estonia) (Luxembourg)	Jürgen Zopp; Mike Scheidweiler	4; 6	6; 3	7^{7} 6^{2}
3	(Estonia) (Luxembourg)	Mait Künnap / Jürgen Zopp; Gilles Kremer / Mike Scheidweiler	6; 4	6; 3

==== Botswana vs. Iceland ====
Botswana
1
Tenis Eskrim Daghcilik Spor Kulübü, Istanbul, Turkey
1 May 2009
hard (outdoors)

Iceland
2

			1	2	3
1	(Botswana) (Iceland)	Matshidiso Malope; Arnar Sigurðsson	0; 6	0; 6
2	(Botswana) (Iceland)	Thabiso Mabaka; Teitur Marshall	6; 2	6; 1
3	(Botswana) (Iceland)	Thabiso Mabaka / Matshidiso Malope; Magnús Gunnarsson / Arnar Sigurðsson	4; 6	3; 6

=== Group B ===
		(Turkey)	(Greece)	(Madagascar)	(Rwanda)
1	Turkey (3–0)		2–1	2–1	3–0
2	Greece (2–1)	1–2		3–0	3–0
3	Madagascar (0–2)	1–2	0–3		NP
4	Rwanda (0–2)	0–3	0–3	NP	

==== Turkey vs. Greece ====
Turkey
2
Tenis Eskrim Daghcilik Spor Kulübü, Istanbul, Turkey
29 April 2009 & 30 April 2009
hard(outdoors)

Greece
1

			1	2	3
1	(Turkey) (Greece)	Haluk Akkoyun; Konstantinos Economidis	7^{7} 6^{4}	6; 0
2	(Turkey) (Greece)	Marsel İlhan; Alexander Jakupovic	6; 4	6; 2
3	(Turkey) (Greece)	Barış Ergüden / Ergün Zorlu; Alexander Jakupovic / Dimitris Kleftakos	3; 6	6; 3	3; 6

==== Rwanda vs. Madagascar ====
Rwanda

Tenis Eskrim Daghcilik Spor Kulübü, Istanbul, Turkey
29 April 2009
hard(outdoors)

Madagascar

		1	2	3
1	(Rwanda) (Madagascar)
2	(Rwanda) (Madagascar)
3	(Rwanda) (Madagascar)

Madagascar defeated Rwanda by walkover.

==== Turkey vs. Rwanda ====
Turkey
3
Tenis Eskrim Daghcilik Spor Kulübü, Istanbul, Turkey
30 April 2009
hard(outdoors)

Rwanda
0

			1	2	3
1	(Turkey) (Rwanda)	Haluk Akkoyun; Dieu-Donne Habiyambere	6; 0	6; 1
2	(Turkey) (Rwanda)	Marsel İlhan; Olivier Nkunda	6; 1	6; 0
3	(Turkey) (Rwanda)	Barış Ergüden / Ergün Zorlu; Dieu-Donne Habiyambere / Olivier Nkunda	6; 0	6; 1

==== Madagascar vs. Greece ====
Madagascar
0
Tenis Eskrim Daghcilik Spor Kulübü, Istanbul, Turkey
30 April 2009
hard(outdoors)

Greece
3

			1	2	3
1	(Madagascar) (Greece)	Jacob Rasolondrazana; Konstantinos Economidis	3; 6	3; 6
2	(Madagascar) (Greece)	Tony Rajaobelina; Alexander Jakupovic	2; 6	3; 6
3	(Madagascar) (Greece)	Erick Counil / Thierry Rajaobelina; Alexander Jakupovic / Dimitris Kleftakos	3; 6	6; 4	3; 6

==== Rwanda vs. Greece ====
Rwanda
0
Tenis Eskrim Daghcilik Spor Kulübü, Istanbul, Turkey
1 May 2009
hard(outdoors)

Greece
3

			1	2	3
1	(Rwanda) (Greece)	Dieu-Donne Habiyambere; Konstantinos Economidis	1; 6	1; 6
2	(Rwanda) (Greece)	Olivier Nkunda; Alexander Jakupovic	1; 6	1; 6
3	(Rwanda) (Greece)	Dieu-Donne Habiyambere / Olivier Nkunda; Alexander Jakupovic / Dimitris Kleftakos	0; 6	0; 6

==== Turkey vs. Madagascar ====
Turkey
2
Tenis Eskrim Daghcilik Spor Kulübü, Istanbul, Turkey
1 May 2009
hard(outdoors)

Madagascar
1

			1	2	3
1	(Turkey) (Madagascar)	Haluk Akkoyun; Erick Counil	3; 6	2; 6
2	(Turkey) (Madagascar)	Marsel İlhan; Jacob Rasolondrazana	7^{7} 6^{1}	6; 3
3	(Turkey) (Madagascar)	Barış Ergüden / Ergün Zorlu; Tony Rajaobelina / Thierry Rajaobelina	6; 2	6; 4

=== Promotion Pool ===
The top two teams from each of Pools A and B advanced to the Promotion pool. Results and points from games against the opponent from the preliminary round were carried forward.

(scores in italics carried over from Groups)

		(Estonia)	(Turkey)	(Luxembourg)	(Greece)
1	Estonia (3–0)		2–1	3–0	3–0
2	Turkey (2–1)	1–2		2–0	2–1
3	Luxembourg (1–2)	0–3	0–2		2–1
4	Greece (0–3)	0–3	1–2	1–2	

==== Turkey vs. Estonia ====
Turkey
1
Tenis Eskrim Daghcilik Spor Kulübü, Istanbul, Turkey
2 May 2009
hard(outdoors)

Estonia
2

			1	2	3
1	(Turkey) (Estonia)	Haluk Akkoyun; Jaak Põldma	1; 6	6^{4} 7^{7}
2	(Turkey) (Estonia)	Marsel İlhan; Jürgen Zopp	6; 4	6; 4
3	(Turkey) (Estonia)	Marsel İlhan / Ergün Zorlu; Mait Künnap / Jürgen Zopp	1; 6	2; 6

==== Luxembourg vs. Greece ====
Luxembourg
2
Tenis Eskrim Daghcilik Spor Kulübü, Istanbul, Turkey
2 May 2009
hard(outdoors)

Greece
1

			1	2	3
1	(Luxembourg) (Greece)	Gilles Kremer; Dimitris Kleftakos	4; 6	6; 1	1; 6
2	(Luxembourg) (Greece)	Mike Scheidweiler; Alexander Jakupovic	5; 7	6; 3	7^{7} 6^{4}
3	(Luxembourg) (Greece)	Gilles Kremer / Mike Scheidweiler; Alexander Jakupovic / Dimitris Kleftakos	4; 6	6; 2	6; 3

==== Turkey vs. Luxembourg ====
Turkey
2
Tenis Eskrim Daghcilik Spor Kulübü, Istanbul, Turkey
3 May 2009
hard(outdoors)

Luxembourg
0

			1	2	3
1	(Turkey) (Luxembourg)	Haluk Akkoyun; Gilles Kremer	7^{7} 6^{2}	6; 1
2	(Turkey) (Luxembourg)	Marsel İlhan; Mike Scheidweiler	6^{6} 7^{8}	6; 4	6; 4
3	(Turkey) (Luxembourg)	Barış Ergüden / Ergün Zorlu; Gilles Kremer / Mike Scheidweiler				not played

==== Greece vs. Estonia ====
Greece
0
Tenis Eskrim Daghcilik Spor Kulübü, Istanbul, Turkey
3 May 2009
hard(outdoors)

Estonia
3

			1	2	3
1	(Greece) (Estonia)	Dimitris Kleftakos; Jaak Põldma	0; 3			retired
2	(Greece) (Estonia)	Alexander Jakupovic; Jürgen Zopp	0; 5			retired
3	(Greece) (Estonia)	Alexander Jakupovic / Dimitris Kleftakos; Mait Künnap / Jürgen Zopp				w/o

=== Relegation Pool ===
The bottom two teams from Pools A and B were placed in the relegation group. Results and points from games against the opponent from the preliminary round were carried forward.

(scores in italics carried over from Groups)

		(Madagascar)	(Iceland)	(Rwanda)	(Botswana)
1	Madagascar (2–0)		2–1	NP	3–0
2	Iceland (2–1)	1–2		2–1	2–1
3	Rwanda (1–1)	NP	1–2		2–1
4	Botswana (0–3)	0–3	1–2	1–2	

==== Iceland vs. Madagascar ====
Iceland
1
Tenis Eskrim Daghcilik Spor Kulübü, Istanbul, Turkey
2–3 May 2009
hard(outdoors)

Madagascar
2

			1	2	3
1	(Iceland) (Madagascar)	Arnar Sigurðsson; Thierry Rajaobelina	6; 1	6; 3
2	(Iceland) (Madagascar)	Birkir Gunnarsson; Jacob Rasolondrazana	1; 6	1; 6
3	(Iceland) (Madagascar)	Magnús Gunnarsson / Arnar Sigurðsson; Erick Counil / Jacob Rasolondrazana	4; 6	3; 6

==== Botswana vs. Rwanda ====
Botswana
1
Tenis Eskrim Daghcilik Spor Kulübü, Istanbul, Turkey
2 May 2009
hard(outdoors)

Rwanda
2

			1	2	3
1	(Botswana) (Rwanda)	Lefa Ashley Sibanda; Dieu-Donne Habiyambere	1; 6	6; 3	5; 7
2	(Botswana) (Rwanda)	Thabiso Mabaka; Olivier Nkunda	7; 5	6; 2
3	(Botswana) (Rwanda)	Matshidiso Malope / Shingirai Muzondiwa; Dieu-Donne Habiyambere / Olivier Nkunda	3; 6	7; 5	3; 6

==== Botswana vs. Madagascar ====
Botswana
0
Tenis Eskrim Daghcilik Spor Kulübü, Istanbul, Turkey
3 May 2009
hard(outdoors)

Madagascar
3

			1	2	3
1	(Botswana) (Madagascar)	Lefa Ashley Sibanda; Thierry Rajaobelina	2; 6	1; 6
2	(Botswana) (Madagascar)	Thabiso Mabaka; Jacob Rasolondrazana	1; 6	4; 6
3	(Botswana) (Madagascar)	Matshidiso Malope / Shingirai Muzondiwa; Erick Counil / Jacob Rasolondrazana	0; 6	1; 6

==== Rwanda vs. Iceland ====
Rwanda
1
Tenis Eskrim Daghcilik Spor Kulübü, Istanbul, Turkey
3 May 2009
hard(outdoors)

Iceland
2

			1	2	3
1	(Rwanda) (Iceland)	Dieu-Donne Habiyambere; Arnar Sigurðsson	0; 6	0; 6
2	(Rwanda) (Iceland)	Olivier Nkunda; Birkir Gunnarsson	6; 2	1; 6	7; 5
3	(Rwanda) (Iceland)	Dieu-Donne Habiyambere / Mathieu Uwizeyimana; Magnús Gunnarsson / Arnar Sigurðsson	1; 6	1; 6

== Section B ==
=== Group A ===
		(Morocco)	(Tunisia)	(Nigeria)	(San Marino)
1	Morocco (3–0)		2–1	3–0	3–0
2	Tunisia (2–1)	1–2		3–0	3–0
3	Nigeria (1–2)	0–3	0–3		3–0
4	San Marino (0–3)	0–3	0–3	0–3	

==== San Marino vs. Morocco ====
San Marino
0
Avenir Sportif de la Marsa, Tunis, Tunisia
1 April 2009
clay (outdoors)

Morocco
3

			1	2	3
1	(San Marino) (Morocco)	Alberto Brighi; Reda El Amrani	1; 6	0; 6
2	(San Marino) (Morocco)	Giacomo Zonzini; Rabie Chaki	4; 6	2; 6
3	(San Marino) (Morocco)	Domenico Vicini / Giacomo Zonzini; Talal Ouahabi / Mehdi Ziadi	3; 6	2; 6

==== Tunisia vs. Nigeria ====
Tunisia
3
Avenir Sportif de la Marsa, Tunis, Tunisia
1 April 2009
clay (outdoors)

Nigeria
0

			1	2	3
1	(Tunisia) (Nigeria)	Haithem Abid; Lawal Shehu	6; 1	6; 1
2	(Tunisia) (Nigeria)	Malek Jaziri; Abdul-Mumin Babalola	6; 2	6; 0
3	(Tunisia) (Nigeria)	Haithem Abid / Malek Jaziri; Abdul-Mumin Babalola / Lawal Shehu	6; 4	6; 1

==== Nigeria vs. Morocco ====
Nigeria
0
Avenir Sportif de la Marsa, Tunis, Tunisia
2 April 2009
clay (outdoors)

Morocco
3

			1	2	3
1	(Nigeria) (Morocco)	Candy Idoko; Rabie Chaki	1; 6	2; 6
2	(Nigeria) (Morocco)	Sunday Emmanuel; Talal Ouahabi	2; 6	3; 6
3	(Nigeria) (Morocco)	Abdul-Mumin Babalola / Lawal Shehu; Reda El Amrani / Mehdi Ziadi	3; 6	2; 6

==== Tunisia vs. San Marino ====
Tunisia
3
Avenir Sportif de la Marsa, Tunis, Tunisia
2 April 2009
clay (outdoors)

San Marino
0

			1	2	3
1	(Tunisia) (San Marino)	Haithem Abid; Giacomo Zonzini	6; 0	6; 0
2	(Tunisia) (San Marino)	Malek Jaziri; Diego Zonzini	6; 2	6; 1
3	(Tunisia) (San Marino)	Haithem Abid / Malek Jaziri; Domenico Vicini / Diego Zonzini	6; 1	6; 2

==== Tunisia vs. Morocco ====
Tunisia
1
Avenir Sportif de la Marsa, Tunis, Tunisia
3 April 2009
clay (outdoors)

Morocco
2

			1	2	3
1	(Tunisia) (Morocco)	Haithem Abid; Reda El Amrani	6; 3	6; 3
2	(Tunisia) (Morocco)	Malek Jaziri; Rabie Chaki	3; 6	5; 7
3	(Tunisia) (Morocco)	Anis Ghorbel / Malek Jaziri; Rabie Chaki / Mehdi Ziadi	1; 6	1; 6

==== San Marino vs. Nigeria ====
San Marino
0
Avenir Sportif de la Marsa, Tunis, Tunisia
3 April 2009
clay (outdoors)

Nigeria
3

			1	2	3
1	(San Marino) (Nigeria)	Domenico Vicini; Abdul-Mumin Babalola	1; 6	4; 6
2	(San Marino) (Nigeria)	Diego Zonzini; Sunday Emmanuel	7; 5	2; 6	0; 6
3	(San Marino) (Nigeria)	Domenico Vicini / Diego Zonzini; Candy Idoko / Lawal Shehu	6^{0} 7^{7}	5; 7

=== Group B ===
		(Norway)	(Bosnia and Herzegovina)	(Andorra)	(Namibia)
1	Norway (3–0)		2–1	3–0	3–0
2	Bosnia and Herzegovina (2–1)	1–2		3–0	3–0
3	Andorra (1–2)	0–3	0–3		2–1
4	Namibia (0–3)	0–3	0–3	1–2	

==== Andorra vs. Norway ====
Andorra
0
Avenir Sportif de la Marsa, Tunis, Tunisia
1 April 2009
clay (outdoors)

Norway
3

			1	2	3
1	(Andorra) (Norway)	Hector Hormigo-Herrera; Erling Tveit	1; 6	1; 6
2	(Andorra) (Norway)	Jean-Baptiste Poux-Gautier; Stian Boretti	2; 6	3; 6
3	(Andorra) (Norway)	Pau Gerbaud-Farras / Jordi Vila-Vila; Stian Boretti / Erling Tveit	2; 6	2; 6

==== Namibia vs. Bosnia and Herzegovina ====
Namibia
0
Avenir Sportif de la Marsa, Tunis, Tunisia
1 April 2009
clay (outdoors)

Bosnia and Herzegovina
3

			1	2	3
1	(Namibia) (Bosnia and Herzegovina)	Jean Erasmus; Ismar Gorčić	1; 6	1; 6
2	(Namibia) (Bosnia and Herzegovina)	Jurgens Strydom; Aldin Šetkić	0; 6	2; 6
3	(Namibia) (Bosnia and Herzegovina)	Jean Erasmus / Jurgens Strydom; Mirza Bašić / Tomislav Brkić	2; 6	3; 6

==== Namibia vs. Norway ====
Namibia
0
Avenir Sportif de la Marsa, Tunis, Tunisia
2 April 2009
clay (outdoors)

Norway
3

			1	2	3
1	(Namibia) (Norway)	Jean Erasmus; Erling Tveit	2; 6	0; 6
2	(Namibia) (Norway)	Jurgens Strydom; Stian Boretti	0; 6	7^{7} 6^{5}	3; 6
3	(Namibia) (Norway)	Jean Erasmus / Warren Frewer; Stian Boretti / Erling Tveit	1; 6	1; 6

==== Andorra vs. Bosnia and Herzegovina ====
Andorra
0
Avenir Sportif de la Marsa, Tunis, Tunisia
2 April 2009
clay (outdoors)

Bosnia and Herzegovina
3

			1	2	3
1	(Andorra) (Bosnia and Herzegovina)	Hector Hormigo-Herrera; Ismar Gorčić	2; 6	1; 6
2	(Andorra) (Bosnia and Herzegovina)	Pau Gerbaud-Farras; Aldin Šetkić	1; 6	0; 6
3	(Andorra) (Bosnia and Herzegovina)	Hector Hormigo-Herrera / Jordi Vila-Vila; Mirza Bašić / Tomislav Brkić	3; 6	3; 6

==== Andorra vs. Namibia ====
Andorra
2
Avenir Sportif de la Marsa, Tunis, Tunisia
3 April 2009
clay (outdoors)

Namibia
1

			1	2	3
1	(Andorra) (Namibia)	Jordi Vila-Vila; Jean Erasmus	6; 1	4; 6	7^{7} 6^{5}
2	(Andorra) (Namibia)	Jean-Baptiste Poux-Gautier; Jurgens Strydom	4; 6	6; 3	6; 1
3	(Andorra) (Namibia)	Hector Hormigo-Herrera / Pau Gerbaud-Farras; Jean Erasmus / Jurgens Strydom	3; 6	3; 6

==== Bosnia and Herzegovina vs. Norway ====
Bosnia and Herzegovina
2
Avenir Sportif de la Marsa, Tunis, Tunisia
3 April 2009
clay (outdoors)

Norway
1

			1	2	3
1	(Bosnia and Herzegovina) (Norway)	Ismar Gorčić; Erling Tveit	6; 2	4; 6	7; 5
2	(Bosnia and Herzegovina) (Norway)	Aldin Šetkić; Stian Boretti	6; 3	7; 5
3	(Bosnia and Herzegovina) (Norway)	Mirza Bašić / Tomislav Brkić; Stian Boretti / Erling Tveit	4; 6	3; 6

=== Promotion play-off Group (1st to 4th) ===
The top two teams from each of Pools A and B advanced to the Promotion pool. Results and points from games against the opponent from the preliminary round were carried forward.

(scores in italics carried over from Groups)

		(Norway)	(Bosnia and Herzegovina)	(Morocco)	(Tunisia)
1	Norway (2–1)		1–2	2–1	2–1
2	Bosnia and Herzegovina (2–1)	2–1		1–2	2–1
3	Morocco (2–1)	1–2	2–1		2–1
4	Tunisia (0–3)	1–2	1–2	1–2	

==== Bosnia and Herzegovina vs. Morocco ====
Bosnia and Herzegovina
1
Avenir Sportif de la Marsa, Tunis, Tunisia
4 April 2009
clay (outdoors)

Morocco
2

			1	2	3
1	(Bosnia and Herzegovina) (Morocco)	Ismar Gorčić; Rabie Chaki	5; 7	4; 6
2	(Bosnia and Herzegovina) (Morocco)	Aldin Šetkić; Talal Ouahabi	5; 7	5; 7
3	(Bosnia and Herzegovina) (Morocco)	Ismar Gorčić / Aldin Šetkić; Rabie Chaki / Mehdi Ziadi	6; 2	6; 2

==== Tunisia vs. Norway ====
Tunisia
1
Avenir Sportif de la Marsa, Tunis, Tunisia
4 April 2009
clay (outdoors)

Norway
2

			1	2	3
1	(Tunisia) (Norway)	Ouassim Derbal; Erling Tveit	2; 6	1; 6
2	(Tunisia) (Norway)	Malek Jaziri; Stian Boretti	7^{7} 6^{1}	6; 2
3	(Tunisia) (Norway)	Ouassim Derbal / Malek Jaziri; Erling Tveit / Stian Boretti	5; 7	5; 7

==== Norway vs. Morocco ====
Norway
2
Avenir Sportif de la Marsa, Tunis, Tunisia
5 April 2009
clay (outdoors)

Morocco
1

			1	2	3
1	(Norway) (Morocco)	Erling Tveit; Rabie Chaki	6; 1	2; 6	6; 1
2	(Norway) (Morocco)	Stian Boretti; Talal Ouahabi	6; 1	6; 0
3	(Norway) (Morocco)	Erling Tveit / Stian Boretti; Rabie Chaki / Mehdi Ziadi	7^{7} 6^{4}	2; 6	6^{2} 7^{7}

==== Tunisia vs. Bosnia and Herzegovina ====
Tunisia
1
Avenir Sportif de la Marsa, Tunis, Tunisia
5 April 2009
clay (outdoors)

Bosnia and Herzegovina
2

			1	2	3
1	(Tunisia) (Bosnia and Herzegovina)	Ouassim Derbal; Ismar Gorčić	1; 6	6^{5} 7^{7}
2	(Tunisia) (Bosnia and Herzegovina)	Malek Jaziri; Aldin Šetkić	4; 6	6; 2	7; 5
3	(Tunisia) (Bosnia and Herzegovina)	Ouassim Derbal / Malek Jaziri; Ismar Gorčić / Aldin Šetkić	6^{4} 7^{7}	1; 6

=== Relegation play-off Group(5th to 8th) ===
The bottom two teams from Pools A and B were placed in the relegation group. Results and points from games against the opponent from the preliminary round were carried forward.

(scores in italics carried over from Groups)

		(Andorra)	(Nigeria)	(Namibia)	(San Marino)
1	Andorra (3–0)		3–0	2–1	2–1
2	Nigeria (2–1)	0–3		2–1	3–0
3	Namibia (1–2)	1–2	1–2		2–1
4	San Marino (0–3)	1–2	0–3	1–2	

==== Andorra vs. Nigeria ====
Andorra
3
Avenir Sportif de la Marsa, Tunis, Tunisia
4 April 2009
clay (outdoors)

Nigeria
0

			1	2	3
1	(Andorra) (Nigeria)	Pau Gerbaud-Farras; Abdul-Mumin Babalola	6; 3	6; 3
2	(Andorra) (Nigeria)	Jean-Baptiste Poux-Gautier; Sunday Emmanuel	6; 3	6; 4
3	(Andorra) (Nigeria)	Jean-Baptiste Poux-Gautier / Jordi Vila-Vila; Candy Idoko / Lawal Shehu	6; 1	6; 3

==== Namibia vs. San Marino ====
Namibia
2
Avenir Sportif de la Marsa, Tunis, Tunisia
4 April 2009
clay (outdoors)

San Marino
1

			1	2	3
1	(Namibia) (San Marino)	Jean Erasmus; Domenico Vicini	2; 6	4; 6
2	(Namibia) (San Marino)	Jurgens Strydom; Giacomo Zonzini	6; 4	6; 4
3	(Namibia) (San Marino)	Jean Erasmus / Jurgens Strydom; Domenico Vicini / Giacomo Zonzini	6^{2} 7^{7}	6; 0	6; 3

==== Namibia vs. Nigeria ====
Namibia
1
Avenir Sportif de la Marsa, Tunis, Tunisia
5 April 2009
clay (outdoors)

Nigeria
2

			1	2	3
1	(Namibia) (Nigeria)	Jean Erasmus; Lawal Shehu	2; 6	3; 6
2	(Namibia) (Nigeria)	Jurgens Strydom; Sunday Emmanuel	6; 3	6; 4
3	(Namibia) (Nigeria)	Jean Erasmus / Jurgens Strydom; Candy Idoko / Lawal Shehu	1; 6	3; 6

==== San Marino vs. Andorra ====
San Marino
1
Avenir Sportif de la Marsa, Tunis, Tunisia
5 April 2009
clay (outdoors)

Andorra
2

			1	2	3
1	(San Marino) (Andorra)	Giacomo Zonzini; Hector Hormigo-Herrera	6; 4	3; 6	6; 2
2	(San Marino) (Andorra)	Diego Zonzini; Jean-Baptiste Poux-Gautier	2; 6	0; 6
3	(San Marino) (Andorra)	Alberto Brighi / Domenico Vicini; Pau Gerbaud-Farras / Jean-Baptiste Poux-Gautier	7; 5	3; 6	1; 6
