= Bosnia and Herzegovina Davis Cup team =

National tennis team

Bosnia and Herzegovina
- Captain: Zoran Zrnić
- ITF ranking: 30 ▼2 (15 September 2025)
- First year: 1996
- Years played: 29
- Ties played (W–L): 104 (56–48)
- Years in World Group: 6 (1–6)
- Most total wins: Mirza Bašić (38–26)
- Most singles wins: Damir Džumhur (25–16)
- Most doubles wins: Mirza Bašić (25–9)
- Best doubles team: Tomislav Brkić & Mirza Bašić (19–6)
- Most ties played: Tomislav Brkić (36)
- Most years played: Damir Džumhur (15)

The Bosnia and Herzegovina men's national tennis team represents Bosnia and Herzegovina in Davis Cup tennis competition and is governed by the Tennis Association of Bosnia and Herzegovina.

Bosnia and Herzegovina currently plays in the Davis Cup World Group I. They have played for promotion to the Davis Cup Finals two times: 2019 and 2023.

== History ==
Bosnia and Herzegovina competed in its first Davis Cup in 1996. Bosnian players previously represented Yugoslavia.

Notable former players that represented Bosnia in the Davis Cup include Amer Delić and Ivan Dodig, the latter of whom played for his hometown country of Bosnia up until 2006.

== Current Team ==
Player information and rankings as of 15 September 2025

Squad representing Bosnia and Herzegovina in the 2025 Davis Cup World Group I
Player	Current singles ranking	Current doubles ranking	First year played	Ties played	Total W–L	Singles W–L	Doubles W–L
Damir Džumhur	68	375	2010	26	27–18	25–16	2–2
Nerman Fatić	240	621	2013	13	6–8	4–6	2–2
Andrej Nedić	359	661	2022	4	0–4	0–4	0–0
Mirza Bašić	471	443	2007	36	34–22	13–17	25–9

=== Reserve/Injured Players ===
Tomislav Brkić ^{RES}

^{INJ} Unable to play due to injury.
^{RES} Reserve player.

== Results and schedule ==
=== 1996–1999 ===
Year	Competition	Date	Surface	Location	Opponent	Score	Result
1996	Europe/Africa Zone Group III Group B	20 May	Hard	Istanbul, Turkey	Armenia	1–2	Lost
1996	Europe/Africa Zone Group III Group B	21 May	Hard	Istanbul, Turkey	Tunisia	2–1	Won
1996	Europe/Africa Zone Group III Group B	22 May	Hard	Istanbul, Turkey	Turkey	1–2	Lost
1996	Europe/Africa Zone Group III Group B	23 May	Hard	Istanbul, Turkey	Georgia	1–2	Lost
1996	Europe/Africa Zone Group III Group B	24 May	Hard	Istanbul, Turkey	Liechtenstein	2–1	Won
1996	Europe/Africa Zone Group III Group B	26 May	Hard	Istanbul, Turkey	Benin	3–0	Won
1997	Europe/Africa Zone Group III Group B	22 January	Hard	Dakar, Senegal	Luxembourg	2–1	Lost
1997	Europe/Africa Zone Group III Group B	23 January	Hard	Dakar, Senegal	Senegal	0–3	Lost
1997	Europe/Africa Zone Group III Group B	24 January	Hard	Dakar, Senegal	Armenia	3–0	Won
1997	Europe/Africa Zone Group III First round	25 January	Hard	Dakar, Senegal	Ethiopia	3–0	Won
1997	Europe/Africa Zone Group III Final	26 January	Hard	Dakar, Senegal	San Marino	3–0	Won
1998	Europe/Africa Zone Group III Group B	21 January	Hard	Lomé, Togo	Togo	1–3	Lost
1998	Europe/Africa Zone Group III Group B	22 January	Hard	Lomé, Togo	Kenya	3–0	Won
1998	Europe/Africa Zone Group III Group B	23 January	Hard	Lomé, Togo	Greece	0–3	Lost
1998	Europe/Africa Zone Group III First round	24 January	Hard	Lomé, Togo	Madagascar	2–1	Won
1998	Europe/Africa Zone Group III Final	25 January	Hard	Lomé, Togo	Kenya	3–0	Won
1999	Europe/Africa Zone Group III Group B	24 February	Clay	Cairo, Egypt	Egypt	0–3	Lost
1999	Europe/Africa Zone Group III Group B	25 February	Clay	Cairo, Egypt	Nigeria	2–1	Won
1999	Europe/Africa Zone Group III Group B	26 February	Clay	Cairo, Egypt	Benin	3–0	Won
1999	Europe/Africa Zone Group III First round	27 February	Clay	Cairo, Egypt	Luxembourg	0–2	Lost
1999	Europe/Africa Zone Group III Final	28 February	Clay	Cairo, Egypt	Tunisia	2–0	Won

=== 2000–2009 ===
Year	Competition	Date	Surface	Location	Opponent	Score	Result
2000	Europe/Africa Zone Group III Group A	24 May	Clay	Tunis, Tunisia	Togo	2–1	Won
2000	Europe/Africa Zone Group III Group A	25 May	Clay	Tunis, Tunisia	Georgia	3–0	Won
2000	Europe/Africa Zone Group III Group A	26 May	Clay	Tunis, Tunisia	Malta	1–0	Won
2000	Europe/Africa Zone Group III First round	27 May	Clay	Tunis, Tunisia	Monaco	1–2	Lost
2000	Europe/Africa Zone Group III Final	28 May	Clay	Tunis, Tunisia	Georgia	1–2	Lost
2001	Europe/Africa Zone Group III Group B	23 May	Clay	Port Louis, Mauritius	Egypt	1–2	Lost
2001	Europe/Africa Zone Group III Group B	24 May	Clay	Port Louis, Mauritius	Mauritius	3–0	Won
2001	Europe/Africa Zone Group III First round	26 May	Clay	Port Louis, Mauritius	Bulgaria	1–2	Lost
2001	Europe/Africa Zone Group III Final	27 May	Clay	Port Louis, Mauritius	Macedonia	2–1	Won
2002	Europe/Africa Zone Group III Group B	3 April	Clay	Antalya, Turkey	Iceland	1–2	Lost
2002	Europe/Africa Zone Group III Group B	4 April	Clay	Antalya, Turkey	Botswana	3–0	Won
2002	Europe/Africa Zone Group III Group B	5 April	Clay	Antalya, Turkey	Turkey	2–1	Won
2002	Europe/Africa Zone Group III Promotion play-offs	6 April	Clay	Antalya, Turkey	Andorra	1–2	Lost
2002	Europe/Africa Zone Group III Promotion play-offs	7 April	Clay	Antalya, Turkey	Monaco	0–3	Lost
2003	Europe/Africa Zone Group III Group B	11 June	Clay	Jūrmala, Latvia	Georgia	0–3	Lost
2003	Europe/Africa Zone Group III Group B	12 June	Clay	Jūrmala, Latvia	Cyprus	0–3	Lost
2003	Europe/Africa Zone Group III Group B	13 June	Clay	Jūrmala, Latvia	Turkey	0–3	Lost
2003	Europe/Africa Zone Group III Relegation play-offs	14 June	Clay	Jūrmala, Latvia	Moldova	0–3	Lost
2003	Europe/Africa Zone Group III Relegation play-offs	15 June	Clay	Jūrmala, Latvia	Macedonia	0–3	Relegated
2004	Europe/Africa Zone Group IV Group B	15 July	Clay	Chișinău, Moldova	Rwanda	3–0	Won
2004	Europe/Africa Zone Group IV Group B	16 July	Clay	Chișinău, Moldova	Moldova	2–1	Won
2004	Europe/Africa Zone Group IV Group B	16 July	Clay	Chişinău, Moldova	Uganda	3–0	Won
2004	Europe/Africa Zone Group IV Promotion play-offs	17 July	Clay	Chişinău, Moldova	Mauritius	3–0	Won
2004	Europe/Africa Zone Group IV Promotion play-offs	18 July	Clay	Chişinău, Moldova	Armenia	3–0	Promoted
2005	Europe/Africa Zone Group III Group B	27 April	Clay	Cairo, Egypt	Lithuania	2–1	Won
2005	Europe/Africa Zone Group III Group B	28 April	Clay	Cairo, Egypt	Egypt	0–3	Lost
2005	Europe/Africa Zone Group III Group B	29 April	Clay	Cairo, Egypt	Madagascar	2–1	Won
2005	Europe/Africa Zone Group III Promotion play-offs	30 April	Clay	Cairo, Egypt	Macedonia	0–3	Lost
2005	Europe/Africa Zone Group III Promotion play-offs	31 April	Clay	Cairo, Egypt	Andorra	1–2	Lost
2006	Europe/Africa Zone Group III Group B	19 July	Clay	Banja Luka, Bosnia and Herzegovina	Moldova	2–1	Won
2006	Europe/Africa Zone Group III Group B	20 July	Clay	Banja Luka, Bosnia and Herzegovina	Monaco	0–3	Lost
2006	Europe/Africa Zone Group III Group B	21 July	Clay	Banja Luka, Bosnia and Herzegovina	Turkey	1–2	Lost
2006	Europe/Africa Zone Group III Relegation play-offs	22 July	Clay	Banja Luka, Bosnia and Herzegovina	Armenia	3–0	Won
2006	Europe/Africa Zone Group III Relegation play-offs	23 July	Clay	Banja Luka, Bosnia and Herzegovina	Andorra	2–1	Won
2007	Europe/Africa Zone Group III Group A	9 May	Clay	Cairo, Egypt	Moldova	1–2	Lost
2007	Europe/Africa Zone Group III Group A	10 May	Clay	Cairo, Egypt	Lithuania	1–2	Lost
2007	Europe/Africa Zone Group III Group A	11 May	Clay	Cairo, Egypt	Ireland	0–3	Lost
2007	Europe/Africa Zone Group III Relegation play-offs	12 May	Clay	Cairo, Egypt	Iceland	3–0	Won
2007	Europe/Africa Zone Group III Relegation play-offs	13 May	Clay	Cairo, Egypt	San Marino	3–0	Won
2008	Europe/Africa Zone Group III Group B	7 May	Clay	Yerevan, Armenia	Ghana	3–0	Won
2008	Europe/Africa Zone Group III Group B	8 May	Clay	Yerevan, Armenia	Estonia	3–0	Won
2008	Europe/Africa Zone Group III Group B	9 May	Clay	Yerevan, Armenia	Lithuania	1–2	Lost
2008	Europe/Africa Zone Group III Promotion play-offs	10 May	Clay	Yerevan, Armenia	Moldova	0–3	Lost
2008	Europe/Africa Zone Group III Promotion play-offs	11 May	Clay	Yerevan, Armenia	Norway	1–2	Lost
2009	Europe/Africa Zone Group III Group B	1 April	Clay	Tunis, Tunisia	Namibia	3–0	Won
2009	Europe/Africa Zone Group III Group B	2 April	Clay	Tunis, Tunisia	Andorra	3–0	Won
2009	Europe/Africa Zone Group III Group B	3 April	Clay	Tunis, Tunisia	Norway	1–2	Lost
2009	Europe/Africa Zone Group III Promotion play-offs	4 April	Clay	Tunis, Tunisia	Morocco	1–2	Lost
2009	Europe/Africa Zone Group III Promotion play-offs	5 April	Clay	Tunis, Tunisia	Tunisia	2–1	Promoted

=== 2010–2019 ===
Year	Competition	Date	Surface	Location	Opponent	Score	Result
2010	Europe/Africa Zone Group II 1st round	5–7 March	Clay	Veles, Macedonia	Macedonia	3–2	Won
2010	Europe/Africa Zone Group II 2nd round	9–11 July	Clay	Tallinn, Estonia	Estonia	3–2	Won
2010	Europe/Africa Zone Group II 3rd round	17–19 September	Clay	Cruz Quebrada, Portugal	Portugal	2–3	Lost
2011	Europe/Africa Zone Group II 1st round	4–6 March	Clay	Marrakesh, Morocco	Morocco	3–2	Won
2011	Europe/Africa Zone Group II 2nd round	8–10 July	Hard	Tuzla, Bosnia and Herzegovina	Estonia	3–2	Won
2011	Europe/Africa Zone Group II 3rd round	16–18 September	Hard	Hillerød, Denmark	Denmark	2–3	Lost
2012	Europe/Africa Zone Group II 1st round	10–12 February	Hard	Ankara, Turkey	Turkey	3–1	Won
2012	Europe/Africa Zone Group II 2nd round	6–8 April	Hard	Minsk, Belarus	Belarus	1–4	Lost
2013	Europe/Africa Zone Group II 1st round	1–3 February	Hard	Sarajevo, Bosnia and Herzegovina	Luxembourg	4–1	Won
2013	Europe/Africa Zone Group II 2nd round	5–7 April	Clay	Mostar, Bosnia and Herzegovina	Moldova	1–3	Lost
2014	Europe/Africa Zone Group II 1st round	31 Jan – 2 Feb	Carpet	Sarajevo, Bosnia and Herzegovina	Greece	3–1	Won
2014	Europe/Africa Zone Group II 2nd round	4–6 April	Hard	Helsinki, Finland	Finland	3–2	Won
2014	Europe/Africa Zone Group II 3rd round	12–14 September	Hard	Sarajevo, Bosnia and Herzegovina	Lithuania	2–3	Lost
2015	Europe/Africa Zone Group II 1st round	6–8 March	Hard	Harare, Zimbabwe	Zimbabwe	4–1	Won
2015	Europe/Africa Zone Group II 2nd round	17–19 July	Clay	Siófok, Hungary	Hungary	2–3	Lost
2016	Europe/Africa Zone Group II 1st round	4–6 March	Carpet	Zenica, Bosnia and Herzegovina	Tunisia	3–1	Won
2016	Europe/Africa Zone Group II 2nd round	15–17 July	Clay	Bihać, Bosnia and Herzegovina	Turkey	3–1	Won
2016	Europe/Africa Zone Group II 3rd round	16–18 September	Hard	Vilnius, Lithuania	Lithuania	5–0	Promoted
2017	Europe/Africa Zone Group I 1st round	3–5 February	Hard	Zenica, Bosnia and Herzegovina	Poland	5–0	Won
2017	Europe/Africa Zone Group I 2nd round	7–9 April	Hard	Zenica, Bosnia and Herzegovina	Netherlands	1–3	Lost
2018	Europe/Africa Zone Group I 2nd round	6–7 April	Clay	Bratislava, Slovakia	Slovakia	3–2	Won
2018	World Group play-offs	14–16 September	Hard	Osaka, Japan	Japan	0–4	Lost
2019	Davis Cup qualifying round	1–2 February	Hard	Adelaide, Australia	Australia	0–4	Lost
2019	Europe/Africa Zone Group I	14–15 September	Hard	Zenica, Bosnia and Herzegovina	Czech Republic	2–3	Lost

=== 2020– ===
Year	Competition	Date	Surface	Location	Opponent	Score	Result
2020–21	Davis Cup World Group I play-offs	6–7 March	Hard	Zenica, Bosnia and Herzegovina	South Africa	3–1	Won
2020–21	Davis Cup World Group I	16–17 September	Clay	Lima, Peru	Peru	2–3	Lost
2022	Davis Cup World Group I play-offs	4–6 March 2022	Clay	Tunis, Tunisia	Tunisia	3–1	Won
2022	Davis Cup World Group I	16–17 September 2022	Clay	Široki Brijeg, Bosnia and Herzegovina	Mexico	3–1	Won
2023	Davis Cup qualifying round	3–4 February 2023	Hard	Stockholm, Sweden	Sweden	1–3	Lost
2023	Davis Cup World Group I	16–17 September 2023	Clay	Mostar, Bosnia and Herzegovina	Germany	0–4	Lost
2024	Davis Cup World Group I play-offs	3–4 February 2024	Hard	Burgas, Bulgaria	Bulgaria	3–1	Won
2024	Davis Cup World Group I	14–15 September 2024	Hard	Taipei, Chinese Taipei	Chinese Taipei	2–3	Lost
2025	Davis Cup World Group I play-offs	31 January–1 February 2025	Hard	Tashkent, Uzbekistan	Uzbekistan	3–1	Won
2025	Davis Cup World Group I	13–14 September 2025	Clay	Quito, Ecuador	Ecuador	2–3	Lost

== See also ==
- Davis Cup
- Bosnia and Herzegovina Billie Jean King Cup team
