= 2012 Davis Cup Europe/Africa Zone Group II =

International tennis competition

The Europe and Africa Zone is one of the three zones of regional Davis Cup competition in 2012.

In the Europe and Africa Zone there are four different groups in which teams compete against each other to advance to the next group.

== Draw ==
Play-offs
Morocco
Monaco | 3
Morocco | 2
Egypt
Ireland | 3
Egypt | 2
Turkey
Moldova | 3
Turkey | 2
Madagascar
Luxembourg | 4
Madagascar | 1

First round
Ukraine
1 | Ukraine | 5
Monaco | 0
Cyprus
7 | Cyprus | 3
Morocco | 2
Hungary
4 | Hungary | 3
Ireland | 2
Egypt
6 | Latvia | 3
Egypt | 2
Belarus
Moldova | 1
5 | Belarus | 4
Turkey
Turkey | 1
3 | Bosnia and Herzegovina | 3
Estonia
Luxembourg | 0
8 | Estonia | 5
Poland
Madagascar | 0
2 | Poland | 5

Second round
Ukraine
1 | Ukraine | 5
7 | Cyprus | 0
Hungary
4 | Hungary | 2
6 | Latvia | 3
Belarus
5 | Belarus | 4
3 | Bosnia and Herzegovina | 1
Poland
8 | Estonia | 1
2 | Poland | 4

Third round
Latvia
1 | Ukraine | 3
6 | Latvia | 2
Poland
5 | Belarus | 2
2 | Poland | 3

- Morocco, Egypt, Turkey, and Madagascar relegated to Group III in 2013.
- Ukraine and Poland promoted to Group I in 2013.

== First round ==
=== Ukraine vs. Monaco ===
Ukraine
5
Megaron Tennis Club, Dnipropetrovsk, Ukraine
10–12 February 2012
hard (indoor)

Monaco
0

| | | | 1 | 2 | 3 | 4 | 5 |
|---|---|---|---|---|---|---|---|
| 1 | (Ukraine) (Monaco) | Illya Marchenko; Benjamin Balleret | 3; 6 | 6; 3 | 6; 1 | 6; 1 |
| 2 | (Ukraine) (Monaco) | Sergiy Stakhovsky; Jean-René Lisnard | 6; 1 | 6^{3} 7^{7} | 7^{7} 6^{3} | 6; 3 |
| 3 | (Ukraine) (Monaco) | Denys Molchanov / Sergiy Stakhovsky; Guillaume Couillard / Thomas Oger | 6; 2 | 7^{7} 6^{3} | 6; 4 |
| 4 | (Ukraine) (Monaco) | Denys Molchanov; Benjamin Balleret | 6; 3 | 3; 6 | 6; 4 |
| 5 | (Ukraine) (Monaco) | Illya Marchenko; Jean-René Lisnard | 6; 3 | 6; 2 |

=== Cyprus vs. Morocco ===
Cyprus
3
Spyros Kyprianou Athletic Center, Limassol, Cyprus
10–12 February 2012
hard (indoor)

Morocco
2

| | | | 1 | 2 | 3 | 4 | 5 |
|---|---|---|---|---|---|---|---|
| 1 | (Cyprus) (Morocco) | Marcos Baghdatis; Younès Rachidi | 6; 0 | 6; 3 | 6; 0 |
| 2 | (Cyprus) (Morocco) | Sergis Kyratzis; Yassine Idmbarek | 5; 7 | 6; 4 | 6; 3 | 0; 6 | 4; 6 |
| 3 | (Cyprus) (Morocco) | Marcos Baghdatis / Rareş Cuzdriorean; Anas Fattar / Younès Rachidi | 6; 3 | 6; 0 | 6; 2 |
| 4 | (Cyprus) (Morocco) | Marcos Baghdatis; Yassine Idmbarek | 6; 4 | 6; 1 | 6; 0 |
| 5 | (Cyprus) (Morocco) | Christos Hadjigeorgiou; Younès Rachidi | 2; 6 | 2; 6 |

=== Hungary vs. Ireland ===
Hungary
3
Szeged Városi Sportcsarnok, Szeged, Hungary
10–12 February 2012
carpet (indoor)

Ireland
2

| | | | 1 | 2 | 3 | 4 | 5 |
|---|---|---|---|---|---|---|---|
| 1 | (Hungary) (Republic of Ireland) | Ádám Kellner; James McGee | 6; 4 | 3; 6 | 4; 6 | 7^{9} 6^{7} | 4; 6 |
| 2 | (Hungary) (Republic of Ireland) | Márton Fucsovics; Conor Niland | 7^{7} 6^{4} | 6; 4 | 6^{3} 7^{7} | 2; 6 | 6; 2 |
| 3 | (Hungary) (Republic of Ireland) | Attila Balázs / Ádám Kellner; Sam Barry / James McGee | 7^{8} 6^{6} | 6^{2} 7^{7} | 6; 2 | 7^{10} 6^{8} |
| 4 | (Hungary) (Republic of Ireland) | Attila Balázs; Conor Niland | 6; 1 | 6; 2 | 6; 1 |
| 5 | (Hungary) (Republic of Ireland) | Márton Fucsovics; Sam Barry | 6; 4 | 3; 6 | 2; 6 |

=== Latvia vs. Egypt ===
Latvia
3
El Gezera Sporting Club, Cairo, Egypt
10–12 February 2012
clay

Egypt
2

| | | | 1 | 2 | 3 | 4 | 5 |
|---|---|---|---|---|---|---|---|
| 1 | (Latvia) (Egypt) | Andis Juška; Mohamed Safwat | 6; 3 | 6; 4 | 1; 6 | 6; 3 |
| 2 | (Latvia) (Egypt) | Ernests Gulbis; Sherif Sabry | 6; 2 | 6; 3 | 6; 3 |
| 3 | (Latvia) (Egypt) | Andis Juška / Deniss Pavlovs; Sherif Sabry / Mohamed Safwat | 7; 5 | 4; 6 | 3; 6 | 2; 6 |
| 4 | (Latvia) (Egypt) | Ernests Gulbis; Mohamed Safwat | 6; 3 | 6; 4 | 6; 3 |
| 5 | (Latvia) (Egypt) | Martins Podzus; Karim-Mohamed Maamoun | 2; 6 | 6; 3 | 4; 6 |

=== Moldova vs. Belarus ===
Moldova
1
Republic Olympic Training Centre for Tennis, Minsk, Belarus
10–12 February 2012
hard (indoor)

Belarus
4

| | | | 1 | 2 | 3 | 4 | 5 |
|---|---|---|---|---|---|---|---|
| 1 | (Moldova) (Belarus) | Roman Borvanov; Uladzimir Ignatik | 4; 6 | 2; 6 | 4; 6 |
| 2 | (Moldova) (Belarus) | Radu Albot; Dzmitry Zhyrmont | 6^{7} 7^{9} | 7; 5 | 6; 4 | 6; 2 |
| 3 | (Moldova) (Belarus) | Roman Borvanov / Maxim Dubarenco; Aliaksandr Bury / Max Mirnyi | 2; 6 | 2; 6 | 4; 6 |
| 4 | (Moldova) (Belarus) | Radu Albot; Uladzimir Ignatik | 5; 7 | 6^{2} 7^{7} | 1; 6 |
| 5 | (Moldova) (Belarus) | Andrei Gorban; Dzmitry Zhyrmont | 6; 2 | 4; 6 | 4; 6 |

=== Turkey vs. Bosnia and Herzegovina ===
Turkey
1
Ankara Tenis Kulubu, Ankara, Turkey
10–12 February 2012
hard (indoor)

Bosnia and Herzegovina
3

| | | | 1 | 2 | 3 | 4 | 5 |
|---|---|---|---|---|---|---|---|---|
| 1 | (Turkey) (Bosnia and Herzegovina) | Baris Erguden; Amer Delić | 6^{5} 7^{7} | 4; 6 | 3; 6 |
| 2 | (Turkey) (Bosnia and Herzegovina) | Marsel İlhan; Tomislav Brkić | 6; 1 | 6; 1 | 6; 3 |
| 3 | (Turkey) (Bosnia and Herzegovina) | Marsel İlhan / Ergün Zorlu; Tomislav Brkić / Amer Delić | 6; 4 | 4; 6 | 3; 6 | 6^{2} 7^{7} |
| 4 | (Turkey) (Bosnia and Herzegovina) | Marsel İlhan; Amer Delić | 3; 6 | 6; 1 | 6^{10} 7^{12} | 7^{8} 6^{6} | 9; 11 |
| 5 | (Turkey) (Bosnia and Herzegovina) | Baris Erguden; Tomislav Brkić | | | | | | not played |

=== Luxembourg vs. Estonia ===
Luxembourg
0
Tere Tennisekeskus, Tallinn, Estonia
10–12 February 2012
hard (indoor)

Estonia
5

| | | | 1 | 2 | 3 | 4 | 5 |
|---|---|---|---|---|---|---|---|
| 1 | (Luxembourg) (Estonia) | Gilles Kremer; Jürgen Zopp | 2; 6 | 2; 6 | 2; 6 |
| 2 | (Luxembourg) (Estonia) | Mike Scheidweiler; Jaak Põldma | 6^{2} 7^{7} | 1; 6 | 3; 6 |
| 3 | (Luxembourg) (Estonia) | Gilles Kremer / Mike Scheidweiler; Mait Künnap / Jürgen Zopp | 4; 6 | 4; 6 | 4; 6 |
| 4 | (Luxembourg) (Estonia) | Mike Vermeer; Vladimir Ivanov | 0; 6 | 6; 3 | 1; 6 |
| 5 | (Luxembourg) (Estonia) | Laurent Bram; Jaak Põldma | 4; 6 | 3; 6 |

=== Madagascar vs. Poland ===
Madagascar
0
Arena Ursynow Hala Widowiskowo-Sportowa, Warsaw, Poland
10–12 February 2012
carpet (indoor)

Poland
5

| | | | 1 | 2 | 3 | 4 | 5 |
|---|---|---|---|---|---|---|---|
| 1 | (Madagascar) (Poland) | Antso Rakotondramanga; Grzegorz Panfil | 6^{7} 7^{9} | 3; 6 | 2; 6 |
| 2 | (Madagascar) (Poland) | Jacob Rasolondrazana; Jerzy Janowicz | 1; 6 | 1; 6 | 3; 6 |
| 3 | (Madagascar) (Poland) | Lofo Ramiaramanana / Ando Rasolomalala; Mariusz Fyrstenberg / Marcin Matkowski | 1; 6 | 4; 6 | 4; 6 |
| 4 | (Madagascar) (Poland) | Lofo Ramiaramanana; Jerzy Janowicz | 2; 6 | 2; 6 |
| 5 | (Madagascar) (Poland) | Ando Rasolomalala; Grzegorz Panfil | 4; 6 | 1; 6 |

== Second round ==
=== Ukraine vs. Cyprus ===
Ukraine
5
Megaron Tennis Club, Dnipropetrovsk, Ukraine
6–8 April 2012
hard (indoor)

Cyprus
0

| | | | 1 | 2 | 3 | 4 | 5 |
|---|---|---|---|---|---|---|---|
| 1 | (Ukraine) (Cyprus) | Sergiy Stakhovsky; Christos Hadjigeorgiou | 6; 1 | 6; 2 | 6; 1 |
| 2 | (Ukraine) (Cyprus) | Sergey Bubka; Sergis Kyratzis | 6; 3 | 7^{7} 6^{2} | 6; 3 |
| 3 | (Ukraine) (Cyprus) | Denys Molchanov / Sergiy Stakhovsky; Rareş Cuzdriorean / Dean Georgiou | 6; 1 | 6; 2 | 6; 2 |
| 4 | (Ukraine) (Cyprus) | Denys Molchanov; Sergis Kyratzis | 6; 2 | 6; 2 |
| 5 | (Ukraine) (Cyprus) | Vladyslav Manafov; Christos Hadjigeorgiou | 6; 3 | 6; 2 |

=== Hungary vs. Latvia ===
Hungary
2
Bujtosi Szabadidő Csarnok, Nyíregyháza, Hungary
6–8 April 2012
carpet (indoor)

Latvia
3

| | | | 1 | 2 | 3 | 4 | 5 |
|---|---|---|---|---|---|---|---|
| 1 | (Hungary) (Latvia) | Márton Fucsovics; Ernests Gulbis | 6^{7} 7^{9} | 6; 3 | 6; 4 | 4; 6 | 6; 3 |
| 2 | (Hungary) (Latvia) | Ádám Kellner; Deniss Pavlovs | 6; 3 | 6^{2} 7^{7} | 6; 2 | 6; 2 |
| 3 | (Hungary) (Latvia) | Attila Balázs / Kornél Bardóczky; Ernests Gulbis / Andis Juška | 7^{7} 6^{5} | 3; 6 | 4; 6 | 2; 6 |
| 4 | (Hungary) (Latvia) | Attila Balázs; Ernests Gulbis | 4; 6 | 3; 6 | 3; 6 |
| 5 | (Hungary) (Latvia) | Márton Fucsovics; Andis Juška | 6^{6} 7^{8} | 6^{2} 7^{7} | 4; 6 |

=== Belarus vs. Bosnia and Herzegovina ===
Belarus
4
Republic Olympic Training Centre for Tennis, Minsk, Belarus
6–8 April 2012
hard (indoor)

Bosnia and Herzegovina
1

| | | | 1 | 2 | 3 | 4 | 5 |
|---|---|---|---|---|---|---|---|
| 1 | (Belarus) (Bosnia and Herzegovina) | Dzmitry Zhyrmont; Amer Delić | 4; 6 | 4; 6 | 6; 4 | 5; 7 |
| 2 | (Belarus) (Bosnia and Herzegovina) | Uladzimir Ignatik; Damir Džumhur | 6; 3 | 7^{7} 6^{4} | 6; 3 |
| 3 | (Belarus) (Bosnia and Herzegovina) | Aliaksandr Bury / Max Mirnyi; Tomislav Brkić / Amer Delić | 6; 2 | 7^{7} 6^{2} | 7^{8} 6^{6} |
| 4 | (Belarus) (Bosnia and Herzegovina) | Uladzimir Ignatik; Amer Delić | 7^{18} 6^{16} | 7^{9} 6^{7} | 6; 4 |
| 5 | (Belarus) (Bosnia and Herzegovina) | Dzmitry Zhyrmont; Damir Džumhur | 6; 1 | 7; 5 |

=== Estonia vs. Poland ===
Estonia
1
OSiR Hala Widowiskowo-sportowa, Inowrocław, Poland
6–8 April 2012
carpet (indoor)

Poland
4

| | | | 1 | 2 | 3 | 4 | 5 |
|---|---|---|---|---|---|---|---|
| 1 | (Estonia) (Poland) | Vladimir Ivanov; Łukasz Kubot | 3; 6 | 2; 6 | 2; 6 |
| 2 | (Estonia) (Poland) | Jürgen Zopp; Jerzy Janowicz | 6^{4} 7^{7} | 6^{2} 7^{7} | 6; 3 | 1; 6 |
| 3 | (Estonia) (Poland) | Mait Künnap / Jürgen Zopp; Mariusz Fyrstenberg / Marcin Matkowski | 6^{5} 7^{7} | 5; 7 | 4; 6 |
| 4 | (Estonia) (Poland) | Jürgen Zopp; Mariusz Fyrstenberg | 6; 3 | 7^{7} 6^{4} |
| 5 | (Estonia) (Poland) | Jaak Põldma; Jerzy Janowicz | 0; 6 | 6^{3} 7^{7} |

== Play-offs ==
=== Monaco vs. Morocco ===
Monaco
3
Club Olympique Casablancais, Casablanca, Morocco
6–8 April 2012
clay (outdoor)

Morocco
2

| | | | 1 | 2 | 3 | 4 | 5 |
|---|---|---|---|---|---|---|---|
| 1 | (Monaco) (Morocco) | Benjamin Balleret; Yassine Idmbarek | 5; 7 | 5; 7 | 3; 6 |
| 2 | (Monaco) (Morocco) | Jean-René Lisnard; Mehdi Ziadi | 7^{7} 6^{4} | 6; 4 | 6; 3 |
| 3 | (Monaco) (Morocco) | Guillaume Couillard / Thomas Oger; Anas Fattar / Mehdi Ziadi | 4; 6 | 5; 7 | 5; 7 |
| 4 | (Monaco) (Morocco) | Benjamin Balleret; Anas Fattar | 6; 1 | 6; 4 | 6; 2 |
| 5 | (Monaco) (Morocco) | Jean-René Lisnard; Yassine Idmbarek | 6; 4 | 6; 4 | 4; 6 | 7^{7} 6^{3} |

=== Ireland vs. Egypt ===
Ireland
3
El Gezera Sporting Club, Cairo, Egypt
6–8 April 2012
clay (outdoor)

Egypt
2

| | | | 1 | 2 | 3 | 4 | 5 |
|---|---|---|---|---|---|---|---|
| 1 | (Republic of Ireland) (Egypt) | James McGee; Karim-Mohamed Maamoun | 2; 6 | 6; 4 | 6; 2 | 7; 5 |
| 2 | (Republic of Ireland) (Egypt) | Conor Niland; Sherif Sabry | 6; 2 | 1; 6 | 0; 6 | 2; 6 |
| 3 | (Republic of Ireland) (Egypt) | Sam Barry / James McGee; Karim-Mohamed Maamoun / Sherif Sabry | 3; 6 | 7^{7} 6^{3} | 6; 2 | 7^{7} 6^{3} |
| 4 | (Republic of Ireland) (Egypt) | Sam Barry; Karim-Mohamed Maamoun | 3; 6 | 7^{7} 6^{4} | 1; 6 | 6; 1 | 4; 6 |
| 5 | (Republic of Ireland) (Egypt) | James McGee; Sherif Sabry | 6; 2 | 5; 7 | 7; 5 | 3; 6 | 6; 4 |

=== Moldova vs. Turkey ===
Turkey
2
Bakirkoy Spor Vakfi Sosyal Tesisleri, Istanbul, Turkey
6–8 April 2012
hard (indoor)

Moldova
3

| | | | 1 | 2 | 3 | 4 | 5 |
|---|---|---|---|---|---|---|---|
| 1 | (Turkey) (Moldova) | Marsel İlhan; Maxim Dubarenco | 6; 4 | 6; 4 | 6; 2 |
| 2 | (Turkey) (Moldova) | Haluk Akkoyun; Radu Albot | 4; 6 | 2; 6 | 1; 6 |
| 3 | (Turkey) (Moldova) | Marsel İlhan / Ergün Zorlu; Radu Albot / Andrei Ciumac | 6; 4 | 4; 6 | 5; 7 | 6^{5} 7^{7} |
| 4 | (Turkey) (Moldova) | Marsel İlhan; Radu Albot | 7^{7} 6^{4} | 6; 2 | 6; 3 |
| 5 | (Turkey) (Moldova) | Haluk Akkoyun; Maxim Dubarenco | 2; 6 | 7; 5 | 1; 6 | 6; 3 | 4; 6 |

=== Madagascar vs. Luxembourg ===
Madagascar
1
Association Culturelle et Sportive d'Ambohidahy, Antananarivo, Madagascar
6–8 April 2012
clay (outdoor)

Luxembourg
4

| | | | 1 | 2 | 3 | 4 | 5 |
|---|---|---|---|---|---|---|---|
| 1 | (Madagascar) (Luxembourg) | Lofo Ramiaramanana; Laurent Bram | 1; 6 | 4; 6 | 4; 6 |
| 2 | (Madagascar) (Luxembourg) | Jacob Rasolondrazana; Gilles Müller | 3; 6 | 1; 6 | 6^{3} 7^{7} |
| 3 | (Madagascar) (Luxembourg) | Antso Rakotondramanga / Jacob Rasolondrazana; Gilles Müller / Mike Scheidweiler | 5; 7 | 3; 6 | 5; 7 |
| 4 | (Madagascar) (Luxembourg) | Antso Rakotondramanga; Gilles Kremer | 7^{7} 6^{2} | 7; 5 |
| 5 | (Madagascar) (Luxembourg) | Ando Rasolomalala; Laurent Bram | 4; 6 | 6; 3 | 5; 7 |

== Third round ==
=== Ukraine vs. Latvia ===
Ukraine
3
Liepāja Olimpiskais Centrs, Liepāja, Latvia
14–16 September 2012
hard (indoor)

Latvia
2

| | | | 1 | 2 | 3 | 4 | 5 |
|---|---|---|---|---|---|---|---|
| 1 | (Ukraine) (Latvia) | Sergey Bubka; Ernests Gulbis | 6; 4 | 3; 6 | 4; 6 | 2; 6 |
| 2 | (Ukraine) (Latvia) | Sergiy Stakhovsky; Andis Juška | 6; 3 | 6; 4 | 6; 4 |
| 3 | (Ukraine) (Latvia) | Sergey Bubka / Sergiy Stakhovsky; Ernests Gulbis / Andis Juška | 6; 4 | 3; 6 | 2; 6 | 6; 1 | 6; 4 |
| 4 | (Ukraine) (Latvia) | Sergiy Stakhovsky; Ernests Gulbis | 0; 6 | 3; 6 | 1; 6 |
| 5 | (Ukraine) (Latvia) | Illya Marchenko; Andis Juška | 6; 4 | 6; 3 | 7; 5 |

=== Belarus vs. Poland ===
Belarus
2
Miejski Osrodek Sportu i Rekreacji, Łódź, Poland
14–16 September 2012
hard (indoor)

Poland
3

| | | | 1 | 2 | 3 | 4 | 5 |
|---|---|---|---|---|---|---|---|---|
| 1 | (Belarus) (Poland) | Dzmitry Zhyrmont; Łukasz Kubot | 1; 6 | 4; 6 | 2; 6 |
| 2 | (Belarus) (Poland) | Uladzimir Ignatik; Jerzy Janowicz | 6^{4} 7^{7} | 2; 6 | 3; 6 |
| 3 | (Belarus) (Poland) | Aliaksandr Bury / Max Mirnyi; Mariusz Fyrstenberg / Marcin Matkowski | 4; 6 | 6^{5} 7^{7} | 7^{7} 6^{3} | 4; 6 |
| 4 | (Belarus) (Poland) | Aliaksandr Bury; Marcin Matkowski | 6; 3 | 6; 3 |
| 5 | (Belarus) (Poland) | Dzmitry Zhyrmont; Jerzy Janowicz | | | | | | w/o |
