= Norway Davis Cup team =

Men's tennis team in Norway

Norway
- Captain: Anders Håseth
- Nations Ranking: 26 (21 September 2026)
- First year: 1928
- Years played: 90
- Ties played (W–L): 154 (63−91)
- Years in World Group: 5 (3-4)
- Best finish: World Group play-off (1995)
- Most total wins: Stian Boretti (38−37)
- Most singles wins: Stian Boretti (26−19)
- Most doubles wins: Stian Boretti (12−18)
- Best doubles team: Stian Boretti/Erling Tveit (7−6),Viktor Durasovic/Casper Ruud (7-6)
- Most ties played: Stian Boretti (39)
- Most years played: Stian Boretti (15)

The Norway Davis Cup team represents Norway in the Davis Cup competition and is governed by the Norwegian Tennis Association.

Norway currently compete in World Group I. They never qualified for the World Group in the old Davis Cup format, though they reached the World Group play-offs in 1995. They have still yet to participate in the new format's Davis Cup Finals.

== History ==
=== Before World War II (1928–39) ===
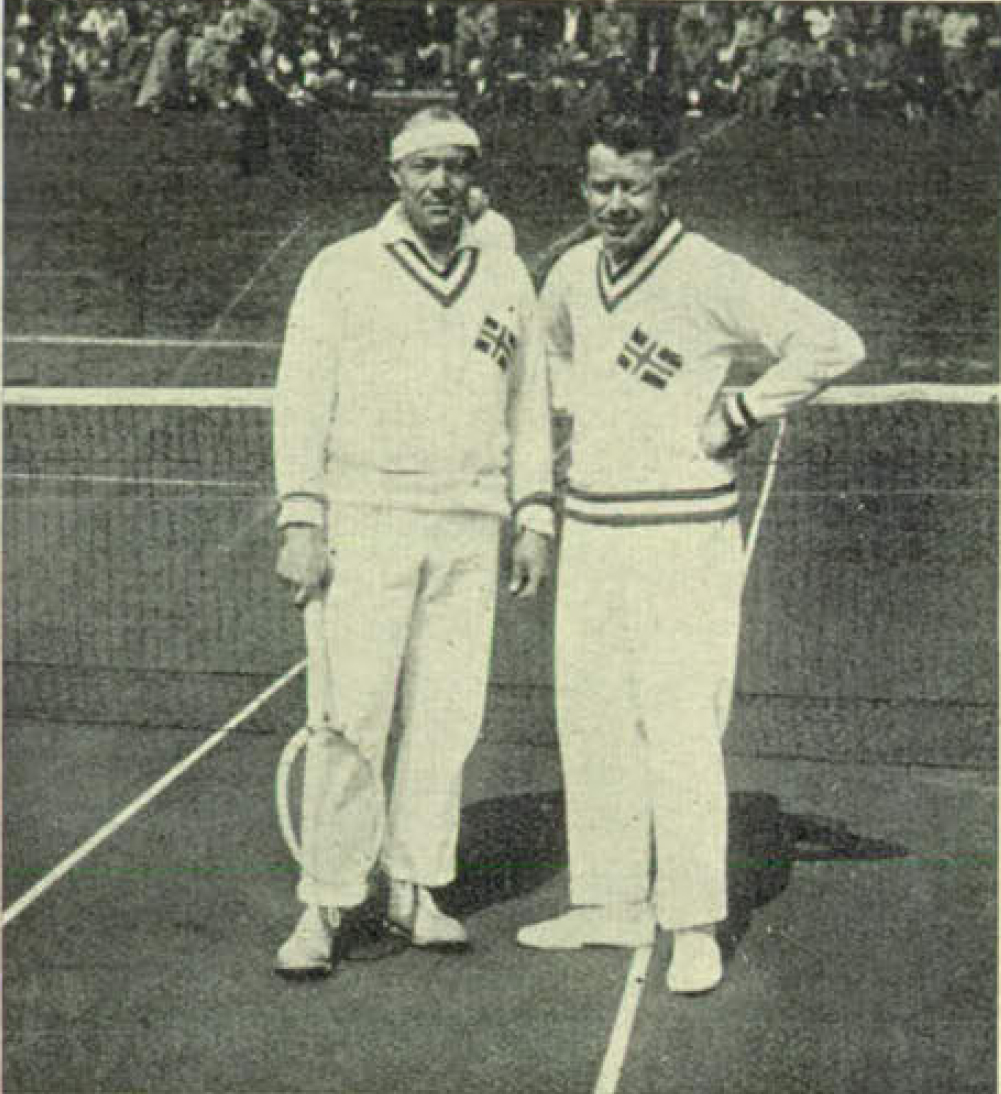
Torleif Torkildsen (left) and Jack Nielsen (right) the first ever Norwegian Davis Cup line-up

Norway competed in its first Davis Cup in 1928, with Torleif Torkildsen taking Norway's first win, at home in a 1–4 defeat to Hungary. Torkildsen was a main feature of Norway's side in the early seasons, with a 1–9 record between 1928 and 1932.

Norway was relegated to the qualifying rounds after 1933, but turned out their best result the following year, losing 2–3 in their third meeting with Hungary. Finn-Trygve Smith gave away a two-set lead in the first rubber, but Emil Gabori defeated Smith in the final rubber to win the game for Hungary. This also marked Johan Haanes' Davis Cup debut; Haanes registered a 6–23 record in a 17-year career interrupted by World War II, and only three Norwegian wins during his career was not due to Haanes.

Norway did not enter in 1935, but returned in 1936 with another 2–3 result against 1933 quarter-finalists Belgium at home. André Lacroix won all his three games for Belgium and prevented Norway's first tie victory.

The advances were temporary. Norway lost 15 successive rubbers up to 1939, and though they advanced to the quarter-final in 1939, that was only due to a forfeit from the invaded Czechoslovakia.

=== Never beyond the second round (1947–1972) ===
Norway did not enter the first Davis Cup after the war, but in 1947 Norway nearly eliminated New Zealand in their first ever match for eight years. Haanes and Jan Staubo both won a singles match each, but New Zealand turned the tables after four- and five-set victories in the final singles matches.

Haanes continued good form the following season, defeating Geoffrey Paish as Norway went down 1–4 to a Great Britain which would reach the semi-finals. Successive 0–5 defeats to a Lennart Bergelin-led Sweden team followed, before Johan Haanes won his final Davis Cup game in 1951. Adly El-Shafei won all his three games, though, and Egypt eliminated Norway.

In 1953, Norway achieved their first victory, with Nils-Erik Hessen, Rolf Pape and Finn Søhol defeating Luxembourg in Mondorf-les-Bains. All were mainstays in the side throughout the 1950s, and featured in Norway's 1954 win over Finland (3–2). Søhol also helped Norway defeat Israel by 4–1 in the 1956 tournament, which also gave the first win for Gunnar Sjøwall. However, five defeats followed, and it was not until Norway drew Portugal in 1963 and 1964 that they managed to win again. Norway went 9–1 on aggregate in these two clashes, with Søhol the only loser, and in the 1963 second round tie against Denmark Sjøwall defeated Jørgen Ulrich, a player who had reached the round of 16 at Wimbledon on two occasions. An 18-year-old Per Hegna also participated; he lost all his three games and didn't participate in the Davis Cup for ten years, but was to become a key player for Norway later.

Following the wins over Portugal, Norway struggled once more. They did manage a 4–1 win over Luxembourg in 1968, with Fridtjof Prydz (4 wins, 11 losses) winning both singles matches; doubles specialist Erik Melander (5 wins, 8 losses) had debuted the previous year in France, and the doubles team of Melander and Prydz got Norway's only win in the 1–4 loss to Israel in the 1971. Prydz and Jon-Erik Ross (2 wins, 11 losses) also defeated Egypt's doubles team in 1970.

=== First quarterfinal, and 80s struggles (1973–1988) ===
In 1973 Norway had to play preliminary qualifying matches for the first time since 1934. Hegna returned to Davis Cup play, and on an indoor court in Dublin Hegna, Melander, Finn-Dag Jagge and Thorvald Moe swept Ireland aside by 5–0 (though Melander and Moe had to play a 42-game set in the doubles match), and received a home first round clash with Denmark, where Hegna won both his singles matches and Norway eked out a 3–2 win. Norway reached the quarter-finals for the first time since 1939, where they failed to win a set in France and lost 30–92 in games. Hegna and Melander faced François Jauffret and Patrick Proisy, who had both reached the last four at Roland Garros and at the time both were ranked in the top 40, in the singles matches.

Nevertheless, Norway were not qualified for the main draw in the European Zone in 1974, and after Hegna and Thorvald Moe secured a 4–1 win over Iran they required to beat Spain in a play-off in Barcelona. Norway performed even worse than against France the previous year, winning only 26 of 116 games.

Then followed five preliminary round losses, with only Hegna able to secure solitary match wins in ties with Morocco and Netherlands. Hegna also won all three of his matches as Norway beat Turkey in 1980, but in the final qualifier against West Germany Norway won 18 games in four matches. Norway were thus two wins away for qualifying for the modern-day World Group, which was instituted in 1981. Instead, Norway remained in the European qualifying zone.

Hegna retired in 1981, only returning for a single dead rubber match in 1983, and in the seven years of one single European qualifying zone Norway only defeated Portugal on the tennis court, in 1984.

In 1986 Norway became the first European nation to lose to Nigeria, falling 0–5 in Lagos, and they were also the first European nation to lose to Senegal the following year. Three players debuted against Senegal; Bent Ove Pedersen and Audun Jensen lost the doubles match, while Anders Håseth played singles with one win and one loss.

As a result of the defeat to Senegal, Norway were assigned to Group Two of the Europe/Africa Zone when this was instituted in 1988. Norway reached the semi-final, losing to Ireland on grass in Belfast. The five-set doubles match became crucial, where Matt Doyle and Peter Wright won 6–4 in the final set, and Ireland went on to promote to Group One.

=== Ruud era (1989–2000) ===
Still in Group Two, Norway lost 2–3 to Luxembourg in 1989, the debut match of 16-year-old Christian Ruud, who along with Pedersen would form the basis of the team in the 1990s. The following year Norway reached a promotion play-off to Poland, where they lost after Ruud and Pedersen failed to win any singles matches, though Anders Rolfsen won a doubles match as part of a streak of six successive doubles match wins before he and Pedersen lost in straight sets to Poland in the 1992 relegation play-off, which Norway still won. The streak was part of Norway's 13–2 season in the 1991 Davis Cup, where they promoted from Division One after defeating Luxembourg in the play-off, but they lost to Finland in their first Group One match in 1992 and needed the play-off to survive.

A similar story unfolded in the 1993 season; brothers Byron and Wayne Black from Zimbabwe swept through 4–1 in Riksanlegget for tennis at Hasle, with only Pedersen winning a match, and Norway required a win in Helsinki. Ruud came up with a straight sets win over Tuomas Ketola as Norway got revenge for their 1992 defeat, won 3–2, and survived for another year.

The 1994 Davis Cup saw Ruud win both his singles matches, including a five-setter against world No. 6 Goran Ivanišević. However, Ruud and Pedersen couldn't win the doubles match, and the number two singles players weren't good enough against Ivanišević and Saša Hiršzon (world No. 250).

In 1995 Norway won their first round tie for the first time in four attempts; against Israel, newly relegated from the World Group, Ruud defeated Eyal Ran and Gilad Bloom, both top-200 players. The win qualified Norway for a World Group play-off match with Belgium, but Dick Norman and Johan Van Herck were too strong, and won 5–0 at Hasle, only conceding one set.

Norway were relegated the following year, as world No. 31 Andrei Medvedev won both singles matches and Ukraine took a 4–1 win in Kyiv. They spent the following years promoting and relegating alternatively; a play-off win over Portugal in Porto was followed by defeats to Romania and Croatia, in a match 19-year-old Ivan Ljubičić won all three matches and sent Norway down into Group Two.

=== Up and down with Andersen/Boretti (2000–07) ===
It took a further four years to be promoted to Group One again, as after the 3–2 win over Israel Norway lost the services of Ruud after 31 wins, the highest number by a Norwegian. Stian Boretti and Jan Frode Andersen nevertheless went through the 2002 season with wins over Egypt, Denmark and Ivory Coast, and Norway entered Group One for the sixth and thus far last time.

They were outmatched at that level, however. Andersen and Boretti nearly defeated Jürgen Melzer and Alexander Peya, who would five months later reach the final of the Austrian Open doubles tournament, at home in the first round match in February, coming back from two sets down to take it into a fifth, and Norway faced matches with Finland and Luxembourg to survive in Group One. However, the task was too much against top-200 players Jarkko Nieminen (Finland) and Gilles Müller (Luxembourg), and Norway were relegated.

From 2004 until 2006, Andersen and Boretti were the mainstay of the team, with only Boretti missing one match. Norway played eight matches during their four-year stay in Group Two, achieving a 3–5 record with wins over Ukraine, Monaco (in first of two relegation play-offs) and Zimbabwe. Boretti had to retire from a 2006 tie in Macedonia, where Norway were 1–2 down before the final day's singles matches, and Erling Tveit took Lazar Magdinčev into a fifth set. Magdinčev won 6–2, however, leaving the final match redundant as Norway failed to make the promotion play-off, which Macedonia later won. When Andersen retired before 2007, it prompted a historically poor performance from Norway, as they lost to Hungary at home before Lamine Ouahab of Algeria won his three matches and sent Norway down into Group Three of the Europe/Africa zone for the first time.

=== Among the weakest teams in Europe (2008–11) ===
Norway began their life in the zone's second lowest tier at the 2008 tournament, hosted in Armenia. Despite Boretti winning all his singles matches, Norway lost two rubbers, to Moldova and to Lithuania, the latter after 6–8 in the tie-breaker in the final doubles match. Norway thus finished third, just outside the promotion spot to Group Two.

On clay in Tunisia during the 2009 tournament, however, Norway had managed to secure the services of Erling Tveit, which helped to strengthen the side and secure promotion. Boretti and Tveit did nearly all the work, playing five singles and four doubles ties each, and despite a loss to Bosnia and Herzegovina, Norway won the final two matches over Tunisia and Morocco to secure promotion. It was Norway's first Davis Cup win over Morocco in three attempts, and both Moroccans were top 500 ATP players. Boretti won by only dropping a game and Tveit won 6–1 in the final set of the three-set encounters.

However, Norway dropped straight back after losses to Slovenia and Monaco; the latter team had no players in the top 400, but Norway still only won one set in the decisive three matches, and fell 0–5. In Group III the following year, Norway still fielded a team of Boretti and Tveit, though both players had now retired from the challenger tour. Norway's promotion hopes stopped one match before the play-off, losing to Turkey, who later promoted and had also been relegated from division II the previous year, after a final-set tie-break in the doubles match.

=== A new Ruud era (2015–) ===
Led by a 16 year old Casper Ruud and an 18 year old Viktor Durasovic Norway gained promotion from Group III up to Group II in 2015. The following years Norway have stayed in Group II, but they keep on working for the promotion. They are led by ATP Tour player Casper Ruud, the son of former player Christian Ruud. In March 2020, Norway qualified for the 2020 Davis Cup World Group I

In 2021 Norway beat Uzbekistan and Ukraine and qualified for the Davis Cup playoffs in 2022.

== Results and fixtures ==
The following are lists of match results and scheduled matches for the current year.

Win Loss Fixture

=== 2025 ===
2025 Davis Cup Qualifiers first round

Norway
2
Fjellhamar Arena, Fjellhamar, Norway
30–31 January 2025
Hard (i)

Argentina
3

			1	2	3
1	(Norway) (Argentina)	Nicolai Budkov Kjær; Tomás Martín Etcheverry	5; 7	6; 2	6^{5} 7^{7}
2	(Norway) (Argentina)	Casper Ruud; Mariano Navone	6; 3	6; 3
3	(Norway) (Argentina)	Viktor Durasovic / Casper Ruud; Andrés Molteni / Horacio Zeballos	2; 6	5; 7
4	(Norway) (Argentina)	Casper Ruud; Tomás Martín Etcheverry	6; 3	6; 3
5	(Norway) (Argentina)	Nicolai Budkov Kjær; Mariano Navone	6; 4	3; 6	4; 6

2025 Davis Cup World Group I

Chinese Taipei
2
Chinese Taipei
13–14 September 2025
Hard (i)

Norway
3

			1	2	3
1	(Chinese Taipei) (Norway)	Wu Tung-lin; Nicolai Budkov Kjær	6; 4	3; 6	4; 6
2	(Chinese Taipei) (Norway)	Tseng Chun-hsin; Viktor Durasovic	6; 1	6; 1
3	(Chinese Taipei) (Norway)	Ray Ho / Jason Jung; Lukas Hellum Lilleengen / Viktor Durasovic	7^{10} 6^{8}	6; 3
4	(Chinese Taipei) (Norway)	Tseng Chun-hsin; Nicolai Budkov Kjær	6^{2} 7^{7}	4; 6
5	(Chinese Taipei) (Norway)	Wu Tung-lin; Viktor Durasovic	6^{4} 7^{7}	7^{7} 6^{2}	4; 6

=== 2026 ===
2026 Davis Cup Qualifiers first round

Norway
0
Nadderud Arena, Oslo, Norway
5–6 February 2026
Hard (i)

Great Britain
4

			1	2	3
1	(Norway) (United Kingdom)	Viktor Durasovic; Jack Draper	2; 6	2; 6
2	(Norway) (United Kingdom)	Nicolai Budkov Kjær; Cameron Norrie	4; 6	4; 6
3	(Norway) (United Kingdom)	Nicolai Budkov Kjær / Viktor Durasovic; Julian Cash / Lloyd Glasspool	2; 6	6; 2	6^{5} 7^{7}
4	(Norway) (United Kingdom)	Nicolai Budkov Kjær; Jacob Fearnley	6; 3	3; 6	7; 10
5	(Norway) (United Kingdom)	Viktor Durasovic; Cameron Norrie				not played

2026 Davis Cup World Group I

Norway
4
Trondheim Spektrum
Trondheim, Norway
18–19 September 2026
Clay (i)

China
0

			1	2	3
1	(Norway) (China)	Casper Ruud; Te Rigele	6; 1	7^{7} 6^{1}
2	(Norway) (China)	Nicolai Budkov Kjær; Cui Jie	4; 6	6; 4	6; 4
3	(Norway) (China)	Nicolai Budkov Kjær / Viktor Durasovic; Te Rigele / Zhang Zhizhen	6^{5} 7^{7}	6; 4	7^{7} 6^{2}
4	(Norway) (China)	Casper Ruud; Fnu Nidunjianzan	6; 2	6; 0
5	(Norway) (China)	Nicolai Budkov Kjær; Te Rigele				not played

== Players ==
=== Current team (2022) ===
- Casper Ruud
- Viktor Durasovic
- Lukas Hellum Lilleengen
- Simen Sunde Bratholm
- Nicolai Budkov Kjær (Junior player)

=== Former players ===
Members of the Norway Davis Cup team that have played matches
Player	Caps	Win–loss overall			Debut		Last or most recent match		Ref.
Player	Caps	Singles	Doubles	Total	Date	Opponent	Date	Opponent	Ref.
Fredrik Aarum	3	0–3	0–0	0–3	5 May 2002	Egypt	9 February 2004	Austria	
Olav Abrahamsen	1	0–2	0–0	0–2	24 September 1977	Poland	26 September 1977	Poland	
Øyvind Alver	1	0–1	0–0	0–1	27 April 2001	Estonia	29 April 2001	Estonia	
Jan Frode Andersen	24	30–23	25–14	55–37	20 September 1996	Ukraine	23 July 2006	North Macedonia	
Birger Andersen-Brem	2	0–0	0–2	0–2	26 May 1939	Belgium	18 May 1946	New Zealand	
Peter August Anker	1	0–1	0–0	0–1	3 February 2018	Egypt	4 February 2018	Egypt	
Fredrik Ask	1	0–2	1–1	1–3	9 May 2008	Armenia	11 July 2010	Monaco	
Jens-Johan Beer	1	0–1	0–0	0–1	8 May 1937	France	10 May 1937	France	
Jarl Bibow	1	0–1	1–1	1–1	1 May 1964	Portugal	16 May 1965	South Africa	
Joachim Bjerke	1	3–4	6–0	9–4	14 May 2011	Andorra	17 July 2015	North Macedonia	
Dick Bjurstedt	1	0–2	0–0	0–2	8 May 1937	France	10 May 1937	France	
Stian Boretti	1	26–19	12–18	38–37	21 July 2000	Greece	6 April 2014	Monaco	
Simen Sunde Bratholm	1	1–2	0–2	1–4	3 February 2017	Latvia	5 March 2022	Kazakhstan	
Rolf Christoffersen	1	0–2	0–3	0–5	4 May 1928	Hungary	15 May 1931	Poland	
Viktor Durasovic	17	11–10	5–8	16–18	2 February 2014	Lithuania	17 September 2022	India	
Nils Elvik	5	1–8	0–2	1–10	14 May 1965	South Africa	26 May 1968	Romania	
Oscar Fagerstrøm	1	0–1	0–0	0–1	13 May 1931	Poland	15 May 1931	Poland	
Ragnar Felix	1	0–1	0–0	0–1	8 February 1980	West Germany	10 February 1980	West Germany	
Adrian Forberg Skogeng	1	0–1	0–0	0–1	9 July 2010	Monaco	11 July 2010	Monaco	
Sjur-Lars Galtung-Hansen	3	0–3	0–2	0–5	4 May 1962	Poland	11 May 1969	Austria	
Johan Haanes	10	5–14	1–9	6–23	7 May 1932	Monaco	11 May 1951	Egypt	
Thorgny Haanes	1	0–2	0–1	0–3	19 May 1950	Sweden	21 May 1950	Sweden	
Ragnar Hagen	3	0–4	0–2	0–6	5 May 1932	Monaco	20 August 1933	Yugoslavia	
Anders Håseth	3	9–7	0–0	9–7	8 May 1987	Senegal	27 March 1994	Croatia	
Thomas Haug	3	0–1	0–0	0–1	11 July 2003	Finland	13 July 2003	Finland	
Per Hegna	17	12–19	3–6	15–25	4 May 1962	Poland	12 June 1983	Austria	
Lukas Hellum Lilleengen	1	1–0	0–0	1–0	6 March 2020	Barbados	7 March 2020	Barbados	
Nils-Erik Hesen	7	1–12	2–6	3–18	13 May 1949	Sweden	13 May 1956	Sweden	
Thomas Heyerdahl	1	1–0	0–0	1–0	2 May 1997	Nigeria	4 May 1997	Nigeria	
Lars Hjarrand	2	1–1	0–0	1–1	3 April 1998	Romania	2 May 1999	Turkey	
Finn-Dag Jagge	12	1–11	2–8	3–19	6 May 1955	South Africa	15 April 1973	Ireland	
Audun Jensen	5	2–3	2–1	4–4	9 May 1986	Nigeria	12 June 1988	Ireland	
Fritz Jenssen	3	1–5	0–3	1–8	14 May 1936	Belgium	22 May 1938	Germany	
Tony Jonsson	5	2–8	0–0	2–8	10 June 1983	Austria	11 May 1986	Nigeria	
Helge Koll-Frafjord	18	5–12	4–7	9–19	30 April 1993	Finland	18 July 2004	Hungary	
Sverre Lie	3	0–3	0–2	0–5	9 May 1951	Egypt	19 May 1953	Great Britain	
Erik Melander	7	2–5	3–3	5–8	4 May 1967	France	20 May 1973	France	
Thorvald Moe	7	2–6	3–4	5–10	29 April 1960	Netherlands	5 May 1974	Spain	
Jan Munch-Soegaard	3	0–1	1–2	1–3	24 September 1976	Poland	10 February 1980	West Germany	
Bjørn Naume	1	0–1	0–0	0–1	8 May 1981	Ireland	10 May 1981	Ireland	
Jack Nielsen	1	0–7	0–5	0–7	10 May 1929	Hungary	15 May 1931	Poland	
Rolf Pape	1	3–6	2–2	5–8	1 May 1953	Luxembourg	3 May 1959	South Africa	
Bent-Ove Pedersen	1	14–6	8–7	22–13	8 May 1987	Senegal	18 July 1999	Morocco	
Gisle Pedersen-Jentoft	1	0–1	0–1	0–2	7 May 1982	Yugoslavia	9 May 1982	Yugoslavia	
Terje Persson	1	0–1	1–2	1–3	10 June 1983	Austria	17 June 1984	Austria	
Frithjof Prydz	1	2–8	2–3	4–11	3 May 1968	Luxembourg	17 September 1979	Netherlands	
Arne-Georg Raabe	1	0–1	1–0	1–1	15 June 1990	Morocco	5 May 1991	Bulgaria	
Edvard Raastad	1	0–2	0–0	0–2	4 May 1967	France	6 May 1967	France	
Thomas Randby	1	2–2	0–0	2–2	14 September 1979	Turkey	10 May 1981	Ireland	
Philip Riise-Hansen	2	2–3	1–1	3–4	6 April 2007	Hungary	11 May 2008	Bosnia and Herzegovina	
Sigurd Rinde	1	0–2	0–0	0–2	26 May 1939	Belgium	28 May 1939	Belgium	
Anders Rolfsen	1	0–0	6–1	6–1	4 May 1990	Monaco	3 May 1992	Poland	
Morten Ronneberg	5	2–5	1–3	3–8	7 May 1982	Yugoslavia	12 May 1985	Greece	
Helge Rosjø	1	1–0	1–0	2–0	30 April 1999	Turkey	2 May 1999	Turkey	
Jon-Erik Rustad	1	2–7	2–3	4–10	3 May 1968	Luxembourg	6 May 1973	Denmark	
Casper Ruud	14	18–4	5–5	23–9	16 July 2015	Armenia	17 September 2022	India	
Christian Ruud	12	24–15	7–8	31–23	5 May 1989	Luxembourg	30 April 2000	Israel	
Gunnar Sjøwall	11	7–12	1–6	8–18	6 May 1955	South Africa	1 May 1966	West Germany	
Frederik Sletting-Johnsen	6	2–2	1–4	3–6	6 April 2007	Hungary	11 May 2008	Bosnia and Herzegovina	
Finn-Trygve Smith	4	0–6	1–1	1–7	5 May 1932	Monaco	5 August 1934	Hungary	
Finn Søhol	8	9–5	0–2	9–7	1 May 1953	Luxembourg	3 May 1964	Portugal	
Jan Staubo	4	2–6	0–2	2–8	16 May 1947	New Zealand	11 May 1951	Egypt	
Øystein Steiro	3	3–0	0–0	3–0	14 May 2011	Andorra	17 July 2015	North Macedonia	
Carl Sundberg	4	2–0	2–0	4–0	7 April 2006	Zimbabwe	3 May 2012	Malta	
Frederick Sundsten	2	0–1	0–1	0–2	9 April 2004	Ukraine	18 July 2004	Hungary	
Jan Svensen	1	0–1	0–2	0–3	7 May 1982	Yugoslavia	9 May 1982	Yugoslavia	
Marius Tangen	1	0–1	0–0	0–1	4 March 2005	Ukraine	6 March 2005	Ukraine	
Torleif Torkildsen	5	1–7	0–2	1–9	4 May 1928	Hungary	7 May 1932	Monaco	
Erling Tveit	21	9–9	7–7	16–16	19 September 2003	Luxembourg	6 April 2004	Monaco	
Erik Ulleberg	3	0–4	0–3	0–7	13 September 1974	Belgium	18 September 1977	Morocco	

== See also ==
- Davis Cup
- Norway Billie Jean King Cup team
