= Lukas Hellum Lilleengen =

Norwegian tennis player

- Country (sports): Norway
- Residence: Oslo, Norway
- Born: 15 November 2000 (age 25) Meyrin, Switzerland
- Height: 1.80 m (5 ft 11 in)
- Plays: Right-handed (two-handed backhand)
- Prize money: US $44,283

Singles
- Career record: 1–1
- Career titles: 0
- Highest ranking: No. 1,089 (29 August 2022)
- Current ranking: No. 1,940 (9 February 2026)

Doubles
- Career record: 0–2
- Career titles: 0
- Highest ranking: No. 364 (27 October 2025)
- Current ranking: No. 453 (9 February 2026)
- Last updated on: 9 February 2026.

Lukas Hellum Lilleengen (born 15 November 2000) is a Norwegian professional tennis player. He has a career-high ATP singles ranking of No. 1,089 achieved on 29 August 2022 and a best doubles ranking of No. 364, reached on 27 October 2025.

Hellum Lilleengen represents Norway at the Davis Cup, where he has a W/L record of 1–1.

== ITF World Tennis Tour finals ==
=== Doubles: 5 (2 titles, 3 runner-ups) ===
| Legend ITF WTT (2–3) | Finals by surface Hard (1–2) Clay (1–1) |

| Result | W–L | Date | Tournament | Tier | Surface | Partner | Opponents | Score |
|---|---|---|---|---|---|---|---|---|
| Loss | 0–1 | Mar 2019 | M15 Oslo, Norway | WTT | Hard (i) | (Norway) Jakob Grøner | (Switzerland) Yannik Steinegger (Switzerland) Jakub Paul | 4–6, 1–6 |
| Win | 1–1 | May 2024 | M25 Värnamo, Sweden | WTT | Clay | (Norway) Viktor Durasovic | (Sweden) Henrik Bladelius (Sweden) Filip Gustafsson | 7–5, 6–3 |
| Loss | 1–2 | Jul 2024 | M25 Roehampton, UK | WTT | Hard | (Norway) Viktor Durasovic | (Australia) Joshua Charlton (United Kingdom) Harry Wendelken | 6–3, 6–7^{(1–7)}, [9–11] |
| Win | 2–2 | Oct 2024 | M25 Glasgow, UK | WTT | Hard (i) | (Norway) Viktor Durasovic | (United Kingdom) Alexis Canter (United Kingdom) Marcus Walters | 6–7^{(5–7)}, 6–2, [10–4] |
| Loss | 2–3 | Jul 2025 | M25 Uriage-les-Bains, France | WTT | Clay | (France) Max Westphal | (France) Lenny Couturier (France) Timeo Trufelli | 3–6, 6–3, [8–10] |
