= Tennis Association of Bosnia and Herzegovina =

- Sport: Tennis
- Jurisdiction: National
- Abbreviation: (CTA)
- Founded: 1996
- Affiliation: International Tennis Federation
- Regional affiliation: Tennis Europe
- Location: Sarajevo
- President: Miodrag Marković
- Secretary: Senad Hadžimešić

Official website
- www.tsbih.ba
- (Bosnia and Herzegovina)

The Tennis Association of Bosnia and Herzegovina (Teniski savez Bosne i Hercegovine / Тениски савез Босне и Херцеговине) is the governing body of tennis in Bosnia and Herzegovina. It organizes Bosnia and Herzegovina's teams in the Davis Cup and the Fed Cup.

It also organizes and helps to coordinate local tournaments and produces a national ranking list of players. The association currently oversees 75 tennis clubs.

The CTA was formed in 1996. However, the first tennis association in Bosnia and Herzegovina dates back to 1922. It is a member of the International Tennis Federation.

== See also ==
- Davis Cup
- Fed Cup
- Bosnia and Herzegovina Davis Cup team
- Bosnia and Herzegovina Fed Cup team
