= Fredrik Ask =

Norwegian tennis player

- Country (sports): Norway
- Residence: Oslo, Norway
- Born: 5 September 1990 (age 34); Oslo, Norway
- Plays: Left-handed (two-handed backhand)
- College: University of Arizona
- Prize money: $6,468

Singles
- Career record: 0–2 (at ATP Tour level, Grand Slam level, and in Davis Cup)
- Career titles: 0 ITF
- Highest ranking: No. 1251 (18 October 2010)

Doubles
- Career record: 1–1 (at ATP Tour level, Grand Slam level, and in Davis Cup)
- Career titles: 1 ITF
- Highest ranking: No. 800 (23 October 2017)
- Last updated on: 14:06, 30 October 2021 (UTC).

Fredrik Ask (born 5 September 1990) is a Norwegian former tennis player and padel player.

Ask played college tennis at the University of Arizona.

Ask has a career high ATP singles ranking of 1251 achieved on 18 October 2010 and his career high ATP doubles ranking of 800 was achieved on 23 October 2017.

Ask represented Norway at the Davis Cup where he has a W/L record of 1–3.

== Career Finals ==
=== Doubles (1-1) ===
Legend
Grand Slam (0)
ATP Masters Series (0)
ATP Tour (0)
Challengers (0)
ITF Futures (1–1)

Outcome	Date	Tournament	Surface	Partner	Opponent	Score
Winner	20 November 2016	Nicosia, Cyprus	Hard	(Belgium) Omar Salman	(Austria) Pascal Brunner (Austria) Lucas Miedler	4–6, 7–5, 10–8
Runner-up	25 June 2017	Gdynia, Poland	Clay	(Sweden) André Göransson	(Bolivia) Boris Arias (United States) Nick Chappell	1–6, 1–6
