= Erling Tveit =

Norwegian tennis player

Erling L'Orsa Tveit
- Country (sports): Norway
- Born: 28 December 1984 (age 40); Oslo, Norway
- Height: 6 ft 3 in (1.91 m)
- Turned pro: 2009
- Plays: Left-handed
- College: University of Mississippi
- Prize money: $26,235

Singles
- Career record: 9–10 (ATP Tour and Davis Cup)
- Highest ranking: No. 484 (27 Sep 2010)

Doubles
- Career record: 7–7 (Davis Cup)
- Highest ranking: No. 713 (22 Mar 2010)

Erling L'Orsa Tveit (born 28 December 1984) is a former tennis player from Norway.

== Tennis career ==
Tveit played collegiate tennis for the University of Mississippi before turning professional, earning All-American honours for singles and doubles in both 2006 and 2007.

Tveit made his debut for the Norway Davis Cup team in 2003 against Luxembourg. He had a 10-year Davis Cup career and won 9 of the 18 singles matches and 7 of the 14 doubles matches that he played. His one ATP tour main draw appearance was at the 2007 Swedish Open, when he lost in the first round to Fernando Verdasco.

Tveit mainly participated on the ATP Challenger Tour and the Futures circuit. He had a career best singles ranking of 484 on the professional tour and a best doubles ranking of 713, winning three ITF Futures doubles tournaments.

== ITF Futures titles ==
=== Doubles: (3) ===
No.	Date	Tournament	Tier	Surface	Partner	Opponents	Score
1.	Jun 2007	Norway F1, Gausdal	Futures	Hard	(Norway) Stian Boretti	(Denmark) Jacob Melskens (Denmark) Rasmus Nørby	6–4, 6–4
2.	Sep 2009	USA F23, Costa Mesa	Futures	Hard	(United States) Robbye Poole	(United States) Will Gray (United States) Blake Strode	6–2, 7–5
3.	Nov 2010	USA F29, Niceville	Futures	Clay	(United States) Robbye Poole	(United States) Andrea Collarini (United States) Denis Kudla	7–6^{(7–4)}, 6–2

== See also ==
- Norwegian Davis Cup players
