= Ergün Zorlu =

Turkish tennis player

- Country (sports): Turkey
- Residence: Istanbul, Turkey
- Born: February 3, 1985 (age 40)
- Height: 6 ft 1 in (185 cm)
- Turned pro: 21 July 2003
- Plays: Right-handed
- Prize money: $12,287

Singles
- Career record: 0-2
- Career titles: 0
- Highest ranking: No.795 (12 September 2011)
- Current ranking: No.795(12 September 2011)

Grand Slam singles results
- Australian Open: -
- French Open: -
- Wimbledon: -
- US Open: -

Doubles
- Career record: 0-1
- Highest ranking: No.742 (23 April 2007)

Ergün Zorlu is a Turkish tennis player. He reached the final of the 2009 ITF Men's Turkey F7 Future Cup, losing to Marco Simoni 6–4, 6–2. Later, he joined in the Turkey F8 Futures, losing 1–2 in the first round to Timo Nieminen.

== Singles Finals ==
Legend (singles)
Grand Slam (0)
Tennis Masters Cup (0)
ATP Masters Series (0)
ATP Tour (0)
Challengers (0)
Futures (1)

No.	Date	Tournament	Surface	Opponent in the final	Score
1.	2009	(Turkey) Ankara	Clay	(Italy) Marco Simoni	6–4, 6–2
