= Stian Boretti =

Norwegian tennis player

- Country (sports): Norway
- Born: 20 December 1981 (age 43); Nesodden, Norway
- Height: 6 ft 2 in (188 cm)
- Plays: Right-handed
- Prize money: $45,065

Singles
- Career record: 26–19 (Davis Cup)
- Highest ranking: No. 375 (10 Jul 2006)

Doubles
- Career record: 12–18 (Davis Cup)
- Highest ranking: No. 511 (17 Oct 2005)

Stian Boretti (born 20 December 1981) is a Norwegian former professional tennis player.

Born in Nesodden, Boretti had a career best singles ranking of 375 on the professional tour, winning six ITF Futures singles titles. He had a best doubles ranking of 511 and won five ITF Futures doubles tournaments.

Boretti, a five-time King's Cup winner, is the Norwegian record holder for Davis Cup appearances. His Davis Cup career spanned 15-years, between 2000 and 2014, with 26 singles and 12 doubles wins, from 39 ties.
