= Turkey Davis Cup team =

Turkish national tennis team

Turkey
- Association: Turkish Tennis Federation
- Nations Ranking: 33
- Colors: Red & White
- First year: 1948

The Turkey men's national tennis team represents Turkey in Davis Cup tennis competition and are governed by the Turkish Tennis Federation.

Turkey currently compete in the Europe/Africa Zone of Group I. They have raised, again second time, the Group I Feb 2023.

== History ==
Turkey competed in its first Davis Cup in 1948.

== Current team (2023) ==
- Altuğ Çelikbilek
- Cem Ilkel
- Ergi Kırkın
- Yankı Erel
- Alaattin Bora Gerçeker (Captain-player)

== See also ==
- Davis Cup
- Turkey Billie Jean King Cup team
