= 2001 Davis Cup Europe/Africa Zone Group II =

International tennis competition

The Europe/Africa Zone was one of the three zones of the regional Davis Cup competition in 2001.

In the Europe/Africa Zone there were four different tiers, called groups, in which teams competed against each other to advance to the upper tier. Winners in Group II advanced to the Europe/Africa Zone Group I. Teams who lost their respective ties competed in the relegation play-offs, with winning teams remaining in Group II, whereas teams who lost their play-offs were relegated to the Europe/Africa Zone Group III in 2002.

== Participating nations ==
- Armenia
- Denmark
- Estonia
- Greece
- Hungary
- Ireland
- Israel
- Ivory Coast
- Luxembourg
- Moldova
- Monaco
- Norway
- Poland
- South Africa
- Turkey
- Yugoslavia

=== Draw ===
Relegation Play-offs
Roquebrune-Cap-Martin, France (clay)
Monaco | 1
Ireland | 4
Chișinău, Moldova (clay)
Turkey | 2
Moldova | 3
Abidjan, Ivory Coast (hard)
Estonia | 2
Ivory Coast | 3
Belgrade, Yugoslavia (clay)
Poland | 2
Yugoslavia | 3

First Round
Szeged, Hungary (clay)
Hungary | 5
Monaco | 0
Dublin, Ireland (indoor carpet)
Ireland | 2
Denmark | 3
Istanbul, Turkey (hard)
Greece | 5
Turkey | 0
Chișinău, Moldova (indoor carpet)
Armenia | 3
Moldova | 2
Tallinn, Estonia (indoor carpet)
Norway | 3
Estonia | 2
Esch-sur-Alzette, Lux. (indoor carpet)
Luxembourg | 3
Ivory Coast | 2
Bytom, Poland (clay)
Poland | 2
Israel | 3
Nelspruit, South Africa (hard)
Yugoslavia | 0
South Africa | 5

Second Round
Skagen, Denmark (hard)
Hungary | 2
Denmark | 3
Athens, Greece (clay)
Greece | 5
Armenia | 0
Mondorf-les-Bains, Luxembourg (clay)
Norway | 2
Luxembourg | 3
Ramat HaSharon, Israel (hard)
Israel | 3
South Africa | 2

Third Round
Athens, Greece (clay)
Denmark | 2
Greece | 3
Mondorf-les-Bains, Luxembourg (clay)
Luxembourg | 1
Israel | 4

- Monaco, Turkey, Estonia, and Poland relegated to Group III in 2002.
- Greece and Israel promoted to Group I in 2002.

== First round ==
=== Hungary vs. Monaco ===
Hungary
5
Gellért Szabadidőközpont, Szeged, Hungary
27–29 April 2001
Clay

Monaco
0

| | | | 1 | 2 | 3 | 4 | 5 |
|---|---|---|---|---|---|---|---|
| 1 | (Hungary) (Monaco) | Gergely Kisgyörgy; Christophe Bosio | 6; 2 | 6; 1 | 6; 3 |
| 2 | (Hungary) (Monaco) | Attila Sávolt; Emmanuel Heussner | 7^{7} 6^{4} | 6^{8} 7^{10} | 6; 4 | 6; 4 |
| 3 | (Hungary) (Monaco) | Gábor Köves / Attila Sávolt; Christophe Bosio / Emmanuel Heussner | 6; 2 | 6; 3 | 6; 4 |
| 4 | (Hungary) (Monaco) | Attila Sávolt; Christophe Bosio | 6; 2 | 6; 1 |
| 5 | (Hungary) (Monaco) | Gergely Kisgyörgy; Emmanuel Heussner | 7^{12} 6^{10} | 6; 4 |

=== Ireland vs. Denmark ===
Ireland
2
Riverview Club, Dublin, Ireland
27–29 April 2001
Carpet (indoors)

Denmark
3

| | | | 1 | 2 | 3 | 4 | 5 |
|---|---|---|---|---|---|---|---|
| 1 | (Republic of Ireland) (Denmark) | John Doran; Jonathan Printzlau | 6; 1 | 7^{7} 6^{5} | 6^{5} 7^{7} | 6; 4 |
| 2 | (Republic of Ireland) (Denmark) | Peter Clarke; Kristian Pless | 4; 6 | 4; 6 | 4; 6 |
| 3 | (Republic of Ireland) (Denmark) | Owen Casey / John Doran; Kristian Pless / Jonathan Printzlau | 6; 2 | 5; 7 | 3; 6 | 7^{7} 6^{1} | 1; 6 |
| 4 | (Republic of Ireland) (Denmark) | John Doran; Kristian Pless | 5; 7 | 3; 6 | 6; 1 | 3; 6 |
| 5 | (Republic of Ireland) (Denmark) | Peter Clarke; Mads Gottlieb | 7^{9} 6^{7} | 6; 2 |

=== Turkey vs. Greece ===
Turkey
0
E.N.K.A. Sports Club, Istanbul, Turkey
27–29 April 2001
Hard

Greece
5

| | | | 1 | 2 | 3 | 4 | 5 |
|---|---|---|---|---|---|---|---|
| 1 | (Turkey) (Greece) | Mustafa Azkara; Solon Peppas | 4; 6 | 4; 6 | 4; 6 |
| 2 | (Turkey) (Greece) | Efe Üstündağ; Vasilis Mazarakis | 2; 6 | 6; 4 | 4; 6 | 1; 6 |
| 3 | (Turkey) (Greece) | Mustafa Azkara / Efe Üstündağ; Konstantinos Economidis / Anastasios Vasiliadis | 4; 6 | 6^{6} 7^{8} | 6^{5} 7^{7} |
| 4 | (Turkey) (Greece) | Esat Tanık; Vasilis Mazarakis | 1; 6 | 4; 6 |
| 5 | (Turkey) (Greece) | Barış Ergün; Solon Peppas | 5; 7 | 6^{1} 7^{7} |

=== Moldova vs. Armenia ===
Moldova
2
National Centre, Chișinău, Moldova
27–29 April 2001
Carpet (indoors)

Armenia
3

| | | | 1 | 2 | 3 | 4 | 5 |
|---|---|---|---|---|---|---|---|
| 1 | (Moldova) (Armenia) | Victor Ribas; Tsolak Gevorgyan | 1; 6 | 4; 6 | 3; 6 |
| 2 | (Moldova) (Armenia) | Iurie Gorban; Sargis Sargsian | 1; 6 | 2; 6 | 2; 6 |
| 3 | (Moldova) (Armenia) | Sergei Cupțov / Andrei Gorban; Tsolak Gevorgyan / Sargis Sargsian | 0; 6 | 2; 6 | 4; 6 |
| 4 | (Moldova) (Armenia) | Andrei Gorban; Tigran Martirosyan | 7; 5 | 4; 6 | 6; 2 |
| 5 | (Moldova) (Armenia) | Sergei Cupțov; Davit Babayan | 6; 4 | 6; 4 |

=== Estonia vs. Norway ===
Estonia
2
Kalev Sports Hall, Tallinn, Estonia
27–29 April 2001
Carpet (indoors)

Norway
3

| | | | 1 | 2 | 3 | 4 | 5 |
|---|---|---|---|---|---|---|---|
| 1 | (Estonia) (Norway) | Mait Künnap; Helge Koll-Frafjord | 6^{3} 7^{7} | 6^{5} 7^{7} | 3; 6 |
| 2 | (Estonia) (Norway) | Andrei Luzgin; Jan Frode Andersen | 6^{5} 7^{7} | 6^{5} 7^{7} | 6^{5} 7^{7} |
| 3 | (Estonia) (Norway) | Mait Künnap / Alti Vahkal; Øyvind Alver / Helge Koll-Frafjord | 6; 0 | 7; 5 | 7^{7} 6^{4} |
| 4 | (Estonia) (Norway) | Alti Vahkal; Jan Frode Andersen | 6; 4 | 6^{2} 7^{7} | 6; 3 | 7^{7} 6^{3} |
| 5 | (Estonia) (Norway) | Andrei Luzgin; Helge Koll-Frafjord | 1; 6 | 3; 6 | 7^{7} 6^{1} | 2; 6 |

=== Luxembourg vs. Ivory Coast ===
Luxembourg
3
Centre National de Tennis, Esch-sur-Alzette, Luxembourg
27–29 April 2001
Carpet (indoors)

Ivory Coast
2

| | | | 1 | 2 | 3 | 4 | 5 |
|---|---|---|---|---|---|---|---|
| 1 | (Luxembourg) (Ivory Coast) | Mike Scheidweiler; Claude N'Goran | 2; 6 | 4; 6 | 6; 3 | 3; 6 |
| 2 | (Luxembourg) (Ivory Coast) | Gilles Müller; Valentin Sanon | 7^{11} 6^{9} | 6; 4 | 6; 1 |
| 3 | (Luxembourg) (Ivory Coast) | Gilles Müller / Mike Scheidweiler; Ilou Lonfo / Claude N'Goran | 7^{7} 6^{5} | 6; 4 | 6; 4 |
| 4 | (Luxembourg) (Ivory Coast) | Mike Scheidweiler; Valentin Sanon | 6; 3 | 6; 1 | 4; 6 | 6; 3 |
| 5 | (Luxembourg) (Ivory Coast) | Gilles Müller; Claude N'Goran | 5; 7 | 6; 4 | 6^{5} 7^{7} |

=== Poland vs. Israel ===
Poland
2
Górnik Sports Club, Bytom, Poland
27–29 April 2001
Clay

Israel
3

| | | | 1 | 2 | 3 | 4 | 5 |
|---|---|---|---|---|---|---|---|
| 1 | (Poland) (Israel) | Łukasz Kubot; Noam Okun | 2; 6 | 3; 6 | 2; 6 |
| 2 | (Poland) (Israel) | Bartłomiej Dąbrowski; Harel Levy | 6^{3} 7^{7} | 2; 6 | 7^{7} 6^{2} | 6; 1 | 5; 7 |
| 3 | (Poland) (Israel) | Filip Anioła / Mariusz Fyrstenberg; Harel Levy / Noam Okun | 2; 6 | 2; 6 | 4; 6 |
| 4 | (Poland) (Israel) | Łukasz Kubot; Amir Hadad | 7^{7} 6^{3} | 6; 4 |
| 5 | (Poland) (Israel) | Bartłomiej Dąbrowski; Noam Behr | 6; 2 | 3; 6 | 6; 3 |

=== South Africa vs. Yugoslavia ===
South Africa
5
Nelspruit Tennis Club, Nelspruit, South Africa
27–29 April 2001
Hard

Yugoslavia
0

| | | | 1 | 2 | 3 | 4 | 5 |
|---|---|---|---|---|---|---|---|
| 1 | (South Africa) (Federal Republic of Yugoslavia) | Wayne Ferreira; Dušan Vemić | 3; 6 | 6; 3 | 6; 3 | 6; 1 |
| 2 | (South Africa) (Federal Republic of Yugoslavia) | Neville Godwin; Nenad Zimonjić | 4; 6 | 4; 6 | 6; 2 | 6; 1 | 6; 2 |
| 3 | (South Africa) (Federal Republic of Yugoslavia) | Wayne Ferreira / Neville Godwin; Dušan Vemić / Nenad Zimonjić | 7^{7} 6^{3} | 7^{7} 6^{2} | 4; 6 | 6; 4 |
| 4 | (South Africa) (Federal Republic of Yugoslavia) | Wayne Ferreira; Nenad Zimonjić | 6; 3 | 6^{2} 7^{7} | 6; 2 |
| 5 | (South Africa) (Federal Republic of Yugoslavia) | Justin Bower; Janko Tipsarević | 6; 1 | 7^{9} 6^{7} |

== Second round ==
=== Denmark vs. Hungary ===
Denmark
3
Skagen Tennis Club, Skagen, Denmark
20–22 July 2001
Hard

Hungary
2

| | | | 1 | 2 | 3 | 4 | 5 |
|---|---|---|---|---|---|---|---|
| 1 | (Denmark) (Hungary) | Patrik Langvardt; Gergely Kisgyörgy | 7^{7} 6^{4} | 3; 6 | 7; 5 | 4; 6 | 4; 6 |
| 2 | (Denmark) (Hungary) | Kristian Pless; Kornél Bardóczky | 6; 3 | 6; 1 | 6^{2} 7^{7} | 6; 3 |
| 3 | (Denmark) (Hungary) | Kristian Pless / Jonathan Printzlau; Gergely Kisgyörgy / Gábor Köves | 6^{5} 7^{7} | 7^{8} 6^{6} | 6; 1 | 4; 6 | 4; 6 |
| 4 | (Denmark) (Hungary) | Kristian Pless; Gergely Kisgyörgy | 7^{7} 6^{4} | 6; 4 | 6; 2 |
| 5 | (Denmark) (Hungary) | Jonathan Printzlau; Kornél Bardóczky | 6^{2} 7^{7} | 7^{7} 6^{3} | 7^{9} 6^{7} | 6; 1 |

=== Greece vs. Armenia ===
Greece
5
Athens Lawn Tennis Club, Athens, Greece
20–22 July 2001
Clay

Armenia
0

| | | | 1 | 2 | 3 | 4 | 5 |
|---|---|---|---|---|---|---|---|
| 1 | (Greece) (Armenia) | Solon Peppas; Tsolak Gevorgyan | 6; 1 | 6; 2 | 6; 2 |
| 2 | (Greece) (Armenia) | Konstantinos Economidis; Sargis Sargsian | 4; 6 | 6; 4 | 6; 4 | 6; 2 |
| 3 | (Greece) (Armenia) | Konstantinos Economidis / Anastasios Vasiliadis; Tsolak Gevorgyan / Sargis Sargsian | 4; 6 | 6; 4 | 6; 4 | 6; 2 |
| 4 | (Greece) (Armenia) | Nikos Rovas; Tigran Martirosyan | 6; 1 | 6; 3 |
| 5 | (Greece) (Armenia) | Konstantinos Economidis; Tsolak Gevorgyan | 6; 1 | 6; 4 |

=== Luxembourg vs. Norway ===
Luxembourg
3
Mondorf Tennis Club, Mondorf-les-Bains, Luxembourg
20–22 July 2001
Clay

Norway
2

| | | | 1 | 2 | 3 | 4 | 5 |
|---|---|---|---|---|---|---|---|
| 1 | (Luxembourg) (Norway) | Gilles Müller; Stian Boretti | 6; 2 | 6; 3 | 3; 6 | 7^{7} 6^{4} |
| 2 | (Luxembourg) (Norway) | Gilles Kremer; Jan Frode Andersen | 2; 6 | 0; 6 | 1; 6 |
| 3 | (Luxembourg) (Norway) | Gilles Müller / Mike Scheidweiler; Jan Frode Andersen / Stian Boretti | 6; 1 | 3; 6 | 4; 6 | 6; 2 | 6; 3 |
| 4 | (Luxembourg) (Norway) | Gilles Müller; Jan Frode Andersen | 4; 6 | 0; 6 | 3; 6 |
| 5 | (Luxembourg) (Norway) | Mike Scheidweiler; Stian Boretti | 6^{4} 7^{7} | 6; 3 | 6; 1 | 5; 7 | 6; 3 |

=== Israel vs. South Africa ===
Israel
3
Canada Stadium, Ramat HaSharon, Israel
20–22 July 2001
Hard

South Africa
2

| | | | 1 | 2 | 3 | 4 | 5 |
|---|---|---|---|---|---|---|---|---|
| 1 | (Israel) (South Africa) | Noam Okun; Neville Godwin | 3; 6 | 7; 5 | 6^{2} 7^{7} | 3; 6 |
| 2 | (Israel) (South Africa) | Harel Levy; Marcos Ondruska | 6; 2 | 6; 2 | 6; 0 |
| 3 | (Israel) (South Africa) | Harel Levy / Noam Okun; Jeff Coetzee / Neville Godwin | 6^{5} 7^{7} | 6; 3 | 6; 4 | 6^{6} 7^{8} | 6; 8 |
| 4 | (Israel) (South Africa) | Harel Levy; Neville Godwin | 3; 6 | 7; 5 | | | | retired |
| 5 | (Israel) (South Africa) | Noam Okun; Marcos Ondruska | 6; 2 | 6; 4 | 6^{1} 7^{7} | 3; 6 | 7; 5 |

== Relegation play-offs ==
=== Monaco vs. Ireland ===
Monaco
1
Monte Carlo Country Club, Roquebrune-Cap-Martin, France
20–22 July 2001
Clay

Ireland
4

| | | | 1 | 2 | 3 | 4 | 5 |
|---|---|---|---|---|---|---|---|
| 1 | (Monaco) (Republic of Ireland) | Christophe Bosio; John Doran | 3; 6 | 5; 7 | 2; 6 |
| 2 | (Monaco) (Republic of Ireland) | Emmanuel Heussner; Scott Barron | 6; 4 | 3; 6 | 6; 4 | 6^{2} 7^{7} | 3; 6 |
| 3 | (Monaco) (Republic of Ireland) | Christophe Bosio / Emmanuel Heussner; Scott Barron / Owen Casey | 4; 6 | 4; 6 | 6; 3 | 3; 6 |
| 4 | (Monaco) (Republic of Ireland) | Christophe Bosio; Peter Clarke | 2; 6 | 6; 4 | 6^{2} 7^{7} |
| 5 | (Monaco) (Republic of Ireland) | Emmanuel Heussner; John Doran | 6; 2 | 6; 3 |

=== Moldova vs. Turkey ===
Moldova
3
Senator Club, Chișinău, Moldova
20–22 July 2001
Clay

Turkey
2

| | | | 1 | 2 | 3 | 4 | 5 |
|---|---|---|---|---|---|---|---|
| 1 | (Moldova) (Turkey) | Evgueni Plougarev; Erhan Oral | 4; 6 | 6; 1 | 7^{7} 6^{4} | 6; 4 |
| 2 | (Moldova) (Turkey) | Iurie Gorban; Mustafa Azkara | 2; 6 | 2; 6 | 6; 3 | 3; 6 |
| 3 | (Moldova) (Turkey) | Andrei Gorban / Iurie Gorban; Mustafa Azkara / Erhan Oral | 6; 3 | 2; 6 | 2; 6 | 6^{7} 7^{9} |
| 4 | (Moldova) (Turkey) | Evgueni Plougarev; Mustafa Azkara | 3; 6 | 6; 4 | 6; 4 | 6; 2 |
| 5 | (Moldova) (Turkey) | Andrei Gorban; Erhan Oral | 6; 2 | 6; 1 | 1; 6 | 7; 5 |

=== Ivory Coast vs. Estonia ===
Ivory Coast
3
InterContinental Hotel, Abidjan, Ivory Coast
20–22 July 2001
Hard

Estonia
2

| | | | 1 | 2 | 3 | 4 | 5 |
|---|---|---|---|---|---|---|---|---|
| 1 | (Ivory Coast) (Estonia) | Ilou Lonfo; Gert Vilms | 7^{10} 6^{8} | 6^{5} 7^{7} | 7; 5 | 6; 1 |
| 2 | (Ivory Coast) (Estonia) | Claude N'Goran; Alti Vahkal | 6; 4 | 6; 3 | 6; 3 |
| 3 | (Ivory Coast) (Estonia) | Ilou Lonfo / Claude N'Goran; Andrei Luzgin / Alti Vahkal | 6^{6} 7^{8} | 1; 1 | | | | retired |
| 4 | (Ivory Coast) (Estonia) | Valentin Sanon; Mait Künnap | 7^{7} 6^{5} | 4; 6 | 6; 0 | 6; 4 |
| 5 | (Ivory Coast) (Estonia) | Maxime Koffi; Andrei Luzgin | 3; 6 | 4; 6 |

=== Yugoslavia vs. Poland ===
Yugoslavia
3
Teniski Klub Partizan, Belgrade, Yugoslavia
20–22 July 2001
Clay

Poland
2

| | | | 1 | 2 | 3 | 4 | 5 |
|---|---|---|---|---|---|---|---|
| 1 | (Federal Republic of Yugoslavia) (Poland) | Janko Tipsarević; Bartłomiej Dąbrowski | 6; 3 | 7^{7} 6^{4} | 6; 4 |
| 2 | (Federal Republic of Yugoslavia) (Poland) | Dušan Vemić; Krystian Pfeiffer | 7; 5 | 6^{5} 7^{7} | 6^{7} 7^{9} | 3; 6 |
| 3 | (Federal Republic of Yugoslavia) (Poland) | Relja Dulić Fišer / Janko Tipsarević; Bartłomiej Dąbrowski / Marcin Matkowski | 6; 4 | 6; 3 | 6; 3 |
| 4 | (Federal Republic of Yugoslavia) (Poland) | Relja Dulić Fišer; Bartłomiej Dąbrowski | 3; 6 | 2; 6 | 1; 6 |
| 5 | (Federal Republic of Yugoslavia) (Poland) | Janko Tipsarević; Krystian Pfeiffer | 6; 2 | 7^{8} 6^{6} | 0; 6 | 4; 6 | 6; 4 |

== Third round ==
=== Greece vs. Denmark ===
Greece
3
Athens Lawn Tennis Club, Athens, Greece
21–23 September 2001
Clay

Denmark
2

| | | | 1 | 2 | 3 | 4 | 5 |
|---|---|---|---|---|---|---|---|
| 1 | (Greece) (Denmark) | Solon Peppas; Kristian Pless | 3; 6 | 1; 6 | 1; 6 |
| 2 | (Greece) (Denmark) | Vasilis Mazarakis; Thomas Larsen | 6; 4 | 6; 0 | 6; 3 |
| 3 | (Greece) (Denmark) | Konstantinos Economidis / Anastasios Vasiliadis; Kristian Pless / Jonathan Printzlau | 6; 1 | 7^{7} 6^{5} | 6^{4} 7^{7} | 7^{7} 6^{3} |
| 4 | (Greece) (Denmark) | Vasilis Mazarakis; Kristian Pless | 4; 6 | 3; 6 | 6; 3 | 2; 6 |
| 5 | (Greece) (Denmark) | Konstantinos Economidis; Thomas Larsen | 6; 2 | 6; 2 | 6; 0 |

=== Luxembourg vs. Israel ===
Luxembourg
1
Mondorf Tennis Club, Mondorf-les-Bains, Luxembourg
21–23 September 2001
Clay

Israel
4

| | | | 1 | 2 | 3 | 4 | 5 |
|---|---|---|---|---|---|---|---|
| 1 | (Luxembourg) (Israel) | Gilles Müller; Harel Levy | 5; 7 | 1; 6 | 3; 6 |
| 2 | (Luxembourg) (Israel) | Mike Scheidweiler; Noam Okun | 6; 3 | 4; 6 | 6; 4 | 7^{7} 6^{0} |
| 3 | (Luxembourg) (Israel) | Gilles Müller / Mike Scheidweiler; Amir Hadad / Harel Levy | 7^{7} 6^{2} | 6^{7} 7^{9} | 5; 7 | 7^{7} 6^{2} | 6; 8 |
| 4 | (Luxembourg) (Israel) | Mike Scheidweiler; Harel Levy | 6^{5} 7^{7} | 2; 6 | 4; 6 |
| 5 | (Luxembourg) (Israel) | Gilles Kremer; Andy Ram | 2; 6 | 5; 7 |
