= 1999 Davis Cup Europe/Africa Zone Group III – Zone B =

International tennis competition

The Europe/Africa Zone was one of the three zones of the regional Davis Cup competition in 1999.

In the Europe/Africa Zone there were four different tiers, called groups, in which teams competed against each other to advance to the upper tier. The top two teams in Group III advanced to the Europe/Africa Zone Group II in 2000, whereas the bottom two teams were relegated to the Europe/Africa Zone Group IV in 2000.

== Participating nations ==
- Armenia
- Estonia
- Georgia
- Kenya
- Lithuania
- Moldova
- Monaco
- Zambia

=== Draw ===
- Venue: Sini-Valge Tennis Club, Tallinn, Estonia
- Date: 9–13 June

Group A

	ARM	LTU	GEO	KEN	RR; W–L	Match; W–L	Set; W–L	Standings
Armenia		2–1	1–2	3–0	2–1	6–3 (66%)	13–9 (59%)	1
Lithuania	1–2		2–1	2–1	2–1	5–4 (56%)	12–9 (57%)	2
Georgia	2–1	1–2		2–1	2–1	5–4 (56%)	12–9 (57%)	3
Kenya	0–3	1–2	1–2		0–3	2–7 (22%)	5–15 (25%)	4

Group B

	MDA	EST	MON	ZAM	RR; W–L	Match; W–L	Set; W–L	Standings
Moldova		2–1	1–2	3–0	2–1	6–3 (67%)	13–7 (65%)	1
Estonia	1–2		2–1	3–0	2–1	6–3 (67%)	12–6 (66%)	2
Monaco	2–1	1–2		2–1	2–1	5–4 (56%)	10–10 (50%)	3
Zambia	0–3	0–3	1–2		0–3	1–8 (11%)	4–16 (20%)	4

1st to 4th place play-offs

3rd-4th play-off
A1	Armenia	1
B1	Moldova	2

Semifinals
A1	Armenia	1
B2	Estonia	2
A2	Lithuania	2
B1	Moldova	1

Final
B2	Estonia	2
A2	Lithuania	1

5th to 8th place play-offs

7th-8th play-off
A3	Zambia	0
A4	Kenya	3

5th-8th play-offs
A3	Georgia	3
B4	Zambia	0
A4	Kenya	1
B3	Monaco	2

5th-6th play-off
A3	Georgia	0
B3	Monaco	3

=== Final standings ===
Rank	Team
1	Estonia
2	Lithuania
3	Moldova
4	Armenia
5	Monaco
6	Georgia
7	Kenya
8	Zambia

- Estonia and Lithuania promoted to Group II in 2000.
- Kenya and Zambia relegated to Group IV in 2000.

== Round robin ==
=== Group A ===
==== Armenia vs. Lithuania ====
Armenia
2
Sini-Valge Tennis Club, Tallinn, Estonia
9 June 1999

Lithuania
1

			1	2	3
1	(Armenia) (Lithuania)	Harutyun Sofyan; Aivaras Balžekas	2; 6	7; 5	6; 3
2	(Armenia) (Lithuania)	Tsolak Gevorgyan; Rolandas Muraška	1; 6	2; 6
3	(Armenia) (Lithuania)	Tsolak Gevorgyan / Harutyun Sofyan; Rolandas Muraška / Arūnas Rozga	1; 6	6; 3	10; 8

==== Georgia vs. Kenya ====
Georgia
2
Sini-Valge Tennis Club, Tallinn, Estonia
9 June 1999

Kenya
1

			1	2	3
1	(Georgia (country)) (Kenya)	Irakli Ushangishvili; Allan Cooper	6; 0	4; 6	6; 8
2	(Georgia (country)) (Kenya)	Vladimir Gabrichidze; Norbert Oduor	6; 1	6; 1
3	(Georgia (country)) (Kenya)	Vladimir Gabrichidze / Irakli Ushangishvili; Allan Cooper / Trevor Kiruki	6; 2	7^{7} 6^{3}

==== Armenia vs. Kenya ====
Armenia
3
Sini-Valge Tennis Club, Tallinn, Estonia
10 June 1999

Kenya
0

			1	2	3
1	(Armenia) (Kenya)	Harutyun Sofyan; Allan Cooper	6; 4	0; 6	6; 2
2	(Armenia) (Kenya)	Tsolak Gevorgyan; Trevor Kiruki	6; 4	6; 0
3	(Armenia) (Kenya)	Tsolak Gevorgyan / Harutyun Sofyan; Balaraman Arun / Norbert Oduor	6; 4	6; 4

==== Georgia vs. Lithuania ====
Georgia
1
Sini-Valge Tennis Club, Tallinn, Estonia
10 June 1999

Lithuania
2

			1	2	3
1	(Georgia (country)) (Lithuania)	Irakli Ushangishvili; Aivaras Balžekas	6; 1	6; 4
2	(Georgia (country)) (Lithuania)	Vladimir Gabrichidze; Rolandas Muraška	1; 6	1; 6
3	(Georgia (country)) (Lithuania)	Vladimir Gabrichidze / Irakli Ushangishvili; Rolandas Muraška / Arūnas Rozga	1; 6	6; 3	7; 9

==== Armenia vs. Georgia ====
Armenia
1
Sini-Valge Tennis Club, Tallinn, Estonia
11 June 1999

Georgia
2

			1	2	3
1	(Armenia) (Georgia (country))	Harutyun Sofyan; Irakli Ushangishvili	7^{7} 6^{2}	7^{7} 6^{3}
2	(Armenia) (Georgia (country))	Tsolak Gevorgyan; Vladimir Gabrichidze	3; 6	6; 3	1; 6
3	(Armenia) (Georgia (country))	Tsolak Gevorgyan / Harutyun Sofyan; Vladimir Gabrichidze / Irakli Ushangishvili	5; 7	3; 6

==== Kenya vs. Lithuania ====
Kenya
1
Sini-Valge Tennis Club, Tallinn, Estonia
11 June 1999

Lithuania
2

			1	2	3
1	(Kenya) (Lithuania)	Allan Cooper; Aistis Šlajus	7; 5	6; 3
2	(Kenya) (Lithuania)	Norbert Oduor; Rolandas Muraška	1; 6	1; 6
3	(Kenya) (Lithuania)	Allan Cooper / Trevor Kiruki; Rolandas Muraška / Arūnas Rozga	4; 6	1; 6

=== Group B ===
==== Estonia vs. Zambia ====
Estonia
3
Sini-Valge Tennis Club, Tallinn, Estonia
9 June 1999

Zambia
0

			1	2	3
1	(Estonia) (Zambia)	Rene Busch; Sidney Bwalya	6; 0	6; 3
2	(Estonia) (Zambia)	Andrei Luzgin; Lighton Ndefwai-Muchinda	7^{11} 6^{9}	6; 2
3	(Estonia) (Zambia)	Mait Künnap / Andrei Luzgin; Sidney Bwalya / Kachinga Sinkala	6; 2	6; 1

==== Moldova vs. Monaco ====
Moldova
1
Sini-Valge Tennis Club, Tallinn, Estonia
9 June 1999

Monaco
2

			1	2	3
1	(Moldova) (Monaco)	Iurie Gorban; Christophe Bosio	6; 3	6; 2
2	(Moldova) (Monaco)	Evgueni Plougarev; Arnaud Dalbergue	3; 6	6; 3	7; 9
3	(Moldova) (Monaco)	Iurie Gorban / Evgueni Plougarev; Christophe Bosio / Sébastien Graeff	3; 6	5; 7

==== Estonia vs. Monaco ====
Estonia
2
Sini-Valge Tennis Club, Tallinn, Estonia
10 June 1999

Monaco
1

			1	2	3
1	(Estonia) (Monaco)	Mait Künnap; Sébastien Graeff	6; 1	7; 5
2	(Estonia) (Monaco)	Rene Busch; Arnaud Dalbergue	6; 1	6; 0
3	(Estonia) (Monaco)	Mait Künnap / Alti Vahkal; Christophe Bosio / Sébastien Graeff	3; 6	4; 6

==== Moldova vs. Zambia ====
Moldova
3
Sini-Valge Tennis Club, Tallinn, Estonia
10 June 1999

Zambia
0

			1	2	3
1	(Moldova) (Zambia)	Iurie Gorban; Sidney Bwalya	6; 2	6; 1
2	(Moldova) (Zambia)	Evgueni Plougarev; Lighton Ndefwai-Muchinda	6; 2	6; 4
3	(Moldova) (Zambia)	Iurie Gorban / Evgueni Plougarev; Sidney Bwalya / Khambula Msiska	6; 2	6^{3} 7^{7}	6; 4

==== Estonia vs. Moldova ====
Estonia
1
Sini-Valge Tennis Club, Tallinn, Estonia
11 June 1999

Moldova
2

			1	2	3
1	(Estonia) (Moldova)	Mait Künnap; Iurie Gorban	6^{10} 7^{12}	4; 6
2	(Estonia) (Moldova)	Rene Busch; Evgueni Plougarev	7; 5	6; 4
3	(Estonia) (Moldova)	Andrei Luzgin / Alti Vahkal; Iurie Gorban / Evgueni Plougarev	3; 6	3; 6

==== Monaco vs. Zambia ====
Monaco
2
Sini-Valge Tennis Club, Tallinn, Estonia
11 June 1999

Zambia
1

			1	2	3
1	(Monaco) (Zambia)	Sébastien Graeff; Khambula Msiska	5; 7	4; 6
2	(Monaco) (Zambia)	Christophe Bosio; Lighton Ndefwai-Muchinda	6; 3	2; 6	6; 1
3	(Monaco) (Zambia)	Christophe Bosio / Sébastien Graeff; Sidney Bwalya / Lighton Ndefwai-Muchinda	6; 4	6; 4

== 1st to 4th place play-offs ==
=== Semifinals ===
==== Armenia vs. Estonia ====
Armenia
1
Sini-Valge Tennis Club, Tallinn, Estonia
12 June 1999

Estonia
2

			1	2	3
1	(Armenia) (Estonia)	Harutyun Sofyan; Mait Künnap	3; 6	1; 6
2	(Armenia) (Estonia)	Tsolak Gevorgyan; Rene Busch	2; 6	0; 6
3	(Armenia) (Estonia)	Hayk Hakobyan / Harutyun Sofyan; Andrei Luzgin / Alti Vahkal	1; 6	6; 4	6; 3

==== Lithuania vs. Moldova ====
Lithuania
2
Sini-Valge Tennis Club, Tallinn, Estonia
12 June 1999

Moldova
1

			1	2	3
1	(Lithuania) (Moldova)	Aivaras Balžekas; Iurie Gorban	5; 7	3; 6
2	(Lithuania) (Moldova)	Rolandas Muraška; Evgueni Plougarev	6; 0	6; 4
3	(Lithuania) (Moldova)	Rolandas Muraška / Arūnas Rozga; Iurie Gorban / Evgueni Plougarev	6; 1	6^{5} 7^{7}	6; 0

=== Final ===
==== Estonia vs. Lithuania ====
Estonia
2
Sini-Valge Tennis Club, Tallinn, Estonia
13 June 1999

Lithuania
1

			1	2	3
1	(Estonia) (Lithuania)	Mait Künnap; Aivaras Balžekas	6; 2	6; 2
2	(Estonia) (Lithuania)	Andrei Luzgin; Rolandas Muraška	3; 6	4; 6
3	(Estonia) (Lithuania)	Mait Künnap / Andrei Luzgin; Rolandas Muraška / Arūnas Rozga	4; 6	6; 3	6; 4

=== 3rd to 4th play-off ===
==== Armenia vs. Moldova ====
Armenia
1
Sini-Valge Tennis Club, Tallinn, Estonia
13 June 1999

Moldova
2

			1	2	3
1	(Armenia) (Moldova)	Hayk Hakobyan; Iurie Gorban	7^{7} 6^{2}	2; 6	3; 6
2	(Armenia) (Moldova)	Harutyun Sofyan; Evgueni Plougarev	2; 6	0; 2		retired
3	(Armenia) (Moldova)	Tsolak Gevorgyan / Hayk Hakobyan; Sergei Bougaenko / Dumitru Chiriacov	6; 3	6; 0

== 5th to 8th place play-offs ==
=== 5th to 8th play-offs ===
==== Georgia vs. Zambia ====
Georgia
3
Sini-Valge Tennis Club, Tallinn, Estonia
12 June 1999

Zambia
0

			1	2	3
1	(Georgia (country)) (Zambia)	Irakli Ushangishvili; Khambula Msiska	6; 2	6; 0
2	(Georgia (country)) (Zambia)	Vladimir Gabrichidze; Lighton Ndefwai-Muchinda	6; 1	7; 5
3	(Georgia (country)) (Zambia)	Michael Chokheli / Georgi Revazishvili; Sidney Bwalya / Lighton Ndefwai-Muchinda	7; 5	6; 4

==== Kenya vs. Monaco ====
Kenya
1
Sini-Valge Tennis Club, Tallinn, Estonia
12 June 1999

Monaco
2

			1	2	3
1	(Kenya) (Monaco)	Allan Cooper; Christophe Bosio	4; 6	6; 1	8; 6
2	(Kenya) (Monaco)	Norbert Oduor; Arnaud Dalbergue	7; 5	6^{4} 7^{7}	0; 6
3	(Kenya) (Monaco)	Allan Cooper / Trevor Kiruki; Christophe Bosio / Sébastien Graeff	7^{8} 6^{6}	3; 6	7; 9

=== 5th to 6th play-off ===
==== Georgia vs. Monaco ====
Georgia
0
Sini-Valge Tennis Club, Tallinn, Estonia
13 June 1999

Monaco
3

			1	2	3
1	(Georgia (country)) (Monaco)	Georgi Revazishvili; Sébastien Graeff	6^{4} 7^{7}	0; 6
2	(Georgia (country)) (Monaco)	Michael Chokheli; Arnaud Dalbergue	1; 6	5; 7
3	(Georgia (country)) (Monaco)	Michael Chokheli / Georgi Revazishvili; Christophe Boggetti / Sébastien Graeff	6; 2	3; 6	4; 6

=== 7th to 8th play-off ===
==== Zambia vs. Kenya ====
Zambia
0
Sini-Valge Tennis Club, Tallinn, Estonia
13 June 1999

Kenya
3

			1	2	3
1	(Zambia) (Kenya)	Sidney Bwalya; Allan Cooper	2; 6	3; 6
2	(Zambia) (Kenya)	Lighton Ndefwai-Muchinda; Norbert Oduor	3; 6	6; 3	2; 6
3	(Zambia) (Kenya)	Sidney Bwalya / Khambula Msiska; Balaraman Arun / Trevor Kiruki	3; 6	6^{2} 7^{7}
