= 1997 Davis Cup Europe/Africa Zone Group III – Zone B =

International tennis competition

The Europe/Africa Zone was one of the three zones of the regional Davis Cup competition in 1997.

In the Europe/Africa Zone there were four different tiers, called groups, in which teams competed against each other to advance to the upper tier. The top two teams in Group III advanced to the Europe/Africa Zone Group II in 1998, whereas the bottom two teams were relegated to the Europe/Africa Zone Group IV in 1998.

== Participating nations ==
- Algeria
- Bulgaria
- Cameroon
- Estonia
- Kenya
- Malta
- Moldova
- Monaco

=== Draw ===
- Venue: Lokomotiv Tennis Club, Plovdiv, Bulgaria
- Date: 21–25 May

Group A

| | BUL | EST | KEN | MLT | RR; W–L | Match; W–L | Set; W–L | Standings |
| Bulgaria | | 3–0 | 3–0 | 3–0 | 3–0 | 9–0 (100%) | 18–0 (100%) | 1 |
| Estonia | 0–3 | | 2–1 | 2–1 | 2–1 | 4–5 (44%) | 8–11 (42%) | 2 |
| Kenya | 0–3 | 1–2 | | 2–1 | 1–2 | 3–6 (33%) | 6–13 (32%) | 3 |
| Malta | 0–3 | 1–2 | 1–2 | | 0–3 | 2–7 (22%) | 6–14 (30%) | 4 |

Group B

| | MON | MDA | CMR | ALG | RR; W–L | Match; W–L | Set; W–L | Standings |
| Monaco | | 3–0 | 2–1 | 2–1 | 3–0 | 7–2 (78%) | 15–6 (71%) | 1 |
| Moldova | 0–3 | | 3–0 | 3–0 | 2–1 | 6–3 (67%) | 13–7 (65%) | 2 |
| Cameroon | 1–2 | 0–3 | | 2–1 | 1–2 | 3–6 (33%) | 8–13 (38%) | 3 |
| Algeria | 1–2 | 0–3 | 1–2 | | 0–3 | 2–7 (22%) | 4–14 (22%) | 4 |

1st to 4th place play-offs

3rd-4th play-off
B2 | Moldova | 1
A2 | Estonia | 2

Semifinals
A1 | Bulgaria | 3
B2 | Moldova | 0
B1 | Monaco | 3
A2 | Estonia | 0

Final
A1 | Bulgaria | 3
B1 | Monaco | 0

5th to 8th place play-offs

7th-8th play-off
B4 | Algeria | 2
B3 | Cameroon | 1

5th-8th play-offs
A3 | Kenya | 2
B4 | Algeria | 1
A4 | Malta | 2
B3 | Cameroon | 1

5th-6th play-off
A3 | Kenya | 2
A4 | Malta | 1

=== Final standings ===
| Rank | Team |
|---|---|
| 1 | Bulgaria |
| 2 | Monaco |
| 3 | Estonia |
| 4 | Moldova |
| 5 | Kenya |
| 6 | Malta |
| 7 | Algeria |
| 8 | Cameroon |

- Bulgaria and Monaco promoted to Group II in 1998.
- Algeria and Cameroon relegated to Group IV in 1998.

== Round robin ==
=== Group A ===
==== Bulgaria vs. Malta ====
Bulgaria
3
Lokomotiv Tennis Club, Plovdiv, Bulgaria
21 May 1997

Malta
0

| | | | 1 | 2 | 3 |
|---|---|---|---|---|---|
| 1 | (Bulgaria) (Malta) | Ivan Keskinov; Mark Schembri | 6; 1 | 6; 1 |
| 2 | (Bulgaria) (Malta) | Orlin Stanoytchev; Christopher Gatt | 6; 4 | 6; 0 |
| 3 | (Bulgaria) (Malta) | Ivo Bratanov / Ivaylo Traykov; Gordon Asciak / Mark Schembri | 7^{10} 6^{8} | 6; 3 |

==== Estonia vs. Kenya ====
Estonia
2
Lokomotiv Tennis Club, Plovdiv, Bulgaria
21 May 1997

Kenya
1

| | | | 1 | 2 | 3 |
|---|---|---|---|---|---|
| 1 | (Estonia) (Kenya) | Andrei Luzgin; Allan Cooper | 6; 2 | 6; 1 |
| 2 | (Estonia) (Kenya) | Rene Busch; Paul Wekesa | 1; 6 | 2; 6 |
| 3 | (Estonia) (Kenya) | Andrei Luzgin / Gert Vilms; Allan Cooper / Paul Wekesa | 6; 3 | 6; 4 |

==== Bulgaria vs. Estonia ====
Bulgaria
3
Lokomotiv Tennis Club, Plovdiv, Bulgaria
22 May 1997

Estonia
0

| | | | 1 | 2 | 3 |
|---|---|---|---|---|---|
| 1 | (Bulgaria) (Estonia) | Ivan Keskinov; Andrei Luzgin | 6; 3 | 6; 1 |
| 2 | (Bulgaria) (Estonia) | Orlin Stanoytchev; Rene Busch | 6; 0 | 6; 2 |
| 3 | (Bulgaria) (Estonia) | Ivo Bratanov / Ivaylo Traykov; Raigo Saluste / Gert Vilms | 6; 2 | 6; 4 |

==== Kenya vs. Malta ====
Kenya
2
Lokomotiv Tennis Club, Plovdiv, Bulgaria
22 May 1997

Malta
1

| | | | 1 | 2 | 3 |
|---|---|---|---|---|---|
| 1 | (Kenya) (Malta) | Norbert Oduor; Gordon Asciak | 3; 6 | 4; 6 |
| 2 | (Kenya) (Malta) | Paul Wekesa; Christopher Gatt | 3; 6 | 6; 4 | 6; 3 |
| 3 | (Kenya) (Malta) | Allan Cooper / Norbert Oduor; Gordon Asciak / Mark Schembri | 6; 4 | 6; 2 |

==== Bulgaria vs. Kenya ====
Bulgaria
3
Lokomotiv Tennis Club, Plovdiv, Bulgaria
23 May 1997

Kenya
0

| | | | 1 | 2 | 3 |
|---|---|---|---|---|---|
| 1 | (Bulgaria) (Kenya) | Ivan Keskinov; Norbert Oduor | 6; 2 | 6; 4 |
| 2 | (Bulgaria) (Kenya) | Orlin Stanoytchev; Allan Cooper | 6; 2 | 6; 1 |
| 3 | (Bulgaria) (Kenya) | Ivo Bratanov / Ivaylo Traykov; Allan Cooper / Norbert Oduor | 6; 3 | 6; 2 |

==== Estonia vs. Malta ====
Estonia
2
Lokomotiv Tennis Club, Plovdiv, Bulgaria
23 May 1997

Malta
1

| | | | 1 | 2 | 3 |
|---|---|---|---|---|---|
| 1 | (Estonia) (Malta) | Andrei Luzgin; Gordon Asciak | 3; 6 | 6; 4 | 6; 3 |
| 2 | (Estonia) (Malta) | Rene Busch; Christopher Gatt | 3; 6 | 3; 6 |
| 3 | (Estonia) (Malta) | Andrei Luzgin / Gert Vilms; Gordon Asciak / Christopher Gatt | 6; 2 | 6; 3 |

=== Group B ===
==== Algeria vs. Monaco ====
Algeria
1
Lokomotiv Tennis Club, Plovdiv, Bulgaria
21 May 1997

Monaco
2

| | | | 1 | 2 | 3 |
|---|---|---|---|---|---|
| 1 | (Algeria) (Monaco) | Mohammed Mahmoudi; Christophe Bosio | 2; 6 | 6^{4} 7^{7} |
| 2 | (Algeria) (Monaco) | Noureddine Mahmoudi; Sébastien Graeff | 4; 6 | 3; 6 |
| 3 | (Algeria) (Monaco) | Noujeim Hakimi / Noureddine Mahmoudi; Christophe Boggetti / Sébastien Graeff | 7^{7} 6^{4} | 7^{8} 6^{6} |

==== Cameroon vs. Moldova ====
Cameroon
0
Lokomotiv Tennis Club, Plovdiv, Bulgaria
21 May 1997

Moldova
3

| | | | 1 | 2 | 3 |
|---|---|---|---|---|---|
| 1 | (Cameroon) (Moldova) | Angelin Mvogo; Oleg Sinic | 5; 7 | 6; 3 | 5; 7 |
| 2 | (Cameroon) (Moldova) | Yann Auzoux; Iurie Gorban | 3; 6 | 0; 6 |
| 3 | (Cameroon) (Moldova) | Lionel Kemajou / Joseph Oyebog; Iurie Gorban / Oleg Sinic | 3; 6 | 3; 6 |

==== Algeria vs. Moldova ====
Algeria
0
Lokomotiv Tennis Club, Plovdiv, Bulgaria
22 May 1997

Moldova
3

| | | | 1 | 2 | 3 |
|---|---|---|---|---|---|
| 1 | (Algeria) (Moldova) | Noujeim Hakimi; Oleg Sinic | 4; 6 | 1; 6 |
| 2 | (Algeria) (Moldova) | Noureddine Mahmoudi; Iurie Gorban | 3; 6 | 3; 6 |
| 3 | (Algeria) (Moldova) | Noujeim Hakimi / Noureddine Mahmoudi; Iurie Gorban / Oleg Sinic | 3; 6 | 4; 6 |

==== Cameroon vs. Monaco ====
Cameroon
1
Lokomotiv Tennis Club, Plovdiv, Bulgaria
22 May 1997

Monaco
2

| | | | 1 | 2 | 3 |
|---|---|---|---|---|---|
| 1 | (Cameroon) (Monaco) | Joseph Oyebog; Christophe Bosio | 4; 6 | 6; 3 | 7; 5 |
| 2 | (Cameroon) (Monaco) | Angelin Mvogo; Sébastien Graeff | 1; 6 | 2; 6 |
| 3 | (Cameroon) (Monaco) | Yann Auzoux / Joseph Oyebog; Christophe Boggetti / Sébastien Graeff | 4; 6 | 6; 3 | 14; 16 |

==== Algeria vs. Cameroon ====
Algeria
1
Lokomotiv Tennis Club, Plovdiv, Bulgaria
23 May 1997

Cameroon
2

| | | | 1 | 2 | 3 |
|---|---|---|---|---|---|
| 1 | (Algeria) (Cameroon) | Noujeim Hakimi; Joseph Oyebog | 0; 6 | 2; 6 |
| 2 | (Algeria) (Cameroon) | Mohammed Mahmoudi; Yann Auzoux | 6; 0 | 6; 4 |
| 3 | (Algeria) (Cameroon) | Noujeim Hakimi / Mohammed Mahmoudi; Lionel Kemajou / Joseph Oyebog | 1; 6 | 4; 6 |

==== Moldova vs. Monaco ====
Moldova
0
Lokomotiv Tennis Club, Plovdiv, Bulgaria
23 May 1997

Monaco
3

| | | | 1 | 2 | 3 |
|---|---|---|---|---|---|
| 1 | (Moldova) (Monaco) | Oleg Sinic; Christophe Bosio | 5; 7 | 7; 5 | 4; 6 |
| 2 | (Moldova) (Monaco) | Iurie Gorban; Sébastien Graeff | 4; 6 | 4; 6 |
| 3 | (Moldova) (Monaco) | Evgueni Plougarev / Maxim Savitski; Christophe Boggetti / Jacques Vinciléoni | 1; 6 | 1; 6 |

== 1st to 4th place play-offs ==
=== Semifinals ===
==== Bulgaria vs. Moldova ====
Bulgaria
3
Lokomotiv Tennis Club, Plovdiv, Bulgaria
24 May 1997

Moldova
0

| | | | 1 | 2 | 3 |
|---|---|---|---|---|---|
| 1 | (Bulgaria) (Moldova) | Ivan Keskinov; Oleg Sinic | 6; 2 | 6; 4 |
| 2 | (Bulgaria) (Moldova) | Orlin Stanoytchev; Iurie Gorban | 6^{6} 7^{8} | 6; 4 | 6; 3 |
| 3 | (Bulgaria) (Moldova) | Ivo Bratanov / Ivaylo Traykov; Evgueni Plougarev / Maxim Savitski | 6; 1 | 6; 3 |

==== Monaco vs. Estonia ====
Monaco
3
Lokomotiv Tennis Club, Plovdiv, Bulgaria
24 May 1997

Estonia
0

| | | | 1 | 2 | 3 |
|---|---|---|---|---|---|
| 1 | (Monaco) (Estonia) | Christophe Bosio; Andrei Luzgin | 6; 4 | 6; 4 |
| 2 | (Monaco) (Estonia) | Sébastien Graeff; Rene Busch | 7; 5 | 6; 4 |
| 3 | (Monaco) (Estonia) | Christophe Boggetti / Jacques Vinciléoni; Raigo Saluste / Gert Vilms | 7^{7} 6^{5} | 7^{7} 6^{5} |

=== Final ===
==== Bulgaria vs. Monaco ====
Bulgaria
3
Lokomotiv Tennis Club, Plovdiv, Bulgaria
25 May 1997

Monaco
0

| | | | 1 | 2 | 3 |
|---|---|---|---|---|---|
| 1 | (Bulgaria) (Monaco) | Ivan Keskinov; Christophe Bosio | 7; 5 | 6; 4 |
| 2 | (Bulgaria) (Monaco) | Orlin Stanoytchev; Sébastien Graeff | 6; 3 | 4; 6 | 6; 3 |
| 3 | (Bulgaria) (Monaco) | Ivo Bratanov / Ivaylo Traykov; Christophe Boggetti / Sébastien Graeff | 6^{6} 7^{8} | 6; 2 | 6; 1 |

=== 3rd to 4th play-off ===
==== Moldova vs. Estonia ====
Moldova
1
Lokomotiv Tennis Club, Plovdiv, Bulgaria
25 May 1997

Estonia
2

| | | | 1 | 2 | 3 |
|---|---|---|---|---|---|
| 1 | (Moldova) (Estonia) | Oleg Sinic; Gert Vilms | 6; 1 | 6; 3 |
| 2 | (Moldova) (Estonia) | Iurie Gorban; Rene Busch | 6; 3 | 4; 6 | 1; 6 |
| 3 | (Moldova) (Estonia) | Iurie Gorban / Oleg Sinic; Andrei Luzgin / Gert Vilms | 2; 6 | 3; 6 |

== 5th to 8th place play-offs ==
=== 5th to 8th play-offs ===
==== Kenya vs. Algeria ====
Kenya
2
Lokomotiv Tennis Club, Plovdiv, Bulgaria
24 May 1997

Algeria
1

| | | | 1 | 2 | 3 |
|---|---|---|---|---|---|
| 1 | (Kenya) (Algeria) | Allan Cooper; Mohammed Mahmoudi | 6; 4 | 3; 6 | 3; 6 |
| 2 | (Kenya) (Algeria) | Paul Wekesa; Noureddine Mahmoudi | 6; 3 | 3; 6 | 6; 3 |
| 3 | (Kenya) (Algeria) | Allan Cooper / Norbert Oduor; Noujeim Hakimi / Mohammed Mahmoudi | 5; 7 | 6; 4 | 6; 4 |

==== Malta vs. Cameroon ====
Malta
2
Lokomotiv Tennis Club, Plovdiv, Bulgaria
24 May 1997

Cameroon
1

| | | | 1 | 2 | 3 |
|---|---|---|---|---|---|
| 1 | (Malta) (Cameroon) | Mark Schembri; Joseph Oyebog | 7^{11} 6^{9} | 3; 6 | 6; 4 |
| 2 | (Malta) (Cameroon) | Christopher Gatt; Angelin Mvogo | 3; 6 | 3; 6 |
| 3 | (Malta) (Cameroon) | Gordon Asciak / Mark Schembri; Yann Auzoux / Angelin Mvogo | 7^{7} 6^{4} | 6; 3 |

=== 5th to 6th play-off ===
==== Kenya vs. Malta ====
Kenya
2
Lokomotiv Tennis Club, Plovdiv, Bulgaria
25 May 1997

Malta
1

| | | | 1 | 2 | 3 |
|---|---|---|---|---|---|---|
| 1 | (Kenya) (Malta) | Allan Cooper; Gordon Asciak | 6; 4 | 6; 2 |
| 2 | (Kenya) (Malta) | Paul Wekesa; Mark Schembri | 6; 3 | 4; 6 | 6; 2 |
| 3 | (Kenya) (Malta) | Allan Cooper / Norbert Oduor; Gordon Asciak / Christopher Gatt | | | | w/o |

=== 7th to 8th play-off ===
==== Algeria vs. Cameroon ====
Algeria
2
Lokomotiv Tennis Club, Plovdiv, Bulgaria
25 May 1997

Cameroon
1

| | | | 1 | 2 | 3 |
|---|---|---|---|---|---|---|
| 1 | (Algeria) (Cameroon) | Mohammed Mahmoudi; Angelin Mvogo | 0; 6 | 0; 0 | | retired |
| 2 | (Algeria) (Cameroon) | Noureddine Mahmoudi; Yann Auzoux | 6; 0 | 6; 1 |
| 3 | (Algeria) (Cameroon) | Noujeim Hakimi / Noureddine Mahmoudi; Yann Auzoux / Angelin Mvogo | 3; 6 | 7^{9} 6^{7} | 6; 1 |
