= 1998 Davis Cup Europe/Africa Zone Group III – Zone B =

International tennis competition

The Europe/Africa Zone was one of the three zones of the regional Davis Cup competition in 1998.

In the Europe/Africa Zone there were four different tiers, called groups, in which teams competed against each other to advance to the upper tier. The top two teams in Group III advanced to the Europe/Africa Zone Group II in 1999, whereas the bottom two teams were relegated to the Europe/Africa Zone Group IV in 1999.

== Participating nations ==
- Lithuania
- Macedonia
- Malta
- Moldova
- Nigeria
- San Marino
- Tunisia
- Turkey

=== Draw ===
- Venue: Jug Tennis Club, Skopje, Macedonia
- Date: 20–24 May

Group A

	NGR	TUR	MLT	SMR	RR; W–L	Match; W–L	Set; W–L	Standings
Nigeria		3–0	2–1	3–0	3–0	8–1 (89%)	17–6 (74%)	1
Turkey	0–3		2–1	3–0	2–1	5–4 (56%)	12–9 (57%)	2
Malta	1–2	1–2		2–1	1–2	4–5 (44%)	7–11 (39%)	3
San Marino	0–3	0–3	1–2		0–3	1–8 (11%)	5–15 (25%)	4

Group B

	LTU	MKD	MDA	TUN	RR; W–L	Match; W–L	Set; W–L	Standings
Lithuania		2–1	1–2	3–0	2–1	6–3 (67%)	13–7 (65%)	1
Macedonia	1–2		2–1	2–1	2–1	5–4 (56%)	11–8 (58%)	2
Moldova	2–1	1–2		2–1	2–1	5–4 (56%)	10–9 (53%)	3
Tunisia	0–3	1–2	1–2		0–3	2–7 (22%)	4–14 (22%)	4

1st to 4th place play-offs

3rd-4th play-off
A1	Nigeria	1
B1	Lithuania	2

Semifinals
A1	Nigeria	1
B2	Macedonia	2
A2	Turkey	2
B1	Lithuania	1

Final
B2	Macedonia	0
A2	Turkey	3

5th to 8th place play-offs

7th-8th play-off
A3	Malta	1
A4	San Marino	2

5th-8th play-offs
A3	Malta	1
B4	Tunisia	2
A4	San Marino	1
B3	Moldova	2

5th-6th play-off
B4	Tunisia	2
B3	Moldova	1

=== Final standings ===
Rank	Team
1	Turkey
2	Macedonia
3	Lithuania
4	Nigeria
5	Tunisia
6	Moldova
7	San Marino
8	Malta

- Turkey and Macedonia promoted to Group II in 1999.
- San Marino and Malta relegated to Group IV in 1999.

== Round robin ==
=== Group A ===
==== Malta vs. Nigeria ====
Malta
1
Jug Tennis Club, Skopje, Macedonia
20 May 1998

Nigeria
2

			1	2	3
1	(Malta) (Nigeria)	Mark Schembri; Jonathan Igbinovia	2; 6	6^{5} 7^{7}
2	(Malta) (Nigeria)	Christopher Gatt; Sule Ladipo	5; 7	3; 6
3	(Malta) (Nigeria)	Gordon Asciak / Mark Schembri; Ganiyu Adenekan / Yakubu Suleiman	6; 3	5; 7	6; 4

==== San Marino vs. Turkey ====
San Marino
0
Jug Tennis Club, Skopje, Macedonia
20 May 1998

Turkey
3

			1	2	3
1	(San Marino) (Turkey)	Christian Rosti; Erhan Oral	6^{4} 7^{7}	3; 6
2	(San Marino) (Turkey)	Domenico Vicini; Efe Üstündağ	3; 6	6; 4	3; 6
3	(San Marino) (Turkey)	William Forcellini / Domenico Vicini; Mustafa Azkara / Erhan Oral	1; 6	1; 6

==== Malta vs. Turkey ====
Malta
1
Jug Tennis Club, Skopje, Macedonia
21 May 1998

Turkey
2

			1	2	3
1	(Malta) (Turkey)	Mark Schembri; Erhan Oral	5; 7	6^{6} 7^{8}
2	(Malta) (Turkey)	Christopher Gatt; Efe Üstündağ	7^{8} 6^{6}	7; 5
3	(Malta) (Turkey)	Gordon Asciak / Mark Schembri; Mustafa Azkara / Erhan Oral	4; 6	2; 6

==== Nigeria vs. San Marino ====
Nigeria
3
Jug Tennis Club, Skopje, Macedonia
21 May 1998

San Marino
0

			1	2	3
1	(Nigeria) (San Marino)	Jonathan Igbinovia; Christian Rosti	7^{7} 6^{4}	1; 6	6; 3
2	(Nigeria) (San Marino)	Sule Ladipo; Domenico Vicini	5; 7	7^{7} 6^{4}	6; 1
3	(Nigeria) (San Marino)	Ganiyu Adenekan / Yakubu Suleiman; Christian Rosti / Domenico Vicini	6; 2	6; 3

==== Malta vs. San Marino ====
Malta
2
Jug Tennis Club, Skopje, Macedonia
22 May 1998

San Marino
1

			1	2	3
1	(Malta) (San Marino)	Gordon Asciak; Christian Rosti	6; 2	1; 0		retired
2	(Malta) (San Marino)	Christopher Gatt; Domenico Vicini	3; 6	5; 7
3	(Malta) (San Marino)	Gordon Asciak / Mark Schembri; William Forcellini / Domenico Vicini	6; 3	6; 3

==== Nigeria vs. Turkey ====
Nigeria
3
Jug Tennis Club, Skopje, Macedonia
22 May 1998

Turkey
0

			1	2	3
1	(Nigeria) (Turkey)	Jonathan Igbinovia; Mustafa Azkara	6; 5	6^{2} 7^{7}	9; 7
2	(Nigeria) (Turkey)	Sule Ladipo; Erhan Oral	3; 6	7; 5	6; 3
3	(Nigeria) (Turkey)	Ganiyu Adenekan / Yakubu Suleiman; Haluk Akkoyun / Efe Üstündağ	6; 2	6; 3

=== Group B ===
==== Macedonia vs. Tunisia ====
Macedonia
2
Jug Tennis Club, Skopje, Macedonia
20 May 1998

Tunisia
1

			1	2	3
1	(North Macedonia) (Tunisia)	Zoran Ševčenko; Sami Baccar	6; 4	6; 1
2	(North Macedonia) (Tunisia)	Ognen Nikolovski; Walid Jallali	3; 6	4; 6
3	(North Macedonia) (Tunisia)	Lazar Magdinčev / Zoran Ševčenko; Sami Baccar / Walid Jallali	6; 2	6; 3

==== Lithuania vs. Moldova ====
Lithuania
1
Jug Tennis Club, Skopje, Macedonia
20 May 1998

Moldova
2

			1	2	3
1	(Lithuania) (Moldova)	Aistis Šlajus; Iurie Gorban	0; 6	3; 6
2	(Lithuania) (Moldova)	Rolandas Muraška; Evgueni Plougarev	6; 2	6; 4
3	(Lithuania) (Moldova)	Rolandas Muraška / Tomas Petrauskas; Iurie Gorban / Evgueni Plougarev	6; 4	3; 6	7; 9

==== Macedonia vs. Moldova ====
Macedonia
2
Jug Tennis Club, Skopje, Macedonia
21 May 1998

Moldova
1

			1	2	3
1	(North Macedonia) (Moldova)	Zoran Ševčenko; Iurie Gorban	6; 4	6; 4
2	(North Macedonia) (Moldova)	Dragan Jovanovski; Evgueni Plougarev	4; 6	6^{5} 7^{7}
3	(North Macedonia) (Moldova)	Lazar Magdinčev / Zoran Ševčenko; Iurie Gorban / Evgueni Plougarev	6; 2	6; 1

==== Lithuania vs. Tunisia ====
Lithuania
3
Jug Tennis Club, Skopje, Macedonia
21 May 1998

Tunisia
0

			1	2	3
1	(Lithuania) (Tunisia)	Aistis Šlajus; Sami Baccar	6; 4	6; 3
2	(Lithuania) (Tunisia)	Rolandas Muraška; Walid Jallali	6; 3	6; 0
3	(Lithuania) (Tunisia)	Rolandas Muraška / Aistis Šlajus; Aref Jallali / Issam Jellali	6; 2	6; 1

==== Macedonia vs. Lithuania ====
Macedonia
1
Jug Tennis Club, Skopje, Macedonia
22 May 1998

Lithuania
2

			1	2	3
1	(North Macedonia) (Lithuania)	Zoran Ševčenko; Aistis Šlajus	6; 2	6; 4
2	(North Macedonia) (Lithuania)	Lazar Magdinčev; Rolandas Muraška	6^{4} 7^{7}	3; 6
3	(North Macedonia) (Lithuania)	Lazar Magdinčev / Zoran Ševčenko; Rolandas Muraška / Aistis Šlajus	6; 3	5; 7	6; 8

==== Moldova vs. Tunisia ====
Moldova
2
Jug Tennis Club, Skopje, Macedonia
22 May 1998

Tunisia
1

			1	2	3
1	(Moldova) (Tunisia)	Iurie Gorban; Issam Jellali	6; 1	6; 0
2	(Moldova) (Tunisia)	Evgueni Plougarev; Walid Jallali	5; 7	4; 6
3	(Moldova) (Tunisia)	Victor Ribas / Oleg Sinic; Walid Jallali / Issam Jellali	7; 5	6; 3

== 1st to 4th place play-offs ==
=== Semifinals ===
==== Nigeria vs. Macedonia ====
Nigeria
1
Jug Tennis Club, Skopje, Macedonia
23 May 1998

Macedonia
2

			1	2	3
1	(Nigeria) (North Macedonia)	Jonathan Igbinovia; Zoran Ševčenko	1; 6	4; 6
2	(Nigeria) (North Macedonia)	Sule Ladipo; Lazar Magdinčev	6; 2	6; 4
3	(Nigeria) (North Macedonia)	Sule Ladipo / Yakubu Suleiman; Lazar Magdinčev / Zoran Ševčenko	7^{7} 6^{4}	6^{1} 7^{7}	4; 6

==== Lithuania vs. Turkey ====
Lithuania
1
Jug Tennis Club, Skopje, Macedonia
23 May 1998

Turkey
2

			1	2	3
1	(Lithuania) (Turkey)	Aistis Šlajus; Erhan Oral	0; 6	0; 6
2	(Lithuania) (Turkey)	Rolandas Muraška; Efe Üstündağ	6; 3	6; 1
3	(Lithuania) (Turkey)	Rolandas Muraška / Aistis Šlajus; Mustafa Azkara / Erhan Oral	3; 6	4; 6

=== Final ===
==== Macedonia vs. Turkey ====
Macedonia
0
Jug Tennis Club, Skopje, Macedonia
24 May 1998

Turkey
3

			1	2	3
1	(North Macedonia) (Turkey)	Dragan Jovanovski; Erhan Oral	0; 6	1; 6
2	(North Macedonia) (Turkey)	Ognen Nikolovski; Efe Üstündağ	1; 6	2; 6
3	(North Macedonia) (Turkey)	Lazar Magdinčev / Zoran Ševčenko; Mustafa Azkara / Erhan Oral	6^{4} 7^{7}	6^{4} 7^{7}

=== 3rd to 4th play-off ===
==== Nigeria vs. Lithuania ====
Nigeria
1
Jug Tennis Club, Skopje, Macedonia
24 May 1998

Lithuania
2

			1	2	3
1	(Nigeria) (Lithuania)	Yakubu Suleiman; Tomas Petrauskas	1; 3			retired
2	(Nigeria) (Lithuania)	Jonathan Igbinovia; Aistis Šlajus	6^{5} 7^{7}	6; 4	6; 1
3	(Nigeria) (Lithuania)	Ganiyu Adenekan / Jonathan Igbinovia; Rolandas Muraška / Tomas Petrauskas	6^{4} 7^{7}	4; 6

== 5th to 8th place play-offs ==
=== 5th to 8th play-offs ===
==== Tunisia vs. Malta ====
Tunisia
2
Jug Tennis Club, Skopje, Macedonia
23 May 1998

Malta
1

			1	2	3
1	(Tunisia) (Malta)	Issam Jellali; Gordon Asciak	2; 6	4; 6
2	(Tunisia) (Malta)	Walid Jallali; Christopher Gatt	7^{7} 6^{3}	6; 4
3	(Tunisia) (Malta)	Walid Jallali / Issam Jellali; Gordon Asciak / Mark Schembri	6; 4	7^{7} 6^{4}

==== Moldova vs. San Marino ====
Moldova
2
Jug Tennis Club, Skopje, Macedonia
23 May 1998

San Marino
1

			1	2	3
1	(Moldova) (San Marino)	Iurie Gorban; William Forcellini	6; 2	6; 0
2	(Moldova) (San Marino)	Evgueni Plougarev; Domenico Vicini	3; 6	7^{7} 6^{5}	5; 7
3	(Moldova) (San Marino)	Victor Ribas / Oleg Sinic; Christian Rosti / Domenico Vicini	6; 3	6; 4

=== 5th to 6th play-off ===
==== Tunisia vs. Moldova ====
Tunisia
2
Jug Tennis Club, Skopje, Macedonia
24 May 1998

Moldova
1

			1	2	3
1	(Tunisia) (Moldova)	Issam Jellali; Iurie Gorban	2; 6	5; 7
2	(Tunisia) (Moldova)	Walid Jallali; Evgueni Plougarev	6; 3	1; 6	6; 2
3	(Tunisia) (Moldova)	Walid Jallali / Issam Jellali; Victor Ribas / Oleg Sinic	6; 4	7^{9} 6^{7}

=== 7th to 8th play-off ===
==== Malta vs. San Marino ====
Malta
1
Jug Tennis Club, Skopje, Macedonia
24 May 1998

San Marino
2

			1	2	3
1	(Malta) (San Marino)	Mark Schembri; William Forcellini	6; 3	6; 1
2	(Malta) (San Marino)	Marco Cappello; Domenico Vicini	3; 6	5; 7
3	(Malta) (San Marino)	Gordon Asciak / Mark Schembri; Christian Rosti / Domenico Vicini	6^{5} 7^{7}	2; 6
