= 2006 Davis Cup Europe/Africa Zone Group III – Zone A =

International tennis competition

The Europe/Africa Zone was one of the three zones of the regional Davis Cup competition in 2006.

In the Europe/Africa Zone there were four different tiers, called groups, in which teams competed against each other to advance to the upper tier. Group III was split into two tournaments. One tournament was held in Teniski Klub 'MLADOST', Banja Luka, Bosnia and Herzegovina, July 19–23, on outdoor clay courts, while the other was held in BTA Centre (Notswane Courts), Gaborone, Botswana, July 26–30, on outdoor hard courts.

== Format ==
The eight teams in the Banja Luka tournament were split into two pools and played in a round-robin format. The top two teams of each pool advanced to the promotion pool, from which the two top teams were promoted to the Europe/Africa Zone Group II in 2007. The bottom two teams of each group were placed in the relegation pool, from which the two bottom teams were demoted to the Europe/Africa Zone Group IV in 2007.

== Pool A ==
	Pool A	EST	LTU	ARM	AND
1	Estonia (3–0)		2–1	2–1	3–0
2	Lithuania (2–1)	1–2		2–1	3–0
3	Armenia (1–2)	1–2	1–2		2–1
4	Andorra (0–3)	0–3	0–3	1–2	

=== Lithuania vs. Andorra ===
Lithuania
3
Teniski Klub 'MLADOST', Banja Luka, Bosnia and Herzegovina
19 July 2006
Clay

Andorra
0

			1	2	3
1	(Lithuania) (Andorra)	Daniel Lencina-Ribes; Jean-Baptiste Poux-Gautier	7^{7} 6^{5}	7; 5
2	(Lithuania) (Andorra)	Gvidas Sabeckis; Pau Gerbaud-Farras	6; 1	7; 5
3	(Lithuania) (Andorra)	Daniel Lencina-Ribes / Gvidas Sabeckis; Hector Hormigo-Herrera / Axel Rabanal	6; 1	6; 0

=== Armenia vs. Estonia ===
Armenia
1
Teniski Klub 'MLADOST', Banja Luka, Bosnia and Herzegovina
19 July 2006
Clay

Estonia
2

			1	2	3
1	(Armenia) (Estonia)	Hayk Zohranyan; Jaak Põldma	6^{7} 7^{9}	2; 6
2	(Armenia) (Estonia)	Sargis Sargsian; Vladimir Ivanov	4; 6	4; 6
3	(Armenia) (Estonia)	Sargis Sargsian / Harutyun Sofyan; Mikk Irdoja / Jürgen Zopp	3; 6	6; 1	6; 4

=== Lithuania vs. Estonia ===
Lithuania
1
Teniski Klub 'MLADOST', Banja Luka, Bosnia and Herzegovina
20 July 2006
Clay

Estonia
2

			1	2	3
1	(Lithuania) (Estonia)	Daniel Lencina-Ribes; Jaak Põldma	5; 7	0; 6
2	(Lithuania) (Estonia)	Gvidas Sabeckis; Vladimir Ivanov	6; 3	6; 4
3	(Lithuania) (Estonia)	Daniel Lencina-Ribes / Gvidas Sabeckis; Jaak Põldma / Jürgen Zopp	1; 6	3; 6

=== Armenia vs. Andorra ===
Armenia
2
Teniski Klub 'MLADOST', Banja Luka, Bosnia and Herzegovina
20 July 2006
Clay

Andorra
1

			1	2	3
1	(Armenia) (Andorra)	Hayk Zohranyan; Jean-Baptiste Poux-Gautier	0; 6	1; 6
2	(Armenia) (Andorra)	Sargis Sargsian; Pau Gerbaud-Farras	6; 4	6; 2
3	(Armenia) (Andorra)	Sargis Sargsian / Harutyun Sofyan; Pau Gerbaud-Farras / Jean-Baptiste Poux-Gautier	7; 5	6; 4

=== Lithuania vs. Armenia ===
Lithuania
2
Teniski Klub 'MLADOST', Banja Luka, Bosnia and Herzegovina
21 July 2006
Clay

Armenia
1

			1	2	3
1	(Lithuania) (Armenia)	Daniel Lencina-Ribes; Harutyun Sofyan	6; 2	6; 2
2	(Lithuania) (Armenia)	Gvidas Sabeckis; Sargis Sargsian	7^{7} 6^{1}	5; 7	6; 3
3	(Lithuania) (Armenia)	Mindaugas Čeledinas / Denis Riabuchin; Vahe Avetisyan / Hayk Zohranyan	7^{8} 6^{6}	0; 6	2; 6

=== Estonia vs. Andorra ===
Estonia
3
Teniski Klub 'MLADOST', Banja Luka, Bosnia and Herzegovina
21 July 2006
Clay

Andorra
0

			1	2	3
1	(Estonia) (Andorra)	Mikk Irdoja; Hector Hormigo-Herrera	6; 3	6; 1
2	(Estonia) (Andorra)	Jürgen Zopp; Pau Gerbaud-Farras	6; 3	6; 3
3	(Estonia) (Andorra)	Mikk Irdoja / Jaak Põldma; Jean-Baptiste Poux-Gautier / Axel Rabanal	6; 2	6; 4

== Pool B ==
	Pool B	MON	TUR	BIH	MDA
1	Monaco (3–0)		3–0	3–0	2–1
2	Turkey (2–1)	0–3		2–1	3–0
3	Bosnia and Herzegovina (1–2)	0–3	1–2		2–1
4	Moldova (0–3)	1–2	0–3	1–2	

=== Turkey vs. Monaco ===
Turkey
0
Teniski Klub 'MLADOST', Banja Luka, Bosnia and Herzegovina
19 July 2006
Clay

Monaco
3

			1	2	3
1	(Turkey) (Monaco)	Haluk Akkoyun; Guillaume Couillard	6; 3	3; 6	2; 6
2	(Turkey) (Monaco)	Ergün Zorlu; Benjamin Balleret	3; 6	1; 6
3	(Turkey) (Monaco)	Barış Ergüden / Alaatin Bora Gerçeker; Thomas Drouet / Emmanuel Heussner	4; 6	6; 4	4; 6

=== Bosnia and Herzegovina vs. Moldova ===
Bosnia and Herzegovina
2
Teniski Klub 'MLADOST', Banja Luka, Bosnia and Herzegovina
19 July 2006
Clay

Moldova
1

			1	2	3
1	(Bosnia and Herzegovina) (Moldova)	Bojan Vujić; Andrei Ciumac	6; 3	5; 7	6; 1
2	(Bosnia and Herzegovina) (Moldova)	Ivan Dodig; Roman Borvanov	4; 6	6; 4	7; 9
3	(Bosnia and Herzegovina) (Moldova)	Ivan Dodig / Bojan Vujić; Roman Borvanov / Evghenii Plugariov	4; 6	6; 0	6; 2

=== Turkey vs. Moldova ===
Turkey
3
Teniski Klub 'MLADOST', Banja Luka, Bosnia and Herzegovina
20 July 2006
Clay

Moldova
0

			1	2	3
1	(Turkey) (Moldova)	Haluk Akkoyun; Roman Tudoreanu	6; 3	6; 1
2	(Turkey) (Moldova)	Ergün Zorlu; Evghenii Plugariov	6; 4	6; 3
3	(Turkey) (Moldova)	Haluk Akkoyun / Ergün Zorlu; Andrei Ciumac / Roman Tudoreanu	6; 2	6; 2

=== Bosnia and Herzegovina vs. Monaco ===
Bosnia and Herzegovina
0
Teniski Klub 'MLADOST', Banja Luka, Bosnia and Herzegovina
20 July 2006
Clay

Monaco
3

			1	2	3
1	(Bosnia and Herzegovina) (Monaco)	Bojan Vujić; Guillaume Couillard	5; 7	3; 6
2	(Bosnia and Herzegovina) (Monaco)	Aleksandar Marić; Benjamin Balleret	1; 6	3; 6
3	(Bosnia and Herzegovina) (Monaco)	Ivan Dodig / Siniša Marković; Thomas Drouet / Emmanuel Heussner	3; 6	5; 7

=== Turkey vs. Bosnia and Herzegovina ===
Turkey
2
Teniski Klub 'MLADOST', Banja Luka, Bosnia and Herzegovina
21 July 2006
Clay

Bosnia and Herzegovina
1

			1	2	3
1	(Turkey) (Bosnia and Herzegovina)	Haluk Akkoyun; Aleksandar Marić	6; 4	6; 4
2	(Turkey) (Bosnia and Herzegovina)	Ergün Zorlu; Ivan Dodig	2; 6	6; 2	5; 7
3	(Turkey) (Bosnia and Herzegovina)	Haluk Akkoyun / Ergün Zorlu; Ivan Dodig / Bojan Vujić	6^{7} 7^{9}	7^{11} 6^{9}	6; 4

=== Moldova vs. Monaco ===
Moldova
1
Teniski Klub 'MLADOST', Banja Luka, Bosnia and Herzegovina
21 July 2006
Clay

Monaco
2

			1	2	3
1	(Moldova) (Monaco)	Andrei Ciumac; Thomas Drouet	7^{10} 6^{8}	6; 2
2	(Moldova) (Monaco)	Roman Borvanov; Benjamin Balleret	4; 6	3; 6
3	(Moldova) (Monaco)	Roman Borvanov / Andrei Ciumac; Guillaume Couillard / Emmanuel Heussner	3; 6	4; 6

== Promotion pool ==
The top two teams from each of Pools A and B advanced to the Promotion pool. Results and points from games against the opponent from the preliminary round were carried forward.

(scores in italics carried over from Groups)

	1st–4th Play-off	MON	EST	TUR	LTU
1	Monaco (3–0)		2–1	3–0	3–0
2	Estonia (1–2)	1–2		1–2	2–1
3	Turkey (1–2)	0–3	2–1		1–2
4	Lithuania (1–2)	0–3	1–2	2–1	

Monaco and Estonia promoted to Group II in 2007.

=== Estonia vs. Monaco ===
Estonia
1
Teniski Klub 'MLADOST', Banja Luka, Bosnia and Herzegovina
22 July 2006
Clay

Monaco
2

			1	2	3
1	(Estonia) (Monaco)	Jaak Põldma; Guillaume Couillard	2; 6	6; 4	2; 6
2	(Estonia) (Monaco)	Jürgen Zopp; Benjamin Balleret	1; 6	1; 6
3	(Estonia) (Monaco)	Mikk Irdoja / Jürgen Zopp; Thomas Drouet / Emmanuel Heussner	7; 5			retired

=== Lithuania vs. Turkey ===
Lithuania
2
Teniski Klub 'MLADOST', Banja Luka, Bosnia and Herzegovina
22 July 2006
Clay

Turkey
1

			1	2	3
1	(Lithuania) (Turkey)	Daniel Lencina-Ribes; Haluk Akkoyun	7^{7} 6^{1}	6; 2
2	(Lithuania) (Turkey)	Gvidas Sabeckis; Ergün Zorlu	7; 5	6; 1
3	(Lithuania) (Turkey)	Daniel Lencina-Ribes / Gvidas Sabeckis; Barış Ergüden / Alaatin Bora Gerçeker	5; 7	3; 6

=== Estonia vs. Turkey ===
Estonia
1
Teniski Klub 'MLADOST', Banja Luka, Bosnia and Herzegovina
23 July 2006
Clay

Turkey
2

			1	2	3
1	(Estonia) (Turkey)	Jaak Põldma; Barış Ergüden	6; 3	6; 3
2	(Estonia) (Turkey)	Vladimir Ivanov; Ergün Zorlu	3; 6	4; 6
3	(Estonia) (Turkey)	Mikk Irdoja / Jürgen Zopp; Barış Ergüden / Ergün Zorlu	2; 6	6; 4	4; 6

=== Lithuania vs. Monaco ===
Lithuania
0
Teniski Klub 'MLADOST', Banja Luka, Bosnia and Herzegovina
23 July 2006
Clay

Monaco
3

			1	2	3
1	(Lithuania) (Monaco)	Daniel Lencina-Ribes; Guillaume Couillard	0; 6	2; 6
2	(Lithuania) (Monaco)	Gvidas Sabeckis; Benjamin Balleret	3; 6	3; 6
3	(Lithuania) (Monaco)	Mindaugas Čeledinas / Denis Riabuchin; Benjamin Balleret / Emmanuel Heussner	3; 6	2; 6

== Relegation pool ==
The bottom two teams from Pools A and B were placed in the relegation group. Results and points from games against the opponent from the preliminary round were carried forward.

(scores in italics carried over from Groups)

	5th–8th Play-off	BIH	MDA	ARM	AND
1	Bosnia and Herzegovina (3–0)		2–1	3–0	2–1
2	Moldova (2–1)	1–2		3–0	3–0
3	Armenia (1–2)	0–3	0–3		2–1
4	Andorra (0–3)	1–2	0–3	1–2	

Armenia and Anderra relegated to Group IV in 2007.

=== Armenia vs. Bosnia and Herzegovina ===
Armenia
0
Teniski Klub 'MLADOST', Banja Luka, Bosnia and Herzegovina
22 July 2006
Clay

Bosnia and Herzegovina
3

			1	2	3
1	(Armenia) (Bosnia and Herzegovina)	Hayk Zohranyan; Bojan Vujić	3; 6	0; 2		retired
2	(Armenia) (Bosnia and Herzegovina)	Sargis Sargsian; Ivan Dodig	4; 6	6^{4} 7^{7}
3	(Armenia) (Bosnia and Herzegovina)	Vahe Avetisyan / Harutyun Sofyan; Aleksandar Marić / Siniša Marković	1; 6	6; 3	2; 6

=== Andorra vs. Moldova ===
Andorra
0
Teniski Klub 'MLADOST', Banja Luka, Bosnia and Herzegovina
22 July 2006
Clay

Moldova
3

			1	2	3
1	(Andorra) (Moldova)	Jean-Baptiste Poux-Gautier; Andrei Ciumac	4; 6	6; 2	3; 6
2	(Andorra) (Moldova)	Pau Gerbaud-Farras; Roman Borvanov	3; 6	1; 6
3	(Andorra) (Moldova)	Hector Hormigo-Herrera / Axel Rabanal; Roman Borvanov / Evghenii Plugariov	1; 6	4; 6

=== Armenia vs. Moldova ===
Armenia
0
Teniski Klub 'MLADOST', Banja Luka, Bosnia and Herzegovina
23 July 2006
Clay

Moldova
3

			1	2	3
1	(Armenia) (Moldova)	Harutyun Sofyan; Andrei Ciumac	1; 6	4; 6
2	(Armenia) (Moldova)	Hayk Zohranyan; Roman Borvanov	0; 6	0; 6
3	(Armenia) (Moldova)	Harutyun Sofyan / Hayk Zohranyan; Andrei Ciumac / Roman Tudoreanu	1; 3			retired

=== Andorra vs. Bosnia and Herzegovina ===
Andorra
1
Teniski Klub 'MLADOST', Banja Luka, Bosnia and Herzegovina
23 July 2006
Clay

Bosnia and Herzegovina
2

			1	2	3
1	(Andorra) (Bosnia and Herzegovina)	Hector Hormigo-Herrera; Siniša Marković	0; 6	0; 6
2	(Andorra) (Bosnia and Herzegovina)	Jean-Baptiste Poux-Gautier; Aleksandar Marić	7^{9} 6^{7}	6; 2
3	(Andorra) (Bosnia and Herzegovina)	Pau Gerbaud-Farras / Jean-Baptiste Poux-Gautier; Ivan Dodig / Bojan Vujić	7^{8} 6^{6}	6^{6} 7^{8}	4; 6

== Final standings ==
Rank	Team
1	Monaco
2	Estonia
3	Turkey
4	Lithuania
5	Bosnia and Herzegovina
6	Moldova
7	Armenia
8	Andorra

- Monaco and Estonia promoted to Group II in 2007.
- Armenia and Andorra relegated to Group IV in 2007.
