= 1995 Davis Cup Europe/Africa Zone Group III – Zone A =

International tennis competition

Zone A of the 1995 Davis Cup Europe/Africa Group III was one of two zones in the Europe/Africa Group III of the 1995 Davis Cup. 11 teams competed across two pools in a round robin competition, with the top team in each pool advancing to Group II in 1996.

== Participating nations ==
- Benin
- Bulgaria
- Cameroon
- Georgia
- Greece
- Macedonia
- Moldova
- San Marino
- Togo
- Tunisia
- Yugoslavia

=== Draw ===
- Venue: Centro Tennis Cassa di Risparmio, San Marino, San Marino
- Date: 10–14 May

Group A

	MKD	BUL	GEO	TUN	CMR	RR; W–L	Match; W–L	Set; W–L	Standings
Macedonia		2–1	2–1	3–0	3–0	4–0	10–2 (83%)	21–7 (75%)	1
Bulgaria	1–2		2–0	3–0	3–0	3–1	9–2 (82%)	18–7 (72%)	2
Georgia	1–2	0–2		3–0	3–0	2–2	7–4 (64%)	16–9 (64%)	3
Tunisia	0–3	0–3	0–3		2–0	1–3	2–9 (18%)	6–19 (24%)	4
Cameroon	0–3	0–3	0–3	0–2		0–4	0–11 (0%)	3–22 (12%)	5

Group B

	FRY	GRE	SMR	MDA	TOG	BEN	RR; W–L	Match; W–L	Set; W–L	Standings
Yugoslavia		2–1	3–0	3–0	3–0	3–0	5–0	14–1 (93%)	29–3 (91%)	1
Greece	1–2		2–1	3–0	3–0	3–0	4–1	12–3 (80%)	24–9 (73%)	2
San Marino	0–3	1–2		2–1	3–0	2–1	3–2	8–7 (53%)	17–15 (53%)	3
Moldova	0–3	0–3	1–2		3–0	2–1	2–3	6–9 (40%)	15–19 (44%)	4
Togo	0–3	0–3	0–3	0–3		3–0	1–4	3–12 (20%)	8–25 (24%)	5
Benin	0–3	0–3	1–2	1–2	0–3		0–5	2–13 (13%)	6–28 (18%)	6

- Macedonia and Yugoslavia promoted to Group II in 1996.

== Group A ==
=== Cameroon vs. Macedonia ===
Cameroon
0
Centro Tennis Cassa di Risparmio, San Marino, San Marino
10 May 1995

Macedonia
3

			1	2	3
1	(Cameroon) (North Macedonia)	Joseph Oyebog; Zoran Ševčenko	5; 7	3; 6
2	(Cameroon) (North Macedonia)	Angelin Mvogo; Aleksandar Kitinov	3; 6	6; 4	2; 6
3	(Cameroon) (North Macedonia)	Jules Ekono / Lionel Kemajou; Aleksandar Kitinov / Zoran Ševčenko	3; 6	2; 6

=== Georgia vs. Tunisia ===
Georgia
3
Centro Tennis Cassa di Risparmio, San Marino, San Marino
10 May 1995

Tunisia
0

			1	2	3
1	(Georgia (country)) (Tunisia)	David Katcharava; Adel Lahdhiri	6; 3	4; 6	6; 4
2	(Georgia (country)) (Tunisia)	Vladimir Gabrichidze; Sami Sidia	6; 2	6; 3
3	(Georgia (country)) (Tunisia)	Vladimir Gabrichidze / Vladimir Margalitadze; Adel Lahdhiri / Sami Sidia	7^{7} 6^{1}	6; 4

=== Bulgaria vs. Cameroon ===
Bulgaria
3
Centro Tennis Cassa di Risparmio, San Marino, San Marino
11 May 1995

Cameroon
0

			1	2	3
1	(Bulgaria) (Cameroon)	Mihail Kanev; Lionel Kemajou	6; 4	6; 4
2	(Bulgaria) (Cameroon)	Mark Markov; Angelin Mvogo	6; 2	7^{7} 6^{4}
3	(Bulgaria) (Cameroon)	Georgi Arabov / Radoslav Radev; Lionel Kemajou / Joseph Oyebog	7^{7} 6^{0}	4; 6	9; 7

=== Macedonia vs. Tunisia ===
Macedonia
3
Centro Tennis Cassa di Risparmio, San Marino, San Marino
11 May 1995

Tunisia
0

			1	2	3
1	(North Macedonia) (Tunisia)	Zoran Ševčenko; Adel Lahdhiri	6; 3	6; 1
2	(North Macedonia) (Tunisia)	Aleksandar Kitinov; Sami Sidia	6; 2	6; 4
3	(North Macedonia) (Tunisia)	Aleksandar Kitinov / Zoran Ševčenko; Adel Lahdhiri / Sami Sidia	6; 1	6; 2

=== Bulgaria vs. Tunisia ===
Bulgaria
3
Centro Tennis Cassa di Risparmio, San Marino, San Marino
12 May 1995

Tunisia
0

			1	2	3
1	(Bulgaria) (Tunisia)	Radoslav Radev; Adel Lahdhiri	6; 4	6; 3
2	(Bulgaria) (Tunisia)	Mark Markov; Sami Sidia	6; 4	6; 3
3	(Bulgaria) (Tunisia)	Georgi Arabov / Radoslav Radev; Adel Lahdhiri / Sami Sidia	6^{7} 7^{9}	6; 2	6; 3

=== Georgia vs. Macedonia ===
Georgia
1
Centro Tennis Cassa di Risparmio, San Marino, San Marino
12 May 1995

Macedonia
2

			1	2	3
1	(Georgia (country)) (North Macedonia)	David Katcharava; Zoran Ševčenko	6; 3	2; 6	6; 8
2	(Georgia (country)) (North Macedonia)	Vladimir Gabrichidze; Aleksandar Kitinov	6; 3	6; 4
3	(Georgia (country)) (North Macedonia)	Vladimir Gabrichidze / David Katcharava; Aleksandar Kitinov / Zoran Ševčenko	7^{7} 6^{4}	4; 6	4; 6

=== Bulgaria vs. Macedonia ===
Bulgaria
1
Centro Tennis Cassa di Risparmio, San Marino, San Marino
13 May 1995

Macedonia
2

			1	2	3
1	(Bulgaria) (North Macedonia)	Radoslav Radev; Zoran Ševčenko	1; 6	3; 6
2	(Bulgaria) (North Macedonia)	Mark Markov; Aleksandar Kitinov	6; 1	6^{3} 7^{7}	10; 8
3	(Bulgaria) (North Macedonia)	Mark Markov / Radoslav Radev; Aleksandar Kitinov / Zoran Ševčenko	4; 6	1; 6

=== Cameroon vs. Georgia ===
Cameroon
0
Centro Tennis Cassa di Risparmio, San Marino, San Marino
13 May 1995

Georgia
3

			1	2	3
1	(Cameroon) (Georgia (country))	Lionel Kemajou; Vladimir Margalitadze	4; 6	1; 6
2	(Cameroon) (Georgia (country))	Angelin Mvogo; Vladimir Gabrichidze	3; 6	2; 6
3	(Cameroon) (Georgia (country))	Lionel Kemajou / Angelin Mvogo; Anatoli Akhaladze / Vladimir Margalitadze	3; 6	4; 6

=== Bulgaria vs. Georgia ===
Bulgaria
2
Centro Tennis Cassa di Risparmio, San Marino, San Marino
14 May 1995

Georgia
0

			1	2	3
1	(Bulgaria) (Georgia (country))	Georgi Arabov; Anatoli Akhaladze	6; 4	6; 4
2	(Bulgaria) (Georgia (country))	Mark Markov; Vladimir Margalitadze	6; 1	6; 1
3	(Bulgaria) (Georgia (country))					not played

=== Cameroon vs. Tunisia ===
Cameroon
0
Centro Tennis Cassa di Risparmio, San Marino, San Marino
14 May 1995

Tunisia
2

			1	2	3
1	(Cameroon) (Tunisia)	Jules Ekono; Adel Lahdhiri	6; 1	3; 6	5; 7
2	(Cameroon) (Tunisia)	Joseph Oyebog; Sami Sidia	2; 6	4; 6
3	(Cameroon) (Tunisia)					not played

== Group B ==
=== San Marino vs. Greece ===
San Marino
1
Centro Tennis Cassa di Risparmio, San Marino, San Marino
10 May 1995

Greece
2

			1	2	3
1	(San Marino) (Greece)	Massimiliano Rosti; Pantelis Moschoutis	3; 6	6^{5} 7^{7}
2	(San Marino) (Greece)	Domenico Vicini; Solon Peppas	6; 3	6; 4
3	(San Marino) (Greece)	Gabriel Francini / Domenico Vicini; Konstantinos Efraimoglou / Anastasios Vasiliadis	1; 6	1; 6

=== Benin vs. Yugoslavia ===
Benin
0
Centro Tennis Cassa di Risparmio, San Marino, San Marino
10 May 1995

Yugoslavia
3

			1	2	3
1	(Benin) (Federal Republic of Yugoslavia)	Christophe Pognon; Nenad Zimonjić	0; 6	0; 6
2	(Benin) (Federal Republic of Yugoslavia)	Alphonse Gandonou; Bojan Vujić	1; 6	2; 6
3	(Benin) (Federal Republic of Yugoslavia)	Jean-Marie da Silva / Alphonse Gandonou; Nebojša Đorđević / Nenad Zimonjić	2; 6	1; 6

=== Moldova vs. Togo ===
Moldova
3
Centro Tennis Cassa di Risparmio, San Marino, San Marino
10 May 1995

Togo
0

			1	2	3
1	(Moldova) (Togo)	Oleg Sinic; Komi Akli	6; 3	6; 1
2	(Moldova) (Togo)	Iurie Gorban; Ali Agnamba	4; 6	6; 0	6; 4
3	(Moldova) (Togo)	Viorel Galajou / Iurie Gorban; Didier Kunkel / Jean-Kome Loglo	6; 4	7^{7} 6^{4}

=== San Marino vs. Togo ===
San Marino
3
Centro Tennis Cassa di Risparmio, San Marino, San Marino
11 May 1995

Togo
0

			1	2	3
1	(San Marino) (Togo)	Massimiliano Rosti; Didier Kunkel	6; 2	6; 4
2	(San Marino) (Togo)	Domenico Vicini; Jean-Kome Loglo	6; 1	6; 4
3	(San Marino) (Togo)	Gabriel Francini / Massimiliano Rosti; Ali Agnamba / Jean-Kome Loglo	7^{8} 6^{6}	3; 6	6; 3

=== Benin vs. Moldova ===
Benin
1
Centro Tennis Cassa di Risparmio, San Marino, San Marino
11 May 1995

Moldova
2

			1	2	3
1	(Benin) (Moldova)	Christophe Pognon; Oleg Sinic	7^{7} 6^{4}	1; 6	3; 6
2	(Benin) (Moldova)	Alphonse Gandonou; Iurie Gorban	1; 6	1; 6
3	(Benin) (Moldova)	Jean-Marie da Silva / Alphonse Gandonou; Viorel Galajou / Iurie Gorban	4; 6	6; 3	6; 4

=== Greece vs. Yugoslavia ===
Greece
1
Centro Tennis Cassa di Risparmio, San Marino, San Marino
11 May 1995

Yugoslavia
2

			1	2	3
1	(Greece) (Federal Republic of Yugoslavia)	Pantelis Moschoutis; Nenad Zimonjić	6; 3	4; 6	6; 4
2	(Greece) (Federal Republic of Yugoslavia)	Solon Peppas; Bojan Vujić	6^{2} 7^{7}	3; 6
3	(Greece) (Federal Republic of Yugoslavia)	Konstantinos Efraimoglou / Anastasios Vasiliadis; Nebojša Đorđević / Nenad Zimonjić	1; 6	6^{2} 7^{7}

=== San Marino vs. Yugoslavia ===
San Marino
0
Centro Tennis Cassa di Risparmio, San Marino, San Marino
12 May 1995

Yugoslavia
3

			1	2	3
1	(San Marino) (Federal Republic of Yugoslavia)	Gabriel Francini; Goran Mihajlović	6; 2	2; 6	4; 6
2	(San Marino) (Federal Republic of Yugoslavia)	Domenico Vicini; Bojan Vujić	1; 6	0; 6
3	(San Marino) (Federal Republic of Yugoslavia)	Massimiliano Rosti / Domenico Vicini; Nebojša Đorđević / Nenad Zimonjić	0; 6	1; 6

=== Benin vs. Togo ===
Benin
0
Centro Tennis Cassa di Risparmio, San Marino, San Marino
12 May 1995

Togo
3

			1	2	3
1	(Benin) (Togo)	Christophe Pognon; Didier Kunkel	6^{4} 7^{7}	5; 7
2	(Benin) (Togo)	Alphonse Gandonou; Jean-Kome Loglo	4; 6	2; 6
3	(Benin) (Togo)	Jean-Marie da Silva / Alphonse Gandonou; Komi Akli / Jean-Kome Loglo	6; 3	6^{7} 7^{9}	1; 6

=== Greece vs. Moldova ===
Greece
3
Centro Tennis Cassa di Risparmio, San Marino, San Marino
12 May 1995

Moldova
0

			1	2	3
1	(Greece) (Moldova)	Pantelis Moschoutis; Oleg Sinic	6; 2	6; 4
2	(Greece) (Moldova)	Solon Peppas; Iurie Gorban	6^{4} 7^{7}	7^{7} 6^{5}	6; 4
3	(Greece) (Moldova)	Konstantinos Efraimoglou / Anastasios Vasiliadis; Iurie Gorban / Denis Savitskii	3; 6	6; 2	6; 1

=== San Marino vs. Benin ===
San Marino
2
Centro Tennis Cassa di Risparmio, San Marino, San Marino
13 May 1995

Benin
1

			1	2	3
1	(San Marino) (Benin)	Massimiliano Rosti; Christophe Pognon	6; 3	6; 1
2	(San Marino) (Benin)	Domenico Vicini; Alphonse Gandonou	6; 4	6; 3
3	(San Marino) (Benin)	Christian Rosti / Massimiliano Rosti; Jean-Marie da Silva / Alphonse Gandonou	6; 3	5; 7	2; 6

=== Greece vs. Togo ===
Greece
3
Centro Tennis Cassa di Risparmio, San Marino, San Marino
13 May 1995

Togo
0

			1	2	3
1	(Greece) (Togo)	Pantelis Moschoutis; Ali Agnamba	6; 4	6; 2
2	(Greece) (Togo)	Solon Peppas; Didier Kunkel	6; 1	6; 2
3	(Greece) (Togo)	Konstantinos Efraimoglou / Anastasios Vasiliadis; Ali Agnamba / Komi Akli	7^{7} 6^{4}	6; 2

=== Moldova vs. Yugoslavia ===
Moldova
0
Centro Tennis Cassa di Risparmio, San Marino, San Marino
13 May 1995

Yugoslavia
3

			1	2	3
1	(Moldova) (Federal Republic of Yugoslavia)	Oleg Sinic; Nebojša Đorđević	3; 6	4; 6
2	(Moldova) (Federal Republic of Yugoslavia)	Iurie Gorban; Bojan Vujić	1; 6	2; 6
3	(Moldova) (Federal Republic of Yugoslavia)	Viorel Galajou / Denis Savitskii; Nebojša Đorđević / Nenad Zimonjić	1; 6	2; 6

=== San Marino vs. Moldova ===
San Marino
2
Centro Tennis Cassa di Risparmio, San Marino, San Marino
14 May 1995

Moldova
1

			1	2	3
1	(San Marino) (Moldova)	Massimiliano Rosti; Denis Savitskii	6; 2	1; 6	6; 8
2	(San Marino) (Moldova)	Domenico Vicini; Oleg Sinic	6; 0	6; 3
3	(San Marino) (Moldova)	Massimiliano Rosti / Domenico Vicini; Denis Savitskii / Oleg Sinic				w/o

=== Benin vs. Greece ===
Benin
0
Centro Tennis Cassa di Risparmio, San Marino, San Marino
14 May 1995

Greece
3

			1	2	3
1	(Benin) (Greece)	Toussaint Gandonou; Pantelis Moschoutis	0; 6	0; 6
2	(Benin) (Greece)	Christophe Pognon; Solon Peppas	1; 6	0; 6
3	(Benin) (Greece)	Jean-Marie da Silva / Alphonse Gandonou; Konstantinos Efraimoglou / Anastasios Vasiliadis	2; 6	3; 6

=== Togo vs. Yugoslavia ===
Togo
0
Centro Tennis Cassa di Risparmio, San Marino, San Marino
14 May 1995

Yugoslavia
3

			1	2	3
1	(Togo) (Federal Republic of Yugoslavia)	Komi Akli; Nebojša Đorđević	0; 6	1; 6
2	(Togo) (Federal Republic of Yugoslavia)	Ali Agnamba; Nenad Zimonjić	1; 6	6^{6} 7^{8}
3	(Togo) (Federal Republic of Yugoslavia)	Ali Agnamba / Komi Akli; Nebojša Đorđević / Nenad Zimonjić	1; 6	0; 6
