= 2000 Davis Cup Europe/Africa Zone Group III – Zone B =

International tennis competition

The Europe/Africa Zone was one of the three zones of the regional Davis Cup competition in 2000.

In the Europe/Africa Zone there were four different tiers, called groups, in which teams competed against each other to advance to the upper tier. The top two teams in Group III advanced to the Europe/Africa Zone Group II in 2001, whereas the bottom two teams were relegated to the Europe/Africa Zone Group IV in 2001.

== Participating nations ==
- Armenia
- Benin
- Iceland
- Macedonia
- Madagascar
- Moldova
- Nigeria
- Senegal

=== Draw ===
- Venue: Association Culturelle et Sportive d'Ambohidahy, Antananarivo, Madagascar
- Date: 24–28 May

Group A

	MDA	ISL	SEN	BEN	RR; W–L	Match; W–L	Set; W–L	Standings
Moldova		3–0	3–0	3–0	3–0	9–0 (100%)	18–1 (95%)	1
Iceland	0–3		2–1	3–0	2–1	5–4 (56%)	10–8 (56%)	2
Senegal	0–3	1–2		2–1	1–2	3–6 (33%)	6–12 (33%)	3
Benin	0–3	0–3	1–2		0–3	1–8 (11%)	3–16 (16%)	4

Group B

	ARM	MKD	MAD	NGR	RR; W–L	Match; W–L	Set; W–L	Standings
Armenia		2–1	3–0	2–1	3–0	7–2 (78%)	14–6 (70%)	1
Macedonia	1–2		2–1	3–0	2–1	6–3 (67%)	14–9 (61%)	2
Madagascar	0–3	1–2		2–1	1–2	3–6 (33%)	8–13 (38%)	3
Nigeria	1–2	0–3	1–2		0–3	2–7 (22%)	6–14 (30%)	4

1st to 4th place play-offs

3rd-4th Play-off
B2	Iceland	2
A2	Macedonia	1

Semifinals
A1	Armenia	3
B2	Iceland	0
A2	Macedonia	1
B1	Moldova	2

Final
A1	Armenia	1
B1	Moldova	2

5th to 8th place play-offs

7th-8th Play-off
A3	Senegal	0
A4	Benin	3

5th-8th Play-offs
A3	Senegal	1
B4	Nigeria	2
A4	Benin	0
B3	Madagascar	3

5th-6th Play-off
B4	Nigeria	2
B3	Madagascar	1

=== Final standings ===
Rank	Team
1	Moldova
2	Armenia
3	Iceland
4	Macedonia
5	Nigeria
6	Madagascar
7	Benin
8	Senegal

- Moldova and Armenia promoted to Group II in 2001.
- Benin and Senegal relegated to Group IV in 2001.

== Round robin ==
=== Group A ===
==== Moldova vs. Senegal ====
Moldova
3
Association Culturelle et Sportive d'Ambohidahy, Antananarivo, Madagascar
24 May 2000

Senegal
0

			1	2	3
1	(Moldova) (Senegal)	Iurie Gorban; Diadji Ka	6; 2	6; 3
2	(Moldova) (Senegal)	Evgueni Plougarev; Daouda Ndiaye	6; 3	7^{7} 6^{3}
3	(Moldova) (Senegal)	Iurie Gorban / Evgueni Plougarev; Diadji Ka / Daouda Ndiaye	7; 5	7; 5

==== Iceland vs. Benin ====
Iceland
3
Association Culturelle et Sportive d'Ambohidahy, Antananarivo, Madagascar
24 May 2000

Benin
0

			1	2	3
1	(Iceland) (Benin)	Rafn Kumar Bonifacius; Armand Segodo	6; 3	6; 0
2	(Iceland) (Benin)	Arnar Sigurðsson; Alphonse Gandonou	6; 3	6; 1
3	(Iceland) (Benin)	Davíð Halldórsson / Arnar Sigurðsson; Jean-Marie da Silva / Alphonse Gandonou	6; 4	6; 4

==== Moldova vs. Iceland ====
Moldova
3
Association Culturelle et Sportive d'Ambohidahy, Antananarivo, Madagascar
25 May 2000

Iceland
0

			1	2	3
1	(Moldova) (Iceland)	Iurie Gorban; Davíð Halldórsson	6; 0	6; 0
2	(Moldova) (Iceland)	Evgueni Plougarev; Arnar Sigurðsson	6; 3	7; 5
3	(Moldova) (Iceland)	Andrei Gorban / Victor Ribas; Davíð Halldórsson / Arnar Sigurðsson	6; 4	6; 3

==== Senegal vs. Benin ====
Senegal
2
Association Culturelle et Sportive d'Ambohidahy, Antananarivo, Madagascar
25 May 2000

Benin
1

			1	2	3
1	(Senegal) (Benin)	Wael Zeidan; Sourou Gandonou	6; 3	6; 3
2	(Senegal) (Benin)	Daouda Ndiaye; Alphonse Gandonou	6; 3	6; 2
3	(Senegal) (Benin)	Diadji Ka / Wael Zeidan; Alphonse Gandonou / Armand Segodo	3; 6	4; 6

==== Moldova vs. Benin ====
Moldova
3
Association Culturelle et Sportive d'Ambohidahy, Antananarivo, Madagascar
26 May 2000

Benin
0

			1	2	3
1	(Moldova) (Benin)	Iurie Gorban; Armand Segodo	6; 2	6; 3
2	(Moldova) (Benin)	Evgueni Plougarev; Sourou Gandonou	6; 2	6; 2
3	(Moldova) (Benin)	Andrei Gorban / Victor Ribas; Jean-Marie da Silva / Alphonse Gandonou	6; 4	4; 6	6; 2

==== Iceland vs. Senegal ====
Iceland
2
Association Culturelle et Sportive d'Ambohidahy, Antananarivo, Madagascar
26 May 2000

Senegal
1

			1	2	3
1	(Iceland) (Senegal)	Rafn Kumar Bonifacius; Wael Zeidan	6; 4	7^{7} 6^{3}
2	(Iceland) (Senegal)	Arnar Sigurðsson; Daouda Ndiaye	6; 4	6; 0
3	(Iceland) (Senegal)	Davíð Halldórsson / Jón Axel Jónsson; Daouda Ndiaye / Wael Zeidan	2; 6	6^{4} 7^{7}

=== Group B ===
==== Armenia vs. Madagascar ====
Armenia
3
Association Culturelle et Sportive d'Ambohidahy, Antananarivo, Madagascar
24 May 2000

Madagascar
0

			1	2	3
1	(Armenia) (Madagascar)	Tsolak Gevorgyan; Alexis Rafidison	6; 4	3; 6	6; 4
2	(Armenia) (Madagascar)	Sargis Sargsian; Lalaina Ratsimbazafy	7^{7} 6^{3}	6; 0
3	(Armenia) (Madagascar)	Tsolak Gevorgyan / Sargis Sargsian; Harivony Andrianafetra / Jean-Marc Randriamanalina	6; 4	6; 1

==== Macedonia vs. Nigeria ====
Macedonia
3
Association Culturelle et Sportive d'Ambohidahy, Antananarivo, Madagascar
24 May 2000

Nigeria
0

			1	2	3
1	(North Macedonia) (Nigeria)	Predrag Rusevski; Ganiyu Adenekan	4; 6	6; 1	6; 4
2	(North Macedonia) (Nigeria)	Zoran Ševčenko; Sule Ladipo	5; 7	7; 5	6; 2
3	(North Macedonia) (Nigeria)	Kristian Mitrovski / Predrag Rusevski; Ganiyu Adenekan / Sule Ladipo	6; 3	6; 2

==== Armenia vs. Macedonia ====
Armenia
2
Association Culturelle et Sportive d'Ambohidahy, Antananarivo, Madagascar
25 May 2000

Macedonia
1

			1	2	3
1	(Armenia) (North Macedonia)	Tsolak Gevorgyan; Zoran Ševčenko	3; 6	3; 6
2	(Armenia) (North Macedonia)	Sargis Sargsian; Kristian Mitrovski	2; 6	6; 3	6; 2
3	(Armenia) (North Macedonia)	Tsolak Gevorgyan / Sargis Sargsian; Predrag Rusevski / Zoran Ševčenko	6; 1	6; 1

==== Madagascar vs. Nigeria ====
Madagascar
2
Association Culturelle et Sportive d'Ambohidahy, Antananarivo, Madagascar
25 May 2000

Nigeria
1

			1	2	3
1	(Madagascar) (Nigeria)	Alexis Rafidison; Ganiyu Adenekan	6; 2	6; 1
2	(Madagascar) (Nigeria)	Jean-Marc Randriamanalina; Sule Ladipo	6^{6} 7^{8}	3; 6
3	(Madagascar) (Nigeria)	Harivony Andrianafetra / Alexis Rafidison; Ganiyu Adenekan / Sule Ladipo	7^{9} 6^{7}	6; 3

==== Armenia vs. Nigeria ====
Armenia
2
Association Culturelle et Sportive d'Ambohidahy, Antananarivo, Madagascar
26 May 2000

Nigeria
1

			1	2	3
1	(Armenia) (Nigeria)	Harutyun Sofyan; Ganiyu Adenekan	5; 7	5; 7
2	(Armenia) (Nigeria)	Sargis Sargsian; Sule Ladipo	6; 3	6; 3
3	(Armenia) (Nigeria)	Tsolak Gevorgyan / Sargis Sargsian; Ganiyu Adenekan / Sule Ladipo	6; 4	6; 4

==== Macedonia vs. Madagascar ====
Macedonia
2
Association Culturelle et Sportive d'Ambohidahy, Antananarivo, Madagascar
26 May 2000

Madagascar
1

			1	2	3
1	(North Macedonia) (Madagascar)	Zoran Ševčenko; Alexis Rafidison	6; 4	6; 3
2	(North Macedonia) (Madagascar)	Kristian Mitrovski; Jean-Marc Randriamanalina	6; 2	3; 6	4; 6
3	(North Macedonia) (Madagascar)	Predrag Rusevski / Zoran Ševčenko; Harivony Andrianafetra / Alexis Rafidison	6; 3	1; 6	6; 1

== 1st to 4th place play-offs ==
=== Semifinals ===
==== Iceland vs. Armenia ====
Iceland
0
Association Culturelle et Sportive d'Ambohidahy, Antananarivo, Madagascar
27 May 2000

Armenia
3

			1	2	3
1	(Iceland) (Armenia)	Rafn Kumar Bonifacius; Tsolak Gevorgyan	6^{5} 7^{7}	5; 7
2	(Iceland) (Armenia)	Arnar Sigurðsson; Sargis Sargsian	3; 6	2; 6
3	(Iceland) (Armenia)	Davíð Halldórsson / Arnar Sigurðsson; Hayk Hakobyan / Harutyun Sofyan	7^{7} 6^{5}	3; 6	4; 6

==== Moldova vs. Macedonia ====
Moldova
2
Association Culturelle et Sportive d'Ambohidahy, Antananarivo, Madagascar
27 May 2000

Macedonia
1

			1	2	3
1	(Moldova) (North Macedonia)	Iurie Gorban; Predrag Rusevski	7; 5	3; 6	6; 4
2	(Moldova) (North Macedonia)	Evgueni Plougarev; Zoran Ševčenko	7; 5	1; 6	7; 5
3	(Moldova) (North Macedonia)	Andrei Gorban / Victor Ribas; Kristian Mitrovski / Predrag Rusevski	3; 6	1; 6

=== Final ===
==== Moldova vs. Armenia ====
Moldova
2
Association Culturelle et Sportive d'Ambohidahy, Antananarivo, Madagascar
28 May 2000

Armenia
1

			1	2	3
1	(Moldova) (Armenia)	Andrei Gorban; Harutyun Sofyan	4; 6	7^{7} 6^{5}	7; 5
2	(Moldova) (Armenia)	Victor Ribas; Tsolak Gevorgyan	6; 4	6; 4
3	(Moldova) (Armenia)	Andrei Gorban / Victor Ribas; Hayk Hakobyan / Harutyun Sofyan	7; 5	5; 7	4; 6

=== 3rd to 4th play-off ===
==== Iceland vs. Macedonia ====
Iceland
2
Association Culturelle et Sportive d'Ambohidahy, Antananarivo, Madagascar
28 May 2000

Macedonia
1

			1	2	3
1	(Iceland) (North Macedonia)	Rafn Kumar Bonifacius; Zoran Ševčenko	2; 6	2; 6
2	(Iceland) (North Macedonia)	Arnar Sigurðsson; Kristian Mitrovski	6; 3	6; 3
3	(Iceland) (North Macedonia)	Rafn Kumar Bonifacius / Arnar Sigurðsson; Kristian Mitrovski / Predrag Rusevski	6; 3	6; 4

== 5th to 8th place play-offs ==
=== 5th to 8th play-offs ===
==== Senegal vs. Nigeria ====
Senegal
1
Association Culturelle et Sportive d'Ambohidahy, Antananarivo, Madagascar
26 May 2000

Nigeria
2

			1	2	3
1	(Senegal) (Nigeria)	Wael Zeidan; Ganiyu Adenekan	6; 4	1; 6	3; 6
2	(Senegal) (Nigeria)	Daouda Ndiaye; Sule Ladipo	2; 6	5; 7
3	(Senegal) (Nigeria)	Daouda Ndiaye / Wael Zeidan; Ganiyu Adenekan / Sule Ladipo				w/o

==== Benin vs. Madagascar ====
Benin
0
Association Culturelle et Sportive d'Ambohidahy, Antananarivo, Madagascar
27 May 2000

Madagascar
3

			1	2	3
1	(Benin) (Madagascar)	Armand Segodo; Alexis Rafidison	1; 6	2; 6
2	(Benin) (Madagascar)	Alphonse Gandonou; Lalaina Ratsimbazafy	3; 6	2; 6
3	(Benin) (Madagascar)	Alphonse Gandonou / Armand Segodo; Jean-Marc Randriamanalina / Lalaina Ratsimbazafy	6; 4	3; 6	4; 6

=== 5th to 6th play-off ===
==== Nigeria vs. Madagascar ====
Nigeria
2
Association Culturelle et Sportive d'Ambohidahy, Antananarivo, Madagascar
28 May 2000

Madagascar
1

			1	2	3
1	(Nigeria) (Madagascar)	Ganiyu Adenekan; Alexis Rafidison	1; 6	1; 0		retired
2	(Nigeria) (Madagascar)	Sule Ladipo; Lalaina Ratsimbazafy	6; 1	6; 3
3	(Nigeria) (Madagascar)	Sule Ladipo / Bulus Hussaini; Harivony Andrianafetra / Jean-Marc Randriamanalina	6; 2	6; 4

=== 7th to 8th play-off ===
==== Senegal vs. Benin ====
Senegal
0
Association Culturelle et Sportive d'Ambohidahy, Antananarivo, Madagascar
28 May 2000

Benin
3

			1	2	3
1	(Senegal) (Benin)	Wael Zeidan; Armand Segodo	4; 6	7^{7} 6^{3}	3; 6
2	(Senegal) (Benin)	Daouda Ndiaye; Alphonse Gandonou	5; 6			retired
3	(Senegal) (Benin)	Youssou Berthé / Diadji Ka; Alphonse Gandonou / Armand Segodo	3; 6	1; 6
