= Moldova Davis Cup team =

National tennis team

Moldova
- Captain: Andrei Ciumac
- ITF ranking: 86 (9 February 2026)
- First year: 1995
- Years played: 30
- Ties played (W–L): 123 (71–52)
- Best finish: Europe/Africa Zone Group II; Third round (2013) and (2014)
- Most total wins: Radu Albot (48–18)
- Most singles wins: Radu Albot (34–8)
- Most doubles wins: Andrei Ciumac (19–16)
- Most ties played: Andrei Ciumac (50)
- Most years played: Andrei Ciumac (16)

The Moldova men's national tennis team represents Moldova in Davis Cup tennis competition and is governed by the Moldovan Tennis Federation.

== History ==
Moldova made their Davis Cup debut in 1995. Their best performances came in the early-2010s when they reached the Europe/Africa Zone Group II third round in two consecutive years – 2013 and 2014. Moldovan players previously represented the Soviet Union.

== Current team ==
- Radu Albot
- Ilya Snițari
- Andrei Gorban
- Mathys Braun

== Results ==
=== 1990s ===
Year	Competition	Date	Location	Opponent	Score	Result
1995	Europe/Africa Zone Group III, Round robin	10 May	San Marino (SMR)	Togo	3–0	Win
1995	Europe/Africa Zone Group III, Round robin	11 May	San Marino (SMR)	Benin	2–1	Win
1995	Europe/Africa Zone Group III, Round robin	12 May	San Marino (SMR)	Greece	0–3	Loss
1995	Europe/Africa Zone Group III, Round robin	13 May	San Marino (SMR)	FR Yugoslavia	0–3	Loss
1995	Europe/Africa Zone Group III, Round robin	14 May	San Marino (SMR)	San Marino	1–2	Loss
1996	Europe/Africa Zone Group III, Round robin	8 January	Nairobi (KEN)	Estonia	1–2	Loss
1996	Europe/Africa Zone Group III, Round robin	9 January	Nairobi (KEN)	Cyprus	2–1	Win
1996	Europe/Africa Zone Group III, Round robin	10 January	Nairobi (KEN)	Cameroon	1–2	Loss
1996	Europe/Africa Zone Group III, Round robin	11 January	Nairobi (KEN)	Zambia	2–1	Win
1996	Europe/Africa Zone Group III, Round robin	12 January	Nairobi (KEN)	Djibouti	3–0	Win
1996	Europe/Africa Zone Group III, Round robin	13 January	Nairobi (KEN)	Ireland	0–3	Loss
1997	Europe/Africa Zone Group III, Round robin	21 May	Plovdiv (BUL)	Cameroon	3–0	Win
1997	Europe/Africa Zone Group III, Round robin	22 May	Plovdiv (BUL)	Algeria	3–0	Win
1997	Europe/Africa Zone Group III, Round robin	23 May	Plovdiv (BUL)	Monaco	0–3	Loss
1997	Europe/Africa Zone Group III, 1st to 4th play-off	24 May	Plovdiv (BUL)	Bulgaria	0–3	Loss
1997	Europe/Africa Zone Group III, 3rd to 4th play-off	25 May	Plovdiv (BUL)	Estonia	1–2	Loss
1998	Europe/Africa Zone Group III, Round robin	20 May	Skopje (MKD)	Lithuania	2–1	Win
1998	Europe/Africa Zone Group III, Round robin	21 May	Skopje (MKD)	Macedonia	1–2	Loss
1998	Europe/Africa Zone Group III, Round robin	22 May	Skopje (MKD)	Tunisia	2–1	Win
1998	Europe/Africa Zone Group III, 5th to 8th play-off	23 May	Skopje (MKD)	San Marino	2–1	Win
1998	Europe/Africa Zone Group III, 5th to 6th play-off	24 May	Skopje (MKD)	Tunisia	1–2	Loss
1999	Europe/Africa Zone Group III, Round robin	9 June	Tallinn (EST)	Monaco	1–2	Loss
1999	Europe/Africa Zone Group III, Round robin	10 June	Tallinn (EST)	Zambia	3–0	Win
1999	Europe/Africa Zone Group III, Round robin	11 June	Tallinn (EST)	Estonia	2–1	Win
1999	Europe/Africa Zone Group III, 1st to 4th play-off	12 June	Tallinn (EST)	Lithuania	1–2	Loss
1999	Europe/Africa Zone Group III, 3rd to 4th play-off	13 June	Tallinn (EST)	Armenia	2–1	Win

=== 2000s ===
Year	Competition	Date	Location	Opponent	Score	Result
2000	Europe/Africa Zone Group III, Round robin	24 May	Antananarivo (MAD)	Senegal	3–0	Win
2000	Europe/Africa Zone Group III, Round robin	25 May	Antananarivo (MAD)	Iceland	3–0	Win
2000	Europe/Africa Zone Group III, Round robin	26 May	Antananarivo (MAD)	Benin	3–0	Win
2000	Europe/Africa Zone Group III, 1st to 4th play-off	27 May	Antananarivo (MAD)	Macedonia	2–1	Win
2000	Europe/Africa Zone Group III, 1st to 2nd play-off	28 May	Antananarivo (MAD)	Armenia	2–1	Win
2001	Europe/Africa Zone Group II, First round	27–29 April	Chișinău (MDA)	Armenia	2–3	Loss
2001	Europe/Africa Zone Group II, Relegation play-off	20–22 July	Chișinău (MDA)	Turkey	3–2	Win
2002	Europe/Africa Zone Group II, First round	3–5 May	Chișinău (MDA)	Denmark	0–5	Loss
2002	Europe/Africa Zone Group II, Relegation play-off	12–14 July	Cairo (EGY)	Egypt	0–5	Loss
2003	Europe/Africa Zone Group III, Round robin	11 June	Jūrmala (LAT)	Latvia	1–2	Loss
2003	Europe/Africa Zone Group III, Round robin	12 June	Jūrmala (LAT)	Macedonia	1–2	Loss
2003	Europe/Africa Zone Group III, Round robin	13 June	Jūrmala (LAT)	Azerbaijan	1–2	Loss
2003	Europe/Africa Zone Group III, 5th to 8th play-off	14 June	Jūrmala (LAT)	Bosnia and Herzegovina	3–0	Win
2003	Europe/Africa Zone Group III, 5th to 8th play-off	15 June	Jūrmala (LAT)	Turkey	0–2	Loss
2004	Europe/Africa Zone Group IV, Round robin	15 July	Chișinău (MDA)	Uganda	3–0	Win
2004	Europe/Africa Zone Group IV, Round robin	16 July	Chișinău (MDA)	Rwanda	3–0	Win
2004	Europe/Africa Zone Group IV, Round robin	16 July	Chișinău (MDA)	Bosnia and Herzegovina	1–2	Loss
2004	Europe/Africa Zone Group IV, 1st to 4th play-off	17 July	Chișinău (MDA)	Armenia	1–2	Loss
2004	Europe/Africa Zone Group IV, 1st to 4th play-off	18 July	Chișinău (MDA)	Mauritius	3–0	Win
2005	Europe/Africa Zone Group IV, Round robin	2 March	Kampala (UGA)	Djibouti	3–0	Win
2005	Europe/Africa Zone Group IV, Round robin	3 March	Kampala (UGA)	Malta	3–0	Win
2005	Europe/Africa Zone Group IV, Round robin	4 March	Kampala (UGA)	Benin	3–0	Win
2005	Europe/Africa Zone Group IV, Round robin	5 March	Kampala (UGA)	Botswana	2–1	Win
2006	Europe/Africa Zone Group III, Round robin	19 July	Banja Luka (BIH)	Bosnia and Herzegovina	1–2	Loss
2006	Europe/Africa Zone Group III, Round robin	20 July	Banja Luka (BIH)	Turkey	0–3	Loss
2006	Europe/Africa Zone Group III, Round robin	21 July	Banja Luka (BIH)	Monaco	1–2	Loss
2006	Europe/Africa Zone Group III, 5th to 8th play-off	22 July	Banja Luka (BIH)	Andorra	3–0	Win
2006	Europe/Africa Zone Group III, 5th to 8th play-off	23 July	Banja Luka (BIH)	Armenia	3–0	Win
2007	Europe/Africa Zone Group III, Round robin	9 May	Cairo (EGY)	Bosnia and Herzegovina	2–1	Win
2007	Europe/Africa Zone Group III, Round robin	10 May	Cairo (EGY)	Ireland	0–3	Loss
2007	Europe/Africa Zone Group III, Round robin	11 May	Cairo (EGY)	Lithuania	1–2	Loss
2007	Europe/Africa Zone Group III, 5th to 8th play-off	12 May	Cairo (EGY)	San Marino	3–0	Win
2007	Europe/Africa Zone Group III, 5th to 8th play-off	13 May	Cairo (EGY)	Iceland	2–1	Win
2008	Europe/Africa Zone Group III, Round robin	7 May	Yerevan (ARM)	Armenia	3–0	Win
2008	Europe/Africa Zone Group III, Round robin	8 May	Yerevan (ARM)	Norway	2–1	Win
2008	Europe/Africa Zone Group III, Round robin	9 May	Yerevan (ARM)	Andorra	3–0	Win
2008	Europe/Africa Zone Group III, 1st to 4th play-off	10 May	Yerevan (ARM)	Bosnia and Herzegovina	3–0	Win
2008	Europe/Africa Zone Group III, 1st to 4th play-off	11 May	Yerevan (ARM)	Lithuania	3–0	Win
2009	Europe/Africa Zone Group II, First round	6–8 March	Jūrmala (LAT)	Latvia	0–5	Loss
2009	Europe/Africa Zone Group II, Relegation play-off	10–12 July	Gödöllő (HUN)	Hungary	2–3	Loss

=== 2010s ===
Year	Competition	Date	Location	Opponent	Score	Result
2010	Europe Zone Group III, Round robin	10 May	Marousi (GRE)	San Marino	3–0	Win
2010	Europe Zone Group III, Round robin	11 May	Marousi (GRE)	Albania	3–0	Win
2010	Europe Zone Group III, Round robin	12 May	Marousi (GRE)	Armenia	3–0	Win
2010	Europe Zone Group III, Round robin	13 May	Marousi (GRE)	Greece	1–2	Loss
2010	Europe Zone Group III, Round robin	14 May	Marousi (GRE)	Montenegro	2–1	Win
2010	Europe Zone Group III, 1st to 4th play-off	15 May	Marousi (GRE)	Luxembourg	1–2	Loss
2011	Europe Zone Group III, Round robin	11 May	Skopje (MKD)	Malta	3–0	Win
2011	Europe Zone Group III, Round robin	13 May	Skopje (MKD)	Iceland	3–0	Win
2011	Europe Zone Group III, 1st to 4th play-off	14 May	Skopje (MKD)	Montenegro	2–1	Win
2012	Europe/Africa Zone Group II, First round	10–12 February	Minsk (BLR)	Belarus	1–4	Loss
2012	Europe/Africa Zone Group II, Relegation play-off	6–8 April	Istanbul (TUR)	Turkey	3–2	Win
2013	Europe/Africa Zone Group II, First round	1–3 February	Chișinău (MDA)	Hungary	3–2	Win
2013	Europe/Africa Zone Group II, Second round	5–7 April	Mostar (BIH)	Bosnia and Herzegovina	3–1	Win
2013	Europe/Africa Zone Group II, Third round	13–15 September	Chișinău (MDA)	Portugal	2–3	Loss
2014	Europe/Africa Zone Group II, First round	31 January–2 February	Chișinău (MDA)	Egypt	4–1	Win
2014	Europe/Africa Zone Group II, Second round	4–6 April	Chișinău (MDA)	Belarus	4–1	Win
2014	Europe/Africa Zone Group II, Third round	12–14 September	Kolding (DEN)	Denmark	2–3	Loss
2015	Europe/Africa Zone Group II, First round	6–8 March	Győr (HUN)	Hungary	1–4	Loss
2015	Europe/Africa Zone Group II, Relegation play-off	17–19 July	Harare (ZIM)	Zimbabwe	0–5	Loss
2016	Europe Zone Group III, Round robin	2 March	Tallinn (EST)	San Marino	3–0	Win
2016	Europe Zone Group III, Round robin	4 March	Tallinn (EST)	Malta	3–0	Win
2016	Europe Zone Group III, 1st to 4th play-off	5 March	Tallinn (EST)	Estonia	0–2	Loss
2017	Europe Zone Group III, Round robin	6 April	Sozopol (BUL)	Iceland	1–2	Loss
2017	Europe Zone Group III, Round robin	7 April	Sozopol (BUL)	Malta	2–1	Win
2017	Europe Zone Group III, Round robin	7–8 April	Sozopol (BUL)	Macedonia	1–2	Loss
2017	Europe Zone Group III, 5th to 8th play-off	8 April	Sozopol (BUL)	Liechtenstein	2–1	Win
2018	Europe Zone Group III, Round robin	4 April	Ulcinj (MNE)	Liechtenstein	3–0	Win
2018	Europe Zone Group III, Round robin	5 April	Ulcinj (MNE)	Malta	1–2	Loss
2018	Europe Zone Group III, Round robin	6 April	Ulcinj (MNE)	Kosovo	2–1	Win
2018	Europe Zone Group III, 3rd to 4th play-off	7 April	Ulcinj (MNE)	Greece	0–3	Loss

=== 2020s ===
Year	Competition	Date	Location	Opponent	Score	Result
2020–21	Europe Zone Group IV, Round robin	22 June	Skopje (MKD)	Andorra	3–0	Win
2020–21	Europe Zone Group IV, Round robin	24 June	Skopje (MKD)	Kosovo	3–0	Win
2020–21	Europe Zone Group IV, Round robin	25 June	Skopje (MKD)	San Marino	3–0	Win
2020–21	Europe Zone Group IV, Round robin	26 June	Skopje (MKD)	North Macedonia	1–2	Loss
2022	Europe Zone Group III, Round robin	22 June	Ulcinj (MNE)	Montenegro	2–1	Win
2022	Europe Zone Group III, Round robin	23 June	Ulcinj (MNE)	Luxembourg	1–2	Loss
2022	Europe Zone Group III, Round robin	24 June	Ulcinj (MNE)	North Macedonia	2–1	Win
2022	Europe Zone Group III, 3rd to 4th play-off	25 June	Ulcinj (MNE)	Cyprus	0–3	Loss
2023	Europe Zone Group III, Round robin	14 June	Larnaca (CYP)	Cyprus	3–0	Win
2023	Europe Zone Group III, Round robin	15 June	Larnaca (CYP)	North Macedonia	3–0	Win
2023	Europe Zone Group III, Round robin	16 June	Larnaca (CYP)	Malta	3–0	Win
2023	Europe Zone Group III, 1st to 2nd play-off	17 June	Larnaca (CYP)	Estonia	0–2	Loss
2024	World Group II Play-off	3–4 February	Montevideo (URU)	Uruguay	2–3	Loss
2024	Europe Zone Group III, Round robin	19 June	Ulcinj (MNE)	Kosovo	3–0	Win
2024	Europe Zone Group III, Round robin	20 June	Ulcinj (MNE)	Azerbaijan	3–0	Win
2024	Europe Zone Group III, Round robin	21 June	Ulcinj (MNE)	Cyprus	1–2	Loss
2024	Europe Zone Group III, 3rd to 4th play-off	22 June	Ulcinj (MNE)	Slovenia	1–2	Loss
2025	World Group II Play-off	1–2 February	Santa Tecla (ESA)	El Salvador	2–3	Loss
2025	Europe Zone Group III, Round robin	10 June	Skopje (MKD)	Armenia	3–0	Win
2025	Europe Zone Group III, Round robin	11 June	Skopje (MKD)	Malta	2–1	Win
2025	Europe Zone Group III, Round robin	12 June	Skopje (MKD)	North Macedonia	1–2	Loss
2025	Europe Zone Group III, Round robin	13 June	Skopje (MKD)	Latvia	1–2	Loss
2025	Europe Zone Group III, Round robin	14 June	Skopje (MKD)	Montenegro	0–3	Loss
2026	Europe Zone Group III, Round robin	10 June	Chișinău (MDA)	North Macedonia	2–1	Win
2026	Europe Zone Group III, Round robin	11 June	Chișinău (MDA)	Georgia	3–0	Win
2026	Europe Zone Group III, Round robin	12 June	Chișinău (MDA)	Kosovo	2–0	Win
2026	Europe Zone Group III, 1st to 2nd play-off	13 June	Chișinău (MDA)	Latvia	2–0	Win
2027	World Group II Play-off	February				

== Head-to-head record ==
As of 13 June 2026, following the tie against Latvia.

Africa

- Benin 3–0
- Zambia 2–0
- Djibouti 2–0
- Cameroon 1–1
- Tunisia 1–1
- Egypt 1–1
- Togo 1–0
- Algeria 1–0
- Senegal 1–0
- Uganda 1–0
- Rwanda 1–0
- Mauritius 1–0
- Botswana 1–0
- Zimbabwe 0–1

Europe

- North Macedonia 4–5
- Armenia 6–2
- Malta 6–1
- San Marino 5–1
- Bosnia and Herzegovina 4–2
- Estonia 1–4
- Kosovo 4–0
- Iceland 3–1
- Montenegro 3–1
- Lithuania 2–2
- Turkey 2–2
- Cyprus 2–2
- Latvia 1–3
- Andorra 3–0

- Hungary 1–2
- Monaco 0–3
- Greece 0–3
- Liechtenstein 2–0
- Belarus 1–1
- Azerbaijan 1–1
- Ireland 0–2
- Denmark 0–2
- Luxembourg 0–2
- Norway 1–0
- Albania 1–0
- Georgia 1–0
- Bulgaria 0–1
- Portugal 0–1

- Slovenia 0–1
- FR Yugoslavia 0–1

Americas

- Uruguay 0–1
- El Salvador 0–1

== See also ==
- Davis Cup
- Moldova Billie Jean King Cup team
