= Sebastien Swierk =

Australian tennis player

Sebastian Swierk
- Country (sports): Australia
- Born: 15 January 1979 (age 46)
- Plays: Right-handed
- Prize money: $26,426

Singles
- Highest ranking: No. 376 (27 July 2000)

Grand Slam singles results
- Australian Open: Q2 (1996)

Doubles
- Career record: 0–1
- Highest ranking: No. 263 (10 July 2000)

Grand Slam doubles results
- Australian Open: 1R (2000)

Sebastian Swierk (born 15 January 1979) is an Australian former professional tennis player.

Swierk, a Polish-born South Australian, reached career best ranking of 376 in singles and 263 in doubles. In 2000 he partnered with Chris Rae in the men's doubles main draw of the Australian Open.

== ITF Futures titles ==
=== Singles: (2) ===
No.	Date	Tournament	Surface	Opponent	Score
1.	Nov 1999	Australia F4, Barmera	Grass	(Australia) Dejan Petrovic	6–3, 6–3
2.	Jul 2000	Turkey F2, Istanbul	Hard	(France) Cedric Kauffmann	6–2, 6–3

=== Doubles: (3) ===
No.	Date	Tournament	Surface	Partner	Opponents	Score
1.	Nov 1999	Australia F3, Berri	Grass	(Australia) Chris Rae	(Australia) Paul Kilderry (Australia) Grant Silcock	6–3, 6–7, 7–6
2.	Jul 2000	Turkey F1, Istanbul	Hard	(Australia) Josh Tuckfield	(Spain) Angel-Jose Martin-Arroyo (Turkey) Efe Üstündağ	7–6^{(7–5)}, 6–3
3.	Jul 2000	Turkey F3, Istanbul	Hard	(Australia) Josh Tuckfield	(France) Cedric Kauffmann (Turkey) Efe Üstündağ	6–3, 7–5
