= Issam Jellali =

Tunisian tennis player (born 1981)

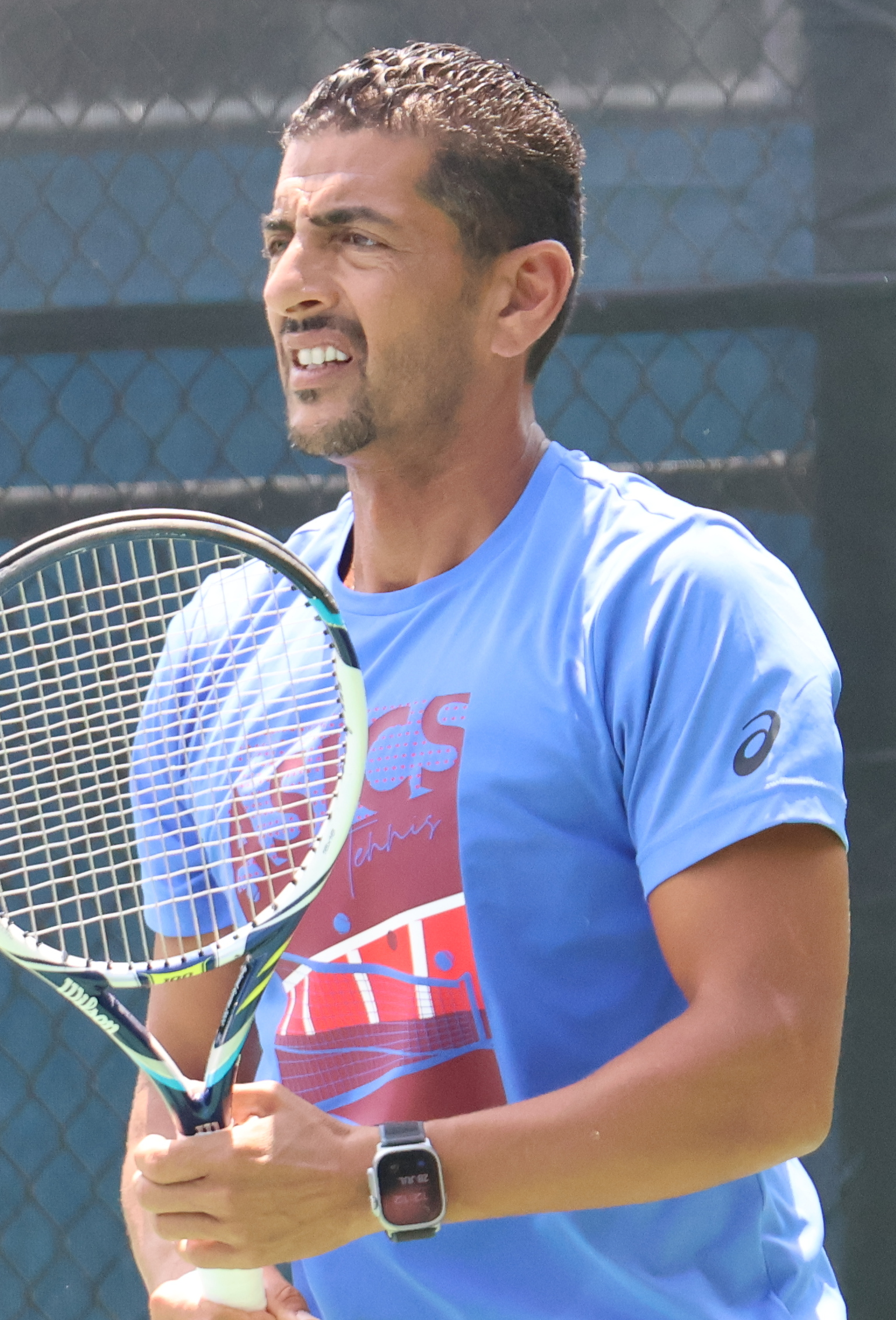
- Jellali at the 2024 Washington Open
- Native name: عصام جلالي
- Country (sports): Tunisia
- Residence: Dubai, United Arab Emirates
- Born: 22 March 1981 (age 45) Tunisia
- Plays: Right-handed (two-handed backhand)
- Prize money: $7,749

Singles
- Career titles: 0
- Highest ranking: No. 1111 (31 March 2003)

Doubles
- Highest ranking: No. 801 (1 March 2004)

Coaching career
- Ons Jabeur (2020–2025); Zeynep Sönmez (2026–present)

Issam Jellali (Arabic: عصام جلالي; born 22 March 1981) is a Tunisian tennis coach and a former player. Currently, he coaches Turkish tennis player Zeynep Sönmez. Jellali represented Tunisia in the Davis Cup three times in 1998, 2002 and 2003, with a record of four wins (all doubles) for six defeats.

He played around 50 professional tournaments from 1997 to 2009, notably participating in the qualifications for Dubai Tennis Championships in 2001 and the Tunis Challenger in 2002. In doubles, he won a Futures tournament in Bressuire with Malek Jaziri in 2004. Owner and director of a tennis academy in Dubai, he was the coach of Malek Jaziri and Damir Džumhur. In February 2020, he became full-time coach of his compatriot Ons Jabeur. In November 2025, it was announced that he and Jabeur would be joining the team of Sönmez in the 2026 season as her head coach and mentor, respectively.

== Futures and Challenger finals ==
=== Doubles: 1–0 ===
| Result | W–L | Date | Tournament | Tier | Surface | Partner | Opponents | Score |
|---|---|---|---|---|---|---|---|---|
| Win | 3–0 | Feb 2004 | France F3, Bressuire | Futures | Hard (i) | (Tunisia) Malek Jaziri | (United States) Eric Butorac (Serbia and Montenegro) Petar Popović | 6–1, 7–6^{(7–5)} |
