= Andrei Luzgin =

Estonian tennis player

- Country (sports): Estonia
- Born: 2 February 1973 (age 52)

Singles
- Career record: 13–8 (Davis Cup)
- Highest ranking: No. 1212 (26 August 1996)

Doubles
- Career record: 16–7 (Davis Cup)
- Highest ranking: No. 844 (25 November 1996)

Andrei Luzgin (born 2 February 1973) is a tennis coach and former Estonian tennis player. He achieved his career high ATP singles ranking in 1996 at No. 1212. The same year he also achieved his career high doubles ranking at No. 844.

Andrei Luzgin held an all-time record of most total wins for Estonia Davis Cup team until it was broken by Mait Künnap.
