= Efe Üstündağ =

Turkish tennis player (born 1977)

- Country (sports): Turkey
- Born: 15 January 1977 (age 48) Istanbul, Turkey
- Prize money: $12,203

Singles
- Career record: 4–8 (Davis Cup)
- Highest ranking: No. 599 (31 Jul 2000)

Doubles
- Career record: 0–2 (Davis Cup)
- Highest ranking: No. 373 (24 Jul 2000)

Efe Üstündağ (born 15 January 1977) is a Turkish former professional tennis player. He was a member of the Turkey Davis Cup team from 1998 to 2001 and won two ITF Futures doubles titles.

Üstündağ, a native of Istanbul, has been the Rice University men's head coach since 2012. He was both the 2016 and 2017 C-USA tennis Coach of the Year. A former Rice University player, Üstündağ twice earned All-American honors. In 1999 he and Shane Stone were NCAA doubles quarter-finalists.

== ITF Futures finals ==
=== Doubles: 6 (2–4) ===
Result	W–L	Date	Tournament	Surface	Partner	Opponents	Score
Win	1–0	Aug 1999	Belarus F1, Minsk	Carpet	(Israel) Raviv Weidenfeld	(United Kingdom) Barry Fulcher (United Kingdom) Paul Maggs	6–3, 6–7, 6–2
Win	2–0	Sep 1999	Russia F3, Tolyatti	Hard	(Israel) Raviv Weidenfeld	(Russia) Artem Derepasko (Russia) Kirill Ivanov-Smolensky	2–6, 6–3, 6–4
Loss	2–1	Oct 1999	Uzbekistan F3, Guliston	Hard	(Turkey) Erhan Oral	(Belarus) Alexander Shvets (Uzbekistan) Dmitri Tomashevich	3–6, 1–6
Loss	2–2	Feb 2000	USA F4, Corpus Christi	Hard	(Italy) Manuel Jorquera	(Canada) Bobby Kokavec (Argentina) Cristian Kordasz	2–6, 3–6
Loss	2–3	Jul 2000	Turkey F1, Istanbul	Hard	(Spain) Angel-Jose Martin-Arroyo	(Australia) Sebastien Swierk (Australia) Josh Tuckfield	6–7^{(5)}, 3–6
Loss	2–4	Jul 2000	Turkey F3, Istanbul	Hard	(France) Cedric Kauffmann	(Australia) Sebastien Swierk (Australia) Josh Tuckfield	3–6, 5–7
