= Rene Busch =

Estonian tennis player and coach

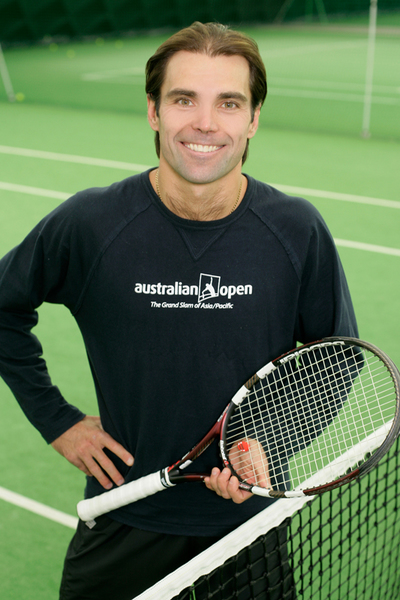
- Country (sports): Estonia
- Born: 19 July 1971 (age 55) Tallinn, then part of Estonian SSR, Soviet Union

Singles
- Career record: 1–3
- Highest ranking: No. 793 (11 September 1995)

Doubles
- Career record: 0–0
- Highest ranking: No. 1321 (22 June 1998)

Team competitions
- Davis Cup: 23–17

Rene Busch (born 19 July 1971) is a tennis coach and former Estonian tennis player. He achieved his career high ATP ranking in 1995 on No.793.

He was born in Tallinn.

He was the all-time singles wins leader for Estonia Davis Cup team. He currently runs his own private tennis school in Tallinn called "Rene Buschi Tennisekool".
