= Solon Peppas =

Greek tennis player

- Full name: Solon Peppas
- Country (sports): Greece
- Born: 25 October 1974 (age 50); Rhodes, Greece
- Plays: Right-handed
- Prize money: $98,878

Singles
- Career record: 7–5
- Highest ranking: No. 149 (21 August 2000)

Doubles
- Career record: 0–1
- Highest ranking: No. 786 (8 June 1998)

Solon Peppas (born 25 October 1974) is a former professional tennis player from Greece.

== Biography ==
Peppas, a right-handed player from Rhodes, featured in 23 Davis Cup ties for the Greece national team. In his Davis Cup career he won 18 singles matches, with a 20/14 overall record. He debuted on the ATP Tour at the 1994 Athens International, as a local wildcard entrant. His next main draw appearance was at the U.S. Pro Tennis Championships in 1999, where he had a win over Alberto Martin to make the round of 16. Following a runner-up finish at the 2000 Kiev Challenger he reached his highest career ranking of 149 in the world. He appeared as a qualifier in the main draw of the 2001 Gelsor Open Romania.
