= Bojan Vujić =

Bosnian diplomat and tennis player

Bosnia and Herzegovina Ambassador to the United States
- In office 16 September 2019 – 30 June 2023
- Preceded by: Haris Hrle
- Succeeded by: Sven Alkalaj

Personal details
- Born: 6 June 1974 (age 50); Ljubljana, SR Slovenia, SFR Yugoslavia
- Tennis career
- Country (sports): Yugoslavia; Bosnia and Herzegovina
- Prize money: $12,240

Singles
- Career record: 15–6 (Davis Cup)
- Highest ranking: No. 275 (9 September 1996)

Grand Slam singles results
- Australian Open: Q1 (1994, 1995)
- US Open: Q1 (1996)

Doubles
- Career record: 8–2 (Davis Cup)
- Highest ranking: No. 1092 (18 September 2006)

Bojan Vujić (born 6 June 1974) is a Bosnian diplomat and former professional tennis player who served as Bosnia and Herzegovina ambassador to the United States from 2019 to 2023.

As a tennis player, he competed in the Davis Cup for both the Federal Republic of Yugoslavia (1995–1997) and Bosnia and Herzegovina (2004–2006). Vujić reached a career high singles ranking of 275 on the professional tour.

== See also ==
- List of Yugoslavia Davis Cup team representatives
