= Sule Ladipo =

Nigerian tennis player

- Country (sports): Nigeria
- Residence: Indianapolis, Indiana, U.S.
- Born: 9 April, 1974 Enugu, Nigeria
- Turned pro: 1993
- Plays: Right-handed

Singles
- Highest ranking: No. 245
- Olympic Games: Out first round (1996)

Suleiman "Sule" Ladipo (born 9 April 1974 in Enugu) is a male former tennis player from Nigeria, who turned professional in 1993. The right-hander represented his native country at the 1996 Summer Olympics in Atlanta, Georgia, where he was defeated in the first round by Australia's Jason Stoltenberg. He reached his highest singles ATP-ranking on 3 April 1996, when he was ranked 245th in the world.
