= Mait Künnap =

Estonian tennis player

- Country (sports): Estonia
- Born: 23 September 1982 (age 43) Pärnu, then part of Estonian SSR, Soviet Union
- Height: 1.90 m (6 ft 3 in)
- Prize money: $33,601

Singles
- Career record: 1–8 (at ATP Tour level, Grand Slam level, and in Davis Cup)
- Highest ranking: No. 705 (4 August 2008)

Doubles
- Career record: 6–6 (at ATP Tour level, Grand Slam level, and in Davis Cup)
- Highest ranking: No. 377 (4 July 2005)

Team competitions
- Davis Cup: 30–28

Mait Künnap (born 23 September 1982) is an Estonian tennis player. His all-time world ranking high came on 4 August 2008 when he reached number 705, although his doubles ranking is somewhat better, having reached world number 377 on 4 July 2005.

Works at Pärnu Tennisehall as tennis trainer.

He held an all-time record of most total wins for Estonia Davis Cup team until it was broken by Jürgen Zopp.
