= Monaco Davis Cup team =

National tennis team

Monaco
- Captain: Guillaume Couillard
- Nations Ranking: 35 ▲9 (February 2026)
- Colors: Red & White
- First year: 1929
- Years played: 85
- Ties played (W–L): 172 (85–87)
- Best finish: Qualifiers first round (2027)
- Most total wins: Benjamin Balleret (48–31)
- Most singles wins: Benjamin Balleret (33–24)
- Most doubles wins: Romain Arneodo (18–6)
- Most ties played: Benjamin Balleret (47)
- Most years played: Benjamin Balleret (19)

The Monaco men's national tennis team represents Monaco in the Davis Cup tennis competition and are governed by the Fédération Monegasque de Lawn Tennis.

== History ==
Monaco competed in its first Davis Cup in 1929.

Monaco won their World Group I encounter against Finland in 2026 and will compete in the first round of the Qualifiers in 2027. This is Monaco's best result in Davis Cup history.

== Current team (2026) ==
- Valentin Vacherot
- Lucas Catarina
- Hugo Nys
- Romain Arneodo

== See also ==
- Davis Cup
