= 1993 Davis Cup Europe/Africa Zone Group III =

International tennis competition

The Europe/Africa Zone was one of the three zones of the regional Davis Cup competition in 1993.

In the Europe/Africa Zone there were three different tiers, called groups, in which teams competed against each other to advance to the upper tier. Winners in Group III advanced to the Europe/Africa Zone Group II in 1994. All other teams remained in Group III.

== Participating nations ==
- Benin
- Congo
- Djibouti
- Estonia (Note: Russia took over the place in the World Group gained by the CIS in the 1992 Davis Cup, and assumed all historical records held by the Soviet Union. Former Soviet states and newly independent countries Estonia, Latvia and Ukraine would all begin as new nations in Group III.)
- Latvia
- Malta
- San Marino
- Slovenia (Note: As the stronger tennis nation that began Davis Cup play immediately after the breakup of Yugoslavia, and due to the ongoing sanctions against the Federal Republic of Yugoslavia, Croatia took Yugoslavia's spot in Group I and Slovenia began as a new nation in Group III. Yugoslavia continued to hold their historical records when they resumed play in 1995, which were subsequently passed onto Serbia.)
- Togo
- Turkey
- Ukraine
- Zambia

=== Draw ===
Group A

- Venue: Lusaka Tennis Club, Lusaka, Zambia
- Date: 28 April–2 March

	LAT	SLO	ZAM	TUR	SMR	CGO	RR; W–L	Match; W–L	Set; W–L	Standings
Latvia		2–1	3–0	3–0	3–0	3–0	5–0	14–1 (93%)	29–4 (88%)	1
Slovenia	1–2		3–0	3–0	2–1	3–0	4–1	12–3 (80%)	26–9 (74%)	2
Zambia	0–3	0–3		2–1	3–0	3–0	3–2	8–7 (53%)	18–15 (55%)	3
Turkey	0–3	0–3	1–2		3–0	3–0	2–3	7–8 (47%)	15–18 (45%)	4
San Marino	0–3	1–2	0–3	0–3		3–0	1–4	4–11 (27%)	11–24 (31%)	5
Congo	0–3	0–3	0–3	0–3	0–3		0–5	0–15 (0%)	1–30 (3%)	6

- Latvia and Slovenia promoted to Group II in 1994.

Group B

- Venue: Marsa Sports Club, Marsa, Malta
- Date: 5–9 March

	UKR	EST	MLT	TOG	BEN	DJI	RR; W–L	Match; W–L	Set; W–L	Standings
Ukraine		3–0	3–0	3–0	3–0	3–0	5–0	15–0 (100%)	30–3 (91%)	1
Estonia	0–3		2–1	3–0	3–0	3–0	4–1	11–4 (73%)	23–11 (68%)	2
Malta	0–3	1–2		2–1	3–0	3–0	3–2	9–6 (60%)	21–15 (58%)	3
Togo	0–3	0–3	1–2		3–0	3–0	2–3	7–8 (47%)	18–18 (50%)	4
Benin	0–3	0–3	0–3	0–3		3–0	1–4	3–12 (20%)	9–24 (27%)	5
Djibouti	0–3	0–3	0–3	0–3	0–3		0–5	0–15 (0%)	0–30 (0%)	6

- Ukraine and Estonia promoted to Group II in 1994.

== Group A ==
=== Congo vs. Zambia ===
Congo
0
Lusaka Tennis Club, Lusaka, Zambia
28 April 1993

Zambia
3

			1	2	3
1	(Republic of the Congo) (Zambia)	Alain Bemba; Niza Simunyola	2; 6	1; 6
2	(Republic of the Congo) (Zambia)	Christian Bemba; Dermot Sweeney	1; 6	2; 6
3	(Republic of the Congo) (Zambia)	Alain Bemba / Christian Bemba; Stephen Kangwa / Teza Simunyola	4; 6	4; 6

=== Latvia vs. Turkey ===
Latvia
3
Lusaka Tennis Club, Lusaka, Zambia
28 April 1993

Turkey
0

			1	2	3
1	(Latvia) (Turkey)	Armand Strombach; Berk Albayrak	6; 4	6; 1
2	(Latvia) (Turkey)	Ģirts Dzelde; Alaaddin Karagöz	6; 1	6; 4
3	(Latvia) (Turkey)	Ģirts Dzelde / Armand Strombach; Yavuz Erkangil / Alaaddin Karagöz	6; 2	6; 0

=== San Marino vs. Slovenia ===
San Marino
1
Lusaka Tennis Club, Lusaka, Zambia
28 April 1993

Slovenia
2

			1	2	3
1	(San Marino) (Slovenia)	Massimiliano Rosti; Marko Por	4; 6	4; 6
2	(San Marino) (Slovenia)	Domenico Vicini; Blaž Trupej	4; 6	6; 2	6; 4
3	(San Marino) (Slovenia)	Gabriel Francini / Domenico Vicini; Marko Por / Blaž Trupej	6; 3	2; 6	2; 6

=== Congo vs. Slovenia ===
Congo
0
Lusaka Tennis Club, Lusaka, Zambia
29 April 1993

Slovenia
3

			1	2	3
1	(Republic of the Congo) (Slovenia)	Alain Bemba; Marko Por	2; 6	3; 6
2	(Republic of the Congo) (Slovenia)	Christian Bemba; Blaž Trupej	1; 6	0; 6
3	(Republic of the Congo) (Slovenia)	Alain Bemba / Christian Bemba; Marko Por / Blaž Trupej	6^{6} 7^{8}	0; 6

=== Latvia vs. San Marino ===
Latvia
3
Lusaka Tennis Club, Lusaka, Zambia
29 April 1993

San Marino
0

			1	2	3
1	(Latvia) (San Marino)	Armand Strombach; Christian Forcellini	6; 0	6; 2
2	(Latvia) (San Marino)	Ģirts Dzelde; Domenico Vicini	4; 6	6; 3	6; 4
3	(Latvia) (San Marino)	Māris Rozentāls / Armand Strombach; Christian Forcellini / Gabriel Francini	6; 1	6; 3

=== Turkey vs. Zambia ===
Turkey
1
Lusaka Tennis Club, Lusaka, Zambia
29 April 1993

Zambia
2

			1	2	3
1	(Turkey) (Zambia)	Yavuz Erkangil; Niza Simunyola	5; 7	3; 6
2	(Turkey) (Zambia)	Alaaddin Karagöz; Dermot Sweeney	4; 6	6; 3	7; 9
3	(Turkey) (Zambia)	Berk Albayrak / Barış Ergün; Stephen Kangwa / Teza Simunyola	3; 6	6; 4	9; 7

=== Congo vs. San Marino ===
Congo
0
Lusaka Tennis Club, Lusaka, Zambia
30 April 1993

San Marino
3

			1	2	3
1	(Republic of the Congo) (San Marino)	Alain Bemba; Massimiliano Rosti	5; 7	2; 6
2	(Republic of the Congo) (San Marino)	Christian Bemba; Domenico Vicini	4; 6	1; 6
3	(Republic of the Congo) (San Marino)	Alain Bemba / Christian Bemba; Christian Forcellini / Gabriel Francini	3; 6	6; 4	8; 10

=== Latvia vs. Zambia ===
Latvia
3
Lusaka Tennis Club, Lusaka, Zambia
30 April 1993

Zambia
0

			1	2	3
1	(Latvia) (Zambia)	Armand Strombach; Niza Simunyola	6; 2	6; 1
2	(Latvia) (Zambia)	Ģirts Dzelde; Dermot Sweeney	6; 2	6; 2
3	(Latvia) (Zambia)	Ģirts Dzelde / Māris Rozentāls; Stephen Kangwa / Teza Simunyola	6; 4	6; 2

=== Slovenia vs. Turkey ===
Slovenia
3
Lusaka Tennis Club, Lusaka, Zambia
30 April 1993

Turkey
0

			1	2	3
1	(Slovenia) (Turkey)	Marko Por; Barış Ergün	6; 0	6; 4
2	(Slovenia) (Turkey)	Blaž Trupej; Berk Albayrak	6; 3	7^{7} 6^{5}
3	(Slovenia) (Turkey)	Marko Por / Blaž Trupej; Barış Ergün / Yavuz Erkangil	6; 1	6; 3

=== Congo vs. Turkey ===
Congo
0
Lusaka Tennis Club, Lusaka, Zambia
1 May 1993

Turkey
3

			1	2	3
1	(Republic of the Congo) (Turkey)	Alain Bemba; Barış Ergün	2; 6	2; 6
2	(Republic of the Congo) (Turkey)	Christian Bemba; Berk Albayrak	2; 6	0; 6
3	(Republic of the Congo) (Turkey)	Alain Bemba / Christian Bemba; Berk Albayrak / Alaaddin Karagöz	3; 6	3; 6

=== Latvia vs. Slovenia ===
Latvia
2
Lusaka Tennis Club, Lusaka, Zambia
1 May 1993

Slovenia
1

			1	2	3
1	(Latvia) (Slovenia)	Armand Strombach; Marko Por	6; 3	5; 7	1; 6
2	(Latvia) (Slovenia)	Ģirts Dzelde; Blaž Trupej	6; 4	6; 1
3	(Latvia) (Slovenia)	Ģirts Dzelde / Armand Strombach; Marko Por / Blaž Trupej	5; 7	6; 3	7; 5

=== San Marino vs. Zambia ===
San Marino
0
Lusaka Tennis Club, Lusaka, Zambia
1 May 1993

Zambia
3

			1	2	3
1	(San Marino) (Zambia)	Gabriel Francini; Niza Simunyola	3; 6	4; 6
2	(San Marino) (Zambia)	Domenico Vicini; Dermot Sweeney	5; 7	2; 6
3	(San Marino) (Zambia)	Christian Forcellini / Massimiliano Rosti; Teza Simunyola / Dermot Sweeney	6^{2} 7^{7}	2; 6

=== Congo vs. Latvia ===
Congo
0
Lusaka Tennis Club, Lusaka, Zambia
2 May 1993

Latvia
3

			1	2	3
1	(Republic of the Congo) (Latvia)	Alain Bemba; Māris Rozentāls	2; 6	1; 6
2	(Republic of the Congo) (Latvia)	Christian Bemba; Armand Strombach	3; 6	1; 6
3	(Republic of the Congo) (Latvia)	Alain Bemba / Christian Bemba; Māris Rozentāls / Armand Strombach	2; 6	2; 6

=== San Marino vs. Turkey ===
San Marino
0
Lusaka Tennis Club, Lusaka, Zambia
2 May 1993

Turkey
3

			1	2	3
1	(San Marino) (Turkey)	Massimiliano Rosti; Berk Albayrak	2; 6	2; 6
2	(San Marino) (Turkey)	Domenico Vicini; Alaaddin Karagöz	4; 6	6; 3	1; 6
3	(San Marino) (Turkey)	Christian Forcellini / Gabriel Francini; Barış Ergün / Yavuz Erkangil	4; 6	4; 6

=== Slovenia vs. Zambia ===
Slovenia
3
Lusaka Tennis Club, Lusaka, Zambia
2 May 1993

Zambia
0

			1	2	3
1	(Slovenia) (Zambia)	Marko Por; Niza Simunyola	6; 1	6; 4
2	(Slovenia) (Zambia)	Blaž Trupej; Dermot Sweeney	6; 3	7; 5
3	(Slovenia) (Zambia)	Marko Por / Borut Urh; Stephen Kangwa / Teza Simunyola	4; 6	7^{8} 6^{6}	6; 3

== Group B ==
=== Benin vs. Malta ===
Benin
0
Marsa Sports Club, Marsa, Malta
5 May 1993

Malta
3

			1	2	3
1	(Benin) (Malta)	Alphonse Gandonou; Gordon Asciak	6^{3} 7^{7}	7; 5	2; 6
2	(Benin) (Malta)	Achille Takpa; Christopher Gatt	6^{3} 7^{7}	2; 6
3	(Benin) (Malta)	Victorien Abikou / Alphonse Gandonou; Gordon Asciak / Christopher Gatt	2; 6	6^{2} 7^{7}

=== Djibouti vs. Ukraine ===
Djibouti
0
Marsa Sports Club, Marsa, Malta
5 May 1993

Ukraine
3

			1	2	3
1	(Djibouti) (Ukraine)	Mohammed-Abdou Hassan; Dimitri Poliakov	0; 6	0; 6
2	(Djibouti) (Ukraine)	Chamsan Nasser-Saeed; Andriy Medvedev	0; 6	0; 6
3	(Djibouti) (Ukraine)	Abdou-Mohammed Ahmed / Mohammed-Abdou Hassan; Oleksandr Dolgopolov / Andriy Medvedev	0; 6	0; 6

=== Estonia vs. Togo ===
Estonia
3
Marsa Sports Club, Marsa, Malta
5 May 1993

Togo
0

			1	2	3
1	(Estonia) (Togo)	Rene Busch; Katore Agnamba	6; 1	6; 4
2	(Estonia) (Togo)	Andres Võsand; Goudjo Gbedey	5; 7	6; 3	6; 4
3	(Estonia) (Togo)	Rene Busch / Andres Võsand; Koko Kunkel / Jean-Kome Loglo	6; 4	6; 2

=== Benin vs. Ukraine ===
Benin
0
Marsa Sports Club, Marsa, Malta
6 May 1993

Ukraine
3

			1	2	3
1	(Benin) (Ukraine)	Robert Adidji; Dimitri Muzyka	1; 6	2; 6
2	(Benin) (Ukraine)	Victorien Abikou; Dimitri Poliakov	1; 6	1; 6
3	(Benin) (Ukraine)	Alphonse Gandonou / Achille Takpa; Andriy Medvedev / Dimitri Poliakov	0; 6	1; 6

=== Djibouti vs. Togo ===
Djibouti
0
Marsa Sports Club, Marsa, Malta
6 May 1993

Togo
3

			1	2	3
1	(Djibouti) (Togo)	Mohammed-Abdou Hassan; Jean-Kome Loglo	2; 6	0; 6
2	(Djibouti) (Togo)	Chamsan Nasser-Saeed; Koko Kunkel	1; 6	0; 6
3	(Djibouti) (Togo)	Mohammed-Abdou Hassan / Chamsan Nasser-Saeed; Katore Agnamba / Jean-Kome Loglo	3; 6	2; 6

=== Estonia vs. Malta ===
Estonia
2
Marsa Sports Club, Marsa, Malta
6 May 1993

Malta
1

			1	2	3
1	(Estonia) (Malta)	Rene Busch; Gordon Asciak	2; 6	6; 3	5; 7
2	(Estonia) (Malta)	Andres Võsand; Christopher Gatt	2; 6	6; 2	6; 2
3	(Estonia) (Malta)	Rene Busch / Andres Võsand; Gordon Asciak / Christopher Gatt	6; 4	7^{7} 6^{3}

=== Benin vs. Estonia ===
Benin
0
Marsa Sports Club, Marsa, Malta
7 May 1993

Estonia
3

			1	2	3
1	(Benin) (Estonia)	Alphonse Gandonou; Rene Busch	2; 6	6; 4	1; 6
2	(Benin) (Estonia)	Achille Takpa; Andres Võsand	0; 6	1; 6
3	(Benin) (Estonia)	Alphonse Gandonou / Achille Takpa; Rene Busch / Aivo Ojassalu	2; 6	1; 6

=== Djibouti vs. Malta ===
Djibouti
0
Marsa Sports Club, Marsa, Malta
7 May 1993

Malta
3

			1	2	3
1	(Djibouti) (Malta)	Mohammed-Abdou Hassan; Gordon Asciak	0; 6	1; 6
2	(Djibouti) (Malta)	Chamsan Nasser-Saeed; Christopher Gatt	0; 6	1; 6
3	(Djibouti) (Malta)	Mohammed-Abdou Hassan / Chamsan Nasser-Saeed; Daryl Delicata / Steven Schranz	0; 6	1; 6

=== Togo vs. Ukraine ===
Togo
0
Marsa Sports Club, Marsa, Malta
7 May 1993

Ukraine
3

			1	2	3
1	(Togo) (Ukraine)	Koko Kunkel; Dimitri Muzyka	6; 4	4; 6	3; 6
2	(Togo) (Ukraine)	Goudjo Gbedey; Dimitri Poliakov	6; 4	4; 6	1; 6
3	(Togo) (Ukraine)	Katore Agnamba / Jean-Kome Loglo; Andriy Medvedev / Dimitri Poliakov	1; 6	2; 6

=== Benin vs. Djibouti ===
Benin
3
Marsa Sports Club, Marsa, Malta
8 May 1993

Djibouti
0

			1	2	3
1	(Benin) (Djibouti)	Alphonse Gandonou; Abdou-Mohammed Ahmed	6; 0	6; 0
2	(Benin) (Djibouti)	Achille Takpa; Mohammed-Abdou Hassan	6; 0	6; 3
3	(Benin) (Djibouti)	Victorien Abikou / Robert Adidji; Abdou-Mohammed Ahmed / Mohammed-Abdou Hassan	6; 0	6; 2

=== Estonia vs. Ukraine ===
Estonia
0
Marsa Sports Club, Marsa, Malta
8 May 1993

Ukraine
3

			1	2	3
1	(Estonia) (Ukraine)	Rene Busch; Dimitri Poliakov	0; 6	4; 6
2	(Estonia) (Ukraine)	Andres Võsand; Andriy Medvedev	4; 6	1; 6
3	(Estonia) (Ukraine)	Rene Busch / Andres Võsand; Andriy Medvedev / Dimitri Poliakov	4; 6	4; 6

=== Malta vs. Togo ===
Malta
2
Marsa Sports Club, Marsa, Malta
8 May 1993

Togo
1

			1	2	3
1	(Malta) (Togo)	Gordon Asciak; Jean-Kome Loglo	2; 6	6; 4	6; 2
2	(Malta) (Togo)	Christopher Gatt; Koko Kunkel	3; 6	6; 0	1; 6
3	(Malta) (Togo)	Gordon Asciak / Christopher Gatt; Koko Kunkel / Jean-Kome Loglo	6; 2	6; 3

=== Benin vs. Togo ===
Benin
0
Marsa Sports Club, Marsa, Malta
9 May 1993

Togo
3

			1	2	3
1	(Benin) (Togo)	Alphonse Gandonou; Jean-Kome Loglo	1; 6	6; 3	1; 6
2	(Benin) (Togo)	Achille Takpa; Koko Kunkel	1; 6	4; 6
3	(Benin) (Togo)	Victorien Abikou / Robert Adidji; Katore Agnamba / Jean-Kome Loglo	6^{2} 7^{7}	0; 6

=== Djibouti vs. Estonia ===
Djibouti
0
Marsa Sports Club, Marsa, Malta
9 May 1993

Estonia
3

			1	2	3
1	(Djibouti) (Estonia)	Mohammed-Abdou Hassan; Aivo Ojassalu	0; 6	1; 6
2	(Djibouti) (Estonia)	Chamsan Nasser-Saeed; Rene Busch	2; 6	0; 6
3	(Djibouti) (Estonia)	Omar-Awad Mohammed / Chamsan Nasser-Saeed; Rene Busch / Aivo Ojassalu	2; 6	0; 6

=== Malta vs. Ukraine ===
Malta
0
Marsa Sports Club, Marsa, Malta
9 May 1993

Ukraine
3

			1	2	3
1	(Malta) (Ukraine)	Gordon Asciak; Dimitri Poliakov	1; 6	4; 6
2	(Malta) (Ukraine)	Christopher Gatt; Andriy Medvedev	6; 3	2; 6	4; 6
3	(Malta) (Ukraine)	Daryl Delicata / Steven Schranz; Andriy Medvedev / Dimitri Muzyka	2; 6	2; 6
