= 1994 Davis Cup Europe/Africa Zone Group II =

International tennis competition

The Europe/Africa Zone was one of the three zones of the regional Davis Cup competition in 1994.

In the Europe/Africa Zone there were three different tiers, called groups, in which teams competed against each other to advance to the upper tier. Winners in Group II advanced to the Europe/Africa Zone Group I. Teams who lost their respective ties competed in the relegation play-offs, with winning teams remaining in Group II, whereas teams who lost their play-offs were relegated to the Europe/Africa Zone Group III in 1995.

== Participating nations ==
- Bulgaria
- Egypt
- Estonia
- Finland
- Ghana
- Greece
- Ireland
- Kenya
- Latvia
- Monaco
- Morocco
- Nigeria
- Poland
- Senegal
- Slovenia
- Ukraine

=== Draw ===
Relegation Play-offs
Dublin, Ireland (carpet)
Kenya	1
Ireland	4
Cairo, Egypt (clay)
Egypt	3
Bulgaria	2
Monte Carlo, Monaco (clay)
Monaco	4
Senegal	1
Athens, Greece (clay)
Greece	1
Estonia	4

First Round
Nairobi, Kenya (clay)
Kenya	1
Latvia	3
Dublin, Ireland (indoor carpet)
Ukraine	5
Ireland	0
Casablanca, Morocco (clay)
Morocco	5
Egypt	0
Sopot, Poland (indoor carpet)
Poland	4
Bulgaria	1
Accra, Ghana (hard)
Ghana	3
Monaco	2
Lagos, Nigeria (hard)
Nigeria	5
Senegal	0
Maribor, Slovenia (clay)
Slovenia	3
Greece	2
Helsinki, Finland (indoor carpet)
Estonia	1
Finland	4

Second Round
Jūrmala, Latvia (clay)
Latvia	3
Ukraine	2
Warsaw, Poland (clay)
Morocco	5
Poland	0
Accra, Ghana (hard)
Ghana	3
Nigeria	2
Ljubljana, Slovenia (clay)
Slovenia	3
Finland	2

Third Round
Jūrmala, Latvia (hard)
Latvia	1
Morocco	4
Accra, Ghana (hard)
Ghana	2
Slovenia	3

- Kenya, Bulgaria, Senegal, and Greece relegated to Group III in 1995.
- Morocco and Slovenia promoted to Group I in 1995.

== First round ==
=== Kenya vs. Latvia ===
Kenya
1
Nairobi Club Ground, Nairobi, Kenya
29 April–1 May 1994
Clay

Latvia
3

			1	2	3	4	5
1	(Kenya) (Latvia)	Eno Polo; Ģirts Dzelde	6^{3} 7^{7}	4; 6	2; 6
2	(Kenya) (Latvia)	Paul Wekesa; Andris Fiļimonovs	6^{5} 7^{7}	6; 1	6; 4	6; 1
3	(Kenya) (Latvia)	Eno Polo / Paul Wekesa; Andris Fiļimonovs / Ģirts Dzelde	3; 6	7^{7} 6^{4}	6^{1} 7^{7}	3; 6
4	(Kenya) (Latvia)	Paul Wekesa; Ģirts Dzelde	4; 6	6^{4} 7^{7}	6^{5} 7^{7}
5	(Kenya) (Latvia)	Eno Polo; Andris Fiļimonovs						not played

=== Ireland vs. Ukraine ===
Ireland
0
Fitzwilliam Lawn Tennis Club, Dublin, Ireland
29 April–1 May 1994
Carpet (indoors)

Ukraine
5

			1	2	3	4	5
1	(Republic of Ireland) (Ukraine)	Mark Farren; Dimitri Poliakov	7^{8} 6^{6}	5; 7	2; 6	4; 6
2	(Republic of Ireland) (Ukraine)	Eoin Collins; Andrei Rybalko	6; 4	7^{7} 6^{3}	2; 6	3; 6	6; 8
3	(Republic of Ireland) (Ukraine)	Eoin Collins / Mark Farren; Viktor Egorov / Dimitri Poliakov	7^{8} 6^{6}	7^{7} 6^{3}	3; 6	4; 6	15; 17
4	(Republic of Ireland) (Ukraine)	Stewart Doyle; Taras Beiko	6; 2	4; 6	2; 6
5	(Republic of Ireland) (Ukraine)	Scott Barron; Andrei Rybalko	7^{7} 6^{1}	4; 6	2; 6

=== Morocco vs. Egypt ===
Morocco
5
Complexe Al Amal, Casablanca, Morocco
29 April–1 May 1994
Clay

Egypt
0

			1	2	3	4	5
1	(Morocco) (Egypt)	Karim Alami; Karim Zaher	6; 3	6; 1	6; 2
2	(Morocco) (Egypt)	Younes El Aynaoui; Khaled El-Salawy	6; 0	6; 1	6; 0
3	(Morocco) (Egypt)	Karim Alami / Younes El Aynaoui; Khaled El-Salawy / Karim Zaher	6; 1	7; 5	6; 4
4	(Morocco) (Egypt)	Younes El Aynaoui; Karim Zaher	6; 0	6; 3
5	(Morocco) (Egypt)	Karim Alami; Khaled El-Salawy	6; 2	6; 0

=== Poland vs. Bulgaria ===
Poland
4
Sopocki Klub Tenisowy, Sopot, Poland
29 April–1 May 1994
Carpet (indoors)

Bulgaria
1

			1	2	3	4	5
1	(Poland) (Bulgaria)	Bartłomiej Dąbrowski; Milko Petkov	6; 1	6; 3	6; 2
2	(Poland) (Bulgaria)	Maciej Kost; Mark Markov	6; 1	6; 3	6; 3
3	(Poland) (Bulgaria)	Tomasz Iwański / Maciej Kost; Krassimir Lazarov / Radoslav Radev	6; 3	6; 4	6^{8} 7^{10}	3; 6	3; 6
4	(Poland) (Bulgaria)	Bartłomiej Dąbrowski; Mark Markov	6; 1	6; 1	6; 2
5	(Poland) (Bulgaria)	Maciej Kost; Milko Petkov	6; 3	6; 4

=== Ghana vs. Monaco ===
Ghana
3
Accra Sports Stadium, Accra, Ghana
29 April–1 May 1994
Hard

Monaco
2

			1	2	3	4	5
1	(Ghana) (Monaco)	Franklyn Ofori; Christophe Boggetti	6; 3	6; 3	6; 1
2	(Ghana) (Monaco)	Mike Amoah; Sébastien Graeff	6^{8} 7^{10}	4; 6	7; 5	3; 6
3	(Ghana) (Monaco)	Franklyn Ofori / Emmanuel Paddi; Christophe Boggetti / Sébastien Graeff	6; 3	7^{7} 6^{2}	6^{3} 7^{7}	7^{8} 6^{6}
4	(Ghana) (Monaco)	Franklyn Ofori; Sébastien Graeff	6; 4	6; 4	6; 0
5	(Ghana) (Monaco)	Mike Amoah; Christophe Boggetti	4; 6	1; 6

=== Nigeria vs. Senegal ===
Nigeria
5
National Stadium, Lagos, Nigeria
29 April–1 May 1994
Hard

Senegal
0

			1	2	3	4	5
1	(Nigeria) (Senegal)	Emmanuel Udozorh; Abou Berthé	6; 1	6; 3	4; 6	6; 2
2	(Nigeria) (Senegal)	Sule Ladipo; El Hadj Diedhiou	6; 0	6; 1	6; 1
3	(Nigeria) (Senegal)	Sule Ladipo / Emmanuel Udozorh; Abou Berthé / Malick Ndoye	6; 1	6; 1	6; 2
4	(Nigeria) (Senegal)	Sule Ladipo; Abou Berthé	6; 1	6; 2
5	(Nigeria) (Senegal)	Emmanuel Udozorh; El Hadj Diedhiou	6; 1	7^{8} 6^{6}

=== Slovenia vs. Greece ===
Slovenia
3
Teniški klub Branik, Maribor, Slovenia
29 April–1 May 1994
Clay

Greece
2

			1	2	3	4	5
1	(Slovenia) (Greece)	Iztok Božič; Konstantinos Efraimoglou	6; 1	6; 2	6; 4
2	(Slovenia) (Greece)	Blaž Trupej; Anastasios Bavelas	4; 6	4; 6	7^{7} 6^{5}	1; 6
3	(Slovenia) (Greece)	Marko Por / Blaž Trupej; Anastasios Bavelas / Konstantinos Efraimoglou	5; 7	6; 1	6; 4	3; 6	4; 6
4	(Slovenia) (Greece)	Iztok Božič; Anastasios Bavelas	7^{8} 6^{6}	6; 3	6; 0
5	(Slovenia) (Greece)	Blaž Trupej; Solon Peppas	6; 2	7; 5	6; 1

=== Finland vs. Estonia ===
Finland
4
Talin Tenniskeskus, Helsinki, Finland
29 April–1 May 1994
Carpet (indoors)

Estonia
1

			1	2	3	4	5
1	(Finland) (Estonia)	Ville Liukko; Andres Võsand	3; 6	7^{7} 6^{3}	6; 2	6; 2
2	(Finland) (Estonia)	Tuomas Ketola; Rene Busch	6; 4	6; 1	7^{7} 6^{3}
3	(Finland) (Estonia)	Tuomas Ketola / Tommi Lenho; Alti Vahkal / Andres Võsand	4; 6	6; 3	3; 6	6; 4	4; 6
4	(Finland) (Estonia)	Tuomas Ketola; Andres Võsand	6; 3	6; 4	3; 6	6; 2
5	(Finland) (Estonia)	Ville Liukko; Rene Busch	6; 2	7^{7} 6^{3}

== Second round ==
=== Latvia vs. Ukraine ===
Latvia
3
National Tennis Centre Lielupe, Jūrmala, Latvia
15–17 July 1994
Clay

Ukraine
2

			1	2	3	4	5
1	(Latvia) (Ukraine)	Ģirts Dzelde; Dimitri Poliakov	3; 6	7; 5	2; 6	1; 6
2	(Latvia) (Ukraine)	Armand Strombach; Sergei Baranov	6; 0	6; 4	6; 3
3	(Latvia) (Ukraine)	Ģirts Dzelde / Andris Fiļimonovs; Viktor Egorov / Dimitri Poliakov	6^{3} 7^{7}	6; 4	6; 2	6; 1
4	(Latvia) (Ukraine)	Armand Strombach; Dimitri Poliakov	1; 6	6; 4	5; 7	1; 6
5	(Latvia) (Ukraine)	Ģirts Dzelde; Sergei Baranov	6; 2	7; 5	6; 4

=== Poland vs. Morocco ===
Poland
0
Legia Warsaw, Warsaw, Poland
15–17 July 1994
Clay

Morocco
5

			1	2	3	4	5
1	(Poland) (Morocco)	Maciej Kost; Younes El Aynaoui	6; 2	4; 6	4; 6	2; 6
2	(Poland) (Morocco)	Bartłomiej Dąbrowski; Karim Alami	5; 7	3; 6	2; 6
3	(Poland) (Morocco)	Bartłomiej Dąbrowski / Paweł Ostrowski; Karim Alami / Hicham Arazi	6; 4	4; 6	6^{3} 7^{7}	2; 6
4	(Poland) (Morocco)	Bartłomiej Dąbrowski; Hicham Arazi	3; 6	6^{0} 7^{7}
5	(Poland) (Morocco)	Maciej Kost; Karim Alami	1; 6	2; 6

=== Ghana vs. Nigeria ===
Ghana
3
Accra Sports Stadium, Accra, Ghana
15–17 July 1994
Hard

Nigeria
2

			1	2	3	4	5
1	(Ghana) (Nigeria)	Franklyn Ofori; Emmanuel Udozorh	6^{5} 7^{7}	6; 3	6; 4	6; 4
2	(Ghana) (Nigeria)	Isaac Donkor; Sule Ladipo	6^{4} 7^{7}	2; 6	4; 6
3	(Ghana) (Nigeria)	Kenneth Dowuona / Franklyn Ofori; Sule Ladipo / Emmanuel Udozorh	3; 6	4; 6	4; 6
4	(Ghana) (Nigeria)	Franklyn Ofori; Sule Ladipo	6; 4	7^{7} 6^{5}	3; 6	6; 2
5	(Ghana) (Nigeria)	Isaac Donkor; Emmanuel Udozorh	3; 6	7^{7} 6^{4}	6; 3	7^{7} 6^{1}

=== Slovenia vs. Finland ===
Slovenia
3
Športno društvo Ten-Ten, Ljubljana, Slovenia
15–17 July 1994
Clay

Finland
2

			1	2	3	4	5
1	(Slovenia) (Finland)	Blaž Trupej; Tuomas Ketola	4; 6	4; 6	6; 3	2; 6
2	(Slovenia) (Finland)	Iztok Božič; Tapio Nurminen	7; 5	6; 4	6; 4
3	(Slovenia) (Finland)	Iztok Božič / Borut Urh; Ville Liukko / Olli Rahnasto	2; 6	4; 6	3; 6
4	(Slovenia) (Finland)	Iztok Božič; Tuomas Ketola	6; 4	6; 2	7^{7} 6^{4}
5	(Slovenia) (Finland)	Blaž Trupej; Tapio Nurminen	6; 3	6; 3	7^{8} 6^{6}

== Relegation play-offs ==
=== Ireland vs. Kenya ===
Ireland
4
Fitzwilliam Lawn Tennis Club, Dublin, Ireland
15–17 July 1994
Carpet

Kenya
1

			1	2	3	4	5
1	(Republic of Ireland) (Kenya)	Peter Wright; Paul Wekesa	7^{8} 6^{6}	5; 7	3; 6	4; 6
2	(Republic of Ireland) (Kenya)	Eoin Collins; Allan Cooper	6; 0	6; 0	6; 1
3	(Republic of Ireland) (Kenya)	Eoin Collins / Mark Farren; Eno Polo / Paul Wekesa	7^{7} 6^{1}	6; 3	6; 3
4	(Republic of Ireland) (Kenya)	Eoin Collins; Paul Wekesa	7; 5	6; 3	7^{7} 6^{1}
5	(Republic of Ireland) (Kenya)	Peter Wright; Allan Cooper	6^{6} 7^{8}	6; 3	6; 1

=== Egypt vs. Bulgaria ===
Egypt
3
Gezira Sporting Club, Cairo, Egypt
15–18 July 1994
Clay

Bulgaria
2

			1	2	3	4	5
1	(Egypt) (Bulgaria)	Amr Ghoneim; Ivan Keskinov	6; 1	6; 1	6; 3
2	(Egypt) (Bulgaria)	Hisham Hemeda; Mark Markov	5; 7	7^{8} 6^{6}	1; 6	6^{2} 7^{7}
3	(Egypt) (Bulgaria)	Mohammed Eleish / Amr Ghoneim; Mark Markov / Radoslav Radev	6; 4	4; 6	3; 6	4; 6
4	(Egypt) (Bulgaria)	Amr Ghoneim; Mark Markov	7^{7} 6^{0}	6; 3	6; 2
5	(Egypt) (Bulgaria)	Hisham Hemeda; Ivan Keskinov	4; 6	7^{7} 6^{5}	6; 3	2; 6	6; 2

=== Monaco vs. Senegal ===
Monaco
4
Tennis Club de Monaco, Monte Carlo, Monaco
15–17 July 1994
Clay

Senegal
1

			1	2	3	4	5
1	(Monaco) (Senegal)	Sébastien Graeff; Jean-Noël Said	7; 5	3; 6	6; 4	6; 3
2	(Monaco) (Senegal)	Christophe Boggetti; Fadel Berthé	3; 6	6^{2} 7^{7}	6; 4	6; 3	6; 4
3	(Monaco) (Senegal)	Christophe Boggetti / Sébastien Graeff; Abou Berthé / Fadel Berthé	6; 4	6; 1	6; 4
4	(Monaco) (Senegal)	Sébastien Graeff; Fadel Berthé	3; 6	3; 6
5	(Monaco) (Senegal)	Christophe Boggetti; Jean-Noël Said	6; 2	6; 4

=== Greece vs. Estonia ===
Greece
1
Athens Lawn Tennis Club, Athens, Greece
15–17 July 1994
Clay

Estonia
4

			1	2	3	4	5
1	(Greece) (Estonia)	Solon Peppas; Rene Busch	4; 6	6; 4	6; 1	6; 2
2	(Greece) (Estonia)	Konstantinos Efraimoglou; Andres Võsand	1; 6	5; 7	2; 6
3	(Greece) (Estonia)	Konstantinos Efraimoglou / Solon Peppas; Alti Vahkal / Andres Võsand	4; 6	6^{5} 7^{7}	4; 6
4	(Greece) (Estonia)	Solon Peppas; Andres Võsand	4; 6	6; 0	3; 6	6; 4	3; 6
5	(Greece) (Estonia)	Konstantinos Efraimoglou; Rene Busch	5; 6	6^{5} 7^{7}

== Third round ==
=== Latvia vs. Morocco ===
Latvia
1
National Tennis Centre Lielupe, Jūrmala, Latvia
23–25 September 1994
Hard

Morocco
4

			1	2	3	4	5
1	(Latvia) (Morocco)	Armand Strombach; Hicham Arazi	1; 6	1; 6	6^{1} 7^{7}
2	(Latvia) (Morocco)	Ģirts Dzelde; Younes El Aynaoui	5; 7	7^{7} 6^{5}	5; 7	2; 6
3	(Latvia) (Morocco)	Ģirts Dzelde / Andris Fiļimonovs; Hicham Arazi / Younes El Aynaoui	6; 3	1; 6	1; 6	4; 6
4	(Latvia) (Morocco)	Armand Strombach; Mehdi Tahiri	4; 6	6; 4	6; 2
5	(Latvia) (Morocco)	Ģirts Dzelde; Hicham Arazi	2; 6	4; 6

=== Ghana vs. Slovenia ===
Ghana
2
Accra Sports Stadium, Accra, Ghana
23–26 September 1994
Hard

Slovenia
3

			1	2	3	4	5
1	(Ghana) (Slovenia)	Isaac Donkor; Iztok Božič	4; 6	4; 6	2; 6
2	(Ghana) (Slovenia)	Franklyn Ofori; Blaž Trupej	0; 6	6; 4	6; 2	7; 5
3	(Ghana) (Slovenia)	Isaac Donkor / Franklyn Ofori; Jaka Božić / Blaž Trupej	6^{5} 7^{7}	3; 6	4; 6
4	(Ghana) (Slovenia)	Franklyn Ofori; Iztok Božič	6; 3	7^{7} 6^{5}	2; 6	7; 5
5	(Ghana) (Slovenia)	Isaac Donkor; Blaž Trupej	7; 5	2; 6	6^{6} 7^{8}	7^{7} 6^{3}	6; 8
