= 1995 Davis Cup Europe/Africa Zone Group II =

International tennis competition

The Europe/Africa Zone was one of the three zones of the regional Davis Cup competition in 1995.

In the Europe/Africa Zone there were three different tiers, called groups, in which teams competed against each other to advance to the upper tier. Winners in Group II advanced to the Europe/Africa Zone Group I. Teams who lost their respective ties competed in the relegation play-offs, with winning teams remaining in Group II, whereas teams who lost their play-offs were relegated to the Europe/Africa Zone Group III in 1996.

== Participating nations ==
- Belarus
- Egypt
- Estonia
- Finland
- Ghana
- Great Britain
- Ireland
- Ivory Coast
- Latvia
- Lithuania
- Luxembourg
- Monaco
- Nigeria
- Poland
- Slovakia
- Ukraine

=== Draw ===
Relegation Play-offs
Vilnius, Lithuania (clay)
Lithuania	1
Poland	4
Abidjan, Ivory Coast (hard)
Ireland	2
Ivory Coast	3
Minsk, Belarus (carpet)
Belarus	5
Estonia	0
Eastbourne, United Kingdom (grass)
Monaco	0
Great Britain	5

First Round
Šiauliai, Lithuania (indoor carpet)
Luxembourg	4
Lithuania	1
Lagos, Nigeria (hard)
Nigeria	3
Poland	2
Accra, Ghana (hard)
Ghana	3
Ireland	2
Abidjan, Ivory Coast (hard)
Ivory Coast	2
Finland	3
Minsk, Belarus (indoor carpet)
Ukraine	3
Belarus	2
Tallinn, Estonia (indoor carpet)
Estonia	2
Latvia	3
Cairo, Egypt (clay)
Egypt	4
Monaco	1
Bratislava, Slovakia (clay)
Slovakia	5
Great Britain	0

Second Round
Esch-sur-Alzette, Lux. (indoor carpet)
Luxembourg	4
Nigeria	1
Tampere, Finland (clay)
Ghana	0
Finland	5
Jūrmala, Latvia (clay)
Ukraine	3
Latvia	2
Cairo, Egypt (clay)
Egypt	3
Slovakia	2

Third Round
Helsinki, Finland (indoor carpet)
Luxembourg	1
Finland	4
Cairo, Egypt (clay)
Ukraine	4
Egypt	1

- Lithuania, Ireland, Estonia, and Monaco relegated to Group III in 1996.
- Finland and Ukraine promoted to Group I in 1996.

== First round ==
=== Lithuania vs. Luxembourg ===
Lithuania
1
Šiauliai Tennis Club, Šiauliai, Lithuania
28–30 April 1995
Carpet (indoors)

Luxembourg
4

			1	2	3	4	5
1	(Lithuania) (Luxembourg)	Rolandas Muraška; Johny Goudenbour	6; 4	6; 4	6^{5} 7^{7}	4; 6	6; 2
2	(Lithuania) (Luxembourg)	Gitanas Mažonas; Adrian Graimprey	4; 6	2; 6	1; 6
3	(Lithuania) (Luxembourg)	Gitanas Mažonas / Rolandas Muraška; Johny Goudenbour / Alberto Paris	4; 6	2; 6	0; 6
4	(Lithuania) (Luxembourg)	Rolandas Muraška; Adrian Graimprey	6^{2} 7^{7}	5; 7	2; 6
5	(Lithuania) (Luxembourg)	Gitanas Mažonas; Johny Goudenbour	3; 6	2; 6

=== Nigeria vs. Poland ===
Nigeria
3
National Stadium, Lagos, Nigeria
28–30 April 1995
Hard

Poland
2

			1	2	3	4	5
1	(Nigeria) (Poland)	Sule Ladipo; Tomasz Lichoń	6; 2	6; 2	6; 3
2	(Nigeria) (Poland)	Emmanuel Udozorh; Bartłomiej Dąbrowski	0; 6	4; 6	4; 6
3	(Nigeria) (Poland)	Sule Ladipo / Emmanuel Udozorh; Bartłomiej Dąbrowski / Marcin Rozpedski	3; 6	7; 5	7; 5	6; 2
4	(Nigeria) (Poland)	Sule Ladipo; Bartłomiej Dąbrowski	6; 1	6; 3	6; 1
5	(Nigeria) (Poland)	Ganiyu Adenekan; Tomasz Lichoń	1; 6	3; 6

=== Ghana vs. Ireland ===
Ghana
3
Accra Sports Stadium, Accra, Ghana
28–30 April 1995
Hard

Ireland
2

			1	2	3	4	5
1	(Ghana) (Republic of Ireland)	Kojo Atiso; Scott Barron	6^{3} 7^{7}	6^{5} 7^{7}	1; 6
2	(Ghana) (Republic of Ireland)	Franklyn Ofori; Eoin Collins	6; 2	6; 4	7^{7} 6^{4}
3	(Ghana) (Republic of Ireland)	Kojo Atiso / Franklyn Ofori; Eoin Collins / Mark Farren	7; 5	3; 6	6^{5} 7^{7}	6; 3	3; 6
4	(Ghana) (Republic of Ireland)	Franklyn Ofori; Scott Barron	6; 4	7; 5	6; 2
5	(Ghana) (Republic of Ireland)	Isaac Donkor; Eoin Collins	6; 3	6; 4				retired

=== Ivory Coast vs. Finland ===
Ivory Coast
2
Tennis Centre, Abidjan, Ivory Coast
28–30 April 1995
Hard

Finland
3

			1	2	3	4	5
1	(Ivory Coast) (Finland)	Nouhoun Sangaré; Kim Tiilikainen	6; 4	3; 6	6^{6} 7^{8}	6; 0	3; 0	retired
2	(Ivory Coast) (Finland)	Claude N'Goran; Tuomas Ketola	6^{2} 7^{7}	2; 6	6; 3	6; 2	9; 11
3	(Ivory Coast) (Finland)	Ilou Lonfo / Claude N'Goran; Tuomas Ketola / Olli Rahnasto	5; 7	6; 3	7^{7} 6^{1}	4; 6	3; 6
4	(Ivory Coast) (Finland)	Claude N'Goran; Kim Tiilikainen	6; 2	6^{5} 7^{7}	6; 3	6; 2
5	(Ivory Coast) (Finland)	Nouhoun Sangaré; Tuomas Ketola	3; 6	3; 6	6^{5} 7^{7}

=== Belarus vs. Ukraine ===
Belarus
2
Tennis Palace, Minsk, Belarus
28–30 April 1995
Carpet (indoors)

Ukraine
3

			1	2	3	4	5
1	(Belarus) (Ukraine)	Vladimir Voltchkov; Dimitri Poliakov	6^{3} 7^{7}	4; 6	6; 3	7; 5	0; 6
2	(Belarus) (Ukraine)	Evgeni Mikheev; Andrei Rybalko	7; 5	6; 2	4; 6	6^{2} 7^{7}	6; 8
3	(Belarus) (Ukraine)	Max Mirnyi / Vladimir Voltchkov; Dimitri Poliakov / Andrei Rybalko	6; 1	4; 6	6; 4	6; 4
4	(Belarus) (Ukraine)	Evgeni Mikheev; Dimitri Poliakov	2; 6	4; 6	3; 6
5	(Belarus) (Ukraine)	Vladimir Voltchkov; Andrei Rybalko	6; 4	6; 1

=== Estonia vs. Latvia ===
Estonia
2
Kalev Sports Hall, Tallinn, Estonia
28–30 April 1995
Carpet (indoors)

Latvia
3

			1	2	3	4	5
1	(Estonia) (Latvia)	Alti Vahkal; Ģirts Dzelde	1; 6	2; 6	4; 6
2	(Estonia) (Latvia)	Sten Sumberg; Armand Strombach	6; 3	6^{2} 7^{7}	4; 6	4; 6
3	(Estonia) (Latvia)	Sten Sumberg / Alti Vahkal; Ģirts Dzelde / Armand Strombach	7^{8} 6^{6}	6^{9} 7^{11}	7^{7} 6^{2}	6; 1
4	(Estonia) (Latvia)	Alti Vahkal; Armand Strombach	2; 6	6; 3	3; 6	6; 3	6; 2
5	(Estonia) (Latvia)	Sten Sumberg; Ģirts Dzelde	2; 6	4; 6	7^{7} 6^{5}	3; 6

=== Egypt vs. Monaco ===
Egypt
4
Gezira Sporting Club, Cairo, Egypt
28–30 April 1995
Clay

Monaco
1

			1	2	3	4	5
1	(Egypt) (Monaco)	Khaled El-Salawy; Christophe Boggetti	6; 1	6; 2	6; 0
2	(Egypt) (Monaco)	Amr Ghoneim; Christophe Bosio	6; 4	6; 2	6; 4
3	(Egypt) (Monaco)	Khaled El-Salawy / Karim Zaher; Christophe Boggetti / Christophe Bosio	6; 4	6^{3} 7^{7}	4; 6	2; 6
4	(Egypt) (Monaco)	Amr Ghoneim; Christophe Boggetti	6; 3	6; 0	6; 1
5	(Egypt) (Monaco)	Khaled El-Salawy; Christophe Bosio	6; 3	6; 1

=== Slovakia vs. Great Britain ===
Slovakia
5
Slovan Stadium, Bratislava, Slovakia
28–30 April 1995
Clay

Great Britain
0

			1	2	3	4	5
1	(Slovakia) (United Kingdom)	Ján Krošlák; Tim Henman	7; 5	6; 3	4; 6	6; 3
2	(Slovakia) (United Kingdom)	Karol Kučera; Miles Maclagan	6; 3	6; 2	4; 6	7; 5
3	(Slovakia) (United Kingdom)	Ján Krošlák / Karol Kučera; Neil Broad / Tim Henman	3; 6	6; 4	6; 4	2; 6	6; 2
4	(Slovakia) (United Kingdom)	Karol Kučera; Tim Henman	6; 4	6; 2
5	(Slovakia) (United Kingdom)	Ján Krošlák; Miles Maclagan	7; 5	6; 2

== Second round ==
=== Luxembourg vs. Nigeria ===
Luxembourg
4
Centre National de Tennis, Esch-sur-Alzette, Luxembourg
14–16 July 1995
Carpet (indoors)

Nigeria
1

			1	2	3	4	5
1	(Luxembourg) (Nigeria)	Johny Goudenbour; Emmanuel Udozorh	6; 1	6; 0	6; 4
2	(Luxembourg) (Nigeria)	Serge Brueck; Sule Ladipo	6; 2	6; 3	4; 6	4; 6	2; 6
3	(Luxembourg) (Nigeria)	Johny Goudenbour / Alberto Paris; Sule Ladipo / Emmanuel Udozorh	6; 2	6; 1	7^{7} 6^{4}
4	(Luxembourg) (Nigeria)	Johny Goudenbour; Sule Ladipo	6; 2	6; 3	6^{1} 7^{7}	6; 4
5	(Luxembourg) (Nigeria)	Adrian Graimprey; Emmanuel Udozorh	6; 2	6; 1

=== Finland vs. Ghana ===
Finland
5
Rosendahl Tennis Centre, Tampere, Finland
14–16 July 1995
Clay

Ghana
0

			1	2	3	4	5
1	(Finland) (Ghana)	Kim Tiilikainen; Kojo Atiso	6; 3	6; 1	6; 2
2	(Finland) (Ghana)	Tuomas Ketola; Franklyn Ofori	6; 3	7; 5	7; 5
3	(Finland) (Ghana)	Tuomas Ketola / Olli Rahnasto; Franklyn Ofori / Emmanuel Paddi	6; 0	6; 1	6; 4
4	(Finland) (Ghana)	Kim Tiilikainen; Isaac Donkor	6; 3	6; 4
5	(Finland) (Ghana)	Tommi Lenho; Kojo Atiso	6; 0	6; 1

=== Latvia vs. Ukraine ===
Latvia
2
National Tennis Center Lielupe, Jūrmala, Latvia
14–16 July 1995
Clay

Ukraine
3

			1	2	3	4	5
1	(Latvia) (Ukraine)	Ģirts Dzelde; Andrei Rybalko	3; 6	2; 6	2; 6
2	(Latvia) (Ukraine)	Armand Strombach; Dimitri Muzyka	6; 2	6; 3	6; 3
3	(Latvia) (Ukraine)	Ģirts Dzelde / Andris Fiļimonovs; Dimitri Muzyka / Andrei Rybalko	6; 4	7; 5	2; 6	6; 3
4	(Latvia) (Ukraine)	Ģirts Dzelde; Dimitri Muzyka	2; 6	4; 6	6; 1	2; 6
5	(Latvia) (Ukraine)	Armand Strombach; Andrei Rybalko	6^{2} 7^{7}	5; 7	3; 6

=== Egypt vs. Slovakia ===
Egypt
3
Gezira Sporting Club, Cairo, Egypt
14–16 July 1995
Clay

Slovakia
2

			1	2	3	4	5
1	(Egypt) (Slovakia)	Amr Ghoneim; Karol Kučera	6; 4	6; 2	1; 6	2; 6	3; 6
2	(Egypt) (Slovakia)	Tamer El-Sawy; Ján Krošlák	4; 6	6; 3	7; 5	2; 1		retired
3	(Egypt) (Slovakia)	Tamer El-Sawy / Hisham Hemeda; Branislav Gálik / Karol Kučera	7^{8} 6^{6}	1; 6	6; 4	1; 6	6; 4
4	(Egypt) (Slovakia)	Tamer El-Sawy; Karol Kučera	5; 7	6; 2	7; 5	6; 4
5	(Egypt) (Slovakia)	Amr Ghoneim; Branislav Gálik	6^{6} 7^{8}	7^{7} 6^{4}	2; 6

== Relegation play-offs ==
=== Lithuania vs. Poland ===
Lithuania
1
Žalgiris Stadium, Vilnius, Lithuania
14–16 July 1995
Clay

Poland
4

			1	2	3	4	5
1	(Lithuania) (Poland)	Denis Ivancovas; Bartłomiej Dąbrowski	1; 6	0; 6	0; 6
2	(Lithuania) (Poland)	Rolandas Muraška; Tomasz Lichoń	2; 6	7; 5	6; 2	6; 4
3	(Lithuania) (Poland)	Denis Ivancovas / Rolandas Muraška; Bartłomiej Dąbrowski / Tomasz Lichoń	2; 6	2; 6	2; 6
4	(Lithuania) (Poland)	Rolandas Muraška; Bartłomiej Dąbrowski	5; 7	3; 6	4; 6
5	(Lithuania) (Poland)	Denis Ivancovas; Tomasz Lichoń	1; 6	2; 6

=== Ivory Coast vs. Ireland ===
Ivory Coast
3
Hôtel Ivoire, Abidjan, Ivory Coast
14–16 July 1995
Hard

Ireland
2

			1	2	3	4	5
1	(Ivory Coast) (Republic of Ireland)	Jean-Christophe Nabi; Owen Casey	6; 3	4; 6	6; 2	4; 6	4; 6
2	(Ivory Coast) (Republic of Ireland)	Claude N'Goran; Scott Barron	6; 1	6; 3	5; 7	6; 3
3	(Ivory Coast) (Republic of Ireland)	Ilou Lonfo / Claude N'Goran; Eoin Collins / Mark Farren	6; 4	1; 6	6; 2	6; 3
4	(Ivory Coast) (Republic of Ireland)	Claude N'Goran; Eoin Collins	6^{4} 7^{7}	7; 5	6; 4	1; 0		retired
5	(Ivory Coast) (Republic of Ireland)	Jean-Christophe Nabi; Scott Barron	3; 6	6; 3	1; 6

=== Belarus vs. Estonia ===
Belarus
5
Tennis Palace, Minsk, Belarus
14–16 July 1995
Carpet

Estonia
0

			1	2	3	4	5
1	(Belarus) (Estonia)	Vladimir Voltchkov; Rene Busch	6; 4	5; 7	6; 0	6; 1
2	(Belarus) (Estonia)	Alexander Shvets; Sten Sumberg	6; 3	6; 3	6; 3
3	(Belarus) (Estonia)	Max Mirnyi / Vladimir Voltchkov; Sten Sumberg / Alti Vahkal	6; 3	7^{8} 6^{6}	4; 6	6; 3
4	(Belarus) (Estonia)	Max Mirnyi; Rene Busch	6; 0	6^{4} 7^{7}	6; 3
5	(Belarus) (Estonia)	Vladimir Voltchkov; Alti Vahkal	6; 2	6; 0

=== Great Britain vs. Monaco ===
Great Britain
5
Devonshire Park Lawn Tennis Club, Eastbourne, United Kingdom
14–16 July 1995
Grass

Monaco
0

			1	2	3	4	5
1	(United Kingdom) (Monaco)	Greg Rusedski; Christophe Boggetti	6; 2	6; 2	7^{7} 6^{5}
2	(United Kingdom) (Monaco)	Tim Henman; Sébastien Graeff	6; 0	6; 3	6; 2
3	(United Kingdom) (Monaco)	Neil Broad / Mark Petchey; Christophe Boggetti / Sébastien Graeff	6; 4	6; 0	7^{7} 6^{1}
4	(United Kingdom) (Monaco)	Greg Rusedski; Sébastien Graeff	6; 0	6; 1
5	(United Kingdom) (Monaco)	Tim Henman; Christophe Boggetti	6; 1	6; 4

== Third round ==
=== Finland vs. Luxembourg ===
Finland
4
Talin Tenniskeskus, Helsinki, Finland
22–24 September 1995
Carpet (indoors)

Luxembourg
1

			1	2	3	4	5
1	(Finland) (Luxembourg)	Kim Tiilikainen; Adrian Graimprey	6; 3	6; 3	6; 2
2	(Finland) (Luxembourg)	Tuomas Ketola; Johny Goudenbour	4; 6	2; 6	6; 3	6; 2	6; 3
3	(Finland) (Luxembourg)	Tuomas Ketola / Olli Rahnasto; Johny Goudenbour / Alberto Paris	4; 6	3; 6	6; 4	6; 4	1; 6
4	(Finland) (Luxembourg)	Kim Tiilikainen; Jacques Radoux	6; 4	6; 2	6; 3
5	(Finland) (Luxembourg)	Tuomas Ketola; Adrian Graimprey	6; 2	6; 1

=== Egypt vs. Ukraine ===
Egypt
1
Gezira Sporting Club, Cairo, Egypt
22–24 September 1995
Clay

Ukraine
4

			1	2	3	4	5
1	(Egypt) (Ukraine)	Tamer El-Sawy; Dimitri Poliakov	6; 3	6; 1	6; 3
2	(Egypt) (Ukraine)	Amr Ghoneim; Andriy Medvedev	4; 6	3; 6	3; 6
3	(Egypt) (Ukraine)	Tamer El-Sawy / Hisham Hemeda; Andriy Medvedev / Dimitri Poliakov	6; 4	3; 6	6; 3	1; 6	4; 6
4	(Egypt) (Ukraine)	Tamer El-Sawy; Andriy Medvedev	3; 6	6; 1	1; 6	6; 2	3; 6
5	(Egypt) (Ukraine)	Amr Ghoneim; Dimitri Poliakov	6^{9} 7^{11}	2; 6
