= Forcellini =

Forcellini is an Italian surname. Notable people with the surname include:

- Christian Forcellini (born 1969), tennis player and sprinter from San Marino
- Egidio Forcellini (1688–1768), Italian philologist
- Silvana Forcellini (born 1943), Italian shot putter
