= Tennis at the 1992 Summer Olympics – Men's doubles =

Men's doubles at the Games of the XXV Olympiad
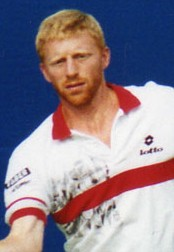
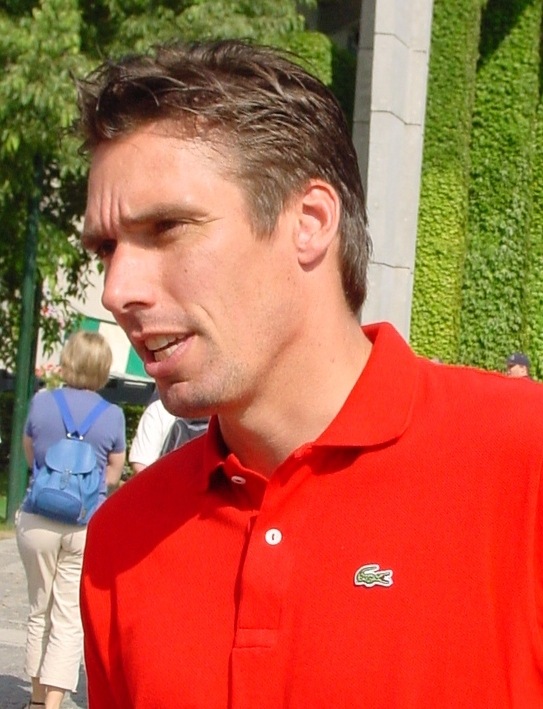
- Boris Becker (1994) Michael Stich (2003)
- Venue: Tennis de la Vall d'Hebron
- Dates: 30 July – 7 August 1992
- Competitors: 30 teams (60 players) from 30 nations

Medalists
1st place, gold medalist(s)		Boris Becker; Michael Stich; Germany
2nd place, silver medalist(s)		Wayne Ferreira; Piet Norval; South Africa
3rd place, bronze medalist(s)		Goran Ivanišević; Goran Prpić; Croatia
3rd place, bronze medalist(s)		Javier Frana; Christian Miniussi; Argentina

Men's doubles
- Tennis at the 1992 Summer Olympics

Events
Singles	men	women
Doubles	men	women
- Summer Olympics

Germany's Boris Becker and Michael Stich defeated South Africa's Wayne Ferreira and Piet Norval in the final, 7–6^{(7–5)}, 4–6, 7–6^{(7–5)}, 6–3 to win the gold medal in Men's Doubles tennis at the 1992 Summer Olympics. It was Germany's first medal in the event, though German player Friedrich Traun had been part of a mixed team that won in 1896. It was South Africa's first medal in the men's doubles since 1912 (and first medal in any Olympic event since 1960, due to the 1964–1988 ban resulting from apartheid). Croatia's Goran Ivanišević and Goran Prpić and Argentina's Javier Frana and Christian Miniussi won the bronze medals, which were both countries' first medals in the event.

The tournament was held at the Vall d'Hebron complex on Montjuïc, Barcelona, Spain from 30 July to 7 August 1992. There were 30 pairs from 30 nations, with each nation limited to one pair (two players), though the Moroccan and Hungarian pairs did not start.

== Background ==
This was the ninth appearance of men's doubles tennis. The event has been held at every Summer Olympics where tennis has been on the program: from 1896 to 1924 and then from 1988 to the current program. A demonstration event was held in 1968.

Germany's Boris Becker and Michael Stich were prominent singles players, but not well known as a doubles team.

The Bahamas, Croatia, Portugal, Puerto Rico, San Marino, and Slovenia each made their debut in the event. Great Britain made its seventh appearance in the event, most of any nation.

== Competition format ==
The competition was a single-elimination tournament. Unlike the pre-hiatus tournaments, there was no bronze-medal match. All matches were best-of-five sets. Tiebreaks were used for any set before the fifth that reached 6–6.

== Schedule ==
All times are Central European Summer Time (UTC+2)

Date	Time	Round
Thursday, 30 July 1992; Friday, 31 July 1992		Round of 32
Saturday, 1 August 1992; Sunday, 2 August 1992		Round of 16
Monday, 3 August 1992; Tuesday, 4 August 1992		Quarterfinals
Wednesday, 5 August 1992	11:00	Semifinals
Friday, 7 August 1992	11:00	Final

== Seeds ==
1. John Fitzgerald / Todd Woodbridge (AUS) (second round)
2. Jakob Hlasek / Marc Rosset (SUI) (quarterfinals)
3. Sergio Casal / Emilio Sánchez (ESP) (quarterfinals)
4. Wayne Ferreira / Piet Norval (RSA) (final, silver medalists)
5. Paul Haarhuis / Mark Koevermans (NED) (first round)
6. Boris Becker / Michael Stich (GER) (champions, gold medalists)
7. Javier Frana / Christian Miniussi (ARG) (semifinals, bronze medalists)
8. Omar Camporese / Diego Nargiso (ITA) (second round)

== Draw ==
Semifinals
4	Wayne Ferreira (RSA); Piet Norval (RSA)	7^{7}	3	6	2	6
Goran Ivanišević (CRO); Goran Prpić (CRO)	6^{5}	6	3	6	2
6	Boris Becker (GER); Michael Stich (GER)	7^{7}	6	6^{4}	2	6
7	Javier Frana (ARG); Christian Miniussi (ARG)	6^{3}	2	7^{7}	6	4

Final (gold-medal match)
4	Wayne Ferreira (RSA); Piet Norval (RSA)	6^{5}	6	6^{5}	3
6	Boris Becker (GER); Michael Stich (GER)	7^{7}	4	7^{7}	6

=== Top half ===
First round
1	J Fitzgerald (AUS); T Woodbridge (AUS)	6	6	6^{4}	4	6
M Knowles (BAH); R Smith (BAH)	2	3	7^{7}	6	3
R Krishnan (IND); L Paes (IND)	6	6	6
I Božič (SLO); B Trupej (SLO)	3	2	2
S Suharyadi (INA); B Wiryawan (INA)	6	6^{6}	4	6	6
E-J Chang (KOR); C-W Kim (KOR)	1	7^{8}	6	3	2
G Ivanišević (CRO); G Prpić (CRO)	2	6	6	6
5	P Haarhuis (NED); M Koevermans (NED)	6	4	2	2
4	W Ferreira (RSA); P Norval (RSA)	6	6	5	6
B-O Pedersen (NOR); C Ruud (NOR)	2	4	7	3
B Gyetko (CAN); S Leblanc (CAN)	6	7^{7}	7^{7}
K Carlsen (DEN); F Fetterlein (DEN)	3	6^{4}	6^{2}
L Markovits (HUN); S Noszály (HUN)
G Cosac (ROM); D M Pescariu (ROM)	w/o
M Nido (PUR); J O Ríos (PUR)	1	2	3
8	O Camporese (ITA); D Nargiso (ITA)	6	6	6

Second round
1	J Fitzgerald (AUS); T Woodbridge (AUS)	4	5	6	1
R Krishnan (IND); L Paes (IND)	6	7	4	6
S Suharyadi (INA); B Wiryawan (INA)	5	2	2
G Ivanišević (CRO); G Prpić (CRO)	7	6	6
4	W Ferreira (RSA); P Norval (RSA)	6	7^{7}	6
B Gyetko (CAN); S Leblanc (CAN)	3	6^{4}	4
G Cosac (ROM); D M Pescariu (ROM)	6	4	4	6	6
8	O Camporese (ITA); D Nargiso (ITA)	1	6	6	4	2

Quarterfinals
R Krishnan (IND); L Paes (IND)	6^{3}	7	4	3
G Ivanišević (CRO); G Prpić (CRO)	7^{7}	5	6	6
4	W Ferreira (RSA); P Norval (RSA)	6	6	6
G Cosac (ROM); D M Pescariu (ROM)	0	3	2

Semifinals
G Ivanišević (CRO); G Prpić (CRO)	6^{5}	6	3	6	2
4	W Ferreira (RSA); P Norval (RSA)	7^{7}	3	6	2	6

=== Bottom half ===
First round
6	B Becker (GER); M Stich (GER)	w/o
K Alami (MAR); Y El Aynaoui (MAR)
C Forcellini (SMR); G Francini (SMR)	1	1	2
A Bavelas (GRE); K Efraimoglou (GRE)	6	6	6
J Courier (USA); P Sampras (USA)	1	6	4	7^{8}	6
S Edberg (SWE); A Järryd (SWE)	6	3	6	6^{6}	4
L Mattar (BRA); J Oncins (BRA)	3	6	7^{7}	3	1
3	S Casal (ESP); E Sánchez (ESP)	6	3	6^{4}	6	6
7	J Frana (ARG); C Miniussi (ARG)	6	6	7^{7}
A Castle (GBR); C Wilkinson (GBR)	3	4	6^{1}
E Couto (POR); B Mota (POR)	1	3	1
G Forget (FRA); H Leconte (FRA)	6	6	6
O Casey (IRL); E Collins (IRL)	7^{7}	6
L Lavalle (MEX); F Maciel (MEX)	6^{5}	4	r
Q Meng (CHN); J Xia (CHN)	5	1	2
2	J Hlasek (SUI); M Rosset (SUI)	7	6	6

Second round
6	B Becker (GER); M Stich (GER)	6	6	6
A Bavelas (GRE); K Efraimoglou (GRE)	1	3	4
J Courier (USA); P Sampras (USA)	7	6	3	2	2
3	S Casal (ESP); E Sánchez (ESP)	5	4	6	6	6
7	J Frana (ARG); C Miniussi (ARG)	4	6^{3}	6	6	6
G Forget (FRA); H Leconte (FRA)	6	7^{7}	4	4	3
O Casey (IRL); E Collins (IRL)	6^{4}	3	4
2	J Hlasek (SUI); M Rosset (SUI)	7^{7}	6	6

Quarterfinals
6	B Becker (GER); M Stich (GER)	6	4	7^{11}	5	6
3	S Casal (ESP); E Sánchez (ESP)	3	6	6^{9}	7	3
7	J Frana (ARG); C Miniussi (ARG)	2	7^{7}	3	6	6
2	J Hlasek (SUI); M Rosset (SUI)	6	6^{3}	6	2	2

Semifinals
6	B Becker (GER); M Stich (GER)	7^{7}	6	6^{4}	2	6
7	J Frana (ARG); C Miniussi (ARG)	6^{3}	2	7^{7}	6	4
