= Estonia Davis Cup team =

Estonia men's national tennis team

Estonia
- Captain: Vladimir Ivanov (2023–)
- Nations Ranking: 55 ▲7 (Feb 2026)
- First year: 1934–35
- Years played: 34
- Ties played (W–L): 106 (64–42)
- Years in World Group: 4
- Most total wins: Jürgen Zopp (45–19)
- Most singles wins: Jürgen Zopp (27–13)
- Most doubles wins: Mait Künnap (21–13)
- Best doubles team: Mait Künnap & Jürgen Zopp (7–4)
- Most ties played: Mait Künnap, Jürgen Zopp (37)
- Most years played: Jürgen Zopp, Vladimir Ivanov (14)
- Last updated on: 14 July 2026.

The Estonia men's national tennis team represents Estonia in Davis Cup tennis competition and are governed by the Estonian Tennis Association.

== History ==
Estonia competed in its first Davis Cup in 1934–35. From 1945 to 1992, Estonian players represented the Soviet Union.

=== Timeline ===
- 1993 Europe/Africa Zone Group III
- 1994–1995 Europe/Africa Zone Group II
- 1996–1999 Europe/Africa Zone Group III
- 2000–2001 Europe/Africa Zone Group II
- 2002–2004 Europe/Africa Zone Group III
- 2005 Europe/Africa Zone Group II
- 2006 Europe/Africa Zone Group III
- 2007 Europe/Africa Zone Group II
- 2008–2009 Europe/Africa Zone Group III
- 2010–2013 Europe/Africa Zone Group II
- 2014–2016 Europe/Africa Zone Group III
- 2017–2018 Europe/Africa Zone Group II
- 2019 Europe Zone Group III
- 2020 World Group II Play-offs & World Group II
- 2022 World Group II Play-offs & World Group II
- 2023 World Group II Play-offs & Europe Zone Group III
- 2024 World Group II Play-offs & World Group II
- 2025 World Group II Play-offs & World Group II
- 2026 World Group II play-offs & World Group II

== Recent performances ==
=== 1990s ===
Year	Competition	Date	Location	Opponent	Score	Result
1993	Europe/Africa Zone Group III, Round Robin	5 May	Marsa Sports Club, Marsa, (MLT)	Togo	3–0	Win
1993	Europe/Africa Zone Group III, Round Robin	6 May	Marsa Sports Club, Marsa, (MLT)	Malta	2–1	Win
1993	Europe/Africa Zone Group III, Round Robin	7 May	Marsa Sports Club, Marsa, (MLT)	Benin	3–0	Win
1993	Europe/Africa Zone Group III, Round Robin	8 May	Marsa Sports Club, Marsa, (MLT)	Ukraine	0–3	Loss
1993	Europe/Africa Zone Group III, Round Robin	9 May	Marsa Sports Club, Marsa, (MLT)	Djibouti	3–0	Win
1994	Europe/Africa Zone Group II, 1st Round	29 April–1 May	Talin Tenniskeskus, Helsinki (FIN)	Finland	1–4	Loss
1994	Europe/Africa Zone Group II, Relegation Play-off	15–17 July	Athens Lawn Tennis Club, Athens (GRE)	Greece	4–1	Win
1995	Europe/Africa Zone Group II, 1st Round	28–30 April	Kalev Sports Hall, Tallinn (EST)	Latvia	2–3	Loss
1995	Europe/Africa Zone Group II, Relegation Play-off	14–16 July	Tennis Palace, Minsk (BLR)	Belarus	0–5	Loss
1996	Europe/Africa Zone Group III, Round Robin	8 January	Nairobi Club Ground, Nairobi (KEN)	Moldova	2–1	Win
1996	Europe/Africa Zone Group III, Round Robin	9 January	Nairobi Club Ground, Nairobi (KEN)	Cameroon	1–2	Loss
1996	Europe/Africa Zone Group III, Round Robin	10 January	Nairobi Club Ground, Nairobi (KEN)	Zambia	3–0	Win
1996	Europe/Africa Zone Group III, Round Robin	11 January	Nairobi Club Ground, Nairobi (KEN)	Djibouti	3–0	Win
1996	Europe/Africa Zone Group III, Round Robin	13 January	Nairobi Club Ground, Nairobi (KEN)	Cyprus	3–0	Win
1996	Europe/Africa Zone Group III, Round Robin	14 January	Nairobi Club Ground, Nairobi (KEN)	Ireland	0–3	Loss
1997	Europe/Africa Zone Group III, Round Robin	21 May	Lokomotiv Tennis Club, Plovdiv (BUL)	Kenya	2–1	Win
1997	Europe/Africa Zone Group III, Round Robin	22 May	Lokomotiv Tennis Club, Plovdiv (BUL)	Bulgaria	0–3	Loss
1997	Europe/Africa Zone Group III, Round Robin	23 May	Lokomotiv Tennis Club, Plovdiv (BUL)	Malta	2–1	Win
1997	Europe/Africa Zone Group III, Semifinal	24 May	Lokomotiv Tennis Club, Plovdiv (BUL)	Monaco	0–3	Loss
1997	Europe/Africa Zone Group III, 3rd–4th play-off	25 May	Lokomotiv Tennis Club, Plovdiv (BUL)	Moldova	2–1	Win
1998	Europe/Africa Zone Group III, Round Robin	21 January	Amicale Tennis Association, Lomé (TOG)	Cyprus	2–1	Win
1998	Europe/Africa Zone Group III, Round Robin	22 January	Amicale Tennis Association, Lomé (TOG)	Madagascar	2–1	Win
1998	Europe/Africa Zone Group III, Round Robin	23 January	Amicale Tennis Association, Lomé (TOG)	Ghana	2–1	Win
1998	Europe/Africa Zone Group III, Semifinal	24 January	Amicale Tennis Association, Lomé (TOG)	Greece	0–3	Loss
1998	Europe/Africa Zone Group III, 3rd–4th play-off	25 January	Amicale Tennis Association, Lomé (TOG)	Ghana	2–1	Win
1999	Europe/Africa Zone Group III, Round Robin	9 June	Sini-Valge Tennis Club, Tallinn (EST)	Zambia	3–0	Win
1999	Europe/Africa Zone Group III, Round Robin	10 June	Sini-Valge Tennis Club, Tallinn (EST)	Monaco	2–1	Win
1999	Europe/Africa Zone Group III, Round Robin	11 June	Sini-Valge Tennis Club, Tallinn (EST)	Moldova	1–2	Loss
1999	Europe/Africa Zone Group III, Semifinal	12 June	Sini-Valge Tennis Club, Tallinn (EST)	Armenia	2–1	Win
1999	Europe/Africa Zone Group III, Final	13 June	Sini-Valge Tennis Club, Tallinn (EST)	Lithuania	2–1	Win

=== 2000s ===
Year	Competition	Date	Location	Opponent	Score	Result
2000	Europe/Africa Zone Group II, 1st Round	28–30 April	Górnik Tennis Club, Bytom (POL)	Poland	1–4	Loss
2000	Europe/Africa Zone Group II, Relegation Play-off	21–23 July	Kalev Sports Hall, Tallinn (EST)	Egypt	5–0	Win
2001	Europe/Africa Zone Group II, 1st Round	27–29 April	Kalev Sports Hall, Tallinn (EST)	Norway	2–3	Loss
2001	Europe/Africa Zone Group II, Relegation Play-off	20–22 July	InterContinental Hotel, Abidjan (CIV)	Ivory Coast	2–3	Loss
2002	Europe/Africa Zone Group III	9 May	Arka TC, Gdynia (POL)	Mauritius	3–0	Win
2002	Europe/Africa Zone Group III	10 May	Arka TC, Gdynia (POL)	Madagascar	2–1	Win
2002	Europe/Africa Zone Group III	11 May	Arka TC, Gdynia (POL)	Tunisia	1–2	Loss
2002	Europe/Africa Zone Group III	12 May	Arka TC, Gdynia (POL)	Poland	0–3	Loss
2003	Europe/Africa Zone Group III, Round Robin	3 February	Algiers (ALG)	Hungary	0–3	Loss
2003	Euro/African Zone Group III, Round Robin	4 February	Algiers (ALG)	Namibia	3–0	Win
2003	Euro/African Zone Group III, Round Robin	5 February	Algiers (ALG)	Madagascar	3–0	Win
2003	Euro/African Zone Group III, Promotion Pool	6 February	Algiers (ALG)	Algeria	1–2	Loss
2003	Euro/African Zone Group III, Promotion Pool	7 February	Algiers (ALG)	Lithuania	2–1	Win
2004	Europe/Africa Zone Group III, Round Robin	5 February	Orange Tennis Centre, Kaunas (LTU)	Cyprus	1–2	Loss
2004	Europe/Africa Zone Group III, Round Robin	6 February	Orange Tennis Centre, Kaunas (LTU)	Lithuania	2–1	Win
2004	Europe/Africa Zone Group III, Round Robin	7 February	Orange Tennis Centre, Kaunas (LTU)	North Macedonia	2–1	Win
2004	Europe/Africa Zone Group III, Round Robin	8 February	Orange Tennis Centre, Kaunas (LTU)	Monaco	0–3	Loss
2005	Europe/Africa Zone Group II, 1st Round	4–6 March	Tallinn (EST)	Portugal	1–4	Loss
2005	Europe/Africa Zone Group II, Relegation Play-off	15–17 July	Gdynia (POL)	Poland	0–5	Loss
2006	Europe/Africa Zone Group III, Round Robin	19 July	Teniski Klub MLADOST, Banja Luka (BIH)	Armenia	2–1	Win
2006	Europe/Africa Zone Group III, Round Robin	20 July	Teniski Klub MLADOST, Banja Luka (BIH)	Lithuania	2–1	Win
2006	Europe/Africa Zone Group III, Round Robin	21 July	Teniski Klub MLADOST, Banja Luka (BIH)	Andorra	3–0	Win
2006	Europe/Africa Zone Group III, Round Robin	22 July	Teniski Klub MLADOST, Banja Luka (BIH)	Monaco	1–2	Loss
2006	Europe/Africa Zone Group III, Round Robin	23 July	Teniski Klub MLADOST, Banja Luka (BIH)	Turkey	1–2	Loss
2007	Europe/Africa Zone Group II, 1st Round	6–8 April	Tallinn (EST)	Slovenia	2–3	Loss
2007	Europe/Africa Zone Group II, Relegation Play-off	20–22 July	Hornbæk (DEN)	Denmark	0–3	Loss
2008	Europe/Africa Zone Group III, Round Robin	7 May	Master Class Tennis and Fitness Club, Yerevan (ARM)	Lithuania	2–1	Win
2008	Europe/Africa Zone Group III, Round Robin	8 May	Master Class Tennis and Fitness Club, Yerevan (ARM)	Bosnia and Herzegovina	0–3	Loss
2008	Europe/Africa Zone Group III, Round Robin	9 May	Master Class Tennis and Fitness Club, Yerevan (ARM)	Ghana	3–0	Win
2008	Europe/Africa Zone Group III, Round Robin	10 May	Master Class Tennis and Fitness Club, Yerevan (ARM)	Andorra	3–0	Win
2008	Europe/Africa Zone Group III, Round Robin	11 May	Master Class Tennis and Fitness Club, Yerevan (ARM)	Armenia	3–0	Win
2009	Europe/Africa Zone Group III, Round Robin	29 April	Tenis Eskrim Daghcilik Spor Kulübü, Istanbul (TUR)	Botswana	3–0	Win
2009	Europe/Africa Zone Group III, Round Robin	30 April	Tenis Eskrim Daghcilik Spor Kulübü, Istanbul (TUR)	Iceland	3–0	Win
2009	Europe/Africa Zone Group III, Round Robin	1 May	Tenis Eskrim Daghcilik Spor Kulübü, Istanbul (TUR)	Luxembourg	3–0	Win
2009	Europe/Africa Zone Group III, Round Robin	2 May	Tenis Eskrim Daghcilik Spor Kulübü, Istanbul (TUR)	Turkey	2–1	Win
2009	Europe/Africa Zone Group III, Round Robin	3 May	Tenis Eskrim Daghcilik Spor Kulübü, Istanbul (TUR)	Greece	3–0	Win

=== 2010s ===
Year	Competition	Date	Location	Opponent	Score	Result
2010	Europe/Africa Zone Group II, 1st Round	5–7 March	Coral Tennis Club, Tallinn (EST)	Hungary	4–1	Win
2010	Europe/Africa Zone Group II, 2nd Round	9–11 July	Tere Tennisekeskus, Tallinn (EST)	Bosnia and Herzegovina	2–3	Loss
2011	Europe/Africa Zone Group II, 1st Round	4–6 March	Rocca al Mare Tennisekeskus, Tallinn (EST)	Lithuania	3–2	Win
2011	Europe/Africa Zone Group II, 2nd Round	8–10 July	SKPC Mejdan, Tuzla (BIH)	Bosnia and Herzegovina	2–3	Loss
2012	Europe/Africa Zone Group II, 1st Round	10–12 February	Tere Tennisekeskus, Tallinn (EST)	Luxembourg	5–0	Win
2012	Europe/Africa Zone Group II, 2nd Round	6–8 April	OSiR Hala Widowiskowo-sportowa, Inowrocław (POL)	Poland	1–4	Loss
2013	Europe/Africa Zone Group II, 1st Round	1–3 February	David Lloyd Riverview, Dublin (IRL)	Ireland	2–3	Loss
2013	Europe/Africa Zone Group II, Relegation Play-off	5–7 April	TC Lokomotiv Plovdiv, Plovdiv (BUL)	Bulgaria	0–3	Loss
2014	Europe Zone Group III, Round Robin	7 May	Gellért Szabadidőközpont, Szeged (HUN)	Turkey	1–2	Loss
2014	Europe Zone Group III, Round Robin	9 May	Gellért Szabadidőközpont, Szeged (HUN)	San Marino	3–0	Win
2014	Europe Zone Group III, 5th to 8th play-off	10 May	Gellért Szabadidőközpont, Szeged (HUN)	Malta	2–1	Win
2015	Europe Zone Group III, Round Robin	15 July	Centro Tennis Cassa di Risparmio, San Marino (SMR)	Liechtenstein	3–0	Win
2015	Europe Zone Group III, Round Robin	17 July	Centro Tennis Cassa di Risparmio, San Marino (SMR)	Montenegro	3–0	Win
2015	Europe Zone Group III, Promotion Play-off	18 July	Centro Tennis Cassa di Risparmio, San Marino (SMR)	Georgia	0–2	Loss
2016	Europe Zone Group III, Round Robin	2 March	Tere Tennis Centre, Tallinn (EST)	Liechtenstein	3–0	Win
2016	Europe Zone Group III, Round Robin	3 March	Tere Tennis Centre, Tallinn (EST)	Kosovo	3–0	Win
2016	Europe Zone Group III, Round Robin	4 March	Tere Tennis Centre, Tallinn (EST)	Greece	3–0	Win
2016	Europe Zone Group III, Promotion Play-off	5 March	Tere Tennis Centre, Tallinn (EST)	Moldova	2–0	Win
2017	Europe/Africa Zone Group II, 1st Round	3–5 February	Irene Country Club, Centurion (RSA)	South Africa	1–4	Loss
2017	Europe/Africa Zone Group II, Relegation Play-off	7–9 April	Tere Tennisekeskus, Tallinn (EST)	Monaco	3–2	Win
2018	Europe/Africa Zone Group II, 1st Round	3–4 February	Šiauliai Tennis School, Šiauliai (LTU)	Lithuania	1–3	Loss
2018	Europe/Africa Zone Group II, Relegation Play-off	7–8 April	Tere Tennisekeskus, Tallinn (EST)	Tunisia	3–2	Win
2019	Europe Zone Group III, Round Robin	11 September	Tatoi Club, Athens (GRE)	North Macedonia	3–0	Win
2019	Europe Zone Group III, Round Robin	12 September	Tatoi Club, Athens (GRE)	Montenegro	3–0	Win
2019	Europe Zone Group III, Round Robin	13 September	Tatoi Club, Athens (GRE)	Latvia	2–1	Win
2019	Europe Zone Group III, Final	14 September	Tatoi Club, Athens (GRE)	Poland	0–2	Loss

=== 2020s ===
Year	Competition	Date	Location	Opponent	Score	Result
2020	World Group II play-offs	6–7 March	Alex Metreveli Tennis Club, Tbilisi (GEO)	Georgia	4–1	Win
2021	World Group II	17–18 September	Swiss Tennis Arena, Biel (SUI)	Switzerland	0–5	Loss
2022	World Group II play-offs	4–5 March	Forus Tenniscenter, Tallinn (EST)	Pacific Oceania	4–0	Win
2022	World Group II	16–18 September	Tennis Center Portorož, Portorož (SLO)	Slovenia	0–4	Loss
2023	World Group II play-offs	4–5 February	Eric Bell National Tennis Centre, Kingston (JAM)	Jamaica	2–3	Loss
2023	Europe Zone Group III	14 June	Herodotou Tennis Academy, Larnaca (CYP)	Montenegro	2–1	Win
2023	Europe Zone Group III	16 June	Herodotou Tennis Academy, Larnaca (CYP)	San Marino	3–0	Win
2024	World Group II play-offs	15–16 March	Sri Lanka Lawn Tennis Association Complex, Colombo (LKA)	Iran	3–1	Win
2024	World Group II	13–14 September	Sakhovat Sport Servis, Tashkent (USB)	Uzbekistan	1–3	Loss
2025	World Group II play-offs	31 January–1 February	Forus Tennisecenter Tondi, Tallinn (EST)	Venezuela	4–0	Win
2025	World Group II	12–14 September	Kalev Sports Hall, Tallinn (EST)	Mexico	1–3	Loss
2026	World Group II play-offs	7–8 February	Central Tennis Club Olympia, Windhoek (NAM)	Namibia	4–0	Win
2026	World Group II	18–20 September	(URU)	Uruguay		

== Current team (2026) ==
- Mark Lajal
- Markus Mölder
- Sten Hiiesalu
- Johannes Seeman

== See also ==
- Davis Cup
- Estonia Billie Jean King Cup team
