= 2026 Davis Cup World Group II =

Tennis competition

The 2026 Davis Cup World Group II will be held from 18 to 20 September 2026. The thirteen winners of this round will qualify for the 2027 Davis Cup World Group I play-offs while the thirteen losers will play at the 2027 Davis Cup World Group II play-offs.

== Teams ==
Twenty-six teams will participate in the World Group II, in series decided on a home and away basis.

These twenty-six teams are:

- 13 losing teams from the World Group I play-offs, held in February 2026
- 13 winning teams from the World Group II play-offs, held in February 2026

The 13 winning teams from the World Group II will play in the World Group I play-offs and the 13 losing teams will play in the World Group II play-offs in 2027.

#: Nations Ranking as of 9 February 2026.

Seeded teams

1. Portugal (#38)
2. Bosnia and Herzegovina (=#39)
3. Israel (#41)
4. Kazakhstan (#42)
5. Egypt (#44)
6. Romania (#46)
7. Ukraine (#47)
8. Morocco (#48)
9. Mexico (#49)
10. Uruguay (#50)
11. Tunisia (#51)
12. Lebanon (#52)
13. Hong Kong (#53)

Unseeded teams

- Estonia (#55)
- El Salvador (#56)
- Pakistan (#57)
- South Africa (#58)
- Slovenia (#59)
- Thailand (#60)
- Bolivia (#61)
- Cyprus (#62)
- Dominican Republic (#63)
- Syria (#64)
- Indonesia (#65)
- Nigeria (#66)
- Bermuda (#67)

== Results summary ==
Home team	Score	Away team	Location	Venue	Surface
El Salvador	0–3	Portugal [1]	Santa Tecla	Polideportivo Merliot	Hard
South Africa	0–4	Bosnia and Herzegovina [2]	Centurion	Irene Country Club	Hard
Slovenia	4–0	Israel [3]	Ljubljana	Tennis Academy Breskvar	Clay
Kazakhstan [4]	3–2	Thailand	Astana	Beeline Arena	Hard (i)
Dominican Republic	3–1	Egypt [5]	Santiago de los Caballeros	Centro Español	Clay
Indonesia	0–4	Romania [6]	Jakarta	Stadion Tenis Gelora Bung Karno	Hard
Cyprus	1–3	Ukraine [7]	Nicosia	National Tennis Centre	Hard
Morocco [8]	4–0	Nigeria	Rabat	Union Sportive des Cheminots de Tennis du Maroc	Clay
Bermuda	0–4	Mexico [9]	Hamilton	W.E.R. Joell Tennis Stadium	Hard
Uruguay [10]	4–0	Estonia	Montevideo	Círculo de Tenis de Montevideo	Clay
Tunisia [11]	3–0	Pakistan	Monastir	Skanes Family Resort	Hard
Syria	0–4	Lebanon [12]	Monastir (Tunisia)	Skanes Family Resort	Hard
Bolivia	3–1	Hong Kong [13]	Santa Cruz de la Sierra	Club de Tenis Santa Cruz	Clay

== Results ==
=== El Salvador vs. Portugal ===
El Salvador
0
Final de la Colonia Jardines de La Sabana
Santa Tecla, El Salvador
19–20 September 2026
Hard

Portugal
3

			1	2	3
1	(El Salvador) (Portugal)	Diego Durán; Nuno Borges	2; 6	1; 6
2	(El Salvador) (Portugal)	César Cruz; Jaime Faria	2; 6	2; 6
3	(El Salvador) (Portugal)	Marcelo Arévalo / César Cruz; Nuno Borges / Francisco Cabral	7^{7} 6^{5}	5; 7	2; 6
4	(El Salvador) (Portugal)	Juan Carlos Fuentes Vásquez; Henrique Rocha	4; 6	2; 2		not completed
5	(El Salvador) (Portugal)	Diego Durán; Jaime Faria				not played

=== South Africa vs. Bosnia and Herzegovina ===
South Africa
0
Irene Country Club
Centurion, South Africa
19–20 September 2026
Hard

Bosnia and Herzegovina
4

			1	2	3
1	(South Africa) (Bosnia and Herzegovina)	Philip Henning; Andrej Nedić	4; 6	4; 6
2	(South Africa) (Bosnia and Herzegovina)	Khololwam Montsi; Damir Džumhur	4; 6	5; 7
3	(South Africa) (Bosnia and Herzegovina)	Alec Beckley / Philip Henning; Mirza Bašić / Nerman Fatić	4; 6	4; 6
4	(South Africa) (Bosnia and Herzegovina)	Thando Longwe-Smit; Nerman Fatić	6^{2} 7^{7}	1; 6
5	(South Africa) (Bosnia and Herzegovina)	Khololwam Montsi; Andrej Nedić				not played

=== Slovenia vs. Israel ===
Slovenia
4
Tennis Academy Breskvar
Ljubljana, Slovenia
18–19 September 2026
Clay

Israel
0

			1	2	3
1	(Slovenia) (Israel)	Bor Artnak; Amit Vales	6; 3	6; 4
2	(Slovenia) (Israel)	Filip Jeff Planinšek; Orel Kimhi	7^{7} 6^{2}	6; 1
3	(Slovenia) (Israel)	Sebastian Dominko / Žiga Šeško; Daniel Cukierman / Ofek Shimanov	3; 6	7^{7} 6^{3}	6; 4
4	(Slovenia) (Israel)	Sebastian Dominko; Ben Weintraub	6; 3	6; 3
5	(Slovenia) (Israel)	Bor Artnak; Orel Kimhi				not played

=== Kazakhstan vs. Thailand ===
Kazakhstan
3
Beeline Arena
Astana, Kazakhstan
18–19 September 2026
Hard (i)

Thailand
2

			1	2	3
1	(Kazakhstan) (Thailand)	Alexander Shevchenko; Maximus Jones	6; 4	1; 6	7; 5
2	(Kazakhstan) (Thailand)	Timofey Skatov; Kasidit Samrej	6; 4	7^{7} 6^{4}
3	(Kazakhstan) (Thailand)	Denis Yevseyev / Beibit Zhukayev; Pruchya Isaro / Maximus Jones	4; 6	6; 3	5; 7
4	(Kazakhstan) (Thailand)	Alexander Shevchenko; Kasidit Samrej	6; 1	2; 6	3; 6
5	(Kazakhstan) (Thailand)	Timofey Skatov; Maximus Jones	6; 4	4; 6	6; 4

=== Dominican Republic vs. Egypt ===
Dominican Republic
3
Centro Español
Santiago de los Caballeros, Dominican Republic
18–19 September 2026
Clay

Egypt
1

			1	2	3
1	(Dominican Republic) (Egypt)	Roberto Cid Subervi; Amr Elsayed	6; 3	6; 2
2	(Dominican Republic) (Egypt)	Nick Hardt; Karim Mabrouk	6; 2	6; 3
3	(Dominican Republic) (Egypt)	Peter Bertran / Nick Hardt; Omar Kandil / Karim Mabrouk	7^{7} 6^{3}	3; 6	4; 6
4	(Dominican Republic) (Egypt)	Nick Hardt; Omar Kandil	6; 2	6; 1
5	(Dominican Republic) (Egypt)	Roberto Cid Subervi; Karim Mabrouk				not played

=== Indonesia vs. Romania ===
Indonesia
0
Gelora Bung Karno Sports Complex
Jakarta, Indonesia
18–19 September 2026
Hard

Romania
4

			1	2	3
1	(Indonesia) (Romania)	Gunawan Trismuwantara; Cezar Crețu	2; 6	4; 6
2	(Indonesia) (Romania)	Rafalentino Ali Da Costa; Radu Mihai Papoe	7^{7} 6^{5}	1; 6	2; 6
3	(Indonesia) (Romania)	Rafalentino Ali Da Costa / Ethan David Zapp; Ștefan Horia Haita / Radu David Țurcanu	2; 6	1; 6
4	(Indonesia) (Romania)	Lucky Candra Kurniawan; Gabriel Ghețu	6^{4} 7^{7}	6^{3} 7^{7}
5	(Indonesia) (Romania)	Gunawan Trismuwantara; Radu Mihai Papoe				not played

=== Cyprus vs. Ukraine ===
Cyprus
1
National Tennis Centre
Nicosia, Cyprus
19–20 September 2026
Hard

Ukraine
3

			1	2	3
1	(Cyprus) (Ukraine)	Photos Photiades; Georgii Kravchenko	4; 6	1; 6
2	(Cyprus) (Ukraine)	Melios Efstathiou; Oleksii Krutykh	2; 6	6; 1	4; 6
3	(Cyprus) (Ukraine)	Stylianos Christodoulou / Eleftherios Neos; Vladyslav Orlov / Oleksandr Ovcharenko	6; 3	6; 4
4	(Cyprus) (Ukraine)	Melios Efstathiou; Georgii Kravchenko	0; 6	1; 6
5	(Cyprus) (Ukraine)	Photos Photiades; Oleksii Krutykh				not played

=== Morocco vs. Nigeria ===
Morocco
4
Union Sportive des Cheminots de Tennis du Maroc
Rabat, Morocco
19–20 September 2026
Clay

Nigeria
0

			1	2	3
1	(Morocco) (Nigeria)	Karim Bennani; Canice Abua	6; 1	6; 2
2	(Morocco) (Nigeria)	Yassine Dlimi; Yusuf Abubakar	6; 1	6; 2
3	(Morocco) (Nigeria)	Walid Ahouda / Younes Lalami; Michael Emmanuel / Yusuf Abubakar	6; 3	6; 2
4	(Morocco) (Nigeria)	Amine Jamji; Michael Emmanuel	6; 3	6; 4
5	(Morocco) (Nigeria)	Yassine Dlimi; Canice Abua				not played

=== Bermuda vs. Mexico ===
Bermuda
0
W.E.R. Joell Tennis Stadium
Hamilton, Bermuda
19–20 September 2026
Hard

Mexico
4

			1	2	3
1	(Bermuda) (Mexico)	Daniel Phillips; Alan Magadán	4; 6	1; 6
2	(Bermuda) (Mexico)	Richard Mallory; Alex Hernández	4; 6	2; 6
3	(Bermuda) (Mexico)	Richard Mallory / Daniel Phillips; Luis Carlos Álvarez / Alan Magadán	2; 6	0; 6
4	(Bermuda) (Mexico)	Tariq Simons; Alan Fernando Rubio Fierros	0; 6	1; 6
5	(Bermuda) (Mexico)	Richard Mallory; Alan Magadán				not played

=== Uruguay vs. Estonia ===
Uruguay
4
Círculo de Tenis de Montevideo
Montevideo, Uruguay
19–20 September 2026
Clay

Estonia
0

			1	2	3
1	(Uruguay) (Estonia)	Joaquín Aguilar Cardozo; Markus Mölder	6; 2	6; 1
2	(Uruguay) (Estonia)	Franco Roncadelli; Kristjan Tamm	6; 4	6; 2
3	(Uruguay) (Estonia)	Ariel Behar / Francisco Llanes; Markus Mölder / Oliver Ojakäär	6; 4	7; 5
4	(Uruguay) (Estonia)	Francisco Llanes; Denis Maijorov	6; 4	6; 2
5	(Uruguay) (Estonia)	Joaquín Aguilar Cardozo; Oliver Ojakäär				not played

=== Tunisia vs. Pakistan ===
Tunisia
3
Magic Hotel Skanes Family
Monastir, Tunisia
18–19 September 2026
Hard

Pakistan
0

			1	2	3
1	(Tunisia) (Pakistan)	Aziz Dougaz; Muhammad Shoaib	6; 2	6; 3
2	(Tunisia) (Pakistan)	Moez Echargui; Muzammil Murtaza	6; 1	6; 1
3	(Tunisia) (Pakistan)	Moez Echargui / Aziz Ouakaa; Abid Ali Akbar / Muzammil Murtaza	6; 3	6; 3
4	(Tunisia) (Pakistan)	Moez Echargui; Muhammad Shoaib				not played
5	(Tunisia) (Pakistan)	Aziz Dougaz; Muzammil Murtaza				not played

=== Syria vs. Lebanon ===
Syria
0
Magic Hotel Skanes Family
Monastir, Tunisia
16–17 September 2026
Hard

Lebanon
4

			1	2	3
1	(Syria) (Lebanon)	Hazem Naw; Benjamin Hassan	6; 3	0; 6	4; 6
2	(Syria) (Lebanon)	Taym Al Azmeh; Fadi Bidan	2; 6	3; 6
3	(Syria) (Lebanon)	Taym Al Azmeh / Hazem Naw; Benjamin Hassan / Hasan Ibrahim	4; 6	4; 6
4	(Syria) (Lebanon)	Rabee Saleem; William Jade	2; 6	6; 3	6; 10
5	(Syria) (Lebanon)	Hazem Naw; Fadi Bidan				not played

=== Bolivia vs. Hong Kong ===
Bolivia
3
Club de Tenis Santa Cruz
Santa Cruz de la Sierra, Bolivia
18–19 September 2026
Clay

Hong Kong
1

			1	2	3
1	(Bolivia) (Hong Kong)	Hugo Dellien; Choi Fu-wang	6; 4	6; 1
2	(Bolivia) (Hong Kong)	Juan Carlos Prado Ángelo; Wong Tsz-fu	6; 2	6; 1
3	(Bolivia) (Hong Kong)	Murkel Dellien / Federico Zeballos; Siu Chi Nicholas Cheng / Wong Tsz-fu	6; 2	6; 2
4	(Bolivia) (Hong Kong)	Boris Arias; Tam Sin-hang	6; 1	6^{5} 7^{7}	11; 13
5	(Bolivia) (Hong Kong)	Juan Carlos Prado Ángelo; Choi Fu-wang				not played
