= Gabriel Francini =

Sammarinese tennis player

Francini, Gabriel
- Country (sports): San Marino
- Born: 12 December 1969 (age 55); La Plata, Argentina
- Plays: Right-handed

Doubles
- Career record: 0–1

Gabriel Francini (born December 12, 1969, in La Plata, Argentina) is a male former tennis player from San Marino.

Francini represented his native country in the doubles competition at the 1992 Summer Olympics in Barcelona, Spain, partnering Christian Forcellini. The pair was eliminated in the first round there.

Francini played in 25 Davis Cup ties for San Marino from 1993 to 2000, posting a 3–5 record in singles and a 3–15 record in doubles.
