= Konstantinos Efraimoglou =

Greek tennis player

Efraimoglou, Konstantinos
- Country (sports): Greece
- Born: 4 December 1962 (age 62); Athens, Greece
- Height: 1.88 m (6 ft 2 in)
- Plays: Left-handed
- Prize money: US$3,257

Singles
- Career record: 0–3
- Career titles: 0
- Highest ranking: No. 745 (March 18, 1985)

Doubles
- Career record: 1–5
- Career titles: 0
- Highest ranking: No. 854 (January 3, 1983)

Konstantinos Efraimoglou (Greek: Κωνσταντίνος Εφραίμογλου; born December 4, 1962, in Athens, Greece) is a male former tennis player from Greece.

Efraimoglou represented his native country in the doubles competition at the 1992 Summer Olympics in Barcelona, partnering Anastasios Bavelas. The pair was eliminated in the second round there.

The left-handed Efraimoglou represented Greece in the Davis Cup from 1984 to 1996, posting a 10–10 record in singles and a 12–11 record in doubles in twenty-six ties played.

Efraimoglou's highest ranking in singles was world No. 745, which he reached on March 18, 1985. His highest doubles ranking was world No. 854, which he reached on January 3, 1983.

He attended the University of Alabama and played for the Alabama Crimson Tide Tennis Team.
