= Poland Davis Cup team =

Poland Tennis Team

Poland
- Captain: Mariusz Fyrstenberg
- ITF ranking: 34 (3 February 2025)
- Highest ITF ranking: 17 (2 November 2015)
- Colors: Red & White
- First year: 1925
- Years played: 86
- Ties played (W–L): 173 (90-83)
- Best finish: World Group (2016)
- Most total wins: Bartłomiej Dąbrowski (37–25)
- Most singles wins: Bartłomiej Dąbrowski (28–19)
- Most doubles wins: Marcin Matkowski (31-10)
- Best doubles team: Mariusz Fyrstenberg & Marcin Matkowski (19–6)
- Most ties played: Marcin Matkowski (41)
- Most years played: Marcin Matkowski (19)

The Poland men's national tennis team represents Poland in Davis Cup tennis competition and are governed by the Polski Związek Tenisowy.

Poland currently compete in World Group I.

== Current team (2025) ==
- Olaf Pieczkowski
- Tomasz Berkieta
- Karol Drzewiecki (Doubles player)
- Jan Zieliński (Doubles player)

== History ==
Poland first played Davis Cup in 1925 (match with Great Britain loss 0–5) and contested in the World Group for the first time in 2016. Its best performance has been reaching the Europe/Africa Zone Group I second round.

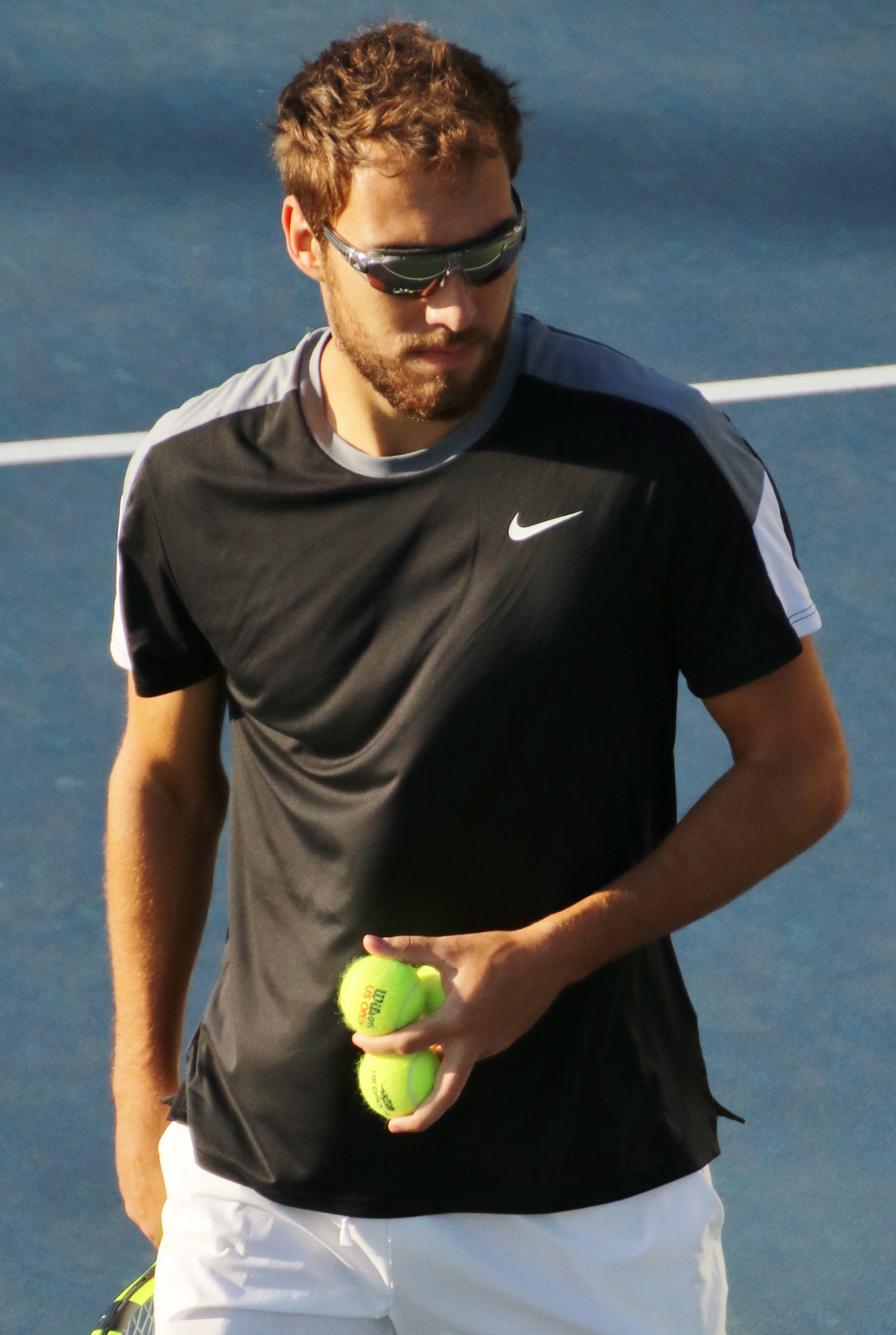
Jerzy Janowicz

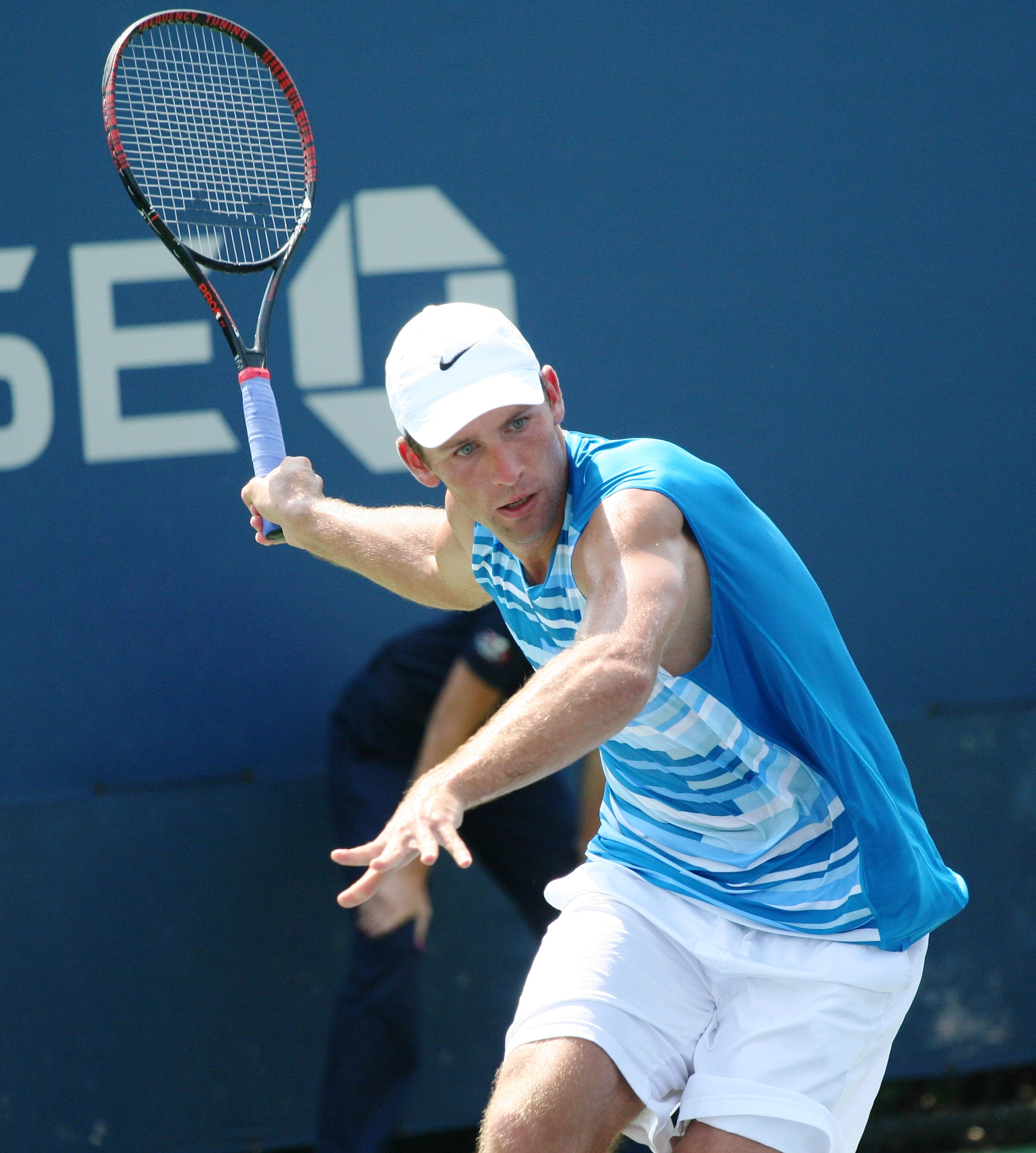
Łukasz Kubot

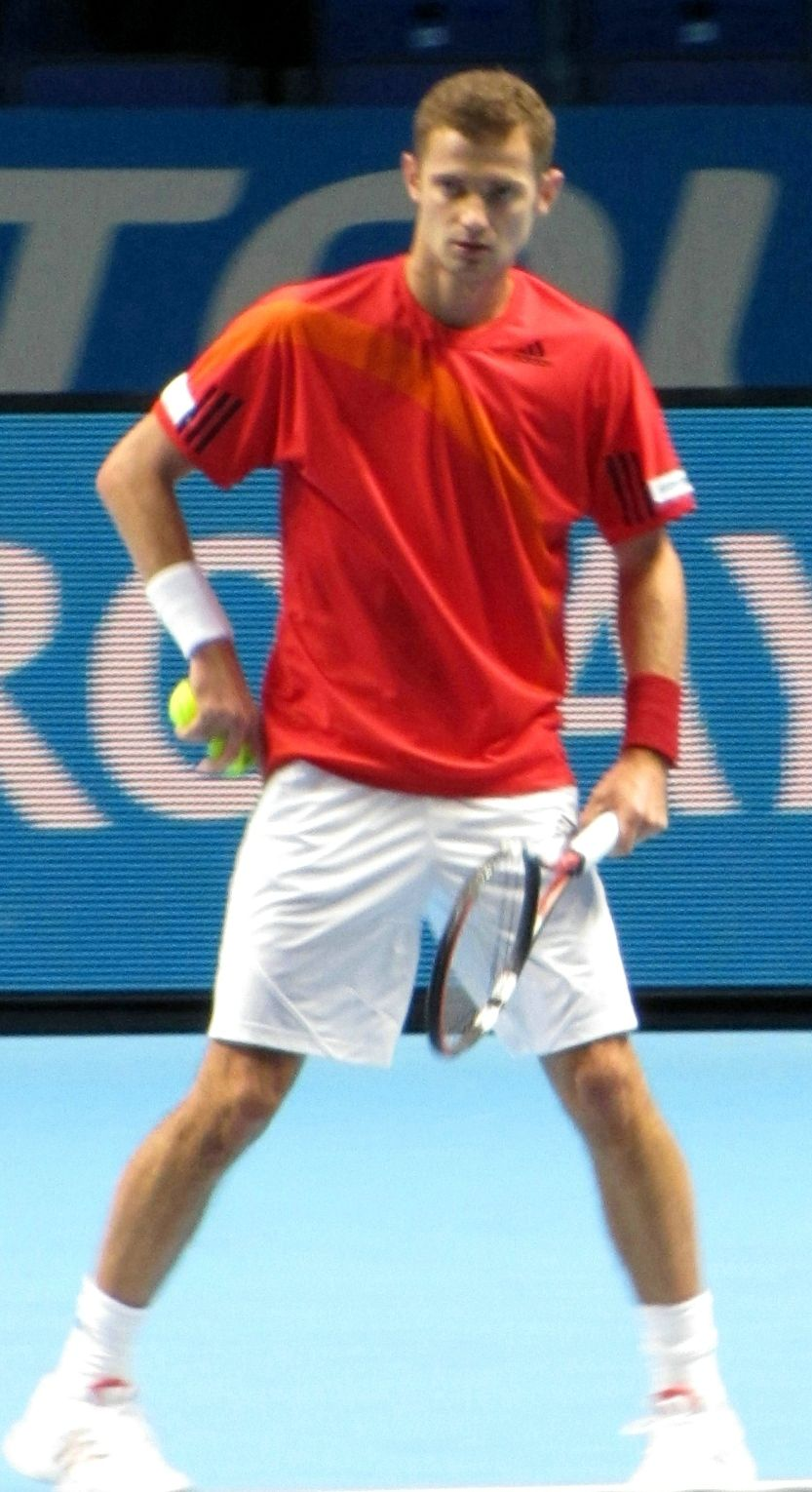
Mariusz Fyrstenberg

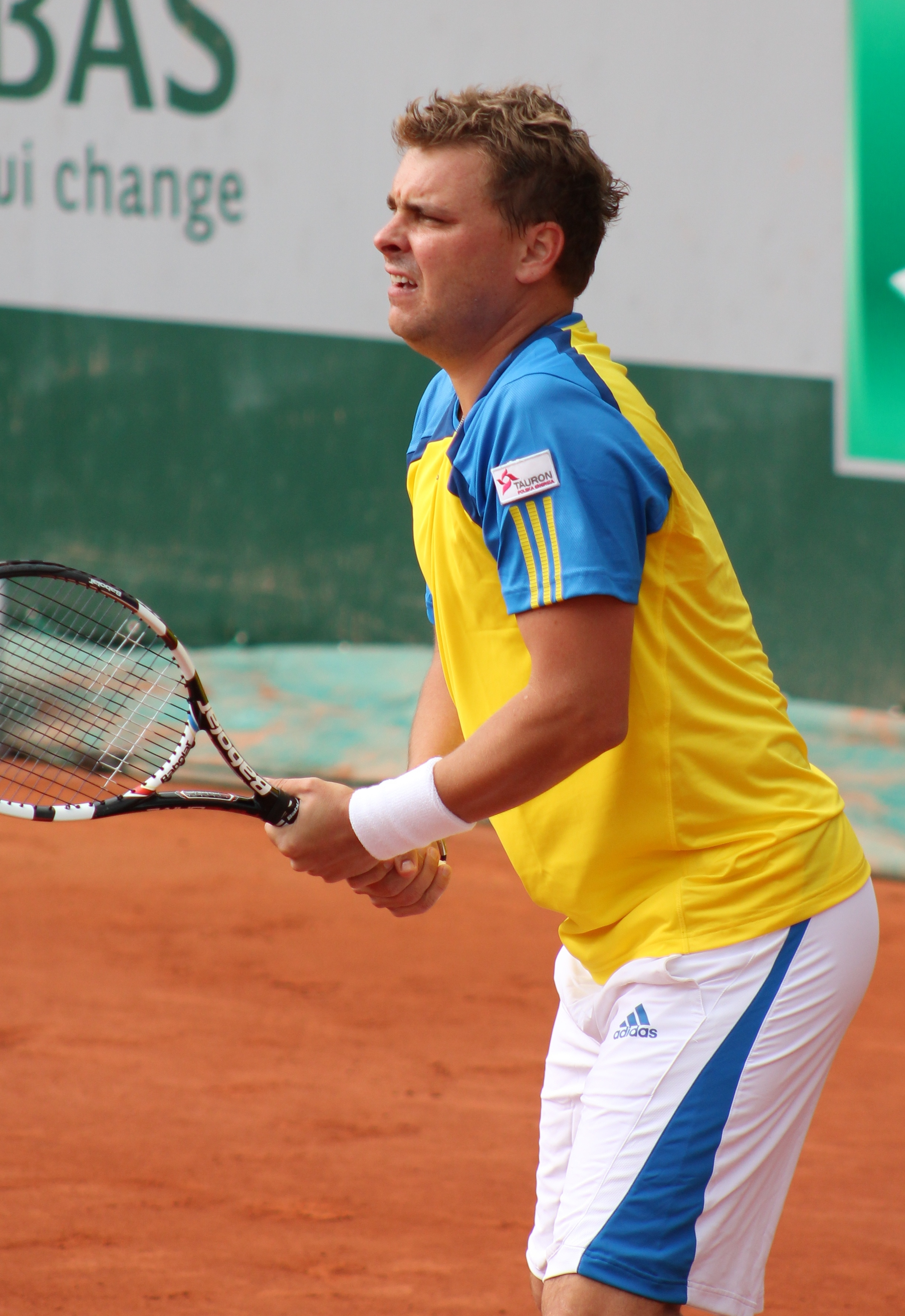
Marcin Matkowski

=== 2020–2029 ===
Year	Competition	Opponent	Date	Location	Score	Result
2026	World Group I play-offs					
2025	World Group I	Great Britain	12-13 Sep	Gdynia (Poland)	1–3	Loss
2025	World Group I play-offs	Georgia	31 Jan-01 Feb	Tbilisi (Georgia (country))	4–0	Win
2024	World Group I	South Korea	13-14 Sep	Zielona Góra (Poland)	1–3	Loss
2024	World Group I play-offs	Uzbekistan	2-3 Feb	Tashkent (Uzbekistan)	4–0	Win
2023	World Group II	Barbados	15-16 Sep	Kozerki (Poland)	4–0	Win
2023	World Group I play-offs	Japan	4-5 Feb	Miki (Japan)	0–5	Loss
2022	World Group II	Indonesia	16-17 Sep	Inowrocław (Poland)	5–0	Win
2022	World Group I play-offs	Portugal	4-5 Mar	Porto (Portugal)	0-4	Loss
2021	World Group II	El Salvador	5-6 Mar	Kalisz (Poland)	3-1	Win
2020	World Group II play-offs	Hong Kong	6-7 Mar	Kalisz (Poland)	4-0	Win

=== 2010–2019 ===
Year	Competition	Opponent	Date	Location	Score	Result
2019	Europe/Africa Zone Group III Play-off	Estonia	11-14 Sep	Athens (Greece)	2-0	Win
2019	Europe/Africa Zone Group III	Monaco	11-14 Sep	Athens (Greece)	3-0	Win
2019	Europe/Africa Zone Group III	Greece	11-14 Sep	Athens (Greece)	2-1	Win
2019	Europe/Africa Zone Group III	Luxembourg	11-14 Sep	Athens (Greece)	3-0	Win
2018	Europe/Africa Zone Group II, 3rd Round	Romania	15–16 Sep	Cluj-Napoca (Romania)	3–2	Win
2018	Europe/Africa Zone Group II, 2nd Round	Zimbabwe	7–8 Apr	Sopot (Poland)	4–1	Win
2018	Europe/Africa Zone Group II, 1st Round	Slovenia	3–4 Feb	Maribor (Slovenia)	3–2	Win
2017	Europe/Africa Zone Group I, Relegation Play-off	Slovakia	15–17 Sep	Bratislava (Slovakia)	1–4	Loss
2017	Europe/Africa Zone Group I, 1st Round	Bosnia and Herzegovina	3–5 Feb	Zenica (Bosnia and Herzegovina)	0–5	Loss
2016	World Group play-offs	Germany	16–18 Sep	Berlin (Germany)	3–2	Loss
2016	World Group, 1st Round	Argentina	4–6 Mar	Gdańsk (Poland)	2–3	Loss
2015	World Group play-offs	Slovakia	18–20 Sep	Gdynia (Poland)	3–2	Win
2015	Europe/Africa Zone Group I, 2nd Round	Ukraine	17–19 Jul	Szczecin (Poland)	3–1	Win
2015	Europe/Africa Zone Group I, 1st Round	Lithuania	6–8 Mar	Płock (Poland)	3–2	Win
2014	Europe/Africa Zone Group I, 2nd Round	Croatia	4–6 Apr	Warsaw (Poland)	1–3	Loss
2014	Europe/Africa Zone Group I, 1st Round	Russia	31 Jan – 2 Feb	Moscow (Russia)	3–2	Win
2013	World Group play-offs	Australia	13 – 15 Sep	Warsaw (Poland)	1–4	Loss
2013	Europe/Africa Zone Group I, Quarterfinal	South Africa	5–7 Apr	Zielona Góra (Poland)	3–1	Win
2013	Europe/Africa Zone Group I, 1st Round	Slovenia	1–3 Feb	Wrocław (Poland)	3–2	Win
2012	Europe/Africa Zone Group II, 3rd Round	Belarus	14–16 Sep	Łódź (Poland)	3–2	Win
2012	Europe/Africa Zone Group II, 2nd Round	Estonia	6–8 Apr	Inowrocław (Poland)	4–1	Win
2012	Europe/Africa Zone Group II, 1st Round	Madagascar	10–12 Feb	Warsaw (Poland)	5–0	Win
2011	Europe/Africa Zone Group I, 3rd Round	Finland	16–18 Sep	Espoo (Finland)	2–3	Loss
2011	Europe/Africa Zone Group I, 2nd Round	Israel	4–6 Mar	Ramat Hasharon (Israel)	2–3	Loss
2010	Europe/Africa Zone Group I, Relegation Play-off	Latvia	17–19 Sep	Riga (Latvia)	3–2	Win
2010	Europe/Africa Zone Group I, 1st Round	Finland	5–7 Mar	Sopot (Poland)	2–3	Loss

=== 2000–2009 ===
Year	Competition	Opponent	Date	Location	Score	Result
2009	Europe/Africa Zone Group I, Relegation Play-off	Great Britain	18-20 Sep	Liverpool (United Kingdom)	3–2	Win
2009	Europe/Africa Zone Group I, 2nd Round	Belgium	6-8 Mar	Angleur (Belgium)	1–4	Loss
2008	Europe/Africa Zone Group I, Relegation Play-off	Belarus	18–20 Jul	Minsk (Belarus)	4:1	Win
2008	Europe/Africa Zone Group I, 1st Round	Switzerland	8–10 Feb	Kreuzlingen (Switzerland)	1–4	Loss
2007	Europe/Africa Zone Group II, Final	Morocco	21–23 Sep	Puszczykowo (Poland)	4–1	Win
2007	Europe/Africa Zone Group II, 2nd Round	Greece	20– 22 Jul	Thessaloniki (Greece)	5–0	Win
2007	Europe/Africa Zone Group II, 1st Round	Nigeria	6–8 Apr	Abuja (Nigeria)	5–0	Win
2006	Europe/Africa Zone Group II, 2nd Round	Georgia	21–23 Jul	Gdynia (Poland)	2–3	Loss
2006	Europe/Africa Zone Group II, 1st Round	Latvia	7–9 Apr	Puszczykowo (Poland)	5–0	Win
2005	Europe/Africa Zone Group II, Relegation Play-off	Estonia	15–17 Jul	Gdynia (Poland)	5–0	Win
2005	Europe/Africa Zone Group II, 1st Round	Algeria	4–6 Mar	Algiers (Algeria)	2–3	Loss
2004	Europe/Africa Zone Group II, Final	Italy	24–26 Sep	Livorno (Italy)	2–3	Loss
2004	Europe/Africa Zone Group II, 2nd Round	Algeria	16–18 Jul	Gdynia (Poland)	4–1	Win
2004	Europe/Africa Zone Group II, 1st Round	Slovenia	9–11 Apr	Portorož (Slovenia)	3–2	Win
2003	Europe/Africa Zone Group II, Relegation Play-off	Monaco	11–13 Jul	Gdynia (Poland)	5–0	Win
2003	Europe/Africa Zone Group II, 1st Round	South Africa	4–6 Apr	Polokwane (South Africa)	2–3	Loss
2002	Europe/Africa Zone Group III, Play-off	Tunisia	12 May	Gdynia (Poland)	?-?	Win
2002	Europe/Africa Zone Group III, Play-off	Estonia	12 May	Gdynia (Poland)	3–0	Win
2002	Europe/Africa Zone Group III, Round Robin	Madagascar	11 May	Gdynia (Poland)	3–0	Win
2002	Europe/Africa Zone Group III, Round Robin	Tunisia	10 May	Gdynia (Poland)	2–1	Win
2002	Europe/Africa Zone Group III, Round Robin	Macedonia	9 May	Gdynia (Poland)	3–0	Win
2002	Europe/Africa Zone Group III, Round Robin	Cyprus	8 May	Gdynia (Poland)	3–0	Win
2001	Europe/Africa Zone Group II, Relegation Play-off	Yugoslavia	20–22 Jul	Belgrade (Federal Republic of Yugoslavia)	2–3	Loss
2001	Europe/Africa Zone Group II, 1st Round	Israel	27–29 Apr	Bytom (Poland)	2–3	Loss
2000	Europe/Africa Zone Group II, 2nd Round	Slovenia	21–23 Jul	Szczecin (Poland)	2–3	Loss
2000	Europe/Africa Zone Group II, 1st Round	Estonia	28–30 Apr	Bytom (Poland)	4–1	Win

=== 1990–1999 ===
Year	Competition	Opponent	Date	Location	Score	Result
1999	Europe/Africa Zone Group II, Semifinal	Morocco	24–26 Sep	Casablanca (Morocco)	0:5	Loss
1999	Europe/Africa Zone Group II, Quarterfinal	Ivory Coast	16–18 Jul	Abidjan (Ivory Coast)	3:1	Win
1999	Europe/Africa Zone Group II, 1st Round	Latvia	30 Apr–2 May	Jūrmala (Latvia)	3–2	Win
1998	Europe/Africa Zone Group II, Rel. Play-off	Egypt	17–19 Jul	Bydgoszcz (Poland)	4:1	Win
1998	Europe/Africa Zone Group II, 1st Round	Senegal	1–3 May	Dakar (Senegal)	2:3	Loss
1997	Europe/Africa Zone Group II, Semifinal	Finland	19–21 Sep	Helsinki (Finland)	2:3	Loss
1997	Europe/Africa Zone Group II, Quarterfinal	Ivory Coast	11–13 Jul	Bytom (Poland)	4:1	Win
1997	Europe/Africa Zone Group II, 1st Round	Ghana	2–4 May	Poznań (Poland)	5:0	Win
1996	Europe/Africa Zone Group II, Semifinal	Slovakia	20–22 Sep	Trnava (Slovakia)	1:4	Loss
1996	Europe/Africa Zone Group II, Quarterfinal	Belarus	12–14 Jul	Poznań (Poland)	4:1	Win
1996	Europe/Africa Zone Group II, 1st Round	Nigeria	3–5 May	Warsaw (Poland)	4:1	Win
1995	Europe/Africa Zone Group II, Rel. Play-off	Lithuania	14-16 Jul	Vilnius (Lithuania)	4:1	Win
1995	Europe/Africa Zone Group II, 1st Round	Nigeria	28–30 Apr	Lagos (Nigeria)	2:3	Loss
1994	Europe/Africa Zone Group II, Quarterfinal	Morocco	15–17 Jul	Warsaw (Poland)	0:5	Loss
1994	Europe/Africa Zone Group II, 1st Round	Bulgaria	29 Apr – 1 May	Sopot (Poland)	4:1	Win
1993	Europe/Africa Zone Group II, Rel. Play-off	Ivory Coast	16–18 Jul	Abidjan (Ivory Coast)	3:1	Win
1993	Europe/Africa Zone Group II, 1st Round	Bulgaria	30 Apr – 2 May	Sofia (Bulgaria)	2:3	Loss
1992	Europe/Africa Zone Group I, Rel. Play-off	Norway	1–3 May	Oslo (Norway)	1:4	Loss
1992	Europe/Africa Zone Group I, Quarterfinal	Hungary	31 Jan – 2 Feb	Budapest (Hungary)	2:3	Loss
1991	Europe/Africa Zone Group I, Semifinal	Great Britain	3–5 May	Warsaw (Poland)	1:4	Loss
1991	Europe/Africa Zone Group I, Quarterfinal	Romania	1–3 Feb	Poznań (Poland)	5:0	Win
1990	Europe Zone Group II, Final	Norway	20–22 Jul	Warsaw (Poland)	4:1	Win
1990	Europe Zone Group II, Semifinal	Bulgaria	15–17 Jun	Warsaw (Poland)	4:1	Win
1990	Europe Zone Group II, Quarterfinal	Luxembourg	4–6 Feb	Luxembourg	4:1	Win

=== 1980–1989 ===
Year	Competition	Opponent	Date	Location	Score	Result
1989	Europe/Africa Zone Group II, Quarterfinal	Greece	5–7 May	Warsaw (Poland)	2–3	Loss
1988	Europe/Africa Zone Group II, Semifinal	Greece	10–12 Jun	Athens (Greece)	1:3	Loss
1988	Europe/Africa Zone Group II, Quarterfinal	Luxembourg	6–8 May	Warsaw (Poland)	5:0	Win
1987	Quarterfinal	Romania	12–14 Jun	Brasov (Romania)	1:4	Loss
1987	1st Round	Zimbabwe	8–10 May	Harare (Zimbabwe)	3:2	Win
1986	Quarterfinal	Romania	13 – 15 Jun	Warsaw (Poland)	1:4	Loss
1986	1st Round	Finland	23–25 May	Warsaw (Poland)	3:2	Win
1985	1st Round	Zimbabwe	10–12 May	Warsaw (Poland)	2:3	Loss
1984	Quarterfinal	Israel	15–17 Jun	Jerusalem (Israel)	0:5	Loss
1984	1st Round	Greece	4–6 May	Warsaw (Poland)	4:1	Win
1983	1st Round	Belgium	6–8 May	Warsaw (Poland)	0:5	Loss
1982	1st Round	Morocco	7–9 May	Casablanca (Morocco)	2:3	Loss
1981	Quarterfinal	Monaco	12–14 Jun	Monte Carlo (Monaco)	2:3	Loss
1980	Preliminary Round	Finland	8–10 Feb	Helsinki (Finland)	0:5	Loss

=== 1970–1979 ===
Year	Competition	Opponent	Date	Location	Score	Result
1979	Quarterfinal	Italy	15-17 Jun	Warsaw (Poland)	1:4	Loss
1979	Preliminary Round	Finland	16–18 Mar	Warsaw (Poland)	4–1	Win
1978	Quarterfinal	Czechoslovakia	16–18 Jun	Prague (Czechoslovakia)	2–3	Loss
1978	Preliminary Round	Iran	17–19 Mar	Warsaw (Poland)	4–1	Win
1977	Quarterfinal	France	6–8 May	Warsaw (Poland)	0–5	Loss
1977	Preliminary Round	West Germany	22–24 Apr	Warsaw (Poland)	3–1	Win
1976	Preliminary Round	Norway	24–26 Sep	Poznań (Poland)	5–0	Win
1976	Preliminary Round	Italy	30 Apr – 2 May	Florence (Italy)	0–5	Loss
1975	Preliminary Round	Norway	12–14 Sep	Warsaw (Poland)	5–0	Win
1975	Preliminary Round	Sweden	2–4 May	Warsaw (Poland)	1–4	Loss
1974	Preliminary Round	Portugal	20–22 Sep	Poznań (Poland)	5–0	Win
1974	Quarterfinal	Sweden	17–19 May	Bastad (Sweden)	1–4	Loss
1974	Preliminary Round	Hungary	19–21 Apr	Warsaw (Poland)	3–2	Win
1973	Preliminary Round	Egypt	4–6 May	Cairo (Egypt)	1–4	Loss
1972	Semifinal	Soviet Union	9–11 Jun	Warsaw (Poland)	0–4	Loss
1972	Quarterfinal	Denmark	19–21 May	Copenhagen (Denmark)	5–0	Win
1972	1st Round	Yugoslavia	4–7 May	Warsaw (Poland)	3–1	Win
1971	1st Round	Hungary	30 Apr – 2 May	Budapest (Hungary)	0–5	Loss
1970	1st Round	Yugoslavia	7–9 May	Maribor (Socialist Federal Republic of Yugoslavia)	2–3	Loss

=== 1960–1969 ===
Year	Competition	Opponent	Date	Location	Score	Result
1969	Quarterfinal	South Africa	23–25 May		W/O	
1969	1st Round	Hungary	9–11 May	Warsaw (Poland)	3–2	Win
1968	1st Round	Belgium	3–5 May	Brussels (Belgium)	2–3	Loss
1967	Quarterfinal	Brazil	19–21 May	Warsaw (Poland)	0–5	Loss
1967	1st Round	Israel	5–7 May	Warsaw (Poland)	5–0	Win
1966	Semifinal	Brazil	10–12 Jun	Warsaw (Poland)	1–4	Loss
1966	Quarterfinal	Egypt	13–15 May	Warsaw (Poland)	4–1	Win
1966	1st Round	Sweden	29 Apr – 1 May	Szczecin (Poland)	3–2	Win
1965	1st Round	Sweden	30 Apr – 2 May	Stockholm (Sweden)	1–4	Loss
1964	1st Round	South Africa	1–3 May		W/O	
1963	1st Round	France	3–5 May	Paris (France)	0–5	Loss
1962	2nd Round	Brazil	18–20 May	Warsaw (Poland)	0–3	Loss
1962	1st Round	Norway	4–7 May	Oslo (Norway)	5–0	Win
1961	Quarterfinal	France	10-12 Jun	Warsaw (Poland)	0–5	Loss
1961	2nd Round	Monaco	2–4 Jun	Warsaw (Poland)	4–1	Win
1961	1st Round	Ireland	5–7 May	Dublin (Republic of Ireland)	5–0	Win
1960	2nd Round	Germany	13–15 May	Warsaw (Poland)	1–4	Loss
1960	1st Round	Romania	22-24 Apr	Bucharest (Romania)	3–2	Win

=== 1950–1959 ===
Year	Competition	Opponent	Date	Location	Score	Result
1959	2nd Round	Brazil	15–17 May	Warsaw (Poland)	2–3	Loss
1958	Semifinal	Italy	18–20 Jul	Warsaw (Poland)	1–4	Loss
1958	Quarterfinal	Mexico	6–8 Jun	Warsaw (Poland)	3–2	Win
1958	2nd Round	Switzerland	15–17 May	Lausanne (Switzerland)	4–1	Win
1957	Quarterfinal	Italy	7–9 Jun	Palermo (Italy)	1–4	Loss
1957	2nd Round	Chile	17–19 May	Warsaw (Poland)	3–2	Win
1957	1st Round	Luxembourg	27–29 Apr	Mondorf-les-Bains (Luxembourg)	5–0	Win
1956	Europe Zone, 2nd Round	Italy	12–14 May	Warsaw (Poland)	0–5	Loss
1956	Europe Zone, 1st Round	Austria	27–29 Apr	Warsaw (Poland)	3–2	Win
1955 - 1952	Not played					
1951	Europe Zone, Quarterfinal	Italy	17–19 Jun	Milan (Italy)	0–5	Loss
1951	Europe Zone, 2nd Round	Switzerland	18–20 May	Zürich (Switzerland)	4–1	Win
1950	Europe Zone, Semifinal	Sweden	13–15 Jul	Bastad (Sweden)	0–5	Loss
1950	Europe Zone, Quarterfinal	Ireland	8–10 Jun	Warsaw (Poland)	3–2	Win
1950	Europe Zone, 2nd Round	Israel	19–21 May	Warsaw (Poland)	5–0	Win

=== 1940–1949 ===
Year	Competition	Opponent	Date	Location	Score	Result
1949	Not played					
1948	Europe Zone, 1st Round	Italy	30 Apr – 2 May		W/O	
1947	Europe Zone, 2nd Round	Great Britain	15–17 May	Warsaw (Poland)	2–3	Loss
1946 - 1940	Not played (World War II)					

=== 1930–1939 ===
Year	Competition	Opponent	Date	Location	Score	Result
1939	Europe Zone, 2nd Round	Germany	19–21 May	Warsaw (Poland)	2:3	Loss
1939	Europe Zone, 1st Round	Netherlands	5–7 May	Warsaw (Poland)	4–1	Win
1938	Europe Zone, 2nd Round	Italy	19–21 May	Milan (Italy)	2–3	Loss
1938	Europe Zone, 1st Round	Denmark	5–7 May	Kraków (Poland)	5–0	Win
1937	Europe Zone, 2nd Round	Czechoslovakia	15–17 May	Warsaw (Poland)	0–5	Loss
1936	Europe Zone, 2nd Round	Austria	15–17 May	Vienna (Austria)	2–3	Loss
1935	Europe Zone, Quarterfinal	South Africa	17–19 May	Warsaw (Poland)	2–3	Loss
1934	Europe Zone, Qualifying Round	Greece	31 Aug – 2 Sep	Warsaw (Poland)	5–0	Win
1934	Europe Zone, Qualifying Round	Estonia	3–5 Aug	Warsaw (Poland)	5–0	Win
1934	Europe Zone, Qualifying Round	Belgium	20–22 Jul	Warsaw (Poland)	4–1	Win
1933	Europe Zone, Qualifying Round	Italy	4–6 Aug	Warsaw (Poland)	2–3	Loss
1933	Europe Zone, 1st Round	Netherlands	5–7 May	The Hague (Netherlands)	2–3	Loss
1932	Europe Zone, Quarterfinal	Great Britain	10-12 Jun	Warsaw (Poland)	1–4	Loss
1932	Europe Zone, 2nd Round	Netherlands	15–17 May	Warsaw (Poland)	4–1	Win
1931	Europe Zone, Quarterfinal	Denmark	20–22 May	Copenhagen (Denmark)	2–3	Loss
1931	Europe Zone, 2nd Round	Norway	13–15 May	Oslo (Norway)	3–0	Win

=== 1925–1929 ===
Year	Competition	Opponent	Date	Location	Score	Result
1929	Europe Zone, 2nd Round	Great Britain	10–12 May	Warsaw (Poland)	0–5	Loss
1928	Europe Zone, 1st Round	Denmark	4–6 May	Warsaw (Poland)	0–5	Loss
1927	Europe Zone, 2nd Round	Belgium	20–22 May	Brussels (Belgium)	0–5	Loss
1926	Europe Zone, 2nd Round	Great Britain	8–11 May	Harrogate (United Kingdom)	0–5	Loss
1925	Europe Zone, 1st Round	Great Britain	15–17 May	Warsaw (Poland)	0–5	Loss

== Head-to-head record ==
(+)

- Belarus 3–0
- Bulgaria 2–1
- Chile 1–0
- Ivory Coast 3–0
- Cyprus 1–0
- Egypt 2–1
- Estonia 6–0
- Ghana 1–0
- Greece 4–2
- Hong Kong 1–0
- Iran 1–0
- Ireland 2–0
- Latvia 3–0
- Lithuania 2–0
- Luxembourg 4–0
- North Macedonia 1–0
- Madagascar 2–0
- Mexico 1–0
- Monaco 3–1
- Netherlands 2–1
- Nigeria 2–1
- Norway 5–1
- Romania 3–2
- Russia 1–0
- Slovenia 2–1
- El Salvador 1–0
- Switzerland 2–1
- Tunisia 1–0
- Uzbekistan 1–0

(-)

- Argentina 0–1
- Australia 0–1
- Belgium 1–4
- Brazil 0–4
- Croatia 0–1
- Czechoslovakia 0–2
- Finland 2–4
- France 0–3
- Germany 1–2
- Great Britain 1–8
- Israel 2–3
- Italy 0–9
- Morocco 1–3
- Senegal 0–1
- Slovakia 0–1
- South Africa 1–2
- South Korea 0–1
- Soviet Union 0–1
- Sweden 1–4
- Yugoslavia 1–2

(=)

- Algeria 1–1
- Austria 1–1
- Denmark 2–2
- Hungary 2–2
- Georgia 1–1
- Portugal 1–1
- Zimbabwe 1–1

== See also ==
- Davis Cup
- Poland Billie Jean King Cup team
- Poland at the Hopman Cup
