= Christian Forcellini =

Sammarinese tennis player

- Country (sports): San Marino
- Born: 10 November 1969 (age 55)
- Plays: Right-handed

Doubles
- Career record: 0–1

Christian Forcellini (born November 10, 1969) is a male former tennis player and sprinter from San Marino.

Forcellini represented his native country in the doubles competition at the 1992 Summer Olympics in Barcelona, Spain, partnering Gabriel Francini. The pair was eliminated in the first round there.

Forcellini played in 6 Davis Cup ties for San Marino from 1993 to 1994, posting an 0–1 record in singles and a 2–4 record in doubles.

He is president of San Marino Tennis Federation and director of San Marino CEPU Open tournament. He was also national golf champion.

He also competed in athletics events as a sprinter, representing his country at the 1996 European Athletics Indoor Championships. He holds the Sammarinese record in the rarely contested 150 metres.

As of March 2025, Forcellini is personal assistant to San Marino's Secretary of State for Foreign Affairs.

Forcellini was confirmed as president of the Sammarinese Tennis Federation in December 2024.
