= Armand Strombach =

Latvian tennis player

- Full name: Armands Štrombahs
- Country (sports): Latvia
- Born: 29 April 1970 (age 55)

Singles
- Highest ranking: No. 443 (1 Aug 1994)

Grand Slam singles results
- Australian Open: Q2 (1995)

Doubles
- Highest ranking: No. 639 (16 May 1994)

Armand Strombach or Armands Štrombahs (born 29 April 1970) is a Latvian former professional tennis player.

Strombach, Soviet youth champion, was a member of Latvia's first ever Davis Cup team in 1993 and played with the side through to 1996, winning eight singles and four doubles rubbers. He featured in the qualifying draw for the 1995 Australian Open and reached a best singles ranking of 443 in the world.

Since 1990 he has lived in Berlin and has three children. His son, Latvian Davis Cup representative Robert Strombach (Roberts Štrombahs), and youngest daughter Santa, are both professional tennis players.
