= Blaž Trupej =

Slovenian tennis player

- Country (sports): Slovenia
- Born: 2 February 1972 (age 53); Ljubljana, Slovenia
- Plays: Left-handed
- Prize money: $10,112

Singles
- Career record: 6–7
- Career titles: 1
- Highest ranking: No. 571 (18 August 1997)

Doubles
- Career record: 4–3
- Career titles: 2 ITF
- Highest ranking: No. 413 (25 June 1990)

Blaž Trupej (born 2 February 1972) is a Slovenian tennis player.

Trupej has a career high ATP singles ranking of No. 571 achieved on 18 August 1997. He also has a career high ATP doubles ranking of 413 achieved on 25 June 1990.

Trupej represented Slovenia at the Davis Cup, where he had a W/L record of 10–10.
