= 2005 ITF Men's Circuit =

Details

Achievements (singles)

The 2005 ITF Men's Circuit was the 2005 edition of the third-tier tour for men's professional tennis. It was organised by the International Tennis Federation and is a tier below the ATP Challenger Tour. The ITF Men's Circuit included satellite events and 404 'Futures' tournaments played year round across six continents, with prize money ranging from $10,000 to $15,000.

== Futures events ==
$15,000 tournaments
$10,000 tournaments

=== January ===
Tournament	Date	City	Surface	Singles champions	Doubles champions
Germany F1 Futures $10,000	January 3	Nussloch; Germany	Carpet (i)	(Czech Republic) Robin Vik	(Germany) Philipp Petzschner (Germany) Lars Uebel
India F1 Futures $15,000	January 10	Mumbai; India	Hard (i)	(Germany) Simon Greul	(India) Mustafa Ghouse (India) Vishal Uppal
El Salvador F1 Futures $10,000	January 10	San Salvador; El Salvador	Clay	(Brazil) Thiago Alves	(Paraguay) Francisco Rodríguez (United States) Scott Schnugg
United Arab Emirates F1 Futures $15,000	January 10	Dubai; United Arab Emirates	Hard (i)	(Netherlands) Melvyn op der Heijde	(Azerbaijan) Emin Ağayev (Russia) Andrei Olhovskiy
USA F1 Futures $10,000	January 10	Tampa; USA	Hard	(Romania) Florin Mergea	(United States) Alex Kuznetsov (Germany) Mischa Zverev
Germany F2 Futures $10,000	January 10	Stuttgart; Germany	Hard (i)	(Croatia) Željko Krajan	(Germany) Philipp Petzschner (Germany) Lars Uebel
Great Britain F1 Futures $10,000	January 10	Leeds; Great Britain	Hard (i)	(United Kingdom) Andrew Banks	(United States) Eric Butorac (United States) Travis Rettenmaier
Guatemala F1 Futures $10,000	January 17	Guatemala; Guatemala	Hard	(United States) John Paul Fruttero	(Netherlands) Jean-Julien Rojer (Brazil) Márcio Torres
India F2 Futures $15,000	January 17	Delhi; India	Hard (i)	(Germany) Simon Greul	(India) Harsh Mankad (India) Ajay Ramaswami
Qatar F1 Futures $10,000	January 17	Doha; Qatar	Hard	(Greece) Vasilis Mazarakis	(Kazakhstan) Alexey Kedryuk (Russia) Dmitri Sitak
USA F2 Futures $10,000	January 17	Kissimmee, Florida; USA	Hard	(Venezuela) José de Armas	(United States) Alex Kuznetsov (Germany) Mischa Zverev
Germany F3 Futures $10,000	January 17	Oberhaching; Germany	Hard (i)	(Czech Republic) Robin Vik	(Poland) Adam Chadaj (Germany) Philipp Marx
Great Britain F2 Futures $10,000	January 17	Devon; Great Britain	Hard (i)	(United Kingdom) Matthew Smith	(United States) Scott Lipsky (United States) Brian Wilson
France F1 Futures $10,000	January 17	Deauville; France	Clay (i)	(Belgium) Steve Darcis	(Belgium) Steve Darcis (Belgium) Stefan Wauters
Costa Rica F1 Futures $10,000	January 24	San José; Costa Rica	Hard	(Netherlands) Jean-Julien Rojer	(United Kingdom) Matthew Hanlin (United States) David Martin
Qatar F2 Futures $10,000	January 24	Doha; Qatar	Hard	(Italy) Stefano Galvani	(Switzerland) Stéphane Bohli (Switzerland) Michael Lammer
USA F3 Futures $10,000	January 24	Key Biscayne, Florida; USA	Hard	(Romania) Horia Tecău	(United States) Nikita Kryvonos (United States) Denis Zivkovic
Germany F4 Futures $10,000	January 24	Kaarst; Germany	Carpet (i)	(Germany) Lars Uebel	(Germany) Bastian Knittel (Germany) Peter Mayer Tischer
France F2 Futures $10,000	January 24	Feucherolles; France	Hard (i)	(Belgium) Steve Darcis	(France) Josselin Ouanna (France) Jean-Michel Pequery
Austria F1 Futures $10,000	January 24	Anif; Austria	Carpet (i)	(Slovakia) Igor Zelenay	(Austria) Markus Krenn (Austria) Wolfgang Schranz
Colombia F1 Futures $15,000	January 24	Cartagena; Colombia	Hard	(Brazil) Thiago Alves	(United States) Shuon Madden (Colombia) Rubén Torres
Qatar F3 Futures $10,000	January 31	Doha; Qatar	Hard	(Algeria) Slimane Saoudi	(Kazakhstan) Alexey Kedryuk (Russia) Dmitri Sitak
Germany F5 Futures $10,000	January 31	Mettmann; Germany	Carpet (i)	(Germany) Markus Hantschk	(Germany) Lars Uebel (Germany) Marcel Zimmermann
France F3 Futures $10,000	January 31	Bressuire; France	Hard (i)	(Latvia) Andis Juška	(Italy) Francesco Caputo (Netherlands Antilles) Martijn van Haasteren
Austria F2 Futures $10,000	January 31	Bergheim; Austria	Carpet (i)	(Czech Republic) Ladislav Chramosta	(Ukraine) Nickolai Dyachok (Russia) Evgueni Smirnov
Mexico F1 Futures $15,000	January 31	Naucalpan; Mexico	Hard	(Serbia and Montenegro) Darko Mađarovski	(Mexico) Santiago González (Mexico) Alejandro Hernández
Spain F1 Futures $10,000	January 31	Murcia; Spain	Clay	(Italy) Fabio Fognini	(Spain) Antonio Baldellou-Esteva (Spain) Germán Puentes
Colombia F2 Futures $15,000	January 31	Bucaramanga; Colombia	Clay	(Brazil) Thiago Alves	(Brazil) Alexandre Bonatto (Brazil) Marcelo Melo

=== February ===
Tournament	Date	City	Surface	Singles champions	Doubles champions
Austria F3 Futures $10,000	February 7	Bergheim; Austria	Carpet (i)	(Georgia (country)) Lado Chikhladze	(Germany) Lars Uebel (Switzerland) Roman Valent
Mexico F2 Futures $15,000	February 7	Mexico	Hard	(Uruguay) Marcel Felder	(Mexico) Daniel Langre (Mexico) Víctor Romero
Spain F2 Futures $10,000	February 7	Murcia; Spain	Clay	(Spain) Gorka Fraile	(Spain) Antonio Baldellou-Esteva (Spain) Germán Puentes
Australia F1 Futures $15,000	February 14	Wollongong; Australia	Hard	(Chinese Taipei) Chen Ti	(Australia) Adam Feeney (Australia) Joel Kerley
New Zealand F1 Futures $15,000	February 14	Hamilton; New Zealand	Hard	(Greece) Vasilis Mazarakis	(Sweden) Alexander Hartman (United States) Scott Lipsky
Cuba F1 Futures $10,000	February 14	Havana; Cuba	Hard	(Cuba) Ricardo Chile	(Uruguay) Marcel Felder (Uruguay) Martín Vilarrubí
Spain F3 Futures $10,000	February 14	Totana; Spain	Hard	(Spain) Iván Navarro	(Spain) Marc Fornell Mestres (Spain) Marcel Granollers
Croatia F1 Futures $15,000	February 14	Zagreb; Croatia	Hard (i)	(Czech Republic) Robin Vik	(Czech Republic) Jakub Hasek (Czech Republic) Robin Vik
Australia F2 Futures $15,000	February 21	Gosford, NSW; Australia	Hard	(Israel) Dudi Sela	(Australia) Sadik Kadir (Australia) Robert Smeets
Brazil F1 Futures $15,000	February 21	Caldas Novas; Brazil	Hard	(Brazil) Francisco Costa	(Argentina) Brian Dabul (Argentina) Damián Patriarca
New Zealand F2 Futures $15,000	February 21	North Shore; New Zealand	Hard (i)	(Sweden) Alexander Hartman	(New Zealand) Mark Nielsen (New Zealand) Matt Prentice
USA F4 Futures $15,000	February 21	Brownsville, Texas; USA	Hard	(United States) Eric Nunez	(United States) Lester Cook (Canada) Rob Steckley
Spain F4 Futures $10,000	February 21	Cartagena (Murcia); Spain	Clay	(Spain) Gorka Fraile	(Spain) Marc Fornell Mestres (Spain) Alberto Soriano
Portugal F1 Futures $10,000	February 21	Faro; Portugal	Hard	(Portugal) Fred Gil	(Argentina) Agustin Tarantino (Argentina) Horacio Zeballos
Italy F1 Futures $15,000	February 21	Trento; Italy	Hard (i)	(Italy) Giorgio Galimberti	(Italy) Stefano Galvani (Italy) Daniele Giorgini
Croatia F2 Futures $15,000	February 21	Zagreb; Croatia	Hard (i)	(Croatia) Vjekoslav Skenderovic	(Slovenia) Rok Jarc (Slovenia) Boštjan Ošabnik
Brazil F2 Futures $10,000	February 28	Guarulhos; Brazil	Clay	(Brazil) Franco Ferreiro	(Brazil) Júlio Silva (Brazil) Rogério Dutra Silva
USA F5 Futures $15,000	February 28	Harlingen, Texas; USA	Hard	(United States) Eric Nunez	(United States) Scott Lipsky (United States) David Martin
Portugal F2 Futures $10,000	February 28	Lagos; Portugal	Hard	(France) David Guez	
Italy F2 Futures $10,000	February 28	Castel Gandolfo; Italy	Clay	(Romania) Adrian Ungur	

=== March ===
Tournament	Date	City	Surface	Singles champions	Doubles champions
USA F6 Futures $15,000	March 7	McAllen, Texas; USA	Hard	(Australia) Todd Reid	(United States) Scott Lipsky (United States) David Martin
Great Britain F3 Futures $10,000	March 7	Sunderland; Great Britain	Hard (i)	(Denmark) Frederik Nielsen	(Slovakia) Roman Kukal (Slovakia) Jan Stancik
France F4 Futures $15,000	March 7	Lille; France	Hard (i)	(Belgium) Steve Darcis	(India) Mustafa Ghouse (United Kingdom) David Sherwood
Portugal F3 Futures $10,000	March 7	Lagos; Portugal	Hard	(Portugal) Fred Gil	(Sweden) Rickard Holmstrom (Sweden) Christian Johansson
Italy F3 Futures $10,000	March 7	Siracuse; Italy	Clay	(Romania) Adrian Ungur	(Italy) Flavio Cipolla (Italy) Alessandro Motti
Great Britain F4 Futures $15,000	March 14	Bolton; Great Britain	Hard (i)	(Germany) Philipp Hammer	(Ghana) Henry Adjei-Darko (Ivory Coast) Valentin Sanon
France F5 Futures $15,000	March 14	Poitiers; France	Hard (i)	(Poland) Adam Chadaj	(France) Nicolas Renavand (France) Nicolas Tourte
India F3 Futures $10,000	March 14	Kolkata; India	Clay	(India) Vinod Sridhar	(India) Ajay Ramaswami (India) Vishal Uppal
Italy F4 Futures $10,000	March 14	Caltanissetta; Italy	Clay	(Italy) Stefano Galvani	(Greece) Konstantinos Economidis (Greece) Alexandros Jakupovic
Australia F3 Futures $15,000	March 21	Beaumaris, Victoria; Australia	Clay	(Greece) Vasilis Mazarakis	(Australia) Chris Guccione (Australia) Ryan Henry
India F4 Futures $15,000	March 21	Chennai; India	Clay	(India) Harsh Mankad	(India) Rohan Bopanna (India) Vijay Kannan
Italy F5 Futures $10,000	March 21	Catania; Italy	Clay	(Argentina) Agustin Tarantino	(Italy) Flavio Cipolla (Italy) Francesco Piccari
Morocco F1 Futures $15,000	March 21	Oujda; Morocco	Clay	(Morocco) Mounir El Aarej	(Slovakia) Ivo Klec (Czech Republic) Jaroslav Pospíšil
Australia F4 Futures $15,000	March 28	Frankston, Victoria; Australia	Clay	(Italy) Paolo Lorenzi	(Australia) Rameez Junaid (Australia) Jay Salter
Nigeria F1 Futures $15,000	March 28	Benin City; Nigeria	Hard	(Ghana) Henry Adjei-Darko	(South Africa) Raven Klaasen (Togo) Komlavi Loglo
France F6 Futures $15,000	March 28	Grasse; France	Clay	(France) Jérémy Chardy	(United States) Lesley Joseph (Kazakhstan) Evgeny Korolev
India F5 Futures $15,000	March 28	Bangalore; India	Hard	(Germany) Simon Greul	(Netherlands) Fred Hemmes (Netherlands) Jasper Smit
Italy F6 Futures $10,000	March 28	Frascati; Italy	Clay	(Argentina) Agustin Tarantino	(Italy) Stefano Cobolli (Italy) Vincenzo Santopadre
Morocco F2 Futures $15,000	March 28	Rabat; Morocco	Clay	(Slovakia) Ivo Klec	(Slovakia) Ivo Klec (Czech Republic) Jaroslav Pospíšil
Great Britain F5 Futures $15,000	March 29	Bath; Great Britain	Hard (i)	(Czech Republic) Petr Kralert	(United Kingdom) Mark Hilton (United Kingdom) Jonathan Marray

=== April ===
Tournament	Date	City	Surface	Singles champions	Doubles champions
Nigeria F2 Futures $15,000	April 4	Benin City; Nigeria	Hard	(Nigeria) Jonathan Igbinovia	(South Africa) Raven Klaasen (Togo) Komlavi Loglo
France F7 Futures $15,000	April 4	Angers; France	Clay (i)	(Kazakhstan) Evgeny Korolev	(Spain) Marc Fornell Mestres (Spain) Daniel Monedero
Italy F7 Futures $10,000	April 4	Napoli Averno; Italy	Clay	(Romania) Victor Ioniță	(Italy) Leonardo Azzaro (Italy) Giancarlo Petrazzuolo
Chile F1 Futures $10,000	April 4	Santiago; Chile	Clay	(Argentina) Juan Martín del Potro	(Argentina) Brian Dabul (Argentina) Damián Patriarca
Sri Lanka F1 Futures $10,000	April 4	Colombo; Sri Lanka	Clay	(Germany) Peter Mayer Tischer	(India) Ashutosh Singh (India) Vishal Uppal
USA F7 Futures $15,000	April 4	Little Rock, Arkansas; USA	Hard	(Austria) Zbynek Mlynarik	(United States) Tres Davis (United States) Scott Lipsky
Great Britain F6 Futures $10,000	April 5	Bath; Great Britain	Hard (i)	(United Kingdom) Mark Hilton	(United Kingdom) Ross Hutchins (United Kingdom) Martin Lee
Greece F1 Futures $15,000	April 11	Kalamata; Greece	Hard	(Bulgaria) Todor Enev	(France) Jean-François Bachelot (France) Gary Lugassy
Italy F8 Futures $10,000	April 11	Cremona; Italy	Hard	(Republic of Ireland) Kevin Sorensen	(Austria) Max Raditschnigg (Germany) Alexander Satschko
Chile F2 Futures $10,000	April 11	Santiago; Chile	Clay	(Argentina) Juan Martín del Potro	(Argentina) Brian Dabul (Argentina) Damián Patriarca
Japan F1 Futures $10,000	April 11	Kofu; Japan	Carpet	(Japan) Satoshi Iwabuchi	(South Korea) Im Kyu-tae (South Korea) Kwon Oh-hee
USA F8 Futures $15,000	April 11	Mobile, Alabama; USA	Hard	(United States) Todd Widom	(South Africa) Andrew Anderson (South Africa) Roger Anderson
Uzbekistan F1 Futures $15,000	April 11	Qarshi; Uzbekistan	Hard	(Uzbekistan) Denis Istomin	(Russia) Sergei Demekhine (Russia) Igor Kunitsyn
Kuwait F1 Futures $15,000	April 18	Mishref; Kuwait		(Romania) Florin Mergea	(Romania) Florin Mergea (Jamaica) Ryan Russell
Uzbekistan F2 Futures $15,000	April 18	Guliston; Uzbekistan		(Kazakhstan) Alexey Kedryuk	(Kazakhstan) Alexey Kedryuk (India) Sunil-Kumar Sipaeya
Mexico F3 Futures $10,000	April 18	Guadalajara; Mexico		(Brazil) Marcelo Melo	(South Africa) Andrew Anderson (South Africa) Roger Anderson
Greece F2 Futures $15,000	April 18	Syros; Greece	Hard	(Greece) Konstantinos Economidis	(Greece) Konstantinos Economidis (Greece) Alexandros Jakupovic
Italy F9 Futures $15,000	April 18	Bergamo; Italy	Clay	(Italy) Fabio Fognini	(Italy) Flavio Cipolla (Italy) Alessandro Motti
Japan F2 Futures $10,000	April 18	Hokuto; Japan	Clay	(Japan) Satoshi Iwabuchi	(United States) David Martin (New Zealand) Mark Nielsen
Chile F3 Futures $10,000	April 18	Santiago; Chile	Clay	(Argentina) Damián Patriarca	(Chile) Jorge Aguilar (Chile) Felipe Parada
Colombia F3 Futures $15,000	April 25	Cali; Colombia	Clay	(Colombia) Carlos Salamanca	(Brazil) Lucas Engel (Brazil) André Ghem
Japan F3 Futures $10,000	April 25	Shizuoka; Japan	Carpet	(New Zealand) Mark Nielsen	(United States) David Martin (United States) Michael Yani
Argentina F3 Futures $10,000	April 25	Córdoba; Argentina	Clay	(Argentina) Juan Martín del Potro	(Uruguay) Pablo Cuevas (Argentina) Horacio Zeballos
Italy F10 Futures $10,000	April 25	Padova; Italy	Clay	(Italy) Massimo Ocera	(Italy) Alberto Brizzi (Netherlands) Steven Korteling
Spain F5 Futures $10,000	April 25	Lleida; Spain	Clay	(Spain) David Marrero	(Spain) Pablo Andújar (Spain) Marc Fornell Mestres
Hungary F1 Futures $10,000	April 25	Budapest; Hungary	Clay	(Hungary) Sebő Kiss	(Israel) Amir Hadad (Israel) Harel Levy
Mexico F4 Futures $10,000	April 25	Celaya; Mexico	Hard	(United Kingdom) Jamie Baker	(Mexico) Pablo Martínez (Mexico) Carlos Palencia
Kuwait F2 Futures $15,000	April 25	Mishref; Kuwait	Hard	(India) Rohan Bopanna	(Lebanon) Patrick Chucri (Netherlands) Jasper Smit

=== May ===
Tournament	Date	City	Surface	Singles champions	Doubles champions
Mexico F5 Futures $10,000	May 2	Chetumal; Mexico	Hard	(Brazil) Felipe Lemos	(United States) Nick Rainey (United States) Brian Wilson
USA F9 Futures $10,000	May 2	Vero Beach, Florida; USA	Clay	(United States) Ryan Newport	(Ghana) Henry Adjei-Darko (Paraguay) Francisco Rodríguez
Thailand F1 Futures $10,000	May 2	Phuket; Thailand	Hard	(Australia) Alun Jones	(Germany) Patrick Knobloch (Germany) Dominik Meffert
Hungary F2 Futures $10,000	May 2	Miskolc; Hungary	Clay	(Slovakia) Frantisek Polyak	(Israel) Amir Hadad (Israel) Harel Levy
Uzbekistan F3 Futures $15,000	May 2	Namangan; Uzbekistan	Hard	(Uzbekistan) Denis Istomin	(South Africa) Raven Klaasen (Russia) Konstantin Kravchuk
Italy F11 Futures $10,000	May 2	Valdengo; Italy	Clay	(Switzerland) Michael Lammer	(Italy) Marco Crugnola (Italy) Stefano Ianni
Spain F6 Futures $10,000	May 2	Vic; Spain	Clay	(Spain) Didac Pérez	(Spain) Javier Foronda-Bolanos (Spain) Daniel Monedero
Romania F1 Futures $10,000	May 2	Bucharest; Romania	Clay	(Romania) Victor Crivoi	(Romania) Adrian Cruciat (Romania) Adrian Gavrilă
Argentina F4 Futures $10,000	May 2	Córdoba; Argentina	Clay	(Argentina) Jonathan Gonzalia	(Uruguay) Pablo Cuevas (Argentina) Horacio Zeballos
Korea Rep. F1 Futures $15,000	May 2	Seogwipo; Korea Rep.	Hard	(Australia) Robert Smeets	(Slovenia) Luka Gregorc (South Africa) Marcos Ondruska
Colombia F4 Futures $15,000	May 2	Pereira; Colombia	Clay	(Brazil) Bruno Soares	(Mexico) Daniel Garza (Argentina) Diego Hartfield
Korea Rep. F2 Futures $15,000	May 9	Seogwipo; Korea Rep.	Hard	(Japan) Satoshi Iwabuchi	(South Korea) Chung Hee-seok (South Korea) Im Kyu-tae
Argentina F5 Futures $10,000	May 9	Córdoba; Argentina	Clay	(Argentina) Diego Hartfield	(Argentina) Diego Cristin (Uruguay) Martín Vilarrubí
Brazil F3 Futures $10,000	May 9	Recife; Brazil	Clay (i)	(Brazil) Caio Zampieri	(Brazil) Marcelo Melo (Brazil) Alexandre Simoni
Italy F12 Futures $10,000	May 9	Vicenza; Italy	Clay	(Argentina) Guillermo Carry	(Argentina) Guillermo Carry (Italy) Giuseppe Menga
Romania F2 Futures $10,000	May 9	Bucharest; Romania	Clay	(France) David Guez	(Romania) Adrian Cruciat (Romania) Adrian Gavrilă
Spain F7 Futures $10,000	May 9	Lleida; Spain	Clay	(Spain) Daniel Gimeno Traver	(Spain) Guillem Burniol (Spain) Miguel Ángel López Jaén
Uzbekistan F4 Futures $15,000	May 9	Andijan; Uzbekistan	Hard	(Uzbekistan) Denis Istomin	(Russia) Andrei Stoliarov (Russia) Evgueni Smirnov
Hungary F3 Futures $10,000	May 9	Hódmezővásárhely; Hungary	Clay	(Serbia and Montenegro) Boris Pašanski	(Hungary) Norbert Pakai (Hungary) Tibor Szathmary
Thailand F2 Futures $10,000	May 9	Phuket; Thailand	Hard	(Germany) Simon Stadler	(Brazil) Josh Goffi (United States) Trevor Spracklin
USA F10 Futures $10,000	May 9	Orange Park, Florida; USA	Clay	(Venezuela) José de Armas	(United States) Nicholas Monroe (United States) Jeremy Wurtzman
USA F11 Futures $10,000	May 16	Tampa; USA	Clay	(Venezuela) José de Armas	(United States) Cody Conley (United States) Ryan Newport
Thailand F3 Futures $10,000	May 16	Phuket; Thailand	Hard	(Australia) Alun Jones	(Australia) Domenic Marafiote (United States) Michael Yani
Mexico F6 Futures $10,000	May 16	Aguascalientes; Mexico	Clay	(Australia) Raphael Durek	(Canada) Sanjin Sadovich (United States) Carl Thorsen
Morocco F3 Futures $10,000	May 16	Agadir; Morocco	Clay	(Algeria) Lamine Ouahab	(United States) Tres Davis (Brazil) Márcio Torres
Spain F8 Futures $10,000	May 16	Balaguer; Spain	Clay	(Spain) Bartolomé Salvá Vidal	(Spain) David Marrero (Spain) Carlos Rexach-Itoiz
Romania F3 Futures $10,000	May 16	Bacău; Romania	Clay	(Romania) Victor Crivoi	(Romania) Adrian Barbu (Netherlands) Mark Ijzerman
Bosnia & Herzegovina F1 Futures $10,000	May 16	Sarajevo; Bosnia and Herzegovina	Clay	(Serbia and Montenegro) Ilija Bozoljac	(Serbia and Montenegro) Ilija Bozoljac (Serbia and Montenegro) Goran Tošić
Italy F13 Futures $10,000	May 16	Grottaglie; Italy	Clay	(Kazakhstan) Andrey Golubev	(Italy) Stefano Mocci (Italy) Alessandro Piccari
Poland F1 Futures $10,000	May 16	Gdynia; Poland	Clay	(Poland) Bartłomiej Dąbrowski	(Poland) Maciej Diłaj (Poland) Dawid Olejniczak
Czech Rep. F1 Futures $10,000	May 16	Most; Czech Republic	Clay	(Czech Republic) Ladislav Chramosta	(Czech Republic) Jakub Hasek (Czech Republic) Josef Neštický
Brazil F4 Futures $10,000	May 16	Piracicaba; Brazil	Clay	(Brazil) Bruno Rosa	(Brazil) Lucas Engel (Brazil) André Ghem
China F1 Futures $10,000	May 16	Beijing; China P.R.	Hard	(China) Zhu Benqiang	(China) Yu Xinyuan (China) Zhu Benqiang
China F2 Futures $10,000	May 23	Tianjin; China P.R.	Hard	(China) Yu Xinyuan	(China) Yu Xinyuan (China) Zhu Benqiang
Japan F4 Futures $15,000	May 23	Munakata; Japan	Hard	(Germany) Simon Stadler	(United States) Phillip King (United States) Michael Yani
Brazil F5 Futures $10,000	May 23	Florianópolis; Brazil	Clay	(Argentina) Damián Patriarca	(Brazil) Lucas Engel (Brazil) André Ghem
Great Britain F7 Futures $10,000	May 23	Oxford; Great Britain	Grass	(Australia) Nathan Healey	(United Kingdom) Robert Green (United Kingdom) James May
Italy F14 Futures $10,000	May 23	Teramo; Italy	Clay	(Kazakhstan) Andrey Golubev	(Italy) Giuseppe Menga (Argentina) Juan-Francisco Spina
Romania F4 Futures $10,000	May 23	Bucharest; Romania	Clay	(Romania) Gabriel Moraru	(Romania) Adrian Barbu (Romania) Gabriel Moraru
Spain F9 Futures $10,000	May 23	Reus; Spain	Clay	(Austria) Marco Mirnegg	(Spain) Marc Fornell Mestres (Togo) Komlavi Loglo
Bosnia & Herzegovina F2 Futures $10,000	May 23	Brčko; Bosnia and Herzegovina	Clay	(Serbia and Montenegro) Ilija Bozoljac	(North Macedonia) Lazar Magdinčev (North Macedonia) Predrag Rusevski
Poland F2 Futures $10,000	May 23	Kędzierzyn-Koźle; Poland	Clay	(Austria) Rainer Eitzinger	(Poland) Maciej Diłaj (Poland) Dawid Olejniczak
Czech Rep. F2 Futures $10,000	May 23	Jablonec nad Nisou; Czech Republic	Clay	(Czech Republic) Jan Hájek	(Czech Republic) Daniel Lustig (Czech Republic) Josef Neštický
Morocco F4 Futures $10,000	May 23	Marrakesh; Morocco	Clay	(Algeria) Lamine Ouahab	(Netherlands) Romano Frantzen (Netherlands) Floris Kilian
Mexico F7 Futures $10,000	May 23	Morelia; Mexico	Hard	(Mexico) Carlos Palencia	(Mexico) Pablo Martínez (Mexico) Carlos Palencia
Morocco F5 Futures $10,000	May 30	Khemisset; Morocco	Clay	(Algeria) Lamine Ouahab	(Japan) Jun Kato (Venezuela) Igor Muguruza
Tunisia F1 Futures $10,000	May 30	Tunis; Tunisia	Clay	(Tunisia) Haythem Abid	(Tunisia) Haythem Abid (Tunisia) Malek Jaziri
Spain F10 Futures $10,000	May 30	Maspalomas; Spain	Clay	(Australia) Alun Jones	(Spain) Marcos Conde-Jackson (Russia) Denis Matsukevich
Romania F5 Futures $10,000	May 30	Bucharest; Romania	Clay	(Romania) Adrian Ungur	(Uruguay) Pablo Cuevas (Uruguay) Martín Vilarrubí
Slovenia F1 Futures $10,000	May 30	Kranj; Slovenia	Clay	(Slovenia) Grega Žemlja	(Slovenia) Rok Jarc (Slovenia) Grega Žemlja
Italy F15 Futures $10,000	May 30	Cesena; Italy	Clay	(Italy) Alessandro Piccari	(Argentina) Guillermo Carry (Venezuela) Jhonnatan Medina-Álvarez
Poland F3 Futures $10,000	May 30	Koszalin; Poland	Clay	(Poland) Filip Urban	(Poland) Maciej Diłaj (Poland) Dawid Olejniczak
Bosnia & Herzegovina F3 Futures $10,000	May 30	Prijedor; Bosnia and Herzegovina	Clay	(Serbia and Montenegro) Ilija Bozoljac	(North Macedonia) Lazar Magdinčev (North Macedonia) Predrag Rusevski
Czech Rep. F3 Futures $10,000	May 30	Karlovy Vary; Czech Republic	Clay	(Czech Republic) Jan Mertl	(Czech Republic) Jan Mertl (Czech Republic) Michal Navrátil
Japan F5 Futures $15,000	May 30	Munakata; Japan	Hard	(United States) Michael Yani	(South Korea) Im Kyu-tae (South Korea) Jun Woong-sun
China F3 Futures $10,000	May 30	Wuhan; China P.R.	Hard	(Australia) Robert Smeets	(China) Lu Hao (China) Yu Xinyuan

=== June ===
Tournament	Date	City	Surface	Singles champions	Doubles champions
Turkey F1 Futures $10,000	June 6	Ankara; Turkey	Clay	(Romania) Victor Crivoi	(Russia) Evgueni Smirnov (Ukraine) Sergei Yaroshenko
Slovenia F2 Futures $10,000	June 6	Maribor; Slovenia	Clay	(Slovenia) Grega Žemlja	(France) Vincent Baudat (Italy) Alessandro Motti
Italy F16 Futures $10,000	June 6	San Floriano; Italy	Clay	(Croatia) Mario Radić	(Italy) Luca Bonati (Italy) Flavio Cipolla
Romania F6 Futures $10,000	June 6	Iași; Romania	Clay	(Argentina) Martín Alund	
Spain F11 Futures $15,000	June 6	Tenerife; Spain	Hard	(Spain) Rafael Moreno-Negrin	(United States) Tres Davis (Netherlands) Jean-Julien Rojer
Tunisia F2 Futures $10,000	June 6	Hammamet; Tunisia	Clay	(Germany) Alexander Satschko	(Tunisia) Wael Kilani (Tunisia) Fares Zaier
Serbia & Montenegro F1 Futures $10,000	June 6	Belgrade; Serbia & Montenegro	Clay	(Serbia and Montenegro) Ilija Bozoljac	
Poland F4 Futures $10,000	June 6	Bytom; Poland	Clay	(Poland) Filip Urban	(Poland) Maciej Diłaj (Poland) Dawid Olejniczak
USA F12 Futures $15,000	June 6	Woodland, California; USA	Hard	(Venezuela) José de Armas	(United States) Nick Rainey (United States) Brian Wilson
USA F13 Futures $15,000	June 13	Auburn, California; USA	Hard	(United States) Ryan Newport	(United States) Nick Rainey (United States) Brian Wilson
Serbia & Montenegro F2 Futures $10,000	June 13	Belgrade; Serbia & Montenegro	Clay	(Slovakia) Kamil Čapkovič	(Italy) Fabio Colangelo (Italy) Marco Crugnola
Tunisia F3 Futures $10,000	June 13	Aldiana; Tunisia	Clay	(Tunisia) Malek Jaziri	(Tunisia) Walid Jallali (United States) Phil Stolt
Slovenia F3 Futures $10,000	June 13	Koper; Slovenia	Clay	(Slovenia) Grega Žemlja	(Austria) Marko Neunteibl (Austria) Christoph Palmanshofer
Italy F17 Futures $10,000	June 13	Bassano; Italy	Clay	(Italy) Massimo Ocera	(Argentina) Guillermo Carry (Italy) Giuseppe Menga
Romania F7 Futures $10,000	June 13	Bucharest; Romania	Clay	(Romania) Adrian Ungur	(Uruguay) Pablo Cuevas (Uruguay) Martín Vilarrubí
Finland F1 Futures $10,000	June 13	Savitaipale; Finland	Clay	(Finland) Tommi Lenho	(Mexico) Juan Manuel Elizondo (Mexico) Alfonso Pérez
France F8 Futures $15,000	June 13	Blois; France	Clay	(France) Édouard Roger-Vasselin	(Netherlands) Bart Beks (Netherlands) Matwé Middelkoop
Turkey F2 Futures $10,000	June 13	Istanbul; Turkey	Hard	(Israel) Amir Hadad	(Germany) Frank Moser (Germany) Bernard Parun
Japan F6 Futures $10,000	June 13	Kusatsu; Japan	Carpet	(Japan) Atsuo Ogawa	(United States) David Martin (New Zealand) Mark Nielsen
Spain F12 Futures $10,000	June 13	La Palma; Spain	Hard	(Spain) Marcel Granollers	(Russia) Dmitri Sitak (New Zealand) Artem Sitak
Romania F8 Futures $10,000	June 20	Bucharest; Romania	Clay	(Romania) Victor Crivoi	(Romania) Adrian Barbu (Romania) Ionuț Moldovan
Spain F13 Futures $15,000	June 20	Lanzarote; Spain	Hard	(Chinese Taipei) Jimmy Wang	(Togo) Komlavi Loglo (Spain) Rafael Moreno-Negrin
Finland F2 Futures $10,000	June 20	Vierumäki; Finland	Clay	(Germany) Benedikt Dorsch	(Estonia) Mait Künnap (Finland) Janne Ojala
France F9 Futures $15,000	June 20	Toulon; France	Clay	(Czech Republic) Jan Mertl	(Czech Republic) Jan Mertl (Italy) Giancarlo Petrazzuolo
Netherlands F1 Futures $15,000	June 20	Alkmaar; Netherlands	Clay	(Netherlands) Melvyn op der Heijde	(Belgium) Dominique Coene (Belgium) Stefan Wauters
Japan F7 Futures $10,000	June 20	Karuizawa; Japan	Clay	(South Korea) Kwon Oh-hee	(United States) David Martin (New Zealand) Mark Nielsen
Turkey F3 Futures $10,000	June 20	Istanbul; Turkey	Hard	(Bulgaria) Radoslav Lukaev	(North Macedonia) Lazar Magdinčev (North Macedonia) Predrag Rusevski
Italy F18 Futures $10,000	June 20	Castelfranco; Italy	Clay	(Italy) Massimo Ocera	(Italy) Flavio Cipolla (Italy) Simone Vagnozzi
Serbia & Montenegro F3 Futures $10,000	June 20	Belgrade; Serbia & Montenegro	Clay	(Serbia and Montenegro) Viktor Troicki	(Serbia and Montenegro) Darko Mađarovski (Serbia and Montenegro) Aleksander Slovic
USA F14 Futures $15,000	June 20	Chico, California; USA	Hard	(United States) Lesley Joseph	(United States) Jeremy Wurtzman (United States) Sam Warburg
Germany F6 Futures $10,000	June 27	Trier; Germany	Clay	(Germany) Andreas Beck	(Australia) Rameez Junaid (Germany) Markus Schiller
USA F15 Futures $10,000	June 27	Buffalo, New York; USA	Clay	(Brazil) Alexandre Simoni	(Philippines) Treat Huey (South Africa) Izak van der Merwe
Japan F8 Futures $10,000	June 27	Tokyo; Japan	Hard	(Japan) Go Soeda	(United States) KC Corkery (United States) James Pade
Italy F19 Futures $10,000	June 27	Pescara; Italy	Clay	(Italy) Marco Pedrini	(Chile) Alvaro Loyola (Chile) Juan-Felipe Yáñez
Romania F9 Futures $10,000	June 27	Hunedoara; Romania	Clay	(Hungary) Kornél Bardóczky	(Romania) Adrian Cruciat (Romania) Adrian Gavrilă
Netherlands F2 Futures $15,000	June 27	Heerhugowaard; Netherlands	Clay	(Germany) Denis Gremelmayr	(Colombia) Pablo González (Argentina) Nicolás Todero

=== July ===
Tournament	Date	City	Surface	Singles champions	Doubles champions
USA F16 Futures $10,000	July 4	Pittsburgh; USA	Clay	(Romania) Cătălin-Ionuț Gârd	(Australia) Robert Smeets (Australia) Daniel Wendler
Italy F20 Futures $10,000	July 4	Bologna; Italy	Clay	(Croatia) Mario Radić	(Argentina) Juan-Pablo Amado (Argentina) Jonathan Gonzalia
France F10 Futures $15,000	July 4	Bourg-en-Bresse; France	Clay	(Argentina) Diego Junqueira	(Argentina) Diego Junqueira (Argentina) Damián Patriarca
Spain F14 Futures $15,000	July 4	Alicante; Spain	Clay	(Spain) David Marrero	(Spain) David Marrero (Spain) Pablo Santos
Great Britain F8 Futures $10,000	July 4	Felixstowe; Great Britain	Grass	(France) Nicolas Tourte	
Germany F7 Futures $15,000	July 4	Kassel; Germany	Clay	(Germany) Denis Gremelmayr	(Germany) Kevin Deden (Germany) Sascha Klör
Austria F4 Futures $10,000	July 4	Telfs; Austria	Clay	(Slovenia) Rok Jarc	(Germany) Bastian Knittel (Germany) Christopher Koderisch
Romania F10 Futures $10,000	July 4	Focșani; Romania	Clay	(Romania) Victor Crivoi	(Chile) Jorge Aguilar (Brazil) Caio Zampieri
Romania F11 Futures $10,000	July 11	Pitești; Romania	Clay	(Romania) Andrei Mlendea	(United States) Shuon Madden (United States) Phil Stolt
Italy F21 Futures $10,000	July 11	Carpi; Italy	Clay	(Italy) Marco Pedrini	(Spain) Alberto Soriano (Czech Republic) Adam Vejmelka
France F11 Futures $15,000	July 11	Saint-Gervais; France	Clay	(France) Marc Gicquel	(France) Patrice Atias (France) Antoine Benneteau
Austria F5 Futures $10,000	July 11	Anif; Austria	Clay	(Czech Republic) Jaroslav Pospíšil	(Switzerland) Fabian Roetschi (Switzerland) Benjamin Rufer
Spain F15 Futures $15,000	July 11	Elche; Spain	Clay	(Spain) Pablo Andújar	(Spain) Pablo Andújar (Japan) Jun Kato
Great Britain F9 Futures $10,000	July 11	Frinton-on-Sea; Great Britain	Grass	(United Kingdom) Neil Bamford	(United Kingdom) Neil Bamford (United Kingdom) David Corrie
Germany F8 Futures $10,000	July 11	Düsseldorf; Germany	Clay	(Sweden) Jacob Adaktusson	(Belgium) Dominique Coene (Kazakhstan) Evgeny Korolev
USA F17 Futures $10,000	July 11	Peoria, Illinois; USA	Clay	(Romania) Cătălin-Ionuț Gârd	(Canada) Pierre-Ludovic Duclos (Brazil) Alexandre Simoni
USA F18 Futures $10,000	July 18	Joplin, Missouri; USA	Hard	(Brazil) Alexandre Simoni	(United States) John Isner (United States) Jeremy Wurtzman
Venezuela F1 Futures $10,000	July 18	Caracas; Venezuela	Hard	(Venezuela) Yohny Romero	(Venezuela) Piero Luisi (Venezuela) David Navarrete
China F4 Futures $15,000	July 18	Tianjin; China P.R.	Hard	(South Korea) Kwon Oh-hee	(China) Li Zhe (China) Wang Yu
Italy F22 Futures $10,000	July 18	Palazzolo; Italy	Clay	(Argentina) Diego Junqueira	(Italy) Daniele Giorgini (Italy) Matteo Volante
Austria F6 Futures $10,000	July 18	Kramsach; Austria	Clay	(Kazakhstan) Evgeny Korolev	(Austria) Marko Neunteibl (Austria) Christoph Palmanshofer
Spain F16 Futures $10,000	July 18	Gandia; Spain	Clay	(Spain) Héctor Ruiz-Cadenas	(Spain) Marc Fornell Mestres (Spain) Jordi Marse-Vidri
Romania F12 Futures $10,000	July 18	Bucharest; Romania	Clay	(Romania) Adrian Cruciat	(Chile) Jorge Aguilar (Chile) Felipe Parada
Romania F13 Futures $10,000	July 25	Târgu Mureş; Romania	Clay	(Spain) Cesar Ferrer-Victoria	(Chile) Jorge Aguilar (Chile) Felipe Parada
Spain F17 Futures $10,000	July 25	Dénia; Spain	Clay	(Spain) Guillem Burniol	(El Salvador) Rafael Arévalo (China) Zhu Benqiang
Germany F9 Futures $10,000	July 25	Leun; Germany	Clay	(Germany) Maximilian Abel	(Germany) Andre Begemann (Germany) Bastian Knittel
Italy F23 Futures $10,000	July 25	Foligno; Italy	Clay	(Italy) Alberto Brizzi	(Italy) Filippo Figliomeni (Italy) Matteo Marrai
China F5 Futures $15,000	July 25	Beijing; China P.R.	Hard	(Chinese Taipei) Chen Ti	(China) Zhang Yu (China) Yu Xinyuan
Lebanon F1 Futures $15,000	July 25	Jounieh; Lebanon	Clay	(Monaco) Benjamin Balleret	(Lebanon) Patrick Chucri (Sweden) Alexander Hartman
Venezuela F2 Futures $10,000	July 25	Caracas; Venezuela	Hard	(Venezuela) Jimy Szymanski	(Venezuela) Piero Luisi (Venezuela) David Navarrete
USA F19 Futures $10,000	July 25	Godfrey, Illinois; USA	Hard	(United States) Sam Warburg	(United States) Phil Stolt (United States) Sam Warburg

=== August ===
Tournament	Date	City	Surface	Singles champions	Doubles champions
USA F20 Futures $10,000	August 1	Decatur, Illinois; USA	Hard	(United States) Michael Yani	(United States) Tres Davis (United States) Brandon Davis
Venezuela F3 Futures $10,000	August 1	Caracas; Venezuela	Hard	(Venezuela) Yohny Romero	(Venezuela) Jhonnatan Medina-Álvarez (Venezuela) Román Recarte
Lebanon F2 Futures $15,000	August 1	Jounieh; Lebanon	Clay	(Monaco) Benjamin Balleret	(Lebanon) Patrick Chucri (Sweden) Alexander Hartman
Indonesia F1 Futures $10,000	August 1	Yogyakarta; Indonesia	Hard	(Brazil) Guilherme Ochiai	(Indonesia) Suwandi (Indonesia) Bonit Wiryawan
Senegal F1 Futures $10,000	August 1	Dakar; Senegal	Hard	(Ghana) Henry Adjei-Darko	(Nigeria) Candy Idoko (Nigeria) Lawal Shehu
Italy F24 Futures $10,000	August 1	L'Aquila; Italy	Clay	(Switzerland) Benjamin Rufer	(Netherlands) Robin Haase (Netherlands) Igor Sijsling
Latvia F1 Futures $10,000	August 1	Jūrmala; Latvia	Clay	(Norway) Stian Boretti	(Netherlands) Rick Schalkers (Netherlands) Bas van der Valk
Spain F18 Futures $10,000	August 1	Xàtiva; Spain	Clay	(France) Augustin Gensse	(Spain) Germán Puentes (Spain) Javier Ramos
Romania F14 Futures $10,000	August 1	Balș; Romania	Clay	(Ukraine) Nickolai Dyachok	(Romania) Teodor-Dacian Crăciun (Romania) Adrian Gavrilă
Serbia & Montenegro F4 Futures $10,000	August 1	Novi Sad; Serbia & Montenegro	Clay	(North Macedonia) Lazar Magdinčev	(Slovakia) Peter Miklusicak (Czech Republic) Lukáš Rosol
Germany F10 Futures $10,000	August 1	Ingolstadt; Germany	Clay	(Germany) Sebastian Rieschick	(Germany) Bastian Knittel (Republic of Ireland) Louk Sorensen
Italy F25 Futures $10,000	August 8	Avezzano; Italy	Clay	(Italy) Flavio Cipolla	(Italy) Fabio Colangelo (Italy) Alessandro Da Col
Croatia F3 Futures $10,000	August 8	Vinkovci; Croatia	Clay	(Croatia) Marin Čilić	(Croatia) Marin Čilić (Croatia) Ivan Dodig
Germany F11 Futures $10,000	August 8	Essen; Germany	Clay	(Germany) Benjamin Kohllöffel	(Germany) Sebastian Rieschick (Germany) Benedikt Stronk
Romania F15 Futures $10,000	August 8	Craiova; Romania	Clay	(Argentina) Pablo Galdón	(Romania) Adrian Barbu (Romania) Ionuț Moldovan
Serbia & Montenegro F5 Futures $10,000	August 8	Zaječar; Serbia & Montenegro	Clay	(Serbia and Montenegro) Aleksander Slovic	(Serbia and Montenegro) Dusan Mihailovic (Serbia and Montenegro) Goran Tošić
Mexico F9 Futures $10,000	August 8	Comitán; Mexico	Hard	(Mexico) Luis-Manuel Flores	(Australia) Ben Stapp (United States) Joe Schmulian
Indonesia F2 Futures $10,000	August 8	Semarang; Indonesia	Hard	(South Korea) Kwon Oh-hee	(Chinese Taipei) Kai-Lung Chang (Chinese Taipei) Yi Chu-huan
Nigeria F3 Futures $10,000	August 8	Lagos; Nigeria	Hard	(Ghana) Henry Adjei-Darko	(Ghana) Henry Adjei-Darko (Ghana) Gunther Darkey
USA F21 Futures $10,000	August 8	Kenosha, Wisconsin; USA	Hard	(United States) Ryan Newport	(United States) Cody Conley (United States) Ryan Newport
Iran F1 Futures $15,000	August 8	Tehran; Iran	Clay	(Austria) Philipp Müllner	(Monaco) Benjamin Balleret (France) Clément Morel
Russia F1 Futures $10,000	August 8	Sergiyev Posad; Russia	Clay	(Kazakhstan) Alexey Kedryuk	(Russia) Mikhail Elgin (Ukraine) Mikhail Filima
Lithuania F1 Futures $10,000	August 8	Vilnius; Lithuania	Clay	(Norway) Stian Boretti	(Norway) Stian Boretti (Norway) Frederick Sundsten
Argentina F6 Futures $10,000	August 8	Buenos Aires; Argentina	Clay	(Argentina) Máximo González	(Argentina) Leonardo Mayer (Argentina) Emiliano Massa
Argentina F7 Futures $10,000	August 15	Buenos Aires; Argentina	Clay	(Argentina) Lionel Noviski	(Argentina) Diego Cristin (Argentina) Máximo González
Slovak Rep. F1 Futures $10,000	August 15	Žilina; Slovakia	Clay	(Czech Republic) Jaroslav Pospíšil	(Czech Republic) Jaroslav Pospíšil (Slovakia) Adrian Sikora
Lithuania F2 Futures $10,000	August 15	Vilnius; Lithuania	Clay	(Germany) Simon Stadler	(Lithuania) Rolandas Murashka (Israel) Dekel Valtzer
Russia F2 Futures $10,000	August 15	Noginsk; Russia	Carpet	(Spain) Óscar Burrieza	(Russia) Mikhail Elgin (Ukraine) Mikhail Filima
Iran F2 Futures $15,000	August 15	Tehran; Iran	Clay	(Monaco) Benjamin Balleret	(Iran) Anoosha Shahgholi (Iran) Ashkan Shokoofi
Brazil F6 Futures $15,000	August 15	Caldas Novas; Brazil	Hard	(Brazil) Alexandre Simoni	(Brazil) Alexandre Bonatto (Brazil) Henrique Pinto-Silva
Nigeria F4 Futures $10,000	August 15	Lagos; Nigeria	Hard	(Ivory Coast) Valentin Sanon	(Nigeria) Abdul-Mumin Babalola (Nigeria) Sunday Maku
Indonesia F3 Futures $10,000	August 15	Makassar; Indonesia	Hard	(South Korea) Kwon Oh-hee	(Indonesia) Suwandi (Indonesia) Bonit Wiryawan
Mexico F10 Futures $10,000	August 15	Monterrey; Mexico	Hard	(Mexico) Daniel Langre	(Canada) Sanjin Sadovich (United States) Carl Thorsen
Romania F16 Futures $10,000	August 15	Arad; Romania	Clay	(Romania) Victor Crivoi	(Romania) Adrian Barbu (Romania) Ionuț Moldovan
Italy F26 Futures $15,000	August 15	Bolzano; Italy	Clay	(Italy) Alberto Brizzi	(Italy) Manuel Jorquera (Italy) Federico Torresi
Spain F20 Futures $15,000	August 15	Irun; Spain	Clay	(Algeria) Slimane Saoudi	(Spain) Marc Fornell Mestres (Spain) Daniel Monedero
Serbia & Montenegro F6 Futures $10,000	August 15	Sombor; Serbia & Montenegro	Clay	(Austria) Stefan Wiespeiner	(Serbia and Montenegro) Dusan Mihailovic (Serbia and Montenegro) David Savić
Croatia F4 Futures $10,000	August 15	Čakovec; Croatia	Clay	(Croatia) Gordan Peranec	(Croatia) Ivan Dodig (Croatia) Filip Siladi
Poland F5 Futures $10,000	August 15	Bełchatów; Poland	Clay	(Austria) Herbert Wiltschnig	(Poland) Tomasz Bednarek (Chile) Felipe Parada
Spain F21 Futures $15,000	August 22	Santander; Spain	Clay	(Spain) José Checa Calvo	(Spain) Esteban Carril (Spain) Gabriel Trujillo Soler
Croatia F5 Futures $10,000	August 22	Zagreb; Croatia	Clay	(Croatia) Ivan Cinkus	(Bosnia and Herzegovina) Zlatan Kadric (Bosnia and Herzegovina) Aldin Šetkić
Germany F12 Futures $10,000	August 22	Unterföhring; Germany	Clay	(Netherlands) Jesse Huta Galung	(Austria) Martin Slanar (Austria) Herbert Wiltschnig
Poland F6 Futures $10,000	August 22	Poznań; Poland	Clay	(Poland) Robert Godlewski	(Chile) Felipe Parada (Germany) Benedikt Stronk
Italy F27 Futures $10,000	August 22	San Benedetto del Tronto; Italy	Clay	(Italy) Daniele Giorgini	(Czech Republic) Josef Neštický (Italy) Federico Torresi
Romania F17 Futures $10,000	August 22	Bucharest; Romania	Clay	(Romania) Victor Crivoi	(Romania) Cătălin-Ionuț Gârd (Romania) Andrei Mlendea
Hungary F4 Futures $10,000	August 22	Kaposvár; Hungary	Clay	(Hungary) Kornél Bardóczky	(Italy) Alessandro Da Col (Czech Republic) Lukáš Rosol
Mexico F11 Futures $15,000	August 22	Tijuana; Mexico	Hard	(United States) Jason Marshall	(United States) Eric Butorac (United States) Chris Drake
Brazil F7 Futures $10,000	August 22	Canela; Brazil	Clay	(Brazil) Lucas Engel	(Brazil) Lucas Engel (Brazil) André Ghem
Russia F3 Futures $10,000	August 22	Korolev; Russia	Clay	(New Zealand) Artem Sitak	(Russia) Dmitri Sitak (New Zealand) Artem Sitak
Ecuador F1 Futures $10,000	August 22	Guayaquil; Ecuador	Hard	(United States) Jesse Witten	(Argentina) Brian Dabul (Uruguay) Marcel Felder
Argentina F8 Futures $10,000	August 22	Buenos Aires; Argentina	Clay	(Argentina) Máximo González	(Argentina) Matias O'Neille (Argentina) Emiliano Redondi
Argentina F9 Futures $10,000	August 29	Buenos Aires; Argentina	Clay	(Argentina) Juan-Martín Aranguren	(Argentina) Rodolfo Daruich (Argentina) Lionel Noviski
Ecuador F2 Futures $10,000	August 29	Guayaquil; Ecuador	Hard	(United States) Jesse Witten	(Venezuela) Jhonnatan Medina-Álvarez (Uruguay) Martín Vilarrubí
Hungary F5 Futures $10,000	August 29	Szolnok; Hungary	Clay	(Hungary) Kornél Bardóczky	(Hungary) Kornél Bardóczky (Hungary) Gergely Kisgyörgy
Brazil F8 Futures $10,000	August 29	Fortaleza; Brazil	Hard (i)	(Brazil) Alessandro Camarço	(Brazil) Marcelo Melo (Brazil) Antonio Prieto
Sudan F1 Futures $10,000	August 29	Khartoum; Sudan	Clay	(Romania) Bogdan Leonte	(Russia) Andemir Karanashev (Russia) Timur Lomtatidze
Mexico F12 Futures $10,000	August 29	Puerto Vallarta; Mexico	Hard (i)	(South Africa) Stephen Mitchell	(Mexico) Daniel Garza (Mexico) Víctor Romero
Japan F9 Futures $15,000	August 29	Kashiwa; Japan	Hard	(Japan) Toshihide Matsui	(United States) David Martin (United States) Michael Yani
Romania F18 Futures $10,000	August 29	Timișoara; Romania	Clay	(Romania) Teodor-Dacian Crăciun	(Romania) Artemon Apostu-Efremov (Germany) Thomas Gilner
Netherlands F3 Futures $15,000	August 29	Alphen aan den Rijn; Netherlands	Clay	(Netherlands) Jesse Huta Galung	(Argentina) Diego Álvarez (Estonia) Mait Künnap
Spain F22 Futures $15,000	August 29	Oviedo; Spain	Clay	(Spain) Gabriel Trujillo Soler	(Spain) Esteban Carril (Spain) Gabriel Trujillo Soler
Great Britain F10 Futures $10,000	August 29	Nottingham; Great Britain	Hard	(France) Jean-François Bachelot	(United Kingdom) Colin Fleming (United Kingdom) Jamie Murray
Germany F13 Futures $10,000	August 29	Nuremberg; Germany	Clay	(Germany) Marcel Zimmermann	(Germany) Matthias Bachinger (Germany) Philipp Piyamongkol
Poland F7 Futures $10,000	August 29	Szczecin; Poland	Clay	(Poland) Dawid Olejniczak	(Poland) Maciej Diłaj (Poland) Dawid Olejniczak
Croatia F6 Futures $10,000	August 29	Mali Lošinj; Croatia	Clay	(Slovenia) Boštjan Ošabnik	(Slovakia) Boris Borgula (Czech Republic) Jaroslav Pospíšil

=== September ===
Tournament	Date	City	Surface	Singles champions	Doubles champions
France F12 Futures $15,000	September 5	Bagnères-de-Bigorre; France	Hard	(Germany) Dominik Meffert	(Germany) Philipp Hammer (Germany) Dominik Meffert
Great Britain F11 Futures $10,000	September 5	Nottingham; Great Britain	Hard	(United Kingdom) Josh Goodall	(France) Olivier Charroin (Norway) Frederick Sundsten
Belarus F1 Futures $15,000	September 5	Minsk; Belarus	Clay	(Serbia and Montenegro) Darko Mađarovski	(Russia) Sergei Demekhine (Russia) Alexandre Krasnoroutskiy
Netherlands F4 Futures $15,000	September 5	Enschede; Netherlands	Clay	(Netherlands) Jesse Huta Galung	(Germany) Ralph Grambow (Germany) Sascha Klör
Germany F14 Futures $10,000	September 5	Kempten; Germany	Clay	(Republic of Ireland) Louk Sorensen	(Germany) Jerome Becker (Germany) Julian Reister
Poland F8 Futures $10,000	September 5	Gliwice; Poland	Clay	(Czech Republic) Michal Navrátil	(Czech Republic) Daniel Lustig (Slovakia) Michal Varsanyi
Italy F29 Futures $10,000	September 5	Como; Italy	Clay	(Italy) Marco Crugnola	(Italy) Marco Crugnola (Italy) Alessandro Da Col
Hungary F6 Futures $10,000	September 5	Budapest; Hungary	Clay	(Hungary) Kornél Bardóczky	(Serbia and Montenegro) Aleksander Slovic (Serbia and Montenegro) Viktor Troicki
Spain F23 Futures $10,000	September 5	Madrid; Spain	Hard	(Denmark) Frederik Nielsen	(Denmark) Frederik Nielsen (Denmark) Rasmus Nørby
Japan F10 Futures $15,000	September 5	Tokyo; Japan	Hard	(New Zealand) Mark Nielsen	(United States) Jonathan Chu (United States) David Martin
Algeria F1 Futures $10,000	September 5	Algiers; Algeria	Clay	(Algeria) Lamine Ouahab	(Czech Republic) Dušan Karol (Slovakia) Filip Polášek
Brazil F9 Futures $10,000	September 5	São Bernardo do Campo; Brazil	Clay	(Brazil) Alessandro Camarço	(Brazil) Alexandre Bonatto (Brazil) Marcelo Melo
Ecuador F3 Futures $10,000	September 5	Guayaquil; Ecuador	Clay	(Argentina) Brian Dabul	(Argentina) Brian Dabul (Colombia) Michael Quintero
Kenya F1 Futures $10,000	September 5	Mombasa; Kenya	Hard	(South Africa) Andrew Anderson	(South Africa) Andrew Anderson (United Kingdom) Myles Blake
Argentina F10 Futures $10,000	September 5	Rosario; Argentina	Clay	(Uruguay) Pablo Cuevas	(Argentina) Máximo González (Argentina) Damián Patriarca
Rwanda F1 Futures $10,000	September 12	Kigali; Rwanda	Clay	(Israel) Idan Rosenberg	(Zimbabwe) Genius Chidzikwe (Zimbabwe) Gwinyai Tongoona
Iran F3 Futures $15,000	September 12	Tehran; Iran	Clay	(Austria) Herbert Wiltschnig	(Austria) Philipp Müllner (Austria) Herbert Wiltschnig
Brazil F10 Futures $10,000	September 12	Florianópolis; Brazil	Clay	(Brazil) Bruno Rosa	(Brazil) Franco Ferreiro (Brazil) Marcelo Melo
Uruguay F1 Futures $10,000	September 12	Montevideo; Uruguay	Clay	(Argentina) Juan-Martín Aranguren	(Uruguay) Pablo Cuevas (Uruguay) Martín Vilarrubí
Argentina F11 Futures $10,000	September 12	Buenos Aires; Argentina	Clay	(Argentina) Máximo González	(Argentina) Máximo González (Argentina) Damián Patriarca
Algeria F2 Futures $10,000	September 12	Algiers; Algeria	Clay	(Algeria) Lamine Ouahab	(Algeria) Abdelhak Hameurlaïne (Algeria) Slimane Saoudi
USA F22 Futures $10,000	September 12	Claremont, California; USA	Hard	(Germany) Benedikt Dorsch	(United States) KC Corkery (United States) James Pade
Italy F30 Futures $15,000	September 12	Sassari; Italy	Hard	(Italy) Stefano Galvani	(Italy) Adriano Biasella (Kazakhstan) Andrey Golubev
France F13 Futures $15,000	September 12	Mulhouse; France	Hard (i)	(Kazakhstan) Evgeny Korolev	(United Kingdom) James Auckland (Russia) Kirill Ivanov-Smolensky
Sweden F1 Futures $10,000	September 12	Gothenburg; Sweden	Hard (i)	(Sweden) Johan Settergren	(Sweden) Rickard Holmstrom (Sweden) Christian Johansson
Spain F24 Futures $15,000	September 12	Móstoles; Spain	Hard	(Italy) Marco Pedrini	(Netherlands) Michel Koning (Netherlands) Jasper Smit
Belarus F2 Futures $15,000	September 12	Minsk; Belarus	Hard	(Russia) Pavel Ivanov	(Russia) Sergei Demekhine (Russia) Alexandre Krasnoroutskiy
Germany F15 Futures $10,000	September 12	Friedberg; Germany	Clay	(Latvia) Ernests Gulbis	(Germany) Jerome Becker (Germany) Julian Reister
Great Britain F12 Futures $10,000	September 19	Glasgow; Great Britain	Hard (i)	(United Kingdom) Matthew Smith	(United Kingdom) Colin Fleming (United Kingdom) Jamie Murray
France F14 Futures $15,000	September 19	Plaisir; France	Hard (i)	(Switzerland) Roman Valent	(Australia) Rameez Junaid (Germany) Philipp Marx
Sweden F2 Futures $10,000	September 19	Gothenburg; Sweden	Hard (i)	(Sweden) Johan Settergren	(Sweden) Ervin Eleskovic (Sweden) Johan Settergren
Spain F25 Futures $15,000	September 19	Madrid; Spain	Hard	(Netherlands) Michel Koning	(Netherlands) Michel Koning (Netherlands) Jasper Smit
Italy F31 Futures $15,000	September 19	Oristano; Italy	Hard	(Italy) Stefano Galvani	(Italy) Stefano Galvani (Bosnia and Herzegovina) Ismar Gorčić
USA F23 Futures $10,000	September 19	Costa Mesa, California; USA	Hard	(United States) Sam Warburg	(United States) Scott Lipsky (United States) David Martin
Algeria F3 Futures $10,000	September 19	Algiers; Algeria	Clay	(Algeria) Slimane Saoudi	(Algeria) Abdelhak Hameurlaïne (Algeria) Slimane Saoudi
Argentina F12 Futures $10,000	September 19	Buenos Aires; Argentina	Clay	(Argentina) Juan-Martín Aranguren	(Argentina) Leonardo Mayer (Argentina) Emiliano Massa
Brazil F11 Futures $10,000	September 19	Porto Alegre; Brazil	Clay	(Brazil) Lucas Engel	(Brazil) Rodrigo-Antonio Grilli (Brazil) Caio Zampieri
Iran F4 Futures $15,000	September 19	Tehran; Iran	Clay	(Austria) Herbert Wiltschnig	(Germany) Nils Muschiol (Czech Republic) Jan Mertl
Australia F5 Futures $10,000	September 19	Rockhampton; Australia	Hard	(Australia) Robert Smeets	(Australia) Luke Bourgeois (Australia) Steven Goh
Australia F6 Futures $15,000	September 26	Brisbane; Australia	Hard	(Serbia and Montenegro) Alex Vlaški	(Australia) Sadik Kadir (Australia) Joel Kerley
Bolivia F1 Futures $15,000	September 26	Cochabamba; Bolivia	Clay	(Argentina) Agustin Tarantino	(Argentina) Alejandro Fabbri (Uruguay) Martín Vilarrubí
Ukraine F1 Futures $10,000	September 26	Gorlovka; Ukraine	Clay	(Cyprus) Photos Kallias	(Russia) Alexander Markin (Latvia) Deniss Pavlovs
Colombia F5 Futures $15,000	September 26	Barranquilla; Colombia	Clay	(Argentina) Brian Dabul	(Argentina) Luciano Vitullo (Argentina) Horacio Zeballos
USA F24 Futures $10,000	September 26	Irvine, California; USA	Hard	(United States) Tyler Cleveland	(United States) Tyler Cleveland (United States) Dave Lingman
Venezuela F4 Futures $10,000	September 26	Caracas; Venezuela	Hard	(Venezuela) Yohny Romero	(Brazil) Marcelo Melo (Brazil) Márcio Torres
Italy F32 Futures $10,000	September 26	Olbia; Italy	Clay	(Slovakia) Lukáš Lacko	(Croatia) Ivan Cerović (Uzbekistan) Farrukh Dustov
Great Britain F13 Futures $10,000	September 26	Edinburgh; Great Britain	Hard (i)	(United Kingdom) Mark Hilton	(United Kingdom) Colin Fleming (United Kingdom) Jamie Murray
France F15 Futures $10,000	September 26	Sarreguemines; France	Hard (i)	(Iran) Benjamin Ebrahimzadeh	(France) Patrice Atias (France) Antoine Benneteau
Sweden F3 Futures $10,000	September 26	Falun; Sweden	Carpet (i)	(Sweden) Johan Settergren	(Norway) Stian Boretti (Finland) Lauri Kiiski
Spain F26 Futures $15,000	September 26	Martos; Spain	Hard	(Spain) Marcel Granollers	(Netherlands) Michel Koning (Netherlands) Jasper Smit

=== October ===
Tournament	Date	City	Surface	Singles champions	Doubles champions
Colombia F6 Futures $15,000	October 3	Medellín; Colombia	Clay	(Colombia) Santiago Giraldo	(Chile) Felipe Parada (Argentina) Luciano Vitullo
Mexico F13 Futures $10,000	October 3	Torreón; Mexico	Hard	(Poland) Dawid Olejniczak	(Poland) Michal Domanski (Poland) Dawid Olejniczak
Venezuela F5 Futures $10,000	October 3	Caracas; Venezuela	Hard	(Portugal) Fred Gil	(Cuba) Ricardo Chile (Cuba) Sandor Martínez
USA F25 Futures $10,000	October 3	Laguna Niguel, California; USA	Hard	(Germany) Benjamin Becker	(Canada) Érik Chvojka (Canada) Philip Gubenco
Australia F7 Futures $15,000	October 3	Kawana; Australia	Hard	(Germany) Gero Kretschmer	(Australia) Robert Smeets (Serbia and Montenegro) Alex Vlaški
Bolivia F2 Futures $15,000	October 3	Santa Cruz; Bolivia	Clay	(Argentina) Antonio Pastorino	(Argentina) Alejandro Fabbri (Uruguay) Martín Vilarrubí
Italy F33 Futures $10,000	October 3	Arzachena; Italy	Hard	(Germany) Tony Holzinger	(Italy) Alessandro Accardo (Italy) Adriano Biasella
Great Britain F14 Futures $10,000	October 3	Bolton; Great Britain	Hard (i)	(United Kingdom) Jamie Baker	(United Kingdom) Ross Hutchins (United Kingdom) Jamie Murray
France F16 Futures $15,000	October 3	Nevers; France	Hard (i)	(Romania) Florin Mergea	(France) Julien Jeanpierre (France) Jean-Michel Pequery
Spain F27 Futures $15,000	October 3	El Ejido; Spain	Hard	(Spain) David Marrero	(Spain) Marcel Granollers (Spain) David Marrero
Ukraine F2 Futures $10,000	October 3	Cherkasy; Ukraine	Clay	(Slovakia) Lukáš Lacko	(Ukraine) Mikhail Filima (Ukraine) Orest Tereshchuk
Italy F34 Futures $10,000	October 10	Sassari; Italy	Clay	(Italy) Stefano Galvani	(Uzbekistan) Farrukh Dustov (Italy) Manuel Gasbarri
Great Britain F15 Futures $10,000	October 10	Jersey; Great Britain	Hard (i)	(United Kingdom) Matthew Smith	(United Kingdom) David Corrie (United States) Phil Stolt
France F17 Futures $15,000	October 10	Saint-Dizier; France	Hard (i)	(France) Jo-Wilfried Tsonga	(Slovenia) Rok Jarc (Slovenia) Grega Žemlja
Spain F28 Futures $10,000	October 10	Córdoba; Spain	Hard	(Italy) Alessandro Da Col	(Italy) Fabio Colangelo (Italy) Alessandro Da Col
Ukraine F3 Futures $10,000	October 10	Illichivsk; Ukraine	Clay	(Cyprus) Photos Kallias	(Ukraine) Sergey Bubka (Ukraine) Mikhail Filima
Australia F8 Futures $15,000	October 10	Queensland; Australia	Hard	(Australia) Robert Smeets	(Australia) Adam Feeney (Australia) Robert Smeets
Botswana F1 Futures $10,000	October 10	Gaborone; Botswana	Hard	(South Africa) Andrew Anderson	(United States) Nicholas Monroe (South Africa) Izak van der Merwe
Venezuela F6 Futures $10,000	October 10	Valencia; Venezuela	Hard	(United States) Matthew Behrmann	(Venezuela) Piero Luisi (Venezuela) David Navarrete
Nigeria F5 Futures $15,000	October 10	Lagos; Nigeria	Hard	(Ghana) Henry Adjei-Darko	(El Salvador) Rafael Arévalo (Germany) Alexander Satschko
Mexico F14 Futures $10,000	October 10	Monterrey; Mexico	Hard	(Mexico) Bruno Echagaray	(United States) Zach Dailey (United States) Troy Hahn
Mexico F15 Futures $10,000	October 17	Ciudad Obregón; Mexico	Hard	(Brazil) Rodrigo-Antonio Grilli	(United States) Jonathan Chu (United States) Alberto Francis
USA F26 Futures $15,000	October 17	Arlington, Texas; USA	Hard	(United States) Michael Russell	(United States) Kelly Jones (United States) Pete Stroer
Nigeria F6 Futures $15,000	October 17	Lagos; Nigeria	Hard	(Togo) Komlavi Loglo	(Togo) Komlavi Loglo (Ivory Coast) Valentin Sanon
Czech Rep. F4 Futures $10,000	October 17	Průhonice; Czech Republic	Hard (i)	(Austria) Max Raditschnigg	(Czech Republic) Daniel Lustig (Slovakia) Filip Polášek
Zimbabwe F1 Futures $10,000	October 17	Bulawayo; Zimbabwe	Hard	(South Africa) Izak van der Merwe	(United States) Nicholas Monroe (South Africa) Izak van der Merwe
Chile F4 Futures $10,000	October 17	Santiago; Chile	Clay	(Argentina) Máximo González	(Argentina) Alejandro Fabbri (Uruguay) Martín Vilarrubí
Italy F35 Futures $10,000	October 17	Lecce; Italy	Clay	(France) Éric Prodon	(Italy) Leonardo Azzaro (Italy) Giancarlo Petrazzuolo
France F18 Futures $15,000	October 17	La Roche-sur-Yon; France	Hard (i)	(France) Olivier Vandewiele	(France) Julien Jeanpierre (France) Nicolas Renavand
Spain F29 Futures $10,000	October 17	Barcelona; Spain	Clay	(France) Stéphane Robert	(Spain) Antonio Baldellou-Esteva (Spain) Germán Puentes
Spain F30 Futures $10,000	October 24	Sant Cugat; Spain	Clay	(Spain) Gorka Fraile	(Argentina) Diego Álvarez (Argentina) Guillermo Carry
France F19 Futures $10,000	October 24	Rodez; France	Hard (i)	(France) Mathieu Montcourt	(France) Xavier Audouy (France) Jean-François Bachelot
South Africa F1 Futures $10,000	October 24	Pretoria; South Africa	Hard	(United States) Nicholas Monroe	(South Africa) Andrew Anderson (South Africa) Stephen Mitchell
Czech Rep. F5 Futures $10,000	October 24	Opava; Czech Republic	Hard (i)	(Czech Republic) Jan Vacek	(Czech Republic) Daniel Lustig (Slovakia) Filip Polášek
USA F27 Futures $15,000	October 24	Waco, Texas; USA	Hard	(Germany) Benjamin Becker	(Germany) Benjamin Becker (United States) Jason Marshall
Mexico F16 Futures $10,000	October 24	Mazatlán; Mexico	Hard	(Mexico) Bruno Echagaray	(United Kingdom) Richard Irwin (Poland) Dawid Olejniczak
Mexico F17 Futures $10,000	October 31	León, Guanajuato; Mexico	Hard	(Mexico) Víctor Romero	(Mexico) Daniel Garza (Colombia) Michael Quintero
Canada F1 Futures $10,000	October 31	Toronto; Canada	Hard (i)	(United States) Matthew Behrmann	(Germany) Benjamin Becker (United States) Phil Stolt
Czech Rep. F6 Futures $10,000	October 31	Frýdlant nad Ostravicí; Czech Republic	Hard (i)	(Czech Republic) Jan Hájek	(Czech Republic) Daniel Lustig (Slovakia) Filip Polášek
South Africa F2 Futures $10,000	October 31	Pretoria; South Africa	Hard	(South Africa) Andrew Anderson	(South Africa) Andrew Anderson (South Africa) Stephen Mitchell
Chile F5 Futures $10,000	October 31	Santiago; Chile	Clay	(Chile) Guillermo Hormazábal	(Argentina) Patricio Rudi (Argentina) Emiliano Redondi
Spain F31 Futures $10,000	October 31	Vilafranca; Spain	Clay	(Spain) Pablo Andújar	(Argentina) Diego Álvarez (Argentina) Guillermo Carry
Belgium F1 Futures $15,000	October 31	Sint-Katelijne-Waver; Belgium	Hard (i)	(United Kingdom) Richard Bloomfield	(Russia) Kirill Ivanov-Smolensky (Russia) Denis Matsukevich

=== November ===
Tournament	Date	City	Surface	Singles champions	Doubles champions
Belgium F2 Futures $15,000	November 7	Waterloo; Belgium	Carpet (i)	(Switzerland) Stéphane Bohli	(Belgium) Maxime Authom (Belgium) Frederic De Fays
Chile F6 Futures $10,000	November 7	Santiago; Chile	Clay	(Argentina) Leonardo Mayer	(Chile) Luis Hormazábal (Chile) Guillermo Hormazábal
China F6 Futures $15,000	November 7	Jiangmen; China P.R.	Hard	(South Korea) Im Kyu-tae	(Austria) Alexander Peya (Germany) Lars Uebel
Australia F9 Futures $15,000	November 7	Aberfoyle Park, South Australia; Australia	Hard	(Australia) Marc Kimmich	(Australia) Carsten Ball (Australia) Andrew Coelho
Venezuela F7 Futures $15,000	November 7	Maracay; Venezuela	Hard	(Venezuela) Jhonnatan Medina-Álvarez	(Argentina) Brian Dabul (Uruguay) Marcel Felder
Canada F2 Futures $10,000	November 7	Rimouski; Canada	Hard (i)	(Germany) Benjamin Becker	(United Kingdom) Ross Hutchins (United Kingdom) Jamie Murray
Mexico F18 Futures $10,000	November 7	Querétaro; Mexico	Hard	(Brazil) Rodrigo-Antonio Grilli	(Sweden) Mikael Ekman (Sweden) Carl-Henrik Hansen
USA F28 Futures $15,000	November 7	Waikoloa, Hawaii; USA	Hard	(United States) Wayne Odesnik	(United States) Scott Lipsky (United States) David Martin
USA F29 Futures $15,000	November 14	Honolulu; USA	Hard	(United States) Wayne Odesnik	(Italy) Marco Crugnola (Italy) Stefano Ianni
Canada F3 Futures $10,000	November 14	Montreal; Canada	Hard (i)	(Germany) Benjamin Becker	(Canada) Clay Donato (Canada) Jesse Levine
Venezuela F8 Futures $15,000	November 14	Maracay; Venezuela	Hard	(Uruguay) Pablo Cuevas	(Argentina) Brian Dabul (Uruguay) Marcel Felder
Chile F7 Futures $10,000	November 14	Antofagasta; Chile	Clay	(Argentina) Leandro Migani	(Chile) Luis Hormazábal (Chile) Guillermo Hormazábal
Australia F10 Futures $15,000	November 14	Berri; Australia	Grass	(Australia) Luke Bourgeois	(Australia) Carsten Ball (Australia) Andrew Coelho
China F7 Futures $15,000	November 14	Jiangmen; China P.R.	Hard	(Germany) Lars Uebel	(Austria) Alexander Peya (Germany) Lars Uebel
Spain F32 Futures $15,000	November 14	Gran Canaria; Spain	Hard	(Slovakia) Ivo Klec	(Spain) Marcel Granollers (Spain) David Marrero
Tunisia F4 Futures $10,000	November 14	Sfax; Tunisia	Hard	(Germany) Tony Holzinger	(Slovenia) Rok Jarc (Slovenia) Blaž Kavčič
Tunisia F5 Futures $10,000	November 21	Monastir; Tunisia	Hard	(Germany) Tony Holzinger	(Russia) Mikhail Elgin (Russia) Denis Matsukevich
Spain F33 Futures $15,000	November 21	Gran Canaria; Spain	Clay	(Portugal) Rui Machado	(Spain) David de Miguel (Portugal) Rui Machado
Australia F11 Futures $15,000	November 21	Barmera; Australia	Grass	(Romania) Horia Tecău	(Australia) Sam Groth (Australia) Joseph Sirianni
Israel F1 Futures $10,000	November 21	Ashkelon; Israel	Hard	(Netherlands) Robin Haase	(Czech Republic) Roman Vögeli (Czech Republic) Michal Navrátil
Israel F2 Futures $10,000	November 28	Ramat HaSharon; Israel	Hard	(North Macedonia) Lazar Magdinčev	(Israel) Victor Kolik (Israel) Dudi Sela
Spain F34 Futures $10,000	November 28	Pontevedra; Spain	Clay	(Spain) Gorka Fraile	(Spain) Antonio Baldellou-Esteva (Spain) Jordi Marse-Vidri
Tunisia F6 Futures $10,000	November 28	Menzah; Tunisia	Hard	(Uzbekistan) Farrukh Dustov	(Kuwait) Mohammad Ghareeb (Tunisia) Walid Jallali
Sri Lanka F2 Futures $10,000	November 28	Colombo; Sri Lanka	Clay	(Japan) Go Soeda	(India) Ravishankar Pathanjali (India) Vinod Sridhar

=== December ===
Tournament	Date	City	Surface	Singles champions	Doubles champions
India F7 Futures $10,000	December 5	Chandigarh; India	Hard	(Pakistan) Aisam-ul-Haq Qureshi	(Hong Kong) Karan Rastogi (India) Ashutosh Singh
Israel F3 Futures $10,000	December 5	Ra'anana; Israel	Hard	(Germany) Sebastian Rieschick	(United States) Nicholas Monroe (United States) Sam Warburg
India F8 Futures $10,000	December 12	Delhi; India	Hard	(India) Sanam Singh	(India) Ravishankar Pathanjali (India) Vinod Sridhar
