= 2005 Davis Cup Europe/Africa Zone Group III – Zone B =

International tennis competition

The Europe/Africa Zone was one of the three zones of the regional Davis Cup competition in 2005.

In the Europe/Africa Zone there were four different tiers, called groups, in which teams competed against each other to advance to the upper tier. Group III was split into two tournaments. One tournament was held in Smash Tennis Academy, Cairo, Egypt, April 27–May 1, on outdoor clay courts, while the other was held in Fitzwilliam Lawn Tennis Club, Dublin, Ireland, July 13–17, on outdoor grass courts.

== Format ==
The eight teams in the Dublin tournament were split into two pools and played in a round-robin format. The top two teams of each pool advanced to the promotion pool, from which the two top teams were promoted to the Europe/Africa Zone Group II in 2006. The bottom two teams of each group were placed in the relegation pool, from which the two bottom teams were demoted to the Europe/Africa Zone Group IV in 2006.

== Pool A ==
| | Pool A | IRL | ARM | NGR | ISL |
| 1 | Ireland (3–0) | | 3–0 | 3–0 | 3–0 |
| 2 | Armenia (2–1) | 0–3 | | 2–1 | 2–1 |
| 3 | Nigeria (1–2) | 0–3 | 1–2 | | 3–0 |
| 4 | Iceland (0–3) | 0–3 | 1–2 | 0–3 | |

=== Ireland vs. Nigeria ===
Ireland
3
Fitzwilliam Lawn Tennis Club, Dublin, Ireland
13 July 2005
Grass

Nigeria
0

| | | | 1 | 2 | 3 |
|---|---|---|---|---|---|
| 1 | (Republic of Ireland) (Nigeria) | Louk Sorensen; Abdul-Mumin Babalola | 6; 0 | 6; 1 |
| 2 | (Republic of Ireland) (Nigeria) | Kevin Sorensen; Jonathan Igbinovia | 6; 3 | 6; 3 |
| 3 | (Republic of Ireland) (Nigeria) | Conor Niland / David O'Connell; Jonathan Igbinovia / Damisa Robinson | 6; 2 | 6; 4 |

=== Armenia vs. Iceland ===
Armenia
2
Fitzwilliam Lawn Tennis Club, Dublin, Ireland
13 July 2005
Grass

Iceland
1

| | | | 1 | 2 | 3 |
|---|---|---|---|---|---|
| 1 | (Armenia) (Iceland) | Harutyun Sofyan; Andri Jonsson | 6; 2 | 6; 4 |
| 2 | (Armenia) (Iceland) | Sargis Sargsian; Arnar Sigurðsson | 5; 7 | 6; 0 | 3; 6 |
| 3 | (Armenia) (Iceland) | Sargis Sargsian / Harutyun Sofyan; Raj-Kumar Bonifacius / Arnar Sigurðsson | 6; 1 | 6; 4 |

=== Ireland vs. Armenia ===
Ireland
3
Fitzwilliam Lawn Tennis Club, Dublin, Ireland
14 July 2005
Grass

Armenia
0

| | | | 1 | 2 | 3 |
|---|---|---|---|---|---|
| 1 | (Republic of Ireland) (Armenia) | Louk Sorensen; Harutyun Sofyan | 6; 3 | 6; 1 |
| 2 | (Republic of Ireland) (Armenia) | Kevin Sorensen; Sargis Sargsian | 6; 3 | 6; 3 |
| 3 | (Republic of Ireland) (Armenia) | Conor Niland / David O'Connell; Sargis Sargsian / Harutyun Sofyan | 7; 5 | 1; 6 | 7; 5 |

=== Iceland vs. Nigeria ===
Iceland
0
Fitzwilliam Lawn Tennis Club, Dublin, Ireland
14 July 2005
Grass

Nigeria
3

| | | | 1 | 2 | 3 |
|---|---|---|---|---|---|
| 1 | (Iceland) (Nigeria) | Andri Jonsson; Abdul-Mumin Babalola | 2; 6 | 0; 6 |
| 2 | (Iceland) (Nigeria) | Arnar Sigurðsson; Jonathan Igbinovia | 6^{6} 7^{8} | 2; 6 |
| 3 | (Iceland) (Nigeria) | Andri Jonsson / Arnar Sigurðsson; Abdul-Mumin Babalola / Lawal Shehu | 5; 7 | 6^{7} 7^{9} |

=== Ireland vs. Iceland ===
Ireland
3
Fitzwilliam Lawn Tennis Club, Dublin, Ireland
15 July 2005
Grass

Iceland
0

| | | | 1 | 2 | 3 |
|---|---|---|---|---|---|
| 1 | (Republic of Ireland) (Iceland) | Conor Niland; Andri Jonsson | 6; 0 | 6; 0 |
| 2 | (Republic of Ireland) (Iceland) | Kevin Sorensen; Raj-Kumar Bonifacius | 6; 2 | 6; 1 |
| 3 | (Republic of Ireland) (Iceland) | Conor Niland / David O'Connell; Davíð Halldórsson / Andri Jonsson | 6; 2 | 6; 0 |

=== Armenia vs. Nigeria ===
Armenia
2
Fitzwilliam Lawn Tennis Club, Dublin, Ireland
15 July 2005
Grass

Nigeria
1

| | | | 1 | 2 | 3 |
|---|---|---|---|---|---|
| 1 | (Armenia) (Nigeria) | Harutyun Sofyan; Abdul-Mumin Babalola | 7; 5 | 1; 6 | 4; 6 |
| 2 | (Armenia) (Nigeria) | Sargis Sargsian; Jonathan Igbinovia | 6; 2 | 7^{9} 6^{7} |
| 3 | (Armenia) (Nigeria) | Sargis Sargsian / Harutyun Sofyan; Jonathan Igbinovia / Damisa Robinson | 6; 3 | 6; 3 |

== Pool B ==
| | Pool B | CYP | TUN | TUR | SMR |
| 1 | Cyprus (3–0) | | 3–0 | 2–1 | 3–0 |
| 2 | Tunisia (2–1) | 0–3 | | 2–1 | 3–0 |
| 3 | Turkey (1–2) | 1–2 | 1–2 | | 3–0 |
| 4 | San Marino (0–3) | 0–3 | 0–3 | 0–3 | |

=== Tunisia vs. San Marino ===
Tunisia
3
Fitzwilliam Lawn Tennis Club, Dublin, Ireland
13 July 2005
Grass

San Marino
0

| | | | 1 | 2 | 3 |
|---|---|---|---|---|---|
| 1 | (Tunisia) (San Marino) | Haythem Abid; Domenico Vicini | 6^{6} 7^{8} | 7; 5 | 6; 2 |
| 2 | (Tunisia) (San Marino) | Malek Jaziri; Diego Zonzini | 6; 0 | 6; 3 |
| 3 | (Tunisia) (San Marino) | Haythem Abid / Malek Jaziri; William Forcellini / Christian Rosti | 6; 0 | 7; 5 |

=== Cyprus vs. Turkey ===
Cyprus
2
Fitzwilliam Lawn Tennis Club, Dublin, Ireland
13 July 2005
Grass

Turkey
1

| | | | 1 | 2 | 3 |
|---|---|---|---|---|---|
| 1 | (Cyprus) (Turkey) | Photos Kallias; Barış Ergüden | 7^{9} 6^{7} | 6; 1 |
| 2 | (Cyprus) (Turkey) | Marcos Baghdatis; Haluk Akkoyun | 6; 3 | 6; 1 |
| 3 | (Cyprus) (Turkey) | Photos Kallias / Demetrios Leontis; Haluk Akkoyun / Esat Tanık | 4; 6 | 7; 5 | 3; 6 |

=== Tunisia vs. Cyprus ===
Tunisia
0
Fitzwilliam Lawn Tennis Club, Dublin, Ireland
14 July 2005
Grass

Cyprus
3

| | | | 1 | 2 | 3 |
|---|---|---|---|---|---|
| 1 | (Tunisia) (Cyprus) | Haythem Abid; Photos Kallias | 4; 6 | 1; 6 |
| 2 | (Tunisia) (Cyprus) | Malek Jaziri; Marcos Baghdatis | 1; 6 | 3; 6 |
| 3 | (Tunisia) (Cyprus) | Wael Kilani / Fares Zaier; Marcos Baghdatis / Demetrios Leontis | 6^{5} 7^{7} | 3; 6 |

=== Turkey vs. San Marino ===
Turkey
3
Fitzwilliam Lawn Tennis Club, Dublin, Ireland
14 July 2005
Grass

San Marino
0

| | | | 1 | 2 | 3 |
|---|---|---|---|---|---|
| 1 | (Turkey) (San Marino) | Barış Ergüden; Domenico Vicini | 7^{7} 6^{3} | 6; 4 |
| 2 | (Turkey) (San Marino) | Haluk Akkoyun; William Forcellini | 6; 3 | 6; 2 |
| 3 | (Turkey) (San Marino) | Haluk Akkoyun / Esat Tanık; William Forcellini / Christian Rosti | 7^{7} 6^{4} | 6; 2 |

=== Tunisia vs. Turkey ===
Tunisia
2
Fitzwilliam Lawn Tennis Club, Dublin, Ireland
15 July 2005
Grass

Turkey
1

| | | | 1 | 2 | 3 |
|---|---|---|---|---|---|
| 1 | (Tunisia) (Turkey) | Haythem Abid; Esat Tanık | 6; 2 | 6; 3 |
| 2 | (Tunisia) (Turkey) | Malek Jaziri; Haluk Akkoyun | 3; 6 | 4; 6 |
| 3 | (Tunisia) (Turkey) | Haythem Abid / Malek Jaziri; Haluk Akkoyun / Barış Ergüden | 6; 4 | 3; 6 | 6; 1 |

=== Cyprus vs. San Marino ===
Cyprus
3
Fitzwilliam Lawn Tennis Club, Dublin, Ireland
15 July 2005
Grass

San Marino
0

| | | | 1 | 2 | 3 |
|---|---|---|---|---|---|
| 1 | (Cyprus) (San Marino) | Christopher Koutrouzas; Christian Rosti | 6; 3 | 6; 4 |
| 2 | (Cyprus) (San Marino) | Photos Kallias; Diego Zonzini | 6; 0 | 6; 0 |
| 3 | (Cyprus) (San Marino) | Marcos Baghdatis / Demetrios Leontis; William Forcellini / Diego Zonzini | 6; 1 | 6; 1 |

== Promotion pool ==
The top two teams from each of Pools A and B advanced to the Promotion pool. Results and points from games against the opponent from the preliminary round were carried forward.

(scores in italics carried over from Groups)

| | 1st–4th Play-off | CYP | IRL | ARM | TUN |
| 1 | Cyprus (3–0) | | 2–1 | 2–1 | 3–0 |
| 2 | Ireland (2–1) | 1–2 | | 3–0 | 3–0 |
| 3 | Armenia (1–2) | 1–2 | 0–3 | | 2–1 |
| 4 | Tunisia (0–3) | 0–3 | 0–3 | 1–2 | |

Cyprus and Ireland promoted to Group II in 2006.

=== Ireland vs. Cyprus ===
Ireland
1
Fitzwilliam Lawn Tennis Club, Dublin, Ireland
16 July 2005
Grass

Cyprus
2

| | | | 1 | 2 | 3 |
|---|---|---|---|---|---|
| 1 | (Republic of Ireland) (Cyprus) | Conor Niland; Photos Kallias | 6; 4 | 3; 6 | 6; 0 |
| 2 | (Republic of Ireland) (Cyprus) | Kevin Sorensen; Marcos Baghdatis | 2; 6 | 6; 4 | 0; 6 |
| 3 | (Republic of Ireland) (Cyprus) | Conor Niland / David O'Connell; Marcos Baghdatis / Demetrios Leontis | 6; 4 | 0; 6 | 1; 6 |

=== Armenia vs. Tunisia ===
Armenia
2
Fitzwilliam Lawn Tennis Club, Dublin, Ireland
16 July 2005
Grass

Tunisia
1

| | | | 1 | 2 | 3 |
|---|---|---|---|---|---|
| 1 | (Armenia) (Tunisia) | Harutyun Sofyan; Haythem Abid | 6^{3} 7^{7} | 5; 7 |
| 2 | (Armenia) (Tunisia) | Sargis Sargsian; Malek Jaziri | 6; 4 | 6; 1 |
| 3 | (Armenia) (Tunisia) | Sargis Sargsian / Harutyun Sofyan; Malek Jaziri / Wael Kilani | 6; 4 | 6; 3 |

=== Ireland vs. Tunisia ===
Ireland
3
Fitzwilliam Lawn Tennis Club, Dublin, Ireland
17 July 2005
Grass

Tunisia
0

| | | | 1 | 2 | 3 |
|---|---|---|---|---|---|
| 1 | (Republic of Ireland) (Tunisia) | Louk Sorensen; Wael Kilani | 6; 1 | 6; 2 |
| 2 | (Republic of Ireland) (Tunisia) | Kevin Sorensen; Malek Jaziri | 6; 2 | 7; 5 |
| 3 | (Republic of Ireland) (Tunisia) | David O'Connell / Kevin Sorensen; Wael Kilani / Fares Zaier | 6; 2 | 5; 7 | 6; 2 |

=== Armenia vs. Cyprus ===
Armenia
1
Fitzwilliam Lawn Tennis Club, Dublin, Ireland
17 July 2005
Grass

Cyprus
2

| | | | 1 | 2 | 3 |
|---|---|---|---|---|---|
| 1 | (Armenia) (Cyprus) | Harutyun Sofyan; Photos Kallias | 0; 6 | 1; 6 |
| 2 | (Armenia) (Cyprus) | Hayk Zohranyan; Marcos Baghdatis | 3; 6 | 1; 6 |
| 3 | (Armenia) (Cyprus) | Harutyun Sofyan / Hayk Zohranyan; Christopher Koutrouzas / Demetrios Leontis | 7^{7} 6^{4} | 6; 2 |

== Relegation pool ==
The bottom two teams from Pools A and B were placed in the relegation group. Results and points from games against the opponent from the preliminary round were carried forward.

(scores in italics carried over from Groups)

| | 5th–8th Play-off | NGR | TUR | ISL | SMR |
| 1 | Nigeria (3–0) | | 2–1 | 3–0 | 3–0 |
| 2 | Turkey (2–1) | 1–2 | | 2–1 | 3–0 |
| 3 | Iceland (1–2) | 0–3 | 1–2 | | 2–1 |
| 4 | San Marino (0–3) | 0–3 | 0–3 | 1–2 | |

Iceland and San Marino relegated to Group IV in 2006.

=== Nigeria vs. Turkey ===
Nigeria
2
Fitzwilliam Lawn Tennis Club, Dublin, Ireland
16 July 2005
Grass

Turkey
1

| | | | 1 | 2 | 3 |
|---|---|---|---|---|---|
| 1 | (Nigeria) (Turkey) | Abdul-Mumin Babalola; Barış Ergüden | 6; 4 | 6; 2 |
| 2 | (Nigeria) (Turkey) | Jonathan Igbinovia; Haluk Akkoyun | 6^{5} 7^{7} | 6; 1 | 4; 6 |
| 3 | (Nigeria) (Turkey) | Abdul-Mumin Babalola / Lawal Shehu; Haluk Akkoyun / Esat Tanık | 6; 4 | 6; 4 |

=== Iceland vs. San Marino ===
Iceland
2
Fitzwilliam Lawn Tennis Club, Dublin, Ireland
16 July 2005
Grass

San Marino
1

| | | | 1 | 2 | 3 |
|---|---|---|---|---|---|
| 1 | (Iceland) (San Marino) | Raj-Kumar Bonifacius; Domenico Vicini | 3; 6 | 6^{5} 7^{7} |
| 2 | (Iceland) (San Marino) | Arnar Sigurðsson; William Forcellini | 6; 1 | 6; 0 |
| 3 | (Iceland) (San Marino) | Andri Jonsson / Arnar Sigurðsson; Christian Rosti / Domenico Vicini | 6; 3 | 7; 5 |

=== Nigeria vs. San Marino ===
Nigeria
3
Fitzwilliam Lawn Tennis Club, Dublin, Ireland
17 July 2005
Grass

San Marino
0

| | | | 1 | 2 | 3 |
|---|---|---|---|---|---|
| 1 | (Nigeria) (San Marino) | Abdul-Mumin Babalola; William Forcellini | 6; 1 | 6; 2 |
| 2 | (Nigeria) (San Marino) | Jonathan Igbinovia; Diego Zonzini | 6; 1 | 6; 1 |
| 3 | (Nigeria) (San Marino) | Abdul-Mumin Babalola / Lawal Shehu; Domenico Vicini / Diego Zonzini | 7^{8} 6^{6} | 7; 5 |

=== Iceland vs. Turkey ===
Iceland
1
Fitzwilliam Lawn Tennis Club, Dublin, Ireland
17 July 2005
Grass

Turkey
2

| | | | 1 | 2 | 3 |
|---|---|---|---|---|---|
| 1 | (Iceland) (Turkey) | Raj-Kumar Bonifacius; Barış Ergüden | 4; 6 | 6^{3} 7^{7} |
| 2 | (Iceland) (Turkey) | Arnar Sigurðsson; Haluk Akkoyun | 6; 2 | 7^{7} 6^{2} |
| 3 | (Iceland) (Turkey) | Andri Jonsson / Arnar Sigurðsson; Haluk Akkoyun / Barış Ergüden | 2; 6 | 6^{4} 7^{7} |

== Final standings ==
| Rank | Team |
|---|---|
| 1 | Cyprus |
| 2 | Ireland |
| 3 | Armenia |
| 4 | Tunisia |
| 5 | Nigeria |
| 6 | Turkey |
| 7 | Iceland |
| 8 | San Marino |

- Cyprus and Ireland promoted to Group II in 2006.
- Iceland and San Marino relegated to Group IV in 2006.
