= 2004 Davis Cup Europe/Africa Zone Group IV – Zone A =

International tennis competition

The Europe/Africa Zone was one of the three zones of the regional Davis Cup competition in 2004.

In the Europe/Africa Zone there were four different tiers, called groups, in which teams competed against each other to advance to the upper tier. Group IV was split into two tournaments. One tournament was held in Olympique Club de Dakar, Dakar, Senegal, February 4–8, on outdoor hard courts, while the other was held in Tennis Club Ali-Ten, Chișinău, Moldova, July 15–18, on outdoor clay courts.

== Format ==
The five teams in the Dakar tournament played in a round-robin format. The top two teams were promoted to the Europe/Africa Zone Group III in 2005.

== Draw ==
- Venue: Olympique Club de Dakar, Dakar, Senegal (hard)
- Date: 4–8 February

		NGR	SMR	SEN	MLI	GAB
1	Nigeria (4–0)		3–0	3–0	3–0	3–0
2	San Marino (3–1)	0–3		3–0	3–0	3–0
3	Senegal (2–2)	0–3	0–3		2–1	3–0
4	Mali (1–3)	0–3	0–3	1–2		3–0
5	Gabon (0–4)	0–3	0–3	0–3	0–3	

- Nigeria and San Marino promoted to Group III in 2005.

== Results ==
=== Nigeria vs. Mali ===
Nigeria
3
Olympique Club de Dakar, Dakar, Senegal
4 February 2004
Hard

Mali
0

			1	2	3
1	(Nigeria) (Mali)	Abdul-Mumin Babalola; Madou Keita	6; 3	6; 0
2	(Nigeria) (Mali)	Jonathan Igbinovia; Mohamoud Diallo	6; 3	6; 4
3	(Nigeria) (Mali)	Jonathan Igbinovia / Sunday Maku; Amadou Diallo / Madou Keita	6; 2	6; 3

=== Senegal vs. San Marino ===
Senegal
0
Olympique Club de Dakar, Dakar, Senegal
4 February 2004
Hard

San Marino
3

			1	2	3
1	(Senegal) (San Marino)	Diadji Ka; Christian Rosti	4; 6	1; 6
2	(Senegal) (San Marino)	Daouda Ndiaye; Domenico Vicini	3; 6	2; 6
3	(Senegal) (San Marino)	Daouda Ndiaye / Mamadou Seye; William Forcellini / Domenico Vicini	4; 6	4; 6

=== Nigeria vs. Gabon ===
Nigeria
3
Olympique Club de Dakar, Dakar, Senegal
5 February 2004
Hard

Gabon
0

			1	2	3
1	(Nigeria) (Gabon)	Abdul-Mumin Babalola; Yvan-Johan Mefane	6; 0	6; 2
2	(Nigeria) (Gabon)	Jonathan Igbinovia; Brice Pendi	6; 0	6; 0
3	(Nigeria) (Gabon)	Jonathan Igbinovia / Sunday Maku; Fabrice Mefane / Brice Pendi	6; 1	6; 0

=== Mali vs. Senegal ===
Mali
1
Olympique Club de Dakar, Dakar, Senegal
5 February 2004
Hard

Senegal
2

			1	2	3
1	(Mali) (Senegal)	Amadou Diallo; Diadji Ka	5; 7	3; 6
2	(Mali) (Senegal)	Madou Keita; Daouda Ndiaye	3; 6	6; 4	6; 4
3	(Mali) (Senegal)	Mohamoud Diallo / Madou Keita; Youssou Berthé / Mamadou Seye	1; 6	6; 3	3; 6

=== Nigeria vs. San Marino ===
Nigeria
3
Olympique Club de Dakar, Dakar, Senegal
6 February 2004
Hard

San Marino
0

			1	2	3
1	(Nigeria) (San Marino)	Abdul-Mumin Babalola; Domenico Vicini	7^{7} 6^{3}	6; 1
2	(Nigeria) (San Marino)	Jonathan Igbinovia; William Forcellini	6; 2	6; 3
3	(Nigeria) (San Marino)	Jonathan Igbinovia / Sunday Maku; William Forcellini / Diego Zonzini	6; 0	6; 4

=== Mali vs. Gabon ===
Mali
3
Olympique Club de Dakar, Dakar, Senegal
6 February 2004
Hard

Gabon
0

			1	2	3
1	(Mali) (Gabon)	Madou Keita; Yvan-Johan Mefane	6; 3	6; 4
2	(Mali) (Gabon)	Mohamoud Diallo; Brice Pendi	4; 6	6; 1	6; 2
3	(Mali) (Gabon)	Amadou Diallo / Madou Keita; Fabrice Mefane / Yvan-Johan Mefane	6; 1	6; 1

=== Mali vs. San Marino ===
Mali
0
Olympique Club de Dakar, Dakar, Senegal
7 February 2004
Hard

San Marino
3

			1	2	3
1	(Mali) (San Marino)	Madou Keita; Christian Rosti	4; 6	2; 6
2	(Mali) (San Marino)	Mohamoud Diallo; Domenico Vicini	6^{1} 7^{7}	6^{6} 7^{8}
3	(Mali) (San Marino)	Amadou Diallo / Madou Keita; William Forcellini / Christian Rosti	4; 6	2; 6

=== Gabon vs. Senegal ===
Gabon
0
Olympique Club de Dakar, Dakar, Senegal
7 February 2004
Hard

Senegal
3

			1	2	3
1	(Gabon) (Senegal)	Fabrice Mefane; Youssou Berthé	3; 6	2; 6
2	(Gabon) (Senegal)	Brice Pendi; Diadji Ka	4; 6	2; 6
3	(Gabon) (Senegal)	Fabrice Mefane / Yvan-Johan Mefane; Youssou Berthé / Mamadou Seye	2; 6	2; 6

=== Nigeria vs. Senegal ===
Nigeria
3
Olympique Club de Dakar, Dakar, Senegal
8 February 2004
Hard

Senegal
0

			1	2	3
1	(Nigeria) (Senegal)	Abdul-Mumin Babalola; Youssou Berthé	6; 0	6; 3
2	(Nigeria) (Senegal)	Jonathan Igbinovia; Diadji Ka	6; 3	6; 1
3	(Nigeria) (Senegal)	Toyin Dairo / Sunday Maku; Daouda Ndiaye / Mamadou Seye	6; 3	6; 4

=== Gabon vs. San Marino ===
Gabon
0
Olympique Club de Dakar, Dakar, Senegal
8 February 2004
Hard

San Marino
3

			1	2	3
1	(Gabon) (San Marino)	Yvan-Johan Mefane; Christian Rosti	4; 6	1; 6
2	(Gabon) (San Marino)	Fabrice Mefane; Domenico Vicini	1; 6	5; 7
3	(Gabon) (San Marino)	Fabrice Mefane / Yvan-Johan Mefane; William Forcellini / Christian Rosti	2; 6	4; 6
