= 2002 Davis Cup Europe/Africa Zone Group IV – Zone B =

International tennis competition

The Europe/Africa Zone was one of the three zones of the regional Davis Cup competition in 2002.

In the Europe/Africa Zone there were four different tiers, called groups, in which teams competed against each other to advance to the upper tier. Group IV was split into two tournaments. One tournament was held in Mombasa Sports Club, Mombasa, Kenya, February 6–10, on outdoor hard courts, while the other was held in Centro Tennis Parco di Montecchio, San Marino, June 12–16, on outdoor clay courts.

== Format ==
The six teams in the San Marino tournament played in a round-robin format. The top two teams were promoted to the Europe/Africa Zone Group III in 2003.

== Draw ==
- Venue: Centro Tennis Parco di Montecchio, San Marino (outdoor clay)
- Date: 12–16 June

| | Zone B | GEO | AZE | SMR | NGR | LIE | UGA |
| 1 | Georgia (4–1) | | 2–1 | 3–0 | 1–2 | 2–1 | 3–0 |
| 2 | Azerbaijan (4–1) | 1–2 | | 2–1 | 2–1 | 2–1 | 2–1 |
| 3 | San Marino (3–2) | 0–3 | 1–2 | | 2–1 | 2–0 | 3–0 |
| 4 | Nigeria (3–2) | 2–1 | 1–2 | 1–2 | | 2–1 | 3–0 |
| 5 | Liechtenstein (1–4) | 1–2 | 1–2 | 0–2 | 1–2 | | 3–0 |
| 6 | Uganda (0–5) | 0–3 | 1–2 | 0–3 | 0–3 | 0–3 | |

- Georgia and Azerbaijan promoted to Group III in 2003.

== Results ==
=== Azerbaijan vs. Liechtenstein ===
Azerbaijan
2
Centro Tennis Parco di Montecchio, San Marino
12 June 2002
Clay

Liechtenstein
1

| | | | 1 | 2 | 3 |
|---|---|---|---|---|---|
| 1 | (Azerbaijan) (Liechtenstein) | Farid Shirinov; Stephan Ritter | 2; 6 | 1; 6 |
| 2 | (Azerbaijan) (Liechtenstein) | Emin Ağayev; Jürgen Tömördy | 6; 1 | 6; 2 |
| 3 | (Azerbaijan) (Liechtenstein) | Emin Ağayev / Farid Shirinov; Stephan Ritter / Herbert Weirather | 6; 3 | 4; 6 | 6; 4 |

=== Georgia vs. Uganda ===
Georgia
3
Centro Tennis Parco di Montecchio, San Marino
12 June 2002
Clay

Uganda
0

| | | | 1 | 2 | 3 |
|---|---|---|---|---|---|
| 1 | (Georgia (country)) (Uganda) | Vladimir Kakulia; Godfrey Uzunga | 6; 2 | 6; 3 |
| 2 | (Georgia (country)) (Uganda) | Irakli Ushangishvili; Charles Yokwe | 6; 1 | 6; 0 |
| 3 | (Georgia (country)) (Uganda) | Vladimir Gabrichidze / Irakli Ushangishvili; Godfrey Uzunga / Charles Yokwe | 6; 2 | 6; 3 |

=== Nigeria vs. San Marino ===
Nigeria
1
Centro Tennis Parco di Montecchio, San Marino
12 June 2002
Clay

San Marino
2

| | | | 1 | 2 | 3 |
|---|---|---|---|---|---|
| 1 | (Nigeria) (San Marino) | Abdul-Mumin Babalola; Massimiliano Rosti | 3; 6 | 3; 6 |
| 2 | (Nigeria) (San Marino) | Rotimi Jegede; Domenico Vicini | 1; 6 | 6; 3 | 1; 6 |
| 3 | (Nigeria) (San Marino) | Toyin Dairo / Sunday Maku; Christian Rosti / Domenico Vicini | 4; 6 | 7^{7} 6^{4} | 7; 5 |

=== Azerbaijan vs. Nigeria ===
Azerbaijan
2
Centro Tennis Parco di Montecchio, San Marino
13 June 2002
Clay

Nigeria
1

| | | | 1 | 2 | 3 |
|---|---|---|---|---|---|
| 1 | (Azerbaijan) (Nigeria) | Farid Shirinov; Rotimi Jegede | 5; 7 | 3; 6 |
| 2 | (Azerbaijan) (Nigeria) | Emin Ağayev; Sunday Maku | 6; 2 | 6; 1 |
| 3 | (Azerbaijan) (Nigeria) | Emin Ağayev / Farid Shirinov; Abdul-Mumin Babalola / Toyin Dairo | 6; 3 | 6; 4 |

=== Liechtenstein vs. Georgia ===
Liechtenstein
1
Centro Tennis Parco di Montecchio, San Marino
13 June 2002
Clay

Georgia
2

| | | | 1 | 2 | 3 |
|---|---|---|---|---|---|
| 1 | (Liechtenstein) (Georgia (country)) | Herbert Weirather; Vladimir Kakulia | 6; 3 | 5; 7 | 6; 4 |
| 2 | (Liechtenstein) (Georgia (country)) | Jürgen Tömördy; Irakli Ushangishvili | 2; 6 | 4; 6 |
| 3 | (Liechtenstein) (Georgia (country)) | Kenny Banzer / Stephan Ritter; Vladimir Gabrichidze / Irakli Ushangishvili | 0; 6 | 0; 6 |

=== Uganda vs. San Marino ===
Uganda
0
Centro Tennis Parco di Montecchio, San Marino
13 June 2002
Clay

San Marino
3

| | | | 1 | 2 | 3 |
|---|---|---|---|---|---|
| 1 | (Uganda) (San Marino) | Christopher Bagala; Massimiliano Rosti | 1; 6 | 1; 6 |
| 2 | (Uganda) (San Marino) | Godfrey Uzunga; Domenico Vicini | 2; 6 | 3; 6 |
| 3 | (Uganda) (San Marino) | Christopher Bagala / Godfrey Uzunga; William Forcellini / Christian Rosti | 2; 6 | 6; 3 | 2; 6 |

=== Azerbaijan vs. San Marino ===
Azerbaijan
2
Centro Tennis Parco di Montecchio, San Marino
14 June 2002
Clay

San Marino
1

| | | | 1 | 2 | 3 |
|---|---|---|---|---|---|
| 1 | (Azerbaijan) (San Marino) | Farid Shirinov; Massimiliano Rosti | 0; 6 | 0; 6 |
| 2 | (Azerbaijan) (San Marino) | Emin Ağayev; Domenico Vicini | 6; 0 | 6; 1 |
| 3 | (Azerbaijan) (San Marino) | Emin Ağayev / Farid Shirinov; Massimiliano Rosti / Domenico Vicini | 6; 3 | 6; 0 |

=== Liechtenstein vs. Uganda ===
Liechtenstein
3
Centro Tennis Parco di Montecchio, San Marino
14 June 2002
Clay

Uganda
0

| | | | 1 | 2 | 3 |
|---|---|---|---|---|---|
| 1 | (Liechtenstein) (Uganda) | Stephan Ritter; Patrick Olobo | 6; 2 | 6; 2 |
| 2 | (Liechtenstein) (Uganda) | Herbert Weirather; Christopher Bagala | 3; 6 | 6; 1 | 6; 3 |
| 3 | (Liechtenstein) (Uganda) | Kenny Banzer / Jürgen Tömördy; Christopher Bagala / Patrick Olobo | 6; 0 | 6; 2 |

=== Georgia vs. Nigeria ===
Georgia
1
Centro Tennis Parco di Montecchio, San Marino
14 June 2002
Clay

Nigeria
2

| | | | 1 | 2 | 3 |
|---|---|---|---|---|---|---|
| 1 | (Georgia (country)) (Nigeria) | Vladimir Gabrichidze; Rotimi Jegede | 5; 7 | 1; 3 | | retired |
| 2 | (Georgia (country)) (Nigeria) | Irakli Ushangishvili; Sunday Maku | 6; 2 | 6; 1 |
| 3 | (Georgia (country)) (Nigeria) | Vladimir Gabrichidze / Irakli Ushangishvili; Abdul-Mumin Babalola / Sunday Maku | 4; 6 | 6; 4 | 5; 7 |

=== Azerbaijan vs. Uganda ===
Azerbaijan
2
Centro Tennis Parco di Montecchio, San Marino
15 June 2002
Clay

Uganda
1

| | | | 1 | 2 | 3 |
|---|---|---|---|---|---|
| 1 | (Azerbaijan) (Uganda) | Farid Shirinov; Godfrey Uzunga | 7^{7} 6^{4} | 6; 3 |
| 2 | (Azerbaijan) (Uganda) | Emin Ağayev; Charles Yokwe | 6; 0 | 6; 2 |
| 3 | (Azerbaijan) (Uganda) | Talat Rahimov / Farid Shirinov; Godfrey Uzunga / Charles Yokwe | 6; 3 | 6^{4} 7^{7} | 5; 7 |

=== Liechtenstein vs. Nigeria ===
Liechtenstein
1
Centro Tennis Parco di Montecchio, San Marino
15 June 2002
Clay

Nigeria
2

| | | | 1 | 2 | 3 |
|---|---|---|---|---|---|
| 1 | (Liechtenstein) (Nigeria) | Stephan Ritter; Abdul-Mumin Babalola | 6; 4 | 6^{6} 7^{8} | 6; 4 |
| 2 | (Liechtenstein) (Nigeria) | Herbert Weirather; Rotimi Jegede | 3; 6 | 4; 6 |
| 3 | (Liechtenstein) (Nigeria) | Stephan Ritter / Jürgen Tömördy; Abdul-Mumin Babalola / Sunday Maku | 4; 6 | 1; 6 |

=== Georgia vs. San Marino ===
Georgia
3
Centro Tennis Parco di Montecchio, San Marino
15 June 2002
Clay

San Marino
0

| | | | 1 | 2 | 3 |
|---|---|---|---|---|---|
| 1 | (Georgia (country)) (San Marino) | Vladimir Kakulia; Massimiliano Rosti | 5; 7 | 6; 4 | 6; 2 |
| 2 | (Georgia (country)) (San Marino) | Irakli Ushangishvili; Domenico Vicini | 3; 6 | 6; 3 | 6; 4 |
| 3 | (Georgia (country)) (San Marino) | Vladimir Gabrichidze / Vladimir Kakulia; William Forcellini / Christian Rosti | 6; 2 | 6; 4 |

=== Azerbaijan vs. Georgia ===
Azerbaijan
1
Centro Tennis Parco di Montecchio, San Marino
16 June 2002
Clay

Georgia
2

| | | | 1 | 2 | 3 |
|---|---|---|---|---|---|
| 1 | (Azerbaijan) (Georgia (country)) | Talat Rahimov; Vladimir Kakulia | 4; 6 | 2; 6 |
| 2 | (Azerbaijan) (Georgia (country)) | Farid Shirinov; Irakli Ushangishvili | 3; 6 | 5; 7 |
| 3 | (Azerbaijan) (Georgia (country)) | Talat Rahimov / Farid Shirinov; Vladimir Kakulia / Irakli Ushangishvili | 6; 1 | 6; 3 |

=== Liechtenstein vs. San Marino ===
Liechtenstein
0
Centro Tennis Parco di Montecchio, San Marino
16 June 2002
Clay

San Marino
2

| | | | 1 | 2 | 3 |
|---|---|---|---|---|---|---|
| 1 | (Liechtenstein) (San Marino) | Stephan Ritter; Massimiliano Rosti | 6^{6} 7^{8} | 6^{1} 7^{7} |
| 2 | (Liechtenstein) (San Marino) | Jürgen Tömördy; Domenico Vicini | 6; 4 | 6^{3} 7^{7} | 3; 6 |
| 3 | (Liechtenstein) (San Marino) | Kenny Banzer / Jürgen Tömördy; William Forcellini / Christian Rosti | | | | not played |

=== Uganda vs. Nigeria ===
Uganda
0
Centro Tennis Parco di Montecchio, San Marino
16 June 2002
Clay

Nigeria
3

| | | | 1 | 2 | 3 |
|---|---|---|---|---|---|
| 1 | (Uganda) (Nigeria) | Godfrey Uzunga; Rotimi Jegede | 5; 7 | 1; 6 |
| 2 | (Uganda) (Nigeria) | Charles Yokwe; Sunday Maku | 2; 6 | 4; 6 |
| 3 | (Uganda) (Nigeria) | Christopher Bagala / Patrick Olobo; Rotimi Jegede / Sunday Maku | 1; 6 | 1; 6 |
