= Henry Adjei-Darko =

Ghanaian tennis player

- Country (sports): Ghana
- Residence: Atlanta, Georgia, U.S.
- Born: 28 February 1983 (age 43) Accra, Ghana
- Plays: Right-handed
- Prize money: $40,307

Singles
- Career record: 2–3
- Career titles: 0; 0 Challenger, 7 Futures
- Highest ranking: No. 275 (30 January 2006)

Grand Slam singles results
- Wimbledon: Q1 (2006)

Doubles
- Career record: 1–2
- Career titles: 0; 1 Challenger, 5 Futures, 2 Satellites
- Highest ranking: No. 358 (6 March 2006)

Team competitions
- Davis Cup: 23–16

Henry Adjei-Darko (born 28 February 1983), also known as Henry Darko, is a Ghanaian former professional tennis player.

== Biography ==
Adjei-Darko, who grew up in Accra, was a right-handed serve and volley player. As a junior he competed in grand slam events, including the 2001 US Open, where he made the quarter-finals of the doubles. He turned professional aged 20 and was based in Atlanta during his career.

Between 2001 and 2012, Adjei-Darko featured in a total of 25 Davis Cup ties for Ghana. Overall he won 23 matches, 17 of which came in singles.

Adjei-Darko played mostly in ITF Futures tournaments and reached a career high singles ranking of 275 in the world. At ITF level he won seven singles and five doubles titles.

While on the tour he also featured in the occasional Challenger event and was a semi-finalist at Orlando in 2005. His only Challenger title came in doubles, at Joplin in 2006.

Adjei-Darko took part in the qualifying draw for the 2006 Wimbledon Championships.

== Future and Challenger finals ==
=== Singles: 9 (7–2) ===
Legend (singles) ATP Challenger Tour (0–0) ITF Futures Tour (6–2)	Titles by surface Hard (6–2) Clay (0–0) Grass (0–0) Carpet (0–0)

Result	W–L	Date	Tournament	Tier	Surface	Opponent	Score
Win	1–0	Aug 2004	Nigeria F3A, Lagos	Futures	Hard	(South Africa) Roger Anderson	3–6, 6–2, 6–3
Win	2–0	Aug 2004	Nigeria F3B, Lagos	Futures	Hard	(Togo) Komlavi Loglo	6–1, 6–1
Loss	2–1	Jan 2005	United States F3, Key Biscayne	Futures	Hard	(Romania) Horia Tecău	3–6, 7–6^{(15–13)}, 3–6
Win	3–1	Apr 2005	Nigeria F1, Benin City	Futures	Hard	(Slovenia) Luka Gregorc	7–6^{(7–3)}, 6–3
Win	4–1	Aug 2005	Senegal F1, Dakar	Futures	Hard	(Qatar) Johar Mubarak Saeed	6–2, 6–1
Win	5–1	Aug 2005	Nigeria F3, Lagos	Futures	Hard	(Israel) Victor Kolik	6–3, 6–0
Loss	5–2	Aug 2005	Nigeria F4, Lagos	Futures	Hard	(Ivory Coast) Valentin Sanon	6–7^{(2–7)}, 3–6
Win	6–2	Oct 2005	Nigeria F5, Lagos	Futures	Hard	(Ivory Coast) Valentin Sanon	5–7, 6–4, 7–6^{(7–1)}
Win	7–2	Mar 2007	Nigeria F2, Benin City	Futures	Hard	(Togo) Komlavi Loglo	6–2, 3–6, 7–6^{(7–4)}

=== Doubles 16 (8–8) ===
Legend (doubles) ATP Challenger Tour (1–0) ITF Futures Tour (5–7) ITF Satellites (2–1)	Titles by surface Hard (6–7) Clay (1–1) Grass (0–0) Carpet (1–0)

Result	W–L	Date	Tournament	Tier	Surface	Partner	Opponents	Score
Loss	0–1	Nov 2000	South Africa, Pretoria	Satellites	Hard	(South Africa) Clinton Jacobs	(Togo) Komlavi Loglo (Benin) Arnaud Segodo	1–6, 3–6
Win	1–1	Nov 2000	South Africa, Pretoria	Satellites	Hard	(South Africa) Clinton Jacobs	(Ivory Coast) Charles Irie (Ivory Coast) Felix N'guetia	6–3, 3–6, 6–3
Loss	1–2	Jul 2004	Togo F1, Lomé	Futures	Hard	(Ivory Coast) Nouhoun Sangare	(Togo) Kwami Gakpo (Togo) Komlavi Loglo	6–4, 6–7^{(5–7)}, 4–6
Loss	1–3	Jul 2004	Nigeria F3A, Lagos	Futures	Hard	(Nigeria) Jonathan Igbinovia	(Netherlands) Romano Frantzen (Netherlands) Floris Kilian	3–6, 5–7
Win	2–3	Aug 2004	Nigeria F3B, Lagos	Futures	Hard	(Nigeria) Jonathan Igbinovia	(Netherlands) Romano Frantzen (Netherlands) Floris Kilian	6–7^{(10–12)}, 6–2, 6–4
Loss	2–4	Oct 2004	Nigeria F6A, Lagos	Futures	Hard	(Nigeria) Jonathan Igbinovia	(South Africa) Raven Klaasen (India) Sunil-Kumar Sipaeya	4–6, 6–7^{(4–7)}
Loss	2–5	Jan 2005	United States F3, Key Biscayne	Futures	Hard	(Nigeria) Jonathan Igbinovia	(United States) Nikita Kryvonos (United States) Denis Zivkovic	5–7, 5–7
Win	3–5	Feb 2005	Switzerland, Delémont	Satellites	Carpet (i)	(United Kingdom) Ross Hutchins	(Switzerland) Slobodan Mavrenski (Switzerland) Amar Zubcevic	6–2, 6–2
Win	4–5	Mar 2005	Great Britain F4, Bolton	Futures	Hard (i)	(Ivory Coast) Valentin Sanon	(Slovakia) Roman Kukal (Slovakia) Ján Stančík	5–7, 5–7
Win	5–5	May 2005	United States F9, Vero Beach	Futures	Clay	(Paraguay) Francisco Rodríguez	(United States) Anthony Lee (Nigeria) Damisa Robinson	6–3, 6–4
Loss	5–6	May 2005	United States F10, Orange Park	Futures	Clay	(Paraguay) Francisco Rodríguez	(United States) Nicholas Monroe (United States) Jeremy Wurtzman	6–3, 6–4
Win	6–6	Aug 2005	Nigeria F3, Lagos	Futures	Hard	(Ghana) Gunther Darkey	(Nigeria) Abdul-Mumin Babalola (Nigeria) Sunday Maku	3–6, 6–1, 6–4
Loss	6–7	Aug 2005	Nigeria F4, Lagos	Futures	Hard	(Ghana) Gunther Darkey	(Nigeria) Abdul-Mumin Babalola (Nigeria) Sunday Maku	4–6, 2–6
Win	7–7	Feb 2006	Joplin, United States	Challenger	Hard	(United States) Lesley Joseph	(Germany) Benjamin Becker (Germany) Simon Greul	6–3, 7–6^{(7–3)}
Win	8–7	May 2006	India F1, Delhi	Futures	Hard	(India) Sunil-Kumar Sipaeya	(India) Mustafa Ghouse (India) Kamala Kannan	7–6^{(7–5)}, 6–4
Loss	8–8	Nov 2006	United States F28, Waikoloa	Futures	Hard	(United States) Lesley Joseph	(Serbia and Montenegro) Alex Vlaški (South Africa) Fritz Wolmarans	6–7^{(6–8)}, 3–6
