= Arnaud Segodo =

Beninese tennis player

- Country (sports): Benin
- Born: 12 November 1984 (age 40); Cotonou, Benin
- Plays: Left-handed
- Prize money: $16,691

Singles
- Career record: 7–2 (Davis Cup)
- Highest ranking: No. 354 (2 Feb 2004)

Doubles
- Career record: 2–1 (Davis Cup)
- Highest ranking: No. 577 (5 Apr 2004)

Arnaud Segodo (born 12 November 1984) is a Beninese former professional tennis player.

Segodo, a left-hander from Cotonou, was coached in the sport by his father from an early age, before being sent by his federation to South Africa to train in the country's academies.

The African junior champion in 2000, Segodo was ranked as high as 30 in the world on the ITF Juniors tour.

Segodo played for the Benin Davis Cup team in 2001 and 2003, amassing seven singles wins. His best singles world ranking of 354 is the highest ever attained by a player from Benin.

== ITF Futures finals ==
=== Singles: 4 (2–2) ===
Result	W–L	Date	Tournament	Surface	Opponent	Score
Win	1–0	Feb 2003	Nigeria F1, Benin City	Hard	(Poland) Adam Chadaj	3–6, 6–4, 2–0 ret.
Win	2–0	Mar 2003	Nigeria F2, Benin City	Hard	(Nigeria) Jonathan Igbinovia	6–2, 6–2
Loss	2–1	Aug 2005	Senegal F1, Dakar	Hard	(Ghana) Henry Adjei-Darko	2–6, 1–6
Loss	2–2	Oct 2005	Nigeria F6, Lagos	Hard	(Togo) Komlavi Loglo	4–6, 6–3, 3–6

=== Doubles: 2 (2–0) ===
Result	W–L	Date	Tournament	Surface	Partner	Opponents	Score
Win	1–0	Sep 2001	Spain F10, Madrid	Hard	(Spain) Carles Reixach Itoiz	(Colombia) Pablo González (Spain) Ruben Merchan-Huecas	7–6^{(5)}, 6–4
Win	2–0	Mar 2004	Nigeria F2, Benin City	Hard	(France) Xavier Audouy	(Nigeria) Jonathan Igbinovia (Nigeria) Sunday Maku	7–6^{(5)}, 6–4
