= Lesley Joseph (tennis) =

American tennis player

- Country (sports): United States
- Born: September 14, 1981 (age 44) Rock Hill, South Carolina, U.S.
- Height: 5 ft 10 in (1.78 m)
- Prize money: $89,810

Singles
- Highest ranking: No. 243 (February 27, 2006)

Grand Slam singles results
- Australian Open: Q3 (2006)
- Wimbledon: Q1 (2006)
- US Open: Q1 (2004, 2006)

Doubles
- Highest ranking: No. 257 (July 31, 2006)

Lesley Joseph (born September 14, 1981) is an American former professional tennis player.

Born in Rock Hill, South Carolina, Joseph was the first African-American to play collegiate tennis for the University of Georgia, where he was a three-time All-SEC. He was a member of Georgia's 2001 NCAA Division I Championship winning team, with his contribution in the final a win at number three singles over Peter Handoyo.

Joseph reached a career high singles ranking of 243 in the world while competing on the professional tour. He made it through to the final qualifying round of the 2006 Australian Open and also featured in the qualifying draws for Wimbledon and the US Open. As a doubles player he had a best ranking of 257 and won two ATP Challenger titles.

== Challenger titles ==
=== Doubles: (2) ===
No.	Date	Tournament	Surface	Partner	Opponents	Score
1.	August 2005	Belo Horizonte, Brazil	Hard	(Serbia and Montenegro) Alex Vlaški	(Argentina) Juan Martín del Potro (Argentina) Máximo González	7–6^{(8)}, 6–4
2.	February 2006	Joplin, United States	Hard	(Ghana) Henry Adjei-Darko	(Germany) Benjamin Becker (Germany) Simon Greul	6–3, 7–6^{(3)}
