= Matthew Behrmann =

American tennis player

- Country (sports): United States
- Born: August 3, 1980 (age 44)
- Height: 5 ft 11 in (180 cm)
- Plays: Right-handed
- Prize money: $15,459

Singles
- Career record: 0–1
- Highest ranking: No. 536 (Nov 14, 2005)

Doubles
- Highest ranking: No. 676 (Nov 22, 2004)

Matthew Behrmann (born August 3, 1980) is an American former professional tennis player.

Behrmann grew up in Indianapolis and played collegiate tennis at the University of Florida. His only ATP Tour main draw appearance came as a qualifier at the 2003 RCA Championships in his native Indianapolis, where he lost in the first round to Cyril Saulnier. He reached a career high singles ranking of 536 and won two ITF Futures titles.

== ITF Futures titles ==
=== Singles: (2) ===
No.	Date	Tournament	Surface	Opponent	Score
1.	Oct 2005	Venezuela F6, Valencia	Hard	(Venezuela) Piero Luisi	6–3, 5–7, 6–2
2.	Nov 2005	Canada F1, Toronto	Hard	(United States) Philip Stolt	6–7^{(3)}, 6–3, 7–5
