= Candy Idoko =

Nigerian tennis player

- Country (sports): Nigeria
- Born: 27 September 1985 (age 40) Kaduna, Nigeria
- Height: 5 ft 9 in (175 cm)
- Plays: Right-handed
- Prize money: $16,414

Singles
- Career record: 0–2 (Davis Cup)
- Highest ranking: No. 928 (20 Aug 2007)

Doubles
- Career record: 4–3 (Davis Cup)
- Highest ranking: No. 724 (3 Nov 2008)
Medal record
All-Africa Games
Silver medal – second place	2011 Maputo	Doubles
Bronze medal – third place	2011 Maputo	Singles

Candy Idoko (born 27 September 1985) is a Nigerian former professional tennis player.

Born in Kaduna, Idoko played for the Nigeria Davis Cup team between 2007 and 2010, registering wins in four doubles rubbers. Early in his career he secured funding from a sponsor in the Netherlands which allowed him to tour internationally. He won two ITF Futures titles in doubles while competing on the professional tour. In 2011 he won a doubles silver medal and singles bronze medal at the 2011 All-Africa Games in Maputo.

Idoko's younger brother Emmanuel was also a tennis player.

== ITF Futures finals ==
=== Doubles: 4 (1–3) ===
Finals by surface
Hard (1–1)
Clay (0–2)

Result	W–L	Date	Tournament	Surface	Partner	Opponents	Score
Win	1–0	Aug 2005	Senegal F1, Dakar	Hard	(Nigeria) Lawal Shehu	(Germany) Dennis Biggemann (United Kingdom) Amadeus Fulford-Jones	6–7^{(4)}, 7–6^{(6)}, 6–3
Loss	1–1	Jun 2006	Tunisia F3, Djerba	Clay	(Senegal) Daouda Ndiaye	(Morocco) Rabie Chaki (Morocco) Ali El Alaoui	2–6, 4–6
Loss	1–2	Nov 2007	Rwanda F1, Kigali	Clay	(Nigeria) Lawal Shehu	(Netherlands) Matwé Middelkoop (Lithuania) Gvidas Sabeckis	6–7^{(7)}, 4–6
Loss	1–3	Dec 2007	Nigeria F4, Lagos	Hard	(Nigeria) Lawal Shehu	(Nigeria) Abdul-Mumin Babalola (Nigeria) Jonathan Igbinovia	3–6, 4–6
