= Nikita Kryvonos =

American tennis player

Mykyta Kryvonos
- Native name: Микита Кривонос
- Country (sports): United States
- Born: September 1, 1986 (age 38); Ukrainian SSR, Soviet Union (now Ukraine)
- Height: 6 ft 0 in (183 cm)
- Plays: Right-handed
- Prize money: $83,982

Singles
- Highest ranking: No. 389 (Feb 5, 2007)

Grand Slam singles results
- US Open: Q2 (2006)

Doubles
- Career record: 0–1
- Highest ranking: No. 508 (Nov 27, 2006)

Grand Slam doubles results
- US Open: 1R (2005)

Nikita Kryvonos (Note: Ukrainian: Микита Кривонос, romanized: Mykyta Kryvonos) (born September 1, 1986) is a former professional tennis player.

Born in Ukraine, Kryvonos moved with his family from Donetsk to New York City at the age of 13.

Kryvonos reached a career best singles world ranking of 389 and won four ITF Futures titles. He was used as a practice partner on the United States Davis Cup team in 2006. While competing on the ATP Challenger Tour he had a win over top 100 player Frank Dancevic. In doubles his best ranking was 508 and he played in the main draw of the 2005 US Open as a wildcard pairing with Denis Zivkovic, losing in the first round to José Acasuso and Sebastián Prieto.

In 2017, he was handed a 10-year ban and $20,000 fine by the Tennis Integrity Unit for anti-corruption breaches. He was found guilty of colluding with third parties "to contrive the outcome of a match" at a 2015 Challenger tournament.

== ITF Futures titles ==
=== Singles: (4) ===
| No. | Date | Tournament | Surface | Opponent | Score |
|---|---|---|---|---|---|
| 1. | Mar 2006 | Canada F3, Montreal | Hard | (Netherlands) Robin Haase | 4–6, 7–5, 6–3 |
| 2. | Sep 2007 | USA F24, Irvine | Hard | (Italy) Luigi D'Agord | 7–5, 6–3 |
| 3. | May 2009 | Bulgaria F3, Stara Zagora | Clay | (North Macedonia) Predrag Rusevski | 3–6, 6–3, 6–4 |
| 4. | Jul 2012 | Canada F3, Kelowna | Hard | (United States) Nicolas Meister | 6–3, 4–6, 6–4 |

=== Doubles: (6) ===
| No. | Date | Tournament | Surface | Partner | Opponents | Score |
|---|---|---|---|---|---|---|
| 1. | Jan 2005 | USA F3, Key Biscayne | Hard | (United States) Denis Zivkovic | (Ghana) Henry Adjei-Darko (Nigeria) Jonathan Igbinovia | 7–5, 7–5 |
| 2. | Jul 2006 | Belgium F1, Waterloo | Clay | (Czech Republic) Lukáš Rosol | (France) Jordane Doble (France) Julien Jeanpierre | 6–2, 6–3 |
| 3. | Jul 2006 | Belgium F2, Sint-Katelijne-Waver | Clay | (Czech Republic) Lukáš Rosol | (Netherlands) Stephan Fransen (Netherlands) Romano Frantzen | 6–2, 6–7^{(5)}, 7–5 |
| 4. | Sep 2007 | USA F22, Claremont | Hard | (United States) Michael McClune | (Canada) Philip Bester (United States) Glenn Weiner | 6–4, 6–2 |
| 5. | Dec 2008 | Brazil F33, São Paulo | Hard | (Bulgaria) Vasko Mladenov | (Brazil) Diogo Cruz (Brazil) Rodrigo-Antonio Grilli | 4–6, 6–1, [10–5] |
| 6. | May 2014 | Ukraine F4, Rivne | Clay | (Bulgaria) Vasko Mladenov | (Ukraine) Yurii Dzhavakian (Ukraine) Volodymyr Uzhylovskyi | 6–4, 6–4 |
