= Alex Vlaški =

Serbian tennis player (born 1982)

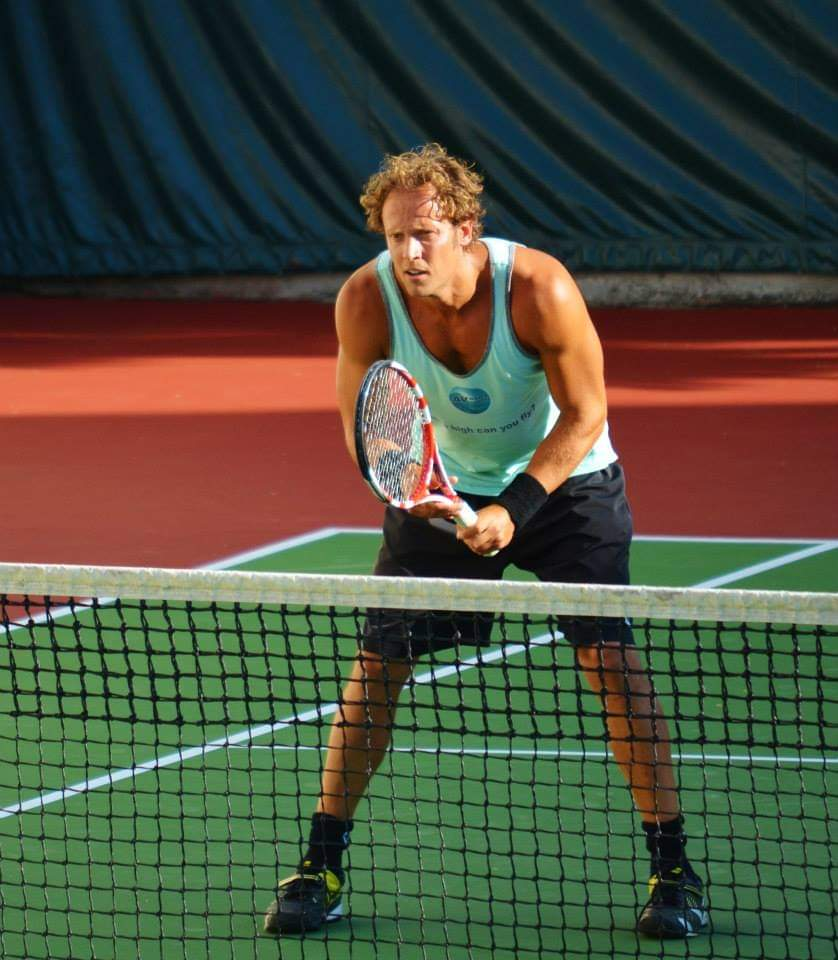
- Full name: Aleksandar Vlaški
- Country (sports): Serbia and Montenegro; Serbia
- Born: 21 April 1982 (age 43); Belgrade, Yugoslavia
- Height: 1.86 m (6 ft 1 in)
- Turned pro: 2000
- Retired: 2007
- Plays: Left-handed
- Prize money: US $50,462

Singles
- Career record: 0–0
- Career titles: 0; 0 Challenger, 4 Futures
- Highest ranking: No. 299 (24 April 2006)

Doubles
- Career record: 0–0
- Career titles: 0; 2 Challenger, 5 Futures
- Highest ranking: No. 160 (10 April 2006)

Aleksandar Vlaški (born 21 April 1982) is a former Serbian professional tennis player, whose name is often spelled Alex Vlaski in English-language media.

== Professional career ==
Born and raised in Belgrade, Vlaški was a three-time All-American tennis player for the Washington Huskies at the University of Washington. In 2003, he reached the NCAA semi-finals and won the ITA All-American Singles Championship, becoming the first Husky since 1924 to claim a national title. During his college career, he amassed the most all-time wins for the Huskies and, in 2004, achieved a career-high ranking of No. 2 in Division I.

A left-handed player, Vlaški competed on the professional tour after graduating from college, reaching career-high rankings of No. 299 in singles and No. 160 in doubles. He also won two ATP Challenger doubles titles.

== Challenger titles ==
=== Doubles: 3 (2 titles, 1 runner-up) ===
Legend ATP Challenger Tour (2–1)	Finals by surface Hard (2–1) Clay (0–0) Grass (0–0)	Finals by setting Outdoor (2–1) Indoor (0–0)

Result	No.	Date	Tournament	Surface	Partner	Opponents	Score
Win	1–0	Jul 2005	Campos do Jordão, Brazil	Hard	(Denmark) Kristian Pless	(Brazil) Franco Ferreiro (Brazil) Marcelo Melo	7–6^{(5)}, 6–4
Win	2–0	Aug 2005	Belo Horizonte, Brazil	Hard	(United States) Lesley Joseph	(Argentina) Juan Martín del Potro (Argentina) Máximo González	7–6^{(8)}, 6–4
Loss	2–1	Nov 2005	Caloundra, Australia	Hard	(Australia) Robert Smeets	(Australia) Peter Luczak (Australia) Shannon Nettle	7–6^{(4)}, 4–6, 2–6
