= Jonathan Igbinovia =

Nigerian tennis player (born 1980)

- Country (sports): Nigeria
- Born: 27 December 1980 (age 45) Lagos, Nigeria
- Plays: Right-handed
- Prize money: $22,970

Singles
- Career record: 19–12 (Davis Cup)
- Highest ranking: No. 461 (25 Apr 2005)

Doubles
- Career record: 12–8 (Davis Cup)
- Highest ranking: No. 506 (7 Feb 2005)
Medal record
All-Africa Games
Silver medal – second place	2003 Abuja	Doubles

Jonathan Igbinovia (born 27 December 1980) is a Nigerian former professional tennis player.

A native of Lagos, Igbinovia had a best singles world ranking of 461 and competed for the Nigeria Davis Cup team from 1998 to 2007, registering 31 overall wins. In 2003 he partnered with Sunday Maku to win a silver medal in doubles at the All-Africa Games in Abuja. He played collegiate tennis early in his career, for Georgia Perimeter College.

Igbinovia is also a musician under the name JayAfrotone and says he has invented his own genre of music called "Afrotone", which he describes as a mix of mainstream music and African sounds.

== ITF Futures finals ==
=== Singles: 3 (1–2) ===
Result	W–L	Date	Tournament	Surface	Opponent	Score
Loss	0–2	Mar 2003	Nigeria F2, Benin City	Hard	(Benin) Arnaud Segodo	2–6, 2–6
Loss	0–2	Oct 2004	Nigeria F6B, Lagos	Hard	(Netherlands) Jasper Smit	5–7, 2–6
Win	1–2	Apr 2005	Nigeria F2, Benin City	Hard	(Russia) Vadim Davletshin	7–5, 6–4

=== Doubles: 9 (4–5) ===
Result	W–L	Date	Tournament	Surface	Partner	Opponents	Score
Loss	0–1	Mar 2004	Nigeria F2, Benin City	Hard	(Nigeria) Sunday Maku	(France) Xavier Audouy (Benin) Arnaud Segodo	6–7^{(5)}, 4–6
Loss	0–2	Jun 2004	Canada F4, Lachine	Hard	(United States) Nicholas Monroe	(United States) Huntley Montgomery (United States) Ryan Sachire	0–6, 5–7
Loss	0–3	Aug 2004	Nigeria F3A, Lagos	Hard	(Ghana) Henry Adjei-Darko	(Netherlands) Romano Frantzen (Netherlands) Floris Kilian	3–6, 5–7
Win	1–3	Aug 2004	Nigeria F3B, Lagos	Hard	(Ghana) Henry Adjei-Darko	(Netherlands) Romano Frantzen (Netherlands) Floris Kilian	6–7^{(10)}, 6–2, 6–4
Loss	1–4	Oct 2004	Nigeria F6A, Lagos	Hard	(Ghana) Henry Adjei-Darko	(South Africa) Raven Klaasen (India) Sunil-Kumar Sipaeya	4–6, 6–7^{(4)}
Loss	1–5	Jan 2005	USA F3, Key Biscayne	Hard	(Ghana) Henry Adjei-Darko	(United States) Nikita Kryvonos (United States) Denis Zivkovic	5–7, 5–7
Win	2–5	Feb 2006	Nigeria F1, Benin City	Hard	(Nigeria) Abdul-Mumin Babalola	(Portugal) Fred Gil (United States) Nicholas Monroe	6–3, 6–7^{(4)}, 6–3
Win	3–5	Mar 2006	Nigeria F2, Benin City	Hard	(Nigeria) Abdul-Mumin Babalola	(Togo) Komlavi Loglo (Ivory Coast) Valentin Sanon	6–1, 7–6^{(4)}
Win	4–5	Dec 2007	Nigeria F4, Lagos	Hard	(Nigeria) Abdul-Mumin Babalola	(Nigeria) Candy Idoko (Nigeria) Lawal Shehu	6–3, 6–4
