= Lawal Shehu =

Nigerian tennis player

- Country (sports): Nigeria
- Born: 15 January 1985 (age 41) Kaduna, Nigeria
- Plays: Right-handed
- Prize money: $13,369

Singles
- Career record: 3–3 (Davis Cup)
- Highest ranking: No. 1074 (5 Mar 2007)

Doubles
- Career record: 15–11 (Davis Cup)
- Highest ranking: No. 666 (10 Mar 2008)
Medal record
All-Africa Games
Silver medal – second place	2011 Maputo	Doubles

Lawal Shehu (born 15 January 1985) is a Nigerian former professional tennis player.

A native of Kaduna, Shehu competed for the Nigeria Davis Cup team from 2005 to 2016, primarily used as a specialist doubles player. He won two ITF Futures titles in doubles. In 2011 he was a doubles silver medalist at the All-Africa Games in Maputo, partnering Candy Idoko. He was based in France during his career.

== ITF Futures finals ==
=== Doubles: 4 (2–2) ===
Finals by surface
Hard (2–1)
Clay (0–1)

Result	W–L	Date	Tournament	Surface	Partner	Opponents	Score
Win	1–0	Aug 2005	Senegal F1, Dakar	Hard	(Nigeria) Candy Idoko	(Germany) Dennis Biggemann (United Kingdom) Amadeus Fulford-Jones	6–7^{(4)}, 7–6^{(6)}, 6–3
Loss	1–1	Nov 2007	Rwanda F1, Kigali	Clay	(Nigeria) Candy Idoko	(Netherlands) Matwé Middelkoop (Lithuania) Gvidas Sabeckis	6–7^{(7)}, 4–6
Loss	1–2	Dec 2007	Nigeria F4, Lagos	Hard	(Nigeria) Candy Idoko	(Nigeria) Abdul-Mumin Babalola (Nigeria) Jonathan Igbinovia	3–6, 4–6
Win	2–2	Mar 2008	Nigeria F2, Benin City	Hard	(Nigeria) Abdul-Mumin Babalola	(Slovakia) Marek Semjan (Slovakia) Ján Stančík	6–3, 6–4
