= Kevin Sorensen =

Irish tennis player

- Country (sports): Ireland
- Born: 10 May 1981 (age 43); Schwäbisch Hall, West Germany
- Height: 6 ft 0 in (183 cm)
- Plays: Right-handed
- Prize money: $21,405

Singles
- Career record: 7–5 (Davis Cup)
- Highest ranking: No. 353 (22 Aug 2005)

Doubles
- Career record: 5–3 (Davis Cup)
- Highest ranking: No. 642 (7 Nov 2005)

Kevin Sorensen (born 10 May 1981) is an Irish former professional tennis player.

Born and raised in Germany, Sorensen was an Irish passport holder through his father Sean Sorensen, a former tour player. His mother Helga is German. He chose to represent Ireland and in 2004 became the Irish No.1.

From 2004 and 2007 he was a member of Ireland's Davis Cup team, which also included his younger brother Louk and was captained by their father. During his Davis Cup career he won seven singles and five doubles rubbers. In 2005 he took a set off Marcos Baghdatis in Dublin.

Sorensen attained a best singles world ranking of 353, winning two ITF Futures titles. En route to his second title, in Cremona in 2005, he had a win over Andy Murray.

== ITF Futures titles ==
=== Singles: (2) ===
No.	Date	Tournament	Surface	Opponent	Score
1.	Oct 2004	France F16, Forbach	Hard	(France) Josselin Ouanna	6–3, 6–4
2.	Apr 2005	Italy F8, Cremona	Hard	(Italy) Alessandro Piccari	6–1, 6–4

=== Doubles: (1) ===
No.	Date	Tournament	Surface	Partner	Opponents	Score
1.	Jun 2002	Jamaica F9, Montego Bay	Hard	(Germany) Konstantin Harle-Zettler	(Canada) Matt Klinger (Australia) Matthew Yeates	7–6^{(5)}, 6–3

== See also ==
- List of Ireland Davis Cup team representatives
