= Abdul-Mumin Babalola =

Nigerian tennis player

- Country (sports): Nigeria
- Born: December 15, 1984 (age 41) Okene, Nigeria
- Plays: Left-handed
- Prize money: $18,764

Singles
- Highest ranking: No. 722 (30 Jul 2007)

Doubles
- Highest ranking: No. 550 (20 Nov 2006)
Medal record
Afro-Asian Games
Silver medal – second place	2003 Hyderabad	Team
Bronze medal – third place	2003 Hyderabad	Doubles

Abdul-Mumin Babalola (born 15 December 1984) is a Nigerian professional tennis player.

Born in Okene, Babalola is a left-hander who plays a serve and volley game. He has competed for the Nigeria Davis Cup team since 2002 and as of 2021 has featured in a record 49 ties. In 2002 he attained Nigeria's number one ranking for the first time and reached his best singles world ranking of 722 in 2007. He has won six ITF Futures doubles titles.

== ITF Futures finals ==
=== Doubles: 9 (6–3) ===
Finals by surface
Clay (0–1)
Hard (6–2)

Result	W–L	Date	Tournament	Surface	Partner	Opponents	Score
Loss	0–1	Aug 2005	Nigeria F3, Lagos	Hard	(Nigeria) Sunday Maku	(Ghana) Henry Adjei-Darko (Ghana) Gunther Darkey	6–3, 1–6, 4–6
Win	1–1	Aug 2005	Nigeria F4, Lagos	Hard	(Nigeria) Sunday Maku	(Ghana) Henry Adjei-Darko (Ghana) Gunther Darkey	6–4, 6–2
Win	2–1	Feb 2006	Nigeria F1, Benin City	Hard	(Nigeria) Jonathan Igbinovia	(Portugal) Fred Gil (United States) Nicholas Monroe	6–3, 6–7^{(4)}, 6–3
Win	3–1	Mar 2006	Nigeria F2, Benin City	Hard	(Nigeria) Jonathan Igbinovia	(Togo) Komlavi Loglo (Ivory Coast) Valentin Sanon	6–1, 7–6^{(4)}
Win	4–1	Oct 2006	Nigeria F6, Lagos	Hard	(Togo) Komlavi Loglo	(Bosnia and Herzegovina) Ivan Dodig (Bosnia and Herzegovina) Zlatan Kadrić	7–5, 7–5
Loss	4–2	Oct 2006	Ghana F1, Accra	Clay	(Togo) Komlavi Loglo	(Morocco) Reda El Amrani (Morocco) Anas Fattar	6–4, 3–6, 4–6
Win	5–2	Dec 2007	Nigeria F4, Lagos	Hard	(Nigeria) Jonathan Igbinovia	(Nigeria) Candy Idoko (Nigeria) Lawal Shehu	6–3, 6–4
Win	6–2	Mar 2008	Nigeria F2, Benin City	Hard	(Nigeria) Lawal Shehu	(Slovakia) Marek Semjan (Slovakia) Ján Stančík	6–3, 6–4
Loss	6–3	Oct 2011	Nigeria F4, Lagos	Hard	(Senegal) Daouda Ndiaye	(France) Paterne Mamata (Uzbekistan) Vaja Uzakov	5–7, 6–3, [6–10]
