= Sunday Maku =

Nigerian tennis player

- Country (sports): Nigeria
- Born: 3 April 1979 (age 47) Ondo, Nigeria
- Plays: Right-handed

Singles
- Career record: 1–2 (Davis Cup)
- Highest ranking: No. 993 (20 Aug 2001)

Doubles
- Career record: 9–0 (Davis Cup)
- Highest ranking: No. 785 (2 Aug 2004)
Medal record
All-Africa Games
Silver medal – second place	2003 Abuja	Doubles
Afro-Asian Games
Silver medal – second place	2003 Hyderabad	Team
Bronze medal – third place	2003 Hyderabad	Singles
Bronze medal – third place	2003 Hyderabad	Doubles

Sunday Maku (born 3 April 1979) is a Nigerian former professional tennis player.

Born in Ondo State, Maku was a number one ranked player in the national rankings and competed for the Nigeria Davis Cup team between 2002 and 2006. He was unbeaten in his nine Davis Cup doubles rubbers.

In 2003 he won medals for Nigeria at both the All-Africa Games and Afro-Asian Games.

== ITF Futures finals ==
=== Doubles: 3 (1–2) ===
Result	Date	Tournament	Surface	Partner	Opponents	Score
Loss	Mar 04	Nigeria F2, Benin City	Hard	(Nigeria) Jonathan Igbinovia	(France) Xavier Audouy (Benin) Arnaud Segodo	6–7^{(5)}, 4–6
Loss	Aug 05	Nigeria F3, Lagos	Hard	(Nigeria) Abdul-Mumin Babalola	(Ghana) Henry Adjei-Darko (Ghana) Gunther Darkey	6–3, 1–6, 4–6
Win	Aug 05	Nigeria F4, Lagos	Hard	(Nigeria) Abdul-Mumin Babalola	(Ghana) Henry Adjei-Darko (Ghana) Gunther Darkey	6–4, 6–2
