= Komlavi Loglo =

Togolese tennis player (born 1984)

- Country (sports): Togo
- Residence: Barcelona, Spain
- Born: 30 December 1984 (age 40); Badou, Togo
- Height: 1.83 m (6 ft 0 in)
- Turned pro: 2003
- Plays: Right-handed (two-handed backhand)
- Prize money: $74,288

Singles
- Career record: 0–1
- Career titles: 0
- Highest ranking: No. 316 (1 October 2007)

Other tournaments
- Olympic Games: 1R (2008)

Doubles
- Career record: 0–0
- Career titles: 0
- Highest ranking: No. 235 (25 July 2005)
- Last updated on: September 25, 2017.

Komlavi Loglo (born 30 December 1984) is a professional Togolese tennis player. He was born in Badou, Togo.

== Career ==
Loglo has spent his career on the Futures circuit, although he has played a handful of Challenger tournaments. He is the top-ranked Togolese player.

On March 31, 2008, Komlavi was awarded a Tri-Partite Invitation to compete at the 2008 Summer Olympics singles event in Beijing. He was the first tennis player from Togo to represent his country at the Olympics. He lost in the first round to South African Kevin Anderson in straight sets.

== Equipment ==
Loglo plays with a Babolat Pure Drive Plus racquet, strung with Babolat Pro Hurricane Tour 17 String. He is sponsored by TTK - Tennis Teknology for clothes and Babolat for racquets and shoes.

== Singles titles ==
Legend (singles)
Grand Slam (0)
Tennis Masters Cup (0)
ATP Masters Series (0)
ATP Tour (0)
Challengers (0)
Futures (7)

| No. | Date | Tournament | Surface | Opponent | Score |
|---|---|---|---|---|---|
| 1. | May 31, 2004 | Tenerife | Hard | (Australia) Jaymon Crabb | 4–6, 6–4, 6–4 |
| 2. | July 26, 2004 | Lomé | Hard | (New Zealand) Adam Thompson | 6–0, 6–4 |
| 3. | October 17, 2005 | Lagos | Hard | (Benin) Arnaud Segodo | 6–4, 3–6, 6–3 |
| 4. | July 31, 2006 | Dakar | Hard | (Ivory Coast) Valentin Sanon | 6–1, 1–6, 6–1 |
| 5. | February 26, 2007 | Benin City | Hard | (Ivory Coast) Valentin Sanon | 6–4, 6–4 |
| 6. | July 30, 2007 | Dakar | Hard | (France) Rudy Coco | 6–2, 6–3 |
| 7. | August 6, 2007 | Yaoundé | Hard | (Romania) Bogdan Leonte | 6–4, 6–4 |
