= 2004 ITF Men's Circuit =

Details

Achievements (singles)

The 2004 ITF Men's Circuit was the 2004 edition of the third-tier tour for men's professional tennis. It was organised by the International Tennis Federation and is a tier below the ATP Challenger Tour. The ITF Men's Circuit included satellite events and 357 'Futures' tournaments played year round across six continents, with prize money ranging from $10,000 to $15,000.

== Futures events ==
$15,000 tournaments
$10,000 tournaments

=== January ===
Tournament	Date	City	Surface	Singles champions	Doubles champions
Germany F1 Futures $10,000	January 5	Nussloch; Germany	Carpet (i)	(Kazakhstan) Yuri Schukin	(Kazakhstan) Yuri Schukin (Russia) Dmitry Vlasov
El Salvador F1 Futures $10,000	January 12	San Salvador; El Salvador	Clay	(Argentina) Brian Dabul	(Argentina) Diego Hartfield (Argentina) Gustavo Marcaccio
USA F1 Futures $10,000	January 12	Tampa; USA	Hard	(United States) Brian Baker	(United States) Brian Baker (United States) Rajeev Ram
Germany F2 Futures $10,000	January 12	Stuttgart; Germany	Hard (i)	(Poland) Łukasz Kubot	(Germany) Jens Knippschild (Sweden) Robert Lindstedt
United Arab Emirates F1 Futures $15,000	January 12	Dubai; United Arab Emirates	Hard	(Poland) Adam Chadaj	(Slovakia) Ivo Klec (Czech Republic) Jaroslav Levinský
France F1 Futures $10,000	January 19	Deauville; France	Clay (i)	(France) Jean-Christophe Faurel	(France) Marc Gicquel (France) Jean-Baptiste Perlant
USA F2 Futures $10,000	January 19	Kissimmee; USA	Hard	(Italy) Federico Luzzi	(United States) Tripp Phillips (United States) Ryan Sachire
Guatemala F1 Futures $10,000	January 19	Guatemala; Guatemala	Hard	(Austria) Herbert Wiltschnig	(Argentina) Carlos Berlocq (Mexico) Miguel Gallardo Valles
Germany F3 Futures $10,000	January 19	Oberhaching; Germany	Hard (i)	(Poland) Łukasz Kubot	(Denmark) Frederik Nielsen (Denmark) Rasmus Nørby
Qatar F1A Futures $15,000	January 19	Doha; Qatar	Hard	(Switzerland) Marco Chiudinelli	(Germany) Philipp Petzschner (Germany) Lars Uebel
Costa Rica F1 Futures $10,000	January 26	San José; Costa Rica	Hard	(Belgium) Stefan Wauters	(Argentina) Carlos Berlocq (Belgium) Stefan Wauters
France F2 Futures $10,000	January 26	Feucherolles; France	Hard (i)	(France) Marc Gicquel	(France) Jean-Michel Pequery (France) Nicolas Tourte
USA F3 Futures $10,000	January 26	Key Biscayne; USA	Hard	(Italy) Federico Luzzi	(United States) Scott Lipsky (United States) David Martin
Bahrain F1 Futures $15,000	January 26	Manama; Bahrain	Hard	(Italy) Uros Vico	(Switzerland) Marco Chiudinelli (Italy) Uros Vico

=== February ===
Tournament	Date	City	Surface	Singles champions	Doubles champions
France F3 Futures $10,000	February 2	Bressuire; France	Hard (i)	(France) Marc Gicquel	(Tunisia) Issam Jellali (Tunisia) Malek Jaziri
Spain F1 Futures $10,000	February 2	Murcia; Spain	Clay	(Spain) Germán Puentes	(Romania) Ionuț Moldovan (Romania) Gabriel Moraru
Spain F2 Futures $10,000	February 9	Algezares; Spain	Clay	(Spain) Nicolás Almagro	(Spain) Nicolás Almagro (Spain) Roberto Menéndez
Croatia F1 Futures $15,000	February 16	Zagreb; Croatia	Hard (i)	(Czech Republic) Pavel Šnobel	(Czech Republic) Martin Štěpánek (Czech Republic) Pavel Šnobel
USA F4 Futures $15,000	February 16	Brownsville; USA	Hard	(United States) Andres Pedroso	(United States) Tres Davis (United States) Eric Nunez
Spain F3 Futures $10,000	February 16	San Javier; Spain	Clay	(Spain) Santiago Ventura	(Spain) Iván Navarro (Spain) Santiago Ventura
Canada F1 Futures $15,000	February 16	Calgary; Canada	Hard (i)	(Sweden) Jacob Adaktusson	(United States) Rajeev Ram (United States) Ryan Sachire
Nigeria F1 Futures $15,000	February 23	Benin City; Nigeria	Hard	(Ivory Coast) Valentin Sanon	(Italy) Leonardo Azzaro (Argentina) Diego Álvarez
Croatia F2 Futures $15,000	February 23	Zagreb; Croatia	Hard (i)	(France) Jean-Christophe Faurel	(Czech Republic) Lukáš Dlouhý (Slovakia) Branislav Sekáč
Spain F4 Futures $10,000	February 23	Cartagena; Spain	Clay	(Spain) Didac Pérez	(Spain) Iván Navarro (Spain) Santiago Ventura
USA F5 Futures $15,000	February 23	Harlingen; USA	Hard	(Argentina) Nicolás Todero	(United States) Scott Lipsky (United States) David Martin
Canada F2 Futures $15,000	February 23	Edmonton; Canada	Hard (i)	(United States) Rajeev Ram	(United States) K. J. Hippensteel (United States) Ryan Haviland
India F1A Futures $10,000	February 23	New Delhi; India	Hard	(Pakistan) Aisam-ul-Haq Qureshi	(India) Mustafa Ghouse (India) Vishal Uppal

=== March ===
Tournament	Date	City	Surface	Singles champions	Doubles champions
India F1 Futures $10,000	March 1	Chennai; India	Hard	(Uzbekistan) Dimitri Mazur	(India) Mustafa Ghouse (India) Vishal Uppal
Portugal F1 Futures $10,000	March 1	Faro; Portugal	Hard	(Spain) Guillermo García López	(Germany) Christopher Kas (Germany) Philipp Petzschner
New Zealand F1 Futures $10,000	March 1	Blenheim; New Zealand	Hard	(Australia) Domenic Marafiote	(South Korea) Im Kyu-tae (South Korea) Lee Seung-hoon
Nigeria F2 Futures $15,000	March 1	Benin City; Nigeria	Hard	(United Kingdom) James Auckland	(France) Xavier Audouy (Benin) Arnaud Segodo
USA F6 Futures $15,000	March 1	McAllen; USA	Hard	(Argentina) Nicolás Todero	(South Africa) Raven Klaasen (Argentina) Nicolás Todero
Brazil F1 Futures $15,000	March 1	Florianópolis; Brazil	Clay	(Brazil) Bruno Soares	(Brazil) Marcelo Melo (Brazil) Bruno Soares
India F2 Futures $10,000	March 8	Kolkata; India	Clay	(India) Somdev Devvarman	(India) Mustafa Ghouse (India) Vishal Uppal
France F4 Futures $15,000	March 8	Lille; France	Hard (i)	(France) Jean-Michel Pequery	(France) Jean-François Bachelot (France) Jean-Michel Pequery
New Zealand F2 Futures $10,000	March 8	Hamilton; New Zealand	Hard	(Japan) Michihisa Onoda	(Thailand) Sanchai Ratiwatana (Thailand) Sonchat Ratiwatana
Australia F1 Futures $15,000	March 8	Burnie; Australia	Hard	(Greece) Vasilis Mazarakis	(Argentina) Juan Pablo Brzezicki (South Africa) Louis Vosloo
Mexico F1 Futures $15,000	March 8	Chetumal; Mexico	Hard	(Austria) Oliver Marach	(United States) Scott Lipsky (United States) David Martin
Brazil F2 Futures $15,000	March 8	Caldas Novas; Brazil	Hard	(Brazil) Bruno Soares	(Brazil) Marcelo Melo (Brazil) Bruno Soares
Portugal F2 Futures $10,000	March 9	Albufeira; Portugal	Hard	(Belgium) Jeroen Masson	(Chile) Juan Ignacio Cerda (Netherlands) Jasper Smit
France F5 Futures $15,000	March 15	Poitiers; France	Hard (i)	(Italy) Uros Vico	(United States) Doug Bohaboy (Brazil) Josh Goffi
Portugal F3 Futures $10,000	March 15	Lagos; Portugal	Hard	(Belgium) Jeroen Masson	(Portugal) Fred Gil (Portugal) Bernardo Mota
New Zealand F3 Futures $10,000	March 15	North Shore; New Zealand	Hard (i)	(Japan) Takahiro Terachi	(South Korea) Im Kyu-tae (South Korea) Lee Seung-hoon
Australia F2 Futures $15,000	March 15	Devonport; Australia	Hard	(South Africa) Rik de Voest	(Australia) Nathan Healey (Australia) Robert Smeets
USA F7 Futures $15,000	March 15	Pensacola; USA	Hard	(United States) Andres Pedroso	(United States) Cody Conley (United States) Ryan Newport
Mexico F2 Futures $15,000	March 22	Naucalpan; Mexico	Hard	(Mexico) Alejandro Hernández	(Mexico) Miguel Gallardo Valles (Mexico) Alejandro Hernández
USA F8 Futures $15,000	March 22	Little Rock; USA	Hard	(Azerbaijan) Emin Ağayev	(United States) Rajeev Ram (United States) Ryan Sachire
Greece F1 Futures $15,000	March 22	Athens; Greece	Hard	(United Kingdom) Andrew Banks	(United Kingdom) Mark Hilton (United Kingdom) Jonathan Marray
Italy F1 Futures $10,000	March 29	Frascati; Italy	Clay	(Italy) Daniele Giorgini	(Germany) Marcello Craca (Kazakhstan) Yuri Schukin
Greece F2 Futures $15,000	March 29	Syros; Greece	Hard	(Algeria) Lamine Ouahab	(Romania) Florin Mergea (Romania) Horia Tecău
USA F9 Futures $15,000	March 29	Mobile; USA	Hard	(United States) Robert Yim	(United States) Michael Kosta (New Zealand) Wesley Whitehouse

=== April ===
Tournament	Date	City	Surface	Singles champions	Doubles champions
France F6 Futures $15,000	April 5	Angers; France	Clay (i)	(France) Nicolas Devilder	(France) Xavier Audouy (France) Nicolas Tourte
Italy F2 Futures $10,000	April 5	Monza; Italy	Clay	(Argentina) Andres Dellatorre	(Italy) Alessandro Da Col (Italy) Stefano Mocci
France F7 Futures $15,000	April 12	Grasse; France	Clay	(France) Gilles Simon	(France) Gilles Simon (France) Jo-Wilfried Tsonga
Italy F3 Futures $10,000	April 12	Cremona; Italy	Hard	(Italy) Andrea Stoppini	(Spain) David Marrero (Spain) José Antonio Sánchez de Luna
Japan F1 Futures $10,000	April 12	Kofu; Japan	Carpet	(Japan) Michihisa Onoda	(United States) Scott Lipsky (United States) David Martin
Uzbekistan F1 Futures $15,000	April 12	Qarshi; Uzbekistan	Hard	(Russia) Vadim Davletshin	(Croatia) Ivan Cerović (North Macedonia) Lazar Magdinčev
Italy F4 Futures $15,000	April 19	Bergamo; Italy	Clay	(Czech Republic) Lukáš Dlouhý	(Italy) Fabio Colangelo (Italy) Alessandro Motti
Germany F4 Futures $10,000	April 19	Riemerling; Germany	Clay	(Belgium) Jeroen Masson	(Netherlands) Edwin Kempes (Netherlands) Melvyn op der Heijde
Japan F2 Futures $10,000	April 19	Shizuoka; Japan	Carpet	(Japan) Takahiro Terachi	(New Zealand) Matt Prentice (New Zealand) Lee Radovanovich
Qatar F1 Futures $15,000	April 19	Doha; Qatar	Hard	(France) Jean-Michel Pequery	(Romania) Florin Mergea (Romania) Horia Tecău
Uzbekistan F2 Futures $15,000	April 19	Guliston; Uzbekistan	Hard	(Russia) Igor Kunitsyn	(Russia) Vadim Kutsenko (Kazakhstan) Alexey Kedryuk
Great Britain F1 Futures $15,000	April 26	Bournemouth; Great Britain	Clay	(France) Gaël Monfils	(United Kingdom) James Auckland (United States) Thomas Blake
Italy F5 Futures $10,000	April 26	Padova; Italy	Clay	(Spain) José Antonio Sánchez de Luna	(Greece) Lefteris Alexiou (Greece) Alexandros Jakupovic
Germany F5 Futures $15,000	April 26	Esslingen; Germany	Clay	(Germany) Tobias Summerer	(Germany) Marcello Craca (Germany) Sebastian Fitz
Algeria F1 Futures $15,000	April 26	Algiers; Algeria	Clay	(Czech Republic) Jaroslav Pospíšil	(Italy) Fabio Colangelo (Italy) Stefano Mocci
Japan F3 Futures $10,000	April 26	Tokyo; Japan	Hard	(Japan) Satoshi Iwabuchi	(United States) Scott Lipsky (United States) David Martin
Mexico F4 Futures $10,000	April 26	Ciudad Obregón; Mexico	Hard	(Mexico) Alejandro Hernández	(Brazil) Lucas Engel (Brazil) Marcelo Melo
Qatar F2 Futures $15,000	April 26	Doha; Qatar	Hard	(France) Jean-Michel Pequery	(India) Mustafa Ghouse (India) Harsh Mankad
Argentina F1 Futures $10,000	April 26	Buenos Aires; Argentina	Clay	(Argentina) Cristian Villagrán	(Argentina) Lionel Noviski (Argentina) Agustin Tarantino

=== May ===
Tournament	Date	City	Surface	Singles champions	Doubles champions
Great Britain F2 Futures $15,000	May 3	Edinburgh; Great Britain	Clay	(France) Éric Prodon	(Australia) Andrew Derer (Australia) Joseph Sirianni
Hungary F1 Futures $10,000	May 3	Szolnok; Hungary	Clay	(Serbia and Montenegro) Novak Djokovic	(Hungary) György Balázs (Hungary) Sebő Kiss
Italy F6 Futures $10,000	May 3	Valdengo; Italy	Clay	(Argentina) Andres Dellatorre	(Germany) Christopher Kas (Germany) Philipp Petzschner
Spain F5 Futures $10,000	May 3	Reus; Spain	Clay	(Spain) Marcel Granollers	(Spain) Carlos Rexach-Itoiz (Spain) Gabriel Trujillo Soler
Romania F1 Futures $10,000	May 3	Bucharest; Romania	Clay	(Romania) Adrian Ungur	(Romania) Adrian Barbu (Romania) Victor Ioniță
Germany F6 Futures $10,000	May 3	Neheim-Husten; Germany	Clay	(Latvia) Andis Juška	(Poland) Michał Przysiężny (Poland) Filip Urban
Algeria F2 Futures $15,000	May 3	Sidi Fredj; Algeria	Clay	(France) Gilles Simon	(Czech Republic) Dušan Karol (Czech Republic) Jaroslav Pospíšil
Colombia F1 Futures $15,000	May 3	Cali; Colombia	Clay	(Brazil) Júlio Silva	(Colombia) Michael Quintero (Colombia) Carlos Salamanca
Korea Rep. F1 Futures $15,000	May 3	Seogwipo; Korea Rep.	Hard	(Japan) Gouichi Motomura	(South Korea) Im Kyu-tae (South Korea) Lee Hyung-taik
Lebanon F1 Futures $15,000	May 3	Jounieh; Lebanon	Clay	(Sweden) Mathias Hellström	(India) Mustafa Ghouse (India) Harsh Mankad
Mexico F5 Futures $10,000	May 3	Guadalajara; Mexico	Clay	(Mexico) Alejandro Hernández	(Brazil) Marcelo Melo (Brazil) Gabriel Pitta
USA F10 Futures $10,000	May 3	Vero Beach; USA	Clay	(Venezuela) José de Armas	(United States) Scott Lipsky (United States) David Martin
Uzbekistan F3 Futures $15,000	May 3	Namangan; Uzbekistan	Hard	(United Kingdom) Jonathan Marray	(United Kingdom) Dan Kiernan (United Kingdom) Jonathan Marray
Argentina F2 Futures $10,000	May 3	Buenos Aires; Argentina	Clay	(Argentina) Cristian Villagrán	(Argentina) Juan-Pablo Amado (Argentina) Eduardo Schwank
Romania F2 Futures $10,000	May 10	Pitești; Romania		(Austria) Rainer Eitzinger	(Romania) Adrian Barbu (Romania) Victor Ioniță
Spain F6 Futures $10,000	May 10	Vic; Spain		(Spain) Iván Navarro	(Spain) Carlos Rexach-Itoiz (Spain) Gabriel Trujillo Soler
Italy F7 Futures $10,000	May 10	Pavia; Italy	Clay	(Argentina) Andres Dellatorre	(Italy) Fabio Colangelo (Italy) Alessandro Da Col
Hungary F2 Futures $10,000	May 10	Hódmezővásárhely; Hungary	Clay	(Hungary) Kornél Bardóczky	(Hungary) Kornél Bardóczky (Romania) Gabriel Moraru
USA F11 Futures $10,000	May 10	Orange Park; USA	Clay	(Netherlands) Melvyn op der Heijde	(United States) Levar Harper-Griffith (United States) Chris Kwon
Lebanon F2 Futures $15,000	May 10	Jounieh; Lebanon	Clay	(Romania) Florin Mergea	(Romania) Florin Mergea (Romania) Horia Tecău
Korea Rep. F2 Futures $15,000	May 10	Seogwipo; Korea Rep.	Hard	(Japan) Gouichi Motomura	(South Korea) Dong-Hyun Kim (South Korea) Kwon Oh-hee
Colombia F2 Futures $15,000	May 10	Pereira; Colombia	Clay	(Brazil) Júlio Silva	(Brazil) Lucas Engel (Brazil) André Ghem
Uzbekistan F4 Futures $15,000	May 10	Andijan; Uzbekistan	Hard	(United Kingdom) Jonathan Marray	(Kazakhstan) Alexey Kedryuk (Ukraine) Orest Tereshchuk
Argentina F3 Futures $10,000	May 10	Buenos Aires; Argentina	Clay	(Argentina) Carlos Berlocq	(Argentina) Carlos Berlocq (Argentina) Antonio Pastorino
Mexico F6 Futures $10,000	May 10	Celaya; Mexico	Hard	(United States) Tres Davis	(Mexico) Bruno Echagaray (Mexico) Jorge Haro
Italy F8 Futures $10,000	May 17	Verona; Italy	Clay	(Italy) Simone Bolelli	(Italy) Alberto Brizzi (Italy) Simone Bolelli
Mexico F6A Futures $10,000	May 17	Coatzacoalcos; Mexico	Hard	(Brazil) Eduardo Bohrer	(Brazil) Marcelo Melo (Brazil) Gabriel Pitta
Saudi Arabia F1 Futures $15,000	May 17	Riyadh; Saudi Arabia	Hard	(Romania) Horia Tecău	(United Kingdom) Jamie Delgado (Portugal) Leonardo Tavares
USA F12 Futures $10,000	May 17	Tampa; USA	Clay	(United States) K. J. Hippensteel	(United States) K. J. Hippensteel (United States) Ryan Haviland
Spain F7 Futures $10,000	May 17	Lleida; Spain	Clay	(Netherlands) Jesse Huta Galung	(Spain) Carlos Rexach-Itoiz (Spain) Gabriel Trujillo Soler
Romania F3 Futures $10,000	May 17	Iași; Romania	Clay	(Romania) Victor Ioniță	(Italy) Francesco Piccari (Italy) Alessandro Piccari
Bosnia & Herzegovina F1 Futures $10,000	May 17	Sarajevo; Bosnia and Herzegovina	Clay	(Serbia and Montenegro) Vladimir Pavićević	(Czech Republic) Jakub Hasek (Czech Republic) Josef Neštický
Bosnia & Herzegovina F2 Futures $10,000	May 24	Brčko District; Bosnia and Herzegovina	Clay	(Serbia and Montenegro) Ilija Bozoljac	(Serbia and Montenegro) Nikola Ćirić (Serbia and Montenegro) Goran Tošić
Romania F4 Futures $10,000	May 24	Bucharest; Romania	Clay	(Italy) Francesco Piccari	(Russia) Philipp Mukhometov (Russia) Evgueni Smirnov
Italy F9 Futures $10,000	May 24	Teramo; Italy	Clay	(Brazil) Júlio Silva	(Italy) Alessandro Motti (Italy) Simone Vagnozzi
Saudi Arabia F2 Futures $15,000	May 24	Riyadh; Saudi Arabia	Hard	(Pakistan) Aisam-ul-Haq Qureshi	(Germany) Sebastian Fitz (Egypt) Karim Maamoun
Japan F4 Futures $15,000	May 24	Munakata; Japan	Hard	(South Korea) Kim Young-jun	(Thailand) Sanchai Ratiwatana (Thailand) Sonchat Ratiwatana
Poland F1 Futures $10,000	May 24	Gdynia; Poland	Clay	(Poland) Adam Chadaj	(Poland) Maciej Diłaj (Poland) Andrzej Grusiecki
Spain F8 Futures $10,000	May 24	Balaguer; Spain	Clay	(Spain) Gabriel Trujillo Soler	(Spain) Miguel Ángel López Jaén (Spain) Pablo Santos
Czech Rep. F1 Futures $10,000	May 24	Most; Czech Republic	Clay	(Czech Republic) Lukáš Dlouhý	(Czech Republic) Ladislav Chramosta (Slovakia) Igor Zelenay
Hungary F3 Futures $10,000	May 24	Miskolc; Hungary	Clay	(Slovakia) Ladislav Švarc	(Slovakia) Filip Polášek (Slovakia) Ladislav Švarc
Czech Rep. F2 Futures $10,000	May 31	Karlovy Vary; Czech Republic	Clay	(Czech Republic) Lukáš Dlouhý	(Czech Republic) Daniel Lustig (Czech Republic) Jan Mertl
Mexico F7 Futures $10,000	May 31	Monterrey; Mexico	Hard	(Brazil) Alessandro Camarço	(Chile) Juan Ignacio Cerda (Brazil) Rodrigo-Antonio Grilli
Poland F2 Futures $10,000	May 31	Koszalin; Poland	Clay	(Poland) Michał Przysiężny	(Poland) Radosław Nijaki (Poland) Dawid Olejniczak
Kuwait F1 Futures $15,000	May 31	Mishref; Kuwait	Hard	(Sweden) Filip Prpic	(India) Rohan Bopanna (India) Mustafa Ghouse
Japan F5 Futures $15,000	May 31	Munakata; Japan	Hard	(South Korea) Im Kyu-tae	(Japan) Joji Miyao (Japan) Hiroyasu Sato
Slovenia F1 Futures $10,000	May 31	Kranj; Slovenia	Clay	(Argentina) Carlos Berlocq	(Slovenia) Andrej Kračman (Switzerland) Benjamin Rufer
Italy F10 Futures $10,000	May 31	Castelfranco Veneto; Italy	Clay	(Italy) Francesco Piccari	(Italy) Flavio Cipolla (Italy) Alessandro Motti
Romania F5 Futures $10,000	May 31	Pitești; Romania	Clay	(Romania) Victor Ioniță	(Romania) Adrian Barbu (Romania) Andrei Mlendea
Spain F9 Futures $15,000	May 31	Tenerife; Spain	Hard	(Togo) Komlavi Loglo	(Spain) Javier Genaro-Martinez (Togo) Komlavi Loglo
Bosnia & Herzegovina F3 Futures $10,000	May 31	Prijedor; Bosnia and Herzegovina	Clay	(Serbia and Montenegro) Vladimir Pavićević	(Argentina) Juan-Martín Aranguren (Argentina) Lionel Noviski

=== June ===
Tournament	Date	City	Surface	Singles champions	Doubles champions
Spain F10 Futures $10,000	June 7	La Palma; Spain	Hard	(Spain) Bartolomé Salvá Vidal	(Spain) Daniel Muñoz de la Nava (Spain) Daniel Monedero
Romania F6 Futures $10,000	June 7	Constanța; Romania	Clay	(Romania) Gabriel Moraru	(Romania) Gabriel Moraru (Romania) Horia Tecău
Italy F11 Futures $10,000	June 7	San Floriano; Italy	Clay	(Uzbekistan) Farrukh Dustov	(Italy) Alessandro Motti (Italy) Giancarlo Petrazzuolo
Serbia & Montenegro F1 Futures $10,000	June 7	Sombor; Serbia & Montenegro	Clay	(Austria) Philipp Müllner	(Serbia and Montenegro) Nikola Ćirić (Serbia and Montenegro) Goran Tošić
Slovenia F2 Futures $10,000	June 7	Maribor; Slovenia	Clay	(Slovenia) Grega Žemlja	(Spain) Antonio Baldellou-Esteva (Spain) Germán Puentes
Tunisia F1 Futures $10,000	June 7	Tunis; Tunisia	Clay	(Spain) Pablo Santos	(Italy) Mattia Livraghi (Egypt) Karim Maamoun
USA F13 Futures $10,000	June 7	Yuba City; USA	Hard	(United States) Scott Lipsky	(Australia) Mark Hlawaty (Australia) Brad Weston
Kuwait F2 Futures $15,000	June 7	Mishref; Kuwait	Hard	(Sweden) Filip Prpic	(Germany) Sebastian Fitz (Germany) Frank Moser
Poland F3 Futures $10,000	June 7	Warsaw; Poland	Clay	(Czech Republic) Dušan Karol	(Australia) Sadik Kadir (Czech Republic) Dušan Karol
Mexico F8 Futures $10,000	June 7	Torreón; Mexico	Hard	(Argentina) Alejandro Fabbri	(Brazil) Eduardo Bohrer (Brazil) André Ghem
Czech Rep. F3 Futures $10,000	June 7	Jablonec nad Nisou; Czech Republic	Clay	(Czech Republic) Lukáš Dlouhý	(Czech Republic) Daniel Lustig (Czech Republic) Jan Mertl
Mexico F9 Futures $10,000	June 14	Mexico City; Mexico	Hard		
Canada F3 Futures $10,000	June 14	Montreal; Canada	Hard	(Australia) Shannon Nettle	(United States) Huntley Montgomery (United States) Ryan Sachire
USA F14 Futures $10,000	June 14	Sunnyvale; USA	Hard	(Argentina) Alejandro Fabbri	(United States) K. J. Hippensteel (United States) Ryan Haviland
Tunisia F2 Futures $10,000	June 14	Tunis; Tunisia	Clay	(France) Dimitri Lorin	(Tunisia) Walid Jallali (Kazakhstan) Alexey Kedryuk
Slovenia F3 Futures $10,000	June 14	Koper; Slovenia	Clay	(Slovakia) Kamil Čapkovič	(Spain) Antonio Baldellou-Esteva (Spain) Germán Puentes
Serbia & Montenegro F2 Futures $10,000	June 14	Belgrade; Serbia & Montenegro	Clay	(Serbia and Montenegro) Nikola Ćirić	(Serbia and Montenegro) Ilija Bozoljac (Serbia and Montenegro) David Savić
Finland F1 Futures $10,000	June 14	Savitaipale; Finland	Clay	(Czech Republic) Petr Dezort	(Denmark) Frederik Nielsen (Denmark) Rasmus Nørby
Italy F12 Futures $10,000	June 14	Bassano del Grappa; Italy	Clay	(Italy) Matteo Colla	(Italy) Alessandro Motti (Italy) Giancarlo Petrazzuolo
Romania F7 Futures $10,000	June 14	Bucharest; Romania	Clay	(Romania) Adrian Ungur	(Romania) Adrian Cruciat (Spain) Ferran Ventura-Martell
Spain F11 Futures $15,000	June 14	Lanzarote; Spain	Hard	(France) Jo-Wilfried Tsonga	(Russia) Andrei Cherkasov (Ukraine) Orest Tereshchuk
France F8 Futures $15,000	June 14	Blois; France	Clay	(Spain) Mariano Albert-Ferrando	(Argentina) Brian Dabul (Argentina) Diego Hartfield
France F9 Futures $15,000	June 21	Toulon; France	Clay	(Argentina) Carlos Berlocq	(Australia) Andrew Derer (Poland) Filip Urban
Spain F12 Futures $10,000	June 21	Maspalomas; Spain	Clay	(Spain) Jacobo Díaz	(Spain) Jordi Marse-Vidri (Spain) Carles Poch Gradin
Germany F8 Futures $10,000	June 21	Leun; Germany	Clay	(Hungary) Kornél Bardóczky	(Czech Republic) Pavel Šnobel (Austria) Martin Slanar
Romania F8 Futures $10,000	June 21	Focșani; Romania	Clay	(Romania) Cătălin-Ionuț Gârd	(Romania) Cătălin-Ionuț Gârd (Romania) Andrei Mlendea
Netherlands F1 Futures $15,000	June 21	Alkmaar; Netherlands	Clay	(Belgium) Stefan Wauters	(Argentina) Diego Hartfield (Argentina) Cristian Villagrán
Finland F2 Futures $10,000	June 21	Vierumäki; Finland	Clay	(Latvia) Andis Juška	(Denmark) Frederik Nielsen (Denmark) Rasmus Nørby
Serbia & Montenegro F3 Futures $10,000	June 21	Belgrade; Serbia & Montenegro	Clay	(Slovakia) Frantisek Polyak	(Bulgaria) Ilia Kushev (Bulgaria) Yordan Kanev
Italy F13 Futures $10,000	June 21	Cesena; Italy	Clay	(Italy) Matteo Colla	(Germany) Christopher Kas (Italy) Federico Torresi
Tunisia F3 Futures $10,000	June 21	Tunis; Tunisia	Clay	(Spain) Pablo Santos	(Tunisia) Walid Jallali (Kazakhstan) Alexey Kedryuk
USA F15 Futures $10,000	June 21	Auburn; USA	Hard	(Bosnia and Herzegovina) Amer Delić	(United States) Lesley Joseph (United States) Scott Lipsky
Canada F4 Futures $10,000	June 21	Lachine, Quebec; Canada	Hard	(United States) Michael Russell	(United States) Huntley Montgomery (United States) Ryan Sachire
Ukraine F1 Futures $10,000	June 21	Dnipropetrovsk; Ukraine	Clay	(Slovakia) Viktor Bruthans	(Russia) Evgueni Smirnov (Russia) Dmitry Vlasov
Ukraine F2 Futures $10,000	June 28	Donetsk; Ukraine	Hard	(Russia) Alexander Markin	(Ukraine) Mikhail Filima (Ukraine) Orest Tereshchuk
Canada F5 Futures $10,000	June 28	Toronto; Canada	Hard	(Japan) Takahiro Terachi	(Canada) Matt Klinger (Australia) Daniel Wendler
USA F16 Futures $10,000	June 28	Chico; USA	Hard	(United States) Michael Yani	(United States) Jason Cook (United States) Lester Cook
USA F17 Futures $10,000	June 28	Buffalo; USA	Clay	(United States) Michael Russell	(United States) Goran Dragicevic (United States) Mirko Pehar
Italy F14 Futures $10,000	June 28	Ferrara; Italy	Clay	(Italy) Alessandro Accardo	(Argentina) Diego Junqueira (Argentina) Damián Patriarca
Netherlands F2 Futures $15,000	June 28	Heerhugowaard; Netherlands	Clay	(Netherlands) Melle van Gemerden	(Netherlands) Bart De Gier (Netherlands) Michel Koning
Romania F9 Futures $10,000	June 28	Balș; Romania	Clay	(Romania) Victor Ioniță	(Romania) Gabriel Moraru (Romania) Horia Tecău
Germany F9 Futures $15,000	June 28	Kassel; Germany	Clay	(Morocco) Mounir El Aarej	(Slovakia) Filip Polášek (Slovakia) Ladislav Švarc
Denmark F1 Futures $10,000	June 28	Helsingør; Denmark	Clay	(Sweden) Daniel Klemetz	(Denmark) Frederik Nielsen (Denmark) Rasmus Nørby

=== July ===
Tournament	Date	City	Surface	Singles champions	Doubles champions
Denmark F2 Futures $10,000	July 5	Hørsholm; Denmark	Clay	(Latvia) Andis Juška	(Denmark) Frederik Nielsen (Denmark) Rasmus Nørby
Austria F1 Futures $15,000	July 5	Telfs; Austria	Clay	(Czech Republic) Jan Mertl	(Germany) Benedikt Dorsch (Belgium) Stefan Wauters
France F10 Futures $15,000	July 5	Bourg-en-Bresse; France	Clay	(France) Bertrand Contzler	(Argentina) Brian Dabul (Algeria) Lamine Ouahab
Germany F10 Futures $10,000	July 5	Forchheim; Germany	Clay	(Germany) Lars Uebel	(Germany) Peter Steinberger (Germany) Marcel Zimmermann
Spain F13 Futures $15,000	July 5	Alicante; Spain	Clay	(Spain) Mariano Albert-Ferrando	(Spain) Antonio Baldellou-Esteva (Spain) Germán Puentes
Italy F15 Futures $10,000	July 5	Bologna; Italy	Clay	(Italy) Simone Bolelli	(Italy) Alberto Brizzi (Italy) Simone Bolelli
Romania F10 Futures $10,000	July 5	Câmpina; Romania	Clay	(Romania) Adrian Cruciat	(Greece) Lefteris Alexiou (Greece) Theodoros Angelinos
Ukraine F3 Futures $10,000	July 5	Dnipropetrovsk; Ukraine	Clay	(Russia) Alexander Markin	(Russia) Alexander Markin (Russia) Sergei Pozdnev
USA F18 Futures $10,000	July 5	Pittsburgh; USA	Clay	(United States) Michael Russell	(United States) Tres Davis (United States) Ryan Sachire
USA F19 Futures $10,000	July 12	Peoria; USA	Clay	(Mexico) Luis-Manuel Flores	(Australia) Raphael Durek (Australia) Adam Feeney
Morocco F1 Futures $10,000	July 12	Rabat; Morocco	Clay	(Morocco) Mehdi Tahiri	(Italy) Massimo Bosa (Switzerland) Benjamin Rufer
Romania F11 Futures $10,000	July 12	Bucharest; Romania	Clay	(Romania) Adrian Cruciat	(Romania) Adrian Cruciat (Romania) Adrian Gavrilă
Spain F14 Futures $15,000	July 12	Elche; Spain	Clay	(Spain) Ivan Esquerdo	(Spain) Ivan Esquerdo (Spain) Marc Fornell Mestres
Germany F11 Futures $15,000	July 12	Trier; Germany	Clay	(France) Éric Prodon	(Netherlands) Michel Koning (Netherlands) Steven Korteling
France F11 Futures $15,000	July 12	Saint-Gervais; France	Clay	(France) Bertrand Contzler	(Argentina) Diego Álvarez (Argentina) Brian Dabul
Austria F2 Futures $15,000	July 12	Kramsach; Austria	Clay	(Uzbekistan) Farrukh Dustov	(Austria) Johannes Ager (Austria) Marko Neunteibl
Denmark F3 Futures $10,000	July 12	Lyngby; Denmark	Clay	(Sweden) Michael Ryderstedt	(Netherlands) Bart Beks (Italy) Stefano Ianni
Germany F12 Futures $10,000	July 19	Lohr am Main; Germany	Clay	(Germany) Alexander Flock	(Netherlands) Jasper Smit (Germany) Lars Uebel
Spain F15 Futures $10,000	July 19	Gandia; Spain	Clay	(Spain) Jacobo Díaz	(Spain) Ivan Esquerdo (Spain) Marc Fornell Mestres
Italy F17 Futures $10,000	July 19	Arezzo; Italy	Clay	(Argentina) Máximo González	(Italy) Stefano Mocci (Italy) Giancarlo Petrazzuolo
Romania F12 Futures $10,000	July 19	Brașov; Romania	Clay	(Romania) Artemon Apostu-Efremov	(Romania) Cătălin-Ionuț Gârd (Romania) Andrei Mlendea
Morocco F2 Futures $10,000	July 19	Marrakesh; Morocco	Clay	(Spain) Frank Cóndor	(New Zealand) Adam Thompson (Netherlands Antilles) Martijn van Haasteren
USA F20 Futures $10,000	July 19	Joplin; USA	Hard	(United States) Jesse Witten	(United States) KC Corkery (United States) Jeremy Wurtzman
USA F21 Futures $10,000	July 26	Godfrey; USA	Hard	(Brazil) Rodrigo-Antonio Grilli	(United States) Goran Dragicevic (United States) Mirko Pehar
Morocco F3 Futures $10,000	July 26	Agadir; Morocco	Clay	(France) David Guez	(Italy) Alessandro Accardo (Italy) Fabio Colangelo
Togo F1 Futures $10,000	July 26	Lomé; Togo	Hard	(Togo) Komlavi Loglo	(Togo) Kwami Gakpo (Togo) Komlavi Loglo
Romania F13 Futures $10,000	July 26	Arad; Romania	Clay	(Romania) Victor Ioniță	(Romania) Cătălin-Ionuț Gârd (Romania) Andrei Mlendea
Italy F18 Futures $10,000	July 26	Foligno; Italy	Clay	(Croatia) Ivan Cerović	(Italy) Stefano Mocci (Italy) Giancarlo Petrazzuolo
Estonia F1 Futures $10,000	July 26	Tallinn; Estonia	Clay	(Finland) Janne Ojala	(Sweden) Johan Brunström (Sweden) Alexander Hartman
Spain F16 Futures $10,000	July 26	Dénia; Spain	Clay	(Spain) Javier Genaro-Martinez	(Spain) Antonio Baldellou-Esteva (Spain) Germán Puentes

=== August ===
Tournament	Date	City	Surface	Singles champions	Doubles champions
Spain F17 Futures $10,000	August 2	Xàtiva; Spain	Clay	(United Kingdom) Andy Murray	(Spain) Jose-Manuel Garcia-Rodriguez (Spain) Arkaitz Manzarbeitia-Ugate
Great Britain F3 Futures $15,000	August 2	Wrexham; Great Britain	Hard	(United Kingdom) David Sherwood	(United Kingdom) Richard Bloomfield (United Kingdom) Ken Skupski
Serbia & Montenegro F4 Futures $10,000	August 2	Zaječar; Serbia & Montenegro	Clay	(Serbia and Montenegro) Vladimir Pavićević	(Serbia and Montenegro) Nikola Ćirić (Serbia and Montenegro) Goran Tošić
Latvia F1 Futures $10,000	August 2	Jūrmala; Latvia	Clay	(Poland) Radosław Nijaki	(Netherlands) Bart Beks (Estonia) Mait Künnap
Italy F19 Futures $10,000	August 2	Sezze; Italy	Clay	(Italy) Giancarlo Petrazzuolo	(Bosnia and Herzegovina) Ismar Gorčić (Italy) Giancarlo Petrazzuolo
Nigeria F3A Futures $10,000	August 2	Lagos; Nigeria	Hard	(Ghana) Henry Adjei-Darko	(Netherlands) Romano Frantzen (Netherlands) Floris Kilian
Indonesia F1 Futures $10,000	August 2	Jakarta; Indonesia	Hard	(South Korea) Lee Seung-hoon	(Indonesia) Hendri Susilo Pramono (Indonesia) Febi Widhiyanto
USA F22 Futures $10,000	August 2	Decatur; USA	Hard	(United States) Sam Warburg	(United States) Trevor Spracklin (United States) Michael Yani
Chile F1A Futures $15,000	August 2	Santiago; Chile	Clay	(Chile) Julio Peralta	(Argentina) Juan-Martín Aranguren (Argentina) Patricio Rudi
Iran F1 Futures $15,000	August 2	Tehran; Iran	Clay	(Sweden) Michael Ryderstedt	(Monaco) Benjamin Balleret (France) Clément Morel
Iran F2 Futures $15,000	August 9	Tehran; Iran	Clay	(Sweden) Michael Ryderstedt	(France) Xavier Audouy (France) Charles Roche
Chile F1B Futures $15,000	August 9	Santiago; Chile	Clay	(Argentina) Cristian Villagrán	(Argentina) Damián Patriarca (Argentina) Patricio Rudi
USA F23 Futures $10,000	August 9	Kenosha; USA	Hard	(United States) Brian Wilson	(United States) Cody Conley (United States) Ryan Newport
Indonesia F2 Futures $10,000	August 9	Makassar; Indonesia	Hard	(South Korea) Chung Hee-seok	(South Korea) Dong-Hyun Kim (South Korea) Kwon Oh-hee
Russia F1 Futures $10,000	August 9	Sergiyev Posad; Russia	Clay	(Russia) Evgueni Smirnov	(Russia) Philipp Mukhometov (Russia) Evgueni Smirnov
Nigeria F3B Futures $10,000	August 9	Lagos; Nigeria	Hard	(Ghana) Henry Adjei-Darko	(Ghana) Henry Adjei-Darko (Nigeria) Jonathan Igbinovia
Italy F20 Futures $10,000	August 9	L'Aquila; Italy	Clay	(France) Mathieu Montcourt	(Italy) Fabio Colangelo (Italy) Federico Torresi
Lithuania F1 Futures $10,000	August 9	Vilnius; Lithuania	Clay	(Spain) Javier García-Sintes	(Poland) Tomasz Bednarek (Spain) Javier García-Sintes
Romania F15 Futures $10,000	August 9	Bucharest; Romania	Clay	(Romania) Victor Ioniță	(Romania) Adrian Barbu (Romania) Victor Ioniță
Serbia & Montenegro F5 Futures $10,000	August 9	Čačak; Serbia & Montenegro	Clay	(Serbia and Montenegro) Novak Djokovic	(Serbia and Montenegro) Novak Djokovic (Serbia and Montenegro) Dejan Petrović
Great Britain F4 Futures $15,000	August 9	Hampstead; Great Britain	Hard	(France) Nicolas Tourte	(United Kingdom) Richard Barker (United Kingdom) William Barker
Spain F18 Futures $15,000	August 9	Vigo; Spain	Clay	(Spain) Israel Matos Gil	(Portugal) Rui Machado (Uruguay) Martín Vilarrubí
Croatia F4 Futures $10,000	August 16	Čakovec; Croatia	Clay	(Croatia) Saša Tuksar	(Croatia) Ivan Cerović (Croatia) Krešimir Ritz
Spain F19 Futures $15,000	August 16	Irun; Spain	Clay	(Croatia) Tomislav Perić	(Spain) Marcel Granollers (Ivory Coast) Valentin Sanon
Netherlands F3 Futures $15,000	August 16	Enschede; Netherlands	Clay	(Slovakia) Ivo Klec	(Netherlands) Jasper Smit (Belgium) Stefan Wauters
Serbia & Montenegro F6 Futures $10,000	August 16	Niš; Serbia & Montenegro	Clay	(Serbia and Montenegro) Viktor Troicki	(Serbia and Montenegro) Nikola Ćirić (Serbia and Montenegro) Goran Tošić
Romania F16 Futures $10,000	August 16	Târgu Mureş; Romania	Clay	(Romania) Victor Ioniță	(Romania) Adrian Barbu (Romania) Victor Ioniță
Lithuania F2 Futures $10,000	August 16	Vilnius; Lithuania	Clay	(Poland) Radosław Nijaki	(Netherlands) Bart Beks (Estonia) Mait Künnap
Russia F2 Futures $10,000	August 16	Krasnoarmeisk; Russia	Hard	(Russia) Philipp Mukhometov	(Russia) Philipp Mukhometov (Russia) Evgueni Smirnov
Indonesia F3 Futures $10,000	August 16	Semarang; Indonesia	Hard	(South Korea) Lee Seung-hoon	(Indonesia) Nesa Arta (Indonesia) Eko Kurniawan
Italy F21 Futures $10,000	August 16	Bolzano; Italy	Clay	(Italy) Massimo Ocera	(Argentina) Máximo González (Italy) Federico Torresi
Brazil F3 Futures $15,000	August 16	Caldas Novas; Brazil	Hard	(Brazil) André Ghem	(Brazil) Daniel Melo (Brazil) Marcelo Melo
Brazil F4 Futures $10,000	August 23	Florianópolis; Brazil	Clay	(Brazil) Marcos Daniel	(Brazil) Marcos Daniel (Brazil) Alexandre Simoni
Italy F22 Futures $10,000	August 23	Rome; Italy	Clay	(United Kingdom) Andy Murray	(Argentina) Máximo González (Italy) Claudio Grassi
Russia F3 Futures $10,000	August 23	Krasnoarmeisk; Russia	Hard	(Russia) Alexander Markin	(Russia) Sergei Demekhine (Russia) Alexander Pavlioutchenkov
Poland F4 Futures $10,000	August 23	Poznań; Poland	Clay	(Poland) Maciej Diłaj	(Poland) Filip Aniola (Poland) Filip Urban
Romania F17 Futures $10,000	August 23	Cluj-Napoca; Romania	Clay	(Romania) Victor Ioniță	(Romania) Adrian Cruciat (Romania) Adrian Gavrilă
Netherlands F4 Futures $15,000	August 23	Alphen aan den Rijn; Netherlands	Clay	(Germany) Andreas Beck	(Brazil) Francisco Costa (Belgium) Jeroen Masson
Spain F20 Futures $15,000	August 23	Santander; Spain	Clay	(Spain) Mariano Albert-Ferrando	(Spain) Marcel Granollers (Ivory Coast) Valentin Sanon
Croatia F5 Futures $10,000	August 23	Zagreb; Croatia	Clay	(Croatia) Ivan Cerović	(Croatia) Luka Kukulic (Croatia) Marko Vukelic
Germany F13 Futures $10,000	August 23	Unterföhring; Germany	Clay	(Poland) Adam Chadaj	(Chile) Felipe Parada (Germany) Jan Weinzierl
Germany F14 Futures $10,000	August 30	Herpersdorf; Germany	Clay	(Switzerland) Michael Lammer	(Kazakhstan) Evgeny Korolev (Italy) Alessandro Motti
Spain F21 Futures $15,000	August 30	Oviedo; Spain	Clay	(Spain) Marc Fornell Mestres	(Spain) Antonio Baldellou-Esteva (Spain) Germán Puentes
Romania F18 Futures $10,000	August 30	Oradea; Romania	Clay	(Romania) Adrian Cruciat	(Romania) Adrian Cruciat (Romania) Adrian Gavrilă
Poland F5 Futures $10,000	August 30	Szczecin; Poland	Clay	(Spain) Javier García-Sintes	(Poland) Tomasz Bednarek (Spain) Javier García-Sintes
Mexico F10 Futures $10,000	August 30	Comitán; Mexico	Hard	(Canada) Andrew Piotrowski	(Israel) Michael Kogan (Mexico) Víctor Romero
Argentina F4 Futures $10,000	August 30	Buenos Aires; Argentina	Clay	(Argentina) Carlos Berlocq	(Argentina) Brian Dabul (Argentina) Damián Patriarca
Ecuador F1 Futures $10,000	August 30	Guayaquil; Ecuador	Clay	(United States) Eric Nunez	(United States) Levar Harper-Griffith (Netherlands) Jean-Julien Rojer
Sri Lanka F1 Futures $10,000	August 30	Colombo; Sri Lanka	Clay	(United States) Chris Kwon	(Chinese Taipei) Tai-Wei Liu (Chinese Taipei) Lee Hsin-han
Italy F23 Futures $10,000	August 30	Chieti; Italy	Clay	(Croatia) Ivan Cerović	(Italy) Daniele Giorgini (Italy) Stefano Mocci
Slovak Rep. F1 Futures $10,000	August 30	Žilina; Slovakia	Clay	(Austria) Rainer Eitzinger	(Slovakia) Tomas Janci (Slovakia) Michal Varsanyi
Brazil F5 Futures $10,000	August 30	Curitiba; Brazil	Clay	(Brazil) Marcos Daniel	(Brazil) Júlio Silva (Brazil) Rogério Dutra Silva
Japan F6 Futures $15,000	August 30	Kashiwa; Japan	Hard	(Japan) Satoshi Iwabuchi	(United States) Minh Le (New Zealand) Mark Nielsen

=== September ===
Tournament	Date	City	Surface	Singles champions	Doubles champions
Japan F7 Futures $15,000	September 6	Tokyo; Japan	Hard	(Japan) Satoshi Iwabuchi	(United States) Minh Le (New Zealand) Mark Nielsen
India F3 Futures $10,000	September 6	Hyderabad; India	Hard	(Pakistan) Aqeel Khan	(India) Mustafa Ghouse (India) Ajay Ramaswami
Brazil F6 Futures $10,000	September 6	Porto Alegre; Brazil	Clay	(Brazil) Marcos Daniel	(Brazil) Thiago Alves (Brazil) Francisco Costa
Hungary F4 Futures $10,000	September 6	Sopron; Hungary	Clay	(Austria) Marco Mirnegg	(Serbia and Montenegro) Nikola Ćirić (Serbia and Montenegro) Goran Tošić
Ecuador F2 Futures $10,000	September 6	Guayaquil; Ecuador	Hard	(Netherlands) Jean-Julien Rojer	(United States) Levar Harper-Griffith (Netherlands) Jean-Julien Rojer
Argentina F5 Futures $10,000	September 6	Buenos Aires; Argentina	Clay	(Argentina) Cristian Villagrán	(Chile) Jorge Aguilar (Chile) Guillermo Hormazábal
Mexico F11 Futures $10,000	September 6	Mexico City; Mexico	Hard	(Mexico) Víctor Romero	(Mexico) Santiago González (Mexico) Miguel Ángel Reyes-Varela
Poland F6 Futures $10,000	September 6	Wrocław; Poland	Clay	(Poland) Filip Urban	(Poland) Marcin Golab (Poland) Krzysztof Kwinta
Spain F22 Futures $10,000	September 6	Madrid; Spain	Hard	(Spain) Tati Rascón	(Netherlands) Romano Frantzen (Netherlands) Floris Kilian
Germany F15 Futures $10,000	September 6	Kempten; Germany	Clay	(Poland) Adam Chadaj	(Chile) Joaquin Lillo (Germany) Armin Meixner
France F13 Futures $15,000	September 6	Bagnères-de-Bigorre; France	Hard	(France) Josselin Ouanna	(France) Xavier Audouy (France) Nicolas Tourte
France F14 Futures $15,000	September 13	Mulhouse; France	Hard (i)	(France) Nicolas Thomann	(United Kingdom) Jonathan Marray (United Kingdom) David Sherwood
Germany F16 Futures $10,000	September 13	Friedberg; Germany	Clay	(Kazakhstan) Evgeny Korolev	(Germany) Tom Dennhardt (Germany) Oliver Markus
Spain F23 Futures $15,000	September 13	Madrid; Spain	Hard	(Spain) Tati Rascón	(Italy) Flavio Cipolla (Italy) Massimo Ocera
Sweden F1 Futures $15,000	September 13	Gothenburg; Sweden	Hard (i)	(Sweden) Jacob Adaktusson	(Netherlands Antilles) Martijn van Haasteren (Netherlands) Boy Wijnmalen
Argentina F6 Futures $10,000	September 13	Buenos Aires; Argentina	Clay	(Argentina) Brian Dabul	(Argentina) Francisco Cabello (Argentina) Diego Junqueira
Ecuador F3 Futures $10,000	September 13	Guayaquil; Ecuador	Hard	(Argentina) Sebastián Decoud	(United States) Trevor Spracklin (United States) Justin Slattery
USA F24 Futures $15,000	September 13	Claremont; USA	Hard	(United States) Bobby Reynolds	(United States) Nick Rainey (United States) Brian Wilson
Italy F24 Futures $15,000	September 13	Porto Torres; Italy	Hard	(Italy) Andrea Stoppini	(Italy) Daniele Giorgini (Italy) Stefano Mocci
India F4 Futures $10,000	September 13	Delhi; India	Hard	(India) Vijay Kannan	(India) Mustafa Ghouse (India) Vishal Uppal
Brazil F7 Futures $10,000	September 20	Fortaleza; Brazil	Hard	(Brazil) Francisco Costa	(Brazil) Eduardo Bohrer (Brazil) Eduardo Portal
Italy F25 Futures $15,000	September 20	Selargius; Italy	Hard	(Italy) Francesco Piccari	(Italy) Daniele Giorgini (Italy) Stefano Mocci
USA F25 Futures $15,000	September 20	Costa Mesa; USA	Hard	(United States) Lesley Joseph	(United States) Scott Lipsky (United States) David Martin
Kenya F1 Futures $10,000	September 20	Mombasa; Kenya	Hard	(South Africa) Roger Anderson	(South Africa) Andrew Anderson (South Africa) Paul Anderson
Bolivia F1 Futures $15,000	September 20	La Paz; Bolivia	Clay	(Colombia) Carlos Salamanca	(Colombia) Michael Quintero (Colombia) Carlos Salamanca
Sweden F2 Futures $15,000	September 20	Gothenburg; Sweden	Hard (i)	(Sweden) Johan Settergren	(Italy) Fabio Colangelo (Italy) Stefano Ianni
Spain F24 Futures $15,000	September 20	Madrid; Spain	Hard	(Spain) Francisco Fogués	(Spain) Marcel Granollers (Togo) Komlavi Loglo
France F15 Futures $15,000	September 20	Plaisir; France	Hard	(France) Julien Varlet	(France) Jean-François Bachelot (France) Jean-Michel Pequery
France F16 Futures $10,000	September 27	Forbach; France	Hard (i)	(Republic of Ireland) Kevin Sorensen	(Germany) Philipp Hammer (Germany) Dominik Meffert
Spain F25 Futures $15,000	September 27	Martos; Spain	Hard	(Spain) Marcel Granollers	(Spain) Miquel Perez Puigdomenech (Spain) Gabriel Trujillo Soler
Great Britain F5 Futures $10,000	September 27	Edinburgh; Great Britain	Hard (i)	(United Kingdom) David Sherwood	(United Kingdom) Richard Bloomfield (United Kingdom) Chris Lewis
Bolivia F2 Futures $15,000	September 27	Santa Cruz; Bolivia	Clay	(Argentina) Cristian Villagrán	(Brazil) Thiago Alves (Brazil) Júlio Silva
Rwanda F1 Futures $10,000	September 27	Kigali; Rwanda	Clay	(South Africa) Andrew Anderson	(Netherlands) Matwé Middelkoop (New Zealand) Adam Thompson
Venezuela F1 Futures $10,000	September 27	Caracas; Venezuela	Hard	(Netherlands) Jean-Julien Rojer	(Netherlands) Jean-Julien Rojer (Brazil) Márcio Torres
USA F26 Futures $15,000	September 27	Irvine; USA	Hard	(Austria) Zbynek Mlynarik	(United States) Brendan Evans (United States) Scott Oudsema
Hungary F5 Futures $10,000	September 27	Budapest; Hungary	Clay	(Spain) Alejandro Vargas-Aboy	(Spain) Antonio Baldellou-Esteva (Spain) Germán Puentes
Brazil F8 Futures $10,000	September 27	Recife; Brazil	Clay (i)	(Brazil) Alessandro Camarço	(Brazil) Diego Cubas (Brazil) Marcelo Melo

=== October ===
Tournament	Date	City	Surface	Singles champions	Doubles champions
Hungary F6 Futures $10,000	October 4	Kaposvár; Hungary	Clay	(Spain) Alejandro Vargas-Aboy	(Slovakia) Tomas Banczi (Slovakia) Peter Miklusicak
France F17 Futures $15,000	October 4	Nevers; France	Hard (i)	(France) Bertrand Contzler	(France) Bertrand Contzler (Algeria) Slimane Saoudi
Georgia F1 Futures $15,000	October 4	Tbilisi; Georgia	Clay	(Poland) Michał Przysiężny	(Netherlands) Bart Beks (Estonia) Mait Künnap
Spain F26 Futures $15,000	October 4	El Ejido; Spain	Hard	(Germany) Tony Holzinger	(Romania) Adrian Cruciat (Spain) Marcel Granollers
Great Britain F6 Futures $10,000	October 4	Glasgow; Great Britain	Hard (i)	(United Kingdom) Richard Bloomfield	(United Kingdom) Dan Kiernan (United Kingdom) David Sherwood
Brazil F9 Futures $10,000	October 4	Guarulhos; Brazil	Clay	(Brazil) Francisco Costa	(Brazil) Diego Cubas (Brazil) Marcelo Melo
Colombia F3 Futures $15,000	October 4	Medellín; Colombia	Clay	(Argentina) Sebastián Decoud	(Brazil) Lucas Engel (Brazil) André Ghem
Nigeria F5 Futures $15,000	October 4	Lagos; Nigeria	Hard	(Pakistan) Aisam-ul-Haq Qureshi	(Togo) Komlavi Loglo (Ivory Coast) Valentin Sanon
USA F27 Futures $15,000	October 4	Laguna Niguel; USA	Hard	(Romania) Horia Tecău	(United States) Mirko Pehar (United States) Jeremy Wurtzman
Venezuela F2 Futures $10,000	October 4	Caracas; Venezuela	Hard	(Netherlands) Jean-Julien Rojer	(France) Vincent Baudat (Jamaica) Ryan Russell
Mexico F12 Futures $10,000	October 4	Torreón; Mexico	Hard	(Poland) Dawid Olejniczak	(Israel) Michael Kogan (Mexico) Víctor Romero
Mexico F13 Futures $10,000	October 11	Monterrey; Mexico	Hard	(Israel) Michael Kogan	(Israel) Michael Kogan (Mexico) Víctor Romero
Venezuela F3 Futures $10,000	October 11	Caracas; Venezuela	Hard	(Netherlands) Jean-Julien Rojer	(United States) Nicholas Monroe (Brazil) Márcio Torres
USA F28 Futures $15,000	October 11	Lubbock; USA	Hard	(South Africa) Justin Bower	(France) Julien Cassaigne (Canada) Philip Gubenco
Nigeria F6 Futures $15,000	October 11	Lagos; Nigeria	Hard	(Germany) Sebastian Fitz	(South Africa) Roger Anderson (Slovenia) Luka Gregorc
Colombia F4 Futures $15,000	October 11	Bogotá; Colombia	Clay	(Poland) Łukasz Kubot	(Mexico) Santiago González (Mexico) Alejandro Hernández
Great Britain F7 Futures $10,000	October 11	Sunderland; Great Britain	Hard (i)	(Germany) Alexander Flock	(United Kingdom) Dan Kiernan (United Kingdom) David Sherwood
Spain F27 Futures $10,000	October 11	Córdoba; Spain	Hard	(Croatia) Tomislav Perić	(Spain) Esteban Carril (Spain) Angel José Martín
Georgia F2 Futures $15,000	October 11	Tbilisi; Georgia	Clay	(Spain) Javier García-Sintes	(Netherlands) Bart Beks (Estonia) Mait Künnap
France F18 Futures $10,000	October 11	Saint-Dizier; France	Hard (i)	(Romania) Florin Mergea	(France) Jean-François Bachelot (Romania) Florin Mergea
France F19 Futures $15,000	October 18	La Roche-sur-Yon; France	Hard (i)	(France) Gilles Simon	(France) Xavier Audouy (France) Jean-François Bachelot
Spain F28 Futures $10,000	October 18	Barcelona; Spain	Clay	(Spain) Antonio Baldellou-Esteva	(Spain) Marc Fornell Mestres (Spain) Mario Munoz-Bejarano
Brazil F10 Futures $10,000	October 18	Campo Grande; Brazil	Clay	(Brazil) Thiago Alves	(Brazil) Lucas Engel (Brazil) André Ghem
Chile F1 Futures $10,000	October 18	Antofagasta; Chile	Clay	(Argentina) Lionel Noviski	(Austria) Oliver Marach (Austria) Marko Neunteibl
USA F29 Futures $15,000	October 18	Arlington; USA	Hard	(South Africa) Justin Bower	(Chinese Taipei) Chen Ti (Japan) Go Soeda
Nigeria F6A Futures $15,000	October 18	Lagos; Nigeria	Hard	(Slovakia) Viktor Bruthans	(South Africa) Raven Klaasen (India) Sunil-Kumar Sipaeya
Cuba F1 Futures $10,000	October 18	Havana; Cuba	Hard	(Netherlands) Jean-Julien Rojer	(Netherlands) Jean-Julien Rojer (Brazil) Márcio Torres
Nigeria F6B Futures $15,000	October 25	Lagos; Nigeria	Hard	(Netherlands) Jasper Smit	(Switzerland) Fabian Roetschi (Switzerland) Benjamin Rufer
Czech Rep. F4 Futures $10,000	October 25	Průhonice; Czech Republic	Hard (i)	(Czech Republic) Martin Štěpánek	(Czech Republic) Daniel Lustig (Czech Republic) Jan Mertl
Mexico F15 Futures $10,000	October 25	Ciudad Obregón; Mexico	Hard	(Mexico) Santiago González	(Mexico) Bruno Echagaray (Mexico) Miguel Gallardo Valles
Thailand F1 Futures $10,000	October 25	Bangkok; Thailand	Hard	(Greece) Konstantinos Economidis	(Greece) Konstantinos Economidis (Greece) Nikos Rovas
USA F30 Futures $15,000	October 25	Baton Rouge; USA	Hard	(South Africa) Justin Bower	(Israel) Michael Kogan (Mexico) Víctor Romero
Brazil F11 Futures $10,000	October 25	Americana; Brazil	Hard	(Brazil) Francisco Costa	(Brazil) Henrique Mello (Brazil) Gabriel Pitta
Spain F29 Futures $10,000	October 25	Vilafranca; Spain	Clay	(Spain) Didac Pérez	(Spain) Gorka Fraile (Spain) David Marrero
France F20 Futures $10,000	October 25	Rodez; France	Hard (i)	(France) Gilles Simon	(Spain) Daniel Muñoz de la Nava (Italy) Alessandro Motti
Belgium F1 Futures $15,000	October 25	Waterloo; Belgium	Carpet (i)	(Belgium) Dominique Coene	(Serbia and Montenegro) Darko Mađarovski (Slovakia) Igor Zelenay
Chile F2 Futures $15,000	October 25	Santiago; Chile	Clay	(Argentina) Mariano Puerta	(Argentina) Máximo González (Argentina) Emiliano Redondi

=== November ===
Tournament	Date	City	Surface	Singles champions	Doubles champions
Belgium F2 Futures $15,000	November 1	Sint-Katelijne-Waver; Belgium	Hard (i)	(Belgium) Jeroen Masson	(Belgium) Jeroen Masson (Belgium) Stefan Wauters
Spain F30 Futures $10,000	November 1	Sant Cugat; Spain	Clay (i)	(Spain) Javier Genaro-Martinez	(Spain) Antonio Baldellou-Esteva (Spain) Germán Puentes
Thailand F2 Futures $10,000	November 1	Bangkok; Thailand	Hard	(Germany) Denis Gremelmayr	(Kuwait) Mohammad Ghareeb (India) Sunil-Kumar Sipaeya
Brazil F12 Futures $10,000	November 1	Campinas; Brazil	Clay	(Brazil) André Ghem	(Brazil) Henrique Mello (Brazil) Gabriel Pitta
Mexico F16 Futures $10,000	November 1	León, Guanajuato; Mexico	Hard	(Mexico) Alejandro Hernández	(Mexico) Daniel Langre (Mexico) Víctor Romero
Czech Rep. F5 Futures $10,000	November 1	Frýdlant nad Ostravicí; Czech Republic	Hard (i)	(Poland) Łukasz Kubot	(Czech Republic) Daniel Lustig (Czech Republic) Jan Mertl
Czech Rep. F6 Futures $10,000	November 8	Hrotovice; Czech Republic	Hard (i)	(Czech Republic) Jakub Hasek	(Czech Republic) Martin Štěpánek (Czech Republic) Jiri Vrbka
Mexico F17 Futures $10,000	November 8	Querétaro; Mexico	Hard	(Mexico) Santiago González	(United States) Nicholas Monroe (United States) Jeremy Wurtzman
Brazil F13 Futures $10,000	November 8	Santos; Brazil	Clay	(Brazil) Thiago Alves	(Brazil) Thiago Alves (Brazil) Thomaz Bellucci
Thailand F3 Futures $10,000	November 8	Pattaya; Thailand	Hard	(South Korea) Kim Young-jun	(United States) David Martin (Netherlands) Matwé Middelkoop
China F1 Futures $10,000	November 8	Jiangmen; China P.R.	Hard	(China) Sun Peng	(Italy) Flavio Cipolla (Italy) Alessandro Motti
USA F31 Futures $15,000	November 8	Waikoloa; USA	Hard	(Romania) Horia Tecău	(United States) Brendan Evans (United States) Scott Oudsema
Chile F3 Futures $15,000	November 8	Santiago; Chile	Clay	(Argentina) Diego Hartfield	(Argentina) Lionel Noviski (Argentina) Damián Patriarca
Australia F3 Futures $15,000	November 15	Berri; Australia	Grass	(Australia) Chris Guccione	(Australia) Mark Hlawaty (Australia) Brad Weston
Spain F31 Futures $15,000	November 15	Gran Canaria; Spain	Clay (i)	(Spain) Frank Cóndor	(Spain) Daniel Muñoz de la Nava (Spain) Carlos Rexach-Itoiz
USA F32 Futures $15,000	November 15	Honolulu; USA	Hard	(United States) Brendan Evans	(United States) Alex Kuznetsov (Romania) Horia Tecău
Tunisia F4 Futures $10,000	November 15	Sfax; Tunisia	Hard	(Serbia and Montenegro) Ilija Bozoljac	(Poland) Maciej Diłaj (Austria) Stefan Wiespeiner
China F2 Futures $10,000	November 15	Guangzhou; China P.R.	Hard	(China) Zhu Benqiang	(Uzbekistan) Murad Inoyatov (Uzbekistan) Denis Istomin
Botswana F1 Futures $10,000	November 15	Gaborone; Botswana	Hard	(South Africa) Kevin Anderson	(South Africa) Kevin Anderson (South Africa) Stephen Mitchell
Brazil F14 Futures $10,000	November 15	Brasília; Brazil	Clay (i)	(Brazil) Thiago Alves	(Brazil) Marcelo Melo (Brazil) Antonio Prieto
Iran F3 Futures $15,000	November 15	Kish Island; Iran	Clay	(Austria) Marco Mirnegg	(Chile) Juan Ignacio Cerda (Netherlands) Jasper Smit
Uruguay F1 Futures $10,000	November 15	Montevideo; Uruguay	Clay	(Argentina) Diego Junqueira	(Chile) Jorge Aguilar (Chile) Felipe Parada
Iran F4 Futures $15,000	November 22	Kish Island; Iran	Clay	(Czech Republic) František Čermák	(Chile) Juan Ignacio Cerda (Netherlands) Jasper Smit
Argentina F7 Futures $10,000	November 22	Rosario, Santa Fe; Argentina	Clay	(Argentina) Máximo González	(Argentina) Patricio Rudi (Argentina) Emiliano Redondi
South Africa F1 Futures $10,000	November 22	Pretoria; South Africa	Hard	(South Africa) Justin Bower	(South Africa) Stephen Mitchell (South Africa) Shaun Rudman
China F3 Futures $10,000	November 22	Jiangmen; China P.R.	Hard	(Netherlands) Melvyn op der Heijde	(Italy) Flavio Cipolla (Italy) Alessandro Motti
Tunisia F5 Futures $10,000	November 22	Monastir; Tunisia	Hard	(Slovenia) Boštjan Ošabnik	(Slovenia) Boštjan Ošabnik (Slovenia) Grega Žemlja
Spain F32 Futures $15,000	November 22	Gran Canaria; Spain	Clay (i)	(Spain) Daniel Muñoz de la Nava	(Spain) David de Miguel (Portugal) Rui Machado
Australia F4 Futures $15,000	November 22	Barmera; Australia	Grass	(Australia) Luke Bourgeois	(Australia) Luke Bourgeois (Australia) Adam Feeney
Tunisia F6 Futures $10,000	November 29	Mégrine; Tunisia	Hard	(Slovenia) Boštjan Ošabnik	(Tunisia) Haythem Abid (Tunisia) Malek Jaziri
Qatar F3 Futures $10,000	November 29	Doha; Qatar	Hard	(Austria) Zbynek Mlynarik	(Russia) Dmitri Sitak (New Zealand) Artem Sitak
South Africa F2 Futures $10,000	November 29	Pretoria; South Africa	Hard	(Czech Republic) Jakub Hasek	(South Africa) Stephen Mitchell (South Africa) Shaun Rudman

=== December ===
Tournament	Date	City	Surface	Singles champions	Doubles champions
Qatar F4 Futures $10,000	December 6	Doha; Qatar	Hard	(Serbia and Montenegro) Alex Vlaški	(Russia) Dmitri Sitak (New Zealand) Artem Sitak
Spain F34 Futures $10,000	December 6	Ourense; Spain	Hard (i)	(United Kingdom) Andy Murray	(Spain) Javier Foronda-Bolanos (Spain) Daniel Monedero
Spain F34A Futures $10,000	December 13	Pontevedra; Spain	Clay (i)	(United Kingdom) Andy Murray	(Romania) Adrian Cruciat (Togo) Komlavi Loglo
Qatar F5 Futures $10,000	December 13	Doha; Qatar	Hard	(Netherlands) Melvyn op der Heijde	(Russia) Dmitri Sitak (New Zealand) Artem Sitak
