= 2004 Davis Cup Americas Zone Group I =

International tennis competition

The Americas Zone was one of the three zones of the regional Davis Cup competition in 2004.

In the Americas Zone there were four different tiers, called groups, in which teams competed against each other to advance to the upper tier. Winners in Group I advanced to the World Group qualifying round, along with losing teams from the World Group first round. Teams who lost their respective ties competed in the relegation play-offs, with winning teams remaining in Group I, whereas teams who lost their play-offs were relegated to the Americas Zone Group II in 2005.

== Participating nations ==
- Brazil
- Chile
- Ecuador
- Paraguay
- Peru
- Venezuela

=== Draw ===
Second Round Play-offs
Brasília, Brazil (clay)
1	Brazil	1
Peru	4

First Round Play-offs
Caracas, Venezuela (hard)
1	Brazil	2
Venezuela	3
Guayaquil, Ecuador (indoor hard)
Peru	1
2	Ecuador	4

First Round
1	Brazil
bye
Caracas, Venezuela (hard)
Venezuela	1
Paraguay	4
Lima, Peru (clay)
Chile	5
Peru	0
bye
2	Ecuador

Second Round
Bahia, Brazil (clay)
1	Brazil	2
Paraguay	3
Viña del Mar, Chile (clay)
Chile	5
2	Ecuador	0

- Brazil relegated to Group II in 2005.
- Chile and Paraguay advance to World Group Play-off.

== First round ==
=== Venezuela vs. Paraguay ===
Venezuela
1
National Tennis Centre, Caracas, Venezuela
6–8 February 2004
Hard

Paraguay
4

			1	2	3	4	5
1	(Venezuela) (Paraguay)	Jimy Szymanski; Ramón Delgado	4; 6	1; 6
2	(Venezuela) (Paraguay)	José de Armas; Francisco Rodríguez	2; 6	6; 2	4; 6	6; 2	6; 1
3	(Venezuela) (Paraguay)	José de Armas / Jimy Szymanski; Paulo Carvallo / Ramón Delgado	6; 3	6^{4} 7^{7}	6; 2	4; 6	3; 6
4	(Venezuela) (Paraguay)	José de Armas; Ramón Delgado	6; 4	6; 1	3; 6	1; 6	4; 6
5	(Venezuela) (Paraguay)	Daniel Vallverdú; Francisco Rodríguez	5; 7	3; 6

=== Peru vs. Chile ===
Peru
0
Estadio Asia, Lima, Peru
6–8 February 2004
Clay

Chile
5

			1	2	3	4	5
1	(Peru) (Chile)	Luis Horna; Fernando González	4; 6	4; 6	1; 6
2	(Peru) (Chile)	Iván Miranda; Nicolás Massú	2; 6	4; 6	3; 6
3	(Peru) (Chile)	Luis Horna / Iván Miranda; Adrián García / Fernando González	2; 6	4; 6	4; 6
4	(Peru) (Chile)	Diego Acuña; Hermes Gamonal	5; 7	3; 6
5	(Peru) (Chile)	Piero Demichelli; Adrián García	2; 6	2; 6

== Second round ==
=== Brazil vs. Paraguay ===
Brazil
2
Costa do Sauípe, Bahia, Brazil
9–11 April 2004
Clay

Paraguay
3

			1	2	3	4	5
1	(Brazil) (Paraguay)	Marcos Daniel; Francisco Rodríguez	4; 6	6; 1	6; 2	4; 6	9; 11
2	(Brazil) (Paraguay)	Júlio Silva; Ramón Delgado	6^{3} 7^{7}	4; 6	1; 6
3	(Brazil) (Paraguay)	Josh Goffi / Alexandre Simoni; Paulo Carvallo / Ramón Delgado	6; 4	4; 6	6; 3	6; 4
4	(Brazil) (Paraguay)	Alexandre Simoni; Ramón Delgado	1; 6	6^{6} 7^{8}	3; 6
5	(Brazil) (Paraguay)	Júlio Silva; Daniel Alejandro López	6; 1	3; 0				retired

=== Chile vs. Ecuador ===
Chile
5
Club Naval de Campo Las Salinas, Viña del Mar, Chile
9–11 April 2004
Clay

Ecuador
0

			1	2	3	4	5
1	(Chile) (Ecuador)	Nicolás Massú; Giovanni Lapentti	6; 3	6; 2	6; 2
2	(Chile) (Ecuador)	Fernando González; Nicolás Lapentti	6; 2	6; 2	6; 4
3	(Chile) (Ecuador)	Fernando González / Nicolás Massú; Giovanni Lapentti / Nicolás Lapentti	6; 1	6; 2	7; 5
4	(Chile) (Ecuador)	Adrián García; Carlos Avellán	6; 1	6; 3
5	(Chile) (Ecuador)	Paul Capdeville; Jhony de Leon	6; 3	6; 3

== First round play-offs ==
=== Venezuela vs. Brazil ===
Venezuela
3
Federación Venezolana de Tenis, Caracas, Venezuela
16–18 July 2004
Hard

Brazil
2

			1	2	3	4	5
1	(Venezuela) (Brazil)	Jimy Szymanski; Diego Cubas	4; 6	6; 0	7^{7} 6^{5}	6; 3
2	(Venezuela) (Brazil)	Kepler Orellana; Bruno Rosa	6; 2	6; 3	6; 4
3	(Venezuela) (Brazil)	Kepler Orellana / Jimy Szymanski; Raony Carvalho / Caio Zampieri	6; 1	6; 2	6; 1
4	(Venezuela) (Brazil)	Jhonnatan Medina-Álvarez; Diego Cubas	5; 7	6^{4} 7^{7}
5	(Venezuela) (Brazil)	Yohny Romero; Caio Zampieri	3; 6	4; 6

=== Ecuador vs. Peru ===
Ecuador
4
Guayaquil, Ecuador
16–18 July 2004
Hard (indoors)

Peru
1

			1	2	3	4	5
1	(Ecuador) (Peru)	Carlos Avellán; Matías Silva	6; 2	6; 4	6; 2
2	(Ecuador) (Peru)	Giovanni Lapentti; Mario-Alberto Cayo	6; 2	6; 0	6; 0
3	(Ecuador) (Peru)	Jhony de Leon / Giovanni Lapentti; Luis-Felipe Bellido / Matías Silva	6; 2	6; 3	6; 1
4	(Ecuador) (Peru)	Jhony de Leon; Matías Silva	3; 6	6; 3	1; 6
5	(Ecuador) (Peru)	Carlos Avellán; Juan-Carlos Rebaza-Lozano	6; 2	6; 0

== Second round play-offs ==
=== Brazil vs. Peru ===
Brazil
1
Academia de Tenis Resort, Brazil
24–26 September 2004
Clay

Peru
4

			1	2	3	4	5
1	(Brazil) (Peru)	Gabriel Pitta; Luis Horna	3; 6	4; 6	4; 6
2	(Brazil) (Peru)	Ronaldo Carvalho; Iván Miranda	6^{6} 7^{8}	7^{8} 6^{6}	6; 4	3; 6	1; 6
3	(Brazil) (Peru)	Ronaldo Carvalho / Gabriel Pitta; Luis Horna / Iván Miranda	2; 6	2; 6	3; 6
4	(Brazil) (Peru)	Alessandro Camarço; Matías Silva	4; 6	6; 3	4; 6
5	(Brazil) (Peru)	Leonardo Kirche; Mauricio Echazú	6; 2	6; 1
