= Javier García-Sintes =

Spanish tennis player (born 1979)

- Country (sports): Spain
- Born: 2 May 1979 (age 46)
- Plays: Right-handed
- Prize money: $47,954

Singles
- Career record: 0–1
- Highest ranking: No. 329 (1 Nov 2004)

Doubles
- Highest ranking: No. 298 (17 Apr 2000)

Javier García-Sintes (born 2 May 1979) is a Spanish former professional tennis player.

García-Sintes reached a career best singles ranking of 329 in the world and qualified for the main draw of the 2001 Campionati Internazionali di Sicilia, an ATP Tour tournament in Palermo. At ATP Challenger level he made three singles quarter-finals. On the ITF Men's Circuit, he won a total of 11 Futures titles, four in singles and seven in doubles.

== ITF Futures titles ==
=== Singles: (4) ===
No.	Date	Tournament	Surface	Opponent	Score
1.	Aug 2003	Poland F2, Sopot	Clay	(Spain) Israel Matos Gil	6–3, 6–2
2.	Aug 2004	Lithuania F1, Vilnius	Clay	(Lithuania) Rolandas Muraška	6–3, 3–6, 6–1
3.	Aug 2004	Poland F5, Szczecin	Clay	(France) Josselin Ouanna	6–2, 6–2
4.	Oct 2004	Georgia F2, Tbilisi	Clay	(Austria) Rainer Eitzinger	6–3, 6–2

=== Doubles: (7) ===
No.	Date	Tournament	Surface	Partner	Opponents	Score
1.	Jun 1999	Italy F11, Valdengo	Clay	(Spain) Carlos Martinez-Comet	(Italy) Massimo Dell'Acqua (Italy) Stefano Tarallo	6–1, 5–7, 6–4
2.	May 2001	Morocco F1, Rabat	Clay	(Spain) Ezequiel Velez-Ortiz	(Morocco) Mounir El Aarej (Morocco) Mehdi Tahiri	5-1, ret
3.	Apr 2003	Spain F8, Jávea	Clay	(Spain) Germán Puentes	(Spain) Ivan Esquerdo-Andreu (Spain) Marcos Jimenez-Letrado	6–7^{(4)}, 6–3, 6–2
4.	Aug 2003	Poland F2 Sopot	Clay	(United Kingdom) Richard Brooks	(Poland) Filip Aniola (Poland) Tomasz Bednarek	7–5, 6–2
5.	Oct 2003	Croatia F8, Novalja	Clay	(Spain) Germán Puentes	(Germany) Sebastian Jaeger (Sweden) Robert Lindstedt	w/o
6.	Aug 2004	Lithuania F1, Vilnius	Clay	(Poland) Tomasz Bednarek	(Estonia) Mait Künnap (Finland) Janne Ojala	6–1, 6–4
7.	Aug 2004	Poland F5, Szczecin	Clay	(Poland) Tomasz Bednarek	(Poland) Filip Aniola (Poland) Filip Urban	6–4, 6–2
