= Maciej Diłaj =

Polish tennis player

- Country (sports): Poland
- Born: 3 August 1979 (age 46) Gdańsk, Poland
- Plays: Right-handed
- Prize money: $31,528

Singles
- Highest ranking: No. 443 (8 Aug 2005)

Doubles
- Career record: 0–2
- Highest ranking: No. 339 (26 Sep 2005)

Maciej Diłaj (born 3 August 1979) is a Polish former professional tennis player.

Hailing from a tennis playing family in Gdańsk, Diłaj's mother Wanda was a national champion in the 1980s. His twin brothers, Pawel and Piotr, were both world-ranked.

Diłaj, who played collegiate tennis for the University of Colorado, featured twice in the doubles main draw at the Idea Prokom Open in Sopot and won 13 ITF Futures titles.

== ITF Futures titles ==
=== Singles: (1) ===
No.	Date	Tournament	Surface	Opponent	Score
1.	Aug 2004	Poland F4, Poznań	Clay	(Czech Republic) David Novak	3–6, 6–3, 7–5

=== Doubles: (12) ===
No.	Date	Tournament	Surface	Partner	Opponents	Score
1.	May 2004	Poland F1, Gdynia	Clay	(Poland) Andrzej Grusiecki	(Latvia) Jānis Skroderis (Latvia) Nikita Svacko	6–1, 6–3
2.	Nov 2004	Tunisia F4, Sfax	Hard	(Austria) Stefan Wiespeiner	(Serbia and Montenegro) Ilija Bozoljac (Serbia and Montenegro) Viktor Troicki	1–6, 6–3, 6–1
3.	May 2005	Poland F1, Gdynia	Clay	(Poland) Dawid Olejniczak	(Poland) Robert Godlewski (Poland) Przemyslaw Stec	6–0, 6–1
4.	May 2005	Poland F2, Kędzierzyn-Koźle	Clay	(Poland) Dawid Olejniczak	(Spain) Jordi Marse-Vidri (Spain) Alberto Soriano-Maldonado	7–6^{(4)}, 6–2
5.	Jun 2005	Poland F3, Koszalin	Clay	(Poland) Dawid Olejniczak	(Poland) Jakub Nijaki (Poland) Filip Urban	7–5, 6–2
6.	Jun 2005	Poland F4, Bytom	Clay	(Poland) Dawid Olejniczak	(Czech Republic) Jakub Hasek (Czech Republic) Josef Neštický	1–0 ret.
7.	Sep 2005	Poland F7, Szczecin	Clay	(Poland) Dawid Olejniczak	(Chile) Felipe Parada (Germany) Benedikt Stronk	6–3, 6–0
8.	Feb 2006	Poland F1, Szczecin	Hard	(Poland) Tomasz Bednarek	(Austria) Martin Fischer (Austria) Philipp Oswald	6–2, 4–6, 6–3
9.	Apr 2006	Italy F11, Padova	Clay	(Australia) Raphael Durek	(Argentina) Guillermo Carry (Italy) Giuseppe Menga	2–6, 6–3, 6–3
10.	Jun 2006	Poland F6, Kraków	Clay	(Australia) Raphael Durek	(Poland) Radosław Nijaki (Poland) Filip Urban	3–6, 6–4, 6–3
11.	Jun 2006	Poland F7, Koszalin	Clay	(Australia) Raphael Durek	(Poland) Radosław Nijaki (Poland) Filip Urban	6–2, 6–2
12.	Sep 2006	Poland F11, Szczecin	Clay	(Australia) Raphael Durek	(Russia) Denis Matsukevitch (Latvia) Deniss Pavlovs	6–3, 4–6, 7–6^{(1)}
