= List of Brazil Davis Cup team representatives =

This is a list of tennis players who have represented the Brazil Davis Cup team in an official Davis Cup match. Brazil have taken part in the competition since 1932.

== Players ==
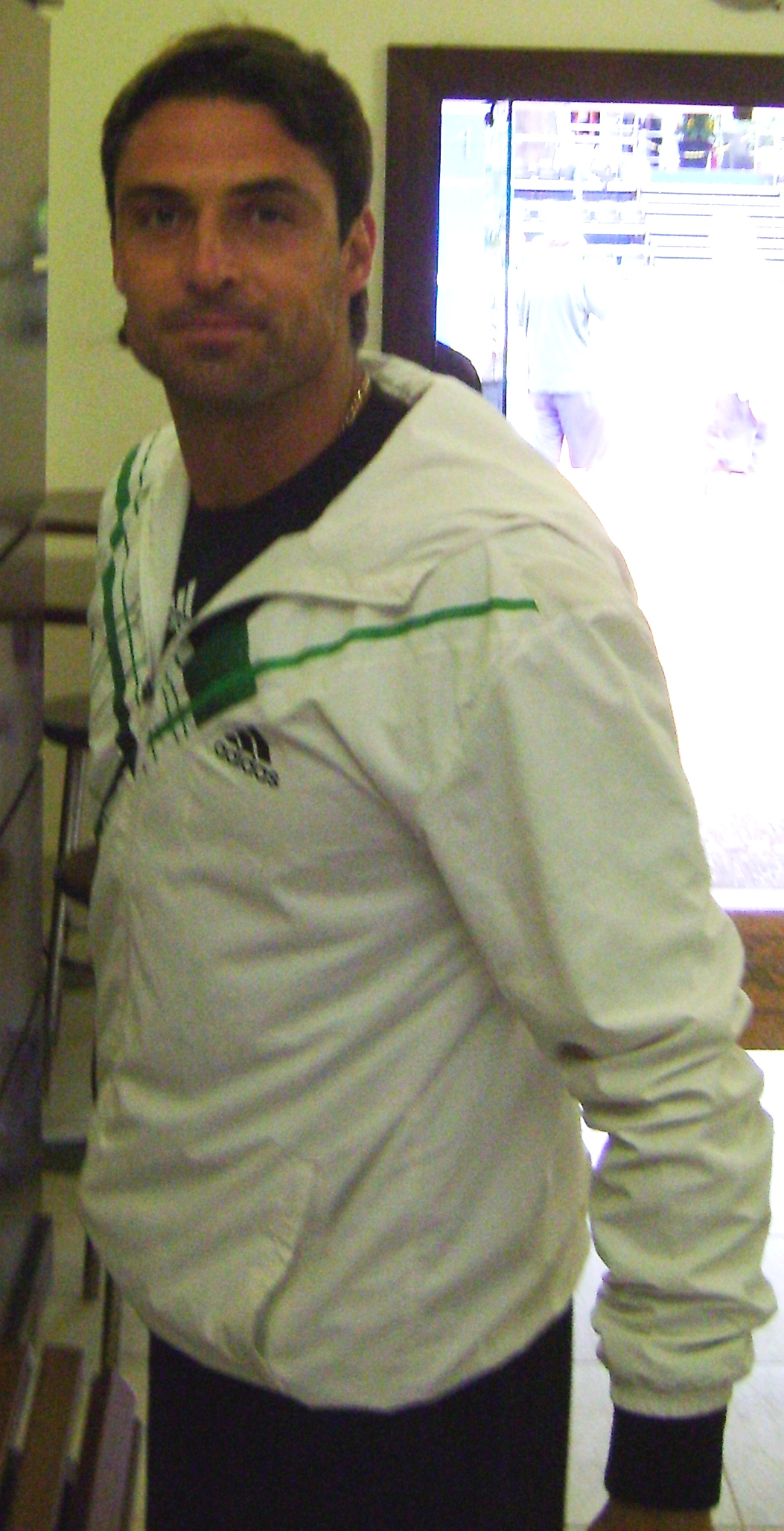
Marcos Daniel

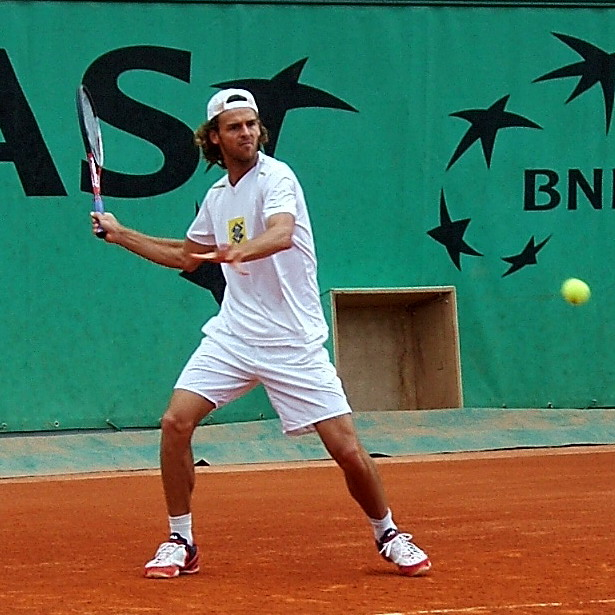
Gustavo Kuerten

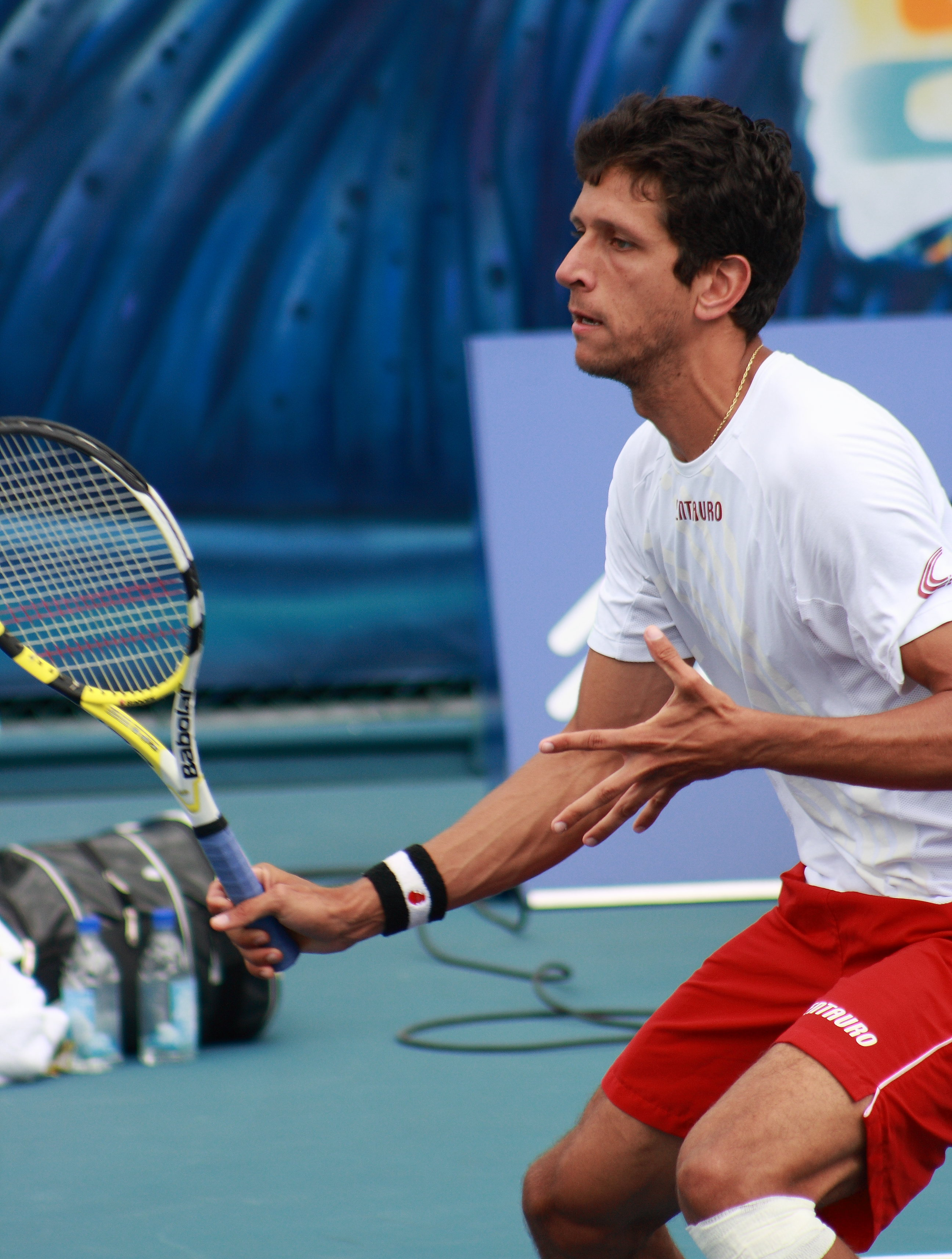
Marcelo Mello

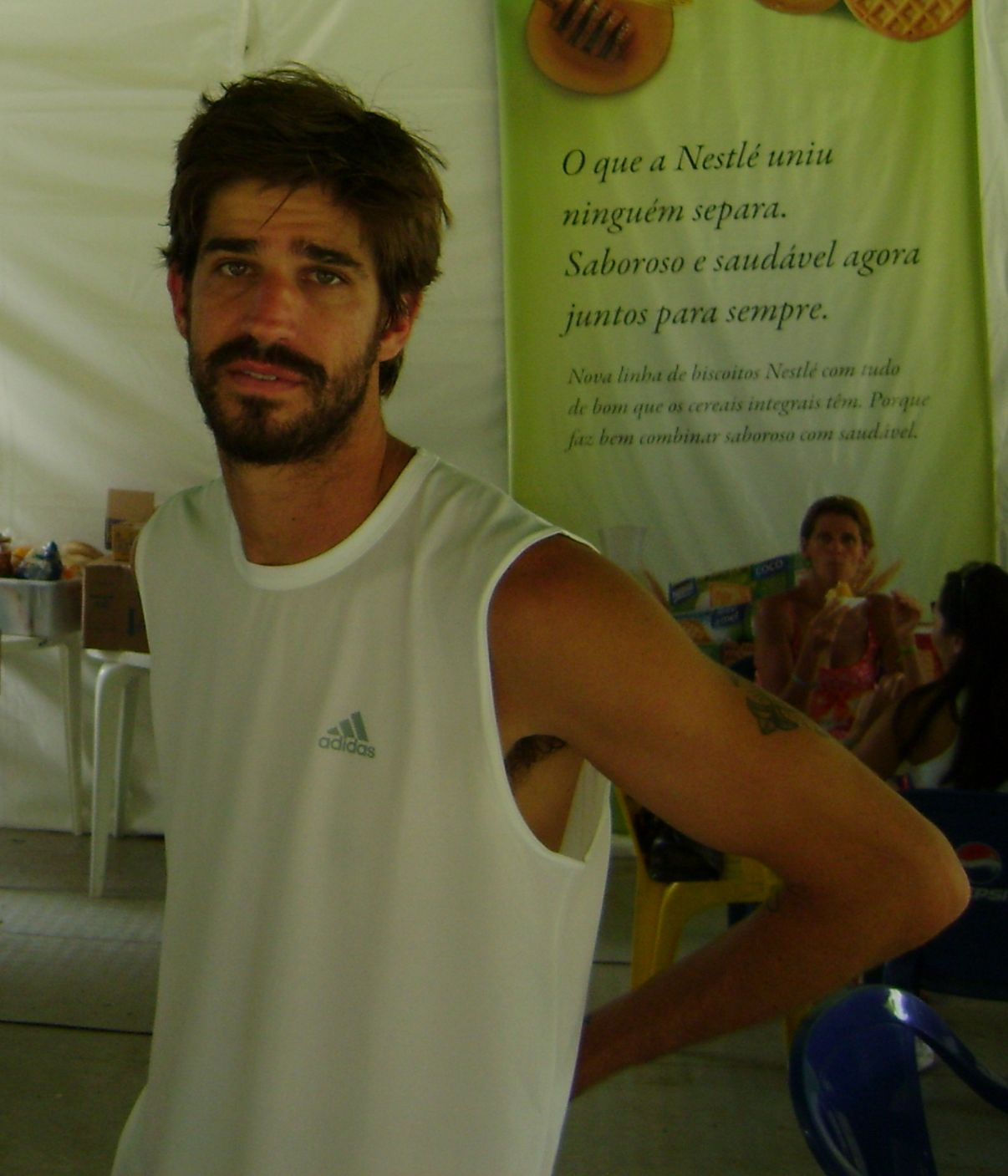
Flávio Saretta

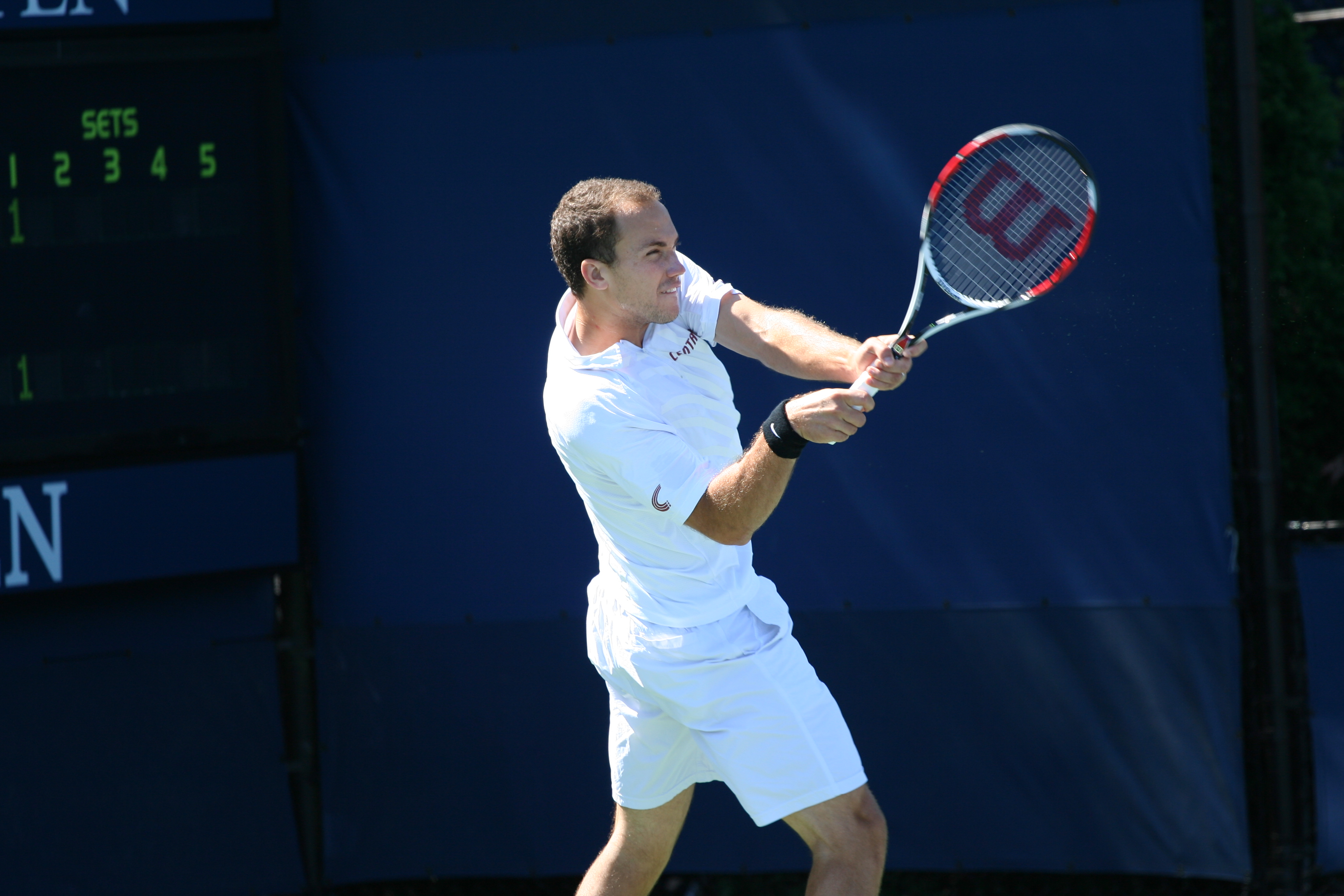
Bruno Soares

Player	W-L (Total)	W-L (Singles)	W-L (Doubles)	Ties	Debut
Ricardo Acioly	1–3	0–0	1–3	4	1987
Nelson Aerts	5–2	3–1	2–1	5	1984
Jose Aguero	2–4	2–4	0–0	5	1955
Thiago Alves	0–2	0–2	0–0	1	2008
Ronald Barnes	16–18	7–13	9–5	14	1958
Thomaz Bellucci	10–7	9–7	1–0	10	2007
Ricardo Bernd	0–1	0–1	0–0	1	1970
Marcos Braga	0–1	0–1	0–0	1	1982
Pedro Bueno-Nete	0–1	0–1	0–0	1	1956
Alessandro Camarço	0–1	0–1	0–0	1	2004
Dácio Campos	4–2	3–2	1–0	3	1985
Silvio Campos	1–1	1–1	0–0	1	1935
Roberto Cardozo	0–2	0–2	0–0	2	1951
Márcio Carlsson	0–1	0–1	0–0	1	1999
Ronaldo Carvalho	0–2	0–1	0–1	1	2004
Raony Carvalho	0–1	0–0	0–1	1	2004
Francisco Costa	1–0	1–0	0–0	1	2000
Nelson Cruz	0–1	0–1	0–0	1	1932
Diego Cubas	1–1	1–1	0–0	1	2004
Marcos Daniel	5–2	4–2	1–0	5	2004
Enrique De Freitas	1–0	0–0	1–0	1	1935
Rogério Dutra Silva	2–0	2–0	0–0	1	2011
Luis-Carlos Enck	0–1	0–1	0–0	1	1976
Robert Falkenburg	3–7	2–4	1–3	4	1954
Carlos-Alberto Fernandes	25–15	16–10	9–5	16	1957
Manoel Fernandes	1–2	1–1	0–1	1	1948
Franco Ferreiro	1–1	1–1	0–0	1	2009
Fernando Gentil	2–0	1–0	1–0	2	1976
Júlio Góes	1–2	1–2	0–0	2	1977
Josh Goffi	1–0	0–0	1–0	1	2004
Fabio Guimarães	0–0	0–0	0–0	1	1954
Marcos Hocevar	7–9	7–8	0–1	10	1978
Ney Keller	2–1	0–0	2–1	3	1979
Leonardo Kirche	1–0	1–0	0–0	1	2004
Carlos Kirmayr	34–22	17–15	17–7	28	1971
Ivan Kley	0–5	0–4	0–1	2	1987
Thomaz Koch	74–44	46–32	28–12	44	1962
Gustavo Kuerten	34–18	21–11	13–7	23	1996
Jorge Lemann	0–2	0–2	0–0	1	1973
José Edison Mandarino	68–42	41–31	27–11	43	1961
Danilo Marcelino	1–3	0–2	1–1	3	1989
Luiz Mattar	20–18	16–15	4–3	20	1986
Fernando Meligeni	13–16	13–16	0–0	19	1993
Ricardo Mello	8–7	8–7	0–0	10	2005
Marcelo Melo	6–2	1–0	5–2	8	2008
Mauro Menezes	1–2	0–1	1–1	2	1990
Ronald Moreira	3–2	2–1	1–1	2	1955
Cássio Motta	28–21	13–16	15–5	27	1979
Edvaldo Oliveira	0–1	0–1	0–0	1	1982
Eduardo Oncins	0–2	0–1	0–1	1	1982
Jaime Oncins	23–14	12–8	11–6	25	1991
Ricardo Pernambuco	0–3	0–2	0–1	1	1932
Ernesto Petersen	0–3	0–2	0–1	1	1948
Gabriel Pitta	0–2	0–1	0–1	1	2004
Alcides Procopio	2–2	1–1	1–1	2	1951
Ivo Ribeiro	0–3	0–3	0–0	2	1958
Fernando Roese	6–9	2–1	4–8	13	1982
Bruno Rosa	0–1	0–1	0–0	1	2004
André Sá	14–10	4–4	10–6	18	1997
Eugenio Saller	0–4	0–2	0–2	2	1952
Flávio Saretta	10–5	9–5	1–0	10	2002
Fabio Silberberg	1–0	1–0	0–0	1	1995
Júlio Silva	1–1	1–1	0–0	1	2004
Ultimo Simone	2–3	1–2	1–1	2	1932
Alexandre Simoni	2–3	0–2	2–1	4	2001
João Soares	1–1	1–1	0–0	2	1979
Bruno Soares	6–1	2–0	4–1	6	2005
Luis-Felipe Tavares	5–7	4–5	1–2	9	1966
Roberto Vaz-Carvalhaes	0–1	0–1	0–0	1	1974
Armando Vieira	13–11	10–5	3–6	9	1951
Caio Zampieri	1–1	1–0	0–1	1	2004
