= Mehdi Tahiri =

Moroccan tennis player

- Country (sports): Morocco
- Born: 28 July 1977 (age 49) Rabat, Morocco
- Height: 1.83 m (6 ft 0 in)
- Turned pro: 1996
- Plays: Right handed
- Prize money: $88,160

Singles
- Career record: 6–21
- Career titles: 0
- Highest ranking: No. 324 (5 November 2001)

Doubles
- Career record: 3–11 (at ATP Tour level, Grand Slam level, and in Davis Cup)
- Career titles: 0
- Highest ranking: No. 401 (4 October 2004)
- Last updated on: 12 May 2022.

Mehdi Tahiri (born 28 July 1977) is a Moroccan retired tennis player. Tahiri represented Morocco in the Davis Cup in several years from 1993 to 2006.

== Junior Grand Slam finals ==
=== Singles: 1 (1 runner-up) ===
Result	Year	Tournament	Surface	Opponent	Score
Loss	1994	US Open	Hard	(Netherlands) Sjeng Schalken	2–6, 6–7

== ATP Challenger and ITF Futures finals ==
=== Singles: 11 (6–5) ===
Legend ATP Challenger (0–0) ITF Futures (6–5)	Finals by surface Hard (0–1) Clay (6–4) Grass (0–0) Carpet (0–0)

Result	W–L	Date	Tournament	Tier	Surface	Opponent	Score
Loss	0–1	Jul 1998	Germany F13, Leun	Futures	Clay	(Germany) Tomas Behrend	3–6, 6–7
Win	1–1	Aug 1998	Egypt F1, Cairo	Futures	Clay	(Lebanon) Jicham Zaatini	1–6, 6–2, 6–1
Win	2–1	Aug 1998	Egypt F3, Cairo	Futures	Clay	(Morocco) Talal Ouahabi	6–1, 6–0
Loss	2–2	Nov 1998	Tunisia F2, Tunis	Futures	Clay	(Spain) Oscar Burrieza-Lopez	2–6, 6–2, 2–6
Loss	2–3	Feb 2001	Mexico F2, Cancun	Futures	Hard	(Venezuela) Jose De Armas	7–6^{(8–6)}, 3–6, 2–6
Win	3–3	May 2001	Morocco F1, Rabat	Futures	Clay	(France) Marc Gicquel	6–1, 3–6, 7–6^{(7–3)}
Win	4–3	Jun 2001	Morocco F2, Marrakesh	Futures	Clay	(Argentina) Roberto Marcelo Alvarez	6–3, 6–2
Loss	4–4	Jun 2003	Morocco F3, Rabat	Futures	Clay	(Argentina) Diego Hipperdinger	2–6, 1–6
Win	5–4	Jul 2004	Morocco F1, Rabat	Futures	Clay	(Slovakia) Jan Stancik	2–6, 6–4, 6–3
Loss	5–5	Aug 2004	Morocco F3, Agadir	Futures	Clay	(France) David Guez	6–7^{(3–7)}, 4–6
Win	6–5	Mar 2006	Morocco F1, Agadir	Futures	Clay	(Morocco) Hicham Arazi	6–2, 1–2 ret.

=== Doubles: 4 (1–3) ===
Legend ATP Challenger (0–0) ITF Futures (1–3)	Finals by surface Hard (0–0) Clay (1–3) Grass (0–0) Carpet (0–0)

Result	W–L	Date	Tournament	Tier	Surface	Partner	Opponents	Score
Loss	0–1	Apr 2001	Algeria F1, Algiers	Futures	Clay	(Morocco) Mounir El Aarej	(Italy) Leonardo Azzaro (Italy) Fabio Maggi	2–6, 2–6
Loss	0–2	May 2001	Morocco F1, Rabat	Futures	Clay	(Morocco) Mounir El Aarej	(Spain) Javier Garcia-Sintes (Spain) Ezequiel Velez-Ortiz	1–5 ret.
Win	1–2	Jun 2001	France F9, Noisy Le Grand	Futures	Clay	(France) Xavier Pujo	(France) Marc Gicquel (France) Anthony Maublanc	6–4, 6–3
Loss	1–3	Aug 2004	Netherlands F3, Enschede	Futures	Clay	(Morocco) Mounir El Aarej	(Netherlands) Jasper Smit (Belgium) Stefan Wauters	4–6, 6–7^{(4–7)}
