= Tomasz Bednarek =

Polish tennis player (born 1981)

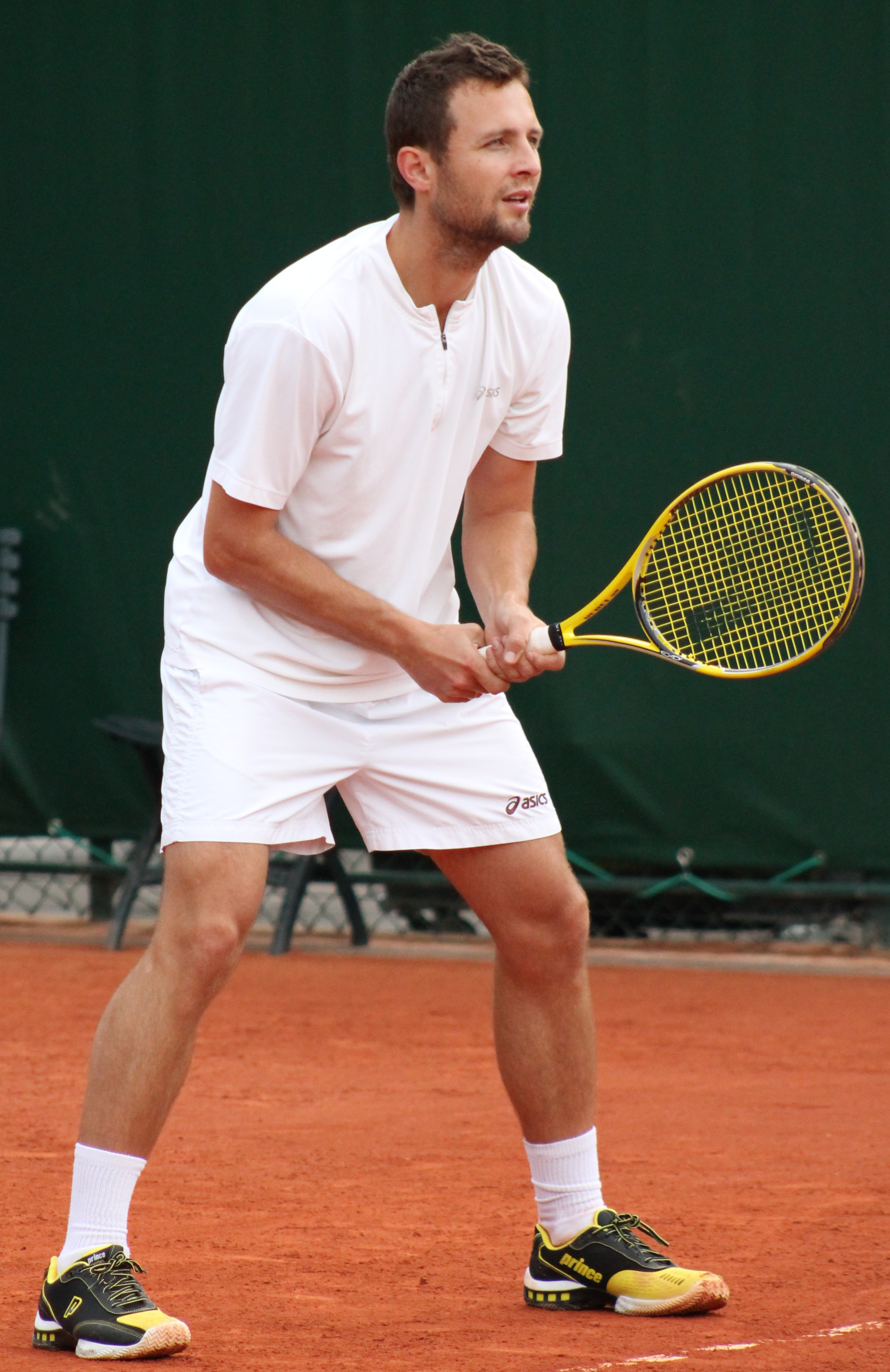
- Tomasz Bednarek playing at Roland Garros 2013
- Country (sports): Poland
- Residence: Wrocław, Poland
- Born: 12 November 1981 (age 44) Pabianice, Poland
- Turned pro: 2000
- Plays: Right-Handed
- Prize money: US$442,317

Singles
- Career record: 0–0
- Career titles: 0
- Highest ranking: No. 724 (8 September 2003)

Doubles
- Career record: 33–64
- Career titles: 0
- Highest ranking: No. 44 (14 April 2014)
- Current ranking: -

Grand Slam doubles results
- Australian Open: 2R (2013)
- French Open: QF (2013)
- Wimbledon: 2R (2013)
- US Open: 1R (2013, 2014, 2015)
- Last updated on: 11 May 2020.

Tomasz Bednarek (Polish pronunciation: [ˈtɔmaʐ bɛˈdnarɛk]; (Note: In isolation, Tomasz is pronounced [ˈtɔmaʂ].) born 12 November 1981) is a professional tennis player from Poland.

== Career ==
He is a doubles' specialist. He reached his career-high doubles ranking of No. 44 on 14 April 2014. His current partner is Mateusz Kowalczyk, but Bednarek partnered among others with his compatriots Maciej Diłaj, Michał Przysiężny and Slovak Filip Polášek and Igor Zelenay. Bednarek partnered with Benoît Paire at the 2014 Wimbledon Championships, where they lost in the first round.

When the former footballer Paolo Maldini and his coach Stefano Landonio made a professional tennis debut, Bednarek and partner David Pel recorded a victory over them in 42 minutes dropping two games during the match.

== ATP career finals ==
=== Doubles: 4 (4 runner-ups) ===
Legend Grand Slam tournaments (0–0) ATP World Tour Finals (0–0) ATP World Tour Masters 1000 (0–0) ATP World Tour 500 Series (0–0) ATP World Tour 250 Series (0–4)	Titles by surface Hard (0–1) Clay (0–3) Grass (0–0)	Titles by setting Outdoor (0–3) Indoor (0–1)

Result	W–L	Date	Tournament	Tier	Surface	Partner	Opponents	Score
Loss	0–1	May 2010	Serbia Open, Serbia	250 Series	Clay	(Poland) Mateusz Kowalczyk	(Mexico) Santiago González (United States) Travis Rettenmaier	6–7^{(6–8)}, 1–6
Loss	0–2	Jul 2013	Stuttgart Open, Germany	250 Series	Clay	(Poland) Mateusz Kowalczyk	(Argentina) Facundo Bagnis (Brazil) Thomaz Bellucci	6–2, 4–6, [9–11]
Loss	0–3	Sep 2013	Thailand Open, Thailand	250 Series	Hard (i)	(Sweden) Johan Brunström	(United Kingdom) Jamie Murray (Australia) John Peers	3–6, 6–3, [6–10]
Loss	0–4	Apr 2014	Grand Prix Hassan II, Morocco	250 Series	Clay	(Czech Republic) Lukáš Dlouhý	(Netherlands) Jean-Julien Rojer (Romania) Horia Tecău	2–6, 2–6

== Challengers and futures titles (20) ==
Legend
Challengers (13)
Futures (7)

No.	Date	Tournament	Surface	Partner	Opponents in the final	Score
1.	12 August 2002	Lithuania F1	Clay	(Poland) Michał Gawłowski	(Germany) Dmitriy Koch (Monaco) Thomas Oger	6–3, 7–6^{(5)}
2.	10 November 2003	Czech F6	Clay	(Czech Republic) Petr Dezort	(Czech Republic) Jan Říha (Czech Republic) Pavel Říha	4–6, 7–5, 6–3
3.	9 August 2004	Lithuania F1	Clay	(Spain) Javier García-Sintes	(Estonia) Mait Künnap (Finland) Janne Ojala	6–1, 6–4
4.	30 August 2004	Poland F5	Clay	(Spain) Javier García-Sintes	(Poland) Filip Anioła (Poland) Filip Urban	6–4, 6–2
5.	15 August 2005	Poland F5	Clay	(Chile) Felipe Parada	(Poland) Maciej Diłaj (Poland) Dawid Olejniczak	6–2, 6–4
6.	20 February 2006	Poland F1	Hard	(Poland) Maciej Diłaj	(Austria) Martin Fischer (Austria) Philipp Oswald	6–2, 4–6, 6–3
7.	10 July 2006	Poznań	Clay	(Poland) Michał Przysiężny	(Greece) Vasilis Mazarakis (Czech Republic) Jan Mertl	6–3, 3–6, [10–8]
8.	7 August 2006	Lithuania F1	Clay	(Latvia) Deniss Pavlovs	(Belarus) Egor Puntus (Belarus) Sergei Tarasevitch	6–0, 6–1
9.	1 October 2007	Mons	Hard	(Slovakia) Filip Polášek	(Germany) Philipp Petzschner (Austria) Alexander Peya	6–2, 5–7, [10–8]
10.	9 June 2008	Košice	Clay	(Slovakia) Igor Zelenay	(Spain) Miguel Ángel López Jaén (Spain) Carles Poch-Gradin	6–1, 4–6, [13–11]
11.	14 September 2009	Szczecin	Clay	(Poland) Mateusz Kowalczyk	(Ukraine) Oleksandr Dolgopolov Jr. (Ukraine) Artem Smirnov	6–3, 6–4
12.	5 October 2009	Tarragona	Clay	(Poland) Mateusz Kowalczyk	(Italy) Flavio Cipolla (Italy) Alessandro Motti	6–1, 6–1
13.	19 October 2009	Florianópolis	Clay	(Poland) Mateusz Kowalczyk	(Spain) Daniel Gimeno-Traver (Spain) Pere Riba	6–1, 6–4
14.	12 April 2010	Rome	Clay	(Poland) Mateusz Kowalczyk	(South Africa) Jeff Coetzee (United States) Jesse Witten	6–4, 7–6^{(4)}
15.	8 October 2011	Palermo	Clay	(Poland) Mateusz Kowalczyk	(Belarus) Alexander Bury (Belarus) Andrei Vasilevski	6–2, 6–4
16.	24 March 2012	Rimouski	Hard	(France) Olivier Charroin	(Germany) Jaan-Frederik Brunken (Germany) Stefan Seifert	6–3, 6–2
17.	17 June 2012	Košice	Clay	(Poland) Mateusz Kowalczyk	(Belarus) Uladzimir Ignatik (Belarus) Andrei Vasilevski	2–6, 7–5, [14–12]
18.	7 July 2012	Braunschweig	Clay	(Poland) Mateusz Kowalczyk	(Finland) Harri Heliövaara (Ukraine) Denys Molchanov	7–5, 6–7^{(1–7)}, [10–8]
19.	7 October 2012	Mons	Hard	(Poland) Jerzy Janowicz	(France) Michaël Llodra (France) Édouard Roger-Vasselin	7–5, 4–6, [10–2]
20.	6 July 2013	Braunschweig	Clay	(Poland) Mateusz Kowalczyk	(Sweden) Andreas Siljeström (Slovakia) Igor Zelenay	6–2, 7–6^{(4)}

== Doubles performance timeline ==
Key
W	F	SF	QF	#R	RR	Q#	DNQ	A	NH

(W) winner; (F) finalist; (SF) semifinalist; (QF) quarterfinalist; (#R) rounds 4, 3, 2, 1; (RR) round-robin stage; (Q#) qualification round; (DNQ) did not qualify; (A) absent; (NH) not held; (SR) strike rate (events won / competed); (W–L) win–loss record.
To avoid confusion and double counting, these charts are updated at the conclusion of a tournament or when the player's participation has ended.

Tournament	2010	2013	2014	2015	SR	W–L
Grand Slam tournaments
Australian Open		2R	1R		0 / 2	1–2
French Open	1R	QF	1R		0 / 3	3–3
Wimbledon	1R	2R	1R		0 / 3	1–3
US Open		1R	1R	1R	0 / 3	0–3
