= Ronaldo Carvalho (tennis) =

Brazilian tennis player

- Country (sports): Brazil
- Born: 28 February 1979 (age 47)
- Plays: Right-handed
- Prize money: $41,771

Singles
- Career record: 0–1 (Davis Cup)
- Highest ranking: No. 362 (11 November 2002)

Doubles
- Career record: 0–1 (Davis Cup)
- Highest ranking: No. 319 (15 September 2003)

Ronaldo Carvalho (born 28 February 1979) is a Brazilian former professional tennis player.

Carvalho, a native of Goiás, reached a career-high singles world ranking of 362 and won two ITF Futures titles. In 2004, he represented Brazil in a Davis Cup tie against Peru in Brasília, losing his singles rubber to Ivan Miranda in five sets. He made the occasional appearance on the ATP Challenger Tour and was a doubles finalist at the Quito Challenger.

== ATP Challenger/ITF Tour finals ==
=== Singles: 4 (2–2) ===
Legend
ITF Futures (2–2)

Result	W–L	Date	Tournament	Tier	Surface	Opponent	Score
Loss	0–1	Nov 2000	Mexico F5, Zacatecas	Futures	Hard	(Hungary) Gergely Kisgyörgy	4–6, 6–7^{(4)}
Win	1–1	Mar 2002	Mexico F3, Aguascalientes	Futures	Clay	(Brazil) Juan Pablo Brzezicki	6–2, 2–6, 6–4
Win	2–1	May 2003	Mexico F4, Aguascalientes	Futures	Hard	(Colombia) Pablo González	6–3, 4–6, 6–2
Loss	2–2	Nov 2003	Mexico F20, León	Futures	Hard	(Brazil) Franco Ferreiro	4–6, 6–3, 6–7^{(4)}

=== Doubles: 13 (3–10) ===
Legend
ATP Challenger (0–1)
ITF Futures (3–9)

Result	W–L	Date	Tournament	Tier	Surface	Partner	Opponents	Score
Win	1–0	Nov 2001	Brazil F10, Aracaju	Futures	Hard	(Brazil) Pedro Braga	(Brazil) Eduardo Bohrer (Brazil) Ricardo Schlachter	6–1, 5–7, 3–1 ret
Win	2–0	Apr 2002	Mexico F4, Guadalajara	Futures	Clay	(Brazil) Henrique Melo	(Mexico) Miguel Gallardo Valles (Mexico) Marcello Amador	7–5, 2–6, 6–4
Loss	0–1	Oct 2002	Quito Challenger, Ecuador	Challenger	Clay	(Brazil) Eduardo Bohrer	(United States) Hugo Armando (Venezuela) Kepler Orellana	2–6, 4–6
Loss	2–1	Oct 2002	Mexico F15, Obregón	Futures	Hard	(Brazil) Pedro Braga	(Argentina) Ignacio González King (Venezuela) José de Armas	7–5, 5–7, 2–6
Loss	2–2	Feb 2003	Brazil F1, São Paulo	Futures	Clay	(Brazil) Ricardo Schlachter	(Brazil) Thiago Alves (Brazil) Bruno Soares	5–7, 4–6
Loss	2–3	Apr 2003	Mexico F2, Aguascalientes	Futures	Clay	(Brazil) Eduardo Bohrer	(Germany) Bernard Parun (Germany) Frank Moser	6–4, 3–6, 6–7^{(1)}
Win	3–3	May 2003	Mexico F3, Guadalajara	Futures	Clay	(Brazil) Eduardo Bohrer	(Argentina) Ignacio González King (Brazil) Bruno Soares	7–6^{(5)}, 7–6^{(9)}
Loss	3–4	May 2003	Mexico F4, Aguascalientes	Futures	Hard	(Brazil) Gabriel Pitta	(Colombia) Alejandro Falla (Brazil) Bruno Soares	6–4, 4–6, 3–6
Loss	3–5	Aug 2003	Brazil F4, Goiânia	Futures	Hard	(Brazil) Pedro Braga	(Brazil) Eduardo Bohrer (Chile) Paul Capdeville	3–6, 4–6
Loss	3–6	Oct 2003	Colombia F1, Medellín	Futures	Clay	(Argentina) Carlos Berlocq	(Bolivia) Javier Taborga (Argentina) Sebastián Decoud	6–7^{(3)}, 6–7^{(4)}
Loss	3–7	Oct 2003	Colombia F2, Bogotá	Futures	Clay	(Argentina) Carlos Berlocq	(Colombia) Alejandro Falla (Colombia) Carlos Salamanca	4–6, 7–5, 4–6
Loss	3–8	Oct 2003	Mexico F18, Obregón	Futures	Hard	(Brazil) Lucas Engel	(Argentina) Gustavo Marcaccio (Mexico) Bruno Echagaray	4–6, 6–3, 5–7
Loss	3–9	Sep 2005	Brazil F8, Fortaleza	Futures	Hard	(Brazil) Alessandro Camarço	(Brazil) Marcelo Melo (Brazil) Antonio Prieto	3–6, 6–7^{(8)}

== See also ==
- List of Brazil Davis Cup team representatives
