= Alessandro Camarço =

Brazilian tennis player

- Full name: Alessandro Carrilho Camarço
- Country (sports): Brazil
- Born: 25 April 1982 (age 42)
- Plays: Right-handed
- Prize money: $33,211

Singles
- Career record: 0–1 (Davis Cup)
- Highest ranking: No. 382 (3 Oct 2005)

Doubles
- Highest ranking: No. 889 (22 Mar 2004)

Alessandro Carrilho Camarço (born 25 April 1982) is a Brazilian former professional tennis player.

Camarço, who comes from the state of Goiás, reached a best singles world ranking of 382 and won four ITF Futures titles. In 2004 he was called into the Brazil Davis Cup team for a tie against Peru in Brasília, following a boycott by the first choice players. He featured in a singles rubber and was beaten in three sets by Matías Silva.

== ITF Futures finals ==
=== Singles: 5 (4–1) ===
Result	W–L	Date	Tournament	Surface	Opponent	Score
Loss	0–1	Jul 2003	Ecuador F3, Villamil	Hard	(Argentina) Sebastián Decoud	3–6, 2–6
Win	1–1	Jun 2004	Mexico F7, Monterrey	Hard	(Argentina) Alejandro Fabbri	6–3, 6–2
Win	2–1	Oct 2004	Brazil F8, Recife	Clay	(Brazil) Marcelo Melo	6–4, 5–7, 6–4
Win	3–1	Sep 2005	Brazil F8, Fortaleza	Hard	(Brazil) Marcelo Melo	6–4, 2–6, 6–1
Win	4–1	Sep 2005	Brazil F9, São Bernardo do Campo	Clay	(Brazil) Lucas Engel	2–6, 6–4, 6–4

=== Doubles: 2 (0–2) ===
Result	W–L	Date	Tournament	Surface	Partner	Opponents	Score
Loss	0–1	Mar 2004	Brazil F2, Caldas Novas	Hard	(Brazil) Leonardo Kirche	(Brazil) Marcelo Melo (Brazil) Bruno Soares	2–6, 3–6
Loss	0–2	Sep 2005	Brazil F8, Fortaleza	Hard	(Brazil) Ronaldo Carvalho	(Brazil) Marcelo Melo (Brazil) Antonio Prieto	3–6, 6–7^{(8)}

== See also ==
- List of Brazil Davis Cup team representatives
