= Radosław Nijaki =

Polish tennis player

- Country (sports): Poland
- Born: 25 January 1982 (age 43)
- Height: 6 ft 4 in (193 cm)
- Plays: Right-handed
- Prize money: $21,668

Singles
- Career record: 0-1 (ATP Tour)
- Highest ranking: No. 581 (30 August 2004)

Doubles
- Career record: 0-1 (ATP Tour)
- Highest ranking: No. 583 (28 August 2006)

Team competitions
- Davis Cup: 3-0
Medal record
Summer Universiade
Bronze medal – third place	2005 İzmir	Doubles

Radosław Nijaki (born 25 January 1982), also known as Radek Nijaki, is a Polish former professional tennis player.

== Tennis career ==
A native of Zielona Góra, Nijaki played Davis Cup for Poland and was a two-time national singles champion.

Nijaki made his Davis Cup debut in a 2000 tie against Estonia and partnered with Marcin Matkowski to win the doubles rubber. In 2002 he featured in the main draw of an ATP Tour tournament in Sopot, the Idea Prokom Open, where he had to retire hurt during his first round match against Paul-Henri Mathieu with an elbow injury. He returned to the Davis Cup team in 2003 for his second and final tie, against Monaco at home in Gdynia. Again partnering Matkowski to a doubles win, he played as well in the reverse singles, beating Guillaume Couillard.

Outside of professional tennis he also played at collegiate level in the United States for Texas Tech University. He was initially with Texas Tech in 2002, before leaving to turn professional, but returned in 2005 and in his sophomore season was named Big 12 Newcomer of the Year. At the 2005 Summer Universiade in İzmir he was a bronze medalist in the doubles event, partnering Filip Urban.

== See also ==
- List of Poland Davis Cup team representatives
