= Gabriel Pitta =

Brazilian tennis player

- Full name: Gabriel Albejante Pitta
- Country (sports): Brazil
- Born: 12 May 1980 (age 44)
- Plays: Right-handed
- Prize money: $37,596

Singles
- Career record: 0–1 (Davis Cup)
- Highest ranking: No. 625 (15 Nov 2004)

Doubles
- Career record: 0–1 (Davis Cup)
- Highest ranking: No. 419 (9 May 2005)

Gabriel Albejante Pitta (born 12 May 1980) is a Brazilian former professional tennis player.

Pitta, a native of Mogi Mirim, São Paulo, had a best singles world ranking of 625 and a career high of 419 in doubles. He won seven ITF Futures doubles titles. In 2004 he participated in a Davis Cup tie against Peru in the midst of a player boycott. The first choice team was unavailable due to a Gustavo Kuerten-led boycott over alleged mismanagement from the head of the Brazilian Tennis Confederation. As a result, Pitta was one of the reserve players called up and faced Peru's best player Luis Horna in singles, losing in three sets. He also played and lost in the doubles rubber.

== ITF Futures finals ==
=== Singles: 3 (0–3) ===
Result	W–L	Date	Tournament	Surface	Opponent	Score
Loss	0–1	Apr 2003	Mexico F1, Naucalpan	Hard	(Mexico) Daniel Garza	6–2, 3–6, 6–7^{(7)}
Loss	0–2	Aug 2005	Brazil F6, Caldas Novas	Hard	(Brazil) Alexandre Simoni	3–6, 2–6
Loss	0–3	Nov 2007	Brazil F23, Campinas	Clay	(Brazil) Daniel Dutra da Silva	2–6, 2–6

=== Doubles: 18 (7–11) ===
Result	W–L	Date	Tournament	Surface	Partner	Opponents	Score
Loss	0–1	Jul 2002	Chile F3, Santiago	Clay	(Argentina) Agustin Tarantino	(Chile) Miguel Miranda (Argentina) Sebastian Uriarte	5–7, 1–6
Loss	0–2	May 2003	Mexico F4, Aguascalientes	Hard	(Brazil) Ronaldo Carvalho	(Colombia) Alejandro Falla (Brazil) Bruno Soares	6–4, 4–6, 3–6
Loss	0–3	Aug 2003	Brazil F3, Porto Alegre	Clay	(Colombia) Pablo González	(Brazil) Eduardo Bohrer (Chile) Paul Capdeville	4–6, 6–7^{(4)}
Win	1–3	May 2004	Mexico F5, Guadalajara	Clay	(Brazil) Marcelo Melo	(Chile) Juan Ignacio Cerda (Netherlands) Jasper Smit	3–6, 6–4, 6–0
Loss	1–4	May 2004	Mexico F6, Celaya	Hard	(Brazil) Marcelo Melo	(Mexico) Bruno Echagaray (Mexico) Jorge Haro	default
Win	2–4	May 2004	Mexico F6A, Coatzacoalcos	Hard	(Brazil) Marcelo Melo	(United States) Matthew Behrmann (United States) Troy Hahn	6–7^{(3)}, 6–4, 6–3
Win	3–4	Oct 2004	Brazil F11, Americana	Hard	(Brazil) Henrique Mello	(Brazil) Eduardo Bohrer (Brazil) Eduardo Portal	6–2, 3–6, 6–4
Win	4–4	Nov 2004	Brazil F12, Campinas	Clay	(Brazil) Henrique Mello	(Brazil) Alexandre Bonatto (Brazil) Henrique Pinto-Silva	7–6^{(4)}, 6–3
Loss	4–5	Mar 2005	Brazil F2, Guarulhos	Clay	(Brazil) Henrique Pinto-Silva	(Brazil) Júlio Silva (Brazil) Rogério Dutra Silva	2–6, 4–6
Win	5–5	May 2006	Brazil F1, Recife	Clay	(Brazil) Rafael Farias	(Brazil) Rogério Dutra Silva (Brazil) Alexandre Simoni	6–1, 6–2
Loss	5–6	Sep 2006	Brazil F9, Itajaí	Clay	(Brazil) Henrique Pinto-Silva	(Brazil) Marcelo Melo (Brazil) André Miele	7–6^{(7)}, 6–7^{(3)}, 1–6
Win	6–6	Sep 2006	Brazil F10, Fortaleza	Clay	(Brazil) Henrique Pinto-Silva	(Brazil) Rafael Farias (Brazil) Ricardo Hocevar	7–6^{(5)}, 6–1
Loss	6–7	Oct 2006	Brazil F16, Porto Alegre	Clay	(Brazil) Henrique Pinto-Silva	(Poland) Kacper Owsian (Poland) Filip Urban	6–3, 5–7, 1–6
Loss	6–8	Nov 2006	Brazil F19, Itu	Clay	(Brazil) Henrique Pinto-Silva	(Brazil) Tiago Lopes (Brazil) Caio Zampieri	6–7^{(4)}, 4–6
Win	7–8	May 2007	Brazil F3, São Paulo	Clay	(Brazil) Henrique Pinto-Silva	(Brazil) André Miele (Brazil) João Souza	6–4, 6–4
Loss	7–9	Sep 2007	Brazil F12, Criciúma	Clay	(Brazil) Henrique Pinto-Silva	(Brazil) Lucas Engel (Brazil) Franco Ferreiro	6–1, 3–6, [8–10]
Loss	7–10	Nov 2007	Brazil F21, São Bernardo do Campo	Clay	(Brazil) Henrique Pinto-Silva	(Ukraine) Dmytro Kamynin (Ukraine) Artem Smirnov	1–6, 4–6
Loss	7–11	Dec 2007	Brazil F25, Fortaleza	Hard	(Brazil) Henrique Pinto-Silva	(Brazil) Andre Pinheiro (Brazil) João Souza	w/o

== See also ==
- List of Brazil Davis Cup team representatives
