= Israel Matos Gil =

Spanish tennis player (born 1982)

- Country (sports): Spain
- Born: 14 December 1982 (age 42)
- Prize money: $33,860

Singles
- Career record: 0–2 (ATP Tour)
- Highest ranking: No. 465 (11 Apr 2005)

Doubles
- Highest ranking: No. 635 (16 Aug 2004)

Israel Matos Gil (born 14 December 1982) is a Spanish former professional tennis player.

Matos Gil, who had a best world ranking of 465, made two ATP Tour main draw appearances at the Valencia Open, including in 2004 when he was beaten in the first round by world number three Juan Carlos Ferrero.

== ITF Futures titles ==
=== Singles: (1) ===
No.	Date	Tournament	Surface	Opponent	Score
1.	Aug 2004	Spain F18, Vigo	Clay	(Spain) Frank Cóndor	6–1, 4–6, 7–6^{(2)}

=== Doubles: (1) ===
No.	Date	Tournament	Surface	Partner	Opponents	Score
1.	Mar 2003	Portugal F6, Carcavelos	Clay	(Spain) Guillermo García López	(Argentina) Diego Junqueira (Chile) Juan-Felipe Yanez	6–4, 6–3
