= Raony Carvalho =

Brazilian tennis player (born 1987)

- Country (sports): Brazil
- Born: 10 April 1987 (age 38); Brasília, Brazil
- Plays: Right-handed
- Prize money: $20,852

Singles
- Highest ranking: No. 815 (24 Oct 2005)

Doubles
- Career record: 0–1 (Davis Cup)
- Highest ranking: No. 554 (6 Feb 2012)

Raony Carvalho (born 10 April 1987), also known as Ray Carvalho, is a Brazilian former professional tennis player.

Born in Brasília, Carvalho was ranked in the top 10 of the ITF junior rankings and made a Davis Cup appearance for Brazil as 17-year-old in 2004. He played the doubles rubber in a tie against Venezuela, which he and partner Caio Zampieri lost to Kepler Orellana and Jimy Szymanski. Before turning professional he played collegiate in the United States tennis for Texas Tech. He won three ITF Futures doubles titles during his career.

Carvalho has a sister, Larissa, who competed on the WTA Tour.

== ITF Futures finals ==
=== Doubles: 8 (3–5) ===
Result	W–L	Date	Tournament	Surface	Partner	Opponents	Score
Loss	0–1	Jun 2006	Brazil F3, Chapecó	Clay	(Brazil) Rodrigo Guidolin	(Brazil) Franco Ferreiro (Uruguay) Martín Vilarrubí	6–3, 3–6, 1–6
Loss	0–2	Sep 2007	Brazil F13, Mogi das Cruzes	Clay	(Brazil) Moacir Santos	(Brazil) Franco Ferreiro (Brazil) Alexandre Simoni	1–6, 4–6
Loss	0–3	Sep 2007	Brazil F14, Sorocaba	Clay	(Brazil) Rodrigo-Antonio Grilli	(Brazil) Fernando Romboli (Brazil) Nicolas Santos	2–6, 6–0, [4–10]
Loss	0–4	Oct 2007	Brazil F16, Porto Alegre	Clay	(Brazil) Lenoir Ramos	(Brazil) Eric Gomes (Brazil) Tiago Lopes	3–6, 6–2, [9–11]
Loss	0–5	Nov 2007	Brazil F20, Itu	Clay	(Brazil) Rodrigo-Antonio Grilli	(Brazil) André Miele (Brazil) João Souza	6–2, 4–6, [7–10]
Win	1–5	Aug 2011	Colombia F4, Medellín	Clay	(Brazil) Fabiano de Paula	(United States) Peter Aarts (New Zealand) Artem Sitak	6–3, 6–3
Win	2–5	Sep 2011	Brazil F31, Recife	Clay	(Brazil) Márcio Torres	(Brazil) Tiago Lopes (Brazil) Diego Matos	2–6, 6–2, [10–7]
Win	3–5	Oct 2011	Brazil F34, Fernandópolis	Clay	(Brazil) Fabrício Neis	(Ecuador) Diego Hidalgo (Brazil) Wilson Leite	6–2, 7–6^{(5)}

== See also ==
- List of Brazil Davis Cup team representatives
