= Diego Cubas =

Brazilian tennis player

- Country (sports): Brazil
- Born: 14 March 1986 (age 39); Joinville, Brazil
- Height: 6 ft (183 cm)
- Plays: Right-handed
- Prize money: $15,487

Singles
- Career record: 1–1 (Davis Cup)
- Highest ranking: No. 699 (8 Nov 2004)

Doubles
- Highest ranking: No. 651 (18 Jul 2005)

Diego Cubas (born 14 March 1986) is a Brazilian former professional tennis player.

Born in Joinville, Cubas was a number one junior in Brazil and represented the country in a 2004 Davis Cup tie against Venezuela in Caracas. He was beaten in the first singles rubber by Jimy Szymanski in four sets but won in the reverse singles against Jhonnatan Medina-Álvarez. During his time on the professional tour he won two ITF Futures titles, both in doubles. He also played collegiate tennis in the United States for the University of South Carolina.

== ITF Futures titles ==
=== Doubles: (2) ===
No.	Date	Tournament	Surface	Partner	Opponents	Score
1.	Oct 2004	Brazil F8, Recife	Clay	(Brazil) Marcelo Melo	(Brazil) Eduardo Bohrer (Brazil) Eduardo Portal	7–6^{(6)}, 6–4
2.	Oct 2004	Brazil F9, Guarulhos	Clay	(Brazil) Marcelo Melo	(Brazil) Eduardo Bohrer (Canada) Pierre-Ludovic Duclos	7–6^{(1)}, 6–4

== See also ==
- List of Brazil Davis Cup team representatives
