= Frank Cóndor =

Spanish tennis player (born 1984)

- Full name: Frank Cóndor-Fernández
- Country (sports): Spain
- Born: 10 January 1984 (age 42) Málaga, Spain
- Plays: Right-handed
- Prize money: $30,659

Singles
- Career record: 0–1 (ATP Tour)
- Highest ranking: No. 325 (25 July 2005)

Doubles
- Highest ranking: No. 574 (11 July 2005)

Frank Cóndor-Fernández (born 10 January 1984) is a Spanish former professional tennis player.

A native of Málaga, Cóndor had a best singles ranking of 325 in the world and won three ITF Futures titles during his career. He made his only ATP Tour main draw appearance as a qualifier at the 2005 Estoril Open.

== ITF Futures titles ==
=== Singles: (3) ===
No.	Date	Tournament	Surface	Opponent	Score
1.	Jul 2004	Morocco F2, Marrakesh	Clay	(Italy) Alessandro Accardo	6–4, 6–3
2.	Nov 2004	Spain F31, Gran Canaria	Clay	(Spain) Daniel Muñoz de la Nava	7–6^{(3)}, 3–6, 6–4
3.	Apr 2006	Spain F12, Lleida	Clay	(Spain) Daniel Monedero-Gonzalez	6–2, 3–6, 6–1
