= Stefan Wauters =

Belgian tennis player

- Full name: Stefan Wauters
- Country (sports): Belgium
- Born: 12 March 1982 (age 44) Sint-Niklaas, Belgium
- Plays: Right-handed
- Prize money: $127,269

Singles
- Career record: 0-1
- Career titles: 0
- Highest ranking: No. 212 (3 April 2006)

Doubles
- Career record: 0-0
- Career titles: 0
- Highest ranking: No. 205 (12 June 2006)

Stefan Wauters (born 12 March 1982) is a former professional tennis player from Belgium.

== Biography ==
Wauters, a right-hander from Sint-Niklaas, was ranked as high as nine in the world as a junior.

As a professional he competed on the Challenger and Futures circuits. He won two Challenger titles, both in doubles. His best singles performance was a runner-up finish at the Saransk Challenger in 2004 and he had a win over Kristof Vliegen, ranked 32 at the time, at the Mons Challenger in 2006. He competed in the qualifying draws of all four Grand Slam tournaments, without ever being able to progress to the main draw. In 2006 he featured in a Davis Cup tie for Belgium, against Ukraine in Kyiv. With Belgium having secured the Group I tie, Wauters was given a run in the fifth rubber, in which he held two match points but lost to Sergei Bubka in a final set tiebreak.

He announced his retirement from professional tennis in 2009.

A former hitting partner for good friend Kim Clijsters, Wauters was also briefly the coach of Yanina Wickmayer, for the second half of 2013.

== Challenger titles ==
=== Doubles: (2) ===
No.	Year	Tournament	Surface	Partner	Opponents	Score
1.	2005	Montauban, France	Clay	(Belgium) Steve Darcis	(Spain) Gabriel Trujillo Soler (Croatia) Lovro Zovko	6–4, 6–7^{(5–7)}, 6–4
2.	2006	Banja Luka, Bosnia & Herzegovina	Clay	(Australia) Joseph Sirianni	(Bosnia and Herzegovina) Ivan Dodig (Bosnia and Herzegovina) Aleksandar Marić	6–4, 3–6, 10–4

== See also ==
- List of Belgium Davis Cup team representatives
