= Lucas Engel =

Brazilian tennis player (born 1981)

- Full name: Lucas Feltes Engel
- Country (sports): Brazil
- Born: 1 December 1981 (age 43)
- Prize money: $75,987

Singles
- Highest ranking: No. 297 (7 May 2007)

Doubles
- Highest ranking: No. 207 (27 Feb 2006)

Lucas Feltes Engel (born 1 December 1981) is a Brazilian former professional tennis player.

A native of Novo Hamburgo, Engel competed in ATP Challenger and ITF Futures events, reaching a career high singles ranking of 297 in the world. He won six Futures singles titles and was a semi-finalist at the 2006 Joinville Challenger, with wins over Ricardo Mello and André Sá. In doubles, Engel was ranked as high as 207 and won the 2007 Florianópolis Challenger, along with 10 Futures tournaments.

In 2020 it was revealed that Engel was undergoing chemotherapy for non-Hodgkin's lymphoma.

Engel's younger brother, Thomás, was a promising junior tennis player who in 2001, at the age of 16, was killed in a police shooting. He was being searched by police at the time and was on his back when he was fired upon. A police lieutenant was convicted of murder.

== ITF Futures titles ==
=== Singles: (6) ===
Legend
ITF Futures (6)

No.	Date	Tournament	Tier	Surface	Opponent	Score
1.	Jun 2003	Mexico F10, Acapulco	Futures	Clay	(Chile) Paul Capdeville	7–6^{(1)}, 7–6^{(5)}
2.	Aug 2005	Brazil F7, Canela	Futures	Clay	(Brazil) André Ghem	7–6^{(7)}, 4–6, 6–4
3.	Sep 2005	Brazil F11, Porto Alegre	Futures	Clay	(Brazil) André Ghem	2–6, 6–2, 6–2
4.	May 2006	Brazil F1, Recife	Futures	Clay	(Brazil) Alexandre Simoni	6–4, 6–1
5.	Aug 2006	Brazil F9, Itajaí	Futures	Clay	(Brazil) Franco Ferreiro	2–6, 6–4, 6–4
6.	Nov 2006	Brazil F20, Criciúma	Futures	Clay	(Brazil) Franco Ferreiro	7–5, 6–2

=== Doubles: (11) ===
Legend
ATP Challenger (1)
ITF Futures (10)

No.	Date	Tournament	Tier	Surface	Partner	Opponents	Score
1.	Apr 2004	Mexico F4, Ciudad Obregón	Futures	Hard	(Brazil) Marcelo Melo	(Chile) Juan Ignacio Cerda (Netherlands) Jasper Smit	7–6^{(4)}, 6–4
2.	May 2004	Colombia F2, Pereira	Futures	Clay	(Brazil) André Ghem	(Brazil) Júlio Silva (Brazil) Rogério Dutra Silva	6–4, 6–3
3.	Oct 2004	Colombia F3, Medellín	Futures	Clay	(Brazil) André Ghem	(Chile) Jorge Aguilar (Chile) Guillermo Hormazábal	7–6^{(2)}, 6–3
4.	Oct 2004	Brazil F10, Campo Grande	Futures	Clay	(Brazil) André Ghem	(Brazil) Júlio Silva (Brazil) Rogério Dutra Silva	6–0, 6–1
5.	Apr 2005	Colombia F3, Cali	Futures	Clay	(Brazil) André Ghem	(Colombia) Pablo González (Colombia) Michael Quintero	6–4, 6–4
6.	May 2005	Brazil F4, Piracicaba	Futures	Clay	(Brazil) André Ghem	(Brazil) Marcelo Melo (Brazil) Alexandre Simoni	6–3, 6–7^{(3)}, 7–6^{(3)}
7.	May 2005	Brazil F5, Florianópolis	Futures	Clay	(Brazil) André Ghem	(Brazil) Rafael Farias (Brazil) Rodrigo Guidolin	6–4, 6–4
8.	Aug 2005	Brazil F7, Canela	Futures	Clay	(Brazil) André Ghem	(Brazil) Alexandre Bonatto (Brazil) Henrique Pinto-Silva	7–5, 6–1
1.	Feb 2007	Florianópolis 1 Challenger, Florianópolis	Challenger	Clay	(Brazil) Márcio Carlsson	(Argentina) Brian Dabul (Argentina) Máximo González	6–4, 2–6, [14–12]
9.	Sep 2007	Brazil F12, Criciúma	Futures	Clay	(Brazil) Franco Ferreiro	(Brazil) Henrique Pinto-Silva (Brazil) Gabriel Pitta	1–6, 6–3, [10–8]
10.	Nov 2007	Brazil F22, Porto Alegre	Futures	Clay	(Italy) Mattia Livraghi	(Brazil) Eric Gomes (Brazil) Tiago Lopes	7–6^{(4)}, 2–6, [10–7]
