= Filip Urban =

Polish tennis player

- Country (sports): Poland
- Residence: Poznań, Poland
- Born: 23 March 1982 (age 42); Wałbrzych, Poland
- Height: 1.93 m (6 ft 4 in)
- Plays: Right-handed (two-handed backhand)
- Prize money: $63,309

Singles
- Career record: 1–3 (at ATP Tour level, Grand Slam level, and in Davis Cup)
- Career titles: 0
- Highest ranking: No. 333 (8 August 2005)

Doubles
- Career record: 4–2 (at ATP Tour level, Grand Slam level, and in Davis Cup)
- Career titles: 1 Challenger, 6 ITF
- Highest ranking: No. 172 (8 August 2005)
- Last updated on: 2 July 2018.

Filip Urban (Polish pronunciation: [ˈfilip ˈurban]; born 23 March 1982) is a former Polish tennis player.

Urban has a career high ATP singles ranking of 333 achieved on 8 August 2005. He also has a career high ATP doubles ranking of 172 achieved on 8 August 2005.

Urban represented Poland at the Davis Cup, where he had a W/L record of 4–1.
