= 2006 Davis Cup Europe/Africa Zone Group III – Zone B =

International tennis competition

The Europe/Africa Zone was one of the three zones of the regional Davis Cup competition in 2006.

In the Europe/Africa Zone there were four different tiers, called groups, in which teams competed against each other to advance to the upper tier. Group III was split into two tournaments. One tournament was held in Teniski Klub 'MLADOST', Banja Luka, Bosnia and Herzegovina, July 19–23, on outdoor clay courts, while the other was held in BTA Centre (Notswane Courts), Gaborone, Botswana, July 26–30, on outdoor hard courts.

== Format ==
The eight teams in the Gaborone tournament were split into two pools and played in a round-robin format. The top two teams of each pool advanced to the promotion pool, from which the two top teams were promoted to the Europe/Africa Zone Group II in 2007. The bottom two teams of each group were placed in the relegation pool, from which the two bottom teams were demoted to the Europe/Africa Zone Group IV in 2007.

== Pool A ==
	Pool A	DEN	NAM	TUN	RWA
1	Denmark (3–0)		3–0	3–0	3–0
2	Namibia (2–1)	0–3		2–1	3–0
3	Tunisia (1–2)	0–3	1–2		3–0
4	Rwanda (0–3)	0–3	0–3	0–3	

=== Denmark vs. Rwanda ===
Denmark
3
BTA Centre (Notswane Courts), Gaborone, Botswana
26 July 2006
Hard

Rwanda
0

			1	2	3
1	(Denmark) (Rwanda)	Rasmus Nørby; Eric Hagenimana	6; 2	6; 1
2	(Denmark) (Rwanda)	Frederik Nielsen; Jean-Claude Gasigwa	6; 0	6; 0
3	(Denmark) (Rwanda)	Jacob Melskens / Martin Pedersen; Alain Hakizimana / Jean-Paul Nshimiyimana	6; 0	6; 0

=== Tunisia vs. Namibia ===
Tunisia
1
BTA Centre (Notswane Courts), Gaborone, Botswana
26 July 2006
Hard

Namibia
2

			1	2	3
1	(Tunisia) (Namibia)	Haythem Abid; Johan Theron	6; 2	6; 3
2	(Tunisia) (Namibia)	Malek Jaziri; Jurgens Strydom	2; 6	2; 6
3	(Tunisia) (Namibia)	Haythem Abid / Hakim Rezgui; Henrico Du Plessis / Jurgens Strydom	6; 4	6^{2} 7^{7}	4; 6

=== Denmark vs. Namibia ===
Denmark
3
BTA Centre (Notswane Courts), Gaborone, Botswana
27 July 2006
Hard

Namibia
0

			1	2	3
1	(Denmark) (Namibia)	Rasmus Nørby; Johan Theron	6; 0	6; 1
2	(Denmark) (Namibia)	Frederik Nielsen; Jurgens Strydom	7; 6	6; 0
3	(Denmark) (Namibia)	Frederik Nielsen / Rasmus Nørby; Henrico Du Plessis / Herman Kuschke	6; 2	3; 0		retired

=== Tunisia vs. Rwanda ===
Tunisia
3
BTA Centre (Notswane Courts), Gaborone, Botswana
27 July 2006
Hard

Rwanda
0

			1	2	3
1	(Tunisia) (Rwanda)	Hakim Rezgui; Eric Hagenimana	6; 0	7; 6
2	(Tunisia) (Rwanda)	Haythem Abid; Jean-Claude Gasigwa	6; 2	6; 2
3	(Tunisia) (Rwanda)	Haythem Abid / Wael Kilani; Alain Hakizimana / Jean-Paul Nshimiyimana	6; 1	6; 0

=== Denmark vs. Tunisia ===
Denmark
3
BTA Centre (Notswane Courts), Gaborone, Botswana
28 July 2006
Hard

Tunisia
0

			1	2	3
1	(Denmark) (Tunisia)	Rasmus Nørby; Hakim Rezgui	6; 4	6; 4
2	(Denmark) (Tunisia)	Frederik Nielsen; Haythem Abid	6; 3	6; 4
3	(Denmark) (Tunisia)	Jacob Melskens / Martin Pedersen; Wael Kilani / Hakim Rezgui	6; 3	6; 3

=== Namibia vs. Rwanda ===
Namibia
3
BTA Centre (Notswane Courts), Gaborone, Botswana
28 July 2006
Hard

Rwanda
0

			1	2	3
1	(Namibia) (Rwanda)	Henrico Du Plessis; Eric Hagenimana	6; 2	5; 7	6; 4
2	(Namibia) (Rwanda)	Jurgens Strydom; Jean-Claude Gasigwa	6; 2	6; 1
3	(Namibia) (Rwanda)	Henrico Du Plessis / Johan Theron; Eric Hagenimana / Alain Hakizimana	6; 7	6; 3	6; 2

== Pool B ==
	Pool B	NGR	GHA	CIV	BOT
1	Nigeria (3–0)		2–1	3–0	3–0
2	Ghana (2–1)	1–2		3–0	2–1
3	Ivory Coast (2–1)	0–3	0–3		3–0
4	Botswana (0–3)	0–3	1–2	0–3	

=== Ivory Coast vs. Botswana ===
Ivory Coast
3
BTA Centre (Notswane Courts), Gaborone, Botswana
26 July 2006
Hard

Botswana
0

			1	2	3
1	(Ivory Coast) (Botswana)	Charles Irie; Bokang Setshogo	6; 4	6; 4
2	(Ivory Coast) (Botswana)	Claude N'Goran; Phenyo Matong	6; 4	6; 1
3	(Ivory Coast) (Botswana)	Terence Nugent / Lavry Sylvain N'Yaba; Onkabetse Matong / Uyapo Nleya	6; 2	6; 3

=== Ghana vs. Nigeria ===
Ghana
1
BTA Centre (Notswane Courts), Gaborone, Botswana
26 July 2006
Hard

Nigeria
2

			1	2	3
1	(Ghana) (Nigeria)	Gunther Darkey; Abdul-Mumin Babalola	6; 4	6; 4
2	(Ghana) (Nigeria)	Henry Adjei-Darko; Jonathan Igbinovia	1; 6	6; 3	3; 6
3	(Ghana) (Nigeria)	Henry Adjei-Darko / Gunther Darkey; Abdul-Mumin Babalola / Jonathan Igbinovia	6^{4} 7^{7}	1; 6

=== Ivory Coast vs. Nigeria ===
Ivory Coast
0
BTA Centre (Notswane Courts), Gaborone, Botswana
27 July 2006
Hard

Nigeria
3

			1	2	3
1	(Ivory Coast) (Nigeria)	Charles Irie; Abdul-Mumin Babalola	6; 7	6; 3	0; 6
2	(Ivory Coast) (Nigeria)	Claude N'Goran; Jonathan Igbinovia	2; 6	4; 6
3	(Ivory Coast) (Nigeria)	Terence Nugent / Lavry Sylvain N'Yaba; Abdul-Mumin Babalola / Jonathan Igbinovia	4; 6	4; 6

=== Ghana vs. Botswana ===
Ghana
2
BTA Centre (Notswane Courts), Gaborone, Botswana
27 July 2006
Hard

Botswana
1

			1	2	3
1	(Ghana) (Botswana)	Gunther Darkey; Bokang Setshogo	0; 5			retired
2	(Ghana) (Botswana)	Mohammed Salifu; Phenyo Matong	6; 7	6; 0	6; 1
3	(Ghana) (Botswana)	Henry Adjei-Darko / Gunther Darkey; Phenyo Matong / Bokang Setshogo	6; 0	6; 0

=== Ivory Coast vs. Ghana ===
Ivory Coast
0
BTA Centre (Notswane Courts), Gaborone, Botswana
28 July 2006
Hard

Ghana
3

			1	2	3
1	(Ivory Coast) (Ghana)	Terence Nugent; Gunther Darkey	1; 6	2; 6
2	(Ivory Coast) (Ghana)	Charles Irie; Henry Adjei-Darko	2; 6	4; 6
3	(Ivory Coast) (Ghana)	Charles Irie / Lavry Sylvain N'Yaba; Henry Adjei-Darko / Gunther Darkey	6; 4	4; 6	5; 7

=== Nigeria vs. Botswana ===
Nigeria
3
BTA Centre (Notswane Courts), Gaborone, Botswana
28 July 2006
Hard

Botswana
0

			1	2	3
1	(Nigeria) (Botswana)	Abdul-Mumin Babalola; Bokang Setshogo	6; 3	6; 3
2	(Nigeria) (Botswana)	Jonathan Igbinovia; Phenyo Matong	6; 3	6; 0
3	(Nigeria) (Botswana)	Sunday Maku / Lawal Shehu; Onkabetse Matong / Uyapo Nleya	6; 3	6; 3

== Promotion pool ==
The top two teams from each of Pools A and B advanced to the Promotion pool. Results and points from games against the opponent from the preliminary round were carried forward.

(scores in italics carried over from Groups)

	1st–4th Play-off	DEN	NGR	GHA	NAM
1	Denmark (3–0)		2–1	3–0	3–0
2	Nigeria (2–1)	1–2		2–1	2–1
3	Ghana (1–2)	0–3	1–2		3–0
4	Namibia (0–3)	0–3	1–2	0–3	

Denmark and Nigeria promoted to Group II in 2007.

=== Denmark vs. Nigeria ===
Denmark
2
BTA Centre (Notswane Courts), Gaborone, Botswana
29 July 2006
Hard

Nigeria
1

			1	2	3
1	(Denmark) (Nigeria)	Rasmus Nørby; Abdul-Mumin Babalola	6; 2	6; 2
2	(Denmark) (Nigeria)	Frederik Nielsen; Jonathan Igbinovia	1; 6	2; 6
3	(Denmark) (Nigeria)	Frederik Nielsen / Rasmus Nørby; Abdul-Mumin Babalola / Jonathan Igbinovia	6; 3	6; 2

=== Namibia vs. Ghana ===
Namibia
0
BTA Centre (Notswane Courts), Gaborone, Botswana
29 July 2006
Hard

Ghana
3

			1	2	3
1	(Namibia) (Ghana)	Henrico Du Plessis; Gunther Darkey	2; 6	2; 6
2	(Namibia) (Ghana)	Jurgens Strydom; Henry Adjei-Darko	3; 6	2; 6
3	(Namibia) (Ghana)	Henrico Du Plessis / Jurgens Strydom; Henry Adjei-Darko / Gunther Darkey	4; 6	2; 6

=== Denmark vs. Ghana ===
Denmark
3
BTA Centre (Notswane Courts), Gaborone, Botswana
30 July 2006
Hard

Ghana
0

			1	2	3
1	(Denmark) (Ghana)	Rasmus Nørby; Gunther Darkey	6; 4	6; 4
2	(Denmark) (Ghana)	Frederik Nielsen; Henry Adjei-Darko	3; 6	6; 3	7; 5
3	(Denmark) (Ghana)	Jacob Melskens / Martin Pedersen; Emmanuel Mensah / Mohammed Salifu	6; 2	6; 1

=== Namibia vs. Nigeria ===
Namibia
1
BTA Centre (Notswane Courts), Gaborone, Botswana
30 July 2006
Hard

Nigeria
2

			1	2	3
1	(Namibia) (Nigeria)	Henrico Du Plessis; Abdul-Mumin Babalola	3; 6	3; 6
2	(Namibia) (Nigeria)	Jurgens Strydom; Jonathan Igbinovia	6^{5} 7^{7}	6; 4	3; 6
3	(Namibia) (Nigeria)	Henrico Du Plessis / Jurgens Strydom; Jonathan Igbinovia / Lawal Shehu	6; 4	7^{7} 6^{2}

== Relegation pool ==
The bottom two teams from Pools A and B were placed in the relegation group. Results and points from games against the opponent from the preliminary round were carried forward.

(scores in italics carried over from Groups)

	5th–8th Play-off	TUN	CIV	BOT	RWA
1	Tunisia (3–0)		2–1	3–0	3–0
2	Ivory Coast (2–1)	1–2		3–0	3–0
3	Botswana (1–2)	0–3	0–3		3–0
4	Rwanda (0–3)	0–3	0–3	0–3	

Botswana and Rwanda relegated to Group IV in 2007.

=== Tunisia vs. Ivory Coast ===
Tunisia
2
BTA Centre (Notswane Courts), Gaborone, Botswana
29 July 2006
Hard

Ivory Coast
1

			1	2	3
1	(Tunisia) (Ivory Coast)	Wael Kilani; Lavry Sylvain N'Yaba	6; 4	6; 2
2	(Tunisia) (Ivory Coast)	Haythem Abid; Charles Irie	6; 4	6; 2
3	(Tunisia) (Ivory Coast)	Haythem Abid / Hakim Rezgui; Claude N'Goran / Terence Nugent	6; 4	2; 6	2; 6

=== Rwanda vs. Botswana ===
Rwanda
0
BTA Centre (Notswane Courts), Gaborone, Botswana
30 July 2006
Hard

Botswana
3

			1	2	3
1	(Rwanda) (Botswana)	Jean-Paul Nshimiyimana; Bokang Setshogo	2; 6	1; 6
2	(Rwanda) (Botswana)	Jean-Claude Gasigwa; Phenyo Matong	6; 3	3; 6	1; 6
3	(Rwanda) (Botswana)	Jean-Claude Gasigwa / Alain Hakizimana; Phenyo Matong / Bokang Setshogo	4; 6	3; 6

=== Tunisia vs. Botswana ===
Tunisia
3
BTA Centre (Notswane Courts), Gaborone, Botswana
30 July 2006
Hard

Botswana
0

			1	2	3
1	(Tunisia) (Botswana)	Wael Kilani; Bokang Setshogo	6; 2	2; 6	6; 4
2	(Tunisia) (Botswana)	Haythem Abid; Phenyo Matong	6; 2	6; 0
3	(Tunisia) (Botswana)	Haythem Abid / Wael Kilani; Phenyo Matong / Uyapo Nleya	6; 2	6; 3

=== Rwanda vs. Ivory Coast ===
Rwanda
0
BTA Centre (Notswane Courts), Gaborone, Botswana
30 July 2006
Hard

Ivory Coast
3

			1	2	3
1	(Rwanda) (Ivory Coast)	Jean-Paul Nshimiyimana; Charles Irie	2; 6	0; 6
2	(Rwanda) (Ivory Coast)	Jean-Claude Gasigwa; Claude N'Goran	2; 6	3; 6
3	(Rwanda) (Ivory Coast)	Alain Hakizimana / Jean-Paul Nshimiyimana; Terence Nugent / Lavry Sylvain N'Yaba	2; 6	3; 6

== Final standings ==
Rank	Team
1	Denmark
2	Nigeria
3	Ghana
4	Namibia
5	Tunisia
6	Ivory Coast
7	Botswana
8	Rwanda

- Denmark and Nigeria promoted to Group II in 2007.
- Botswana and Rwanda relegated to Group IV in 2007.
