= 2008 Davis Cup Europe/Africa Zone Group IV =

International tennis competition

The Europe/Africa Zone was one of the three zones of the regional Davis Cup competition in 2008.

In the Europe/Africa Zone there were four different tiers, called groups, in which teams competed against each other to advance to the upper tier.

== Format ==
Libya, Malta, and Mauritius withdrew from the tournament. They remained in Group IV in 2009. The four remaining teams played in a round-robin format and were all promoted to the Europe/Africa Zone Group III in 2009.

== Draw ==
- Venue: Master Class Tennis and Fitness Club, Yerevan, Armenia (clay)
- Date: 30 April–2 May
- Withdrawn: Libya, Malta and Mauritius

		ISL	NAM	SMR	RWA
1	Iceland (3–0)		3–0	2–1	3–0
2	Namibia (2–1)	0–3		2–1	3–0
3	San Marino (1–2)	1–2	1–2		3–0
4	Rwanda (0–3)	0–3	0–3	0–3	

- Iceland, Namibia, San Marino, and Rwanda promoted to Group III in 2009.

== Results ==
=== San Marino vs. Rwanda ===
San Marino
3
Master Class Tennis and Fitness Club, Yerevan, Armenia
30 April 2008
Clay

Rwanda
0

			1	2	3
1	(San Marino) (Rwanda)	Domenico Vicini; Olivier Nkunda	6; 1	7^{7} 6^{5}
2	(San Marino) (Rwanda)	Diego Zonzini; Jean-Claude Gasigwa	6; 1	7; 5
3	(San Marino) (Rwanda)	William Forcellini / Giacomo Zonzini; Jean-Claude Gasigwa / Dieu-Donne Habiyambere	6; 4	7; 5

=== Iceland vs. Namibia ===
Iceland
3
Master Class Tennis and Fitness Club, Yerevan, Armenia
30 April 2008
Clay

Namibia
0

			1	2	3
1	(Iceland) (Namibia)	Raj-Kumar Bonifacius; Jean Erasmus	2; 6	6; 3	6; 2
2	(Iceland) (Namibia)	Arnar Sigurðsson; Jurgens Strydom	6; 2	6; 3
3	(Iceland) (Namibia)	Andri Jonsson / Arnar Sigurðsson; Jacobus Serdyn / Jurgens Strydom	7^{7} 6^{2}	6; 3

=== San Marino vs. Iceland ===
San Marino
1
Master Class Tennis and Fitness Club, Yerevan, Armenia
1 May 2008
Clay

Iceland
2

			1	2	3
1	(San Marino) (Iceland)	Domenico Vicini; Raj-Kumar Bonifacius	7^{7} 6^{5}	6; 2
2	(San Marino) (Iceland)	Diego Zonzini; Arnar Sigurðsson	2; 6	1; 6
3	(San Marino) (Iceland)	William Forcellini / Domenico Vicini; Andri Jonsson / Arnar Sigurðsson	2; 6	3; 6

=== Namibia vs. Rwanda ===
Namibia
3
Master Class Tennis and Fitness Club, Yerevan, Armenia
1 May 2008
Clay

Rwanda
0

			1	2	3
1	(Namibia) (Rwanda)	Jean Erasmus; Olivier Nkunda	6; 1	6; 2
2	(Namibia) (Rwanda)	Jurgens Strydom; Jean-Claude Gasigwa	6; 3	6; 2
3	(Namibia) (Rwanda)	Jacobus Serdyn / Jurgens Strydom; Jean-Claude Gasigwa / Dieu-Donne Habiyambere	6; 0	6; 3

=== San Marino vs. Namibia ===
San Marino
1
Master Class Tennis and Fitness Club, Yerevan, Armenia
2 May 2008
Clay

Namibia
2

			1	2	3
1	(San Marino) (Namibia)	Domenico Vicini; Jean Erasmus	0; 6	2; 6
2	(San Marino) (Namibia)	Diego Zonzini; Jurgens Strydom	2; 5			retired
3	(San Marino) (Namibia)	William Forcellini / Domenico Vicini; Jean Erasmus / Jacobus Serdyn	6; 2	6; 4

=== Iceland vs. Rwanda ===
Iceland
3
Master Class Tennis and Fitness Club, Yerevan, Armenia
2 May 2008
Clay

Rwanda
0

			1	2	3
1	(Iceland) (Rwanda)	Raj-Kumar Bonifacius; Dieu-Donne Habiyambere	6; 0	6; 0
2	(Iceland) (Rwanda)	Arnar Sigurðsson; Jean-Claude Gasigwa	6; 1	6; 1
3	(Iceland) (Rwanda)	Magnús Gunnarsson / Andri Jonsson; Dieu-Donne Habiyambere / Olivier Nkunda	6^{7} 7^{9}	7^{7} 6^{5}	7^{7} 6^{2}
