= 2013 Davis Cup Africa Zone Group III =

International tennis competition

The Africa Zone was one of the four zones within Group 3 of the regional Davis Cup competition in 2013. The zone's competition was held in round robin format in Smash Tennis Academy, Cairo, Egypt, May 15–18, on outdoor clay courts. The thirteen competing nations were divided into four pools of three or four teams. The winners from each pool played off to determine the two nations to be promoted to Europe/Africa Zone Group II in 2014, while the second and third placed nations played to off to determine overall placings within the group. The fourth-placed team in Pool D does not enter the play-offs.

== Draw ==
Pool A

	Morocco	Algeria	Cameroon	RR W–L	Matches W–L	Sets W–L	Games W–L	Standings
Morocco		3–0	3–0	2–0	6–0	12–0	72–15	1
Algeria	0–3		2–1	1–1	2–4	4–9	41–63	2
Cameroon	0–3	1–2		0–2	1–5	3–10	35–70	3

Pool B

	Zimbabwe	Ghana	Kenya	RR W–L	Matches W–L	Sets W–L	Games W–L	Standings
Zimbabwe		3–0	3–0	2–0	6–0	12–0	72–27	1
Ghana	0–3		3–0	1–1	3–3	6–6	50–58	2
Kenya	0–3	0–3		0–2	0–6	0–12	37–74	3

Pool C

	Madagascar	Namibia	Rwanda	RR W–L	Matches W–L	Sets W–L	Games W–L	Standings
Madagascar		3–0	3–0	2–0	6–0	12–0	73–26	1
Namibia	0–3		3–0	1–1	3–3	6–7	55–59	2
Rwanda	0–3	0–3		0–2	0–6	1–12	34–77	3

Pool D

	Egypt	Nigeria	Botswana	Zambia	RR W–L	Matches W–L	Sets W–L	Games W–L	Standings
Egypt		3–0	3–0	3–0	3–0	9–0	18–1	111–30	1
Nigeria	0–3		2–1	3–0	2–1	5–4	12–9	101–86	2
Botswana	0–3	1–2		3–0	1–2	4–5	8–13	66–106	3
Zambia	0–3	0–3	0–3		0–3	0–9	3–18	63–119	4

== First round ==
=== Pool A ===
==== Morocco vs. Algeria ====
Morocco
3
Smash Tennis Academy, Cairo, Egypt
15 May 2013
Clay

Algeria
0

			1	2	3
1	(Morocco) (Algeria)	Hicham Khaddari; Mohamed Hassan	6; 0	6; 2
2	(Morocco) (Algeria)	Mehdi Ziadi; Mohamed Amine Kerroum	6; 1	6; 2
3	(Morocco) (Algeria)	Yassine Idmbarek / Younès Rachidi; Nazim Makhlouf / Hichem Yasri	6; 1	6; 1

==== Algeria vs. Cameroon ====
Algeria
2
Smash Tennis Academy, Cairo, Egypt
16 May 2013
Clay

Cameroon
1

			1	2	3
1	(Algeria) (Cameroon)	Hichem Yasri; Germain Ayinda	6; 3	6; 2
2	(Algeria) (Cameroon)	Mohamed Amine Kerroum; Étienne Teboh	6; 3	3; 6	6; 1
3	(Algeria) (Cameroon)	Mohamed Hassan / Nazim Makhlouf; Augustin Ntouba / Étienne Teboh	3; 6	4; 6

==== Morocco vs. Cameroon ====
Morocco
3
Smash Tennis Academy, Cairo, Egypt
17 May 2013
Clay

Cameroon
0

			1	2	3
1	(Morocco) (Cameroon)	Yassine Idmbarek; Pierre Ndjock	6; 0	6; 1
2	(Morocco) (Cameroon)	Hicham Khaddari; Augustin Ntouba	6; 1	6; 2
3	(Morocco) (Cameroon)	Younès Rachidi / Mehdi Ziadi; Augustin Ntouba / Étienne Teboh	6; 1	6; 3

=== Pool B ===
==== Zimbabwe vs. Kenya ====
Zimbabwe
3
Smash Tennis Academy, Cairo, Egypt
15 May 2013
Clay

Kenya
0

			1	2	3
1	(Zimbabwe) (Kenya)	Tinotenda Chanakira; Ibrahim Kibet Yego	6; 1	6; 1
2	(Zimbabwe) (Kenya)	Mark Fynn; Mohammed Fazal Khan	6; 2	6; 3
3	(Zimbabwe) (Kenya)	Martin Dzuwa / Takanyi Garanganga; Kevin Cheruiyot / Ibrahim Kibet Yego	6; 4	6; 4

==== Zimbabwe vs. Ghana ====
Zimbabwe
3
Smash Tennis Academy, Cairo, Egypt
16 May 2013
Clay

Ghana
0

			1	2	3
1	(Zimbabwe) (Ghana)	Mark Fynn; Albert Arthur	6; 3	6; 3
2	(Zimbabwe) (Ghana)	Takanyi Garanganga; Emmanuel Mensah	6; 0	6; 2
3	(Zimbabwe) (Ghana)	Mark Fynn / Takanyi Garanganga; Robert Mensah Kpodo / Emmanuel Mensah	6; 2	6; 2

==== Ghana vs. Kenya ====
Ghana
3
Smash Tennis Academy, Cairo, Egypt
17 May 2013
Clay

Kenya
0

			1	2	3
1	(Ghana) (Kenya)	Robert Mensah Kpodo; Jamin Luvembe Esikumo	6; 3	7^{7} 6^{4}
2	(Ghana) (Kenya)	Emmanuel Mensah; Mohammed Fazal Khan	6; 3	6; 2
3	(Ghana) (Kenya)	Albert Arthur / George Darko; Kevin Cheruiyot / Ibrahim Kibet Yego	6; 2	7^{7} 6^{5}

=== Pool C ===
==== Namibia vs. Rwanda ====
Namibia
3
Smash Tennis Academy, Cairo, Egypt
15 May 2013
Clay

Rwanda
0

			1	2	3
1	(Namibia) (Rwanda)	Jacobus Serdyn; Dieu-Donne Habiyambere	6; 3	6; 3
2	(Namibia) (Rwanda)	Tukhula Jacobs; Jean-Claude Gasigwa	6; 1	6; 3
3	(Namibia) (Rwanda)	Tukhula Jacobs / Jacobus Serdyn; Jean-Claude Gasigwa / Dieu-Donne Habiyambere	5; 7	6; 4	6; 1

==== Madagascar vs. Rwanda ====
Madagascar
3
Smash Tennis Academy, Cairo, Egypt
16 May 2013
Clay

Rwanda
0

			1	2	3
1	(Madagascar) (Rwanda)	Jean-Jacques Rakotohasy; Dieu-Donne Habiyambere	6; 4	6; 0
2	(Madagascar) (Rwanda)	Antso Rakotondramanga; Jean-Claude Gasigwa	6; 1	6; 3
3	(Madagascar) (Rwanda)	Tony Rajaobelina / Ando Rasolomalala; Hamissi Gatete / Mubaraka Harerimana	6; 2	6; 2

==== Madagascar vs. Namibia ====
Madagascar
3
Smash Tennis Academy, Cairo, Egypt
17 May 2013
Clay

Namibia
0

			1	2	3
1	(Madagascar) (Namibia)	Jean-Jacques Rakotohasy; Jacobus Serdyn	6; 3	6; 0
2	(Madagascar) (Namibia)	Antso Rakotondramanga; Tukhula Jacobs	7^{7} 6^{3}	6; 3
3	(Madagascar) (Namibia)	Tony Rajaobelina / Ando Rasolomalala; Tukhula Jacobs / Gideon van Dyk	6; 1	6; 1

=== Pool D ===
==== Egypt vs. Zambia ====
Egypt
3
Smash Tennis Academy, Cairo, Egypt
15 May 2013
Clay

Zambia
0

			1	2	3
1	(Egypt) (Zambia)	Karim-Mohamed Maamoun; Nkumbu Chonya	6; 0	6; 2
2	(Egypt) (Zambia)	Mohamed Safwat; Edgar Kazembe	6; 3	6; 1
3	(Egypt) (Zambia)	Karim Hossam / Sherif Sabry; Henry Banda / Kombe Mabo	6; 0	6; 0

==== Nigeria vs. Botswana ====
Nigeria
2
Smash Tennis Academy, Cairo, Egypt
15 May 2013
Clay

Botswana
1

			1	2	3
1	(Nigeria) (Botswana)	Clifford Enosoregbe; Shingirai Muzondiwa	6; 2	6; 0
2	(Nigeria) (Botswana)	Henry Atseye; Phenyo Matong	4; 6	6; 2	4; 6
3	(Nigeria) (Botswana)	Abdul-Mumin Babalola / Lawal Shehu; Phenyo Matong / Shingirai Muzondiwa	6; 3	6; 3

==== Egypt vs. Botswana ====
Egypt
3
Smash Tennis Academy, Cairo, Egypt
16 May 2013
Clay

Botswana
0

			1	2	3
1	(Egypt) (Botswana)	Sherif Sabry; Shingirai Muzondiwa	6; 0	6; 0
2	(Egypt) (Botswana)	Mohamed Safwat; Phenyo Matong	6; 1	6; 0
3	(Egypt) (Botswana)	Karim Hossam / Karim-Mohamed Maamoun; Innocent Tidimane / Shingirai Muzondiwa	6; 1	6; 1

==== Nigeria vs. Zambia ====
Nigeria
3
Smash Tennis Academy, Cairo, Egypt
16 May 2013
Clay

Zambia
0

			1	2	3
1	(Nigeria) (Zambia)	Clifford Enosoregbe; Nkumbu Chonya	6; 1	6; 3
2	(Nigeria) (Zambia)	Henry Atseye; Edgar Kazembe	6; 4	6; 4
3	(Nigeria) (Zambia)	Abdul-Mumin Babalola / Lawal Shehu; Nkumbu Chonya / Edgar Kazembe	7; 5	5; 7	6; 1

==== Egypt vs. Nigeria ====
Egypt
3
Smash Tennis Academy, Cairo, Egypt
17 May 2013
Clay

Nigeria
0

			1	2	3
1	(Egypt) (Nigeria)	Sherif Sabry; Abdul-Mumin Babalola	6; 2	6; 1
2	(Egypt) (Nigeria)	Mohamed Safwat; Clifford Enosoregbe	6; 4	6; 2
3	(Egypt) (Nigeria)	Karim Hossam / Karim-Mohamed Maamoun; Abdul-Mumin Babalola / Lawal Shehu	6; 3	3; 6	6; 3

==== Botswana vs. Zambia ====
Botswana
3
Smash Tennis Academy, Cairo, Egypt
17 May 2013
Clay

Zambia
0

			1	2	3
1	(Botswana) (Zambia)	Shingirai Muzondiwa; Kombe Mabo	1; 6	6; 1	6; 3
2	(Botswana) (Zambia)	Phenyo Matong; Edgar Kazembe	6; 4	7; 5
3	(Botswana) (Zambia)	Phenyo Matong / Shingirai Muzondiwa; Henry Banda / Edgar Kazembe	3; 6	6; 3	6; 4

== Play-offs ==
=== Promotion ===
==== Morocco vs. Madagascar ====
Morocco
2
Smash Tennis Academy, Cairo, Egypt
18 May 2013
Clay

Madagascar
1

			1	2	3
1	(Morocco) (Madagascar)	Yassine Idmbarek; Jean-Jacques Rakotohasy	6; 2	7; 5
2	(Morocco) (Madagascar)	Hicham Khaddari; Antso Rakotondramanga	6; 3	6^{3} 7^{7}	3; 6
3	(Morocco) (Madagascar)	Younès Rachidi / Mehdi Ziadi; Tony Rajaobelina / Antso Rakotondramanga	6; 3	6; 2

==== Zimbabwe vs. Egypt ====
Zimbabwe
1
Smash Tennis Academy, Cairo, Egypt
18 May 2013
Clay

Egypt
2

			1	2	3
1	(Zimbabwe) (Egypt)	Mark Fynn; Sherif Sabry	2; 6	2; 6
2	(Zimbabwe) (Egypt)	Takanyi Garanganga; Mohamed Safwat	6; 4	6^{5} 7^{7}	6; 4
3	(Zimbabwe) (Egypt)	Mark Fynn / Takanyi Garanganga; Sherif Sabry / Mohamed Safwat	3; 6	5; 7

=== 5th to 8th play-offs ===
==== Algeria vs. Namibia ====
Algeria
2
Smash Tennis Academy, Cairo, Egypt
18 May 2013
Clay

Namibia
1

			1	2	3
1	(Algeria) (Namibia)	Mohamed Hassan; Jacobus Serdyn	6; 4	6; 3
2	(Algeria) (Namibia)	Mohamed Amine Kerroum; Tukhula Jacobs	3; 6	4; 6
3	(Algeria) (Namibia)	Mohamed Amine Kerroum / Hichem Yasri; Tukhula Jacobs / Jacobus Serdyn	6; 3	2; 6	6; 2

==== Ghana vs. Nigeria ====
Ghana
2
Smash Tennis Academy, Cairo, Egypt
18 May 2013
Clay

Nigeria
1

			1	2	3
1	(Ghana) (Nigeria)	Albert Arthur; Lawal Shehu	4; 6	6^{5} 7^{7}
2	(Ghana) (Nigeria)	Emmanuel Mensah; Clifford Enosoregbe	6; 3	6; 3
3	(Ghana) (Nigeria)	Albert Arthur / Emmanuel Mensah; Henry Atseye / Lawal Shehu	6; 2			retired

=== 9th to 12th play-offs ===
==== Cameroon vs. Rwanda ====
Cameroon
3
Smash Tennis Academy, Cairo, Egypt
18 May 2013
Clay

Rwanda
0

			1	2	3
1	(Cameroon) (Rwanda)	Augustin Ntouba; Dieu-Donne Habiyambere	6; 4	3; 6	6; 3
2	(Cameroon) (Rwanda)	Étienne Teboh; Jean-Claude Gasigwa	6; 1	7; 5
3	(Cameroon) (Rwanda)	Germain Ayinda / Pierre Ndjock; Hamissi Gatete / Mubaraka Harerimana	6; 3	6; 4

==== Kenya vs. Botswana ====
Kenya
1
Smash Tennis Academy, Cairo, Egypt
18 May 2013
Clay

Botswana
2

			1	2	3
1	(Kenya) (Botswana)	Ibrahim Kibet Yego; Shingirai Muzondiwa	1; 6	7; 5	2; 6
2	(Kenya) (Botswana)	Mohammed Fazal Khan; Phenyo Matong	3; 6	4; 6
3	(Kenya) (Botswana)	Kevin Cheruiyot / Ibrahim Kibet Yego; Shingirai Muzondiwa / Innocent Tidimane	6; 3	7^{7} 6^{5}

== Final standings ==
Rank	Team
1	Egypt
1	Morocco
3	Madagascar
3	Zimbabwe
5	Algeria
5	Ghana
7	Namibia
7	Nigeria
9	Botswana
9	Cameroon
11	Kenya
11	Rwanda
13	Zambia

- Egypt and Morocco promoted to Group II in 2014.
