= 2003 Davis Cup Europe/Africa Zone Group IV – Zone B =

International tennis competition

The Europe/Africa Zone was one of the three zones of the regional Davis Cup competition in 2003.

In the Europe/Africa Zone there were four different tiers, called groups, in which teams competed against each other to advance to the upper tier. Group IV was split into two tournaments. One tournament was held in National Centre, Lagos, Nigeria, February 5–9, on outdoor hard courts, while the other was held in Centro Tennis di Fonte dell'Ovo, San Marino, June 11–15, on outdoor clay courts.

== Format ==
The seven teams in the San Marino tournament were split into two groups and played in a round-robin format. The top two teams of each group advanced to the promotion pool, from which the two top teams were promoted to the Europe/Africa Zone Group III in 2004. The remaining teams in each group from the preliminary round were placed in a second pool to determine places 5–7.

== Pool A ==
	Pool A	SMR	RWA	ZAM	MRI
1	San Marino (3–0)		3–0	3–0	3–0
2	Rwanda (2–1)	0–3		2–1	3–0
3	Zambia (1–2)	0–3	1–2		2–1
4	Mauritius (0–3)	0–3	0–3	1–2	

=== San Marino vs. Zambia ===
San Marino
3
Centro Tennis di Fonte dell'Ovo, San Marino
11 June 2003
Clay

Zambia
0

			1	2	3
1	(San Marino) (Zambia)	Christian Rosti; Edgar Kazembe	6; 3	6; 3
2	(San Marino) (Zambia)	Domenico Vicini; Hector Sando	6; 3	6; 2
3	(San Marino) (Zambia)	William Forcellini / Massimiliano Rosti; Edgar Kazembe / Hector Sando	6; 4	4; 6	6; 2

=== Mauritius vs. Rwanda ===
Mauritius
0
Centro Tennis di Fonte dell'Ovo, San Marino
11 June 2003
Clay

Rwanda
3

			1	2	3
1	(Mauritius) (Rwanda)	Alexandre Daruty; Eric Hagenimana	1; 6	2; 6
2	(Mauritius) (Rwanda)	Simon Koenig; Jean-Claude Gasigwa	2; 6	3; 6
3	(Mauritius) (Rwanda)	Alexandre Daruty / Simon Koenig; Jean-Claude Gasigwa / Eric Hagenimana	3; 6	2; 6

=== San Marino vs. Mauritius ===
San Marino
3
Centro Tennis di Fonte dell'Ovo, San Marino
12 June 2003
Clay

Mauritius
0

			1	2	3
1	(San Marino) (Mauritius)	Massimiliano Rosti; Alexandre Daruty	6; 1	6; 0
2	(San Marino) (Mauritius)	Domenico Vicini; Simon Koenig	6; 3	6; 1
3	(San Marino) (Mauritius)	William Forcellini / Christian Rosti; Alexandre Daruty / Abdullah Toorawa	7^{7} 6^{2}	6; 0

=== Zambia vs. Rwanda ===
Zambia
1
Centro Tennis di Fonte dell'Ovo, San Marino
12 June 2003
Clay

Rwanda
2

			1	2	3
1	(Zambia) (Rwanda)	Edgar Kazembe; Eric Hagenimana	4; 6	6; 2	2; 6
2	(Zambia) (Rwanda)	Hector Sando; Jean-Claude Gasigwa	6; 4	1; 6	6; 1
3	(Zambia) (Rwanda)	Edgar Kazembe / Hector Sando; Jean-Claude Gasigwa / Eric Hagenimana	5; 7	6^{6} 7^{8}

=== San Marino vs. Rwanda ===
San Marino
3
Centro Tennis di Fonte dell'Ovo, San Marino
13 June 2003
Clay

Rwanda
0

			1	2	3
1	(San Marino) (Rwanda)	Massimiliano Rosti; Eric Hagenimana	6; 4	6; 4
2	(San Marino) (Rwanda)	Domenico Vicini; Jean-Claude Gasigwa	6; 1	6; 0
3	(San Marino) (Rwanda)	William Forcellini / Christian Rosti; Jean-Claude Gasigwa / Eric Hagenimana	6; 4	6; 4

=== Mauritius vs. Zambia ===
Mauritius
1
Centro Tennis di Fonte dell'Ovo, San Marino
13 June 2003
Clay

Zambia
2

			1	2	3
1	(Mauritius) (Zambia)	Alexandre Daruty; Edgar Kazembe	6; 1	6; 0
2	(Mauritius) (Zambia)	Simon Koenig; Hector Sando	2; 6	6; 2	3; 6
3	(Mauritius) (Zambia)	Alexandre Daruty / Abdullah Toorawa; Edgar Kazembe / Hector Sando	5; 7	1; 6

== Pool B ==
	Pool B	ISL	KEN	MLT
1	Iceland (2–0)		3–0	3–0
2	Kenya (1–1)	0–3		3–0
3	Malta (0–2)	0–3	0–3	

=== Iceland vs. Kenya ===
Iceland
3
Centro Tennis di Fonte dell'Ovo, San Marino
11 June 2003
Clay

Kenya
0

			1	2	3
1	(Iceland) (Kenya)	Raj-Kumar Bonifacius; Norbert Oduor	6; 3	6^{5} 7^{7}	6; 4
2	(Iceland) (Kenya)	Arnar Sigurðsson; Allan Cooper	6; 3	6; 3
3	(Iceland) (Kenya)	Davíð Halldórsson / Arnar Sigurðsson; Allan Cooper / Norbert Oduor	7^{8} 6^{6}	6; 3

=== Iceland vs. Malta ===
Iceland
3
Centro Tennis di Fonte dell'Ovo, San Marino
12 June 2003
Clay

Malta
0

			1	2	3
1	(Iceland) (Malta)	Raj-Kumar Bonifacius; Mark Schembri	6; 4	2; 6	6; 4
2	(Iceland) (Malta)	Arnar Sigurðsson; Mark Vella	6; 1	6; 0
3	(Iceland) (Malta)	Davíð Halldórsson / Arnar Sigurðsson; Marcus Delicata / Mark Schembri	6; 1	6; 1

=== Malta vs. Kenya ===
Malta
0
Centro Tennis di Fonte dell'Ovo, San Marino
13 June 2003
Clay

Kenya
3

			1	2	3
1	(Malta) (Kenya)	Marcus Delicata; Norbert Oduor	6^{4} 7^{7}	3; 6
2	(Malta) (Kenya)	Mark Schembri; Allan Cooper	5; 7	3; 6
3	(Malta) (Kenya)	Marcus Delicata / Mark Vella; Arun Balaraman / Willis Mbandi	3; 6	6^{3} 7^{7}

== Promotion pool ==
The top two teams from each of Pools A and B advanced to the Promotion pool. Results and points from games against the opponent from the preliminary round were carried forward.

(scores in italics carried over from Groups)

	1st–4th Play-off	ISL	KEN	SMR	RWA
1	Iceland (3–0)		3–0	2–1	3–0
2	Kenya (2–1)	0–3		2–1	2–1
3	San Marino (1–2)	1–2	1–2		3–0
4	Rwanda (0–3)	0–3	1–2	0–3	

Iceland and Kenya promoted to Group III for 2004.

=== San Marino vs. Kenya ===
San Marino
1
Centro Tennis di Fonte dell'Ovo, San Marino
14 June 2003
Clay

Kenya
2

			1	2	3
1	(San Marino) (Kenya)	Massimiliano Rosti; Norbert Oduor	2; 6	6; 1	1; 6
2	(San Marino) (Kenya)	Domenico Vicini; Allan Cooper	5; 7	6; 3	3; 6
3	(San Marino) (Kenya)	Christian Rosti / Domenico Vicini; Arun Balaraman / Willis Mbandi	6; 4	6; 3

=== Rwanda vs. Iceland ===
Rwanda
0
Centro Tennis di Fonte dell'Ovo, San Marino
14 June 2003
Clay

Iceland
3

			1	2	3
1	(Rwanda) (Iceland)	Eric Hagenimana; Raj-Kumar Bonifacius	1; 6	3; 6
2	(Rwanda) (Iceland)	Jean-Claude Gasigwa; Arnar Sigurðsson	2; 6	2; 6
3	(Rwanda) (Iceland)	Jean-Claude Gasigwa / Eric Hagenimana; Davíð Halldórsson / Arnar Sigurðsson	1; 6	4; 6

=== San Marino vs. Iceland ===
San Marino
1
Centro Tennis di Fonte dell'Ovo, San Marino
15 June 2003
Clay

Iceland
2

			1	2	3
1	(San Marino) (Iceland)	Christian Rosti; Andri Jonsson	6; 2	6; 1
2	(San Marino) (Iceland)	Domenico Vicini; Arnar Sigurðsson	1; 6	5; 7
3	(San Marino) (Iceland)	Christian Rosti / Domenico Vicini; Davíð Halldórsson / Arnar Sigurðsson	2; 6	6^{5} 7^{7}

=== Rwanda vs. Kenya ===
Rwanda
1
Centro Tennis di Fonte dell'Ovo, San Marino
15 June 2003
Clay

Kenya
2

			1	2	3
1	(Rwanda) (Kenya)	Eric Hagenimana; Norbert Oduor	6; 3	7^{7} 6^{3}
2	(Rwanda) (Kenya)	Jean-Claude Gasigwa; Allan Cooper	1; 6	4; 6
3	(Rwanda) (Kenya)	Jean-Claude Gasigwa / Eric Hagenimana; Allan Cooper / Norbert Oduor	4; 6	6; 3	4; 6

== Placement pool ==
The bottom two teams from Pool A and the bottom team from Pool B were placed in the placement pool to determine places 5–7. Results and points from games against the opponent from the preliminary round were carried forward.

(scores in italics carried over from Groups)

	5th–7th Play-off	MLT	ZAM	MRI
1	Malta (2–0)		3–0	2–1
2	Zambia (1–1)	0–3		2–1
3	Mauritius (0–2)	1–2	1–2	

=== Zambia vs. Malta ===
Zambia
0
Centro Tennis di Fonte dell'Ovo, San Marino
14 June 2003
Clay

Malta
3

			1	2	3
1	(Zambia) (Malta)	Mwiza Gondwe; Marcus Delicata	0; 6	4; 6
2	(Zambia) (Malta)	Edgar Kazembe; Mark Schembri	3; 6	0; 6
3	(Zambia) (Malta)	Mwiza Gondwe / Hector Sando; Marcus Delicata / Mark Schembri	1; 6	2; 6

=== Mauritius vs. Malta ===
Mauritius
1
Centro Tennis di Fonte dell'Ovo, San Marino
15 June 2003
Clay

Malta
2

			1	2	3
1	(Mauritius) (Malta)	Alexandre Daruty; Marcus Delicata	6; 3	6; 4
2	(Mauritius) (Malta)	Simon Koenig; Mark Schembri	5; 7	4; 6
3	(Mauritius) (Malta)	Alexandre Daruty / Abdullah Toorawa; Marcus Delicata / Mark Schembri	2; 6	6^{6} 7^{8}

== Final standings ==
Rank	Team
1	Iceland
2	Kenya
3	San Marino
4	Rwanda
5	Malta
6	Zambia
7	Mauritius

- Iceland and Kenya promoted to Group III in 2004.
