= 2007 Davis Cup Europe/Africa Zone Group IV =

International tennis competition

The Europe/Africa Zone was one of the three zones of the regional Davis Cup competition in 2007.

In the Europe/Africa Zone there were four different tiers, called groups, in which teams competed against each other to advance to the upper tier.

== Format ==
Azerbaijan, Benin, Gabon, Libya, Malta, Senegal, and Uganda withdrew from the tournament. They remained in Group IV in 2008. The five remaining teams played in a round-robin format. The top four teams were promoted to the Europe/Africa Zone Group III in 2008. The bottom team remained in Group IV.

== Draw ==
- Venue: Master Class Tennis and Fitness Club, Yerevan, Armenia (clay)
- Date: 8–12 August
- Withdrawn: Azerbaijan, Benin, Gabon, Libya, Malta, Senegal, and Uganda

	Group IV	MNE	ARM	BOT	AND	RWA
1	Montenegro (4–0)		3–0	3–0	3–0	3–0
2	Armenia (3–1)	0–3		2–1	2–1	2–1
3	Botswana (2–2)	0–3	1–2		2–1	2–1
4	Andorra (1–3)	0–3	1–2	1–2		3–0
5	Rwanda (0–4)	0–3	1–2	1–2	0–3	

- Montenegro, Armenia, Botswana, and Andorra promoted to Group III in 2008.

== Results ==
=== Armenia vs. Rwanda ===
Armenia
2
Master Class Tennis and Fitness Club, Yerevan, Armenia
8 August 2007
Clay

Rwanda
1

			1	2	3
1	(Armenia) (Rwanda)	Harutyun Sofyan; Eric Hagenimana	6; 0	6; 3
2	(Armenia) (Rwanda)	Hayk Zohranyan; Jean-Claude Gasigwa	3; 6	2; 6
3	(Armenia) (Rwanda)	Harutyun Sofyan / Hayk Zohranyan; Jean-Claude Gasigwa / Eric Hagenimana	6; 2	6; 2

=== Botswana vs. Montenegro ===
Botswana
0
Master Class Tennis and Fitness Club, Yerevan, Armenia
8 August 2007
Clay

Montenegro
3

			1	2	3
1	(Botswana) (Montenegro)	Bokang Setshogo; Daniel Danilović	5; 7	2; 6
2	(Botswana) (Montenegro)	Phenyo Matong; Goran Tošić	0; 6	0; 6
3	(Botswana) (Montenegro)	Onkabetse Matong / Bokang Setshogo; Marko Begović / Nemanja Kontić	0; 6	1; 6

=== Andorra vs. Armenia ===
Andorra
1
Master Class Tennis and Fitness Club, Yerevan, Armenia
9 August 2007
Clay

Armenia
2

			1	2	3
1	(Andorra) (Armenia)	Pau Gerbaud-Farras; Ashot Gevorgyan	0; 6	6; 3	6; 2
2	(Andorra) (Armenia)	Jean-Baptiste Poux-Gautier; Harutyun Sofyan	4; 6	0; 2		retired
3	(Andorra) (Armenia)	Jordi Vila-Vila / Pau Gerbaud-Farras; Harutyun Sofyan / Hayk Zohranyan	7; 5	5; 7	6; 8

=== Montenegro vs. Rwanda ===
Montenegro
3
Master Class Tennis and Fitness Club, Yerevan, Armenia
9 August 2007
Clay

Rwanda
0

			1	2	3
1	(Montenegro) (Rwanda)	Daniel Danilović; Eric Hagenimana	6; 4	6; 2
2	(Montenegro) (Rwanda)	Goran Tošić; Jean-Claude Gasigwa	6; 2	6; 1
3	(Montenegro) (Rwanda)	Marko Begović / Nemanja Kontić; Jean-Claude Gasigwa / Jean-Paul Nshimiyimana	6; 1	6; 3

=== Andorra vs. Montenegro ===
Andorra
0
Master Class Tennis and Fitness Club, Yerevan, Armenia
10 August 2007
Clay

Montenegro
3

			1	2	3
1	(Andorra) (Montenegro)	Pau Gerbaud-Farras; Nemanja Kontić	4; 6	1; 6
2	(Andorra) (Montenegro)	Jean-Baptiste Poux-Gautier; Goran Tošić	2; 3			retired
3	(Andorra) (Montenegro)	Hector Hormigo-Herrera / Jordi Vila-Vila; Marko Begović / Daniel Danilović	7^{11} 6^{9}	2; 6	3; 6

=== Botswana vs. Rwanda ===
Botswana
2
Master Class Tennis and Fitness Club, Yerevan, Armenia
10 August 2007
Clay

Rwanda
1

			1	2	3
1	(Botswana) (Rwanda)	Bokang Setshogo; Dieu-Donne Habiyambere	6; 1	6; 1
2	(Botswana) (Rwanda)	Phenyo Matong; Jean-Claude Gasigwa	6; 1	1; 6	6; 0
3	(Botswana) (Rwanda)	Phenyo Matong / Ernest Seleke; Dieu-Donne Habiyambere / Jean-Paul Nshimiyimana	2; 6	7; 5	7; 9

=== Andorra vs. Rwanda ===
Andorra
3
Master Class Tennis and Fitness Club, Yerevan, Armenia
11 August 2007
Clay

Rwanda
0

			1	2	3
1	(Andorra) (Rwanda)	Pau Gerbaud-Farras; Jean-Paul Nshimiyimana	6; 0	6; 4
2	(Andorra) (Rwanda)	Jean-Baptiste Poux-Gautier; Jean-Claude Gasigwa	6; 4	6; 1
3	(Andorra) (Rwanda)	Hector Hormigo-Herrera / Jordi Vila-Vila; Jean-Claude Gasigwa / Dieu-Donne Habiyambere	6; 1	6; 1

=== Armenia vs. Botswana ===
Armenia
2
Master Class Tennis and Fitness Club, Yerevan, Armenia
11 August 2007
Clay

Botswana
1

			1	2	3
1	(Armenia) (Botswana)	Hovhannes Davtyan; Bokang Setshogo	1; 6	3; 6
2	(Armenia) (Botswana)	Harutyun Sofyan; Phenyo Matong	6; 3	6; 2
3	(Armenia) (Botswana)	Harutyun Sofyan / Hayk Zohranyan; Onkabetse Matong / Bokang Setshogo	6; 1	6; 1

=== Andorra vs. Botswana ===
Andorra
1
Master Class Tennis and Fitness Club, Yerevan, Armenia
12 August 2007
Clay

Botswana
2

			1	2	3
1	(Andorra) (Botswana)	Hector Hormigo-Herrera; Bokang Setshogo	2; 6	3; 6
2	(Andorra) (Botswana)	Pau Gerbaud-Farras; Phenyo Matong	4; 6	3; 6
3	(Andorra) (Botswana)	Jean-Baptiste Poux-Gautier / Jordi Vila-Vila; Phenyo Matong / Ernest Seleke	6; 1	6; 1

=== Armenia vs. Montenegro ===
Armenia
0
Master Class Tennis and Fitness Club, Yerevan, Armenia
12 August 2007
Clay

Montenegro
3

			1	2	3
1	(Armenia) (Montenegro)	Harutyun Sofyan; Marko Begović	5; 7	1; 3		retired
2	(Armenia) (Montenegro)	Hayk Zohranyan; Goran Tošić	1; 6	0; 4		retired
3	(Armenia) (Montenegro)	Hovhannes Davtyan / Ashot Gevorgyan; Daniel Danilović / Nemanja Kontić	1; 6	4; 6
