= 2011 European Youth Olympic Winter Festival =

2011 edition of the European Youth Olympic Winter Festival

- Host city: Liberec
- Country: Czech Republic
- Nations: 44
- Athletes: 1,492
- Sport: 8
- Events: 28
- Opening: 13 February 2011
- Closing: 18 February 2011
- Opened by: Václav Klaus
- Main venue: Tipsport Arena

Summer

Winter

The 2011 European Youth Olympic Winter Festival was held in Liberec, Czech Republic, between 13 and 18 February 2011.

== Sports ==
2011 European Youth Olympic Winter Festival Sports Programme
- Alpine skiing (5)
- Biathlon (5)
- Cross-country skiing (7)
- Figure skating (2)
- Ice hockey (1)
- Nordic combined (2)
- Ski jumping (2)
- Snowboarding (4)

== Participant nations ==
Participating National Olympic Committees
- Albania (2)
- Andorra (4)
- Armenia (10)
- Austria (41)
- Belarus (19)
- Belgium (2)
- (Bosnia and Herzegovina) Bosnia Herzegovina (10)
- Bulgaria (21)
- Croatia (11)
- Cyprus (2)
- Czech Republic (61)
- Denmark (3)
- Estonia (19)
- Finland (55)
- France (42)
- (Georgia (country)) Georgia (6)
- Germany (35)
- Greece (17)
- Hungary (7)
- Iceland (11)
- (Republic of Ireland) Ireland (3)
- Italy (42)
- Latvia (44)
- Liechtenstein (4)
- Lithuania (14)
- (North Macedonia) Macedonia (3)
- Luxembourg (2)
- Moldova (2)
- Montenegro (4)
- Monaco (1)
- Netherlands (5)
- Norway (31)
- Poland (32)
- Romania (29)
- Russia (61)
- Serbia (6)
- Slovakia (50)
- Slovenia (33)
- Spain (5)
- Sweden (22)
- Switzerland (59)
- Turkey (31)
- Ukraine (38)
- United Kingdom (16)

Azerbaijan, Israel, Malta, Portugal and San Marino (the remaining nations of the European Olympic Committees) did not compete.

== Mascot ==
The mascot for this edition of European Youth Olympic Winter Festival is Rampich the icicle.

== Venues ==
Venues used in this European Youth Olympic Winter Festival are:

Venue	Location	Sports
Ještěd	Liberec	Alpine skiing, Nordic combined
Ještěd ski jumping hills	Liberec	Ski jumping
Vesec	Liberec	Cross country skiing, Nordic combined
Tipsport Arena	Liberec	Ice Hockey
Svijanská Arena	Liberec	Figure skating
Rejdice Snowpark	Kořenov	Snowboarding
Břízky	Jablonec nad Nisou	Biathlon

== Calendar ==
●	Opening ceremony	Event competitions	●	Event finals	●	Closing ceremony

February 2011	13th Sun	14th Mon	15th Tue	16th Wed	17th Thu	18th Fri	Gold Medals
Ceremonies	●					●	
Alpine skiing		●	●	●	●	●	5
Biathlon			●●	●●		●	5
Cross country skiing		●●	●●		●●	●	7
Figure skating				●●			2
Ice hockey						●	1
Nordic combined			●		●		2
Ski jumping			●		●		2
Snowboarding			●●		●●		4
Total Gold Medals		3	9	5	7	4	28
Cumulative Total		3	12	17	24	28	

== Medal table ==
* Host nation (Czech Republic)

Rank	Nation	Gold	Silver	Bronze	Total
1	Germany (GER)	6	5	5	16
2	Norway (NOR)	5	4	6	15
3	Sweden (SWE)	4	1	1	6
4	Finland (FIN)	3	3	2	8
5	Italy (ITA)	2	3	1	6
6	Russia (RUS)	2	2	4	8
7	Czech Republic (CZE)*	2	0	0	2
8	Austria (AUT)	1	3	3	7
9	Switzerland (SUI)	1	2	3	6
10	Slovenia (SLO)	1	2	0	3
11	Poland (POL)	1	0	0	1
12	France (FRA)	0	2	2	4
13	Belgium (BEL)	0	1	0	1
14	Slovakia (SVK)	0	0	1	1
Totals (14 entries)		28	28	28	84
