= Ice hockey at the 2011 European Youth Olympic Winter Festival =

2013 European Youth Olympic Winter Festival – Ice hockey

Tournament details
- Host country: Czech Republic
- Venue(s): 1 (in 1 host city)
- Dates: 14–18 February 2011
- Teams: 6

Final positions
- Champions: Russia
- Runner-up: Finland
- Third place: Switzerland
- Fourth place: Czech Republic

Ice hockey at the 2011 European Youth Olympic Winter Festival was a men's junior ice hockey tournament played during the Liberec 2011 edition of the European Youth Olympic Festival (EYOF). It was held at the Tipsport Arena in Liberec, Czech Republic from 14 to 18 February 2011.

== Results ==
=== Medal table ===
Rank	Nation	Gold	Silver	Bronze	Total
1	Russia (RUS)	1	0	0	1
2	Finland (FIN)	0	1	0	1
3	Switzerland (SUI)	0	0	1	1
Totals (3 entries)		1	1	1	3

=== Medalists ===
Event	Gold	Silver	Bronze
Boys Team	Team Russia; Russia	Team Finland; Finland	Team Switzerland; Switzerland

== Group stage ==
=== Group A ===
Team	GP	W	OTW	OTL	L	GF	GA	DIF	Pts
Finland	2	2	0	0	0	9	4	+5	6
Czech Republic	2	1	0	0	1	5	6	−1	3
Slovakia	2	0	0	0	2	5	9	−4	0

February 14, 2011; 18:00	Slovakia	3 – 5 (1–2, 1–2, 1–1)	Finland	Tipsport Arena

Game reference
12 min	Penalties	8 min
25	Shots	37

15 February 2011; 18:00	Czech Republic	4 – 2 (0–0, 2–1, 2–1)	Slovakia	Tipsport Arena

Game reference
12 min	Penalties	8 min
30	Shots	30

16 February 2011; 14:30	Finland	4 – 1 (1–0, 1–0, 2–1)	Czech Republic	Tipsport Arena

Game reference
2 min	Penalties	6 min
26	Shots	16

=== Group B ===
Team	GP	W	OTW	OTL	L	GF	GA	DIF	Pts
Russia	2	1	1	0	0	11	5	+6	5
Switzerland	2	1	0	1	0	7	7	0	4
Latvia	2	0	0	0	2	5	11	−6	0

14 February 2011; 14:30	Latvia	2 – 7 (1–2, 0–1, 1–4)	Russia	Tipsport Arena

Game reference
10 min	Penalties	12 min
18	Shots	36

15 February 2011; 14:30	Switzerland	4 – 3 (3–1, 1–1, 0–1)	Latvia	Tipsport Arena

Game reference
10 min	Penalties	10 min
36	Shots	22

16 February 2011; 18:00	Russia	4 – 3 GWS (1–0, 1–2, 1–1) (OT: 0–0) (SO: 1–0)	Switzerland	Tipsport Arena

Game reference
8 min	Penalties	8 min
39	Shots	24

== Knockout stage ==
=== 5th place match ===
17 February 2011; 15:00	Slovakia	3 – 4 (0–4, 2–0, 1–0)	Latvia	Tipsport Arena

Game reference
14 min	Penalties	39 min
36	Shots	30

=== 3rd place match ===
17 February 2011; 19:00	Switzerland	5 – 1 (3–1, 2–0, 0–0)	Czech Republic	Tipsport Arena

Game reference
10 min	Penalties	12 min
38	Shots	23

=== Final ===
18 February 2011; 12:00	Finland	1 – 2 (0–0, 1–1, 0–0) (OT: 0–1)	Russia	Tipsport Arena

Game reference
2 min	Penalties	6 min
24	Shots	29
