= 2011 European Youth Olympic Festival =

2011 European Youth Olympic Festival may refer to:

- 2011 European Youth Summer Olympic Festival
- 2011 European Youth Olympic Winter Festival
