= Nordic combined at the 2011 European Youth Olympic Winter Festival =

- Venue: Ještěd; Vesec
- Date: 15–17 February

Nordic combined at the 2011 European Youth Winter Olympic Festival was held from 13 to 17 February 2011. It was held at the Ski Jumping Venue Ještěd and the Cross Country Venue Vesec at Liberec, Czech Republic.

== Results ==
=== Medal table ===
Rank	Nation	Gold	Silver	Bronze	Total
1	Germany (GER)	1	1	0	2
2	Austria (AUT)	1	0	0	1
3	Finland (FIN)	0	1	1	2
4	Norway (NOR)	0	0	1	1
Totals (4 entries)		2	2	2	6

=== Events ===
Event	Gold	Silver	Bronze
Individual	David Welde (GER)	Jani Peltola (FIN)	Mads Kristoffer Waaler (NOR)
Team	Austria (AUT); Paul Gerstgraser; Philipp Orter	Germany (GER); Jakob Lange; David Welde	Finland (FIN); Ilkka Herola; Jani Peltola
