= Lewis Hodous =

American missionary (1872–1949)

- Born: December 31, 1872; Vesec, Kingdom of Bohemia
- Died: August 9, 1949 (aged 76); Northfield, Massachusetts, United States

Lewis Hodous (simplified Chinese: 何乐益; traditional Chinese: 何樂益; Pinyin: Hé Lèyì; Foochow Romanized: Hò̤ Lŏk-ék; December 31, 1872 – August 9, 1949) was an American Board missionary to China, educator, Sinologist and Buddhologist.

== Life ==
Lewis Hodous was born on December 31, 1872, in Vesec, Bohemia and migrated to the United States with his parents in 1882. He graduated from Cleveland High School in 1893, from Adelbert College of Western Reserve University in 1897 and Hartford Theological Seminary in 1900, and studied one year at the University of Halle in Germany.

Hodous was ordained as a Congregational preacher on September 18, 1901, at Bethlehem Church in Cleveland, Ohio, and was later sent to the mission field of China with his newly wedded wife Anna Jelinek. They embarked from San Francisco on November 16 and arrived in Fuzhou on December 18. From 1901 to 1917 Hodous labored as a missionary under the American Board of Commissioners for Foreign Missions (ABCFM) in Fuzhou, during which time he also carried out careful studies on Buddhism and the Chinese folk religion. He served in Ponasang (保福山) from 1901 to 1904, teaching at the mission's theological seminary, and was president of Foochow Theological Seminary from 1902 to 1912. During the Hsinhai Revolution in 1911 he served with Chinese Red Cross. He was president of the Foochow Union Theological School from 1914 to 1917.

Hodous returned from the mission field in 1917 and arrived home on October 31. From 1917 to 1945 Hodous was professor of Chinese culture at the Kennedy School of Missions of Hartford Seminary Foundation, and from 1928 to 1941 professor of history and philosophy of religion at the seminary. During the Second World War Hodous also worked as a translator for the U.S. Government.

Hodous died on August 9, 1949, in Mount Hermon, Massachusetts, while in retirement.

== Selected works ==
- Chinese translation of Edward L. Thorndike's Principles of Teaching: Based on Psychology (1918)
- Buddhism and Buddhists in China (1924)
- Folkways in China (1929)
- Careers for Students of Chinese Language and Civilization (1933)
- A Dictionary of Chinese Buddhist Terms: with Sanskrit and English Equivalents and a Sanskrit-Pali Index (1937, with William Edward Soothill)
