= Tipsport Arena =

Tipsport Arena may refer to:

- Sportovní hala Fortuna, located in Prague, Czech Republic, known as Tipsport Arena between 2011 and 2022
- Home Credit Arena, located in Liberec, Czech Republic, known as Tipsport Arena between 2005 and 2014
- Enteria arena (Pardubice), located in Pardubice, Czech Republic, known as Tipsport Arena between 2015 and 2018
