= 2005 Davis Cup =

2005 edition of the Davis Cup

Details
- Duration: 4 March – 4 December 2005
- Edition: 94th
- Teams: 130

Champion
- Winning nation: Croatia

The 2005 Davis Cup was the 94th edition of the most important tournament between nations in men's tennis. A total of 130 teams participated in the tournament. The final took place 2–4 December at the Sibamac Arena in Bratislava, Slovakia, with Croatia defeating Slovakia for their first title.

== World Group ==
Participating Teams
Argentina	Australia	Austria	Belarus
Czech Republic	Chile	Croatia	France
Netherlands	Romania	Russia	Slovakia
Spain	Sweden	Switzerland	United States

=== Draw ===
First round 4-6 March
Bratislava, Slovakia (indoor hard)
1	Spain	1
Slovakia	4
Fribourg, Switzerland (indoor hard)
7	Switzerland	2
Netherlands	3
Sydney, Australia (grass)
4	Australia	5
Austria	0
Buenos Aires, Argentina (clay)
6	Argentina	5
Czech Republic	0
Moscow, Russia (indoor carpet)
Chile	1
5	Russia	4
Strasbourg, France (indoor clay)
Sweden	1
3	France	4
Braşov, Romania (indoor clay)
Romania	3
8	Belarus	2
Los Angeles, United States (hard)
Croatia	3
2	United States	2

Quarterfinals; 15-17 July
Bratislava, Slovakia (indoor hard)
Slovakia	4
Netherlands	1
Sydney, Australia (grass)
4	Australia	1
6	Argentina	4
Moscow, Russia (indoor clay)
5	Russia	3
3	France	2
Split, Croatia (indoor carpet)
Romania	1
Croatia	4

Semifinals; 23-25 September
Bratislava, Slovakia (indoor hard)
Slovakia	4
6	Argentina	1
Split, Croatia (indoor carpet)
5	Russia	2
Croatia	3

Final; 2-4 December
Bratislava, Slovakia (indoor hard)
Slovakia	2
Croatia	3

First round losers compete in play-off ties with Zonal Group I Qualifiers.

=== Final ===
Slovakia
2
Sibamac Arena, Bratislava, Slovakia
2–4 December 2005
Hard (i)

Croatia
3

			1	2	3	4	5
1	(Slovakia) (Croatia)	Karol Kučera; Ivan Ljubičić	3; 6	4; 6	3; 6
2	(Slovakia) (Croatia)	Dominik Hrbatý; Mario Ančić	7^{7} 6^{4}	6; 4	6^{4} 7^{7}	6; 4
3	(Slovakia) (Croatia)	Dominik Hrbatý / Michal Mertiňák; Mario Ančić / Ivan Ljubičić	6^{5} 7^{7}	3; 6	6^{5} 7^{7}
4	(Slovakia) (Croatia)	Dominik Hrbatý; Ivan Ljubičić	4; 6	6; 3	6; 4	3; 6	6; 4
5	(Slovakia) (Croatia)	Michal Mertiňák; Mario Ančić	6^{1} 7^{7}	3; 6	4; 6

== World Group play-offs ==
Date: 23–25 September

Home team	Score	Visiting team	Location	Venue	Door	Surface
Austria	4–1	Ecuador	Pörtschach	Werzer Arena	Outdoor	Hard
Canada	2–3	Belarus	Toronto	Rexall Centre	Outdoor	Hard
Chile	5–0	Pakistan	Santiago	Estadio Nacional	Outdoor	Clay
Czech Republic	2–3	Germany	Liberec	Tipsport Arena (Liberec)	Indoor	Clay
Italy	2–3	Spain	Torre del Greco	Sporting Club Oplonti	Outdoor	Clay
India	1–3	Sweden	New Delhi	R.K. Khanna Tennis Complex	Outdoor	Grass
Switzerland	5–0	Great Britain	Geneva	Palexpo	Indoor	Clay
Belgium	1–4	United States	Leuven	Sportplaza Leuven	Indoor	Clay

- Austria, Belarus, Chile, Spain, Sweden, Switzerland and United States will remain in the World Group in 2006.
- Germany are promoted to the World Group in 2006.
- Belgium, Canada, Ecuador, Great Britain, India, Italy and Pakistan will remain in Zonal Group I in 2006.
- Czech Republic are relegated to Zonal Group I in 2006.

== Americas Zone ==
=== Group I ===
Second Round Play-offs
Lima, Peru (clay)
Peru	5
2	Paraguay	0

First Round Play-offs
bye
Peru
Puebla, Mexico (indoor hard)
Mexico	5
2	Paraguay	0

First Round
1	Canada
bye
Caracas, Venezuela (hard)
Venezuela	4
Peru	1
Guanajuato, Mexico (indoor hard)
Mexico	2
Ecuador	3
bye
2	Paraguay

Second Round
Valencia, Venezuela (clay)
1	Canada	4
Venezuela	0
Guayaquil, Ecuador (clay)
Ecuador	5
2	Paraguay	0

- Paraguay relegated to Group II in 2006.
- Canada and Ecuador advance to World Group Play-off.

=== Group II ===
Play-offs
Bogotá, Colombia (clay)
Colombia	5
3	Bahamas	0
Kingston, Jamaica (hard)
Cuba	1
Jamaica	3

First Round
Bogotá, Colombia (clay)
Colombia	0
1	Brazil	5
Curaçao, Netherlands Antilles (hard)
3	Bahamas	2
Netherlands Antilles	3
Havana, Cuba (hard)
Cuba	2
4	Uruguay	3
Kingston, Jamaica (hard)
Jamaica	2
2	Dominican Republic	3

Second Round
Santa Catarina, Brazil (indoor clay)
1	Brazil	5
Netherlands Antilles	0
Montevideo, Uruguay (clay)
4	Uruguay	4
2	Dominican Republic	1

Third Round
Montevideo, Uruguay (clay)
1	Brazil	3
4	Uruguay	2

- Bahamas and Cuba relegated to Group III in 2006.
- Brazil promoted to Group I in 2006.

=== Group III ===
Venue: Club de Tenis La Paz, La Paz, Bolivia (clay)
Date: Week of 28 February

	Group A	BOL	HAI	HON	LCA
1	Bolivia (3–0)		3–0	3–0	3–0
2	Haiti (2–1)	0–3		3–0	2–1
3	Honduras (1–2)	0–3	0–3		3–0
4	Saint Lucia (0–3)	0–3	1–2	0–3	

	Group B	GUA	PUR	ESA	PAN
1	Guatemala (3–0)		2–1	2–1	3–0
2	Puerto Rico (2–1)	1–2		2–1	2–1
3	El Salvador (1–2)	1–2	1–2		3–0
4	Panama (0–3)	0–3	1–2	0–3	

(scores in italics carried over from Groups)

	1st–4th Play-off	GUA	BOL	PUR	HAI
1	Guatemala (3–0)		3–0	2–1	3–0
2	Bolivia (2–1)	0–3		3–0	3–0
3	Puerto Rico (1–2)	1–2	0–3		2–0
4	Haiti (0–3)	0–3	0–3	0–2	

	5th–8th Play-off	HON	ESA	PAN	LCA
1	Honduras (3–0)		2–0	2–1	3–0
2	El Salvador (2–1)	0–2		3–0	3–0
3	Panama (1–2)	1–2	0–3		2–0
4	Saint Lucia (0–3)	0–3	0–3	0–2	

- Guatemala and Bolivia promoted to Group II in 2006.
- Panama and St. Lucia relegated to Group IV in 2006.

The Group III tournament was held in the Week commencing February 28, in Club de Tenis La Paz, La Paz, Bolivia, on outdoor clay courts.

== Format ==
The eight teams were split into two groups and played in a round-robin format. The top two teams of each group advanced to the promotion pool, from which the two top teams were promoted to the Americas Zone Group II in 2006. The last two placed teams of each group from the preliminary round were relegated into the relegation pool, from which the two bottom teams were relegated to the Americas Zone Group IV in 2006.

== Pool A ==
	Group A	BOL	HAI	HON	LCA
1	Bolivia (3–0)		3–0	3–0	3–0
2	Haiti (2–1)	0–3		3–0	2–1
3	Honduras (1–2)	0–3	0–3		3–0
4	Saint Lucia (0–3)	0–3	1–2	0–3	

=== Haiti vs. Saint Lucia ===
Haiti
2
Club de Tenis La Paz, La Paz, Bolivia
2 March 2005
Clay

Saint Lucia
1

			1	2	3
1	(Haiti) (Saint Lucia)	Bertrand Madsen; Vernon Lewis	6; 3	6; 4
2	(Haiti) (Saint Lucia)	Olivier Sajous; Sirsean Arlain	6; 2	6; 1
3	(Haiti) (Saint Lucia)	Gael Gaetjens / Iphton Louis; Kane Easter / Vernon Lewis	4; 6	4; 6

=== Honduras vs. Bolivia ===
Honduras
0
Club de Tenis La Paz, La Paz, Bolivia
2 March 2005
Clay

Bolivia
3

			1	2	3
1	(Honduras) (Bolivia)	José Moncada; José Antelo	5; 7	2; 6
2	(Honduras) (Bolivia)	Calton Álvarez; Mauricio Estívariz	2; 6	5; 7
3	(Honduras) (Bolivia)	Carlos Cáceres / José Moncada; José Antelo / Mauricio Estívariz	6; 2	5; 7	2; 6

=== Haiti vs. Bolivia ===
Haiti
0
Club de Tenis La Paz, La Paz, Bolivia
3 March 2005
Clay

Bolivia
3

			1	2	3
1	(Haiti) (Bolivia)	Bertrand Madsen; José Antelo	6; 3	3; 6	4; 6
2	(Haiti) (Bolivia)	Olivier Sajous; Mauricio Estívariz	1; 6	6^{8} 7^{10}
3	(Haiti) (Bolivia)	Iphton Louis / Bertrand Madsen; Mario Salinas / Jorge Villanueva	2; 6	7^{7} 6^{2}	8; 10

=== Honduras vs. Saint Lucia ===
Honduras
3
Club de Tenis La Paz, La Paz, Bolivia
3 March 2005
Clay

Saint Lucia
0

			1	2	3
1	(Honduras) (Saint Lucia)	José Moncada; Alberton Richelieu	6; 4	7; 5
2	(Honduras) (Saint Lucia)	Calton Álvarez; Vernon Lewis	6; 1	6; 4
3	(Honduras) (Saint Lucia)	Carlos Cáceres / José Moncada; Kane Easter / Vernon Lewis	6; 3	2; 6	7; 5

=== Haiti vs. Honduras ===
Haiti
3
Club de Tenis La Paz, La Paz, Bolivia
4 March 2005
Clay

Honduras
0

			1	2	3
1	(Haiti) (Honduras)	Bertrand Madsen; José Moncada	6; 3	6; 4
2	(Haiti) (Honduras)	Olivier Sajous; Calton Álvarez	7^{7} 6^{5}	6; 4
3	(Haiti) (Honduras)	Gael Gaetjens / Iphton Louis; Carlos Cáceres / José Moncada	6; 3	6; 3

=== Bolivia vs. Saint Lucia ===
Bolivia
3
Club de Tenis La Paz, La Paz, Bolivia
4 March 2005
Clay

Saint Lucia
0

			1	2	3
1	(Bolivia) (Saint Lucia)	José Antelo; Kane Easter	6; 0	6; 3
2	(Bolivia) (Saint Lucia)	Mauricio Estívariz; Sirsean Arlain	6; 0	6; 1
3	(Bolivia) (Saint Lucia)	Mario Salinas / Jorge Villanueva; Sirsean Arlain / Kane Easter	6; 3	6; 3

== Pool B ==
	Group B	GUA	PUR	ESA	PAN
1	Guatemala (3–0)		2–1	2–1	3–0
2	Puerto Rico (2–1)	1–2		2–1	2–1
3	El Salvador (1–2)	1–2	1–2		3–0
4	Panama (0–3)	0–3	1–2	0–3	

=== Guatemala vs. Panama ===
Guatemala
3
Club de Tenis La Paz, La Paz, Bolivia
2 March 2005
Clay

Panama
0

			1	2	3
1	(Guatemala) (Panama)	Cristian Paiz; Alberto González	6; 3	6; 2
2	(Guatemala) (Panama)	Jacobo Chávez; Augusto Alvarado	6; 1	6; 2
3	(Guatemala) (Panama)	Manuel Chávez / Luis Pérez Chete; Braen Aneiros-Romero / Alberto González	6; 2	6; 4

=== El Salvador vs. Puerto Rico ===
El Salvador
1
Club de Tenis La Paz, La Paz, Bolivia
2 March 2005
Clay

Puerto Rico
2

			1	2	3
1	(El Salvador) (Puerto Rico)	Manuel-Antonio Tejada-Ruiz; Jorge Rangel	1; 6	4; 6
2	(El Salvador) (Puerto Rico)	Rafael Arévalo; Gabriel Montilla	6; 2	6; 0
3	(El Salvador) (Puerto Rico)	Rafael Arévalo / Manuel-Antonio Tejada-Ruiz; Gilberto Álvarez / Gabriel Montilla	3; 6	4; 6

=== Guatemala vs. Puerto Rico ===
Guatemala
2
Club de Tenis La Paz, La Paz, Bolivia
3 March 2005
Clay

Puerto Rico
1

			1	2	3
1	(Guatemala) (Puerto Rico)	Cristian Paiz; Jorge Rangel	6; 2	6; 1
2	(Guatemala) (Puerto Rico)	Jacobo Chávez; Gabriel Montilla	6; 3	6; 2
3	(Guatemala) (Puerto Rico)	Manuel Chávez / Luis Pérez Chete; Gilberto Álvarez / Gabriel Montilla	7; 5	6^{5} 7^{7}	4; 6

=== El Salvador vs. Panama ===
El Salvador
3
Club de Tenis La Paz, La Paz, Bolivia
3 March 2005
Clay

Panama
0

			1	2	3
1	(El Salvador) (Panama)	Manuel-Antonio Tejada-Ruiz; Juan José Fuentes	6; 2	6; 2
2	(El Salvador) (Panama)	Rafael Arévalo; Alberto González	6; 2	6; 1
3	(El Salvador) (Panama)	Rafael Arévalo / Manuel-Antonio Tejada-Ruiz; Juan José Fuentes / Alberto González	6; 3	6; 3

=== Guatemala vs. El Salvador ===
Guatemala
2
Club de Tenis La Paz, La Paz, Bolivia
4 March 2005
Clay

El Salvador
1

			1	2	3
1	(Guatemala) (El Salvador)	Cristian Paiz; Manuel-Antonio Tejada-Ruiz	6; 3	6; 4
2	(Guatemala) (El Salvador)	Jacobo Chávez; Rafael Arévalo	3; 6	1; 6
3	(Guatemala) (El Salvador)	Manuel Chávez / Luis Pérez Chete; Rafael Arévalo / Manuel-Antonio Tejada-Ruiz	6; 4	6; 4

=== Puerto Rico vs. Panama ===
Puerto Rico
2
Club de Tenis La Paz, La Paz, Bolivia
4 March 2005
Clay

Panama
1

			1	2	3
1	(Puerto Rico) (Panama)	Gilberto Álvarez; Braen Aneiros-Romero	6; 4	6; 2
2	(Puerto Rico) (Panama)	Gabriel Montilla; Alberto González	3; 6	5; 7
3	(Puerto Rico) (Panama)	Gilberto Álvarez / Gabriel Montilla; Juan José Fuentes / Alberto González	6; 3	6; 2

== Promotion pool ==
The top two teams from each of Pools A and B advanced to the Promotion pool. Results and points from games against the opponent from the preliminary round were carried forward.

(scores in italics carried over from Groups)

	1st–4th Play-off	GUA	BOL	PUR	HAI
1	Guatemala (3–0)		3–0	2–1	3–0
2	Bolivia (2–1)	0–3		3–0	3–0
3	Puerto Rico (1–2)	1–2	0–3		2–0
4	Haiti (0–3)	0–3	0–3	0–2	

- Guatemala and Bolivia promoted to Group II in 2006.

=== Bolivia vs. Puerto Rico ===
Bolivia
3
Club de Tenis La Paz, La Paz, Bolivia
5 March 2005
Clay

Puerto Rico
0

			1	2	3
1	(Bolivia) (Puerto Rico)	José Antelo; Gilberto Álvarez	6; 2	6; 2
2	(Bolivia) (Puerto Rico)	Mauricio Estívariz; Gabriel Montilla	7; 5	6; 2
3	(Bolivia) (Puerto Rico)	José Antelo / Mauricio Estívariz; Gilberto Álvarez / Gabriel Montilla	5; 7	6; 3	6; 2

=== Haiti vs. Guatemala ===
Haiti
0
Club de Tenis La Paz, La Paz, Bolivia
5 March 2005
Clay

Guatemala
3

			1	2	3
1	(Haiti) (Guatemala)	Bertrand Madsen; Luis Pérez Chete	4; 6	6; 2	4; 6
2	(Haiti) (Guatemala)	Olivier Sajous; Cristian Paiz	5; 7	2; 6
3	(Haiti) (Guatemala)	Gael Gaetjens / Iphton Louis; Jacobo Chávez / Luis Pérez Chete	4; 6	2; 6

=== Bolivia vs. Guatemala ===
Bolivia
0
Club de Tenis La Paz, La Paz, Bolivia
6 March 2005
Clay

Guatemala
3

			1	2	3
1	(Bolivia) (Guatemala)	José Antelo; Luis Pérez Chete	0; 6	5; 7
2	(Bolivia) (Guatemala)	Mauricio Estívariz; Cristian Paiz	6^{4} 7^{7}	3; 6
3	(Bolivia) (Guatemala)	Mario Salinas / Jorge Villanueva; Jacobo Chávez / Manuel Chávez	6; 2	4; 6	2; 6

=== Haiti vs. Puerto Rico ===
Haiti
0
Club de Tenis La Paz, La Paz, Bolivia
6 March 2005
Clay

Puerto Rico
2

			1	2	3
1	(Haiti) (Puerto Rico)	Gael Gaetjens; Gilberto Álvarez	0; 6	0; 6
2	(Haiti) (Puerto Rico)	Olivier Sajous; Jorge Rangel	3; 6	3; 6
3	(Haiti) (Puerto Rico)	Gael Gaetjens / Olivier Sajous; Gilberto Álvarez / Jorge Rangel				not played

== Relegation pool ==
The bottom two teams from Pools A and B were placed in the relegation group. Results and points from games against the opponent from the preliminary round were carried forward.

(scores in italics carried over from Groups)

	5th–8th Play-off	HON	ESA	PAN	LCA
1	Honduras (3–0)		2–0	2–1	3–0
2	El Salvador (2–1)	0–2		3–0	3–0
3	Panama (1–2)	1–2	0–3		2–0
4	Saint Lucia (0–3)	0–3	0–3	0–2	

- Panama and St. Lucia relegated to Group IV in 2006.

=== Honduras vs. Panama ===
Honduras
2
Club de Tenis La Paz, La Paz, Bolivia
5 March 2005
Clay

Panama
1

			1	2	3
1	(Honduras) (Panama)	José Moncada; Braen Aneiros-Romero	3; 6	6; 3	6; 2
2	(Honduras) (Panama)	Calton Álvarez; Alberto González	5; 7	4; 6
3	(Honduras) (Panama)	Carlos Cáceres / José Moncada; Braen Aneiros-Romero / Alberto González	6; 4	7^{7} 6^{3}

=== Saint Lucia vs. El Salvador ===
Saint Lucia
0
Club de Tenis La Paz, La Paz, Bolivia
5 March 2005
Clay

El Salvador
3

			1	2	3
1	(Saint Lucia) (El Salvador)	Vernon Lewis; Manuel-Antonio Tejada-Ruiz	6; 3	0; 6	2; 6
2	(Saint Lucia) (El Salvador)	Sirsean Arlain; Rafael Arévalo	1; 6	0; 6
3	(Saint Lucia) (El Salvador)	Kane Easter / Alberton Richelieu; Rafael Arévalo / Manuel-Antonio Tejada-Ruiz	1; 6	4; 6

=== Honduras vs. El Salvador ===
Honduras
2
Club de Tenis La Paz, La Paz, Bolivia
6 March 2005
Clay

El Salvador
0

			1	2	3
1	(Honduras) (El Salvador)	Carlos Cáceres; Marcelo Arévalo	6; 1	6; 1
2	(Honduras) (El Salvador)	José Moncada; Manuel-Antonio Tejada-Ruiz	6; 4	6^{3} 7^{7}	6; 1
3	(Honduras) (El Salvador)	Carlos Cáceres / José Moncada; Marcelo Arévalo / Manuel-Antonio Tejada-Ruiz				not played

=== Saint Lucia vs. Panama ===
Saint Lucia
0
Club de Tenis La Paz, La Paz, Bolivia
6 March 2005
Clay

Panama
2

			1	2	3
1	(Saint Lucia) (Panama)	Kane Easter; Braen Aneiros-Romero	6^{8} 7^{10}	6; 4	4; 6
2	(Saint Lucia) (Panama)	Sirsean Arlain; Alberto González	3; 6	3; 6
3	(Saint Lucia) (Panama)	Sirsean Arlain / Kane Easter; Braen Aneiros-Romero / Alberto González				not played

== Final standings ==
Rank	Team
1	Guatemala
2	Bolivia
3	Puerto Rico
4	Haiti
5	Honduras
6	El Salvador
7	Panama
8	Saint Lucia

- Guatemala and Bolivia promoted to Group II in 2006.
- Panama and Saint Lucia relegated to Group IV in 2006.

=== Group IV ===
- Venue: Costa Rica Tennis Club, San José, Costa Rica (outdoor hard)
- Date: 13 - 17 July

Team	Pld	W	L	MF	MA
Trinidad and Tobago	4	3	1	10	2
Costa Rica	4	3	1	8	4
Barbados	4	3	1	8	4
Bermuda	4	1	3	3	9
U.S. Virgin Islands	4	0	4	1	11

Trinidad & Tobago and Costa Rica promoted to Group III for 2006.

== Asia/Oceania Zone ==
=== Group I ===
Second-round play-offs
Bangkok, Thailand (hard)
S	Thailand	4
Indonesia	1

First-round play-offs
Osaka, Japan (indoor carpet)
S	Thailand	1
Japan	4
Tianjin, China (hard)
Indonesia	1
S	China	4

First Round
Lahore, Pakistan (grass)
S	Thailand	2
Pakistan	3
Taoyuan, Taiwan (hard)
S	Chinese Taipei	3
Japan	2
Jakarta, Indonesia (hard)
Indonesia	2
S	Uzbekistan	3
New Delhi, India (grass)
India	5
S	China	0

Second Round
Lahore, Pakistan (grass)
Pakistan	4
S	Chinese Taipei	1
Jaipur, India (grass)
S	Uzbekistan	0
India	5

- Indonesia relegated to Group II in 2006.
- Pakistan and India advance to World Group play-off.

=== Group II ===
Play-offs
Tehran, Iran (clay)
Kazakhstan	3
4	Iran	2
Beirut, Lebanon (clay)
3	Lebanon	3
Philippines	2

First Round
Auckland, New Zealand (indoor hard)
1	New Zealand	4
Kazakhstan	1
Tehran, Iran (clay)
4	Iran	1
Kuwait	4
Lautoka, Fiji (hard)
Pacific Oceania	3
3	Lebanon	2
Manila, Philippines (indoor clay)
Philippines	2
2	South Korea	3

Second Round
Auckland, New Zealand (indoor hard)
1	New Zealand	3
Kuwait	2
Seoul, South Korea (hard)
Pacific Oceania	0
2	South Korea	5

Third Round
Auckland, New Zealand (indoor hard)
1	New Zealand	2
2	South Korea	3

- Iran and the Philippines relegated to Group III in 2006.
- South Korea promoted to Group I in 2006.

=== Group III ===
Venue: Victoria Park Tennis Centre, Causeway Bay, Hong Kong (hard)
Date: 13–17 July

	Group A	HKG	MAS	KSA	TJK
1	Hong Kong (3–0)		3–0	3–0	3–0
2	Malaysia (2–1)	0–3		2–1	3–0
3	Saudi Arabia (1–2)	0–3	1–2		2–1
4	Tajikistan (0–3)	0–3	0–3	1–2	

	Group B	VIE	SRI	BRN	QAT
1	Vietnam (3–0)		2–1	2–1	3–0
2	Sri Lanka (2–1)	1–2		3–0	3–0
3	Bahrain (1–2)	1–2	0–3		2–1
4	Qatar (0–3)	0–3	0–3	1–2	

(scores in italics carried over from Groups)

	1st–4th Play-off	HKG	MAS	VIE	SRI
1	Hong Kong (3–0)		3–0	3–0	3–0
2	Malaysia (2–1)	0–3		3–0	3–0
3	Vietnam (1–2)	0–3	0–3		2–1
4	Sri Lanka (0–3)	0–3	0–3	1–2	

	5th–8th Play-off	BRN	KSA	QAT	TJK
1	Bahrain (2–1)		2–1	2–1	1–2
2	Saudi Arabia (2–1)	1–2		2–1	2–1
3	Qatar (1–2)	1–2	1–2		2–1
4	Tajikistan (1–2)	2–1	1–2	1–2	

- Hong Kong and Malaysia promoted to Group II in 2006.
- Qatar and Tajikistan relegated to Group IV in 2006.

=== Group IV ===
Venue: Thein Byu Tennis Club, Yangon, Myanmar (hard)
Date: 27 April–01 May

	Pool A	BAN	UAE	SYR	KGZ	TKM
1	Bangladesh (4–0)		2–1	2–1	3–0	2–1
2	United Arab Emirates (3–1)	1–2		2–1	2–1	3–0
3	Syria (2–2)	1–2	1–2		3–0	3–0
4	Kyrgyzstan (1–3)	0–3	1–2	0–3		3–0
5	Turkmenistan (0–4)	1–2	0–3	0–3	0–3	

	Pool B	SIN	OMA	MYA	JOR	IRQ
1	Singapore (4–0)		2–1	3–0	2–1	3–0
2	Oman (3–1)	1–2		3–0	3–0	3–0
3	Myanmar (2–2)	0–3	0–3		3–0	3–0
4	Jordan (1–3)	1–2	0–3	0–3		3–0
5	Iraq (0–4)	0–3	0–3	0–3	0–3	

- Bangladesh and Singapore promoted to Group III in 2006.

== Europe/Africa Zone ==
=== Group I ===
Second Round Play-offs
Harare, Zimbabwe (indoor hard)
Israel	4
Zimbabwe	1
Khemisset, Morocco (clay)
S	Morocco	4
South Africa	1

First Round Play-offs
Israel
bye
bye
Zimbabwe
Esch/Alzette, Luxembourg (indoor hard)
Luxembourg	3
S	Morocco	2
South Africa
bye

First round
S	Great Britain
bye
Israel
bye
S	Belgium
bye
Novi Sad, Serbia and Montenegro (indoor clay)
Serbia and Montenegro	5
Zimbabwe	0
Luxembourg City, Lux. (indoor hard)
Italy	5
Luxembourg	0
bye
S	Morocco
bye
South Africa
bye
S	Germany

Second round
Ramat Hasharon, Israel (hard)
S	Great Britain	3
Israel	2
Belgrade, Serbia and Montenegro (clay)
S	Belgium	3
Serbia and Montenegro	2
Rome, Italy (clay)
Italy	4
S	Morocco	1
Doornfontein, South Africa (indoor hard)
South Africa	2
S	Germany	3

- Zimbabwe and South Africa relegated to Group II in 2006.
- Great Britain, Belgium, Italy, and Germany advance to World Group Play-off.

=== Group II ===
Relegation Play-offs
Accra, Ghana (hard)
Ghana	2
Georgia	3
Oslo, Norway (clay)
Monaco	1
Norway	4
Gdynia, Poland (clay)
Estonia	0
S	Poland	5
Athens, Greece (clay)
Ivory Coast	0
S	Greece	5

First Round
Accra, Ghana (hard)
Ghana	0
S	Finland	5
Sofia, Bulgaria (indoor carpet)
S	Bulgaria	4
Georgia	1
Hódmezővásárhely, Hungary (ind. hard)
S	Hungary	4
Monaco	1
Kyiv, Ukraine (indoor carpet)
S	Ukraine	4
Norway	1
Tallinn, Estonia (indoor carpet)
Estonia	1
S	Portugal	4
Algiers, Algeria (clay)
Algeria	3
S	Poland	2
Kranj, Slovenia (indoor hard)
Ivory Coast	0
S	Slovenia	5
Jūrmala, Latvia (indoor carpet)
Latvia	4
S	Greece	1

Second Round
Helsinki, Finland (clay)
S	Finland	2
S	Bulgaria	3
Donetsk, Ukraine (hard)
S	Hungary	2
S	Ukraine	3
Lisbon, Portugal (clay)
S	Portugal	3
Algeria	2
Kranj, Slovenia (clay)
S	Slovenia	5
Latvia	0

Third Round
Donetsk, Ukraine (hard)
S	Bulgaria	1
S	Ukraine	4
Estoril, Portugal (clay)
S	Portugal	4
S	Slovenia	1

- Georgia, Monaco, Estonia, and Côte d'Ivoire relegated to Group III in 2006.
- Ukraine and Portugal promoted to Group I in 2006.

=== Group III ===
==== Zone A ====
Venue: Smash Tennis Academy, Cairo, Egypt (clay)
Date: 27 April – 1 May

	Pool A	MKD	DEN	NAM	KEN
1	North Macedonia (3–0)		3–0	3–0	3–0
2	Denmark (2–1)	0–3		3–0	3–0
3	Namibia (1–2)	0–3	0–3		2–1
4	Kenya (0–3)	0–3	0–3	1–2	

	Pool B	EGY	BIH	LTU	MAD
1	Egypt (3–0)		3–0	2–1	3–0
2	Bosnia and Herzegovina (2–1)	0–3		2–1	2–1
3	Lithuania (1–2)	1–2	1–2		3–0
4	Madagascar (0–2)	0–3	1–2	0–3	

(scores in italics carried over)

	1st–4th Play-off	MKD	EGY	DEN	BIH
1	North Macedonia (3–0)		2–1	3–0	3–0
2	Egypt (2–1)	1–2		2–1	3–0
3	Denmark (1–2)	0–3	1–2		2–1
4	Bosnia and Herzegovina (0–3)	0–3	0–3	1–2	

	5th–8th Play-off	LTU	NAM	MAD	KEN
1	Lithuania (3–0)		2–1	3–0	3–0
2	Namibia (2–1)	1–2		2–1	2–1
3	Madagascar (1–2)	0–3	1–2		3–0
4	Kenya (0–3)	0–3	1–2	0–3	

- North Macedonia and Egypt promoted to Group II in 2006.
- Madagascar and Kenya relegated to Group IV in 2006.

==== Zone B ====
Venue: Fitzwilliam Lawn Tennis Club, Dublin, Ireland (grass)
Date: 13–17 July

	Pool A	IRL	ARM	NGR	ISL
1	Ireland (3–0)		3–0	3–0	3–0
2	Armenia (2–1)	0–3		2–1	2–1
3	Nigeria (1–2)	0–3	1–2		3–0
4	Iceland (0–3)	0–3	1–2	0–3	

	Pool B	CYP	TUN	TUR	SMR
1	Cyprus (3–0)		3–0	2–1	3–0
2	Tunisia (2–1)	0–3		2–1	3–0
3	Turkey (1–2)	1–2	1–2		3–0
4	San Marino (0–3)	0–3	0–3	0–3	

(scores in italics carried over)

	1st–4th Play-off	CYP	IRL	ARM	TUN
1	Cyprus (3–0)		2–1	2–1	3–0
2	Ireland (2–1)	1–2		3–0	3–0
3	Armenia (1–2)	1–2	0–3		2–1
4	Tunisia (0–3)	0–3	0–3	1–2	

	5th–8th Play-off	NGR	TUR	ISL	SMR
1	Nigeria (3–0)		2–1	3–0	3–0
2	Turkey (2–1)	1–2		2–1	3–0
3	Iceland (1–2)	0–3	1–2		2–1
4	San Marino (0–3)	0–3	0–3	1–2	

- Cyprus and Ireland promoted to Group II in 2006.
- Iceland and San Marino relegated to Group IV in 2006.

=== Group IV ===
Venue: Lugogo Tennis Club, Kampala, Uganda (clay)
Date: 1–5 March

	Pool A	MDA	BOT	BEN	MLT	DJI
1	Moldova (4–0)		2–1	3–0	3–0	3–0
2	Botswana (3–1)	1–2		2–1	3–0	3–0
3	Benin (2–2)	0–3	1–2		3–0	3–0
4	Malta (1–3)	0–3	0–3	0–3		3–0
5	Djibouti (0–4)	0–3	0–3	0–3	0–3	

	Pool B	AND	RWA	AZE	SEN	UGA	MRI
1	Andorra (5–0)		2–1	3–0	3–0	3–0	3–0
2	Rwanda (3–2)	1–2		1–2	2–1	2–1	3–0
3	Azerbaijan (3–2)	0–3	2–1		1–2	2–1	3–0
4	Senegal (3–2)	0–3	1–2	2–1		2–1	2–1
5	Uganda (1–4)	0–3	1–2	1–2	1–2		2–1
6	Mauritius (0–5)	0–3	0–3	0–3	1–2	1–2	

- Moldova, Andorra, Botswana and Rwanda promoted to Group III in 2006.

The Europe/Africa Zone was one of the three zones of the regional Davis Cup competition in 2005.

In the Europe/Africa Zone there were four different tiers, called groups, in which teams competed against each other to advance to the upper tier. The Group IV tournament was held March 1–5, in Lugogo Tennis Club, Kampala, Uganda, on outdoor clay courts.

== Format ==
The eleven teams were split into two groups and played in a round-robin format. The top two teams of each group were promoted to the Europe/Africa Zone Group III in 2006.

== Pool A ==
	Pool A	MDA	BOT	BEN	MLT	DJI
1	Moldova (4–0)		2–1	3–0	3–0	3–0
2	Botswana (3–1)	1–2		2–1	3–0	3–0
3	Benin (2–2)	0–3	1–2		3–0	3–0
4	Malta (1–3)	0–3	0–3	0–3		3–0
5	Djibouti (0–4)	0–3	0–3	0–3	0–3	

Moldova and Botswana promoted to Group III in 2006.

=== Moldova vs. Djibouti ===
Moldova
3
Lugogo Tennis Club, Kampala, Uganda
2 March 2005
Clay

Djibouti
0

			1	2	3
1	(Moldova) (Djibouti)	Evghenii Plugariov; Abdi-Fatah Abdourahman-Youssouf	6; 0	6; 0
2	(Moldova) (Djibouti)	Andrei Ciumac; Kadar Mogueh	6; 0	6; 0
3	(Moldova) (Djibouti)	Sergei Cupțov / Artiom Podgainii; Abdi-Fatah Abdourahman-Youssouf / Kadar Mogueh	6; 0	6; 0

=== Botswana vs. Benin ===
Botswana
2
Lugogo Tennis Club, Kampala, Uganda
2 March 2005
Clay

Benin
1

			1	2	3
1	(Botswana) (Benin)	Bokang Setshogo; Romain Setomey	6; 2	4; 6	6; 3
2	(Botswana) (Benin)	Phenyo Matong; Armand Segodo	6^{12} 7^{14}	6; 0	6; 2
3	(Botswana) (Benin)	Phenyo Matong / Bokang Setshogo; Alphonse Gandonou / Armand Segodo	2; 6	4; 6

=== Moldova vs. Malta ===
Moldova
3
Lugogo Tennis Club, Kampala, Uganda
3 March 2005
Clay

Malta
0

			1	2	3
1	(Moldova) (Malta)	Evghenii Plugariov; Marcus Delicata	6; 0	6; 1
2	(Moldova) (Malta)	Andrei Ciumac; Daniel Ceross	6; 2	6; 1
3	(Moldova) (Malta)	Sergei Cupțov / Artiom Podgainii; Matthew Asciak / Marcus Delicata	6; 3	6^{5} 7^{7}	6; 1

=== Benin vs. Djibouti ===
Benin
3
Lugogo Tennis Club, Kampala, Uganda
3 March 2005
Clay

Djibouti
0

			1	2	3
1	(Benin) (Djibouti)	Jean Segodo; Fahim Osman-Obsien	6; 0	6; 0
2	(Benin) (Djibouti)	Armand Segodo; Kadar Mogueh	6; 0	6; 0
3	(Benin) (Djibouti)	Jean Segodo / Romain Setomey; Abdi-Fatah Abdourahman-Youssouf / Fahim Osman-Obsien	6; 0	6; 1

=== Moldova vs. Benin ===
Moldova
3
Lugogo Tennis Club, Kampala, Uganda
4 March 2005
Clay

Benin
0

			1	2	3
1	(Moldova) (Benin)	Evghenii Plugariov; Romain Setomey	7; 5	6; 2
2	(Moldova) (Benin)	Andrei Ciumac; Armand Segodo	6; 1	6; 1
3	(Moldova) (Benin)	Sergei Cupțov / Artiom Podgainii; Alphonse Gandonou / Armand Segodo	7^{7} 6^{5}	7^{7} 6^{5}

=== Botswana vs. Malta ===
Botswana
3
Lugogo Tennis Club, Kampala, Uganda
4 March 2005
Clay

Malta
0

			1	2	3
1	(Botswana) (Malta)	Bokang Setshogo; Marcus Delicata	6; 2	6; 3
2	(Botswana) (Malta)	Phenyo Matong; Daniel Ceross	3; 6	6; 3	6; 4
3	(Botswana) (Malta)	Phenyo Matong / Bokang Setshogo; Matthew Asciak / Marcus Delicata	3; 6	6; 3	6; 4

=== Moldova vs. Botswana ===
Moldova
2
Lugogo Tennis Club, Kampala, Uganda
5 March 2005
Clay

Botswana
1

			1	2	3
1	(Moldova) (Botswana)	Evghenii Plugariov; Bokang Setshogo	6; 2	6; 4
2	(Moldova) (Botswana)	Andrei Ciumac; Phenyo Matong	7; 5	6; 3
3	(Moldova) (Botswana)	Sergei Cupțov / Artiom Podgainii; Phenyo Matong / Bokang Setshogo	6; 4	1; 6	3; 6

=== Malta vs. Djibouti ===
Malta
3
Lugogo Tennis Club, Kampala, Uganda
5 March 2005
Clay

Djibouti
0

			1	2	3
1	(Malta) (Djibouti)	Marcus Delicata; Abdi-Fatah Abdourahman-Youssouf	6; 1	6; 0
2	(Malta) (Djibouti)	Daniel Ceross; Kadar Mogueh	6; 1	6; 1
3	(Malta) (Djibouti)	Matthew Asciak / Daniel Ceross; Abdi-Fatah Abdourahman-Youssouf / Kadar Mogueh	6; 1	6; 1

=== Botswana vs. Djibouti ===
Botswana
3
Lugogo Tennis Club, Kampala, Uganda
6 March 2005
Clay

Djibouti
0

			1	2	3
1	(Botswana) (Djibouti)	Bino Rasedisa; Fahim Osman-Obsien	6; 1	6; 0
2	(Botswana) (Djibouti)	Bokang Setshogo; Kadar Mogueh	6; 0	6; 0
3	(Botswana) (Djibouti)	Bino Rasedisa / Tshepang Tlhankane; Abdi-Fatah Abdourahman-Youssouf / Fahim Osman-Obsien	6; 3	6; 1

=== Benin vs. Malta ===
Benin
3
Lugogo Tennis Club, Kampala, Uganda
6 March 2005
Clay

Malta
0

			1	2	3
1	(Benin) (Malta)	Jean Segodo; Matthew Asciak	7^{7} 6^{4}	6; 1
2	(Benin) (Malta)	Armand Segodo; Daniel Ceross	6; 4	6; 4
3	(Benin) (Malta)	Jean Segodo / Romain Setomey; Daniel Ceross / Marcus Delicata	6; 3	6; 4

== Pool B ==
	Pool B	AND	RWA	AZE	SEN	UGA	MRI
1	Andorra (5–0)		2–1	3–0	3–0	3–0	3–0
2	Rwanda (3–2)	1–2		1–2	2–1	2–1	3–0
3	Azerbaijan (3–2)	0–3	2–1		1–2	2–1	3–0
4	Senegal (3–2)	0–3	1–2	2–1		2–1	2–1
5	Uganda (1–4)	0–3	1–2	1–2	1–2		2–1
6	Mauritius (0–5)	0–3	0–3	0–3	1–2	1–2	

Andorra and Rwanda promoted to Group III in 2006.

=== Azerbaijan vs. Uganda ===
Azerbaijan
2
Lugogo Tennis Club, Kampala, Uganda
1 March 2005
Clay

Uganda
1

			1	2	3
1	(Azerbaijan) (Uganda)	Farid Shirinov; Godfrey Uzunga	7^{8} 6^{6}	7; 5
2	(Azerbaijan) (Uganda)	Fakhraddin Shirinov; Patrick Olobo	6^{4} 7^{7}	5; 7
3	(Azerbaijan) (Uganda)	Fakhraddin Shirinov / Farid Shirinov; Cedric Babu / Patrick Olobo	7^{8} 6^{6}	7^{7} 6^{2}

=== Rwanda vs. Senegal ===
Rwanda
2
Lugogo Tennis Club, Kampala, Uganda
1 March 2005
Clay

Senegal
1

			1	2	3
1	(Rwanda) (Senegal)	Jean-Claude Gasigwa; Cheikh Salif Kanté	6; 3	7^{8} 6^{6}
2	(Rwanda) (Senegal)	Eric Hagenimana; Youssou Berthé	6; 0	6; 3
3	(Rwanda) (Senegal)	Eric Hagenimana / Alain Hakizimana; Youssou Berthé / Cheikh Salif Kanté	6; 1	3; 6	3; 6

=== Andorra vs. Mauritius ===
Andorra
3
Lugogo Tennis Club, Kampala, Uganda
1 March 2005
Clay

Mauritius
0

			1	2	3
1	(Andorra) (Mauritius)	Jean-Baptiste Poux-Gautier; Olivier Rey	6; 0	6; 1
2	(Andorra) (Mauritius)	Pau Gerbaud-Farras; Jerome Mamet	6; 1	6; 0
3	(Andorra) (Mauritius)	Jean-Baptiste Poux-Gautier / Axel Rabanal; Olivier Rey / Mathieu Vallet	6; 2	6; 2

=== Azerbaijan vs. Senegal ===
Azerbaijan
1
Lugogo Tennis Club, Kampala, Uganda
2 March 2005
Clay

Senegal
2

			1	2	3
1	(Azerbaijan) (Senegal)	Talat Rahimov; Cheikh Salif Kanté	5; 7	0; 6
2	(Azerbaijan) (Senegal)	Fakhraddin Shirinov; Youssou Berthé	4; 6	6; 1	1; 6
3	(Azerbaijan) (Senegal)	Talat Rahimov / Farid Shirinov; Omar Kâ / Mamadou Seye	6; 1	6; 4

=== Rwanda vs. Andorra ===
Rwanda
1
Lugogo Tennis Club, Kampala, Uganda
2 March 2005
Clay

Andorra
2

			1	2	3
1	(Rwanda) (Andorra)	Jean-Claude Gasigwa; Jean-Baptiste Poux-Gautier	1; 6	1; 6
2	(Rwanda) (Andorra)	Eric Hagenimana; Pau Gerbaud-Farras	6; 4	6; 3
3	(Rwanda) (Andorra)	Eric Hagenimana / Alain Hakizimana; Pau Gerbaud-Farras / Jean-Baptiste Poux-Gautier	2; 6	0; 6

=== Mauritius vs. Uganda ===
Mauritius
1
Lugogo Tennis Club, Kampala, Uganda
2 March 2005
Clay

Uganda
2

			1	2	3
1	(Mauritius) (Uganda)	Olivier Rey; Godfrey Uzunga	3; 6	0; 6
2	(Mauritius) (Uganda)	Mathieu Vallet; Patrick Olobo	0; 6	2; 6
3	(Mauritius) (Uganda)	Jerome Mamet / Olivier Rey; James Odongo / Godfrey Uzunga	6; 1	4; 6	6; 2

=== Azerbaijan vs. Mauritius ===
Azerbaijan
3
Lugogo Tennis Club, Kampala, Uganda
3 March 2005
Clay

Mauritius
0

			1	2	3
1	(Azerbaijan) (Mauritius)	Farid Shirinov; Mathieu Vallet	6; 0	6; 2
2	(Azerbaijan) (Mauritius)	Fakhraddin Shirinov; Jerome Mamet	6; 3	6; 0
3	(Azerbaijan) (Mauritius)	Ramin Hajiyev / Farid Shirinov; Olivier Rey / Mathieu Vallet	6; 3	6^{3} 7^{7}	7; 5

=== Rwanda vs. Uganda ===
Rwanda
2
Lugogo Tennis Club, Kampala, Uganda
3 March 2005
Clay

Uganda
1

			1	2	3
1	(Rwanda) (Uganda)	Jean-Claude Gasigwa; Godfrey Uzunga	6; 1	6^{5} 7^{7}	5; 5	retired
2	(Rwanda) (Uganda)	Eric Hagenimana; Patrick Olobo	6; 4	6; 2
3	(Rwanda) (Uganda)	Eric Hagenimana / Alain Hakizimana; Cedric Babu / Patrick Olobo	6; 0	6; 3

=== Andorra vs. Senegal ===
Andorra
3
Lugogo Tennis Club, Kampala, Uganda
3 March 2005
Clay

Senegal
0

			1	2	3
1	(Andorra) (Senegal)	Jean-Baptiste Poux-Gautier; Cheikh Salif Kanté	6; 0	6; 0
2	(Andorra) (Senegal)	Pau Gerbaud-Farras; Youssou Berthé	6; 1	6; 1
3	(Andorra) (Senegal)	Jean-Baptiste Poux-Gautier / Axel Rabanal; Youssou Berthé / Cheikh Salif Kanté	6; 4	2; 6	6; 0

=== Azerbaijan vs. Andorra ===
Azerbaijan
0
Lugogo Tennis Club, Kampala, Uganda
4 March 2005
Clay

Andorra
3

			1	2	3
1	(Azerbaijan) (Andorra)	Ramin Hajiyev; Jean-Baptiste Poux-Gautier	0; 6	0; 6
2	(Azerbaijan) (Andorra)	Fakhraddin Shirinov; Pau Gerbaud-Farras	0; 6	0; 6
3	(Azerbaijan) (Andorra)	Ramin Hajiyev / Talat Rahimov; Pau Gerbaud-Farras / Axel Rabanal	2; 6	2; 6

=== Rwanda vs. Mauritius ===
Rwanda
3
Lugogo Tennis Club, Kampala, Uganda
4 March 2005
Clay

Mauritius
0

			1	2	3
1	(Rwanda) (Mauritius)	Eric Hagenimana; Olivier Rey	6; 3	6; 2
2	(Rwanda) (Mauritius)	Alain Hakizimana; Jerome Mamet	6; 0	6; 1
3	(Rwanda) (Mauritius)	Eric Hagenimana / Alain Hakizimana; Olivier Rey / Mathieu Vallet	6; 2	6; 2

=== Senegal vs. Uganda ===
Senegal
2
Lugogo Tennis Club, Kampala, Uganda
4 March 2005
Clay

Uganda
1

			1	2	3
1	(Senegal) (Uganda)	Cheikh Salif Kanté; James Odongo	6; 3	6; 1
2	(Senegal) (Uganda)	Youssou Berthé; Patrick Olobo	6; 0	6; 3
3	(Senegal) (Uganda)	Youssou Berthé / Cheikh Salif Kanté; Cedric Babu / Patrick Olobo	6; 4	3; 6	4; 6

=== Azerbaijan vs. Rwanda ===
Azerbaijan
2
Lugogo Tennis Club, Kampala, Uganda
5 March 2005
Clay

Rwanda
1

			1	2	3
1	(Azerbaijan) (Rwanda)	Farid Shirinov; Jean-Claude Gasigwa	6; 4	6; 3
2	(Azerbaijan) (Rwanda)	Fakhraddin Shirinov; Eric Hagenimana	2; 6	2; 6
3	(Azerbaijan) (Rwanda)	Fakhraddin Shirinov / Farid Shirinov; Eric Hagenimana / Alain Hakizimana	6^{4} 7^{7}	7^{8} 6^{6}	6; 3

=== Andorra vs. Uganda ===
Andorra
3
Lugogo Tennis Club, Kampala, Uganda
5 March 2005
Clay

Uganda
0

			1	2	3
1	(Andorra) (Uganda)	Jean-Baptiste Poux-Gautier; James Odongo	6; 1	6; 0
2	(Andorra) (Uganda)	Pau Gerbaud-Farras; Patrick Olobo	6; 0	6; 2
3	(Andorra) (Uganda)	Jean-Baptiste Poux-Gautier / Axel Rabanal; Cedric Babu / Patrick Olobo	6; 3	6; 3

=== Mauritius vs. Senegal ===
Mauritius
1
Lugogo Tennis Club, Kampala, Uganda
5 March 2005
Clay

Senegal
2

			1	2	3
1	(Mauritius) (Senegal)	Olivier Rey; Omar Kâ	6; 0	7^{7} 6^{3}
2	(Mauritius) (Senegal)	Mathieu Vallet; Youssou Berthé	1; 6	1; 6
3	(Mauritius) (Senegal)	Jerome Mamet / Olivier Rey; Youssou Berthé / Cheikh Salif Kanté	2; 6	3; 6
