= Cross-country skiing at the 2011 European Youth Olympic Winter Festival =

Cross country skiing at the 2011 European Youth Olympic Winter Festival
- Venue: Vesec, Liberec
- Date: 14–18 February

Cross-country skiing at the 2011 European Youth Winter Olympic Festival was held from 13 to 18 February 2011. It was held at the Cross Country Venue Vesec at Liberec, Czech Republic.

== Results ==
=== Medal table ===
Rank	Nation	Gold	Silver	Bronze	Total
1	Norway (NOR)	2	2	2	6
2	Sweden (SWE)	2	1	1	4
3	Finland (FIN)	2	0	0	2
4	Germany (GER)	1	2	1	4
5	Russia (RUS)	0	1	2	3
6	Slovenia (SLO)	0	1	0	1
7	Austria (AUT)	0	0	1	1
Totals (7 entries)		7	7	7	21

=== Men's events ===
Event	Gold		Silver		Bronze	
7.5 km Freestyle	Martin Weisheit (GER)	15:47.9	Daniel Herzog (GER)	15:49.7	Roman Tarasov (RUS)	15:51.5
10 km Classic	Antti Ojansivu (FIN)	27:38.7	Magnus Stensas (NOR)	27:57.3	Magnus Stensås (NOR)	27:59.6
Sprint	Christoffer Lindvall (FIN)		Artem Maltsev (RUS)		Lennart Metz (GER)	

=== Women's events ===
Event	Gold		Silver		Bronze	
5 km Freestyle	Hilde Losgård Landheim (NOR)	11:27.7	Lea Einfalt (SVN)	11:46.1	Sofia Henriksson (SWE)	11:46.7
7.5 km Classic	Sofia Henriksson (SWE)	24:29.7	Thea Krokan Murud (NOR)	24:57.1	Hilde Losgård Landheim (NOR)	25:02.9
Sprint	Stina Nilsson (SWE)		Sofia Henriksson (SWE)		Nathalie Schwartz (AUT)	

=== Mixed events ===
Event	Gold		Silver		Bronze	
Relay	Norway (NOR); Magnus Stensås; Thea Krokan Murud; Håvard Solås Taugbøl; Hilde Losgård Landheim	46:41.9	Germany (GER); Daniel Herzog; Eva Wolf; Martin Weisheit; Laura Gimmler	47:15.1	Russia (RUS); Artem Maltsev; Evgeniya Oshchepkova; Roman Tarasov; Liliia Vasileva	47:20.8
