= Engh =

Engh is a surname. Notable people with the surname include:

- Inga Bejer Engh (born 1970), Norwegian jurist and prosecutor
- John Engh (1915–1996), Norwegian architect, most known for his innovative work in stone and concrete
- M. J. Engh (born 1933), science fiction author and independent Roman scholar
- Michael Engh (born 1949), American Jesuit, academic and historian
- Odd Arne Engh (born 1951), Norwegian Nordic combined skier
