= Jacob Melskens =

Danish tennis player

- Country (sports): Denmark
- Born: 20 March 1985 (age 40); Rungsted, Denmark
- Prize money: $12,186

Singles
- Highest ranking: No. 773 (20 Mar 2006)

Doubles
- Highest ranking: No. 535 (16 Oct 2006)

Jacob Melskens (born 20 March 1985) is a Danish former tennis player, who represented Denmark in the Davis Cup.

== Tennis career ==
Melskens played in four Davis Cup ties for Denmark, making his debut in 2005 during the Group III play-off against Bosnia and Herzegovina. During his Davis Cup career, he won his one singles match and 3 of the 4 doubles matches that he played.

Melskens mainly participated on the Futures circuit and partnering with Rasmus Nørby, won one Futures doubles title.

== ITF Futures titles ==
=== Doubles: 1 ===
No.	Date	Tournament	Tier	Surface	Partner	Opponents	Score
1.	Jun 2007	Norway F2, Gausdal	Futures	Hard	(Denmark) Rasmus Nørby	(South Africa) Heinrich Heyl (Iceland) Arnar Sigurdsson	6–3, 6–4

== See also ==
- List of Denmark Davis Cup team representatives
