= Biathlon at the 2011 European Youth Olympic Winter Festival =

- Venue: Břízky, Jablonec nad Nisou
- Date: 15–18 February

Biathlon at the 2011 European Youth Winter Olympic Festival was held from 13 to 18 February 2011. It was held at the Biathlon Venue at Jablonec nad Nisou, Czech Republic.

== Results ==
=== Medal table ===
| Rank | Nation | Gold | Silver | Bronze | Total |
|---|---|---|---|---|---|
| 1 | Germany (GER) | 4 | 2 | 2 | 8 |
| 2 | Norway (NOR) | 1 | 2 | 1 | 4 |
| 3 | France (FRA) | 0 | 1 | 1 | 2 |
| 4 | Russia (RUS) | 0 | 0 | 1 | 1 |
| Totals (4 entries) | | 5 | 5 | 5 | 15 |

=== Men's events ===
| Event | Gold | | Silver | | Bronze | |
|---|---|---|---|---|---|---|
| 12.5 km Individual | Matthias Dorfer (GER) | 38:48,8 (1+1+0+0) | Johannes Thingnes Bø (NOR) | 40:15,7 (1+1+1+2) | Roman Rees (GER) | 40:20,2 (1+1+1+1) |
| 7.5 km Sprint | Johannes Thingnes Bø (NOR) | 21:18,5 (3+1) | Roman Rees (GER) | 21:20,2 (1+1) | Alexander Ketzer (GER) | 21:29,1 (0+1) |

=== Women's events ===
| Event | Gold | | Silver | | Bronze | |
|---|---|---|---|---|---|---|
| 10 km Individual | Laura Dahlmeier (GER) | 36:43,6 (0+1+0+1) | Anais Chevalier (FRA) | 37:58,6 (1+0+1+0) | Uliana Kaysheva (RUS) | 39:22,9 (2+1+0+0) |
| 6 km Sprint | Laura Dahlmeier (GER) | 19:00,4 (0+0) | Julia Bartolmaes (GER) | 19:26,1 (0+0) | Hilde Fenne (NOR) | 19:34,4 (0+2) |

=== Mixed events ===
| Event | Gold | | Silver | | Bronze | |
|---|---|---|---|---|---|---|
| Relay | Germany (GER); Julia Bartolmaes; Laura Dahlmeier; Roman Rees; Matthias Dorfer | 1:28:46,2 (0+11) | Norway (NOR); Hilde Fenne; Rikke Andersen; Aasmund Steien; Johannes Thingnes Bø | 1:33:40,1 (6+16) | France (FRA); Laurane Sauvage; Anais Chevalier; Clément Dumon; Florian Rivot | 1:34:12,1 (1+13) |
