= Snowboarding at the 2011 European Youth Olympic Winter Festival =

- Venue: Rejdice Snowpark, Kořenov
- Date: 15–17 February

Snowboarding at the 2011 European Youth Winter Olympic Festival was held from 13 to 17 February 2011. It was held at the Snowboard Venue at Kořenov, Czech Republic.

== Results ==
=== Medal table ===
Rank	Nation	Gold	Silver	Bronze	Total
1	Italy (ITA)	2	1	0	3
2	Switzerland (SUI)	1	0	2	3
3	Czech Republic (CZE)	1	0	0	1
4	Austria (AUT)	0	2	0	2
5	France (FRA)	0	1	0	1
6	Germany (GER)	0	0	1	1
6	Russia (RUS)	0	0	1	1
Totals (7 entries)		4	4	4	12

=== Men's events ===
Event	Gold	Silver	Bronze
Snowboard Cross	Matteo Menconi (ITA)	Maurizio Bormolini (ITA)	Timon Renfer (SUI)
Parallel Giant Slalom	Luca Tresoldi (ITA)	Sandro Butollo (AUT)	Valery Kolegov (RUS)

=== Women's events ===
Event	Gold	Silver	Bronze
Snowboard Cross	Caroline Weibel (SUI)	Chloe Trespeuch (FRA)	Jenny Pleisch (SUI)
Parallel Giant Slalom	Ester Ledecka (CZE)	Tanja Brugger (AUT)	Cheyenne Loch (GER)
