= Thea Krokan Murud =

Norwegian cross-country skier

Personal information
- Nationality: Norway
- Born: 6 June 1994 (age 32)

Sport
- Sport: Skiing
- Club: Søre Ål IL

World Cup career
- Seasons: 5 – (2015–2019)
- Indiv. starts: 18
- Indiv. podiums: 0
- Indiv. wins: 0
- Team starts: 0
- Overall titles: 0 – (51st in 2018)
- Discipline titles: 0
Medal record
Women's cross-country skiing
Representing Norway
U23 World Championships
Silver medal – second place	2017 Park City	Individual sprint
- Updated on 30 December 2021

Thea Krokan Murud (born 6 June 1994) is a Norwegian cross-country skier.

She participated at the 2011 European Youth Olympic Festival, winning one silver medal in the 7.5 kilometres; then at the 2012 Nordic Junior World Ski Championships, the 2016 Nordic Junior World Ski Championships (U23) and finally at the 2017 Nordic Junior World Ski Championships (U23), where she took the silver medal in the sprint.

She made her World Cup debut in March 2015 in Drammen, finishing in 49th place in the sprint prologue. She collected her first World Cup points in the March 2017 Drammen sprint, and reached the top 10 for the first time on home ground in December 2017 in Lillehammer (10 kilometres).

She represents the sports club Søre Ål IL. As an athlete she raced for Lillehammer IF in her teenage years. As an athlete she finished 14th at the 2011 World Youth Championships and 9th at the 2011 European Junior Championships, both in the 3000 metres. Her personal best times were 4:30.31 minutes in the 1500 metres and 9:45.90 minutes in the 3000 metres, both achieved in 2011.

== Cross-country skiing results ==
All results are sourced from the International Ski Federation (FIS).

=== World Cup ===
==== Season standings ====
Season	Age	Discipline standings				Ski Tour standings			
Season	Age	Overall	Distance	Sprint	U23	Nordic Opening	Tour de Ski	World Cup Final	Ski Tour Canada
2015	20	NC	—	NC	NC	—	—	—N/a	—N/a
2016	21	NC	NC	NC	NC	—	—	—N/a	—
2017	22	103	NC	76	20	—	—	—	—N/a
2018	23	51	52	27	—N/a	—	DNF	—	—N/a
2019	24	NC	NC	NC	—N/a	DNF	—	—	—N/a
