= Ski jumping at the 2011 European Youth Olympic Winter Festival =

- Venue: Ještěd ski jumping hills
- Date: 15–17 February

Ski jumping at the 2011 European Youth Winter Olympic Festival was held from 13 to 17 February 2011. It was held at the Ski Jumping Venue Ještěd at Liberec, Czech Republic.

== Results ==
=== Medal table ===
| Rank | Nation | Gold | Silver | Bronze | Total |
|---|---|---|---|---|---|
| 1 | Finland (FIN) | 1 | 1 | 0 | 2 |
| 2 | Poland (POL) | 1 | 0 | 0 | 1 |
| 3 | Austria (AUT) | 0 | 1 | 0 | 1 |
| 4 | Germany (GER) | 0 | 0 | 1 | 1 |
| 4 | Norway (NOR) | 0 | 0 | 1 | 1 |
| Totals (5 entries) | | 2 | 2 | 2 | 6 |

=== Events ===
| Event | Gold | | Silver | | Bronze | |
|---|---|---|---|---|---|---|
| Individual | Jarkko Määttä (FIN) | 294.5 | Ulrich Wohlgenannt (AUT) | 268.5 | Mats Berggaard (NOR) | 261.0 |
| Team | Poland (POL); Krzysztof Biegun; Krzysztof Kojzar; Aleksander Zniszczoł; Klemens Murańka | 913.5 | Finland (FIN); Miika Ylipulli; Miika Taskinen; Juho Ojala; Jarkko Määttä | 913.0 | Germany (GER); Michael Herrmann; Ludwig Pohle; Michael Zachrau; Florian Menz | 902.5 |
