= Omar Kâ =

Senegalese tennis player

- Country (sports): Senegal
- Born: June 5, 1988 (age 37)
- Prize money: $606

Singles
- Career record: 0–0
- Career titles: 0; 0 Challenger, 0 Futures

Doubles
- Career record: 0–0
- Career titles: 0; 0 Challenger, 0 Futures

Team competitions
- Davis Cup: 0–2
Medal record
Representing Senegal
Men's Tennis
African Games
Bronze medal – third place	2015 Brazzaville	Doubles

Omar Kâ (born June 5, 1988) is a former Senegalese tennis player.

Kâ won bronze medal with Yannick Languina at the 2015 African Games men's doubles tennis event. Kâ has a career high ITF juniors ranking of 1,562 achieved on 17 January 2005.

Kâ has represented Senegal at Davis Cup, where he has a win-loss record of 0–2.

== Davis Cup ==
=== Participations: (0–2) ===
Group membership World Group (0–0) WG Play-off (0–0) Group I (0–0) Group II (0–0) Group III (0–0) Group IV (0–2)	Matches by surface Hard (0–0) Clay (0–2) Grass (0–0) Carpet (0–0)	Matches by type Singles (0–1) Doubles (0–1)

- ▲ ▼ indicates the outcome of the Davis Cup match followed by the score, date, place of event, the zonal classification and its phase, and the court surface.

Rubber outcome	No.	Rubber	Match type (partner if any)	Opponent nation	Opponent player(s)	Score
▲2–1; 2 March 2005; Lugogo Tennis Club, Kampala, Uganda; Euro/Africa Zone Group IV Round Robin; Clay surface
Defeat	1	III	Doubles (with Mamadou Seye) (dead rubber)	Azerbaijan	Talat Rahimov / Farid Shirinov	1–6, 4–6
▲2–1; 5 March 2005; Lugogo Tennis Club, Kampala, Uganda; Euro/Africa Zone Group IV Round Robin; Clay surface
Defeat	2	I	Singles	Mauritius	Olivier Rey	0–6, 6–7^{(3–7)}
