= Søre Ål IL =

Ski club in Lillehammer Norway

Logo.

Søre Ål Idrettslag is a Norwegian skiing club from Søre Ål, Lillehammer, Norway.

The club was founded in 1944.

Cross-country skiers Brit Pettersen Tofte and Thea Krokan Murud represented the club, so did the Nordic combined skiers Odd Arne Engh and Mikko Kokslien as well as the ski jumper Robert Johansson.
