= Rasmus Nørby =

Danish tennis player

- Country (sports): Denmark
- Born: 10 September 1982 (age 42); Hjørring, Denmark
- Height: 1.83 m (6 ft 0 in)
- Turned pro: 2001
- Plays: Right-handed
- Prize money: $41,854

Singles
- Career record: 1–3
- Highest ranking: No. 538 (8 Oct 2007)

Doubles
- Career record: 2–2
- Career titles: 0; 2 Challengers
- Highest ranking: No. 267 (11 Feb 2008)

Rasmus Nørby (born 10 September 1982) is a former tennis player from Denmark.

== Tennis career ==
Nørby made his debut for the Danish Davis Cup team in 2003 against Tunisia and played in ten Davis Cup ties. During his Davis Cup career, he won 6 of the 8 singles matches and 4 of the 6 doubles matches that he played.

Nørby mainly participated on the ATP Challenger Tour and the Futures circuit. He achieved most of his success as a doubles player and won 2 Challenger titles and 14 Futures titles. He also won one singles title on the Futures circuit.

== ATP Challenger and ITF Futures titles ==
=== Singles: 1 ===
Legend
ATP Challenger (0)
ITF Futures (1)

No.	Date	Tournament	Tier	Surface	Opponent	Score
1.	Jun 2007	Norway F2, Gausdal	Futures	Hard	(Denmark) Martin Pedersen	6–3, 4–6, 7–6^{(7–5)}

=== Doubles: 16 ===
Legend
ATP Challenger (2)
ITF Futures (14)

No.	Date	Tournament	Tier	Surface	Partner	Opponents	Score
1.	Jan 2004	Germany F3, Oberhaching	Futures	Hard (i)	(Denmark) Frederik Nielsen	(Poland) Łukasz Kubot (Slovakia) Igor Zelenay	6–4, 6–7^{(6–8)}, 6–0
2.	Jun 2004	Finland F1, Savitaipale	Futures	Clay	(Denmark) Frederik Nielsen	(Czech Republic) Petr Dezort (Czech Republic) Adam Vejmělka	6–3, 3–6, 6–3
3.	Jun 2004	Finland F2, Vierumäki	Futures	Clay	(Denmark) Frederik Nielsen	(Netherlands) Bart Beks (Netherlands) Rick Schalkers	7–6^{(7–2)}, 6–3
4.	Jul 2004	Denmark F1, Helsingør	Futures	Clay	(Denmark) Frederik Nielsen	(Sweden) Johan Brunström (Sweden) Alexander Hartman	6–3, 6–3
5.	Jul 2004	Denmark F2, Hørsholm	Futures	Clay	(Denmark) Frederik Nielsen	(Italy) Andrea Arnaboldi (France) Nicolas Tourte	6–3, 6–0
6.	Sep 2005	Spain F23, Madrid	Futures	Hard	(Denmark) Frederik Nielsen	(Spain) Jorge Jiménez-Letrado (Spain) Marcos Jiménez-Letrado	6–2, 6–4
7.	Jan 2006	Germany F1, Nußloch	Futures	Carpet (i)	(Denmark) Frederik Nielsen	(Germany) Philipp Marx (Germany) Torsten Popp	6–3, 7–6^{(7–3)}
8.	Apr 2006	Sweden F1, Malmö	Futures	Hard (i)	(Denmark) Frederik Nielsen	(Sweden) Robert Gustafsson (Sweden) Rickard Holmström	6–3, 6–4
9.	Apr 2006	Sweden F2, Linköping	Futures	Carpet (i)	(Denmark) Frederik Nielsen	(Sweden) Ervin Eleskovic (Sweden) Carl Henrik Hansen	7–5, 6–4
10.	Jun 2006	Ireland F1, Limerick	Futures	Carpet	(Denmark) Frederik Nielsen	(United States) Troy Hahn (United States) Brian Wilson	6–2, 6–2
11.	Nov 2006	Tunisia F4, Sfax	Futures	Hard	(Denmark) Martin Pedersen	(Denmark) Jacob Melskens (Russia) Dmitri Sitak	6–7^{(5–7)}, 6–4, 6–2
12.	Jan 2007	Great Britain F1, Sheffield	Futures	Hard (i)	(Denmark) Martin Pedersen	(Slovakia) Kamil Capkovic (Finland) Juho Paukku	6–3, 7–6^{(8–6)}
13.	Jun 2007	Norway F2, Gausdal	Futures	Hard	(Denmark) Jacob Melskens	(South Africa) Heinrich Heyl (Iceland) Arnar Sigurdsson	6–3, 6–4
14.	Jun 2007	Ireland F2, Limerick	Futures	Hard	(Denmark) Martin Pedersen	(Italy) Riccardo Ghedin (Italy) Uros Vico	7–6^{(7–3)}, 6–4
1.	Oct 2007	Kolding, Denmark	Challenger	Hard (i)	(Denmark) Frederik Nielsen	(Germany) Philipp Petzschner (Austria) Alexander Peya	4–6, 6–3, [10–8]
2.	Nov 2007	Shrewsbury, Great Britain	Challenger	Hard (i)	(Denmark) Frederik Nielsen	(United Kingdom) Edward Allinson (United Kingdom) Ian Flanagan	6–3, 6–2

== See also ==
- List of Denmark Davis Cup team representatives
