= Odd Arne Engh =

Norwegian Nordic combined skier

Odd Arne Engh (born 14 April 1951) is a Norwegian Nordic combined skier.

He was born in Fåberg Municipality, Norway and he represented the club Søre Ål IL. He competed at the 1980 Winter Olympics in Lake Placid. He was Norwegian champion in 1973.
