= Jurgens Strydom =

Namibian tennis player

- Country (sports): Namibia
- Born: 13 March 1987 (age 38); Windhoek, Namibia
- Retired: 2009
- Plays: Right-handed
- Prize money: $5,760

Singles
- Highest ranking: No. 976 (12 November 2007)

Doubles
- Highest ranking: No. 802 (30 July 2007)

Jurgens Strydom (born 13 March 1987) is a former Namibian tennis player.

== Career ==
As a junior, Strydom and his British partner Christopher Llewellyn, reached the semifinals at the 2005 Wimbledon Boys' Doubles Championships.

Strydom represented Namibia in the Davis Cup competition from 2003 until 2009. He played forty-seven rubbers in twenty-nine Davis Cup ties, winning ten of his twenty-seven singles and eight of his twenty doubles rubbers.

He reached one final on the Futures circuit, losing to Claudio Grassi at the 2007 Namibia F1 tournament, held in Windhoek. Strydom also played in one doubles final on the 2007 Futures circuit, when he and Romanian partner, Bogdan-Victor Leonte reached the final in Benin City, Nigeria.

== See also ==
- Namibian Davis Cup team representatives
