= Home Credit Arena =

Architectural structure

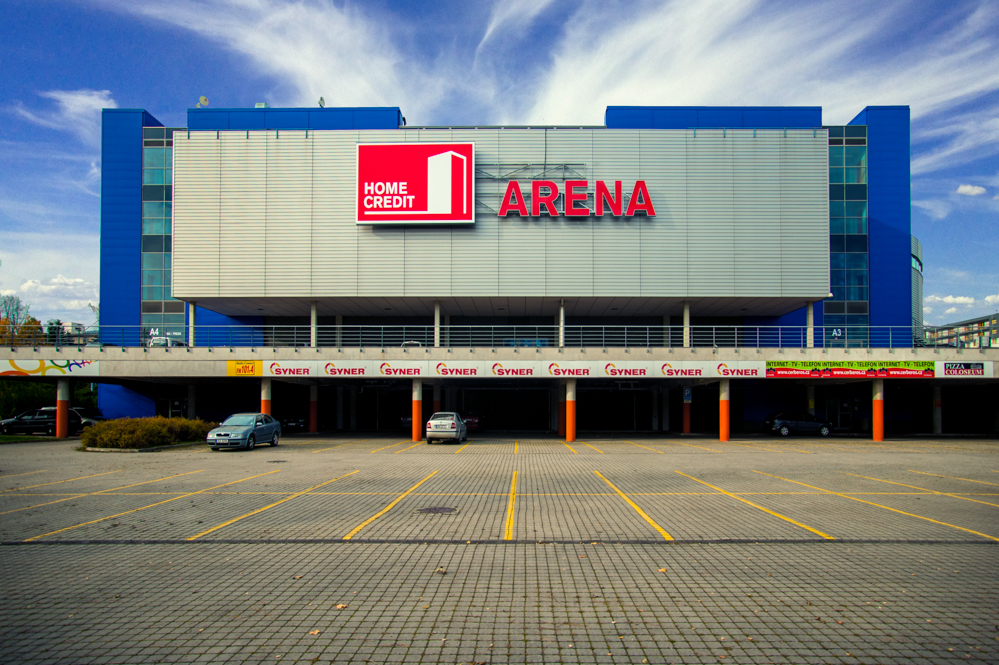
- Interactive map of Home Credit Arena
- Former names: Tipsport Arena
- Location: Jeronýmova 570/22, Liberec, Czech Republic, 460 07
- Coordinates: 50°45′10″N 15°02′59″E
- Owner: Liberec
- Operator: SFM Liberec s.r.o.
- Capacity: Hockey: 7,250; General: 9,000
- Surface: Multi-surface

Construction
- Groundbreaking: 5 September 2003
- Opened: 8 September 2005
- Architect: Antonín Buchta

Tenants
- HC Bílí Tygři Liberec (Extraliga); BK Kondoři Liberec (basketball)

The Home Credit Arena is an indoor sporting arena located in Liberec, Czech Republic. The capacity of the arena is 9,000 people and it was built in 2005. It is currently home to the HC Bílí Tygři Liberec ice hockey team.

It hosted matches from Group B and the Relegation Round at the 2008 World Junior Ice Hockey Championships. It is also a venue for home games of Polish basketball team Turów Zgorzelec in the Eurocup and Euroleague.

In its first five years of operation, the Arena welcomed 1.4 million visitors and hosted 467 events.

== See also ==
- List of indoor arenas in the Czech Republic
