= Vesec =

- City District
- Location in the Czech Republic
- Coordinates: 50°44′20″N 15°03′58″E
- Country: Czech Republic
- Region: Liberec
- District: Liberec
- Municipality: Liberec
- First mentioned: 15th century
- Elevation: 390 m (1,280 ft)

Population (2001-03-01)
  - Total: 4,090
- Postal code: 463 12
- Website: www.liberec.cz

Vesec (Czech pronunciation: [ˈvɛsɛts]) is the 25th of the 35 districts of the city of Liberec, Czech Republic. Located in the south of Liberec, it was used for the 2009 Nordic World Ski Championship for the cross-country skiing events, after a temporary course was especially built.

== History ==
The first mention of Vesec was in the year 1412.
