= Jean-Claude Gasigwa =

Rwandan tennis player

Jean-Claude Gasigwa (8 July 1983 – 8 January 2015) was a Rwandan professional tennis player. He was a member of the Rwanda Davis Cup team before his death in 2015. He won the Kenya Open in 2008, Tanzania Open in 2011 and Uganda Open in 2009, 2012 and 2013.

== Death ==
Gasigwa collapsed and died while training at the Cercle Sportif de Kigali. He was 31.
