= Rwanda Davis Cup team =

National tennis team

The Rwanda Davis Cup tennis team represents Rwanda in Davis Cup tennis competitions and are governed by the Fédération Rwandaise de Tennis.

Rwanda currently compete in the Europe/Africa Zone of Group III. They finished second in Group B of Group IV in 2005.

== History ==
Rwanda competed in its first Davis Cup in 2001.

== Current team (2022) ==
- Bertin Karenzi
- Ernest Habiyambere
- Etienne Niyigena
- Joshua Muhire
- Junior Hakizumwami (Junior player)

== See also ==
- Davis Cup
- Rwanda Billie Jean King Cup team
