= 2010 Davis Cup Africa Zone Group III =

International tennis competition

The Europe/Africa Zone was one of the three zones of regional Davis Cup competition in 2010.

In the Europe/Africa Zone there were three different tiers, called groups, in which teams competed against each other to advance to the upper tier. Group III was divided into a European zone and an African zone. The Group III Africa tournament was held in Royal Tennis Club de Marrakech, Marrakesh, Morocco, May 5–8, on outdoor clay courts.

== Participating teams ==
- Algeria
- Benin
- Botswana
- Cameroon
- Congo
- Ivory Coast
- Ghana
- Kenya
- Madagascar
- Morocco
- Nigeria
- Rwanda
- Tunisia
- Zimbabwe

== Format ==
The fourteen teams played in four groups, in round-robin format. Each tie consisted of two singles and one doubles match, each best-of-three sets. The winners of Groups A and B and the winners of Groups C and D then played off for promotion to the Europe/Africa Zone Group II for 2011.

== Group A ==
Team	Pld	W	L	MF	MA	Pts
Morocco	2	2	0	6	0	2
Ivory Coast	2	1	1	3	3	1
Kenya	2	0	2	0	6	0

=== Ivory Coast vs. Kenya ===
Ivory Coast
3
Royal Tennis Club de Marrakech, Marrakesh, Morocco
5 May 2010
Clay

Kenya
0

			1	2	3
1	(Ivory Coast) (Kenya)	Terence Nugent; Francis Thuku Mwangi	6; 3	6; 2
2	(Ivory Coast) (Kenya)	Valentin Sanon; Gilbert Kibet	6; 0	6; 0
3	(Ivory Coast) (Kenya)	Terence Nugent / Valentin Sanon; Gilbert Kibet / Francis Thuku Mwangi	6; 2	6; 2

=== Morocco vs. Ivory Coast ===
Morocco
3
Royal Tennis Club de Marrakech, Marrakesh, Morocco
6 May 2010
Clay

Ivory Coast
0

			1	2	3
1	(Morocco) (Ivory Coast)	Rabie Chaki; Terence Nugent	7^{7} 6^{3}	6; 3
2	(Morocco) (Ivory Coast)	Reda El Amrani; Valentin Sanon	6; 3	7^{7} 6^{1}
3	(Morocco) (Ivory Coast)	Talal Ouahabi / Mehdi Ziadi; Terence Nugent / Lavry Sylvain N'Yaba	6; 2	6; 1

=== Morocco vs. Kenya ===
Morocco
3
Royal Tennis Club de Marrakech, Marrakesh, Morocco
7 May 2010
Clay

Kenya
0

			1	2	3
1	(Morocco) (Kenya)	Mehdi Ziadi; Dennis Ochieng	6; 0	6; 0
2	(Morocco) (Kenya)	Talal Ouahabi; Francis Thuku Mwangi	6; 0	6; 0
3	(Morocco) (Kenya)	Rabie Chaki / Reda El Amrani; Francis Thuku Mwangi / Yash Rawal	6; 0	6; 1

== Group B ==
Team	Pld	W	L	MF	MA	Pts
Madagascar	3	3	0	8	1	3
Zimbabwe	3	2	1	7	2	2
Botswana	3	1	2	2	7	1
Congo	3	0	3	1	8	0

=== Madagascar vs. Congo ===
Madagascar
3
Royal Tennis Club de Marrakech, Marrakesh, Morocco
5 May 2010
Clay

Congo
0

			1	2	3
1	(Madagascar) (Republic of the Congo)	Erick Counil; Alain Bemba	6; 1	6; 0
2	(Madagascar) (Republic of the Congo)	Jacob Rasolondrazana; Peity Chatrian Gnitou	6; 2	6; 1
3	(Madagascar) (Republic of the Congo)	Thierry Rajaobelina / Antso Rakotondramanga; Alain Bemba / Peity Chatrian Gnitou	6; 0	6; 2

=== Zimbabwe vs. Botswana ===
Zimbabwe
3
Royal Tennis Club de Marrakech, Marrakesh, Morocco
5 May 2010
Clay

Botswana
0

			1	2	3
1	(Zimbabwe) (Botswana)	Benjamin Lock; Lefa Ashley Sibanda	6; 0	6; 0
2	(Zimbabwe) (Botswana)	Mark Fynn; Thabiso Mabaka	6; 0	6; 0
3	(Zimbabwe) (Botswana)	Mark Fynn / Admire Mushonga; Bakang Mosinyi / Shingirai Muzondiwa	6; 1	6; 1

=== Madagascar vs. Zimbabwe ===
Madagascar
2
Royal Tennis Club de Marrakech, Marrakesh, Morocco
6 May 2010
Clay

Zimbabwe
1

			1	2	3
1	(Madagascar) (Zimbabwe)	Thierry Rajaobelina; Admire Mushonga	6; 4	6; 1
2	(Madagascar) (Zimbabwe)	Jacob Rasolondrazana; Mark Fynn	6; 4	6; 2
3	(Madagascar) (Zimbabwe)	Antso Rakotondramanga / Jacob Rasolondrazana; Mark Fynn / Admire Mushonga	6^{2} 7^{7}	6; 4	3; 6

=== Botswana vs. Congo ===
Botswana
2
Royal Tennis Club de Marrakech, Marrakesh, Morocco
6 May 2010
Clay

Congo
1

			1	2	3
1	(Botswana) (Republic of the Congo)	Lefa Ashley Sibanda; Habib-Gildas Lhebath	6; 0	6; 0
2	(Botswana) (Republic of the Congo)	Shingirai Muzondiwa; Peity Chatrian Gnitou	7; 5	3; 6	6; 3
3	(Botswana) (Republic of the Congo)	Thabiso Mabaka / Bakang Mosinyi; Alain Bemba / Peity Chatrian Gnitou	5; 7	6; 3	4; 6

=== Madagascar vs. Botswana ===
Madagascar
3
Royal Tennis Club de Marrakech, Marrakesh, Morocco
7 May 2010
Clay

Botswana
0

			1	2	3
1	(Madagascar) (Botswana)	Antso Rakotondramanga; Lefa Ashley Sibanda	6; 0	6; 1
2	(Madagascar) (Botswana)	Erick Counil; Shingirai Muzondiwa	6; 0	6; 0
3	(Madagascar) (Botswana)	Antso Rakotondramanga / Jacob Rasolondrazana; Thabiso Mabaka / Bakang Mosinyi	6; 0	6; 0

=== Zimbabwe vs. Congo ===
Zimbabwe
3
Royal Tennis Club de Marrakech, Marrakesh, Morocco
7 May 2010
Clay

Congo
0

			1	2	3
1	(Zimbabwe) (Republic of the Congo)	Benjamin Lock; Evence Kamessa	6; 1	6; 0
2	(Zimbabwe) (Republic of the Congo)	Mark Fynn; Peity Chatrian Gnitou	6; 2	6; 2
3	(Zimbabwe) (Republic of the Congo)	Mark Fynn / Admire Mushonga; Alain Bemba / Habib-Gildas Lhebath	6; 0	6; 1

== Group C ==
Team	Pld	W	L	MF	MA	Pts
Tunisia	3	3	0	9	0	3
Benin	3	2	1	4	5	2
Ghana	3	1	2	4	5	1
Cameroon	3	0	3	1	8	0

=== Tunisia vs. Benin ===
Tunisia
3
Royal Tennis Club de Marrakech, Marrakesh, Morocco
5 May 2010
Clay

Benin
0

			1	2	3
1	(Tunisia) (Benin)	Haythem Abid; Théophile Segodo	6; 1	6; 0
2	(Tunisia) (Benin)	Malek Jaziri; Loic Didavi	6; 2	6; 0
3	(Tunisia) (Benin)	Haythem Abid / Malek Jaziri; Marc Houngbo / Christophe Pognon	6; 3	6; 2

=== Ghana vs. Cameroon ===
Ghana
3
Royal Tennis Club de Marrakech, Marrakesh, Morocco
5 May 2010
Clay

Cameroon
0

			1	2	3
1	(Ghana) (Cameroon)	Mohammed Salifu; Germain Ayinda	7; 5	6; 3
2	(Ghana) (Cameroon)	Henry Adjei-Darko; Célestin Nkoueleue	6; 0	6; 0
3	(Ghana) (Cameroon)	Emmanuel Mensah / Menford Owusu; Augustin Ntouba / Étienne Teboh	7; 5	6; 1

=== Tunisia vs. Ghana ===
Tunisia
3
Royal Tennis Club de Marrakech, Marrakesh, Morocco
6 May 2010
Clay

Ghana
0

			1	2	3
1	(Tunisia) (Ghana)	Haythem Abid; Mohammed Salifu	7; 5	7^{10} 6^{8}
2	(Tunisia) (Ghana)	Malek Jaziri; Henry Adjei-Darko	6; 4	7; 5
3	(Tunisia) (Ghana)	Ouassim Derbal / Ahmed Triki; Emmanuel Mensah / Menford Owusu	6; 3	6; 3

=== Cameroon vs. Benin ===
Cameroon
1
Royal Tennis Club de Marrakech, Marrakesh, Morocco
6 May 2010
Clay

Benin
2

			1	2	3
1	(Cameroon) (Benin)	Germain Ayinda; Christophe Pognon	2; 6	4; 6
2	(Cameroon) (Benin)	Célestin Nkoueleue; Loic Didavi	6; 4	0; 6	7^{8} 6^{6}
3	(Cameroon) (Benin)	Augustin Ntouba / Étienne Teboh; Loic Didavi / Théophile Segodo	6; 4	5; 7	1; 6

=== Tunisia vs. Cameroon ===
Tunisia
3
Royal Tennis Club de Marrakech, Marrakesh, Morocco
7 May 2010
Clay

Cameroon
0

			1	2	3
1	(Tunisia) (Cameroon)	Haythem Abid; Augustin Ntouba	6; 0	6; 1
2	(Tunisia) (Cameroon)	Malek Jaziri; Germain Ayinda	6; 2	6; 0
3	(Tunisia) (Cameroon)	Ouassim Derbal / Ahmed Triki; Célestin Nkoueleue / Augustin Ntouba	6; 2	6; 3

=== Ghana vs. Benin ===
Ghana
1
Royal Tennis Club de Marrakech, Marrakesh, Morocco
7 May 2010
Clay

Benin
2

			1	2	3
1	(Ghana) (Benin)	Mohammed Salifu; Christophe Pognon	6^{5} 7^{7}	6; 1	1; 6
2	(Ghana) (Benin)	Henry Adjei-Darko; Loic Didavi	6; 0	6; 0
3	(Ghana) (Benin)	Henry Adjei-Darko / Mohammed Salifu; Loic Didavi / Christophe Pognon	6^{3} 7^{7}	7^{7} 6^{4}	3; 6

== Group D ==
Team	Pld	W	L	MF	MA	Pts
Algeria	2	2	0	5	1	2
Nigeria	2	1	1	4	2	1
Rwanda	2	0	2	0	6	0

=== Nigeria vs. Rwanda ===
Nigeria
3
Royal Tennis Club de Marrakech, Marrakesh, Morocco
5 May 2010
Clay

Rwanda
0

			1	2	3
1	(Nigeria) (Rwanda)	Abdul-Mumin Babalola; Justin Ntaberanwa	6; 2	6; 2
2	(Nigeria) (Rwanda)	Sunday Emmanuel; Olivier Nkunda	6; 3	6; 1
3	(Nigeria) (Rwanda)	Candy Idoko / Lawal Shehu; Dieu-Donne Habiyambere / Olivier Nkunda	6; 1	6; 2

=== Algeria vs. Nigeria ===
Algeria
2
Royal Tennis Club de Marrakech, Marrakesh, Morocco
6 May 2010
Clay

Nigeria
1

			1	2	3
1	(Algeria) (Nigeria)	Abdelhak Hameurlaïne; Abdul-Mumin Babalola	6; 3	6^{4} 7^{7}	2; 6
2	(Algeria) (Nigeria)	Ouassel Hared; Sunday Emmanuel	6; 2	6; 4
3	(Algeria) (Nigeria)	Ouassel Hared / Slimane Saoudi; Candy Idoko / Lawal Shehu	3; 6	7; 5	7; 5

=== Algeria vs. Rwanda ===
Algeria
3
Royal Tennis Club de Marrakech, Marrakesh, Morocco
7 May 2010
Clay

Rwanda
0

			1	2	3
1	(Algeria) (Rwanda)	Abdelhak Hameurlaïne; Dieu-Donne Habiyambere	6; 0	6; 2
2	(Algeria) (Rwanda)	Slimane Saoudi; Olivier Nkunda	6; 1	6; 1
3	(Algeria) (Rwanda)	Ahmed Ouadane / Slimane Saoudi; Mele Bizimana / Olivier Nkunda	6; 1	6; 1

== Promotion Playoffs ==
=== Morocco vs. Madagascar ===
Morocco
2
Royal Tennis Club de Marrakech, Marrakesh, Morocco
8 May 2010
Clay

Madagascar
0

			1	2	3
1	(Morocco) (Madagascar)	Rabie Chaki; Antso Rakotondramanga	6; 1	6; 4
2	(Morocco) (Madagascar)	Reda El Amrani; Jacob Rasolondrazana	6; 0	6; 1
3	(Morocco) (Madagascar)	Rabie Chaki / Reda El Amrani; Antso Rakotondramanga / Jacob Rasolondrazana				not played

=== Tunisia vs. Algeria ===
Tunisia
2
Royal Tennis Club de Marrakech, Marrakesh, Morocco
8 May 2010
Clay

Algeria
0

			1	2	3
1	(Tunisia) (Algeria)	Haythem Abid; Ouassel Hared	6; 3	6; 2
2	(Tunisia) (Algeria)	Malek Jaziri; Slimane Saoudi	6; 4	6; 2
3	(Tunisia) (Algeria)	Haythem Abid / Malek Jaziri; Ahmed Ouadane / Slimane Saoudi				not played

Morocco and Tunisia promoted to Group II for 2011.

== 5th–8th Playoff ==
=== Nigeria vs. Benin ===
Nigeria
2
Royal Tennis Club de Marrakech, Marrakesh, Morocco
8 May 2010
Clay

Benin
1

			1	2	3
1	(Nigeria) (Benin)	Abdul-Mumin Babalola; Christophe Pognon	5; 7	2; 6
2	(Nigeria) (Benin)	Sunday Emmanuel; Loic Didavi	6; 2	6; 2
3	(Nigeria) (Benin)	Candy Idoko / Lawal Shehu; Marc Houngbo / Christophe Pognon	6; 3	6; 1

=== Ivory Coast vs. Zimbabwe ===
Ivory Coast
0
Royal Tennis Club de Marrakech, Marrakesh, Morocco
8 May 2010
Clay

Zimbabwe
2

			1	2	3
1	(Ivory Coast) (Zimbabwe)	Lavry Sylvain N'Yaba; Benjamin Lock	2; 6	3; 6
2	(Ivory Coast) (Zimbabwe)	Terence Nugent; Mark Fynn	6; 4	4; 6	6^{8} 7^{10}
3	(Ivory Coast) (Zimbabwe)	Terence Nugent / Lavry Sylvain N'Yaba; Mark Fynn / Admire Mushonga				not played

== 9th–12th Playoff ==
=== Ghana vs. Rwanda ===
Ghana
3
Royal Tennis Club de Marrakech, Marrakesh, Morocco
8 May 2010
Clay

Rwanda
0

			1	2	3
1	(Ghana) (Rwanda)	Menford Owusu; Dieu-Donne Habiyambere	6; 2	5; 7	6; 0
2	(Ghana) (Rwanda)	Emmanuel Mensah; Olivier Nkunda	6; 2	6; 2
3	(Ghana) (Rwanda)	Emmanuel Mensah / Menford Owusu; Mele Bizimana / Justin Ntaberanwa	6; 2	6; 2

=== Kenya vs. Botswana ===
Kenya
3
Royal Tennis Club de Marrakech, Marrakesh, Morocco
8 May 2010
Clay

Botswana
0

			1	2	3
1	(Kenya) (Botswana)	Francis Thuku Mwangi; Thabiso Mabaka	6; 3	6; 3
2	(Kenya) (Botswana)	Gilbert Kibet; Shingirai Muzondiwa	6; 4	6; 3
3	(Kenya) (Botswana)	Dennis Ochieng / Yash Rawal; Bakang Mosinyi / Lefa Ashley Sibanda	6; 4	3; 6	6; 4

== 13th–14th Playoff ==
=== Cameroon vs. Congo ===
Cameroon
3
Royal Tennis Club de Marrakech, Marrakesh, Morocco
8 May 2010
Clay

Congo
0

			1	2	3
1	(Cameroon) (Republic of the Congo)	Augustin Ntouba; Evence Kamessa	6; 1	6; 0
2	(Cameroon) (Republic of the Congo)	Germain Ayinda; Habib-Gildas Lhebath	6; 1	6; 0
3	(Cameroon) (Republic of the Congo)	Augustin Ntouba / Étienne Teboh; Alain Bemba / Peity Chatrian Gnitou	7; 5	7; 5

== Final standings ==
Rank	Team
1	Morocco
1	Tunisia
3	Algeria
3	Madagascar
5	Nigeria
5	Zimbabwe
7	Benin
7	Ivory Coast
9	Ghana
9	Kenya
11	Botswana
11	Rwanda
13	Cameroon
14	Congo

- Morocco and Tunisia were promoted to Europe/Africa Zone Group II in 2011.
