= 2022 Ambato La Gran Ciudad =

- Date: 17–23 October
- Edition: 2nd
- Surface: Clay
- Location: Ambato, Ecuador

Champions

Singles
- (Argentina) Facundo Bagnis

Doubles
- (Argentina) Santiago Rodríguez Taverna / (Argentina) Thiago Agustín Tirante
← 2021 ·	Ambato La Gran Ciudad	· 2023 →

The 2022 Ambato La Gran Ciudad was a professional tennis tournament played on clay courts. It was the second edition of the tournament which was part of the 2022 ATP Challenger Tour. It took place in Ambato, Ecuador between 17 and 23 October 2022.

== Singles main-draw entrants ==
=== Seeds ===
Country	Player	Rank^{1}	Seed
PER	Juan Pablo Varillas	104	1
ARG	Facundo Bagnis	112	2
ARG	Juan Pablo Ficovich	144	3
ARG	Facundo Mena	159	4
ARG	Santiago Rodríguez Taverna	169	5
AUT	Gerald Melzer	222	6
SRB	Miljan Zekić	242	7
ARG	Thiago Agustín Tirante	243	8

- ^{1} Rankings are as of 10 October 2022.

=== Other entrants ===
The following players received wildcards into the singles main draw:

- (Ecuador) Andrés Andrade
- (Ecuador) Álvaro Guillén Meza
- (Ecuador) Cayetano March

The following player received entry into the singles main draw using a protected ranking:

- (United Kingdom) Jan Choinski

The following players received entry into the singles main draw as alternates:

- (France) Sean Cuenin
- (Peru) Arklon Huertas del Pino

The following players received entry from the qualifying draw:

- (India) Sriram Balaji
- (Peru) Conner Huertas del Pino
- (Japan) Kosuke Ogura
- (New Zealand) Kiranpal Pannu
- (Peru) Jorge Panta
- (Argentina) Matías Zukas

== Champions ==
=== Singles ===
- (Argentina) Facundo Bagnis def. (Brazil) João Lucas Reis da Silva 7–6^{(9–7)}, 6–4.

=== Doubles ===
- (Argentina) Santiago Rodríguez Taverna / (Argentina) Thiago Agustín Tirante def. (Zimbabwe) Benjamin Lock / (Zimbabwe) Courtney John Lock 7–6^{(13–11)}, 6–3.
