= 2022 Ambato La Gran Ciudad – Singles =

Singles
- 2022 Ambato La Gran Ciudad

Final
- Champion: (Argentina) Facundo Bagnis
- Runner-up: (Brazil) João Lucas Reis da Silva
- Score: 7–6^{(9–7)}, 6–4

Events
Singles	Doubles
← 2021 ·	Ambato La Gran Ciudad	· 2023 →

Thiago Agustín Tirante was the defending champion but lost in the semifinals to Facundo Bagnis.

Bagnis won the title after defeating João Lucas Reis da Silva 7–6^{(9–7)}, 6–4 in the final.

== Seeds ==
1. (Peru) Juan Pablo Varillas (semifinals)
2. (Argentina) Facundo Bagnis (champion)
3. (Argentina) Juan Pablo Ficovich (first round)
4. (Argentina) Facundo Mena (quarterfinals)
5. (Argentina) Santiago Rodríguez Taverna (quarterfinals)
6. (Austria) Gerald Melzer (first round)
7. (Serbia) Miljan Zekić (quarterfinals)
8. (Argentina) Thiago Agustín Tirante (semifinals)

== Draw ==
=== Key ===
- Q = Qualifier
- WC = Wild card
- LL = Lucky loser
- Alt = Alternate
- SE = Special exempt
- PR = Protected ranking
- ITF = ITF entry
- JE = Junior exempt
- w/o = Walkover
- r = Retired
- d = Defaulted
- SR = Special ranking

=== Finals ===
Semifinals
1	(Peru) Juan Pablo Varillas	4	4
(Brazil) João Lucas Reis da Silva	6	6
8	(Argentina) Thiago Agustín Tirante	3	7^{7}	6^{5}
2	(Argentina) Facundo Bagnis	6	6^{3}	7^{7}

Final
(Brazil) João Lucas Reis da Silva	6^{7}	4
2	(Argentina) Facundo Bagnis	7^{9}	6

=== Top half ===
First round
1	(Peru) JP Varillas	6	6
Q	(Japan) Kosuke Ogura	2	2
(France) G Mpetshi Perricard	6	7^{8}
PR	(United Kingdom) J Choinski	3	6^{6}
(Ecuador) R Quiroz	6	4	2
Q	(Peru) J Panta	1	6	6
(Colombia) N Mejía	7	7^{8}
6	(Austria) G Melzer	5	6^{6}
3	(Argentina) JP Ficovich	6^{9}	4
(Brazil) JL Reis da Silva	7^{11}	6
(Peru) N Álvarez	7^{7}	6
(Bolivia) M Dellien	6^{3}	3
(Argentina) Facundo Juárez	4	5
(Zimbabwe) B Lock	6	7
Q	(India) S Balaji	4	6^{9}
7	(Serbia) M Zekić	6	7^{11}

Second round
1	(Peru) JP Varillas	7^{8}	7^{7}
(France) G Mpetshi Perricard	6^{6}	6^{4}
Q	(Peru) J Panta	3	4
(Colombia) N Mejía	6	6
(Brazil) JL Reis da Silva	5	6	6
(Peru) N Álvarez	7	1	4
(Zimbabwe) B Lock	3	4
7	(Serbia) M Zekić	6	6

Quarterfinals
1	(Peru) JP Varillas	6	7^{9}
(Colombia) N Mejía	2	6^{7}
(Brazil) JL Reis da Silva	7^{7}	6
7	(Serbia) M Zekić	6^{1}	1

Semifinals
1	(Peru) JP Varillas	4	4
(Brazil) JL Reis da Silva	6	6

=== Bottom half ===
First round
8	(Argentina) TA Tirante	7^{7}	7
WC	(Ecuador) Á Guillén Meza	6^{3}	5
Q	(Peru) C Huertas del Pino	3	2
Q	(New Zealand) K Pannu	6	6
Alt	(France) Sean Cuenin	7	6^{6}	5
WC	(Ecuador) A Andrade	5	7^{8}	7
Q	(Argentina) Matías Zukas	6	1	0
4	(Argentina) F Mena	4	6	6
5	(Argentina) S Rodríguez Taverna	6	6
(Tunisia) M Jaziri	1	3
(Kazakhstan) D Popko	4	5
(Argentina) Juan Bautista Otegui	6	7
(Serbia) N Milojević	7	6
WC	(Ecuador) C March	5	1
Alt	(Peru) A Huertas del Pino	3	6^{0}
2	(Argentina) F Bagnis	6	7^{7}

Second round
8	(Argentina) TA Tirante	6	6
Q	(New Zealand) K Pannu	2	2
WC	(Ecuador) A Andrade	3	4
4	(Argentina) F Mena	6	6
5	(Argentina) S Rodríguez Taverna	6	6
(Argentina) JB Otegui	4	4
(Serbia) N Milojević	6^{6}	4
2	(Argentina) F Bagnis	7^{8}	6

Quarterfinals
8	(Argentina) TA Tirante	6	7
4	(Argentina) F Mena	2	5
5	(Argentina) S Rodríguez Taverna	4	3
2	(Argentina) F Bagnis	6	6

Semifinals
8	(Argentina) TA Tirante	3	7^{7}	6^{5}
2	(Argentina) F Bagnis	6	6^{3}	7^{7}
