= 2012 Davis Cup Africa Zone Group III =

International tennis competition

The Europe/Africa Zone is one of the three zones of regional Davis Cup competition in 2012.

In the Europe/Africa Zone there were three different tiers, called groups, in which teams competed against each other to advance to the upper tier. Group III was divided into a European zone and an African zone. The Group III Africa tournament was held in Cite Nationale Sportive D'El, Tunis, Tunisia, July 2–6, on outdoor clay courts.

== Format ==
The eight teams were split into two pools. The winner of Pool A played against the runner-up of Pool B and the winner of Pool B against the runner-up of Pool A. The two winning teams were promoted.

== Groups ==
=== Group A ===
| Team | Ties Played | Ties Won | Ties Lost | Matches Won | Matches Lost | Standing |
|---|---|---|---|---|---|---|
| Tunisia | 3 | 3 | 0 | 9 | 0 | 1 |
| Zimbabwe | 3 | 2 | 1 | 5 | 4 | 2 |
| Namibia | 3 | 1 | 2 | 2 | 7 | 3 |
| Ghana | 3 | 0 | 3 | 2 | 7 | 4 |

==== Tunisia vs. Zimbabwe ====
Tunisia
3
Cite Nationale Sportive d'El, Tunis, Tunisia
2 July 2012
Clay

Zimbabwe
0

| | | | 1 | 2 | 3 |
|---|---|---|---|---|---|
| 1 | (Tunisia) (Zimbabwe) | Haythem Abid; Benjamin Lock | 6; 3 | 6; 3 |
| 2 | (Tunisia) (Zimbabwe) | Slim Hamza; Mark Fynn | 6; 2 | 6; 1 |
| 3 | (Tunisia) (Zimbabwe) | Anis Ghorbel / Slim Hamza; Benjamin Lock / Tendai Tapfuma | 6; 3 | 6; 2 |

==== Ghana vs. Namibia ====
Ghana
1
Cite Nationale Sportive d'El, Tunis, Tunisia
2 July 2012
Clay

Namibia
2

| | | | 1 | 2 | 3 |
|---|---|---|---|---|---|
| 1 | (Ghana) (Namibia) | Enock Godi; Tukhula Jacobs | 0; 6 | 3; 6 |
| 2 | (Ghana) (Namibia) | Henry Adjei-Darko; Jean Erasmus | 6; 1 | 6; 1 |
| 3 | (Ghana) (Namibia) | Henry Adjei-Darko / Raymond Hayford; Jean Erasmus / Tukhula Jacobs | 4; 6 | 1; 6 |

==== Zimbabwe vs. Ghana ====
Zimbabwe
2
Cite Nationale Sportive d'El, Tunis, Tunisia
3 July 2012
Clay

Ghana
1

| | | | 1 | 2 | 3 |
|---|---|---|---|---|---|
| 1 | (Zimbabwe) (Ghana) | Benjamin Lock; Raymond Hayford | 6; 1 | 6; 1 |
| 2 | (Zimbabwe) (Ghana) | Mark Flynn; Henry Adjei-Darko | 2; 6 | 3; 6 |
| 3 | (Zimbabwe) (Ghana) | Benjamin Lock / Tendai Tapfuma; Henry Adjei-Darko / Raymond Hayford | 6; 3 | 6; 3 |

==== Tunisia vs. Namibia ====
Tunisia
3
Cite Nationale Sportive d'El, Tunis, Tunisia
3 July 2012
Clay

Namibia
0

| | | | 1 | 2 | 3 |
|---|---|---|---|---|---|
| 1 | (Tunisia) (Namibia) | Haythem Abid; Tukhula Jacobs | 6; 0 | 6; 2 |
| 2 | (Tunisia) (Namibia) | Slim Hamza; Jean Erasmus | 6; 2 | 6; 4 |
| 3 | (Tunisia) (Namibia) | Anis Ghorbel / Slim Hamza; Johan de Witt / Gideon van Dyk | 6; 0 | 6; 3 |

==== Zimbabwe vs. Namibia ====
Zimbabwe
3
Cite Nationale Sportive d'El, Tunis, Tunisia
4 July 2012
Clay

Namibia
0

| | | | 1 | 2 | 3 |
|---|---|---|---|---|---|
| 1 | (Zimbabwe) (Namibia) | Benjamin Lock; Tukhula Jacobs | 6; 4 | 6; 2 |
| 2 | (Zimbabwe) (Namibia) | Mark Flynn; Jean Erasmus | 7^{7} 6^{5} | 6; 4 |
| 3 | (Zimbabwe) (Namibia) | Benjamin Lock / Tendai Tapfuma; Johan de Witt / Gideon van Dyk | 6; 3 | 6; 1 |

==== Tunisia vs. Ghana ====
Tunisia
3
Cite Nationale Sportive d'El, Tunis, Tunisia
4 July 2012
Clay

Ghana
0

| | | | 1 | 2 | 3 |
|---|---|---|---|---|---|
| 1 | (Tunisia) (Ghana) | Anis Ghorbel; Raymond Hayford | 6; 1 | 6; 0 |
| 2 | (Tunisia) (Ghana) | Haythem Abid; Henry Adjei-Darko | 6; 4 | 6; 3 |
| 3 | (Tunisia) (Ghana) | Anis Ghorbel / Slim Hamza; Enock Godi / Raymond Hayford | 6; 1 | 6; 1 |

=== Group B ===
| Team | Ties Played | Ties Won | Ties Lost | Matches Won | Matches Lost | Standing |
|---|---|---|---|---|---|---|
| Benin | 3 | 3 | 0 | 8 | 1 | 1 |
| Ivory Coast | 3 | 2 | 1 | 5 | 4 | 2 |
| Kenya | 3 | 1 | 2 | 3 | 6 | 3 |
| Algeria | 3 | 0 | 3 | 2 | 7 | 4 |

==== Algeria vs. Côte d'Ivoire ====
Algeria
1
Cite Nationale Sportive d'El, Tunis, Tunisia
2 July 2012
Clay

Ivory Coast
2

| | | | 1 | 2 | 3 |
|---|---|---|---|---|---|---|
| 1 | (Algeria) (Ivory Coast) | Mohamed Hassan; Valentin Sanon | 0; 6 | 0; 6 |
| 2 | (Algeria) (Ivory Coast) | Mohamed Amine Kerroum; Terence Nugent | 2; 6 | 7^{7} 6^{5} | 7^{7} 6^{1} |
| 3 | (Algeria) (Ivory Coast) | Youcef Ghezal / Mohamed Hassan; Valentin Sanon / Aboubacar Sigue | | | | w/o |

==== Benin vs. Kenya ====
Benin
3
Cite Nationale Sportive d'El, Tunis, Tunisia
2 July 2012
Clay

Kenya
0

| | | | 1 | 2 | 3 |
|---|---|---|---|---|---|
| 1 | (Benin) (Kenya) | Tunde Segodo; Ismael Mzai | 6; 4 | 6; 2 |
| 2 | (Benin) (Kenya) | Loic Didavi; Fazal Mohamed Khan | 6; 2 | 6; 1 |
| 3 | (Benin) (Kenya) | Alexis Klegou / Tunde Segodo; Ismael Mzai / Ibrahim Yego | 6; 1 | 6; 3 |

==== Algeria vs. Kenya ====
Algeria
1
Cite Nationale Sportive d'El, Tunis, Tunisia
3 July 2012
Clay

Kenya
2

| | | | 1 | 2 | 3 |
|---|---|---|---|---|---|
| 1 | (Algeria) (Kenya) | Mohamed Hassan; Ismael Mzai | 2; 6 | 3; 6 |
| 2 | (Algeria) (Kenya) | Mohamed Amine Kerroum; Fazal Mohamed Khan | 4; 6 | 6; 2 | 6; 2 |
| 3 | (Algeria) (Kenya) | Youcef Ghezal / Mohamed Hassan; Ismael Mzai / Ibrahim Yego | 4; 6 | 0; 6 |

==== Benin vs. Côte d'Ivoire ====
Benin
2
Cite Nationale Sportive d'El, Tunis, Tunisia
3 July 2012
Clay

Ivory Coast
1

| | | | 1 | 2 | 3 |
|---|---|---|---|---|---|
| 1 | (Benin) (Ivory Coast) | Loic Didavi; Aboubacar Sigue | 3; 6 | 6; 0 | 6; 1 |
| 2 | (Benin) (Ivory Coast) | Alexis Klegou; Valentin Sanon | 6^{6} 7^{8} | 6; 2 | 1; 6 |
| 3 | (Benin) (Ivory Coast) | Loic Didavi / Alexis Klegou; Terence Nugent / Aboubacar Sigue | 6^{5} 7^{7} | 6; 2 | 7^{7} 6^{4} |

==== Algeria vs. Benin ====
Algeria
0
Cite Nationale Sportive d'El, Tunis, Tunisia
4 July 2012
Clay

Benin
3

| | | | 1 | 2 | 3 |
|---|---|---|---|---|---|
| 1 | (Algeria) (Benin) | Mohamed Hassan; Tunde Segodo | 7; 5 | 1; 6 | 5; 7 |
| 2 | (Algeria) (Benin) | Mohamed Amine Kerroum; Alexis Klegou | 0; 6 | 1; 6 |
| 3 | (Algeria) (Benin) | Mohamed Hassan / Mohamed Amine Kerroum; Loic Didavi / Théophile Segodo | 2; 6 | 2; 6 |

==== Côte d'Ivoire vs. Kenya ====
Ivory Coast
2
Cite Nationale Sportive d'El, Tunis, Tunisia
4 July 2012
Clay

Kenya
1

| | | | 1 | 2 | 3 |
|---|---|---|---|---|---|
| 1 | (Ivory Coast) (Kenya) | Aboubacar Sigue; Ismael Mzai | 2; 6 | 3; 6 |
| 2 | (Ivory Coast) (Kenya) | Terence Nugent; Fazal Mohamed Khan | 4; 6 | 6; 2 | 6; 2 |
| 3 | (Ivory Coast) (Kenya) | Aboubacar Sigue / Seydou Traore; Ismael Mzai / Ibrahim Yego | 4; 6 | 0; 6 |

== Play-offs ==
=== 1st to 4th play-off ===
==== Tunisia vs. Côte d'Ivoire ====
Tunisia
2
Cite Nationale Sportive d'El, Tunis, Tunisia
6 July 2012
Clay

Ivory Coast
0

| | | | 1 | 2 | 3 |
|---|---|---|---|---|---|---|
| 1 | (Tunisia) (Ivory Coast) | Malek Jaziri; Valentin Sanon | 6; 2 | 6; 0 |
| 2 | (Tunisia) (Ivory Coast) | Haythem Abid; Terence Nugent | 6; 1 | 6; 3 |
| 3 | (Tunisia) (Ivory Coast) | Haythem Abid / Malek Jaziri; Terence Nugent / Valentin Sanon | | | | not played |

==== Benin vs. Zimbabwe ====
Benin
2
Cite Nationale Sportive d'El, Tunis, Tunisia
6 July 2012
Clay

Zimbabwe
1

| | | | 1 | 2 | 3 |
|---|---|---|---|---|---|
| 1 | (Benin) (Zimbabwe) | Loic Didavi; Benjamin Lock | 3; 6 | 6^{5} 7^{7} |
| 2 | (Benin) (Zimbabwe) | Alexis Klegou; Mark Fynn | 6; 4 | 6; 1 |
| 3 | (Benin) (Zimbabwe) | Loic Didavi / Alexis Klegou; Benjamin Lock / Tendai Tapfuma | 6; 3 | 6; 1 |

=== 5th to 6th play-off ===
==== Namibia vs. Kenya ====
Namibia
2
Cite Nationale Sportive d'El, Tunis, Tunisia
6 July 2012
Clay

Kenya
1

| | | | 1 | 2 | 3 |
|---|---|---|---|---|---|
| 1 | (Namibia) (Kenya) | Tukhula Jacobs; Ismael Mzai | 7; 5 | 3; 6 | 2; 6 |
| 2 | (Namibia) (Kenya) | Jean Erasmus; Fazal Mohamed Khan | 7^{7} 6^{5} | 6; 3 |
| 3 | (Namibia) (Kenya) | Johan de Witt / Jean Erasmus; Ismael Mzai / Ibrahim Yego | 6; 2 | 6; 0 |

=== 7th to 8th play-off ===
==== Ghana vs. Algeria ====
Ghana
2
Cite Nationale Sportive d'El, Tunis, Tunisia
6 July 2012
Clay

Algeria
1

| | | | 1 | 2 | 3 |
|---|---|---|---|---|---|
| 1 | (Ghana) (Algeria) | Raymond Hayford; Mohamed Hassan | 4; 6 | 2; 6 |
| 2 | (Ghana) (Algeria) | Henry Adjei-Darko; Mohamed Amine Kerroum | 6; 4 | 6; 2 |
| 3 | (Ghana) (Algeria) | Enock Godi / Raymond Hayford; Youcef Ghezal / Mohamed Hassan | 6; 2 | 6; 4 |

== Final standings ==
| Rank | Team |
|---|---|
| 1 | Benin |
| 1 | Tunisia |
| 3 | Ivory Coast |
| 3 | Zimbabwe |
| 5 | Namibia |
| 6 | Kenya |
| 7 | Ghana |
| 8 | Algeria |

- Benin and Tunisia were promoted to Europe/Africa Zone Group II in 2013.
