= 2011 Davis Cup Africa Zone Group III =

International tennis competition

The Europe/Africa Zone is one of the three zones of regional Davis Cup competition in 2011.

In the Europe/Africa Zone there were three different tiers, called groups, in which teams competed against each other to advance to the upper tier. Group III was divided into a European zone and an African zone. The Group III Africa tournament was held in Smash Tennis Academy, Cairo, Egypt, July 4–9, on outdoor clay courts.

== Format ==
The ten nations were split into two pools and played in a round robin format. The group winners played one playoff game against each other to decide which team will be promoted.

== Group stage ==
=== Group A ===
- Rwanda withdrew from the competition and a walkover was given to their opponents in Group A.

Team	Pld	W	L	MF	MA	Pts
Egypt	4	4	0	12	0	4
Madagascar	4	3	1	7	5	3
Benin	4	2	2	7	5	2
Nigeria	4	1	3	4	8	1
Rwanda	4	0	4	0	12	0

==== Madagascar vs. Benin ====
Madagascar
2
Smash Tennis Academy, Cairo, Egypt
4 July 2011
clay

Benin
1

			1	2	3
1	(Madagascar) (Benin)	Lofo Ramiaramanan; Christophe Pognon	6; 4	6; 4
2	(Madagascar) (Benin)	Antso Rakotondramanga; Alexis Klegou	3; 6	2; 6
3	(Madagascar) (Benin)	Antso Rakotondramanga / Lofo Ramiaramanan; Alexis Klegou / Christophe Pognon	6; 4	6; 4

==== Egypt vs. Benin ====
Egypt
3
Smash Tennis Academy, Cairo, Egypt
5 July 2011
clay

Benin
0

			1	2	3
1	(Egypt) (Benin)	Sherif Sabry; Maglorie Yakpa	6; 1	6; 1
2	(Egypt) (Benin)	Mohamed Safwat; Alexis Klegou	7; 5	6; 2
3	(Egypt) (Benin)	Karim-Mohamed Maamoun / Sherif Sabry; Alexis Clegou / Tunde Segodo	7^{7} 6^{4}	6; 2

==== Egypt vs. Nigeria ====
Egypt
3
Smash Tennis Academy, Cairo, Egypt
6 July 2011
clay

Nigeria
0

			1	2	3
1	(Egypt) (Nigeria)	Sherif Sabry; Lawal Shehu	6; 3	6; 2
2	(Egypt) (Nigeria)	Mohamed Safwat; Abdul-Mumin Babalola	6; 2	6; 4
3	(Egypt) (Nigeria)	Sherif Sabry / Mohamed Safwat; Abdul-Mumin Babalola / Lawal Shehu	6; 2	7^{7} 6^{1}

==== Madagascar vs. Nigeria ====
Madagascar
2
Smash Tennis Academy, Cairo, Egypt
7 July 2011
clay

Nigeria
1

			1	2	3
1	(Madagascar) (Nigeria)	Jacob Rasolondrazana; Sunday Emmanuel	7; 5	6; 4
2	(Madagascar) (Nigeria)	Antso Rakotondramanga; Abdul-Mumin Babalola	5; 7	5; 7
3	(Madagascar) (Nigeria)	Antso Rakotondramanga / Lofo Ramiaramanan; Abdul-Mumin Babalola / Lawal Shehu	3; 6	6; 4	6; 3

==== Egypt vs. Madagascar ====
Egypt
3
Smash Tennis Academy, Cairo, Egypt
8 July 2011
clay

Madagascar
0

			1	2	3
1	(Egypt) (Madagascar)	Sherif Sabry; Jacob Rasolondrazana	6; 3	6; 4
2	(Egypt) (Madagascar)	Mohamed Safwat; Lofo Ramiaramanan	6; 4	4; 6	6; 1
3	(Egypt) (Madagascar)	Karim-Mohamed Maamoun / Mohamed Safwat; Antso Rakotondramanga / Jacob Rasolondrazana	6; 3	6; 3

==== Benin vs. Nigeria ====
Benin
3
Smash Tennis Academy, Cairo, Egypt
8 July 2011
clay

Nigeria
0

			1	2	3
1	(Benin) (Nigeria)	Christophe Pognon; Sunday Emmanuel	5; 7	5; 7
2	(Benin) (Nigeria)	Alexis Klegou; Abdul-Mumin Babalola	6; 2	1; 6	2; 6
3	(Benin) (Nigeria)	Tunde Segodo / Maglorie Yakpa; Abdul-Mumin Babalola / Sunday Emmanuel	1; 6	0; 6

=== Group B ===
Team	Pld	W	L	MF	MA	Pts
Algeria	4	4	0	9	3	4
Zimbabwe	4	3	1	9	3	3
Ghana	4	2	2	6	6	2
Ivory Coast	4	1	3	6	6	1
Kenya	4	0	4	0	12	0

==== Algeria vs. Kenya ====
Algeria
3
Smash Tennis Academy, Cairo, Egypt
4 July 2011
clay

Kenya
0

			1	2	3
1	(Algeria) (Kenya)	Sid Ali Akili; Dennis Ochieng	6; 1	6; 1
2	(Algeria) (Kenya)	Abdelhak Hameurlaine; Francis Thuku Mwangi	6; 0	6; 1
3	(Algeria) (Kenya)	Mohamed Amine Kerroum / Mohamed-Rebha Ouahab; Gilbert Kibet / Ismael Changawa Ruwa	6; 2	6; 2

==== Zimbabwe vs. Cote d'Ivoire ====
Zimbabwe
2
Smash Tennis Academy, Cairo, Egypt
4 July 2011
clay

Ivory Coast
1

			1	2	3
1	(Zimbabwe) (Ivory Coast)	Mark Fynn; Valentin Sanon	7; 5	6; 0
2	(Zimbabwe) (Ivory Coast)	Takanyi Garanganga; Terence Nugent	5; 7	4; 6
3	(Zimbabwe) (Ivory Coast)	Mark Fynn / Takanyi Garanganga; Terence Nugent / Aboubacar Sigue	1; 6	6; 3	7^{7} 6^{5}

==== Algeria vs. Cote d'Ivoire ====
Algeria
2
Smash Tennis Academy, Cairo, Egypt
5 July 2011
clay

Ivory Coast
1

			1	2	3
1	(Algeria) (Ivory Coast)	Sid Ali Akili; Aboubacar Sigue	7; 5	6^{8} 7^{10}	6; 4
2	(Algeria) (Ivory Coast)	Abdelhak Hameurlaine; Terence Nugent	6; 4	3; 6	2; 6
3	(Algeria) (Ivory Coast)	Abdelhak Hameurlaine / Mohamed-Redha Ouahab; Terence Nugent / Aboubacar Sigue	6^{6} 7^{8}	6; 1	6; 3

==== Ghana vs. Kenya ====
Ghana
3
Smash Tennis Academy, Cairo, Egypt
5 July 2011
clay

Kenya
0

			1	2	3
1	(Ghana) (Kenya)	Raymond Hayford; Dennis Ochieng	6; 1	6; 1
2	(Ghana) (Kenya)	Emmanuel Mensah; Francis Thuku Mwangi	6; 1	6; 0
3	(Ghana) (Kenya)	Robert Mensah Kpodo / Emmanuel Mensah; Gilbert Kibet / Francis Thuku Mwangi	6; 2	6; 1

==== Algeria vs. Ghana ====
Algeria
2
Smash Tennis Academy, Cairo, Egypt
6 July 2011
clay

Ghana
1

			1	2	3
1	(Algeria) (Ghana)	Sid Ali Akili; Raymond Hayford	7; 5	6; 1
2	(Algeria) (Ghana)	Abdelhak Hameurlaine; Emmanuel Mensah	6; 4	6; 1
3	(Algeria) (Ghana)	Mohamed Amine Kerroum / Mohamed-Redha Ouahab; Robert Mensah Kpodo / Emmanuel Mensah	5; 7	1; 6

==== Zimbabwe vs. Kenya ====
Zimbabwe
3
Smash Tennis Academy, Cairo, Egypt
6 July 2011
clay

Kenya
0

			1	2	3
1	(Zimbabwe) (Kenya)	Benjamin Lock; Gilbert Kibet	6; 1	6; 1
2	(Zimbabwe) (Kenya)	Takanyi Garanganga; Francis Thuku Mwangi	6; 1	6; 3
3	(Zimbabwe) (Kenya)	Mark Fynn / Benjamin Lock; Dennis Ochieng / Ismael Changawa Ruwa	6; 0	6; 1

==== Zimbabwe vs. Ghana ====
Zimbabwe
3
Smash Tennis Academy, Cairo, Egypt
7 July 2011
clay

Ghana
0

			1	2	3
1	(Zimbabwe) (Ghana)	Mark Fynn; Raymond Hayford	6; 0	6; 1
2	(Zimbabwe) (Ghana)	Takanyi Garanganga; Emmanuel Mensah	6; 3	6; 4
3	(Zimbabwe) (Ghana)	Mark Fynn / Benjamin Lock; Robert Mensah Kpodo / Emmanuel Mensah	6; 2	7; 5

==== Cote d'Ivoire vs. Kenya ====
Ivory Coast
3
Smash Tennis Academy, Cairo, Egypt
7 July 2011
clay

Kenya
0

			1	2	3
1	(Ivory Coast) (Kenya)	Aboubacar Sigue; Gilbert Kibet	6; 0	4; 6	6; 0
2	(Ivory Coast) (Kenya)	Terence Nugent; Dennis Ochieng	6; 2	6; 3
3	(Ivory Coast) (Kenya)	Lavry Sylvain N'Yaba / Aboubacar Sigue; Francis Thuku Mwangi / Ismael Changawa Ruwa	6; 1	4; 6	7; 5

==== Algeria vs. Zimbabwe ====
Algeria
2
Smash Tennis Academy, Cairo, Egypt
8 July 2011
clay

Zimbabwe
1

			1	2	3
1	(Algeria) (Zimbabwe)	Sid Ali Akili; Mark Fynn	6; 4	6; 4
2	(Algeria) (Zimbabwe)	Abdelhak Hameurlaine; Takanyi Garanganga	6; 4	6; 4
3	(Algeria) (Zimbabwe)	Mohamed Amine Kerroum / Mohamed-Redha Ouahab; Mark Fynn / Benjamin Lock	2; 6	3; 6

==== Ghana vs. Cote d'Ivoire ====
Ghana
2
Smash Tennis Academy, Cairo, Egypt
8 July 2011
clay

Ivory Coast
1

			1	2	3
1	(Ghana) (Ivory Coast)	Raymond Hayford; Aboubacar Sigue	7; 5	3; 6	6^{5} 7^{7}
2	(Ghana) (Ivory Coast)	Emmanuel Mensah; Lavry Sylvain N'Yaba	6; 2	6^{9} 7^{11}	6; 3
3	(Ghana) (Ivory Coast)	Robert Mensah Kpodo / Emmanuel Mensah; Lavry Sylvain N'Yaba / Aboubacar Sigue	6; 1	6; 4

== Playoffs ==
=== 1st to 4th Playoff ===
==== Zimbabwe vs. Egypt ====
Zimbabwe
0
Smash Tennis Academy, Cairo, Egypt
9 July 2011
clay

Egypt
2

			1	2	3
1	(Zimbabwe) (Egypt)	Benjamin Lock; Sherif Sabry	0; 6	3; 6
2	(Zimbabwe) (Egypt)	Takanyi Garanganga; Mohamed Safwat	2; 6	5; 7
3	(Zimbabwe) (Egypt)	Mark Fynn / Takanyi Garanganga; Sherif Sabry / Mohamed Safwat				not played

==== Madagascar vs. Algeria ====
Madagascar
2
Smash Tennis Academy, Cairo, Egypt
9 July 2011
clay

Algeria
1

			1	2	3
1	(Madagascar) (Algeria)	Jacob Rasolondrazana; Sid Ali Akili	3; 6	7; 5	6; 2
2	(Madagascar) (Algeria)	Lofo Ramiaramanan; Abdelhak Hameurlaine	6; 3	3; 6	0; 6
3	(Madagascar) (Algeria)	Antso Rakotondramanga / Lofo Ramiaramanan; Abdelhak Hameurlaine / Mohamed-Rebha Ouahab	6; 1	6; 1

=== 5th to 6th Playoff ===
==== Ghana vs. Benin ====
Ghana
0
Smash Tennis Academy, Cairo, Egypt
9 July 2011
clay

Benin
3

			1	2	3
1	(Ghana) (Benin)	Raymond Hayford; Tunde Segodo	4; 6	5; 7
2	(Ghana) (Benin)	Emmanuel Mensah; Alexis Klegou	2; 6	6; 4	1; 6
3	(Ghana) (Benin)	Japheth Anwasiba Bagerbaseh / Robert Mensah Kpodo; Tunde Segodo / Magloire Yakpa	3; 6	2; 6

=== 7th to 8th Playoff ===
==== Nigeria vs. Cote d'Ivoire ====
Nigeria
2
Smash Tennis Academy, Cairo, Egypt
9 July 2011
clay

Ivory Coast
1

			1	2	3
1	(Nigeria) (Ivory Coast)	Henry Atseye; Aboubacar Sigue	6; 4	1; 6	4; 6
2	(Nigeria) (Ivory Coast)	Lawal Shehu; Lavry Sylvain N'Yaba	6; 4	6; 1
3	(Nigeria) (Ivory Coast)	Henry Atseye / Lawal Shehu; Lavry Sylvain N'Yaba / Aboubacar Sigue	6; 1	6; 4

=== 9th to 10th play-off ===
==== Rwanda vs. Kenya ====
This match was scratched and Kenya were awarded ninth place as Rwanda withdrew from the tournament.

== Final standings ==
Rank	Team
1	Egypt
1	Madagascar
3	Algeria
3	Zimbabwe
5	Benin
6	Ghana
7	Nigeria
8	Ivory Coast
9	Kenya

- Egypt and Madagascar were promoted to Europe/Africa Zone Group II in 2012.
- Rwanda withdrew from the tournament.
