= 2022 Ambato La Gran Ciudad – Doubles =

Doubles
- 2022 Ambato La Gran Ciudad

Final
- Champions: (Argentina) Santiago Rodríguez Taverna (Argentina) Thiago Agustín Tirante
- Runners-up: (Zimbabwe) Benjamin Lock (Zimbabwe) Courtney John Lock
- Score: 7–6^{(13–11)}, 6–3

Events
Singles	Doubles
← 2021 ·	Ambato La Gran Ciudad	· 2023 →

Diego Hidalgo and Cristian Rodríguez were the defending champions but chose not to defend their title.

Santiago Rodríguez Taverna and Thiago Agustín Tirante won the title after defeating Benjamin and Courtney John Lock 7–6^{(13–11)}, 6–3 in the final.

== Seeds ==
1. (India) Sriram Balaji / (India) Jeevan Nedunchezhiyan (semifinals)
2. (Bolivia) Boris Arias / (Bolivia) Federico Zeballos (semifinals)
3. (Colombia) Nicolás Mejía / (Ecuador) Roberto Quiroz (withdrew)
4. (Zimbabwe) Benjamin Lock / (Zimbabwe) Courtney John Lock (final)

== Draw ==
=== Key ===
- Q = Qualifier
- WC = Wild card
- LL = Lucky loser
- Alt = Alternate
- SE = Special exempt
- PR = Protected ranking
- ITF = ITF entry
- JE = Junior exempt
- w/o = Walkover
- r = Retired
- d = Defaulted
- SR = Special ranking

First round
1	(India) S Balaji (India) J Nedunchezhiyan	6	7^{7}
(Ecuador) C March (Brazil) JL Reis da Silva	2	6^{3}
(Ecuador) A Andrade (United States) Tristan McCormick	6	6
(Argentina) JP Ficovich (Argentina) Matías Zukas	3	2
Alt	(United States) Colin Markes (New Zealand) K Pannu	6	6
(Tunisia) M Jaziri (Serbia) M Zekić	3	3
(Serbia) N Milojević (Kazakhstan) D Popko	6^{1}	6^{9}
(Argentina) S Rodríguez Taverna (Argentina) TA Tirante	7^{7}	7^{11}
(Peru) N Álvarez (Peru) J Panta	7	5	[10]
WC	(Ecuador) P Alvarado (Brazil) Igor Gimenez	5	7	[7]
WC	(Peru) G Bueno (Ecuador) A Guillén Meza	6	6^{5}	[9]
4	(Zimbabwe) B Lock (Zimbabwe) CJ Lock	2	7^{7}	[11]
(Peru) A Huertas del Pino (Peru) C Huertas del Pino	6	6
(Peru) S Galdós (Austria) G Melzer	3	4
(Argentina) Facundo Juárez (Argentina) Juan Bautista Otegui	4	2
2	(Bolivia) B Arias (Bolivia) F Zeballos	6	6

Quarterfinals
1	(India) S Balaji (India) J Nedunchezhiyan	w/o
(Ecuador) A Andrade (United States) T McCormick
Alt	(United States) C Markes (New Zealand) K Pannu	6^{3}	2
(Argentina) S Rodríguez Taverna (Argentina) TA Tirante	7^{7}	6
(Peru) N Álvarez (Peru) J Panta
4	(Zimbabwe) B Lock (Zimbabwe) CJ Lock	w/o
(Peru) A Huertas del Pino (Peru) C Huertas del Pino	6^{5}	4
2	(Bolivia) B Arias (Bolivia) F Zeballos	7^{7}	6

Semifinals
1	(India) S Balaji (India) J Nedunchezhiyan	6^{2}	4
(Argentina) S Rodríguez Taverna (Argentina) TA Tirante	7^{7}	6
4	(Zimbabwe) B Lock (Zimbabwe) CJ Lock	3	6	[10]
2	(Bolivia) B Arias (Bolivia) F Zeballos	6	4	[5]

Final
(Argentina) S Rodríguez Taverna (Argentina) TA Tirante	7^{13}	6
4	(Zimbabwe) B Lock (Zimbabwe) CJ Lock	6^{11}	3
