= 2009 Davis Cup Europe/Africa Zone Group IV =

International tennis competition

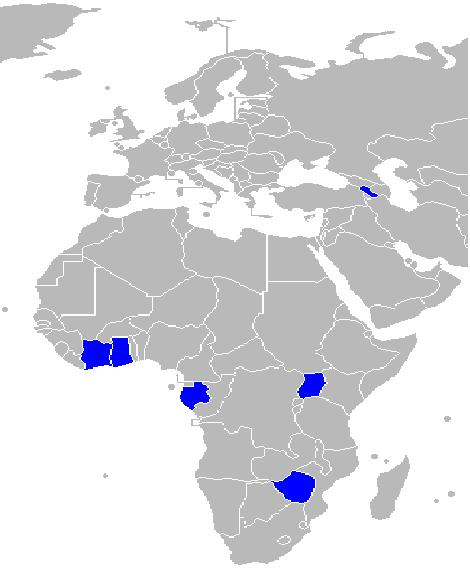
Countries participating in the 2009 Davis Cup Europe/Africa Zone Group IV

The European and African Zone is one of the three zones of regional Davis Cup competition in 2009.

In the European and African Zone there are four different groups in which teams compete against each other to advance to the next group.

== Information ==
Venue: Abidjan, Côte d'Ivoire

Surface: Hard

Dates: 29 April – 3 May

== Format ==
All seven nations will play in a Round Robin. The top four nations will be promoted to the Europe and Africa Group III in 2010. After Uganda and Gabon withdrew, the format did not change.

== Participating teams ==
- Armenia
- Cameroon
- Ivory Coast
- Ghana
- Zimbabwe
- Gabon withdrew
- Uganda withdrew

== Matches ==
		(Ghana)	(Zimbabwe)	(Ivory Coast)	(Armenia)	(Cameroon)
1	Ghana (4–0)		3–0	3–0	3–0	3–0
2	Zimbabwe (3–1)	0–3		2–1	2–1	3–0
3	Ivory Coast (2–2)	0–3	1–2		2–1	2–1
4	Armenia (1–3)	0–3	1–2	1–2		3–0
5	Cameroon (0–4)	0–3	0–3	1–2	0–3	

=== Ghana vs. Armenia ===
Ghana
3
Centre International de Tennis Arthur Ashe, Abidjan, Côte d'Ivoire
29 April 2009
hard(outdoors)

Armenia
0

			1	2	3
1	(Ghana) (Armenia)	Emmanuel Mensah; Ashot Gevorgyan	6; 4	7; 5
2	(Ghana) (Armenia)	Mohammed Salifu; Harutyun Sofyan	6; 2	6; 1
3	(Ghana) (Armenia)	Emmanuel Mensah / Mohammed Salifu; Henrik Nikoghosyan / Ashot Gevorgyan	6; 1	6; 1

=== Côte d'Ivoire vs. Cameroon ===
Ivory Coast
2
Centre International de Tennis Arthur Ashe, Abidjan, Côte d'Ivoire
29 April 2009
hard(outdoors)

Cameroon
1

			1	2	3
1	(Ivory Coast) (Cameroon)	Lavry Sylvain N'yaba; Célestin Nkoueleue	4; 6	1; 6
2	(Ivory Coast) (Cameroon)	Valentin Sanon; Germain Ayinda	6; 2	6; 1
3	(Ivory Coast) (Cameroon)	Lavry Sylvain N'yaba / Valentin Sanon; Pierre Damien Ayissi Djomo / Célestin Nkoueleue	6; 3	6; 3

=== Côte d'Ivoire vs. Armenia ===
Ivory Coast
2
Centre International de Tennis Arthur Ashe, Abidjan, Côte d'Ivoire
30 April 2009
hard(outdoors)

Armenia
1

			1	2	3
1	(Ivory Coast) (Armenia)	Lavry Sylvain N'yaba; Ashot Gevorgyan	6; 4	6; 4
2	(Ivory Coast) (Armenia)	Valentin Sanon; Harutyun Sofyan	6; 2	6; 3
3	(Ivory Coast) (Armenia)	Yeboua Koffi Etienne Bini / Akre Francis Koffi; Ashot Gevorgyan / Henrik Nikoghosyan	5; 7	7; 5	4; 6

=== Zimbabwe vs. Ghana ===
Zimbabwe
0
Centre International de Tennis Arthur Ashe, Abidjan, Côte d'Ivoire
30 April 2009
hard(outdoors)

Ghana
3

			1	2	3
1	(Zimbabwe) (Ghana)	Andrew Mawire; Emmanuel Mensah	3; 6	2; 6
2	(Zimbabwe) (Ghana)	Takanyi Garanganga; Mohammed Salifu	6; 3	6^{7} 7^{9}	1; 4	retired
3	(Zimbabwe) (Ghana)	Andrew Mawire / Mbonisi Ndimande; Emmanuel Mensah / Mohammed Salifu	3; 6	3; 6

=== Zimbabwe vs. Armenia ===
Zimbabwe
2
Centre International de Tennis Arthur Ashe, Abidjan, Côte d'Ivoire
1 May 2009
hard(outdoors)

Armenia
1

			1	2	3
1	(Zimbabwe) (Armenia)	Mbonisi Ndimande; Ashot Gevorgyan	6; 7	6; 4	6; 1
2	(Zimbabwe) (Armenia)	Takanyi Garanganga; Harutyun Sofyan	1; 6	3; 6
3	(Zimbabwe) (Armenia)	Takanyi Garanganga / Mbonisi Ndimande; Ashot Gevorgyan / Harutyun Sofyan	6; 4	6; 2

=== Ghana vs. Cameroon ===
Ghana
3
Centre International de Tennis Arthur Ashe, Abidjan, Côte d'Ivoire
1 May 2009
hard(outdoors)

Cameroon
0

			1	2	3
1	(Ghana) (Cameroon)	Emmanuel Mensah; Célestin Nkoueleue	6; 1	6; 3
2	(Ghana) (Cameroon)	Mohammed Salifu; Germain Ayinda	6; 1	6; 1
3	(Ghana) (Cameroon)	Robert Mensah Kpodo / Menford Owusu; Pierre Damien Ayissi Djomo / Agustin Ntouba	6; 4	4; 6	7; 5

=== Cameroon vs. Armenia ===
Cameroon
0
Centre International de Tennis Arthur Ashe, Abidjan, Côte d'Ivoire
2 May 2009
hard(outdoors)

Armenia
3

			1	2	3
1	(Cameroon) (Armenia)	Pierre Damien Ayissi Djomo; Ashot Gevorgyan	2; 6	3; 6
2	(Cameroon) (Armenia)	Célestin Nkoueleue; Harutyun Sofyan	3; 6	4; 6
3	(Cameroon) (Armenia)	Pierre Damien Ayissi Djomo / Agustin Ntouba; Henrik Nikoghosyan / Harutyun Sofyan	6; 2	6; 3

=== Côte d'Ivoire vs. Zimbabwe ===
Ivory Coast
1
Centre International de Tennis Arthur Ashe, Abidjan, Côte d'Ivoire
2 May 2009
hard(outdoors)

Zimbabwe
2

			1	2	3
1	(Ivory Coast) (Zimbabwe)	Lavry Sylvain N'yaba; Mbonisi Ndimande	6; 3	5; 7	2; 6
2	(Ivory Coast) (Zimbabwe)	Valentin Sanon; Andrew Mawire	6; 1	6; 1
3	(Ivory Coast) (Zimbabwe)	Lavry Sylvain N'yaba / Valentin Sanon; Andrew Mawire / Mbonisi Ndimande	6; 2	7^{7} 6^{5}

=== Zimbabwe vs. Cameroon ===
Zimbabwe
3
Centre International de Tennis Arthur Ashe, Abidjan, Côte d'Ivoire
3 May 2009
hard(outdoors)

Cameroon
0

			1	2	3
1	(Zimbabwe) (Cameroon)	Mbonisi Ndimande; Agustin Ntouba	6; 3	6; 0
2	(Zimbabwe) (Cameroon)	Andrew Mawire; Célestin Nkoueleue	6; 2	7^{7} 6^{3}
3	(Zimbabwe) (Cameroon)	Andrew Mawire / Mbonisi Ndimande; Germain Ayinda / Agustin Ntouba	6; 3	6; 1

=== Côte d'Ivoire vs. Ghana ===
Ivory Coast
0
Centre International de Tennis Arthur Ashe, Abidjan, Côte d'Ivoire
3 May 2009
hard(outdoors)

Ghana
3

			1	2	3
1	(Ivory Coast) (Ghana)	Lavry Sylvain N'yaba; Emmanuel Mensah	1; 6	4; 6
2	(Ivory Coast) (Ghana)	Valentin Sanon; Mohammed Salifu	6^{3} 7^{7}	4; 6
3	(Ivory Coast) (Ghana)	Yeboua Koffi Etienne Bini / Akre Francis Koffi; Robert Mensah Kpodo / Menford Owusu	2; 6	2; 6
