= 2021 Ambato La Gran Ciudad – Singles =

Singles
- 2021 Ambato La Gran Ciudad

Final
- Champion: (Argentina) Thiago Agustín Tirante
- Runner-up: (Peru) Juan Pablo Varillas
- Score: 7–5, 7–5

Events
| Singles | Doubles |
- Ambato La Gran Ciudad

This was the first edition of the tournament.

Thiago Agustín Tirante won the title after defeating Juan Pablo Varillas 7–5, 7–5 in the final.

== Seeds ==
1. (Peru) Juan Pablo Varillas (final)
2. (Slovakia) Andrej Martin (second round)
3. (Bolivia) Hugo Dellien (withdrew)
4. (Ecuador) Emilio Gómez (first round)
5. (Argentina) Renzo Olivo (first round)
6. (Argentina) Juan Pablo Ficovich (semifinals)
7. (Argentina) Thiago Agustín Tirante (champion)
8. (Bosnia and Herzegovina) Mirza Bašić (first round)

== Draw ==
Key

- Q = Qualifier
- WC = Wild card
- LL = Lucky loser
- Alt = Alternate
- ITF = ITF entry
- PR = Protected ranking
- SR = Special ranking
- SE = Special exempt
- JE = Junior exempt
- JR = Junior Accelerator Programme entrant
- CO = College Accelerator Programme entrant
- NG = Next Gen Accelerator Program entrant
- w/o = Walkover
- r = Retired
- d = Defaulted

=== Finals ===
Semifinals
1 | (Peru) Juan Pablo Varillas | 6 | 6
6 | (Argentina) Juan Pablo Ficovich | 3 | 4
7 | (Argentina) Thiago Agustín Tirante | 7 | 5 | 6
(Argentina) Facundo Mena | 5 | 7 | 3

Final
1 | (Peru) Juan Pablo Varillas | 5 | 5
7 | (Argentina) Thiago Agustín Tirante | 7 | 7

=== Top half ===
First round
1 | (Peru) JP Varillas | 6 | 3 | 7^{8}
(Ecuador) R Quiroz | 3 | 6 | 6^{6}
(Dominican Republic) N Hardt | 2 | 6^{6}
(Argentina) GA Olivieri | 6 | 7^{8}
(Spain) A Menéndez Maceiras | 2 | 5
(Bosnia and Herzegovina) N Fatić | 6 | 7
Q | (Argentina) Matías Zukas | 6 | 5 | 6
5 | (Argentina) R Olivo | 4 | 7 | 4
LL | (Colombia) A González | 3 | 4
(Brazil) P Sakamoto | 6 | 6
Q | (Spain) P Martín Tiffon | 5 | 6^{7}
(Switzerland) J Nikles | 7 | 7^{9}
Q | (Colombia) A Gómez | 6 | 6
WC | (Ecuador) AC March | 3 | 4
WC | (Ecuador) Daniel Espín Pérez | 1 | 0
6 | (Argentina) JP Ficovich | 6 | 6

Second round
1 | (Peru) JP Varillas | 6 | 6
(Argentina) GA Olivieri | 1 | 3
(Bosnia and Herzegovina) N Fatić | 4 | 1^{r}
Q | (Argentina) M Zukas | 6 | 2
(Brazil) P Sakamoto | 3 | 4
(Switzerland) J Nikles | 6 | 6
Q | (Colombia) A Gómez | 2 | 6^{11}
6 | (Argentina) JP Ficovich | 6 | 7^{13}

Quarterfinals
1 | (Peru) JP Varillas | 6 | 6
Q | (Argentina) M Zukas | 2 | 4
(Switzerland) J Nikles | 6 | 6^{2} | 5
6 | (Argentina) JP Ficovich | 0 | 7^{7} | 7

Semifinals
1 | (Peru) JP Varillas | 6 | 6
6 | (Argentina) JP Ficovich | 3 | 4

=== Bottom half ===
First round
7 | (Argentina) TA Tirante | 7^{7} | 4 | 7^{7}
(Colombia) C Rodríguez | 6^{4} | 6 | 6^{5}
(Spain) C Gómez-Herrera | 6 | 6^{6} | 6
(Spain) Eduard Esteve Lobato | 4 | 7^{8} | 3
PR | (Austria) G Melzer | 6^{7} | 6 | 6
Q | (United States) P Kypson | 7^{9} | 1 | 4
(Germany) J Lenz | 6 | 7^{8}
4 | (Ecuador) E Gómez | 4 | 6^{6}
8 | (Bosnia and Herzegovina) M Bašić | 6^{7} | 4
(Monaco) L Catarina | 7^{9} | 6
WC | (Ecuador) D Hidalgo | 4 | 3
(Argentina) F Mena | 6 | 6
LL | (France) Alexis Gautier | 6 | 6^{7} | 6
SE | (Chile) G Lama | 4 | 7^{9} | 3
(Spain) O Roca Batalla | 4 | 6 | 6^{7}
2 | (Slovakia) A Martin | 6 | 3 | 7^{9}

Second round
7 | (Argentina) TA Tirante | 7^{7} | 3 | 7^{7}
(Spain) C Gómez-Herrera | 6^{5} | 6 | 6^{1}
PR | (Austria) G Melzer | 6 | 7
(Germany) J Lenz | 3 | 5
(Monaco) L Catarina | 6 | 6^{3} | 4
(Argentina) F Mena | 4 | 7^{7} | 6
LL | (France) A Gautier | 6 | 7^{7}
2 | (Slovakia) A Martin | 3 | 6^{1}

Quarterfinals
7 | (Argentina) TA Tirante | 6 | 6
PR | (Austria) G Melzer | 3 | 4
(Argentina) F Mena | 7^{9} | 6
LL | (France) A Gautier | 6^{7} | 4

Semifinals
7 | (Argentina) TA Tirante | 7 | 5 | 6
(Argentina) F Mena | 5 | 7 | 3
