= 2021 Ambato La Gran Ciudad – Doubles =

Doubles
- 2021 Ambato La Gran Ciudad

Final
- Champions: (Ecuador) Diego Hidalgo (Colombia) Cristian Rodríguez
- Runners-up: (Colombia) Alejandro Gómez (Argentina) Thiago Agustín Tirante
- Score: 6–3, 4–6, [10–3]

Events
Singles	Doubles
- Ambato La Gran Ciudad

This was the first edition of the tournament.

Diego Hidalgo and Cristian Rodríguez won the title after defeating Alejandro Gómez and Thiago Agustín Tirante 6–3, 4–6, [10–3] in the final.

== Seeds ==
1. (Peru) Sergio Galdós / (Argentina) Facundo Mena (first round)
2. (Spain) Carlos Gómez-Herrera / (Argentina) Renzo Olivo (quarterfinals)
3. (Ecuador) Diego Hidalgo / (Colombia) Cristian Rodríguez (champions)
4. (Slovakia) Andrej Martin / (Portugal) Gonçalo Oliveira (semifinals, withdrew)

== Draw ==
Key

- Q = Qualifier
- WC = Wild card
- LL = Lucky loser
- Alt = Alternate
- ITF = ITF entry
- PR = Protected ranking
- SR = Special ranking
- SE = Special exempt
- JE = Junior exempt
- JR = Junior Accelerator Programme entrant
- CO = College Accelerator Programme entrant
- NG = Next Gen Accelerator Program entrant
- w/o = Walkover
- r = Retired
- d = Defaulted

First round
1	(Peru) S Galdós (Argentina) F Mena	2	6	[8]
(Colombia) A Gómez (Argentina) TA Tirante	6	2	[10]
(Ecuador) E Gómez (Ecuador) R Quiroz	6	6^{4}	[7]
(Bolivia) B Arias (Bolivia) F Zeballos	4	7^{7}	[10]
4	(Slovakia) A Martin (Portugal) G Oliveira	6	7^{7}
WC	(Ecuador) Á Guillén Meza (Argentina) G Villanueva	2	6^{5}
(Switzerland) L Castelnuovo (Switzerland) J Nikles	3	2
(Spain) Eduard Esteve Lobato (Spain) O Roca Batalla	6	6
(Peru) A Merino (United States) JA Ore	5	5
(Bolivia) A Mendoza (Argentina) Matías Zukas	7	7
WC	(Ecuador) Juan Pinto Vela (Ecuador) Sebastián Sevilla Sevilla	0	0
3	(Ecuador) D Hidalgo (Colombia) C Rodríguez	6	6
PR	(Germany) J Lenz (Austria) G Melzer	6	6
WC	(Ecuador) AC March (Spain) P Martín Tiffon	3	3
(Colombia) A González (Spain) A Menéndez Maceiras	1	6^{1}
2	(Spain) C Gómez-Herrera (Argentina) R Olivo	6	7^{7}

Quarterfinals
(Colombia) A Gómez (Argentina) TA Tirante	6	6
(Bolivia) B Arias (Bolivia) F Zeballos	3	3
4	(Slovakia) A Martin (Portugal) G Oliveira	6	6
(Spain) E Esteve Lobato (Spain) O Roca Batalla	4	2
(Bolivia) A Mendoza (Argentina) M Zukas	7^{12}	3	[4]
3	(Ecuador) D Hidalgo (Colombia) C Rodríguez	6^{10}	6	[10]
PR	(Germany) J Lenz (Austria) G Melzer	7^{7}	4	[13]
2	(Spain) C Gómez-Herrera (Argentina) R Olivo	6^{4}	6	[11]

Semifinals
(Colombia) A Gómez (Argentina) TA Tirante	w/o
4	(Slovakia) A Martin (Portugal) G Oliveira
3	(Ecuador) D Hidalgo (Colombia) C Rodríguez	7^{7}	6
PR	(Germany) J Lenz (Austria) G Melzer	6^{2}	4

Final
(Colombia) A Gómez (Argentina) TA Tirante	3	6	[3]
3	(Ecuador) D Hidalgo (Colombia) C Rodríguez	6	4	[10]
