= Benjamin Lock =

Zimbabwean tennis player (born 1993)

- Full name: Benjamin Lentaigne Lock
- Country (sports): Zimbabwe
- Residence: Tallahassee, Florida, United States
- Born: March 4, 1993 (age 33) Harare, Zimbabwe
- Height: 1.98 m (6 ft 6 in)
- Turned pro: 2016
- Plays: Right-handed (two-handed backhand)
- College: Florida State University
- Coach: Freeman Nyamunokora, Albert Portas
- Prize money: US $297,793

Singles
- Career record: 12–7
- Career titles: 0
- Highest ranking: No. 309 (6 January 2025)
- Current ranking: No. 1,075 (19 October 2026)

Doubles
- Career record: 3–8
- Career titles: 0
- Highest ranking: No. 154 (14 October 2024)
- Current ranking: No. 709 (19 October 2026)

Team competitions
- Davis Cup: 35–12
- Last updated on: 19 October 2026.

Benjamin Lock (born 4 March 1993) is a Zimbabwean tennis player. He has a career high ATP singles ranking of world No. 309 achieved on 6 January 2025 and a career high ATP doubles ranking of No. 154 achieved on 14 October 2024.

He is part of the Zimbabwe Davis Cup team, alongside his brother Courtney John Lock, where he has a win–loss record of 35–12.

Lock has won 12 ITF singles titles and 6 ATP Challengers and 35 ITF doubles titles.

== Career ==
In November 2014, Lock won his first doubles title on the ITF Men's Circuit, playing alongside Jean-Yves Aubone in Niceville, Florida. In June 2015, Lock won his first singles title on the ITF Men's Circuit in Mozambique.

In February 2020, Lock won his first Challenger doubles title in Launceston, Australia playing alongside Evan King.

In June 2023, Lock reached his first Challenger singles final at the Medellín Open, losing to Patrick Kypson. In September 2023, Lock made his ATP Tour debut as a qualifier at the 2023 Chengdu Open, losing to seventh seed Miomir Kecmanović in the first round.

In June 2024, the Lock brothers won their first Challenger title together in Blois, France making it the first team from Zimbabwe to win an ATP Challenger or tour-level event since Wayne Black and Kevin Ullyett at the 2005 Australian Open.

== Personal life ==
Lock was born on March 4, 1993, in Harare. He currently resides in Tallahassee, Florida Lock has a younger brother, Courtney John Lock, who is also a professional tennis player. His brother currently resides in Las Vegas, Nevada. Both brothers speak English and Shona, with English being their native language.

Lock is currently in a relationship with the Brazilian tennis player Laura Pigossi.

== ATP Challenger and ITF Futures/World Tennis Tour finals ==
=== Singles: 24 (13–11) ===
Legend ATP Challenger Tour (0–1) ITF Futures/World Tennis Tour (13–10)	Finals by surface Hard (8–7) Clay (5–3) Grass (0–1) Carpet (0–0)

Result	W–L	Date	Tournament	Tier	Surface	Opponent	Score
Win	1–0	Jun 2015	Mozambique F1, Maputo	Futures	Hard	(United States) William Bushamuka	6–4, 6–4
Win	2–0	Jun 2016	Zimbabwe F1, Harare	Futures	Hard	(Australia) Marc Polmans	5–7, 7–6^{(7–5)}, 7–5
Loss	2–1	Jul 2016	Egypt F16, Sharm El Sheikh	Futures	Hard	(United States) Adam El Mihdawy	2–6, 4–6
Loss	2–2	Nov 2016	El Salvador F1, San Salvador	Futures	Hard	(El Salvador) Marcelo Arévalo	2–6, 3–6
Loss	2–3	Feb 2017	Turkey F6, Antalya	Futures	Hard	(Germany) Marc Sieber	3–6, 6–7^{(5–7)}
Win	3–3	Jun 2017	Zimbabwe F2, Harare	Futures	Hard	(France) Baptiste Crepatte	6–3, 6–1
Win	4–3	Jun 2018	Zimbabwe F1, Harare	Futures	Hard	(Zimbabwe) Takanyi Garanganga	7–6^{(9–7)}, 6–2
Loss	4–4	Jun 2018	Zimbabwe F3, Harare	Futures	Hard	(Zimbabwe) Takanyi Garanganga	1–6, 4–6
Loss	4–5	Nov 2018	Mozambique F1, Maputo	Futures	Hard	(Argentina) Matías Franco Descotte	6–7^{(6–8)}, 2–6
Loss	4–6	Nov 2018	Mozambique F2, Maputo	Futures	Hard	(Argentina) Matías Franco Descotte	2–6, 3–6
Win	5–6	Dec 2018	South Africa F3, Stellenbosch	Futures	Hard	(South Africa) Ruan Roelofse	6–7^{(3–7)}, 6–3, 6–2
Loss	5–7	May 2019	M15 Accra, Ghana	World Tennis Tour	Hard	(United Kingdom) Ryan James Storrie	4–6, 4–6
Win	6–7	Jun 2019	M15 Harare, Zimbabwe	World Tennis Tour	Hard	(Zimbabwe) Takanyi Garanganga	6–4, 6–0
Loss	6–8	Sep 2019	M15 Tabarka, Tunisia	World Tennis Tour	Clay	(Argentina) Tomás Martín Etcheverry	4–6, 1–6
Win	7–8	Sep 2019	M15 Johannesburg, South Africa	World Tennis Tour	Hard	(Bulgaria) Alexander Donski	6–7^{(5–7)}, 6–3, 7–6^{(7–3)}
Loss	7–9	Jun 2021	M15 Gaiba, Italy	World Tennis Tour	Grass	(Germany) Mats Rosenkranz	6–7^{(11–13)}, 6–7^{(5–7)}
Win	8–9	Mar 2022	M25 Medellín, Colombia	World Tennis Tour	Clay	(United States) Oliver Crawford	7–6^{(7–3)}, 4–6, 7–6^{(7–5)}
Win	9–9	May 2023	M15 Addis Ababa, Ethiopia	World Tennis Tour	Clay	(Ukraine) Eric Vanshelboim	7–5, 6–2
Win	10–9	May 2023	M15 Addis Ababa, Ethiopia	World Tennis Tour	Clay	(India) Rishab Agarwal	6–2, 6–2
Loss	10-10	Jun 2023	Medellín, Colombia	Challenger	Clay	(United States) Patrick Kypson	3–6, 3–6
Win	11–10	May 2024	M15 Addis Ababa, Ethiopia	World Tennis Tour	Clay	(Italy) Luca Fantini	7–6^{(7–2)}, 6–4
Win	12–10	Aug 2024	M25 Arequipa, Peru	World Tennis Tour	Clay	(Chile) Matías Soto	6–1, 6–3
Win	13–10	Nov 2024	M15 Huamantla, Mexico	World Tennis Tour	Hard	(Turkey) Arda Azkara	6–4, 6–4
Loss	13–11	Oct 2026	M25 Kigali, Ruanda	World Tennis Tour	Clay	(France) Calvin Hemery	3–6, 3–6

=== Doubles: 74 (40–34) ===
Legend ATP Challenger Tour (6–8) ITF Futures/World Tennis Tour (34–26)	Finals by surface Hard (32–27) Clay (8–7) Grass (0–0) Carpet (0–0)

Result	W–L	Date	Tournament	Tier	Surface	Partner	Opponents	Score
Win	1–0	Nov 2014	USA F31, Niceville	Futures	Clay	(United States) Jean-Yves Aubone	(Cuba) Randy Blanco (China) Tao Jun Nan	6–1, 6–2
Loss	1–1	Jul 2015	Zimbabwe F3, Harare	Futures	Hard	(Zimbabwe) Courtney John Lock	(United States) Evan King (United States) Anderson Reed	6–4, 4–6, [7–10]
Loss	1–2	Sep 2015	USA F27, Costa Mesa	Futures	Hard	(United States) Jean-Yves Aubone	(United States) Mackenzie McDonald (United States) Martin Redlicki	2–6, 6–3, [5–10]
Win	2–2	Jun 2016	Mozambique F2, Maputo	Futures	Hard	(Zimbabwe) Courtney John Lock	(United States) John Lamble (Portugal) Bernardo Saraiva	6–4, 6–3
Loss	2–3	Jun 2016	Zimbabwe F1, Harare	Futures	Hard	(Zimbabwe) Courtney John Lock	(France) Hugo Nys (Italy) Andrea Vavassori	3–6, 3–6
Loss	2–4	Jul 2016	Zimbabwe F3, Harare	Futures	Hard	(Zimbabwe) Courtney John Lock	(France) Hugo Nys (India) Vishnu Vardhan	7–6^{(7–5)}, 4–6, [5–10]
Win	3–4	Jul 2016	Egypt F16, Sharm El Sheikh	Futures	Hard	(Zimbabwe) Courtney John Lock	(United States) Jarmere Jenkins (United States) Anderson Reed	3–6, 6–3, [10–8]
Loss	3–5	Sep 2016	Egypt F23, Sharm El Sheikh	Futures	Hard	(United States) Alex Lawson	(Brazil) Pedro Bernardi (Argentina) Mateo Nicolás Martínez	6–7^{(4–7)}, 3–6
Loss	3–6	Nov 2016	El Salvador F1, San Salvador	Futures	Hard	(United States) Evan Song	(Dominican Republic) José Olivares (Brazil) Caio Silva	6–7^{(6–8)}, 3–6
Loss	3–7	Mar 2017	Turkey F8, Antalya	Futures	Hard	(South Korea) Hong Seong-chan	(Brazil) Pedro Bernardi (Guatemala) Christopher Díaz Figueroa	6–2, 2–6, [10–12]
Win	4–7	Mar 2017	Egypt F8, Sharm El Sheikh	Futures	Hard	(Philippines) Francis Alcantara	(Chinese Taipei) Chen Ti (China) Sun Fajing	6–3, 6–7^{(7–9)}, [10–7]
Loss	4–8	Mar 2017	Bahrain F1, Manama	Futures	Hard	(Philippines) Francis Alcantara	(Sweden) Markus Eriksson (Sweden) Milos Sekulic	3–6, 1–6
Loss	4–9	May 2017	Spain F15, Santa Margarida de Montbui	Futures	Hard	(Italy) Erik Crepaldi	(Portugal) Nuno Deus (Portugal) João Monteiro	3–6, 6–3, [7–10]
Win	5–9	Jun 2017	Zimbabwe F1, Harare	Futures	Hard	(United States) Nathaniel Lammons	(Zimbabwe) Mark Fynn (South Africa) Nicolaas Scholtz	6–2, 6–3
Loss	5–10	Jun 2017	Zimbabwe F2, Harare	Futures	Hard	(United States) Nathaniel Lammons	(Zimbabwe) Mark Fynn (South Africa) Nicolaas Scholtz	6–3, 1–6, [7–10]
Win	6–10	Jul 2017	Zimbabwe F3, Harare	Futures	Hard	(United States) Nathaniel Lammons	(France) Baptiste Crepatte (France) Thomas Setodji	7–6^{(7–4)}, 6–2
Loss	6–11	Jul 2017	Egypt F19, Sharm El Sheikh	Futures	Hard	(United States) Nathaniel Lammons	(Ukraine) Marat Deviatiarov (Czech Republic) Tomáš Papik	4–6, 6–1, [5–10]
Loss	6–12	Sep 2017	USA F30, Claremont	Futures	Hard	(United States) Evan Song	(United States) Deiton Baughman (Brazil) Karue Sell	4–6, 5–7
Win	7–12	Nov 2017	Kuwait F1, Mishref	Futures	Hard	(United States) Robert Galloway	(India) Chandril Sood (India) Lakshit Sood	7–6^{(8–6)}, 7–5
Win	8–12	Nov 2017	Kuwait F2, Mishref	Futures	Hard	(United States) Robert Galloway	(France) Baptiste Crepatte (France) Lény Mitjana	6–3, 6–2
Win	9–12	Nov 2017	Kuwait F3, Mishref	Futures	Hard	(United States) Robert Galloway	(Netherlands) Marc Dijkhuizen (Serbia) Darko Jandrić	6–2, 6–1
Win	10–12	Nov 2017	South Africa F1, Stellenbosch	Futures	Hard	(United States) Robert Galloway	(Germany) Peter Heller (Germany) George von Massow	5–7, 6–2, [10–5]
Win	11–12	Dec 2017	South Africa F2, Stellenbosch	Futures	Hard	(United States) Robert Galloway	(Netherlands) Michiel de Krom (Netherlands) Ryan Nijboer	6–3, 6–3
Win	12–12	Dec 2017	South Africa F3, Stellenbosch	Futures	Hard	(United States) Robert Galloway	(Spain) Jaime Pulgar-García (Spain) Javier Pulgar-García	7–6^{(7–3)}, 6–7^{(4–7)}, [10–5]
Loss	12–13	Jan 2018	Turkey F3, Antalya	Futures	Hard	(Slovenia) Nik Razboršek	(Russia) Timur Kiyamov (Russia) Alexander Pavlioutchenkov	2–6, 1–6
Loss	12–14	Mar 2018	Egypt F8, Sharm El Sheikh	Futures	Hard	(United States) Robert Galloway	(Guatemala) Christopher Díaz Figueroa (Guatemala) Wilfredo González	4–6, 6–4, [10–12]
Win	13–14	Mar 2018	Egypt F9, Sharm El Sheikh	Futures	Hard	(Guatemala) Wilfredo González	(Austria) Alexander Erler (Czech Republic) Jaroslav Pospíšil	6–3, 6–4
Loss	13–15	May 2018	Puerto Vallarta, Mexico	Challenger	Hard	(Brazil) Fernando Romboli	(Croatia) Ante Pavić (Serbia) Danilo Petrović	7–6^{(7–2)}, 4–6, [5–10]
Win	14–15	Jun 2018	Zimbabwe F1, Harare	Futures	Hard	(Zimbabwe) Courtney John Lock	(India) Anirudh Chandrasekar (India) Vignesh Peranamallur	6–3, 6–0
Win	15–15	Jun 2018	Zimbabwe F2, Harare	Futures	Hard	(Zimbabwe) Courtney John Lock	(United States) Connor Farren (Germany) Milen Ianakiev	6–2, 6–3
Win	16–15	Jun 2018	Zimbabwe F3, Harare	Futures	Hard	(Zimbabwe) Courtney John Lock	(United States) Jordan Parker (United Kingdom) Isaac Stoute	Walkover
Loss	16–16	Jul 2018	France F13, Ajaccio	Futures	Hard	(Ukraine) Marat Deviatiarov	(France) Mick Lescure (Belgium) Yannick Mertens	5–7, 6–7^{(6–8)}
Loss	16–17	Aug 2018	Gwangju, South Korea	Challenger	Hard	(New Zealand) Rubin Statham	(South Korea) Nam Ji-sung (South Korea) Song Min-kyu	7–5, 3–6, [5–10]
Win	17–17	Oct 2018	Nigeria F5, Lagos	Futures	Hard	(Zimbabwe) Courtney John Lock	(France) Tom Jomby (Benin) Alexis Klégou	3–6, 6–4, [10–7]
Win	18–17	Nov 2018	Mozambique F1, Maputo	Futures	Hard	(Zimbabwe) Courtney John Lock	(United States) Luke Jacob Gamble (United States) Tyler Lu	5–7, 6–3, [10–4]
Loss	18–18	Nov 2018	Mozambique F2, Maputo	Futures	Hard	(Zimbabwe) Courtney John Lock	(United States) Luke Jacob Gamble (United States) Tyler Lu	7–5, 3–6, [6–10]
Loss	18–19	Dec 2018	South Africa F2, Stellenbosch	Futures	Hard	(Zimbabwe) Courtney John Lock	(Hungary) Gábor Borsos (Hungary) Péter Nagy	6–7^{(1–7)}, 2–6
Loss	18–20	Feb 2019	M15 Sharm El Sheikh, Egypt	World Tennis Tour	Hard	(Zimbabwe) Courtney John Lock	(Italy) Enrico Dalla Valle (Italy) Francesco Forti	6–7^{(5–7)}, 7–6^{(7–5)}, [7–10]
Loss	18–21	Feb 2019	M15 Sharm El Sheikh, Egypt	World Tennis Tour	Hard	(Zimbabwe) Courtney John Lock	(Belgium) Michael Geerts (Ukraine) Vladyslav Manafov	3–6, 6–7^{(10–12)}
Win	19–21	Feb 2019	M15 Sharm El Sheikh, Egypt	World Tennis Tour	Hard	(Zimbabwe) Courtney John Lock	(Netherlands) Ryan Nijboer (Spain) Pablo Vivero González	7–6^{(7–4)}, 6–7^{(5–7)}, [11–9]
Loss	19–22	Apr 2019	M25+H Abuja, Nigeria	World Tennis Tour	Hard	(Zimbabwe) Courtney John Lock	(France) Sadio Doumbia (France) Fabien Reboul	7–6^{(7–5)}, 3–6, [7–10]
Win	20–22	May 2019	M15 Accra, Ghana	World Tennis Tour	Hard	(Zimbabwe) Courtney John Lock	(United Kingdom) David Anthony Hale (Sweden) Niklas Johansson	6–4, 6–1
Win	21–22	Jun 2019	M15 Harare, Zimbabwe	World Tennis Tour	Hard	(Zimbabwe) Courtney John Lock	(Canada) Martin Beran (United Kingdom) Joshua Paris	6–3, 6–0
Win	22–22	Sep 2019	M15 Johannesburg, South Africa	World Tennis Tour	Hard	(Zimbabwe) Courtney John Lock	(Bulgaria) Alexander Donski (Austria) David Pichler	6–3, 6–4
Loss	22–23	Oct 2019	M25+H Lagos, Nigeria	World Tennis Tour	Hard	(Zimbabwe) Courtney John Lock	(Tunisia) Aziz Dougaz (Tunisia) Skander Mansouri	6–7^{(4–7)}, 3–6
Win	23–23	Oct 2019	M25+H Lagos, Nigeria	World Tennis Tour	Hard	(Zimbabwe) Courtney John Lock	(United States) William Bushamuka (India) Aryan Goveas	6–4, 6–4
Win	24–23	Nov 2019	M15 Maputo, Mozambique	World Tennis Tour	Hard	(Zimbabwe) Courtney John Lock	(Australia) Jake Delaney (Mozambique) Bruno Nhavene	6–4, 6–3
Loss	24–24	Nov 2019	M15 Monastir, Tunisia	World Tennis Tour	Hard	(Tunisia) Aziz Dougaz	(Belgium) Zizou Bergs (Italy) Francesco Vilardo	3–6, 4–6
Win	25–24	Dec 2019	M15 Monastir, Tunisia	World Tennis Tour	Hard	(Tunisia) Aziz Dougaz	(Czech Republic) Ondřej Krstev (Czech Republic) Jan Šátral	6–7^{(6–8)}, 6–2, [10–8]
Win	26–24	Feb 2020	Launceston, Australia	Challenger	Hard	(United States) Evan King	(Belgium) Kimmer Coppejans (Spain) Sergio Martos Gornés	3–6, 6–3, [10–8]
Win	27–24	Apr 2021	M15 Monastir, Tunisia	World Tennis Tour	Hard	(Tunisia) Aziz Dougaz	(Italy) Franco Agamenone (Poland) Piotr Matuszewski	7–6^{(7–2)}, 3–6, [11–9]
Loss	27–25	May 2021	M15 Monastir, Tunisia	World Tennis Tour	Hard	(Tunisia) Aziz Dougaz	(South Korea) Chung Yun-seong (Japan) Shintaro Imai	3–6, 2–6
Win	28–25	Jul 2021	Nur-Sultan, Kazakhstan	Challenger	Hard	(Chinese Taipei) Hsu Yu-hsiou	(Canada) Peter Polansky (Ukraine) Sergiy Stakhovsky	2–6, 6–1, [10–7]
Win	29–25	Jul 2021	Nur-Sultan, Kazakhstan	Challenger	Hard	(Chinese Taipei) Hsu Yu-hsiou	(Ukraine) Oleksii Krutykh (Kazakhstan) Grigoriy Lomakin	6–3, 6–4
Win	30–25	Oct 2021	M25 Pretoria, South Africa	World Tennis Tour	Hard	(Australia) Jeremy Beale	(Netherlands) Ryan Nijboer (Austria) Neil Oberleitner	4–6, 6–4, [10–7]
Win	31–25	Oct 2021	M15 Kazan, Russia	World Tennis Tour	Hard	(Uzbekistan) Sanjar Fayziev	(Belarus) Aliaksandr Liaonenka (Belarus) Alexander Zgirovsky	6–2, 6–1
Loss	31–26	Jan 2022	M15 Cairo, Egypt	World Tennis Tour	Clay	(Poland) Daniel Michalski	(Chinese Taipei) Ray Ho (Kazakhstan) Grigoriy Lomakin	6–7^{(2–7)}, 6–7^{(3–7)}
Win	32–26	Mar 2022	M25 Medellín, Colombia	World Tennis Tour	Clay	(Zimbabwe) Courtney John Lock	(Australia) Akira Santillan (New Zealand) Rubin Statham	4–6, 6–4, [10–6]
Win	33–26	May 2022	M25 Santa Margherita di Pula, Italy	World Tennis Tour	Clay	(Zimbabwe) Courtney John Lock	(Australia) Adam Taylor (Australia) Jason Taylor	6–4, 3–6, [10–8]
Loss	33–27	May 2022	M15 Oran, Algeria	World Tennis Tour	Clay	(Zimbabwe) Courtney John Lock	(France) Robin Bertrand (Switzerland) Mirko Martinez	6–1, 4–6, [6–10]
Win	34–27	May 2022	M15 Oran, Algeria	World Tennis Tour	Clay	(Zimbabwe) Courtney John Lock	(France) Robin Bertrand (Switzerland) Mirko Martinez	6–1, 6–7^{(4–7)}, [10–3]
Loss	34–28	Jul 2022	Segovia, Spain	Challenger	Hard	(Zimbabwe) Courtney John Lock	(Spain) Nicolás Álvarez Varona (Spain) Iñaki Montes de la Torre	6–7^{(3–7)}, 3–6
Win	35–28	Sep 2022	Nonthaburi, Thailand	Challenger	Hard	(Japan) Yuta Shimizu	(Philippines) Francis Alcantara (Indonesia) Christopher Rungkat	6–1, 6–3
Loss	35–29	Oct 2022	Ambato, Ecuador	Challenger	Clay	(Zimbabwe) Courtney John Lock	(Argentina) Santiago Rodríguez Taverna (Argentina) Thiago Agustín Tirante	6–7^{(11–13)}, 3–6
Loss	35–30	Apr 2023	San Luis Potosí, Mexico	Challenger	Clay	(New Zealand) Rubin Statham	(Northern Mariana Islands) Colin Sinclair (Australia) Adam Walton	7–5, 3–6, [5–10]
Loss	35–31	Apr 2023	Cuernavaca, Mexico	Challenger	Hard	(New Zealand) Rubin Statham	(Tunisia) Skander Mansouri (Greece) Michail Pervolarakis	4–6, 4–6
Loss	35–32	Jul 2023	Pozoblanco, Spain	Challenger	Hard	(United Kingdom) Luke Johnson	(South Korea) Nam Ji-sung (South Korea) Song Min-kyu	6–2, 4–6, [8–10]
Win	36–32	Feb 2024	Burnie, Australia	Challenger	Hard	(Japan) Yuta Shimizu	(Australia) Blake Bayldon (Australia) Kody Pearson	6-4, 7-6^{(7-4)}
Win	37–32	Apr 2024	M25 Mosquera, Colombia	World Tennis Tour	Clay	(Zimbabwe) Courtney John Lock	(Dominican Republic) Peter Bertran (Netherlands) Thijmen Loof	7–6^{(7–3)}, 7–5
Loss	37–33	May 2024	M25 Anapoima, Colombia	World Tennis Tour	Clay	(Zimbabwe) Courtney John Lock	Ivan Denisov (Chile) Daniel Antonio Nunez	4–6, 2–6
Win	38–33	May 2024	M15 Addis Ababa, Ethiopia	World Tennis Tour	Clay	(Zimbabwe) Courtney John Lock	(India) Chirag Duhan (Germany) Maik Steiner	6–3, 7–6^{(7–4)}
Win	39–33	May 2024	M25 Addis Ababa, Ethiopia	World Tennis Tour	Clay	(Zimbabwe) Courtney John Lock	(India) S D Prajwal Dev (India) Adil Kalyanpur	3–6, 6–3, [10–8]
Win	40–33	Jun 2024	Blois, France	Challenger	Hard (i)	(Zimbabwe) Courtney John Lock	(France) Corentin Denolly (France) Arthur Géa	1–6, 6–3, [10–4]
Loss	40–34	Aug 2024	Bogotá, Colombia	Challenger	Clay	(Brazil) João Lucas Reis da Silva	(New Zealand) Finn Reynolds (Chile) Matías Soto	3–6, 4–6

== Davis Cup ==
=== Participations: (33–12) ===
Group membership World Group (0–0) WG Play-off (0–0) Group I (0–0) Group II (12–5) Group III (21–7) Group IV (0–0)	Matches by surface Hard (12–5) Clay (21–7) Grass (0–0) Carpet (0–0)	Matches by type Singles (22–7) Doubles (11–5)

- ▲ ▼ indicates the outcome of the Davis Cup match followed by the score, date, place of event, the zonal classification and its phase, and the court surface.

Rubber outcome	No.	Rubber	Match type (partner if any)	Opponent nation	Opponent player(s)	Score
▲3–0; 5 May 2010; Royal Tennis Club de Marrakech, Marrakesh, Morocco; Europe/Africa Zone Group III round robin; Clay surface
Victory	1	I	Singles	Botswana	Lefa Ashley Sibanda	6–0, 6–0
▲3–0; 7 May 2010; Royal Tennis Club de Marrakech, Marrakesh, Morocco; Europe/Africa Zone Group III round robin; Clay surface
Victory	2	I	Singles	(Republic of the Congo) Congo	Evence Kamessa	6–1, 6–0
▲2–0; 8 May 2010; Royal Tennis Club de Marrakech, Marrakesh, Morocco; Europe/Africa Zone Group III 7th-8th Playoff; Clay surface
Victory	3	I	Singles	Ivory Coast	Lavry Sylvain N'yaba	6–2, 6–3
▲3–0; 6 July 2011; Smash Tennis Academy, Cairo, Egypt; Europe/Africa Zone Group III round robin; Clay surface
Victory	4	I	Singles	Kenya	Gilbert Kibet	6–1, 6–1
Victory	5	III	Doubles (with Mark Fynn) (dead rubber)	Kenya	Dennis Ochieng / Ismael Changawa Ruwa Mzai	6–0, 6–1
▲3–0; 7 July 2011; Smash Tennis Academy, Cairo, Egypt; Europe/Africa Zone Group III round robin; Clay surface
Victory	6	III	Doubles (with Mark Fynn) (dead rubber)	Ghana	Robert Kpodo / Emmanuel Mensah	6–2, 7–5
▼1–2; 8 July 2011; Smash Tennis Academy, Cairo, Egypt; Europe/Africa Zone Group III round robin; Clay surface
Victory	7	III	Doubles (with Mark Fynn) (dead rubber)	Algeria	Mohamed Amine Kerroum / Mohamed-Redha Ouahab	6–2, 6–3
▼0–2; 8 July 2011; Smash Tennis Academy, Cairo, Egypt; Europe/Africa Zone Group III 1st-4th Playoff; Clay surface
Defeat	8	I	Singles	Egypt	Sherif Sabry	0–6, 3–6
▼0–3; 2 July 2012; Cite Nationale Sportive d'El, Tunis, Tunisia; Europe/Africa Zone Group III round robin; Clay surface
Defeat	9	I	Singles	Tunisia	Mohamed Haythem Abid	3–6, 3–6
Defeat	10	III	Doubles (with Tendai Tapfuma) (dead rubber)	Tunisia	Anis Ghorbel / Slim Hamza	3–6, 2–6
▲2–1; 3 July 2012; Cite Nationale Sportive d'El, Tunis, Tunisia; Europe/Africa Zone Group III round robin; Clay surface
Victory	11	I	Singles	Ghana	Raymond Hayford	6–1, 6–1
Victory	12	III	Doubles (with Tendai Tapfuma)	Ghana	Henry Adjei-Darko / Raymond Hayford	6–3, 6–3
▲3–0; 4 July 2012; Cite Nationale Sportive d'El, Tunis, Tunisia; Europe/Africa Zone Group III round robin; Clay surface
Victory	13	I	Singles	Namibia	Tukhula Jacobs	6–4, 6–2
Victory	14	III	Doubles (with Tendai Tapfuma) (dead rubber)	Namibia	Johan de Witt / Gideon Van Dyk	6–3, 6–1
▼1–2; 6 July 2012; Cite Nationale Sportive d'El, Tunis, Tunisia; Europe/Africa Zone Group III 1st-4th Playoff; Clay surface
Victory	15	I	Singles	Benin	Loic Didavi	6–3, 7–6^{(7–5)}
Defeat	16	III	Doubles (with Tendai Tapfuma)	Benin	Loic Didavi / Alexis Klégou	3–6, 1–6
▲3–0; 8 September 2014; Smash Tennis Academy, Cairo, Egypt; Europe/Africa Zone Group III round robin; Clay surface
Victory	17	II	Singles	(Republic of the Congo) Congo	Armel Mokobo	6–1, 6–0
▲3–0; 10 September 2014; Smash Tennis Academy, Cairo, Egypt; Europe/Africa Zone Group III round robin; Clay surface
Victory	18	I	Singles	Nigeria	Sylvester Emmanuel	6–3, 6–3
Victory	19	III	Doubles (with Mark Fynn) (dead rubber)	Nigeria	Henry Atseye / Clifford Enosoregbe	6–4, 6–2
▲2–1; 11 September 2014; Smash Tennis Academy, Cairo, Egypt; Europe/Africa Zone Group III round robin; Clay surface
Defeat	20	I	Singles	Madagascar	Lofo Ramiaramanana	4–6, 6–4, 6–7^{(6–8)}
▲2–0; 13 September 2014; Smash Tennis Academy, Cairo, Egypt; Europe/Africa Zone Group III 1st-4th Playoff; Clay surface
Victory	21	I	Singles	Namibia	Jacobus Serdyn	6–0, 6–1
▼1–4; 6-8 March 2015; Harare Sports Club, Harare, Zimbabwe; Europe/Africa Zone Group II First round; Hard surface
Defeat	22	II	Singles	Bosnia and Herzegovina	Damir Džumhur	3–6, 6–7^{(1–7)}, 3–6
Victory	23	V	Singles (dead rubber)	Bosnia and Herzegovina	Nerman Fatić	6–3, RET
▲5–0; 17-19 July 2015; Harare Sports Club, Harare, Zimbabwe; Europe/Africa Zone Group II Relegation play off; Hard surface
Victory	24	II	Singles	Moldova	Dmitrii Baskov	6–2, 6–0, 6–2
Victory	25	V	Singles (dead rubber)	Moldova	Egor Matvievici	6–1, 6–0
▼2–3; 15-17 July 2016; Mziuri Tennis Club, Tbilisi, Georgia; Europe/Africa Zone Group II Relegation play off; Hard surface
Victory	26	I	Singles	(Georgia (country)) Georgia	George Tsivadze	3–6, 6–0, 7–5, 6–7^{(2–7)}, 6–4
Victory	27	III	Doubles (with Courtney John Lock)	(Georgia (country)) Georgia	Nikoloz Basilashvili / Nodar Itonishvili	3–6, 3–6, 7–6^{(8–6)}, 6–4, 6–4
Defeat	28	IV	Singles	(Georgia (country)) Georgia	Nikoloz Basilashvili	3–6, 4–6, 2–6
▲3–0; 17 July 2017; Solaimaneyah Club, Cairo, Egypt; Europe/Africa Zone Group III round robin; Clay surface
Victory	29	II	Singles	Rwanda	Olivier Havugimana	6–1, 6–1
Victory	30	III	Doubles (with Courtney John Lock) (dead rubber)	Rwanda	Olivier Havugimana / Fabrice Tuyishime	6–2, 6–1
▲2–1; 19 July 2017; Solaimaneyah Club, Cairo, Egypt; Europe/Africa Zone Group III round robin; Clay surface
Victory	31	I	Singles	Nigeria	Joseph Imeh Ubon	6–4, 6–2
Victory	32	III	Doubles (with Takanyi Garanganga)	Nigeria	Abdul-Mumin Babalola / Sylvester Emmanuel	7–6^{(7–4)}, 4–6, 6–3
▼0–3; 21 July 2017; Solaimaneyah Club, Cairo, Egypt; Europe/Africa Zone Group III round robin; Clay surface
Defeat	33	II	Singles	Egypt	Mohamed Safwat	2–6, 2–6
Defeat	34	III	Doubles (with Courtney John Lock) (dead rubber)	Egypt	Youssef Hossam / Sherif Sabry	4–6, 3–6
▲2–0; 22 July 2017; Solaimaneyah Club, Cairo, Egypt; Europe/Africa Zone Group III 1st-4th Playoff; Clay surface
Victory	35	I	Singles	Kenya	Sheil Kotecha	6–1, 6–1
▲3–1; 3-4 February 2018; Harare Sports Club, Harare, Zimbabwe; Europe/Africa Zone Group II First round; Hard surface
Victory	36	I	Singles	Turkey	Altuğ Çelikbilek	6–4, 1–6, 6–3
Victory	37	III	Doubles (with Takanyi Garanganga)	Turkey	Tuna Altuna / Cem İlkel	7–5, 6–3
▼1–4; 7-8 April 2018; Hala Stulecia Sopotu, Sopot, Poland; Europe/Africa Zone Group II Second round; Hard (indoor) surface
Victory	38	II	Singles	Poland	Michał Przysiężny	7–5, 7–5
Defeat	39	III	Doubles (with Takanyi Garanganga)	Poland	Łukasz Kubot / Marcin Matkowski	3–6, 3–6
Defeat	40	IV	Singles	Poland	Kamil Majchrzak	3–6, 2–6
▼1–4; 5-6 April 2019; Polyvalent Hall, Piatra Neamţ, Romania; Europe/Africa Zone Group II First round; Hard (indoor) surface
Victory	41	I	Singles	Romania	Marius Copil	6–4, 7–5
Defeat	42	III	Doubles (with Courtney John Lock)	Romania	Florin Mergea / Horia Tecău	1–6, 4–6
▲3–1; 6-7 March 2020; Harare Sports Club, Harare, Zimbabwe; World Group II Play-off First round; Hard surface
Victory	43	II	Singles	Syria	Amer Naow	6–3, 6–3
Victory	44	III	Doubles (with Courtney John Lock)	Syria	Yacoub Makzoume / Hazem Naw	6–1, 4–6, 6–3
Victory	45	IV	Singles	Syria	Hazem Naw	6–4, 6–4
