= Courtney John Lock =

Zimbabwean tennis player (born 1996)

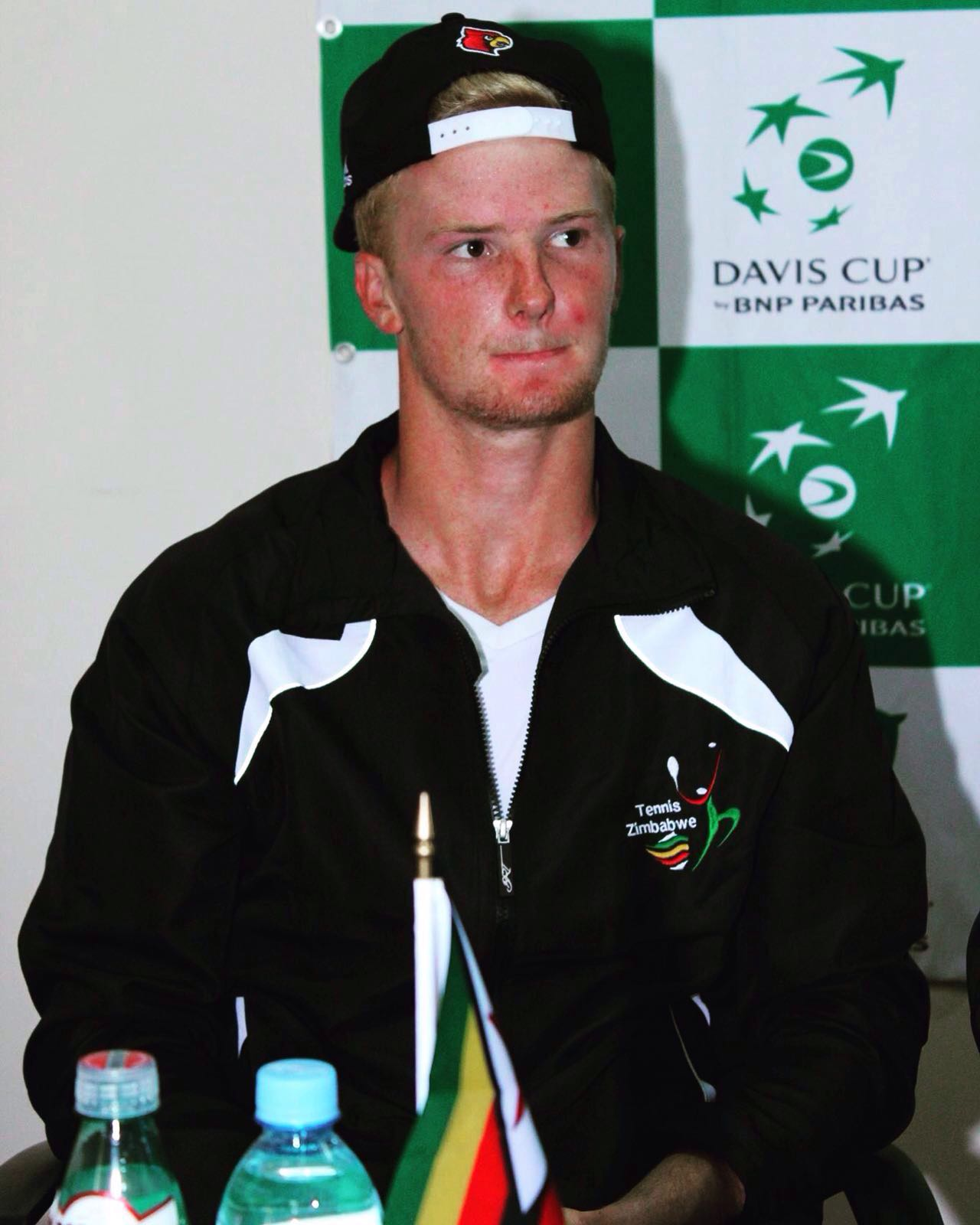
- Full name: Courtney John Ingram Lock
- Country (sports): Zimbabwe
- Residence: Las Vegas, United States
- Born: 18 October 1996 (age 30) Harare, Zimbabwe
- Height: 1.93 m (6 ft 4 in)
- Plays: Right-handed (two-handed backhand)
- College: UNLV
- Coach: Martin Lock, Freeman Nyamunokora
- Prize money: US $88,594

Singles
- Career record: 0–5 (at ATP Tour level, Grand Slam level, and in Davis Cup)
- Career titles: 0
- Highest ranking: No. 1,214 (27 February 2023)
- Current ranking: No. 1,658 (9 November 2026)

Doubles
- Career record: 3–8 (at ATP Tour level, Grand Slam level, and in Davis Cup)
- Career titles: 0
- Highest ranking: No. 173 (5 May 2025)
- Current ranking: No. 316 (9 November 2026)

Team competitions
- Davis Cup: 1–7
- Last updated on: 9 November 2026.

Courtney John Lock (born 18 October 1996) is a Zimbabwean tennis player. He has a career high ATP doubles ranking of No. 173 achieved on 5 May 2025 and a singles ranking of No. 1,214 achieved on 27 February 2023. Lock represents Zimbabwe at the Davis Cup alongside his brother Benjamin Lock. He has won 19 doubles titles on the ITF professional circuit.

== Career ==
Lock received his education at the University of Nevada, Las Vegas (USA).

He won his first Davis Cup doubles match in a 2015 Davis Cup tie against Moldova.

In June 2024, the Lock brothers won their first Challenger title together in Blois, France making it the first team from Zimbabwe to win an ATP Challenger or tour-level event since Wayne Black and Kevin Ullyett at the 2005 Australian Open.

== Personal life ==
Lock was born on 21 October 1996, in Harare. He currently resides in Las Vegas, Nevada. He has an older brother, Benjamin Lock, who is also a professional tennis player. His brother currently resides in Tallahassee, Florida. He and Benjamin can speak English and Shona, with English being their native language.

== Future and Challenger finals ==
=== Doubles: 33 (20–13) ===
Legend ATP Challengers (1–2) ITF Futures/World Tennis Tour (19–11)	Titles by surface Hard (14–10) Clay (6–3) Grass (0–0)

Result	W–L	Date	Tournament	Tier	Surface	Partner	Opponents	Score
Loss	0–1	Jul 2015	Zimbabwe F3, Harare	Futures	Hard	(Zimbabwe) Benjamin Lock	(United States) Evan King (United States) Anderson Reed	6–4, 4–6, [7–10]
Win	1–1	Jun 2016	Mozambique F2, Maputo	Futures	Hard	(Zimbabwe) Benjamin Lock	(United States) John Lamble (Portugal) Bernardo Saraiva	6–4, 6–3
Loss	1–2	Jun 2016	Zimbabwe F1, Harare	Futures	Hard	(Zimbabwe) Benjamin Lock	(France) Hugo Nys (Italy) Andrea Vavassori	3–6, 3–6
Loss	1–3	Jul 2016	Zimbabwe F3, Harare	Futures	Hard	(Zimbabwe) Benjamin Lock	(France) Hugo Nys (India) Vishnu Vardhan	7–6^{(7–5)}, 4–6, [5–10]
Win	2–3	Jul 2016	Egypt F16, Sharm El Sheikh	Futures	Hard	(Zimbabwe) Benjamin Lock	(United States) Jarmere Jenkins (United States) Anderson Reed	3–6, 6–3, [10–8]
Win	3–3	Jun 2018	Zimbabwe F1, Harare	Futures	Hard	(Zimbabwe) Benjamin Lock	(India) Anirudh Chandrasekar (India) Vignesh Peranamallur	6–3, 6–0
Win	4–3	Jun 2018	Zimbabwe F2, Harare	Futures	Hard	(Zimbabwe) Benjamin Lock	(United States) Connor Farren (Germany) Milen Ianakiev	6–2, 6–3
Win	5–3	Jun 2018	Zimbabwe F3, Harare	Futures	Hard	(Zimbabwe) Benjamin Lock	(United States) Jordan Parker (United Kingdom) Isaac Stoute	Walkover
Win	6–3	Oct 2018	Nigeria F5, Lagos	Futures	Hard	(Zimbabwe) Benjamin Lock	(France) Tom Jomby (Benin) Alexis Klégou	3–6, 6–4, [10–7]
Win	7–3	Nov 2018	Mozambique F1, Maputo	Futures	Hard	(Zimbabwe) Benjamin Lock	(United States) Luke Jacob Gamble (United States) Tyler Lu	5–7, 6–3, [10–4]
Loss	7–4	Nov 2018	Mozambique F2, Maputo	Futures	Hard	(Zimbabwe) Benjamin Lock	(United States) Luke Jacob Gamble (United States) Tyler Lu	7–5, 3–6, [6–10]
Loss	7–5	Dec 2018	South Africa F2, Stellenbosch	Futures	Hard	(Zimbabwe) Benjamin Lock	(Hungary) Gábor Borsos (Hungary) Péter Nagy	6–7^{(1–7)}, 2–6
Loss	7–6	Feb 2019	M15 Sharm El Sheikh, Egypt	World Tennis Tour	Hard	(Zimbabwe) Benjamin Lock	(Italy) Enrico Dalla Valle (Italy) Francesco Forti	6–7^{(5–7)}, 7–6^{(7–5)}, [7–10]
Loss	7–7	Feb 2019	M15 Sharm El Sheikh, Egypt	World Tennis Tour	Hard	(Zimbabwe) Benjamin Lock	(Belgium) Michael Geerts (Ukraine) Vladyslav Manafov	3–6, 6–7^{(10–12)}
Win	8–7	Feb 2019	M15 Sharm El Sheikh, Egypt	World Tennis Tour	Hard	(Zimbabwe) Benjamin Lock	(Netherlands) Ryan Nijboer (Spain) Pablo Vivero González	7–6^{(7–4)}, 6–7^{(5–7)}, [11–9]
Loss	8–8	Apr 2019	M25+H Abuja, Nigeria	World Tennis Tour	Hard	(Zimbabwe) Benjamin Lock	(France) Sadio Doumbia (France) Fabien Reboul	7–6^{(7–5)}, 3–6, [7–10]
Win	9–8	May 2019	M15 Accra, Ghana	World Tennis Tour	Hard	(Zimbabwe) Benjamin Lock	(United Kingdom) David Anthony Hale (Sweden) Niklas Johansson	6–4, 6–1
Win	10–8	Jun 2019	M15 Harare, Zimbabwe	World Tennis Tour	Hard	(Zimbabwe) Benjamin Lock	(Canada) Martin Beran (United Kingdom) Joshua Paris	6–3, 6–0
Win	11–8	Sep 2019	M15 Johannesburg, South Africa	World Tennis Tour	Hard	(Zimbabwe) Benjamin Lock	(Bulgaria) Alexander Donski (Austria) David Pichler	6–3, 6–4
Loss	11–9	Oct 2019	M25+H Lagos, Nigeria	World Tennis Tour	Hard	(Zimbabwe) Benjamin Lock	(Tunisia) Aziz Dougaz (Tunisia) Skander Mansouri	6–7^{(4–7)}, 3–6
Win	12–9	Oct 2019	M25+H Lagos, Nigeria	World Tennis Tour	Hard	(Zimbabwe) Benjamin Lock	(United States) William Bushamuka (India) Aryan Goveas	6–4, 6–4
Win	13–9	Nov 2019	M15 Maputo, Mozambique	World Tennis Tour	Hard	(Zimbabwe) Benjamin Lock	(Australia) Jake Delaney (Mozambique) Bruno Nhavene	6–4, 6–3
Win	14–9	Mar 2022	M25 Medellín, Colombia	World Tennis Tour	Clay	(Zimbabwe) Benjamin Lock	(Australia) Akira Santillan (New Zealand) Rubin Statham	4–6, 6–4, [10–6]
Win	15–9	May 2022	M25 Santa Margherita di Pula, Italy	World Tennis Tour	Clay	(Zimbabwe) Benjamin Lock	(Australia) Adam Taylor (Australia) Jason Taylor	6–4, 3–6, [10–8]
Loss	15–10	May 2022	M15 Oran, Algeria	World Tennis Tour	Clay	(Zimbabwe) Benjamin Lock	(France) Robin Bertrand (Switzerland) Mirko Martinez	6–1, 4–6, [6–10]
Win	16–10	May 2022	M15 Oran, Algeria	World Tennis Tour	Clay	(Zimbabwe) Benjamin Lock	(France) Robin Bertrand (Switzerland) Mirko Martinez	6–1, 6–7^{(4–7)}, [10–3]
Loss	16–11	Jul 2022	Segovia, Spain	Challenger	Hard	(Zimbabwe) Benjamin Lock	(Spain) Nicolás Álvarez Varona (Spain) Iñaki Montes de la Torre	6–7^{(3–7)}, 3–6
Loss	16–12	Oct 2022	Ambato, Ecuador	Challenger	Clay	(Zimbabwe) Benjamin Lock	(Argentina) Santiago Rodríguez Taverna (Argentina) Thiago Agustín Tirante	6–7^{(11–13)}, 3–6
Win	17–12	Apr 2024	M25 Mosquera, Colombia	World Tennis Tour	Clay	(Zimbabwe) Benjamin Lock	(Dominican Republic) Peter Bertran (Netherlands) Thijmen Loof	7–6^{(7–3)}, 7–5
Loss	17–13	May 2024	M25 Anapoima, Colombia	World Tennis Tour	Clay	(Zimbabwe) Benjamin Lock	Ivan Denisov (Chile) Daniel Antonio Nunez	4–6, 2–6
Win	18–13	May 2024	M15 Addis Ababa, Ethiopia	World Tennis Tour	Clay	(Zimbabwe) Benjamin Lock	(India) Chirag Duhan (Germany) Maik Steiner	6–3, 7–6^{(7–4)}
Win	19–13	May 2024	M25 Addis Ababa, Ethiopia	World Tennis Tour	Clay	(Zimbabwe) Benjamin Lock	(India) S D Prajwal Dev (India) Adil Kalyanpur	3–6, 6–3, [10–8]
Win	20–13	Jun 2024	Blois, France	Challenger	Hard (i)	(Zimbabwe) Benjamin Lock	(France) Corentin Denolly (France) Arthur Géa	1–6, 6–3, [10–4]

== Davis Cup ==
=== Participations: (4–5) ===
Group membership World Group (0–0) WG Play-off (0–0) Group I (0–0) Group II (3–4) Group III (1–1) Group IV (0–0)	Matches by surface Hard (3–4) Clay (1–1) Grass (0–0) Carpet (0–0)	Matches by type Singles (0–2) Doubles (4–3)

- ▲ ▼ indicates the outcome of the Davis Cup match followed by the score, date, place of event, the zonal classification and its phase, and the court surface.

Rubber outcome	No.	Rubber	Match type (partner if any)	Opponent nation	Opponent player(s)	Score
▲5–0; 17-19 July 2015; Harare Sports Club, Harare, Zimbabwe; Europe/Africa Zone Group II Relegation play off; Hard surface
Victory	1	III	Doubles (with Mark Fynn)	Moldova	Dmitrii Baskov / Andrei Șoltoianu	7–5, 5–7, 7–6^{(8–6)}, 6–3
▼1–4; 4-6 March 2016; Kittilän Urheiluhalli, Kittilä, Finland; Europe/Africa Zone Group II First round; Hard (indoor) surface
Defeat	2	I	Singles	Finland	Jarkko Nieminen	0–6, 0–6, 0–6
Defeat	3	III	Doubles (with Mark Fynn)	Finland	Henri Kontinen / Jarkko Nieminen	1–6, 0–6, 1–6
Defeat	4	V	Singles (dead rubber)	Finland	Harri Heliövaara	1–6, 0–6
▼2–3; 15-17 July 2016; Mziuri Tennis Club, Tbilisi, Georgia; Europe/Africa Zone Group II Relegation play off; Hard surface
Victory	5	III	Doubles (with Benjamin Lock)	(Georgia (country)) Georgia	Nikoloz Basilashvili / Nodar Itonishvili	3–6, 3–6, 7–6^{(8–6)}, 6–4, 6–4
▲3–0; 17 July 2017; Solaimaneyah Club, Cairo, Egypt; Europe/Africa Zone Group III Round Robin; Clay surface
Victory	6	III	Doubles (with Benjamin Lock) (dead rubber)	Rwanda	Olivier Havugimana / Fabrice Tuyishime	6–2, 6–1
▼0–3; 21 July 2017; Solaimaneyah Club, Cairo, Egypt; Europe/Africa Zone Group III Round Robin; Clay surface
Defeat	7	III	Doubles (with Benjamin Lock) (dead rubber)	Egypt	Youssef Hossam / Sherif Sabry	4–6, 3–6
▼1–4; 5-6 April 2019; Polyvalent Hall, Piatra Neamţ, Romania; Europe/Africa Zone Group II First round; Hard (indoor) surface
Defeat	8	III	Doubles (with Benjamin Lock)	Romania	Florin Mergea / Horia Tecău	1–6, 4–6
▲3–1; 6-7 March 2020; Harare Sports Club, Harare, Zimbabwe; World Group II Play-off First round; Hard surface
Victory	9	III	Doubles (with Benjamin Lock)	Syria	Yacoub Makzoume / Hazem Naw	6–1, 4–6, 6–3
