= 2021 Ambato La Gran Ciudad =

Clay court professional tennis tournament

- Date: 20–26 September
- Edition: 1st
- Surface: Clay
- Location: Ambato, Ecuador

Champions

Singles
- (Argentina) Thiago Agustín Tirante

Doubles
- (Ecuador) Diego Hidalgo / (Colombia) Cristian Rodríguez
- Ambato La Gran Ciudad

The 2021 Ambato La Gran Ciudad was a professional tennis tournament played on clay courts. It was the 1st edition of the tournament which was part of the 2021 ATP Challenger Tour. It took place in Ambato, Ecuador between 20 and 26 September 2021.

== Singles main-draw entrants ==
=== Seeds ===
| Country | Player | Rank^{1} | Seed |
|---|---|---|---|
| PER | Juan Pablo Varillas | 122 | 1 |
| SVK | Andrej Martin | 123 | 2 |
| ~~BOL~~ | ~~Hugo Dellien~~ | ~~144~~ | ~~3~~ |
| ECU | Emilio Gómez | 156 | 4 |
| ARG | Renzo Olivo | 207 | 5 |
| ARG | Juan Pablo Ficovich | 247 | 6 |
| ARG | Thiago Agustín Tirante | 267 | 7 |
| BIH | Mirza Bašić | 269 | 8 |

- ^{1} Rankings are as of 13 September 2021.

=== Other entrants ===
The following players received wildcards into the singles main draw:

- (Ecuador) Daniel Espín Pérez
- (Ecuador) Diego Hidalgo
- (Ecuador) Antonio Cayetano March

The following player received entry into the singles main draw using a protected ranking:

- (Austria) Gerald Melzer

The following player received entry into the singles main draw as a special exempt:

- (Chile) Gonzalo Lama

The following players received entry from the qualifying draw:

- (Colombia) Alejandro Gómez
- (United States) Patrick Kypson
- (Spain) Pol Martín Tiffon
- (Argentina) Matías Zukas

The following players received entry as lucky losers:

- (France) Alexis Gautier
- (Colombia) Alejandro González

== Champions ==
=== Singles ===
- (Argentina) Thiago Agustín Tirante def. (Peru) Juan Pablo Varillas 7–5, 7–5.

=== Doubles ===
- (Ecuador) Diego Hidalgo / (Colombia) Cristian Rodríguez def. (Colombia) Alejandro Gómez / (Argentina) Thiago Agustín Tirante 6–3, 4–6, [10–3].
