= Loic Didavi =

Beninese tennis player

- Country (sports): Benin
- Residence: Benin
- Born: 30 April 1987 (age 37)
- Prize money: $1,080

Singles
- Career record: 0–1
- Career titles: 0
- Highest ranking: No. 1413 (20 September 2004)

Doubles
- Career record: 0–0
- Career titles: 0

Loic Didavi (born 30 April 1987) is a former Beninese professional tennis player who competed on the ITF Men's Circuit. In September 2004, he achieved a career-high singles world ranking no. 1413. He played for the Benin Davis Cup team.

== See also ==
- Benin Davis Cup team
