= Haythem Abid =

Tunisian tennis player (born 1985)

Mohamed Haythem Abid
- Country (sports): Tunisia
- Residence: Los Angeles, California, U.S.
- Born: 17 July 1985 (age 41) Tunis, Tunisia
- Height: 1.88 m (6 ft 2 in)
- Plays: Left-handed (two-handed-backhand)
- Prize money: $45,060

Singles
- Career record: 1–9
- Highest ranking: No. 360 (12 April 2010)

Grand Slam singles results
- French Open Junior: 2R (2003)
- Wimbledon Junior: 2R (2003)
- US Open Junior: 1R (2002)

Doubles
- Career record: 1–3
- Highest ranking: No. 668 (7 June 2010)

Grand Slam doubles results
- French Open Junior: 1R (2003)
- Wimbledon Junior: 1R (2003)
- US Open Junior: 1R (2002)
Medal record
African Games
Silver medal – second place	2007 Algiers	Singles
Silver medal – second place	2007 Algiers	Doubles
Mediterranean Games
Silver medal – second place	2013 Mersin	Doubles

Mohamed Haythem Abid (born 17 July 1985) is a retired professional Tunisian tennis player.

Representing his country internationally, he played in thirty-seven Davis Cup ties, and won a silver medal at the 2013 Mediterranean Games partnering with Malek Jaziri.

As a junior, Abid reached as high as No. 19 in the world, and spent four years at the Bruguera Academy in Barcelona, Spain. He defeated future world No. 5 Kevin Anderson at the 2003 African Closed Junior Championship.
