= Valentin Sanon =

Ivorian tennis player

- Country (sports): Ivory Coast
- Born: 20 May 1980 (age 44)
- Turned pro: 2000
- Plays: Right-handed
- Prize money: US $72,961

Singles
- Career record: 4–15
- Career titles: 0
- Highest ranking: No. 339 (22 March 2004)

Doubles
- Career record: 1–5
- Career titles: 0
- Highest ranking: NO. 376 (20 March 2006)
- Last updated on: 20 January 2013.

Valentin Sanon (born 20 May 1980) is a former Ivorian professional tennis player, who played mainly on the ITF Futures tournaments.

The last tournament he played in was in 2011, but he has continued to play Davis Cup for the Ivory Coast, most recently in the 2012 Davis Cup's Africa zonal play.

== Career titles ==
=== Singles ===
Legend
Grand Slam (0)
Tennis Masters Cup (0)
ATP Masters Series (0)
ATP Tour (0)
Challengers (0)
Futures (3)

No.	Date	Tournament	Surface	Opponent	Score
1.	19 May 2003	Agadir	Clay	(Argentina) Brian Dabul	6–4, 6–2
2.	23 February 2004	Benin City	Hard	(Monaco) Guillaume Couillard	1–6, 7–6^{(7–4)}, 7–6^{(7–4)}
3.	15 August 2005	Lagos	Hard	(Ghana) Henry Adjei-Darko	7–6^{(7–2)}, 6–3
