= Ambato La Gran Ciudad =

Clay court professional tennis tournament

- 2022 Ambato La Gran Ciudad

Defunct tennis tournament
- Event name: Ambato La Gran Ciudad
- Location: Ambato, Ecuador
- Category: ATP Challenger Tour
- Surface: Clay
- Draw: 32S/32Q/16D

The Ambato La Gran Ciudad was a professional tennis tournament played on clay courts. It was part of the ATP Challenger Tour. It was held in Ambato, Ecuador in 2021 and 2022.

== Past finals ==
=== Singles ===
Year	Champion	Runner-up	Score
2022	(Argentina) Facundo Bagnis	(Brazil) João Lucas Reis da Silva	7–6^{(9–7)}, 6–4
2021	(Argentina) Thiago Agustín Tirante	(Peru) Juan Pablo Varillas	7–5, 7–5

=== Doubles ===
Year	Champions	Runners-up	Score
2022	(Argentina) Santiago Rodríguez Taverna (Argentina) Thiago Agustín Tirante	(Zimbabwe) Benjamin Lock (Zimbabwe) Courtney John Lock	7–6^{(13–11)}, 6–3
2021	(Ecuador) Diego Hidalgo (Colombia) Cristian Rodríguez	(Colombia) Alejandro Gómez (Argentina) Thiago Agustín Tirante	6–3, 4–6, [10–3]
