= Mark Fynn =

Zimbabwean tennis player

- Country (sports): Zimbabwe
- Residence: Harare, Zimbabwe
- Born: April 16, 1985 (age 41) Harare, Zimbabwe
- Height: 1.83 m (6 ft 0 in)
- Plays: Right-handed
- Prize money: $24,689

Singles
- Career record: 0–2
- Career titles: 0; 0 Challenger, 0 Futures
- Highest ranking: No. 890 (28 October 2013)

Doubles
- Career record: 2-8
- Career titles: 0; 0 Challenger, 2 Futures
- Highest ranking: 531 (8 September 2014)
Medal record
Representing Zimbabwe
Men's Tennis
African Games
Bronze medal – third place	2011 Maputo	Doubles
Bronze medal – third place	2015 Brazzaville	Singles
Bronze medal – third place	2015 Brazzaville	Team
- Last updated on: 22 October 2018.

Mark Fynn (born April 16, 1985) is a professional Zimbabwean tennis player.

== Career ==
Mark Fynn has primarily spent his time on the Futures circuit. He has also represented Zimbabwe in Davis Cup action.

He attended the University of Tennessee at Chattanooga from 2003 - 2006.

Played No. 1 singles for The McCallie School in Chattanooga where he compiled a 12-3 singles record as a senior. He played No. 2 doubles and posted a 13-1 doubles mark. He went 15-0 in tournament play. Coached at McCallie by Eric Voges. Held No. 1 singles ranking among Under-18 Tennessee Boys. Prior to The McCallie School he also attended St. John's College in Harare where he was a member of the cricket team.

In the 1st Round of the 2015 Davis Cup Group II Europe/Africa, he partnered with Wayne Black.

== Future and Challenger finals ==
=== Doubles 10 (2 titles, 8 runners-up) ===
Legend
Challengers 0 (0–0)
Futures 10 (2–8)	Outcome	No.	Date	Tournament	Surface	Partner	Opponents	Score
Runner-up	1.	August 4, 2013	Sharm El Sheikh, Egypt F18	Clay	(Argentina) Matias Castro	(Ukraine) Dmytro Kovalyov (Ukraine) Denys Mylokostov	5–7, 6–4, [4–10]	
Winner	2.	August 24, 2013	İzmir, Turkey F33	Hard	(Kyrgyzstan) Daniiar Duldaev	(France) Melik Feler (Peru) Alexander Merino	4–6, 6–4, [10–6]	
Runner-up	3.	September 27, 2013	Bujumbura, Burundi F1	Clay	(Burundi) Hassan Ndayishimiye	(Belgium) Yannick Mertens (India) Jeevan Nedunchezhiyan	3–6, 2–6	
Runner-up	4.	December 6, 2013	Dakar, Senegal F2	Hard	(South Africa) Damon Gooch	(Switzerland) Luca Margaroli (Czech Republic) Libor Salaba	4–6, 4–6	
Runner-up	5.	June 7, 2014	Sun City, South Africa F2	Hard	(South Africa) Damon Gooch	(South Africa) Nicolaas Scholtz (South Africa) Tucker Vorster	3–6, 4–6	
Runner-up	6.	August 24, 2014	Libreville, Gabon F1	Hard	(South Africa) Ruan Roelofse	(Republic of Ireland) Sam Barry (India) Jeevan Nedunchezhiyan	6-7, 3–6	
Runner-up	7.	August 31, 2014	Libreville, Gabon F2	Hard	(South Africa) Ruan Roelofse	(Republic of Ireland) Sam Barry (India) Jeevan Nedunchezhiyan	2–6, 2–6	
Runner-up	8.	May 21, 2017	(Niger) Abuja, Nigeria F3	Hard	(Turkey) Moez Echargui	(Brazil) Fabiano De Paula (Brazil) Fernando Romboli	6-3, 3-6, [14-16]	
Runner-up	9.	June 17, 2017	Harare, Zimbabwe F1	Hard	(South Africa) Nicolaas Scholtz	(United States) Nathaniel Lammons (Zimbabwe) Benjamin Lock	6–2, 6–3	
Winner	10.	June 24, 2017	Harare, Zimbabwe F2	Hard	(South Africa) Nicolaas Scholtz	(United States) Nathaniel Lammons (Zimbabwe) Benjamin Lock	6–3, 1–6, [7–10]	

== Davis Cup Record ==
Overall
	Total	Clay	Hard	Grass	Carpet	Unknown	Indoors	Outdoors
Won	20	20	0	0	0	0	0	20
Lost	14	13	1	0	0	0	0	14

Singles
	Total	Clay	Hard	Grass	Carpet	Unknown	Indoors	Outdoors
Won	8	8	0	0	0	0	0	8
Lost	8	8	0	0	0	0	0	8

Doubles
	Total	Clay	Hard	Grass	Carpet	Unknown	Indoors	Outdoors
Won	12	9	0	0	0	3	0	9
Lost	6	5	1	0	0	0	0	6
