= 2013 ITF Men's Circuit (April–June) =

The 2013 ITF Men's Circuit was the 2013 edition of the entry level tour for men's professional tennis, and the third tier tennis tour below the Association of Tennis Professionals, World Tour and Challenger Tour. It was organised by the International Tennis Federation (ITF) which also organizes the ITF Women's Circuit, an entry-level tour for women's professional tennis. Later tournaments were organized to offer either $10,000 or $15,000 in prize money and tournaments which offered hospitality to players competing in the main draw to give additional ranking points which are valid under the ATP ranking system, and were organized by a national association or approved by the ITF Men's Circuit Committee.

The tournaments were played on a rectangular flat surface, commonly called a tennis court. The dimensions of a tennis court are defined and regulated by the ITF and the court is 23.78 meters (78.0 feet) long, 10.97 meters (36.0 feet) wide. Its width is 8.23 meters (27.0 feet) for singles matches and 10.97 meters (36.0 feet) for doubles matches. Tennis is played on a variety of surfaces and each surface has its own characteristics which affect playing style. The four main types of courts, depending on the materials used for the surface, are clay, hard, grass and carpet courts, with the ITF classifying five different pace settings ranging from slow to fast.

== Point distribution ==
Tournament Category	W	F	SF	QF	R16	R32
Futures 15,000+H	35	20	10	4	1	0
Futures 15,000	27	15	8	3	1	0
Futures 10,000+H	27	15	8	3	1	0
Futures 10,000	18	10	6	2	1	0

== Key ==
$15,000 tournaments
$10,000 tournaments

== Month ==
=== April ===
Week of	Tournament	Winner	Runners-up	Semifinalists	Quarterfinalists
April 1	Egypt F1 Futures; Cairo, Egypt; Clay $10,000	(Spain) Juan Lizariturry; 6–1, 6–4	(Spain) Albert Alcaraz-Ivorra	(Spain) Enrique López Pérez (Egypt) Sherif Sabry	(Spain) Pol Toledo Bagué (Sweden) Elias Ymer (Netherlands) Stephan Fransen (Italy) Enrico Burzi
April 1	Egypt F1 Futures; Cairo, Egypt; Clay $10,000	(Netherlands) Stephan Fransen (Netherlands) Wesley Koolhof; 6–2, 6–3	(Egypt) Karim-Mohamed Maamoun (Egypt) Sherif Sabry	(Spain) Enrique López Pérez (Egypt) Sherif Sabry	(Spain) Pol Toledo Bagué (Sweden) Elias Ymer (Netherlands) Stephan Fransen (Italy) Enrico Burzi
April 1	Greece F1 Futures; Heraklion, Greece; Hard $10,000	(France) Martin Vaïsse; 6–4, 6–2	(United Kingdom) Joshua Milton	(France) Jérôme Inzerillo (Spain) Carlos Gómez-Herrera	(United Kingdom) Josh Goodall (France) Maxime Tchoutakian (Germany) Tim Nekic (Israel) Tal Eros
April 1	Greece F1 Futures; Heraklion, Greece; Hard $10,000	(United Kingdom) Josh Goodall (United Kingdom) Harry Meehan; Walkover	(Greece) Alexandros Jakupovic (France) Yannick Jankovits	(France) Jérôme Inzerillo (Spain) Carlos Gómez-Herrera	(United Kingdom) Josh Goodall (France) Maxime Tchoutakian (Germany) Tim Nekic (Israel) Tal Eros
April 1	Italy F2 Futures; Rome, Italy; Clay $15,000	(Spain) Javier Martí; 6–1, 6–0	(France) Jonathan Eysseric	(Italy) Daniele Giorgini (Germany) Kevin Krawietz	(Italy) Alberto Brizzi (Argentina) Andrés Molteni (Serbia) Ivan Bjelica (Italy) Omar Giacalone
April 1	Italy F2 Futures; Rome, Italy; Clay $15,000	(Italy) Alessandro Motti (Italy) Matteo Volante; 6–2, 6–3	(Italy) Daniele Giorgini (Italy) Francesco Picco	(Italy) Daniele Giorgini (Germany) Kevin Krawietz	(Italy) Alberto Brizzi (Argentina) Andrés Molteni (Serbia) Ivan Bjelica (Italy) Omar Giacalone
April 1	Japan F4 Futures; Tsukuba, Japan; Hard $10,000	(Japan) Yuichi Ito; 6–3, 3–6, 6–2	(Japan) Issei Okamura	(Japan) Kaichi Uchida (Japan) Takuto Niki	(Japan) Yuuya Kibi (Japan) Masato Shiga (Japan) Gengo Kikuchi (South Korea) Kim Cheong-eui
April 1	Japan F4 Futures; Tsukuba, Japan; Hard $10,000	(Japan) Daiki Kondo (Japan) Masato Shiga; 6–3, 7–6^{(7–2)}	(Japan) Yuichi Ito (Japan) Shota Tagawa	(Japan) Kaichi Uchida (Japan) Takuto Niki	(Japan) Yuuya Kibi (Japan) Masato Shiga (Japan) Gengo Kikuchi (South Korea) Kim Cheong-eui
April 1	Qatar F1 Futures; Doha, Qatar; Hard $10,000	(Slovakia) Marek Semjan; 3–6, 7–6^{(7–4)}, 7–6^{(8–6)}	(United Kingdom) Daniel Cox	(Colombia) Cristian Rodríguez (Italy) Roberto Marcora	(Portugal) André Gaspar Murta (Belgium) Joris De Loore (Germany) Peter Heller (France) Jules Marie
April 1	Qatar F1 Futures; Doha, Qatar; Hard $10,000	(United Kingdom) James Marsalek (Slovakia) Marek Semjan; 6–2, 4–6, [10–7]	(France) Rudy Coco (France) Jules Marie	(Colombia) Cristian Rodríguez (Italy) Roberto Marcora	(Portugal) André Gaspar Murta (Belgium) Joris De Loore (Germany) Peter Heller (France) Jules Marie
April 1	Spain F9 Futures; Villajoyosa, Spain; Carpet $10,000	(Spain) Roberto Ortega Olmedo; 6–0, 5–7, 6–3	(Spain) Gerard Granollers	(Japan) Taro Daniel (Spain) José Checa Calvo	(Spain) Edualdo Bonet-de Gispert (Spain) David Estruch (Germany) Jean-Marc Werner (Spain) David Pérez Sanz
April 1	Spain F9 Futures; Villajoyosa, Spain; Carpet $10,000	(Spain) Oriol Roca Batalla (Spain) Andoni Vivanco-Guzmán; 6–4, 3–6, [10–8]	(Spain) Eduard Esteve Lobato (Spain) Gerard Granollers	(Japan) Taro Daniel (Spain) José Checa Calvo	(Spain) Edualdo Bonet-de Gispert (Spain) David Estruch (Germany) Jean-Marc Werner (Spain) David Pérez Sanz
April 1	Turkey F13 Futures; Antalya-Belconti, Turkey; Hard $10,000	(Argentina) Maximiliano Estévez; 6–1, 6–1	(Belgium) Julien Dubail	(Switzerland) Yann Marti (Czech Republic) Jan Šátral	(Dominican Republic) José Hernández-Fernández (Argentina) Juan Ignacio Londero (Belgium) Yannick Vandenbulcke (Germany) Robin Kern
April 1	Turkey F13 Futures; Antalya-Belconti, Turkey; Hard $10,000	(Argentina) Maximiliano Estévez (Dominican Republic) José Hernández-Fernández; 6–3, 7–5	(Argentina) Juan Ignacio Londero (Argentina) Mateo Nicolás Martínez	(Switzerland) Yann Marti (Czech Republic) Jan Šátral	(Dominican Republic) José Hernández-Fernández (Argentina) Juan Ignacio Londero (Belgium) Yannick Vandenbulcke (Germany) Robin Kern
April 1	Vietnam F2 Futures; Ho Chi Minh City, Vietnam; Hard $10,000	(France) Laurent Recouderc; 6–3, 6–4	(United States) Nicolas Meister	(South Korea) Kim Jae-hwan (France) Lucas Pouille	(Germany) Torsten Wietoska (Australia) Dane Propoggia (United Kingdom) Andrew Fitzpatrick (India) Jeevan Nedunchezhiyan
April 1	Vietnam F2 Futures; Ho Chi Minh City, Vietnam; Hard $10,000	(United Kingdom) Andrew Fitzpatrick (United Kingdom) Joshua Ward-Hibbert; 6–4, 6–2	(Cambodia) Bun Kenny (South Korea) Kim Jae-hwan	(South Korea) Kim Jae-hwan (France) Lucas Pouille	(Germany) Torsten Wietoska (Australia) Dane Propoggia (United Kingdom) Andrew Fitzpatrick (India) Jeevan Nedunchezhiyan
April 8	China F1 Futures; Chengdu, China; Hard $15,000	(China) Wu Di; 7–5, 2–6, 6–4	(Netherlands) Boy Westerhof	(Australia) Nick Kyrgios (Thailand) Danai Udomchoke	(Australia) Alex Bolt (Australia) Blake Mott (Chinese Taipei) Yang Tsung-hua (Japan) Hiroki Kondo
April 8	China F1 Futures; Chengdu, China; Hard $15,000	(Japan) Yuichi Ito (Japan) Hiroki Kondo; 6–4, 6–4	(Australia) Brydan Klein (Thailand) Danai Udomchoke	(Australia) Nick Kyrgios (Thailand) Danai Udomchoke	(Australia) Alex Bolt (Australia) Blake Mott (Chinese Taipei) Yang Tsung-hua (Japan) Hiroki Kondo
April 8	Egypt F2 Futures; Cairo, Egypt; Clay $10,000	(Spain) Enrique López Pérez; 2–6, 6–0, 6–4	(Spain) Pol Toledo Bagué	(Netherlands) Wesley Koolhof (Spain) Juan Lizariturry	(Italy) Enrico Burzi (Portugal) Vasco Mensurado (Italy) Giulio Torroni (Egypt) Mohamed Safwat
April 8	Egypt F2 Futures; Cairo, Egypt; Clay $10,000	(Netherlands) Stephan Fransen (Netherlands) Wesley Koolhof; 6–0, 6–3	(Spain) Enrique López Pérez (Netherlands) Mark Vervoort	(Netherlands) Wesley Koolhof (Spain) Juan Lizariturry	(Italy) Enrico Burzi (Portugal) Vasco Mensurado (Italy) Giulio Torroni (Egypt) Mohamed Safwat
April 8	France F7 Futures; Angers, France; Clay (indoor) $15,000+H	(Belgium) Niels Desein; 6–3, 6–2	(France) Calvin Hemery	(France) Vincent Millot (France) Enzo Py	(Germany) Tim Pütz (France) Johan Tatlot (France) Simon Cauvard (France) Romain Jouan
April 8	France F7 Futures; Angers, France; Clay (indoor) $15,000+H	(Serbia) Ivan Bjelica (Serbia) Miljan Zekić; 6–3, 6–4	(Belgium) Niels Desein (Germany) Tim Pütz	(France) Vincent Millot (France) Enzo Py	(Germany) Tim Pütz (France) Johan Tatlot (France) Simon Cauvard (France) Romain Jouan
April 8	Greece F2 Futures; Heraklion, Greece; Hard $10,000	(Spain) Andrés Artuñedo; 6–3, 7–6^{(7–2)}	(Spain) Carlos Gómez-Herrera	(France) Rémi Boutillier (Slovakia) Adrian Sikora	(Spain) Iván Arenas-Gualda (Greece) Theodoros Angelinos (Greece) Alexandros Jakupovic (Belgium) Kimmer Coppejans
April 8	Greece F2 Futures; Heraklion, Greece; Hard $10,000	(Canada) Érik Chvojka (France) Mathieu Rodrigues; 6–1, 6–3	(Spain) José Checa Calvo (Slovakia) Adrian Sikora	(France) Rémi Boutillier (Slovakia) Adrian Sikora	(Spain) Iván Arenas-Gualda (Greece) Theodoros Angelinos (Greece) Alexandros Jakupovic (Belgium) Kimmer Coppejans
April 8	Italy F3 Futures; Vercelli, Italy; Clay $15,000	(Italy) Alberto Brizzi; 6–3, 7–5	(Germany) Moritz Baumann	(Belgium) Yannick Mertens (Netherlands) Thomas Schoorel	(Italy) Andrea Arnaboldi (Italy) Filippo Baldi (Italy) Riccardo Bellotti (Italy) Daniele Giorgini
April 8	Italy F3 Futures; Vercelli, Italy; Clay $15,000	(Argentina) Andrés Molteni (Finland) Timo Nieminen; 6–0, 6–2	(Italy) Filippo Baldi (Italy) Pietro Licciardi	(Belgium) Yannick Mertens (Netherlands) Thomas Schoorel	(Italy) Andrea Arnaboldi (Italy) Filippo Baldi (Italy) Riccardo Bellotti (Italy) Daniele Giorgini
April 8	Qatar F2 Futures; Doha, Qatar; Hard	(Slovakia) Marek Semjan; 3–6, 6–6 Ret.	(India) Yuki Bhambri	(France) Matthieu Roy (Belgium) Joris De Loore	(Spain) Jordi Samper Montaña (Italy) Roberto Marcora (United Kingdom) James Marsalek (United Kingdom) Daniel Cox
April 8	Qatar F2 Futures; Doha, Qatar; Hard	(Belgium) Joris De Loore (Switzerland) Riccardo Maiga; 6–4, 6–3	(Colombia) Cristian Rodríguez (Spain) Jordi Samper Montaña	(France) Matthieu Roy (Belgium) Joris De Loore	(Spain) Jordi Samper Montaña (Italy) Roberto Marcora (United Kingdom) James Marsalek (United Kingdom) Daniel Cox
April 8	Turkey F14 Futures; Antalya-Belconti, Turkey; Hard $10,000	(Brazil) Thiago Monteiro; 7–6^{(7–2)}, 6–4	(Czech Republic) Jan Minář	(Switzerland) Adrien Bossel (Argentina) Maximiliano Estévez	(Germany) Maximilian Marterer (Ukraine) Vadim Alekseenko (Switzerland) Stéphane Bohli (United Kingdom) Tom Farquharson
April 8	Turkey F14 Futures; Antalya-Belconti, Turkey; Hard $10,000	(Argentina) Maximiliano Estévez (Dominican Republic) José Hernández-Fernández; 6–2, 6–1	(Moldova) Andrei Ciumac (Switzerland) Luca Margaroli	(Switzerland) Adrien Bossel (Argentina) Maximiliano Estévez	(Germany) Maximilian Marterer (Ukraine) Vadim Alekseenko (Switzerland) Stéphane Bohli (United Kingdom) Tom Farquharson
April 8	USA F9 Futures; Oklahoma City, United States; Hard $15,000	(South Africa) Rik de Voest; 6–3, 6–2	(United Kingdom) Alex Bogdanovic	(India) Saketh Myneni (Australia) Matt Reid	(South Africa) Tucker Vorster (United States) Mico Santiago (United Kingdom) David Rice (United States) Chase Buchanan
April 8	USA F9 Futures; Oklahoma City, United States; Hard $15,000	(United States) Jean-Yves Aubone (United States) Dennis Nevolo; 6–1, 7–5	(India) Saketh Myneni (New Zealand) Artem Sitak	(India) Saketh Myneni (Australia) Matt Reid	(South Africa) Tucker Vorster (United States) Mico Santiago (United Kingdom) David Rice (United States) Chase Buchanan
April 8	Vietnam F3 Futures; Ho Chi Minh City, Vietnam; Hard $10,000	(France) Lucas Pouille; 7–6^{(7–4)}, 6–2	(France) Mathias Bourgue	(United States) Nicolas Meister (United Kingdom) Joshua Ward-Hibbert	(United States) Connor Farren (South Korea) Nam Ji-sung (India) Jeevan Nedunchezhiyan (Germany) Matthias Wunner
April 8	Vietnam F3 Futures; Ho Chi Minh City, Vietnam; Hard $10,000	(United Kingdom) Andrew Fitzpatrick (United Kingdom) Joshua Ward-Hibbert; 4–6, 7–6^{(9–7)}, [11–9]	(New Zealand) Logan MacKenzie (Australia) Dane Propoggia	(United States) Nicolas Meister (United Kingdom) Joshua Ward-Hibbert	(United States) Connor Farren (South Korea) Nam Ji-sung (India) Jeevan Nedunchezhiyan (Germany) Matthias Wunner
April 15	Chile F1 Futures; Santiago, Chile; Clay $10,000	(Bolivia) Hugo Dellien; 6–4, 6–7^{(6–8)}, 7–6^{(7–2)}	(Chile) Gonzalo Lama	(Brazil) Fabrício Neis (Chile) Guillermo Núñez	(Brazil) Eduardo Dischinger (Argentina) Federico Coria (Chile) Felipe Ríos (Chile) Cristóbal Saavedra Corvalán
April 15	Chile F1 Futures; Santiago, Chile; Clay $10,000	(Peru) Mauricio Echazú (Chile) Cristóbal Saavedra Corvalán; 5–7, 6–1, [10–8]	(Argentina) Luciano Doria (Japan) Ryusei Makiguchi	(Brazil) Fabrício Neis (Chile) Guillermo Núñez	(Brazil) Eduardo Dischinger (Argentina) Federico Coria (Chile) Felipe Ríos (Chile) Cristóbal Saavedra Corvalán
April 15	China F2 Futures; Chengdu, China; Hard $15,000	(China) Wu Di; 6–3, 6–3	(Australia) Nick Kyrgios	(Chinese Taipei) Yang Tsung-hua (Australia) Alex Bolt	(Netherlands) Boy Westerhof (China) Gong Maoxin (China) Chang Yu (Hungary) Márton Fucsovics
April 15	China F2 Futures; Chengdu, China; Hard $15,000	(China) Gong Maoxin (China) Zeng Shaoxuan; 6–7^{(4–7)}, 6–3, [10–8]	(Japan) Hiroki Moriya (Japan) Yasutaka Uchiyama	(Chinese Taipei) Yang Tsung-hua (Australia) Alex Bolt	(Netherlands) Boy Westerhof (China) Gong Maoxin (China) Chang Yu (Hungary) Márton Fucsovics
April 15	Egypt F3 Futures; Sharm El Sheikh, Egypt; Clay $10,000	(Egypt) Mohamed Safwat; 6–4, 6–2	(Russia) Ivan Nedelko	(Egypt) Sherif Sabry (Croatia) Kristijan Mesaroš	(Spain) Enrique López Pérez (Austria) Tristan-Samuel Weissborn (Egypt) Karim-Mohamed Maamoun (Bulgaria) Alexandar Lazov
April 15	Egypt F3 Futures; Sharm El Sheikh, Egypt; Clay $10,000	(Austria) Gibril Diarra (Austria) Tristan-Samuel Weissborn; 7–6^{(9–7)}, 3–6, [13–11]	(Estonia) Vladimir Ivanov (Russia) Ivan Nedelko	(Egypt) Sherif Sabry (Croatia) Kristijan Mesaroš	(Spain) Enrique López Pérez (Austria) Tristan-Samuel Weissborn (Egypt) Karim-Mohamed Maamoun (Bulgaria) Alexandar Lazov
April 15	France F8 Futures; Ajaccio, France; Clay $15,000+H	(Bosnia and Herzegovina) Mirza Bašić; 6–4, 6–4	(France) Romain Jouan	(France) David Guez (France) Vincent Millot	(Italy) Andrea Arnaboldi (Belgium) Niels Desein (Belgium) Yannick Mertens (United Kingdom) Alexander Ward
April 15	France F8 Futures; Ajaccio, France; Clay $15,000+H	(Belgium) Niels Desein (Belgium) Yannick Mertens; 6–2, 6–2	(United Kingdom) Daniel Smethurst (United Kingdom) Alexander Ward	(France) David Guez (France) Vincent Millot	(Italy) Andrea Arnaboldi (Belgium) Niels Desein (Belgium) Yannick Mertens (United Kingdom) Alexander Ward
April 15	Greece F3 Futures; Heraklion, Greece; Hard $10,000	(Belgium) Germain Gigounon; 6–0, 4–6, 7–6^{(7–5)}	(France) Alexis Musialek	(Canada) Érik Chvojka (Spain) Andrés Artuñedo	(United Kingdom) Josh Goodall (Spain) Carlos Gómez-Herrera (Belgium) Kimmer Coppejans (Spain) José Checa Calvo
April 15	Greece F3 Futures; Heraklion, Greece; Hard $10,000	(Italy) Salvatore Caruso (Canada) Érik Chvojka; 6–4, 6–2	(Belgium) Julien Cagnina (Belgium) Germain Gigounon	(Canada) Érik Chvojka (Spain) Andrés Artuñedo	(United Kingdom) Josh Goodall (Spain) Carlos Gómez-Herrera (Belgium) Kimmer Coppejans (Spain) José Checa Calvo
April 15	Italy F4 Futures; Padova, Italy; Clay $15,000	(Australia) Jason Kubler; 6–1, 6–4	(Spain) Jordi Samper Montaña	(Italy) Daniele Giorgini (Italy) Matteo Trevisan	(Australia) Jordan Thompson (Germany) Kevin Krawietz (Serbia) Miljan Zekić (Netherlands) Thomas Schoorel
April 15	Italy F4 Futures; Padova, Italy; Clay $15,000	(Italy) Matteo Donati (Kazakhstan) Andrey Golubev; 7–6^{(8–6)}, 3–6, [10–6]	(Croatia) Mate Delić (Croatia) Joško Topić	(Italy) Daniele Giorgini (Italy) Matteo Trevisan	(Australia) Jordan Thompson (Germany) Kevin Krawietz (Serbia) Miljan Zekić (Netherlands) Thomas Schoorel
April 15	Turkey F15 Futures; Antalya-Belconti, Turkey; Hard $10,000	(Brazil) Thiago Monteiro; 6–3, 7–6^{(7–5)}	(Dominican Republic) José Hernández-Fernández	(Moldova) Radu Albot (United Kingdom) Tom Farquharson	(United Kingdom) Neil Pauffley (Ukraine) Vadim Alekseenko (Czech Republic) Adam Pavlásek (United Kingdom) Jack Carpenter
April 15	Turkey F15 Futures; Antalya-Belconti, Turkey; Hard $10,000	(Argentina) Juan Ignacio Londero (Argentina) Mateo Nicolás Martínez; 6–4, 6–4	(Russia) Mikhail Biryukov (Moldova) Maxim Dubarenco	(Moldova) Radu Albot (United Kingdom) Tom Farquharson	(United Kingdom) Neil Pauffley (Ukraine) Vadim Alekseenko (Czech Republic) Adam Pavlásek (United Kingdom) Jack Carpenter
April 15	USA F10 Futures; Little Rock, United States; Hard $15,000	(United States) Austin Krajicek; 6–4, 6–2	(Australia) Luke Saville	(Barbados) Darian King (Australia) Benjamin Mitchell	(United States) Kevin King (United States) Jean-Yves Aubone (United States) Dennis Nevolo (United States) Mico Santiago
April 15	USA F10 Futures; Little Rock, United States; Hard $15,000	(United States) Chase Buchanan (United States) Austin Krajicek; 6–2, 6–3	(United Kingdom) David Rice (United Kingdom) Sean Thornley	(Barbados) Darian King (Australia) Benjamin Mitchell	(United States) Kevin King (United States) Jean-Yves Aubone (United States) Dennis Nevolo (United States) Mico Santiago
April 15	Uzbekistan F1 Futures; Namangan, Uzbekistan; Hard $15,000	(Belarus) Aliaksandr Bury; 6–7^{(4–7)}, 6–2, 6–4	(Slovakia) Marek Semjan	(Russia) Konstantin Kravchuk (Uzbekistan) Sarvar Ikramov	(Russia) Alexander Kudryavtsev (Belarus) Egor Gerasimov (Russia) Mikhail Fufygin (India) Ranjeet Virali-Murugesan
April 15	Uzbekistan F1 Futures; Namangan, Uzbekistan; Hard $15,000	(Chinese Taipei) Chen Ti (Slovakia) Marek Semjan; 6–2, 7–6^{(7–3)}	(Belarus) Siarhei Betau (Belarus) Dzmitry Zhyrmont	(Russia) Konstantin Kravchuk (Uzbekistan) Sarvar Ikramov	(Russia) Alexander Kudryavtsev (Belarus) Egor Gerasimov (Russia) Mikhail Fufygin (India) Ranjeet Virali-Murugesan
April 22	Argentina F3 Futures; Villa del Dique, Argentina; Clay $10,000	(Bolivia) Hugo Dellien; 7–6^{(7–3)}, 2–6, 6–3	(Argentina) Gabriel Alejandro Hidalgo	(Japan) Ryusei Makiguchi (Argentina) Federico Coria	(Brazil) Pedro Sakamoto (Argentina) Juan Pablo Ortiz (Argentina) Matías Rodolfo Buchhass (Argentina) Joaquín-Jesús Monteferrario
April 22	Argentina F3 Futures; Villa del Dique, Argentina; Clay $10,000	(Argentina) Gabriel Alejandro Hidalgo (Argentina) Mauricio Pérez Mota; 6–4, 4–6, [10–8]	(Argentina) Tomás Buchhass (Argentina) Santiago Maccio	(Japan) Ryusei Makiguchi (Argentina) Federico Coria	(Brazil) Pedro Sakamoto (Argentina) Juan Pablo Ortiz (Argentina) Matías Rodolfo Buchhass (Argentina) Joaquín-Jesús Monteferrario
April 22	Chile F2 Futures; Santiago, Chile; Clay $15,000+H	(Chile) Gonzalo Lama; 5–7, 7–6^{(10–8)}, 6–2	(Brazil) Wilson Leite	(Peru) Mauricio Echazú (Spain) David Pérez Sanz	(Chile) Jorge Aguilar (Chile) Cristóbal Saavedra Corvalán (Brazil) André Miele (United States) Jesse Witten
April 22	Chile F2 Futures; Santiago, Chile; Clay $15,000+H	(Brazil) Eduardo Dischinger (Brazil) Fabrício Neis; 2–6, 6–2, [10–3]	(Chile) Guillermo Rivera Aránguiz (Chile) Cristóbal Saavedra Corvalán	(Peru) Mauricio Echazú (Spain) David Pérez Sanz	(Chile) Jorge Aguilar (Chile) Cristóbal Saavedra Corvalán (Brazil) André Miele (United States) Jesse Witten
April 22	China F3 Futures; Yuxi, China; Hard $15,000	(Australia) Nick Kyrgios; 7–5, 6–1	(Netherlands) Boy Westerhof	(Japan) Hiroki Moriya (China) Chang Yu	(China) Cao Zhaoyi (China) Li Zhe (Hungary) Márton Fucsovics (Serbia) Danilo Petrović
April 22	China F3 Futures; Yuxi, China; Hard $15,000	(Japan) Hiroki Moriya (Japan) Yasutaka Uchiyama; 2–6, 6–4, [10–6]	(Australia) Brydan Klein (New Zealand) José Statham	(Japan) Hiroki Moriya (China) Chang Yu	(China) Cao Zhaoyi (China) Li Zhe (Hungary) Márton Fucsovics (Serbia) Danilo Petrović
April 22	Egypt F4 Futures; Sharm El Sheikh, Egypt; Clay $10,000	(Egypt) Mohamed Safwat; 6–2, 1–6, 6–3	(Italy) Gianluigi Quinzi	(Austria) Tristan-Samuel Weissborn (Russia) Ivan Nedelko	(Germany) Peter Heller (Austria) Lukas Jastraunig (Egypt) Karim Hossam (Croatia) Kristijan Mesaroš
April 22	Egypt F4 Futures; Sharm El Sheikh, Egypt; Clay $10,000	(Austria) Thomas Statzberger (Austria) Tristan-Samuel Weissborn; 4–6, 6–4, [10–6]	(Austria) Lukas Jastraunig (Austria) David Pamminger	(Austria) Tristan-Samuel Weissborn (Russia) Ivan Nedelko	(Germany) Peter Heller (Austria) Lukas Jastraunig (Egypt) Karim Hossam (Croatia) Kristijan Mesaroš
April 22	France F9 Futures; Grasse, France; Clay $15,000	(France) Jonathan Eysseric; 7–5, 6–1	(France) David Guez	(Serbia) Peđa Krstin (France) Nicolas Renavand	(France) Maxime Chazal (Germany) Jeremy Jahn (France) Simon Cauvard (United Kingdom) Daniel Smethurst
April 22	France F9 Futures; Grasse, France; Clay $15,000	(France) Jonathan Eysseric (France) Nicolas Renavand; 7–6^{(8–6)}, 6–4	(Germany) Jeremy Jahn (Germany) Tim Pütz	(Serbia) Peđa Krstin (France) Nicolas Renavand	(France) Maxime Chazal (Germany) Jeremy Jahn (France) Simon Cauvard (United Kingdom) Daniel Smethurst
April 22	Great Britain F9 Futures; Bournemouth, United Kingdom; Clay $10,000	(Croatia) Borna Ćorić; 6–7^{(4–7)}, 6–4, 6–3	(United Kingdom) Daniel Cox	(Italy) Enrico Burzi (United Kingdom) Ashley Hewitt	(New Zealand) Cameron Norrie (United Kingdom) Andrew Fitzpatrick (United Kingdom) Alexander Slabinsky (Italy) Alessandro Bega
April 22	Great Britain F9 Futures; Bournemouth, United Kingdom; Clay $10,000	(United Kingdom) Richard Gabb (United Kingdom) Neal Skupski; 6–3, 2–6, [10–3]	(United Kingdom) Jack Carpenter (United Kingdom) Ashley Hewitt	(Italy) Enrico Burzi (United Kingdom) Ashley Hewitt	(New Zealand) Cameron Norrie (United Kingdom) Andrew Fitzpatrick (United Kingdom) Alexander Slabinsky (Italy) Alessandro Bega
April 22	Greece F4 Futures; Heraklion, Greece; Hard $10,000	(Belgium) Germain Gigounon; 6–3, 7–5	(Belgium) Kimmer Coppejans	(France) Alexis Musialek (United Kingdom) Edward Corrie	(Canada) Érik Chvojka (Australia) Andrew Whittington (Bulgaria) Dimitar Kuzmanov (France) Rémi Boutillier
April 22	Greece F4 Futures; Heraklion, Greece; Hard $10,000	(France) Sébastien Boltz (France) Tristan Lamasine; 6–3, 4–6, [10–4]	(France) Rémi Boutillier (France) Alexis Musialek	(France) Alexis Musialek (United Kingdom) Edward Corrie	(Canada) Érik Chvojka (Australia) Andrew Whittington (Bulgaria) Dimitar Kuzmanov (France) Rémi Boutillier
April 22	Israel F7 Futures; Ashkelon, Israel; Hard $10,000	(France) Enzo Couacaud; 7–5, 6–1	(Japan) Takuto Niki	(Japan) Shuichi Sekiguchi (Australia) Gavin van Peperzeel	(Israel) Bar Tzuf Botzer (United Kingdom) James Marsalek (Germany) Nico Matic (Belgium) Julien Dubail
April 22	Israel F7 Futures; Ashkelon, Israel; Hard $10,000	(Israel) Gilad Ben Zvi (Israel) Saar Steele; 6–4, 6–7^{(6–8)}, [13–11]	(Netherlands) Kevin Griekspoor (Netherlands) Scott Griekspoor	(Japan) Shuichi Sekiguchi (Australia) Gavin van Peperzeel	(Israel) Bar Tzuf Botzer (United Kingdom) James Marsalek (Germany) Nico Matic (Belgium) Julien Dubail
April 22	Italy F5 Futures; Vicenza, Italy; Clay $15,000	(Switzerland) Sandro Ehrat; 6–3, 7–5	(Argentina) Andrés Molteni	(Italy) Alberto Brizzi (Serbia) Nikola Ćaćić	(Italy) Edoardo Eremin (Argentina) Leandro Migani (Italy) Riccardo Bellotti (Bosnia and Herzegovina) Damir Džumhur
April 22	Italy F5 Futures; Vicenza, Italy; Clay $15,000	(Serbia) Nikola Ćaćić (Bosnia and Herzegovina) Damir Džumhur; 6–3, 6–4	(Italy) Alessandro Motti (Italy) Matteo Volante	(Italy) Alberto Brizzi (Serbia) Nikola Ćaćić	(Italy) Edoardo Eremin (Argentina) Leandro Migani (Italy) Riccardo Bellotti (Bosnia and Herzegovina) Damir Džumhur
April 22	Mexico F5 Futures; Córdoba, Mexico; Hard $15,000	(Venezuela) David Souto; 6–3, 6–3	(United States) Nicolas Meister	(Guatemala) Christopher Díaz Figueroa (United States) Adam El Mihdawy	(Mexico) Miguel Gallardo Valles (El Salvador) Marcelo Arévalo (Mexico) Daniel Garza (Croatia) Ante Pavić
April 22	Mexico F5 Futures; Córdoba, Mexico; Hard $15,000	(Dominican Republic) Víctor Estrella (Puerto Rico) Alex Llompart; 6–3, 6–3	(Philippines) Ruben Gonzales (Australia) Chris Letcher	(Guatemala) Christopher Díaz Figueroa (United States) Adam El Mihdawy	(Mexico) Miguel Gallardo Valles (El Salvador) Marcelo Arévalo (Mexico) Daniel Garza (Croatia) Ante Pavić
April 22	Spain F10 Futures; Les Franqueses del Vallès, Spain; Hard $10,000	(Spain) Iván Arenas-Gualda; Walkover	(Italy) Lorenzo Giustino	(Spain) Edualdo Bonet-de Gispert (Russia) Alexander Rumyantsev	(Argentina) Leonel Videla (France) Yannick Jankovits (France) Davy Sum (Venezuela) Jordi Muñoz Abreu
April 22	Spain F10 Futures; Les Franqueses del Vallès, Spain; Hard $10,000	(Spain) Oriol Roca Batalla (Spain) Andoni Vivanco-Guzmán; 6–2, 6–3	(Spain) Iván Arenas-Gualda (Spain) Jaime Pulgar-García	(Spain) Edualdo Bonet-de Gispert (Russia) Alexander Rumyantsev	(Argentina) Leonel Videla (France) Yannick Jankovits (France) Davy Sum (Venezuela) Jordi Muñoz Abreu
April 22	Turkey F16 Futures; Antalya-Belconti, Turkey; Hard $10,000	(Poland) Piotr Gadomski; 7–5, 6–4	(Switzerland) Yann Marti	(United Kingdom) Tom Farquharson (Poland) Grzegorz Panfil	(United States) Sean Berman (Brazil) Bruno Sant'Anna (Dominican Republic) José Hernández-Fernández (Serbia) Ilija Vučić
April 22	Turkey F16 Futures; Antalya-Belconti, Turkey; Hard $10,000	(Poland) Piotr Gadomski (Poland) Maciej Smoła; 6–3, 7–6^{(7–3)}	(Japan) Hiroyasu Ehara (Germany) Tobias Klein	(United Kingdom) Tom Farquharson (Poland) Grzegorz Panfil	(United States) Sean Berman (Brazil) Bruno Sant'Anna (Dominican Republic) José Hernández-Fernández (Serbia) Ilija Vučić
April 22	Uzbekistan F2 Futures; Andijan, Uzbekistan; Hard $15,000	(Belarus) Dzmitry Zhyrmont; 6–3, 7–6^{(8–6)}	(Slovakia) Marek Semjan	(Russia) Alexander Kudryavtsev (Chinese Taipei) Chen Ti	(Belarus) Egor Gerasimov (Russia) Alexey Vatutin (Uzbekistan) Sanjar Fayziev (Belarus) Aliaksandr Bury
April 22	Uzbekistan F2 Futures; Andijan, Uzbekistan; Hard $15,000	(Belarus) Siarhei Betau (Belarus) Dzmitry Zhyrmont; 6–2, 7–6^{(7–3)}	(Belarus) Aliaksandr Bury (Russia) Mikhail Fufygin	(Russia) Alexander Kudryavtsev (Chinese Taipei) Chen Ti	(Belarus) Egor Gerasimov (Russia) Alexey Vatutin (Uzbekistan) Sanjar Fayziev (Belarus) Aliaksandr Bury
April 29	Argentina F4 Futures; Villa del Dique, Argentina; Clay $10,000	(Argentina) Juan-Pablo Amado; 0–6, 6–3, 7–6^{(8–6)}	(Argentina) Gabriel Alejandro Hidalgo	(Argentina) Pablo Galdón (Argentina) Tomás Lipovšek Puches	(Peru) Sergio Galdós (Argentina) Juan Pablo Ortiz (Peru) Duilio Beretta (Brazil) Pedro Sakamoto
April 29	Argentina F4 Futures; Villa del Dique, Argentina; Clay $10,000	(Argentina) Gabriel Alejandro Hidalgo (Argentina) Mauricio Pérez Mota; 6–1, 6–1	(Peru) Duilio Beretta (Peru) Sergio Galdós	(Argentina) Pablo Galdón (Argentina) Tomás Lipovšek Puches	(Peru) Sergio Galdós (Argentina) Juan Pablo Ortiz (Peru) Duilio Beretta (Brazil) Pedro Sakamoto
April 29	Chile F3 Futures; Santiago, Chile; Clay $15,000+H	(Australia) James Duckworth; 6–1, 6–3	(Chile) Cristian Garín	(Chile) Gonzalo Lama (Spain) David Pérez Sanz	(Argentina) Guillermo Durán (Chile) Cristóbal Saavedra Corvalán (Chile) Guillermo Rivera Aránguiz (Chile) Nicolás Jarry
April 29	Chile F3 Futures; Santiago, Chile; Clay $15,000+H	(Chile) Cristian Garín (Chile) Nicolás Jarry; 6–2, 6–2	(Chile) Guillermo Rivera Aránguiz (Chile) Cristóbal Saavedra Corvalán	(Chile) Gonzalo Lama (Spain) David Pérez Sanz	(Argentina) Guillermo Durán (Chile) Cristóbal Saavedra Corvalán (Chile) Guillermo Rivera Aránguiz (Chile) Nicolás Jarry
April 29	Egypt F5 Futures; Sharm El Sheikh, Egypt; Clay $10,000	(Morocco) Hicham Khaddari; 6–3, 6–3	(Austria) Nicolas Reissig	(Austria) Lukas Jastraunig (Egypt) Karim Hossam	(Morocco) Younès Rachidi (Syria) Issam Haitham Taweel (Austria) Christian Trubrig (Egypt) Sherif Sabry
April 29	Egypt F5 Futures; Sharm El Sheikh, Egypt; Clay $10,000	(Austria) Nicolas Reissig (Germany) Dominik Schulz; 6–4, 6–4	(Egypt) Karim-Mohamed Maamoun (Egypt) Sherif Sabry	(Austria) Lukas Jastraunig (Egypt) Karim Hossam	(Morocco) Younès Rachidi (Syria) Issam Haitham Taweel (Austria) Christian Trubrig (Egypt) Sherif Sabry
April 29	Great Britain F10 Futures; Edinburgh, United Kingdom; Clay $10,000	(United Kingdom) Andrew Fitzpatrick; 1–6, 6–4, 6–1	(Belgium) Alexandre Folie	(Australia) Jason Kubler (United Kingdom) Ashley Hewitt	(United Kingdom) Daniel Smethurst (Croatia) Borna Ćorić (United Kingdom) Richard Gabb (United Kingdom) Luke Bambridge
April 29	Great Britain F10 Futures; Edinburgh, United Kingdom; Clay $10,000	(United Kingdom) Matthew Short (United Kingdom) Marcus Willis; 4–6, 6–4, [10–8]	(United Kingdom) Richard Gabb (United Kingdom) Jonny O'Mara	(Australia) Jason Kubler (United Kingdom) Ashley Hewitt	(United Kingdom) Daniel Smethurst (Croatia) Borna Ćorić (United Kingdom) Richard Gabb (United Kingdom) Luke Bambridge
April 29	Greece F5 Futures; Heraklion, Greece; Hard $10,000	(Bulgaria) Dimitar Kuzmanov; 6–1, 6–2	(Australia) Andrew Whittington	(Greece) Markos Kalovelonis (Greece) Alexandros Jakupovic	(France) Laurent Lokoli (Bosnia and Herzegovina) Franjo Raspudić (France) Élie Rousset (Slovenia) Tom Kočevar-Dešman
April 29	Greece F5 Futures; Heraklion, Greece; Hard $10,000	(United Kingdom) Joshua Milton (Australia) Andrew Whittington; 2–6, 6–3, [10–7]	(Canada) Hugo Di Feo (Canada) Filip Peliwo	(Greece) Markos Kalovelonis (Greece) Alexandros Jakupovic	(France) Laurent Lokoli (Bosnia and Herzegovina) Franjo Raspudić (France) Élie Rousset (Slovenia) Tom Kočevar-Dešman
April 29	India F4 Futures; Chandigarh, India; Hard $15,000	(India) Saketh Myneni; 3–6, 6–1, 6–4	(India) Vijayant Malik	(India) Ranjeet Virali-Murugesan (India) Vishnu Vardhan	(India) Yuki Bhambri (India) Rakshit Rishi (India) Vijay Sundar Prashanth (India) N. Sriram Balaji
April 29	India F4 Futures; Chandigarh, India; Hard $15,000	(India) N. Sriram Balaji (India) Ranjeet Virali-Murugesan; 6–3, 6–4	(India) Arun-Prakash Rajagopalan (India) Vishnu Vardhan	(India) Ranjeet Virali-Murugesan (India) Vishnu Vardhan	(India) Yuki Bhambri (India) Rakshit Rishi (India) Vijay Sundar Prashanth (India) N. Sriram Balaji
April 29	Israel F8 Futures; Ashkelon, Israel; Hard $10,000	(Japan) Shuichi Sekiguchi; 6–4, 6–1	(Australia) Gavin van Peperzeel	(Israel) Igor Smilansky (Republic of Ireland) Sam Barry	(Israel) Amir Weintraub (Belgium) Julien Dubail (Belgium) Yannick Vandenbulcke (United States) Michael Shabaz
April 29	Israel F8 Futures; Ashkelon, Israel; Hard $10,000	(Republic of Ireland) Sam Barry (New Zealand) Sebastian Lavie; 7–6^{(9–7)}, 2–6, [12–10]	(Japan) Takuto Niki (Japan) Arata Onozawa	(Israel) Igor Smilansky (Republic of Ireland) Sam Barry	(Israel) Amir Weintraub (Belgium) Julien Dubail (Belgium) Yannick Vandenbulcke (United States) Michael Shabaz
April 29	Italy F6 Futures; Pozzuoli, Italy; Clay $15,000	(Italy) Matteo Trevisan; 7–5, 6–2	(Italy) Lorenzo Giustino	(Argentina) Andrés Molteni (Austria) Dennis Novak	(United Kingdom) Oliver Golding (Italy) Alessandro Bega (Argentina) Juan-Martín Aranguren (Russia) Andrey Kumantsov
April 29	Italy F6 Futures; Pozzuoli, Italy; Clay $15,000	(United Kingdom) Ken Skupski (United Kingdom) Neal Skupski; 6–3, 6–3	(United Kingdom) Oliver Golding (Ukraine) Denys Mylokostov	(Argentina) Andrés Molteni (Austria) Dennis Novak	(United Kingdom) Oliver Golding (Italy) Alessandro Bega (Argentina) Juan-Martín Aranguren (Russia) Andrey Kumantsov
April 29	Kazakhstan F3 Futures; Shymkent, Kazakhstan; Clay $10,000	(Serbia) Peđa Krstin; 6–2, 6–1	(Belarus) Siarhei Betau	(Ukraine) Vladyslav Manafov (Moldova) Andrei Ciumac	(Ukraine) Ivan Anikanov (Russia) Vitaliy Kachanovskiy (Russia) Kirill Dmitriev (Belarus) Pavel Filin
April 29	Kazakhstan F3 Futures; Shymkent, Kazakhstan; Clay $10,000	(Moldova) Andrei Ciumac (Russia) Kirill Dmitriev; 7–6^{(7–5)}, 6–4	(Russia) Alexander Igoshin (Russia) Vitaliy Kachanovskiy	(Ukraine) Vladyslav Manafov (Moldova) Andrei Ciumac	(Ukraine) Ivan Anikanov (Russia) Vitaliy Kachanovskiy (Russia) Kirill Dmitriev (Belarus) Pavel Filin
April 29	Korea F1 Futures; Seoul, Korea; Hard $15,000	(United States) Daniel Nguyen; 6–1, 6–4	(South Korea) Na Jung-woong	(South Korea) Chung Hyeon (United States) Jason Jung	(Chinese Taipei) Chen Ti (South Korea) Noh Sang-woo (South Korea) Cho Min-hyeok (Japan) Kento Takeuchi
April 29	Korea F1 Futures; Seoul, Korea; Hard $15,000	(United States) Jason Jung (United States) Daniel Nguyen; 7–5, 6–1	(South Korea) Chung Hong (South Korea) Noh Sang-woo	(South Korea) Chung Hyeon (United States) Jason Jung	(Chinese Taipei) Chen Ti (South Korea) Noh Sang-woo (South Korea) Cho Min-hyeok (Japan) Kento Takeuchi
April 29	Mexico F6 Futures } Puebla, Mexico; Hard $10,000	(Mexico) Miguel Gallardo Valles; 3–6, 6–3, 6–2	(Barbados) Darian King	(Ecuador) Iván Endara (Venezuela) Luis David Martínez	(Croatia) Ante Pavić (United States) Nicolas Meister (Australia) Jonathon Cooper (United States) Adam El Mihdawy
April 29	Mexico F6 Futures } Puebla, Mexico; Hard $10,000	(Mexico) Miguel Gallardo Valles (Mexico) Alan Núñez Aguilera; 6–4, 6–1	(Barbados) Darian King (Puerto Rico) Alex Llompart	(Ecuador) Iván Endara (Venezuela) Luis David Martínez	(Croatia) Ante Pavić (United States) Nicolas Meister (Australia) Jonathon Cooper (United States) Adam El Mihdawy
April 29	Spain F12 Futures; Balaguer, Spain; Clay $10,000	(Spain) Andoni Vivanco-Guzmán; 6–4, 6–2	(Spain) Albert Alcaraz-Ivorra	(Spain) Oriol Roca Batalla (Italy) Francesco Picco	(Spain) Ferran Ventura-Martell (Germany) Jean-Marc Werner (Spain) Marcos Giraldi Requena (Spain) Eduard Esteve Lobato
April 29	Spain F12 Futures; Balaguer, Spain; Clay $10,000	(United Kingdom) Alexander Slabinsky (Spain) Ferran Ventura-Martell; 3–6, 6–3, [11–9]	(Denmark) Jesper Korsbæk Jensen (Portugal) Gonçalo Oliveira	(Spain) Oriol Roca Batalla (Italy) Francesco Picco	(Spain) Ferran Ventura-Martell (Germany) Jean-Marc Werner (Spain) Marcos Giraldi Requena (Spain) Eduard Esteve Lobato
April 29	Sweden F1 Futures; Karlskrona, Sweden; Clay $10,000	(Netherlands) Alban Meuffels; 3–6, 6–3, 6–1	(Finland) Herkko Pöllänen	(Austria) Bastian Trinker (Sweden) Patrik Rosenholm	(Canada) Érik Chvojka (Sweden) Isak Arvidsson (Sweden) Philip Moebius (Sweden) Filip Bergevi
April 29	Sweden F1 Futures; Karlskrona, Sweden; Clay $10,000	(Canada) Érik Chvojka (Sweden) Patrik Rosenholm; 6–1, 6–1	(Sweden) Christian Lindell (Sweden) Stefan Milenkovic	(Austria) Bastian Trinker (Sweden) Patrik Rosenholm	(Canada) Érik Chvojka (Sweden) Isak Arvidsson (Sweden) Philip Moebius (Sweden) Filip Bergevi
April 29	Turkey F17 Futures; Antalya-Belconti, Turkey; Hard $10,000	(Brazil) Tiago Fernandes; 7–5, 6–3	(France) Jules Marie	(United States) Sean Berman (Hungary) Viktor Filipenkó	(Japan) Hiroyasu Ehara (France) Dorian Descloix (Italy) Damiano Di Ienno (Lithuania) Julius Tverijonas
April 29	Turkey F17 Futures; Antalya-Belconti, Turkey; Hard $10,000	(Japan) Hiroyasu Ehara (Germany) Tobias Klein; 7–6^{(7–3)}, 6–1	(Serbia) Denis Bejtulahi (Hungary) Viktor Filipenkó	(United States) Sean Berman (Hungary) Viktor Filipenkó	(Japan) Hiroyasu Ehara (France) Dorian Descloix (Italy) Damiano Di Ienno (Lithuania) Julius Tverijonas
April 29	USA F11 Futures; Vero Beach, United States; Clay $10,000	(United Kingdom) Kyle Edmund; 6–3, 6–2	(Australia) Carsten Ball	(Japan) Yoshihito Nishioka (United States) Mitchell Krueger	(Latvia) Mārtiņš Podžus (United States) Bjorn Fratangelo (Australia) Benjamin Mitchell (Russia) Oleg Dmitriev
April 29	USA F11 Futures; Vero Beach, United States; Clay $10,000	(Serbia) Vladimir Obradović (Finland) Juho Paukku; Walkover	(Australia) Carsten Ball (Mexico) Daniel Garza	(Japan) Yoshihito Nishioka (United States) Mitchell Krueger	(Latvia) Mārtiņš Podžus (United States) Bjorn Fratangelo (Australia) Benjamin Mitchell (Russia) Oleg Dmitriev

=== May ===
Week of	Tournament	Winner	Runners-up	Semifinalists	Quarterfinalists
May 6	Argentina F5 Futures; Villa María, Argentina; Clay $10,000	(Argentina) Gabriel Alejandro Hidalgo; 6–4, 6–1	(Argentina) Juan Ignacio Londero	(Argentina) Gonzalo Villanueva (Argentina) Pedro Cachin	(Argentina) Fabricio Burdisso (Argentina) Pablo Galdón (Argentina) Federico Coria (Peru) Sergio Galdós
May 6	Argentina F5 Futures; Villa María, Argentina; Clay $10,000	(Argentina) Juan-Pablo Amado (Peru) Sergio Galdós; 6–1, 6–2	(Argentina) Hernán Casanova (Argentina) Juan Ignacio Galarza	(Argentina) Gonzalo Villanueva (Argentina) Pedro Cachin	(Argentina) Fabricio Burdisso (Argentina) Pablo Galdón (Argentina) Federico Coria (Peru) Sergio Galdós
May 6	Egypt F6 Futures; Sharm El Sheikh, Egypt; Clay $10,000	(Morocco) Yassine Idmbarek; 7–5, 4–6, 7–6^{(7–5)}	(Germany) Kevin Krawietz	(Russia) Stanislav Vovk (Italy) Gianluigi Quinzi	(Czech Republic) Jan Blecha (Russia) Ivan Nedelko (Egypt) Sherif Sabry (Egypt) Karim Hossam
May 6	Egypt F6 Futures; Sharm El Sheikh, Egypt; Clay $10,000	(Germany) Kevin Krawietz (Germany) Dominik Schulz; 6–2, 6–1	(Morocco) Younès Rachidi (Morocco) Mehdi Ziadi	(Russia) Stanislav Vovk (Italy) Gianluigi Quinzi	(Czech Republic) Jan Blecha (Russia) Ivan Nedelko (Egypt) Sherif Sabry (Egypt) Karim Hossam
May 6	Great Britain F11 Futures; Newcastle, United Kingdom; Clay $10,000	(United Kingdom) Ashley Hewitt; 4–6, 7–6^{(7–4)}, 6–3	(France) Axel Michon	(United Kingdom) Daniel Smethurst (United Kingdom) Marcus Willis	(United Kingdom) Daniel Evans (France) Julien Obry (Australia) Jason Kubler (United Kingdom) Luke Bambridge
May 6	Great Britain F11 Futures; Newcastle, United Kingdom; Clay $10,000	(United Kingdom) Luke Bambridge (United Kingdom) Cameron Norrie; 6–0, 4–6, [10–3]	(United Kingdom) Scott Clayton (United Kingdom) Toby Martin	(United Kingdom) Daniel Smethurst (United Kingdom) Marcus Willis	(United Kingdom) Daniel Evans (France) Julien Obry (Australia) Jason Kubler (United Kingdom) Luke Bambridge
May 6	Greece F6 Futures; Marathon-Athens, Greece; Hard $10,000	(Czech Republic) Michal Konečný; 5–7, 7–5, 7–5	(Canada) Filip Peliwo	(Bulgaria) Boris Nicola Bakalov (Greece) Alexandros Jakupovic	(United States) Tyler Hochwalt (Greece) Konstantinos Mikos (Greece) Theodoros Angelinos (United Kingdom) Joshua Milton
May 6	Greece F6 Futures; Marathon-Athens, Greece; Hard $10,000	(United States) Tyler Hochwalt (Czech Republic) Michal Konečný; 6–3, 7–6^{(8–6)}	(Greece) Theodoros Angelinos (Greece) Alexandros Jakupovic	(Bulgaria) Boris Nicola Bakalov (Greece) Alexandros Jakupovic	(United States) Tyler Hochwalt (Greece) Konstantinos Mikos (Greece) Theodoros Angelinos (United Kingdom) Joshua Milton
May 6	Guatemala F1 Futures; Guatemala City, Guatemala; Hard $15,000	(Colombia) Carlos Salamanca; 7–5, 6–2	(Colombia) Nicolás Barrientos	(Moldova) Roman Borvanov (Guatemala) Christopher Díaz Figueroa	(Australia) Matheson Klein (El Salvador) Marcelo Arévalo (Guatemala) Rudy Richter (Croatia) Ante Pavić
May 6	Guatemala F1 Futures; Guatemala City, Guatemala; Hard $15,000	(El Salvador) Marcelo Arévalo (Guatemala) Christopher Díaz Figueroa; 6–2, 7–6^{(7–0)}	(Moldova) Roman Borvanov (United States) Vahid Mirzadeh	(Moldova) Roman Borvanov (Guatemala) Christopher Díaz Figueroa	(Australia) Matheson Klein (El Salvador) Marcelo Arévalo (Guatemala) Rudy Richter (Croatia) Ante Pavić
May 6	India F5 Futures; Rohtak, India; Hard $15,000	(India) Saketh Myneni; 6–1, 6–2	(India) Ranjeet Virali-Murugesan	(India) Vijayant Malik (India) Jeevan Nedunchezhiyan	(India) N. Sriram Balaji (India) Vinayak Sharma Kaza (India) Vignesh Peranamallur (India) Anvit Bendre
May 6	India F5 Futures; Rohtak, India; Hard $15,000	(India) Saketh Myneni (India) Arun-Prakash Rajagopalan; 6–4, 6–3	(India) N. Sriram Balaji (India) Ranjeet Virali-Murugesan	(India) Vijayant Malik (India) Jeevan Nedunchezhiyan	(India) N. Sriram Balaji (India) Vinayak Sharma Kaza (India) Vignesh Peranamallur (India) Anvit Bendre
May 6	Israel F9 Futures; Ramat HaSharon, Israel; Hard $10,000	(United Kingdom) James Marsalek; 6–4, 7–5	(Japan) Shuichi Sekiguchi	(Israel) Or Ram-Harel (Japan) Arata Onozawa	(Netherlands) Kevin Griekspoor (Republic of Ireland) Daniel Glancy (Israel) Mor Bulis (Japan) Takuto Niki
May 6	Israel F9 Futures; Ramat HaSharon, Israel; Hard $10,000	(Japan) Takuto Niki (Japan) Arata Onozawa; 6–3, 6–4	(Republic of Ireland) Sam Barry (Republic of Ireland) Daniel Glancy	(Israel) Or Ram-Harel (Japan) Arata Onozawa	(Netherlands) Kevin Griekspoor (Republic of Ireland) Daniel Glancy (Israel) Mor Bulis (Japan) Takuto Niki
May 6	Italy F7 Futures; Pula, Italy; Clay $10,000	(Argentina) Andrés Molteni; 5–7, 6–1, 6–2	(Italy) Salvatore Caruso	(Italy) Andrea Arnaboldi (Argentina) Leandro Migani	(Australia) Omar Jasika (United Kingdom) Oliver Golding (Italy) Alessandro Petrone (Italy) Riccardo Sinicropi
May 6	Italy F7 Futures; Pula, Italy; Clay $10,000	(Italy) Andrea Arnaboldi (Italy) Andrea Basso; 6–4, 6–2	(Argentina) Leandro Migani (Argentina) Andrés Molteni	(Italy) Andrea Arnaboldi (Argentina) Leandro Migani	(Australia) Omar Jasika (United Kingdom) Oliver Golding (Italy) Alessandro Petrone (Italy) Riccardo Sinicropi
May 6	Kazakhstan F4 Futures; Shymkent, Kazakhstan; Clay $10,000	(Russia) Mikhail Biryukov; 6–1, 7–5	(Kazakhstan) Denis Yevseyev	(Poland) Paweł Ciaś (Slovakia) Filip Horanský	(Uzbekistan) Rifat Biktyakov (Russia) Alexander Igoshin (Russia) Egor Kovalev (Russia) Fedor Chervyakov
May 6	Kazakhstan F4 Futures; Shymkent, Kazakhstan; Clay $10,000	(Moldova) Andrei Ciumac (Russia) Kirill Dmitriev; 3–6, 6–2, [10–3]	(Russia) Alexander Igoshin (Russia) Vitaliy Kachanovskiy	(Poland) Paweł Ciaś (Slovakia) Filip Horanský	(Uzbekistan) Rifat Biktyakov (Russia) Alexander Igoshin (Russia) Egor Kovalev (Russia) Fedor Chervyakov
May 6	Korea F2 Futures; Seoul, Korea; Hard $15,000	(United States) Daniel Nguyen; 4–6, 7–5, 6–4	(South Korea) Chung Hyeon	(South Korea) Kim Cheong-eui (Japan) Toshihide Matsui	(Spain) Enrique López Pérez (South Korea) Cho Min-hyeok (Japan) Yusuke Watanuki (South Korea) Son Ji-hoon
May 6	Korea F2 Futures; Seoul, Korea; Hard $15,000	(South Korea) An Jae-sung (South Korea) Lim Yong-kyu; 6–3, 6–2	(South Korea) Chung Hyeon (South Korea) Nam Ji-sung	(South Korea) Kim Cheong-eui (Japan) Toshihide Matsui	(Spain) Enrique López Pérez (South Korea) Cho Min-hyeok (Japan) Yusuke Watanuki (South Korea) Son Ji-hoon
May 6	Mexico F7 Futures; Puebla, Mexico; Hard $10,000	(Mexico) Miguel Ángel Reyes-Varela; 6–7^{(5–7)}, 6–4, 7–6^{(7–1)}	(Mexico) Miguel Gallardo Valles	(Australia) Jonathon Cooper (United States) Nicolas Meister	(Canada) George Jecminek (Puerto Rico) Alex Llompart (Mexico) Carlos Palencia (France) Gianni Mina
May 6	Mexico F7 Futures; Puebla, Mexico; Hard $10,000	(United States) Connor Farren (United States) Nicolas Meister; 2–6, 7–5, [10–4]	(Puerto Rico) Alex Llompart (Mexico) Alan Núñez Aguilera	(Australia) Jonathon Cooper (United States) Nicolas Meister	(Canada) George Jecminek (Puerto Rico) Alex Llompart (Mexico) Carlos Palencia (France) Gianni Mina
May 6	Portugal F5 Futures; Castelo Branco, Portugal; Hard $10,000	(France) Mathieu Rodrigues; 6–0, 6–2	(Italy) Claudio Grassi	(Spain) Roberto Ortega Olmedo (Spain) Jaime Pulgar-García	(France) Tak Khunn Wang (Portugal) Andre Gaspar Murta (Portugal) João Domingues (Spain) Ricardo Villacorta-Alonso
May 6	Portugal F5 Futures; Castelo Branco, Portugal; Hard $10,000	(Spain) Roberto Ortega Olmedo (Spain) Ricardo Villacorta-Alonso; 6–1, 6–4	(Portugal) João Domingues (Portugal) Andre Gaspar Murta	(Spain) Roberto Ortega Olmedo (Spain) Jaime Pulgar-García	(France) Tak Khunn Wang (Portugal) Andre Gaspar Murta (Portugal) João Domingues (Spain) Ricardo Villacorta-Alonso
May 6	Russia F5 Futures; Vsevolozhsk, Russia; Carpet (indoor) $10,000	(Russia) Anton Zaitcev; 3–6, 6–2, 6–2	(Russia) Vladimir Polyakov	(Russia) Alexander Rumyantsev (Russia) Aleksandr Vasilenko	(Russia) Timur Razmaitov (Russia) Aslan Karatsev (Russia) Anton Manegin (Italy) Lorenzo Papasidero
May 6	Russia F5 Futures; Vsevolozhsk, Russia; Carpet (indoor) $10,000	(Russia) Alexandre Krasnoroutskiy (Russia) Anton Manegin; 2–6, 6–3, [10–7]	(Russia) Vladimir Polyakov (Russia) Mikhail Vaks	(Russia) Alexander Rumyantsev (Russia) Aleksandr Vasilenko	(Russia) Timur Razmaitov (Russia) Aslan Karatsev (Russia) Anton Manegin (Italy) Lorenzo Papasidero
May 6	Spain F13 Futures; Lleida, Spain; Clay $10,000	(Spain) Jordi Samper Montaña; 0–6, 6–4, 7–6^{(7–5)}	(Spain) José Checa Calvo	(Spain) Eduard Esteve Lobato (Spain) Juan Lizariturry	(Germany) Jean-Marc Werner (Spain) Albert Alcaraz-Ivorra (Italy) Francesco Picco (France) Mathias Bourgue
May 6	Spain F13 Futures; Lleida, Spain; Clay $10,000	(Spain) Miguel Ángel López Jaén (Spain) Jordi Marse-Vidri; 7–5, 6–4	(Australia) Jay Andrijic (Australia) Bradley Mousley	(Spain) Eduard Esteve Lobato (Spain) Juan Lizariturry	(Germany) Jean-Marc Werner (Spain) Albert Alcaraz-Ivorra (Italy) Francesco Picco (France) Mathias Bourgue
May 6	Sweden F2 Futures; Båstad, Sweden; Clay $10,000	(Italy) Roberto Marcora; 6–3, 7–5	(Italy) Simone Vagnozzi	(Poland) Grzegorz Panfil (Slovenia) Mike Urbanija	(France) Constant Lestienne (Poland) Marcin Gawron (Netherlands) Colin van Beem (Slovenia) Tomislav Ternar
May 6	Sweden F2 Futures; Båstad, Sweden; Clay $10,000	(Slovenia) Tomislav Ternar (Slovenia) Mike Urbanija; 4–6, 7–5, [10–8]	(Finland) Timo Nieminen (Poland) Grzegorz Panfil	(Poland) Grzegorz Panfil (Slovenia) Mike Urbanija	(France) Constant Lestienne (Poland) Marcin Gawron (Netherlands) Colin van Beem (Slovenia) Tomislav Ternar
May 6	Turkey F18 Futures; Antalya-Belconti, Turkey; Hard $10,000	(Turkey) Marsel İlhan; 6–1, 6–2	(France) Jules Marie	(United Kingdom) Tom Farquharson (United States) Sean Berman	(Japan) Hiroyasu Ehara (Serbia) Marko Tepavac (Austria) Maximilian Neuchrist (Serbia) Denis Bejtulahi
May 6	Turkey F18 Futures; Antalya-Belconti, Turkey; Hard $10,000	(Turkey) Haluk Akkoyun (Turkey) Marsel İlhan; Walkover	(Ukraine) Gleb Alekseenko (Ukraine) Vadim Alekseenko	(United Kingdom) Tom Farquharson (United States) Sean Berman	(Japan) Hiroyasu Ehara (Serbia) Marko Tepavac (Austria) Maximilian Neuchrist (Serbia) Denis Bejtulahi
May 6	USA F12 Futures; Orange Park, United States; Clay $10,000	(United States) Bjorn Fratangelo; 7–5, 6–3	(Austria) Gerald Melzer	(United Kingdom) Kyle Edmund (Mexico) Daniel Garza	(United States) Dennis Nevolo (United States) Mitchell Krueger (United States) Greg Ouellette (Australia) Greg Jones
May 6	USA F12 Futures; Orange Park, United States; Clay $10,000	(Barbados) Haydn Lewis (Austria) Gerald Melzer; 7–6^{(7–1)}, 6–2	(Austria) Sebastian Bader (United States) Erik Elliott	(United Kingdom) Kyle Edmund (Mexico) Daniel Garza	(United States) Dennis Nevolo (United States) Mitchell Krueger (United States) Greg Ouellette (Australia) Greg Jones
May 6	Venezuela F1 Futures; Maracay, Venezuela; Hard $15,000	(Dominican Republic) José Hernández; 6–3, 6–3	(Ecuador) Iván Endara	(Argentina) Maximiliano Estévez (Venezuela) David Souto	(Venezuela) Luis David Martínez (Peru) Mauricio Echazú (Venezuela) Ricardo Rodríguez (Argentina) Mateo Nicolás Martínez
May 6	Venezuela F1 Futures; Maracay, Venezuela; Hard $15,000	(Venezuela) Luis David Martínez (Venezuela) David Souto; 6–3, 7–5	(Venezuela) Piero Luisi (Venezuela) Román Recarte	(Argentina) Maximiliano Estévez (Venezuela) David Souto	(Venezuela) Luis David Martínez (Peru) Mauricio Echazú (Venezuela) Ricardo Rodríguez (Argentina) Mateo Nicolás Martínez
May 13	Argentina F6 Futures; Río Cuarto, Argentina; Clay $10,000	(Argentina) Federico Coria; 6–4, 6–4	(Chile) Ricardo Urzúa-Rivera	(Brazil) Caio Silva (Argentina) Juan-Pablo Amado	(Peru) Sergio Galdós (Argentina) Facundo Mena (Peru) Duilio Beretta (Bolivia) Hugo Dellien
May 13	Argentina F6 Futures; Río Cuarto, Argentina; Clay $10,000	(Peru) Duilio Beretta (Peru) Sergio Galdós; 4–6, 6–4, [10–1]	(Argentina) Franco Agamenone (Argentina) Jose Angel Carrizo	(Brazil) Caio Silva (Argentina) Juan-Pablo Amado	(Peru) Sergio Galdós (Argentina) Facundo Mena (Peru) Duilio Beretta (Bolivia) Hugo Dellien
May 13	Bulgaria F1 Futures; Plovdiv, Bulgaria; Clay $10,000	(Bosnia and Herzegovina) Damir Džumhur; 6–3, 6–3	(Serbia) Miljan Zekić	(Bulgaria) Dimitar Kuzmanov (France) Julien Demois	(France) Alexis Musialek (Croatia) Mate Delić (Bulgaria) Alexandar Lazov (Italy) Omar Giacalone
May 13	Bulgaria F1 Futures; Plovdiv, Bulgaria; Clay $10,000	(Bosnia and Herzegovina) Damir Džumhur (Serbia) Miljan Zekić; 7–5, 6–7^{(4–7)}, [12–10]	(Bulgaria) Dinko Halachev (Bulgaria) Petar Trendafilov	(Bulgaria) Dimitar Kuzmanov (France) Julien Demois	(France) Alexis Musialek (Croatia) Mate Delić (Bulgaria) Alexandar Lazov (Italy) Omar Giacalone
May 13	China F4 Futures; Fuzhou, China; Hard $15,000	(China) Bai Yan; 6–3, 4–2 Ret.	(United States) Jason Jung	(Japan) Kento Takeuchi (Australia) Ryan Agar	(Chinese Taipei) Huang Liang-chi (China) Li Yi-feng (Chinese Taipei) Wang Chieh-fu (China) Chang Yu
May 13	China F4 Futures; Fuzhou, China; Hard $15,000	(China) Gao Xin (China) Li Zhe; 6–4, 2–6, [12–10]	(China) Gao Peng (China) Gao Wan	(Japan) Kento Takeuchi (Australia) Ryan Agar	(Chinese Taipei) Huang Liang-chi (China) Li Yi-feng (Chinese Taipei) Wang Chieh-fu (China) Chang Yu
May 13	Czech Republic F1 Futures; Most, Czech Republic; Clay $10,000	(Slovakia) Norbert Gombos; 4–6, 6–2, 6–2	(Austria) Dominic Thiem	(Czech Republic) Jaroslav Pospíšil (Czech Republic) Michal Franěk	(Slovakia) Juraj Masár (Czech Republic) Adam Pavlásek (Slovakia) Miloslav Mečíř (Slovakia) Marek Semjan
May 13	Czech Republic F1 Futures; Most, Czech Republic; Clay $10,000	(Czech Republic) Michal Franěk (Czech Republic) Jan Kunčík; 4–6, 6–3, [10–2]	(Slovakia) Patrik Fabian (Slovakia) Norbert Gombos	(Czech Republic) Jaroslav Pospíšil (Czech Republic) Michal Franěk	(Slovakia) Juraj Masár (Czech Republic) Adam Pavlásek (Slovakia) Miloslav Mečíř (Slovakia) Marek Semjan
May 13	Egypt F7 Futures; Sharm El Sheikh, Egypt; Clay $10,000	(Russia) Ivan Nedelko; 6–1, 6–1	(Czech Republic) Jan Blecha	(Germany) Kevin Krawietz (Italy) Riccardo Sinicropi	(Russia) Stanislav Vovk (United Kingdom) Andrew Fitzpatrick (Italy) Marco Crugnola (France) Julien Obry
May 13	Egypt F7 Futures; Sharm El Sheikh, Egypt; Clay $10,000	(Italy) Marco Crugnola (Italy) Riccardo Sinicropi; 7–6^{(7–4)}, 6–2	(United Kingdom) Andrew Fitzpatrick (Spain) Andoni Vivanco-Guzmán	(Germany) Kevin Krawietz (Italy) Riccardo Sinicropi	(Russia) Stanislav Vovk (United Kingdom) Andrew Fitzpatrick (Italy) Marco Crugnola (France) Julien Obry
May 13	El Salvador F1 Futures; Santa Tecla, El Salvador; Clay $15,000	(Colombia) Carlos Salamanca; 6–3, 6–3	(Colombia) Michael Quintero	(Canada) Milan Pokrajac (Moldova) Roman Borvanov	(Colombia) Felipe Mantilla (El Salvador) Marcelo Arévalo (Guatemala) Christopher Díaz Figueroa (Australia) Matheson Klein
May 13	El Salvador F1 Futures; Santa Tecla, El Salvador; Clay $15,000	(El Salvador) Marcelo Arévalo (United States) Vahid Mirzadeh; 6–4, 6–3	(Colombia) Nicolás Barrientos (Australia) Chris Letcher	(Canada) Milan Pokrajac (Moldova) Roman Borvanov	(Colombia) Felipe Mantilla (El Salvador) Marcelo Arévalo (Guatemala) Christopher Díaz Figueroa (Australia) Matheson Klein
May 13	Greece F7 Futures; Marathon-Athens, Greece; Hard $10,000	(United Kingdom) David Rice; 6–3, 7–5	(United States) Alexios Halebian	(Canada) Filip Peliwo (United Kingdom) Josh Goodall	(Canada) Hugo Di Feo (Australia) Nick Lindahl (New Zealand) Marcus Daniell (United States) Tyler Hochwalt
May 13	Greece F7 Futures; Marathon-Athens, Greece; Hard $10,000	(New Zealand) Marcus Daniell (United Kingdom) Richard Gabb; 6–1, 6–1	(South Africa) Keith-Patrick Crowley (South Africa) Tucker Vorster	(Canada) Filip Peliwo (United Kingdom) Josh Goodall	(Canada) Hugo Di Feo (Australia) Nick Lindahl (New Zealand) Marcus Daniell (United States) Tyler Hochwalt
May 13	Italy F8 Futures; Pula, Italy; Clay $10,000	(Argentina) Andrés Molteni; 4–6, 6–3, 6–2	(Switzerland) Michael Lammer	(Italy) Salvatore Caruso (Italy) Walter Trusendi	(Belgium) Niels Desein (Italy) Pietro Licciardi (United Kingdom) Oliver Golding (Belgium) Yannick Mertens
May 13	Italy F8 Futures; Pula, Italy; Clay $10,000	(Chile) Guillermo Hormazábal (Argentina) Andrés Molteni; 6–2, 6–1	(Switzerland) Sandro Ehrat (Switzerland) Michael Lammer	(Italy) Salvatore Caruso (Italy) Walter Trusendi	(Belgium) Niels Desein (Italy) Pietro Licciardi (United Kingdom) Oliver Golding (Belgium) Yannick Mertens
May 13	Kazakhstan F5 Futures; Almaty, Kazakhstan; Clay $10,000	(Russia) Mikhail Biryukov; 1–6, 6–1, 6–4	(Slovakia) Filip Horanský	(Belarus) Pavel Filin (Ukraine) Alexandr Kushakov	(Ukraine) Ivan Anikanov (Russia) Kirill Dmitriev (Kazakhstan) Denis Yevseyev (Ukraine) Vladyslav Manafov
May 13	Kazakhstan F5 Futures; Almaty, Kazakhstan; Clay $10,000	(Moldova) Andrei Ciumac (Russia) Kirill Dmitriev; 7–5, 4–6, [10–6]	(Belarus) Pavel Filin (Belarus) Vladzimir Kruk	(Belarus) Pavel Filin (Ukraine) Alexandr Kushakov	(Ukraine) Ivan Anikanov (Russia) Kirill Dmitriev (Kazakhstan) Denis Yevseyev (Ukraine) Vladyslav Manafov
May 13	Mexico F8 Futures; Puebla, Mexico; Hard $10,000	(Mexico) Miguel Ángel Reyes-Varela; 7–6^{(7–5)}, 1–6, 6–3	(United States) Adam El Mihdawy	(Canada) George Jecminek (Mexico) Lázaro Navarro-Batles	(Burundi) Hassan Ndayishimiye (Mexico) Eduardo Peralta-Tello (Canada) Pavel Krainik (Mexico) Luis Enrique Barrientos
May 13	Mexico F8 Futures; Puebla, Mexico; Hard $10,000	(Mexico) Alejandro Moreno Figueroa (Mexico) Miguel Ángel Reyes-Varela; 5–7, 6–2, [10–7]	(Canada) George Jecminek (United States) Kirill Kasyanov	(Canada) George Jecminek (Mexico) Lázaro Navarro-Batles	(Burundi) Hassan Ndayishimiye (Mexico) Eduardo Peralta-Tello (Canada) Pavel Krainik (Mexico) Luis Enrique Barrientos
May 13	Portugal F6 Futures; Monfortinho, Portugal; Carpet $10,000	(Portugal) Frederico Ferreira Silva; 6–4, 7–6^{(7–5)}	(Spain) Iván Arenas-Gualda	(France) Élie Rousset (France) Tak Khunn Wang	(Italy) Riccardo Ghedin (Spain) Roberto Ortega Olmedo (Portugal) Andre Gaspar Murta (Spain) Ricardo Villacorta-Alonso
May 13	Portugal F6 Futures; Monfortinho, Portugal; Carpet $10,000	(Spain) Adam Sanjurjo Hermida (Spain) David Vega Hernández; 4–6, 6–2, [10–6]	(Portugal) Gonçalo Falcão (Portugal) Vasco Mensurado	(France) Élie Rousset (France) Tak Khunn Wang	(Italy) Riccardo Ghedin (Spain) Roberto Ortega Olmedo (Portugal) Andre Gaspar Murta (Spain) Ricardo Villacorta-Alonso
May 13	Romania F1 Futures; Cluj-Napoca, Romania; Clay $10,000	(Poland) Piotr Gadomski; 6–4, 6–2	(France) Maxime Chazal	(Italy) Alessandro Petrone (Monaco) Benjamin Balleret	(France) Romain Arneodo (Belgium) Germain Gigounon (Serbia) Laslo Djere (Croatia) Kristijan Mesaroš
May 13	Romania F1 Futures; Cluj-Napoca, Romania; Clay $10,000	(France) Romain Arneodo (Monaco) Benjamin Balleret; 0–6, 6–4, [10–8]	(Poland) Marcin Gawron (Poland) Andriej Kapaś	(Italy) Alessandro Petrone (Monaco) Benjamin Balleret	(France) Romain Arneodo (Belgium) Germain Gigounon (Serbia) Laslo Djere (Croatia) Kristijan Mesaroš
May 13	Russia F6 Futures; Kazan, Russia; Clay $15,000	(Ukraine) Artem Smirnov; 6–2, 6–2	(Russia) Alexander Rumyantsev	(Belarus) Egor Gerasimov (Russia) Aslan Karatsev	(Belarus) Andrei Vasilevski (Russia) Richard Muzaev (Russia) Valery Rudnev (Estonia) Vladimir Ivanov
May 13	Russia F6 Futures; Kazan, Russia; Clay $15,000	(Russia) Mikhail Fufygin (Russia) Andrei Levine; 6–2, 6–4	(Estonia) Vladimir Ivanov (Belarus) Andrei Vasilevski	(Belarus) Egor Gerasimov (Russia) Aslan Karatsev	(Belarus) Andrei Vasilevski (Russia) Richard Muzaev (Russia) Valery Rudnev (Estonia) Vladimir Ivanov
May 13	Spain F14 Futures; Valldoreix, Spain; Clay $10,000	(Japan) Taro Daniel; 6–3, 6–2	(Canada) Steven Diez	(Spain) Miguel Ángel López Jaén (Spain) Sergio Gutiérrez Ferrol	(Spain) David Pérez Sanz (France) Alexandre Favrot (Spain) Jordi Samper Montaña (New Zealand) Artem Sitak
May 13	Spain F14 Futures; Valldoreix, Spain; Clay $10,000	(Australia) Jay Andrijic (Australia) Bradley Mousley; 6–3, 6–4	(Spain) Miguel Ángel López Jaén (Spain) Jordi Marse-Vidri	(Spain) Miguel Ángel López Jaén (Spain) Sergio Gutiérrez Ferrol	(Spain) David Pérez Sanz (France) Alexandre Favrot (Spain) Jordi Samper Montaña (New Zealand) Artem Sitak
May 13	Sweden F3 Futures; Båstad, Sweden; Clay $10,000	(United Kingdom) Daniel Evans; 6–4, 7–6^{(7–4)}	(Poland) Grzegorz Panfil	(Norway) Joachim Bjerke (Sweden) Markus Eriksson	(Italy) Simone Vagnozzi (United Kingdom) Daniel Smethurst (Belgium) Alexandre Folie (Sweden) Patrik Rosenholm
May 13	Sweden F3 Futures; Båstad, Sweden; Clay $10,000	(Sweden) Christian Lindell (Sweden) Milos Sekulic; 3–6, 6–3, [10–6]	(Sweden) Jesper Brunström (Sweden) Markus Eriksson	(Norway) Joachim Bjerke (Sweden) Markus Eriksson	(Italy) Simone Vagnozzi (United Kingdom) Daniel Smethurst (Belgium) Alexandre Folie (Sweden) Patrik Rosenholm
May 13	Turkey F19 Futures; Antalya-Belconti, Turkey; Hard $10,000	(Austria) Maximilian Neuchrist; 6–2, 7–5	(United Kingdom) Jack Carpenter	(France) Jules Marie (United Kingdom) Tom Farquharson	(Italy) Damiano Di Ienno (France) Davy Sum (United Kingdom) Miles Bugby (Germany) Robin Kern
May 13	Turkey F19 Futures; Antalya-Belconti, Turkey; Hard $10,000	(Italy) Claudio Fortuna (Italy) Matteo Marfia; 6–1, 6–1	(Italy) Erik Crepaldi (Austria) Maximilian Neuchrist	(France) Jules Marie (United Kingdom) Tom Farquharson	(Italy) Damiano Di Ienno (France) Davy Sum (United Kingdom) Miles Bugby (Germany) Robin Kern
May 13	USA F13 Futures; Tampa, United States; Clay $10,000	(United States) Austin Krajicek; Walkover	(United States) Christian Harrison	(Mexico) Daniel Garza (United States) Chase Buchanan	(Australia) Greg Jones (United States) Bjorn Fratangelo (Latvia) Mārtiņš Podžus (United States) Reid Carleton
May 13	USA F13 Futures; Tampa, United States; Clay $10,000	(United States) Jean-Yves Aubone (United States) Ryan Rowe; 6–3, 5–7, [12–10]	(United States) Chase Buchanan (United States) Reid Carleton	(Mexico) Daniel Garza (United States) Chase Buchanan	(Australia) Greg Jones (United States) Bjorn Fratangelo (Latvia) Mārtiņš Podžus (United States) Reid Carleton
May 13	Venezuela F2 Futures; Maracaibo, Venezuela; Hard $15,000	(Ecuador) Iván Endara; 7–6^{(7–4)}, 4–6, 6–4	(Venezuela) David Souto	(Argentina) Mateo Nicolás Martínez (Dominican Republic) José Hernández	(Argentina) Maximiliano Estévez (Venezuela) Ricardo Rodríguez (Peru) Jorge Brian Panta (Venezuela) Luis David Martínez
May 13	Venezuela F2 Futures; Maracaibo, Venezuela; Hard $15,000	(Venezuela) Luis Fernando Ramírez (Venezuela) David Souto; 7–5, 6–4	(Venezuela) Piero Luisi (Venezuela) Luis David Martínez	(Argentina) Mateo Nicolás Martínez (Dominican Republic) José Hernández	(Argentina) Maximiliano Estévez (Venezuela) Ricardo Rodríguez (Peru) Jorge Brian Panta (Venezuela) Luis David Martínez
May 20	Argentina F7 Futures; Bell Ville, Argentina; Clay $10,000	(Argentina) Pablo Galdón; 7–6^{(7–3)}, 6–4	(Argentina) Andrea Collarini	(Peru) Duilio Beretta (Argentina) Gabriel Alejandro Hidalgo	(Argentina) Mariano Urli (Brazil) Daniel Dutra da Silva (Argentina) Juan Ignacio Londero (Argentina) Facundo Mena
May 20	Argentina F7 Futures; Bell Ville, Argentina; Clay $10,000	(Argentina) Andrea Collarini (Argentina) Guillermo Durán; 6–3, 6–4	(Peru) Duilio Beretta (Peru) Sergio Galdós	(Peru) Duilio Beretta (Argentina) Gabriel Alejandro Hidalgo	(Argentina) Mariano Urli (Brazil) Daniel Dutra da Silva (Argentina) Juan Ignacio Londero (Argentina) Facundo Mena
May 20	Bulgaria F2 Futures; Varna, Bulgaria; Clay $10,000	(Croatia) Kristijan Mesaroš; 5–7, 6–4, 6–2	(Bulgaria) Dimitar Kutrovsky	(Spain) Carlos Gómez-Herrera (Serbia) Saša Stojisavljević	(Bulgaria) Serafim Grozev (Italy) Omar Giacalone (Bulgaria) Dimitar Kuzmanov (France) Laurent Lokoli
May 20	Bulgaria F2 Futures; Varna, Bulgaria; Clay $10,000	(Bulgaria) Alexandar Lazov (Chile) Laslo Urrutia Fuentes; 4–6, 7–5, [10–8]	(Bulgaria) Dinko Halachev (Bulgaria) Petar Trendafilov	(Spain) Carlos Gómez-Herrera (Serbia) Saša Stojisavljević	(Bulgaria) Serafim Grozev (Italy) Omar Giacalone (Bulgaria) Dimitar Kuzmanov (France) Laurent Lokoli
May 20	China F5 Futures; Putian, China; Hard $15,000	(Chinese Taipei) Huang Liang-chi; 7–6^{(7–1)}, 6–3	(China) Wang Chuhan	(United States) Jason Jung (South Korea) Lee Duck-hee	(Australia) Ryan Agar (China) Gao Peng (China) Bai Yan (China) Feng He
May 20	China F5 Futures; Putian, China; Hard $15,000	(China) Gao Peng (China) Gao Wan; 5–2 Ret.	(China) Li Yu Cheng (China) Tao Jun Nan	(United States) Jason Jung (South Korea) Lee Duck-hee	(Australia) Ryan Agar (China) Gao Peng (China) Bai Yan (China) Feng He
May 20	Czech Republic F2 Futures; Teplice, Czech Republic; Clay $10,000	(Slovakia) Norbert Gombos; 6–4, 6–2	(Czech Republic) Jaroslav Pospíšil	(Austria) Dominic Thiem (Czech Republic) Dominik Süč	(Slovakia) Adrian Sikora (Germany) Peter Heller (Czech Republic) Ivo Minář (Austria) Nicolas Reissig
May 20	Czech Republic F2 Futures; Teplice, Czech Republic; Clay $10,000	(Czech Republic) Marek Michalička (Czech Republic) David Pultr; 3–6, 6–3, [10–6]	(Czech Republic) Roman Jebavý (Czech Republic) Jan Šátral	(Austria) Dominic Thiem (Czech Republic) Dominik Süč	(Slovakia) Adrian Sikora (Germany) Peter Heller (Czech Republic) Ivo Minář (Austria) Nicolas Reissig
May 20	Egypt F8 Futures; Sharm El Sheikh, Egypt; Clay $10,000	(Austria) Tristan-Samuel Weissborn; 7–6^{(7–5)}, 6–4	(Egypt) Karim Hossam	(Czech Republic) Jan Blecha (Germany) Kevin Krawietz	(Egypt) Mohamed Safwat (Italy) Marco Crugnola (North Macedonia) Tomislav Jotovski (United Kingdom) Liam Broady
May 20	Egypt F8 Futures; Sharm El Sheikh, Egypt; Clay $10,000	(United Kingdom) Liam Broady (United Kingdom) Joshua Ward-Hibbert; 6–3, 7–5	(Italy) Marco Crugnola (Italy) Riccardo Sinicropi	(Czech Republic) Jan Blecha (Germany) Kevin Krawietz	(Egypt) Mohamed Safwat (Italy) Marco Crugnola (North Macedonia) Tomislav Jotovski (United Kingdom) Liam Broady
May 20	Greece F8 Futures; Marathon-Athens, Greece; Hard $10,000	(United Kingdom) David Rice; 7–5, 4–6, 7–6^{(7–5)}	(United Kingdom) Richard Gabb	(Canada) Filip Peliwo (Australia) Colin Ebelthite	(United Kingdom) Jamie Baker (Greece) Theodoros Angelinos (South Africa) Tucker Vorster (United Kingdom) Josh Goodall
May 20	Greece F8 Futures; Marathon-Athens, Greece; Hard $10,000	(Australia) Colin Ebelthite (Australia) Nick Lindahl; 4–6, 6–2, [10–5]	(United Kingdom) Joseph Gill (United Kingdom) Bruce Strachan	(Canada) Filip Peliwo (Australia) Colin Ebelthite	(United Kingdom) Jamie Baker (Greece) Theodoros Angelinos (South Africa) Tucker Vorster (United Kingdom) Josh Goodall
May 20	Italy F9 Futures; Bergamo, Italy; Clay $10,000	(Italy) Matteo Trevisan; 6–4, 6–4	(Italy) Thomas Fabbiano	(Italy) Andrea Arnaboldi (Italy) Viktor Galović	(Argentina) Andrés Molteni (Switzerland) Michael Lammer (Switzerland) Sandro Ehrat (France) Grégoire Barrère
May 20	Italy F9 Futures; Bergamo, Italy; Clay $10,000	(Chile) Guillermo Hormazábal (Argentina) Andrés Molteni; 6–2, 6–0	(Italy) Matteo Trevisan (Italy) Matteo Volante	(Italy) Andrea Arnaboldi (Italy) Viktor Galović	(Argentina) Andrés Molteni (Switzerland) Michael Lammer (Switzerland) Sandro Ehrat (France) Grégoire Barrère
May 20	Korea F3 Futures; Daegu, Korea; Hard $15,000	(New Zealand) José Statham; 7–5, 3–6, 6–1	(South Korea) Lim Yong-kyu	(Switzerland) Adrien Bossel (Australia) Dane Propoggia	(South Korea) Kim Cheong-eui (Japan) Hiroki Kondo (South Korea) Nam Hyun-woo (South Korea) Nam Ji-sung
May 20	Korea F3 Futures; Daegu, Korea; Hard $15,000	(Australia) Dane Propoggia (New Zealand) José Statham; 6–1, 6–2	(South Korea) Lim Yong-kyu (South Korea) Nam Ji-sung	(Switzerland) Adrien Bossel (Australia) Dane Propoggia	(South Korea) Kim Cheong-eui (Japan) Hiroki Kondo (South Korea) Nam Hyun-woo (South Korea) Nam Ji-sung
May 20	Mexico F9 Futures; Morelia, Mexico; Hard $10,000	(United States) Nicolas Meister; 6–7^{(2–7)}, 6–2, 6–3	(Mexico) Miguel Ángel Reyes-Varela	(Mexico) Miguel Gallardo Valles (Brazil) José Pereira	(United States) Adam El Mihdawy (United States) Connor Farren (Brazil) Pedro Bernardi (United States) Christopher Racz
May 20	Mexico F9 Futures; Morelia, Mexico; Hard $10,000	(Canada) Pavel Krainik (Mexico) Manuel Sánchez; 6–7^{(5–7)}, 6–2, [10–5]	(Mexico) Miguel Gallardo Valles (Mexico) Alan Núñez Aguilera	(Mexico) Miguel Gallardo Valles (Brazil) José Pereira	(United States) Adam El Mihdawy (United States) Connor Farren (Brazil) Pedro Bernardi (United States) Christopher Racz
May 20	Portugal F7 Futures; Coimbra, Portugal; Hard $10,000	(Portugal) João Domingues; 7–6^{(7–4)}, 6–3	(United Kingdom) Neil Pauffley	(Portugal) Leonardo Tavares (France) Mathieu Rodrigues	(Italy) Erik Crepaldi (France) Rudy Coco (Portugal) Andre Gaspar Murta (Portugal) Ricardo Jorge
May 20	Portugal F7 Futures; Coimbra, Portugal; Hard $10,000	(Portugal) Gonçalo Falcão (Portugal) Frederico Gil; 7–6^{(7–4)}, 7–6^{(9–7)}	(Spain) Carlos Boluda-Purkiss (Spain) Roberto Ortega Olmedo	(Portugal) Leonardo Tavares (France) Mathieu Rodrigues	(Italy) Erik Crepaldi (France) Rudy Coco (Portugal) Andre Gaspar Murta (Portugal) Ricardo Jorge
May 20	Romania F2 Futures; Bucharest, Romania; Clay $10,000	(Austria) Michael Linzer; 6–4, 6–0	(Romania) Petru-Alexandru Luncanu	(Belgium) Germain Gigounon (Poland) Piotr Gadomski	(Serbia) Nikola Ćaćić (Moldova) Maxim Dubarenco (Monaco) Benjamin Balleret (Belgium) Yannik Reuter
May 20	Romania F2 Futures; Bucharest, Romania; Clay $10,000	(Germany) Gero Kretschmer (Germany) Alex Satschko; 6–4, 6–4	(Belgium) Germain Gigounon (Belgium) Yannik Reuter	(Belgium) Germain Gigounon (Poland) Piotr Gadomski	(Serbia) Nikola Ćaćić (Moldova) Maxim Dubarenco (Monaco) Benjamin Balleret (Belgium) Yannik Reuter
May 20	Russia F7 Futures; Kazan, Russia; Clay $15,000	(Russia) Aslan Karatsev; 6–4, 6–4	(Ukraine) Artem Smirnov	(Russia) Victor Baluda (Russia) Aleksandr Lobkov	(Russia) Anton Galkin (Belarus) Siarhei Betau (Russia) Valery Rudnev (Belarus) Egor Gerasimov
May 20	Russia F7 Futures; Kazan, Russia; Clay $15,000	(Ukraine) Artem Smirnov (Ukraine) Volodymyr Uzhylovskyi; 7–6^{(7–5)}, 6–2	(Russia) Aleksandr Lobkov (Russia) Dmitry Marfinsky	(Russia) Victor Baluda (Russia) Aleksandr Lobkov	(Russia) Anton Galkin (Belarus) Siarhei Betau (Russia) Valery Rudnev (Belarus) Egor Gerasimov
May 20	Spain F11 Futures; Vic, Spain; Clay $10,000	(Spain) José Checa Calvo; 3–6, 6–4, 6–0	(Spain) Gerard Granollers Pujol	(Australia) Jordan Thompson (New Zealand) Artem Sitak	(Spain) Eduard Esteve Lobato (Spain) Miguel Ángel López Jaén (Spain) Oriol Roca Batalla (Argentina) Leonel Videla
May 20	Spain F11 Futures; Vic, Spain; Clay $10,000	(Spain) Miguel Ángel López Jaén (Spain) Jordi Marse-Vidri; 7–6^{(9–7)}, 6–3	(Spain) Oriol Roca Batalla (Netherlands) Mark Vervoort	(Australia) Jordan Thompson (New Zealand) Artem Sitak	(Spain) Eduard Esteve Lobato (Spain) Miguel Ángel López Jaén (Spain) Oriol Roca Batalla (Argentina) Leonel Videla
May 20	Thailand F1 Futures; Bangkok, Thailand; Hard $10,000	(Australia) Benjamin Mitchell; 6–3, 1–6, 7–6^{(7–2)}	(India) Karunuday Singh	(Australia) Adam Feeney (Thailand) Pruchya Isaro	(Slovakia) Dominik Hrbatý (Japan) Takuto Niki (Australia) Jacob Grills (Japan) Sho Katayama
May 20	Thailand F1 Futures; Bangkok, Thailand; Hard $10,000	(Thailand) Sanchai Ratiwatana (Thailand) Sonchat Ratiwatana; 6–7^{(6–8)}, 6–2, [10–7]	(Japan) Takuto Niki (Japan) Arata Onozawa	(Australia) Adam Feeney (Thailand) Pruchya Isaro	(Slovakia) Dominik Hrbatý (Japan) Takuto Niki (Australia) Jacob Grills (Japan) Sho Katayama
May 20	Turkey F20 Futures; Antalya-Belconti, Turkey; Hard $10,000	(Croatia) Mate Delić; 3–6, 7–5, 6–4	(France) Hugo Nys	(Brazil) Alex Blumenberg (France) Davy Sum	(Switzerland) Yann Marti (United Kingdom) Jack Carpenter (Italy) Claudio Fortuna (Austria) Bastian Trinker
May 20	Turkey F20 Futures; Antalya-Belconti, Turkey; Hard $10,000	(France) Hugo Nys (France) Davy Sum; 6–2, 6–0	(Italy) Claudio Fortuna (Italy) Matthieu Vierin	(Brazil) Alex Blumenberg (France) Davy Sum	(Switzerland) Yann Marti (United Kingdom) Jack Carpenter (Italy) Claudio Fortuna (Austria) Bastian Trinker
May 27	Argentina F8 Futures; Arroyito, Argentina; Clay $10,000	(Argentina) Federico Coria; 6–3, 6–2	(Brazil) Thales Turini	(Switzerland) Joss Espasandin (Argentina) Juan Ignacio Galarza	(Argentina) Facundo Mena (Argentina) Gabriel Alejandro Hidalgo (Argentina) Pablo Galdón (Chile) Ricardo Urzúa-Rivera
May 27	Argentina F8 Futures; Arroyito, Argentina; Clay $10,000	(Peru) Duilio Beretta (Peru) Sergio Galdós; 6–0, 7–5	(Brazil) Daniel Dutra da Silva (Argentina) Pablo Galdón	(Switzerland) Joss Espasandin (Argentina) Juan Ignacio Galarza	(Argentina) Facundo Mena (Argentina) Gabriel Alejandro Hidalgo (Argentina) Pablo Galdón (Chile) Ricardo Urzúa-Rivera
May 27	Bosnia & Herzegovina F1 Futures; Prijedor, Bosnia & Herzegovina; Clay $10,000	(Bosnia and Herzegovina) Aldin Šetkić; 7–6^{(7–4)}, 6–0	(Serbia) Peđa Krstin	(Serbia) Denis Bejtulahi (Bosnia and Herzegovina) Nerman Fatić	(Australia) Gavin van Peperzeel (Serbia) Milan Krnjetin (Serbia) Luka Ilić (Serbia) Danilo Petrović
May 27	Bosnia & Herzegovina F1 Futures; Prijedor, Bosnia & Herzegovina; Clay $10,000	The doubles event has been cancelled after the Quarterfinals.		(Serbia) Denis Bejtulahi (Bosnia and Herzegovina) Nerman Fatić	(Australia) Gavin van Peperzeel (Serbia) Milan Krnjetin (Serbia) Luka Ilić (Serbia) Danilo Petrović
May 27	Bulgaria F3 Futures; Sofia, Bulgaria; Clay $10,000	(Belgium) Germain Gigounon; 2–6, 7–5, 7–6^{(8–6)}	(Poland) Grzegorz Panfil	(Bulgaria) Tihomir Grozdanov (Bulgaria) Petar Trendafilov	(Poland) Andriej Kapaś (Bulgaria) Alexandar Lazov (Croatia) Kristijan Mesaroš (Czech Republic) Ondřej Vaculík
May 27	Bulgaria F3 Futures; Sofia, Bulgaria; Clay $10,000	(Poland) Andriej Kapaś (Poland) Grzegorz Panfil; 6–1, 6–4	(Bulgaria) Dinko Halachev (Bulgaria) Petar Trendafilov	(Bulgaria) Tihomir Grozdanov (Bulgaria) Petar Trendafilov	(Poland) Andriej Kapaś (Bulgaria) Alexandar Lazov (Croatia) Kristijan Mesaroš (Czech Republic) Ondřej Vaculík
May 27	Czech Republic F3 Futures; Jablonec nad Nisou, Czech Republic; Clay $10,000	(Czech Republic) Jan Mertl; 6–4, 7–5	(Czech Republic) Jan Hernych	(Chile) Hans Podlipnik Castillo (Czech Republic) Dušan Lojda	(Czech Republic) Marek Michalička (Czech Republic) Jakub Lustyk (Slovakia) Norbert Gombos (Czech Republic) Jan Kunčík
May 27	Czech Republic F3 Futures; Jablonec nad Nisou, Czech Republic; Clay $10,000	(Czech Republic) Lukáš Maršoun (Czech Republic) Dominik Süč; 6–1, 6–0	(Czech Republic) Filip Brtnický (Czech Republic) Jakub Filipský	(Chile) Hans Podlipnik Castillo (Czech Republic) Dušan Lojda	(Czech Republic) Marek Michalička (Czech Republic) Jakub Lustyk (Slovakia) Norbert Gombos (Czech Republic) Jan Kunčík
May 27	Egypt F9 Futures; Sharm El Sheikh, Egypt; Clay $10,000	(Egypt) Karim Hossam; 6–4, 7–5	(Egypt) Mohamed Safwat	(United Kingdom) Andrew Fitzpatrick (Austria) Christian Trubrig	(Switzerland) Alexander Ritschard (Austria) Tristan-Samuel Weissborn (Italy) Riccardo Sinicropi (Russia) Ivan Nedelko
May 27	Egypt F9 Futures; Sharm El Sheikh, Egypt; Clay $10,000	(Belgium) Joris De Loore (Belgium) Jeroen Vanneste; 6–2, 6–2	(United Kingdom) Liam Broady (United Kingdom) Joshua Ward-Hibbert	(United Kingdom) Andrew Fitzpatrick (Austria) Christian Trubrig	(Switzerland) Alexander Ritschard (Austria) Tristan-Samuel Weissborn (Italy) Riccardo Sinicropi (Russia) Ivan Nedelko
May 27	Greece F9 Futures; Thessaloniki, Greece; Clay $10,000	(Spain) Carlos Gómez-Herrera; 4–6, 6–2, 6–2	(Greece) Theodoros Angelinos	(Italy) Alessandro Bega (Greece) Alexandros Jakupovic	(Australia) Colin Ebelthite (Greece) Konstantinos Mikos (Greece) Konstantinos Economidis (Barbados) Darian King
May 27	Greece F9 Futures; Thessaloniki, Greece; Clay $10,000	(Greece) Konstantinos Economidis (Greece) Alexandros Jakupovic; 6–1, 6–2	(Barbados) Darian King (Germany) Dominik Schulz	(Italy) Alessandro Bega (Greece) Alexandros Jakupovic	(Australia) Colin Ebelthite (Greece) Konstantinos Mikos (Greece) Konstantinos Economidis (Barbados) Darian King
May 27	India F6 Futures; Chennai, India; Hard $10,000	(India) Prajnesh Gunneswaran; 7–6^{(7–5)}, 6–3	(India) Vijayant Malik	(India) N. Sriram Balaji (India) Karunuday Singh	(Japan) Bumpei Sato (India) Garvit Batra (Japan) Toshihide Matsui (India) Jeevan Nedunchezhiyan
May 27	India F6 Futures; Chennai, India; Hard $10,000	(India) N. Sriram Balaji (India) Jeevan Nedunchezhiyan; 6–1, 6–4	(Japan) Toshihide Matsui (Japan) Bumpei Sato	(India) N. Sriram Balaji (India) Karunuday Singh	(Japan) Bumpei Sato (India) Garvit Batra (Japan) Toshihide Matsui (India) Jeevan Nedunchezhiyan
May 27	Italy F10 Futures; Cesena, Italy; Clay $15,000+H	(Argentina) Guido Andreozzi; 6–4, 6–4	(Italy) Andrea Arnaboldi	(Spain) Guillermo Olaso (Chile) Cristian Garín	(Italy) Federico Gaio (Argentina) Facundo Bagnis (Italy) Matteo Trevisan (Italy) Gianluca Naso
May 27	Italy F10 Futures; Cesena, Italy; Clay $15,000+H	(Argentina) Guido Andreozzi (Argentina) Agustín Velotti; 6–4, 6–1	(Netherlands) Sander Groen (Sweden) Andreas Vinciguerra	(Spain) Guillermo Olaso (Chile) Cristian Garín	(Italy) Federico Gaio (Argentina) Facundo Bagnis (Italy) Matteo Trevisan (Italy) Gianluca Naso
May 27	Korea F4 Futures; Changwon, Korea; Hard $15,000	(South Korea) Lim Yong-kyu; 7–5, 6–3	(Japan) Shuichi Sekiguchi	(Australia) Dane Propoggia (South Korea) Nam Ji-sung	(Spain) Enrique López Pérez (South Korea) Kim Cheong-eui (Lithuania) Laurynas Grigelis (South Korea) Nam Hyun-woo
May 27	Korea F4 Futures; Changwon, Korea; Hard $15,000	(South Korea) Lim Yong-kyu (South Korea) Nam Ji-sung; 5–7, 6–4, [11–9]	(Lithuania) Laurynas Grigelis (Spain) Enrique López Pérez	(Australia) Dane Propoggia (South Korea) Nam Ji-sung	(Spain) Enrique López Pérez (South Korea) Kim Cheong-eui (Lithuania) Laurynas Grigelis (South Korea) Nam Hyun-woo
May 27	Mexico F10 Futures; Quintana Roo, Mexico; Hard $10,000	(Brazil) Bruno Sant'Anna; 6–1, 6–2	(Guatemala) Christopher Díaz Figueroa	(Colombia) Michael Quintero (Venezuela) Luis David Martínez	(United States) Austin Krajicek (Mexico) Miguel Gallardo Valles (Dominican Republic) José Hernández (Brazil) José Pereira
May 27	Mexico F10 Futures; Quintana Roo, Mexico; Hard $10,000	(Venezuela) Luis David Martínez (Venezuela) David Souto; 6–4, 4–6, [10–6]	(United States) Jean-Yves Aubone (United States) Austin Krajicek	(Colombia) Michael Quintero (Venezuela) Luis David Martínez	(United States) Austin Krajicek (Mexico) Miguel Gallardo Valles (Dominican Republic) José Hernández (Brazil) José Pereira
May 27	Morocco F1 Futures; Casablanca, Morocco; Clay $10,000	(Italy) Gianluigi Quinzi; 7–6^{(7–2)}, 1–6, 6–4	(Algeria) Lamine Ouahab	(Czech Republic) Michal Schmid (Sweden) Christian Lindell	(Spain) Sergio Gutiérrez Ferrol (France) Florian Reynet (Sweden) Markus Eriksson (France) Grégoire Burquier
May 27	Morocco F1 Futures; Casablanca, Morocco; Clay $10,000	(Algeria) Lamine Ouahab (Morocco) Younès Rachidi; 6–3, 6–2	(Sweden) Markus Eriksson (Sweden) Milos Sekulic	(Czech Republic) Michal Schmid (Sweden) Christian Lindell	(Spain) Sergio Gutiérrez Ferrol (France) Florian Reynet (Sweden) Markus Eriksson (France) Grégoire Burquier
May 27	Portugal F8 Futures; Guimarães, Portugal; Hard $10,000	(France) Jules Marie; 6–3, 2–6, 6–3	(Italy) Riccardo Ghedin	(France) Élie Rousset (Spain) Ricardo Ojeda Lara	(Republic of Ireland) Daniel Glancy (Spain) Samuel Ribeiro Navarrete (Spain) José Anton Salazar Martín (France) Rudy Coco
May 27	Portugal F8 Futures; Guimarães, Portugal; Hard $10,000	(Spain) Carlos Boluda-Purkiss (Spain) Roberto Ortega Olmedo; 6–2, 6–3	(Italy) Riccardo Ghedin (Republic of Ireland) Daniel Glancy	(France) Élie Rousset (Spain) Ricardo Ojeda Lara	(Republic of Ireland) Daniel Glancy (Spain) Samuel Ribeiro Navarrete (Spain) José Anton Salazar Martín (France) Rudy Coco
May 27	Romania F3 Futures; Bacău, Romania; Clay $15,000+H	(Spain) Jordi Samper Montaña; 6–4, 6–3	(Spain) Gerard Granollers Pujol	(Brazil) Leonardo Kirche (Moldova) Maxim Dubarenco	(Italy) Matteo Fago (Belgium) Yannick Mertens (Germany) Nils Langer (United States) Bradley Klahn
May 27	Romania F3 Futures; Bacău, Romania; Clay $15,000+H	(United States) Bradley Klahn (New Zealand) Michael Venus; 7–6^{(7–4)}, 6–7^{(4–7)}, [14–12]	(Poland) Piotr Gadomski (France) Tristan Lamasine	(Brazil) Leonardo Kirche (Moldova) Maxim Dubarenco	(Italy) Matteo Fago (Belgium) Yannick Mertens (Germany) Nils Langer (United States) Bradley Klahn
May 27	Russia F8 Futures; Moscow, Russia; Clay $15,000	(Russia) Aslan Karatsev; 4–6, 6–2, 6–2	(Russia) Victor Baluda	(Russia) Konstantin Kravchuk (Canada) Steven Diez	(Estonia) Vladimir Ivanov (Russia) Denis Matsukevich (Georgia (country)) Nikoloz Basilashvili (Belarus) Siarhei Betau
May 27	Russia F8 Futures; Moscow, Russia; Clay $15,000	(Belarus) Aliaksandr Bury (Ukraine) Volodymyr Uzhylovskyi; 6–0, 6–1	(Canada) Steven Diez (Russia) Vladislav Dubinsky	(Russia) Konstantin Kravchuk (Canada) Steven Diez	(Estonia) Vladimir Ivanov (Russia) Denis Matsukevich (Georgia (country)) Nikoloz Basilashvili (Belarus) Siarhei Betau
May 27	Slovenia F1 Futures; Bled, Slovenia; Clay $10,000	(Italy) Riccardo Bellotti; 6–3, 6–2	(Slovenia) Tom Kočevar-Dešman	(Austria) Gerald Melzer (Italy) Roberto Marcora	(Austria) Bastian Trinker (Germany) Peter Heller (Italy) Marco Bortolotti (Austria) Patrick Ofner
May 27	Slovenia F1 Futures; Bled, Slovenia; Clay $10,000	(Germany) Peter Heller (Austria) Bastian Trinker; 6–0, 7–6^{(10–8)}	(Austria) Sebastian Bader (United States) Erik Elliott	(Austria) Gerald Melzer (Italy) Roberto Marcora	(Austria) Bastian Trinker (Germany) Peter Heller (Italy) Marco Bortolotti (Austria) Patrick Ofner
May 27	Spain F15 Futures; Madrid, Spain; Clay $10,000	(Germany) Richard Becker; 6–3, 6–2	(United Kingdom) Oliver Golding	(Spain) Pol Toledo Bagué (Spain) Marcos Giraldi Requena	(Spain) José Checa Calvo (Spain) Miguel Ángel López Jaén (Spain) Edualdo Bonet-de Gispert (France) Laurent Rochette
May 27	Spain F15 Futures; Madrid, Spain; Clay $10,000	(United Kingdom) Oliver Golding (United Kingdom) Alexander Ward; 6–3, 2–6, [10–5]	(Germany) Richard Becker (Italy) Lorenzo Giustino	(Spain) Pol Toledo Bagué (Spain) Marcos Giraldi Requena	(Spain) José Checa Calvo (Spain) Miguel Ángel López Jaén (Spain) Edualdo Bonet-de Gispert (France) Laurent Rochette
May 27	Thailand F2 Futures; Bangkok, Thailand; Hard $10,000	(India) Saketh Myneni; 7–6^{(7–4)}, 6–1	(Australia) Andrew Harris	(United States) Tyler Hochwalt (Australia) Jacob Grills	(Thailand) Danai Udomchoke (Australia) Aaron Leeder-Chard (Japan) Yuichi Ito (Japan) Takuto Niki
May 27	Thailand F2 Futures; Bangkok, Thailand; Hard $10,000	(Australia) Ryan Agar (Australia) Adam Feeney; 2–6, 6–2, [10–2]	(Indonesia) Elbert Sie (Indonesia) David Agung Susanto	(United States) Tyler Hochwalt (Australia) Jacob Grills	(Thailand) Danai Udomchoke (Australia) Aaron Leeder-Chard (Japan) Yuichi Ito (Japan) Takuto Niki
May 27	Turkey F21 Futures; Mersin, Turkey; Clay $10,000	(Turkey) Marsel İlhan; 7–6^{(7–5)}, 3–6, 6–4	(Austria) Michael Linzer	(Austria) Peter Goldsteiner (Italy) Claudio Fortuna	(Italy) Francesco Picco (Serbia) Miki Janković (Russia) Andrei Plotniy (Argentina) Maximiliano Estévez
May 27	Turkey F21 Futures; Mersin, Turkey; Clay $10,000	(Italy) Francesco Picco (Netherlands) Mark Vervoort; 6–4, 6–1	(Brazil) Alex Blumenberg (Russia) Andrei Plotniy	(Austria) Peter Goldsteiner (Italy) Claudio Fortuna	(Italy) Francesco Picco (Serbia) Miki Janković (Russia) Andrei Plotniy (Argentina) Maximiliano Estévez

=== June ===
Week of	Tournament	Winner	Runners-up	Semifinalists	Quarterfinalists
June 3	Argentina F9 Futures; Córdoba, Argentina; Clay $10,000	(Argentina) Andrea Collarini; 6–1, 6–4	(Argentina) Patricio Heras	(Argentina) Tomás Lipovšek Puches (Argentina) Juan Pablo Paz	(Argentina) Guillermo Durán (Chile) Ricardo Urzúa-Rivera (Argentina) Juan Ignacio Galarza (Brazil) Rafael Camilo
June 3	Argentina F9 Futures; Córdoba, Argentina; Clay $10,000	(Brazil) Daniel Dutra da Silva (Brazil) Pedro Sakamoto; 6–3, 7–6^{(7–4)}	(Argentina) Andrea Collarini (Argentina) Mateo Nicolás Martínez	(Argentina) Tomás Lipovšek Puches (Argentina) Juan Pablo Paz	(Argentina) Guillermo Durán (Chile) Ricardo Urzúa-Rivera (Argentina) Juan Ignacio Galarza (Brazil) Rafael Camilo
June 3	Bosnia & Herzegovina F2 Futures; Brčko, Bosnia & Herzegovina; Clay $10,000	(Croatia) Kristijan Mesaroš; 6–2, 6–2	(Serbia) Miki Janković	(Czech Republic) Roman Jebavý (Poland) Błażej Koniusz	(Serbia) Peđa Krstin (Croatia) Duje Kekez (Serbia) Luka Ilić (Czech Republic) Libor Salaba
June 3	Bosnia & Herzegovina F2 Futures; Brčko, Bosnia & Herzegovina; Clay $10,000	(Czech Republic) Roman Jebavý (Czech Republic) Libor Salaba; 6–2, 6–4	(Croatia) Duje Delić (Croatia) Antun Pehar	(Czech Republic) Roman Jebavý (Poland) Błażej Koniusz	(Serbia) Peđa Krstin (Croatia) Duje Kekez (Serbia) Luka Ilić (Czech Republic) Libor Salaba
June 3	Egypt F10 Futures; Sharm El Sheikh, Egypt; Clay $10,000	(Egypt) Mohamed Safwat; 6–2, 6–7^{(3–7)}, 6–3	(Austria) Marc Rath	(Belgium) Joris De Loore (Brazil) André Miele	(Poland) Paweł Ciaś (Austria) Tristan-Samuel Weissborn (Egypt) Sherif Sabry (Austria) Thomas Statzberger
June 3	Egypt F10 Futures; Sharm El Sheikh, Egypt; Clay $10,000	(Belgium) Joris De Loore (Belgium) Jeroen Vanneste; 6–4, 6–4	(Brazil) André Miele (Brazil) João Pedro Sorgi	(Belgium) Joris De Loore (Brazil) André Miele	(Poland) Paweł Ciaś (Austria) Tristan-Samuel Weissborn (Egypt) Sherif Sabry (Austria) Thomas Statzberger
June 3	Guam F1 Futures; Tumon, Guam; Hard $10,000	(India) Saketh Myneni; 6–0, 6–1	(Japan) Masato Shiga	(Japan) Takuto Niki (Japan) Yuichi Ito	(Japan) Gengo Kikuchi (Japan) Bumpei Sato (South Korea) Jun Woong-sun (Japan) Yasutaka Uchiyama
June 3	Guam F1 Futures; Tumon, Guam; Hard $10,000	(Japan) Bumpei Sato (Japan) Yasutaka Uchiyama; 7–6^{(7–2)}, 6–4	(Japan) Yuichi Ito (Japan) Takuto Niki	(Japan) Takuto Niki (Japan) Yuichi Ito	(Japan) Gengo Kikuchi (Japan) Bumpei Sato (South Korea) Jun Woong-sun (Japan) Yasutaka Uchiyama
June 3	India F7 Futures; Chennai, India; Hard $10,000	(India) N. Sriram Balaji; 6–7^{(6–8)}, 6–4, 6–0	(India) Jeevan Nedunchezhiyan	(India) Prajnesh Gunneswaran (India) Karunuday Singh	(India) Fariz Mohammed (Japan) Toshihide Matsui (India) Vijayant Malik (India) Vinayak Sharma Kaza
June 3	India F7 Futures; Chennai, India; Hard $10,000	(India) N. Sriram Balaji (India) Jeevan Nedunchezhiyan; 6–2, 6–7^{(6–8)}, [10–5]	(South Africa) Keith-Patrick Crowley (India) Arun-Prakash Rajagopalan	(India) Prajnesh Gunneswaran (India) Karunuday Singh	(India) Fariz Mohammed (Japan) Toshihide Matsui (India) Vijayant Malik (India) Vinayak Sharma Kaza
June 3	Israel F10 Futures; Herzlia, Israel; Hard $10,000	(France) Antoine Benneteau; 6–2, 6–2	(Israel) Igor Smilansky	(United Kingdom) Ashley Hewitt (Israel) Bar Tzuf Botzer	(Chile) Matías Sborowitz (Israel) Tal Goldengoren (Israel) Gilad Ben Zvi (Israel) Or Ram-Harel
June 3	Israel F10 Futures; Herzlia, Israel; Hard $10,000	(France) Albano Olivetti (France) Élie Rousset; 6–3, 7–6^{(8–6)}	(France) Antoine Benneteau (South Africa) Dean O'Brien	(United Kingdom) Ashley Hewitt (Israel) Bar Tzuf Botzer	(Chile) Matías Sborowitz (Israel) Tal Goldengoren (Israel) Gilad Ben Zvi (Israel) Or Ram-Harel
June 3	Italy F11 Futures; Parma, Italy; Clay $15,000	(Italy) Riccardo Bellotti; 6–2, 6–2	(Italy) Thomas Fabbiano	(Monaco) Benjamin Balleret (Italy) Daniele Giorgini	(France) Julien Obry (Italy) Amerigo Contini (Italy) Erik Crepaldi (Argentina) Leandro Migani
June 3	Italy F11 Futures; Parma, Italy; Clay $15,000	(Chile) Guillermo Hormazábal (Argentina) Leandro Migani; 6–4, 6–7^{(7–9)}, [10–4]	(Colombia) Cristian Rodríguez (Colombia) Óscar Rodríguez	(Monaco) Benjamin Balleret (Italy) Daniele Giorgini	(France) Julien Obry (Italy) Amerigo Contini (Italy) Erik Crepaldi (Argentina) Leandro Migani
June 3	Korea F5 Futures; Gyeongsan, Korea; Hard $15,000	(Australia) Benjamin Mitchell; 7–6^{(7–4)}, 7–6^{(7–3)}	(Japan) Hiroki Kondo	(South Korea) Kim Cheong-eui (South Korea) Na Jung-woong	(South Korea) Nam Ji-sung (South Korea) Lim Yong-kyu (Japan) Shuichi Sekiguchi (Australia) Luke Saville
June 3	Korea F5 Futures; Gyeongsan, Korea; Hard $15,000	(South Korea) Chung Hong (South Korea) Noh Sang-woo; 6–3, 0–6, [10–6]	(Japan) Hiroki Kondo (Spain) Enrique López Pérez	(South Korea) Kim Cheong-eui (South Korea) Na Jung-woong	(South Korea) Nam Ji-sung (South Korea) Lim Yong-kyu (Japan) Shuichi Sekiguchi (Australia) Luke Saville
June 3	Mexico F11 Futures; Quintana Roo, Mexico; Hard $10,000	(Venezuela) David Souto; 6–4, 6–2	(Peru) Mauricio Echazú	(Brazil) Bruno Sant'Anna (Venezuela) Luis David Martínez	(Burundi) Hassan Ndayishimiye (Dominican Republic) José Hernández (Germany) Yannick Hanfmann (Germany) Jonas Lütjen
June 3	Mexico F11 Futures; Quintana Roo, Mexico; Hard $10,000	(Mexico) Mauricio Astorga (Mexico) Eduardo Peralta-Tello; 6–2, 6–1	(Brazil) Guilherme Hadlich (Colombia) Felipe Mantilla	(Brazil) Bruno Sant'Anna (Venezuela) Luis David Martínez	(Burundi) Hassan Ndayishimiye (Dominican Republic) José Hernández (Germany) Yannick Hanfmann (Germany) Jonas Lütjen
June 3	Morocco F2 Futures; Casablanca, Morocco; Clay $10,000	(Algeria) Lamine Ouahab; 6–3, 6–4	(France) Alexis Musialek	(France) Tak Khunn Wang (Sweden) Markus Eriksson	(Morocco) Younès Rachidi (France) Martin Vaïsse (France) Maxime Chazal (Sweden) Christian Lindell
June 3	Morocco F2 Futures; Casablanca, Morocco; Clay $10,000	(Sweden) Isak Arvidsson (Finland) Micke Kontinen; 7–5, 3–6, [10–7]	(Sweden) Markus Eriksson (Sweden) Milos Sekulic	(France) Tak Khunn Wang (Sweden) Markus Eriksson	(Morocco) Younès Rachidi (France) Martin Vaïsse (France) Maxime Chazal (Sweden) Christian Lindell
June 3	Slovenia F2 Futures; Maribor, Slovenia; Clay $10,000	(Austria) Nicolas Reissig; 6–4, 6–4	(Moldova) Maxim Dubarenco	(Austria) Bastian Trinker (Austria) Pascal Brunner	(France) Axel Michon (Austria) Lukas Jastraunig (Slovenia) Tomislav Ternar (Germany) Jeremy Jahn
June 3	Slovenia F2 Futures; Maribor, Slovenia; Clay $10,000	(Austria) Lukas Jastraunig (Austria) Nicolas Reissig; 3–6, 7–6^{(7–5)}, [11–9]	(Croatia) Ante Pavić (Slovenia) Janez Semrajc	(Austria) Bastian Trinker (Austria) Pascal Brunner	(France) Axel Michon (Austria) Lukas Jastraunig (Slovenia) Tomislav Ternar (Germany) Jeremy Jahn
June 3	Spain F16 Futures; Santa Margarida de Montbui, Spain; Hard $10,000	(Canada) Steven Diez; 6–1, 6–2	(Spain) José Checa Calvo	(Spain) Marcos Giraldi Requena (Australia) Andrew Whittington	(Spain) Carlos Boluda-Purkiss (Spain) Oriol Roca Batalla (Italy) Alessandro Petrone (Spain) Pol Toledo Bagué
June 3	Spain F16 Futures; Santa Margarida de Montbui, Spain; Hard $10,000	(Spain) Oriol Roca Batalla (Netherlands) Mark Vervoort; 3–6, 6–3, [10–6]	(Spain) Miguel Ángel López Jaén (Spain) Jordi Marse-Vidri	(Spain) Marcos Giraldi Requena (Australia) Andrew Whittington	(Spain) Carlos Boluda-Purkiss (Spain) Oriol Roca Batalla (Italy) Alessandro Petrone (Spain) Pol Toledo Bagué
June 3	Thailand F3 Futures; Bangkok, Thailand; Hard $10,000	(Australia) Adam Feeney; 6–4, 6–1	(Thailand) Pruchya Isaro	(Japan) Sho Katayama (Australia) Andrew Harris	(Thailand) Thanasit Issaraporn (Thailand) Chayanon Kaewsuto (Japan) Arata Onozawa (United States) Tyler Hochwalt
June 3	Thailand F3 Futures; Bangkok, Thailand; Hard $10,000	(Australia) Ryan Agar (Australia) Adam Feeney; 7–5, 7–6^{(7–4)}	(Japan) Sho Katayama (Japan) Arata Onozawa	(Japan) Sho Katayama (Australia) Andrew Harris	(Thailand) Thanasit Issaraporn (Thailand) Chayanon Kaewsuto (Japan) Arata Onozawa (United States) Tyler Hochwalt
June 3	Turkey F22 Futures; Konya, Turkey; Hard $10,000	(Argentina) Maximiliano Estévez; 7–6^{(7–2)}, 6–2	(Italy) Alessandro Bega	(United States) Sean Berman (South Africa) Tucker Vorster	(Tunisia) Mohamed Haythem Abid (Republic of Ireland) Daniel Glancy (France) Romain Sichez (South Africa) Nikala Scholtz
June 3	Turkey F22 Futures; Konya, Turkey; Hard $10,000	(South Africa) Nikala Scholtz (South Africa) Tucker Vorster; 6–0, 6–4	(Turkey) Abdullah Yılmaz (Turkey) Anıl Yüksel	(United States) Sean Berman (South Africa) Tucker Vorster	(Tunisia) Mohamed Haythem Abid (Republic of Ireland) Daniel Glancy (France) Romain Sichez (South Africa) Nikala Scholtz
June 3	USA F14 Futures; Innisbrook, United States; Clay $10,000	(El Salvador) Marcelo Arévalo; 6–3, 7–6^{(7–5)}	(Brazil) Fernando Romboli	(France) Gianni Mina (Romania) Cătălin-Ionuț Gârd	(United States) Mitchell Frank (United States) Jeff Dadamo (United States) Jesse Witten (United States) Alexandru Gozun
June 3	USA F14 Futures; Innisbrook, United States; Clay $10,000	(El Salvador) Marcelo Arévalo (Venezuela) Roberto Maytín; 3–6, 6–4, [10–7]	(United States) Sekou Bangoura (United States) Eric Quigley	(France) Gianni Mina (Romania) Cătălin-Ionuț Gârd	(United States) Mitchell Frank (United States) Jeff Dadamo (United States) Jesse Witten (United States) Alexandru Gozun
June 10	Bosnia & Herzegovina F3 Futures; Doboj, Bosnia & Herzegovina; Clay $10,000	(Croatia) Joško Topić; 6–4, 6–2	(Croatia) Duje Kekez	(Czech Republic) Roman Jebavý (France) Maxime Forcin	(Serbia) Peđa Krstin (Croatia) Kristijan Mesaroš (Slovenia) Tomislav Ternar (Czech Republic) Michal Schmid
June 10	Bosnia & Herzegovina F3 Futures; Doboj, Bosnia & Herzegovina; Clay $10,000	(Bosnia and Herzegovina) Tomislav Brkić (Croatia) Duje Kekez; 6–3, 6–4	(Bosnia and Herzegovina) Nerman Fatić (Bosnia and Herzegovina) Ismar Gorčić	(Czech Republic) Roman Jebavý (France) Maxime Forcin	(Serbia) Peđa Krstin (Croatia) Kristijan Mesaroš (Slovenia) Tomislav Ternar (Czech Republic) Michal Schmid
June 10	Egypt F11 Futures; Sharm El Sheikh, Egypt; Clay $10,000	(Austria) Marc Rath; 5–0 Ret.	(Belgium) Jeroen Vanneste	(Belgium) Joris De Loore (Brazil) André Miele	(Russia) Aslan Karatsev (Egypt) Karim-Mohamed Maamoun (Egypt) Karim Hossam (Poland) Mikołaj Jędruszczak
June 10	Egypt F11 Futures; Sharm El Sheikh, Egypt; Clay $10,000	(Brazil) André Miele (Brazil) João Pedro Sorgi; 6–3, 6–3	(Russia) Evgeny Elistratov (Russia) Andrey Saveliev	(Belgium) Joris De Loore (Brazil) André Miele	(Russia) Aslan Karatsev (Egypt) Karim-Mohamed Maamoun (Egypt) Karim Hossam (Poland) Mikołaj Jędruszczak
June 10	Germany F5 Futures; Essen, Germany; Clay $15,000	(Germany) Tim Pütz; 6–2, 7–5	(Germany) Steven Moneke	(Belgium) Yannick Mertens (France) Franck Pepe	(Poland) Andriej Kapaś (Germany) Alexander Zverev (Germany) Tom Schönenberg (Russia) Alexey Vatutin
June 10	Germany F5 Futures; Essen, Germany; Clay $15,000	(Germany) Nils Langer (Germany) Daniel Masur; 6–3, 6–4	(Poland) Andriej Kapaś (Poland) Grzegorz Panfil	(Belgium) Yannick Mertens (France) Franck Pepe	(Poland) Andriej Kapaś (Germany) Alexander Zverev (Germany) Tom Schönenberg (Russia) Alexey Vatutin
June 10	India F8 Futures; Coimbatore, India; Hard $10,000	(India) Jeevan Nedunchezhiyan; 6–2, 5–1, retired	(India) Vijayant Malik	(India) N. Sriram Balaji (India) Karunuday Singh	(Chinese Taipei) Hung Jui-chen (India) Vignesh Peranamallur (South Africa) Keith-Patrick Crowley (India) Abdullah Shaikh
June 10	India F8 Futures; Coimbatore, India; Hard $10,000	(South Africa) Keith-Patrick Crowley (India) Arun-Prakash Rajagopalan; 6–3, 6–2	(India) Fariz Mohammed (India) Vignesh Peranamallur	(India) N. Sriram Balaji (India) Karunuday Singh	(Chinese Taipei) Hung Jui-chen (India) Vignesh Peranamallur (South Africa) Keith-Patrick Crowley (India) Abdullah Shaikh
June 10	Israel F11 Futures; Herzlia, Israel; Hard $10,000	(Russia) Alexander Kudryavtsev; 5–7, 6–4, 6–4	(France) Albano Olivetti	(France) Élie Rousset (France) Antoine Benneteau	(Republic of Ireland) Sam Barry (Israel) Or Ram-Harel (United Kingdom) Ashley Hewitt (Czech Republic) Michal Konečný
June 10	Israel F11 Futures; Herzlia, Israel; Hard $10,000	(France) Albano Olivetti (France) Élie Rousset; 6–4, 6–7^{(5–7)}, [10–4]	(Republic of Ireland) Sam Barry (Czech Republic) Michal Konečný	(France) Élie Rousset (France) Antoine Benneteau	(Republic of Ireland) Sam Barry (Israel) Or Ram-Harel (United Kingdom) Ashley Hewitt (Czech Republic) Michal Konečný
June 10	Italy F12 Futures; Padova, Italy; Clay $15,000	(Italy) Salvatore Caruso; 7–6^{(7–3)}, 6–7^{(3–7)}, 6–0	(Italy) Enrico Burzi	(Italy) Walter Trusendi (Argentina) Andrés Molteni	(Argentina) Leandro Migani (Italy) Viktor Galović (Italy) Stefano Travaglia (Portugal) Rui Machado
June 10	Italy F12 Futures; Padova, Italy; Clay $15,000	(Argentina) Andrés Molteni (Italy) Walter Trusendi; 6–7^{(10–12)}, 6–3, [10–5]	(Australia) Alex Bolt (Germany) Sami Reinwein	(Italy) Walter Trusendi (Argentina) Andrés Molteni	(Argentina) Leandro Migani (Italy) Viktor Galović (Italy) Stefano Travaglia (Portugal) Rui Machado
June 10	Japan F5 Futures; Karuizawa, Japan; Clay $10,000	(Japan) Shuichi Sekiguchi; 6–2, 6–2	(Japan) Yuuya Kibi	(Japan) Yohei Ono (Japan) Yasutaka Uchiyama	(Japan) Yuichi Ito (Japan) Hiromasa Oku (Japan) Sho Katayama (Japan) Takuto Niki
June 10	Japan F5 Futures; Karuizawa, Japan; Clay $10,000	(Japan) Sho Katayama (Japan) Bumpei Sato; 6–1, 6–4	(Japan) Koichi Sano (Japan) Masaki Sasai	(Japan) Yohei Ono (Japan) Yasutaka Uchiyama	(Japan) Yuichi Ito (Japan) Hiromasa Oku (Japan) Sho Katayama (Japan) Takuto Niki
June 10	Korea F6 Futures; Gimcheon, Korea; Hard $10,000	(South Korea) Chung Hyeon; 6–2, 6–3	(Spain) Enrique López Pérez	(South Korea) Na Jung-woong (South Korea) Nam Hyun-woo	(South Korea) Lee Duck-hee (South Korea) Cho Min-hyeok (South Korea) Kim Cheong-eui (Chinese Taipei) Huang Liang-chi
June 10	Korea F6 Futures; Gimcheon, Korea; Hard $10,000	(South Korea) Chung Hong (South Korea) Noh Sang-woo; 6–1, 7–5	(South Korea) Chung Hyeon (South Korea) Lee Duck-hee	(South Korea) Na Jung-woong (South Korea) Nam Hyun-woo	(South Korea) Lee Duck-hee (South Korea) Cho Min-hyeok (South Korea) Kim Cheong-eui (Chinese Taipei) Huang Liang-chi
June 10	Mexico F12 Futures; Quintana Roo, Mexico; Hard $10,000	(Slovenia) Blaž Rola; 7–6^{(8–6)}, 6–4	(Brazil) José Pereira	(Dominican Republic) José Hernández (Colombia) Felipe Escobar	(Ecuador) Iván Endara (United States) Jean-Yves Aubone (France) Clément Reix (Germany) Jonas Lütjen
June 10	Mexico F12 Futures; Quintana Roo, Mexico; Hard $10,000	(Germany) Yannick Hanfmann (Germany) Jonas Lütjen; 6–7^{(2–7)}, 7–6^{(7–3)}, [10–8]	(Mexico) Alejandro Moreno Figueroa (Brazil) José Pereira	(Dominican Republic) José Hernández (Colombia) Felipe Escobar	(Ecuador) Iván Endara (United States) Jean-Yves Aubone (France) Clément Reix (Germany) Jonas Lütjen
June 10	Morocco F3 Futures; Mohammedia, Morocco; Clay $10,000	(Sweden) Markus Eriksson; 6–2, 6–3	(Algeria) Lamine Ouahab	(Finland) Micke Kontinen (Sweden) Isak Arvidsson	(France) Tak Khunn Wang (Sweden) Christian Lindell (Morocco) Younès Rachidi (Sweden) Patrik Rosenholm
June 10	Morocco F3 Futures; Mohammedia, Morocco; Clay $10,000	(Sweden) Isak Arvidsson (Finland) Micke Kontinen; 7–6^{(7–3)}, 6–3	(Morocco) Yassine Idmbarek (Morocco) Mehdi Jdi	(Finland) Micke Kontinen (Sweden) Isak Arvidsson	(France) Tak Khunn Wang (Sweden) Christian Lindell (Morocco) Younès Rachidi (Sweden) Patrik Rosenholm
June 10	Netherlands F1 Futures; Amstelveen, Netherlands; Clay $15,000	(United States) Bjorn Fratangelo; 3–6, 6–4, 6–3	(Brazil) Thiago Monteiro	(Netherlands) Thomas Schoorel (South Africa) Fritz Wolmarans	(Brazil) Wilson Leite (United States) Mico Santiago (Chile) Gonzalo Lama (Brazil) Ricardo Hocevar
June 10	Netherlands F1 Futures; Amstelveen, Netherlands; Clay $15,000	(Finland) Henri Kontinen (Indonesia) Christopher Rungkat; 6–1, 7–5	(Netherlands) Niels Lootsma (Netherlands) Jelle Sels	(Netherlands) Thomas Schoorel (South Africa) Fritz Wolmarans	(Brazil) Wilson Leite (United States) Mico Santiago (Chile) Gonzalo Lama (Brazil) Ricardo Hocevar
June 10	Serbia F1 Futures; Belgrade, Serbia; Clay $10,000	(Serbia) Miljan Zekić; 7–6^{(7–3)}, 6–2	(Serbia) Danilo Petrović	(Spain) Juan Lizariturry (France) Gleb Sakharov	(Serbia) Nikola Ćirić (North Macedonia) Shendrit Deari (Bulgaria) Dimitar Kutrovsky (Serbia) Ilija Vučić
June 10	Serbia F1 Futures; Belgrade, Serbia; Clay $10,000	(Serbia) Nikola Ćirić (Montenegro) Goran Tošić; 6–3, 6–3	(Italy) Giorgio Portaluri (Sweden) Lucas Renard	(Spain) Juan Lizariturry (France) Gleb Sakharov	(Serbia) Nikola Ćirić (North Macedonia) Shendrit Deari (Bulgaria) Dimitar Kutrovsky (Serbia) Ilija Vučić
June 10	Slovenia F3 Futures; Litija, Slovenia; Clay $10,000	(France) Axel Michon; 6–0, 6–4	(Italy) Simone Vagnozzi	(Italy) Erik Crepaldi (Austria) Nicolas Reissig	(Germany) Jeremy Jahn (Germany) Daniel Uhlig (Slovenia) Mike Urbanija (Russia) Stepan Khotulev
June 10	Slovenia F3 Futures; Litija, Slovenia; Clay $10,000	(Austria) Sebastian Bader (United States) Erik Elliott; 6–3, 6–3	(Italy) Erik Crepaldi (Colombia) Cristian Rodríguez	(Italy) Erik Crepaldi (Austria) Nicolas Reissig	(Germany) Jeremy Jahn (Germany) Daniel Uhlig (Slovenia) Mike Urbanija (Russia) Stepan Khotulev
June 10	Spain F17 Futures; Martos, Spain; Hard $10,000	(Canada) Steven Diez; 7–5, 6–7^{(4–7)}, 6–4	(India) Ramkumar Ramanathan	(Spain) David Vega Hernández (Spain) José Checa Calvo	(India) Ashwin Vijayragavan (Spain) Roberto Ortega Olmedo (France) Matthieu Roy (Spain) Ricardo Villacorta-Alonso
June 10	Spain F17 Futures; Martos, Spain; Hard $10,000	(India) Ramkumar Ramanathan (India) Ashwin Vijayragavan; 6–3, 5–7, [11–9]	(Spain) Roberto Ortega Olmedo (Spain) Ricardo Villacorta-Alonso	(Spain) David Vega Hernández (Spain) José Checa Calvo	(India) Ashwin Vijayragavan (Spain) Roberto Ortega Olmedo (France) Matthieu Roy (Spain) Ricardo Villacorta-Alonso
June 10	Turkey F23 Futures; Manisa, Turkey; Clay $10,000	(Argentina) Maximiliano Estévez; 6–3, 6–7^{(4–7)}, 7–6^{(7–5)}	(Russia) Mikhail Biryukov	(Finland) Herkko Pöllänen (Ukraine) Denys Mylokostov	(Tunisia) Mohamed Haythem Abid (United Kingdom) Jathan Malik (United States) William Boe-Wiegaard (Zimbabwe) Takanyi Garanganga
June 10	Turkey F23 Futures; Manisa, Turkey; Clay $10,000	(Ukraine) Gleb Alekseenko (Russia) Mikhail Biryukov; 2–6, 7–6^{(7–4)}, [10–7]	(Ukraine) Vladyslav Manafov (Switzerland) Luca Margaroli	(Finland) Herkko Pöllänen (Ukraine) Denys Mylokostov	(Tunisia) Mohamed Haythem Abid (United Kingdom) Jathan Malik (United States) William Boe-Wiegaard (Zimbabwe) Takanyi Garanganga
June 10	USA F15 Futures; Indian Harbour Beach, United States; Clay $10,000	(United States) Jesse Witten; 6–1, 6–4	(United States) Mitchell Frank	(Brazil) Fernando Romboli (El Salvador) Marcelo Arévalo	(United States) Chase Buchanan (United States) Kevin King (France) Gianni Mina (Latvia) Mārtiņš Podžus
June 10	USA F15 Futures; Indian Harbour Beach, United States; Clay $10,000	(Moldova) Roman Borvanov (Canada) Milan Pokrajac; 7–6^{(7–4)}, 6–3	(El Salvador) Marcelo Arévalo (Venezuela) Roberto Maytín	(Brazil) Fernando Romboli (El Salvador) Marcelo Arévalo	(United States) Chase Buchanan (United States) Kevin King (France) Gianni Mina (Latvia) Mārtiņš Podžus
June 17	Belgium F1 Futures; Brussels, Belgium; Clay $10,000	(France) Tak Khunn Wang; 6–3, 3–6, 6–0	(Belgium) Julien Cagnina	(Serbia) Ivan Bjelica (North Macedonia) Dimitar Grabul	(Sweden) Jacob Adaktusson (Switzerland) Alexander Ritschard (Germany) Maximilian Dinslaken (Australia) Gavin van Peperzeel
June 17	Belgium F1 Futures; Brussels, Belgium; Clay $10,000	(Belgium) Kevin Farin (North Macedonia) Dimitar Grabul; 6–1, 6–7^{(3–7)}, [10–3]	(France) Diego Garcia (France) Laurent Malouli	(Serbia) Ivan Bjelica (North Macedonia) Dimitar Grabul	(Sweden) Jacob Adaktusson (Switzerland) Alexander Ritschard (Germany) Maximilian Dinslaken (Australia) Gavin van Peperzeel
June 17	Bosnia & Herzegovina F4 Futures; Kiseljak, Bosnia & Herzegovina; Clay $10,000	(Croatia) Mate Delić; 7–5, 6–2	(Bosnia and Herzegovina) Damir Džumhur	(Slovakia) Juraj Masár (Bosnia and Herzegovina) Ismar Gorčić	(Croatia) Joško Topić (Germany) Pirmin Hänle (Croatia) Duje Kekez (Montenegro) Ljubomir Čelebić
June 17	Bosnia & Herzegovina F4 Futures; Kiseljak, Bosnia & Herzegovina; Clay $10,000	(Croatia) Mate Delić (Croatia) Tomislav Draganja; 6–4, 6–3	(Croatia) Filip Veger (Croatia) Lovro Zovko	(Slovakia) Juraj Masár (Bosnia and Herzegovina) Ismar Gorčić	(Croatia) Joško Topić (Germany) Pirmin Hänle (Croatia) Duje Kekez (Montenegro) Ljubomir Čelebić
June 17	Bulgaria F4 Futures; Burgas, Bulgaria; Clay $10,000	(Bulgaria) Tihomir Grozdanov; 6–4, 3–6, 6–2	(France) Mathias Bourgue	(France) Martin Vaïsse (Netherlands) Colin van Beem	(Bulgaria) Valentin Dimov (France) Romain Sichez (Netherlands) Jeroen Benard (Czech Republic) Michal Schmid
June 17	Bulgaria F4 Futures; Burgas, Bulgaria; Clay $10,000	(Czech Republic) Roman Jebavý (Czech Republic) Michal Schmid; 6–2, 6–1	(Ukraine) Gleb Alekseenko (Ukraine) Alexandr Kushakov	(France) Martin Vaïsse (Netherlands) Colin van Beem	(Bulgaria) Valentin Dimov (France) Romain Sichez (Netherlands) Jeroen Benard (Czech Republic) Michal Schmid
June 17	Egypt F12 Futures; Sharm El Sheikh, Egypt; Clay $10,000	(Russia) Aslan Karatsev; 6–4, 7–5	(Egypt) Karim Hossam	(Ukraine) Ivan Anikanov (Brazil) João Pedro Sorgi	(Egypt) Karim-Mohamed Maamoun (Brazil) André Miele (Austria) Peter Goldsteiner (Russia) Ivan Nedelko
June 17	Egypt F12 Futures; Sharm El Sheikh, Egypt; Clay $10,000	(Brazil) André Miele (Brazil) João Pedro Sorgi; 6–4, 6–4	(New Zealand) Ryoma Sloane (Norway) Oystein Steiro	(Ukraine) Ivan Anikanov (Brazil) João Pedro Sorgi	(Egypt) Karim-Mohamed Maamoun (Brazil) André Miele (Austria) Peter Goldsteiner (Russia) Ivan Nedelko
June 17	Germany F6 Futures; Cologne, Germany; Clay $10,000	(Germany) Jeremy Jahn; 6–3, 6–0	(Slovakia) Kamil Čapkovič	(Germany) Florian Fallert (Germany) Richard Becker	(Germany) Jean-Marc Werner (Greece) Theodoros Angelinos (Germany) Daniel Masur (Russia) Alexey Vatutin
June 17	Germany F6 Futures; Cologne, Germany; Clay $10,000	(Russia) Andrei Plotniy (Kazakhstan) Denis Yevseyev; 6–3, 6–3	(Belarus) Nikolai Fidirko (Belarus) Andrei Vasilevski	(Germany) Florian Fallert (Germany) Richard Becker	(Germany) Jean-Marc Werner (Greece) Theodoros Angelinos (Germany) Daniel Masur (Russia) Alexey Vatutin
June 17	Israel F12 Futures; Herzlia, Israel; Hard $10,000	(Russia) Alexander Kudryavtsev; 6–3, 4–6, 6–3	(United Kingdom) Ashley Hewitt	(France) Antoine Benneteau (Israel) Bar Tzuf Botzer	(Czech Republic) Michal Konečný (United States) Alexios Halebian (South Africa) Dean O'Brien (Republic of Ireland) Sam Barry
June 17	Israel F12 Futures; Herzlia, Israel; Hard $10,000	(Republic of Ireland) Sam Barry (France) Élie Rousset; 6–1, 6–1	(United Kingdom) Ashley Hewitt (United Kingdom) George Morgan	(France) Antoine Benneteau (Israel) Bar Tzuf Botzer	(Czech Republic) Michal Konečný (United States) Alexios Halebian (South Africa) Dean O'Brien (Republic of Ireland) Sam Barry
June 17	Italy F14 Futures; Siena, Italy; Clay $10,000	(Italy) Roberto Marcora; 6–2, 4–6, 6–3	(Italy) Edoardo Eremin	(Italy) Alessandro Colella (Monaco) Benjamin Balleret	(Italy) Viktor Galović (Italy) Giulio Torroni (Netherlands) Mark Vervoort (Italy) Salvatore Caruso
June 17	Italy F14 Futures; Siena, Italy; Clay $10,000	(Italy) Claudio Grassi (Italy) Adelchi Virgili; 6–1, 6–4	(Italy) Salvatore Caruso (Italy) Antonio Massara	(Italy) Alessandro Colella (Monaco) Benjamin Balleret	(Italy) Viktor Galović (Italy) Giulio Torroni (Netherlands) Mark Vervoort (Italy) Salvatore Caruso
June 17	Japan F6 Futures; Akishima, Japan; Carpet $10,000	(Japan) Takashi Saito; 4–6, 6–1, 6–0	(Japan) Katsuki Nagao	(Japan) Gengo Kikuchi (Japan) Sho Katayama	(Japan) Yuuya Kibi (Chinese Taipei) Wang Chieh-fu (Japan) Shunrou Takeshima (Japan) Takeshi Endo
June 17	Japan F6 Futures; Akishima, Japan; Carpet $10,000	(Japan) Sho Katayama (Japan) Shota Tagawa; 7–5, 5–7, [11–9]	(Japan) Hiroki Kondo (Japan) Kento Takeuchi	(Japan) Gengo Kikuchi (Japan) Sho Katayama	(Japan) Yuuya Kibi (Chinese Taipei) Wang Chieh-fu (Japan) Shunrou Takeshima (Japan) Takeshi Endo
June 17	Korea F7 Futures; Gimcheon, Korea; Hard $10,000	(South Korea) Lim Yong-kyu; 7–6^{(7–5)}, 6–4	(South Korea) Kim Cheong-eui	(South Korea) Nam Ji-sung (South Korea) Lim Hyung-chan	(Spain) Enrique López Pérez (United States) Nicolas Meister (South Korea) Cho Soong-jae (Chinese Taipei) Huang Liang-chi
June 17	Korea F7 Futures; Gimcheon, Korea; Hard $10,000	(Chinese Taipei) Huang Liang-chi (Spain) Enrique López Pérez; 6–4, 6–2	(South Korea) Lim Yong-kyu (South Korea) Nam Ji-sung	(South Korea) Nam Ji-sung (South Korea) Lim Hyung-chan	(Spain) Enrique López Pérez (United States) Nicolas Meister (South Korea) Cho Soong-jae (Chinese Taipei) Huang Liang-chi
June 17	Netherlands F2 Futures; Alkmaar, Netherlands; Clay $15,000	(United States) Mitchell Krueger; 4–6, 7–5, 6–2	(Brazil) Ricardo Hocevar	(Romania) Robert Constantinovici (South Africa) Fritz Wolmarans	(Netherlands Antilles) Alexander Blom (Netherlands) Thomas Schoorel (United States) Bjorn Fratangelo (Brazil) Thiago Monteiro
June 17	Netherlands F2 Futures; Alkmaar, Netherlands; Clay $15,000	(Finland) Henri Kontinen (Indonesia) Christopher Rungkat; 7–5, 7–6^{(9–7)}	(Czech Republic) David Škoch (Czech Republic) Jan Zedník	(Romania) Robert Constantinovici (South Africa) Fritz Wolmarans	(Netherlands Antilles) Alexander Blom (Netherlands) Thomas Schoorel (United States) Bjorn Fratangelo (Brazil) Thiago Monteiro
June 17	Romania F4 Futures; Cluj-Napoca, Romania; Clay $15,000	(Portugal) Rui Machado; 6–2, 6–0	(Romania) Guillermo Olaso	(Romania) Patrick Ciorcilă (Moldova) Maxim Dubarenco	(France) Maxime Chazal (Switzerland) Luca Margaroli (Czech Republic) Jan Blecha (Spain) Adam Sanjurjo Hermida
June 17	Romania F4 Futures; Cluj-Napoca, Romania; Clay $15,000	(Spain) Carlos Boluda-Purkiss (Spain) Adam Sanjurjo Hermida; 6–7^{(5–7)}, 7–6^{(7–5)}, [10–6]	(Romania) Victor Vlad Cornea (Romania) Tudor Cristian Șulea	(Romania) Patrick Ciorcilă (Moldova) Maxim Dubarenco	(France) Maxime Chazal (Switzerland) Luca Margaroli (Czech Republic) Jan Blecha (Spain) Adam Sanjurjo Hermida
June 17	Serbia F2 Futures; Belgrade, Serbia; Clay $10,000	(Serbia) Miljan Zekić; 6–1, 7–5	(Serbia) Danilo Petrović	(France) Hugo Nys (Serbia) Marko Tepavac	(France) Alexandre Müller (Hungary) Viktor Filipenkó (Spain) Juan Lizariturry (Slovakia) Adrian Partl
June 17	Serbia F2 Futures; Belgrade, Serbia; Clay $10,000	(Slovakia) Patrik Fabian (Slovakia) Adrian Partl; 6–4, 6–1	(France) Romain Arneodo (France) Hugo Nys	(France) Hugo Nys (Serbia) Marko Tepavac	(France) Alexandre Müller (Hungary) Viktor Filipenkó (Spain) Juan Lizariturry (Slovakia) Adrian Partl
June 17	Spain F18 Futures; Melilla, Spain; Hard $10,000	(Spain) Ricardo Villacorta-Alonso; 6–1, 6–4	(Spain) Iván Arenas-Gualda	(Spain) Ricardo Ojeda Lara (France) Matthieu Roy	(Spain) Jaime Pulgar-García (Spain) Oriol Roca Batalla (Spain) David Vega Hernández (Spain) Roberto Ortega Olmedo
June 17	Spain F18 Futures; Melilla, Spain; Hard $10,000	(Spain) Iván Arenas-Gualda (Spain) Jaime Pulgar-García; 6–2, 7–6^{(7–1)}	(Spain) Eduard Esteve Lobato (Spain) David Vega Hernández	(Spain) Ricardo Ojeda Lara (France) Matthieu Roy	(Spain) Jaime Pulgar-García (Spain) Oriol Roca Batalla (Spain) David Vega Hernández (Spain) Roberto Ortega Olmedo
June 17	Turkey F24 Futures; Istanbul, Turkey; Hard $10,000	(Zimbabwe) Takanyi Garanganga; 6–3, 7–5	(South Africa) Nikala Scholtz	(Brazil) Tiago Fernandes (Australia) Dayne Kelly	(France) Jules Marie (South Africa) Tucker Vorster (France) Rudy Coco (Turkey) Cem İlkel
June 17	Turkey F24 Futures; Istanbul, Turkey; Hard $10,000	(South Africa) Nikala Scholtz (South Africa) Tucker Vorster; 7–6^{(7–1)}, 6–4	(Russia) Alexandre Krasnoroutskiy (Russia) Anton Manegin	(Brazil) Tiago Fernandes (Australia) Dayne Kelly	(France) Jules Marie (South Africa) Tucker Vorster (France) Rudy Coco (Turkey) Cem İlkel
June 17	USA F16 Futures; Amelia Island, United States; Clay $10,000	(United States) Dennis Novikov; 1–6, 7–6^{(7–5)}, 6–4	(United States) Jarmere Jenkins	(United States) Chase Buchanan (United States) Jason Tahir	(United States) Mitchell Frank (Brazil) Fernando Romboli (United States) Jason Jung (United States) Andrew Carter
June 17	USA F16 Futures; Amelia Island, United States; Clay $10,000	(United States) Jarmere Jenkins (United States) Mac Styslinger; 6–4, 6–2	(El Salvador) Marcelo Arévalo (Venezuela) Roberto Maytín	(United States) Chase Buchanan (United States) Jason Tahir	(United States) Mitchell Frank (Brazil) Fernando Romboli (United States) Jason Jung (United States) Andrew Carter
June 24	Austria F1 Futures; Seefeld, Austria; Clay $10,000	(Italy) Walter Trusendi; 7–5, 4–6, 6–1	(Austria) Christian Trubrig	(Slovenia) Janez Semrajc (Austria) Patrick Ofner	(Czech Republic) Dominik Süč (Austria) Lukas Jastraunig (United States) Adam El Mihdawy (Germany) David Thurner
June 24	Austria F1 Futures; Seefeld, Austria; Clay $10,000	(Czech Republic) Jan Kunčík (Czech Republic) Jaroslav Pospíšil; 6–3, 6–4	(Austria) Sebastian Bader (United States) Erik Elliott	(Slovenia) Janez Semrajc (Austria) Patrick Ofner	(Czech Republic) Dominik Süč (Austria) Lukas Jastraunig (United States) Adam El Mihdawy (Germany) David Thurner
June 24	Belgium F2 Futures; Havré, Belgium; Clay $10,000	(Belgium) Kimmer Coppejans; 7–6^{(7–4)}, 6–1	(Netherlands) Boy Westerhof	(France) Julien Obry (Belgium) Alexandre Folie	(United Kingdom) Oliver Golding (Netherlands) Wesley Koolhof (North Macedonia) Dimitar Grabul (Belgium) Germain Gigounon
June 24	Belgium F2 Futures; Havré, Belgium; Clay $10,000	(Australia) Maverick Banes (Australia) Gavin van Peperzeel; 6–4, 6–4	(Belgium) Romain Barbosa (Belgium) Jordan Paquot	(France) Julien Obry (Belgium) Alexandre Folie	(United Kingdom) Oliver Golding (Netherlands) Wesley Koolhof (North Macedonia) Dimitar Grabul (Belgium) Germain Gigounon
June 24	Bulgaria F5 Futures; Stara Zagora, Bulgaria; Clay $10,000	(Czech Republic) Roman Jebavý; 7–5, 6–4	(Bulgaria) Dimitar Kutrovsky	(France) Mathias Bourgue (Spain) Andrés Artuñedo	(Bulgaria) Tihomir Grozdanov (France) Martin Vaïsse (Chile) Laslo Urrutia Fuentes (Russia) Alexander Zhurbin
June 24	Bulgaria F5 Futures; Stara Zagora, Bulgaria; Clay $10,000	(Ukraine) Gleb Alekseenko (Russia) Alexander Igoshin; 6–4, 4–6, [10–7]	(Spain) Andrés Artuñedo (Chile) Laslo Urrutia Fuentes	(France) Mathias Bourgue (Spain) Andrés Artuñedo	(Bulgaria) Tihomir Grozdanov (France) Martin Vaïsse (Chile) Laslo Urrutia Fuentes (Russia) Alexander Zhurbin
June 24	Egypt F13 Futures; Sharm El Sheikh, Egypt; Clay $10,000	(Egypt) Karim Hossam; 6–2, 6–3	(Brazil) André Miele	(Morocco) Hicham Khaddari (Brazil) João Pedro Sorgi	(Russia) Ivan Nedelko (Egypt) Karim-Mohamed Maamoun (Ukraine) Denys Mylokostov (Egypt) Sherif Sabry
June 24	Egypt F13 Futures; Sharm El Sheikh, Egypt; Clay $10,000	(Brazil) André Miele (Brazil) João Pedro Sorgi; 6–2, 2–6, [10–3]	(Italy) Francesco Garzelli (Italy) Omar Giacalone	(Morocco) Hicham Khaddari (Brazil) João Pedro Sorgi	(Russia) Ivan Nedelko (Egypt) Karim-Mohamed Maamoun (Ukraine) Denys Mylokostov (Egypt) Sherif Sabry
June 24	France F10 Futures; Toulon, France; Clay $15,000	(France) David Guez; 6–4, 6–0	(France) Gianni Mina	(France) Laurent Lokoli (France) Tak Khunn Wang	(France) Dorian Descloix (France) Nicolas Renavand (France) Lucas Pouille (France) Jonathan Eysseric
June 24	France F10 Futures; Toulon, France; Clay $15,000	(Monaco) Benjamin Balleret (France) Hugo Nys; 7–5, 6–4	(France) David Couronne (France) Vincent Verpeaux	(France) Laurent Lokoli (France) Tak Khunn Wang	(France) Dorian Descloix (France) Nicolas Renavand (France) Lucas Pouille (France) Jonathan Eysseric
June 24	Germany F7 Futures; Römerberg, Germany; Clay $10,000	(France) Pierre-Hugues Herbert; 6–4, 6–4	(Switzerland) Alexander Ritschard	(Germany) Kevin Krawietz (Australia) Alex Bolt	(Germany) Florian Fallert (Germany) Oscar Otte (Chile) Cristóbal Saavedra Corvalán (Germany) Lukas Finzelberg
June 24	Germany F7 Futures; Römerberg, Germany; Clay $10,000	(France) Pierre-Hugues Herbert (France) Albano Olivetti; 6–7^{(3–7)}, 6–4, [10–5]	(Czech Republic) Marek Michalička (Czech Republic) David Pultr	(Germany) Kevin Krawietz (Australia) Alex Bolt	(Germany) Florian Fallert (Germany) Oscar Otte (Chile) Cristóbal Saavedra Corvalán (Germany) Lukas Finzelberg
June 24	Italy F13 Futures; Busto Arsizio, Italy; Clay $15,000	(Italy) Simone Vagnozzi; 4–6, 6–3, 6–0	(Czech Republic) Dušan Lojda	(Portugal) Rui Machado (Italy) Alberto Brizzi	(Italy) Davide Pontoglio (Italy) Enrico Burzi (Italy) Viktor Galović (Argentina) Andrés Molteni
June 24	Italy F13 Futures; Busto Arsizio, Italy; Clay $15,000	(Italy) Riccardo Ghedin (Italy) Claudio Grassi; 6–0, 6–3	(Argentina) Andrés Molteni (Italy) Francesco Picco	(Portugal) Rui Machado (Italy) Alberto Brizzi	(Italy) Davide Pontoglio (Italy) Enrico Burzi (Italy) Viktor Galović (Argentina) Andrés Molteni
June 24	Japan F7 Futures; Sapporo, Japan; Clay $15,000	(Japan) Shuichi Sekiguchi; 6–4, 2–6, 7–5	(Japan) Yasutaka Uchiyama	(New Zealand) José Statham (Japan) Arata Onozawa	(Japan) Kento Takeuchi (Japan) Jumpei Yamasaki (Japan) Hiroyasu Ehara (Japan) Keita Koyama
June 24	Japan F7 Futures; Sapporo, Japan; Clay $15,000	(Japan) Katsuki Nagao (Japan) Hiromasa Oku; 6–1, 7–5	(Japan) Hiroki Kondo (New Zealand) José Statham	(New Zealand) José Statham (Japan) Arata Onozawa	(Japan) Kento Takeuchi (Japan) Jumpei Yamasaki (Japan) Hiroyasu Ehara (Japan) Keita Koyama
June 24	Korea F8 Futures; Gimcheon, Korea; Hard $10,000	(South Korea) Kim Cheong-eui; 7–6^{(8–6)}, 7–6^{(7–5)}	(South Korea) Cho Min-hyeok	(Chinese Taipei) Huang Liang-chi (South Korea) Kang Byung-kook	(Thailand) Kittiphong Wachiramanowong (South Korea) Cho Soong-jae (South Korea) Na Jung-woong (United States) Connor Farren
June 24	Korea F8 Futures; Gimcheon, Korea; Hard $10,000	(South Korea) Jun Woong-sun (South Korea) Kwon Oh-hee; 6–3, 1–6, [10–8]	(South Korea) Cho Soong-jae (South Korea) Choi Dong-whee	(Chinese Taipei) Huang Liang-chi (South Korea) Kang Byung-kook	(Thailand) Kittiphong Wachiramanowong (South Korea) Cho Soong-jae (South Korea) Na Jung-woong (United States) Connor Farren
June 24	Netherlands F3 Futures; Breda, Netherlands; Clay $15,000+H	(Netherlands) Thomas Schoorel; 6–4, 6–4	(Netherlands) Matwé Middelkoop	(South Africa) Fritz Wolmarans (Brazil) Leonardo Kirche	(United States) Bjorn Fratangelo (Brazil) Ricardo Hocevar (Netherlands) Antal van der Duim (United States) Mitchell Krueger
June 24	Netherlands F3 Futures; Breda, Netherlands; Clay $15,000+H	(Finland) Henri Kontinen (Indonesia) Christopher Rungkat; 6–4, 7–5	(United States) Bjorn Fratangelo (United States) Mitchell Krueger	(South Africa) Fritz Wolmarans (Brazil) Leonardo Kirche	(United States) Bjorn Fratangelo (Brazil) Ricardo Hocevar (Netherlands) Antal van der Duim (United States) Mitchell Krueger
June 24	Romania F5 Futures; Sibiu, Romania; Clay $10,000	(Romania) Victor Crivoi; 6–2, 6–3	(Greece) Theodoros Angelinos	(Moldova) Maxim Dubarenco (Romania) Patrick Ciorcilă	(Switzerland) Joss Espasandin (Romania) Răzvan Sabău (Romania) Petru-Alexandru Luncanu (Romania) Cătălin-Ionuț Gârd
June 24	Romania F5 Futures; Sibiu, Romania; Clay $10,000	(Romania) Victor Vlad Cornea (Romania) Tudor Cristian Șulea; 7–6^{(7–4)}, 1–6, [10–8]	(Romania) Patrick Ciorcilă (Romania) Victor Crivoi	(Moldova) Maxim Dubarenco (Romania) Patrick Ciorcilă	(Switzerland) Joss Espasandin (Romania) Răzvan Sabău (Romania) Petru-Alexandru Luncanu (Romania) Cătălin-Ionuț Gârd
June 24	Serbia F3 Futures; Šabac, Serbia; Clay $10,000	(Hungary) Attila Balázs; 6–4, 6–2	(Bosnia and Herzegovina) Damir Džumhur	(Serbia) Miki Janković (Serbia) Danilo Petrović	(Croatia) Duje Kekez (Hungary) Viktor Filipenkó (Slovakia) Adrian Partl (Italy) Matteo Fago
June 24	Serbia F3 Futures; Šabac, Serbia; Clay $10,000	(Slovakia) Patrik Fabian (Slovakia) Adrian Partl; 6–4, 3–6, [10–8]	(United Kingdom) Scott Clayton (United Kingdom) Toby Martin	(Serbia) Miki Janković (Serbia) Danilo Petrović	(Croatia) Duje Kekez (Hungary) Viktor Filipenkó (Slovakia) Adrian Partl (Italy) Matteo Fago
June 24	Spain F19 Futures; Palma del Río, Spain; Hard $15,000+H	(Spain) Gerard Granollers Pujol; 7–6^{(7–5)}, 4–6, 6–3	(Spain) Roberto Carballés Baena	(Canada) Steven Diez (Spain) Juan-Samuel Arauzo-Martínez	(Spain) Arnau Brugués Davi (Spain) Eduard Esteve Lobato (Spain) Jordi Samper Montaña (Spain) Sergio Gutiérrez Ferrol
June 24	Spain F19 Futures; Palma del Río, Spain; Hard $15,000+H	(Spain) Juan-Samuel Arauzo-Martínez (Spain) Jaime Pulgar-García; 7–5, 3–6, [10–6]	(Spain) Roberto Ortega Olmedo (Spain) Ricardo Villacorta-Alonso	(Canada) Steven Diez (Spain) Juan-Samuel Arauzo-Martínez	(Spain) Arnau Brugués Davi (Spain) Eduard Esteve Lobato (Spain) Jordi Samper Montaña (Spain) Sergio Gutiérrez Ferrol
June 24	Turkey F25 Futures; Istanbul, Turkey; Hard $10,000	(France) Rémi Boutillier; 7–6^{(7–3)}, 6–4	(Ukraine) Marat Deviatiarov	(South Africa) Dean O'Brien (Australia) Dayne Kelly	(United States) Chris Cooprider (South Africa) Ruan Roelofse (United States) Sean Berman (Zimbabwe) Takanyi Garanganga
June 24	Turkey F25 Futures; Istanbul, Turkey; Hard $10,000	(South Africa) Dean O'Brien (South Africa) Ruan Roelofse; 6–1, 4–6, [11–9]	(Turkey) Barış Ergüden (Turkey) Barkın Yalçınkale	(South Africa) Dean O'Brien (Australia) Dayne Kelly	(United States) Chris Cooprider (South Africa) Ruan Roelofse (United States) Sean Berman (Zimbabwe) Takanyi Garanganga
June 24	USA F17 Futures; Rochester, United States; Clay $10,000	(United States) Jarmere Jenkins; 5–7, 6–2, 6–2	(United States) Michael Shabaz	(United States) Chase Buchanan (United States) Marcus Fugate	(Brazil) Fernando Romboli (United States) Dennis Novikov (United States) Jason Jung (United States) Jason Tahir
June 24	USA F17 Futures; Rochester, United States; Clay $10,000	(United States) Chase Buchanan (Brazil) Fernando Romboli; 6–2, 6–3	(United States) Marcos Giron (United States) Dennis Novikov	(United States) Chase Buchanan (United States) Marcus Fugate	(Brazil) Fernando Romboli (United States) Dennis Novikov (United States) Jason Jung (United States) Jason Tahir
