= 2014 ITF Men's Circuit (July–September) =

This article includes the 2014 ITF Men's Circuit tournaments which occurred between July and September 2014.

== Point distribution ==
Tournament Category	W	F	SF	QF	R16	R32
Futures 15,000+H	35	20	10	4	1	0
Futures 15,000	27	15	8	3	1	0
Futures 10,000+H	27	15	8	3	1	0
Futures 10,000	18	10	6	2	1	0

== Key ==
$15,000 tournaments
$10,000 tournaments

== Month ==
=== July ===
Week of	Tournament	Winner	Runners-up	Semifinalists	Quarterfinalists
July 7	Canada F5 Futures; Saskatoon, Canada; Hard $15,000	Thanasi Kokkinakis; 7–6^{(7–4)}, 7–6^{(7–5)}	Fritz Wolmarans	Connor Smith; Benjamin Mitchell	Fares Ghasya; Théo Fournerie; Alexios Halebian; Tyler Hochwalt
July 7	Canada F5 Futures; Saskatoon, Canada; Hard $15,000	Hans Hach; Brayden Schnur; 6–2, 6–3	Mousheg Hovhannisyan; Alexander Sarkissian	Connor Smith; Benjamin Mitchell	Fares Ghasya; Théo Fournerie; Alexios Halebian; Tyler Hochwalt
July 7	France F14 Futures; Bourg-en-Bresse, France; Clay $15,000+H	Boris Pašanski; 4–6, 6–4, 6–3	Yannik Reuter	Florent Serra; Florian Reynet	Darian King; Constant Lestienne; Tristan Lamasine; Teri Groll
July 7	France F14 Futures; Bourg-en-Bresse, France; Clay $15,000+H	Quentin Halys; Maxime Hamou; 2–6, 6–2, [10–8]	Maxime Forcin; Ugo Nastasi	Florent Serra; Florian Reynet	Darian King; Constant Lestienne; Tristan Lamasine; Teri Groll
July 7	Germany F7 Futures; Kassel, Germany; Clay $15,000+H	Peter Torebko; 6–7^{(6–8)}, 6–4, 7–6^{(7–2)}	Dennis Novak	Arthur De Greef; Nicolás Jarry	Maximilian Marterer; Anton Zaitcev; Dušan Lojda; Alexey Vatutin
July 7	Germany F7 Futures; Kassel, Germany; Clay $15,000+H	Andriej Kapaś; Błażej Koniusz; 6–4, 6–2	Nicolás Jarry; Simón Navarro	Arthur De Greef; Nicolás Jarry	Maximilian Marterer; Anton Zaitcev; Dušan Lojda; Alexey Vatutin
July 7	Great Britain F13 Futures; Ilkley, Great Britain; Grass $15,000	Marcus Daniell; 6–2, 7–5	Lewis Burton	Brydan Klein; Neil Pauffley	Julian Cash; Keelan Oakley; Jonny O'Mara; Andrew Watson
July 7	Great Britain F13 Futures; Ilkley, Great Britain; Grass $15,000	Lewis Burton; Edward Corrie; 6–2, 6–4	Brydan Klein; Joshua Ward-Hibbert	Brydan Klein; Neil Pauffley	Julian Cash; Keelan Oakley; Jonny O'Mara; Andrew Watson
July 7	Italy F22 Futures; Sassuolo, Italy; Clay $15,000	Bjorn Fratangelo; 6–4, 2–0, ret.	Alberto Brizzi	Pietro Licciardi; José Hernández	Enrico Burzi; Simone Vagnozzi; Daniel Dutra da Silva; Federico Gaio
July 7	Italy F22 Futures; Sassuolo, Italy; Clay $15,000	Daniel Dutra da Silva; Bjorn Fratangelo; 7–5, 6–4	Filippo Leonardi; Luca Pancaldi	Pietro Licciardi; José Hernández	Enrico Burzi; Simone Vagnozzi; Daniel Dutra da Silva; Federico Gaio
July 7	Austria F3 Futures; Telfs, Austria; Clay $10,000	Adrian Partl; 4–6, 6–4, 6–3	Marek Semjan	Dominik Süč; Pascal Brunner	Jacob Kahoun; Rémi Boutillier; Gonçalo Oliveira; Bastian Trinker
July 7	Austria F3 Futures; Telfs, Austria; Clay $10,000	Patrick Ofner; Gonçalo Oliveira; 6–2, 3–6, [10–7]	Sebastian Bader; Gavin van Peperzeel	Dominik Süč; Pascal Brunner	Jacob Kahoun; Rémi Boutillier; Gonçalo Oliveira; Bastian Trinker
July 7	Belgium F6 Futures; Knokke, Belgium; Clay $10,000	Daniel Masur; 7–6^{(8–6)}, 4–6, 7–6^{(8–6)}	Dimitar Grabul	Jeroen Vanneste; Scott Griekspoor	Yannick Vandenbulcke; Julien Dubail; Jonas Merckx; David Fleming
July 7	Belgium F6 Futures; Knokke, Belgium; Clay $10,000	Cristóbal Saavedra Corvalán; Ricardo Urzúa Rivera; 6–4, 7–5	Ashok Narayana; Max Schnur	Jeroen Vanneste; Scott Griekspoor	Yannick Vandenbulcke; Julien Dubail; Jonas Merckx; David Fleming
July 7	Bulgaria F5 Futures; Plovdiv, Bulgaria; Clay $10,000	Mathias Bourgue; 6–4, 6–3	Edoardo Eremin	Grégoire Barrère; Konstantinos Mikos	Alexandar Lazov; Plamen Milushev; Gleb Sakharov; Cătălin-Ionuț Gârd
July 7	Bulgaria F5 Futures; Plovdiv, Bulgaria; Clay $10,000	Romain Arneodo; Luca Margaroli; 7–6^{(7–4)}, 6–4	Dinko Halachev; Vasko Mladenov	Grégoire Barrère; Konstantinos Mikos	Alexandar Lazov; Plamen Milushev; Gleb Sakharov; Cătălin-Ionuț Gârd
July 7	Hong Kong F1 Futures; Hong Kong; Hard $10,000	Lee Duck-hee; 6–1, 6–4	Wishaya Trongcharoenchaikul	Peter Kobelt; Yuichi Ito	Masato Shiga; Devin McCarthy; Evan Song; Gengo Kikuchi
July 7	Hong Kong F1 Futures; Hong Kong; Hard $10,000	Peter Kobelt; Devin McCarthy; 4–6, 6–3, [10–8]	Huang Liang-chi; Yu Cheng-yu	Peter Kobelt; Yuichi Ito	Masato Shiga; Devin McCarthy; Evan Song; Gengo Kikuchi
July 7	Romania F7 Futures; Pitești–Bascov, Romania; Clay $10,000	Filip Horanský; 6–4, 7–5	Vasco Mensurado	Petru-Alexandru Luncanu; Juan Sebastián Gómez	Maxim Dubarenco; Patrick Ciorcilă; Riccardo Sinicropi; Artur Completo
July 7	Romania F7 Futures; Pitești–Bascov, Romania; Clay $10,000	Ilie-Aurelian Giurgiu; Alexandru Jecan; 6–1, 6–4	Victor Vlad Cornea; Tudor Cristian Sulea	Petru-Alexandru Luncanu; Juan Sebastián Gómez	Maxim Dubarenco; Patrick Ciorcilă; Riccardo Sinicropi; Artur Completo
July 7	Serbia F4 Futures; Belgrade, Serbia; Clay $10,000	Jules Marie; 6–3, 6–4	Miki Janković	Juan Carlos Sáez; Ivan Bjelica	Ilija Vučić; Guillermo Rivera Aránguiz; Danilo Petrović; Ljubomir Čelebić
July 7	Serbia F4 Futures; Belgrade, Serbia; Clay $10,000	Guillermo Rivera Aránguiz; Juan Carlos Sáez; 7–5, 6–2	Danilo Petrović; Ilija Vučić	Juan Carlos Sáez; Ivan Bjelica	Ilija Vučić; Guillermo Rivera Aránguiz; Danilo Petrović; Ljubomir Čelebić
July 7	Spain F17 Futures; Getxo, Spain; Clay $10,000	Ramkumar Ramanathan; 6–4, 6–1	Marc Giner	David Pérez Sanz; Pol Toledo Bagué	Miguel Ángel Reyes-Varela; Adrien Puget; Matthieu Perchicot; Dante Gennaro
July 7	Spain F17 Futures; Getxo, Spain; Clay $10,000	David Pérez Sanz; Ramkumar Ramanathan; 5–7, 6–3, [10–4]	João Domingues; José Anton Salazar Martín	David Pérez Sanz; Pol Toledo Bagué	Miguel Ángel Reyes-Varela; Adrien Puget; Matthieu Perchicot; Dante Gennaro
July 7	Thailand F9 Futures; Bangkok, Thailand; Hard $10,000	Chen Ti; 6–4, 6–1	Dayne Kelly	Pruchya Isaro; Christopher Rungkat	Yannick Jankovits; Ryan Agar; Kittipong Wachiramanowong; Jeevan Nedunchezhiyan
July 7	Thailand F9 Futures; Bangkok, Thailand; Hard $10,000	Pruchya Isaro; Nuttanon Kadchapanan; 6–4, 6–1	Chen Ti; Ruan Roelofse	Pruchya Isaro; Christopher Rungkat	Yannick Jankovits; Ryan Agar; Kittipong Wachiramanowong; Jeevan Nedunchezhiyan
July 7	Turkey F24 Futures; Istanbul, Turkey; Hard $10,000	Hugo Nys; 7–6^{(7–5)}, 3–6, 7–6^{(7–4)}	Matija Pecotić	Javier Pulgar García; Barış Ergüden	Aldin Šetkić; Barkın Yalçınkale; Tomáš Papik; Cem İlkel
July 7	Turkey F24 Futures; Istanbul, Turkey; Hard $10,000	Darren Polkinghorne; Scott Puodziunas; 7–6^{(9–7)}, 7–6^{(7–5)}	Nikala Scholtz; Tucker Vorster	Javier Pulgar García; Barış Ergüden	Aldin Šetkić; Barkın Yalçınkale; Tomáš Papik; Cem İlkel
July 7	Venezuela F1 Futures; Caracas, Venezuela; Clay $10,000	Henrique Cunha; 7–5, 6–3	Mauricio Echazú	David Souto; Mateo Nicolás Martínez	Jorge Brian Panta; Jesús Bandrés; Luis David Martínez; Rogelio Siller
July 7	Venezuela F1 Futures; Caracas, Venezuela; Clay $10,000	Luis David Martínez; Mateo Nicolás Martínez; 7–6^{(8–6)}, 6–2	Jesús Bandrés; Luis Fernando Ramírez	David Souto; Mateo Nicolás Martínez	Jorge Brian Panta; Jesús Bandrés; Luis David Martínez; Rogelio Siller
July 14	Canada F6 Futures; Vancouver, Canada; Hard $15,000	Alexander Sarkissian; 7–6^{(7–3)}, 6–4	Connor Smith	Hans Hach; Fares Ghasya	Alexander Day; Kyle McMorrow; Connor Farren; Daniel Chu
July 14	Canada F6 Futures; Vancouver, Canada; Hard $15,000	Daniel Chu; Kyle McMorrow; 6–2, 5–7, [10–7]	Riaan du Toit; Alejandro Tabilo	Hans Hach; Fares Ghasya	Alexander Day; Kyle McMorrow; Connor Farren; Daniel Chu
July 14	China F8 Futures; Shenzhen, China; Hard $15,000	Bai Yan; 4–6, 6–2, 6–1	Li Zhe	Zhang Ze; Cao Zhaoyi	Cho Min-hyeok; Wang Aoxiong; Yu Cheng-yu; Nikola Milojević
July 14	China F8 Futures; Shenzhen, China; Hard $15,000	Bai Yan; Zhang Zhizhen; 6–4, 4–6, [10–3]	Hua Runhao; Qiu Zhuoyang	Zhang Ze; Cao Zhaoyi	Cho Min-hyeok; Wang Aoxiong; Yu Cheng-yu; Nikola Milojević
July 14	France F15 Futures; Saint-Gervais-les-Bains, France; Clay $15,000	Martin Vaïsse; 6–3, 6–3	Aslan Karatsev	Alexis Musialek; Quentin Halys	Constant Lestienne; Julien Obry; Tristan Lamasine; Fabiano de Paula
July 14	France F15 Futures; Saint-Gervais-les-Bains, France; Clay $15,000	Adham El-Effendi; Darren Walsh; 7–6^{(9–7)}, 6–3	Olivier Charroin; Laurent Rochette	Alexis Musialek; Quentin Halys	Constant Lestienne; Julien Obry; Tristan Lamasine; Fabiano de Paula
July 14	Great Britain F14 Futures; Frinton-on-Sea, Great Britain; Grass $15,000	David Rice; 6–4, 6–4	George Coupland	Edward Corrie; Brydan Klein	Adam Thornton-Brown; Myles Orton; Joshua Ward-Hibbert; Joshua Milton
July 14	Great Britain F14 Futures; Frinton-on-Sea, Great Britain; Grass $15,000	George Coupland; David Rice; 6–4, ret.	Jack Findel-Hawkins; Toby Mitchell	Edward Corrie; Brydan Klein	Adam Thornton-Brown; Myles Orton; Joshua Ward-Hibbert; Joshua Milton
July 14	Italy F23 Futures; Modena, Italy; Clay $15,000	Daniele Giorgini; 6–3, 6–4	Federico Gaio	Roberto Marcora; Stefano Travaglia	Mohamed Safwat; José Hernández; Alessandro Giannessi; Gianluca Naso
July 14	Italy F23 Futures; Modena, Italy; Clay $15,000	Pietro Rondoni; Stefano Travaglia; 6–2, 6–4	Omar Giacalone; Gianluca Naso	Roberto Marcora; Stefano Travaglia	Mohamed Safwat; José Hernández; Alessandro Giannessi; Gianluca Naso
July 14	Venezuela F2 Futures; Valencia, Venezuela; Hard $15,000	Mateo Nicolás Martínez; 7–6^{(7–3)}, 2–6, 7–6^{(7–5)}	Thales Turini	Roberto Quiroz; Nicolás Alberto Arreche	David Souto; Henrique Cunha; Mauricio Echazú; Jorge Brian Panta
July 14	Venezuela F2 Futures; Valencia, Venezuela; Hard $15,000	Mateo Nicolás Martínez; Luis Patiño; 6–2, 6–4	Jorge Brian Panta; Duilio Vallebuona	Roberto Quiroz; Nicolás Alberto Arreche	David Souto; Henrique Cunha; Mauricio Echazú; Jorge Brian Panta
July 14	Argentina F10 Futures; Buenos Aires, Argentina; Clay $10,000	Andrés Molteni; 6–2, 0–6, 6–1	Marco Trungelliti	Martín Cuevas; Federico Coria	Valentin Florez; Matías Rodolfo Buchhass; Juan Pablo Paz; Juan Ignacio Galarza
July 14	Argentina F10 Futures; Buenos Aires, Argentina; Clay $10,000	Mariano Kestelboim; Marco Trungelliti; 6–1, 6–4	Valentin Florez; Ryūsei Makiguchi	Martín Cuevas; Federico Coria	Valentin Florez; Matías Rodolfo Buchhass; Juan Pablo Paz; Juan Ignacio Galarza
July 14	Austria F4 Futures; Kramsach, Austria; Clay $10,000	Nicolas Reissig; 3–6, 7–6^{(7–3)}, 6–4	Christian Trubrig	Tristan-Samuel Weissborn; Bastian Trinker	Roman Jebavý; Marcel Waloch; Gibril Diarra; Matteo Donati
July 14	Austria F4 Futures; Kramsach, Austria; Clay $10,000	Roman Jebavý; Jan Šátral; 6–1, 7–5	František Polánka; Dominik Sochůrek	Tristan-Samuel Weissborn; Bastian Trinker	Roman Jebavý; Marcel Waloch; Gibril Diarra; Matteo Donati
July 14	Belgium F7 Futures; Westende–Middelkerke, Belgium; Hard $10,000	Niels Desein; 6–3, 3–6, 7–6^{(8–6)}	Steve Darcis	Antoine Hoang; Jules Marie	Ugo Nastasi; Juan Matías González Carrasco; Alban Meuffels; Alexandre Folie
July 14	Belgium F7 Futures; Westende–Middelkerke, Belgium; Hard $10,000	Hugo Nys; Élie Rousset; 6–3, 6–1	Éric Fomba; Florian Lakat	Antoine Hoang; Jules Marie	Ugo Nastasi; Juan Matías González Carrasco; Alban Meuffels; Alexandre Folie
July 14	Bulgaria F6 Futures; Blagoevgrad, Bulgaria; Clay $10,000	Mathias Bourgue; 6–1, 6–4	Maxime Hamou	Alexandar Lazov; Romain Arneodo	Grégoire Barrère; Alexander Zhurbin; Alexandros Jakupovic; Gleb Sakharov
July 14	Bulgaria F6 Futures; Blagoevgrad, Bulgaria; Clay $10,000	Alexandros Jakupovic; Alexander Zhurbin; 6–1, 3–6, [10–6]	Tzvetan Mihov; Andreas Neykov	Alexandar Lazov; Romain Arneodo	Grégoire Barrère; Alexander Zhurbin; Alexandros Jakupovic; Gleb Sakharov
July 14	Estonia F1 Futures; Tallinn, Estonia; Clay $10,000	Christian Lindell; 3–6, 6–2, 6–2	Markus Eriksson	Jürgen Zopp; Andrea Basso	Micke Kontinen; Aleksandr Vasilenko; Anton Zaitcev; Mārtiņš Podžus
July 14	Estonia F1 Futures; Tallinn, Estonia; Clay $10,000	Lukas Mugevičius; Aleksandr Vasilenko; 6–7^{(10–12)}, 6–3, [10–6]	Micke Kontinen; Andrew Whittington	Jürgen Zopp; Andrea Basso	Micke Kontinen; Aleksandr Vasilenko; Anton Zaitcev; Mārtiņš Podžus
July 14	Germany F8 Futures; Trier, Germany; Clay $10,000	Peter Torebko; 6–2, 6–4	Cristóbal Saavedra Corvalán	Jakub Lustyk; Nicolás Kicker	Leon Schutt; Lucas Gerch; Daniel Masur; Evgeny Korolev
July 14	Germany F8 Futures; Trier, Germany; Clay $10,000	Kevin Kaczynski; Petar Trendafilov; 6–4, 4–6, [10–8]	Franjo Raspudić; Salar Saraydarpour	Jakub Lustyk; Nicolás Kicker	Leon Schutt; Lucas Gerch; Daniel Masur; Evgeny Korolev
July 14	Hong Kong F2 Futures; Hong Kong; Hard $10,000	Ruan Roelofse; 6–4, 3–6, 2–0, ret.	Lee Duck-hee	Evan Song; Dayne Kelly	Kittipong Wachiramanowong; Arata Onozawa; Nam Hyun-woo; Sidharth Rawat
July 14	Hong Kong F2 Futures; Hong Kong; Hard $10,000	Arata Onozawa; Ruan Roelofse; 6–2, 4–6, [10–4]	Peter Kobelt; Devin McCarthy	Evan Song; Dayne Kelly	Kittipong Wachiramanowong; Arata Onozawa; Nam Hyun-woo; Sidharth Rawat
July 14	Romania F8 Futures; Curtea de Argeș, Romania; Clay $10,000	Filip Horanský; 6–4, 6–4	Dragoș Dima	Cătălin-Ionuț Gârd; Petru-Alexandru Luncanu	Claudio Fortuna; Juan Sebastián Gómez; Patrick Ciorcilă; Francesco Picco
July 14	Romania F8 Futures; Curtea de Argeș, Romania; Clay $10,000	Victor Vlad Cornea; Petru-Alexandru Luncanu; 6–2, 6–3	Bogdan Ionuț Apostol; Nicolae Frunză	Cătălin-Ionuț Gârd; Petru-Alexandru Luncanu	Claudio Fortuna; Juan Sebastián Gómez; Patrick Ciorcilă; Francesco Picco
July 14	Serbia F5 Futures; Belgrade, Serbia; Clay $10,000	Matej Sabanov; 6–0, 6–2	Juan Carlos Sáez	Laslo Djere; Denis Bejtulahi	Tomislav Jotovski; Dejan Katić; Marko Tepavac; Arsenije Zlatanović
July 14	Serbia F5 Futures; Belgrade, Serbia; Clay $10,000	Darko Jandrić; Miki Janković; 7–5, 4–6, [10–8]	Guillermo Rivera Aránguiz; Juan Carlos Sáez	Laslo Djere; Denis Bejtulahi	Tomislav Jotovski; Dejan Katić; Marko Tepavac; Arsenije Zlatanović
July 14	Slovakia F1 Futures; Tatranská Lomnica–Poprad, Slovakia; Clay $10,000	Marek Semjan; 6–2, 6–2	Rudolf Siwy	Adrian Partl; Robin Staněk	Péter Nagy; Václav Šafránek; Patrik Fabian; Pol Toledo Bagué
July 14	Slovakia F1 Futures; Tatranská Lomnica–Poprad, Slovakia; Clay $10,000	Patrik Fabian; Adrian Partl; 6–2, 6–0	Jan Kunčík; Lukáš Maršoun	Adrian Partl; Robin Staněk	Péter Nagy; Václav Šafránek; Patrik Fabian; Pol Toledo Bagué
July 14	Spain F18 Futures; Gandia, Spain; Clay $10,000	Arthur De Greef; 6–4, 4–6, 6–3	Ramkumar Ramanathan	Pedro Cachin; Ricardo Ojeda Lara	Álvaro López San Martín; François-Arthur Vibert; Miguel Semmler; Sergio Martos Gornés
July 14	Spain F18 Futures; Gandia, Spain; Clay $10,000	Juan Samuel Arauzo Martínez; Martin Beran; 2–6, 7–6^{(7–3)}, [11–9]	Ramkumar Ramanathan; Miguel Ángel Reyes-Varela	Pedro Cachin; Ricardo Ojeda Lara	Álvaro López San Martín; François-Arthur Vibert; Miguel Semmler; Sergio Martos Gornés
July 14	Turkey F25 Futures; Istanbul, Turkey; Hard $10,000	Aldin Šetkić; 6–2, 6–3	Nikala Scholtz	Cem İlkel; Issam Haitham Taweel	Edoardo Eremin; Sebastian Lavie; Darren Polkinghorne; Tucker Vorster
July 14	Turkey F25 Futures; Istanbul, Turkey; Hard $10,000	Nikala Scholtz; Tucker Vorster; 6–2, 6–4	Damian Farinola; Petr Michnev	Cem İlkel; Issam Haitham Taweel	Edoardo Eremin; Sebastian Lavie; Darren Polkinghorne; Tucker Vorster
July 14	USA F20 Futures; Joplin, United States; Hard $10,000	Mitchell Frank; 6–2, 6–1	Liam Broady	Andrew Harris; Sébastien Boltz	Spencer Papa; Quinton Vega; Luke Bambridge; Thai-Son Kwiatkowski
July 14	USA F20 Futures; Joplin, United States; Hard $10,000	Luke Bambridge; Liam Broady; 6–4, 5–2, ret.	Daniel Garza; Raúl Isaías Rosas Zarur	Andrew Harris; Sébastien Boltz	Spencer Papa; Quinton Vega; Luke Bambridge; Thai-Son Kwiatkowski
July 21	China F9 Futures; Zhangjiagang, China; Hard $15,000	Li Zhe; 6–2, 6–2	Nikola Milojević	Nam Ji-sung; Cho Min-hyeok	Takuto Niki; Lee Duck-hee; Kaichi Uchida; Kim Cheong-eui
July 21	China F9 Futures; Zhangjiagang, China; Hard $15,000	Cho Min-hyeok; Nam Ji-sung; 6–3, 6–4	Qiu Zhuoyang; Te Rigele	Nam Ji-sung; Cho Min-hyeok	Takuto Niki; Lee Duck-hee; Kaichi Uchida; Kim Cheong-eui
July 21	Denmark F1 Futures; Aarhus, Denmark; Clay $15,000	Christian Lindell; 6–2, ret.	Matteo Donati	Vladyslav Manafov; Simone Vagnozzi	Timon Reichelt; Søren Hess-Olesen; José Hernández; André Gaspar Murta
July 21	Denmark F1 Futures; Aarhus, Denmark; Clay $15,000	Matteo Donati; Simone Vagnozzi; 6–1, 6–0	Christian Lindell; Robin Olin	Vladyslav Manafov; Simone Vagnozzi	Timon Reichelt; Søren Hess-Olesen; José Hernández; André Gaspar Murta
July 21	Ireland F1 Futures; Dublin, Republic of Ireland; Carpet $15,000	Joshua Milton; 4–6, 7–5, 6–2	Edward Corrie	Sam Barry; Yannick Jankovits	Daniel Glancy; Frederik Nielsen; Jonny O'Mara; Adam Skalsky
July 21	Ireland F1 Futures; Dublin, Republic of Ireland; Carpet $15,000	Edward Corrie; Frederik Nielsen; 6–2, 7–5	Peter Bothwell; David O'Hare	Sam Barry; Yannick Jankovits	Daniel Glancy; Frederik Nielsen; Jonny O'Mara; Adam Skalsky
July 21	Italy F24 Futures; Fano, Italy; Clay $15,000+H	Jason Kubler; 6–1, 5–7, 6–3	Daniele Giorgini	Stefano Napolitano; Arthur De Greef	Matteo Trevisan; Federico Gaio; Omar Giacalone; Stefano Travaglia
July 21	Italy F24 Futures; Fano, Italy; Clay $15,000+H	Lorenzo Frigerio; Matteo Trevisan; 6–3, 6–2	Francesco Borgo; Marco Bortolotti	Stefano Napolitano; Arthur De Greef	Matteo Trevisan; Federico Gaio; Omar Giacalone; Stefano Travaglia
July 21	Venezuela F3 Futures; Maracaibo, Venezuela; Hard $15,000	Roberto Quiroz; 6–3, 6–4	Jorge Brian Panta	Mauricio Echazú; Henrique Cunha	Luis Patiño; Mateo Nicolás Martínez; Ryota Tanuma; Thales Turini
July 21	Venezuela F3 Futures; Maracaibo, Venezuela; Hard $15,000	Mateo Nicolás Martínez; Roberto Quiroz; 6–4, 1–1, ret.	Christopher Díaz Figueroa; Mauricio Echazú	Mauricio Echazú; Henrique Cunha	Luis Patiño; Mateo Nicolás Martínez; Ryota Tanuma; Thales Turini
July 21	Argentina F11 Futures; Resistencia, Argentina; Clay $10,000	Valentin Florez; 6–1, 3–6, 6–2	Felipe Mantilla	Eduardo Agustín Torre; Rodrigo Sánchez	Tomás Lipovšek Puches; Rodrigo Arús; Sebastián Exequiel Pini; Matías Zukas
July 21	Argentina F11 Futures; Resistencia, Argentina; Clay $10,000	Felipe Mantilla; Rodrigo Sánchez; 6–3, 6–4	Valentin Florez; Leandro Portmann	Eduardo Agustín Torre; Rodrigo Sánchez	Tomás Lipovšek Puches; Rodrigo Arús; Sebastián Exequiel Pini; Matías Zukas
July 21	Austria F5 Futures; Bad Waltersdorf, Austria; Clay $10,000	Dušan Lojda; 6–3, 5–7, 6–4	Karol Beck	Dennis Novak; Filip Horanský	Jan Blecha; Pirmin Hänle; Pavel Nejedlý; Lukas Jastraunig
July 21	Austria F5 Futures; Bad Waltersdorf, Austria; Clay $10,000	Jan Blecha; David Pel; 6–4, 6–1	Mario Haider-Maurer; Jan Poskocil	Dennis Novak; Filip Horanský	Jan Blecha; Pirmin Hänle; Pavel Nejedlý; Lukas Jastraunig
July 21	Belgium F8 Futures; Knokke-Heist, Belgium; Clay $10,000	Julien Cagnina; 6–2, 6–4	Olivier Rochus	Juan Carlos Sáez; Jonas Merckx	Clément Geens; Evgeny Karlovskiy; Dimitar Grabul; Matwé Middelkoop
July 21	Belgium F8 Futures; Knokke-Heist, Belgium; Clay $10,000	Julien Cagnina; Sander Gillé; 6–4, 7–5	Evgeny Karlovskiy; Tom Schönenberg	Juan Carlos Sáez; Jonas Merckx	Clément Geens; Evgeny Karlovskiy; Dimitar Grabul; Matwé Middelkoop
July 21	Estonia F2 Futures; Tallinn, Estonia; Clay $10,000	Vladimir Ivanov; 6–2, 7–6^{(12–10)}	Jānis Podžus	Karol Drzewiecki; Piotr Łomacki	Markus Kerner; Yan Sabanin; Aleksandr Vasilenko; Ivan Nedelko
July 21	Estonia F2 Futures; Tallinn, Estonia; Clay $10,000	Markus Kerner; Andrew Whittington; 6–3, 6–3	Vladimir Ivanov; Yan Sabanin	Karol Drzewiecki; Piotr Łomacki	Markus Kerner; Yan Sabanin; Aleksandr Vasilenko; Ivan Nedelko
July 21	France F16 Futures; Troyes, France; Clay $10,000	Maxime Hamou; 2–6, 7–6^{(7–3)}, 6–0	Laurent Rochette	Grégoire Jacq; Jules Marie	Enzo Couacaud; Florian Barth; Ronan Joncour; Sadio Doumbia
July 21	France F16 Futures; Troyes, France; Clay $10,000	Grégoire Jacq; Élie Rousset; 4–6, 6–4, [11–9]	Constantin Bélot; François-Arthur Vibert	Grégoire Jacq; Jules Marie	Enzo Couacaud; Florian Barth; Ronan Joncour; Sadio Doumbia
July 21	Germany F9 Futures; Essen, Germany; Clay $10,000	Peter Torebko; 6–2, 6–4	Marvin Netuschil	Yannik Reuter; Gavin van Peperzeel	Jeremy Jahn; Ricardo Urzúa Rivera; Cristóbal Saavedra Corvalán; Evgeny Korolev
July 21	Germany F9 Futures; Essen, Germany; Clay $10,000	Erik Elliott; Gavin van Peperzeel; 4–6, 7–6^{(8–6)}, [12–10]	Pablo Galdón; Nicolás Kicker	Yannik Reuter; Gavin van Peperzeel	Jeremy Jahn; Ricardo Urzúa Rivera; Cristóbal Saavedra Corvalán; Evgeny Korolev
July 21	Hong Kong F3 Futures; Hong Kong; Hard $10,000	Kento Takeuchi; 6–2, 4–1, ret.	Song Min-kyu	Nam Hyun-woo; Toshihide Matsui	Danai Udomchoke; Arata Onozawa; Chayanon Kaewsuto; Takashi Saito
July 21	Hong Kong F3 Futures; Hong Kong; Hard $10,000	Peter Kobelt; Devin McCarthy; 5–7, 6–3, [10–4]	Arata Onozawa; Ruan Roelofse	Nam Hyun-woo; Toshihide Matsui	Danai Udomchoke; Arata Onozawa; Chayanon Kaewsuto; Takashi Saito
July 21	Romania F9 Futures; Pitești, Romania; Clay $10,000	Mathias Bourgue; 6–1, 1–0, ret.	Claudio Fortuna	Duilio Beretta; Victor Vlad Cornea	Patrick Ciorcilă; Petru-Alexandru Luncanu; Giulio Torroni; Laurent Malouli
July 21	Romania F9 Futures; Pitești, Romania; Clay $10,000	Patrick Grigoriu; Costin Pavăl; 5–7, 6–4, [10–6]	Victor Vlad Cornea; Petru-Alexandru Luncanu	Duilio Beretta; Victor Vlad Cornea	Patrick Ciorcilă; Petru-Alexandru Luncanu; Giulio Torroni; Laurent Malouli
July 21	Serbia F6 Futures; Valjevo, Serbia; Clay $10,000	Maxime Janvier; 7–6^{(7–4)}, 7–6^{(8–6)}	Tomislav Jotovski	Bogdan Đurđević; Arsenije Zlatanović	Miki Janković; Strahinja Rakić; Dejan Katić; Davide Melchiorre
July 21	Serbia F6 Futures; Valjevo, Serbia; Clay $10,000	Levente Gödry; Péter Nagy; 3–6, 6–4, [10–8]	Ljubomir Čelebić; Davide Melchiorre	Bogdan Đurđević; Arsenije Zlatanović	Miki Janković; Strahinja Rakić; Dejan Katić; Davide Melchiorre
July 21	Slovakia F2 Futures; Michalovce, Slovakia; Clay $10,000	Kamil Majchrzak; 6–2, 6–3	Filip Brtnický	Marek Semjan; Michal Pažický	Adrian Partl; Jack Carpenter; Patrik Fabian; Riccardo Maiga
July 21	Slovakia F2 Futures; Michalovce, Slovakia; Clay $10,000	Lukáš Maršoun; Robert Rumler; 6–3, 6–2	Miroslav Kleman; Ladislav Zelený	Marek Semjan; Michal Pažický	Adrian Partl; Jack Carpenter; Patrik Fabian; Riccardo Maiga
July 21	Spain F19 Futures; Dénia, Spain; Clay $10,000	Pedro Cachin; 6–4, 3–6, 6–4	Maverick Banes	Ricardo Ojeda Lara; David Vega Hernández	Bernabé Zapata Miralles; Thomas Giraudeau; Sergio Gutiérrez Ferrol; Sergio Martos Gornés
July 21	Spain F19 Futures; Dénia, Spain; Clay $10,000	Maverick Banes; Jake Eames; Walkover	Juan Samuel Arauzo Martínez; David Vega Hernández	Ricardo Ojeda Lara; David Vega Hernández	Bernabé Zapata Miralles; Thomas Giraudeau; Sergio Gutiérrez Ferrol; Sergio Martos Gornés
July 21	USA F21 Futures; Godfrey, United States; Hard $10,000	Daniel Nguyen; 3–6, 6–2, 7–6^{(7–2)}	Mitchell Frank	Ronnie Schneider; Luke Bambridge	Fares Ghasya; Spencer Papa; Jeff Dadamo; Toby Martin
July 21	USA F21 Futures; Godfrey, United States; Hard $10,000	Luke Bambridge; Liam Broady; 6–3, 6–2	Brett Clark; Ronnie Schneider	Ronnie Schneider; Luke Bambridge	Fares Ghasya; Spencer Papa; Jeff Dadamo; Toby Martin
July 28	Denmark F2 Futures; Copenhagen, Denmark; Clay $15,000	Martin Pedersen; 4–6, 7–6^{(7–4)}, 6–3	Patrik Rosenholm	Matteo Donati; Fabiano de Paula	Tobias Blomgren; Isak Arvidsson; Nico Matic; Edward Corrie
July 28	Denmark F2 Futures; Copenhagen, Denmark; Clay $15,000	Isak Arvidsson; Thomas Kromann; 7–5, 7–6^{(7–2)}	Sander Arends; Niels Lootsma	Matteo Donati; Fabiano de Paula	Tobias Blomgren; Isak Arvidsson; Nico Matic; Edward Corrie
July 28	Kazakhstan F10 Futures; Astana, Kazakhstan; Hard $15,000	Denys Molchanov; 6–3, 6–4	Chen Ti	Dzmitry Zhyrmont; Huang Liang-chi	Karen Khachanov; Andrei Vasilevski; Denis Matsukevich; Sriram Balaji
July 28	Kazakhstan F10 Futures; Astana, Kazakhstan; Hard $15,000	Sriram Balaji; Ranjeet Virali-Murugesan; 6–2, 6–4	Huang Liang-chi; Denis Matsukevich	Dzmitry Zhyrmont; Huang Liang-chi	Karen Khachanov; Andrei Vasilevski; Denis Matsukevich; Sriram Balaji
July 28	Romania F10 Futures; Cluj-Napoca, Romania; Clay $15,000	Victor Crivoi; 6–7^{(5–7)}, 6–3, 6–4	Peter Torebko	Laslo Djere; Nicola Ghedin	Dragoș Constantin Ignat; Enzo Couacaud; Luca George Tatomir; Mathias Bourgue
July 28	Romania F10 Futures; Cluj-Napoca, Romania; Clay $15,000	Ilie-Aurelian Giurgiu; Alexandru Jecan; 7–5, 3–6, [10–7]	Patrick Grigoriu; Costin Pavăl	Laslo Djere; Nicola Ghedin	Dragoș Constantin Ignat; Enzo Couacaud; Luca George Tatomir; Mathias Bourgue
July 28	Argentina F12 Futures; Corrientes, Argentina; Clay $10,000	Martín Cuevas; 7–6^{(7–5)}, 6–4	Juan Ignacio Ameal	Tomás Lipovšek Puches; Joaquin Jesús Monteferrario	Felipe Mantilla; Eduardo Agustín Torre; Rodrigo Sánchez; Facuno Manzanares
July 28	Argentina F12 Futures; Corrientes, Argentina; Clay $10,000	Tomás Lipovšek Puches; Ryūsei Makiguchi; 4–6, 6–3, [10–5]	Federico Coria; Juan Ignacio Galarza	Tomás Lipovšek Puches; Joaquin Jesús Monteferrario	Felipe Mantilla; Eduardo Agustín Torre; Rodrigo Sánchez; Facuno Manzanares
July 28	Belgium F9 Futures; Ostend, Belgium; Clay $10,000	Constant Lestienne; 6–4, 6–2	Alexandre Sidorenko	Alexandre Folie; Olivier Rochus	Stieg Martens; Ugo Nastasi; Antoine Hoang; Alban Meuffels
July 28	Belgium F9 Futures; Ostend, Belgium; Clay $10,000	Scott Griekspoor; Alban Meuffels; 6–2, 6–4	Sander Gillé; Antoine Hoang	Alexandre Folie; Olivier Rochus	Stieg Martens; Ugo Nastasi; Antoine Hoang; Alban Meuffels
July 28	Georgia F1 Futures; Telavi, Georgia; Clay $10,000	Florent Diep; 6–1, retired	Riccardo Sinicropi	Daniil Medvedev; Matija Pecotić	Cristóbal Saavedra Corvalán; Riccardo Bonadio; Paweł Ciaś; Issam Haitham Taweel
July 28	Georgia F1 Futures; Telavi, Georgia; Clay $10,000	Florent Diep; Daniil Medvedev; 6–1, 4–6, [10–3]	Emanuele Molina; Riccardo Sinicropi	Daniil Medvedev; Matija Pecotić	Cristóbal Saavedra Corvalán; Riccardo Bonadio; Paweł Ciaś; Issam Haitham Taweel
July 28	Germany F10 Futures; Wetzlar, Germany; Clay $10,000	Evgeny Korolev; 6–0, 0–6, 6–3	Julian Lenz	Tom Schönenberg; Simone Vagnozzi	Marcin Gawron; Florian Fallert; Jan Choinski; Jannis Kahlke
July 28	Germany F10 Futures; Wetzlar, Germany; Clay $10,000	David Pel; Dennis van Scheppingen; 7–6^{(7–2)}, 7–6^{(7–5)}	Julian Lenz; Lars Pörschke	Tom Schönenberg; Simone Vagnozzi	Marcin Gawron; Florian Fallert; Jan Choinski; Jannis Kahlke
July 28	Italy F25 Futures; Pontedera, Italy; Clay $10,000	Matteo Trevisan; 6–2, 6–1	Francesco Picco	Daniel Dutra da Silva; Matteo Fago	Daniele Capecchi; Jonathan Kanar; Lorenzo Sonego; Leonardo Azzaro
July 28	Italy F25 Futures; Pontedera, Italy; Clay $10,000	Daniel Dutra da Silva; Matteo Volante; 6–4, 6–3	Matteo Fago; Manuel Mazzella	Daniel Dutra da Silva; Matteo Fago	Daniele Capecchi; Jonathan Kanar; Lorenzo Sonego; Leonardo Azzaro
July 28	Lithuania F1 Futures; Vilnius, Lithuania; Clay $10,000	Maxim Dubarenco; 6–1, 6–4	Lukas Mugevičius	Maxime Hamou; François-Arthur Vibert	Piotr Łomacki; Peter Kobelt; Jérôme Inzerillo; Ronald Slobodchikov
July 28	Lithuania F1 Futures; Vilnius, Lithuania; Clay $10,000	Maxim Dubarenco; Peter Kobelt; 4–6, 7–6^{(7–2)}, [10–8]	Marat Deviatiarov; Jérôme Inzerillo	Maxime Hamou; François-Arthur Vibert	Piotr Łomacki; Peter Kobelt; Jérôme Inzerillo; Ronald Slobodchikov
July 28	Russia F5 Futures; Kazan, Russia; Clay $10,000	Anton Zaitcev; 6–3, 6–4	Roman Safiullin	Richard Muzaev; Vladimir Ivanov	Yan Sabanin; Alexander Perfilov; Alexandr Kushakov; Gleb Alekseenko
July 28	Russia F5 Futures; Kazan, Russia; Clay $10,000	Ilia Shatskiy; Alexander Zhurbin; 7–5, 6–1	Marin Bradarić; Roman Safiullin	Richard Muzaev; Vladimir Ivanov	Yan Sabanin; Alexander Perfilov; Alexandr Kushakov; Gleb Alekseenko
July 28	Serbia F7 Futures; Sombor, Serbia; Clay $10,000	Marko Tepavac; 6–3, 7–6^{(7–5)}	Miljan Zekić	Tomislav Jotovski; Gavin van Peperzeel	Alexis Musialek; Dejan Katić; Ilija Vučić; Matej Sabanov
July 28	Serbia F7 Futures; Sombor, Serbia; Clay $10,000	Ivan Sabanov; Matej Sabanov; 7–6^{(7–5)}, 6–1	Alexis Musialek; Gavin van Peperzeel	Tomislav Jotovski; Gavin van Peperzeel	Alexis Musialek; Dejan Katić; Ilija Vučić; Matej Sabanov
July 28	Slovakia F3 Futures; Piešťany, Slovakia; Clay $10,000	Karol Beck; 6–4, 7–6^{(7–4)}	Ivo Klec	Filip Horanský; Mike Urbanija	Ivan Košec; Dominik Šproch; Marko Daniš; Marek Semjan
July 28	Slovakia F3 Futures; Piešťany, Slovakia; Clay $10,000	Karol Beck; Filipp Kekercheni; 6–2, 2–6, [10–8]	Danylo Kalenichenko; Gonçalo Oliveira	Filip Horanský; Mike Urbanija	Ivan Košec; Dominik Šproch; Marko Daniš; Marek Semjan
July 28	Spain F20 Futures; Xàtiva, Spain; Clay $10,000	Oriol Roca Batalla; 6–2, 6–2	Maverick Banes	Thomas Giraudeau; Ricardo Ojeda Lara	Eduard Esteve Lobato; Vasco Mensurado; João Domingues; Álvaro López San Martín
July 28	Spain F20 Futures; Xàtiva, Spain; Clay $10,000	Eduard Eseteve Lobato; Oriol Roca Batalla; 6–0, 7–6^{(8–6)}	Ferran Calvo Eman; Dennis Uspensky	Thomas Giraudeau; Ricardo Ojeda Lara	Eduard Esteve Lobato; Vasco Mensurado; João Domingues; Álvaro López San Martín
July 28	USA F22 Futures; Decatur, United States; Hard $10,000	Bjorn Fratangelo; 6–4, 6–0	Liam Broady	Andrew Harris; Luke Bambridge	Sébastien Boltz; Marcelo Arévalo; Eric Quigley; Daniel Nguyen
July 28	USA F22 Futures; Decatur, United States; Hard $10,000	Luke Bambridge; Liam Broady; 5–7, 6–2, [10–7]	Scott Clayton; Toby Martin	Andrew Harris; Luke Bambridge	Sébastien Boltz; Marcelo Arévalo; Eric Quigley; Daniel Nguyen

=== August ===
Week of	Tournament	Winner	Runners-up	Semifinalists	Quarterfinalists
August 4	Italy F26 Futures; Bolzano, Italy; Clay $15,000	Guillaume Rufin; 6–4, 2–6, 6–2	Thomas Holzer	Maximilian Neuchrist; Erik Crepaldi	Maxime Teixeira; Lorenzo Frigerio; Patrick Prader; Francesco Vilardo
August 4	Italy F26 Futures; Bolzano, Italy; Clay $15,000	Guillaume Rufin; Maxime Teixeira; 7–6^{(7–3)}, 6–1	Thomas Holzer; Patrick Pradera	Maximilian Neuchrist; Erik Crepaldi	Maxime Teixeira; Lorenzo Frigerio; Patrick Prader; Francesco Vilardo
August 4	Kazakhstan F11 Futures; Astana, Kazakhstan; Hard $15,000	Sriram Balaji; 6–3, 6–2	Huang Liang-chi	Denys Molchanov; Dzmitry Zhyrmont	Karen Khachanov; Andrey Rublev; Timur Khabibulin; Chen Ti
August 4	Kazakhstan F11 Futures; Astana, Kazakhstan; Hard $15,000	Chen Ti; Denis Matsukevich; 6–2, 6–3	Sriram Balaji; Ranjeet Virali-Murugesan	Denys Molchanov; Dzmitry Zhyrmont	Karen Khachanov; Andrey Rublev; Timur Khabibulin; Chen Ti
August 4	Argentina F13 Futures; Misiones, Argentina; Clay $10,000+H	Nicolás Kicker; 6–1, 6–2	João Pedro Sorgi	Juan Ignacio Ameal; Gaston Arturo Grimolizzi	Eduardo Agustín Torre; Juan Pablo Paz; Martín Cuevas; Federico Coria
August 4	Argentina F13 Futures; Misiones, Argentina; Clay $10,000+H	Valentin Florez; Leandro Portmann; 6–4, 6–2	Nicolás Kicker; Bruno Sant'Anna	Juan Ignacio Ameal; Gaston Arturo Grimolizzi	Eduardo Agustín Torre; Juan Pablo Paz; Martín Cuevas; Federico Coria
August 4	Austria F6 Futures; Wels, Austria; Clay $10,000	Dennis Novak; 6–4, 1–6, 6–3	Peter Heller	Patrick Ofner; Duilio Beretta	Riccardo Bellotti; Pascal Brunner; Michal Konečný; Marco Bortolotti
August 4	Austria F6 Futures; Wels, Austria; Clay $10,000	Pascal Brunner; Dennis Novak; 6–4, 6–3	Kirill Dmitriev; Dmitry Popko	Patrick Ofner; Duilio Beretta	Riccardo Bellotti; Pascal Brunner; Michal Konečný; Marco Bortolotti
August 4	Belgium F10 Futures; Eupen, Belgium; Clay $10,000	Steve Darcis; 6–1, 6–2	Richard Becker	Julien Cagnina; Mats Moraing	Kimmer Coppejans; Maverick Banes; David Pérez Sanz; Samuel Bensoussan
August 4	Belgium F10 Futures; Eupen, Belgium; Clay $10,000	Bobbie de Goeijen; Scott Griekspoor; 1–6, 6–4, [10–4]	David Pérez Sanz; Leon Schutt	Julien Cagnina; Mats Moraing	Kimmer Coppejans; Maverick Banes; David Pérez Sanz; Samuel Bensoussan
August 4	Ecuador F1 Futures; Guayaquil, Ecuador; Clay $10,000	Gonzalo Escobar; 6–4, 1–6, 6–3	Roberto Quiroz	Rodrigo Sánchez; Bastián Malla	Gabriel Alejandro Hidalgo; Daniel Elahi Galán; Jean-Yves Aubone; Roberto Cid
August 4	Ecuador F1 Futures; Guayaquil, Ecuador; Clay $10,000	Jean-Yves Aubone; Gonzalo Escobar; 7–6^{(8–6)}, 6–2	Iván Endara; Caio Silva	Rodrigo Sánchez; Bastián Malla	Gabriel Alejandro Hidalgo; Daniel Elahi Galán; Jean-Yves Aubone; Roberto Cid
August 4	Finland F1 Futures; Vierumäki, Finland; Clay $10,000	Micke Kontinen; 3–6, 7–6^{(7–2)}, 7–5	Aleksandr Vasilenko	Maxime Tabatruong; Henrik Sillanpää	Alexis Musialek; Juho Paukku; Romain Arneodo; Peter Kobelt
August 4	Finland F1 Futures; Vierumäki, Finland; Clay $10,000	Pietro Licciardi; Federico Maccari; 7–5, 7–6^{(7–4)}	Florian Barth; William Boe-Wiegaard	Maxime Tabatruong; Henrik Sillanpää	Alexis Musialek; Juho Paukku; Romain Arneodo; Peter Kobelt
August 4	Georgia F2 Futures; Telavi, Georgia; Clay $10,000	Daniil Medvedev; 3–6, 6–2, 6–2	Gianluca Mager	Cristóbal Saavedra Corvalán; George Tsivadze	Riccardo Sinicropi; Aleksandre Metreveli; Grégoire Barrère; Issam Haitham Taweel
August 4	Georgia F2 Futures; Telavi, Georgia; Clay $10,000	Grégoire Barrère; Luca Margaroli; 7–6^{(7–5)}, 7–6^{(7–5)}	Riccardo Bonadio; Gianluca Mager	Cristóbal Saavedra Corvalán; George Tsivadze	Riccardo Sinicropi; Aleksandre Metreveli; Grégoire Barrère; Issam Haitham Taweel
August 4	Germany F11 Futures; Friedberg, Germany; Clay $10,000	Hans Podlipnik Castillo; 6–4, 6–2	Rémi Boutillier	Yannick Maden; Michal Schmid	Bastian Wagner; Lukas Finzelberg; Kevin Krawietz; Evgeny Korolev
August 4	Germany F11 Futures; Friedberg, Germany; Clay $10,000	Florian Fallert; Sebastian Sachs; 7–6^{(8–6)}, 7–6^{(9–7)}	Kevin Krawietz; Hannes Wagner	Yannick Maden; Michal Schmid	Bastian Wagner; Lukas Finzelberg; Kevin Krawietz; Evgeny Korolev
August 4	Latvia F1 Futures; Jūrmala, Latvia; Clay $10,000	Oriol Roca Batalla; 6–4, 6–4	Bastian Trinker	Maxim Dubarenco; Jules Marie	Francesco Garzelli; François-Arthur Vibert; Marc García Román; Marat Deviatiarov
August 4	Latvia F1 Futures; Jūrmala, Latvia; Clay $10,000	Dariusz Lipka; Adam Majchrowicz; 4–6, 7–5, [10–4]	Rihards Emuliņš; Krišjānis Stabiņš	Maxim Dubarenco; Jules Marie	Francesco Garzelli; François-Arthur Vibert; Marc García Román; Marat Deviatiarov
August 4	Russia F6 Futures; Kazan, Russia; Clay $10,000	Roman Safiullin; 6–1, 4–6, 6–1	Richard Muzaev	Alexander Zhurbin; Alexander Bublik	Anton Zaitcev; Gleb Alekseenko; Vladimir Ivanov; Victor Baluda
August 4	Russia F6 Futures; Kazan, Russia; Clay $10,000	Andrei Levine; Anton Zaitcev; 6–1, 6–3	Alexander Bublik; Roman Safiullin	Alexander Zhurbin; Alexander Bublik	Anton Zaitcev; Gleb Alekseenko; Vladimir Ivanov; Victor Baluda
August 4	Serbia F8 Futures; Novi Sad, Serbia; Clay $10,000	Gavin van Peperzeel; 6–0, 7–6^{(7–2)}	Antonio Šančić	Dino Marcan; Ilija Vučić	Ljubomir Čelebić; Ivan Bjelica; Alexandre Massa; Miljan Zekić
August 4	Serbia F8 Futures; Novi Sad, Serbia; Clay $10,000	Ljubomir Čelebić; Davide Melchiorre; 6–4, 4–6, [10–5]	Dino Marcan; Antonio Šančić	Dino Marcan; Ilija Vučić	Ljubomir Čelebić; Ivan Bjelica; Alexandre Massa; Miljan Zekić
August 4	Slovakia F4 Futures; Trnava, Slovakia; Clay $10,000	Jan Šátral; 6–4, 7–6^{(7–5)}	Václav Šafránek	Pavel Nejedlý; Karol Beck	Ivan Košec; Michal Milko; Juraj Masár; Kamil Čapkovič
August 4	Slovakia F4 Futures; Trnava, Slovakia; Clay $10,000	Jakub Filipský; Jan Šátral; 6–3, 6–2	Karol Beck; Filipp Kekercheni	Pavel Nejedlý; Karol Beck	Ivan Košec; Michal Milko; Juraj Masár; Kamil Čapkovič
August 4	Spain F21 Futures; Béjar, Spain; Hard $10,000+H	Brydan Klein; 6–3, 6–3	Frederico Ferreira Silva	Miguel Semmler; Jaime Pulgar García	Wang Chuhan; Yannick Jankovits; Dane Propoggia; Eduardo Struvay
August 4	Spain F21 Futures; Béjar, Spain; Hard $10,000+H	Brydan Klein; Dane Propoggia; 6–1, 7–6^{(7–3)}	Iván Arenas Gualda; Jaime Pulgar García	Miguel Semmler; Jaime Pulgar García	Wang Chuhan; Yannick Jankovits; Dane Propoggia; Eduardo Struvay
August 4	USA F23 Futures; Edwardsville, United States; Hard $10,000	Mitchell Frank; 7–6^{(7–5)}, 6–2	Yuki Bhambri	Martin Redlicki; Liam Broady	Marcelo Arévalo; Vullnet Tashi; Bjorn Fratangelo; Jeff Dadamo
August 4	USA F23 Futures; Edwardsville, United States; Hard $10,000	Patrick Davidson; Saketh Myneni; 6–3, 6–4	Bjorn Fratangelo; Mitchell Krueger	Martin Redlicki; Liam Broady	Marcelo Arévalo; Vullnet Tashi; Bjorn Fratangelo; Jeff Dadamo
August 11	Belarus F1 Futures; Minsk, Belarus; Clay $15,000	Dzmitry Zhyrmont; 7–6^{(7–4)}, 1–6, 6–0	Dane Propoggia	Eduardo Struvay; Ilya Ivashka	Denis Matsukevich; Stanislav Poplavskyy; Maxim Dubarenco; Artur Dubinski
August 11	Belarus F1 Futures; Minsk, Belarus; Clay $15,000	Siarhei Betau; Aliaksandr Bury; 7–6^{(7–0)}, 7–6^{(7–5)}	Hugo Nys; Dane Propoggia	Eduardo Struvay; Ilya Ivashka	Denis Matsukevich; Stanislav Poplavskyy; Maxim Dubarenco; Artur Dubinski
August 11	Brazil F7 Futures; São José do Rio Preto, Brazil; Clay $15,000	Jorge Aguilar; 3–6, 6–3, 7–5	Henrique Cunha	Bruno Sant'Anna; Daniel Dutra da Silva	João Menezes; Nicolas Santos; Pedro Sakamoto; André Miele
August 11	Brazil F7 Futures; São José do Rio Preto, Brazil; Clay $15,000	Rafael Matos; Fabrício Neis; 5–7, 6–1, [10–6]	Jorge Aguilar; Nicolás Jarry	Bruno Sant'Anna; Daniel Dutra da Silva	João Menezes; Nicolas Santos; Pedro Sakamoto; André Miele
August 11	Canada F7 Futures; Calgary, Canada; Hard $15,000	Daniel Nguyen; 7–6^{(9–7)}, 5–7, 6–4	Bjorn Fratangelo	Thai-Son Kwiatkowski; Omar Jasika	Alexander Sarkissian; Dennis Nevolo; Philip Bester; Frederik Nielsen
August 11	Canada F7 Futures; Calgary, Canada; Hard $15,000	Jack Murray; Brayden Schnur; 6–4, 3–6, [10–7]	Dimitar Kutrovsky; Dennis Nevolo	Thai-Son Kwiatkowski; Omar Jasika	Alexander Sarkissian; Dennis Nevolo; Philip Bester; Frederik Nielsen
August 11	Italy F27 Futures; Appiano Gentile, Italy; Clay $15,000+H	Tomislav Brkić; 7–6^{(7–3)}, 7–6^{(10–8)}	Daniele Giorgini	Marc Rath; Pedro Cachin	Nicola Ghedin; Yannik Reuter; Matteo Donati; Matteo Trevisan
August 11	Italy F27 Futures; Appiano Gentile, Italy; Clay $15,000+H	Mirza Bašić; Tomislav Brkić; 6–3, 6–4	Yannik Reuter; Maxime Teixeira	Marc Rath; Pedro Cachin	Nicola Ghedin; Yannik Reuter; Matteo Donati; Matteo Trevisan
August 11	Romania F11 Futures; Iași, Romania; Clay $15,000	Darian King; 7–6^{(8–6)}, 6–0	Filip Horanský	Dragoș Dima; Péter Nagy	Victor Vlad Cornea; Vadim Alekseenko; Vasile Antonescu; Bogdan Ionuț Apostol
August 11	Romania F11 Futures; Iași, Romania; Clay $15,000	Patrick Grigoriu; Costin Pavăl; 6–0, 6–3	Vasile Antonescu; Dragoș Dima	Dragoș Dima; Péter Nagy	Victor Vlad Cornea; Vadim Alekseenko; Vasile Antonescu; Bogdan Ionuț Apostol
August 11	Austria F7 Futures; Innsbruck, Austria; Clay $10,000	Dennis Novak; 6–3, 6–2	Bastian Trinker	Francesco Picco; Andrea Basso	Dmitry Popko; Gonçalo Oliveira; Jan Kunčík; Kirill Dmitriev
August 11	Austria F7 Futures; Innsbruck, Austria; Clay $10,000	Mohammad Al-Ghareeb; Abdullah Maqdes; 6–0, 6–3	Andrea Basso; Alessandro Ceppellini	Francesco Picco; Andrea Basso	Dmitry Popko; Gonçalo Oliveira; Jan Kunčík; Kirill Dmitriev
August 11	Belgium F11 Futures; Koksijde, Belgium; Clay $10,000	Julien Cagnina; 2–6, 7–6^{(7–1)}, 6–3	Scott Griekspoor	David Pérez Sanz; Maverick Banes	Jonas Merckx; Mats Moraing; Dimitar Grabul; Alban Meuffels
August 11	Belgium F11 Futures; Koksijde, Belgium; Clay $10,000	Sander Gillé; Joran Vliegen; 3–6, 6–3, [12–10]	Jake Eames; David Pérez Sanz	David Pérez Sanz; Maverick Banes	Jonas Merckx; Mats Moraing; Dimitar Grabul; Alban Meuffels
August 11	Ecuador F2 Futures; Guayaquil, Ecuador; Clay $10,000	Gonzalo Escobar; 6–3, 7–5	Iván Endara	Caio Silva; Roberto Quiroz	Alejandro Gómez; Alan Kohen; Bastián Malla; Connor Smith
August 11	Ecuador F2 Futures; Guayaquil, Ecuador; Clay $10,000	Diego Hidalgo; Roberto Quiroz; 7–5, 6–7^{(2–7)}, [10–8]	Gabriel Alejandro Hidalgo; Caio Silva	Caio Silva; Roberto Quiroz	Alejandro Gómez; Alan Kohen; Bastián Malla; Connor Smith
August 11	Finland F2 Futures; Hyvinkää, Finland; Clay $10,000	Henrik Sillanpää; 6–4, 4–6, 6–2	Romain Arneodo	Aleksandr Vasilenko; Micke Kontinen	Patrik Rosenholm; Vladimir Ivanov; Christoffer Solberg; Pietro Licciardi
August 11	Finland F2 Futures; Hyvinkää, Finland; Clay $10,000	Jesper Brunström; Patrik Rosenholm; 6–2, 6–3	Paul Cayré; Fabien Reboul	Aleksandr Vasilenko; Micke Kontinen	Patrik Rosenholm; Vladimir Ivanov; Christoffer Solberg; Pietro Licciardi
August 11	Georgia F3 Futures; Telavi, Georgia; Clay $10,000	Gianluca Mager; 2–4, ret.	Cristóbal Saavedra Corvalán	Evgenii Tiurnev; Daniil Medvedev	Arkadiusz Kocyła; Paweł Ciaś; Aleksandre Bakshi; Grégoire Barrère
August 11	Georgia F3 Futures; Telavi, Georgia; Clay $10,000	Grégoire Barrère; Luca Margaroli; 6–1, 6–1	Niko Muradashvili; Evgenii Tiurnev	Evgenii Tiurnev; Daniil Medvedev	Arkadiusz Kocyła; Paweł Ciaś; Aleksandre Bakshi; Grégoire Barrère
August 11	Germany F12 Futures; Karlsruhe, Germany; Clay $10,000	Yannick Hanfmann; 7–5, 6–1	Jan Choinski	Laslo Urrutia Fuentes; Johannes Härteis	Jannis Kahlke; Yannick Maden; Marko Lenz; Marek Jaloviec
August 11	Germany F12 Futures; Karlsruhe, Germany; Clay $10,000	Dominique Maden; Yannick Maden; 6–3, 6–1	Adrian Obert; Paul Wörner	Laslo Urrutia Fuentes; Johannes Härteis	Jannis Kahlke; Yannick Maden; Marko Lenz; Marek Jaloviec
August 11	Korea F10 Futures; Chuncheon, South Korea; Hard $10,000	John Millman; 6–3, 6–7^{(4–7)}, 7–6^{(7–5)}	Jose Rubin Statham	Kang Ku-keon; Choi Dong-whee	Toshihide Matsui; Yusuke Watanuki; Kento Takeuchi; Yuuya Kibi
August 11	Korea F10 Futures; Chuncheon, South Korea; Hard $10,000	Kaichi Uchida; Yusuke Watanuki; 6–3, 6–2	Kim Jae-hwan; Lee Jea-moon	Kang Ku-keon; Choi Dong-whee	Toshihide Matsui; Yusuke Watanuki; Kento Takeuchi; Yuuya Kibi
August 11	Russia F7 Futures; Kazan, Russia; Hard $10,000	Victor Baluda; 6–2, 6–1	Tal Goldengoren	Aslan Karatsev; Mikhail Fufygin	Alexander Boborykin; Richard Muzaev; Evgeny Karlovskiy; Vladimir Polyakov
August 11	Russia F7 Futures; Kazan, Russia; Hard $10,000	Victor Baluda; Evgeny Karlovskiy; 7–6^{(8–6)}, 6–3	Andrey Saveliev; Mikhail Vaks	Aslan Karatsev; Mikhail Fufygin	Alexander Boborykin; Richard Muzaev; Evgeny Karlovskiy; Vladimir Polyakov
August 11	Serbia F9 Futures; Novi Sad, Serbia; Clay $10,000	Jules Marie; 6–2, 4–6, 6–3	Dino Marcan	Danilo Petrović; Gleb Sakharov	Ilija Vučić; Cedrick Commin; Calum Puttergill; Arsenije Zlatanović
August 11	Serbia F9 Futures; Novi Sad, Serbia; Clay $10,000	Danilo Petrović; Ilija Vučić; 6–4, 6–3	Ivan Sabanov; Matej Sabanov	Danilo Petrović; Gleb Sakharov	Ilija Vučić; Cedrick Commin; Calum Puttergill; Arsenije Zlatanović
August 11	Spain F22 Futures; Ourense, Spain; Hard $10,000	Roberto Ortega Olmedo; 6–3, 6–2	Antoine Escoffier	Yannick Jankovits; Iván Arenas Gualda	Milos Sekulic; Jaime Pulgar García; Juan Samuel Arauzo Martínez; Hugo Grenier
August 11	Spain F22 Futures; Ourense, Spain; Hard $10,000	Iván Arenas Gualda; Ricardo Villacorta Alonso; 7–6^{(7–3)}, 3–6, [10–7]	Liu Siyu; Wang Chuhan	Yannick Jankovits; Iván Arenas Gualda	Milos Sekulic; Jaime Pulgar García; Juan Samuel Arauzo Martínez; Hugo Grenier
August 11	Switzerland F3 Futures; Geneva, Switzerland; Hard $10,000	Alexandar Lazov; 6–0, 6–1	Michal Schmid	Calvin Hemery; Maxime Hamou	Peter Heller; Jérôme Inzerillo; Maximiliano Estévez; Jordan Ubiergo
August 11	Switzerland F3 Futures; Geneva, Switzerland; Hard $10,000	Joss Espasandin; Jorge Montero; 6–3, 6–3	Luca Castelnuovo; Johan Nikles	Calvin Hemery; Maxime Hamou	Peter Heller; Jérôme Inzerillo; Maximiliano Estévez; Jordan Ubiergo
August 11	Turkey F27 Futures; Ankara, Turkey; Clay $10,000	Nikola Milojević; 7–5, 7–5	Gavin van Peperzeel	Luke Immanuel Harvey; Ruan Roelofse	Ronald Slobodchikov; Maxime Forcin; Tuna Altuna; Barkin Yalcinkale
August 11	Turkey F27 Futures; Ankara, Turkey; Clay $10,000	Ruan Roelofse; Gavin van Peperzeel; 6–1, 6–1	Tuna Altuna; Anıl Yüksel	Luke Immanuel Harvey; Ruan Roelofse	Ronald Slobodchikov; Maxime Forcin; Tuna Altuna; Barkin Yalcinkale
August 18	Belarus F2 Futures; Minsk, Belarus; Hard $15,000	Dzmitry Zhyrmont; 6–1, 6–4	Dane Propoggia	Yaraslav Shyla; Artur Dubinski	Ilya Ivashka; Volodymyr Uzhylovskyi; Ivan Liutarevich; Daniel Glancy
August 18	Belarus F2 Futures; Minsk, Belarus; Hard $15,000	Siarhei Betau; Aliaksandr Bury; 6–3, 7–5	Hugo Nys; Dane Propoggia	Yaraslav Shyla; Artur Dubinski	Ilya Ivashka; Volodymyr Uzhylovskyi; Ivan Liutarevich; Daniel Glancy
August 18	Brazil F8 Futures; São José do Rio Preto, Brazil; Clay $15,000	André Miele; 6–2, 6–4	Bruno Sant'Anna	Pedro Sakamoto; Jorge Aguilar	Tiago Lopes; Henrique Cunha; Fernando Romboli; Ricardo Hocevar
August 18	Brazil F8 Futures; São José do Rio Preto, Brazil; Clay $15,000	André Miele; Alexandre Tsuchiya; 6–3, 6–7^{(3–7)}, [10–6]	Pedro Sakamoto; João Pedro Sorgi	Pedro Sakamoto; Jorge Aguilar	Tiago Lopes; Henrique Cunha; Fernando Romboli; Ricardo Hocevar
August 18	Canada F8 Futures; Winnipeg, Canada; Hard $15,000	Liam Broady; 6–3, 6–4	Blake Mott	Jordan Thompson; Philip Bester	Marcus Daniell; Mitchell Krueger; Dimitar Kutrovsky; Dennis Novikov
August 18	Canada F8 Futures; Winnipeg, Canada; Hard $15,000	Dimitar Kutrovsky; Saketh Myneni; 7–5, 7–5	Philip Bester; Marcus Daniell	Jordan Thompson; Philip Bester	Marcus Daniell; Mitchell Krueger; Dimitar Kutrovsky; Dennis Novikov
August 18	Chinese Taipei F1 Futures; Kaohsiung, Chinese Taipei; Hard $15,000	Huang Liang-chi; 6–3, 6–4	Andrew Whittington	Kento Takeuchi; Chen Ti	Wang Chieh-fu; Arata Onozawa; Yu Cheng-yu; Takuto Niki
August 18	Chinese Taipei F1 Futures; Kaohsiung, Chinese Taipei; Hard $15,000	Arata Onozawa; Takao Suzuki; 7–6^{(7–3)}, 6–3	Chen Ti; Huang Liang-chi	Kento Takeuchi; Chen Ti	Wang Chieh-fu; Arata Onozawa; Yu Cheng-yu; Takuto Niki
August 18	Colombia F3 Futures; Medellín, Colombia; Clay $15,000	Marcelo Arévalo; 7–6^{(7–2)}, 6–4	Juan Carlos Spir	Facundo Mena; Carlos Salamanca	Juan Manuel Benítez Chavarriaga; Fabiano de Paula; Alex Llompart; Gianni Mina
August 18	Colombia F3 Futures; Medellín, Colombia; Clay $15,000	Marcelo Arévalo; César Ramírez; 6–4, 6–4	Cătălin-Ionuț Gârd; Facundo Mena	Facundo Mena; Carlos Salamanca	Juan Manuel Benítez Chavarriaga; Fabiano de Paula; Alex Llompart; Gianni Mina
August 18	Gabon F1 Futures; Libreville, Gabon; Hard $15,000	Arthur Surreaux; 5–7, 7–6^{(7–3)}, 6–1	Sam Barry	Jeevan Nedunchezhiyan; Ruan Roelofse	Kryce-Didier Momo-Kassa; Denis Indondo Ilogende; Sagar Ahuja; Sander Gillé
August 18	Gabon F1 Futures; Libreville, Gabon; Hard $15,000	Sam Barry; Jeevan Nedunchezhiyan; 6–2, 6–2	Mark Fynn; Ruan Roelofse	Jeevan Nedunchezhiyan; Ruan Roelofse	Kryce-Didier Momo-Kassa; Denis Indondo Ilogende; Sagar Ahuja; Sander Gillé
August 18	Italy F28 Futures; Este, Italy; Clay $15,000+H	Tomislav Brkić; 6–2, 7–6^{(8–6)}	Francesco Picco	Walter Trusendi; Tristan Lamasine	Daniel Muñoz de la Nava; Pedro Cachin; Mirza Bašić; Yannik Reuter
August 18	Italy F28 Futures; Este, Italy; Clay $15,000+H	Francesco Picco; Walter Trusendi; 6–4, 7–6^{(10–8)}	Frederico Gil; Lorenzo Giustino	Walter Trusendi; Tristan Lamasine	Daniel Muñoz de la Nava; Pedro Cachin; Mirza Bašić; Yannik Reuter
August 18	Netherlands F5 Futures; Oldenzaal, Netherlands; Clay $15,000	Alexandar Lazov; 5–7, 7–6^{(9–7)}, 6–4	Niels Lootsma	Arthur De Greef; Constant Lestienne	Simone Vagnozzi; Robert Constantinovici; Julien Obry; Alban Meuffels
August 18	Netherlands F5 Futures; Oldenzaal, Netherlands; Clay $15,000	Sander Groen; Alexandre Sidorenko; 6–3, 6–2	Romano Frantzen; Darren Walsh	Arthur De Greef; Constant Lestienne	Simone Vagnozzi; Robert Constantinovici; Julien Obry; Alban Meuffels
August 18	Poland F5 Futures; Poznań, Poland; Clay $15,000	Michal Schmid; 6–1, 3–6, 6–2	Grzegorz Panfil	Błażej Koniusz; Piotr Łomacki	Hubert Hurkacz; Viktor Kostin; Piotr Gadomski; Adrian Sikora
August 18	Poland F5 Futures; Poznań, Poland; Clay $15,000	Roman Jebavý; Adrian Sikora; 4–6, 6–3, [10–5]	Andriej Kapaś; Błażej Koniusz	Błażej Koniusz; Piotr Łomacki	Hubert Hurkacz; Viktor Kostin; Piotr Gadomski; Adrian Sikora
August 18	Russia F8 Futures; Moscow, Russia; Clay $15,000	Victor Baluda; 6–3, 6–4	Philipp Davydenko	Vladimir Ivanov; Evgeny Karlovskiy	Anton Zaitcev; Andrei Levine; Daniil Medvedev; Gleb Alekseenko
August 18	Russia F8 Futures; Moscow, Russia; Clay $15,000	Vladimir Ivanov; Yan Sabanin; 7–6^{(7–1)}, 6–0	Evgeny Elistratov; Franko Miočić	Vladimir Ivanov; Evgeny Karlovskiy	Anton Zaitcev; Andrei Levine; Daniil Medvedev; Gleb Alekseenko
August 18	Argentina F14 Futures; San Juan, Argentina; Clay $10,000	Ryūsei Makiguchi; 7–5, 2–6, 6–4	Juan Pablo Ficovich	Tomás Lipovšek Puches; Juan Pablo Paz	Herman Casanova; Juan Ignacio Amael; Gaston Arturo Grimolizzi; Nicolás Kicker
August 18	Argentina F14 Futures; San Juan, Argentina; Clay $10,000	Herman Casanova; Nicolás Kicker; 7–6^{(7–3)}, 6–4	Franco Capalbo; Juan Pablo Ficovich	Tomás Lipovšek Puches; Juan Pablo Paz	Herman Casanova; Juan Ignacio Amael; Gaston Arturo Grimolizzi; Nicolás Kicker
August 18	Austria F8 Futures; Vogau, Austria; Clay $10,000	Mario Haider-Maurer; 4–6, 7–5, 7–5	Riccardo Bellotti	Dennis Novak; Filip Brtnický	Christian Trubrig; Kim Young-seok; Patrick Ofner; Michal Konečný
August 18	Austria F8 Futures; Vogau, Austria; Clay $10,000	Pascal Brunner; Thomas Statzberger; 2–6, 6–1, [12–10]	Dmitry Popko; Tristan-Samuel Weissborn	Dennis Novak; Filip Brtnický	Christian Trubrig; Kim Young-seok; Patrick Ofner; Michal Konečný
August 18	Belgium F12 Futures; Huy, Belgium; Clay $10,000	Jan Choinski; 3–6, 6–4, 7–6^{(7–3)}	Julien Cagnina	Germain Gigounon; Omar Salman	Dimitar Grabul; Mick Lescure; Juan Matías González Carrasco; Andrei Plotniy
August 18	Belgium F12 Futures; Huy, Belgium; Clay $10,000	Maxime Forcin; Mick Lescure; Walkover	Julien Cagnina; Omar Salman	Germain Gigounon; Omar Salman	Dimitar Grabul; Mick Lescure; Juan Matías González Carrasco; Andrei Plotniy
August 18	Croatia F14 Futures; Čakovec, Croatia; Clay $10,000	Enzo Couacaud; 6–2, 6–4	Peter Heller	Franjo Raspudić; Mike Urbanija	Nicolas Reissig; Adrian Partl; Duje Kekez; Lukas Jastraunig
August 18	Croatia F14 Futures; Čakovec, Croatia; Clay $10,000	Jan Kunčík; Dominik Süč; 3–6, 6–3, [10–8]	Tomislav Draganja; Antonio Šančić	Franjo Raspudić; Mike Urbanija	Nicolas Reissig; Adrian Partl; Duje Kekez; Lukas Jastraunig
August 18	Ecuador F3 Futures; Quito, Ecuador; Clay $10,000	Gonzalo Escobar; 4–6, 7–6^{(7–5)}, 6–3	Jean-Yves Aubone	Federico Zeballos; Rodrigo Banzer	Manuel Sánchez; Julian Busch; Connor Smith; Mauricio Echazú
August 18	Ecuador F3 Futures; Quito, Ecuador; Clay $10,000	Gonzalo Escobar; Rodrigo Sánchez; 6–1, 6–0	Caio Silva; Thales Turini	Federico Zeballos; Rodrigo Banzer	Manuel Sánchez; Julian Busch; Connor Smith; Mauricio Echazú
August 18	Finland F3 Futures; Helsinki, Finland; Clay $10,000	Aleksandr Vasilenko; 6–3, 6–1	Micke Kontinen	Juho Paukku; Peter Goldsteiner	Jeremy Jahn; Maxime Tabatruong; Ouyang Bowen; Romain Arneodo
August 18	Finland F3 Futures; Helsinki, Finland; Clay $10,000	Jacob Adaktusson; Jesper Brunström; 7–6^{(9–7)}, 6–2	Giorgio Portaluri; Lucas Renard	Juho Paukku; Peter Goldsteiner	Jeremy Jahn; Maxime Tabatruong; Ouyang Bowen; Romain Arneodo
August 18	Germany F13 Futures; Überlingen, Germany; Clay $10,000	Nils Langer; 6–4, 3–6, 6–2	Maximilian Marterer	Evgeny Korolev; Florian Fallert	Bastian Trinker; Sandro Ehrat; Moritz Baumann; Kevin Krawietz
August 18	Germany F13 Futures; Überlingen, Germany; Clay $10,000	Florian Fallert; Nils Langer; 6–3, 7–5	Johannes Härteis; Hannes Wagner	Evgeny Korolev; Florian Fallert	Bastian Trinker; Sandro Ehrat; Moritz Baumann; Kevin Krawietz
August 18	Iran F8 Futures; Tehran, Iran; Clay $10,000	Jules Marie; 5–7, 6–2, 6–4	Alexis Musialek	Shotaro Goto; Matteo Marfia	Luca Margaroli; Vinayk Sharma Kaza; Jordi Muñoz Abreu; Gilles de Sousa
August 18	Iran F8 Futures; Tehran, Iran; Clay $10,000	Jules Marie; Alexis Musialek; 7–5, 7–6^{(7–5)}	Matteo Marfia; Luca Margaroli	Shotaro Goto; Matteo Marfia	Luca Margaroli; Vinayk Sharma Kaza; Jordi Muñoz Abreu; Gilles de Sousa
August 18	Korea F11 Futures; Anseong, South Korea; Clay (indoor) $10,000	John Millman; 6–1, 7–5	Jose Rubin Statham	Seol Jae-min; Hung Jui-chen	Kaichi Uchida; Katsuki Nagao; Lee Seung-jae; Kim Cheong-eui
August 18	Korea F11 Futures; Anseong, South Korea; Clay (indoor) $10,000	Kim Hyun-joon; Seol Jae-min; 7–6^{(8–6)}, 5–7, [10–1]	Choi Dong-whee; Choi Jae-won	Seol Jae-min; Hung Jui-chen	Kaichi Uchida; Katsuki Nagao; Lee Seung-jae; Kim Cheong-eui
August 18	Mexico F9 Futures; Rosarito Beach, Mexico; Hard $10,000	Daniel Garza; 6–3, 6–4	Miguel Gallardo Valles	Tigre Hank; Christopher Díaz Figueroa	Ben McLachlan; Evan Song; Mico Santiago; Luis Patiño
August 18	Mexico F9 Futures; Rosarito Beach, Mexico; Hard $10,000	Daniel Garza; Antonio Ruiz-Rosales; 0–6, ret.	Jarryd Chaplin; Ben McLachlan	Tigre Hank; Christopher Díaz Figueroa	Ben McLachlan; Evan Song; Mico Santiago; Luis Patiño
August 18	Romania F12 Futures; Mediaș, Romania; Clay $10,000	Filip Horanský; 4–6, 7–6 ^{(7–4)}, 6–2	Stefano Napolitano	Dragoș Dima; Jan Šátral	Frederico Ferreira Silva; Pietro Rondoni; Andrei Ciumac; Teodor-Dacian Crăciun
August 18	Romania F12 Futures; Mediaș, Romania; Clay $10,000	Libor Salaba; Jan Šátral; 6–3, 6–4	Lucian Gheorghe; Mohd Assri Merzuki	Dragoș Dima; Jan Šátral	Frederico Ferreira Silva; Pietro Rondoni; Andrei Ciumac; Teodor-Dacian Crăciun
August 18	Serbia F10 Futures; Novi Sad, Serbia; Clay $10,000	Ivan Bjelica; 6–2, 6–1	Gleb Sakharov	Tim Nekic; Marko Tepavac	Antun Pehar; Danilo Petrović; Miljan Zekić; Marko Djokovic
August 18	Serbia F10 Futures; Novi Sad, Serbia; Clay $10,000	Ivan Sabanov; Matej Sabanov; 6–3, 3–6, [10–6]	Danilo Petrović; Ilija Vučić	Tim Nekic; Marko Tepavac	Antun Pehar; Danilo Petrović; Miljan Zekić; Marko Djokovic
August 18	Spain F23 Futures; Vigo, Spain; Clay $10,000	Mateo Nicolás Martínez; 6–3, 6–0	Juan Samuel Arauzo Martínez	Eduard Esteve Lobato; Oriol Roca Batalla	Sergio Martos Gornés; João Domingues; David Vega Hernández; Pol Toledo Bagué
August 18	Spain F23 Futures; Vigo, Spain; Clay $10,000	Juan Samuel Arauzo Martínez; Oriol Roca Batalla; 6–1, 5–7, [10–5]	Sergio Martos Gornés; Pol Toledo Bagué	Eduard Esteve Lobato; Oriol Roca Batalla	Sergio Martos Gornés; João Domingues; David Vega Hernández; Pol Toledo Bagué
August 18	Switzerland F4 Futures; Sion, Switzerland; Clay $10,000	Andrea Basso; 6–4, 6–2	Élie Rousset	Johan Nikles; Adrien Bossel	Loïc Perret; Antoine Hoang; Rudolf Siwy; Siméon Rossier
August 18	Switzerland F4 Futures; Sion, Switzerland; Clay $10,000	Adrien Bossel; Michael Lammer; 6–3, 6–7^{(8–6)} [10–7]	Erik Crepaldi; Pirmin Hänle	Johan Nikles; Adrien Bossel	Loïc Perret; Antoine Hoang; Rudolf Siwy; Siméon Rossier
August 18	Turkey F28 Futures; Antalya, Turkey; Hard $10,000	Dimitar Kuzmanov; 6–1, 6–1	Yannick Jankovits	Cem İlkel; Marat Deviatiarov	Fedor Chervyakov; Alexios Halebian; Barış Ergüden; Matija Pecotić
August 18	Turkey F28 Futures; Antalya, Turkey; Hard $10,000	Marat Deviatiarov; Alexios Halebian; 6–4, 6–7^{(2–7)}, [10–2]	Juan Sebastián Gómez; Gabriel Trujillo Soler	Cem İlkel; Marat Deviatiarov	Fedor Chervyakov; Alexios Halebian; Barış Ergüden; Matija Pecotić
August 25	Chinese Taipei F2 Futures; Kaohsiung, Chinese Taipei; Hard $15,000	Karen Khachanov; 6–7^{4–6}, 6–4, 6–3	Sriram Balaji	Yang Tsung-hua; Takuto Niki	Takashi Saito; Andrew Whittington; Kento Takeuchi; He Yecong
August 25	Chinese Taipei F2 Futures; Kaohsiung, Chinese Taipei; Hard $15,000	Wang Chieh-fu; Yi Chu-huan; 6–3, 6–2	Arata Onozawa; Yang Tsung-hua	Yang Tsung-hua; Takuto Niki	Takashi Saito; Andrew Whittington; Kento Takeuchi; He Yecong
August 25	Colombia F4 Futures; Medellín, Colombia; Clay $15,000	José Hernández; 7–5, 6–2	Marcelo Arévalo	Marco Trungelliti; Giovanni Lapentti	Fabiano de Paula; Gianni Mina; Fernando Romboli; Nicolás Jarry
August 25	Colombia F4 Futures; Medellín, Colombia; Clay $15,000	Fabiano de Paula; Nicolás Jarry; 2–6, 6–2, [11–9]	Dean O'Brien; Juan Carlos Spir	Marco Trungelliti; Giovanni Lapentti	Fabiano de Paula; Gianni Mina; Fernando Romboli; Nicolás Jarry
August 25	Ecuador F4 Futures; Quito, Ecuador; Clay $15,000	Connor Smith; 6–4, 6–4	Guillermo Rivera Aránguiz	Thales Turini; André Miele	Manuel Sánchez; Gonzalo Escobar; Rodrigo Banzer; Hugo Dellien
August 25	Ecuador F4 Futures; Quito, Ecuador; Clay $15,000	Mauricio Echazú; Guillermo Rivera Aránguiz; 6–3, 6–4	Hugo Dellien; Federico Zeballos	Thales Turini; André Miele	Manuel Sánchez; Gonzalo Escobar; Rodrigo Banzer; Hugo Dellien
August 25	Gabon F2 Futures; Libreville, Gabon; Clay $15,000	Sam Barry; 6–3, 7–5	Ruan Roelofse	Jeevan Nedunchezhiyan; Arthur Surreaux	Sander Gillé; Hassan Ndayishimiye; Mark Fynn; Matias Castro
August 25	Gabon F2 Futures; Libreville, Gabon; Clay $15,000	Sam Barry; Jeevan Nedunchezhiyan; 7–6^{(7–5)}, 6–3	Mark Fynn; Ruan Roelofse	Jeevan Nedunchezhiyan; Arthur Surreaux	Sander Gillé; Hassan Ndayishimiye; Mark Fynn; Matias Castro
August 25	Italy F29 Futures; Piombino, Italy; Clay $15,000	Yannick Mertens; 6–4, 7–6^{(7–3)}	Martin Vaïsse	David Guez; Michal Schmid	Alessandro Bega; Daniele Capecchi; Robin Kern; Claudio Grassi
August 25	Italy F29 Futures; Piombino, Italy; Clay $15,000	Francesco Borgo; Claudio Grassi; 3–6, 6–3, [10–6]	Alessandro Bega; Davide Della Tommasina	David Guez; Michal Schmid	Alessandro Bega; Daniele Capecchi; Robin Kern; Claudio Grassi
August 25	Netherlands F6 Futures; Rotterdam, Netherlands; Clay $15,000	Darian King; 2–6, 6–3, 6–2	Julien Obry	Arthur De Greef; Mats Moraing	Alexandre Sidorenko; Evgeny Korolev; Elmar Ejupovic; Matthias Wunner
August 25	Netherlands F6 Futures; Rotterdam, Netherlands; Clay $15,000	Stephan Fransen; Matwé Middelkoop; 6–1, 6–2	Marc Rath; Nicolas Reissig	Arthur De Greef; Mats Moraing	Alexandre Sidorenko; Evgeny Korolev; Elmar Ejupovic; Matthias Wunner
August 25	Poland F6 Futures; Bytom, Poland; Clay $15,000	Marek Michalička; 6–1, 6–1	Dušan Lojda	Andriej Kapaś; Grzegorz Panfil	Marko Mokrzycki; Adrian Sikora; Wilson Leite; Ivo Klec
August 25	Poland F6 Futures; Bytom, Poland; Clay $15,000	Piotr Gadomski; Mateusz Kowalczyk; 4–6, 6–3, [10–4]	Andriej Kapaś; Błażej Koniusz	Andriej Kapaś; Grzegorz Panfil	Marko Mokrzycki; Adrian Sikora; Wilson Leite; Ivo Klec
August 25	Romania F13 Futures; Brașov, Romania; Clay $15,000	Nikola Ćaćić; 6–4, 4–6, 7–5	Frederico Ferreira Silva	Roman Jebavý; Filippo Leonardi	Stefano Napolitano; Claudio Fortuna; Petru-Alexandru Luncanu; Vadim Alekseenko
August 25	Romania F13 Futures; Brașov, Romania; Clay $15,000	Bogdan Ionuț Apostol; Lukas Mugevičius; 2–6, 6–3, [10–8]	Alexandru-Daniel Carpen; Claudio Fortuna	Roman Jebavý; Filippo Leonardi	Stefano Napolitano; Claudio Fortuna; Petru-Alexandru Luncanu; Vadim Alekseenko
August 25	Spain F24 Futures; Pozoblanco, Spain; Hard $15,000+H	Edward Corrie; 6–4, 7–6^{(7–4)}	Brydan Klein	Cristian Garín; Wang Chuhan	Adrián Menéndez Maceiras; Íñigo Cervantes Huegun; Pol Toledo Bagué; Oriol Roca Batalla
August 25	Spain F24 Futures; Pozoblanco, Spain; Hard $15,000+H	Edward Corrie; David Rice; 6–4, 7–5	Lewis Burton; Marcus Willis	Cristian Garín; Wang Chuhan	Adrián Menéndez Maceiras; Íñigo Cervantes Huegun; Pol Toledo Bagué; Oriol Roca Batalla
August 25	Argentina F15 Futures; La Rioja, Argentina; Clay $10,000	Nicolás Kicker; 7–6^{(7–4)}, 7–5	Juan Pablo Paz	Hernán Casanova; Joaquin Jesús Monteferrario	Juan Ignacio Ameal; Gaston Arturo Grimolizzi; Sebastián Exequiel Pini; Oscar José Gutierrez
August 25	Argentina F15 Futures; La Rioja, Argentina; Clay $10,000	Juan Ignacio Galarza; Joaquin Jesús Monteferrario; 6–3, 7–6^{(7–5)}	Dante Gennaro; Juan Pablo Paz	Hernán Casanova; Joaquin Jesús Monteferrario	Juan Ignacio Ameal; Gaston Arturo Grimolizzi; Sebastián Exequiel Pini; Oscar José Gutierrez
August 25	Austria F9 Futures; Pörtschach am Wörthersee, Austria; Clay $10,000	Janez Semrajc; 6–2, 6–2	Adrian Partl	Mario Haider-Maurer; Christian Trubrig	Dennis Novak; Lukas Jastraunig; Pascal Brunner; Tristan-Samuel Weissborn
August 25	Austria F9 Futures; Pörtschach am Wörthersee, Austria; Clay $10,000	Sebastian Bader; Tristan-Samuel Weissborn; 6–4, 7–6^{(7–3)}	Gonçalo Oliveira; Daniel Uhlig	Mario Haider-Maurer; Christian Trubrig	Dennis Novak; Lukas Jastraunig; Pascal Brunner; Tristan-Samuel Weissborn
August 25	Belgium F13 Futures; De Panne, Belgium; Clay $10,000	Johan-Sébastien Tatlot; 7–5, 6–3	Julien Dubail	Antoine Hoang; Alexandre Folie	Thomas Grinberg; Jack Carpenter; Dimitar Grabul; Omar Salman
August 25	Belgium F13 Futures; De Panne, Belgium; Clay $10,000	Scott Griekspoor; Tallon Griekspoor; 6–1, 6–2	Michael Geerts; James Junior Storme	Antoine Hoang; Alexandre Folie	Thomas Grinberg; Jack Carpenter; Dimitar Grabul; Omar Salman
August 25	Croatia F15 Futures; Osijek, Croatia; Clay $10,000	Javier Martí; 6–0, 6–4	Dominik Süč	Jan Šátral; Marek Semjan	Kristijan Mesaroš; Antonio Šančić; Ivan Bjelica; Tomislav Ternar
August 25	Croatia F15 Futures; Osijek, Croatia; Clay $10,000	Libor Salaba; Jan Šátral; 7–6^{(7–4)}, 6–4	Tomislav Draganja; Antonio Šančić	Jan Šátral; Marek Semjan	Kristijan Mesaroš; Antonio Šančić; Ivan Bjelica; Tomislav Ternar
August 25	Iran F9 Futures; Tehran, Iran; Clay $10,000	Alexis Musialek; 7–5, 6–0	Jules Marie	Shotaro Goto; Matteo Marfia	Arkadiusz Kocyla; Jordi Muñoz Abreu; Luca Pancaldi; Vijay Sundar Prashanth
August 25	Iran F9 Futures; Tehran, Iran; Clay $10,000	Vinayak Sharma Kaza; Vijay Sundar Prashanth; 6–3, 6–4	Markos Kalovelonis; Amirvala Mandachi	Shotaro Goto; Matteo Marfia	Arkadiusz Kocyla; Jordi Muñoz Abreu; Luca Pancaldi; Vijay Sundar Prashanth
August 25	Korea F12 Futures; Anseong, South Korea; Clay (indoor) $10,000	Kaichi Uchida; 6–4, 7–5	Chung Hong	Song Min-kyu; Seol Jae-min	Yuuya Kibi; Son Ji-hoon; Kang Ku-keon; Noh Sang-woo
August 25	Korea F12 Futures; Anseong, South Korea; Clay (indoor) $10,000	Kim Yu-seob; Lim Hyung-chan; 4–6, 7–6^{(7–2)}, [10–6]	Choi Dong-whee; Choi Jae-won	Song Min-kyu; Seol Jae-min	Yuuya Kibi; Son Ji-hoon; Kang Ku-keon; Noh Sang-woo
August 25	Mexico F10 Futures; Puebla, Mexico; Clay $10,000	Christopher Díaz Figueroa; 6–0, 6–4	Luis Patiño	Adam El Mihdawy; Alberto Rojas Maldonado	Carlos Ramírez Utermann; Farris Fathi Gosea; Rogelio Siller; Collin Johns
August 25	Mexico F10 Futures; Puebla, Mexico; Clay $10,000	Hans Hach; Chris Letcher; 6–3, 6–4	Adrián Fernández; Lázaro Navarro-Batles	Adam El Mihdawy; Alberto Rojas Maldonado	Carlos Ramírez Utermann; Farris Fathi Gosea; Rogelio Siller; Collin Johns
August 25	Peru F4 Futures; Arequipa, Peru; Clay $10,000	Filipe Brandão; 6–4, 4–6, 6–4	Juan Pablo Varillas	Jorge Cavero; Alejandro Mendoza	Tiago Lopes; Franco Moral; Ryūsei Makiguchi; Justiniano Richard
August 25	Peru F4 Futures; Arequipa, Peru; Clay $10,000	Jorge Brian Panta; Juan Pablo Varillas; 6–3, 3–6, [10–6]	Ryūsei Makiguchi; Devin McCarthy	Jorge Cavero; Alejandro Mendoza	Tiago Lopes; Franco Moral; Ryūsei Makiguchi; Justiniano Richard
August 25	Serbia F11 Futures; Zlatibor, Serbia; Clay $10,000	Miljan Zekić; 6–4, 6–2	Danilo Petrović	Plamen Milushev; Tomislav Jotovski	Dejan Katić; Ilija Vučić; Arsenije Zlatanović; Denis Bejtulahi
August 25	Serbia F11 Futures; Zlatibor, Serbia; Clay $10,000	Danilo Petrović; Ilija Vučić; 2–6, 6–3, [10–7]	Dinko Halachev; Plamen Milushev	Plamen Milushev; Tomislav Jotovski	Dejan Katić; Ilija Vučić; Arsenije Zlatanović; Denis Bejtulahi
August 25	Switzerland F5 Futures; Lausanne, Switzerland; Clay $10,000	Cristian Villagrán; 6–4, 0–6, 6–2	Maximiliano Estévez	Pascal Meis; Adrien Bossel	Gao Xin; Maxime Hamou; Tobias Simon; Théo Fournerie
August 25	Switzerland F5 Futures; Lausanne, Switzerland; Clay $10,000	Mathieu Guenat; Siméon Rossier; 7–6^{(7–5)}, 6–2	Joss Espasandin; Jorge Montero	Pascal Meis; Adrien Bossel	Gao Xin; Maxime Hamou; Tobias Simon; Théo Fournerie
August 25	Turkey F29 Futures; Antalya, Turkey; Clay $10,000	Dimitar Kuzmanov; 6–1, 6–3	Cem İlkel	Patrik Fabian; Yannick Jankovits	Ugo Nastasi; Tucker Vorster; Alexios Halebian; Dane Propoggia
August 25	Turkey F29 Futures; Antalya, Turkey; Clay $10,000	Nikala Scholtz; Tucker Vorster; 6–4, 6–4	Tuna Altuna; Efe Yurtacan	Patrik Fabian; Yannick Jankovits	Ugo Nastasi; Tucker Vorster; Alexios Halebian; Dane Propoggia

=== September ===
Week of	Tournament	Winner	Runners-up	Semifinalists	Quarterfinalists
September 1	Canada F9 Futures; Toronto, Canada; Clay $15,000	Bjorn Fratangelo; 6–2, 6–3	Mitchell Krueger	Sekou Bangoura; Daniel Nguyen	Michael Bois; Laurent Recouderc; Justin Shane; Philip Bester
September 1	Canada F9 Futures; Toronto, Canada; Clay $15,000	Sekou Bangoura; Evan King; 6–4, 4–6, [11–9]	Bjorn Fratangelo; Mitchell Krueger	Sekou Bangoura; Daniel Nguyen	Michael Bois; Laurent Recouderc; Justin Shane; Philip Bester
September 1	Ecuador F5 Futures; Quito, Ecuador; Clay $15,000	Gonzalo Escobar; 6–2, 6–1	Mauricio Echazú	Iván Endara; Connor Smith	Henrique Cunha; Federico Zeballos; Ryūsei Makiguchi; Guillermo Rivera Aránguiz
September 1	Ecuador F5 Futures; Quito, Ecuador; Clay $15,000	Mauricio Echazú; Guillermo Rivera Aránguiz; 5–7, 7–6^{(7–1)}, [13–11]	Ryūsei Makiguchi; Federico Zeballos	Iván Endara; Connor Smith	Henrique Cunha; Federico Zeballos; Ryūsei Makiguchi; Guillermo Rivera Aránguiz
September 1	France F17 Futures; Bagnères-de-Bigorre, France; Hard $15,000+H	Enzo Couacaud; 6–2, 6–3	Laurent Lokoli	Grégoire Barrère; Johan-Sébastien Tatlot	Tim Pütz; David Rice; Julien Dubail; Paul Cayré
September 1	France F17 Futures; Bagnères-de-Bigorre, France; Hard $15,000+H	Edward Corrie; David Rice; 6–4, 2–6, [10–5]	Enzo Couacaud; Laurent Lokoli	Grégoire Barrère; Johan-Sébastien Tatlot	Tim Pütz; David Rice; Julien Dubail; Paul Cayré
September 1	Great Britain F15 Futures; London, Great Britain; Hard $15,000	Frederik Nielsen; 2–6, 6–4, 6–4	Marcus Willis	Joshua Ward-Hibbert; Joshua Milton	Lucas Renard; Brydan Klein; George Coupland; Luke Bambridge
September 1	Great Britain F15 Futures; London, Great Britain; Hard $15,000	Frederik Nielsen; Joshua Ward-Hibbert; 6–7^{(5–7)}, 6–4, [10–8]	David O'Hare; Joe Salisbury	Joshua Ward-Hibbert; Joshua Milton	Lucas Renard; Brydan Klein; George Coupland; Luke Bambridge
September 1	Russia F9 Futures; Vsevolozhsk, Russia; Clay $15,000	Marc Giner; 7–6^{(7–5)}, 6–1	Anton Zaitcev	Ilya Lebedev; Alexander Zhurbin	Andrei Vasilevski; Aleksandr Vasilenko; Vadim Alekseenko; Bogdan Bobrov
September 1	Russia F9 Futures; Vsevolozhsk, Russia; Clay $15,000	Marc Giner; Alexander Zhurbin; 7–5, 6–4	Evgeny Elistratov; Vladimir Polyakov	Ilya Lebedev; Alexander Zhurbin	Andrei Vasilevski; Aleksandr Vasilenko; Vadim Alekseenko; Bogdan Bobrov
September 1	Spain F25 Futures; Oviedo, Spain; Clay $15,000	Jordi Samper Montaña; 6–2, 6–4	Oriol Roca Batalla	Jaume Munar; Cristian Garín	Ricardo Ojeda Lara; Ferran Calvo Eman; David Vega Hernández; Mateo Nicolás Martínez
September 1	Spain F25 Futures; Oviedo, Spain; Clay $15,000	Juan Samuel Arauzo Martínez; Iván Arenas Gualda; 7–6^{(7–3)}, 7–6^{(12–10)}	Ivan Gakhov; Mateo Nicolás Martínez	Jaume Munar; Cristian Garín	Ricardo Ojeda Lara; Ferran Calvo Eman; David Vega Hernández; Mateo Nicolás Martínez
September 1	Tunisia F4 Futures; Carthage, Tunisia; Clay $15,000	Maxime Hamou; 3–6, 7–5, 6–2	Théo Fournerie	Christian Plattes; Jonathan Kanar	Jordan Ubiergo; Claudio Grassi; Alexandros Jakupovic; Nikola Milojević
September 1	Tunisia F4 Futures; Carthage, Tunisia; Clay $15,000	Claudio Grassi; Stefano Travaglia; 6–2, 6–3	Sander Gillé; Alexandros Jakupovic	Christian Plattes; Jonathan Kanar	Jordan Ubiergo; Claudio Grassi; Alexandros Jakupovic; Nikola Milojević
September 1	Argentina F16 Futures; Santiago del Estero, Argentina; Clay $10,000	Nicolás Kicker; 6–3, 6–0	Federico Coria	Juan Pablo Ficovich; Guillermo Durán	Juan Ignacio Ameal; Mauricio Pérez Mota; Mariano Kestelboim; Nicolás Alejandro de Gregorio
September 1	Argentina F16 Futures; Santiago del Estero, Argentina; Clay $10,000	Matías Franco Descotte; Gonzalo Villanueva; 4–6, 6–4, [10–1]	Juan Manuel Matute; Mauricio Pérez Mota	Juan Pablo Ficovich; Guillermo Durán	Juan Ignacio Ameal; Mauricio Pérez Mota; Mariano Kestelboim; Nicolás Alejandro de Gregorio
September 1	Austria F10 Futures; Sankt Pölten, Austria; Clay $10,000	Nils Langer; 0–6, 6–3, 6–2	Kirill Dmitriev	Pascal Brunner; Kevin Krawietz	Michal Pažický; Romain Barbosa; Marek Semjan; Adrian Partl
September 1	Austria F10 Futures; Sankt Pölten, Austria; Clay $10,000	Filip Doležel; Petr Michnev; 6–7^{(4–7)}, 6–4, [10–5]	Sebastian Bader; Tristan-Samuel Weissborn	Pascal Brunner; Kevin Krawietz	Michal Pažický; Romain Barbosa; Marek Semjan; Adrian Partl
September 1	Belgium F14 Futures; Arlon, Belgium; Clay $10,000	Steve Darcis; 6–2, 6–2	Scott Griekspoor	Alexandre Folie; François-Arthur Vibert	Michael Geerts; Marvin Netuschil; Juan Matías González Carrasco; Antoine Hoang
September 1	Belgium F14 Futures; Arlon, Belgium; Clay $10,000	Pascal Meis; François-Arthur Vibert; 6–2, 6–2	(Australia) Adam Taylor (Australia) Jason Taylor	Alexandre Folie; François-Arthur Vibert	Michael Geerts; Marvin Netuschil; Juan Matías González Carrasco; Antoine Hoang
September 1	Croatia F16 Futures; Bol, Croatia; Clay $10,000	Tomislav Brkić; 7–5, 6–2	Riccardo Sinicropi	Yanais Laurent; Evgeny Korolev	Franjo Raspudić; Blaž Bizjak; Ljubomir Čelebić; Riccardo Bonadio
September 1	Croatia F16 Futures; Bol, Croatia; Clay $10,000	Gábor Borsos; Antonio Mastrelia; 7–5, 3–6, [10–6]	Sander Groen; Evgeny Korolev	Yanais Laurent; Evgeny Korolev	Franjo Raspudić; Blaž Bizjak; Ljubomir Čelebić; Riccardo Bonadio
September 1	Iran F10 Futures; Tehran, Iran; Clay $10,000	Alexis Musialek; 6–1, 6–2	Jordi Muñoz Abreu	Fabio Mercuri; Luca Pancaldi	Jules Marie; Shotaro Goto; Matteo Marfia; Vijay Sundar Prashanth
September 1	Iran F10 Futures; Tehran, Iran; Clay $10,000	Matteo Marfia; Luca Margaroli; 6–4, 7–6^{(7–4)}	Jordi Muñoz Abreu; Mark Vervoort	Fabio Mercuri; Luca Pancaldi	Jules Marie; Shotaro Goto; Matteo Marfia; Vijay Sundar Prashanth
September 1	Italy F30 Futures; Trieste, Italy; Clay $10,000	Nicolas Reissig; 6–4, 6–2	Tomislav Ternar	Lorenzo Sonego; Tom Kočevar-Dešman	Jeremy Jahn; Francesco Borgo; Davide Della Tommasina; Mike Urbanija
September 1	Italy F30 Futures; Trieste, Italy; Clay $10,000	Matjaž Jurman; Tom Kočevar-Dešman; 6–2, 6–4	Marco Bortolotti; Pietro Rondoni	Lorenzo Sonego; Tom Kočevar-Dešman	Jeremy Jahn; Francesco Borgo; Davide Della Tommasina; Mike Urbanija
September 1	Mexico F11 Futures; Tehuacán, Mexico; Hard $10,000	Adam El Mihdawy; 6–2, 6–2	Evan Song	Dekel Bar; Christopher Díaz Figueroa	Luis Patiño; Hans Hach; Mauricio Astorga; Miguel Gallardo Valles
September 1	Mexico F11 Futures; Tehuacán, Mexico; Hard $10,000	Mauricio Astorga; Alberto Rojas Maldonado; 3–6, 6–4, [10–8]	Miguel Gallardo Valles; Antonio Ruiz-Rosales	Dekel Bar; Christopher Díaz Figueroa	Luis Patiño; Hans Hach; Mauricio Astorga; Miguel Gallardo Valles
September 1	Peru F5 Futures; Lima, Peru; Clay $10,000	Juan Carlos Sáez; 6–4, 7–5	Cristóbal Saavedra Corvalán	Jorge Aguilar; Duilio Beretta	Tiago Lopes; Jorge Brian Panta; Fabrício Neis; Devin McCarthy
September 1	Peru F5 Futures; Lima, Peru; Clay $10,000	Fabrício Neis; Alexandre Tsuchiya; 1–6, 6–3, [10–5]	Augusto Laranja; Nicolas Santos	Jorge Aguilar; Duilio Beretta	Tiago Lopes; Jorge Brian Panta; Fabrício Neis; Devin McCarthy
September 1	Poland F7 Futures; Piekary Śląskie, Poland; Clay $10,000	Dušan Lojda; 4–6, 6–3, 7–6^{(7–3)}	Kamil Majchrzak	Piotr Gadomski; Andriej Kapaś	Mikołaj Jędruszczak; Błażej Koniusz; Václav Šafránek; Marcin Gawron
September 1	Poland F7 Futures; Piekary Śląskie, Poland; Clay $10,000	Marcin Gawron; Błażej Koniusz; 7–6^{(7–4)}, 4–6, [10–3]	Piotr Gadomski; Maciej Smoła	Piotr Gadomski; Andriej Kapaś	Mikołaj Jędruszczak; Błażej Koniusz; Václav Šafránek; Marcin Gawron
September 1	Turkey F30 Futures; Antalya, Turkey; Hard $10,000	Tucker Vorster; 6–3, 3–6, 7–6^{(10–8)}	Nikala Scholtz	Hugo Nys; Rémi Boutillier	Antoine Escoffier; Tom Jomby; Patrik Fabian; Ruan Roelofse
September 1	Turkey F30 Futures; Antalya, Turkey; Hard $10,000	Alexios Halebian; Tom Jomby; 6–4, 6–2	Ugo Nastasi; Christophe Nickels	Hugo Nys; Rémi Boutillier	Antoine Escoffier; Tom Jomby; Patrik Fabian; Ruan Roelofse
September 8	Belgium F15 Futures; Westende, Belgium; Clay $15,000+H	Germain Gigounon; 6–4, 7–6^{(7–3)}	Julien Cagnina	Michael Linzer; Joris De Loore	Niels Desein; Marvin Netuschil; Alban Meuffels; Clément Geens
September 8	Belgium F15 Futures; Westende, Belgium; Clay $15,000+H	Tom Schönenberg; Matthias Wunner; 7–6^{(7–5)}, 7–6^{(7–3)}	Louis Cant; James Junior Storme	Michael Linzer; Joris De Loore	Niels Desein; Marvin Netuschil; Alban Meuffels; Clément Geens
September 8	Canada F10 Futures; Toronto, Canada; Hard $15,000	Bjorn Fratangelo; 6–4, 6–2	Eric Quigley	Philip Bester; Fritz Wolmarans	Sekou Bangoura; Harry Bourchier; Mitchell Krueger; Dimitar Kutrovsky
September 8	Canada F10 Futures; Toronto, Canada; Hard $15,000	Michael Bois; Isade Juneau; 6–4, 4–6, [10–5]	Sekou Bangoura; Pavel Krainik	Philip Bester; Fritz Wolmarans	Sekou Bangoura; Harry Bourchier; Mitchell Krueger; Dimitar Kutrovsky
September 8	Colombia F5 Futures; Ibagué, Colombia; Clay $15,000	Agustín Velotti; 6–3, 6–1	Fabiano de Paula	Felipe Mantilla; Nicolás Barrientos	Marcelo Demoliner; Theodoros Angelinos; Dean O'Brien; José Hernández
September 8	Colombia F5 Futures; Ibagué, Colombia; Clay $15,000	Nicolás Barrientos; Dean O'Brien; 6–3, 5–7, [10–7]	Fabiano de Paula; Marcelo Demoliner	Felipe Mantilla; Nicolás Barrientos	Marcelo Demoliner; Theodoros Angelinos; Dean O'Brien; José Hernández
September 8	Ecuador F6 Futures; Ibarra, Ecuador; Clay $15,000	Giovanni Lapentti; 6–2, 7–6^{(7–4)}	Marco Trungelliti	Andrés Molteni; Eduardo Struvay	André Miele; Gonzalo Escobar; Iván Endara; Hugo Dellien
September 8	Ecuador F6 Futures; Ibarra, Ecuador; Clay $15,000	Sergio Galdós; Marco Trungelliti; 7–6^{(7–5)}, 7–6^{(7–2)}	Kevin King; Juan Carlos Spir	Andrés Molteni; Eduardo Struvay	André Miele; Gonzalo Escobar; Iván Endara; Hugo Dellien
September 8	France F18 Futures; Mulhouse, France; Hard (indoor) $15,000+H	Karen Khachanov; 6–2, 6–0	David Guez	Calvin Hemery; Grégoire Jacq	Enzo Couacaud; Élie Rousset; Daniil Medvedev; Moritz Baumann
September 8	France F18 Futures; Mulhouse, France; Hard (indoor) $15,000+H	Karen Khachanov; Daniil Medvedev; 7–6^{(7–5)}, 4–6, [10–7]	Olivier Charroin; Élie Rousset	Calvin Hemery; Grégoire Jacq	Enzo Couacaud; Élie Rousset; Daniil Medvedev; Moritz Baumann
September 8	Great Britain F16 Futures; Wrexham, Great Britain; Hard $15,000	Liam Broady; 3–6, 7–5, 7–6^{(8–6)}	Edward Corrie	Daniel Cox; Joshua Milton	Lewis Burton; Grégoire Barrère; Brydan Klein; Oliver Hudson
September 8	Great Britain F16 Futures; Wrexham, Great Britain; Hard $15,000	Edward Corrie; David Rice; 6–7^{(3–7)}, 6–4, [10–8]	Luke Bambridge; Liam Broady	Daniel Cox; Joshua Milton	Lewis Burton; Grégoire Barrère; Brydan Klein; Oliver Hudson
September 8	Russia F10 Futures; Vsevolozhsk, Russia; Clay $15,000	Vladimir Ivanov; 6–1, 6–0	Evgenii Tiurnev	Alexander Bublik; Aleksandr Vasilenko	Marc Giner; Richard Muzaev; Dmitry Surchenko; Ilya Lebedev
September 8	Russia F10 Futures; Vsevolozhsk, Russia; Clay $15,000	Alexander Bublik; Richard Muzaev; 6–3, 3–6, [11–9]	Vladimir Ivanov; Andrei Vasilevski	Alexander Bublik; Aleksandr Vasilenko	Marc Giner; Richard Muzaev; Dmitry Surchenko; Ilya Lebedev
September 8	Tunisia F5 Futures; Carthage, Tunisia; Clay $15,000	Stefano Travaglia; 6–4, 4–6, 6–3	Maxime Hamou	Alexandros Jakupovic; Sander Gillé	Théo Fournerie; Filippo Borella; Ronald Slobodchikov; Maxime Janvier
September 8	Tunisia F5 Futures; Carthage, Tunisia; Clay $15,000	Théo Fournerie; Jonathan Kanar; 6–3, 6–7^{(1–7)}, [10–3]	Christian Plattes; Leon Schutt	Alexandros Jakupovic; Sander Gillé	Théo Fournerie; Filippo Borella; Ronald Slobodchikov; Maxime Janvier
September 8	Argentina F17 Futures; Villa del Dique, Argentina; Clay $10,000	Nicolás Kicker; 7–5, 6–1	Federico Coria	Gabriel Alejandro Hidalgo; Maximiliano Estévez	Gaston Arturo Grimolizzi; Eduardo Agustín Torre; Luciano Doria; Joaquin Jesús Monteferrario
September 8	Argentina F17 Futures; Villa del Dique, Argentina; Clay $10,000	Federico Coria; Gabriel Alejandro Hidalgo; 6–4, 6–1	Oscar José Gutierrez; Eduardo Agustín Torre	Gabriel Alejandro Hidalgo; Maximiliano Estévez	Gaston Arturo Grimolizzi; Eduardo Agustín Torre; Luciano Doria; Joaquin Jesús Monteferrario
September 8	Croatia F17 Futures; Bol, Croatia; Clay $10,000	Janez Semrajc; 6–2, 5–7, 6–3	Maxime Tabatruong	Tim Nekic; Adrian Obert	Daniele Capecchi; Riccardo Bellotti; Riccardo Bonadio; Samuel Bensoussan
September 8	Croatia F17 Futures; Bol, Croatia; Clay $10,000	Christopher O'Connell; Jonny O'Mara; 6–2, 6–4	Blaž Bizjak; Peter Mick	Tim Nekic; Adrian Obert	Daniele Capecchi; Riccardo Bellotti; Riccardo Bonadio; Samuel Bensoussan
September 8	Italy F31 Futures; Santa Margherita di Pula, Italy; Clay $10,000	Florian Fallert; 6–1, 3–6, 6–3	Gianluca Mager	Filippo Leonardi; Francesco Picco	Davide Della Tommasina; Marcos Giraldi Requena; Alessandro Bega; Lukas Jastraunig
September 8	Italy F31 Futures; Santa Margherita di Pula, Italy; Clay $10,000	Federico Maccari; Gianluca Mager; 3–6, 6–4, [10–6]	Marcos Giraldi Requena; Gonçalo Oliveira	Filippo Leonardi; Francesco Picco	Davide Della Tommasina; Marcos Giraldi Requena; Alessandro Bega; Lukas Jastraunig
September 8	Peru F6 Futures; Lima, Peru; Clay $10,000	Tiago Lopes; 1–6, 6–2, 6–3	Juan Carlos Sáez	Carlos Eduardo Severino; Juan Pablo Varillas	Jorge Aguilar; Cristóbal Saavedra Corvalán; Rodrigo Sánchez; Duilio Beretta
September 8	Peru F6 Futures; Lima, Peru; Clay $10,000	Fabrício Neis; Alexandre Tsuchiya; 7–5, 6–4	Devin McCarthy; Rodrigo Sánchez	Carlos Eduardo Severino; Juan Pablo Varillas	Jorge Aguilar; Cristóbal Saavedra Corvalán; Rodrigo Sánchez; Duilio Beretta
September 8	Serbia F12 Futures; Subotica, Serbia; Clay $10,000	Dejan Katić; 6–4, 6–2	Tomislav Jotovski	Ilija Vučić; Juraj Masár	Dimitar Grabul; Pirmin Hänle; Danilo Petrović; Dušan Lojda
September 8	Serbia F12 Futures; Subotica, Serbia; Clay $10,000	Georgyi Malyshev; Marcel Waloch; 6–3, 4–6, [10–7]	Antonio Cembellin Prieto; Alexandre Massa	Ilija Vučić; Juraj Masár	Dimitar Grabul; Pirmin Hänle; Danilo Petrović; Dušan Lojda
September 8	Spain F26 Futures; Madrid, Spain; Hard $10,000	Mate Pavić; 6–3, 6–1	Iván Arenas Gualda	Jaime Pulgar García; Mateo Nicolás Martínez	Ricardo Villacorta Alonso; Benjamin Bonzi; Jaume Pla Malfeito; Ivan Gakhov
September 8	Spain F26 Futures; Madrid, Spain; Hard $10,000	Pedro Martínez; Jaume Munar; 6–3, 6–4	Adam Sanjurjo Hermida; Miguel Semmler	Jaime Pulgar García; Mateo Nicolás Martínez	Ricardo Villacorta Alonso; Benjamin Bonzi; Jaume Pla Malfeito; Ivan Gakhov
September 8	Turkey F31 Futures; Antalya, Turkey; Hard $10,000	Nikala Scholtz; 6–4, 3–6, 7–6^{(7–2)}	Rémi Boutillier	Hugo Grenier; Peter Heller	Kittipong Wachiramanowong; Keita Koyama; Richard Gabb; Ruan Roelofse
September 8	Turkey F31 Futures; Antalya, Turkey; Hard $10,000	Ruan Roelofse; Issam Haitham Taweel; 2–6, 6–1, [10–4]	Bastien Favier; Hugo Grenier	Hugo Grenier; Peter Heller	Kittipong Wachiramanowong; Keita Koyama; Richard Gabb; Ruan Roelofse
September 8	USA F24 Futures; Claremont, United States; Hard $10,000	Dennis Nevolo; 6–4, 6–2	Salvatore Caruso	Jean-Yves Aubone; Roberto Quiroz	Jeff Dadamo; Ty Trombetta; Reilly Opelka; Daniel Garza
September 8	USA F24 Futures; Claremont, United States; Hard $10,000	Jeff Dadamo; Dennis Nevolo; 5–2, ret.	Deiton Baughman; Reilly Opelka	Jean-Yves Aubone; Roberto Quiroz	Jeff Dadamo; Ty Trombetta; Reilly Opelka; Daniel Garza
September 15	Canada F11 Futures; Markham, Canada; Hard (indoor) $15,000	Farris Fathi Gosea; 7–6^{(10–8)}, 3–6, 6–4	Philip Bester	Jason Jung; Fritz Wolmarans	Ryan Shane; Dimitar Kutrovsky; Evan King; Harry Bourchier
September 15	Canada F11 Futures; Markham, Canada; Hard (indoor) $15,000	Matt Seeberger; Rudolf Siwy; 6–2, 6–3	Filip Peliwo; Daniel Skripnik	Jason Jung; Fritz Wolmarans	Ryan Shane; Dimitar Kutrovsky; Evan King; Harry Bourchier
September 15	Colombia F6 Futures; Armenia, Colombia; Clay $15,000	Nicolás Barrientos; 6–4, 6–2	José Hernández	Marco Bortolotti; Juan Pablo Varillas	Felipe Escobar; Felipe Mantilla; Daniel Elahi Galán; Pedro Bernardi
September 15	Colombia F6 Futures; Armenia, Colombia; Clay $15,000	Juan Pablo Guzmán; José Hernández; 6–3, 2–6, [12–10]	Marco Bortolotti; Keith-Patrick Crowley	Marco Bortolotti; Juan Pablo Varillas	Felipe Escobar; Felipe Mantilla; Daniel Elahi Galán; Pedro Bernardi
September 15	France F19 Futures; Plaisir, France; Hard (indoor) $15,000+H	Niels Desein; 6–1, 7–6^{(7–4)}	Josselin Ouanna	Jeremy Jahn; Julien Cagnina	David Guez; Erik Crepaldi; Maxime Authom; Quentin Halys
September 15	France F19 Futures; Plaisir, France; Hard (indoor) $15,000+H	Olivier Charroin; Denis Matsukevich; 6–4, 6–3	Julien Cagnina; Julien Dubail	Jeremy Jahn; Julien Cagnina	David Guez; Erik Crepaldi; Maxime Authom; Quentin Halys
September 15	Sweden F4 Futures; Danderyd, Sweden; Hard (indoor) $15,000	Jürgen Zopp; 7–6^{(8–6)}, 6–4	Peter Kobelt	Matteo Donati; Isak Arvidsson	Jacob Adaktusson; Tom Kočevar-Dešman; Mikael Ymer; Ilya Ivashka
September 15	Sweden F4 Futures; Danderyd, Sweden; Hard (indoor) $15,000	Sriram Balaji; Patrik Rosenholm; 6–4, 6–4	Jacob Adaktusson; Tobias Blomgren	Matteo Donati; Isak Arvidsson	Jacob Adaktusson; Tom Kočevar-Dešman; Mikael Ymer; Ilya Ivashka
September 15	Argentina F18 Futures; Buenos Aires, Argentina; Clay $10,000	Federico Coria; 6–2, 3–6, 7–6^{(7–4)}	Juan Ignacio Ameal	Patricio Heras; Juan Pablo Ficovich	Hernán Casanova; Eduardo Agustín Torre; Juan Pablo Paz; Federico Moreno
September 15	Argentina F18 Futures; Buenos Aires, Argentina; Clay $10,000	Juan Ignacio Galarza; Juan Pablo Paz; 7–6^{(7–4)}, 6–3	Hernán Casanova; Eduardo Agustín Torre	Patricio Heras; Juan Pablo Ficovich	Hernán Casanova; Eduardo Agustín Torre; Juan Pablo Paz; Federico Moreno
September 15	Bolivia F1 Futures; Cochabamba, Bolivia; Clay $10,000	Ryūsei Makiguchi; 7–6^{(7–2)}, 1–6, 6–4	Christopher Díaz Figueroa	Federico Zeballos; Franco Feitt	Nicolás Alberto Arreche; Rodrigo Banzer; Alejandro Mendoza; Duilio Vallebuona
September 15	Bolivia F1 Futures; Cochabamba, Bolivia; Clay $10,000	Franco Feitt; Duilio Vallebuona; 6–2, 7–6^{(7–3)}	Augusto Laranja; Alexandre Tsuchiya	Federico Zeballos; Franco Feitt	Nicolás Alberto Arreche; Rodrigo Banzer; Alejandro Mendoza; Duilio Vallebuona
September 15	Croatia F18 Futures; Bol, Croatia; Clay $10,000	Janez Semrajc; 6–4, 7–6^{(7–4)}	Adrian Partl	Toni Androić; Germain Gigounon	Tim Nekic; Romain Arneodo; Riccardo Sinicropi; Javier Martí
September 15	Croatia F18 Futures; Bol, Croatia; Clay $10,000	Janez Semrajc; Tomislav Ternar; 3–6, 6–3, [12–10]	Riccardo Bellotti; Riccardo Sinicropi	Toni Androić; Germain Gigounon	Tim Nekic; Romain Arneodo; Riccardo Sinicropi; Javier Martí
September 15	Italy F32 Futures; Santa Margherita di Pula, Italy; Clay $10,000	Walter Trusendi; 6–1, 3–6, 6–1	Yannick Maden	Johan-Sébastien Tatlot; Claudio Fortuna	Lukas Jastraunig; Pietro Rondoni; Gianluca Mager; Cristian Carli
September 15	Italy F32 Futures; Santa Margherita di Pula, Italy; Clay $10,000	Walter Trusendi; Matteo Volante; 6–2, 7–6^{(7–4)}	Lorenzo Frigerio; Giorgio Portaluri	Johan-Sébastien Tatlot; Claudio Fortuna	Lukas Jastraunig; Pietro Rondoni; Gianluca Mager; Cristian Carli
September 15	Serbia F13 Futures; Niš, Serbia; Clay $10,000	Laslo Djere; 7–6^{(8–6)}, 6–4	Ivan Bjelica	Marko Tepavac; Pietro Licciardi	Nikola Milojević; Dejan Katić; Petar Čonkić; Tomislav Jotovski
September 15	Serbia F13 Futures; Niš, Serbia; Clay $10,000	Ivan Sabanov; Matej Sabanov; 6–4, 6–2	Dimitar Grabul; Tomislav Jotovski	Marko Tepavac; Pietro Licciardi	Nikola Milojević; Dejan Katić; Petar Čonkić; Tomislav Jotovski
September 15	Spain F27 Futures; Madrid, Spain; Hard $10,000	Marcus Willis; 6–3, 6–2	Mick Lescure	Jaime Pulgar García; Mateo Nicolás Martínez	Ricardo Ojeda Lara; Albert Alcaraz Ivorra; Mate Pavić; Iván Arenas Gualda
September 15	Spain F27 Futures; Madrid, Spain; Hard $10,000	Iván Arenas Gualda; Jaime Pulgar García; 6–2, 6–4	Juan Samuel Arauzo Martínez; Jorge Hernando Ruano	Jaime Pulgar García; Mateo Nicolás Martínez	Ricardo Ojeda Lara; Albert Alcaraz Ivorra; Mate Pavić; Iván Arenas Gualda
September 15	Turkey F32 Futures; Antalya, Turkey; Hard $10,000	Ramkumar Ramanathan; 6–4, 7–6^{(10–8)}	Rémi Boutillier	Matija Pecotić; Hiroyasu Ehara	Lee Duck-hee; Richard Gabb; Peter Heller; Jack Carpenter
September 15	Turkey F32 Futures; Antalya, Turkey; Hard $10,000	Scott Clayton; Richard Gabb; 3–6, 7–6^{(7–4)}, [10–7]	Hiroyasu Ehara; Katsuki Nagao	Matija Pecotić; Hiroyasu Ehara	Lee Duck-hee; Richard Gabb; Peter Heller; Jack Carpenter
September 15	USA F25 Futures; Costa Mesa, United States; Hard $10,000	Jarmere Jenkins; 6–4, 6–2	Dennis Novikov	Jeff Dadamo; Tennys Sandgren	Matt Reid; Dennis Nevolo; Ty Trombetta; Clay Thompson
September 15	USA F25 Futures; Costa Mesa, United States; Hard $10,000	Jeremy Hunter Nicholas; Junior Alexander Ore; 4–6, 6–4, [10–8]	Mackenzie McDonald; Martin Redlicki	Jeff Dadamo; Tennys Sandgren	Matt Reid; Dennis Nevolo; Ty Trombetta; Clay Thompson
September 22	Spain F28 Futures; Seville, Spain; Clay $15,000	Daniel Masur; 7–5, 6–3	Pedro Cachin	Oriol Roca Batalla; Antal van der Duim	Adria Mas Mascolo; Juan Lizariturry; David Pérez Sanz; Ricardo Ojeda Lara
September 22	Spain F28 Futures; Seville, Spain; Clay $15,000	Ricardo Ojeda Lara; David Pérez Sanz; 6–1, 7–6^{(7–4)}	Arkadiusz Kocyła; Hassan Ndayishimiye	Oriol Roca Batalla; Antal van der Duim	Adria Mas Mascolo; Juan Lizariturry; David Pérez Sanz; Ricardo Ojeda Lara
September 22	Sweden F5 Futures; Falun, Sweden; Hard (indoor) $15,000	Edward Corrie; 6–4, 6–2	Patrik Rosenholm	Jürgen Zopp; Ilya Ivashka	Lewis Burton; Jonathan Mridha; Peter Kobelt; Christoffer Solberg
September 22	Sweden F5 Futures; Falun, Sweden; Hard (indoor) $15,000	Lewis Burton; Edward Corrie; 7–6^{(7–1)}, 6–1	Sriram Balaji; Patrik Rosenholm	Jürgen Zopp; Ilya Ivashka	Lewis Burton; Jonathan Mridha; Peter Kobelt; Christoffer Solberg
September 22	Bolivia F2 Futures; La Paz, Bolivia; Clay $10,000	Matías Zukas; 6–3, 6–0	Federico Zeballos	Christopher Díaz Figueroa; Ryūsei Makiguchi	Alexandre Tsuchiya; Murkel Alejandro Dellien Velasco; Francisco Bahamonde; Leandro Portmann
September 22	Bolivia F2 Futures; La Paz, Bolivia; Clay $10,000	Franco Feitt; Duilio Vallebuona; 7–5, 6–0	Christopher Díaz Figueroa; Luis Patiño	Christopher Díaz Figueroa; Ryūsei Makiguchi	Alexandre Tsuchiya; Murkel Alejandro Dellien Velasco; Francisco Bahamonde; Leandro Portmann
September 22	Croatia F19 Futures; Bol, Croatia; Clay $10,000	Duje Kekez; 6–3, 6–0	Jan Šátral	Kirill Dmitriev; Ljubomir Čelebić	Tomislav Draganja; Javier Martí; Adrian Partl; Václav Šafránek
September 22	Croatia F19 Futures; Bol, Croatia; Clay $10,000	Libor Salaba; Jan Šátral; 6–4, 6–1	Kirill Dmitriev; Tristan-Samuel Weissborn	Kirill Dmitriev; Ljubomir Čelebić	Tomislav Draganja; Javier Martí; Adrian Partl; Václav Šafránek
September 22	France F20 Futures; Sarreguemines, France; Carpet (indoor) $10,000	Yaraslav Shyla; 6–2, 6–3	Florian Fallert	Hugo Nys; Stefano Napolitano	Moritz Baumann; Ugo Nastasi; Andrei Vasilevski; Hugo Grenier
September 22	France F20 Futures; Sarreguemines, France; Carpet (indoor) $10,000	Erik Crepaldi; Pirmin Hänle; 7–6^{(7–5)}, 7–6^{(7–3)}	Hugo Nys; Élie Rousset	Hugo Nys; Stefano Napolitano	Moritz Baumann; Ugo Nastasi; Andrei Vasilevski; Hugo Grenier
September 22	Italy F33 Futures; Santa Margherita di Pula, Italy; Clay $10,000	Omar Giacalone; 2–6, 6–2, 7–5	Gianluca Mager	Nicola Ghedin; Gonçalo Oliveira	Antonio Campo; Johan-Sébastien Tatlot; Alberto Cammarata; Yannick Maden
September 22	Italy F33 Futures; Santa Margherita di Pula, Italy; Clay $10,000	Omar Giacalone; Pietro Rondoni; 7–5, 6–1	Gianluca Mager; Gonçalo Oliveira	Nicola Ghedin; Gonçalo Oliveira	Antonio Campo; Johan-Sébastien Tatlot; Alberto Cammarata; Yannick Maden
September 22	Portugal F7 Futures; Castelo Branco, Portugal; Hard $10,000	Alexander Ward; 6–3, 3–6, 6–3	Calvin Hemery	Joshua Ward-Hibbert; Andrés Artuñedo	Thomas Bréchemier; Ricardo Villacorta Alonso; João Domingues; Vasco Mensurado
September 22	Portugal F7 Futures; Castelo Branco, Portugal; Hard $10,000	Luke Bambridge; Joshua Ward-Hibbert; 7–6^{(7–0)}, 6–4	Iván Arenas Gualda; Jaime Pulgar García	Joshua Ward-Hibbert; Andrés Artuñedo	Thomas Bréchemier; Ricardo Villacorta Alonso; João Domingues; Vasco Mensurado
September 22	Serbia F14 Futures; Sokobanja, Serbia; Clay $10,000	Ivan Bjelica; 6–4, 6–3	Dejan Katić	Jules Marie; Dimitar Grabul	Marko Tepavac; Dragoș Dima; Miki Janković; Gleb Sakharov
September 22	Serbia F14 Futures; Sokobanja, Serbia; Clay $10,000	Ivan Sabanov; Matej Sabanov; 6–2, 6–2	Georgyi Malyshev; Marcel Waloch	Jules Marie; Dimitar Grabul	Marko Tepavac; Dragoș Dima; Miki Janković; Gleb Sakharov
September 22	Turkey F33 Futures; Antalya, Turkey; Hard $10,000	Ramkumar Ramanathan; 6–3, 6–0	Ricardo Rodríguez	Anıl Yüksel; Jack Carpenter	Hiroyasu Ehara; Dzmitry Zhyrmont; Benjamin Bonzi; Matija Pecotić
September 22	Turkey F33 Futures; Antalya, Turkey; Hard $10,000	Scott Clayton; Richard Gabb; 7–5, 7–6^{(9–7)}	Ramkumar Ramanathan; Ricardo Rodríguez	Anıl Yüksel; Jack Carpenter	Hiroyasu Ehara; Dzmitry Zhyrmont; Benjamin Bonzi; Matija Pecotić
September 22	USA F26 Futures; Irvine, United States; Hard $10,000	Dennis Nevolo; 6–7^{(17–19)}, 7–5, 6–3	Alexander Sarkissian	Jason Jung; Greg Jones	Gregory Ouellette; Farris Fathi Gosea; Taylor Harry Fritz; Kyle McMorrow
September 22	USA F26 Futures; Irvine, United States; Hard $10,000	Greg Jones; Gregory Ouellette; 6–2, 4–6, [10–5]	Carsten Ball; Junior Alexander Ore	Jason Jung; Greg Jones	Gregory Ouellette; Farris Fathi Gosea; Taylor Harry Fritz; Kyle McMorrow
September 29	Australia F6 Futures; Alice Springs, Australia; Hard $15,000	Brydan Klein; 6–1, 6–4	Dayne Kelly	Steven de Waard; Dane Propoggia	Jarmere Jenkins; Daniel Guccione; Takuto Niki; Mitchell Krueger
September 29	Australia F6 Futures; Alice Springs, Australia; Hard $15,000	Jarmere Jenkins; Mitchell Krueger; 6–4, 6–4	Brydan Klein; Dane Propoggia	Steven de Waard; Dane Propoggia	Jarmere Jenkins; Daniel Guccione; Takuto Niki; Mitchell Krueger
September 29	France F21 Futures; Nevers, France; Hard (indoor) $15,000	Niels Desein; 6–1, 6–7^{(7–9)}, 6–2	Enzo Couacaud	Constantin Belot; Filip Peliwo	Grégoire Jacq; Laurent Lokoli; Sébastien Boltz; Moritz Baumann
September 29	France F21 Futures; Nevers, France; Hard (indoor) $15,000	Olivier Charroin; Hugo Nys; 6–4, 6–4	Romano Frantzen; Darren Walsh	Constantin Belot; Filip Peliwo	Grégoire Jacq; Laurent Lokoli; Sébastien Boltz; Moritz Baumann
September 29	Sweden F6 Futures; Jönköping, Sweden; Hard (indoor) $15,000	Edward Corrie; 3–6, 6–3, 6–3	Jürgen Zopp	Matteo Donati; Adrien Bossel	Jesper Brunström; Joshua Milton; Patrik Rosenholm; Isak Arvidsson
September 29	Sweden F6 Futures; Jönköping, Sweden; Hard (indoor) $15,000	David O'Hare; Joe Salisbury; 7–6^{(10–8)}, 7–6^{(7–3)}	Isak Arvidsson; Markus Eriksson	Matteo Donati; Adrien Bossel	Jesper Brunström; Joshua Milton; Patrik Rosenholm; Isak Arvidsson
September 29	Bolivia F3 Futures; Santa Cruz, Bolivia; Clay $10,000	Hugo Dellien; 6–3, 6–4	Christopher Díaz Figueroa	Maximiliano Estévez; Federico Zeballos	Franco Feitt; Sebastián Exequiel Pini; Alexandre Tsuchiya; Matías Zukas
September 29	Bolivia F3 Futures; Santa Cruz, Bolivia; Clay $10,000	Maximiliano Estévez; Franco Feitt; 7–6^{(9–7)}, 7–5	Christopher Díaz Figueroa; Luis Patiño	Maximiliano Estévez; Federico Zeballos	Franco Feitt; Sebastián Exequiel Pini; Alexandre Tsuchiya; Matías Zukas
September 29	Chile F4 Futures; Santiago, Chile; Clay $10,000	Jorge Aguilar; 7–6^{(7–4)}, 6–4	José Pereira	Guillermo Rivera Aránguiz; Federico Coria	Hans Podlipnik Castillo; Matías Sborowitz; Mariano Kestelboim; Cristóbal Saavedra Corvalán
September 29	Chile F4 Futures; Santiago, Chile; Clay $10,000	Fabrício Neis; José Pereira; 6–1, 6–1	Cristóbal Saavedra Corvalán; Ricardo Urzúa Rivera	Guillermo Rivera Aránguiz; Federico Coria	Hans Podlipnik Castillo; Matías Sborowitz; Mariano Kestelboim; Cristóbal Saavedra Corvalán
September 29	Croatia F20 Futures; Solin, Croatia; Clay $10,000	Janez Semrajc; 6–4, 6–1	Duje Kekez	Marko Osmakcic; Marek Michalička	Dmitry Popko; Riccardo Bellotti; Nino Serdarušić; Gianluigi Quinzi
September 29	Croatia F20 Futures; Solin, Croatia; Clay $10,000	Riccardo Bellotti; Thomas Statzberger; 3–6, 6–4, [10–4]	Tim Nekic; Antun Vidak	Marko Osmakcic; Marek Michalička	Dmitry Popko; Riccardo Bellotti; Nino Serdarušić; Gianluigi Quinzi
September 29	Germany F14 Futures; Hambach, Germany; Carpet (indoor) $10,000	Jan Mertl; 6–2, 6–1	Yannick Jankovits	Mārtiņš Podžus; Florian Fallert	Peter Kobelt; Bastian Wagner; Christian Trubrig; Kevin Krawietz
September 29	Germany F14 Futures; Hambach, Germany; Carpet (indoor) $10,000	Johannes Härteis; Hannes Wagner; 6–2, 7–6^{(7–4)}	Peter Kobelt; Connor Smith	Mārtiņš Podžus; Florian Fallert	Peter Kobelt; Bastian Wagner; Christian Trubrig; Kevin Krawietz
September 29	Italy F34 Futures; Pula, Italy; Clay $10,000	Walter Trusendi; 3–6, 6–4, 6–4	Andrea Basso	Yannick Maden; Johan-Sébastien Tatlot	Giulio Torroni; Grzegorz Panfil; Maxime Chazal; Filippo Leonardi
September 29	Italy F34 Futures; Pula, Italy; Clay $10,000	Daniele Capecchi; Gonçalo Oliveira; 2–6, 6–1, [11–9]	Pietro Rondoni; Walter Trusendi	Yannick Maden; Johan-Sébastien Tatlot	Giulio Torroni; Grzegorz Panfil; Maxime Chazal; Filippo Leonardi
September 29	Kazakhstan F12 Futures; Shymkent, Kazakhstan; Clay $10,000	Ivan Gakhov; 6–4, 6–0	Enrique López Pérez	Maxime Hamou; Leon Schutt	Moos Sporken; Alexandar Lazov; Filip Horanský; Jeevan Nedunchezhiyan
September 29	Kazakhstan F12 Futures; Shymkent, Kazakhstan; Clay $10,000	Enrique López Pérez; Jeevan Nedunchezhiyan; 7–5, 6–0	Yurii Dzhavakian; Olexiy Kolisnyk	Maxime Hamou; Leon Schutt	Moos Sporken; Alexandar Lazov; Filip Horanský; Jeevan Nedunchezhiyan
September 29	Portugal F8 Futures; Oliveira de Azeméis, Portugal; Hard $10,000	Jaime Pulgar García; 6–2, 6–3	Viktor Durasovic	Alexander Ward; Romain Barbosa	Andrés Artuñedo; João Domingues; David Pérez Sanz; Frederico Ferreira Silva
September 29	Portugal F8 Futures; Oliveira de Azeméis, Portugal; Hard $10,000	Frederico Gil; Leonardo Tavares; 6–1, 3–6, [10–4]	Romain Barbosa; Frederico Ferreira Silva	Alexander Ward; Romain Barbosa	Andrés Artuñedo; João Domingues; David Pérez Sanz; Frederico Ferreira Silva
September 29	Spain F29 Futures; Sabadell, Spain; Clay $10,000	Roberto Carballés Baena; 6–4, 6–4	Pedro Cachin	Alexis Musialek; Gerard Granollers	Juan Lizariturry; Antal van der Duim; Oriol Roca Batalla; Jordi Samper Montaña
September 29	Spain F29 Futures; Sabadell, Spain; Clay $10,000	Eduard Esteve Lobato; Gerard Granollers; 4–6, 6–3, [10–6]	Juan Lizariturry; Oriol Roca Batalla	Alexis Musialek; Gerard Granollers	Juan Lizariturry; Antal van der Duim; Oriol Roca Batalla; Jordi Samper Montaña
September 29	Turkey F34 Futures; Antalya, Turkey; Hard $10,000	Jan Hernych; 6–3, 7–5	Ricardo Rodríguez	Ivan Nedelko; Takashi Saito	Chen Ti; Benjamin Bonzi; Ramkumar Ramanathan; Richard Gabb
September 29	Turkey F34 Futures; Antalya, Turkey; Hard $10,000	Tuna Altuna; Ramkumar Ramanathan; 6–4, 6–2	Barış Ergüden; Jan Hájek	Ivan Nedelko; Takashi Saito	Chen Ti; Benjamin Bonzi; Ramkumar Ramanathan; Richard Gabb
