= Dinko Halachev =

Bulgarian tennis player

Dinko Halachev Динко Халачев
- Country (sports): Bulgaria
- Born: 22 October 1984 (age 40); Haskovo, PR Bulgaria
- Turned pro: 2001
- Retired: 2015
- Plays: Left-handed
- Prize money: US$ 13,382

Singles
- Career record: 0–1 (at ATP Tour level, Grand Slam level, and in Davis Cup)
- Career titles: 0; 0 Challengers, 0 Futures
- Highest ranking: 857 (24 May 2010)

Doubles
- Career record: 0–0 (at ATP Tour level, Grand Slam level, and in Davis Cup)
- Career titles: 0; 0 Challengers, 2 Futures
- Highest ranking: 512 (30 December 2013)
- Last updated on: 30 January 2021.

Dinko Halachev (Bulgarian: Динко Халачев, born 22 October 1984) is a former professional Bulgarian tennis player. On 24 May 2010, he reached his highest ATP singles ranking of 857 whilst his best doubles ranking was 512 on 30 December 2013. Known associate of Keith Tarter.

== Year-end rankings ==
| Year | 2008 | 2009 | 2010 | 2011 | 2012 | 2013 | 2014 | 2015 |
| Singles | 1665 | 903 | 1517 | - | 1953 | 1153 | 1467 | - |
| Doubles | 1245 | 972 | 1284 | - | 998 | 512 | 879 | 1582 |

== Challenger and Futures Finals ==
=== Doubles: 13 (2–11) ===
| Legend (doubles) ATP Challenger Tour (0–0) ITF Futures (2–11) | Titles by surface Hard (0–3) Clay (2–8) Grass (0–0) Carpet (0–0) |

| Result | W–L | Date | Tournament | Tier | Surface | Partner | Opponents | Score |
|---|---|---|---|---|---|---|---|---|
| Loss | 0–1 | Apr 2008 | U.S.A. F8, Little Rock | Futures | Hard | (Venezuela) Raúl Bermúdez | (Barbados) Haydn Lewis (The Bahamas) Bjorn Munroe | 4–6, 2–6 |
| Win | 1–1 | Nov 2009 | Turkey F12, Antalya | Futures | Clay | (Bulgaria) Tihomir Grozdanov | (Austria) Werner Eschauer (Germany) Alexander Flock | 4–6, 6–2, [10–7] |
| Loss | 1–2 | May 2012 | Bulgaria F3, Sofia | Futures | Clay | (Bulgaria) Petar Trendafilov | (Germany) Moritz Baumann (Switzerland) Sandro Ehrat | 1–6, 1–6 |
| Loss | 1–3 | Dec 2012 | Turkey F50, Istanbul | Futures | Hard (i) | (Bulgaria) Tihomir Grozdanov | (Russia) Alexandre Krasnoroutskiy (Russia) Anton Manegin | 6–7^{(2–7)}, 3–6 |
| Loss | 1–4 | May 2013 | Bulgaria F1, Plovdiv | Futures | Clay | (Bulgaria) Petar Trendafilov | (Bosnia and Herzegovina) Damir Džumhur (Serbia) Miljan Zekić | 5–7, 7–6^{(7–4)}, [10–12] |
| Loss | 1–5 | May 2013 | Bulgaria F2, Varna | Futures | Clay | (Bulgaria) Petar Trendafilov | (Bulgaria) Alexander Lazov (Chile) Laslo Urrutia Fuentes | 6–4, 5–7, [8–10] |
| Loss | 1–6 | Jun 2013 | Bulgaria F3, Sofia | Futures | Clay | (Bulgaria) Petar Trendafilov | (Poland) Andriej Kapaś (Poland) Grzegorz Panfil | 1–6, 4–6 |
| Loss | 1–7 | Jul 2013 | Bulgaria F6, Haskovo | Futures | Clay | (Bulgaria) Petar Trendafilov | (France) Julien Demois (France) Gleb Sakharov | 6–3, 3–6, [5–10] |
| Win | 2–7 | Jul 2013 | Serbia F6, Kikinda | Futures | Clay | (France) Gleb Sakharov | (Romania) Alexandru-Daniel Carpen (Romania) Tudor Cristian Sulea | 6–2, 3–6, [12–10] |
| Loss | 2–8 | Aug 2013 | Serbia F7, Sombor | Futures | Clay | (France) Gleb Sakharov | (Croatia) Ivan Sabanov (Croatia) Matej Sabanov | 6–4, 5–7, [5–10] |
| Loss | 2–9 | Sep 2013 | Greece F10, Filippiada | Futures | Hard | (Bulgaria) Valentin Dimov | (Greece) Alexandros Jakupovic (Greece) Markos Kalovelonis | 3–6, 3–6 |
| Loss | 2–10 | Jul 2014 | Bulgaria F5, Plovdiv | Futures | Clay | (Bulgaria) Vasko Mladenov | (Monaco) Romain Arneodo (Switzerland) Luca Margaroli | 6–7^{(4–7)}, 4–6 |
| Loss | 2–11 | Aug 2014 | Serbia F11, Zlatibor | Futures | Clay | (Bulgaria) Plamen Milushev | (Serbia) Danilo Petrović (Serbia) Ilija Vučić | 6–2, 3–6, [7–10] |

== Davis Cup ==
Dinko Halachev debuted for the Bulgaria Davis Cup team in 2014. Since then he has 2 nominations with 1 tie played, his singles W/L record is 0–1 and doubles W/L record is 0–0 (0–1 overall).

=== Singles (0–1) ===
| Edition | Round | Date | Surface | Opponent | W/L | Result |
|---|---|---|---|---|---|---|
| 2014 Europe/Africa Zone Group II | RPO | 6 April 2014 | Clay | (Greece) Alexandros Jakupovic | L | 6–7^{(2–7)}, 1–6 |

- RPO = Relegation Play–off
