= Petar Trendafilov =

Bulgarian tennis player (born 1984)

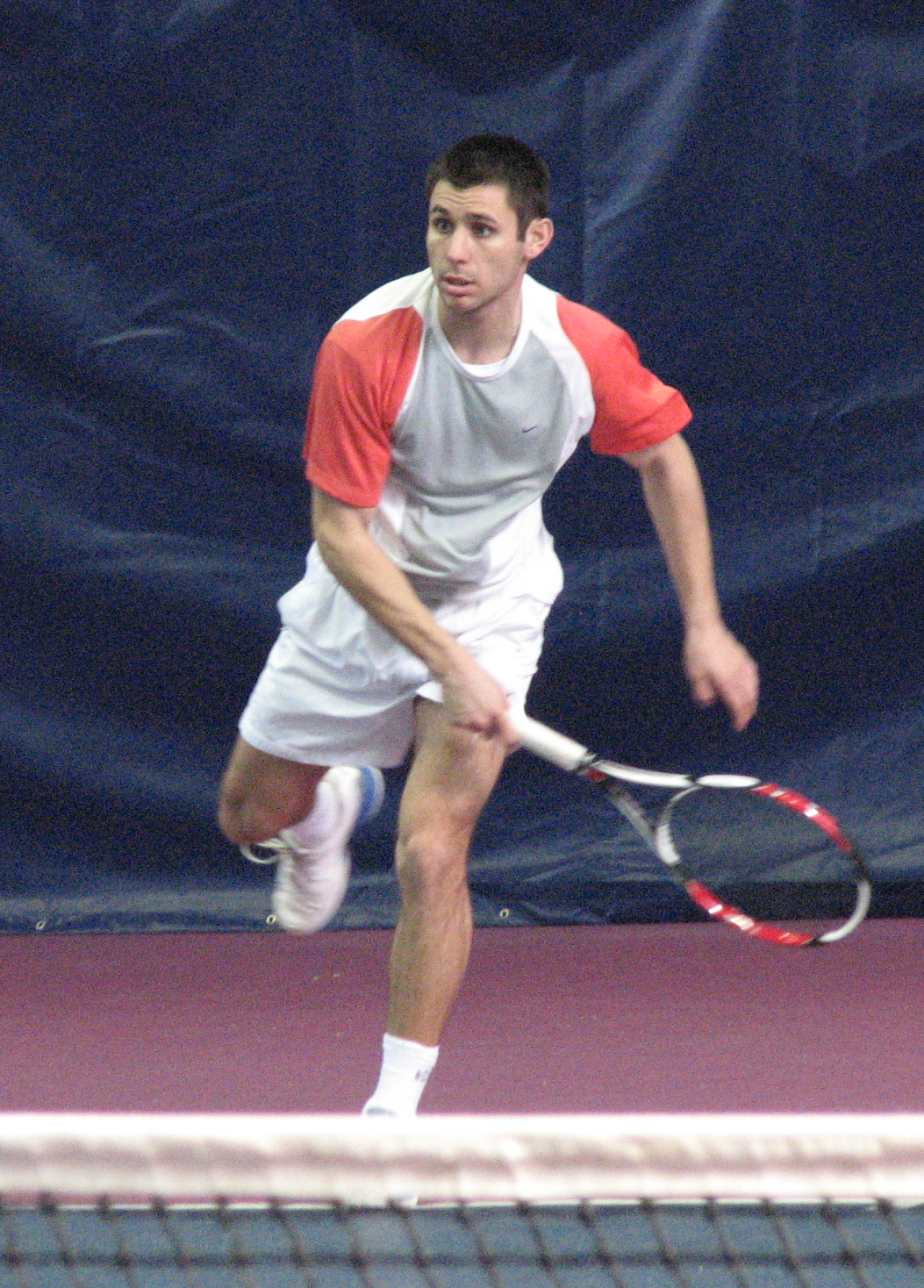
- Trendafilov in 2010
- Country (sports): Bulgaria
- Residence: Sofia
- Born: 11 September 1984 (age 41) Dimitrovgrad, Bulgaria
- Height: 181.5 m (595 ft 6 in)
- Turned pro: 2000
- Retired: 2016
- Plays: Right-handed (two-handed backhand)
- Prize money: US$ 14,479

Singles
- Career record: 0–0 (at ATP Tour level, Grand Slam level, and in Davis Cup)
- Career titles: 0; 0 Challengers, 0 Futures
- Highest ranking: 825 (10 February 2014)

Doubles
- Career record: 0–0 (at ATP Tour level, Grand Slam level, and in Davis Cup)
- Career titles: 0; 0 Challengers, 2 Futures
- Highest ranking: 660 (3 November 2014)
- Last updated on: 31 January 2021.

Petar Trendafilov (Bulgarian: Петър Трендафилов, born 11 September 1984) is a Bulgarian tennis player. On 10 February 2014, he reached his highest ATP singles ranking of 825 whilst his best doubles ranking was 660 on 3 November 2014.

== Year-end rankings ==
Year	2007	2008	2009	2010	2011	2012	2013	2014	2015	2016
Singles	1269	1914	1712	1639	-	1683	849	959	1486	1642
Doubles	-	-	1519	-	-	1095	750	709	1228	-

== Challenger and Futures Finals ==
=== Singles: 1 (0–1) ===
Legend (singles) ATP Challenger Tour (0–0) ITF Futures (0–1)	Titles by surface Hard (0–0) Clay (0–1) Grass (0–0) Carpet (0–0)

Result	W–L	Date	Tournament	Tier	Surface	Opponent	Score
Loss	0–1	Jul 2013	Germany F10, Trier	Futures	Clay	(Belgium) Yannick Mertens	4–6, 2–6

=== Doubles: 7 (2–5) ===
Legend (doubles) ATP Challenger Tour (0–0) ITF Futures (2–5)	Titles by surface Hard (0–0) Clay (2–5) Grass (0–0) Carpet (0–0)

Result	W–L	Date	Tournament	Tier	Surface	Partner	Opponents	Score
Loss	0–1	May 2012	Bulgaria F3, Sofia	Futures	Clay	(Bulgaria) Dinko Halachev	(Germany) Moritz Baumann (Switzerland) Sandro Ehrat	1–6, 1–6
Loss	0–2	May 2013	Bulgaria F1, Plovdiv	Futures	Clay	(Bulgaria) Dinko Halachev	(Bosnia and Herzegovina) Damir Džumhur (Serbia) Miljan Zekić	5–7, 7–6^{(7–4)}, [10–12]
Loss	0–3	May 2013	Bulgaria F2, Varna	Futures	Clay	(Bulgaria) Dinko Halachev	(Bulgaria) Alexander Lazov (Chile) Laslo Urrutia Fuentes	6–4, 5–7, [8–10]
Loss	0–4	Jun 2013	Bulgaria F3, Sofia	Futures	Clay	(Bulgaria) Dinko Halachev	(Poland) Andriej Kapaś (Poland) Grzegorz Panfil	1–6, 4–6
Loss	0–5	Jul 2013	Bulgaria F6, Haskovo	Futures	Clay	(Bulgaria) Dinko Halachev	(France) Julien Demois (France) Gleb Sakharov	6–3, 3–6, [5–10]
Win	1–5	Jul 2014	Germany F6, Saarlouis	Futures	Clay	(Germany) Pirmin Haenle	(Chile) Cristóbal Saavedra (Chile) Ricardo Urzua-Rivera	w/o
Win	2–5	Jul 2014	Germany F8, Trier	Futures	Clay	(Germany) Kevin Kaczynski	(Croatia) Franjo Raspudić (United States) Salar Saraydarpour	6–4, 4–6, [10–8]

== Davis Cup ==
Petar Trendafilov debuted for the Bulgaria Davis Cup team in 2012. Since then he has 1 nomination with 3 ties played, his singles W/L record is 0–0 and doubles W/L record is 3–0 (3–0 overall).

=== Doubles (3–0) ===
Edition	Round	Date	Partner	Surface	Opponents	W/L	Result
2012 Europe Zone Group III	RR	2 May 2012	(Bulgaria) Todor Enev	Clay	(Albania) Flavio Deçe (Albania) Rei Pelushi	W	6–0, 6–2
2012 Europe Zone Group III	RR	4 May 2012	(Bulgaria) Todor Enev	Clay	(Georgia (country)) Aleksandre Metreveli (Georgia (country)) George Tsivadze	W	6–1, 7–6^{(7–4)}
2012 Europe Zone Group III	PPO	5 May 2012	(Bulgaria) Todor Enev	Clay	(North Macedonia) Tomislav Jotovski (North Macedonia) Danil Zelenkov	W	6–3, 6–3

- PPO = Promotion Play–off
- RR = Round Robin
