= 2016 ITF Men's Circuit (October–December) =

The 2016 ITF Men's Circuit is the 2016 edition of the second-tier tour for men's professional tennis. It is organised by the International Tennis Federation and is a tier below the ATP Tour. The ITF Men's Circuit includes tournaments with prize money ranging from $10,000 up to $25,000.

== Key ==
$25,000 tournaments
$10,000 tournaments

== Month ==
=== October ===
Week of	Tournament	Winner	Runners-up	Semifinalists	Quarterfinalists
October 3	Australia F7 Futures; Toowoomba, Australia; Hard $25,000; Singles and doubles draws	(United States) Jarmere Jenkins; 7–6^{(7–5)}, 7–6^{(7–2)}	(Australia) Blake Mott	(Australia) Max Purcell (Australia) Marc Polmans	(Australia) Thomas Fancutt (Australia) Dayne Kelly (Australia) Harry Bourchier (Australia) Alex de Minaur
October 3	Australia F7 Futures; Toowoomba, Australia; Hard $25,000; Singles and doubles draws	(United States) Nathan Pasha (Australia) Darren Polkinghorne; 6–3, 6–4	(Australia) Maverick Banes (Australia) Gavin van Peperzeel	(Australia) Max Purcell (Australia) Marc Polmans	(Australia) Thomas Fancutt (Australia) Dayne Kelly (Australia) Harry Bourchier (Australia) Alex de Minaur
October 3	France F21 Futures; Nevers, France; Hard (indoor) $25,000+H; Singles and doubles draws	(France) Albano Olivetti; 7–6^{(8–6)}, 6–3	(France) Grégoire Jacq	(India) Ramkumar Ramanathan (France) Rémi Boutillier	(France) Mick Lescure (France) Calvin Hemery (France) Hugo Grenier (Czech Republic) Jan Mertl
October 3	France F21 Futures; Nevers, France; Hard (indoor) $25,000+H; Singles and doubles draws	(France) Antoine Hoang (France) Grégoire Jacq; 6–3, 6–4	(Venezuela) Jordi Muñoz Abreu (India) Ramkumar Ramanathan	(India) Ramkumar Ramanathan (France) Rémi Boutillier	(France) Mick Lescure (France) Calvin Hemery (France) Hugo Grenier (Czech Republic) Jan Mertl
October 3	Hungary F8 Futures; Balatonboglár, Hungary; Clay $25,000; Singles and doubles draws	(Hungary) Attila Balázs; 7–6^{(7–2)}, 6–3	(Russia) Alexey Vatutin	(Czech Republic) Pavel Nejedlý (Germany) Peter Torebko	(Austria) Lenny Hampel (India) Sumit Nagal (Bosnia and Herzegovina) Tomislav Brkić (Austria) Sebastian Ofner
October 3	Hungary F8 Futures; Balatonboglár, Hungary; Clay $25,000; Singles and doubles draws	(Hungary) Gábor Borsos (Hungary) Ádám Kellner; 3–6, 6–2, [10–8]	(Czech Republic) Zdeněk Kolář (Czech Republic) Pavel Nejedlý	(Czech Republic) Pavel Nejedlý (Germany) Peter Torebko	(Austria) Lenny Hampel (India) Sumit Nagal (Bosnia and Herzegovina) Tomislav Brkić (Austria) Sebastian Ofner
October 3	Portugal F12 Futures; Porto, Portugal; Clay $25,000; Singles and doubles draws	(Spain) Ricardo Ojeda Lara; 6–3, 1–6, 7–5	(France) Gianni Mina	(Chile) Laslo Urrutia Fuentes (Belgium) Germain Gigounon	(Spain) Miguel Semmler (Italy) Lorenzo Frigerio (France) Maxime Chazal (Spain) Andrés Artuñedo
October 3	Portugal F12 Futures; Porto, Portugal; Clay $25,000; Singles and doubles draws	(Portugal) Fred Gil (Spain) Marc Giner; 3–6, 6–3, [10–3]	(Spain) Marc Fornell (Portugal) Gonçalo Oliveira	(Chile) Laslo Urrutia Fuentes (Belgium) Germain Gigounon	(Spain) Miguel Semmler (Italy) Lorenzo Frigerio (France) Maxime Chazal (Spain) Andrés Artuñedo
October 3	Sweden F5 Futures; Falun, Sweden; Hard (indoor) $25,000; Singles and doubles draws	(Russia) Alexander Bublik; 6–4, 6–4	(United Kingdom) Edward Corrie	(France) Laurent Lokoli (Sweden) Markus Eriksson	(Estonia) Jürgen Zopp (Turkey) Cem İlkel (Netherlands) Tim van Rijthoven (Poland) Andriej Kapaś
October 3	Sweden F5 Futures; Falun, Sweden; Hard (indoor) $25,000; Singles and doubles draws	(Sweden) Isak Arvidsson (Sweden) Fred Simonsson; 7–6^{(7–1)}, 4–6, [11–9]	(Sweden) Markus Eriksson (Sweden) Milos Sekulic	(France) Laurent Lokoli (Sweden) Markus Eriksson	(Estonia) Jürgen Zopp (Turkey) Cem İlkel (Netherlands) Tim van Rijthoven (Poland) Andriej Kapaś
October 3	Colombia F4 Futures; Valledupar, Colombia; Hard $10,000; Singles and doubles draws	(Chile) Marcelo Tomás Barrios Vera; 4–6, 6–3, 7–6^{(7–5)}	(Colombia) Daniel Elahi Galán	(Brazil) Ricardo Hocevar (Colombia) Alejandro Gómez	(Brazil) João Menezes (Argentina) Facundo Mena (Colombia) Sebastián Serrano (Brazil) Nicolas Santos
October 3	Colombia F4 Futures; Valledupar, Colombia; Hard $10,000; Singles and doubles draws	(Brazil) Rafael Matos (Brazil) João Menezes; 6–3, 3–6, [10–5]	(Colombia) José Daniel Bendeck (Argentina) Gregorio Cordonnier	(Brazil) Ricardo Hocevar (Colombia) Alejandro Gómez	(Brazil) João Menezes (Argentina) Facundo Mena (Colombia) Sebastián Serrano (Brazil) Nicolas Santos
October 3	Croatia F9 Futures; Bol, Croatia; Clay $10,000; Singles and doubles draws	(Italy) Riccardo Bellotti; 6–4, 6–1	(France) Alexandre Müller	(Austria) Lucas Miedler (Montenegro) Ljubomir Čelebić	(Croatia) Kristijan Mesaroš (Italy) Gian Marco Moroni (Netherlands) Tim van Terheijden (Bosnia and Herzegovina) Nerman Fatić
October 3	Croatia F9 Futures; Bol, Croatia; Clay $10,000; Singles and doubles draws	(Austria) Pascal Brunner (Austria) Lucas Miedler; 6–2, 6–2	(Slovenia) Nik Razboršek (Croatia) Nino Serdarušić	(Austria) Lucas Miedler (Montenegro) Ljubomir Čelebić	(Croatia) Kristijan Mesaroš (Italy) Gian Marco Moroni (Netherlands) Tim van Terheijden (Bosnia and Herzegovina) Nerman Fatić
October 3	Egypt F27 Futures; Sharm El Sheikh, Egypt; Hard $10,000; Singles and doubles draws	(South Africa) Lloyd Harris; 6–4, 6–2	(Italy) Andrea Vavassori	(Czech Republic) Petr Hájek (Poland) Piotr Matuszewski	(Egypt) Karim-Mohamed Maamoun (Italy) Giorgio Ricca (Poland) Michał Dembek (Egypt) Sherif Sabry
October 3	Egypt F27 Futures; Sharm El Sheikh, Egypt; Hard $10,000; Singles and doubles draws	(Poland) Piotr Matuszewski (Poland) Kacper Żuk; 6–3, 6–2	(Italy) Antonio Massara (Italy) Andrea Vavassori	(Czech Republic) Petr Hájek (Poland) Piotr Matuszewski	(Egypt) Karim-Mohamed Maamoun (Italy) Giorgio Ricca (Poland) Michał Dembek (Egypt) Sherif Sabry
October 3	Germany F13 Futures; Hambach, Germany; Carpet (indoor) $10,000; Singles and doubles draws	(Ukraine) Danylo Kalenichenko; 3–6, 6–1, 7–5	(Czech Republic) Marek Jaloviec	(Germany) Lukas Rüpke (Latvia) Mārtiņš Podžus	(Czech Republic) Michal Konečný (Czech Republic) David Poljak (Bulgaria) Alexandar Lazarov (Germany) Bastian Wagner
October 3	Germany F13 Futures; Hambach, Germany; Carpet (indoor) $10,000; Singles and doubles draws	(Czech Republic) Marek Jaloviec (Czech Republic) Michal Konečný; 5–7, 6–4, [10–6]	(United Kingdom) Keelan Oakley (United Kingdom) Neil Pauffley	(Germany) Lukas Rüpke (Latvia) Mārtiņš Podžus	(Czech Republic) Michal Konečný (Czech Republic) David Poljak (Bulgaria) Alexandar Lazarov (Germany) Bastian Wagner
October 3	Israel F15 Futures; Ramat HaSharon, Israel; Hard $10,000; Singles and doubles draws	(Israel) Amir Weintraub; 6–4, 7–6^{(8–6)}	(United States) Peter Kobelt	(Israel) Mor Bulis (Russia) Roman Safiullin	(United Kingdom) Scott Clayton (Israel) Ben Patael (Ukraine) Volodymyr Uzhylovskyi (United Kingdom) Joshua Paris
October 3	Israel F15 Futures; Ramat HaSharon, Israel; Hard $10,000; Singles and doubles draws	(United Kingdom) Scott Clayton (Israel) Daniel Cukierman; 6–4, 6–3	(Israel) Shahar Elbaz (Ukraine) Volodymyr Uzhylovskyi	(Israel) Mor Bulis (Russia) Roman Safiullin	(United Kingdom) Scott Clayton (Israel) Ben Patael (Ukraine) Volodymyr Uzhylovskyi (United Kingdom) Joshua Paris
October 3	Italy F32 Futures; Pula, Italy; Clay $10,000; Singles and doubles draws	(Germany) Yannick Maden; 2–6, 6–4, 6–3	(Italy) Stefano Travaglia	(France) Corentin Denolly (Italy) Walter Trusendi	(Italy) Filippo Baldi (Italy) Riccardo Bonadio (Italy) Omar Giacalone (United States) Dominic Cotrone
October 3	Italy F32 Futures; Pula, Italy; Clay $10,000; Singles and doubles draws	(France) Samuel Bensoussan (Netherlands) Alban Meuffels; 6–2, 2–6, [10–4]	(United States) Dominic Cotrone (United States) Alex Rybakov	(France) Corentin Denolly (Italy) Walter Trusendi	(Italy) Filippo Baldi (Italy) Riccardo Bonadio (Italy) Omar Giacalone (United States) Dominic Cotrone
October 3	Kazakhstan F7 Futures; Shymkent, Kazakhstan; Clay $10,000; Singles and doubles draws	(Russia) Ivan Gakhov; 6–2, 5–7, 6–2	(Uzbekistan) Sanjar Fayziev	(Russia) Ivan Nedelko (Russia) Alexander Igoshin	(Georgia (country)) George Tsivadze (Russia) Pavel Kotov (Russia) Ivan Davydov (Estonia) Vladimir Ivanov
October 3	Kazakhstan F7 Futures; Shymkent, Kazakhstan; Clay $10,000; Singles and doubles draws	(Russia) Alexander Pavlioutchenkov (Georgia (country)) George Tsivadze; 6–1, 6–4	(Russia) Ivan Davydov (Kazakhstan) Roman Khassanov	(Russia) Ivan Nedelko (Russia) Alexander Igoshin	(Georgia (country)) George Tsivadze (Russia) Pavel Kotov (Russia) Ivan Davydov (Estonia) Vladimir Ivanov
October 3	Tunisia F26 Futures; Hammamet, Tunisia; Clay $10,000; Singles and doubles draws	(Lithuania) Laurynas Grigelis; 6–4, 6–4	(France) Benjamin Bonzi	(Spain) Pol Toledo Bagué (Netherlands) Guy den Heijer	(France) Mathias Bourgue (Italy) Alessandro Petrone (Germany) Marc Sieber (Italy) Fabrizio Ornago
October 3	Tunisia F26 Futures; Hammamet, Tunisia; Clay $10,000; Singles and doubles draws	(Lithuania) Laurynas Grigelis (Spain) David Pérez Sanz; Walkover	(France) Benjamin Bonzi (France) Mathias Bourgue	(Spain) Pol Toledo Bagué (Netherlands) Guy den Heijer	(France) Mathias Bourgue (Italy) Alessandro Petrone (Germany) Marc Sieber (Italy) Fabrizio Ornago
October 3	Ukraine F6 Futures; Kyiv, Ukraine; Hard $10,000; Singles and doubles draws	(Lithuania) Lukas Mugevičius; 7–6^{(7–3)}, 6–3	(Ukraine) Denys Mylokostov	(Italy) Francesco Vilardo (Ukraine) Marat Deviatiarov	(Ukraine) Vladyslav Manafov (Germany) Leon Schütt (Poland) Adrian Andrzejczuk (Germany) Julian Onken
October 3	Ukraine F6 Futures; Kyiv, Ukraine; Hard $10,000; Singles and doubles draws	(Ukraine) Vladyslav Manafov (Lithuania) Lukas Mugevičius; 6–2, 6–2	(Ukraine) Marat Deviatiarov (Italy) Francesco Vilardo	(Italy) Francesco Vilardo (Ukraine) Marat Deviatiarov	(Ukraine) Vladyslav Manafov (Germany) Leon Schütt (Poland) Adrian Andrzejczuk (Germany) Julian Onken
October 10	Australia F8 Futures; Cairns, Australia; Hard $25,000; Singles and doubles draws	(Australia) Christopher O'Connell; 0–6, 6–2, 6–4	(Australia) Blake Mott	(Australia) Dayne Kelly (Australia) Marc Polmans	(Australia) Matthew Barton (Australia) Maverick Banes (Australia) Gavin van Peperzeel (Japan) Yusuke Watanuki
October 10	Australia F8 Futures; Cairns, Australia; Hard $25,000; Singles and doubles draws	(Australia) Marc Polmans (Australia) Luke Saville; 4–6, 6–3, [10–7]	(United States) Nathan Pasha (Australia) Darren Polkinghorne	(Australia) Dayne Kelly (Australia) Marc Polmans	(Australia) Matthew Barton (Australia) Maverick Banes (Australia) Gavin van Peperzeel (Japan) Yusuke Watanuki
October 10	Nigeria F5 Futures; Lagos, Nigeria; Hard $25,000+H; Singles and doubles draws	(Spain) Enrique López Pérez; 6–2, 6–7^{(7–9)}, 6–1	(France) Gianni Mina	(Egypt) Karim-Mohamed Maamoun (India) Sasikumar Mukund	(Netherlands) Boy Westerhof (Nigeria) Sylvester Emmanuel (Nigeria) Clifford Enosoregbe (France) Calvin Hemery
October 10	Nigeria F5 Futures; Lagos, Nigeria; Hard $25,000+H; Singles and doubles draws	(Spain) Enrique López Pérez (Netherlands) Boy Westerhof; 6–2, 6–3	(France) Calvin Hemery (France) Gianni Mina	(Egypt) Karim-Mohamed Maamoun (India) Sasikumar Mukund	(Netherlands) Boy Westerhof (Nigeria) Sylvester Emmanuel (Nigeria) Clifford Enosoregbe (France) Calvin Hemery
October 10	USA F31 Futures; Houston, United States; Hard $25,000; Singles and doubles draws	(United States) Wil Spencer; 6–4, 6–3	(United States) Aron Hiltzik	(India) Yuki Bhambri (Denmark) Frederik Nielsen	(Germany) Sebastian Fanselow (New Zealand) José Statham (Germany) Dominik Köpfer (United States) Connor Smith
October 10	USA F31 Futures; Houston, United States; Hard $25,000; Singles and doubles draws	(Mexico) Hans Hach Verdugo (United States) Rhyne Williams; 6–3, 6–3	(United States) Hunter Reese (United States) Jackson Withrow	(India) Yuki Bhambri (Denmark) Frederik Nielsen	(Germany) Sebastian Fanselow (New Zealand) José Statham (Germany) Dominik Köpfer (United States) Connor Smith
October 10	Chinese Taipei F1 Futures; Kaohsiung, Chinese Taipei; Hard $10,000; Singles and doubles draws	(Japan) Takuto Niki; 6–4, 6–4	(Chinese Taipei) Lee Kuan-yi	(Chinese Taipei) Chen Ti (Japan) Makoto Ochi	(Chinese Taipei) Wu Tung-lin (Chinese Taipei) Meng Cing-yang (Chinese Taipei) Hsu Yu-hsiou (Chinese Taipei) Yu Cheng-yu
October 10	Chinese Taipei F1 Futures; Kaohsiung, Chinese Taipei; Hard $10,000; Singles and doubles draws	(Chinese Taipei) Lee Kuan-yi (Chinese Taipei) Liu Shao-fan; 6–4, 4–6, [10–7]	(Belgium) Jonas Merckx (Italy) Luca Pancaldi	(Chinese Taipei) Chen Ti (Japan) Makoto Ochi	(Chinese Taipei) Wu Tung-lin (Chinese Taipei) Meng Cing-yang (Chinese Taipei) Hsu Yu-hsiou (Chinese Taipei) Yu Cheng-yu
October 10	Colombia F5 Futures; Manizales, Colombia; Clay $10,000; Singles and doubles draws	(Colombia) Alejandro Gómez; 7–6^{(7–4)}, 6–4	(Colombia) Daniel Elahi Galán	(Chile) Guillermo Rivera Aránguiz (Brazil) Ricardo Hocevar	(Chile) Marcelo Tomás Barrios Vera (Chile) Michel Vernier (Brazil) Oscar José Gutierrez (Dominican Republic) José Olivares
October 10	Colombia F5 Futures; Manizales, Colombia; Clay $10,000; Singles and doubles draws	(Colombia) Alejandro Gómez (Colombia) Felipe Mantilla; 6–4, 6–3	(Brazil) Oscar José Gutierrez (Brazil) Wilson Leite	(Chile) Guillermo Rivera Aránguiz (Brazil) Ricardo Hocevar	(Chile) Marcelo Tomás Barrios Vera (Chile) Michel Vernier (Brazil) Oscar José Gutierrez (Dominican Republic) José Olivares
October 10	Croatia F10 Futures; Bol, Croatia; Clay $10,000; Singles and doubles draws	(Italy) Riccardo Bellotti; 6–3, 6–3	(Bosnia and Herzegovina) Tomislav Brkić	(Croatia) Nino Serdarušić (Germany) Pascal Meis	(Bosnia and Herzegovina) Nerman Fatić (North Macedonia) Tomislav Jotovski (Italy) Pietro Licciardi (France) Johan Tatlot
October 10	Croatia F10 Futures; Bol, Croatia; Clay $10,000; Singles and doubles draws	(Croatia) Borna Gojo (Croatia) Nino Serdarušić; 6–3, 6–7^{(11–13)}, [10–5]	(Serbia) Ivan Bjelica (Serbia) Darko Jandrić	(Croatia) Nino Serdarušić (Germany) Pascal Meis	(Bosnia and Herzegovina) Nerman Fatić (North Macedonia) Tomislav Jotovski (Italy) Pietro Licciardi (France) Johan Tatlot
October 10	Czech Republic F7 Futures; Jablonec nad Nisou, Czech Republic; Carpet (indoor) $10,000; Singles and doubles draws	(Czech Republic) Petr Michnev; 3–6, 7–6^{(7–4)}, 6–4	(Netherlands) Niels Lootsma	(Czech Republic) Dominik Kellovský (Austria) David Pichler	(Croatia) Filip Veger (Czech Republic) Tomáš Papík (Czech Republic) Jan Hernych (Ukraine) Danylo Kalenichenko
October 10	Czech Republic F7 Futures; Jablonec nad Nisou, Czech Republic; Carpet (indoor) $10,000; Singles and doubles draws	(Poland) Adam Majchrowicz (Czech Republic) Petr Michnev; 6–2, 7–6^{(7–2)}	(Czech Republic) Tomáš Papík (Czech Republic) David Poljak	(Czech Republic) Dominik Kellovský (Austria) David Pichler	(Croatia) Filip Veger (Czech Republic) Tomáš Papík (Czech Republic) Jan Hernych (Ukraine) Danylo Kalenichenko
October 10	Ecuador F1 Futures; Quito, Ecuador; Clay $10,000; Singles and doubles draws	(Ecuador) Iván Endara; 4–6, 6–1, 7–6^{(7–1)}	(Peru) Juan Pablo Varillas	(Argentina) Franco Agamenone (Brazil) Thales Turini	(Mexico) Luis Patiño (Argentina) Matías Franco Descotte (Bolivia) Federico Zeballos (United States) Raleigh Smith
October 10	Ecuador F1 Futures; Quito, Ecuador; Clay $10,000; Singles and doubles draws	(Brazil) Rafael Matos (Brazil) João Menezes; 6–1, 6–4	(Argentina) Matías Franco Descotte (United States) Raleigh Smith	(Argentina) Franco Agamenone (Brazil) Thales Turini	(Mexico) Luis Patiño (Argentina) Matías Franco Descotte (Bolivia) Federico Zeballos (United States) Raleigh Smith
October 10	Egypt F28 Futures; Sharm El Sheikh, Egypt; Hard $10,000; Singles and doubles draws	(South Africa) Lloyd Harris; 6–3, 6–2	(Spain) Pablo Vivero González	(Italy) Antonio Massara (Italy) Giorgio Ricca	(Poland) Kacper Żuk (Slovakia) Ivan Kosec (Slovakia) Adrian Sikora (Poland) Szymon Walków
October 10	Egypt F28 Futures; Sharm El Sheikh, Egypt; Hard $10,000; Singles and doubles draws	(Poland) Kamil Gajewski (Poland) Szymon Walków; 7–6^{(8–6)}, 6–3	(Italy) Antonio Massara (Italy) Andrea Vavassori	(Italy) Antonio Massara (Italy) Giorgio Ricca	(Poland) Kacper Żuk (Slovakia) Ivan Kosec (Slovakia) Adrian Sikora (Poland) Szymon Walków
October 10	France F22 Futures; Saint-Dizier, France; Hard (indoor) $10,000; Singles and doubles draws	(France) Rémi Boutillier; 6–4, 6–1	(France) Evan Furness	(France) Grégoire Barrère (France) Jonathan Kanar	(France) Geoffrey Blancaneaux (Belgium) Julien Dubail (France) Antoine Hoang (France) Hugo Nys
October 10	France F22 Futures; Saint-Dizier, France; Hard (indoor) $10,000; Singles and doubles draws	(France) Mick Lescure (France) Hugo Nys; 6–2, 6–3	(France) Geoffrey Blancaneaux (France) Evan Furness	(France) Grégoire Barrère (France) Jonathan Kanar	(France) Geoffrey Blancaneaux (Belgium) Julien Dubail (France) Antoine Hoang (France) Hugo Nys
October 10	Germany F14 Futures; Oberhaching, Germany; Hard (indoor) $10,000; Singles and doubles draws	(Germany) Mats Moraing; 6–4, 6–2	(Germany) Robin Kern	(Germany) Louis Wessels (Czech Republic) Marek Jaloviec	(Germany) Marvin Möller (France) Antoine Escoffier (Slovenia) Tom Kočevar-Dešman (Germany) Cedrik-Marcel Stebe
October 10	Germany F14 Futures; Oberhaching, Germany; Hard (indoor) $10,000; Singles and doubles draws	(Germany) Hannes Wagner (Germany) Louis Wessels; 6–1, 6–4	(Switzerland) Raphael Baltensperger (Switzerland) Marc-Andrea Hüsler	(Germany) Louis Wessels (Czech Republic) Marek Jaloviec	(Germany) Marvin Möller (France) Antoine Escoffier (Slovenia) Tom Kočevar-Dešman (Germany) Cedrik-Marcel Stebe
October 10	Italy F33 Futures; Pula, Italy; Clay $10,000; Singles and doubles draws	(Italy) Stefano Travaglia; 6–4, 2–6, 6–1	(Germany) Daniel Altmaier	(Italy) Matteo Berrettini (Germany) Marvin Netuschil	(Italy) Andres Gabriel Ciurletti (Romania) Petru-Alexandru Luncanu (Hungary) Attila Balázs (France) Alexis Musialek
October 10	Italy F33 Futures; Pula, Italy; Clay $10,000; Singles and doubles draws	(Romania) Patrick Grigoriu (Romania) Petru-Alexandru Luncanu; 6–2, 2–6, [11–9]	(Italy) Omar Giacalone (Italy) Jacopo Stefanini	(Italy) Matteo Berrettini (Germany) Marvin Netuschil	(Italy) Andres Gabriel Ciurletti (Romania) Petru-Alexandru Luncanu (Hungary) Attila Balázs (France) Alexis Musialek
October 10	Spain F33 Futures; Madrid, Spain; Hard $10,000; Singles and doubles draws	(Spain) Carlos Gómez-Herrera; 6–4, 6–3	(Spain) Andrés Artuñedo	(Spain) Jaume Pla Malfeito (Spain) Gerard Granollers	(Spain) Ricardo Ojeda Lara (Italy) Raúl Brancaccio (Spain) Carlos Boluda-Purkiss (Spain) Miguel Semmler
October 10	Spain F33 Futures; Madrid, Spain; Hard $10,000; Singles and doubles draws	(Spain) Carlos Gómez-Herrera (Spain) Gerard Granollers; 6–1, 5–3, ret.	(Spain) Carlos Boluda-Purkiss (Spain) Miguel Semmler	(Spain) Jaume Pla Malfeito (Spain) Gerard Granollers	(Spain) Ricardo Ojeda Lara (Italy) Raúl Brancaccio (Spain) Carlos Boluda-Purkiss (Spain) Miguel Semmler
October 10	Tunisia F27 Futures; Hammamet, Tunisia; Clay $10,000; Singles and doubles draws	(France) Benjamin Bonzi; 7–5, 6–3	(Spain) Javier Martí	(France) Maxime Mora (Lithuania) Laurynas Grigelis	(Italy) Davide Galoppini (Belgium) Omar Salman (Qatar) Mubarak Shannan Zayid (Spain) Oriol Roca Batalla
October 10	Tunisia F27 Futures; Hammamet, Tunisia; Clay $10,000; Singles and doubles draws	(Lithuania) Laurynas Grigelis (Spain) Oriol Roca Batalla; 6–1, 6–1	(Italy) Tommaso Gabrieli (Italy) Luca Tomasetto	(France) Maxime Mora (Lithuania) Laurynas Grigelis	(Italy) Davide Galoppini (Belgium) Omar Salman (Qatar) Mubarak Shannan Zayid (Spain) Oriol Roca Batalla
October 10	Turkey F41 Futures; Antalya, Turkey; Hard $10,000; Singles and doubles draws	(Slovakia) Alex Molčan; 6–4, 7–5	(Serbia) Nikola Milojević	(United Kingdom) Daniel Cox (Italy) Francesco Vilardo	(Turkey) Altuğ Çelikbilek (Romania) Andrei Ștefan Apostol (Ukraine) Vadym Ursu (Romania) Nicolae Frunză
October 10	Turkey F41 Futures; Antalya, Turkey; Hard $10,000; Singles and doubles draws	(France) Florent Diep (Italy) Francesco Vilardo; 6–1, 7–5	(Romania) Andrei Ștefan Apostol (Romania) Nicolae Frunză	(United Kingdom) Daniel Cox (Italy) Francesco Vilardo	(Turkey) Altuğ Çelikbilek (Romania) Andrei Ștefan Apostol (Ukraine) Vadym Ursu (Romania) Nicolae Frunză
October 17	France F23 Futures; Rodez, France; Hard (indoor) $25,000+H; Singles and doubles draws	(Belgium) Maxime Authom; 6–3, 6–3	(Italy) Edoardo Eremin	(Belgium) Julien Dubail (France) Yannick Jankovits	(France) Dorian Descloix (France) Benjamin Bonzi (Germany) Mats Moraing (Australia) Alex de Minaur
October 17	France F23 Futures; Rodez, France; Hard (indoor) $25,000+H; Singles and doubles draws	(Belgium) Maxime Authom (Belgium) Romain Barbosa; 6–4, 6–4	(France) Yannick Jankovits (France) Yannick Thivant	(Belgium) Julien Dubail (France) Yannick Jankovits	(France) Dorian Descloix (France) Benjamin Bonzi (Germany) Mats Moraing (Australia) Alex de Minaur
October 17	Nigeria F6 Futures; Lagos, Nigeria; Hard $25,000+H; Singles and doubles draws	(Spain) Enrique López Pérez; 7–5, 7–5	(France) Calvin Hemery	(Tunisia) Moez Echargui (France) Gianni Mina	(Poland) Maciej Smoła (India) Sasikumar Mukund (Egypt) Karim-Mohamed Maamoun (Netherlands) Boy Westerhof
October 17	Nigeria F6 Futures; Lagos, Nigeria; Hard $25,000+H; Singles and doubles draws	(Spain) Alejandro Davidovich Fokina (Benin) Alexis Klégou; 6–4, 6–1	(Poland) Karol Drzewiecki (Poland) Maciej Smoła	(Tunisia) Moez Echargui (France) Gianni Mina	(Poland) Maciej Smoła (India) Sasikumar Mukund (Egypt) Karim-Mohamed Maamoun (Netherlands) Boy Westerhof
October 17	USA F32 Futures; Harlingen, United States; Hard $25,000; Singles and doubles draws	(Germany) Dominik Köpfer; 6–4, 6–4	(United Kingdom) Luke Bambridge	(Zimbabwe) Benjamin Lock (Spain) Guanarteme Nuez Delgado	(United States) A.J. Catanzariti (United States) Wil Spencer (United States) Jared Hiltzik (Romania) Dragoș Constantin Ignat
October 17	USA F32 Futures; Harlingen, United States; Hard $25,000; Singles and doubles draws	(United Kingdom) Luke Bambridge (United States) Evan King; 6–4, 6–4	(United States) John McNally (United States) Evan Zhu	(Zimbabwe) Benjamin Lock (Spain) Guanarteme Nuez Delgado	(United States) A.J. Catanzariti (United States) Wil Spencer (United States) Jared Hiltzik (Romania) Dragoș Constantin Ignat
October 17	USA F33 Futures; Berkeley, United States; Hard $25,000; Singles and doubles draws	(United States) Marcos Giron; 5–7, 7–6^{(7–5)}, 6–4	(Sweden) André Göransson	(Belgium) Ruben Bemelmans (Mexico) Lucas Gómez	(France) Florian Lakat (United States) Rhyne Williams (Belgium) Michael Geerts (United States) John Lamble
October 17	USA F33 Futures; Berkeley, United States; Hard $25,000; Singles and doubles draws	(United States) Connor Smith (United States) Rhyne Williams; 6–4, 6–3	(Sweden) André Göransson (Netherlands) Sem Verbeek	(Belgium) Ruben Bemelmans (Mexico) Lucas Gómez	(France) Florian Lakat (United States) Rhyne Williams (Belgium) Michael Geerts (United States) John Lamble
October 17	Chinese Taipei F2 Futures; Kaohsiung, Chinese Taipei; Hard $10,000; Singles and doubles draws	(Japan) Takuto Niki; 4–6, 7–5, 6–3	(Japan) Jumpei Yamasaki	(Japan) Makoto Ochi (Chinese Taipei) Lee Kuan-yi	(Finland) Patrik Niklas-Salminen (Japan) Yuichi Ito (South Korea) Chung Yun-seong (Japan) Ryota Tanuma
October 17	Chinese Taipei F2 Futures; Kaohsiung, Chinese Taipei; Hard $10,000; Singles and doubles draws	(South Korea) Chung Yun-seong (Finland) Patrik Niklas-Salminen; 7–5, 6–4	(Chinese Taipei) Chiu Yu-hsiang (Chinese Taipei) Liu Shao-fan	(Japan) Makoto Ochi (Chinese Taipei) Lee Kuan-yi	(Finland) Patrik Niklas-Salminen (Japan) Yuichi Ito (South Korea) Chung Yun-seong (Japan) Ryota Tanuma
October 17	Colombia F6 Futures; Neiva, Colombia; Clay $10,000; Singles and doubles draws	(Colombia) Alejandro Gómez; 7–5, 6–4	(Colombia) Daniel Elahi Galán	(Brazil) Nicolas Santos (Brazil) Ricardo Hocevar	(Colombia) Felipe Mantilla (Colombia) Juan Sebastián Gómez (Chile) Michel Vernier (Brazil) Caio Silva
October 17	Colombia F6 Futures; Neiva, Colombia; Clay $10,000; Singles and doubles draws	(Brazil) Nicolas Santos (Brazil) Caio Silva; 6–3, 6–4	(Colombia) Juan Sebastián Gómez (Colombia) Juan Montes	(Brazil) Nicolas Santos (Brazil) Ricardo Hocevar	(Colombia) Felipe Mantilla (Colombia) Juan Sebastián Gómez (Chile) Michel Vernier (Brazil) Caio Silva
October 17	Croatia F11 Futures; Bol, Croatia; Clay $10,000; Singles and doubles draws	(Czech Republic) Jaroslav Pospíšil; 6–3, 0–0, ret.	(Italy) Riccardo Bellotti	(Bosnia and Herzegovina) Tomislav Brkić (Slovenia) Tomislav Ternar	(Montenegro) Ljubomir Čelebić (Serbia) Ivan Bjelica (Croatia) Nino Serdarušić (Germany) Paul Wörner
October 17	Croatia F11 Futures; Bol, Croatia; Clay $10,000; Singles and doubles draws	(United Kingdom) James Marsalek (Poland) Grzegorz Panfil; 2–6, 7–6^{(7–2)}, [10–8]	(Netherlands) Jesse Huta Galung (Netherlands) Paul Monteban	(Bosnia and Herzegovina) Tomislav Brkić (Slovenia) Tomislav Ternar	(Montenegro) Ljubomir Čelebić (Serbia) Ivan Bjelica (Croatia) Nino Serdarušić (Germany) Paul Wörner
October 17	Czech Republic F8 Futures; Jablonec nad Nisou, Czech Republic; Carpet (indoor) $10,000; Singles and doubles draws	(Czech Republic) Petr Michnev; 7–6^{(8–6)}, 7–5	(Netherlands) Niels Lootsma	(Czech Republic) Marek Gengel (Czech Republic) Tomáš Papík	(Czech Republic) Jan Minář (Czech Republic) Ondřej Krstev (Slovakia) Lukáš Klein (Croatia) Filip Veger
October 17	Czech Republic F8 Futures; Jablonec nad Nisou, Czech Republic; Carpet (indoor) $10,000; Singles and doubles draws	(Slovakia) Lukáš Klein (Slovakia) Patrik Néma; 6–1, 6–3	(Czech Republic) Pavel Motl (Czech Republic) Matěj Vocel	(Czech Republic) Marek Gengel (Czech Republic) Tomáš Papík	(Czech Republic) Jan Minář (Czech Republic) Ondřej Krstev (Slovakia) Lukáš Klein (Croatia) Filip Veger
October 17	Ecuador F2 Futures; Quito, Ecuador; Clay $10,000; Singles and doubles draws	(Brazil) João Menezes; 6–3, 3–6, 7–5	(Bolivia) Federico Zeballos	(Brazil) Thales Turini (Peru) Juan Pablo Varillas	(Argentina) Franco Agamenone (Mexico) Luis Patiño (Argentina) Matías Zukas (Peru) Mauricio Echazú
October 17	Ecuador F2 Futures; Quito, Ecuador; Clay $10,000; Singles and doubles draws	(Bolivia) Alejandro Mendoza (Peru) Jorge Panta; Walkover	(Peru) Mauricio Echazú (Bolivia) Federico Zeballos	(Brazil) Thales Turini (Peru) Juan Pablo Varillas	(Argentina) Franco Agamenone (Mexico) Luis Patiño (Argentina) Matías Zukas (Peru) Mauricio Echazú
October 17	Egypt F29 Futures; Sharm El Sheikh, Egypt; Hard $10,000; Singles and doubles draws	(South Africa) Lloyd Harris; 7–6^{(11–9)}, 4–6, 6–4	(Spain) Pablo Vivero González	(United States) Conor Berg (Spain) José Francisco Vidal Azorín	(Austria) Dominic Weidinger (Spain) David Jordà Sanchis (India) Aryan Goveas (United Kingdom) Robbie Ridout
October 17	Egypt F29 Futures; Sharm El Sheikh, Egypt; Hard $10,000; Singles and doubles draws	(South Africa) Lloyd Harris (Egypt) Issam Haitham Taweel; 6–1, 6–3	(United States) Conor Berg (United States) Mitchell Thomas McDaniels	(United States) Conor Berg (Spain) José Francisco Vidal Azorín	(Austria) Dominic Weidinger (Spain) David Jordà Sanchis (India) Aryan Goveas (United Kingdom) Robbie Ridout
October 17	Germany F15 Futures; Ismaning, Germany; Carpet (indoor) $10,000; Singles and doubles draws	(Czech Republic) Marek Jaloviec; 7–5, 7–6^{(7–2)}	(Germany) Tobias Simon	(Germany) Dominik Böhler (Germany) Rudolf Molleker	(Switzerland) Raphael Baltensperger (Netherlands) Gijs Brouwer (Monaco) Lucas Catarina (Austria) Jurij Rodionov
October 17	Germany F15 Futures; Ismaning, Germany; Carpet (indoor) $10,000; Singles and doubles draws	(Slovakia) Patrik Fabian (Germany) Denis Kapric; 4–6, 6–4, [12–10]	(Austria) David Pichler (Russia) Yan Sabanin	(Germany) Dominik Böhler (Germany) Rudolf Molleker	(Switzerland) Raphael Baltensperger (Netherlands) Gijs Brouwer (Monaco) Lucas Catarina (Austria) Jurij Rodionov
October 17	Italy F34 Futures; Pula, Italy; Clay $10,000; Singles and doubles draws	(Germany) Marvin Netuschil; 6–4, 6–4	(France) Maxime Chazal	(Italy) Matteo Berrettini (Italy) Stefano Travaglia	(France) Samuel Bensoussan (Italy) Gianluca Di Nicola (Germany) Daniel Altmaier (Italy) Omar Giacalone
October 17	Italy F34 Futures; Pula, Italy; Clay $10,000; Singles and doubles draws	(Germany) Daniel Altmaier (Germany) Marvin Netuschil; 6–2, 6–0	(Italy) Claudio Fortuna (Italy) Omar Giacalone	(Italy) Matteo Berrettini (Italy) Stefano Travaglia	(France) Samuel Bensoussan (Italy) Gianluca Di Nicola (Germany) Daniel Altmaier (Italy) Omar Giacalone
October 17	Norway F1 Futures; Oslo, Norway; Hard (indoor) $10,000; Singles and doubles draws	(Italy) Lorenzo Frigerio; 4–6, 6–3, 6–3	(Austria) Lucas Miedler	(Norway) Viktor Durasovic (Germany) Sami Reinwein	(Norway) Simen Sunde Bratholm (United States) Quinton Vega (Switzerland) Marc-Andrea Hüsler (United States) Hunter Callahan
October 17	Norway F1 Futures; Oslo, Norway; Hard (indoor) $10,000; Singles and doubles draws	(Norway) Viktor Durasovic (Austria) Lucas Miedler; 6–1, 6–1	(Sweden) David Norfeldt (Sweden) Robin Thour	(Norway) Viktor Durasovic (Germany) Sami Reinwein	(Norway) Simen Sunde Bratholm (United States) Quinton Vega (Switzerland) Marc-Andrea Hüsler (United States) Hunter Callahan
October 17	Spain F34 Futures; Melilla, Spain; Clay $10,000; Singles and doubles draws	(Spain) Mario Vilella Martínez; 6–3, 6–3	(Spain) Ricardo Ojeda Lara	(Spain) Jaume Pla Malfeito (Spain) Albert Alcaraz Ivorra	(Spain) Carlos Boluda-Purkiss (Spain) Alejandro Ibáñez Gallego (Russia) Boris Pokotilov (Spain) Marcos Giraldi Requena
October 17	Spain F34 Futures; Melilla, Spain; Clay $10,000; Singles and doubles draws	(Spain) Carlos Boluda-Purkiss (Spain) David Vega Hernández; 6–7^{(9–11)}, 7–6^{(7–5)}, [10–6]	(Spain) Albert Alcaraz Ivorra (Spain) Mario Vilella Martínez	(Spain) Jaume Pla Malfeito (Spain) Albert Alcaraz Ivorra	(Spain) Carlos Boluda-Purkiss (Spain) Alejandro Ibáñez Gallego (Russia) Boris Pokotilov (Spain) Marcos Giraldi Requena
October 17	Tunisia F28 Futures; Hammamet, Tunisia; Clay $10,000; Singles and doubles draws	(Lithuania) Laurynas Grigelis; 6–0, 6–1	(Portugal) Fred Gil	(Portugal) João Monteiro (Spain) Oriol Roca Batalla	(France) Maxime Mora (Spain) Carlos Taberner (Argentina) Santiago Villarruel (Russia) Alexander Zhurbin
October 17	Tunisia F28 Futures; Hammamet, Tunisia; Clay $10,000; Singles and doubles draws	(Spain) Sergio Martos Gornés (Spain) Oriol Roca Batalla; 6–4, 6–4	(Portugal) Felipe Cunha e Silva (Portugal) Fred Gil	(Portugal) João Monteiro (Spain) Oriol Roca Batalla	(France) Maxime Mora (Spain) Carlos Taberner (Argentina) Santiago Villarruel (Russia) Alexander Zhurbin
October 17	Turkey F42 Futures; Antalya, Turkey; Hard $10,000; Singles and doubles draws	(Ukraine) Artem Smirnov; 5–7, 6–4, 6–2	(Netherlands) Tallon Griekspoor	(Turkey) Altuğ Çelikbilek (Ukraine) Vadym Ursu	(Turkey) Anıl Yüksel (Italy) Riccardo Bonadio (Bulgaria) Alexandar Lazov (Netherlands) Vincent van den Honert
October 17	Turkey F42 Futures; Antalya, Turkey; Hard $10,000; Singles and doubles draws	(Ukraine) Vadym Ursu (Ukraine) Volodymyr Uzhylovskyi; 3–6, 6–2, [10–5]	(Italy) Riccardo Bonadio (Italy) Francesco Vilardo	(Turkey) Altuğ Çelikbilek (Ukraine) Vadym Ursu	(Turkey) Anıl Yüksel (Italy) Riccardo Bonadio (Bulgaria) Alexandar Lazov (Netherlands) Vincent van den Honert
October 17	Vietnam F7 Futures; Thủ Dầu Một, Vietnam; Hard $10,000; Singles and doubles draws	(Japan) Masato Shiga; 6–3, 6–1	(South Korea) Noh Sang-woo	(Canada) Kelsey Stevenson (United Kingdom) Rhett Purcell	(United States) David Nguyen (Australia) Stefan Skadarka (Vietnam) Lý Hoàng Nam (France) Laurent Rochette
October 17	Vietnam F7 Futures; Thủ Dầu Một, Vietnam; Hard $10,000; Singles and doubles draws	(China) Chang Yu (China) Wang Aoran; 5–7, 6–3, [10–5]	(Philippines) Francis Casey Alcantara (Indonesia) David Agung Susanto	(Canada) Kelsey Stevenson (United Kingdom) Rhett Purcell	(United States) David Nguyen (Australia) Stefan Skadarka (Vietnam) Lý Hoàng Nam (France) Laurent Rochette
October 24	USA F34 Futures; Burlingame, United States; Hard (indoor) $25,000; Singles and doubles draws	(Belgium) Ruben Bemelmans; 6–1, 6–2	(Republic of Ireland) Sam Barry	(United States) Raymond Sarmiento (United States) Mico Santiago	(Germany) Sebastian Fanselow (Denmark) Benjamin Hannestad (Sweden) André Göransson (New Zealand) José Statham
October 24	USA F34 Futures; Burlingame, United States; Hard (indoor) $25,000; Singles and doubles draws	(Philippines) Ruben Gonzales (South Africa) Ruan Roelofse; 6–4, 6–4	(Republic of Ireland) Sam Barry (United States) Peter Kobelt	(United States) Raymond Sarmiento (United States) Mico Santiago	(Germany) Sebastian Fanselow (Denmark) Benjamin Hannestad (Sweden) André Göransson (New Zealand) José Statham
October 24	Argentina F11 Futures; San Juan, Argentina; Clay $10,000; Singles and doubles draws	(Argentina) Federico Coria; 4–6, 7–6^{(7–1)}, 7–6^{(7–0)}	(Sweden) Christian Lindell	(Argentina) Tomás Lipovšek Puches (Argentina) Franco Emanuel Egea	(Argentina) Gonzalo Villanueva (Argentina) Juan Ignacio Ameal (Brazil) Carlos Eduardo Severino (Argentina) Camilo Ugo Carabelli
October 24	Argentina F11 Futures; San Juan, Argentina; Clay $10,000; Singles and doubles draws	(Chile) Guillermo Rivera Aránguiz (Chile) Ricardo Urzúa-Rivera; 7–6^{(9–7)}, 6–1	(Argentina) Juan Pablo Ficovich (Argentina) Camilo Ugo Carabelli	(Argentina) Tomás Lipovšek Puches (Argentina) Franco Emanuel Egea	(Argentina) Gonzalo Villanueva (Argentina) Juan Ignacio Ameal (Brazil) Carlos Eduardo Severino (Argentina) Camilo Ugo Carabelli
October 24	Chinese Taipei F3 Futures; Kaohsiung, Chinese Taipei; Hard $10,000; Singles and doubles draws	(Chinese Taipei) Yu Cheng-yu; 6–1, 2–6, 6–3	(Belgium) Jonas Merckx	(Chinese Taipei) Hsu Yu-hsiou (Finland) Patrik Niklas-Salminen	(Thailand) Wishaya Trongcharoenchaikul (Finland) Max Wennakoski (Chinese Taipei) Wu Tung-lin (Chinese Taipei) Lo Chien-hsun
October 24	Chinese Taipei F3 Futures; Kaohsiung, Chinese Taipei; Hard $10,000; Singles and doubles draws	(Chinese Taipei) Hung Jui-chen (Chinese Taipei) Lin Wei-de; 6–7^{(4–7)}, 6–1, [11–9]	(Chinese Taipei) Chiu Yu-hsiang (Chinese Taipei) Liu Shao-fan	(Chinese Taipei) Hsu Yu-hsiou (Finland) Patrik Niklas-Salminen	(Thailand) Wishaya Trongcharoenchaikul (Finland) Max Wennakoski (Chinese Taipei) Wu Tung-lin (Chinese Taipei) Lo Chien-hsun
October 24	Czech Republic F9 Futures; Opava, Czech Republic; Carpet (indoor) $10,000; Singles and doubles draws	(Czech Republic) Jan Mertl; 6–4, 6–3	(Czech Republic) Petr Michnev	(Czech Republic) Tomáš Papík (Czech Republic) Marek Jaloviec	(Slovakia) Lukáš Klein (Slovakia) Patrik Néma (Czech Republic) Matěj Vocel (Czech Republic) Vít Kopřiva
October 24	Czech Republic F9 Futures; Opava, Czech Republic; Carpet (indoor) $10,000; Singles and doubles draws	(Poland) Piotr Matuszewski (Poland) Grzegorz Panfil; 6–1, 6–3	(Slovakia) Lukáš Klein (Slovakia) Patrik Néma	(Czech Republic) Tomáš Papík (Czech Republic) Marek Jaloviec	(Slovakia) Lukáš Klein (Slovakia) Patrik Néma (Czech Republic) Matěj Vocel (Czech Republic) Vít Kopřiva
October 24	Ecuador F3 Futures; Salinas, Ecuador; Clay $10,000; Singles and doubles draws	(Argentina) Franco Agamenone; 6–2, 6–7^{(3–7)}, 6–0	(Ecuador) Roberto Quiroz	(Argentina) Matías Zukas (Brazil) Nicolas Santos	(United States) Raleigh Smith (Brazil) Ricardo Hocevar (United States) Tyler Mercier (Argentina) Facundo Juárez
October 24	Ecuador F3 Futures; Salinas, Ecuador; Clay $10,000; Singles and doubles draws	(Argentina) Franco Agamenone (Bolivia) Federico Zeballos; 7–6^{(7–3)}, 6–4	(Chile) Jorge Montero (Argentina) Matías Zukas	(Argentina) Matías Zukas (Brazil) Nicolas Santos	(United States) Raleigh Smith (Brazil) Ricardo Hocevar (United States) Tyler Mercier (Argentina) Facundo Juárez
October 24	Egypt F30 Futures; Sharm El Sheikh, Egypt; Hard $10,000; Singles and doubles draws	(Russia) Roman Safiullin; 6–2, 7–6^{(7–5)}	(Spain) Pablo Vivero González	(Ukraine) Vladyslav Manafov (France) Benjamin Bonzi	(Spain) Iouri Sant Syromolotov Netrebin (Ukraine) Dmytro Kamynin (Kazakhstan) Denis Yevseyev (Egypt) Issam Haitham Taweel
October 24	Egypt F30 Futures; Sharm El Sheikh, Egypt; Hard $10,000; Singles and doubles draws	(Egypt) Karim-Mohamed Maamoun (Ukraine) Vladyslav Manafov; 6–4, 6–2	(France) Benjamin Bonzi (United Kingdom) Jonathan Gray	(Ukraine) Vladyslav Manafov (France) Benjamin Bonzi	(Spain) Iouri Sant Syromolotov Netrebin (Ukraine) Dmytro Kamynin (Kazakhstan) Denis Yevseyev (Egypt) Issam Haitham Taweel
October 24	Estonia F2 Futures; Tartu, Estonia; Carpet (indoor) $10,000; Singles and doubles draws	(Estonia) Kenneth Raisma; 6–4, 6–3	(Estonia) Vladimir Ivanov	(Belarus) Dzmitry Zhyrmont (Russia) Alexander Igoshin	(Slovakia) Patrik Fabian (Italy) Andrea Basso (United Kingdom) Mark Whitehouse (Latvia) Krišjānis Stabiņš
October 24	Estonia F2 Futures; Tartu, Estonia; Carpet (indoor) $10,000; Singles and doubles draws	(Russia) Aleksandr Vasilenko (Belarus) Dzmitry Zhyrmont; 7–5, 6–2	(Estonia) Vladimir Ivanov (Estonia) Kenneth Raisma	(Belarus) Dzmitry Zhyrmont (Russia) Alexander Igoshin	(Slovakia) Patrik Fabian (Italy) Andrea Basso (United Kingdom) Mark Whitehouse (Latvia) Krišjānis Stabiņš
October 24	Germany F16 Futures; Bad Salzdetfurth, Germany; Carpet (indoor) $10,000; Singles and doubles draws	(Belgium) Christopher Heyman; 3–6, 6–4, 6–2	(Poland) Andriej Kapaś	(Netherlands) Gijs Brouwer (Germany) Louis Wessels	(Netherlands) Jelle Sels (Germany) Oscar Otte (France) Hugo Voljacques (Germany) Mauro Piras
October 24	Germany F16 Futures; Bad Salzdetfurth, Germany; Carpet (indoor) $10,000; Singles and doubles draws	(Germany) Andreas Mies (Germany) Oscar Otte; 6–7^{(3–7)}, 6–4, [10–7]	(Germany) Marvin Möller (Germany) Tim Rühl	(Netherlands) Gijs Brouwer (Germany) Louis Wessels	(Netherlands) Jelle Sels (Germany) Oscar Otte (France) Hugo Voljacques (Germany) Mauro Piras
October 24	Great Britain F4 Futures; Loughborough, Great Britain; Hard (indoor) $10,000; Singles and doubles draws	(Belgium) Maxime Authom; 3–1, ret.	(Germany) Yannick Maden	(United Kingdom) Jonny O'Mara (Switzerland) Yann Marti	(Germany) Tobias Simon (United Kingdom) Ewan Moore (United Kingdom) Scott Clayton (United States) Nicholas Hu
October 24	Great Britain F4 Futures; Loughborough, Great Britain; Hard (indoor) $10,000; Singles and doubles draws	(United Kingdom) Scott Clayton (United Kingdom) Jonny O'Mara; 6–3, 6–2	(United Kingdom) Billy Harris (Poland) Mateusz Terczyński	(United Kingdom) Jonny O'Mara (Switzerland) Yann Marti	(Germany) Tobias Simon (United Kingdom) Ewan Moore (United Kingdom) Scott Clayton (United States) Nicholas Hu
October 24	Greece F7 Futures; Heraklion, Greece; Hard $10,000; Singles and doubles draws	(Belgium) Germain Gigounon; 6–4, 6–4	(Czech Republic) Dominik Kellovský	(Germany) Jakob Sude (Ukraine) Filipp Kekercheni	(France) Florent Diep (Switzerland) Adrian Bodmer (France) Corentin Denolly (France) Yannick Jankovits
October 24	Greece F7 Futures; Heraklion, Greece; Hard $10,000; Singles and doubles draws	(Poland) Adrian Andrzejczuk (Poland) Mateusz Smolicki; 6–7^{(1–7)}, 7–6^{(7–5)}, [11–9]	(Russia) Markos Kalovelonis (Ukraine) Filipp Kekercheni	(Germany) Jakob Sude (Ukraine) Filipp Kekercheni	(France) Florent Diep (Switzerland) Adrian Bodmer (France) Corentin Denolly (France) Yannick Jankovits
October 24	Italy F35 Futures; Pula, Italy; Clay $10,000; Singles and doubles draws	(Germany) Marvin Netuschil; 7–6^{(8–6)}, 6–4	(Italy) Walter Trusendi	(Italy) Matteo Viola (France) Maxime Chazal	(Italy) Matteo Berrettini (Germany) Florian Fallert (Italy) Stefano Travaglia (Italy) Omar Giacalone
October 24	Italy F35 Futures; Pula, Italy; Clay $10,000; Singles and doubles draws	(Italy) Andres Gabriel Ciurletti (Italy) Corrado Summaria; 6–3, 6–4	(Italy) Pietro Licciardi (Italy) Francesco Moncagatto	(Italy) Matteo Viola (France) Maxime Chazal	(Italy) Matteo Berrettini (Germany) Florian Fallert (Italy) Stefano Travaglia (Italy) Omar Giacalone
October 24	Norway F2 Futures; Oslo, Norway; Hard (indoor) $10,000; Singles and doubles draws	(Austria) Lucas Miedler; 6–2, 6–4	(Italy) Gianluigi Quinzi	(France) Hugo Grenier (Sweden) Patrik Rosenholm	(Norway) Viktor Durasovic (France) Corentin Moutet (Italy) Lorenzo Frigerio (Switzerland) Marc-Andrea Hüsler
October 24	Norway F2 Futures; Oslo, Norway; Hard (indoor) $10,000; Singles and doubles draws	(France) Hugo Grenier (Croatia) Fran Zvonimir Zgombić; 7–5, 3–6, [10–8]	(Sweden) Daniel Appelgren (Sweden) Patrik Rosenholm	(France) Hugo Grenier (Sweden) Patrik Rosenholm	(Norway) Viktor Durasovic (France) Corentin Moutet (Italy) Lorenzo Frigerio (Switzerland) Marc-Andrea Hüsler
October 24	Spain F35 Futures; La Vall d'Uixó, Spain; Clay $10,000; Singles and doubles draws	(Russia) Ivan Gakhov; 6–2, 6–2	(Spain) Carlos Taberner	(Spain) Ricardo Ojeda Lara (Spain) Mario Vilella Martínez	(Spain) Álvaro López San Martín (Spain) Jaume Pla Malfeito (Spain) Javier Barranco Cosano (Spain) Carlos Boluda-Purkiss
October 24	Spain F35 Futures; La Vall d'Uixó, Spain; Clay $10,000; Singles and doubles draws	(Russia) Ivan Gakhov (Spain) Carlos Taberner; 7–6^{(7–2)}, 3–6, [10–7]	(Spain) Javier Barranco Cosano (Italy) Raúl Brancaccio	(Spain) Ricardo Ojeda Lara (Spain) Mario Vilella Martínez	(Spain) Álvaro López San Martín (Spain) Jaume Pla Malfeito (Spain) Javier Barranco Cosano (Spain) Carlos Boluda-Purkiss
October 24	Tunisia F29 Futures; Hammamet, Tunisia; Clay $10,000; Singles and doubles draws	(Germany) Jeremy Jahn; 6–2, 7–6^{(10–8)}	(Portugal) João Domingues	(Portugal) Fred Gil (Netherlands) Alban Meuffels	(Netherlands) Lennert van der Linden (Romania) Dragoș Dima (Austria) Peter Goldsteiner (France) Alexis Musialek
October 24	Tunisia F29 Futures; Hammamet, Tunisia; Clay $10,000; Singles and doubles draws	(Portugal) Felipe Cunha e Silva (Portugal) Fred Gil; 6–2, 7–5	(Netherlands) Alban Meuffels (Netherlands) Lennert van der Linden	(Portugal) Fred Gil (Netherlands) Alban Meuffels	(Netherlands) Lennert van der Linden (Romania) Dragoș Dima (Austria) Peter Goldsteiner (France) Alexis Musialek
October 24	Turkey F43 Futures; Antalya, Turkey; Hard $10,000; Singles and doubles draws	(Netherlands) Tallon Griekspoor; 6–4, 6–4	(Bulgaria) Dimitar Kuzmanov	(Belgium) Julien Dubail (Italy) Riccardo Bonadio	(Turkey) Altuğ Çelikbilek (Turkey) Muhammet Haylaz (Belgium) Yannick Vandenbulcke (Turkey) Anıl Yüksel
October 24	Turkey F43 Futures; Antalya, Turkey; Hard $10,000; Singles and doubles draws	(Ukraine) Vadym Ursu (Ukraine) Volodymyr Uzhylovskyi; 6–0, 6–1	(Bulgaria) Dimitar Kuzmanov (Bulgaria) Alexandar Lazov	(Belgium) Julien Dubail (Italy) Riccardo Bonadio	(Turkey) Altuğ Çelikbilek (Turkey) Muhammet Haylaz (Belgium) Yannick Vandenbulcke (Turkey) Anıl Yüksel
October 24	Vietnam F8 Futures; Thủ Dầu Một, Vietnam; Hard $10,000; Singles and doubles draws	(France) Enzo Couacaud; 6–2, 6–1	(India) Rishab Agarwal	(Japan) Ken Onishi (South Korea) Kim Young-seok	(Indonesia) David Agung Susanto (United States) Evan Song (India) Niki Kaliyanda Poonacha (France) Laurent Rochette
October 24	Vietnam F8 Futures; Thủ Dầu Một, Vietnam; Hard $10,000; Singles and doubles draws	(South Korea) Kim Young-seok (South Korea) Noh Sang-woo; 0–6, 6–4, [10–8]	(Philippines) Francis Casey Alcantara (Indonesia) David Agung Susanto	(Japan) Ken Onishi (South Korea) Kim Young-seok	(Indonesia) David Agung Susanto (United States) Evan Song (India) Niki Kaliyanda Poonacha (France) Laurent Rochette
October 31	Argentina F12 Futures; Buenos Aires, Argentina; Clay $10,000+H; Singles and doubles draws	(Argentina) Federico Coria; 6–4, 6–2	(Argentina) Matías Zukas	(Brazil) Carlos Eduardo Severino (Argentina) Juan Pablo Ficovich	(Japan) Ryusei Makiguchi (Japan) Kaichi Uchida (Argentina) Mateo Nicolás Martínez (Argentina) Franco Emanuel Egea
October 31	Argentina F12 Futures; Buenos Aires, Argentina; Clay $10,000+H; Singles and doubles draws	(Argentina) Juan Ignacio Galarza (Argentina) Mariano Kestelboim; 6–3, 6–4	(Chile) Víctor Núñez (Chile) Ricardo Urzúa-Rivera	(Brazil) Carlos Eduardo Severino (Argentina) Juan Pablo Ficovich	(Japan) Ryusei Makiguchi (Japan) Kaichi Uchida (Argentina) Mateo Nicolás Martínez (Argentina) Franco Emanuel Egea
October 31	Egypt F31 Futures; Sharm El Sheikh, Egypt; Hard $10,000; Singles and doubles draws	(France) Benjamin Bonzi; 4–6, 6–3, 6–1	(Austria) Dennis Novak	(Russia) Roman Safiullin (Czech Republic) Michal Schmid	(Ukraine) Vladyslav Manafov (Ukraine) Oleksandr Bielinskyi (Switzerland) Siméon Rossier (Egypt) Karim-Mohamed Maamoun
October 31	Egypt F31 Futures; Sharm El Sheikh, Egypt; Hard $10,000; Singles and doubles draws	(Egypt) Karim-Mohamed Maamoun (Ukraine) Vladyslav Manafov; 6–2, 6–3	(Ukraine) Yurii Dzhavakian (Kazakhstan) Denis Yevseyev	(Russia) Roman Safiullin (Czech Republic) Michal Schmid	(Ukraine) Vladyslav Manafov (Ukraine) Oleksandr Bielinskyi (Switzerland) Siméon Rossier (Egypt) Karim-Mohamed Maamoun
October 31	Estonia F3 Futures; Tallinn, Estonia; Hard (indoor) $10,000; Singles and doubles draws	(Netherlands) Niels Lootsma; 6–2, 6–4	(Ukraine) Marat Deviatiarov	(Russia) Aleksandr Vasilenko (Netherlands) Botic van de Zandschulp	(Belarus) Dzmitry Zhyrmont (Estonia) Vladimir Ivanov (Slovakia) Patrik Fabian (Ukraine) Denys Mylokostov
October 31	Estonia F3 Futures; Tallinn, Estonia; Hard (indoor) $10,000; Singles and doubles draws	(Netherlands) Niels Lootsma (Netherlands) Botic van de Zandschulp; 6–3, 5–7, [10–6]	(Slovakia) Karol Beck (Russia) Artem Dubrivnyy	(Russia) Aleksandr Vasilenko (Netherlands) Botic van de Zandschulp	(Belarus) Dzmitry Zhyrmont (Estonia) Vladimir Ivanov (Slovakia) Patrik Fabian (Ukraine) Denys Mylokostov
October 31	Germany F17 Futures; Leimen, Germany; Hard (indoor) $10,000; Singles and doubles draws	(Switzerland) Yann Marti; 6–4, 6–2	(Belgium) Yannik Reuter	(Czech Republic) Marek Jaloviec (Poland) Hubert Hurkacz	(Germany) Robin Kern (Germany) Benjamin Hassan (Monaco) Lucas Catarina (France) Ugo Humbert
October 31	Germany F17 Futures; Leimen, Germany; Hard (indoor) $10,000; Singles and doubles draws	(Poland) Aleksander Charpantidis (Poland) Hubert Hurkacz; 6–1, 6–3	(Germany) Marvin Möller (Germany) Tim Rühl	(Czech Republic) Marek Jaloviec (Poland) Hubert Hurkacz	(Germany) Robin Kern (Germany) Benjamin Hassan (Monaco) Lucas Catarina (France) Ugo Humbert
October 31	Great Britain F5 Futures; Sheffield, Great Britain; Hard (indoor) $10,000; Singles and doubles draws	(Belgium) Maxime Authom; 7–5, 6–1	(Denmark) Frederik Nielsen	(United Kingdom) Richard Gabb (United Kingdom) Jonny O'Mara	(United Kingdom) Marshall Tutu (France) Pierre Faivre (Israel) Ben Patael (Lithuania) Laurynas Grigelis
October 31	Great Britain F5 Futures; Sheffield, Great Britain; Hard (indoor) $10,000; Singles and doubles draws	(United Kingdom) Scott Clayton (United Kingdom) Jonny O'Mara; 6–4, 6–4	(United Kingdom) Alastair Gray (United Kingdom) Ewan Moore	(United Kingdom) Richard Gabb (United Kingdom) Jonny O'Mara	(United Kingdom) Marshall Tutu (France) Pierre Faivre (Israel) Ben Patael (Lithuania) Laurynas Grigelis
October 31	Greece F8 Futures; Heraklion, Greece; Hard $10,000; Singles and doubles draws	(Czech Republic) Václav Šafránek; 7–5, 6–4	(France) Alexandre Müller	(Bosnia and Herzegovina) Tomislav Brkić (Netherlands) Jesse Huta Galung	(Serbia) Petar Čonkić (Greece) Ioannis Stergiou (Croatia) Mate Delić (Belgium) Germain Gigounon
October 31	Greece F8 Futures; Heraklion, Greece; Hard $10,000; Singles and doubles draws	(Switzerland) Adrian Bodmer (Germany) Jakob Sude; 6–2, 6–1	(France) Florent Diep (France) Alexandre Müller	(Bosnia and Herzegovina) Tomislav Brkić (Netherlands) Jesse Huta Galung	(Serbia) Petar Čonkić (Greece) Ioannis Stergiou (Croatia) Mate Delić (Belgium) Germain Gigounon
October 31	Italy F36 Futures; Pula, Italy; Clay $10,000; Singles and doubles draws	(Italy) Stefano Travaglia; 4–6, 6–2, 6–3	(Italy) Salvatore Caruso	(Italy) Andrea Basso (Italy) Omar Giacalone	(Italy) Giovanni Rizzuti (Italy) Riccardo Balzerani (Italy) Andrea Grazioso (Italy) Corrado Summaria
October 31	Italy F36 Futures; Pula, Italy; Clay $10,000; Singles and doubles draws	(Italy) Andrea Basso (Italy) Francesco Moncagatto; 4–6, 6–4, [10–6]	(Italy) Filippo Baldi (Italy) Jacopo Stefanini	(Italy) Andrea Basso (Italy) Omar Giacalone	(Italy) Giovanni Rizzuti (Italy) Riccardo Balzerani (Italy) Andrea Grazioso (Italy) Corrado Summaria
October 31	Kuwait F1 Futures; Mishref, Kuwait; Hard $10,000; Singles and doubles draws	(Austria) Maximilian Neuchrist; 6–3, 6–4	(Uzbekistan) Sanjar Fayziev	(Germany) Daniel Altmaier (Spain) Nicola Kuhn	(Turkmenistan) Isa Mammetgulyyev (Japan) Hiroyasu Ehara (France) Ronan Joncour (Sweden) Fred Simonsson
October 31	Kuwait F1 Futures; Mishref, Kuwait; Hard $10,000; Singles and doubles draws	(Germany) Daniel Altmaier (Sweden) Fred Simonsson; 7–6^{(7–3)}, 6–2	(Uzbekistan) Sanjar Fayziev (Uzbekistan) Shonigmatjon Shofayziyev	(Germany) Daniel Altmaier (Spain) Nicola Kuhn	(Turkmenistan) Isa Mammetgulyyev (Japan) Hiroyasu Ehara (France) Ronan Joncour (Sweden) Fred Simonsson
October 31	Morocco F7 Futures; Casablanca, Morocco; Clay $10,000; Singles and doubles draws	(Italy) Riccardo Bellotti; 6–4, 4–6, 6–4	(Croatia) Kristijan Mesaroš	(Argentina) Dante Gennaro (Spain) Marcos Giraldi Requena	(Netherlands) Colin van Beem (Morocco) Amine Ahouda (Italy) Davide Galoppini (France) Johan Tatlot
October 31	Morocco F7 Futures; Casablanca, Morocco; Clay $10,000; Singles and doubles draws	(Germany) Julian Onken (Germany) Leon Schütt; 4–6, 6–2, [10–7]	(Netherlands) Marc Dijkhuizen (Netherlands) Colin van Beem	(Argentina) Dante Gennaro (Spain) Marcos Giraldi Requena	(Netherlands) Colin van Beem (Morocco) Amine Ahouda (Italy) Davide Galoppini (France) Johan Tatlot
October 31	Norway F3 Futures; Oslo, Norway; Hard (indoor) $10,000; Singles and doubles draws	(Italy) Gianluigi Quinzi; 6–4, 6–2	(Norway) Casper Ruud	(Austria) Lucas Miedler (Sweden) Dragoș Nicolae Mădăraș	(Sweden) Patrik Rosenholm (Germany) Florian Fallert (Germany) Sami Reinwein (Germany) Tobias Simon
October 31	Norway F3 Futures; Oslo, Norway; Hard (indoor) $10,000; Singles and doubles draws	(Canada) Martin Beran (Slovakia) Filip Horanský; 6–3, 2–6, [10–4]	(Austria) Lucas Miedler (Italy) Gianluigi Quinzi	(Austria) Lucas Miedler (Sweden) Dragoș Nicolae Mădăraș	(Sweden) Patrik Rosenholm (Germany) Florian Fallert (Germany) Sami Reinwein (Germany) Tobias Simon
October 31	South Africa F1 Futures; Stellenbosch, South Africa; Hard $10,000; Singles and doubles draws	(South Africa) Lloyd Harris; 6–4, 6–4	(Italy) Alessandro Bega	(Germany) Christoph Negritu (United Kingdom) Jay Clarke	(France) Thomas Setodji (Australia) Calum Puttergill (South Africa) Nicolaas Scholtz (Hungary) Gábor Borsos
October 31	South Africa F1 Futures; Stellenbosch, South Africa; Hard $10,000; Singles and doubles draws	(Italy) Alessandro Bega (Switzerland) Luca Margaroli; 7–5, 6–2	(South Africa) Chris Haggard (South Africa) Nicolaas Scholtz	(Germany) Christoph Negritu (United Kingdom) Jay Clarke	(France) Thomas Setodji (Australia) Calum Puttergill (South Africa) Nicolaas Scholtz (Hungary) Gábor Borsos
October 31	Tunisia F30 Futures; Hammamet, Tunisia; Clay $10,000; Singles and doubles draws	(Belgium) Julien Cagnina; 3–6, 6–3, 7–5	(Portugal) João Domingues	(Serbia) Miljan Zekić (Germany) Jeremy Jahn	(France) Alexis Musialek (Portugal) Gonçalo Oliveira (Lithuania) Lukas Mugevičius (Portugal) Fred Gil
October 31	Tunisia F30 Futures; Hammamet, Tunisia; Clay $10,000; Singles and doubles draws	(Portugal) Felipe Cunha e Silva (Portugal) Fred Gil; 7–6^{(7–2)}, 7–6^{(7–5)}	(Lithuania) Lukas Mugevičius (Portugal) Gonçalo Oliveira	(Serbia) Miljan Zekić (Germany) Jeremy Jahn	(France) Alexis Musialek (Portugal) Gonçalo Oliveira (Lithuania) Lukas Mugevičius (Portugal) Fred Gil
October 31	Turkey F44 Futures; Antalya, Turkey; Hard $10,000; Singles and doubles draws	(Germany) Marc Sieber; 6–1, 7–5	(Czech Republic) Michal Konečný	(Kazakhstan) Dmitry Popko (Turkey) Altuğ Çelikbilek	(Bulgaria) Alexandar Lazov (Ukraine) Vadim Alekseenko (Bulgaria) Dimitar Kuzmanov (Turkey) Sarp Ağabigün
October 31	Turkey F44 Futures; Antalya, Turkey; Hard $10,000; Singles and doubles draws	(Russia) Bogdan Bobrov (Kazakhstan) Dmitry Popko; 6–7^{(4–7)}, 6–0, [10–7]	(Russia) Maxim Ratniuk (Ukraine) Volodymyr Uzhylovskyi	(Kazakhstan) Dmitry Popko (Turkey) Altuğ Çelikbilek	(Bulgaria) Alexandar Lazov (Ukraine) Vadim Alekseenko (Bulgaria) Dimitar Kuzmanov (Turkey) Sarp Ağabigün
October 31	USA F35 Futures; Birmingham, United States; Clay $10,000; Singles and doubles draws	(Canada) Félix Auger-Aliassime; 7–5, 7–5	(Colombia) Juan Manuel Benítez Chavarriaga	(Germany) Lukas Ollert (France) Samuel Bensoussan	(Canada) Benjamin Sigouin (United States) Austin Smith (United States) Nick Chappell (United States) Wil Spencer
October 31	USA F35 Futures; Birmingham, United States; Clay $10,000; Singles and doubles draws	(United States) Hunter Johnson (United States) Yates Johnson; 6–2, 6–4	(United States) Alex Lawson (United States) Austin Smith	(Germany) Lukas Ollert (France) Samuel Bensoussan	(Canada) Benjamin Sigouin (United States) Austin Smith (United States) Nick Chappell (United States) Wil Spencer
October 31	Vietnam F9 Futures; Thủ Dầu Một, Vietnam; Hard $10,000; Singles and doubles draws	(France) Enzo Couacaud; 6–1, 6–1	(Philippines) Francis Casey Alcantara	(Chinese Taipei) Chen Ti (United States) Evan Song	(Chinese Taipei) Hung Jui-chen (Vietnam) Lý Hoàng Nam (India) Sasikumar Mukund (Indonesia) David Agung Susanto
October 31	Vietnam F9 Futures; Thủ Dầu Một, Vietnam; Hard $10,000; Singles and doubles draws	(Chinese Taipei) Chen Ti (Vietnam) Lý Hoàng Nam; 6–2, 4–6, [10–5]	(South Korea) Moon Ju-hae (South Korea) Noh Sang-woo	(Chinese Taipei) Chen Ti (United States) Evan Song	(Chinese Taipei) Hung Jui-chen (Vietnam) Lý Hoàng Nam (India) Sasikumar Mukund (Indonesia) David Agung Susanto

=== November ===
Week of	Tournament	Winner	Runners-up	Semifinalists	Quarterfinalists
November 7	Australia F9 Futures; Wollongong, Australia; Hard $25,000; Singles and doubles draws	(Australia) Maverick Banes; 6–7^{(6–8)}, 7–5, 6–2	(United States) Jarmere Jenkins	(Australia) Harry Bourchier (India) Sriram Balaji	(Australia) Blake Mott (United States) Nathan Pasha (Australia) Gavin van Peperzeel (India) Sumit Nagal
November 7	Australia F9 Futures; Wollongong, Australia; Hard $25,000; Singles and doubles draws	(Australia) Daniel Nolan (New Zealand) Finn Tearney; 6–4, 4–6, [10–5]	(Australia) Maverick Banes (Australia) Gavin van Peperzeel	(Australia) Harry Bourchier (India) Sriram Balaji	(Australia) Blake Mott (United States) Nathan Pasha (Australia) Gavin van Peperzeel (India) Sumit Nagal
November 7	Argentina F13 Futures; Villa del Dique, Argentina; Clay $10,000; Singles and doubles draws	(Argentina) Federico Coria; 3–6, 6–1, 6–4	(Argentina) Tomás Lipovšek Puches	(Japan) Kaichi Uchida (Argentina) Juan Ignacio Galarza	(Argentina) Gonzalo Villanueva (Argentina) Manuel Peña López (Argentina) Mariano Kestelboim (Argentina) Juan Pablo Ficovich
November 7	Argentina F13 Futures; Villa del Dique, Argentina; Clay $10,000; Singles and doubles draws	(Argentina) Federico Coria (Argentina) Tomás Lipovšek Puches; 7–6^{(10–8)}, 6–0	(Chile) Cristóbal Saavedra (Chile) Ricardo Urzúa-Rivera	(Japan) Kaichi Uchida (Argentina) Juan Ignacio Galarza	(Argentina) Gonzalo Villanueva (Argentina) Manuel Peña López (Argentina) Mariano Kestelboim (Argentina) Juan Pablo Ficovich
November 7	Bolivia F1 Futures; La Paz, Bolivia; Clay $10,000; Singles and doubles draws	(Bolivia) Federico Zeballos; 5–7, 7–5, 6–4	(Argentina) Matías Zukas	(Japan) Ryusei Makiguchi (Peru) Mauricio Echazú	(Bolivia) Alejandro Mendoza (Peru) Jorge Panta (Bolivia) Stephan Koenigsfest (United States) Andrew Korinek
November 7	Bolivia F1 Futures; La Paz, Bolivia; Clay $10,000; Singles and doubles draws	(Peru) Mauricio Echazú (Peru) Jorge Panta; 6–2, 7–6^{(7–3)}	(Bolivia) Hugo Dellien (Bolivia) Federico Zeballos	(Japan) Ryusei Makiguchi (Peru) Mauricio Echazú	(Bolivia) Alejandro Mendoza (Peru) Jorge Panta (Bolivia) Stephan Koenigsfest (United States) Andrew Korinek
November 7	Costa Rica F1 Futures; San José, Costa Rica; Hard $10,000; Singles and doubles draws	(Dominican Republic) José Olivares; 6–4, 6–4	(United States) Evan Song	(United States) Danny Thomas (Portugal) Bernardo Saraiva	(United States) Connor Smith (United States) Raleigh Smith (United States) Robert Livi (Argentina) Matías Franco Descotte
November 7	Costa Rica F1 Futures; San José, Costa Rica; Hard $10,000; Singles and doubles draws	(United Kingdom) Farris Fathi Gosea (United States) Cameron Silverman; 3–6, 6–4, [10–4]	(United States) Raleigh Smith (Peru) Juan Pablo Varillas	(United States) Danny Thomas (Portugal) Bernardo Saraiva	(United States) Connor Smith (United States) Raleigh Smith (United States) Robert Livi (Argentina) Matías Franco Descotte
November 7	Egypt F32 Futures; Sharm El Sheikh, Egypt; Hard $10,000; Singles and doubles draws	(Czech Republic) Michal Schmid; 6–3, 0–6, 7–6^{(7–5)}	(Russia) Roman Safiullin	(Ukraine) Vladyslav Manafov (Egypt) Karim-Mohamed Maamoun	(Austria) Dennis Novak (Italy) Antonio Massara (Italy) Giorgio Ricca (Switzerland) Siméon Rossier
November 7	Egypt F32 Futures; Sharm El Sheikh, Egypt; Hard $10,000; Singles and doubles draws	(Ukraine) Vladyslav Manafov (Ukraine) Daniil Zarichanskyy; 6–4, 7–6^{(8–6)}	(India) Shahbaaz Khan (Georgia (country)) George Tsivadze	(Ukraine) Vladyslav Manafov (Egypt) Karim-Mohamed Maamoun	(Austria) Dennis Novak (Italy) Antonio Massara (Italy) Giorgio Ricca (Switzerland) Siméon Rossier
November 7	Estonia F4 Futures; Pärnu, Estonia; Hard (indoor) $10,000; Singles and doubles draws	(Netherlands) Botic van de Zandschulp; 6–2, 6–4	(Estonia) Vladimir Ivanov	(Estonia) Kenneth Raisma (Netherlands) Niels Lootsma	(Russia) Vitaly Kozyukov (Ukraine) Denys Mylokostov (United States) Shane Vinsant (Russia) Evgenii Tiurnev
November 7	Estonia F4 Futures; Pärnu, Estonia; Hard (indoor) $10,000; Singles and doubles draws	(Ukraine) Marat Deviatiarov (Russia) Aleksandr Vasilenko; Walkover	(Estonia) Vladimir Ivanov (Estonia) Kenneth Raisma	(Estonia) Kenneth Raisma (Netherlands) Niels Lootsma	(Russia) Vitaly Kozyukov (Ukraine) Denys Mylokostov (United States) Shane Vinsant (Russia) Evgenii Tiurnev
November 7	Great Britain F6 Futures; Barnstaple, Great Britain; Hard (indoor) $10,000; Singles and doubles draws	(United Kingdom) Neil Pauffley; 6–4, 6–4	(Denmark) Frederik Nielsen	(Netherlands) Tallon Griekspoor (United Kingdom) Alastair Gray	(United Kingdom) Ewan Moore (United Kingdom) Joel Cannell (United Kingdom) Jonny O'Mara (United States) Hunter Callahan
November 7	Great Britain F6 Futures; Barnstaple, Great Britain; Hard (indoor) $10,000; Singles and doubles draws	(United Kingdom) Scott Clayton (United Kingdom) Jonny O'Mara; 6–4, 7–5	(United States) Hunter Callahan (United States) Nicholas Hu	(Netherlands) Tallon Griekspoor (United Kingdom) Alastair Gray	(United Kingdom) Ewan Moore (United Kingdom) Joel Cannell (United Kingdom) Jonny O'Mara (United States) Hunter Callahan
November 7	Greece F9 Futures; Heraklion, Greece; Hard $10,000; Singles and doubles draws	(Spain) Carlos Gómez-Herrera; 6–2, 6–2	(Israel) Daniel Cukierman	(Czech Republic) Václav Šafránek (Germany) Christian Hirschmüller	(Japan) Sora Fukuda (Russia) Markos Kalovelonis (Netherlands) Jesse Huta Galung (Japan) Jumpei Yamasaki
November 7	Greece F9 Futures; Heraklion, Greece; Hard $10,000; Singles and doubles draws	(Slovenia) Rok Jarc (Slovenia) Aljaž Jakob Kaplja; 4–6, 6–3, [10–6]	(Czech Republic) Dominik Kellovský (Czech Republic) Václav Šafránek	(Czech Republic) Václav Šafránek (Germany) Christian Hirschmüller	(Japan) Sora Fukuda (Russia) Markos Kalovelonis (Netherlands) Jesse Huta Galung (Japan) Jumpei Yamasaki
November 7	Italy F37 Futures; Latina, Italy; Clay $10,000; Singles and doubles draws	(Italy) Matteo Viola; 0–6, 7–5, 6–2	(Hungary) Attila Balázs	(Italy) Filippo Baldi (Italy) Andrea Basso	(Italy) Jacopo Stefanini (Italy) Riccardo Roberto (Italy) Gianluca Di Nicola (Italy) Nicola Ghedin
November 7	Italy F37 Futures; Latina, Italy; Clay $10,000; Singles and doubles draws	(Italy) Filippo Baldi (Italy) Giuseppe Fischetti; 6–1, 6–7^{(2–7)}, [10–5]	(Italy) Francesco Moncagatto (Italy) Jacopo Stefanini	(Italy) Filippo Baldi (Italy) Andrea Basso	(Italy) Jacopo Stefanini (Italy) Riccardo Roberto (Italy) Gianluca Di Nicola (Italy) Nicola Ghedin
November 7	Kuwait F2 Futures; Mishref, Kuwait; Hard $10,000; Singles and doubles draws	(Uzbekistan) Sanjar Fayziev; 6–2, 7–6^{(8–6)}	(Russia) Evgeny Karlovskiy	(Spain) David Pérez Sanz (Austria) Maximilian Neuchrist	(Japan) Hiroyasu Ehara (France) Ronan Joncour (Germany) Daniel Altmaier (Netherlands) Robert Willekes MacDonald
November 7	Kuwait F2 Futures; Mishref, Kuwait; Hard $10,000; Singles and doubles draws	(Venezuela) Jordi Muñoz Abreu (Spain) David Pérez Sanz; 6–4, 6–4	(Germany) Daniel Altmaier (Sweden) Fred Simonsson	(Spain) David Pérez Sanz (Austria) Maximilian Neuchrist	(Japan) Hiroyasu Ehara (France) Ronan Joncour (Germany) Daniel Altmaier (Netherlands) Robert Willekes MacDonald
November 7	Morocco F8 Futures; Casablanca, Morocco; Clay $10,000; Singles and doubles draws	(Morocco) Lamine Ouahab; 6–4, 6–3	(Spain) Álvaro López San Martín	(Italy) Riccardo Bellotti (Spain) Pedro Martínez	(Spain) Sergio Barranco (Netherlands) Lennert van der Linden (Russia) Ivan Gakhov (Spain) Carlos Boluda-Purkiss
November 7	Morocco F8 Futures; Casablanca, Morocco; Clay $10,000; Singles and doubles draws	(Netherlands) Colin van Beem (Netherlands) Lennert van der Linden; 4–6, 7–6^{(7–0)}, [10–4]	(United States) Matthew Kandath (Poland) Bartosz Wojnar	(Italy) Riccardo Bellotti (Spain) Pedro Martínez	(Spain) Sergio Barranco (Netherlands) Lennert van der Linden (Russia) Ivan Gakhov (Spain) Carlos Boluda-Purkiss
November 7	South Africa F2 Futures; Stellenbosch, South Africa; Hard $10,000; Singles and doubles draws	(South Africa) Lloyd Harris; 6–0, 6–1	(Spain) Jordi Samper Montaña	(United Kingdom) Jay Clarke (Italy) Alessandro Bega	(Israel) Dekel Bar (United Kingdom) James Marsalek (Germany) Christoph Negritu (Austria) Philipp Schroll
November 7	South Africa F2 Futures; Stellenbosch, South Africa; Hard $10,000; Singles and doubles draws	(Hungary) Gábor Borsos (Switzerland) Luca Margaroli; 6–2, 6–3	(United Kingdom) James Marsalek (Spain) Jordi Samper Montaña	(United Kingdom) Jay Clarke (Italy) Alessandro Bega	(Israel) Dekel Bar (United Kingdom) James Marsalek (Germany) Christoph Negritu (Austria) Philipp Schroll
November 7	Spain F36 Futures; Cuevas del Almanzora, Spain; Hard $10,000; Singles and doubles draws	(Spain) Roberto Ortega Olmedo; 6–0, 7–6^{(7–4)}	(Spain) Jaume Munar	(Spain) Mario Vilella Martínez (Spain) Ricardo Ojeda Lara	(Germany) Hannes Wagner (Spain) Pablo Vivero González (Portugal) João Monteiro (Spain) Alejandro Davidovich Fokina
November 7	Spain F36 Futures; Cuevas del Almanzora, Spain; Hard $10,000; Singles and doubles draws	(Spain) Javier Barranco Cosano (Italy) Raúl Brancaccio; 6–3, 6–0	(Spain) Roberto Ortega Olmedo (Spain) David Vega Hernández	(Spain) Mario Vilella Martínez (Spain) Ricardo Ojeda Lara	(Germany) Hannes Wagner (Spain) Pablo Vivero González (Portugal) João Monteiro (Spain) Alejandro Davidovich Fokina
November 7	Tunisia F31 Futures; Hammamet, Tunisia; Clay $10,000; Singles and doubles draws	(Portugal) João Domingues; 6–3, 6–1	(Spain) Pol Toledo Bagué	(Portugal) Fred Gil (Lithuania) Lukas Mugevičius	(Brazil) Igor Marcondes (Spain) Adria Mas Mascolo (Portugal) Gonçalo Oliveira (Spain) Sergio Martos Gornés
November 7	Tunisia F31 Futures; Hammamet, Tunisia; Clay $10,000; Singles and doubles draws	(Spain) Sergio Martos Gornés (Spain) Pol Toledo Bagué; 6–4, 6–0	(Italy) Luca Giacomini (Italy) Edoardo Sardella	(Portugal) Fred Gil (Lithuania) Lukas Mugevičius	(Brazil) Igor Marcondes (Spain) Adria Mas Mascolo (Portugal) Gonçalo Oliveira (Spain) Sergio Martos Gornés
November 7	Turkey F45 Futures; Antalya, Turkey; Hard $10,000; Singles and doubles draws	(Kazakhstan) Dmitry Popko; 6–2, 7–5	(Turkey) Altuğ Çelikbilek	(Austria) David Pichler (Czech Republic) Michal Konečný	(Russia) Mikhail Fufygin (Ukraine) Vadim Alekseenko (Russia) Kirill Dmitriev (United Kingdom) Dan Dowson
November 7	Turkey F45 Futures; Antalya, Turkey; Hard $10,000; Singles and doubles draws	(Russia) Victor Baluda (Russia) Alexander Pavlioutchenkov; 6–3, 7–6^{(7–2)}	(Kazakhstan) Dmitry Popko (Ukraine) Volodymyr Uzhylovskyi	(Austria) David Pichler (Czech Republic) Michal Konečný	(Russia) Mikhail Fufygin (Ukraine) Vadim Alekseenko (Russia) Kirill Dmitriev (United Kingdom) Dan Dowson
November 7	USA F36 Futures; Niceville, United States; Clay $10,000; Singles and doubles draws	(France) Gianni Mina; 4–6, 6–1, 6–0	(Germany) Constantin Schmitz	(New Zealand) José Statham (Dominican Republic) Roberto Cid Subervi	(France) Maxime Chazal (United States) Sam Riffice (United States) Wil Spencer (Germany) Pirmin Hänle
November 7	USA F36 Futures; Niceville, United States; Clay $10,000; Singles and doubles draws	(Canada) Félix Auger-Aliassime (United States) Patrick Kypson; 7–5, 6–1	(United States) Patrick Daciek (United States) Dane Webb	(New Zealand) José Statham (Dominican Republic) Roberto Cid Subervi	(France) Maxime Chazal (United States) Sam Riffice (United States) Wil Spencer (Germany) Pirmin Hänle
November 14	Australia F10 Futures; Blacktown, Australia; Hard $25,000; Singles and doubles draws	(Australia) Christopher O'Connell; 6–2, 6–2	(Australia) Max Purcell	(India) Sumit Nagal (India) Sriram Balaji	(Australia) Darren Polkinghorne (Australia) Gavin van Peperzeel (Australia) Maverick Banes (Australia) Dayne Kelly
November 14	Australia F10 Futures; Blacktown, Australia; Hard $25,000; Singles and doubles draws	(Australia) Steven de Waard (United States) Jarmere Jenkins; 6–4, 6–2	(India) Sriram Balaji (India) Sanam Singh	(India) Sumit Nagal (India) Sriram Balaji	(Australia) Darren Polkinghorne (Australia) Gavin van Peperzeel (Australia) Maverick Banes (Australia) Dayne Kelly
November 14	Finland F4 Futures; Helsinki, Finland; Hard (indoor) $25,000; Singles and doubles draws	(Germany) Jeremy Jahn; 6–2, 4–6, 6–4	(Ukraine) Denys Mylokostov	(Estonia) Vladimir Ivanov (Croatia) Nino Serdarušić	(Netherlands) Kevin Griekspoor (Zimbabwe) Takanyi Garanganga (Russia) Matvey Khomentovskiy (Belarus) Dzmitry Zhyrmont
November 14	Finland F4 Futures; Helsinki, Finland; Hard (indoor) $25,000; Singles and doubles draws	(Germany) Jeremy Jahn (Poland) Adam Majchrowicz; 3–6, 7–6^{(7–4)}, [10–8]	(Germany) Andreas Mies (Netherlands) David Pel	(Estonia) Vladimir Ivanov (Croatia) Nino Serdarušić	(Netherlands) Kevin Griekspoor (Zimbabwe) Takanyi Garanganga (Russia) Matvey Khomentovskiy (Belarus) Dzmitry Zhyrmont
November 14	Bolivia F2 Futures; Cochabamba, Bolivia; Clay $10,000; Singles and doubles draws	(Argentina) Franco Agamenone; 6–2, 6–1	(Argentina) Matías Zukas	(Italy) Fabrizio Ornago (Bolivia) Federico Zeballos	(Chile) Alejandro Tabilo (Bolivia) Hugo Dellien (Peru) Jorge Panta (Argentina) Franco Emanuel Egea
November 14	Bolivia F2 Futures; Cochabamba, Bolivia; Clay $10,000; Singles and doubles draws	(Argentina) Franco Agamenone (Argentina) Matías Zukas; 7–6^{(7–3)}, 6–3	(Peru) Mauricio Echazú (Peru) Jorge Panta	(Italy) Fabrizio Ornago (Bolivia) Federico Zeballos	(Chile) Alejandro Tabilo (Bolivia) Hugo Dellien (Peru) Jorge Panta (Argentina) Franco Emanuel Egea
November 14	Colombia F7 Futures; Pereira, Colombia; Clay $10,000; Singles and doubles draws	(Colombia) Juan Sebastián Gómez; 6–7^{(4–7)}, 6–1, 6–3	(Peru) Juan Pablo Varillas	(Brazil) Nicolas Santos (Brazil) Oscar José Gutierrez	(Brazil) Tiago Lopes (Mexico) Lucas Gómez (Colombia) Alejandro Gómez (Colombia) Carlos Salamanca
November 14	Colombia F7 Futures; Pereira, Colombia; Clay $10,000; Singles and doubles draws	(Colombia) Alejandro Gómez (Colombia) Carlos Salamanca; 6–4, 5–7, [10–7]	(Italy) Davide Pontoglio (Italy) Giorgio Portaluri	(Brazil) Nicolas Santos (Brazil) Oscar José Gutierrez	(Brazil) Tiago Lopes (Mexico) Lucas Gómez (Colombia) Alejandro Gómez (Colombia) Carlos Salamanca
November 14	Cyprus F1 Futures; Nicosia, Cyprus; Hard $10,000; Singles and doubles draws	(Austria) Lucas Miedler; 6–3, 6–3	(Czech Republic) David Poljak	(Belgium) Omar Salman (Czech Republic) Vít Kopřiva	(Austria) Pascal Brunner (United Kingdom) Joel Cannell (Cyprus) Menelaos Efstathiou (Czech Republic) Michal Schmid
November 14	Cyprus F1 Futures; Nicosia, Cyprus; Hard $10,000; Singles and doubles draws	(Norway) Fredrik Ask (Belgium) Omar Salman; 4–6, 7–5, [10–8]	(Austria) Pascal Brunner (Austria) Lucas Miedler	(Belgium) Omar Salman (Czech Republic) Vít Kopřiva	(Austria) Pascal Brunner (United Kingdom) Joel Cannell (Cyprus) Menelaos Efstathiou (Czech Republic) Michal Schmid
November 14	Egypt F33 Futures; Sharm El Sheikh, Egypt; Hard $10,000; Singles and doubles draws	(Ukraine) Vladyslav Manafov; 6–2, 6–2	(Italy) Joy Vigani	(Poland) Kacper Żuk (Belgium) Jonas Merckx	(Poland) Mateusz Terczyński (Poland) Kamil Gajewski (Poland) Grzegorz Panfil (Italy) Giorgio Ricca
November 14	Egypt F33 Futures; Sharm El Sheikh, Egypt; Hard $10,000; Singles and doubles draws	(Ukraine) Vladyslav Orlov (Georgia (country)) George Tsivadze; 7–6^{(7–2)}, 6–3	(Italy) Antonio Massara (Poland) Mateusz Terczyński	(Poland) Kacper Żuk (Belgium) Jonas Merckx	(Poland) Mateusz Terczyński (Poland) Kamil Gajewski (Poland) Grzegorz Panfil (Italy) Giorgio Ricca
November 14	El Salvador F1 Futures; San Salvador, El Salvador; Hard $10,000; Singles and doubles draws	(El Salvador) Marcelo Arévalo; 6–2, 6–3	(Zimbabwe) Benjamin Lock	(United States) Evan Song (Mexico) Luis Patiño	(United States) Cameron Silverman (Argentina) Matías Franco Descotte (United States) Raleigh Smith (Brazil) Eduardo Dischinger
November 14	El Salvador F1 Futures; San Salvador, El Salvador; Hard $10,000; Singles and doubles draws	(Dominican Republic) José Olivares (Brazil) Caio Silva; 7–6^{(8–6)}, 6–3	(Zimbabwe) Benjamin Lock (United States) Evan Song	(United States) Evan Song (Mexico) Luis Patiño	(United States) Cameron Silverman (Argentina) Matías Franco Descotte (United States) Raleigh Smith (Brazil) Eduardo Dischinger
November 14	Greece F10 Futures; Heraklion, Greece; Hard $10,000; Singles and doubles draws	(Czech Republic) Václav Šafránek; 4–6, 6–3, 7–5	(Austria) Sebastian Ofner	(Japan) Jumpei Yamasaki (Bosnia and Herzegovina) Tomislav Brkić	(Israel) Daniel Cukierman (Austria) Lenny Hampel (France) Jules Okala (Spain) Carlos Gómez-Herrera
November 14	Greece F10 Futures; Heraklion, Greece; Hard $10,000; Singles and doubles draws	(Kazakhstan) Timur Khabibulin (Germany) Jakob Sude; 7–6^{(7–5)}, 6–4	(Croatia) Domagoj Bilješko (Croatia) Antun Vidak	(Japan) Jumpei Yamasaki (Bosnia and Herzegovina) Tomislav Brkić	(Israel) Daniel Cukierman (Austria) Lenny Hampel (France) Jules Okala (Spain) Carlos Gómez-Herrera
November 14	Kuwait F3 Futures; Mishref, Kuwait; Hard $10,000; Singles and doubles draws	(United Kingdom) Marcus Willis; 6–3, 7–6^{(10–8)}	(Germany) Daniel Altmaier	(Spain) David Pérez Sanz (India) Aryan Goveas	(France) Ronan Joncour (Kuwait) Abdullah Maqdes (Netherlands) Paul Monteban (Russia) Evgeny Karlovskiy
November 14	Kuwait F3 Futures; Mishref, Kuwait; Hard $10,000; Singles and doubles draws	(Germany) Daniel Altmaier (United Kingdom) Marcus Willis; 6–1, 6–1	(Netherlands) Roy Sarut de Valk (France) Ronan Joncour	(Spain) David Pérez Sanz (India) Aryan Goveas	(France) Ronan Joncour (Kuwait) Abdullah Maqdes (Netherlands) Paul Monteban (Russia) Evgeny Karlovskiy
November 14	Morocco F9 Futures; Rabat, Morocco; Clay $10,000; Singles and doubles draws	(Morocco) Lamine Ouahab; 3–6, 7–5, 6–4	(Spain) Álvaro López San Martín	(Spain) Pedro Martínez (Netherlands) Lennert van der Linden	(Russia) Alexander Zhurbin (Spain) Carlos Boluda-Purkiss (Russia) Ivan Gakhov (Spain) Marcos Giraldi Requena
November 14	Morocco F9 Futures; Rabat, Morocco; Clay $10,000; Singles and doubles draws	(Spain) Paco Climent Gregori (Russia) Ivan Gakhov; 2–6, 6–4, [15–13]	(Spain) Marcos Giraldi Requena (Morocco) Lamine Ouahab	(Spain) Pedro Martínez (Netherlands) Lennert van der Linden	(Russia) Alexander Zhurbin (Spain) Carlos Boluda-Purkiss (Russia) Ivan Gakhov (Spain) Marcos Giraldi Requena
November 14	South Africa F3 Futures; Stellenbosch, South Africa; Hard $10,000; Singles and doubles draws	(South Africa) Lloyd Harris; 7–5, 6–4	(South Africa) Nicolaas Scholtz	(Spain) Jordi Samper Montaña (Italy) Alessandro Bega	(Germany) Christoph Negritu (United Kingdom) Jay Clarke (Switzerland) Luca Margaroli (United Kingdom) James Marsalek
November 14	South Africa F3 Futures; Stellenbosch, South Africa; Hard $10,000; Singles and doubles draws	(Hungary) Gábor Borsos (Switzerland) Luca Margaroli; 7–6^{(8–6)}, 5–7, [10–5]	(Peru) Alexander Merino (Germany) Christoph Negritu	(Spain) Jordi Samper Montaña (Italy) Alessandro Bega	(Germany) Christoph Negritu (United Kingdom) Jay Clarke (Switzerland) Luca Margaroli (United Kingdom) James Marsalek
November 14	Spain F37 Futures; Cuevas del Almanzora, Spain; Hard $10,000; Singles and doubles draws	(Spain) Ricardo Ojeda Lara; 6–4, 6–1	(Portugal) João Monteiro	(France) Mick Lescure (Spain) Pablo Vivero González	(Spain) Marc Fornell (Italy) Raúl Brancaccio (Spain) David Vega Hernández (Spain) Andrés Artuñedo
November 14	Spain F37 Futures; Cuevas del Almanzora, Spain; Hard $10,000; Singles and doubles draws	(Spain) Jaume Pla Malfeito (Spain) Mario Vilella Martínez; 7–6^{(7–4)}, 2–6, [10–5]	(Spain) Roberto Ortega Olmedo (Spain) David Vega Hernández	(France) Mick Lescure (Spain) Pablo Vivero González	(Spain) Marc Fornell (Italy) Raúl Brancaccio (Spain) David Vega Hernández (Spain) Andrés Artuñedo
November 14	Tunisia F32 Futures; Hammamet, Tunisia; Clay $10,000; Singles and doubles draws	(Spain) Marc Giner; 6–3, 6–2	(Portugal) Fred Gil	(Lithuania) Lukas Mugevičius (Russia) Ivan Nedelko	(Italy) Alessandro Petrone (Portugal) Gonçalo Oliveira (Spain) Pol Toledo Bagué (Italy) Alberto Cammarata
November 14	Tunisia F32 Futures; Hammamet, Tunisia; Clay $10,000; Singles and doubles draws	(Spain) Sergio Martos Gornés (Spain) Pol Toledo Bagué; 6–2, 6–2	(France) Jonathan Kanar (Switzerland) Loïc Perret	(Lithuania) Lukas Mugevičius (Russia) Ivan Nedelko	(Italy) Alessandro Petrone (Portugal) Gonçalo Oliveira (Spain) Pol Toledo Bagué (Italy) Alberto Cammarata
November 14	Turkey F46 Futures; Antalya, Turkey; Hard $10,000; Singles and doubles draws	(Kazakhstan) Dmitry Popko; Walkover	(Russia) Victor Baluda	(Spain) José Francisco Vidal Azorín (Italy) Francesco Ferrari	(Serbia) Nikola Milojević (Ukraine) Volodymyr Uzhylovskyi (Germany) Paul Wörner (Hong Kong) Wong Hong Kit
November 14	Turkey F46 Futures; Antalya, Turkey; Hard $10,000; Singles and doubles draws	(Turkey) Tuna Altuna (Austria) David Pichler; 4–6, 7–6^{(7–4)}, [12–10]	(Russia) Victor Baluda (Russia) Alexander Pavlioutchenkov	(Spain) José Francisco Vidal Azorín (Italy) Francesco Ferrari	(Serbia) Nikola Milojević (Ukraine) Volodymyr Uzhylovskyi (Germany) Paul Wörner (Hong Kong) Wong Hong Kit
November 14	USA F37 Futures; Pensacola, United States; Clay $10,000; Singles and doubles draws	(France) Gianni Mina; 4–6, 6–4, 6–0	(Japan) Naoki Nakagawa	(United States) Patrick Kypson (United States) Alex Rybakov	(United States) Winston Lin (United States) Wil Spencer (New Zealand) José Statham (Canada) Félix Auger-Aliassime
November 14	USA F37 Futures; Pensacola, United States; Clay $10,000; Singles and doubles draws	(United States) Dominic Cotrone (United States) Robert Galloway; 7–5, 6–3	(Brazil) Pedro Dumont (France) Alexandre Peyrot	(United States) Patrick Kypson (United States) Alex Rybakov	(United States) Winston Lin (United States) Wil Spencer (New Zealand) José Statham (Canada) Félix Auger-Aliassime
November 21	Bolivia F3 Futures; Santa Cruz, Bolivia; Clay $10,000; Singles and doubles draws	(Argentina) Federico Coria; 6–4, 6–4	(Brazil) Caio Zampieri	(Bolivia) Federico Zeballos (Chile) Cristóbal Saavedra	(Argentina) Franco Emanuel Egea (Argentina) Juan Ignacio Ameal (Argentina) Matías Zukas (Bolivia) Hugo Dellien
November 21	Bolivia F3 Futures; Santa Cruz, Bolivia; Clay $10,000; Singles and doubles draws	(Bolivia) Hugo Dellien (Bolivia) Federico Zeballos; 6–4, 6–4	(Argentina) Franco Emanuel Egea (Chile) Alejandro Tabilo	(Bolivia) Federico Zeballos (Chile) Cristóbal Saavedra	(Argentina) Franco Emanuel Egea (Argentina) Juan Ignacio Ameal (Argentina) Matías Zukas (Bolivia) Hugo Dellien
November 21	Colombia F8 Futures; Medellín, Colombia; Clay $10,000; Singles and doubles draws	(Colombia) Alejandro Gómez; 5–7, 6–2, 7–6^{(7–3)}	(Colombia) Daniel Elahi Galán	(United States) Adam El Mihdawy (Colombia) Felipe Mantilla	(Colombia) Juan Sebastián Gómez (Ecuador) Iván Endara (Chile) Gerónimo Barrios (Brazil) André Miele
November 21	Colombia F8 Futures; Medellín, Colombia; Clay $10,000; Singles and doubles draws	(Brazil) Oscar José Gutierrez (Brazil) Nicolas Santos; 6–4, 6–3	(United States) Adam El Mihdawy (Colombia) Juan Sebastián Gómez	(United States) Adam El Mihdawy (Colombia) Felipe Mantilla	(Colombia) Juan Sebastián Gómez (Ecuador) Iván Endara (Chile) Gerónimo Barrios (Brazil) André Miele
November 21	Cyprus F2 Futures; Limassol, Cyprus; Hard $10,000; Singles and doubles draws	(France) Alexandre Müller; 6–2, 6–2	(Austria) Lucas Miedler	(Russia) Markos Kalovelonis (Czech Republic) Vít Kopřiva	(Denmark) August Holmgren (United Kingdom) Neil Pauffley (Austria) Pascal Brunner (Romania) Vasile Antonescu
November 21	Cyprus F2 Futures; Limassol, Cyprus; Hard $10,000; Singles and doubles draws	(Austria) Pascal Brunner (Austria) Lucas Miedler; 6–4, 6–2	(United Kingdom) Oliver Hudson (United Kingdom) Keelan Oakley	(Russia) Markos Kalovelonis (Czech Republic) Vít Kopřiva	(Denmark) August Holmgren (United Kingdom) Neil Pauffley (Austria) Pascal Brunner (Romania) Vasile Antonescu
November 21	Czech Republic F10 Futures; Milovice, Czech Republic; Hard (indoor) $10,000; Singles and doubles draws	(Czech Republic) Marek Jaloviec; 6–4, 6–1	(Netherlands) Botic van de Zandschulp	(Netherlands) Niels Lootsma (Czech Republic) Petr Michnev	(Germany) Elmar Ejupovic (Finland) Patrick Kaukovalta (Czech Republic) Jan Minář (Germany) Christian Hirschmüller
November 21	Czech Republic F10 Futures; Milovice, Czech Republic; Hard (indoor) $10,000; Singles and doubles draws	(Czech Republic) Tomáš Papík (Czech Republic) Matěj Vocel; 6–3, 1–6, [10–4]	(Netherlands) Niels Lootsma (Netherlands) Botic van de Zandschulp	(Netherlands) Niels Lootsma (Czech Republic) Petr Michnev	(Germany) Elmar Ejupovic (Finland) Patrick Kaukovalta (Czech Republic) Jan Minář (Germany) Christian Hirschmüller
November 21	Egypt F34 Futures; Sharm El Sheikh, Egypt; Hard $10,000; Singles and doubles draws	(Ukraine) Vladyslav Manafov; 7–6^{(7–5)}, 1–1, ret.	(France) Lény Mitjana	(Belgium) Jonas Merckx (Poland) Piotr Matuszewski	(Poland) Grzegorz Panfil (Ukraine) Daniil Zarichanskyy (Italy) Antonio Massara (Chinese Taipei) Yang Tsung-hua
November 21	Egypt F34 Futures; Sharm El Sheikh, Egypt; Hard $10,000; Singles and doubles draws	(Poland) Piotr Matuszewski (Poland) Kacper Żuk; 3–6, 6–2, [10–7]	(Poland) Kamil Gajewski (Poland) Szymon Walków	(Belgium) Jonas Merckx (Poland) Piotr Matuszewski	(Poland) Grzegorz Panfil (Ukraine) Daniil Zarichanskyy (Italy) Antonio Massara (Chinese Taipei) Yang Tsung-hua
November 21	El Salvador F2 Futures; La Libertad, El Salvador; Clay $10,000; Singles and doubles draws	(El Salvador) Marcelo Arévalo; 6–1, 6–2	(Brazil) Bruno Sant'Anna	(Brazil) Fernando Romboli (Guatemala) Wilfredo González	(United States) Evan Song (Brazil) Caio Silva (United States) Farzin Danny Amiri (Brazil) Luís Britto
November 21	El Salvador F2 Futures; La Libertad, El Salvador; Clay $10,000; Singles and doubles draws	(El Salvador) Marcelo Arévalo (Guatemala) Christopher Díaz Figueroa; 6–0, 6–4	(Germany) Pirmin Hänle (United States) Nicholas Reyes	(Brazil) Fernando Romboli (Guatemala) Wilfredo González	(United States) Evan Song (Brazil) Caio Silva (United States) Farzin Danny Amiri (Brazil) Luís Britto
November 21	Greece F11 Futures; Heraklion, Greece; Hard $10,000; Singles and doubles draws	(Austria) Sebastian Ofner; 7–6^{(8–6)}, 6–4	(Czech Republic) Dominik Kellovský	(Czech Republic) Václav Šafránek (Bulgaria) Alexandar Lazarov	(France) Ugo Humbert (Germany) Pascal Mies (Austria) Lenny Hampel (Serbia) Miloš Nikolić
November 21	Greece F11 Futures; Heraklion, Greece; Hard $10,000; Singles and doubles draws	(Austria) Lenny Hampel (Austria) Sebastian Ofner; 7–5, 6–2	(Croatia) Domagoj Bilješko (Croatia) Antun Vidak	(Czech Republic) Václav Šafránek (Bulgaria) Alexandar Lazarov	(France) Ugo Humbert (Germany) Pascal Mies (Austria) Lenny Hampel (Serbia) Miloš Nikolić
November 21	Spain F38 Futures; Cuevas del Almanzora, Spain; Hard $10,000; Singles and doubles draws	(Spain) Ricardo Ojeda Lara; 6–0, 6–2	(Republic of Ireland) Peter Bothwell	(Portugal) João Monteiro (Portugal) Nuno Deus	(Spain) Alberto Romero de Ávila Senise (Spain) Pablo Vivero González (Switzerland) Vullnet Tashi (Spain) Alejandro Davidovich Fokina
November 21	Spain F38 Futures; Cuevas del Almanzora, Spain; Hard $10,000; Singles and doubles draws	(Spain) David Vega Hernández (Spain) Mario Vilella Martínez; 6–4, 7–6^{(7–5)}	(Spain) Jorge Hernando-Ruano (Spain) Pablo Vivero González	(Portugal) João Monteiro (Portugal) Nuno Deus	(Spain) Alberto Romero de Ávila Senise (Spain) Pablo Vivero González (Switzerland) Vullnet Tashi (Spain) Alejandro Davidovich Fokina
November 21	Tunisia F33 Futures; Hammamet, Tunisia; Clay $10,000; Singles and doubles draws	(Spain) Carlos Taberner; 6–4, 7–5	(Portugal) Gonçalo Oliveira	(Russia) Ivan Nedelko (Hungary) Attila Balázs	(Spain) Pedro Martínez (Brazil) Igor Marcondes (Spain) Marc Giner (Italy) Davide Galoppini
November 21	Tunisia F33 Futures; Hammamet, Tunisia; Clay $10,000; Singles and doubles draws	(Hungary) Attila Balázs (Portugal) Gonçalo Oliveira; 6–4, 6–3	(Spain) Sergio Martos Gornés (Spain) Pol Toledo Bagué	(Russia) Ivan Nedelko (Hungary) Attila Balázs	(Spain) Pedro Martínez (Brazil) Igor Marcondes (Spain) Marc Giner (Italy) Davide Galoppini
November 21	Turkey F47 Futures; Antalya, Turkey; Hard $10,000; Singles and doubles draws	(Bulgaria) Alexandar Lazov; 6–0, 6–4	(Italy) Adelchi Virgili	(France) Tak Khunn Wang (Portugal) Frederico Ferreira Silva	(Czech Republic) Michal Konečný (Monaco) Lucas Catarina (Serbia) Petar Čonkić (Bosnia and Herzegovina) Nerman Fatić
November 21	Turkey F47 Futures; Antalya, Turkey; Hard $10,000; Singles and doubles draws	(Turkey) Tuna Altuna (Italy) Adelchi Virgili; 6–4, 6–7^{(5–7)}, [10–6]	(Poland) Adrian Andrzejczuk (Poland) Mateusz Smolicki	(France) Tak Khunn Wang (Portugal) Frederico Ferreira Silva	(Czech Republic) Michal Konečný (Monaco) Lucas Catarina (Serbia) Petar Čonkić (Bosnia and Herzegovina) Nerman Fatić
November 28	USA F39 Futures; Waco, United States; Hard (indoor) $25,000; Singles and doubles draws	(United States) Ryan Shane; 2–6, 7–6^{(9–7)}, 6–4	(United States) Jared Hiltzik	(Germany) Dominik Köpfer (United Kingdom) Luke Bambridge	(United Kingdom) Cameron Norrie (Australia) Aleksandar Vukic (United States) Dennis Nevolo (Netherlands) Tim van Rijthoven
November 28	USA F39 Futures; Waco, United States; Hard (indoor) $25,000; Singles and doubles draws	(United Kingdom) Farris Fathi Gosea (Mexico) Hans Hach Verdugo; 7–5, 6–3	(Colombia) Juan Manuel Benítez Chavarriaga (Germany) Julian Lenz	(Germany) Dominik Köpfer (United Kingdom) Luke Bambridge	(United Kingdom) Cameron Norrie (Australia) Aleksandar Vukic (United States) Dennis Nevolo (Netherlands) Tim van Rijthoven
November 28	Chile F5 Futures; Talca, Chile; Clay $10,000; Singles and doubles draws	(Chile) Nicolás Jarry; 6–1, 7–6^{(7–3)}	(Chile) Bastián Malla	(Chile) Alejandro Tabilo (Brazil) Pedro Sakamoto	(Argentina) Genaro Alberto Olivieri (Chile) Esteban Bruna (Argentina) Manuel Peña López (Chile) Jorge Montero
November 28	Chile F5 Futures; Talca, Chile; Clay $10,000; Singles and doubles draws	(Chile) Marcelo Tomás Barrios Vera (Chile) Jorge Montero; 6–4, 6–3	(Argentina) Gabriel Alejandro Hidalgo (Argentina) Federico Moreno	(Chile) Alejandro Tabilo (Brazil) Pedro Sakamoto	(Argentina) Genaro Alberto Olivieri (Chile) Esteban Bruna (Argentina) Manuel Peña López (Chile) Jorge Montero
November 28	Colombia F9 Futures; Villavicencio, Colombia; Clay $10,000; Singles and doubles draws	(Brazil) Nicolas Santos; 6–4, 6–2	(Colombia) Daniel Elahi Galán	(Ecuador) Iván Endara (Colombia) Juan Sebastián Gómez	(Brazil) Tiago Lopes (Brazil) Oscar José Gutierrez (Mexico) Lucas Gómez (Colombia) Alejandro Gómez
November 28	Colombia F9 Futures; Villavicencio, Colombia; Clay $10,000; Singles and doubles draws	(Italy) Davide Pontoglio (Italy) Giorgio Portaluri; 6–7^{(12–14)}, 6–4, [10–8]	(Brazil) Oscar José Gutierrez (Brazil) Nicolas Santos	(Ecuador) Iván Endara (Colombia) Juan Sebastián Gómez	(Brazil) Tiago Lopes (Brazil) Oscar José Gutierrez (Mexico) Lucas Gómez (Colombia) Alejandro Gómez
November 28	Cyprus F3 Futures; Larnaca, Cyprus; Hard $10,000; Singles and doubles draws	(Austria) Maximilian Neuchrist; 7–6^{(7–3)}, 6–3	(Austria) Lucas Miedler	(Russia) Alexey Vatutin (France) Alexandre Müller	(Czech Republic) Vít Kopřiva (Russia) Alen Avidzba (Spain) Carlos Gómez-Herrera (Russia) Markos Kalovelonis
November 28	Cyprus F3 Futures; Larnaca, Cyprus; Hard $10,000; Singles and doubles draws	(Austria) Lucas Miedler (Austria) Maximilian Neuchrist; 6–3, 1–6, [10–5]	(Russia) Markos Kalovelonis (France) Alexandre Müller	(Russia) Alexey Vatutin (France) Alexandre Müller	(Czech Republic) Vít Kopřiva (Russia) Alen Avidzba (Spain) Carlos Gómez-Herrera (Russia) Markos Kalovelonis
November 28	Czech Republic F11 Futures; Říčany, Czech Republic; Hard (indoor) $10,000; Singles and doubles draws	(Czech Republic) Petr Michnev; 7–6^{(7–2)}, 6–4	(Netherlands) Niels Lootsma	(Ukraine) Danylo Kalenichenko (Netherlands) Botic van de Zandschulp	(Czech Republic) Robin Staněk (Czech Republic) Jan Mertl (Czech Republic) Marek Jaloviec (Croatia) Filip Veger
November 28	Czech Republic F11 Futures; Říčany, Czech Republic; Hard (indoor) $10,000; Singles and doubles draws	(Poland) Mateusz Kowalczyk (Poland) Grzegorz Panfil; 6–4, 6–2	(Ukraine) Danylo Kalenichenko (Ukraine) Filipp Kekercheni	(Ukraine) Danylo Kalenichenko (Netherlands) Botic van de Zandschulp	(Czech Republic) Robin Staněk (Czech Republic) Jan Mertl (Czech Republic) Marek Jaloviec (Croatia) Filip Veger
November 28	Dominican Republic F1 Futures; Santiago de los Caballeros, Dominican Republic; Clay $10,000; Singles and doubles draws	(Brazil) Bruno Sant'Anna; 7–5, 6–3	(United States) Evan King	(France) Gianni Mina (Argentina) Juan Ignacio Galarza	(France) Samuel Bensoussan (Dominican Republic) José Olivares (Russia) Alexander Zhurbin (Brazil) Caio Silva
November 28	Dominican Republic F1 Futures; Santiago de los Caballeros, Dominican Republic; Clay $10,000; Singles and doubles draws	(Brazil) Eduardo Dischinger (Brazil) Bruno Sant'Anna; 6–3, 7–6^{(7–4)}	(United States) Evan King (United States) Hunter Reese	(France) Gianni Mina (Argentina) Juan Ignacio Galarza	(France) Samuel Bensoussan (Dominican Republic) José Olivares (Russia) Alexander Zhurbin (Brazil) Caio Silva
November 28	Egypt F35 Futures; Cairo, Egypt; Clay $10,000; Singles and doubles draws	(United Kingdom) Jay Clarke; 6–7^{(8–10)}, 6–3, 6–1	(Chile) Laslo Urrutia Fuentes	(Austria) Dominic Weidinger (Russia) Alexander Igoshin	(India) Haadin Bava (Czech Republic) Michal Schmid (Egypt) Karim Hossam (Ukraine) Yurii Dzhavakian
November 28	Egypt F35 Futures; Cairo, Egypt; Clay $10,000; Singles and doubles draws	(India) Chandril Sood (India) Lakshit Sood; 6–3, 6–2	(United Kingdom) Curtis Clarke (United Kingdom) Jay Clarke	(Austria) Dominic Weidinger (Russia) Alexander Igoshin	(India) Haadin Bava (Czech Republic) Michal Schmid (Egypt) Karim Hossam (Ukraine) Yurii Dzhavakian
November 28	Indonesia F4 Futures; Jakarta, Indonesia; Hard $10,000; Singles and doubles draws	(Japan) Shintaro Imai; 7–6^{(7–3)}, 6–3	(France) Enzo Couacaud	(India) Sasikumar Mukund (India) Sidharth Rawat	(Chinese Taipei) Meng Cing-yang (China) Zhao Lingxi (Japan) Kento Takeuchi (Belgium) Julien Cagnina
November 28	Indonesia F4 Futures; Jakarta, Indonesia; Hard $10,000; Singles and doubles draws	(South Korea) Chung Yun-seong (Japan) Shintaro Imai; 6–2, 6–4	(Belgium) Julien Cagnina (France) Enzo Couacaud	(India) Sasikumar Mukund (India) Sidharth Rawat	(Chinese Taipei) Meng Cing-yang (China) Zhao Lingxi (Japan) Kento Takeuchi (Belgium) Julien Cagnina
November 28	Israel F16 Futures; Ramat Gan, Israel; Hard $10,000; Singles and doubles draws	(Belgium) Yannick Mertens; 6–3, 6–2	(France) Mick Lescure	(United States) Connor Farren (Germany) Jonas Lütjen	(Israel) Amir Weintraub (Italy) Claudio Fortuna (Israel) Ben Patael (Austria) David Pichler
November 28	Israel F16 Futures; Ramat Gan, Israel; Hard $10,000; Singles and doubles draws	(United States) John Lamble (Netherlands) Sem Verbeek; 6–4, 6–4	(Canada) Martin Beran (Portugal) Bernardo Saraiva	(United States) Connor Farren (Germany) Jonas Lütjen	(Israel) Amir Weintraub (Italy) Claudio Fortuna (Israel) Ben Patael (Austria) David Pichler
November 28	Qatar F4 Futures; Doha, Qatar; Hard $10,000; Singles and doubles draws	(Germany) Daniel Altmaier; 7–5, 6–3	(United Kingdom) Jonny O'Mara	(Italy) Mirko Cutuli (Austria) Sebastian Ofner	(India) Ramkumar Ramanathan (United Kingdom) James Marsalek (France) Tak Khunn Wang (Austria) Lenny Hampel
November 28	Qatar F4 Futures; Doha, Qatar; Hard $10,000; Singles and doubles draws	(United Kingdom) James Marsalek (United Kingdom) Jonny O'Mara; 6–4, 6–4	(Austria) Lenny Hampel (Austria) Sebastian Ofner	(Italy) Mirko Cutuli (Austria) Sebastian Ofner	(India) Ramkumar Ramanathan (United Kingdom) James Marsalek (France) Tak Khunn Wang (Austria) Lenny Hampel
November 28	Spain F39 Futures; Cuevas del Almanzora, Spain; Hard $10,000; Singles and doubles draws	(Japan) Akira Santillan; 6–1, 6–1	(Spain) Roberto Ortega Olmedo	(Spain) Javier Pulgar-García (Spain) Alejandro Davidovich Fokina	(Spain) David Vega Hernández (Spain) Alberto Romero de Ávila Senise (Spain) Bernabé Zapata Miralles (Spain) Pablo Vivero González
November 28	Spain F39 Futures; Cuevas del Almanzora, Spain; Hard $10,000; Singles and doubles draws	(Republic of Ireland) Peter Bothwell (Japan) Akira Santillan; 6–2, 5–7, [10–2]	(Spain) Roberto Ortega Olmedo (Spain) David Vega Hernández	(Spain) Javier Pulgar-García (Spain) Alejandro Davidovich Fokina	(Spain) David Vega Hernández (Spain) Alberto Romero de Ávila Senise (Spain) Bernabé Zapata Miralles (Spain) Pablo Vivero González
November 28	Tunisia F34 Futures; Hammamet, Tunisia; Clay $10,000; Singles and doubles draws	(Hungary) Attila Balázs; 6–3, 7–6^{(7–1)}	(Austria) Gibril Diarra	(France) Jonathan Kanar (Spain) Oriol Roca Batalla	(Italy) Matteo Tinelli (France) Théo Fournerie (Italy) Davide Galoppini (Colombia) Cristian Rodríguez
November 28	Tunisia F34 Futures; Hammamet, Tunisia; Clay $10,000; Singles and doubles draws	(Portugal) Gonçalo Oliveira (Switzerland) Loïc Perret; 6–1, 3–6, [10–3]	(Brazil) Igor Marcondes (Brazil) Felipe Meligeni Alves	(France) Jonathan Kanar (Spain) Oriol Roca Batalla	(Italy) Matteo Tinelli (France) Théo Fournerie (Italy) Davide Galoppini (Colombia) Cristian Rodríguez
November 28	Turkey F48 Futures; Antalya, Turkey; Hard $10,000; Singles and doubles draws	(Portugal) Frederico Ferreira Silva; 6–2, 6–3	(Italy) Lorenzo Frigerio	(Italy) Adelchi Virgili (Germany) Marc Sieber	(Turkey) Marsel İlhan (Monaco) Lucas Catarina (Bulgaria) Alexandar Lazov (Italy) Francesco Vilardo
November 28	Turkey F48 Futures; Antalya, Turkey; Hard $10,000; Singles and doubles draws	(Turkey) Tuna Altuna (Turkey) Cem İlkel; 6–4, 6–2	(Ukraine) Marat Deviatiarov (Bulgaria) Alexandar Lazov	(Italy) Adelchi Virgili (Germany) Marc Sieber	(Turkey) Marsel İlhan (Monaco) Lucas Catarina (Bulgaria) Alexandar Lazov (Italy) Francesco Vilardo
November 28	Uruguay F1 Futures; Punta del Este, Uruguay; Clay $10,000; Singles and doubles draws	(Brazil) Orlando Luz; 4–6, 6–2, 6–2	(Brazil) João Pedro Sorgi	(Brazil) Caio Zampieri (Argentina) Gonzalo Villanueva	(Argentina) Mariano Kestelboim (Austria) Michael Linzer (Brazil) Marcelo Zormann (Uruguay) Rodrigo Arús
November 28	Uruguay F1 Futures; Punta del Este, Uruguay; Clay $10,000; Singles and doubles draws	(Argentina) Juan Pablo Ficovich (Argentina) Camilo Ugo Carabelli; 6–4, 4–6, [7–6], ret.	(Uruguay) Marcel Felder (Uruguay) Santiago Maresca	(Brazil) Caio Zampieri (Argentina) Gonzalo Villanueva	(Argentina) Mariano Kestelboim (Austria) Michael Linzer (Brazil) Marcelo Zormann (Uruguay) Rodrigo Arús

=== December ===
Week of	Tournament	Winner	Runners-up	Semifinalists	Quarterfinalists
December 5	USA F40 Futures; Tallahassee, United States; Hard (indoor) $25,000; Singles and doubles draws	(Canada) Brayden Schnur; 7–5, 3–6, 6–2	(United States) JC Aragone	(United States) Wil Spencer (Germany) Dominik Köpfer	(United States) Sekou Bangoura (Germany) Lukas Ollert (Japan) Kaichi Uchida (Netherlands) Tim van Rijthoven
December 5	USA F40 Futures; Tallahassee, United States; Hard (indoor) $25,000; Singles and doubles draws	(United States) Robert Galloway (United States) Nathaniel Lammons; 6–4, 5–7, [10–8]	(Tunisia) Mohamed Aziz Dougaz (Burundi) Guy Orly Iradukunda	(United States) Wil Spencer (Germany) Dominik Köpfer	(United States) Sekou Bangoura (Germany) Lukas Ollert (Japan) Kaichi Uchida (Netherlands) Tim van Rijthoven
December 5	Chile F6 Futures; Santiago, Chile; Clay $10,000; Singles and doubles draws	(Chile) Alejandro Tabilo; 6–4, 4–6, 6–3	(Argentina) Genaro Alberto Olivieri	(Chile) Bastián Malla (Argentina) Federico Moreno	(Brazil) Fernando Yamacita (Brazil) Pedro Sakamoto (Chile) Marcelo Tomás Barrios Vera (Argentina) Juan Pablo Paz
December 5	Chile F6 Futures; Santiago, Chile; Clay $10,000; Singles and doubles draws	(Chile) Jorge Montero (Chile) Alejandro Tabilo; 6–3, 6–4	(Chile) Jorge Aguilar (Chile) Víctor Núñez	(Chile) Bastián Malla (Argentina) Federico Moreno	(Brazil) Fernando Yamacita (Brazil) Pedro Sakamoto (Chile) Marcelo Tomás Barrios Vera (Argentina) Juan Pablo Paz
December 5	Czech Republic F12 Futures; Vestec, Czech Republic; Carpet (indoor) $10,000; Singles and doubles draws	(Netherlands) Niels Lootsma; 3–6, 6–2, 6–3	(Czech Republic) Tomáš Papík	(Czech Republic) Robin Staněk (Czech Republic) Michal Konečný	(Czech Republic) Marek Gengel (Germany) Sami Reinwein (Czech Republic) Jan Hernych (Czech Republic) Vít Kopřiva
December 5	Czech Republic F12 Futures; Vestec, Czech Republic; Carpet (indoor) $10,000; Singles and doubles draws	(Czech Republic) Tomáš Papík (Czech Republic) Matěj Vocel; 6–3, 6–2	(Austria) Sebastian Bader (Netherlands) Niels Lootsma	(Czech Republic) Robin Staněk (Czech Republic) Michal Konečný	(Czech Republic) Marek Gengel (Germany) Sami Reinwein (Czech Republic) Jan Hernych (Czech Republic) Vít Kopřiva
December 5	Dominican Republic F2 Futures; Santo Domingo, Dominican Republic; Clay $10,000; Singles and doubles draws	(Ecuador) Iván Endara; 6–2, 6–4	(France) Gianni Mina	(Argentina) Juan Ignacio Galarza (Brazil) Fernando Romboli	(Japan) Naoki Nakagawa (Russia) Alexander Zhurbin (Brazil) Bruno Sant'Anna (Dominican Republic) José Olivares
December 5	Dominican Republic F2 Futures; Santo Domingo, Dominican Republic; Clay $10,000; Singles and doubles draws	(Argentina) Juan Ignacio Galarza (Brazil) Fernando Romboli; 7–6^{(7–4)}, 6–4	(United States) Hunter Callahan (United States) Nicholas Hu	(Argentina) Juan Ignacio Galarza (Brazil) Fernando Romboli	(Japan) Naoki Nakagawa (Russia) Alexander Zhurbin (Brazil) Bruno Sant'Anna (Dominican Republic) José Olivares
December 5	Egypt F36 Futures; Cairo, Egypt; Clay $10,000; Singles and doubles draws	(United Kingdom) Jay Clarke; 6–4, 6–4	(Egypt) Youssef Hossam	(Russia) Ivan Nedelko (Germany) Julian Onken	(Brazil) Jordan Correia (Chile) Laslo Urrutia Fuentes (Russia) Alexander Igoshin (Egypt) Karim Hossam
December 5	Egypt F36 Futures; Cairo, Egypt; Clay $10,000; Singles and doubles draws	(India) Chandril Sood (India) Lakshit Sood; 6–1, 3–6, [10–6]	(Egypt) Mohamed Abdel-Aziz (Egypt) Youssef Hossam	(Russia) Ivan Nedelko (Germany) Julian Onken	(Brazil) Jordan Correia (Chile) Laslo Urrutia Fuentes (Russia) Alexander Igoshin (Egypt) Karim Hossam
December 5	Indonesia F5 Futures; Jakarta, Indonesia; Hard $10,000; Singles and doubles draws	(France) Enzo Couacaud; 6–3, 6–2	(Japan) Yusuke Takahashi	(Japan) Shintaro Imai (Japan) Makoto Ochi	(South Korea) Kim Cheong-eui (Japan) Kento Takeuchi (Japan) Renta Tokuda (Philippines) Francis Casey Alcantara
December 5	Indonesia F5 Futures; Jakarta, Indonesia; Hard $10,000; Singles and doubles draws	(South Korea) Chung Yun-seong (Japan) Shintaro Imai; 6–2, 3–6, [10–6]	(Japan) Issei Okamura (Japan) Kento Takeuchi	(Japan) Shintaro Imai (Japan) Makoto Ochi	(South Korea) Kim Cheong-eui (Japan) Kento Takeuchi (Japan) Renta Tokuda (Philippines) Francis Casey Alcantara
December 5	Israel F17 Futures; Ramat Gan, Israel; Hard $10,000; Singles and doubles draws	(France) David Guez; 5–7, 7–5, 6–3	(France) Alexandre Müller	(Germany) Jonas Lütjen (Italy) Claudio Fortuna	(Slovakia) Ivan Kosec (Israel) Daniel Cukierman (United States) Eric James Johnson (United States) John Lamble
December 5	Israel F17 Futures; Ramat Gan, Israel; Hard $10,000; Singles and doubles draws	(Austria) Maximilian Neuchrist (Austria) David Pichler; 6–0, 6–3	(France) David Guez (France) Mick Lescure	(Germany) Jonas Lütjen (Italy) Claudio Fortuna	(Slovakia) Ivan Kosec (Israel) Daniel Cukierman (United States) Eric James Johnson (United States) John Lamble
December 5	Qatar F5 Futures; Doha, Qatar; Hard $10,000; Singles and doubles draws	(India) Ramkumar Ramanathan; 7–5, 6–3	(Austria) Sebastian Ofner	(France) Matthieu Roy (Italy) Edoardo Eremin	(France) Geoffrey Blancaneaux (Uzbekistan) Sanjar Fayziev (Germany) Daniel Altmaier (Austria) Lenny Hampel
December 5	Qatar F5 Futures; Doha, Qatar; Hard $10,000; Singles and doubles draws	(United Kingdom) Scott Clayton (United Kingdom) Jonny O'Mara; 6–0, 6–0	(France) Baptiste Crepatte (France) Quentin Folliot	(France) Matthieu Roy (Italy) Edoardo Eremin	(France) Geoffrey Blancaneaux (Uzbekistan) Sanjar Fayziev (Germany) Daniel Altmaier (Austria) Lenny Hampel
December 5	Tunisia F35 Futures; Hammamet, Tunisia; Clay $10,000; Singles and doubles draws	(Hungary) Attila Balázs; 6–2, 6–3	(Portugal) Gonçalo Oliveira	(Switzerland) Loïc Perret (Italy) Alessandro Luisi	(Brazil) Igor Marcondes (Netherlands) Marc Dijkhuizen (Portugal) André Gaspar Murta (Italy) Raúl Brancaccio
December 5	Tunisia F35 Futures; Hammamet, Tunisia; Clay $10,000; Singles and doubles draws	(Italy) Filippo Baldi (Italy) Alessandro Petrone; 1–6, 6–3, [11–9]	(Ukraine) Filipp Kekercheni (Portugal) Gonçalo Oliveira	(Switzerland) Loïc Perret (Italy) Alessandro Luisi	(Brazil) Igor Marcondes (Netherlands) Marc Dijkhuizen (Portugal) André Gaspar Murta (Italy) Raúl Brancaccio
December 5	Turkey F49 Futures; Antalya, Turkey; Hard $10,000; Singles and doubles draws	(Bulgaria) Alexandar Lazov; 7–6^{(8–6)}, 7–5	(Croatia) Borna Gojo	(Turkey) Marsel İlhan (Italy) Lorenzo Frigerio	(Italy) Francesco Vilardo (Zimbabwe) Takanyi Garanganga (Romania) Petru-Alexandru Luncanu (Germany) Marc Sieber
December 5	Turkey F49 Futures; Antalya, Turkey; Hard $10,000; Singles and doubles draws	(Turkey) Tuna Altuna (Russia) Alexander Pavlioutchenkov; 3–6, 6–3, [14–12]	(Croatia) Borna Gojo (Czech Republic) Ondřej Krstev	(Turkey) Marsel İlhan (Italy) Lorenzo Frigerio	(Italy) Francesco Vilardo (Zimbabwe) Takanyi Garanganga (Romania) Petru-Alexandru Luncanu (Germany) Marc Sieber
December 5	Uruguay F2 Futures; Paysandú, Uruguay; Clay $10,000; Singles and doubles draws	(Austria) Michael Linzer; 6–0, 6–3	(Argentina) Facundo Mena	(Japan) Ryusei Makiguchi (Brazil) João Pedro Sorgi	(Argentina) Juan Pablo Ficovich (Argentina) Camilo Ugo Carabelli (Argentina) Gonzalo Villanueva (Brazil) Oscar José Gutierrez
December 5	Uruguay F2 Futures; Paysandú, Uruguay; Clay $10,000; Singles and doubles draws	(Brazil) Rafael Matos (Brazil) João Menezes; 6–0, 6–4	(Brazil) Oscar José Gutierrez (Brazil) Nicolas Santos	(Japan) Ryusei Makiguchi (Brazil) João Pedro Sorgi	(Argentina) Juan Pablo Ficovich (Argentina) Camilo Ugo Carabelli (Argentina) Gonzalo Villanueva (Brazil) Oscar José Gutierrez
December 12	Chile F7 Futures; Talca, Chile; Clay $10,000; Singles and doubles draws	(Chile) Nicolás Jarry; 2–6, 6–1, 6–4	(Chile) Cristóbal Saavedra	(Peru) Juan Pablo Varillas (Brazil) Pedro Sakamoto	(Brazil) Alex Blumenberg (Argentina) Franco Agamenone (Chile) Esteban Bruna (Argentina) Juan Pablo Paz
December 12	Chile F7 Futures; Talca, Chile; Clay $10,000; Singles and doubles draws	(Argentina) Franco Agamenone (Argentina) Franco Emanuel Egea; 6–3, 6–3	(Brazil) Marcelo Tebet (Brazil) Fernando Yamacita	(Peru) Juan Pablo Varillas (Brazil) Pedro Sakamoto	(Brazil) Alex Blumenberg (Argentina) Franco Agamenone (Chile) Esteban Bruna (Argentina) Juan Pablo Paz
December 12	Dominican Republic F3 Futures; Santo Domingo Este, Dominican Republic; Hard $10,000; Singles and doubles draws	(United States) Evan King; 6–4, 7–6^{(11–9)}	(France) Calvin Hemery	(Brazil) Bruno Sant'Anna (United States) Shane Vinsant	(Ecuador) Iván Endara (Japan) Kaichi Uchida (Zimbabwe) Benjamin Lock (Serbia) Ilija Vučić
December 12	Dominican Republic F3 Futures; Santo Domingo Este, Dominican Republic; Hard $10,000; Singles and doubles draws	(United States) Alexios Halebian (United States) Evan King; 6–4, 6–4	(Serbia) Nebojša Perić (Serbia) Ilija Vučić	(Brazil) Bruno Sant'Anna (United States) Shane Vinsant	(Ecuador) Iván Endara (Japan) Kaichi Uchida (Zimbabwe) Benjamin Lock (Serbia) Ilija Vučić
December 12	Egypt F37 Futures; Cairo, Egypt; Clay $10,000; Singles and doubles draws	(Chile) Laslo Urrutia Fuentes; 6–0, 6–1	(Ukraine) Yurii Dzhavakian	(Russia) Ivan Nedelko (Brazil) Jordan Correia	(Egypt) Sherif Sabry (India) Chandril Sood (Egypt) Youssef Hossam (Lebanon) Giovani Samaha
December 12	Egypt F37 Futures; Cairo, Egypt; Clay $10,000; Singles and doubles draws	(India) Chandril Sood (India) Lakshit Sood; 1–6, 7–6^{(9–7)}, [10–5]	(Ukraine) Oleg Khotkov (Russia) Ivan Nedelko	(Russia) Ivan Nedelko (Brazil) Jordan Correia	(Egypt) Sherif Sabry (India) Chandril Sood (Egypt) Youssef Hossam (Lebanon) Giovani Samaha
December 12	Indonesia F6 Futures; Jakarta, Indonesia; Hard $10,000; Singles and doubles draws	(France) Enzo Couacaud; 6–1, 6–1	(Japan) Kento Takeuchi	(Poland) Maciej Smoła (Chinese Taipei) Hung Jui-chen	(South Korea) Kim Cheong-eui (Australia) Jake Delaney (India) Sidharth Rawat (Philippines) Francis Casey Alcantara
December 12	Indonesia F6 Futures; Jakarta, Indonesia; Hard $10,000; Singles and doubles draws	(Indonesia) Justin Barki (Indonesia) Christopher Rungkat; 6–4, 6–4	(Poland) Karol Drzewiecki (Poland) Maciej Smoła	(Poland) Maciej Smoła (Chinese Taipei) Hung Jui-chen	(South Korea) Kim Cheong-eui (Australia) Jake Delaney (India) Sidharth Rawat (Philippines) Francis Casey Alcantara
December 12	Israel F18 Futures; Ramat Gan, Israel; Hard $10,000; Singles and doubles draws	(Belgium) Romain Barbosa; 6–4, 6–3	(France) David Guez	(Israel) Tal Goldengoren (Germany) Jonas Lütjen	(United States) John Lamble (Israel) Daniel Cukierman (Israel) Shahar Elbaz (Portugal) Bernardo Saraiva
December 12	Israel F18 Futures; Ramat Gan, Israel; Hard $10,000; Singles and doubles draws	(Austria) David Pichler (Portugal) Bernardo Saraiva; Walkover	(Israel) Shahar Elbaz (Ukraine) Volodymyr Uzhylovskyi	(Israel) Tal Goldengoren (Germany) Jonas Lütjen	(United States) John Lamble (Israel) Daniel Cukierman (Israel) Shahar Elbaz (Portugal) Bernardo Saraiva
December 12	Qatar F6 Futures; Doha, Qatar; Hard $10,000; Singles and doubles draws	(India) Ramkumar Ramanathan; 7–5, 6–3	(Austria) Sebastian Ofner	(Italy) Edoardo Eremin (Austria) Lenny Hampel	(United Kingdom) Scott Clayton (France) Geoffrey Blancaneaux (Poland) Marcin Gawron (China) Bai Yan
December 12	Qatar F6 Futures; Doha, Qatar; Hard $10,000; Singles and doubles draws	(United Kingdom) Scott Clayton (United Kingdom) Jonny O'Mara; 7–6^{(7–0)}, 6–4	(Italy) Edoardo Eremin (Italy) Julian Ocleppo	(Italy) Edoardo Eremin (Austria) Lenny Hampel	(United Kingdom) Scott Clayton (France) Geoffrey Blancaneaux (Poland) Marcin Gawron (China) Bai Yan
December 12	Thailand F4 Futures; Hua Hin, Thailand; Hard $10,000; Singles and doubles draws	(France) Fabien Reboul; 6–7^{(3–7)}, 6–2, 7–6^{(7–5)}	(France) Sadio Doumbia	(South Korea) Lim Yong-kyu (South Korea) Chung Hong	(Thailand) Pol Wattanakul (Thailand) Wishaya Trongcharoenchaikul (South Korea) Cho Min-hyeok (South Korea) Kim Jae-hwan
December 12	Thailand F4 Futures; Hua Hin, Thailand; Hard $10,000; Singles and doubles draws	(Thailand) Pruchya Isaro (Thailand) Chayanon Kaewsuto; Walkover	(South Korea) Lee Jea-moon (South Korea) Lim Yong-kyu	(South Korea) Lim Yong-kyu (South Korea) Chung Hong	(Thailand) Pol Wattanakul (Thailand) Wishaya Trongcharoenchaikul (South Korea) Cho Min-hyeok (South Korea) Kim Jae-hwan
December 12	Tunisia F36 Futures; Hammamet, Tunisia; Clay $10,000; Singles and doubles draws	(Hungary) Attila Balázs; 6–4, 6–2	(Italy) Raúl Brancaccio	(Italy) Filippo Baldi (Italy) Marco Bortolotti	(Italy) Walter Trusendi (Netherlands) Alban Meuffels (Colombia) Cristian Rodríguez (Austria) Gibril Diarra
December 12	Tunisia F36 Futures; Hammamet, Tunisia; Clay $10,000; Singles and doubles draws	(Italy) Marco Bortolotti (Italy) Francesco Salviato; 7–5, 7–5	(Colombia) Cristian Rodríguez (France) François-Arthur Vibert	(Italy) Filippo Baldi (Italy) Marco Bortolotti	(Italy) Walter Trusendi (Netherlands) Alban Meuffels (Colombia) Cristian Rodríguez (Austria) Gibril Diarra
December 12	Turkey F50 Futures; Antalya, Turkey; Hard $10,000; Singles and doubles draws	(Zimbabwe) Takanyi Garanganga; 6–4, 6–4	(France) Gleb Sakharov	(Republic of Ireland) Peter Bothwell (Poland) Andriej Kapaś	(Romania) Dragoș Dima (Bulgaria) Gabriel Donev (Romania) Petru-Alexandru Luncanu (Ukraine) Marat Deviatiarov
December 12	Turkey F50 Futures; Antalya, Turkey; Hard $10,000; Singles and doubles draws	(Romania) Patrick Grigoriu (Romania) Petru-Alexandru Luncanu; 6–4, 2–6, [10–6]	(Serbia) Darko Jandrić (Russia) Alexander Pavlioutchenkov	(Republic of Ireland) Peter Bothwell (Poland) Andriej Kapaś	(Romania) Dragoș Dima (Bulgaria) Gabriel Donev (Romania) Petru-Alexandru Luncanu (Ukraine) Marat Deviatiarov
December 12	Uruguay F3 Futures; Salto, Uruguay; Clay $10,000; Singles and doubles draws	(Austria) Michael Linzer; 6–3, 6–0	(Brazil) João Pedro Sorgi	(Argentina) Mariano Kestelboim (Brazil) Orlando Luz	(Uruguay) Marcel Felder (Argentina) Francisco Cerúndolo (Brazil) Oscar José Gutierrez (Brazil) Marcelo Zormann
December 12	Uruguay F3 Futures; Salto, Uruguay; Clay $10,000; Singles and doubles draws	(Brazil) Orlando Luz (Brazil) Marcelo Zormann; 7–6^{(7–2)}, 6–4	(Uruguay) Marcel Felder (Argentina) Gabriel Alejandro Hidalgo	(Argentina) Mariano Kestelboim (Brazil) Orlando Luz	(Uruguay) Marcel Felder (Argentina) Francisco Cerúndolo (Brazil) Oscar José Gutierrez (Brazil) Marcelo Zormann
December 19	Chile F8 Futures; Santiago, Chile; Clay $10,000; Singles and doubles draws	(Chile) Nicolás Jarry; 6–3, 6–3	(Chile) Bastián Malla	(Brazil) Pedro Sakamoto (Austria) Michael Linzer	(Argentina) Juan Pablo Paz (Argentina) Matías Franco Descotte (Argentina) Andrea Collarini (Chile) Cristóbal Saavedra
December 19	Chile F8 Futures; Santiago, Chile; Clay $10,000; Singles and doubles draws	(Chile) Nicolás Jarry (Chile) Guillermo Núñez; 6–3, 7–5	(Chile) Carlos José Cuevas (Argentina) Juan Pablo Paz	(Brazil) Pedro Sakamoto (Austria) Michael Linzer	(Argentina) Juan Pablo Paz (Argentina) Matías Franco Descotte (Argentina) Andrea Collarini (Chile) Cristóbal Saavedra
December 19	Hong Kong F4 Futures; Hong Kong; Hard $10,000; Singles and doubles draws	(India) Yuki Bhambri; 6–4, 7–5	(Japan) Shintaro Imai	(Japan) Shuichi Sekiguchi (Chinese Taipei) Wu Tung-lin	(Japan) Kento Takeuchi (China) He Yecong (United Kingdom) Jay Clarke (Chinese Taipei) Yu Cheng-yu
December 19	Hong Kong F4 Futures; Hong Kong; Hard $10,000; Singles and doubles draws	(Chinese Taipei) Hsieh Cheng-peng (Hong Kong) Yeung Pak-long; 5–7, 6–3, [10–4]	(Hong Kong) Karan Rastogi (Hong Kong) Wong Hong Kit	(Japan) Shuichi Sekiguchi (Chinese Taipei) Wu Tung-lin	(Japan) Kento Takeuchi (China) He Yecong (United Kingdom) Jay Clarke (Chinese Taipei) Yu Cheng-yu
December 19	Puerto Rico F1 Futures; Mayagüez, Puerto Rico; Hard $10,000; Singles and doubles draws	(United States) Thai-Son Kwiatkowski; 6–1, 6–4	(United States) Alexios Halebian	(Zimbabwe) Benjamin Lock (Canada) Brayden Schnur	(United States) Evan King (Brazil) Caio Silva (Serbia) Ilija Vučić (United States) Vasil Kirkov
December 19	Puerto Rico F1 Futures; Mayagüez, Puerto Rico; Hard $10,000; Singles and doubles draws	(Serbia) Nebojša Perić (Serbia) Ilija Vučić; 6–1, 6–3	(United States) Thai-Son Kwiatkowski (United States) Quinton Vega	(Zimbabwe) Benjamin Lock (Canada) Brayden Schnur	(United States) Evan King (Brazil) Caio Silva (Serbia) Ilija Vučić (United States) Vasil Kirkov
December 19	Thailand F5 Futures; Hua Hin, Thailand; Hard $10,000; Singles and doubles draws	(South Korea) Kwon Soon-woo; 6–2, 6–2	(Germany) Daniel Altmaier	(Kazakhstan) Denis Yevseyev (South Korea) Lee Jea-moon	(South Korea) Nam Hyun-woo (South Korea) Cho Min-hyeok (Poland) Adrian Andrzejczuk (Vietnam) Lý Hoàng Nam
December 19	Thailand F5 Futures; Hua Hin, Thailand; Hard $10,000; Singles and doubles draws	(France) Sadio Doumbia (France) Fabien Reboul; 6–3, 6–4	(South Korea) Kwon Soon-woo (South Korea) Lee Jea-moon	(Kazakhstan) Denis Yevseyev (South Korea) Lee Jea-moon	(South Korea) Nam Hyun-woo (South Korea) Cho Min-hyeok (Poland) Adrian Andrzejczuk (Vietnam) Lý Hoàng Nam
December 19	Turkey F51 Futures; Antalya, Turkey; Hard $10,000; Singles and doubles draws	(France) Gleb Sakharov; 6–3, 7–6^{(7–4)}	(Zimbabwe) Takanyi Garanganga	(Romania) Dragoș Dima (Turkey) Cem İlkel	(Germany) Bastian Wagner (Italy) Alessandro Petrone (Netherlands) Colin van Beem (Ukraine) Vadim Alekseenko
December 19	Turkey F51 Futures; Antalya, Turkey; Hard $10,000; Singles and doubles draws	(Turkey) Yankı Erel (Turkey) Cem İlkel; 6–4, 6–3	(Ukraine) Olexiy Kolisnyk (Ukraine) Oleg Prihodko	(Romania) Dragoș Dima (Turkey) Cem İlkel	(Germany) Bastian Wagner (Italy) Alessandro Petrone (Netherlands) Colin van Beem (Ukraine) Vadim Alekseenko
December 26	Hong Kong F5 Futures; Hong Kong; Hard $10,000; Singles and doubles draws	(Japan) Sora Fukuda; 0–6, 7–6^{(7–4)}, 7–6^{(8–6)}	(Japan) Shuichi Sekiguchi	(Japan) Shintaro Imai (United Kingdom) Jay Clarke	(France) Geoffrey Blancaneaux (China) Bai Yan (Japan) Jumpei Yamasaki (Chinese Taipei) Tseng Chun-hsin
December 26	Hong Kong F5 Futures; Hong Kong; Hard $10,000; Singles and doubles draws	(China) Bai Yan (China) He Yecong; 7–5, 6–4	(Hong Kong) Karan Rastogi (Hong Kong) Wong Chun-hun	(Japan) Shintaro Imai (United Kingdom) Jay Clarke	(France) Geoffrey Blancaneaux (China) Bai Yan (Japan) Jumpei Yamasaki (Chinese Taipei) Tseng Chun-hsin
December 26	Thailand F6 Futures; Hua Hin, Thailand; Hard $10,000; Singles and doubles draws	(Kazakhstan) Dmitry Popko; 6–4, 6–2	(France) Fabien Reboul	(South Korea) Chung Yun-seong (Chinese Taipei) Chen Ti	(Thailand) Pol Wattanakul (China) Sun Fajing (Thailand) Pruchya Isaro (Russia) Ivan Nedelko
December 26	Thailand F6 Futures; Hua Hin, Thailand; Hard $10,000; Singles and doubles draws	(Thailand) Sanchai Ratiwatana (Thailand) Sonchat Ratiwatana; 6–2, 6–1	(India) Rishab Agarwal (Germany) Pirmin Hänle	(South Korea) Chung Yun-seong (Chinese Taipei) Chen Ti	(Thailand) Pol Wattanakul (China) Sun Fajing (Thailand) Pruchya Isaro (Russia) Ivan Nedelko
