= 2014 ITF Men's Circuit (October–December) =

This article includes the 2014 ITF Men's Circuit tournaments which occurred between October and December 2014.

== Point distribution ==
Tournament Category	W	F	SF	QF	R16	R32
Futures 15,000+H	35	20	10	4	1	0
Futures 15,000	27	15	8	3	1	0
Futures 10,000+H	27	15	8	3	1	0
Futures 10,000	18	10	6	2	1	0

== Key ==
$15,000 tournaments
$10,000 tournaments

== Month ==
=== October ===
Week of	Tournament	Winner	Runners-up	Semifinalists	Quarterfinalists
October 6	Australia F7 Futures; Cairns, Australia; Hard $15,000	(United States) Jarmere Jenkins; 3–6, 6–3, 6–4	(Australia) Omar Jasika	(Australia) Christopher O'Connell (Australia) Blake Mott	(Australia) Dayne Kelly (Japan) Takuto Niki (Australia) Maverick Banes (United Kingdom) Brydan Klein
October 6	Australia F7 Futures; Cairns, Australia; Hard $15,000	(Japan) Yuuya Kibi (Japan) Takuto Niki; 1–6, 7–6^{(7–2)}, [10–4]	(United Kingdom) Brydan Klein (Australia) Dane Propoggia	(Australia) Christopher O'Connell (Australia) Blake Mott	(Australia) Dayne Kelly (Japan) Takuto Niki (Australia) Maverick Banes (United Kingdom) Brydan Klein
October 6	France F22 Futures; Saint-Dizier, France; Hard (indoor) $15,000	(France) Rémi Boutillier; 6–4, 6–4	(France) Laurent Lokoli	(France) Calvin Hemery (France) Corentin Denolly	(Belgium) Julien Cagnina (Switzerland) Siméon Rossier (France) Teri Groll (France) Hugo Nys
October 6	France F22 Futures; Saint-Dizier, France; Hard (indoor) $15,000	(France) Rémi Boutillier (France) Élie Rousset; 6–2, 4–6, [10–3]	(Netherlands) Sander Arends (Netherlands) Niels Lootsma	(France) Calvin Hemery (France) Corentin Denolly	(Belgium) Julien Cagnina (Switzerland) Siméon Rossier (France) Teri Groll (France) Hugo Nys
October 6	USA F27 Futures; Houston, United States; Hard $15,000	(United States) Adam El Mihdawy; 6–1, 2–6, 6–4	(Germany) Lukas Finzelberg	(United States) Jeff Dadamo (Brazil) Henrique Cunha	(United States) Alexander Sarkissian (United States) Michael Shabaz (United States) Evan King (Japan) Naoki Nakagawa
October 6	USA F27 Futures; Houston, United States; Hard $15,000	(Brazil) Henrique Cunha (Bulgaria) Dimitar Kutrovsky; 6–4, 6–4	(United States) Jeff Dadamo (United States) Evan King	(United States) Jeff Dadamo (Brazil) Henrique Cunha	(United States) Alexander Sarkissian (United States) Michael Shabaz (United States) Evan King (Japan) Naoki Nakagawa
October 6	Chile F5 Futures; Coquimbo, Chile; Clay $10,000	(Chile) Hans Podlipnik Castillo; 6–1, 3–6, 6–1	(Argentina) Nicolás Kicker	(Brazil) José Pereira (Brazil) Wilson Leite	(Chile) Jorge Aguilar (Argentina) Patricio Heras (Chile) Jorge Montero (Brazil) Fabrício Neis
October 6	Chile F5 Futures; Coquimbo, Chile; Clay $10,000	(Brazil) Fabrício Neis (Brazil) José Pereira; 5–7, 6–2, [13–11]	(Chile) Victor Núñez (Chile) Hans Podlipnik Castillo	(Brazil) José Pereira (Brazil) Wilson Leite	(Chile) Jorge Aguilar (Argentina) Patricio Heras (Chile) Jorge Montero (Brazil) Fabrício Neis
October 6	Egypt F27 Futures; Sharm El Sheikh, Egypt; Hard $10,000	(Bosnia and Herzegovina) Aldin Šetkić; 6–2, 6–2	(Belgium) Clément Geens	(Italy) Alessandro Bega (Cyprus) Petros Chrysochos	(France) Jérôme Inzerillo (Syria) Issam Haitham Taweel (Czech Republic) Libor Salaba (Italy) Daniele Capecchi
October 6	Egypt F27 Futures; Sharm El Sheikh, Egypt; Hard $10,000	(Italy) Matteo Marfia (Switzerland) Luca Margaroli; Walkover	(Czech Republic) Libor Salaba (Bosnia and Herzegovina) Aldin Šetkić	(Italy) Alessandro Bega (Cyprus) Petros Chrysochos	(France) Jérôme Inzerillo (Syria) Issam Haitham Taweel (Czech Republic) Libor Salaba (Italy) Daniele Capecchi
October 6	Germany F15 Futures; Leimen, Germany; Hard (indoor) $10,000	(Latvia) Mārtiņš Podžus; 7–5, 7–6^{7–3}	(Germany) Florian Fallert	(Czech Republic) Jan Mertl (Germany) Moritz Baumann	(United States) Peter Kobelt (Germany) Johannes Härteis (Germany) Marvin Netuschil (United States) Connor Smith
October 6	Germany F15 Futures; Leimen, Germany; Hard (indoor) $10,000	(United States) Peter Kobelt (United States) Connor Smith; 6–3, 6–2	(Germany) Kevin Krawietz (Germany) Hannes Wagner	(Czech Republic) Jan Mertl (Germany) Moritz Baumann	(United States) Peter Kobelt (Germany) Johannes Härteis (Germany) Marvin Netuschil (United States) Connor Smith
October 6	Italy F35 Futures; Pula, Italy; Clay $10,000	(Italy) Riccardo Sinicropi; 7–5, 6–4	(Netherlands) Scott Griekspoor	(Italy) Nicola Ghedin (Belgium) Joris De Loore	(Italy) Gianluca Mager (Switzerland) Jacob Kahoun (Italy) Gian Marco Moroni (Italy) Andrea Basso
October 6	Italy F35 Futures; Pula, Italy; Clay $10,000	(Italy) Davide Della Tommasina (Italy) Riccardo Sinicropi; 6–4, 6–7^{3–7}, [10–6]	(Italy) Andrea Basso (Italy) Matteo Volante	(Italy) Nicola Ghedin (Belgium) Joris De Loore	(Italy) Gianluca Mager (Switzerland) Jacob Kahoun (Italy) Gian Marco Moroni (Italy) Andrea Basso
October 6	Kazakhstan F13 Futures; Shymkent, Kazakhstan; Clay $10,000	(Spain) Enrique López Pérez; 6–2, 6–2	(France) Maxime Hamou	(Ukraine) Vladyslav Manafov (Serbia) Laslo Djere	(Bulgaria) Alexandar Lazov (Slovakia) Filip Horanský (Finland) Henrik Sillanpää (Georgia (country)) Aleksandre Metreveli
October 6	Kazakhstan F13 Futures; Shymkent, Kazakhstan; Clay $10,000	(Spain) Enrique López Pérez (India) Jeevan Nedunchezhiyan; 6–3, 6–3	(Bulgaria) Alexandar Lazov (Georgia (country)) Aleksandre Metreveli	(Ukraine) Vladyslav Manafov (Serbia) Laslo Djere	(Bulgaria) Alexandar Lazov (Slovakia) Filip Horanský (Finland) Henrik Sillanpää (Georgia (country)) Aleksandre Metreveli
October 6	Peru F7 Futures; Lima, Peru; Clay $10,000	(Peru) Duilio Beretta; 6–4, 6–1	(Chile) Juan Carlos Sáez	(Brazil) Eduardo Dischinger (Monaco) Benjamin Balleret	(Argentina) Gonzalo Villanueva (Guatemala) Christopher Díaz Figueroa (Austria) Michael Linzer (France) Maxime Tabatruong
October 6	Peru F7 Futures; Lima, Peru; Clay $10,000	(Monaco) Romain Arneodo (Monaco) Benjamin Balleret; 4–6, 6–3, [10–1]	(Peru) Jorge Brian Panta (Argentina) Eduardo Agustín Torre	(Brazil) Eduardo Dischinger (Monaco) Benjamin Balleret	(Argentina) Gonzalo Villanueva (Guatemala) Christopher Díaz Figueroa (Austria) Michael Linzer (France) Maxime Tabatruong
October 6	Portugal F9 Futures; Porto, Portugal; Clay $10,000	(Portugal) Frederico Gil; 6–7^{5–7}, 6–3, 6–0	(Portugal) Frederico Ferreira Silva	(Portugal) Rui Machado (Portugal) Leonardo Tavares	(Spain) David Pérez Sanz (Portugal) Duarte Vale (Portugal) André Gaspar Murta (France) Jules Marie
October 6	Portugal F9 Futures; Porto, Portugal; Clay $10,000	(Portugal) Frederico Gil (Portugal) Leonardo Tavares; 2–6, 6–3, [10–6]	(Portugal) Romain Barbosa (Portugal) Frederico Ferreira Silva	(Portugal) Rui Machado (Portugal) Leonardo Tavares	(Spain) David Pérez Sanz (Portugal) Duarte Vale (Portugal) André Gaspar Murta (France) Jules Marie
October 6	Spain F30 Futures; Sant Cugat del Vallès, Spain; Clay $10,000	(Spain) Roberto Carballés Baena; 6–4, 4–6, 6–2	(France) Alexis Musialek	(Spain) Oriol Roca Batalla (Spain) Gerard Granollers	(Spain) Eduard Esteve Lobato (Spain) Juan Lizariturry (Spain) Pol Toledo Bagué (Germany) Jean-Marc Werner
October 6	Spain F30 Futures; Sant Cugat del Vallès, Spain; Clay $10,000	(Spain) Juan Lizariturry (Spain) Oriol Roca Batalla; 7–5, 6–2	(Japan) Ryota Kishi (Poland) Adam Majchrowicz	(Spain) Oriol Roca Batalla (Spain) Gerard Granollers	(Spain) Eduard Esteve Lobato (Spain) Juan Lizariturry (Spain) Pol Toledo Bagué (Germany) Jean-Marc Werner
October 6	Turkey F35 Futures; Antalya, Turkey; Hard $10,000	(Bulgaria) Dimitar Kuzmanov; 6–1, 6–0	(Russia) Andrei Plotniy	(China) Zheng Weiqiang (Czech Republic) Jan Hájek	(New Zealand) Ben McLachlan (Japan) Yusuke Watanuki (Turkey) Barkın Yalçınkale (Japan) Takashi Saito
October 6	Turkey F35 Futures; Antalya, Turkey; Hard $10,000	(Japan) Takashi Saito (Japan) Kaichi Uchida; 7–5, 6–3	(Turkey) Tuna Altuna (Bulgaria) Dimitar Kuzmanov	(China) Zheng Weiqiang (Czech Republic) Jan Hájek	(New Zealand) Ben McLachlan (Japan) Yusuke Watanuki (Turkey) Barkın Yalçınkale (Japan) Takashi Saito
October 13	Australia F8 Futures; Toowoomba, Australia; Hard $15,000	(United States) Jarmere Jenkins; 6–3, 7–5	(Australia) Luke Saville	(Australia) Christopher O'Connell (Australia) Dane Propoggia	(Australia) Greg Jones (United States) Mitchell Krueger (Australia) Maverick Banes (Australia) Blake Mott
October 13	Australia F8 Futures; Toowoomba, Australia; Hard $15,000	(United States) Jarmere Jenkins (United States) Mitchell Krueger; 6–2, 6–2	(Australia) Jake Eames (Australia) Christopher O'Connell	(Australia) Christopher O'Connell (Australia) Dane Propoggia	(Australia) Greg Jones (United States) Mitchell Krueger (Australia) Maverick Banes (Australia) Blake Mott
October 13	Belarus F3 Futures; Minsk, Belarus; Hard (indoor) $15,000	(Belarus) Dzmitry Zhyrmont; 6–2, 3–6, 7–6^{(7–5)}	(Moldova) Maxim Dubarenco	(Lithuania) Laurynas Grigelis (France) Laurent Lokoli	(Lithuania) Lukas Mugevičius (Belarus) Ilya Ivashka (Ukraine) Maxim Ratniuk (Belarus) Artur Dubinski
October 13	Belarus F3 Futures; Minsk, Belarus; Hard (indoor) $15,000	(Lithuania) Laurynas Grigelis (Lithuania) Lukas Mugevičius; 6–4, 4–6, [10–6]	(Uzbekistan) Shonigmatjon Shofayziyev (Belarus) Andrei Vasilevski	(Lithuania) Laurynas Grigelis (France) Laurent Lokoli	(Lithuania) Lukas Mugevičius (Belarus) Ilya Ivashka (Ukraine) Maxim Ratniuk (Belarus) Artur Dubinski
October 13	USA F28 Futures; Mansfield, United States; Hard $15,000	(United Kingdom) Liam Broady; 1–6, 7–6^{7–2}, 6–0	(Bulgaria) Dimitar Kutrovsky	(Brazil) Henrique Cunha (United States) Michael Mmoh	(United Kingdom) Cameron Norrie (United States) Mitchell Frank (France) Tom Jomby (Australia) Andrew Harris
October 13	USA F28 Futures; Mansfield, United States; Hard $15,000	(United Kingdom) Liam Broady (United States) Dennis Novikov; 4–6, 6–3, [10–7]	(Brazil) Henrique Cunha (Bulgaria) Dimitar Kutrovsky	(Brazil) Henrique Cunha (United States) Michael Mmoh	(United Kingdom) Cameron Norrie (United States) Mitchell Frank (France) Tom Jomby (Australia) Andrew Harris
October 13	Zimbabwe F1 Futures; Harare, Zimbabwe; Hard $15,000	(Netherlands) Boy Westerhof; 6–3, 7–6^{(7–5)}	(South Africa) Ruan Roelofse	(South Africa) Tucker Vorster (Netherlands) Antal van der Duim	(South Africa) Nicolaas Scholtz (Spain) Óscar Hernández (France) Arthur Surreaux (France) Grégoire Barrère
October 13	Zimbabwe F1 Futures; Harare, Zimbabwe; Hard $15,000	(Netherlands) Antal van der Duim (Netherlands) Boy Westerhof; 3–6, 6–2, [10–7]	(France) Grégoire Barrère (France) Arthur Surreaux	(South Africa) Tucker Vorster (Netherlands) Antal van der Duim	(South Africa) Nicolaas Scholtz (Spain) Óscar Hernández (France) Arthur Surreaux (France) Grégoire Barrère
October 13	Brazil F9 Futures; Fernandópolis, Brazil; Clay $10,000	(Brazil) Caio Zampieri; 6–1, 2–6, 7–5	(Brazil) Daniel Dutra da Silva	(Brazil) André Miele (Brazil) Filipe Brandão	(Brazil) Carlos Eduardo Severino (Brazil) Pedro Sakamoto (Brazil) Fernando Romboli (Brazil) Rafael Matos
October 13	Brazil F9 Futures; Fernandópolis, Brazil; Clay $10,000	(Brazil) Daniel Dutra da Silva (Brazil) Pedro Sakamoto; 6–4, 6–2	(Brazil) Pedro Bernardi (Brazil) João Walendowsky	(Brazil) André Miele (Brazil) Filipe Brandão	(Brazil) Carlos Eduardo Severino (Brazil) Pedro Sakamoto (Brazil) Fernando Romboli (Brazil) Rafael Matos
October 13	Chile F6 Futures; Villa Alemana, Chile; Clay $10,000	(Chile) Cristóbal Saavedra Corvalán; 7–6^{(9–7)}, 6–3	(Brazil) José Pereira	(Chile) Jorge Aguilar (Argentina) Alan Kohen	(Chile) Jorge Montero (Chile) Benjamin Ugarte (Chile) Ricardo Urzúa-Rivera (Argentina) Mariano Kestelboim
October 13	Chile F6 Futures; Villa Alemana, Chile; Clay $10,000	(Chile) Cristóbal Saavedra Corvalán (Chile) Ricardo Urzúa-Rivera; 6–2, 7–5	(Chile) Jorge Montero (Chile) Simon Navarro	(Chile) Jorge Aguilar (Argentina) Alan Kohen	(Chile) Jorge Montero (Chile) Benjamin Ugarte (Chile) Ricardo Urzúa-Rivera (Argentina) Mariano Kestelboim
October 13	Egypt F28 Futures; Sharm El Sheikh, Egypt; Hard $10,000	(Bosnia and Herzegovina) Aldin Šetkić; 6–1, 6–4	(Italy) Alessandro Bega	(Czech Republic) Libor Salaba (Serbia) Nikola Milojević	(United Kingdom) Robbie Ridout (Italy) Daniele Capecchi (France) Jérôme Inzerillo (Italy) Matteo Marfia
October 13	Egypt F28 Futures; Sharm El Sheikh, Egypt; Hard $10,000	(Netherlands) Matwé Middelkoop (Egypt) Mohamed Safwat; 6–3, 6–4	(Egypt) Sherif Sabry (Czech Republic) Libor Salaba	(Czech Republic) Libor Salaba (Serbia) Nikola Milojević	(United Kingdom) Robbie Ridout (Italy) Daniele Capecchi (France) Jérôme Inzerillo (Italy) Matteo Marfia
October 13	France F23 Futures; Cap D'Agde, France; Hard (indoor) $10,000	(Belgium) Maxime Authom; 6–4, 6–2	(France) Alexandre Sidorenko	(France) Thomas Grinberg (France) Élie Rousset	(France) Jonathan Eysseric (France) Rudy Coco (France) Sébastien Boltz (France) Antoine Hoang
October 13	France F23 Futures; Cap D'Agde, France; Hard (indoor) $10,000	(Netherlands) Sander Groen (France) Alexandre Sidorenko; 6–4, 5–7, [10–8]	(Republic of Ireland) David O'Hare (United Kingdom) Joe Salisbury	(France) Thomas Grinberg (France) Élie Rousset	(France) Jonathan Eysseric (France) Rudy Coco (France) Sébastien Boltz (France) Antoine Hoang
October 13	Germany F16 Futures; Bad Salzdetfurth, Germany; Carpet (indoor) $10,000	(Czech Republic) Jan Mertl; 6–4, 2–6, 6–3	(Czech Republic) Marek Michalička	(Germany) Matthias Wunner (Netherlands) Alban Meuffels	(Czech Republic) Jan Blecha (United States) Connor Smith (Belgium) Christopher Heyman (United States) Peter Kobelt
October 13	Germany F16 Futures; Bad Salzdetfurth, Germany; Carpet (indoor) $10,000	(Germany) Kevin Krawietz (Germany) Maximilian Marterer; 6–3, 7–6^{(7–4)}	(Germany) Denis Kapric (Germany) Lukas Rüpke	(Germany) Matthias Wunner (Netherlands) Alban Meuffels	(Czech Republic) Jan Blecha (United States) Connor Smith (Belgium) Christopher Heyman (United States) Peter Kobelt
October 13	Greece F8 Futures; Heraklion, Greece; Hard $10,000	(Czech Republic) Jan Šátral; 4–6, 6–4, 6–1	(Belgium) Alexandre Folie	(Germany) Daniel Masur (Serbia) Boris Čonkić	(Slovenia) Tom Kočevar-Dešman (Venezuela) Ricardo Rodríguez (Czech Republic) Dušan Lojda (Italy) Thomas Fabbiano
October 13	Greece F8 Futures; Heraklion, Greece; Hard $10,000	(Germany) Peter Heller (Germany) Daniel Masur; 7–5, 6–2	(Czech Republic) Václav Šafránek (Czech Republic) Jan Šátral	(Germany) Daniel Masur (Serbia) Boris Čonkić	(Slovenia) Tom Kočevar-Dešman (Venezuela) Ricardo Rodríguez (Czech Republic) Dušan Lojda (Italy) Thomas Fabbiano
October 13	Italy F36 Futures; Pula, Italy; Clay $10,000	(France) Johan Sébastien Tatlot; 2–6, 7–5, 6–3	(Italy) Walter Trusendi	(Italy) Davide Della Tommasina (Italy) Gianluca Mager	(Italy) Antonio Campo (France) Samuel Bensoussan (Italy) Giorgio de Rossi (Belgium) Joris De Loore
October 13	Italy F36 Futures; Pula, Italy; Clay $10,000	(Italy) Salvatore Caruso (Italy) Gianluca Naso; 3–6, 6–3, [10–8]	(Italy) Davide Della Tommasina (Italy) Walter Trusendi	(Italy) Davide Della Tommasina (Italy) Gianluca Mager	(Italy) Antonio Campo (France) Samuel Bensoussan (Italy) Giorgio de Rossi (Belgium) Joris De Loore
October 13	Kazakhstan F14 Futures; Shymkent, Kazakhstan; Clay $10,000	(Spain) Enrique López Pérez; 6–3, 4–6, 6–1	(Russia) Ivan Gakhov	(Netherlands) Sebastiaan Bonapart (Ukraine) Alexandr Kushakov	(Finland) Henrik Sillanpää (Ukraine) Yurii Dzhavakian (Georgia (country)) George Tsivadze (Kazakhstan) Roman Khassanov
October 13	Kazakhstan F14 Futures; Shymkent, Kazakhstan; Clay $10,000	(Russia) Ivan Gakhov (Spain) Enrique López Pérez; 7–5, 6–3	(Russia) Alan Bzarov (Russia) Konstantin Gerlakh	(Netherlands) Sebastiaan Bonapart (Ukraine) Alexandr Kushakov	(Finland) Henrik Sillanpää (Ukraine) Yurii Dzhavakian (Georgia (country)) George Tsivadze (Kazakhstan) Roman Khassanov
October 13	Peru F8 Futures; Lima, Peru; Clay $10,000	(Peru) Duilio Beretta; 6–0, 6–4	(Ecuador) Gonzalo Escobar	(Monaco) Benjamin Balleret (Brazil) João Pedro Sorgi	(Ecuador) Emilio Gómez (Monaco) Romain Arneodo (Austria) Michael Linzer (Brazil) Tiago Lopes
October 13	Peru F8 Futures; Lima, Peru; Clay $10,000	(Ecuador) Gonzalo Escobar (Ecuador) Emilio Gómez; 6–3, 6–2	(Brazil) Eduardo Dischinger (Brazil) Tiago Lopes	(Monaco) Benjamin Balleret (Brazil) João Pedro Sorgi	(Ecuador) Emilio Gómez (Monaco) Romain Arneodo (Austria) Michael Linzer (Brazil) Tiago Lopes
October 13	Portugal F10 Futures; Ponta Delgada, Portugal; Hard $10,000	(Portugal) Frederico Ferreira Silva; 6–4, 6–3	(Republic of Ireland) Sam Barry	(Portugal) Frederico Gil (Spain) Javier Pulgar-García	(Spain) Andrés Artuñedo (Portugal) Nuno Deus (Portugal) André Gaspar Murta (Spain) Samuel Ribeiro Navarrete
October 13	Portugal F10 Futures; Ponta Delgada, Portugal; Hard $10,000	(Portugal) Gonçalo Falcão (Portugal) Frederico Gil; 6–4, 6–2	(Portugal) Romain Barbosa (Portugal) Frederico Ferreira Silva	(Portugal) Frederico Gil (Spain) Javier Pulgar-García	(Spain) Andrés Artuñedo (Portugal) Nuno Deus (Portugal) André Gaspar Murta (Spain) Samuel Ribeiro Navarrete
October 13	Spain F31 Futures; Madrid, Spain; Hard $10,000	(Spain) Oriol Roca Batalla; 7–5, 6–4	(Spain) Roberto Ortega Olmedo	(Spain) Jaime Pulgar-García (Belgium) Yannick Mertens	(Spain) Miguel Semmler (Spain) Alberto Romero de Ávila Senise (Spain) Pablo Vivero González (Spain) Gerard Granollers
October 13	Spain F31 Futures; Madrid, Spain; Hard $10,000	(Belgium) Yannick Mertens (Spain) Roberto Ortega Olmedo; 6–2, 6–4	(France) Antoine Escoffier (France) Matthieu Roy	(Spain) Jaime Pulgar-García (Belgium) Yannick Mertens	(Spain) Miguel Semmler (Spain) Alberto Romero de Ávila Senise (Spain) Pablo Vivero González (Spain) Gerard Granollers
October 13	Turkey F36 Futures; Antalya, Turkey; Hard $10,000	(Italy) Federico Gaio; 1–6, 6–0, 6–4	(Japan) Hiroyasu Ehara	(Bulgaria) Dimitar Kuzmanov (Czech Republic) Jan Hájek	(New Zealand) Ben McLachlan (Japan) Takashi Saito (France) Nicolas Rosenzweig (France) Yannick Jankovits
October 13	Turkey F36 Futures; Antalya, Turkey; Hard $10,000	(France) Yannick Jankovits (France) Nicolas Rosenzweig; 6–4, 3–6, 16–14	(Italy) Filippo Baldi (Italy) Pietro Licciardi	(Bulgaria) Dimitar Kuzmanov (Czech Republic) Jan Hájek	(New Zealand) Ben McLachlan (Japan) Takashi Saito (France) Nicolas Rosenzweig (France) Yannick Jankovits
October 20	Belarus F4 Futures; Minsk, Belarus; Hard (indoor) $15,000	(Russia) Evgenii Tiurnev; 2–6, 7–5, 7–6^{(7–4)}	(Russia) Victor Baluda	(Belarus) Egor Gerasimov (Russia) Konstantin Kravchuk	(Belarus) Dzmitry Zhyrmont (Turkey) Barış Ergüden (Russia) Anton Zaitcev (Belarus) Yaraslav Shyla
October 20	Belarus F4 Futures; Minsk, Belarus; Hard (indoor) $15,000	(Belarus) Siarhei Betau (Belarus) Aliaksandr Bury; 7–6^{(7–4)}, 7–6^{(7–5)}	(Belarus) Artur Dubinski (Belarus) Ivan Liutarevich	(Belarus) Egor Gerasimov (Russia) Konstantin Kravchuk	(Belarus) Dzmitry Zhyrmont (Turkey) Barış Ergüden (Russia) Anton Zaitcev (Belarus) Yaraslav Shyla
October 20	Czech Republic F4 Futures; Jablonec nad Nisou, Czech Republic; Carpet (indoor) $15,000	(Croatia) Nikola Mektić; 6–4, 6–4	(Czech Republic) Jan Hernych	(Belarus) Uladzimir Ignatik (Czech Republic) Jan Mertl	(Czech Republic) Marek Michalička (Czech Republic) Dominik Süč (Croatia) Filip Veger (Poland) Mateusz Kowalczyk
October 20	Czech Republic F4 Futures; Jablonec nad Nisou, Czech Republic; Carpet (indoor) $15,000	(Czech Republic) Marek Michalička (Czech Republic) Dominik Süč; 3–6, 6–2, [10–5]	(Czech Republic) Jan Kunčík (Czech Republic) Martin Suchánek	(Belarus) Uladzimir Ignatik (Czech Republic) Jan Mertl	(Czech Republic) Marek Michalička (Czech Republic) Dominik Süč (Croatia) Filip Veger (Poland) Mateusz Kowalczyk
October 20	France F24 Futures; Rodez, France; Hard (indoor) $15,000	(Belgium) Maxime Authom; 7–5, 0–6, 6–3	(Italy) Adelchi Virgili	(France) Maxime Teixeira (France) Jonathan Eysseric	(Belgium) Ruben Bemelmans (Belgium) Niels Desein (Germany) Robin Kern (France) Constantin Bélot
October 20	France F24 Futures; Rodez, France; Hard (indoor) $15,000	(Republic of Ireland) James Cluskey (Republic of Ireland) David O'Hare; 7–6^{(7–5)}, 3–6, [10–8]	(Belgium) Maxime Authom (Belgium) Ruben Bemelmans	(France) Maxime Teixeira (France) Jonathan Eysseric	(Belgium) Ruben Bemelmans (Belgium) Niels Desein (Germany) Robin Kern (France) Constantin Bélot
October 20	Great Britain F17 Futures; Manchester, Great Britain; Hard (indoor) $15,000	(United Kingdom) Tom Farquharson; 6–4, 6–1	(Switzerland) Adrien Bossel	(France) Jules Marie (Netherlands) Wesley Koolhof	(Germany) Robin Lang (United Kingdom) Joshua Milton (United Kingdom) Luke Bambridge (Lithuania) Laurynas Grigelis
October 20	Great Britain F17 Futures; Manchester, Great Britain; Hard (indoor) $15,000	(Lithuania) Laurynas Grigelis (United Kingdom) David Rice; 6–4, 6–4	(United Kingdom) Sean Thornley (United Kingdom) Darren Walsh	(France) Jules Marie (Netherlands) Wesley Koolhof	(Germany) Robin Lang (United Kingdom) Joshua Milton (United Kingdom) Luke Bambridge (Lithuania) Laurynas Grigelis
October 20	Spain F32 Futures; Madrid, Spain; Hard $15,000	(Belgium) Yannick Mertens; 6–3, 7–5	(Spain) Pablo Vivero González	(Italy) Roberto Marcora (Colombia) Juan Sebastián Gómez	(Spain) Oriol Roca Batalla (Spain) Jaime Pulgar-García (Spain) Roberto Ortega Olmedo (Spain) Gerard Granollers
October 20	Spain F32 Futures; Madrid, Spain; Hard $15,000	(Spain) Gerard Granollers (Spain) Oriol Roca Batalla; 7–6^{(7–4)}, 6–0	(Spain) David Pérez Sanz (Spain) Ricardo Villacorta Alonso	(Italy) Roberto Marcora (Colombia) Juan Sebastián Gómez	(Spain) Oriol Roca Batalla (Spain) Jaime Pulgar-García (Spain) Roberto Ortega Olmedo (Spain) Gerard Granollers
October 20	USA F29 Futures; Brownsville, United States; Hard $15,000	(United States) Michael Mmoh; 7–6^{(7–5)}, 6–1	(United States) Dennis Novikov	(Brazil) Henrique Cunha (United States) Deiton Baughman	(United Kingdom) Alexander Sendegeya (Mexico) Daniel Garza (France) Tom Jomby (Switzerland) Vullnet Tashi
October 20	USA F29 Futures; Brownsville, United States; Hard $15,000	(Mexico) Hans Hach Verdugo (Venezuela) Luis David Martínez; 7–6^{(7–3)}, 7–6^{(7–3)}	(Russia) Mikhail Fufygin (Russia) Vitali Reshetnikov	(Brazil) Henrique Cunha (United States) Deiton Baughman	(United Kingdom) Alexander Sendegeya (Mexico) Daniel Garza (France) Tom Jomby (Switzerland) Vullnet Tashi
October 20	Zimbabwe F2 Futures; Harare, Zimbabwe; Hard $15,000	(Netherlands) Boy Westerhof; 6–7^{(5–7)}, 7–5, 3–0 retired	(Netherlands) Antal van der Duim	(France) Arthur Surreaux (South Africa) Tucker Vorster	(South Africa) Nicolaas Scholtz (France) Mathieu Rodrigues (South Africa) Ruan Roelofse (France) Grégoire Barrère
October 20	Zimbabwe F2 Futures; Harare, Zimbabwe; Hard $15,000	(France) Grégoire Barrère (France) Arthur Surreaux; 6–1, 6–2	(South Africa) Keith-Patrick Crowley (South Africa) Ruan Roelofse	(France) Arthur Surreaux (South Africa) Tucker Vorster	(South Africa) Nicolaas Scholtz (France) Mathieu Rodrigues (South Africa) Ruan Roelofse (France) Grégoire Barrère
October 20	Brazil F10 Futures; Belém, Brazil; Hard $10,000	(Brazil) Ricardo Hocevar; 7–6^{(7–4)}, 6–4	(Brazil) Fabiano de Paula	(Brazil) Caio Zampieri (Brazil) Leonardo Civita-Telles	(Brazil) Marcos Vinicius da Silva Dias (Brazil) Daniel Dutra da Silva (Brazil) André Miele (Brazil) Carlos Eduardo Severino
October 20	Brazil F10 Futures; Belém, Brazil; Hard $10,000	(Brazil) Fernando Romboli (Brazil) Caio Zampieri; 6–3, 6–1	(Brazil) Daniel Dutra da Silva (Brazil) Pedro Sakamoto	(Brazil) Caio Zampieri (Brazil) Leonardo Civita-Telles	(Brazil) Marcos Vinicius da Silva Dias (Brazil) Daniel Dutra da Silva (Brazil) André Miele (Brazil) Carlos Eduardo Severino
October 20	Egypt F29 Futures; Sharm El Sheikh, Egypt; Hard $10,000	(Netherlands) Matwé Middelkoop; 7–5, 2–6, 6–3	(Egypt) Mohamed Safwat	(Bosnia and Herzegovina) Aldin Šetkić (Poland) Piotr Gadomski	(Belgium) Clément Geens (Austria) Gregor Hutterer (Serbia) Nikola Milojević (Belgium) Omar Salman
October 20	Egypt F29 Futures; Sharm El Sheikh, Egypt; Hard $10,000	(Netherlands) Matwé Middelkoop (Egypt) Mohamed Safwat; 7–6^{(7–1)}, 6–3	(Czech Republic) Libor Salaba (Poland) Jan Zieliński	(Bosnia and Herzegovina) Aldin Šetkić (Poland) Piotr Gadomski	(Belgium) Clément Geens (Austria) Gregor Hutterer (Serbia) Nikola Milojević (Belgium) Omar Salman
October 20	Germany F17 Futures; Göhren-Lebbin, Germany; Carpet (indoor) $10,000	(Germany) Mats Moraing; 7–6^{(7–4)}, 7–6^{(7–4)}	(Germany) Maximilian Marterer	(Germany) Matthias Wunner (Austria) Nicolas Reissig	(Germany) Lukas Rüpke (Netherlands) Alban Meuffels (Germany) Tom Schönenberg (Austria) Christian Trubrig
October 20	Germany F17 Futures; Göhren-Lebbin, Germany; Carpet (indoor) $10,000	(Germany) Maximilian Dinslaken (Germany) Mats Moraing; 3–6, 6–4, [10–6]	(Netherlands) Romano Frantzen (Netherlands) Alban Meuffels	(Germany) Matthias Wunner (Austria) Nicolas Reissig	(Germany) Lukas Rüpke (Netherlands) Alban Meuffels (Germany) Tom Schönenberg (Austria) Christian Trubrig
October 20	Greece F9 Futures; Heraklion, Greece; Hard $10,000	(France) Quentin Halys; 6–3, 6–2	(Venezuela) Ricardo Rodríguez	(Italy) Thomas Fabbiano (Italy) Omar Giacalone	(Italy) Riccardo Bellotti (Germany) Nico Matic (Greece) Alexandros Jakupovic (Serbia) Miljan Zekić
October 20	Greece F9 Futures; Heraklion, Greece; Hard $10,000	(France) Benjamin Bonzi (France) Quentin Halys; 6–2, 6–4	(Mexico) Mauricio Astorga (Mexico) Alberto Rojas-Maldonado	(Italy) Thomas Fabbiano (Italy) Omar Giacalone	(Italy) Riccardo Bellotti (Germany) Nico Matic (Greece) Alexandros Jakupovic (Serbia) Miljan Zekić
October 20	Italy F37 Futures; Pula, Italy; Clay $10,000	(Italy) Salvatore Caruso; 6–4, 7–5	(Italy) Gianluca Naso	(France) Maxime Hamou (Italy) Andrea Basso	(Italy) Pietro Rondoni (Germany) Daniel Altmaier (France) Johan Sébastien Tatlot (Italy) Erik Crepaldi
October 20	Italy F37 Futures; Pula, Italy; Clay $10,000	(Italy) Riccardo Bonadio (Italy) Pietro Rondoni; 7–5, 3–6, [10–3]	(Italy) Salvatore Caruso (Italy) Gianluca Naso	(France) Maxime Hamou (Italy) Andrea Basso	(Italy) Pietro Rondoni (Germany) Daniel Altmaier (France) Johan Sébastien Tatlot (Italy) Erik Crepaldi
October 20	Peru F9 Futures; Lima, Peru; Clay $10,000	(Chile) Juan Carlos Sáez; 4–6, 6–1, 6–1	(Monaco) Benjamin Balleret	(Austria) Michael Linzer (Brazil) Eduardo Dischinger	(France) Mathias Bourgue (Colombia) Felipe Mantilla (Peru) Mauricio Echazú (Ecuador) Iván Endara
October 20	Peru F9 Futures; Lima, Peru; Clay $10,000	(Monaco) Romain Arneodo (Monaco) Benjamin Balleret; 6–3, 7–5	(Brazil) Eduardo Dischinger (Brazil) Tiago Lopes	(Austria) Michael Linzer (Brazil) Eduardo Dischinger	(France) Mathias Bourgue (Colombia) Felipe Mantilla (Peru) Mauricio Echazú (Ecuador) Iván Endara
October 20	Portugal F11 Futures; Ponta Delgada, Portugal; Hard $10,000	(Portugal) Rui Machado; 6–2, 6–3	(Portugal) Frederico Ferreira Silva	(Portugal) João Domingues (Portugal) André Gaspar Murta	(Spain) Andrés Artuñedo (Spain) Jaume Munar (France) Laurent Rochette (Portugal) Duarte Vale
October 20	Portugal F11 Futures; Ponta Delgada, Portugal; Hard $10,000	(Portugal) João Domingues (Portugal) André Gaspar Murta; 6–1, 4–6, [10–8]	(France) Melik Feler (United Kingdom) Aswin Lizen	(Portugal) João Domingues (Portugal) André Gaspar Murta	(Spain) Andrés Artuñedo (Spain) Jaume Munar (France) Laurent Rochette (Portugal) Duarte Vale
October 20	Turkey F37 Futures; Antalya, Turkey; Hard $10,000	(Serbia) Peđa Krstin; 6–4, 7–5	(Russia) Kirill Dmitriev	(Croatia) Matija Pecotić (Italy) Federico Gaio	(Germany) Yannick Maden (Russia) Mikhail Vaks (France) Yannick Jankovits (Germany) Marc Sieber
October 20	Turkey F37 Futures; Antalya, Turkey; Hard $10,000	(Slovenia) Janez Semrajc (Austria) Tristan-Samuel Weissborn; 6–3, 5–7, [10–2]	(Russia) Kirill Dmitriev (Austria) Dennis Novak	(Croatia) Matija Pecotić (Italy) Federico Gaio	(Germany) Yannick Maden (Russia) Mikhail Vaks (France) Yannick Jankovits (Germany) Marc Sieber
October 27	Czech Republic F5 Futures; Opava, Czech Republic; Grass (indoor) $15,000	(Czech Republic) Jan Mertl; 6–1, 6–1	(Czech Republic) Jaroslav Pospíšil	(Czech Republic) Marek Jaloviec (Slovakia) Ivo Klec	(Czech Republic) Pavel Nejedlý (Slovakia) Adrian Sikora (Czech Republic) Michal Schmid (Czech Republic) Michal Konečný
October 27	Czech Republic F5 Futures; Opava, Czech Republic; Grass (indoor) $15,000	(Czech Republic) Jaroslav Pospíšil (Czech Republic) Jan Šátral; 7–6^{(7–4)}, 6–3	(Romania) Patrick Grigoriu (Romania) Costin Pavăl	(Czech Republic) Marek Jaloviec (Slovakia) Ivo Klec	(Czech Republic) Pavel Nejedlý (Slovakia) Adrian Sikora (Czech Republic) Michal Schmid (Czech Republic) Michal Konečný
October 27	Great Britain F18 Futures; Loughborough, Great Britain; Hard (indoor) $15,000	(Belgium) Maxime Authom; 6–2, 6–1	(Lithuania) Laurynas Grigelis	(United Kingdom) Daniel Cox (United Kingdom) Mark Whitehouse	(United Kingdom) Jonny O'Mara (United Kingdom) Joshua Milton (United Kingdom) Richard Gabb (United Kingdom) Jack Carpenter
October 27	Great Britain F18 Futures; Loughborough, Great Britain; Hard (indoor) $15,000	(United Kingdom) Scott Clayton (United Kingdom) Toby Martin; 6–4, 6–4	(Republic of Ireland) David O'Hare (United Kingdom) Joe Salisbury	(United Kingdom) Daniel Cox (United Kingdom) Mark Whitehouse	(United Kingdom) Jonny O'Mara (United Kingdom) Joshua Milton (United Kingdom) Richard Gabb (United Kingdom) Jack Carpenter
October 27	Norway F1 Futures; Oslo, Norway; Hard (indoor) $15,000	(France) Jules Marie; 6–0, 6–2	(Belgium) Yannick Mertens	(Netherlands) Niels Lootsma (Belgium) Joris De Loore	(Greece) Theodoros Angelinos (Sweden) Patrik Rosenholm (Sweden) Markus Eriksson (Finland) Micke Kontinen
October 27	Norway F1 Futures; Oslo, Norway; Hard (indoor) $15,000	(Sweden) Patrik Rosenholm (United Kingdom) Darren Walsh; 6–4, 3–6, [10–8]	(Croatia) Ivan Sabanov (Croatia) Matej Sabanov	(Netherlands) Niels Lootsma (Belgium) Joris De Loore	(Greece) Theodoros Angelinos (Sweden) Patrik Rosenholm (Sweden) Markus Eriksson (Finland) Micke Kontinen
October 27	Brazil F11 Futures; Porto Alegre, Brazil; Clay $10,000	(Chile) Cristian Garín; 6–2, 4–6, 6–4	(Brazil) Caio Zampieri	(Brazil) Tiago Lopes (Brazil) Pedro Sakamoto	(France) Mathias Bourgue (Bolivia) Hugo Dellien (Argentina) Nicolás Kicker (Brazil) Thales Turini
October 27	Brazil F11 Futures; Porto Alegre, Brazil; Clay $10,000	(Brazil) Fernando Romboli (Brazil) Caio Zampieri; 4–6, 6–3, [10–3]	(Brazil) Wilson Leite (Brazil) Fabrício Neis	(Brazil) Tiago Lopes (Brazil) Pedro Sakamoto	(France) Mathias Bourgue (Bolivia) Hugo Dellien (Argentina) Nicolás Kicker (Brazil) Thales Turini
October 27	Estonia F3 Futures; Tartu, Estonia; Carpet (indoor) $10,000	(Belarus) Dzmitry Zhyrmont; 6–4, 6–2	(Russia) Andrey Rublev	(Russia) Evgeny Karlovskiy (Belarus) Yaraslav Shyla	(Russia) Anton Zaitcev (Estonia) Vladimir Ivanov (Russia) Ivan Nedelko (Russia) Aleksandr Vasilenko
October 27	Estonia F3 Futures; Tartu, Estonia; Carpet (indoor) $10,000	(Russia) Aleksandr Vasilenko (Russia) Anton Zaitcev; 6–3, 6–3	(Russia) Evgeny Elistratov (Russia) Vladimir Polyakov	(Russia) Evgeny Karlovskiy (Belarus) Yaraslav Shyla	(Russia) Anton Zaitcev (Estonia) Vladimir Ivanov (Russia) Ivan Nedelko (Russia) Aleksandr Vasilenko
October 27	Greece F10 Futures; Heraklion, Greece; Hard $10,000	(Serbia) Ivan Bjelica; 7–5, 6–3	(Italy) Riccardo Bellotti	(France) Quentin Halys (Serbia) Miki Janković	(Austria) Pascal Brunner (Israel) Tal Goldengoren (Italy) Omar Giacalone (Greece) Alexandros Jakupovic
October 27	Greece F10 Futures; Heraklion, Greece; Hard $10,000	(Serbia) Ivan Bjelica (Serbia) Miljan Zekić; 6–3, 7–6^{(7–4)}	(Greece) Alexandros Jakupovic (Russia) Markos Kalovelonis	(France) Quentin Halys (Serbia) Miki Janković	(Austria) Pascal Brunner (Israel) Tal Goldengoren (Italy) Omar Giacalone (Greece) Alexandros Jakupovic
October 27	India F6 Futures; Kolkata, India; Clay $10,000	(India) Ranjeet Virali-Murugesan; 6–3, 6–4	(India) Sriram Balaji	(India) Vijay Sundar Prashanth (Chinese Taipei) Ho Chih-jen	(India) Akash Wagh (India) Vinayak Sharma Kaza (Argentina) Matías Franco Descotte (India) Sasikumar Mukund
October 27	India F6 Futures; Kolkata, India; Clay $10,000	(India) Sriram Balaji (India) Ranjeet Virali-Murugesan; 6–4, 6–2	(India) Vijay Sundar Prashanth (India) Vishnu Vardhan	(India) Vijay Sundar Prashanth (Chinese Taipei) Ho Chih-jen	(India) Akash Wagh (India) Vinayak Sharma Kaza (Argentina) Matías Franco Descotte (India) Sasikumar Mukund
October 27	Italy F38 Futures; Pula, Italy; Hard $10,000	(Italy) Nicola Ghedin; 3–6, 6–4, 6–4	(Italy) Gianluca Naso	(Italy) Erik Crepaldi (Italy) Walter Trusendi	(France) Maxime Hamou (Italy) Gianluca Mager (Italy) Salvatore Caruso (Italy) Andrea Basso
October 27	Italy F38 Futures; Pula, Italy; Hard $10,000	(Argentina) Gaston-Arturo Grimolizzi (Italy) Giorgio Portaluri; 6–4, 0–6, [10–6]	(Canada) Philip Bester (Italy) Matteo Volante	(Italy) Erik Crepaldi (Italy) Walter Trusendi	(France) Maxime Hamou (Italy) Gianluca Mager (Italy) Salvatore Caruso (Italy) Andrea Basso
October 27	Portugal F12 Futures; Elvas, Portugal; Hard $10,000	(Spain) Ricardo Ojeda Lara; 6–1, 6–3	(Portugal) Romain Barbosa	(Netherlands) Scott Griekspoor (Portugal) Leonardo Tavares	(Republic of Ireland) Sam Barry (Netherlands) Tallon Griekspoor (Portugal) João Domingues (Spain) Javier Pulgar-García
October 27	Portugal F12 Futures; Elvas, Portugal; Hard $10,000	(Portugal) Romain Barbosa (Portugal) Leonardo Tavares; Walkover	(Spain) Jaime Pulgar-García (Spain) Javier Pulgar-García	(Netherlands) Scott Griekspoor (Portugal) Leonardo Tavares	(Republic of Ireland) Sam Barry (Netherlands) Tallon Griekspoor (Portugal) João Domingues (Spain) Javier Pulgar-García
October 27	Turkey F38 Futures; Antalya, Turkey; Hard $10,000	(Egypt) Mohamed Safwat; 7–5, 3–6, 6–4	(Germany) Marc Sieber	(Italy) Federico Gaio (Kazakhstan) Dmitry Popko	(Serbia) Peđa Krstin (Ukraine) Marat Deviatiarov (Lithuania) Lukas Mugevičius (Mexico) Lucas Gómez
October 27	Turkey F38 Futures; Antalya, Turkey; Hard $10,000	(Germany) Adrian Obert (Germany) Paul Wörner; 6–3, 1–6, [10–8]	(Slovenia) Janez Semrajc (Austria) Tristan-Samuel Weissborn	(Italy) Federico Gaio (Kazakhstan) Dmitry Popko	(Serbia) Peđa Krstin (Ukraine) Marat Deviatiarov (Lithuania) Lukas Mugevičius (Mexico) Lucas Gómez

=== November ===
Week of	Tournament	Winner	Runners-up	Semifinalists	Quarterfinalists
November 3	Great Britain F19 Futures; Bath, Great Britain; Hard (indoor) $15,000	(Belgium) Maxime Authom; 6–2, 6–4	(United Kingdom) Joshua Milton	(United Kingdom) Daniel Smethurst (United Kingdom) David Rice	(France) Nicolas Rosenzweig (Poland) Adam Chadaj (United Kingdom) Marshall Tutu (Switzerland) Sandro Ehrat
November 3	Great Britain F19 Futures; Bath, Great Britain; Hard (indoor) $15,000	(Republic of Ireland) David O'Hare (United Kingdom) Joe Salisbury; 6–1, 6–2	(United Kingdom) Richard Gabb (United Kingdom) Jonny O'Mara	(United Kingdom) Daniel Smethurst (United Kingdom) David Rice	(France) Nicolas Rosenzweig (Poland) Adam Chadaj (United Kingdom) Marshall Tutu (Switzerland) Sandro Ehrat
November 3	Norway F2 Futures; Oslo, Norway; Hard (indoor) $15,000	(France) Julien Obry; 6–2, 6–3	(Belgium) Joris De Loore	(Colombia) Eduardo Struvay (Belgium) Yannick Mertens	(Norway) Viktor Durasovic (France) Romain Bauvy (Finland) Micke Kontinen (United States) Kyle McMorrow
November 3	Norway F2 Futures; Oslo, Norway; Hard (indoor) $15,000	(Croatia) Ivan Sabanov (Croatia) Matej Sabanov; 4–6, 6–3, [10–4]	(Netherlands) Sander Arends (United Kingdom) Darren Walsh	(Colombia) Eduardo Struvay (Belgium) Yannick Mertens	(Norway) Viktor Durasovic (France) Romain Bauvy (Finland) Micke Kontinen (United States) Kyle McMorrow
November 3	Brazil F12 Futures; São Paulo, Brazil; Clay $10,000	(Uruguay) Martín Cuevas; 6–4, 6–4	(Brazil) Wilson Leite	(Brazil) Fabiano de Paula (Chile) Cristian Garín	(Brazil) Caio Zampieri (Brazil) José Pereira (Brazil) Carlos Alberto Longhi Neto (Brazil) Daniel Dutra da Silva
November 3	Brazil F12 Futures; São Paulo, Brazil; Clay $10,000	(Brazil) Orlando Luz (Brazil) Fernando Romboli; 6–7^{(3–7)}, 6–2, [11–9]	(Brazil) Daniel Dutra da Silva (Brazil) Pedro Sakamoto	(Brazil) Fabiano de Paula (Chile) Cristian Garín	(Brazil) Caio Zampieri (Brazil) José Pereira (Brazil) Carlos Alberto Longhi Neto (Brazil) Daniel Dutra da Silva
November 3	Estonia F4 Futures; Tallinn, Estonia; Hard (indoor) $10,000	(Estonia) Jürgen Zopp; 6–1, 6–4	(Russia) Evgeny Elistratov	(Moldova) Maxim Dubarenco (Belarus) Dzmitry Zhyrmont	(Germany) Matthias Wunner (Estonia) Vladimir Ivanov (Sweden) Christoffer Solberg (Belarus) Andrei Vasilevski
November 3	Estonia F4 Futures; Tallinn, Estonia; Hard (indoor) $10,000	(Russia) Alexander Bublik (Russia) Evgenii Tiurnev; 6–4, 6–7^{(5–7)}, [10–1]	(Spain) Iván Arenas-Gualda (Spain) Jorge Hernando Ruano	(Moldova) Maxim Dubarenco (Belarus) Dzmitry Zhyrmont	(Germany) Matthias Wunner (Estonia) Vladimir Ivanov (Sweden) Christoffer Solberg (Belarus) Andrei Vasilevski
November 3	Greece F11 Futures; Heraklion, Greece; Hard $10,000	(Russia) Roman Safiullin; 6–0, 3–6, 6–3	(Serbia) Ivan Bjelica	(Italy) Riccardo Bellotti (Netherlands) Tim van Rijthoven	(Greece) Alexandros Jakupovic (Serbia) Denis Bejtulahi (Greece) Stefanos Tsitsipas (Serbia) Miki Janković
November 3	Greece F11 Futures; Heraklion, Greece; Hard $10,000	(Greece) Alexandros Jakupovic (Russia) Markos Kalovelonis; 7–6^{(7–1)}, 7–6^{(7–4)}	(Belgium) Sander Gillé (France) Alexis Musialek	(Italy) Riccardo Bellotti (Netherlands) Tim van Rijthoven	(Greece) Alexandros Jakupovic (Serbia) Denis Bejtulahi (Greece) Stefanos Tsitsipas (Serbia) Miki Janković
November 3	India F7 Futures; Raipur, India; Hard $10,000	(India) Ramkumar Ramanathan; 6–1, 6–2	(India) Saketh Myneni	(India) Sriram Balaji (India) Vijay Sundar Prashanth	(India) Mohit Mayur Jayaprakash (Thailand) Chayanon Kaewsuto (India) Jeevan Nedunchezhiyan (India) Vishnu Vardhan
November 3	India F7 Futures; Raipur, India; Hard $10,000	(India) Jeevan Nedunchezhiyan (India) Vishnu Vardhan; 2–6, 6–3, [10–6]	(India) Vinayak Sharma Kaza (India) Vijay Sundar Prashanth	(India) Sriram Balaji (India) Vijay Sundar Prashanth	(India) Mohit Mayur Jayaprakash (Thailand) Chayanon Kaewsuto (India) Jeevan Nedunchezhiyan (India) Vishnu Vardhan
November 3	Italy F39 Futures; Pula, Italy; Clay $10,000	(Italy) Gianluca Naso; 6–4, 6–3	(Italy) Gianluca Mager	(Italy) Riccardo Sinicropi (Germany) Daniel Altmaier	(Italy) Walter Trusendi (Argentina) Gaston-Arturo Grimolizzi (Italy) David Della Tommasina (Italy) Erik Crepaldi
November 3	Italy F39 Futures; Pula, Italy; Clay $10,000	(Canada) Philip Bester (Italy) Matteo Volante; 6–2, 6–4	(Argentina) Gaston-Arturo Grimolizzi (Italy) Giorgio Portaluri	(Italy) Riccardo Sinicropi (Germany) Daniel Altmaier	(Italy) Walter Trusendi (Argentina) Gaston-Arturo Grimolizzi (Italy) David Della Tommasina (Italy) Erik Crepaldi
November 3	Morocco F4 Futures; Casablanca, Morocco; Clay $10,000	(Spain) Gerard Granollers; 6–4, 6–2	(Netherlands) Matwé Middelkoop	(Germany) Jean-Marc Werner (Czech Republic) Dušan Lojda	(Morocco) Yassine Idmbarek (Morocco) Lamine Ouahab (Italy) Filippo Leonardi (Netherlands) Miliaan Niesten
November 3	Morocco F4 Futures; Casablanca, Morocco; Clay $10,000	(Czech Republic) Dušan Lojda (Netherlands) Matwé Middelkoop; 6–1, 6–2	(Morocco) Yassine Idmbarek (Morocco) Mehdi Jdi	(Germany) Jean-Marc Werner (Czech Republic) Dušan Lojda	(Morocco) Yassine Idmbarek (Morocco) Lamine Ouahab (Italy) Filippo Leonardi (Netherlands) Miliaan Niesten
November 3	Tunisia F6 Futures; Sousse, Tunisia; Hard $10,000	(Italy) Alessandro Bega; 6–1, 6–2	(Belgium) Germain Gigounon	(Italy) Omar Giacalone (Belgium) Julien Cagnina	(Italy) Francesco Vilardo (France) Grégoire Barrère (Canada) Steven Diez (Russia) Bogdan Bobrov
November 3	Tunisia F6 Futures; Sousse, Tunisia; Hard $10,000	(Belgium) Julien Cagnina (Belgium) Germain Gigounon; 6–1, 3–6, [10–5]	(Spain) Sergio Martos Gornés (Spain) Óscar Mesquida Berg	(Italy) Omar Giacalone (Belgium) Julien Cagnina	(Italy) Francesco Vilardo (France) Grégoire Barrère (Canada) Steven Diez (Russia) Bogdan Bobrov
November 3	Turkey F39 Futures; Antalya, Turkey; Hard $10,000	(Turkey) Cem İlkel; 6–3, 6–1	(Kazakhstan) Dmitry Popko	(Russia) Kirill Dmitriev (Ukraine) Vladyslav Manafov	(Ukraine) Dmytro Badanov (Serbia) Marko Tepavac (Czech Republic) Michal Konečný (France) Jonathan Kanar
November 3	Turkey F39 Futures; Antalya, Turkey; Hard $10,000	(South Africa) Damon Gooch (United States) Cameron Silverman; 4–6, 6–3, [10–7]	(Czech Republic) Michal Konečný (Czech Republic) Michal Schmid	(Russia) Kirill Dmitriev (Ukraine) Vladyslav Manafov	(Ukraine) Dmytro Badanov (Serbia) Marko Tepavac (Czech Republic) Michal Konečný (France) Jonathan Kanar
November 3	USA F30 Futures; Birmingham, United States; Clay $10,000	(Chile) Julio Peralta; 6–2, 6–1	(United States) Jean-Yves Aubone	(United States) Cătălin-Ionuț Gârd (Poland) Piotr Łomacki	(Barbados) Darian King (Australia) Jake Wynan (Japan) Naoki Nakagawa (United States) Reilly Opelka
November 3	USA F30 Futures; Birmingham, United States; Clay $10,000	(Chile) Julio Peralta (United States) Matt Seeberger; 6–3, 6–4	(United States) Cătălin-Ionuț Gârd (United States) Alex Rybakov	(United States) Cătălin-Ionuț Gârd (Poland) Piotr Łomacki	(Barbados) Darian King (Australia) Jake Wynan (Japan) Naoki Nakagawa (United States) Reilly Opelka
November 10	Australia F9 Futures; Wollongong, Australia; Hard $15,000	(United Kingdom) Brydan Klein; 6–3, 6–3	(Australia) Andrew Whittington	(United States) Jarmere Jenkins (Australia) Maverick Banes	(Australia) Gavin van Peperzeel (New Zealand) José Statham (Australia) Matthew Barton (Australia) Harry Bourchier
November 10	Australia F9 Futures; Wollongong, Australia; Hard $15,000	(Australia) Steven de Waard (Australia) Marc Polmans; 7–6^{(7–2)}, 7–6^{(7–2)}	(United States) Mitchell Krueger (Australia) Andrew Whittington	(United States) Jarmere Jenkins (Australia) Maverick Banes	(Australia) Gavin van Peperzeel (New Zealand) José Statham (Australia) Matthew Barton (Australia) Harry Bourchier
November 10	Brazil F13 Futures; Santa Maria, Brazil; Clay $15,000	(Argentina) Marco Trungelliti; 4–6, 7–5, 6–1	(Brazil) Fabiano de Paula	(Brazil) Daniel Dutra da Silva (Bolivia) Hugo Dellien	(Brazil) Fabrício Neis (Brazil) Eduardo Dischinger (Brazil) Orlando Luz (Brazil) Fernando Romboli
November 10	Brazil F13 Futures; Santa Maria, Brazil; Clay $15,000	(Brazil) Fabiano de Paula (Brazil) Fabrício Neis; 6–1, 6–4	(Brazil) Alex Blumenberg (Brazil) Leonardo Civita-Telles	(Brazil) Daniel Dutra da Silva (Bolivia) Hugo Dellien	(Brazil) Fabrício Neis (Brazil) Eduardo Dischinger (Brazil) Orlando Luz (Brazil) Fernando Romboli
November 10	Colombia F7 Futures; Manizales, Colombia; Clay $15,000	(Colombia) Eduardo Struvay; 6–4, 6–7^{(3–7)}, 6–4	(Colombia) Nicolás Barrientos	(Mexico) Manuel Sánchez (Argentina) Mateo Nicolás Martínez	(Peru) Jorge Brian Panta (Bolivia) Federico Zeballos (Argentina) Facundo Mena (Colombia) Alexander Pérez Cortez
November 10	Colombia F7 Futures; Manizales, Colombia; Clay $15,000	(Colombia) Nicolás Barrientos (Colombia) Eduardo Struvay; 7–5, 2–6, [10–5]	(Argentina) Mateo Nicolás Martínez (Argentina) Facundo Mena	(Mexico) Manuel Sánchez (Argentina) Mateo Nicolás Martínez	(Peru) Jorge Brian Panta (Bolivia) Federico Zeballos (Argentina) Facundo Mena (Colombia) Alexander Pérez Cortez
November 10	Mexico F12 Futures; Huatulco, Mexico; Hard $15,000	(Argentina) Agustín Velotti; 6–1, 4–6, 7–5	(Barbados) Darian King	(United States) Adam El Mihdawy (Guatemala) Christopher Díaz Figueroa	(United States) Evan Song (United States) Alexander Sarkissian (Venezuela) David Souto (Argentina) Maximiliano Estévez
November 10	Mexico F12 Futures; Huatulco, Mexico; Hard $15,000	(Guatemala) Christopher Díaz Figueroa (Mexico) Luis Patiño; 6–3, 3–6, [10–6]	(Venezuela) David Souto (Argentina) Agustín Velotti	(United States) Adam El Mihdawy (Guatemala) Christopher Díaz Figueroa	(United States) Evan Song (United States) Alexander Sarkissian (Venezuela) David Souto (Argentina) Maximiliano Estévez
November 10	Cyprus F1 Futures; Nicosia, Cyprus; Hard $10,000	(Slovakia) Adrian Sikora; 7–6^{(8–6)}, 6–1	(Bulgaria) Alexandar Lazov	(Serbia) Miljan Zekić (Belgium) Julien Dubail	(Belgium) Christopher Heyman (Cyprus) Petros Chrysochos (Netherlands) Paul Monteban (Romania) Teodor-Dacian Crăciun
November 10	Cyprus F1 Futures; Nicosia, Cyprus; Hard $10,000	(Italy) Marco Bortolotti (Italy) Erik Crepaldi; 6–3, 7–6^{(7–4)}	(Czech Republic) Michal Schmid (Slovakia) Adrian Sikora	(Serbia) Miljan Zekić (Belgium) Julien Dubail	(Belgium) Christopher Heyman (Cyprus) Petros Chrysochos (Netherlands) Paul Monteban (Romania) Teodor-Dacian Crăciun
November 10	Estonia F5 Futures; Pärnu, Estonia; Hard (indoor) $10,000	(Switzerland) Adrien Bossel; 6–7^{(2–7)}, 6–2, 6–4	(Lithuania) Lukas Mugevičius	(Estonia) Vladimir Ivanov (Russia) Evgenii Tiurnev	(Germany) Tom Schönenberg (Russia) Evgeny Elistratov (Sweden) Jacob Adaktusson (Russia) Victor Baluda
November 10	Estonia F5 Futures; Pärnu, Estonia; Hard (indoor) $10,000	(Russia) Richard Muzaev (Russia) Evgenii Tiurnev; 6–2, 6–3	(Spain) Iván Arenas-Gualda (Spain) Jorge Hernando-Ruano	(Estonia) Vladimir Ivanov (Russia) Evgenii Tiurnev	(Germany) Tom Schönenberg (Russia) Evgeny Elistratov (Sweden) Jacob Adaktusson (Russia) Victor Baluda
November 10	Greece F12 Futures; Heraklion, Greece; Hard $10,000	(Russia) Roman Safiullin; 4–6, 7–6^{(7–2)}, 6–4	(Serbia) Denis Bejtulahi	(Italy) Riccardo Bellotti (Serbia) Ivan Bjelica	(France) Romain Bauvy (Greece) Charalampos Kapogiannis (Serbia) Miki Janković (Greece) Stefanos Tsitsipas
November 10	Greece F12 Futures; Heraklion, Greece; Hard $10,000	(Serbia) Danilo Petrović (Serbia) Ilija Vučić; 7–5, 6–2	(Greece) Alexandros Jakupovic (Russia) Markos Kalovelonis	(Italy) Riccardo Bellotti (Serbia) Ivan Bjelica	(France) Romain Bauvy (Greece) Charalampos Kapogiannis (Serbia) Miki Janković (Greece) Stefanos Tsitsipas
November 10	India F8 Futures; Gwalior, India; Hard $10,000	(India) Sriram Balaji; 6–3, 6–7^{(4–7)}, 6–3	(India) Mohit Mayur Jayaprakash	(India) Vijay Sundar Prashanth (India) Christopher Marquis	(Chinese Taipei) Hung Jui-chen (India) Niki Kaliyanda Poonacha (India) Sasikumar Mukund (India) Jeevan Nedunchezhiyan
November 10	India F8 Futures; Gwalior, India; Hard $10,000	(India) Niki Kaliyanda Poonacha (India) Shahbaaz Khan; 6–2, 6–3	(India) Vinayak Sharma Kaza (India) Vijay Sundar Prashanth	(India) Vijay Sundar Prashanth (India) Christopher Marquis	(Chinese Taipei) Hung Jui-chen (India) Niki Kaliyanda Poonacha (India) Sasikumar Mukund (India) Jeevan Nedunchezhiyan
November 10	Kuwait F1 Futures; Mishref, Kuwait; Hard $10,000	(Austria) Christian Trubrig; 7–6^{(7–2)}, 6–3	(France) Calvin Hemery	(Spain) Roberto Ortega Olmedo (Slovakia) Ivo Klec	(Germany) Daniel Masur (Spain) Juan Lizariturry (France) Quentin Halys (Venezuela) Jordi Muñoz Abreu
November 10	Kuwait F1 Futures; Mishref, Kuwait; Hard $10,000	(Spain) Juan Lizariturry (Netherlands) Mark Vervoort; 6–4, 7–6^{(7–4)}	(France) Quentin Halys (France) Calvin Hemery	(Spain) Roberto Ortega Olmedo (Slovakia) Ivo Klec	(Germany) Daniel Masur (Spain) Juan Lizariturry (France) Quentin Halys (Venezuela) Jordi Muñoz Abreu
November 10	Morocco F5 Futures; Casablanca, Morocco; Clay $10,000	(Spain) Oriol Roca Batalla; 6–3, 6–3	(Portugal) Leonardo Tavares	(France) Maxime Tabatruong (Czech Republic) Václav Šafránek	(Austria) David Pamminger (Spain) Ricardo Ojeda Lara (Morocco) Younès Rachidi (Morocco) Lamine Ouahab
November 10	Morocco F5 Futures; Casablanca, Morocco; Clay $10,000	(Spain) Oriol Roca Batalla (Germany) Jean-Marc Werner; 6–3, 3–6, [10–4]	(Morocco) Lamine Ouahab (Morocco) Mohamed Saber	(France) Maxime Tabatruong (Czech Republic) Václav Šafránek	(Austria) David Pamminger (Spain) Ricardo Ojeda Lara (Morocco) Younès Rachidi (Morocco) Lamine Ouahab
November 10	Tunisia F7 Futures; Sousse, Tunisia; Hard $10,000	(Belgium) Julien Cagnina; 1–6, 6–2, 6–4	(Spain) David Pérez Sanz	(Belgium) Germain Gigounon (France) Antoine Escoffier	(Netherlands) Alban Meuffels (Czech Republic) Marek Jaloviec (Italy) Omar Giacalone (France) Grégoire Barrère
November 10	Tunisia F7 Futures; Sousse, Tunisia; Hard $10,000	(Netherlands) Romano Frantzen (Netherlands) Alban Meuffels; 3–6, 6–3, [10–6]	(Spain) David Pérez Sanz (Spain) Javier Pulgar García	(Belgium) Germain Gigounon (France) Antoine Escoffier	(Netherlands) Alban Meuffels (Czech Republic) Marek Jaloviec (Italy) Omar Giacalone (France) Grégoire Barrère
November 10	Turkey F40 Futures; Antalya, Turkey; Clay $10,000	(Slovenia) Janez Semrajc; 6–3, 7–5	(Germany) Kevin Krawietz	(Germany) Maximilian Marterer (Georgia (country)) Aleksandre Metreveli	(Kazakhstan) Dmitry Popko (Uzbekistan) Sanjar Fayziev (Ukraine) Vladyslav Manafov (Romania) Vasile Antonescu
November 10	Turkey F40 Futures; Antalya, Turkey; Clay $10,000	(Germany) Kevin Krawietz (Germany) Maximilian Marterer; 6–3, 6–2	(Slovenia) Janez Semrajc (Austria) Tristan-Samuel Weissborn	(Germany) Maximilian Marterer (Georgia (country)) Aleksandre Metreveli	(Kazakhstan) Dmitry Popko (Uzbekistan) Sanjar Fayziev (Ukraine) Vladyslav Manafov (Romania) Vasile Antonescu
November 10	USA F31 Futures; Niceville, United States; Clay $10,000	(United States) Wil Spencer; 6–4, 2–6, 6–4	(Hungary) Péter Nagy	(United States) Tommy Paul (United States) Jean-Yves Aubone	(United States) Cătălin-Ionuț Gârd (United States) Ty Trombetta (Japan) Sora Fukuda (United States) Reilly Opelka
November 10	USA F31 Futures; Niceville, United States; Clay $10,000	(United States) Jean-Yves Aubone (Zimbabwe) Benjamin Lock; 6–1, 6–2	(Cuba) Randy Blanco (China) Tao Junnan	(United States) Tommy Paul (United States) Jean-Yves Aubone	(United States) Cătălin-Ionuț Gârd (United States) Ty Trombetta (Japan) Sora Fukuda (United States) Reilly Opelka
November 17	Australia F10 Futures; Wollongong, Australia; Hard $15,000	(United States) Jarmere Jenkins; 6–4, 7–5	(New Zealand) José Statham	(Australia) Maverick Banes (Australia) Dane Propoggia	(Australia) Mitchell Williams Robins (United States) Mitchell Krueger (Australia) Gavin van Peperzeel (China) Bai Yan
November 17	Australia F10 Futures; Wollongong, Australia; Hard $15,000	(Australia) Maverick Banes (Australia) Gavin van Peperzeel; 6–2, 6–2	(Australia) Luke Immanuel Harvey (Australia) Mitchell Williams Robins	(Australia) Maverick Banes (Australia) Dane Propoggia	(Australia) Mitchell Williams Robins (United States) Mitchell Krueger (Australia) Gavin van Peperzeel (China) Bai Yan
November 17	Colombia F8 Futures; Popayán, Colombia; Hard $15,000	(Colombia) Eduardo Struvay; 6–4, 7–5	(Bolivia) Federico Zeballos	(Argentina) Facundo Mena (Spain) Jaume Pla Malfeito	(Colombia) Nicolás Barrientos (Colombia) Felipe Escobar (Argentina) Mateo Nicolás Martínez (Colombia) Felipe Mantilla
November 17	Colombia F8 Futures; Popayán, Colombia; Hard $15,000	(Colombia) Nicolás Barrientos (Colombia) Eduardo Struvay; 6–1, 3–6, [10–3]	(Colombia) Felipe Mantilla (Bolivia) Federico Zeballos	(Argentina) Facundo Mena (Spain) Jaume Pla Malfeito	(Colombia) Nicolás Barrientos (Colombia) Felipe Escobar (Argentina) Mateo Nicolás Martínez (Colombia) Felipe Mantilla
November 17	Mexico F13 Futures; Mazatlán, Mexico; Hard $15,000	(United States) Daniel Nguyen; 6–0, 2–6, 7–6^{(7–0)}	(United States) Marcos Giron	(Barbados) Darian King (Mexico) Tigre Hank	(United States) Andre Dome (Guatemala) Christopher Díaz Figueroa (South Africa) Fritz Wolmarans (United States) Oscar Fabian Matthews
November 17	Mexico F13 Futures; Mazatlán, Mexico; Hard $15,000	(Guatemala) Christopher Díaz Figueroa (Mexico) Luis Patiño; 7–5, 6–3	(United States) Andre Dome (United States) Oscar Fabian Matthews	(Barbados) Darian King (Mexico) Tigre Hank	(United States) Andre Dome (Guatemala) Christopher Díaz Figueroa (South Africa) Fritz Wolmarans (United States) Oscar Fabian Matthews
November 17	Cambodia F1 Futures; Phnom Penh, Cambodia; Hard $10,000	(South Korea) Lim Yong-kyu; 4–6, 6–3, 6–2	(India) Karunuday Singh	(France) Johan Sébastien Tatlot (South Korea) Dylan Seong-kwan Kim	(China) Ouyang Bowen (South Korea) Kim Young-seok (South Korea) Song Min-kyu (Russia) Alexander Igoshin
November 17	Cambodia F1 Futures; Phnom Penh, Cambodia; Hard $10,000	(Philippines) Jeson Patrombon (Indonesia) David Agung Susanto; 5–7, 6–3, [10–7]	(Cambodia) Bun Kenny (Canada) Kelsey Stevenson	(France) Johan Sébastien Tatlot (South Korea) Dylan Seong-kwan Kim	(China) Ouyang Bowen (South Korea) Kim Young-seok (South Korea) Song Min-kyu (Russia) Alexander Igoshin
November 17	Chile F7 Futures; Concepción, Chile; Clay $10,000	(Chile) Matías Sborowitz; 3–6, 7–5, 6–4	(Argentina) Franco Agamenone	(Argentina) Nicolás Alejandro de Gregorio (Chile) Benjamín Ugarte	(Argentina) Gonzalo Villanueva (Argentina) Dante Gennaro (Chile) Victor Núñez (Argentina) Leandro Portmann
November 17	Chile F7 Futures; Concepción, Chile; Clay $10,000	(Chile) Cristóbal Saavedra Corvalán (Chile) Ricardo Urzúa-Rivera; 6–3, 6–3	(Argentina) Julián Busch (Argentina) Gustavo Vellbach	(Argentina) Nicolás Alejandro de Gregorio (Chile) Benjamín Ugarte	(Argentina) Gonzalo Villanueva (Argentina) Dante Gennaro (Chile) Victor Núñez (Argentina) Leandro Portmann
November 17	Cyprus F2 Futures; Larnaca, Cyprus; Hard $10,000	(France) Laurent Lokoli; 6–4, 6–0	(Cyprus) Petros Chrysochos	(Slovakia) Adrian Sikora (Serbia) Laslo Djere	(Italy) Erik Crepaldi (Romania) Dragoș Dima (Germany) Tobias Simon (United Kingdom) Richard Gabb
November 17	Cyprus F2 Futures; Larnaca, Cyprus; Hard $10,000	(United Kingdom) Scott Clayton (United Kingdom) Richard Gabb; 7–5, 6–1	(Italy) Marco Bortolotti (Italy) Erik Crepaldi	(Slovakia) Adrian Sikora (Serbia) Laslo Djere	(Italy) Erik Crepaldi (Romania) Dragoș Dima (Germany) Tobias Simon (United Kingdom) Richard Gabb
November 17	Egypt F33 Futures; Sharm El Sheikh, Egypt; Hard $10,000	(Egypt) Mohamed Safwat; 6–4, 6–4	(France) Tom Jomby	(Italy) Riccardo Bonadio (Czech Republic) Libor Salaba	(Austria) Pascal Brunner (Austria) Bastian Trinker (Czech Republic) Jan Šátral (Poland) Paweł Ciaś
November 17	Egypt F33 Futures; Sharm El Sheikh, Egypt; Hard $10,000	(Egypt) Sherif Sabry (Egypt) Mohamed Safwat; 6–3, 6–1	(Czech Republic) Jan Blecha (Austria) Pascal Brunner	(Italy) Riccardo Bonadio (Czech Republic) Libor Salaba	(Austria) Pascal Brunner (Austria) Bastian Trinker (Czech Republic) Jan Šátral (Poland) Paweł Ciaś
November 17	Kuwait F2 Futures; Mishref, Kuwait; Hard $10,000	(Germany) Daniel Masur; 7–6^{(7–5)}, 7–5	(Spain) Roberto Ortega Olmedo	(Spain) Jaime Pulgar-García (Slovakia) Ivo Klec	(United Kingdom) Daniel Smethurst (Belgium) Alexandre Folie (Spain) Juan Lizariturry (France) Calvin Hemery
November 17	Kuwait F2 Futures; Mishref, Kuwait; Hard $10,000	(Belgium) Michael Geerts (Germany) Daniel Masur; 6–4, 7–6^{(7–4)}	(Japan) Junn Mitsuhashi (Japan) Ren Nakamura	(Spain) Jaime Pulgar-García (Slovakia) Ivo Klec	(United Kingdom) Daniel Smethurst (Belgium) Alexandre Folie (Spain) Juan Lizariturry (France) Calvin Hemery
November 17	Morocco F6 Futures; Casablanca, Morocco; Clay $10,000	(France) Maxime Tabatruong; 6–4, 6–1	(Germany) Jean-Marc Werner	(Spain) Marc Giner (Hungary) Gábor Borsos	(Spain) Marcos Giraldi Requena (Spain) Carlos Boluda-Purkiss (Morocco) Yassine Idmbarek (Portugal) Vasco Mensurado
November 17	Morocco F6 Futures; Casablanca, Morocco; Clay $10,000	(Morocco) Lamine Ouahab (Morocco) Mohamed Saber; 7–5, 4–6, [12–10]	(Poland) Piotr Barański (Poland) Bartosz Wojnar	(Spain) Marc Giner (Hungary) Gábor Borsos	(Spain) Marcos Giraldi Requena (Spain) Carlos Boluda-Purkiss (Morocco) Yassine Idmbarek (Portugal) Vasco Mensurado
November 17	Tunisia F8 Futures; Sousse, Tunisia; Hard $10,000	(France) Yannick Jankovits; 6–2, 6–2	(France) Antoine Escoffier	(Spain) David Pérez Sanz (United Kingdom) Andrew Bettles	(Spain) Bernabé Zapata Miralles (Portugal) João Domingues (Russia) Bogdan Bobrov (Switzerland) Loïc Perret
November 17	Tunisia F8 Futures; Sousse, Tunisia; Hard $10,000	(Portugal) João Domingues (Portugal) André Gaspar Murta; 7–5, 6–3	(Spain) Samuel Ribeiro Navarrete (Spain) Pablo Vivero González	(Spain) David Pérez Sanz (United Kingdom) Andrew Bettles	(Spain) Bernabé Zapata Miralles (Portugal) João Domingues (Russia) Bogdan Bobrov (Switzerland) Loïc Perret
November 17	Turkey F41 Futures; Antalya, Turkey; Hard $10,000	(Slovenia) Janez Semrajc; 6–3, 3–6, 6–4	(Venezuela) Ricardo Rodríguez	(Germany) Jan Choinski (Austria) Tristan-Samuel Weissborn	(Switzerland) Antoine Bellier (Turkey) Altuğ Çelikbilek (Turkey) Cem İlkel (Belgium) Christopher Heyman
November 17	Turkey F41 Futures; Antalya, Turkey; Hard $10,000	(Slovenia) Janez Semrajc (Austria) Tristan-Samuel Weissborn; 6–3, 6–3	(Germany) Matthias Wunner (Germany) Lennart Zynga	(Germany) Jan Choinski (Austria) Tristan-Samuel Weissborn	(Switzerland) Antoine Bellier (Turkey) Altuğ Çelikbilek (Turkey) Cem İlkel (Belgium) Christopher Heyman
November 17	USA F32 Futures; Pensacola, United States; Clay $10,000	(France) Théo Fournerie; 6–2, 7–5	(New Zealand) Ben McLachlan	(United States) Michael Shabaz (United States) Justin Shane	(United States) Tommy Paul (Switzerland) Vullnet Tashi (Mexico) Daniel Garza (United States) Patrick Daciek
November 17	USA F32 Futures; Pensacola, United States; Clay $10,000	(New Zealand) Ben McLachlan (United States) Justin Shane; 7–6^{(7–2)}, 6–2	(United Kingdom) Julien Cash (France) Florian Lakat	(United States) Michael Shabaz (United States) Justin Shane	(United States) Tommy Paul (Switzerland) Vullnet Tashi (Mexico) Daniel Garza (United States) Patrick Daciek
November 24	Brazil F15 Futures; Foz do Iguaçu, Brazil; Clay $10,000	(Brazil) Fabrício Neis; 6–3, 7–5	(Brazil) Rafael Matos	(Brazil) Felipe Brandão (Argentina) Nicolás Kicker	(Argentina) Matías Rodolfo Buchhass (Brazil) Leonardo Civita-Telles (Brazil) Marcos Vinicius da Silva Dias (Spain) Mario Vilella Martínez
November 24	Brazil F15 Futures; Foz do Iguaçu, Brazil; Clay $10,000	(Brazil) Fabrício Neis (Brazil) Fernando Romboli; 7–6^{(7–3)}, 6–3	(Argentina) Matías Rodolfo Buchhass (Argentina) Tomás Iriarte	(Brazil) Felipe Brandão (Argentina) Nicolás Kicker	(Argentina) Matías Rodolfo Buchhass (Brazil) Leonardo Civita-Telles (Brazil) Marcos Vinicius da Silva Dias (Spain) Mario Vilella Martínez
November 24	Dominican Republic F1 Futures; La Romana, Dominican Republic; Clay $15,000	(Netherlands) Antal van der Duim; 6–7^{(2–7)}, 7–6^{(7–5)}, 6–1	(United States) Connor Smith	(Argentina) Juan Ignacio Galarza (Brazil) Thiago Monteiro	(Colombia) Felipe Escobar (Peru) Mauricio Echazú (Peru) Duilio Beretta (Brazil) Fabiano de Paula
November 24	Dominican Republic F1 Futures; La Romana, Dominican Republic; Clay $15,000	(Brazil) Pedro Bernardi (United States) Connor Smith; 7–6^{(7–5)}, 6–4	(Bulgaria) Alexandar Lazov (Finland) Henrik Sillanpää	(Argentina) Juan Ignacio Galarza (Brazil) Thiago Monteiro	(Colombia) Felipe Escobar (Peru) Mauricio Echazú (Peru) Duilio Beretta (Brazil) Fabiano de Paula
November 24	Thailand F10 Futures; Bangkok, Thailand; Hard $15,000	(Thailand) Danai Udomchoke; 6–3, 6–4	(United States) Jason Jung	(United Kingdom) Brydan Klein (Japan) Yasutaka Uchiyama	(China) Bai Yan (Thailand) Pruchya Isaro (Thailand) Warit Sornbutnark (Australia) Jacob Grills
November 24	Thailand F10 Futures; Bangkok, Thailand; Hard $15,000	(Thailand) Pruchya Isaro (Thailand) Nuttanon Kadchapanan; 6–2, 6–1	(Australia) Jacob Grills (Japan) Kaichi Uchida	(United Kingdom) Brydan Klein (Japan) Yasutaka Uchiyama	(China) Bai Yan (Thailand) Pruchya Isaro (Thailand) Warit Sornbutnark (Australia) Jacob Grills
November 24	Cambodia F2 Futures; Phnom Penh, Cambodia; Hard $10,000	(South Korea) Lee Duck-hee; 7–6^{(7–3)}, 6–4	(Israel) Dekel Bar	(France) Johan Sébastien Tatlot (Germany) Robin Kern	(Chinese Taipei) Yang Tsung-hua (South Korea) Dylan Seong-kwan Kim (India) Karunuday Singh (Chinese Taipei) Huang Liang-chi
November 24	Cambodia F2 Futures; Phnom Penh, Cambodia; Hard $10,000	(Germany) Robin Kern (Germany) Sebastian Wagner; 3–6, 6–3, [10–5]	(China) Gao Xin (China) Ouyang Bowen	(France) Johan Sébastien Tatlot (Germany) Robin Kern	(Chinese Taipei) Yang Tsung-hua (South Korea) Dylan Seong-kwan Kim (India) Karunuday Singh (Chinese Taipei) Huang Liang-chi
November 24	Chile F8 Futures; Temuco, Chile; Clay $10,000	(Chile) Guillermo Rivera Aránguiz; 6–7^{(5–7)}, 7–6^{(7–4)}, 4–1, ret.	(Chile) Jorge Aguilar	(Chile) Juan Carlos Sáez (Argentina) Juan Pablo Paz	(Chile) Hans Podlipnik Castillo (Chile) Cristóbal Saavedra Corvalán (Argentina) Nicolás Alberto Arreche (Chile) Bastián Malla
November 24	Chile F8 Futures; Temuco, Chile; Clay $10,000	(Argentina) Juan Pablo Paz (Argentina) Leandro Portmann; 7–5, 6–3	(Argentina) Eduardo Agustín Torre (Argentina) Gonzalo Villanueva	(Chile) Juan Carlos Sáez (Argentina) Juan Pablo Paz	(Chile) Hans Podlipnik Castillo (Chile) Cristóbal Saavedra Corvalán (Argentina) Nicolás Alberto Arreche (Chile) Bastián Malla
November 24	Cyprus F3 Futures; Larnaca, Cyprus; Hard $10,000	(Cyprus) Petros Chrysochos; 3–6, 7–6^{(10–8)}, 6–0	(Italy) Erik Crepaldi	(Belgium) Julien Dubail (United Kingdom) Richard Gabb	(Republic of Ireland) Sam Barry (Italy) Marco Bortolotti (China) Zhang Zhizhen (Germany) Tobias Simon
November 24	Cyprus F3 Futures; Larnaca, Cyprus; Hard $10,000	(Republic of Ireland) Sam Barry (Republic of Ireland) David O'Hare; 6–1, 6–2	(Italy) Marco Bortolotti (Italy) Erik Crepaldi	(Belgium) Julien Dubail (United Kingdom) Richard Gabb	(Republic of Ireland) Sam Barry (Italy) Marco Bortolotti (China) Zhang Zhizhen (Germany) Tobias Simon
November 24	Egypt F34 Futures; Sharm El Sheikh, Egypt; Hard $10,000	(Egypt) Mohamed Safwat; 5–7, 6–3, 6–2	(Czech Republic) Jaroslav Pospíšil	(France) Tom Jomby (Belgium) Julien Cagnina	(Czech Republic) Jan Šátral (Austria) Bastian Trinker (France) Grégoire Barrère (Egypt) Sherif Sabry
November 24	Egypt F34 Futures; Sharm El Sheikh, Egypt; Hard $10,000	(Czech Republic) Libor Salaba (Czech Republic) Jan Šátral; 6–4, 6–4	(Czech Republic) Dominik Kellovský (Czech Republic) Jaroslav Pospíšil	(France) Tom Jomby (Belgium) Julien Cagnina	(Czech Republic) Jan Šátral (Austria) Bastian Trinker (France) Grégoire Barrère (Egypt) Sherif Sabry
November 24	Iran F11 Futures; Kish, Iran; Clay $10,000	(Spain) Marc Fornell; 6–1, 6–1	(Croatia) Toni Androić	(Poland) Arkadiusz Kocyła (France) Alexis Musialek	(Portugal) Vasco Mensurado (Germany) Jonas Lütjen (Spain) Juan Lizariturry (Croatia) Duje Kekez
November 24	Iran F11 Futures; Kish, Iran; Clay $10,000	(Spain) Marc Fornell (Spain) Marco Neubau; 6–4, 6–4	(North Macedonia) Tomislav Jotovski (Croatia) Duje Kekez	(Poland) Arkadiusz Kocyła (France) Alexis Musialek	(Portugal) Vasco Mensurado (Germany) Jonas Lütjen (Spain) Juan Lizariturry (Croatia) Duje Kekez
November 24	Kuwait F3 Futures; Mishref, Kuwait; Hard $10,000	(Austria) Christian Trubrig; 7–6^{(7–4)}, 6–3	(Spain) Jaime Pulgar-García	(Spain) Roberto Ortega Olmedo (Switzerland) Adrien Bossel	(Austria) Maximilian Neuchrist (Belgium) Joris De Loore (France) Calvin Hemery (United Kingdom) Daniel Smethurst
November 24	Kuwait F3 Futures; Mishref, Kuwait; Hard $10,000	(France) Calvin Hemery (Belgium) Jeroen Vanneste; 6–1, 6–3	(Austria) Maximilian Neuchrist (Austria) Dominik Wirlend	(Spain) Roberto Ortega Olmedo (Switzerland) Adrien Bossel	(Austria) Maximilian Neuchrist (Belgium) Joris De Loore (France) Calvin Hemery (United Kingdom) Daniel Smethurst
November 24	Tunisia F9 Futures; Sousse, Tunisia; Hard $10,000	(France) Yannick Jankovits; 6–1, 6–2	(Italy) Omar Giacalone	(Germany) Lukas Rüpke (Portugal) João Domingues	(Serbia) Nikola Milojević (Italy) Nicola Ghedin (United Kingdom) Evan Hoyt (Spain) David Pérez Sanz
November 24	Tunisia F9 Futures; Sousse, Tunisia; Hard $10,000	(Venezuela) Jordi Muñoz Abreu (Spain) David Pérez Sanz; 6–4, 6–2	(South Africa) Damon Gooch (United Kingdom) James Marsalek	(Germany) Lukas Rüpke (Portugal) João Domingues	(Serbia) Nikola Milojević (Italy) Nicola Ghedin (United Kingdom) Evan Hoyt (Spain) David Pérez Sanz
November 24	Turkey F42 Futures; Antalya, Turkey; Hard $10,000	(Russia) Roman Safiullin; 7–6^{(9–7)}, 6–3	(Ukraine) Denys Mylokostov	(Russia) Kirill Dmitriev (Portugal) Frederico Ferreira Silva	(Lithuania) Lukas Mugevičius (Kazakhstan) Dmitry Popko (South Africa) Tucker Vorster (Germany) Paul Wörner
November 24	Turkey F42 Futures; Antalya, Turkey; Hard $10,000	(Austria) Lucas Miedler (Austria) Tristan-Samuel Weissborn; 7–5, 6–1	(Switzerland) Antoine Bellier (Switzerland) Adrian Bodmer	(Russia) Kirill Dmitriev (Portugal) Frederico Ferreira Silva	(Lithuania) Lukas Mugevičius (Kazakhstan) Dmitry Popko (South Africa) Tucker Vorster (Germany) Paul Wörner

=== December ===
Week of	Tournament	Winner	Runners-up	Semifinalists	Quarterfinalists
December 1	Argentina F19 Futures; Mendoza, Argentina; Clay $15,000	(Poland) Grzegorz Panfil; 7–5, 6–4	(Argentina) Guillermo Durán	(Argentina) Federico Coria (Italy) Gianluigi Quinzi	(Argentina) Hernán Casanova (Poland) Kamil Majchrzak (Argentina) Francisco Bahamonde (Argentina) Andrés Molteni
December 1	Argentina F19 Futures; Mendoza, Argentina; Clay $15,000	(Argentina) Guillermo Durán (Argentina) Mateo Nicolás Martínez; 6–3, 6–4	(Argentina) Patricio Heras (Argentina) Nicolás Kicker	(Argentina) Federico Coria (Italy) Gianluigi Quinzi	(Argentina) Hernán Casanova (Poland) Kamil Majchrzak (Argentina) Francisco Bahamonde (Argentina) Andrés Molteni
December 1	Brazil F16 Futures; São José dos Campos, Brazil; Clay $15,000	(Brazil) Fernando Romboli; 4–6, 6–1, 6–2	(Brazil) Tiago Lopes	(Brazil) Caio Silva (Brazil) Ricardo Hocevar	(Spain) Mario Vilella Martínez (Brazil) Alexandre Tsuchiya (Brazil) Daniel Dutra da Silva (Brazil) Fabrício Neis
December 1	Brazil F16 Futures; São José dos Campos, Brazil; Clay $15,000	(Brazil) Fabrício Neis (Brazil) Caio Silva; 6–1, 7–5	(Brazil) Ricardo Hocevar (Brazil) Tiago Lopes	(Brazil) Caio Silva (Brazil) Ricardo Hocevar	(Spain) Mario Vilella Martínez (Brazil) Alexandre Tsuchiya (Brazil) Daniel Dutra da Silva (Brazil) Fabrício Neis
December 1	Dominican Republic F2 Futures; Santiago de los Caballeros, Dominican Republic; Clay $15,000	(Brazil) Fabiano de Paula; 6–2, 6–2	(Spain) Albert Alcaraz Ivorra	(Bolivia) Hugo Dellien (Brazil) Thiago Monteiro	(Bulgaria) Alexandar Lazov (United States) Connor Smith (France) Corentin Moutet (Austria) Michael Linzer
December 1	Dominican Republic F2 Futures; Santiago de los Caballeros, Dominican Republic; Clay $15,000	(Peru) Duilio Beretta (Bolivia) Hugo Dellien; 3–6, 6–4, [10–8]	(Brazil) Fabiano de Paula (Brazil) Thiago Monteiro	(Bolivia) Hugo Dellien (Brazil) Thiago Monteiro	(Bulgaria) Alexandar Lazov (United States) Connor Smith (France) Corentin Moutet (Austria) Michael Linzer
December 1	Mexico F14 Futures; Mérida, Mexico; Hard $15,000	(United States) Dennis Novikov; 6–3, 6–7^{(7–9)}, 7–6^{(7–3)}	(Ecuador) Giovanni Lapentti	(Canada) Philip Bester (United States) Eric Quigley	(Italy) Claudio Grassi (Czech Republic) Marek Michalička (Colombia) Nicolás Barrientos (United Kingdom) Farris Fathi Gosea
December 1	Mexico F14 Futures; Mérida, Mexico; Hard $15,000	(El Salvador) Marcelo Arévalo (Italy) Claudio Grassi; 6–2, 6–4	(United States) Dennis Novikov (United States) Clay Thompson	(Canada) Philip Bester (United States) Eric Quigley	(Italy) Claudio Grassi (Czech Republic) Marek Michalička (Colombia) Nicolás Barrientos (United Kingdom) Farris Fathi Gosea
December 1	Thailand F11 Futures; Bangkok, Thailand; Hard $15,000	(Thailand) Danai Udomchoke; 6–0, 3–6, 6–3	(Australia) Benjamin Mitchell	(Australia) Jacob Grills (France) Johan Sébastien Tatlot	(Japan) Yasutaka Uchiyama (United States) Jason Jung (China) Wang Chuhan (Thailand) Phassawit Burapharitta
December 1	Thailand F11 Futures; Bangkok, Thailand; Hard $15,000	(United Kingdom) Brydan Klein (United Kingdom) David Rice; 3–6, 7–6^{(7–1)}, [10–8]	(Thailand) Pruchya Isaro (Thailand) Nuttanon Kadchapanan	(Australia) Jacob Grills (France) Johan Sébastien Tatlot	(Japan) Yasutaka Uchiyama (United States) Jason Jung (China) Wang Chuhan (Thailand) Phassawit Burapharitta
December 1	Cambodia F3 Futures; Phnom Penh, Cambodia; Hard $10,000	(Chinese Taipei) Huang Liang-chi; 7–5, 6–4	(Japan) Toshihide Matsui	(Chinese Taipei) Yi Chu-huan (Japan) Yūichi Ito	(Indonesia) Christopher Rungkat (South Korea) Nam Hyun-woo (Russia) Alexander Igoshin (China) Gao Xin
December 1	Cambodia F3 Futures; Phnom Penh, Cambodia; Hard $10,000	(Chinese Taipei) Huang Liang-chi (China) Ouyang Bowen; 6–4, 6–3	(South Korea) Chung Hong (South Korea) Lee Jea-moon	(Chinese Taipei) Yi Chu-huan (Japan) Yūichi Ito	(Indonesia) Christopher Rungkat (South Korea) Nam Hyun-woo (Russia) Alexander Igoshin (China) Gao Xin
December 1	Chile F9 Futures; Osorno, Chile; Clay (indoor) $10,000	(Chile) Hans Podlipnik Castillo; 6–2, 6–3	(Chile) Julio Peralta	(Uruguay) Martín Cuevas (Chile) Cristóbal Saavedra Corvalán	(Argentina) Mariano Kestelboim (Argentina) Nicolás Alejandro de Gregorio (Argentina) Nicolás Alberto Arreche (Japan) Ryūsei Makiguchi
December 1	Chile F9 Futures; Osorno, Chile; Clay (indoor) $10,000	(Chile) Hans Podlipnik Castillo (Chile) Cristóbal Saavedra Corvalán; 7–6^{(9–7)}, 2–6, [10–8]	(Uruguay) Martín Cuevas (Uruguay) Rodrigo Senattore	(Uruguay) Martín Cuevas (Chile) Cristóbal Saavedra Corvalán	(Argentina) Mariano Kestelboim (Argentina) Nicolás Alejandro de Gregorio (Argentina) Nicolás Alberto Arreche (Japan) Ryūsei Makiguchi
December 1	Egypt F35 Futures; Sharm El Sheikh, Egypt; Hard $10,000	(Slovenia) Janez Semrajc; 6–1, 6–1	(Austria) Pascal Brunner	(Belgium) Germain Gigounon (Slovenia) Tom Kočevar-Dešman	(Poland) Phillip Gresk (Russia) Ivan Nedelko (Poland) Paweł Ciaś (Ukraine) Volodymyr Uzhylovskyi
December 1	Egypt F35 Futures; Sharm El Sheikh, Egypt; Hard $10,000	(Belgium) Germain Gigounon (Belgium) Sander Gillé; 1–6, 6–1, [10–8]	(Austria) Pascal Brunner (Slovenia) Janez Semrajc	(Belgium) Germain Gigounon (Slovenia) Tom Kočevar-Dešman	(Poland) Phillip Gresk (Russia) Ivan Nedelko (Poland) Paweł Ciaś (Ukraine) Volodymyr Uzhylovskyi
December 1	Iran F12 Futures; Kish, Iran; Clay $10,000	(France) Mathias Bourgue; 6–4, 3–6, 6–1	(Croatia) Toni Androić	(France) Alexis Musialek (Romania) Luca George Tatomir	(Romania) Vasile Antonescu (Portugal) Vasco Mensurado (Italy) Luca Pancaldi (North Macedonia) Tomislav Jotovski
December 1	Iran F12 Futures; Kish, Iran; Clay $10,000	(Spain) Marc Fornell (Spain) Marco Neubau; 6–3, 6–1	(Austria) Markus Sedletzky (Austria) Dominic Weidinger	(France) Alexis Musialek (Romania) Luca George Tatomir	(Romania) Vasile Antonescu (Portugal) Vasco Mensurado (Italy) Luca Pancaldi (North Macedonia) Tomislav Jotovski
December 1	Qatar F4 Futures; Doha, Qatar; Hard $10,000	(United Kingdom) Daniel Cox; 6–4, 6–0	(Switzerland) Adrien Bossel	(Belgium) Joris De Loore (Russia) Victor Baluda	(Belgium) Michael Geerts (Russia) Evgeny Karlovskiy (Netherlands) Sander Arends (United Kingdom) Daniel Smethurst
December 1	Qatar F4 Futures; Doha, Qatar; Hard $10,000	(United Kingdom) Scott Clayton (United Kingdom) Richard Gabb; 6–4, 6–7^{(5–7)}, [10–6]	(Republic of Ireland) Sam Barry (Austria) Maximilian Neuchrist	(Belgium) Joris De Loore (Russia) Victor Baluda	(Belgium) Michael Geerts (Russia) Evgeny Karlovskiy (Netherlands) Sander Arends (United Kingdom) Daniel Smethurst
December 1	Tunisia F10 Futures; Sousse, Tunisia; Hard $10,000	(Italy) Omar Giacalone; 7–5, 6–4	(Italy) Alessandro Bega	(United Kingdom) Joshua Ward-Hibbert (Japan) Hiroyasu Ehara	(Portugal) João Domingues (Italy) Nicola Ghedin (United Kingdom) Andrew Bettles (Spain) David Pérez Sanz
December 1	Tunisia F10 Futures; Sousse, Tunisia; Hard $10,000	(Italy) Alessandro Bega (Italy) Francesco Vilardo; 7–6^{(7–2)}, 6–3	(United Kingdom) Andrew Bettles (United Kingdom) Evan Hoyt	(United Kingdom) Joshua Ward-Hibbert (Japan) Hiroyasu Ehara	(Portugal) João Domingues (Italy) Nicola Ghedin (United Kingdom) Andrew Bettles (Spain) David Pérez Sanz
December 1	Turkey F43 Futures; Antalya, Turkey; Hard $10,000	(Russia) Roman Safiullin; 6–1, 1–2 ret.	(Portugal) Frederico Ferreira Silva	(Bosnia and Herzegovina) Mirza Bašić (Kazakhstan) Dmitry Popko	(Portugal) Romain Barbosa (South Africa) Tucker Vorster (Italy) Lorenzo Giustino (Latvia) Mārtiņš Podžus
December 1	Turkey F43 Futures; Antalya, Turkey; Hard $10,000	(Latvia) Jānis Podžus (Latvia) Mārtiņš Podžus; 4–6, 6–3, [10–7]	(Portugal) Romain Barbosa (Portugal) Frederico Ferreira Silva	(Bosnia and Herzegovina) Mirza Bašić (Kazakhstan) Dmitry Popko	(Portugal) Romain Barbosa (South Africa) Tucker Vorster (Italy) Lorenzo Giustino (Latvia) Mārtiņš Podžus
December 8	Argentina F20 Futures; Mendoza, Argentina; Clay $15,000	(Chile) Cristian Garín; 6–4, 5–7, 6–2	(Poland) Grzegorz Panfil	(Argentina) Martín Alund (Argentina) Andrés Molteni	(Chile) Jorge Aguilar (Brazil) João Pedro Sorgi (Argentina) Matías Rodolfo Buchhass (Argentina) Federico Coria
December 8	Argentina F20 Futures; Mendoza, Argentina; Clay $15,000	(Argentina) Mateo Nicolás Martínez (Argentina) Facundo Mena; 7–6^{(7–4)}, 6–4	(Chile) Jorge Aguilar (Chile) Cristian Garín	(Argentina) Martín Alund (Argentina) Andrés Molteni	(Chile) Jorge Aguilar (Brazil) João Pedro Sorgi (Argentina) Matías Rodolfo Buchhass (Argentina) Federico Coria
December 8	Dominican Republic F3 Futures; Santo Domingo, Dominican Republic; Clay $15,000	(Brazil) Fabiano de Paula; 7–6^{(7–4)}, 6–2	(Bolivia) Hugo Dellien	(Brazil) Thiago Monteiro (Dominican Republic) José Hernández	(Ecuador) Emilio Gómez (Spain) Roberto Ortega Olmedo (United States) Sekou Bangoura (Argentina) Juan Ignacio Galarza
December 8	Dominican Republic F3 Futures; Santo Domingo, Dominican Republic; Clay $15,000	(Peru) Duilio Beretta (Bolivia) Hugo Dellien; 6–7^{(9–11)}, 6–4, [10–4]	(Ecuador) Emilio Gómez (Mexico) Manuel Sánchez	(Brazil) Thiago Monteiro (Dominican Republic) José Hernández	(Ecuador) Emilio Gómez (Spain) Roberto Ortega Olmedo (United States) Sekou Bangoura (Argentina) Juan Ignacio Galarza
December 8	Mexico F15 Futures; Mérida, Mexico; Hard $15,000	(United States) Dennis Novikov; 6–4, 6–4	(Canada) Philip Bester	(Ecuador) Giovanni Lapentti (United States) Adam El Mihdawy	(Mexico) Lucas Gómez (United States) Eric Quigley (Mexico) Mauricio Astorga (El Salvador) Marcelo Arévalo
December 8	Mexico F15 Futures; Mérida, Mexico; Hard $15,000	(Canada) Philip Bester (United States) Eric Quigley; 4–6, 7–6^{(7–5)}, [12–10]	(South Africa) Dean O'Brien (Colombia) Juan Carlos Spir	(Ecuador) Giovanni Lapentti (United States) Adam El Mihdawy	(Mexico) Lucas Gómez (United States) Eric Quigley (Mexico) Mauricio Astorga (El Salvador) Marcelo Arévalo
December 8	Senegal F1 Futures; Dakar, Senegal; Hard $15,000	(Belgium) Alexandre Folie; 4–6, 7–5, 6–2	(Zimbabwe) Takanyi Garanganga	(Bosnia and Herzegovina) Aldin Šetkić (France) Grégoire Barrère	(France) Jérôme Inzerillo (Serbia) Miljan Zekić (France) Jordan Ubiergo (South Africa) Keith-Patrick Crowley
December 8	Senegal F1 Futures; Dakar, Senegal; Hard $15,000	(South Africa) Keith-Patrick Crowley (Zimbabwe) Takanyi Garanganga; 6–3, 6–3	(France) Tom Jomby (France) Mick Lescure	(Bosnia and Herzegovina) Aldin Šetkić (France) Grégoire Barrère	(France) Jérôme Inzerillo (Serbia) Miljan Zekić (France) Jordan Ubiergo (South Africa) Keith-Patrick Crowley
December 8	Togo F1 Futures; Lomé, Togo; Hard $15,000	(Belgium) Maxime Authom; 7–5, 6–1	(Spain) Enrique López Pérez	(Slovakia) Ivo Klec (United Kingdom) Joe Salisbury	(Russia) Karen Khachanov (Spain) Aarón Cortés Alcaraz (Colombia) Juan Sebastián Gómez (France) Laurent Rochette
December 8	Togo F1 Futures; Lomé, Togo; Hard $15,000	(Belgium) Maxime Authom (Colombia) Juan Sebastián Gómez; 6–3, 6–3	(Republic of Ireland) David O'Hare (United Kingdom) Joe Salisbury	(Slovakia) Ivo Klec (United Kingdom) Joe Salisbury	(Russia) Karen Khachanov (Spain) Aarón Cortés Alcaraz (Colombia) Juan Sebastián Gómez (France) Laurent Rochette
December 8	Chile F10 Futures; Santiago, Chile; Clay $10,000	(Chile) Hans Podlipnik Castillo; 6–4, 6–4	(Chile) Juan Carlos Sáez	(Argentina) Tomás Lipovšek Puches (Brazil) Ricardo Hocevar	(Chile) Guillermo Rivera Aránguiz (Chile) Bastián Malla (Uruguay) Martín Cuevas (Argentina) Nicolás Alberto Arreche
December 8	Chile F10 Futures; Santiago, Chile; Clay $10,000	(Chile) Julio Peralta (United States) Matt Seeberger; 6–2, 6–3	(Uruguay) Martín Cuevas (Brazil) Gustavo Guerses	(Argentina) Tomás Lipovšek Puches (Brazil) Ricardo Hocevar	(Chile) Guillermo Rivera Aránguiz (Chile) Bastián Malla (Uruguay) Martín Cuevas (Argentina) Nicolás Alberto Arreche
December 8	Egypt F36 Futures; Sharm El Sheikh, Egypt; Hard $10,000	(Slovenia) Tom Kočevar-Dešman; 6–2, 6–1	(Russia) Aleksandr Vasilenko	(Egypt) Mohamed Safwat (Egypt) Sherif Sabry	(Egypt) Mazen Osama (Ukraine) Vitaliy Sachko (Austria) Thomas Statzberger (Slovenia) Janez Semrajc
December 8	Egypt F36 Futures; Sharm El Sheikh, Egypt; Hard $10,000	(Czech Republic) Filip Doležel (Czech Republic) Petr Michnev; 6–3, 4–6, [10–3]	(Egypt) Mazen Osama (Russia) Aleksandr Vasilenko	(Egypt) Mohamed Safwat (Egypt) Sherif Sabry	(Egypt) Mazen Osama (Ukraine) Vitaliy Sachko (Austria) Thomas Statzberger (Slovenia) Janez Semrajc
December 8	Iran F13 Futures; Kish, Iran; Clay $10,000	(France) Alexis Musialek; 4–6, 6–3, 6–0	(Spain) Marc Fornell	(Germany) Leon Schutt (Croatia) Toni Androić	(Germany) Jonas Lütjen (Romania) Vasile Antonescu (North Macedonia) Tomislav Jotovski (Argentina) Matías Franco Descotte
December 8	Iran F13 Futures; Kish, Iran; Clay $10,000	(Germany) Jonas Lütjen (Germany) Timon Reichelt; 1–6, 7–6^{(7–5)}, [11–9]	(Croatia) Toni Androić (Croatia) Duje Kekez	(Germany) Leon Schutt (Croatia) Toni Androić	(Germany) Jonas Lütjen (Romania) Vasile Antonescu (North Macedonia) Tomislav Jotovski (Argentina) Matías Franco Descotte
December 8	Qatar F5 Futures; Doha, Qatar; Hard $10,000	(Georgia (country)) Nikoloz Basilashvili; 7–6^{(7–5)}, 6–2	(India) Ramkumar Ramanathan	(Russia) Victor Baluda (United Kingdom) Richard Gabb	(France) Guillaume Rufin (United Kingdom) Daniel Smethurst (Austria) Maximilian Neuchrist (United Kingdom) Scott Clayton
December 8	Qatar F5 Futures; Doha, Qatar; Hard $10,000	(India) Sriram Balaji (India) Ramkumar Ramanathan; 6–3, 6–4	(Republic of Ireland) Sam Barry (Austria) Maximilian Neuchrist	(Russia) Victor Baluda (United Kingdom) Richard Gabb	(France) Guillaume Rufin (United Kingdom) Daniel Smethurst (Austria) Maximilian Neuchrist (United Kingdom) Scott Clayton
December 8	Tunisia F11 Futures; Sousse, Tunisia; Hard $10,000	(United Kingdom) Joshua Ward-Hibbert; 6–2, 3–6, 6–4	(Japan) Hiroyasu Ehara	(France) Rémi Boutillier (Italy) Nicola Ghedin	(France) Élie Rousset (Serbia) Nikola Milojević (Italy) Omar Giacalone (Switzerland) Loïc Perret
December 8	Tunisia F11 Futures; Sousse, Tunisia; Hard $10,000	Doubles competition not completed due to bad weather.		(France) Rémi Boutillier (Italy) Nicola Ghedin	(France) Élie Rousset (Serbia) Nikola Milojević (Italy) Omar Giacalone (Switzerland) Loïc Perret
December 8	Turkey F44 Futures; Antalya, Turkey; Hard $10,000	(Latvia) Mārtiņš Podžus; 6–2, 6–0	(Italy) Erik Crepaldi	(Ukraine) Denys Mylokostov (Romania) Dragoș Dima	(Serbia) Denis Bejtulahi (Ukraine) Vladyslav Manafov (Latvia) Jānis Podžus (Portugal) Romain Barbosa
December 8	Turkey F44 Futures; Antalya, Turkey; Hard $10,000	(Romania) Bogdan Ionuț Apostol (Lithuania) Lukas Mugevičius; 6–4, 4–6, [13–11]	(Latvia) Jānis Podžus (Latvia) Mārtiņš Podžus	(Ukraine) Denys Mylokostov (Romania) Dragoș Dima	(Serbia) Denis Bejtulahi (Ukraine) Vladyslav Manafov (Latvia) Jānis Podžus (Portugal) Romain Barbosa
December 15	Dominican Republic F4 Futures; Santo Domingo, Dominican Republic; Hard $15,000	(Russia) Andrey Rublev; 6–2, 6–4	(United States) Mitchell Krueger	(United States) Connor Smith (Bulgaria) Alexandar Lazov	(Spain) Albert Alcaraz Ivorra (Mexico) Tigre Hank (Ecuador) Emilio Gómez (Argentina) Juan Ignacio Galarza
December 15	Dominican Republic F4 Futures; Santo Domingo, Dominican Republic; Hard $15,000	(United States) Sekou Bangoura (United States) Mitchell Krueger; 6–7^{(1–7)}, 6–1, [10–8]	(Peru) Mauricio Echazú (Bulgaria) Alexandar Lazov	(United States) Connor Smith (Bulgaria) Alexandar Lazov	(Spain) Albert Alcaraz Ivorra (Mexico) Tigre Hank (Ecuador) Emilio Gómez (Argentina) Juan Ignacio Galarza
December 15	Senegal F2 Futures; Dakar, Senegal; Hard $15,000	(Serbia) Laslo Djere; 7–5, 2–6, 6–4	(Bosnia and Herzegovina) Aldin Šetkić	(France) Mick Lescure (France) Grégoire Barrère	(France) Jérôme Inzerillo (France) Jordan Ubiergo (France) Tom Jomby (Netherlands) Paul Monteban
December 15	Senegal F2 Futures; Dakar, Senegal; Hard $15,000	(Democratic Republic of the Congo) William Bushamuka (France) Tom Jomby; 6–4, 6–4	(South Africa) Keith-Patrick Crowley (Bosnia and Herzegovina) Aldin Šetkić	(France) Mick Lescure (France) Grégoire Barrère	(France) Jérôme Inzerillo (France) Jordan Ubiergo (France) Tom Jomby (Netherlands) Paul Monteban
December 15	Togo F2 Futures; Lomé, Togo; Hard $15,000	(Slovakia) Ivo Klec; 2–6, 7–6^{(7–4)}, 6–2	(Spain) Jaime Pulgar-García	(Spain) Javier Pulgar-García (France) Laurent Rochette	(Spain) Enrique López Pérez (Zimbabwe) Takanyi Garanganga (France) Josselin Ouanna (Colombia) Juan Sebastián Gómez
December 15	Togo F2 Futures; Lomé, Togo; Hard $15,000	(Republic of Ireland) David O'Hare (United Kingdom) Joe Salisbury; 7–6^{(7–5)}, 6–4	(Togo) Komlavi Loglo (France) Josselin Ouanna	(Spain) Javier Pulgar-García (France) Laurent Rochette	(Spain) Enrique López Pérez (Zimbabwe) Takanyi Garanganga (France) Josselin Ouanna (Colombia) Juan Sebastián Gómez
December 15	Chile F11 Futures; Villa Alemana, Chile; Clay $10,000	(Chile) Bastián Malla; 4–6, 6–1, 6–2	(Argentina) Tomás Lipovšek Puches	(Chile) Jorge Montero (Austria) Michael Linzer	(Chile) Juan Carlos Sáez (Chile) Guillermo Rivera Aránguiz (Argentina) Valentín Florez (Argentina) Juan Pablo Paz
December 15	Chile F11 Futures; Villa Alemana, Chile; Clay $10,000	(Chile) Julio Peralta (Chile) Ricardo Urzúa-Rivera; 7–5, 6–0	(Argentina) Nicolás Alberto Arreche (Argentina) Tomás Lipovšek Puches	(Chile) Jorge Montero (Austria) Michael Linzer	(Chile) Juan Carlos Sáez (Chile) Guillermo Rivera Aránguiz (Argentina) Valentín Florez (Argentina) Juan Pablo Paz
December 15	Qatar F6 Futures; Doha, Qatar; Hard $10,000	(Georgia (country)) Nikoloz Basilashvili; 6–1, 6–2	(United Kingdom) James Marsalek	(Austria) Maximilian Neuchrist (France) Guillaume Rufin	(Belgium) Joris De Loore (India) Sumit Nagal (Netherlands) Niels Lootsma (India) Ramkumar Ramanathan
December 15	Qatar F6 Futures; Doha, Qatar; Hard $10,000	(Poland) Adam Chadaj (Poland) Adam Majchrowicz; 7–6^{(7–4)}, 4–6, [10–4]	(Netherlands) Sander Arends (United Kingdom) Richard Gabb	(Austria) Maximilian Neuchrist (France) Guillaume Rufin	(Belgium) Joris De Loore (India) Sumit Nagal (Netherlands) Niels Lootsma (India) Ramkumar Ramanathan
December 15	Turkey F45 Futures; Antalya, Turkey; Hard $10,000	(France) Rémi Boutillier; 6–4, 7–6^{(7–4)}	(Latvia) Jānis Podžus	(Ukraine) Marat Deviatiarov (South Africa) Nicolaas Scholtz	(Italy) Erik Crepaldi (Ukraine) Vladyslav Manafov (Russia) Mikhail Vaks (Bosnia and Herzegovina) Nerman Fatić
December 15	Turkey F45 Futures; Antalya, Turkey; Hard $10,000	(Italy) Erik Crepaldi (Russia) Mikhail Vaks; 6–4, 6–2	(Serbia) Darko Jandrić (Serbia) Miki Janković	(Ukraine) Marat Deviatiarov (South Africa) Nicolaas Scholtz	(Italy) Erik Crepaldi (Ukraine) Vladyslav Manafov (Russia) Mikhail Vaks (Bosnia and Herzegovina) Nerman Fatić
December 22	Chile F12 Futures; Santiago, Chile; Clay $15,000	(Chile) Hans Podlipnik Castillo; 6–2, 6–1	(Austria) Michael Linzer	(France) Maxime Hamou (Chile) Cristian Garín	(Chile) Jorge Aguilar (Chile) Bastián Malla (Argentina) Mateo Nicolás Martínez (Chile) Gonzalo Lama
December 22	Chile F12 Futures; Santiago, Chile; Clay $15,000	(Chile) Julio Peralta (Chile) Hans Podlipnik Castillo; 7–6^{(7–3)}, 6–2	(Uruguay) Ariel Behar (Chile) Gonzalo Lama	(France) Maxime Hamou (Chile) Cristian Garín	(Chile) Jorge Aguilar (Chile) Bastián Malla (Argentina) Mateo Nicolás Martínez (Chile) Gonzalo Lama
December 22	Turkey F46 Futures; Istanbul, Turkey; Hard (indoor) $10,000	(Bosnia and Herzegovina) Aldin Šetkić; 6–1, 7–6^{(7–1)}	(Serbia) Miki Janković	(Russia) Alexander Perfilov (Ukraine) Vadym Ursu	(Austria) David Pichler (Turkey) Barış Ergüden (France) Fabien Reboul (Austria) Sebastian Ofner
December 22	Turkey F46 Futures; Istanbul, Turkey; Hard (indoor) $10,000	(Russia) Alexander Igoshin (Russia) Alexander Perfilov; 7–5, 6–4	(Turkey) Tuna Altuna (Spain) Enrique López Pérez	(Russia) Alexander Perfilov (Ukraine) Vadym Ursu	(Austria) David Pichler (Turkey) Barış Ergüden (France) Fabien Reboul (Austria) Sebastian Ofner
