= Jarmere Jenkins =

American tennis player

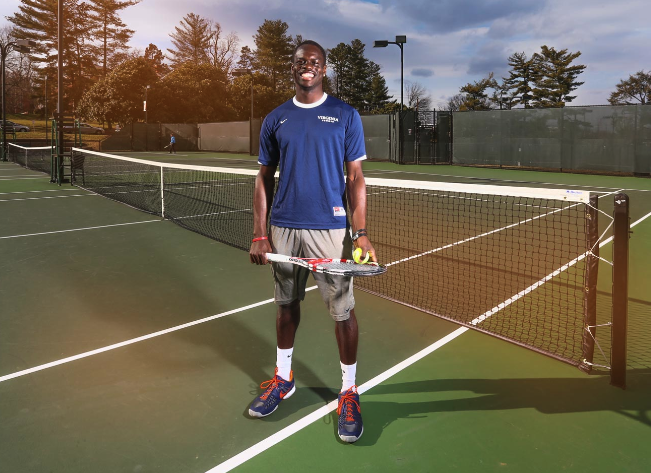
- Jarmere at the 2015 Wimbledon qualifying tournament
- Country (sports): United States
- Height: 5 ft 11 in (1.80 m)
- Turned pro: 2013
- Plays: Right-handed (two-handed backhand)
- College: University of Virginia
- Prize money: $145,669

Singles
- Career record: 0–0
- Career titles: 0
- Highest ranking: No. 190 (January 5, 2015)

Grand Slam singles results
- Australian Open: Q3 (2015)
- French Open: Q1 (2014, 2015)
- Wimbledon: Q1 (2015)
- US Open: Q3 (2013)

Doubles
- Career record: 0–1
- Career titles: 0
- Highest ranking: No. 202 (January 12, 2015)

Grand Slam doubles results
- US Open: 1R (2013)

Grand Slam mixed doubles results
- US Open: 1R (2013)

Jarmere Jenkins is a retired American professional tennis player who became the hitting partner for Serena Williams. He was the 2013 Intercollegiate Tennis Association (ITA) National Player of the Year and male ACC Athlete of the Year after earning the national championships in indoor singles, outdoor doubles and team competition while also finishing runner up in outdoor singles. He was the first Atlantic Coast Conference athlete to win ACC athlete of the year solely for tennis accomplishments. In his first full year as a pro, he cracked the top 200 in the 2014 year end rankings at 193, but the costs of travel became prohibitive for him and he retired in 2017.

== Background ==
He is from College Park, Georgia, where he attended Alpha Omega Academy. As a junior tennis player, he was the 2008 Orange Bowl doubles champion and singles finalist. He has competed in the Junior US Open, Junior French Open and Junior Wimbledon. He was finalist in the 2006 Junior US Open boys doubles. His highest junior ranking was 18 on January 1, 2008.

== College career ==
As a freshman, he was All-ACC and the VaSID State Freshman of the Year. As a sophomore, he was All-ACC and VaSID All-State. As a junior, he was an ITA Singles and Doubles All-American and ACC Player of the Year. He ended the year ranked 6th nationally in both singles and doubles although he had ranked as high as 3rd and 5th during the year. He qualified for four consecutive NCAA Singles Championships (2010–13).

He was the 2013 ITA National Player of the Year, 2013 National Collegiate Athletic Association (NCAA) Tournament MVP for the National Champion University of Virginia men's tennis team, 2013 NCAA Doubles Champion, 2013 NCAA Singles runner-up, 2012 ITA Indoor Intercollegiate singles Champion and the 2013 Anthony J. McKevlin male ACC Athlete of the Year. Although John Lucas II won for both tennis and basketball, Jenkins is the first and only person to win ACC Male Athlete of the Year solely for tennis.

== Professional career ==
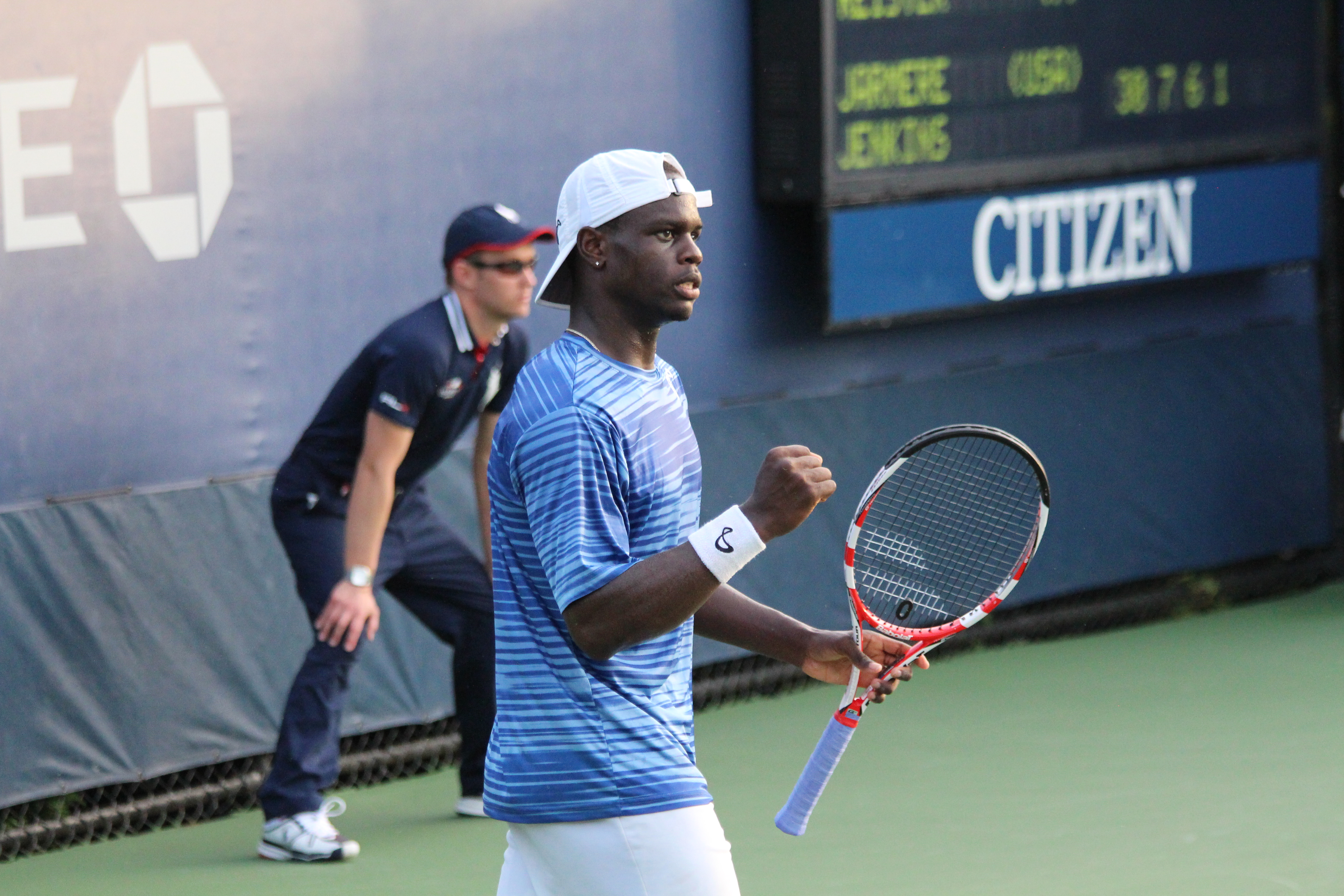
Jenkins at the 2013 US Open

He won his first professional tournament on June 30, 2013 at the $10,000 United States Tennis Association (USTA) Pro Circuit Linda Bogdan Memorial Futures Tournament. College Park, Georgia-native Jenkins, was invited to Norcross, Georgia to participate in the December 20–22 eight-man USTA wild card playoff for a spot in the main draw of the 2014 Australian Open. The field also included defending wild card playoff champion Rhyne Williams, Denis Kudla, Steve Johnson, Tennys Sandgren, Austin Krajicek, Bjorn Fratangelo, and Chase Buchanan. Jenkins lost to Kudla in two sets.

Jenkins visited Australia for six weeks in February 2014 and met with some success, including a victory over Luke Saville at the Australia F1 Futures tournament finals in Happy Valley. In late 2014, Jenkins won several tournaments. On September 20, Jenkins made tennis blooper highlights when he failed to execute the second half of an over and back double net jump. He went on to win the tournament. On September 21, the Costa Mesa Pro Classic became his fourth tournament championship as he defeated Dennis Novikov in straight sets in the finals after dispatching Daniel Manlow, Gregory Oullette, Clay Thompson, and Tennys Sandgren along the way. Three weeks later Jenkins faced the reigning US Open junior champion Omar Jasika who was making his first appearance in a Pro Tour singles finals and defeated the Australian teen in three sets to win the Cairns Tennis International Pro Tour event (Australia F7 Futures Tournament). In the Hutchinson Builders Toowoomba International final (Australia F8 Futures Tournament) the following week, Jenkins was nearly ousted in the first round when he fell behind 0–5 in the third set and faced a match point against Lawrence Bataljin. Jenkins prevailed 7–5 in that set and went on to win the tournament against top seeded Luke Saville who was returning from a two-month injury layoff. It marked consecutive Futures Tournament victories for Jenkins. Following the consecutive Australian ITF Men's Circuit wins and three Futures tournaments singles wins in five weeks (as well as 2 doubles wins in 3 weeks), Jenkins planned on moving over to the ATP Challenger Tour in Melbourne. At the 2014 Latrobe City Traralgon ATP Challenger 1, Jenkins was matched up against number 1 seed (114th ranked) Go Soeda in the first round, and 258th ranked Jenkins won in two sets. Jenkins advanced to the finals of the tournament against Bradley Klahn despite enduring a cut wrist at a key point in the semifinals before bowing out as runner-up. Jenkins' hot streak ended the following week when he was eliminated in the 2nd round by Luke Saville at the 2014 Latrobe City Traralgon ATP Challenger 2. In the Wollongong Centenary International #2 (Australia F10 Futures Tournament) on November 23, Jenkins faced Jose Rubin Statham in the finals. With Jenkins on the verge of cracking the top 200 for the first time, he won what would be his last match of 2014 by overcoming a 0–4 deficit in the second set. Having turned professional in 2013, he was ranked 193 in the 2014 yearend rankings after his first full season as a pro.

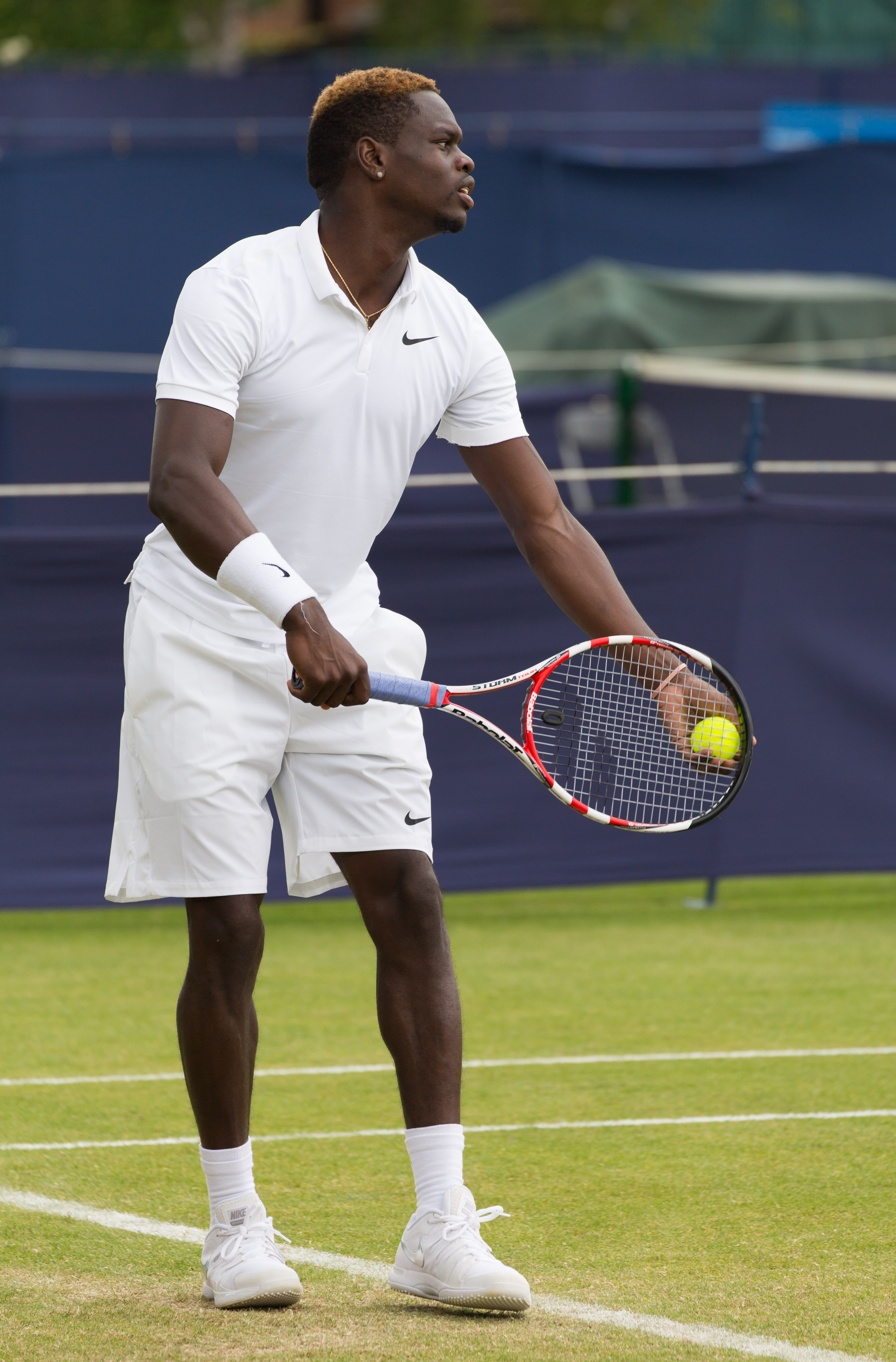
At the 2015 Aegon Surbiton Trophy tournament

In the 2015 Australian Open – Men's singles qualifying, Jenkins defeated Rajeev Ram and Marco Cecchinato before losing to Tim Pütz. Jenkins missed 10 months of competition due to an achilles tendon injury, and did not reach the finals of any tournaments between January 9, 2015 and June 27, 2016.

In the summer of 2017 Jenkins decided to retire from competitive tennis because the cost of travel became prohibitive. By August 2017, Jenkins was working as an investment sales consultant in Philadelphia. In September 2017, his brother Jermaine (who was the hitting partner for Venus Williams during the 2017 ATP World Tour) recommended Jarmere to Serena who was looking for a hitting partner following her 2017 pregnancy. Jarmere began hitting with Serena when she returned to the court following the birth of Alexis Olympia Ohanian Jr, during the 2017 US Open.

== Personal ==
The son of Jackie and Brenda Jenkins, Jarmere has eight siblings. Two of his brothers have played major college tennis (Jackie, Jr. at Northwestern, Jermaine at Clemson).

== ATP Challenger & ITF Futures finals ==
=== Singles (8–7) ===
Legend
ATP Challenger Series (0–1)
ITF Futures Series (8–6)

Outcome	No.	Date	Tournament	Surface	Opponent	Score
Runner-up	1.	July 4, 2010	USA F16 Futures, Rochester, New York	Clay	(South Korea) Daniel Yoo	3–6, 4–6
Runner-up	2.	June 23, 2013	USA F16 Futures, Amelia Island, Florida	Clay	(United States) Dennis Novikov	6–1, 6–7^{(5–7)}, 4–6
Turned Pro
Winner	3.	June 30, 2013	USA F17 Futures, Rochester, New York	Clay	(United States) Michael Shabaz	5–7, 6–2, 6–2
Runner-up	4.	September 29, 2013	USA F25 Futures, Laguna Niguel, California	Hardcourt	(United States) Marcos Giron	6–4, 1–6, 1–6
Winner	5.	February 23, 2014	Australia F1, Happy Valley, Australia	Hardcourt	(Australia) Luke Saville	6–2, 6–3
Runner-up	6.	June 22, 2014	USA F15 Futures, Indian Harbour Beach, Florida	Clay	(United States) Jared Donaldson	6–4, 3–6, 5–7
Winner	7.	September 21, 2014	USA F25 Futures, Costa Mesa, California	Hardcourt	(United States) Dennis Novikov	6–4, 6–2
Winner	8.	October 11, 2014	Australia F7 Futures, Cairns, Australia	Hardcourt	(Australia) Omar Jasika	3–6, 6–3, 6–4
Winner	9.	October 18, 2014	Australia F8 Futures, Toowoomba, Australia	Hardcourt	(Australia) Luke Saville	6–3, 7–5
Runner-up	10.	November 3, 2014	Latrobe City Traralgon Challenger 1, Traralgon, Australia	Hardcourt	(United States) Bradley Klahn	6–7^{(5–7)}, 1–6
Winner	11.	November 23, 2014	Australia F10 Futures, Wollongong, Australia	Hardcourt	(New Zealand) Jose Rubin Statham	6–4, 7–5
Runner-up	12.	September 19, 2016	Australia F5 Futures, Alice Springs, Australia	Hardcourt	(Australia) Marc Polmans	6–1, 6–7^{(3–7)}, 7–6^{(7–4)}
Winner	13.	September 26, 2016	Australia F6 Futures, Brisbane, Australia	Hardcourt	(Australia) Marc Polmans	6–1, 7–5
Winner	14.	October 3, 2016	Australia F7 Futures, Toowoomba, Australia	Hardcourt	(Australia) Blake Mott	7–6^{(7–5)}, 7–6^{(7–2)}
Winner	15.	November 7, 2016	Australia F9 Futures, Wollongong, Australia	Hardcourt	(Australia) Maverick Banes	7–6^{(8–6)}, 5–7, 2–6

=== Doubles (10–6) ===
Legend
ATP Challenger Series (1–5)
ITF Futures Series (9–1)

Outcome	No.	Date	Tournament	Surface	Partner	Opponent	Score
Winner	1.	March 1, 2009	USA F5 Futures, Harlingen, Texas	Hardcourt	(Mexico) Javier Herrera-Eguiluz	(Philippines) Treat Huey (United States) Todd Paul	1–6, 6–2, [10–8]
Winner	2.	August 8, 2010	USA F21 Futures, Decatur, Illinois	Hardcourt	(United States) Todd Paul	(United States) Michael Grant (United States) Daniel Nguyen	6–2, 7–5
Winner	3.	January 15, 2012	USA F1 Futures, Plantation, Florida	Clay	(United States) Drew Courtney	(United States) Nicholas Monroe (United States) Jack Sock	7–6^{(7–3)}, 7–5
Runner-up	4.	November 4, 2012	Charlottesville Pro Circuit Challenger, Charlottesville, Virginia	Hardcourt	(United States) Jack Sock	(Australia) John Peers (Australia) John-Patrick Smith	5–7, 1–6
Winner	5.	June 23, 2013	USA F16 Futures, Amelia Island, Florida	Clay	(United States) Mac Stylslinger	(El Salvador) Marcelo Arévalo (Venezuela) Roberto Maytín	6–4, 6–2
Turned Pro
Runner-up	6.	October 6, 2013	Sacramento Pro Circuit Challenger, Sacramento, California	Hardcourt	(United States) Donald Young	(Australia) Matt Reid (Australia) John-Patrick Smith	6–7^{(1–7)}, 6–4, [12–14]
Runner-up	7.	November 3, 2013	Charlottesville Pro Circuit Challenger, Charlottesville, Virginia	Hardcourt	(United States) Donald Young	(United States) Steve Johnson (United States) Tim Smyczek	4–6, 3–6
Winner	8.	February 9, 2014	West Lakes Challenger, Adelaide, Australia	Hardcourt	(New Zealand) Marcus Daniell	(Australia) Dane Propoggia (New Zealand) Jose Rubin Statham	6–4, 6–4
Winner	9.	October 5, 2014	Australia F6 Futures, Alice Springs, Australia	Hardcourt	(United States) Mitchell Krueger	(United Kingdom) Brydan Klein (Australia) Dane Propoggia	6–4, 6–4
Winner	10.	October 19, 2014	Australia F8 Futures, Toowoomba, Australia	Hardcourt	(United States) Mitchell Krueger	(Australia) Jake Eames (Australia) Christopher O'Connell	6–2, 6–2
Runner-up	11.	November 3, 2014	Latrobe City Traralgon Challenger 1, Traralgon, Australia	Hardcourt	(United States) Mitchell Krueger	(United Kingdom) Brydan Klein (Australia) Dane Propoggia	1–6, 6–1, [3–10]
Runner-up	12.	January 9, 2015	BNP Paribas de Nouvelle-Calédonie, Nouméa, New Caledonia, France	Hardcourt	(United States) Bradley Klahn	(United States) Austin Krajicek (United States) Tennys Sandgren	6–7^{(2–7)}, 7–6^{(7–5)}, [5–10]
Winner	13.	June 27, 2016	Egypt F13 Futures, Sharm el-Sheikh, Egypt	Hardcourt	(United States) Anderson Reed	(Italy) Alessandro Bega (Italy) Francesco Vilardo	6–3, 6–3
Winner	14.	July 4, 2016	Egypt F14 Futures, Sharm el-Sheikh, Egypt	Hardcourt	(United States) Anderson Reed	(Tunisia) Mohamed Aziz Dougaz (Spain) Javier Pulgar-García	6–3, 6–2
Runner-up	15.	July 18, 2016	Egypt F16 Futures, Sharm el-Sheikh, Egypt	Hardcourt	(United States) Anderson Reed	(Zimbabwe) Benjamin Lock (Zimbabwe) Courtney John Lock	6–3, 3–6, [8–10]
Winner	16.	November 14, 2016	Australia F10 Futures, Blacktown, Australia	Hardcourt	(Australia) Steven de Waard	(India) Sriram Balaji (India) Sanam Singh	6–4, 6–2
