= 2017 ITF Men's Circuit (July–September) =

The 2017 ITF Men's Circuit is the 2017 edition of the second-tier tour for men's professional tennis. It is organised by the International Tennis Federation and is a tier below the ATP Tour. The ITF Men's Circuit includes tournaments with prize money ranging from $15,000 up to $25,000.

== Key ==
$25,000 tournaments
$15,000 tournaments

== Month ==
=== July ===
Week of	Tournament	Winner	Runners-up	Semifinalists	Quarterfinalists
July 3	Canada F4 Futures; Saskatoon, Canada; Hard $25,000; Singles and doubles draws	(Canada) Filip Peliwo; 7–6^{(9–7)}, 6–7^{(5–7)}, 6–1	(United States) Marcos Giron	(United States) Alexander Sarkissian (United States) Raymond Sarmiento	(United States) Nathan Pasha (United States) Alexios Halebian (Canada) Raheel Manji (United States) Ronnie Schneider
July 3	Canada F4 Futures; Saskatoon, Canada; Hard $25,000; Singles and doubles draws	(United States) Alexios Halebian (United States) Alexander Sarkissian; 6–3, 7–6^{(7–0)}	(Canada) Filip Peliwo (United States) Ronnie Schneider	(United States) Alexander Sarkissian (United States) Raymond Sarmiento	(United States) Nathan Pasha (United States) Alexios Halebian (Canada) Raheel Manji (United States) Ronnie Schneider
July 3	China F11 Futures; Shenzhen, China; Hard $25,000; Singles and doubles draws	(China) Zhang Zhizhen; 2–6, 7–5, 5–0 ret.	(India) Prajnesh Gunneswaran	(Belarus) Dzmitry Zhyrmont (China) Li Zhe	(China) Wu Di (China) Sun Fajing (India) Vishnu Vardhan (India) Karunuday Singh
July 3	China F11 Futures; Shenzhen, China; Hard $25,000; Singles and doubles draws	(China) Gao Xin (China) Li Zhe; 7–6^{(7–4)}, 6–2	(China) Wu Hao (China) Xia Zihao	(Belarus) Dzmitry Zhyrmont (China) Li Zhe	(China) Wu Di (China) Sun Fajing (India) Vishnu Vardhan (India) Karunuday Singh
July 3	France F14 Futures; Bourg-en-Bresse, France; Clay $25,000; Singles and doubles draws	(France) Geoffrey Blancaneaux; 3–6, 6–2, 7–5	(France) Constant Lestienne	(Argentina) Tomás Lipovšek Puches (France) Johan Tatlot	(France) Grégoire Barrère (United States) Sekou Bangoura (France) Romain Jouan (Egypt) Karim-Mohamed Maamoun
July 3	France F14 Futures; Bourg-en-Bresse, France; Clay $25,000; Singles and doubles draws	(France) Maxime Chazal (France) Florian Reynet; 6–4, 6–2	(France) Lucas Bouquet (France) Thibault Venturino	(Argentina) Tomás Lipovšek Puches (France) Johan Tatlot	(France) Grégoire Barrère (United States) Sekou Bangoura (France) Romain Jouan (Egypt) Karim-Mohamed Maamoun
July 3	Spain F20 Futures; Getxo, Spain; Clay $25,000; Singles and doubles draws	(Spain) Bernabé Zapata Miralles; 6–3, 3–6, 6–3	(Spain) Carlos Taberner	(Russia) Ivan Gakhov (Spain) Jordi Samper Montaña	(Spain) Ricardo Ojeda Lara (Spain) Miguel Semmler (Spain) Pedro Martínez (Spain) Juan Lizariturry
July 3	Spain F20 Futures; Getxo, Spain; Clay $25,000; Singles and doubles draws	(Russia) Ivan Gakhov (Spain) David Vega Hernández; 3–6, 6–3, [10–6]	(Spain) Carlos Gómez-Herrera (Spain) Juan Lizariturry	(Russia) Ivan Gakhov (Spain) Jordi Samper Montaña	(Spain) Ricardo Ojeda Lara (Spain) Miguel Semmler (Spain) Pedro Martínez (Spain) Juan Lizariturry
July 3	USA F23 Futures; Wichita, United States; Hard $25,000; Singles and doubles draws	(United States) Christian Harrison; 1–6, 6–2, 7–5	(United States) Michael Mmoh	(United States) Emil Reinberg (Japan) Naoki Nakagawa	(United States) Govind Nanda (United States) Isaiah Strode (United States) Ryan Shane (Israel) Or Ram-Harel
July 3	USA F23 Futures; Wichita, United States; Hard $25,000; Singles and doubles draws	(United Kingdom) Luke Bambridge (Republic of Ireland) David O'Hare; 6–0, 6–3	(United States) Nathan Ponwith (United States) John Harrison Richmond	(United States) Emil Reinberg (Japan) Naoki Nakagawa	(United States) Govind Nanda (United States) Isaiah Strode (United States) Ryan Shane (Israel) Or Ram-Harel
July 3	Austria F1 Futures; Telfs, Austria; Clay $15,000; Singles and doubles draws	(Austria) Lenny Hampel; 4–6, 6–4, 6–3	(Austria) Pascal Brunner	(Italy) Andrea Pellegrino (Croatia) Mate Delić	(Romania) Călin Manda (Switzerland) Marc-Andrea Hüsler (Switzerland) Adrian Bodmer (Chinese Taipei) Yang Tsung-hua
July 3	Austria F1 Futures; Telfs, Austria; Clay $15,000; Singles and doubles draws	(Switzerland) Marc-Andrea Hüsler (Germany) Lukas Ollert; 7–5, 7–5	(Austria) Pascal Brunner (Australia) Gavin van Peperzeel	(Italy) Andrea Pellegrino (Croatia) Mate Delić	(Romania) Călin Manda (Switzerland) Marc-Andrea Hüsler (Switzerland) Adrian Bodmer (Chinese Taipei) Yang Tsung-hua
July 3	Belgium F3 Futures; De Haan, Belgium; Clay $15,000; Singles and doubles draws	(Belgium) Julien Cagnina; 6–7^{(7–9)}, 7–6^{(7–2)}, 6–4	(Belgium) Yannick Vandenbulcke	(Argentina) Juan Pablo Ficovich (France) Alexis Musialek	(Chile) Gonzalo Lama (Slovakia) Filip Horanský (Belgium) Jonas Merckx (France) Manuel Guinard
July 3	Belgium F3 Futures; De Haan, Belgium; Clay $15,000; Singles and doubles draws	(Germany) Robin Kern (Germany) Sami Reinwein; 6–1, 6–3	(Chile) Simón Navarro (Chile) Marcelo Plaza	(Argentina) Juan Pablo Ficovich (France) Alexis Musialek	(Chile) Gonzalo Lama (Slovakia) Filip Horanský (Belgium) Jonas Merckx (France) Manuel Guinard
July 3	Czech Republic F4 Futures; Ústí nad Orlicí, Czech Republic; Clay $15,000; Singles and doubles draws	(Sweden) Jonathan Mridha; 6–3, 6–4	(Czech Republic) Marek Jaloviec	(Austria) Dennis Novak (Czech Republic) Vít Kopřiva	(Czech Republic) Marek Gengel (Austria) Jan Poskocil (Czech Republic) Ondřej Krstev (Czech Republic) Jan Mertl
July 3	Czech Republic F4 Futures; Ústí nad Orlicí, Czech Republic; Clay $15,000; Singles and doubles draws	(Czech Republic) Marek Gengel (Czech Republic) Matěj Vocel; 6–7^{(3–7)}, 6–1, [16–14]	(Austria) Dennis Novak (Austria) Thomas Statzberger	(Austria) Dennis Novak (Czech Republic) Vít Kopřiva	(Czech Republic) Marek Gengel (Austria) Jan Poskocil (Czech Republic) Ondřej Krstev (Czech Republic) Jan Mertl
July 3	Egypt F19 Futures; Sharm El Sheikh, Egypt; Hard $15,000; Singles and doubles draws	(Egypt) Youssef Hossam; 6–3, 6–2	(Ukraine) Marat Deviatiarov	(Cyprus) Michail Pervolarakis (Czech Republic) Tomáš Papík	(United States) Michael Zhu (Egypt) Issam Haitham Taweel (Tunisia) Anis Ghorbel (Italy) Francesco Vilardo
July 3	Egypt F19 Futures; Sharm El Sheikh, Egypt; Hard $15,000; Singles and doubles draws	(Ukraine) Marat Deviatiarov (Czech Republic) Tomáš Papík; 6–4, 1–6, [10–5]	(United States) Nathaniel Lammons (Zimbabwe) Benjamin Lock	(Cyprus) Michail Pervolarakis (Czech Republic) Tomáš Papík	(United States) Michael Zhu (Egypt) Issam Haitham Taweel (Tunisia) Anis Ghorbel (Italy) Francesco Vilardo
July 3	Georgia F1 Futures; Telavi, Georgia; Clay $15,000; Singles and doubles draws	(Spain) Guillermo Olaso; 3–6, 6–3, 6–3	(Russia) Kristian Lozan	(Ukraine) Oleksandr Bielinskyi (France) Florent Diep	(Bolivia) Federico Zeballos (France) Valentin Vacherot (Georgia (country)) George Tsivadze (North Macedonia) Tomislav Jotovski
July 3	Georgia F1 Futures; Telavi, Georgia; Clay $15,000; Singles and doubles draws	(Bolivia) Boris Arias (Bolivia) Federico Zeballos; 7–6^{(10–8)}, 7–6^{(7–5)}	(Georgia (country)) Aleksandre Bakshi (Georgia (country)) George Tsivadze	(Ukraine) Oleksandr Bielinskyi (France) Florent Diep	(Bolivia) Federico Zeballos (France) Valentin Vacherot (Georgia (country)) George Tsivadze (North Macedonia) Tomislav Jotovski
July 3	Germany F6 Futures; Saarlouis, Germany; Clay $15,000; Singles and doubles draws	(France) Tristan Meraut; 6–3, 6–4	(France) Alexis Gautier	(Germany) Christoph Negritu (Switzerland) Raphael Baltensperger	(Switzerland) Mirko Martinez (Germany) Paul Wörner (Brazil) Daniel Dutra da Silva (Spain) Marc Giner
July 3	Germany F6 Futures; Saarlouis, Germany; Clay $15,000; Singles and doubles draws	(Romania) Patrick Grigoriu (Germany) Christoph Negritu; 7–6^{(7–2)}, 6–4	(Spain) Marc Giner (Germany) Patrick Mayer	(Germany) Christoph Negritu (Switzerland) Raphael Baltensperger	(Switzerland) Mirko Martinez (Germany) Paul Wörner (Brazil) Daniel Dutra da Silva (Spain) Marc Giner
July 3	Hong Kong F3 Futures; Hong Kong; Hard $15,000; Singles and doubles draws	(Japan) Shintaro Imai; 7–6^{(8–6)}, 6–3	(Australia) Jacob Grills	(United States) Nicholas Hu (Japan) Sora Fukuda	(Japan) Takuto Niki (Japan) Masato Shiga (Japan) Soichiro Moritani (Thailand) Wishaya Trongcharoenchaikul
July 3	Hong Kong F3 Futures; Hong Kong; Hard $15,000; Singles and doubles draws	(Japan) Shintaro Imai (Japan) Takuto Niki; 7–5, 6–2	(Hong Kong) Wong Hong Kit (Hong Kong) Yeung Pak-long	(United States) Nicholas Hu (Japan) Sora Fukuda	(Japan) Takuto Niki (Japan) Masato Shiga (Japan) Soichiro Moritani (Thailand) Wishaya Trongcharoenchaikul
July 3	Italy F20 Futures; Albinea, Italy; Clay $15,000; Singles and doubles draws	(Argentina) Andrea Collarini; 6–3, 6–3	(Italy) Filippo Leonardi	(Montenegro) Ljubomir Čelebić (Brazil) Bruno Sant'Anna	(Italy) Jacopo Stefanini (France) Ugo Humbert (Italy) Andrea Guerrieri (Italy) Adelchi Virgili
July 3	Italy F20 Futures; Albinea, Italy; Clay $15,000; Singles and doubles draws	(Italy) Omar Giacalone (Italy) Jacopo Stefanini; 5–7, 6–1, [10–5]	(Brazil) Wilson Leite (Brazil) Bruno Sant'Anna	(Montenegro) Ljubomir Čelebić (Brazil) Bruno Sant'Anna	(Italy) Jacopo Stefanini (France) Ugo Humbert (Italy) Andrea Guerrieri (Italy) Adelchi Virgili
July 3	Netherlands F3 Futures; Middelburg, Netherlands; Clay $15,000; Singles and doubles draws	(Netherlands) Thiemo de Bakker; 6–3, 6–4	(Netherlands) Botic van de Zandschulp	(Germany) Pascal Meis (Netherlands) Boy Westerhof	(Netherlands) Jelle Sels (Netherlands) Scott Griekspoor (Netherlands) Gijs Brouwer (United States) Evan King
July 3	Netherlands F3 Futures; Middelburg, Netherlands; Clay $15,000; Singles and doubles draws	(United States) Evan King (United States) Hunter Reese; 6–2, 6–1	(Netherlands) Michiel de Krom (Netherlands) Sem Verbeek	(Germany) Pascal Meis (Netherlands) Boy Westerhof	(Netherlands) Jelle Sels (Netherlands) Scott Griekspoor (Netherlands) Gijs Brouwer (United States) Evan King
July 3	Poland F4 Futures; Mrągowo, Poland; Clay $15,000; Singles and doubles draws	(Australia) Alexei Popyrin; 6–3, 3–6, 6–3	(Lithuania) Laurynas Grigelis	(United Kingdom) Billy Harris (Argentina) Mariano Kestelboim	(France) Samuel Bensoussan (Argentina) Juan Ignacio Ameal (France) Thibault Cancel (Czech Republic) David Poljak
July 3	Poland F4 Futures; Mrągowo, Poland; Clay $15,000; Singles and doubles draws	(Poland) Adrian Andrzejczuk (Poland) Paweł Ciaś; 6–7^{(1–7)}, 7–6^{(8–6)}, [10–7]	(Ukraine) Olexiy Kolisnyk (Ukraine) Oleg Prihodko	(United Kingdom) Billy Harris (Argentina) Mariano Kestelboim	(France) Samuel Bensoussan (Argentina) Juan Ignacio Ameal (France) Thibault Cancel (Czech Republic) David Poljak
July 3	Portugal F10 Futures; Torres Vedras, Portugal; Hard $15,000; Singles and doubles draws	(Spain) Roberto Ortega Olmedo; 6–3, 6–2	(Portugal) Frederico Ferreira Silva	(France) Albano Olivetti (Portugal) João Monteiro	(Australia) Bradley Mousley (Spain) Pablo Vivero González (Spain) David Pérez Sanz (Spain) Jaime Pulgar-García
July 3	Portugal F10 Futures; Torres Vedras, Portugal; Hard $15,000; Singles and doubles draws	(Venezuela) Jordi Muñoz Abreu (Spain) David Pérez Sanz; 6–4, 7–6^{(7–5)}	(France) Albano Olivetti (France) Hugo Voljacques	(France) Albano Olivetti (Portugal) João Monteiro	(Australia) Bradley Mousley (Spain) Pablo Vivero González (Spain) David Pérez Sanz (Spain) Jaime Pulgar-García
July 3	Russia F3 Futures; Kazan, Russia; Hard $15,000; Singles and doubles draws	(Russia) Pavel Kotov; 6–2, 6–3	(Russia) Yan Sabanin	(Serbia) Dejan Katić (Russia) Artur Shakhnubaryan	(Uzbekistan) Saida'Lo Saidkarimov (Russia) Maxim Ratniuk (Russia) Denis Matsukevich (Russia) Timur Kiyamov
July 3	Russia F3 Futures; Kazan, Russia; Hard $15,000; Singles and doubles draws	(Russia) Victor Baluda (Russia) Alexander Pavlioutchenkov; 7–5, 6–2	(Russia) Richard Muzaev (Russia) Vladimir Polyakov	(Serbia) Dejan Katić (Russia) Artur Shakhnubaryan	(Uzbekistan) Saida'Lo Saidkarimov (Russia) Maxim Ratniuk (Russia) Denis Matsukevich (Russia) Timur Kiyamov
July 3	Sri Lanka F3 Futures; Colombo, Sri Lanka; Clay $15,000; Singles and doubles draws	(India) Sumit Nagal; 6–1, 6–1	(Spain) Carlos Boluda-Purkiss	(Ukraine) Yurii Dzhavakian (Italy) Fabrizio Ornago	(France) Pierre Faivre (India) Sidharth Rawat (India) Ranjeet Virali-Murugesan (Austria) Peter Goldsteiner
July 3	Sri Lanka F3 Futures; Colombo, Sri Lanka; Clay $15,000; Singles and doubles draws	(India) Ankit Chopra (United States) Hady Habib; 2–6, 7–5, [10–8]	(India) Chandril Sood (India) Lakshit Sood	(Ukraine) Yurii Dzhavakian (Italy) Fabrizio Ornago	(France) Pierre Faivre (India) Sidharth Rawat (India) Ranjeet Virali-Murugesan (Austria) Peter Goldsteiner
July 10	China F12 Futures; Shenzhen, China; Hard $25,000; Singles and doubles draws	(China) Wang Chuhan; 6–4, 7–6^{(7–5)}	(Chinese Taipei) Wu Tung-lin	(China) Sun Fajing (Thailand) Wishaya Trongcharoenchaikul	(China) Wu Di (Vietnam) Lý Hoàng Nam (Belarus) Dzmitry Zhyrmont (India) Vishnu Vardhan
July 10	China F12 Futures; Shenzhen, China; Hard $25,000; Singles and doubles draws	(Vietnam) Lý Hoàng Nam (China) Sun Fajing; 6–4, 6–4	(Philippines) Francis Casey Alcantara (India) Karunuday Singh	(China) Sun Fajing (Thailand) Wishaya Trongcharoenchaikul	(China) Wu Di (Vietnam) Lý Hoàng Nam (Belarus) Dzmitry Zhyrmont (India) Vishnu Vardhan
July 10	Czech Republic F5 Futures; Pardubice, Czech Republic; Clay $25,000; Singles and doubles draws	(Austria) Dennis Novak; 7–6^{(7–3)}, 6–3	(Slovakia) Alex Molčan	(Czech Republic) Vít Kopřiva (France) Fabien Reboul	(Czech Republic) Petr Nouza (Czech Republic) Jan Mertl (Slovakia) Patrik Néma (Uzbekistan) Sanjar Fayziev
July 10	Czech Republic F5 Futures; Pardubice, Czech Republic; Clay $25,000; Singles and doubles draws	(Czech Republic) Vít Kopřiva (Czech Republic) Jaroslav Pospíšil; 4–6, 6–1, [10–2]	(Croatia) Ivan Sabanov (Croatia) Matej Sabanov	(Czech Republic) Vít Kopřiva (France) Fabien Reboul	(Czech Republic) Petr Nouza (Czech Republic) Jan Mertl (Slovakia) Patrik Néma (Uzbekistan) Sanjar Fayziev
July 10	France F15 Futures; Ajaccio, France; Hard $25,000+H; Singles and doubles draws	(Italy) Edoardo Eremin; 6–2, 6–3	(France) Albano Olivetti	(France) Sadio Doumbia (United States) Peter Kobelt	(France) Yannick Jankovits (France) Laurent Lokoli (France) Jonathan Kanar (France) Florian Lakat
July 10	France F15 Futures; Ajaccio, France; Hard $25,000+H; Singles and doubles draws	(France) Yannick Jankovits (France) Jonathan Kanar; 6–4, 6–2	(Republic of Ireland) Sam Barry (United States) Peter Kobelt	(France) Sadio Doumbia (United States) Peter Kobelt	(France) Yannick Jankovits (France) Laurent Lokoli (France) Jonathan Kanar (France) Florian Lakat
July 10	Italy F21 Futures; Casinalbo, Italy; Clay $25,000; Singles and doubles draws	(Italy) Gianluca Mager; 4–6, 7–6^{(7–0)}, 6–2	(Argentina) Andrea Collarini	(Argentina) Federico Coria (Italy) Pietro Licciardi	(Italy) Marco Bortolotti (Brazil) Bruno Sant'Anna (Italy) Filippo Leonardi (Italy) Andrea Pellegrino
July 10	Italy F21 Futures; Casinalbo, Italy; Clay $25,000; Singles and doubles draws	(Argentina) Federico Coria (Brazil) Bruno Sant'Anna; 6–3, 4–6, [10–8]	(Italy) Enrico Dalla Valle (Italy) Andrea Pellegrino	(Argentina) Federico Coria (Italy) Pietro Licciardi	(Italy) Marco Bortolotti (Brazil) Bruno Sant'Anna (Italy) Filippo Leonardi (Italy) Andrea Pellegrino
July 10	Spain F21 Futures; Gandia, Spain; Clay $25,000; Singles and doubles draws	(Spain) Bernabé Zapata Miralles; 6–3, 5–7, 7–5	(Spain) Sergio Gutiérrez Ferrol	(Spain) Pedro Martínez (Russia) Ivan Gakhov	(Spain) Gerard Granollers (Spain) Carlos Taberner (Spain) Javier Martí (Spain) David Vega Hernández
July 10	Spain F21 Futures; Gandia, Spain; Clay $25,000; Singles and doubles draws	(Spain) Marc Giner (Spain) Pedro Martínez; 7–6^{(7–4)}, 6–3	(Russia) Ivan Gakhov (Spain) Sergio Martos Gornés	(Spain) Pedro Martínez (Russia) Ivan Gakhov	(Spain) Gerard Granollers (Spain) Carlos Taberner (Spain) Javier Martí (Spain) David Vega Hernández
July 10	Austria F2 Futures; Kramsach, Austria; Clay $15,000; Singles and doubles draws	(Germany) Daniel Brands; 7–6^{(7–5)}, 6–1	(Germany) Jeremy Jahn	(Chinese Taipei) Yang Tsung-hua (Austria) Pascal Brunner	(Austria) Alexander Erler (Austria) Lenny Hampel (Italy) Matteo Viola (Germany) Sebastian Prechtel
July 10	Austria F2 Futures; Kramsach, Austria; Clay $15,000; Singles and doubles draws	(Austria) Pascal Brunner (Austria) Maximilian Neuchrist; 6–2, 2–6, [10–5]	(Switzerland) Adrian Bodmer (Germany) Jakob Sude	(Chinese Taipei) Yang Tsung-hua (Austria) Pascal Brunner	(Austria) Alexander Erler (Austria) Lenny Hampel (Italy) Matteo Viola (Germany) Sebastian Prechtel
July 10	Belgium F4 Futures; Lasne, Belgium; Clay $15,000; Singles and doubles draws	(France) Corentin Denolly; 6–3, 6–0	(Argentina) Juan Pablo Ficovich	(Chile) Gonzalo Lama (France) Alexis Musialek	(France) Alexandre Müller (Belgium) Christopher Heyman (France) Manuel Guinard (France) Maxime Tabatruong
July 10	Belgium F4 Futures; Lasne, Belgium; Clay $15,000; Singles and doubles draws	(France) Corentin Denolly (France) Alexandre Müller; 6–1, 6–3	(France) Maxence Brovillé (France) Clément Tabur	(Chile) Gonzalo Lama (France) Alexis Musialek	(France) Alexandre Müller (Belgium) Christopher Heyman (France) Manuel Guinard (France) Maxime Tabatruong
July 10	Egypt F20 Futures; Sharm El Sheikh, Egypt; Hard $15,000; Singles and doubles draws	(Egypt) Mohamed Safwat; 6–4, 7–5	(Italy) Lorenzo Frigerio	(Italy) Julian Ocleppo (Czech Republic) Tomáš Papík	(Italy) Francesco Vilardo (Italy) Andrea Vavassori (United States) Michael Zhu (Portugal) Bernardo Saraiva
July 10	Egypt F20 Futures; Sharm El Sheikh, Egypt; Hard $15,000; Singles and doubles draws	(Italy) Julian Ocleppo (Italy) Andrea Vavassori; 2–6, 6–3, [10–8]	(United States) Nathaniel Lammons (Portugal) Bernardo Saraiva	(Italy) Julian Ocleppo (Czech Republic) Tomáš Papík	(Italy) Francesco Vilardo (Italy) Andrea Vavassori (United States) Michael Zhu (Portugal) Bernardo Saraiva
July 10	Georgia F2 Futures; Telavi, Georgia; Clay $15,000; Singles and doubles draws	(North Macedonia) Tomislav Jotovski; 7–6^{(7–3)}, 6–7^{(7–9)}, 7–6^{(7–4)}	(Spain) Guillermo Olaso	(Bosnia and Herzegovina) Nerman Fatić (Bolivia) Federico Zeballos	(Russia) Dimitriy Voronin (Russia) Kirill Kivattsev (Georgia (country)) George Tsivadze (Ukraine) Oleksandr Bielinskyi
July 10	Georgia F2 Futures; Telavi, Georgia; Clay $15,000; Singles and doubles draws	(Bolivia) Boris Arias (Bolivia) Federico Zeballos; 5–7, 6–3, [10–8]	(Bosnia and Herzegovina) Nerman Fatić (Croatia) Antun Vidak	(Bosnia and Herzegovina) Nerman Fatić (Bolivia) Federico Zeballos	(Russia) Dimitriy Voronin (Russia) Kirill Kivattsev (Georgia (country)) George Tsivadze (Ukraine) Oleksandr Bielinskyi
July 10	Germany F7 Futures; Trier, Germany; Clay $15,000; Singles and doubles draws	(Russia) Alexey Vatutin; 2–6, 6–4, 6–2	(Spain) Enrique López Pérez	(Germany) Jan Choinski (Germany) Dominik Böhler	(Belgium) Julien Cagnina (Slovakia) Filip Horanský (Germany) Christian Hirschmüller (Germany) Benjamin Hassan
July 10	Germany F7 Futures; Trier, Germany; Clay $15,000; Singles and doubles draws	(Romania) Vasile Antonescu (Romania) Patrick Grigoriu; 5–7, 6–4, [10–1]	(Australia) Scott Puodziunas (United States) Hunter Reese	(Germany) Jan Choinski (Germany) Dominik Böhler	(Belgium) Julien Cagnina (Slovakia) Filip Horanský (Germany) Christian Hirschmüller (Germany) Benjamin Hassan
July 10	Netherlands F4 Futures; Amstelveen, Netherlands; Clay $15,000; Singles and doubles draws	(Serbia) Marko Tepavac; 6–3, 6–3	(Netherlands) Gijs Brouwer	(Netherlands) Boy Westerhof (Brazil) Ricardo Hocevar	(Netherlands) Jelle Sels (United Kingdom) Tom Farquharson (Netherlands) Stephan Fransen (Netherlands) Niels Lootsma
July 10	Netherlands F4 Futures; Amstelveen, Netherlands; Clay $15,000; Singles and doubles draws	(Netherlands) Botic van de Zandschulp (Netherlands) Boy Westerhof; 6–1, 6–7^{(4–7)}, [10–3]	(Netherlands) Niels Lootsma (Germany) Christoph Negritu	(Netherlands) Boy Westerhof (Brazil) Ricardo Hocevar	(Netherlands) Jelle Sels (United Kingdom) Tom Farquharson (Netherlands) Stephan Fransen (Netherlands) Niels Lootsma
July 10	Poland F5 Futures; Mrągowo, Poland; Clay $15,000; Singles and doubles draws	(Czech Republic) Zdeněk Kolář; 7–5, 1–0 ret.	(Lithuania) Laurynas Grigelis	(Italy) Antonio Massara (France) Samuel Bensoussan	(Poland) Paweł Ciaś (Poland) Maciej Smoła (United Kingdom) Richard Gabb (France) Elliot Benchetrit
July 10	Poland F5 Futures; Mrągowo, Poland; Clay $15,000; Singles and doubles draws	(United Kingdom) Ewan Moore (Argentina) Manuel Peña López; 6–2, 7–5	(Poland) Kamil Gajewski (Poland) Szymon Walków	(Italy) Antonio Massara (France) Samuel Bensoussan	(Poland) Paweł Ciaś (Poland) Maciej Smoła (United Kingdom) Richard Gabb (France) Elliot Benchetrit
July 10	Portugal F11 Futures; Póvoa de Varzim, Portugal; Hard $15,000; Singles and doubles draws	(Australia) Alex de Minaur; 6–1, 2–6, 6–4	(Portugal) Frederico Ferreira Silva	(Spain) Roberto Ortega Olmedo (Portugal) João Monteiro	(Spain) Pablo Vivero González (France) Antoine Escoffier (Monaco) Lucas Catarina (Portugal) Nuno Deus
July 10	Portugal F11 Futures; Póvoa de Varzim, Portugal; Hard $15,000; Singles and doubles draws	(Australia) Alex de Minaur (Spain) Roberto Ortega Olmedo; 6–2, 6–1	(Australia) Edward Bourchier (Australia) Daniel Nolan	(Spain) Roberto Ortega Olmedo (Portugal) João Monteiro	(Spain) Pablo Vivero González (France) Antoine Escoffier (Monaco) Lucas Catarina (Portugal) Nuno Deus
July 10	Turkey F25 Futures; Istanbul, Turkey; Clay $15,000; Singles and doubles draws	(France) Geoffrey Blancaneaux; 7–5, 6–1	(Uruguay) Martín Cuevas	(Serbia) Nikola Ćaćić (Bulgaria) Dimitar Kuzmanov	(Turkey) Cem İlkel (France) Thomas Bréchemier (France) Jules Okala (Spain) Adria Mas Mascolo
July 10	Turkey F25 Futures; Istanbul, Turkey; Clay $15,000; Singles and doubles draws	(Serbia) Miki Janković (Bulgaria) Dimitar Kuzmanov; 6–4, 2–6, [11–9]	(Serbia) Nikola Ćaćić (Bulgaria) Vasko Mladenov	(Serbia) Nikola Ćaćić (Bulgaria) Dimitar Kuzmanov	(Turkey) Cem İlkel (France) Thomas Bréchemier (France) Jules Okala (Spain) Adria Mas Mascolo
July 17	China F13 Futures; Yinchuan, China; Hard $25,000; Singles and doubles draws	(Japan) Sora Fukuda; 6–3, 7–5	(China) Zhang Zhizhen	(China) Sun Fajing (Japan) Hiroyasu Ehara	(Chinese Taipei) Hung Jui-chen (Chinese Taipei) Lee Kuan-yi (Thailand) Wishaya Trongcharoenchaikul (Philippines) Francis Casey Alcantara
July 17	China F13 Futures; Yinchuan, China; Hard $25,000; Singles and doubles draws	(Chinese Taipei) Hung Jui-chen (Thailand) Wishaya Trongcharoenchaikul; 6–2, 3–6, [12–10]	(China) Wu Hao (China) Xia Zihao	(China) Sun Fajing (Japan) Hiroyasu Ehara	(Chinese Taipei) Hung Jui-chen (Chinese Taipei) Lee Kuan-yi (Thailand) Wishaya Trongcharoenchaikul (Philippines) Francis Casey Alcantara
July 17	Czech Republic F6 Futures; Brno, Czech Republic; Clay $25,000; Singles and doubles draws	(Argentina) Juan Pablo Ficovich; 7–5, 6–4	(Czech Republic) Jan Mertl	(Czech Republic) Václav Šafránek (Czech Republic) Petr Nouza	(Slovakia) Alex Molčan (Czech Republic) Vít Kopřiva (Slovakia) Lukáš Klein (Czech Republic) Robin Staněk
July 17	Czech Republic F6 Futures; Brno, Czech Republic; Clay $25,000; Singles and doubles draws	(Czech Republic) Jan Mertl (Czech Republic) Václav Šafránek; 6–4, 7–6^{(10–8)}	(Austria) Lenny Hampel (Czech Republic) Robin Staněk	(Czech Republic) Václav Šafránek (Czech Republic) Petr Nouza	(Slovakia) Alex Molčan (Czech Republic) Vít Kopřiva (Slovakia) Lukáš Klein (Czech Republic) Robin Staněk
July 17	Germany F8 Futures; Kassel, Germany; Clay $25,000+H; Singles and doubles draws	(Estonia) Jürgen Zopp; 6–3, 6–2	(Germany) Jan Choinski	(Germany) Jeremy Jahn (Germany) Dominik Böhler	(Germany) Elmar Ejupovic (Austria) Gibril Diarra (Belgium) Christopher Heyman (Spain) Enrique López Pérez
July 17	Germany F8 Futures; Kassel, Germany; Clay $25,000+H; Singles and doubles draws	(Germany) Mats Moraing (Germany) Tom Schönenberg; 7–6^{(7–4)}, 2–6, [10–2]	(Austria) Maximilian Neuchrist (Austria) David Pichler	(Germany) Jeremy Jahn (Germany) Dominik Böhler	(Germany) Elmar Ejupovic (Austria) Gibril Diarra (Belgium) Christopher Heyman (Spain) Enrique López Pérez
July 17	Ireland F1 Futures; Dublin, Ireland; Carpet $25,000; Singles and doubles draws	(United Kingdom) Tom Farquharson; 6–4, 6–1	(United Kingdom) Ryan James Storrie	(France) Rémi Boutillier (France) Yannick Jankovits	(United States) Peter Kobelt (United Kingdom) Sean Hodkin (United Kingdom) Joshua Paris (United Kingdom) Lloyd Glasspool
July 17	Ireland F1 Futures; Dublin, Ireland; Carpet $25,000; Singles and doubles draws	(United Kingdom) Scott Clayton (United Kingdom) Jonny O'Mara; 6–1, 6–3	(Republic of Ireland) Peter Bothwell (United Kingdom) Lloyd Glasspool	(France) Rémi Boutillier (France) Yannick Jankovits	(United States) Peter Kobelt (United Kingdom) Sean Hodkin (United Kingdom) Joshua Paris (United Kingdom) Lloyd Glasspool
July 17	Spain F22 Futures; Dénia, Spain; Clay $25,000; Singles and doubles draws	(Spain) Javier Barranco Cosano; 6–1, 6–4	(Spain) Juan Lizariturry	(Spain) David Vega Hernández (Russia) Ivan Gakhov	(Spain) Pedro Martínez (Switzerland) Vullnet Tashi (Spain) Eduard Esteve Lobato (Spain) Gerard Granollers
July 17	Spain F22 Futures; Dénia, Spain; Clay $25,000; Singles and doubles draws	(Russia) Ivan Gakhov (Spain) Pedro Martínez; 7–5, 6–7^{(7–9)}, [11–9]	(Spain) Juan Lizariturry (Spain) Jaume Pla Malfeito	(Spain) David Vega Hernández (Russia) Ivan Gakhov	(Spain) Pedro Martínez (Switzerland) Vullnet Tashi (Spain) Eduard Esteve Lobato (Spain) Gerard Granollers
July 17	Turkey F26 Futures; Istanbul, Turkey; Clay $25,000; Singles and doubles draws	(France) Geoffrey Blancaneaux; 6–7^{(8–10)}, 6–4, 6–2	(Brazil) Bruno Sant'Anna	(France) Jules Okala (Russia) Alexander Igoshin	(Serbia) Miki Janković (Uruguay) Martín Cuevas (Argentina) Dante Gennaro (Romania) Dragoș Dima
July 17	Turkey F26 Futures; Istanbul, Turkey; Clay $25,000; Singles and doubles draws	(Turkey) Sarp Ağabigün (Ukraine) Marat Deviatiarov; 6–2, 7–6^{(7–5)}	(Russia) Alexander Igoshin (Bulgaria) Vasko Mladenov	(France) Jules Okala (Russia) Alexander Igoshin	(Serbia) Miki Janković (Uruguay) Martín Cuevas (Argentina) Dante Gennaro (Romania) Dragoș Dima
July 17	USA F24 Futures; Champaign, United States; Hard $25,000; Singles and doubles draws	(Germany) Dominik Köpfer; 6–7^{(5–7)}, 6–2, 7–5	(New Zealand) José Statham	(Venezuela) Ricardo Rodríguez (United States) Brandon Holt	(United States) Harrison Adams (United States) Jeffrey Schorsch (United States) Eric James Johnson (United States) Ezekiel Clark
July 17	USA F24 Futures; Champaign, United States; Hard $25,000; Singles and doubles draws	(United States) Brandon Holt (United States) Riley Smith; 3–6, 6–1, [12–10]	(United States) Tomas Stillman (United States) Shane Vinsant	(Venezuela) Ricardo Rodríguez (United States) Brandon Holt	(United States) Harrison Adams (United States) Jeffrey Schorsch (United States) Eric James Johnson (United States) Ezekiel Clark
July 17	Austria F3 Futures; Wels, Austria; Clay $15,000; Singles and doubles draws	(Slovakia) Filip Horanský; 6–3, 6–3	(Austria) Matthias Haim	(Germany) Robin Kern (Norway) Viktor Durasovic	(Belgium) Julien Cagnina (Austria) Gabriel Schmidt (Austria) Thomas Statzberger (Germany) Johannes Härteis
July 17	Austria F3 Futures; Wels, Austria; Clay $15,000; Singles and doubles draws	(Germany) Robin Kern (Germany) Sami Reinwein; 6–4, 6–3	(Austria) Philipp Schroll (Uruguay) Nicolás Xiviller	(Germany) Robin Kern (Norway) Viktor Durasovic	(Belgium) Julien Cagnina (Austria) Gabriel Schmidt (Austria) Thomas Statzberger (Germany) Johannes Härteis
July 17	Belgium F5 Futures; Knokke, Belgium; Clay $15,000; Singles and doubles draws	(France) Maxime Tabatruong; 5–0, ret.	(Belgium) Julien Dubail	(Belgium) Jolan Cailleau (Chile) Juan Carlos Sáez	(Belgium) Jonas Merckx (France) Florian Lakat (Germany) Mats Rosenkranz (France) Louis Chaix
July 17	Belgium F5 Futures; Knokke, Belgium; Clay $15,000; Singles and doubles draws	(France) Constant de la Bassetière (France) Quentin Folliot; 3–6, 6–1, [11–9]	(Belgium) Benjamin D'Hoe (Mexico) Eduardo Peralta-Tello	(Belgium) Jolan Cailleau (Chile) Juan Carlos Sáez	(Belgium) Jonas Merckx (France) Florian Lakat (Germany) Mats Rosenkranz (France) Louis Chaix
July 17	Colombia F1 Futures; Valledupar, Colombia; Hard $15,000; Singles and doubles draws	(Colombia) Daniel Elahi Galán; 6–3, 7–5	(Guatemala) Christopher Díaz Figueroa	(Argentina) Facundo Argüello (Argentina) Franco Emanuel Egea	(Argentina) Facundo Mena (Colombia) Juan Sebastián Gómez (Argentina) Federico Moreno (Dominican Republic) José Olivares
July 17	Colombia F1 Futures; Valledupar, Colombia; Hard $15,000; Singles and doubles draws	(Colombia) Juan Sebastián Gómez (Mexico) Luis Patiño; 6–2, 7–6^{(7–4)}	(Argentina) Nicolás Alberto Arreche (Peru) Alexander Merino	(Argentina) Facundo Argüello (Argentina) Franco Emanuel Egea	(Argentina) Facundo Mena (Colombia) Juan Sebastián Gómez (Argentina) Federico Moreno (Dominican Republic) José Olivares
July 17	Egypt F21 Futures; Sharm El Sheikh, Egypt; Hard $15,000; Singles and doubles draws	(Italy) Lorenzo Frigerio; 6–4, 6–3	(United Kingdom) Julian Cash	(Tunisia) Anis Ghorbel (Italy) Andrea Vavassori	(Italy) Julian Ocleppo (Germany) Frederik Press (Spain) José Francisco Vidal Azorín (Italy) Antonio Zucca
July 17	Egypt F21 Futures; Sharm El Sheikh, Egypt; Hard $15,000; Singles and doubles draws	(United States) Junior Alexander Ore (United States) Michael Zhu; 6–2, 6–3	(United Kingdom) Julian Cash (United States) Tyler Mercier	(Tunisia) Anis Ghorbel (Italy) Andrea Vavassori	(Italy) Julian Ocleppo (Germany) Frederik Press (Spain) José Francisco Vidal Azorín (Italy) Antonio Zucca
July 17	France F16 Futures; Uriage, France; Clay $15,000; Singles and doubles draws	(France) Alexandre Müller; 5–7, 7–6^{(7–1)}, 6–4	(France) Corentin Denolly	(France) Johan Tatlot (France) Corentin Moutet	(France) Baptiste Crepatte (France) Thomas Bréchemier (France) Antoine Hoang (France) Pierre Faivre
July 17	France F16 Futures; Uriage, France; Clay $15,000; Singles and doubles draws	(France) Corentin Denolly (France) Alexandre Müller; 6–3, 7–5	(Switzerland) Antoine Bellier (France) Johan Tatlot	(France) Johan Tatlot (France) Corentin Moutet	(France) Baptiste Crepatte (France) Thomas Bréchemier (France) Antoine Hoang (France) Pierre Faivre
July 17	Georgia F3 Futures; Telavi, Georgia; Clay $15,000; Singles and doubles draws	(Russia) Kirill Kivattsev; 7–6^{(7–4)}, 7–6^{(8–6)}	(Bosnia and Herzegovina) Nerman Fatić	(Canada) David Volfson (North Macedonia) Tomislav Jotovski	(Brazil) Caio Silva (Ukraine) Oleksandr Bielinskyi (Italy) Cristian Carli (Georgia (country)) Aleksandre Bakshi
July 17	Georgia F3 Futures; Telavi, Georgia; Clay $15,000; Singles and doubles draws	(Russia) Ivan Kalinin (Russia) Kirill Kivattsev; 6–4, 6–7^{(6–8)}, [10–7]	(Bolivia) Boris Arias (Bolivia) Federico Zeballos	(Canada) David Volfson (North Macedonia) Tomislav Jotovski	(Brazil) Caio Silva (Ukraine) Oleksandr Bielinskyi (Italy) Cristian Carli (Georgia (country)) Aleksandre Bakshi
July 17	Italy F22 Futures; Gubbio, Italy; Clay $15,000; Singles and doubles draws	(Italy) Riccardo Bonadio; 6–3, 7–6^{(7–2)}	(Italy) Pietro Rondoni	(United Kingdom) Jay Clarke (Italy) Giovanni Fonio	(Italy) Davide Galoppini (Italy) Mirko Cutuli (Italy) Claudio Fortuna (Italy) Marco Miceli
July 17	Italy F22 Futures; Gubbio, Italy; Clay $15,000; Singles and doubles draws	(Italy) Gianluca Di Nicola (Italy) Giorgio Portaluri; 6–2, 6–2	(Italy) Riccardo Balzerani (Italy) Enrico Dalla Valle	(United Kingdom) Jay Clarke (Italy) Giovanni Fonio	(Italy) Davide Galoppini (Italy) Mirko Cutuli (Italy) Claudio Fortuna (Italy) Marco Miceli
July 17	Lithuania F1 Futures; Vilnius, Lithuania; Clay $15,000; Singles and doubles draws	(Russia) Ronald Slobodchikov; 6–3, 7–6^{(7–4)}	(Germany) Christian Hirschmüller	(Sweden) Patrik Brydolf (Russia) Vladimir Polyakov	(Denmark) Søren Hess-Olesen (Germany) Luca Gelhardt (Lithuania) Julius Tverijonas (Italy) Andrea Guerrieri
July 17	Lithuania F1 Futures; Vilnius, Lithuania; Clay $15,000; Singles and doubles draws	(France) Gabriel Petit (France) François-Arthur Vibert; 6–3, 6–2	(Russia) Ivan Davydov (Russia) Vladimir Polyakov	(Sweden) Patrik Brydolf (Russia) Vladimir Polyakov	(Denmark) Søren Hess-Olesen (Germany) Luca Gelhardt (Lithuania) Julius Tverijonas (Italy) Andrea Guerrieri
July 17	Morocco F1 Futures; Tangier, Morocco; Clay $15,000; Singles and doubles draws	(Colombia) Juan Manuel Benítez Chavarriaga; 6–2, 7–6^{(7–2)}	(United States) Raleigh Smith	(Spain) Fernando Bogajo (France) Manuel Guinard	(Morocco) Soufiane El Mesbahi (United States) Nick Chappell (Italy) Francesco Bessire (Spain) Aarón Cortés Alcaraz
July 17	Morocco F1 Futures; Tangier, Morocco; Clay $15,000; Singles and doubles draws	(Colombia) Juan Manuel Benítez Chavarriaga (United States) Raleigh Smith; 6–4, 7–6^{(7–3)}	(United States) Nick Chappell (Tunisia) Skander Mansouri	(Spain) Fernando Bogajo (France) Manuel Guinard	(Morocco) Soufiane El Mesbahi (United States) Nick Chappell (Italy) Francesco Bessire (Spain) Aarón Cortés Alcaraz
July 17	Poland F6 Futures; Mrągowo, Poland; Clay $15,000; Singles and doubles draws	(Poland) Adam Chadaj; 6–1, 6–3	(United Kingdom) Richard Gabb	(Czech Republic) Michal Schmid (Netherlands) Colin van Beem	(Italy) Fabrizio Ornago (Germany) Bastian Wagner (Ukraine) Olexiy Kolisnyk (Poland) Piotr Matuszewski
July 17	Poland F6 Futures; Mrągowo, Poland; Clay $15,000; Singles and doubles draws	(Ukraine) Olexiy Kolisnyk (Ukraine) Oleg Prihodko; 6–4, 6–3	(Netherlands) Colin van Beem (Ukraine) Daniil Zarichanskyy	(Czech Republic) Michal Schmid (Netherlands) Colin van Beem	(Italy) Fabrizio Ornago (Germany) Bastian Wagner (Ukraine) Olexiy Kolisnyk (Poland) Piotr Matuszewski
July 17	Portugal F12 Futures; Idanha-a-Nova, Portugal; Hard $15,000; Singles and doubles draws	(Monaco) Lucas Catarina; 6–4, 6–4	(Spain) David Pérez Sanz	(Australia) Alex de Minaur (Spain) Nicolás Álvarez Varona	(Italy) Erik Crepaldi (France) Antoine Escoffier (United Kingdom) Jonathan Gray (Portugal) Daniel Batista
July 17	Portugal F12 Futures; Idanha-a-Nova, Portugal; Hard $15,000; Singles and doubles draws	(Spain) David Pérez Sanz (Spain) Pablo Vivero González; 6–7^{(7–9)}, 7–5, [10–7]	(Portugal) Francisco Cabral (Portugal) Gonçalo Falcão	(Australia) Alex de Minaur (Spain) Nicolás Álvarez Varona	(Italy) Erik Crepaldi (France) Antoine Escoffier (United Kingdom) Jonathan Gray (Portugal) Daniel Batista
July 24	China F14 Futures; Tianjin, China; Hard $25,000; Singles and doubles draws	(Serbia) Nikola Milojević; 6–4, 6–2	(China) Li Zhe	(Japan) Shuichi Sekiguchi (Japan) Hiroyasu Ehara	(Japan) Issei Okamura (India) Karunuday Singh (Japan) Sora Fukuda (China) Wang Aoran
July 24	China F14 Futures; Tianjin, China; Hard $25,000; Singles and doubles draws	(Japan) Hiroyasu Ehara (Japan) Sho Katayama; 6–3, 6–3	(Chinese Taipei) Huang Liang-chi (China) Wang Aoran	(Japan) Shuichi Sekiguchi (Japan) Hiroyasu Ehara	(Japan) Issei Okamura (India) Karunuday Singh (Japan) Sora Fukuda (China) Wang Aoran
July 24	France F17 Futures; Troyes, France; Clay $25,000; Singles and doubles draws	(Italy) Adelchi Virgili; 2–6, 6–4, 6–3	(France) Antoine Hoang	(France) Jules Okala (France) Evan Furness	(France) Alexandre Müller (France) Grégoire Jacq (France) Ronan Joncour (France) Dan Added
July 24	France F17 Futures; Troyes, France; Clay $25,000; Singles and doubles draws	(France) Antoine Hoang (France) Grégoire Jacq; 6–4, 6–0	(France) Constant de la Bassetière (France) Ugo Humbert	(France) Jules Okala (France) Evan Furness	(France) Alexandre Müller (France) Grégoire Jacq (France) Ronan Joncour (France) Dan Added
July 24	Ireland F2 Futures; Dublin, Ireland; Carpet $25,000; Singles and doubles draws	(Switzerland) Adrien Bossel; 3–6, 6–4, 7–6^{(9–7)}	(United States) Peter Kobelt	(Republic of Ireland) Sam Barry (Republic of Ireland) Simon Carr	(Republic of Ireland) Peter Bothwell (United Kingdom) Ryan James Storrie (France) Rémi Boutillier (Czech Republic) Michal Konečný
July 24	Ireland F2 Futures; Dublin, Ireland; Carpet $25,000; Singles and doubles draws	(Australia) Harry Bourchier (Australia) Daniel Nolan; 6–2, 2–6, [10–3]	(Republic of Ireland) Samuel Bothwell (Australia) Edward Bourchier	(Republic of Ireland) Sam Barry (Republic of Ireland) Simon Carr	(Republic of Ireland) Peter Bothwell (United Kingdom) Ryan James Storrie (France) Rémi Boutillier (Czech Republic) Michal Konečný
July 24	Italy F23 Futures; Pontedera, Italy; Clay $25,000+H; Singles and doubles draws	(India) Sumit Nagal; 6–4, 6–4	(Italy) Andrea Basso	(United Kingdom) Jay Clarke (Sweden) Christian Lindell	(Italy) Andrea Pellegrino (Italy) Simone Roncalli (Italy) Riccardo Bonadio (Netherlands) Igor Sijsling
July 24	Italy F23 Futures; Pontedera, Italy; Clay $25,000+H; Singles and doubles draws	(Italy) Andrea Basso (Italy) Walter Trusendi; 6–2, 6–2	(Italy) Omar Giacalone (Italy) Jacopo Stefanini	(United Kingdom) Jay Clarke (Sweden) Christian Lindell	(Italy) Andrea Pellegrino (Italy) Simone Roncalli (Italy) Riccardo Bonadio (Netherlands) Igor Sijsling
July 24	Spain F23 Futures; Xàtiva, Spain; Clay $25,000; Singles and doubles draws	(Spain) Javier Martí; 6–1, 6–4	(Spain) Eduard Esteve Lobato	(Spain) Gerard Granollers (Spain) Marc Giner	(Italy) Raúl Brancaccio (Switzerland) Vullnet Tashi (Spain) Jaume Pla Malfeito (Portugal) Fred Gil
July 24	Spain F23 Futures; Xàtiva, Spain; Clay $25,000; Singles and doubles draws	(Spain) Marc Fornell Mestres (Spain) Sergio Martos Gornés; 6–3, 6–2	(Spain) Eduard Esteve Lobato (Spain) Gerard Granollers	(Spain) Gerard Granollers (Spain) Marc Giner	(Italy) Raúl Brancaccio (Switzerland) Vullnet Tashi (Spain) Jaume Pla Malfeito (Portugal) Fred Gil
July 24	USA F25 Futures; Champaign, United States; Hard $25,000; Singles and doubles draws	(Australia) Aleksandar Vukic; 7–5, 4–6, 6–2	(United States) Deiton Baughman	(United States) Dennis Nevolo (United States) Jeffrey Schorsch	(Argentina) Santiago Rodríguez Taverna (Mexico) Manuel Sánchez (United States) Ezekiel Clark (Italy) Liam Caruana
July 24	USA F25 Futures; Champaign, United States; Hard $25,000; Singles and doubles draws	(United States) Harrison Adams (United States) Yates Johnson; 6–4, 6–3	(United States) Deiton Baughman (United Kingdom) Farris Fathi Gosea	(United States) Dennis Nevolo (United States) Jeffrey Schorsch	(Argentina) Santiago Rodríguez Taverna (Mexico) Manuel Sánchez (United States) Ezekiel Clark (Italy) Liam Caruana
July 24	Austria F4 Futures; Sankt Pölten, Austria; Clay $15,000; Singles and doubles draws	(Austria) Pascal Brunner; 7–5, 6–1	(Argentina) Felipe Martínez Sarrasague	(Austria) Matthias Haim (Brazil) Daniel Dutra da Silva	(Uruguay) Nicolás Xiviller (Czech Republic) Yvo Panák (Brazil) José Pereira (Germany) Sebastian Prechtel
July 24	Austria F4 Futures; Sankt Pölten, Austria; Clay $15,000; Singles and doubles draws	(Brazil) Daniel Dutra da Silva (Brazil) José Pereira; 6–3, 6–3	(Austria) Matthias Haim (Austria) Philipp Schroll	(Austria) Matthias Haim (Brazil) Daniel Dutra da Silva	(Uruguay) Nicolás Xiviller (Czech Republic) Yvo Panák (Brazil) José Pereira (Germany) Sebastian Prechtel
July 24	Belgium F6 Futures; Duinbergen, Belgium; Clay $15,000; Singles and doubles draws	(Belgium) Julien Cagnina; 6–0, 2–6, 7–5	(Germany) Mats Moraing	(Belgium) Yannick Vandenbulcke (Belgium) Jonas Merckx	(Netherlands) Guy den Heijer (Netherlands) Stephan Gerritsen (Netherlands) Jelle Sels (Netherlands) Tim van Terheijden
July 24	Belgium F6 Futures; Duinbergen, Belgium; Clay $15,000; Singles and doubles draws	(Australia) Adam Taylor (Australia) Jason Taylor; 4–6, 6–4, [10–8]	(Belgium) Michael Geerts (Belgium) Jonas Merckx	(Belgium) Yannick Vandenbulcke (Belgium) Jonas Merckx	(Netherlands) Guy den Heijer (Netherlands) Stephan Gerritsen (Netherlands) Jelle Sels (Netherlands) Tim van Terheijden
July 24	Colombia F2 Futures; Manizales, Colombia; Clay $15,000; Singles and doubles draws	(Argentina) Facundo Argüello; 6–4, 5–7, 6–2	(Colombia) Daniel Elahi Galán	(Argentina) Camilo Ugo Carabelli (Argentina) Facundo Mena	(Colombia) Juan Sebastián Gómez (Peru) Mauricio Echazú (Colombia) Cristian Rodríguez (Colombia) Michael Quintero
July 24	Colombia F2 Futures; Manizales, Colombia; Clay $15,000; Singles and doubles draws	(Argentina) Facundo Mena (Argentina) Camilo Ugo Carabelli; 6–3, 1–6, [10–4]	(Argentina) Facundo Argüello (Argentina) Gonzalo Villanueva	(Argentina) Camilo Ugo Carabelli (Argentina) Facundo Mena	(Colombia) Juan Sebastián Gómez (Peru) Mauricio Echazú (Colombia) Cristian Rodríguez (Colombia) Michael Quintero
July 24	Egypt F22 Futures; Sharm El Sheikh, Egypt; Hard $15,000; Singles and doubles draws	(Egypt) Youssef Hossam; 7–6^{(7–5)}, 6–1	(Egypt) Mazen Osama	(Ukraine) Oleg Khotkov (Zimbabwe) Benjamin Lock	(Egypt) Sherif Sabry (Italy) Filippo Borella (Tunisia) Anis Ghorbel (Italy) Matteo De Vincentis
July 24	Egypt F22 Futures; Sharm El Sheikh, Egypt; Hard $15,000; Singles and doubles draws	(Tunisia) Anis Ghorbel (Benin) Alexis Klégou; 6–0, 6–4	(Portugal) Bernardo Saraiva (Argentina) Eduardo Agustín Torre	(Ukraine) Oleg Khotkov (Zimbabwe) Benjamin Lock	(Egypt) Sherif Sabry (Italy) Filippo Borella (Tunisia) Anis Ghorbel (Italy) Matteo De Vincentis
July 24	Estonia F1 Futures; Pärnu, Estonia; Clay $15,000; Singles and doubles draws	(Estonia) Jürgen Zopp; 6–1, 6–3	(Germany) George von Massow	(Sweden) Patrik Brydolf (Argentina) Matías Franco Descotte	(Brazil) Caio Silva (Latvia) Mārtiņš Podžus (Latvia) Artūrs Lazdiņš (United States) Tom Fawcett
July 24	Estonia F1 Futures; Pärnu, Estonia; Clay $15,000; Singles and doubles draws	(Brazil) Eduardo Dischinger (Brazil) Caio Silva; 7–6^{(7–5)}, 6–7^{(1–7)}, [10–5]	(Norway) Fredrik Ask (Latvia) Miķelis Lībietis	(Sweden) Patrik Brydolf (Argentina) Matías Franco Descotte	(Brazil) Caio Silva (Latvia) Mārtiņš Podžus (Latvia) Artūrs Lazdiņš (United States) Tom Fawcett
July 24	Macedonia F1 Futures; Skopje, Macedonia; Clay $15,000; Singles and doubles draws	(Austria) Maximilian Neuchrist; 6–3, 7–5	(Croatia) Nino Serdarušić	(Austria) David Pichler (North Macedonia) Tomislav Jotovski	(Montenegro) Rrezart Cungu (Italy) Claudio Fortuna (Chinese Taipei) Yang Tsung-hua (United Kingdom) Richard Gabb
July 24	Macedonia F1 Futures; Skopje, Macedonia; Clay $15,000; Singles and doubles draws	(Austria) Maximilian Neuchrist (Austria) David Pichler; 7–6^{(7–1)}, 6–3	(Australia) Dane Propoggia (Chinese Taipei) Yang Tsung-hua	(Austria) David Pichler (North Macedonia) Tomislav Jotovski	(Montenegro) Rrezart Cungu (Italy) Claudio Fortuna (Chinese Taipei) Yang Tsung-hua (United Kingdom) Richard Gabb
July 24	Morocco F2 Futures; Mohammedia, Morocco; Clay $15,000; Singles and doubles draws	(Spain) Carlos Boluda-Purkiss; 6–0, 6–4	(France) Elliot Benchetrit	(Tunisia) Skander Mansouri (Colombia) Juan Manuel Benítez Chavarriaga	(France) Fabien Reboul (France) Florent Diep (Spain) Rafael Mazón-Hernández (Italy) Davide Galoppini
July 24	Morocco F2 Futures; Mohammedia, Morocco; Clay $15,000; Singles and doubles draws	(Colombia) Juan Manuel Benítez Chavarriaga (United States) Raleigh Smith; 6–3, 7–5	(France) Florent Diep (France) Jonathan Kanar	(Tunisia) Skander Mansouri (Colombia) Juan Manuel Benítez Chavarriaga	(France) Fabien Reboul (France) Florent Diep (Spain) Rafael Mazón-Hernández (Italy) Davide Galoppini
July 24	Poland F7 Futures; Mrągowo, Poland; Clay $15,000; Singles and doubles draws	(Poland) Paweł Ciaś; 4–6, 6–3, 6–2	(Ukraine) Olexiy Kolisnyk	(Netherlands) Colin van Beem (Spain) David Jordà Sanchis	(Spain) Pol Toledo Bagué (France) Samuel Bensoussan (Poland) Szymon Walków (Ukraine) Volodymyr Uzhylovskyi
July 24	Poland F7 Futures; Mrągowo, Poland; Clay $15,000; Singles and doubles draws	(Poland) Michał Dembek (Poland) Maciej Smoła; 6–4, 1–6, [10–6]	(France) Samuel Bensoussan (Italy) Fabrizio Ornago	(Netherlands) Colin van Beem (Spain) David Jordà Sanchis	(Spain) Pol Toledo Bagué (France) Samuel Bensoussan (Poland) Szymon Walków (Ukraine) Volodymyr Uzhylovskyi
July 24	Portugal F13 Futures; Idanha-a-Nova, Portugal; Hard $15,000; Singles and doubles draws	(Portugal) Nuno Borges; 7–6^{(7–4)}, 6–4	(Spain) Andrés Artuñedo	(Monaco) Lucas Catarina (France) Maxime Tchoutakian	(France) Clément Larrière (United Kingdom) Jonathan Gray (Portugal) Alexandre Ribeiro (Turkey) Anıl Yüksel
July 24	Portugal F13 Futures; Idanha-a-Nova, Portugal; Hard $15,000; Singles and doubles draws	(Turkey) Altuğ Çelikbilek (Turkey) Anıl Yüksel; 7–5, 6–2	(United Kingdom) Jonathan Gray (France) Clément Larrière	(Monaco) Lucas Catarina (France) Maxime Tchoutakian	(France) Clément Larrière (United Kingdom) Jonathan Gray (Portugal) Alexandre Ribeiro (Turkey) Anıl Yüksel
July 24	Romania F7 Futures; Cluj-Napoca, Romania; Clay $15,000; Singles and doubles draws	(Argentina) Hernán Casanova; 6–3, 6–4	(Italy) Alessandro Petrone	(Bulgaria) Alexandar Lazarov (Italy) Nicola Ghedin	(Romania) Bogdan Borza (Romania) Teodor-Dacian Crăciun (Romania) Bogdan Ionuț Apostol (Sweden) Dragoș Nicolae Mădăraș
July 24	Romania F7 Futures; Cluj-Napoca, Romania; Clay $15,000; Singles and doubles draws	(Romania) Patrick Grigoriu (Romania) Alexandru Jecan; 7–5, 6–2	(Romania) Adrian Barbu (Romania) Petru-Alexandru Luncanu	(Bulgaria) Alexandar Lazarov (Italy) Nicola Ghedin	(Romania) Bogdan Borza (Romania) Teodor-Dacian Crăciun (Romania) Bogdan Ionuț Apostol (Sweden) Dragoș Nicolae Mădăraș
July 24	Russia F4 Futures; Kazan, Russia; Clay $15,000; Singles and doubles draws	(Russia) Pavel Kotov; 7–6^{(7–5)}, 6–2	(Kazakhstan) Denis Yevseyev	(Russia) Denis Matsukevich (Russia) Timur Kiyamov	(Russia) Alexander Igoshin (Uzbekistan) Saida'Lo Saidkarimov (Kyrgyzstan) Daniiar Duldaev (Russia) Markos Kalovelonis
July 24	Russia F4 Futures; Kazan, Russia; Clay $15,000; Singles and doubles draws	(Russia) Richard Muzaev (Russia) Vladimir Polyakov; 6–4, 6–4	(Russia) Aleksandr Lobkov (Russia) Maxim Ratniuk	(Russia) Denis Matsukevich (Russia) Timur Kiyamov	(Russia) Alexander Igoshin (Uzbekistan) Saida'Lo Saidkarimov (Kyrgyzstan) Daniiar Duldaev (Russia) Markos Kalovelonis
July 24	Slovakia F1 Futures; Trnava, Slovakia; Clay $15,000; Singles and doubles draws	(Ukraine) Danylo Kalenichenko; 6–4, 3–6, 6–2	(Russia) Artem Dubrivnyy	(Hungary) Péter Nagy (Japan) Ken Onishi	(Czech Republic) Marek Řeháček (Slovenia) Nik Razboršek (Ukraine) Vitaliy Sachko (Czech Republic) Pavel Nejedlý
July 24	Slovakia F1 Futures; Trnava, Slovakia; Clay $15,000; Singles and doubles draws	(Ukraine) Danylo Kalenichenko (Ukraine) Filipp Kekercheni; 6–2, 5–7, [10–8]	(Slovakia) Lukáš Klein (Slovakia) Patrik Néma	(Hungary) Péter Nagy (Japan) Ken Onishi	(Czech Republic) Marek Řeháček (Slovenia) Nik Razboršek (Ukraine) Vitaliy Sachko (Czech Republic) Pavel Nejedlý
July 24	Turkey F27 Futures; Istanbul, Turkey; Clay $15,000; Singles and doubles draws	(Spain) Guillermo Olaso; 6–4, 3–6, 6–4	(Uruguay) Martín Cuevas	(Brazil) Bruno Sant'Anna (Bulgaria) Dimitar Kuzmanov	(Argentina) Dante Gennaro (Bulgaria) Martin Dimitrov (Italy) Cristian Carli (Turkey) Sarp Ağabigün
July 24	Turkey F27 Futures; Istanbul, Turkey; Clay $15,000; Singles and doubles draws	(Italy) Cristian Carli (Italy) Mirko Cutuli; 6–2, 7–5	(Uruguay) Martín Cuevas (Argentina) Dante Gennaro	(Brazil) Bruno Sant'Anna (Bulgaria) Dimitar Kuzmanov	(Argentina) Dante Gennaro (Bulgaria) Martin Dimitrov (Italy) Cristian Carli (Turkey) Sarp Ağabigün
July 31	Italy F24 Futures; Bolzano, Italy; Clay $25,000; Singles and doubles draws	(Germany) Matthias Bachinger; 6–2, 6–4	(Italy) Andrea Basso	(United Kingdom) Jay Clarke (Sweden) Christian Lindell	(Germany) Robin Kern (Brazil) Bruno Sant'Anna (Italy) Riccardo Balzerani (Italy) Antonio Massara
July 31	Italy F24 Futures; Bolzano, Italy; Clay $25,000; Singles and doubles draws	(Italy) Riccardo Balzerani (Italy) Corrado Summaria; 4–6, 7–6^{(7–3)}, [10–6]	(Italy) Federico Maccari (Italy) Giovanni Oradini	(United Kingdom) Jay Clarke (Sweden) Christian Lindell	(Germany) Robin Kern (Brazil) Bruno Sant'Anna (Italy) Riccardo Balzerani (Italy) Antonio Massara
July 31	Portugal F14 Futures; Porto, Portugal; Clay $25,000; Singles and doubles draws	(Portugal) João Monteiro; 6–2, 7–5	(Spain) Javier Martí	(Slovakia) Filip Horanský (Japan) Makoto Ochi	(Portugal) Fred Gil (France) Corentin Denolly (Spain) Jaume Pla Malfeito (Spain) Sergio Gutiérrez Ferrol
July 31	Portugal F14 Futures; Porto, Portugal; Clay $25,000; Singles and doubles draws	(Portugal) Tiago Cação (Portugal) Nuno Deus; 2–6, 6–4, [10–8]	(Brazil) Rafael Matos (Brazil) Marcelo Zormann	(Slovakia) Filip Horanský (Japan) Makoto Ochi	(Portugal) Fred Gil (France) Corentin Denolly (Spain) Jaume Pla Malfeito (Spain) Sergio Gutiérrez Ferrol
July 31	Romania F8 Futures; Pitești, Romania; Clay $25,000; Singles and doubles draws	(Argentina) Hernán Casanova; 7–6^{(7–1)}, 6–3	(Romania) Adrian Ungur	(France) Geoffrey Blancaneaux (Bulgaria) Alexandar Lazarov	(Uruguay) Martín Cuevas (Italy) Alessandro Petrone (Romania) Nicolae Frunză (Romania) Dragoș Dima
July 31	Romania F8 Futures; Pitești, Romania; Clay $25,000; Singles and doubles draws	(Romania) Bogdan Ionuț Apostol (Sweden) Dragoș Nicolae Mădăraș; 1–6, 6–3, [11–9]	(Australia) Scott Puodziunas (United States) Hunter Reese	(France) Geoffrey Blancaneaux (Bulgaria) Alexandar Lazarov	(Uruguay) Martín Cuevas (Italy) Alessandro Petrone (Romania) Nicolae Frunză (Romania) Dragoș Dima
July 31	Turkey F28 Futures; Erzurum, Turkey; Hard $25,000; Singles and doubles draws	(Monaco) Lucas Catarina; 6–3, 6–3	(Turkey) Anıl Yüksel	(Israel) Igor Smilansky (Turkey) Muhammet Haylaz	(Turkey) Sarp Ağabigün (Turkey) Koray Kırcı (Ukraine) Marat Deviatiarov (Ukraine) Vladyslav Manafov
July 31	Turkey F28 Futures; Erzurum, Turkey; Hard $25,000; Singles and doubles draws	(Ukraine) Marat Deviatiarov (Ukraine) Vladyslav Manafov; 5–7, 6–1, [10–5]	(Israel) Alon Elia (Israel) Igor Smilansky	(Israel) Igor Smilansky (Turkey) Muhammet Haylaz	(Turkey) Sarp Ağabigün (Turkey) Koray Kırcı (Ukraine) Marat Deviatiarov (Ukraine) Vladyslav Manafov
July 31	USA F26 Futures; Decatur, United States; Hard $25,000; Singles and doubles draws	(Italy) Liam Caruana; 7–6^{(7–4)}, 6–1	(Argentina) Genaro Alberto Olivieri	(Burundi) Guy Orly Iradukunda (United States) Cameron Silverman	(Tunisia) Aziz Dougaz (United States) Eric James Johnson (Australia) Harry Bourchier (Israel) Or Ram-Harel
July 31	USA F26 Futures; Decatur, United States; Hard $25,000; Singles and doubles draws	(Moldova) Alexandru Gozun (United States) Nathaniel Lammons; 6–2, 7–6^{(7–2)}	(Australia) Edward Bourchier (Australia) Harry Bourchier	(Burundi) Guy Orly Iradukunda (United States) Cameron Silverman	(Tunisia) Aziz Dougaz (United States) Eric James Johnson (Australia) Harry Bourchier (Israel) Or Ram-Harel
July 31	Austria F5 Futures; Vogau, Austria; Clay $15,000; Singles and doubles draws	(Austria) Dennis Novak; 6–3, 6–2	(Argentina) Franco Agamenone	(Croatia) Mate Delić (Austria) Thomas Statzberger	(Slovenia) Mike Urbanija (Argentina) Felipe Martínez Sarrasague (Argentina) Matías Zukas (Croatia) Franjo Raspudić
July 31	Austria F5 Futures; Vogau, Austria; Clay $15,000; Singles and doubles draws	(Argentina) Franco Agamenone (Argentina) Matías Zukas; 6–4, 6–4	(Argentina) Felipe Martínez Sarrasague (Brazil) Fernando Yamacita	(Croatia) Mate Delić (Austria) Thomas Statzberger	(Slovenia) Mike Urbanija (Argentina) Felipe Martínez Sarrasague (Argentina) Matías Zukas (Croatia) Franjo Raspudić
July 31	Belgium F7 Futures; Brussels, Belgium; Clay $15,000; Singles and doubles draws	(Belgium) Yannick Vandenbulcke; 6–3, 6–4	(Germany) Paul Wörner	(Belgium) Jonas Merckx (Belgium) Omar Salman	(France) Tak Khunn Wang (Netherlands) Gijs Brouwer (Brazil) Ricardo Hocevar (Netherlands) Jelle Sels
July 31	Belgium F7 Futures; Brussels, Belgium; Clay $15,000; Singles and doubles draws	(France) Yanais Laurent (Belgium) Jeroen Vanneste; 6–2, 3–6, [10–6]	(Netherlands) Gijs Brouwer (Netherlands) Jelle Sels	(Belgium) Jonas Merckx (Belgium) Omar Salman	(France) Tak Khunn Wang (Netherlands) Gijs Brouwer (Brazil) Ricardo Hocevar (Netherlands) Jelle Sels
July 31	Colombia F3 Futures; Pereira, Colombia; Clay $15,000; Singles and doubles draws	(Argentina) Facundo Argüello; 6–3, 6–2	(Peru) Mauricio Echazú	(Colombia) Felipe Mantilla (Colombia) Cristian Rodríguez	(Colombia) Daniel Elahi Galán (Brazil) Alexandre Tsuchiya (Venezuela) David Souto (Peru) Jorge Panta
July 31	Colombia F3 Futures; Pereira, Colombia; Clay $15,000; Singles and doubles draws	(Colombia) Daniel Elahi Galán (Dominican Republic) José Olivares; 6–2, 6–3	(Guatemala) Christopher Díaz Figueroa (Mexico) Luis Patiño	(Colombia) Felipe Mantilla (Colombia) Cristian Rodríguez	(Colombia) Daniel Elahi Galán (Brazil) Alexandre Tsuchiya (Venezuela) David Souto (Peru) Jorge Panta
July 31	Egypt F23 Futures; Cairo, Egypt; Clay $15,000; Singles and doubles draws	(France) Thomas Bréchemier; 6–2, 6–4	(Portugal) Bernardo Saraiva	(Egypt) Youssef Hossam (Egypt) Sherif Sabry	(Egypt) Akram El Sallaly (Czech Republic) Filip Duda (Egypt) Issam Haitham Taweel (Spain) Aarón Cortés Alcaraz
July 31	Egypt F23 Futures; Cairo, Egypt; Clay $15,000; Singles and doubles draws	(Czech Republic) Filip Duda (Egypt) Issam Haitham Taweel; 6–4, 2–5, ret.	(Portugal) Bernardo Saraiva (Argentina) Eduardo Agustín Torre	(Egypt) Youssef Hossam (Egypt) Sherif Sabry	(Egypt) Akram El Sallaly (Czech Republic) Filip Duda (Egypt) Issam Haitham Taweel (Spain) Aarón Cortés Alcaraz
July 31	Finland F1 Futures; Kaarina, Finland; Clay $15,000; Singles and doubles draws	(France) Axel Michon; 6–3, 4–6, 6–1	(Sweden) Jonathan Mridha	(Germany) Luca Gelhardt (Estonia) Vladimir Ivanov	(Argentina) Matías Franco Descotte (Estonia) Mattias Siimar (The Bahamas) Justin Roberts (Sweden) Daniel Appelgren
July 31	Finland F1 Futures; Kaarina, Finland; Clay $15,000; Singles and doubles draws	(Russia) Vladimir Polyakov (Russia) Aleksandr Vasilenko; 6–4, 7–5	(Argentina) Matías Franco Descotte (Sweden) Milos Sekulic	(Germany) Luca Gelhardt (Estonia) Vladimir Ivanov	(Argentina) Matías Franco Descotte (Estonia) Mattias Siimar (The Bahamas) Justin Roberts (Sweden) Daniel Appelgren
July 31	Germany F9 Futures; Essen, Germany; Clay $15,000; Singles and doubles draws	(Germany) Jan Choinski; 6–4, 7–6^{(7–5)}	(Brazil) Daniel Dutra da Silva	(Germany) Elmar Ejupovic (Germany) Rudolf Molleker	(Germany) Dominik Böhler (Russia) Philipp Davydenko (Germany) Florian Fallert (France) Ugo Humbert
July 31	Germany F9 Futures; Essen, Germany; Clay $15,000; Singles and doubles draws	(Brazil) Daniel Dutra da Silva (Brazil) José Pereira; 6–2, 6–2	(Germany) Elmar Ejupovic (Germany) Christian Hirschmüller	(Germany) Elmar Ejupovic (Germany) Rudolf Molleker	(Germany) Dominik Böhler (Russia) Philipp Davydenko (Germany) Florian Fallert (France) Ugo Humbert
July 31	Latvia F1 Futures; Riga, Latvia; Clay $15,000; Singles and doubles draws	(Netherlands) Scott Griekspoor; 6–3, 6–2	(Russia) Denis Klok	(France) Pierre Faivre (France) Evan Furness	(Latvia) Mārtiņš Podžus (Netherlands) Marc Dijkhuizen (Brazil) Caio Silva (France) Gabriel Petit
July 31	Latvia F1 Futures; Riga, Latvia; Clay $15,000; Singles and doubles draws	(Estonia) Markus Kerner (Latvia) Miķelis Lībietis; 7–5, 6–4	(Sweden) Patrik Brydolf (Canada) David Volfson	(France) Pierre Faivre (France) Evan Furness	(Latvia) Mārtiņš Podžus (Netherlands) Marc Dijkhuizen (Brazil) Caio Silva (France) Gabriel Petit
July 31	Macedonia F2 Futures; Skopje, Macedonia; Clay $15,000; Singles and doubles draws	(Chinese Taipei) Yang Tsung-hua; 7–6^{(7–2)}, 4–6, 6–3	(Croatia) Nino Serdarušić	(Austria) David Pichler (Hungary) Viktor Filipenkó	(Montenegro) Rrezart Cungu (Croatia) Duje Kekez (Italy) Claudio Fortuna (Austria) Maximilian Neuchrist
July 31	Macedonia F2 Futures; Skopje, Macedonia; Clay $15,000; Singles and doubles draws	(Australia) Dane Propoggia (Chinese Taipei) Yang Tsung-hua; 3–6, 6–4, [10–2]	(Australia) Nicholas Horton (Bosnia and Herzegovina) Aziz Kijametović	(Austria) David Pichler (Hungary) Viktor Filipenkó	(Montenegro) Rrezart Cungu (Croatia) Duje Kekez (Italy) Claudio Fortuna (Austria) Maximilian Neuchrist
July 31	Morocco F3 Futures; Casablanca, Morocco; Clay $15,000; Singles and doubles draws	(Spain) Carlos Boluda-Purkiss; 6–7^{(3–7)}, 6–4, 4–1, ret.	(France) Jonathan Kanar	(France) Hugo Daubias (France) Elliot Benchetrit	(Colombia) Juan Manuel Benítez Chavarriaga (Italy) Nicolò Turchetti (Italy) Davide Galoppini (France) Fabien Reboul
July 31	Morocco F3 Futures; Casablanca, Morocco; Clay $15,000; Singles and doubles draws	(France) Elliot Benchetrit (France) Maxime Hamou; 7–6^{(7–4)}, 6–7^{(2–7)}, [10–5]	(United States) Nick Chappell (Tunisia) Skander Mansouri	(France) Hugo Daubias (France) Elliot Benchetrit	(Colombia) Juan Manuel Benítez Chavarriaga (Italy) Nicolò Turchetti (Italy) Davide Galoppini (France) Fabien Reboul
July 31	Poland F8 Futures; Mrągowo, Poland; Clay $15,000; Singles and doubles draws	(Poland) Maciej Rajski; 6–7^{(5–7)}, 7–5, 6–3	(Poland) Paweł Ciaś	(Poland) Michał Dembek (France) Samuel Bensoussan	(Ukraine) Volodymyr Uzhylovskyi (Ukraine) Olexiy Kolisnyk (United Kingdom) Billy Harris (Spain) Marco Neubau
July 31	Poland F8 Futures; Mrągowo, Poland; Clay $15,000; Singles and doubles draws	(Ukraine) Olexiy Kolisnyk (Ukraine) Oleg Prihodko; 7–6^{(10–8)}, 6–4	(Poland) Michał Dembek (Poland) Maciej Smoła	(Poland) Michał Dembek (France) Samuel Bensoussan	(Ukraine) Volodymyr Uzhylovskyi (Ukraine) Olexiy Kolisnyk (United Kingdom) Billy Harris (Spain) Marco Neubau
July 31	Russia F5 Futures; Kazan, Russia; Clay $15,000; Singles and doubles draws	(Kazakhstan) Denis Yevseyev; 6–4, 6–3	(Russia) Dmitry Mnushkin	(Russia) Pavel Kotov (Russia) Maxim Ratniuk	(Uzbekistan) Saida'Lo Saidkarimov (Russia) Yan Sabanin (Russia) Vladimir Korolev (Russia) Alexander Igoshin
July 31	Russia F5 Futures; Kazan, Russia; Clay $15,000; Singles and doubles draws	(Kyrgyzstan) Daniiar Duldaev (Kazakhstan) Denis Yevseyev; 7–6^{(7–2)}, 6–4	(Russia) Markos Kalovelonis (Russia) Alexander Pavlioutchenkov	(Russia) Pavel Kotov (Russia) Maxim Ratniuk	(Uzbekistan) Saida'Lo Saidkarimov (Russia) Yan Sabanin (Russia) Vladimir Korolev (Russia) Alexander Igoshin
July 31	Slovakia F2 Futures; Piešťany, Slovakia; Clay $15,000; Singles and doubles draws	(France) Grégoire Jacq; 6–4, 3–6, 6–3	(Slovakia) Lukáš Klein	(Slovakia) Patrik Néma (Brazil) Thiago Seyboth Wild	(France) Sébastien Boltz (Slovenia) Nik Razboršek (Hungary) Máté Valkusz (United Kingdom) Ewan Moore
July 31	Slovakia F2 Futures; Piešťany, Slovakia; Clay $15,000; Singles and doubles draws	(France) Sébastien Boltz (France) Grégoire Jacq; 6–4, 6–4	(United Kingdom) Samm Butler (United Kingdom) Andrew Watson	(Slovakia) Patrik Néma (Brazil) Thiago Seyboth Wild	(France) Sébastien Boltz (Slovenia) Nik Razboršek (Hungary) Máté Valkusz (United Kingdom) Ewan Moore
July 31	Thailand F4 Futures; Nonthaburi, Thailand; Hard $15,000; Singles and doubles draws	(Chinese Taipei) Lee Kuan-yi; 6–3, 4–0, ret.	(Japan) Sora Fukuda	(Chinese Taipei) Yu Cheng-yu (United States) Elliott Orkin	(Vietnam) Lý Hoàng Nam (Japan) Shunrou Takeshima (India) Karunuday Singh (Australia) Jeremy Beale
July 31	Thailand F4 Futures; Nonthaburi, Thailand; Hard $15,000; Singles and doubles draws	(Thailand) Patcharapol Kawin (Thailand) Jirat Navasirisomboon; 7–5, 6–0	(Hong Kong) Wong Hong Kit (Hong Kong) Yeung Pak-long	(Chinese Taipei) Yu Cheng-yu (United States) Elliott Orkin	(Vietnam) Lý Hoàng Nam (Japan) Shunrou Takeshima (India) Karunuday Singh (Australia) Jeremy Beale

=== August ===
Week of	Tournament	Winner	Runners-up	Semifinalists	Quarterfinalists
August 7	Italy F25 Futures; Cornaiano, Italy; Clay $25,000+H; Singles and doubles draws	(Egypt) Mohamed Safwat; 6–4, 6–3	(Bosnia and Herzegovina) Tomislav Brkić	(Germany) Jeremy Jahn (Sweden) Christian Lindell	(Germany) Matthias Bachinger (Argentina) Federico Coria (Portugal) Gonçalo Oliveira (Italy) Adelchi Virgili
August 7	Italy F25 Futures; Cornaiano, Italy; Clay $25,000+H; Singles and doubles draws	(Portugal) Gonçalo Oliveira (Netherlands) David Pel; 6–3, 6–2	(Italy) Gianluca Di Nicola (Italy) Lorenzo Sonego	(Germany) Jeremy Jahn (Sweden) Christian Lindell	(Germany) Matthias Bachinger (Argentina) Federico Coria (Portugal) Gonçalo Oliveira (Italy) Adelchi Virgili
August 7	USA F27 Futures; Edwardsville, United States; Hard $25,000; Singles and doubles draws	(Sweden) Gustav Hansson; 6–1, 6–2	(Israel) Or Ram-Harel	(United States) Hunter Callahan (Argentina) Genaro Alberto Olivieri	(Australia) Harry Bourchier (United States) Alfredo Perez (United States) Kevin King (Croatia) Borna Gojo
August 7	USA F27 Futures; Edwardsville, United States; Hard $25,000; Singles and doubles draws	(United States) Hunter Callahan (Sweden) Gustav Hansson; 6–3, 6–4	(United States) Robert Galloway (United States) Alex Lawson	(United States) Hunter Callahan (Argentina) Genaro Alberto Olivieri	(Australia) Harry Bourchier (United States) Alfredo Perez (United States) Kevin King (Croatia) Borna Gojo
August 7	Austria F6 Futures; Innsbruck, Austria; Clay $15,000; Singles and doubles draws	(Austria) Dennis Novak; 6–3, 6–2	(Brazil) Bruno Sant'Anna	(Austria) Alexander Erler (Italy) Alessandro Petrone	(Germany) Christoph Negritu (Italy) Roberto Marcora (Germany) Lukas Ollert (Italy) Filippo Leonardi
August 7	Austria F6 Futures; Innsbruck, Austria; Clay $15,000; Singles and doubles draws	(Austria) Alexander Erler (Austria) Matthias Haim; 6–4, 7–6^{(7–3)}	(Austria) Bernd Kossler (Germany) Lukas Ollert	(Austria) Alexander Erler (Italy) Alessandro Petrone	(Germany) Christoph Negritu (Italy) Roberto Marcora (Germany) Lukas Ollert (Italy) Filippo Leonardi
August 7	Belarus F1 Futures; Minsk, Belarus; Hard $15,000; Singles and doubles draws	(Turkey) Marsel İlhan; 6–1, 6–2	(United Kingdom) Jonathan Gray	(Czech Republic) Tomáš Papík (Kazakhstan) Denis Yevseyev	(Belarus) Pavel Filin (Belarus) Aliaksandr Liaonenka (France) Lény Mitjana (Uzbekistan) Khumoyun Sultanov
August 7	Belarus F1 Futures; Minsk, Belarus; Hard $15,000; Singles and doubles draws	(Ukraine) Vladyslav Manafov (Belarus) Yaraslav Shyla; 6–2, 7–5	(United Kingdom) Jonathan Gray (Croatia) Fran Zvonimir Zgombić	(Czech Republic) Tomáš Papík (Kazakhstan) Denis Yevseyev	(Belarus) Pavel Filin (Belarus) Aliaksandr Liaonenka (France) Lény Mitjana (Uzbekistan) Khumoyun Sultanov
August 7	Belgium F8 Futures; Eupen, Belgium; Clay $15,000; Singles and doubles draws	(France) Antoine Hoang; 6–3, 6–1	(Belgium) Yannick Vandenbulcke	(Belgium) Christopher Heyman (Belgium) Jonas Merckx	(United Kingdom) Billy Harris (United States) Colin Sinclair (Belgium) Germain Gigounon (Netherlands) Jelle Sels
August 7	Belgium F8 Futures; Eupen, Belgium; Clay $15,000; Singles and doubles draws	(United Kingdom) Charles Broom (United States) Colin Sinclair; 4–6, 6–1, [10–5]	(Germany) Tom Schönenberg (Netherlands) Colin van Beem	(Belgium) Christopher Heyman (Belgium) Jonas Merckx	(United Kingdom) Billy Harris (United States) Colin Sinclair (Belgium) Germain Gigounon (Netherlands) Jelle Sels
August 7	Finland F2 Futures; Hyvinkää, Finland; Clay $15,000; Singles and doubles draws	(Belgium) Julien Cagnina; 0–6, 7–5, 6–0	(Estonia) Jürgen Zopp	(Italy) Marco Bortolotti (Sweden) Jonathan Mridha	(Italy) Filippo Baldi (Sweden) André Göransson (Sweden) Karl Friberg (Estonia) Vladimir Ivanov
August 7	Finland F2 Futures; Hyvinkää, Finland; Clay $15,000; Singles and doubles draws	(Sweden) Daniel Appelgren (Sweden) Linus Frost; 6–4, 6–3	(Argentina) Matías Franco Descotte (Estonia) Vladimir Ivanov	(Italy) Marco Bortolotti (Sweden) Jonathan Mridha	(Italy) Filippo Baldi (Sweden) André Göransson (Sweden) Karl Friberg (Estonia) Vladimir Ivanov
August 7	Germany F10 Futures; Wetzlar, Germany; Clay $15,000; Singles and doubles draws	(Germany) Jan Choinski; 7–5, 7–6^{(7–1)}	(Germany) Elmar Ejupovic	(Brazil) Daniel Dutra da Silva (Poland) Maciej Rajski	(Argentina) Juan Ignacio Galarza (France) Maxime Chazal (Germany) Julian Lenz (India) Sumit Nagal
August 7	Germany F10 Futures; Wetzlar, Germany; Clay $15,000; Singles and doubles draws	(Germany) Sebastian Fanselow (Germany) Lukas Storck; 5–7, 6–4, [10–6]	(Germany) Marvin Greven (Germany) Jannis Kahlke	(Brazil) Daniel Dutra da Silva (Poland) Maciej Rajski	(Argentina) Juan Ignacio Galarza (France) Maxime Chazal (Germany) Julian Lenz (India) Sumit Nagal
August 7	Portugal F15 Futures; Caldas da Rainha, Portugal; Clay $15,000; Singles and doubles draws	(Spain) Sergio Gutiérrez Ferrol; 6–4, 6–0	(Portugal) João Monteiro	(Brazil) Rafael Matos (Russia) Mikhail Korovin	(Spain) Jaume Pla Malfeito (Japan) Makoto Ochi (Brazil) Marcelo Zormann (United Kingdom) Edward Corrie
August 7	Portugal F15 Futures; Caldas da Rainha, Portugal; Clay $15,000; Singles and doubles draws	(Spain) Sergio Gutiérrez Ferrol (Spain) Jaume Pla Malfeito; 7–5, 6–2	(Spain) Paco Climent Gregori (Russia) Mikhail Korovin	(Brazil) Rafael Matos (Russia) Mikhail Korovin	(Spain) Jaume Pla Malfeito (Japan) Makoto Ochi (Brazil) Marcelo Zormann (United Kingdom) Edward Corrie
August 7	Romania F9 Futures; Bucharest, Romania; Clay $15,000; Singles and doubles draws	(Bolivia) Hugo Dellien; 6–2, 6–4	(Romania) Dragoș Dima	(Switzerland) Antoine Bellier (France) Maxime Tabatruong	(Uruguay) Martín Cuevas (Romania) Bogdan Ionuț Apostol (Sweden) Dragoș Nicolae Mădăraș (Romania) Adrian Ungur
August 7	Romania F9 Futures; Bucharest, Romania; Clay $15,000; Singles and doubles draws	(Romania) Adrian Barbu (Romania) Florin Mergea; 6–2, 4–6, [13–11]	(Bolivia) Hugo Dellien (Bolivia) Federico Zeballos	(Switzerland) Antoine Bellier (France) Maxime Tabatruong	(Uruguay) Martín Cuevas (Romania) Bogdan Ionuț Apostol (Sweden) Dragoș Nicolae Mădăraș (Romania) Adrian Ungur
August 7	Russia F6 Futures; Moscow, Russia; Clay $15,000; Singles and doubles draws	(Russia) Ivan Gakhov; 6–3, 6–3	(Russia) Artur Shakhnubaryan	(Russia) Pavel Kotov (Russia) Anton Zaitcev	(Russia) Timur Kiyamov (Russia) Alexander Zhurbin (Russia) Kristian Lozan (Russia) Mikhail Elgin
August 7	Russia F6 Futures; Moscow, Russia; Clay $15,000; Singles and doubles draws	(Russia) Ivan Gakhov (Russia) Alexander Pavlioutchenkov; 6–4, 6–3	(Russia) Richard Muzaev (Russia) Vladimir Polyakov	(Russia) Pavel Kotov (Russia) Anton Zaitcev	(Russia) Timur Kiyamov (Russia) Alexander Zhurbin (Russia) Kristian Lozan (Russia) Mikhail Elgin
August 7	Serbia F1 Futures; Novi Sad, Serbia; Clay $15,000; Singles and doubles draws	(Croatia) Nino Serdarušić; 6–1, 6–4	(Italy) Antonio Massara	(Italy) Riccardo Bonadio (Spain) David Jordà Sanchis	(Argentina) Dante Gennaro (Hungary) Dávid Szintai (Italy) Fabrizio Ornago (Serbia) Milan Drinić
August 7	Serbia F1 Futures; Novi Sad, Serbia; Clay $15,000; Singles and doubles draws	(Australia) Dane Propoggia (Australia) Scott Puodziunas; 6–3, 7–5	(Hungary) Gábor Borsos (Croatia) Nino Serdarušić	(Italy) Riccardo Bonadio (Spain) David Jordà Sanchis	(Argentina) Dante Gennaro (Hungary) Dávid Szintai (Italy) Fabrizio Ornago (Serbia) Milan Drinić
August 7	Slovakia F3 Futures; Bratislava, Slovakia; Clay $15,000; Singles and doubles draws	(Slovakia) Filip Horanský; 6–4, 6–4	(Slovakia) Lukáš Klein	(Ukraine) Danylo Kalenichenko (Slovenia) Mike Urbanija	(Argentina) Juan Pablo Ficovich (Slovakia) Tomáš Líška (France) Samuel Bensoussan (Czech Republic) David Poljak
August 7	Slovakia F3 Futures; Bratislava, Slovakia; Clay $15,000; Singles and doubles draws	(Ukraine) Olexiy Kolisnyk (Ukraine) Oleg Prihodko; 7–6^{(7–5)}, 7–5	(Slovakia) Filip Horanský (Slovakia) Marek Semjan	(Ukraine) Danylo Kalenichenko (Slovenia) Mike Urbanija	(Argentina) Juan Pablo Ficovich (Slovakia) Tomáš Líška (France) Samuel Bensoussan (Czech Republic) David Poljak
August 7	Thailand F5 Futures; Nonthaburi, Thailand; Hard $15,000; Singles and doubles draws	(Japan) Sho Katayama; 7–6^{(9–7)}, 4–6, 6–3	(Chinese Taipei) Lee Kuan-yi	(India) Karunuday Singh (Thailand) Pruchya Isaro	(Italy) Lorenzo Frigerio (Japan) Soichiro Moritani (Chinese Taipei) Lo Chien-hsun (Australia) Jacob Grills
August 7	Thailand F5 Futures; Nonthaburi, Thailand; Hard $15,000; Singles and doubles draws	(Japan) Sora Fukuda (Japan) Sho Katayama; 5–7, 7–5, [10–8]	(Thailand) Pruchya Isaro (India) Karunuday Singh	(India) Karunuday Singh (Thailand) Pruchya Isaro	(Italy) Lorenzo Frigerio (Japan) Soichiro Moritani (Chinese Taipei) Lo Chien-hsun (Australia) Jacob Grills
August 7	Turkey F29 Futures; Mersin, Turkey; Clay $15,000; Singles and doubles draws	(Chinese Taipei) Yang Tsung-hua; 6–1, 6–0	(France) Thomas Bréchemier	(Russia) Ivan Nedelko (Spain) Fernando Bogajo	(Croatia) Neven Krivokuća (Israel) Alon Elia (Turkey) Sarp Ağabigün (Italy) Eros Siringo
August 7	Turkey F29 Futures; Mersin, Turkey; Clay $15,000; Singles and doubles draws	(Serbia) Nikola Ćaćić (Portugal) Bernardo Saraiva; 6–2, 3–6, [11–9]	(Russia) Bogdan Bobrov (Serbia) Goran Marković	(Russia) Ivan Nedelko (Spain) Fernando Bogajo	(Croatia) Neven Krivokuća (Israel) Alon Elia (Turkey) Sarp Ağabigün (Italy) Eros Siringo
August 14	Poland F9 Futures; Bydgoszcz, Poland; Clay $25,000; Singles and doubles draws	(Germany) Mats Moraing; 6–2, 7–5	(Australia) Aleksandar Vukic	(Netherlands) Boy Westerhof (Poland) Hubert Hurkacz	(Spain) Carlos Gómez-Herrera (Poland) Adrian Andrzejczuk (Poland) Adam Chadaj (Czech Republic) Jan Mertl
August 14	Poland F9 Futures; Bydgoszcz, Poland; Clay $25,000; Singles and doubles draws	(Poland) Michał Dembek (Poland) Hubert Hurkacz; 6–2, 6–7^{(9–11)}, [10–6]	(Poland) Karol Drzewiecki (Poland) Maciej Smoła	(Netherlands) Boy Westerhof (Poland) Hubert Hurkacz	(Spain) Carlos Gómez-Herrera (Poland) Adrian Andrzejczuk (Poland) Adam Chadaj (Czech Republic) Jan Mertl
August 14	Belarus F2 Futures; Minsk, Belarus; Hard $15,000; Singles and doubles draws	(Turkey) Marsel İlhan; 6–3, 6–3	(Belarus) Dzmitry Zhyrmont	(Belarus) Yaraslav Shyla (Ukraine) Marat Deviatiarov	(Belarus) Mikalai Haliak (Ukraine) Vadym Ursu (Ukraine) Vladyslav Manafov (United Kingdom) Lloyd Glasspool
August 14	Belarus F2 Futures; Minsk, Belarus; Hard $15,000; Singles and doubles draws	(France) Maxime Cressy (France) Ugo Humbert; 4–6, 6–3, [10–5]	(Belarus) Ivan Liutarevich (Ukraine) Vadym Ursu	(Belarus) Yaraslav Shyla (Ukraine) Marat Deviatiarov	(Belarus) Mikalai Haliak (Ukraine) Vadym Ursu (Ukraine) Vladyslav Manafov (United Kingdom) Lloyd Glasspool
August 14	Belgium F9 Futures; Koksijde, Belgium; Clay $15,000; Singles and doubles draws	(Belgium) Julien Cagnina; 7–5, 3–6, 7–6^{(7–3)}	(France) Antoine Hoang	(Belgium) Niels Desein (Belgium) Jeroen Vanneste	(Chile) Marcelo Plaza (Belgium) Jonas Merckx (Belgium) Omar Salman (France) Tak Khunn Wang
August 14	Belgium F9 Futures; Koksijde, Belgium; Clay $15,000; Singles and doubles draws	(France) Antoine Hoang (France) Tak Khunn Wang; 6–1, 3–6, [10–8]	(Belgium) Romain Barbosa (Belgium) Omar Salman	(Belgium) Niels Desein (Belgium) Jeroen Vanneste	(Chile) Marcelo Plaza (Belgium) Jonas Merckx (Belgium) Omar Salman (France) Tak Khunn Wang
August 14	Finland F3 Futures; Helsinki, Finland; Clay $15,000; Singles and doubles draws	(Estonia) Jürgen Zopp; 6–4, 6–0	(Italy) Filippo Baldi	(Sweden) Karl Friberg (Italy) Roberto Marcora	(Italy) Nicolò Turchetti (Sweden) Jonas Eriksson Ziverts (Sweden) Daniel Appelgren (Sweden) Patrik Brydolf
August 14	Finland F3 Futures; Helsinki, Finland; Clay $15,000; Singles and doubles draws	(Italy) Filippo Baldi (Italy) Marco Bortolotti; 6–4, 7–6^{(7–5)}	(Netherlands) Marc Dijkhuizen (Netherlands) Bart Stevens	(Sweden) Karl Friberg (Italy) Roberto Marcora	(Italy) Nicolò Turchetti (Sweden) Jonas Eriksson Ziverts (Sweden) Daniel Appelgren (Sweden) Patrik Brydolf
August 14	Germany F11 Futures; Karlsruhe, Germany; Clay $15,000; Singles and doubles draws	(Germany) Jan Choinski; 6–2, 6–4	(Hungary) Máté Valkusz	(Germany) Sebastian Fanselow (Germany) Benjamin Hassan	(Austria) Daniel Kopeinigg (Germany) Peter Heller (Germany) Florian Fallert (Australia) Alexei Popyrin
August 14	Germany F11 Futures; Karlsruhe, Germany; Clay $15,000; Singles and doubles draws	(Germany) Florian Fallert (Germany) Peter Heller; 6–2, 6–7^{(6–8)}, [10–7]	(France) Dan Added (France) Hugo Daubias	(Germany) Sebastian Fanselow (Germany) Benjamin Hassan	(Austria) Daniel Kopeinigg (Germany) Peter Heller (Germany) Florian Fallert (Australia) Alexei Popyrin
August 14	Netherlands F5 Futures; Oldenzaal, Netherlands; Clay $15,000; Singles and doubles draws	(Netherlands) Scott Griekspoor; 6–4, 6–1	(Netherlands) Botic van de Zandschulp	(Germany) Pascal Meis (France) Samuel Bensoussan	(Germany) Christoph Negritu (Netherlands) Bart van den Berg (Netherlands) Guy den Heijer (Netherlands) Jelle Sels
August 14	Netherlands F5 Futures; Oldenzaal, Netherlands; Clay $15,000; Singles and doubles draws	(Netherlands) Scott Griekspoor (Germany) Louis Wessels; 6–3, 6–0	(Netherlands) Glenn Smits (Netherlands) Boy Vergeer	(Germany) Pascal Meis (France) Samuel Bensoussan	(Germany) Christoph Negritu (Netherlands) Bart van den Berg (Netherlands) Guy den Heijer (Netherlands) Jelle Sels
August 14	Portugal F16 Futures; Sintra, Portugal; Hard $15,000; Singles and doubles draws	(Spain) David Pérez Sanz; 7–5, 7–5	(France) Jonathan Kanar	(France) David Guez (United Kingdom) Ryan Peniston	(Spain) Javier Pulgar-García (Guatemala) Wilfredo González (Spain) Jaime Pulgar-García (Portugal) Francisco Cabral
August 14	Portugal F16 Futures; Sintra, Portugal; Hard $15,000; Singles and doubles draws	(Portugal) Nuno Deus (Portugal) Bernardo Saraiva; 7–5, 6–2	(Kuwait) Abdullah Maqdes (Spain) Javier Pulgar-García	(France) David Guez (United Kingdom) Ryan Peniston	(Spain) Javier Pulgar-García (Guatemala) Wilfredo González (Spain) Jaime Pulgar-García (Portugal) Francisco Cabral
August 14	Romania F10 Futures; Bucharest, Romania; Clay $15,000; Singles and doubles draws	(Italy) Pietro Licciardi; 3–6, 6–4, 6–1	(France) Florent Diep	(Bolivia) Federico Zeballos (Israel) Ben Patael	(France) Maxime Chazal (Romania) Vasile Antonescu (France) Maxime Tabatruong (Romania) Petru-Alexandru Luncanu
August 14	Romania F10 Futures; Bucharest, Romania; Clay $15,000; Singles and doubles draws	(Romania) Victor-Mugurel Anagnastopol (Romania) Victor Vlad Cornea; 7–5, 7–6^{(7–1)}	(Australia) Nathan Eshmade (Netherlands) Sem Verbeek	(Bolivia) Federico Zeballos (Israel) Ben Patael	(France) Maxime Chazal (Romania) Vasile Antonescu (France) Maxime Tabatruong (Romania) Petru-Alexandru Luncanu
August 14	Russia F7 Futures; Moscow, Russia; Clay $15,000; Singles and doubles draws	(Russia) Evgeny Karlovskiy; 6–2, 4–0, ret.	(Russia) Mikhail Elgin	(Russia) Artur Shakhnubaryan (Russia) Anton Zaitcev	(Russia) Alexander Zhurbin (Russia) Kristian Lozan (Russia) Shalva Dzhanashia (Russia) Artem Dubrivnyy
August 14	Russia F7 Futures; Moscow, Russia; Clay $15,000; Singles and doubles draws	(Russia) Ivan Davydov (Russia) Vladimir Polyakov; 6–3, 3–6, [10–5]	(Russia) Ivan Kalinin (Russia) Kirill Kivattsev	(Russia) Artur Shakhnubaryan (Russia) Anton Zaitcev	(Russia) Alexander Zhurbin (Russia) Kristian Lozan (Russia) Shalva Dzhanashia (Russia) Artem Dubrivnyy
August 14	Serbia F2 Futures; Novi Sad, Serbia; Clay $15,000; Singles and doubles draws	(Bosnia and Herzegovina) Tomislav Brkić; 6–2, 6–7^{(5–7)}, 6–3	(Croatia) Nino Serdarušić	(Bulgaria) Dimitar Kuzmanov (United States) Nathan Pasha	(Bosnia and Herzegovina) Nerman Fatić (France) Grégoire Jacq (Brazil) João Menezes (Serbia) Dejan Katić
August 14	Serbia F2 Futures; Novi Sad, Serbia; Clay $15,000; Singles and doubles draws	(Australia) Dane Propoggia (Australia) Scott Puodziunas; 7–6^{(10–8)}, 5–7, [11–9]	(Croatia) Ivan Sabanov (Croatia) Matej Sabanov	(Bulgaria) Dimitar Kuzmanov (United States) Nathan Pasha	(Bosnia and Herzegovina) Nerman Fatić (France) Grégoire Jacq (Brazil) João Menezes (Serbia) Dejan Katić
August 14	Spain F25 Futures; Vigo, Spain; Clay $15,000; Singles and doubles draws	(Spain) Marc Giner; 6–2, 4–6, 7–6^{(8–6)}	(Brazil) Rafael Matos	(Brazil) Marcelo Zormann (Spain) Jaume Pla Malfeito	(Spain) Eduard Esteve Lobato (Spain) Alberto Colás Sánchez (Russia) Mikhail Korovin (Spain) Javier Barranco Cosano
August 14	Spain F25 Futures; Vigo, Spain; Clay $15,000; Singles and doubles draws	(Brazil) Rafael Matos (Brazil) Marcelo Zormann; 6–3, 7–6^{(7–4)}	(Spain) Marc Fornell Mestres (Spain) Marc Giner	(Brazil) Marcelo Zormann (Spain) Jaume Pla Malfeito	(Spain) Eduard Esteve Lobato (Spain) Alberto Colás Sánchez (Russia) Mikhail Korovin (Spain) Javier Barranco Cosano
August 14	Switzerland F3 Futures; Collonge-Bellerive, Switzerland; Clay $15,000; Singles and doubles draws	(Slovakia) Filip Horanský; 6–2, 6–0	(Bulgaria) Alexandar Lazov	(Germany) Lukas Ollert (Japan) Hiroyasu Ehara	(Switzerland) Antoine Bellier (Italy) Marco Miceli (Italy) Davide Galoppini (Colombia) Juan Manuel Benítez Chavarriaga
August 14	Switzerland F3 Futures; Collonge-Bellerive, Switzerland; Clay $15,000; Singles and doubles draws	(Switzerland) Luca Margaroli (Switzerland) Louroi Martinez; 6–4, 6–3	(Switzerland) Jakub Paul (Switzerland) Damien Wenger	(Germany) Lukas Ollert (Japan) Hiroyasu Ehara	(Switzerland) Antoine Bellier (Italy) Marco Miceli (Italy) Davide Galoppini (Colombia) Juan Manuel Benítez Chavarriaga
August 14	Thailand F6 Futures; Nonthaburi, Thailand; Hard $15,000; Singles and doubles draws	(Australia) Jacob Grills; 7–6^{(7–4)}, 7–5	(India) Vijay Sundar Prashanth	(Australia) Blake Ellis (Thailand) Pruchya Isaro	(Japan) Sho Katayama (Indonesia) David Agung Susanto (Germany) Sami Reinwein (Thailand) Wishaya Trongcharoenchaikul
August 14	Thailand F6 Futures; Nonthaburi, Thailand; Hard $15,000; Singles and doubles draws	(Thailand) Pruchya Isaro (Japan) Sho Katayama; 6–4, 2–6, [10–8]	(India) Vinayak Sharma Kaza (India) Vijay Sundar Prashanth	(Australia) Blake Ellis (Thailand) Pruchya Isaro	(Japan) Sho Katayama (Indonesia) David Agung Susanto (Germany) Sami Reinwein (Thailand) Wishaya Trongcharoenchaikul
August 14	Turkey F30 Futures; Istanbul, Turkey; Clay $15,000; Singles and doubles draws	(Italy) Alessandro Bega; 7–6^{(7–3)}, 3–6, 7–5	(Chinese Taipei) Yang Tsung-hua	(Norway) Viktor Durasovic (Bulgaria) Gabriel Donev	(Turkey) Mert Alkaya (Austria) Alexander Erler (Argentina) Matías Zukas (Italy) Fabrizio Ornago
August 14	Turkey F30 Futures; Istanbul, Turkey; Clay $15,000; Singles and doubles draws	(Argentina) Franco Agamenone (Argentina) Matías Zukas; 6–2, 1–6, [17–15]	(Spain) Sergio Martos Gornés (Spain) Pol Toledo Bagué	(Norway) Viktor Durasovic (Bulgaria) Gabriel Donev	(Turkey) Mert Alkaya (Austria) Alexander Erler (Argentina) Matías Zukas (Italy) Fabrizio Ornago
August 21	Poland F10 Futures; Poznań, Poland; Clay $25,000; Singles and doubles draws	(Germany) Mats Moraing; 7–6^{(7–5)}, 6–4	(Czech Republic) Zdeněk Kolář	(Poland) Michał Dembek (India) Sumit Nagal	(Belgium) Yannick Vandenbulcke (Estonia) Vladimir Ivanov (Ukraine) Artem Smirnov (Poland) Hubert Hurkacz
August 21	Poland F10 Futures; Poznań, Poland; Clay $25,000; Singles and doubles draws	(Ukraine) Artem Smirnov (Ukraine) Volodymyr Uzhylovskyi; 6–4, 6–2	(Poland) Michał Dembek (Poland) Hubert Hurkacz	(Poland) Michał Dembek (India) Sumit Nagal	(Belgium) Yannick Vandenbulcke (Estonia) Vladimir Ivanov (Ukraine) Artem Smirnov (Poland) Hubert Hurkacz
August 21	Spain F26 Futures; Santander, Spain; Clay $25,000; Singles and doubles draws	(Spain) Pedro Martínez; 6–3, 6–2	(Spain) Marc Giner	(France) Fabien Reboul (Argentina) Pedro Cachin	(Spain) Daniel Gimeno Traver (France) Théo Fournerie (Brazil) Rafael Matos (Spain) Jaime Fermosell
August 21	Spain F26 Futures; Santander, Spain; Clay $25,000; Singles and doubles draws	(Spain) Marc Giner (Spain) Jaume Pla Malfeito; 6–4, 6–7^{(1–7)}, [10–7]	(Argentina) Pedro Cachin (Spain) Juan Lizariturry	(France) Fabien Reboul (Argentina) Pedro Cachin	(Spain) Daniel Gimeno Traver (France) Théo Fournerie (Brazil) Rafael Matos (Spain) Jaime Fermosell
August 21	Turkey F31 Futures; Istanbul, Turkey; Clay $25,000; Singles and doubles draws	(Argentina) Patricio Heras; 3–6, 6–1, 6–4	(Russia) Ivan Nedelko	(Netherlands) Tallon Griekspoor (Bulgaria) Dimitar Kuzmanov	(Austria) Alexander Erler (Bosnia and Herzegovina) Tomislav Brkić (India) Sasikumar Mukund (Spain) Javier Martí
August 21	Turkey F31 Futures; Istanbul, Turkey; Clay $25,000; Singles and doubles draws	(Netherlands) Sidney de Boer (Netherlands) Tallon Griekspoor; 6–4, 7–6^{(7–3)}	(Tunisia) Anis Ghorbel (Slovakia) Filip Horanský	(Netherlands) Tallon Griekspoor (Bulgaria) Dimitar Kuzmanov	(Austria) Alexander Erler (Bosnia and Herzegovina) Tomislav Brkić (India) Sasikumar Mukund (Spain) Javier Martí
August 21	Argentina F4 Futures; Rosario, Argentina; Clay $15,000; Singles and doubles draws	(Argentina) Hernán Casanova; 6–2, 6–2	(Brazil) Nicolas Santos	(Argentina) Camilo Ugo Carabelli (Argentina) Tomás Lipovšek Puches	(Chile) Bastián Malla (Brazil) Oscar José Gutierrez (Argentina) Nicolás Alberto Arreche (Argentina) Tomás Martín Etcheverry
August 21	Argentina F4 Futures; Rosario, Argentina; Clay $15,000; Singles and doubles draws	(Argentina) Tomás Lipovšek Puches (Argentina) Gonzalo Villanueva; 6–3, 6–7^{(5–7)}, [10–6]	(Argentina) Maximiliano Estévez (Argentina) Valentín Florez	(Argentina) Camilo Ugo Carabelli (Argentina) Tomás Lipovšek Puches	(Chile) Bastián Malla (Brazil) Oscar José Gutierrez (Argentina) Nicolás Alberto Arreche (Argentina) Tomás Martín Etcheverry
August 21	Belarus F3 Futures; Minsk, Belarus; Hard $15,000; Singles and doubles draws	(Belarus) Dzmitry Zhyrmont; 7–6^{(7–4)}, 6–2	(France) Hugo Grenier	(United Kingdom) Lloyd Glasspool (Belarus) Yaraslav Shyla	(Turkey) Marsel İlhan (Belarus) Ivan Liutarevich (United Kingdom) Jonathan Gray (Monaco) Lucas Catarina
August 21	Belarus F3 Futures; Minsk, Belarus; Hard $15,000; Singles and doubles draws	(Ukraine) Vladyslav Manafov (Belarus) Yaraslav Shyla; 6–3, 2–6, [10–4]	(Belarus) Ivan Liutarevich (Ukraine) Vadym Ursu	(United Kingdom) Lloyd Glasspool (Belarus) Yaraslav Shyla	(Turkey) Marsel İlhan (Belarus) Ivan Liutarevich (United Kingdom) Jonathan Gray (Monaco) Lucas Catarina
August 21	Belgium F10 Futures; Lambermont, Belgium; Clay $15,000; Singles and doubles draws	(Belgium) Julien Cagnina; 6–1, 6–7^{(3–7)}, 6–3	(Belgium) Clément Geens	(Belgium) Yannik Reuter (Belgium) Jeroen Vanneste	(Belgium) Christopher Heyman (Russia) Philipp Davydenko (Tunisia) Aziz Dougaz (Benin) Alexis Klégou
August 21	Belgium F10 Futures; Lambermont, Belgium; Clay $15,000; Singles and doubles draws	(Germany) Tom Schönenberg (Belgium) Jeroen Vanneste; 6–2, 6–7^{(4–7)}, [10–6]	(Belgium) Germain Gigounon (Belgium) Simon Stevens	(Belgium) Yannik Reuter (Belgium) Jeroen Vanneste	(Belgium) Christopher Heyman (Russia) Philipp Davydenko (Tunisia) Aziz Dougaz (Benin) Alexis Klégou
August 21	Germany F12 Futures; Überlingen, Germany; Clay $15,000; Singles and doubles draws	(Switzerland) Adrian Bodmer; 7–6^{(7–5)}, 6–3	(Germany) Louis Wessels	(Germany) Peter Torebko (Austria) Matthias Haim	(Germany) Marc Sieber (Germany) Marvin Möller (Germany) Peter Heller (Germany) Dominik Böhler
August 21	Germany F12 Futures; Überlingen, Germany; Clay $15,000; Singles and doubles draws	(Germany) Rene Schulte (Germany) Peter Torebko; 6–2, 6–4	(Italy) Erik Crepaldi (Germany) Peter Heller	(Germany) Peter Torebko (Austria) Matthias Haim	(Germany) Marc Sieber (Germany) Marvin Möller (Germany) Peter Heller (Germany) Dominik Böhler
August 21	Hungary F6 Futures; Budapest, Hungary; Clay $15,000; Singles and doubles draws	(Spain) Enrique López Pérez; 6–3, 6–0	(Hungary) Zsombor Piros	(Hungary) Attila Balázs (Hungary) Péter Nagy	(Belgium) Niels Desein (Sweden) Markus Eriksson (Austria) Pascal Brunner (Hungary) Dávid Szintai
August 21	Hungary F6 Futures; Budapest, Hungary; Clay $15,000; Singles and doubles draws	(Czech Republic) Petr Nouza (Czech Republic) David Škoch; 6–4, 6–0	(Sweden) Patrik Brydolf (Sweden) Markus Eriksson	(Hungary) Attila Balázs (Hungary) Péter Nagy	(Belgium) Niels Desein (Sweden) Markus Eriksson (Austria) Pascal Brunner (Hungary) Dávid Szintai
August 21	Italy F26 Futures; Cuneo, Italy; Clay $15,000; Singles and doubles draws	(Italy) Cristian Carli; 2–6, 7–6^{(7–5)}, 7–6^{(7–4)}	(Italy) Andrea Basso	(Italy) Adelchi Virgili (Russia) Alexander Zhurbin	(Italy) Davide Galoppini (France) Baptiste Crepatte (Italy) Pietro Rondoni (Italy) Andrea Bolla
August 21	Italy F26 Futures; Cuneo, Italy; Clay $15,000; Singles and doubles draws	(Italy) Davide Della Tommasina (Italy) Giovanni Fonio; 6–4, 2–6, [12–10]	(Italy) Federico Maccari (Italy) Francesco Moncagatto	(Italy) Adelchi Virgili (Russia) Alexander Zhurbin	(Italy) Davide Galoppini (France) Baptiste Crepatte (Italy) Pietro Rondoni (Italy) Andrea Bolla
August 21	Netherlands F6 Futures; Rotterdam, Netherlands; Clay $15,000; Singles and doubles draws	(Netherlands) Thiemo de Bakker; 6–2, 6–3	(Netherlands) Gijs Brouwer	(Netherlands) Boy Westerhof (Slovenia) Tom Kočevar-Dešman	(Netherlands) Bart van den Berg (Netherlands) Jelle Sels (Netherlands) Scott Griekspoor (Netherlands) Botic van de Zandschulp
August 21	Netherlands F6 Futures; Rotterdam, Netherlands; Clay $15,000; Singles and doubles draws	(Netherlands) Botic van de Zandschulp (Netherlands) Boy Westerhof; 6–1, 6–3	(United States) Nick Chappell (United States) Hunter Reese	(Netherlands) Boy Westerhof (Slovenia) Tom Kočevar-Dešman	(Netherlands) Bart van den Berg (Netherlands) Jelle Sels (Netherlands) Scott Griekspoor (Netherlands) Botic van de Zandschulp
August 21	Portugal F17 Futures; Sintra, Portugal; Hard $15,000; Singles and doubles draws	(Portugal) João Monteiro; 7–6^{(7–3)}, 6–2	(Portugal) Fred Gil	(Turkey) Altuğ Çelikbilek (Spain) Carlos Boluda-Purkiss	(Spain) Pablo Vivero González (United Kingdom) Ryan Peniston (France) Yanais Laurent (France) David Guez
August 21	Portugal F17 Futures; Sintra, Portugal; Hard $15,000; Singles and doubles draws	(United Kingdom) Edward Corrie (United Kingdom) Marcus Willis; 6–1, 6–4	(France) Yanais Laurent (France) Maxime Tchoutakian	(Turkey) Altuğ Çelikbilek (Spain) Carlos Boluda-Purkiss	(Spain) Pablo Vivero González (United Kingdom) Ryan Peniston (France) Yanais Laurent (France) David Guez
August 21	Romania F11 Futures; Chitila, Romania; Clay $15,000; Singles and doubles draws	(Romania) Dragoș Dima; 7–5, 6–3	(Romania) Bogdan Borza	(Uruguay) Santiago Maresca (Argentina) Franco Agamenone	(Czech Republic) Jan Mertl (Romania) Andrei Ștefan Apostol (Romania) Vasile Antonescu (Chile) Laslo Urrutia Fuentes
August 21	Romania F11 Futures; Chitila, Romania; Clay $15,000; Singles and doubles draws	(Argentina) Franco Agamenone (Romania) Patrick Grigoriu; 2–6, 6–2, [10–8]	(Romania) Adrian Barbu (Romania) Florin Mergea	(Uruguay) Santiago Maresca (Argentina) Franco Agamenone	(Czech Republic) Jan Mertl (Romania) Andrei Ștefan Apostol (Romania) Vasile Antonescu (Chile) Laslo Urrutia Fuentes
August 21	Serbia F3 Futures; Subotica, Serbia; Clay $15,000; Singles and doubles draws	(Austria) Dennis Novak; 6–3, 6–7^{(4–7)}, 6–2	(Italy) Gian Marco Moroni	(Croatia) Duje Kekez (Czech Republic) Jaroslav Pospíšil	(Austria) Thomas Statzberger (Croatia) Domagoj Bilješko (Czech Republic) Tadeáš Paroulek (United States) Nathan Pasha
August 21	Serbia F3 Futures; Subotica, Serbia; Clay $15,000; Singles and doubles draws	(Czech Republic) Vít Kopřiva (Czech Republic) Jaroslav Pospíšil; 6–2, 3–6, [10–6]	(Austria) Dennis Novak (Austria) Thomas Statzberger	(Croatia) Duje Kekez (Czech Republic) Jaroslav Pospíšil	(Austria) Thomas Statzberger (Croatia) Domagoj Bilješko (Czech Republic) Tadeáš Paroulek (United States) Nathan Pasha
August 21	Switzerland F4 Futures; Neuchâtel, Switzerland; Clay $15,000; Singles and doubles draws	(Germany) Tim Pütz; 6–2, 6–2	(Japan) Hiroyasu Ehara	(Bulgaria) Alexandar Lazov (Switzerland) Adrien Bossel	(Germany) Tobias Simon (United States) Jake Douglas (France) Mick Lescure (France) Rémi Boutillier
August 21	Switzerland F4 Futures; Neuchâtel, Switzerland; Clay $15,000; Singles and doubles draws	(France) Rémi Boutillier (France) Hugo Voljacques; 6–3, 6–4	(Switzerland) Rémy Bertola (Switzerland) Jakub Paul	(Bulgaria) Alexandar Lazov (Switzerland) Adrien Bossel	(Germany) Tobias Simon (United States) Jake Douglas (France) Mick Lescure (France) Rémi Boutillier
August 28	Canada F5 Futures; Calgary, Canada; Hard $25,000; Singles and doubles draws	(United States) Ulises Blanch; 6–4, ret.	(Canada) Filip Peliwo	(Croatia) Ante Pavić (Zimbabwe) Takanyi Garanganga	(Canada) Benjamin Sigouin (United States) Junior Alexander Ore (United States) Alexios Halebian (United States) Jacob Dunbar
August 28	Canada F5 Futures; Calgary, Canada; Hard $25,000; Singles and doubles draws	(Dominican Republic) Roberto Cid Subervi (Japan) Kaichi Uchida; 6–3, 3–6, [10–8]	(United States) Deiton Baughman (United States) Henry Craig	(Croatia) Ante Pavić (Zimbabwe) Takanyi Garanganga	(Canada) Benjamin Sigouin (United States) Junior Alexander Ore (United States) Alexios Halebian (United States) Jacob Dunbar
August 28	Spain F27 Futures; San Sebastián, Spain; Clay $25,000; Singles and doubles draws	(Spain) Eduard Esteve Lobato; 5–7, 6–0, 6–1	(Spain) Alejandro Davidovich Fokina	(Spain) Íñigo Cervantes (Spain) David Jordà Sanchis	(Spain) Daniel Gimeno Traver (Argentina) Pedro Cachin (Brazil) João Menezes (Spain) Bernabé Zapata Miralles
August 28	Spain F27 Futures; San Sebastián, Spain; Clay $25,000; Singles and doubles draws	(Spain) Íñigo Cervantes (Spain) Daniel Gimeno Traver; 4–6, 7–5, [10–6]	(Spain) Alejandro Davidovich Fokina (Benin) Alexis Klégou	(Spain) Íñigo Cervantes (Spain) David Jordà Sanchis	(Spain) Daniel Gimeno Traver (Argentina) Pedro Cachin (Brazil) João Menezes (Spain) Bernabé Zapata Miralles
August 28	Argentina F5 Futures; Neuquén, Argentina; Clay $15,000; Singles and doubles draws	(Argentina) Hernán Casanova; 3–6, 6–4, 6–1	(Argentina) Facundo Argüello	(Argentina) Tomás Martín Etcheverry (Argentina) Mariano Kestelboim	(Argentina) Genaro Alberto Olivieri (Argentina) Santiago Rodríguez Taverna (Argentina) Tomás Lipovšek Puches (Chile) Bastián Malla
August 28	Argentina F5 Futures; Neuquén, Argentina; Clay $15,000; Singles and doubles draws	(Argentina) Mariano Kestelboim (Argentina) Tomás Lipovšek Puches; 1–6, 6–1, [11–9]	(Brazil) Daniel Dutra da Silva (Brazil) André Miele	(Argentina) Tomás Martín Etcheverry (Argentina) Mariano Kestelboim	(Argentina) Genaro Alberto Olivieri (Argentina) Santiago Rodríguez Taverna (Argentina) Tomás Lipovšek Puches (Chile) Bastián Malla
August 28	Belgium F11 Futures; Damme, Belgium; Clay $15,000; Singles and doubles draws	(Belgium) Jeroen Vanneste; 5–7, 6–3, 6–3	(Germany) Louis Wessels	(Belgium) Julien Dubail (Belgium) Jonas Merckx	(Japan) Rio Noguchi (Germany) Valentin Günther (Belgium) Maxime Pauwels (Belgium) Benjamin D'Hoe
August 28	Belgium F11 Futures; Damme, Belgium; Clay $15,000; Singles and doubles draws	(Belgium) Jonas Merckx (Belgium) Jeroen Vanneste; 6–2, 6–3	(Belgium) Benjamin D'Hoe (Mexico) Eduardo Peralta-Tello	(Belgium) Julien Dubail (Belgium) Jonas Merckx	(Japan) Rio Noguchi (Germany) Valentin Günther (Belgium) Maxime Pauwels (Belgium) Benjamin D'Hoe
August 28	Hungary F7 Futures; Kecskemét, Hungary; Clay $15,000; Singles and doubles draws	(Sweden) Markus Eriksson; 4–6, 6–4, 6–3	(Hungary) Zsombor Piros	(Hungary) Péter Nagy (Austria) Thomas Statzberger	(Spain) Enrique López Pérez (Austria) Dominic Weidinger (Serbia) Milan Drinić (Austria) Dennis Novak
August 28	Hungary F7 Futures; Kecskemét, Hungary; Clay $15,000; Singles and doubles draws	(Spain) Enrique López Pérez (Croatia) Matej Sabanov; 7–5, 6–3	(Sweden) Filip Bergevi (Sweden) Markus Eriksson	(Hungary) Péter Nagy (Austria) Thomas Statzberger	(Spain) Enrique López Pérez (Austria) Dominic Weidinger (Serbia) Milan Drinić (Austria) Dennis Novak
August 28	Italy F27 Futures; Piombino, Italy; Hard $15,000; Singles and doubles draws	(United Kingdom) Oliver Golding; 7–6^{(7–3)}, 6–3	(Italy) Davide Galoppini	(Israel) Igor Smilansky (Italy) Francesco Vilardo	(Italy) Riccardo Ghedin (Italy) Jacopo Stefanini (Germany) Sami Reinwein (Italy) Enrico Dalla Valle
August 28	Italy F27 Futures; Piombino, Italy; Hard $15,000; Singles and doubles draws	(Italy) Riccardo Ghedin (Belarus) Yaraslav Shyla; 7–6^{(7–4)}, 2–6, [10–6]	(Italy) Erik Crepaldi (Croatia) Fran Zvonimir Zgombić	(Israel) Igor Smilansky (Italy) Francesco Vilardo	(Italy) Riccardo Ghedin (Italy) Jacopo Stefanini (Germany) Sami Reinwein (Italy) Enrico Dalla Valle
August 28	Netherlands F7 Futures; Schoonhoven, Netherlands; Clay $15,000; Singles and doubles draws	(Austria) Gibril Diarra; 6–3, 3–6, 6–3	(Netherlands) Jelle Sels	(Czech Republic) Robin Staněk (United States) Nick Chappell	(Netherlands) Botic van de Zandschulp (Netherlands) Guy den Heijer (Netherlands) Boy Westerhof (Germany) Nico Mertens
August 28	Netherlands F7 Futures; Schoonhoven, Netherlands; Clay $15,000; Singles and doubles draws	(Netherlands) Botic van de Zandschulp (Netherlands) Boy Westerhof; 6–2, 3–2, ret.	(Netherlands) Glenn Smits (Netherlands) Colin van Beem	(Czech Republic) Robin Staněk (United States) Nick Chappell	(Netherlands) Botic van de Zandschulp (Netherlands) Guy den Heijer (Netherlands) Boy Westerhof (Germany) Nico Mertens
August 28	Poland F11 Futures; Koszalin, Poland; Clay $15,000; Singles and doubles draws	(Poland) Paweł Ciaś; 6–4, 6–3	(Poland) Marcin Gawron	(Belarus) Pavel Filin (Poland) Michał Dembek	(Ecuador) Iván Endara (Poland) Adam Chadaj (Ukraine) Vladyslav Orlov (Poland) Mateusz Kowalczyk
August 28	Poland F11 Futures; Koszalin, Poland; Clay $15,000; Singles and doubles draws	(Ecuador) Iván Endara (Poland) Szymon Walków; 6–3, 2–6, [10–7]	(Poland) Michał Dembek (Poland) Marcin Gawron	(Belarus) Pavel Filin (Poland) Michał Dembek	(Ecuador) Iván Endara (Poland) Adam Chadaj (Ukraine) Vladyslav Orlov (Poland) Mateusz Kowalczyk
August 28	Portugal F18 Futures; Sintra, Portugal; Hard $15,000; Singles and doubles draws	(Portugal) Fred Gil; 6–3, 6–2	(Spain) Pablo Vivero González	(Spain) Jaime Pulgar-García (Israel) Mor Bulis	(Spain) David Pérez Sanz (France) Evan Furness (Portugal) Nuno Deus (Spain) Andrés Artuñedo
August 28	Portugal F18 Futures; Sintra, Portugal; Hard $15,000; Singles and doubles draws	(Spain) David Pérez Sanz (Spain) Jaime Pulgar-García; 6–4, 6–2	(Portugal) Nuno Deus (Portugal) Bernardo Saraiva	(Spain) Jaime Pulgar-García (Israel) Mor Bulis	(Spain) David Pérez Sanz (France) Evan Furness (Portugal) Nuno Deus (Spain) Andrés Artuñedo
August 28	Romania F12 Futures; Brașov, Romania; Clay $15,000; Singles and doubles draws	(Lithuania) Laurynas Grigelis; 6–2, 6–2	(Argentina) Franco Agamenone	(Italy) Alessandro Petrone (Italy) Pietro Licciardi	(Romania) Vasile Antonescu (Romania) Bogdan Borza (Czech Republic) Jan Mertl (Romania) Edris Fetisleam
August 28	Romania F12 Futures; Brașov, Romania; Clay $15,000; Singles and doubles draws	(Romania) Adrian Barbu (Romania) Florin Mergea; 6–1, 6–4	(Romania) Vladimir Filip (Romania) Petru-Alexandru Luncanu	(Italy) Alessandro Petrone (Italy) Pietro Licciardi	(Romania) Vasile Antonescu (Romania) Bogdan Borza (Czech Republic) Jan Mertl (Romania) Edris Fetisleam
August 28	Serbia F4 Futures; Zlatibor, Serbia; Clay $15,000; Singles and doubles draws	(Croatia) Nino Serdarušić; 6–3, 6–2	(Argentina) Manuel Peña López	(Czech Republic) Vít Kopřiva (Italy) Cristian Carli	(Serbia) Miljan Zekić (Croatia) Domagoj Bilješko (Uzbekistan) Jurabek Karimov (Serbia) Danilo Petrović
August 28	Serbia F4 Futures; Zlatibor, Serbia; Clay $15,000; Singles and doubles draws	(Serbia) Darko Jandrić (Croatia) Ivan Sabanov; 6–4, 6–2	(Australia) Alexander Babanine (Australia) Jeremy Beale	(Czech Republic) Vít Kopřiva (Italy) Cristian Carli	(Serbia) Miljan Zekić (Croatia) Domagoj Bilješko (Uzbekistan) Jurabek Karimov (Serbia) Danilo Petrović
August 28	Switzerland F5 Futures; Sion, Switzerland; Clay $15,000; Singles and doubles draws	(Japan) Hiroyasu Ehara; 4–6, 6–4, 6–2	(Switzerland) Marc-Andrea Hüsler	(Italy) Matteo Viola (Germany) Marvin Möller	(France) Baptiste Crepatte (Colombia) Juan Manuel Benítez Chavarriaga (France) Corentin Denolly (France) Rémi Boutillier
August 28	Switzerland F5 Futures; Sion, Switzerland; Clay $15,000; Singles and doubles draws	(Switzerland) Louroi Martinez (Switzerland) Damien Wenger; 3–6, 6–4, [10–7]	(France) Baptiste Crepatte (France) Florian Ysern	(Italy) Matteo Viola (Germany) Marvin Möller	(France) Baptiste Crepatte (Colombia) Juan Manuel Benítez Chavarriaga (France) Corentin Denolly (France) Rémi Boutillier
August 28	Turkey F32 Futures; Antalya, Turkey; Clay $15,000; Singles and doubles draws	(Spain) Javier Martí; 7–6^{(7–5)}, 6–2	(Japan) Renta Tokuda	(Russia) Bogdan Bobrov (Germany) Marc Sieber	(Argentina) Dante Gennaro (Germany) Luca Gelhardt (Brazil) Wilson Leite (Russia) Timur Kiyamov
August 28	Turkey F32 Futures; Antalya, Turkey; Clay $15,000; Singles and doubles draws	(Mexico) Daniel Garza (Argentina) Patricio Heras; 6–4, 7–5	(Brazil) Caio Silva (Brazil) Thales Turini	(Russia) Bogdan Bobrov (Germany) Marc Sieber	(Argentina) Dante Gennaro (Germany) Luca Gelhardt (Brazil) Wilson Leite (Russia) Timur Kiyamov
August 28	Ukraine F4 Futures; Kyiv, Ukraine; Clay $15,000; Singles and doubles draws	(Kazakhstan) Roman Khassanov; 6–4, 6–2	(Ukraine) Artem Smirnov	(Ukraine) Vitaliy Sachko (Ukraine) Vladyslav Manafov	(Ukraine) Volodymyr Uzhylovskyi (Ukraine) Olexiy Kolisnyk (Ukraine) Oleg Prihodko (Ukraine) Yurii Dzhavakian
August 28	Ukraine F4 Futures; Kyiv, Ukraine; Clay $15,000; Singles and doubles draws	(Ukraine) Artem Smirnov (Ukraine) Volodymyr Uzhylovskyi; 7–5, 6–2	(Ukraine) Vladyslav Manafov (Ukraine) Denys Molchanov	(Ukraine) Vitaliy Sachko (Ukraine) Vladyslav Manafov	(Ukraine) Volodymyr Uzhylovskyi (Ukraine) Olexiy Kolisnyk (Ukraine) Oleg Prihodko (Ukraine) Yurii Dzhavakian

=== September ===
Week of	Tournament	Winner	Runners-up	Semifinalists	Quarterfinalists
September 4	Canada F6 Futures; Toronto, Canada; Clay $25,000; Singles and doubles draws	(United States) Kevin King; 6–1, 6–2	(Dominican Republic) Roberto Cid Subervi	(United States) Daniel Nguyen (United States) Dennis Nevolo	(Italy) Liam Caruana (Japan) Makoto Ochi (Chile) Jorge Montero (Canada) Benjamin Sigouin
September 4	Canada F6 Futures; Toronto, Canada; Clay $25,000; Singles and doubles draws	(United States) Deiton Baughman (United States) Dennis Nevolo; 7–5, 6–2	(United States) Harrison Adams (United States) Junior Alexander Ore	(United States) Daniel Nguyen (United States) Dennis Nevolo	(Italy) Liam Caruana (Japan) Makoto Ochi (Chile) Jorge Montero (Canada) Benjamin Sigouin
September 4	France F18 Futures; Bagnères-de-Bigorre, France; Hard $25,000+H; Singles and doubles draws	(France) Ugo Humbert; 7–5, 2–6, 7–6^{(7–4)}	(United Kingdom) Edward Corrie	(France) David Guez (France) Geoffrey Blancaneaux	(Turkey) Cem İlkel (France) Sadio Doumbia (France) Rémi Boutillier (Republic of Ireland) Sam Barry
September 4	France F18 Futures; Bagnères-de-Bigorre, France; Hard $25,000+H; Singles and doubles draws	(United Kingdom) Edward Corrie (Denmark) Frederik Nielsen; 6–4, 6–2	(Netherlands) Niels Lootsma (Russia) Denis Matsukevich	(France) David Guez (France) Geoffrey Blancaneaux	(Turkey) Cem İlkel (France) Sadio Doumbia (France) Rémi Boutillier (Republic of Ireland) Sam Barry
September 4	Italy F28 Futures; Trieste, Italy; Clay $25,000; Singles and doubles draws	(Bosnia and Herzegovina) Tomislav Brkić; 7–6^{(7–2)}, 4–6, 7–6^{(8–6)}	(Italy) Adelchi Virgili	(Italy) Jacopo Stefanini (Germany) Pascal Meis	(Italy) Roberto Marcora (Italy) Riccardo Balzerani (Italy) Federico Maccari (Germany) Tobias Simon
September 4	Italy F28 Futures; Trieste, Italy; Clay $25,000; Singles and doubles draws	(Italy) Marco Bortolotti (Italy) Cristian Carli; 6–3, 6–3	(Italy) Pietro Licciardi (Italy) Corrado Summaria	(Italy) Jacopo Stefanini (Germany) Pascal Meis	(Italy) Roberto Marcora (Italy) Riccardo Balzerani (Italy) Federico Maccari (Germany) Tobias Simon
September 4	Spain F28 Futures; Oviedo, Spain; Clay $25,000; Singles and doubles draws	(Brazil) João Menezes; 6–3, 6–4	(Spain) Eduard Esteve Lobato	(United Kingdom) Jay Clarke (Spain) Javier Martí	(Spain) Sergi Pérez Contri (Switzerland) Antoine Bellier (Italy) Alessandro Petrone (Spain) Sergio Gutiérrez Ferrol
September 4	Spain F28 Futures; Oviedo, Spain; Clay $25,000; Singles and doubles draws	(Argentina) Franco Agamenone (Brazil) João Menezes; 7–5, 6–3	(Norway) Viktor Durasovic (Spain) Miguel Semmler	(United Kingdom) Jay Clarke (Spain) Javier Martí	(Spain) Sergi Pérez Contri (Switzerland) Antoine Bellier (Italy) Alessandro Petrone (Spain) Sergio Gutiérrez Ferrol
September 4	Argentina F6 Futures; Buenos Aires, Argentina; Clay $15,000+H; Singles and doubles draws	(Brazil) Daniel Dutra da Silva; 6–3, 7–6^{(7–4)}	(Argentina) Facundo Argüello	(Argentina) Franco Emanuel Egea (Argentina) Tomás Lipovšek Puches	(Argentina) Federico Coria (Argentina) Mariano Kestelboim (Brazil) Carlos Eduardo Severino (Argentina) Gerónimo Espín Busleiman
September 4	Argentina F6 Futures; Buenos Aires, Argentina; Clay $15,000+H; Singles and doubles draws	(Argentina) Facundo Argüello (Argentina) Maximiliano Estévez; 7–5, 6–1	(Brazil) Daniel Dutra da Silva (Brazil) José Pereira	(Argentina) Franco Emanuel Egea (Argentina) Tomás Lipovšek Puches	(Argentina) Federico Coria (Argentina) Mariano Kestelboim (Brazil) Carlos Eduardo Severino (Argentina) Gerónimo Espín Busleiman
September 4	Belgium F12 Futures; Middelkerke, Belgium; Clay $15,000; Singles and doubles draws	(Germany) Marvin Netuschil; 4–6, 6–4, 6–2	(Germany) Benjamin Hassan	(Belgium) Jonas Merckx (Belgium) Jeroen Vanneste	(Germany) Nico Mertens (Finland) Patrik Niklas-Salminen (Chile) Marcelo Plaza (Belgium) Maxime Pauwels
September 4	Belgium F12 Futures; Middelkerke, Belgium; Clay $15,000; Singles and doubles draws	(United Kingdom) Billy Harris (Finland) Patrik Niklas-Salminen; 6–7^{(7–9)}, 7–5, [10–3]	(Netherlands) Michiel de Krom (Netherlands) Stephan Fransen	(Belgium) Jonas Merckx (Belgium) Jeroen Vanneste	(Germany) Nico Mertens (Finland) Patrik Niklas-Salminen (Chile) Marcelo Plaza (Belgium) Maxime Pauwels
September 4	Egypt F24 Futures; Cairo, Egypt; Clay $15,000; Singles and doubles draws	(Egypt) Youssef Hossam; 6–7^{(7–9)}, 6–4, 6–2	(Italy) Fabrizio Ornago	(France) Johan Tatlot (France) Fabien Reboul	(Czech Republic) David Poljak (Brazil) Fernando Romboli (France) Lény Mitjana (Egypt) Issam Haitham Taweel
September 4	Egypt F24 Futures; Cairo, Egypt; Clay $15,000; Singles and doubles draws	(France) Fabien Reboul (France) Johan Tatlot; 6–4, 6–4	(Italy) Fabrizio Ornago (Brazil) Fernando Romboli	(France) Johan Tatlot (France) Fabien Reboul	(Czech Republic) David Poljak (Brazil) Fernando Romboli (France) Lény Mitjana (Egypt) Issam Haitham Taweel
September 4	Hungary F8 Futures; Székesfehérvár, Hungary; Clay $15,000; Singles and doubles draws	(Spain) Enrique López Pérez; 6–1, 6–1	(Czech Republic) Zdeněk Kolář	(Sweden) Filip Bergevi (Ukraine) Danylo Kalenichenko	(Russia) Matvey Khomentovskiy (Czech Republic) Ondřej Krstev (Czech Republic) Petr Nouza (Austria) Thomas Statzberger
September 4	Hungary F8 Futures; Székesfehérvár, Hungary; Clay $15,000; Singles and doubles draws	(Japan) Sora Fukuda (Ukraine) Danylo Kalenichenko; 6–4, 6–4	(Czech Republic) Ondřej Krstev (Czech Republic) Patrik Rikl	(Sweden) Filip Bergevi (Ukraine) Danylo Kalenichenko	(Russia) Matvey Khomentovskiy (Czech Republic) Ondřej Krstev (Czech Republic) Petr Nouza (Austria) Thomas Statzberger
September 4	India F7 Futures; Chennai, India; Clay $15,000; Singles and doubles draws	(India) Sumit Nagal; 6–3, 6–0	(Netherlands) Colin van Beem	(India) Arjun Kadhe (India) Haadin Bava	(India) Jayesh Pungliya (United States) Cameron Silverman (South Korea) Lee Tae-woo (India) Sidharth Rawat
September 4	India F7 Futures; Chennai, India; Clay $15,000; Singles and doubles draws	(South Korea) Lee Tae-woo (South Korea) Moon Ju-hae; 6–2, 6–4	(India) Anirudh Chandrasekar (India) Vignesh Peranamallur	(India) Arjun Kadhe (India) Haadin Bava	(India) Jayesh Pungliya (United States) Cameron Silverman (South Korea) Lee Tae-woo (India) Sidharth Rawat
September 4	Serbia F5 Futures; Novi Sad, Serbia; Clay $15,000; Singles and doubles draws	(Croatia) Nino Serdarušić; 6–2, 6–2	(Croatia) Domagoj Bilješko	(France) Samuel Bensoussan (Croatia) Franjo Raspudić	(Hungary) Viktor Filipenkó (Germany) Elmar Ejupovic (Sweden) Daniel Appelgren (France) Corentin Denolly
September 4	Serbia F5 Futures; Novi Sad, Serbia; Clay $15,000; Singles and doubles draws	(Croatia) Domagoj Bilješko (Croatia) Ivan Sabanov; 0–6, 6–2, [10–3]	(Republic of Ireland) Julian Bradley (United States) Nathan Pasha	(France) Samuel Bensoussan (Croatia) Franjo Raspudić	(Hungary) Viktor Filipenkó (Germany) Elmar Ejupovic (Sweden) Daniel Appelgren (France) Corentin Denolly
September 4	Tunisia F25 Futures; Hammamet, Tunisia; Clay $15,000; Singles and doubles draws	(France) Elliot Benchetrit; 6–4, 2–0, ret.	(Germany) Rudolf Molleker	(France) Gabriel Petit (France) Jules Okala	(Spain) Aarón Cortés Alcaraz (Italy) Davide Galoppini (France) Théo Fournerie (France) Florent Diep
September 4	Tunisia F25 Futures; Hammamet, Tunisia; Clay $15,000; Singles and doubles draws	(France) Elliot Benchetrit (Germany) Rudolf Molleker; 7–5, 6–3	(Tunisia) Aziz Dougaz (Tunisia) Anis Ghorbel	(France) Gabriel Petit (France) Jules Okala	(Spain) Aarón Cortés Alcaraz (Italy) Davide Galoppini (France) Théo Fournerie (France) Florent Diep
September 4	Turkey F33 Futures; Antalya, Turkey; Clay $15,000; Singles and doubles draws	(Turkey) Marsel İlhan; 4–6, 6–1, 6–4	(Austria) Bastian Trinker	(Russia) Ronald Slobodchikov (Russia) Victor Baluda	(Argentina) Dante Gennaro (Russia) Timur Kiyamov (Russia) Ilya Vasilyev (Israel) Alon Elia
September 4	Turkey F33 Futures; Antalya, Turkey; Clay $15,000; Singles and doubles draws	(Mexico) Daniel Garza (Brazil) Felipe Meligeni Alves; 5–7, 7–6^{(7–5)}, [10–5]	(Russia) Victor Baluda (Russia) Ilya Vasilyev	(Russia) Ronald Slobodchikov (Russia) Victor Baluda	(Argentina) Dante Gennaro (Russia) Timur Kiyamov (Russia) Ilya Vasilyev (Israel) Alon Elia
September 4	Ukraine F5 Futures; Kremenchuk, Ukraine; Clay $15,000; Singles and doubles draws	(Russia) Ivan Nedelko; 6–0, 6–0	(Russia) Yan Sabanin	(Germany) Julian Onken (France) Baptiste Crepatte	(Ukraine) Vladyslav Orlov (Ukraine) Dmytro Kamynin (Italy) Francesco Vilardo (Ukraine) Alexander Lebedyn
September 4	Ukraine F5 Futures; Kremenchuk, Ukraine; Clay $15,000; Singles and doubles draws	(Ukraine) Vladyslav Manafov (Ukraine) Denys Molchanov; 5–7, 6–4, [10–8]	(Ukraine) Dmytro Kamynin (Ukraine) Daniil Zarichanskyy	(Germany) Julian Onken (France) Baptiste Crepatte	(Ukraine) Vladyslav Orlov (Ukraine) Dmytro Kamynin (Italy) Francesco Vilardo (Ukraine) Alexander Lebedyn
September 11	Canada F7 Futures; Toronto, Canada; Hard $25,000; Singles and doubles draws	(Japan) Kaichi Uchida; 7–6^{(8–6)}, 3–6, 6–1	(United States) Dennis Nevolo	(Republic of Ireland) Sam Barry (Canada) Benjamin Sigouin	(United Kingdom) Andrew Watson (United States) Shane Vinsant (Canada) Samuel Monette (United States) Alexios Halebian
September 11	Canada F7 Futures; Toronto, Canada; Hard $25,000; Singles and doubles draws	(United States) Harrison Adams (United States) Shane Vinsant; 6–3, 6–2	(United States) Gary Kushnirovich (France) Yanais Laurent	(Republic of Ireland) Sam Barry (Canada) Benjamin Sigouin	(United Kingdom) Andrew Watson (United States) Shane Vinsant (Canada) Samuel Monette (United States) Alexios Halebian
September 11	France F19 Futures; Mulhouse, France; Hard (indoor) $25,000+H; Singles and doubles draws	(Belgium) Niels Desein; 6–3, 4–6, 6–3	(United Kingdom) Edward Corrie	(France) David Guez (Germany) Benjamin Hassan	(France) Tristan Lamasine (France) Maxime Tchoutakian (France) Tom Jomby (France) Albano Olivetti
September 11	France F19 Futures; Mulhouse, France; Hard (indoor) $25,000+H; Singles and doubles draws	(France) Dan Added (France) Albano Olivetti; 6–4, 6–7^{(3–7)}, [10–7]	(Germany) Johannes Härteis (France) Hugo Voljacques	(France) David Guez (Germany) Benjamin Hassan	(France) Tristan Lamasine (France) Maxime Tchoutakian (France) Tom Jomby (France) Albano Olivetti
September 11	Italy F29 Futures; Pula, Italy; Clay $25,000; Singles and doubles draws	(Italy) Federico Gaio; 6–2, 7–5	(United Kingdom) Jay Clarke	(Italy) Alessandro Petrone (Italy) Riccardo Bonadio	(Italy) Andrea Pellegrino (France) Benjamin Pietri (Sweden) Fred Simonsson (Italy) Pietro Rondoni
September 11	Italy F29 Futures; Pula, Italy; Clay $25,000; Singles and doubles draws	(Sweden) Fred Simonsson (Italy) Corrado Summaria; 6–1, 6–4	(Italy) Cristian Carli (Italy) Andrea Vavassori	(Italy) Alessandro Petrone (Italy) Riccardo Bonadio	(Italy) Andrea Pellegrino (France) Benjamin Pietri (Sweden) Fred Simonsson (Italy) Pietro Rondoni
September 11	Spain F29 Futures; Seville, Spain; Clay $25,000+H; Singles and doubles draws	(Spain) Daniel Muñoz de la Nava; 7–6^{(7–5)}, 6–2	(Argentina) Pedro Cachin	(Spain) Pedro Martínez (France) Axel Michon	(Spain) Marc Giner (Spain) Gerard Granollers (Spain) Mario Vilella Martínez (Spain) Jordi Samper Montaña
September 11	Spain F29 Futures; Seville, Spain; Clay $25,000+H; Singles and doubles draws	(Spain) Pedro Martínez (Spain) David Vega Hernández; 3–6, 6–4, [10–5]	(Spain) Marc Giner (Spain) Jaume Pla Malfeito	(Spain) Pedro Martínez (France) Axel Michon	(Spain) Marc Giner (Spain) Gerard Granollers (Spain) Mario Vilella Martínez (Spain) Jordi Samper Montaña
September 11	Argentina F7 Futures; Buenos Aires, Argentina; Clay $15,000; Singles and doubles draws	(Uruguay) Martín Cuevas; 6–4, 7–6^{(7–4)}	(Brazil) Daniel Dutra da Silva	(Argentina) Facundo Argüello (Bolivia) Hugo Dellien	(Argentina) Juan Ignacio Ameal (Argentina) Franco Emanuel Egea (Argentina) Mariano Kestelboim (Argentina) Juan Ignacio Galarza
September 11	Argentina F7 Futures; Buenos Aires, Argentina; Clay $15,000; Singles and doubles draws	(Argentina) Juan Ignacio Galarza (Argentina) Tomás Lipovšek Puches; 6–4, 6–4	(Argentina) Gabriel Alejandro Hidalgo (Argentina) Federico Moreno	(Argentina) Facundo Argüello (Bolivia) Hugo Dellien	(Argentina) Juan Ignacio Ameal (Argentina) Franco Emanuel Egea (Argentina) Mariano Kestelboim (Argentina) Juan Ignacio Galarza
September 11	Egypt F25 Futures; Cairo, Egypt; Clay $15,000; Singles and doubles draws	(France) Johan Tatlot; 6–4, 6–4	(Egypt) Youssef Hossam	(France) Fabien Reboul (Italy) Fabrizio Ornago	(France) Lény Mitjana (Czech Republic) David Poljak (United States) Tyler Mercier (France) Thomas Bréchemier
September 11	Egypt F25 Futures; Cairo, Egypt; Clay $15,000; Singles and doubles draws	(Argentina) Franco Feitt (Spain) David Pérez Sanz; 6–2, 6–2	(Italy) Francesco Bessire (France) Lény Mitjana	(France) Fabien Reboul (Italy) Fabrizio Ornago	(France) Lény Mitjana (Czech Republic) David Poljak (United States) Tyler Mercier (France) Thomas Bréchemier
September 11	Great Britain F4 Futures; Nottingham, Great Britain; Hard $15,000; Singles and doubles draws	(United Kingdom) Lloyd Glasspool; 5–7, 6–4, 6–4	(United Kingdom) Oliver Golding	(France) Evan Furness (United Kingdom) Finn Bass	(Monaco) Lucas Catarina (United Kingdom) Ryan Peniston (Italy) Enrico Dalla Valle (Republic of Ireland) Peter Bothwell
September 11	Great Britain F4 Futures; Nottingham, Great Britain; Hard $15,000; Singles and doubles draws	(France) Romain Bauvy (France) Jonathan Kanar; 6–3, 5–7, [10–8]	(Republic of Ireland) Peter Bothwell (United Kingdom) Luke Johnson	(France) Evan Furness (United Kingdom) Finn Bass	(Monaco) Lucas Catarina (United Kingdom) Ryan Peniston (Italy) Enrico Dalla Valle (Republic of Ireland) Peter Bothwell
September 11	India F8 Futures; Chennai, India; Hard $15,000; Singles and doubles draws	(India) Sasikumar Mukund; 4–6, 6–3, 6–3	(Netherlands) Colin van Beem	(South Korea) Oh Seong-gook (India) Arjun Kadhe	(France) Clément Larrière (India) Jayesh Pungliya (Canada) Kelsey Stevenson (India) Haadin Bava
September 11	India F8 Futures; Chennai, India; Hard $15,000; Singles and doubles draws	(India) Chandril Sood (India) Lakshit Sood; 4–6, 6–3, [12–10]	(India) Arjun Kadhe (India) Rishabdev Raman	(South Korea) Oh Seong-gook (India) Arjun Kadhe	(France) Clément Larrière (India) Jayesh Pungliya (Canada) Kelsey Stevenson (India) Haadin Bava
September 11	Tunisia F26 Futures; Hammamet, Tunisia; Clay $15,000; Singles and doubles draws	(France) Elliot Benchetrit; 6–4, 6–2	(Italy) Luca Giacomini	(France) Jules Okala (Italy) Filippo Baldi	(France) Thomas Setodji (Italy) Davide Galoppini (Italy) Andrea Grazioso (Italy) Nicolò Turchetti
September 11	Tunisia F26 Futures; Hammamet, Tunisia; Clay $15,000; Singles and doubles draws	(Italy) Filippo Baldi (Italy) Mirko Cutuli; 6–4, 6–4	(France) Elliot Benchetrit (Germany) Louis Wessels	(France) Jules Okala (Italy) Filippo Baldi	(France) Thomas Setodji (Italy) Davide Galoppini (Italy) Andrea Grazioso (Italy) Nicolò Turchetti
September 11	Turkey F34 Futures; Antalya, Turkey; Clay $15,000; Singles and doubles draws	(Argentina) Patricio Heras; 6–1, 6–2	(Italy) Omar Giacalone	(Argentina) Dante Gennaro (France) Samuel Bensoussan	(Russia) Ilya Vasilyev (Japan) Renta Tokuda (Italy) Antonio Massara (Japan) Ken Onishi
September 11	Turkey F34 Futures; Antalya, Turkey; Clay $15,000; Singles and doubles draws	(Brazil) Caio Silva (Brazil) Thales Turini; 4–6, 7–6^{(7–2)}, [11–9]	(France) Samuel Bensoussan (Uruguay) Santiago Maresca	(Argentina) Dante Gennaro (France) Samuel Bensoussan	(Russia) Ilya Vasilyev (Japan) Renta Tokuda (Italy) Antonio Massara (Japan) Ken Onishi
September 11	USA F30 Futures; Claremont, United States; Hard $15,000; Singles and doubles draws	(Brazil) Karue Sell; 6–7^{(4–7)}, 6–4, 6–3	(United States) Martin Redlicki	(United States) Deiton Baughman (United States) Henry Craig	(Belgium) Laurens Verboven (United States) Ronnie Schneider (Brazil) Eduardo Dischinger (United States) Jenson Brooksby
September 11	USA F30 Futures; Claremont, United States; Hard $15,000; Singles and doubles draws	(United States) Deiton Baughman (Brazil) Karue Sell; 6–4, 7–5	(Zimbabwe) Benjamin Lock (United States) Evan Song	(United States) Deiton Baughman (United States) Henry Craig	(Belgium) Laurens Verboven (United States) Ronnie Schneider (Brazil) Eduardo Dischinger (United States) Jenson Brooksby
September 18	Australia F4 Futures; Alice Springs, Australia; Hard $25,000+H; Singles and doubles draws	(Australia) Maverick Banes; 7–5, 7–6^{(7–5)}	(Australia) Harry Bourchier	(Australia) Scott Puodziunas (Australia) Bradley Mousley	(Australia) Andrew Harris (Australia) Daniel Nolan (Australia) Blake Ellis (Australia) Michael Look
September 18	Australia F4 Futures; Alice Springs, Australia; Hard $25,000+H; Singles and doubles draws	(Australia) Dane Propoggia (Australia) Scott Puodziunas; 6–4, 6–4	(Australia) Bradley Mousley (Australia) Darren Polkinghorne	(Australia) Scott Puodziunas (Australia) Bradley Mousley	(Australia) Andrew Harris (Australia) Daniel Nolan (Australia) Blake Ellis (Australia) Michael Look
September 18	Canada F8 Futures; Niagara, Canada; Hard (indoor) $25,000; Singles and doubles draws	(Canada) Samuel Monette; 6–3, 7–6^{(7–4)}	(Republic of Ireland) Sam Barry	(United States) Harrison Adams (United States) Nicholas Hu	(Chile) Alejandro Tabilo (Canada) Benjamin Sigouin (United States) Gary Kushnirovich (United States) Dennis Nevolo
September 18	Canada F8 Futures; Niagara, Canada; Hard (indoor) $25,000; Singles and doubles draws	(United States) Nicholas Hu (Canada) Samuel Monette; 6–0, 6–2	(United States) Gary Kushnirovich (France) Yanais Laurent	(United States) Harrison Adams (United States) Nicholas Hu	(Chile) Alejandro Tabilo (Canada) Benjamin Sigouin (United States) Gary Kushnirovich (United States) Dennis Nevolo
September 18	France F20 Futures; Plaisir, France; Hard (indoor) $25,000+H; Singles and doubles draws	(France) Antoine Hoang; 4–6, 6–3, 6–4	(Netherlands) Igor Sijsling	(France) Constant Lestienne (France) Geoffrey Blancaneaux	(Switzerland) Adrien Bossel (Poland) Hubert Hurkacz (France) Mick Lescure (France) Albano Olivetti
September 18	France F20 Futures; Plaisir, France; Hard (indoor) $25,000+H; Singles and doubles draws	(United States) Nathaniel Lammons (United States) Alex Lawson; 4–6, 7–6^{(9–7)}, [10–4]	(France) Antoine Hoang (France) Grégoire Jacq	(France) Constant Lestienne (France) Geoffrey Blancaneaux	(Switzerland) Adrien Bossel (Poland) Hubert Hurkacz (France) Mick Lescure (France) Albano Olivetti
September 18	Italy F30 Futures; Pula, Italy; Clay $25,000; Singles and doubles draws	(Italy) Andrea Pellegrino; 6–4, 6–3	(Italy) Andrea Basso	(Italy) Cristian Carli (Serbia) Miomir Kecmanović	(France) Maxime Chazal (Brazil) Wilson Leite (Germany) Paul Wörner (Italy) Lorenzo Sonego
September 18	Italy F30 Futures; Pula, Italy; Clay $25,000; Singles and doubles draws	(Italy) Federico Gaio (Italy) Andrea Pellegrino; 7–6^{(7–1)}, 6–1	(Austria) Matthias Haim (Germany) Jakob Sude	(Italy) Cristian Carli (Serbia) Miomir Kecmanović	(France) Maxime Chazal (Brazil) Wilson Leite (Germany) Paul Wörner (Italy) Lorenzo Sonego
September 18	Kazakhstan F6 Futures; Shymkent, Kazakhstan; Clay $25,000; Singles and doubles draws	(Spain) Enrique López Pérez; 2–6, 6–4, 6–4	(Bosnia and Herzegovina) Tomislav Brkić	(Uzbekistan) Khumoyun Sultanov (Argentina) Marco Trungelliti	(Russia) Ilya Vasilyev (Belgium) Kimmer Coppejans (Uzbekistan) Jurabek Karimov (Ukraine) Vladyslav Manafov
September 18	Kazakhstan F6 Futures; Shymkent, Kazakhstan; Clay $25,000; Singles and doubles draws	(Ukraine) Artem Smirnov (Ukraine) Volodymyr Uzhylovskyi; 6–4, 6–3	(Russia) Mikhail Fufygin (Estonia) Vladimir Ivanov	(Uzbekistan) Khumoyun Sultanov (Argentina) Marco Trungelliti	(Russia) Ilya Vasilyev (Belgium) Kimmer Coppejans (Uzbekistan) Jurabek Karimov (Ukraine) Vladyslav Manafov
September 18	Spain F30 Futures; Madrid, Spain; Clay (indoor) $25,000; Singles and doubles draws	(France) Corentin Moutet; 6–4, 6–1	(Spain) Guillermo Olaso	(Spain) Pedro Martínez (Spain) Javier Martí	(Norway) Viktor Durasovic (Spain) Daniel Muñoz de la Nava (Spain) Sergio Martos Gornés (Belgium) Yannick Vandenbulcke
September 18	Spain F30 Futures; Madrid, Spain; Clay (indoor) $25,000; Singles and doubles draws	(Spain) Pedro Martínez (Spain) Miguel Semmler; 6–4, 6–4	(Belgium) Christopher Heyman (Belgium) Yannick Vandenbulcke	(Spain) Pedro Martínez (Spain) Javier Martí	(Norway) Viktor Durasovic (Spain) Daniel Muñoz de la Nava (Spain) Sergio Martos Gornés (Belgium) Yannick Vandenbulcke
September 18	Bolivia F1 Futures; La Paz, Bolivia; Clay $15,000; Singles and doubles draws	(Argentina) Juan Ignacio Galarza; 6–6, ret.	(Ecuador) Gonzalo Escobar	(Argentina) Matías Zukas (Bolivia) Federico Zeballos	(Colombia) Felipe Mantilla (Chile) Marcelo Tomás Barrios Vera (Peru) Mauricio Echazú (Peru) Jorge Panta
September 18	Bolivia F1 Futures; La Paz, Bolivia; Clay $15,000; Singles and doubles draws	(Guatemala) Christopher Díaz Figueroa (Bolivia) Federico Zeballos; 6–4, 6–3	(Argentina) Juan Ignacio Galarza (Argentina) Matías Zukas	(Argentina) Matías Zukas (Bolivia) Federico Zeballos	(Colombia) Felipe Mantilla (Chile) Marcelo Tomás Barrios Vera (Peru) Mauricio Echazú (Peru) Jorge Panta
September 18	Egypt F26 Futures; Sharm El Sheikh, Egypt; Hard $15,000; Singles and doubles draws	(Czech Republic) Tomáš Papík; 6–4, 5–7, 7–6^{(8–6)}	(Slovakia) Patrik Néma	(France) Lény Mitjana (Italy) Francesco Vilardo	(France) Jaimee Floyd Angele (Slovakia) Lukáš Klein (Netherlands) Scott Griekspoor (Czech Republic) Marek Gengel
September 18	Egypt F26 Futures; Sharm El Sheikh, Egypt; Hard $15,000; Singles and doubles draws	(Czech Republic) Marek Gengel (Czech Republic) Tomáš Papík; 6–3, 6–2	(Netherlands) Scott Griekspoor (Benin) Alexis Klégou	(France) Lény Mitjana (Italy) Francesco Vilardo	(France) Jaimee Floyd Angele (Slovakia) Lukáš Klein (Netherlands) Scott Griekspoor (Czech Republic) Marek Gengel
September 18	Great Britain F5 Futures; Roehampton, Great Britain; Hard $15,000; Singles and doubles draws	(United Kingdom) Tom Farquharson; 7–6^{(7–5)}, 6–2	(Czech Republic) Michal Konečný	(United Kingdom) Lloyd Glasspool (Monaco) Lucas Catarina	(France) Jonathan Kanar (United Kingdom) Richard Gabb (France) Romain Bauvy (United Kingdom) Neil Pauffley
September 18	Great Britain F5 Futures; Roehampton, Great Britain; Hard $15,000; Singles and doubles draws	(Switzerland) Adrian Bodmer (Monaco) Lucas Catarina; 6–2, 6–2	(Republic of Ireland) Peter Bothwell (United Kingdom) Luke Johnson	(United Kingdom) Lloyd Glasspool (Monaco) Lucas Catarina	(France) Jonathan Kanar (United Kingdom) Richard Gabb (France) Romain Bauvy (United Kingdom) Neil Pauffley
September 18	India F9 Futures; Coimbatore, India; Hard $15,000; Singles and doubles draws	(India) Sasikumar Mukund; 6–3, 6–4	(India) Arjun Kadhe	(India) Aryan Goveas (Chinese Taipei) Meng Cing-yang	(United States) Cameron Silverman (France) Clément Larrière (Chinese Taipei) Hung Jui-chen (Netherlands) Colin van Beem
September 18	India F9 Futures; Coimbatore, India; Hard $15,000; Singles and doubles draws	(India) Chandril Sood (India) Lakshit Sood; 6–4, 6–2	(India) Arjun Kadhe (India) Sasikumar Mukund	(India) Aryan Goveas (Chinese Taipei) Meng Cing-yang	(United States) Cameron Silverman (France) Clément Larrière (Chinese Taipei) Hung Jui-chen (Netherlands) Colin van Beem
September 18	Portugal F19 Futures; Castelo Branco, Portugal; Hard $15,000; Singles and doubles draws	(Spain) Carlos Gómez-Herrera; 7–5, 6–1	(Portugal) Fred Gil	(Portugal) João Monteiro (Spain) Pablo Vivero González	(Serbia) Darko Jandrić (Spain) Andrés Artuñedo (Spain) Jaime Pulgar-García (Portugal) Nuno Deus
September 18	Portugal F19 Futures; Castelo Branco, Portugal; Hard $15,000; Singles and doubles draws	(Portugal) Fred Gil (Spain) Carlos Gómez-Herrera; 6–2, 6–4	(Portugal) Nuno Deus (Portugal) Luís Faria	(Portugal) João Monteiro (Spain) Pablo Vivero González	(Serbia) Darko Jandrić (Spain) Andrés Artuñedo (Spain) Jaime Pulgar-García (Portugal) Nuno Deus
September 18	Tunisia F27 Futures; Hammamet, Tunisia; Clay $15,000; Singles and doubles draws	(Italy) Filippo Baldi; 6–0, 6–4	(Portugal) Frederico Ferreira Silva	(France) Laurent Rochette (France) Alexis Musialek	(Germany) Louis Wessels (Brazil) Marcelo Zormann (France) Baptiste Crepatte (Belgium) Romain Barbosa
September 18	Tunisia F27 Futures; Hammamet, Tunisia; Clay $15,000; Singles and doubles draws	(Finland) Harri Heliövaara (United States) Evan Zhu; 6–1, 6–4	(Brazil) Luís Britto (Brazil) Marcelo Zormann	(France) Laurent Rochette (France) Alexis Musialek	(Germany) Louis Wessels (Brazil) Marcelo Zormann (France) Baptiste Crepatte (Belgium) Romain Barbosa
September 18	Turkey F35 Futures; Antalya, Turkey; Clay $15,000; Singles and doubles draws	(Belgium) Julien Cagnina; 6–3, 6–3	(Romania) Dragoș Dima	(Croatia) Mate Delić (Austria) Dennis Novak	(Germany) Johann Willems (Germany) Kevin Kaczynski (Japan) Renta Tokuda (Belgium) Germain Gigounon
September 18	Turkey F35 Futures; Antalya, Turkey; Clay $15,000; Singles and doubles draws	(Netherlands) Michiel de Krom (Germany) Johann Willems; 6–7^{(0–7)}, 6–2, [11–9]	(Austria) Alexander Erler (Czech Republic) Vít Kopřiva	(Croatia) Mate Delić (Austria) Dennis Novak	(Germany) Johann Willems (Germany) Kevin Kaczynski (Japan) Renta Tokuda (Belgium) Germain Gigounon
September 18	USA F31 Futures; Laguna Niguel, United States; Hard $15,000; Singles and doubles draws	(United States) Ryan Shane; 6–3, 6–3	(United States) Henry Craig	(United States) Trevor Allen Johnson (United States) Collin Altamirano	(Zimbabwe) Takanyi Garanganga (Japan) Jumpei Yamasaki (United States) Hunter Callahan (United States) Tom Fawcett
September 18	USA F31 Futures; Laguna Niguel, United States; Hard $15,000; Singles and doubles draws	(United States) Ronnie Schneider (United States) Ryan Shane; 7–5, 6–2	(United States) Trevor Allen Johnson (United States) Patrick Kawka	(United States) Trevor Allen Johnson (United States) Collin Altamirano	(Zimbabwe) Takanyi Garanganga (Japan) Jumpei Yamasaki (United States) Hunter Callahan (United States) Tom Fawcett
September 25	Australia F5 Futures; Brisbane, Australia; Hard $25,000; Singles and doubles draws	(Australia) Bradley Mousley; 6–3, 4–6, 6–2	(Australia) Benjamin Mitchell	(Australia) Maverick Banes (Australia) Andrew Harris	(Japan) Sora Fukuda (United Kingdom) Rhett Purcell (China) Li Zhe (Australia) Dayne Kelly
September 25	Australia F5 Futures; Brisbane, Australia; Hard $25,000; Singles and doubles draws	(Australia) Maverick Banes (Australia) Blake Ellis; 4–6, 6–1, [10–4]	(United States) Nathan Pasha (Australia) Darren Polkinghorne	(Australia) Maverick Banes (Australia) Andrew Harris	(Japan) Sora Fukuda (United Kingdom) Rhett Purcell (China) Li Zhe (Australia) Dayne Kelly
September 25	Italy F31 Futures; Pula, Italy; Clay $25,000; Singles and doubles draws	(Italy) Lorenzo Sonego; 6–1, 3–1, ret.	(Spain) Javier Martí	(Serbia) Miljan Zekić (Italy) Federico Gaio	(Italy) Federico Iannaccone (Germany) Tobias Simon (Austria) Matthias Haim (Serbia) Miomir Kecmanović
September 25	Italy F31 Futures; Pula, Italy; Clay $25,000; Singles and doubles draws	(Spain) Javier Martí (Spain) Miguel Semmler; 6–3, 7–6^{(7–5)}	(United Kingdom) Toby Martin (Italy) Francesco Moncagatto	(Serbia) Miljan Zekić (Italy) Federico Gaio	(Italy) Federico Iannaccone (Germany) Tobias Simon (Austria) Matthias Haim (Serbia) Miomir Kecmanović
September 25	Kazakhstan F7 Futures; Shymkent, Kazakhstan; Clay $25,000; Singles and doubles draws	(Hungary) Attila Balázs; 6–1, 6–2	(Belgium) Kimmer Coppejans	(Egypt) Mohamed Safwat (Spain) Enrique López Pérez	(Bosnia and Herzegovina) Tomislav Brkić (Ukraine) Vladyslav Manafov (Argentina) Marco Trungelliti (Kazakhstan) Dmitry Popko
September 25	Kazakhstan F7 Futures; Shymkent, Kazakhstan; Clay $25,000; Singles and doubles draws	(Spain) Enrique López Pérez (Argentina) Marco Trungelliti; 6–2, 6–3	(Hungary) Gábor Borsos (Ukraine) Vladyslav Manafov	(Egypt) Mohamed Safwat (Spain) Enrique López Pérez	(Bosnia and Herzegovina) Tomislav Brkić (Ukraine) Vladyslav Manafov (Argentina) Marco Trungelliti (Kazakhstan) Dmitry Popko
September 25	Portugal F20 Futures; Oliveira de Azeméis, Portugal; Hard $25,000+H; Singles and doubles draws	(Belgium) Yannick Mertens; 3–6, 7–6^{(7–5)}, 6–2	(Serbia) Peđa Krstin	(Portugal) João Monteiro (France) Sadio Doumbia	(Spain) Carlos Gómez-Herrera (Germany) Daniel Masur (France) Gianni Mina (Spain) Roberto Ortega Olmedo
September 25	Portugal F20 Futures; Oliveira de Azeméis, Portugal; Hard $25,000+H; Singles and doubles draws	(Portugal) Francisco Cabral (Portugal) Nuno Deus; 3–6, 6–3, [10–8]	(Belgium) Niels Desein (Belgium) Yannick Mertens	(Portugal) João Monteiro (France) Sadio Doumbia	(Spain) Carlos Gómez-Herrera (Germany) Daniel Masur (France) Gianni Mina (Spain) Roberto Ortega Olmedo
September 25	Spain F31 Futures; Sabadell, Spain; Clay $25,000; Singles and doubles draws	(Spain) Sergio Gutiérrez Ferrol; 6–3, 7–6^{(7–5)}	(Canada) Steven Diez	(Spain) Albert Alcaraz Ivorra (Austria) Pascal Brunner	(Spain) Jaume Pla Malfeito (Spain) Marc Giner (Belgium) Yannick Vandenbulcke (Spain) Bernabé Zapata Miralles
September 25	Spain F31 Futures; Sabadell, Spain; Clay $25,000; Singles and doubles draws	(Belgium) Christopher Heyman (Belgium) Yannick Vandenbulcke; 6–4, 6–2	(Spain) Sergio Gutiérrez Ferrol (Spain) Sergi Pérez Contri	(Spain) Albert Alcaraz Ivorra (Austria) Pascal Brunner	(Spain) Jaume Pla Malfeito (Spain) Marc Giner (Belgium) Yannick Vandenbulcke (Spain) Bernabé Zapata Miralles
September 25	Sweden F3 Futures; Jönköping, Sweden; Hard (indoor) $25,000; Singles and doubles draws	(Netherlands) Tallon Griekspoor; 7–6^{(7–5)}, 6–4	(Belarus) Dzmitry Zhyrmont	(Switzerland) Adrien Bossel (Sweden) Fred Simonsson	(Brazil) João Menezes (Russia) Aleksandr Vasilenko (Israel) Igor Smilansky (Italy) Matteo Viola
September 25	Sweden F3 Futures; Jönköping, Sweden; Hard (indoor) $25,000; Singles and doubles draws	(Sweden) Markus Eriksson (Sweden) Milos Sekulic; 6–0, 6–2	(Netherlands) Kevin Griekspoor (Netherlands) Tallon Griekspoor	(Switzerland) Adrien Bossel (Sweden) Fred Simonsson	(Brazil) João Menezes (Russia) Aleksandr Vasilenko (Israel) Igor Smilansky (Italy) Matteo Viola
September 25	Bolivia F2 Futures; Cochabamba, Bolivia; Clay $15,000; Singles and doubles draws	(Bolivia) Hugo Dellien; 6–4, 6–2	(Colombia) Felipe Mantilla	(Bolivia) Federico Zeballos (Chile) Marcelo Tomás Barrios Vera	(Argentina) Matías Zukas (Colombia) Juan Manuel Benítez Chavarriaga (Argentina) Juan Ignacio Galarza (Argentina) Franco Emanuel Egea
September 25	Bolivia F2 Futures; Cochabamba, Bolivia; Clay $15,000; Singles and doubles draws	(Bolivia) Boris Arias (Bolivia) Hugo Dellien; 6–3, 6–3	(Guatemala) Christopher Díaz Figueroa (Bolivia) Federico Zeballos	(Bolivia) Federico Zeballos (Chile) Marcelo Tomás Barrios Vera	(Argentina) Matías Zukas (Colombia) Juan Manuel Benítez Chavarriaga (Argentina) Juan Ignacio Galarza (Argentina) Franco Emanuel Egea
September 25	Egypt F27 Futures; Sharm El Sheikh, Egypt; Hard $15,000; Singles and doubles draws	(Egypt) Youssef Hossam; 6–3, 6–4	(Spain) David Pérez Sanz	(Netherlands) Scott Griekspoor (South Africa) Nicolaas Scholtz	(Italy) Francesco Vilardo (Czech Republic) Tomáš Papík (Benin) Alexis Klégou (France) Lény Mitjana
September 25	Egypt F27 Futures; Sharm El Sheikh, Egypt; Hard $15,000; Singles and doubles draws	(Poland) Piotr Matuszewski (Poland) Kacper Żuk; 6–2, 6–2	(Czech Republic) Marek Gengel (Czech Republic) Tomáš Papík	(Netherlands) Scott Griekspoor (South Africa) Nicolaas Scholtz	(Italy) Francesco Vilardo (Czech Republic) Tomáš Papík (Benin) Alexis Klégou (France) Lény Mitjana
September 25	France F21 Futures; Forbach, France; Carpet (indoor) $15,000; Singles and doubles draws	(Germany) Robin Kern; 4–6, 7–5, 6–1	(Germany) Benjamin Hassan	(France) Ugo Humbert (Germany) Elmar Ejupovic	(Czech Republic) Marek Jaloviec (France) Hugo Schott (Germany) Julian Lenz (France) Albano Olivetti
September 25	France F21 Futures; Forbach, France; Carpet (indoor) $15,000; Singles and doubles draws	(Germany) Robin Kern (Germany) Sami Reinwein; 3–6, 6–3, [10–5]	(France) Albano Olivetti (France) Hugo Voljacques	(France) Ugo Humbert (Germany) Elmar Ejupovic	(Czech Republic) Marek Jaloviec (France) Hugo Schott (Germany) Julian Lenz (France) Albano Olivetti
September 25	Great Britain F6 Futures; Barnstaple, Great Britain; Hard (indoor) $15,000; Singles and doubles draws	(United Kingdom) Tom Farquharson; 7–5, 6–3	(France) Grégoire Barrère	(France) David Guez (United Kingdom) Billy Harris	(United Kingdom) Anton Matusevich (United Kingdom) Luke Johnson (United Kingdom) Neil Pauffley (Czech Republic) Michal Konečný
September 25	Great Britain F6 Futures; Barnstaple, Great Britain; Hard (indoor) $15,000; Singles and doubles draws	(Republic of Ireland) Peter Bothwell (United Kingdom) Neil Pauffley; 6–4, 6–7^{(5–7)}, [10–6]	(United Kingdom) Robert Carter (United Kingdom) Ryan Peniston	(France) David Guez (United Kingdom) Billy Harris	(United Kingdom) Anton Matusevich (United Kingdom) Luke Johnson (United Kingdom) Neil Pauffley (Czech Republic) Michal Konečný
September 25	Tunisia F28 Futures; Hammamet, Tunisia; Clay $15,000; Singles and doubles draws	(France) Baptiste Crepatte; 7–6^{(7–5)}, 6–2	(France) Samuel Bensoussan	(France) Laurent Rochette (Spain) Pol Toledo Bagué	(Portugal) Frederico Ferreira Silva (Finland) Harri Heliövaara (Brazil) Marcelo Zormann (Italy) Alessandro Luisi
September 25	Tunisia F28 Futures; Hammamet, Tunisia; Clay $15,000; Singles and doubles draws	(France) Laurent Rochette (Spain) Pol Toledo Bagué; 6–4, 6–1	(Brazil) Luís Britto (Brazil) Marcelo Zormann	(France) Laurent Rochette (Spain) Pol Toledo Bagué	(Portugal) Frederico Ferreira Silva (Finland) Harri Heliövaara (Brazil) Marcelo Zormann (Italy) Alessandro Luisi
September 25	Turkey F36 Futures; Antalya, Turkey; Clay $15,000; Singles and doubles draws	(Austria) Dennis Novak; 6–3, 6–4	(Croatia) Mate Delić	(Belgium) Jeroen Vanneste (Belgium) Julien Cagnina	(Japan) Renta Tokuda (Czech Republic) Vít Kopřiva (Austria) Thomas Statzberger (Bosnia and Herzegovina) Nerman Fatić
September 25	Turkey F36 Futures; Antalya, Turkey; Clay $15,000; Singles and doubles draws	(Belgium) Jonas Merckx (Belgium) Jeroen Vanneste; 6–2, 6–4	(Netherlands) Michiel de Krom (Czech Republic) Robin Staněk	(Belgium) Jeroen Vanneste (Belgium) Julien Cagnina	(Japan) Renta Tokuda (Czech Republic) Vít Kopřiva (Austria) Thomas Statzberger (Bosnia and Herzegovina) Nerman Fatić
September 25	USA F32 Futures; Fountain Valley, United States; Hard $15,000; Singles and doubles draws	(United States) Ronnie Schneider; 5–7, 6–2, 7–6^{(7–1)}	(United States) Ryan Shane	(United States) Henry Craig (Brazil) Igor Marcondes	(Belgium) Michael Geerts (France) Arthur Rinderknech (Brazil) Karue Sell (Zimbabwe) Benjamin Lock
September 25	USA F32 Futures; Fountain Valley, United States; Hard $15,000; Singles and doubles draws	(United States) Elliott Orkin (United States) Ronnie Schneider; Walkover	(United States) Martin Redlicki (Brazil) Karue Sell	(United States) Henry Craig (Brazil) Igor Marcondes	(Belgium) Michael Geerts (France) Arthur Rinderknech (Brazil) Karue Sell (Zimbabwe) Benjamin Lock
