= 2015 ITF Men's Circuit (October–December) =

This article includes the 2015 ITF Men's Circuit tournaments which occurred between October and December 2015.

== Point distribution ==
Tournament Category	W	F	SF	QF	R16	R32
Futures 15,000+H	35	20	10	4	1	0
Futures 15,000	27	15	8	3	1	0
Futures 10,000+H	27	15	8	3	1	0
Futures 10,000	18	10	6	2	1	0

== Key ==
$15,000 tournaments
$10,000 tournaments

== Month ==
=== October ===
Week of	Tournament	Winner	Runners-up	Semifinalists	Quarterfinalists
October 5	Australia F7 Futures; Cairns, Australia; Clay $15,000	(New Zealand) Finn Tearney; 6–7^{(5–7)}, 6–3, 6–3	(Australia) Alex Bolt	(China) Li Zhe (Australia) Christopher O'Connell	(Australia) Omar Jasika (Japan) Akira Santillan (Australia) Gavin van Peperzeel (Australia) Maverick Banes
October 5	Australia F7 Futures; Cairns, Australia; Clay $15,000	(China) Gao Xin (China) Li Zhe; 6–1, 6–2	(New Zealand) Finn Tearney (Japan) Yusuke Watanuki	(China) Li Zhe (Australia) Christopher O'Connell	(Australia) Omar Jasika (Japan) Akira Santillan (Australia) Gavin van Peperzeel (Australia) Maverick Banes
October 5	France F21 Futures; Nevers, France; Clay $15,000+H	(Czech Republic) Jan Mertl; 6–4, 7–6^{(7–4)}	(France) Grégoire Barrère	(France) Vincent Millot (Russia) Daniil Medvedev	(France) Alexandre Sidorenko (Austria) Maximilian Neuchrist (France) Jonathan Eysseric (France) Tom Jomby
October 5	France F21 Futures; Nevers, France; Clay $15,000+H	(Netherlands) Sander Arends (Netherlands) Niels Lootsma; 6–4, 7–5	(France) Jonathan Eysseric (France) Tom Jomby	(France) Vincent Millot (Russia) Daniil Medvedev	(France) Alexandre Sidorenko (Austria) Maximilian Neuchrist (France) Jonathan Eysseric (France) Tom Jomby
October 5	Kazakhstan F5 Futures; Shymkent, Kazakhstan; Clay $15,000	(Georgia (country)) Aleksandre Metreveli; 6–1, 6–2	(Russia) Ivan Gakhov	(Uzbekistan) Jurabek Karimov (Bulgaria) Alexandar Lazov	(Russia) Markos Kalovelonis (Kazakhstan) Timur Khabibulin (Netherlands) Paul Monteban (Uzbekistan) Sanjar Fayziev
October 5	Kazakhstan F5 Futures; Shymkent, Kazakhstan; Clay $15,000	(Russia) Ivan Gakhov (Georgia (country)) Aleksandre Metreveli; 7–6^{(7–4)}, 6–3	(Russia) Markos Kalovelonis (Bulgaria) Alexandar Lazov	(Uzbekistan) Jurabek Karimov (Bulgaria) Alexandar Lazov	(Russia) Markos Kalovelonis (Kazakhstan) Timur Khabibulin (Netherlands) Paul Monteban (Uzbekistan) Sanjar Fayziev
October 5	Philippines F1 Futures; Manila, Philippines; Clay $15,000	(Japan) Makoto Ochi; 6–2, 6–1	(Japan) Kento Takeuchi	(Spain) Enrique López Pérez (Australia) Harry Bourchier	(Chinese Taipei) Hung Jui-chen (Japan) Issei Okamura (Japan) Arata Onozawa (Japan) Hiromasa Oku
October 5	Philippines F1 Futures; Manila, Philippines; Clay $15,000	(Australia) Harry Bourchier (Spain) Enrique López Pérez; 6–4, 6–3	(Japan) Issei Okamura (Japan) Kento Takeuchi	(Spain) Enrique López Pérez (Australia) Harry Bourchier	(Chinese Taipei) Hung Jui-chen (Japan) Issei Okamura (Japan) Arata Onozawa (Japan) Hiromasa Oku
October 5	Portugal F13 Futures; Porto, Portugal; Clay $15,000	(Belgium) Arthur De Greef; 6–4, 6–0	(Portugal) João Domingues	(France) Maxime Chazal (Spain) Ricardo Ojeda Lara	(Spain) Marc Giner (Portugal) André Gaspar Murta (Portugal) Nuno Deus (Spain) Javier Martí
October 5	Portugal F13 Futures; Porto, Portugal; Clay $15,000	(Spain) Iván Arenas-Gualda (Spain) David Vega Hernández; 6–3, 6–0	(Portugal) Nuno Deus (Portugal) João Domingues	(France) Maxime Chazal (Spain) Ricardo Ojeda Lara	(Spain) Marc Giner (Portugal) André Gaspar Murta (Portugal) Nuno Deus (Spain) Javier Martí
October 5	USA F29 Futures; Mansfield, United States; Hard $15,000	(United Kingdom) Cameron Norrie; 7–5, 3–6, 6–4	(United States) Alexios Halebian	(United States) Michael Mmoh (Australia) Aleksandar Vukic	(United Kingdom) Liam Broady (Mexico) Lucas Gómez (South Africa) Nicolaas Scholtz (United States) Nick Chappell
October 5	USA F29 Futures; Mansfield, United States; Hard $15,000	(Mexico) Hans Hach Verdugo (United States) Eric Quigley; 7–5, 6–3	(United Kingdom) Liam Broady (Australia) Ashley Fisher	(United States) Michael Mmoh (Australia) Aleksandar Vukic	(United Kingdom) Liam Broady (Mexico) Lucas Gómez (South Africa) Nicolaas Scholtz (United States) Nick Chappell
October 5	Chile F6 Futures; Santiago, Chile; Clay $10,000	(Chile) Guillermo Rivera Aránguiz; 6–3, 4–6, 7–5	(Chile) Jorge Aguilar	(Chile) Victor Núñez (Chile) Cristóbal Saavedra	(Argentina) Nicolás Alberto Arreche (Chile) Vicente Lagos (Chile) Marcelo Tomás Barrios Vera (Argentina) Juan Manuel Matute
October 5	Chile F6 Futures; Santiago, Chile; Clay $10,000	(Chile) Jorge Aguilar (Chile) Victor Núñez; Walkover	(Chile) Marcelo Tomás Barrios Vera (Chile) Jorge Montero	(Chile) Victor Núñez (Chile) Cristóbal Saavedra	(Argentina) Nicolás Alberto Arreche (Chile) Vicente Lagos (Chile) Marcelo Tomás Barrios Vera (Argentina) Juan Manuel Matute
October 5	Egypt F34 Futures; Sharm El Sheikh, Egypt; Hard $10,000	(France) Gleb Sakharov; 6–2, Retired	(Czech Republic) Jaroslav Pospíšil	(United Kingdom) Jonny O'Mara (Italy) Luca Pancaldi	(Belgium) Jonas Merckx (Switzerland) Siméon Rossier (France) Maxime Mora (Poland) Kamil Gajewski
October 5	Egypt F34 Futures; Sharm El Sheikh, Egypt; Hard $10,000	(United Kingdom) Scott Clayton (United Kingdom) Jonny O'Mara; 7–6^{(10–8)}, 6–1	(Poland) Karol Drzewiecki (Poland) Maciej Smoła	(United Kingdom) Jonny O'Mara (Italy) Luca Pancaldi	(Belgium) Jonas Merckx (Switzerland) Siméon Rossier (France) Maxime Mora (Poland) Kamil Gajewski
October 5	Germany F15 Futures; Leimen, Germany; Hard $10,000	(Germany) Mats Moraing; 6–4, 3–6, 6–2	(Germany) Jan Choinski	(Poland) Andriej Kapaś (Germany) Yannick Maden	(Germany) Dominik Böhler (France) Teri Groll (Germany) Matthias Wunner (France) Antoine Escoffier
October 5	Germany F15 Futures; Leimen, Germany; Hard $10,000	(Germany) Tom Schönenberg (Germany) Matthias Wunner; 6–1, 6–1	(Poland) Andriej Kapaś (Russia) Evgeny Karlovskiy	(Poland) Andriej Kapaś (Germany) Yannick Maden	(Germany) Dominik Böhler (France) Teri Groll (Germany) Matthias Wunner (France) Antoine Escoffier
October 5	Italy F30 Futures; Pula, Italy; Clay $10,000	(Italy) Matteo Berrettini; 4–6, 6–3, 6–3	(Italy) Andrea Basso	(Italy) Riccardo Sinicropi (Italy) Walter Trusendi	(Italy) Gianluca Naso (Italy) Riccardo Bonadio (Croatia) Viktor Galović (Italy) Erik Crepaldi
October 5	Italy F30 Futures; Pula, Italy; Clay $10,000	(Italy) Matteo Berrettini (Italy) Andrea Pellegrino; Walkover	(Italy) Filippo Baldi (Italy) Gianluca Naso	(Italy) Riccardo Sinicropi (Italy) Walter Trusendi	(Italy) Gianluca Naso (Italy) Riccardo Bonadio (Croatia) Viktor Galović (Italy) Erik Crepaldi
October 5	Spain F32 Futures; Sant Cugat del Vallès, Spain; Clay $10,000	(Canada) Steven Diez; 6–1, 6–0	(Spain) Marcos Giraldi Requena	(Spain) Juan Lizariturry (Spain) Eduard Esteve Lobato	(United Kingdom) Alexander Ward (Germany) Jean-Marc Werner (Norway) Viktor Durasovic (Spain) Pol Toledo Bagué
October 5	Spain F32 Futures; Sant Cugat del Vallès, Spain; Clay $10,000	(Spain) Sergio Martos Gornés (Spain) Pol Toledo Bagué; 6–2, 6–3	(Spain) Andrés Artuñedo (Canada) Steven Diez	(Spain) Juan Lizariturry (Spain) Eduard Esteve Lobato	(United Kingdom) Alexander Ward (Germany) Jean-Marc Werner (Norway) Viktor Durasovic (Spain) Pol Toledo Bagué
October 5	Tunisia F26 Futures; Port El Kantaoui, Tunisia; Clay $10,000	(Spain) Roberto Ortega Olmedo; 6–1, 6–2	(Netherlands) Tallon Griekspoor	(France) Yannick Jankovits (Réunion) Quentin Robert	(Italy) Francesco Vilardo (France) Benjamin Bonzi (Lithuania) Lukas Mugevičius (Austria) Bastian Trinker
October 5	Tunisia F26 Futures; Port El Kantaoui, Tunisia; Clay $10,000	(France) Benjamin Bonzi (France) Fabien Reboul; 4–6, 6–4, [10–8]	(Lithuania) Lukas Mugevičius (Spain) Roberto Ortega Olmedo	(France) Yannick Jankovits (Réunion) Quentin Robert	(Italy) Francesco Vilardo (France) Benjamin Bonzi (Lithuania) Lukas Mugevičius (Austria) Bastian Trinker
October 5	Turkey F40 Futures; Antalya, Turkey; Hard $10,000	(Netherlands) Tim van Rijthoven; 6–3, 4–6, 6–4	(India) Ramkumar Ramanathan	(Turkey) Cem İlkel (Kazakhstan) Dmitry Popko	(Belgium) Alexandre Folie (Austria) Pascal Brunner (Switzerland) Luca Margaroli (Austria) Lucas Miedler
October 5	Turkey F40 Futures; Antalya, Turkey; Hard $10,000	(Italy) Enrico Dalla Valle (Italy) Julian Ocleppo; 6–3, 7–5	(Austria) Pascal Brunner (Austria) Lucas Miedler	(Turkey) Cem İlkel (Kazakhstan) Dmitry Popko	(Belgium) Alexandre Folie (Austria) Pascal Brunner (Switzerland) Luca Margaroli (Austria) Lucas Miedler
October 5	Ukraine F5 Futures; Cherkasy, Ukraine; Clay $10,000	(Russia) Ivan Nedelko; 6–3, 6–3	(Ukraine) Volodymyr Uzhylovskyi	(Ukraine) Dmytro Badanov (Ukraine) Marat Deviatiarov	(Ukraine) Vadim Alekseenko (Czech Republic) Filip Brtnický (Chile) Bastián Malla (Ukraine) Alexandr Kushakov
October 5	Ukraine F5 Futures; Cherkasy, Ukraine; Clay $10,000	(Ukraine) Marat Deviatiarov (Czech Republic) Libor Salaba; 1–6, 6–4, [10–7]	(Ukraine) Vladyslav Manafov (Ukraine) Volodymyr Uzhylovskyi	(Ukraine) Dmytro Badanov (Ukraine) Marat Deviatiarov	(Ukraine) Vadim Alekseenko (Czech Republic) Filip Brtnický (Chile) Bastián Malla (Ukraine) Alexandr Kushakov
October 12	Australia F8 Futures; Toowoomba, Australia; Hard $15,000	(Czech Republic) Robin Staněk; 6–2, 6–2	(New Zealand) Finn Tearney	(Australia) Dayne Kelly (Australia) Bradley Mousley	(Australia) Alex Bolt (China) Gao Xin (Japan) Akira Santillan (China) Li Zhe
October 12	Australia F8 Futures; Toowoomba, Australia; Hard $15,000	(Australia) Steven de Waard (Australia) Marc Polmans; 6–4, 6–3	(Australia) Jake Delaney (Australia) Max Purcell	(Australia) Dayne Kelly (Australia) Bradley Mousley	(Australia) Alex Bolt (China) Gao Xin (Japan) Akira Santillan (China) Li Zhe
October 12	Belarus F3 Futures; Minsk, Belarus; Hard $15,000	(Belarus) Dzmitry Zhyrmont; 6–1, 6–4	(United States) Stefan Kozlov	(Russia) Evgeny Elistratov (Turkey) Barış Ergüden	(Belarus) Maxim Tybar (Russia) Alexander Perfilov (Russia) Yan Sabanin (Russia) Pavel Kotov
October 12	Belarus F3 Futures; Minsk, Belarus; Hard $15,000	(Belarus) Andrei Vasilevski (Belarus) Dzmitry Zhyrmont; 6–2, 6–4	(Ukraine) Danylo Kalenichenko (Slovakia) Adrian Sikora	(Russia) Evgeny Elistratov (Turkey) Barış Ergüden	(Belarus) Maxim Tybar (Russia) Alexander Perfilov (Russia) Yan Sabanin (Russia) Pavel Kotov
October 12	France F22 Futures; Saint-Dizier, France; Hard $15,000	(Belgium) Niels Desein; 4–6, 6–3, 6–4	(United States) Peter Kobelt	(Republic of Ireland) Sam Barry (France) Grégoire Barrère	(Norway) Viktor Durasovic (Belgium) Omar Salman (Belgium) Clément Geens (Canada) Filip Peliwo
October 12	France F22 Futures; Saint-Dizier, France; Hard $15,000	(Netherlands) Sander Arends (Netherlands) Niels Lootsma; 7–5, 7–6^{(10–8)}	(France) Ronan Joncour (Portugal) Gonçalo Oliveira	(Republic of Ireland) Sam Barry (France) Grégoire Barrère	(Norway) Viktor Durasovic (Belgium) Omar Salman (Belgium) Clément Geens (Canada) Filip Peliwo
October 12	Kazakhstan F6 Futures; Shymkent, Kazakhstan; Clay $15,000	(Kazakhstan) Dmitry Popko; 6–4, 2–0, Retired	(Georgia (country)) Aleksandre Metreveli	(Russia) Ivan Gakhov (Russia) Anton Galkin	(Russia) Markos Kalovelonis (Bulgaria) Alexandar Lazov (Kazakhstan) Roman Khassanov (Kazakhstan) Timur Khabibulin
October 12	Kazakhstan F6 Futures; Shymkent, Kazakhstan; Clay $15,000	(Russia) Ivan Gakhov (Belarus) Yaraslav Shyla; 6–3, 6–3	(Russia) Alexander Boborykin (Russia) Timur Kiuamov	(Russia) Ivan Gakhov (Russia) Anton Galkin	(Russia) Markos Kalovelonis (Bulgaria) Alexandar Lazov (Kazakhstan) Roman Khassanov (Kazakhstan) Timur Khabibulin
October 12	Philippines F2 Futures; Manila, Philippines; Clay $15,000	(Spain) Enrique López Pérez; 7–6^{(7–4)}, 6–4	(Japan) Kento Takeuchi	(Japan) Arata Onozawa (Japan) Makoto Ochi	(Philippines) Francis Casey Alcantara (India) Kunal Anand (Chinese Taipei) Yu Cheng-yu (Japan) Katsuki Nagao
October 12	Philippines F2 Futures; Manila, Philippines; Clay $15,000	(Philippines) Francis Casey Alcantara (Philippines) Johnny Arcilla; 6–2, 6–2	(Japan) Katsuki Nagao (Japan) Hiromasa Oku	(Japan) Arata Onozawa (Japan) Makoto Ochi	(Philippines) Francis Casey Alcantara (India) Kunal Anand (Chinese Taipei) Yu Cheng-yu (Japan) Katsuki Nagao
October 12	USA F30 Futures; Houston, United States; Hard $15,000	(United States) Michael Mmoh; 6–3, 6–2	(Mexico) Lucas Gómez	(United States) Deiton Baughman (India) Rishab Agarwal	(United States) Eric Quigley (Hungary) Péter Nagy (United States) Wil Spencer (Australia) Matt Reid
October 12	USA F30 Futures; Houston, United States; Hard $15,000	(United States) Deiton Baughman (Mexico) Hans Hach Verdugo; 6–2, 6–0	(Sweden) Adam Gustavsson (United States) David Warren	(United States) Deiton Baughman (India) Rishab Agarwal	(United States) Eric Quigley (Hungary) Péter Nagy (United States) Wil Spencer (Australia) Matt Reid
October 12	Chile F7 Futures; Rancagua, Chile; Clay $10,000	(Chile) Gonzalo Lama; 6–3, 6–4	(Germany) Nico Matic	(Argentina) Nicolás Alberto Arreche (Peru) Juan Pablo Varillas	(Chile) Juan Carlos Sáez (Bolivia) Rodrigo Banzer (Brazil) Carlos Eduardo Severino (Chile) Guillermo Rivera Aránguiz
October 12	Chile F7 Futures; Rancagua, Chile; Clay $10,000	(Chile) Mauricio Álvarez-Guzmán (Chile) Juan Carlos Sáez; 6–3, 6–7^{(4–7)}, [10–7]	(Chile) Guillermo Rivera Aránguiz (Chile) Cristóbal Saavedra Corvalán	(Argentina) Nicolás Alberto Arreche (Peru) Juan Pablo Varillas	(Chile) Juan Carlos Sáez (Bolivia) Rodrigo Banzer (Brazil) Carlos Eduardo Severino (Chile) Guillermo Rivera Aránguiz
October 12	Egypt F35 Futures; Sharm El Sheikh, Egypt; Hard $10,000	(France) Gleb Sakharov; 7–6^{(8–6)}, 6–2	(United Kingdom) Jamie Whiteford	(United Kingdom) Scott Clayton (United Kingdom) Luke Bambridge	(Poland) Kamil Gajewski (Switzerland) Antoine Bellier (Serbia) Petar Čonkić (United Kingdom) Richard Gabb
October 12	Egypt F35 Futures; Sharm El Sheikh, Egypt; Hard $10,000	(Egypt) Karim-Mohamed Maamoun (Egypt) Sherif Sabry; 6–4, 4–6, [10–6]	(United Kingdom) Luke Bambridge (United Kingdom) Richard Gabb	(United Kingdom) Scott Clayton (United Kingdom) Luke Bambridge	(Poland) Kamil Gajewski (Switzerland) Antoine Bellier (Serbia) Petar Čonkić (United Kingdom) Richard Gabb
October 12	Germany F16 Futures; Bad Salzdetfurth, Germany; Carpet $10,000	(Germany) Matthias Wunner; 6–7^{(5–7)}, 6–4, 6–2	(Poland) Andriej Kapaś	(Germany) Mats Moraing (Czech Republic) Petr Michnev	(Germany) Tom Schönenberg (Germany) Oscar Otte (Belgium) Christopher Heyman (Latvia) Mārtiņš Podžus
October 12	Germany F16 Futures; Bad Salzdetfurth, Germany; Carpet $10,000	(Czech Republic) Petr Michnev (Czech Republic) Pavel Nejedlý; 6–4, 6–2	(Latvia) Jānis Podžus (Latvia) Mārtiņš Podžus	(Germany) Mats Moraing (Czech Republic) Petr Michnev	(Germany) Tom Schönenberg (Germany) Oscar Otte (Belgium) Christopher Heyman (Latvia) Mārtiņš Podžus
October 12	Greece F7 Futures; Heraklion, Greece; Hard $10,000	(United Kingdom) Lloyd Glasspool; 6–4, 6–3	(Serbia) Miki Janković	(Germany) Nils Brinkman (Switzerland) Yann Marti	(Bosnia and Herzegovina) Nerman Fatić (Serbia) Ivan Bjelica (Czech Republic) Václav Šafránek (France) Théo Fournerie
October 12	Greece F7 Futures; Heraklion, Greece; Hard $10,000	(United Kingdom) Lloyd Glasspool (United Kingdom) Joshua Ward-Hibbert; 6–3, 7–5	(Republic of Ireland) Peter Bothwell (United Kingdom) Toby Martin	(Germany) Nils Brinkman (Switzerland) Yann Marti	(Bosnia and Herzegovina) Nerman Fatić (Serbia) Ivan Bjelica (Czech Republic) Václav Šafránek (France) Théo Fournerie
October 12	Israel F13 Futures; Tel Aviv, Israel; Hard $10,000	(France) Tom Jomby; 7–6^{(7–5)}, 6–4	(Belgium) Julien Dubail	(Israel) Edan Leshem (Canada) Martin Beran	(United States) Max Schnur (Israel) Bar Tzuf Botzer (France) Mick Lescure (Israel) Ben Patael
October 12	Israel F13 Futures; Tel Aviv, Israel; Hard $10,000	(South Africa) Keith-Patrick Crowley (United States) Max Schnur; 6–7^{(1–7)}, 6–3, [10–3]	(United States) Eric James Johnson (United States) John Lamble	(Israel) Edan Leshem (Canada) Martin Beran	(United States) Max Schnur (Israel) Bar Tzuf Botzer (France) Mick Lescure (Israel) Ben Patael
October 12	Italy F31 Futures; Pula, Italy; Clay $10,000	(Montenegro) Ljubomir Čelebić; 7–6^{(7–3)}, 4–6, 6–2	(Italy) Omar Giacalone	(Italy) Andrea Guerrieri (Italy) Gianluca Mager	(Italy) Erik Crepaldi (Italy) Riccardo Bonadio (Italy) Riccardo Sinicropi (Italy) Simone Roncalli
October 12	Italy F31 Futures; Pula, Italy; Clay $10,000	(Germany) Leon Schutt (Germany) George von Massow; 1–6, 6–1, [11–9]	(Italy) Omar Giacalone (Italy) Pietro Rondoni	(Italy) Andrea Guerrieri (Italy) Gianluca Mager	(Italy) Erik Crepaldi (Italy) Riccardo Bonadio (Italy) Riccardo Sinicropi (Italy) Simone Roncalli
October 12	Spain F33 Futures; Madrid, Spain; Hard $10,000	(Spain) Roberto Ortega Olmedo; 5–7, 7–5, 6–2	(Spain) Carlos Gómez-Herrera	(Spain) Jaume Pla Malfeito (United Kingdom) Alexander Ward	(Spain) David Vega Hernández (Spain) Javier Pulgar-García (Spain) Eduard Esteve Lobato (United Kingdom) Matthew Short
October 12	Spain F33 Futures; Madrid, Spain; Hard $10,000	(Spain) Juan Lizariturry (United Kingdom) Matthew Short; 6–4, 3–6, [10–3]	(Spain) Iván Arenas-Gualda (Spain) Carlos Gómez-Herrera	(Spain) Jaume Pla Malfeito (United Kingdom) Alexander Ward	(Spain) David Vega Hernández (Spain) Javier Pulgar-García (Spain) Eduard Esteve Lobato (United Kingdom) Matthew Short
October 12	Tunisia F27 Futures; Port El Kantaoui, Tunisia; Hard $10,000	(France) Yannick Jankovits; 6–4, 6–7^{(5–7)}, 6–3	(United Kingdom) Evan Hoyt	(France) Benjamin Bonzi (Austria) Bastian Trinker	(France) Fabien Reboul (Austria) Peter Goldsteiner (Tunisia) Anis Ghorbel (United States) Maksim Tikhomirov
October 12	Tunisia F27 Futures; Port El Kantaoui, Tunisia; Hard $10,000	(France) Benjamin Bonzi (France) Fabien Reboul; 6–2, 6–2	(Tunisia) Aziz Dougaz (Tunisia) Anis Ghorbel	(France) Benjamin Bonzi (Austria) Bastian Trinker	(France) Fabien Reboul (Austria) Peter Goldsteiner (Tunisia) Anis Ghorbel (United States) Maksim Tikhomirov
October 12	Turkey F41 Futures; Antalya, Turkey; Hard $10,000	(Russia) Kirill Dmitriev; 6–2, 0–6, 6–4	(Slovakia) Alex Molčan	(India) Ramkumar Ramanathan (Netherlands) Tim van Rijthoven	(Turkey) Anıl Yüksel (Czech Republic) Dušan Lojda (United Kingdom) David Rice (Slovakia) Martin Blaško
October 12	Turkey F41 Futures; Antalya, Turkey; Hard $10,000	(Turkey) Sarp Ağabigün (India) Ramkumar Ramanathan; 6–4, 6–4	(Russia) Kirill Dmitriev (Switzerland) Luca Margaroli	(India) Ramkumar Ramanathan (Netherlands) Tim van Rijthoven	(Turkey) Anıl Yüksel (Czech Republic) Dušan Lojda (United Kingdom) David Rice (Slovakia) Martin Blaško
October 12	Ukraine F6 Futures; Cherkasy, Ukraine; Clay $10,000	(Russia) Ivan Nedelko; 7–5, 6–4	(Bulgaria) Vasko Mladenov	(Ukraine) Volodymyr Uzhylovskyi (Ukraine) Vitaliy Sachko	(Ukraine) Vitalii Shcherba (Italy) Daniele Capecchi (Ukraine) Marat Deviatiarov (Ukraine) Vadim Alekseenko
October 12	Ukraine F6 Futures; Cherkasy, Ukraine; Clay $10,000	(Ukraine) Marat Deviatiarov (Czech Republic) Libor Salaba; 6–4, 6–3	(Ukraine) Vitaliy Sachko (Ukraine) Vitalii Shcherba	(Ukraine) Volodymyr Uzhylovskyi (Ukraine) Vitaliy Sachko	(Ukraine) Vitalii Shcherba (Italy) Daniele Capecchi (Ukraine) Marat Deviatiarov (Ukraine) Vadim Alekseenko
October 19	Australia F9 Futures; Brisbane, Australia; Hard $15,000	(Australia) Gavin van Peperzeel; 7–6^{(8–6)}, 2–6, 7–6^{(9–7)}	(Australia) Luke Saville	(Australia) Christopher O'Connell (Australia) Benjamin Mitchell	(Australia) Bradley Mousley (Australia) Alex Bolt (Australia) Thomas John Fancutt (China) Li Zhe
October 19	Australia F9 Futures; Brisbane, Australia; Hard $15,000	(Australia) Steven de Waard (Australia) Marc Polmans; 6–0, 6–1	(Australia) Thomas John Fancutt (Australia) Darren Polkinghorne	(Australia) Christopher O'Connell (Australia) Benjamin Mitchell	(Australia) Bradley Mousley (Australia) Alex Bolt (Australia) Thomas John Fancutt (China) Li Zhe
October 19	Belarus F4 Futures; Minsk, Belarus; Hard $15,000	(United States) Stefan Kozlov; 6–1, 7–6^{(7–1)}	(Belarus) Dzmitry Zhyrmont	(Slovakia) Adrian Sikora (Russia) Ivan Davydov	(Russia) Vladimir Korolev (Belarus) Andrei Vasilevski (Russia) Alexander Ovcharov (Russia) Evgenii Tiurnev
October 19	Belarus F4 Futures; Minsk, Belarus; Hard $15,000	(Belarus) Andrei Vasilevski (Belarus) Dzmitry Zhyrmont; 6–3, 6–3	(Belarus) Maxim Dubarenco (Russia) Evgenii Tiurnev	(Slovakia) Adrian Sikora (Russia) Ivan Davydov	(Russia) Vladimir Korolev (Belarus) Andrei Vasilevski (Russia) Alexander Ovcharov (Russia) Evgenii Tiurnev
October 19	France F23 Futures; Rodez, France; Hard $15,000+H	(Italy) Lorenzo Giustino; 6–3, 6–7^{(2–7)}, 6–1	(France) Grégoire Barrère	(Canada) Filip Peliwo (Benin) Alexis Klégou	(Italy) Matteo Viola (France) Grégoire Burquier (Belgium) Julien Cagnina (Belgium) Clément Geens
October 19	France F23 Futures; Rodez, France; Hard $15,000+H	(Canada) Filip Peliwo (France) Fabien Reboul; 6–7^{(2–7)}, 6–4, [10–4]	(France) Jonathan Eysseric (France) Tom Jomby	(Canada) Filip Peliwo (Benin) Alexis Klégou	(Italy) Matteo Viola (France) Grégoire Burquier (Belgium) Julien Cagnina (Belgium) Clément Geens
October 19	Egypt F36 Futures; Sharm El Sheikh, Egypt; Hard $10,000	(United Kingdom) Richard Gabb; 3–6, 6–1, 6–1	(Poland) Pawel Ciaś	(Portugal) Frederico Ferreira Silva (India) Sasikumar Mukund	(Belgium) Jonas Merckx (Italy) Andrea Vavassori (Portugal) André Gaspar Murta (Italy) Giorgio Ricca
October 19	Egypt F36 Futures; Sharm El Sheikh, Egypt; Hard $10,000	(Portugal) André Gaspar Murta (Portugal) Frederico Ferreira Silva; 7–6^{(7–4)}, 6–3	(United Kingdom) Luke Bambridge (United Kingdom) Richard Gabb	(Portugal) Frederico Ferreira Silva (India) Sasikumar Mukund	(Belgium) Jonas Merckx (Italy) Andrea Vavassori (Portugal) André Gaspar Murta (Italy) Giorgio Ricca
October 19	Germany F17 Futures; Oberhaching, Germany; Hard $10,000	(Germany) Jeremy Jahn; 6–3, 6–3	(Germany) Robin Kern	(Germany) Mats Moraing (Italy) Edoardo Eremin	(Czech Republic) Zdeněk Kolář (Netherlands) Niels Lootsma (Czech Republic) Dominik Süč (Germany) Hannes Wagner
October 19	Germany F17 Futures; Oberhaching, Germany; Hard $10,000	(Netherlands) Niels Lootsma (Netherlands) David Pel; 2–6, 6–4, [10–8]	(Germany) Johannes Härteis (Germany) Hannes Wagner	(Germany) Mats Moraing (Italy) Edoardo Eremin	(Czech Republic) Zdeněk Kolář (Netherlands) Niels Lootsma (Czech Republic) Dominik Süč (Germany) Hannes Wagner
October 19	Greece F8 Futures; Heraklion, Greece; Hard $10,000	(Czech Republic) Václav Šafránek; 7–6^{(10–8)}, 6–4	(Canada) Steven Diez	(United States) Gonzales Austin (Switzerland) Yann Marti	(United Kingdom) Lloyd Glasspool (Venezuela) Ricardo Rodríguez (Serbia) Ivan Bjelica (Italy) Matteo Berrettini
October 19	Greece F8 Futures; Heraklion, Greece; Hard $10,000	(United Kingdom) Lloyd Glasspool (United Kingdom) Joshua Ward-Hibbert; Walkover	(France) Corentin Denolly (France) Alexandre Müller	(United States) Gonzales Austin (Switzerland) Yann Marti	(United Kingdom) Lloyd Glasspool (Venezuela) Ricardo Rodríguez (Serbia) Ivan Bjelica (Italy) Matteo Berrettini
October 19	Israel F14 Futures; Ramat HaSharon, Israel; Hard $10,000	(Italy) Roberto Marcora; 7–5, 3–6, 7–6^{(7–4)}	(Belgium) Julien Dubail	(France) Mick Lescure (Israel) Bar Tzuf Botzer	(United Kingdom) Toby Martin (Israel) Edan Leshem (United States) John Lamble (Israel) Ben Patael
October 19	Israel F14 Futures; Ramat HaSharon, Israel; Hard $10,000	(Hungary) Gábor Borsos (Hungary) Ádám Kellner; 6–4, 7–6^{(9–7)}	(Israel) Harel Levy (Israel) Noam Okun	(France) Mick Lescure (Israel) Bar Tzuf Botzer	(United Kingdom) Toby Martin (Israel) Edan Leshem (United States) John Lamble (Israel) Ben Patael
October 19	Italy F32 Futures; Pula, Italy; Clay $10,000	(Italy) Lorenzo Sonego; 6–4, 6–1	(Germany) George von Massow	(Italy) Filippo Leonardi (Italy) Omar Giacalone	(Italy) Gianluca Naso (Italy) Francesco Borgo (France) Maxime Chazal (Italy) Pietro Licciardi
October 19	Italy F32 Futures; Pula, Italy; Clay $10,000	(Italy) Pietro Licciardi (Italy) Lorenzo Sonego; 7–6^{(7–5)}, 6–3	(Italy) Gianluca Di Nicola (Italy) Gian Marco Moroni	(Italy) Filippo Leonardi (Italy) Omar Giacalone	(Italy) Gianluca Naso (Italy) Francesco Borgo (France) Maxime Chazal (Italy) Pietro Licciardi
October 19	Norway F1 Futures; Oslo, Norway; Hard $10,000	(Netherlands) Scott Griekspoor; 1–6, 6–0, 7–5	(Sweden) Daniel Appelgren	(Germany) Elmar Ejupovic (Poland) Marcin Gawron	(Canada) Alejandro Tabilo (Norway) Casper Ruud (Germany) Jan Choinski (France) Antoine Escoffier
October 19	Norway F1 Futures; Oslo, Norway; Hard $10,000	(Croatia) Ivan Sabanov (Croatia) Matej Sabanov; 6–3, 6–4	(Netherlands) Scott Griekspoor (Netherlands) Tallon Griekspoor	(Germany) Elmar Ejupovic (Poland) Marcin Gawron	(Canada) Alejandro Tabilo (Norway) Casper Ruud (Germany) Jan Choinski (France) Antoine Escoffier
October 19	Spain F34 Futures; Melilla, Spain; Hard $10,000	(United Kingdom) Alexander Ward; 7–6^{(7–4)}, 5–7, 6–2	(Spain) Roberto Ortega Olmedo	(Spain) Pablo Vivero González (Spain) Ricardo Ojeda Lara	(Australia) Dan Dowson (Spain) Andrés Artuñedo (Spain) Borja Rodríguez-Manzano (Spain) Iván Arenas-Gualda
October 19	Spain F34 Futures; Melilla, Spain; Hard $10,000	(Spain) Iván Arenas-Gualda (Spain) Roberto Ortega Olmedo; Walkover	(Spain) Jorge Hernando-Ruano (Spain) Ricardo Villacorta-Alonso	(Spain) Pablo Vivero González (Spain) Ricardo Ojeda Lara	(Australia) Dan Dowson (Spain) Andrés Artuñedo (Spain) Borja Rodríguez-Manzano (Spain) Iván Arenas-Gualda
October 19	Tunisia F28 Futures; Port El Kantaoui, Tunisia; Hard $10,000	(Spain) David Pérez Sanz; 6–4, 6–4	(France) Jonathan Kanar	(France) Florent Diep (United States) Maksim Tikhomirov	(France) François-Arthur Vibert (Tunisia) Anis Ghorbel (Italy) Nicola Ghedin (Monaco) Benjamin Balleret
October 19	Tunisia F28 Futures; Port El Kantaoui, Tunisia; Hard $10,000	(Belgium) Michael Geerts (Spain) David Pérez Sanz; 6–4, 6–4	(France) Jonathan Kanar (France) François-Arthur Vibert	(France) Florent Diep (United States) Maksim Tikhomirov	(France) François-Arthur Vibert (Tunisia) Anis Ghorbel (Italy) Nicola Ghedin (Monaco) Benjamin Balleret
October 19	Turkey F42 Futures; Antalya, Turkey; Hard $10,000	(Bulgaria) Dimitar Kuzmanov; 0–6, 7–6^{(10–8)}, 6–1	(Croatia) Mate Delić	(Romania) Dragoș Dima (Czech Republic) Vít Kopřiva	(Turkey) Altuğ Çelikbilek (Croatia) Duje Delić (Romania) Nicolae Frunză (Slovenia) Nik Razboršek
October 19	Turkey F42 Futures; Antalya, Turkey; Hard $10,000	(Romania) Andrei Ștefan Apostol (Romania) Nicolae Frunză; 7–6^{(7–0)}, 6–4	(Turkey) Fatih Taha Erün (Turkey) Barkın Yalçınkale	(Romania) Dragoș Dima (Czech Republic) Vít Kopřiva	(Turkey) Altuğ Çelikbilek (Croatia) Duje Delić (Romania) Nicolae Frunză (Slovenia) Nik Razboršek
October 26	Colombia F8 Futures; Bogotá, Colombia; Clay $15,000	(Colombia) Daniel Elahi Galán; 6–3, 3–2 Retired	(Colombia) Cristian Rodríguez	(Chile) Marcelo Tomás Barrios Vera (Argentina) Facundo Mena	(Chile) Jorge Montero (Bolivia) Alejandro Mendoza (Bolivia) Federico Zeballos (Colombia) Felipe Mantilla
October 26	Colombia F8 Futures; Bogotá, Colombia; Clay $15,000	(Colombia) Cristian Rodríguez (Colombia) Mateo Andrés Ruiz Naranjo; 7–6^{(7–3)}, 6–3	(Colombia) Juan Sebastián Gómez (Argentina) Facundo Mena	(Chile) Marcelo Tomás Barrios Vera (Argentina) Facundo Mena	(Chile) Jorge Montero (Bolivia) Alejandro Mendoza (Bolivia) Federico Zeballos (Colombia) Felipe Mantilla
October 26	Venezuela F1 Futures; Maracaibo, Venezuela; Hard $15,000	(Serbia) Peđa Krstin; 6–2, 6–1	(Venezuela) Luis David Martínez	(Argentina) Agustín Velotti (Argentina) Sebastián Exequiel Pini	(Argentina) Tomás Gerini (Argentina) Franco Emanuel Egea (Argentina) Maximiliano Estévez (New Zealand) Ben McLachlan
October 26	Venezuela F1 Futures; Maracaibo, Venezuela; Hard $15,000	(Venezuela) Luis David Martínez (Argentina) Agustín Velotti; 7–6^{(7–2)}, 6–1	(Argentina) Julián Busch (Argentina) Franco Feitt	(Argentina) Agustín Velotti (Argentina) Sebastián Exequiel Pini	(Argentina) Tomás Gerini (Argentina) Franco Emanuel Egea (Argentina) Maximiliano Estévez (New Zealand) Ben McLachlan
October 26	Brazil F6 Futures; Porto Alegre, Brazil; Clay $10,000	(Brazil) Carlos Eduardo Severino; 3–6, 6–3, 6–4	(Brazil) Marcelo Zormann	(Brazil) Rafael Camilo (Brazil) João Menezes	(Brazil) Wilson Leite (Brazil) André Miele (Brazil) Thales Turini (Brazil) Daniel Dutra da Silva
October 26	Brazil F6 Futures; Porto Alegre, Brazil; Clay $10,000	(Brazil) Orlando Luz (Brazil) Marcelo Zormann; 3–6, 6–3, [10–6]	(Brazil) Ricardo Hocevar (Brazil) Carlos Eduardo Severino	(Brazil) Rafael Camilo (Brazil) João Menezes	(Brazil) Wilson Leite (Brazil) André Miele (Brazil) Thales Turini (Brazil) Daniel Dutra da Silva
October 26	Egypt F37 Futures; Sharm El Sheikh, Egypt; Hard $10,000	(Portugal) Frederico Ferreira Silva; 7–5, 6–3	(Serbia) Marko Tepavac	(Belgium) Julien Dubail (France) Gleb Sakharov	(United Kingdom) Richard Gabb (Poland) Pawel Ciaś (Portugal) André Gaspar Murta (Italy) Andrea Vavassori
October 26	Egypt F37 Futures; Sharm El Sheikh, Egypt; Hard $10,000	(United Kingdom) Luke Bambridge (United Kingdom) Richard Gabb; 7–6^{(7–3)}, 6–4	(Italy) Enrico Dalla Valle (Italy) Julian Ocleppo	(Belgium) Julien Dubail (France) Gleb Sakharov	(United Kingdom) Richard Gabb (Poland) Pawel Ciaś (Portugal) André Gaspar Murta (Italy) Andrea Vavassori
October 26	Estonia F2 Futures; Tartu, Estonia; Carpet $10,000	(Netherlands) Antal van der Duim; 4–6, 6–1, 6–4	(Russia) Evgeny Karlovskiy	(Monaco) Lucas Catarina (Slovakia) Filip Horanský	(Belarus) Dzmitry Zhyrmont (Czech Republic) David Poljak (Belarus) Ivan Liutarevich (Estonia) Mattias Siimar
October 26	Estonia F2 Futures; Tartu, Estonia; Carpet $10,000	(Latvia) Miķelis Lībietis (Belarus) Dzmitry Zhyrmont; 7–6^{(7–2)}, 3–6, [10–4]	(Slovakia) Filip Horanský (Czech Republic) Petr Michnev	(Monaco) Lucas Catarina (Slovakia) Filip Horanský	(Belarus) Dzmitry Zhyrmont (Czech Republic) David Poljak (Belarus) Ivan Liutarevich (Estonia) Mattias Siimar
October 26	Germany F18 Futures; Ismaning, Germany; Carpet $10,000	(Bosnia and Herzegovina) Aldin Šetkić; 6–7^{(2–7)}, 7–6^{(8–6)}, 6–3	(Germany) Johannes Härteis	(Germany) Kevin Krawietz (Russia) Daniil Medvedev	(Germany) Marc Sieber (Germany) Oscar Otte (Netherlands) Niels Lootsma (Germany) Yannick Maden
October 26	Germany F18 Futures; Ismaning, Germany; Carpet $10,000	(Austria) Alexander Erler (Germany) Constantin Frantzen; 2–6, 7–6^{(7–5)}, [10–8]	(Germany) Kevin Krawietz (Germany) Tim Sandkaulen	(Germany) Kevin Krawietz (Russia) Daniil Medvedev	(Germany) Marc Sieber (Germany) Oscar Otte (Netherlands) Niels Lootsma (Germany) Yannick Maden
October 26	Greece F9 Futures; Heraklion, Greece; Hard $10,000	(Canada) Steven Diez; 6–2, 6–0	(Greece) Stefanos Tsitsipas	(Serbia) Miki Janković (Russia) Markos Kalovelonis	(United States) Winston Lin (Australia) Isaac Frost (Czech Republic) Václav Šafránek (Venezuela) Ricardo Rodríguez
October 26	Greece F9 Futures; Heraklion, Greece; Hard $10,000	(Bosnia and Herzegovina) Nerman Fatić (Serbia) Miki Janković; 6–3, 3–6, [10–4]	(Czech Republic) Filip Doležel (Czech Republic) Václav Šafránek	(Serbia) Miki Janković (Russia) Markos Kalovelonis	(United States) Winston Lin (Australia) Isaac Frost (Czech Republic) Václav Šafránek (Venezuela) Ricardo Rodríguez
October 26	Israel F15 Futures; Tel Aviv, Israel; Hard $10,000	(Israel) Edan Leshem; 6–1, 5–7, 6–3	(Netherlands) Lennert van der Linden	(United States) Eric James Johnson (Hungary) Gábor Borsos	(Israel) Yankel Zemel (United States) John Lamble (South Africa) Keith-Patrick Crowley (Israel) Bar Tzuf Botzer
October 26	Israel F15 Futures; Tel Aviv, Israel; Hard $10,000	(South Africa) Keith-Patrick Crowley (United States) Max Schnur; 7–6^{(7–5)}, 6–2	(Israel) Oz Daniel (United States) Eric James Johnson	(United States) Eric James Johnson (Hungary) Gábor Borsos	(Israel) Yankel Zemel (United States) John Lamble (South Africa) Keith-Patrick Crowley (Israel) Bar Tzuf Botzer
October 26	Italy F33 Futures; Pula, Italy; Clay $10,000	(Italy) Gianluca Mager; 6–3, 6–3	(Italy) Lorenzo Sonego	(Italy) Riccardo Sinicropi (Italy) Erik Crepaldi	(Montenegro) Ljubomir Čelebić (Italy) Marco Bortolotti (Italy) Francesco Picco (Italy) Federico Bonacia
October 26	Italy F33 Futures; Pula, Italy; Clay $10,000	(Italy) Francesco Borgo (Italy) Stefano Travaglia; 6–2, 7–6^{(7–3)}	(Italy) Erik Crepaldi (Italy) Daniele Pepe	(Italy) Riccardo Sinicropi (Italy) Erik Crepaldi	(Montenegro) Ljubomir Čelebić (Italy) Marco Bortolotti (Italy) Francesco Picco (Italy) Federico Bonacia
October 26	Norway F2 Futures; Oslo, Norway; Clay $10,000	(Netherlands) Scott Griekspoor; 6–2, 6–7^{(4–7)}, 7–5	(Norway) Viktor Durasovic	(Belgium) Joran Vliegen (Germany) Jan Choinski	(Italy) Federico Gaio (Sweden) Daniel Appelgren (Germany) Björn Petersen (Sweden) Milos Sekulic
October 26	Norway F2 Futures; Oslo, Norway; Clay $10,000	(Belgium) Sander Gillé (Belgium) Joran Vliegen; 6–7^{(4–7)}, 7–6^{(7–5)}, [10–8]	(Croatia) Ivan Sabanov (Croatia) Matej Sabanov	(Belgium) Joran Vliegen (Germany) Jan Choinski	(Italy) Federico Gaio (Sweden) Daniel Appelgren (Germany) Björn Petersen (Sweden) Milos Sekulic
October 26	Tunisia F29 Futures; Port El Kantaoui, Tunisia; Hard $10,000	(Spain) David Pérez Sanz; 3–6, 7–6^{(7–4)}, 6–3	(Kazakhstan) Dmitry Popko	(Spain) Roberto Ortega Olmedo (Italy) Nicola Ghedin	(France) Benjamin Bonzi (Portugal) João Domingues (France) Florent Diep (Spain) Alberto Romero de Ávila Senise
October 26	Tunisia F29 Futures; Port El Kantaoui, Tunisia; Hard $10,000	(France) Benjamin Bonzi (Spain) Roberto Ortega Olmedo; 6–0, 6–3	(Tunisia) Anis Ghorbel (Italy) Francesco Vilardo	(Spain) Roberto Ortega Olmedo (Italy) Nicola Ghedin	(France) Benjamin Bonzi (Portugal) João Domingues (France) Florent Diep (Spain) Alberto Romero de Ávila Senise
October 26	Turkey F43 Futures; Antalya, Turkey; Hard $10,000	(Belgium) Yannik Reuter; 5–7, 7–6^{(11–9)}, 7–6^{(7–2)}	(Turkey) Cem İlkel	(Romania) Nicolae Frunză (Romania) Andrei Ștefan Apostol	(Slovenia) Nik Razboršek (Turkey) Barkın Yalçınkale (Russia) Alexander Bublik (Russia) Alexander Boborykin
October 26	Turkey F43 Futures; Antalya, Turkey; Hard $10,000	(Russia) Alexander Bublik (Serbia) Darko Jandrić; 3–6, 6–4, [10–8]	(Turkey) Tuna Altuna (Turkey) Cem İlkel	(Romania) Nicolae Frunză (Romania) Andrei Ștefan Apostol	(Slovenia) Nik Razboršek (Turkey) Barkın Yalçınkale (Russia) Alexander Bublik (Russia) Alexander Boborykin

=== November ===
Week of	Tournament	Winner	Runners-up	Semifinalists	Quarterfinalists
November 2	Colombia F9 Futures; Valledupar, Colombia; Hard $15,000	(Mexico) Tigre Hank; 7–5, 6–0	(Chile) Marcelo Tomás Barrios Vera	(Mexico) Daniel Garza (Mexico) Manuel Sánchez	(Bolivia) Federico Zeballos (Japan) Kaichi Uchida (Chile) Jorge Montero (Colombia) Steffen Zornosa
November 2	Colombia F9 Futures; Valledupar, Colombia; Hard $15,000	(Mexico) Daniel Garza (Japan) Kaichi Uchida; 7–6^{(7–3)}, 5–7, [10–8]	(Mexico) Manuel Sánchez (Colombia) Federico Zeballos	(Mexico) Daniel Garza (Mexico) Manuel Sánchez	(Bolivia) Federico Zeballos (Japan) Kaichi Uchida (Chile) Jorge Montero (Colombia) Steffen Zornosa
November 2	Great Britain F10 Futures; Tipton, Great Britain; Hard (indoor) $15,000	(United Kingdom) Neil Pauffley; 6–4, 7–6^{(10–8)}	(United Kingdom) Lloyd Glasspool	(Republic of Ireland) Sam Barry (United Kingdom) Jonny O'Mara	(Italy) Lorenzo Giustino (United Kingdom) Evan Hoyt (United Kingdom) Edward Corrie (Italy) Matteo Viola
November 2	Great Britain F10 Futures; Tipton, Great Britain; Hard (indoor) $15,000	(United Kingdom) Billy Harris (United Kingdom) Evan Hoyt; 4–6, 6–3, [11–9]	(United Kingdom) Lloyd Glasspool (United Kingdom) Joshua Ward-Hibbert	(Republic of Ireland) Sam Barry (United Kingdom) Jonny O'Mara	(Italy) Lorenzo Giustino (United Kingdom) Evan Hoyt (United Kingdom) Edward Corrie (Italy) Matteo Viola
November 2	Venezuela F2 Futures; Maracay, Venezuela; Hard $15,000	(Serbia) Peđa Krstin; 6–3, 6–2	(Argentina) Agustín Velotti	(Guatemala) Christopher Díaz Figueroa (Argentina) Maximiliano Estévez	(Argentina) Mateo Nicolás Martínez (Argentina) Marino Kestelboim (Peru) Jorge Brian Panta (Peru) Mauricio Echazú
November 2	Venezuela F2 Futures; Maracay, Venezuela; Hard $15,000	(Venezuela) Luis David Martínez (Argentina) Agustín Velotti; 6–3, 6–4	(Peru) Jorge Brian Panta (Peru) Mauricio Echazú	(Guatemala) Christopher Díaz Figueroa (Argentina) Maximiliano Estévez	(Argentina) Mateo Nicolás Martínez (Argentina) Marino Kestelboim (Peru) Jorge Brian Panta (Peru) Mauricio Echazú
November 2	Brazil F7 Futures; Santa Maria, Brazil; Clay $10,000	(Brazil) João Menezes; 6–2, 7–6^{(7–5)}	(Brazil) Orlando Luz	(Brazil) Carlos Eduardo Severino (Brazil) André Miele	(Brazil) Bruno Sant'Anna (Brazil) Ricardo Hocevar (Brazil) Thales Turini (Brazil) Eduardo Dischinger
November 2	Brazil F7 Futures; Santa Maria, Brazil; Clay $10,000	(Brazil) Franco Ferreiro (Brazil) André Miele; 6–4, 0–6, [13–11]	(Brazil) Wilson Leite (Brazil) Bruno Sant'Anna	(Brazil) Carlos Eduardo Severino (Brazil) André Miele	(Brazil) Bruno Sant'Anna (Brazil) Ricardo Hocevar (Brazil) Thales Turini (Brazil) Eduardo Dischinger
November 2	Egypt F38 Futures; Sharm El Sheikh, Egypt; Hard $10,000	(Serbia) Marko Tepavac; 7–6^{(7–5)}, 6–1	(Portugal) Frederico Ferreira Silva	(Egypt) Mohamed Safwat (Argentina) Santiago Rodríguez Taverna	(Czech Republic) Libor Salaba (India) Sasikumar Mukund (Egypt) Sherif Sabry (Italy) Riccardo Bonadio
November 2	Egypt F38 Futures; Sharm El Sheikh, Egypt; Hard $10,000	(Egypt) Karim-Mohamed Maamoun (Czech Republic) Libor Salaba; 7–5, 6–3	(Poland) Maciej Nowak (Czech Republic) Tomáš Papík	(Egypt) Mohamed Safwat (Argentina) Santiago Rodríguez Taverna	(Czech Republic) Libor Salaba (India) Sasikumar Mukund (Egypt) Sherif Sabry (Italy) Riccardo Bonadio
November 2	Estonia F3 Futures; Tallinn, Estonia; Hard (indoor) $10,000	(Belarus) Dzmitry Zhyrmont; 4–6, 6–4, 6–0	(Belgium) Clément Geens	(Russia) Evgenii Tiurnev (Germany) Hannes Wagner	(Russia) Anton Zaitcev (Estonia) Vladimir Ivanov (Czech Republic) Petr Michnev (Latvia) Mārtiņš Podžus
November 2	Estonia F3 Futures; Tallinn, Estonia; Hard (indoor) $10,000	(Netherlands) Niels Lootsma (Estonia) Kenneth Raisma; 4–6, 6–4, [10–8]	(Russia) Aleksandr Vasilenko (Russia) Anton Zaitcev	(Russia) Evgenii Tiurnev (Germany) Hannes Wagner	(Russia) Anton Zaitcev (Estonia) Vladimir Ivanov (Czech Republic) Petr Michnev (Latvia) Mārtiņš Podžus
November 2	Greece F10 Futures; Heraklion, Greece; Hard $10,000	(United States) Eric James Johnson; 6–4, 4–6, 6–4	(Netherlands) Tim van Rijthoven	(Switzerland) Johan Nikles (Bulgaria) Alexandar Lazov	(Slovenia) Maks Tekavec (Greece) Stefanos Tsitsipas (United States) Gonzales Austin (Russia) Matvey Khomentovskiy
November 2	Greece F10 Futures; Heraklion, Greece; Hard $10,000	(Greece) Konstantinos Economidis (Greece) Stefanos Tsitsipas; 6–2, 6–2	(Bulgaria) Alexandar Lazov (Czech Republic) Dominik Süč	(Switzerland) Johan Nikles (Bulgaria) Alexandar Lazov	(Slovenia) Maks Tekavec (Greece) Stefanos Tsitsipas (United States) Gonzales Austin (Russia) Matvey Khomentovskiy
November 2	Italy F34 Futures; Pula, Italy; Clay $10,000	(Italy) Francesco Picco; 6–2, 6–3	(Italy) Edoardo Eremin	(Italy) Roberto Marcora (Italy) Manuel Mazzella	(Italy) Andrea Guerrieri (Italy) Antonio Massara (Italy) Antonio Campo (Italy) Walter Trusendi
November 2	Italy F34 Futures; Pula, Italy; Clay $10,000	(Italy) Riccardo Sinicropi (Italy) Matteo Volante; 5–7, 6–4, [10–7]	(Italy) Erik Crepaldi (Italy) Francesco Moncagatto	(Italy) Roberto Marcora (Italy) Manuel Mazzella	(Italy) Andrea Guerrieri (Italy) Antonio Massara (Italy) Antonio Campo (Italy) Walter Trusendi
November 2	Norway F3 Futures; Oslo, Norway; Hard (indoor) $10,000	(Sweden) Carl Söderlund; 6–4, 6–2	(Belgium) Sander Gillé	(France) Antoine Escoffier (Croatia) Duje Kekez	(Sweden) Daniel Appelgren (Belgium) Joran Vliegen (Sweden) Jonathan Mridha (United States) Quinton Vega
November 2	Norway F3 Futures; Oslo, Norway; Hard (indoor) $10,000	(Belgium) Sander Gillé (Belgium) Joran Vliegen; 7–6^{(7–3)}, 6–1	(Croatia) Ivan Sabanov (Croatia) Matej Sabanov	(France) Antoine Escoffier (Croatia) Duje Kekez	(Sweden) Daniel Appelgren (Belgium) Joran Vliegen (Sweden) Jonathan Mridha (United States) Quinton Vega
November 2	South Africa F1Futures; Stellenbosch, South Africa; Hard $10,000	(South Africa) Nicolaas Scholtz; 7–6^{(7–5)}, 7–5	(Austria) Pascal Brunner	(Italy) Luca Pancaldi (Austria) Lucas Miedler	(South Africa) Keith-Patrick Crowley (South Africa) Lloyd Harris (United Kingdom) James Marsalek (Spain) Javier Pulgar-García
November 2	South Africa F1Futures; Stellenbosch, South Africa; Hard $10,000	(Austria) Pascal Brunner (Austria) Lucas Miedler; 6–3, 6–2	(South Africa) Chris Haggard (United States) Tyler Hochwalt	(Italy) Luca Pancaldi (Austria) Lucas Miedler	(South Africa) Keith-Patrick Crowley (South Africa) Lloyd Harris (United Kingdom) James Marsalek (Spain) Javier Pulgar-García
November 2	Tunisia F30 Futures; Port El Kantaoui, Tunisia; Hard $10,000	(Spain) Bernabé Zapata Miralles; 6–4, 6–4	(Tunisia) Anis Ghorbel	(Kazakhstan) Dmitry Popko (Russia) Kirill Dmitriev	(France) Ronan Joncour (France) Antoine Hoang (Netherlands) Tallon Griekspoor (Germany) Christoph Negritu
November 2	Tunisia F30 Futures; Port El Kantaoui, Tunisia; Hard $10,000	(Portugal) Felipe Cunha e Silva (Portugal) João Domingues; 7–6^{(7–4)}, 6–1	(Spain) Samuel Ribeiro Navarrete (Spain) Bernabé Zapata Miralles	(Kazakhstan) Dmitry Popko (Russia) Kirill Dmitriev	(France) Ronan Joncour (France) Antoine Hoang (Netherlands) Tallon Griekspoor (Germany) Christoph Negritu
November 2	Turkey F44 Futures; Antalya, Turkey; Clay $10,000	(Bosnia and Herzegovina) Tomislav Brkić; 7–5, 6–2	(Austria) Gibril Diarra	(Georgia (country)) Aleksandre Metreveli (Poland) Maciej Rajski	(Romania) Vasile Antonescu (Czech Republic) Dušan Lojda (Ukraine) Vadim Alekseenko (Uzbekistan) Sanjar Fayziev
November 2	Turkey F44 Futures; Antalya, Turkey; Clay $10,000	(Bosnia and Herzegovina) Tomislav Brkić (Serbia) Darko Jandrić; 7–6^{(7–3)}, 6–3	(Turkey) Tuna Altuna (Turkey) Cem İlkel	(Georgia (country)) Aleksandre Metreveli (Poland) Maciej Rajski	(Romania) Vasile Antonescu (Czech Republic) Dušan Lojda (Ukraine) Vadim Alekseenko (Uzbekistan) Sanjar Fayziev
November 2	USA F31 Futures; Birmingham, United States; Clay $10,000	(United States) Evan King; 6–4, 6–4	(Austria) Bastian Trinker	(Spain) David Biosca Girvent (United States) Jean-Yves Aubone	(United States) Alexios Halebian (India) Rishab Agarwal (Russia) Mikhail Vaks (United States) Evan Song
November 2	USA F31 Futures; Birmingham, United States; Clay $10,000	(United States) Cameron Silverman (United States) Wil Spencer; 6–3, 3–6, [10–3]	(United States) Jared Hiltzik (Poland) Piotr Łomacki	(Spain) David Biosca Girvent (United States) Jean-Yves Aubone	(United States) Alexios Halebian (India) Rishab Agarwal (Russia) Mikhail Vaks (United States) Evan Song
November 9	Australia F10 Futures; Wollongong, Australia; Hard $15,000	(Australia) Benjamin Mitchell; 6–1, 6–4	(Germany) Sebastian Fanselow	(New Zealand) Finn Tearney (New Zealand) José Statham	(United States) Connor Smith (Czech Republic) Robin Staněk (United States) Marcos Giron (Australia) Blake Mott
November 9	Australia F10 Futures; Wollongong, Australia; Hard $15,000	(Australia) Maverick Banes (New Zealand) Finn Tearney; 6–7^{(6–8)}, 7–5, [10–6]	(Australia) Steven de Waard (Australia) Marc Polmans	(New Zealand) Finn Tearney (New Zealand) José Statham	(United States) Connor Smith (Czech Republic) Robin Staněk (United States) Marcos Giron (Australia) Blake Mott
November 9	Brazil F8 Futures; Campos do Jordão, Brazil; Hard $15,000	(Brazil) Caio Zampieri; 1–6, 6–4, 7–5	(Brazil) Fernando Romboli	(Brazil) José Pereira (Brazil) Ricardo Hocevar	(Brazil) Pedro Sakamoto (Brazil) Alex Blumenberg (Brazil) Pedro Bernardi (Brazil) Alexandre Tsuchiya
November 9	Brazil F8 Futures; Campos do Jordão, Brazil; Hard $15,000	(Brazil) José Pereira (Brazil) Alexandre Tsuchiya; 6–3, 6–2	(Brazil) Pedro Bernardi (Brazil) Pedro Sakamoto	(Brazil) José Pereira (Brazil) Ricardo Hocevar	(Brazil) Pedro Sakamoto (Brazil) Alex Blumenberg (Brazil) Pedro Bernardi (Brazil) Alexandre Tsuchiya
November 9	Great Britain F11 Futures; Bath, Great Britain; Hard (indoor) $15,000	(Canada) Filip Peliwo; 2–6, 6–1, 6–2	(Germany) Mats Moraing	(United Kingdom) Richard Gabb (Belgium) Joris De Loore	(Slovenia) Tom Kočevar-Dešman (Republic of Ireland) Sam Barry (United Kingdom) Luke Bambridge (Belgium) Michael Geerts
November 9	Great Britain F11 Futures; Bath, Great Britain; Hard (indoor) $15,000	(United Kingdom) Lloyd Glasspool (United Kingdom) Joshua Ward-Hibbert; 6–4, 3–6, [10–2]	(Republic of Ireland) Sam Barry (Canada) Filip Peliwo	(United Kingdom) Richard Gabb (Belgium) Joris De Loore	(Slovenia) Tom Kočevar-Dešman (Republic of Ireland) Sam Barry (United Kingdom) Luke Bambridge (Belgium) Michael Geerts
November 9	Venezuela F3 Futures; Isla Margarita, Venezuela; Hard $15,000	(Barbados) Darian King; 6–3, 1–0, ret.	(Serbia) Peđa Krstin	(Argentina) Maximiliano Estévez (Guatemala) Christopher Díaz Figueroa	(Argentina) Mateo Nicolás Martínez (Venezuela) Miguel Ángel Este (Argentina) Mariano Kestelboim (Venezuela) Luis David Martínez
November 9	Venezuela F3 Futures; Isla Margarita, Venezuela; Hard $15,000	(Barbados) Darian King (Venezuela) Luis Fernando Ramírez; 6–2, 3–6, [10–7]	(Guatemala) Christopher Díaz Figueroa (Argentina) Franco Feitt	(Argentina) Maximiliano Estévez (Guatemala) Christopher Díaz Figueroa	(Argentina) Mateo Nicolás Martínez (Venezuela) Miguel Ángel Este (Argentina) Mariano Kestelboim (Venezuela) Luis David Martínez
November 9	Egypt F39 Futures; Sharm El Sheikh, Egypt; Hard $10,000	(Portugal) Frederico Ferreira Silva; 6–1, 6–2	(Serbia) Marko Tepavac	(Czech Republic) Libor Salaba (Egypt) Karim-Mohamed Maamoun	(Italy) Riccardo Bonadio (Ukraine) Vladyslav Manafov (Argentina) Santiago Rodríguez Taverna (Czech Republic) Václav Šafránek
November 9	Egypt F39 Futures; Sharm El Sheikh, Egypt; Hard $10,000	(Czech Republic) Tomáš Papík (Argentina) Santiago Rodríguez Taverna; 6–2, 7–5	(Ukraine) Vladyslav Manafov (Georgia (country)) George Tsivadze	(Czech Republic) Libor Salaba (Egypt) Karim-Mohamed Maamoun	(Italy) Riccardo Bonadio (Ukraine) Vladyslav Manafov (Argentina) Santiago Rodríguez Taverna (Czech Republic) Václav Šafránek
November 9	Estonia F4 Futures; Pärnu, Estonia; Hard (indoor) $10,000	(Czech Republic) Petr Michnev; 6–2, 6–1	(Netherlands) Antal van der Duim	(Sweden) Isak Arvidsson (Estonia) Kenneth Raisma	(Estonia) Vladimir Ivanov (Russia) Anton Zaitcev (Netherlands) Miliaan Niesten (Belgium) Clément Geens
November 9	Estonia F4 Futures; Pärnu, Estonia; Hard (indoor) $10,000	(Netherlands) Niels Lootsma (Estonia) Kenneth Raisma; 6–4, 6–3	(Estonia) Anton Pavlov (Estonia) Martin Valdo Randpere	(Sweden) Isak Arvidsson (Estonia) Kenneth Raisma	(Estonia) Vladimir Ivanov (Russia) Anton Zaitcev (Netherlands) Miliaan Niesten (Belgium) Clément Geens
November 9	Greece F11 Futures; Heraklion, Greece; Hard $10,000	(Netherlands) Tim van Rijthoven; 4–6, 6–3, 7–5	(United States) Gonzales Austin	(United States) Hunter Callahan (Germany) Sami Reinwein	(Greece) Stefanos Tsitsipas (Canada) Steven Diez (Russia) Roman Safiullin (United States) Winston Lin
November 9	Greece F11 Futures; Heraklion, Greece; Hard $10,000	(Greece) Konstantinos Economidis (Greece) Stefanos Tsitsipas; Walkover	(United States) Alexander Centenari (Germany) Sami Reinwein	(United States) Hunter Callahan (Germany) Sami Reinwein	(Greece) Stefanos Tsitsipas (Canada) Steven Diez (Russia) Roman Safiullin (United States) Winston Lin
November 9	Kuwait F1 Futures; Mishref, Kuwait; Hard $10,000	(Netherlands) Lennert van der Linden; 6–4, 7–6^{(7–1)}	(France) Hugo Grenier	(Italy) Alessandro Bega (Italy) Francesco Vilardo	(Sweden) Nils Heimer (Belgium) Jonas Merckx (Netherlands) Paul Monteban (Spain) Pol Toledo Bagué
November 9	Kuwait F1 Futures; Mishref, Kuwait; Hard $10,000	(Spain) Sergio Martos Gornés (Spain) Pol Toledo Bagué; 6–3, 6–0	(Italy) Alessandro Bega (Italy) Francesco Vilardo	(Italy) Alessandro Bega (Italy) Francesco Vilardo	(Sweden) Nils Heimer (Belgium) Jonas Merckx (Netherlands) Paul Monteban (Spain) Pol Toledo Bagué
November 9	Morocco F4 Futures; Casablanca, Morocco; Clay $10,000	(Italy) Stefano Travaglia; 6–4, 6–4	(France) Maxime Chazal	(Spain) Marcos Giraldi Requena (Morocco) Yassine Idmbarek	(Portugal) André Gaspar Murta (Italy) Giovanni Rizzuti (Spain) Carlos Boluda-Purkiss (Spain) Albert Alcaraz Ivorra
November 9	Morocco F4 Futures; Casablanca, Morocco; Clay $10,000	(Morocco) Amine Ahouda (Morocco) Yassine Idmbarek; 6–2, 1–6, [10–8]	(Portugal) Nuno Borges (Portugal) Francisco Cabral	(Spain) Marcos Giraldi Requena (Morocco) Yassine Idmbarek	(Portugal) André Gaspar Murta (Italy) Giovanni Rizzuti (Spain) Carlos Boluda-Purkiss (Spain) Albert Alcaraz Ivorra
November 9	South Africa F2 Futures; Stellenbosch, South Africa; Hard $10,000	(Austria) Lucas Miedler; 7–6^{(7–4)}, 6–1	(South Africa) Lloyd Harris	(Austria) Pascal Brunner (South Africa) Nicolaas Scholtz	(Italy) Luca Pancaldi (Austria) Bernd Kossler (United Kingdom) James Marsalek (Spain) Javier Pulgar-García
November 9	South Africa F2 Futures; Stellenbosch, South Africa; Hard $10,000	(Austria) Pascal Brunner (Austria) Lucas Miedler; 6–4, 6–2	(Austria) Peter Goldsteiner (Réunion) Quentin Robert	(Austria) Pascal Brunner (South Africa) Nicolaas Scholtz	(Italy) Luca Pancaldi (Austria) Bernd Kossler (United Kingdom) James Marsalek (Spain) Javier Pulgar-García
November 9	Tunisia F31 Futures; Port El Kantaoui, Tunisia; Hard $10,000	(Serbia) Nikola Milojević; 2–6, 7–5, 6–4	(France) Antoine Hoang	(Spain) David Pérez Sanz (Netherlands) Scott Griekspoor	(Spain) Samuel Ribeiro Navarrete (France) François-Arthur Vibert (Russia) Anton Galkin (Spain) Jaime Fermosell
November 9	Tunisia F31 Futures; Port El Kantaoui, Tunisia; Hard $10,000	(Venezuela) Jordi Muñoz Abreu (Spain) David Pérez Sanz; 6–4, 6–3	(Switzerland) Loïc Perret (France) Hugo Voljacques	(Spain) David Pérez Sanz (Netherlands) Scott Griekspoor	(Spain) Samuel Ribeiro Navarrete (France) François-Arthur Vibert (Russia) Anton Galkin (Spain) Jaime Fermosell
November 9	Turkey F45 Futures; Antalya, Turkey; Clay $10,000	(Croatia) Mate Delić; 3–6, 6–4, 6–1	(Bosnia and Herzegovina) Tomislav Brkić	(Poland) Maciej Rajski (Spain) Ricardo Ojeda Lara	(Spain) Javier Martí (Belarus) Yaraslav Shyla (Serbia) Goran Marković (Ukraine) Marat Deviatiarov
November 9	Turkey F45 Futures; Antalya, Turkey; Clay $10,000	(Belarus) Yaraslav Shyla (Belarus) Yahor Yatsyk; 6–3, 6–4	(Germany) Marvin Netuschil (Germany) Philipp Scholz	(Poland) Maciej Rajski (Spain) Ricardo Ojeda Lara	(Spain) Javier Martí (Belarus) Yaraslav Shyla (Serbia) Goran Marković (Ukraine) Marat Deviatiarov
November 9	USA F32 Futures; Niceville, United States; Clay $10,000	(Austria) Bastian Trinker; 6–1, 6–2	(United States) Alex Rybakov	(United States) Jean-Yves Aubone (United States) Andrew Carter	(Mexico) Tigre Hank (India) Rishab Agarwal (United States) Alex Rybakov (United States) Justin Shane
November 9	USA F32 Futures; Niceville, United States; Clay $10,000	(Bulgaria) Boris Nicola Bakalov (United States) Brian Battistone; 7–6^{(7–5)}, 5–7, [10–6]	(United States) Nick Chappell (United States) Dane Webb	(United States) Jean-Yves Aubone (United States) Andrew Carter	(Mexico) Tigre Hank (India) Rishab Agarwal (United States) Alex Rybakov (United States) Justin Shane
November 16	Australia F11 Futures; Wollongong, Australia; Hard $15,000	(Australia) Dayne Kelly; 7–6^{(7–1)}, 6–3	(Australia) Maverick Banes	(Australia) Marc Polmans (Czech Republic) Robin Staněk	(Australia) Daniel Nolan (Australia) Jacob Grills (Australia) Zach Itzstein (Germany) Sebastian Fanselow
November 16	Australia F11 Futures; Wollongong, Australia; Hard $15,000	(Australia) Steven de Waard (Australia) Marc Polmans; 6–2, 4–6, [10–7]	(Australia) Ashley Fisher (Australia) Dayne Kelly	(Australia) Marc Polmans (Czech Republic) Robin Staněk	(Australia) Daniel Nolan (Australia) Jacob Grills (Australia) Zach Itzstein (Germany) Sebastian Fanselow
November 16	Brazil F9 Futures; São Paulo, Brazil; Clay $10,000	(Brazil) José Pereira; 6–3, 6–1	(Brazil) Ricardo Hocevar	(Brazil) Pedro Sakamoto (Brazil) Carlos Eduardo Severino	(Brazil) Igor Marcondes (Brazil) João Menezes (Brazil) Eduardo Dischinger (Brazil) Fernando Romboli
November 16	Brazil F9 Futures; São Paulo, Brazil; Clay $10,000	(Brazil) Igor Marcondes (Brazil) João Walendowsky; 4–6, 7–6^{(7–4)}, [10–6]	(Brazil) Pedro Bernardi (Brazil) Pedro Sakamoto	(Brazil) Pedro Sakamoto (Brazil) Carlos Eduardo Severino	(Brazil) Igor Marcondes (Brazil) João Menezes (Brazil) Eduardo Dischinger (Brazil) Fernando Romboli
November 16	Cyprus F1 Futures; Nicosia, Cyprus; Hard $10,000	(Greece) Stefanos Tsitsipas; 2–6, 6–4, 6–2	(Belgium) Alexandre Folie	(Slovakia) Adrian Sikora (Cyprus) Petros Chrysochos	(Austria) Sebastian Ofner (France) Enzo Couacaud (Serbia) Stefan Milićević (Austria) David Pichler
November 16	Cyprus F1 Futures; Nicosia, Cyprus; Hard $10,000	(Cyprus) Petros Chrysochos (Croatia) Nino Serdarušić; 6–3, 3–6, [11–9]	(Belgium) Alexandre Folie (Slovakia) Adrian Sikora	(Slovakia) Adrian Sikora (Cyprus) Petros Chrysochos	(Austria) Sebastian Ofner (France) Enzo Couacaud (Serbia) Stefan Milićević (Austria) David Pichler
November 16	Egypt F40 Futures; Sharm El Sheikh, Egypt; Hard $10,000	(Ukraine) Denys Molchanov; 4–6, 6–4, 6–2	(Bosnia and Herzegovina) Aldin Šetkić	(Switzerland) Siméon Rossier (Ukraine) Vladyslav Manafov	(Argentina) Santiago Rodríguez Taverna (Czech Republic) Libor Salaba (Czech Republic) Václav Šafránek (Czech Republic) Vít Kopřiva
November 16	Egypt F40 Futures; Sharm El Sheikh, Egypt; Hard $10,000	(Czech Republic) Marek Jaloviec (Czech Republic) Václav Šafránek; 6–4, 3–6, [10–6]	(Ukraine) Vladyslav Manafov (Czech Republic) Libor Salaba	(Switzerland) Siméon Rossier (Ukraine) Vladyslav Manafov	(Argentina) Santiago Rodríguez Taverna (Czech Republic) Libor Salaba (Czech Republic) Václav Šafránek (Czech Republic) Vít Kopřiva
November 16	El Salvador F2 Futures; La Libertad, El Salvador; Hard $10,000	(Barbados) Darian King; 7–6^{(8–6)}, 6–4	(El Salvador) Marcelo Arévalo	(United States) Adam El Mihdawy (Guatemala) Christopher Díaz Figueroa	(Bolivia) Federico Zeballos (Guatemala) Wilfredo González (Argentina) Franco Emanuel Egea (Ecuador) Emilio Gómez
November 16	El Salvador F2 Futures; La Libertad, El Salvador; Hard $10,000	(Ecuador) Emilio Gómez (Barbados) Darian King; 6–3, 7–6^{(12–10)}	(El Salvador) Marcelo Arévalo (Guatemala) Christopher Díaz Figueroa	(United States) Adam El Mihdawy (Guatemala) Christopher Díaz Figueroa	(Bolivia) Federico Zeballos (Guatemala) Wilfredo González (Argentina) Franco Emanuel Egea (Ecuador) Emilio Gómez
November 16	India F16 Futures; Gwalior, India; Hard $10,000	(India) Ramkumar Ramanathan; 6–3, 6–4	(India) Prajnesh Gunneswaran	(India) Vishnu Vardhan (India) Mohit Mayur Jayaprakash	(India) Vinayak Sharma Kaza (India) Sidharth Rawat (India) Ranjeet Virali-Murugesan (India) Niki Kaliyanda Poonacha
November 16	India F16 Futures; Gwalior, India; Hard $10,000	(India) Sriram Balaji (India) Vishnu Vardhan; 6–4, 7–6^{(7–5)}	(Chinese Taipei) Hung Jui-chen (India) Ramkumar Ramanathan	(India) Vishnu Vardhan (India) Mohit Mayur Jayaprakash	(India) Vinayak Sharma Kaza (India) Sidharth Rawat (India) Ranjeet Virali-Murugesan (India) Niki Kaliyanda Poonacha
November 16	Kuwait F2 Futures; Mishref, Kuwait; Hard $10,000	(Italy) Alessandro Bega; 6–3, 6–4	(Germany) Peter Heller	(China) Wang Chuhan (Netherlands) Paul Monteban	(Belgium) Jonas Merckx (Spain) Óscar Mesquida Berg (Serbia) Luka Ilić (Spain) Pol Toledo Bagué
November 16	Kuwait F2 Futures; Mishref, Kuwait; Hard $10,000	(Germany) Timon Reichelt (Germany) Leon Schutt; 7–6^{(7–3)}, 6–4	(Japan) Keisuke Numajiri (Japan) Ken Onishi	(China) Wang Chuhan (Netherlands) Paul Monteban	(Belgium) Jonas Merckx (Spain) Óscar Mesquida Berg (Serbia) Luka Ilić (Spain) Pol Toledo Bagué
November 16	Morocco F5 Futures; Casablanca, Morocco; Clay $10,000	(Italy) Stefano Travaglia; 6–4, 6–3	(Portugal) André Gaspar Murta	(Egypt) Karim Hossam (Spain) Marcos Giraldi Requena	(France) Maxime Chazal (Spain) Carlos Boluda-Purkiss (Morocco) Amine Ahouda (Portugal) Nuno Deus
November 16	Morocco F5 Futures; Casablanca, Morocco; Clay $10,000	(Portugal) Nuno Deus (Portugal) André Gaspar Murta; 6–4, 6–2	(Portugal) Gonçalo Falcao (Egypt) Karim Hossam	(Egypt) Karim Hossam (Spain) Marcos Giraldi Requena	(France) Maxime Chazal (Spain) Carlos Boluda-Purkiss (Morocco) Amine Ahouda (Portugal) Nuno Deus
November 16	Peru F4 Futures; Lima, Peru; Clay $10,000	(Argentina) Juan Pablo Paz; 6–2, 4–1, ret.	(Ecuador) Iván Endara	(Chile) Bastián Malla (Chile) Guillermo Rivera Aránguiz	(Peru) Rodrigo Sánchez (Argentina) Sebastián Exequiel Pini (Argentina) Mariano Kestelboim (Canada) Félix Auger-Aliassime
November 16	Peru F4 Futures; Lima, Peru; Clay $10,000	(Ecuador) Iván Endara (Peru) Jorge Brian Panta; 6–3, 7–6^{(7–5)}	(Chile) Guillermo Rivera Aránguiz (Chile) Cristóbal Saavedra Corvalán	(Chile) Bastián Malla (Chile) Guillermo Rivera Aránguiz	(Peru) Rodrigo Sánchez (Argentina) Sebastián Exequiel Pini (Argentina) Mariano Kestelboim (Canada) Félix Auger-Aliassime
November 16	South Africa F3 Futures; Stellenbosch, South Africa; Hard $10,000	(South Africa) Lloyd Harris; 6–2, 6–1	(Austria) Lucas Miedler	(Austria) Pascal Brunner (Monaco) Lucas Catarina	(Italy) Luca Pancaldi (Spain) Javier Pulgar-García (Austria) Peter Goldsteiner (South Africa) Nicolaas Scholtz
November 16	South Africa F3 Futures; Stellenbosch, South Africa; Hard $10,000	(Austria) Pascal Brunner (Austria) Lucas Miedler; 6–4, 7–5	(Austria) Peter Goldsteiner (Réunion) Quentin Robert	(Austria) Pascal Brunner (Monaco) Lucas Catarina	(Italy) Luca Pancaldi (Spain) Javier Pulgar-García (Austria) Peter Goldsteiner (South Africa) Nicolaas Scholtz
November 16	Tunisia F32 Futures; Port El Kantaoui, Tunisia; Hard $10,000	(Serbia) Nikola Milojević; 6–2, 6–3	(France) Alexandre Müller	(Spain) Samuel Ribeiro Navarrete (Netherlands) Tallon Griekspoor	(Germany) Andreas Mies (France) Antoine Escoffier (Spain) David Vega Hernández (Russia) Ivan Nedelko
November 16	Tunisia F32 Futures; Port El Kantaoui, Tunisia; Hard $10,000	(Venezuela) Jordi Muñoz Abreu (Spain) David Pérez Sanz; 6–4, 7–5	(Spain) Samuel Ribeiro Navarrete (Spain) David Vega Hernández	(Spain) Samuel Ribeiro Navarrete (Netherlands) Tallon Griekspoor	(Germany) Andreas Mies (France) Antoine Escoffier (Spain) David Vega Hernández (Russia) Ivan Nedelko
November 16	Turkey F46 Futures; Antalya, Turkey; Clay $10,000	(Spain) Javier Martí; 6–4, 6–4	(Russia) Ivan Gakhov	(Italy) Federico Maccari (Spain) Carlos Taberner	(Croatia) Mate Delić (Russia) Markos Kalovelonis (Spain) Ricardo Ojeda Lara (Bosnia and Herzegovina) Tomislav Brkić
November 16	Turkey F46 Futures; Antalya, Turkey; Clay $10,000	(Sweden) Markus Eriksson (Russia) Ivan Gakhov; 6–4, 7–6^{(7–3)}	(Italy) Daniele Capecchi (Italy) Federico Maccari	(Italy) Federico Maccari (Spain) Carlos Taberner	(Croatia) Mate Delić (Russia) Markos Kalovelonis (Spain) Ricardo Ojeda Lara (Bosnia and Herzegovina) Tomislav Brkić
November 16	USA F33 Futures; Pensacola, United States; Clay $10,000	(United States) Henrik Wiersholm; 6–2, 1–6, 6–3	(United States) Alex Rybakov	(Canada) Denis Shapovalov (Argentina) Maximiliano Estévez	(United States) Denis Nguyen (United States) Evan King (United States) Wil Spencer (United States) Nick Chappell
November 16	USA F33 Futures; Pensacola, United States; Clay $10,000	(Canada) Denis Shapovalov (Hungary) Péter Nagy; 6–3, 6–2	(United States) Christopher Ephron (Brazil) Bruno Savi	(Canada) Denis Shapovalov (Argentina) Maximiliano Estévez	(United States) Denis Nguyen (United States) Evan King (United States) Wil Spencer (United States) Nick Chappell
November 23	Czech Republic F7 Futures; Jablonec nad Nisou, Czech Republic; Carpet $15,000	(Czech Republic) Jan Mertl; 6–2, 6–4	(Croatia) Filip Veger	(Czech Republic) Matěj Vocel (Netherlands) Niels Lootsma	(Slovenia) Tom Kočevar-Dešman (Belgium) Niels Desein (Czech Republic) Jan Hernych (Germany) Mats Moraing
November 23	Czech Republic F7 Futures; Jablonec nad Nisou, Czech Republic; Carpet $15,000	(Netherlands) Sander Arends (Poland) Adam Majchrowicz; 6–3, 6–4	(Belgium) Niels Desein (Czech Republic) Libor Salaba	(Czech Republic) Matěj Vocel (Netherlands) Niels Lootsma	(Slovenia) Tom Kočevar-Dešman (Belgium) Niels Desein (Czech Republic) Jan Hernych (Germany) Mats Moraing
November 23	Thailand F8 Futures; Bangkok, Thailand; Hard $15,000	(South Korea) Lee Duck-hee; 6–1, 6–4	(Latvia) Miķelis Lībietis	(Thailand) Puriwat Chatpatcharoen (South Korea) Kim Young-seok	(United States) Connor Smith (India) Sumit Nagal (Hungary) Mátyás Füle (Australia) Blake Mott
November 23	Thailand F8 Futures; Bangkok, Thailand; Hard $15,000	(Australia) Jarryd Chaplin (Latvia) Miķelis Lībietis; 6–2, 7–6^{(7–4)}	(Thailand) Pruchya Isaro (Thailand) Nuttanon Kadchapanan	(Thailand) Puriwat Chatpatcharoen (South Korea) Kim Young-seok	(United States) Connor Smith (India) Sumit Nagal (Hungary) Mátyás Füle (Australia) Blake Mott
November 23	USA F34 Futures; Waco, USA; Hard $15,000	(Switzerland) Henri Laaksonen; 6–3, 4–6, 6–1	(United States) Sekou Bangoura	(United States) Dennis Nevolo (United States) Nicolas Meister	(United Kingdom) Cameron Norrie (Germany) Jakob Sude (Argentina) Maximiliano Estévez (Chile) Guillermo Núñez
November 23	USA F34 Futures; Waco, USA; Hard $15,000	(United States) Sekou Bangoura (United States) Matt Seeberger; 1–6, 6–3, [10–6]	(Germany) Julian Lenz (United States) William Little	(United States) Dennis Nevolo (United States) Nicolas Meister	(United Kingdom) Cameron Norrie (Germany) Jakob Sude (Argentina) Maximiliano Estévez (Chile) Guillermo Núñez
November 23	Cambodia F1 Futures; Phnom Penh, Cambodia; Hard $10,000	(South Korea) Kwon Soon-woo; 7–5, 6–1	(South Korea) Son Ji-hoon	(Netherlands) Miliaan Niesten (South Korea) Kim Cheong-eui	(Chinese Taipei) Huang Liang-chi (United Kingdom) Richard Gabb (Chinese Taipei) Yu Cheng-yu (Malaysia) Ahmed Deedat Abdul Razak
November 23	Cambodia F1 Futures; Phnom Penh, Cambodia; Hard $10,000	(Chinese Taipei) Lee Kuan-yi (Chinese Taipei) Liu Shao-fan; 6–7^{(6–8)}, 6–4, 13–11	(South Korea) Kwon Soon-woo (South Korea) Son Ji-hoon	(Netherlands) Miliaan Niesten (South Korea) Kim Cheong-eui	(Chinese Taipei) Huang Liang-chi (United Kingdom) Richard Gabb (Chinese Taipei) Yu Cheng-yu (Malaysia) Ahmed Deedat Abdul Razak
November 23	Cyprus F2 Futures; Limassol, Cyprus; Hard $10,000	(Serbia) Miki Janković; 6–1, 6–2	(France) Enzo Couacaud	(Canada) Steven Diez (Slovakia) Adrian Sikora	(Russia) Alexey Vatutin (France) Rayane Roumane (Monaco) Romain Arneodo (Cyprus) Petros Chrysochos
November 23	Cyprus F2 Futures; Limassol, Cyprus; Hard $10,000	(Cyprus) Petros Chrysochos (Croatia) Nino Serdarušić; 1–6, 6–4, 10–3	(Spain) Andrés Artuñedo (Canada) Steven Diez	(Canada) Steven Diez (Slovakia) Adrian Sikora	(Russia) Alexey Vatutin (France) Rayane Roumane (Monaco) Romain Arneodo (Cyprus) Petros Chrysochos
November 23	Egypt F41 Futures; Sharm El Sheikh, Egypt; Hard $10,000	(Bosnia and Herzegovina) Aldin Šetkić; 6–2, 6–3	(Ukraine) Denys Molchanov	(Ukraine) Vladyslav Manafov (Poland) Jan Zieliński	(Poland) Karol Drzewiecki (Czech Republic) Marek Jaloviec (Georgia (country)) George Tsivadze (Poland) Maciej Smoła
November 23	Egypt F41 Futures; Sharm El Sheikh, Egypt; Hard $10,000	(Ukraine) Vladyslav Manafov (Georgia (country)) George Tsivadze; 6–2, 6–3	(Poland) Karol Drzewiecki (Poland) Maciej Smoła	(Ukraine) Vladyslav Manafov (Poland) Jan Zieliński	(Poland) Karol Drzewiecki (Czech Republic) Marek Jaloviec (Georgia (country)) George Tsivadze (Poland) Maciej Smoła
November 23	Guatemala F2 Futures; Guatemala City, Guatemala; Hard $10,000	(El Salvador) Marcelo Arévalo; 6–2, 5–7, 6–3	(Colombia) Juan Sebastián Gómez	(Ecuador) Emilio Gómez (Colombia) José Daniel Bendeck	(Zimbabwe) Benjamin Lock (Bolivia) Federico Zeballos (United States) Adam El Mihdawy (Argentina) Franco Emanuel Egea
November 23	Guatemala F2 Futures; Guatemala City, Guatemala; Hard $10,000	(El Salvador) Marcelo Arévalo (Guatemala) Christopher Díaz Figueroa; 7–5, 6–2	(Guatemala) Wilfredo González (Poland) Piotr Łomacki	(Ecuador) Emilio Gómez (Colombia) José Daniel Bendeck	(Zimbabwe) Benjamin Lock (Bolivia) Federico Zeballos (United States) Adam El Mihdawy (Argentina) Franco Emanuel Egea
November 23	India F17 Futures; Raipur, India; Hard $10,000	(Chinese Taipei) Hung Jui-chen; 4–6, 6–4, 6–3	(India) Haadin Bava	(India) Mohit Mayur Jayaprakash (India) Ronit Singh Bisht	(India) Suraj Prabodh (India) Kunal Anand (India) Prajnesh Gunneswaran (India) Sidharth Rawat
November 23	India F17 Futures; Raipur, India; Hard $10,000	(India) Mohit Mayur Jayaprakash (India) Vinayak Sharma Kaza; 6–4, 6–3	(India) Manish Sureshkumar (India) Vignesh Veerabhadran	(India) Mohit Mayur Jayaprakash (India) Ronit Singh Bisht	(India) Suraj Prabodh (India) Kunal Anand (India) Prajnesh Gunneswaran (India) Sidharth Rawat
November 23	Israel F16 Futures; Tel Aviv, Israel; Hard $10,000	(Republic of Ireland) Sam Barry; 6–3, 6–4	(Israel) Amir Weintraub	(Belgium) Michael Geerts (United States) Eric James Johnson	(Ukraine) Stanislav Poplavskyy (Israel) Mor Bulis (Israel) Dekel Bar (France) Hugo Voljacques
November 23	Israel F16 Futures; Tel Aviv, Israel; Hard $10,000	(Israel) Dekel Bar (Belgium) Michael Geerts; 6–0, 6–2	(France) Jules Okala (France) Hugo Voljacques	(Belgium) Michael Geerts (United States) Eric James Johnson	(Ukraine) Stanislav Poplavskyy (Israel) Mor Bulis (Israel) Dekel Bar (France) Hugo Voljacques
November 23	Kuwait F3 Futures; Mishref, Kuwait; Hard $10,000	(Russia) Evgeny Karlovskiy; 7–6^{(7–3)}, 6–1	(Italy) Lorenzo Frigerio	(Hungary) Gábor Borsos (Germany) Tobias Simon	(Italy) Alessandro Bega (Russia) Alexander Igoshin (Spain) Pol Toledo Bagué (Japan) Ken Onishi
November 23	Kuwait F3 Futures; Mishref, Kuwait; Hard $10,000	(Russia) Alexander Igoshin (Russia) Evgeny Karlovskiy; 6–1, 6–7^{(6–8)}, [10–5]	(Spain) Sergio Martos Gornés (Spain) Pol Toledo Bagué	(Hungary) Gábor Borsos (Germany) Tobias Simon	(Italy) Alessandro Bega (Russia) Alexander Igoshin (Spain) Pol Toledo Bagué (Japan) Ken Onishi
November 23	Morocco F6 Futures; Rabat, Morocco; Hard $10,000	(Spain) Marcos Giraldi Requena; 6–2, 6–3	(Morocco) Amine Ahouda	(Spain) Gerard Granollers (Spain) Carlos Boluda-Purkiss	(Portugal) André Gaspar Murta (Spain) Eduard Esteve Lobato (Portugal) Vasco Mensurado (Egypt) Karim Hossam
November 23	Morocco F6 Futures; Rabat, Morocco; Hard $10,000	(Spain) Eduard Esteve Lobato (Spain) Gerard Granollers; 6–4, 6–4	(Egypt) Karim Hossam (Italy) Tommaso Lago	(Spain) Gerard Granollers (Spain) Carlos Boluda-Purkiss	(Portugal) André Gaspar Murta (Spain) Eduard Esteve Lobato (Portugal) Vasco Mensurado (Egypt) Karim Hossam
November 23	Peru F5 Futures; Lima, Peru; Clay $10,000	(Chile) Bastián Malla; 6–4, 2–6, 6–3	(Argentina) Andrea Collarini	(Austria) Michael Linzer (Peru) Duilio Beretta	(Argentina) Mariano Kestelboim (Argentina) Juan Pablo Paz (Chile) Guillermo Rivera Aránguiz (Canada) Félix Auger-Aliassime
November 23	Peru F5 Futures; Lima, Peru; Clay $10,000	(Ecuador) Iván Endara (Peru) Jorge Brian Panta; Walkover	(Argentina) Andrea Collarini (Argentina) Juan Ignacio Galarza	(Austria) Michael Linzer (Peru) Duilio Beretta	(Argentina) Mariano Kestelboim (Argentina) Juan Pablo Paz (Chile) Guillermo Rivera Aránguiz (Canada) Félix Auger-Aliassime
November 23	Tunisia F33 Futures; Port El Kantaoui, Tunisia; Hard $10,000	(United Kingdom) Evan Hoyt; 3–6, 6–3, 6–3	(Spain) David Pérez Sanz	(Netherlands) Tallon Griekspoor (Russia) Ivan Nedelko	(Tunisia) Anis Ghorbel (Spain) David Vega Hernández (Bulgaria) Vasko Mladenov (Ukraine) Dmytro Badanov
November 23	Tunisia F33 Futures; Port El Kantaoui, Tunisia; Hard $10,000	(Venezuela) Jordi Muñoz Abreu (Spain) David Pérez Sanz; 6–3, 6–1	(Tunisia) Anis Ghorbel (Bulgaria) Vasko Mladenov	(Netherlands) Tallon Griekspoor (Russia) Ivan Nedelko	(Tunisia) Anis Ghorbel (Spain) David Vega Hernández (Bulgaria) Vasko Mladenov (Ukraine) Dmytro Badanov
November 23	Turkey F47 Futures; Antalya, Turkey; Hard $10,000	(Germany) George von Massow; 6–4, 6–3	(Italy) Francesco Picco	(Poland) Maciej Rajski (Germany) Nico Matic	(Spain) Javier Martí (Spain) Miguel Semmler (Spain) Carlos Taberner (Bosnia and Herzegovina) Tomislav Brkić
November 23	Turkey F47 Futures; Antalya, Turkey; Hard $10,000	(Spain) Carlos Taberner (Japan) Kento Yamada; 6–2, 6–2	(Netherlands) Romano Frantzen (Netherlands) Alban Meuffels	(Poland) Maciej Rajski (Germany) Nico Matic	(Spain) Javier Martí (Spain) Miguel Semmler (Spain) Carlos Taberner (Bosnia and Herzegovina) Tomislav Brkić
November 30	Czech Republic F8 Futures; Opava, Czech Republic; Carpet $15,000	(Ukraine) Artem Smirnov; 6–2, 6–2	(Czech Republic) Michal Konečný	(Ukraine) Danylo Kalenichenko (Czech Republic) Václav Šafránek	(Czech Republic) Tomáš Papík (Slovakia) Patrik Fabian (Czech Republic) Libor Salaba (Germany) Mats Moraing
November 30	Czech Republic F8 Futures; Opava, Czech Republic; Carpet $15,000	(Czech Republic) Filip Doležel (Czech Republic) Petr Michnev; 6–1, 6–4	(Czech Republic) Patrik Rikl (Czech Republic) Matěj Vocel	(Ukraine) Danylo Kalenichenko (Czech Republic) Václav Šafránek	(Czech Republic) Tomáš Papík (Slovakia) Patrik Fabian (Czech Republic) Libor Salaba (Germany) Mats Moraing
November 30	Dominican Republic F1 Futures; Santiago de los Caballeros, Dominican Republic; Clay $15,000	(Austria) Bastian Trinker; 6–3, 7–6^{(7–3)}	(Germany) Peter Torebko	(Mexico) Lucas Gómez (Slovakia) Filip Horanský	(Dominican Republic) Nick Hardt (United States) Hunter Reese (Denmark) Benjamin Hannestad (Argentina) Facundo Mena
November 30	Dominican Republic F1 Futures; Santiago de los Caballeros, Dominican Republic; Clay $15,000	(United States) Max Schnur (United States) Raleigh Smith; 7–6^{(9–7)}, 6–2	(Portugal) Gonçalo Oliveira (Germany) Peter Torebko	(Mexico) Lucas Gómez (Slovakia) Filip Horanský	(Dominican Republic) Nick Hardt (United States) Hunter Reese (Denmark) Benjamin Hannestad (Argentina) Facundo Mena
November 30	Thailand F9 Futures; Bangkok, Thailand; Hard $15,000	(United States) Connor Smith; 6–4, 3–6, 6–4	(Japan) Kento Takeuchi	(India) Sumit Nagal (Thailand) Phassawit Burapharitta	(Latvia) Miķelis Lībietis (China) Gao Xin (Thailand) Jirat Navasirisomboon (Thailand) Kittipong Wachiramanowong
November 30	Thailand F9 Futures; Bangkok, Thailand; Hard $15,000	(Thailand) Pruchya Isaro (Thailand) Nuttanon Kadchapanan; 6–3, 7–6^{(7–4)}	(Chinese Taipei) Chen Ti (United States) Connor Smith	(India) Sumit Nagal (Thailand) Phassawit Burapharitta	(Latvia) Miķelis Lībietis (China) Gao Xin (Thailand) Jirat Navasirisomboon (Thailand) Kittipong Wachiramanowong
November 30	USA F35 Futures; Tallahassee, USA; Hard $15,000	(United States) Daniel Nguyen; 3–6, 6–3, 6–3	(United States) Ryan Shane	(Czech Republic) Marek Michalička (United States) Eric Quigley	(Netherlands) Tim van Rijthoven (United States) Sekou Bangoura (United States) Adam El Mihdawy (United States) Gonzales Austin
November 30	USA F35 Futures; Tallahassee, USA; Hard $15,000	(United States) Nicolas Meister (United States) Eric Quigley; 6–3, 7–5	(Mexico) Daniel Garza (Mexico) Tigre Hank	(Czech Republic) Marek Michalička (United States) Eric Quigley	(Netherlands) Tim van Rijthoven (United States) Sekou Bangoura (United States) Adam El Mihdawy (United States) Gonzales Austin
November 30	Cambodia F2 Futures; Phnom Penh, Cambodia; Hard $10,000	(South Korea) Kwon Soon-woo; 6–3, 6–3	(Chinese Taipei) Huang Liang-chi	(South Korea) Kim Cheong-eui (Vietnam) Lý Hoàng Nam	(France) Yannick Jankovits (United Kingdom) Richard Gabb (South Korea) Dylan Seong-kwan Kim (Germany) Matthias Wunner
November 30	Cambodia F2 Futures; Phnom Penh, Cambodia; Hard $10,000	(South Korea) Nam Hyun-woo (South Korea) Seol Jae-min; 7–5, 7–6^{(7–4)}	(United Kingdom) Richard Gabb (Netherlands) Miliaan Niesten	(South Korea) Kim Cheong-eui (Vietnam) Lý Hoàng Nam	(France) Yannick Jankovits (United Kingdom) Richard Gabb (South Korea) Dylan Seong-kwan Kim (Germany) Matthias Wunner
November 30	Chile F8 Futures; Temuco, Chile; Clay $10,000	(Argentina) Hernán Casanova; 6–1, 1–6, 6–0	(Argentina) Patricio Heras	(Chile) Gonzalo Lama (Argentina) Franco Agamenone	(Argentina) Brian Orradre (Chile) Marcelo Tomás Barrios Vera (Argentina) Eduardo Agustín Torre (Argentina) Tomás Lipovšek Puches
November 30	Chile F8 Futures; Temuco, Chile; Clay $10,000	(Argentina) Franco Agamenone (Argentina) Patricio Heras; 2–6, 7–6^{(7–5)}	(Chile) Marcelo Tomás Barrios Vera (Chile) Jorge Montero	(Chile) Gonzalo Lama (Argentina) Franco Agamenone	(Argentina) Brian Orradre (Chile) Marcelo Tomás Barrios Vera (Argentina) Eduardo Agustín Torre (Argentina) Tomás Lipovšek Puches
November 30	Cyprus F3 Futures; Larnaca, Cyprus; Hard $10,000	(Russia) Alexey Vatutin; 6–2, 5–7, 6–3	(Serbia) Miki Janković	(Canada) Steven Diez (Spain) Andrés Artuñedo	(Croatia) Mateo Faber (Ukraine) Yuriy Kryvoy (Cyprus) Petros Chrysochos (Russia) Markos Kalovelonis
November 30	Cyprus F3 Futures; Larnaca, Cyprus; Hard $10,000	(Greece) Konstantinos Economidis (Russia) Markos Kalovelonis; 4–6, 6–3, [10–5]	(Spain) Andrés Artuñedo (Canada) Steven Diez	(Canada) Steven Diez (Spain) Andrés Artuñedo	(Croatia) Mateo Faber (Ukraine) Yuriy Kryvoy (Cyprus) Petros Chrysochos (Russia) Markos Kalovelonis
November 30	Egypt F42 Futures; Sharm El Sheikh, Egypt; Hard $10,000	(Ukraine) Denys Molchanov; 6–1, 6–2	(Poland) Mikołaj Jędruszczak	(Serbia) Darko Jandrić (France) Valentin Nourrissat	(Germany) Christoph Negritu (Poland) Szymon Walków (France) Mikaël Riondy (Poland) Kamil Gajewski
November 30	Egypt F42 Futures; Sharm El Sheikh, Egypt; Hard $10,000	(Poland) Karol Drzewiecki (Poland) Maciej Smoła; 7–5, 6–1	(Poland) Kamil Gajewski (Poland) Mikołaj Jędruszczak	(Serbia) Darko Jandrić (France) Valentin Nourrissat	(Germany) Christoph Negritu (Poland) Szymon Walków (France) Mikaël Riondy (Poland) Kamil Gajewski
November 30	Honduras F1 Futures; San Pedro Sula, Honduras; Hard $10,000	(El Salvador) Marcelo Arévalo; Walkover	(Guatemala) Christopher Díaz Figueroa	(Bolivia) Federico Zeballos (Argentina) Gregorio Cordonnier	(United States) Evan Song (Mexico) Mauricio Astorga (Bolivia) Alejandro Mendoza (Mexico) Alberto Rojas-Maldonado
November 30	Honduras F1 Futures; San Pedro Sula, Honduras; Hard $10,000	(El Salvador) Marcelo Arévalo (Guatemala) Christopher Díaz Figueroa; 6–2, 6–1	(Mexico) Ivar José Aramburu Contreras (United States) Nicholas Reyes	(Bolivia) Federico Zeballos (Argentina) Gregorio Cordonnier	(United States) Evan Song (Mexico) Mauricio Astorga (Bolivia) Alejandro Mendoza (Mexico) Alberto Rojas-Maldonado
November 30	India F18 Futures; Jassowal, India; Hard $10,000	(India) Prajnesh Gunneswaran; 6–4, 6–4	(India) Ronit Singh Bisht	(India) Kunal Anand (India) Chandril Sood	(India) Niki Kaliyanda Poonacha (India) Mohit Mayur Jayaprakash (India) Aryan Goveas (India) Sidharth Rawat
November 30	India F18 Futures; Jassowal, India; Hard $10,000	(India) Anvit Bendre (India) Chandril Sood; 6–4, 6–2	(Chinese Taipei) Hung Jui-chen (Chinese Taipei) Lin Wei-de	(India) Kunal Anand (India) Chandril Sood	(India) Niki Kaliyanda Poonacha (India) Mohit Mayur Jayaprakash (India) Aryan Goveas (India) Sidharth Rawat
November 30	Israel F17 Futures; Tel Aviv, Israel; Hard $10,000	(United States) Peter Kobelt; 2–6, 6–3, 6–4	(Republic of Ireland) Sam Barry	(Israel) Amir Weintraub (Netherlands) Lennert van der Linden	(Ukraine) Stanislav Poplavskyy (United States) John Lamble (Israel) Dekel Bar (Canada) Martin Beran
November 30	Israel F17 Futures; Tel Aviv, Israel; Hard $10,000	(Belgium) Michael Geerts (Belgium) Sander Gillé; 6–2, 6–1	(Israel) Yannai Barkai (Israel) Daniel Dudockin	(Israel) Amir Weintraub (Netherlands) Lennert van der Linden	(Ukraine) Stanislav Poplavskyy (United States) John Lamble (Israel) Dekel Bar (Canada) Martin Beran
November 30	Peru F6 Futures; Trujillo, Peru; Clay $10,000	(Austria) Michael Linzer; 7–5, 2–6, 6–3	(Peru) Duilio Beretta	(Argentina) Andrea Collarini (Ecuador) Iván Endara	(Colombia) Felipe Mantilla (Argentina) Federico Moreno (Argentina) Mariano Kestelboim (Chile) Cristóbal Saavedra
November 30	Peru F6 Futures; Trujillo, Peru; Clay $10,000	(Peru) Duilio Beretta (Argentina) Andrea Collarini; 6–4, 6–3	(Peru) Alexander Merino (Spain) Jaume Pla Malfeito	(Argentina) Andrea Collarini (Ecuador) Iván Endara	(Colombia) Felipe Mantilla (Argentina) Federico Moreno (Argentina) Mariano Kestelboim (Chile) Cristóbal Saavedra
November 30	Qatar F4 Futures; Doha, Qatar; Hard $10,000	(United Kingdom) Luke Bambridge; 6–2, 3–6, 6–1	(Czech Republic) Dominik Kellovský	(Switzerland) Antoine Bellier (Belgium) Joris De Loore	(South Korea) Hong Seong-chan (Switzerland) Adrien Bossel (Slovenia) Tom Kočevar-Dešman (Japan) Kaichi Uchida
November 30	Qatar F4 Futures; Doha, Qatar; Hard $10,000	(Belgium) Joris De Loore (Belgium) Laurens Verboven; 6–4, 3–6, [10–7]	(United Kingdom) Luke Bambridge (Japan) Kaichi Uchida	(Switzerland) Antoine Bellier (Belgium) Joris De Loore	(South Korea) Hong Seong-chan (Switzerland) Adrien Bossel (Slovenia) Tom Kočevar-Dešman (Japan) Kaichi Uchida
November 30	Tunisia F34 Futures; Port El Kantaoui, Tunisia; Hard $10,000	(United Kingdom) Lloyd Glasspool; 6–3, 6–4	(Spain) Roberto Ortega Olmedo	(Spain) David Pérez Sanz (Serbia) Miljan Zekić	(United Kingdom) Evan Hoyt (Spain) Gerard Granollers (Ukraine) Alexander Lebedyn (Bulgaria) Vasko Mladenov
November 30	Tunisia F34 Futures; Port El Kantaoui, Tunisia; Hard $10,000	(Tunisia) Anis Ghorbel (Bulgaria) Vasko Mladenov; 6–7^{(2–7)}, 6–4, [10–8]	(Spain) David Pérez Sanz (Spain) David Vega Hernández	(Spain) David Pérez Sanz (Serbia) Miljan Zekić	(United Kingdom) Evan Hoyt (Spain) Gerard Granollers (Ukraine) Alexander Lebedyn (Bulgaria) Vasko Mladenov
November 30	Turkey F48 Futures; Antalya, Turkey; Clay $10,000	(Spain) Pere Riba; 6–2, 3–6, 7–6^{(7–3)}	(Bulgaria) Dimitar Kuzmanov	(Portugal) João Domingues (Italy) Riccardo Bellotti	(Poland) Maciej Rajski (Italy) Federico Maccari (Austria) Lenny Hampel (Germany) George von Massow
November 30	Turkey F48 Futures; Antalya, Turkey; Clay $10,000	(Netherlands) Romano Frantzen (Netherlands) Alban Meuffels; 7–5, 2–6, [10–6]	(Portugal) João Domingues (Portugal) Diogo Lourenco	(Portugal) João Domingues (Italy) Riccardo Bellotti	(Poland) Maciej Rajski (Italy) Federico Maccari (Austria) Lenny Hampel (Germany) George von Massow

=== December ===
Week of	Tournament	Winner	Runners-up	Semifinalists	Quarterfinalists
December 7	Dominican Republic F2 Futures; Santo Domingo, Dominican Republic; Clay $15,000	(Uruguay) Martín Cuevas; 7–5, 6–0	(Argentina) Juan Ignacio Galarza	(Slovakia) Filip Horanský (Argentina) Facundo Mena	(Austria) Bastian Trinker (United States) Robert Levine (Germany) Peter Torebko (Colombia) Nicolás Barrientos
December 7	Dominican Republic F2 Futures; Santo Domingo, Dominican Republic; Clay $15,000	(South Africa) Keith-Patrick Crowley (United States) Max Schnur; 4–6, 6–4, [10–5]	(Argentina) Juan Ignacio Galarza (Argentina) Facundo Mena	(Slovakia) Filip Horanský (Argentina) Facundo Mena	(Austria) Bastian Trinker (United States) Robert Levine (Germany) Peter Torebko (Colombia) Nicolás Barrientos
December 7	Nigeria F3 Futures; Lagos, Nigeria; Hard $15,000	(Bosnia and Herzegovina) Aldin Šetkić; 6–2, 6–0	(France) Sadio Doumbia	(South Africa) Lloyd Harris (Zimbabwe) Takanyi Garanganga	(Benin) Alexis Klégou (Nigeria) Christian Paul (Netherlands) Antal van der Duim (Spain) Pere Riba
December 7	Nigeria F3 Futures; Lagos, Nigeria; Hard $15,000	(Netherlands) David Pel (Netherlands) Antal van der Duim; 6–3, 6–2	(South Africa) Lloyd Harris (Egypt) Karim-Mohamed Maamoun	(South Africa) Lloyd Harris (Zimbabwe) Takanyi Garanganga	(Benin) Alexis Klégou (Nigeria) Christian Paul (Netherlands) Antal van der Duim (Spain) Pere Riba
December 7	Cambodia F3 Futures; Phnom Penh, Cambodia; Hard $10,000	(South Korea) Kim Cheong-eui; 6–3, 6–4	(Chinese Taipei) Chen Ti	(Germany) Tom Schönenberg (Japan) Masato Shiga	(Germany) Matthias Wunner (South Korea) Nam Hyun-woo (South Korea) Cho Min-hyeok (France) Yannick Jankovits
December 7	Cambodia F3 Futures; Phnom Penh, Cambodia; Hard $10,000	(South Korea) Cho Min-hyeok (South Korea) Jeong Young-hoon; 6–2, 6–2	(Germany) Tom Schönenberg (Germany) Matthias Wunner	(Germany) Tom Schönenberg (Japan) Masato Shiga	(Germany) Matthias Wunner (South Korea) Nam Hyun-woo (South Korea) Cho Min-hyeok (France) Yannick Jankovits
December 7	Chile F9 Futures; Osorno, Chile; Clay $10,000	(Chile) Gonzalo Lama; 7–5, 6–3	(Argentina) Tomás Lipovšek Puches	(Brazil) João Pedro Sorgi (Argentina) Patricio Heras	(Argentina) Maximiliano Estévez (Argentina) Hernán Casanova (Argentina) Matías Zukas (Argentina) Eduardo Agustín Torre
December 7	Chile F9 Futures; Osorno, Chile; Clay $10,000	(Chile) Marcelo Tomás Barrios Vera (Chile) Jorge Montero; 6–4, 6–1	(Chile) Guillermo Rivera Aránguiz (Chile) Cristóbal Saavedra	(Brazil) João Pedro Sorgi (Argentina) Patricio Heras	(Argentina) Maximiliano Estévez (Argentina) Hernán Casanova (Argentina) Matías Zukas (Argentina) Eduardo Agustín Torre
December 7	Egypt F43 Futures; Sharm El Sheikh, Egypt; Hard $10,000	(Serbia) Marko Tepavac; 6–3, 6–4	(Italy) Alessandro Bega	(Germany) Christoph Negritu (Czech Republic) Marek Jaloviec	(Ukraine) Stanislav Poplavskyy (Ukraine) Vladyslav Manafov (Ukraine) Vladyslav Orlov (Egypt) Karim Hossam
December 7	Egypt F43 Futures; Sharm El Sheikh, Egypt; Hard $10,000	(Ukraine) Filipp Kekercheni (Germany) Christoph Negritu; 6–3, 6–2	(Czech Republic) Marek Jaloviec (Austria) Dominic Weidinger	(Germany) Christoph Negritu (Czech Republic) Marek Jaloviec	(Ukraine) Stanislav Poplavskyy (Ukraine) Vladyslav Manafov (Ukraine) Vladyslav Orlov (Egypt) Karim Hossam
December 7	India F19 Futures; Mumbai, India; Hard $10,000	(India) Ramkumar Ramanathan; 6–3, 6–3	(India) Prajnesh Gunneswaran	(India) Sumit Nagal (India) Mohit Mayur Jayaprakash	(India) Sidharth Rawat (India) Jayesh Pungliya (India) Sriram Balaji (India) Suraj Prabodh
December 7	India F19 Futures; Mumbai, India; Hard $10,000	(India) Niki Kaliyanda Poonacha (India) Ramkumar Ramanathan; 6–4, 6–3	(India) Anvit Bendre (India) Chandril Sood	(India) Sumit Nagal (India) Mohit Mayur Jayaprakash	(India) Sidharth Rawat (India) Jayesh Pungliya (India) Sriram Balaji (India) Suraj Prabodh
December 7	Israel F18 Futures; Tel Aviv, Israel; Hard $10,000	(Israel) Amir Weintraub; 6–3, 6–2	(Israel) Dekel Bar	(Belgium) Sander Gillé (United States) Peter Kobelt	(Israel) Tal Goldengoren (Israel) Bar Tzuf Botzer (Belgium) Julien Dubail (Netherlands) Lennert van der Linden
December 7	Israel F18 Futures; Tel Aviv, Israel; Hard $10,000	(Belgium) Julien Dubail (Belgium) Sander Gillé; 6–3, 4–6, [10–4]	(Romania) George Botezan (Israel) Mor Bulis	(Belgium) Sander Gillé (United States) Peter Kobelt	(Israel) Tal Goldengoren (Israel) Bar Tzuf Botzer (Belgium) Julien Dubail (Netherlands) Lennert van der Linden
December 7	Qatar F5 Futures; Doha, Qatar; Hard $10,000	(Belgium) Joris De Loore; 6–3, 6–2	(South Korea) Hong Seong-chan	(United Kingdom) Luke Bambridge (Japan) Hiroyasu Ehara	(United Kingdom) Jonny O'Mara (Sweden) Jonathan Mridha (Switzerland) Antoine Bellier (Italy) Pietro Licciardi
December 7	Qatar F5 Futures; Doha, Qatar; Hard $10,000	(Belgium) Joris De Loore (Belgium) Michael Geerts; 7–5, 6–3	(United Kingdom) Luke Bambridge (Germany) Mats Moraing	(United Kingdom) Luke Bambridge (Japan) Hiroyasu Ehara	(United Kingdom) Jonny O'Mara (Sweden) Jonathan Mridha (Switzerland) Antoine Bellier (Italy) Pietro Licciardi
December 7	Tunisia F35 Futures; Port El Kantaoui, Tunisia; Hard $10,000	(Serbia) Nikola Milojević; 6–3, 7–5	(Tunisia) Anis Ghorbel	(Ukraine) Dmytro Badanov (United Kingdom) Lloyd Glasspool	(Morocco) Amine Ahouda (France) Romain Bauvy (Spain) Roberto Ortega Olmedo (United Kingdom) Neil Pauffley
December 7	Tunisia F35 Futures; Port El Kantaoui, Tunisia; Hard $10,000	(Republic of Ireland) Peter Bothwell (United Kingdom) Lloyd Glasspool; 6–1, 6–4	(Tunisia) Anis Ghorbel (Bulgaria) Vasko Mladenov	(Ukraine) Dmytro Badanov (United Kingdom) Lloyd Glasspool	(Morocco) Amine Ahouda (France) Romain Bauvy (Spain) Roberto Ortega Olmedo (United Kingdom) Neil Pauffley
December 7	Turkey F49 Futures; Antalya, Turkey; Hard $10,000	(Czech Republic) Michal Konečný; 6–0, 6–1	(Turkey) Cem İlkel	(Russia) Roman Safiullin (Kazakhstan) Dmitry Popko	(Italy) Riccardo Bellotti (Iran) Shahin Khaledan (Austria) Sebastian Ofner (Italy) Lorenzo Frigerio
December 7	Turkey F49 Futures; Antalya, Turkey; Hard $10,000	(Italy) Lorenzo Frigerio (Italy) Francesco Vilardo; 3–6, 6–2, [10–4]	(Austria) Lenny Hampel (Austria) David Pichler	(Russia) Roman Safiullin (Kazakhstan) Dmitry Popko	(Italy) Riccardo Bellotti (Iran) Shahin Khaledan (Austria) Sebastian Ofner (Italy) Lorenzo Frigerio
December 14	Dominican Republic F3 Futures; Santo Domingo Este, Dominican Republic; Hard $15,000	(United States) Sekou Bangoura; 6–7^{(6–8)}, 6–3, 6–2	(Argentina) Facundo Mena	(Germany) Peter Torebko (Spain) Jaume Pla Malfeito	(United States) Alexios Halebian (Mexico) Lucas Gómez (The Bahamas) Justin Roberts (United States) Hunter Reese
December 14	Dominican Republic F3 Futures; Santo Domingo Este, Dominican Republic; Hard $15,000	(South Africa) Keith-Patrick Crowley (United States) Max Schnur; 7–6^{(7–3)}, 6–2	(Argentina) Mateo Nicolás Martínez (Mexico) Luis Patiño	(Germany) Peter Torebko (Spain) Jaume Pla Malfeito	(United States) Alexios Halebian (Mexico) Lucas Gómez (The Bahamas) Justin Roberts (United States) Hunter Reese
December 14	Nigeria F4 Futures; Lagos, Nigeria; Hard $15,000	(Netherlands) Antal van der Duim; 6–3, 7–6^{(7–0)}	(Zimbabwe) Takanyi Garanganga	(Bosnia and Herzegovina) Aldin Šetkić (South Africa) Lloyd Harris	(Egypt) Karim-Mohamed Maamoun (Uganda) Duncan Mugabe (France) Sadio Doumbia (France) Fabien Reboul
December 14	Nigeria F4 Futures; Lagos, Nigeria; Hard $15,000	(South Africa) Lloyd Harris (Egypt) Karim-Mohamed Maamoun; 7–5, 7–6^{(7–5)}	(Netherlands) David Pel (Netherlands) Antal van der Duim	(Bosnia and Herzegovina) Aldin Šetkić (South Africa) Lloyd Harris	(Egypt) Karim-Mohamed Maamoun (Uganda) Duncan Mugabe (France) Sadio Doumbia (France) Fabien Reboul
December 14	Chile F10 Futures; Puerto Montt, Chile; Hard $10,000	(Argentina) Maximiliano Estévez; 6–4, 6–2	(Argentina) Matías Zukas	(Chile) Marcelo Tomás Barrios Vera (Argentina) Hernán Casanova	(Argentina) Tomás Lipovšek Puches (Argentina) Nicolás Alejandro de Gregorio (Argentina) Brian Orradre (Brazil) Eduardo Dischinger
December 14	Chile F10 Futures; Puerto Montt, Chile; Hard $10,000	(Argentina) Franco Agamenone (Argentina) Tomás Lipovšek Puches; 6–3, 3–6, [10–3]	(Chile) Marcelo Tomás Barrios Vera (Chile) Jorge Montero	(Chile) Marcelo Tomás Barrios Vera (Argentina) Hernán Casanova	(Argentina) Tomás Lipovšek Puches (Argentina) Nicolás Alejandro de Gregorio (Argentina) Brian Orradre (Brazil) Eduardo Dischinger
December 14	Qatar F6 Futures; Doha, Qatar; Hard $10,000	(Belgium) Joris De Loore; 6–3, 6–3	(United Kingdom) Luke Bambridge	(United Kingdom) Scott Clayton (Germany) Mats Moraing	(Sweden) Jonathan Mridha (Italy) Pietro Licciardi (Japan) Kaichi Uchida (United Kingdom) Jonny O'Mara
December 14	Qatar F6 Futures; Doha, Qatar; Hard $10,000	(India) Haadin Bava (China) Wang Aoxiong; 6–2, 3–6, [10–3]	(United Kingdom) Luke Bambridge (Germany) Mats Moraing	(United Kingdom) Scott Clayton (Germany) Mats Moraing	(Sweden) Jonathan Mridha (Italy) Pietro Licciardi (Japan) Kaichi Uchida (United Kingdom) Jonny O'Mara
December 14	Tunisia F36 Futures; Port El Kantaoui, Tunisia; Hard $10,000	(Serbia) Nikola Milojević; 6–2, 4–6, 6–3	(Tunisia) Anis Ghorbel	(France) Ronan Joncour (United Kingdom) Neil Pauffley	(Bulgaria) Vasko Mladenov (Ukraine) Denys Mylokostov (Tunisia) Skander Mansouri (United Kingdom) Lloyd Glasspool
December 14	Tunisia F36 Futures; Port El Kantaoui, Tunisia; Hard $10,000	(France) Antoine Hoang (France) Ronan Joncour; 7–6^{(8–6)}, 7–6^{(7–0)}	(Tunisia) Moez Echargui (Tunisia) Skander Mansouri	(France) Ronan Joncour (United Kingdom) Neil Pauffley	(Bulgaria) Vasko Mladenov (Ukraine) Denys Mylokostov (Tunisia) Skander Mansouri (United Kingdom) Lloyd Glasspool
December 14	Turkey F50 Futures; Antalya, Turkey; Hard $10,000	(Belgium) Christopher Heyman; 6–2, 6–4	(Italy) Francesco Vilardo	(Austria) Sebastian Ofner (Austria) David Pichler	(Ukraine) Marat Deviatiarov (Russia) Roman Safiullin (Italy) Adelchi Virgili (Serbia) Marko Tepavac
December 14	Turkey F50 Futures; Antalya, Turkey; Hard $10,000	(Austria) Lenny Hampel (Austria) David Pichler; 6–2, 6–1	(Turkey) Tuna Altuna (Turkey) Cem İlkel	(Austria) Sebastian Ofner (Austria) David Pichler	(Ukraine) Marat Deviatiarov (Russia) Roman Safiullin (Italy) Adelchi Virgili (Serbia) Marko Tepavac
December 21	Turkey F52 Futures; Antalya, Turkey; Hard $10,000	(Belgium) Christopher Heyman; 6–4, 6–4	(Italy) Adelchi Virgili	(France) Geoffrey Blancaneaux (Turkey) Cem İlkel	(Russia) Ivan Nedelko (Ukraine) Marat Deviatiarov (Turkey) Anıl Yüksel (Croatia) Franjo Raspudic
December 21	Turkey F52 Futures; Antalya, Turkey; Hard $10,000	(Turkey) Tuna Altuna (Turkey) Cem İlkel; 4–6, 6–2, [10–6]	(Turkey) Sarp Ağabigün (Turkey) Altuğ Çelikbilek	(France) Geoffrey Blancaneaux (Turkey) Cem İlkel	(Russia) Ivan Nedelko (Ukraine) Marat Deviatiarov (Turkey) Anıl Yüksel (Croatia) Franjo Raspudic
