= 2017 Kobe Challenger – Singles =

Singles
- 2017 Kobe Challenger

Final
- Champion: (France) Stéphane Robert
- Runner-up: (France) Calvin Hemery
- Score: 7–6^{(7–1)}, 6–7^{(5–7)}, 6–1

Events
Singles	Doubles
- Kobe Challenger

Chung Hyeon was the defending champion but chose not to defend his title.

Stéphane Robert won the title after defeating Calvin Hemery 7–6^{(7–1)}, 6–7^{(5–7)}, 6–1 in the final.

== Seeds ==
1. (Moldova) Radu Albot (second round)
2. (Japan) Taro Daniel (first round)
3. (Australia) Matthew Ebden (second round)
4. (Canada) Peter Polansky (second round)
5. (Japan) Tatsuma Ito (second round)
6. (Australia) Akira Santillan (semifinals)
7. (Japan) Go Soeda (quarterfinals)
8. (Australia) John Millman (quarterfinals)

== Draw ==
Key

- Q = Qualifier
- WC = Wild card
- LL = Lucky loser
- Alt = Alternate
- ITF = ITF entry
- PR = Protected ranking
- SR = Special ranking
- SE = Special exempt
- JE = Junior exempt
- JR = Junior Accelerator Programme entrant
- CO = College Accelerator Programme entrant
- NG = Next Gen Accelerator Program entrant
- w/o = Walkover
- r = Retired
- d = Defaulted

=== Finals ===
Semifinals
(South Korea) Kwon Soon-woo	2	5
(France) Calvin Hemery	6	7
(France) Stéphane Robert	7^{7}	6
6	(Australia) Akira Santillan	6^{1}	2

Final
(France) Calvin Hemery	6^{1}	7^{7}	1
(France) Stéphane Robert	7^{7}	6^{5}	6

=== Top half ===
First round
1	(Moldova) R Albot	6	3
(Russia) T Gabashvili	1	0^{r}
(Japan) Y Takahashi	5	2
Q	(Japan) Yo Watanuki	7	6
(Japan) Y Uchiyama	6	3	6^{4}
(South Korea) S-w Kwon	3	6	7^{7}
(South Korea) D-h Lee	2	1
5	(Japan) T Ito	6	6
3	(Australia) M Ebden	4	6	7
(Japan) H Moriya	6	4	5
(France) C Hemery	7^{9}	6
(United States) A Krajicek	6^{7}	2
(South Africa) L Harris	6	3	0
Q	(Japan) Sora Fukuda	4	6	6
WC	(Japan) Yuya Kibi	3	4
8	(Australia) J Millman	6	6

Second round
1	(Moldova) R Albot	7	2	0
Q	(Japan) Yo Watanuki	5	6	6
(South Korea) S-w Kwon	7^{7}	6
5	(Japan) T Ito	6^{4}	3
3	(Australia) M Ebden	4	3
(France) C Hemery	6	6
Q	(Japan) S Fukuda	1	1
8	(Australia) J Millman	6	6

Quarterfinals
Q	(Japan) Yo Watanuki	7	3	5
(South Korea) S-w Kwon	5	6	7
(France) C Hemery	6	6
8	(Australia) J Millman	4	3

Semifinals
(South Korea) S-w Kwon	2	5
(France) C Hemery	6	7

=== Bottom half ===
First round
7	(Japan) G Soeda	6	6
WC	(Japan) Y Shimizu	2	0
(Chinese Taipei) J Jung	2	6	6
(Australia) O Jasika	6	4	4
(France) S Robert	6	6
Q	(Australia) M Matosevic	3	1
WC	(Japan) Ken Onishi	1	4
4	(Canada) P Polansky	6	6
6	(Australia) A Santillan	6	6
WC	(Japan) K Uesugi	1	3
SE	(Poland) H Hurkacz	6	6
Q	(Austria) L Miedler	4	4
(Israel) E Leshem	3	4
(Australia) A Bolt	6	6
(China) Ze Zhang	7	6
2	(Japan) T Daniel	5	1

Second round
7	(Japan) G Soeda	6	6
(Chinese Taipei) J Jung	3	4
(France) S Robert	6	7
4	(Canada) P Polansky	4	5
6	(Australia) A Santillan	6	7^{7}
SE	(Poland) H Hurkacz	3	6^{5}
(Australia) A Bolt	7	2	6
(China) Ze Zhang	5	6	2

Quarterfinals
7	(Japan) G Soeda	5	3
(France) S Robert	7	6
6	(Australia) A Santillan	6	6
(Australia) A Bolt	3	2

Semifinals
(France) S Robert	7^{7}	6
6	(Australia) A Santillan	6^{1}	2
