= Ben Patael =

Israeli tennis player

Ben Patael בן פתאל
- Country (sports): Israel
- Residence: Tel Aviv, Israel
- Born: 2 June 1997 (age 29) Tel Aviv, Israel
- Height: 6 ft 2 in (188 cm)
- Plays: Right-handed (two-handed backhand)
- Prize money: $79,029

Singles
- Career record: 0–2 (at ATP Tour level, Grand Slam level, and in Davis Cup)
- Career titles: 5 ITF
- Highest ranking: No. 380 (22 August 2022)

Doubles
- Career record: 1–0 (at ATP Tour level, Grand Slam level, and in Davis Cup)
- Career titles: 1 ITF
- Highest ranking: No. 1,050 (27 July 2015)

Team competitions
- Davis Cup: 1–2

Ben Patael (Hebrew: בן פתאל; born 2 June 1997) is an Israeli tennis player.

Patael has a career-high ATP singles ranking of No. 380 achieved on 22 August 2022 and a career-high ATP doubles ranking of 1,050 achieved on 27 July 2015.

He has won one ITF Futures singles title and one ITF Futures doubles title.

Patael has represented Israel in the Davis Cup, where he has a win–loss record of 1–2.

== Personal life ==
Patael was born in Rishon Lezion and resides in Netaim, Israel.

== Career ==
In September 2017, Patael won the inaugural Anna and Michael Kahan Family Prize in Ramat Hasharon, defeating Mor Bulis 6–3, 3–6, 6–3 in the boys’ final.

== Challenger and Futures/World Tennis Tour Finals ==
=== Singles: 14 (7-7) ===
Legend (singles) ATP Challenger Tour (0-0) ITF Futures/World Tennis Tour (7-7)	Titles by surface Hard (7-7) Clay (0-0) Grass (0–0) Carpet (0–0)

Result	W–L	Date	Tournament	Tier	Surface	Opponent	Score
Win	1–0	Jul 2016	Portugal F9, Idanha-a-Nova	Futures	Hard	(Portugal) Andre Gaspar Murta	7-6^{(7–2)}, 6–4
Loss	1–1	May 2017	Israel F6, Akko	Futures	Hard	(Israel) Edan Leshem	3-6, 3–6
Win	2–1	Oct 2018	Israel F12, Herzliya	Futures	Hard	(Israel) Igor Smilansky	2-6, 6–3, 6–4
Win	3–1	Oct 2018	Israel F13, Ashkelon	Futures	Hard	(Argentina) Matias Franco Descotte	6-4, 6–2
Win	4–1	May 2021	M15, Ramat Hasharon, Israel	World Tennis Tour	Hard	(Israel) Yshai Oliel	6-4, 6–4
Win	5–1	Jun 2021	M15, Heraklion, Greece	World Tennis Tour	Hard	(Italy) Federico Arnaboldi	6-1, 6–4
Loss	5–2	Jun 2021	M15, Heraklion, Greece	World Tennis Tour	Hard	(Japan) Yuki Mochizuki	5-7, 2–6
Loss	5–3	Feb 2022	M15, Sharm El Sheikh, Egypt	World Tennis Tour	Hard	(South Korea) Lee Duck-hee	2-6, 6–1, 5–7
Loss	5–4	May 2022	M15, Akko, Israel	World Tennis Tour	Hard	(Israel) Daniel Cukierman	5-7, 2–6
Win	6–4	Jun 2022	M15, Raanana, Israel	World Tennis Tour	Hard	(Israel) Orel Kimhi	3-6, 6–3, 6–1
Loss	6–5	Jul 2022	M25, Idanha-a-Nova, Portugal	World Tennis Tour	Hard	(Japan) Rio Noguchi	2-6, 4–6
Loss	6–6	Jul 2022	M25, Idanha-a-Nova, Portugal	World Tennis Tour	Hard	(Japan) Rio Noguchi	2-6, 6-7^{(5–7)}
Loss	6–7	Aug 2022	M15, Kfar Saba, Israel	World Tennis Tour	Hard	(Israel) Sahar Simon	3-6, 6–4, 2–6
Win	7–7	Aug 2022	M15, Herzlia, Israel	World Tennis Tour	Hard	(Japan) Kazuma Kawachi	7-6^{(7–2)}, 2–6, 6–3
