= Edan Leshem =

Israeli tennis player

Edan Leshem עידן לשם
- Full name: Edan Leshem
- Native name: עידן לשם
- Country (sports): Israel
- Residence: Ra'anana, Israel
- Born: March 19, 1997 (age 28) New York City, United States
- Height: 1.83 m (6 ft 0 in)
- Plays: Right-handed (two-handed backhand)
- Coach: Amos Mansdorf
- Prize money: $192,854

Singles
- Career record: 5–13
- Career titles: 0
- Highest ranking: No. 249 (18 December 2017)

Grand Slam singles results
- Australian Open: Q1 (2018)

Doubles
- Career record: 0–1
- Career titles: 0
- Highest ranking: No. 349 (24 September 2018)

Team competitions
- Davis Cup: 5–8

Edan Leshem (Hebrew: עידן לשם; born March 19, 1997) is an Israeli tennis player. In 2015, he began playing for the Israel Davis Cup team at the age of 17.

Leshem has a career-high singles ranking of No. 249 achieved on 18 December 2017 and a career-high doubles ranking is No. 349 achieved on 24 September 2018.

== Personal info ==
Leshem was born in New York City, and resides in Israel.

== Career ==
=== 2014–15: First ITF title ===
In December 2014, Leshem lost in the final of the Israeli national championships in Ra'anana to Dudi Sela, 6–1, 6–2.

In November 2015, Leshem won the Israel F15 in Tel Aviv, Israel.

=== 2016–17: ATP and top 250 debut ===
In June 2016 Leshem won both the Israel F9 in Kiryat Shmona, Israel, and the Israel F10 in Akko, Israel.

In April 2017, Leshem won both the Israel F3 in Tel Aviv, Israel, defeating Matias Franco Descotte in the final, and the Israel F4 in Ramat Gan, Israel, defeating Mats Moraing in the final. In May 2017 he won the Israel F6 in Akko, Israel, defeating Ben Patael in the final.

He made his debut at the 2017 Citi Open in Washington as a qualifier where he lost to Marcos Baghdatis in the first round.

=== 2018–19 ===
He was elected to receive a $25,000 grant through the Grand Slam Development Fund for 2018.

In June 2018, Leshem won the doubles with Daniel Cukierman in the Israel F8 in Tel Aviv, Israel, defeating Dan Added and Albano Olivetti in the finals, and the singles in the Israel F9 in Netanya, Israel, defeating Alessandro Bega in the final.

In September 2019 he won his ninth ITF title, the M25 in Ust-Kamenogorsk, Kazakhstan, defeating Konstantin Kravchuk in the final.

=== 2022: First ATP win, Israeli No. 1 player ===
At the 2022 Tel Aviv Open, his home tournament, he qualified for the main draw having received a wildcard. He defeated seventh seed Lorenzo Giustino and third seed Luca Nardi. He recorded his first ATP career win defeating compatriot, wildcard Yshai Oliel. As a result, he climbed close to 70 positions up the rankings to No. 377 and became the No. 1 Israeli player in singles on 3 October 2022.

== National representation ==
=== Davis Cup ===
He was called up to play for the Israel Davis Cup team at the age of 17 in February 2015, after the retirement of Andy Ram. Leshem played for the team against the Romania Davis Cup team in 2015, losing in singles to world # 159 Adrian Ungur by a score of 6–4, 6–2. In doubles, he and Bar Botzer lost to Florin Mergea (world doubles # 17) and Horia Tecău (world doubles # 9), 6–3, 6–4, 6–4. In 2020 in the G1 Israel vs Turkey Round 1 he defeated Cem Ilkel, ranked # 195 in the world.

== ATP Challenger and Futures/ITF World Tennis Tour finals ==
=== Singles: 20 (9 titles, 11 runner-ups) ===
Legend (singles) ATP Challenger Tour (0–0) Futures/ITF World Tennis Tour (9–11)	Finals by surface Hard (9–11) Clay (0–0) Grass (0–0) Carpet (0–0)

Result	W–L	Date	Tournament	Tier	Surface	Opponent	Score
Win	1–0	May 2015	Israel F6, Akko	Futures	Hard	(United States) Peter Kobelt	6–4, 6–2
Win	2–0	Nov 2015	Israel F15, Tel Aviv	Futures	Hard	(Netherlands) Lennert Van der Linden	6–1, 5–7, 6–3
Loss	2–1	May 2016	Israel F7, Tel Aviv	Futures	Hard	(United States) Nicolas Meister	6–7^{(3–7)}, 5–7
Win	3–1	Jun 2016	Israel F9, Kiryat Shmona	Futures	Hard	(United States) Nick Chappell	6–3, 6–3
Win	4–1	Jun 2016	Israel F10, Akko	Futures	Hard	(United States) Nick Chappell	6–2, 6–1
Loss	4–2	Mar 2017	Israel F1, Ramat HaSharon	Futures	Hard	(France) Enzo Couacaud	4–6, 4–6
Loss	4–3	Mar 2017	Israel F2, Ramat HaSharon	Futures	Hard	(France) Enzo Couacaud	5–7, 1–6
Win	5–3	Apr 2017	Israel F3, Tel Aviv	Futures	Hard	(Argentina) Matias Franco Descotte	6–4, 6–1
Win	6–3	Apr 2017	Israel F4, Ramat Gan	Futures	Hard	(Germany) Mats Moraing	6–3, 5–5 ret.
Win	7–3	May 2017	Israel F6, Akko	Futures	Hard	(Israel) Ben Patael	6–3, 6–3
Loss	7–4	May 2017	Israel F7, Herzlia	Futures	Hard	(Canada) Filip Peliwo	6–4, 1–6, 6–7^{(5–7)}
Loss	7–5	Dec 2017	Israel F16, Ramat HaSharon	Futures	Hard	(Belgium) Yannick Mertens	6–7^{(4–7)}, 3–6
Win	8–5	Jun 2018	Israel F9, Netanya	Futures	Hard	(Italy) Alessandro Bega	6–2, 6–1
Loss	8–6	Oct 2018	Israel F14, Meitar	Futures	Hard	(France) Baptiste Crepatte	6–7^{(8–10)}, 3–6
Loss	8–7	Mar 2019	M15 Tel Aviv, Israel	World Tennis Tour	Hard	(Réunion) Quentin Robert	3–6, 6–2, 1–6
Win	9–7	Sep 2019	M25 Ust-Kamenogorsk, Kazakhstan	World Tennis Tour	Hard	(Russia) Konstantin Kravchuk	2–2 ret.
Loss	9–8	May 2021	M15 Jerusalem, Israel	World Tennis Tour	Hard	(United States) Zane Khan	3–6, 4–6
Loss	9–9	May 2022	M25 Nottingham, United Kingdom	World Tennis Tour	Hard	(United Kingdom) Billy Harris	4–6, 3–6
Loss	9–10	Jun 2022	M15 Ra'anana, Israel	World Tennis Tour	Hard	(Germany) Robert Strombachs	6–7^{(4–7)}, 4–6
Loss	9–11	Aug 2022	M25 Tbilisi, Georgia	World Tennis Tour	Hard	(China) Bu Yunchaokete	3–6, 6–2, 3–6

=== Doubles: 13 (4 titles, 9 runner-ups) ===
Legend (doubles) ATP Challenger Tour (0–1) Futures/ITF World Tennis Tour (4–8)	Finals by surface Hard (4–7) Clay (0–1) Grass (0–0) Carpet (0–1)

Result	W–L	Date	Tournament	Tier	Surface	Partner	Opponents	Score
Loss	0–1	Oct 2013	Israel F15, Herzlia	Futures	Hard	(Israel) Mor Bulis	(United Kingdom) Scott Clayton (United Kingdom) Toby Martin	4–6, 0–6
Win	1–1	May 2015	Israel F5, Ashkelon	Futures	Hard	(Israel) Daniel Cukierman	(Republic of Ireland) Sam Barry (Russia) Evgeny Karlovskiy	7–5, 7–5
Loss	1–2	Sep 2015	Israel F11, Kiryat Gat	Futures	Hard	(Israel) Mor Bulis	(Australia) Jarryd Chaplin (New Zealand) Ben McLachlan	6–7^{(2–7)}, 2–6
Loss	1–3	May 2016	Israel F7, Tel Aviv	Futures	Hard	(Israel) Daniel Cukierman	(United States) Nicolas Meister (United States) Hunter Reese	5–7, 5–7
Loss	1–4	Oct 2017	Ortisei, Italy	Challenger	Hard	(Germany) Jeremy Jahn	(Netherlands) Sander Arends (Croatia) Antonio Šančić	2–6, 7–5, [11–13]
Win	2–4	Jun 2018	Israel F8, Tel Aviv	Futures	Hard	(Israel) Daniel Cukierman	(France) Dan Added (France) Albano Olivetti	6–4, 6–2
Loss	2–5	Feb 2019	M25 Oberentfelden, Switzerland	World Tennis Tour	Carpet	(France) Albano Olivetti	(Czech Republic) Marek Jaloviec (Czech Republic) Michael Vrbenský	5–7, 1–6
Loss	2–6	Sep 2019	M25 Bagnères-de-Bigorre, France	World Tennis Tour	Hard	(France) Albano Olivetti	(France) Jonathan Eysseric (France) Tom Jomby	1–6, 6–3, [3–10]
Loss	2–7	Feb 2022	M15 Oberhaching, Germany	World Tennis Tour	Hard	(Northern Mariana Islands) Colin Sinclair	(Czech Republic) Petr Nouza (Italy) Giovanni Oradini	6–3, 3–6, [11–13]
Loss	2–8	May 2022	M25 Nottingham, United Kingdom	World Tennis Tour	Hard	(Australia) Omar Jasika	(United Kingdom) Julian Cash (United Kingdom) Henry Patten	3–6, 7–5, [2–10]
Win	3–8	May 2022	M15 Akko, Israel	World Tennis Tour	Hard	(Israel) Daniel Cukierman	(United Kingdom) Giles Hussey (United Kingdom) Daniel Little	6–3, 6–4
Win	4–8	Jan 2023	M25 Sunderland, Great Britain	World Tennis Tour	Hard	(Israel) Daniel Cukierman	(United Kingdom) Anton Matusevich (United Kingdom) Joshua Paris	2–6, 6–1, [10–3]
Loss	4–9	Jun 2023	M25 Rome, Italy	World Tennis Tour	Clay	(Italy) Julian Ocleppo	(Denmark) August Holmgren (Austria) David Pichler	4–6, 5–7
