= André Gaspar Murta =

Portuguese tennis player (born 1994)

- Country (sports): Portugal
- Born: 8 August 1994 (age 31) Faro, Portugal
- Height: 1.93 m (6 ft 4 in)
- Plays: Right-handed (two-handed backhand)
- Coach: João Antunes; André Podalca
- Prize money: US$49,002

Singles
- Career record: 1–0
- Career titles: 0
- Highest ranking: No. 480 (19 September 2016)

Doubles
- Career record: 0–0
- Career titles: 0
- Highest ranking: No. 646 (10 February 2014)

André Gaspar Murta (born 8 August 1994) is a Portuguese professional tennis player who currently competes on the ITF Men's Circuit. In September 2016, he achieved a career-high singles ranking of world No. 480.

He is the brother of tennis player Inês Murta.

== Career finals ==
=== ITF Men's Circuit ===
==== Singles: 4 (1 title, 3 runner-ups) ====
Category Futures (1–3)	Finals by surface Hard (0–2) Clay (1–1)	Setting Outdoors (1–3) Indoors (0–0)

Outcome	Date	Category	Tournament	Surface	Opponent	Score
Winner	28 June 2015	Futures	Sibiu, Romania F6	Clay	(Austria) Michael Linzer	1–6, 6–4, 6–4
Runner-up	21 November 2015	Futures	Casablanca, Morocco F5	Clay	(Italy) Stefano Travaglia	4–6, 3–6
Runner-up	15 May 2016	Futures	Lisbon, Portugal F5	Hard	(Italy) Pablo Vivero Gonzalez	3–6, 1–6
Runner-up	24 July 2016	Futures	Idanha-a-Nova, Portugal F9	Hard	(Israel) Ben Patael	6–7^{(2–7)}, 4–6

==== Doubles: 10 (6 titles, 4 runners-up) ====
Category Futures (6–4)	Finals by surface Hard (4–3) Clay (2–1)	Setting Outdoors (6–4) Indoors (0–0)

Outcome	Date	Category	Tournament	Surface	Partner	Opponents	Score
Runner-up	28 April 2012	Futures	Madurai, India F5	Clay	(Italy) Matthieu Vierin	(India) Sriram Balaji (India) Vignesh Peranamallur	6–7^{(4–7)}, 6–7^{(5–7)}
Runner-up	12 May 2013	Futures	Castelo Branco, Portugal F5	Hard	(Portugal) João Domingues	(Spain) Roberto Ortega Olmedo (Spain) Ricardo Villacorta-Alonso	1–6, 4–6
Winner	5 July 2013	Futures	Bakio, Spain F20	Hard	(Portugal) João Domingues	(Spain) Ivan Arenas-Gualda (Spain) Juan Lizariturry	6–2, 6–2
Winner	21 July 2013	Futures	Gandia, Spain F22	Clay	(Portugal) João Domingues	(Venezuela) Luis Fernando Ramírez (Venezuela) David Souto	6–4, 6–4
Runner-up	23 November 2013	Futures	Nicosia, Cyprus F2	Hard	(Italy) Erik Crepaldi	(Belgium) Sander Gillé (France) Matthieu Roy	1–6, 3–6
Winner	25 October 2014	Futures	Ponta Delgada, Portugal F11	Hard	(Portugal) João Domingues	(France) Melik Feler (United Kingdom) Aswin Lizen	6–1, 4–6, [10–8]
Winner	22 November 2014	Futures	Sousse, Tunisia F8	Hard	(Portugal) João Domingues	(Spain) Samuel Ribeiro Navarrete (Spain) Pablo Vivero Gonzalez	7–5, 6–3
Winner	25 October 2015	Futures	Sharm el-Sheikh, Egypt F36	Hard	(Portugal) Frederico Ferreira Silva	(United Kingdom) Luke Bambridge (United Kingdom) Richard Gabb	7–6^{(7–4)}, 6–3
Winner	21 November 2015	Futures	Casablanca, Morocco F5	Clay	(Portugal) Nuno Deus	(Portugal) Gonçalo Falcão (Egypt) Karim Hossam	6–4, 6–2
Runner-up	5 March 2016	Futures	Faro, Portugal F2	Hard	(Italy) Erik Crepaldi	(United Kingdom) Scott Clayton (United Kingdom) Jonny O'Mara	2–6, 5–7

=== ITF Junior Circuit ===
==== Singles: 1 (runner-up) ====
Category Category Grade A (0–0) Category Grade 1 (0–0) Category Grade 2 (0–0) Category Grade 3 (0–0) Category Grade 4 (0–1) Category Grade 5 (0–0)	Finals by surface Hard (0–0) Clay (0–1)	Setting Outdoors (0–1) Indoors (0–0)

Outcome	Date	Category	Tournament	Surface	Opponent	Score
Runner-up	7 August 2011	Grade 4	XVII International Junior Leiria, Portugal	Clay	(Portugal) João Domingues	1–6, 1–6

== Career earnings ==
Year	Majors	ATP wins	Total wins	Earnings	References
2013	0	0	0	$9,119	
2014	0	0	0	$8,580	
2015	0	0	0	$8,628	
2016	0	0	0	$8,271	
2017	0	0	0	* $252	
Career *	0	0	0	$40,075	

* As of 10 April 2017.

== National participation ==
=== Davis Cup (1 win) ===
Gaspar Murta debuted for the Portugal Davis Cup team in 2013 and has played 1 match in 1 tie. His singles record is 1–0 and his doubles record is 0–0 (1–0 overall).

Group membership World Group (0–0) WG Play-off (0–0) Group I (0–0) Group II (1–0) Group III (0–0) Group IV (0–0)	Matches by surface Hard (0–0) Clay (1–0)	Matches by Type Singles (1–0) Doubles (0–0)	Matches by Setting Indoors (1–0) Outdoors (0–0)	Matches by Venue Portugal (1–0) Away (0–0)

- ▲ ▼ indicates the result of the Davis Cup match followed by the score, date, place of event, the zonal classification and its phase, and the court surface.

Rubber result	Rubber	Match type (partner if any)	Opponent nation	Opponent player(s)	Score
▲5–0; 1–3 February 2013; Club Internacional de Football, Lisbon, Portugal; Group II Europe/Africa First Round; Clay(i) surface
Victory	V	Singles (dead rubber)	Benin	Tunde Segodo	6–1, 6–2

== See also ==
- Portugal Davis Cup team
