= Mor Bulis =

Israeli tennis player

- Native name: מור בוליס
- Country (sports): Israel
- Born: 18 April 1996 (age 29) Petah Tikva, Israel
- Prize money: $29,231

Singles
- Career record: 0–1 (at ATP Tour level, Grand Slam level, and in Davis Cup)
- Career titles: 1 ITF
- Highest ranking: No. 488 (14 May 2018)

Doubles
- Career record: 0–0 (at ATP Tour level, Grand Slam level, and in Davis Cup)
- Career titles: 2 ITF
- Highest ranking: No. 654 (25 September 2017)

Mor Bulis (Hebrew: מור בוליס; born 18 April 1996) is an Israeli tennis player.

Bulis has a career-high ATP singles ranking of No. 488 achieved on 14 May 2018 and a career-high ATP doubles ranking of No. 654 achieved on 25 September 2017.

Bulis was born in Petah Tikva, Israel. He plays for the Israel Davis Cup team at the Davis Cup, where he has a W/L record of 1–1.
