= 2015 ITF Men's Circuit (April–June) =

This article includes the 2015 ITF Men's Circuit tournaments which occurred between April and June 2015.

== Point distribution ==
Tournament Category	W	F	SF	QF	R16	R32
Futures 15,000+H	35	20	10	4	1	0
Futures 15,000	27	15	8	3	1	0
Futures 10,000+H	27	15	8	3	1	0
Futures 10,000	18	10	6	2	1	0

== Key ==
$15,000 tournaments
$10,000 tournaments

== Month ==
=== April ===
Week of	Tournament	Winner	Runners-up	Semifinalists	Quarterfinalists
April 6	Chile F3 Futures; Santiago, Chile; Clay $15,000	Hans Podlipnik; 5–7, 6–4, 7–6^{(7–2)}	Nicolás Kicker	Carlos Eduardo Severino; Leonardo Kirche	Federico Coria; Sebastián Exequiel Pini; Duilio Beretta; Gonzalo Lama
April 6	Chile F3 Futures; Santiago, Chile; Clay $15,000	Jorge Aguilar; Hans Podlipnik; 7–6^{(7–4)}, 5–7, [10–4]	Nicolás Kicker; Fabrício Neis	Carlos Eduardo Severino; Leonardo Kirche	Federico Coria; Sebastián Exequiel Pini; Duilio Beretta; Gonzalo Lama
April 6	United States F12 Futures; Harlingen, United States; Hard $15,000	Alexander Sarkissian; 6–4, 6–4	Eric Quigley	Hunter Nicholas; Wil Spencer	Dimitar Kutrovsky; Ernesto Escobedo; Mico Santiago; Philip Bester
April 6	United States F12 Futures; Harlingen, United States; Hard $15,000	Deiton Baughman; Hunter Nicholas; 6–3, 7–6^{(7–3)}	Philip Bester; Dimitar Kutrovsky	Hunter Nicholas; Wil Spencer	Dimitar Kutrovsky; Ernesto Escobedo; Mico Santiago; Philip Bester
April 6	Uzbekistan F1 Futures; Qarshi, Uzbekistan; Hard $15,000	Yuki Bhambri; 6–2, 6–4	Dzmitry Zhyrmont	Chen Ti; Karen Khachanov	Ilya Ivashka; Daniiar Duldaev; Vitaly Kozyukov; Anton Zaitcev
April 6	Uzbekistan F1 Futures; Qarshi, Uzbekistan; Hard $15,000	Aleksandr Vasilenko; Anton Zaitcev; 6–1, 6–7^{(4–7)}, [12–10]	Temur Ismailov; Timur Khabibulin	Chen Ti; Karen Khachanov	Ilya Ivashka; Daniiar Duldaev; Vitaly Kozyukov; Anton Zaitcev
April 6	China F2 Futures; Anning, China; Clay $10,000	Yang Tsung-hua; 6–0, 7–5	Kim Young-seok	Bai Yan; Kim Cheong-eui	Enrique López Pérez; Huang Liang-chi; Wu Di; Boy Westerhof
April 6	China F2 Futures; Anning, China; Clay $10,000	Gao Xin; Ouyang Bowen; 7–6^{(7–3)}, 6–4	Huang Liang-chi; Enrique López Pérez	Bai Yan; Kim Cheong-eui	Enrique López Pérez; Huang Liang-chi; Wu Di; Boy Westerhof
April 6	Egypt F13 Futures; Sharm El Sheikh, Egypt; Hard $10,000	Tucker Vorster; 7–5, 7–5	Martin Fischer	Michal Konečný; Ugo Nastasi	Maciej Smoła; Karim-Mohamed Maamoun; Lucas Miedler; Cristian Carli
April 6	Egypt F13 Futures; Sharm El Sheikh, Egypt; Hard $10,000	Martin Fischer; Jannis Liniger; 6–4, 6–2	Markos Kalovelonis; Lucas Miedler	Michal Konečný; Ugo Nastasi	Maciej Smoła; Karim-Mohamed Maamoun; Lucas Miedler; Cristian Carli
April 6	Greece F3 Futures; Heraklion, Greece; Hard $10,000	Maxim Dubarenco; 6–7^{(3–7)}, 6–2, 6–3	Edoardo Eremin	Václav Šafránek; Matteo Berrettini	Michael Geerts; Hugo Grenier; Daniel Masur; Konstantinos Economidis
April 6	Greece F3 Futures; Heraklion, Greece; Hard $10,000	Maxim Dubarenco; Vladyslav Manafov; 6–1, 6–0	Antoine Bellier; Hugo Grenier	Václav Šafránek; Matteo Berrettini	Michael Geerts; Hugo Grenier; Daniel Masur; Konstantinos Economidis
April 6	Indonesia F2 Futures; Tegal, Indonesia; Hard $10,000	Lee Duck-hee; 6–1, 3–0 retired	Shuichi Sekiguchi	David Agung Susanto; Finn Tearney	Sora Fukuda; Christopher Rungkat; Wang Chieh-fu; Jeson Patrombon
April 6	Indonesia F2 Futures; Tegal, Indonesia; Hard $10,000	Toshihide Matsui; Christopher Rungkat; 6–4, 6–2	Aditya Hari Sasongko; Sunu Wahyu Trijati	David Agung Susanto; Finn Tearney	Sora Fukuda; Christopher Rungkat; Wang Chieh-fu; Jeson Patrombon
April 6	Italy F4 Futures; Pula, Italy; Clay $10,000	Gianluca Naso; 0–6, 6–4, 6–4	Omar Giacalone	Marco Bortolotti; Johan Sébastien Tatlot	Juan Lizariturry; Nicolò Turchetti; Demian Raab; Yannick Maden
April 6	Italy F4 Futures; Pula, Italy; Clay $10,000	Davide Della Tommasina; Riccardo Sinicropi; 6–3, 6–1	Francesco Borgo; Gianluca Naso	Marco Bortolotti; Johan Sébastien Tatlot	Juan Lizariturry; Nicolò Turchetti; Demian Raab; Yannick Maden
April 6	Qatar F2 Futures; Doha, Qatar; Hard $10,000	Adrien Bossel; 6–3, 6–4	Rui Machado	Marko Tepavac; Jaroslav Pospíšil	David Rice; Joshua Milton; Patrik Fabian; Evgeny Karlovskiy
April 6	Qatar F2 Futures; Doha, Qatar; Hard $10,000	Dominik Kellovský; Jaroslav Pospíšil; 6–1, 2–6, [12–10]	Patrik Fabian; Jonas Merckx	Marko Tepavac; Jaroslav Pospíšil	David Rice; Joshua Milton; Patrik Fabian; Evgeny Karlovskiy
April 6	Spain F8 Futures; Madrid, Spain; Hard $10,000	Carlos Boluda Purkiss; 3–6, 6–3, 6–2	Alexandre Folie	Oriol Roca Batalla; Matthew Short	Iván Arenas-Gualda; Mateo Nicolás Martínez; Denis Yevseyev; Roberto Ortega Olmedo
April 6	Spain F8 Futures; Madrid, Spain; Hard $10,000	Juan-Samuel Arauzo-Martínez; Iván Arenas-Gualda; 6–7^{(6–8)}, 6–4, [10–4]	Carlos Boluda Purkiss; Roberto Ortega Olmedo	Oriol Roca Batalla; Matthew Short	Iván Arenas-Gualda; Mateo Nicolás Martínez; Denis Yevseyev; Roberto Ortega Olmedo
April 6	Tunisia F13 Futures; Port El Kantaoui, Tunisia; Hard $10,000	Daniil Medvedev; 6–4, 6–0	Tom Jomby	Petr Michnev; Jeroen Vanneste	Viktor Durasovic; Alessandro Bega; Baptiste Crepatte; Victor Ouvrard
April 6	Tunisia F13 Futures; Port El Kantaoui, Tunisia; Hard $10,000	Anis Ghorbel; Vasko Mladenov; 4–6, 6–1, [11–9]	Rémy Chala; Daniil Medvedev	Petr Michnev; Jeroen Vanneste	Viktor Durasovic; Alessandro Bega; Baptiste Crepatte; Victor Ouvrard
April 6	Turkey F14 Futures; Antalya, Turkey; Hard $10,000	Maximilian Neuchrist; 4–6, 6–1, 6–1	Claudio Fortuna	Marat Deviatiarov; Peter Heller	Maxime Janvier; Nico Matic; Pascal Brunner; Richard Gabb
April 6	Turkey F14 Futures; Antalya, Turkey; Hard $10,000	Richard Gabb; Maximilian Neuchrist; 6–2, 6–4	Antoine Escoffier; Cesar Testoni	Marat Deviatiarov; Peter Heller	Maxime Janvier; Nico Matic; Pascal Brunner; Richard Gabb
April 13	Chile F4 Futures; Santiago, Chile; Clay $15,000	Juan Carlos Sáez; 0–6, 7–6^{(8–6)}, 6–3	Christian Lindell	Nicolás Jarry; Carlos Eduardo Severino	Franco Agamenone; Nicolás Kicker; Nicolás Alberto Arreche; Ricardo Urzúa Rivera
April 13	Chile F4 Futures; Santiago, Chile; Clay $15,000	Jorge Aguilar; Duilio Beretta; 6–1, 6–4	André Miele; Alexandre Tsuchiya	Nicolás Jarry; Carlos Eduardo Severino	Franco Agamenone; Nicolás Kicker; Nicolás Alberto Arreche; Ricardo Urzúa Rivera
April 13	United States F13 Futures; Little Rock, United States; Hard $15,000	Jason Jung; 6–3, 4–6, 6–4	Darian King	Dane Propoggia; Eric Quigley	Oscar Fabian Matthews; Dimitar Kutrovsky; Keith-Patrick Crowley; Alexander Sarkissian
April 13	United States F13 Futures; Little Rock, United States; Hard $15,000	Keith-Patrick Crowley; Hans Hach Verdugo; 6–3, 1–6, [10–7]	Eric Quigley; Matt Seeberger	Dane Propoggia; Eric Quigley	Oscar Fabian Matthews; Dimitar Kutrovsky; Keith-Patrick Crowley; Alexander Sarkissian
April 13	Uzbekistan F2 Futures; Bukhara, Uzbekistan; Hard $15,000	Karen Khachanov; 7–5, 4–6, 6–3	Dzmitry Zhyrmont	Ilya Ivashka; Jurabek Karimov	Chen Ti; Vishnu Vardhan; Anton Zaitcev; Evgenii Tiurnev
April 13	Uzbekistan F2 Futures; Bukhara, Uzbekistan; Hard $15,000	Artur Dubinski; Volodymyr Uzhylovskyi; 6–4, 6–4	Evgeny Elistratov; Evgenii Tiurnev	Ilya Ivashka; Jurabek Karimov	Chen Ti; Vishnu Vardhan; Anton Zaitcev; Evgenii Tiurnev
April 13	China F3 Futures; Anning, China; Clay $10,000	Huang Liang-chi; 6–3, 6–2	Yang Tsung-hua	Kim Cheong-eui; Enrique López Pérez	Chung Yun-seong; Li Zhe; Wang Chuhan; Wu Di
April 13	China F3 Futures; Anning, China; Clay $10,000	Kim Cheong-eui; Issei Okamura; 3–3 retired	Huang Liang-chi; Enrique López Pérez	Kim Cheong-eui; Enrique López Pérez	Chung Yun-seong; Li Zhe; Wang Chuhan; Wu Di
April 13	Egypt F14 Futures; Sharm El Sheikh, Egypt; Hard $10,000	Dennis Novak; 2–6, 6–1, 6–3	Martin Fischer	Jordan Ubiergo; Karim-Mohamed Maamoun	Maciej Smoła; Karol Drzewiecki; Lloyd Harris; Artem Smirnov
April 13	Egypt F14 Futures; Sharm El Sheikh, Egypt; Hard $10,000	Jānis Podžus; Mārtiņš Podžus; 6–0, 0–6, [10–7]	Martin Fischer; Jannis Liniger	Jordan Ubiergo; Karim-Mohamed Maamoun	Maciej Smoła; Karol Drzewiecki; Lloyd Harris; Artem Smirnov
April 13	Greece F4 Futures; Heraklion, Greece; Hard $10,000	Edoardo Eremin; 6–1, 6–1	Alexandros Jakupovic	Markus Eriksson; Arthur Surreaux	Matteo Berrettini; Vladyslav Manafov; Erik Crepaldi; Markos Kalovelonis
April 13	Greece F4 Futures; Heraklion, Greece; Hard $10,000	Alexandros Jakupovic; Markos Kalovelonis; 6–1, 6–2	Joe Salisbury; Joshua Ward-Hibbert	Markus Eriksson; Arthur Surreaux	Matteo Berrettini; Vladyslav Manafov; Erik Crepaldi; Markos Kalovelonis
April 13	Indonesia F3 Futures; Jakarta, Indonesia; Hard $10,000	Lee Duck-hee; 6–4, 6–3	Christopher Rungkat	Kento Takeuchi; Danai Udomchoke	Jeevan Nedunchezhiyan; Finn Tearney; Kittiphong Wachiramanowong; Hung Jui-chen
April 13	Indonesia F3 Futures; Jakarta, Indonesia; Hard $10,000	Toshihide Matsui; Christopher Rungkat; 6–4, 6–2	Jeevan Nedunchezhiyan; Danai Udomchoke	Kento Takeuchi; Danai Udomchoke	Jeevan Nedunchezhiyan; Finn Tearney; Kittiphong Wachiramanowong; Hung Jui-chen
April 13	Italy F5 Futures; Pula, Italy; Clay $10,000	Federico Gaio; 6–2, 6–4	Stefano Napolitano	Riccardo Bonadio; Gianluca Mager	Riccardo Sinicropi; Leonardo Tavares; Vasile Antonescu; Pietro Licciardi
April 13	Italy F5 Futures; Pula, Italy; Clay $10,000	Davide Melchiorre; Riccardo Sinicropi; 7–5, 6–0	Marc-Andrea Hüsler; Loïc Perret	Riccardo Bonadio; Gianluca Mager	Riccardo Sinicropi; Leonardo Tavares; Vasile Antonescu; Pietro Licciardi
April 13	Qatar F3 Futures; Doha, Qatar; Hard $10,000	David Rice; 4–6, 7–6^{(7–4)}, 6–2	Patrik Fabian	Joshua Milton; Tom Kočevar-Dešman	Kirill Dmitriev; James Marsalek; Scott Clayton; Adrien Bossel
April 13	Qatar F3 Futures; Doha, Qatar; Hard $10,000	Scott Clayton; James Marsalek; 6–3, 6–2	Kirill Dmitriev; Dmitry Popko	Joshua Milton; Tom Kočevar-Dešman	Kirill Dmitriev; James Marsalek; Scott Clayton; Adrien Bossel
April 13	Spain F9 Futures; Reus, Spain; Clay $10,000	Kamil Majchrzak; 6–3, 6–2	Marc Giner	Eduard Esteve Lobato; Albert Alcaraz Ivorra	Pedro Sousa; Maxime Chazal; Carlos Gómez-Herrera; Maciej Rajski
April 13	Spain F9 Futures; Reus, Spain; Clay $10,000	Sergio Martos Gornés; Pol Toledo Bagué; 3–6, 6–1, [10–6]	Juan-Samuel Arauzo-Martínez; Mateo Nicolás Martínez	Eduard Esteve Lobato; Albert Alcaraz Ivorra	Pedro Sousa; Maxime Chazal; Carlos Gómez-Herrera; Maciej Rajski
April 13	Tunisia F14 Futures; Port El Kantaoui, Tunisia; Hard $10,000	Sébastien Boltz; 6–0, 7–5	Ronan Joncour	Daniil Medvedev; Tom Jomby	Filip Horanský; Alessandro Bega; Thomas Grinberg; David Pérez Sanz
April 13	Tunisia F14 Futures; Port El Kantaoui, Tunisia; Hard $10,000	Filip Horanský; Vadym Ursu; 6–4, 6–2	Gregorio Cordonnier; Jordan Dyke	Daniil Medvedev; Tom Jomby	Filip Horanský; Alessandro Bega; Thomas Grinberg; David Pérez Sanz
April 13	Turkey F15 Futures; Antalya, Turkey; Hard $10,000	Riccardo Bellotti; 6–4, 6–2	Yannick Jankovits	Pascal Brunner; Marat Deviatiarov	Richard Gabb; Maximilian Neuchrist; Adrian Sikora; Jaime Pulgar-García
April 13	Turkey F15 Futures; Antalya, Turkey; Hard $10,000	Richard Gabb; Maximilian Neuchrist; 6–2, 6–3	Riccardo Bellotti; Pascal Brunner	Pascal Brunner; Marat Deviatiarov	Richard Gabb; Maximilian Neuchrist; Adrian Sikora; Jaime Pulgar-García
April 20	China F4 Futures; Yuxi, China; Hard $15,000	Grega Žemlja; 7–6^{(7–4)}, 6–3	Kim Cheong-eui	Sun Fajing; Wu Di	Li Zhe; Cao Zhaoyi; Wang Chuhan; Kim Young-seok
April 20	China F4 Futures; Yuxi, China; Hard $15,000	Gao Xin; Li Zhe; 6–4, 6–4	Kim Cheong-eui; Boy Westerhof	Sun Fajing; Wu Di	Li Zhe; Cao Zhaoyi; Wang Chuhan; Kim Young-seok
April 20	France F8 Futures; Angers, France; Clay (indoor) $15,000+H	Jonathan Eysseric; 6–3, 7–6^{(7–2)}	Mathias Bourgue	Grégoire Barrère; David Guez	Corentin Moutet; Sadio Doumbia; Miljan Zekić; Johan Sébastien Tatlot
April 20	France F8 Futures; Angers, France; Clay (indoor) $15,000+H	Jonathan Eysseric; Tom Jomby; 6–3, 6–4	Sebastian Bader; Tristan-Samuel Weissborn	Grégoire Barrère; David Guez	Corentin Moutet; Sadio Doumbia; Miljan Zekić; Johan Sébastien Tatlot
April 20	Kazakhstan F3 Futures; Shymkent, Kazakhstan; Clay $15,000	Temur Ismailov; 7–6^{(7–2)}, 6–2	Yaraslav Shyla	Sanjar Fayziev; Daniiar Duldaev	Anton Zaitcev; Dmytro Badanov; Evgenii Tiurnev; Denis Yevseyev
April 20	Kazakhstan F3 Futures; Shymkent, Kazakhstan; Clay $15,000	Yaraslav Shyla; Andrei Vasilevski; 4–6, 6–3, [10–6]	Ivan Gakhov; Evgenii Tiurnev	Sanjar Fayziev; Daniiar Duldaev	Anton Zaitcev; Dmytro Badanov; Evgenii Tiurnev; Denis Yevseyev
April 20	Spain F10 Futures; Majadahonda, Spain; Clay $15,000	Adrien Puget; 4–6, 6–3, 7–5	Juan-Samuel Arauzo-Martínez	Jean-Marc Werner; Marc Giner	Georgi Rumenov Payakov; Flavio Cipolla; José Checa Calvo; Roberto Ortega Olmedo
April 20	Spain F10 Futures; Majadahonda, Spain; Clay $15,000	Juan-Samuel Arauzo-Martínez; Iván Arenas-Gualda; 6–3, 6–4	José Checa Calvo; Flavio Cipolla	Jean-Marc Werner; Marc Giner	Georgi Rumenov Payakov; Flavio Cipolla; José Checa Calvo; Roberto Ortega Olmedo
April 20	Chile F5 Futures; Santiago, Chile; Clay $10,000	Jorge Aguilar; 6–4, 4–6, 6–3	Duilio Beretta	Juan Ignacio Ameal; Bastián Malla	Franco Agamenone; Juan Ignacio Galarza; Gonzalo Villanueva; Juan Pablo Ficovich
April 20	Chile F5 Futures; Santiago, Chile; Clay $10,000	Jorge Aguilar; Duilio Beretta; 6–2, 6–2	Juan Pablo Ficovich; Mariano Kestelboim	Juan Ignacio Ameal; Bastián Malla	Franco Agamenone; Juan Ignacio Galarza; Gonzalo Villanueva; Juan Pablo Ficovich
April 20	Egypt F15 Futures; Sharm El Sheikh, Egypt; Hard $10,000	Dennis Novak; 6–2, 7–6^{(7–4)}	Mohamed Safwat	Denis Bejtulahi; Sherif Sabry	Jordan Ubiergo; Denis Matsukevich; Henrik Sillanpää; Artem Smirnov
April 20	Egypt F15 Futures; Sharm El Sheikh, Egypt; Hard $10,000	Sergiy Sergiienko; Artem Smirnov; 6–3, 6–4	Denis Matsukevich; Vladimir Polyakov	Denis Bejtulahi; Sherif Sabry	Jordan Ubiergo; Denis Matsukevich; Henrik Sillanpää; Artem Smirnov
April 20	Greece F5 Futures; Heraklion, Greece; Hard $10,000	Hiroyasu Ehara; 6–3, 0–6, 6–3	Erik Crepaldi	Tom Kočevar-Dešman; David Šimůnek	Fran Zvonimir Zgombić; Joe Salisbury; Joshua Ward-Hibbert; Danilo Petrović
April 20	Greece F5 Futures; Heraklion, Greece; Hard $10,000	Danilo Petrović; Ilija Vučić; 6–4, 6–7^{(5–7)}, [10–7]	Hiroyasu Ehara; Keisuke Watanuki	Tom Kočevar-Dešman; David Šimůnek	Fran Zvonimir Zgombić; Joe Salisbury; Joshua Ward-Hibbert; Danilo Petrović
April 20	Italy F6 Futures; Pula, Italy; Clay $10,000	Viktor Durasovic; 6–3, 6–2	Viktor Galović	Marco Bortolotti; Federico Gaio	Pavel Nejedlý; Frederico Gil; Scott Griekspoor; Pol Toledo Bagué
April 20	Italy F6 Futures; Pula, Italy; Clay $10,000	Marco Bortolotti; Davide Della Tommasina; 6–4, 6–4	Viktor Galović; Antonio Massara	Marco Bortolotti; Federico Gaio	Pavel Nejedlý; Frederico Gil; Scott Griekspoor; Pol Toledo Bagué
April 20	Thailand F1 Futures; Bangkok, Thailand; Hard $10,000	Akira Santillan; 6–3, 6–2	Kento Takeuchi	Lim Yong-kyu; Singekrawee Wattanakul	Chen Ti; Toshihide Matsui; Shunrou Takeshima; Andre Dome
April 20	Thailand F1 Futures; Bangkok, Thailand; Hard $10,000	Toshihide Matsui; Christopher Rungkat; 4–6, 6–3, [10–8]	Sanchai Ratiwatana; Sonchat Ratiwatana	Lim Yong-kyu; Singekrawee Wattanakul	Chen Ti; Toshihide Matsui; Shunrou Takeshima; Andre Dome
April 20	Tunisia F15 Futures; Port El Kantaoui, Tunisia; Hard $10,000	Filip Horanský; 6–4, 6–2	Christopher Heyman	Jonathan Kanar; Hugo Grenier	Teri Groll; Antoine Escoffier; Matthias Haim; Francesco Vilardo
April 20	Tunisia F15 Futures; Port El Kantaoui, Tunisia; Hard $10,000	Sam Barry; Antoine Escoffier; 6–3, 6–2	Anis Ghorbel; Victor Ouvrard	Jonathan Kanar; Hugo Grenier	Teri Groll; Antoine Escoffier; Matthias Haim; Francesco Vilardo
April 20	Turkey F16 Futures; Antalya, Turkey; Hard $10,000	Yannick Jankovits; 6–7^{(4–7)}, 6–0, 6–1	Hugo Nys	Nerman Fatić; Miki Janković	Jaime Pulgar-García; Adrian Sikora; Marat Deviatiarov; Thomas Schoorel
April 20	Turkey F16 Futures; Antalya, Turkey; Hard $10,000	Yannick Jankovits; Hugo Nys; 7–6^{(8–6)}, 6–1	Marat Deviatiarov; Michael Geerts	Nerman Fatić; Miki Janković	Jaime Pulgar-García; Adrian Sikora; Marat Deviatiarov; Thomas Schoorel
April 27	France F9 Futures; Grasse, France; Clay $15,000	Maxime Chazal; 6–2, 7–5	Romain Arneodo	Yann Marti; Daniil Medvedev	Calvin Hemery; Quentin Halys; Johan Sébastien Tatlot; Martin Beran
April 27	France F9 Futures; Grasse, France; Clay $15,000	Julien Dubail; Daniil Medvedev; 6–4, 6–4	Maxime Chazal; Jérôme Inzerillo	Yann Marti; Daniil Medvedev	Calvin Hemery; Quentin Halys; Johan Sébastien Tatlot; Martin Beran
April 27	Kazakhstan F4 Futures; Shymkent, Kazakhstan; Clay $15,000	Yaraslav Shyla; 6–4, 6–3	Vladimir Ivanov	Anton Zaitcev; Denis Yevseyev	Sanjar Fayziev; Ivan Gakhov; George Tsivadze; Olexiy Kolisnyk
April 27	Kazakhstan F4 Futures; Shymkent, Kazakhstan; Clay $15,000	Yaraslav Shyla; Andrei Vasilevski; 6–2, 7–6^{(7–4)}	Vladimir Ivanov; Volodymyr Uzhylovskyi	Anton Zaitcev; Denis Yevseyev	Sanjar Fayziev; Ivan Gakhov; George Tsivadze; Olexiy Kolisnyk
April 27	Mexico F1 Futures; Morelia, Mexico; Hard $15,000	Nicolás Barrientos; 5–7, 6–3, 6–4	Alexander Sarkissian	Iván Endara; Hans Hach Verdugo	Rémi Boutillier; Hunter Nicholas; Jorge Brian Panta; Lucas Gómez
April 27	Mexico F1 Futures; Morelia, Mexico; Hard $15,000	Hans Hach Verdugo; Luis David Martínez; 6–2, 7–6^{(7–0)}	Oscar Fabian Matthews; Hunter Nicholas	Iván Endara; Hans Hach Verdugo	Rémi Boutillier; Hunter Nicholas; Jorge Brian Panta; Lucas Gómez
April 27	Nigeria F1 Futures; Abuja, Nigeria; Hard $15,000+H	Matija Pecotić; 6–3, 6–4	Deiton Baughman	Keith-Patrick Crowley; Evan Song	Jeevan Nedunchezhiyan; Stanislav Korshunov; Moses Michael; Tucker Vorster
April 27	Nigeria F1 Futures; Abuja, Nigeria; Hard $15,000+H	Deiton Baughman; Eric Quigley; 6–1, 6–4	Jeevan Nedunchezhiyan; Matija Pecotić	Keith-Patrick Crowley; Evan Song	Jeevan Nedunchezhiyan; Stanislav Korshunov; Moses Michael; Tucker Vorster
April 27	Egypt F16 Futures; Sharm El Sheikh, Egypt; Hard $10,000	Marko Tepavac; 6–4, 6–4	Mohamed Safwat	Barış Ergüden; Issam Haitham Taweel	Karim-Mohamed Maamoun; Dennis Bejtulahi; Thomas Bréchemier; Sander Gillé
April 27	Egypt F16 Futures; Sharm El Sheikh, Egypt; Hard $10,000	Karim Hossam; Issam Haitham Taweel; 3–6, 6–3, [12–10]	Alex Blumenberger; Barış Ergüden	Barış Ergüden; Issam Haitham Taweel	Karim-Mohamed Maamoun; Dennis Bejtulahi; Thomas Bréchemier; Sander Gillé
April 27	Greece F6 Futures; Heraklion, Greece; Hard $10,000	Erik Crepaldi; 6–2, 6–2	Alessandro Bega	Harry Bourchier; Danilo Petrović	Justin Shane; Michal Konečný; Tom Kočevar-Dešman; Giacomo Miccini
April 27	Greece F6 Futures; Heraklion, Greece; Hard $10,000	Alexandros Jakupovic; Stefanos Tsitsipas; 6–3, 3–6, [10–7]	Danilo Petrović; Ilija Vučić	Harry Bourchier; Danilo Petrović	Justin Shane; Michal Konečný; Tom Kočevar-Dešman; Giacomo Miccini
April 27	Israel F4 Futures; Ashkelon, Israel; Hard $10,000	Amir Weintraub; 6–3, 6–4	Evgeny Karlovskiy	Sam Barry; Ben Patael	Dekel Bar; Toby Martin; Bar Tzuf Botzer; Peter Kobelt
April 27	Israel F4 Futures; Ashkelon, Israel; Hard $10,000	Sam Barry; Evgeny Karlovskiy; 6–2, 5–7, [12–10]	Hugo Grenier; Siméon Rossier	Sam Barry; Ben Patael	Dekel Bar; Toby Martin; Bar Tzuf Botzer; Peter Kobelt
April 27	Italy F7 Futures; Pula, Italy; Clay $10,000	Samuel Bensoussan; 4–6, 6–3, 6–2	Omar Giacalone	Filippo Leonardi; Adria Mas Mascolo	Marco Bortolotti; Ljubomir Čelebić; Viktor Durasovic; Daniele Capecchi
April 27	Italy F7 Futures; Pula, Italy; Clay $10,000	Marco Bortolotti; Francesco Moncagatto; 3–6, 6–0, [10–8]	Patricio Heras; Giorgio Portaluri	Filippo Leonardi; Adria Mas Mascolo	Marco Bortolotti; Ljubomir Čelebić; Viktor Durasovic; Daniele Capecchi
April 27	Spain F11 Futures; Móstoles, Spain; Hard $10,000	Marcus Willis; 6–7^{(14–16)}, 6–3, 7–6^{(10–8)}	Jorge Hernando-Ruano	Pablo Vivero González; José Checa Calvo	Federico Zeballos; Iván Arenas-Gualda; Javier Pulgar-García; Tom Jomby
April 27	Spain F11 Futures; Móstoles, Spain; Hard $10,000	Juan-Samuel Arauzo-Martínez; Iván Arenas-Gualda; 6–3, 5–7, [10–5]	José Checa Calvo; Marcus Willis	Pablo Vivero González; José Checa Calvo	Federico Zeballos; Iván Arenas-Gualda; Javier Pulgar-García; Tom Jomby
April 27	Sweden F1 Futures; Karlskrona, Sweden; Clay $10,000	Fred Simonsson; 6–1, 6–3	Timon Reichelt	Markus Eriksson; Tobias Blomgren	Colin van Beem; Jacob Adaktusson; Christoffer Solberg; Tomislav Jotovski
April 27	Sweden F1 Futures; Karlskrona, Sweden; Clay $10,000	Timon Reichelt; George von Massow; 7–5, 6–4	Andrew Bettles; Richard Gabb	Markus Eriksson; Tobias Blomgren	Colin van Beem; Jacob Adaktusson; Christoffer Solberg; Tomislav Jotovski
April 27	Thailand F2 Futures; Bangkok, Thailand; Hard $10,000	Andre Dome; 6–4, 6–7^{(7–9)}, 6–1	Akira Santillan	Christopher O'Connell; Raymond Sarmiento	Lim Yong-kyu; Warit Sornbutnark; Finn Tearney; Lý Hoàng Nam
April 27	Thailand F2 Futures; Bangkok, Thailand; Hard $10,000	Yuichi Ito; Sho Katayama; 6–4, 6–4	Ken Onoda; Masato Shiga	Christopher O'Connell; Raymond Sarmiento	Lim Yong-kyu; Warit Sornbutnark; Finn Tearney; Lý Hoàng Nam
April 27	Turkey F17 Futures; Antalya, Turkey; Hard $10,000	Peter Heller; 6–3, 1–6, 6–3	Lucas Miedler	Evgeny Elistratov; Maximilian Neuchrist	David Volfson; Lucas Catarina; Sandro Ehrat; Michael Geerts
April 27	Turkey F17 Futures; Antalya, Turkey; Hard $10,000	Lucas Miedler; Maximilian Neuchrist; 4–6, 6–3, [10–7]	Antoine Bellier; Hugo Nys	Evgeny Elistratov; Maximilian Neuchrist	David Volfson; Lucas Catarina; Sandro Ehrat; Michael Geerts
April 27	United States F14 Futures; Vero Beach, United States; Clay $10,000	Wil Spencer; 6–3, 6–4	Facundo Mena	Maximiliano Estévez; Michael Mmoh	Eduardo Agustín Torre; Gregory Ouellette; Ben McLachlan; Ryan Haviland
April 27	United States F14 Futures; Vero Beach, United States; Clay $10,000	Jesús Bandrés; Luis Fernando Ramírez; 7–6^{(7–3)}, 6–1	Maximiliano Estévez; Christopher Helliar	Maximiliano Estévez; Michael Mmoh	Eduardo Agustín Torre; Gregory Ouellette; Ben McLachlan; Ryan Haviland

=== May ===
Week of	Tournament	Winner	Runners-up	Semifinalists	Quarterfinalists
May 4
May 4	Nigeria F2 Futures; Abuja, Nigeria; Hard $15,000+H	Matija Pecotić; 7–5, 6–3	Eric Quigley	Evan Song; Keith-Patrick Crowley	Ivo Klec; Deiton Baughman; Tucker Vorster; Jeevan Nedunchezhiyan
May 4	Nigeria F2 Futures; Abuja, Nigeria; Hard $15,000+H	Jeevan Nedunchezhiyan; Matija Pecotić; 6–4, 3–6, [10–4]	Keith-Patrick Crowley; Tucker Vorster	Evan Song; Keith-Patrick Crowley	Ivo Klec; Deiton Baughman; Tucker Vorster; Jeevan Nedunchezhiyan
May 4	Algeria F1 Futures; Oran, Algeria; Clay $10,000	Mario Vilella Martínez; 7–6^{(7–4)}, 6–3	David Pérez Sanz	Yannick Thivant; Ugo Nastasi	Matías Franco Descotte; Jonathan Kanar; Daniel Glancy; Sadio Doumbia
May 4	Algeria F1 Futures; Oran, Algeria; Clay $10,000	Halit Berke Mangaloğlu; David Pérez Sanz; 5–7, 6–2, [10–4]	Matías Castro; Matías Franco Descotte	Yannick Thivant; Ugo Nastasi	Matías Franco Descotte; Jonathan Kanar; Daniel Glancy; Sadio Doumbia
May 4	Argentina F4 Futures; Villa María, Argentina; Clay $10,000	Franco Agamenone; 6–3, 7–6^{(7–4)}	Hernán Casanova	Francisco Bahamonde; Juan Pablo Paz	Franco Emanuel Egea; Mariano Kestelboim; Ricardo Urzua-Rivera; Tomás Lipovšek Puches
May 4	Argentina F4 Futures; Villa María, Argentina; Clay $10,000	Alan Kohen; Ricardo Urzua-Rivera; 7–6^{(7–5)}, 6–1	Hernán Casanova; Juan Ignacio Galarza	Francisco Bahamonde; Juan Pablo Paz	Franco Emanuel Egea; Mariano Kestelboim; Ricardo Urzua-Rivera; Tomás Lipovšek Puches
May 4	Croatia F8 Futures; Bol, Croatia; Clay $10,000	Tomislav Brkić; 6–2, 6–4	Václav Šafránek	Grégoire Barrère; Miljan Zekić	Maverick Banes; Kevin Krawietz; Jérôme Inzerillo; Dušan Lojda
May 4	Croatia F8 Futures; Bol, Croatia; Clay $10,000	Grégoire Barrère; Jérôme Inzerillo; 4–6, 7–5, [10–6]	Ivan Sabanov; Matej Sabanov	Grégoire Barrère; Miljan Zekić	Maverick Banes; Kevin Krawietz; Jérôme Inzerillo; Dušan Lojda
May 4	Egypt F17 Futures; Sharm El Sheikh, Egypt; Hard $10,000	Daniel Evans; 6–2, 6–7^{(3–7)}, 6–3	Barış Ergüden	Tomáš Papík; Adrian Andrzejczuk	Marko Tepavac; Karim-Mohamed Maamoun; Sherif Sabry; Elmar Ejupovic
May 4	Egypt F17 Futures; Sharm El Sheikh, Egypt; Hard $10,000	Karim-Mohamed Maamoun; Sherif Sabry; 6–4, 6–2	Barış Ergüden; Cem İlkel	Tomáš Papík; Adrian Andrzejczuk	Marko Tepavac; Karim-Mohamed Maamoun; Sherif Sabry; Elmar Ejupovic
May 4	Israel F5 Futures; Ashkelon, Israel; Hard $10,000	Amir Weintraub; 7–5, 6–4	Toby Martin	Hugo Grenier; Bar Tzuf Botzer	Sam Barry; Ben Patael; Joshua Paris; Siméon Rossier
May 4	Israel F5 Futures; Ashkelon, Israel; Hard $10,000	Daniel Cukierman; Edan Leshem; 7–5, 7–5	Sam Barry; Evgeny Karlovskiy	Hugo Grenier; Bar Tzuf Botzer	Sam Barry; Ben Patael; Joshua Paris; Siméon Rossier
May 4	Italy F8 Futures; Santa Margherita di Pula, Italy; Clay $10,000	Gianluca Naso; 6–4, 4–6, 7–6^{(11–9)}	Patricio Heras	Alessandro Colella; Calvin Hemery	Mateo Nicolás Martínez; Jacopo Stefanini; Omar Giacalone; Matteo Trevisan
May 4	Italy F8 Futures; Santa Margherita di Pula, Italy; Clay $10,000	Riccardo Bonadio; Pietro Rondoni; 6–3, 3–6, [10–8]	Francesco Borgo; Gianluca Naso	Alessandro Colella; Calvin Hemery	Mateo Nicolás Martínez; Jacopo Stefanini; Omar Giacalone; Matteo Trevisan
May 4	Mexico F2 Futures; Querétaro, Mexico; Hard $10,000	Alexander Sarkissian; 6–4, 6–3	Manuel Sánchez	Adam El Mihdawy; Luis David Martínez	Tigre Hank; Mauricio Echazú; Christopher Díaz Figueroa; Iván Endara
May 4	Mexico F2 Futures; Querétaro, Mexico; Hard $10,000	Iván Endara; Lucas Gómez; 6–1, 6–4	Oscar Fabian Matthews; Hunter Nicholas	Adam El Mihdawy; Luis David Martínez	Tigre Hank; Mauricio Echazú; Christopher Díaz Figueroa; Iván Endara
May 4	Portugal F4 Futures; Caldas da Rainha, Portugal; Clay $10,000	Frederico Gil; 3–1 retired	Romain Barbosa	João Domingues; Bruno Sant'Anna	Frederico Ferreira Silva; David Vega Hernández; Fabrício Neis; Ricardo Ojeda Lara
May 4	Portugal F4 Futures; Caldas da Rainha, Portugal; Clay $10,000	Frederico Gil; Frederico Ferreira Silva; 6–3, 6–2	João Domingues; David Vega Hernández	João Domingues; Bruno Sant'Anna	Frederico Ferreira Silva; David Vega Hernández; Fabrício Neis; Ricardo Ojeda Lara
May 4	Romania F1 Futures; Galați, Romania; Clay $10,000	Alexandar Lazov; 4–6, 7–5, 6–4	Dmitry Popko	Maxim Dubarenco; Francesco Vilardo	Dragoș Dima; Petru-Alexandru Luncanu; Kirill Dmitriev; Bastian Wagner
May 4	Romania F1 Futures; Galați, Romania; Clay $10,000	Alexandru-Daniel Carpen; Luca George Tatomir; 7–5, 6–3	Luca Margaroli; Tristan-Samuel Weissborn	Maxim Dubarenco; Francesco Vilardo	Dragoș Dima; Petru-Alexandru Luncanu; Kirill Dmitriev; Bastian Wagner
May 4	Spain F12 Futures; Lleida, Spain; Clay $10,000	Gerard Granollers; 1–6, 7–6^{(7–5)}, 6–4	Álvaro López San Martín	Jaume Munar; José Checa Calvo	Marcos Giraldi Requena; Yannik Reuter; Sergio Castellón Guasch; Eduard Güell Bartrina
May 4	Spain F12 Futures; Lleida, Spain; Clay $10,000	Sergio Martos Gornés; Pol Toledo Bagué; 6–7^{(3–7)}, 6–3, [10–5]	Juan-Samuel Arauzo-Martínez; Iván Arenas-Gualda	Jaume Munar; José Checa Calvo	Marcos Giraldi Requena; Yannik Reuter; Sergio Castellón Guasch; Eduard Güell Bartrina
May 4	Sweden F2 Futures; Båstad, Sweden; Clay $10,000	Michael Linzer; 6–4, 6–2	Mārtiņš Podžus	Markus Eriksson; Jonathan Mridha	Hugo Dellien; Neil Pauffley; Henrik Sillanpää; Richard Gabb
May 4	Sweden F2 Futures; Båstad, Sweden; Clay $10,000	Jonathan Mridha; Fred Simonsson; 6–1, 6–7^{(5–7)}, [10–7]	Daniel Appelgren; Mikael Ymer	Markus Eriksson; Jonathan Mridha	Hugo Dellien; Neil Pauffley; Henrik Sillanpää; Richard Gabb
May 4	Thailand F3 Futures; Bangkok, Thailand; Hard $10,000	Jacob Grills; 1–6, 6–3, 6–4	Karunuday Singh	Puriwat Chatpatcharoen; Phassawit Burapharitta	Kento Takeuchi; Finn Tearney; Akira Santillan; Tyler Hochwalt
May 4	Thailand F3 Futures; Bangkok, Thailand; Hard $10,000	Pruchya Isaro; Nuttanon Kadchapanan; 6–4, 6–4	Yuichi Ito; Sho Katayama	Puriwat Chatpatcharoen; Phassawit Burapharitta	Kento Takeuchi; Finn Tearney; Akira Santillan; Tyler Hochwalt
May 4	Turkey F18 Futures; Antalya, Turkey; Hard $10,000	Riccardo Bellotti; 6–3, 6–4	Lucas Miedler	Altuğ Çelikbilek; Peter Heller	Clément Geens; Maximilian Neuchrist; Anıl Yüksel; Barkın Yalçınkale
May 4	Turkey F18 Futures; Antalya, Turkey; Hard $10,000	Lucas Miedler; Maximilian Neuchrist; 6–2, 6–3	Benjamin Bonzi; Fabien Reboul	Altuğ Çelikbilek; Peter Heller	Clément Geens; Maximilian Neuchrist; Anıl Yüksel; Barkın Yalçınkale
May 4	United States F15 Futures; Orange Park, United States; Clay $10,000	Darian King; 6–2, 3–6, 6–0	Stefan Kozlov	Sekou Bangoura; Maximiliano Estévez	Tennys Sandgren; Wil Spencer; Juan Rocha; Julio Peralta
May 4	United States F15 Futures; Orange Park, United States; Clay $10,000	Jean-Yves Aubone; Ben McLachlan; 6–4, 6–4	Maximiliano Estévez; Facundo Mena	Sekou Bangoura; Maximiliano Estévez	Tennys Sandgren; Wil Spencer; Juan Rocha; Julio Peralta
May 11
May 11	Mexico F3 Futures; Mexico City, Mexico; Hard $15,000	Iván Endara; 6–1, 7–6^{(7–3)}	Stefan Kozlov	Mauricio Echazú; Luis David Martínez	Adam El Mihdawy; Manuel Sánchez; Carlos Ramírez Utermann; Deiton Baughman
May 11	Mexico F3 Futures; Mexico City, Mexico; Hard $15,000	Mauricio Echazú; Jorge Brian Panta; 6–4, 6–3	Mauricio Astorga; Alberto Rojas-Maldonado	Mauricio Echazú; Luis David Martínez	Adam El Mihdawy; Manuel Sánchez; Carlos Ramírez Utermann; Deiton Baughman
May 11	Algeria F2 Futures; Algiers, Algeria; Clay $10,000	David Pérez Sanz; 3–6, 6–1, 6–2	Corentin Denolly	Alexis Musialek; Rafael Camilo	André Gaspar Murta; Abdelhak Hameurlaine; Medy Chettar; Sadio Doumbia
May 11	Algeria F2 Futures; Algiers, Algeria; Clay $10,000	David Pérez Sanz; Mark Vervoort; 6–4, 6–4	Rafael Camilo; Adria Mas Mascolo	Alexis Musialek; Rafael Camilo	André Gaspar Murta; Abdelhak Hameurlaine; Medy Chettar; Sadio Doumbia
May 11	Argentina F5 Futures; Córdoba, Argentina; Clay $10,000	Nicolás Kicker; 6–2, 6–0	Nicolás Alberto Arreche	Federico Coria; Francisco Bahamonde	Hernán Casanova; Juan Ignacio Galarza; Gonzalo Villanueva; Ricardo Urzua-Rivera
May 11	Argentina F5 Futures; Córdoba, Argentina; Clay $10,000	Nicolás Kicker; Matías Zukas; 6–0, 6–3	Juan Pablo Paz; Mauricio Pérez Mota	Federico Coria; Francisco Bahamonde	Hernán Casanova; Juan Ignacio Galarza; Gonzalo Villanueva; Ricardo Urzua-Rivera
May 11	Bosnia & Herzegovina F1 Futures; Doboj, Bosnia & Herzegovina; Clay $10,000	Pascal Meis; 6–4, 3–6, 6–3	Viktor Durasovic	Luca Pancaldi; Joško Topić	Fabio Mercuri; Danylo Kalenichenko; Nino Serdarušić; Goran Marković
May 11	Bosnia & Herzegovina F1 Futures; Doboj, Bosnia & Herzegovina; Clay $10,000	Nino Serdarušić; Joško Topić; 2–6, 6–4, [12–10]	Danylo Kalenichenko; Juraj Masár	Luca Pancaldi; Joško Topić	Fabio Mercuri; Danylo Kalenichenko; Nino Serdarušić; Goran Marković
May 11	Colombia F1 Futures; Pereira, Colombia; Clay $10,000	Emilio Gómez; 7–5, 6–2	João Menezes	Wilson Leite; Caio Zampieri	Fernando Romboli; Guillermo Rivera Aránguiz; Facundo Mena; Marcelo Zormann
May 11	Colombia F1 Futures; Pereira, Colombia; Clay $10,000	João Menezes; João Walendowsky; 6–3, 5–7, [11–9]	Felipe Escobar; Juan Sebastián Gómez	Wilson Leite; Caio Zampieri	Fernando Romboli; Guillermo Rivera Aránguiz; Facundo Mena; Marcelo Zormann
May 11	Croatia F9 Futures; Bol, Croatia; Clay $10,000	Miljan Zekić; 6–7^{(4–7)}, 7–5, 6–2	Yannick Mertens	Gavin van Peperzeel; Kevin Krawietz	Toni Androić; Tomislav Ternar; Markos Kalovelonis; Tomislav Brkić
May 11	Croatia F9 Futures; Bol, Croatia; Clay $10,000	Gábor Borsos; Levente Gödry; 6–4, 7–5	Martin Beran; Markos Kalovelonis	Gavin van Peperzeel; Kevin Krawietz	Toni Androić; Tomislav Ternar; Markos Kalovelonis; Tomislav Brkić
May 11	Czech Republic F1 Futures; Prague, Czech Republic; Clay $10,000	Uladzimir Ignatik; 6–1, 6–3	Jan Mertl	Václav Šafránek; Peter Torebko	Dominik Süč; Marek Michalička; Piotr Łomacki; Fabrício Neis
May 11	Czech Republic F1 Futures; Prague, Czech Republic; Clay $10,000	František Čermák; Robin Staněk; 6–3, 6–3	Kamil Gajewski; Szymon Walków	Václav Šafránek; Peter Torebko	Dominik Süč; Marek Michalička; Piotr Łomacki; Fabrício Neis
May 11	Egypt F18 Futures; Sharm El Sheikh, Egypt; Clay $10,000	Petros Chrysochos; 3–6, 6–0, 6–2	Pablo Vivero González	Karim-Mohamed Maamoun; Lloyd Harris	Cem İlkel; Daniel Evans; Barış Ergüden; Issam Haitham Taweel
May 11	Egypt F18 Futures; Sharm El Sheikh, Egypt; Clay $10,000	Ryan Agar; Joe Salisbury; 6–2, 6–1	Javier Pulgar-García; Pablo Vivero González	Karim-Mohamed Maamoun; Lloyd Harris	Cem İlkel; Daniel Evans; Barış Ergüden; Issam Haitham Taweel
May 11	Georgia F1 Futures; Pantiani, Georgia; Clay $10,000	Grzegorz Panfil; 3–6, 6–2, 6–4	Alexandr Igoshin	Paweł Ciaś; Pedro Sakamoto	Benjamin Balleret; Artur Dubinski; Anton Galkin; Dimitriy Voronin
May 11	Georgia F1 Futures; Pantiani, Georgia; Clay $10,000	Cancelled due to rain		Paweł Ciaś; Pedro Sakamoto	Benjamin Balleret; Artur Dubinski; Anton Galkin; Dimitriy Voronin
May 11	Israel F6 Futures; Akko, Israel; Hard $10,000	Edan Leshem; 6–4, 6–2	Peter Kobelt	Evan Song; Evgeny Karlovskiy	Daniel Cukierman; Bar Tzuf Botzer; Toby Martin; Daniel Tamir
May 11	Israel F6 Futures; Akko, Israel; Hard $10,000	Sam Barry; Toby Martin; 6–3, 7–5	Dekel Bar; Daniel Cukierman	Evan Song; Evgeny Karlovskiy	Daniel Cukierman; Bar Tzuf Botzer; Toby Martin; Daniel Tamir
May 11	Italy F9 Futures; Santa Margherita di Pula, Italy; Clay $10,000	Calvin Hemery; 7–6^{(7–5)}, 6–0	Johan Sébastien Tatlot	Francesco Borgo; Gianluca Naso	Enzo Couacaud; Samuel Bensoussan; Enrico Burzi; Matteo Berrettini
May 11	Italy F9 Futures; Santa Margherita di Pula, Italy; Clay $10,000	Pietro Licciardi; Pietro Rondoni; 3–6, 6–4, [10–7]	Filippo Baldi; Matteo Berrettini	Francesco Borgo; Gianluca Naso	Enzo Couacaud; Samuel Bensoussan; Enrico Burzi; Matteo Berrettini
May 11	Portugal F5 Futures; Coimbra, Portugal; Clay $10,000	Georgi Rumenov Payakov; 6–0, 6–4	Ricardo Ojeda Lara	João Domingues; Bruno Sant'Anna	David Vega Hernández; Carlos Boluda-Purkiss; Iván Arenas-Gualda; Jorge Hernando-Ruano
May 11	Portugal F5 Futures; Coimbra, Portugal; Clay $10,000	Iván Arenas-Gualda; Georgi Rumenov Payakov; 6–2, 6–3	Miguel Deus; Nuno Deus	João Domingues; Bruno Sant'Anna	David Vega Hernández; Carlos Boluda-Purkiss; Iván Arenas-Gualda; Jorge Hernando-Ruano
May 11	Romania F2 Futures; Galați, Romania; Clay $10,000	Maxim Dubarenco; 7–6^{(7–5)}, 6–3	Dmitry Popko	Vasile Antonescu; Dragoș Dima	Victor Crivoi; Richard Waite; Teodor-Dacian Crăciun; Jan Blecha
May 11	Romania F2 Futures; Galați, Romania; Clay $10,000	Petru-Alexandru Luncanu; Lukas Mugevičius; 7–5, 6–4	Victor Vlad Cornea; Luca Margaroli	Vasile Antonescu; Dragoș Dima	Victor Crivoi; Richard Waite; Teodor-Dacian Crăciun; Jan Blecha
May 11	Spain F13 Futures; Valldoreix, Spain; Clay $10,000	Tommy Paul; 2–6, 6–4, 6–4	Albert Alcaraz Ivorra	Taylor Harry Fritz; Oriol Roca Batalla	Jordi Samper Montaña; Pol Toledo Bagué; Juan-Samuel Arauzo-Martínez; Pedro Martínez
May 11	Spain F13 Futures; Valldoreix, Spain; Clay $10,000	Gerard Granollers; Oriol Roca Batalla; 7–5, 6–2	Sergio Martos Gornés; Pol Toledo Bagué	Taylor Harry Fritz; Oriol Roca Batalla	Jordi Samper Montaña; Pol Toledo Bagué; Juan-Samuel Arauzo-Martínez; Pedro Martínez
May 11	Sweden F3 Futures; Båstad, Sweden; Clay $10,000	Mikael Ymer; 2–6, 6–1, 6–2	Dragoș Nicolae Mădăraș	Henrik Sillanpää; Hubert Hurkacz	Federico Zeballos; Fred Simonsson; Markus Eriksson; Richard Gabb
May 11	Sweden F3 Futures; Båstad, Sweden; Clay $10,000	Jonathan Mridha; Fred Simonsson; 7–6^{(7–4)}, 6–2	Serdar Bojadjieva; Dragoș Nicolae Mădăraș	Henrik Sillanpää; Hubert Hurkacz	Federico Zeballos; Fred Simonsson; Markus Eriksson; Richard Gabb
May 11	Turkey F19 Futures; Antalya, Turkey; Hard $10,000	Riccardo Bellotti; 6–1, 6–1	Erik Crepaldi	Chen Ti; Dimitar Kuzmanov	Francesco Vilardo; Fedor Chervyakov; Harry Bourchier; Hugo Grenier
May 11	Turkey F19 Futures; Antalya, Turkey; Hard $10,000	Erik Crepaldi; Hugo Grenier; 6–4, 6–3	Chen Ti; Francesco Vilardo	Chen Ti; Dimitar Kuzmanov	Francesco Vilardo; Fedor Chervyakov; Harry Bourchier; Hugo Grenier
May 11	Ukraine F1 Futures; Cherkasy, Ukraine; Clay $10,000	Volodymyr Uzhylovskyi; 4–6, 6–1, 6–4	Vladyslav Manafov	Marat Deviatiarov; Dmytro Kamynin	Ivan Nedelko; Roman Khassanov; Artem Smirnov; Oleg Khotkov
May 11	Ukraine F1 Futures; Cherkasy, Ukraine; Clay $10,000	Sergiy Sergiienko; Artem Smirnov; 3–6, 6–4, [10–7]	Vasko Mladenov; Vadym Ursu	Marat Deviatiarov; Dmytro Kamynin	Ivan Nedelko; Roman Khassanov; Artem Smirnov; Oleg Khotkov
May 11	United States F16 Futures; Tampa, USA; Clay $10,000	Thales Turini; 6–2, 7–5	Tennys Sandgren	Wil Spencer; Jesse Witten	Mico Santiago; Ryan Haviland; Dominic Cotrone; Rhyne Williams
May 11	United States F16 Futures; Tampa, USA; Clay $10,000	Brandon Anandan; Sekou Bangoura; 7–6^{(7–4)}, 7–6^{(7–4)}	Jean-Yves Aubone; Rhyne Williams	Wil Spencer; Jesse Witten	Mico Santiago; Ryan Haviland; Dominic Cotrone; Rhyne Williams
May 18
May 18	Korea F1 Futures; Daegu, Korea; Hard $15,000	Daniel Nguyen; 3–6, 6–4, 6–3	Ilya Ivashka	Blake Mott; Cho Min-hyeok	Kwon Soon-woo; Jose Rubin Statham; Nam Ji-sung; Hiroyasu Ehara
May 18	Korea F1 Futures; Daegu, Korea; Hard $15,000	Hong Seong-chan; Lee Hyung-taik; 6–3, 6–3	Nam Ji-sung; Song Min-kyu	Blake Mott; Cho Min-hyeok	Kwon Soon-woo; Jose Rubin Statham; Nam Ji-sung; Hiroyasu Ehara
May 18	Mexico F4 Futures; Córdoba, Mexico; Hard $15,000	Darian King; 7–5, 5–7, 6–4	Ernesto Escobedo	Stefan Kozlov; Iván Endara	Nikita Kryvonos; Jarryd Chaplin; Daniel Garza; Adam El Mihdawy
May 18	Mexico F4 Futures; Córdoba, Mexico; Hard $15,000	Keith-Patrick Crowley; Hans Hach; 6–4, 6–3	Iván Endara; Luis David Martínez	Stefan Kozlov; Iván Endara	Nikita Kryvonos; Jarryd Chaplin; Daniel Garza; Adam El Mihdawy
May 18	Algeria F3 Futures; Annaba, Algeria; Clay $10,000	Sadio Doumbia; 6–3, 6–2	David Pérez Sanz	Florent Diep; Mario Vilella Martínez	Fabien Reboul; André Gaspar Murta; Adria Mas Mascolo; Rafael Camilo
May 18	Algeria F3 Futures; Annaba, Algeria; Clay $10,000	Sadio Doumbia; Fabien Reboul; 6–3, 7–6^{(7–5)}	Rafael Camilo; Adria Mas Mascolo	Florent Diep; Mario Vilella Martínez	Fabien Reboul; André Gaspar Murta; Adria Mas Mascolo; Rafael Camilo
May 18	Argentina F6 Futures; Villa del Dique, Argentina; Clay $10,000	Juan Ignacio Galarza; 6–4, 6–2	Federico Coria	Franco Emanuel Egea; Gustavo Vellbach	Nicolás Kicker; Alan Kohen; Juan Ignacio Ameal; Agustin Savarino
May 18	Argentina F6 Futures; Villa del Dique, Argentina; Clay $10,000	Hernán Casanova; Eduardo Agustin Torre; 6–7^{(8–6)}, 7–6^{(7–3)}, [10–7]	Juan Ignacio Galarza; Mariano Kestelboim	Franco Emanuel Egea; Gustavo Vellbach	Nicolás Kicker; Alan Kohen; Juan Ignacio Ameal; Agustin Savarino
May 18	Bosnia & Herzegovina F2 Futures; Prijedor, Bosnia & Herzegovina; Clay $10,000	Franko Škugor; 6–4, 7–6^{(7–4)}	Tomislav Ternar	Boris Čonkić; Luka Ilić	Duje Kekez; Juraj Masár; Michal Schmid; Julien Cagnina
May 18	Bosnia & Herzegovina F2 Futures; Prijedor, Bosnia & Herzegovina; Clay $10,000	Ivan Sabanov; Matej Sabanov; Walkover	Danylo Kalenichenko; Juraj Masár	Boris Čonkić; Luka Ilić	Duje Kekez; Juraj Masár; Michal Schmid; Julien Cagnina
May 18	China F5 Futures; Wuhan, China; Hard $10,000	Wu Di; 3–6, 6–4, 7–6^{(7–3)}	Li Zhe	Michael Geerts; Ning Yuqing	Huang Liang-chi; Lee Duck-hee; Gao Xin; Qi Xi
May 18	China F5 Futures; Wuhan, China; Hard $10,000	Huang Liang-chi; Yi Chu-huan; 4–6, 6–1, [11–9]	Bai Yan; Arata Onozawa	Michael Geerts; Ning Yuqing	Huang Liang-chi; Lee Duck-hee; Gao Xin; Qi Xi
May 18	Colombia F2 Futures; Pereira, Colombia; Clay $10,000	Carlos Salamanca; 6–3, 7–5	Tiago Lopes	Facundo Mena; Ricardo Hocevar	Daniel Elahi Galán; João Menezes; Caio Zampieri; Alejandro Gómez
May 18	Colombia F2 Futures; Pereira, Colombia; Clay $10,000	Wilson Leite; João Pedro Sorgi; 1–6, 6–1, [10–8]	Fernando Romboli; Caio Zampieri	Facundo Mena; Ricardo Hocevar	Daniel Elahi Galán; João Menezes; Caio Zampieri; Alejandro Gómez
May 18	Croatia F10 Futures; Bol, Croatia; Clay $10,000	Toni Androić; 4–6, 6–3, 6–3	Oscar Otte	Gavin van Peperzeel; Daniel Masur	Pietro Licciardi; Stefan Micov; Mike Urbanija; Patricio Heras
May 18	Croatia F10 Futures; Bol, Croatia; Clay $10,000	Eduardo Dischinger; Fabrício Neis; 6–4, 7–5	Maverick Banes; Gavin van Peperzeel	Gavin van Peperzeel; Daniel Masur	Pietro Licciardi; Stefan Micov; Mike Urbanija; Patricio Heras
May 18	Czech Republic F2 Futures; Jablonec nad Nisou, Czech Republic; Clay $10,000	Marek Michalička; 7–6^{(7–4)}, 7–5	Uladzimir Ignatik	Robin Staněk; Václav Šafránek	Pavel Nejedlý; Libor Salaba; Jan Šátral; Jan Choinski
May 18	Czech Republic F2 Futures; Jablonec nad Nisou, Czech Republic; Clay $10,000	Mateusz Kowalczyk; Adam Majchrowicz; 6–3, 7–5	Daniel Altmaier; Paul Wörner	Robin Staněk; Václav Šafránek	Pavel Nejedlý; Libor Salaba; Jan Šátral; Jan Choinski
May 18	Egypt F19 Futures; Sharm El Sheikh, Egypt; Hard $10,000	Pablo Vivero González; 3–6, 7–6^{(7–3)}, 6–1	Karim-Mohamed Maamoun	Petros Chrysochos; Joe Salisbury	Seydou Diallo; Javier Pulgar-García; Mick Lescure; Lloyd Harris
May 18	Egypt F19 Futures; Sharm El Sheikh, Egypt; Hard $10,000	Daniel Smethurst; Marcus Willis; 6–4, 6–4	Karim-Mohamed Maamoun; Issam Haitham Taweel	Petros Chrysochos; Joe Salisbury	Seydou Diallo; Javier Pulgar-García; Mick Lescure; Lloyd Harris
May 18	Georgia F2 Futures; Pantiani, Georgia; Clay $10,000	Grzegorz Panfil; 7–6^{(7–5)}, 7–5	Pedro Sakamoto	Marco Bortolotti; Benjamin Balleret	Giorgi Javakhishvili; Thiago Monteiro; Ilya Lebedev; Lennert van der Linden
May 18	Georgia F2 Futures; Pantiani, Georgia; Clay $10,000	Benjamin Balleret; Marco Bortolotti; 7–6^{(7–5)}, 7–5	Paweł Ciaś; Grzegorz Panfil	Marco Bortolotti; Benjamin Balleret	Giorgi Javakhishvili; Thiago Monteiro; Ilya Lebedev; Lennert van der Linden
May 18	India F5 Futures; Mandya, India; Hard $10,000	Karunuday Singh; 3–0, ret.	Antoine Escoffier	Vishnu Vardhan; Ronit Singh Bisht	Hung Jui-chen; Sasikumar Mukund; Vinayak Sharma Kaza; Sidharth Rawat
May 18	India F5 Futures; Mandya, India; Hard $10,000	Anvit Bendre; Akash Wagh; 2–6, 6–4, [10–6]	Hung Jui-chen; Sasikumar Mukund	Vishnu Vardhan; Ronit Singh Bisht	Hung Jui-chen; Sasikumar Mukund; Vinayak Sharma Kaza; Sidharth Rawat
May 18	Italy F10 Futures; Bergamo, Italy; Clay $10,000	Matteo Trevisan; 6–4, 6–4	Federico Gaio	Omar Giacalone; José Pereira	Nils Langer; Gianluca Naso; Stefano Travaglia; Alessandro Bega
May 18	Italy F10 Futures; Bergamo, Italy; Clay $10,000	Riccardo Bonadio; Pietro Rondoni; 6–4, 6–3	Gonçalo Oliveira; Alexandre Sidorenko	Omar Giacalone; José Pereira	Nils Langer; Gianluca Naso; Stefano Travaglia; Alessandro Bega
May 18	Portugal F6 Futures; Pombal, Portugal; Hard $10,000	Georgi Rumenov Payakov; 6–2, 7–5	Carlos Boluda-Purkiss	Roberto Ortega Olmedo; Takanyi Garanganga	João Domingues; Iván Arenas-Gualda; Ricardo Ojeda Lara; Frederico Gil
May 18	Portugal F6 Futures; Pombal, Portugal; Hard $10,000	Nuno Deus; João Domingues; 6–2, 6–4	Gonçalo Falcao; Bruno Sant'Anna	Roberto Ortega Olmedo; Takanyi Garanganga	João Domingues; Iván Arenas-Gualda; Ricardo Ojeda Lara; Frederico Gil
May 18	Romania F3 Futures; Bucharest, Romania; Clay $10,000	Dmitry Popko; 6–4, 7–6^{(7–1)}	Victor Crivoi	Claudio Fortuna; Luca George Tatomir	Juan Carlos Sáez; Alexandar Lazov; Dragoș Dima; Teodor-Dacian Crăciun
May 18	Romania F3 Futures; Bucharest, Romania; Clay $10,000	Victor-Mugurel Anagnastopol; Petru-Alexandru Luncanu; 7–6^{(7–4)}, 7–5	Kirill Dmitriev; Richard Waite	Claudio Fortuna; Luca George Tatomir	Juan Carlos Sáez; Alexandar Lazov; Dragoș Dima; Teodor-Dacian Crăciun
May 18	Spain F14 Futures; Vic, Spain; Clay $10,000	Maxime Chazal; 6–7^{(7–9)}, 7–6^{(7–4)}, 6–2	Alexander Ward	Alex Rybakov; Tommy Paul	Alexis Musialek; Maxime Tabatruong; Albert Alcaraz Ivorra; Gerard Granollers
May 18	Spain F14 Futures; Vic, Spain; Clay $10,000	Sergio Martos Gornés; Pol Toledo Bagué; 3–6, 7–6^{(7–4)}, [17–15]	David Pel; Maxime Tabatruong	Alex Rybakov; Tommy Paul	Alexis Musialek; Maxime Tabatruong; Albert Alcaraz Ivorra; Gerard Granollers
May 18	Turkey F20 Futures; Antalya, Turkey; Hard $10,000	Erik Crepaldi; 6–3, 6–4	Daniel Cox	Lorenzo Frigerio; Federico Zeballos	Dekel Bar; David Rice; Francesco Vilardo; Nicolas Rosenzweig
May 18	Turkey F20 Futures; Antalya, Turkey; Hard $10,000	Julius Tverijonas; Federico Zeballos; 6–3, 6–3	Constantin Belot; Nicolas Rosenzweig	Lorenzo Frigerio; Federico Zeballos	Dekel Bar; David Rice; Francesco Vilardo; Nicolas Rosenzweig
May 18	Ukraine F2 Futures; Cherkasy, Ukraine; Clay $10,000	Volodymyr Uzhylovskyi; 6–0, 6–1	Artem Smirnov	Tak Khunn Wang; Vadim Alekseenko	Ivan Nedelko; Maxime Janvier; Dmytro Kamynin; Yanaïs Laurent
May 18	Ukraine F2 Futures; Cherkasy, Ukraine; Clay $10,000	Marat Deviatiarov; Maxime Janvier; 6–2, 6–2	Vladyslav Manafov; Volodymyr Uzhylovskyi	Tak Khunn Wang; Vadim Alekseenko	Ivan Nedelko; Maxime Janvier; Dmytro Kamynin; Yanaïs Laurent
May 25
May 25	Argentina F7 Futures; Villa Allende, Argentina; Clay $15,000+H	Nicolás Kicker; 6–1, 6–2	Tomás Lipovšek Puches	Federico Coria; Gonzalo Villanueva	André Miele; Juan Pablo Paz; Hernán Casanova; Ricardo Urzua-Rivera
May 25	Argentina F7 Futures; Villa Allende, Argentina; Clay $15,000+H	André Miele; Alexandre Tsuchiya; 4–6, 6–2, [10–6]	Juan Ignacio Galarza; Nicolás Kicker	Federico Coria; Gonzalo Villanueva	André Miele; Juan Pablo Paz; Hernán Casanova; Ricardo Urzua-Rivera
May 25	China F6 Futures; Wuhan, China; Hard $15,000	Li Zhe; 6–4, 6–3	Bai Yan	Lee Duck-hee; Gao Xin	Huang Liang-chi; Kento Takeuchi; Wu Di; Ning Yuqing
May 25	China F6 Futures; Wuhan, China; Hard $15,000	Gao Xin; Li Zhe; 7–5, 6–3	Bai Yan; Arata Onozawa	Lee Duck-hee; Gao Xin	Huang Liang-chi; Kento Takeuchi; Wu Di; Ning Yuqing
May 25	Korea F2 Futures; Changwon, Korea; Hard $15,000	Omar Jasika; 6–3, 6–4	Connor Smith	Cho Min-hyeok; Nam Ji-sung	Na Jung-woong; Lee Jea-moon; Kwon Soon-woo; Fritz Wolmarans
May 25	Korea F2 Futures; Changwon, Korea; Hard $15,000	Nam Ji-sung; Song Min-kyu; 6–2, 5–7, [10–6]	Choi Jae-won; Kim Hyun-joon	Cho Min-hyeok; Nam Ji-sung	Na Jung-woong; Lee Jea-moon; Kwon Soon-woo; Fritz Wolmarans
May 25	Romania F4 Futures; Bacău, Romania; Clay $15,000+H	Kamil Majchrzak; 6–1, 6–2	Dragoș Dima	Yannik Reuter; Jordan Thompson	Michael Mmoh; Juan Carlos Sáez; Maxim Dubarenco; Jordi Samper Montaña
May 25	Romania F4 Futures; Bacău, Romania; Clay $15,000+H	Hans Podlipnik; Juan Carlos Sáez; 6–3, 4–6, [10–7]	Alexandru-Daniel Carpen; Ilija Vučić	Yannik Reuter; Jordan Thompson	Michael Mmoh; Juan Carlos Sáez; Maxim Dubarenco; Jordi Samper Montaña
May 25	Russia F1 Futures; Moscow, Russia; Clay $15,000	Daniil Medvedev; 6–4, 6–1	Ivan Gakhov	Jérôme Inzerillo; Evgeny Elistratov	Anton Zaitcev; Philipp Davydenko; Alexey Vatutin; Evgeny Karlovskiy
May 25	Russia F1 Futures; Moscow, Russia; Clay $15,000	Jérôme Inzerillo; Vladimir Ivanov; 3–6, 7–6^{(9–7)}, [10–7]	Andrei Levine; Anton Zaitcev	Jérôme Inzerillo; Evgeny Elistratov	Anton Zaitcev; Philipp Davydenko; Alexey Vatutin; Evgeny Karlovskiy
May 25	Bosnia & Herzegovina F3 Futures; Brčko, Bosnia & Herzegovina; Clay $10,000	Tom Kočevar-Dešman; 6–1, 6–2	Tomislav Jotovski	Tomislav Brkić; Tobias Simon	Petar Trendafilov; Nico Matic; Martin Blaško; Dejan Katić
May 25	Bosnia & Herzegovina F3 Futures; Brčko, Bosnia & Herzegovina; Clay $10,000	Victor Vlad Cornea; Tudor Cristian Sulea; 6–2, 6–4	Ivan Sabanov; Matej Sabanov	Tomislav Brkić; Tobias Simon	Petar Trendafilov; Nico Matic; Martin Blaško; Dejan Katić
May 25	Colombia F3 Futures; Pereira, Colombia; Clay $10,000	Wilson Leite; 2–6, 7–6^{(13–11)}, 6–3	Facundo Mena	Caio Zampieri; Ricardo Hocevar	José Olivares; Juan Sebastián Gómez; Tiago Lopes; Emilio Gómez
May 25	Colombia F3 Futures; Pereira, Colombia; Clay $10,000	Wilson Leite; João Pedro Sorgi; 6–4, 6–4	Felipe Mantilla; Juan Montes	Caio Zampieri; Ricardo Hocevar	José Olivares; Juan Sebastián Gómez; Tiago Lopes; Emilio Gómez
May 25	Croatia F3 Futures; Bol, Croatia; Clay $10,000	Duje Kekez; 6–1, 6–2	Maverick Banes	Markus Eriksson; Patrik Rosenholm	Fred Simonsson; Daniel Masur; Neil Pauffley; Oscar Otte
May 25	Croatia F3 Futures; Bol, Croatia; Clay $10,000	Eduardo Dischinger; Fabrício Neis; 6–2, 7–5	Maverick Banes; Gavin van Peperzeel	Markus Eriksson; Patrik Rosenholm	Fred Simonsson; Daniel Masur; Neil Pauffley; Oscar Otte
May 25	Czech Republic F3 Futures; Most, Czech Republic; Clay $10,000	Jan Šátral; 6–4, 6–2	Adrian Sikora	Jan Choinski; Uladzimir Ignatik	Zdeněk Kolář; Marek Michalička; Václav Šafránek; Robin Staněk
May 25	Czech Republic F3 Futures; Most, Czech Republic; Clay $10,000	Roman Jebavý; Jan Šátral; 6–4, 4–6, [10–5]	Uladzimir Ignatik; Dominik Kellovský	Jan Choinski; Uladzimir Ignatik	Zdeněk Kolář; Marek Michalička; Václav Šafránek; Robin Staněk
May 25	Egypt F20 Futures; Sharm El Sheikh, Egypt; Hard $10,000	Marcus Willis; 7–5, 6–7^{(8–10)}, 7–5	Julien Dubail	Mick Lescure; Daniel Smethurst	Giacomo Miccini; Issam Haitham Taweel; Tobias-Maximilian Dankl; Tommaso Lago
May 25	Egypt F20 Futures; Sharm El Sheikh, Egypt; Hard $10,000	Daniel Smethurst; Marcus Willis; 6–1, 6–3	Karim Hossam; Issam Haitham Taweel	Mick Lescure; Daniel Smethurst	Giacomo Miccini; Issam Haitham Taweel; Tobias-Maximilian Dankl; Tommaso Lago
May 25	Georgia F3 Futures; Pantiani, Georgia; Clay $10,000	Grzegorz Panfil; 6–1, 7–6^{(7–0)}	Victor Baluda	Thiago Monteiro; Michael Linzer	Aleksandre Metreveli; Pedro Sakamoto; George Tsivadze; Marco Bortolotti
May 25	Georgia F3 Futures; Pantiani, Georgia; Clay $10,000	Marco Bortolotti; Thiago Monteiro; 7–6^{(9–7)}, 7–5	Victor Baluda; Ivan Kalinin	Thiago Monteiro; Michael Linzer	Aleksandre Metreveli; Pedro Sakamoto; George Tsivadze; Marco Bortolotti
May 25	Guam F1 Futures; Tumon, Guam; Hard $10,000	Takao Suzuki; 6–3, 6–3	Gengo Kikuchi	Ko Suzuki; Katsuki Nagao	Kelsey Stevenson; Sho Katayama; Hiromasa Oku; Brendon Moore
May 25	Guam F1 Futures; Tumon, Guam; Hard $10,000	Yuichi Ito; Jeevan Nedunchezhiyan; 2–6, 6–3, [10–7]	Masakatsu Noguchi; Masaki Sasai	Ko Suzuki; Katsuki Nagao	Kelsey Stevenson; Sho Katayama; Hiromasa Oku; Brendon Moore
May 25	India F6 Futures; Mysore, India; Hard $10,000+H	Ramkumar Ramanathan; 7–6^{(7–2)}, 3–6, 6–3	Vishnu Vardhan	Ranjeet Virali-Murugesan; Karunuday Singh	Vinayak Sharma Kaza; Mohit Mayur Jayaprakash; Sasikumar Mukund; Hung Jui-chen
May 25	India F6 Futures; Mysore, India; Hard $10,000+H	Mohit Mayur Jayaprakash; Vinayak Sharma Kaza; 6–4, 6–2	Bhavesh Gour; Sidharth Rawat	Ranjeet Virali-Murugesan; Karunuday Singh	Vinayak Sharma Kaza; Mohit Mayur Jayaprakash; Sasikumar Mukund; Hung Jui-chen
May 25	Italy F11 Futures; Lecco, Italy; Clay $10,000	Tommy Paul; 6–1, 6–4	Lorenzo Sonego	Nils Langer; Andrés Molteni	Matteo Trevisan; Mateo Nicolás Martínez; Omar Giacalone; Gianluca Mager
May 25	Italy F11 Futures; Lecco, Italy; Clay $10,000	Peter Luczak; Marc Polmans; 6–4, 6–2	David Pel; Maxime Tabatruong	Nils Langer; Andrés Molteni	Matteo Trevisan; Mateo Nicolás Martínez; Omar Giacalone; Gianluca Mager
May 25	Portugal F7 Futures; Idanha-a-Nova, Portugal; Hard $10,000	Frederico Ferreira Silva; 6–4, 6–2	João Domingues	Sébastien Boltz; Roberto Ortega Olmedo	Sami Reinwein; Romain Barbosa; Carlos Boluda-Purkiss; Vasco Mensurado
May 25	Portugal F7 Futures; Idanha-a-Nova, Portugal; Hard $10,000	Nuno Deus; João Domingues; 7–5, 5–7, [10–7]	Carlos Boluda-Purkiss; Roberto Ortega Olmedo	Sébastien Boltz; Roberto Ortega Olmedo	Sami Reinwein; Romain Barbosa; Carlos Boluda-Purkiss; Vasco Mensurado
May 25	Spain F15 Futures; Santa Margarida de Montbui, Spain; Hard $10,000	Gerard Granollers; 6–7^{(1–7)}, 7–6^{(7–4)}, 6–3	Yasutaka Uchiyama	José Checa Calvo; Sergio Martos Gornés	Matteo Fago; Pol Toledo Bagué; Rafael Camilo; Mark Vervoort
May 25	Spain F15 Futures; Santa Margarida de Montbui, Spain; Hard $10,000	Juan-Samuel Arauzo-Martínez; Ricardo Villacorta-Alonso; 6–4, 6–7^{(5–7)}, [10–6]	Sergio Martos Gornés; Pol Toledo Bagué	José Checa Calvo; Sergio Martos Gornés	Matteo Fago; Pol Toledo Bagué; Rafael Camilo; Mark Vervoort
May 25	Turkey F21 Futures; Antalya, Turkey; Hard $10,000	Ricardo Rodríguez; 7–5, 4–6, 6–4	Sandro Ehrat	Bastian Trinker; Tucker Vorster	Baptiste Crepatte; Arthur Surreaux; Ruan Roelofse; Christopher Heyman
May 25	Turkey F21 Futures; Antalya, Turkey; Hard $10,000	Ricardo Rodríguez; Ruan Roelofse; 6–2, 6–2	Altuğ Çelikbilek; Sefa Suluoğlu	Bastian Trinker; Tucker Vorster	Baptiste Crepatte; Arthur Surreaux; Ruan Roelofse; Christopher Heyman
May 25	Ukraine F3 Futures; Cherkasy, Ukraine; Clay $10,000	Artem Smirnov; 6–1, 2–6, 6–1	Ivan Nedelko	Constant Lestienne; Maxime Janvier	Tak Khunn Wang; Dmytro Badanov; Marat Deviatiarov; Volodymyr Uzhylovskyi
May 25	Ukraine F3 Futures; Cherkasy, Ukraine; Clay $10,000	Bogdan Didenko; Levar Harper-Griffith; 6–4, 6–2	Marat Deviatiarov; Volodymyr Uzhylovskyi	Constant Lestienne; Maxime Janvier	Tak Khunn Wang; Dmytro Badanov; Marat Deviatiarov; Volodymyr Uzhylovskyi

=== June ===
Week of	Tournament	Winner	Runners-up	Semifinalists	Quarterfinalists
June 1	China F7 Futures; Wuhan, China; Hard $15,000	Huang Liang-chi; 3–6, 6–3, 6–4	Wu Di	Bai Yan; Marcos Giraldi Requena	Michael Geerts; Zheng Weiqiang; Ouyang Bowen; Wang Aoran
June 1	China F7 Futures; Wuhan, China; Hard $15,000	Bai Yan; Li Yifeng; 6–3, 2–6, [17–15]	Gao Xin; Michael Geerts	Bai Yan; Marcos Giraldi Requena	Michael Geerts; Zheng Weiqiang; Ouyang Bowen; Wang Aoran
June 1	Lebanon F1 Futures; Jounieh, Lebanon; Clay $15,000	Peđa Krstin; 6–2, 6–3	Adrian Sikora	Sam Barry; Henrik Sillanpää	Francesco Garzelli; Luca Margaroli; Kareem Al Allaf; Sasha Merzetti
June 1	Lebanon F1 Futures; Jounieh, Lebanon; Clay $15,000	Matteo Marfia; Luca Margaroli; 6–4, 6–2	Milos Sekulic; Henrik Sillanpää	Sam Barry; Henrik Sillanpää	Francesco Garzelli; Luca Margaroli; Kareem Al Allaf; Sasha Merzetti
June 1	United States F16A Futures; Winston-Salem, United States; Hard $15,000	Matija Pecotić; 6–2, 6–3	Tennys Sandgren	Mico Santiago; Raymond Sarmiento	Ernesto Escobedo; Sekou Bangoura; Rhyne Williams; Kevin King
June 1	United States F16A Futures; Winston-Salem, United States; Hard $15,000	Julio Peralta; Matt Seeberger; 3–6, 6–3, [10–8]	Tennys Sandgren; Rhyne Williams	Mico Santiago; Raymond Sarmiento	Ernesto Escobedo; Sekou Bangoura; Rhyne Williams; Kevin King
June 1	Uzbekistan F3 Futures; Andijan, Uzbekistan; Hard $15,000	Denys Molchanov; 2–6, 7–6^{(7–2)}, 6–4	Nikola Milojević	Karim-Mohamed Maamoun; Sanjar Fayziev	Daniiar Duldaev; Denis Matsukevich; Wang Chuhan; Temur Ismailov
June 1	Uzbekistan F3 Futures; Andijan, Uzbekistan; Hard $15,000	Denis Matsukevich; Denys Molchanov; 3–6, 7–6^{(7–5)}, [14–12]	Markos Kalovelonis; Shonigmatjon Shofayziyev	Karim-Mohamed Maamoun; Sanjar Fayziev	Daniiar Duldaev; Denis Matsukevich; Wang Chuhan; Temur Ismailov
June 1	Bosnia & Herzegovina F4 Futures; Kiseljak, Bosnia & Herzegovina; Clay $10,000	Pavel Nejedlý; 7–6^{(7–5)}, 2–6, 6–4	Victor Vlad Cornea	Franjo Raspudić; Tomislav Jotovski	Danilo Petrović; Elmar Ejupovic; Steven de Waard; Tom Kočevar-Dešman
June 1	Bosnia & Herzegovina F4 Futures; Kiseljak, Bosnia & Herzegovina; Clay $10,000	Danilo Petrović; Ilija Vučić; 6–0, 6–2	Steven de Waard; Jérôme Inzerillo	Franjo Raspudić; Tomislav Jotovski	Danilo Petrović; Elmar Ejupovic; Steven de Waard; Tom Kočevar-Dešman
June 1	Croatia F12 Futures; Bol, Croatia; Clay $10,000	Michael Linzer; 6–2, 3–6, 6–1	Maverick Banes	Miljan Zekić; Sandro Ehrat	Markus Eriksson; Christian Samuelsson; Leonardo Kirche; Gavin van Peperzeel
June 1	Croatia F12 Futures; Bol, Croatia; Clay $10,000	Maverick Banes; Gavin van Peperzeel; Walkover	Jonathan Mridha; Fred Simonsson	Miljan Zekić; Sandro Ehrat	Markus Eriksson; Christian Samuelsson; Leonardo Kirche; Gavin van Peperzeel
June 1	Egypt F21 Futures; Sharm El Sheikh, Egypt; Hard $10,000	Hugo Nys; 6–3, 6–1	Javier Pulgar-García	Jaime Pulgar-García; Julien Dubail	Giacomo Miccini; Karim Hossam; Jacob Adaktusson; Francesco Vilardo
June 1	Egypt F21 Futures; Sharm El Sheikh, Egypt; Hard $10,000	Juan Matías González Carrasco; Emiliano Franco Vecchia; 7–6^{(7–4)}, 5–7, [10–5]	Hugo Nys; Jaime Pulgar-García	Jaime Pulgar-García; Julien Dubail	Giacomo Miccini; Karim Hossam; Jacob Adaktusson; Francesco Vilardo
June 1	Georgia F4 Futures; Pantiani, Georgia; Clay $10,000	Aleksandre Metreveli; 6–3, 6–2	Marco Bortolotti	Victor Baluda; Paweł Ciaś	Stijn Meulemans; Karol Drzewiecki; Gabriel Petit; Pedro Sakamoto
June 1	Georgia F4 Futures; Pantiani, Georgia; Clay $10,000	Victor Baluda; Ivan Kalinin; 7–5, 6–1	Giorgi Javakhishvili; Aleksandre Metreveli	Victor Baluda; Paweł Ciaś	Stijn Meulemans; Karol Drzewiecki; Gabriel Petit; Pedro Sakamoto
June 1	India F7 Futures; Jassowal, India; Hard $10,000	Sasikumar Mukund; 6–4, 6–3	Sidharth Rawat	Vinayak Sharma Kaza; Mohit Mayur Jayaprakash	Lakshit Sood; Jajbir Saran; Ronit Singh Bisht; Chandril Sood
June 1	India F7 Futures; Jassowal, India; Hard $10,000	Chandril Sood; Lakshit Sood; 6–1, 6–4	Mohit Mayur Jayaprakash; Vinayak Sharma Kaza	Vinayak Sharma Kaza; Mohit Mayur Jayaprakash	Lakshit Sood; Jajbir Saran; Ronit Singh Bisht; Chandril Sood
June 1	Israel F7 Futures; Ramat Gan, Israel; Hard $10,000	Amir Weintraub; 6–1, 6–3	Maxime Janvier	Bar Tzuf Botzer; Ben Patael	Peter Kobelt; Tal Goldengoren; Toby Martin; Cameron Silverman
June 1	Israel F7 Futures; Ramat Gan, Israel; Hard $10,000	Joshua Paris; Ben Patael; 6–4, 5–7, [10–6]	Matan Shay Ganzi; Peter Kobelt	Bar Tzuf Botzer; Ben Patael	Peter Kobelt; Tal Goldengoren; Toby Martin; Cameron Silverman
June 1	Italy F12 Futures; Lodi, Italy; Clay $10,000+H	Alessandro Giannessi; 6–7^{(6–8)}, 7–5, 6–4	Yann Marti	Johan Sébastien Tatlot; Grégoire Barrère	Julien Cagnina; Riccardo Ghedin; Takanyi Garanganga; Daniele Giorgini
June 1	Italy F12 Futures; Lodi, Italy; Clay $10,000+H	Daniele Giorgini; Matteo Volante; 7–6^{(7–4)}, 3–6, [10–2]	Francesco Borgo; Riccardo Ghedin	Johan Sébastien Tatlot; Grégoire Barrère	Julien Cagnina; Riccardo Ghedin; Takanyi Garanganga; Daniele Giorgini
June 1	Japan F5 Futures; Karuizawa, Japan; Clay $10,000	Takashi Saito; 6–3, 6–1	Hiromasa Oku	Thomas Fancutt; Makoto Ochi	Shunrou Takeshima; Keisuke Watanuki; Yuichi Ito; Akihiro Tanaka
June 1	Japan F5 Futures; Karuizawa, Japan; Clay $10,000	Ben McLachlan; Keisuke Watanuki; 6–1, 3–6, [10–3]	Sho Katayama; Arata Onozawa	Thomas Fancutt; Makoto Ochi	Shunrou Takeshima; Keisuke Watanuki; Yuichi Ito; Akihiro Tanaka
June 1	Mexico F5 Futures; Manzanillo, Mexico; Hard $10,000	Andre Dome; 6–3, 6–7^{(7–9)}, 7–5	Tigre Hank	Jorge Panta; Luis Patiño	Luis David Martínez; Lucas Gómez; Daniel Garza; Iván Endara
June 1	Mexico F5 Futures; Manzanillo, Mexico; Hard $10,000	Iván Endara; Tigre Hank; 6–4, 6–4	Luis David Martínez; Luis Patiño	Jorge Panta; Luis Patiño	Luis David Martínez; Lucas Gómez; Daniel Garza; Iván Endara
June 1	Mozambique F1 Futures; Maputo, Mozambique; Hard $10,000	Benjamin Lock; 6–4, 6–4	William Bushamuka	Matías Franco Descotte; Hassan Ndayishimiye	Frederico Ferreira Silva; Vullnet Tashi; Jeremy Beale; Nicolaas Scholtz
June 1	Mozambique F1 Futures; Maputo, Mozambique; Hard $10,000	Duncan Mugabe; Hassan Ndayishimiye; 6–3, 6–4	Nicolaas Scholtz; Evan Song	Matías Franco Descotte; Hassan Ndayishimiye	Frederico Ferreira Silva; Vullnet Tashi; Jeremy Beale; Nicolaas Scholtz
June 1	Portugal F8 Futures; Idanha-a-Nova, Portugal; Hard $10,000	Sébastien Boltz; 6–2, 6–0	João Domingues	Alexandre Folie; Benjamin Bonzi	Romain Barbosa; Jose-Ricardo Nunes; Peter Bothwell; Ricardo Ojeda Lara
June 1	Portugal F8 Futures; Idanha-a-Nova, Portugal; Hard $10,000	Nuno Deus; João Domingues; 3–6, 6–0, [10–3]	Romain Barbosa; Alexandre Folie	Alexandre Folie; Benjamin Bonzi	Romain Barbosa; Jose-Ricardo Nunes; Peter Bothwell; Ricardo Ojeda Lara
June 1	Russia F2 Futures; Kazan, Russia; Clay $10,000	Vladimir Ivanov; 4–6, 6–4, 6–1	Ivan Nedelko	Philipp Davydenko; Ilya Lebedev	Richard Muzaev; Evgeny Elistratov; Boris Pokotilov; Alexandr Igoshin
June 1	Russia F2 Futures; Kazan, Russia; Clay $10,000	Alexandr Igoshin; Yan Sabanin; 7–5, 6–2	Anton Galkin; Ilya Lebedev	Philipp Davydenko; Ilya Lebedev	Richard Muzaev; Evgeny Elistratov; Boris Pokotilov; Alexandr Igoshin
June 1	Slovenia F1 Futures; Maribor, Slovenia; Clay $10,000	Kirill Dmitriev; 6–4, 6–1	Lucas Miedler	Filippo Leonardi; Patrick Ofner	Dušan Lojda; Pirmin Hänle; Gibril Diarra; Pascal Brunner
June 1	Slovenia F1 Futures; Maribor, Slovenia; Clay $10,000	Danylo Kalenichenko; Gonçalo Oliveira; 6–4, 7–6^{(7–3)}	Rok Jarc; Mike Urbanija	Filippo Leonardi; Patrick Ofner	Dušan Lojda; Pirmin Hänle; Gibril Diarra; Pascal Brunner
June 1	Spain F16 Futures; Madrid, Spain; Clay $10,000	Maxime Chazal; 7–6^{(7–4)}, 6–4	Albert Alcaraz Ivorra	Carlos Taberner; Jean-Marc Werner	Roberto Ortega Olmedo; Georgi Rumenov Payakov; Claudio Fortuna; Pedro Martínez
June 1	Spain F16 Futures; Madrid, Spain; Clay $10,000	Juan-Samuel Arauzo-Martínez; Iván Arenas-Gualda; 7–6^{(9–7)}, 6–0	Eduard Esteve Lobato; Sergio Martos Gornés	Carlos Taberner; Jean-Marc Werner	Roberto Ortega Olmedo; Georgi Rumenov Payakov; Claudio Fortuna; Pedro Martínez
June 1	Turkey F22 Futures; Bursa, Turkey; Hard $10,000	Alessandro Bega; 6–3, 6–0	Denys Mylokostov	Barış Ergüden; Altuğ Çelikbilek	Sarp Ağabigün; Anıl Yüksel; Davide Melchiorre; Cem İlkel
June 1	Turkey F22 Futures; Bursa, Turkey; Hard $10,000	Alessandro Bega; Davide Melchiorre; 4–6, 7–5, [10–3]	Altuğ Çelikbilek; Sefa Suluoğlu	Barış Ergüden; Altuğ Çelikbilek	Sarp Ağabigün; Anıl Yüksel; Davide Melchiorre; Cem İlkel
June 8	Bosnia & Herzegovina F5 Futures; Sarajevo, Bosnia & Herzegovina; Clay $15,000	Deiton Baughman; 7–5, 2–6, 6–4	Duje Kekez	Nils Langer; Franko Škugor	Kevin Krawietz; Nino Serdarušić; Miki Janković; Jérôme Inzerillo
June 8	Bosnia & Herzegovina F5 Futures; Sarajevo, Bosnia & Herzegovina; Clay $15,000	Kevin Krawietz; Nils Langer; 6–4, 6–4	Darko Jandrić; Miki Janković	Nils Langer; Franko Škugor	Kevin Krawietz; Nino Serdarušić; Miki Janković; Jérôme Inzerillo
June 8	Lebanon F2 Futures; Jounieh, Lebanon; Clay $15,000	Jordi Samper Montaña; 4–6, 6–3, 6–3	Ivo Klec	Matteo Marfia; Peđa Krstin	Francesco Garzelli; Adrian Sikora; Frederick Saba; Vladimir Filip
June 8	Lebanon F2 Futures; Jounieh, Lebanon; Clay $15,000	Ivo Klec; Adrian Sikora; 6–4, 6–7^{(5–7)}, [10–6]	Mohammad Al-Ghareeb; Abdullah Maqdes	Matteo Marfia; Peđa Krstin	Francesco Garzelli; Adrian Sikora; Frederick Saba; Vladimir Filip
June 8	United States F16B Futures; Charlottesville, United States; Hard $15,000	Tennys Sandgren; 6–4, 6–4	Ernesto Escobedo	Collin Altamirano; Ryan Haviland	Sekou Bangoura; Rhyne Williams; Sanam Singh; Hans Hach Verdugo
June 8	United States F16B Futures; Charlottesville, United States; Hard $15,000	Hunter Nicholas; Finn Tearney; 6–3, 6–2	Gonzales Austin; Max Schnur	Collin Altamirano; Ryan Haviland	Sekou Bangoura; Rhyne Williams; Sanam Singh; Hans Hach Verdugo
June 8	Uzbekistan F4 Futures; Namangan, Uzbekistan; Hard $15,000	Temur Ismailov; 6–1, 7–5	Wang Chuhan	Denys Molchanov; Marko Tepavac	Markos Kalovelonis; Sanjar Fayziev; Ruan Roelofse; Nikola Milojević
June 8	Uzbekistan F4 Futures; Namangan, Uzbekistan; Hard $15,000	Dean O'Brien; Ruan Roelofse; 7–5, 6–4	Sanjar Fayziev; Jurabek Karimov	Denys Molchanov; Marko Tepavac	Markos Kalovelonis; Sanjar Fayziev; Ruan Roelofse; Nikola Milojević
June 8	Belgium F1 Futures; Binche, Belgium; Clay $10,000	Oscar Otte; 7–5, 6–1	Juan Lizariturry	Julien Cagnina; Alexandre Folie	Mick Lescure; Antoine Hoang; Romain Barbosa; Maxime Tabatruong
June 8	Belgium F1 Futures; Binche, Belgium; Clay $10,000	Marvin Greven; Robert Willekes MacDonald; Walkover	Sam Barry; Mick Lescure	Julien Cagnina; Alexandre Folie	Mick Lescure; Antoine Hoang; Romain Barbosa; Maxime Tabatruong
June 8	Brazil F1 Futures; Itajaí, Brazil; Clay $10,000	Caio Zampieri; 7–6^{(7–3)}, 5–7, 7–6^{(7–4)}	Daniel Dutra da Silva	Fernando Romboli; Marcelo Zormann	Alexandre Tsuchiya; Hernán Casanova; Tiago Lopes; André Miele
June 8	Brazil F1 Futures; Itajaí, Brazil; Clay $10,000	Daniel Dutra da Silva; Bruno Sant'Anna; 6–4, 3–6, [10–7]	Fernando Romboli; Caio Zampieri	Fernando Romboli; Marcelo Zormann	Alexandre Tsuchiya; Hernán Casanova; Tiago Lopes; André Miele
June 8	Bulgaria F1 Futures; Stara Zagora, Bulgaria; Clay $10,000	Oriol Roca Batalla; 3–6, 6–4, 6–2	Alexandar Lazov	Albert Alcaraz Ivorra; Pirmin Hänle	Michal Schmid; Petru-Alexandru Luncanu; Eduard Esteve Lobato; Dimitar Kuzmanov
June 8	Bulgaria F1 Futures; Stara Zagora, Bulgaria; Clay $10,000	Eduard Esteve Lobato; Oriol Roca Batalla; 6–3, 5–7, [10–8]	Alexandru-Daniel Carpen; Petru-Alexandru Luncanu	Albert Alcaraz Ivorra; Pirmin Hänle	Michal Schmid; Petru-Alexandru Luncanu; Eduard Esteve Lobato; Dimitar Kuzmanov
June 8	Croatia F13 Futures; Bol, Croatia; Clay $10,000	Michael Linzer; 6–7^{(3–7)}, 6–3, 6–3	Gavin van Peperzeel	Markus Eriksson; Leandro Portmann	Eduardo Dischinger; Isak Arvidsson; Marin Bradarić; Daniel Windahl
June 8	Croatia F13 Futures; Bol, Croatia; Clay $10,000	Isak Arvidsson; Christian Samuelsson; 6–7^{(1–7)}, 6–3, [10–5]	Marin Bradarić; Tomislav Draganja	Markus Eriksson; Leandro Portmann	Eduardo Dischinger; Isak Arvidsson; Marin Bradarić; Daniel Windahl
June 8	Egypt F22 Futures; Sharm El Sheikh, Egypt; Hard $10,000	Mohamed Safwat; 6–3, 6–2	David Pérez Sanz	Alexander Jhun; Javier Pulgar-García	Jacob Adaktusson; Hugo Schott; Karim Hossam; Issam Haitham Taweel
June 8	Egypt F22 Futures; Sharm El Sheikh, Egypt; Hard $10,000	David Pérez Sanz; Jaime Pulgar-García; 3–6, 6–2, [10–6]	Karim Hossam; Issam Haitham Taweel	Alexander Jhun; Javier Pulgar-García	Jacob Adaktusson; Hugo Schott; Karim Hossam; Issam Haitham Taweel
June 8	Georgia F5 Futures; Pantiani, Georgia; Clay $10,000	Marco Bortolotti; 7–5, 7–5	Caio Silva	George Tsivadze; Marek Řeháček	Victor Baluda; Gleb Alekseenko; Giorgi Javakhishvili; Aleksandre Bakshi
June 8	Georgia F5 Futures; Pantiani, Georgia; Clay $10,000	Marco Bortolotti; Francesco Moncagatto; 6–3, 6–2	Karol Drzewiecki; Jan Zieliński	George Tsivadze; Marek Řeháček	Victor Baluda; Gleb Alekseenko; Giorgi Javakhishvili; Aleksandre Bakshi
June 8	Hong Kong F1 Futures; Hong Kong, China; Hard $10,000	Chen Ti; 4–1, ret.	Alexander Sarkissian	Wang Chieh-fu; Yu Cheng-yu	Liu Shao-fan; He Yecong; Qi Xi; Hsieh Cheng-peng
June 8	Hong Kong F1 Futures; Hong Kong, China; Hard $10,000	Hsieh Cheng-peng; Yeung Pak-long; 4–6, 6–4, [10–5]	He Yecong; Yi Chu-huan	Wang Chieh-fu; Yu Cheng-yu	Liu Shao-fan; He Yecong; Qi Xi; Hsieh Cheng-peng
June 8	Israel F8 Futures; Ramat Gan, Israel; Hard $10,000	Sébastien Boltz; 6–3, 2–6, 6–3	Amir Weintraub	Matthieu Roy; Tom Jomby	Joshua Paris; Daniel Cukierman; Bar Tzuf Botzer; Toby Martin
June 8	Israel F8 Futures; Ramat Gan, Israel; Hard $10,000	Cameron Silverman; Raleigh Smith; 6–4, 5–7, [10–8]	Sébastien Boltz; Tom Jomby	Matthieu Roy; Tom Jomby	Joshua Paris; Daniel Cukierman; Bar Tzuf Botzer; Toby Martin
June 8	Italy F13 Futures; Bergamo, Italy; Clay $10,000	Gianluca Naso; 4–6, 6–2, 7–6^{(7–3)}	Alessandro Giannessi	Christian Trubrig; Johan Sébastien Tatlot	Claudio Fortuna; Matteo Trevisan; Davide Della Tommasina; Takanyi Garanganga
June 8	Italy F13 Futures; Bergamo, Italy; Clay $10,000	Gianluca Naso; Giacomo Oradini; 6–3, 3–6, [10–2]	Claudio Fortuna; Riccardo Maiga	Christian Trubrig; Johan Sébastien Tatlot	Claudio Fortuna; Matteo Trevisan; Davide Della Tommasina; Takanyi Garanganga
June 8	Japan F6 Futures; Kashiwa, Japan; Hard $10,000	Lee Duck-hee; 6–4, 6–2	Toshihide Matsui	Takuto Niki; Takashi Saito	Masaki Sasai; Yuya Kibi; Kento Takeuchi; Yusuke Takahashi
June 8	Japan F6 Futures; Kashiwa, Japan; Hard $10,000	Yuya Kibi; Takuto Niki; 6–0, 6–3	Lee Duck-hee; Woo Chung-hyo	Takuto Niki; Takashi Saito	Masaki Sasai; Yuya Kibi; Kento Takeuchi; Yusuke Takahashi
June 8	Mexico F6 Futures; Manzanillo, Mexico; Hard $10,000	Tigre Hank; 4–6, 6–4, 7–5	Christopher Díaz Figueroa	Adam El Mihdawy; Andre Dome	Alejandro Gómez; Daniel Garza; Daniel Elahi Galán; Jorge Panta
June 8	Mexico F6 Futures; Manzanillo, Mexico; Hard $10,000	Luis David Martínez; Luis Patiño; Walkover	Jean-Yves Aubone; Andre Dome	Adam El Mihdawy; Andre Dome	Alejandro Gómez; Daniel Garza; Daniel Elahi Galán; Jorge Panta
June 8	Mozambique F2 Futures; Maputo, Mozambique; Hard $10,000	Lloyd Harris; 6–2, 6–1	Jeremy Beale	Frederico Ferreira Silva; Nicolaas Scholtz	Matías Franco Descotte; Evan Song; Benjamin Lock; Hassan Ndayishimiye
June 8	Mozambique F2 Futures; Maputo, Mozambique; Hard $10,000	Evan King; Anderson Reed; 6–3, 6–2	Duncan Mugabe; Hassan Ndayishimiye	Frederico Ferreira Silva; Nicolaas Scholtz	Matías Franco Descotte; Evan Song; Benjamin Lock; Hassan Ndayishimiye
June 8	Russia F3 Futures; Kazan, Russia; Clay $10,000	Vladyslav Manafov; 6–1, 6–2	Evgeny Elistratov	Artem Dubrivnyy; Vladimir Ivanov	Vadim Alekseenko; Alexander Perfilov; Andrey Saveliev; Ivan Nedelko
June 8	Russia F3 Futures; Kazan, Russia; Clay $10,000	Mikhail Fufygin; Andrei Levine; 7–6^{(7–3)}, 6–3	Vladyslav Manafov; Mark Vervoort	Artem Dubrivnyy; Vladimir Ivanov	Vadim Alekseenko; Alexander Perfilov; Andrey Saveliev; Ivan Nedelko
June 8	Serbia F1 Futures; Belgrade, Serbia; Clay $10,000	Dmitry Popko; 6–3, 6–4	Adrian Partl	Nico Matic; Pascal Meis	Grégoire Barrère; Florent Diep; Denis Bejtulahi; Aleksandar Vukic
June 8	Serbia F1 Futures; Belgrade, Serbia; Clay $10,000	Kirill Dmitriev; Dmitry Popko; 6–2, 3–6, [10–6]	Denis Bejtulahi; Viktor Filipenkó	Nico Matic; Pascal Meis	Grégoire Barrère; Florent Diep; Denis Bejtulahi; Aleksandar Vukic
June 8	Slovenia F2 Futures; Ljubljana, Slovenia; Clay $10,000	Edoardo Eremin; 6–3, 6–2	Pascal Brunner	Patrick Ofner; Maximilian Neuchrist	Peter Heller; Jacob Grills; Tom Kočevar-Dešman; Jordan Ubiergo
June 8	Slovenia F2 Futures; Ljubljana, Slovenia; Clay $10,000	Danylo Kalenichenko; Gonçalo Oliveira; 7–5, 7–6^{(7–3)}	Lucas Miedler; Maximilian Neuchrist	Patrick Ofner; Maximilian Neuchrist	Peter Heller; Jacob Grills; Tom Kočevar-Dešman; Jordan Ubiergo
June 8	Turkey F23 Futures; Bursa, Turkey; Hard $10,000	Yannick Jankovits; 7–5, 6–3	Roberto Cid Subervi	Julien Dubail; Alessandro Bega	Barkın Yalçınkale; Aaron Cortes Alcaraz; Bradley Mousley; Cem İlkel
June 8	Turkey F23 Futures; Bursa, Turkey; Hard $10,000	Julien Dubail; Yannick Jankovits; 6–2, 6–2	Tuna Altuna; Bradley Mousley	Julien Dubail; Alessandro Bega	Barkın Yalçınkale; Aaron Cortes Alcaraz; Bradley Mousley; Cem İlkel
June 15	Italy F14 Futures; Naples, Italy; Clay $15,000	Daniele Giorgini; 6–2, 6–3	Viktor Galović	Gianluigi Quinzi; Omar Giacalone	Constant Lestienne; Christian Trubrig; Mateo Nicolás Martínez; Gavin van Peperzeel
June 15	Italy F14 Futures; Naples, Italy; Clay $15,000	Gerard Granollers; Mark Vervoort; 6–4, 7–5	Filippo Baldi; Eduard Esteve Lobato	Gianluigi Quinzi; Omar Giacalone	Constant Lestienne; Christian Trubrig; Mateo Nicolás Martínez; Gavin van Peperzeel
June 15	Netherlands F1 Futures; Alkmaar, Netherlands; Clay $15,000	José Pereira; 6–1, 6–2	Jean-Marc Werner	Jorge Aguilar; Greg Ouellette	Alexey Vatutin; Nicolas Reissig; Botic van de Zandschulp; Julien Cagnina
June 15	Netherlands F1 Futures; Alkmaar, Netherlands; Clay $15,000	Sam Barry; Romano Frantzen; 7–5, 4–6, [10–8]	Sander Groen; Nicolas Reissig	Jorge Aguilar; Greg Ouellette	Alexey Vatutin; Nicolas Reissig; Botic van de Zandschulp; Julien Cagnina
June 15	Russia F4 Futures; Kazan, Russia; Clay $15,000	Maxim Dubarenco; 6–0, 6–1	Anton Desyatnik	Evgeny Elistratov; Alexander Perfilov	Ivan Gakhov; Vladyslav Manafov; Volodymyr Uzhylovskyi; Aleksandr Vasilenko
June 15	Russia F4 Futures; Kazan, Russia; Clay $15,000	Maxim Dubarenco; Vladyslav Manafov; 6–3, 4–6, [10–6]	Daniil Medvedev; Volodymyr Uzhylovskyi	Evgeny Elistratov; Alexander Perfilov	Ivan Gakhov; Vladyslav Manafov; Volodymyr Uzhylovskyi; Aleksandr Vasilenko
June 15	Thailand F4 Futures; Bangkok, Thailand; Hard $15,000	Shuichi Sekiguchi; 6–1, 6–2	Kento Takeuchi	Na Jung-woong; Toshihide Matsui	Hiroki Kondo; Pruchya Isaro; Akira Santillan; Christopher Rungkat
June 15	Thailand F4 Futures; Bangkok, Thailand; Hard $15,000	Toshihide Matsui; Christopher Rungkat; 4–6, 6–3, [10–2]	Sanchai Ratiwatana; Sonchat Ratiwatana	Na Jung-woong; Toshihide Matsui	Hiroki Kondo; Pruchya Isaro; Akira Santillan; Christopher Rungkat
June 15	Belgium F2 Futures; Damme, Belgium; Clay $10,000	Oscar Otte; 7–5, 6–3	Tom Schonenberg	Clément Geens; Marvin Netuschil	Jules Okala; Ugo Nastasi; Tallon Griekspoor; Antoine Hoang
June 15	Belgium F2 Futures; Damme, Belgium; Clay $10,000	Sander Gillé; Joran Vliegen; 6–2, 6–3	Antoine Hoang; Ugo Nastasi	Clément Geens; Marvin Netuschil	Jules Okala; Ugo Nastasi; Tallon Griekspoor; Antoine Hoang
June 15	Brazil F2 Futures; Itajaí, Brazil; Clay $10,000	Caio Zampieri; 6–2, 6–4	Thales Turini	Marcelo Zormann; Tiago Lopes	Igor Marcondes; Oscar José Gutiérrez; João Menezes; Hernán Casanova
June 15	Brazil F2 Futures; Itajaí, Brazil; Clay $10,000	Rafael Matos; Marcelo Zormann; 6–7^{(5–7)}, 6–2, [10–8]	Igor Marcondes; Felipe Meligeni Alves	Marcelo Zormann; Tiago Lopes	Igor Marcondes; Oscar José Gutiérrez; João Menezes; Hernán Casanova
June 15	Bulgaria F2 Futures; Burgas, Bulgaria; Clay $10,000	Yasutaka Uchiyama; 5–7, 6–4, 6–2	Dimitar Kuzmanov	Petru-Alexandru Luncanu; Alexandar Lazov	Gleb Alekseenko; Diego-José Manrique-Velázquez; Ljubomir Čelebić; Jonathan Kanar
June 15	Bulgaria F2 Futures; Burgas, Bulgaria; Clay $10,000	Tihomir Grozdanov; Alexandar Lazov; 7–5, 4–6, [10–7]	Gabriel Donev; Eleftherios Theodoro	Petru-Alexandru Luncanu; Alexandar Lazov	Gleb Alekseenko; Diego-José Manrique-Velázquez; Ljubomir Čelebić; Jonathan Kanar
June 15	Egypt F23 Futures; Sharm El Sheikh, Egypt; Hard $10,000	David Pérez Sanz; 7–5, 3–6, 6–1	Mohamed Safwat	Petros Chrysochos; Karim-Mohamed Maamoun	Federico Maccari; Issam Haitham Taweel; André Gaspar Murta; Jacob Adaktusson
June 15	Egypt F23 Futures; Sharm El Sheikh, Egypt; Hard $10,000	Karim-Mohamed Maamoun; David Pérez Sanz; 7–5, 6–3	Mohamed Safwat; Issam Haitham Taweel	Petros Chrysochos; Karim-Mohamed Maamoun	Federico Maccari; Issam Haitham Taweel; André Gaspar Murta; Jacob Adaktusson
June 15	France F10 Futures; Mont-de-Marsan, France; Clay $10,000	Zhang Zhizhen; 6–4, 7–6^{(7–4)}	Adrien Puget	Hugo Nys; Romain Arneodo	Grégoire Jacq; Juan Lizariturry; Morgan Bourbon; Corentin Denolly
June 15	France F10 Futures; Mont-de-Marsan, France; Clay $10,000	Romain Arneodo; Hugo Nys; 6–1, 7–5	Théo Fournerie; Louis Tessa	Hugo Nys; Romain Arneodo	Grégoire Jacq; Juan Lizariturry; Morgan Bourbon; Corentin Denolly
June 15	Hong Kong F2 Futures; Hong Kong, China; Hard $10,000	Huang Liang-chi; 3–6, 6–0, 6–3	Marcos Giraldi Requena	He Yecong; Hung Jui-chen	Hsieh Cheng-peng; Chiu Yu-hsiang; Oh Seong-gook; Ho Chih-jen
June 15	Hong Kong F2 Futures; Hong Kong, China; Hard $10,000	Huang Liang-chi; Yi Chu-huan; 4–6, 7–6^{(7–2)}, [10–6]	Hung Jui-chen; Wang Chieh-fu	He Yecong; Hung Jui-chen	Hsieh Cheng-peng; Chiu Yu-hsiang; Oh Seong-gook; Ho Chih-jen
June 15	India F8 Futures; Hyderabad, India; Clay $10,000	Sumit Nagal; 6–2, 6–0	Gustavo Vellbach	Alexandre Müller; Mohit Mayur Jayaprakash	Rishab Agarwal; Niki Kaliyanda Poonacha; Vishnu Vardhan; Antoine Escoffier
June 15	India F8 Futures; Hyderabad, India; Clay $10,000	Chandril Sood; Lakshit Sood; 2–6, 6–4, [10–4]	Juan Ignacio Galarza; Alan Kohen	Alexandre Müller; Mohit Mayur Jayaprakash	Rishab Agarwal; Niki Kaliyanda Poonacha; Vishnu Vardhan; Antoine Escoffier
June 15	Israel F9 Futures; Ramat Gan, Israel; Hard $10,000	Amir Weintraub; 6–7^{(2–7)}, 6–4, 6–1	Sébastien Boltz	Edan Leshem; Tom Jomby	Daniel Cukierman; Mor Bulis; Bar Tzuf Botzer; Dekel Bar
June 15	Israel F9 Futures; Ramat Gan, Israel; Hard $10,000	Sébastien Boltz; Tom Jomby; 5–7, 6–4, [10–4]	Patrick Davidson; Keivon Tabrizi	Edan Leshem; Tom Jomby	Daniel Cukierman; Mor Bulis; Bar Tzuf Botzer; Dekel Bar
June 15	Japan F7 Futures; Akishima, Japan; Carpet $10,000	Yusuke Watanuki; 5–7, 6–4, 6–2	Hiroyasu Ehara	Jumpei Yamasaki; Moon Ju-hae	Ryota Tanuma; Arata Onozawa; Hiromasa Oku; Yuya Kibi
June 15	Japan F7 Futures; Akishima, Japan; Carpet $10,000	Yuya Kibi; Ben McLachlan; 6–3, 6–2	Arata Onozawa; Keisuke Watanuki	Jumpei Yamasaki; Moon Ju-hae	Ryota Tanuma; Arata Onozawa; Hiromasa Oku; Yuya Kibi
June 15	Mexico F7 Futures; Manzanillo, Mexico; Hard $10,000	Clay Thompson; 6–2, 6–3	Lucas Gómez	Tigre Hank; Luis David Martínez	Alberto Rojas-Maldonado; Michael Quintero; Luis Patiño; Iván Endara
June 15	Mexico F7 Futures; Manzanillo, Mexico; Hard $10,000	Mauricio Astorga; Pavel Krainik; 6–3, 7–6^{(7–4)}	Luis David Martínez; Luis Patiño	Tigre Hank; Luis David Martínez	Alberto Rojas-Maldonado; Michael Quintero; Luis Patiño; Iván Endara
June 15	Romania F5 Futures; Cluj-Napoca, Romania; Clay $10,000	Maxime Chazal; 6–2, 7–5	Teodor-Dacian Crăciun	Gábor Borsos; Dragoș Dima	Sergio Martos Gornés; Oscar Mesquida Berg; François-Arthur Vibert; Luca George Tatomir
June 15	Romania F5 Futures; Cluj-Napoca, Romania; Clay $10,000	Sergio Martos Gornés; Adria Mas Mascolo; 3–6, 6–3, [10–8]	Maxime Chazal; François-Arthur Vibert	Gábor Borsos; Dragoș Dima	Sergio Martos Gornés; Oscar Mesquida Berg; François-Arthur Vibert; Luca George Tatomir
June 15	Serbia F2 Futures; Valjevo, Serbia; Clay $10,000	Nico Matic; 6–4, 6–4	Danilo Petrović	Matej Sabanov; Dmitry Popko	Leandro Portmann; Boris Čonkić; Aleksandar Vukic; Péter Nagy
June 15	Serbia F2 Futures; Valjevo, Serbia; Clay $10,000	Danilo Petrović; Libor Salaba; 7–6^{(9–7)}, 6–4	Antoine Bellier; Aleksandar Vukic	Matej Sabanov; Dmitry Popko	Leandro Portmann; Boris Čonkić; Aleksandar Vukic; Péter Nagy
June 15	Slovenia F3 Futures; Litija, Slovenia; Clay $10,000	Pascal Brunner; 6–3, 6–2	Martin Blaško	Nicola Ghedin; Peter Heller	Marc Polmans; Patrick Ofner; Marc Sieber; Jordan Ubiergo
June 15	Slovenia F3 Futures; Litija, Slovenia; Clay $10,000	Filip Brtnický; Dominik Süč; 7–5, 2–6, [10–5]	Gonçalo Oliveira; Cristóbal Saavedra	Nicola Ghedin; Peter Heller	Marc Polmans; Patrick Ofner; Marc Sieber; Jordan Ubiergo
June 15	Spain F17 Futures; Martos, Spain; Hard $10,000	Carlos Gómez-Herrera; 6–4, 6–2	Ricardo Ojeda Lara	Matthew Short; Steven Diez	Roberto Ortega Olmedo; David Vega Hernández; Iván Arenas-Gualda; Ricardo Villacorta-Alonso
June 15	Spain F17 Futures; Martos, Spain; Hard $10,000	Juan-Samuel Arauzo-Martínez; Iván Arenas-Gualda; 6–3, 4–6, [10–8]	Alejandro Augusto Bueno; Pablo Vivero González	Matthew Short; Steven Diez	Roberto Ortega Olmedo; David Vega Hernández; Iván Arenas-Gualda; Ricardo Villacorta-Alonso
June 15	Turkey F24 Futures; Istanbul, Turkey; Hard $10,000	Mārtiņš Podžus; 6–1, 6–0	Bradley Mousley	Jaime Pulgar-García; Federico Zeballos	Aleksandre Metreveli; Caio Silva; Jānis Podžus; Cem İlkel
June 15	Turkey F24 Futures; Istanbul, Turkey; Hard $10,000	Tuna Altuna; Bradley Mousley; 7–6^{(7–1)}, 7–6^{(7–2)}	Fedor Chervyakov; Aleksandre Metreveli	Jaime Pulgar-García; Federico Zeballos	Aleksandre Metreveli; Caio Silva; Jānis Podžus; Cem İlkel
June 15	United States F17 Futures; Buffalo, United States; Clay $10,000	Kaichi Uchida; 6–4, 6–1	Maximiliano Estévez	Winston Lin; Hans Hach Verdugo	Nathan Pasha; Sekou Bangoura; Wil Spencer; Daniel Garza
June 15	United States F17 Futures; Buffalo, United States; Clay $10,000	Sekou Bangoura; Nathan Pasha; Walkover	Maximiliano Estévez; Daniel Garza	Winston Lin; Hans Hach Verdugo	Nathan Pasha; Sekou Bangoura; Wil Spencer; Daniel Garza
June 15	Zimbabwe F1 Futures; Harare, Zimbabwe; Hard $10,000	Evan King; 6–4, 7–5	Tyler Hochwalt	Evan Song; Benjamin Lock	Matías Franco Descotte; Michael Grant; Romain Bauvy; Lloyd Harris
June 15	Zimbabwe F1 Futures; Harare, Zimbabwe; Hard $10,000	Lloyd Harris; Nicolaas Scholtz; 7–5, 6–4	Evan King; Anderson Reed	Evan Song; Benjamin Lock	Matías Franco Descotte; Michael Grant; Romain Bauvy; Lloyd Harris
June 22	Canada F3 Futures; Richmond, Canada; Hard $15,000	Philip Bester; 3–6, 6–4, 7–6^{(7–4)}	Brayden Schnur	Alexios Halebian; Eric Quigley	Kaichi Uchida; Marcos Giron; Farris Fathi Gosea; Keith-Patrick Crowley
June 22	Canada F3 Futures; Richmond, Canada; Hard $15,000	Hunter Nicholas; Raymond Sarmiento; 6–3, 6–4	Marcos Giron; Farris Fathi Gosea	Alexios Halebian; Eric Quigley	Kaichi Uchida; Marcos Giron; Farris Fathi Gosea; Keith-Patrick Crowley
June 22	China F8 Futures; Zhangjiagang, China; Hard $15,000	Wu Di; 6–3, 6–7^{(2–7)}, 6–3	Li Zhe	Bai Yan; Riccardo Ghedin	Kim Young-seok; Finn Tearney; Gao Xin; He Yecong
June 22	China F8 Futures; Zhangjiagang, China; Hard $15,000	Bai Yan; Riccardo Ghedin; 6–2, 6–2	Feng He; Ning Yuqing	Bai Yan; Riccardo Ghedin	Kim Young-seok; Finn Tearney; Gao Xin; He Yecong
June 22	Czech Republic F4 Futures; Pardubice, Czech Republic; Clay $15,000	Artem Smirnov; 6–3, 6–4	Marek Michalička	Maximilian Neuchrist; Václav Šafránek	Peter Heller; Lucas Miedler; Zdeněk Kolář; Michal Schmid
June 22	Czech Republic F4 Futures; Pardubice, Czech Republic; Clay $15,000	Roman Jebavý; Jan Šátral; 6–4, 6–3	Filip Doležel; Václav Šafránek	Maximilian Neuchrist; Václav Šafránek	Peter Heller; Lucas Miedler; Zdeněk Kolář; Michal Schmid
June 22	France F11 Futures; Toulon, France; Clay $15,000	Alexis Musialek; 1–6, 6–2, 6–3	Pedro Martínez	Filip Peliwo; Constant Lestienne	David Guez; Daniil Medvedev; Romain Arneodo; Sadio Doumbia
June 22	France F11 Futures; Toulon, France; Clay $15,000	David Guez; Alexis Musialek; 6–3, 5–7, [10–5]	Julien Cagnina; Antoine Hoang	Filip Peliwo; Constant Lestienne	David Guez; Daniil Medvedev; Romain Arneodo; Sadio Doumbia
June 22	Netherlands F2 Futures; Breda, Netherlands; Clay $15,000+H	Scott Griekspoor; 6–4, 6–1	Yannik Reuter	Dennis Novak; Alexandre Sidorenko	Nicolas Reissig; Alexey Vatutin; Leonardo Kirche; Gleb Sakharov
June 22	Netherlands F2 Futures; Breda, Netherlands; Clay $15,000+H	Maverick Banes; Sam Barry; 6–3, 7–5	Sander Groen; Alexandre Sidorenko	Dennis Novak; Alexandre Sidorenko	Nicolas Reissig; Alexey Vatutin; Leonardo Kirche; Gleb Sakharov
June 22	Spain F18 Futures; Palma del Río, Spain; Hard $15,000+H	Tom Jomby; 6–2, 6–4	Roberto Ortega Olmedo	Frederico Ferreira Silva; Borja Rodriguez Manzano	Ilya Ivashka; Quino Muñoz; Ben Patael; Ricardo Villacorta-Alonso
June 22	Spain F18 Futures; Palma del Río, Spain; Hard $15,000+H	Jorge Hernando-Ruano; Ricardo Villacorta-Alonso; 7–6^{(7–5)}, 7–5	Ilya Ivashka; Tom Jomby	Frederico Ferreira Silva; Borja Rodriguez Manzano	Ilya Ivashka; Quino Muñoz; Ben Patael; Ricardo Villacorta-Alonso
June 22	Thailand F5 Futures; Bangkok, Thailand; Hard $15,000	Christopher Rungkat; 6–4, 6–3	Shuichi Sekiguchi	Kittipong Wachiramanowong; Na Jung-woong	Hiroki Kondo; Puriwat Chatpatcharoen; Karunuday Singh; Pruchya Isaro
June 22	Thailand F5 Futures; Bangkok, Thailand; Hard $15,000	Pruchya Isaro; Nuttanon Kadchapanan; 6–2, 6–0	Shuichi Sekiguchi; Karunuday Singh	Kittipong Wachiramanowong; Na Jung-woong	Hiroki Kondo; Puriwat Chatpatcharoen; Karunuday Singh; Pruchya Isaro
June 22	United States F19 Futures; Tulsa, United States; Hard $15,000	Darian King; 2–6, 7–5, 6–0	Noah Rubin	Andre Dome; Tennys Sandgren	Jean-Yves Aubone; Or Ram-Harel; Ernesto Escobedo; Spencer Papa
June 22	United States F19 Futures; Tulsa, United States; Hard $15,000	Jean-Yves Aubone; Andre Dome; 6–3, 7–6^{(8–6)}	Nick Chappell; Will E. Stein	Andre Dome; Tennys Sandgren	Jean-Yves Aubone; Or Ram-Harel; Ernesto Escobedo; Spencer Papa
June 22	Austria F1 Futures; Seefeld, Austria; Clay $10,000	Kirill Dmitriev; 7–6^{(8–6)}, 6–2	Dominik Böhler	Gavin van Peperzeel; Bastian Trinker	Pascal Brunner; Tomislav Ternar; Andrea Basso; Dmitry Popko
June 22	Austria F1 Futures; Seefeld, Austria; Clay $10,000	Andrea Basso; Luca Margaroli; 6–3, 6–3	Eduardo Dischinger; Jacob Kahoun	Gavin van Peperzeel; Bastian Trinker	Pascal Brunner; Tomislav Ternar; Andrea Basso; Dmitry Popko
June 22	Belgium F3 Futures; Havré, Belgium; Clay $10,000	Marvin Netuschil; 6–4, 6–2	Maxime Tabatruong	Omar Salman; Sandro Ehrat	Jan Choinski; Ugo Nastasi; Joran Vliegen; Julien Demois
June 22	Belgium F3 Futures; Havré, Belgium; Clay $10,000	Deiton Baughman; Fabrício Neis; 2–6, 6–4, [10–2]	Sander Gillé; Joran Vliegen	Omar Salman; Sandro Ehrat	Jan Choinski; Ugo Nastasi; Joran Vliegen; Julien Demois
June 22	Brazil F3 Futures; Itajaí, Brazil; Clay $10,000	Caio Zampieri; 6–4, 6–4	Thales Turini	Carlos Eduardo Severino; Alexandre Tsuchiya	Fernando Romboli; Bruno Sant'Anna; Nicolas Santos; Franco Emanuel Egea
June 22	Brazil F3 Futures; Itajaí, Brazil; Clay $10,000	Rafael Camilo; Bruno Sant'Anna; 6–1, 6–2	Oscar José Gutiérrez; Eduardo Agustin Torre	Carlos Eduardo Severino; Alexandre Tsuchiya	Fernando Romboli; Bruno Sant'Anna; Nicolas Santos; Franco Emanuel Egea
June 22	Bulgaria F3 Futures; Blagoevgrad, Bulgaria; Clay $10,000	Ivan Nedelko; 3–6, 6–4, 6–2	Grégoire Jacq	Petru-Alexandru Luncanu; Danail Tarpov	Alexandar Lazov; Bojan Jankulovski; Vasko Mladenov; Pirmin Hänle
June 22	Bulgaria F3 Futures; Blagoevgrad, Bulgaria; Clay $10,000	Daniel Glancy; Pirmin Hänle; 6–3, 6–2	Ioannis Stergiou; Eleftherios Theodorou	Petru-Alexandru Luncanu; Danail Tarpov	Alexandar Lazov; Bojan Jankulovski; Vasko Mladenov; Pirmin Hänle
June 22	Hong Kong F3 Futures; Hong Kong, China; Hard $10,000	Huang Liang-chi; 6–0, 6–1	Hung Jui-chen	Yi Chu-huan; Ken Onoda	Thomas Fancutt; Liu Shao-fan; Aaron Addison; Nam Hyun-woo
June 22	Hong Kong F3 Futures; Hong Kong, China; Hard $10,000	Hsieh Cheng-peng; Yi Chu-huan; 6–3, 6–7^{(6–8)}, [10–7]	Hung Jui-chen; Wang Chieh-fu	Yi Chu-huan; Ken Onoda	Thomas Fancutt; Liu Shao-fan; Aaron Addison; Nam Hyun-woo
June 22	India F9 Futures; Hyderabad, India; Hard, indoor $10,000	Antoine Escoffier; 7–6^{(7–4)}, 6–2	Vishnu Vardhan	Sasikumar Mukund; Jeevan Nedunchezhiyan	Prajnesh Gunneswaran; Hugo Grenier; Sidharth Rawat; Alan Kohen
June 22	India F9 Futures; Hyderabad, India; Hard, indoor $10,000	Sriram Balaji; Vishnu Vardhan; 6–3, 6–0	Bhavesh Gour; Sidharth Rawat	Sasikumar Mukund; Jeevan Nedunchezhiyan	Prajnesh Gunneswaran; Hugo Grenier; Sidharth Rawat; Alan Kohen
June 22	Italy F15 Futures; Basilicanova, Italy; Clay $10,000+H	Maximilian Marterer; 6–3, 6–2	Tom Kočevar-Dešman	Federico Coria; Tomás Lipovšek Puches	João Domingues; Máté Valkusz; Gerard Granollers; Viktor Galović
June 22	Italy F15 Futures; Basilicanova, Italy; Clay $10,000+H	Maximilian Marterer; Daniel Masur; 6–2, 1–6, [10–4]	Gerard Granollers; Mark Vervoort	Federico Coria; Tomás Lipovšek Puches	João Domingues; Máté Valkusz; Gerard Granollers; Viktor Galović
June 22	Japan F8 Futures; Sapporo, Japan; Clay $10,000	Yasutaka Uchiyama; 6–2, 6–3	Sho Katayama	Katsuki Nagao; Renta Tokuda	Arata Onozawa; Keisuke Watanuki; Shunrou Takeshima; Makoto Ochi
June 22	Japan F8 Futures; Sapporo, Japan; Clay $10,000	Katsuki Nagao; Hiromasa Oku; 6–2, 6–1	Shunrou Takeshima; Yusuke Watanuki	Katsuki Nagao; Renta Tokuda	Arata Onozawa; Keisuke Watanuki; Shunrou Takeshima; Makoto Ochi
June 22	Mexico F8 Futures; Manzanillo, Mexico; Hard $10,000	Daniel Elahi Galán; 6–3, 7–6^{(7–4)}	Felipe Mantilla	Christopher Díaz Figueroa; Iván Endara	Mauricio Astorga; Jorge Montero; Tigre Hank; Jorge Panta
June 22	Mexico F8 Futures; Manzanillo, Mexico; Hard $10,000	Luis David Martínez; Luis Patiño; 7–5, 6–2	John Lamble; Jody Maginley	Christopher Díaz Figueroa; Iván Endara	Mauricio Astorga; Jorge Montero; Tigre Hank; Jorge Panta
June 22	Romania F6 Futures; Sibiu, Romania; Clay $10,000	André Gaspar Murta; 1–6, 6–4, 6–4	Michael Linzer	Juan Ignacio Ameal; Alexandru Jecan	Darius Florin Brăguși; Lukas Jastraunig; Luciano Betella; Vasile Antonescu
June 22	Romania F6 Futures; Sibiu, Romania; Clay $10,000	Vasile Antonescu; Alexandru Jecan; 6–4, 6–4	Bogdan Ionuț Apostol; Luca George Tatomir	Juan Ignacio Ameal; Alexandru Jecan	Darius Florin Brăguși; Lukas Jastraunig; Luciano Betella; Vasile Antonescu
June 22	Serbia F3 Futures; Šabac, Serbia; Clay $10,000	Miljan Zekić; 2–6, 6–4, 6–1	Robin Staněk	Tak Khunn Wang; Nerman Fatić	Aleksandar Vukic; Libor Salaba; Duje Kekez; Gábor Borsos
June 22	Serbia F3 Futures; Šabac, Serbia; Clay $10,000	Tomislav Jotovski; Miljan Zekić; 6–7^{(4–7)}, 6–0, [10–4]	Florent Diep; François-Arthur Vibert	Tak Khunn Wang; Nerman Fatić	Aleksandar Vukic; Libor Salaba; Duje Kekez; Gábor Borsos
June 22	Turkey F25 Futures; Istanbul, Turkey; Hard $10,000	Maxime Janvier; 6–2, 6–4	Temur Ismailov	Hugo Nys; Cem İlkel	Lucas Catarina; Daniiar Duldaev; Mārtiņš Podžus; Aleksandre Metreveli
June 22	Turkey F25 Futures; Istanbul, Turkey; Hard $10,000	Tuna Altuna; Bradley Mousley; 6–4, 6–4	Temur Ismailov; Markos Kalovelonis	Hugo Nys; Cem İlkel	Lucas Catarina; Daniiar Duldaev; Mārtiņš Podžus; Aleksandre Metreveli
June 22	United States F18 Futures; Rochester, United States; Clay $10,000	Emilio Gómez; 7–6^{(7–3)}, 6–4	Sekou Bangoura	Alex Rybakov; Dominic Cotrone	Quinton Vega; Nathan Pasha; Michael Shabaz; Winston Lin
June 22	United States F18 Futures; Rochester, United States; Clay $10,000	Dominic Cotrone; Quinton Vega; 6–4, 6–4	Jordi Arconada; Stephen Madonia	Alex Rybakov; Dominic Cotrone	Quinton Vega; Nathan Pasha; Michael Shabaz; Winston Lin
June 22	Zimbabwe F2 Futures; Harare, Zimbabwe; Hard $10,000	Lloyd Harris; 6–1, 6–7^{(7–9)}, 6–3	Tucker Vorster	Benjamin Lock; Evan King	Matías Franco Descotte; Evan Song; Vasco Mensurado; Nicolaas Scholtz
June 22	Zimbabwe F2 Futures; Harare, Zimbabwe; Hard $10,000	Romain Bauvy; Ronan Joncour; 4–6, 7–6^{(7–5)}, [10–5]	Nicolaas Scholtz; Tucker Vorster	Benjamin Lock; Evan King	Matías Franco Descotte; Evan Song; Vasco Mensurado; Nicolaas Scholtz
June 29	Canada F4 Futures; Kelowna, Canada; Hard $15,000	Omar Jasika; 3–6, 6–4, 7–6^{(7–4)}	Eric Quigley	Marcos Giron; Hans Hach Verdugo	Brayden Schnur; Raymond Sarmiento; Fritz Wolmarans; Philip Bester
June 29	Canada F4 Futures; Kelowna, Canada; Hard $15,000	Philip Bester; Matt Seeberger; 7–6^{(8–6)}, 6–4	Hunter Nicholas; Raymond Sarmiento	Marcos Giron; Hans Hach Verdugo	Brayden Schnur; Raymond Sarmiento; Fritz Wolmarans; Philip Bester
June 29	China F9 Futures; Jinhua, China; Hard $15,000	Singles cancelled due to continuous rain, with only one semifinal completed			
June 29	China F9 Futures; Jinhua, China; Hard $15,000	Bai Yan; Riccardo Ghedin; 6–0, 6–4	Tao Junnan; Zhou Shenghao		
June 29	Colombia F4 Futures; Popayán, Colombia; Hard $15,000	Eduardo Struvay; 3–6, 7–6^{(7–5)}, 7–6^{(7–2)}	Daniel Elahi Galán	Alejandro Gómez; Juan Pablo Varillas	Juan Sebastián Gómez; Steffen Zornosa; Facundo Mena; José Olivares
June 29	Colombia F4 Futures; Popayán, Colombia; Hard $15,000	Facundo Mena; Jorge Montero; 7–6^{(7–2)}, 6–2	Manuel Sánchez; Steffen Zornosa	Alejandro Gómez; Juan Pablo Varillas	Juan Sebastián Gómez; Steffen Zornosa; Facundo Mena; José Olivares
June 29	Czech Republic F5 Futures; Ústí nad Orlicí, Czech Republic; Clay $15,000	Marek Michalička; 6–2, 6–4	Maximilian Neuchrist	Martin Blaško; Gonzalo Escobar	Artem Smirnov; Dušan Lojda; Dominik Süč; Adrian Partl
June 29	Czech Republic F5 Futures; Ústí nad Orlicí, Czech Republic; Clay $15,000	Lucas Miedler; Maximilian Neuchrist; 7–6^{(7–3)}, 6–4	Paweł Ciaś; Adam Majchrowicz	Martin Blaško; Gonzalo Escobar	Artem Smirnov; Dušan Lojda; Dominik Süč; Adrian Partl
June 29	France F12 Futures; Montauban, France; Clay $15,000+H	Gleb Sakharov; 6–4, 6–4	Maxime Teixeira	Yanaïs Laurent; Filip Peliwo	Paul Cayre; Alexis Musialek; Sadio Doumbia; Tristan Lamasine
June 29	France F12 Futures; Montauban, France; Clay $15,000+H	Tristan Lamasine; Maxime Teixeira; 6–4, 6–4	Yanaïs Laurent; Constant Lestienne	Yanaïs Laurent; Filip Peliwo	Paul Cayre; Alexis Musialek; Sadio Doumbia; Tristan Lamasine
June 29	Italy F16 Futures; Busto Arsizio, Italy; Clay $15,000	Nik Razboršek; 6–1, 6–0	Ivo Klec	Pietro Licciardi; Mateo Nicolás Martínez	Roberto Marcora; Alessandro Petrone; Tomás Lipovšek Puches; Riccardo Bonadio
June 29	Italy F16 Futures; Busto Arsizio, Italy; Clay $15,000	Francesco Borgo; Matteo Volante; 6–2, 6–1	Tomás Lipovšek Puches; Mateo Nicolás Martínez	Pietro Licciardi; Mateo Nicolás Martínez	Roberto Marcora; Alessandro Petrone; Tomás Lipovšek Puches; Riccardo Bonadio
June 29	Netherlands F3 Futures; Middelburg, Netherlands; Clay $15,000	Jesse Huta Galung; 7–5, 2–6, 6–3	Yann Marti	Maverick Banes; Fabrício Neis	Niels Desein; Vijay Sundar Prashanth; Dennis Novak; Maxime Tchoutakian
June 29	Netherlands F3 Futures; Middelburg, Netherlands; Clay $15,000	Maverick Banes; Fabrício Neis; 6–4, 6–4	Niels Lootsma; Boy Westerhof	Maverick Banes; Fabrício Neis	Niels Desein; Vijay Sundar Prashanth; Dennis Novak; Maxime Tchoutakian
June 29	Romania F7 Futures; Focșani, Romania; Clay $15,000	Laurynas Grigelis; 6–4, 6–3	Mariano Kestelboim	Vasile Antonescu; Miljan Zekić	Kamil Majchrzak; Vladyslav Manafov; Maxim Dubarenco; Guillermo Rivera Aránguiz
June 29	Romania F7 Futures; Focșani, Romania; Clay $15,000	Claudio Fortuna; Laurynas Grigelis; 6–2, 6–1	Maxim Dubarenco; Vladyslav Manafov	Vasile Antonescu; Miljan Zekić	Kamil Majchrzak; Vladyslav Manafov; Maxim Dubarenco; Guillermo Rivera Aránguiz
June 29	United States F21 Futures; Wichita, United States; Hard $15,000	Sanam Singh; 7–6^{(8–6)}, 7–6^{(7–4)}	Mitchell Krueger	Jared Hiltzik; Noah Rubin	Clay Thompson; Nicolas Meister; Tennys Sandgren; Mackenzie McDonald
June 29	United States F21 Futures; Wichita, United States; Hard $15,000	Darian King; Sanam Singh; 6–3, 6–3	Gonzales Austin; Max Schnur	Jared Hiltzik; Noah Rubin	Clay Thompson; Nicolas Meister; Tennys Sandgren; Mackenzie McDonald
June 29	Austria F2 Futures; Seefeld, Austria; Clay $10,000	Andrea Basso; 6–2, 4–6, 6–4	Dmitry Popko	Kirill Dmitriev; Lenny Hampel	Bastian Trinker; Marcin Gawron; Daniel Windahl; Isak Arvidsson
June 29	Austria F2 Futures; Seefeld, Austria; Clay $10,000	Isak Arvidsson; Daniel Windahl; 2–6, 7–5, [10–4]	Eduardo Dischinger; Caio Silva	Kirill Dmitriev; Lenny Hampel	Bastian Trinker; Marcin Gawron; Daniel Windahl; Isak Arvidsson
June 29	Belgium F4 Futures; De Haan, Belgium; Clay $10,000	Julien Cagnina; 6–4, 7–6^{(9–7)}	Maxime Tabatruong	Deiton Baughman; Sam Barry	Dayne Kelly; Gleb Alekseenko; François-Arthur Vibert; Scott Griekspoor
June 29	Belgium F4 Futures; De Haan, Belgium; Clay $10,000	Hunter Johnson; Yates Johnson; 6–4, 4–6, [10–3]	Romain Arneodo; Sam Barry	Deiton Baughman; Sam Barry	Dayne Kelly; Gleb Alekseenko; François-Arthur Vibert; Scott Griekspoor
June 29	Germany F5 Futures; Kenn, Germany; Clay $10,000	Florian Fallert; 6–3, 3–6, 6–2	Kevin Krawietz	Maximilian Marterer; Franjo Raspudić	Sandro Ehrat; Élie Rousset; Pirmin Hänle; Samuel Bensoussan
June 29	Germany F5 Futures; Kenn, Germany; Clay $10,000	Kevin Krawietz; Maximilian Marterer; 6–0, 6–1	Max Bohl; Benedikt Muller	Maximilian Marterer; Franjo Raspudić	Sandro Ehrat; Élie Rousset; Pirmin Hänle; Samuel Bensoussan
June 29	India F10 Futures; Hyderabad, India; Hard, indoor $10,000	Antoine Escoffier; 6–2, 7–6^{(7–3)}	Vishnu Vardhan	Sriram Balaji; Jeevan Nedunchezhiyan	Hugo Grenier; Ranjeet Virali-Murugesan; Sasikumar Mukund; Mohit Mayur Jayaprakash
June 29	India F10 Futures; Hyderabad, India; Hard, indoor $10,000	Sriram Balaji; Vishnu Vardhan; 6–4, 6–2	Antoine Escoffier; Hugo Grenier	Sriram Balaji; Jeevan Nedunchezhiyan	Hugo Grenier; Ranjeet Virali-Murugesan; Sasikumar Mukund; Mohit Mayur Jayaprakash
June 29	Spain F19 Futures; Bakio, Spain; Hard $10,000	Théo Fournerie; 7–5, 6–0	Juan-Samuel Arauzo-Martínez	Peter Kobelt; Steven Diez	Pol Toledo Bagué; Jorge Hernando-Ruano; Georgi Rumenov Payakov; Jaume Pla Malfeito
June 29	Spain F19 Futures; Bakio, Spain; Hard $10,000	Juan-Samuel Arauzo-Martínez; Iván Arenas-Gualda; 5–7, 7–6^{(7–3)}, [10–6]	Jorge Hernando-Ruano; Ricardo Villacorta-Alonso	Peter Kobelt; Steven Diez	Pol Toledo Bagué; Jorge Hernando-Ruano; Georgi Rumenov Payakov; Jaume Pla Malfeito
June 29	Turkey F26 Futures; Istanbul, Turkey; Hard $10,000	Aleksandre Metreveli; 6–3, 2–6, 6–2	Maxime Janvier	Anıl Yüksel; Ilya Ivashka	Jordi Vives; Roberto Cid Subervi; Yaraslav Shyla; Bar Tzuf Botzer
June 29	Turkey F26 Futures; Istanbul, Turkey; Hard $10,000	Yannick Jankovits; Hugo Nys; 2–6, 7–5, [10–6]	Sarp Ağabigün; Muhammet Haylaz	Anıl Yüksel; Ilya Ivashka	Jordi Vives; Roberto Cid Subervi; Yaraslav Shyla; Bar Tzuf Botzer
June 29	United States F20 Futures; Pittsburgh, United States; Clay $10,000	Emilio Gómez; 6–4, 6–4	Mikael Torpegaard	Alexios Halebian; Nikita Kryvonos	John McNally; Dmytro Kamynin; Dennis Uspensky; Cameron Silverman
June 29	United States F20 Futures; Pittsburgh, United States; Clay $10,000	Isade Juneau; Samuel Monette; 7–5, 7–6^{(7–4)}	Hunter Callahan; Herkko Pöllänen	Alexios Halebian; Nikita Kryvonos	John McNally; Dmytro Kamynin; Dennis Uspensky; Cameron Silverman
June 29	Zimbabwe F3 Futures; Harare, Zimbabwe; Hard $10,000	Tucker Vorster; 6–1, 3–6, 6–3	Evan King	Ronan Joncour; Nicolaas Scholtz	Michael Grant; William Bushamuka; Evan Song; Vullnet Tashi
June 29	Zimbabwe F3 Futures; Harare, Zimbabwe; Hard $10,000	Evan King; Anderson Reed; 4–6, 6–4, [10–7]	Benjamin Lock; Courtney John Lock	Ronan Joncour; Nicolaas Scholtz	Michael Grant; William Bushamuka; Evan Song; Vullnet Tashi
