= Haun =

Haun is both a surname and a given name. Notable people with the name include:

== Surname ==
- Christopher Haun (1821–1861), American potter
- Eberhard Haun (1949–1976), German footballer
- Henry P. Haun (1815–1860), American politician
- Jeremy Haun, American comics artist
- Jimmy Haun, American rock guitarist
- Lindsey Haun (born 1984), American actress and singer
- Thassilo Haun (born 1973), German former tennis player

== Given name ==
- Haun Saussy (born 1960), American professor

== See also ==
- Haun Creek, a stream in Kansas, United States
