= 2011 Bet-at-home Cup Kitzbühel – Singles =

Singles
- 2011 Bet-at-home Cup Kitzbühel

Final
- Champion: (Netherlands) Robin Haase
- Runner-up: (Spain) Albert Montañés
- Score: 6–4, 4–6, 6–1

Details
- Draw: 28
- Seeds: 8

Events
Singles	Doubles
- Bet-at-home Cup Kitzbühel

Andreas Seppi was the defending champion, but he lost in the quarterfinals to Robin Haase.
Robin Haase won the title, defeating Albert Montañés 6–4, 4–6, 6–1 in the final.

This was the first ATP tournament main draw appearance for future US Open champion and world No. 3 Dominic Thiem.

== Seeds ==
The first four seeds received a bye into the second round.

1. (Argentina) Juan Ignacio Chela (semifinals)
2. (Spain) Feliciano López (second round)
3. (Croatia) Ivan Ljubičić (withdrew)
4. (Italy) Fabio Fognini (second round)
5. (Germany) Philipp Kohlschreiber (second round)
6. (Italy) Andreas Seppi (quarterfinals)
7. (Spain) Marcel Granollers (quarterfinals)
8. (Spain) Pablo Andújar (quarterfinals)

== Draw ==
Key

- Q = Qualifier
- WC = Wild card
- LL = Lucky loser
- Alt = Alternate
- ITF = ITF entry
- PR = Protected ranking
- SR = Special ranking
- SE = Special exempt
- JE = Junior exempt
- JR = Junior Accelerator Programme entrant
- CO = College Accelerator Programme entrant
- NG = Next Gen Accelerator Program entrant
- w/o = Walkover
- r = Retired
- d = Defaulted

=== Finals ===
Semifinals
1	(Argentina) Juan Ignacio Chela	2	5
(Spain) Albert Montañés	6	7
Q	(Brazil) João Souza	1	7^{7}	4
(Netherlands) Robin Haase	6	6^{3}	6

Final
(Spain) Albert Montañés	4	6	1
(Netherlands) Robin Haase	6	4	6

=== Top half ===
First round
(Spain) D Gimeno-Traver	6	6
WC	(Austria) D Thiem	4	2
Q	(Croatia) A Veić	6^{3}	6	6
(Austria) A Haider-Maurer	7^{7}	4	2
(Italy) F Volandri	4	2
7	(Spain) M Granollers	6	6
(Colombia) S Giraldo	6	6
Q	(Germany) D Brands	3	3
(Spain) A Montañés	6	6
WC	(Spain) J Martí	3	2
WC	(Austria) T Muster	3	0
5	(Germany) P Kohlschreiber	6	6

Second round
1	(Argentina) JI Chela	6	3	6
(Spain) D Gimeno-Traver	4	6	3
Q	(Croatia) A Veić	0	6	4
7	(Spain) M Granollers	6	3	6
4	(Italy) F Fognini	3	4
(Colombia) S Giraldo	6	6
(Spain) A Montañés	6	7
5	(Germany) P Kohlschreiber	4	5

Quarterfinals
1	(Argentina) JI Chela	6	6
7	(Spain) M Granollers	3	4
(Colombia) S Giraldo	1	6^{0}
(Spain) A Montañés	6	7^{7}

Semifinals
1	(Argentina) JI Chela	2	5
(Spain) A Montañés	6	7

=== Bottom half ===
First round
8	(Spain) P Andújar	3	6	6
(Czech Republic) L Rosol	6	3	3
(Russia) I Andreev	0	7^{7}	4
(Spain) A Ramos	6	6^{3}	6
Q	(Poland) J Janowicz	3	6	6^{3}
Q	(Brazil) J Souza	6	4	7^{7}
6	(Italy) A Seppi	6	6
(Uzbekistan) D Istomin	2	2
(Spain) P Riba	7^{7}	6
(Romania) V Hănescu	6^{3}	4
(Italy) P Starace	3	0	r
(Netherlands) R Haase	6	2

Second round
8	(Spain) P Andújar	6	6
(Spain) A Ramos	2	1
Q	(Brazil) J Souza	6	6
LL	(Argentina) D Junqueira	2	2
6	(Italy) A Seppi	7	6
(Spain) P Riba	5	4
(Netherlands) R Haase	1	6	6
2	(Spain) F López	6	4	3

Quarterfinals
8	(Spain) P Andújar	3	4
Q	(Brazil) J Souza	6	6
6	(Italy) A Seppi	4	2
(Netherlands) R Haase	6	6

Semifinals
Q	(Brazil) J Souza	1	7^{7}	4
(Netherlands) R Haase	6	6^{3}	6
