= 2011 Bet-at-home Cup Kitzbühel – Singles Qualifying =

This article displays the qualifying draw of the 2011 Bet-at-home Cup Kitzbühel.

== Players ==
=== Seeds ===
1. (Argentina) Diego Junqueira (qualifying competition)
2. (Brazil) João Souza (qualified)
3. (Poland) Jerzy Janowicz (qualified)
4. (Germany) Daniel Brands (qualified)
5. (Romania) Victor Crivoi (qualifying competition)
6. (Slovakia) Andrej Martin (first round)
7. (Croatia) Antonio Veić (qualified)
8. (Slovakia) Ivo Klec (qualifying competition)

=== Qualifiers ===
1. (Croatia) Antonio Veić
2. (Brazil) João Souza
3. (Poland) Jerzy Janowicz
4. (Germany) Daniel Brands

== Qualifying draw ==
=== First qualifier ===
First Round
1	(Argentina) Diego Junqueira	1	6	6
(Italy) Riccardo Bellotti	6	3	1
WC	(New Zealand) Jaden Grinter	6	7^{11}
(Austria) Herbert Wiltschnig	3	6^{9}
(Republic of Ireland) Louk Sorensen	6^{4}	5
(Croatia) Borut Puc	7^{7}	7
(Switzerland) Henri Laaksonen	3	6	2
7	(Croatia) Antonio Veić	6	2	6

Second Round
1	(Argentina) Diego Junqueira	6	6
WC	(New Zealand) Jaden Grinter	2	2
(Croatia) Borut Puc	6	4	2
7	(Croatia) Antonio Veić	2	6	6

Qualifying Competition
1	(Argentina) Diego Junqueira	4	3
7	(Croatia) Antonio Veić	6	6

=== Second qualifier ===
First Round
2	(Brazil) João Souza	3	6	6
(Austria) Maximilian Neuchrist	6	3	4
(Austria) Patrick Ofner	3	6^{4}
(Austria) Tristan-Samuel Weissborn	6	7^{7}
(Austria) Bastian Trinker	6	6^{2}	6
(Austria) Marc Rath	4	7^{7}	2
(Croatia) Mate Pavić	7^{7}	6^{6}	2
5	(Romania) Victor Crivoi	6^{3}	7^{8}	6

Second Round
2	(Brazil) João Souza	2	7^{7}	6
(Austria) Tristan-Samuel Weissborn	6	6^{1}	1
(Austria) Bastian Trinker	5	2
5	(Romania) Victor Crivoi	7	6

Qualifying Competition
2	(Brazil) João Souza	6	7^{12}
5	(Romania) Victor Crivoi	2	6^{10}

=== Third qualifier ===
First Round
3	(Poland) Jerzy Janowicz	7^{7}	4	6
(Germany) Peter Steinberger	6^{4}	6	2
(Austria) Gibril Diarra	3	2
(Croatia) Joško Topić	6	6
(Austria) Daniel Geib	6	2	7^{7}
WC	(Austria) Dennis Novak	3	6	6^{5}
(Italy) Thomas Fabbiano	7^{7}	0	3
8	(Slovakia) Ivo Klec	6^{1}	6	6

Second Round
3	(Poland) Jerzy Janowicz	6	6
(Croatia) Joško Topić	4	2
(Austria) Daniel Geib	3	3
8	(Slovakia) Ivo Klec	6	6

Qualifying Competition
3	(Poland) Jerzy Janowicz	4	6	7
8	(Slovakia) Ivo Klec	6	4	5

=== Fourth qualifier ===
First Round
4	(Germany) Daniel Brands	6	7
(France) Laurent Recouderc	2	5
(Germany) Dennis Blömke	4	7	2
(Austria) Max Raditschnigg	6	5	6
(Austria) Michael Eibl	3	0
(Australia) Colin Ebelthite	6	6
(Australia) Peter Luczak	0	7	6
6	(Slovakia) Andrej Martin	6	6^{2}	3

Second Round
4	(Germany) Daniel Brands	6	6
(Austria) Max Raditschnigg	4	3
(Australia) Colin Ebelthite	4	7	2
(Australia) Peter Luczak	6	5	6

Qualifying Competition
4	(Germany) Daniel Brands	7^{8}	7
(Australia) Peter Luczak	6^{6}	5
