= 2011 Bet-at-home Cup Kitzbühel – Doubles =

Doubles
- 2011 Bet-at-home Cup Kitzbühel

Final
- Champions: (Italy) Daniele Bracciali (Mexico) Santiago González
- Runners-up: (Brazil) Franco Ferreiro (Brazil) André Sá
- Score: 7–6^{(7–1)}, 4–6, [11–9]

Details
- Draw: 16
- Seeds: 4

Events
Singles	Doubles
- Bet-at-home Cup Kitzbühel

Dustin Brown and Rogier Wassen were the defending champions, but decided not to participate together.
Brown plays alongside Michael Kohlmann, while Wassen partners up with Lukáš Rosol. Brown lost in the first round to Santiago Giraldo and Pere Riba and Wassen lost in the second round to Franco Ferreiro and André Sá.

Daniele Bracciali and Santiago González won the title, defeating Franco Ferreiro and André Sá 7–6^{(7–1)}, 4–6, [11–9] in the final.

== Seeds ==
1. (Czech Republic) František Čermák / (Slovakia) Filip Polášek (first round)
2. (Germany) Christopher Kas / (Austria) Alexander Peya (quarterfinals)
3. (Spain) Marcel Granollers / (Spain) Marc López (first round)
4. (Italy) Daniele Bracciali / (Mexico) Santiago González (champions)

== Draw ==
Key

- Q = Qualifier
- WC = Wild card
- LL = Lucky loser
- Alt = Alternate
- ITF = ITF entry
- PR = Protected ranking
- SR = Special ranking
- SE = Special exempt
- JE = Junior exempt
- JR = Junior Accelerator Programme entrant
- CO = College Accelerator Programme entrant
- NG = Next Gen Accelerator Program entrant
- w/o = Walkover
- r = Retired
- d = Defaulted

=== Draw ===
First round
1	(Czech Republic) F Čermák (Slovakia) F Polášek	2	3
(Romania) V Hănescu (Germany) F Moser	6	6
(Germany) D Brown (Germany) M Kohlmann	4	4
(Colombia) S Giraldo (Spain) P Riba	6	6
4	(Italy) D Bracciali (Mexico) S González	6	6
WC	(Germany) T Haun (Austria) S Koubek	2	3
(United States) J Cerretani (Germany) P Marx	7^{7}	6
(Austria) J Knowle (Slovakia) I Zelenay	6^{4}	4
(Italy) P Starace (Italy) F Volandri	2	3
(Czech Republic) L Rosol (Netherlands) R Wassen	6	6
(Brazil) F Ferreiro (Brazil) A Sá	6	5	[10]
3	(Spain) M Granollers (Spain) M López	4	7	[8]
WC	(Austria) A Haider-Maurer (Austria) T Muster	3	5
(Russia) I Andreev (Spain) D Gimeno-Traver	6	7
(Spain) D Marrero (Spain) R Ramírez Hidalgo	3	5
2	(Germany) C Kas (Austria) A Peya	6	7

Quarterfinals
(Romania) V Hănescu (Germany) F Moser	6	6
(Colombia) S Giraldo (Spain) P Riba	4	3
4	(Italy) D Bracciali (Mexico) S González	6	4	[10]
(United States) J Cerretani (Germany) P Marx	4	6	[8]
(Czech Republic) L Rosol (Netherlands) R Wassen	6^{5}	3
(Brazil) F Ferreiro (Brazil) A Sá	7^{7}	6
(Russia) I Andreev (Spain) D Gimeno-Traver	6	6
2	(Germany) C Kas (Austria) A Peya	3	3

Semifinals
(Romania) V Hănescu (Germany) F Moser	3	4
4	(Italy) D Bracciali (Mexico) S González	6	6
(Brazil) F Ferreiro (Brazil) A Sá	7^{7}	6^{3}	[12]
(Russia) I Andreev (Spain) D Gimeno-Traver	6^{5}	7^{7}	[10]

Final
4	(Italy) D Bracciali (Mexico) S González	7^{7}	4	[11]
(Brazil) F Ferreiro (Brazil) A Sá	6^{1}	6	[9]
