= 2014 Qatar ExxonMobil Open – Singles =

Singles
- 2014 Qatar ExxonMobil Open

Final
- Champion: (Spain) Rafael Nadal
- Runner-up: (France) Gaël Monfils
- Score: 6–1, 6–7^{(5–7)}, 6–2

Details
- Draw: 32 (4 Q / 3 WC )
- Seeds: 8

Events
Singles	Doubles
- ATP Qatar Open

Richard Gasquet was the defending champion, but he lost in the second round to Gaël Monfils.
Rafael Nadal won the title, defeating Monfils in the final, 6–1, 6–7^{(5–7)}, 6–2.

== Seeds ==
1. (Spain) Rafael Nadal (champion)
2. (Spain) David Ferrer (second round)
3. (United Kingdom) Andy Murray (second round)
4. (Czech Republic) Tomáš Berdych (first round)

5. (France) Richard Gasquet (second round)
6. (Germany) Philipp Kohlschreiber (second round)
7. (Latvia) Ernests Gulbis (quarterfinals)
8. (Spain) Fernando Verdasco (second round)

== Draw ==
=== Finals ===
Semifinals
1	(Spain) Rafael Nadal	4	6	6
Q	(Germany) Peter Gojowczyk	6	2	3
(Germany) Florian Mayer	3	2
(France) Gaël Monfils	6	6

Final
1	(Spain) Rafael Nadal	6	6^{5}	6
(France) Gaël Monfils	1	7^{7}	2

=== Top half ===
First round
1	(Spain) R Nadal	6	7^{9}
(Czech Republic) L Rosol	2	6^{7}
WC	(Tunisia) M Jaziri	3	4
(Germany) T Kamke	6	6
(Spain) D Gimeno-Traver	4	3
(Poland) Ł Kubot	6	6
Q	(United Kingdom) D Evans	2	6	0
7	(Latvia) E Gulbis	6	4	6
4	(Czech Republic) T Berdych	6^{7}	6^{4}
(Croatia) I Karlović	7^{9}	7^{7}
Q	(Germany) D Brown	6	6
(Croatia) I Dodig	4	2
Q	(Germany) P Gojowczyk	7	6
Q	(Austria) D Thiem	5	0
(Spain) P Andújar	6^{7}	2
6	(Germany) P Kohlschreiber	7^{9}	6

Second round
1	(Spain) R Nadal	6	6^{3}	6
(Germany) T Kamke	3	7^{7}	3
(Poland) Ł Kubot	2	6	3
7	(Latvia) E Gulbis	6	4	6
(Croatia) I Karlović	6	6^{13}	4
Q	(Germany) D Brown	3	7^{15}	6
Q	(Germany) P Gojowczyk	7^{7}	7^{9}
6	(Germany) P Kohlschreiber	6^{4}	6^{7}

Quarterfinals
1	(Spain) R Nadal	7	6
7	(Latvia) E Gulbis	5	4
Q	(Germany) D Brown	3	6	6^{5}
Q	(Germany) P Gojowczyk	6	3	7^{7}

Semifinals
1	(Spain) R Nadal	4	6	6
Q	(Germany) P Gojowczyk	6	2	3

=== Bottom half ===
First round
8	(Spain) F Verdasco	6	6
(Italy) F Volandri	3	3
(Portugal) J Sousa	3	2
(Romania) V Hănescu	6	6
(Poland) M Przysiężny	2	6	6^{5}
(Germany) F Mayer	6	3	7^{7}
WC	(Qatar) MS Zayed	0	0
3	(United Kingdom) A Murray	6	6
5	(France) R Gasquet	7	6
WC	(Egypt) K Hossam	5	1
(Colombia) S Giraldo	6^{1}	2
(France) G Monfils	7^{7}	6
(Germany) D Brands	6	6
(Russia) N Davydenko	4	4
(Ukraine) A Dolgopolov	3	7	3
2	(Spain) D Ferrer	6	5	6

Second round
8	(Spain) F Verdasco	6	6^{0}	2
(Romania) V Hănescu	4	7^{7}	6
(Germany) F Mayer	3	6	6
3	(United Kingdom) A Murray	6	4	2
5	(France) R Gasquet	2	5
(France) G Monfils	6	7
(Germany) D Brands	6	7
2	(Spain) D Ferrer	4	5

Quarterfinals
(Romania) V Hănescu	4	7^{10}	4
(Germany) F Mayer	6	6^{8}	6
(France) G Monfils	6	6
(Germany) D Brands	2	1

Semifinals
(Germany) F Mayer	3	2
(France) G Monfils	6	6

== Qualifying ==
=== Seeds ===
1. (Russia) Teymuraz Gabashvili (first round)
2. (Russia) Alex Bogomolov Jr. (second round)
3. (United States) Donald Young (first round)
4. (Slovenia) Blaž Kavčič (qualifying competition)
5. (Czech Republic) Jan Hájek (second round)
6. (Germany) Jan-Lennard Struff (second round)
7. (Germany) Dustin Brown (qualified)
8. (Russia) Andrey Kuznetsov (first round)

=== Qualifiers ===
1. (United Kingdom) Daniel Evans
2. (Germany) Dustin Brown
3. (Austria) Dominic Thiem
4. (Germany) Peter Gojowczyk

=== Qualifying draw ===
==== First qualifier ====
First round
1	(Russia) Teymuraz Gabashvili	4	4
(Czech Republic) Jan Hernych	6	6
(United Kingdom) Daniel Evans	6	6
(United States) Michael Shabaz	0	4
(Italy) Matteo Viola	5	4
(Japan) Taro Daniel	7	6
WC	(Qatar) Abdullah Shannan Alharrasi	0	0
5	(Czech Republic) Jan Hájek	6	6

Second round
(Czech Republic) Jan Hernych	6	6^{6}	4
(United Kingdom) Daniel Evans	2	7^{8}	6
(Japan) Taro Daniel	2	6	7
5	(Czech Republic) Jan Hájek	6	3	5

Qualifying competition
(United Kingdom) Daniel Evans	6	6
(Japan) Taro Daniel	2	2

==== Second qualifier ====
First round
2	(Russia) Alex Bogomolov Jr.
(Switzerland) Marco Chiudinelli	w/o
(Greece) Theodoros Angelinos	4	5
(Slovakia) Ivo Klec	6	7
(Canada) Filip Peliwo	3	2
(France) Florent Serra	6	6
(Italy) Thomas Fabbiano	6^{3}	3
7	(Germany) Dustin Brown	7^{7}	6

Second round
2	(Russia) Alex Bogomolov Jr.	4	4
(Slovakia) Ivo Klec	6	6
(France) Florent Serra	2	3
7	(Germany) Dustin Brown	6	6

Qualifying competition
(Slovakia) Ivo Klec	3	2
7	(Germany) Dustin Brown	6	6

==== Third qualifier ====
First round
3	(United States) Donald Young	4	4
(Austria) Dominic Thiem	6	6
(Italy) Marco Cecchinato	6	6
WC	(Qatar) Jassem Al Zeyara	0	1
(Germany) Matthias Bachinger	6	7^{9}
(Slovakia) Miloslav Mečíř Jr.	4	6^{7}
(Serbia) Filip Krajinović	6	6
8	(Russia) Andrey Kuznetsov	4	3

Second round
(Austria) Dominic Thiem	1	6	6
(Italy) Marco Cecchinato	6	3	2
(Germany) Matthias Bachinger	6	4	7^{7}
(Serbia) Filip Krajinović	3	6	6^{5}

Qualifying competition
(Austria) Dominic Thiem	6	7^{7}
(Germany) Matthias Bachinger	4	6^{5}

==== Fourth qualifier ====
First round
4	(Slovenia) Blaž Kavčič	6	6
WC	(Qatar) Abdulla Al Mohamud	0	0
(Russia) Valery Rudnev	4	6	7^{7}
PR	(Russia) Philipp Davydenko	6	4	6^{4}
(Germany) Peter Gojowczyk	6	6
WC	(Qatar) Abdulla Al-Jufairi	0	0
(Egypt) Mohamed Safwat	4	6	2
6	(Germany) Jan-Lennard Struff	6	4	6

Second round
4	(Slovenia) Blaž Kavčič	6^{2}	6	6
(Russia) Valery Rudnev	7^{7}	2	4
(Germany) Peter Gojowczyk	7^{7}	6
6	(Germany) Jan-Lennard Struff	6^{1}	1

Qualifying competition
4	(Slovenia) Blaž Kavčič	3	3
(Germany) Peter Gojowczyk	6	6
