= 2014 Qatar ExxonMobil Open =

- Date: 30 December 2013 – 5 January 2014
- Edition: 22nd
- Category: ATP World Tour 250 series
- Draw: 32S / 16D
- Prize money: $1,024,000
- Surface: Hard / outdoor
- Location: Doha, Qatar

Champions

Singles
- (Spain) Rafael Nadal

Doubles
- (Czech Republic) Tomáš Berdych / (Czech Republic) Jan Hájek
← 2013 ·	ATP Qatar Open	· 2015 →

The 2014 Qatar Open (also known as 2014 Qatar ExxonMobil Open for sponsorship reasons) was a men's tennis tournament that was played on outdoor hard courts. It was the 22nd edition of the Qatar Open, and part of the ATP World Tour 250 series of the 2014 ATP World Tour. It took place at the Khalifa International Tennis and Squash Complex in Doha, Qatar, from 30 December 2013 until 5 January 2014. First-seeded Rafael Nadal won the singles title.

== Finals ==
=== Singles ===
(Spain) Rafael Nadal defeated (France) Gaël Monfils, 6–1, 6–7^{(5–7)}, 6–2

- It was Nadal's 1st singles title of the year and the 61st of his career.

=== Doubles ===
(Czech Republic) Tomáš Berdych / (Czech Republic) Jan Hájek' defeated (Austria) Alexander Peya / (Brazil) Bruno Soares, 6–2, 6–4

== Points and prize money ==
=== Point distribution ===
Event	W	F	SF	QF	Round of 16	Round of 32	Q	Q3	Q2	Q1
Singles	250	150	90	45	20	0	12	6	0	0
Doubles	250	150	90	45	0	—	—	—	—	—

=== Prize money ===
Event	W	F	SF	QF	Round of 16	Round of 32	Q3	Q2	Q1
Singles	$188,600	$99,325	$53,800	$30,655	$18,060	$10,700	$1,820	$870	—
Doubles	$60,400	$31,750	$17,210	$9,840	$5,770	—	—	—	—
Doubles prize money per team

== Singles main-draw entrants ==
=== Seeds ===
Country	Player	Rank^{1}	Seed
ESP	Rafael Nadal	1	1
ESP	David Ferrer	3	2
GRB	Andy Murray	4	3
CZE	Tomáš Berdych	7	4
FRA	Richard Gasquet	9	5
GER	Philipp Kohlschreiber	22	6
LAT	Ernests Gulbis	24	7
ESP	Fernando Verdasco	30	8

- ^{1} Rankings as of December 23, 2013

=== Other entrants ===
The following players received wildcards into the singles main draw:

- (Egypt) Karim Hossam
- (Tunisia) Malek Jaziri
- (Qatar) Mousa Shanan Zayed

The following players received entry from the qualifying draw:

- (Germany) Dustin Brown
- (United Kingdom) Daniel Evans
- (Germany) Peter Gojowczyk
- (Austria) Dominic Thiem

== ATP doubles main-draw entrants ==
=== Seeds ===
Country	Player	Country	Player	Rank^{1}	Seed
AUT	Alexander Peya	BRA	Bruno Soares	7	1
ESP	David Marrero	ESP	Fernando Verdasco	13	2
CRO	Ivan Dodig	BRA	Marcelo Melo	13	3
PHI	Treat Huey	GBR	Dominic Inglot	49	4

- ^{1} Rankings as of December 23, 2013

=== Other entrants ===
The following pairs received wildcards into the doubles main draw:

- (Tunisia) Malek Jaziri / (Qatar) Mousa Shanan Zayed
- (Spain) Rafael Nadal / (Spain) Francisco Roig
