= 2018 Bengaluru Open =

- Date: 12–17 November
- Edition: 3rd
- Draw: 32S / 16D
- Surface: Hard
- Location: Bangalore, India

Champions

Singles
- (India) Prajnesh Gunneswaran

Doubles
- (Australia) Max Purcell / (Australia) Luke Saville
- Bengaluru Open

The 2018 Bengaluru Open was a professional tennis tournament played on hard courts. It was the third edition of the tournament which was part of the 2018 ATP Challenger Tour. It took place in Bangalore, India from 12 to 17 November 2018.

== Singles main-draw entrants ==
=== Seeds ===
Country	Player	Rank^{1}	Seed
MDA	Radu Albot	100	1
ARG	Marco Trungelliti	121	2
SWE	Elias Ymer	130	3
IND	Prajnesh Gunneswaran	141	4
AUS	Marc Polmans	142	5
FRA	Quentin Halys	145	6
GBR	Jay Clarke	174	7
CAN	Filip Peliwo	181	8

- ^{1} Rankings are as of 5 November 2018.

=== Other entrants ===
The following players received wildcards into the singles main draw:

- (India) Adil Kalyanpur
- (India) Saketh Myneni
- (India) Sumit Nagal
- (India) Suraj Prabodh

The following players received entry from the qualifying draw:

- (Germany) Sebastian Fanselow
- (Egypt) Youssef Hossam
- (India) Sasikumar Mukund
- (Hungary) Zsombor Piros

The following player received entry as a lucky loser:

- (Belgium) Zizou Bergs

== Champions ==
=== Singles ===
- (India) Prajnesh Gunneswaran def. (India) Saketh Myneni 6–2, 6–2.

=== Doubles ===
- (Australia) Max Purcell / (Australia) Luke Saville def. (India) Purav Raja / (Croatia) Antonio Šančić 7–6^{(7–3)}, 6–3.
