= 2018 Bengaluru Open – Singles =

Singles
- 2018 Bengaluru Open

Final
- Champion: (India) Prajnesh Gunneswaran
- Runner-up: (India) Saketh Myneni
- Score: 6–2, 6–2

Events
Singles	Doubles
- Bengaluru Open

Sumit Nagal was the defending champion but lost in the quarterfinals to Saketh Myneni.

Prajnesh Gunneswaran won the title after defeating Myneni 6–2, 6–2 in the final.

== Seeds ==
1. (Moldova) Radu Albot (first round)
2. (Argentina) Marco Trungelliti (first round)
3. (Sweden) Elias Ymer (first round)
4. (India) Prajnesh Gunneswaran (champion)
5. (Australia) Marc Polmans (second round)
6. (France) Quentin Halys (second round)
7. (United Kingdom) Jay Clarke (first round)
8. (Canada) Filip Peliwo (first round)

== Draw ==
Key

- Q = Qualifier
- WC = Wild card
- LL = Lucky loser
- Alt = Alternate
- ITF = ITF entry
- PR = Protected ranking
- SR = Special ranking
- SE = Special exempt
- JE = Junior exempt
- JR = Junior Accelerator Programme entrant
- CO = College Accelerator Programme entrant
- NG = Next Gen Accelerator Program entrant
- w/o = Walkover
- r = Retired
- d = Defaulted

=== Finals ===
Semifinals
WC	(India) Saketh Myneni	4	6	6
(Kazakhstan) Aleksandr Nedovyesov	6	4	4
4	(India) Prajnesh Gunneswaran	6	6
(Canada) Brayden Schnur	4	1

Final
WC	(India) Saketh Myneni	2	2
4	(India) Prajnesh Gunneswaran	6	6

=== Top half ===
First round
1	(Moldova) R Albot	6	2	2
Q	(Egypt) Y Hossam	2	6	6
WC	(India) A Kalyanpur	3	6^{3}
WC	(India) S Myneni	6	7^{7}
(Chinese Taipei) T-h Yang	6^{4}	4
(United Kingdom) J Ward	7^{7}	6
WC	(India) S Nagal	6	7
7	(United Kingdom) J Clarke	4	5
3	(Sweden) E Ymer	4	5
(Germany) D Masur	6	7
(Portugal) F Ferreira Silva	6	3	6
(Serbia) D Petrović	3	6	4
(Kazakhstan) A Nedovyesov	6	6
(Netherlands) S Griekspoor	3	2
(Australia) M Banes	6	4	2
5	(Australia) M Polmans	1	6	6

Second round
Q	(Egypt) Y Hossam	1	6	1
WC	(India) S Myneni	6	3	6
(United Kingdom) J Ward	3	6^{4}
WC	(India) S Nagal	6	7^{7}
(Germany) D Masur	7	4	2
(Portugal) F Ferreira Silva	5	6	6
(Kazakhstan) A Nedovyesov	6	6
5	(Australia) M Polmans	2	4

Quarterfinals
WC	(India) S Myneni	6	6
WC	(India) S Nagal	4	4
(Portugal) F Ferreira Silva	4	2
(Kazakhstan) A Nedovyesov	6	6

Semifinals
WC	(India) S Myneni	4	6	6
(Kazakhstan) A Nedovyesov	6	4	4

=== Bottom half ===
First round
8	(Canada) F Peliwo	2	0
(Slovenia) B Kavčič	6	6
(United States) C Altamirano	6^{6}	3
Q	(India) S Mukund	7^{8}	6
Q	(Germany) S Fanselow	7^{7}	6
Q	(Hungary) Z Piros	6^{3}	4
(Russia) I Nedelko	2	2
4	(India) P Gunneswaran	6	6
6	(France) Q Halys	6	6
WC	(India) Suraj Prabodh	3	1
(Australia) M Purcell	4	6^{3}
(Canada) B Schnur	6	7^{7}
LL	(Belgium) Z Bergs	6	6
(Germany) K Krawietz	1	2
(Turkey) C İlkel	6	3	7^{7}
2	(Argentina) M Trungelliti	2	6	6^{3}

Second round
(Slovenia) B Kavčič	6^{2}	1^{r}
Q	(India) S Mukund	7^{7}	3
Q	(Germany) S Fanselow	6	4	5
4	(India) P Gunneswaran	4	6	7
6	(France) Q Halys	4	6^{3}
(Canada) B Schnur	6	7^{7}
LL	(Belgium) Z Bergs	5	3
(Turkey) C İlkel	7	6

Quarterfinals
Q	(India) S Mukund	0^{r}
4	(India) P Gunneswaran	0
(Canada) B Schnur	6	6
(Turkey) C İlkel	3	4

Semifinals
4	(India) P Gunneswaran	6	6
(Canada) B Schnur	4	1
