= 2013 Qatar Open – Doubles =

Doubles
- 2013 Qatar Open

Final
- Champions: (Germany) Christopher Kas (Germany) Philipp Kohlschreiber
- Runners-up: (Austria) Julian Knowle (Slovakia) Filip Polášek
- Score: 7–5, 6–4

Details
- Draw: 16
- Seeds: 4

Events
Singles	Doubles
← 2012 ·	ATP Qatar Open	· 2014 →

Filip Polášek and Lukáš Rosol were the defending champions but decided not to participate together. Polášek partnered up Julian Knowle, while Rosol decided not to participate.
Christopher Kas and Philipp Kohlschreiber won the title winning against Knowle and Polášek by 7–5, 6–4.

== Seeds ==
1. (Sweden) Robert Lindstedt / (Serbia) Nenad Zimonjić (first round)
2. (Austria) Julian Knowle / (Slovakia) Filip Polášek (final)
3. (Italy) Daniele Bracciali / (Austria) Oliver Marach (semifinals)
4. (Czech Republic) František Čermák / (Slovakia) Michal Mertiňák (first round)

== Draw ==
=== Key ===
- Q = Qualifier
- WC = Wild card
- LL = Lucky loser
- Alt = Alternate
- SE = Special exempt
- PR = Protected ranking
- ITF = ITF entry
- JE = Junior exempt
- w/o = Walkover
- r = Retired
- d = Defaulted
- SR = Special ranking

=== Draw ===
First round
1	(Sweden) R Lindstedt (Serbia) N Zimonjić	2	2
(Philippines) TC Huey (United Kingdom) D Inglot	6	6
(Germany) C Kas (Germany) P Kohlschreiber	6	6
(Serbia) V Troicki (Slovenia) G Žemlja	3	3
3	(Italy) D Bracciali (Austria) O Marach	7	6
(Spain) P Andújar (Spain) F López	5	4
(France) J Chardy (Poland) Ł Kubot	6	6
WC	(Qatar) JM Ali Mutawa (Egypt) M Safwat	1	0
(Germany) D Brown (United Kingdom) J Marray	6	7
(Slovakia) L Lacko (Spain) A Ramos	2	5
(Israel) J Erlich (Russia) M Youzhny	4	6	[10]
4	(Czech Republic) F Čermák (Slovakia) M Mertiňák	6	3	[7]
WC	(Qatar) A Harib (Qatar) MS Zayed	1	1
(Italy) F Fognini (Spain) D Marrero	6	6
(Germany) B Becker (Croatia) I Dodig	7^{7}	3	[8]
2	(Austria) J Knowle (Slovakia) F Polášek	6^{1}	6	[10]

Quarterfinals
(Philippines) TC Huey (United Kingdom) D Inglot	7^{7}	4	[8]
(Germany) C Kas (Germany) P Kohlschreiber	6^{4}	6	[10]
3	(Italy) D Bracciali (Austria) O Marach	7^{12}	4	[10]
(France) J Chardy (Poland) Ł Kubot	6^{10}	6	[6]
(Germany) D Brown (United Kingdom) J Marray	7^{7}	7^{8}
(Israel) J Erlich (Russia) M Youzhny	6^{3}	6^{6}
(Italy) F Fognini (Spain) D Marrero	4	4
2	(Austria) J Knowle (Slovakia) F Polášek	6	6

Semifinals
(Germany) C Kas (Germany) P Kohlschreiber	6	7
3	(Italy) D Bracciali (Austria) O Marach	4	5
(Germany) D Brown (United Kingdom) J Marray	5	7^{7}	[6]
2	(Austria) J Knowle (Slovakia) F Polášek	7	6^{5}	[10]

Final
(Germany) C Kas (Germany) P Kohlschreiber	7	6
2	(Austria) J Knowle (Slovakia) F Polášek	5	4
