= 2014 Qatar ExxonMobil Open – Doubles =

Doubles
- 2014 Qatar ExxonMobil Open

Final
- Champions: (Czech Republic) Tomáš Berdych (Czech Republic) Jan Hájek
- Runners-up: (Austria) Alexander Peya (Brazil) Bruno Soares
- Score: 6–2, 6–4

Details
- Draw: 16
- Seeds: 4

Events
Singles	Doubles
← 2013 ·	ATP Qatar Open	· 2015 →

Christopher Kas and Philipp Kohlschreiber were the defending champions, but they lost in semifinals to Tomáš Berdych and Jan Hájek.
Berdych and Hájek went on to win the title, defeating Alexander Peya and Bruno Soares in the final, 6–2, 6–4.

== Seeds ==
1. (Austria) Alexander Peya / (Brazil) Bruno Soares (final)
2. (Spain) David Marrero / (Spain) Fernando Verdasco (first round)
3. (Croatia) Ivan Dodig / (Brazil) Marcelo Melo (semifinals)
4. (Philippines) Treat Conrad Huey / (United Kingdom) Dominic Inglot (quarterfinals)

== Draw ==
=== Key ===
- Q = Qualifier
- WC = Wild card
- LL = Lucky loser
- Alt = Alternate
- SE = Special exempt
- PR = Protected ranking
- ITF = ITF entry
- JE = Junior exempt
- w/o = Walkover
- r = Retired
- d = Defaulted
- SR = Special ranking

=== Draw ===
First round
1	(Austria) A Peya (Brazil) B Soares	6	6
WC	(Tunisia) M Jaziri (Qatar) MS Zayed	1	4
(United Kingdom) A Murray (Serbia) N Zimonjić	3	7^{7}	[10]
(Germany) D Brands (Germany) F Mayer	6	6^{5}	[8]
3	(Croatia) I Dodig (Brazil) M Melo	6	4	[10]
(Poland) Ł Kubot (Poland) M Matkowski	4	6	[4]
WC	(Spain) R Nadal (Spain) F Roig	6	2	[10]
(Spain) P Andújar (Czech Republic) L Rosol	3	6	[4]
(Italy) D Bracciali (Austria) J Knowle	2	5
(Germany) C Kas (Germany) P Kohlschreiber	6	7
(Ukraine) A Dolgopolov (Russia) T Gabashvili	3	6^{4}
4	(Philippines) TC Huey (United Kingdom) D Inglot	6	7^{7}
(Czech Republic) T Berdych (Czech Republic) J Hájek	6	6
(Colombia) S Giraldo (Portugal) J Sousa	3	2
(Austria) O Marach (Romania) F Mergea	6	6^{5}	[12]
2	(Spain) D Marrero (Spain) F Verdasco	3	7^{7}	[10]

Quarterfinals
1	(Austria) A Peya (Brazil) B Soares	7^{7}	6
(United Kingdom) A Murray (Serbia) N Zimonjić	6^{5}	4
3	(Croatia) I Dodig (Brazil) M Melo	6	7^{7}
WC	(Spain) R Nadal (Spain) F Roig	4	6^{1}
(Germany) C Kas (Germany) P Kohlschreiber	7^{7}	7
4	(Philippines) TC Huey (United Kingdom) D Inglot	6^{2}	5
(Czech Republic) T Berdych (Czech Republic) J Hájek	2	6	[10]
(Austria) O Marach (Romania) F Mergea	6	3	[4]

Semifinals
1	(Austria) A Peya (Brazil) B Soares	6	6
3	(Croatia) I Dodig (Brazil) M Melo	3	3
(Germany) C Kas (Germany) P Kohlschreiber	2	3
(Czech Republic) T Berdych (Czech Republic) J Hájek	6	6

Final
1	(Austria) A Peya (Brazil) B Soares	2	4
(Czech Republic) T Berdych (Czech Republic) J Hájek	6	6
