= Tennis Integrity Unit =

- Sport: Professional tennis
- Jurisdiction: International
- Abbreviation: TIU
- Founded: 2008
- Headquarters: Bank Lane, Roehampton, London, SW15 5XZ, United Kingdom
- CEO: Jonny Gray
- Director: Nigel Willerton
- Other key staff: Jennie Price; Sal Perna; Bob Harayda; Philip Craven; Avril Martindale
- Closure date: 2020

Official website
- tennisintegrityunit.com

The Tennis Integrity Unit was the organisation responsible for investigating match fixing in tennis since 2008 until 2020. It was replaced by the International Tennis Integrity Agency. It had the ability to impose fines and sanctions, and ban players, umpires, and other tennis officials from participating in tournaments.

The TIU was an operationally independent arm of the International Tennis Federation (ITF) and had the authority to impose fines, sanctions, and bans on players, umpires, and officials involved in corruption. It was set up after an investigation into allegations of match fixing in 2008.

== Last investigations and sanctions ==
Last updated on: 19 December 2020.

=== Last suspensions ===
See current suspensions in International Tennis Integrity Agency.

- (Tunisia) Majed Kilani (match official suspended for seven years + US$7,000 fine to be repaid in equal yearly payments)
- (Venezuela) Armando Alfonso Belardi Gonzalez (suspended for two years and six months + US$5,000 fine with US$4,000 suspended)
- (France) Jonathan Kanar (suspended for four years and 6 months + US$2,000 fine)
- (Chile) Juan Carlos Sáez (eight year suspension)
- (Egypt) Issam Taweel (five year suspension with two years suspended + US$15,000 fine with US$13,000 suspended)
- (Nigeria) Henry Atseye (three year suspension, with one year suspended + US$5,000 fine with US$2,500 suspended)
- (Spain) Marc Fornell Mestres (provisionally suspended)
- (Italy) Potito Starace (10 year suspension + US$100,000 fine)
- (Argentina) Patricio Heras (suspended + US$25,000 fine)
- (Argentina) Nicolás Kicker (suspended + US$25,000 fine)
- (Colombia) Barlaham Zuluaga Gaviria (suspended for three years + US$5,000 fine)
- (United States) Nikita Kryvonos (suspended + US$20,000 fine)
- (Poland) Piotr Gadomski (suspended + US$15,000 fine)
- (Spain) Gerard Joseph Platero Rodriguez (suspended for four years + US$15,000 fine)
- (Greece) Antonis Kalaitzakis (tournament director suspended for 16 months + US$3,000 fine)
- (Belarus) Alexey Izotov (chair umpire suspended for three years + US$10,000 fine)

=== Banned ===
- (Spain) Gerard Joseph Platero Rodriguez (banned for four years with six months suspended + US$15,000 fine)
- (Australia) Nick Lindahl (seven year ban + US$35,000 fine)
- (Spain) Enrique López Pérez (banned for eight years + US$25,000 fine)*
- (Bulgaria) Yuri Khachatryan (banned for 10 years + US$50,000 fine)
- (Brazil) Pertti Vesantera (coach banned for five years + US$15,000 fine)
- (United Kingdom) George Kennedy (banned for seven months + US$10,000 fine + US$9,000 suspended)
- (France) David Rocher (line umpire banned for one year and six months + US$5,000 fine + US$4,000 suspended)

* Suspension contested and lifted by Superior Court of Justice of Madrid, Spain.

=== Lifetime ban ===
- (Egypt) Youssef Hossam
- (Brazil) Joao Olavo Soares de Souza (+ US$200,000 fine)
- (Brazil) Diego Matos (+ US$125,000 fine + US$12,000 refund)
- (Ukraine) Helen Ploskina (+ US$20,000 fine)
- (Chile) Mauricio Alvarez-Guzman
- (Italy) Daniele Bracciali (+ US$250,000 fine)
- (Ukraine) Gleb Alekseenko (+ US$250,000 fine)
- (Ukraine) Vadim Alekseenko (+ US$250,000 fine)
- (Thailand) Anucha Tongplew (chair umpire)
- (Thailand) Apisit Promchai (chair umpire)
- (Thailand) Chitchai Srililai (chair umpire)
- (Egypt) Karim Hossam (+ US$15,000 fine)
- (Ukraine) Dmytro Badanov (+ US$100,000 fine)
- (Japan) Junn Mitsuhashi (+ US$50,000 fine)
- (Greece) Konstantinos Mikos
- (Romania) Alexandru-Daniel Carpen
- (South Africa) Joshua Chetty
- (Greece) Alexandros Jakupovic
- (France) Morgan Lamri (tennis official)
- (Russia) Andrey Kumantsov
- (Russia) Sergei Krotiouk(+ US$60,000 fine)
- (Austria) Daniel Köllerer (+ US$100,000 fine)
- (Bulgaria) Karen Khachatryan (+ US$250,000 fine)
- (Ukraine) Stanislav Poplavskyy (+ US$10,000 fine)
- (Bulgaria) Aleksandrina Naydenova (+ US$150,000 fine)
- (Algeria) Aymen Ikhlef (+ US$100,000 fine)

== See also ==
- International Tennis Federation
- ATP Challenger Tour
- ATP rankings
- List of ATP number 1 ranked singles tennis players
- List of ATP number 1 ranked doubles tennis players
- ATP Awards
- ATP Tour records
- Grand Prix Tennis Circuit
- World Championship Tennis
- ATP Champions Tour
- Grand Slam (tennis)
- Women's Tennis Association
- International Tennis Integrity Agency
