= Marat Deviatiarov =

Ukrainian tennis player

Marat Deviatiarov Марат Дев'ятьяров
- Country (sports): Ukraine
- Residence: Kharkiv, Ukraine
- Born: 19 April 1994 (age 32) Kharkiv, Ukraine
- Height: 1.91 m (6 ft 3 in)
- Plays: Right (two handed-backhand)
- Prize money: $79,680

Singles
- Career record: 1–0
- Career titles: 1 ITF
- Highest ranking: No. 538 (25 May 2015)

Grand Slam singles results
- French Open Junior: Q1 (2012)
- Wimbledon Junior: Q2 (2012)

Doubles
- Career titles: 20 ITF
- Highest ranking: No. 313 (25 September 2017)

Grand Slam doubles results
- Wimbledon Junior: 2R (2012)

Team competitions
- Davis Cup: 1–0
- Last updated on: 1 July 2024.

Marat Mansurovych Deviatiarov (Ukrainian: Марат Мансурович Дев'ятьяров; born 19 April 1994 in Kharkiv) is a Ukrainian former tennis player.

== Career ==
Deviatiarov has a career-high singles ranking by the ATP of 538, achieved on 25 May 2015. He also has a career-high ATP doubles ranking of 315, achieved on 25 September 2017.

Deviatiarov has represented Ukraine at the Davis Cup, where he has a win/loss record of 1–0.

== Future and Challenger finals ==
=== Singles: 7 (1–6) ===
Legend ATP Challenger Tour (0–0) ITF Futures Tour (1–6)	Finals by surface Hard (1–6) Clay (0–0)

Result	W–L	Date	Tournament	Tier	Surface	Opponent	Score
Loss	0–1	Feb 2013	Ukraine F1, Cherkasy	Futures	Hard (i)	(Poland) Grzegorz Panfil	3–6, 3–6
Loss	0–2	Jun 2013	Turkey F25, Istanbul	Futures	Hard	(France) Rémi Boutillier	6–7^{(3–7)}, 4–6
Loss	0–3	Nov 2016	Estonia F3, Tallinn	Futures	Hard (i)	(Netherlands) Niels Lootsma	2–6, 4–6
Loss	0–4	Jul 2017	Egypt F19, Sharm El Sheikh	Futures	Hard	(Egypt) Youssef Hossam	3–6, 2–6
Loss	0–5	Apr 2018	Israel F4, Ramat HaSharon	Futures	Hard	(Italy) Alessandro Bega	3–6, 1–6
Loss	0–6	Aug 2019	M15 Kiryat Shmona, Israel	World Tennis Tour	Hard	(Italy) Alessandro Bega	2–6, 6–1, 4–6
Win	1–6	Oct 2019	M15 Doha, Qatar	World Tennis Tour	Hard	(Morocco) Adam Moundir	6–2, 6–3

=== Doubles: 45 (20–25) ===
Legend ATP Challenger Tour (0–0) ITF Futures Tour (20–25)	Finals by surface Hard (12–19) Clay (7–5) Carpet (1–0)

Result	W–L	Date	Tournament	Tier	Surface	Partner	Opponents	Score
Loss	0–1	Oct 2013	Armenia F1, Yerevan	Futures	Clay	(Ukraine) Vladyslav Manafov	(Austria) Michael Linzer (Belgium) Yannik Reuter	6–7^{(6–8)}, 3–6
Loss	0–2	Mar 2014	Ukraine F3, Cherkassy	Futures	Hard	(Germany) Pirmin Hänle	(Ukraine) Vladyslav Manafov (Croatia) Filip Veger	2–6, 3–6
Loss	0–3	May 2014	France F9	Futures	Clay	(Argentina) Pablo Galdón	(Monaco) Benjamin Balleret (France) Jonathan Eysseric	6–7^{(7–9)}, 5–7
Loss	0–4	May 2014	Turkey F17	Futures	Hard	(Russia) Andrei Plotniy	(Russia) Artur Dubinski (Russia) Vladimir Kruk	6–7^{(15–17)}, 6–3, [9–11]
Win	1–4	Jun 2014	Turkey F18	Futures	Hard	(Turkey) Baris Ergüden	(Turkey) Cem Ilkel (Turkey) Efe Yurtacan	7–5, 6–2
Loss	1–5	Jun 2014	Ukraine F7	Futures	Hard	(Spain) Jaime Pulgar-Garcia	(Ukraine) Vladyslav Manafov (Ukraine) Volodymyr Uzhylovskyi	5–7, 2–6
Loss	1–6	Aug 2014	Lithuania F1	Futures	Clay	(France) Jérôme Inzerillo	(Moldova) Maxim Dubarenco (United States) Peter Kobelt	6–4, 6–7^{(2–7)}, [8–10]
Win	2–6	Aug 2014	Turkey F28	Futures	Hard	(United States) Alexios Halebian	(Colombia) Juan Sebastián Gómez (Spain) Gabriel Trujillo Soler	6–4, 6–7^{(2–7)}, [10–2]
Win	3–6	Feb 2015	Turkey F7, Antalya	Futures	Clay	(Austria) Tristan-Samuel Weissborn	(South Africa) Ruan Roelofse (South Africa) Tucker Vorster	7–6^{(7–5)}, 6–2
Loss	3–7	Feb 2015	Turkey F8, Antalya	Futures	Hard	(Austria) Tristan-Samuel Weissborn	(South Africa) Ruan Roelofse (South Africa) Tucker Vorster	7–6^{(7–5)}, 6–7^{(4–7)}, [10–12]
Loss	3–8	Apr 2015	Turkey F16, Antalya	Futures	Hard	(Belgium) Michael Geerts	(France) Yannick Jankovits (Monaco) Hugo Nys	6–7^{(6–8)}, 1–6
Win	4–8	May 2015	Ukraine F2, Cherkassy	Futures	Hard	(France) Maxime Janvier	(Ukraine) Vladyslav Manafov (Ukraine) Volodymyr Uzhylovskyi	6–2, 6–2
Loss	4–9	May 2015	Ukraine F3, Cherkassy	Futures	Hard	(Ukraine) Volodymyr Uzhylovskyi	(Ukraine) Bogdan Didenko (United States) Levar Harper-Griffith	4–6, 2–6
Win	5–9	Oct 2015	Ukraine F4, Cherkassy	Futures	Clay	(Czech Republic) Libor Salaba	(Argentina) Mauricio Perez-Mota (France) François-Arthur Vibert	6–2, 6–1
Win	6–9	Oct 2015	Ukraine F5, Cherkassy	Futures	Clay	(Czech Republic) Libor Salaba	(Ukraine) Vladyslav Manafov (Ukraine) Volodymyr Uzhylovskyi	1–6, 6–4, [10–7]
Win	7–9	Oct 2015	Ukraine F6, Cherkassy	Futures	Clay	(Czech Republic) Libor Salaba	(Ukraine) Vitalii Shcherba (Ukraine) Vitaliy Sachko	6–4, 6–3
Win	8–9	Mar 2016	Azerbaijan F5, Baku	Futures	Carpet	(Ukraine) Danylo Kalenichenko	(Russia) Alexander Igoshin (Russia) Yan Sabanin	6–4, 6–4
Loss	8–10	Oct 2016	Ukraine F6, Kyiv	Futures	Hard	(Italy) Francesco Vilardo	(Lithuania) Lukas Mugevicius (Ukraine) Vladyslav Manafov	2–6, 2–6
Win	9–10	Nov 2016	Estonia F4, Pärnu	Futures	Hard	(Russia) Aleksandr Vasilenko	(Estonia) Vladimir Ivanov (Estonia) Kenneth Raisma	w/o
Loss	9–11	Dec 2016	Turkey F48, Antalya	Futures	Hard	(Bulgaria) Alexandar Lazov	(Turkey) Tuna Altuna (Turkey) Cem Ilkel	4–6, 2–6
Loss	9–12	Feb 2017	Turkey F5, Antalya	Futures	Hard	(Japan) Yuichi Ito	(Czech Republic) Michal Konecny (Czech Republic) Matěj Vocel	3–6, 6–3, [7–10]
Loss	9–13	Mar 2017	Portugal F2, Faro	Futures	Hard	(Switzerland) Antoine Bellier	(United Kingdom) James Marsalek (Austria) Lucas Miedler	7–5, 1–6, [6–10]
Loss	9–14	Mar 2017	Portugal F5, Quinta Da Marinha	Futures	Clay	(Portugal) Gonçalo Oliveira	(Belgium) Clemens Geens (Belgium) Jeroen Vanneste	1–6, 6–4, [4–10]
Loss	9–15	Jul 2017	Egypt F18, Sharm El Sheikh	Futures	Hard	(Egypt) Issam Haitham Taweel	(Egypt) Youssef Hossam (United States) Junior A. Ore	2–6, 3–6
Win	10–15	Jul 2017	Egypt F19, Sharm El Sheikh	Futures	Hard	(Czech Republic) Tomas Papik	(Zimbabwe) Benjamin Lock (United States) Nathaniel Lammons	6–4, 1–6, [10–5]
Win	11–15	Jul 2017	Turkey F27, Istanbul	Futures	Clay	(Turkey) Sarp Ağabigün	(Russia) Alexander Igoshin (Bulgaria) Vasko Mladenov	6–2, 7–6^{(7–5)}
Win	12–15	Aug 2017	Turkey F28, Erzurum	Futures	Hard	(Ukraine) Vladyslav Manafov	(Israel) Alon Elia (Israel) Igor Smilansky	5–7, 6–1, [10–5]
Loss	12–16	Nov 2017	Estonia F4, Pärnu	Futures	Hard	(Russia) Alexander Igoshin	(Belarus) Ivan Liutarevich (Ukraine) Denys Mylokostov	6–4, 3–6, [10–12]
Loss	12–17	Mar 2018	Israel F2, Ramat HaSharon	Futures	Hard	(Ukraine) Volodymyr Uzhylovskyi	(Finland) Harri Heliövaara (Finland) Patrik Niklas-Salminen	3–6, 2–6
Loss	12–18	Apr 2018	Egypt F12, Sharm El Sheikh	Futures	Hard	(Ukraine) Vladyslav Manafov	(Russia) Teymuraz Gabashvili (Austria) Lucas Miedler	4–6, 0–6
Loss	12–19	Jun 2018	Spain F16, Palma del Rio	Futures	Hard	(United Kingdom) Evan Hoyt	(France) Mick Lescure (Colombia) Eduardo Struvay	5–7, 4–6
Win	13–19	Jul 2018	Spain F17, Bakio	Futures	Hard	(United Kingdom) Evan Hoyt	(Belarus) Sergey Betov (Russia) Ivan Gakhov	6–7^{(4–7)}, 7–5, [10–5]
Loss	13–20	Jul 2018	France F13, Ajaccio	Futures	Hard	(Zimbabwe) Benjamin Lock	(France) Mick Lescure (Belgium) Yannick Mertens	5−7, 6–7^{(6–8)}
Win	14–20	Mar 2019	Egypt M15, Sharm El Sheikh	World Tour Tennis	Hard	(Switzerland) Jakub Paul	(Poland) Daniel Michalski (Poland) Kacper Żuk	6−3, 6–4
Loss	14–21	May 2019	M15 Casale Monferrato, Italy	World Tour Tennis	Clay	(Italy) Francesco Vilardo	(Italy) Francesco Forti (Italy) Mattia Frinzi	4−6, 4–6
Win	15–21	Jul 2019	M15 Castelo Branco, Portugal	World Tour Tennis	Hard	(Colombia) Eduardo Struvay	(Portugal) Francisco Dias (Portugal) Goncalo Falcao	6−4, 7–5
Win	16–21	Aug 2019	M15 Chitila, Romania	World Tour Tennis	Clay	(France) Amaury Delmas	(Romania) Vladimir Filip (Romania) Luca George Tatomir	7−6^{(7–5)}, 6–3
Loss	16–22	Aug 2019	M15 Kiryat Shmona, Israel	World Tour Tennis	Hard	(Japan) Takuto Niki	(Italy) Federico Bertuccioli (Italy) Andrea Picchione	6−4, 4–6, [12−14]
Loss	16–23	Feb 2021	M15 St. Petersburg, Russia	World Tour Tennis	Hard	(Moldova) Alexandr Cozbinov	(Czech Republic) Andrew Paulson (Czech Republic) Patrik Rikl	6−4, 4–6, [8−10]
Loss	16–24	Mar 2021	Egypt M15, Sharm El Sheikh	World Tour Tennis	Hard	(Ukraine) Volodymyr Uzhylovskyi	(Netherlands) Ryan Nijboer (Austria) Neil Oberleitner	0−6, 7–5, [6−10]
Win	17–24	May 2021	M15 Jerusalem, Israel	World Tour Tennis	Hard	(Moldova) Alexandr Cozbinov	(United Kingdom) Julian Cash (United States) Felix Corwin	w/o
Win	18–24	Sep 2021	M15 Ulcinj, Montenegro	World Tour Tennis	Clay	(Netherlands) Max Houkes	(Italy) Andrea Basso (Italy) Gianmarco Ferrari	7−5, 6−1
Win	19–24	Oct 2021	Egypt M15, Sharm El Sheikh	World Tour Tennis	Hard	(Ukraine) Volodymyr Uzhylovskyi	(Lithuania) Pijus Vaitiekunas (Lithuania) Simonas Zukauskas	6−4, 6−1
Win	20–24	Dec 2021	M15 Doha, Qatar	World Tour Tennis	Hard	(Chinese Taipei) Hsu Yu-hsiou	(Chinese Taipei) Huang Tsung-hao (Georgia (country)) Saba Purtseladze	6−1, 6−0
Loss	20–25	Jan 2022	M15 Monastir, Tunesia	World Tour Tennis	Hard	(Belgium) Loic Cloes	(Japan) Naoki Tajima (Japan) Kaito Uesugi	w/o
