= 2013 Qatar Open =

- Date: 31 December 2012 – 5 January 2013
- Edition: 21st
- Category: ATP World Tour 250 series
- Draw: 32S / 16D
- Prize money: $1,024,000
- Surface: Hard / outdoor
- Location: Doha, Qatar

Champions

Singles
- (France) Richard Gasquet

Doubles
- (Germany) Christopher Kas / (Germany) Philipp Kohlschreiber
- ATP Qatar Open

The 2013 Qatar Open (also known as 2013 Qatar ExxonMobil Open for sponsorship reasons) was a men's tennis tournament played on outdoor hard courts. It was the 21st edition of the Qatar Open, and part of the ATP World Tour 250 series of the 2013 ATP World Tour. It took place at the Khalifa International Tennis and Squash Complex in Doha, Qatar, from 31 December 2012, through 5 January 2013. Second-seeded Richard Gasquet on the singles title.

== Finals ==
=== Singles ===
- (France) Richard Gasquet defeated (Russia) Nikolay Davydenko, 3–6, 7–6^{(7–4)}, 6–3
- It was Gasquet's 1st singles title of the year and the 8th of his career.

=== Doubles ===
- (Germany) Christopher Kas / (Germany) Philipp Kohlschreiber defeated (Austria) Julian Knowle / (Slovakia) Filip Polášek, 7–5, 6–4

== Singles main-draw entrants ==
=== Seeds ===
Country	Player	Rank^{1}	Seed
ESP	David Ferrer	5	1
FRA	Richard Gasquet	10	2
GER	Philipp Kohlschreiber	20	3
RUS	Mikhail Youzhny	25	4
FRA	Jérémy Chardy	32	5
SRB	Viktor Troicki	38	6
ESP	Feliciano López	40	7
ESP	Pablo Andújar	42	8

- ^{1} Rankings as of December 24, 2012.

=== Other entrants ===
The following players received wildcards into the singles main draw:

- (Qatar) Jabor Mohammed Ali Mutawa
- (Egypt) Mohamed Safwat
- (Qatar) Mousa Shanan Zayed

The following players received entry from the qualifying draw:

- (Germany) Daniel Brands
- (Germany) Dustin Brown
- (Czech Republic) Jan Hernych
- (Germany) Tobias Kamke

=== Withdrawals ===
Before the tournament

- (Belgium) Xavier Malisse
- (Spain) Rafael Nadal

== Doubles main-draw entrants ==
=== Seeds ===
Country	Player	Country	Player	Rank^{1}	Seed
SWE	Robert Lindstedt	SRB	Nenad Zimonjić	28	1
AUT	Julian Knowle	SVK	Filip Polášek	69	2
ITA	Daniele Bracciali	AUT	Oliver Marach	72	3
CZE	František Čermák	SVK	Michal Mertiňák	72	4

- ^{1} Rankings as of December 24, 2012.

=== Other entrants ===
The following pairs received wildcards into the doubles main draw:

- (Qatar) Abdulrahman Harib / (Qatar) Mousa Shanan Zayed
- (Qatar) Jabor Mohammed Ali Mutawa / (Egypt) Mohamed Safwat
