= 2018 Bengaluru Open – Doubles =

Doubles
- 2018 Bengaluru Open

Final
- Champions: (Australia) Max Purcell (Australia) Luke Saville
- Runners-up: (India) Purav Raja (Croatia) Antonio Šančić
- Score: 7–6^{(7–3)}, 6–3

Events
| Singles | Doubles |
| ← 2017 · | Bengaluru Open | · 2020 → |

Mikhail Elgin and Divij Sharan were the defending champions but chose not to defend their title.

Britons Max Purcell and Luke Saville won the title after defeating Purav Raja and Antonio Šančić 7–6^{(7–3)}, 6–3 in the final.

== Seeds ==
1. (Germany) Kevin Krawietz / (India) Jeevan Nedunchezhiyan (first round)
2. (India) Purav Raja / (Croatia) Antonio Šančić (final)
3. (India) Sriram Balaji / (India) Vishnu Vardhan (quarterfinals)
4. (Thailand) Sanchai Ratiwatana / (Thailand) Sonchat Ratiwatana (first round)

== Draw ==
=== Key ===
- Q = Qualifier
- WC = Wild card
- LL = Lucky loser
- Alt = Alternate
- SE = Special exempt
- PR = Protected ranking
- ITF = ITF entry
- JE = Junior exempt
- w/o = Walkover
- r = Retired
- d = Defaulted
- SR = Special ranking

First round
1 | (Germany) K Krawietz (India) J Nedunchezhiyan | 3 | 6 | [7]
(Slovakia) A Martin (Chile) H Podlipnik Castillo | 6 | 3 | [10]
(Chinese Taipei) C-p Hsieh (Chinese Taipei) T-h Yang | 6 | 3 | [10]
(Kazakhstan) A Nedovyesov (Argentina) M Trungelliti | 1 | 6 | [3]
3 | (India) S Balaji (India) V Vardhan | 6 | 6
WC | (India) S Nagal (Canada) B Schnur | 4 | 3
WC | (India) C Sood (India) L Sood | 2 | 2
(Australia) M Purcell (Australia) L Saville | 6 | 6
WC | (India) SDP Dev (India) N Kaliyanda Poonacha | 1 | 7^{7} | [10]
(Russia) A Pavlioutchenkov (Canada) F Peliwo | 6 | 6^{3} | [2]
(India) A Kadhe (India) S Myneni | 6 | 3 | [11]
4 | (Thailand) Sa Ratiwatana (Thailand) So Ratiwatana | 3 | 6 | [9]
(Moldova) R Albot (Australia) M Polmans | 4 | 5
(Slovenia) B Kavčič (Austria) T-S Weissborn | 6 | 7
(Monaco) R Arneodo (France) Q Halys | 4 | 7^{8} | [9]
2 | (India) P Raja (Croatia) A Šančić | 6 | 6^{6} | [11]

Quarterfinals
(Slovakia) A Martin (Chile) H Podlipnik Castillo | 6 | 2 | [2]
(Chinese Taipei) C-p Hsieh (Chinese Taipei) T-h Yang | 4 | 6 | [10]
3 | (India) S Balaji (India) V Vardhan | 6^{3} | 3
(Australia) M Purcell (Australia) L Saville | 7^{7} | 6
WC | (India) SDP Dev (India) N Kaliyanda Poonacha | 3 | 6^{5}
(India) A Kadhe (India) S Myneni | 6 | 7^{7}
(Slovenia) B Kavčič (Austria) T-S Weissborn
2 | (India) P Raja (Croatia) A Šančić | w/o

Semifinals
(Chinese Taipei) C-p Hsieh (Chinese Taipei) T-h Yang | 3 | 4
(Australia) M Purcell (Australia) L Saville | 6 | 6
(India) A Kadhe (India) S Myneni | 6 | 2 | [8]
2 | (India) P Raja (Croatia) A Šančić | 3 | 6 | [10]

Final
(Australia) M Purcell (Australia) L Saville | 7^{7} | 6
2 | (India) P Raja (Croatia) A Šančić | 6^{3} | 3
