= International Tennis Integrity Agency =

International tennis organisation

- Sport: Professional tennis
- Jurisdiction: Global
- Abbreviation: ITIA
- Founded: 2021
- Headquarters: Bank Lane, Roehampton, London, SW15 5XZ, United Kingdom
- CEO: Karen Moorhouse
- Replaced: Tennis Integrity Unit (TIU)

Official website
- itia.tennis

The International Tennis Integrity Agency (ITIA) is the organisation responsible for safeguarding the integrity of professional tennis worldwide. It was established following a comprehensive review of integrity in the sport.

The ITIA assumed responsibility for administering the Tennis Anti-Corruption Program on its formation and for the Tennis Anti-Doping Programme on 1 January 2022.

In addition to prevention, education and drug testing activities, it gathers intelligence and investigates competition manipulation, most notably match fixing in tennis. It has the ability to impose fines and sanctions, and ban players, umpires, and other tennis officials from participating in sanctioned tournaments.

The ITIA is an initiative from the International Governing Bodies (IGBs) of professional tennis: the ITF, ATP, WTA, and the four Grand Slam tournaments (the Australian Open, French Open, Wimbledon and US Open). The organisation assumed the responsibilities of ITF's Tennis Integrity Unit (TIU, 2008–2020). The ITIA is legally independent of the IGBs and makes its own decisions on investigations and prosecutions. In this respect it is unusual in global sports.

== Governance ==
The ITIA is supervised by the Tennis Integrity Supervisory Board (TISB) which has five independent members and four tennis members, representing the IGBs. The TISB is currently chaired by Jennie Price, former CEO of Sport England.

== Leadership and staff ==
The ITIA was founded by its first CEO Jonny Gray, a former senior partner and Global Head of Sport at Control Risks and a former commanding officer of the Argyll and Sutherland Highlanders, decorated for service in The Troubles in Northern Ireland and the Iraq War. Appointed in 2019, it was announced in 2022 that he would step down having made a "significant contribution to integrity in tennis". In late 2022 it was announced that he would be succeeded by Karen Moorhouse, an executive with the Rugby Football League.

It has three Senior Directors. These are:

- Investigations. Jenni Kennedy, former head of integrity at The Football Association.
- Anti-Doping. Nicole Sapstead OBE, former CEO of UKAD.
- Legal. Ben Rutherford, a former legal counsel at World Rugby.

The ITIA has around 35 staff across intelligence, investigations, anti-doping, education & training, legal/case management, communications and administration.

== Tennis Anti-Corruption Program ==
One of the main responsibilities of the ITIA is to administer the Tennis Anti-Corruption Program (TACP) on behalf of the IGBs. The TACP is sets out the various corruption offences in professional tennis, including those related to betting, match fixing and competition manipulation. The ITIA investigates possible offences of the TACP. When it has a sufficiency of evidence it submits a case to an independent Anti-Corruption Hearing Officer (AHO) for a first instance hearing. There are currently seven AHOs. Appeals of first instance decisions are heard de novo at the Court of Arbitration for Sport in Lausanne, Switzerland.

== Tennis Anti-Doping Programme ==
Another main responsibility of the ITIA is to administer the Tennis Anti-Doping Programme (TADP) on behalf of the IGBs. Professional tennis players are tested for substances prohibited by the World Anti-Doping Agency (‘WADA’) and, upon a finding that an Anti-Doping Rule Violation has been committed, sanctions are imposed under the Programme in compliance with the requirements of the World Anti-Doping Code.

== Tennis Integrity Protection Programme ==
The ITIA also administers the Tennis Integrity Protection Programme (TIPP). TIPP is an interactive online e-learning programme designed to inform participants in the sport and thus to protect the integrity of the sport. TIPP is mandatory for all players and officials and must be completed every 2 years. The ITIA also recommend that all those working in tennis such as coaches, tournament staff and agents complete the programme.

== See also ==
- International Tennis Federation
- ATP Challenger Tour
- ATP rankings
- List of ATP number 1 ranked singles tennis players
- List of ATP number 1 ranked doubles tennis players
- ATP Awards
- ATP Tour records
- Grand Prix Tennis Circuit
- World Championship Tennis
- ATP Champions Tour
- Grand Slam (tennis)
- Women's Tennis Association
- Tennis Integrity Unit
