= 2013 Qatar Open – Singles =

Singles
- 2013 Qatar Open

Final
- Champion: (France) Richard Gasquet
- Runner-up: (Russia) Nikolay Davydenko
- Score: 3–6, 7–6^{(7–4)}, 6–3

Details
- Draw: 32 (4 Q / 3 WC )
- Seeds: 8

Events
Singles	Doubles
- ATP Qatar Open

Jo-Wilfried Tsonga was the defending champion, but chose to compete at the Hopman Cup instead.
Richard Gasquet won the 2013 tournament by beating Nikolay Davydenko 3–6, 7–6^{(7–4)}, 6–3 in the final.

== Seeds ==
1. (Spain) David Ferrer (semifinals)
2. (France) Richard Gasquet (champion)
3. (Germany) Philipp Kohlschreiber (second round)
4. (Russia) Mikhail Youzhny (second round)
5. (France) Jérémy Chardy (first round)
6. (Serbia) Viktor Troicki (second round)
7. (Spain) Feliciano López (first round)
8. (Spain) Pablo Andújar (first round)

== Draw ==
=== Finals ===
Semifinals
1	(Spain) David Ferrer	2	3
(Russia) Nikolay Davydenko	6	6
Q	(Germany) Daniel Brands	5	5
2	(France) Richard Gasquet	7	7

Final
(Russia) Nikolay Davydenko	6	6^{4}	3
2	(France) Richard Gasquet	3	7^{7}	6

=== Top half ===
First round
1	(Spain) D Ferrer	5	6	6
Q	(Germany) D Brown	7	3	2
(Spain) R Ramírez Hidalgo	1	2
Q	(Germany) T Kamke	6	6
(Italy) P Lorenzi	7^{7}	6
(Spain) A Ramos	6^{4}	1
(Czech Republic) L Rosol	6	7^{7}
8	(Spain) P Andújar	2	6^{2}
4	(Russia) M Youzhny	4	7^{7}	6
(Germany) B Becker	6	6^{3}	1
(Romania) V Hănescu	2	3
(Russia) N Davydenko	6	6
(Italy) S Bolelli	6	6^{4}	7^{7}
(Spain) D Gimeno-Traver	3	7^{7}	6^{2}
(Poland) Ł Kubot	6	6
7	(Spain) F López	4	2

Second round
1	(Spain) D Ferrer	6	6
Q	(Germany) T Kamke	3	2
(Italy) P Lorenzi	6	6
(Czech Republic) L Rosol	0	4
4	(Russia) M Youzhny	5	3
(Russia) N Davydenko	7	6
(Italy) S Bolelli	2	6	6
(Poland) Ł Kubot	6	4	4

Quarterfinals
1	(Spain) D Ferrer	6	6
(Italy) P Lorenzi	3	0
(Russia) N Davydenko	6	6
(Italy) S Bolelli	1	1

Semifinals
1	(Spain) D Ferrer	2	3
(Russia) N Davydenko	6	6

=== Bottom half ===
First round
5	(France) J Chardy	4	4
Q	(Germany) D Brands	6	6
WC	(Egypt) M Safwat	6	6
WC	(Qatar) JM Ali Mutawa	0	0
(France) G Monfils	6	6
WC	(Qatar) MS Zayed	0	3
(Croatia) I Dodig	6^{5}	1
3	(Germany) P Kohlschreiber	7^{7}	6
6	(Serbia) V Troicki	6	3	6
(Germany) B Phau	3	6	4
(Slovakia) L Lacko	6	2	6
(Spain) G García-López	1	6	4
(Slovenia) G Žemlja	6	3	6
(Italy) F Fognini	2	6	4
Q	(Czech Republic) J Hernych	3	4
2	(France) R Gasquet	6	6

Second round
Q	(Germany) D Brands	4	6	6
WC	(Egypt) M Safwat	6	3	2
(France) G Monfils	6	2	6
3	(Germany) P Kohlschreiber	4	6	4
6	(Serbia) V Troicki	3	5
(Slovakia) L Lacko	6	7
(Slovenia) G Žemlja	7^{9}	4	6^{3}
2	(France) R Gasquet	6^{7}	6	7^{7}

Quarterfinals
Q	(Germany) D Brands	6	7
(France) G Monfils	1	5
(Slovakia) L Lacko	1	3
2	(France) R Gasquet	6	6

Semifinals
Q	(Germany) D Brands	5	5
2	(France) R Gasquet	7	7

== Qualifying ==
=== Seeds ===
1. (Germany) Tobias Kamke (qualified)
2. (Croatia) Ivo Karlović (first round)
3. (France) Josselin Ouanna (qualifying competition)
4. (Croatia) Antonio Veić (first round)
5. (Italy) Matteo Viola (qualifying competition)
6. (Germany) Michael Berrer (qualifying competition)
7. (Switzerland) Marco Chiudinelli (second round)
8. (Germany) Daniel Brands (qualified)

=== Qualifiers ===
1. (Germany) Tobias Kamke
2. (Germany) Dustin Brown
3. (Czech Republic) Jan Hernych
4. (Germany) Daniel Brands

=== Draw ===
==== First qualifier ====
First round
1	(Germany) Tobias Kamke	6	6
WC	(Kuwait) Abdullah Maqdas	2	3
WC	(Qatar) Ali Al-Saygh	0	0
(Germany) Jan-Lennard Struff	6	6
WC	(Qatar) Abdulrahman Harib	0	0
WC	(Kuwait) Mohammed Ghareeb	6	6
(Belgium) Maxime Authom	5	4
5	(Italy) Matteo Viola	7	6

Second round
1	(Germany) Tobias Kamke	6	6
(Germany) Jan-Lennard Struff	2	4
WC	(Kuwait) Mohammed Ghareeb	3	5
5	(Italy) Matteo Viola	6	7

Qualifying competition
1	(Germany) Tobias Kamke	7	6
5	(Italy) Matteo Viola	5	2

==== Second qualifier ====
First round
2	(Croatia) Ivo Karlović	4	6^{5}
(Germany) Peter Gojowczyk	6	7^{7}
(Germany) Dustin Brown	5	6	6
(Czech Republic) Jan Mertl	7	3	4
(Poland) Michał Przysiężny	6^{5}	6^{3}
(Moldova) Radu Albot	7^{7}	7^{7}
(Kazakhstan) Andrey Golubev	3	4
6	(Germany) Michael Berrer	6	6

Second round
(Germany) Peter Gojowczyk	1	7^{8}	3
(Germany) Dustin Brown	6	6^{6}	6
(Moldova) Radu Albot	2	3
6	(Germany) Michael Berrer	6	6

Qualifying competition
(Germany) Dustin Brown	6	2	6
6	(Germany) Michael Berrer	2	6	4

==== Third qualifier ====
First round
3	(France) Josselin Ouanna	6	6
(United States) Michael Yani	4	4
(Croatia) Nikola Mektić	3	6	3
(Serbia) Dušan Lajović	6	4	6
(Slovakia) Pavol Červenák	3	3
(Czech Republic) Jan Hernych	6	6
(France) Nicolas Renavand	7^{7}	6^{2}	2
7	(Switzerland) Marco Chiudinelli	6^{5}	7^{7}	6

Second round
3	(France) Josselin Ouanna	6	5	6
(Serbia) Dušan Lajović	1	7	4
(Czech Republic) Jan Hernych	6	6
7	(Switzerland) Marco Chiudinelli	2	4

Qualifying competition
3	(France) Josselin Ouanna	1	4
(Czech Republic) Jan Hernych	6	6

==== Fourth qualifier ====
First round
4	(Croatia) Antonio Veić	4	7	6^{3}
(France) David Guez	6	5	7^{7}
(France) Vincent Millot	2	3
(Spain) Daniel Muñoz de la Nava	6	6
(Turkey) Marsel İlhan	7^{7}	4	6
(Romania) Marius Copil	6^{3}	6	3
(Germany) Julian Reister	3	7^{7}	3
8	(Germany) Daniel Brands	6	6^{5}	6

Second round
(France) David Guez	2	1
(Spain) Daniel Muñoz de la Nava	6	6
(Turkey) Marsel İlhan	4	6^{2}
8	(Germany) Daniel Brands	6	7^{7}

Qualifying competition
(Spain) Daniel Muñoz de la Nava	7^{10}	4	5
8	(Germany) Daniel Brands	6^{8}	6	7
