= Youssef Hossam =

Egyptian tennis player

Youssef Hossam يوسف حسام
- Country (sports): Egypt
- Residence: 6th of October City, Egypt
- Born: 3 June 1998 (age 27) Giza, Egypt
- Height: 1.78 m (5 ft 10 in)
- Turned pro: 2013
- Retired: 2020 (banned)
- Plays: Right-handed (one-handed backhand)
- Prize money: $56,915

Singles
- Career record: 2–2 (at ATP Tour level, Grand Slam level, and in Davis Cup)
- Career titles: 0
- Highest ranking: No. 291 (11 December 2017)

Grand Slam singles results
- Australian Open Junior: 3R (2016)
- French Open Junior: 1R (2016)
- Wimbledon Junior: 1R (2016)
- US Open Junior: 3R (2016)

Doubles
- Career record: 3–0 (at ATP Tour level, Grand Slam level, and in Davis Cup)
- Career titles: 0
- Highest ranking: No. 562 (27 November 2017)

Grand Slam doubles results
- Australian Open Junior: 2R (2016)
- French Open Junior: QF (2016)
- Wimbledon Junior: QF (2016)
- US Open Junior: QF (2015)

Team competitions
- Davis Cup: 9–2
- Last updated on: 18 November 2019.

Youssef Hossam (Arabic: يوسف حسام; born 3 June 1998) is an Egyptian former professional tennis player who was banned from tennis for life, after he was found guilty of 21 match-fixing and other corruption offences. He was banned in a decision made official 4 May, after a hearing held 9-11 March 2020.

== Tennis career ==
Hossam was born in Giza, Egypt, and lives in Egypt. He had a career-high ATP singles ranking of No. 291, achieved on 11 December 2017. He also had a career-high ATP doubles ranking of No. 562, achieved on 27 November 2017. Hossam had a career-high ranking of no. 8 on the ITF Junior Circuit, achieved on 4 April 2016.

Hossam represented Egypt at the Davis Cup, where he had a W/L record of 9–2.

== Tennis lifetime ban ==
Hossam was found to have effected 21 breaches of the Tennis Anti-Corruption program from 2015 to 2019: eight cases of match-fixing, six cases of facilitating gambling, two cases of soliciting other players not to use best efforts, three failures to report corrupt approaches and two failures to co-operate with a Tennis Integrity Unit investigation. It also ruled he had conspired with others to carry out betting-related corruption at the lower levels of tennis. The TIU stated: "As a result of his conviction, Mr Hossam is now permanently excluded from competing in or attending any sanctioned tennis event organised or recognised by the governing bodies of the sport."

The news came less than two years after his older brother Karim Hossam also was banned for life and was fined $15,000 in 2018, after being found guilty on 16 corruption charges relating to offenses from 2013 to 2017.

== Future and Challenger finals ==
=== Singles: 12 (9-3) ===
Legend
ATP Challengers (0–0)
ITF Futures (9–3)

Titles by surface
Hard (5–1)
Clay (4–2)
Grass (0–0)
Carpet (0–0)

Result	W–L	Date	Tournament	Tier	Surface	Opponent	Score
Loss	0–1	Dec 2016	Cairo Egypt F36	Futures	Clay	(United Kingdom) Jay Clarke	4–6, 4–6
Win	1–1	Jul 2017	Sharm El Sheikh Egypt F18	Futures	Hard	(France) Thomas Bréchemier	6–1, 7–6^{(7–4)}
Win	2–1	Jul 2017	Sharm El Sheikh Egypt F19	Futures	Hard	(Ukraine) Marat Deviatiarov	6–3, 6–2
Win	3–1	Jul 2017	Cairo Egypt F22	Futures	Clay	(Egypt) Mazen Osama	7–6^{(7–5)}, 6–1
Win	4–1	Sep 2017	Cairo Egypt F24	Futures	Clay	(Italy) Fabrizio Ornago	6–7^{(7–9)}, 6–4, 6–2
Loss	4–2	Sep 2017	Cairo Egypt F25	Futures	Clay	(France) Johan Tatlot	4–6, 4–6
Win	5–2	Oct 2017	Sharm El Sheikh Egypt F27	Futures	Hard	(Spain) David Pérez Sanz	6–3, 6–4
Loss	5–3	Oct 2017	Sharm El Sheikh Egypt F31	Futures	Hard	(Spain) Pablo Vivero González	4–6, 6–3, 2–6
Win	6–3	Aug 2018	Sintra Portugal F15	Futures	Hard	(Portugal) Frederico Ferreira Silva	4–6, 7–6^{(7–5)}, 7–5
Win	7–3	Dec 2018	Cairo Egypt F29	Futures	Clay	(France) Matthieu Perchicot	4–6, 6–2, 6–3
Win	8–3	Dec 2018	Cairo Egypt F31	Futures	Clay	(France) Matthieu Perchicot	6–3, 2–6, 6–0
Win	9–3	Mar 2019	M15 Sharm El Sheikh Egypt	World Tennis Tour	Hard	(Spain) Andrés Artuñedo	7–5, 6–3

=== Doubles: 6 (2-4) ===
Legend
ATP Challengers (0–0)
Futures / ITF World Tennis Tour (2–4)

Titles by surface
Hard (2–3)
Clay (0–1)
Grass (0–0)
Carpet (0–0)

Result	W–L	Date	Tournament	Tier	Surface	Partner	Opponents	Score
Loss	0–1	Dec 2016	Cairo Egypt F36	Futures	Clay	(Egypt) Mohamed Abdel-Aziz	(India) Chandril Sood (India) Lakshit Sood	1–6, 6–3, [6–10]
Loss	0–2	Apr 2017	Sharm El Sheikh Egypt F14	Futures	Hard	(Egypt) Issam Haitham Taweel	(Netherlands) Lennert van der Linden (Germany) George von Massow	3–6, 6–7^{(4–7)}
Win	1–2	Jul 2017	Sharm El Sheikh Egypt F18	Futures	Hard	(United States) Junior Alexander Ore	(Ukraine) Marat Deviatiarov (Egypt) Issam Haitham Taweel	6–2, 6–3
Loss	1–3	Oct 2017	Sharm El Sheikh Egypt F28	Futures	Hard	(Egypt) Mazen Osama	(Tunisia) Anis Ghorbel (Spain) David Pérez Sanz	3–6, 6–7^{(2–7)}
Win	2–3	Oct 2017	Sharm El Sheikh Egypt F30	Futures	Hard	(Tunisia) Anis Ghorbel	(Poland) Adrian Andrzejczuk (Spain) José Francisco Vidal Azorín	6–4, 4–2 ret.
Loss	2–4	Oct 2017	Sharm El Sheikh Egypt F31	Futures	Hard	(Italy) Antonio Massara	(Spain) David Jordà Sanchis (Brazil) João Menezes	3–6, 6–4, [8–10]

== See also ==
- Match fixing in tennis
- Tennis Integrity Unit
