= Haun Creek =

Stream in Kansas, U.S.

Coordinates: 38°45′05″N 96°39′00″W

Haun Creek is a stream in the U.S. state of Kansas. It is a tributary to the Neosho River.

Haun Creek was named after Reverend A. Haun, a pioneer citizen.
