= Thassilo Haun =

German tennis player

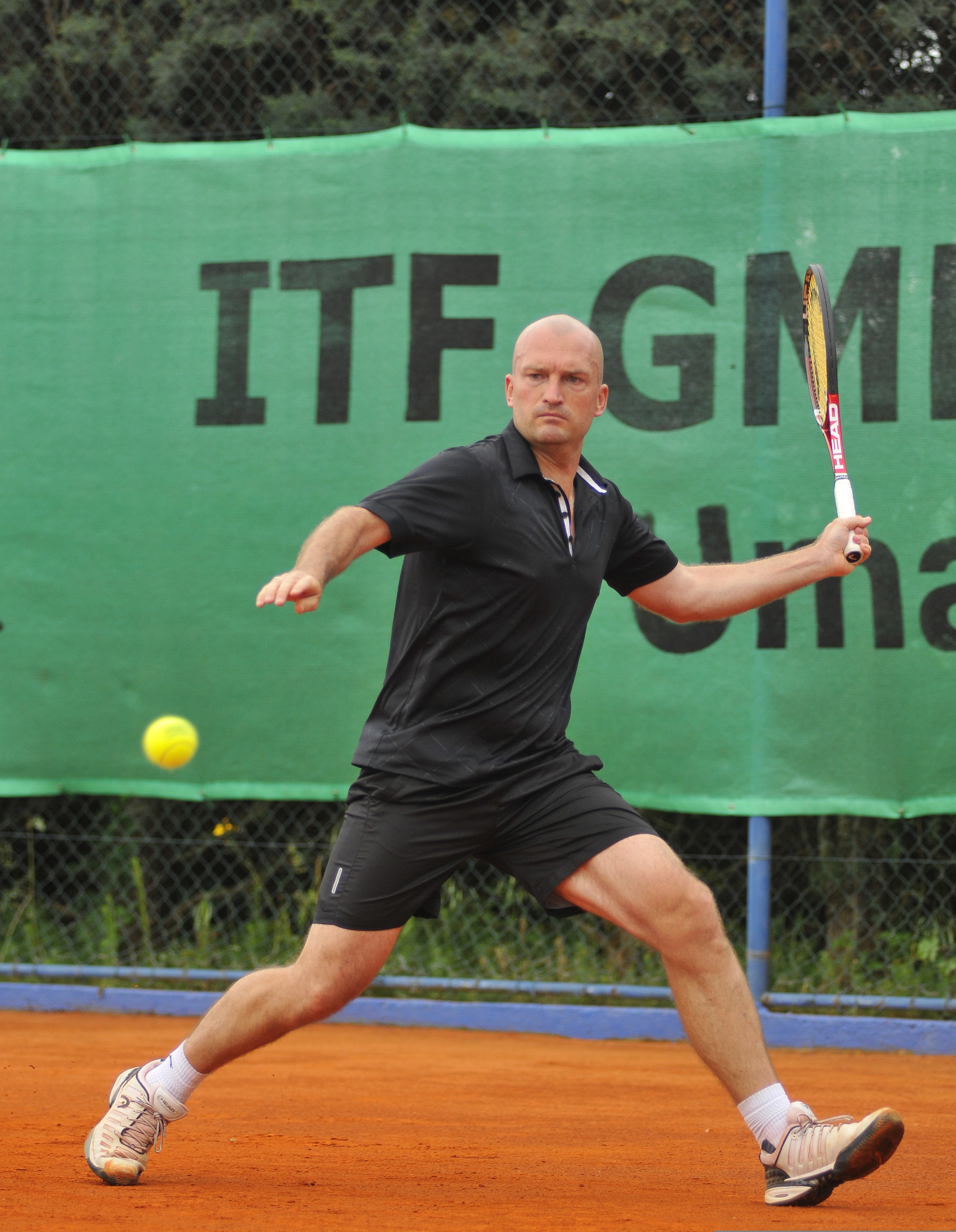
- Thassilo Haun in 2010
- Country (sports): Germany
- Born: 21 November 1973 (age 51); Saarbrücken, Germany
- Plays: Left-handed
- Prize money: $1,511

Singles
- Career record: 0–0 (at ATP Tour level, Grand Slam level, and in Davis Cup)
- Career titles: 0
- Highest ranking: No. 582 (26 August 1996)

Doubles
- Career record: 0–1 (at ATP Tour level, Grand Slam level, and in Davis Cup)
- Career titles: 0
- Highest ranking: No. 851 (11 November 1996)
- Last updated on: 20 February 2017.

Thassilo Haun (born 21 November 1973) is a retired German tennis player.

Haun has a career high ATP singles ranking of 582 achieved on 26 August 1996. He also has a career high ATP doubles ranking of 851 achieved on 11 November 1996.

Haun made his ATP main draw debut at the 2011 Austrian Open Kitzbühel in the doubles draw partnering Stefan Koubek.
