= Match fixing in tennis =

The issue of match fixing in tennis is an ongoing problem. First reported on by The Sunday Telegraph in 2003, an organisation called the Tennis Integrity Unit was set up in 2008 following an investigation into the problem. In 2011, Daniel Köllerer became the first player to receive a lifetime ban from the sport due to match fixing. Later that year, the organisers of the Wimbledon tournament were provided a list of people suspected of involvement in the issue. In 2016 the BBC reported on "evidence of widespread suspected match-fixing at the top level of world tennis, including at Wimbledon", and in February 2019 the BBC said that tennis was a "sport riddled with corruption".

In 2021 the International Governing Bodies of professional tennis established the International Tennis Integrity Agency as a further step to combat corruption in the sport.

== Examples ==
- In 2003, The Sunday Telegraph newspaper in London carried a front-page story entitled, "Tennis players are throwing matches for financial gain". Its investigations included references to numerous matches, including one that involved a top 10-ranked player. As a result of the Telegraph's investigations, "Internet odds exchange Betfair announce[d] that it signed a memorandum of understanding with the Association of Tennis Professionals (ATP)"
- In 2007, French tennis player Arnaud Clément claimed he was offered a bribe to fix a match, which he turned down, but added, "I won't say where or under what circumstances". Clément feared divulging more details on the bribe would have negative consequences on his career.
- In 2008, the Association of Tennis Professionals cleared Russian tennis player Nikolay Davydenko from allegations that he fixed a match against Martín Vassallo Argüello in Poland in 2007. In 2016, an investigation found that several millions of dollars were placed on the match from Russian-based accounts. Leaked files to the joint BuzzFeed and BBC investigators found 82 instances where Davydenko had sent or received text messages from the suspected head of an Italian sports betting syndicate.
- In January 2016, a joint BuzzFeed and BBC investigation reported alleged widespread match-fixing, which involve Northern Italian, Sicilian, and Russian betting syndicates, which included suspicious betting at major tournaments such as Wimbledon. The reporters examined betting incidents on a total of 26,000 matches.
- In June 2018, Argentinian tennis player Nicolás Kicker was banned from the sport for at least three years for match-fixing. According to an investigation by the Tennis Integrity Unit, Kicker knowingly participated in at least two fixed matches in 2015. The ruling prohibits Kicker from competing in or attending a sanctioned tennis match.
- In July 2018, Egyptian tennis player Karim Hossam received a lifetime ban for match fixing.
- In August 2019, Egyptian tennis player Issam Haitham Taweel was suspended for five years for match-fixing and other corruption offences.
- In September 2019, Brazilian tennis player Diego Matos received a lifetime ban for match fixing.
- In May 2020, Egyptian tennis player Youssef Hossam received a lifetime ban for match fixing, as his brother Karim had two years prior.
- In June 2021, Russian tennis player Yana Sizikova was arrested at Roland Garros after her French Open doubles first-round loss, amid a match fixing investigation from previous year's tournament. The prosecutor's office said her arrest was for "sports bribery and organized fraud for acts likely to have been committed in September 2020." The case was opened by a French police unit specializing in betting fraud and match-fixing, and centered on suspicions about one match at Roland Garros.
- In 2023, a large match-fixing ring in the lower levels of professional tennis, centered around gambling, was broken. At least 181 players were involved.

== See also ==
- International Tennis Federation
- ATP Tour
- ATP Challenger Tour
- WTA Tour
- International Tennis Integrity Agency
