= 2011 Austrian Open Kitzbühel =

- Date: 1–7 August
- Edition: 67th
- Category: ATP World Tour 250 series
- Surface: Clay
- Location: Kitzbühel
- Venue: Tennis stadium Kitzbühel

Champions

Singles
- (Netherlands) Robin Haase

Doubles
- (Italy) Daniele Bracciali / (Mexico) Santiago González
- Austrian Open Kitzbühel

The 2011 Bet-at-home Cup Kitzbühel was a men's tennis tournament played on outdoor clay courts. It was the 67th edition of the Austrian Open Kitzbühel, as part of the ATP World Tour 250 series of the 2011 ATP World Tour. It took place at the Tennis stadium Kitzbühel in Kitzbühel, Austria, from 1 August through 7 August 2011. It was demoted to the ATP Challenger in 2010, and made its return to the ATP World Tour in 2011.

== Finals ==
=== Singles ===
(Netherlands) Robin Haase defeated (Spain) Albert Montañés, 6–4, 4–6, 6–1

- It's the first title of the career for the Dutch player.

=== Doubles ===
(Italy) Daniele Bracciali / (Mexico) Santiago González defeated (Brazil) Franco Ferreiro / (Brazil) André Sá, 7–6^{(7–1)}, 4–6, [11–9]

== ATP entrants ==
=== Seeds ===
Country	Player	Ranking*	Seeding
ARG	Juan Ignacio Chela	21	1
ESP	Feliciano López	24	2
CRO	Ivan Ljubičić	32	3
ITA	Fabio Fognini	38	4
GER	Philipp Kohlschreiber	42	5
ITA	Andreas Seppi	44	6
ESP	Marcel Granollers	45	7
ESP	Pablo Andújar	47	8

*Seedings based on the July 25, 2011 rankings.

=== Other entrants ===
The following players received wildcards into the singles main draw:

- (Austria) Dominic Thiem
- (Austria) Thomas Muster
- (Spain) Javier Martí

The following players received entry from the qualifying draw:

- (Germany) Daniel Brands
- (Poland) Jerzy Janowicz
- (Brazil) João Souza
- (Croatia) Antonio Veić
