= Issam Haitham Taweel =

Egyptian tennis player

Issam Haitham Taweel عصام هيثم طويل
- Country (sports): Egypt
- Born: 10 July 1989 (age 35); Aleppo, Syria
- Height: 1.58 m (5 ft 2 in)
- Plays: Right Handed (Double Handed Backhand)
- Prize money: $55,698

Singles
- Career record: 2–5
- Career titles: 0
- Highest ranking: No. 635 (16 June 2014)

Doubles
- Career record: 0–2
- Career titles: 5 ITF
- Highest ranking: No. 393 (10 August 2015)
- Last updated on: 28 August 2017.

Issam Haitham Taweel (born 10 July 1989) is an Egyptian tennis player. Haitham Taweel began playing tennis at the age of 13. He has trained in Syria, Spain, United States and Egypt.

In August 2019, Taweel was suspended for five years for match-fixing and other corruption offences, after being investigated by the Tennis Integrity Unit and found guilty of all charges under the Tennis Anti-Corruption Program.

== See also ==
- Match fixing in tennis
- Syria Davis Cup team
