= Karim Hossam =

Egyptian tennis player

- Country (sports): Egypt
- Residence: Cairo, Egypt
- Born: 8 April 1994 (age 31) Giza, Egypt
- Retired: 3 July 2018 (banned)
- Plays: Right-handed (two-handed backhand)
- Prize money: $46,668

Singles
- Career record: 0–2 (at ATP Tour level, Grand Slam level, and in Davis Cup)
- Career titles: 0; 0 Challengers, 4 Futures
- Highest ranking: No. 337 (9 December 2013)

Doubles
- Career record: 0–0
- Career titles: 0
- Highest ranking: No. 592 (22 September 2014)
- Last updated on: 5 February 2019.

Karim Hossam (born 8 April 1994) is an Egyptian banned former professional tennis player. Hossam had a career-high ATP singles ranking of 337 achieved in September 2013. Hossam won 4 ITF events on the Futures circuit. He made his ATP main draw debut at the 2014 Qatar ExxonMobil Open, losing to the 5th seed Richard Gasquet 5–7, 1–6 in the first round. Hossam was banned from tennis for life and was fined $15,000 on 3 July 2018 for multiple match-fixing offences, after being found guilty on 16 corruption charges relating to offenses from 2013 to 2017 at ITF Futures tournaments. His younger brother Youssef Hossam was likewise banned from tennis for life, two years later, after he similarly was found guilty of 21 match-fixing and other corruption offences.

== See also ==
- Match fixing in tennis
