= João Souza =

Brazilian tennis player

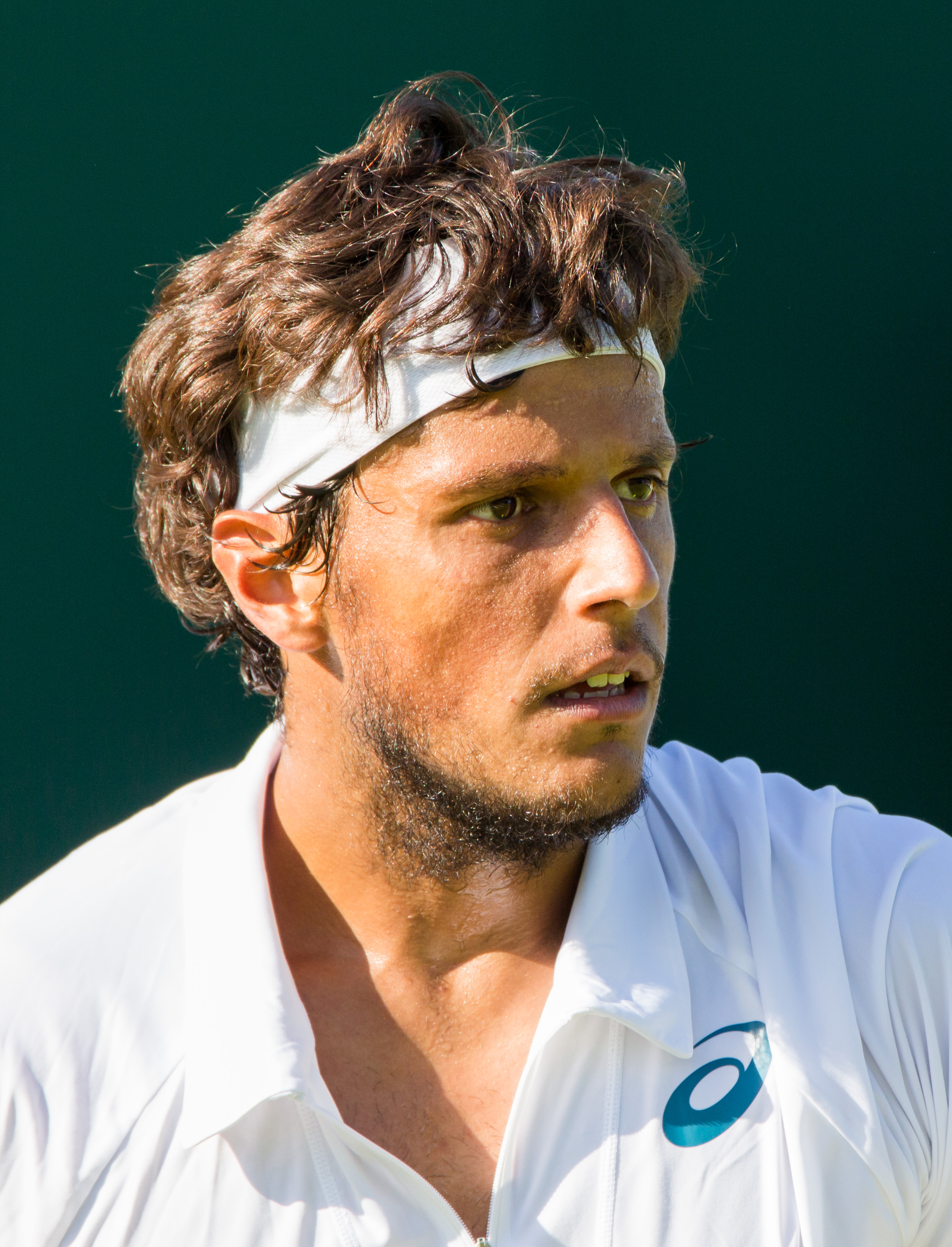
- Souza at the 2015 Wimbledon Championships
- Full name: João Olavo Soares de Souza
- Country (sports): Brazil
- Residence: Rio de Janeiro, Brazil
- Born: 27 May 1988 (age 37) Mogi das Cruzes, Brazil
- Height: 1.93 m (6 ft 4 in)
- Turned pro: 2006
- Retired: 2020 (Banned for life by the TIU)
- Plays: Right-handed (two-handed backhand)
- Coach: Andres Schneiter, Ricardo Acioly
- Prize money: US$ 1,324,103

Singles
- Career record: 27–50
- Career titles: 0
- Highest ranking: No. 69 (6 April 2015)

Grand Slam singles results
- Australian Open: 1R (2012, 2015)
- French Open: 1R (2012, 2015)
- Wimbledon: 1R (2015)
- US Open: 1R (2011, 2015)

Doubles
- Career record: 27–34
- Career titles: 0
- Highest ranking: No. 70 (7 January 2013)

Grand Slam doubles results
- Australian Open: 3R (2012)
- French Open: 1R (2015)
- Wimbledon: 1R (2015)
- US Open: 2R (2012)

João Olavo Soares de Souza (Portuguese pronunciation: [ʒuˈɐ̃w ˈso(w)zɐ]; born 27 May 1988) is a Brazilian former professional tennis player. Souza competed mainly on the ATP Challenger Tour, both in singles and doubles. He reached his highest ATP singles ranking of world No. 69 on 6 April 2015, and his highest doubles ranking of No. 70, on 7 January 2013. Souza is also known as "Feijão" (Portuguese for Bean). He received a lifetime ban for match-fixing in 2020.

== Career ==
In 2011, he qualified to the US Open, but was defeated in the first round by wildcard Robby Ginepri 3–6, 4–6, 7–6, 1–6.

In the 2014 season, Souza beat world No. 45, Robin Haase in round of 32 of the ATP 250 São Paulo. Later he reached semifinals at the Marburg, Scheveningen and Poznan Challengers. At the Medellin Challenger, he beat Facundo Bagnis in semifinals and lost to Austin Krajicek in the final. He reached semifinals at the Quito Challenger.

In 2015, he played in the longest singles match in Davis Cup history, losing to Leonardo Mayer in 6 hours and 42 minutes, 6–7^{(4)}, 6–7^{(5)}, 7–5, 7–5, 13–15.

In 2016, he won the 2016 International Tennis Tournament of Cortina on the ATP Challenger Tour, beating Laslo Djere in the final in straight sets.

In January 2020, the Tennis Integrity Unit announced that Souza had been issued a lifetime ban after conviction on match-fixing charges.

== ATP career finals ==
=== Doubles: 1 (1 runner-up) ===
Legend Grand Slam tournaments (0–0) ATP World Tour Masters 1000 (0–0) ATP World Tour 500 Series (0–0) ATP World Tour 250 Series (0–1)	Finals by surface Hard (0–0) Clay (0–1) Grass (0–0) Carpet (0–0)

Result	W–L	Date	Tournament	Surface	Partner	Opponents	Score
Loss	0–1	Feb 2015	Ecuador Open	Clay	(Dominican Republic) Víctor Estrella Burgos	(Germany) Gero Kretschmer (Germany) Alexander Satschko	5–7, 6–7^{(3)}

== Futures & Challenger finals ==
=== Singles: 22 (14–8) ===
Legend
Challengers (9–7)
Futures (5–1)

Outcome	No.	Date	Tournament	Surface	Opponent	Score
Runner-up	1.	30 October 2006	São Paulo, Brazil	Clay	(Argentina) Juán-Pablo Villar	6–7^{(5)}, 6–7^{(6)}
Winner	1.	7 May 2007	São Paulo, Brazil	Clay	(Brazil) André Miele	6–3, 6–2
Winner	2.	26 November 2007	Santos, Brazil	Clay	(Argentina) Juán-Pablo Villar	6–1, 6–2
Winner	3.	3 December 2007	Fortaleza, Brazil	Clay	(Argentina) Juán-Pablo Villar	6–4, 2–0 ret.
Winner	4.	28 January 2008	Bucaramanga, Colombia	Clay	(Colombia) Juan Sebastián Cabal	4–6, 6–2, 6–2
Winner	5.	17 November 2008	Bauru, Brazil	Clay	(Argentina) Gastón Giussani	7–6^{(7)}, 7–6^{(3)}
Runner-up	2.	2 November 2009	Medellín, Colombia	Clay	(Argentina) Juan Ignacio Chela	4–6, 6–4, 4–6
Winner	6.	12 April 2010	Bogotá, Colombia	Clay	(Colombia) Alejandro Falla	4–6, 6–4, 6–1
Winner	7.	26 September 2010	Bogotá, Colombia	Clay	(Morocco) Reda El Amrani	6–4, 7–6^{(5)}
Runner-up	3.	10 October 2010	Quito, Ecuador	Clay	(Ecuador) Giovanni Lapentti	6–2, 3–6, 4–6
Winner	8.	24 April 2011	Santos, Brazil	Clay	(Argentina) Diego Junqueira	6–4, 6–2
Runner-up	4.	16 May 2011	Zagreb, Croatia	Clay	(Argentina) Diego Junqueira	3–6, 4–6
Winner	9.	16 September 2012	Cali, Colombia	Clay	(Brazil) Thiago Alves	6–2, 6–4
Winner	10.	7 October 2012	Quito, Ecuador	Clay	(France) Guillaume Rufin	6–2, 7–6^{(4)}
Winner	11.	13 October 2013	São Paulo, Brazil	Clay	(Colombia) Alejandro González	7–6, 6–3
Winner	12.	5 January 2014	São Paulo, Brazil	Hard	(Colombia) Alejandro González	6–4, 6–4
Runner-up	5.	7 September 2014	Medellín, Colombia	Clay	(United States) Austin Krajicek	5–7, 3–6
Runner-up	6.	28 September 2014	Pereira, Colombia	Clay	(Dominican Republic) Víctor Estrella Burgos	6–7^{(5)}, 6–3, 6–7^{(6)}
Runner-up	7.	10 October 2014	San Juan, Argentina	Clay	(Argentina) Diego Schwartzman	6–7^{(5)}, 3–6
Runner-up	8.	3 April 2016	León, Mexico	Hard	(Germany) Michael Berrer	3–6, 2–6
Winner	13.	7 August 2016	Cortina d'Ampezzo, Italy	Clay	(Serbia) Laslo Djere	6–4, 7–6^{(4)}
Winner	14.	14 August 2016	Fano, Italy	Clay	(Argentina) Nicolás Kicker	6–4, 6–7^{(12)}, 6–2

=== Doubles: 22 (11–11) ===
Legend
Challengers (5–6)
Futures (6–5)

Outcome	No.	Date	Tournament	Surface	Partner	Opponents	Score
Runner-up	1.	19 June 2006	Sorocaba, Brazil	Clay	(Brazil) Marcelo Melo	(Brazil) Alexandre Bonatto (Brazil) Franco Ferreiro	6–4, 5–7, 6–3
Runner-up	2.	16 October 2006	Londrina, Brazil	Clay	(Brazil) André Miele	(Brazil) Leonardo Kirche (Brazil) Caio Zampieri	3–6, 6–2, 7–6^{(1)}
Runner-up	3.	30 October 2006	São Paulo, Brazil	Clay	(Brazil) André Miele	(Hungary) György Balázs (Hungary) Kornél Bardóczky	6–4, 6–2
Winner	1.	20 November 2006	Criciúma, Brazil	Clay	(Brazil) André Miele	(Ecuador) Carlos Avellán (Brazil) Tiago Lopes	6–4, 6–4
Winner	2.	27 November 2006	Uruguaiana, Brazil	Clay	(Brazil) André Miele	(Brazil) Tiago Lopes (Brazil) Caio Zampieri	7–6^{(5)}, 6–2
Runner-up	4.	23 April 2007	Florianópolis, Brazil	Clay	(Brazil) André Miele	(Uruguay) Pablo Cuevas (Argentina) Horacio Zeballos	6–4, 6–4
Runner-up	5.	7 May 2007	São Paulo, Brazil	Clay	(Brazil) André Miele	(Brazil) Henrique Pinto-Silva (Brazil) Gabriel Pitta	6–4, 6–4
Runner-up	6.	14 May 2007	Caldas Novas, Brazil	Clay	(Brazil) André Miele	(Brazil) Renato Silveira (Brazil) Caio Zampieri	6–4, 6–7, 6–1
Winner	3.	21 May 2007	Chapecó, Brazil	Clay	(Brazil) André Miele	(Brazil) Thomaz Bellucci (Brazil) Caio Burjaili	2–6, 6–2, 6–2
Winner	4.	29 October 2007	Itu, Brazil	Clay	(Brazil) André Miele	(Brazil) Raony Carvalho (Brazil) Rodrigo Grilli	2–6, 6–4, [10–7]
Winner	5.	3 December 2007	Fortaleza, Brazil	Clay	(Brazil) André Pinheiro	(Brazil) Henrique Pinto-Silva (Brazil) Gabriel Pitta	w/o
Winner	6.	21 January 2008	Manizales, Colombia	Clay	(Brazil) André Miele	(Italy) Matteo Marrai (Italy) Walter Trusendi	6–4, 6–4
Runner-up	7.	29 September 2008	Aracaju, Brazil	Clay	(Brazil) Thiago Alves	(Argentina) Juan-Martín Aranguren (Brazil) Franco Ferreiro	6–4, 6–4
Runner-up	8.	13 April 2009	Mexico City	Hard	(Dominican Republic) Víctor Estrella Burgos	(Thailand) Sanchai Ratiwatana (Thailand) Sonchat Ratiwatana	6–3, 6–3
Winner	7.	27 April 2009	Pereira, Colombia	Clay	(Dominican Republic) Víctor Estrella Burgos	(Colombia) Juan Sebastián Cabal (Colombia) Alejandro Falla	6–4, 6–4
Runner-up	9.	14 September 2009	Cali, Colombia	Clay	(Brazil) Ricardo Hocevar	(Argentina) Sebastián Prieto (Argentina) Horacio Zeballos	4–6, 6–3, [10–5]
Runner-up	10.	15 September 2012	Cali, Colombia	Clay	(Brazil) Marcelo Demoliner	(Colombia) Juan Sebastián Cabal (Colombia) Robert Farah	3–6, 6–7^{(4)}
Winner	8.	23 September 2012	Campinas, Brazil	Clay	(Brazil) Marcelo Demoliner	(Uruguay) Marcel Felder (Argentina) Máximo González	6–1, 7–5
Runner-up	11.	7 October 2012	Quito, Ecuador	Clay	(Brazil) Marcelo Demoliner	(Colombia) Juan Sebastián Cabal (Colombia) Carlos Salamanca	6–7^{(7)}, 6–7^{(4)}
Winner	9.	20 October 2012	Rio de Janeiro, Brazil	Clay	(Brazil) Marcelo Demoliner	(Portugal) Frederico Gil (Portugal) Pedro Sousa	6–2, 6–4
Winner	10.	27 October 2012	Porto Alegre, Brazil	Clay	(Brazil) Marcelo Demoliner	(Germany) Simon Greul (Italy) Alessandro Motti	6–3, 3–6, [10–7]
Winner	11.	9 March 2013	Santiago, Chile	Clay	(Brazil) Marcelo Demoliner	(Argentina) Federico Delbonis (Argentina) Diego Junqueira	7–5, 6–1

== Singles performance timeline ==
Key
W	F	SF	QF	#R	RR	Q#	DNQ	A	NH

(W) winner; (F) finalist; (SF) semifinalist; (QF) quarterfinalist; (#R) rounds 4, 3, 2, 1; (RR) round-robin stage; (Q#) qualification round; (DNQ) did not qualify; (A) absent; (NH) not held; (SR) strike rate (events won / competed); (W–L) win–loss record.

Current till 2016 US Open.

Tournament	2008	2009	2010	2011	2012	2013	2014	2015	2016	W–L
Grand Slam tournaments
Australian Open	A	A	A	Q1	1R	A	A	1R	A	0–2
French Open	Q2	Q1	Q2	Q2	1R	Q2	Q1	1R	Q1	0–2
Wimbledon	Q1	Q1	Q1	A	A	A	Q1	1R	A	0–1
US Open	Q1	Q1	Q1	1R	Q1	Q2	Q1	1R	Q2	0–2
Win–loss	0–0	0–0	0–0	0–1	0–2	0–0	0–0	0–4	0–0	0–7

== See also ==
- Match fixing in tennis
- Tennis Integrity Unit
