= Daniele Bracciali =

Italian tennis player

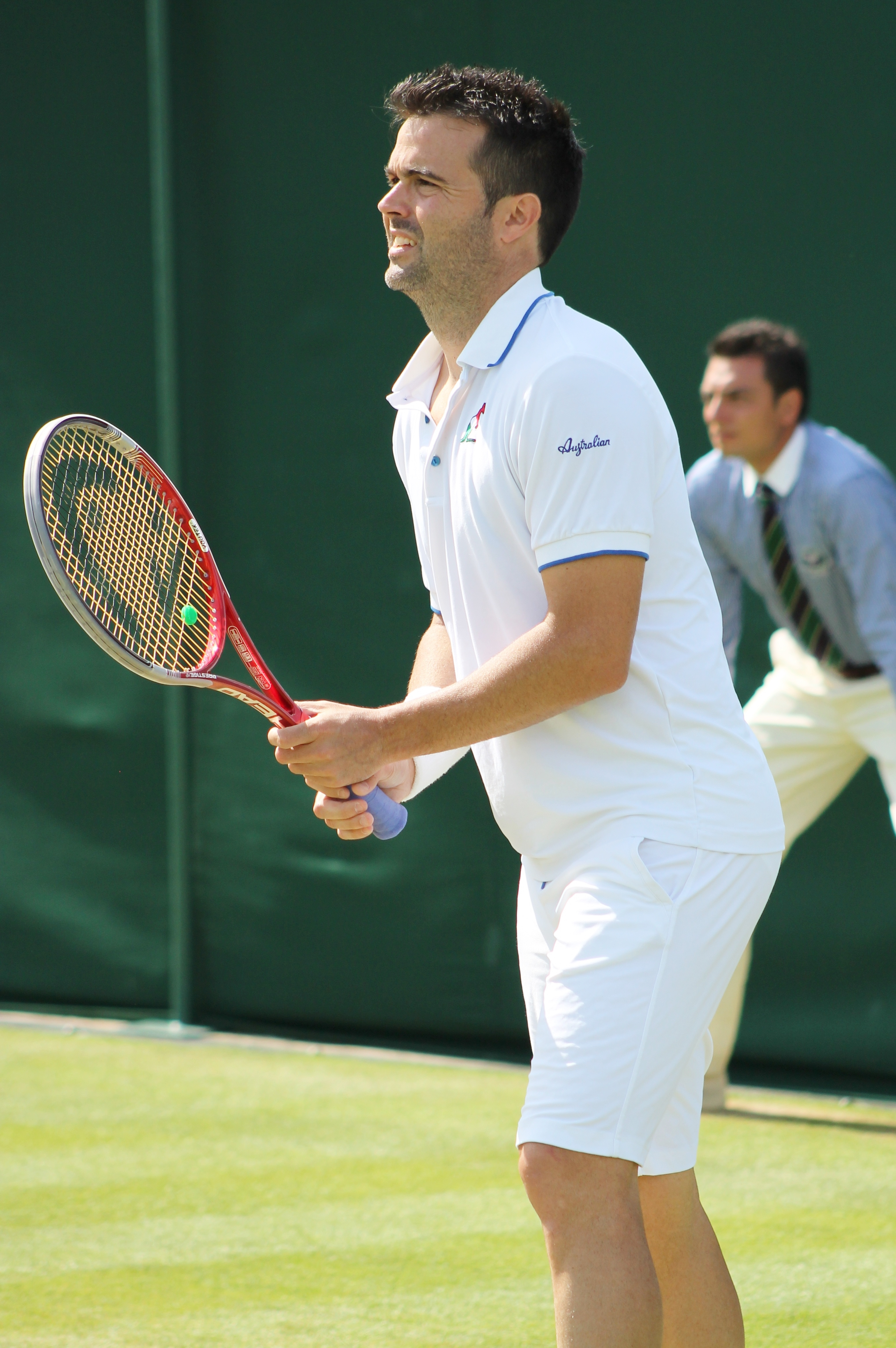
- Country (sports): Italy
- Residence: Arezzo, Italy
- Born: 10 January 1978 (age 47); Arezzo, Italy
- Height: 1.80 m (5 ft 11 in)
- Turned pro: 1995
- Retired: 2015–2017 (banned); 2018 (banned)
- Plays: Right-handed (one-handed backhand)
- Prize money: $1,831,148

Singles
- Career record: 35–55
- Career titles: 1
- Highest ranking: No. 49 (8 May 2006)

Grand Slam singles results
- Australian Open: 2R (2006)
- French Open: 1R (2005, 2006, 2007)
- Wimbledon: 3R (1998, 2006)
- US Open: 1R (2005, 2006)

Doubles
- Career record: 153–153
- Career titles: 6
- Highest ranking: No. 21 (11 June 2012)

Grand Slam doubles results
- Australian Open: QF (2013)
- French Open: SF (2012)
- Wimbledon: QF (2012)
- US Open: 3R (2011)

Grand Slam mixed doubles results
- Australian Open: SF (2012)
- French Open: SF (2012)
- Wimbledon: 3R (2012)
- US Open: 2R (2012)
- Last updated on: 22 February 2020.

Daniele Bracciali (Italian pronunciation: [daˈnjɛːle bratˈtʃaːli]; born 10 January 1978) is an Italian former tennis player, best ranked world no. 21 in doubles. His career-high ATP singles ranking is world no. 49, achieved in May 2006. In doubles, he reached the semifinals of the 2012 French Open and the quarterfinals of the 2013 Australian Open. In mixed doubles, he reached the semifinals of the 2012 Australian and French Opens.

He was banned by the Italian Tennis Federation in 2015 for betting and did not play for several years, but returned in 2017. In November 2018, Bracciali was once again given a life ban having been found guilty by the Tennis Integrity Unit.

== Career ==
Bracciali won his only ATP singles title in April 2006, at Casablanca, on clay. In the final he beat Nicolás Massú.

In his career, Bracciali has won a total of seven matches at Grand Slam tournaments, six at Wimbledon and one at the Australian Open. In 1998 and 2006, he reached the third round of Wimbledon, his best Grand Slam results. In the first round of Wimbledon in 2005, he defeated Ivo Karlović in five sets after surviving 51 aces from the Croat. He then took Andy Roddick, the previous year's runner-up (and eventual runner-up that year as well), to five sets.

=== 2012 ===
Recently, Bracciali has played primarily doubles. He has won five ATP titles. In 2012, he reached the third round of the 2012 Australian Open partnering Potito Starace. They were beaten by Max Mirnyi and Daniel Nestor. Later that year at the French Open, they reached their first semifinal. They were defeated again by the eventual champions, Max Mirnyi and Daniel Nestor. At Wimbledon, Bracciali partnered the Austrian veteran Julian Knowle and met Mirnyi and Nestor again in the second round. This was the first time that Bracciali won against them. Bracciali and Knowle lost in the quarterfinals to Robert Lindstedt and Horia Tecău.

Bracciali also partnered Roberta Vinci in mixed doubles at the 2012 Australian Open. Entering the draw as an alternate, they reached the semifinals. They lost to the fifth seeds Elena Vesnina and Leander Paes after they took the first set. At the French Open, Bracciali partnered Galina Voskoboeva. They reached the semifinals of the tournament, but lost to the eventual champions Sania Mirza and Mahesh Bhupathi. At Wimbledon, Bracciali teamed up again with Vinci and reached the third round. He played with Vinci at the 2012 Summer Olympics, and with Andreas Seppi in men's doubles at the same event.

=== 2013 ===
In 2013, he reached the quarterfinals of the Australian Open in men's doubles partnering Lukáš Dlouhý. They lost to the Bryan brothers in straight sets.

== Betting scandal ==
Following Alessio di Mauro's nine-month ban for betting on matches in November 2007, Bracciali and Potito Starace were each fined and given short suspensions from playing. Bracciali received a fine of £14,300 and a three-month ban from January 1, 2008.

July and November 2007 interceptions between a businessman, Manlio Bruni, and Bracciali were found and they were extensively talking about gaining 50,000 euros each for a set won or lost depending on the match Bracciali was playing. The interceptions were published by several Italian tennis magazines.

In 2015, the Italian Tennis Federation gave Bracciali and Starace a lifelong ban. After a long process, in autumn 2016 ATP confirmed the 2 years suspension, allows the players to play national events. In January 2018, the lifelong suspension was cancelled after absolution of both players. Bracciali came back on court in June 2018, but was once more banned, this time for life, in November of that year and was also fined $250,000.

== ATP career finals ==
=== Singles: 1 (1 title) ===
Legend Grand Slam tournaments (0–0) Tennis Masters Cup / ATP World Tour Finals (0–0) ATP Masters Series / ATP World Tour Masters 1000 (0–0) ATP International Series Gold / ATP World Tour 500 Series (0–0) ATP International Series / ATP World Tour 250 Series (1–0)	Titles by surface Hard (0–0) Clay (1–0) Grass (0–0)	Titles by setting Outdoor (1–0) Indoor (0–0)

Result	W–L	Date	Tournament	Tier	Surface	Opponent	Score
Win	1–0	Apr 2006	Grand Prix Hassan II, Morocco	International	Clay	(Chile) Nicolás Massú	6–1, 6–4

=== Doubles: 13 (6 titles, 7 runner-ups) ===
Legend Grand Slam tournaments (0–0) Tennis Masters Cup / ATP World Tour Finals (0–0) ATP Masters Series / ATP World Tour Masters 1000 (0–0) ATP International Series Gold / ATP World Tour 500 Series (0–0) ATP International Series / ATP World Tour 250 Series (6–7)	Titles by surface Hard (1–1) Clay (3–4) Grass (1–1) Carpet (1–1)	Titles by setting Outdoor (4–6) Indoor (2–1)

Result	W–L	Date	Tournament	Tier	Surface	Partner	Opponents	Score
Loss	0–1	Feb 2004	Milan Indoor, Italy	International	Carpet (i)	(Italy) Giorgio Galimberti	(United States) Jared Palmer (Czech Republic) Pavel Vízner	4–6, 4–6
Win	1–1	Feb 2005	Milan Indoor, Italy	International	Carpet (i)	(Italy) Giorgio Galimberti	(France) Arnaud Clément (France) Jean-François Bachelot	6–7^{(8–10)}, 7–6^{(8–6)}, 6–4
Win	2–1	Oct 2010	St. Petersburg Open, Russia	250 Series	Hard (i)	(Italy) Potito Starace	(India) Rohan Bopanna (Pakistan) Aisam-ul-Haq Qureshi	7–6^{(8–6)}, 7–6^{(7–5)}
Loss	2–2	Jan 2011	Qatar Open, Qatar	250 Series	Hard	(Italy) Andreas Seppi	(Spain) Marc López (Spain) Rafael Nadal	3–6, 6–7^{(4–7)}
Win	3–2	Jun 2011	Rosmalen Championships, Netherlands	250 Series	Grass	(Czech Republic) František Čermák	(Sweden) Robert Lindstedt (Romania) Horia Tecău	6–3, 2–6, [10–8]
Win	4–2	Aug 2011	Austrian Open Kitzbühel, Austria	250 Series	Clay	(Mexico) Santiago González	(Brazil) Franco Ferreiro (Brazil) André Sá	7–6^{(7–1)}, 4–6, [11–9]
Win	5–2	Sep 2011	Romanian Open, Romania	250 Series	Clay	(Italy) Potito Starace	(Austria) Julian Knowle (Spain) David Marrero	3–6, 6–4, [10–8]
Loss	5–3	Apr 2012	Grand Prix Hassan II, Morocco	250 Series	Clay	(Italy) Fabio Fognini	(Germany) Dustin Brown (Australia) Paul Hanley	5–7, 3–6
Loss	5–4	Oct 2012	Kremlin Cup, Russia	250 Series	Clay	(Italy) Simone Bolelli	(Czech Republic) František Čermák (Slovakia) Michal Mertiňák	5–7, 3–6
Loss	5–5	Jun 2013	Halle Open, Germany	250 Series	Grass	(Israel) Jonathan Erlich	(Mexico) Santiago González (United States) Scott Lipsky	2–6, 6–7^{(3–7)}
Loss	5–6	Aug 2014	Austrian Open Kitzbühel, Austria	250 Series	Clay	(Kazakhstan) Andrey Golubev	(Finland) Henri Kontinen (Finland) Jarkko Nieminen	1–6, 4–6
Win	6–6	Jul 2018	Swiss Open, Switzerland	250 Series	Clay	(Italy) Matteo Berrettini	(Ukraine) Denys Molchanov (Slovakia) Igor Zelenay	7–6^{(7–2)}, 7–6^{(7–5)}
Loss	5–7	Aug 2018	Austrian Open Kitzbühel, Austria	250 Series	Clay	(Argentina) Federico Delbonis	(Czech Republic) Roman Jebavý (Argentina) Andrés Molteni	2–6, 4–6

== Performance timelines ==
Key
W	F	SF	QF	#R	RR	Q#	DNQ	A	NH

(W) winner; (F) finalist; (SF) semifinalist; (QF) quarterfinalist; (#R) rounds 4, 3, 2, 1; (RR) round-robin stage; (Q#) qualification round; (DNQ) did not qualify; (A) absent; (NH) not held; (SR) strike rate (events won / competed); (W–L) win–loss record.

=== Singles ===
Tournament	1998	1999	2000	2001	2002	2003	2004	2005	2006	2007	SR	W–L
Grand Slam tournaments
Australian Open	A	A	A	A	A	A	A	1R	2R	1R	0 / 3	1–3
French Open	A	A	A	A	A	A	A	1R	1R	1R	0 / 3	0–3
Wimbledon	3R	A	A	A	A	A	2R	2R	3R	Q3	0 / 4	6–4
US Open	A	A	A	A	A	A	A	1R	1R	A	0 / 2	0–2
Win–loss	2–1	0–0	0–0	0–0	0–0	0–0	1–1	1–4	3–4	0–2	0 / 12	7–12

=== Doubles ===
Current through the 2018 Kremlin Cup.

Tournament	1996	1997	1998	1999	2000	2001	2002	2003	2004	2005	2006	2007	2008	2009	2010	2011	2012	2013	2014	2015	2016	2017	2018	SR	W–L
Grand Slam tournaments
Australian Open	A	A	A	A	A	A	A	A	A	A	1R	1R	A	A	A	3R	3R	QF	2R	1R	A	A	A	0 / 7	8–7
French Open	A	A	A	A	A	A	A	A	A	1R	1R	1R	A	A	3R	QF	SF	1R	1R	A	A	A	3R	0 / 9	11–9
Wimbledon	A	A	A	A	A	A	A	A	1R	1R	2R	A	A	A	1R	2R	QF	1R	1R	A	A	A	1R	0 / 9	5–9
US Open	A	A	A	A	A	A	A	A	A	2R	2R	A	A	A	2R	3R	1R	2R	2R	A	A	A	1R	0 / 8	7–8
Win–loss	0–0	0–0	0–0	0–0	0–0	0–0	0–0	0–0	0–1	1–3	2–4	0–2	0–0	0–0	3–3	8–4	9–4	4–4	2–4	0–1	0–0	0–0	2–3	0 / 33	31–33
Career statistics
Titles / Finals	0 / 0	0 / 0	0 / 0	0 / 0	0 / 0	0 / 0	0 / 0	0 / 0	0 / 1	1 / 1	0 / 0	0 / 0	0 / 0	0 / 0	1 / 1	3 / 4	0 / 2	0 / 1	0 / 1	0 / 0	0 / 0	0 / 0	1 / 2	6 / 13	
Overall win–loss	0–1	0–0	0–0	0–0	0–0	0–1	1–0	0–0	4–4	16–9	6–17	4–6	0–0	1–1	10–5	31–21	36–28	18–30	17–22	0–1	0–0	0–0	9–7	153–153	
Year-end ranking	1044	1091	614	370	326	277	158	173	91	73	147	323	837	99	58	30	24	57	59	N/A	N/A	N/A		50%	

== See also ==
- Match fixing in tennis
- Tennis Integrity Unit
