= 2014 ITF Men's Circuit (April–June) =

This article includes the 2014 ITF Men's Circuit tournaments which occurred between April and June 2014.

== Point distribution ==
Tournament Category	W	F	SF	QF	R16	R32
Futures 15,000+H	35	20	10	4	1	0
Futures 15,000	27	15	8	3	1	0
Futures 10,000+H	27	15	8	3	1	0
Futures 10,000	18	10	6	2	1	0

== Key ==
$15,000 tournaments
$10,000 tournaments

== Month ==
=== April ===
Week of	Tournament	Winner	Runners-up	Semifinalists	Quarterfinalists
April 7	Algeria F2 Futures; Algiers, Algeria; Clay $15,000	(Serbia) Peđa Krstin; 6–7^{(6–8)}, 6–2, 6–2	(Italy) Matteo Marrai	(Belgium) Yannick Vandenbulcke (France) Laurent Rochette	(Belgium) Germain Gigounon (Portugal) André Gaspar Murta (Spain) Pol Toledo Bagué (France) Samuel Bensoussan
April 7	Algeria F2 Futures; Algiers, Algeria; Clay $15,000	(Belgium) Julien Dubail (Belgium) Germain Gigounon; 6–3, 6–4	(Spain) Pol Toledo Bagué (Spain) Marc García Roman	(Belgium) Yannick Vandenbulcke (France) Laurent Rochette	(Belgium) Germain Gigounon (Portugal) André Gaspar Murta (Spain) Pol Toledo Bagué (France) Samuel Bensoussan
April 7	Australia F5 Futures; Glen Iris, Australia; Clay $15,000	(Australia) Luke Saville; 4–6, 7–6^{(7–4)}, 6–4	(Australia) Alex Bolt	(Australia) Omar Jasika (Australia) Dane Propoggia	(Australia) Maverick Banes (Australia) Jordan Thompson (Australia) Oliver Ceranic (Australia) Li Tu
April 7	Australia F5 Futures; Glen Iris, Australia; Clay $15,000	(Australia) James Lemke (Australia) Dane Propoggia; 6–1, 6–3	(Australia) Daniel Ferretti (Australia) Aaron Leeder-Chard	(Australia) Omar Jasika (Australia) Dane Propoggia	(Australia) Maverick Banes (Australia) Jordan Thompson (Australia) Oliver Ceranic (Australia) Li Tu
April 7	China F4 Futures; Chengdu, China; Hard $15,000	(China) Wu Di; 6–4, 6–2	(Croatia) Borna Ćorić	(Japan) Yasutaka Uchiyama (Japan) Hiroki Kondo	(Chinese Taipei) Huang Liang-chi (Spain) Roberto Ortega Olmedo (Australia) John Millman (China) Zhang Ze
April 7	China F4 Futures; Chengdu, China; Hard $15,000	(China) Gong Maoxin (China) Li Zhe; 6–3, 6–4	(Chinese Taipei) Huang Liang-chi (Chinese Taipei) Hung Jui-chen	(Japan) Yasutaka Uchiyama (Japan) Hiroki Kondo	(Chinese Taipei) Huang Liang-chi (Spain) Roberto Ortega Olmedo (Australia) John Millman (China) Zhang Ze
April 7	USA F11 Futures; Little Rock, United States; Hard $15,000	(Serbia) Filip Krajinović; 6–1, 7–6^{(7–3)}	(United Kingdom) Daniel Smethurst	(United States) Stefan Kozlov (Bulgaria) Dimitar Kutrovsky	(United States) Jason Jung (United States) Kyle McMorrow (United States) Mico Santiago (United States) Chris Wettengel
April 7	USA F11 Futures; Little Rock, United States; Hard $15,000	(United States) Jean-Yves Aubone (United States) Eric Quigley; 6–2, 6–4	(United States) Kyle McMorrow (South Africa) Tucker Vorster	(United States) Stefan Kozlov (Bulgaria) Dimitar Kutrovsky	(United States) Jason Jung (United States) Kyle McMorrow (United States) Mico Santiago (United States) Chris Wettengel
April 7	Croatia F7 Futures; Pula, Croatia; Clay $10,000	(Spain) Íñigo Cervantes Huegun; 5–7, 7–5, 6–1	(Italy) Matteo Trevisan	(Belarus) Uladzimir Ignatik (France) Laurent Lokoli	(Serbia) Laslo Djere (Germany) Kevin Krawietz (Croatia) Nikola Mektić (Croatia) Antonio Šančić
April 7	Croatia F7 Futures; Pula, Croatia; Clay $10,000	(Italy) Daniele Giorgini (Italy) Matteo Volante; 6–2, 6–2	(Croatia) Toni Androić (Croatia) Ivan Blažević	(Belarus) Uladzimir Ignatik (France) Laurent Lokoli	(Serbia) Laslo Djere (Germany) Kevin Krawietz (Croatia) Nikola Mektić (Croatia) Antonio Šančić
April 7	Egypt F13 Futures; Sharm El Sheikh, Egypt; Clay $10,000	(Sweden) Elias Ymer; 7–5, 6–4	(France) Gleb Sakharov	(North Macedonia) Tomislav Jotovski (Poland) Błażej Koniusz	(France) Jérôme Inzerillo (Portugal) Vasco Mensurado (Germany) Steven Moneke (Sweden) Jonathan Mridha
April 7	Egypt F13 Futures; Sharm El Sheikh, Egypt; Clay $10,000	(Poland) Andriej Kapaś (Poland) Błażej Koniusz; 6–4, 7–5	(Italy) Francesco Garzelli (Czech Republic) Libor Salaba	(North Macedonia) Tomislav Jotovski (Poland) Błażej Koniusz	(France) Jérôme Inzerillo (Portugal) Vasco Mensurado (Germany) Steven Moneke (Sweden) Jonathan Mridha
April 7	Greece F5 Futures; Heraklion, Greece; Hard $10,000	(Venezuela) Ricardo Rodríguez; 3–6, 7–6^{(8–6)}, 6–2	(France) Sébastien Boltz	(Slovakia) Adrian Sikora (Spain) Carlos Gómez-Herrera	(Germany) Moritz Baumann (Czech Republic) Václav Šafránek (France) Tristan Lamasine (Spain) Jorge Hernando Ruano
April 7	Greece F5 Futures; Heraklion, Greece; Hard $10,000	(France) Grégoire Barrère (France) Tristan Lamasine; 7–6^{(7–4)}, 6–2	(Czech Republic) Marek Jaloviec (Czech Republic) Václav Šafránek	(Slovakia) Adrian Sikora (Spain) Carlos Gómez-Herrera	(Germany) Moritz Baumann (Czech Republic) Václav Šafránek (France) Tristan Lamasine (Spain) Jorge Hernando Ruano
April 7	Italy F9 Futures; Santa Margherita di Pula, Italy; Clay $10,000	(Italy) Stefano Travaglia; 7–6^{(7–4)}, 6–3	(Spain) Oriol Roca Batalla	(Spain) Jordi Samper Montaña (Italy) Edoardo Eremin	(Italy) Matteo Fago (Italy) Matteo Donati (Italy) Enrico Burzi (Italy) Gianluca Mager
April 7	Italy F9 Futures; Santa Margherita di Pula, Italy; Clay $10,000	(Italy) Francesco Borgo (Italy) Stefano Travaglia; 6–4, 7–6^{(7–5)}	(Spain) Oriol Roca Batalla (Spain) David Vega Hernández	(Spain) Jordi Samper Montaña (Italy) Edoardo Eremin	(Italy) Matteo Fago (Italy) Matteo Donati (Italy) Enrico Burzi (Italy) Gianluca Mager
April 7	Kazakhstan F5 Futures; Shymkent, Kazakhstan; Clay $10,000	(Georgia (country)) Aleksandre Metreveli; 6–4, 6–3	(Slovakia) Filip Horanský	(Spain) David Estruch (Russia) Aleksandr Lobkov	(Russia) Mikhail Biryukov (Estonia) Vladimir Ivanov (Russia) Andrei Plotniy (Belarus) Yaraslav Shyla
April 7	Kazakhstan F5 Futures; Shymkent, Kazakhstan; Clay $10,000	(Belarus) Yaraslav Shyla (Belarus) Andrei Vasilevski; 6–2, 6–2	(Ukraine) Dmytro Badanov (Russia) Yan Sabanin	(Spain) David Estruch (Russia) Aleksandr Lobkov	(Russia) Mikhail Biryukov (Estonia) Vladimir Ivanov (Russia) Andrei Plotniy (Belarus) Yaraslav Shyla
April 7	Qatar F2 Futures; Doha, Qatar; Hard $10,000	(Switzerland) Adrien Bossel; 6–4, 6–1	(United Kingdom) Oliver Golding	(Sweden) Patrik Rosenholm (United Kingdom) Liam Broady	(France) Antoine Benneteau (United Kingdom) Ashley Hewitt (Croatia) Matija Pecotić (Chinese Taipei) Chen Ti
April 7	Qatar F2 Futures; Doha, Qatar; Hard $10,000	(Chinese Taipei) Chen Ti (South Africa) Ruan Roelofse; 6–4, 6–3	(United Kingdom) Luke Bambridge (France) Antoine Benneteau	(Sweden) Patrik Rosenholm (United Kingdom) Liam Broady	(France) Antoine Benneteau (United Kingdom) Ashley Hewitt (Croatia) Matija Pecotić (Chinese Taipei) Chen Ti
April 7	Turkey F11 Futures; Antalya-Belconti, Turkey; Hard $10,000	(Austria) Bastian Trinker; 6–7^{(1–7)}, 6–4, 6–4	(Austria) Maximilian Neuchrist	(Slovakia) Karol Beck (France) Julien Obry	(France) Rémi Boutillier (Croatia) Mate Delić (Czech Republic) Adam Pavlásek (Serbia) Miki Janković
April 7	Turkey F11 Futures; Antalya-Belconti, Turkey; Hard $10,000	(France) Rémi Boutillier (Benin) Alexis Klégou; 6–3, 3–6, [10–7]	(Switzerland) Luca Margaroli (Czech Republic) Adam Pavlásek	(Slovakia) Karol Beck (France) Julien Obry	(France) Rémi Boutillier (Croatia) Mate Delić (Czech Republic) Adam Pavlásek (Serbia) Miki Janković
April 14	China F5 Futures; Chengdu, China; Hard $15,000	(China) Zhang Ze; 3–6, 6–3, 6–2	(Belarus) Dzmitry Zhyrmont	(Germany) Tim Pütz (Croatia) Borna Ćorić	(China) Wu Di (Belarus) Ilya Ivashka (China) Wang Chuhan (Australia) John Millman
April 14	China F5 Futures; Chengdu, China; Hard $15,000	(China) Gong Maoxin (China) Li Zhe; 1–0 retired	(Russia) Victor Baluda (Belarus) Ilya Ivashka	(Germany) Tim Pütz (Croatia) Borna Ćorić	(China) Wu Di (Belarus) Ilya Ivashka (China) Wang Chuhan (Australia) John Millman
April 14	Colombia F1 Futures; Pereira, Colombia; Clay $15,000	(Belgium) Arthur De Greef; 6–2, 6–3	(Brazil) Fabiano de Paula	(Colombia) Carlos Salamanca (Argentina) Facundo Mena	(Colombia) Felipe Mantilla (Argentina) Mateo Nicolás Martínez (Colombia) Michael Quintero (Colombia) Eduardo Struvay
April 14	Colombia F1 Futures; Pereira, Colombia; Clay $15,000	(Peru) Duilio Vallebuona (Bolivia) Federico Zeballos; 6–3, 7–6^{(7–5)}	(Colombia) Felipe Mantilla (Colombia) Eduardo Struvay	(Colombia) Carlos Salamanca (Argentina) Facundo Mena	(Colombia) Felipe Mantilla (Argentina) Mateo Nicolás Martínez (Colombia) Michael Quintero (Colombia) Eduardo Struvay
April 14	Brazil F2 Futures; Itajaí, Brazil; Clay $10,000	(Brazil) Caio Zampieri; 6–4, 3–6, 6–3	(Uruguay) Martín Cuevas	(Brazil) Daniel Dutra da Silva (Brazil) Leonardo Kirche	(Brazil) Thales Turini (Brazil) Carlos Eduardo Severino (Brazil) Alexandre Tsuchiya (Brazil) Nicolas Santos
April 14	Brazil F2 Futures; Itajaí, Brazil; Clay $10,000	(Brazil) Daniel Dutra da Silva (Brazil) Caio Zampieri; 6–3, 6–2	(Brazil) Filipe Brandão (Brazil) Oscar José Gutierrez	(Brazil) Daniel Dutra da Silva (Brazil) Leonardo Kirche	(Brazil) Thales Turini (Brazil) Carlos Eduardo Severino (Brazil) Alexandre Tsuchiya (Brazil) Nicolas Santos
April 14	Egypt F14 Futures; Sharm El Sheikh, Egypt; Clay $10,000	(Belgium) Germain Gigounon; 4–6, 6–1, 6–2	(France) Gleb Sakharov	(Czech Republic) Marek Michalička (Germany) Steven Moneke	(Egypt) Mazen Osama (Syria) Issam Haitham Taweel (Serbia) Danilo Petrović (France) Constant Lestienne
April 14	Egypt F14 Futures; Sharm El Sheikh, Egypt; Clay $10,000	(Belgium) Germain Gigounon (Belgium) Yannick Vandenbulcke; 6–4, 6–2	(Turkey) Haluk Akkoyun (Turkey) Anıl Yüksel	(Czech Republic) Marek Michalička (Germany) Steven Moneke	(Egypt) Mazen Osama (Syria) Issam Haitham Taweel (Serbia) Danilo Petrović (France) Constant Lestienne
April 14	Greece F6 Futures; Heraklion, Greece; Hard $10,000	(France) Tristan Lamasine; Walkover	(United Kingdom) Alexander Ward	(France) Sébastien Boltz (Venezuela) Ricardo Rodríguez	(Slovakia) Adrian Sikora (Spain) Carlos Gómez-Herrera (Germany) Daniel Masur (Czech Republic) Michal Konečný
April 14	Greece F6 Futures; Heraklion, Greece; Hard $10,000	(Germany) Daniel Masur (Czech Republic) Robin Staněk; 7–6^{(11–9)}, 3–6, [10–2]	(Japan) Ryota Kishi (Japan) Ken Onoda	(France) Sébastien Boltz (Venezuela) Ricardo Rodríguez	(Slovakia) Adrian Sikora (Spain) Carlos Gómez-Herrera (Germany) Daniel Masur (Czech Republic) Michal Konečný
April 14	Iran F5 Futures; Kish, Iran; Clay $10,000	(Croatia) Toni Androić; 4–6, 6–1, 6–1	(France) Martin Vaïsse	(Netherlands) Colin van Beem (France) Alexis Musialek	(Italy) Alberto Cammarata (India) Akash Wagh (Italy) Antonio Terzo (Slovakia) Marko Daniš
April 14	Iran F5 Futures; Kish, Iran; Clay $10,000	(France) Jérôme Inzerillo (France) Martin Vaïsse; 6–3, 6–2	(Ukraine) Vadim Alekseenko (Ukraine) Alexandr Kushakov	(Netherlands) Colin van Beem (France) Alexis Musialek	(Italy) Alberto Cammarata (India) Akash Wagh (Italy) Antonio Terzo (Slovakia) Marko Daniš
April 14	Italy F10 Futures; Santa Margherita di Pula, Italy; Clay $10,000	(Italy) Matteo Donati; 6–4, 7–6^{(9–7)}	(France) Johan Sébastien Tatlot	(Italy) Roberto Marcora (Italy) Marco Bortolotti	(Italy) Riccardo Sinicropi (Italy) Enrico Burzi (Belgium) Joris De Loore (Italy) Giacomo Oradini
April 14	Italy F10 Futures; Santa Margherita di Pula, Italy; Clay $10,000	(Italy) Marco Bortolotti (Italy) Stefano Napolitano; 6–4, 6–4	(Italy) Emanuele Molina (Italy) Riccardo Sinicropi	(Italy) Roberto Marcora (Italy) Marco Bortolotti	(Italy) Riccardo Sinicropi (Italy) Enrico Burzi (Belgium) Joris De Loore (Italy) Giacomo Oradini
April 14	Kazakhstan F6 Futures; Shymkent, Kazakhstan; Clay $10,000	(Russia) Aleksandr Lobkov; 6–4, 6–2	(Estonia) Vladimir Ivanov	(Slovakia) Filip Horanský (Russia) Ivan Nedelko	(Russia) Andrei Plotniy (Georgia (country)) Aleksandre Metreveli (Belarus) Andrei Vasilevski (Russia) Kirill Dmitriev
April 14	Kazakhstan F6 Futures; Shymkent, Kazakhstan; Clay $10,000	(Belarus) Yaraslav Shyla (Belarus) Andrei Vasilevski; 7–6^{(8–6)}, 6–0	(Estonia) Vladimir Ivanov (Russia) Ivan Nedelko	(Slovakia) Filip Horanský (Russia) Ivan Nedelko	(Russia) Andrei Plotniy (Georgia (country)) Aleksandre Metreveli (Belarus) Andrei Vasilevski (Russia) Kirill Dmitriev
April 14	Qatar F3 Futures; Doha, Qatar; Hard $10,000	(Netherlands) Antal van der Duim; 6–7^{(5–7)}, 6–3, 6–3	(Switzerland) Adrien Bossel	(Chinese Taipei) Chen Ti (United Kingdom) Oliver Golding	(Italy) Pietro Licciardi (United Kingdom) Joshua Ward-Hibbert (Slovakia) Ivo Klec (Sweden) Patrik Rosenholm
April 14	Qatar F3 Futures; Doha, Qatar; Hard $10,000	(Chinese Taipei) Chen Ti (South Africa) Ruan Roelofse; 6–1, 6–1	(United Kingdom) Oliver Golding (United Kingdom) Joshua Ward-Hibbert	(Chinese Taipei) Chen Ti (United Kingdom) Oliver Golding	(Italy) Pietro Licciardi (United Kingdom) Joshua Ward-Hibbert (Slovakia) Ivo Klec (Sweden) Patrik Rosenholm
April 14	Turkey F12 Futures; Antalya-Belconti, Turkey; Hard $10,000	(France) Hugo Nys; 6–0, 6–2	(Germany) Robin Kern	(Switzerland) Adrian Bodmer (Belgium) Maxime Authom	(Belgium) Yannick Mertens (France) Julien Demois (Latvia) Mārtiņš Podžus (Croatia) Franjo Raspudić
April 14	Turkey F12 Futures; Antalya-Belconti, Turkey; Hard $10,000	(Benin) Alexis Klégou (Switzerland) Luca Margaroli; 6–3, 6–1	(France) Éric Fomba (France) Maxime Tchoutakian	(Switzerland) Adrian Bodmer (Belgium) Maxime Authom	(Belgium) Yannick Mertens (France) Julien Demois (Latvia) Mārtiņš Podžus (Croatia) Franjo Raspudić
April 14	Uzbekistan F1 Futures; Qarshi, Uzbekistan; Hard $10,000	(Russia) Roman Safiullin; 2–6, 7–5, 6–1	(Uzbekistan) Temur Ismailov	(Uzbekistan) Shonigmatjon Shofayziyev (Poland) Piotr Gadomski	(Belarus) Artur Dubinski (Uzbekistan) Sarvar Ikramov (Russia) Denis Matsukevich (Greece) Markos Kalovelonis
April 14	Uzbekistan F1 Futures; Qarshi, Uzbekistan; Hard $10,000	(Poland) Piotr Gadomski (Poland) Adam Majchrowicz; 7–5, 6–1	(Greece) Markos Kalovelonis (Uzbekistan) Shonigmatjon Shofayziyev	(Uzbekistan) Shonigmatjon Shofayziyev (Poland) Piotr Gadomski	(Belarus) Artur Dubinski (Uzbekistan) Sarvar Ikramov (Russia) Denis Matsukevich (Greece) Markos Kalovelonis
April 21	Colombia F2 Futures; Pereira, Colombia; Clay $15,000	(Colombia) Nicolás Barrientos; 4–6, 6–3, 6–2	(Belgium) Arthur De Greef	(Bolivia) Hugo Dellien (Greece) Theodoros Angelinos	(Belgium) Yannik Reuter (Italy) Gianluigi Quinzi (Colombia) Eduardo Struvay (Colombia) Juan Carlos Spir
April 21	Colombia F2 Futures; Pereira, Colombia; Clay $15,000	(Puerto Rico) Alex Llompart (Argentina) Mateo Nicolás Martínez; 3–6, 6–3, [10–6]	(Colombia) Nicolás Barrientos (Colombia) Eduardo Struvay	(Bolivia) Hugo Dellien (Greece) Theodoros Angelinos	(Belgium) Yannik Reuter (Italy) Gianluigi Quinzi (Colombia) Eduardo Struvay (Colombia) Juan Carlos Spir
April 21	France F8 Futures; Angers, France; Clay (indoor) $15,000+H	(France) Julien Obry; 3–6, 6–2, 6–3	(France) Tristan Lamasine	(Belgium) Maxime Authom (Poland) Andriej Kapaś	(Serbia) Arsenije Zlatanović (France) Medy Chettar (France) Mathieu Rodrigues (France) Gleb Sakharov
April 21	France F8 Futures; Angers, France; Clay (indoor) $15,000+H	(Poland) Andriej Kapaś (Poland) Błażej Koniusz; 6–3, 6–4	(France) Olivier Charroin (France) Julien Obry	(Belgium) Maxime Authom (Poland) Andriej Kapaś	(Serbia) Arsenije Zlatanović (France) Medy Chettar (France) Mathieu Rodrigues (France) Gleb Sakharov
April 21	Korea F1 Futures; Seoul, South Korea; Hard $15,000	(South Korea) Lim Yong-kyu; 7–6^{(7–4)}, 6–3	(Austria) Maximilian Neuchrist	(South Korea) Chung Hyeon (Belarus) Dzmitry Zhyrmont	(Japan) Takuto Niki (South Korea) Nam Ji-sung (South Korea) Kim Cheong-eui (Denmark) Frederik Nielsen
April 21	Korea F1 Futures; Seoul, South Korea; Hard $15,000	(South Korea) Lee Hyung-taik (South Korea) Lim Yong-kyu; 6–2, 4–6, [10–4]	(Brazil) Henrique Cunha (United States) Daniel Nguyen	(South Korea) Chung Hyeon (Belarus) Dzmitry Zhyrmont	(Japan) Takuto Niki (South Korea) Nam Ji-sung (South Korea) Kim Cheong-eui (Denmark) Frederik Nielsen
April 21	Uzbekistan F2 Futures; Namangan, Uzbekistan; Hard $15,000	(Ukraine) Denys Molchanov; 6–3, 7–6^{(7–2)}	(Ukraine) Volodymyr Uzhylovskyi	(India) N. Sriram Balaji (Russia) Mikhail Fufygin	(Uzbekistan) Jurabek Karimov (Russia) Vitaly Kozyukov (Uzbekistan) Temur Ismailov (Russia) Roman Safiullin
April 21	Uzbekistan F2 Futures; Namangan, Uzbekistan; Hard $15,000	(India) N. Sriram Balaji (India) Ranjeet Virali-Murugesan; 6–3, 6–1	(Poland) Piotr Gadomski (India) Vishnu Vardhan	(India) N. Sriram Balaji (Russia) Mikhail Fufygin	(Uzbekistan) Jurabek Karimov (Russia) Vitaly Kozyukov (Uzbekistan) Temur Ismailov (Russia) Roman Safiullin
April 21	Brazil F3 Futures; Itajaí, Brazil; Clay $10,000	(Brazil) Bruno Sant'Anna; 7–5, 6–3	(Brazil) Rogério Dutra da Silva	(Brazil) João Menezes (Brazil) Carlos Eduardo Severino	(Brazil) Thales Turini (Uruguay) Martín Cuevas (Brazil) Caio Zampieri (Argentina) Nicolás Kicker
April 21	Brazil F3 Futures; Itajaí, Brazil; Clay $10,000	(Argentina) Nicolás Kicker (Brazil) Augusto Laranja; 3–6, 6–3, [14–12]	(Brazil) Rogério Dutra da Silva (Brazil) Caio Zampieri	(Brazil) João Menezes (Brazil) Carlos Eduardo Severino	(Brazil) Thales Turini (Uruguay) Martín Cuevas (Brazil) Caio Zampieri (Argentina) Nicolás Kicker
April 21	Egypt F15 Futures; Sharm El Sheikh, Egypt; Clay $10,000	(Cyprus) Petros Chrysochos; 6–3, 6–3	(Turkey) Cem İlkel	(Egypt) Karim-Mohamed Maamoun (Czech Republic) Libor Salaba	(France) Matthieu Perchicot (Syria) Issam Haitham Taweel (Turkey) Barış Ergüden (Argentina) Dante Gennaro
April 21	Egypt F15 Futures; Sharm El Sheikh, Egypt; Clay $10,000	(Serbia) Danilo Petrović (Serbia) Ilija Vučić; 7–5, 6–3	(Czech Republic) Libor Salaba (Austria) Thomas Statzberger	(Egypt) Karim-Mohamed Maamoun (Czech Republic) Libor Salaba	(France) Matthieu Perchicot (Syria) Issam Haitham Taweel (Turkey) Barış Ergüden (Argentina) Dante Gennaro
April 21	Great Britain F9 Futures; Bournemouth, Great Britain; Clay $10,000	(United Kingdom) Liam Broady; 7–5, 6–2	(United Kingdom) Luke Bambridge	(Australia) Gavin van Peperzeel (Germany) Pirmin Hänle	(Netherlands) Kevin Griekspoor (United Kingdom) Joshua Milton (United Kingdom) Jathan Malik (Poland) Kamil Majchrzak
April 21	Great Britain F9 Futures; Bournemouth, Great Britain; Clay $10,000	(United Kingdom) Lewis Burton (United Kingdom) Marcus Willis; 6–1, 7–5	(Australia) Jake Eames (United Kingdom) Brydan Klein	(Australia) Gavin van Peperzeel (Germany) Pirmin Hänle	(Netherlands) Kevin Griekspoor (United Kingdom) Joshua Milton (United Kingdom) Jathan Malik (Poland) Kamil Majchrzak
April 21	Greece F7 Futures; Heraklion, Greece; Hard $10,000	(United Kingdom) Alexander Ward; 6–0, 6–3	(Venezuela) Ricardo Rodríguez	(Czech Republic) Michal Konečný (United Kingdom) Cameron Norrie	(Serbia) Dejan Katić (Sweden) Ervin Eleskovic (Bulgaria) Dimitar Kuzmanov (United States) Evan Song
April 21	Greece F7 Futures; Heraklion, Greece; Hard $10,000	(Germany) Florian Barth (Germany) Daniel Masur; 6–2, 6–2	(France) Grégoire Barrère (France) Élie Rousset	(Czech Republic) Michal Konečný (United Kingdom) Cameron Norrie	(Serbia) Dejan Katić (Sweden) Ervin Eleskovic (Bulgaria) Dimitar Kuzmanov (United States) Evan Song
April 21	Iran F6 Futures; Kish, Iran; Clay $10,000	(Croatia) Toni Androić; 6–1, 6–4	(France) Alexis Musialek	(Chile) Matías Sborowitz (France) Martin Vaïsse	(Colombia) Cristian Rodríguez (Italy) Luca Pancaldi (France) François-Arthur Vibert (Netherlands) Colin van Beem
April 21	Iran F6 Futures; Kish, Iran; Clay $10,000	(India) Ronak Manuja (India) Akash Wagh; 2–6, 6–1, [11–9]	(France) Jérôme Inzerillo (France) Martin Vaïsse	(Chile) Matías Sborowitz (France) Martin Vaïsse	(Colombia) Cristian Rodríguez (Italy) Luca Pancaldi (France) François-Arthur Vibert (Netherlands) Colin van Beem
April 21	Italy F11 Futures; Santa Margherita di Pula, Italy; Clay $10,000	(Italy) Roberto Marcora; 6–1, 3–6, 6–2	(Italy) Riccardo Sinicropi	(Italy) Luca Vanni (Italy) Ferdinando Bonuccelli	(Portugal) Gonçalo Oliveira (Germany) Yannick Maden (Argentina) Pablo Galdón (France) Laurent Lokoli
April 21	Italy F11 Futures; Santa Margherita di Pula, Italy; Clay $10,000	(Spain) Albert Alcaraz Ivorra (Portugal) Gonçalo Oliveira; 1–6, 7–5, [11–9]	(Italy) Lorenzo Frigerio (Italy) Luca Vanni	(Italy) Luca Vanni (Italy) Ferdinando Bonuccelli	(Portugal) Gonçalo Oliveira (Germany) Yannick Maden (Argentina) Pablo Galdón (France) Laurent Lokoli
April 21	Mexico F1 Futures; Querétaro, Mexico; Hard $10,000+H	(United States) Adam El Mihdawy; 7–5, 6–4	(United States) Nicolas Meister	(United States) Kevin King (Peru) Mauricio Echazú	(Guatemala) Christopher Díaz Figueroa (Australia) Chris Letcher (Mexico) César Ramírez (Argentina) Maximiliano Estévez
April 21	Mexico F1 Futures; Querétaro, Mexico; Hard $10,000+H	(Mexico) César Ramírez (Mexico) Miguel Ángel Reyes-Varela; 6–3, 7–5	(United States) Kevin King (South Africa) Dean O'Brien	(United States) Kevin King (Peru) Mauricio Echazú	(Guatemala) Christopher Díaz Figueroa (Australia) Chris Letcher (Mexico) César Ramírez (Argentina) Maximiliano Estévez
April 21	Spain F6 Futures; Madrid, Spain; Clay $10,000	(Spain) Ricardo Ojeda Lara; 3–6, 6–3, 6–3	(Spain) Iván Arenas Gualda	(Spain) Marcos Giraldi Requena (Spain) Marc Giner	(Spain) Carlos Boluda Purkiss (Spain) Marc García Roman (Spain) Miguel Semmler (Russia) Ivan Gakhov
April 21	Spain F6 Futures; Madrid, Spain; Clay $10,000	(Spain) Jorge Hernando Ruano (Spain) Ricardo Villacorta Alonso; 7–5, 6–4	(Spain) Iván Arenas Gualda (Spain) Carlos Boluda Purkiss	(Spain) Marcos Giraldi Requena (Spain) Marc Giner	(Spain) Carlos Boluda Purkiss (Spain) Marc García Roman (Spain) Miguel Semmler (Russia) Ivan Gakhov
April 21	Turkey F13 Futures; Antalya-Belconti, Turkey; Hard $10,000	(Benin) Alexis Klégou; 4–6, 6–1, 6–0	(Germany) Peter Heller	(Latvia) Mārtiņš Podžus (France) Julien Demois	(Croatia) Franjo Raspudić (France) Hugo Nys (Russia) Stanislav Vovk (Russia) Anton Zaitcev
April 21	Turkey F13 Futures; Antalya-Belconti, Turkey; Hard $10,000	(Russia) Stanislav Vovk (Russia) Anton Zaitcev; 6–4, 7–5	(Benin) Alexis Klégou (Switzerland) Luca Margaroli	(Latvia) Mārtiņš Podžus (France) Julien Demois	(Croatia) Franjo Raspudić (France) Hugo Nys (Russia) Stanislav Vovk (Russia) Anton Zaitcev
April 28	France F9 Futures; Grasse, France; Clay (indoor) $15,000	(France) Jonathan Eysseric; 6–3, 6–4	(Italy) Federico Gaio	(France) Constant Lestienne (France) Maxime Chazal	(Argentina) Pablo Galdón (France) Martin Vaïsse (France) Gianni Mina (France) Laurent Lokoli
April 28	France F9 Futures; Grasse, France; Clay (indoor) $15,000	(Monaco) Benjamin Balleret (France) Jonathan Eysseric; 7–6^{(9–7)}, 7–5	(Ukraine) Marat Deviatiarov (Argentina) Pablo Galdón	(France) Constant Lestienne (France) Maxime Chazal	(Argentina) Pablo Galdón (France) Martin Vaïsse (France) Gianni Mina (France) Laurent Lokoli
April 28	Korea F2 Futures; Seoul, South Korea; Hard $15,000	(Australia) Dane Propoggia; 7–5, 3–6, 6–4	(South Korea) Cho Min-hyeok	(South Korea) Lim Yong-kyu (Japan) Takuto Niki	(New Zealand) Marcus Daniell (United Kingdom) Edward Corrie (South Korea) Lee Hyung-taik (South Korea) Nam Ji-sung
April 28	Korea F2 Futures; Seoul, South Korea; Hard $15,000	(Australia) Dane Propoggia (South Africa) Ruan Roelofse; 6–0, 6–3	(South Korea) Chung Hong (South Korea) Nam Ji-sung	(South Korea) Lim Yong-kyu (Japan) Takuto Niki	(New Zealand) Marcus Daniell (United Kingdom) Edward Corrie (South Korea) Lee Hyung-taik (South Korea) Nam Ji-sung
April 28	Mexico F2 Futures; Córdoba, Mexico; Hard $15,000	(United States) Kevin King; 6–2, 7–5	(United States) Adam El Mihdawy	(Peru) Jorge Brian Panta (Peru) Mauricio Echazú	(South Africa) Dean O'Brien (Guatemala) Christopher Díaz Figueroa (Brazil) Fabiano de Paula (Argentina) Maximiliano Estévez
April 28	Mexico F2 Futures; Córdoba, Mexico; Hard $15,000	(Mexico) César Ramírez (Mexico) Miguel Ángel Reyes-Varela; 7–6^{(7–1)}, 6–1	(United States) Kevin King (South Africa) Dean O'Brien	(Peru) Jorge Brian Panta (Peru) Mauricio Echazú	(South Africa) Dean O'Brien (Guatemala) Christopher Díaz Figueroa (Brazil) Fabiano de Paula (Argentina) Maximiliano Estévez
April 28	Uzbekistan F3 Futures; Andijan, Uzbekistan; Hard $15,000	(Ukraine) Denys Molchanov; 6–1, 6–2	(Russia) Richard Muzaev	(Russia) Roman Safiullin (India) Vishnu Vardhan	(Russia) Fedor Chervyakov (France) Rémi Boutillier (Russia) Evgeny Elistratov (Ukraine) Dmytro Badanov
April 28	Uzbekistan F3 Futures; Andijan, Uzbekistan; Hard $15,000	(Russia) Denis Matsukevich (Ukraine) Denys Molchanov; 7–5, 7–5	(Kyrgyzstan) Daniiar Duldaev (Ukraine) Volodymyr Uzhylovskyi	(Russia) Roman Safiullin (India) Vishnu Vardhan	(Russia) Fedor Chervyakov (France) Rémi Boutillier (Russia) Evgeny Elistratov (Ukraine) Dmytro Badanov
April 28	Brazil F4 Futures; Natal, Brazil; Clay $10,000	(Chile) Cristian Garín; 6–4, 4–6, 6–3	(Brazil) Thales Turini	(Brazil) Alex Blumenberg (Brazil) Leonardo Kirche	(Brazil) Eduardo Dischinger (Brazil) Caio Silva (Brazil) Carlos Eduardo Severino (Argentina) Tomás Iriarte
April 28	Brazil F4 Futures; Natal, Brazil; Clay $10,000	(Brazil) Leonardo Kirche (Brazil) Victor Maynard; 6–3, 3–6, [10–6]	(Brazil) Caio Silva (Brazil) Thales Turini	(Brazil) Alex Blumenberg (Brazil) Leonardo Kirche	(Brazil) Eduardo Dischinger (Brazil) Caio Silva (Brazil) Carlos Eduardo Severino (Argentina) Tomás Iriarte
April 28	Egypt F16 Futures; Sharm El Sheikh, Egypt; Clay $10,000	(Spain) Marc Giner; 3–6, 6–1, 6–4	(Italy) Pietro Rondoni	(Russia) Ivan Nedelko (Serbia) Danilo Petrović	(Italy) Riccardo Bonadio (Argentina) Leandro Portmann (Russia) Dmitry Surchenko (Austria) Pascal Brunner
April 28	Egypt F16 Futures; Sharm El Sheikh, Egypt; Clay $10,000	(Italy) Riccardo Bonadio (Italy) Pietro Rondoni; Walkover	(Croatia) Antun Pehar (Serbia) Danilo Petrović	(Russia) Ivan Nedelko (Serbia) Danilo Petrović	(Italy) Riccardo Bonadio (Argentina) Leandro Portmann (Russia) Dmitry Surchenko (Austria) Pascal Brunner
April 28	Great Britain F10 Futures; Edinburgh, Great Britain; Clay $10,000	(United Kingdom) Marcus Willis; 6–1, 6–3	(United Kingdom) Neil Pauffley	(United Kingdom) Liam Broady (United Kingdom) Ashley Hewitt	(Australia) Gavin van Peperzeel (Belgium) Julien Cagnina (United Kingdom) Brydan Klein (Australia) Maverick Banes
April 28	Great Britain F10 Futures; Edinburgh, Great Britain; Clay $10,000	(United Kingdom) Jonny O'Mara (United Kingdom) Marcus Willis; 7–6^{(7–3)}, 6–1	(Australia) Maverick Banes (Australia) Gavin van Peperzeel	(United Kingdom) Liam Broady (United Kingdom) Ashley Hewitt	(Australia) Gavin van Peperzeel (Belgium) Julien Cagnina (United Kingdom) Brydan Klein (Australia) Maverick Banes
April 28	Iran F7 Futures; Kish, Iran; Clay $10,000	(Serbia) Marko Tepavac; 6–1, 2–6, 6–2	(Chile) Matías Sborowitz	(Ukraine) Vadim Alekseenko (Germany) Kevin Kaczynski	(Italy) Luca Pancaldi (Austria) Maxi Pongratz (Serbia) Goran Marković (Argentina) Matías Franco Descotte
April 28	Iran F7 Futures; Kish, Iran; Clay $10,000	(Serbia) Marko Tepavac (Netherlands) Mark Vervoort; 7–6^{(7–5)}, 4–6, [10–1]	(India) Ronak Manuja (India) Akash Wagh	(Ukraine) Vadim Alekseenko (Germany) Kevin Kaczynski	(Italy) Luca Pancaldi (Austria) Maxi Pongratz (Serbia) Goran Marković (Argentina) Matías Franco Descotte
April 28	Israel F4 Futures; Ashkelon, Israel; Hard $10,000	(Germany) Robin Kern; 6–4, 6–1	(Italy) Stefano Napolitano	(Switzerland) Adrien Bossel (United States) Evan Song	(Belgium) Christopher Heyman (Russia) Evgeny Karlovskiy (Israel) Bar Tzuf Botzer (Germany) Timon Reichelt
April 28	Israel F4 Futures; Ashkelon, Israel; Hard $10,000	(Slovenia) Tom Kočevar-Dešman (Germany) Timon Reichelt; 6–4, 6–4	(Israel) Edan Bakshi (Israel) Noam Behr	(Switzerland) Adrien Bossel (United States) Evan Song	(Belgium) Christopher Heyman (Russia) Evgeny Karlovskiy (Israel) Bar Tzuf Botzer (Germany) Timon Reichelt
April 28	Italy F12 Futures; Santa Margherita di Pula, Italy; Clay $10,000	(Italy) Luca Vanni; 6–1, 3–1 retired	(Italy) Alessio di Mauro	(Austria) Gibril Diarra (Croatia) Viktor Galović	(Spain) Albert Alcaraz Ivorra (Japan) Jumpei Yamasaki (Italy) Francesco Picco (Italy) Omar Giacalone
April 28	Italy F12 Futures; Santa Margherita di Pula, Italy; Clay $10,000	(Italy) Riccardo Sinicropi (Italy) Luca Vanni; 7–6^{(7–3)}, 7–5	(Italy) Daniele Giorgini (Italy) Matteo Volante	(Austria) Gibril Diarra (Croatia) Viktor Galović	(Spain) Albert Alcaraz Ivorra (Japan) Jumpei Yamasaki (Italy) Francesco Picco (Italy) Omar Giacalone
April 28	Spain F7 Futures; Móstoles, Spain; Clay $10,000	(Spain) Iván Arenas Gualda; 6–2, 6–2	(Spain) Ricardo Ojeda Lara	(Spain) Pablo Vivero González (Spain) Samuel Ribeiro Navarrete	(France) Laurent Rochette (Spain) Javier Pulgar García (Spain) Ricardo Villacorta Alonso (Spain) Jaime Pulgar García
April 28	Spain F7 Futures; Móstoles, Spain; Clay $10,000	(Spain) Juan Samuel Arauzo Martínez (Spain) Jaime Pulgar García; 7–6^{(7–3)}, 6–3	(Spain) Iván Arenas Gualda (Spain) Javier Pulgar García	(Spain) Pablo Vivero González (Spain) Samuel Ribeiro Navarrete	(France) Laurent Rochette (Spain) Javier Pulgar García (Spain) Ricardo Villacorta Alonso (Spain) Jaime Pulgar García
April 28	Sweden F1 Futures; Karlskrona, Sweden; Clay $10,000	(Sweden) Christian Lindell; 6–2, 6–3	(Austria) Nicolas Reissig	(Slovenia) Mike Urbanija (Sweden) Ervin Eleskovic	(Germany) Nico Matic (Sweden) Milos Sekulic (Sweden) Patrik Rosenholm (Sweden) Daniel Windahl
April 28	Sweden F1 Futures; Karlskrona, Sweden; Clay $10,000	(Sweden) Jacob Adaktusson (Sweden) Robin Olin; 6–3, 4–6, [10–5]	(Germany) Leon Schutt (Poland) Maciej Smoła	(Slovenia) Mike Urbanija (Sweden) Ervin Eleskovic	(Germany) Nico Matic (Sweden) Milos Sekulic (Sweden) Patrik Rosenholm (Sweden) Daniel Windahl
April 28	Turkey F14 Futures; Antalya-Belconti, Turkey; Hard $10,000	(India) Ramkumar Ramanathan; 6–7^{(6–8)}, 6–0, 6–2	(Russia) Anton Zaitcev	(Germany) Peter Heller (Russia) Stanislav Vovk	(Switzerland) Siméon Rossier (Moldova) Andrei Ciumac (Japan) Yusuke Watanuki (Japan) Hiroyasu Ehara
April 28	Turkey F14 Futures; Antalya-Belconti, Turkey; Hard $10,000	(Japan) Sho Katayama (Japan) Bumpei Sato; 6–3, 6–1	(Moldova) Andrei Ciumac (India) Ramkumar Ramanathan	(Germany) Peter Heller (Russia) Stanislav Vovk	(Switzerland) Siméon Rossier (Moldova) Andrei Ciumac (Japan) Yusuke Watanuki (Japan) Hiroyasu Ehara
April 28	USA F12 Futures; Vero Beach, United States; Hard $10,000	(United States) Connor Smith; 6–2, 6–4	(Argentina) Facundo Mena	(United States) Gregory Ouellette (Chile) Jorge Aguilar	(United States) Martin Redlicki (United States) Ty Trombetta (Japan) Naoki Nakagawa (United States) Tommy Paul
April 28	USA F12 Futures; Vero Beach, United States; Hard $10,000	(Chile) Jorge Aguilar (Mexico) Daniel Garza; 6–4, 6–7^{(3–7)}, [10–7]	(United States) Devin McCarthy (United States) Connor Smith	(United States) Gregory Ouellette (Chile) Jorge Aguilar	(United States) Martin Redlicki (United States) Ty Trombetta (Japan) Naoki Nakagawa (United States) Tommy Paul

=== May ===
Week of	Tournament	Winner	Runners-up	Semifinalists	Quarterfinalists
May 5	Mexico F3 Futures; Mexico City, Mexico; Hard $15,000	(United States) Kevin King; 6–1, 6–2	(Guatemala) Christopher Díaz Figueroa	(South Africa) Dean O'Brien (Venezuela) Luis David Martínez	(Argentina) Maximiliano Estévez (United States) Adam El Mihdawy (Colombia) Nicolás Barrientos (Mexico) Eduardo Orozco
May 5	Mexico F3 Futures; Mexico City, Mexico; Hard $15,000	(United States) Kevin King (South Africa) Dean O'Brien; 6–3, 6–4	(Puerto Rico) Alex Llompart (Argentina) Mateo Nicolás Martínez	(South Africa) Dean O'Brien (Venezuela) Luis David Martínez	(Argentina) Maximiliano Estévez (United States) Adam El Mihdawy (Colombia) Nicolás Barrientos (Mexico) Eduardo Orozco
May 5	Bosnia and Herzegovina F1 Futures; Doboj, Bosnia and Herzegovina; Clay $10,000	(Slovakia) Adrian Partl; 6–4, 6–4	(Bosnia and Herzegovina) Mirza Bašić	(Bosnia and Herzegovina) Tomislav Brkić (Croatia) Joško Topić	(Serbia) Miljan Zekić (Slovakia) Marek Semjan (Bosnia and Herzegovina) Ismar Gorčić (Serbia) Miki Janković
May 5	Bosnia and Herzegovina F1 Futures; Doboj, Bosnia and Herzegovina; Clay $10,000	(Bosnia and Herzegovina) Tomislav Brkić (Serbia) Nikola Ćaćić; 6–1, 6–3	(Serbia) Ivan Milivojević (Serbia) Bojan Zdravković	(Bosnia and Herzegovina) Tomislav Brkić (Croatia) Joško Topić	(Serbia) Miljan Zekić (Slovakia) Marek Semjan (Bosnia and Herzegovina) Ismar Gorčić (Serbia) Miki Janković
May 5	Croatia F8 Futures; Bol, Croatia; Clay $10,000	(Serbia) Laslo Djere; 6–1, 6–2	(Slovenia) Mike Urbanija	(Australia) Christopher O'Connell (Australia) Jordan Thompson	(Argentina) Valentin Florez (Croatia) Tomislav Draganja (Slovakia) Michal Milko (Australia) Matthew Barton
May 5	Croatia F8 Futures; Bol, Croatia; Clay $10,000	(Australia) Matthew Barton (Australia) Jordan Thompson; 6–2, 6–3	(Slovenia) Tomislav Ternar (Slovenia) Mike Urbanija	(Australia) Christopher O'Connell (Australia) Jordan Thompson	(Argentina) Valentin Florez (Croatia) Tomislav Draganja (Slovakia) Michal Milko (Australia) Matthew Barton
May 5	Egypt F17 Futures; Sharm El Sheikh, Egypt; Clay $10,000	(Austria) Pascal Brunner; 2–6, 6–4, 6–2	(Italy) Pietro Rondoni	(Belgium) Germain Gigounon (Argentina) Gaston Arturo Grimolizzi	(Egypt) Karim-Mohamed Maamoun (Russia) Ivan Nedelko (Czech Republic) Adam Pavlásek (Italy) Riccardo Bonadio
May 5	Egypt F17 Futures; Sharm El Sheikh, Egypt; Clay $10,000	(Italy) Riccardo Bonadio (Italy) Pietro Rondoni; 7–5, 2–6, [10–8]	(Argentina) Gaston Arturo Grimolizzi (Italy) Giorgio Portaluri	(Belgium) Germain Gigounon (Argentina) Gaston Arturo Grimolizzi	(Egypt) Karim-Mohamed Maamoun (Russia) Ivan Nedelko (Czech Republic) Adam Pavlásek (Italy) Riccardo Bonadio
May 5	Great Britain F11 Futures; Newcastle upon Tyne, Great Britain; Clay $10,000	(Germany) Peter Torebko; 6–1, 6–4	(United Kingdom) Ashley Hewitt	(United Kingdom) Neil Pauffley (Benin) Alexis Klégou	(United Kingdom) Kyle Edmund (Australia) Jake Eames (United Kingdom) Jathan Malik (Republic of Ireland) Daniel Glancy
May 5	Great Britain F11 Futures; Newcastle upon Tyne, Great Britain; Clay $10,000	(United Kingdom) Jonny O'Mara (United Kingdom) Marcus Willis; 7–6^{(8–6)}, 6–1	(Australia) Maverick Banes (Australia) Gavin van Peperzeel	(United Kingdom) Neil Pauffley (Benin) Alexis Klégou	(United Kingdom) Kyle Edmund (Australia) Jake Eames (United Kingdom) Jathan Malik (Republic of Ireland) Daniel Glancy
May 5	Israel F5 Futures; Ashkelon, Israel; Hard $10,000	(Republic of Ireland) Sam Barry; 4–6, 6–1, 6–2	(Switzerland) Adrien Bossel	(Slovenia) Tom Kočevar-Dešman (Germany) Robin Kern	(Israel) Dekel Bar (Israel) Ben Patael (Russia) Vladimir Polyakov (Belgium) Christopher Heyman
May 5	Israel F5 Futures; Ashkelon, Israel; Hard $10,000	(Israel) Dekel Bar (Lithuania) Lukas Mugevičius; 6–4, 7–5	(Japan) Shotaro Goto (Japan) Kazuma Kawachi	(Slovenia) Tom Kočevar-Dešman (Germany) Robin Kern	(Israel) Dekel Bar (Israel) Ben Patael (Russia) Vladimir Polyakov (Belgium) Christopher Heyman
May 5	Italy F13 Futures; Santa Margherita di Pula, Italy; Clay $10,000	(Italy) Luca Vanni; 7–5, 6–3	(Germany) Florian Fallert	(Italy) Gianluca Naso (Spain) Juan Lizariturry	(Italy) Francesco Picco (Italy) Gianluca Mager (Croatia) Viktor Galović (Italy) Andrea Basso
May 5	Italy F13 Futures; Santa Margherita di Pula, Italy; Clay $10,000	(Italy) Francesco Borgo (Italy) Gianluca Naso; 7–5, 6–3	(Italy) Matteo Fago (Italy) Manuel Mazzella	(Italy) Gianluca Naso (Spain) Juan Lizariturry	(Italy) Francesco Picco (Italy) Gianluca Mager (Croatia) Viktor Galović (Italy) Andrea Basso
May 5	Spain F8 Futures; Lleida, Spain; Clay $10,000	(Chile) Hans Podlipnik Castillo; 7–6^{(7–1)}, 6–2	(Spain) Juan Samuel Arauzo Martínez	(Spain) David Vega Hernández (Spain) José Checa Calvo	(Spain) Marc Giner (Japan) Ryota Kishi (Russia) Ivan Gakhov (Spain) Bernabé Zapata Miralles
May 5	Spain F8 Futures; Lleida, Spain; Clay $10,000	(Venezuela) Jordi Muñoz Abreu (Netherlands) Mark Vervoort; 3–6, 6–1, [10–6]	(Spain) Sergio Martos Gornés (Spain) Pol Toledo Bagué	(Spain) David Vega Hernández (Spain) José Checa Calvo	(Spain) Marc Giner (Japan) Ryota Kishi (Russia) Ivan Gakhov (Spain) Bernabé Zapata Miralles
May 5	Sweden F2 Futures; Båstad, Sweden; Clay $10,000	(Sweden) Elias Ymer; 6–3, 4–6, 7–6^{(8–6)}	(Sweden) Patrik Rosenholm	(Sweden) Markus Eriksson (Sweden) Christian Lindell	(Germany) Yannick Maden (Sweden) Isak Arvidsson (Sweden) Morgan Johansson (Austria) Bastian Trinker
May 5	Sweden F2 Futures; Båstad, Sweden; Clay $10,000	(Sweden) Isak Arvidsson (Sweden) Markus Eriksson; 6–2, 4–6, [10–6]	(Sweden) Jacob Adaktusson (Sweden) Robin Olin	(Sweden) Markus Eriksson (Sweden) Christian Lindell	(Germany) Yannick Maden (Sweden) Isak Arvidsson (Sweden) Morgan Johansson (Austria) Bastian Trinker
May 5	Turkey F15 Futures; Antalya-Belconti, Turkey; Hard $10,000	(Czech Republic) Michal Konečný; 6–1, 6–4	(Germany) Mats Moraing	(Spain) Jaime Pulgar García (Croatia) Matija Pecotić	(Germany) Matthias Wunner (Mexico) Luis Patiño (Japan) Hiroyasu Ehara (India) Ramkumar Ramanathan
May 5	Turkey F15 Futures; Antalya-Belconti, Turkey; Hard $10,000	(Japan) Hiroyasu Ehara (Japan) Sho Katayama; 6–0, 6–1	(Germany) Peter Heller (Spain) Jaime Pulgar García	(Spain) Jaime Pulgar García (Croatia) Matija Pecotić	(Germany) Matthias Wunner (Mexico) Luis Patiño (Japan) Hiroyasu Ehara (India) Ramkumar Ramanathan
May 5	USA F13 Futures; Orange Park, United States; Clay $10,000	(Chile) Nicolás Jarry; 6–1, 7–6^{(8–6)}	(United States) Mitchell Krueger	(United States) Connor Smith (United States) Gregory Ouellette	(United States) Cătălin-Ionuț Gârd (United States) Bjorn Fratangelo (United States) Eric Quigley (Colombia) Michael Quintero
May 5	USA F13 Futures; Orange Park, United States; Clay $10,000	(United States) Dennis Novikov (United States) Connor Smith; 6–3, 6–2	(United States) Bjorn Fratangelo (United States) Mitchell Krueger	(United States) Connor Smith (United States) Gregory Ouellette	(United States) Cătălin-Ionuț Gârd (United States) Bjorn Fratangelo (United States) Eric Quigley (Colombia) Michael Quintero
May 12	Mexico F4 Futures; Morelia, Mexico; Hard $15,000	(Mexico) Miguel Ángel Reyes-Varela; 6–3, 6–3	(Colombia) Eduardo Struvay	(Colombia) Carlos Salamanca (United States) Ernesto Escobedo	(Ecuador) Gonzalo Escobar (Peru) Mauricio Echazú (United States) Nicolas Meister (Australia) Chris Letcher
May 12	Mexico F4 Futures; Morelia, Mexico; Hard $15,000	(Mexico) César Ramírez (Mexico) Miguel Ángel Reyes-Varela; 7–6^{(7–3)}, 6–3	(Peru) Mauricio Echazú (Peru) Jorge Panta	(Colombia) Carlos Salamanca (United States) Ernesto Escobedo	(Ecuador) Gonzalo Escobar (Peru) Mauricio Echazú (United States) Nicolas Meister (Australia) Chris Letcher
May 12	Bosnia and Herzegovina F2 Futures; Prijedor, Bosnia and Herzegovina; Clay $10,000	(Serbia) Laslo Djere; 6–3, 6–2	(Bosnia and Herzegovina) Tomislav Brkić	(Ukraine) Danylo Kalenichenko (Slovakia) Juraj Masár	(Hungary) Gergely Madarász (Serbia) Nikola Ćaćić (Slovakia) Adrian Partl (Croatia) Joško Topić
May 12	Bosnia and Herzegovina F2 Futures; Prijedor, Bosnia and Herzegovina; Clay $10,000	(Bosnia and Herzegovina) Tomislav Brkić (Serbia) Nikola Ćaćić; 6–3, 6–2	(Serbia) Darko Jandrić (Croatia) Ante Marinčić	(Ukraine) Danylo Kalenichenko (Slovakia) Juraj Masár	(Hungary) Gergely Madarász (Serbia) Nikola Ćaćić (Slovakia) Adrian Partl (Croatia) Joško Topić
May 12	Croatia F9 Futures; Bol, Croatia; Clay $10,000	(Croatia) Dino Marcan; 6–3, 6–3	(Slovenia) Mike Urbanija	(Australia) Matthew Barton (Slovenia) Tomislav Ternar	(Australia) Jordan Thompson (Australia) Akira Santillan (Croatia) Duje Kekez (France) Maxime Chazal
May 12	Croatia F9 Futures; Bol, Croatia; Clay $10,000	(Australia) Matthew Barton (Australia) Jordan Thompson; 6–2, 6–1	(Croatia) Tomislav Draganja (Croatia) Dino Marcan	(Australia) Matthew Barton (Slovenia) Tomislav Ternar	(Australia) Jordan Thompson (Australia) Akira Santillan (Croatia) Duje Kekez (France) Maxime Chazal
May 12	Czech Republic F1 Futures; Teplice, Czech Republic; Clay $10,000	(Czech Republic) Jan Mertl; 6–1, 2–6, 6–0	(Poland) Andriej Kapaś	(Chile) Ricardo Urzúa Rivera (Belarus) Uladzimir Ignatik	(Germany) Oscar Otte (Czech Republic) Robin Staněk (Czech Republic) Roman Jebavý (Czech Republic) Pavel Štaubert
May 12	Czech Republic F1 Futures; Teplice, Czech Republic; Clay $10,000	(Poland) Andriej Kapaś (Russia) Andrey Rublev; 7–5, 6–2	(Czech Republic) David Škoch (Czech Republic) Robin Staněk	(Chile) Ricardo Urzúa Rivera (Belarus) Uladzimir Ignatik	(Germany) Oscar Otte (Czech Republic) Robin Staněk (Czech Republic) Roman Jebavý (Czech Republic) Pavel Štaubert
May 12	Egypt F18 Futures; Sharm El Sheikh, Egypt; Clay $10,000	(Czech Republic) Adam Pavlásek; 2–6, 6–0, 6–2	(Belgium) Germain Gigounon	(Egypt) Karim-Mohamed Maamoun (Russia) Ivan Nedelko	(Argentina) Sebastián Exequiel Pini (Argentina) Gaston Arturo Grimolizzi (Canada) Antoine Richard (Italy) Giorgio Portaluri
May 12	Egypt F18 Futures; Sharm El Sheikh, Egypt; Clay $10,000	(Argentina) Gaston Arturo Grimolizzi (Italy) Giorgio Portaluri; 6–7^{(7–9)}, 6–1, [10–6]	(Belgium) Germain Gigounon (Canada) Antoine Richard	(Egypt) Karim-Mohamed Maamoun (Russia) Ivan Nedelko	(Argentina) Sebastián Exequiel Pini (Argentina) Gaston Arturo Grimolizzi (Canada) Antoine Richard (Italy) Giorgio Portaluri
May 12	Israel F6 Futures; Acre, Israel; Hard $10,000	(United States) Evan Song; 6–2, 1–6, 7–5	(France) Yannick Jankovits	(Israel) Tal Goldengoren (Germany) Sebastian Wagner	(Republic of Ireland) Sam Barry (Argentina) Matías Franco Descotte (Israel) Mor Bulis (Russia) Alexander Mozgovoy
May 12	Israel F6 Futures; Acre, Israel; Hard $10,000	(Republic of Ireland) Sam Barry (United States) Evan Song; 6–2, 6–0	(Argentina) Matías Franco Descotte (Brazil) Gustavo Guerses	(Israel) Tal Goldengoren (Germany) Sebastian Wagner	(Republic of Ireland) Sam Barry (Argentina) Matías Franco Descotte (Israel) Mor Bulis (Russia) Alexander Mozgovoy
May 12	Italy F14 Futures; Santa Margherita di Pula, Italy; Clay $10,000	(Italy) Roberto Marcora; 7–5, 6–4	(Italy) Gianluca Naso	(Brazil) Pedro Sakamoto (Italy) Luca Vanni	(Italy) Pietro Licciardi (France) Alexis Musialek (Italy) Matteo Trevisan (Spain) Juan Lizariturry
May 12	Italy F14 Futures; Santa Margherita di Pula, Italy; Clay $10,000	(Italy) Omar Giacalone (Italy) Gianluca Naso; 6–4, 6–0	(Italy) Lorenzo Frigerio (Italy) Matteo Trevisan	(Brazil) Pedro Sakamoto (Italy) Luca Vanni	(Italy) Pietro Licciardi (France) Alexis Musialek (Italy) Matteo Trevisan (Spain) Juan Lizariturry
May 12	Portugal F4 Futures; Termas de Monfortinho, Portugal; Carpet $10,000	(Spain) David Vega Hernández; 7–5, 6–7^{(2–7)}, 3–6	(France) Fabrice Martin	(Spain) Roberto Ortega Olmedo (Portugal) João Domingues	(Spain) Ricardo Villacorta Alonso (Portugal) Frederico Ferreira Silva (United Kingdom) Joshua Milton (Spain) Iván Arenas Gualda
May 12	Portugal F4 Futures; Termas de Monfortinho, Portugal; Carpet $10,000	(Australia) Jordan Kerr (France) Fabrice Martin; 6–2, 6–7^{(3–7)}, [10–4]	(Portugal) Romain Barbosa (Portugal) Frederico Ferreira Silva	(Spain) Roberto Ortega Olmedo (Portugal) João Domingues	(Spain) Ricardo Villacorta Alonso (Portugal) Frederico Ferreira Silva (United Kingdom) Joshua Milton (Spain) Iván Arenas Gualda
May 12	Romania F1 Futures; Galați, Romania; Clay $10,000	(Italy) Gianluigi Quinzi; 3–6, 6–2, 3–6	(Romania) Vasile Antonescu	(France) Samuel Bensoussan (Romania) Petru-Alexandru Luncanu	(Romania) Alexandru-Daniel Carpen (Romania) Robert Coman (Romania) Andrei Ștefan Apostol (United Kingdom) Jack Carpenter
May 12	Romania F1 Futures; Galați, Romania; Clay $10,000	(Moldova) Andrei Ciumac (Moldova) Maxim Dubarenco; 6–2, 7–6^{(7–4)}	(Romania) Vasile Antonescu (Romania) Alexandru-Daniel Carpen	(France) Samuel Bensoussan (Romania) Petru-Alexandru Luncanu	(Romania) Alexandru-Daniel Carpen (Romania) Robert Coman (Romania) Andrei Ștefan Apostol (United Kingdom) Jack Carpenter
May 12	Spain F9 Futures; Valldoreix, Spain; Clay $10,000	(Belgium) Arthur De Greef; 7–6^{(7–2)}, 6–3	(Spain) Juan Samuel Arauzo Martínez	(Brazil) Marcelo Zormann (Spain) José Checa Calvo	(Mexico) Lucas Gómez (Argentina) Pedro Cachin (Belgium) Yannik Reuter (United States) Collin Altamirano
May 12	Spain F9 Futures; Valldoreix, Spain; Clay $10,000	(Japan) Soichiro Moritani (Japan) Takashi Saito; 1–6, 6–4, [10–6]	(Venezuela) Jordi Muñoz Abreu (Netherlands) Mark Vervoort	(Brazil) Marcelo Zormann (Spain) José Checa Calvo	(Mexico) Lucas Gómez (Argentina) Pedro Cachin (Belgium) Yannik Reuter (United States) Collin Altamirano
May 12	Sweden F3 Futures; Båstad, Sweden; Clay $10,000	(Sweden) Christian Lindell; 6–3, 7–6^{(7–5)}	(Sweden) Patrik Rosenholm	(Bolivia) Hugo Dellien (Estonia) Vladimir Ivanov	(Chile) Matías Sborowitz (Sweden) Isak Arvidsson (Austria) Bastian Trinker (Norway) Joachim Bjerke
May 12	Sweden F3 Futures; Båstad, Sweden; Clay $10,000	(Sweden) Isak Arvidsson (Sweden) Markus Eriksson; 6–4, 6–2	(Finland) Timi Kivijarvi (Finland) Henrik Sillanpää	(Bolivia) Hugo Dellien (Estonia) Vladimir Ivanov	(Chile) Matías Sborowitz (Sweden) Isak Arvidsson (Austria) Bastian Trinker (Norway) Joachim Bjerke
May 12	Tunisia F1 Futures; Sousse, Tunisia; Hard $10,000	(France) Rémi Boutillier; 6–1, 6–4	(France) Rudy Coco	(France) Jules Marie (France) Théo Fournerie	(France) Maxime Tchoutakian (Serbia) Nikola Milojević (Spain) David Pérez Sanz (Poland) Arkadiusz Kocyła
May 12	Tunisia F1 Futures; Sousse, Tunisia; Hard $10,000	(Czech Republic) Dominik Kellovský (Czech Republic) Pavel Šnobel; 5–7, 7–5, [14–12]	(France) Rémi Boutillier (France) Maxime Tchoutakian	(France) Jules Marie (France) Théo Fournerie	(France) Maxime Tchoutakian (Serbia) Nikola Milojević (Spain) David Pérez Sanz (Poland) Arkadiusz Kocyła
May 12	Turkey F16 Futures; Antalya-Belconti, Turkey; Hard $10,000	(Venezuela) Ricardo Rodríguez; 6–2, 6–3	(Spain) Jaime Pulgar García	(Bulgaria) Dimitar Kuzmanov (India) Ramkumar Ramanathan	(Germany) Mats Moraing (Japan) Yusuke Watanuki (South Korea) Kim Young-seok (Russia) Kirill Dmitriev
May 12	Turkey F16 Futures; Antalya-Belconti, Turkey; Hard $10,000	(Bulgaria) Dimitar Kuzmanov (Venezuela) Ricardo Rodríguez; Walkover	(France) Hugo Grenier (India) Ramkumar Ramanathan	(Bulgaria) Dimitar Kuzmanov (India) Ramkumar Ramanathan	(Germany) Mats Moraing (Japan) Yusuke Watanuki (South Korea) Kim Young-seok (Russia) Kirill Dmitriev
May 12	Ukraine F4 Futures; Rivne, Ukraine; Clay $10,000	(Ukraine) Vladyslav Manafov; 6–2, 4–6, 7–5	(Ukraine) Dmytro Badanov	(Germany) Richard Becker (United States) Nikita Kryvonos	(Ukraine) Volodymyr Uzhylovskyi (Ukraine) Oleg Prihodko (Ukraine) Gleb Alekseenko (Ukraine) Yuriy Kryvoy
May 12	Ukraine F4 Futures; Rivne, Ukraine; Clay $10,000	(United States) Nikita Kryvonos (Bulgaria) Vasko Mladenov; 6–4, 6–4	(Ukraine) Yurii Dzhavakian (Ukraine) Volodymyr Uzhylovskyi	(Germany) Richard Becker (United States) Nikita Kryvonos	(Ukraine) Volodymyr Uzhylovskyi (Ukraine) Oleg Prihodko (Ukraine) Gleb Alekseenko (Ukraine) Yuriy Kryvoy
May 12	USA F14 Futures; Tampa, United States; Clay $10,000	(United States) Bjorn Fratangelo; 6–2, 6–3	(Chile) Cristian Garín	(United States) Mitchell Krueger (Chile) Nicolás Jarry	(United States) Gregory Ouellette (United States) Mico Santiago (United States) Dennis Nevolo (Canada) Tommy Mylnikov
May 12	USA F14 Futures; Tampa, United States; Clay $10,000	(Chile) Nicolás Jarry (Brazil) Tiago Lopes; 7–5, 6–1	(United States) Bjorn Fratangelo (United States) Mitchell Krueger	(United States) Mitchell Krueger (Chile) Nicolás Jarry	(United States) Gregory Ouellette (United States) Mico Santiago (United States) Dennis Nevolo (Canada) Tommy Mylnikov
May 19	Mexico F5 Futures; Ciudad Obregón, Mexico; Hard $15,000	(United States) Dennis Novikov; 3–6, 6–3, 7–5	(United States) Daniel Nguyen	(Brazil) Fabiano de Paula (Venezuela) Luis David Martínez	(Mexico) Tigre Hank (Ecuador) Iván Endara (Argentina) Mateo Nicolás Martínez (Colombia) Eduardo Struvay
May 19	Mexico F5 Futures; Ciudad Obregón, Mexico; Hard $15,000	(Puerto Rico) Alex Llompart (Argentina) Mateo Nicolás Martínez; 7–6^{(7–5)}, 6–1	(Brazil) Fabiano de Paula (Canada) Pavel Krainik	(Brazil) Fabiano de Paula (Venezuela) Luis David Martínez	(Mexico) Tigre Hank (Ecuador) Iván Endara (Argentina) Mateo Nicolás Martínez (Colombia) Eduardo Struvay
May 19	Bosnia and Herzegovina F3 Futures; Brčko, Bosnia and Herzegovina; Clay $10,000	(Serbia) Miki Janković; 6–4, 7–6^{(7–3)}	(Serbia) Danilo Petrović	(Bosnia and Herzegovina) Ismar Gorčić (Croatia) Antonio Šančić	(Bosnia and Herzegovina) Tomislav Brkić (Serbia) Marko Tepavac (Serbia) Nikola Ćaćić (Switzerland) Marko Osmakcic
May 19	Bosnia and Herzegovina F3 Futures; Brčko, Bosnia and Herzegovina; Clay $10,000	(Serbia) Nikola Ćaćić (Serbia) Marko Tepavac; 6–4, 1–6, [10–1]	(Serbia) Nikola Ćirić (Serbia) Danilo Petrović	(Bosnia and Herzegovina) Ismar Gorčić (Croatia) Antonio Šančić	(Bosnia and Herzegovina) Tomislav Brkić (Serbia) Marko Tepavac (Serbia) Nikola Ćaćić (Switzerland) Marko Osmakcic
May 19	Croatia F10 Futures; Bol, Croatia; Clay $10,000	(Australia) Maverick Banes; 7–6^{(8–6)}, 4–6, 6–3	(Australia) Jordan Thompson	(China) Wang Chuhan (France) Maxime Chazal	(Croatia) Marin Bradarić (Australia) Matthew Barton (Croatia) Duje Kekez (France) Grégoire Barrère
May 19	Croatia F10 Futures; Bol, Croatia; Clay $10,000	(Australia) Matthew Barton (Australia) Jordan Thompson; 2–6, 6–3, [10–3]	(Australia) Maverick Banes (Australia) Gavin van Peperzeel	(China) Wang Chuhan (France) Maxime Chazal	(Croatia) Marin Bradarić (Australia) Matthew Barton (Croatia) Duje Kekez (France) Grégoire Barrère
May 19	Czech Republic F2 Futures; Most, Czech Republic; Clay $10,000	(Czech Republic) Marek Michalička; 6–4, 6–1	(Germany) Bastian Wagner	(Czech Republic) Marek Jaloviec (Poland) Andriej Kapaś	(Czech Republic) Jan Kunčík (Chile) Ricardo Urzúa Rivera (Poland) Adam Chadaj (Czech Republic) Jan Blecha
May 19	Czech Republic F2 Futures; Most, Czech Republic; Clay $10,000	(Czech Republic) Marek Michalička (Czech Republic) Dominik Süč; 6–2, 7–6^{(8–6)}	(Czech Republic) Lukáš Maršoun (Czech Republic) Libor Salaba	(Czech Republic) Marek Jaloviec (Poland) Andriej Kapaś	(Czech Republic) Jan Kunčík (Chile) Ricardo Urzúa Rivera (Poland) Adam Chadaj (Czech Republic) Jan Blecha
May 19	Italy F15 Futures; Bergamo, Italy; Clay $10,000	(Italy) Roberto Marcora; 5–7, 6–0, 6–1	(Italy) Claudio Fortuna	(Italy) Federico Gaio (Italy) Gianluca Mager	(Italy) Gianluca Naso (Brazil) Daniel Dutra da Silva (Italy) Matteo Trevisan (Argentina) Pablo Galdón
May 19	Italy F15 Futures; Bergamo, Italy; Clay $10,000	(Italy) Lorenzo Frigerio (Italy) Matteo Trevisan; 6–4, 6–4	(Italy) Marco Crugnola (Italy) Alessandro Motti	(Italy) Federico Gaio (Italy) Gianluca Mager	(Italy) Gianluca Naso (Brazil) Daniel Dutra da Silva (Italy) Matteo Trevisan (Argentina) Pablo Galdón
May 19	Morocco F1 Futures; Safi, Morocco; Clay $10,000	(Italy) Gianluigi Quinzi; 6–2, 6–2	(Bolivia) Hugo Dellien	(France) Alexis Musialek (Morocco) Mehdi Jdi	(Chile) Matías Sborowitz (Spain) Marc García Roman (Morocco) Hicham Khaddari (Morocco) Yassine Idmbarek
May 19	Morocco F1 Futures; Safi, Morocco; Clay $10,000	(Bolivia) Hugo Dellien (Argentina) Leandro Portmann; 6–1, 7–6^{(14–12)}	(Morocco) Talal Ouahabi (Morocco) Taha Tifnouti	(France) Alexis Musialek (Morocco) Mehdi Jdi	(Chile) Matías Sborowitz (Spain) Marc García Roman (Morocco) Hicham Khaddari (Morocco) Yassine Idmbarek
May 19	Portugal F5 Futures; Pombal, Portugal; Hard $10,000	(Portugal) Frederico Ferreira Silva; 6–0, 6–3	(Portugal) João Domingues	(Spain) David Vega Hernández (Portugal) Romain Barbosa	(Portugal) João Monteiro (Portugal) André Gaspar Murta (Portugal) Nuno Deus (Brazil) Alexandre Tsuchiya
May 19	Portugal F5 Futures; Pombal, Portugal; Hard $10,000	Not played.		(Spain) David Vega Hernández (Portugal) Romain Barbosa	(Portugal) João Monteiro (Portugal) André Gaspar Murta (Portugal) Nuno Deus (Brazil) Alexandre Tsuchiya
May 19	Romania F2 Futures; Bucharest, Romania; Clay $10,000	(Moldova) Maxim Dubarenco; 5–7, 6–3, 6–1	(Romania) Dragoș Dima	(Spain) Carlos Gómez-Herrera (Romania) Andrei Cociașu	(Germany) Andreas Mies (Brazil) João Pedro Sorgi (United Kingdom) Matthew Short (Croatia) Viktor Galović
May 19	Romania F2 Futures; Bucharest, Romania; Clay $10,000	(Germany) Andreas Mies (Germany) Demian Raab; 7–5, 5–7, [10–7]	(Romania) Nicolae Frunză (Romania) Petru-Alexandru Luncanu	(Spain) Carlos Gómez-Herrera (Romania) Andrei Cociașu	(Germany) Andreas Mies (Brazil) João Pedro Sorgi (United Kingdom) Matthew Short (Croatia) Viktor Galović
May 19	Slovenia F1 Futures; Koper, Slovenia; Clay $10,000	(Slovenia) Janez Semrajc; 3–6, 6–3, 6–4	(Germany) Maximilian Marterer	(Germany) Kevin Krawietz (Austria) Patrick Ofner	(Italy) Antonio Mastrelia (Italy) Daniele Giorgini (Croatia) Filip Veger (Italy) Giulio Torroni
May 19	Slovenia F1 Futures; Koper, Slovenia; Clay $10,000	(United States) Adham El-Effendi (United Kingdom) Darren Walsh; 7–6^{(7–5)}, 6–3	(Austria) Sebastian Bader (United States) Erik Elliott	(Germany) Kevin Krawietz (Austria) Patrick Ofner	(Italy) Antonio Mastrelia (Italy) Daniele Giorgini (Croatia) Filip Veger (Italy) Giulio Torroni
May 19	Spain F10 Futures; Vic, Spain; Clay $10,000	(Belgium) Yannik Reuter; 3–6, 6–4, 6–2	(United States) Noah Rubin	(Spain) Albert Alcaraz Ivorra (Spain) Juan Lizariturry	(United States) Frances Tiafoe (Japan) Takashi Saito (United States) Collin Altamirano (Spain) Marcos Giraldi Requena
May 19	Spain F10 Futures; Vic, Spain; Clay $10,000	(Spain) Sergio Martos Gornés (Spain) Pol Toledo Bagué; 6–2, 7–5	(United States) Stefan Kozlov (United States) Noah Rubin	(Spain) Albert Alcaraz Ivorra (Spain) Juan Lizariturry	(United States) Frances Tiafoe (Japan) Takashi Saito (United States) Collin Altamirano (Spain) Marcos Giraldi Requena
May 19	Thailand F4 Futures; Bangkok, Thailand; Hard $10,000	(Thailand) Danai Udomchoke; 6–3, 7–5	(Australia) Dayne Kelly	(China) Li Zhe (Thailand) Kittipong Wachiramanowong	(Japan) Masato Shiga (Australia) Jacob Grills (Indonesia) Christopher Rungkat (China) Bowen Ouyang
May 19	Thailand F4 Futures; Bangkok, Thailand; Hard $10,000	(China) Li Zhe (Indonesia) Christopher Rungkat; 6–0, 6–1	(Thailand) Phassawit Burapharitta (Thailand) Grittaboon Prahmanee	(China) Li Zhe (Thailand) Kittipong Wachiramanowong	(Japan) Masato Shiga (Australia) Jacob Grills (Indonesia) Christopher Rungkat (China) Bowen Ouyang
May 19	Tunisia F2 Futures; Sousse, Tunisia; Hard $10,000	(Spain) David Pérez Sanz; 6–7^{(2–7)}, 6–3, 6–4	(Italy) Stefano Napolitano	(Germany) Matthias Wunner (France) Rémi Boutillier	(Germany) Mats Moraing (France) Rudy Coco (France) Maxime Tchoutakian (Republic of Ireland) Sam Barry
May 19	Tunisia F2 Futures; Sousse, Tunisia; Hard $10,000	(Republic of Ireland) Sam Barry (Italy) Claudio Grassi; 6–4, 7–6^{(7–2)}	(Tunisia) Moez Echargui (Tunisia) Slim Hamza	(Germany) Matthias Wunner (France) Rémi Boutillier	(Germany) Mats Moraing (France) Rudy Coco (France) Maxime Tchoutakian (Republic of Ireland) Sam Barry
May 19	Turkey F17 Futures; Antalya-Belconti, Turkey; Hard $10,000	(Austria) Bastian Trinker; 6–0, 4–6, 6–2	(Venezuela) Ricardo Rodríguez	(United States) Jared Donaldson (Ukraine) Marat Deviatiarov	(Switzerland) Adrian Bodmer (Kazakhstan) Denis Yevseyev (Lithuania) Julius Tverijonas (Spain) Jaime Pulgar García
May 19	Turkey F17 Futures; Antalya-Belconti, Turkey; Hard $10,000	(Belarus) Artur Dubinski (Belarus) Vladzimir Kruk; 7–6^{(17–15)}, 3–6, [11–9]	(Ukraine) Marat Deviatiarov (Russia) Andrei Plotniy	(United States) Jared Donaldson (Ukraine) Marat Deviatiarov	(Switzerland) Adrian Bodmer (Kazakhstan) Denis Yevseyev (Lithuania) Julius Tverijonas (Spain) Jaime Pulgar García
May 19	Ukraine F5 Futures; Rivne, Ukraine; Clay $10,000	(Germany) Richard Becker; 6–0, 2–6, 7–5	(Russia) Ivan Nedelko	(Ukraine) Volodymyr Uzhylovskyi (Ukraine) Vladyslav Manafov	(Poland) Piotr Gadomski (Ukraine) Dmytro Badanov (France) Constant Lestienne (Ukraine) Vadim Alekseenko
May 19	Ukraine F5 Futures; Rivne, Ukraine; Clay $10,000	(Ukraine) Yurii Dzhavakian (Ukraine) Volodymyr Uzhylovskyi; 6–2, 6–4	(United States) Nikita Kryvonos (Bulgaria) Vasko Mladenov	(Ukraine) Volodymyr Uzhylovskyi (Ukraine) Vladyslav Manafov	(Poland) Piotr Gadomski (Ukraine) Dmytro Badanov (France) Constant Lestienne (Ukraine) Vadim Alekseenko
May 26	Korea F3 Futures; Changwon, South Korea; Hard $15,000	(South Korea) Chung Hyeon; 6–1, 2–6, 7–5	(South Korea) Cho Min-hyeok	(South Korea) Kim Cheong-eui (South Korea) Dylan Seong-kwan Kim	(South Korea) Chung Hong (South Korea) Song Min-kyu (South Korea) Nam Ji-sung (South Korea) Kang Ho-min
May 26	Korea F3 Futures; Changwon, South Korea; Hard $15,000	(South Korea) Chung Hyeon (South Korea) Nam Ji-sung; 6–3, 6–3	(South Korea) Cho Soong-jae (South Korea) Dylan Seong-kwan Kim	(South Korea) Kim Cheong-eui (South Korea) Dylan Seong-kwan Kim	(South Korea) Chung Hong (South Korea) Song Min-kyu (South Korea) Nam Ji-sung (South Korea) Kang Ho-min
May 26	Romania F3 Futures; Bacău, Romania; Clay $15,000+H	(Sweden) Elias Ymer; 3–6, 7–6^{(7–2)}, 7–5	(Dominican Republic) José Hernández	(Moldova) Maxim Dubarenco (Spain) Carlos Gómez-Herrera	(Moldova) Radu Albot (Brazil) Thiago Monteiro (Romania) Costin Pavăl (Romania) Vasile Antonescu
May 26	Romania F3 Futures; Bacău, Romania; Clay $15,000+H	(Romania) Patrick Grigoriu (Romania) Costin Pavăl; 6–1, 6–4	(Spain) Enrique López Pérez (Brazil) João Walendowsky	(Moldova) Maxim Dubarenco (Spain) Carlos Gómez-Herrera	(Moldova) Radu Albot (Brazil) Thiago Monteiro (Romania) Costin Pavăl (Romania) Vasile Antonescu
May 26	Russia F3 Futures; Moscow, Russia; Clay $15,000	(Russia) Andrey Rublev; 6–0, 6–4	(Russia) Stanislav Vovk	(Netherlands) Boy Westerhof (Russia) Alexey Vatutin	(Russia) Victor Baluda (Russia) Philipp Davydenko (Russia) Ilya Lebedev (Netherlands) Antal van der Duim
May 26	Russia F3 Futures; Moscow, Russia; Clay $15,000	(Belarus) Egor Gerasimov (Russia) Stanislav Vovk; 2–6, 6–4, [10–8]	(Russia) Denis Matsukevich (Russia) Andrey Rublev	(Netherlands) Boy Westerhof (Russia) Alexey Vatutin	(Russia) Victor Baluda (Russia) Philipp Davydenko (Russia) Ilya Lebedev (Netherlands) Antal van der Duim
May 26	Bosnia and Herzegovina F4 Futures; Kiseljak, Bosnia and Herzegovina; Clay $10,000	(Bosnia and Herzegovina) Mirza Bašić; 7–5, 6–4	(Bosnia and Herzegovina) Tomislav Brkić	(Germany) Peter Torebko (Serbia) Peđa Krstin	(Croatia) Luka Zaninović (Serbia) Danilo Petrović (France) Samuel Bensoussan (France) François-Arthur Vibert
May 26	Bosnia and Herzegovina F4 Futures; Kiseljak, Bosnia and Herzegovina; Clay $10,000	(Bosnia and Herzegovina) Tomislav Brkić (Croatia) Ante Marinčić; 6–2, 6–2	(Montenegro) Ljubomir Čelebić (Italy) Giorgio Portaluri	(Germany) Peter Torebko (Serbia) Peđa Krstin	(Croatia) Luka Zaninović (Serbia) Danilo Petrović (France) Samuel Bensoussan (France) François-Arthur Vibert
May 26	Croatia F11 Futures; Bol, Croatia; Clay $10,000	(Australia) Maverick Banes; 6–1, 6–3	(Australia) Jake Eames	(United Kingdom) Jonny O'Mara (Japan) Ryūsei Makiguchi	(Australia) Alex Bolt (Australia) Aleksandar Vukic (France) Maxime Chazal (Australia) Gavin van Peperzeel
May 26	Croatia F11 Futures; Bol, Croatia; Clay $10,000	(Russia) Evgeny Karlovskiy (Croatia) Lovro Zovko; 6–3, 6–3	(Argentina) Tomás Lipovšek Puches (Japan) Ryūsei Makiguchi	(United Kingdom) Jonny O'Mara (Japan) Ryūsei Makiguchi	(Australia) Alex Bolt (Australia) Aleksandar Vukic (France) Maxime Chazal (Australia) Gavin van Peperzeel
May 26	Czech Republic F3 Futures; Jablonec nad Nisou, Czech Republic; Clay $10,000	(Czech Republic) Marek Michalička; 6–1, 6–3	(Slovakia) Adrian Sikora	(Czech Republic) Dušan Lojda (Poland) Grzegorz Panfil	(Czech Republic) Jan Mertl (Czech Republic) Roman Jebavý (Czech Republic) Dominik Süč (Bulgaria) Alexandar Lazov
May 26	Czech Republic F3 Futures; Jablonec nad Nisou, Czech Republic; Clay $10,000	(Czech Republic) Marek Michalička (Czech Republic) Dominik Süč; 3–6, 6–4, [10–3]	(Poland) Marcin Gawron (Poland) Grzegorz Panfil	(Czech Republic) Dušan Lojda (Poland) Grzegorz Panfil	(Czech Republic) Jan Mertl (Czech Republic) Roman Jebavý (Czech Republic) Dominik Süč (Bulgaria) Alexandar Lazov
May 26	Egypt F19 Futures; Sharm El Sheikh, Egypt; Clay $10,000	(Spain) José Checa Calvo; 6–1, 6–3	(Italy) Riccardo Sinicropi	(Egypt) Sherif Sabry (Egypt) Karim Hossam	(Egypt) Mohamed Safwat (Egypt) Karim-Mohamed Maamoun (Syria) Issam Haitham Taweel (Serbia) Marko Tepavac
May 26	Egypt F19 Futures; Sharm El Sheikh, Egypt; Clay $10,000	(Argentina) Sebastián Exequiel Pini (Argentina) Leandro Portmann; 6–0, 7–6^{(7–3)}	(North Macedonia) Shendrit Deari (North Macedonia) Tomislav Jotovski	(Egypt) Sherif Sabry (Egypt) Karim Hossam	(Egypt) Mohamed Safwat (Egypt) Karim-Mohamed Maamoun (Syria) Issam Haitham Taweel (Serbia) Marko Tepavac
May 26	Guam F1 Futures; Tumon, Guam; Hard $10,000	(Japan) Takuto Niki; 6–7^{(6–8)}, 6–2, 7–5	(India) Jeevan Nedunchezhiyan	(Japan) Yuuya Kibi (Japan) Bumpei Sato	(Japan) Gengo Kikuchi (Japan) Katsuki Nagao (Japan) Ko Suzuki (South Korea) Jun Woong-sun
May 26	Guam F1 Futures; Tumon, Guam; Hard $10,000	(Japan) Takuto Niki (Japan) Bumpei Sato; 6–1, 6–3	(Japan) Yuuya Kibi (Japan) Tomohiro Masabayashi	(Japan) Yuuya Kibi (Japan) Bumpei Sato	(Japan) Gengo Kikuchi (Japan) Katsuki Nagao (Japan) Ko Suzuki (South Korea) Jun Woong-sun
May 26	Italy F16 Futures; Cesena, Italy; Clay $10,000+H	(Italy) Luca Vanni; 4–6, 6–3, 6–1	(United States) Mitchell Krueger	(Australia) Benjamin Mitchell (Croatia) Nikola Mektić	(Italy) Filippo Leonardi (Italy) Walter Trusendi (Argentina) Pablo Galdón (Brazil) Pedro Sakamoto
May 26	Italy F16 Futures; Cesena, Italy; Clay $10,000+H	(Italy) Walter Trusendi (Italy) Luca Vanni; 6–4, 1–6, [12–10]	(Italy) Daniele Giorgini (Italy) Matteo Volante	(Australia) Benjamin Mitchell (Croatia) Nikola Mektić	(Italy) Filippo Leonardi (Italy) Walter Trusendi (Argentina) Pablo Galdón (Brazil) Pedro Sakamoto
May 26	Morocco F2 Futures; Casablanca, Morocco; Clay $10,000	(Italy) Gianluigi Quinzi; 6–2, 6–3	(France) Gianni Mina	(France) Martin Vaïsse (Bolivia) Hugo Dellien	(Switzerland) Keivon Tabrizi (Argentina) Valentin Florez (Burundi) Guy Orly Iradukunda (Spain) Juan Lizariturry
May 26	Morocco F2 Futures; Casablanca, Morocco; Clay $10,000	(Morocco) Yassine Idmbarek (Morocco) Younès Rachidi; 6–1, 6–2	(Mali) Seydou Diallo (Tunisia) Aziz Dougaz	(France) Martin Vaïsse (Bolivia) Hugo Dellien	(Switzerland) Keivon Tabrizi (Argentina) Valentin Florez (Burundi) Guy Orly Iradukunda (Spain) Juan Lizariturry
May 26	Portugal F6 Futures; Caldas da Rainha, Portugal; Hard $10,000	(United Kingdom) Alexander Ward; 6–3, 6–2	(Brazil) Thales Turini	(Spain) Ricardo Ojeda Lara (United Kingdom) Ashley Hewitt	(United Kingdom) Neil Pauffley (Portugal) João Domingues (Portugal) Frederico Ferreira Silva (France) Constant Lestienne
May 26	Portugal F6 Futures; Caldas da Rainha, Portugal; Hard $10,000	(Portugal) Gonçalo Falcão (Portugal) Gonçalo Pereira; 4–6, 6–3, [10–5]	(Portugal) Romain Barbosa (Portugal) Frederico Ferreira Silva	(Spain) Ricardo Ojeda Lara (United Kingdom) Ashley Hewitt	(United Kingdom) Neil Pauffley (Portugal) João Domingues (Portugal) Frederico Ferreira Silva (France) Constant Lestienne
May 26	Slovenia F2 Futures; Maribor, Slovenia; Clay $10,000	(Slovakia) Jozef Kovalík; 7–6^{(7–2)}, 6–1	(Belgium) Julien Cagnina	(Belgium) Germain Gigounon (Germany) Kevin Krawietz	(Slovenia) Aljaž Radinski (Germany) Daniel Uhlig (United States) Erik Elliott (Portugal) Gonçalo Oliveira
May 26	Slovenia F2 Futures; Maribor, Slovenia; Clay $10,000	(United States) Erik Elliott (Germany) Kevin Krawietz; 6–0, 7–5	(Slovenia) Miha Mlakar (Slovenia) Tomislav Ternar	(Belgium) Germain Gigounon (Germany) Kevin Krawietz	(Slovenia) Aljaž Radinski (Germany) Daniel Uhlig (United States) Erik Elliott (Portugal) Gonçalo Oliveira
May 26	South Africa F1 Futures; Sun City, South Africa; Hard $10,000	(South Africa) Fritz Wolmarans; 3–6, 6–3, 7–6^{(7–3)}	(South Africa) Tucker Vorster	(Sweden) Jacob Adaktusson (United States) Tyler Hochwalt	(South Africa) Ruan Roelofse (South Africa) Damon Gooch (Sweden) Milos Sekulic (Brazil) Augusto Laranja
May 26	South Africa F1 Futures; Sun City, South Africa; Hard $10,000	(South Africa) Ruan Roelofse (South Africa) Fritz Wolmarans; 6–1, 6–4	(Sweden) Jacob Adaktusson (Sweden) Milos Sekulic	(Sweden) Jacob Adaktusson (United States) Tyler Hochwalt	(South Africa) Ruan Roelofse (South Africa) Damon Gooch (Sweden) Milos Sekulic (Brazil) Augusto Laranja
May 26	Spain F11 Futures; Santa Margarida de Montbui, Spain; Clay $10,000	(Spain) Roberto Ortega Olmedo; 7–5, 6–1	(Colombia) Juan Sebastián Gómez	(Spain) Sergio Martos Gornés (Spain) Pol Toledo Bagué	(Brazil) José Pereira (Japan) Ryota Kishi (Spain) Oriol Roca Batalla (Japan) Takashi Saito
May 26	Spain F11 Futures; Santa Margarida de Montbui, Spain; Clay $10,000	(Spain) Sergio Martos Gornés (Spain) Pol Toledo Bagué; 7–5, 2–6, [10–6]	(Spain) Óscar Burrieza (Spain) Roberto Ortega Olmedo	(Spain) Sergio Martos Gornés (Spain) Pol Toledo Bagué	(Brazil) José Pereira (Japan) Ryota Kishi (Spain) Oriol Roca Batalla (Japan) Takashi Saito
May 26	Thailand F5 Futures; Bangkok, Thailand; Hard $10,000	(Japan) Toshihide Matsui; 6–4, 6–1	(Indonesia) Christopher Rungkat	(Brazil) Henrique Cunha (Australia) Jacob Grills	(Thailand) Pruchya Isaro (China) Li Zhe (Thailand) Phassawit Burapharitta (Japan) Arata Onozawa
May 26	Thailand F5 Futures; Bangkok, Thailand; Hard $10,000	(Thailand) Sonchat Ratiwatana (Thailand) Danai Udomchoke; 6–2, 6–3	(Thailand) Pruchya Isaro (Thailand) Nuttanon Kadchapanan	(Brazil) Henrique Cunha (Australia) Jacob Grills	(Thailand) Pruchya Isaro (China) Li Zhe (Thailand) Phassawit Burapharitta (Japan) Arata Onozawa
May 26	Tunisia F3 Futures; Sousse, Tunisia; Hard $10,000	(France) Rémi Boutillier; 6–3, 6–1	(Spain) David Pérez Sanz	(France) Maxime Tchoutakian (France) Théo Fournerie	(Republic of Ireland) Sam Barry (Germany) Mats Moraing (Germany) Matthias Wunner (Czech Republic) Dominik Kellovský
May 26	Tunisia F3 Futures; Sousse, Tunisia; Hard $10,000	(Republic of Ireland) Sam Barry (Italy) Claudio Grassi; 6–2, 6–4	(France) Rémi Boutillier (France) Maxime Tchoutakian	(France) Maxime Tchoutakian (France) Théo Fournerie	(Republic of Ireland) Sam Barry (Germany) Mats Moraing (Germany) Matthias Wunner (Czech Republic) Dominik Kellovský
May 26	Turkey F18 Futures; Antalya-Belconti, Turkey; Hard $10,000	(United Kingdom) David Rice; 4–6, 6–4, 6–3	(Turkey) Cem İlkel	(United Kingdom) Cameron Norrie (Ukraine) Marat Deviatiarov	(Lithuania) Julius Tverijonas (Kazakhstan) Denis Yevseyev (United States) Jared Donaldson (Turkey) Anıl Yüksel
May 26	Turkey F18 Futures; Antalya-Belconti, Turkey; Hard $10,000	(Ukraine) Marat Deviatiarov (Turkey) Barış Ergüden; 7–5, 6–2	(Turkey) Cem İlkel (Turkey) Efe Yurtacan	(United Kingdom) Cameron Norrie (Ukraine) Marat Deviatiarov	(Lithuania) Julius Tverijonas (Kazakhstan) Denis Yevseyev (United States) Jared Donaldson (Turkey) Anıl Yüksel
May 26	Ukraine F6 Futures; Rivne, Ukraine; Clay $10,000	(Spain) Marc Giner; 6–2, 4–6, 7–5	(Russia) Ivan Nedelko	(Ukraine) Vladyslav Manafov (Ukraine) Vadim Alekseenko	(United States) Nikita Kryvonos (Ukraine) Dmytro Badanov (Ukraine) Denys Mylokostov (Ukraine) Yurii Dzhavakian
May 26	Ukraine F6 Futures; Rivne, Ukraine; Clay $10,000	(Ukraine) Vadim Alekseenko (Ukraine) Stanislav Poplavsky; 6–1, 0–6, [10–3]	(Ukraine) Vladyslav Manafov (Russia) Ivan Nedelko	(Ukraine) Vladyslav Manafov (Ukraine) Vadim Alekseenko	(United States) Nikita Kryvonos (Ukraine) Dmytro Badanov (Ukraine) Denys Mylokostov (Ukraine) Yurii Dzhavakian

=== June ===
Week of	Tournament	Winner	Runners-up	Semifinalists	Quarterfinalists
June 2	China F6 Futures; Fuzhou, China; Hard $15,000	(China) Bai Yan; 6–2, 6–1	(China) Li Zhe	(United States) Nicolas Meister (Chinese Taipei) Yang Tsung-hua	(Chinese Taipei) Huang Liang-chi (United States) Evan King (China) Wang Chuhan (Japan) Kaichi Uchida
June 2	China F6 Futures; Fuzhou, China; Hard $15,000	(China) Gong Maoxin (China) Li Zhe; 6–1, 6–3	(Chinese Taipei) Peng Hsien-yin (Chinese Taipei) Yang Tsung-hua	(United States) Nicolas Meister (Chinese Taipei) Yang Tsung-hua	(Chinese Taipei) Huang Liang-chi (United States) Evan King (China) Wang Chuhan (Japan) Kaichi Uchida
June 2	Italy F17 Futures; Parma, Italy; Clay $15,000	(Italy) Matteo Trevisan; 6–3, 6–3	(Brazil) Thales Turini	(Italy) Luca Vanni (Italy) Alberto Brizzi	(United States) Mitchell Krueger (Italy) Amerigo Contini (Slovakia) Ivo Klec (Serbia) Miljan Zekić
June 2	Italy F17 Futures; Parma, Italy; Clay $15,000	(Italy) Lorenzo Frigerio (Italy) Matteo Trevisan; 6–3, 6–2	(United States) Bjorn Fratangelo (United States) Mitchell Krueger	(Italy) Luca Vanni (Italy) Alberto Brizzi	(United States) Mitchell Krueger (Italy) Amerigo Contini (Slovakia) Ivo Klec (Serbia) Miljan Zekić
June 2	Korea F4 Futures; Daegu, South Korea; Hard $15,000	(South Korea) Kim Chong-eui; 7–5, 7–6^{(7–5)}	(South Korea) Chung Hyeon	(South Korea) Cho Min-hyeok (South Korea) Nam Ji-sung	(South Korea) Cho Soong-jae (South Korea) Kim Jae-hwan (South Korea) Jun Woong-sun (South Korea) Dylan Seong-kwan Kim
June 2	Korea F4 Futures; Daegu, South Korea; Hard $15,000	(South Korea) Kim Yu-seob (South Korea) Lim Hyung-chan; 6–3, 3–6, [10–6]	(South Korea) Chung Hong (South Korea) Noh Sang-woo	(South Korea) Cho Min-hyeok (South Korea) Nam Ji-sung	(South Korea) Cho Soong-jae (South Korea) Kim Jae-hwan (South Korea) Jun Woong-sun (South Korea) Dylan Seong-kwan Kim
June 2	Russia F4 Futures; Moscow, Russia; Clay $15,000	(Russia) Konstantin Kravchuk; 6–4, 7–6^{(7–2)}	(Russia) Philipp Davydenko	(Russia) Aslan Karatsev (Russia) Roman Safiullin	(Netherlands) Antal van der Duim (Russia) Alexey Vatutin (Russia) Valery Rudnev (Russia) Ilya Polonskiy
June 2	Russia F4 Futures; Moscow, Russia; Clay $15,000	(Russia) Aslan Karatsev (Russia) Richard Muzaev; 6–2, 6–3	(Russia) Evgeny Elistratov (Russia) Vladimir Polyakov	(Russia) Aslan Karatsev (Russia) Roman Safiullin	(Netherlands) Antal van der Duim (Russia) Alexey Vatutin (Russia) Valery Rudnev (Russia) Ilya Polonskiy
June 2	Belgium F1 Futures; Damme, Belgium; Clay $10,000	(Belgium) Joris De Loore; 7–5, 6–3	(Belgium) Steve Darcis	(Brazil) José Pereira (Germany) Nils Langer	(Belgium) Julien Dubail (Germany) Florian Fallert (Belgium) Jeroen Vanneste (Belgium) Yannick Vandenbulcke
June 2	Belgium F1 Futures; Damme, Belgium; Clay $10,000	(Germany) Florian Fallert (Germany) Nils Langer; 7–5, 6–1	(Germany) Andreas Mies (Germany) Oscar Otte	(Brazil) José Pereira (Germany) Nils Langer	(Belgium) Julien Dubail (Germany) Florian Fallert (Belgium) Jeroen Vanneste (Belgium) Yannick Vandenbulcke
June 2	Croatia F12 Futures; Bol, Croatia; Clay $10,000	(Australia) Christopher O'Connell; 7–6^{(7–4)}, 3–6, 7–6^{(7–1)}	(Argentina) Gaston Arturo Grimolizzi	(Argentina) Tomás Lipovšek Puches (Sweden) Daniel Windahl	(Australia) Gavin van Peperzeel (Montenegro) Ljubomir Čelebić (Australia) Jake Eames (France) Hugo Nys
June 2	Croatia F12 Futures; Bol, Croatia; Clay $10,000	(Argentina) Gaston Arturo Grimolizzi (Italy) Giorgio Portaluri; 3–6, 7–5, [10–4]	(Argentina) Tomás Lipovšek Puches (Japan) Ryūsei Makiguchi	(Argentina) Tomás Lipovšek Puches (Sweden) Daniel Windahl	(Australia) Gavin van Peperzeel (Montenegro) Ljubomir Čelebić (Australia) Jake Eames (France) Hugo Nys
June 2	Egypt F20 Futures; Sharm El Sheikh, Egypt; Clay $10,000	(Spain) Marc Giner; 6–4, 2–6, 6–2	(Egypt) Mohamed Safwat	(Italy) Riccardo Sinicropi (Syria) Issam Al Tawil	(Italy) Antonio Campo (Egypt) Sherif Sabry (Egypt) Karim Hossam (Argentina) Valentin Florez
June 2	Egypt F20 Futures; Sharm El Sheikh, Egypt; Clay $10,000	(Argentina) Valentin Florez (Argentina) Leandro Portmann; 2–6, 7–5, [10–7]	(Egypt) Karim-Mohamed Maamoun (Syria) Issam Al Tawil	(Italy) Riccardo Sinicropi (Syria) Issam Al Tawil	(Italy) Antonio Campo (Egypt) Sherif Sabry (Egypt) Karim Hossam (Argentina) Valentin Florez
June 2	Hungary F1 Futures; Budapest, Hungary; Clay $10,000	(Sweden) Patrik Rosenholm; 6–3, 5–7, 6–4	(Serbia) Laslo Djere	(Austria) Pascal Brunner (Switzerland) Riccardo Maiga	(Serbia) Denis Bejtulahi (Hungary) Péter Nagy (Hungary) Viktor Filipenkó (Croatia) Matej Sabanov
June 2	Hungary F1 Futures; Budapest, Hungary; Clay $10,000	(Sweden) Isak Arvidsson (Sweden) Robin Olin; 6–4, 2–6, [10–6]	(Switzerland) Riccardo Maiga (Finland) Henrik Sillanpää	(Austria) Pascal Brunner (Switzerland) Riccardo Maiga	(Serbia) Denis Bejtulahi (Hungary) Péter Nagy (Hungary) Viktor Filipenkó (Croatia) Matej Sabanov
June 2	Israel F7 Futures; Herzliya, Israel; Hard $10,000	(France) Yannick Jankovits; 6–4, 2–0 retired	(United Kingdom) Cameron Norrie	(United States) Peter Kobelt (United States) Devin McCarthy	(Czech Republic) Michal Schmid (France) Matthieu Roy (United Kingdom) Joshua Ward-Hibbert (Greece) Alexandros Jakupovic
June 2	Israel F7 Futures; Herzliya, Israel; Hard $10,000	(Greece) Alexandros Jakupovic (Czech Republic) Michal Schmid; 3–6, 6–3, [10–5]	(United States) Peter Kobelt (United States) Devin McCarthy	(United States) Peter Kobelt (United States) Devin McCarthy	(Czech Republic) Michal Schmid (France) Matthieu Roy (United Kingdom) Joshua Ward-Hibbert (Greece) Alexandros Jakupovic
June 2	Japan F5 Futures; Karuizawa, Japan; Clay $10,000	(Japan) Takuto Niki; 6–4, 3–6, 6–1	(Japan) Yuuya Kibi	(Japan) Keita Koyama (Japan) Gengo Kikuchi	(Chinese Taipei) Hung Jui-chen (Japan) Bumpei Sato (Japan) Sho Katayama (Japan) Hiromasa Oku
June 2	Japan F5 Futures; Karuizawa, Japan; Clay $10,000	(Japan) Sho Katayama (Japan) Bumpei Sato; 7–5, 6–2	(Chinese Taipei) Wang Chieh-fu (Chinese Taipei) Yang Shao-chi	(Japan) Keita Koyama (Japan) Gengo Kikuchi	(Chinese Taipei) Hung Jui-chen (Japan) Bumpei Sato (Japan) Sho Katayama (Japan) Hiromasa Oku
June 2	Morocco F3 Futures; Rabat, Morocco; Clay $10,000	(France) Gianni Mina; 6–3, 3–6, 6–3	(France) Martin Vaïsse	(Netherlands) Fabian van der Lans (France) Maxime Hamou	(Morocco) Younès Rachidi (France) Maxime Chazal (France) Tak Khunn Wang (Morocco) Yassine Idmbarek
June 2	Morocco F3 Futures; Rabat, Morocco; Clay $10,000	(Tunisia) Aziz Dougaz (Burundi) Guy Orly Iradukunda; 3–6, 6–1, [10–6]	(France) Maxime Chazal (France) Tak Khunn Wang	(Netherlands) Fabian van der Lans (France) Maxime Hamou	(Morocco) Younès Rachidi (France) Maxime Chazal (France) Tak Khunn Wang (Morocco) Yassine Idmbarek
June 2	Poland F1 Futures; Koszalin, Poland; Clay $10,000	(Poland) Grzegorz Panfil; 7–5, 6–2	(Poland) Marcin Gawron	(Czech Republic) Dušan Lojda (Chile) Cristóbal Saavedra Corvalán	(Latvia) Mārtiņš Podžus (Poland) Paweł Ciaś (Czech Republic) Václav Šafránek (Chile) Ricardo Urzúa Rivera
June 2	Poland F1 Futures; Koszalin, Poland; Clay $10,000	(Chile) Cristóbal Saavedra Corvalán (Chile) Ricardo Urzúa Rivera; 6–7^{(3–7)}, 7–5, [10–8]	(Poland) Marcin Gawron (Poland) Grzegorz Panfil	(Czech Republic) Dušan Lojda (Chile) Cristóbal Saavedra Corvalán	(Latvia) Mārtiņš Podžus (Poland) Paweł Ciaś (Czech Republic) Václav Šafránek (Chile) Ricardo Urzúa Rivera
June 2	Slovenia F3 Futures; Litija, Slovenia; Clay $10,000	(Serbia) Miki Janković; 6–2, 3–1, ret.	(Belgium) Julien Cagnina	(Italy) Erik Crepaldi (Slovenia) Mike Urbanija	(Czech Republic) Roman Jebavý (Slovenia) Tomislav Ternar (Austria) Nicolas Reissig (France) Jules Marie
June 2	Slovenia F3 Futures; Litija, Slovenia; Clay $10,000	(Belgium) Julien Cagnina (Italy) Pietro Licciardi; 6–4, 6–3	(Austria) Lukas Jastraunig (Austria) Nicolas Reissig	(Italy) Erik Crepaldi (Slovenia) Mike Urbanija	(Czech Republic) Roman Jebavý (Slovenia) Tomislav Ternar (Austria) Nicolas Reissig (France) Jules Marie
June 2	South Africa F2 Futures; Sun City, South Africa; Hard $10,000	(South Africa) Nikala Scholtz; 6–4, 6–3	(South Africa) Tucker Vorster	(South Africa) Dean O'Brien (South Africa) Fritz Wolmarans	(South Africa) Michael Grant (South Africa) Ruan Roelofse (Italy) Stefano Napolitano (Sweden) Milos Sekulic
June 2	South Africa F2 Futures; Sun City, South Africa; Hard $10,000	(South Africa) Nikala Scholtz (South Africa) Tucker Vorster; 6–3, 6–4	(Zimbabwe) Mark Fynn (South Africa) Damon Gooch	(South Africa) Dean O'Brien (South Africa) Fritz Wolmarans	(South Africa) Michael Grant (South Africa) Ruan Roelofse (Italy) Stefano Napolitano (Sweden) Milos Sekulic
June 2	Spain F12 Futures; Madrid, Spain; Clay $10,000	(Chile) Cristian Garín; 3–6, 6–3, 6–1	(Chile) Nicolás Jarry	(Spain) Roberto Ortega Olmedo (Spain) Pol Toledo Bagué	(Spain) Ricardo Villacorta Alonso (France) Alexis Musialek (Spain) Oriol Roca Batalla (Spain) Juan Samuel Arauzo Martínez
June 2	Spain F12 Futures; Madrid, Spain; Clay $10,000	(Spain) Sergio Martos Gornés (Spain) Pol Toledo Bagué; 6–2, 6–4	(Spain) Eduard Esteve Lobato (Spain) Oriol Roca Batalla	(Spain) Roberto Ortega Olmedo (Spain) Pol Toledo Bagué	(Spain) Ricardo Villacorta Alonso (France) Alexis Musialek (Spain) Oriol Roca Batalla (Spain) Juan Samuel Arauzo Martínez
June 2	Thailand F6 Futures; Bangkok, Thailand; Hard $10,000	(Brazil) Henrique Cunha; 6–0, 6–0	(Thailand) Phassawit Burapharitta	(Indonesia) Christopher Rungkat (Japan) Toshihide Matsui	(Thailand) Danai Udomchoke (United States) Thomas Schubert (Thailand) Singekrawee Wattanakul (Australia) Jonathon Cooper
June 2	Thailand F6 Futures; Bangkok, Thailand; Hard $10,000	(Thailand) Pruchya Isaro (Thailand) Nuttanon Kadchapanan; 6–4, 6–7^{(5–7)}, [10–8]	(United States) Andre Dome (Indonesia) Christopher Rungkat	(Indonesia) Christopher Rungkat (Japan) Toshihide Matsui	(Thailand) Danai Udomchoke (United States) Thomas Schubert (Thailand) Singekrawee Wattanakul (Australia) Jonathon Cooper
June 2	Turkey F19 Futures; Bodrum, Turkey; Clay $10,000	(United States) Jared Donaldson; 6–3, 6–4	(Serbia) Nikola Milojević	(France) Grégoire Barrère (Spain) Jaime Pulgar García	(Brazil) Alex Blumenberg (Slovakia) Filip Horanský (Turkey) Barış Ergüden (Italy) Matteo Marfia
June 2	Turkey F19 Futures; Bodrum, Turkey; Clay $10,000	(Turkey) Cem İlkel (Turkey) Efe Yurtacan; 6–4, 7–5	(Turkey) Barış Ergüden (Turkey) Anıl Yüksel	(France) Grégoire Barrère (Spain) Jaime Pulgar García	(Brazil) Alex Blumenberg (Slovakia) Filip Horanský (Turkey) Barış Ergüden (Italy) Matteo Marfia
June 9	Belgium F2 Futures; Binche, Belgium; Clay $15,000	(United Kingdom) Alexander Ward; 2–6, 6–3, 7–6^{(9–7)}	(Portugal) Frederico Ferreira Silva	(Germany) Florian Fallert (Russia) Philipp Davydenko	(Belgium) Germain Gigounon (Belgium) Arthur De Greef (Belgium) Alexandre Folie (Belgium) Yannick Vandenbulcke
June 9	Belgium F2 Futures; Binche, Belgium; Clay $15,000	(Portugal) Romain Barbosa (Portugal) Frederico Ferreira Silva; 6–2, 7–6^{(7–4)}	(Germany) Oscar Otte (Germany) Peter Torebko	(Germany) Florian Fallert (Russia) Philipp Davydenko	(Belgium) Germain Gigounon (Belgium) Arthur De Greef (Belgium) Alexandre Folie (Belgium) Yannick Vandenbulcke
June 9	China F7 Futures; Putian, China; Hard $15,000	(Chinese Taipei) Huang Liang-chi; 7–5, 6–3	(Chinese Taipei) Yang Tsung-hua	(United States) Nicolas Meister (China) Gong Maoxin	(China) Gong Pengxiang (China) Gao Xin (United States) Evan King (China) Bai Yan
June 9	China F7 Futures; Putian, China; Hard $15,000	(Chinese Taipei) Peng Hsien-yin (Chinese Taipei) Yang Tsung-hua; 1–6, 6–1, [15–13]	(Chinese Taipei) Huang Liang-chi (United States) Nicolas Meister	(United States) Nicolas Meister (China) Gong Maoxin	(China) Gong Pengxiang (China) Gao Xin (United States) Evan King (China) Bai Yan
June 9	Italy F18 Futures; Naples, Italy; Clay $15,000	(Italy) Luca Vanni; 6–3, 6–3	(United States) Mitchell Krueger	(Argentina) Pedro Cachin (Brazil) Daniel Dutra da Silva	(Italy) Matteo Marrai (Italy) Alessandro Bega (Italy) Edoardo Eremin (Italy) Luca Pancaldi
June 9	Italy F18 Futures; Naples, Italy; Clay $15,000	(Italy) Francesco Borgo (Italy) Marco Bortolotti; 7–6^{(10–8)}, 4–6, [10–8]	(Italy) Edoardo Eremin (Italy) Pietro Rondoni	(Argentina) Pedro Cachin (Brazil) Daniel Dutra da Silva	(Italy) Matteo Marrai (Italy) Alessandro Bega (Italy) Edoardo Eremin (Italy) Luca Pancaldi
June 9	Netherlands F1 Futures; Amstelveen, Netherlands; Clay $15,000	(Netherlands) Boy Westerhof; 6–7^{(6–8)}, 6–3, 6–4	(Netherlands) Antal van der Duim	(Sweden) Elias Ymer (Brazil) Bruno Sant'Anna	(Chile) Jorge Aguilar (United States) Gregory Ouellette (Brazil) Thiago Monteiro (Brazil) Wilson Leite
June 9	Netherlands F1 Futures; Amstelveen, Netherlands; Clay $15,000	(Netherlands) Antal van der Duim (Netherlands) Boy Westerhof; 6–1, 7–5	(Brazil) Bruno Sant'Anna (Brazil) João Walendowsky	(Sweden) Elias Ymer (Brazil) Bruno Sant'Anna	(Chile) Jorge Aguilar (United States) Gregory Ouellette (Brazil) Thiago Monteiro (Brazil) Wilson Leite
June 9	Poland F2 Futures; Bydgoszcz, Poland; Clay $15,000	(Czech Republic) Dušan Lojda; 6–3, 5–7, 7–6^{(8–6)}	(Czech Republic) Václav Šafránek	(Poland) Kamil Majchrzak (Chile) Cristóbal Saavedra Corvalán	(Chile) Bastián Malla (Poland) Adam Majchrowicz (Chile) Cristian Garín (Latvia) Jānis Podžus
June 9	Poland F2 Futures; Bydgoszcz, Poland; Clay $15,000	(Czech Republic) Robert Rumler (Czech Republic) Václav Šafránek; 1–6, 6–4, [10–6]	(France) Jérôme Inzerillo (France) Arthur Surreaux	(Poland) Kamil Majchrzak (Chile) Cristóbal Saavedra Corvalán	(Chile) Bastián Malla (Poland) Adam Majchrowicz (Chile) Cristian Garín (Latvia) Jānis Podžus
June 9	Bulgaria F1 Futures; Burgas, Bulgaria; Clay $10,000	(Bulgaria) Dimitar Kuzmanov; 6–4, 6–3	(Colombia) Juan Sebastián Gómez	(Austria) Peter Goldsteiner (Bulgaria) Petar Trendafilov	(Greece) Konstantinos Mikos (Romania) Vasile Antonescu (United States) Nikita Kryvonos (Spain) Marcos Giraldi Requena
June 9	Bulgaria F1 Futures; Burgas, Bulgaria; Clay $10,000	(Bulgaria) Tihomir Grozdanov (Bulgaria) Plamen Milushev; 6–2, 6–1	(Italy) Riccardo Bonadio (Italy) Davide Melchiorre	(Austria) Peter Goldsteiner (Bulgaria) Petar Trendafilov	(Greece) Konstantinos Mikos (Romania) Vasile Antonescu (United States) Nikita Kryvonos (Spain) Marcos Giraldi Requena
June 9	Croatia F13 Futures; Bol, Croatia; Clay $10,000	(France) Mathias Bourgue; 6–2, 7–6^{(7–2)}	(Argentina) Tomás Lipovšek Puches	(Croatia) Duje Kekez (Australia) Maverick Banes	(Australia) Gavin van Peperzeel (Australia) Jake Eames (France) Hugo Nys (Croatia) Franko Miočić
June 9	Croatia F13 Futures; Bol, Croatia; Clay $10,000	(Argentina) Gaston Arturo Grimolizzi (Italy) Giorgio Portaluri; 6–3, 6–4	(Germany) Tim Nekic (France) Hugo Nys	(Croatia) Duje Kekez (Australia) Maverick Banes	(Australia) Gavin van Peperzeel (Australia) Jake Eames (France) Hugo Nys (Croatia) Franko Miočić
June 9	Egypt F21 Futures; Sharm El Sheikh, Egypt; Clay $10,000	(Spain) Marc Giner; 6–3, 6–1	(Austria) Dennis Novak	(Argentina) Valentin Florez (Russia) Alexander Zhurbin	(North Macedonia) Tomislav Jotovski (Egypt) Karim-Mohamed Maamoun (Italy) Francesco Picco (Syria) Issam Al Tawil
June 9	Egypt F21 Futures; Sharm El Sheikh, Egypt; Clay $10,000	(Egypt) Karim-Mohamed Maamoun (Syria) Issam Al Tawil; 4–6, 6–1, [10–4]	(Italy) Francesco Picco (Netherlands) Mark Vervoort	(Argentina) Valentin Florez (Russia) Alexander Zhurbin	(North Macedonia) Tomislav Jotovski (Egypt) Karim-Mohamed Maamoun (Italy) Francesco Picco (Syria) Issam Al Tawil
June 9	France F10 Futures; Mont-de-Marsan, France; Clay $10,000	(France) Medy Chettar; 6–4, 6–4	(Brazil) Marcelo Zormann	(France) Florent Diep (Brazil) João Menezes	(Germany) Richard Becker (Luxembourg) Ugo Nastasi (France) Thomas Giraudeau (France) Jules Marie
June 9	France F10 Futures; Mont-de-Marsan, France; Clay $10,000	(Germany) Richard Becker (France) Laurent Rochette; 6–3, 7–5	(Argentina) Martín Cevasco (Argentina) Dante Gennaro	(France) Florent Diep (Brazil) João Menezes	(Germany) Richard Becker (Luxembourg) Ugo Nastasi (France) Thomas Giraudeau (France) Jules Marie
June 9	Hungary F2 Futures; Budapest, Hungary; Clay $10,000	(Russia) Kirill Dmitriev; 3–6, 6–3, 6–1	(Hungary) Gergely Madarász	(Germany) Maximilian Marterer (United States) Cătălin-Ionuț Gârd	(Sweden) Isak Arvidsson (Kazakhstan) Dmitry Popko (Hungary) Viktor Filipenkó (Sweden) Patrik Rosenholm
June 9	Hungary F2 Futures; Budapest, Hungary; Clay $10,000	(Russia) Kirill Dmitriev (Kazakhstan) Dmitry Popko; 6–2, 4–6, [15–13]	(Sweden) Isak Arvidsson (Sweden) Robin Olin	(Germany) Maximilian Marterer (United States) Cătălin-Ionuț Gârd	(Sweden) Isak Arvidsson (Kazakhstan) Dmitry Popko (Hungary) Viktor Filipenkó (Sweden) Patrik Rosenholm
June 9	Israel F8 Futures; Herzliya, Israel; Hard $10,000	(Republic of Ireland) Sam Barry; 6–4, 7–6^{(7–5)}	(United States) Peter Kobelt	(United States) Devin McCarthy (Israel) Bar Tzuf Botzer	(France) Yannick Jankovits (Israel) Ben Patael (United States) Andrew Carter (Belgium) Sander Gillé
June 9	Israel F8 Futures; Herzliya, Israel; Hard $10,000	(United States) Peter Kobelt (United States) Devin McCarthy; 6–1, 6–2	(Russia) Alexander Mozgovoy (Germany) Sebastian Wagner	(United States) Devin McCarthy (Israel) Bar Tzuf Botzer	(France) Yannick Jankovits (Israel) Ben Patael (United States) Andrew Carter (Belgium) Sander Gillé
June 9	Japan F6 Futures; Kashiwa, Japan; Hard $10,000	(Japan) Yuuya Kibi; 6–3, 6–3	(Japan) Takashi Saito	(Japan) Hiromasa Oku (Japan) Takuto Niki	(Japan) Shunrou Takeshima (Chinese Taipei) Ho Chih-jen (Japan) Yusuke Watanuki (Japan) Takao Suzuki
June 9	Japan F6 Futures; Kashiwa, Japan; Hard $10,000	(Japan) Keisuke Watanuki (Japan) Yusuke Watanuki; 7–6^{(7–4)}, 4–6, [10–7]	(Japan) Takuto Niki (Japan) Arata Onozawa	(Japan) Hiromasa Oku (Japan) Takuto Niki	(Japan) Shunrou Takeshima (Chinese Taipei) Ho Chih-jen (Japan) Yusuke Watanuki (Japan) Takao Suzuki
June 9	Serbia F1 Futures; Belgrade, Serbia; Clay $10,000	(Serbia) Danilo Petrović; 6–4, 6–3	(Slovakia) Adrian Partl	(Germany) Yannick Maden (Montenegro) Ljubomir Čelebić	(Bosnia and Herzegovina) Ismar Gorčić (Serbia) Nikola Ćirić (Serbia) Nikola Milojević (Serbia) Petar Čonkić
June 9	Serbia F1 Futures; Belgrade, Serbia; Clay $10,000	(Germany) Dominique Denis Maden (Germany) Yannick Maden; 6–4, 2–6, [10–3]	(Serbia) Nikola Ćirić (Serbia) Miljan Zekić	(Germany) Yannick Maden (Montenegro) Ljubomir Čelebić	(Bosnia and Herzegovina) Ismar Gorčić (Serbia) Nikola Ćirić (Serbia) Nikola Milojević (Serbia) Petar Čonkić
June 9	South Africa F3 Futures; Sun City, South Africa; Hard $10,000	(South Africa) Nikala Scholtz; 4–6, 6–2, 6–4	(South Africa) Fritz Wolmarans	(South Africa) Ruan Roelofse (Sweden) Milos Sekulic	(South Africa) Dean O'Brien (United States) Tyler Hochwalt (Sweden) Jacob Adaktusson (South Africa) Stefan Fortmann
June 9	South Africa F3 Futures; Sun City, South Africa; Hard $10,000	(South Africa) Dean O'Brien (South Africa) Ruan Roelofse; 7–6^{(8–6)}, 6–4	(South Africa) Nikala Scholtz (South Africa) Tucker Vorster	(South Africa) Ruan Roelofse (Sweden) Milos Sekulic	(South Africa) Dean O'Brien (United States) Tyler Hochwalt (Sweden) Jacob Adaktusson (South Africa) Stefan Fortmann
June 9	Spain F13 Futures; Martos, Spain; Hard $10,000	(Denmark) Frederik Nielsen; 6–3, 6–2	(Spain) David Vega Hernández	(Spain) Iván Arenas Gualda (Spain) David Pérez Sanz	(Spain) Ricardo Ojeda Lara (Italy) Erik Crepaldi (Spain) Jaume Pla Malfeito (Australia) Dane Propoggia
June 9	Spain F13 Futures; Martos, Spain; Hard $10,000	(Spain) Iván Arenas Gualda (Spain) David Vega Hernández; 7–6^{(7–3)}, 6–7^{(5–7)}, [10–8]	(Italy) Erik Crepaldi (Spain) Borja Rodríguez Manzano	(Spain) Iván Arenas Gualda (Spain) David Pérez Sanz	(Spain) Ricardo Ojeda Lara (Italy) Erik Crepaldi (Spain) Jaume Pla Malfeito (Australia) Dane Propoggia
June 9	Ukraine F7 Futures; Petrovske, Ukraine; Hard $10,000	(Ukraine) Vladyslav Manafov; 6–4, 6–7^{(6–8)}, 6–4	(Spain) Jaime Pulgar García	(Spain) Javier Pulgar García (Ukraine) Stanislav Poplavsky	(Ukraine) Volodymyr Uzhylovskyi (Ukraine) Dmytro Kamynin (Ukraine) Alexander Lebedyn (Ukraine) Gleb Alekseenko
June 9	Ukraine F7 Futures; Petrovske, Ukraine; Hard $10,000	(Ukraine) Vladyslav Manafov (Ukraine) Volodymyr Uzhylovskyi; 7–5, 6–2	(Ukraine) Marat Deviatiarov (Spain) Jaime Pulgar García	(Spain) Javier Pulgar García (Ukraine) Stanislav Poplavsky	(Ukraine) Volodymyr Uzhylovskyi (Ukraine) Dmytro Kamynin (Ukraine) Alexander Lebedyn (Ukraine) Gleb Alekseenko
June 16	France F11 Futures; Ajaccio, France; Clay $15,000+H	(Germany) Nils Langer; 7–6^{(7–3)}, 6–3	(France) Jordan Ubiergo	(France) Julien Obry (France) Antoine Hoang	(Brazil) João Pedro Sorgi (France) Laurent Rochette (Argentina) Federico Coria (France) Morgan Bourbon
June 16	France F11 Futures; Ajaccio, France; Clay $15,000+H	(France) Enzo Couacaud (France) Laurent Rochette; 6–3, 3–6, [10–6]	(Germany) Florian Fallert (Germany) Nils Langer	(France) Julien Obry (France) Antoine Hoang	(Brazil) João Pedro Sorgi (France) Laurent Rochette (Argentina) Federico Coria (France) Morgan Bourbon
June 16	Netherlands F2 Futures; Alkmaar, Netherlands; Clay $15,000	(Sweden) Elias Ymer; 6–1, 5–7, 6–2	(Chile) Jorge Aguilar	(Brazil) Wilson Leite (Netherlands) Alban Meuffels	(Netherlands) Kevin Griekspoor (Brazil) Eduardo Dischinger (Netherlands) Niels Lootsma (France) Florent Serra
June 16	Netherlands F2 Futures; Alkmaar, Netherlands; Clay $15,000	(Netherlands) Sander Arends (Netherlands) Niels Lootsma; 6–0, 3–6, [10–7]	(Venezuela) Jordi Muñoz Abreu (Netherlands) Mark Vervoort	(Brazil) Wilson Leite (Netherlands) Alban Meuffels	(Netherlands) Kevin Griekspoor (Brazil) Eduardo Dischinger (Netherlands) Niels Lootsma (France) Florent Serra
June 16	USA F15 Futures; Tulsa, United States; Hard $15,000	(United States) Jared Donaldson; 4–6, 6–3, 7–5	(United States) Jarmere Jenkins	(United States) Ernesto Escobedo (United States) Mackenzie McDonald	(United States) Dennis Nevolo (United States) Raymond Sarmiento (India) Sanam Singh (Bulgaria) Dimitar Kutrovsky
June 16	USA F15 Futures; Tulsa, United States; Hard $15,000	(United States) Dennis Novikov (United States) Eric Quigley; 7–6^{(7–5)}, 6–3	(United States) Jared Donaldson (Libya) Fares Ghasya	(United States) Ernesto Escobedo (United States) Mackenzie McDonald	(United States) Dennis Nevolo (United States) Raymond Sarmiento (India) Sanam Singh (Bulgaria) Dimitar Kutrovsky
June 16	Argentina F7 Futures; Villa María, Argentina; Clay $10,000	(Argentina) Nicolás Kicker; 6–4, 6–3	(Argentina) Tomás Lipovšek Puches	(Brazil) Caio Zampieri (Argentina) Gabriel Alejandro Hidalgo	(Argentina) Hernando Casanova (Argentina) Eduardo Agustín Torre (Argentina) Mateo Nicolás Martínez (Brazil) Tiago Lopes
June 16	Argentina F7 Futures; Villa María, Argentina; Clay $10,000	(Argentina) Juan Ignacio Galarza (Argentina) Eduardo Agustín Torre; 6–4, 7–5	(Argentina) Patricio Heras (Argentina) Gabriel Alejandro Hidalgo	(Brazil) Caio Zampieri (Argentina) Gabriel Alejandro Hidalgo	(Argentina) Hernando Casanova (Argentina) Eduardo Agustín Torre (Argentina) Mateo Nicolás Martínez (Brazil) Tiago Lopes
June 16	Belgium F3 Futures; Limelette, Belgium; Clay $10,000	(Germany) Peter Torebko; 1–6, 6–2, 6–4	(France) Alexis Musialek	(Belgium) Yannick Vandenbulcke (Brazil) Rafael Matos	(North Macedonia) Dimitar Grabul (Brazil) Orlando Luz (Portugal) Frederico Ferreira Silva (Portugal) Romain Barbosa
June 16	Belgium F3 Futures; Limelette, Belgium; Clay $10,000	(Portugal) Romain Barbosa (Belgium) Romain Bogaerts; 6–2, 6–4	(Monaco) Romain Arneodo (Germany) Peter Torebko	(Belgium) Yannick Vandenbulcke (Brazil) Rafael Matos	(North Macedonia) Dimitar Grabul (Brazil) Orlando Luz (Portugal) Frederico Ferreira Silva (Portugal) Romain Barbosa
June 16	Bulgaria F2 Futures; Stara Zagora, Bulgaria; Clay $10,000	(United Kingdom) Jack Carpenter; 4–6, 6–4, 6–2	(Bosnia and Herzegovina) Nerman Fatić	(Russia) Karen Khachanov (Czech Republic) Jan Blecha	(North Macedonia) Tomislav Jotovski (Bulgaria) Valentin Dimov (Spain) Marcos Giraldi Requena (Bulgaria) Petar Trendafilov
June 16	Bulgaria F2 Futures; Stara Zagora, Bulgaria; Clay $10,000	(Bosnia and Herzegovina) Nerman Fatić (North Macedonia) Tomislav Jotovski; 7–5, 6–2	(Czech Republic) Jan Blecha (Bulgaria) Alexandar Lazov	(Russia) Karen Khachanov (Czech Republic) Jan Blecha	(North Macedonia) Tomislav Jotovski (Bulgaria) Valentin Dimov (Spain) Marcos Giraldi Requena (Bulgaria) Petar Trendafilov
June 16	Hungary F3 Futures; Siófok, Hungary; Clay $10,000	(Sweden) Patrik Rosenholm; 7–5, 3–6, 7–5	(Sweden) Isak Arvidsson	(Serbia) Laslo Djere (Chile) Cristóbal Saavedra Corvalán	(Hungary) Péter Nagy (Czech Republic) Jakub Filipský (Slovenia) Tomislav Ternar (Chile) Ricardo Urzúa Rivera
June 16	Hungary F3 Futures; Siófok, Hungary; Clay $10,000	(Chile) Cristóbal Saavedra Corvalán (Chile) Ricardo Urzúa Rivera; 6–1, 6–1	(Hungary) Viktor Filipenkó (Austria) Tristan-Samuel Weissborn	(Serbia) Laslo Djere (Chile) Cristóbal Saavedra Corvalán	(Hungary) Péter Nagy (Czech Republic) Jakub Filipský (Slovenia) Tomislav Ternar (Chile) Ricardo Urzúa Rivera
June 16	Israel F9 Futures; Tel Aviv, Israel; Hard $10,000	(United States) Devin McCarthy; 4–6, 7–5, 6–3	(Israel) Tal Goldengoren	(United States) Peter Kobelt (Greece) Alexandros Jakupovic	(Israel) Edan Leshem (Germany) Sebastian Wagner (Russia) Evgeny Karlovskiy (Israel) Dekel Bar
June 16	Israel F9 Futures; Tel Aviv, Israel; Hard $10,000	(United States) Peter Kobelt (United States) Devin McCarthy; 6–2, 6–7^{(3–7)}, [10–4]	(Belgium) Sander Gillé (Greece) Alexandros Jakupovic	(United States) Peter Kobelt (Greece) Alexandros Jakupovic	(Israel) Edan Leshem (Germany) Sebastian Wagner (Russia) Evgeny Karlovskiy (Israel) Dekel Bar
June 16	Italy F19 Futures; Siena, Italy; Clay $10,000	(Argentina) Pedro Cachin; 7–6^{(7–2)}, 7–5	(France) Gleb Sakharov	(Italy) Claudio Fortuna (Italy) Matteo Trevisan	(Italy) Francesco Picco (Italy) Pietro Rondoni (Italy) Luca Pancaldi (Italy) Giulio Torroni
June 16	Italy F19 Futures; Siena, Italy; Clay $10,000	(Argentina) Pedro Cachin (Argentina) Pablo Galdón; 6–3, 7–6^{(7–4)}	(France) Alexandre Massa (France) Gleb Sakharov	(Italy) Claudio Fortuna (Italy) Matteo Trevisan	(Italy) Francesco Picco (Italy) Pietro Rondoni (Italy) Luca Pancaldi (Italy) Giulio Torroni
June 16	Japan F7 Futures; Akishima, Japan; Carpet $10,000	(Japan) Yuuya Kibi; 6–4, 6–3	(Japan) Hiromasa Oku	(New Zealand) Ben McLachlan (Japan) Yohei Ono	(Japan) Sho Katayama (Japan) Gengo Kikuchi (Chinese Taipei) Ho Chih-jen (Chinese Taipei) Wang Chieh-fu
June 16	Japan F7 Futures; Akishima, Japan; Carpet $10,000	(Japan) Sho Katayama (Japan) Arata Onozawa; 6–7^{(4–7)}, 6–3, [10–4]	(New Zealand) Ben McLachlan (Japan) Keisuke Watanuki	(New Zealand) Ben McLachlan (Japan) Yohei Ono	(Japan) Sho Katayama (Japan) Gengo Kikuchi (Chinese Taipei) Ho Chih-jen (Chinese Taipei) Wang Chieh-fu
June 16	Kazakhstan F7 Futures; Astana, Kazakhstan; Hard $10,000	(Russia) Aleksandr Vasilenko; 6–3, 2–0 retired	(Russia) Stanislav Vovk	(Russia) Vladimir Polyakov (Kazakhstan) Roman Khassanov	(Russia) Evgenii Tiurnev (Kyrgyzstan) Daniiar Duldaev (Georgia (country)) Aleksandre Metreveli (Russia) Anton Manegin
June 16	Kazakhstan F7 Futures; Astana, Kazakhstan; Hard $10,000	(Russia) Anton Manegin (Russia) Aleksandr Vasilenko; 6–4, 4–6, [10–5]	(Russia) Evgeny Elistratov (Russia) Vladimir Polyakov	(Russia) Vladimir Polyakov (Kazakhstan) Roman Khassanov	(Russia) Evgenii Tiurnev (Kyrgyzstan) Daniiar Duldaev (Georgia (country)) Aleksandre Metreveli (Russia) Anton Manegin
June 16	Korea F6 Futures; Gimcheon, South Korea; Hard $10,000	(South Korea) Kim Cheong-eui; 6–2, 6–4	(South Korea) Chung Yun-seong	(South Korea) Chung Hong (Chinese Taipei) Hung Jui-chen	(South Korea) Lee Duck-hee (Japan) Yusuke Watanuki (South Korea) Jun Woong-sun (Australia) John Millman
June 16	Korea F6 Futures; Gimcheon, South Korea; Hard $10,000	(South Korea) Cho Soong-jae (South Korea) Dylan Seong-kwan Kim; 6–2, 6–4	(South Korea) Kang Byung-kook (South Korea) Kang Ho-min	(South Korea) Chung Hong (Chinese Taipei) Hung Jui-chen	(South Korea) Lee Duck-hee (Japan) Yusuke Watanuki (South Korea) Jun Woong-sun (Australia) John Millman
June 16	Mexico F6 Futures; Cancún, Mexico; Hard $10,000	(Mexico) Tigre Hank; 7–6^{(7–3)}, 2–0 retired	(Mexico) Daniel Garza	(Peru) Mauricio Echazú (Chile) Matías Sborowitz	(United States) Tommy Paul (Peru) Jorge Brian Panta (United States) Spencer Papa (Colombia) Michael Quintero
June 16	Mexico F6 Futures; Cancún, Mexico; Hard $10,000	(Mexico) Gerardo López Villasenor (Mexico) Rogelio Siller; 7–6^{(7–5)}, 6–2	(Ecuador) Julio César Campozano (Venezuela) Luis David Martínez	(Peru) Mauricio Echazú (Chile) Matías Sborowitz	(United States) Tommy Paul (Peru) Jorge Brian Panta (United States) Spencer Papa (Colombia) Michael Quintero
June 16	Poland F3 Futures; Wrocław, Poland; Hard $10,000	(France) Jérôme Inzerillo; 6–3, 6–4	(Czech Republic) Jan Šátral	(Czech Republic) Roman Jebavý (Slovakia) Michal Pažický	(Poland) Piotr Łomacki (Poland) Maciej Smoła (Chile) Bastián Malla (Estonia) Vladimir Ivanov
June 16	Poland F3 Futures; Wrocław, Poland; Hard $10,000	(France) Jérôme Inzerillo (France) Arthur Surreaux; 4–6, 6–4 [10–3]	(Czech Republic) Marek Jaloviec (Czech Republic) Václav Šafránek	(Czech Republic) Roman Jebavý (Slovakia) Michal Pažický	(Poland) Piotr Łomacki (Poland) Maciej Smoła (Chile) Bastián Malla (Estonia) Vladimir Ivanov
June 16	Romania F4 Futures; Cluj-Napoca, Romania; Hard $10,000	(France) Mathias Bourgue; 6–2, 6–1	(Italy) Marco Bortolotti	(Spain) Oriol Roca Batalla (Romania) Dragoș Cristian Mîrtea	(Romania) Patrick Ciorcilă (France) Maxime Chazal (Romania) Teodor-Dacian Crăciun (Romania) Darius Florin Brăguși
June 16	Romania F4 Futures; Cluj-Napoca, Romania; Hard $10,000	(Czech Republic) Jan Kunčík (Czech Republic) Dominik Süč; 6–4, 6–1	(Romania) Andrei Ștefan Apostol (Romania) Teodor Leahu	(Spain) Oriol Roca Batalla (Romania) Dragoș Cristian Mîrtea	(Romania) Patrick Ciorcilă (France) Maxime Chazal (Romania) Teodor-Dacian Crăciun (Romania) Darius Florin Brăguși
June 16	Serbia F2 Futures; Belgrade, Serbia; Clay $10,000	(Serbia) Miljan Zekić; 7–5, 6–3	(Germany) Yannick Maden	(France) Grégoire Barrère (Serbia) Miki Janković	(Australia) Gavin van Peperzeel (Serbia) Danilo Petrović (Chile) Juan Carlos Sáez (Serbia) Ivan Bjelica
June 16	Serbia F2 Futures; Belgrade, Serbia; Clay $10,000	(Australia) Jake Eames (Australia) Gavin van Peperzeel; 6–2, 6–0	(Montenegro) Ljubomir Čelebić (Serbia) Marko Djokovic	(France) Grégoire Barrère (Serbia) Miki Janković	(Australia) Gavin van Peperzeel (Serbia) Danilo Petrović (Chile) Juan Carlos Sáez (Serbia) Ivan Bjelica
June 16	Spain F14 Futures; Melilla, Spain; Hard $10,000	(Spain) Jorge Hernando Ruano; 6–2, 4–6, 6–3	(Spain) Ricardo Ojeda Lara	(Spain) David Pérez Sanz (Italy) Erik Crepaldi	(Denmark) Frederik Nielsen (France) Eric Fomba (Spain) Ricardo Villacorta Alonso (Spain) David Vega Hernández
June 16	Spain F14 Futures; Melilla, Spain; Hard $10,000	(Spain) David Pérez Sanz (Bolivia) Federico Zeballos; 6–4, 6–7^{5–7}, [10–5]	(Spain) Iván Arenas Gualda (Spain) David Vega Hernández	(Spain) David Pérez Sanz (Italy) Erik Crepaldi	(Denmark) Frederik Nielsen (France) Eric Fomba (Spain) Ricardo Villacorta Alonso (Spain) David Vega Hernández
June 16	Turkey F21 Futures; Istanbul, Turkey; Hard $10,000	(Australia) Dane Propoggia; 3–6, 6–2, 6–1	(Turkey) Barış Ergüden	(Republic of Ireland) Sam Barry (Turkey) Cem İlkel	(Croatia) Franjo Raspudić (Portugal) André Gaspar Murta (France) Rudy Coco (Turkey) Tuna Altuna
June 16	Turkey F21 Futures; Istanbul, Turkey; Hard $10,000	(Turkey) Cem İlkel (Turkey) Efe Yurtacan; 6–4, 7–6^{(7–5)}	(Turkey) Sarp Ağabigün (Turkey) Altuğ Çelikbilek	(Republic of Ireland) Sam Barry (Turkey) Cem İlkel	(Croatia) Franjo Raspudić (Portugal) André Gaspar Murta (France) Rudy Coco (Turkey) Tuna Altuna
June 16	Ukraine F8 Futures; Petrovske, Ukraine; Hard $10,000	(Ukraine) Denys Molchanov; 6–1, 2–0 retired	(Ukraine) Vladyslav Manafov	(France) Sébastien Boltz (Ukraine) Volodymyr Uzhylovskyi	(France) Maxime Tchoutakian (Spain) Jaime Pulgar García (Ukraine) Dmytro Badanov (Ukraine) Gleb Alekseenko
June 16	Ukraine F8 Futures; Petrovske, Ukraine; Hard $10,000	(Ukraine) Vladyslav Manafov (Ukraine) Volodymyr Uzhylovskyi; 7–5, 6–4	(France) Sébastien Boltz (France) Maxime Tchoutakian	(France) Sébastien Boltz (Ukraine) Volodymyr Uzhylovskyi	(France) Maxime Tchoutakian (Spain) Jaime Pulgar García (Ukraine) Dmytro Badanov (Ukraine) Gleb Alekseenko
June 16	USA F16 Futures; Buffalo, United States; Hard $10,000	(United Kingdom) Ashley Hewitt; 3–6, 6–2, 6–3	(Brazil) Henrique Cunha	(United States) Nathan Pasha (United States) Daniel Nguyen	(United States) Connor Smith (United States) Jean-Yves Aubone (United States) Mitchell Frank (United States) Jason Tahir
June 16	USA F16 Futures; Buffalo, United States; Hard $10,000	(United States) Jean-Yves Aubone (United States) Connor Smith; 6–3, 2–6, [10–6]	(United Kingdom) Luke Bambridge (United Kingdom) Liam Broady	(United States) Nathan Pasha (United States) Daniel Nguyen	(United States) Connor Smith (United States) Jean-Yves Aubone (United States) Mitchell Frank (United States) Jason Tahir
June 23	Canada F3 Futures; Richmond, Canada; Hard $15,000	(United States) Dennis Novikov; 1–6, 6–4, 6–4	(Canada) Filip Peliwo	(Australia) Benjamin Mitchell (South Africa) Rik de Voest	(United States) Kyle McMorrow (Canada) Alexander Day (United States) Mico Santiago (Canada) Philip Bester
June 23	Canada F3 Futures; Richmond, Canada; Hard $15,000	(South Africa) Rik de Voest (United States) Matt Seeberger; 5–7, 7–5, [10–5]	(Mexico) Hans Hach (Canada) Brayden Schnur	(Australia) Benjamin Mitchell (South Africa) Rik de Voest	(United States) Kyle McMorrow (Canada) Alexander Day (United States) Mico Santiago (Canada) Philip Bester
June 23	France F12 Futures; Toulon, France; Clay $15,000	(France) Enzo Couacaud; 6–4, 6–2	(France) Constant Lestienne	(France) Tristan Lamasine (France) Gianni Mina	(France) David Guez (Belgium) Julien Cagnina (Argentina) Federico Coria (France) Alexis Musialek
June 23	France F12 Futures; Toulon, France; Clay $15,000	(France) Yanaïs Laurent (France) Constant Lestienne; 3–6, 6–3, [10–4]	(Argentina) Federico Coria (Argentina) Dante Gennaro	(France) Tristan Lamasine (France) Gianni Mina	(France) David Guez (Belgium) Julien Cagnina (Argentina) Federico Coria (France) Alexis Musialek
June 23	Italy F20 Futures; Busto Arsizio, Italy; Clay $15,000	(Italy) Stefano Travaglia; 6–2, 4–6, 6–4	(Italy) Roberto Marcora	(Belgium) Arthur De Greef (Italy) Luca Vanni	(Czech Republic) Marek Michalička (Italy) Giulio Torroni (Austria) Maximilian Neuchrist (Italy) Alberto Brizzi
June 23	Italy F20 Futures; Busto Arsizio, Italy; Clay $15,000	(Brazil) Fabrício Neis (Brazil) Pedro Sakamoto; 4–6, 6–1, [10–8]	(United States) Sekou Bangoura (Brazil) Daniel Dutra da Silva	(Belgium) Arthur De Greef (Italy) Luca Vanni	(Czech Republic) Marek Michalička (Italy) Giulio Torroni (Austria) Maximilian Neuchrist (Italy) Alberto Brizzi
June 23	Japan F8 Futures; Sapporo, Japan; Clay $15,000	(Japan) Yoshihito Nishioka; 6–4, 6–3	(Japan) Yasutaka Uchiyama	(Japan) Arata Onozawa (Japan) Yuuya Kibi	(Japan) Gengo Kikuchi (Japan) Keisuke Watanuki (Japan) Sho Katayama (Japan) Katsuki Nagao
June 23	Japan F8 Futures; Sapporo, Japan; Clay $15,000	(Japan) Takao Suzuki (Japan) Yasutaka Uchiyama; 6–2, 7–6^{(7–4)}	(Japan) Takuto Niki (Japan) Arata Onozawa	(Japan) Arata Onozawa (Japan) Yuuya Kibi	(Japan) Gengo Kikuchi (Japan) Keisuke Watanuki (Japan) Sho Katayama (Japan) Katsuki Nagao
June 23	Netherlands F3 Futures; Breda, Netherlands; Clay $15,000+H	(Australia) Jason Kubler; 6–3, 6–7^{(6–8)}, 6–3	(Belgium) Kimmer Coppejans	(France) Florent Serra (Belgium) Joris De Loore	(Brazil) Thiago Monteiro (Netherlands) Boy Westerhof (France) Tak Khunn Wang (Brazil) Eduardo Dischinger
June 23	Netherlands F3 Futures; Breda, Netherlands; Clay $15,000+H	(Brazil) Wilson Leite (Sweden) Christian Lindell; 6–3, 7–5	(Chile) Jorge Aguilar (Brazil) Thiago Monteiro	(France) Florent Serra (Belgium) Joris De Loore	(Brazil) Thiago Monteiro (Netherlands) Boy Westerhof (France) Tak Khunn Wang (Brazil) Eduardo Dischinger
June 23	Spain F15 Futures; Palma del Río, Spain; Hard $15,000+H	(Colombia) Eduardo Struvay; 6–4, 7–6^{(7–4)}	(Belarus) Egor Gerasimov	(Spain) David Pérez Sanz (Lithuania) Laurynas Grigelis	(Spain) David Vega Hernández (India) Ramkumar Ramanathan (United States) Eduardo Nava (Spain) Oriol Roca Batalla
June 23	Spain F15 Futures; Palma del Río, Spain; Hard $15,000+H	(Spain) Jaume Pla Malfeito (India) Ramkumar Ramanathan; 7–6^{(7–2)}, 4–6, [10–7]	(Spain) Eduard Esteve Lobato (Spain) Oriol Roca Batalla	(Spain) David Pérez Sanz (Lithuania) Laurynas Grigelis	(Spain) David Vega Hernández (India) Ramkumar Ramanathan (United States) Eduardo Nava (Spain) Oriol Roca Batalla
June 23	USA F17 Futures; Oklahoma City, United States; Hard $15,000	(United States) Jared Donaldson; 6–3, 6–2	(Australia) Andrew Harris	(United States) Raymond Sarmiento (Ecuador) Gonzalo Escobar	(United States) Ernesto Escobedo (United States) Collin Altamirano (United States) Dennis Nevolo (Bulgaria) Dimitar Kutrovsky
June 23	USA F17 Futures; Oklahoma City, United States; Hard $15,000	(United States) Mackenzie McDonald (United States) Martin Redlicki; 4–6, 7–6^{(7–3)}, [10–8]	(Venezuela) Jesús Bandrés (Ecuador) Gonzalo Escobar	(United States) Raymond Sarmiento (Ecuador) Gonzalo Escobar	(United States) Ernesto Escobedo (United States) Collin Altamirano (United States) Dennis Nevolo (Bulgaria) Dimitar Kutrovsky
June 23	Argentina F8 Futures; Villa del Dique, Argentina; Clay $10,000	(Argentina) Tomás Lipovšek Puches; 6–4, 2–6, 7–6^{(9–7)}	(Argentina) Patricio Heras	(Argentina) Juan Pablo Paz (Brazil) Caio Zampieri	(Argentina) Hernán Casanova (Argentina) Maximiliano Estévez (Argentina) Nicolás Kicker (Argentina) Gabriel Alejandro Hidalgo
June 23	Argentina F8 Futures; Villa del Dique, Argentina; Clay $10,000	(Argentina) Juan Ignacio Galarza (Argentina) Nicolás Kicker; 7–6^{(9–7)}, 6–3	(Argentina) Patricio Heras (Argentina) Gabriel Alejandro Hidalgo	(Argentina) Juan Pablo Paz (Brazil) Caio Zampieri	(Argentina) Hernán Casanova (Argentina) Maximiliano Estévez (Argentina) Nicolás Kicker (Argentina) Gabriel Alejandro Hidalgo
June 23	Austria F1 Futures; Seefeld in Tirol, Austria; Clay $10,000	(Czech Republic) Daniel Lustig; 6–2, 6–2	(Italy) Riccardo Bellotti	(Austria) Pascal Brunner (Austria) Bastian Trinker	(Austria) Dennis Novak (Austria) Thomas Statzberger (Slovenia) Tom Kočevar-Dešman (Croatia) Antonio Šančić
June 23	Austria F1 Futures; Seefeld in Tirol, Austria; Clay $10,000	(Austria) Pascal Brunner (Austria) Dennis Novak; 6–3, 6–4	(United States) Erik Elliott (Switzerland) Jacob Kahoun	(Austria) Pascal Brunner (Austria) Bastian Trinker	(Austria) Dennis Novak (Austria) Thomas Statzberger (Slovenia) Tom Kočevar-Dešman (Croatia) Antonio Šančić
June 23	Belgium F4 Futures; Havré, Belgium; Clay $10,000	(Belgium) Yannick Vandenbulcke; 6–2, 6–1	(Belgium) Julien Dubail	(Portugal) Frederico Ferreira Silva (Germany) Mats Moraing	(Belgium) Omar Salman (Australia) Blake Mott (North Macedonia) Dimitar Grabul (Germany) Nico Matic
June 23	Belgium F4 Futures; Havré, Belgium; Clay $10,000	(Portugal) Romain Barbosa (Belgium) Romain Bogaerts; 6–4, 6–4	(Australia) Maverick Banes (Australia) Jacob Grills	(Portugal) Frederico Ferreira Silva (Germany) Mats Moraing	(Belgium) Omar Salman (Australia) Blake Mott (North Macedonia) Dimitar Grabul (Germany) Nico Matic
June 23	Bulgaria F3 Futures; Stara Zagora, Bulgaria; Clay $10,000	(France) Mathias Bourgue; 6–4, 6–3	(Bulgaria) Alexandar Lazov	(Germany) Pirmin Hänle (France) Cedrick Commin	(Italy) Omar Giacalone (Bosnia and Herzegovina) Nerman Fatić (Italy) Edoardo Eremin (United Kingdom) Jack Carpenter
June 23	Bulgaria F3 Futures; Stara Zagora, Bulgaria; Clay $10,000	(Germany) Pirmin Hänle (Germany) Andreas Mies; 6–0, 6–3	(Italy) Francesco Garzelli (Russia) Alexander Igoshin	(Germany) Pirmin Hänle (France) Cedrick Commin	(Italy) Omar Giacalone (Bosnia and Herzegovina) Nerman Fatić (Italy) Edoardo Eremin (United Kingdom) Jack Carpenter
June 23	Kazakhstan F8 Futures; Astana, Kazakhstan; Hard $10,000	(Uzbekistan) Temur Ismailov; 6–4, 6–1	(Belarus) Yaraslav Shyla	(Georgia (country)) George Tsivadze (Kyrgyzstan) Daniiar Duldaev	(Russia) Vladimir Polyakov (Belarus) Andrei Vasilevski (Russia) Aleksandr Vasilenko (Uzbekistan) Sanjar Fayziev
June 23	Kazakhstan F8 Futures; Astana, Kazakhstan; Hard $10,000	(Belarus) Yaraslav Shyla (Belarus) Andrei Vasilevski; 6–4, 6–3	(Russia) Mikhail Fufygin (Uzbekistan) Shonigmatjon Shofayziyev	(Georgia (country)) George Tsivadze (Kyrgyzstan) Daniiar Duldaev	(Russia) Vladimir Polyakov (Belarus) Andrei Vasilevski (Russia) Aleksandr Vasilenko (Uzbekistan) Sanjar Fayziev
June 23	Korea F7 Futures; Gimcheon, South Korea; Hard $10,000	(South Korea) Kim Cheong-eui; 6–3, 6–4	(Japan) Yusuke Watanuki	(Japan) Kaichi Uchida (South Korea) Son Ji-hoon	(South Korea) Nam Kyun-woo (South Korea) Chung Hong (South Korea) Kang Byung-kook (South Korea) Noh Sang-woo
June 23	Korea F7 Futures; Gimcheon, South Korea; Hard $10,000	(South Korea) Jun Woong-sun (South Korea) Nam Kyun-woo; 6–4, 4–6, [7–5] retired	(South Korea) Oh Seong-gook (South Korea) Yun Jae-won	(Japan) Kaichi Uchida (South Korea) Son Ji-hoon	(South Korea) Nam Kyun-woo (South Korea) Chung Hong (South Korea) Kang Byung-kook (South Korea) Noh Sang-woo
June 23	Mexico F7 Futures; Cancún, Mexico; Hard $10,000	(Chile) Matías Sborowitz; 6–3, 7–6^{(7–5)}	(Mexico) Tigre Hank	(Guatemala) Christopher Díaz Figueroa (Ecuador) Julio César Campozano	(Venezuela) Luis David Martínez (Peru) Jorge Brian Panta (Mexico) Lucas Gómez (Mexico) Daniel Garza
June 23	Mexico F7 Futures; Cancún, Mexico; Hard $10,000	(Mexico) Gerardo López Villasenor (Mexico) Rogelio Siller; 3–6, 7–5, [10–3]	(United States) Deiton Baughman (United States) Joseph Digiulio	(Guatemala) Christopher Díaz Figueroa (Ecuador) Julio César Campozano	(Venezuela) Luis David Martínez (Peru) Jorge Brian Panta (Mexico) Lucas Gómez (Mexico) Daniel Garza
June 23	Poland F4 Futures; Wrocław, Poland; Clay $10,000	(Czech Republic) Jan Šátral; 6–4, 7–6^{(7–4)}	(Germany) Maximilian Marterer	(Slovakia) Adrian Sikora (Poland) Marcin Gawron	(Poland) Piotr Łomacki (Poland) Grzegorz Panfil (Ecuador) Iván Endara (Czech Republic) Marek Jaloviec
June 23	Poland F4 Futures; Wrocław, Poland; Clay $10,000	(Germany) Kevin Kaczynski (Germany) Maximilian Marterer; 6–4, 6–4	(Poland) Adam Majchrowicz (Poland) Rafał Teurer	(Slovakia) Adrian Sikora (Poland) Marcin Gawron	(Poland) Piotr Łomacki (Poland) Grzegorz Panfil (Ecuador) Iván Endara (Czech Republic) Marek Jaloviec
June 23	Romania F5 Futures; Sibiu, Romania; Clay $10,000	(Romania) Victor Crivoi; 6–4, 1–6, 6–4	(Romania) Vasile Antonescu	(Moldova) Andrei Ciumac (Czech Republic) Dominik Süč	(Romania) Dragoș Constantin Ignat (Romania) Dragoș Dima (Czech Republic) Jan Kunčík (France) Maxime Forcin
June 23	Romania F5 Futures; Sibiu, Romania; Clay $10,000	(Moldova) Andrei Ciumac (Romania) Petru-Alexandru Luncanu; 6–2, 6–3	(Argentina) Gaston Arturo Grimolizzi (Lithuania) Lukas Mugevičius	(Moldova) Andrei Ciumac (Czech Republic) Dominik Süč	(Romania) Dragoș Constantin Ignat (Romania) Dragoș Dima (Czech Republic) Jan Kunčík (France) Maxime Forcin
June 23	Serbia F3 Futures; Šabac, Serbia; Clay $10,000	(Serbia) Peđa Krstin; 5–7, 6–4, 7–6^{(7–5)}	(Chile) Nicolás Jarry	(Serbia) Miljan Zekić (Slovakia) Adrian Partl	(Hungary) Attila Balázs (Chile) Juan Carlos Sáez (Serbia) Danilo Petrović (Serbia) Ivan Bjelica
June 23	Serbia F3 Futures; Šabac, Serbia; Clay $10,000	(Chile) Guillermo Rivera Aránguiz (Chile) Juan Carlos Sáez; 6–2, 6–4	(Serbia) Danilo Petrović (Serbia) Illija Vučić	(Serbia) Miljan Zekić (Slovakia) Adrian Partl	(Hungary) Attila Balázs (Chile) Juan Carlos Sáez (Serbia) Danilo Petrović (Serbia) Ivan Bjelica
June 23	Thailand F7 Futures; Bangkok, Thailand; Hard $10,000	(Australia) Dayne Kelly; 7–6^{(7–4)}, 7–6^{(9–7)}	(Indonesia) Christopher Rungkat	(Thailand) Pruchya Isaro (France) Yannick Jankovits	(Japan) Ko Suzuki (Thailand) Dane Chuntraruk (Thailand) Singekrawee Wattanakul (India) Ronit Singh Bisht
June 23	Thailand F7 Futures; Bangkok, Thailand; Hard $10,000	(Indonesia) Christopher Rungkat (India) Vishnu Vardhan; 6–1, 6–2	(Thailand) Timo Sivapruksa (Thailand) Wishaya Trongcharoenchaikul	(Thailand) Pruchya Isaro (France) Yannick Jankovits	(Japan) Ko Suzuki (Thailand) Dane Chuntraruk (Thailand) Singekrawee Wattanakul (India) Ronit Singh Bisht
June 23	Turkey F22 Futures; Istanbul, Turkey; Hard $10,000	(Bosnia and Herzegovina) Aldin Šetkić; 6–3, 4–6, 6–1	(Turkey) Barış Ergüden	(France) Rémi Boutillier (France) Jules Marie	(Portugal) André Gaspar Murta (Australia) Dane Propoggia (France) Rudy Coco (Republic of Ireland) Sam Barry
June 23	Turkey F22 Futures; Istanbul, Turkey; Hard $10,000	(Greece) Markos Kalovelonis (Peru) Alexander Merino; 3–6, 6–1, [10–8]	(Australia) Damian Farinola (Australia) Darren Polkinghorne	(France) Rémi Boutillier (France) Jules Marie	(Portugal) André Gaspar Murta (Australia) Dane Propoggia (France) Rudy Coco (Republic of Ireland) Sam Barry
June 23	Ukraine F9 Futures; Petrovske, Ukraine; Hard $10,000	(Ukraine) Denys Molchanov; 7–5, 6–2	(France) Sébastien Boltz	(Ukraine) Dmytro Badanov (Spain) Jaime Pulgar García	(Ukraine) Volodymyr Uzhylovskyi (Ukraine) Marat Deviatiarov (France) Maxime Tchoutakian (Ukraine) Stanislav Poplavskyy
June 23	Ukraine F9 Futures; Petrovske, Ukraine; Hard $10,000	(Ukraine) Sergey Bubka (Ukraine) Denys Molchanov; 6–3, 6–2	(Ukraine) Olexiy Kolisnyk (Ukraine) Alexander Lebedyn	(Ukraine) Dmytro Badanov (Spain) Jaime Pulgar García	(Ukraine) Volodymyr Uzhylovskyi (Ukraine) Marat Deviatiarov (France) Maxime Tchoutakian (Ukraine) Stanislav Poplavskyy
June 23	USA F18 Futures; Rochester, United States; Clay $10,000	(United States) Connor Smith; 6–2, 6–3	(United States) Jean-Yves Aubone	(United States) Ryan Shane (Argentina) Facundo Mena	(United Kingdom) Liam Broady (United States) Daniel Nguyen (United Kingdom) Toby Martin (United Kingdom) Ashley Hewitt
June 23	USA F18 Futures; Rochester, United States; Clay $10,000	(United States) Daniel Nguyen (United States) Connor Smith; 6–3, 6–3	(United Kingdom) Luke Bambridge (United Kingdom) Liam Broady	(United States) Ryan Shane (Argentina) Facundo Mena	(United Kingdom) Liam Broady (United States) Daniel Nguyen (United Kingdom) Toby Martin (United Kingdom) Ashley Hewitt
June 30	Canada F4 Futures; Kelowna, Canada; Hard $15,000	(Australia) Benjamin Mitchell; 6–3, 2–6, 6–4	(Canada) Filip Peliwo	(Canada) Philip Bester (United States) Dennis Novikov	(United States) Kyle McMorrow (United States) Mousheg Hovhannisyan (United States) Alexander Sarkissian (United States) Oscar Fabian Matthews
June 30	Canada F4 Futures; Kelowna, Canada; Hard $15,000	(United States) Carl Eguez (United States) Anderson Reed; 7–6^{(7–2)}, 7–6^{(7–4)}	(Canada) Philip Bester (United States) Matt Seeberger	(Canada) Philip Bester (United States) Dennis Novikov	(United States) Kyle McMorrow (United States) Mousheg Hovhannisyan (United States) Alexander Sarkissian (United States) Oscar Fabian Matthews
June 30	France F13 Futures; Montauban, France; Clay $15,000+H	(France) Tristan Lamasine; 7–6^{(7–5)}, 1–6, 7–6^{(8–6)}	(France) Martin Vaïsse	(France) Vincent Millot (France) Constant Lestienne	(France) Alexis Musialek (France) Laurent Rochette (France) Adrien Puget (Belgium) Niels Desein
June 30	France F13 Futures; Montauban, France; Clay $15,000+H	(France) Yanaïs Laurent (France) Constant Lestienne; 6–1, 6–3	(France) Rémy Chala (France) Valentin Masse	(France) Vincent Millot (France) Constant Lestienne	(France) Alexis Musialek (France) Laurent Rochette (France) Adrien Puget (Belgium) Niels Desein
June 30	Great Britain F12 Futures; Manchester, Great Britain; Grass $15,000	(United Kingdom) Joshua Milton; 6–4, 1–6, 7–6^{(7–3)}	(United Kingdom) George Coupland	(United Kingdom) David Rice (United Kingdom) Brydan Klein	(United Kingdom) Keelan Oakley (United Kingdom) Oliver Golding (United Kingdom) Joe Salisbury (United Kingdom) Edward Corrie
June 30	Great Britain F12 Futures; Manchester, Great Britain; Grass $15,000	(United Kingdom) Oliver Golding (United Kingdom) George Morgan; 7–6^{(7–4)}, 4–6, [10–6]	(United Kingdom) Edward Corrie (United Kingdom) Joshua Ward-Hibbert	(United Kingdom) David Rice (United Kingdom) Brydan Klein	(United Kingdom) Keelan Oakley (United Kingdom) Oliver Golding (United Kingdom) Joe Salisbury (United Kingdom) Edward Corrie
June 30	Italy F21 Futures; Mantua, Italy; Clay $15,000+H	(Italy) Luca Vanni; 6–4, 6–4	(Slovakia) Ivo Klec	(Italy) Gianluca Naso (Italy) Simone Vagnozzi	(France) Maxime Teixeira (Spain) Jordi Samper Montaña (Czech Republic) Dušan Lojda (Italy) Salvatore Caruso
June 30	Italy F21 Futures; Mantua, Italy; Clay $15,000+H	(Brazil) Daniel Dutra da Silva (Brazil) Pedro Sakamoto; 5–7, 6–1, [10–7]	(Dominican Republic) Jhonson García (Dominican Republic) José Hernández	(Italy) Gianluca Naso (Italy) Simone Vagnozzi	(France) Maxime Teixeira (Spain) Jordi Samper Montaña (Czech Republic) Dušan Lojda (Italy) Salvatore Caruso
June 30	Netherlands F4 Futures; Middelburg, Netherlands; Clay $15,000	(Brazil) Thiago Monteiro; 6–4, 6–7^{(2–7)}, 7–5	(Netherlands) Boy Westerhof	(Australia) Jason Kubler (Belgium) Yannick Mertens	(Netherlands) Niels Lootsma (Belgium) Yannik Reuter (Barbados) Darian King (France) Florent Serra
June 30	Netherlands F4 Futures; Middelburg, Netherlands; Clay $15,000	(Netherlands) Sander Arends (Netherlands) Niels Lootsma; 6–4, 6–2	(Netherlands) Jelle Sels (Netherlands) Vincent van den Honert	(Australia) Jason Kubler (Belgium) Yannick Mertens	(Netherlands) Niels Lootsma (Belgium) Yannik Reuter (Barbados) Darian King (France) Florent Serra
June 30	Argentina F9 Futures; Villa Allende, Argentina; Clay $10,000	(Argentina) Juan Ignacio Galarza; 6–0, 6–1	(Argentina) Gustavo Vellbach	(Argentina) Juan Manuel Matute (Argentina) Hernán Casanova	(Colombia) Juan Manuel Benítez Chavarriaga (Colombia) Felipe Mantilla (Argentina) Nicolás Alberto Arreche (Argentina) Juan Pablo Ficovich
June 30	Argentina F9 Futures; Villa Allende, Argentina; Clay $10,000	(Argentina) Juan Ignacio Galarza (Japan) Ryūsei Makiguchi; 3–6, 6–3, [11–9]	(Argentina) Tomás Iriarte (Uruguay) Rodrigo Senattore	(Argentina) Juan Manuel Matute (Argentina) Hernán Casanova	(Colombia) Juan Manuel Benítez Chavarriaga (Colombia) Felipe Mantilla (Argentina) Nicolás Alberto Arreche (Argentina) Juan Pablo Ficovich
June 30	Austria F2 Futures; Seefeld in Tirol, Austria; Clay $10,000	(Austria) Bastian Trinker; 6–2, 6–3	(Italy) Riccardo Bellotti	(Australia) Gavin van Peperzeel (Germany) Kevin Krawietz	(Austria) Gibril Diarra (Slovakia) Kamil Čapkovič (Ecuador) Iván Endara (Czech Republic) Daniel Lustig
June 30	Austria F2 Futures; Seefeld in Tirol, Austria; Clay $10,000	(United States) Erik Elliott (Australia) Gavin van Peperzeel; 3–6, 6–2, [10–6]	(Germany) Kevin Krawietz (Germany) Dominik Schulz	(Australia) Gavin van Peperzeel (Germany) Kevin Krawietz	(Austria) Gibril Diarra (Slovakia) Kamil Čapkovič (Ecuador) Iván Endara (Czech Republic) Daniel Lustig
June 30	Belgium F5 Futures; De Haan, Belgium; Clay $10,000	(United Kingdom) Alexander Ward; 7–6^{(7–3)}, 6–1	(Belgium) Yannick Vandenbulcke	(Brazil) Fabiano de Paula (Portugal) Frederico Ferreira Silva	(North Macedonia) Dimitar Grabul (Belgium) Jonas Merckx (Portugal) Romain Barbosa (Australia) Maverick Banes
June 30	Belgium F5 Futures; De Haan, Belgium; Clay $10,000	(France) Maxime Janvier (France) Florian Lakat; 7–5, 6–1	(Belgium) Michael Geerts (Belgium) Jonas Merckx	(Brazil) Fabiano de Paula (Portugal) Frederico Ferreira Silva	(North Macedonia) Dimitar Grabul (Belgium) Jonas Merckx (Portugal) Romain Barbosa (Australia) Maverick Banes
June 30	Bulgaria F4 Futures; Plovdiv, Bulgaria; Clay $10,000	(Chile) Guillermo Rivera Aránguiz; 5–7, 6–3, 6–1	(Bulgaria) Tihomir Grozdanov	(Russia) Ronald Slobodchikov (Russia) Alexander Igoshin	(Bosnia and Herzegovina) Nerman Fatić (Chile) Juan Carlos Sáez (Spain) Albert Alcaraz Ivorra (United States) Cătălin-Ionuț Gârd
June 30	Bulgaria F4 Futures; Plovdiv, Bulgaria; Clay $10,000	(Chile) Guillermo Rivera Aránguiz (Chile) Juan Carlos Sáez; 6–1, 6–0	(Spain) Albert Alcaraz Ivorra (Russia) Georgyi Malyshev	(Russia) Ronald Slobodchikov (Russia) Alexander Igoshin	(Bosnia and Herzegovina) Nerman Fatić (Chile) Juan Carlos Sáez (Spain) Albert Alcaraz Ivorra (United States) Cătălin-Ionuț Gârd
June 30	Germany F6 Futures; Saarlouis, Germany; Clay $10,000	(Chile) Nicolás Jarry; 6–4, 4–6, 6–4	(Germany) Mats Moraing	(Chile) Cristóbal Saavedra Corvalán (Belgium) Julien Cagnina	(Germany) Pirmin Hänle (Switzerland) Sandro Ehrat (Germany) Florian Fallert (Germany) Marvin Netuschil
June 30	Germany F6 Futures; Saarlouis, Germany; Clay $10,000	(Germany) Pirmin Hänle (Bulgaria) Petar Trendafilov; Walkover	(Chile) Cristóbal Saavedra Corvalán (Chile) Ricardo Urzúa Rivera	(Chile) Cristóbal Saavedra Corvalán (Belgium) Julien Cagnina	(Germany) Pirmin Hänle (Switzerland) Sandro Ehrat (Germany) Florian Fallert (Germany) Marvin Netuschil
June 30	Kazakhstan F9 Futures; Astana, Kazakhstan; Hard $10,000	(Belarus) Andrei Vasilevski; 6–4, 6–3	(Kazakhstan) Denis Yevseyev	(Georgia (country)) Aleksandre Metreveli (Uzbekistan) Temur Ismailov	(Russia) Mikhail Fufygin (Kyrgyzstan) Daniiar Duldaev (Russia) Evgenii Tiurnev (Kazakhstan) Timur Khabibulin
June 30	Kazakhstan F9 Futures; Astana, Kazakhstan; Hard $10,000	(Russia) Mikhail Fufygin (Uzbekistan) Shonigmatjon Shofayziyev; 6–3, 5–7, [10–6]	(Belarus) Yaraslav Shyla (Belarus) Andrei Vasilevski	(Georgia (country)) Aleksandre Metreveli (Uzbekistan) Temur Ismailov	(Russia) Mikhail Fufygin (Kyrgyzstan) Daniiar Duldaev (Russia) Evgenii Tiurnev (Kazakhstan) Timur Khabibulin
June 30	Korea F8 Futures; Gimcheon, South Korea; Hard $10,000	(South Korea) Kim Cheong-eui; 6–3, 6–1	(Japan) Yusuke Watanuki	(South Korea) Choi Dong-whee (South Korea) Nam Ji-sung	(South Korea) Kwon Oh-hee (South Korea) Dylan Seong-kwan Kim (South Korea) Chung Hong (South Korea) Jun Woong-sun
June 30	Korea F8 Futures; Gimcheon, South Korea; Hard $10,000	(South Korea) Kim Yu-seob (South Korea) Lim Hyung-chan; 6–4, 6–2	(Japan) Kaichi Uchida (Japan) Yusuke Watanuki	(South Korea) Choi Dong-whee (South Korea) Nam Ji-sung	(South Korea) Kwon Oh-hee (South Korea) Dylan Seong-kwan Kim (South Korea) Chung Hong (South Korea) Jun Woong-sun
June 30	Mexico F8 Futures; Cancún, Mexico; Hard $10,000	(Mexico) Daniel Garza; 6–1, 7–6^{(7–3)}	(United States) Spencer Papa	(Peru) Mauricio Echazú (Mexico) Lucas Gómez	(Mexico) Luis Patiño (United States) Deiton Baughman (Mexico) Tigre Hank (United States) Nathan Ponwith
June 30	Mexico F8 Futures; Cancún, Mexico; Hard $10,000	(Peru) Mauricio Echazú (Peru) Jorge Brian Panta; 6–1, 7–6^{(7–1)}	(Mexico) Lucas Gómez (Peru) Duilio Vallebuona	(Peru) Mauricio Echazú (Mexico) Lucas Gómez	(Mexico) Luis Patiño (United States) Deiton Baughman (Mexico) Tigre Hank (United States) Nathan Ponwith
June 30	Romania F6 Futures; Focșani, Romania; Clay $10,000	(Romania) Petru-Alexandru Luncanu; 6–4, 6–1	(Italy) Omar Giacalone	(Romania) Vasile Antonescu (Italy) Alberto Cammarata	(Moldova) Maxim Dubarenco (Romania) Dragoș Dima (Italy) Ferdinando Bonuccelli (Portugal) Vasco Mensurado
June 30	Romania F6 Futures; Focșani, Romania; Clay $10,000	(Romania) Victor Vlad Cornea (Romania) Petru-Alexandru Luncanu; 7–6^{(8–6)}, 6–1	(Romania) Alexandru-Daniel Carpen (Moldova) Maxim Dubarenco	(Romania) Vasile Antonescu (Italy) Alberto Cammarata	(Moldova) Maxim Dubarenco (Romania) Dragoș Dima (Italy) Ferdinando Bonuccelli (Portugal) Vasco Mensurado
June 30	Spain F16 Futures; Bakio, Spain; Hard $10,000	(Spain) David Pérez Sanz; 6–2, 6–2	(Spain) José Anton Salazar Martín	(Canada) Steven Diez (Spain) Roberto Ortega Olmedo	(Spain) Eduard Esteve Lobato (Mexico) Miguel Ángel Reyes-Varela (Spain) Oriol Roca Batalla (Spain) Jaume Pla Malfeito
June 30	Spain F16 Futures; Bakio, Spain; Hard $10,000	(Portugal) João Domingues (Spain) Adam Sanjurjo Hermida; 6–3, 3–6, [10–8]	(Spain) Jorge Hernando Ruano (Spain) Ricardo Villacorta Alonso	(Canada) Steven Diez (Spain) Roberto Ortega Olmedo	(Spain) Eduard Esteve Lobato (Mexico) Miguel Ángel Reyes-Varela (Spain) Oriol Roca Batalla (Spain) Jaume Pla Malfeito
June 30	Thailand F8 Futures; Bangkok, Thailand; Hard $10,000	(Chinese Taipei) Chen Ti; 6–4, 6–1	(Japan) Kento Takeuchi	(Thailand) Pruchya Isaro (Thailand) Warit Sornbutnark	(Japan) Ko Suzuki (Australia) Ryan Agar (Thailand) Wishaya Trongcharoenchaikul (Thailand) Phassawit Burapharitta
June 30	Thailand F8 Futures; Bangkok, Thailand; Hard $10,000	(Indonesia) Christopher Rungkat (Indonesia) David Agung Susanto; 6–3, 6–3	(Thailand) Dane Chuntraruk (Thailand) Pruchya Isaro	(Thailand) Pruchya Isaro (Thailand) Warit Sornbutnark	(Japan) Ko Suzuki (Australia) Ryan Agar (Thailand) Wishaya Trongcharoenchaikul (Thailand) Phassawit Burapharitta
June 30	Turkey F23 Futures; Istanbul, Turkey; Hard $10,000	(France) Hugo Nys; 6–4, 6–3	(Bosnia and Herzegovina) Aldin Šetkić	(South Korea) Kim Young-seok (France) Mick Lescure	(Zimbabwe) Benjamin Lock (Australia) Dane Propoggia (Sweden) Jacob Adaktusson (Portugal) André Gaspar Murta
June 30	Turkey F23 Futures; Istanbul, Turkey; Hard $10,000	(France) Hugo Nys (Bolivia) Federico Zeballos; 7–6^{(7–3)}, 3–6, [10–3]	(Turkey) Tuna Altuna (Czech Republic) Michal Schmid	(South Korea) Kim Young-seok (France) Mick Lescure	(Zimbabwe) Benjamin Lock (Australia) Dane Propoggia (Sweden) Jacob Adaktusson (Portugal) André Gaspar Murta
June 30	USA F19 Futures; Pittsburgh, United States; Clay $10,000	(United States) Jean-Yves Aubone; 1–6, 7–5, 7–6^{(8–6)}	(United Kingdom) Toby Martin	(United Kingdom) Liam Broady (United States) Hunter Harrington	(United Kingdom) Luke Bambridge (United States) Jeremy Efferding (Chile) Jorge Montero (United States) Gonzales Austin
June 30	USA F19 Futures; Pittsburgh, United States; Clay $10,000	(United Kingdom) Luke Bambridge (United Kingdom) Liam Broady; 7–5, 6–4	(United States) Gonzales Austin (United States) Quinton Vega	(United Kingdom) Liam Broady (United States) Hunter Harrington	(United Kingdom) Luke Bambridge (United States) Jeremy Efferding (Chile) Jorge Montero (United States) Gonzales Austin
