= 2013 Tilia Slovenia Open =

- Date: 1–7 July
- Edition: 1st
- Surface: Hard
- Location: Portorož, Slovenia

Champions

Singles
- (Slovenia) Grega Žemlja

Doubles
- (Croatia) Marin Draganja / (Croatia) Mate Pavić
Tilia Slovenia Open	· 2014 →

The 2013 Tilia Slovenia Open is a professional tennis tournament played on hard courts. It was the 1st edition of the tournament which was part of the 2013 ATP Challenger Tour. It took place in Portorož, Slovenia between 1 and 7 July 2013.

== Singles main-draw entrants ==
=== Seeds ===
Country	Player	Rank^{1}	Seed
SLO	Grega Žemlja	55	1
RUS	Evgeny Donskoy	66	2
SLO	Aljaž Bedene	90	3
SLO	Blaž Kavčič	132	4
ITA	Matteo Viola	139	5
ITA	Flavio Cipolla	152	6
BLR	Uladzimir Ignatik	162	7
FRA	Stéphane Robert	165	8

- ^{1} Rankings are as of June 25, 2013.

=== Other entrants ===
The following players received wildcards into the singles main draw:

- (Slovenia) Tom Kočevar-Dešman
- (Russia) Stepan Khotulev
- (Slovenia) Marko Lazič
- (Slovenia) Mike Urbanija

The following players received entry from the qualifying draw:

- (Italy) Erik Crepaldi
- (Canada) Frank Dancevic
- (Slovenia) Nik Razboršek
- (Croatia) Filip Veger

The following player received entry as a lucky loser:

- (Croatia) Toni Androić
- (Belarus) Egor Gerasimov

== Doubles main-draw entrants ==
=== Seeds ===
Country	Player	Country	Player	Rank^{1}	Seed
CRO	Marin Draganja	CRO	Mate Pavić	209	1
BRA	Marcelo Demoliner	AUT	Maximilian Neuchrist	409	2
SVK	Karol Beck	BLR	Uladzimir Ignatik	430	3
ITA	Flavio Cipolla	ITA	Matteo Viola	438	4

- ^{1} Rankings as of June 25, 2013.

=== Other entrants ===
The following pairs received wildcards into the doubles main draw:

- (Slovenia) Tom Kočevar-Dešman / (Slovenia) Mike Urbanija
- (Slovenia) Gregor Breskvar / (Slovenia) Jaka Kaplja
- (Slovenia) Miha Mlakar / (Slovenia) Tilen Žitnik

The following pair received entry as an alternate:

- (Brazil) André Ghem / (Netherlands) Sander Groen

== Champions ==
=== Singles ===
- (Slovenia) Grega Žemlja def. (Austria) Martin Fischer 6–4, 7–5

=== Doubles ===
- (Croatia) Marin Draganja / (Croatia) Mate Pavić def. (Slovenia) Aljaž Bedene / (Slovenia) Blaž Rola 6–3, 1–6, [10–5]
