= 2014 Tilia Slovenia Open =

- Date: 7–14 July
- Edition: 2nd
- Surface: Hard
- Location: Portorož, Slovenia

Champions

Singles
- (Slovenia) Blaž Kavčič

Doubles
- (Belarus) Sergey Betov / (Belarus) Aliaksandr Bury
← 2013 ·	Tilia Slovenia Open	· 2015 →

The 2014 Tilia Slovenia Open was a professional tennis tournament played on hard courts. It was the second edition of the tournament which was part of the 2014 ATP Challenger Tour. It took place in Portorož, Slovenia between 7 and 14 July 2014.

== Singles main-draw entrants ==
=== Seeds ===
Country	Player	Rank^{1}	Seed
SLO	Blaž Kavčič	98	1
LUX	Gilles Müller	103	2
RUS	Evgeny Donskoy	114	3
ESP	Adrián Menéndez Maceiras	169	4
FRA	David Guez	170	5
ITA	Thomas Fabbiano	172	6
ITA	Flavio Cipolla	199	7
SRB	Ilija Bozoljac	200	8

- ^{1} Rankings are as of June 24, 2014.

=== Other entrants ===
The following players received wildcards into the singles main draw:

- (Slovenia) Aljaz Jakob Kaplja
- (Slovenia) Aljaž Radinski
- (Slovenia) Tomislav Ternar
- (Slovenia) Mike Urbanija

The following players received entry from the qualifying draw:

- (Slovenia) Tom Kočevar-Dešman
- (Italy) Erik Crepaldi
- (Russia) Evgeny Karlovskiy
- (Croatia) Filip Veger

== Doubles main-draw entrants ==
=== Seeds ===
Country	Player	Country	Player	Rank^{1}	Seed
RUS	Victor Baluda	RUS	Konstantin Kravchuk	253	1
BLR	Sergey Betov	BLR	Aliaksandr Bury	254	2
ESP	Adrián Menéndez Maceiras	CRO	Franko Škugor	256	3
AUS	Jordan Kerr	FRA	Fabrice Martin	344	4

- ^{1} Rankings as of June 24, 2014.

=== Other entrants ===
The following pairs received wildcards into the doubles main draw:

- (Slovenia) Tom Kočevar-Dešman / (Slovenia) Mike Urbanija
- (Slovenia) Matjaz Jurman / (Slovenia) Gregor Repina
- (Slovenia) Rok Jarc / (Slovenia) Aljaz Jakob Kaplja

== Champions ==
=== Singles ===
- (Slovenia) Blaž Kavčič def. (Luxembourg) Gilles Müller 7–5, 6–7^{(4–7)}, 6–1

=== Doubles ===
- (Belarus) Sergey Betov / (Belarus) Aliaksandr Bury def. (Serbia) Ilija Bozoljac / (Italy) Flavio Cipolla 6–0, 6–3
