= 2019 ITF Men's World Tennis Tour (January–March) =

The 2019 ITF Men's World Tennis Tour is the 2019 edition of the second-tier tour for men's professional tennis. It is organised by the International Tennis Federation and is a tier below the ATP Tour. The ITF Men's World Tennis Tour includes tournaments with prize money ranging from $15,000 to $25,000.

== Key ==
M25 tournaments
M15 tournaments

== Month ==
=== January ===
Week of	Tournament	Winner	Runners-up	Semifinalists	Quarterfinalists
December 31	Hong Kong; Hard; M25; Singles and doubles draws	(France) Evan Furness; 5–6, ret.	(Germany) Julian Lenz	(Japan) Shintaro Imai (Argentina) Agustín Velotti	(Japan) Jumpei Yamasaki (Chinese Taipei) Lee Kuan-yi (Japan) Yuki Mochizuki (France) Arthur Rinderknech
December 31	Hong Kong; Hard; M25; Singles and doubles draws	(Thailand) Sanchai Ratiwatana (Thailand) Sonchat Ratiwatana; 6–4, 7–6^{(7–4)}	(Chinese Taipei) Hsu Yu-hsiou (Japan) Shintaro Imai	(Japan) Shintaro Imai (Argentina) Agustín Velotti	(Japan) Jumpei Yamasaki (Chinese Taipei) Lee Kuan-yi (Japan) Yuki Mochizuki (France) Arthur Rinderknech
December 31	Los Angeles, United States; Hard; M25; Singles and doubles draws	(United States) Brandon Holt; 6–3, 6–3	(Ecuador) Emilio Gómez	(United States) Jenson Brooksby (United States) Patrick Kypson	(Kazakhstan) Dmitry Popko (United States) Daniel Nguyen (United States) Martin Redlicki (United States) Govind Nanda
December 31	Los Angeles, United States; Hard; M25; Singles and doubles draws	(Moldova) Alexander Cozbinov (United States) Maxime Cressy; 6–4, 6–2	(Ecuador) Emilio Gómez (Mexico) Luis Patiño	(United States) Jenson Brooksby (United States) Patrick Kypson	(Kazakhstan) Dmitry Popko (United States) Daniel Nguyen (United States) Martin Redlicki (United States) Govind Nanda
December 31	Anning, China; Clay; M15; Singles and doubles draws	(Ukraine) Eric Vanshelboim; 6–3, 6–2	(Switzerland) Luca Castelnuovo	(South Korea) Na Jung-woong (Chinese Taipei) Meng Cing-yang	(Chinese Taipei) Chen Ti (China) Mu Tao (China) Cui Jie (China) Wu Hao
December 31	Anning, China; Clay; M15; Singles and doubles draws	(Chinese Taipei) Chen Ti (Chinese Taipei) Ray Ho; 6–4, 7–6^{(10–8)}	(India) Anirudh Chandrasekar (India) Vijay Sundar Prashanth	(South Korea) Na Jung-woong (Chinese Taipei) Meng Cing-yang	(Chinese Taipei) Chen Ti (China) Mu Tao (China) Cui Jie (China) Wu Hao
January 7	Tucson, United States; Hard; M25; Singles and doubles draws	(United States) Govind Nanda; 4–6, 7–6^{(7–2)}, 6–0	(United States) Martin Redlicki	(Greece) Michail Pervolarakis (United Kingdom) Lloyd Glasspool	(Ecuador) Emilio Gómez (United States) Felix Corwin (United States) Jordi Arconada (United States) Peter Kobelt
January 7	Tucson, United States; Hard; M25; Singles and doubles draws	(Tunisia) Aziz Dougaz (France) Manuel Guinard; 6–4, 5–7, [10–3]	(United Kingdom) Lloyd Glasspool (United Kingdom) Evan Hoyt	(Greece) Michail Pervolarakis (United Kingdom) Lloyd Glasspool	(Ecuador) Emilio Gómez (United States) Felix Corwin (United States) Jordi Arconada (United States) Peter Kobelt
January 7	Anning, China; Clay; M15; Singles and doubles draws	(Argentina) Agustín Velotti; 4–6, 6–3, 7–5	(Japan) Naoki Tajima	(Chinese Taipei) Liu Shao-fan (Japan) Kazuki Nishiwaki	(India) Vijay Sundar Prashanth (Japan) Soichiro Moritani (India) Nitin Kumar Sinha (Chinese Taipei) Lee Kuan-yi
January 7	Anning, China; Clay; M15; Singles and doubles draws	(Chinese Taipei) Chen Ti (Chinese Taipei) Ray Ho; 6–4, 3–6, [10–8]	(Chinese Taipei) Lee Kuan-yi (Hong Kong) Wong Hong-kit	(Chinese Taipei) Liu Shao-fan (Japan) Kazuki Nishiwaki	(India) Vijay Sundar Prashanth (Japan) Soichiro Moritani (India) Nitin Kumar Sinha (Chinese Taipei) Lee Kuan-yi
January 7	Bagnoles-de-l'Orne, France; Clay (indoor); M15+H; Singles and doubles draws	(Romania) Nicolae Frunză; 7–6^{(7–3)}, 4–6, 6–0	(France) Maxime Hamou	(France) Antoine Cornut-Chauvinc (France) Clément Tabur	(France) Mick Lescure (United Kingdom) Stuart Parker (Belgium) Clément Geens (France) Yanais Laurent
January 7	Bagnoles-de-l'Orne, France; Clay (indoor); M15+H; Singles and doubles draws	(France) Yanais Laurent (France) Mick Lescure; 3–6, 6–0, [10–7]	(France) Paul Cayre (France) Louis Dussin	(France) Antoine Cornut-Chauvinc (France) Clément Tabur	(France) Mick Lescure (United Kingdom) Stuart Parker (Belgium) Clément Geens (France) Yanais Laurent
January 7	Manacor, Spain; Clay; M15; Singles and doubles draws	(Switzerland) Sandro Ehrat; 6–4, 6–2	(Sweden) Markus Eriksson	(Germany) Jakob Sude (Spain) Álvaro López San Martín	(Spain) Pedro Vives Marcos (Belgium) Jeroen Vanneste (France) Laurent Lokoli (Argentina) Francisco Cerúndolo
January 7	Manacor, Spain; Clay; M15; Singles and doubles draws	(France) Laurent Lokoli (Belgium) Jeroen Vanneste; 6–1, 6–4	(Switzerland) Adrian Bodmer (Germany) Jakob Sude	(Germany) Jakob Sude (Spain) Álvaro López San Martín	(Spain) Pedro Vives Marcos (Belgium) Jeroen Vanneste (France) Laurent Lokoli (Argentina) Francisco Cerúndolo
January 7	Monastir, Tunisia; Hard; M15; Singles and doubles draws	(Monaco) Lucas Catarina; 6–4, 7–5	(Tunisia) Skander Mansouri	(Italy) Adelchi Virgili (Italy) Luca Giacomini	(Belgium) Arnaud Bovy (Sweden) Jonathan Mridha (Russia) Denis Klok (United Kingdom) Jonathan Gray
January 7	Monastir, Tunisia; Hard; M15; Singles and doubles draws	(Italy) Luca Giacomini (Italy) Adelchi Virgili; 5–7, 6–4, [10–6]	(Tunisia) Skander Mansouri (Germany) Christian Seraphim	(Italy) Adelchi Virgili (Italy) Luca Giacomini	(Belgium) Arnaud Bovy (Sweden) Jonathan Mridha (Russia) Denis Klok (United Kingdom) Jonathan Gray
January 14	Anning, China; Clay; M15; Singles and doubles draws	(Argentina) Agustín Velotti; 6–4, 6–3	(Chinese Taipei) Ray Ho	(China) Bai Yan (Japan) Naoki Takeda	(Japan) Naoki Tajima (Chinese Taipei) Lee Kuan-yi (South Korea) Kim Cheong-eui (Kazakhstan) Grigoriy Lomakin
January 14	Anning, China; Clay; M15; Singles and doubles draws	(Japan) Naoki Tajima (Japan) Kento Takeuchi; 4–6, 7–5, [10–7]	(Italy) Francesco Bessire (Argentina) Agustín Velotti	(China) Bai Yan (Japan) Naoki Takeda	(Japan) Naoki Tajima (Chinese Taipei) Lee Kuan-yi (South Korea) Kim Cheong-eui (Kazakhstan) Grigoriy Lomakin
January 14	Bressuire, France; Hard (indoor); M15+H; Singles and doubles draws	(France) Lény Mitjana; 7–6^{(10–8)}, 6–4	(Russia) Artem Dubrivnyy	(France) Matteo Martineau (Netherlands) Niels Lootsma	(United Kingdom) Anton Matusevich (Italy) Lorenzo Frigerio (Belgium) Yannick Mertens (France) Louis Lechevretel
January 14	Bressuire, France; Hard (indoor); M15+H; Singles and doubles draws	(France) Dan Added (France) Albano Olivetti; 7–6^{(7–5)}, 6–3	(Czech Republic) Michal Konečný (Czech Republic) Tomáš Macháč	(France) Matteo Martineau (Netherlands) Niels Lootsma	(United Kingdom) Anton Matusevich (Italy) Lorenzo Frigerio (Belgium) Yannick Mertens (France) Louis Lechevretel
January 14	Manacor, Spain; Clay; M15; Singles and doubles draws	(Argentina) Francisco Cerúndolo; 6–3, 6–3	(Russia) Ivan Gakhov	(Sweden) Markus Eriksson (Belgium) Jeroen Vanneste	(Switzerland) Johan Nikles (Spain) Eduard Esteve Lobato (Spain) Pol Toledo Bagué (Switzerland) Sandro Ehrat
January 14	Manacor, Spain; Clay; M15; Singles and doubles draws	(Switzerland) Adrian Bodmer (Germany) Jakob Sude; 4–6, 6–3, [11–9]	(Switzerland) Sandro Ehrat (Switzerland) Vullnet Tashi	(Sweden) Markus Eriksson (Belgium) Jeroen Vanneste	(Switzerland) Johan Nikles (Spain) Eduard Esteve Lobato (Spain) Pol Toledo Bagué (Switzerland) Sandro Ehrat
January 14	Monastir, Tunisia; Hard; M15; Singles and doubles draws	(Tunisia) Skander Mansouri; 7–5, 6–3	(Italy) Riccardo Balzerani	(Italy) Adelchi Virgili (Belgium) Maxime Pauwels	(China) Zhang Zhizhen (Italy) Emiliano Maggioli (France) Gabriel Petit (Turkey) Altuğ Çelikbilek
January 14	Monastir, Tunisia; Hard; M15; Singles and doubles draws	(Hungary) Gábor Borsos (Hungary) Péter Nagy; 6–1, 3–6, [10–7]	(Italy) Jannik Sinner (China) Zhang Zhizhen	(Italy) Adelchi Virgili (Belgium) Maxime Pauwels	(China) Zhang Zhizhen (Italy) Emiliano Maggioli (France) Gabriel Petit (Turkey) Altuğ Çelikbilek
January 14	Antalya, Turkey; Clay; M15; Singles and doubles draws	(Italy) Davide Galoppini vs (Italy) Riccardo Bellotti; Singles final was cancelled due to poor weather		(Serbia) Dejan Katić (Russia) Alexander Shevchenko	(Romania) Nicolae Frunză (Poland) Maciej Rajski (Italy) Omar Giacalone (Germany) Paul Wörner
January 14	Antalya, Turkey; Clay; M15; Singles and doubles draws	(Croatia) Ivan Sabanov (Croatia) Matej Sabanov; 6–1, 7–5	(Turkey) Sarp Ağabigün (Romania) Nicolae Frunză	(Serbia) Dejan Katić (Russia) Alexander Shevchenko	(Romania) Nicolae Frunză (Poland) Maciej Rajski (Italy) Omar Giacalone (Germany) Paul Wörner
January 14	Naples, United States; Clay; M15; Singles and doubles draws	(United States) Sekou Bangoura; 7–6^{(8–6)}, 6–0	(Brazil) Pedro Sakamoto	(Italy) Pietro Rondoni (Colombia) Nicolás Mejía	(Chile) Alejandro Tabilo (Colombia) Alejandro Gómez (Peru) Nicolás Álvarez (Italy) Alessandro Petrone
January 14	Naples, United States; Clay; M15; Singles and doubles draws	(Republic of Ireland) Julian Bradley (United States) Strong Kirchheimer; 6–4, 6–2	(Chile) Gonzalo Lama (Chile) Alejandro Tabilo	(Italy) Pietro Rondoni (Colombia) Nicolás Mejía	(Chile) Alejandro Tabilo (Colombia) Alejandro Gómez (Peru) Nicolás Álvarez (Italy) Alessandro Petrone
January 21	Nußloch, Germany; Carpet (indoor); M25; Singles and doubles draws	(Netherlands) Botic van de Zandschulp; 6–2, 6–2	(Germany) Peter Heller	(Netherlands) Tim van Rijthoven (Austria) Alexander Erler	(Zimbabwe) Takanyi Garanganga (Germany) Peter Torebko (Germany) Tobias Simon (Germany) Benjamin Hassan
January 21	Nußloch, Germany; Carpet (indoor); M25; Singles and doubles draws	(Poland) Karol Drzewiecki (Poland) Szymon Walków; 7–5, 6–3	(Czech Republic) Marek Gengel (Ukraine) Danylo Kalenichenko	(Netherlands) Tim van Rijthoven (Austria) Alexander Erler	(Zimbabwe) Takanyi Garanganga (Germany) Peter Torebko (Germany) Tobias Simon (Germany) Benjamin Hassan
January 21	Kazan, Russia; Hard (indoor); M25; Singles and doubles draws	(Uzbekistan) Sanjar Fayziev; 6–3, 7–5	(Russia) Teymuraz Gabashvili	(Russia) Evgenii Tiurnev (Russia) Konstantin Kravchuk	(Belarus) Sergey Betov (Russia) Aleksandr Vasilenko (Russia) Richard Muzaev (Russia) Maxim Ratniuk
January 21	Kazan, Russia; Hard (indoor); M25; Singles and doubles draws	(Russia) Mikhail Fufygin (Russia) Denis Matsukevich; 6–4, 6–4	(Uzbekistan) Khumoyun Sultanov (Russia) Aleksandr Vasilenko	(Russia) Evgenii Tiurnev (Russia) Konstantin Kravchuk	(Belarus) Sergey Betov (Russia) Aleksandr Vasilenko (Russia) Richard Muzaev (Russia) Maxim Ratniuk
January 21	Palm Coast, United States; Clay; M25; Singles and doubles draws	(Peru) Nicolás Álvarez; 7–6^{(7–5)}, 1–6, 6–4	(United States) Sekou Bangoura	(Italy) Alessandro Petrone (Israel) Or Ram-Harel	(Italy) Pietro Rondoni (Brazil) João Lucas Reis da Silva (United States) Harrison Adams (United States) Paul Oosterbaan
January 21	Palm Coast, United States; Clay; M25; Singles and doubles draws	(Colombia) Alejandro Gómez (United States) Junior Alexander Ore; 7–6^{(7–2)}, 6–3	(Peru) Nicolás Álvarez (Mexico) Luis Patiño	(Italy) Alessandro Petrone (Israel) Or Ram-Harel	(Italy) Pietro Rondoni (Brazil) João Lucas Reis da Silva (United States) Harrison Adams (United States) Paul Oosterbaan
January 21	Sharm El Sheikh, Egypt; Hard; M15; Singles and doubles draws	(Egypt) Karim-Mohamed Maamoun; 6–7^{(3–7)}, 6–3, 6–4	(Spain) Pablo Vivero González	(Chinese Taipei) Tseng Chun-hsin (Slovakia) Lukáš Klein	(Poland) Kacper Żuk (Italy) Enrico Dalla Valle (Czech Republic) David Poljak (France) Arthur Rinderknech
January 21	Sharm El Sheikh, Egypt; Hard; M15; Singles and doubles draws	(Chinese Taipei) Hsu Yu-hsiou (Japan) Shintaro Imai; 6–2, 6–0	(Czech Republic) David Poljak (Poland) Kacper Żuk	(Chinese Taipei) Tseng Chun-hsin (Slovakia) Lukáš Klein	(Poland) Kacper Żuk (Italy) Enrico Dalla Valle (Czech Republic) David Poljak (France) Arthur Rinderknech
January 21	Veigy-Foncenex, France; Carpet (indoor); M15; Singles and doubles draws	(Belgium) Christopher Heyman; 7–5, 6–7^{(5–7)}, 6–0	(France) Maxime Tchoutakian	(France) Hugo Grenier (Switzerland) Raphael Baltensperger	(Czech Republic) Tomáš Macháč (France) Dan Added (Monaco) Lucas Catarina (France) Albano Olivetti
January 21	Veigy-Foncenex, France; Carpet (indoor); M15; Singles and doubles draws	(France) Dan Added (France) Albano Olivetti; 6–0, 4–6, [10–7]	(France) Yanais Laurent (France) Maxime Tchoutakian	(France) Hugo Grenier (Switzerland) Raphael Baltensperger	(Czech Republic) Tomáš Macháč (France) Dan Added (Monaco) Lucas Catarina (France) Albano Olivetti
January 21	Palma Nova, Spain; Clay; M15; Singles and doubles draws	(Argentina) Francisco Cerúndolo; 2–6, 6–2, 6–3	(Switzerland) Sandro Ehrat	(Spain) Pol Martín Tiffon (Spain) Carlos Alcaraz	(Spain) Carlos López Montagud (Spain) Miguel Semmler (Spain) Pol Toledo Bagué (France) Maxime Mora
January 21	Palma Nova, Spain; Clay; M15; Singles and doubles draws	(Spain) Sergio Martos Gornés (Belgium) Jeroen Vanneste; 6–3, 6–2	(Spain) Jaume Pla Malfeito (Spain) Pol Toledo Bagué	(Spain) Pol Martín Tiffon (Spain) Carlos Alcaraz	(Spain) Carlos López Montagud (Spain) Miguel Semmler (Spain) Pol Toledo Bagué (France) Maxime Mora
January 21	Monastir, Tunisia; Hard; M15; Singles and doubles draws	(Tunisia) Skander Mansouri; 7–5, 6–1	(Brazil) Gilbert Soares Klier Júnior	(Turkey) Altuğ Çelikbilek (Italy) Riccardo Balzerani	(Italy) Andrea Pellegrino (Germany) Christian Seraphim (Russia) Alen Avidzba (China) Zhang Zhizhen
January 21	Monastir, Tunisia; Hard; M15; Singles and doubles draws	(United Kingdom) Julian Cash (Tunisia) Anis Ghorbel; 7–5, 6–4	(Germany) Valentin Günther (Austria) Philipp Schroll	(Turkey) Altuğ Çelikbilek (Italy) Riccardo Balzerani	(Italy) Andrea Pellegrino (Germany) Christian Seraphim (Russia) Alen Avidzba (China) Zhang Zhizhen
January 21	Antalya, Turkey; Clay; M15; Singles and doubles draws	Tournament was cancelled after the completion of the second round due to ongoing poor weather			(Spain) Luis Gomar Monio (France) Samuel Brosset (Kazakhstan) Sagadat Ayap (Croatia) Matej Sabanov (Sweden) Simon Freund (Turkey) Ergi Kırkın (Argentina) Juan Manuel Cerúndolo (Croatia) Ivan Sabanov
January 28	Weston, United States; Clay; M25; Singles and doubles draws	(Kazakhstan) Dmitry Popko; 6–2, 6–3	(Chile) Alejandro Tabilo	(Brazil) João Souza (Brazil) João Lucas Reis da Silva	(Italy) Pietro Rondoni (United States) Patrick Kypson (Sweden) Christian Lindell (Colombia) Nicolás Mejía
January 28	Weston, United States; Clay; M25; Singles and doubles draws	(United States) Sebastian Korda (Colombia) Nicolás Mejía; 6–3, 3–6, [11–9]	(United States) Harrison Adams (United States) Jordi Arconada	(Brazil) João Souza (Brazil) João Lucas Reis da Silva	(Italy) Pietro Rondoni (United States) Patrick Kypson (Sweden) Christian Lindell (Colombia) Nicolás Mejía
January 28	Sharm El Sheikh, Egypt; Hard; M15; Singles and doubles draws	(Egypt) Karim-Mohamed Maamoun; 6–1, 7–6^{(7–2)}	(United States) Peter Kobelt	(France) Arthur Rinderknech (Japan) Shintaro Imai	(Italy) Francesco Forti (France) Laurent Lokoli (Slovakia) Lukáš Klein (Spain) Pablo Vivero González
January 28	Sharm El Sheikh, Egypt; Hard; M15; Singles and doubles draws	(Italy) Enrico Dalla Valle (Italy) Francesco Forti; 7–6^{(7–5)}, 6–7^{(5–7)}, [10–7]	(Zimbabwe) Benjamin Lock (Zimbabwe) Courtney John Lock	(France) Arthur Rinderknech (Japan) Shintaro Imai	(Italy) Francesco Forti (France) Laurent Lokoli (Slovakia) Lukáš Klein (Spain) Pablo Vivero González
January 28	Palma Nova, Spain; Clay; M15; Singles and doubles draws	(Spain) Oriol Roca Batalla; 7–6^{(9–7)}, 4–6, 6–1	(Argentina) Hernán Casanova	(Switzerland) Johan Nikles (Belgium) Omar Salman	(Spain) Jaume Pla Malfeito (Spain) Sergi Pérez Contri (Sweden) Dragoș Nicolae Mădăraș (Spain) Pedro Vives Marcos
January 28	Palma Nova, Spain; Clay; M15; Singles and doubles draws	(Spain) Eduard Esteve Lobato (Spain) Pol Toledo Bagué; 7–5, 5–7, [10–6]	(Argentina) Hernán Casanova (Spain) Jaume Pla Malfeito	(Switzerland) Johan Nikles (Belgium) Omar Salman	(Spain) Jaume Pla Malfeito (Spain) Sergi Pérez Contri (Sweden) Dragoș Nicolae Mădăraș (Spain) Pedro Vives Marcos
January 28	Monastir, Tunisia; Hard; M15; Singles and doubles draws	(France) Corentin Denolly; 7–6^{(12–10)}, 3–6, 7–5	(Tunisia) Skander Mansouri	(United Kingdom) Evan Hoyt (Brazil) Orlando Luz	(Brazil) Gilbert Soares Klier Júnior (France) Clément Tabur (Italy) Jacopo Berrettini (Brazil) Felipe Meligeni Alves
January 28	Monastir, Tunisia; Hard; M15; Singles and doubles draws	(United Kingdom) Evan Hoyt (Tunisia) Skander Mansouri; 7–6^{(7–1)}, 6–4	(Ecuador) Diego Hidalgo (Brazil) Gilbert Soares Klier Júnior	(United Kingdom) Evan Hoyt (Brazil) Orlando Luz	(Brazil) Gilbert Soares Klier Júnior (France) Clément Tabur (Italy) Jacopo Berrettini (Brazil) Felipe Meligeni Alves
January 28	Antalya, Turkey; Clay; M15; Singles and doubles draws	(Turkey) Ergi Kırkın; 4–6, 7–5, 6–2	(Russia) Kirill Kivattsev	(Romania) Bogdan Ionuț Apostol (Slovenia) Nik Razboršek	(Spain) Andrés Fernández Cánovas (Argentina) Juan Manuel Cerúndolo (Croatia) Matej Sabanov (Brazil) Bruno Sant'Anna
January 28	Antalya, Turkey; Clay; M15; Singles and doubles draws	(Croatia) Ivan Sabanov (Croatia) Matej Sabanov; 6–1, 6–1	(Switzerland) Louroi Martinez (Switzerland) Damien Wenger	(Romania) Bogdan Ionuț Apostol (Slovenia) Nik Razboršek	(Spain) Andrés Fernández Cánovas (Argentina) Juan Manuel Cerúndolo (Croatia) Matej Sabanov (Brazil) Bruno Sant'Anna

=== February ===
Week of	Tournament	Winner	Runners-up	Semifinalists	Quarterfinalists
February 4	Oberentfelden, Switzerland; Carpet (indoor); M25; Singles and doubles draws	(France) Evan Furness; 4–6, 7–5, 6–4	(Switzerland) Sandro Ehrat	(United Kingdom) Lloyd Glasspool (Germany) Julian Lenz	(Germany) Elmar Ejupovic (Israel) Edan Leshem (France) Albano Olivetti (Switzerland) Jérôme Kym
February 4	Oberentfelden, Switzerland; Carpet (indoor); M25; Singles and doubles draws	(Czech Republic) Marek Jaloviec (Czech Republic) Michael Vrbenský; 7–5, 6–1	(Israel) Edan Leshem (France) Albano Olivetti	(United Kingdom) Lloyd Glasspool (Germany) Julian Lenz	(Germany) Elmar Ejupovic (Israel) Edan Leshem (France) Albano Olivetti (Switzerland) Jérôme Kym
February 4	Sharm El Sheikh, Egypt; Hard; M15; Singles and doubles draws	(Egypt) Karim-Mohamed Maamoun; 6–3, 6–1	(France) Laurent Lokoli	(Netherlands) Michiel de Krom (Egypt) Youssef Hossam	(Austria) Alexander Erler (Czech Republic) Patrik Rikl (Chinese Taipei) Tseng Chun-hsin (South Korea) Kim Cheong-eui
February 4	Sharm El Sheikh, Egypt; Hard; M15; Singles and doubles draws	(Belgium) Arnaud Bovy (Belgium) Gauthier Onclin; 6–2, 7–5	(Poland) Daniel Kossek (Poland) Maciej Smoła	(Netherlands) Michiel de Krom (Egypt) Youssef Hossam	(Austria) Alexander Erler (Czech Republic) Patrik Rikl (Chinese Taipei) Tseng Chun-hsin (South Korea) Kim Cheong-eui
February 4	Grenoble, France; Hard (indoor); M15; Singles and doubles draws	(France) Lény Mitjana; 6–3, 7–5	(Belgium) Yannick Mertens	(France) Geoffrey Blancaneaux (France) Matteo Martineau	(France) Clément Tabur (Italy) Julian Ocleppo (Belgium) Niels Desein (France) Yanais Laurent
February 4	Grenoble, France; Hard (indoor); M15; Singles and doubles draws	(Belgium) Niels Desein (Belgium) Yannick Mertens; 7–6^{(9–7)}, 6–3	(France) Dan Added (France) Hugo Voljacques	(France) Geoffrey Blancaneaux (France) Matteo Martineau	(France) Clément Tabur (Italy) Julian Ocleppo (Belgium) Niels Desein (France) Yanais Laurent
February 4	Kaarst, Germany; Carpet (indoor); M15; Singles and doubles draws	(Netherlands) Igor Sijsling; 6–1, 6–4	(Netherlands) Botic van de Zandschulp	(Czech Republic) Robin Staněk (Germany) Mats Rosenkranz	(Germany) Lucas Gerch (Germany) Constantin Schmitz (Italy) Samuele Ramazzotti (Germany) Kai Wehnelt
February 4	Kaarst, Germany; Carpet (indoor); M15; Singles and doubles draws	(Netherlands) Igor Sijsling (Netherlands) Botic van de Zandschulp; 6–4, 6–4	(Germany) Mats Rosenkranz (United Kingdom) Mark Whitehouse	(Czech Republic) Robin Staněk (Germany) Mats Rosenkranz	(Germany) Lucas Gerch (Germany) Constantin Schmitz (Italy) Samuele Ramazzotti (Germany) Kai Wehnelt
February 4	Monastir, Tunisia; Hard; M15; Singles and doubles draws	(Brazil) Felipe Meligeni Alves; 6–4, 6–3	(United Kingdom) Evan Hoyt	(Italy) Jacopo Berrettini (Monaco) Lucas Catarina	(Ecuador) Diego Hidalgo (Spain) Álvaro López San Martín (France) Louis Tessa (Belgium) Christopher Heyman
February 4	Monastir, Tunisia; Hard; M15; Singles and doubles draws	(Italy) Erik Crepaldi (United States) Joseph Van Meter; 6–3, 6–3	(Brazil) Orlando Luz (Brazil) Felipe Meligeni Alves	(Italy) Jacopo Berrettini (Monaco) Lucas Catarina	(Ecuador) Diego Hidalgo (Spain) Álvaro López San Martín (France) Louis Tessa (Belgium) Christopher Heyman
February 4	Antalya, Turkey; Clay; M15; Singles and doubles draws	(Romania) Edris Fetisleam; 6–4, 6–3	(Serbia) Dejan Katić	(Italy) Davide Galoppini (Argentina) Tomás Lipovšek Puches	(Colombia) Cristian Rodríguez (Ukraine) Oleg Prihodko (Brazil) Bruno Sant'Anna (Sweden) Dragoș Nicolae Mădăraș
February 4	Antalya, Turkey; Clay; M15; Singles and doubles draws	(Argentina) Hernán Casanova (Argentina) Tomás Lipovšek Puches; 6–4, 7–5	(Romania) Bogdan Borza (Romania) Edris Fetisleam	(Italy) Davide Galoppini (Argentina) Tomás Lipovšek Puches	(Colombia) Cristian Rodríguez (Ukraine) Oleg Prihodko (Brazil) Bruno Sant'Anna (Sweden) Dragoș Nicolae Mădăraș
February 4	Claremont, United States; Hard; M15; Singles and doubles draws	(Northern Mariana Islands) Colin Sinclair; 6–3, 7–6^{(7–3)}	(France) Lucas Poullain	(United States) Henry Craig (United States) Jordi Arconada	(United States) George Goldhoff (United States) Jenson Brooksby (Greece) Michail Pervolarakis (Dominican Republic) José Olivares
February 4	Claremont, United States; Hard; M15; Singles and doubles draws	(United States) George Goldhoff (United States) Austin Rapp; 4–6, 6–3, [10–7]	(Japan) Jumpei Yamasaki (United States) Michael Zhu	(United States) Henry Craig (United States) Jordi Arconada	(United States) George Goldhoff (United States) Jenson Brooksby (Greece) Michail Pervolarakis (Dominican Republic) José Olivares
February 11	Barnstaple, Great Britain; Hard (indoor); M25; Singles and doubles draws	(Netherlands) Tim van Rijthoven; 7–6^{(7–5)}, 3–6, 6–1	(Ukraine) Danylo Kalenichenko	(Germany) Benjamin Hassan (United Kingdom) Ryan Peniston	(France) Antoine Escoffier (France) Sadio Doumbia (United Kingdom) Lloyd Glasspool (United States) Ryan Shane
February 11	Barnstaple, Great Britain; Hard (indoor); M25; Singles and doubles draws	(United Kingdom) Evan Hoyt (United Kingdom) Luke Johnson; 3–6, 7–6^{(7–4)}, [10–6]	(United Kingdom) Julian Cash (United Kingdom) Andrew Watson	(Germany) Benjamin Hassan (United Kingdom) Ryan Peniston	(France) Antoine Escoffier (France) Sadio Doumbia (United Kingdom) Lloyd Glasspool (United States) Ryan Shane
February 11	Aktobe, Kazakhstan; Hard (indoor); M25; Singles and doubles draws	(Netherlands) Niels Lootsma; 6–4, 6–4	(Chile) Alejandro Tabilo	(Russia) Teymuraz Gabashvili (Italy) Jannik Sinner	(Uzbekistan) Sanjar Fayziev (Israel) Ben Patael (Russia) Timur Kiyamov (Uzbekistan) Khumoyun Sultanov
February 11	Aktobe, Kazakhstan; Hard (indoor); M25; Singles and doubles draws	(Russia) Teymuraz Gabashvili (Belarus) Ivan Liutarevich; 6–3, 6–4	(Russia) Savriyan Danilov (Netherlands) Niels Lootsma	(Russia) Teymuraz Gabashvili (Italy) Jannik Sinner	(Uzbekistan) Sanjar Fayziev (Israel) Ben Patael (Russia) Timur Kiyamov (Uzbekistan) Khumoyun Sultanov
February 11	Sharm El Sheikh, Egypt; Hard; M15; Singles and doubles draws	(Chinese Taipei) Wu Tung-lin; 6–3, 6–3	(Czech Republic) Vít Kopřiva	(South Korea) Kim Cheong-eui (Egypt) Youssef Hossam	(Belgium) Arnaud Bovy (Ukraine) Vladyslav Manafov (France) Florian Lakat (Netherlands) Jesper de Jong
February 11	Sharm El Sheikh, Egypt; Hard; M15; Singles and doubles draws	(Belgium) Michael Geerts (Ukraine) Vladyslav Manafov; 6–3, 7–6^{(12–10)}	(Zimbabwe) Benjamin Lock (Zimbabwe) Courtney John Lock	(South Korea) Kim Cheong-eui (Egypt) Youssef Hossam	(Belgium) Arnaud Bovy (Ukraine) Vladyslav Manafov (France) Florian Lakat (Netherlands) Jesper de Jong
February 11	Monastir, Tunisia; Hard; M15; Singles and doubles draws	(Tunisia) Skander Mansouri; 6–4, 4–1, ret.	(Belgium) Christopher Heyman	(Spain) Álvaro López San Martín (Slovakia) Lukáš Klein	(Italy) Adelchi Virgili (Italy) Riccardo Balzerani (Russia) Yan Bondarevskiy (France) Dan Added
February 11	Monastir, Tunisia; Hard; M15; Singles and doubles draws	(Ecuador) Diego Hidalgo (Tunisia) Skander Mansouri; 7–5, 6–0	(France) Dan Added (France) Yanais Laurent	(Spain) Álvaro López San Martín (Slovakia) Lukáš Klein	(Italy) Adelchi Virgili (Italy) Riccardo Balzerani (Russia) Yan Bondarevskiy (France) Dan Added
February 11	Antalya, Turkey; Clay; M15; Singles and doubles draws	(Kazakhstan) Dmitry Popko; 6–4, 3–6, 6–3	(United States) Sebastian Korda	(Argentina) Hernán Casanova (Colombia) Cristian Rodríguez	(Argentina) Juan Manuel Cerúndolo (Czech Republic) Pavel Nejedlý (Italy) Riccardo Bellotti (Bulgaria) Adrian Andreev
February 11	Antalya, Turkey; Clay; M15; Singles and doubles draws	(Italy) Riccardo Bellotti (Kazakhstan) Dmitry Popko; 6–4, 7–6^{(7–3)}	(Argentina) Hernán Casanova (Argentina) Tomás Lipovšek Puches	(Argentina) Hernán Casanova (Colombia) Cristian Rodríguez	(Argentina) Juan Manuel Cerúndolo (Czech Republic) Pavel Nejedlý (Italy) Riccardo Bellotti (Bulgaria) Adrian Andreev
February 11	Tucson, United States; Hard; M15; Singles and doubles draws	(United States) Martin Redlicki; 6–4, 6–4	(Brazil) Karue Sell	(Dominican Republic) José Olivares (United States) Isaiah Strode	(Brazil) João Lucas Reis da Silva (Brazil) João Pedro Sorgi (Canada) Liam Draxl (Chile) Gonzalo Lama
February 11	Tucson, United States; Hard; M15; Singles and doubles draws	(United States) Martin Redlicki (Brazil) Karue Sell; 6–4, 6–1	(Republic of Ireland) Julian Bradley (United States) Strong Kirchheimer	(Dominican Republic) José Olivares (United States) Isaiah Strode	(Brazil) João Lucas Reis da Silva (Brazil) João Pedro Sorgi (Canada) Liam Draxl (Chile) Gonzalo Lama
February 18	Glasgow, Great Britain; Hard (indoor); M25; Singles and doubles draws	(France) Antoine Escoffier; 6–2, 7–6^{(8–6)}	(Germany) Jeremy Jahn	(United Kingdom) Evan Hoyt (United Kingdom) Jack Draper	(United Kingdom) Liam Broady (Netherlands) Igor Sijsling (Germany) Elmar Ejupovic (United Kingdom) Ryan Peniston
February 18	Glasgow, Great Britain; Hard (indoor); M25; Singles and doubles draws	(United Kingdom) Evan Hoyt (United Kingdom) Luke Johnson; 6–1, 7–6^{(8–6)}	(United States) Tom Fawcett (United States) Alexander Ritschard	(United Kingdom) Evan Hoyt (United Kingdom) Jack Draper	(United Kingdom) Liam Broady (Netherlands) Igor Sijsling (Germany) Elmar Ejupovic (United Kingdom) Ryan Peniston
February 18	Aktobe, Kazakhstan; Hard (indoor); M25; Singles and doubles draws	(Chile) Alejandro Tabilo; 6–3, 6–4	(Netherlands) Niels Lootsma	(Monaco) Lucas Catarina (Russia) Artem Dubrivnyy	(Russia) Teymuraz Gabashvili (Italy) Francesco Vilardo (Chinese Taipei) Tseng Chun-hsin (Russia) Konstantin Kravchuk
February 18	Aktobe, Kazakhstan; Hard (indoor); M25; Singles and doubles draws	(Netherlands) Niels Lootsma (Russia) Aleksandr Vasilenko; 6–2, 7–6^{(7–5)}	(Croatia) Ivan Sabanov (Croatia) Matej Sabanov	(Monaco) Lucas Catarina (Russia) Artem Dubrivnyy	(Russia) Teymuraz Gabashvili (Italy) Francesco Vilardo (Chinese Taipei) Tseng Chun-hsin (Russia) Konstantin Kravchuk
February 18	Sharm El Sheikh, Egypt; Hard; M15; Singles and doubles draws	(Sweden) Filip Bergevi; 7–6^{(7–4)}, 7–6^{(7–2)}	(China) Sun Fajing	(Latvia) Mārtiņš Podžus (Belgium) Michael Geerts	(Spain) Pablo Vivero González (Netherlands) Ryan Nijboer (Italy) Giorgio Ricca (Russia) Kristian Lozan
February 18	Sharm El Sheikh, Egypt; Hard; M15; Singles and doubles draws	(Zimbabwe) Benjamin Lock (Zimbabwe) Courtney John Lock; 7–6^{(7–4)}, 6–7^{(5–7)}, [11–9]	(Netherlands) Ryan Nijboer (Spain) Pablo Vivero González	(Latvia) Mārtiņš Podžus (Belgium) Michael Geerts	(Spain) Pablo Vivero González (Netherlands) Ryan Nijboer (Italy) Giorgio Ricca (Russia) Kristian Lozan
February 18	Vale do Lobo, Portugal; Hard; M15; Singles and doubles draws	(New Zealand) Finn Tearney; 6–2, 2–6, 6–4	(Australia) Jacob Grills	(Switzerland) Johan Nikles (United States) Henry Craig	(Italy) Jacopo Berrettini (Argentina) Genaro Alberto Olivieri (Argentina) Juan Bautista Otegui (Morocco) Lamine Ouahab
February 18	Vale do Lobo, Portugal; Hard; M15; Singles and doubles draws	(Australia) Jacob Grills (Colombia) Eduardo Struvay; 6–2, 7–6^{(13–11)}	(Portugal) Gonçalo Falcão (Portugal) João Monteiro	(Switzerland) Johan Nikles (United States) Henry Craig	(Italy) Jacopo Berrettini (Argentina) Genaro Alberto Olivieri (Argentina) Juan Bautista Otegui (Morocco) Lamine Ouahab
February 18	Monastir, Tunisia; Hard; M15; Singles and doubles draws	(France) Arthur Rinderknech; 6–4, 6–4	(Czech Republic) Petr Nouza	(Belgium) Maxime Pauwels (Italy) Emiliano Maggioli	(Serbia) Marko Tepavac (Italy) Francesco Forti (Germany) Louis Wessels (France) Jaimee Floyd Angele
February 18	Monastir, Tunisia; Hard; M15; Singles and doubles draws	(France) Geoffrey Blancaneaux (France) Arthur Rinderknech; 6–1, 6–4	(Czech Republic) Marek Gengel (Czech Republic) Petr Nouza	(Belgium) Maxime Pauwels (Italy) Emiliano Maggioli	(Serbia) Marko Tepavac (Italy) Francesco Forti (Germany) Louis Wessels (France) Jaimee Floyd Angele
February 18	Antalya, Turkey; Clay; M15; Singles and doubles draws	(Slovenia) Nik Razboršek; 7–6^{(7–3)}, 6–3	(Spain) Pol Toledo Bagué	(Bosnia and Herzegovina) Nerman Fatić (Italy) Pietro Rondoni	(Italy) Riccardo Bellotti (Colombia) Nicolás Mejía (Argentina) Hernán Casanova (Spain) Jordi Samper Montaña
February 18	Antalya, Turkey; Clay; M15; Singles and doubles draws	(China) Hua Runhao (Hong Kong) Wong Hong-kit; 3–0, ret.	(Colombia) Felipe Mantilla (Colombia) Cristian Rodríguez	(Bosnia and Herzegovina) Nerman Fatić (Italy) Pietro Rondoni	(Italy) Riccardo Bellotti (Colombia) Nicolás Mejía (Argentina) Hernán Casanova (Spain) Jordi Samper Montaña
February 25	Albury, Australia; Grass; M25; Singles and doubles draws	(United Kingdom) Brydan Klein; 6–1, 6–2	(Australia) Matthew Romios	(Japan) Shuichi Sekiguchi (Australia) Christopher O'Connell	(Australia) Harry Bourchier (Australia) Thomas Fancutt (Australia) Alexander Crnokrak (Japan) Rio Noguchi
February 25	Albury, Australia; Grass; M25; Singles and doubles draws	(United Kingdom) Brydan Klein (Australia) Scott Puodziunas; 4–6, 7–5, [11–9]	(India) Arjun Kadhe (Australia) Jason Taylor	(Japan) Shuichi Sekiguchi (Australia) Christopher O'Connell	(Australia) Harry Bourchier (Australia) Thomas Fancutt (Australia) Alexander Crnokrak (Japan) Rio Noguchi
February 25	Trento, Italy; Hard (indoor); M25; Singles and doubles draws	(Italy) Jannik Sinner; 6–3, 6–4	(Germany) Jeremy Jahn	(Germany) Julian Lenz (Germany) Elmar Ejupovic	(Netherlands) Jelle Sels (Russia) Artem Dubrivnyy (France) Antoine Cornut-Chauvinc (Netherlands) Gijs Brouwer
February 25	Trento, Italy; Hard (indoor); M25; Singles and doubles draws	(Austria) Alexander Erler (Germany) Julian Lenz; 6–3, 6–4	(United States) Felix Corwin (United States) Danny Thomas	(Germany) Julian Lenz (Germany) Elmar Ejupovic	(Netherlands) Jelle Sels (Russia) Artem Dubrivnyy (France) Antoine Cornut-Chauvinc (Netherlands) Gijs Brouwer
February 25	Sharm El Sheikh, Egypt; Hard; M15; Singles and doubles draws	(Norway) Viktor Durasovic; 6–7^{(5–7)}, 6–4, 6–4	(Germany) Daniel Altmaier	(Spain) Pablo Vivero González (Egypt) Youssef Hossam	(Italy) Marco Miceli (Spain) Andrés Artuñedo (Switzerland) Adam Moundir (Poland) Daniel Michalski
February 25	Sharm El Sheikh, Egypt; Hard; M15; Singles and doubles draws	(Spain) Andrés Artuñedo (Spain) Pablo Vivero González; 6–4, 6–4	(Poland) Daniel Michalski (Czech Republic) David Poljak	(Spain) Pablo Vivero González (Egypt) Youssef Hossam	(Italy) Marco Miceli (Spain) Andrés Artuñedo (Switzerland) Adam Moundir (Poland) Daniel Michalski
February 25	Faro, Portugal; Hard; M15; Singles and doubles draws	(Switzerland) Sandro Ehrat; 6–2, 6–2	(Australia) Jacob Grills	(Colombia) Alejandro Gómez (Brazil) Oscar José Gutierrez	(Czech Republic) Jonáš Forejtek (Spain) Álvaro López San Martín (Argentina) Mateo Nicolás Martínez (Belgium) Michael Geerts
February 25	Faro, Portugal; Hard; M15; Singles and doubles draws	(Portugal) Fred Gil (Argentina) Manuel Peña López; 6–2, 6–4	(Spain) Álvaro López San Martín (Morocco) Lamine Ouahab	(Colombia) Alejandro Gómez (Brazil) Oscar José Gutierrez	(Czech Republic) Jonáš Forejtek (Spain) Álvaro López San Martín (Argentina) Mateo Nicolás Martínez (Belgium) Michael Geerts
February 25	Monastir, Tunisia; Hard; M15; Singles and doubles draws	(Turkey) Altuğ Çelikbilek; 2–6, 6–4, 6–1	(Germany) Christoph Negritu	(France) Valentin Royer (Réunion) Quentin Robert	(Italy) Alessandro Bega (Spain) Carlos Sánchez Jover (Argentina) Juan Pablo Paz (France) Maxime Tchoutakian
February 25	Monastir, Tunisia; Hard; M15; Singles and doubles draws	(Benin) Alexis Klégou (Austria) David Pichler; 6–4, 6–3	(Peru) Alexander Merino (Germany) Christoph Negritu	(France) Valentin Royer (Réunion) Quentin Robert	(Italy) Alessandro Bega (Spain) Carlos Sánchez Jover (Argentina) Juan Pablo Paz (France) Maxime Tchoutakian
February 25	Antalya, Turkey; Clay; M15; Singles and doubles draws	(Kazakhstan) Dmitry Popko; 5–7, 7–5, 7–5	(United States) Sebastian Korda	(Italy) Pietro Rondoni (Argentina) Matías Zukas	(Belgium) Jeroen Vanneste (Italy) Alessandro Petrone (Russia) Alexander Shevchenko (Bulgaria) Adrian Andreev
February 25	Antalya, Turkey; Clay; M15; Singles and doubles draws	(Romania) Vasile-Alexandru Ghilea (Romania) Alexandru Jecan; 6–2, 6–2	(United States) Sebastian Korda (Colombia) Nicolás Mejía	(Italy) Pietro Rondoni (Argentina) Matías Zukas	(Belgium) Jeroen Vanneste (Italy) Alessandro Petrone (Russia) Alexander Shevchenko (Bulgaria) Adrian Andreev

=== March ===
Week of	Tournament	Winner	Runners-up	Semifinalists	Quarterfinalists
March 4	Mildura, Australia; Grass; M25; Singles and doubles draws	(Australia) Dayne Kelly; 6–1, 4–6, 6–4	(United Kingdom) Brydan Klein	(India) Arjun Kadhe (Japan) Shuichi Sekiguchi	(Japan) Rio Noguchi (Australia) Harry Bourchier (Japan) Yuta Shimizu (Australia) Christopher O'Connell
March 4	Mildura, Australia; Grass; M25; Singles and doubles draws	(Australia) Calum Puttergill (Australia) Brandon Walkin; 7–6^{(7–4)}, 6–7^{(3–7)}, [18–16]	(United Kingdom) Brydan Klein (Australia) Scott Puodziunas	(India) Arjun Kadhe (Japan) Shuichi Sekiguchi	(Japan) Rio Noguchi (Australia) Harry Bourchier (Japan) Yuta Shimizu (Australia) Christopher O'Connell
March 4	Sharm El Sheikh, Egypt; Hard; M15; Singles and doubles draws	(Egypt) Youssef Hossam; 7–5, 6–3	(Spain) Andrés Artuñedo	(Slovakia) Lukáš Klein (Switzerland) Adam Moundir	(Spain) Pablo Vivero González (Ukraine) Vladyslav Manafov (Italy) Giorgio Ricca (Spain) Albert Roglan
March 4	Sharm El Sheikh, Egypt; Hard; M15; Singles and doubles draws	(Spain) Andrés Artuñedo (Spain) Pablo Vivero González; 7–5, 5–7, [11–9]	(Ukraine) Georgii Kravchenko (Ukraine) Vitaliy Sachko	(Slovakia) Lukáš Klein (Switzerland) Adam Moundir	(Spain) Pablo Vivero González (Ukraine) Vladyslav Manafov (Italy) Giorgio Ricca (Spain) Albert Roglan
March 4	Toulouse, France; Hard (indoor); M15; Singles and doubles draws	(France) Hugo Grenier; 4–6, 6–3, 6–4	(Switzerland) Raphael Baltensperger	(France) Rayane Roumane (France) Ronan Joncour	(France) Paul Cayre (United Kingdom) Stuart Parker (France) Maxime Tchoutakian (France) Arthur Reymond
March 4	Toulouse, France; Hard (indoor); M15; Singles and doubles draws	(France) Antoine Escoffier (France) Maxime Tchoutakian; 6–2, 7–5	(Russia) Teymuraz Gabashvili (Kazakhstan) Denis Yevseyev	(France) Rayane Roumane (France) Ronan Joncour	(France) Paul Cayre (United Kingdom) Stuart Parker (France) Maxime Tchoutakian (France) Arthur Reymond
March 4	Nishitama, Japan; Hard; M15; Singles and doubles draws	(Japan) Shintaro Imai; 6–2, 6–2	(South Korea) Nam Ji-sung	(Japan) Sho Shimabukuro (Japan) Jumpei Yamasaki	(Japan) Tomohiro Masabayashi (Japan) Naoki Tajima (South Korea) Hong Seong-chan (Japan) Hiroyasu Ehara
March 4	Nishitama, Japan; Hard; M15; Singles and doubles draws	(Japan) Shintaro Imai (Japan) Takuto Niki; 1–6, 7–6^{(10–8)}, [10–5]	(Australia) Blake Ellis (Thailand) Wishaya Trongcharoenchaikul	(Japan) Sho Shimabukuro (Japan) Jumpei Yamasaki	(Japan) Tomohiro Masabayashi (Japan) Naoki Tajima (South Korea) Hong Seong-chan (Japan) Hiroyasu Ehara
March 4	Oslo, Norway; Hard (indoor); M15; Singles and doubles draws	(Finland) Emil Ruusuvuori; 6–1, 6–4	(Netherlands) Mick Veldheer	(France) Dan Added (Russia) Savriyan Danilov	(Ukraine) Danylo Kalenichenko (Switzerland) Jakub Paul (Netherlands) Bart Stevens (France) Florian Lakat
March 4	Oslo, Norway; Hard (indoor); M15; Singles and doubles draws	(Switzerland) Jakub Paul (Switzerland) Yannik Steinegger; 6–4, 6–1	(Norway) Jakob Grøner (Norway) Lukas Hellum Lilleengen	(France) Dan Added (Russia) Savriyan Danilov	(Ukraine) Danylo Kalenichenko (Switzerland) Jakub Paul (Netherlands) Bart Stevens (France) Florian Lakat
March 4	Loulé, Portugal; Hard; M15; Singles and doubles draws	(Switzerland) Sandro Ehrat; 6–2, 6–4	(Spain) Álvaro López San Martín	(Portugal) Fred Gil (Morocco) Lamine Ouahab	(Portugal) Luís Faria (United States) Henry Craig (Argentina) Manuel Peña López (Argentina) Tomás Martín Etcheverry
March 4	Loulé, Portugal; Hard; M15; Singles and doubles draws	(United Kingdom) Jonathan Binding (Colombia) Alejandro Gómez; 7–6^{(7–3)}, 6–4	(Portugal) Tiago Cação (Argentina) Manuel Peña López	(Portugal) Fred Gil (Morocco) Lamine Ouahab	(Portugal) Luís Faria (United States) Henry Craig (Argentina) Manuel Peña López (Argentina) Tomás Martín Etcheverry
March 4	Doha, Qatar; Hard; M15; Singles and doubles draws	(France) Geoffrey Blancaneaux; 6–4, 6–1	(Australia) Jacob Grills	(Turkey) Marsel İlhan (Belgium) Zizou Bergs	(Venezuela) Ricardo Rodríguez (Slovakia) Marek Semjan (Germany) Milen Ianakiev (Belgium) Arnaud Bovy
March 4	Doha, Qatar; Hard; M15; Singles and doubles draws	(Belgium) Zizou Bergs (France) Geoffrey Blancaneaux; 6–2, 6–4	(Belgium) Arnaud Bovy (Netherlands) Jesper de Jong	(Turkey) Marsel İlhan (Belgium) Zizou Bergs	(Venezuela) Ricardo Rodríguez (Slovakia) Marek Semjan (Germany) Milen Ianakiev (Belgium) Arnaud Bovy
March 4	Tabarka, Tunisia; Clay; M15; Singles and doubles draws	(Spain) Oriol Roca Batalla; 6–4, 7–5	(Spain) Pol Toledo Bagué	(France) Florent Diep (Brazil) Bruno Sant'Anna	(Germany) Paul Wörner (Argentina) Juan Pablo Paz (Italy) Nicolò Turchetti (Belgium) Benjamin D'Hoe
March 4	Tabarka, Tunisia; Clay; M15; Singles and doubles draws	(Spain) Sergio Martos Gornés (Spain) Oriol Roca Batalla; 6–2, 6–2	(Brazil) Wilson Leite (Brazil) Bruno Sant'Anna	(France) Florent Diep (Brazil) Bruno Sant'Anna	(Germany) Paul Wörner (Argentina) Juan Pablo Paz (Italy) Nicolò Turchetti (Belgium) Benjamin D'Hoe
March 4	Antalya, Turkey; Clay; M15; Singles and doubles draws	(Russia) Ivan Nedelko; 6–4, 5–7, 6–2	(Kazakhstan) Dmitry Popko	(Colombia) Nicolás Mejía (Dominican Republic) Nick Hardt	(Brazil) Jordan Correia (Italy) Riccardo Bonadio (Germany) Marvin Netuschil (Argentina) Matías Zukas
March 4	Antalya, Turkey; Clay; M15; Singles and doubles draws	(Peru) Arklon Huertas del Pino (Peru) Conner Huertas del Pino; 7–6^{(7–3)}, 4–6, [10–6]	(United States) Sebastian Korda (Colombia) Nicolás Mejía	(Colombia) Nicolás Mejía (Dominican Republic) Nick Hardt	(Brazil) Jordan Correia (Italy) Riccardo Bonadio (Germany) Marvin Netuschil (Argentina) Matías Zukas
March 11	Kazan, Russia; Hard (indoor); M25+H; Singles and doubles draws	(Russia) Roman Safiullin; 6–3, 1–6, 6–4	(Uzbekistan) Sanjar Fayziev	(Russia) Savriyan Danilov (Latvia) Mārtiņš Podžus	(France) Sadio Doumbia (Germany) Julian Lenz (Uzbekistan) Khumoyun Sultanov (Israel) Ben Patael
March 11	Kazan, Russia; Hard (indoor); M25+H; Singles and doubles draws	(Russia) Konstantin Kravchuk (Russia) Alexander Pavlioutchenkov; Walkover	(Germany) Jeremy Jahn (Germany) Julian Lenz	(Russia) Savriyan Danilov (Latvia) Mārtiņš Podžus	(France) Sadio Doumbia (Germany) Julian Lenz (Uzbekistan) Khumoyun Sultanov (Israel) Ben Patael
March 11	Bakersfield, United States; Hard; M25; Singles and doubles draws	(United States) Jenson Brooksby; 6–3, 6–1	(Australia) Aleksandar Vukic	(United States) Sekou Bangoura (Brazil) João Menezes	(United States) Strong Kirchheimer (Chinese Taipei) Wu Tung-lin (United States) Isaiah Strode (United Kingdom) Lloyd Glasspool
March 11	Bakersfield, United States; Hard; M25; Singles and doubles draws	(United States) Martin Redlicki (United States) Evan Zhu; 6–1, 3–6, [10–7]	(United States) Ian Dempster (United States) Jacob Dunbar	(United States) Sekou Bangoura (Brazil) João Menezes	(United States) Strong Kirchheimer (Chinese Taipei) Wu Tung-lin (United States) Isaiah Strode (United Kingdom) Lloyd Glasspool
March 11	Poreč, Croatia; Clay; M15; Singles and doubles draws	(Italy) Andrea Pellegrino; 6–3, 5–7, 6–4	(France) Maxime Chazal	(Turkey) Ergi Kırkın (Germany) Constantin Schmitz	(Slovenia) Nik Razboršek (Germany) Benjamin Hassan (Italy) Andrea Basso (Italy) Luca Giacomini
March 11	Poreč, Croatia; Clay; M15; Singles and doubles draws	(Germany) Benjamin Hassan (Germany) Constantin Schmitz; 6–2, 6–0	(Slovenia) Nik Razboršek (Slovenia) Mike Urbanija	(Turkey) Ergi Kırkın (Germany) Constantin Schmitz	(Slovenia) Nik Razboršek (Germany) Benjamin Hassan (Italy) Andrea Basso (Italy) Luca Giacomini
March 11	Sharm El Sheikh, Egypt; Hard; M15; Singles and doubles draws	(Slovakia) Lukáš Klein; 6–4, 6–4	(Italy) Jacopo Berrettini	(Italy) Alessandro Bega (Germany) Daniel Altmaier	(Czech Republic) Dominik Palán (Italy) Enrico Dalla Valle (Czech Republic) Michael Vrbenský (Austria) Jonas Trinker
March 11	Sharm El Sheikh, Egypt; Hard; M15; Singles and doubles draws	(Italy) Enrico Dalla Valle (Italy) Francesco Forti; 4–6, 6–1, [10–7]	(Germany) Daniel Altmaier (Switzerland) Adrian Bodmer	(Italy) Alessandro Bega (Germany) Daniel Altmaier	(Czech Republic) Dominik Palán (Italy) Enrico Dalla Valle (Czech Republic) Michael Vrbenský (Austria) Jonas Trinker
March 11	Poitiers, France; Hard (indoor); M15; Singles and doubles draws	(Réunion) Quentin Robert; 6–4, 6–4	(France) Matteo Martineau	(France) Corentin Denolly (France) Louis Lechevretel	(France) Antoine Escoffier (Ukraine) Danylo Kalenichenko (France) Albano Olivetti (France) Hugo Grenier
March 11	Poitiers, France; Hard (indoor); M15; Singles and doubles draws	(France) Matteo Martineau (France) Clément Tabur; 6–3, 6–4	(France) Tony Bourcet (France) Antoine Escoffier	(France) Corentin Denolly (France) Louis Lechevretel	(France) Antoine Escoffier (Ukraine) Danylo Kalenichenko (France) Albano Olivetti (France) Hugo Grenier
March 11	Nishitōkyō, Japan; Hard; M15; Singles and doubles draws	(South Korea) Hong Seong-chan; 7–6^{(7–4)}, 6–4	(Japan) Shuichi Sekiguchi	(Japan) Takuto Niki (Japan) Hiroyasu Ehara	(Japan) Yuta Shimizu (Japan) Shintaro Imai (Australia) Blake Ellis (South Korea) Nam Ji-sung
March 11	Nishitōkyō, Japan; Hard; M15; Singles and doubles draws	(South Korea) Nam Ji-sung (South Korea) Song Min-kyu; 4–6, 7–6^{(7–4)}, [10–7]	(Japan) Shintaro Imai (Japan) Takuto Niki	(Japan) Takuto Niki (Japan) Hiroyasu Ehara	(Japan) Yuta Shimizu (Japan) Shintaro Imai (Australia) Blake Ellis (South Korea) Nam Ji-sung
March 11	Cancún, Mexico; Hard; M15; Singles and doubles draws	(Peru) Juan Pablo Varillas; 3–6, 6–3, 6–4	(Japan) Naoki Nakagawa	(Brazil) João Lucas Reis da Silva (Mexico) Alex Hernández	(Bolivia) Federico Zeballos (Ecuador) Diego Hidalgo (Mexico) Gerardo López Villaseñor (United States) Harrison Adams
March 11	Cancún, Mexico; Hard; M15; Singles and doubles draws	(Mexico) Gerardo López Villaseñor (Peru) Jorge Panta; 7–6^{(11–9)}, 4–6, [10–8]	(Brazil) João Lucas Reis da Silva (Brazil) Fernando Yamacita	(Brazil) João Lucas Reis da Silva (Mexico) Alex Hernández	(Bolivia) Federico Zeballos (Ecuador) Diego Hidalgo (Mexico) Gerardo López Villaseñor (United States) Harrison Adams
March 11	Portimão, Portugal; Hard; M15; Singles and doubles draws	(United Kingdom) Evan Hoyt; 6–3, 7–6^{(7–4)}	(Portugal) Tiago Cação	(Colombia) Alejandro Gómez (New Zealand) Finn Tearney	(Argentina) Tomás Martín Etcheverry (Colombia) Eduardo Struvay (United States) Henry Craig (United States) Paul Oosterbaan
March 11	Portimão, Portugal; Hard; M15; Singles and doubles draws	(Brazil) Orlando Luz (Brazil) Rafael Matos; 6–3, 6–4	(Portugal) Fred Gil (Colombia) Eduardo Struvay	(Colombia) Alejandro Gómez (New Zealand) Finn Tearney	(Argentina) Tomás Martín Etcheverry (Colombia) Eduardo Struvay (United States) Henry Craig (United States) Paul Oosterbaan
March 11	Doha, Qatar; Hard; M15; Singles and doubles draws	(Belgium) Zizou Bergs; 6–4, 6–1	(Germany) Adrian Obert	(Russia) Alexander Igoshin (France) Geoffrey Blancaneaux	(Netherlands) Sidané Pontjodikromo (Netherlands) Michiel de Krom (Netherlands) Jesper de Jong (India) Sidharth Rawat
March 11	Doha, Qatar; Hard; M15; Singles and doubles draws	(Netherlands) Jesper de Jong (Netherlands) Michiel de Krom; 6–3, 6–3	(Germany) Dominik Böhler (Belgium) Arnaud Bovy	(Russia) Alexander Igoshin (France) Geoffrey Blancaneaux	(Netherlands) Sidané Pontjodikromo (Netherlands) Michiel de Krom (Netherlands) Jesper de Jong (India) Sidharth Rawat
March 11	Tabarka, Tunisia; Clay; M15; Singles and doubles draws	(France) Arthur Rinderknech; 6–4, 6–2	(Spain) Pol Toledo Bagué	(France) Matthieu Perchicot (Italy) Erik Crepaldi	(Germany) Paul Wörner (Czech Republic) Vít Kopřiva (Republic of Ireland) Simon Carr (Spain) Oriol Roca Batalla
March 11	Tabarka, Tunisia; Clay; M15; Singles and doubles draws	(Tunisia) Anis Ghorbel (Bulgaria) Vasko Mladenov; 6–4, 6–1	(Spain) Sergio Martos Gornés (Spain) Oriol Roca Batalla	(France) Matthieu Perchicot (Italy) Erik Crepaldi	(Germany) Paul Wörner (Czech Republic) Vít Kopřiva (Republic of Ireland) Simon Carr (Spain) Oriol Roca Batalla
March 11	Antalya, Turkey; Clay; M15; Singles and doubles draws	(Brazil) Felipe Meligeni Alves; 6–7^{(5–7)}, 7–5, 0–0, ret.	(Russia) Ivan Nedelko	(Argentina) Matías Zukas (United States) Sebastian Korda	(Russia) Kirill Kivattsev (Austria) Lenny Hampel (Italy) Julian Ocleppo (Colombia) Cristian Rodríguez
March 11	Antalya, Turkey; Clay; M15; Singles and doubles draws	(Brazil) Felipe Meligeni Alves (Germany) Peter Torebko; 6–4, 1–6, [10–8]	(Russia) Kirill Kivattsev (Italy) Julian Ocleppo	(Argentina) Matías Zukas (United States) Sebastian Korda	(Russia) Kirill Kivattsev (Austria) Lenny Hampel (Italy) Julian Ocleppo (Colombia) Cristian Rodríguez
March 11	Arcadia, United States; Hard; M15; Singles and doubles draws	(Switzerland) Antoine Bellier; 6–3, 6–3	(United States) Grey Hamilton	(Argentina) Alan Kohen (United States) Emilio Nava	(Chile) Gonzalo Lama (United States) Vasil Kirkov (France) Jaimee Floyd Angele (United States) Connor Farren
March 11	Arcadia, United States; Hard; M15; Singles and doubles draws	(Greece) Michail Pervolarakis (Slovenia) Matic Špec; 6–4, 6–3	(Sweden) Simon Freund (Sweden) Karl Friberg	(Argentina) Alan Kohen (United States) Emilio Nava	(Chile) Gonzalo Lama (United States) Vasil Kirkov (France) Jaimee Floyd Angele (United States) Connor Farren
March 18	Calabasas, United States; Hard; M25; Singles and doubles draws	(United States) Alexander Ritschard; 6–2, 0–6, 7–6^{(7–5)}	(United States) Stefan Kozlov	(United Kingdom) Liam Broady (United States) Drew Baird	(Netherlands) Gijs Brouwer (Turkey) Altuğ Çelikbilek (Brazil) Karue Sell (United Kingdom) Jonathan Gray
March 18	Calabasas, United States; Hard; M25; Singles and doubles draws	(Bolivia) Boris Arias (United States) Sekou Bangoura; 6–2, 6–2	(United Kingdom) Jack Findel-Hawkins (United Kingdom) Ryan Peniston	(United Kingdom) Liam Broady (United States) Drew Baird	(Netherlands) Gijs Brouwer (Turkey) Altuğ Çelikbilek (Brazil) Karue Sell (United Kingdom) Jonathan Gray
March 18	Pinamar, Argentina; Clay; M15; Singles and doubles draws	(Argentina) Hernán Casanova; 6–2, 6–2	(Argentina) Tomás Martín Etcheverry	(Argentina) Mateo Nicolás Martínez (Argentina) Francisco Cerúndolo	(Argentina) Franco Agamenone (Argentina) Santiago Rodríguez Taverna (Argentina) Gonzalo Villanueva (Argentina) Manuel Peña López
March 18	Pinamar, Argentina; Clay; M15; Singles and doubles draws	(Argentina) Hernán Casanova (Argentina) Francisco Cerúndolo; 7–6^{(9–7)}, 3–6, [10–5]	(Peru) Arklon Huertas del Pino (Peru) Conner Huertas del Pino	(Argentina) Mateo Nicolás Martínez (Argentina) Francisco Cerúndolo	(Argentina) Franco Agamenone (Argentina) Santiago Rodríguez Taverna (Argentina) Gonzalo Villanueva (Argentina) Manuel Peña López
March 18	Mornington, Australia; Clay; M15; Singles and doubles draws	(Australia) Harry Bourchier; 6–4, 6–4	(Australia) Christopher O'Connell	(Switzerland) Luca Castelnuovo (Australia) Thomas Fancutt	(India) Karunuday Singh (Australia) Aaron Addison (Japan) Rio Noguchi (Australia) Rinky Hijikata
March 18	Mornington, Australia; Clay; M15; Singles and doubles draws	(Australia) Calum Puttergill (Australia) Brandon Walkin; 6–1, 7–5	(Australia) Thomas Fancutt (Australia) Dane Sweeny	(Switzerland) Luca Castelnuovo (Australia) Thomas Fancutt	(India) Karunuday Singh (Australia) Aaron Addison (Japan) Rio Noguchi (Australia) Rinky Hijikata
March 18	Manama, Bahrain; Hard; M15; Singles and doubles draws	(Czech Republic) Tomáš Macháč; 6–3, 6–3	(Netherlands) Tim van Rijthoven	(Netherlands) Jesper de Jong (Ukraine) Vitaliy Sachko	(Netherlands) Michiel de Krom (Philippines) Jeson Patrombon (United Kingdom) Isaac Stoute (Netherlands) Sidané Pontjodikromo
March 18	Manama, Bahrain; Hard; M15; Singles and doubles draws	(Russia) Alexander Igoshin (India) Vijay Sundar Prashanth; 6–7^{(5–7)}, 7–6^{(7–5)}, [10–8]	(Netherlands) Jesper de Jong (Netherlands) Sidané Pontjodikromo	(Netherlands) Jesper de Jong (Ukraine) Vitaliy Sachko	(Netherlands) Michiel de Krom (Philippines) Jeson Patrombon (United Kingdom) Isaac Stoute (Netherlands) Sidané Pontjodikromo
March 18	Rovinj, Croatia; Clay; M15; Singles and doubles draws	(Germany) Constantin Schmitz; 6–2, 6–4	(Belgium) Jeroen Vanneste	(Italy) Andrea Basso (Italy) Luca Giacomini	(Turkey) Ergi Kırkın (France) Maxime Chazal (Czech Republic) Tomáš Jiroušek (Hungary) Péter Nagy
March 18	Rovinj, Croatia; Clay; M15; Singles and doubles draws	(Sweden) Markus Eriksson (Belgium) Jeroen Vanneste; 7–5, 6–2	(Croatia) Ivan Sabanov (Croatia) Matej Sabanov	(Italy) Andrea Basso (Italy) Luca Giacomini	(Turkey) Ergi Kırkın (France) Maxime Chazal (Czech Republic) Tomáš Jiroušek (Hungary) Péter Nagy
March 18	Sharm El Sheikh, Egypt; Hard; M15; Singles and doubles draws	(Poland) Kacper Żuk; 7–6^{(7–2)}, 6–3	(Spain) Pablo Vivero González	(Italy) Enrico Dalla Valle (Germany) Robert Strombachs	(Switzerland) Riccardo Maiga (Serbia) Marko Miladinović (Netherlands) Botic van de Zandschulp (Italy) Emiliano Maggioli
March 18	Sharm El Sheikh, Egypt; Hard; M15; Singles and doubles draws	(Netherlands) Igor Sijsling (Netherlands) Botic van de Zandschulp; 7–6^{(10–8)}, 2–6, [10–6]	(India) S D Prajwel Dev (India) Adil Kalyanpur	(Italy) Enrico Dalla Valle (Germany) Robert Strombachs	(Switzerland) Riccardo Maiga (Serbia) Marko Miladinović (Netherlands) Botic van de Zandschulp (Italy) Emiliano Maggioli
March 18	Kōfu, Japan; Hard; M15; Singles and doubles draws	(Japan) Jumpei Yamasaki; 7–6^{(7–5)}, 6–3	(Japan) Sho Shimabukuro	(Japan) Ryota Tanuma (Japan) Takuto Niki	(Japan) Yusuke Takahashi (Japan) Issei Okamura (Japan) Hiroyasu Ehara (Netherlands) Mick Veldheer
March 18	Kōfu, Japan; Hard; M15; Singles and doubles draws	(Japan) Hiroyasu Ehara (Japan) Sho Katayama; 6–2, 6–4	(Australia) Blake Ellis (Australia) Michael Look	(Japan) Ryota Tanuma (Japan) Takuto Niki	(Japan) Yusuke Takahashi (Japan) Issei Okamura (Japan) Hiroyasu Ehara (Netherlands) Mick Veldheer
March 18	Cancún, Mexico; Hard; M15; Singles and doubles draws	(Argentina) Facundo Mena; 6–2, 6–4	(Ecuador) Diego Hidalgo	(Mexico) Gerardo López Villaseñor (Finland) Emil Ruusuvuori	(Peru) Juan Pablo Varillas (Bolivia) Federico Zeballos (Peru) Jorge Panta (United States) Jordi Arconada
March 18	Cancún, Mexico; Hard; M15; Singles and doubles draws	(United States) Harrison Adams (United States) Junior Alexander Ore; 6–4, 6–4	(Brazil) João Lucas Reis da Silva (Brazil) Fernando Yamacita	(Mexico) Gerardo López Villaseñor (Finland) Emil Ruusuvuori	(Peru) Juan Pablo Varillas (Bolivia) Federico Zeballos (Peru) Jorge Panta (United States) Jordi Arconada
March 18	Quinta do Lago, Portugal; Hard; M15; Singles and doubles draws	(United Kingdom) Evan Hoyt; 6–4, 6–3	(France) Manuel Guinard	(Brazil) Oscar José Gutierrez (Argentina) Juan Pablo Ficovich	(New Zealand) Finn Tearney (France) Sadio Doumbia (Chile) Michel Vernier (Russia) Teymuraz Gabashvili
March 18	Quinta do Lago, Portugal; Hard; M15; Singles and doubles draws	(Brazil) Orlando Luz (Brazil) Rafael Matos; 7–6^{(7–2)}, 6–3	(Colombia) Alejandro Gómez (United States) Michael Zhu	(Brazil) Oscar José Gutierrez (Argentina) Juan Pablo Ficovich	(New Zealand) Finn Tearney (France) Sadio Doumbia (Chile) Michel Vernier (Russia) Teymuraz Gabashvili
March 18	Murcia, Spain; Clay; M15; Singles and doubles draws	(Spain) Álvaro López San Martín; 7–5, 6–1	(Spain) Javier Barranco Cosano	(Spain) Eduard Esteve Lobato (Spain) Carlos López Montagud	(Spain) Sergi Pérez Contri (Spain) Jaume Pla Malfeito (Italy) Marco Bortolotti (Spain) Carlos Boluda Purkiss
March 18	Murcia, Spain; Clay; M15; Singles and doubles draws	(Spain) Eduard Esteve Lobato (Spain) Álvaro López San Martín; 6–4, 6–4	(Italy) Lorenzo Bocchi (Italy) Francesco Passaro	(Spain) Eduard Esteve Lobato (Spain) Carlos López Montagud	(Spain) Sergi Pérez Contri (Spain) Jaume Pla Malfeito (Italy) Marco Bortolotti (Spain) Carlos Boluda Purkiss
March 18	Tabarka, Tunisia; Clay; M15; Singles and doubles draws	(Czech Republic) Vít Kopřiva; 5–7, 6–1, 1–0, ret.	(Spain) Pol Toledo Bagué	(Russia) Alexander Zhurbin (Brazil) João Pedro Sorgi	(France) Louis Tessa (Spain) Nikolás Sánchez Izquierdo (Argentina) Mariano Kestelboim (France) Matthieu Perchicot
March 18	Tabarka, Tunisia; Clay; M15; Singles and doubles draws	(Argentina) Mariano Kestelboim (Brazil) João Pedro Sorgi; Walkover	(Spain) Imanol López Morillo (Spain) Pol Toledo Bagué	(Russia) Alexander Zhurbin (Brazil) João Pedro Sorgi	(France) Louis Tessa (Spain) Nikolás Sánchez Izquierdo (Argentina) Mariano Kestelboim (France) Matthieu Perchicot
March 18	Antalya, Turkey; Clay; M15; Singles and doubles draws	(Kazakhstan) Dmitry Popko; 5–7, 6–4, 6–1	(Italy) Pietro Rondoni	(Germany) Peter Torebko (Romania) Alexandru Jecan	(Bulgaria) Dimitar Kuzmanov (France) Jules Okala (Italy) Alessandro Petrone (Russia) Ronald Slobodchikov
March 18	Antalya, Turkey; Clay; M15; Singles and doubles draws	(Brazil) Felipe Meligeni Alves (Colombia) Cristian Rodríguez; 6–3, 6–4	(Kazakhstan) Grigoriy Lomakin (Ukraine) Vladyslav Orlov	(Germany) Peter Torebko (Romania) Alexandru Jecan	(Bulgaria) Dimitar Kuzmanov (France) Jules Okala (Italy) Alessandro Petrone (Russia) Ronald Slobodchikov
March 25	Pula, Italy; Clay; M25; Singles and doubles draws	(Italy) Jannik Sinner; 6–1, 6–1	(Italy) Andrea Pellegrino	(Italy) Fabrizio Ornago (Italy) Alessandro Petrone	(Russia) Ronald Slobodchikov (Serbia) Miljan Zekić (Belgium) Christopher Heyman (Italy) Giovanni Fonio
March 25	Pula, Italy; Clay; M25; Singles and doubles draws	(Italy) Marco Bortolotti (Italy) Nicolò Turchetti; 6–2, 4–6, [10–7]	(Austria) Gibril Diarra (France) Laurent Lokoli	(Italy) Fabrizio Ornago (Italy) Alessandro Petrone	(Russia) Ronald Slobodchikov (Serbia) Miljan Zekić (Belgium) Christopher Heyman (Italy) Giovanni Fonio
March 25	Pinamar, Argentina; Clay; M15; Singles and doubles draws	(Argentina) Hernán Casanova; 6–7^{(2–7)}, 6–4, 6–1	(Argentina) Juan Ignacio Galarza	(Argentina) Gonzalo Villanueva (Argentina) Tomás Martín Etcheverry	(Argentina) Guido Iván Justo (Argentina) Juan Manuel Cerúndolo (Argentina) Manuel Peña López (Argentina) Camilo Ugo Carabelli
March 25	Pinamar, Argentina; Clay; M15; Singles and doubles draws	(Argentina) Franco Agamenone (Argentina) Hernán Casanova; 7–5, 6–3	(Argentina) Nicolás Alberto Arreche (Argentina) Manuel Peña López	(Argentina) Gonzalo Villanueva (Argentina) Tomás Martín Etcheverry	(Argentina) Guido Iván Justo (Argentina) Juan Manuel Cerúndolo (Argentina) Manuel Peña López (Argentina) Camilo Ugo Carabelli
March 25	Mornington, Australia; Clay; M15; Singles and doubles draws	(Australia) Harry Bourchier; 6–4, 4–6, 6–3	(Australia) Christopher O'Connell	(Australia) Jacob Grills (Australia) Rinky Hijikata	(Australia) Calum Puttergill (Switzerland) Luca Castelnuovo (United States) Dusty Boyer (Australia) Aaron Addison
March 25	Mornington, Australia; Clay; M15; Singles and doubles draws	(Australia) Calum Puttergill (Australia) Brandon Walkin; 1–6, 6–3, [10–8]	(Australia) Aaron Addison (India) Karunuday Singh	(Australia) Jacob Grills (Australia) Rinky Hijikata	(Australia) Calum Puttergill (Switzerland) Luca Castelnuovo (United States) Dusty Boyer (Australia) Aaron Addison
March 25	Opatija, Croatia; Clay; M15; Singles and doubles draws	(Hungary) Máté Valkusz; 6–4, 6–1	(Bosnia and Herzegovina) Nerman Fatić	(Slovenia) Nik Razboršek (Latvia) Mārtiņš Podžus	(Belgium) Jeroen Vanneste (France) Maxime Chazal (Slovenia) Mike Urbanija (Sweden) Markus Eriksson
March 25	Opatija, Croatia; Clay; M15; Singles and doubles draws	(Croatia) Ivan Sabanov (Croatia) Matej Sabanov; 6–1, 6–4	(Czech Republic) Ondřej Krstev (Czech Republic) Robin Staněk	(Slovenia) Nik Razboršek (Latvia) Mārtiņš Podžus	(Belgium) Jeroen Vanneste (France) Maxime Chazal (Slovenia) Mike Urbanija (Sweden) Markus Eriksson
March 25	Sharm El Sheikh, Egypt; Hard; M15; Singles and doubles draws	(Netherlands) Igor Sijsling; 6–2, 3–6, 6–1	(Brazil) Gilbert Soares Klier Júnior	(Colombia) Eduardo Struvay (Poland) Kacper Żuk	(Germany) Robert Strombachs (Netherlands) Botic van de Zandschulp (Spain) José Francisco Vidal Azorín (Spain) Pablo Vivero González
March 25	Sharm El Sheikh, Egypt; Hard; M15; Singles and doubles draws	(Ukraine) Marat Deviatiarov (Switzerland) Jakub Paul; 6–3, 6–4	(Poland) Daniel Michalski (Poland) Kacper Żuk	(Colombia) Eduardo Struvay (Poland) Kacper Żuk	(Germany) Robert Strombachs (Netherlands) Botic van de Zandschulp (Spain) José Francisco Vidal Azorín (Spain) Pablo Vivero González
March 25	Tel Aviv, Israel; Hard; M15; Singles and doubles draws	(Réunion) Quentin Robert; 6–3, 2–6, 6–1	(Israel) Edan Leshem	(Israel) Yshai Oliel (Germany) Dominik Böhler	(Italy) Alessandro Bega (United States) Peter Kobelt (Israel) Ben Patael (Israel) Alon Elia
March 25	Tel Aviv, Israel; Hard; M15; Singles and doubles draws	(Russia) Alexander Igoshin (Portugal) Bernardo Saraiva; 6–4, 7–6^{(11–9)}	(France) Ugo Blanchet (Réunion) Quentin Robert	(Israel) Yshai Oliel (Germany) Dominik Böhler	(Italy) Alessandro Bega (United States) Peter Kobelt (Israel) Ben Patael (Israel) Alon Elia
March 25	Tsukuba, Japan; Hard; M15; Singles and doubles draws	(Japan) Shintaro Imai; 6–4, 6–4	(Japan) Jumpei Yamasaki	(Netherlands) Mick Veldheer (Japan) Naoki Tajima	(Japan) Ryohei Tagata (United States) Gage Brymer (Japan) Yuta Shimizu (Japan) Yuki Mochizuki
March 25	Tsukuba, Japan; Hard; M15; Singles and doubles draws	(Chinese Taipei) Hsu Yu-hsiou (Japan) Shintaro Imai; 1–6, 6–1, [10–7]	(Australia) Blake Ellis (Australia) Michael Look	(Netherlands) Mick Veldheer (Japan) Naoki Tajima	(Japan) Ryohei Tagata (United States) Gage Brymer (Japan) Yuta Shimizu (Japan) Yuki Mochizuki
March 25	Cancún, Mexico; Hard; M15; Singles and doubles draws	(Argentina) Facundo Mena; 4–6, 6–3, 6–1	(Peru) Juan Pablo Varillas	(Peru) Nicolás Álvarez (Ecuador) Diego Hidalgo	(Slovenia) Matic Špec (Mexico) Lucas Gómez (Mexico) Gerardo López Villaseñor (Finland) Emil Ruusuvuori
March 25	Cancún, Mexico; Hard; M15; Singles and doubles draws	(Guatemala) Wilfredo González (Dominican Republic) José Olivares; 6–2, 6–7^{(3–7)}, [10–8]	(Brazil) Mateus Alves (Brazil) Karue Sell	(Peru) Nicolás Álvarez (Ecuador) Diego Hidalgo	(Slovenia) Matic Špec (Mexico) Lucas Gómez (Mexico) Gerardo López Villaseñor (Finland) Emil Ruusuvuori
March 25	Tabarka, Tunisia; Clay; M15; Singles and doubles draws	(France) Geoffrey Blancaneaux; 6–2, 7–5	(Spain) Nikolás Sánchez Izquierdo	(Argentina) Mariano Kestelboim (France) Pierre Delage	(Italy) Lorenzo Bocchi (Romania) Filip Cristian Jianu (France) Florent Diep (Monaco) Lucas Catarina
March 25	Tabarka, Tunisia; Clay; M15; Singles and doubles draws	(Peru) Alexander Merino (Germany) Christoph Negritu; 6–2, 6–2	(France) Geoffrey Blancaneaux (France) Clément Tabur	(Argentina) Mariano Kestelboim (France) Pierre Delage	(Italy) Lorenzo Bocchi (Romania) Filip Cristian Jianu (France) Florent Diep (Monaco) Lucas Catarina
March 25	Antalya, Turkey; Clay; M15; Singles and doubles draws	(Czech Republic) Václav Šafránek; 4–6, 6–1, 6–2	(Germany) Marvin Netuschil	(Brazil) Wilson Leite (Brazil) Felipe Meligeni Alves	(Kazakhstan) Dmitry Popko (Russia) Kristian Lozan (Russia) Denis Klok (Russia) Dimitriy Voronin
March 25	Antalya, Turkey; Clay; M15; Singles and doubles draws	(Brazil) Felipe Meligeni Alves (Brazil) Christian Oliveira; 6–2, 6–1	(Italy) Luca Tomasetto (Italy) Georg Winkler	(Brazil) Wilson Leite (Brazil) Felipe Meligeni Alves	(Kazakhstan) Dmitry Popko (Russia) Kristian Lozan (Russia) Denis Klok (Russia) Dimitriy Voronin
