= 2014 Tilia Slovenia Open – Doubles =

Doubles
- 2014 Tilia Slovenia Open

Final
- Champion: (Belarus) Sergey Betov (Belarus) Alexander Bury
- Runner-up: (Serbia) Ilija Bozoljac (Italy) Flavio Cipolla
- Score: 6–0, 6–3

Events
Singles	Doubles
← 2013 ·	Tilia Slovenia Open	· 2015 →

Marin Draganja and Mate Pavić were the defending champions but chose not to compete.

Sergey Betov and Alexander Bury won the tournament, beating Ilija Bozoljac and Flavio Cipolla 6–0, 6–3

== Seeds ==
1. (Russia) Victor Baluda / (Russia) Konstantin Kravchuk (semifinals)
2. (Belarus) Sergey Betov / (Belarus) Alexander Bury
3. (Spain) Adrián Menéndez-Maceiras / (Croatia) Franco Skugor (quarterfinals)
4. (Australia) Jordan Kerr / (France) Fabrice Martin (first round)

== Draw ==
=== Key ===
- Q = Qualifier
- WC = Wild card
- LL = Lucky loser
- Alt = Alternate
- SE = Special exempt
- PR = Protected ranking
- ITF = ITF entry
- JE = Junior exempt
- w/o = Walkover
- r = Retired
- d = Defaulted
- SR = Special ranking

=== Draw ===
First round
1	(Russia) V Baluda (Russia) K Kravchuk	5	7^{7}	[10]
(Uruguay) A Behar (United States) V Mirzadeh	7	6^{2}	[8]
(Belarus) E Gerasimov (France) D Guez	6	6
(United Kingdom) D Cox (Belgium) N Desein	1	3
3	(Spain) A Menéndez-Maceiras (Croatia) F Skugor	7	6
(Lithuania) L Grigelis (Croatia) N Mektić	5	3
(Serbia) I Bozoljac (Italy) F Cipolla	6	6
(Italy) T Fabbiano (Italy) L Vanni	4	4
WC	(Slovenia) T Kočevar-Dešman (Slovenia) M Urbanija	6^{4}	7^{7}	[9]
WC	(Slovenia) Matjaz Jurman (Slovenia) Gregor Repina	7^{7}	6^{4}	[11]
(United Kingdom) J Delgado (Luxembourg) G Müller	6	6
4	(Australia) J Kerr (France) F Martin	3	2
WC	(Slovenia) Rok Jarc (Slovenia) Aljaz Jakob Kaplja	3	2
(Canada) S Diez (Spain) R Ortega-Olmedo	6	6
(Philippines) R Gonzales (United Kingdom) S Thornley	3	2
2	(Belarus) S Betov (Belarus) A Bury	6	6

Quarterfinals
1	(Russia) V Baluda (Russia) K Kravchuk	4	7	[10]
(Belarus) E Gerasimov (France) D Guez	6	5	[7]
3	(Spain) A Menéndez-Maceiras (Croatia) F Skugor	1	7	[10]
(Serbia) I Bozoljac (Italy) F Cipolla	6	5	[12]
WC	(Slovenia) M Jurman (Slovenia) G Repina	4	3
(United Kingdom) J Delgado (Luxembourg) G Müller	6	6
(Canada) S Diez (Spain) R Ortega-Olmedo
2	(Belarus) S Betov (Belarus) A Bury	w/o

Semifinals
1	(Russia) V Baluda (Russia) K Kravchuk	6^{6}	4
(Serbia) I Bozoljac (Italy) F Cipolla	7^{8}	6
(United Kingdom) J Delgado (Luxembourg) G Müller	3	4
2	(Belarus) S Betov (Belarus) A Bury	6	6

Final
(Serbia) I Bozoljac (Italy) F Cipolla	0	3
2	(Belarus) S Betov (Belarus) A Bury	6	6
