= 2013 Tilia Slovenia Open – Doubles =

Doubles
- 2013 Tilia Slovenia Open

Final
- Champions: (Croatia) Marin Draganja (Croatia) Mate Pavić
- Runners-up: (Slovenia) Aljaž Bedene (Slovenia) Blaž Rola
- Score: 6–3, 1–6, [10–5]

Events
Singles	Doubles
Tilia Slovenia Open	· 2014 →

Marin Draganja and Mate Pavić won the inaugural tournament, beating Aljaž Bedene and Blaž Rola 6–3, 1–6, [10–5].

== Seeds ==
1. (Croatia) Marin Draganja / (Croatia) Mate Pavić (champions)
2. (Brazil) Marcelo Demoliner / (Austria) Maximilian Neuchrist (quarterfinals)
3. (Slovakia) Karol Beck / (Belarus) Uladzimir Ignatik (quarterfinals)
4. (Italy) Flavio Cipolla / (Italy) Matteo Viola (first round)

== Draw ==
=== Key ===
- Q = Qualifier
- WC = Wild card
- LL = Lucky loser
- Alt = Alternate
- SE = Special exempt
- PR = Protected ranking
- ITF = ITF entry
- JE = Junior exempt
- w/o = Walkover
- r = Retired
- d = Defaulted
- SR = Special ranking

=== Draw ===
First round
1	(Croatia) M Draganja (Croatia) M Pavić	6	2
WC	(Slovenia) T Kočevar-Dešman (Slovenia) M Urbanija	1	4^{r}
Alt	(Brazil) A Ghem (Netherlands) S Groen	6	6
(Kazakhstan) E Korolev (Ukraine) A Kudryavtsev	3	2
4	(Italy) F Cipolla (Italy) M Viola	2	1
(Spain) A Menéndez-Maceiras (Spain) G Olaso	6	6
(Bosnia and Herzegovina) M Bašić (Canada) F Dancevic	7	6
(France) S Robert (New Zealand) A Sitak	5	3
(Republic of Ireland) J Cluskey (France) F Martin	6^{3}	4
(Slovenia) A Bedene (Slovenia) B Rola	7^{7}	6
(Italy) R Ghedin (Italy) C Grassi	2	4
3	(Slovakia) K Beck (Belarus) U Ignatik	6	6
WC	(Slovenia) Gregor Breskvar (Slovenia) Jaka Kaplja	2	1
(Spain) A Brugués-Davi (United Kingdom) D Walsh	6	6
WC	(Slovenia) Miha Mlakar (Slovenia) T Žitnik	3	4
2	(Brazil) M Demoliner (Austria) M Neuchrist	6	6

Quarterfinals
1	(Croatia) M Draganja (Croatia) M Pavić	6	6
Alt	(Brazil) A Ghem (Netherlands) S Groen	1	4
(Spain) A Menéndez-Maceiras (Spain) G Olaso	w/o
(Bosnia and Herzegovina) M Bašić (Canada) F Dancevic
(Slovenia) A Bedene (Slovenia) B Rola	7^{7}	6
3	(Slovakia) K Beck (Belarus) U Ignatik	6^{3}	2
(Spain) A Brugués-Davi (United Kingdom) D Walsh	w/o
2	(Brazil) M Demoliner (Austria) M Neuchrist

Semifinals
1	(Croatia) M Draganja (Croatia) M Pavić	4	6	[10]
(Spain) A Menéndez-Maceiras (Spain) G Olaso	6	3	[3]
(Slovenia) A Bedene (Slovenia) B Rola	w/o
(Spain) A Brugués-Davi (United Kingdom) D Walsh

Final
1	(Croatia) M Draganja (Croatia) M Pavić	6	1	[10]
(Slovenia) A Bedene (Slovenia) B Rola	3	6	[5]
