= 2013 Tilia Slovenia Open – Singles =

Singles
- 2013 Tilia Slovenia Open

Final
- Champion: (Slovenia) Grega Žemlja
- Runner-up: (Austria) Martin Fischer
- Score: 6–4, 7–5

Events
Singles	Doubles
Tilia Slovenia Open	· 2014 →

Grega Žemlja defeated Martin Fischer 6–4, 7–5 in the final to win the first edition of the tournament.

== Seeds ==
1. (Slovenia) Grega Žemlja
2. (Russia) Evgeny Donskoy (quarterfinals)
3. (Slovenia) Aljaž Bedene (semifinals)
4. (Slovenia) Blaž Kavčič (first round)
5. (Italy) Matteo Viola (first round)
6. (Italy) Flavio Cipolla (quarterfinals)
7. (Belarus) Uladzimir Ignatik (quarterfinals)
8. (France) Stéphane Robert (second round)

== Draw ==
=== Key ===
- Q = Qualifier
- WC = Wild card
- LL = Lucky loser
- Alt = Alternate
- SE = Special exempt
- PR = Protected ranking
- ITF = ITF entry
- JE = Junior exempt
- w/o = Walkover
- r = Retired
- d = Defaulted
- SR = Special ranking

=== Finals ===
Semifinals
1	(Slovenia) Grega Žemlja	6^{5}	7	6
3	(Slovenia) Aljaž Bedene	7^{7}	5	2
(Spain) Adrián Menéndez Maceiras	6	3	3
(Austria) Martin Fischer	3	6	6

Final
1	(Slovenia) Grega Žemlja	6	7
(Austria) Martin Fischer	4	5

=== Top half ===
First round
1	(Slovenia) G Žemlja	6	6
LL	(Belarus) E Gerasimov	4	3
(Slovakia) K Beck	6	6
(Slovenia) B Rola	1	3
WC	(Slovenia) T Kočevar-Dešman	3	0
(Czech Republic) Michal Konečný	6	6
(Spain) A Brugués Davi	6	6
5	(Italy) M Viola	4	4
3	(Slovenia) A Bedene	7^{7}	6
(France) F Martin	6^{0}	0
(Kazakhstan) E Korolev	1	4
Q	(Croatia) F Veger	6	6
(Brazil) A Ghem	6	6
LL	(Croatia) T Androić	3	3
(Croatia) M Pavić	6^{3}	2
6	(Italy) F Cipolla	7^{7}	6

Second round
1	(Slovenia) G Žemlja	6	6
(Slovakia) K Beck	4	2
(Czech Republic) M Konečný	3	4
(Spain) A Brugués Davi	6	2^{r}
3	(Slovenia) A Bedene	6	6
Q	(Croatia) F Veger	0	3
(Brazil) A Ghem	4	6	2
6	(Italy) F Cipolla	6	4	6

Quarterfinals
1	(Slovenia) G Žemlja	6	6
(Czech Republic) M Konečný	4	4
3	(Slovenia) A Bedene	6	7^{7}
6	(Italy) F Cipolla	3	6^{3}

Semifinals
1	(Slovenia) G Žemlja	6^{5}	7	6
3	(Slovenia) A Bedene	7^{7}	5	2

=== Bottom half ===
First round
7	(Belarus) U Ignatik	6	1
(France) V Millot	2	0^{r}
Q	(Slovenia) N Razboršek	4	3
(Spain) G Olaso	6	6
(Italy) R Ghedin	7^{7}	6
(Bosnia and Herzegovina) M Bašić	6^{4}	4
(Spain) A Menéndez Maceiras	2	2
4	(Slovenia) B Kavčič	6	0^{r}
8	(France) S Robert	6	7
WC	(Russia) Stephan Khotulev	4	5
WC	(Slovenia) Marko Lazič	2	1
(Austria) M Fischer	6	6
Q	(Canada) F Dancevic	7	6
Q	(Italy) Erik Crepaldi	5	2
(Brazil) M Demoliner	1	1^{r}
2	(Russia) E Donskoy	6	3

Second round
7	(Belarus) U Ignatik	7^{7}	4
(Spain) G Olaso	6^{2}	1^{r}
(Italy) R Ghedin	5	1
(Spain) A Menéndez Maceiras	7	6
8	(France) S Robert	1	3
(Austria) M Fischer	6	6
Q	(Canada) F Dancevic	0^{r}
2	(Russia) E Donskoy	1

Quarterfinals
7	(Belarus) U Ignatik	5	4
(Spain) A Menéndez Maceiras	7	6
(Austria) M Fischer	6	7^{8}
2	(Russia) E Donskoy	3	6^{6}

Semifinals
(Spain) A Menéndez Maceiras	6	3	3
(Austria) M Fischer	3	6	6
