= 2015 Davis Cup Europe/Africa Zone Group I =

International tennis competition

The Europe and Africa Zone is one of the three zones of the regional Davis Cup competition in 2015.

In the Europe and Africa Zone there are four different groups in which teams compete against each other to advance to the next group. Winners in Group I advance to the World Group play-offs, along with losing teams from the World Group first round. Teams who lose their respective ties will compete in the relegation play-offs, with winning teams remaining in Group I, whereas teams who lose their play-offs will be relegated to the Europe/Africa Group II in 2016.

== Participating teams ==
Seeds: The top three seeds received a bye into the second round.

1. Spain
2. Ukraine
3. Netherlands
4. Israel

Remaining nations:

- Austria
- Denmark
- Lithuania
- Poland
- Romania
- Russia
- Slovakia
- Slovenia
- Sweden

=== Draw ===
Second Round Play-offs
Slagelse, Denmark (indoor hard)
Denmark	2
Sweden	3
Kranj, Slovenia (indoor hard)
Slovenia	5
Lithuania	0

First Round Play-offs
Odense, Denmark (indoor hard)
1	Spain	5
Denmark	0
bye
Sweden
Tel Aviv, Israel (indoor hard)
Slovenia	2
4	Israel	3
Vilnius, Lithuania (indoor hard)
Lithuania	1
2	Ukraine	4

First Round
1	Spain
bye
Novy Urengoy, Russia (indoor hard)
Russia	4
Denmark	1
3	Netherlands
bye
Örebro, Sweden (indoor hard)
Austria	3
Sweden	2
Bratislava, Slovakia (indoor hard)
Slovakia	5
Slovenia	0
Sibiu, Romania (indoor hard)
Romania	5
4	Israel	0
Płock, Poland (indoor hard)
Lithuania	2
Poland	3
bye
2	Ukraine

Second Round
Vladivostok, Russia (indoor hard)
1	Spain	2
Russia	3
Kitzbühel, Austria (clay)
3	Netherlands	3
Austria	2
Constanța, Romania (clay)
Slovakia	3
Romania	2
Szczecin, Poland (indoor hard)
Poland	3
2	Ukraine	1

- Denmark and Lithuania relegated to Group II in 2016.
- Russia, Netherlands, Slovakia, and Poland advance to World Group Play-off.

== First round ==
=== Russia vs. Denmark ===
Russia
4
Sport Complex Gazprom Dobycha Yamburg, Novy Urengoy, Russia
6–8 March 2015
Hard (i)

Denmark
1

			1	2	3	4	5
1	(Russia) (Denmark)	Evgeny Donskoy; Frederik Nielsen	6; 2	3; 6	2; 6	6^{5} 7^{7}
2	(Russia) (Denmark)	Andrey Kuznetsov; Martin Pedersen	6; 1	6; 4	7; 5
3	(Russia) (Denmark)	Konstantin Kravchuk / Andrey Rublev; Thomas Kromann / Frederik Nielsen	6; 1	3; 6	6; 3	6; 4
4	(Russia) (Denmark)	Andrey Kuznetsov; Frederik Nielsen	7; 5	6; 3	6; 2
5	(Russia) (Denmark)	Andrey Rublev; Martin Pedersen	6; 4	6; 3

=== Sweden vs. Austria ===
Sweden
2
Idrottshuset Örebro, Örebro, Sweden
6–8 March 2015
Hard (i)

Austria
3

			1	2	3	4	5
1	(Sweden) (Austria)	Elias Ymer; Jürgen Melzer	6; 4	6; 3	3; 6	2; 6	6; 3
2	(Sweden) (Austria)	Christian Lindell; Andreas Haider-Maurer	3; 6	4; 6	2; 6
3	(Sweden) (Austria)	Johan Brunström / Robert Lindstedt; Jürgen Melzer / Alexander Peya	6; 4	7^{10} 6^{8}	6; 3
4	(Sweden) (Austria)	Elias Ymer; Andreas Haider-Maurer	4; 6	6^{6} 7^{8}	3; 6
5	(Sweden) (Austria)	Christian Lindell; Gerald Melzer	1; 6	1; 6	3; 6

=== Slovakia vs. Slovenia ===
Slovakia
5
Aegon Arena National Tennis Centre, Bratislava, Slovakia
6–8 March 2015
Hard (i)

Slovenia
0

			1	2	3	4	5
1	(Slovakia) (Slovenia)	Martin Kližan; Grega Žemlja	7; 5	6; 3	6; 4
2	(Slovakia) (Slovenia)	Norbert Gombos; Tom Kočevar-Desman	6; 2	6; 4	7^{7} 6^{3}
3	(Slovakia) (Slovenia)	Martin Kližan / Igor Zelenay; Tom Kočevar-Desman / Grega Žemlja	6; 3	6; 4	6; 4
4	(Slovakia) (Slovenia)	Martin Kližan; Tom Kočevar-Desman	6; 1	7^{7} 6^{0}
5	(Slovakia) (Slovenia)	Lukáš Lacko; Mike Urbanija	6; 3	6; 2

=== Romania vs. Israel ===
Romania
5
Sala Transilvania, Sibiu, Romania
6–8 March 2015
Hard (i)

Israel
0

			1	2	3	4	5
1	(Romania) (Israel)	Adrian Ungur; Bar Tzuf Botzer	7; 5	6; 3	6; 0
2	(Romania) (Israel)	Marius Copil; Dudi Sela	6^{3} 7^{7}	7^{7} 6^{3}	6; 4	6; 2
3	(Romania) (Israel)	Florin Mergea / Horia Tecău; Bar Tzuf Botzer / Edan Leshem	6; 3	6; 4	6; 4
4	(Romania) (Israel)	Adrian Ungur; Edan Leshem	6; 4	6; 2
5	(Romania) (Israel)	Marius Copil; Bar Tzuf Botzer	7^{7} 6^{3}	6; 3

=== Poland vs. Lithuania ===
Poland
3
Orlen Arena, Płock, Poland
6–8 March 2015
Hard (i)

Lithuania
2

			1	2	3	4	5
1	(Poland) (Lithuania)	Łukasz Kubot; Ričardas Berankis	2; 6	4; 6	3; 6
2	(Poland) (Lithuania)	Jerzy Janowicz; Laurynas Grigelis	7^{7} 6^{3}	6; 3	6; 3
3	(Poland) (Lithuania)	Łukasz Kubot / Marcin Matkowski; Ričardas Berankis / Laurynas Grigelis	6; 4	6; 4	7^{7} 6^{1}
4	(Poland) (Lithuania)	Jerzy Janowicz; Ričardas Berankis	6; 3	6; 4	6; 2
5	(Poland) (Lithuania)	Kamil Majchrzak; Laurynas Grigelis	4; 6	3; 6

== Second round ==
=== Russia vs. Spain ===
Russia
3
Fetisov Arena, Vladivostok, Russia
17–19 July 2015
Hard (i)

Spain
2

			1	2	3	4	5
1	(Russia) (Spain)	Andrey Rublev; Tommy Robredo	2; 6	2; 6	3; 6
2	(Russia) (Spain)	Karen Khachanov; Pablo Andújar	3; 6	3; 6	2; 6
3	(Russia) (Spain)	Evgeny Donskoy / Konstantin Kravchuk; Marc López / David Marrero	4; 6	7^{7} 6^{3}	5; 7	7; 5	6; 4
4	(Russia) (Spain)	Evgeny Donskoy; Tommy Robredo	6; 3	5; 7	7^{7} 6^{3}	7; 5
5	(Russia) (Spain)	Andrey Rublev; Pablo Andújar	6; 4	7^{7} 6^{4}	6; 3

=== Austria vs. Netherlands ===
Austria
2
Tennis Stadium Kitzbühel, Kitzbühel, Austria
17–19 July 2015
Clay

Netherlands
3

			1	2	3	4	5
1	(Austria) (Netherlands)	Dominic Thiem; Thiemo de Bakker	3; 6	6; 4	7^{7} 6^{5}	3; 6	4; 6
2	(Austria) (Netherlands)	Andreas Haider-Maurer; Robin Haase	6; 3	6; 4	5; 7	7; 5
3	(Austria) (Netherlands)	Oliver Marach / Jürgen Melzer; Robin Haase / Jean-Julien Rojer	3; 6	6^{4} 7^{7}	6^{5} 7^{7}
4	(Austria) (Netherlands)	Dominic Thiem; Robin Haase	4; 6	6^{4} 7^{7}	3; 6
5	(Austria) (Netherlands)	Oliver Marach; Jesse Huta Galung	6; 3	6; 3

=== Romania vs. Slovakia ===
Romania
2
Tenis Club IDU, Constanța, Romania
17–19 July 2015
Clay

Slovakia
3

			1	2	3	4	5
1	(Romania) (Slovakia)	Marius Copil; Norbert Gombos	7^{7} 6^{5}	6^{6} 7^{8}	6; 4	7^{12} 6^{10}
2	(Romania) (Slovakia)	Adrian Ungur; Martin Kližan	4; 6	2; 6	0; 6
3	(Romania) (Slovakia)	Florin Mergea / Horia Tecău; Andrej Martin / Igor Zelenay	5; 7	3; 6	3; 6
4	(Romania) (Slovakia)	Marius Copil; Martin Kližan	6^{3} 7^{7}	3; 6	3; 6
5	(Romania) (Slovakia)	Adrian Ungur; Norbert Gombos	6; 4	6; 4

=== Poland vs. Ukraine ===
Poland
3
Azoty Arena, Szczecin, Poland
17–19 July 2015
Hard (i)

Ukraine
1

			1	2	3	4	5
1	(Poland) (Ukraine)	Jerzy Janowicz; Alexandr Dolgopolov	3; 6	4; 6	6^{3} 7^{7}
2	(Poland) (Ukraine)	Michał Przysiężny; Sergiy Stakhovsky	7^{7} 6^{5}	6; 4	6; 4
3	(Poland) (Ukraine)	Łukasz Kubot / Marcin Matkowski; Alexandr Dolgopolov / Denys Molchanov	6; 3	6; 2	7^{8} 6^{6}
4	(Poland) (Ukraine)	Jerzy Janowicz; Sergiy Stakhovsky	6; 1	7^{7} 6^{3}	3; 6	6; 3
5	(Poland) (Ukraine)	Michał Przysiężny; Alexandr Dolgopolov						not played

== First round play-offs ==
=== Israel vs. Slovenia ===
Israel
3
Drive Inn Arena, Tel Aviv, Israel
17–19 July
Hard (i)

Slovenia
2

			1	2	3	4	5
1	(Israel) (Slovenia)	Dudi Sela; Nik Razboršek	6; 1	6; 3	6; 2
2	(Israel) (Slovenia)	Amir Weintraub; Grega Žemlja	6; 3	6; 2	1; 6	6^{3} 7^{7}	6; 4
3	(Israel) (Slovenia)	Ben Patael / Dudi Sela; Aljaž Radinski / Grega Žemlja	6; 1	6; 2	6; 4
4	(Israel) (Slovenia)	Ben Patael; Aljaž Radinski	4; 6	6; 4	3; 6
5	(Israel) (Slovenia)	Amir Weintraub; Nik Razboršek						w/o

=== Denmark vs. Spain ===
Denmark
0
Odense Idrætshal, Odense, Denmark
18–20 September 2015
Hard (i)

Spain
5

			1	2	3	4	5
1	(Denmark) (Spain)	Mikael Torpegaard; Rafael Nadal	4; 6	3; 6	2; 6
2	(Denmark) (Spain)	Frederik Nielsen; David Ferrer	1; 6	5; 7	2; 6
3	(Denmark) (Spain)	Thomas Kromann / Frederik Nielsen; Rafael Nadal / Fernando Verdasco	4; 6	6; 3	6^{4} 7^{7}	4; 6
4	(Denmark) (Spain)	Frederik Nielsen; Roberto Bautista Agut	3; 6	4; 6
5	(Denmark) (Spain)	Mikael Torpegaard; David Ferrer	1; 6	3; 6

=== Lithuania vs. Ukraine ===
Lithuania
1
Siemens Arena, Vilnius, Lithuania
18–20 September 2015
Hard (i)

Ukraine
4

			1	2	3	4	5
1	(Lithuania) (Ukraine)	Ričardas Berankis; Vladyslav Manafov	6; 4	6; 2	6; 2
2	(Lithuania) (Ukraine)	Laurynas Grigelis; Illya Marchenko	0; 6	1; 6	7^{7} 6^{5}	6; 4	3; 6
3	(Lithuania) (Ukraine)	Ričardas Berankis / Laurynas Grigelis; Illya Marchenko / Denys Molchanov	6^{4} 7^{7}	7^{7} 6^{3}	4; 6	2; 6
4	(Lithuania) (Ukraine)	Ričardas Berankis; Illya Marchenko	5; 7	2; 6	2; 6
5	(Lithuania) (Ukraine)	Lukas Mugevičius; Marat Deviatiarov	1; 6	3; 6

== Second round play-offs ==
=== Denmark vs. Sweden ===
Denmark
2
Antvorskov Hall, Slagelse, Denmark
30 October – 1 November 2015
Hard (i)

Sweden
3

			1	2	3	4	5
1	(Denmark) (Sweden)	Andreas Bjerrehus; Markus Eriksson	7^{7} 6^{5}	7^{7} 6^{5}	6^{3} 7^{7}	6^{3} 7^{7}	7; 9
2	(Denmark) (Sweden)	Frederik Nielsen; Mikael Ymer	5; 7	3; 6	4; 6
3	(Denmark) (Sweden)	Thomas Kromann / Frederik Nielsen; Johan Brunström / Fred Simonsson	6^{3} 7^{7}	6; 2	7^{7} 6^{5}	7^{11} 6^{9}
4	(Denmark) (Sweden)	Frederik Nielsen; Markus Eriksson	6; 2	7^{7} 6^{2}	7^{10} 6^{8}
5	(Denmark) (Sweden)	Christian Sigsgaard; Mikael Ymer	4; 6	0; 6	6; 3	7; 5	2; 6

=== Slovenia vs. Lithuania ===
Slovenia
5
Teniski klub Triglav Kranj, Kranj, Slovenia
30 October – 1 November 2015
Hard (i)

Lithuania
0

			1	2	3	4	5
1	(Slovenia) (Lithuania)	Grega Žemlja; Ričardas Berankis	6; 3	7; 5	6; 2
2	(Slovenia) (Lithuania)	Blaž Rola; Laurynas Grigelis	7^{8} 6^{6}	6; 2	6; 2
3	(Slovenia) (Lithuania)	Blaž Kavčič / Grega Žemlja; Laurynas Grigelis / Lukas Mugevičius	6; 4	7^{7} 6^{1}	6; 4
4	(Slovenia) (Lithuania)	Blaž Rola; Lukas Mugevičius	6; 2	6; 2
5	(Slovenia) (Lithuania)	Tom Kočevar-Desman; Tadas Babelis	6; 2	2; 6	6; 4
