= 2014 Tilia Slovenia Open – Singles =

Singles
- 2014 Tilia Slovenia Open

Final
- Champion: (Slovenia) Blaž Kavčič
- Runner-up: (Luxembourg) Gilles Müller
- Score: 7–5, 6–7^{(4–7)}, 6–1

Events
Singles	Doubles
← 2013 ·	Tilia Slovenia Open	· 2015 →

Grega Žemlja was the defending champion but chose not to compete.

Blaž Kavčič won the tournament, beating Gilles Müller 7–5, 6–7^{(4–7)}, 6–1

== Seeds ==
1. (Slovenia) Blaž Kavčič (champion)
2. (Luxembourg) Gilles Müller (final)
3. (Russia) Evgeny Donskoy (semifinals)
4. (Spain) Adrián Menéndez Maceiras (first round)
5. (Italy) Thomas Fabbiano (quarterfinals)
6. (France) David Guez (second round)
7. (Italy) Flavio Cipolla (first round)
8. (Serbia) Ilija Bozoljac (second round)

== Draw ==
=== Key ===
- Q = Qualifier
- WC = Wild card
- LL = Lucky loser
- Alt = Alternate
- SE = Special exempt
- PR = Protected ranking
- ITF = ITF entry
- JE = Junior exempt
- w/o = Walkover
- r = Retired
- d = Defaulted
- SR = Special ranking

=== Finals ===
Semifinals
1	(Slovenia) Blaž Kavčič	6	6
3	(Russia) Evgeny Donskoy	4	2
(United Kingdom) Kyle Edmund	7^{10}	3	3
2	(Luxembourg) Gilles Müller	6^{8}	6	6

Final
1	(Slovenia) Blaž Kavčič	7	6^{4}	6
2	(Luxembourg) Gilles Müller	5	7^{7}	1

=== Top half ===
First round
1	(Slovenia) B Kavčič	6	6
WC	(Slovenia) Aljaz Jakob Kaplja	0	0
(Canada) S Diez	4	7	4
(Venezuela) R Rodríguez-Pace	6	5	6
WC	(Slovenia) T Ternar	2	2
Q	(Slovenia) T Kočevar-Dešman	6	6
LL	(Croatia) N Mektić	6	6
7	(Italy) F Cipolla	2	4
3	(Russia) E Donskoy	6	6
(Spain) R Ortega Olmedo	2	1
Q	(Croatia) F Veger	6	6
(France) L Lokoli	4	3
(Italy) L Vanni	6	6
Q	(Italy) Erik Crepaldi	3	2
(Brazil) R Hocevar	2	2
5	(Italy) T Fabbiano	6	6

Second round
1	(Slovenia) B Kavčič	6	6
(Venezuela) R Rodríguez-Pace	4	1
Q	(Slovenia) T Kočevar-Dešman	2	6^{1}
LL	(Croatia) N Mektić	6	7^{7}
3	(Russia) E Donskoy	6	6
Q	(Croatia) F Veger	1	3
(Italy) L Vanni	6^{4}	6	3
5	(Italy) T Fabbiano	7^{7}	3	6

Quarterfinals
1	(Slovenia) B Kavčič	6	6
LL	(Croatia) N Mektić	2	4
3	(Russia) E Donskoy	6	6
5	(Italy) T Fabbiano	1	2

Semifinals
1	(Slovenia) B Kavčič	6	6
3	(Russia) E Donskoy	4	2

=== Bottom half ===
First round
8	(Serbia) I Bozoljac	4	6	6
(Slovakia) K Beck	6	3	4
(Belgium) N Desein	7^{8}	0	6
(Czech Republic) Michal Konečný	6^{6}	6	2
(Slovenia) J Semrajc	6	6^{8}	2
(United Kingdom) K Edmund	4	7^{10}	6
(Belarus) E Gerasimov	6	6
4	(Spain) A Menéndez Maceiras	4	3
6	(France) D Guez	4	6	6
(Portugal) R Machado	6	1	2
(Lithuania) L Grigelis	3	2
(United Kingdom) D Cox	6	6
WC	(Slovenia) A Radinski	1	1
(Russia) K Kravchuk	6	6
Q	(Russia) E Karlovskiy	1	2
2	(Luxembourg) G Müller	6	6

Second round
8	(Serbia) I Bozoljac	3	4
(Belgium) N Desein	6	6
(United Kingdom) K Edmund	7	6
(Belarus) E Gerasimov	5	4
6	(France) D Guez	2	0
(United Kingdom) D Cox	6	6
(Russia) K Kravchuk	6^{2}	2
2	(Luxembourg) G Müller	7^{7}	6

Quarterfinals
(Belgium) N Desein	4	4
(United Kingdom) K Edmund	6	6
(United Kingdom) D Cox	4	3
2	(Luxembourg) G Müller	6	6

Semifinals
(United Kingdom) K Edmund	7^{10}	3	3
2	(Luxembourg) G Müller	6^{8}	6	6
