= Danylo Kalenichenko =

Ukrainian tennis player

Danylo Kalenichenko Данило Каленіченко
- Full name: Danylo Serhiyovych Kalenichenko
- Country (sports): Ukraine
- Residence: Bratislava, Slovakia
- Born: 2 February 1994 (age 32) Kyiv, Ukraine
- Height: 1.88 m (6 ft 2 in)
- Retired: November 2021 (last match played)
- Plays: Right-handed (two handed-backhand)
- Prize money: $74,362

Singles
- Career record: 0–1 (at ATP Tour level, Grand Slam level, and in Davis Cup)
- Career titles: 0 Challenger, 4 Futures
- Highest ranking: No. 439 (13 January 2020)

Doubles
- Career record: 0–0 (at ATP Tour level, Grand Slam level, and in Davis Cup)
- Career titles: 0 Challenger, 18 Futures
- Highest ranking: No. 378 (22 October 2018)

Team competitions
- Davis Cup: 0–1
- Last updated on: 15 November 2025.

Danylo Serhiyovych Kalenichenko (Ukrainian: Данило Сергійович Каленіченко; born 2 February 1994) is a Ukrainian former tennis player. Kalenichenko has a career high ATP singles ranking of World No. 439 achieved on 13 January 2020. He also has a career high ATP doubles ranking of World No. 378 achieved on 22 October 2018.

Kalenichenko has reached seven career singles finals, with a record of 4 wins and 3 losses. Additionally, he has reached 30 career doubles finals with a record of 18 wins and 12 losses. All 37 combined finals have come at the ITF Futures level.

Kalenichenko has represented Ukraine at the Davis Cup where he has a W/L record of 0–1.

== ATP Challenger and ITF Futures finals ==
=== Singles: 7 (4–3) ===
Legend ATP Challenger (0–0) ITF Futures (4–3)	Finals by surface Hard (2–3) Clay (1–0) Grass (0–0) Carpet (1–0)

Result	W–L	Date	Tournament	Tier	Surface	Opponent	Score
Win	1–0	Oct 2016	Germany F13, Hambach	Futures	Carpet	(Czech Republic) Marek Jaloviec	3–6, 6–1, 7–5
Win	2–0	Jul 2017	Slovakia F1, Trnava	Futures	Clay	(Russia) Artem Dubrivnyy	6–4, 3–6, 6–2
Loss	2–1	Feb 2019	M25 Barnstaple, Great Britain	World Tennis Tour	Hard	(Netherlands) Tim van Rijthoven	6–7^{(5–7)}, 6–3, 1–6
Loss	2–2	Apr 2019	M25+H Abuja, Nigeria	World Tennis Tour	Hard	(France) Tom Jomby	1–6, 6–7^{(4–7)}
Win	3–2	Dec 2019	M15 Nonthaburi, Thailand	World Tennis Tour	Hard	(Japan) Makoto Ochi	6–4, 6–4
Loss	3–3	Dec 2019	M15 Doha, Qatar	World Tennis Tour	Hard	(Bulgaria) Dimitar Kuzmanov	0–6, 4–6
Win	4–3	Mar 2020	M15 Trnava, Slovakia	World Tennis Tour	Hard	(Latvia) Karlis Ozolins	6–4, 6–4

=== Doubles: 30 (18–12) ===
Legend ATP Challenger (0–0) ITF Futures (18–12)	Finals by surface Hard (3–5) Clay (13–6) Grass (0–0) Carpet (2–1)

Result	W–L	Date	Tournament	Tier	Surface	Partner	Opponents	Score
Win	1–0	Sep 2013	Austria F10, St. Poelten	Futures	Clay	(Slovakia) Adrian Partl	(Australia) Ryan Agar (Austria) Sebastian Bader	6–3, 6–2
Loss	1–1	Oct 2013	Turkey F42, Antalya	Futures	Hard	(Slovakia) Adrian Partl	(Slovakia) Filip Horansky (Netherlands) Matwé Middelkoop	4–6, 3–6
Loss	1–2	Aug 2014	Slovakia F3, Piešťany	Futures	Clay	(Portugal) Gonçalo Oliveira	(Slovakia) Karol Beck (Ukraine) Filipp Kekercheni	2–6, 6–2, [8–10]
Loss	1–3	May 2015	Bosnia & Herzegovina F1, Doboj	Futures	Clay	(Slovakia) Juraj Masar	(Croatia) Joško Topić (Croatia) Nino Serdarušić	6–2, 4–6, [10–12]
Loss	1–4	May 2015	Bosnia & Herzegovina F2, Prijedor	Futures	Clay	(Slovakia) Juraj Masar	(Croatia) Ivan Sabanov (Croatia) Matej Sabanov	walkover
Win	2–4	Jun 2015	Slovenia F1, Maribor	Futures	Clay	(Portugal) Gonçalo Oliveira	(Slovenia) Rok Jarc (Slovenia) Mike Urbanija	6–4, 7–6^{(7–3)}
Win	3–4	Jun 2015	Slovenia F3, Ljubljana	Futures	Clay	(Portugal) Gonçalo Oliveira	(Austria) Lucas Miedler (Austria) Maximilian Neuchrist	7–5, 7–6^{(7–3)}
Win	4–4	Jul 2015	Germany F6, Saarlouis	Futures	Clay	(Croatia) Duje Kekez	(Egypt) Sherif Abohabaga (Germany) Benjamin Hassan	6–3, 6–2
Loss	4–5	Oct 2015	Belarus F3, Minsk	Futures	Hard	(Slovakia) Adrian Sikora	(Belarus) Andrei Vasilevski (Belarus) Dzmitry Zhyrmont	2–6, 4–6
Win	5–5	Jan 2016	Germany F2, Kaarst	Futures	Carpet	(Germany) Denis Kapric	(Kazakhstan) Alexander Bublik (Poland) Hubert Hurkacz	6–7^{(2–7)}, 6–4, [10–7]
Win	6–5	Mar 2016	Azerbaijan F5, Baku	Futures	Carpet	(Ukraine) Marat Deviatiarov	(Russia) Alexander Igoshin (Russia) Yan Sabanin	6–4, 6–4
Loss	6–6	May 2016	Bosnia & Herzegovina F1, Doboj	Futures	Clay	(Austria) David Pichler	(Romania) Victor Vlad Cornea (Croatia) Nino Serdarušić	0–6, 6–2, [8–10]
Win	7–6	Jun 2016	Romania F5, Arad	Futures	Clay	(Austria) David Pichler	(Romania) Victor Vlad Cornea (Romania) Victor-Mugurel Anagnastopol	6–4, 6–1
Win	8–6	Jul 2016	Czech Republic F6, Brno	Futures	Clay	(Austria) David Pichler	(Czech Republic) Dominik Kellovský (Czech Republic) Václav Šafránek	6–4, 4–6, [10–8]
Win	9–6	Jul 2016	Slovakia F1, Trnava	Futures	Clay	(Ukraine) Filipp Kekercheni	(Slovakia) Karol Beck (Russia) Artem Dubrivnyy	6–0, 6–1
Win	10–6	Aug 2016	Slovakia F2, Piešťany	Futures	Clay	(Austria) David Pichler	(Canada) Martin Beran (Australia) Scott Puodziunas	6–2, 6–0
Loss	10–7	Dec 2016	Czech Republic F11, Říčany	Futures	Hard	(Ukraine) Filipp Kekercheni	(Poland) Mateusz Kowalczyk (Poland) Grzegorz Panfil	4–6, 2–6
Loss	10–8	May 2017	Ukraine F2, Cherkassy	Futures	Clay	(Ukraine) Oleksandr Bielinskyi	(Italy) Riccardo Bonadio (Italy) Pietro Rondoni	6–4, 1–6, [7–10]
Win	11–8	Jul 2017	Slovakia F1, Trnava	Futures	Clay	(Ukraine) Filipp Kekercheni	(Slovakia) Lukas Klein (Slovakia) Patrik Nema	6–2, 5–7, [10–8]
Win	12–8	Sep 2017	Hungary F8, Székesfehérvár	Futures	Clay	(Japan) Sora Fakuda	(Czech Republic) ONDREJ Krstev (Czech Republic) Patrik Riki	6–4, 6–4
Loss	12–9	Feb 2018	Tunisia F6, Jerba	Futures	Hard	(Poland) Michal Dembek	(Russia) Alen Avidzba (France) Matteo Martineau	6–7^{(6–8)}, 7–6^{(7–5)}, [9–11]
Win	13–9	Mar 2018	Israel F3, Tel Aviv	Futures	Hard	(Ukraine) Volodymyr Uzhylovskyi	(Finland) Harri Heliövaara (Finland) Patrik Niklas-Salminen	7–5, 6–3
Loss	13–10	Apr 2018	Nigeria F2, Abuja	Futures	Hard	(Switzerland) Mirko Martinez	(India) Arjun Kadhe (United States) Ronnie Schneider	2–6, 3–6
Win	14–10	Aug 2018	Slovakia F3, Bratislava	Futures	Clay	(Slovakia) Filip Polášek	(Czech Republic) Petr Michnev (Czech Republic) Antonin Stepanek	6–3, 6–2
Win	15–10	Aug 2018	Hungary F6, Győr	Futures	Clay	(Slovakia) Filip Polášek	(France) Sadio Doumbia (France) Fabien Reboul	6–4, 3–6, [19–17]
Win	16–10	Oct 2018	Nigeria F4, Lagos	Futures	Hard	(Brazil) Diego Matos	(United States) William Bushamuka (France) Arthur Rinderknech	2–6, 7–5, [10–7]
Loss	16–11	Jan 2019	M25 Nussloch, Germany	World Tennis Tour	Carpet	(Czech Republic) Marek Gengel	(Poland) Szymon Walków (Poland) Karol Drzewiecki	5–7, 3–6
Win	17–11	Aug 2019	M25 Bolzano, Italy	World Tennis Tour	Clay	(Kazakhstan) Denis Yevseyev	(Italy) Gianluca Di Nicola (Italy) Nicolo Inserra	6–2, 6–2
Loss	17–12	Sep 2019	M15 Székesfehérvár, Hungary	World Tennis Tour	Clay	(Austria) David Pichler	(Czech Republic) Petr Nouza (Czech Republic) Michael Vrbenský	7–5, 1–6, [15–17]
Win	18–12	Dec 2019	M15 Doha, Qatar	World Tennis Tour	Hard	(Belarus) Ivan Liutarevich	(Morocco) Adam Moundir (Japan) Rio Noguchi	6–3, 7–6^{(7–3)}
