= Nik Razboršek =

Slovenian tennis player

- Country (sports): Slovenia
- Residence: Litija, Slovenia
- Born: 4 October 1993 (age 32) Ljubljana, Slovenia
- Height: 1.73 m (5 ft 8 in)
- Turned pro: 2012
- Plays: Left-handed (two-handed backhand)
- Prize money: $51,313

Singles
- Career record: 1–3
- Career titles: 0
- Highest ranking: No. 409 (17 December 2018)

Doubles
- Career record: 0–0
- Career titles: 0
- Highest ranking: No. 625 (17 July 2017)

Team competitions
- Davis Cup: 1–2
- Last updated on: 31 January 2023.

Nik Razboršek (born 4 October 1993) is an inactive Slovenian tennis player.

Razboršek has a career high ATP singles ranking of 409 achieved on 17 December 2018. He also has a career high ATP doubles ranking of 625 achieved on 17 July 2017.

Razboršek has represented Slovenia at Davis Cup, where he has a win–loss record of 1–2. He is a left-handed player with a double-handed backhand.

== Future and Challenger finals ==
=== Singles: 8 (5–3) ===
Legend
ATP Challengers 0 (0–0)
ITF Futures 5 (5–3)

Outcome	No.	Date	Tournament	Surface	Opponent	Score
Winner	1.	10 November 2013	Umag, Croatia F14	Clay	(Croatia) Toni Androić	4–6, 6–2, 6–1
Winner	2.	4 July 2015	Busto Arsizio, Italy F16	Clay	(Slovakia) Ivo Klec	6–1, 6–0
Runner-up	3.	25 June 2017	Kaltenkirchen, Germany F4	Clay	(Spain) Bernabé Zapata Miralles	4–6, 5–7
Winner	4.	29 April 2018	Antalya, Turkey F16	Clay	(Ukraine) Artem Smirnov	6–3, 6–4
Runner-up	5.	16 June 2018	Bergamo, Italy F14	Clay	(Italy) Riccardo Bellotti	4–6, 3–6
Runner-up	6.	26 August 2018	Rotterdam, Netherlands F5	Clay	(France) Manuel Guinard	4–6, 6–7^{(3–7)}
Winner	7.	2 September 2018	Haren, Netherlands F6	Clay	(Slovenia) Tom Kočevar-Dešman	7–6^{(10–8)}, 6–4
Winner	8.	24 February 2019	M15 Antalya, Turkey	Clay	(Spain) Pol Toledo Bagué	7–6^{(7–3)}, 6–3

=== Doubles 11 (4–7) ===
Legend
ATP Challengers 0 (0–0)
ITF Futures 11 (4–7)

Outcome	No.	Date	Tournament	Surface	Partner	Opponents	Score
Runner-up	1.	10 June 2012	Maribor, Slovenia F2	Clay	(Serbia) Miki Janković	(Australia) Alex Bolt (Australia) Andrew Whittington	4–6, 6–7^{(4–7)}
Winner	2.	27 October 2013	Dubrovnik, Croatia F12	Clay	(Slovenia) Mike Urbanija	(Czech Republic) Marek Michalička (Czech Republic) Dominik Süč	7–6^{(7–3)}, 2–6, [10–8]
Winner	3.	17 November 2013	Bol, Croatia F15	Clay	(Slovenia) Mike Urbanija	(Croatia) Stjepan Čagalj (Croatia) Franjo Raspudić	6–4, 6–2
Winner	4.	14 August 2016	Slovenská Ľupča, Slovakia F3	Clay	(France) Grégoire Jacq	(Czech Republic) Petr Michnev (Czech Republic) Pavel Nejedlý	6–1, 6–4
Runner-up	5.	28 August 2016	Pörtschach, Austria F7	Clay	(Hungary) Péter Nagy	(Bolivia) Hugo Dellien (Bolivia) Federico Zeballos	3–6, 0–6
Runner-up	6.	9 October 2016	Bol, Croatia F9	Clay	(Croatia) Nino Serdarušić	(Austria) Pascal Brunner (Austria) Lucas Miedler	2–6, 2–6
Winner	7.	25 June 2017	Kaltenkirchen, Germany F4	Clay	(Slovenia) Tom Kočevar-Dešman	(Germany) Johannes Härteis (Germany) Louis Wessels	6–3, 6–2
Runner-up	8.	2 July 2017	Kamen, Germany F5	Clay	(Slovenia) Tom Kočevar-Dešman	(Germany) Peter Torebko (Germany) George von Massow	3–6, 6–4, [5–10]
Runner-up	9.	28 January 2018	Antalya, Turkey F3	Hard	(Zimbabwe) Benjamin Lock	(Russia) Timur Kiyamov (Russia) Alexander Pavlioutchenkov	2–6, 1–6
Runner-up	10.	3 June 2018	Kiseljak, Bosnia & Herzegovina F3	Clay	(Slovenia) Tom Kočevar-Dešman	(Australia) Dane Propoggia (Australia) Scott Puodziunas	6–2, 6–7^{(5–7)}, [4–10]
Runner-up	11.	17 March 2019	M15 Poreč, Croatia	Clay	(Slovenia) Mike Urbanija	(Germany) Benjamin Hassan (Germany) Constantin Schmitz	2–6, 0–6

== Davis Cup ==
=== Singles performances (1-2) ===
Edition	Round	Date	Against	Surface	Opponent	Result	Outcome
2012 Europe/Africa Zone Group I	2R	04-08-2012	South Africa	Hard	(South Africa) Ruan Roelofse	6–4, 3–6, 6–7^{(2–7)}	Lose
2015 Europe/Africa Zone Group I	1R PO	17-07-2015	Israel	Hard (i)	(Israel) Dudi Sela	1–6, 3–6, 2–6	Lose
2018 Europe/Africa Zone Group II	PO	08-04-2018	Turkey	Clay	(Turkey) Altuğ Çelikbilek	7–5, 6–3	Win
