= Tilia Slovenia Open =

- 2019 Tilia Slovenia Open

Defunct tennis tournament
- Event name: Tilia Slovenia Open
- Location: Portorož, Slovenia
- Venue: Tennis Club Portorož (ŠRC Marina Portorož)
- Category: ATP Challenger Tour
- Surface: Hard (outdoors)
- Draw: 32S/16D
- Prize money: €42,500
- Website: Website

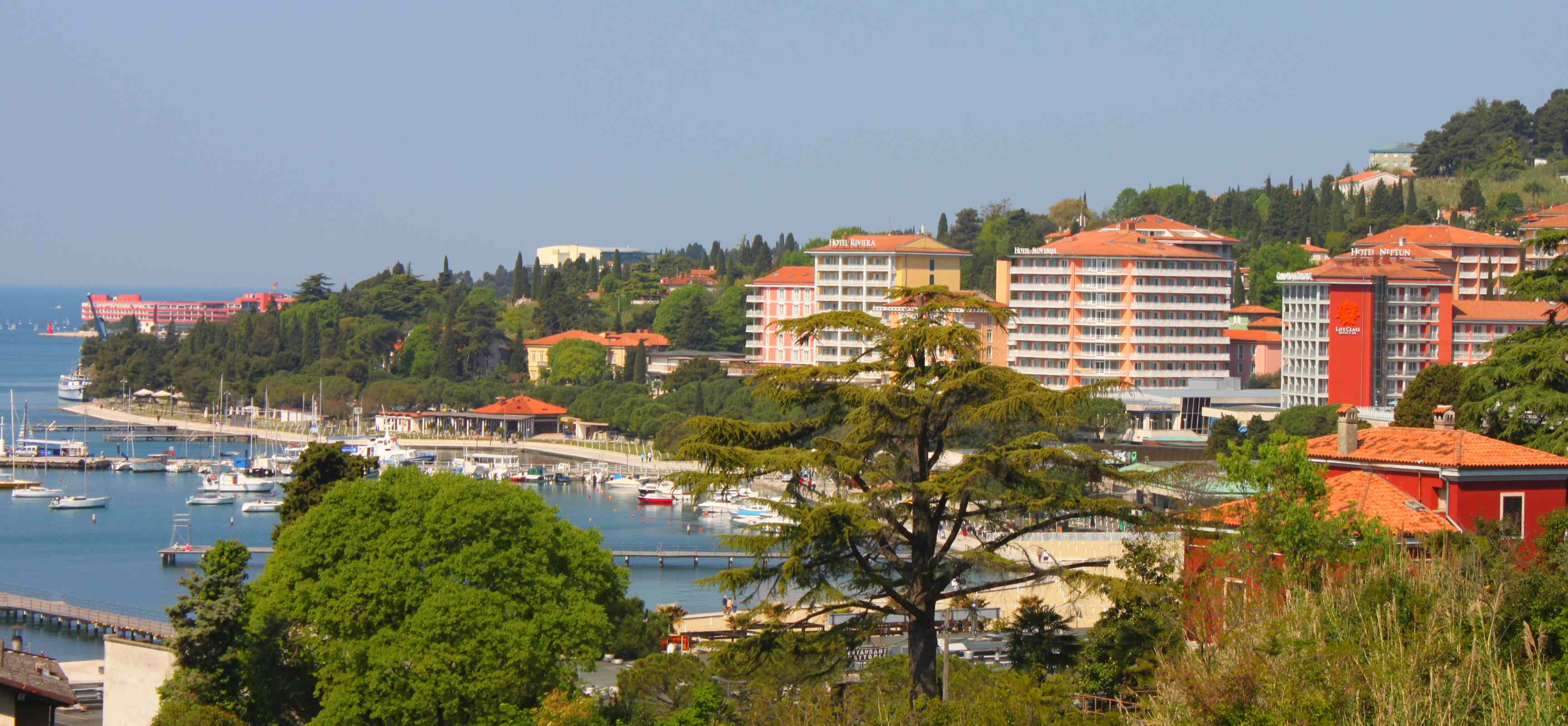
Panorama of the center of coastline town Portorož, Slovenia

The Tilia Slovenia Open was a professional tennis tournament played on outdoor hardcourts in Portorož, Slovenia with the inaugural edition held in 2013. It was part of the ATP Challenger Tour. It was held on the courts of the Sports-Recreational Center Marina Portorož at Tennis Club Portorož.

== Finals ==
=== Singles ===
Year	Champion	Runner-up	Score	Ref.
2019	(Slovenia) Aljaž Bedene	(Norway) Viktor Durasovic	7–5, 6–3	
2018	(France) Constant Lestienne	(Italy) Andrea Arnaboldi	6–2, 6–1	
2017	(Ukraine) Sergiy Stakhovsky	(Italy) Matteo Berrettini	6–7^{(4–7)}, 7–6^{(8–6)}, 6–3	
2016	(Germany) Florian Mayer	(Russia) Daniil Medvedev	6–1, 6–2	
2015	(Italy) Luca Vanni	(Slovenia) Grega Žemlja	6–3, 7–6^{(8–6)}	
2014	(Slovenia) Blaž Kavčič	(Luxembourg) Gilles Müller	7–5, 6–7^{(4–7)}, 6–1	
2013	(Slovenia) Grega Žemlja	(Austria) Martin Fischer	6–4, 7–5	

=== Doubles ===
Year	Champions	Runners-up	Score
2019	(Russia) Teymuraz Gabashvili (Spain) Carlos Gómez-Herrera	(Austria) Lucas Miedler (Austria) Tristan-Samuel Weissborn	6–3, 6–2
2018	(Spain) Gerard Granollers (Czech Republic) Lukáš Rosol	(Serbia) Nikola Ćaćić (Austria) Lucas Miedler	7–5, 6–3
2017	(Chile) Hans Podlipnik Castillo (Belarus) Andrei Vasilevski	(Czech Republic) Lukáš Rosol (Croatia) Franko Škugor	6–3, 7–6^{(7–4)}
2016	(Belarus) Sergey Betov (Belarus) Ilya Ivashka	(Croatia) Tomislav Draganja (Croatia) Nino Serdarušić	1–6, 6–3, [10–4]
2015	(France) Fabrice Martin (India) Purav Raja	(Belarus) Aliaksandr Bury (Sweden) Andreas Siljeström	7–6^{(7–5)}, 4–6, [18–16]
2014	(Belarus) Sergey Betov (Belarus) Aliaksandr Bury	(Serbia) Ilija Bozoljac (Italy) Flavio Cipolla	6–0, 6–3
2013	(Croatia) Marin Draganja (Croatia) Mate Pavić	(Slovenia) Aljaž Bedene (Slovenia) Blaž Rola	6–3, 1–6, [10–5]
