= Mike Urbanija =

Slovenian tennis player

- Full name: Mike Urbanija
- Country (sports): Slovenia
- Residence: Beltinci, Slovenia
- Born: 26 December 1989 (age 36) Murska Sobota, Slovenia
- Plays: Right-handed (two handed-backhand)
- Prize money: $43,112

Singles
- Career record: 0–4 (at ATP Tour level, Grand Slam level, and in Davis Cup)
- Career titles: 0
- Highest ranking: No. 477 (18 August 2014)

Doubles
- Career record: 0–0 (at ATP Tour level, Grand Slam level, and in Davis Cup)
- Career titles: 0
- Highest ranking: No. 541 (12 May 2014)

Mike Urbanija (born 26 December 1989 in Murska Sobota) is an inactive Slovenian tennis player.

Urbanija has a career high ATP singles ranking of No. 477 achieved on 18 August 2014 and a career high ATP doubles ranking of No. 541 achieved on 12 May 2014.

Playing for Slovenia in Davis Cup, Urbanija has a W/L record of 0–3.
