= Tom Kočevar-Dešman =

Slovenian tennis player

- Full name: Tom Kočevar-Dešman
- Country (sports): Slovenia
- Residence: Ljubljana, Slovenia
- Born: 10 July 1990 (age 34); Ljubljana, Slovenia
- Height: 1.80 m (5 ft 11 in)
- Plays: Right-handed (two handed-backhand)
- Coach: Gorazd Gavrilov
- Prize money: $41,291

Singles
- Career record: 2–5 (at ATP Tour level, Grand Slam level, and in Davis Cup)
- Career titles: 0
- Highest ranking: No. 349 (17 August 2015)

Doubles
- Career record: 0–3 (at ATP Tour level, Grand Slam level, and in Davis Cup)
- Career titles: 0
- Highest ranking: No. 514 (22 September 2014)
- Last updated on: 30 January 2023.

Tom Kočevar-Dešman (born 10 July 1990) is an inactive Slovenian tennis player.

Kočevar-Dešman has a career high ATP singles ranking of 349 achieved on 17 August 2015. He also has a career high ATP doubles ranking of 514 achieved on 22 September 2014.

Playing for Slovenia in Davis Cup, Kočevar-Dešman has a W/L record of 1–8.
