= Ilya Ivashka =

Belarusian tennis player (born 1994)

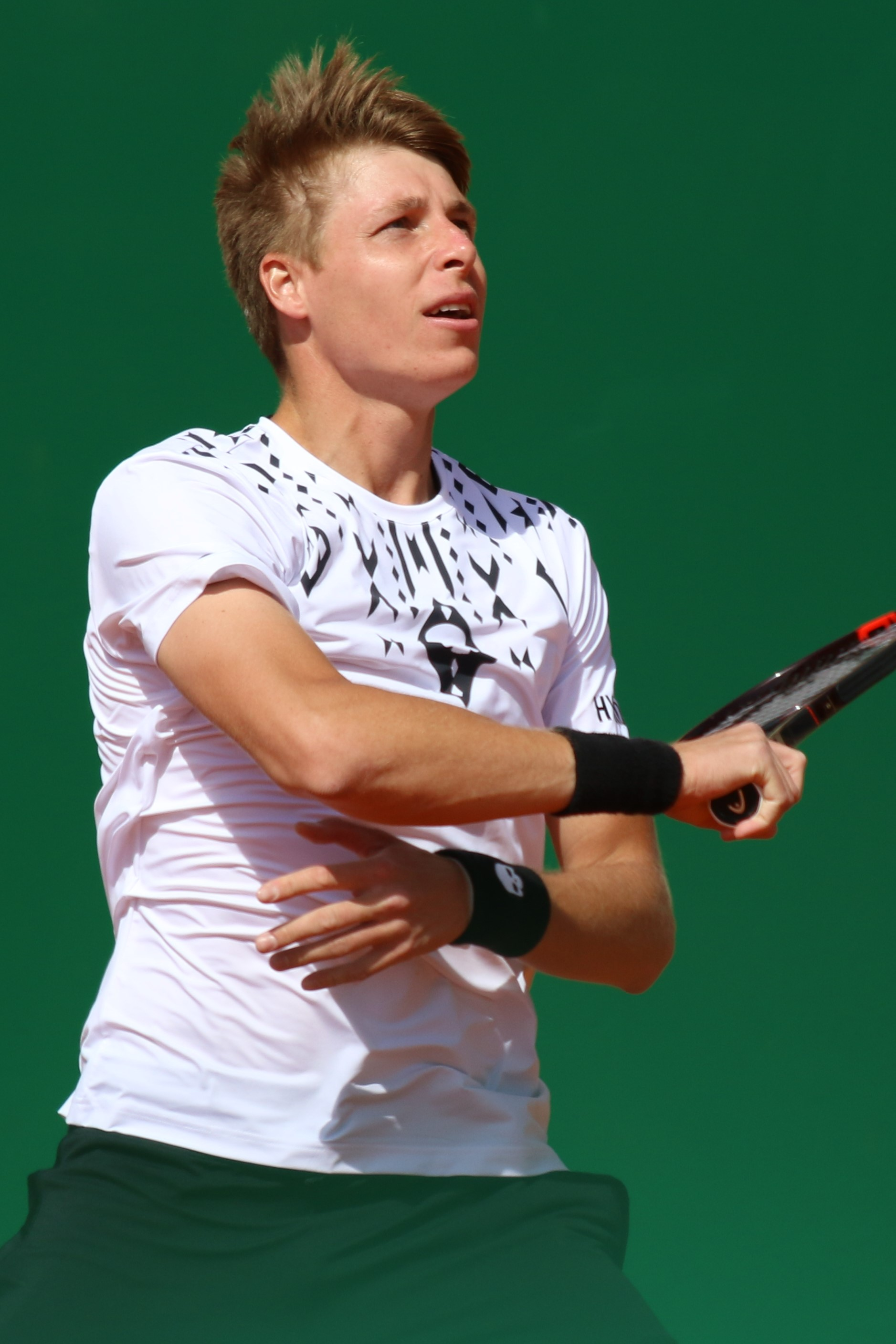
- Ivashka at the 2022 Monte-Carlo Masters
- Native name: Ілья Уладзіміравіч Івашка (Belarusian); Илья Владимирович Ивашко (Russian)
- Country (sports): Belarus
- Residence: Minsk, Belarus
- Born: 24 February 1994 (age 32) Minsk, Belarus
- Height: 1.93 m (6 ft 4 in)
- Turned pro: 2013
- Plays: Right-handed (two handed-backhand)
- Coach: José Checa Calvo (2018–2022), Daniel Navarro Molina (2022–)
- Prize money: US $3,366,411

Singles
- Career record: 89–89
- Career titles: 1
- Highest ranking: No. 40 (20 June 2022)
- Current ranking: No. 234 (21 September 2026)

Grand Slam singles results
- Australian Open: 2R (2019)
- French Open: 2R (2022)
- Wimbledon: 4R (2021)
- US Open: 4R (2022)

Other tournaments
- Olympic Games: 3R (2021)

Doubles
- Career record: 4–15
- Career titles: 0
- Highest ranking: No. 317 (12 June 2023)

Grand Slam doubles results
- French Open: 2R (2023)
- US Open: 1R (2021, 2022)

Other doubles tournaments
- Olympic Games: 1R (2021)

Team competitions
- Davis Cup: 9–10
- Last updated on: 25 September 2026.

Ilya Uladzimiravich Ivashka (Belarusian: Ілья Уладзіміравіч Івашка; Russian: Илья Владимирович Ивашко, romanized: Ilya Vladimirovich Ivashko; born 24 February 1994) is a Belarusian professional tennis player. He has a career-high ATP singles ranking of world No. 40, achieved on 20 June 2022 and a doubles ranking of world No. 317, reached on 12 June 2023. He is the current No. 1 Belarusian player.

Ivashka has won five ATP Challenger Tour singles and one doubles titles. He has represented Belarus in Davis Cup, and has a win-loss record of 9–10.

== Personal life ==
Fellow tennis player Karen Khachanov is his brother in-law, their wives being (twin) sisters.

== Professional career ==
=== 2016-2020: Major & Masters debut & third round, top 100 ===
He entered the top 150 when he hit a career high ranking of No. 147 on 26 February 2018 after reaching as a qualifier the semifinals of the 2018 Open 13 in Marseille, ranked world No. 193, defeating Laslo Djere, second seed Stan Wawrinka 6–4, 1–1 when the Swiss retired, home favourite Nicolas Mahut in three sets. He became the first Belarusian tour-level semifinalist since Max Mirnyi at 2005 Rotterdam.

He entered the top 100 on 13 August 2018 after a third-round run also as a qualifier, where he lost to fourth seed Kevin Anderson, for the first time in his career at a Masters 1000 level at the 2018 Rogers Cup in Toronto, Canada.

=== 2021: Major fourth round, ATP title, top 50 ===
Ivashka reached his first quarterfinal for 2021 at the Andalucia Open where he defeated two Spaniards en route Pedro Martínez and Alejandro Davidovich Fokina, before falling to the eventual finalist third Spaniard Jaume Munar. He reached his second semifinal in his career at the BMW Open in Munich as a qualifier, more than three years after his run to the final four at the 2018 Open 13 in Marseille, in a stunning defeat against the top seed two-time champion and world No. 6, Alexander Zverev, for the biggest win of his career.

He also qualified and reached his third quarterfinal for 2021 at the Eastbourne International defeating Alexei Popyrin. At a career high of world No. 79, achieved on 28 June 2021, on his debut in the main draw at Wimbledon, Ivashka reached the fourth round of a major for the first time in his career defeating Jaume Munar, Jérémy Chardy and Jordan Thompson, having never passed the second round of a major previously. He lost to eventual finalist, seventh seed Matteo Berrettini but reached a career-high of world No. 63 on 12 July 2021.

At the Winston-Salem Open, Ivashka reached his fourth quarterfinal for 2021, defeating ninth seeded Jan-Lennard Struff, and his second semifinal defeating top seed and world No. 12, Pablo Carreño Busta. He then defeated Emil Ruusuvuori to reach his first ATP final and then defeated Mikael Ymer for the title in 56 minutes to become the first player from Belarus to win an ATP Tour singles title since Max Mirnyi in 2003 at Rotterdam. He became the eighth First-Time ATP Tour Champion in 2021. As a result of the victory, he entered the top 60 at world No. 53 on 30 August 2021 for the first time in his career.

At the US Open, he reached the third round for the first time in his career defeating Tennys Sandgren and Vasek Pospisil before losing again to the sixth seed Matteo Berrettini.

A month later after reaching the semifinals at the Astana Open, he made his top 50 debut as world No. 45 on 27 September 2021.

=== 2022: Top 40, US Open fourth round ===
Ivashka withdrew from the Melbourne Summer Set 1, Sydney Classic, and the Australian Open due to a leg injury.

Ivashka played his first tournament of the season at the Open Sud de France. He lost in the first round to Mackenzie McDonald. At the Rotterdam Open, he was defeated in the second round by top seed, world No. 4, and eventual finalist, Stefanos Tsitsipas. Seeded fifth at the Open 13 Provence, he reached the quarterfinals where he lost to third seed, world No. 9, 2020 finalist, and eventual finalist, Félix Auger-Aliassime. In Dubai, he was defeated in the first round by Kwon Soon-woo.

At the Geneva Open, he reached his second quarterfinal of the season, after the one at the Open 13, defeating third seed Denis Shapovalov on the way, before losing to eventual finalist João Sousa. He reached his third quarterfinal at the Rosmalen Open in 's-Hertogenbosch. As a result, he reached the top 40, on 20 June 2022.

At the Atlanta Open, he reached the semifinals before losing to eventual champion Alex de Minaur. At the US Open, he reached the third round for a second time in a row at this major defeating world No. 10 and eight seed Hubert Hurkacz. Next he defeated 26th seed Lorenzo Musetti to reach the fourth round of a major for the second time in his career. He lost to Jannik Sinner in five sets.

At the 2022 Sofia Open he defeated Mikael Ymer in an over 3 hours match and third seed Grigor Dimitrov to reach the quarterfinals.

=== 2023–2026: Hiatus, return to Tour, back to top 250 ===
Ivashka started his 2023 season at the Australian Open but lost in the first round to 32nd seed Botic van de Zandschulp.

In February, Ivashka played at the Dallas Open where he was defeated in the first round by American wildcard Jack Sock. At the Delray Beach Open, he was beaten in the first round by the ninth seed J. J. Wolf. In Doha, he lost in the first round to eighth seed Botic van de Zandschulp. At the Dubai Championships, he fell in the first round of qualifying to Alexander Shevchenko.

In March, he competed at the BNP Paribas Open and got his first win of the season by beating Roman Safiullin. He won his second-round match when his opponent, 28th seed Botic van de Zandschulp, had to retire. In the third round, he lost to fifth seed, world No. 6, and eventual finalist, Daniil Medvedev, in three sets. At the Miami Open, he was defeated in the second round by third seed, world No. 4, and previous year finalist, Casper Ruud.

Ivashka started his clay court season at the Monte-Carlo Masters and after making it past the qualifying stage, he defeated 2021 semifinalist, Dan Evans. He lost in the second round to ninth seed and world No. 12, Karen Khachanov. At the Barcelona Open, he was defeated in the first round by Nuno Borges. In Madrid, he was eliminated from the tournament in the first round by Albert Ramos Viñolas. At the Italian Open, he was beaten in the first round by 2008 finalist Stan Wawrinka. At the BNP Paribas Primrose Bordeaux, he lost in the first round to seventh seed and eventual finalist, Tomás Martín Etcheverry. Ivashka played his final tournament before Roland Garros at the Geneva Open. He beat eighth seed, Adrian Mannarino, in the second round. He lost in his quarterfinal match to second seed and world No. 9, Taylor Fritz. He lost in the first round at the 2023 French Open but recorded a win at the 2023 Wimbledon Championships over Federico Coria before losing to 21st seed Grigor Dimitrov.

In 2025, Ivashka returned to the ITF Tour after a year of inactivity. He entered the qualifying competition at the 2026 Grand Prix Hassan II in Marrakesh, Morocco but lost in the first round to Nicolai Budkov Kjær.

== Performance timelines ==
Key
W	F	SF	QF	#R	RR	Q#	P#	DNQ	A	Z#	PO	G	S	B	NMS	NTI	P	NH

(W) winner; (F) finalist; (SF) semifinalist; (QF) quarterfinalist; (#R) rounds 4, 3, 2, 1; (RR) round-robin stage; (Q#) qualification round; (P#) preliminary round; (DNQ) did not qualify; (A) absent; (Z#) Davis/Fed Cup Zonal Group (with number indication) or (PO) play-off; (G) gold, (S) silver or (B) bronze Olympic/Paralympic medal; (NMS) not a Masters tournament; (NTI) not a Tier I tournament; (P) postponed; (NH) not held; (SR) strike rate (events won / competed); (W–L) win–loss record.
To avoid confusion and double counting, these charts are updated at the conclusion of a tournament or when the player's participation has ended.

=== Singles ===
Current through the 2023 Italian Open.

Tournament	2016	2017	2018	2019	2020	2021	2022	2023	SR	W–L
Grand Slam tournaments
Australian Open	A	Q1	Q1	2R	1R	1R	A	1R	0 / 4	1–4
French Open	A	Q2	1R	A	Q1	Q1	2R	1R	0 / 3	1–3
Wimbledon	Q1	Q1	Q1	A	NH	4R	A (Note: Russian and Belarusian athletes were banned from competing following the 2022 Russian invasion of Ukraine.)	2R	0 / 2	4–2
US Open	1R	Q1	Q1	1R	A	3R	4R	1R	0 / 5	5–5
Win–loss	0–1	0–0	0–1	1–2	0–1	5–3	4–2	1–4	0 / 14	11–14
ATP Masters 1000
Indian Wells Masters	A	A	A	1R	NH	A	A	3R	0 / 2	2–2
Miami Open	A	A	A	2R	NH	2R	A	2R	0 / 3	3–3
Monte-Carlo Masters	A	A	1R	Q1	NH	A	1R	2R	0 / 3	1–3
Madrid Open	A	A	Q1	A	NH	A	1R	1R	0 / 2	0–2
Italian Open	A	A	A	A	Q2	A	1R	1R	0 / 2	0–2
Canadian Open	A	A	3R	2R	NH	A	A	Q1	0 / 2	3–2
Cincinnati Masters	A	A	A	A	A	Q2	Q2	Q1	0 / 0	0–0
Shanghai Masters	A	A	A	A	NH			A	0 / 0	0–0
Paris Masters	A	A	A	A	A	2R	Q1	A	0 / 1	1–1
Win–loss	0–0	0–0	2–2	2–3	0–0	2–2	0–3	4–5	0 / 15	10–15
National representation
Davis Cup	Z2	PO	Z1	Z1	QR (Note: Edition is split into the two years due to COVID-19.)		A		0 / 0	9–7
Career statistics
	2016	2017	2018	2019	2020	2021	2022	2023	Career	
Tournaments	2	1	13	12	5	18	21	18	89	
Titles	0	0	0	0	0	1	0	0	1	
Finals	0	0	0	0	0	1	0	0	1	
Overall win–loss	5–1	2–2	9–14	8–12	3–5	31–16	22–21	9–18	89–89	
Year-end ranking	179	230	91	131	108	48	73	181	50%	

=== Doubles ===
Current through the 2022 US Open.

Tournament	2018	2019	2020	2021	2022	SR	W–L
Grand Slam tournaments
Australian Open	A	A	A	A	A	0 / 0	0–0
French Open	1R	A	A	A	1R	0 / 2	0–2
Wimbledon	A	A	NH	A	A	0 / 0	0–0
US Open	A	A	A	1R	1R	0 / 2	0–2
Win–loss	0–1	0–0	0–0	0–1	0–2	0 / 4	0–4
National representation
Davis Cup	Z1	Z1	QR		A	0 / 0	0–3
Career statistics
Tournaments	2	1	1	4	3	11	
Overall win–loss	0–2	0–1	0–1	2–4	0–3	2–11	
Year-end ranking	426	0	1018	528	341	15%	

== ATP career finals ==
=== Singles: 1 (1 title) ===
Legend Grand Slam tournaments (0–0) ATP Tour Finals (0–0) ATP Tour Masters 1000 (0–0) ATP Tour 500 Series (0–0) ATP Tour 250 Series (1–0)	Finals by surface Hard (1–0) Clay (0–0) Grass (0–0)	Finals by setting Outdoor (1–0) Indoor (0–0)

Result	W–L	Date	Tournament	Tier	Surface	Opponent	Score
Win	1–0	Aug 2021	Winston-Salem Open, United States	250 Series	Hard	(Sweden) Mikael Ymer	6–0, 6–2

== Davis Cup ==
Legend
Group membership
World Group (0–2)
Group I (5–7)
Group II (5–0)
Group III (0)
Group IV (0)

- ▲ ▼ indicates the outcome of the Davis Cup match followed by the score, date, place of event, the zonal classification and its phase, and the court surface.

Rubber outcome	Rubber	Match type (partner if any)	Opponent nation	Opponent player(s)	Score
▲3–1; 4–6 March 2016; El Gezera Sporting Club, Cairo, Egypt; Group II Europe/Africa first round; clay surface
Victory	II	Singles	Egypt	Mohamed Safwat	5–7, 6–0, 3–6, 7–6^{(7–3)}, 7–5
▲4–1; 15–17 July 2016; National Olympic Training Centre, Minsk, Belarus; Group II Europe/Africa second round; hard surface
Victory	I	Singles	Latvia	Mārtiņš Podžus	6–4, 6–2, 7–5
Victory	IV	Singles	Latvia	Jānis Podžus	6–2, 7–5, 6–0
▲4–1; 16–18 September 2016; National Olympic Training Centre, Minsk, Belarus; Group II Europe/Africa third round; hard surface
Victory	II	Singles	Denmark	Andreas Bjerrehus	6–4, 6–0, 6–0
Victory	IV	Singles	Denmark	Frederik Nielsen	6–4, 4–6, 7–5, 5–7, 6–4
▲3–2; 3–5 February 2017; National Olympic Training Centre, Minsk, Belarus; Group I Europe/Africa first round; hard surface
Defeat	I	Singles	Romania	Adrian Ungur	2–6, 7–5, 5–7, 4–6
Defeat	IV	Singles	Romania	Marius Copil	5–7, 4–6, 1–6
▲3–1; 7–9 April 2017; National Olympic Training Centre, Minsk, Belarus; Group I Europe/Africa second round; hard surface
Victory	II	Singles	Austria	Jürgen Melzer	7–6^{(10–8)}, 6–3, 4–6, 7–6^{(7–1)}
Victory	IV	Singles	Austria	Gerald Melzer	7–6^{(7–3)}, 3–6, 6–3, 6–1
▼0–5; 2–3 February 2018; VAZ St. Polten, Sankt Pölten, Austria; Group I Europe/Africa first round; clay surface
Defeat	I	Singles	Austria	Gerald Melzer	6–2, 5–7, 4–6
Defeat	III	Doubles (with Andrei Vasilevski)	Austria	Oliver Marach Philipp Oswald	3–6, 6–7^{(5–7)}
Defeat	IV	Singles (dead rubber)	Austria	Dominic Thiem	4–6, 6–7^{(5–7)}
▼2–3; 14–15 September 2018; Luzhniki Small Sports Arena, Moscow, Russia; Group I Europe/Africa first round play-offs; hard surface
Victory	II	Singles	Russia	Daniil Medvedev	7–6^{(7–2)}, 6–4
Defeat	IV	Singles	Russia	Karen Khachanov	2–6, 4–6
▲3–2; 13–14 September 2019; National Olympic Training Centre, Minsk, Belarus; Group I Europe/Africa; hard surface
Defeat	I	Singles	Portugal	João Sousa	6–4, 1–6, 2–6
Victory	III	Doubles (with Andrei Vasilevski)	Portugal	João Sousa Pedro Sousa	3–6, 6–7^{(6–8)}
Victory	V	Singles	Portugal	Pedro Sousa	6–4, 7–6^{(7–4)}
▼1–4; 6–7 March 2020; Castello Düsseldorf, Düsseldorf, Germany; Davis Cup qualifying round; hard surface
Defeat	I	Singles	Germany	Jan-Lennard Struff	4–6, 4–6
Defeat	III	Doubles (with Andrei Vasilevski)	Germany	Kevin Krawietz Andreas Mies	4–6, 6–7^{(5–7)}

== ATP Challenger and ITF Tour finals ==
=== Singles: 15 (9 titles, 6 runner–ups) ===
Legend (singles) ATP Challenger Tour (5–4) ITF Futures Tour (4–2)	Titles by surface Hard (9–4) Clay (0–1) Grass (0–0) Carpet (0–1)

Result	W–L	Date	Tournament	Tier	Surface	Opponent	Score
Loss	0–1	Jul 2016	Recanati, Italy	Challenger	Hard	(Ukraine) Illya Marchenko	4–6, 4–6
Win	1–1	Jun 2017	Fergana, Uzbekistan	Challenger	Hard	(Serbia) Nikola Milojević	6–4, 6–3
Win	2–1	Mar 2018	Shenzhen, China	Challenger	Hard	(China) Zhang Ze	6–4, 6–2
Loss	2–2	Jan 2019	Canberra, Australia	Challenger	Hard	(Poland) Hubert Hurkacz	4–6, 6–4, 2–6
Win	3–2	Oct 2020	Istanbul, Turkey	Challenger	Hard	(Slovakia) Martin Kližan	6–1, 6–4
Win	4–2	Nov 2020	Ortisei, Italy	Challenger	Hard (i)	(France) Antoine Hoang	6–4, 3–6, 7–6^{(7–3)}
Loss	4–3	May 2026	Bengaluru, India	Challenger	Clay	Petr Bar Biryukov	6–7^{(0–7)}, 6–4, 4–6
Loss	4–4	Jul 2026	Pozoblanco, Spain	Challenger	Hard	(Luxembourg) Chris Rodesch	4–6, 6–2, 6–7^{(5–7)}
Win	5–4	Sep 2026	Shanghai, China	Challenger	Hard	Marat Sharipov	6–4, 3–6, 7–6^{(9–7)}
Win	1–0	Oct 2013	Kazakhstan F6, Shymkent	Futures	Hard	(Ukraine) Ivan Anikanov	6–3, 7–5
Loss	1–1	Jan 2015	Germany F1, Schwieberdingen	Futures	Carpet (i)	(France) Mick Lescure	6–2, 1–6, 2–6
Loss	1–2	May 2015	Korea F1, Daegu	Futures	Hard	(United States) Daniel Nguyen	6–3, 4–6, 3–6
Win	2–2	Apr 2016	Uzbekistan F1, Karshi	Futures	Hard	(Uzbekistan) Jurabek Karimov	6–3, 1–6, 6–1
Win	3–2	Apr 2016	Uzbekistan F2, Bukhara	Futures	Hard	(Uzbekistan) Temur Ismailov	6–1, 6–1
Win	4–2	Apr 2025	M15 Lu'an, China	WTT	Hard	Egor Agafonov	6–4, 7–5

=== Doubles: 5 (3 titles, 2 runner–ups) ===
Legend (doubles) ATP Challenger Tour (1–0) ITF Futures Tour (2–2)	Titles by surface Hard (3–2) Clay (0–0) Grass (0–0) Carpet (0–0)

Result	W–L	Date	Tournament	Tier	Surface	Partner	Opponents	Score
Win	1–0	Aug 2016	Portorož, Slovenia	Challenger	Hard	(Belarus) Sergey Betov	(Croatia) Tomislav Draganja (Croatia) Nino Serdarušić	1–6, 6–3, [10–4]
Loss	0–1	Apr 2014	China F5, Chengdu	Futures	Hard	(Russia) Victor Baluda	(China) Gong Maoxin (China) Li Zhe	1–0 ret.
Loss	0–2	Jun 2015	Spain F18, Palma del Rio	Futures	Hard	(France) Tom Jomby	(Spain) Jorge Hernando Ruano (Spain) Ricardo Villacorta-Alonso	6–7^{(5–7)}, 5–7
Win	1–2	Aug 2015	Belarus F1, Minsk	Futures	Hard	(Belarus) Egor Gerasimov	(Belarus) Artur Dubinski (Ukraine) Volodymyr Uzhylovskyi	6–3, 6–4
Win	2–2	Aug 2015	Belarus F2, Minsk	Futures	Hard	(Belarus) Egor Gerasimov	(Russia) Daniil Medvedev (China) Zhang Zhizhen	6–1, 6–3

== Wins over top 10 players ==
- He has a 2–16 record against players who were, at the time the match was played, ranked in the top 10.

Season	2021	2022	Total
Wins	1	1	2

#	Player	Rank	Event	Surface	Rd	Score	IIR
2021
1.	(Germany) Alexander Zverev	6	Munich Open, Germany	Clay	QF	6–7^{(5–7)}, 7–5, 6–3	111
2022
2.	(Poland) Hubert Hurkacz	10	US Open, United States	Hard	2R	6–4, 4–6, 7–6^{(7–5)}, 6–3	73

* as of 16 January 2023.

== ITF World Tennis Tour Juniors ==
=== Singles: 1 (0 titles, 1 runner-up) ===
Result	W–L	Date	Tournament	Category	Surface	Opponent	Score
Loss	0–1	Jan 2012	Magnolia Cup, Poland	Category G4	Hard	(Poland) Paweł Ciaś	6–7^{(3–7)}, 2–6

=== Doubles: 2 (1 title, 1 runner-up) ===
Result	W–L	Date	Tournament	Category	Surface	Partner	Opponents	Score
Loss	0–1	Sep 2010	Šiauliai "Mayor's Cup" 2010, Lithuania	Category G5	Clay	(Belarus) Yaroslav Zubko	(Australia) Andrew Harris (Poland) Mikolaj Jedruszczak	3–6, 2–6
Win	1–1	Jan 2012	Magnolia Cup, Poland	Category G4	Hard	(Belarus) Maksim Yorsh	(Poland) Phillip Gresk (Poland) Kamil Majchrzak	7–6^{(7–3)}, 6–2
