= 2013 ITF Men's Circuit (October–December) =

The 2013 ITF Men's Circuit is the 2013 edition of the entry level tour for men's professional tennis, and is the third tier tennis tour below the Association of Tennis Professionals, World Tour and Challenger Tour. It is organised by the International Tennis Federation (ITF) who additionally organizes the ITF Women's Circuit which is an entry-level tour for women's professional tennis. Future tournaments are organized to offer either $10,000 or $15,000 in prize money and tournaments which offering hospitality to players competing in the main draw give additional ranking points which are valid under the ATP ranking system, and are to be organized by a national association or approved by the ITF Men's Circuit Committee.

The tournaments are played on a rectangular flat surface, commonly referred to as a tennis court. The dimensions of a tennis court are defined and regulated by the ITF and the court is 23.78 meters (78.0 feet) long, 10.97 meters (36.0 feet) wide. Its width is 8.23 meters (27.0 feet) for singles matches and 10.97 meters (36.0 feet) for doubles matches. Tennis is played on a variety of surfaces and each surface has its own characteristics which affect the playing style of the game. There are four main types of courts depending on the materials used for the court surface, clay, hard, grass and carpet courts with the ITF classifying five different pace settings ranging from slow to fast.

== Point distribution ==
| Tournament Category | W | F | SF | QF | R16 | R32 |
|---|---|---|---|---|---|---|
| Futures 15,000+H | 35 | 20 | 10 | 4 | 1 | 0 |
| Futures 15,000 | 27 | 15 | 8 | 3 | 1 | 0 |
| Futures 10,000+H | 27 | 15 | 8 | 3 | 1 | 0 |
| Futures 10,000 | 18 | 10 | 6 | 2 | 1 | 0 |

== Key ==
$15,000 tournaments
$10,000 tournaments

== Month ==
=== October ===
| Week of | Tournament | Winner | Runners-up | Semifinalists | Quarterfinalists |
|---|---|---|---|---|---|
| October 7 | Armenia F2 Futures; Yerevan, Armenia; Clay $15,000 | (Austria) Michael Linzer; 7–5, 6–4 | (France) Axel Michon | (Netherlands) Antal van der Duim (Monaco) Benjamin Balleret | (Slovenia) Blaž Rola (France) Mathias Bourgue (Belgium) Yannik Reuter (Ukraine) Marat Deviatiarov |
| October 7 | Armenia F2 Futures; Yerevan, Armenia; Clay $15,000 | (Netherlands) Antal van der Duim (Netherlands) Boy Westerhof; 6–4, 6–4 | (Austria) Michael Linzer (Germany) Marc Meigel | (Netherlands) Antal van der Duim (Monaco) Benjamin Balleret | (Slovenia) Blaž Rola (France) Mathias Bourgue (Belgium) Yannik Reuter (Ukraine) Marat Deviatiarov |
| October 7 | Australia F9 Futures; Sydney, Australia; Hard $15,000 | (Australia) Greg Jones; 3–6, 7–5, 6–1 | (Australia) Jordan Thompson | (Australia) Adam Feeney (Australia) Alex Bolt | (Australia) Blake Mott (Japan) Yasutaka Uchiyama (Australia) Gavin van Peperzeel (New Zealand) Jose Rubin Statham |
| October 7 | Australia F9 Futures; Sydney, Australia; Hard $15,000 | (Australia) Dane Propoggia (New Zealand) Jose Rubin Statham; 4–6, 6–3, [10–3] | (Japan) Kento Takeuchi (Japan) Yasutaka Uchiyama | (Australia) Adam Feeney (Australia) Alex Bolt | (Australia) Blake Mott (Japan) Yasutaka Uchiyama (Australia) Gavin van Peperzeel (New Zealand) Jose Rubin Statham |
| October 7 | France F19 Futures; Saint-Dizier, France; Hard (indoor) $15,000 | (France) Grégoire Burquier; 7–5, 6–1 | (France) Mathieu Rodrigues | (France) Julien Obry (France) Hugo Nys | (France) Julien Demois (France) Jules Marie (United Kingdom) David Rice (France) Jonathan Dasnières de Veigy |
| October 7 | France F19 Futures; Saint-Dizier, France; Hard (indoor) $15,000 | (Belgium) Germain Gigounon (France) Hugo Nys; 7–6^{(7–4)}, 6–4 | (United Kingdom) David Rice (United Kingdom) Sean Thornley | (France) Julien Obry (France) Hugo Nys | (France) Julien Demois (France) Jules Marie (United Kingdom) David Rice (France) Jonathan Dasnières de Veigy |
| October 7 | Hungary F2 Futures; Budapest, Hungary; Clay $15,000 | (Poland) Piotr Gadomski; 6–4, 6–7^{(4–7)}, 6–3 | (Serbia) Filip Krajinović | (Slovakia) Adrian Partl (Germany) Peter Torebko | (Bulgaria) Tihomir Grozdanov (Czech Republic) Marek Michalička (Slovakia) Juraj Masár (Germany) Moritz Baumann |
| October 7 | Hungary F2 Futures; Budapest, Hungary; Clay $15,000 | (Germany) Moritz Baumann (Czech Republic) Marek Michalička; 7-5, 6-3 | (Poland) Piotr Gadomski (Poland) Błażej Koniusz | (Slovakia) Adrian Partl (Germany) Peter Torebko | (Bulgaria) Tihomir Grozdanov (Czech Republic) Marek Michalička (Slovakia) Juraj Masár (Germany) Moritz Baumann |
| October 7 | USA F26 Futures; Houston, United States; Hard $15,000 | (United States) Jeff Dadamo; 6–3, 6–1 | (United States) Evan King | (United Kingdom) Edward Corrie (United States) Tyler Hochwalt | (United Kingdom) Joshua Milton (United States) Jason Jung (Bulgaria) Dimitar Kutrovsky (India) Sanam Singh |
| October 7 | USA F26 Futures; Houston, United States; Hard $15,000 | (India) Vijayant Malik (India) Sanam Singh; 7–6^{(7–5)}, 6–4 | (United States) Evan King (Romania) Costin Pavăl | (United Kingdom) Edward Corrie (United States) Tyler Hochwalt | (United Kingdom) Joshua Milton (United States) Jason Jung (Bulgaria) Dimitar Kutrovsky (India) Sanam Singh |
| October 7 | Bolivia F5 Futures; Santa Cruz, Bolivia; Clay $10,000 | (Bolivia) Hugo Dellien; 6–1, 6–1 | (Japan) Ryusei Makiguchi | (Uruguay) Martín Cuevas (Argentina) Federico Coria | (Colombia) Steffen Zornosa (Ecuador) Gonzalo Escobar (Argentina) Leandro Portmann (Bolivia) Marco-Antonio Rojas |
| October 7 | Bolivia F5 Futures; Santa Cruz, Bolivia; Clay $10,000 | (Argentina) Juan Ignacio Ameal (Uruguay) Martín Cuevas; 3–6, 7–5, [10–7] | (United States) Christopher Racz (Colombia) Steffen Zornosa | (Uruguay) Martín Cuevas (Argentina) Federico Coria | (Colombia) Steffen Zornosa (Ecuador) Gonzalo Escobar (Argentina) Leandro Portmann (Bolivia) Marco-Antonio Rojas |
| October 7 | Brazil F11 Futures; Goiânia, Brazil; Clay $10,000 | (Brazil) Daniel Dutra da Silva; 6–3, 6–4 | (Brazil) Fabrício Neis | (Sweden) Christian Lindell (Brazil) Caio Zampieri | (Brazil) José Pereira (Brazil) Osni Júnior (Brazil) Carlos Eduardo Severino (Brazil) Caio Silva |
| October 7 | Brazil F11 Futures; Goiânia, Brazil; Clay $10,000 | (Brazil) Fabrício Neis (Brazil) Caio Zampieri; 6–3, 7–6^{(7–5)} | (Brazil) Charles Costa (Brazil) Idio Escobar | (Sweden) Christian Lindell (Brazil) Caio Zampieri | (Brazil) José Pereira (Brazil) Osni Júnior (Brazil) Carlos Eduardo Severino (Brazil) Caio Silva |
| October 7 | Chile F6 Futures; Santiago, Chile; Clay $10,000 | (Chile) Juan Carlos Sáez; 6–4, 6–2 | (Argentina) Facundo Mena | (Chile) Jorge Aguilar (Chile) Guillermo Núñez | (Chile) Ricardo Urzúa-Rivera (Chile) Víctor Núñez (Chile) Guillermo Rivera Aránguiz (Chile) Nicolás Jarry |
| October 7 | Chile F6 Futures; Santiago, Chile; Clay $10,000 | (Chile) Juan Carlos Sáez (Chile) Ricardo Urzúa-Rivera; 7–5, 6–2 | (Colombia) Juan Manuel Benítez Chavarriaga (Argentina) Juan Pablo Paz | (Chile) Jorge Aguilar (Chile) Guillermo Núñez | (Chile) Ricardo Urzúa-Rivera (Chile) Víctor Núñez (Chile) Guillermo Rivera Aránguiz (Chile) Nicolás Jarry |
| October 7 | Croatia F10 Futures; Solin, Croatia; Clay $10,000 | (Croatia) Nikola Mektić; 7–6^{(7–5)} 7–6^{(7–2)} | (Croatia) Mate Delić | (Slovenia) Janez Semrajc (Bosnia and Herzegovina) Tomislav Brkić | (Austria) Bastian Trinker (Bosnia and Herzegovina) Nerman Fatić (Russia) Nicolai Soloviev (Austria) Marc Rath |
| October 7 | Croatia F10 Futures; Solin, Croatia; Clay $10,000 | (Bosnia and Herzegovina) Tomislav Brkić (Croatia) Mate Delić; 6–2, 4–6, [10–4] | (Russia) Aleksandre Kondulukov (Russia) Alexey Kondulukov | (Slovenia) Janez Semrajc (Bosnia and Herzegovina) Tomislav Brkić | (Austria) Bastian Trinker (Bosnia and Herzegovina) Nerman Fatić (Russia) Nicolai Soloviev (Austria) Marc Rath |
| October 7 | Egypt F28 Futures; Sharm El Sheikh, Egypt; Clay $10,000 | (Egypt) Sherif Sabry; 1–6, 6–1, 6–4 | (Finland) Micke Kontinen | (Czech Republic) Libor Salaba (Slovakia) Marko Danis | (Egypt) Mohamed Safwat (Ukraine) Vladislav Bondarenko (Egypt) Mazen Osama (Russia) Alexander Zhurbin |
| October 7 | Egypt F28 Futures; Sharm El Sheikh, Egypt; Clay $10,000 | (Tunisia) Skander Mansouri (Colombia) Cristian Rodríguez; 6–3, 6–1 | (Turkey) Tuna Altuna (Russia) Ivan Nedelko | (Czech Republic) Libor Salaba (Slovakia) Marko Danis | (Egypt) Mohamed Safwat (Ukraine) Vladislav Bondarenko (Egypt) Mazen Osama (Russia) Alexander Zhurbin |
| October 7 | Germany F18 Futures; Leimen, Germany; Hard (indoor) $10,000 | (Switzerland) Sandro Ehrat; 6–4, 6–3 | (Italy) Erik Crepaldi | (India) Sriram Balaji (Slovakia) Karol Beck | (Slovakia) Adrian Sikora (United Kingdom) Neil Pauffley (Germany) Jeremy Jahn (Germany) Daniel Masur |
| October 7 | Germany F18 Futures; Leimen, Germany; Hard (indoor) $10,000 | (Germany) Tom Schönenberg (Germany) Lennart Zynga; 6–4, 6–3 | (Austria) Sebastian Bader (Italy) Erik Crepaldi | (India) Sriram Balaji (Slovakia) Karol Beck | (Slovakia) Adrian Sikora (United Kingdom) Neil Pauffley (Germany) Jeremy Jahn (Germany) Daniel Masur |
| October 7 | Great Britain F20 Futures; Sunderland, United Kingdom; Hard (indoor) $10,000 | (United Kingdom) Josh Goodall; 6–3, 6–2 | (United Kingdom) Ashley Hewitt | (New Zealand) Marcus Daniell (South Africa) Tucker Vorster | (India) Vijay Sundar Prashanth (United Kingdom) Tom Allen (United Kingdom) Robert Carter (United Kingdom) Tom Farquharson |
| October 7 | Great Britain F20 Futures; Sunderland, United Kingdom; Hard (indoor) $10,000 | (United Kingdom) Josh Goodall (United Kingdom) Harry Meehan; 6–3, 4–6, [10–8] | (Netherlands) David Pel (India) Vijay Sundar Prashanth | (New Zealand) Marcus Daniell (South Africa) Tucker Vorster | (India) Vijay Sundar Prashanth (United Kingdom) Tom Allen (United Kingdom) Robert Carter (United Kingdom) Tom Farquharson |
| October 7 | Greece F14 Futures; Marathon, Greece; Hard $10,000 | (United Kingdom) Richard Gabb; 7–6^{(7–5)} 6–2 | (Greece) Theodoros Angelinos | (Italy) Claudio Grassi (Italy) Riccardo Ghedin | (Greece) Alexandros Jakupovic (India) Prajnesh Gunneswaran (Brazil) Tiago Fernandes (Serbia) Nikola Milojević |
| October 7 | Greece F14 Futures; Marathon, Greece; Hard $10,000 | (Italy) Riccardo Ghedin (Italy) Claudio Grassi; 6–3, 7–5 | (United Kingdom) Richard Gabb (Germany) Tobias Simon | (Italy) Claudio Grassi (Italy) Riccardo Ghedin | (Greece) Alexandros Jakupovic (India) Prajnesh Gunneswaran (Brazil) Tiago Fernandes (Serbia) Nikola Milojević |
| October 7 | Israel F13 Futures; Acre, Israel; Hard $10,000 | (France) Martin Vaïsse; 7–6^{(7–2)}, 6–2 | (Slovakia) Ivo Klec | (Czech Republic) Michal Schmid (Israel) Bar Tzuf Botzer | (United Kingdom) Joshua Ward-Hibbert (Chinese Taipei) Hung Jui-chen (Israel) Mor Bulis (Israel) Igor Smilansky |
| October 7 | Israel F13 Futures; Acre, Israel; Hard $10,000 | (United Kingdom) Liam Broady (United Kingdom) Joshua Ward-Hibbert; 6–3, 6–0 | (Slovakia) Ivo Klec (Czech Republic) Michal Schmid | (Czech Republic) Michal Schmid (Israel) Bar Tzuf Botzer | (United Kingdom) Joshua Ward-Hibbert (Chinese Taipei) Hung Jui-chen (Israel) Mor Bulis (Israel) Igor Smilansky |
| October 7 | Italy F29 Futures; Palermo, Italy; Clay $10,000 | (Italy) Alessio di Mauro; 6–4, 6–3 | (Italy) Gianluca Naso | (Italy) Alberto Brizzi (Italy) Federico Gaio | (Italy) Matteo Donati (Italy) Walter Trusendi (Italy) Federico Maccari (Italy) Edoardo Eremin |
| October 7 | Italy F29 Futures; Palermo, Italy; Clay $10,000 | (Italy) Walter Trusendi (Italy) Luca Vanni; 6–2, 6–3 | (Italy) Riccardo Bonadio (Italy) Federico Maccari | (Italy) Alberto Brizzi (Italy) Federico Gaio | (Italy) Matteo Donati (Italy) Walter Trusendi (Italy) Federico Maccari (Italy) Edoardo Eremin |
| October 7 | Kazakhstan F6 Futures; Shymkent, Kazakhstan; Hard $10,000 | (Belarus) Ilya Ivashka; 6–3, 7–5 | (Ukraine) Ivan Anikanov | (Belarus) Andrei Vasilevski (Russia) Andrei Plotniy | (India) Karunuday Singh (Georgia (country)) Aleksandre Metreveli (Kyrgyzstan) Daniiar Duldaev (Kazakhstan) Denis Yevseyev |
| October 7 | Kazakhstan F6 Futures; Shymkent, Kazakhstan; Hard $10,000 | (Ukraine) Ivan Anikanov (Russia) Andrei Plotniy; 7–6^{(7–4)}, 7–5 | (Belarus) Vladzimir Kruk (Russia) Yan Sabanin | (Belarus) Andrei Vasilevski (Russia) Andrei Plotniy | (India) Karunuday Singh (Georgia (country)) Aleksandre Metreveli (Kyrgyzstan) Daniiar Duldaev (Kazakhstan) Denis Yevseyev |
| October 7 | Mexico F14 Futures; Pachuca, Mexico; Hard $10,000 | (Guatemala) Christopher Díaz Figueroa; 6–3, 4–6, 6–4 | (Colombia) Felipe Mantilla | (Mexico) Daniel Garza (France) Arthur Surreaux | (Barbados) Darian King (Australia) Chris Letcher (Colombia) Juan Carlos Spir (United States) Carl Eguez |
| October 7 | Mexico F14 Futures; Pachuca, Mexico; Hard $10,000 | (Guatemala) Christopher Díaz Figueroa (Barbados) Darian King; 6–4, 2–6, [10–8] | (South Africa) Dean O'Brien (Colombia) Juan Carlos Spir | (Mexico) Daniel Garza (France) Arthur Surreaux | (Barbados) Darian King (Australia) Chris Letcher (Colombia) Juan Carlos Spir (United States) Carl Eguez |
| October 7 | Peru F1 Futures; Arequipa, Peru; Clay $10,000 | (Peru) Duilio Beretta; 6–1, 7–6^{(8–6)} | (Bolivia) Federico Zeballos | (Argentina) Juan-Pablo Amado (Peru) Mauricio Echazú | (Ecuador) Iván Endara (Australia) Leon Frost (Peru) Jorge Brian Panta (Uruguay) Santiago Maresca |
| October 7 | Peru F1 Futures; Arequipa, Peru; Clay $10,000 | (Peru) Duilio Beretta (Peru) Rodrigo Sánchez; 6–2, 6–4 | (Peru) Mauricio Echazú (Ecuador) Iván Endara | (Argentina) Juan-Pablo Amado (Peru) Mauricio Echazú | (Ecuador) Iván Endara (Australia) Leon Frost (Peru) Jorge Brian Panta (Uruguay) Santiago Maresca |
| October 7 | Portugal F9 Futures; Porto, Portugal; Clay $10,000 | (Japan) Taro Daniel; 6–0, 6–3 | (Spain) Ricardo Ojeda Lara | (Portugal) João Domingues (Portugal) Leonardo Tavares | (France) Michael Bois (Spain) Ricardo Villacorta-Alonso (Spain) Iván Arenas-Gualda (Portugal) Frederico Ferreira Silva |
| October 7 | Portugal F9 Futures; Porto, Portugal; Clay $10,000 | (Spain) Ricardo Ojeda Lara (Venezuela) Ricardo Rodríguez; 4–6, 6–3, [10–8] | (Spain) Iván Arenas-Gualda (Portugal) João Domingues | (Portugal) João Domingues (Portugal) Leonardo Tavares | (France) Michael Bois (Spain) Ricardo Villacorta-Alonso (Spain) Iván Arenas-Gualda (Portugal) Frederico Ferreira Silva |
| October 7 | Spain F34 Futures; Sant Cugat, Spain; Clay $10,000 | (Spain) Roberto Carballés Baena; 6–3, 6–2 | (Spain) Guillermo Olaso | (Spain) Juan Lizariturry (Italy) Filippo Baldi | (Spain) Gerard Granollers (Spain) David Pérez Sanz (Australia) Jason Kubler (Spain) Marc Giner |
| October 7 | Spain F34 Futures; Sant Cugat, Spain; Clay $10,000 | (Spain) Roberto Carballés Baena (Spain) Oriol Roca Batalla; 6–4, 6–2 | (Spain) Marcos Giraldi Requena (Spain) Iván Gómez Mantilla | (Spain) Juan Lizariturry (Italy) Filippo Baldi | (Spain) Gerard Granollers (Spain) David Pérez Sanz (Australia) Jason Kubler (Spain) Marc Giner |
| October 7 | Turkey F40 Futures; Antalya-Kaya-Belek, Turkey; Hard $10,000 | (Croatia) Mate Pavić; 6–4, 6–2 | (Austria) Dennis Novak | (Slovakia) Filip Horanský (United States) Adam El Mihdawy | (Poland) Grzegorz Panfil (Poland) Marcin Gawron (Austria) Pascal Brunner (Czech Republic) Tomáš Papík |
| October 7 | Turkey F40 Futures; Antalya-Kaya-Belek, Turkey; Hard $10,000 | (Poland) Andriej Kapaś (Poland) Grzegorz Panfil; 6–3, 2–6, [10–7] | (Austria) Pascal Brunner (Austria) Dennis Novak | (Slovakia) Filip Horanský (United States) Adam El Mihdawy | (Poland) Grzegorz Panfil (Poland) Marcin Gawron (Austria) Pascal Brunner (Czech Republic) Tomáš Papík |
| October 14 | Australia F10 Futures; Sydney, Australia; Hard $15,000 | (Australia) Luke Saville; 4–6, 6–4, 6–4 | (Japan) Yasutaka Uchiyama | (Japan) Kento Takeuchi (Australia) Jay Andrijic | (India) Yuki Bhambri (Australia) Adam Feeney (New Zealand) Jose Rubin Statham (Australia) Dayne Kelly |
| October 14 | Australia F10 Futures; Sydney, Australia; Hard $15,000 | (Australia) Dane Propoggia (New Zealand) Jose Rubin Statham; 6–4, 6–3 | (India) Yuki Bhambri (Japan) Yasutaka Uchiyama | (Japan) Kento Takeuchi (Australia) Jay Andrijic | (India) Yuki Bhambri (Australia) Adam Feeney (New Zealand) Jose Rubin Statham (Australia) Dayne Kelly |
| October 14 | Croatia F11 Futures; Dubrovnik, Croatia; Clay $15,000 | (Slovenia) Janez Semrajc; 6–4, 5–7, 6–3 | (Slovenia) Blaž Rola | (Slovenia) Nik Razboršek (Romania) Victor Crivoi | (Croatia) Duje Kekez (Slovenia) Mike Urbanija (Croatia) Nikola Mektić (Czech Republic) Marek Michalička |
| October 14 | Croatia F11 Futures; Dubrovnik, Croatia; Clay $15,000 | (Czech Republic) Marek Michalička (Czech Republic) Dominik Süč; 7–6^{(7–2)}, 6–1 | (Bosnia and Herzegovina) Tomislav Brkić (Croatia) Mate Delić | (Slovenia) Nik Razboršek (Romania) Victor Crivoi | (Croatia) Duje Kekez (Slovenia) Mike Urbanija (Croatia) Nikola Mektić (Czech Republic) Marek Michalička |
| October 14 | Nigeria F1 Futures; Lagos, Nigeria; Hard $15,000+H | (Croatia) Borna Ćorić; 6–4, 6–3 | (Croatia) Ante Pavić | (South Africa) Ruan Roelofse (Portugal) André Gaspar Murta | (Japan) Hiroki Kondo (India) Vishnu Vardhan (India) Jeevan Nedunchezhiyan (India) Mithun Murali |
| October 14 | Nigeria F1 Futures; Lagos, Nigeria; Hard $15,000+H | (Croatia) Ante Pavić (South Africa) Ruan Roelofse; 7–6^{(7–3)}, 6–2 | (Croatia) Borna Ćorić (Croatia) Dino Marcan | (South Africa) Ruan Roelofse (Portugal) André Gaspar Murta | (Japan) Hiroki Kondo (India) Vishnu Vardhan (India) Jeevan Nedunchezhiyan (India) Mithun Murali |
| October 14 | USA F27 Futures; Mansfield, United States; Hard $15,000 | (Australia) Andrew Harris; 6–4, 7–6^{(7–5)} | (United States) Dennis Nevolo | (United States) Austin Krajicek (Spain) Arnau Dachs | (United States) Stefan Kozlov (United Kingdom) Joshua Milton (Germany) Jakob Sude (United States) Jeff Dadamo |
| October 14 | USA F27 Futures; Mansfield, United States; Hard $15,000 | (United Kingdom) Edward Corrie (United Kingdom) Daniel Smethurst; 6–3, 7–5 | (United States) Jean-Yves Aubone (United States) Kevin King | (United States) Austin Krajicek (Spain) Arnau Dachs | (United States) Stefan Kozlov (United Kingdom) Joshua Milton (Germany) Jakob Sude (United States) Jeff Dadamo |
| October 14 | Brazil F12 Futures; Montes Claros, Brazil; Clay $10,000 | (Brazil) Marcelo Zormann; 6–3, 6–3 | (Brazil) Caio Silva | (Brazil) Rafael Matos (Brazil) Osni Júnior | (Canada) Steven Diez (Brazil) Filipe Brandão (Brazil) Thales Turini (Brazil) Bruno Sant'Anna |
| October 14 | Brazil F12 Futures; Montes Claros, Brazil; Clay $10,000 | (Brazil) Gabriel Vellinho Hocevar (Brazil) Rafael Matos; 7–5, 7–5 | (Brazil) Luís Britto (Brazil) Marcelo Zormann | (Brazil) Rafael Matos (Brazil) Osni Júnior | (Canada) Steven Diez (Brazil) Filipe Brandão (Brazil) Thales Turini (Brazil) Bruno Sant'Anna |
| October 14 | Egypt F29 Futures; Sharm El Sheikh, Egypt; Clay $10,000 | (Egypt) Mohamed Safwat; 6–4, 6–2 | (Morocco) Hicham Khaddari | (Egypt) Sherif Sabry (Russia) Ivan Nedelko | (Spain) Enrique López Pérez (France) Mathias Bourgue (Italy) Daniele Capecchi (Czech Republic) Libor Salaba |
| October 14 | Egypt F29 Futures; Sharm El Sheikh, Egypt; Clay $10,000 | (Russia) Ivan Gakhov (Spain) Miguel Ángel López Jaén; 6–3, 7–5 | (Poland) Przemysław Filipek (Poland) Rafał Teurer | (Egypt) Sherif Sabry (Russia) Ivan Nedelko | (Spain) Enrique López Pérez (France) Mathias Bourgue (Italy) Daniele Capecchi (Czech Republic) Libor Salaba |
| October 14 | France F20 Futures; Cap d'Agde, France; Hard (indoor) $10,000 | (Latvia) Andis Juška; 7–6^{(7–5)}, 7–6^{(7–4)} | (France) Calvin Hemery | (France) Sadio Doumbia (France) Grégoire Jacq | (France) Eric Fomba (France) Simon Cauvard (France) Julien Obry (France) Yannick Jankovits |
| October 14 | France F20 Futures; Cap d'Agde, France; Hard (indoor) $10,000 | (France) Sébastien Boltz (France) Grégoire Jacq; 6–4, 6–2 | (France) Constantin Belot (France) Maxime Tchoutakian | (France) Sadio Doumbia (France) Grégoire Jacq | (France) Eric Fomba (France) Simon Cauvard (France) Julien Obry (France) Yannick Jankovits |
| October 14 | Germany F19 Futures; Essen, Germany; Hard (indoor) $10,000 | (Slovakia) Adrian Sikora; 6–7^{(5–7)}, 6–4, 6–1 | (Germany) Maximilian Marterer | (Switzerland) Alexander Ritschard (Germany) Lennart Zynga | (Germany) Philipp Scholz (Russia) Philipp Davydenko (Germany) Matthias Wunner (Germany) Tim Nekic |
| October 14 | Germany F19 Futures; Essen, Germany; Hard (indoor) $10,000 | (Germany) Andreas Mies (Germany) Oscar Otte; Walkover | (India) Sriram Balaji (Serbia) Miki Janković | (Switzerland) Alexander Ritschard (Germany) Lennart Zynga | (Germany) Philipp Scholz (Russia) Philipp Davydenko (Germany) Matthias Wunner (Germany) Tim Nekic |
| October 14 | Great Britain F21 Futures; Loughborough, United Kingdom; Hard (indoor) $10,000 | (Lithuania) Laurynas Grigelis; 6–4, 3–6, 6–3 | (United Kingdom) David Rice | (Republic of Ireland) Sam Barry (United Kingdom) George Coupland | (Poland) Piotr Łomacki (Belgium) Joris De Loore (United Kingdom) Robert Carter (France) Nicolas Rosenzweig |
| October 14 | Great Britain F21 Futures; Loughborough, United Kingdom; Hard (indoor) $10,000 | (United Kingdom) David Rice (United Kingdom) Sean Thornley; 6–3, 6–7^{(3–7)}, [10–5] | (Netherlands) Kevin Griekspoor (Netherlands) Scott Griekspoor | (Republic of Ireland) Sam Barry (United Kingdom) George Coupland | (Poland) Piotr Łomacki (Belgium) Joris De Loore (United Kingdom) Robert Carter (France) Nicolas Rosenzweig |
| October 14 | Greece F15 Futures; Heraklion, Greece; Hard $10,000 | (Bulgaria) Dimitar Kuzmanov; 6–1, 6–2 | (Germany) Torsten Wietoska | (Greece) Alexandros Jakupovic (France) Martin Vaïsse | (Switzerland) Loïc Perret (Kuwait) Abdullah Maqdes (Czech Republic) Adam Pavlásek (Serbia) Marko Tepavac |
| October 14 | Greece F15 Futures; Heraklion, Greece; Hard $10,000 | (Serbia) Marko Tepavac (Germany) Torsten Wietoska; 4–6, 6–3, [10–8] | (Greece) Alexandros Jakupovic (France) Martin Vaïsse | (Greece) Alexandros Jakupovic (France) Martin Vaïsse | (Switzerland) Loïc Perret (Kuwait) Abdullah Maqdes (Czech Republic) Adam Pavlásek (Serbia) Marko Tepavac |
| October 14 | Israel F14 Futures; Ramat HaSharon, Israel; Hard $10,000 | (Italy) Roberto Marcora; 7–6^{(7–4)}, 6–4 | (Slovakia) Ivo Klec | (United Kingdom) Liam Broady (Czech Republic) Michal Schmid | (Belgium) Jonas Merckx (United Kingdom) Joshua Ward-Hibbert (Greece) Markos Kalovelonis (Israel) Bar Tzuf Botzer |
| October 14 | Israel F14 Futures; Ramat HaSharon, Israel; Hard $10,000 | (United Kingdom) Luke Bambridge (United Kingdom) Evan Hoyt; 7–6^{(7–5)}, 7–6^{(7–4)} | (United Kingdom) Liam Broady (United Kingdom) Joshua Ward-Hibbert | (United Kingdom) Liam Broady (Czech Republic) Michal Schmid | (Belgium) Jonas Merckx (United Kingdom) Joshua Ward-Hibbert (Greece) Markos Kalovelonis (Israel) Bar Tzuf Botzer |
| October 14 | Italy F30 Futures; Palermo, Italy; Clay $10,000 | (Italy) Alessio di Mauro; 6–3, 6–3 | (Italy) Simone Vagnozzi | (Italy) Salvatore Caruso (Italy) Walter Trusendi | (Italy) Damiano Di Ienno (Italy) Omar Giacalone (Italy) Claudio Fortuna (Italy) Pietro Licciardi |
| October 14 | Italy F30 Futures; Palermo, Italy; Clay $10,000 | (Italy) Marco Bortolotti (Italy) Nicola Ghedin; 7-6^{(7–3)}, 6-7^{(2–7)}, [10–4] | (Italy) Antonio Mastrelia (Italy) Federico Torresi | (Italy) Salvatore Caruso (Italy) Walter Trusendi | (Italy) Damiano Di Ienno (Italy) Omar Giacalone (Italy) Claudio Fortuna (Italy) Pietro Licciardi |
| October 14 | Kazakhstan F7 Futures; Shymkent, Kazakhstan; Hard $10,000 | (Slovakia) Marek Semjan; 6–2, 7–6^{(7–5)} | (Russia) Stanislav Vovk | (Ukraine) Ivan Anikanov (Russia) Mikhail Fufygin | (Russia) Mikhail Vaks (Kazakhstan) Denis Yevseyev (Belarus) Yaraslav Shyla (Uzbekistan) Temur Ismailov |
| October 14 | Kazakhstan F7 Futures; Shymkent, Kazakhstan; Hard $10,000 | (Belarus) Siarhei Betau (Belarus) Aliaksandr Bury; 6–7^{(5–7)}, 6–3, [10–7] | (Slovakia) Marek Semjan (Kazakhstan) Denis Yevseyev | (Ukraine) Ivan Anikanov (Russia) Mikhail Fufygin | (Russia) Mikhail Vaks (Kazakhstan) Denis Yevseyev (Belarus) Yaraslav Shyla (Uzbekistan) Temur Ismailov |
| October 14 | Mexico F15 Futures; Quintana Roo, Mexico; Hard $10,000 | (Mexico) César Ramírez; 6–1, 6–1 | (Colombia) Michael Quintero | (Japan) Yoshihito Nishioka (Venezuela) Luis David Martínez | (Canada) Brayden Schnur (Colombia) Eduardo Struvay (Mexico) Lucas Gómez (Barbados) Darian King |
| October 14 | Mexico F15 Futures; Quintana Roo, Mexico; Hard $10,000 | (Mexico) César Ramírez (Japan) Kaichi Uchida; 7–6^{(7–5)}, 6–4 | (Puerto Rico) Alex Llompart (New Zealand) Finn Tearney | (Japan) Yoshihito Nishioka (Venezuela) Luis David Martínez | (Canada) Brayden Schnur (Colombia) Eduardo Struvay (Mexico) Lucas Gómez (Barbados) Darian King |
| October 14 | Peru F2 Futures; Chosica, Peru; Clay $10,000+H | (Dominican Republic) José Hernández; 2–6, 6–3, 6–3 | (Chile) Jorge Aguilar | (Chile) Cristóbal Saavedra Corvalán (Chile) Ricardo Urzúa-Rivera | (Japan) Ryusei Makiguchi (Uruguay) Martín Cuevas (Ecuador) Iván Endara (Peru) Duilio Beretta |
| October 14 | Peru F2 Futures; Chosica, Peru; Clay $10,000+H | (Peru) Duilio Beretta (Peru) Rodrigo Sánchez; 6–2, 5–7, [10–2] | (Peru) Mauricio Echazú (Chile) Cristóbal Saavedra Corvalán | (Chile) Cristóbal Saavedra Corvalán (Chile) Ricardo Urzúa-Rivera | (Japan) Ryusei Makiguchi (Uruguay) Martín Cuevas (Ecuador) Iván Endara (Peru) Duilio Beretta |
| October 14 | Portugal F10 Futures; Guimarães, Portugal; Hard $10,000 | (Portugal) Rui Machado; 5–7, 6–1, 3–0, retired | (Netherlands) Miliaan Niesten | (Venezuela) Ricardo Rodríguez (Portugal) Leonardo Tavares | (France) Michael Bois (Spain) Iván Arenas-Gualda (Spain) Ricardo Ojeda Lara (Spain) Ricardo Villacorta-Alonso |
| October 14 | Portugal F10 Futures; Guimarães, Portugal; Hard $10,000 | (Portugal) João Domingues (Portugal) Frederico Ferreira Silva; 7–6^{(7–5)}, 1–6, [10–8] | (Portugal) Gonçalo Falcão (Portugal) Gonçalo Pereira | (Venezuela) Ricardo Rodríguez (Portugal) Leonardo Tavares | (France) Michael Bois (Spain) Iván Arenas-Gualda (Spain) Ricardo Ojeda Lara (Spain) Ricardo Villacorta-Alonso |
| October 14 | Spain F35 Futures; El Prat de Llobregat, Spain; Clay $10,000 | (Spain) Juan Lizariturry; 6–3, 6–3 | (Spain) Jordi Samper Montaña | (Algeria) Lamine Ouahab (Spain) Marcos Giraldi Requena | (Russia) Ronald Slobodchikov (Spain) José Checa Calvo (Spain) Guillermo Olaso (Spain) Pol Toledo Bagué |
| October 14 | Spain F35 Futures; El Prat de Llobregat, Spain; Clay $10,000 | (Australia) Jason Kubler (Spain) Pol Toledo Bagué; 6–2, 4–6, [10–6] | (Venezuela) Jordi Muñoz Abreu (Netherlands) Mark Vervoort | (Algeria) Lamine Ouahab (Spain) Marcos Giraldi Requena | (Russia) Ronald Slobodchikov (Spain) José Checa Calvo (Spain) Guillermo Olaso (Spain) Pol Toledo Bagué |
| October 14 | Turkey F41 Futures; Antalya-Kaya-Belek, Turkey; Hard $10,000 | (Czech Republic) Ivo Minář; 6–1, 1–6, 6–3 | (France) Tristan Lamasine | (Poland) Marcin Gawron (Czech Republic) Michal Konečný | (Poland) Grzegorz Panfil (Netherlands) Matwé Middelkoop (Slovakia) Juraj Masár (Ukraine) Vadim Alekseenko |
| October 14 | Turkey F41 Futures; Antalya-Kaya-Belek, Turkey; Hard $10,000 | (Czech Republic) Ivo Minář (Czech Republic) Tomáš Papík; 7–5, 7–6^{(7–4)} | (Poland) Andriej Kapaś (Poland) Grzegorz Panfil | (Poland) Marcin Gawron (Czech Republic) Michal Konečný | (Poland) Grzegorz Panfil (Netherlands) Matwé Middelkoop (Slovakia) Juraj Masár (Ukraine) Vadim Alekseenko |
| October 21 | Brazil F13 Futures; Belém, Brazil; Hard $15,000 | (Brazil) Wilson Leite; 5–7, 6–1, 6–2 | (Brazil) Thales Turini | (Brazil) Augusto Laranja (Brazil) Fernando Romboli | (Colombia) Nicolás Barrientos (Brazil) Daniel Dutra da Silva (Brazil) André Miele (Brazil) João Pedro Sorgi |
| October 21 | Brazil F13 Futures; Belém, Brazil; Hard $15,000 | (Argentina) Pablo Albano (Brazil) Fernando Romboli; 4–6, 6–1, [10–8] | (Brazil) Wilson Leite (Brazil) Victor Maynard | (Brazil) Augusto Laranja (Brazil) Fernando Romboli | (Colombia) Nicolás Barrientos (Brazil) Daniel Dutra da Silva (Brazil) André Miele (Brazil) João Pedro Sorgi |
| October 21 | Croatia F12 Futures; Dubrovnik, Croatia; Clay $15,000 | (Bosnia and Herzegovina) Damir Džumhur; 6–2, 4–6, 6–4 | (Romania) Victor Crivoi | (Croatia) Nikola Mektić (Croatia) Toni Androić | (Germany) Richard Becker (Czech Republic) Marek Michalička (Austria) Bastian Trinker (Serbia) Miljan Zekić |
| October 21 | Croatia F12 Futures; Dubrovnik, Croatia; Clay $15,000 | (Slovenia) Nik Razboršek (Slovenia) Mike Urbanija; 7–6^{(7–3)}, 2–6, [10–8] | (Czech Republic) Marek Michalička (Czech Republic) Dominik Süč | (Croatia) Nikola Mektić (Croatia) Toni Androić | (Germany) Richard Becker (Czech Republic) Marek Michalička (Austria) Bastian Trinker (Serbia) Miljan Zekić |
| October 21 | France F21 Futures; Rodez, France; Hard (indoor) $15,000+H | (Belgium) Maxime Authom; 6–4, 3–6, 6–4 | (France) David Guez | (France) Grégoire Burquier (France) Vincent Millot | (France) Hugo Nys (Belgium) Yannick Mertens (France) Fabrice Martin (France) Antoine Benneteau |
| October 21 | France F21 Futures; Rodez, France; Hard (indoor) $15,000+H | (Germany) Gero Kretschmer (Germany) Alexander Satschko; 6–4, 7–6^{(7–4)} | (France) Antoine Benneteau (France) Fabrice Martin | (France) Grégoire Burquier (France) Vincent Millot | (France) Hugo Nys (Belgium) Yannick Mertens (France) Fabrice Martin (France) Antoine Benneteau |
| October 21 | Nigeria F2 Futures; Lagos, Nigeria; Hard $15,000+H | (Croatia) Ante Pavić; 6–4, 6–3 | (India) Jeevan Nedunchezhiyan | (Japan) Hiroki Kondo (Portugal) André Gaspar Murta | (South Africa) Ruan Roelofse (Croatia) Borna Ćorić (Croatia) Dino Marcan (India) Ranjeet Virali-Murugesan |
| October 21 | Nigeria F2 Futures; Lagos, Nigeria; Hard $15,000+H | (Croatia) Ante Pavić (South Africa) Ruan Roelofse; 7–5, 6–3 | (Croatia) Borna Ćorić (Croatia) Dino Marcan | (Japan) Hiroki Kondo (Portugal) André Gaspar Murta | (South Africa) Ruan Roelofse (Croatia) Borna Ćorić (Croatia) Dino Marcan (India) Ranjeet Virali-Murugesan |
| October 21 | Egypt F30 Futures; Sharm El Sheikh, Egypt; Clay $10,000 | (France) Axel Michon; 6–3, 6–4 | (Spain) Enrique López Pérez | (Italy) Francesco Picco (Morocco) Hicham Khaddari | (Egypt) Mazen Osama (Finland) Henrik Sillanpää (Austria) Thomas Statzberger (Italy) Alessandro Petrone |
| October 21 | Egypt F30 Futures; Sharm El Sheikh, Egypt; Clay $10,000 | (Netherlands) Romano Frantzen (Spain) Enrique López Pérez; 6–4, 7–6^{(7–4)} | (Russia) Ivan Gakhov (Spain) Miguel Ángel López Jaén | (Italy) Francesco Picco (Morocco) Hicham Khaddari | (Egypt) Mazen Osama (Finland) Henrik Sillanpää (Austria) Thomas Statzberger (Italy) Alessandro Petrone |
| October 21 | Germany F20 Futures; Bad Salzdetfurth, Germany; Carpet (indoor) $10,000 | (Germany) Tim Nekic; 6–1, 6–2 | (Germany) Stefan Seifert | (Germany) Tom Schönenberg (Germany) Matthias Wunner | (Germany) Christian Hirschmüller (Germany) Dominik Schulz (Germany) Oscar Otte (North Macedonia) Dimitar Grabul |
| October 21 | Germany F20 Futures; Bad Salzdetfurth, Germany; Carpet (indoor) $10,000 | (Germany) Andreas Mies (Germany) Oscar Otte; 5–7, 6–3, [10–8] | (Germany) Daniel Masur (Germany) Dominik Schulz | (Germany) Tom Schönenberg (Germany) Matthias Wunner | (Germany) Christian Hirschmüller (Germany) Dominik Schulz (Germany) Oscar Otte (North Macedonia) Dimitar Grabul |
| October 21 | Great Britain F22 Futures; Tipton, United Kingdom; Hard (indoor) $10,000 | (Lithuania) Laurynas Grigelis; 6–3, 6–3 | (Belgium) Joris De Loore | (United Kingdom) James Marsalek (Netherlands) Kevin Griekspoor | (United Kingdom) George Morgan (Republic of Ireland) Sam Barry (Switzerland) Adrien Bossel (United Kingdom) Keelan Oakley |
| October 21 | Great Britain F22 Futures; Tipton, United Kingdom; Hard (indoor) $10,000 | (United Kingdom) Lewis Burton (United Kingdom) Marcus Willis; 7–6^{(7–0)}, 6–2 | (United Kingdom) Graeme Dyce (United Kingdom) Calum Gee | (United Kingdom) James Marsalek (Netherlands) Kevin Griekspoor | (United Kingdom) George Morgan (Republic of Ireland) Sam Barry (Switzerland) Adrien Bossel (United Kingdom) Keelan Oakley |
| October 21 | Greece F16 Futures; Heraklion, Greece; Hard $10,000 | (France) Martin Vaïsse; 6–4, 6–1 | (Kuwait) Abdullah Maqdes | (Romania) Petru-Alexandru Luncanu (Belgium) Arthur De Greef | (Italy) Alessandro Bega (Greece) Alexandros Jakupovic (Czech Republic) Adam Pavlásek (Greece) Charalampos Kapogiannis |
| October 21 | Greece F16 Futures; Heraklion, Greece; Hard $10,000 | (Slovenia) Tom Kočevar-Dešman (Germany) Torsten Wietoska; 6–3, 4–6, [10–3] | (Czech Republic) Roman Jebavý (Czech Republic) Václav Šafránek | (Romania) Petru-Alexandru Luncanu (Belgium) Arthur De Greef | (Italy) Alessandro Bega (Greece) Alexandros Jakupovic (Czech Republic) Adam Pavlásek (Greece) Charalampos Kapogiannis |
| October 21 | Israel F15 Futures; Herzliya, Israel; Hard $10,000 | (Italy) Claudio Fortuna; 1–6, 6–1, 7–5 | (United Kingdom) Liam Broady | (United Kingdom) Toby Martin (Slovakia) Ivo Klec | (United Kingdom) Luke Bambridge (Serbia) Laslo Djere (Belgium) Jonas Merckx (Israel) Bar Tzuf Botzer |
| October 21 | Israel F15 Futures; Herzliya, Israel; Hard $10,000 | (United Kingdom) Scott Clayton (United Kingdom) Toby Martin; 6–4, 6–0 | (Israel) Mor Bulis (Israel) Edan Leshem | (United Kingdom) Toby Martin (Slovakia) Ivo Klec | (United Kingdom) Luke Bambridge (Serbia) Laslo Djere (Belgium) Jonas Merckx (Israel) Bar Tzuf Botzer |
| October 21 | Kazakhstan F8 Futures; Shymkent, Kazakhstan; Hard $10,000 | (Russia) Stanislav Vovk; 6–0, 6–1 | (Kyrgyzstan) Daniiar Duldaev | (Russia) Mikhail Fufygin (Belarus) Yaraslav Shyla | (Belarus) Vladzimir Kruk (Belarus) Siarhei Betau (Russia) Anton Galkin (Ukraine) Stanislav Poplavskyy |
| October 21 | Kazakhstan F8 Futures; Shymkent, Kazakhstan; Hard $10,000 | (Belarus) Siarhei Betau (Belarus) Aliaksandr Bury; 5–7, 6–2, [10–3] | (Belarus) Vladzimir Kruk (Belarus) Yaraslav Shyla | (Russia) Mikhail Fufygin (Belarus) Yaraslav Shyla | (Belarus) Vladzimir Kruk (Belarus) Siarhei Betau (Russia) Anton Galkin (Ukraine) Stanislav Poplavskyy |
| October 21 | Mexico F16 Futures; Quintana Roo, Mexico; Hard $10,000 | (Venezuela) David Souto; 4–6, 6–4, 6–1 | (Barbados) Darian King | (Colombia) Michael Quintero (United States) Kyle McMorrow | (Mexico) Daniel Garza (Mexico) Mauricio Astorga (Venezuela) Luis David Martínez (Mexico) César Ramírez |
| October 21 | Mexico F16 Futures; Quintana Roo, Mexico; Hard $10,000 | (Venezuela) Luis David Martínez (Venezuela) Roberto Maytín; 6–3, 6–4 | (Puerto Rico) Alex Llompart (New Zealand) Finn Tearney | (Colombia) Michael Quintero (United States) Kyle McMorrow | (Mexico) Daniel Garza (Mexico) Mauricio Astorga (Venezuela) Luis David Martínez (Mexico) César Ramírez |
| October 21 | Peru F3 Futures; Chosica, Peru; Clay $10,000 | (Argentina) Juan Ignacio Londero; 6–7^{(8–10)}, 6–2, 6–2 | (Chile) Ricardo Urzúa-Rivera | (Chile) Cristóbal Saavedra Corvalán (Peru) Mauricio Echazú | (Chile) Jorge Aguilar (Argentina) Mariano Urli (Argentina) Gaston Paz (Peru) Juan Pablo Varillas |
| October 21 | Peru F3 Futures; Chosica, Peru; Clay $10,000 | (Chile) Jorge Aguilar (Chile) Ricardo Urzúa-Rivera; 7–5, 4–6, [10–2] | (Peru) Mauricio Echazú (Chile) Cristóbal Saavedra Corvalán | (Chile) Cristóbal Saavedra Corvalán (Peru) Mauricio Echazú | (Chile) Jorge Aguilar (Argentina) Mariano Urli (Argentina) Gaston Paz (Peru) Juan Pablo Varillas |
| October 21 | Portugal F11 Futures; Guimarães, Portugal; Hard $10,000 | (Portugal) Rui Machado; 7–6^{(7–4)}, 6–3 | (Belgium) Niels Desein | (Spain) Carlos Boluda-Purkiss (France) Jules Marie | (Spain) Ricardo Villacorta-Alonso (Spain) Jaime Pulgar-García (Spain) Roberto Ortega Olmedo (Portugal) João Domingues |
| October 21 | Portugal F11 Futures; Guimarães, Portugal; Hard $10,000 | (Spain) Carlos Boluda-Purkiss (Spain) Roberto Ortega Olmedo; 6–3, 6–4 | (Spain) Adam Sanjurjo Hermida (Spain) Miguel Semmler | (Spain) Carlos Boluda-Purkiss (France) Jules Marie | (Spain) Ricardo Villacorta-Alonso (Spain) Jaime Pulgar-García (Spain) Roberto Ortega Olmedo (Portugal) João Domingues |
| October 21 | Spain F36 Futures; El Prat de Llobregat, Spain; Clay $10,000 | (France) Tak Khunn Wang; 4–6, 6–2, 6–3 | (Algeria) Lamine Ouahab | (Spain) Jordi Samper Montaña (Australia) Jason Kubler | (Portugal) Gonçalo Oliveira (Spain) Carles Poch Gradin (Spain) Roberto Carballés Baena (Spain) Gerard Granollers |
| October 21 | Spain F36 Futures; El Prat de Llobregat, Spain; Clay $10,000 | (Italy) Antonio Campo (Italy) Omar Giacalone; 3–6, 6–4, [10–6] | (Spain) David Pérez Sanz (India) Ramkumar Ramanathan | (Spain) Jordi Samper Montaña (Australia) Jason Kubler | (Portugal) Gonçalo Oliveira (Spain) Carles Poch Gradin (Spain) Roberto Carballés Baena (Spain) Gerard Granollers |
| October 21 | Turkey F42 Futures; Antalya-Kaya-Belek, Turkey; Hard $10,000 | (United States) Adam El Mihdawy; 2–1, retired | (Netherlands) Matwé Middelkoop | (Czech Republic) Michal Konečný (Czech Republic) Ivo Minář | (United States) William Boe-Wiegaard (Romania) Andrei Ștefan Apostol (Switzerland) Luca Margaroli (France) Tristan Lamasine |
| October 21 | Turkey F42 Futures; Antalya-Kaya-Belek, Turkey; Hard $10,000 | (Slovakia) Filip Horanský (Netherlands) Matwé Middelkoop; 6–4, 6–3 | (Ukraine) Danylo Kalenichenko (Slovakia) Adrian Partl | (Czech Republic) Michal Konečný (Czech Republic) Ivo Minář | (United States) William Boe-Wiegaard (Romania) Andrei Ștefan Apostol (Switzerland) Luca Margaroli (France) Tristan Lamasine |
| October 21 | USA F28 Futures; Birmingham, United States; Clay $10,000 | (France) Romain Arneodo; 6–4, 1–6, 6–0 | (Chile) Hans Podlipnik Castillo | (Germany) Alexander Zverev (Monaco) Benjamin Balleret | (United States) Chase Buchanan (Romania) Cătălin-Ionuț Gârd (Estonia) Daniil Proskura (United States) Evan King |
| October 21 | USA F28 Futures; Birmingham, United States; Clay $10,000 | (France) Romain Arneodo (Monaco) Benjamin Balleret; 6–7^{(4–7)}, 6–4, [10–7] | (United States) Sekou Bangoura (United States) Evan King | (Germany) Alexander Zverev (Monaco) Benjamin Balleret | (United States) Chase Buchanan (Romania) Cătălin-Ionuț Gârd (Estonia) Daniil Proskura (United States) Evan King |
| October 28 | Brazil F14 Futures; Porto Alegre, Brazil; Clay $10,000 | (Brazil) Wilson Leite; 2–6, 6–2, 6–4 | (Brazil) Caio Zampieri | (Brazil) Thales Turini (Brazil) Rafael Camilo | (Argentina) Facundo Mena (Brazil) Filipe Brandão (Brazil) Caio Silva (Brazil) João Pedro Sorgi |
| October 28 | Brazil F14 Futures; Porto Alegre, Brazil; Clay $10,000 | (Brazil) Fabrício Neis (Brazil) Caio Zampieri; 6–0, 6–1 | (Brazil) Oscar José Gutierrez (Brazil) Osni Júnior | (Brazil) Thales Turini (Brazil) Rafael Camilo | (Argentina) Facundo Mena (Brazil) Filipe Brandão (Brazil) Caio Silva (Brazil) João Pedro Sorgi |
| October 28 | Croatia F13 Futures; Umag, Croatia; Clay $10,000 | (Slovenia) Janez Semrajc; 6–4, 6–2 | (Croatia) Duje Kekez | (Croatia) Toni Androić (Croatia) Luka Zaninović | (Austria) Patrick Ofner (Slovenia) Mike Urbanija (Switzerland) Jens Hauser (Croatia) Franjo Raspudić |
| October 28 | Croatia F13 Futures; Umag, Croatia; Clay $10,000 | (Croatia) Antonio Šančić (Slovenia) Janez Semrajc; 3–6, 6–3, [10–5] | (Croatia) Toni Androić (Croatia) Tomislav Draganja | (Croatia) Toni Androić (Croatia) Luka Zaninović | (Austria) Patrick Ofner (Slovenia) Mike Urbanija (Switzerland) Jens Hauser (Croatia) Franjo Raspudić |
| October 28 | Egypt F31 Futures; Sharm El Sheikh, Egypt; Clay $10,000 | (France) Axel Michon; 6–3, 6–1 | (France) Maxime Hamou | (Austria) Bastian Trinker (France) Alexandre Favrot | (Serbia) Nikola Milojević (Italy) Francesco Picco (Poland) Dariusz Lipka (Egypt) Karim Hossam |
| October 28 | Egypt F31 Futures; Sharm El Sheikh, Egypt; Clay $10,000 | (Germany) Steven Moneke (Austria) Thomas Statzberger; 6–4, 3–6, [10–3] | (Austria) Bastian Trinker (France) François-Arthur Vibert | (Austria) Bastian Trinker (France) Alexandre Favrot | (Serbia) Nikola Milojević (Italy) Francesco Picco (Poland) Dariusz Lipka (Egypt) Karim Hossam |
| October 28 | Great Britain F23 Futures; Edgbaston, United Kingdom; Hard (indoor) $10,000 | (Lithuania) Laurynas Grigelis; 6–3, 1–6, 6–0 | (Belgium) Joris De Loore | (Italy) Erik Crepaldi (United Kingdom) James Marsalek | (United Kingdom) Andrew Fitzpatrick (Sweden) Patrik Rosenholm (Slovakia) Pavol Červenák (United Kingdom) Tom Farquharson |
| October 28 | Great Britain F23 Futures; Edgbaston, United Kingdom; Hard (indoor) $10,000 | (United Kingdom) Luke Bambridge (United Kingdom) George Morgan; 7–5, 4–6, [10–7] | (United Kingdom) Scott Clayton (United Kingdom) Jonny O'Mara | (Italy) Erik Crepaldi (United Kingdom) James Marsalek | (United Kingdom) Andrew Fitzpatrick (Sweden) Patrik Rosenholm (Slovakia) Pavol Červenák (United Kingdom) Tom Farquharson |
| October 28 | Greece F17 Futures; Heraklion, Greece; Hard $10,000 | (Austria) Dennis Novak; 6–4, 6–2 | (Italy) Federico Gaio | (France) Laurent Malouli (Serbia) Miki Janković | (Romania) Petru-Alexandru Luncanu (Slovenia) Tom Kočevar-Dešman (Czech Republic) Václav Šafránek (Czech Republic) Roman Jebavý |
| October 28 | Greece F17 Futures; Heraklion, Greece; Hard $10,000 | (Serbia) Miki Janković (Slovenia) Tom Kočevar-Dešman; 6–4, 6–0 | (France) Paul Cayre (France) Fabien Reboul | (France) Laurent Malouli (Serbia) Miki Janković | (Romania) Petru-Alexandru Luncanu (Slovenia) Tom Kočevar-Dešman (Czech Republic) Václav Šafránek (Czech Republic) Roman Jebavý |
| October 28 | Mexico F17 Futures; Quintana Roo, Mexico; Hard $10,000 | (Colombia) Michael Quintero; 7–5, 0–6, 6–2 | (Barbados) Darian King | (Guatemala) Christopher Díaz Figueroa (Mexico) Mauricio Astorga | (Chile) Matías Sborowitz (Venezuela) Luis David Martínez (Puerto Rico) Alex Llompart (New Zealand) Finn Tearney |
| October 28 | Mexico F17 Futures; Quintana Roo, Mexico; Hard $10,000 | (Canada) Hugo Di Feo (Canada) Brayden Schnur; 6–4, 5–7, [10–8] | (Puerto Rico) Alex Llompart (New Zealand) Finn Tearney | (Guatemala) Christopher Díaz Figueroa (Mexico) Mauricio Astorga | (Chile) Matías Sborowitz (Venezuela) Luis David Martínez (Puerto Rico) Alex Llompart (New Zealand) Finn Tearney |
| October 28 | Spain F37 Futures; Madrid, Spain; Clay (indoor) $10,000 | (Australia) Jason Kubler; 7–6^{(7–5)}, 6–0 | (Germany) Jean-Marc Werner | (Spain) Albert Alcaraz Ivorra (Venezuela) Jordi Muñoz Abreu | (Spain) Ricardo Villacorta-Alonso (Czech Republic) Michal Schmid (Spain) David Vega Hernández (United Kingdom) Matthew Short |
| October 28 | Spain F37 Futures; Madrid, Spain; Clay (indoor) $10,000 | (Spain) Iván Arenas-Gualda (Spain) Jaime Pulgar-García; 6–3, 6–1 | (Italy) Ferdinando Bonuccelli (Italy) Davide Melchiorre | (Spain) Albert Alcaraz Ivorra (Venezuela) Jordi Muñoz Abreu | (Spain) Ricardo Villacorta-Alonso (Czech Republic) Michal Schmid (Spain) David Vega Hernández (United Kingdom) Matthew Short |
| October 28 | Turkey F43 Futures; Antalya-Kaya-Belek, Turkey; Hard $10,000 | (Moldova) Maxim Dubarenco; 4–1, retired | (Moldova) Andrei Ciumac | (Belgium) Maxime Authom (Thailand) Wishaya Trongcharoenchaikul | (Slovakia) Adrian Partl (Turkey) Tuna Altuna (Turkey) Cem İlkel (Lithuania) Lukas Mugevičius |
| October 28 | Turkey F43 Futures; Antalya-Kaya-Belek, Turkey; Hard $10,000 | (Moldova) Andrei Ciumac (Ukraine) Artem Smirnov; 6–3, 7–6^{(7–0)} | (Denmark) Anders Arenfeldt (Denmark) Mohamed Shabib | (Belgium) Maxime Authom (Thailand) Wishaya Trongcharoenchaikul | (Slovakia) Adrian Partl (Turkey) Tuna Altuna (Turkey) Cem İlkel (Lithuania) Lukas Mugevičius |
| October 28 | USA F29 Futures; Pensacola, United States; Clay $10,000 | (Monaco) Benjamin Balleret; 6–3, 7–6^{(7–1)} | (France) Éric Prodon | (United States) Jean-Yves Aubone (Romania) Cătălin-Ionuț Gârd | (Chile) Hans Podlipnik Castillo (United States) Sekou Bangoura (Germany) Alexander Zverev (Latvia) Mārtiņš Podžus |
| October 28 | USA F29 Futures; Pensacola, United States; Clay $10,000 | (Trinidad and Tobago) Joseph Cadogan (United States) Patrick Daciek; 6–3, 2–6, [10–3] | (United States) Sekou Bangoura (United States) Devin McCarthy | (United States) Jean-Yves Aubone (Romania) Cătălin-Ionuț Gârd | (Chile) Hans Podlipnik Castillo (United States) Sekou Bangoura (Germany) Alexander Zverev (Latvia) Mārtiņš Podžus |

=== November ===
| Week of | Tournament | Winner | Runners-up | Semifinalists | Quarterfinalists |
|---|---|---|---|---|---|
| November 4 | Brazil F16 Futures; Itajubá, Brazil; Clay $10,000 | (Brazil) Ricardo Hocevar; 6–3, 6–1 | (Brazil) Wilson Leite | (Brazil) André Miele (Brazil) Caio Zampieri | (Brazil) Alexandre Tsuchiya (Brazil) Eduardo Dischinger (Brazil) Caio Silva (Brazil) Thales Turini |
| November 4 | Brazil F16 Futures; Itajubá, Brazil; Clay $10,000 | (Brazil) Pedro Sakamoto (Brazil) Alexandre Tsuchiya; 7–5, 6–7^{(1–7)}, [10–8] | (Brazil) Gustavo Guerses (Argentina) Facundo Mena | (Brazil) André Miele (Brazil) Caio Zampieri | (Brazil) Alexandre Tsuchiya (Brazil) Eduardo Dischinger (Brazil) Caio Silva (Brazil) Thales Turini |
| November 4 | Croatia F14 Futures; Umag, Croatia; Clay $10,000 | (Slovenia) Nik Razboršek; 4–6, 6–2, 6–1 | (Croatia) Toni Androić | (Italy) Luca Vanni (Slovenia) Janez Semrajc | (Slovenia) Blaž Bizjak (Slovenia) Tomislav Ternar (Austria) Patrick Ofner (Austria) Nikolaus Moser |
| November 4 | Croatia F14 Futures; Umag, Croatia; Clay $10,000 | (Croatia) Dino Marcan (Croatia) Antonio Šančić; 6–0, 5–7, [10–2] | (Croatia) Ivan Sabanov (Croatia) Matej Sabanov | (Italy) Luca Vanni (Slovenia) Janez Semrajc | (Slovenia) Blaž Bizjak (Slovenia) Tomislav Ternar (Austria) Patrick Ofner (Austria) Nikolaus Moser |
| November 4 | Egypt F32 Futures; Sharm El Sheikh, Egypt; Clay $10,000 | (Egypt) Mohamed Safwat; 6–3, 7–5 | (France) Axel Michon | (Egypt) Mazen Osama (Portugal) Frederico Ferreira Silva | (Spain) Marc Giner (Germany) Steven Moneke (Germany) Jean-Marc Werner (Russia) Ivan Nedelko |
| November 4 | Egypt F32 Futures; Sharm El Sheikh, Egypt; Clay $10,000 | (Belgium) Romain Barbosa (Portugal) Frederico Ferreira Silva; 6–3, 6–3 | (Russia) Yan Sabanin (Moldova) Andrei Soltoianu | (Egypt) Mazen Osama (Portugal) Frederico Ferreira Silva | (Spain) Marc Giner (Germany) Steven Moneke (Germany) Jean-Marc Werner (Russia) Ivan Nedelko |
| November 4 | Greece F18 Futures; Heraklion, Greece; Hard $10,000 | (France) Johan Sébastien Tatlot; 5–7, 6–4, 7–6^{(7–5)} | (Switzerland) Yann Marti | (Russia) Evgeny Karlovskiy (United Kingdom) Oliver Golding | (Germany) Andreas Mies (United Kingdom) Luke Bambridge (Switzerland) Adrien Bossel (Bulgaria) Dimitar Kuzmanov |
| November 4 | Greece F18 Futures; Heraklion, Greece; Hard $10,000 | (Serbia) Marko Djokovic (Spain) Carlos Gómez-Herrera; 6–1, 6–7^{(3–7)}, [13–11] | (United Kingdom) Luke Bambridge (United Kingdom) Oliver Golding | (Russia) Evgeny Karlovskiy (United Kingdom) Oliver Golding | (Germany) Andreas Mies (United Kingdom) Luke Bambridge (Switzerland) Adrien Bossel (Bulgaria) Dimitar Kuzmanov |
| November 4 | Mexico F18 Futures; Mérida, Mexico; Hard $10,000 | (Mexico) Tigre Hank; 6–3, 6–7^{(2–7)}, 7–6^{(7–2)} | (Puerto Rico) Alex Llompart | (Brazil) Henrique Cunha (El Salvador) Marcelo Arévalo | (Mexico) Miguel Gallardo Valles (France) Antoine Benneteau (Venezuela) Luis David Martínez (Barbados) Darian King |
| November 4 | Mexico F18 Futures; Mérida, Mexico; Hard $10,000 | (United States) Oscar Fabian Matthews (United States) Kyle McMorrow; 6–1, 7–5 | (Venezuela) Luis David Martínez (Venezuela) Roberto Maytín | (Brazil) Henrique Cunha (El Salvador) Marcelo Arévalo | (Mexico) Miguel Gallardo Valles (France) Antoine Benneteau (Venezuela) Luis David Martínez (Barbados) Darian King |
| November 4 | Spain F38 Futures; Puerto de la Cruz, Spain; Carpet $10,000 | (Belgium) Yannick Mertens; 6–2, 6–3 | (Spain) Roberto Ortega Olmedo | (Spain) Iván Arenas-Gualda (Spain) José Checa Calvo | (Spain) Roberto Carballés Baena (Spain) Ricardo Ojeda Lara (Spain) David Vega Hernández (Czech Republic) Michal Schmid |
| November 4 | Spain F38 Futures; Puerto de la Cruz, Spain; Carpet $10,000 | (Spain) José Checa Calvo (Spain) Roberto Ortega Olmedo; 7–6^{(7–5)}, 6–4 | (Spain) Jaume Pla Malfeito (United States) Dennis Uspensky | (Spain) Iván Arenas-Gualda (Spain) José Checa Calvo | (Spain) Roberto Carballés Baena (Spain) Ricardo Ojeda Lara (Spain) David Vega Hernández (Czech Republic) Michal Schmid |
| November 4 | Turkey F44 Futures; Antalya-Kaya-Belek, Turkey; Hard $10,000 | (Germany) Robin Kern; 4–6, 6–3, 6–3 | (Georgia (country)) Nikoloz Basilashvili | (Belgium) Maxime Authom (Moldova) Maxim Dubarenco | (Belgium) Jonas Merckx (Lithuania) Lukas Mugevičius (United States) Adam El Mihdawy (Germany) Maximilian Dinslaken |
| November 4 | Turkey F44 Futures; Antalya-Kaya-Belek, Turkey; Hard $10,000 | (Germany) Pirmin Hänle (Germany) Robin Kern; 6–1, 6–4 | (Netherlands) Kevin Griekspoor (Netherlands) Scott Griekspoor | (Belgium) Maxime Authom (Moldova) Maxim Dubarenco | (Belgium) Jonas Merckx (Lithuania) Lukas Mugevičius (United States) Adam El Mihdawy (Germany) Maximilian Dinslaken |
| November 4 | USA F30 Futures; Niceville, United States; Clay $10,000 | (United States) Sekou Bangoura; 7–6^{(11–9)}, retired | (France) Éric Prodon | (Ecuador) Gonzalo Escobar (Monaco) Romain Arneodo | (Romania) Cătălin-Ionuț Gârd (United States) Stefan Kozlov (Hungary) Péter Nagy (United States) Jean-Yves Aubone |
| November 4 | USA F30 Futures; Niceville, United States; Clay $10,000 | (France) Alexis Musialek (France) Arthur Surreaux; 7–6^{(7–5)}, 6–4 | (South Africa) Damon Gooch (Sweden) Lucas Renard | (Ecuador) Gonzalo Escobar (Monaco) Romain Arneodo | (Romania) Cătălin-Ionuț Gârd (United States) Stefan Kozlov (Hungary) Péter Nagy (United States) Jean-Yves Aubone |
| November 11 | Colombia F6 Futures; Popayán, Colombia; Hard $15,000 | (Greece) Theodoros Angelinos; 7-6^{(7–5)}, 7–6^{(7–4)} | (Venezuela) Luis David Martínez | (Colombia) Juan Carlos Spir (South Africa) Dean O'Brien | (Germany) Jonas Lütjen (Colombia) Eduardo Struvay (Colombia) Juan Manuel Benítez Chavarriaga (United States) Evan Song |
| November 11 | Colombia F6 Futures; Popayán, Colombia; Hard $15,000 | (South Africa) Dean O'Brien (Colombia) Juan Carlos Spir; 6–4, 6–0 | (Germany) Jonas Lütjen (Colombia) Steffen Zornosa | (Colombia) Juan Carlos Spir (South Africa) Dean O'Brien | (Germany) Jonas Lütjen (Colombia) Eduardo Struvay (Colombia) Juan Manuel Benítez Chavarriaga (United States) Evan Song |
| November 11 | Chile F7 Futures; Concepción, Chile; Clay $10,000 | (Argentina) Tomás Lipovšek Puches; 6–2, 6–3 | (Argentina) Eduardo Agustín Torre | (Chile) Juan Carlos Sáez (Chile) Ricardo Urzúa-Rivera | (Argentina) Dante Gennaro (Argentina) Valentín Florez (Argentina) Sebastian Exequiel Pini (Chile) Bastián Malla |
| November 11 | Chile F7 Futures; Concepción, Chile; Clay $10,000 | (Chile) Juan Carlos Sáez (Chile) Ricardo Urzúa-Rivera; 6–1, 6–3 | (Chile) David Fleming (Chile) Víctor Núñez | (Chile) Juan Carlos Sáez (Chile) Ricardo Urzúa-Rivera | (Argentina) Dante Gennaro (Argentina) Valentín Florez (Argentina) Sebastian Exequiel Pini (Chile) Bastián Malla |
| November 11 | Croatia F15 Futures; Bol, Croatia; Clay $10,000 | (Croatia) Toni Androić; 6–2, 6–0 | (Germany) Ivo Mijic | (Slovakia) Jozef Kovalík (Italy) Salvatore Caruso | (Slovenia) Mike Urbanija (Croatia) Dino Marcan (Bosnia and Herzegovina) Tomislav Brkić (Slovenia) Nik Razboršek |
| November 11 | Croatia F15 Futures; Bol, Croatia; Clay $10,000 | (Slovenia) Nik Razboršek (Slovenia) Mike Urbanija; 6–4, 6–2 | (Croatia) Stjepan Cagalj (Croatia) Franjo Raspudić | (Slovakia) Jozef Kovalík (Italy) Salvatore Caruso | (Slovenia) Mike Urbanija (Croatia) Dino Marcan (Bosnia and Herzegovina) Tomislav Brkić (Slovenia) Nik Razboršek |
| November 11 | Cyprus F1 Futures; Nicosia, Cyprus; Clay $10,000 | (Austria) Bastian Trinker; 6–2, 6–3 | (Serbia) Laslo Djere | (Republic of Ireland) Sam Barry (Italy) Francesco Picco | (Italy) Marco Bortolotti (Germany) Peter Heller (Portugal) André Gaspar Murta (Republic of Ireland) Daniel Glancy |
| November 11 | Cyprus F1 Futures; Nicosia, Cyprus; Clay $10,000 | (Italy) Francesco Borgo (Italy) Marco Bortolotti; 6–2, 6–1 | (Romania) Alexandru-Daniel Carpen (Czech Republic) Michal Schmid | (Republic of Ireland) Sam Barry (Italy) Francesco Picco | (Italy) Marco Bortolotti (Germany) Peter Heller (Portugal) André Gaspar Murta (Republic of Ireland) Daniel Glancy |
| November 11 | Egypt F33 Futures; Sharm El Sheikh, Egypt; Clay $10,000 | (Germany) Steven Moneke; 6–4, 6–2 | (Spain) Marc Giner | (Egypt) Sherif Sabry (Austria) Tristan-Samuel Weissborn | (Egypt) Karim Hossam (Spain) Albert Alcaraz Ivorra (Germany) Jean-Marc Werner (Austria) Thomas Statzberger |
| November 11 | Egypt F33 Futures; Sharm El Sheikh, Egypt; Clay $10,000 | (Belgium) Romain Barbosa (Portugal) Frederico Ferreira Silva; 4–6, 6–1, [10–5] | (Russia) Maxim Kravtsov (Russia) Ivan Nedelko | (Egypt) Sherif Sabry (Austria) Tristan-Samuel Weissborn | (Egypt) Karim Hossam (Spain) Albert Alcaraz Ivorra (Germany) Jean-Marc Werner (Austria) Thomas Statzberger |
| November 11 | Greece F19 Futures; Heraklion, Greece; Hard $10,000 | (United Kingdom) Oliver Golding; 1–6, 6–2, 6–3 | (United Kingdom) Luke Bambridge | (Serbia) Miki Janković (United Kingdom) Liam Broady | (Italy) Federico Gaio (France) Laurent Malouli (Germany) Tim Nekic (Serbia) Nikola Ćaćić |
| November 11 | Greece F19 Futures; Heraklion, Greece; Hard $10,000 | (United Kingdom) Luke Bambridge (United Kingdom) Oliver Golding; 6–3, 7–5 | (Germany) Andreas Mies (Germany) Oscar Otte | (Serbia) Miki Janković (United Kingdom) Liam Broady | (Italy) Federico Gaio (France) Laurent Malouli (Germany) Tim Nekic (Serbia) Nikola Ćaćić |
| November 11 | India F9 Futures; Delhi, India; Hard $10,000 | (India) Yuki Bhambri; 6–2, 6–2 | (India) Sriram Balaji | (Germany) Torsten Wietoska (India) Vishnu Vardhan | (India) Karunuday Singh (India) Sidharth Rawat (Chinese Taipei) Hung Jui-chen (India) Jeevan Nedunchezhiyan |
| November 11 | India F9 Futures; Delhi, India; Hard $10,000 | (India) Sriram Balaji (India) Ranjeet Virali-Murugesan; 7–6^{(7–3)}, 6–3 | (India) Ramkumar Ramanathan (India) Ashwin Vijayragavan | (Germany) Torsten Wietoska (India) Vishnu Vardhan | (India) Karunuday Singh (India) Sidharth Rawat (Chinese Taipei) Hung Jui-chen (India) Jeevan Nedunchezhiyan |
| November 11 | Mexico F19 Futures; Mérida, Mexico; Hard $10,000 | (United States) Nicolas Meister; 6–7^{(4–7)}, 6–1, 7–6^{(9–7)} | (United States) Ernesto Escobedo | (United States) Kyle McMorrow (Mexico) Mauricio Astorga | (Mexico) Adrian Ortiz (Colombia) Michael Quintero (Mexico) Hans Hach (Brazil) Henrique Cunha |
| November 11 | Mexico F19 Futures; Mérida, Mexico; Hard $10,000 | (El Salvador) Marcelo Arévalo (Puerto Rico) Alex Llompart; 6–4, 7–5 | (Mexico) Daniel Garza (Mexico) Ángel Peredo | (United States) Kyle McMorrow (Mexico) Mauricio Astorga | (Mexico) Adrian Ortiz (Colombia) Michael Quintero (Mexico) Hans Hach (Brazil) Henrique Cunha |
| November 11 | Spain F39 Futures; Puerto de la Cruz, Spain; Carpet $10,000 | (Spain) José Checa Calvo; 6–3, 6–7^{(7–9)}, 6–3 | (Spain) Jaime Pulgar-García | (Spain) Iván Arenas-Gualda (Spain) Ricardo Ojeda Lara | (Spain) David Vega Hernández (Colombia) Juan Sebastián Gómez (Spain) Pedro Domínguez Alonso (Spain) Miguel Semmler |
| November 11 | Spain F39 Futures; Puerto de la Cruz, Spain; Carpet $10,000 | (Spain) Carlos Boluda-Purkiss (Spain) Roberto Ortega Olmedo; 6–1, 6–3 | (Spain) David Pérez Sanz (Spain) David Vega Hernández | (Spain) Iván Arenas-Gualda (Spain) Ricardo Ojeda Lara | (Spain) David Vega Hernández (Colombia) Juan Sebastián Gómez (Spain) Pedro Domínguez Alonso (Spain) Miguel Semmler |
| November 11 | Turkey F45 Futures; Antalya-Kaya-Belek, Turkey; Clay $10,000 | (Austria) Marc Rath; 6–1, 6–3 | (Georgia (country)) Nikoloz Basilashvili | (Czech Republic) Adam Pavlásek (Romania) Teodor-Dacian Crăciun | (United States) Adam El Mihdawy (Germany) Tom Schönenberg (Benin) Alexis Klégou (Netherlands) Colin van Beem |
| November 11 | Turkey F45 Futures; Antalya-Kaya-Belek, Turkey; Clay $10,000 | (Germany) Tom Schönenberg (Germany) Matthias Wunner; 6–0, 6–4 | (Georgia (country)) Nikoloz Basilashvili (Serbia) Miljan Zekić | (Czech Republic) Adam Pavlásek (Romania) Teodor-Dacian Crăciun | (United States) Adam El Mihdawy (Germany) Tom Schönenberg (Benin) Alexis Klégou (Netherlands) Colin van Beem |
| November 11 | USA F31 Futures; Bradenton, United States; Clay $10,000 | (Russia) Andrey Rublev; 3–6, 7–6^{(8–6)}, 6–3 | (Latvia) Mārtiņš Podžus | (United States) Greg Ouellette (United States) Noah Rubin | (United States) Devin McCarthy (United States) Stefan Kozlov (Monaco) Romain Arneodo (Japan) Naoki Nakagawa |
| November 11 | USA F31 Futures; Bradenton, United States; Clay $10,000 | (United States) Sekou Bangoura (United States) Stefan Kozlov; 6–2, 6–4 | (United States) Devin McCarthy (Canada) Tommy Mylnikov | (United States) Greg Ouellette (United States) Noah Rubin | (United States) Devin McCarthy (United States) Stefan Kozlov (Monaco) Romain Arneodo (Japan) Naoki Nakagawa |
| November 18 | Colombia F7 Futures; Bogotá, Colombia; Hard $15,000 | (Colombia) Juan Carlos Spir; 4–3, retired | (Colombia) Carlos Salamanca | (United States) Evan Song (Greece) Theodoros Angelinos | (Colombia) Felipe Mantilla (Venezuela) Luis David Martínez (South Africa) Dean O'Brien (United States) Vahid Mirzadeh |
| November 18 | Colombia F7 Futures; Bogotá, Colombia; Hard $15,000 | (Colombia) Felipe Mantilla (Colombia) Eduardo Struvay; 7–6^{(7–5)}, 2–6, [10–7] | (South Africa) Dean O'Brien (Colombia) Juan Carlos Spir | (United States) Evan Song (Greece) Theodoros Angelinos | (Colombia) Felipe Mantilla (Venezuela) Luis David Martínez (South Africa) Dean O'Brien (United States) Vahid Mirzadeh |
| November 18 | Czech Republic F6 Futures; Jablonec nad Nisou, Czech Republic; Carpet (indoor) $15,000 | (Belarus) Uladzimir Ignatik; 6–2, 6–3 | (Slovakia) Karol Beck | (Croatia) Filip Veger (Latvia) Andis Juška | (Czech Republic) Michal Konečný (Germany) Moritz Baumann (Czech Republic) Pavel Štaubert (United States) Błażej Koniusz |
| November 18 | Czech Republic F6 Futures; Jablonec nad Nisou, Czech Republic; Carpet (indoor) $15,000 | (Poland) Błażej Koniusz (Poland) Maciej Smoła; 4–6, 7–6^{(11–9)}, [10–5] | (Latvia) Andis Juška (Czech Republic) Robin Staněk | (Croatia) Filip Veger (Latvia) Andis Juška | (Czech Republic) Michal Konečný (Germany) Moritz Baumann (Czech Republic) Pavel Štaubert (United States) Błażej Koniusz |
| November 18 | India F10 Futures; Bhopal, India; Hard $15,000 | (India) Sriram Balaji; 7–5, 7–5 | (South Korea) Na Jung-woong | (India) Jeevan Nedunchezhiyan (India) Vijay Sundar Prashanth | (India) Ramkumar Ramanathan (Netherlands) David Pel (India) Karunuday Singh (India) Vishnu Vardhan |
| November 18 | India F10 Futures; Bhopal, India; Hard $15,000 | (India) Jeevan Nedunchezhiyan (India) Purav Raja; 6–3, 6–3 | (Kyrgyzstan) Daniiar Duldaev (India) Karunuday Singh | (India) Jeevan Nedunchezhiyan (India) Vijay Sundar Prashanth | (India) Ramkumar Ramanathan (Netherlands) David Pel (India) Karunuday Singh (India) Vishnu Vardhan |
| November 18 | Chile F8 Futures; Osorno, Chile; Clay (indoor) $10,000 | (Chile) Hans Podlipnik Castillo; 6–3, 6–2 | (Chile) Gonzalo Lama | (Austria) Michael Linzer (Argentina) Tomás Lipovšek Puches | (Argentina) Eduardo Agustín Torre (Argentina) Federico Coria (Brazil) Eduardo Dischinger (Argentina) Pedro Cachin |
| November 18 | Chile F8 Futures; Osorno, Chile; Clay (indoor) $10,000 | (Argentina) Valentín Florez (Japan) Ryusei Makiguchi; 7–6^{(8–6)}, 6–0 | (Chile) David Fleming (Chile) Víctor Núñez | (Austria) Michael Linzer (Argentina) Tomás Lipovšek Puches | (Argentina) Eduardo Agustín Torre (Argentina) Federico Coria (Brazil) Eduardo Dischinger (Argentina) Pedro Cachin |
| November 18 | Croatia F16 Futures; Bol, Croatia; Clay $10,000 | (Bosnia and Herzegovina) Tomislav Brkić; 4–6, 7–5, 7–5 | (Italy) Salvatore Caruso | (Slovenia) Mike Urbanija (France) Quentin Halys | (Croatia) Toni Androić (Croatia) Dino Marcan (Slovenia) Nik Razboršek (Germany) Ivo Mijic |
| November 18 | Croatia F16 Futures; Bol, Croatia; Clay $10,000 | Not played | | (Slovenia) Mike Urbanija (France) Quentin Halys | (Croatia) Toni Androić (Croatia) Dino Marcan (Slovenia) Nik Razboršek (Germany) Ivo Mijic |
| November 18 | Cyprus F2 Futures; Nicosia, Cyprus; Hard $10,000 | (Czech Republic) Michal Schmid; 6–4, 6–2 | (Serbia) Laslo Djere | (Ukraine) Vladyslav Manafov (Austria) Pascal Brunner | (Germany) Peter Heller (Bulgaria) Alexandar Lazov (Switzerland) Keivon Tabrizi (Serbia) Peđa Krstin |
| November 18 | Cyprus F2 Futures; Nicosia, Cyprus; Hard $10,000 | (Belgium) Sander Gillé (France) Matthieu Roy; 6–1, 6–3 | (Italy) Erik Crepaldi (Portugal) André Gaspar Murta | (Ukraine) Vladyslav Manafov (Austria) Pascal Brunner | (Germany) Peter Heller (Bulgaria) Alexandar Lazov (Switzerland) Keivon Tabrizi (Serbia) Peđa Krstin |
| November 18 | Greece F20 Futures; Rethymno, Greece; Hard $10,000 | (United Kingdom) Oliver Golding; 6–4, 7–6^{(7–4)} | (Serbia) Nikola Ćaćić | (United Kingdom) Marcus Willis (Austria) Bastian Trinker | (Serbia) Miki Janković (United Kingdom) Liam Broady (Greece) Alexandros Jakupovic (Germany) Tim Nekic |
| November 18 | Greece F20 Futures; Rethymno, Greece; Hard $10,000 | (United Kingdom) Lewis Burton (United Kingdom) Marcus Willis; 6–4, 7–6^{(7–5)} | (Serbia) Nikola Ćaćić (Greece) Alexandros Jakupovic | (United Kingdom) Marcus Willis (Austria) Bastian Trinker | (Serbia) Miki Janković (United Kingdom) Liam Broady (Greece) Alexandros Jakupovic (Germany) Tim Nekic |
| November 18 | Mexico F20 Futures; Mérida, Mexico; Hard $10,000 | (Canada) Pavel Krainik; 6–0, 6–3 | (Mexico) Tigre Hank | (Italy) Gianluigi Quinzi (El Salvador) Marcelo Arévalo | (Argentina) Mateo Nicolás Martínez (Mexico) Luis Patiño (Puerto Rico) Alex Llompart (Colombia) Michael Quintero |
| November 18 | Mexico F20 Futures; Mérida, Mexico; Hard $10,000 | (United States) Oscar Fabian Matthews (United States) Kyle McMorrow; 6–2, 6–3 | (Mexico) Tigre Hank (Mexico) Andrés Zepeda | (Italy) Gianluigi Quinzi (El Salvador) Marcelo Arévalo | (Argentina) Mateo Nicolás Martínez (Mexico) Luis Patiño (Puerto Rico) Alex Llompart (Colombia) Michael Quintero |
| November 18 | Spain F40 Futures; Puerto de la Cruz, Spain; Carpet $10,000 | (Spain) Roberto Ortega Olmedo; 7–5, 7–5 | (Spain) José Checa Calvo | (Germany) Peter Torebko (Spain) Iván Arenas-Gualda | (Colombia) Juan Sebastián Gómez (Spain) David Vega Hernández (Spain) Jaime Pulgar-García (Spain) Jorge Hernando Ruano |
| November 18 | Spain F40 Futures; Puerto de la Cruz, Spain; Carpet $10,000 | (Spain) Juan-Samuel Araúzo-Martínez (Spain) David Vega Hernández; 6–1, 2–6, [10–6] | (Colombia) Juan Sebastián Gómez (Spain) Adam Sanjurjo Hermida | (Germany) Peter Torebko (Spain) Iván Arenas-Gualda | (Colombia) Juan Sebastián Gómez (Spain) David Vega Hernández (Spain) Jaime Pulgar-García (Spain) Jorge Hernando Ruano |
| November 18 | Turkey F46 Futures; Antalya-Kaya-Belek, Turkey; Hard $10,000 | (Russia) Anton Zaitcev; 6–3, 3–0, retired | (Belgium) Joris De Loore | (Austria) Marc Rath (Switzerland) Michael Lammer | (Hungary) Viktor Filipenkó (Germany) Sebastian Wagner (United States) Adam El Mihdawy (Kuwait) Abdullah Maqdes |
| November 18 | Turkey F46 Futures; Antalya-Kaya-Belek, Turkey; Hard $10,000 | (Russia) Alexandr Chepelev (Russia) Anton Zaitcev; 3–6, 6–3, [11–9] | (France) Olivier Charroin (Switzerland) Siméon Rossier | (Austria) Marc Rath (Switzerland) Michael Lammer | (Hungary) Viktor Filipenkó (Germany) Sebastian Wagner (United States) Adam El Mihdawy (Kuwait) Abdullah Maqdes |
| November 25 | Czech Republic F7 Futures; Opava, Czech Republic; Carpet (indoor) $15,000 | (Lithuania) Laurynas Grigelis; 4–6, 6–3, 7–6^{(7–2)} | (Belarus) Uladzimir Ignatik | (Slovakia) Karol Beck (Poland) Błażej Koniusz | (Slovakia) Adrian Sikora (Latvia) Andis Juška (Slovakia) Juraj Masár (Czech Republic) Dominik Süč |
| November 25 | Czech Republic F7 Futures; Opava, Czech Republic; Carpet (indoor) $15,000 | (Poland) Błażej Koniusz (Poland) Maciej Smoła; 6–3, 6–0 | (Czech Republic) Jan Blecha (Czech Republic) Roman Jebavý | (Slovakia) Karol Beck (Poland) Błażej Koniusz | (Slovakia) Adrian Sikora (Latvia) Andis Juška (Slovakia) Juraj Masár (Czech Republic) Dominik Süč |
| November 25 | Senegal F1 Futures; Dakar, Senegal; Hard $15,000 | (Croatia) Ante Pavić; 5–0, retired | (Austria) Maximilian Neuchrist | (Zimbabwe) Takanyi Garanganga (Bosnia and Herzegovina) Aldin Šetkić | (France) Théo Fournerie (South Africa) Damon Gooch (Italy) Francesco Garzelli (Venezuela) Jordi Muñoz Abreu |
| November 25 | Senegal F1 Futures; Dakar, Senegal; Hard $15,000 | (Austria) Maximilian Neuchrist (Bosnia and Herzegovina) Aldin Šetkić; 6–1, 6–4 | (Italy) Francesco Garzelli (Venezuela) Jordi Muñoz Abreu | (Zimbabwe) Takanyi Garanganga (Bosnia and Herzegovina) Aldin Šetkić | (France) Théo Fournerie (South Africa) Damon Gooch (Italy) Francesco Garzelli (Venezuela) Jordi Muñoz Abreu |
| November 25 | Thailand F4 Futures; Bangkok, Thailand; Hard $15,000 | (Japan) Yasutaka Uchiyama; 6–1, 3–6, 6–1 | (Australia) Luke Saville | (Croatia) Borna Ćorić (India) Karunuday Singh | (United States) Daniel Nguyen (Australia) Jacob Grills (Thailand) Singekrawee Wattanakul (India) Sanam Singh |
| November 25 | Thailand F4 Futures; Bangkok, Thailand; Hard $15,000 | (South Korea) Lim Yong-kyu (South Korea) Noh Sang-woo; 7–5, 7–6^{(7–4)} | (Japan) Yuichi Ito (Japan) Yasutaka Uchiyama | (Croatia) Borna Ćorić (India) Karunuday Singh | (United States) Daniel Nguyen (Australia) Jacob Grills (Thailand) Singekrawee Wattanakul (India) Sanam Singh |
| November 25 | Venezuela F8 Futures; Valencia, Venezuela; Hard $15,000 | (Venezuela) Ricardo Rodríguez; 5–7, 6–1, 6–4 | (Venezuela) David Souto | (Ecuador) Iván Endara (Argentina) Juan Ignacio Londero | (Venezuela) Roberto Maytín (Argentina) Mateo Nicolás Martínez (Argentina) Maximiliano Estévez (Mexico) Tigre Hank |
| November 25 | Venezuela F8 Futures; Valencia, Venezuela; Hard $15,000 | (Argentina) Maximiliano Estévez (Argentina) Juan Ignacio Londero; 7–6^{(7–5)}, 6–2 | (Venezuela) Piero Luisi (Venezuela) Roberto Maytín | (Ecuador) Iván Endara (Argentina) Juan Ignacio Londero | (Venezuela) Roberto Maytín (Argentina) Mateo Nicolás Martínez (Argentina) Maximiliano Estévez (Mexico) Tigre Hank |
| November 25 | Brazil F18 Futures; Foz do Iguaçu, Brazil; Clay $10,000 | (Brazil) Rafael Camilo; 7–5, 6–3 | (Argentina) Facundo Mena | (Brazil) André Miele (Brazil) Caio Silva | (Brazil) Alexandre Tsuchiya (Uruguay) Martín Cuevas (Argentina) Juan Pablo Paz (Brazil) Marcos Vinicius Azevedo Silva |
| November 25 | Brazil F18 Futures; Foz do Iguaçu, Brazil; Clay $10,000 | (Brazil) Wilson Leite (Sweden) Christian Lindell; 4–6, 6–4, [12–10] | (Argentina) Facundo Mena (Argentina) Joaquin-Jesús Monteferrario | (Brazil) André Miele (Brazil) Caio Silva | (Brazil) Alexandre Tsuchiya (Uruguay) Martín Cuevas (Argentina) Juan Pablo Paz (Brazil) Marcos Vinicius Azevedo Silva |
| November 25 | Cambodia F1 Futures; Phnom Penh, Cambodia; Hard $10,000 | (Australia) Andrew Whittington; 7–5, 6–0 | (Australia) Gavin van Peperzeel | (Thailand) Danai Udomchoke (Japan) Hiroki Kondo | (Chinese Taipei) Yang Tsung-hua (South Korea) Dylan Seong-kwan Kim (United States) Mico Santiago (Spain) Óscar Hernández |
| November 25 | Cambodia F1 Futures; Phnom Penh, Cambodia; Hard $10,000 | (Australia) Gavin van Peperzeel (Australia) Andrew Whittington; 6–3, 3–6, [10–7] | (Thailand) Wishaya Trongcharoenchaikul (Thailand) Danai Udomchoke | (Thailand) Danai Udomchoke (Japan) Hiroki Kondo | (Chinese Taipei) Yang Tsung-hua (South Korea) Dylan Seong-kwan Kim (United States) Mico Santiago (Spain) Óscar Hernández |
| November 25 | Chile F9 Futures; Santiago, Chile; Clay $10,000 | (Chile) Gonzalo Lama; 6–1, 6–4 | (Argentina) Andrés Molteni | (Chile) Jorge Montero (Argentina) Pablo Galdón | (Argentina) Valentín Florez (Chile) Hans Podlipnik Castillo (Argentina) Federico Coria (Chile) Juan Carlos Sáez |
| November 25 | Chile F9 Futures; Santiago, Chile; Clay $10,000 | (Argentina) Pedro Cachin (Chile) Guillermo Núñez; 7–5, 6–3 | (Chile) Nicolás Jarry (Chile) Simón Navarro | (Chile) Jorge Montero (Argentina) Pablo Galdón | (Argentina) Valentín Florez (Chile) Hans Podlipnik Castillo (Argentina) Federico Coria (Chile) Juan Carlos Sáez |
| November 25 | Croatia F17 Futures; Bol, Croatia; Clay $10,000 | (Croatia) Toni Androić; 6–1, 6–1 | (Croatia) Matej Sabanov | (Bosnia and Herzegovina) Tomislav Brkić (Croatia) Ivan Sabanov | (Croatia) Antonio Šančić (Spain) Sergio Martos Gornés (Italy) Riccardo Bonadio (Serbia) Goran Tošić |
| November 25 | Croatia F17 Futures; Bol, Croatia; Clay $10,000 | (Serbia) Nikola Ćirić (Serbia) Goran Tošić; Walkover | (Bosnia and Herzegovina) Tomislav Brkić (Croatia) Antonio Šančić | (Bosnia and Herzegovina) Tomislav Brkić (Croatia) Ivan Sabanov | (Croatia) Antonio Šančić (Spain) Sergio Martos Gornés (Italy) Riccardo Bonadio (Serbia) Goran Tošić |
| November 25 | Cyprus F3 Futures; Larnaca, Cyprus; Hard $10,000 | (Italy) Erik Crepaldi; 6–3, 6–3 | (Bulgaria) Alexandar Lazov | (Serbia) Laslo Djere (Poland) Grzegorz Panfil | (Austria) Pascal Brunner (France) Matthieu Roy (Portugal) André Gaspar Murta (Republic of Ireland) Daniel Glancy |
| November 25 | Cyprus F3 Futures; Larnaca, Cyprus; Hard $10,000 | (Romania) Alexandru-Daniel Carpen (Poland) Grzegorz Panfil; 2–6, 6–1, [10–8] | (Bulgaria) Alexandar Lazov (Ukraine) Vladyslav Manafov | (Serbia) Laslo Djere (Poland) Grzegorz Panfil | (Austria) Pascal Brunner (France) Matthieu Roy (Portugal) André Gaspar Murta (Republic of Ireland) Daniel Glancy |
| November 25 | Egypt F34 Futures; Sharm El Sheikh, Egypt; Clay $10,000 | (Spain) Marc Giner; Default | (Belarus) Egor Gerasimov | (Serbia) Nikola Milojević (Egypt) Karim Hossam | (Ukraine) Dmytro Badanov (Germany) Steven Moneke (Serbia) Peđa Krstin (Egypt) Sherif Sabry |
| November 25 | Egypt F34 Futures; Sharm El Sheikh, Egypt; Clay $10,000 | (North Macedonia) Tomislav Jotovski (Serbia) Peđa Krstin; 6–2, 6–3 | (France) Melik Feler (Burundi) Hassan Ndayishimiye | (Serbia) Nikola Milojević (Egypt) Karim Hossam | (Ukraine) Dmytro Badanov (Germany) Steven Moneke (Serbia) Peđa Krstin (Egypt) Sherif Sabry |
| November 25 | India F11 Futures; Raipur, India; Hard $10,000 | (India) Ramkumar Ramanathan; 3–6, 7–6^{(8–6)}, 6–4 | (South Korea) Lee Duck-hee | (South Korea) Na Jung-woong (Germany) Torsten Wietoska | (India) Ranjeet Virali-Murugesan (Chinese Taipei) Hung Jui-chen (Greece) Markos Kalovelonis (India) Sriram Balaji |
| November 25 | India F11 Futures; Raipur, India; Hard $10,000 | (India) Sriram Balaji (India) Ranjeet Virali-Murugesan; 6–1, 6–3 | (India) Mohit Mayur Jayaprakash (India) Ramkumar Ramanathan | (South Korea) Na Jung-woong (Germany) Torsten Wietoska | (India) Ranjeet Virali-Murugesan (Chinese Taipei) Hung Jui-chen (Greece) Markos Kalovelonis (India) Sriram Balaji |
| November 25 | Spain F41 Futures; Puerto del Carmen, Spain; Hard $10,000 | (Russia) Alexey Vatutin; 6–4, 6–4 | (Portugal) Frederico Ferreira Silva | (Spain) Juan-Samuel Araúzo-Martínez (Spain) Roberto Ortega Olmedo | (Spain) Jorge Hernando-Ruano (Norway) Viktor Durasovic (Spain) Samuel Ribeiro Navarrete (United Kingdom) Matthew Short |
| November 25 | Spain F41 Futures; Puerto del Carmen, Spain; Hard $10,000 | (Spain) Marcos Conde-Jackson (Spain) David Marrero; 6–3, 6–3 | (Spain) Juan-Samuel Araúzo-Martínez (Spain) Jaime Pulgar-García | (Spain) Juan-Samuel Araúzo-Martínez (Spain) Roberto Ortega Olmedo | (Spain) Jorge Hernando-Ruano (Norway) Viktor Durasovic (Spain) Samuel Ribeiro Navarrete (United Kingdom) Matthew Short |
| November 25 | Turkey F47 Futures; Antalya-Kaya-Belek, Turkey; Hard $10,000 | (France) Julien Obry; 6–0, 6–2 | (Spain) Juan Lizariturry | (Belgium) Jonas Merckx (Russia) Stanislav Vovk | (Belgium) Joris De Loore (France) Jules Marie (Russia) Anton Zaitcev (Belgium) Yannik Reuter |
| November 25 | Turkey F47 Futures; Antalya-Kaya-Belek, Turkey; Hard $10,000 | (Netherlands) Wesley Koolhof (Italy) Alessandro Motti; 6–4, 4–6, [10–7] | (France) Julien Obry (France) Enzo Py | (Belgium) Jonas Merckx (Russia) Stanislav Vovk | (Belgium) Joris De Loore (France) Jules Marie (Russia) Anton Zaitcev (Belgium) Yannik Reuter |

=== December ===
| Week of | Tournament | Winner | Runners-up | Semifinalists | Quarterfinalists |
|---|---|---|---|---|---|
| December 2 | Senegal F2 Futures; Dakar, Senegal; Hard $15,000 | (Austria) Maximilian Neuchrist; 4–6, 7–6^{(7–5)}, 6–2 | (Bosnia and Herzegovina) Aldin Šetkić | (Zimbabwe) Takanyi Garanganga (France) Axel Michon | (Benin) Alexis Klégou (France) Arthur Surreaux (South Africa) Damon Gooch (Czech Republic) Ivo Minář |
| December 2 | Senegal F2 Futures; Dakar, Senegal; Hard $15,000 | (Switzerland) Luca Margaroli (Czech Republic) Libor Salaba; 6–4, 6–4 | (Zimbabwe) Mark Fynn (South Africa) Damon Gooch | (Zimbabwe) Takanyi Garanganga (France) Axel Michon | (Benin) Alexis Klégou (France) Arthur Surreaux (South Africa) Damon Gooch (Czech Republic) Ivo Minář |
| December 2 | Thailand F5 Futures; Bangkok, Thailand; Hard $15,000 | (Netherlands) Boy Westerhof; 6–1, 6–4 | (India) Karunuday Singh | (Croatia) Borna Ćorić (Japan) Yasutaka Uchiyama | (United Kingdom) Brydan Klein (Chinese Taipei) Chen Ti (Croatia) Mate Pavić (Spain) Enrique López Pérez |
| December 2 | Thailand F5 Futures; Bangkok, Thailand; Hard $15,000 | (China) Gao Peng (China) Gao Wan; 6–4, 6–7^{(3–7)}, [16–14] | (Japan) Yuichi Ito (Japan) Yasutaka Uchiyama | (Croatia) Borna Ćorić (Japan) Yasutaka Uchiyama | (United Kingdom) Brydan Klein (Chinese Taipei) Chen Ti (Croatia) Mate Pavić (Spain) Enrique López Pérez |
| December 2 | Venezuela F9 Futures; Caracas, Venezuela; Clay $15,000 | (Argentina) Juan Ignacio Londero; 6–2, 6–1 | (Venezuela) Luis David Martínez | (Venezuela) David Souto (Argentina) Mateo Nicolás Martínez | (Venezuela) Ricardo Rodríguez (Ecuador) Iván Endara (Colombia) Oscar Torres (Mexico) Tigre Hank |
| December 2 | Venezuela F9 Futures; Caracas, Venezuela; Clay $15,000 | (Venezuela) Piero Luisi (Venezuela) Roberto Maytín; 6–3, 6–4 | (Argentina) Juan Ignacio Londero (Argentina) Mateo Nicolás Martínez | (Venezuela) David Souto (Argentina) Mateo Nicolás Martínez | (Venezuela) Ricardo Rodríguez (Ecuador) Iván Endara (Colombia) Oscar Torres (Mexico) Tigre Hank |
| December 2 | Brazil F19 Futures; Porto Alegre, Brazil; Clay $10,000 | (Argentina) Andrea Collarini; 7–6^{(7–2)}, 6–1 | (Uruguay) Fernando Romboli | (Brazil) Carlos Eduardo Severino (Brazil) Martín Cuevas | (Argentina) Facundo Mena (Argentina) Nicolás Kicker (Brazil) Wilson Leite (Brazil) José Pereira |
| December 2 | Brazil F19 Futures; Porto Alegre, Brazil; Clay $10,000 | (Brazil) Rafael Camilo (Brazil) Fabrício Neis; 6–4, 7–6^{(7–4)} | (Brazil) José Pereira (Brazil) Alexandre Tsuchiya | (Brazil) Carlos Eduardo Severino (Brazil) Martín Cuevas | (Argentina) Facundo Mena (Argentina) Nicolás Kicker (Brazil) Wilson Leite (Brazil) José Pereira |
| December 2 | Cambodia F2 Futures; Phnom Penh, Cambodia; Hard $10,000 | (India) Ramkumar Ramanathan; 6–1, 4–6, 6–4 | (United Kingdom) Josh Goodall | (Germany) Robin Kern (Japan) Hiroki Kondo | (Chinese Taipei) Yang Tsung-hua (Japan) Yusuke Watanuki (South Korea) Cho Soong-jae (Slovakia) Ivo Klec |
| December 2 | Cambodia F2 Futures; Phnom Penh, Cambodia; Hard $10,000 | (Japan) Takuto Niki (Japan) Arata Onozawa; 7–6^{(12–10)}, 7–6^{(10–8)} | (Japan) Toshihide Matsui (Thailand) Danai Udomchoke | (Germany) Robin Kern (Japan) Hiroki Kondo | (Chinese Taipei) Yang Tsung-hua (Japan) Yusuke Watanuki (South Korea) Cho Soong-jae (Slovakia) Ivo Klec |
| December 2 | Chile F10 Futures; Temuco, Chile; Clay $10,000 | (Chile) Hans Podlipnik Castillo; 6–3, 6–4 | (Argentina) Andrés Molteni | (Argentina) Pablo Galdón (Argentina) Pedro Cachin | (Chile) Jorge Aguilar (Chile) Bastián Malla (Chile) Jorge Montero (Chile) Ricardo Urzúa-Rivera |
| December 2 | Chile F10 Futures; Temuco, Chile; Clay $10,000 | (Argentina) Pablo Galdón (Argentina) Andrés Molteni; 6–1, 6–1 | (Chile) Mauricio Álvarez-Guzmán (Chile) Hans Podlipnik Castillo | (Argentina) Pablo Galdón (Argentina) Pedro Cachin | (Chile) Jorge Aguilar (Chile) Bastián Malla (Chile) Jorge Montero (Chile) Ricardo Urzúa-Rivera |
| December 2 | Egypt F35 Futures; Sharm El Sheikh, Egypt; Clay $10,000 | (Egypt) Mohamed Safwat; 6–4, 7–6^{(7–1)} | (Serbia) Peđa Krstin | (Australia) Jason Kubler (Italy) Enrico Burzi | (Germany) Jean-Marc Werner (Egypt) Sherif Sabry (Germany) Steven Moneke (Italy) Antonio Campo |
| December 2 | Egypt F35 Futures; Sharm El Sheikh, Egypt; Clay $10,000 | (Australia) Jason Kubler (Germany) Jean-Marc Werner; 7–6^{(7–2)}, 7–6^{(8–6)} | (Ukraine) Dmytro Badanov (Russia) Yan Sabanin | (Australia) Jason Kubler (Italy) Enrico Burzi | (Germany) Jean-Marc Werner (Egypt) Sherif Sabry (Germany) Steven Moneke (Italy) Antonio Campo |
| December 2 | Qatar F3 Futures; Doha, Qatar; Hard $10,000 | (Republic of Ireland) Sam Barry; 7–6^{(7–2)}, 6–4 | (United Kingdom) Liam Broady | (Luxembourg) Ugo Nastasi (Germany) Mats Moraing | (Russia) Evgeny Karlovskiy (Sweden) Jacob Adaktusson (Germany) Tom Schönenberg (United Kingdom) Luke Bambridge |
| December 2 | Qatar F3 Futures; Doha, Qatar; Hard $10,000 | (Poland) Adam Chadaj (Germany) Dominik Schulz; 1–6, 7–6^{(7–4)}, [10–4] | (United Kingdom) Luke Bambridge (United Kingdom) Evan Hoyt | (Luxembourg) Ugo Nastasi (Germany) Mats Moraing | (Russia) Evgeny Karlovskiy (Sweden) Jacob Adaktusson (Germany) Tom Schönenberg (United Kingdom) Luke Bambridge |
| December 2 | Spain F42 Futures; Puerto del Carmen, Spain; Hard $10,000 | (Spain) José Checa Calvo; 6–4, 6–1 | (Italy) Andrea Basso | (Spain) Iván Arenas-Gualda (Slovakia) Adrian Sikora | (Russia) Alexey Vatutin (Spain) Jaime Pulgar-García (Portugal) Frederico Ferreira Silva (Russia) Philipp Davydenko |
| December 2 | Spain F42 Futures; Puerto del Carmen, Spain; Hard $10,000 | (Spain) Iván Arenas-Gualda (Slovakia) Adrian Sikora; 6–2, 6–2 | (Spain) Eduard Esteve Lobato (Spain) Oriol Roca Batalla | (Spain) Iván Arenas-Gualda (Slovakia) Adrian Sikora | (Russia) Alexey Vatutin (Spain) Jaime Pulgar-García (Portugal) Frederico Ferreira Silva (Russia) Philipp Davydenko |
| December 2 | Turkey F48 Futures; Antalya-Kaya-Belek, Turkey; Hard $10,000 | (Bosnia and Herzegovina) Mirza Bašić; 7–5, 6–4 | (United Kingdom) Edward Corrie | (United States) Nikita Kryvonos (France) Julien Obry | (Austria) Bastian Trinker (France) Enzo Py (Austria) Dennis Novak (Belgium) Jonas Merckx |
| December 2 | Turkey F48 Futures; Antalya-Kaya-Belek, Turkey; Hard $10,000 | (Germany) Florian Barth (Kazakhstan) Denis Yevseyev; 6–3, 6–3 | (Russia) Alexander Mozgovoy (Germany) Sebastian Wagner | (United States) Nikita Kryvonos (France) Julien Obry | (Austria) Bastian Trinker (France) Enzo Py (Austria) Dennis Novak (Belgium) Jonas Merckx |
| December 9 | Brazil F20 Futures; Santa Maria, Brazil; Clay $15,000 | (Brazil) José Pereira; 7–5, 6–7^{(5–7)}, 6–2 | (Sweden) Christian Lindell | (Brazil) Orlando Luz (Argentina) Guillermo Durán | (Argentina) Nicolás Kicker (Argentina) Maximiliano Estévez (Argentina) Patricio Heras (Brazil) Wilson Leite |
| December 9 | Brazil F20 Futures; Santa Maria, Brazil; Clay $15,000 | (Brazil) José Pereira (Brazil) Alexandre Tsuchiya; 7–5, 6–3 | (Argentina) Guillermo Durán (Sweden) Christian Lindell | (Brazil) Orlando Luz (Argentina) Guillermo Durán | (Argentina) Nicolás Kicker (Argentina) Maximiliano Estévez (Argentina) Patricio Heras (Brazil) Wilson Leite |
| December 9 | Cambodia F3 Futures; Phnom Penh, Cambodia; Hard $10,000 | (Chinese Taipei) Chen Ti; 6–3, 6–4 | (Japan) Toshihide Matsui | (India) Karunuday Singh (India) Ramkumar Ramanathan | (United States) Mico Santiago (United Kingdom) Harry Meehan (Russia) Alexander Zhurbin (Germany) Robin Kern |
| December 9 | Cambodia F3 Futures; Phnom Penh, Cambodia; Hard $10,000 | (India) Ramkumar Ramanathan (India) Karunuday Singh; 6–4, 6–3 | (Japan) Takuto Niki (Japan) Arata Onozawa | (India) Karunuday Singh (India) Ramkumar Ramanathan | (United States) Mico Santiago (United Kingdom) Harry Meehan (Russia) Alexander Zhurbin (Germany) Robin Kern |
| December 9 | Chile F11 Futures; Quillota, Chile; Clay $10,000 | (Japan) Yoshihito Nishioka; 7–5, 6–2 | (Argentina) Andrés Molteni | (Chile) Hans Podlipnik Castillo (Argentina) Eduardo Agustín Torre | (Chile) Guillermo Rivera Aránguiz (Argentina) Tomás Lipovšek Puches (Argentina) Mateo Facundo Cressa (Brazil) Augusto Laranja |
| December 9 | Chile F11 Futures; Quillota, Chile; Clay $10,000 | (Argentina) Tomás Lipovšek Puches (Argentina) Eduardo Agustín Torre; 7–5, 6–3 | (Brazil) Augusto Laranja (Argentina) Santiago Maccio | (Chile) Hans Podlipnik Castillo (Argentina) Eduardo Agustín Torre | (Chile) Guillermo Rivera Aránguiz (Argentina) Tomás Lipovšek Puches (Argentina) Mateo Facundo Cressa (Brazil) Augusto Laranja |
| December 9 | Egypt F36 Futures; Sharm El Sheikh, Egypt; Clay $10,000 | (Australia) Jason Kubler; 7–5, 6–3 | (Egypt) Sherif Sabry | (Egypt) Mohamed Safwat (Italy) Giulio Torroni | (Ukraine) Igor Sobolta (Italy) Enrico Burzi (Germany) Peter Heller (Germany) Steven Moneke |
| December 9 | Egypt F36 Futures; Sharm El Sheikh, Egypt; Clay $10,000 | (South Korea) Oh Seong-gook (South Korea) Yun Jae-won; 6–3, 4–6, [10–4] | (Austria) Gibril Diarra (Burundi) Hassan Ndayishimiye | (Egypt) Mohamed Safwat (Italy) Giulio Torroni | (Ukraine) Igor Sobolta (Italy) Enrico Burzi (Germany) Peter Heller (Germany) Steven Moneke |
| December 9 | Qatar F4 Futures; Doha, Qatar; Hard $10,000 | (Bulgaria) Tihomir Grozdanov; 7–6^{(10–8)}, 6–3 | (United States) Michael Shabaz | (United Kingdom) Oliver Golding (Spain) Roberto Ortega Olmedo | (Slovenia) Tom Kočevar-Dešman (Russia) Evgeny Karlovskiy (Georgia (country)) Nikoloz Basilashvili (France) Maxime Chazal |
| December 9 | Qatar F4 Futures; Doha, Qatar; Hard $10,000 | (United Kingdom) Evan Hoyt (Tunisia) Skander Mansouri; 6–4, 7–6^{(7–2)} | (Georgia (country)) Nikoloz Basilashvili (Belarus) Yahor Yatsyk | (United Kingdom) Oliver Golding (Spain) Roberto Ortega Olmedo | (Slovenia) Tom Kočevar-Dešman (Russia) Evgeny Karlovskiy (Georgia (country)) Nikoloz Basilashvili (France) Maxime Chazal |
| December 9 | Turkey F49 Futures; Antalya-Kaya-Belek, Turkey; Hard $10,000 | (Ukraine) Artem Smirnov; 5–7, 6–3, 6–2 | (France) Julien Obry | (France) Fabrice Martin (Italy) Erik Crepaldi | (Bosnia and Herzegovina) Tomislav Brkić (Spain) Albert Alcaraz Ivorra (Turkey) Cem İlkel (United Kingdom) Neil Pauffley |
| December 9 | Turkey F49 Futures; Antalya-Kaya-Belek, Turkey; Hard $10,000 | (Russia) Andrei Plotniy (Ukraine) Artem Smirnov; 6–3, 6–4 | (France) Fabrice Martin (France) Julien Obry | (France) Fabrice Martin (Italy) Erik Crepaldi | (Bosnia and Herzegovina) Tomislav Brkić (Spain) Albert Alcaraz Ivorra (Turkey) Cem İlkel (United Kingdom) Neil Pauffley |
| December 16 | Brazil F21 Futures; Cascavel, Brazil; Clay $10,000 | (Sweden) Christian Lindell; 7–6^{(7–3)}, 6–3 | (Argentina) Patricio Heras | (Germany) Moritz Buerchner (Brazil) Caio Silva | (Argentina) Facundo Mena (Argentina) Francisco Arrechea (Argentina) Gaston Paz (Argentina) Juan Pablo Paz |
| December 16 | Brazil F21 Futures; Cascavel, Brazil; Clay $10,000 | (Canada) Julien Belair (Germany) Moritz Buerchner; 7–5, 6–3 | (Brazil) Gustavo Junqueira de Andrade (Brazil) Victor-Carvalho Melo | (Germany) Moritz Buerchner (Brazil) Caio Silva | (Argentina) Facundo Mena (Argentina) Francisco Arrechea (Argentina) Gaston Paz (Argentina) Juan Pablo Paz |
| December 16 | Chile F12 Futures; San Felipe, Chile; Clay $10,000 | (Japan) Yoshihito Nishioka; 6–4, 6–2 | (Chile) Jorge Aguilar | (Chile) Ricardo Urzúa-Rivera (Chile) Juan Carlos Sáez | (Chile) Nicolás Jarry (Brazil) Augusto Laranja (Argentina) Tomás Lipovšek Puches (Japan) Ryusei Makiguchi |
| December 16 | Chile F12 Futures; San Felipe, Chile; Clay $10,000 | (Chile) Jorge Aguilar (Chile) Víctor Núñez; 6–7^{(5–7)}, 6–3, [10–5] | (Chile) David Fleming (Chile) Juan Matías González Carrasco | (Chile) Ricardo Urzúa-Rivera (Chile) Juan Carlos Sáez | (Chile) Nicolás Jarry (Brazil) Augusto Laranja (Argentina) Tomás Lipovšek Puches (Japan) Ryusei Makiguchi |
| December 16 | Qatar F5 Futures; Doha, Qatar; Hard $10,000 | (Slovakia) Ivo Klec; 6–1, 4–6, 6–3 | (Netherlands) Niels Lootsma | (France) Constantin Belot (United Kingdom) Luke Bambridge | (Slovenia) Tom Kočevar-Dešman (United States) Michael Shabaz (Georgia (country)) Nikoloz Basilashvili (France) Jonathan Kanar |
| December 16 | Qatar F5 Futures; Doha, Qatar; Hard $10,000 | (Slovakia) Marko Danis (Slovakia) Ivo Klec; 4–6, 6–3, [11–9] | (Germany) Mats Moraing (Germany) Tom Schönenberg | (France) Constantin Belot (United Kingdom) Luke Bambridge | (Slovenia) Tom Kočevar-Dešman (United States) Michael Shabaz (Georgia (country)) Nikoloz Basilashvili (France) Jonathan Kanar |
| December 16 | Turkey F50 Futures; Antalya-Kaya-Belek, Turkey; Hard $10,000 | (France) Julien Obry; 6–3, 7–5 | (Bosnia and Herzegovina) Aldin Šetkić | (Chinese Taipei) Chen Ti (Netherlands) Alban Meuffels | (United States) Nikita Kryvonos (Finland) Herkko Pöllänen (Georgia (country)) Giorgi Javakhishvili (France) Tristan Lamasine |
| December 16 | Turkey F50 Futures; Antalya-Kaya-Belek, Turkey; Hard $10,000 | (Bosnia and Herzegovina) Tomislav Brkić (Bosnia and Herzegovina) Aldin Šetkić; 6–2, 6–1 | (Netherlands) Alban Meuffels (Lithuania) Lukas Mugevičius | (Chinese Taipei) Chen Ti (Netherlands) Alban Meuffels | (United States) Nikita Kryvonos (Finland) Herkko Pöllänen (Georgia (country)) Giorgi Javakhishvili (France) Tristan Lamasine |
| December 23 | Turkey F51 Futures; Istanbul, Turkey; Hard (indoor) $10,000 | (Croatia) Borna Ćorić; 6–4, 3–6, 6–4 | (Turkey) Barış Ergüden | (Chinese Taipei) Chen Ti (Moldova) Maxim Dubarenco | (Germany) Pirmin Hänle (Italy) Francesco Borgo (Turkey) Efe Yurtacan (Russia) Stanislav Vovk |
| December 23 | Turkey F51 Futures; Istanbul, Turkey; Hard (indoor) $10,000 | (Chinese Taipei) Chen Ti (Russia) Stanislav Vovk; 6–4, 6–1 | (Turkey) Tuna Altuna (Turkey) Barış Ergüden | (Chinese Taipei) Chen Ti (Moldova) Maxim Dubarenco | (Germany) Pirmin Hänle (Italy) Francesco Borgo (Turkey) Efe Yurtacan (Russia) Stanislav Vovk |
