= 2016 Tilia Slovenia Open – Doubles =

Doubles
- 2016 Tilia Slovenia Open

Final
- Champions: (Belarus) Sergey Betov (Belarus) Ilya Ivashka
- Runners-up: (Croatia) Tomislav Draganja (Croatia) Nino Serdarušić
- Score: 1–6, 6–3, [10–4]

Events
Singles	Doubles
← 2015 ·	Tilia Slovenia Open	· 2017 →

Fabrice Martin and Purav Raja were the defending champions but chose not to defend their title.

Sergey Betov and Ilya Ivashka won the title after defeating Tomislav Draganja and Nino Serdarušić 1–6, 6–3, [10–4] in the final.

== Seeds ==
1. (United States) James Cerretani / (Austria) Philipp Oswald (quarterfinals)
2. (Belgium) Ruben Bemelmans / (Spain) Adrián Menéndez-Maceiras (semifinals)
3. (Russia) Alexander Kudryavtsev / (Russia) Daniil Medvedev (first round)
4. (France) Albano Olivetti / (France) Alexandre Sidorenko (quarterfinals)

== Draw ==
=== Key ===
- Q = Qualifier
- WC = Wild card
- LL = Lucky loser
- Alt = Alternate
- SE = Special exempt
- PR = Protected ranking
- ITF = ITF entry
- JE = Junior exempt
- w/o = Walkover
- r = Retired
- d = Defaulted
- SR = Special ranking

First round
1	(United States) J Cerretani (Austria) P Oswald	6	3	[10]
(Slovenia) T Kočevar-Desman (Czech Republic) J Mertl	1	6	[7]
(Slovenia) B Kavčič (Slovenia) B Rola	2	6	[11]
(Egypt) M Safwat (Serbia) Ilija Vučić	6	3	[9]
4	(France) A Olivetti (France) A Sidorenko	6	1	[10]
WC	(Slovenia) Domen Gostinčar (Slovenia) A Radinski	3	6	[7]
WC	(Slovenia) Aljaž Jakob Kaplja (Slovenia) Sven Lah	4	6^{4}
(Belarus) S Betov (Belarus) I Ivashka	6	7^{7}
WC	(Slovenia) David Lucas Ambrozić (Slovenia) Miha Peruš	3	3
(Croatia) T Draganja (Croatia) N Serdarušić	6	6
(Germany) A Satschko (Germany) S Stadler	6	6
3	(Russia) A Kudryavtsev (Russia) D Medvedev	2	3
(Turkey) T Altuna (Serbia) M Tepavac	5	6	[10]
(Czech Republic) Michal Konečný (Bosnia and Herzegovina) A Šetkić	7	3	[3]
(France) D Guez (Belgium) Y Mertens	3	2
2	(Belgium) R Bemelmans (Spain) A Menéndez-Maceiras	6	6

Quarterfinals
1	(United States) J Cerretani (Austria) P Oswald	1	5
(Slovenia) B Kavčič (Slovenia) B Rola	6	7
4	(France) A Olivetti (France) A Sidorenko	2	3
(Belarus) S Betov (Belarus) I Ivashka	6	6
(Croatia) T Draganja (Croatia) N Serdarušić	6	6
(Germany) A Satschko (Germany) S Stadler	3	3
(Turkey) T Altuna (Serbia) M Tepavac	1	2
2	(Belgium) R Bemelmans (Spain) A Menéndez-Maceiras	6	6

Semifinals
(Slovenia) B Kavčič (Slovenia) B Rola	2	7^{7}	[2]
(Belarus) S Betov (Belarus) I Ivashka	6	6^{4}	[10]
(Croatia) T Draganja (Croatia) N Serdarušić	6	6
2	(Belgium) R Bemelmans (Spain) A Menéndez-Maceiras	3	2

Final
(Belarus) S Betov (Belarus) I Ivashka	1	6	[10]
(Croatia) T Draganja (Croatia) N Serdarušić	6	3	[4]
