= 2018 Tilia Slovenia Open – Doubles =

Doubles
- 2018 Tilia Slovenia Open

Final
- Champions: (Spain) Gerard Granollers; (Czech Republic) Lukáš Rosol
- Runners-up: (Serbia) Nikola Ćaćić; (Austria) Lucas Miedler
- Score: 7–5, 6–3

Events
Singles	Doubles
← 2017 ·	Tilia Slovenia Open	· 2019 →

Hans Podlipnik Castillo and Andrei Vasilevski were the defending champions but chose not to defend their title.

Gerard Granollers and Lukáš Rosol won the title after defeating Nikola Ćaćić and Lucas Miedler 7–5, 6–3 in the final.

== Seeds ==
1. (Philippines) Ruben Gonzales / (United States) Nathaniel Lammons (quarterfinals)
2. (Argentina) Franco Agamenone / (Venezuela) Luis David Martínez (first round)
3. (Germany) Andre Begemann / (France) Albano Olivetti (semifinals)
4. (Kazakhstan) Timur Khabibulin / (Ukraine) Sergiy Stakhovsky (semifinals)

== Draw ==
=== Key ===
- Q = Qualifier
- WC = Wild card
- LL = Lucky loser
- Alt = Alternate
- SE = Special exempt
- PR = Protected ranking
- ITF = ITF entry
- JE = Junior exempt
- w/o = Walkover
- r = Retired
- d = Defaulted
- SR = Special ranking

First round

Quarterfinals

Semifinals

Final

1
- (Philippines) R Gonzales
- (United States) N Lammons
7
6

- (Turkey) A Çelikbilek
- (Turkey) C İlkel
5
3

1
- (Philippines) R Gonzales
- (United States) N Lammons
3
5

- (Portugal) B Saraiva
- (Netherlands) S Verbeek
3
2

- (Serbia) N Ćaćić
- (Austria) L Miedler
6
7

- (Serbia) N Ćaćić
- (Austria) L Miedler
6
6

- (Serbia) N Ćaćić
- (Austria) L Miedler
3
6
[10]

3
- (Germany) A Begemann
- (France) A Olivetti
7
6

3
- (Germany) A Begemann
- (France) A Olivetti
6
3
[4]

- (Sweden) M Eriksson
- (Sweden) A Göransson
5
4

3
- (Germany) A Begemann
- (France) A Olivetti
4
6
[10]

WC
(Slovenia) Aljaž Jakob Kaplja
(Sweden) Robert Kjellberg
1
4

- (Australia) D Propoggia
- (Australia) S Puodziunas
6
2
[4]

- (Australia) D Propoggia
- (Australia) S Puodziunas
6
6

- (Serbia) N Ćaćić
- (Austria) L Miedler
5
3

- (Russia) I Nedelko
- (Bosnia and Herzegovina) A Šetkić
4
4

- (Spain) G Granollers
- (Czech Republic) L Rosol
7
6

- (France) B Bonzi
- (Netherlands) M Vervoort
6
6

- (France) B Bonzi
- (Netherlands) M Vervoort
5
4

WC
- (Slovenia) T Kočevar-Dešman
- (Slovenia) N Razboršek
3
4

4
- (Kazakhstan) T Khabibulin
- (Ukraine) S Stakhovsky
7
6

4
- (Kazakhstan) T Khabibulin
- (Ukraine) S Stakhovsky
6
6

4
- (Kazakhstan) T Khabibulin
- (Ukraine) S Stakhovsky
1
1

- (Croatia) T Draganja
- (Croatia) N Serdarušić
7^{7}
4
[12]

- (Spain) G Granollers
- (Czech Republic) L Rosol
6
6

WC
- (Argentina) T Lipovšek Puches
- (Slovenia) A Radinski
6^{4}
6
[10]

- (Croatia) T Draganja
- (Croatia) N Serdarušić
4
4

- (Spain) G Granollers
- (Czech Republic) L Rosol
5
6
[10]

- (Spain) G Granollers
- (Czech Republic) L Rosol
6
6

2
- (Argentina) F Agamenone
- (Venezuela) LD Martínez
7
2
[4]
