= 2018 Tilia Slovenia Open – Singles =

Singles
- 2018 Tilia Slovenia Open

Final
- Champion: (France) Constant Lestienne
- Runner-up: (Italy) Andrea Arnaboldi
- Score: 6–2, 6–1

Events
Singles	Doubles
← 2017 ·	Tilia Slovenia Open	· 2019 →

Sergiy Stakhovsky was the defending champion but lost in the quarterfinals to Constant Lestienne.

Lestienne won the title after defeating Andrea Arnaboldi 6–2, 6–1 in the final.

== Seeds ==
1. (Ukraine) Sergiy Stakhovsky (quarterfinals)
2. (Austria) Dennis Novak (first round)
3. (Spain) Adrián Menéndez Maceiras (semifinals)
4. (Italy) Gianluigi Quinzi (first round)
5. (Italy) Salvatore Caruso (quarterfinals)
6. (Italy) Luca Vanni (second round)
7. (Croatia) Nino Serdarušić (second round)
8. (Italy) Andrea Arnaboldi (final)

== Draw ==
=== Key ===
- Q = Qualifier
- WC = Wild card
- LL = Lucky loser
- Alt = Alternate
- SE = Special exempt
- PR = Protected ranking
- ITF = ITF entry
- JE = Junior exempt
- w/o = Walkover
- r = Retired
- d = Defaulted
- SR = Special ranking

=== Finals ===
Semifinals
(France) Constant Lestienne	6	6
(Germany) Dominik Köpfer	3	2
3	(Spain) Adrián Menéndez Maceiras	6^{4}	5
8	(Italy) Andrea Arnaboldi	7^{7}	7

Final
(France) Constant Lestienne	6	6
8	(Italy) Andrea Arnaboldi	2	1

=== Top half ===
First round
1	(Ukraine) S Stakhovsky	4	6	6
LL	(Belgium) Christopher Heyman	6	3	3
Q	(Turkey) A Çelikbilek	6	6
WC	(Slovenia) Aljaž Jakob Kaplja	0	1
(France) C Lestienne	6	6
(Italy) F Gaio	3	2
(Czech Republic) V Šafránek	6^{5}	2
7	(Croatia) N Serdarušić	7^{7}	6
4	(Italy) G Quinzi	3	7^{7}	5
(Italy) GM Moroni	6	6^{3}	7
(Czech Republic) L Rosol	3	5
(Turkey) C İlkel	6	7
WC	(Slovenia) N Razboršek	7^{7}	5	6^{4}
(Germany) D Köpfer	6^{3}	7	7^{7}
(Italy) F Baldi	7^{7}	3	4
6	(Italy) L Vanni	6^{5}	6	6

Second round
1	(Ukraine) S Stakhovsky	7^{7}	6
Q	(Turkey) A Çelikbilek	6^{2}	2
(France) C Lestienne	6	6
7	(Croatia) N Serdarušić	4	2
(Italy) GM Moroni	6	6
(Turkey) C İlkel	1	1
(Germany) D Köpfer	4	6	7
6	(Italy) L Vanni	6	1	5

Quarterfinals
1	(Ukraine) S Stakhovsky	6	2	1
(France) C Lestienne	3	6	6
(Italy) GM Moroni	4	6	1
(Germany) D Köpfer	6	3	6

Semifinals
(France) C Lestienne	6	6
(Germany) D Köpfer	3	2

=== Bottom half ===
First round
5	(Italy) S Caruso	6	6
Q	(Russia) A Karatsev	3	3
Q	(Sweden) M Eriksson	6	6^{6}	6
(Croatia) V Galović	4	7^{8}	4
(Austria) L Miedler	6	6
Q	(Denmark) F Nielsen	3	2
(Russia) I Nedelko	2^{r}
3	(Spain) A Menéndez Maceiras	4
8	(Italy) A Arnaboldi	6	7^{7}
WC	(Slovenia) T Kočevar-Dešman	0	6^{2}
(Germany) T Kamke	6	6
WC	(Slovenia) A Radinski	0	2
SE	(Russia) P Kotov	6	6
(France) B Bonzi	4	3
(Bosnia and Herzegovina) A Šetkić	6	6
2	(Austria) D Novak	4	2

Second round
5	(Italy) S Caruso	4	6	7
Q	(Sweden) M Eriksson	6	3	5
(Austria) L Miedler	6	3	3
3	(Spain) A Menéndez Maceiras	4	6	6
8	(Italy) A Arnaboldi	6	1	6
(Germany) T Kamke	2	6	4
SE	(Russia) P Kotov	3	1
(Bosnia and Herzegovina) A Šetkić	6	6

Quarterfinals
5	(Italy) S Caruso	2	5
3	(Spain) A Menéndez Maceiras	6	7
8	(Italy) A Arnaboldi	6	6
(Bosnia and Herzegovina) A Šetkić	2	4

Semifinals
3	(Spain) A Menéndez Maceiras	6^{4}	5
8	(Italy) A Arnaboldi	7^{7}	7
