= 2015 Tilia Slovenia Open – Singles =

Singles
- 2015 Tilia Slovenia Open

Final
- Champion: (Italy) Luca Vanni
- Runner-up: (Slovenia) Grega Žemlja
- Score: 6–3, 7–6^{(8–6)}

Events
Singles	Doubles
← 2014 ·	Tilia Slovenia Open	· 2016 →

Blaž Kavčič was the defending champion, but chose not to compete.

Luca Vanni won the tournament, defeating Grega Žemlja in the final, 6–3, 7–6^{(8–6)}.

== Seeds ==
1. (Spain) Marcel Granollers (first round)
2. (Italy) Paolo Lorenzi (quarterfinals)
3. (Belgium) Kimmer Coppejans (first round)
4. (Slovakia) Lukáš Lacko (second round)
5. (Slovakia) Norbert Gombos (semifinals)
6. (Italy) Luca Vanni (champion)
7. (Netherlands) Thiemo de Bakker (second round)
8. (Bosnia and Herzegovina) Mirza Bašić (quarterfinals)

== Draw ==
=== Key ===
- Q = Qualifier
- WC = Wild card
- LL = Lucky loser
- Alt = Alternate
- SE = Special exempt
- PR = Protected ranking
- ITF = ITF entry
- JE = Junior exempt
- w/o = Walkover
- r = Retired
- d = Defaulted
- SR = Special ranking

=== Finals ===
Semifinals
5	(Slovakia) Norbert Gombos	7	4	3
6	(Italy) Luca Vanni	5	6	6
WC	(Slovenia) Grega Žemlja	6	6
(Russia) Alexander Kudryavtsev	4	2

Final
6	(Italy) Luca Vanni	6	7^{8}
WC	(Slovenia) Grega Žemlja	3	6^{6}

=== Top half ===
First round
1	(Spain) M Granollers	6^{4}	2
(Russia) E Donskoy	7^{7}	6
(France) C Hemery	6	5	6
Q	(Italy) Edoardo Eremin	3	7	3
(Germany) P Gojowczyk	3	6	6
(Serbia) L Djere	6	3	2
(Russia) K Kravchuk	1	6	6^{4}
5	(Slovakia) N Gombos	6	4	7^{7}
3	(Belgium) K Coppejans	1	2
LL	(France) J Eysseric	6	6
(Japan) H Moriya	1	1
WC	(Slovenia) A Radinski	6	6
(Belgium) N Desein	1	0^{r}
(Belgium) G Gigounon	6	1
(Russia) A Karatsev	3	2
6	(Italy) L Vanni	6	6

Second round
(Russia) E Donskoy	6	3	6
(France) C Hemery	4	6	3
(Germany) P Gojowczyk	4	3
5	(Slovakia) N Gombos	6	6
LL	(France) J Eysseric	6^{2}	3
WC	(Slovenia) A Radinski	7^{7}	6
(Belgium) G Gigounon	1	3
6	(Italy) L Vanni	6	6

Quarterfinals
(Russia) E Donskoy	6	2	3
5	(Slovakia) N Gombos	2	6	6
WC	(Slovenia) A Radinski	2	0
6	(Italy) L Vanni	6	6

Semifinals
5	(Slovakia) N Gombos	7	4	3
6	(Italy) L Vanni	5	6	6

=== Bottom half ===
First round
8	(Bosnia and Herzegovina) M Bašić	6	2	6
(Italy) M Viola	2	6	4
(Slovakia) J Kovalík	3	2
WC	(Turkey) C İlkel	6	6
WC	(Slovenia) G Žemlja	6	5	6
(Italy) A Arnaboldi	4	7	1
WC	(Slovenia) Aljaž Jakob Kaplja	2	1
4	(Slovakia) L Lacko	6	6
7	(Netherlands) T de Bakker	7	6
Q	(United Kingdom) J Milton	5	3
(Russia) A Kudryavtsev	7^{8}	6
Q	(Italy) R Ghedin	6^{6}	3
Q	(Chile) C Garin	5	6	5
Alt	(France) D Guez	7	2	7
(Bosnia and Herzegovina) A Šetkić	7^{9}	1	3
2	(Italy) P Lorenzi	6^{7}	6	6

Second round
8	(Bosnia and Herzegovina) M Bašić	6	6
WC	(Turkey) C İlkel	2	2
WC	(Slovenia) G Žemlja	6	6
4	(Slovakia) L Lacko	0	2
7	(Netherlands) T de Bakker	7^{7}	2	2
(Russia) A Kudryavtsev	6^{3}	6	6
Alt	(France) D Guez	3	4
2	(Italy) P Lorenzi	6	6

Quarterfinals
8	(Bosnia and Herzegovina) M Bašić	7^{7}	5	3
WC	(Slovenia) G Žemlja	6^{5}	7	6
(Russia) A Kudryavtsev	6	1	6
2	(Italy) P Lorenzi	4	6	1

Semifinals
WC	(Slovenia) G Žemlja	6	6
(Russia) A Kudryavtsev	4	2
