= 2019 Tilia Slovenia Open =

- Date: 12–18 August
- Edition: 7th
- Surface: Hard
- Location: Portorož, Slovenia

Champions

Singles
- (Slovenia) Aljaž Bedene

Doubles
- (Russia) Teymuraz Gabashvili / (Spain) Carlos Gómez-Herrera
| ← 2018 · | Tilia Slovenia Open | · 2020 → |

The 2019 Tilia Slovenia Open was a professional tennis tournament played on hard courts. It was the seventh edition of the tournament which was part of the 2019 ATP Challenger Tour. It took place in Portorož, Slovenia between 12 – 18 August 2019.

== Singles main-draw entrants ==
=== Seeds ===
| Country | Player | Rank^{1} | Seed |
|---|---|---|---|
| SLO | Aljaž Bedene | 91 | 1 |
| ~~ITA~~ | ~~Lorenzo Giustino~~ | ~~130~~ | ~~2~~ |
| SLO | Blaž Rola | 139 | 3 |
| UKR | Sergiy Stakhovsky | 142 | 4 |
| SVK | Filip Horanský | 162 | 5 |
| FRA | Constant Lestienne | 180 | 6 |
| RUS | Alexey Vatutin | 193 | 7 |
| RUS | Roman Safiullin | 219 | 8 |
| ITA | Matteo Viola | 245 | 9 |
| RUS | Evgeny Karlovskiy | 246 | 10 |
| SRB | Danilo Petrović | 247 | 11 |
| AUT | Lucas Miedler | 253 | 12 |
| CZE | Zdeněk Kolář | 284 | 13 |
| FRA | Kenny de Schepper | 288 | 14 |
| ITA | Luca Vanni | 291 | 15 |
| IND | Sasikumar Mukund | 292 | 16 |

- ^{1} Rankings are as of 5 August 2019.

=== Other entrants ===
The following players received wildcards into the singles main draw:

- (Slovenia) Tom Kočevar-Dešman
- (Slovenia) Sven Lah
- (Croatia) Zvonimir Orešković
- (Slovenia) Nik Razboršek
- (Slovenia) Mike Urbanija

The following players received entry into the singles main draw as alternates:

- (Russia) Artem Dubrivnyy
- (Kazakhstan) Andrey Golubev

The following players received entry into the singles main draw using their ITF World Tennis Ranking:

- (Argentina) Tomás Martín Etcheverry
- (France) Maxime Hamou
- (France) Tom Jomby
- (France) Quentin Robert
- (Argentina) Matías Zukas

The following players received entry from the qualifying draw:

- (Colombia) Nicolás Barrientos
- (Slovenia) Tomás Lipovšek Puches

== Champions ==
=== Singles ===
- (Slovenia) Aljaž Bedene def. (Norway) Viktor Durasovic 7–5, 6–3.

=== Doubles ===
- (Russia) Teymuraz Gabashvili / (Spain) Carlos Gómez-Herrera def. (Austria) Lucas Miedler / (Austria) Tristan-Samuel Weissborn 6–3, 6–2.
