= 2015 Tilia Slovenia Open =

- Date: 10–15 August
- Edition: 3rd
- Surface: Hard
- Location: Portorož, Slovenia

Champions

Singles
- (Italy) Luca Vanni

Doubles
- (France) Fabrice Martin / (India) Purav Raja
← 2014 ·	Tilia Slovenia Open	· 2016 →

The 2015 Tilia Slovenia Open was a professional tennis tournament played on hard courts. It was the third edition of the tournament which was part of the 2015 ATP Challenger Tour. It took place in Portorož, Slovenia between 10 – 15 August 2015.

== Singles main-draw entrants ==
=== Seeds ===
Country	Player	Rank^{1}	Seed
ESP	Marcel Granollers	74	1
ITA	Paolo Lorenzi	87	2
BEL	Kimmer Coppejans	103	3
SVK	Lukáš Lacko	117	4
SVK	Norbert Gombos	126	5
ITA	Luca Vanni	140	6
NED	Thiemo de Bakker	141	7
BIH	Mirza Bašić	152	8

- ^{1} Rankings are as of August 3, 2015.

=== Other entrants ===
The following players received wildcards into the singles main draw:

- (Turkey) Cem İlkel
- (Slovenia) Aljaž Jakob Kaplja
- (Slovenia) Aljaž Radinski
- (Slovenia) Grega Žemlja

The following player entered the singles main draw as an alternate:

- (France) David Guez

The following players received entry from the qualifying draw:

- (Italy) Riccardo Ghedin
- (Chile) Cristian Garín
- (United Kingdom) Joshua Milton
- (Italy) Edoardo Eremin

The following player entered the singles main draw as a lucky looser:

- (France) Jonathan Eysseric

== Champions ==
=== Singles ===
- (Italy) Luca Vanni d. (Slovenia) Grega Žemlja 6–3, 7–6^{(8–6)}

=== Doubles ===
- (France) Fabrice Martin / (India) Purav Raja d. (Belarus) Aliaksandr Bury / (Sweden) Andreas Siljeström 7–6^{(7–5)}, 4–6, [18–16]
