= 2019 Tilia Slovenia Open – Singles =

Singles
- 2019 Tilia Slovenia Open

Final
- Champion: (Slovenia) Aljaž Bedene
- Runner-up: (Norway) Viktor Durasovic
- Score: 7–5, 6–3

Events
Singles	Doubles
← 2018 ·	Tilia Slovenia Open	· 2020 →

Constant Lestienne was the defending champion but lost in the semifinals to Viktor Durasovic.

Aljaž Bedene won the title after defeating Durasovic 7–5, 6–3 in the final.

== Seeds ==
All seeds receive a bye into the second round.

1. (Slovenia) Aljaž Bedene (champion)
2. (Italy) Lorenzo Giustino (withdrew)
3. (Slovenia) Blaž Rola (semifinals)
4. (Ukraine) Sergiy Stakhovsky (third round)
5. (Slovakia) Filip Horanský (third round)
6. (France) Constant Lestienne (semifinals)
7. (Russia) Alexey Vatutin (second round)
8. (Russia) Roman Safiullin (quarterfinals)
9. (Italy) Matteo Viola (third round)
10. (Russia) Evgeny Karlovskiy (second round)
11. (Serbia) Danilo Petrović (second round)
12. (Austria) Lucas Miedler (second round)
13. (Czech Republic) Zdeněk Kolář (quarterfinals)
14. (France) Kenny de Schepper (second round, retired)
15. (Italy) Luca Vanni (second round)
16. (India) Sasikumar Mukund (third round)

== Draw ==
=== Key ===
- Q = Qualifier
- WC = Wild card
- LL = Lucky loser
- Alt = Alternate
- SE = Special exempt
- PR = Protected ranking
- ITF = ITF entry
- JE = Junior exempt
- w/o = Walkover
- r = Retired
- d = Defaulted
- SR = Special ranking

=== Finals ===
Quarterfinals
1	(Slovenia) Aljaž Bedene	6	4	7^{7}
(Slovakia) Lukáš Klein	3	6	6^{4}
3	(Slovenia) Blaž Rola	6	6
8	(Russia) Roman Safiullin	2	1
(Norway) Viktor Durasovic	6	7^{8}
13	(Czech Republic) Zdeněk Kolář	4	6^{6}
6	(France) Constant Lestienne	6	3
Alt	(Russia) Artem Dubrivnyy	4	0^{r}

Semifinals
1	(Slovenia) Aljaž Bedene	6	6
3	(Slovenia) Blaž Rola	3	2
(Norway) Viktor Durasovic	3	6	6
6	(France) Constant Lestienne	6	1	1

Final
1	(Slovenia) Aljaž Bedene	7	6
(Norway) Viktor Durasovic	5	3

=== Top half ===
==== Section 1 ====
First round
(Monaco) H Nys	4	2
(Ukraine) I Marchenko	6	6
(United States) E King	7	1
(Monaco) L Catarina	5	0^{r}
(Italy) A Vavassori	4	1
(Slovakia) L Klein	6	6
ITF	(Argentina) TM Etcheverry	6^{0}	6	6
(Austria) J Rodionov	7^{7}	2	2

Second round
1	(Slovenia) A Bedene	5	6	6
(Ukraine) I Marchenko	7	4	2
(United States) E King	6	5	3
16	(India) S Mukund	4	7	6
11	(Serbia) D Petrović	3	4
(Slovakia) L Kleinn	6	6
ITF	(Argentina) TM Etcheverry	6^{3}	1
5	(Slovakia) F Horanský	7^{7}	6

Third round
1	(Slovenia) A Bedene	6	6
16	(India) S Mukund	2	2
(Slovakia) L Klein	1	6	6
5	(Slovakia) F Horanský	6	4	3

Quarterfinals
1	(Slovenia) A Bedene	6	4	7^{7}
(Slovakia) L Klein	3	6	6^{4}

==== Section 2 ====
First round
(Russia) T Gabashvili	4	6	6
(Israel) E Leshem	6	1	0
(Bosnia and Herzegovina) A Šetkić	6	6
WC	(Slovenia) Sven Lah	4	3
(Netherlands) I Sijsling	2	3
(Spain) C Gómez-Herrera	6	6
WC	(Slovenia) N Razboršek	4	6	4
(France) Antoine Cornut-Chauvinc	6	3	6

Second round
3	(Slovenia) B Rola	7	6
(Russia) T Gabashvili	5	2
(Bosnia and Herzegovina) A Šetkić	1
14	(France) K de Schepper	4^{r}
10	(Russia) E Karlovskiy	1	2
(Spain) C Gómez-Herrera	6	6
(France) A Cornut-Chauvinc	7^{7}	4	2
8	(Russia) R Safiullin	6^{4}	6	6

Third round
3	(Slovenia) B Rola	6	6
(Bosnia and Herzegovina) A Šetkić	1	4
(Spain) C Gómez-Herrera	2	4
8	(Russia) R Safiullin	6	6

Quarterfinals
3	(Slovenia) B Rola	6	6
8	(Russia) R Safiullin	2	1

=== Bottom half ===
==== Section 3 ====
First round
ITF	(France) M Hamou	4	1
(Turkey) A Çelikbilek	6	6
Q	(Colombia) N Barrientos	2	6	1
(Norway) V Durasovic	6	3	6
ITF	(France) Quentin Robert	3	5
(Germany) Tobias Simon	6	7
ITF	(France) Tom Jomby	3	0
(Italy) A Bega	6	6

Second round
7	(Russia) A Vatutin	6^{2}	3
(Turkey) A Çelikbilek	7^{7}	6
(Norway) V Durasovic	7	6
12	(Austria) L Miedler	5	3
13	(Czech Republic) Z Kolář	6	6
(Germany) T Simon	2	4
(Italy) A Bega	1	5
4	(Ukraine) S Stakhovsky	6	7

Third round
(Turkey) A Çelikbilek	3	2
(Norway) V Durasovic	6	6
13	(Czech Republic) Z Kolář	6	3	6
4	(Ukraine) S Stakhovsky	2	6	3

Quarterfinals
(Norway) V Durasovic	6	7^{8}
13	(Czech Republic) Z Kolář	4	6^{6}

==== Section 4 ====
First round
ITF	(Argentina) Matías Zukas	6	1	6^{5}
(Italy) J Ocleppo	2	6	7^{7}
WC	(Slovenia) T Kočevar-Dešman	6	6^{6}	3
(Serbia) M Zekić	4	7^{8}	6
Alt	(Russia) A Dubrivnyy	6	6
WC	(Slovenia) M Urbanija	3	4
WC	(Croatia) Zvonimir Orešković	1	0
Q	(Slovenia) T Lipovšek Puches	6	6

Second round
6	(France) C Lestienne	6	6
(Italy) J Ocleppo	1	2
(Serbia) M Zekić	0	3
9	(Italy) M Viola	6	6
15	(Italy) L Vanni	6^{6}	6	4
Alt	(Russia) A Dubrivnyy	7^{8}	4	6
Q	(Slovenia) T Lipovšek Puches	6	6
Alt	(Kazakhstan) A Golubev	4	4

Third round
6	(France) C Lestienne	6	6
9	(Italy) M Viola	0	1
Alt	(Russia) A Dubrivnyy	7^{7}	6
Q	(Slovenia) T Lipovšek Puches	6^{2}	3

Quarterfinals
6	(France) C Lestienne	6	3
Alt	(Russia) A Dubrivnyy	4	0^{r}
