= 2017 Tilia Slovenia Open – Singles =

Singles
- 2017 Tilia Slovenia Open

Final
- Champion: (Ukraine) Sergiy Stakhovsky
- Runner-up: (Italy) Matteo Berrettini
- Score: 6–7^{(4–7)}, 7–6^{(8–6)}, 6–3

Events
Singles	Doubles
← 2016 ·	Tilia Slovenia Open	· 2018 →

Florian Mayer was the defending champion but chose not to defend his title.

Sergiy Stakhovsky won the title after defeating Matteo Berrettini 6–7^{(4–7)}, 7–6^{(8–6)}, 6–3 in the final.

== Seeds ==
1. (Slovenia) Blaž Kavčič (second round)
2. (Germany) Peter Gojowczyk (first round, retired)
3. (Ukraine) Sergiy Stakhovsky (champion)
4. (Slovakia) Lukáš Lacko (first round, retired)
5. (Belarus) Egor Gerasimov (first round)
6. (Serbia) Filip Krajinović (quarterfinals)
7. (Spain) Adrián Menéndez Maceiras (second round)
8. (Slovakia) Jozef Kovalík (first round)

== Draw ==
=== Key ===
- Q = Qualifier
- WC = Wild card
- LL = Lucky loser
- Alt = Alternate
- SE = Special exempt
- PR = Protected ranking
- ITF = ITF entry
- JE = Junior exempt
- w/o = Walkover
- r = Retired
- d = Defaulted
- SR = Special ranking

=== Finals ===
Semifinals
(Bosnia and Herzegovina) Aldin Šetkić	2	4
(Italy) Matteo Berrettini	6	6
3	(Ukraine) Sergiy Stakhovsky	4	6	7
(Greece) Stefanos Tsitsipas	6	4	5

Final
(Italy) Matteo Berrettini	7^{7}	6^{6}	3
3	(Ukraine) Sergiy Stakhovsky	6^{4}	7^{8}	6

=== Top half ===
First round
1	(Slovenia) B Kavčič	6	6
Q	(Russia) E Karlovskiy	4	4
WC	(Slovenia) T Kočevar-Dešman	2	7^{7}	4
(Bosnia and Herzegovina) A Šetkić	6	6^{4}	6
Q	(Montenegro) Lj Čelebić	3	3
(Spain) R Ortega Olmedo	6	6
(Spain) P Martínez	1	6	7
8	(Slovakia) J Kovalík	6	3	5
4	(Slovakia) L Lacko	4	0^{r}
WC	(Spain) Jaime Fermosell Delgado	6	3
(Kazakhstan) D Popko	3	3
(Belarus) I Ivashka	6	6
(Italy) L Giustino	6	3	4
(Italy) M Berrettini	3	6	6
(Hungary) A Balázs	5	0
7	(Spain) A Menéndez Maceiras	7	6

Second round
1	(Slovenia) B Kavčič	3	6^{6}
(Bosnia and Herzegovina) A Šetkić	6	7^{8}
(Spain) R Ortega Olmedo	6	0	3
(Spain) P Martínez	4	6	6
WC	(Spain) J Fermosell Delgado	3	2
(Belarus) I Ivashka	6	6
(Italy) M Berrettini	7^{8}	6
7	(Spain) A Menéndez Maceiras	6^{6}	1

Quarterfinals
(Bosnia and Herzegovina) A Šetkić	6^{4}	6	6
(Spain) P Martínez	7^{7}	4	4
(Belarus) I Ivashka	4	4
(Italy) M Berrettini	6	6

Semifinals
(Bosnia and Herzegovina) A Šetkić	2	4
(Italy) M Berrettini	6	6

=== Bottom half ===
First round
6	(Serbia) F Krajinović	6	6
(Czech Republic) L Rosol	4	2
(Slovenia) G Žemlja	6	6
WC	(Slovenia) Grega Boh	1	2
Q	(France) A Olivetti	6	6
SE	(Spain) G Granollers	4	3
Alt	(Italy) M Viola	6^{3}	2
3	(Ukraine) S Stakhovsky	7^{7}	6
5	(Belarus) E Gerasimov	5	3
(Italy) L Vanni	7	6
(Australia) A de Minaur	2	3
(Greece) S Tsitsipas	6	6
WC	(Slovenia) Sven Lah	6	6
(Spain) R Ramírez Hidalgo	4	4
Q	(Croatia) F Škugor	6	3
2	(Germany) P Gojowczyk	3	1^{r}

Second round
6	(Serbia) F Krajinović	6	6
(Slovenia) G Žemlja	2	3
Q	(France) A Olivetti	2	2
3	(Ukraine) S Stakhovsky	6	6
(Italy) L Vanni	6	3	4
(Greece) S Tsitsipas	3	6	6
WC	(Slovenia) S Lah	6^{2}	3
Q	(Croatia) F Škugor	7^{7}	6

Quarterfinals
6	(Serbia) F Krajinović	1	6	3
3	(Ukraine) S Stakhovsky	6	3	6
(Greece) S Tsitsipas	7^{7}	7^{8}
Q	(Croatia) F Škugor	6^{3}	6^{6}

Semifinals
3	(Ukraine) S Stakhovsky	4	6	7
(Greece) S Tsitsipas	6	4	5
