= 2016 Tilia Slovenia Open – Singles =

Singles
- 2016 Tilia Slovenia Open

Final
- Champion: (Germany) Florian Mayer
- Runner-up: (Russia) Daniil Medvedev
- Score: 6–1, 6–2

Events
Singles	Doubles
← 2015 ·	Tilia Slovenia Open	· 2017 →

Luca Vanni was the defending champion but chose not to defend his title.

Florian Mayer won the title after defeating Daniil Medvedev 6–1, 6–2 in the final.

== Seeds ==
1. (Germany) Florian Mayer (champion)
2. (Argentina) Renzo Olivo (quarterfinals)
3. (Slovakia) Jozef Kovalík (second round)
4. (Slovenia) Grega Žemlja (semifinals)
5. (Germany) Peter Gojowczyk (withdrew)
6. (Hungary) Márton Fucsovics (quarterfinals)
7. (Russia) Alexander Kudryavtsev (semifinals)
8. (Belgium) Ruben Bemelmans (second round)

== Draw ==
=== Key ===
- Q = Qualifier
- WC = Wild card
- LL = Lucky loser
- Alt = Alternate
- SE = Special exempt
- PR = Protected ranking
- ITF = ITF entry
- JE = Junior exempt
- w/o = Walkover
- r = Retired
- d = Defaulted
- SR = Special ranking

=== Finals ===
Semifinals
1	(Germany) Florian Mayer	6	6
4	(Slovenia) Grega Žemlja	2	2
(Russia) Daniil Medvedev	6^{4}	6	6
7	(Russia) Alexander Kudryavtsev	7^{7}	2	4

Final
1	(Germany) Florian Mayer	6	6
(Russia) Daniil Medvedev	1	2

=== Top half ===
First round
1	(Germany) F Mayer	6	1	7
(France) D Guez	4	6	5
(Bosnia and Herzegovina) A Šetkić	3	6	7^{7}
(Kazakhstan) D Popko	6	2	6^{3}
WC	(Slovenia) T Kočevar-Dešman	2	4
(Spain) A Menéndez Maceiras	6	6
(Serbia) M Zekić	6	6
LL	(France) A Olivetti	3	4
4	(Slovenia) G Žemlja	6	4
(France) A Sidorenko	1	1^{r}
Q	(Ukraine) Vadym Ursu	0	2
(Belgium) Y Mertens	6	6
(Serbia) M Tepavac	6	6
Q	(United Kingdom) D Cox	4	3
(Czech Republic) J Mertl	6	1	1
8	(Belgium) R Bemelmans	4	6	6

Second round
1	(Germany) F Mayer	6	6
(Bosnia and Herzegovina) A Šetkić	4	3
(Spain) A Menéndez Maceiras	6	6
(Serbia) M Zekić	3	3
4	(Slovenia) G Žemlja	6	6
(Belgium) Y Mertens	4	2
(Serbia) M Tepavac	6	6
8	(Belgium) R Bemelmans	3	4

Quarterfinals
1	(Germany) F Mayer	6	6
(Spain) A Menéndez Maceiras	0	3
4	(Slovenia) G Žemlja	6	7^{7}
(Serbia) M Tepavac	4	6^{1}

Semifinals
1	(Germany) F Mayer	6	6
4	(Slovenia) G Žemlja	2	2

=== Bottom half ===
First round
6	(Hungary) M Fucsovics	4	6	6
WC	(Germany) Y Maden	6	3	3
(Czech Republic) Michal Konečný	4	1
WC	(Slovenia) B Kavčič	6	6
Q	(Turkey) C İlkel	3	0
(Russia) D Medvedev	6	6
(Italy) A Bega	1	1
3	(Slovakia) J Kovalík	6	6
7	(Russia) A Kudryavtsev	6	6
Q	(Israel) E Leshem	4	3
(Egypt) M Safwat	3	4
(Belarus) I Ivashka	6	6
(Turkey) M İlhan	3	2
(Slovenia) B Rola	6	6
WC	(Slovenia) Sven Lah	2	3
2	(Argentina) R Olivo	6	6

Second round
6	(Hungary) M Fucsovics	6^{3}	7	6
WC	(Slovenia) B Kavčič	7^{7}	5	4
(Russia) D Medvedev	6	6
3	(Slovakia) J Kovalík	3	3
7	(Russia) A Kudryavtsev	6	6
(Belarus) I Ivashka	3	3
(Slovenia) B Rola	7^{7}	6^{8}	6^{4}
2	(Argentina) R Olivo	6^{2}	7^{10}	7^{7}

Quarterfinals
6	(Hungary) M Fucsovics	3	2
(Russia) D Medvedev	6	6
7	(Russia) A Kudryavtsev	6	6
2	(Argentina) R Olivo	2	4

Semifinals
(Russia) D Medvedev	6^{4}	6	6
7	(Russia) A Kudryavtsev	7^{7}	2	4
