= 2017 Tilia Slovenia Open =

- Date: 7–12 August
- Edition: 5th
- Surface: Hard
- Location: Portorož, Slovenia

Champions

Singles
- (Ukraine) Sergiy Stakhovsky

Doubles
- (Chile) Hans Podlipnik Castillo / (Belarus) Andrei Vasilevski
← 2016 ·	Tilia Slovenia Open	· 2018 →

The 2017 Tilia Slovenia Open was a professional tennis tournament played on hard courts. It was the fifth edition of the tournament which was part of the 2017 ATP Challenger Tour. It took place in Portorož, Slovenia between 7 – 12 August 2017.

== Singles main-draw entrants ==
=== Seeds ===
Country	Player	Rank^{1}	Seed
SLO	Blaž Kavčič	84	1
GER	Peter Gojowczyk	104	2
UKR	Sergiy Stakhovsky	113	3
SVK	Lukáš Lacko	119	4
BLR	Egor Gerasimov	121	5
SRB	Filip Krajinović	140	6
ESP	Adrián Menéndez Maceiras	145	7
SVK	Jozef Kovalík	152	8

- ^{1} Rankings are as of 31 July 2017.

=== Other entrants ===
The following players received wildcards into the singles main draw:

- (Slovenia) Grega Boh
- (Spain) Jaime Fermosell Delgado
- (Slovenia) Tom Kočevar-Dešman
- (Slovenia) Sven Lah

The following player received entry into the singles main draw as a special exempt:

- (Spain) Gerard Granollers

The following player received entry into the singles main draw as an alternate:

- (Italy) Matteo Viola

The following players received entry from the qualifying draw:

- (Montenegro) Ljubomir Čelebić
- (Russia) Evgeny Karlovskiy
- (France) Albano Olivetti
- (Croatia) Franko Škugor

== Champions ==
=== Singles ===
- (Ukraine) Sergiy Stakhovsky def. (Italy) Matteo Berrettini 6–7^{(4–7)}, 7–6^{(8–6)}, 6–3.

=== Doubles ===
- (Chile) Hans Podlipnik Castillo / (Belarus) Andrei Vasilevski def. (Czech Republic) Lukáš Rosol / (Croatia) Franko Škugor 6–3, 7–6^{(7–4)}.
