= 2016 Tilia Slovenia Open =

- Date: 8–13 August
- Edition: 4th
- Surface: Hard
- Location: Portorož, Slovenia

Champions

Singles
- (Germany) Florian Mayer

Doubles
- (Belarus) Sergey Betov / (Belarus) Ilya Ivashka
← 2015 ·	Tilia Slovenia Open	· 2017 →

The 2016 Tilia Slovenia Open was a professional tennis tournament played on hard courts. It was the fourth edition of the tournament which was part of the 2016 ATP Challenger Tour. It took place in Portorož, Slovenia between 8 – 13 August 2016.

== Singles main-draw entrants ==
=== Seeds ===
Country	Player	Rank^{1}	Seed
GER	Florian Mayer	98	1
ARG	Renzo Olivo	110	2
SVK	Jozef Kovalík	125	3
SLO	Grega Žemlja	142	4
GER	~~Peter Gojowczyk~~	~~151~~	~~5~~
HUN	Márton Fucsovics	160	6
RUS	Alexander Kudryavtsev	169	7
BEL	Ruben Bemelmans	170	8

- ^{1} Rankings are as of August 1, 2016.

=== Other entrants ===
The following players received wildcards into the singles main draw:

- (Slovenia) Tom Kočevar-Dešman
- (Germany) Yannick Maden
- (Slovenia) Blaž Kavčič
- (Slovenia) Sven Lah

The following players received entry from the qualifying draw:

- (United Kingdom) Daniel Cox
- (Turkey) Cem İlkel
- (Israel) Edan Leshem
- (Ukraine) Vadym Ursu

The following player received entry as a lucky loser:

- (France) Albano Olivetti

== Champions ==
=== Singles ===
- (Germany) Florian Mayer def. (Russia) Daniil Medvedev, 6–1, 6–2

=== Doubles ===
- (Belarus) Sergey Betov / (Belarus) Ilya Ivashka def. (Croatia) Tomislav Draganja / (Croatia) Nino Serdarušić, 1–6, 6–3, [10–4]
