= 2015 Brasil Open =

- Date: February 9 – 15
- Edition: 15th
- Category: ATP World Tour 250
- Draw: 28S / 16D
- Prize money: $505,655
- Surface: Clay - indoor
- Location: São Paulo, Brazil

Champions

Singles
- (Uruguay) Pablo Cuevas

Doubles
- (Colombia) Juan Sebastián Cabal / (Colombia) Robert Farah
- Brasil Open

The 2015 Brasil Open was a men's tennis tournament played on indoor clay courts. It was the 15th edition of the event known as the Brasil Open, and was part of the ATP World Tour 250 series of the 2015 ATP World Tour. It took place from February 9 through February 15, 2015, in São Paulo, Brazil. Fifth-seeded Pablo Cuevas won the singles title.

== Finals ==
=== Singles ===
- (Uruguay) Pablo Cuevas defeated (Italy) Luca Vanni, 6–4, 3–6, 7–6^{(7–4)}

=== Doubles ===
- (Colombia) Juan Sebastián Cabal / (Colombia) Robert Farah defeated (Italy) Paolo Lorenzi / (Argentina) Diego Schwartzman, 6–4, 6–2

== Singles main-draw entrants ==
=== Seeds ===
Country	Player	Ranking^{1}	Seed
~~ESP~~	~~Feliciano López~~	~~14~~	~~1~~
ESP	Tommy Robredo	17	2
ITA	Fabio Fognini	22	3
ARG	Leonardo Mayer	26	4
URU	Pablo Cuevas	30	5
COL	Santiago Giraldo	31	6
ESP	Fernando Verdasco	32	7
SVK	Martin Kližan	38	8

- ^{1} Rankings as of February 2, 2015.

=== Other entrants ===
The following players received wildcards into the main draw:

- (Brazil) Guilherme Clezar
- (Belgium) Kimmer Coppejans
- (Brazil) João Souza

The following players received entry from the qualifying draw:

- (Netherlands) Thiemo de Bakker
- (Argentina) Máximo González
- (Argentina) Guido Pella
- (Italy) Luca Vanni

The following player received entry as a lucky loser:

- (Argentina) Facundo Bagnis

=== Withdrawals ===
Before the tournament

- (Spain) Feliciano López → replaced by Facundo Bagnis

=== Retirements ===
- (Argentina) Facundo Bagnis

== Doubles main-draw entrants ==
=== Seeds ===
Country	Player	Country	Player	Rank^{1}	Seed
AUT	Alexander Peya	BRA	Bruno Soares	22	1
COL	Juan Sebastián Cabal	COL	Robert Farah	42	2
AUT	Julian Knowle	BRA	Marcelo Melo	48	3
URU	Pablo Cuevas	ESP	David Marrero	67	4

- ^{1} Rankings are as of February 2, 2015.

=== Other entrants ===
The following pairs received wildcards into the main draw:

- (Brazil) Marcelo Demoliner / (Brazil) Rogério Dutra Silva
- (Brazil) André Sá / (Brazil) João Souza
