= 2015 Tilia Slovenia Open – Doubles =

Doubles
- 2015 Tilia Slovenia Open

Final
- Champion: (France) Fabrice Martin (India) Purav Raja
- Runner-up: (Belarus) Alexander Bury (Sweden) Andreas Siljeström
- Score: 7–6^{(7–5)}, 4–6, [18–16]

Events
Singles	Doubles
- Tilia Slovenia Open

Sergey Betov and Alexander Bury were the defending champions, but Betov did not participate this year. Bury partnered with Andreas Siljeström, but lost the final against Fabrice Martin and Purav Raja, 6–7^{(5–7)}, 6–4, [16–18].

== Seeds ==
1. (Belarus) Alexander Bury / (Sweden) Andreas Siljeström (final)
2. (France) Fabrice Martin / (India) Purav Raja (champions)
3. (Thailand) Sanchai Ratiwatana / (Thailand) Sonchat Ratiwatana (first round)
4. (Italy) Riccardo Ghedin / (Romania) Patrick Grigoriu (first round)

== Draw ==
Key

- Q = Qualifier
- WC = Wild card
- LL = Lucky loser
- Alt = Alternate
- ITF = ITF entry
- PR = Protected ranking
- SR = Special ranking
- SE = Special exempt
- JE = Junior exempt
- JR = Junior Accelerator Programme entrant
- CO = College Accelerator Programme entrant
- NG = Next Gen Accelerator Program entrant
- w/o = Walkover
- r = Retired
- d = Defaulted

First round
1	(Belarus) A Bury (Sweden) A Siljeström	6	6
(United States) J Cerretani (Serbia) Ilija Vučić	4	4
(Serbia) L Djere (Bosnia and Herzegovina) A Šetkić	1	1
(Russia) E Donskoy (Russia) A Kudryavtsev	6	6
3	(Thailand) Sa Ratiwatana (Thailand) So Ratiwatana	4	3
(Slovakia) N Gombos (Slovakia) J Kovalík	6	6
WC	(Slovenia) A Radinski (Greece) S Tsitsipas	6	6
(Italy) P Lorenzi (Italy) M Viola	3	1
(Belgium) K Coppejans (Belgium) G Gigounon	5	2
PR	(Netherlands) T de Bakker (Netherlands) S Fransen	7	6
(Russia) A Karatsev (Chinese Taipei) H-y Peng	6	7
4	(Italy) R Ghedin (Romania) P Grigoriu	4	5
(Italy) A Arnaboldi (Chinese Taipei) H-h Lee	6	6
WC	(Slovenia) Rok Jarc (Slovenia) Aljaž Jakob Kaplja	3	4
WC	(Slovenia) David Goršič (Slovenia) T Žitnik	2	2
2	(France) F Martin (India) P Raja	6	6

Quarterfinals
1	(Belarus) A Bury (Sweden) A Siljeström	6	3	[10]
(Russia) E Donskoy (Russia) A Kudryavtsev	4	6	[6]
(Slovakia) N Gombos (Slovakia) J Kovalík	6	6
WC	(Slovenia) A Radinski (Greece) S Tsitsipas	3	1
PR	(Netherlands) T de Bakker (Netherlands) S Fransen	7	4	[10]
(Russia) A Karatsev (Chinese Taipei) H-y Peng	5	6	[5]
(Italy) A Arnaboldi (Chinese Taipei) H-h Lee	3	0
2	(France) F Martin (India) P Raja	6	6

Semifinals
1	(Belarus) A Bury (Sweden) A Siljeström	6	6
(Slovakia) N Gombos (Slovakia) J Kovalík	1	4
PR	(Netherlands) T de Bakker (Netherlands) S Fransen	2	1
2	(France) F Martin (India) P Raja	6	6

Final
1	(Belarus) A Bury (Sweden) A Siljeström	6^{5}	6	[16]
2	(France) F Martin (India) P Raja	7^{7}	4	[18]
