= 2018 Tilia Slovenia Open =

- Date: 6–11 August
- Edition: 6th
- Surface: Hard
- Location: Portorož, Slovenia

Champions

Singles
- (France) Constant Lestienne

Doubles
- (Spain) Gerard Granollers / (Czech Republic) Lukáš Rosol
- Tilia Slovenia Open

The 2018 Tilia Slovenia Open was a professional tennis tournament played on hard courts. It was the sixth edition of the tournament which was part of the 2018 ATP Challenger Tour. It took place in Portorož, Slovenia between 6 – 11 August 2018.

== Singles main-draw entrants ==
=== Seeds ===
Country	Player	Rank^{1}	Seed
UKR	Sergiy Stakhovsky	117	1
AUT	Dennis Novak	136	2
ESP	Adrián Menéndez Maceiras	143	3
ITA	Gianluigi Quinzi	162	4
ITA	Salvatore Caruso	185	5
ITA	Luca Vanni	191	6
CRO	Nino Serdarušić	193	7
ITA	Andrea Arnaboldi	199	8

- ^{1} Rankings are as of 30 July 2018.

=== Other entrants ===
The following players received wildcards into the singles main draw:

- (Slovenia) Aljaž Jakob Kaplja
- (Slovenia) Tom Kočevar-Dešman
- (Slovenia) Aljaž Radinski
- (Slovenia) Nik Razboršek

The following player received entry into the singles main draw as a special exempt:

- (Russia) Pavel Kotov

The following players received entry from the qualifying draw:

- (Turkey) Altuğ Çelikbilek
- (Sweden) Markus Eriksson
- (Russia) Aslan Karatsev
- (Denmark) Frederik Nielsen

The following player received entry as a lucky loser:

- (Belgium) Christopher Heyman

== Champions ==
=== Singles ===
- (France) Constant Lestienne def. (Italy) Andrea Arnaboldi 6–2, 6–1.

=== Doubles ===
- (Spain) Gerard Granollers / (Czech Republic) Lukáš Rosol def. (Serbia) Nikola Ćaćić / (Austria) Lucas Miedler 7–5, 6–3.
