= Viktor Durasovic =

Norwegian tennis player

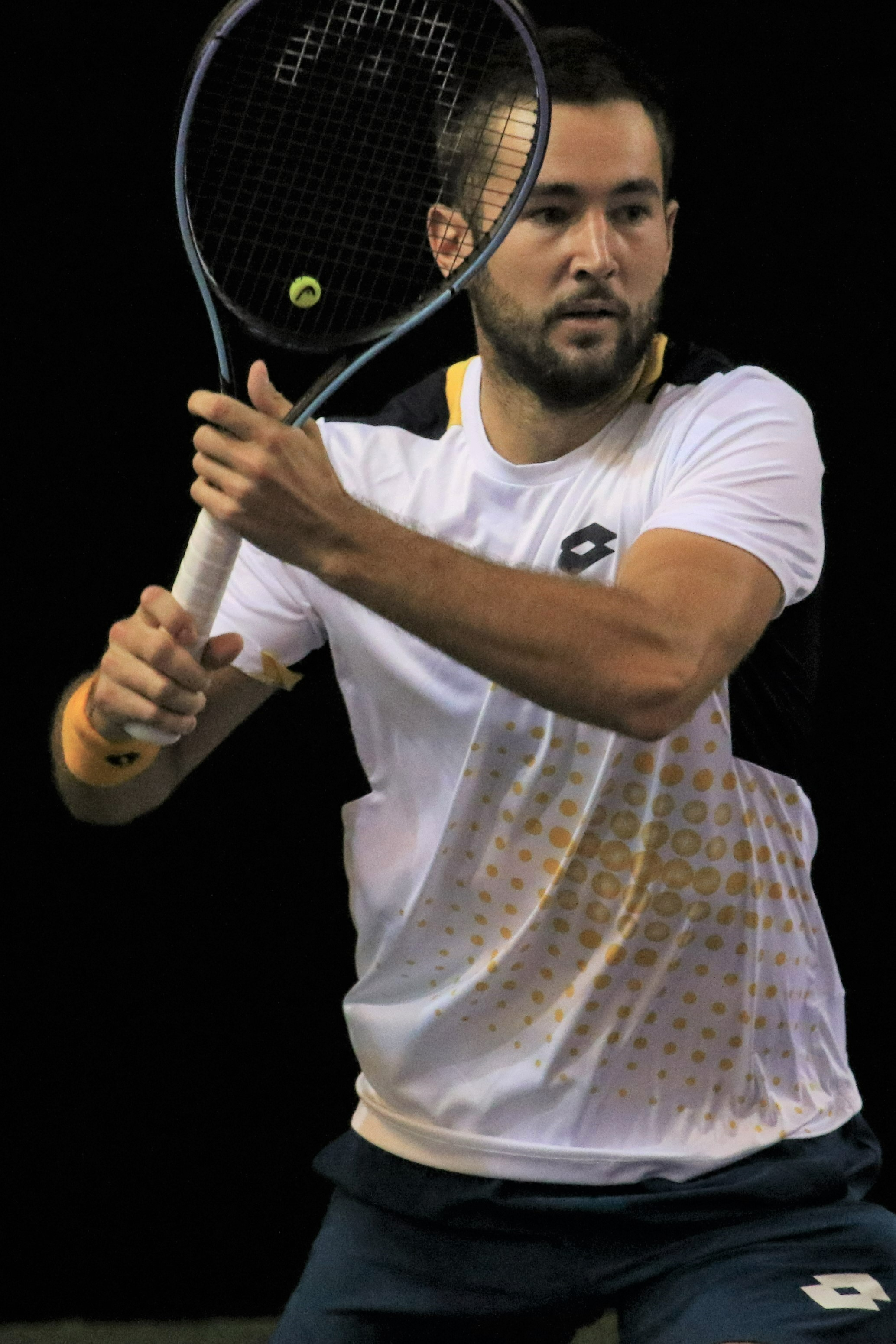
- Durasovic at the 2022 Internationaux de Tennis de Vendée
- Full name: Viktor Durasovic
- Country (sports): Norway
- Residence: Oslo, Norway
- Born: 19 March 1997 (age 29) Orkdal Municipality, Norway
- Height: 1.85 m (6 ft 1 in)
- Turned pro: 2016
- Plays: Right-handed (two handed-backhand)
- Coach: Fredrik Loven
- Prize money: US $501,577

Singles
- Career record: 11–25
- Career titles: 0
- Highest ranking: No. 222 (28 July 2025)
- Current ranking: No. 498 (9 November 2026)

Grand Slam singles results
- Australian Open: Q1 (2026)
- Wimbledon: Q1 (2025)
- US Open: Q1 (2025)

Doubles
- Career record: 9–16
- Career titles: 0
- Highest ranking: No. 157 (20 February 2023)
- Current ranking: No. 656 (9 November 2026)

Team competitions
- Davis Cup: 20–25
- Last updated on: 9 November 2026.

Viktor Durasovic (Serbian: Viktor Đurasović; born 19 March 1997) is a Norwegian professional tennis player. He has a career-high ATP singles ranking of No. 222 achieved on 28 July 2025 and a doubles ranking of No. 157, reached on 20 February 2023. He is currently the No. 3 singles player from Norway.

Durasovic represents Norway at international events, like the Davis Cup, where he has a W/L record of 11–11 in singles and 5–9 in doubles. He also competed at the 2020 and 2022 editions of the ATP Cup, and at the 2023 and the 2025 United Cups.

== Junior career ==
In May 2014, Durasovic won the Grade-2 International Junior Tournament Città di Prato in boys' doubles, with Rhett Purcell. Later that season, he reached the semifinals in the boys' doubles category at the 2014 US Open, partnering with Nicolae Frunză.

== Professional career ==
In August 2019, Durasovic reached his first ATP Challenger final at the 2019 Tilia Slovenia Open, where he lost 5–7, 3–6 to Slovenian Aljaž Bedene.

Durasovic qualified for his first ATP Tour tournament at the 2021 Stockholm Open where he lost in the first round to wildcard and former world No. 1 Andy Murray in straight sets. He qualified for his second tournament at the 2022 Sydney International where he again met and lost to Andy Murray in the first round.

In January 2025, Durasovic won his first ATP Challenger title after winning the Lexus Nottingham Challenger. The win also meant he reached a new career-high ranking of world No. 289 on 13 January 2025.

The following month, Durasovic reached another ATP Challenger final. He lost to fellow countryman Nicolai Budkov Kjær 3–4, 3–6 in the 2025 Glasgow Challenger. The match up was only the second time ever two Norwegian have met in a Challenger final, after Christian Ruud and Jan Frode Andersen who met in Fürth in 1998. The result made him reach a new career high ranking of No. 238.

== Personal life ==
Durasovic is of Serbian heritage.

== Performance timeline ==
Key
W	F	SF	QF	#R	RR	Q#	DNQ	A	NH

(W) winner; (F) finalist; (SF) semifinalist; (QF) quarterfinalist; (#R) rounds 4, 3, 2, 1; (RR) round-robin stage; (Q#) qualification round; (DNQ) did not qualify; (A) absent; (NH) not held; (SR) strike rate (events won / competed); (W–L) win–loss record.
To avoid confusion and double counting, these charts are updated at the conclusion of a tournament or when the player's participation has ended.

=== Singles ===
Tournament	2025	2026	SR	W–L	Win %
Grand Slam tournaments
Australian Open	A	Q1	0 / 0	0–0	–
French Open	A		0 / 0	0–0	–
Wimbledon	Q1		0 / 0	0–0	–
US Open	Q1		0 / 0	0–0	–
Win–loss	0–0	0–0	0 / 0	0–0	–
ATP Masters 1000
Indian Wells Masters	A		0 / 0	0–0	–
Miami Open	A		0 / 0	0–0	–
Monte Carlo Masters	A		0 / 0	0–0	–
Madrid Open	A		0 / 0	0-0	–
Italian Open	A		0 / 0	0–0	–
Canadian Open	A		0 / 0	0–0	–
Cincinnati Masters	A		0 / 0	0–0	–
Shanghai Masters	A		0 / 0	0–0	–
Paris Masters	A		0 / 0	0–0	–
Win–loss	0–0	0–0	0 / 0	0–0	–

== ATP Challenger Tour finals ==
=== Singles: 2 (1 title, 2 runner-ups) ===
Legend ATP Challenger Tour (1–2)

Result	W–L	Date	Tournament	Tier	Surface	Opponent	Score
Loss	0–1	Aug 2019	Slovenia Open, Slovenia	Challenger	Hard	(Slovenia) Aljaž Bedene	5–7, 3–6
Win	1–1	Jan 2025	Nottingham Challenger, UK	Challenger	Hard (i)	(United Kingdom) Henry Searle	7–6^{(8–6)}, 3–6, 6–1
Loss	1–2	Feb 2025	Glasgow Challenger, UK	Challenger	Hard (i)	(Norway) Nicolai Budkov Kjær	4–6, 3–6

=== Doubles: 3 (2 titles, 1 runner-up) ===
Legend ATP Challenger Tour (2–1)

Result	W–L	Date	Tournament	Tier	Surface	Partner	Opponents	Score
Win	1–0	Mar 2022	Play In Challenger, France	Challenger	Hard (i)	(Finland) Patrik Niklas-Salminen	(France) Jonathan Eysseric (France) Quentin Halys	7–5, 7–6^{(7–1)}
Win	2–0	Oct 2022	Brest Challenger, France	Challenger	Hard (i)	(Finland) Otto Virtanen	(Sweden) Filip Bergevi (Greece) Petros Tsitsipas	6–4, 6–4
Loss	2–1	Apr 2026	Shymkent Challenger, Kazakhstan	Challenger	Clay	(Germany) Kai Wehnelt	(Croatia) Admir Kalender (Croatia) Mili Poljičak	2–6, 7–6^{(9–7)}, [5–10]

== ITF Futures/World Tennis Tour finals ==
=== Singles: 17 (8 titles, 9 runner-ups) ===
Legend ITF Futures/WTT (8–9)	Finals by surface Hard (6–8) Clay (2–1)

Result	W–L	Date	Tournament	Tier	Surface	Opponent	Score
Loss	0–1	Oct 2014	Portugal F8, Oliveira de Azeméis	Futures	Hard	(Spain) Jaime Pulgar-García	2–6, 3–6
Win	1–1	Mar 2015	Tunisia F7, Port El Kantaoui	Futures	Hard	(France) Yannick Jankovits	2–6, 6–4, 6–0
Win	2–1	Apr 2015	Italy F6, Santa Margherita di Pula	Futures	Clay	(Croatia) Viktor Galović	6–3, 6–2
Loss	2–2	May 2015	Bosnia and Herzegovina F1, Doboj	Futures	Clay	(Germany) Pascal Meis	4–6, 6–3, 3–6
Loss	2–3	Nov 2015	Norway F2, Oslo	Futures	Hard	(Netherlands) Scott Griekspoor	2–6, 7–6^{(7–4)}, 5–7
Loss	2–4	Aug 2016	Spain F25, Ourense	Futures	Hard	(Spain) Andrés Artuñedo	3–6, 2–6
Loss	2–5	Apr 2017	Bahrain F2, Manama	Futures	Hard	(France) Mick Lescure	5–7, 6–7^{(4–7)}
Win	3–5	Oct 2017	Egypt F28, Sharm El Sheikh	Futures	Hard	(Czech Republic) Tomáš Papik	2–6, 6–3, 7–5
Win	4–5	Nov 2017	Egypt F33, Sharm El Sheikh	Futures	Hard	(Spain) Pablo Vivero González	6–7^{(4–7)}, 6–4, 6–4
Loss	4–6	Jul 2018	Spain F16, Palma del Río	Futures	Hard	(Austria) Lucas Miedler	2–6, 6–7^{(6–8)}
Win	5–6	Mar 2019	M15 Sharm El Sheikh, Egypt	WTT	Hard	(Germany) Daniel Altmaier	6–7^{(5–7)}, 6–4, 6–4
Win	6–6	Jul 2021	M25 Bourg-en-Bresse, France	WTT	Clay	(Italy) Franco Agamenone	6–1, 6–1
Loss	6–7	Sep 2021	M25 Jönköping, Sweden	WTT	Hard (i)	(Finland) Otto Virtanen	4–6, 0–6
Win	7–7	Oct 2021	M25 Nevers, France	WTT	Hard (i)	(France) Arthur Reymond	6–2, 6–4
Loss	7–8	Jul 2024	M25 Roehampton, UK	WTT	Hard	(United Kingdom) George Loffhagen	4–6, 3–6
Win	8–8	Oct 2024	M25 Nevers, France (2)	WTT	Hard (i)	(France) Théo Papamalamis	6–2, 6–4
Loss	8–9	Mar 2026	M25 Toulouse–Balma, France	WTT	Hard (i)	(Belgium) Gauthier Onclin	3–6, 2–6

=== Doubles: 18 (11 titles, 7 runner-ups) ===
Legend ITF Futures/WTT (11–7)	Finals by surface Hard (8–5) Clay (3–2)

Result	W–L	Date	Tournament	Tier	Surface	Partner	Opponents	Score
Win	1–0	Oct 2015	Spain F31, Sabadell	Futures	Clay	(Spain) Bernabé Zapata Miralles	(Spain) J-S Araúzo-Martínez (Germany) Jean-Marc Werner	6–4, 6–1
Loss	1–1	May 2016	Italy F8, Santa Margherita di Pula	Futures	Clay	(France) Samuel Bensoussan	(Italy) Francisco Bahamonde (Italy) Andrea Pellegrino	4–6, 4–6
Win	2–1	Jul 2016	Spain F19, Bakio	Futures	Hard	(Spain) Jaume Munar	(Spain) Juan Lizariturry (Spain) Jaume Pla Malfeito	6–3, 6–4
Win	3–1	Oct 2016	Norway F1, Oslo	Futures	Hard	(Austria) Lucas Miedler	(Sweden) David Norfeldt (Sweden) Robin Thour	6–1, 6–1
Win	4–1	Jan 2017	Turkey F1, Antalya	Futures	Hard	(Croatia) Nino Serdarušić	(United Kingdom) Liam Broady (United Kingdom) Luke Johnson	6–3, 6–3
Loss	4–2	Mar 2017	Portugal F1, Vale do Lobo	Futures	Hard	(Austria) Lucas Miedler	(Italy) Erik Crepaldi (Portugal) Gonçalo Oliveira	6–1, 2–6, [5–10]
Loss	4–3	May 2017	Nigeria F1, Abuja	Futures	Hard	(Italy) Alessandro Bega	(Brazil) Fabiano de Paula (Brazil) Fernando Romboli	4–6, 7–6^{(7–5)}, [7–10]
Win	5–3	May 2017	Nigeria F2, Abuja	Futures	Hard	(Italy) Alessandro Bega	(Nigeria) Sylvester Emmanuel (France) Calvin Hemery	6–4, 6–0
Loss	5–4	Sep 2017	Spain F28, Oviedo	Futures	Clay	(Spain) Miguel Semmler	(Argentina) Franco Agamenone (Brazil) João Menezes	5–7, 3–6
Win	6–4	Dec 2017	Dominican Republic F1, Santo Domingo	Futures	Hard	(Poland) Adrian Andrzejczuk	(Colombia) Alejandro Gómez (United States) John Lamble	3–6, 6–3, [10–4]
Win	7–4	Mar 2018	France F5, Poitiers	Futures	Hard (i)	(Finland) Emil Ruusuvuori	(Germany) Christian Hirschmueller (Germany) David Novotny	6–4, 7–6^{(7–1)}
Win	8–4	Oct 2020	M25 Hamburg, Germany	WTT	Hard	(Sweden) Markus Eriksson	(Italy) Raúl Brancaccio (Netherlands) Mark Vervoort	6–3, 5–7, [11–9]
Loss	8–5	Apr 2021	M25 Meerbusch, Germany	WTT	Clay	(Sweden) Markus Eriksson	(Czech Republic) Jiří Lehečka (Czech Republic) Michael Vrbenský	3–6, 3–6
Loss	8–6	Oct 2021	M25 Hamburg, Germany	WTT	Hard	(Ukraine) Vladyslav Orlov	(Switzerland) Leandro Riedi (Switzerland) Yannik Steinegger	3–6, 2–6
Win	9–6	May 2024	M25 Värnamo, Sweden	WTT	Clay	(Norway) Lukas Hellum Lilleengen	(Sweden) Henrik Bladelius (Sweden) Filip Gustafsson	7–5, 6–3
Win	10–6	Jun 2024	M25 Brussels, Belgium	WTT	Clay	(Belgium) Simon Beaupain	(Germany) John Sperle (Germany) Marlon Vankan	6–4, 6–2
Loss	10–7	Jul 2024	M25 Roehampton, UK	WTT	Hard	(Norway) Lukas Hellum Lilleengen	(Australia) Joshua Charlton (United Kingdom) Harry Wendelken	6–3, 6–7^{(1–7)}, [9–11]
Win	11–7	Oct 2024	M25 Glasgow, UK	WTT	Hard (i)	(Norway) Lukas Hellum Lilleengen	(United Kingdom) Alexis Canter (United Kingdom) Marcus Walters	6–7^{(5–7)}, 6–2, [10–4]

== National and international representation ==
=== United Cup: 4 (4 defeats) ===
Group membership United Cup (0–4)	Matches by Surface Hard (0–4)	Matches by Type Singles (0–2) Doubles (0–2)	Matches by setting Outdoors (0–4) Indoors (–)

Result	No.	Surface	Match type (partner)	Opponent nation	Opponent player(s)	Score
2023
29 December–8 January; Pat Rafter Arena, Brisbane, Australia; Group stage; Hard surface
Loss	1.	Hard	Singles	Brazil	(Brazil) Felipe Meligeni Alves	3–6, 3–6
Loss	2.	Hard	Mixed doubles (with Ulrikke Eikeri)	Brazil	(Brazil) Rafael Matos / (Brazil) Luisa Stefani	4–6, 5–7
Loss	3.	Hard	Singles	Italy	(Italy) Lorenzo Musetti	6–7^{(7–9)}, 3–6
Loss	4.	Hard	Mixed doubles (with Ulrikke Eikeri)	Italy	(Italy) Lorenzo Musetti / (Italy) Camilla Rosatello	6–7^{(6–8)}, 2–6
