= 2015 Brasil Open – Doubles =

Doubles
- 2015 Brasil Open

Final
- Champions: (Colombia) Juan Sebastián Cabal (Colombia) Robert Farah
- Runners-up: (Italy) Paolo Lorenzi (Argentina) Diego Schwartzman
- Score: 6–4, 6–2

Details
- Draw: 16
- Seeds: 4

Events
Singles	Doubles
← 2014 ·	Brasil Open	· 2016 →

Guillermo García-López and Philipp Oswald were the defending champions, but García-López chose not to participate this year. Oswald played alongside Martin Kližan, but they lost in the first round to Carlos Berlocq and Leonardo Mayer.
Juan Sebastián Cabal and Robert Farah won the title, defeating Paolo Lorenzi and Diego Schwartzman in the final, 6–4, 6–2.

== Seeds ==
1. (Austria) Alexander Peya / (Brazil) Bruno Soares (first round)
2. (Colombia) Juan Sebastián Cabal / (Colombia) Robert Farah (champions)
3. (Austria) Julian Knowle / (Brazil) Marcelo Melo (semifinals)
4. (Uruguay) Pablo Cuevas / (Spain) David Marrero (first round)

== Draw ==
=== Key ===
- Q = Qualifier
- WC = Wild card
- LL = Lucky loser
- Alt = Alternate
- ITF = ITF entry
- PR = Protected ranking
- SR = Special ranking
- SE = Special exempt
- JE = Junior exempt
- JR = Junior Accelerator Programme entrant
- CO = College Accelerator Programme entrant
- NG = Next Gen Accelerator Program entrant
- w/o = Walkover
- r = Retired
- d = Defaulted

=== Draw ===
First round
1	(Austria) A Peya (Brazil) B Soares	6	4	[8]
(Italy) P Lorenzi (Argentina) D Schwartzman	4	6	[10]
(Spain) P Andújar (Austria) O Marach	7^{7}	6
(Spain) P Carreño Busta (Spain) D Gimeno-Traver	6^{4}	4
4	(Uruguay) P Cuevas (Spain) D Marrero	5	7^{7}	[13]
(Czech Republic) F Čermák (Czech Republic) J Veselý	7	6^{2}	[15]
(Argentina) M González (Argentina) J Mónaco	6^{4}	6^{3}
WC	(Brazil) A Sá (Brazil) J Souza	7^{7}	7^{7}
(Slovakia) M Kližan (Austria) P Oswald	2	6^{6}
(Argentina) C Berlocq (Argentina) L Mayer	6	7^{8}
(Spain) N Almagro (Italy) F Fognini	6	3	[5]
3	(Austria) J Knowle (Brazil) M Melo	4	6	[10]
(Colombia) N Barrientos (Colombia) S Giraldo	6	6
(Austria) A Haider-Maurer (Spain) A Ramos-Viñolas	3	3
WC	(Brazil) M Demoliner (Brazil) R Dutra Silva	6^{5}	6	[6]
2	(Colombia) JS Cabal (Colombia) R Farah	7^{7}	4	[10]

Quarterfinals
(Italy) P Lorenzi (Argentina) D Schwartzman	6	7^{9}
(Spain) P Andújar (Austria) O Marach	1	6^{7}
(Czech Republic) F Čermák (Czech Republic) J Veselý	6	6
WC	(Brazil) A Sá (Brazil) J Souza	3	4
(Argentina) C Berlocq (Argentina) L Mayer	5	6^{3}
3	(Austria) J Knowle (Brazil) M Melo	7	7^{7}
(Colombia) N Barrientos (Colombia) S Giraldo	2	2
2	(Colombia) JS Cabal (Colombia) R Farah	6	6

Semifinals
(Italy) P Lorenzi (Argentina) D Schwartzman	6	3	[12]
(Czech Republic) F Čermák (Czech Republic) J Veselý	4	6	[10]
3	(Austria) J Knowle (Brazil) M Melo	5	6	[6]
2	(Colombia) JS Cabal (Colombia) R Farah	7	4	[10]

Final
(Italy) P Lorenzi (Argentina) D Schwartzman	4	2
2	(Colombia) JS Cabal (Colombia) R Farah	6	6
