= 2015 Brasil Open – Singles =

Singles
- 2015 Brasil Open

Final
- Champion: (Uruguay) Pablo Cuevas
- Runner-up: (Italy) Luca Vanni
- Score: 6–4, 3–6, 7–6^{(7–4)}

Details
- Draw: 28
- Seeds: 4

Events
Singles	Doubles
← 2014 ·	Brasil Open	· 2016 →

Federico Delbonis was the defending champion, but lost to Facundo Bagnis in the first round.
Pablo Cuevas won the title, defeating Luca Vanni in the final, 6–4, 3–6, 7–6^{(7–4)}.

== Seeds ==
The top four seeds receive a bye into the second round.

1. (Spain) Feliciano López (withdrew)
2. (Spain) Tommy Robredo (second round)
3. (Italy) Fabio Fognini (quarterfinals)
4. (Argentina) Leonardo Mayer (quarterfinals)

5. (Uruguay) Pablo Cuevas (champion)
6. (Colombia) Santiago Giraldo (semifinals)
7. (Spain) Fernando Verdasco (second round)
8. (Slovakia) Martin Kližan (second round)

== Draw ==
=== Key ===
- Q = Qualifier
- WC = Wild card
- LL = Lucky loser
- Alt = Alternate
- ITF = ITF entry
- PR = Protected ranking
- SR = Special ranking
- SE = Special exempt
- JE = Junior exempt
- JR = Junior Accelerator Programme entrant
- CO = College Accelerator Programme entrant
- NG = Next Gen Accelerator Program entrant
- w/o = Walkover
- r = Retired
- d = Defaulted

=== Finals ===
Semifinals
Q	(Italy) Luca Vanni	6	6^{5}	6
WC	(Brazil) João Souza	4	7^{7}	4
6	(Colombia) Santiago Giraldo	4	3
5	(Uruguay) Pablo Cuevas	6	6

Final
Q	(Italy) Luca Vanni	4	6	6^{4}
5	(Uruguay) Pablo Cuevas	6	3	7^{7}

=== Top half ===
First round
(Argentina) J Mónaco	7^{7}	6^{4}	4
Q	(Netherlands) T de Bakker	6^{5}	7^{7}	6
(Serbia) D Lajović	3	6	6
(Spain) P Andújar	6	3	2
Q	(Argentina) M González	2	3
7	(Spain) F Verdasco	6	6
(Spain) A Ramos Viñolas	7	7
WC	(Brazil) G Clezar	5	5
(Spain) P Carreño Busta	2	6^{6}
WC	(Brazil) J Souza	6	7^{8}
(Brazil) T Bellucci	7	3	5
8	(Slovakia) M Kližan	5	6	7

Second round
Q	(Italy) L Vanni	7^{7}	3	6
Q	(Netherlands) T de Bakker	6^{5}	6	3
(Serbia) D Lajović	6^{6}	6	6
7	(Spain) F Verdasco	7^{8}	3	4
4	(Argentina) L Mayer	6	3	6
(Spain) A Ramos Viñolas	4	6	1
WC	(Brazil) J Souza	3	6	6
8	(Slovakia) M Kližan	6	3	2

Quarterfinals
Q	(Italy) L Vanni	7^{7}	7^{7}
(Serbia) D Lajović	6^{5}	6^{4}
4	(Argentina) L Mayer	4	6	3
WC	(Brazil) J Souza	6	3	6

Semifinals
Q	(Italy) L Vanni	6	6^{5}	6
WC	(Brazil) J Souza	4	7^{7}	4

=== Bottom half ===
First round
6	(Colombia) S Giraldo	7	7^{7}
WC	(Belgium) K Coppejans	5	6^{4}
(Argentina) C Berlocq	6	7^{7}
Q	(Argentina) G Pella	4	6^{4}
(Argentina) D Schwartzman	7	6
(Italy) P Lorenzi	5	4
5	(Uruguay) P Cuevas	6	3	7
(Czech Republic) J Veselý	4	6	5
LL	(Argentina) F Bagnis	6	2	6
(Argentina) F Delbonis	3	6	4
(Slovenia) B Rola	6^{3}	4
(Spain) N Almagro	7^{7}	6

Second round
6	(Colombia) S Giraldo	4	7	6
(Argentina) C Berlocq	6	5	3
(Argentina) D Schwartzman	3	6	2
3	(Italy) F Fognini	6	1	6
5	(Uruguay) P Cuevas	5
LL	(Argentina) F Bagnis	1^{r}
(Spain) N Almagro	6	7^{7}
2	(Spain) T Robredo	3	6^{1}

Quarterfinals
6	(Colombia) S Giraldo	7^{7}	7
3	(Italy) F Fognini	6^{4}	5
5	(Uruguay) P Cuevas	7^{8}	3	6
(Spain) N Almagro	6^{6}	6	2

Semifinals
6	(Colombia) S Giraldo	4	3
5	(Uruguay) P Cuevas	6	6

== Qualifying ==
=== Seeds ===
1. (Austria) Andreas Haider-Maurer (second round)
2. (Spain) Daniel Gimeno Traver (qualifying competition)
3. (Argentina) Máximo González (qualified)
4. (Argentina) Facundo Bagnis (qualifying competition, lucky loser)
5. (Netherlands) Thiemo de Bakker (qualified)
6. (Italy) Luca Vanni (qualified)
7. (Romania) Adrian Ungur (qualifying competition)
8. (Italy) Marco Cecchinato (second round)

=== Qualifiers ===
1. (Argentina) Guido Pella
2. (Italy) Luca Vanni
3. (Argentina) Máximo González
4. (Netherlands) Thiemo de Bakker

=== Lucky losers ===
1. (Argentina) Facundo Bagnis

=== Qualifying draw ===
==== First qualifier ====
First round
1	(Austria) Andreas Haider-Maurer	6	7
(Colombia) Nicolás Barrientos	1	5
(Argentina) Guido Pella	5	6	6
(Argentina) Andrea Collarini	7	1	4
(Brazil) João Pedro Sorgi	0	1
(Sweden) Christian Lindell	6	6
WC	(Brazil) Carlos Eduardo Severino	5	5
7	(Romania) Adrian Ungur	7	7

Second round
1	(Austria) Andreas Haider-Maurer	1	6	6^{4}
(Argentina) Guido Pella	6	4	7^{7}
(Sweden) Christian Lindell	4	4
7	(Romania) Adrian Ungur	6	6

Qualifying competition
(Argentina) Guido Pella	6	3	6
7	(Romania) Adrian Ungur	3	6	2

==== Second qualifier ====
First round
2	(Spain) Daniel Gimeno Traver	6	6
WC	(Brazil) Fernando Romboli	4	4
(Brazil) Tiago Lopes	6	6
(Brazil) Daniel Dutra da Silva	4	2
(Uruguay) Martín Cuevas	4	6	1
(Brazil) Rogério Dutra Silva	6	4	6
WC	(Brazil) Alexandre Tsuchiya	4	5
6	(Italy) Luca Vanni	6	7

Second round
2	(Spain) Daniel Gimeno Traver	6	6^{6}	6
(Brazil) Tiago Lopes	1	7^{8}	3
(Brazil) Rogério Dutra Silva	2	4
6	(Italy) Luca Vanni	6	6

Qualifying competition
2	(Spain) Daniel Gimeno Traver	4	4
6	(Italy) Luca Vanni	6	6

==== Third qualifier ====
First round
3	(Argentina) Máximo González	3	6	7^{7}
(Brazil) Thiago Monteiro	6	2	6^{1}
(Argentina) Nicolás Kicker	2	3
(Ecuador) Giovanni Lapentti	6	6
(Brazil) André Ghem	7	6
(Brazil) Henrique Cunha	5	3
(Brazil) Caio Zampieri	7^{7}	4	4
8	(Italy) Marco Cecchinato	6^{4}	6	6

Second round
3	(Argentina) Máximo González	7	2
(Ecuador) Giovanni Lapentti	5	0^{r}
(Brazil) André Ghem	6	7^{7}
8	(Italy) Marco Cecchinato	3	6^{3}

Qualifying competition
3	(Argentina) Máximo González	6	1	6
(Brazil) André Ghem	4	6	3

==== Fourth qualifier ====
First round
4	(Argentina) Facundo Bagnis	6	6
WC	(Brazil) Caio Silva	2	0
(Brazil) André Miele	1	1
(Brazil) Fabrício Neis	6	6
(Sweden) Elias Ymer	6	6
(Brazil) Ricardo Hocevar	2	2
(Italy) Filippo Volandri	1	2
5	(Netherlands) Thiemo de Bakker	6	6

Second round
4	(Argentina) Facundo Bagnis	6	6
(Brazil) Fabrício Neis	3	4
(Sweden) Elias Ymer	3	3
5	(Netherlands) Thiemo de Bakker	6	6

Qualifying competition
4	(Argentina) Facundo Bagnis	1	4
5	(Netherlands) Thiemo de Bakker	6	6
