= 2019 Tilia Slovenia Open – Doubles =

Doubles
- 2019 Tilia Slovenia Open

Final
- Champions: (Russia) Teymuraz Gabashvili (Spain) Carlos Gómez-Herrera
- Runners-up: (Austria) Lucas Miedler (Austria) Tristan-Samuel Weissborn
- Score: 6–3, 6–2

Events
Singles	Doubles
- Tilia Slovenia Open

Gerard Granollers and Lukáš Rosol were the defending champions but chose not to defend their title.

Teymuraz Gabashvili and Carlos Gómez-Herrera won the title after defeating Lucas Miedler and Tristan-Samuel Weissborn 6–3, 6–2 in the final.

== Seeds ==
1. (Monaco) Romain Arneodo / (Monaco) Hugo Nys (first round)
2. (Australia) Rameez Junaid / (India) Purav Raja (first round)
3. (Austria) Lucas Miedler / (Austria) Tristan-Samuel Weissborn (final)
4. (Croatia) Ivan Sabanov / (Croatia) Matej Sabanov (first round)

== Draw ==
Key

- Q = Qualifier
- WC = Wild card
- LL = Lucky loser
- Alt = Alternate
- ITF = ITF entry
- PR = Protected ranking
- SR = Special ranking
- SE = Special exempt
- JE = Junior exempt
- JR = Junior Accelerator Programme entrant
- CO = College Accelerator Programme entrant
- NG = Next Gen Accelerator Program entrant
- w/o = Walkover
- r = Retired
- d = Defaulted

First round
1	(Monaco) R Arneodo (Monaco) H Nys	6^{5}	6^{3}
(United States) E King (Italy) J Ocleppo	7^{7}	7^{7}
WC	(Slovenia) Sven Lah (Slovenia) T Lipovšek Puches	2	3
WC	(Turkey) S Ağabigün (Turkey) A Çelikbilek	6	6
4	(Croatia) I Sabanov (Croatia) M Sabanov	2	6^{3}
PR	(Russia) T Gabashvili (Spain) C Gómez-Herrera	6	7^{7}
(Ukraine) I Marchenko (Slovakia) I Zelenay	6	7
PR	(Ukraine) S Stakhovsky (Serbia) N Zimonjić	3	5
ITF	(Netherlands) I Sijsling (Netherlands) G Smits	6^{6}	7	[10]
(Kazakhstan) A Golubev (Italy) A Vavassori	7^{8}	5	[7]
WC	(Slovenia) Aljaž Jakob Kaplja (Slovenia) Bor Schweiger Mužar	2	2
3	(Austria) L Miedler (Austria) T-S Weissborn	6	6
(Russia) E Karlovskiy (Czech Republic) Z Kolář	7	0	[5]
ITF	(Argentina) TM Etcheverry (Argentina) Matías Zukas	5	6	[10]
PR	(Colombia) N Barrientos (Uruguay) A Behar	5	6	[10]
2	(Australia) R Junaid (India) P Raja	7	0	[7]

Quarterfinals
(United States) E King (Italy) J Ocleppo	4	4
WC	(Turkey) S Ağabigün (Turkey) A Çelikbilek	6	6
PR	(Russia) T Gabashvili (Spain) C Gómez-Herrera	4	6	[10]
(Ukraine) I Marchenko (Slovakia) I Zelenay	6	4	[7]
ITF	(Netherlands) I Sijsling (Netherlands) G Smits	2	4
3	(Austria) L Miedler (Austria) T-S Weissborn	6	6
ITF	(Argentina) TM Etcheverry (Argentina) M Zukas	1	1
PR	(Colombia) N Barrientos (Uruguay) A Behar	6	6

Semifinals
WC	(Turkey) S Ağabigün (Turkey) A Çelikbilek	4	4
PR	(Russia) T Gabashvili (Spain) C Gómez-Herrera	6	6
3	(Austria) L Miedler (Austria) T-S Weissborn	0	7^{7}	[11]
PR	(Colombia) N Barrientos (Uruguay) A Behar	6	6^{5}	[9]

Final
PR	(Russia) T Gabashvili (Spain) C Gómez-Herrera	6	6
3	(Austria) L Miedler (Austria) T-S Weissborn	3	2
