= Taverne =

Taverne is a surname. Notable people with the surname include:

- Dick Taverne (1928–2025), British politician
- Joost Taverne (born 1971), Dutch politician
- Michaël Taverne (born 1979), French politician
- Omer Taverne (1904–1981), Belgian cycle racer

== See also ==
- Laverne (name)
- Tavern
- Taverna
