= 2017 Tilia Slovenia Open – Doubles =

Doubles
- 2017 Tilia Slovenia Open

Final
- Champions: (Chile) Hans Podlipnik-Castillo (Belarus) Andrei Vasilevski
- Runners-up: (Czech Republic) Lukáš Rosol (Croatia) Franko Škugor
- Score: 6–3, 7–6^{(7–4)}

Events
Singles	Doubles
- Tilia Slovenia Open

Sergey Betov and Ilya Ivashka were the defending champions but only Ivashka chose to defend his title, partnering Aldin Šetkić. Ivashka lost in the semifinals to Lukáš Rosol and Franko Škugor.

Hans Podlipnik-Castillo and Andrei Vasilevski won the title after defeating Rosol and Škugor 6–3, 7–6^{(7–4)} in the final.

== Seeds ==
1. (Chile) Hans Podlipnik-Castillo / (Belarus) Andrei Vasilevski (champions)
2. (Belarus) Aliaksandr Bury / (Croatia) Dino Marcan (first round)
3. (Sweden) Johan Brunström / (United Kingdom) Joe Salisbury (first round)
4. (France) Albano Olivetti / (Slovakia) Igor Zelenay (first round)

== Draw ==
Key

- Q = Qualifier
- WC = Wild card
- LL = Lucky loser
- Alt = Alternate
- ITF = ITF entry
- PR = Protected ranking
- SR = Special ranking
- SE = Special exempt
- JE = Junior exempt
- JR = Junior Accelerator Programme entrant
- CO = College Accelerator Programme entrant
- NG = Next Gen Accelerator Program entrant
- w/o = Walkover
- r = Retired
- d = Defaulted

First round
1	(Chile) H Podlipnik-Castillo (Belarus) A Vasilevski	7^{7}	6
(Slovakia) J Kovalík (Greece) S Tsitsipas	6^{5}	2
WC	(Spain) Jaime Fermosell Delgado (Slovenia) T Kočevar-Dešman	6	7
(Kazakhstan) T Khabibulin (Kazakhstan) D Popko	0	5
3	(Sweden) J Brunström (United Kingdom) J Salisbury	6^{3}	6^{7}
(Italy) M Berrettini (Italy) F Cipolla	7^{7}	7^{9}
(United Kingdom) S Clayton (United Kingdom) J O'Mara	6	2	[9]
(Spain) A Menéndez-Maceiras (Ukraine) S Stakhovsky	3	6	[11]
(Serbia) I Bozoljac (Serbia) F Krajinović	6	6
WC	(Slovenia) David Lucas Ambrozić (Slovenia) T Žitnik	2	4
(Belarus) I Ivashka (Bosnia and Herzegovina) A Šetkić	6	5	[10]
4	(France) A Olivetti (Slovakia) I Zelenay	1	7	[8]
WC	(Slovenia) Grega Boh (Slovenia) Gregor Repina	0	0
(Spain) P Martínez (Spain) R Ortega Olmedo	6	6
(Czech Republic) L Rosol (Croatia) F Škugor	6	7^{7}
2	(Belarus) A Bury (Croatia) D Marcan	2	6^{2}

Quarterfinals
1	(Chile) H Podlipnik-Castillo (Belarus) A Vasilevski	6	6
WC	(Spain) J Fermosell Delgado (Slovenia) T Kočevar-Dešman	0	0
(Italy) M Berrettini (Italy) F Cipolla	6	2	[10]
(Spain) A Menéndez-Maceiras (Ukraine) S Stakhovsky	3	6	[5]
(Serbia) I Bozoljac (Serbia) F Krajinović	4	3
(Belarus) I Ivashka (Bosnia and Herzegovina) A Šetkić	6	6
(Spain) P Martínez (Spain) R Ortega Olmedo	6^{5}	0
(Czech Republic) L Rosol (Croatia) F Škugor	7^{7}	6

Semifinals
1	(Chile) H Podlipnik-Castillo (Belarus) A Vasilevski	6	6
(Italy) M Berrettini (Italy) F Cipolla	3	4
(Belarus) I Ivashka (Bosnia and Herzegovina) A Šetkić	3	2
(Czech Republic) L Rosol (Croatia) F Škugor	6	6

Final
1	(Chile) H Podlipnik-Castillo (Belarus) A Vasilevski	6	7^{7}
(Czech Republic) L Rosol (Croatia) F Škugor	3	6^{4}
