= Luca Vanni =

Italian tennis player

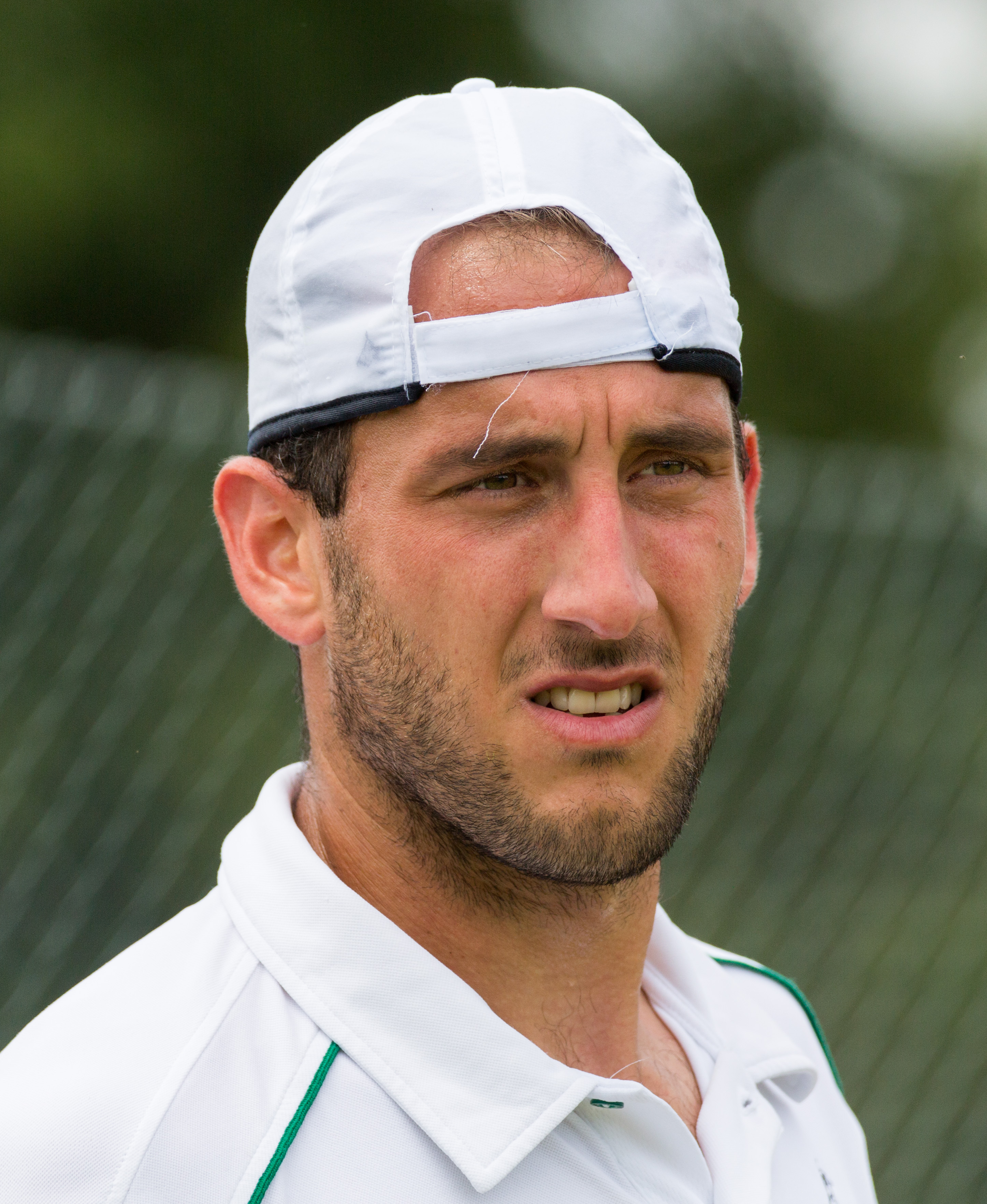
- Country (sports): Italy
- Residence: Foiano della Chiana, Italy
- Born: 4 June 1985 (age 41) Castel del Piano, Italy
- Height: 1.98 m (6 ft 6 in)
- Turned pro: 2006
- Retired: 2021
- Plays: Right-handed (two-handed backhand)
- Coach: Fabio Gorietti
- Prize money: US$791,440

Singles
- Career record: 5–18
- Career titles: 0
- Highest ranking: No. 100 (11 May 2015)

Grand Slam singles results
- Australian Open: 1R (2017, 2019)
- French Open: 1R (2015)
- Wimbledon: 1R (2015)
- US Open: Q2 (2015)

Doubles
- Career record: 0–1
- Career titles: 0
- Highest ranking: No. 204 (9 July 2012)
- Last updated on: 14 June 2021.

Luca Vanni (born 4 June 1985) is an Italian former professional tennis player. He competed mainly on the ATP Challenger Tour and ITF Futures, both in singles and doubles. He reached his highest ATP singles ranking, No. 100 on 11 May 2015, and his highest ATP doubles ranking, No. 204, on 9 July 2012.

== Career ==
In 2014, he won seven ITF Futures tournaments, his best season to date.

In 2015, he reached his first ATP final in the Brasil Open, but lost to Pablo Cuevas. Later he qualified to the Madrid Masters and reached second round after defeating the world number 26 player Bernard Tomic. In 2015, at the age of 30, he became the oldest Challenger winner in Portorož, Slovenia.

== ATP career finals ==
=== Singles: 1 (1 runner-up) ===
Legend Grand Slam Tournaments (0–0) ATP World Tour Finals (0–0) ATP World Tour Masters 1000 (0–0) ATP World Tour 500 Series (0–0) ATP World Tour 250 Series (0–1)	Titles by surface Hard (0–0) Clay (0–1) Grass (0–0) Carpet (0–0)

Result	W–L	Date	Tournament	Tier	Surface	Opponent	Score
Loss	0–1	Feb 2015	Brasil Open, Brazil	250 Series	Clay (i)	(Uruguay) Pablo Cuevas	4–6, 6–3, 6–7^{(4–7)}

== ATP Challenger and ITF Futures finals ==
=== Singles: 31 (21–10) ===
Legend ATP Challenger (5–2) ITF Futures (16–8)	Finals by surface Hard (6–4) Clay (13–5) Grass (0–0) Carpet (2–1)

Result	W–L	Date	Tournament	Tier	Surface	Opponent	Score
Win	1–0	Aug 2006	Italy F26, Avezzano	Futures	Clay	(Italy) Marco Di Vuolo	2–6, 6–2, 7–6^{(7–5)}
Loss	1–1	Aug 2007	Italy F26, Avezzano	Futures	Clay	(Russia) Valery Rudnev	3–6, 6–2, 6–7^{(5–7)}
Win	2–1	Jun 2008	Ukraine F1, Cherkassy	Futures	Clay	(Ukraine) Dmytro Petrov	7–6^{(7–5)}, 7–5
Win	3–1	Jun 2008	Ukraine F2, Cherkassy	Futures	Clay	(Ukraine) Denys Molchanov	6–4, 6–3
Loss	3–2	Jul 2008	Italy F20, Bologna	Futures	Clay	(Italy) Tomas Tenconi	7–6^{(7–5)}, 4–6, 3–6
Win	4–2	Mar 2010	Switzerland F1, Taverne	Futures	Carpet	(Germany) Marc Meigel	6–3, 6–3
Win	5–2	Sep 2010	Italy F24, Trieste	Futures	Clay	(Italy) Andrea Falgheri	7–5, 6–7^{(6–8)}, 6–3
Win	6–2	Sep 2010	Italy F25, Siena	Futures	Clay	(Italy) Filippo Leonardi	6–2, 1–6, 7–6^{(7–5)}
Loss	6–3	Sep 2010	Italy F26, Porto Torres	Futures	Hard	(Italy) Claudio Grassi	6–3, 4–6, 4–6
Loss	6–4	Oct 2010	Italy F30, Reggio Calabria	Futures	Clay	(Italy) Alessio di Mauro	6–7^{(4–7)}, 4–6
Win	7–4	Aug 2011	Italy F24, Piombino	Futures	Hard	(France) Josselin Ouanna	6–3, 6–2
Loss	7–5	Sep 2011	Italy F28, Brusaporto	Futures	Carpet	(Austria) Philipp Oswald	6–4, 4–6, 3–6
Win	8–5	May 2012	Italy F8, Bergamo	Futures	Clay	(Italy) Claudio Grassi	6–4, 6–3
Loss	8–6	May 2012	Italy F9, Pozzuoli	Futures	Clay	(Italy) Andrea Arnaboldi	1–6, 4–6
Win	9–6	Jun 2012	Italy F13, Padua	Futures	Clay	(Argentina) Jonathan Gonzalia	6–7^{(3–7)}, 6–3, 6–4
Loss	9–7	Jan 2014	Israel F1, Eilat	Futures	Hard	(France) Martin Vaïsse	6–7^{(3–7)}, 3–6
Win	10–7	Feb 2014	Italy F1, Sondrio	Futures	Hard	(Germany) Moritz Baumann	6–2, 7–5
Win	11–7	Feb 2014	Italy F2, Rovereto	Futures	Carpet	(Italy) Stefano Napolitano	6–3, 6–3
Win	12–7	May 2014	Italy F12, Santa Margherita Di Pula	Futures	Clay	(Italy) Alessio di Mauro	6–1, 3–1 ret.
Win	13–7	May 2014	Italy F13, Santa Margherita Di Pula	Futures	Clay	(Germany) Florian Fallert	7–5, 6–3
Win	14–7	Jun 2014	Italy F16, Cesena	Futures	Clay	(United States) Mitchell Krueger	4–6, 6–3, 6–1
Win	15–7	Jun 2014	Italy F18, Naples	Futures	Clay	(United States) Mitchell Krueger	6–3, 6–3
Win	16–7	Jul 2014	Italy F21, Mantua	Futures	Clay	(Slovakia) Ivo Klec	6–4, 6–4
Loss	16–8	Jul 2014	Kaohsiung, Taiwan	Challenger	Hard	(Chinese Taipei) Lu Yen-hsun	7–6^{(9–7)}, 4–6, 4–6
Win	17–8	Aug 2015	Portorož, Slovenia	Challenger	Hard	(Slovenia) Grega Žemlja	6–3, 7–6^{(8–6)}
Win	18–8	Jul 2016	Segovia, Spain	Challenger	Hard	(Ukraine) Illya Marchenko	6–4, 3–6, 6–3
Win	19–8	Nov 2016	Brescia, Italy	Challenger	Hard	(Lithuania) Laurynas Grigelis	6–7^{(5–7)}, 6–4, 7-6^{(10–8)}
Win	20–8	Nov 2016	Andria, Italy	Challenger	Hard	(Italy) Matteo Berrettini	5–7, 6–0, 6–3
Loss	20–9	Apr 2018	Italy F13, Santa Margherita Di Pula	Futures	Clay	(Argentina) Juan Pablo Ficovich	3–6, 6–7^{(5–7)}
Loss	20–10	May 2018	Glasgow, United Kingdom	Challenger	Hard	(Slovakia) Lukáš Lacko	6–4, 6–7^{(3–7)}, 4–6
Win	21–10	May 2018	Samarkand, Uzbekistan	Challenger	Clay	(Spain) Mario Vilella Martínez	6–4, 6–4

=== Doubles: 35 (15–20) ===
Legend ATP Challenger (1–3) ITF Futures (14–17)	Finals by surface Hard (1–7) Clay (12–11) Grass (0–0) Carpet (2–2)

Result	W–L	Date	Tournament	Tier	Surface	Partner	Opponents	Score
Loss	0–1	Jul 2006	Italy F22, Capri	Futures	Clay	(Russia) Sergei Demekhine	(Italy) Matteo Volante (Italy) Mattia Livraghi	6–1, 6–7^{(8–10)}, 4–6
Win	1–1	Jul 2006	Italy F23, Palazzolo	Futures	Clay	(Russia) Sergei Demekhine	(Chile) Guillermo Hormazábal (Chile) Hermes Gamonal	6–2, 6–3
Loss	1–2	May 2007	Italy F14, Naples	Futures	Clay	(Russia) Sergei Demekhine	(Argentina) Alejandro Fabbri (Argentina) Antonio Pastorino	1–6, 5–7
Win	2–2	Aug 2007	Italy F26, Avezzano	Futures	Clay	(Italy) Massimo Capone	(Morocco) Mehdi Ziadi (Morocco) Reda El Amrani	6–3, 6–0
Loss	2–3	Jan 2008	Austria F1, Bergheim	Futures	Carpet	(Italy) Massimo Dell'Acqua	(Poland) Marcin Gawron (Poland) Błażej Koniusz	3–6, 6–7^{(0–7)}
Win	3–3	May 2008	Bulgaria F1, Sofia	Futures	Clay	(Romania) Bogdan-Victor Leonte	(Belgium) Germain Gigounon (Belgium) Frederic de Fays	7–6^{(7–3)}, 6–3
Loss	3–4	Jun 2008	Norway F3, Oslo	Futures	Clay	(Italy) Fabio Colangelo	(France) Fabrice Martin (United States) Lance Vodicka	walkover
Loss	3–5	Aug 2008	Italy F27, Padua	Futures	Clay	(Italy) Alessandro da Col	(Croatia) Marin Bradarić (Croatia) Luka Belic	7–6^{(8–6)}, 6–7^{(3–7)}, [7–10]
Win	4–5	Mar 2009	Italia F3, Rome	Futures	Clay	(Italy) Daniele Giorgini	(Italy) Damiano Di Ienno (Bosnia and Herzegovina) Ismar Gorčić	2–6, 7–5, [10–8]
Loss	4–6	May 2009	Italy F12, Cesena	Futures	Clay	(Italy) Federico Torresi	(Spain) Guillermo Alcaide (Russia) Nikolai Nesterov	6–7^{(9–11)}, 6–3, [8–10]
Win	5–6	Jun 2009	Italia F16, Castelfranco	Futures	Clay	(Italy) Federico Torresi	(Austria) Richard Ruckelshausen (Austria) Bertram Steinberger	7–6^{(8–6)}, 6–7^{(5–7)}, [10–6]
Win	6–6	Aug 2009	Italia F24, Padua	Futures	Clay	(Italy) Federico Torresi	(Montenegro) Daniel Danilović (Montenegro) Goran Tošić	6–4, 6–3
Loss	6–7	Oct 2009	Italy F31, Naples	Futures	Hard	(Italy) Claudio Grassi	(Italy) Stefano Ianni (Italy) Matteo Volante	4–6, 6–1, [6–10]
Loss	6–8	Jun 2010	Italy F14, Aosta	Futures	Clay	(Italy) Federico Torresi	(United Kingdom) Morgan Phillips (Austria) Bertram Steinberger	5–7, 7–6^{(7–4)}, [11–13]
Loss	6–9	Sep 2010	Italy F25, Siena	Futures	Clay	(Italy) Federico Torresi	(Italy) Massimo Capone (Italy) Matteo Viola	6–7^{(2–7)}, 6–2, [2–10]
Loss	6–10	Mar 2011	Italy F2, Cividino	Futures	Hard	(Italy) Enrico Iannuzzi	(Italy) Enrico Fioravante (Colombia) Cristian Rodríguez	4–6, 6–7^{(16–18)}
Loss	6–11	Jun 2011	Italy F15, Viterbo	Futures	Clay	(Italy) Federico Torresi	(Sweden) Patrik Brydolf (Poland) Adam Chadaj	2–6, 6–1, [8–18]
Win	7–11	Jul 2011	Italy F19, Fano	Futures	Clay	(Italy) Stefano Ianni	(Mexico) César Ramírez (Australia) Nima Roshan	6–7^{(2–7)}, 6–3, [10–6]
Win	8–11	Aug 2011	Italy F24, Piombino	Futures	Hard	(Italy) Enrico Iannuzzi	(Italy) Matteo Volante (France) Simon Cauvard	6–4, 2–6, [10–4]
Win	9–11	Sep 2011	Todi, Italy	Challenger	Clay	(Italy) Stefano Ianni	(Austria) Martin Fischer (Italy) Alessandro Motti	6–4, 1–6, [11–9]
Win	10–11	Sep 2011	Italy F28, Brusaporto	Futures	Carpet	(Italy) Enrico Iannuzzi	(Italy) Matteo Volante (Croatia) Mate Pavić	6–3, 6–7^{(4–7)}, [11–9]
Win	11–11	Oct 2011	Morocco F8, Tanger	Futures	Clay	(Italy) Matteo Viola	(Czech Republic) Roman Jebavý (Czech Republic) Jan Šátral	6–3, 7–5
Loss	11–12	Jan 2012	Israel F3, Eilat	Futures	Hard	(Italy) Enrico Iannuzzi	(Austria) Dominic Thiem (Moldova) Maxim Dubarenco	6–7^{(5–7)}, 6–7^{(2–7)}
Loss	11–13	Mar 2012	Switzerland F1, Taverne	Futures	Carpet	(Italy) Enrico Iannuzzi	(Germany) Gero Kretschmer (Germany) Jakob Sude	4–6, 5–7
Loss	11–14	Jun 2012	Italy F13, Padua	Futures	Clay	(Italy) Marco Stancati	(Italy) Claudio Grassi (Italy) Matteo Volante	2–6, 0–6
Loss	11–15	Jul 2012	Lima, Peru	Challenger	Clay	(Italy) Claudio Grassi	(Argentina) Facundo Argüello (Argentina) Agustín Velotti	6–7^{(4–7)}, 6–7^{(5–7)}
Loss	11–16	Sep 2013	Italy F23, Piombino	Futures	Hard	(France) Antoine Benneteau	(Italy) Claudio Grassi (Italy) Riccardo Ghedin	4–6, 7–6^{(7–5)}, [7–10]
Win	12–16	Oct 2013	Italy F29, Palermo	Futures	Clay	(Italy) Walter Trusendi	(Italy) Riccardo Bonadio (Italy) Federico Maccari	6–2, 6–3
Win	13–16	Feb 2014	Italy F2, Rovereto	Futures	Carpet	(Italy) Marco Crugnola	(France) Fabrice Martin (France) Hugo Nys	6–4, 6–4
Loss	13–17	Apr 2014	Qatar F1, Doha	Futures	Hard	(Italy) Lorenzo Frigerio	(United Kingdom) Liam Broady (United Kingdom) Joshua Ward-Hibbert	3–6, 5–7
Loss	13–18	Apr 2014	Italy F11, Santa Margherita Di Pula	Futures	Clay	(Italy) Lorenzo Frigerio	(Spain) Albert Alcaraz Ivorra (Portugal) Gonçalo Oliveira	6–1, 5–7, [9–11]
Win	14–18	May 2014	Italy F12, Santa Margherita Di Pula	Futures	Clay	(Italy) Riccardo Sinicropi	(Italy) Daniele Giorgini (Italy) Matteo Volante	7–6^{(7–3)}, 7–5
Win	15–18	Jun 2014	Italy F16, Cesena	Futures	Clay	(Italy) Walter Trusendi	(Italy) Daniele Giorgini (Italy) Matteo Volante	6–4, 1–6, [12–10]
Loss	15–19	Sep 2015	Shanghai, China	Challenger	Hard	(Italy) Thomas Fabbiano	(China) Wu Di (Chinese Taipei) Yi Chu-huan	3–6, 5–7
Loss	15–20	Oct 2016	Brest, France	Challenger	Hard	(Switzerland) Marco Chiudinelli	(Netherlands) Sander Arends (Poland) Mateusz Kowalczyk	6–7^{(2–7)}, 6–3, [5–10]

== Performance timeline ==
Key
W	F	SF	QF	#R	RR	Q#	DNQ	A	NH

(W) winner; (F) finalist; (SF) semifinalist; (QF) quarterfinalist; (#R) rounds 4, 3, 2, 1; (RR) round-robin stage; (Q#) qualification round; (DNQ) did not qualify; (A) absent; (NH) not held; (SR) strike rate (events won / competed); (W–L) win–loss record.
To avoid confusion and double counting, these charts are updated at the conclusion of a tournament or when the player's participation has ended.

=== Singles ===
Tournament	2014	2015	2016	2017	2018	2019	2020	2021	SR	W–L	Win %
Grand Slam tournaments
Australian Open	A	Q2	Q1	1R	Q1	1R	A	A	0 / 2	0–2	0%
French Open	A	1R	Q1	Q2	A	A	A	A	0 / 1	0–1	0%
Wimbledon	A	1R	Q1	Q1	Q3	Q1	NH	A	0 / 1	0–1	0%
US Open	Q1	Q2	Q1	Q1	Q1	A	A	A	0 / 0	0–0	–
Win–loss	0–0	0–2	0–0	0–1	0–0	0–1	0–0	0–0	0 / 4	0–4	33%
ATP Tour Masters 1000
Indian Wells Masters	A	A	A	A	A	Q1	NH	A	0 / 0	0–0	–
Miami Masters	A	Q1	Q1	A	A	Q1	A	A	0 / 0	0–0	–
Monte Carlo	A	Q1	A	A	A	A	NH	A	0 / 0	0–0	–
Madrid	A	2R	A	A	A	A	NH	A	0 / 1	1–1	50%
Rome Masters	A	1R	Q1	Q1	A	A	A	A	0 / 1	0–1	0%
Win–loss	0–0	1–2	0–0	0–0	0–0	0–0	0–0	0–0	0 / 2	1–2	33%
