= Aljaž Radinski =

Slovenian tennis player

- Country (sports): Slovenia
- Born: 8 June 1995 (age 30) Maribor, Slovenia
- Height: 1.88 m (6 ft 2 in)
- Plays: Right-handed (two-handed backhand)
- Prize money: $11,837

Singles
- Career record: 1–0 (at ATP Tour level, Grand Slam level, and in Davis Cup)
- Career titles: 0
- Highest ranking: No. 802 (11 July 2016)
- Current ranking: No. 1,843 (24 December 2018)

Doubles
- Career record: 0–1 (at ATP Tour level, Grand Slam level, and in Davis Cup)
- Career titles: 0
- Highest ranking: No. 974 (8 August 2016)
- Current ranking: No. 1,494 (24 December 2018)

Team competitions
- Davis Cup: 1–1
- Last updated on: 24 December 2018.

Aljaž Radinski (born 8 June 1995) is a Slovenian tennis player.

== Career ==
Radinski has a career high ATP singles ranking of 802 achieved on 11 July 2016 and a career high ATP doubles ranking of 974, achieved on 8 August 2016.

Radinski has represented Slovenia at the Davis Cup, where he has a win-loss record of 1–1.

== Future and Challenger finals ==
=== Doubles 1 (0 titles, 1 runners-up) ===
Legend
Challengers 0 (0–0)
Futures 1 (0–1)

| Result | No. | Date | Tournament | Surface | Partner | Opponents | Score |
|---|---|---|---|---|---|---|---|
| Runner-up | 1. | 24 April 2016 | Szeged, Hungary F1 | Clay | (Slovenia) Tomislav Ternar | (Austria) Lucas Miedler (Italy) Gianluigi Quinzi | 6–7^{(5–7)}, 2–6 |
