= 2019 ITF Men's World Tennis Tour =

Details
- Duration: 31 December 2018 – 5 January 2020
- Edition: 22nd
- Tournaments: 540
- Categories: M25 tournaments (155); M15 tournaments (385)

Achievements (singles)
- Most titles: (Egypt) Karim-Mohamed Maamoun (Russia) Ivan Nedelko (Kazakhstan) Dmitry Popko (7)
- Most finals: (Australia) Christopher O'Connell (10)

The 2019 ITF Men's World Tennis Tour is the 2019 edition of the third-tier tour for men's professional tennis. It is organised by the International Tennis Federation and is a tier below the ATP Challenger Tour. The ITF Men's World Tennis Tour includes tournaments with prize money ranging from $15,000 up to $25,000. The ITF Men's World Tennis Tour is the product of reforms designed to support talented junior players in their progression to the senior game, and target the prize money effectively at professional tournaments to enable more players to make a living.

== Participating host nations ==
- Argentina (ARG)
- Australia (AUS)
- Austria (AUT)
- Bahrain (BHR)
- Belarus (BLR)
- Belgium (BEL)
- Bolivia (BOL)
- Bosnia and Herzegovina (BIH)
- Brazil (BRA)
- Bulgaria (BUL)
- Chile (CHI)
- China (CHN)
- Chinese Taipei (TPE)
- Colombia (COL)
- Croatia (CRO)
- Czech Republic (CZE)
- Dominican Republic (DOM)
- Ecuador (ECU)
- Egypt (EGY)
- El Salvador (ESA)
- Estonia (EST)
- Finland (FIN)
- France (FRA)
- Georgia (GEO)
- Germany (GER)
- Ghana (GHA)
- Great Britain (GBR)
- Greece (GRE)
- Guam (GUM)
- Hong Kong (HKG)
- Hungary (HUN)
- Indonesia (INA)
- Ireland (IRL)
- Israel (ISR)
- Italy (ITA)
- Japan (JPN)
- Kazakhstan (KAZ)
- Kuwait (KUW)
- Lebanon (LBN)
- Lithuania (LTU)
- Mexico (MEX)
- Morocco (MAR)
- Mozambique (MOZ)
- Netherlands (NED)
- New Zealand (NZL)
- Nigeria (NGR)
- Norway (NOR)
- Paraguay (PAR)
- Peru (PER)
- Poland (POL)
- Portugal (POR)
- Qatar (QAT)
- Romania (ROU)
- Russia (RUS)
- Serbia (SRB)
- Singapore (SGP)
- Slovakia (SVK)
- South Africa (RSA)
- South Korea (KOR)
- Spain (ESP)
- Sweden (SWE)
- Switzerland (SUI)
- Thailand (THA)
- Tunisia (TUN)
- Turkey (TUR)
- Uganda (UGA)
- Ukraine (UKR)
- United States (USA)
- Uruguay (URU)
- Uzbekistan (UZB)
- Vietnam (VIE)
- Zimbabwe (ZIM)

== Tournament breakdown by event category ==
Event category	Number of events	Total prize money
$25,000	155	$3,875,000
$15,000	385	$5,775,000
Total	540	$9,650,000

== Ranking points distribution ==
Category	W	F	SF	QF	R16	R32	Q	Q2	Q1
↓ ATP Ranking Points ↓
M25+H (S) / M25 (S)	20	12	6	3	1	–	–	–	–
M25+H (D) / M25 (D)	20	12	6	3	–	–	–	–	–
M15+H (S) / M15 (S)	10	6	4	2	1	–	–	–	–
M15+H (D) / M15 (D)	10	6	4	2	–	–	–	–	–
↓ ITF World Tennis Ranking Points ↓
M25+H (S)	225	135	67	27	9	0	4	1	–
M25+H (D)	225	135	67	9	0	–	–	–	–
M25 (S)	150	90	45	18	6	0	3	1	–
M25 (D)	150	90	45	6	0	–	–	–	–
M15+H (S)	150	90	45	18	6	0	3	1	–
M15+H (D)	150	90	45	6	0	–	–	–	–
M15 (S)	100	60	30	12	4	0	2	1	–
M15 (D)	100	60	30	4	0	–	–	–	–

- "+H" indicates that hospitality is provided.

== Prize money distribution ==
Category	W	F	SF	QF	R16	R32
M25+H (S) / M25 (S)	$3,600	$2,120	$1,255	$730	$430	$260
M25+H (D) / M25 (D)	$1,550	$900	$540	$320	$180	–
M15+H (S) / M15 (S)	$2,160	$1,272	$753	$438	$258	$156
M15+H (D) / M15 (D)	$930	$540	$324	$192	$108	–

- Doubles prize money per team

== Statistics ==
These tables present the number of singles (S) and doubles (D) titles won by each player and each nation during the season. The players/nations are sorted by:

1. Total number of titles (a doubles title won by two players representing the same nation counts as only one win for the nation)
2. A singles > doubles hierarchy
3. Alphabetical order (by family names for players).

To avoid confusion and double counting, these tables should be updated only after all events of the week are completed.

=== Titles won by player ===
2019 Titles won by player

Total	Player	M25		M15		Total	
Total	Player	S	D	S	D	S	D
14	Felipe Meligeni Alves (BRA)		3	3	8	3	11
12	Skander Mansouri (TUN)	1	3	4	4	5	7
11	Rafael Matos (BRA)		3	1	7	1	10
10	Dan Added (FRA)	2	3	1	4	3	7
10	Orlando Luz (BRA)	2	2	1	5	3	7
10	Mircea-Alexandru Jecan (ROU)		3	3	4	3	7
10	Alejandro Gómez (COL)		7	1	2	1	9
10	Arklon Huertas del Pino (PER)			1	9	1	9
9	Hernán Casanova (ARG)		1	4	4	4	5
9	Benjamin Lock (ZIM)		1	2	6	2	7
8	Dmitry Popko (KAZ)	2		5	1	7	1
8	Junior Alexander Ore (USA)		7		1	0	8
8	Conner Huertas del Pino (PER)				8	0	8
7	Karim-Mohamed Maamoun (EGY)			7		7	0
7	Ivan Nedelko (RUS)			7		7	0
7	Geoffrey Blancaneaux (FRA)			4	3	4	3
7	Botic van de Zandschulp (NED)	3	2		2	3	4
7	Eduardo Struvay (COL)	2	1	1	3	3	4
7	Michael Vrbenský (CZE)	1	2	2	2	3	4
7	Shintaro Imai (JPN)	1	1	2	3	3	4
7	Jesper de Jong (NED)	1	1	2	3	3	4
7	Pablo Vivero González (ESP)	1		2	4	3	4
7	Jeroen Vanneste (BEL)	2	2		3	2	5
7	Aziz Dougaz (TUN)		4	2	1	2	5
7	Markus Eriksson (SWE)		1	2	4	2	5
7	Vladyslav Manafov (UKR)		5		2	0	7
7	Julian Bradley (IRL)		2		5	0	7
6	Francisco Cerúndolo (ARG)	2		3	1	5	1
6	Enrico Dalla Valle (ITA)	1		3	2	4	2
6	Oriol Roca Batalla (ESP)	1	2	2	1	3	3
6	Tomás Martín Etcheverry (ARG)	1	1	2	2	3	3
6	Manuel Guinard (FRA)	1	1	2	2	3	3
6	Igor Sijsling (NED)	1	1	2	2	3	3
6	Oscar José Gutierrez (BRA)	1		2	3	3	3
6	Kacper Żuk (POL)	1		2	3	3	3
6	Evan Hoyt (GBR)		2	3	1	3	3
6	Eduard Esteve Lobato (ESP)		1	3	2	3	3
6	Corentin Denolly (FRA)		1	3	2	3	3
6	Nicolás Mejía (COL)		2	2	2	2	4
6	Antoine Bellier (SUI)		1	2	3	2	4
6	Matías Zukas (ARG)			2	4	2	4
6	Fábián Marozsán (HUN)		1	1	4	1	5
6	David Pichler (AUT)		1	1	4	1	5
6	Marco Bortolotti (ITA)		3		3	0	6
6	George Goldhoff (USA)		1		5	0	6
6	Courtney John Lock (ZIM)		1		5	0	6
6	Jan Zieliński (POL)		1		5	0	6
6	Mats Hermans (NED)				6	0	6
6	Alexander Igoshin (RUS)				6	0	6
6	Bart Stevens (NED)				6	0	6
5	Bai Yan (CHN)	5				5	0
5	Matija Pecotić (CRO)	1		4		5	0
5	Lukáš Klein (SVK)			5		5	0
5	Hugo Gaston (FRA)	4	1			4	1
5	Dayne Kelly (AUS)	3	1	1		4	1
5	Hong Seong-chan (KOR)			4	1	4	1
5	Nicholas David Ionel (ROU)			4	1	4	1
5	Gonzalo Villanueva (ARG)			4	1	4	1
5	Yuta Shimizu (JPN)	2	2	1		3	2
5	Juan Pablo Varillas (PER)	2	2	1		3	2
5	Jumpei Yamasaki (JPN)		1	3	1	3	2
5	Máté Valkusz (HUN)			3	2	3	2
5	Sun Fajing (CHN)	2	3			2	3
5	Pedro Sakamoto (BRA)	1	3	1		2	3
5	Mārtiņš Podžus (LAT)	1	1	1	2	2	3
5	Axel Geller (ARG)		2	2	1	2	3
5	Diego Hidalgo (ECU)		1	2	2	2	3
5	Michail Pervolarakis (GRE)		1	2	2	2	3
5	Marek Gengel (CZE)			2	3	2	3
5	Vladyslav Orlov (UKR)			2	3	2	3
5	David Poljak (CZE)			2	3	2	3
5	Andrés Artuñedo (ESP)	1	1		3	1	4
5	Filip Bergevi (SWE)		1	1	3	1	4
5	Maximiliano Estévez (ARG)		1	1	3	1	4
5	Manuel Peña López (ARG)		1	1	3	1	4
5	Nicolás Alberto Arreche (ARG)			1	4	1	4
5	Simon Freund (SWE)			1	4	1	4
5	Sanchai Ratiwatana (THA)		4		1	0	5
5	Sonchat Ratiwatana (THA)		4		1	0	5
5	Ivan Liutarevich (BLR)		3		2	0	5
5	Boris Arias (BOL)		2		3	0	5
5	Luke Johnson (GBR)		2		3	0	5
5	Albano Olivetti (FRA)		2		3	0	5
5	Ivan Sabanov (CRO)		2		3	0	5
5	Matej Sabanov (CRO)		2		3	0	5
5	Brandon Walkin (AUS)		2		3	0	5
5	Mick Lescure (FRA)		1		4	0	5
5	Maxim Ratniuk (RUS)		1		4	0	5
5	Maxime Tchoutakian (FRA)		1		4	0	5
5	Tomás Lipovšek Puches (SLO)				5	0	5
5	Oleg Prihodko (UKR)				5	0	5
4	Daniel Altmaier (GER)	1		3		4	0
4	Sebastián Báez (ARG)	1		3		4	0
4	Harry Bourchier (AUS)	1		3		4	0
4	Juan Pablo Ficovich (ARG)	1		3		4	0
4	Hugo Grenier (FRA)	1		3		4	0
4	Maxime Hamou (FRA)	1		3		4	0
4	Sandro Ehrat (SUI)			4		4	0
4	Christopher Heyman (BEL)			4		4	0
4	Yshai Oliel (ISR)			4		4	0
4	Marko Tepavac (SRB)			4		4	0
4	Nicolás Álvarez (PER)	3	1			3	1
4	Roberto Cid Subervi (DOM)	3	1			3	1
4	Tim van Rijthoven (NED)	3	1			3	1
4	Roman Safiullin (RUS)	3	1			3	1
4	Jack Draper (GBR)	3			1	3	1
4	Christian Lindell (SWE)	3			1	3	1
4	Laurent Lokoli (FRA)	3			1	3	1
4	Václav Šafránek (CZE)	1	1	2		3	1
4	Agustín Velotti (ARG)	1		2	1	3	1
4	Arthur Rinderknech (FRA)			3	1	3	1
4	Petros Chrysochos (CYP)	2	2			2	2
4	Michael Geerts (BEL)	2			2	2	2
4	Evgenii Tiurnev (RUS)	1	1	1	1	2	2
4	Antoine Escoffier (FRA)	1		1	2	2	2
4	Alexander Erler (AUT)		1	2	1	2	2
4	Vít Kopřiva (CZE)		1	2	1	2	2
4	Alexey Zakharov (RUS)		1	2	1	2	2
4	Duje Ajduković (CRO)			2	2	2	2
4	Bogdan Bobrov (RUS)			2	2	2	2
4	Artem Dubrivnyy (RUS)			2	2	2	2
4	Sadio Doumbia (FRA)	1	3			1	3
4	Brydan Klein (GBR)	1	3			1	3
4	Jaume Pla Malfeito (ESP)	1	2		1	1	3
4	Laurynas Grigelis (LTU)	1			3	1	3
4	Jonathan Eysseric (FRA)		3	1		1	3
4	Alexander Cozbinov (MDA)		2	1	1	1	3
4	Hsu Yu-hsiou (TPE)		1	1	2	1	3
4	Mats Rosenkranz (GER)		1	1	2	1	3
4	Alec Adamson (USA)			1	3	1	3
4	Zizou Bergs (BEL)			1	3	1	3
4	Marat Deviatiarov (UKR)			1	3	1	3
4	Francesco Forti (ITA)			1	3	1	3
4	Nick Hardt (DOM)			1	3	1	3
4	Jonathan Mridha (SWE)			1	3	1	3
4	David Pérez Sanz (ESP)			1	3	1	3
4	Vitaliy Sachko (UKR)			1	3	1	3
4	Constantin Schmitz (GER)			1	3	1	3
4	Hunter Johnson (USA)		4			0	4
4	Yates Johnson (USA)		4			0	4
4	Scott Puodziunas (AUS)		4			0	4
4	Victor Vlad Cornea (ROU)		3		1	0	4
4	Sergio Martos Gornés (ESP)		2		2	0	4
4	Ryan Nijboer (NED)		2		2	0	4
4	Calum Puttergill (AUS)		2		2	0	4
4	Song Min-kyu (KOR)		2		2	0	4
4	Camilo Ugo Carabelli (ARG)		2		2	0	4
4	Petr Nouza (CZE)		1		3	0	4
4	Clément Tabur (FRA)		1		3	0	4
4	Franco Feitt (ARG)				4	0	4
4	Anis Ghorbel (TUN)				4	0	4
4	Mariano Kestelboim (ARG)				4	0	4
4	Petr Michnev (CZE)				4	0	4
4	Austin Rapp (USA)				4	0	4
4	Federico Zeballos (BOL)				4	0	4
3	Jenson Brooksby (USA)	3				3	0
3	Nerman Fatić (BIH)	2		1		3	0
3	Calvin Hemery (FRA)	2		1		3	0
3	Shuichi Sekiguchi (JPN)	2		1		3	0
3	Christopher O'Connell (AUS)	1		2		3	0
3	Juan Manuel Cerúndolo (ARG)			3		3	0
3	Dimitar Kuzmanov (BUL)			3		3	0
3	Benjamin Bonzi (FRA)	2	1			2	1
3	Genaro Alberto Olivieri (ARG)	1		1	1	2	1
3	Lorenzo Musetti (ITA)		1	2		2	1
3	Nuno Borges (POR)			2	1	2	1
3	Jan Choinski (GBR)			2	1	2	1
3	Fred Gil (POR)			2	1	2	1
3	Álvaro López San Martín (ESP)			2	1	2	1
3	Gerardo López Villaseñor (MEX)			2	1	2	1
3	Daniel Michalski (POL)			2	1	2	1
3	Ignacio Monzón (ARG)			2	1	2	1
3	Ricardo Ojeda Lara (ESP)			2	1	2	1
3	Fabrizio Ornago (ITA)			2	1	2	1
3	Lamine Ouahab (MAR)			2	1	2	1
3	Louis Wessels (GER)			2	1	2	1
3	Maxime Cressy (USA)	1	2			1	2
3	Jonáš Forejtek (CZE)	1	2			1	2
3	Tom Jomby (FRA)	1	2			1	2
3	Sanjar Fayziev (UZB)	1	1		1	1	2
3	Niels Lootsma (NED)	1			2	1	2
3	Adam Moundir (MAR)	1			2	1	2
3	Sekou Bangoura (USA)		2	1		1	2
3	Denis Yevseyev (KAZ)		2	1		1	2
3	Andrey Golubev (KAZ)		1	1	1	1	2
3	Danylo Kalenichenko (UKR)		1	1	1	1	2
3	Matteo Martineau (FRA)		1	1	1	1	2
3	Martin Redlicki (USA)		1	1	1	1	2
3	Cristian Rodríguez (COL)		1	1	1	1	2
3	Arnaud Bovy (BEL)			1	2	1	2
3	Alexander Donski (BUL)			1	2	1	2
3	Juan Sebastián Gómez (COL)			1	2	1	2
3	Michal Konečný (CZE)			1	2	1	2
3	Péter Nagy (HUN)			1	2	1	2
3	Gauthier Onclin (BEL)			1	2	1	2
3	Jorge Panta (PER)			1	2	1	2
3	Kelsey Stevenson (CAN)			1	2	1	2
3	Mark Whitehouse (GBR)			1	2	1	2
3	Fabien Reboul (FRA)		3			0	3
3	Lloyd Glasspool (GBR)		2		1	0	3
3	Konstantin Kravchuk (RUS)		2		1	0	3
3	Florian Lakat (FRA)		2		1	0	3
3	Jack Findel-Hawkins (GBR)		1		2	0	3
3	James Frawley (AUS)		1		2	0	3
3	Guy Orly Iradukunda (BDI)		1		2	0	3
3	Yanais Laurent (FRA)		1		2	0	3
3	Grigoriy Lomakin (KAZ)		1		2	0	3
3	Piotr Matuszewski (POL)		1		2	0	3
3	Alexander Merino (PER)		1		2	0	3
3	Nam Ji-sung (KOR)		1		2	0	3
3	Bernardo Saraiva (POR)		1		2	0	3
3	Adelchi Virgili (ITA)		1		2	0	3
3	Leonardo Aboian (ARG)				3	0	3
3	Julian Cash (GBR)				3	0	3
3	Anirudh Chandrasekar (IND)				3	0	3
3	Henry Craig (USA)				3	0	3
3	Hiroyasu Ehara (JPN)				3	0	3
3	Luca Gelhardt (GER)				3	0	3
3	Ray Ho (TPE)				3	0	3
3	Majed Kilani (TUN)				3	0	3
3	Mikhail Korovin (RUS)				3	0	3
3	Michiel de Krom (NED)				3	0	3
3	Raheel Manji (CAN)				3	0	3
3	Igor Marcondes (BRA)				3	0	3
3	Christoph Negritu (GER)				3	0	3
3	Jakub Paul (SUI)				3	0	3
3	Yan Sabanin (RUS)				3	0	3
3	Benjamín Winter López (ESP)				3	0	3
2	Maxime Chazal (FRA)	2				2	0
2	Evan Furness (FRA)	2				2	0
2	Blake Mott (AUS)	2				2	0
2	Govind Nanda (USA)	2				2	0
2	Daniel Nguyen (USA)	2				2	0
2	Jules Okala (FRA)	2				2	0
2	Jannik Sinner (ITA)	2				2	0
2	Renta Tokuda (JPN)	2				2	0
2	Carlos Gimeno Valero (ESP)	1		1		2	0
2	Filip Cristian Jianu (ROU)	1		1		2	0
2	Emil Ruusuvuori (FIN)	1		1		2	0
2	Nikolás Sánchez Izquierdo (ESP)	1		1		2	0
2	Albert Alcaraz Ivorra (ESP)			2		2	0
2	Jordi Arconada (USA)			2		2	0
2	Altuğ Çelikbilek (TUR)			2		2	0
2	Peter Heller (GER)			2		2	0
2	Ergi Kırkın (TUR)			2		2	0
2	Anton Matusevich (GBR)			2		2	0
2	Facundo Mena (ARG)			2		2	0
2	Marko Miladinović (SRB)			2		2	0
2	Lény Mitjana (FRA)			2		2	0
2	Makoto Ochi (JPN)			2		2	0
2	Ryan Peniston (GBR)			2		2	0
2	Quentin Robert (FRA)			2		2	0
2	Ronald Slobodchikov (RUS)			2		2	0
2	Thiemo de Bakker (NED)	1	1			1	1
2	Brandon Holt (USA)	1	1			1	1
2	Julian Lenz (GER)	1	1			1	1
2	Arthur Reymond (FRA)	1	1			1	1
2	Sam Riffice (USA)	1	1			1	1
2	Thiago Seyboth Wild (BRA)	1	1			1	1
2	Alejandro Tabilo (CHI)	1	1			1	1
2	Giulio Zeppieri (ITA)	1	1			1	1
2	Wilson Leite (BRA)	1			1	1	1
2	Yannick Mertens (BEL)	1			1	1	1
2	Alexander Ritschard (USA)	1			1	1	1
2	Peter Torebko (GER)	1			1	1	1
2	Elmar Ejupovic (GER)		1	1		1	1
2	Gilbert Klier Júnior (BRA)		1	1		1	1
2	Harold Mayot (FRA)		1	1		1	1
2	Nathan Ponwith (USA)		1	1		1	1
2	Jan Šátral (CZE)		1	1		1	1
2	Luke Saville (AUS)		1	1		1	1
2	Khumoyun Sultanov (UZB)		1	1		1	1
2	Alessandro Bega (ITA)			1	1	1	1
2	Simon Carr (IRL)			1	1	1	1
2	Lucas Catarina (MON)			1	1	1	1
2	Ivan Davydov (RUS)			1	1	1	1
2	Shalva Dzhanashiya (RUS)			1	1	1	1
2	Nicolae Frunză (ROU)			1	1	1	1
2	Juan Ignacio Galarza (ARG)			1	1	1	1
2	Gustav Hansson (SWE)			1	1	1	1
2	Haru Inoue (JPN)			1	1	1	1
2	Ronan Joncour (FRA)			1	1	1	1
2	Yuta Kawahashi (JPN)			1	1	1	1
2	Gengo Kikuchi (JPN)			1	1	1	1
2	Vasil Kirkov (USA)			1	1	1	1
2	Georgii Kravchenko (UKR)			1	1	1	1
2	Alexandar Lazarov (BUL)			1	1	1	1
2	Bastián Malla (CHI)			1	1	1	1
2	Mateo Nicolás Martínez (ARG)			1	1	1	1
2	Aidan McHugh (GBR)			1	1	1	1
2	Yuki Mochizuki (JPN)			1	1	1	1
2	Johan Nikles (SUI)			1	1	1	1
2	Joshua Ortlip (USA)			1	1	1	1
2	Andrew Paulson (CZE)			1	1	1	1
2	João Lucas Reis da Silva (BRA)			1	1	1	1
2	Justin Roberts (BAH)			1	1	1	1
2	Ricardo Rodríguez (VEN)			1	1	1	1
2	Sho Shimabukuro (JPN)			1	1	1	1
2	Shin San-hui (KOR)			1	1	1	1
2	Robin Staněk (CZE)			1	1	1	1
2	Ryota Tanuma (JPN)			1	1	1	1
2	Pol Toledo Bagué (ESP)			1	1	1	1
2	Miljan Zekić (SRB)			1	1	1	1
2	Juan Carlos Aguilar (BOL)		2			0	2
2	José Daniel Bendeck (COL)		2			0	2
2	Teymuraz Gabashvili (RUS)		2			0	2
2	Korey Lovett (USA)		2			0	2
2	Alexander Pavlioutchenkov (RUS)		2			0	2
2	Wang Aoran (CHN)		2			0	2
2	Wu Hao (CHN)		2			0	2
2	Harrison Adams (USA)		1		1	0	2
2	Alberto Barroso Campos (ESP)		1		1	0	2
2	Jacopo Berrettini (ITA)		1		1	0	2
2	Gábor Borsos (HUN)		1		1	0	2
2	Daniel Dutra da Silva (BRA)		1		1	0	2
2	Lorenzo Frigerio (ITA)		1		1	0	2
2	Mikhail Fufygin (RUS)		1		1	0	2
2	Sora Fukuda (JPN)		1		1	0	2
2	Hua Runhao (CHN)		1		1	0	2
2	Marek Jaloviec (CZE)		1		1	0	2
2	Ben Jones (GBR)		1		1	0	2
2	Timur Khabibulin (KAZ)		1		1	0	2
2	Jaroslav Pospíšil (CZE)		1		1	0	2
2	Rhett Purcell (NZL)		1		1	0	2
2	João Pedro Sorgi (BRA)		1		1	0	2
2	Naoki Tajima (JPN)		1		1	0	2
2	Peter Bothwell (IRL)				2	0	2
2	Justin Butsch (USA)				2	0	2
2	Francisco Cabral (POR)				2	0	2
2	Luca Castelnuovo (SUI)				2	0	2
2	Chen Ti (TPE)				2	0	2
2	Choi Jae-won (KOR)				2	0	2
2	Chung Hong (KOR)				2	0	2
2	Gonçalo Falcão (POR)				2	0	2
2	Quentin Folliot (FRA)				2	0	2
2	David Fox (GBR)				2	0	2
2	Luke Jacob Gamble (USA)				2	0	2
2	Wilfredo González (GUA)				2	0	2
2	Patrick Grigoriu (ROU)				2	0	2
2	Niklas Guttau (GER)				2	0	2
2	Gabriel Alejandro Hidalgo (ARG)				2	0	2
2	Max Houkes (NED)				2	0	2
2	Vladimir Ivanov (EST)				2	0	2
2	Guido Iván Justo (ARG)				2	0	2
2	Sho Katayama (JPN)				2	0	2
2	Strong Kirchheimer (USA)				2	0	2
2	Timur Kiyamov (RUS)				2	0	2
2	Vladimir Korolev (RUS)				2	0	2
2	Ondřej Krstev (CZE)				2	0	2
2	George von Massow (GER)				2	0	2
2	Shintaro Mochizuki (JPN)				2	0	2
2	Moon Ju-hae (KOR)				2	0	2
2	Federico Moreno (ARG)				2	0	2
2	Soichiro Moritani (JPN)				2	0	2
2	Jordi Muñoz Abreu (VEN)				2	0	2
2	Lasse Muscheites (GER)				2	0	2
2	Patrik Niklas-Salminen (FIN)				2	0	2
2	José Olivares (DOM)				2	0	2
2	Jānis Podžus (LAT)				2	0	2
2	Vijay Sundar Prashanth (IND)				2	0	2
2	Stefan Seifert (GER)				2	0	2
2	Alexander Shevchenko (RUS)				2	0	2
2	Tanner Smith (USA)				2	0	2
2	Maciej Smoła (POL)				2	0	2
2	Reese Stalder (USA)				2	0	2
2	Yannik Steinegger (SUI)				2	0	2
2	Kento Takeuchi (JPN)				2	0	2
2	Maksim Tikhomirov (USA)				2	0	2
2	Dennis Uspensky (USA)				2	0	2
2	Yann Wójcik (POL)				2	0	2
2	Tyler Zink (USA)				2	0	2
1	Carlos Alcaraz (ESP)	1				1	0
1	Riccardo Balzerani (ITA)	1				1	0
1	Javier Barranco Cosano (ESP)	1				1	0
1	Marcelo Tomás Barrios Vera (CHI)	1				1	0
1	Raúl Brancaccio (ITA)	1				1	0
1	Frederico Ferreira Silva (POR)	1				1	0
1	Lucas Gerch (GER)	1				1	0
1	José Hernández-Fernández (DOM)	1				1	0
1	Jurabek Karimov (UZB)	1				1	0
1	Daniel Masur (GER)	1				1	0
1	Alexandre Müller (FRA)	1				1	0
1	Sidharth Rawat (IND)	1				1	0
1	Patrik Rikl (CZE)	1				1	0
1	Rayane Roumane (FRA)	1				1	0
1	Alex Rybakov (USA)	1				1	0
1	Bruno Sant'Anna (BRA)	1				1	0
1	Collin Altamirano (USA)			1		1	0
1	Mateus Alves (BRA)			1		1	0
1	Peter Bertran (DOM)			1		1	0
1	Yan Bondarevskiy (RUS)			1		1	0
1	Gage Brymer (USA)			1		1	0
1	Daniele Capecchi (ITA)			1		1	0
1	Nick Chappell (USA)			1		1	0
1	Savriyan Danilov (RUS)			1		1	0
1	Facundo Díaz Acosta (ARG)			1		1	0
1	Viktor Durasovic (NOR)			1		1	0
1	Mauricio Echazú (PER)			1		1	0
1	Adam El Mihdawy (USA)			1		1	0
1	Edris Fetisleam (ROU)			1		1	0
1	Sergey Fomin (UZB)			1		1	0
1	Takanyi Garanganga (ZIM)			1		1	0
1	Alexis Gautier (FRA)			1		1	0
1	Tigre Hank (MEX)			1		1	0
1	Rinky Hijikata (AUS)			1		1	0
1	Youssef Hossam (EGY)			1		1	0
1	Paul Jubb (GBR)			1		1	0
1	Aslan Karatsev (RUS)			1		1	0
1	Christian Langmo (USA)			1		1	0
1	Thomas Laurent (FRA)			1		1	0
1	Lee Duck-hee (KOR)			1		1	0
1	Imanol López Morillo (ESP)			1		1	0
1	Tomáš Macháč (CZE)			1		1	0
1	Antonio Cayetano March (ECU)			1		1	0
1	Pol Martín Tiffon (ESP)			1		1	0
1	Nikita Mashtakov (UKR)			1		1	0
1	Mo Yecong (CHN)			1		1	0
1	Marvin Netuschil (GER)			1		1	0
1	Adrian Obert (GER)			1		1	0
1	Juan Bautista Otegui (ARG)			1		1	0
1	Andrea Pellegrino (ITA)			1		1	0
1	Matthieu Perchicot (FRA)			1		1	0
1	Boris Pokotilov (RUS)			1		1	0
1	Lucas Poullain (FRA)			1		1	0
1	Nik Razboršek (SLO)			1		1	0
1	Santiago Rodríguez Taverna (ARG)			1		1	0
1	Pietro Rondoni (ITA)			1		1	0
1	Nathan Seateun (FRA)			1		1	0
1	Tobias Simon (GER)			1		1	0
1	Colin Sinclair (NMI)			1		1	0
1	Artem Smirnov (UKR)			1		1	0
1	Carl Söderlund (SWE)			1		1	0
1	Ryan James Storrie (GBR)			1		1	0
1	Kristjan Tamm (EST)			1		1	0
1	Finn Tearney (NZL)			1		1	0
1	Eric Vanshelboim (UKR)			1		1	0
1	Mick Veldheer (NED)			1		1	0
1	Dimitriy Voronin (RUS)			1		1	0
1	Paul Wörner (GER)			1		1	0
1	Wu Tung-lin (TPE)			1		1	0
1	Alexander Zhurbin (RUS)			1		1	0
1	Jürgen Zopp (EST)			1		1	0
1	Matteo Arnaldi (ITA)		1			0	1
1	Martin Beran (CAN)		1			0	1
1	Gijs Brouwer (NED)		1			0	1
1	Liam Caruana (ITA)		1			0	1
1	Íñigo Cervantes (ESP)		1			0	1
1	Anton Chekhov (RUS)		1			0	1
1	Antoine Cornut-Chauvinc (FRA)		1			0	1
1	Oliver Crawford (USA)		1			0	1
1	Daniel Cukierman (ISR)		1			0	1
1	Jake Delaney (AUS)		1			0	1
1	Ian Dempster (USA)		1			0	1
1	Karol Drzewiecki (POL)		1			0	1
1	Pierre Faivre (FRA)		1			0	1
1	Elliott Farmer (GBR)		1			0	1
1	Giovanni Fonio (ITA)		1			0	1
1	Sergio Galdós (PER)		1			0	1
1	Gao Xin (CHN)		1			0	1
1	Alejandro González (COL)		1			0	1
1	Alastair Gray (GBR)		1			0	1
1	Shinji Hazawa (JPN)		1			0	1
1	Milen Ianakiev (GER)		1			0	1
1	Huang Tsung-hao (TPE)		1			0	1
1	Grégoire Jacq (FRA)		1			0	1
1	Hendrik Jebens (GER)		1			0	1
1	Alexander Jhun (GBR)		1			0	1
1	Yuya Kibi (JPN)		1			0	1
1	Sebastian Korda (USA)		1			0	1
1	Mateusz Kowalczyk (POL)		1			0	1
1	Sergis Kyratzis (CYP)		1			0	1
1	Edan Leshem (ISR)		1			0	1
1	Lin Wei-de (TPE)		1			0	1
1	Denis Matsukevich (RUS)		1			0	1
1	Jan Mertl (CZE)		1			0	1
1	Ewan Moore (GBR)		1			0	1
1	Rio Noguchi (JPN)		1			0	1
1	Julian Ocleppo (ITA)		1			0	1
1	Roberto Ortega Olmedo (ESP)		1			0	1
1	Tadeáš Paroulek (CZE)		1			0	1
1	Giorgio Portaluri (ITA)		1			0	1
1	Joffrey de Schepper (FRA)		1			0	1
1	David Škoch (CZE)		1			0	1
1	Glenn Smits (NED)		1			0	1
1	Evan Song (USA)		1			0	1
1	Robert Strombachs (GER)		1			0	1
1	Ondřej Štyler (CZE)		1			0	1
1	Adam Taylor (AUS)		1			0	1
1	Jason Taylor (AUS)		1			0	1
1	Te Rigele (CHN)		1			0	1
1	Giuseppe Tresca (ITA)		1			0	1
1	Nicolò Turchetti (ITA)		1			0	1
1	Alexander Vasilenko (RUS)		1			0	1
1	Szymon Walków (POL)		1			0	1
1	Seita Watanabe (JPN)		1			0	1
1	Zeng Shihong (CHN)		1			0	1
1	Evan Zhu (USA)		1			0	1
1	Aaron Addison (AUS)				1	0	1
1	Franco Agamenone (ARG)				1	0	1
1	Kareem Al Allaf (SYR)				1	0	1
1	Jaimee Floyd Angele (FRA)				1	0	1
1	Vasile Antonescu (ROU)				1	0	1
1	Bogdan Ionuț Apostol (ROU)				1	0	1
1	Alen Avidzba (RUS)				1	0	1
1	Sagadat Ayap (KAZ)				1	0	1
1	Raphael Baltensperger (SUI)				1	0	1
1	Adrian Barbu (ROU)				1	0	1
1	Justin Barki (INA)				1	0	1
1	Nicolás Barrientos (COL)				1	0	1
1	Damien Bayard (FRA)				1	0	1
1	Colin van Beem (NED)				1	0	1
1	Riccardo Bellotti (ITA)				1	0	1
1	Jaime Bendeck (HON)				1	0	1
1	Samuel Beren (USA)				1	0	1
1	Bart van der Berg (NED)				1	0	1
1	Federico Bertuccioli (ITA)				1	0	1
1	Santiago Besada (ARG)				1	0	1
1	Nicolás Bianchi (ARG)				1	0	1
1	Jonathan Binding (GBR)				1	0	1
1	Alex Blumenberg (BRA)				1	0	1
1	Adrian Bodmer (SUI)				1	0	1
1	Carlos Boluda-Purkiss (ESP)				1	0	1
1	Maikel Borg (NED)				1	0	1
1	Toby Boyer (USA)				1	0	1
1	Trent Bryde (USA)				1	0	1
1	Skyler Butts (HKG)				1	0	1
1	Nicholas Bybel (USA)				1	0	1
1	Juan Pablo Cañas García (ESP)				1	0	1
1	Ljubomir Čelebić (MNE)				1	0	1
1	Christian Didier Chin (MAS)				1	0	1
1	Francisco Comesaña (ARG)				1	0	1
1	Gregorio Cordonnier (ARG)				1	0	1
1	Erik Crepaldi (ITA)				1	0	1
1	Baptiste Crepatte (FRA)				1	0	1
1	Cezar Crețu (ROU)				1	0	1
1	Amaury Delmas (FRA)				1	0	1
1	Michał Dembek (POL)				1	0	1
1	Matías Franco Descotte (ARG)				1	0	1
1	Niels Desein (BEL)				1	0	1
1	S D Prajwal Dev (IND)				1	0	1
1	Francisco Dias (POR)				1	0	1
1	Nini Gabriel Dica (ROU)				1	0	1
1	Oleg Dolgosheyev (UKR)				1	0	1
1	Filip Duda (CZE)				1	0	1
1	Jacob Dunbar (USA)				1	0	1
1	Louis Dussin (FRA)				1	0	1
1	Moez Echargui (TUN)				1	0	1
1	Péter Fajta (HUN)				1	0	1
1	Anas Fattar (MAR)				1	0	1
1	Arthur Fery (GBR)				1	0	1
1	Antoine Fouché (FRA)				1	0	1
1	Karl Friberg (SWE)				1	0	1
1	Mattia Frinzi (ITA)				1	0	1
1	Linus Frost (SWE)				1	0	1
1	Mátyás Füle (HUN)				1	0	1
1	Vasile-Alexandru Ghilea (ROU)				1	0	1
1	Luca Giacomini (ITA)				1	0	1
1	Daniil Glinka (EST)				1	0	1
1	Juan Pablo Grassi Mazzuchi (ARG)				1	0	1
1	Jonathan Gray (GBR)				1	0	1
1	Cameron Green (AUS)				1	0	1
1	Jacob Grills (AUS)				1	0	1
1	Valentin Günther (GER)				1	0	1
1	Petr Hájek (CZE)				1	0	1
1	Benjamin Hassan (GER)				1	0	1
1	Guy den Heijer (NED)				1	0	1
1	Simon Anthony Ivanov (BUL)				1	0	1
1	David Jordà Sanchis (ESP)				1	0	1
1	Facundo Juárez (ARG)				1	0	1
1	Niki Kaliyanda Poonacha (IND)				1	0	1
1	Markos Kalovelonis (GRE)				1	0	1
1	Dmytro Kamynin (UKR)				1	0	1
1	Dominik Kellovský (CZE)				1	0	1
1	Aziz Kijametović (BIH)				1	0	1
1	Koray Kırcı (TUR)				1	0	1
1	Kirill Kivattsev (RUS)				1	0	1
1	Alexis Klégou (BEN)				1	0	1
1	Denis Klok (RUS)				1	0	1
1	Tom Kočevar-Dešman (SLO)				1	0	1
1	Daniel Kossek (POL)				1	0	1
1	Lukas Krainer (AUT)				1	0	1
1	Karlo Kranić (CRO)				1	0	1
1	Sven Lah (SLO)				1	0	1
1	Alexander Lebedev (USA)				1	0	1
1	Lee Jea-moon (KOR)				1	0	1
1	Kai Lemstra (GER)				1	0	1
1	Lim Yong-kyu (KOR)				1	0	1
1	Pablo Llamas Ruiz (ESP)				1	0	1
1	Petru-Alexandru Luncanu (ROU)				1	0	1
1	William Ma (AUS)				1	0	1
1	Gergely Madarász (HUN)				1	0	1
1	Jody Maginley (ATG)				1	0	1
1	Nemanja Malešević (BIH)				1	0	1
1	Călin Manda (ROU)				1	0	1
1	Luca Margaroli (SUI)				1	0	1
1	Lilian Marmousez (FRA)				1	0	1
1	Toby Martin (GBR)				1	0	1
1	Martin van der Meerschen (BEL)				1	0	1
1	Alejandro Mendoza (BOL)				1	0	1
1	Vasko Mladenov (BUL)				1	0	1
1	Nicolas Moreno de Alboran (USA)				1	0	1
1	Ismael Changawa Ruwa Mzai (KEN)				1	0	1
1	Naoki Nakagawa (JPN)				1	0	1
1	Dominik Nazaruk (POL)				1	0	1
1	Ng Hao-yuan (SGP)				1	0	1
1	Takuto Niki (JPN)				1	0	1
1	Dennis Novikov (USA)				1	0	1
1	Victor Nuñez (CHI)				1	0	1
1	Neil Oberleitner (AUT)				1	0	1
1	Christian Oliveira (BRA)				1	0	1
1	Alexander Ovcharov (RUS)				1	0	1
1	Ștefan Paloși (ROU)				1	0	1
1	Luis Patiño (MEX)				1	0	1
1	José Pereira (BRA)				1	0	1
1	Miguel Alejandro Pereira (CHI)				1	0	1
1	Andrea Picchione (ITA)				1	0	1
1	Sidané Pontjodikromo (NED)				1	0	1
1	Matheus Pucinelli de Almeida (BRA)				1	0	1
1	Maciej Rajski (POL)				1	0	1
1	Kenneth Raisma (EST)				1	0	1
1	Rishi Reddy (IND)				1	0	1
1	Eduardo Ribeiro (BRA)				1	0	1
1	John Harrison Richmond (USA)				1	0	1
1	Ruan Roelofse (RSA)				1	0	1
1	Matthew Romios (AUS)				1	0	1
1	Robert Rumler (CZE)				1	0	1
1	Niklas Schell (GER)				1	0	1
1	Karue Sell (BRA)				1	0	1
1	Thomas Setodji (FRA)				1	0	1
1	Barnaby Smith (GBR)				1	0	1
1	Breno Souza Plentz (BRA)				1	0	1
1	Matic Špec (SLO)				1	0	1
1	Eliot Spizzirri (USA)				1	0	1
1	Jakob Sude (GER)				1	0	1
1	David Agung Susanto (INA)				1	0	1
1	Ko Suzuki (JPN)				1	0	1
1	Zachary Svajda (USA)				1	0	1
1	Dalibor Svrčina (CZE)				1	0	1
1	Yusuke Takahashi (JPN)				1	0	1
1	Sam Taylor (SWE)				1	0	1
1	Fermín Tenti (ARG)				1	0	1
1	Louis Tessa (FRA)				1	0	1
1	Aristotelis Thanos (GRE)				1	0	1
1	Eleftherios Theodorou (GRE)				1	0	1
1	Thiago Agustín Tirante (ARG)				1	0	1
1	George Tsivadze (GEO)				1	0	1
1	Andrey Uvarov (RUS)				1	0	1
1	Roy Sarut de Valk (NED)				1	0	1
1	Joseph Van Meter (USA)				1	0	1
1	Andrea Vavassori (ITA)				1	0	1
1	Francesco Vilardo (ITA)				1	0	1
1	Pedro Vives Marcos (ESP)				1	0	1
1	Matěj Vocel (CZE)				1	0	1
1	Émilien Voisin (FRA)				1	0	1
1	Kai Wehnelt (GER)				1	0	1
1	Alexander Weis (ITA)				1	0	1
1	Wong Hong-kit (HKG)				1	0	1
1	Fernando Yamacita (BRA)				1	0	1

=== Titles won by nation ===
2019 Titles won by nation

Total	Nation	M25		M15		Total	
Total	Nation	S	D	S	D	S	D
114	France (FRA)	28	20	32	34	60	54
90	Argentina (ARG)	7	6	41	36	48	42
85	United States (USA)	12	24	13	36	25	60
64	Russia (RUS)	4	10	24	26	28	36
53	Brazil (BRA)	7	10	11	25	18	35
49	Spain (ESP)	8	6	18	17	26	23
48	Great Britain (GBR)	4	11	13	20	17	31
44	Japan (JPN)	7	7	15	15	22	22
44	Czech Republic (CZE)	4	7	15	18	19	25
43	Italy (ITA)	6	9	12	16	18	25
42	Germany (GER)	5	4	14	19	19	23
41	Netherlands (NED)	10	7	5	19	15	26
33	Australia (AUS)	7	10	8	8	15	18
33	Ukraine (UKR)		6	9	18	9	24
30	Colombia (COL)	2	12	6	10	8	22
26	Belgium (BEL)	5	2	7	12	12	14
26	Peru (PER)	5	4	4	13	9	17
25	Romania (ROU)	1	3	10	11	11	14
24	Sweden (SWE)	3	2	6	13	9	15
24	Tunisia (TUN)	1	5	6	12	7	17
20	Kazakhstan (KAZ)	2	5	7	6	9	11
19	Switzerland (SUI)		1	7	11	7	12
19	Poland (POL)	1	3	4	11	5	14
15	China (CHN)	7	6	1	1	8	7
15	South Korea (KOR)		2	6	7	6	9
14	Croatia (CRO)	1	1	6	6	7	7
12	Dominican Republic (DOM)	4	1	2	5	6	6
12	Portugal (POR)	1	1	4	6	5	7
12	Hungary (HUN)		1	5	6	5	7
11	Austria (AUT)		2	3	6	3	8
11	Ireland (IRL)		2	1	8	1	10
10	Bulgaria (BUL)			5	5	5	5
9	Zimbabwe (ZIM)		1	3	5	3	6
9	Chinese Taipei (TPE)		2	2	5	2	7
8	Egypt (EGY)			8		8	0
8	Serbia (SRB)			7	1	7	1
8	Bolivia (BOL)		4		4	0	8
7	Uzbekistan (UZB)	2	2	2	1	4	3
7	Chile (CHI)	2	1	1	3	3	4
7	Slovenia (SLO)			1	6	1	6
6	Israel (ISR)	1	1	4		5	1
6	Ecuador (ECU)		1	3	2	3	3
6	Greece (GRE)		1	2	3	2	4
6	India (IND)	1			5	1	5
6	Canada (CAN)		1	1	4	1	5
5	Slovakia (SVK)			5		5	0
5	Turkey (TUR)			4	1	4	1
5	Bosnia and Herzegovina (BIH)	2		1	2	3	2
5	Morocco (MAR)	1		2	2	3	2
5	Mexico (MEX)			3	2	3	2
5	Latvia (LAT)	1	1	1	2	2	3
5	Estonia (EST)			2	3	2	3
5	Thailand (THA)		4		1	0	5
5	Belarus (BLR)		3		2	0	5
4	Cyprus (CYP)	2	2			2	2
4	Finland (FIN)	1		1	2	2	2
4	Lithuania (LTU)	1			3	1	3
4	Moldova (MDA)		2	1	1	1	3
4	Venezuela (VEN)			1	3	1	3
3	New Zealand (NZL)		1	1	1	1	2
3	Burundi (BDI)		1		2	0	3
2	Réunion (REU)			2		2	0
2	Bahamas (BAH)			1	1	1	1
2	Monaco (MON)			1	1	1	1
2	Guatemala (GUA)				2	0	2
2	Hong Kong (HKG)				2	0	2
2	Indonesia (INA)				2	0	2
1	Northern Mariana Islands (NMI)			1		1	0
1	Norway (NOR)			1		1	0
1	Antigua and Barbuda (ATG)				1	0	1
1	Benin (BEN)				1	0	1
1	Georgia (GEO)				1	0	1
1	Honduras (HON)				1	0	1
1	Kenya (KEN)				1	0	1
1	Montenegro (MNE)				1	0	1
1	Malaysia (MAS)				1	0	1
1	Singapore (SGP)				1	0	1
1	South Africa (RSA)				1	0	1
1	Syria (SYR)				1	0	1

- Quentin Robert started representing France in April, he won two singles titles while representing Réunion.
- Tomás Lipovšek Puches started representing Slovenia in May, he won two doubles titles while representing Argentina.

== See also ==
- 2019 ATP Tour
- 2019 ATP Challenger Tour
- 2019 ITF Women's World Tennis Tour
