= Evan Hoyt =

Mexican-born British former tennis player (born 1995)

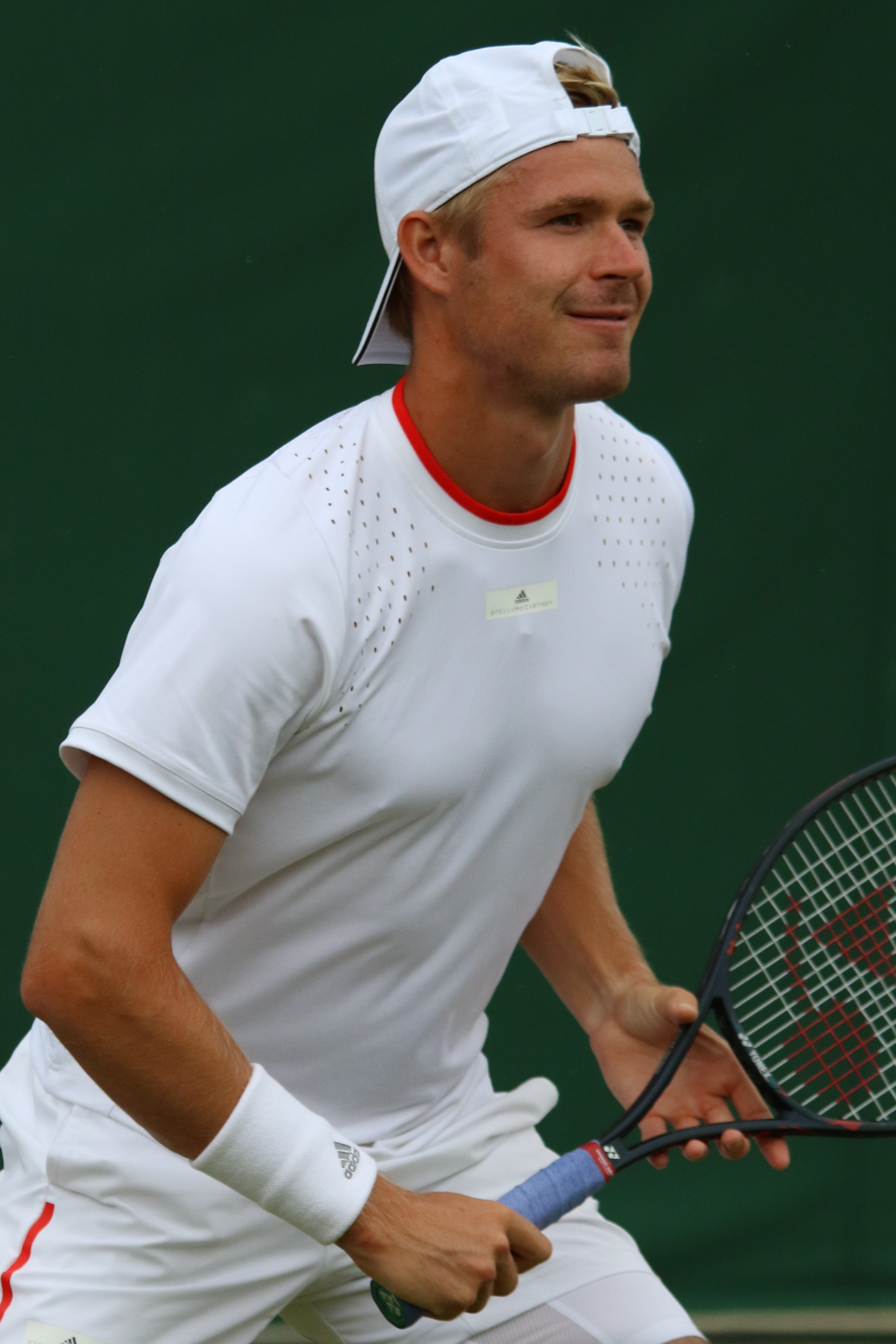
- Hoyt at the 2019 Wimbledon
- Country (sports): Great Britain
- Residence: Llanelli, United Kingdom
- Born: 16 January 1995 (age 31) Torreón, Mexico
- Height: 1.85 m (6 ft 1 in)
- Plays: Right-handed (two-handed backhand)
- Prize money: US$ 97,564

Singles
- Career record: 0–0
- Career titles: 0
- Highest ranking: No. 319 (16 September 2019)

Grand Slam singles results
- Wimbledon: Q1 (2019)

Doubles
- Career record: 0–1
- Career titles: 0
- Highest ranking: No. 217 (12 August 2019)

Grand Slam doubles results
- Wimbledon: 1R (2019)

Grand Slam mixed doubles results
- Wimbledon: QF (2019)
- Last updated on: 23 May 2022.

Evan Hoyt (born 16 January 1995) is a Mexican-born British former professional tennis player.

Hoyt had a career high ATP singles ranking of world No. 319, achieved on 16 September 2019. In doubles, he peaked at No. 217 on 12 August 2019.

He won one ATP Challenger doubles title at the 2018 Canberra Tennis International, playing alongside Wu Tung-lin and defeating Jeremy Beale and Thomas Fancutt in the final.

Partnering Eden Silva, Hoyt reached the mixed doubles quarterfinals at the 2019 Wimbledon Championships, where they lost to eventual champions Ivan Dodig and Latisha Chan.

In May 2022, he announced he was taking an indefinite break from professional tennis following a number of injuries.

Hoyt now coaches junior players in the Bay Area.

== ATP Challengers and ITF Futures finals ==
=== Singles: 10 (6–4) ===
Legend ATP Challengers (0–0) ITF Futures (6–4)	Finals by surface Hard (6–4) Clay (0–0) Grass (0–0) Carpet (0–0)

Result	W–L	Date	Tournament	Tier	Surface	Opponent	Score
Win	1–0	Oct 2015	El Kantaoui, Tunisia	Futures	Hard	(Netherlands) Kevin Griekspoor	6–3, 1–6, 6–2
Loss	1–1	Oct 2015	El Kantaoui, Tunisia	Futures	Hard	(France) Yannick Jankovits	4–6, 7–6^{(7–5)}, 3–6
Win	2–1	Nov 2015	El Kantaoui, Tunisia	Futures	Hard	(Spain) David Pérez Sanz	3–6, 6–3, 6–3
Loss	2–2	Sep 2018	Darwin, Australia	Futures	Hard	(Japan) Yuta Shimizu	6–7^{(6–8)}, 6–3, 4–6
Win	3–2	Oct 2018	Brisbane, Australia	Futures	Hard	(Northern Mariana Islands) Colin Sinclair	6–4, 7–6^{(7–5)}
Loss	3–3	Feb 2019	Monastir, Tunisia	Futures	Hard	(Brazil) Felipe Meligeni Alves	4–6, 3–6
Win	4–3	Mar 2019	Portimão, Portugal	Futures	Hard	(Portugal) Tiago Cação	6–3, 7–6^{(7–4)}
Win	5–3	Mar 2019	Quinta do Lago, Portugal	Futures	Hard	(France) Manuel Guinard	6–4, 6–3
Win	6–3	May 2019	Heraklion, Greece	Futures	Hard	(Austria) Jonas Trinker	4–6, 7–6^{(7–2)}, 7–5
Loss	6–4	Sep 2019	Bagnères-de-Bigorre, France	Futures	Hard	(Colombia) Eduardo Struvay	4–6, 4–6

=== Doubles: 31 (19–12) ===
Legend ATP Challengers (1–1) ITF Futures (18–11)	Finals by surface Hard (18–9) Clay (1–2) Grass (0–1) Carpet (0–0)

Result	W–L	Date	Tournament	Tier	Surface	Partner	Opponents	Score
Win	1–0	Oct 2013	Israel F14, Ramat HaSharon	Futures	Hard	(United Kingdom) Luke Bambridge	(United Kingdom) Liam Broady (United Kingdom) Joshua Ward-Hibbert	7–6^{(7–5)}, 7–6^{(7–4)}
Loss	1–1	Dec 2013	Qatar F3, Doha	Futures	Hard	(United Kingdom) Luke Bambridge	(Poland) Adam Chadaj (Germany) Dominik Schulz	6–1, 6–7^{(4–7)}, [4–10]
Win	2–1	Dec 2013	Qatar F4, Doha	Futures	Hard	(Tunisia) Skander Mansouri	(Georgia (country)) Nikoloz Basilashvili (Belarus) Yahor Yatsyk	6–4, 7–6^{(7–2)}
Loss	2–2	Dec 2014	Tunisia F10, Sousse	Futures	Hard	(United Kingdom) Andrew Bettles	(Italy) Alessandro Bega (Italy) Francesco Vilardo	6–7^{(2–7)}, 3–6
Loss	2–3	Jul 2015	Great Britain F6, Frinton	Futures	Grass	(Australia) Bradley Mousley	(United Kingdom) Daniel Smethurst (United Kingdom) Marcus Willis	4–6, 4–6
Win	3–3	Aug 2015	Belgium F9, Eupen	Futures	Clay	(United Kingdom) Billy Harris	(Belgium) Sander Gillé (Belgium) Joran Vliegen	7–6^{(7–5)}, 6–3
Loss	3–4	Aug 2015	Belgium F10, Koksijde	Futures	Clay	(United Kingdom) Toby Martin	(Belgium) Sander Gillé (Belgium) Joran Vliegen	2–6, 1–6
Loss	3–5	Aug 2015	Belgium F11, Jupille-sur-Meuse	Futures	Clay	(United Kingdom) Toby Martin	(Belgium) Sander Gillé (Belgium) Joran Vliegen	4–6, 1–6
Win	4–5	Oct 2015	Tunisia F25, El Kantaoui	Futures	Hard	(Tunisia) Anis Ghorbel	(France) Theo Fournerie (France) Jonathan Kanar	6–2, 6–3
Win	5–5	Nov 2015	Great Britain F10, Tipton	Futures	Hard (i)	(United Kingdom) Billy Harris	(United Kingdom) Lloyd Glasspool (United Kingdom) Joshua Ward-Hibbert	4–6, 6–3, [11–9]
Loss	5–6	Mar 2016	France F7, Villers-lès-Nancy	Futures	Hard (i)	(Canada) Martin Beran	(Germany) Andreas Mies (Germany) Oscar Otte	6–4, 4–6, [7–10]
Win	6–6	Apr 2018	Egypt F14, Sharm El Sheikh	Futures	Hard	(United States) Dusty H. Boyer	(Germany) Christian Hirschmueller (Italy) Joy Vigani	6–3, 6–4
Win	7–6	Jun 2018	Spain F13, Sta. Margarida Montbui	Futures	Hard	(Finland) Patrik Niklas-Salminen	(Venezuela) Jordi Muñoz Abreu (Spain) David Pérez Sanz	6–3, 6–7^{(7–9)}, [10–5]
Loss	7–7	Jun 2018	Spain F16, Palma del Río	Futures	Hard	(Ukraine) Marat Deviatiarov	(France) Mick Lescure (Colombia) Eduardo Struvay	5–7, 4–6
Win	8–7	Jul 2018	Spain F17, Bakio	Futures	Hard	(Ukraine) Marat Deviatiarov	(Belarus) Sergey Betov (Russia) Ivan Gakhov	6–7^{(4–7)}, 7–5 [10–5]
Loss	8–8	Aug 2018	Spain F22, Pozoblanco	Futures	Hard	(Serbia) Darko Jandric	(Spain) Andrés Artuñedo (France) Mick Lescure	7–6^{(7–3)}, 4–6, [6–10]
Win	9–8	Sep 2018	Australia F5, Cairns	Futures	Hard	(United States) Dusty H. Boyer	(Australia) Jacob Grills (Australia) Calum Puttergill	6–2, 7–5
Win	10–8	Nov 2018	Canberra, Australia	Challenger	Hard	(Chinese Taipei) Wu Tung-lin	(Australia) Jeremy Beale (Australia) Thomas Fancutt	7–6^{(7–5)}, 5–7, [10–8]
Win	11–8	Dec 2018	Tunisia F43, Monastir	Futures	Hard	(United Kingdom) Luke Johnson	(Italy) Marco Bortolotti (Canada) Steven Diez	6–4, 6–2
Loss	11–9	Jan 2019	M25 Tucson	Futures	Hard	(United Kingdom) Lloyd Glasspool	(Tunisia) Aziz Dougaz (France) Manuel Guinard	4–6, 7–5, [3–10]
Win	12–9	Feb 2019	M15 Monastir	Futures	Hard	(Tunisia) Skander Mansouri	(Ecuador) Diego Hidalgo (Brazil) Gilbert Soares Klier Júnior	6–7^{(1–7)}, 4–6
Win	13–9	Feb 2019	M25 Barnstaple	Futures	Hard (i)	(United Kingdom) Luke Johnson	(United Kingdom) Julian Cash (United Kingdom) Andrew Watson	3–6, 7–6^{(7–4)}, [10–6]
Win	14–9	Feb 2019	M25 Glasgow	Futures	Hard (i)	(United Kingdom) Luke Johnson	(United States) Tom Fawcett (United States) Alexander Ritschard	6–1, 7–6^{(8–6)}
Loss	14–10	Nov 2019	Champaign, United States	Challenger	Hard (i)	(United States) Martin Redlicki	(United States) Christopher Eubanks (United States) Kevin King	5–7, 3–6
Win	15–10	Jan 2020	M15 Manacor	Futures	Hard (i)	(United Kingdom) Jonathan Binding	(Republic of Ireland) Peter Bothwell (United Kingdom) Jonathan Gray	6–3, 6–4
Loss	15–11	Feb 2020	M25 Barnstaple	Futures	Hard (i)	(United Kingdom) Luke Johnson	(Poland) Jan Zieliński (Poland) Kacper Żuk	3–6, 6–7^{(5–7)}
Loss	15–12	Feb 2020	M25 Glasgow	Futures	Hard (i)	(Sweden) Simon Freund	(Poland) Szymon Walków (Poland) Jan Zieliński	1–6, 1–6
Win	16–12	Jul 2021	M15 Almada	Futures	Hard	(Australia) Thomas Fancutt	(Portugal) Fábio Coelho (Brazil) Natan Rodrigues	6–4, 6–2
Win	17–12	Jul 2021	M25 Idanha-a-Nova	Futures	Hard	(Australia) Thomas Fancutt	(Japan) Takuto Niki (Japan) Kaito Uesugi	6–3, 6–2
Win	18–12	Sep 2021	M25 Sintra	Futures	Hard	(France) Dan Added	(Brazil) Mateus Alves (Brazil) Leonardo Civita-Telles	6–7^{(8–10)}, 6–2, [10–6]
Win	19–12	Oct 2021	M25 Quinta Do Lago	Futures	Hard	(Tunisia) Skander Mansouri	(Spain) Alberto Barroso Campos (Spain) Roberto Ortega-Olmedo	4–6, 6–3, [10–5]
