= Anis Ghorbel =

Tunisian tennis player

Anis Ghorbel أنيس غربال
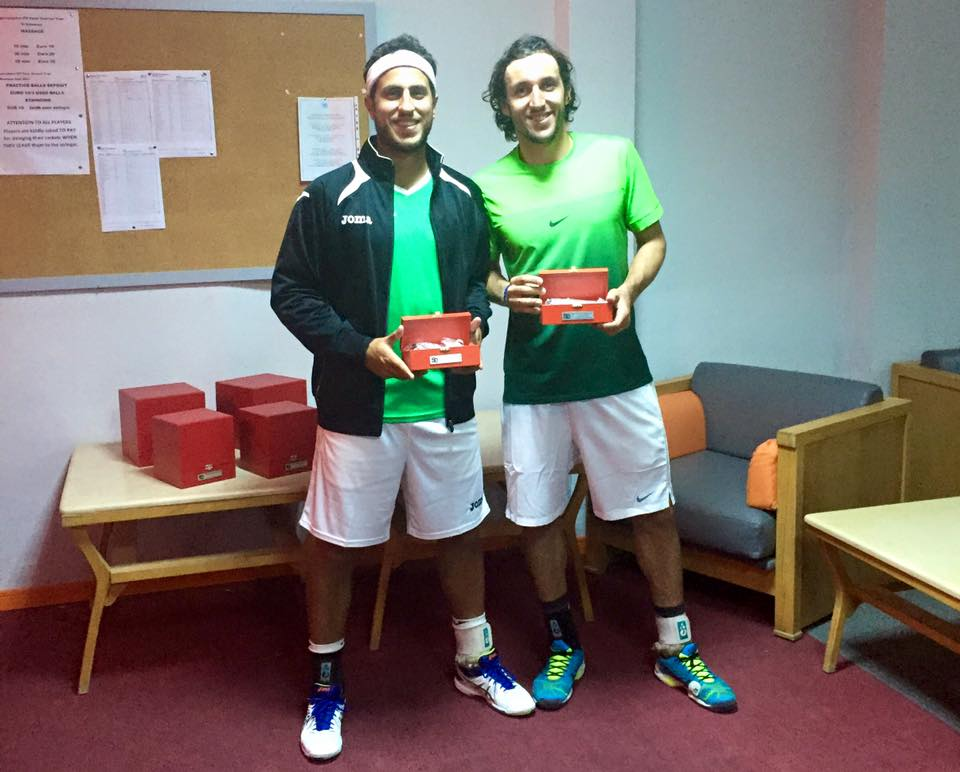
- Ghorbel and Vasko Mladenov in 2015
- Country (sports): Tunisia
- Born: 24 April 1989 (age 36) Sfax, Tunisia
- Plays: Right-handed (two-handed backhand)
- Prize money: $69,534

Singles
- Career record: 0–4 (at ATP Tour level, Grand Slam level, and in Davis Cup)
- Career titles: 0
- Highest ranking: No. 479 (19 September 2016)

Doubles
- Career record: 1–2 (at ATP Tour level, Grand Slam level, and in Davis Cup)
- Career titles: 0
- Highest ranking: No. 264 (23 July 2018)

Team competitions
- Davis Cup: 5–7
Medal record
Representing Tunisia
Men's Tennis
Mediterranean Games
Silver medal – second place	2018 Tarragona	Doubles

Anis Ghorbel (Arabic: أنيس غربال Anis Gharbal; born 24 April 1989) is a Tunisian tennis player.

Ghorbel has a career high ATP singles ranking of No. 479 achieved on 19 September 2016 and a career high ATP doubles ranking of No. 264 achieved on 23 July 2018. Ghorbel has won 1 ITF singles title and 26 ITF doubles titles.

Ghorbel has represented Tunisia at Davis Cup, where he has a win–loss record of 5–7.

== Future and Challenger finals ==
=== Singles: 6 (1–5) ===
Legend (singles) ATP Challenger Tour (0–0) ITF Futures Tour (1–5)	Titles by surface Hard (1–4) Clay (0–1) Grass (0–0) Carpet (0–0)

Result	W–L	Date	Tournament	Tier	Surface	Opponent	Score
Loss	0–1	Aug 2015	Tunisia F17, Tunis	Futures	Clay	(France) Tak Khunn Wang	3–6, 1–6
Loss	0–2	Nov 2015	Tunisia F30, El Kantaoui	Futures	Hard	(Spain) Bernabé Zapata Miralles	4–6, 4–6
Loss	0–3	Dec 2015	Tunisia F35, El Kantaoui	Futures	Hard	(Serbia) Nikola Milojević	3–6, 5–7
Loss	0–4	Dec 2015	Tunisia F36, El Kantaoui	Futures	Hard	(Serbia) Nikola Milojević	2–6, 6–4, 3–6
Loss	0–5	Sep 2016	Egypt F22, Sharm El Sheikh	Futures	Hard	(Egypt) Karim-Mohamed Maamoun	3–6, 1–6
Win	1–5	Sep 2016	Egypt F23, Sharm El Sheikh	Futures	Hard	(Russia) Roman Safiullin	5–7, 6–2, 7–6^{(7–4)}

=== Doubles 60 (31–29) ===
Legend (doubles) ATP Challenger Tour (0–0) ITF Futures Tour (31–29)	Titles by surface Hard (22–17) Clay (9–12) Grass (0–0) Carpet (0–0)

Result	W–L	Date	Tournament	Tier	Surface	Partner	Opponents	Score
Loss	0–1	Jun 2010	Tunisia F1, Tunis	Futures	Clay	(Tunisia) Wessim Derbel	(France) Laurent Rochette (Russia) Mikhail Vasiliev	0–6, 5–7
Loss	0–2	Mar 2015	Tunisia F9, El Kantaoui	Futures	Hard	(Tunisia) Majed Kilani	(Germany) Peter Heller (Belgium) Yannik Reuter	5–7, 1–6
Win	1–2	Apr 2015	Tunisia F13, El Kantaoui	Futures	Hard	(Bulgaria) Vasko Mladenov	(France) Remy Chala (Russia) Daniil Medvedev	4–6, 6–1, [11–9]
Loss	1–3	Apr 2015	Tunisia F15, El Kantaoui	Futures	Hard	(France) Victor Ouvrard	(Republic of Ireland) Sam Barry (France) Antoine Escoffier	3–6, 2–6
Win	2–3	Sep 2015	Tunisia F21, El Kantaoui	Futures	Hard	(Bulgaria) Vasko Mladenov	(Tunisia) Aziz Dougaz (United States) Jordan Dyke	6–2, 6–7^{(6–8)}, [10–6]
Win	3–3	Sep 2015	Tunisia F22, El Kantaoui	Futures	Hard	(Bulgaria) Vasko Mladenov	(France) Romain Bauvy (Luxembourg) Ugo Nastasi	2–6, 7–5, [12–10]
Loss	3–4	Sep 2015	Tunisia F24, El Kantaoui	Futures	Hard	(Tunisia) Majed Kilani	(France) Antoine Hoang (France) Louis Tessa	4–6, 1–6
Win	4–4	Oct 2015	Tunisia F25, El Kantaoui	Futures	Hard	(United Kingdom) Evan Hoyt	(France) Théo Fournerie (France) Jonathan Kanar	6–2, 6–3
Loss	4–5	Oct 2015	Tunisia F27, El Kantaoui	Futures	Hard	(Tunisia) Aziz Dougaz	(France) Benjamin Bonzi (France) Fabien Reboul	2–6, 2–6
Loss	4–6	Oct 2015	Tunisia F29, El Kantaoui	Futures	Hard	(Italy) Francesco Vilardo	(France) Benjamin Bonzi (Spain) Roberto Ortega Olmedo	0–6, 3–6
Loss	4–7	Nov 2015	Tunisia F33, El Kantaoui	Futures	Hard	(Bulgaria) Vasko Mladenov	(Venezuela) Jordi Muñoz Abreu (Spain) David Pérez Sanz	3–6, 1–6
Win	5–7	Dec 2015	Tunisia F34, El Kantaoui	Futures	Hard	(Bulgaria) Vasko Mladenov	(Spain) David Pérez Sanz (Spain) David Vega Hernández	6–7^{(2–7)}, 6–4, [10–8]
Loss	5–8	Dec 2015	Tunisia F35, El Kantaoui	Futures	Hard	(Bulgaria) Vasko Mladenov	(Republic of Ireland) Peter Bothwell (United Kingdom) Lloyd Glasspool	1–6, 4–6
Loss	5–9	Apr 2016	Qatar F2, Doha	Futures	Hard	(France) Tak Khunn Wang	(Switzerland) Antoine Bellier (France) Benjamin Bonzi	6–7^{(5–7)}, 3–6
Loss	5–10	Apr 2016	Qatar F3, Doha	Futures	Hard	(France) Tak Khunn Wang	(Switzerland) Antoine Bellier (France) Benjamin Bonzi	2–6, 6–1, [9–11]
Win	6–10	May 2016	Tunisia F17, Hammamet	Futures	Clay	(Spain) Oriol Roca Batalla	(Uruguay) Marcel Felder (Uruguay) Nicolás Xiviller	6–1, 6–2
Win	7–10	May 2016	Tunisia F18, Hammamet	Futures	Clay	(France) Benjamin Bonzi	(Spain) Sergio Martos Gornés (Spain) Oriol Roca Batalla	6–3, 7–6^{(8–6)}
Loss	7–11	Sep 2016	Egypt F22, Sharm El Sheikh	Futures	Hard	(Brazil) Pedro Bernardi	(Venezuela) Jordi Muñoz Abreu (Spain) David Pérez Sanz	6–7^{(4–7)}, 5–7
Win	8–11	Feb 2017	Tunisia F6, Hammamet	Futures	Clay	(Colombia) Cristian Rodríguez	(Portugal) Felipe Cunha e Silva (Brazil) Wilson Leite	6–1, 6–2
Loss	8–12	May 2017	Tunisia F17, Hammamet	Futures	Clay	(Colombia) Cristian Rodríguez	(Uruguay) Santiago Maresca (Spain) David Pérez Sanz	6–7^{(4–7)}, 7–5, [6–10]
Loss	8–13	May 2017	Tunisia F18, Hammamet	Futures	Clay	(Colombia) Cristian Rodríguez	(France) Yannick Jankovits (France) Jonathan Kanar	3–6, 4–6
Loss	8–14	May 2017	Tunisia F20, Hammamet	Futures	Clay	(Portugal) André Gaspar Murta	(Bolivia) Boris Arias (Ecuador) Diego Hidalgo	5–7, 3–6
Win	9–14	Jul 2017	Egypt F22, Cairo	Futures	Clay	(Benin) Alexis Klégou	(Portugal) Bernardo Saraiva (Argentina) Eduardo Agustín Torre	6–0, 6–4
Loss	9–15	Aug 2017	Turkey F31, Istanbul	Futures	Clay	(Slovakia) Filip Horanský	(Netherlands) Sidney de Boer (Netherlands) Tallon Griekspoor	4–6, 6–7^{(3–7)}
Loss	9–16	Sep 2017	Tunisia F25, Hammamet	Futures	Clay	(Tunisia) Aziz Dougaz	(France) Elliot Benchetrit (Germany) Rudolf Molleker	5–7, 3–6
Win	10–16	Oct 2017	Egypt F28, Sharm El Sheikh	Futures	Hard	(Spain) David Pérez Sanz	(Egypt) Youssef Hossam (Egypt) Mazen Osama	6–3, 7–6^{(7–2)}
Win	11–16	Oct 2017	Egypt F30, Sharm El Sheikh	Futures	Hard	(Egypt) Youssef Hossam	(Poland) Adrian Andrzejczuk (Spain) José Francisco Vidal Azorín	6–4, 4–2 ret.
Loss	11–17	Nov 2017	Tunisia F35, Hammamet	Futures	Clay	(Tunisia) Moez Echargui	(Serbia) Nikola Čačić (Croatia) Nino Serdarušić	5–7, 3–6
Win	12–17	Dec 2017	Tunisia F37, Hammamet	Futures	Clay	(Spain) Oriol Roca Batalla	(Italy) Raúl Brancaccio (Spain) Sergio Martos Gornés	6–3, 6–4
Loss	12–18	Dec 2017	Tunisia F38, Hammamet	Futures	Clay	(France) Samuel Bensoussan	(Italy) Raúl Brancaccio (Spain) Andrés Fernández Cánovas	6–7^{(4–7)}, 2–6
Loss	12–19	Jan 2018	Egypt F2, Sharm El Sheikh	Futures	Hard	(Tunisia) Moez Echargui	(Netherlands) Thiemo de Bakker (Netherlands) Michiel de Krom	3–6, 4–6
Loss	12–20	May 2018	Tunisia F18, Djerba	Futures	Hard	(Bulgaria) Vasko Mladenov	(Ecuador) Diego Hidalgo (Netherlands) Sem Verbeek	2–6, 4–6
Win	13–20	May 2018	Tunisia F19, Djerba	Futures	Hard	(Bulgaria) Vasko Mladenov	(United States) Hady Habib (Spain) José Francisco Vidal Azorín	4–6, 7–6^{(9–7)}, [12–10]
Win	14–20	May 2018	Tunisia F20, Djerba	Futures	Hard	(Bulgaria) Vasko Mladenov	(Benin) Alexis Klégou (Italy) Francesco Vilardo	6–3, 4–6, [10–7]
Win	15–20	Jun 2018	Tunisia F21, Djerba	Futures	Hard	(Bulgaria) Vasko Mladenov	(United States) John Paul Fruttero (France) Albano Olivetti	6–3, 6–2
Win	16–20	Jun 2018	Tunisia F22, Hammamet	Futures	Clay	(Tunisia) Aziz Dougaz	(Argentina) Santiago Besada (Argentina) Juan Ignacio Galarza	7–5, 7–5
Loss	16–21	Jun 2018	Tunisia F23, Hammamet	Futures	Clay	(Tunisia) Aziz Dougaz	(Spain) Sergio Barranco (Spain) Oriol Roca Batalla	6–4, 1–6, [8–10]
Win	17–21	Sep 2018	Tunisia F32, Monastir	Futures	Hard	(Bulgaria) Vasko Mladenov	(Peru) Alexander Merino (Germany) Christoph Negritu	6–3, 6–3
Win	18–21	Jan 2019	M15 Monastir, Tunisia	World Tennis Tour	Hard	(United Kingdom) Julian Cash	(Germany) Valentin Günther (Austria) Philipp Schroll	7–5, 6–4
Win	19–21	Mar 2019	M15 Tabarka, Tunisia	World Tennis Tour	Clay	(Bulgaria) Vasko Mladenov	(Spain) Sergio Martos Gornés (Spain) Oriol Roca Batalla	6–4, 6–1
Loss	19–22	May 2019	M15 Tabarka, Tunisia	World Tennis Tour	Clay	(Tunisia) Aziz Dougaz	(France) Manuel Guinard (Argentina) Mariano Kestelboim	4–6, 1–6
Loss	19–23	Jun 2019	M15 Tabarka, Tunisia	World Tennis Tour	Clay	(Netherlands) Michiel de Krom	(United States) Toby Boyer (Tunisia) Majed Kilani	4–6, 1–1 ret.
Loss	19–24	Aug 2019	M15 Tabarka, Tunisia	World Tennis Tour	Clay	(Russia) Yan Bondarevskiy	(Argentina) Nicolás Alberto Arreche (Argentina) Franco Feitt	4–6, 4–6
Win	20–24	Aug 2019	M15 Tabarka, Tunisia	World Tennis Tour	Clay	(Tunisia) Majed Kilani	(Argentina) Franco Feitt (Argentina) Guido Iván Justo	6–4, 6–4
Loss	20–25	Oct 2019	M15 Sharm El Sheikh, Egypt	World Tennis Tour	Hard	(Czech Republic) Marek Gengel	(Venezuela) Jordi Muñoz Abreu (Spain) David Pérez Sanz	3–6, 6–3, [7–10]
Win	21–25	Oct 2019	M15 Sharm El Sheikh, Egypt	World Tennis Tour	Hard	(Czech Republic) Marek Gengel	(Morocco) Adam Moundir (Italy) Giorgio Ricca	7–6^{(7–4)}, 6–3
Loss	21–26	Dec 2019	M15 Monastir, Tunisia	World Tennis Tour	Hard	(Russia) Yan Bondarevskiy	(France) Florian Lakat (Tunisia) Skander Mansouri	6–7^{(6–8)}, 4–6
Win	22–26	Feb 2020	M15 Monastir, Tunisia	World Tennis Tour	Hard	(Tunisia) Moez Echargui	(Bosnia and Herzegovina) Aziz Kijametović (Morocco) Adam Moundir	7–5, 6–4
Win	23–26	Mar 2020	M15 Monastir, Tunisia	World Tennis Tour	Hard	(Tunisia) Moez Echargui	(France) Quentin Folliot (France) Hugo Pontico	6–0, 6–2
Win	24–26	Mar 2020	M15 Monastir, Tunisia	World Tennis Tour	Hard	(France) Louis Tessa	(Italy) Luca Giacomini (Russia) Kirill Kivattsev	6–1, 6–2
Win	25–26	Nov 2020	M15 Monastir, Tunisia	World Tennis Tour	Hard	(Tunisia) Aziz Ouakaa	(Estonia) Kenneth Raisma (Estonia) Kristjan Tamm	w/o
Loss	25–27	Feb 2021	M15 Monastir, Tunisia	World Tennis Tour	Hard	(Slovenia) Tom Kočevar-Dešman	(Tunisia) Moez Echargui (France) Jean Thirouin	5–7, 0–6
Win	26–27	Mar 2021	M15 Monastir, Tunisia	World Tennis Tour	Hard	(Italy) Luca Potenza	(Brazil) Mateus Alves (Brazil) Igor Marcondes	6–4, 6–1
Win	27–27	Apr 2021	M15 Monastir, Tunisia	World Tennis Tour	Hard	(Brazil) Oscar Jose Gutierrez	(Brazil) Gilbert Klier Junior (Brazil) Igor Marcondes	6–3, 1–6, [10–8]
Win	28–27	Aug 2021	M15 Novi Sad, Serbia	World Tennis Tour	Clay	(Tunisia) Aziz Ouakaa	(United Kingdom) Charles Broom (Croatia) Alen Roglic-Hadzalic	6–4, 7–5
Loss	28–28	Oct 2021	M15 Monastir, Tunisia	World Tennis Tour	Hard	(Switzerland) Mirko Martinez	(India) Niki Kaliyanda Poonacha (Kazakhstan) Grigoriy Lomakin	1–6, 5–7
Loss	28–29	Oct 2021	M15 Monastir, Tunisia	World Tennis Tour	Hard	(Switzerland) Mirko Martinez	(Argentina) Mateo Nicolás Martínez (New Zealand) Ajeet Rai	6–7^{(1–7)}, 6–4, [11–9]
Win	29–29	Aug 2022	M15 Monastir, Tunisia	World Tennis Tour	Hard	(Tunisia) Aziz Ouakaa	(China) Tang Sheng (China) Zheng Baoluo	6–1, 6–1
Win	30–29	Sep 2022	M15 Monastir, Tunisia	World Tennis Tour	Hard	(Tunisia) Aziz Ouakaa	(China) Li Majun (China) Tang Sheng	6–4, 4–6, [10–6]
Win	31–29	Oct 2022	M15 Monastir, Tunisia	World Tennis Tour	Hard	(Lebanon) Hady Habib	(Netherlands) Brian Bozemoj (Netherlands) Jarno Jans	7–6^{(7–5)}, 1–6, [10–8]
