= David Pérez Sanz =

Spanish tennis player (born 1994)

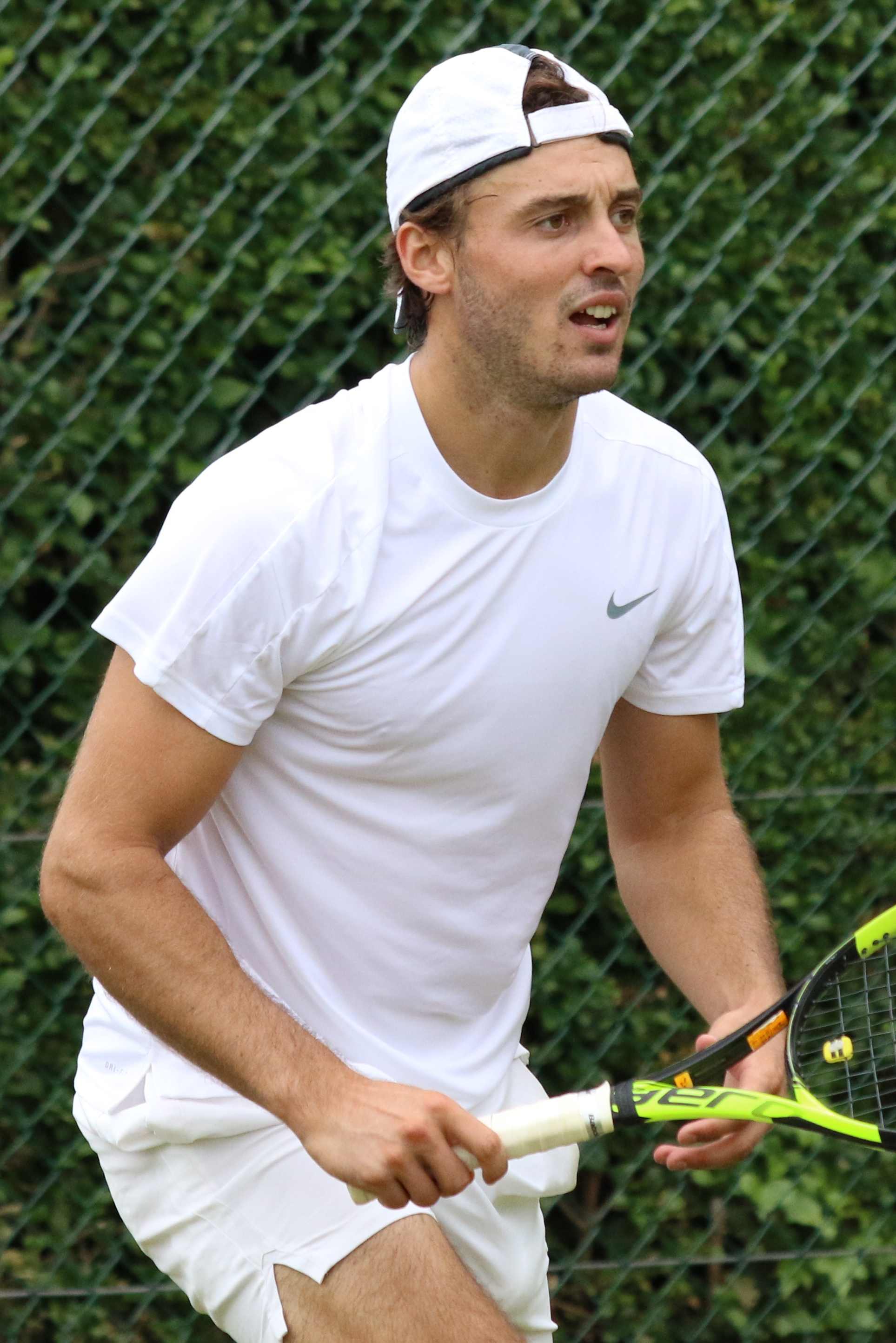
- Country (sports): Spain
- Born: 15 May 1994 (age 32)
- Plays: Right-handed (two-handed backhand)
- Prize money: $199,428

Singles
- Career record: 0–0
- Career titles: 0
- Highest ranking: No. 216 (6 June 2016)

Grand Slam singles results
- Wimbledon: Q1 (2016)
- US Open: Q1 (2016)

Doubles
- Career record: 0–0
- Career titles: 0
- Highest ranking: No. 158 (19 September 2016)

David Pérez Sanz (Spanish pronunciation: [daˈβið ˈpeɾeθ ˈsanθ]; born 15 May 1994) is a Spanish tennis player.

Pérez Sanz has a career high ATP singles ranking of No. 216 achieved on 6 June 2016 and a career high ATP doubles ranking of No. 158 achieved on 19 September 2016. Pérez Sanz has won 1 ATP Challenger doubles title, 12 ITF singles Futures titles and 36 ITF doubles Futures titles.

In July 2016, Pérez Sanz won the 2016 Tampere Open doubles title, partnering Max Schnur.

As of January 28, 2019, Pérez Sanz is number 1 in the ITF World Tennis Singles Ranking.

== ATP Challenger and ITF Futures finals ==
=== Singles: 39 (20–19) ===
Legend ATP Challenger (0–0) ITF Futures (20–19)	Finals by surface Hard (18–14) Clay (2–5) Grass (0–0) Carpet (0–0)

Result	W–L	Date	Tournament	Tier	Surface	Opponent	Score
Win	1–0	Aug 2012	Spain F23, Ourense	Futures	Hard	(Spain) Marc Fornell Mestres	6–4, 6–4
Loss	1–1	Sep 2013	Spain F28, Pozoblanco	Futures	Hard	(Spain) Andres Artunedo Martinavarro	7–6^{(7–4)}, 0–6, 1–6
Win	2–1	May 2014	Tunisia F2, Sousse	Futures	Hard	(Italy) Stefano Napolitano	6–7^{(2–7)}, 6–3, 6–4
Loss	2–2	Jun 2014	Tunisia F3, Sousse	Futures	Hard	(France) Rémi Boutillier	3–6, 1–6
Win	3–2	Jul 2014	Spain F16, Bakio	Futures	Hard	(Spain) Jose Anton Martin	6–2, 6–2
Loss	3–3	Nov 2014	Tunisia F7, Sousse	Futures	Hard	(Belgium) Julien Cagnina	6–1, 2–6, 4–6
Loss	3–4	Mar 2015	India F2, Bhimavaram	Futures	Hard	(India) Jeevan Nedunchezhiyan	6–7^{(7–9)}, 1–6
Loss	3–5	May 2015	Algeria F1, Oran	Futures	Clay	(Spain) Mario Vilella Martínez	6–7^{(4–7)}, 3–6
Win	4–5	May 2015	Algeria F2, Algiers	Futures	Clay	(France) Corentin Denolly	3–6, 6–1, 6–2
Loss	4–6	May 2015	Algeria F3, Annaba	Futures	Clay	(France) Sadio Doumbia	3–6, 2–6
Loss	4–7	Jun 2015	Egypt F22, Sharm El Sheikh	Futures	Hard	(Egypt) Mohamed Safwat	2–6, 3–6
Win	5–7	Jun 2015	Egypt F23, Sharm El Sheikh	Futures	Hard	(Egypt) Mohamed Safwat	7–5, 3–6, 6–1
Loss	5–8	Aug 2015	Tunisia F18, Tunis	Futures	Clay	(Italy) Omar Giacalone	1–6, 2–6
Loss	5–9	Aug 2015	Tunisia F20, El Kantaoui	Futures	Hard	(Bulgaria) Dimitar Kuzmanov	4–6, 3–6
Win	6–9	Sep 2015	Tunisia F21, El Kantaoui	Futures	Hard	(France) Thibault Venturino	6–2, 6–3
Win	7–9	Oct 2015	Tunisia F28, El Kantaoui	Futures	Hard	(France) Jonathan Kanar	6–4, 6–4
Win	8–9	Nov 2015	Tunisia F29, El Kantaoui	Futures	Hard	(Kazakhstan) Dmitry Popko	3–6, 7–6^{(7–4)}, 6–3
Loss	8–10	Nov 2015	Tunisia F33, El Kantaoui	Futures	Hard	(United Kingdom) Evan Hoyt	6–3, 3–6, 3–6
Win	9–10	Apr 2016	Turkey F13, Antalya	Futures	Hard	(Turkey) Cem Ilkel	6–2, 7–6^{(7–1)}
Win	10–10	May 2016	Nigeria F4, Abuja	Futures	Hard	(Egypt) Mohamed Safwat	7–6^{(7–3)}, 6–4
Win	11–10	May 2016	Bulgaria F1, Sozopol	Futures	Hard	(Bulgaria) Aleksandar Lazov	6–2, 6–3
Loss	11–11	May 2016	Bulgaria F2, Ruse	Futures	Clay	(Belgium) Germain Gigounon	6–7^{(4–7)}, 3–6
Loss	11–12	Jul 2017	Portugal F12, Idanha-a-Nova	Futures	Hard	(Monaco) Lucas Catarina	4–6, 4–6
Win	12–12	Aug 2017	Portugal F16, Sintra	Futures	Hard	(France) Jonathan Kanar	7–5, 7–5
Loss	12–13	Oct 2017	Egypt F27, Sharm El Sheikh	Futures	Hard	(Egypt) Youssef Hossam	3–6, 4–6
Loss	12–14	Apr 2018	Tunisia F13, Jerba	Futures	Hard	(France) David Guez	4–6, 0–6
Loss	12–15	May 2018	Uganda F3, Kampala	Futures	Clay	(Russia) Ivan Nedelko	0–6, 3–6
Win	13–15	Jun 2018	Sri Lanka F2, Colombo	Futures	Clay	(Russia) Alexander Zhurbin	7–6^{(7–5)}, 6–4
Loss	13–16	Jul 2018	Malaysia F1, Kuala Lumpur	Futures	Hard	(South Korea) Kim Cheong-Eui	3–6, 5–7
Loss	13–17	Aug 2018	Spain F22, Pozoblanco	Futures	Hard	(France) Mick Lescure	6–7^{(6–8)}, 2–6
Win	14–17	Oct 2018	Egypt F21, Sharm El Sheikh	Futures	Hard	(Italy) Alessandro Bega	6–3, 3–6, 7–5
Win	15–17	Oct 2018	Egypt F22, Sharm El Sheikh	Futures	Hard	(United Kingdom) Neil Pauffley	6–7^{(7–9)}, 6–4, 6–3
Win	16–17	Nov 2018	Egypt F26, Sharm El Sheikh	Futures	Hard	(Netherlands) Ryan Nijboer	6–3, 2–6, 7–6^{(7–0)}
Win	17–17	Nov 2018	Egypt F27, Sharm El Sheikh	Futures	Hard	(Switzerland) Adam Moundir	6–7^{(5–7)}, 6–3, 6–3
Win	18–17	Nov 2018	Egypt F28, Sharm El Sheikh	Futures	Hard	(Netherlands) Ryan Nijboer	6–1, 6–1
Win	19–17	Nov 2019	M15 Maputo, Mozambique	World Tennis Tour	Hard	(Zimbabwe) Takanyi Garanganga	7–5, 6–3
Loss	19–18	Nov 2019	M15 Maputo, Mozambique	World Tennis Tour	Hard	(Canada) Kelsey Stevenson	6–7^{(3–7)}, 2–6
Loss	19–19	Jan 2023	M15 Monastir, Tunisia	World Tennis Tour	Hard	(France) Lilian Marmousez	6–4, 1–6, 0–6
Win	20–19	Mar 2023	M15 Aktobe, Kazakhstan	World Tennis Tour	Hard (i)	(Russia) Evgeny Philippov	6–3, 0–6, 6–2

=== Doubles: 71 (52–19) ===
Legend ATP Challenger (3–0) ITF Futures (49–19)	Finals by surface Hard (32–10) Clay (20–8) Grass (0–0) Carpet (0–1)

Result	W–L	Date	Tournament	Tier	Surface	Partner	Opponents	Score
Loss	0–1	Aug 2011	Spain F30, Orense	Futures	Hard	(Spain) M-A López Jaén	(Spain) Jaime Pulgar-Garcia (Bolivia) Federico Zeballos	5–7, 7–5, [8–10]
Win	1–1	Jul 2012	Spain F20, Gandia	Futures	Clay	(Spain) J-S Arauzo-Martinez	(Russia) Aleksandr Lobkov (Russia) Alexander Rumyantsev	7–6^{(7–3)}, 7–5
Loss	1–2	Sep 2012	Spain F27, Oviedo	Futures	Clay	(Spain) J-S Arauzo-Martinez	(Spain) Gabriel Trujillo Soler (Spain) M-A López Jaén	2–6, 6–1, [9–11]
Loss	1–3	Jul 2013	Spain F21, Getxo	Futures	Clay	(Spain) Eduard Esteve Lobato	(Russia) Ivan Gakhov (Spain) M-A López Jaén	3–6, 6–3, [11–13]
Win	2–3	Aug 2013	Spain F26, Vigo	Futures	Clay	(Portugal) Frederico Ferreira Silva	(Germany) Jean-Marc Werner (Spain) J-S Arauzo-Martinez	6–2, 7–6^{(7–3)}
Win	3–3	Sep 2013	Spain F31, Madrid	Futures	Hard	(Spain) Jaime Pulgar-Garcia	(Spain) Oriol Roca Batalla (Spain) Roberto Ortega Olmedo	5–7, 6–4, [10–8]
Win	4–3	Oct 2013	Spain F33, Sabadell	Futures	Clay	(India) Ramkumar Ramanathan	(Spain) Oriol Roca Batalla (Spain) Eduard Esteve Lobato	6–7^{(4–7)}, 6–3, [10–8]
Loss	4–4	Oct 2013	Spain F36, El Prat de Llobregat	Futures	Clay	(India) Ramkumar Ramanathan	(Italy) Antonio Campo (Italy) Omar Giacalone	6–3, 4–6, [6–10]
Loss	4–5	Nov 2013	Spain F39, Tenerife	Futures	Carpet	(Spain) David Vega Hernández	(Spain) Roberto Ortega Olmedo (Spain) Carlos Boluda-Purkiss	1–6, 3–6
Win	5–5	Feb 2014	Portugal F1, Vale do Lobo	Futures	Hard	(Spain) Ivan Arenas-Gualda	(Spain) Jaime Pulgar-Garcia (Spain) J-S Arauzo-Martinez	2–6, 7–6^{(7–3)}, [11–9]
Win	6–5	Jun 2014	Spain F14, Melilla	Futures	Hard	(Bolivia) Federico Zeballos	(Spain) David Vega Hernández (Spain) Ivan Arenas-Gualda	6–4, 6–7^{(5–7)}, [10–5]
Win	7–5	Jul 2014	Spain F17, Getxo	Futures	Clay	(India) Ramkumar Ramanathan	(Spain) J A Salazar Martin (Portugal) João Domingues	5–7, 6–3, [10–4]
Loss	7–6	Aug 2014	Belgium F10, Eupen	Futures	Clay	(Germany) Leon Schutt	(Netherlands) Bobbie De Goeijen (Netherlands) Scott Griekspoor	6–1, 4–6, [4–10]
Loss	7–7	Aug 2014	Belgium F11, Koksijde	Futures	Clay	(Australia) Jake Eames	(Belgium) Sander Gillé (Belgium) Joran Vliegen	6–3, 3–6, [10–12]
Win	8–7	Sep 2014	Spain F28, Sevilla	Futures	Clay	(Spain) Ricardo Ojeda Lara	(Poland) Arkadiusz Kocyla (Burundi) Hassan Ndayishimiye	6–1, 7–6^{(7–4)}
Loss	8–8	Oct 2014	Spain F32, Madrid	Futures	Hard	(Spain) Ricardo Villacorta-Alonso	(Spain) Gerard Granollers (Spain) Oriol Roca Batalla	6–7^{(4–7)}, 0–6
Loss	8–9	Nov 2014	Tunisia F7, Sousse	Futures	Hard	(Spain) Jaime Pulgar-Garcia	(Netherlands) Alban Meuffels (Netherlands) Romano Frantzen	6–3, 3–6, [6–10]
Win	9–9	Nov 2014	Tunisia F9, Sousse	Futures	Hard	(Venezuela) Jordi Muñoz Abreu	(South Africa) Damon Gooch (United Kingdom) James Marsalek	6–4, 6–2
Loss	9–10	Nov 2014	India F1, Chandigarh	Futures	Hard	(Spain) Enrique Lopez Perez	(India) Jeevan Nedunchezhiyan (India) N Vijay Sundar Prashanth	3–6, 4–6
Loss	9–11	Apr 2015	Tunisia F12, El Kantaoui	Futures	Hard	(Spain) Jaume Pla Malfeito	(Belgium) Julien Cagnina (Belgium) Jeroen Vanneste	6–3, 4–6, [7–10]
Win	10–11	May 2015	Algeria F1, Oran	Futures	Clay	(Turkey) Halit Berke Mangaloglu	(Argentina) Matias Castro (Argentina) Matias Franco Descotte	5–7, 6–2, [10–4]
Win	11–11	May 2015	Algeria F2, Algiers	Futures	Clay	(Turkey) Halit Berke Mangaloglu	(Spain) Matias Castro (Brazil) Matias Franco Descotte	6–4, 6–4
Win	12–11	Jun 2015	Egypt F22, Sharm El Sheikh	Futures	Hard	(Spain) Jaime Pulgar-Garcia	(Egypt) Karim Hossam (Syria) Issam Haitham Taweel	3–6, 6–2, [10–6]
Win	13–11	Jun 2015	Egypt F23, Sharm El Sheikh	Futures	Hard	(Egypt) Karim-Mohamed Maamoun	(Egypt) Mohamed Safwat (Syria) Issam Haitham Taweel	7–5, 6–3
Loss	13–12	Aug 2015	Tunisia F18, Tunis	Futures	Clay	(Venezuela) Jordi Muñoz Abreu	(France) Ronan Joncour (France) Mandresy Rakotomalala	3–6, 4–6
Loss	13–13	Aug 2015	Tunisia F19, El Kantaoui	Futures	Hard	(Bulgaria) Dimitar Kuzmanov	(Germany) Milen Ianakiev (Peru) Alexander Merino	5–7, 6–1, [5–10]
Win	14–13	Aug 2015	Tunisia F20, El Kantaoui	Futures	Hard	(Bulgaria) Dimitar Kuzmanov	(United States) Jordan Dyke (Argentina) Eduardo TORRE	6–3, 6–7^{(3–7)}, [10–7]
Win	15–13	Oct 2015	Tunisia F28, El Kantaoui	Futures	Hard	(Belgium) Michael Geerts	(France) Jonathan Kanar (France) François-Arthur Vibert	6–4, 6–4
Win	16–13	Nov 2015	Tunisia F31, El Kantaoui	Futures	Hard	(Venezuela) Jordi Muñoz Abreu	(Switzerland) Loic Perret (France) Hugo Voljacques	6–4, 6–3
Win	17–13	Nov 2015	Tunisia F32, El Kantaoui	Futures	Hard	(Venezuela) Jordi Muñoz Abreu	(Spain) S R Navarrete (Spain) David Vega Hernández	6–4, 7–5
Win	18–13	Nov 2015	Tunisia F33, El Kantaoui	Futures	Hard	(Venezuela) Jordi Muñoz Abreu	(Tunisia) Anis Ghorbel (Bulgaria) Vasko Mladenov	6–3, 6–1
Loss	18–14	Dec 2015	Tunisia F34, El Kantaoui	Futures	Hard	(Spain) David Vega Hernández	(Tunisia) Anis Ghorbel (Bulgaria) Vasko Mladenov	7–6^{(7–2)}, 4–6, [8–10]
Win	19–14	Feb 2016	Tunisia F5, Hammamet	Futures	Clay	(Venezuela) Jordi Muñoz Abreu	(Russia) Kirill Dmitriev (Russia) Alexey Vatutin	7–5, 6–3
Win	20–14	Feb 2016	Tunisia F7, Hammamet	Futures	Clay	(Venezuela) Jordi Muñoz Abreu	(Portugal) Vasco Mensurado (Russia) Alexander Zhurbin	6–1, 6–3
Win	21–14	Mar 2016	Turkey F12, Antalya	Futures	Hard	(Venezuela) Jordi Muñoz Abreu	(Netherlands) Jesse Huta Galung (Bulgaria) Aleksandar Lazov	6–0, 6–3
Loss	21–15	Apr 2016	Turkey F14, Antalya	Futures	Hard	(Belgium) Michael Geerts	(Lithuania) Lukas Mugevicius (Russia) Aleksandr Vasilenko	2–6, 2–6
Win	22–15	Apr 2016	Nigeria F1, Abuja	Futures	Hard	(United States) Nicolas Meister	(Egypt) Karim-Mohamed Maamoun (Egypt) Mohamed Safwat	6–3, 6–4
Win	23–15	May 2016	Nigeria F3, Abuja	Futures	Hard	(United States) Nicolas Meister	(Netherlands) David Pel (Netherlands) Antal van der Duim	3–6, 7–6^{(7–2)}, [11–9]
Loss	23–16	May 2016	Bulgaria F1, Sozopol	Futures	Hard	(Switzerland) Luca Margaroli	(Russia) Alexander Igoshin (Russia) Yan Sabanin	6–2, 3–6, [6–10]
Win	24–16	Jul 2016	Tampere, Finland	Challenger	Clay	(United States) Max Schnur	(Australia) Steven de Waard (Germany) Andreas Mies	6–4, 6–4
Win	25–16	Sep 2016	Egypt F22, Sharm El Sheikh	Futures	Hard	(Venezuela) Jordi Muñoz Abreu	(Brazil) Pedro Bernardi (Tunisia) Anis Ghorbel	7–6^{(7–4)}, 7–5
Win	26–16	Oct 2016	Tunisia F26, Hammamet	Futures	Clay	(Lithuania) Laurynas Grigelis	(France) Benjamin Bonzi (France) Mathias Bourgue	walkover
Win	27–16	Nov 2016	Kuwait F2, Mishref	Futures	Hard	(Venezuela) Jordi Muñoz Abreu	(Germany) Daniel Altmaier (Sweden) Fred Simonsson	6–4, 6–4
Win	28–16	May 2017	Tunisia F17, Hammamet	Futures	Clay	(Greece) Santiago Maresca	(Tunisia) Anis Ghorbel (Colombia) Cristian Rodríguez	7–6^{(7–4)}, 5–7, [10–6]
Win	29–16	May 2017	Turkey F20, Antalya	Futures	Clay	(Spain) Sergio Martos Gornés	(Lithuania) Julius Tverijonas (Bolivia) Hugo Dellien	7–5, 6–4
Win	30–16	Jun 2017	Turkey F21, Antalya	Futures	Clay	(Venezuela) Jordi Muñoz Abreu	(Brazil) Ricardo Hocevar (Chile) Juan Carlos Sáez	6–4, 6–3
Win	31–16	Jul 2017	Portugal F10, Torres Vedras	Futures	Hard	(Venezuela) Jordi Muñoz Abreu	(France) Albano Olivetti (France) Hugo Voljacques	6–4, 7–6^{(7–5)}
Win	32–16	Jul 2017	Portugal F12, Idanha-a-Nova	Futures	Hard	(Spain) Pablo Vivero Gonzalez	(Portugal) Francisco Cabral (Portugal) Goncalo Falcao	6–7^{(7–9)}, 7–5, [10–7]
Win	33–16	Sep 2017	Portugal F18, Sintra	Futures	Hard	(Spain) Jaime Pulgar-Garcia	(Portugal) Nuno Deus (Portugal) Bernardo Saraiva	6–4, 6–2
Win	34–16	Sep 2017	Egypt F25, Cairo	Futures	Clay	(Argentina) Franco Feitt	(Italy) Francesco Bessire (France) Leny Mitjana	6–2, 6–2
Win	35–16	Oct 2017	Egypt F28, Sharm El Sheikh	Futures	Hard	(Tunisia) Anis Ghorbel	(Egypt) Youssef Hossam (Egypt) Mazen Osama	6–3, 7–6^{(7–2)}
Win	36–16	Oct 2017	Egypt F29, Sharm El Sheikh	Futures	Hard	(Republic of Ireland) Peter Bothwell	(Belarus) Aliaksandr Liaonenka (Ukraine) Nikita Mashtakov	6–0, 6–3
Win	37–16	Nov 2017	Egypt F35, Sharm El Sheikh	Futures	Hard	(Ukraine) Vladyslav Manafov	(Turkey) Tuna Altuna (Turkey) Cem Ilkel	6–2, 6–3
Loss	37–17	May 2018	Uganda F3, Kampala	Futures	Clay	(Venezuela) Jordi Muñoz Abreu	(United States) Tyler Lu (Serbia) Goran Markovic	6–7^{(4–7)}, 4–6
Loss	37–18	Jun 2018	Spain F13, Santa Margarida de Montbui	Futures	Hard	(Venezuela) Jordi Muñoz Abreu	(United Kingdom) Evan Hoyt (Finland) Patrik Niklas-Salminen	2–6, 7–6^{(9–7)}, [5–10]
Win	38–18	Jun 2018	Sri Lanka F1, Colombo	Futures	Clay	(Ukraine) Vladyslav Orlov	(Brazil) Diego Matos (Brazil) Thales Turini	4–6, 6–1, [10–6]
Win	39–18	Jun 2018	Sri Lanka F2, Colombo	Futures	Clay	(Ukraine) Vladyslav Orlov	(Brazil) Diego Matos (Brazil) Thales Turini	6–4, 5–7, [10–7]
Win	40–18	Jul 2018	Malaysia F2, Kuala Lumpur	Futures	Hard	(United States) John Paul Fruttero	(South Korea) Kim Cheong-Eui (South Korea) Noh Sang-Woo	6–4, 6–4
Win	41–18	Aug 2018	Segovia, Spain	Challenger	Hard	(Spain) Andres Artunedo Martinavarro	(Portugal) Joao Monteiro (Argentina) Matias Franco Descotte	6–7^{(3–7)}, 6–3, [10–6]
Win	42–18	Aug 2018	Meerbusch, Germany	Challenger	Clay	(Netherlands) Mark Vervoort	(Poland) Grzegorz Panfil (Ukraine) Volodymyr Uzhylovskyi	3–6, 6–4, [10–7]
Win	43–18	Oct 2018	Egypt F21, Sharm El Sheikh	Futures	Hard	(Italy) Marco Brugnerotto	(Switzerland) Adam Moundir (Poland) Kacper Żuk	3–6, 6–2, [10–7]
Win	44–18	Oct 2018	Egypt F22, Sharm El Sheikh	Futures	Hard	(Italy) Marco Brugnerotto	(Switzerland) Adam Moundir (Germany) Kai Wehnelt	7–5, 3–6, [10–6]
Win	45–18	Oct 2018	Egypt F23, Sharm El Sheikh	Futures	Hard	(Germany) Kai Wehnelt	(Switzerland) Adam Moundir (Portugal) Francisco Dias	6–3, 6–3
Win	46–18	Nov 2018	Egypt F26, Sharm El Sheikh	Futures	Hard	(Venezuela) Jordi Muñoz Abreu	(Switzerland) Johan Nikles (Poland) Adrian Andrzejczuk	6–2, 6–0
Win	47–18	Nov 2018	Egypt F27, Sharm El Sheikh	Futures	Hard	(Venezuela) Jordi Muñoz Abreu	(Brunei) Ali Dawani (Switzerland) Adam Moundir	6–2, 6–4
Win	48–18	Nov 2018	Egypt F28, Sharm El Sheikh	Futures	Hard	(Venezuela) Jordi Muñoz Abreu	(Egypt) Adham Gaber (Poland) Kacper Żuk	6–3, 6–2
Win	49–18	Oct 2019	M15 Sharm El Sheikh, Egypt	World Tennis Tour	Hard	(Venezuela) Jordi Muñoz Abreu	(Czech Republic) Marek Gengel (Tunisia) Anis Ghorbel	6–3, 3–6, [10–7]
Win	50–18	Dec 2019	M15 Telde, Spain	World Tennis Tour	Clay	(Venezuela) Jordi Muñoz Abreu	(Spain) JJ Miranda Cisneros (Spain) David Vega Hernández	6–4, 6–3
Win	51–18	Dec 2019	M15 Cairo, Egypt	World Tennis Tour	Clay	(Lithuania) Laurynas Grigelis	(Argentina) Ignacio Monzon (Argentina) Fermin Tenti	6–1, 3–6, [10–7]
Win	52–18	Jan 2020	M15 Cancún, Mexico	World Tennis Tour	Hard	(Argentina) Nicolas Alberto Arreche	(Canada) Juan Carlos Aguilar (United States) Tanner K Smith	7–6^{(9–7)}, 6–1
Loss	52–19	Mar 2020	M25 Murcia, Spain	World Tennis Tour	Clay	(Spain) Sergio Martos Gornés	(Spain) Íñigo Cervantes Huegun (Spain) Oriol Roca Batalla	6–7^{(3–7)}, 3–6
