= Vasko Mladenov =

Bulgarian tennis player

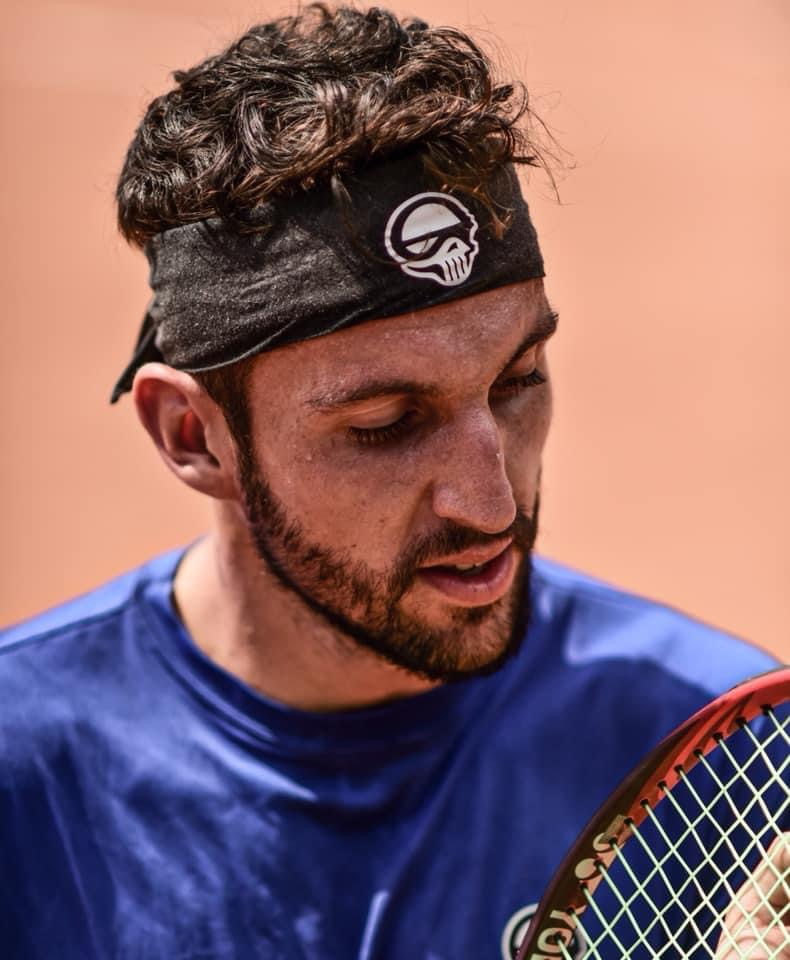
- Country (sports): Bulgaria
- Residence: Sofia, Bulgaria
- Born: 30 July 1989 (age 37) Sofia, Bulgaria
- Height: 1.88 m (6 ft 2 in)
- Turned pro: 2005
- Plays: Right-handed (two-handed backhand)
- Prize money: US$47,373

Singles
- Career record: 1–0 (at ATP Tour level, Grand Slam level, and in Davis Cup)
- Career titles: 0; 0 Challengers, 0 Futures
- Highest ranking: No. 637 (20 June 2016)

Doubles
- Career record: 1–3 (at ATP Tour level, Grand Slam level, and in Davis Cup)
- Career titles: 0; 0 Challengers, 17 Futures
- Highest ranking: No. 359 (20 June 2016)
- Last updated on: 20 September 2021.

Vasko Mladenov (Bulgarian: Васко Младенов, born 30 July 1989) is a former pro tennis player and an active padel player from Bulgaria.

He is a three time Bulgarian National champion, once in doubles (2014) and two times in singles (2016, 2017). Mladenov also holds the record for the most professional international doubles titles in Bulgarian tennis history (18 ITF titles)

Mladenov also played for two years at the number 1 position at St. John's University (New York) in ITA Division 1. During his stay in New York he won the North Regional Championship (2011).

He participated in the Davis Cup in doubles in March 2016 against Turkey, bringing Bulgaria a historic win 7:6, 6:7, 6:7, 7:6, 6:4 alongside fellow Bulgarian Alexander Lazov.

Mladenov also took part in the Davis Cup tie against Tunisia in August 2016, where he won his singles match against Moez Echargui in a thrilling 6:7, 7:5, 7:6 match. He also took part in the Davis Cup group 3 tie against Iceland, Macedonia, Albania and finally Bulgaria faced Monaco in the deciding playoff to promote to group 2, unfortunately Bulgaria lost the tie. He made his debut at an ATP tournament in 2018, playing in his native Bulgaria the ATP Sofia Open.

At 2013 US Open, he was working with Novak Djokovic as his sparring partner.

== Early and personal life ==
Vasko was born in Sofia, Bulgaria, as the only child of Vasil, who is from Bulgaria and, Elena, who is from Russia. When he was five he began to play with his grandfather, Lev Shulga, who is a well known coach from the former U.S.S.R. Vasko speaks fluent Bulgarian, Russian and English. He is known for his aggressive and all-court style of play. Mladenov has a right-handed forehand and double-handed backhand. His favourite surface is hard. His hobbies are listening to music, playing the piano, playing snooker, billiards and playing football.

== The Bachelorette Ukraine ==
In 2021, as a public figure, Mladenov took part in the second season of the Ukrainian version of “The Bachelorette” («Холостячка»), a famous romantic TV reality show, which ended up being the most watched TV show in Ukraine that year.

After the TV show, Vasko gained a large amount of fans in Ukraine.

== Junior career ==
He won three tournaments as a junior. The first one was in 2005, he defeated Plamen Avramov in Plovdiv in straight sets, final score was 6–0, 6–1. The second one also was in 2005, in Timișoara, he defeated Maksim Bakunin in three sets, 6–4, 4–6, 7–6^{(4)}. The third and final one was in 2006, in Kyiv, he won the tournament after beating Uladzimir Ignatik in three sets, 3–6, 6–3, 6–1. All these tournaments were played on clay court. In 2007, in France, he played the European Junior. Bulgaria was represented by Vasko, Valentin Dimov and Aleksandar Lazov, they were runners-up.

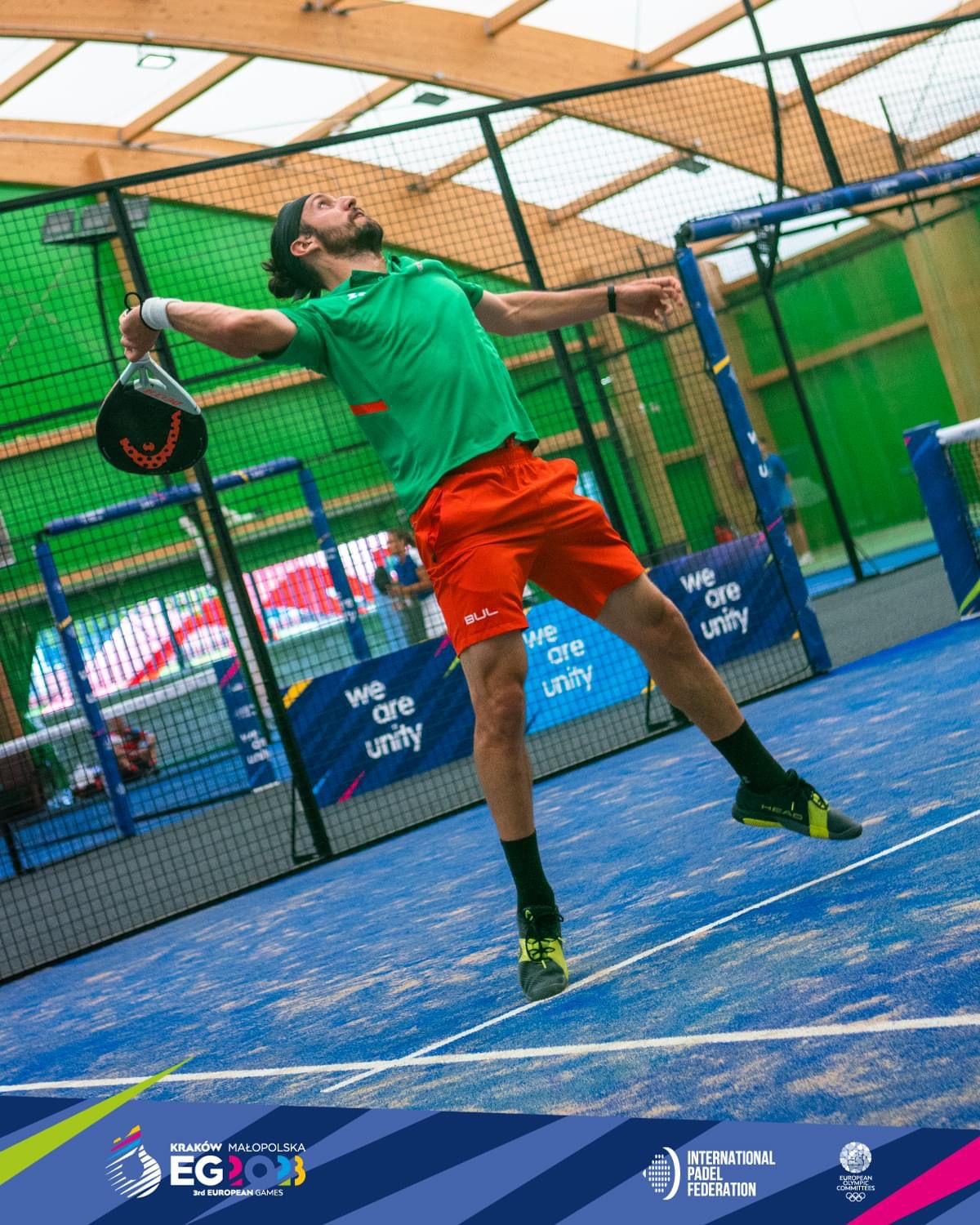
Vasko Mladenov playing a point during the European Games in Krakow 2023.

== Padel career ==
After finishing his professional tennis career in 2020, Vasko moved on to padel. Alongside his partner Kiril Dimitrov (BUL) he achieved a total of 5 international tournament titles between 2021 and 2023.

In 2022, Mladenov and Dimitrov took part in the Padel World Cup qualifications, there they managed to deliver the first ever padel victory (against Norway) in the history of Bulgarian padel.

Mladenov and Dimitrov are currently known as the best padel team in Bulgaria.

== Music career ==
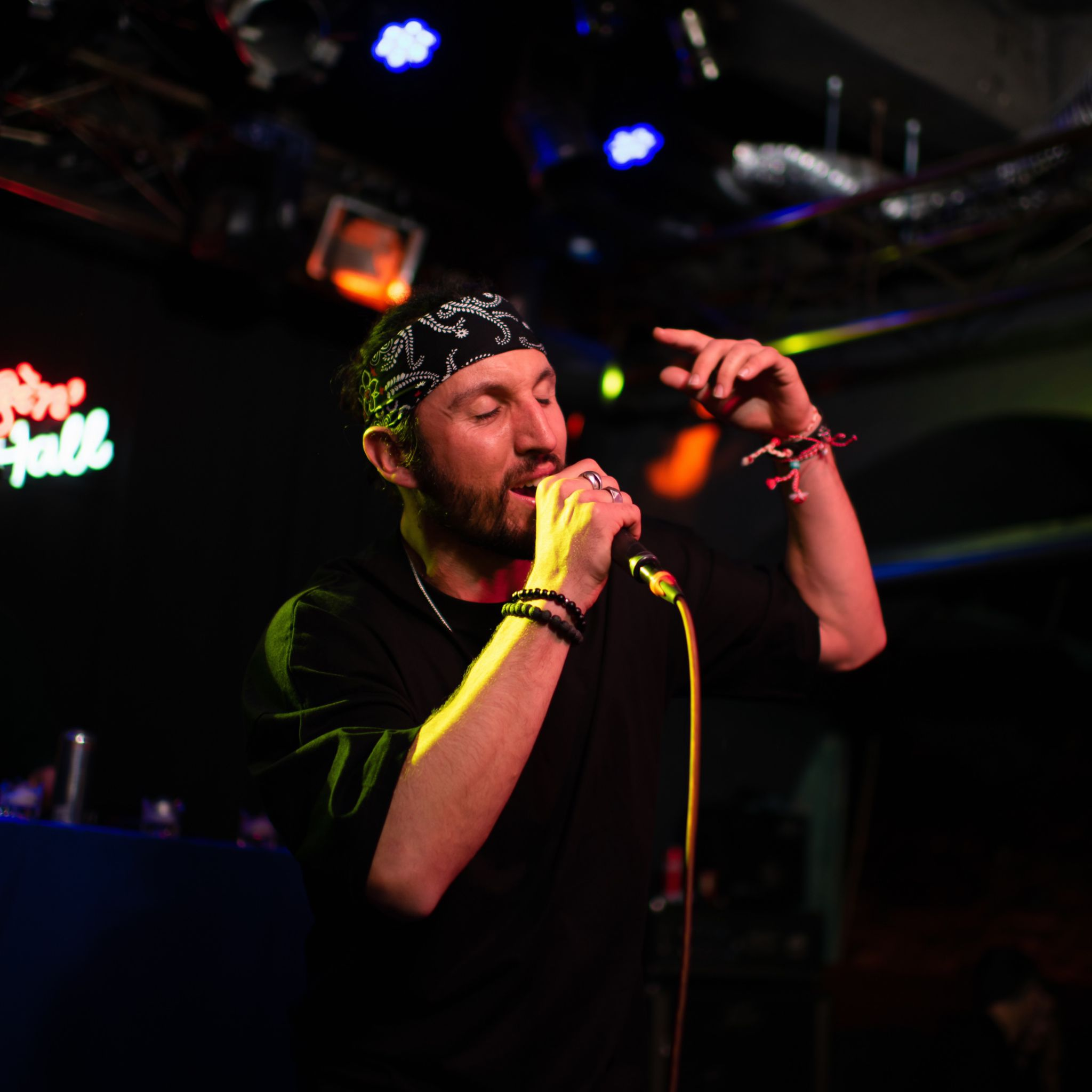

In 2009 Mladenov starred a career in music as a rap/hip-hop performer as “Vasko”. The majority of his songs are in Russian, however, Vasko has released 5 songs in Bulgarian over the years. So far he has released 4 albums: «Сердце Солдата» (2010), «Дороги» (2012), «VNY3» (2014) and «Отражения» (2022).

Vasko has also released multiple singles.

== Year-end rankings ==
Year	2005	2006	2007	2008	2009	2010	2011	2012	2013	2014	2015	2016	2017	2018	2019
Singles	1497	1541	969	950	1268	-	-	-	-	1372	689	918	1071	965	1201
Doubles	-	1476	796	727	584	-	-	-	-	695	427	687	759	483	872

== Challenger and Futures/World Tennis Tour finals ==
=== Singles: 2 (0–2) ===
Legend (singles) ATP Challenger Tour (0–0) ITF Futures/World Tennis Tour (0–2)	Titles by surface Hard (0–0) Clay (0–2) Grass (0–0) Carpet (0–0)

Result	W–L	Date	Tournament	Tier	Surface	Opponent	Score
Loss	0–1	Jul 2015	Turkey F28, Ankara	Futures	Clay	(Russia) Ivan Nedelko	5–7, 3–6
Loss	0–2	Oct 2015	Ukraine F6, Cherkasy	Futures	Clay	(Russia) Ivan Nedelko	5–7, 4–6

=== Doubles: 31 (17–14) ===
Legend (doubles) ATP Challenger Tour (0–0) ITF Futures/World Tennis Tour (17–14)	Titles by surface Hard (10–5) Clay (7–8) Grass (0–0) Carpet (0–1)

Result	W–L	Date	Tournament	Tier	Surface	Partner	Opponents	Score
Win	1–0	Jun 2007	Bulgaria F3, Pleven	Futures	Clay	(Germany) Pirmin Haenle	(Croatia) Roman Kelečić (Croatia) Nikola Martinović	2–6, 6–4, 6–4
Loss	1–1	Jun 2007	Bulgaria F4, Sofia	Futures	Clay	(Bulgaria) Ilia Kushev	(Serbia) David Savić (Serbia) Miljan Zekić	4–6, 3–6
Win	2–1	Sep 2007	Bulgaria F6, Burgas	Futures	Clay	(Belarus) Sergey Betov	(Croatia) Roman Kelečić (Croatia) Nikola Martinović	3–0 ret.
Win	3–1	Sep 2008	Bulgaria F8, Stara Zagora	Futures	Clay	(Bulgaria) Boris Nicola Bakalov	(Serbia) Ivan Bjelica (Serbia) Miljan Zekić	6–3, 6–4
Win	4–1	Dec 2008	Brazil F33, São Paulo	Futures	Hard (i)	(United States) Nikita Kryvonos	(Brazil) Diogo Cruz (Brazil) Rodrigo-Antonio Grilli	4–6, 6–1, [10–5]
Loss	4–2	Dec 2008	Brazil F34, São Paulo	Futures	Hard (i)	(Argentina) Nicolás Pastor	(Germany) Mario Eckardt (Germany) Patrick Taubert	2–6, 2–6
Win	5–2	Dec 2008	Brazil F35, São Paulo	Futures	Hard	(Germany) Lars Pörschke	(Brazil) Diego Matos (Brazil) Eládio Ribeiro Neto	6–1, 6–2
Win	6–2	May 2014	Ukraine F4, Rivne	Futures	Clay	(United States) Nikita Kryvonos	(Ukraine) Yurii Dzhavakian (Ukraine) Volodymyr Uzhylovskyi	6–4, 6–4
Loss	6–3	May 2014	Ukraine F5, Rivne	Futures	Clay	(United States) Nikita Kryvonos	(Ukraine) Yurii Dzhavakian (Ukraine) Volodymyr Uzhylovskyi	2–6, 4–6
Loss	6–4	Jul 2014	Bulgaria F5, Plovdiv	Futures	Clay	(Bulgaria) Dinko Halachev	(Monaco) Romain Arneodo (Switzerland) Luca Margaroli	6–7^{(4–7)}, 4–6
Win	7–4	Apr 2015	Tunisia F13, El Kantaoui	Futures	Hard	(Tunisia) Anis Ghorbel	(France) Remy Chala (Russia) Daniil Medvedev	4–6, 6–1, [11–9]
Loss	7–5	May 2015	Ukraine F1, Cherkasy	Futures	Clay	(Ukraine) Vadym Ursu	(Ukraine) Sergiy Sergiienko (Ukraine) Artem Smirnov	6–3, 4–6, [7–10]
Loss	7–6	Jul 2015	Turkey F29, Ankara	Futures	Clay	(Russia) Alexander Igoshin	(Italy) Daniele Capecchi (Italy) Federico Maccari	6–7^{(6–8)}, 6–3, [7–10]
Win	8–6	Sep 2015	Tunisia F21, El Kantaoui	Futures	Hard	(Tunisia) Anis Ghorbel	(Tunisia) Aziz Dougaz (United States) Jordan Dyke	6–2, 6–7^{(6–8)}, [10–6]
Win	9–6	Sep 2015	Tunisia F22, El Kantaoui	Futures	Hard	(Tunisia) Anis Ghorbel	(France) Romain Bauvy (Luxembourg) Ugo Nastasi	2–6, 7–5, [12–10]
Loss	9–7	Nov 2015	Tunisia F33, El Kantaoui	Futures	Hard	(Tunisia) Anis Ghorbel	(Venezuela) Jordi Muñoz Abreu (Spain) David Pérez Sanz	3–6, 1–6
Win	10–7	Dec 2015	Tunisia F34, El Kantaoui	Futures	Hard	(Tunisia) Anis Ghorbel	(Spain) David Pérez Sanz (Spain) David Vega Hernández	6–7^{(2–7)}, 6–4, [10–8]
Loss	10–8	Dec 2015	Tunisia F35, El Kantaoui	Futures	Hard	(Tunisia) Anis Ghorbel	(Republic of Ireland) Peter Bothwell (United Kingdom) Lloyd Glasspool	1–6, 4–6
Win	11–8	May 2016	Ukraine F3, Cherkasy	Futures	Clay	(Ukraine) Volodymyr Uzhylovskyi	(Ukraine) Denys Mylokostov (Ukraine) Danylo Veremeychuk	6–4, 6–1
Win	12–8	Jun 2016	Bulgaria F3, Stara Zagora	Futures	Clay	(Russia) Yan Sabanin	(Spain) Carlos Calderón (Spain) Pedro Martínez	6–2, 7–6^{(7–2)}
Loss	12–9	Aug 2016	Belarus F1, Minsk	Futures	Hard	(Russia) Markos Kalovelonis	(Belarus) Yaraslav Shyla (Belarus) Dzmitry Zhyrmont	6–7^{(8–10)}, 3–6
Loss	12–10	Jul 2017	Turkey F25, Istanbul	Futures	Clay	(Serbia) Nikola Ćaćić	(Serbia) Miki Janković (Bulgaria) Dimitar Kuzmanov	4–6, 6–2, [9–11]
Loss	12–11	Jul 2017	Turkey F26, Istanbul	Futures	Clay	(Russia) Alexander Igoshin	(Turkey) Sarp Ağabigün (Ukraine) Marat Deviatiarov	2–6, 6–7^{(5–7)}
Loss	12–12	May 2018	Tunisia F18, Djerba	Futures	Hard	(Tunisia) Anis Ghorbel	(Ecuador) Diego Hidalgo (Netherlands) Sem Verbeek	2–6, 4–6
Win	13–12	May 2018	Tunisia F19, Djerba	Futures	Hard	(Tunisia) Anis Ghorbel	(Lebanon) Hady Habib (Spain) José Vidal Azorín	4–6, 7–6^{(9–7)}, [12–10]
Win	14–12	May 2018	Tunisia F20, Djerba	Futures	Hard	(Tunisia) Anis Ghorbel	(Benin) Alexis Klégou (Italy) Francesco Vilardo	6–3, 4–6, [10–7]
Win	15–12	Jun 2018	Tunisia F21, Djerba	Futures	Hard	(Tunisia) Anis Ghorbel	(United States) John Paul Fruttero (France) Albano Olivetti	6–3, 6–2
Win	16–12	Sep 2018	Tunisia F32, Monastir	Futures	Hard	(Tunisia) Anis Ghorbel	(Peru) Alexander Merino (Germany) Christoph Negritu	6–3, 6–3
Loss	16–13	Nov 2018	Estonia F2, Tartu	Futures	Carpet (i)	(Switzerland) Luca Castelnuovo	(Estonia) Vladimir Ivanov (Russia) Maxim Ratniuk	4–6, 6–1, [4–10]
Win	17–13	Mar 2019	M15 Tabarka, Tunisia	World Tennis Tour	Clay	(Tunisia) Anis Ghorbel	(Spain) Sergio Martos Gornés (Spain) Oriol Roca Batalla	6–4, 6–1
Loss	17–14	Aug 2019	M15 Irpin, Ukraine	World Tennis Tour	Clay	(Kazakhstan) Sagadat Ayap	(Ukraine) Vladyslav Orlov (Georgia (country)) George Tsivadze	6–1, 3–6, [5–10]

== Davis Cup ==
Vasko Mladenov debuted for the Bulgaria Davis Cup team in 2016 against Turkey in Ankara. Since then he has a 1–0 singles record and a 4–2 doubles record (5–2 overall). He participated in Davis Cup in doubles in March 2016 against Turkey, bringing Bulgaria a historic win 7:6, 6:7, 6:7, 7:6, 6:4 alongside fellow Bulgarian Alexander Lazov. Mladenov also took part in the Davis Cup tie against Tunisia in August 2016, where he won his singles match against Moez Echargui in a thrilling 6:7, 7:5, 7:6 match. He also took part in the Davis Cup group 3 tie against Iceland, Macedonia, Albania and finally Bulgaria faced Monaco in the deciding playoff to promote to group 2, unfortunately Bulgaria lost the tie.

=== Singles (1–0) ===
Edition	Round	Date	Surface	Opponent	W/L	Result
2016 Europe/Africa Zone Group II	RPO	17 July 2016	Hard	(Tunisia) Moez Echargui	W	6–7^{(5–7)}, 7–5, 7–6^{(7–5)}

=== Doubles (4–2) ===
Edition	Round	Date	Partner	Surface	Opponents	W/L	Result
2016 Europe/Africa Zone Group II	R1	5 March 2016	(Bulgaria) Alexander Lazov	Hard (I)	(Turkey) Cem İlkel (Turkey) Tuna Altuna	W	7–6^{(8–6)}, 6–7^{(5–7)}, 6–7^{(4–7)}, 7–6^{(7–5)}, 6–4
2016 Europe/Africa Zone Group II	RPO	16 July 2016	(Bulgaria) Alexandar Lazarov	Hard	(Tunisia) Malek Jaziri (Tunisia) Skander Mansouri	L	4–6, 4–6, 3–6
2018 Europe Zone Group III	RR	4 April 2018	(Bulgaria) Dimitar Kuzmanov	Clay	(Albania) Elbi Mjeshtri (Albania) Genajd Shypheja	W	6–0, 6–0
2018 Europe Zone Group III	RR	5 April 2018	(Bulgaria) Dimitar Kuzmanov	Clay	(Iceland) Birkir Gunnarsson (Iceland) Egill Sigurdsson	W	6–2, 6–1
2018 Europe Zone Group III	RR	6 April 2018	(Bulgaria) Adrian Andreev	Clay	(North Macedonia) Stefan Micov (North Macedonia) Gorazd Srbljak	W	6–4, 6–3
2018 Europe Zone Group III	PRO	7 April 2018	(Bulgaria) Dimitar Kuzmanov	Clay	(Monaco) Romain Arneodo (Monaco) Benjamin Balleret	L	4–6, 3–6

- RPO = Relegation Play–off
- PPO = Promotion Play–off
- RR = Round Robin
