= Peter Bothwell =

Tennis player from Northern Ireland

- Country (sports): Ireland
- Residence: Hillsborough, Northern Ireland
- Born: 28 September 1995 (age 30) Belfast, Northern Ireland
- Height: 5 ft 9 in (1.75 m)
- Plays: Right-handed (one-handed backhand)
- Prize money: $44,972

Singles
- Career record: 2–2 (at ATP Tour level, Grand Slam level, and in Davis Cup)
- Career titles: 0; 0 Challenger, 1 Futures
- Highest ranking: No. 602 (5 August 2019)

Doubles
- Career record: 0–2 (at ATP Tour level, Grand Slam level, and in Davis Cup)
- Career titles: 0; 0 Challenger, 8 Futures
- Highest ranking: No. 447 (17 September 2018)

Team competitions
- Davis Cup: 7–5

Peter Bothwell (born 28 September 1995) is a former Northern Irish tennis player who represented Ireland.

Bothwell has a career high ATP singles ranking of World No. 602 achieved on 5 August 2019. Also, Bothwell has a career high ATP doubles ranking of World No. 447 achieved on 17 September 2018.

Bothwell has reached two singles finals in his career, with a record of 1 win an 1 loss, winning the title at the Spain F38 Futures tournament in November 2018. Additionally, he has reached 17 career doubles finals with a record of 8 wins and 9 losses. All of his combined 19 final appearances have been at the ITF Futures level.

Bothwell has represented Ireland at the Davis Cup, where he has a W/L record of 7–5.

== ATP Challenger and ITF Futures finals ==
=== Singles: 2 (1–1) ===
Legend ATP Challenger (0–0) ITF Futures (1–1)	Finals by surface Hard (0–1) Clay (0–0) Grass (0–0) Carpet (1–0)

Result	W–L	Date	Tournament	Tier	Surface	Opponent	Score
Loss	0–1	Nov 2016	Spain F38, Almería	Futures	Hard	(Spain) Ricardo Ojeda Lara	0–6, 2–6
Win	1–1	Aug 2018	Ireland F1, Dublin	Futures	Carpet	(United Kingdom) Ryan James Storrie	5–7, 6–3, 6–3

=== Doubles: 17 (8–9) ===
Legend ATP Challenger (0–0) ITF Futures (8–9)	Finals by surface Hard (8–6) Clay (0–1) Grass (0–0) Carpet (0–2)

Result	W–L	Date	Tournament	Tier	Surface	Partner	Opponents	Score
Loss	0–1	Jul 2014	Ireland F1, Dublin	Futures	Carpet	(Republic of Ireland) David O'Hare	(United Kingdom) Edward Corrie (Denmark) Frederik Nielsen	2–6, 5–7
Loss	0–2	Oct 2015	Greece F7, Heraklion	Futures	Hard	(United Kingdom) Toby Martin	(United Kingdom) Lloyd Glasspool (Denmark) Joshua Ward-Hibbert	3–6, 5–7
Win	1–2	Dec 2015	Tunisia F35, El Kantaoui	Futures	Hard	(United Kingdom) Lloyd Glasspool	(Tunisia) Anis Ghorbel (Bulgaria) Vasko Mladenov	6–1, 6–4
Win	2–2	Dec 2016	Spain F39, Almería	Futures	Hard	(Japan) Akira Santillan	(Spain) David Vega Hernández (Spain) Roberto Ortega Olmedo	6–2, 5–7, [10–2]
Loss	2–3	May 2017	Turkey F19, Antalya	Futures	Clay	(Republic of Ireland) Samuel Bothwell	(United Kingdom) Joel Cannell (Argentina) Manuel Pena Lopez	1–6, 6–4, [5–10]
Loss	2–4	Jul 2017	Ireland F1, Dublin	Futures	Carpet	(United Kingdom) Lloyd Glasspool	(United Kingdom) Scott Clayton (United Kingdom) Jonny O'Mara	1–6, 3–6
Loss	2–5	Sep 2017	Great Britain F4, Nottingham	Futures	Hard	(United Kingdom) Luke Johnson	(France) Jonathan Kanar (France) Romain Bauvy	3–6, 7–5, [8–10]
Loss	2–6	Sep 2017	Great Britain F5, Roehampton	Futures	Hard	(United Kingdom) Luke Johnson	(Monaco) Lucas Catarina (Switzerland) Adrian Bodmer	2–6, 2–6
Win	3–6	Oct 2017	Great Britain F6, Barnstaple	Futures	Hard	(United Kingdom) Neil Pauffley	(United Kingdom) Robert Carter (United Kingdom) Ryan Peniston	6–4, 6–7^{(5–7)}, [10–6]
Win	4–6	Oct 2017	Egypt F29, Sharm el-Sheikh	Futures	Hard	(Spain) David Pérez Sanz	(Belarus) Aliaksandr Liaonenka (Ukraine) Nikita Mashtakov	6–0, 6–3
Win	5–6	Mar 2018	Portugal F4, Quinta do Lago	Futures	Hard	(United Kingdom) Jack Findel-hawkins	(Portugal) Francisco Cabral (Portugal) Tiago Cação	7–6^{(7–5)}, 7–6^{(7–3)}
Loss	5–7	Apr 2019	M25 Sunderland, Great Britain	World Tennis Tour	Hard	(United Kingdom) Scott Duncan	(United States) Yates Johnson (United States) Hunter Johnson	4–6, 3–6
Win	6–7	May 2019	M15 Heraklion, Greece	World Tennis Tour	Hard	(United States) Henry Craig	(Spain) P Vivero Gonzalez (Spain) Andres Artunedo Martinavarro	4–6, 7–6^{(7–4)}, [10–4]
Win	7–7	Aug 2019	M15 Sintra, Portugal	World Tennis Tour	Hard	(France) Maxime Tchoutakian	(United Kingdom) Stuart Parker (Lithuania) Julius Tverijonas	6–3, 6–2
Loss	7–8	Aug 2019	M15 Sintra, Portugal	World Tennis Tour	Hard	(Brazil) B Azevedo P e O	(France) Maxime Tchoutakian (France) Antoine Escoffier	6–0, 2–6, [5–10]
Loss	7–9	Jan 2020	M15 Manacor, Spain	World Tennis Tour	Hard	(United Kingdom) Jonathan Gray	(United Kingdom) Evan Hoyt (United Kingdom) Jonathan Binding	3–6, 4–6
Win	8–9	Mar 2020	M15 Vale do Lobo, Portugal	World Tennis Tour	Hard	(United Kingdom) Billy Harris	(Spain) B Winter Lopez (Spain) Albert Roglan	6–3, 6–4
