= Majed Kilani =

Tunisian tennis player

- Country (sports): Tunisia
- Born: 1 January 1997 (age 28) Tunis, Tunisia
- College: University of Tulsa (2015–2019)
- Prize money: $19,302

Singles
- Career record: 0–0 (at ATP Tour level, Grand Slam level, and in Davis Cup)
- Career titles: 0
- Highest ranking: No. 800 (24 August 2020)

Doubles
- Career record: 0–0 (at ATP Tour level, Grand Slam level, and in Davis Cup)
- Career titles: 4 ITF
- Highest ranking: No. 527 (24 August 2020)

Team competitions
- Davis Cup: 4-0
- Last updated on: 18 january 2021.

Majed Kilani (born 1 January 1997) is a Tunisian tennis player.

== Career ==
Kilani has a career high ATP singles ranking of 800 achieved on 24 August 2020. He also has a career high ATP doubles ranking of 527, also achieved on 24 August 2020. Kilani has won 4 ITF doubles titles.

Kilani had studied at University of Tulsa, between 2015 and 2019.

Kilani has represented Tunisia at Davis Cup. In Davis Cup he has a win-loss record of 4–0.

In June 2020, Kilani was banned from professional tennis for 7 years and fined $7,000 for match-fixing and associated corruption charges.

== Future and Challenger finals ==
=== Doubles 7 (4–3) ===
Legend (doubles) ATP Challenger Tour (0–0) ITF Futures Tour (4–3)	Titles by surface Hard (2–3) Clay (2–0) Grass (0–0) Carpet (0–0)

Result	W–L	Date	Tournament	Tier	Surface	Partner	Opponents	Score
Loss	0–1	Mar 2015	Tunisia F9, El Kantaoui	Futures	Hard	(Tunisia) Anis Ghorbel	(Germany) Peter Heller (Belgium) Yannik Reuter	5–7, 1–6
Loss	0–2	Sep 2015	Tunisia F24, El Kantaoui	Futures	Hard	(Tunisia) Anis Ghorbel	(France) Antoine Hoang (France) Louis Tessa	4–6, 1–6
Win	1–2	Jun 2019	M15 Tabarka, Tunisia	World Tennis Tour	Clay	(United States) Toby Boyer	(Netherlands) Michiel de Krom (Tunisia) Anis Ghorbel	6–4, 1–1 ret.
Win	2–2	Aug 2019	M15 Tabarka, Tunisia	World Tennis Tour	Clay	(Tunisia) Anis Ghorbel	(Argentina) Franco Feitt (Argentina) Guido Iván Justo	6–4, 6–4
Loss	2–3	Nov 2019	M25 Monastir, Tunisia	World Tennis Tour	Hard	(Russia) Savriyan Danilov	(Tunisia) Aziz Dougaz (Burundi) Guy Orly Iradukunda	2–6, 1–6
Win	3–3	Nov 2019	M15 Monastir, Tunisia	World Tennis Tour	Hard	(France) Louis Tessa	(Netherlands) Daniel de Jonge (Belgium) Olivier Rojas	6–3, 6–4
Win	4–3	Feb 2020	M15 Monastir, Tunisia	World Tennis Tour	Hard	(Tunisia) Aziz Dougaz	(Spain) Alberto Barroso Campos (Spain) Benjamín Winter López	6–7^{(5–7)}, 6–4, [11–9]

== Davis Cup ==
=== Participations: (4–0) ===
Group membership World Group (0–0) WG Play-off (0–0) Group I (0–0) Group II (0–0) Group III (4–0) Group IV (0–0)	Matches by surface Hard (0–0) Clay (4–0) Grass (0–0) Carpet (0–0)	Matches by type Singles (2–0) Doubles (2–0)

- ▲ ▼ indicates the outcome of the Davis Cup match followed by the score, date, place of event, the zonal classification and its phase, and the court surface.

Rubber outcome	No.	Rubber	Match type (partner if any)	Opponent nation	Opponent player(s)	Score
▲3–0; 26 October 2015; Smash Tennis Academy, Cairo, Egypt; Africa Zone Group III Round robin; Clay surface
Victory	1	II	Singles	Algeria	Mohamed Hassan	6–1, 7–5
▲3–0; 27 October 2015; Smash Tennis Academy, Cairo, Egypt; Africa Zone Group III Round robin; Clay surface
Victory	2	III	Doubles (with Skander Mansouri) (dead rubber)	Namibia	Jacobus Serdyn / Gideon Van Dyk	6–0, 6–2
▲3–0; 28 October 2015; Smash Tennis Academy, Cairo, Egypt; Africa Zone Group III Round robin; Clay surface
Victory	3	I	Singles	Ghana	Japheth Bagerbaseh	6–1, 6–3
Victory	4	III	Doubles (with Aziz Dougaz) (dead rubber)	Ghana	George Darko / Wisdom Na-Adjrago	7–5, 7–6^{(7–1)}
