= Jordi Muñoz Abreu =

Spanish-Venezuelan tennis player

Jordi Muñoz
- Full name: Jordi Muñoz Abreu
- Country (sports): Venezuela (2012–present); Spain (2005–2012)
- Born: 17 January 1990 (age 35) Barcelona, Spain
- Plays: Left-handed (two handed-backhand)
- Prize money: $41,468

Singles
- Career record: 1–6 (at ATP Tour level, Grand Slam level, and in Davis Cup)
- Career titles: 0
- Highest ranking: No. 659 (20 October 2014)

Doubles
- Career record: 3–0 (at ATP Tour level, Grand Slam level, and in Davis Cup)
- Career titles: 15 ITF
- Highest ranking: No. 291 (14 November 2016)

Team competitions
- Davis Cup: 4–6

Jordi Muñoz Abreu (born 17 January 1990) is a Spanish-Venezuelan tennis player.

Muñoz Abreu has a career high ATP singles ranking of No. 659 achieved on 20 October 2014 and a career high ATP doubles ranking of No. 291 achieved on 14 November 2016.

Muñoz Abreu has represented Venezuela at the Davis Cup where he has a W/L record of 4–6.
