= Port El Kantaoui =

Seaside resort in Tunisia

Coordinates: 35.894°N 10.598°E

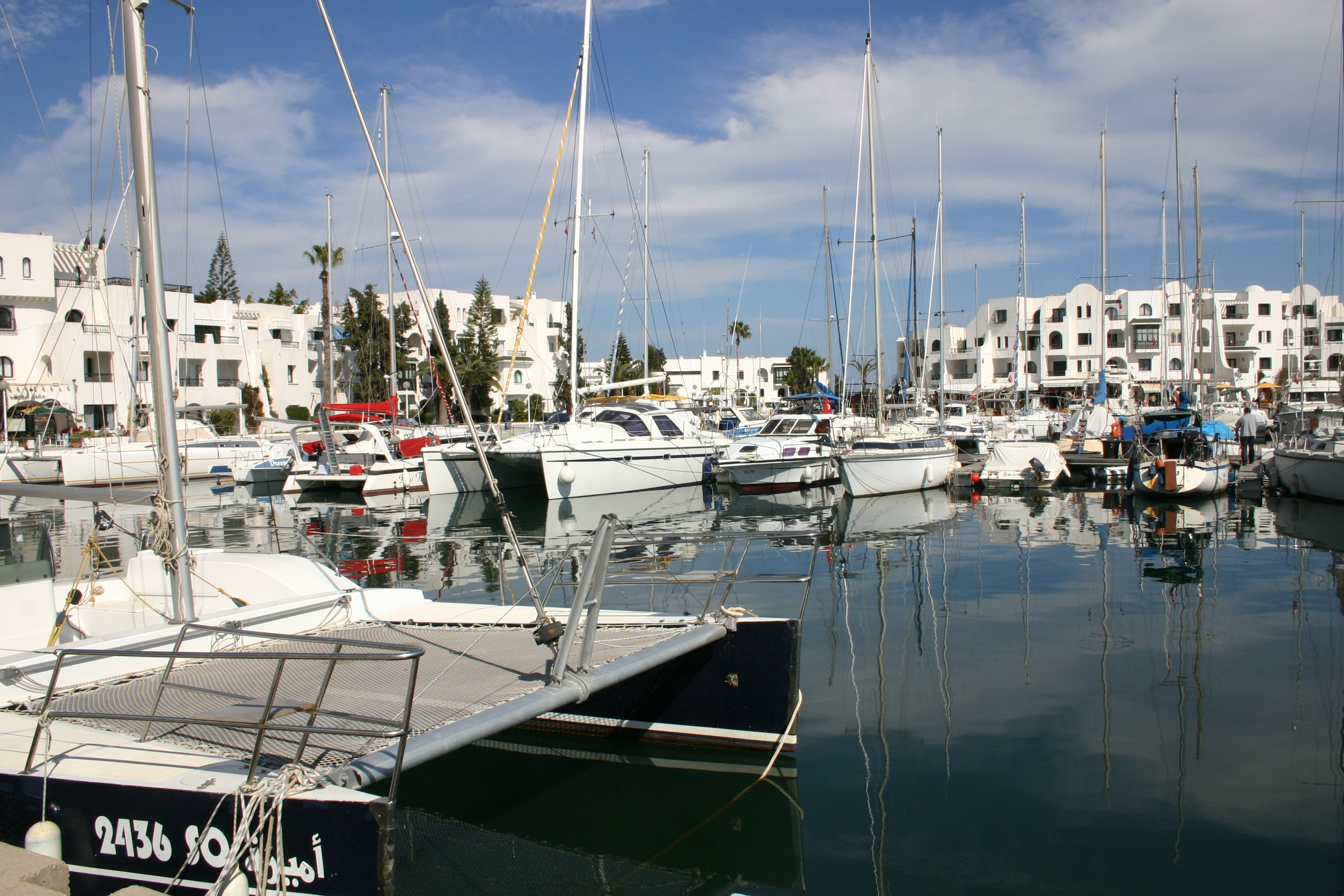
Port El Kantaoui Marina

Port El Kantaoui (Arabic: مرسى القنطاوي) is a tourist complex 10 kilometres north of Sousse city in central Tunisia. It was built in 1979 specifically as a tourist center, around a large artificial harbour that provides mooring with 340 berths for luxury yachts, hosting sporting activities from water skiing to paragliding, and several golf courses.

The architecture, although modern and dazzlingly white, has been modeled on the more traditional buildings in Tunisia, complete with narrow streets and arches. The hotels that line the beachfront extend from Sousse itself along miles of sparkling clean sea to the harbor of Port El Kantaoui and to the north of the harbor.

In style, the port area Port El Kantaoui is designed as a white and blue Tunisian style village with reproduced medina quarter and cobblestone streets. It is popular with package holiday visitors, families, and first-time visitors, however, its extensive landscaping and detachment from the true Tunisia bring critics; most notably the Rough Guide has described Port El Kantaoui as "Tunisia without tears ... artificial, soulless, even anemic".

In 2015, 39 people were killed when a lone terrorist gunman opened fire at two hotels (2015 Sousse attacks). This is the worst attack in the recent history of Tunisia since the Tunisian Revolution of 2010–2011. Most of those killed were tourists.
