= 2018 ITF Men's Circuit (April–June) =

The 2018 ITF Men's Circuit is the 2018 edition of the second-tier tour for men's professional tennis. It is organised by the International Tennis Federation and is a tier below the ATP Tour. The ITF Men's Circuit includes tournaments with prize money ranging from $15,000 up to $25,000.

== Key ==
$25,000 tournaments
$15,000 tournaments

== Month ==
=== April ===
| Week of | Tournament | Winner | Runners-up | Semifinalists | Quarterfinalists |
|---|---|---|---|---|---|
| April 2 | Italy F6 Futures; Pula, Italy; Clay $25,000; Singles and doubles draws | (Argentina) Juan Pablo Ficovich; 6–3, 7–6^{(7–5)} | (Italy) Luca Vanni | (Netherlands) Tallon Griekspoor (Argentina) Juan Ignacio Galarza | (Sweden) Christian Lindell (Serbia) Miljan Zekić (United Kingdom) Billy Harris (Croatia) Nino Serdarušić |
| April 2 | Italy F6 Futures; Pula, Italy; Clay $25,000; Singles and doubles draws | (Argentina) Juan Ignacio Galarza (Argentina) Mariano Kestelboim; 1–6, 6–4, [10–6] | (Italy) Gianluca Mager (Italy) Walter Trusendi | (Netherlands) Tallon Griekspoor (Argentina) Juan Ignacio Galarza | (Sweden) Christian Lindell (Serbia) Miljan Zekić (United Kingdom) Billy Harris (Croatia) Nino Serdarušić |
| April 2 | USA F9 Futures; Memphis, United States; Hard $25,000; Singles and doubles draws | (Netherlands) Scott Griekspoor; 6–7^{(3–7)}, 6–4, 7–5 | (Germany) Sebastian Fanselow | (United States) Henry Craig (United Kingdom) Jack Findel-Hawkins | (United States) Collin Altamirano (United Kingdom) Ryan Peniston (Brazil) José Pereira (Brazil) Karue Sell |
| April 2 | USA F9 Futures; Memphis, United States; Hard $25,000; Singles and doubles draws | (Sweden) André Göransson (France) Florian Lakat; 2–6, 6–2, [10–7] | (Netherlands) Scott Griekspoor (Belgium) Yannick Mertens | (United States) Henry Craig (United Kingdom) Jack Findel-Hawkins | (United States) Collin Altamirano (United Kingdom) Ryan Peniston (Brazil) José Pereira (Brazil) Karue Sell |
| April 2 | Egypt F12 Futures; Sharm El Sheikh, Egypt; Hard $15,000; Singles and doubles draws | (Russia) Teymuraz Gabashvili; 6–2, 6–3 | (Austria) Lucas Miedler | (United States) Peter Kobelt (Ukraine) Vladyslav Manafov | (South Africa) Siphosothando Montsi (Ukraine) Vladyslav Orlov (Egypt) Issam Haitham Taweel (Italy) Francesco Vilardo |
| April 2 | Egypt F12 Futures; Sharm El Sheikh, Egypt; Hard $15,000; Singles and doubles draws | (Russia) Teymuraz Gabashvili (Austria) Lucas Miedler; 6–4, 6–0 | (Ukraine) Marat Deviatiarov (Ukraine) Vladyslav Manafov | (United States) Peter Kobelt (Ukraine) Vladyslav Manafov | (South Africa) Siphosothando Montsi (Ukraine) Vladyslav Orlov (Egypt) Issam Haitham Taweel (Italy) Francesco Vilardo |
| April 2 | Japan F5 Futures; Kashiwa, Japan; Hard $15,000; Singles and doubles draws | (China) Li Zhe; 6–4, 6–7^{(5–7)}, 7–5 | (Japan) Yusuke Takahashi | (Japan) Makoto Ochi (Japan) Hiroyasu Ehara | (Japan) Ryota Tanuma (Japan) Taisei Ichikawa (Japan) Shintaro Imai (Japan) Shinji Hazawa |
| April 2 | Japan F5 Futures; Kashiwa, Japan; Hard $15,000; Singles and doubles draws | (Japan) Renta Tokuda (Japan) Jumpei Yamasaki; 3–6, 6–4, [10–7] | (Japan) Shinji Hazawa (Japan) Yuta Shimizu | (Japan) Makoto Ochi (Japan) Hiroyasu Ehara | (Japan) Ryota Tanuma (Japan) Taisei Ichikawa (Japan) Shintaro Imai (Japan) Shinji Hazawa |
| April 2 | Tunisia F13 Futures; Djerba, Tunisia; Hard $15,000; Singles and doubles draws | (France) David Guez; 6–4, 6–0 | (Spain) David Pérez Sanz | (France) Jonathan Kanar (Germany) Christoph Negritu | (Czech Republic) Matěj Vocel (Croatia) Fran Zvonimir Zgombić (Czech Republic) Michal Konečný (France) Clément Tabur |
| April 2 | Tunisia F13 Futures; Djerba, Tunisia; Hard $15,000; Singles and doubles draws | (Czech Republic) Michal Konečný (Czech Republic) Matěj Vocel; 6–3, 6–1 | (Colombia) Daniel Mora (Chile) Juan Carlos Sáez | (France) Jonathan Kanar (Germany) Christoph Negritu | (Czech Republic) Matěj Vocel (Croatia) Fran Zvonimir Zgombić (Czech Republic) Michal Konečný (France) Clément Tabur |
| April 2 | Turkey F13 Futures; Antalya, Turkey; Clay $15,000; Singles and doubles draws | (Austria) Thomas Statzberger; 6–4, 1–6, 7–5 | (Turkey) Marsel İlhan | (Italy) Roberto Marcora (Argentina) Juan Pablo Paz | (Brazil) Gilbert Soares Klier Júnior (France) Alexis Musialek (Argentina) Genaro Alberto Olivieri (United Kingdom) Ryan James Storrie |
| April 2 | Turkey F13 Futures; Antalya, Turkey; Clay $15,000; Singles and doubles draws | (Czech Republic) Vít Kopřiva (Czech Republic) Jaroslav Pospíšil; 6–2, 6–0 | (Argentina) Sebastián Báez (Argentina) Juan Pablo Paz | (Italy) Roberto Marcora (Argentina) Juan Pablo Paz | (Brazil) Gilbert Soares Klier Júnior (France) Alexis Musialek (Argentina) Genaro Alberto Olivieri (United Kingdom) Ryan James Storrie |
| April 9 | Italy F7 Futures; Pula, Italy; Clay $25,000; Singles and doubles draws | (Italy) Lorenzo Giustino; 6–4, 6–1 | (Italy) Gianluca Mager | (Netherlands) Tallon Griekspoor (Argentina) Andrea Collarini | (Slovakia) Filip Horanský (Bosnia and Herzegovina) Tomislav Brkić (Brazil) Bruno Sant'Anna (Romania) Bogdan Ionuț Apostol |
| April 9 | Italy F7 Futures; Pula, Italy; Clay $25,000; Singles and doubles draws | (Bosnia and Herzegovina) Tomislav Brkić (Serbia) Milan Radojković; 4–6, 6–3, [10–8] | (Argentina) Franco Capalbo (Argentina) Gerónimo Espín Busleiman | (Netherlands) Tallon Griekspoor (Argentina) Andrea Collarini | (Slovakia) Filip Horanský (Bosnia and Herzegovina) Tomislav Brkić (Brazil) Bruno Sant'Anna (Romania) Bogdan Ionuț Apostol |
| April 9 | Japan F6 Futures; Matsuyama, Japan; Hard $25,000; Singles and doubles draws | (Japan) Renta Tokuda; 6–0, 7–6^{(7–2)} | (Japan) Hiroyasu Ehara | (Japan) Kazuki Nishiwaki (Japan) Makoto Ochi | (Japan) Rimpei Kawakami (Japan) Sora Fukuda (Japan) Jumpei Yamasaki (Japan) Naoki Tajima |
| April 9 | Japan F6 Futures; Matsuyama, Japan; Hard $25,000; Singles and doubles draws | (Japan) Shintaro Imai (Japan) Takuto Niki; 6–4, 6–3 | (Japan) Yuhei Kono (Japan) Yuto Sakai | (Japan) Kazuki Nishiwaki (Japan) Makoto Ochi | (Japan) Rimpei Kawakami (Japan) Sora Fukuda (Japan) Jumpei Yamasaki (Japan) Naoki Tajima |
| April 9 | Portugal F7 Futures; Porto, Portugal; Clay $25,000; Singles and doubles draws | (Hungary) Attila Balázs; 6–0, 6–4 | (Argentina) Pedro Cachin | (Portugal) Frederico Ferreira Silva (France) Evan Furness | (Belgium) Yannick Vandenbulcke (Spain) Javier Barranco Cosano (France) Fabien Reboul (Belgium) Germain Gigounon |
| April 9 | Portugal F7 Futures; Porto, Portugal; Clay $25,000; Singles and doubles draws | (Belgium) Germain Gigounon (France) Tristan Lamasine; 5–7, 6–3, [11–9] | (Portugal) Francisco Cabral (Portugal) Tiago Cação | (Portugal) Frederico Ferreira Silva (France) Evan Furness | (Belgium) Yannick Vandenbulcke (Spain) Javier Barranco Cosano (France) Fabien Reboul (Belgium) Germain Gigounon |
| April 9 | USA F10 Futures; Little Rock, United States; Hard $25,000; Singles and doubles draws | (Brazil) Karue Sell; 7–5, 6–2 | (South Africa) Nicolaas Scholtz | (United States) Sam Riffice (United States) Harrison Adams | (Japan) Kaichi Uchida (United States) Michael Redlicki (United States) Henry Craig (United States) Collin Altamirano |
| April 9 | USA F10 Futures; Little Rock, United States; Hard $25,000; Singles and doubles draws | (United States) Collin Altamirano (United States) Vasil Kirkov; Walkover | (United States) Henry Craig (United States) Miles Seemann | (United States) Sam Riffice (United States) Harrison Adams | (Japan) Kaichi Uchida (United States) Michael Redlicki (United States) Henry Craig (United States) Collin Altamirano |
| April 9 | Egypt F13 Futures; Sharm El Sheikh, Egypt; Hard $15,000; Singles and doubles draws | (Spain) Andrés Artuñedo; 0–6, 7–6^{(9–7)}, 6–3 | (Austria) Lucas Miedler | (France) Tom Jomby (Chile) Michel Vernier | (United States) Peter Kobelt (Spain) Pablo Vivero González (Italy) Joy Vigani (Czech Republic) Petr Michnev |
| April 9 | Egypt F13 Futures; Sharm El Sheikh, Egypt; Hard $15,000; Singles and doubles draws | (France) Tom Jomby (France) Mick Lescure; 6–4, 6–4 | (Austria) Peter Goldsteiner (Austria) Lucas Miedler | (France) Tom Jomby (Chile) Michel Vernier | (United States) Peter Kobelt (Spain) Pablo Vivero González (Italy) Joy Vigani (Czech Republic) Petr Michnev |
| April 9 | Kazakhstan F3 Futures; Shymkent, Kazakhstan; Clay $15,000; Singles and doubles draws | (Kazakhstan) Denis Yevseyev; 6–4, 5–7, 6–4 | (Russia) Ivan Gakhov | (Russia) Pavel Kotov (Belarus) Dzmitry Zhyrmont | (Russia) Yan Sabanin (Russia) Evgenii Tiurnev (South Korea) Song Min-kyu (Russia) Artem Dubrivnyy |
| April 9 | Kazakhstan F3 Futures; Shymkent, Kazakhstan; Clay $15,000; Singles and doubles draws | (South Korea) Seol Jae-min (South Korea) Song Min-kyu; 7–5, 6–3 | (Kazakhstan) Timur Khabibulin (Belarus) Dzmitry Zhyrmont | (Russia) Pavel Kotov (Belarus) Dzmitry Zhyrmont | (Russia) Yan Sabanin (Russia) Evgenii Tiurnev (South Korea) Song Min-kyu (Russia) Artem Dubrivnyy |
| April 9 | Tunisia F14 Futures; Djerba, Tunisia; Hard $15,000; Singles and doubles draws | (Germany) Daniel Brands; 7–6^{(7–3)}, 7–5 | (Argentina) Mateo Nicolás Martínez | (France) Yannick Jankovits (France) Baptiste Crepatte | (Spain) Jaime Pulgar-García (Czech Republic) Michael Vrbenský (Germany) Christoph Negritu (France) Hugo Voljacques |
| April 9 | Tunisia F14 Futures; Djerba, Tunisia; Hard $15,000; Singles and doubles draws | (France) Dan Added (France) Hugo Voljacques; 6–3, 6–3 | (Sweden) Daniel Appelgren (Germany) Daniel Brands | (France) Yannick Jankovits (France) Baptiste Crepatte | (Spain) Jaime Pulgar-García (Czech Republic) Michael Vrbenský (Germany) Christoph Negritu (France) Hugo Voljacques |
| April 9 | Turkey F14 Futures; Antalya, Turkey; Clay $15,000; Singles and doubles draws | (Croatia) Nino Serdarušić; 6–2, 2–6, 6–3 | (Czech Republic) Jaroslav Pospíšil | (France) Alexis Musialek (Argentina) Sebastián Báez | (Germany) Rudolf Molleker (Austria) Thomas Statzberger (Germany) Marc Sieber (Serbia) Milan Drinić |
| April 9 | Turkey F14 Futures; Antalya, Turkey; Clay $15,000; Singles and doubles draws | (Russia) Alexander Boborykin (Russia) Timur Kiyamov; 7–6^{(7–4)}, 4–6, [10–8] | (Austria) Pascal Brunner (Germany) Marc Sieber | (France) Alexis Musialek (Argentina) Sebastián Báez | (Germany) Rudolf Molleker (Austria) Thomas Statzberger (Germany) Marc Sieber (Serbia) Milan Drinić |
| April 16 | Italy F8 Futures; Pula, Italy; Clay $25,000; Singles and doubles draws | (Argentina) Hernán Casanova; 7–6^{(7–5)}, 6–2 | (Argentina) Andrea Collarini | (Bosnia and Herzegovina) Tomislav Brkić (Slovakia) Filip Horanský | (Austria) Lenny Hampel (Croatia) Mate Delić (Brazil) Bruno Sant'Anna (Poland) Maciej Smoła |
| April 16 | Italy F8 Futures; Pula, Italy; Clay $25,000; Singles and doubles draws | (Argentina) Juan Pablo Ficovich (Argentina) Juan Ignacio Galarza; 6–7^{(9–11)}, 6–3, [10–2] | (Austria) Lenny Hampel (Czech Republic) Robin Staněk | (Bosnia and Herzegovina) Tomislav Brkić (Slovakia) Filip Horanský | (Austria) Lenny Hampel (Croatia) Mate Delić (Brazil) Bruno Sant'Anna (Poland) Maciej Smoła |
| April 16 | Nigeria F1 Futures; Abuja, Nigeria; Hard $25,000+H; Singles and doubles draws | (Brazil) João Menezes; 6–2, 6–4 | (Sweden) Markus Eriksson | (France) Jaimee Floyd Angele (Ukraine) Danylo Kalenichenko | (Netherlands) Jelle Sels (Netherlands) Stephan Gerritsen (Namibia) Tukhula Jacobs (Austria) Maximilian Neuchrist |
| April 16 | Nigeria F1 Futures; Abuja, Nigeria; Hard $25,000+H; Singles and doubles draws | (Sweden) Markus Eriksson (Austria) Maximilian Neuchrist; 6–3, 4–6, [15–13] | (France) Rémi Boutillier (France) Tom Jomby | (France) Jaimee Floyd Angele (Ukraine) Danylo Kalenichenko | (Netherlands) Jelle Sels (Netherlands) Stephan Gerritsen (Namibia) Tukhula Jacobs (Austria) Maximilian Neuchrist |
| April 16 | Portugal F8 Futures; Cascais, Portugal; Clay $25,000; Singles and doubles draws | (Portugal) Frederico Ferreira Silva; 6–2, 3–6, 6–3 | (Portugal) Tiago Cação | (Netherlands) Miliaan Niesten (Spain) Eduard Esteve Lobato | (Republic of Ireland) Sam Barry (Portugal) João Monteiro (France) Grégoire Barrère (Argentina) Marco Trungelliti |
| April 16 | Portugal F8 Futures; Cascais, Portugal; Clay $25,000; Singles and doubles draws | (Belgium) Niels Desein (Netherlands) Boy Westerhof; 7–6^{(7–4)}, 6–2 | (Belgium) Germain Gigounon (France) Tristan Lamasine | (Netherlands) Miliaan Niesten (Spain) Eduard Esteve Lobato | (Republic of Ireland) Sam Barry (Portugal) João Monteiro (France) Grégoire Barrère (Argentina) Marco Trungelliti |
| April 16 | Spain F9 Futures; Madrid, Spain; Clay $25,000; Singles and doubles draws | (Spain) Mario Vilella Martínez; 6–4, 6–0 | (Argentina) Pedro Cachin | (Spain) Javier Barranco Cosano (Spain) Javier Martí | (Canada) Steven Diez (Italy) Raúl Brancaccio (Chile) Juan Carlos Sáez (Argentina) Patricio Heras |
| April 16 | Spain F9 Futures; Madrid, Spain; Clay $25,000; Singles and doubles draws | (Argentina) Pedro Cachin (Argentina) Patricio Heras; 7–6^{(7–2)}, 3–6, [10–7] | (Ecuador) Diego Hidalgo (Chile) Juan Carlos Sáez | (Spain) Javier Barranco Cosano (Spain) Javier Martí | (Canada) Steven Diez (Italy) Raúl Brancaccio (Chile) Juan Carlos Sáez (Argentina) Patricio Heras |
| April 16 | Uzbekistan F1 Futures; Bukhara, Uzbekistan; Hard $25,000; Singles and doubles draws | (Japan) Hiroki Moriya; 6–0, 6–1 | (Russia) Evgenii Tiurnev | (Belarus) Yaraslav Shyla (Russia) Konstantin Kravchuk | (Russia) Roman Safiullin (Belarus) Dzmitry Zhyrmont (Uzbekistan) Khumoyun Sultanov (Uzbekistan) Sanjar Fayziev |
| April 16 | Uzbekistan F1 Futures; Bukhara, Uzbekistan; Hard $25,000; Singles and doubles draws | (Russia) Alexander Pavlioutchenkov (Russia) Evgenii Tiurnev; 7–6^{(7–4)}, 6–7^{(5–7)}, [10–8] | (Serbia) Nikola Ćaćić (Switzerland) Luca Margaroli | (Belarus) Yaraslav Shyla (Russia) Konstantin Kravchuk | (Russia) Roman Safiullin (Belarus) Dzmitry Zhyrmont (Uzbekistan) Khumoyun Sultanov (Uzbekistan) Sanjar Fayziev |
| April 16 | Egypt F14 Futures; Sharm El Sheikh, Egypt; Hard $15,000; Singles and doubles draws | (Italy) Alessandro Bega; 6–4, 6–3 | (Czech Republic) David Poljak | (Ukraine) Marat Deviatiarov (United Kingdom) Evan Hoyt | (Chile) Michel Vernier (Czech Republic) Petr Michnev (United States) Dusty Boyer (Spain) Pablo Vivero González |
| April 16 | Egypt F14 Futures; Sharm El Sheikh, Egypt; Hard $15,000; Singles and doubles draws | (United States) Dusty Boyer (United Kingdom) Evan Hoyt; 6–3, 6–4 | (Germany) Christian Hirschmüller (Italy) Joy Vigani | (Ukraine) Marat Deviatiarov (United Kingdom) Evan Hoyt | (Chile) Michel Vernier (Czech Republic) Petr Michnev (United States) Dusty Boyer (Spain) Pablo Vivero González |
| April 16 | France F7 Futures; La Grande-Motte, France; Hard $15,000; Singles and doubles draws | (France) Sébastien Boltz; 6–4, 6–3 | (France) Yannick Jankovits | (Belgium) Maxime Authom (Netherlands) Gijs Brouwer | (France) Nathan Seateun (France) Alexis Gautier (France) Mick Lescure (France) Tak Khunn Wang |
| April 16 | France F7 Futures; La Grande-Motte, France; Hard $15,000; Singles and doubles draws | (France) Sébastien Boltz (France) Clément Larrière; 6–2, 4–6, [10–3] | (Germany) Sami Reinwein (France) Tak Khunn Wang | (Belgium) Maxime Authom (Netherlands) Gijs Brouwer | (France) Nathan Seateun (France) Alexis Gautier (France) Mick Lescure (France) Tak Khunn Wang |
| April 16 | Kazakhstan F4 Futures; Shymkent, Kazakhstan; Clay $15,000; Singles and doubles draws | (Kazakhstan) Denis Yevseyev; 7–5, 6–1 | (Russia) Pavel Kotov | (Kazakhstan) Grigoriy Lomakin (Russia) Teymuraz Gabashvili | (Russia) Ivan Gakhov (Russia) Bogdan Bobrov (Russia) Artem Dubrivnyy (Switzerland) Johan Nikles |
| April 16 | Kazakhstan F4 Futures; Shymkent, Kazakhstan; Clay $15,000; Singles and doubles draws | (Georgia (country)) Aleksandre Metreveli (Kazakhstan) Denis Yevseyev; 5–7, 7–6^{(7–4)}, [10–6] | (Russia) Denis Klok (Russia) Vladimir Korolev | (Kazakhstan) Grigoriy Lomakin (Russia) Teymuraz Gabashvili | (Russia) Ivan Gakhov (Russia) Bogdan Bobrov (Russia) Artem Dubrivnyy (Switzerland) Johan Nikles |
| April 16 | Tunisia F15 Futures; Djerba, Tunisia; Hard $15,000; Singles and doubles draws | (Germany) Daniel Brands; 7–6^{(7–5)}, 6–1 | (France) Baptiste Crepatte | (United Kingdom) Luke Johnson (France) Damien Bayard | (Italy) Francesco Vilardo (Belgium) Maxime Pauwels (United Kingdom) Finn Bass (Argentina) Matías Franco Descotte |
| April 16 | Tunisia F15 Futures; Djerba, Tunisia; Hard $15,000; Singles and doubles draws | (France) Dan Added (France) Hugo Voljacques; 6–1, 6–3 | (Turkey) Altuğ Çelikbilek (Slovakia) Juraj Masár | (United Kingdom) Luke Johnson (France) Damien Bayard | (Italy) Francesco Vilardo (Belgium) Maxime Pauwels (United Kingdom) Finn Bass (Argentina) Matías Franco Descotte |
| April 16 | Turkey F15 Futures; Antalya, Turkey; Clay $15,000; Singles and doubles draws | (Croatia) Nino Serdarušić; 7–5, 6–2 | (Germany) Rudolf Molleker | (Czech Republic) Pavel Nejedlý (Germany) Paul Wörner | (Sweden) Filip Bergevi (North Macedonia) Tomislav Jotovski (Italy) Riccardo Bonadio (Austria) Pascal Brunner |
| April 16 | Turkey F15 Futures; Antalya, Turkey; Clay $15,000; Singles and doubles draws | (Italy) Omar Giacalone (Italy) Jacopo Stefanini; 4–6, 6–4, [10–5] | (Italy) Riccardo Bonadio (Italy) Lorenzo Frigerio | (Czech Republic) Pavel Nejedlý (Germany) Paul Wörner | (Sweden) Filip Bergevi (North Macedonia) Tomislav Jotovski (Italy) Riccardo Bonadio (Austria) Pascal Brunner |
| April 16 | USA F11 Futures; Orange Park, United States; Clay $15,000; Singles and doubles draws | (Chile) Marcelo Tomás Barrios Vera; 6–3, 6–4 | (United States) Noah Rubin | (Brazil) José Pereira (France) Samuel Bensoussan | (Argentina) Santiago Rodríguez Taverna (Chile) Alejandro Tabilo (Argentina) Eduardo Agustín Torre (Venezuela) Ricardo Rodríguez |
| April 16 | USA F11 Futures; Orange Park, United States; Clay $15,000; Singles and doubles draws | (United States) Christopher Haworth (United States) Isaiah Strode; 6–4, 1–6, [11–9] | (United States) Nick Chappell (United States) Raleigh Smith | (Brazil) José Pereira (France) Samuel Bensoussan | (Argentina) Santiago Rodríguez Taverna (Chile) Alejandro Tabilo (Argentina) Eduardo Agustín Torre (Venezuela) Ricardo Rodríguez |
| April 23 | France F8 Futures; Angers, France; Clay (indoor) $25,000; Singles and doubles draws | (France) Grégoire Barrère; 6–7^{(2–7)}, 7–6^{(7–5)}, 6–4 | (France) Johan Tatlot | (France) Mick Lescure (France) Grégoire Jacq | (France) Vincent Millot (Monaco) Lucas Catarina (Belgium) Jonas Merckx (France) Maxime Chazal |
| April 23 | France F8 Futures; Angers, France; Clay (indoor) $25,000; Singles and doubles draws | (Belgium) Jonas Merckx (Belgium) Jeroen Vanneste; 6–3, 6–4 | (France) Matteo Martineau (France) Johan Tatlot | (France) Mick Lescure (France) Grégoire Jacq | (France) Vincent Millot (Monaco) Lucas Catarina (Belgium) Jonas Merckx (France) Maxime Chazal |
| April 23 | Italy F9 Futures; Pula, Italy; Clay $25,000; Singles and doubles draws | (Argentina) Hernán Casanova; 6–3, 6–3 | (Switzerland) Adrian Bodmer | (Germany) Elmar Ejupovic (Italy) Giovanni Fonio | (Argentina) Juan Pablo Paz (Italy) Enrico Dalla Valle (United Kingdom) Billy Harris (France) Laurent Lokoli |
| April 23 | Italy F9 Futures; Pula, Italy; Clay $25,000; Singles and doubles draws | (United States) Sekou Bangoura (Poland) Szymon Walków; 6–4, 6–4 | (Romania) Vasile Antonescu (Romania) Patrick Grigoriu | (Germany) Elmar Ejupovic (Italy) Giovanni Fonio | (Argentina) Juan Pablo Paz (Italy) Enrico Dalla Valle (United Kingdom) Billy Harris (France) Laurent Lokoli |
| April 23 | Nigeria F2 Futures; Abuja, Nigeria; Hard $25,000+H; Singles and doubles draws | (Austria) Maximilian Neuchrist; 6–3, 6–7^{(5–7)}, 6–2 | (Brazil) João Menezes | (Egypt) Youssef Hossam (Netherlands) Stephan Gerritsen | (India) Suraj Prabodh (Zimbabwe) Takanyi Garanganga (India) Aryan Goveas (Sweden) Markus Eriksson |
| April 23 | Nigeria F2 Futures; Abuja, Nigeria; Hard $25,000+H; Singles and doubles draws | (India) Arjun Kadhe (United States) Ronnie Schneider; 6–2, 6–3 | (Ukraine) Danylo Kalenichenko (Switzerland) Mirko Martinez | (Egypt) Youssef Hossam (Netherlands) Stephan Gerritsen | (India) Suraj Prabodh (Zimbabwe) Takanyi Garanganga (India) Aryan Goveas (Sweden) Markus Eriksson |
| April 23 | Spain F10 Futures; Majadahonda, Spain; Clay $25,000; Singles and doubles draws | (Canada) Steven Diez; 6–3, 3–6, 7–5 | (Argentina) Pedro Cachin | (Spain) Carlos Boluda-Purkiss (Spain) Mario Vilella Martínez | (France) Sadio Doumbia (Spain) Jaume Pla Malfeito (Italy) Raúl Brancaccio (France) Fabien Reboul |
| April 23 | Spain F10 Futures; Majadahonda, Spain; Clay $25,000; Singles and doubles draws | (Spain) Marc Giner (Spain) Jaume Pla Malfeito; 2–6, 7–6^{(8–6)}, [13–11] | (Spain) Sergio Martos Gornés (Ukraine) Oleg Prihodko | (Spain) Carlos Boluda-Purkiss (Spain) Mario Vilella Martínez | (France) Sadio Doumbia (Spain) Jaume Pla Malfeito (Italy) Raúl Brancaccio (France) Fabien Reboul |
| April 23 | Uzbekistan F2 Futures; Qarshi, Uzbekistan; Hard $25,000; Singles and doubles draws | (India) Saketh Myneni; 4–6, 6–3, 7–6^{(7–4)} | (Belarus) Yaraslav Shyla | (Uzbekistan) Jurabek Karimov (Russia) Konstantin Kravchuk | (Japan) Hiroki Moriya (Russia) Evgenii Tiurnev (Belarus) Dzmitry Zhyrmont (Uzbekistan) Sanjar Fayziev |
| April 23 | Uzbekistan F2 Futures; Qarshi, Uzbekistan; Hard $25,000; Singles and doubles draws | (Russia) Konstantin Kravchuk (Russia) Roman Safiullin; 3–6, 7–5, [10–7] | (India) Saketh Myneni (India) Vijay Sundar Prashanth | (Uzbekistan) Jurabek Karimov (Russia) Konstantin Kravchuk | (Japan) Hiroki Moriya (Russia) Evgenii Tiurnev (Belarus) Dzmitry Zhyrmont (Uzbekistan) Sanjar Fayziev |
| April 23 | Brazil F1 Futures; São José do Rio Preto, Brazil; Clay $15,000; Singles and doubles draws | (Brazil) Thiago Seyboth Wild; 7–6^{(7–5)}, 6–1 | (Argentina) Camilo Ugo Carabelli | (Brazil) Daniel Dutra da Silva (Sweden) Christian Lindell | (Brazil) João Lucas Reis da Silva (Brazil) Rafael Matos (Brazil) Oscar José Gutierrez (Brazil) Wilson Leite |
| April 23 | Brazil F1 Futures; São José do Rio Preto, Brazil; Clay $15,000; Singles and doubles draws | (Brazil) Rafael Matos (Brazil) Marcelo Zormann; 6–1, 6–4 | (Brazil) Pedro Bernardi (Brazil) Daniel Dutra da Silva | (Brazil) Daniel Dutra da Silva (Sweden) Christian Lindell | (Brazil) João Lucas Reis da Silva (Brazil) Rafael Matos (Brazil) Oscar José Gutierrez (Brazil) Wilson Leite |
| April 23 | Egypt F15 Futures; Cairo, Egypt; Clay $15,000; Singles and doubles draws | (Spain) Pol Toledo Bagué; 6–4, 6–2 | (Croatia) Duje Kekez | (Italy) Marco Bortolotti (Russia) Alexander Zhurbin | (Austria) Thomas Statzberger (Russia) Zakhar Trapeznikov (Italy) Nicolò Turchetti (France) Maxence Brovillé |
| April 23 | Egypt F15 Futures; Cairo, Egypt; Clay $15,000; Singles and doubles draws | (Italy) Marco Bortolotti (Italy) Nicolò Turchetti; 6–7^{(4–7)}, 6–2, [10–5] | (France) Florent Diep (Spain) Pol Toledo Bagué | (Italy) Marco Bortolotti (Russia) Alexander Zhurbin | (Austria) Thomas Statzberger (Russia) Zakhar Trapeznikov (Italy) Nicolò Turchetti (France) Maxence Brovillé |
| April 23 | Israel F4 Futures; Ramat HaSharon, Israel; Hard $15,000; Singles and doubles draws | (Italy) Alessandro Bega; 6–3, 6–1 | (Ukraine) Marat Deviatiarov | (Israel) Mor Bulis (France) Clément Larrière | (Finland) Patrik Niklas-Salminen (United Kingdom) Joshua Paris (Argentina) Matías Franco Descotte (France) Baptise Crepatte |
| April 23 | Israel F4 Futures; Ramat HaSharon, Israel; Hard $15,000; Singles and doubles draws | (Finland) Patrik Niklas-Salminen (Ukraine) Vladyslav Orlov; 6–3, 7–5 | (Germany) Johannes Härteis (Argentina) Nicolás Uryson | (Israel) Mor Bulis (France) Clément Larrière | (Finland) Patrik Niklas-Salminen (United Kingdom) Joshua Paris (Argentina) Matías Franco Descotte (France) Baptise Crepatte |
| April 23 | Kazakhstan F5 Futures; Shymkent, Kazakhstan; Clay $15,000; Singles and doubles draws | (Kazakhstan) Denis Yevseyev; 6–2, 6–3 | (Russia) Teymuraz Gabashvili | (Kazakhstan) Roman Khassanov (Russia) Denis Klok | (Russia) Matvey Minin (Russia) Vladimir Korolev (Russia) Matvey Khomentovskiy (Belarus) Mikalai Haliak |
| April 23 | Kazakhstan F5 Futures; Shymkent, Kazakhstan; Clay $15,000; Singles and doubles draws | (Russia) Ivan Gakhov (Kazakhstan) Roman Khassanov; 5–7, 6–2, [11–9] | (Ukraine) Oleksandr Bielinskyi (Russia) Yan Sabanin | (Kazakhstan) Roman Khassanov (Russia) Denis Klok | (Russia) Matvey Minin (Russia) Vladimir Korolev (Russia) Matvey Khomentovskiy (Belarus) Mikalai Haliak |
| April 23 | Tunisia F16 Futures; Djerba, Tunisia; Hard $15,000; Singles and doubles draws | (Turkey) Altuğ Çelikbilek; 6–7^{(4–7)}, 6–3, 6–4 | (Belgium) Yannick Mertens | (United Kingdom) Aidan McHugh (United Kingdom) Neil Pauffley | (France) Damien Bayard (Portugal) Bernardo Saraiva (France) Louis Tessa (France) Maxime Tchoutakian |
| April 23 | Tunisia F16 Futures; Djerba, Tunisia; Hard $15,000; Singles and doubles draws | (Portugal) Bernardo Saraiva (Netherlands) Sem Verbeek; 6–3, 6–1 | (Croatia) Domagoj Bilješko (Turkey) Altuğ Çelikbilek | (United Kingdom) Aidan McHugh (United Kingdom) Neil Pauffley | (France) Damien Bayard (Portugal) Bernardo Saraiva (France) Louis Tessa (France) Maxime Tchoutakian |
| April 23 | Turkey F16 Futures; Antalya, Turkey; Clay $15,000; Singles and doubles draws | (Slovenia) Nik Razboršek; 6–3, 6–4 | (Ukraine) Artem Smirnov | (Italy) Mirko Cutuli (Italy) Omar Giacalone | (Turkey) Marsel İlhan (Italy) Davide Galoppini (Italy) Riccardo Bonadio (Germany) Marc Sieber |
| April 23 | Turkey F16 Futures; Antalya, Turkey; Clay $15,000; Singles and doubles draws | (Russia) Alexander Boborykin (Russia) Timur Kiyamov; 6–3, 4–6, [10–8] | (Ukraine) Vitaliy Sachko (Ukraine) Artem Smirnov | (Italy) Mirko Cutuli (Italy) Omar Giacalone | (Turkey) Marsel İlhan (Italy) Davide Galoppini (Italy) Riccardo Bonadio (Germany) Marc Sieber |
| April 23 | USA F12 Futures; Vero Beach, United States; Clay $15,000; Singles and doubles draws | (Colombia) Juan Manuel Benítez Chavarriaga; 7–5, 2–6, 6–4 | (Venezuela) Ricardo Rodríguez | (Chile) Marcelo Tomás Barrios Vera (United States) Strong Kirchheimer | (United States) Junior Alexander Ore (Argentina) Eduardo Agustín Torre (Chile) Alejandro Tabilo (Colombia) Nicolás Mejía |
| April 23 | USA F12 Futures; Vero Beach, United States; Clay $15,000; Singles and doubles draws | (United States) Harrison Adams (United States) Nick Chappell; 6–4, 7–6^{(9–7)} | (United States) Junior Alexander Ore (United States) Miles Seemann | (Chile) Marcelo Tomás Barrios Vera (United States) Strong Kirchheimer | (United States) Junior Alexander Ore (Argentina) Eduardo Agustín Torre (Chile) Alejandro Tabilo (Colombia) Nicolás Mejía |
| April 30 | Nigeria F3 Futures; Abuja, Nigeria; Hard $25,000+H; Singles and doubles draws | (Brazil) João Menezes; 6–3, 6–1 | (India) Arjun Kadhe | (India) Suraj Prabodh (Tunisia) Moez Echargui | (Egypt) Youssef Hossam (Netherlands) Jelle Sels (Austria) Maximilian Neuchrist (Egypt) Karim-Mohamed Maamoun |
| April 30 | Nigeria F3 Futures; Abuja, Nigeria; Hard $25,000+H; Singles and doubles draws | (France) Rémi Boutillier (France) Tom Jomby; 4–6, 7–6^{(7–3)}, 6–3 | (India) Arjun Kadhe (United States) Ronnie Schneider | (India) Suraj Prabodh (Tunisia) Moez Echargui | (Egypt) Youssef Hossam (Netherlands) Jelle Sels (Austria) Maximilian Neuchrist (Egypt) Karim-Mohamed Maamoun |
| April 30 | Brazil F2 Futures; São Paulo, Brazil; Clay $15,000; Singles and doubles draws | (Brazil) Rafael Matos; 6–1, 6–3 | (Argentina) Gonzalo Villanueva | (Brazil) Oscar José Gutierrez (Brazil) Igor Marcondes | (Brazil) Marcelo Zormann (Brazil) Pedro Sakamoto (Switzerland) Aaron Schmid (Brazil) Carlos Eduardo Severino |
| April 30 | Brazil F2 Futures; São Paulo, Brazil; Clay $15,000; Singles and doubles draws | (Brazil) Rafael Matos (Brazil) Marcelo Zormann; 7–5, 3–6, [10–4] | (Brazil) Eduardo Dischinger (Brazil) Wilson Leite | (Brazil) Oscar José Gutierrez (Brazil) Igor Marcondes | (Brazil) Marcelo Zormann (Brazil) Pedro Sakamoto (Switzerland) Aaron Schmid (Brazil) Carlos Eduardo Severino |
| April 30 | China F4 Futures; Wuhan, China; Hard $15,000; Singles and doubles draws | (China) Te Rigele; 6–3, 7–6^{(7–4)} | (China) He Yecong | (South Korea) Kim Cheong-eui (Japan) Yuta Shimizu | (China) Zeng Shihong (New Zealand) Olly Sadler (China) Sun Fajing (China) Wang Chuhan |
| April 30 | China F4 Futures; Wuhan, China; Hard $15,000; Singles and doubles draws | (Japan) Yuta Shimizu (China) Te Rigele; 7–6^{(7–3)}, 6–3 | (China) Sun Fajing (China) Wang Ruikai | (South Korea) Kim Cheong-eui (Japan) Yuta Shimizu | (China) Zeng Shihong (New Zealand) Olly Sadler (China) Sun Fajing (China) Wang Chuhan |
| April 30 | Egypt F16 Futures; Cairo, Egypt; Clay $15,000; Singles and doubles draws | (Brazil) Jordan Correia; 6–2, 6–4 | (Russia) Ronald Slobodchikov | (Italy) Marco Bortolotti (Spain) Pol Toledo Bagué | (Austria) Thomas Statzberger (Croatia) Duje Kekez (Russia) Alexander Igoshin (Italy) Nicolò Turchetti |
| April 30 | Egypt F16 Futures; Cairo, Egypt; Clay $15,000; Singles and doubles draws | (Brazil) Orlando Luz (Brazil) Felipe Meligeni Alves; 6–3, 6–4 | (Italy) Marco Bortolotti (Italy) Nicolò Turchetti | (Italy) Marco Bortolotti (Spain) Pol Toledo Bagué | (Austria) Thomas Statzberger (Croatia) Duje Kekez (Russia) Alexander Igoshin (Italy) Nicolò Turchetti |
| April 30 | France F9 Futures; Grasse, France; Clay $15,000; Singles and doubles draws | (France) Johan Tatlot; 6–4, 6–1 | (Russia) Alen Avidzba | (France) Corentin Denolly (France) Maxime Tabatruong | (France) Alexandre Müller (France) Maxime Chazal (France) Laurent Lokoli (Monaco) Lucas Catarina |
| April 30 | France F9 Futures; Grasse, France; Clay $15,000; Singles and doubles draws | (France) Hugo Gaston (France) Clément Tabur; 6–2, 6–4 | (France) Corentin Denolly (France) Alexandre Müller | (France) Corentin Denolly (France) Maxime Tabatruong | (France) Alexandre Müller (France) Maxime Chazal (France) Laurent Lokoli (Monaco) Lucas Catarina |
| April 30 | Israel F5 Futures; Akko, Israel; Hard $15,000; Singles and doubles draws | (United States) Peter Kobelt; 6–3, 6–2 | (Argentina) Matías Franco Descotte | (Israel) Mor Bulis (Germany) Johannes Härteis | (France) Hugo Voljacques (France) Clément Larrière (Argentina) Nicolás Uryson (France) Sébastien Boltz |
| April 30 | Israel F5 Futures; Akko, Israel; Hard $15,000; Singles and doubles draws | (Germany) Johannes Härteis (France) Clément Larrière; 6–4, 6–7^{(5–7)}, [10–6] | (Argentina) Matías Franco Descotte (United States) Michael Zhu | (Israel) Mor Bulis (Germany) Johannes Härteis | (France) Hugo Voljacques (France) Clément Larrière (Argentina) Nicolás Uryson (France) Sébastien Boltz |
| April 30 | Poland F1 Futures; Wisła, Poland; Clay $15,000; Singles and doubles draws | (Belgium) Zizou Bergs; 3–6, 6–1, 6–2 | (Czech Republic) Michael Vrbenský | (Germany) Peter Heller (Poland) Michał Dembek | (Spain) Jordi Samper Montaña (Latvia) Mārtiņš Podžus (Germany) Pascal Meis (Netherlands) Guy den Heijer |
| April 30 | Poland F1 Futures; Wisła, Poland; Clay $15,000; Singles and doubles draws | (Hungary) Gábor Borsos (Poland) Paweł Ciaś; 6–1, 7–5 | (Poland) Daniel Kossek (Poland) Maciej Smoła | (Germany) Peter Heller (Poland) Michał Dembek | (Spain) Jordi Samper Montaña (Latvia) Mārtiņš Podžus (Germany) Pascal Meis (Netherlands) Guy den Heijer |
| April 30 | Tunisia F17 Futures; Djerba, Tunisia; Hard $15,000; Singles and doubles draws | (Spain) Andrés Artuñedo; 2–6, 7–5, 6–3 | (France) Maxime Tchoutakian | (United Kingdom) Finn Bass (Netherlands) Sem Verbeek | (Spain) Jaime Pulgar-García (France) Louis Tessa (Republic of Ireland) Peter Bothwell (Argentina) Ignacio Carou |
| April 30 | Tunisia F17 Futures; Djerba, Tunisia; Hard $15,000; Singles and doubles draws | (Portugal) Bernardo Saraiva (Netherlands) Sem Verbeek; 7–5, 6–3 | (Argentina) Ignacio Carou (Ecuador) Diego Hidalgo | (United Kingdom) Finn Bass (Netherlands) Sem Verbeek | (Spain) Jaime Pulgar-García (France) Louis Tessa (Republic of Ireland) Peter Bothwell (Argentina) Ignacio Carou |
| April 30 | Turkey F17 Futures; Antalya, Turkey; Clay $15,000; Singles and doubles draws | (Croatia) Mate Delić; 6–0, 6–4 | (Netherlands) Gijs Brouwer | (Russia) Teymuraz Gabashvili (France) Jules Okala | (Netherlands) Colin van Beem (Peru) Juan Pablo Varillas (France) Tak Khunn Wang (Italy) Riccardo Bonadio |
| April 30 | Turkey F17 Futures; Antalya, Turkey; Clay $15,000; Singles and doubles draws | (Turkey) Cengiz Aksu (Turkey) Mert Naci Türker; 7–6^{(7–5)}, 6–3 | (Netherlands) Gijs Brouwer (Turkey) Ergi Kırkın | (Russia) Teymuraz Gabashvili (France) Jules Okala | (Netherlands) Colin van Beem (Peru) Juan Pablo Varillas (France) Tak Khunn Wang (Italy) Riccardo Bonadio |
| April 30 | Uganda F1 Futures; Kampala, Uganda; Clay $15,000; Singles and doubles draws | (Russia) Ivan Nedelko; 6–4, 6–4 | (United Kingdom) George Loffhagen | (India) Vinayak Sharma Kaza (Serbia) Goran Marković | (India) S D Prajwal Dev (India) Kunal Anand (Italy) Lorenzo Bocchi (Italy) Fabrizio Ornago |
| April 30 | Uganda F1 Futures; Kampala, Uganda; Clay $15,000; Singles and doubles draws | (India) Kunal Anand (Lebanon) Giovani Samaha; 6–3, 2–6, [10–8] | (India) Vinayak Sharma Kaza (Serbia) Goran Marković | (India) Vinayak Sharma Kaza (Serbia) Goran Marković | (India) S D Prajwal Dev (India) Kunal Anand (Italy) Lorenzo Bocchi (Italy) Fabrizio Ornago |
| April 30 | Vietnam F1 Futures; Thừa Thiên-Huế, Vietnam; Hard $15,000; Singles and doubles draws | (Chinese Taipei) Tseng Chun-hsin; 6–3, 7–6^{(7–0)} | (Vietnam) Lý Hoàng Nam | (Australia) Lucas Vuradin (United States) Alexios Halebian | (Japan) Kazuki Nishiwaki (Japan) Takashi Saito (Japan) Jumpei Yamasaki (Australia) Michael Look |
| April 30 | Vietnam F1 Futures; Thừa Thiên-Huế, Vietnam; Hard $15,000; Singles and doubles draws | (Hong Kong) Wong Chun-hun (Hong Kong) Yeung Pak-long; 7–6^{(7–5)}, 6–4 | (Vietnam) Lê Quốc Khánh (Vietnam) Lý Hoàng Nam | (Australia) Lucas Vuradin (United States) Alexios Halebian | (Japan) Kazuki Nishiwaki (Japan) Takashi Saito (Japan) Jumpei Yamasaki (Australia) Michael Look |

=== May ===
| Week of | Tournament | Winner | Runners-up | Semifinalists | Quarterfinalists |
|---|---|---|---|---|---|
| May 7 | China F5 Futures; Wuhan, China; Hard $25,000; Singles and doubles draws | (China) Te Rigele; 7–5, 6–4 | (Finland) Harri Heliövaara | (Japan) Jumpei Yamasaki (Japan) Yuta Shimizu | (Chinese Taipei) Lee Kuan-yi (China) Cui Jie (Japan) Kaito Uesugi (Chinese Taipei) Lo Chien-hsun |
| May 7 | China F5 Futures; Wuhan, China; Hard $25,000; Singles and doubles draws | (Finland) Harri Heliövaara (Finland) Patrik Niklas-Salminen; 6–1, 6–7^{(5–7)}, [10–4] | (Japan) Shintaro Imai (Japan) Yuta Shimizu | (Japan) Jumpei Yamasaki (Japan) Yuta Shimizu | (Chinese Taipei) Lee Kuan-yi (China) Cui Jie (Japan) Kaito Uesugi (Chinese Taipei) Lo Chien-hsun |
| May 7 | Brazil F3 Futures; Brasília, Brazil; Clay $15,000; Singles and doubles draws | (Brazil) Oscar José Gutierrez; 6–2, 6–2 | (Brazil) Marcelo Zormann | (Brazil) Nicolas Santos (Argentina) Tomás Martín Etcheverry | (Sweden) Christian Lindell (Brazil) Pedro Sakamoto (Brazil) Rafael Matos (Brazil) Daniel Dutra da Silva |
| May 7 | Brazil F3 Futures; Brasília, Brazil; Clay $15,000; Singles and doubles draws | (Argentina) Tomás Martín Etcheverry (Brazil) Thiago Seyboth Wild; 6–7^{(1–7)}, 7–6^{(7–3)}, [11–9] | (Brazil) Oscar José Gutierrez (Brazil) Igor Marcondes | (Brazil) Nicolas Santos (Argentina) Tomás Martín Etcheverry | (Sweden) Christian Lindell (Brazil) Pedro Sakamoto (Brazil) Rafael Matos (Brazil) Daniel Dutra da Silva |
| May 7 | Egypt F17 Futures; Cairo, Egypt; Clay $15,000; Singles and doubles draws | (Brazil) Felipe Meligeni Alves; 7–6^{(7–3)}, 7–6^{(7–3)} | (Brazil) Orlando Luz | (Italy) Pietro Licciardi (Russia) Ronald Slobodchikov | (Croatia) Duje Kekez (Russia) Kristian Lozan (Italy) Marco Bortolotti (Croatia) Neven Krivokuća |
| May 7 | Egypt F17 Futures; Cairo, Egypt; Clay $15,000; Singles and doubles draws | (Egypt) Mohamed Abdel-Aziz (Brazil) Orlando Luz; 6–1, 6–4 | (India) Tarun Anirudh Chilakalapudi (India) Vignesh Peranamallur | (Italy) Pietro Licciardi (Russia) Ronald Slobodchikov | (Croatia) Duje Kekez (Russia) Kristian Lozan (Italy) Marco Bortolotti (Croatia) Neven Krivokuća |
| May 7 | Hungary F1 Futures; Zalaegerszeg, Hungary; Clay $15,000; Singles and doubles draws | (Hungary) Máté Valkusz; 6–1, 6–3 | (Slovakia) Filip Horanský | (Romania) Nicolae Frunză (Germany) Marc Sieber | (Czech Republic) Patrik Rikl (Slovakia) Lukáš Klein (Finland) Emil Ruusuvuori (Estonia) Kenneth Raisma |
| May 7 | Hungary F1 Futures; Zalaegerszeg, Hungary; Clay $15,000; Singles and doubles draws | (Estonia) Kenneth Raisma (Finland) Emil Ruusuvuori; 6–4, 6–4 | (Australia) Adam Taylor (Australia) Jason Taylor | (Romania) Nicolae Frunză (Germany) Marc Sieber | (Czech Republic) Patrik Rikl (Slovakia) Lukáš Klein (Finland) Emil Ruusuvuori (Estonia) Kenneth Raisma |
| May 7 | Israel F6 Futures; Sajur, Israel; Hard $15,000; Singles and doubles draws | (United States) Peter Kobelt; 6–2, 4–6, 6–3 | (Argentina) Matías Franco Descotte | (Israel) Edan Leshem (United States) Vasil Kirkov | (Switzerland) Luca Castelnuovo (Israel) Yasha Zemel (Germany) Johannes Härteis (Israel) Alon Elia |
| May 7 | Israel F6 Futures; Sajur, Israel; Hard $15,000; Singles and doubles draws | (Argentina) Matías Franco Descotte (United States) Connor Farren; 6–4, 6–3 | (Israel) Ram Kapach (Israel) Ori Maior | (Israel) Edan Leshem (United States) Vasil Kirkov | (Switzerland) Luca Castelnuovo (Israel) Yasha Zemel (Germany) Johannes Härteis (Israel) Alon Elia |
| May 7 | Mexico F1 Futures; Morelia, Mexico; Hard $15,000; Singles and doubles draws | (Bolivia) Federico Zeballos; 6–3, 6–2 | (Guatemala) Christopher Díaz Figueroa | (Canada) Samuel Monette (Canada) Pavel Krainik | (Peru) Mauricio Echazú (Ecuador) Iván Endara (Guatemala) Wilfredo González (Ecuador) Emilio Gómez |
| May 7 | Mexico F1 Futures; Morelia, Mexico; Hard $15,000; Singles and doubles draws | (Canada) Samuel Monette (United States) Samuel Shropshire; 3–6, 6–2, [10–2] | (Bolivia) Boris Arias (Bolivia) Federico Zeballos | (Canada) Samuel Monette (Canada) Pavel Krainik | (Peru) Mauricio Echazú (Ecuador) Iván Endara (Guatemala) Wilfredo González (Ecuador) Emilio Gómez |
| May 7 | Poland F2 Futures; Wisła, Poland; Clay $15,000; Singles and doubles draws | (Germany) Pascal Meis; 6–2, 3–6, 6–3 | (Latvia) Mārtiņš Podžus | (Belgium) Zizou Bergs (Russia) Maxim Ratniuk | (Czech Republic) Petr Hájek (Germany) Marvin Netuschil (United Kingdom) Jonathan Gray (Poland) Paweł Ciaś |
| May 7 | Poland F2 Futures; Wisła, Poland; Clay $15,000; Singles and doubles draws | (United States) Patrick Daciek (Latvia) Mārtiņš Podžus; 6–4, 4–6, [10–7] | (Russia) Timur Kiyamov (Russia) Maxim Ratniuk | (Belgium) Zizou Bergs (Russia) Maxim Ratniuk | (Czech Republic) Petr Hájek (Germany) Marvin Netuschil (United Kingdom) Jonathan Gray (Poland) Paweł Ciaś |
| May 7 | Sweden F1 Futures; Karlskrona, Sweden; Clay $15,000; Singles and doubles draws | (United States) Alexander Ritschard; 6–2, 2–6, 6–1 | (Slovenia) Mike Urbanija | (Finland) Otto Virtanen (Sweden) Filip Bergevi | (Sweden) Markus Eriksson (Netherlands) Colin van Beem (United States) Nick Chappell (Germany) Louis Wessels |
| May 7 | Sweden F1 Futures; Karlskrona, Sweden; Clay $15,000; Singles and doubles draws | (Sweden) Markus Eriksson (Sweden) Fred Simonsson; 6–1, 1–6, [10–5] | (Finland) Otto Virtanen (Germany) Louis Wessels | (Finland) Otto Virtanen (Sweden) Filip Bergevi | (Sweden) Markus Eriksson (Netherlands) Colin van Beem (United States) Nick Chappell (Germany) Louis Wessels |
| May 7 | Tunisia F18 Futures; Djerba, Tunisia; Hard $15,000; Singles and doubles draws | (France) David Guez; 6–1, 6–1 | (Spain) Andrés Artuñedo | (Tunisia) Moez Echargui (France) Gabriel Petit | (Ecuador) Diego Hidalgo (Spain) José Francisco Vidal Azorín (Spain) Pablo Vivero González (United Kingdom) Aidan McHugh |
| May 7 | Tunisia F18 Futures; Djerba, Tunisia; Hard $15,000; Singles and doubles draws | (Ecuador) Diego Hidalgo (Netherlands) Sem Verbeek; 6–2, 6–4 | (Tunisia) Anis Ghorbel (Bulgaria) Vasko Mladenov | (Tunisia) Moez Echargui (France) Gabriel Petit | (Ecuador) Diego Hidalgo (Spain) José Francisco Vidal Azorín (Spain) Pablo Vivero González (United Kingdom) Aidan McHugh |
| May 7 | Turkey F18 Futures; Antalya, Turkey; Clay $15,000; Singles and doubles draws | (France) Jules Okala; 6–2, 6–2 | (Peru) Juan Pablo Varillas | (Turkey) Marsel İlhan (Croatia) Mate Delić | (Iran) Shahin Khaledan (Russia) Aslan Karatsev (Russia) Alexander Boborykin (Kazakhstan) Denis Yevseyev |
| May 7 | Turkey F18 Futures; Antalya, Turkey; Clay $15,000; Singles and doubles draws | (Russia) Alexander Boborykin (Russia) Aslan Karatsev; 6–4, 6–3 | (Romania) Răzvan Marius Codescu (Romania) Dan Alexandru Tomescu | (Turkey) Marsel İlhan (Croatia) Mate Delić | (Iran) Shahin Khaledan (Russia) Aslan Karatsev (Russia) Alexander Boborykin (Kazakhstan) Denis Yevseyev |
| May 7 | Uganda F2 Futures; Kampala, Uganda; Clay $15,000; Singles and doubles draws | (Italy) Fabrizio Ornago; 7–6^{(8–6)}, 6–3 | (Russia) Ivan Nedelko | (Zimbabwe) Takanyi Garanganga (United Kingdom) George Loffhagen | (India) S D Prajwal Dev (India) Ranjeet Virali-Murugesan (Bosnia and Herzegovina) Darko Bojanović (New Zealand) Ajeet Rai |
| May 7 | Uganda F2 Futures; Kampala, Uganda; Clay $15,000; Singles and doubles draws | (Russia) Anton Chekhov (United States) Matt Seeberger; 6–2, 6–3 | (United States) Tyler Lu (Serbia) Goran Marković | (Zimbabwe) Takanyi Garanganga (United Kingdom) George Loffhagen | (India) S D Prajwal Dev (India) Ranjeet Virali-Murugesan (Bosnia and Herzegovina) Darko Bojanović (New Zealand) Ajeet Rai |
| May 7 | Ukraine F1 Futures; Rivne, Ukraine; Clay $15,000; Singles and doubles draws | (Italy) Alessandro Petrone; 5–7, 6–1, 6–0 | (Italy) Luca Giacomini | (Ukraine) Volodymyr Uzhylovskyi (Ukraine) Artem Smirnov | (Italy) Claudio Fortuna (Ukraine) Vitaliy Sachko (Serbia) Dejan Katić (Brazil) Jordan Correia |
| May 7 | Ukraine F1 Futures; Rivne, Ukraine; Clay $15,000; Singles and doubles draws | (Ukraine) Artem Smirnov (Ukraine) Volodymyr Uzhylovskyi; 6–2, 6–2 | (Ukraine) Vladyslav Orlov (Ukraine) Oleg Prihodko | (Ukraine) Volodymyr Uzhylovskyi (Ukraine) Artem Smirnov | (Italy) Claudio Fortuna (Ukraine) Vitaliy Sachko (Serbia) Dejan Katić (Brazil) Jordan Correia |
| May 7 | Vietnam F2 Futures; Thừa Thiên-Huế, Vietnam; Hard $15,000; Singles and doubles draws | (Japan) Rio Noguchi; 7–6^{(7–5)}, 6–3 | (South Korea) Nam Ji-sung | (Chinese Taipei) Tseng Chun-hsin (Japan) Gengo Kikuchi | (Japan) Takashi Saito (Japan) Kazuki Nishiwaki (Japan) Ryota Tanuma (Canada) Kelsey Stevenson |
| May 7 | Vietnam F2 Futures; Thừa Thiên-Huế, Vietnam; Hard $15,000; Singles and doubles draws | (Vietnam) Lý Hoàng Nam (Vietnam) Nguyễn Văn Phương; 3–6, 6–3, [10–8] | (Hong Kong) Wong Chun-hun (Hong Kong) Yeung Pak-long | (Chinese Taipei) Tseng Chun-hsin (Japan) Gengo Kikuchi | (Japan) Takashi Saito (Japan) Kazuki Nishiwaki (Japan) Ryota Tanuma (Canada) Kelsey Stevenson |
| May 14 | Brazil F4 Futures; Curitiba, Brazil; Clay (indoor) $25,000; Singles and doubles draws | (Brazil) João Lucas Reis da Silva; 6–7^{(1–7)}, 6–3, 6–2 | (Brazil) Thiago Seyboth Wild | (United States) Ulises Blanch (Brazil) José Pereira | (Brazil) Daniel Dutra da Silva (Brazil) Igor Marcondes (Chile) Gonzalo Lama (Brazil) Rafael Matos |
| May 14 | Brazil F4 Futures; Curitiba, Brazil; Clay (indoor) $25,000; Singles and doubles draws | (Brazil) Rafael Matos (Brazil) Marcelo Zormann; 7–6^{(7–2)}, 6–3 | (Brazil) Diego Matos (Brazil) Thales Turini | (United States) Ulises Blanch (Brazil) José Pereira | (Brazil) Daniel Dutra da Silva (Brazil) Igor Marcondes (Chile) Gonzalo Lama (Brazil) Rafael Matos |
| May 14 | China F6 Futures; Lu'an, China; Hard $25,000; Singles and doubles draws | (Finland) Patrik Niklas-Salminen; 2–6, 6–4, 6–4 | (China) Sun Fajing | (Germany) Sami Reinwein (Japan) Kento Takeuchi | (Chinese Taipei) Lee Kuan-yi (Japan) Shintaro Imai (China) Li Chenhe (China) Te Rigele |
| May 14 | China F6 Futures; Lu'an, China; Hard $25,000; Singles and doubles draws | (Finland) Harri Heliövaara (Finland) Patrik Niklas-Salminen; 6–2, 6–3 | (China) Gao Xin (China) Te Rigele | (Germany) Sami Reinwein (Japan) Kento Takeuchi | (Chinese Taipei) Lee Kuan-yi (Japan) Shintaro Imai (China) Li Chenhe (China) Te Rigele |
| May 14 | Argentina F1 Futures; Villa del Dique, Argentina; Clay $15,000; Singles and doubles draws | (Argentina) Facundo Argüello; 3–6, 6–4, 6–4 | (Argentina) Camilo Ugo Carabelli | (Argentina) Santiago Rodríguez Taverna (Peru) Arklon Huertas del Pino | (Argentina) Franco Emanuel Egea (Argentina) Genaro Alberto Olivieri (Argentina) Matías Zukas (Argentina) Tomás Farjat |
| May 14 | Argentina F1 Futures; Villa del Dique, Argentina; Clay $15,000; Singles and doubles draws | (Chile) Juan Carlos Sáez (Argentina) Eduardo Agustín Torre; 6–3, 1–6, [10–7] | (Argentina) Facundo Argüello (Argentina) Matías Zukas | (Argentina) Santiago Rodríguez Taverna (Peru) Arklon Huertas del Pino | (Argentina) Franco Emanuel Egea (Argentina) Genaro Alberto Olivieri (Argentina) Matías Zukas (Argentina) Tomás Farjat |
| May 14 | Bosnia & Herzegovina F1 Futures; Doboj, Bosnia and Herzegovina; Clay $15,000; Singles and doubles draws | (France) Manuel Guinard; 6–3, 6–4 | (Bosnia and Herzegovina) Nerman Fatić | (Bosnia and Herzegovina) Tomislav Brkić (Montenegro) Ljubomir Čelebić | (Argentina) Juan Pablo Paz (Austria) Alexander Erler (North Macedonia) Tomislav Jotovski (Croatia) Mate Delić |
| May 14 | Bosnia & Herzegovina F1 Futures; Doboj, Bosnia and Herzegovina; Clay $15,000; Singles and doubles draws | (Germany) Christian Hirschmüller (Australia) Dane Propoggia; 7–5, 7–5 | (France) Manuel Guinard (France) Luka Pavlovic | (Bosnia and Herzegovina) Tomislav Brkić (Montenegro) Ljubomir Čelebić | (Argentina) Juan Pablo Paz (Austria) Alexander Erler (North Macedonia) Tomislav Jotovski (Croatia) Mate Delić |
| May 14 | Bulgaria F1 Futures; Sozopol, Bulgaria; Hard $15,000; Singles and doubles draws | (France) Sébastien Boltz; 6–3, 6–4 | (Monaco) Lucas Catarina | (Romania) Călin Manda (Italy) Francesco Vilardo | (Bulgaria) Alexandar Lazarov (Bulgaria) Gabriel Donev (Russia) Alexander Igoshin (United States) Vasil Kirkov |
| May 14 | Bulgaria F1 Futures; Sozopol, Bulgaria; Hard $15,000; Singles and doubles draws | (France) Sébastien Boltz (Brazil) Caio Silva; 7–5, 6–3 | (Bulgaria) Alexander Donski (United States) Vasil Kirkov | (Romania) Călin Manda (Italy) Francesco Vilardo | (Bulgaria) Alexandar Lazarov (Bulgaria) Gabriel Donev (Russia) Alexander Igoshin (United States) Vasil Kirkov |
| May 14 | Czech Republic F1 Futures; Prague, Czech Republic; Clay $15,000; Singles and doubles draws | (Germany) Sebastian Fanselow; 7–5, 6–3 | (Germany) Peter Torebko | (Czech Republic) Michal Konečný (Germany) Peter Heller | (Czech Republic) Robin Staněk (Germany) Robert Strombachs (Poland) Maciej Smoła (Czech Republic) Tadeáš Paroulek |
| May 14 | Czech Republic F1 Futures; Prague, Czech Republic; Clay $15,000; Singles and doubles draws | (Germany) Peter Torebko (Belgium) Jeroen Vanneste; 6–4, 6–4 | (Czech Republic) Antonín Bolardt (Czech Republic) Marek Řeháček | (Czech Republic) Michal Konečný (Germany) Peter Heller | (Czech Republic) Robin Staněk (Germany) Robert Strombachs (Poland) Maciej Smoła (Czech Republic) Tadeáš Paroulek |
| May 14 | Hungary F2 Futures; Zalaegerszeg, Hungary; Clay $15,000; Singles and doubles draws | (Hungary) Máté Valkusz; 6–2, 6–1 | (Estonia) Kenneth Raisma | (Russia) Denis Klok (Germany) Marc Sieber | (Hungary) Fábián Marozsán (Netherlands) Mick Veldheer (Romania) Nicolae Frunză (Finland) Emil Ruusuvuori |
| May 14 | Hungary F2 Futures; Zalaegerszeg, Hungary; Clay $15,000; Singles and doubles draws | (Romania) Andrei Ștefan Apostol (Romania) Nicolae Frunză; 7–5, 6–4 | (Hungary) Péter Balla (Hungary) Gergely Madarász | (Russia) Denis Klok (Germany) Marc Sieber | (Hungary) Fábián Marozsán (Netherlands) Mick Veldheer (Romania) Nicolae Frunză (Finland) Emil Ruusuvuori |
| May 14 | Italy F9 Futures; Casale Monferrato, Italy; Clay $15,000; Singles and doubles draws | (Chile) Bastián Malla; 4–6, 6–4, 6–4 | (Italy) Enrico Dalla Valle | (Italy) Riccardo Balzerani (Italy) Giovanni Fonio | (Italy) Corrado Summaria (Italy) Andrea Guerrieri (Italy) Jannik Sinner (France) Antoine Escoffier |
| May 14 | Italy F9 Futures; Casale Monferrato, Italy; Clay $15,000; Singles and doubles draws | (Italy) Lorenzo Frigerio (Italy) Jacopo Stefanini; 7–6^{(7–4)}, 6–3 | (Italy) Giovanni Fonio (Italy) Corrado Summaria | (Italy) Riccardo Balzerani (Italy) Giovanni Fonio | (Italy) Corrado Summaria (Italy) Andrea Guerrieri (Italy) Jannik Sinner (France) Antoine Escoffier |
| May 14 | Mexico F2 Futures; Mexico City, Mexico; Hard $15,000; Singles and doubles draws | (Mexico) Gerardo López Villaseñor; 6–4, 6–2 | (United States) Harrison Adams | (Dominican Republic) José Olivares (United States) Junior Alexander Ore | (United States) Nicholas Shamma (United States) Samuel Shropshire (Bolivia) Federico Zeballos (United States) Adam El Mihdawy |
| May 14 | Mexico F2 Futures; Mexico City, Mexico; Hard $15,000; Singles and doubles draws | (United States) Junior Alexander Ore (Peru) Jorge Panta; 6–3, 6–7^{(1–7)}, [10–6] | (United States) Harrison Adams (United States) Miles Seemann | (Dominican Republic) José Olivares (United States) Junior Alexander Ore | (United States) Nicholas Shamma (United States) Samuel Shropshire (Bolivia) Federico Zeballos (United States) Adam El Mihdawy |
| May 14 | Poland F3 Futures; Ustroń, Poland; Clay $15,000; Singles and doubles draws | (United States) Sekou Bangoura; 4–6, 7–5, 6–4 | (Poland) Paweł Ciaś | (Germany) Marvin Netuschil (Czech Republic) Pavel Nejedlý | (Czech Republic) Marek Jaloviec (Poland) Grzegorz Panfil (Austria) David Pichler (Italy) Dante Gennaro |
| May 14 | Poland F3 Futures; Ustroń, Poland; Clay $15,000; Singles and doubles draws | (United States) Sekou Bangoura (Poland) Szymon Walków; 0–6, 6–1, [10–4] | (Czech Republic) Vít Kopřiva (Czech Republic) David Poljak | (Germany) Marvin Netuschil (Czech Republic) Pavel Nejedlý | (Czech Republic) Marek Jaloviec (Poland) Grzegorz Panfil (Austria) David Pichler (Italy) Dante Gennaro |
| May 14 | Singapore F1 Futures; Singapore; Hard $15,000; Singles and doubles draws | (United States) Thai-Son Kwiatkowski; 6–2, 6–2 | (Japan) Soichiro Moritani | (United States) Nicholas Hu (United States) Mousheg Hovhannisyan | (Australia) Daniel Nolan (United States) Connor Farren (Australia) Moerani Bouzige (Japan) Kaito Uesugi |
| May 14 | Singapore F1 Futures; Singapore; Hard $15,000; Singles and doubles draws | (United States) Nicholas Hu (France) Clément Larrière; 6–1, 5–7, [10–6] | (Hong Kong) Wong Chun-hun (Hong Kong) Yeung Pak-long | (United States) Nicholas Hu (United States) Mousheg Hovhannisyan | (Australia) Daniel Nolan (United States) Connor Farren (Australia) Moerani Bouzige (Japan) Kaito Uesugi |
| May 14 | Spain F11 Futures; Valldoreix, Spain; Clay $15,000; Singles and doubles draws | (Spain) Oriol Roca Batalla; 7–6^{(7–5)}, 6–2 | (Belgium) Omar Salman | (Spain) Sergio Gutiérrez Ferrol (Italy) Raúl Brancaccio | (United States) Sebastian Korda (Spain) Pol Toledo Bagué (Spain) Jordi Samper Montaña (Spain) Javier Barranco Cosano |
| May 14 | Spain F11 Futures; Valldoreix, Spain; Clay $15,000; Singles and doubles draws | (United States) Sebastian Korda (Brazil) Orlando Luz; 3–6, 6–2, [10–7] | (Netherlands) Michiel de Krom (Brazil) Felipe Meligeni Alves | (Spain) Sergio Gutiérrez Ferrol (Italy) Raúl Brancaccio | (United States) Sebastian Korda (Spain) Pol Toledo Bagué (Spain) Jordi Samper Montaña (Spain) Javier Barranco Cosano |
| May 14 | Sweden F2 Futures; Kalmar, Sweden; Clay $15,000; Singles and doubles draws | (United States) Alexander Ritschard; 6–4, 6–3 | (Germany) Frederik Press | (Italy) Fabrizio Ornago (Sweden) Fred Simonsson | (Netherlands) Colin van Beem (France) Gabriel Petit (Romania) George Botezan (Germany) Lukas Ollert |
| May 14 | Sweden F2 Futures; Kalmar, Sweden; Clay $15,000; Singles and doubles draws | (Netherlands) Glenn Smits (Netherlands) Colin van Beem; 6–3, 6–4 | (Sweden) Markus Eriksson (Sweden) Fred Simonsson | (Italy) Fabrizio Ornago (Sweden) Fred Simonsson | (Netherlands) Colin van Beem (France) Gabriel Petit (Romania) George Botezan (Germany) Lukas Ollert |
| May 14 | Tunisia F19 Futures; Djerba, Tunisia; Hard $15,000; Singles and doubles draws | (Tunisia) Moez Echargui; 6–0, 6–1 | (Spain) Pablo Vivero González | (Tunisia) Anis Ghorbel (Spain) José Francisco Vidal Azorín | (France) Hugo Voljacques (Argentina) Ignacio Carou (United States) Hady Habib (Bulgaria) Vasko Mladenov |
| May 14 | Tunisia F19 Futures; Djerba, Tunisia; Hard $15,000; Singles and doubles draws | (Tunisia) Anis Ghorbel (Bulgaria) Vasko Mladenov; 4–6, 7–6^{(9–7)}, [12–10] | (United States) Hady Habib (Spain) José Francisco Vidal Azorín | (Tunisia) Anis Ghorbel (Spain) José Francisco Vidal Azorín | (France) Hugo Voljacques (Argentina) Ignacio Carou (United States) Hady Habib (Bulgaria) Vasko Mladenov |
| May 14 | Turkey F19 Futures; Antalya, Turkey; Clay $15,000; Singles and doubles draws | (Turkey) Marsel İlhan; 6–4, 6–4 | (Romania) Bogdan Borza | (Russia) Alexander Boborykin (France) Alexis Musialek | (Austria) Philipp Schroll (Argentina) Tomás Lipovšek Puches (Russia) Aslan Karatsev (Peru) Juan Pablo Varillas |
| May 14 | Turkey F19 Futures; Antalya, Turkey; Clay $15,000; Singles and doubles draws | (Russia) Alexander Boborykin (Russia) Ivan Davydov; 6–4, 6–2 | (Argentina) Tomás Lipovšek Puches (Italy) Antonio Massara | (Russia) Alexander Boborykin (France) Alexis Musialek | (Austria) Philipp Schroll (Argentina) Tomás Lipovšek Puches (Russia) Aslan Karatsev (Peru) Juan Pablo Varillas |
| May 14 | Uganda F3 Futures; Kampala, Uganda; Clay $15,000; Singles and doubles draws | (Russia) Ivan Nedelko; 6–0, 6–3 | (Spain) David Pérez Sanz | (United States) Tyler Lu (Zimbabwe) Takanyi Garanganga | (Burundi) Hassan Ndayishimiye (Russia) Shalva Dzhanashiya (India) Dhruv Sunish (Serbia) Goran Marković |
| May 14 | Uganda F3 Futures; Kampala, Uganda; Clay $15,000; Singles and doubles draws | (United States) Tyler Lu (Serbia) Goran Marković; 7–6^{(7–4)}, 6–4 | (Venezuela) Jordi Muñoz Abreu (Spain) David Pérez Sanz | (United States) Tyler Lu (Zimbabwe) Takanyi Garanganga | (Burundi) Hassan Ndayishimiye (Russia) Shalva Dzhanashiya (India) Dhruv Sunish (Serbia) Goran Marković |
| May 14 | Ukraine F2 Futures; Rivne, Ukraine; Clay $15,000; Singles and doubles draws | (Belgium) Jonas Merckx; 6–4, 6–2 | (Ukraine) Oleg Dolgosheyev | (Ukraine) Oleg Prihodko (Ukraine) Olexiy Kolisnyk | (Italy) Alessandro Petrone (Ukraine) Volodymyr Uzhylovskyi (Italy) Claudio Fortuna (Ukraine) Roman Boychuk |
| May 14 | Ukraine F2 Futures; Rivne, Ukraine; Clay $15,000; Singles and doubles draws | (Ukraine) Artem Smirnov (Ukraine) Volodymyr Uzhylovskyi; 4–6, 7–6^{(7–5)}, [10–4] | (Ukraine) Oleg Dolgosheyev (Ukraine) Dmytro Kamynin | (Ukraine) Oleg Prihodko (Ukraine) Olexiy Kolisnyk | (Italy) Alessandro Petrone (Ukraine) Volodymyr Uzhylovskyi (Italy) Claudio Fortuna (Ukraine) Roman Boychuk |
| May 14 | Vietnam F3 Futures; Thừa Thiên-Huế, Vietnam; Hard $15,000; Singles and doubles draws | (South Korea) Nam Ji-sung; 6–4, 6–2 | (Thailand) Pruchya Isaro | (South Korea) Son Ji-hoon (Chinese Taipei) Yu Cheng-yu | (Japan) Takashi Saito (India) Abhinav Sanjeev Shanmugam (United States) Alexios Halebian (Vietnam) Trịnh Linh Giang |
| May 14 | Vietnam F3 Futures; Thừa Thiên-Huế, Vietnam; Hard $15,000; Singles and doubles draws | (South Korea) Nam Ji-sung (South Korea) Song Min-kyu; 6–1, 6–4 | (Thailand) Kittirat Kerdlaphee (Thailand) Palaphoom Kovapitukted | (South Korea) Son Ji-hoon (Chinese Taipei) Yu Cheng-yu | (Japan) Takashi Saito (India) Abhinav Sanjeev Shanmugam (United States) Alexios Halebian (Vietnam) Trịnh Linh Giang |
| May 21 | Italy F11 Futures; Naples, Italy; Clay $25,000; Singles and doubles draws | (Italy) Raúl Brancaccio; 6–2, 6–7^{(3–7)}, 6–0 | (Italy) Pietro Rondoni | (Bulgaria) Alexandar Lazov (Italy) Corrado Summaria | (France) Maxime Tabatruong (Austria) Lenny Hampel (Portugal) Fred Gil (Russia) Alen Avidzba |
| May 21 | Italy F11 Futures; Naples, Italy; Clay $25,000; Singles and doubles draws | (Argentina) Franco Agamenone (Argentina) Patricio Heras; 6–3, 6–4 | (United States) Ulises Blanch (Argentina) Franco Capalbo | (Bulgaria) Alexandar Lazov (Italy) Corrado Summaria | (France) Maxime Tabatruong (Austria) Lenny Hampel (Portugal) Fred Gil (Russia) Alen Avidzba |
| May 21 | Argentina F2 Futures; Villa María, Argentina; Clay $15,000; Singles and doubles draws | (Argentina) Camilo Ugo Carabelli; 7–6^{(7–5)}, 6–3 | (Chile) Juan Carlos Sáez | (Argentina) Gonzalo Villanueva (Brazil) Oscar José Gutierrez | (Argentina) Facundo Argüello (Argentina) Genaro Alberto Olivieri (Argentina) Matías Zukas (Argentina) Eduardo Agustín Torre |
| May 21 | Argentina F2 Futures; Villa María, Argentina; Clay $15,000; Singles and doubles draws | (Argentina) Facundo Argüello (Argentina) Matías Zukas; 6–2, 6–2 | (Chile) Juan Carlos Sáez (Argentina) Eduardo Agustín Torre | (Argentina) Gonzalo Villanueva (Brazil) Oscar José Gutierrez | (Argentina) Facundo Argüello (Argentina) Genaro Alberto Olivieri (Argentina) Matías Zukas (Argentina) Eduardo Agustín Torre |
| May 21 | Bosnia & Herzegovina F2 Futures; Brčko, Bosnia and Herzegovina; Clay $15,000; Singles and doubles draws | (Germany) Elmar Ejupovic; 7–6^{(7–1)}, 6–1 | (Argentina) Juan Pablo Paz | (United Kingdom) Samm Butler (Bosnia and Herzegovina) Nerman Fatić | (Croatia) Fran Zvonimir Zgombić (Slovenia) Tom Kočevar-Dešman (Italy) Luca Prevosto (Greece) Ioannis Stergiou |
| May 21 | Bosnia & Herzegovina F2 Futures; Brčko, Bosnia and Herzegovina; Clay $15,000; Singles and doubles draws | (Montenegro) Ljubomir Čelebić (Bosnia and Herzegovina) Nerman Fatić; 2–6, 6–4, [10–7] | (Croatia) Duje Kekez (Croatia) Antun Vidak | (United Kingdom) Samm Butler (Bosnia and Herzegovina) Nerman Fatić | (Croatia) Fran Zvonimir Zgombić (Slovenia) Tom Kočevar-Dešman (Italy) Luca Prevosto (Greece) Ioannis Stergiou |
| May 21 | Czech Republic F2 Futures; Jablonec nad Nisou, Czech Republic; Clay $15,000; Singles and doubles draws | (United States) Sekou Bangoura; 6–4, 6–3 | (Germany) Peter Heller | (Brazil) Bruno Sant'Anna (Czech Republic) Jan Mertl | (Russia) Philipp Davydenko (Czech Republic) Tomáš Macháč (Czech Republic) Michal Konečný (Czech Republic) Patrik Rikl |
| May 21 | Czech Republic F2 Futures; Jablonec nad Nisou, Czech Republic; Clay $15,000; Singles and doubles draws | (Czech Republic) Filip Duda (Czech Republic) Michael Vrbenský; 6–3, 4–6, [10–5] | (Czech Republic) Petr Nouza (Czech Republic) Patrik Rikl | (Brazil) Bruno Sant'Anna (Czech Republic) Jan Mertl | (Russia) Philipp Davydenko (Czech Republic) Tomáš Macháč (Czech Republic) Michal Konečný (Czech Republic) Patrik Rikl |
| May 21 | Hungary F3 Futures; Balatonalmádi, Hungary; Clay $15,000; Singles and doubles draws | (Serbia) Marko Tepavac; 6–4, 6–1 | (France) Samuel Bensoussan | (Germany) Pascal Meis (France) Mick Lescure | (Hungary) Dávid Szintai (Russia) Bogdan Bobrov (Slovakia) Tomáš Líška (Russia) Denis Klok |
| May 21 | Hungary F3 Futures; Balatonalmádi, Hungary; Clay $15,000; Singles and doubles draws | (United Kingdom) Toby Martin (Croatia) Alen Rogić Hadžalić; 6–3, 6–2 | (United States) Victor Gurevich (United States) Maksim Tikhomirov | (Germany) Pascal Meis (France) Mick Lescure | (Hungary) Dávid Szintai (Russia) Bogdan Bobrov (Slovakia) Tomáš Líška (Russia) Denis Klok |
| May 21 | Mexico F3 Futures; Córdoba, Mexico; Hard $15,000; Singles and doubles draws | (United States) Adam El Mihdawy; 3–6, 6–4, 7–5 | (Guatemala) Christopher Díaz Figueroa | (Canada) Pavel Krainik (Colombia) Alejandro Gómez | (Dominican Republic) José Olivares (Mexico) Lucas Gómez (Guatemala) Wilfredo González (United States) Brian Shi |
| May 21 | Mexico F3 Futures; Córdoba, Mexico; Hard $15,000; Singles and doubles draws | (United States) Hunter Johnson (United States) Yates Johnson; 6–3, 6–3 | (Australia) Edward Bourchier (Peru) Alexander Merino | (Canada) Pavel Krainik (Colombia) Alejandro Gómez | (Dominican Republic) José Olivares (Mexico) Lucas Gómez (Guatemala) Wilfredo González (United States) Brian Shi |
| May 21 | Poland F4 Futures; Ustroń, Poland; Clay $15,000; Singles and doubles draws | (Czech Republic) Vít Kopřiva; 7–5, 6–1 | (Italy) Dante Gennaro | (Poland) Paweł Ciaś (Poland) Maciej Rajski | (Belgium) Omar Salman (Netherlands) Guy den Heijer (Czech Republic) Pavel Nejedlý (Austria) David Pichler |
| May 21 | Poland F4 Futures; Ustroń, Poland; Clay $15,000; Singles and doubles draws | (Poland) Paweł Ciaś (Poland) Grzegorz Panfil; 6–4, 6–4 | (Switzerland) Luca Castelnuovo (Belarus) Mikalai Haliak | (Poland) Paweł Ciaś (Poland) Maciej Rajski | (Belgium) Omar Salman (Netherlands) Guy den Heijer (Czech Republic) Pavel Nejedlý (Austria) David Pichler |
| May 21 | Romania F1 Futures; Bucharest, Romania; Clay $15,000; Singles and doubles draws | (Romania) Dragoș Dima; 6–2, 6–4 | (Romania) Nicolae Frunză | (Romania) Vasile Antonescu (Romania) Vladislav Melnic | (Bulgaria) Alexandar Lazarov (Austria) Matthias Haim (Romania) Teodor-Dacian Crăciun (France) Thomas Setodji |
| May 21 | Romania F1 Futures; Bucharest, Romania; Clay $15,000; Singles and doubles draws | (Romania) Vasile Antonescu (Romania) Patrick Grigoriu; 6–1, 6–4 | (Romania) Victor Vlad Cornea (Romania) Victor Crivoi | (Romania) Vasile Antonescu (Romania) Vladislav Melnic | (Bulgaria) Alexandar Lazarov (Austria) Matthias Haim (Romania) Teodor-Dacian Crăciun (France) Thomas Setodji |
| May 21 | Singapore F2 Futures; Singapore; Hard $15,000; Singles and doubles draws | (United States) Collin Altamirano; 7–6^{(7–5)}, 6–3 | (Japan) Takuto Niki | (United States) Thai-Son Kwiatkowski (Japan) Kazuki Nishiwaki | (Japan) Kaito Uesugi (Australia) Daniel Nolan (Japan) Makoto Ochi (Japan) Shintaro Imai |
| May 21 | Singapore F2 Futures; Singapore; Hard $15,000; Singles and doubles draws | (Philippines) Francis Alcantara (United States) Collin Altamirano; 6–1, 6–4 | (Japan) Shintaro Imai (Japan) Takuto Niki | (United States) Thai-Son Kwiatkowski (Japan) Kazuki Nishiwaki | (Japan) Kaito Uesugi (Australia) Daniel Nolan (Japan) Makoto Ochi (Japan) Shintaro Imai |
| May 21 | Spain F12 Futures; Vic, Spain; Clay $15,000; Singles and doubles draws | (Brazil) Orlando Luz; 7–6^{(8–6)}, 4–2, ret. | (Spain) Oriol Roca Batalla | (Spain) Sergio Martos Gornés (Brazil) Felipe Meligeni Alves | (Ecuador) Diego Hidalgo (Spain) Marc Fornell Mestres (Russia) Alexander Zhurbin (Spain) Jaume Pla Malfeito |
| May 21 | Spain F12 Futures; Vic, Spain; Clay $15,000; Singles and doubles draws | (Spain) Sergio Martos Gornés (Spain) Adria Mas Mascolo; 7–6^{(7–5)}, 6–4 | (Spain) Sergio Barranco (Spain) Oriol Roca Batalla | (Spain) Sergio Martos Gornés (Brazil) Felipe Meligeni Alves | (Ecuador) Diego Hidalgo (Spain) Marc Fornell Mestres (Russia) Alexander Zhurbin (Spain) Jaume Pla Malfeito |
| May 21 | Sweden F3 Futures; Lund, Sweden; Clay $15,000; Singles and doubles draws | (United States) Alexander Ritschard; 6–3, 6–3 | (France) Manuel Guinard | (Germany) Frederik Press (Netherlands) Colin van Beem | (Sweden) Karl Friberg (Italy) Fabrizio Ornago (Germany) Louis Wessels (France) Baptise Crepatte |
| May 21 | Sweden F3 Futures; Lund, Sweden; Clay $15,000; Singles and doubles draws | (Netherlands) Marc Dijkhuizen (Austria) Peter Goldsteiner; 6–4, 6–2 | (Poland) Bartosz Terczyński (Poland) Mateusz Terczyński | (Germany) Frederik Press (Netherlands) Colin van Beem | (Sweden) Karl Friberg (Italy) Fabrizio Ornago (Germany) Louis Wessels (France) Baptise Crepatte |
| May 21 | Tunisia F20 Futures; Djerba, Tunisia; Hard $15,000; Singles and doubles draws | (United States) Hady Habib; 7–6^{(8–6)}, 6–4 | (Tunisia) Moez Echargui | (Germany) Stefan Seifert (Italy) Francesco Vilardo | (Tunisia) Aziz Dougaz (United States) Alexandre Rotsaert (Turkey) Ergi Kırkın (Turkey) Sarp Ağabigün |
| May 21 | Tunisia F20 Futures; Djerba, Tunisia; Hard $15,000; Singles and doubles draws | (Tunisia) Anis Ghorbel (Bulgaria) Vasko Mladenov; 6–3, 4–6, [10–7] | (Benin) Alexis Klégou (Italy) Francesco Vilardo | (Germany) Stefan Seifert (Italy) Francesco Vilardo | (Tunisia) Aziz Dougaz (United States) Alexandre Rotsaert (Turkey) Ergi Kırkın (Turkey) Sarp Ağabigün |
| May 21 | Turkey F20 Futures; Antalya, Turkey; Clay $15,000; Singles and doubles draws | (Kazakhstan) Denis Yevseyev; 6–1, 6–0 | (Switzerland) Vullnet Tashi | (Argentina) Nicolás Alberto Arreche (Germany) Paul Wörner | (France) Pierre Faivre (Germany) Flemming Peters (Germany) Mats Rosenkranz (Turkey) Cengiz Aksu |
| May 21 | Turkey F20 Futures; Antalya, Turkey; Clay $15,000; Singles and doubles draws | (Germany) Valentin Günther (Germany) Mats Rosenkranz; 6–1, 6–2 | (France) Florent Diep (France) François-Arthur Vibert | (Argentina) Nicolás Alberto Arreche (Germany) Paul Wörner | (France) Pierre Faivre (Germany) Flemming Peters (Germany) Mats Rosenkranz (Turkey) Cengiz Aksu |
| May 21 | Uganda F4 Futures; Kampala, Uganda; Clay $15,000; Singles and doubles draws | (Russia) Ivan Nedelko; 6–4, 6–4 | (United States) Tyler Lu | (Serbia) Goran Marković (Spain) David Pérez Sanz | (Italy) Marco Miceli (South Africa) Lance-Pierre du Toit (India) Kunal Anand (India) S D Prajwal Dev |
| May 21 | Uganda F4 Futures; Kampala, Uganda; Clay $15,000; Singles and doubles draws | (Russia) Anton Chekhov (Uganda) Duncan Mugabe; 6–2, 6–3 | (Kenya) Ismael Changawa Ruwa Mzai (Kenya) Ibrahim Kibet Yego | (Serbia) Goran Marković (Spain) David Pérez Sanz | (Italy) Marco Miceli (South Africa) Lance-Pierre du Toit (India) Kunal Anand (India) S D Prajwal Dev |
| May 21 | Ukraine F3 Futures; Rivne, Ukraine; Clay $15,000; Singles and doubles draws | (Brazil) Jordan Correia; 6–3, 6–4 | (Ukraine) Olexiy Kolisnyk | (Uzbekistan) Jurabek Karimov (Ukraine) Oleksii Krutykh | (Ukraine) Oleg Dolgosheyev (Russia) Yan Bondarevskiy (Ukraine) Dmytro Kamynin (Belgium) Jonas Merckx |
| May 21 | Ukraine F3 Futures; Rivne, Ukraine; Clay $15,000; Singles and doubles draws | (Ukraine) Artem Smirnov (Ukraine) Volodymyr Uzhylovskyi; 7–5, 6–1 | (Ukraine) Vladyslav Orlov (Ukraine) Oleg Prihodko | (Uzbekistan) Jurabek Karimov (Ukraine) Oleksii Krutykh | (Ukraine) Oleg Dolgosheyev (Russia) Yan Bondarevskiy (Ukraine) Dmytro Kamynin (Belgium) Jonas Merckx |
| May 28 | China F7 Futures; Luzhou, China; Hard $25,000; Singles and doubles draws | (China) Li Zhe; 2–6, 6–2, 6–2 | (China) Wu Di | (China) He Yecong (China) Gao Xin | (Thailand) Wishaya Trongcharoenchaikul (Japan) Kento Takeuchi (South Korea) Chung Yun-seong (China) Bai Yan |
| May 28 | China F7 Futures; Luzhou, China; Hard $25,000; Singles and doubles draws | (New Zealand) Rhett Purcell (Germany) Sami Reinwein; 7–5, 6–3 | (Philippines) Francis Alcantara (China) Sun Fajing | (China) He Yecong (China) Gao Xin | (Thailand) Wishaya Trongcharoenchaikul (Japan) Kento Takeuchi (South Korea) Chung Yun-seong (China) Bai Yan |
| May 28 | Romania F2 Futures; Bacău, Romania; Clay $25,000+H; Singles and doubles draws | (France) Jules Okala; 6–1, 6–1 | (Romania) Bogdan Ionuț Apostol | (Argentina) Hernán Casanova (Ecuador) Gonzalo Escobar | (Romania) Dragoș Dima (Romania) Vasile-Alexandru Ghilea (Romania) Filip Cristian Jianu (Brazil) Orlando Luz |
| May 28 | Romania F2 Futures; Bacău, Romania; Clay $25,000+H; Singles and doubles draws | (Argentina) Franco Agamenone (Argentina) Hernán Casanova; 6–2, 6–3 | (Hungary) Gábor Borsos (Ecuador) Gonzalo Escobar | (Argentina) Hernán Casanova (Ecuador) Gonzalo Escobar | (Romania) Dragoș Dima (Romania) Vasile-Alexandru Ghilea (Romania) Filip Cristian Jianu (Brazil) Orlando Luz |
| May 28 | Uzbekistan F3 Futures; Andijan, Uzbekistan; Hard $25,000; Singles and doubles draws | (Uzbekistan) Sanjar Fayziev; 7–6^{(9–7)}, 6–4 | (Turkey) Cem İlkel | (Ukraine) Vladyslav Manafov (Belarus) Sergey Betov | (Russia) Konstantin Kravchuk (Russia) Kristian Lozan (Russia) Roman Safiullin (Russia) Mikhail Fufygin |
| May 28 | Uzbekistan F3 Futures; Andijan, Uzbekistan; Hard $25,000; Singles and doubles draws | (Belarus) Sergey Betov (Belarus) Yaraslav Shyla; 6–4, 7–6^{(7–2)} | (Russia) Konstantin Kravchuk (Russia) Roman Safiullin | (Ukraine) Vladyslav Manafov (Belarus) Sergey Betov | (Russia) Konstantin Kravchuk (Russia) Kristian Lozan (Russia) Roman Safiullin (Russia) Mikhail Fufygin |
| May 28 | Argentina F3 Futures; Córdoba, Argentina; Clay $15,000; Singles and doubles draws | (Argentina) Facundo Argüello; 6–4, 7–6^{(7–5)} | (Argentina) Gonzalo Villanueva | (Argentina) Santiago Rodríguez Taverna (Argentina) Franco Emanuel Egea | (Argentina) Camilo Ugo Carabelli (Argentina) Genaro Alberto Olivieri (Chile) Juan Carlos Sáez (Argentina) Tomás Martín Etcheverry |
| May 28 | Argentina F3 Futures; Córdoba, Argentina; Clay $15,000; Singles and doubles draws | (Argentina) Gabriel Alejandro Hidalgo (Argentina) Federico Moreno; 6–3, 6–2 | (Brazil) Oscar José Gutierrez (Argentina) Camilo Ugo Carabelli | (Argentina) Santiago Rodríguez Taverna (Argentina) Franco Emanuel Egea | (Argentina) Camilo Ugo Carabelli (Argentina) Genaro Alberto Olivieri (Chile) Juan Carlos Sáez (Argentina) Tomás Martín Etcheverry |
| May 28 | Bosnia & Herzegovina F3 Futures; Kiseljak, Bosnia and Herzegovina; Clay $15,000; Singles and doubles draws | (Slovenia) Tom Kočevar-Dešman; 7–6^{(7–3)}, 6–3 | (Germany) Elmar Ejupovic | (Sweden) Gustav Hansson (North Macedonia) Tomislav Jotovski | (Slovenia) Nik Razboršek (Austria) David Pichler (Hungary) Péter Nagy (Croatia) Duje Kekez |
| May 28 | Bosnia & Herzegovina F3 Futures; Kiseljak, Bosnia and Herzegovina; Clay $15,000; Singles and doubles draws | (Australia) Dane Propoggia (Australia) Scott Puodziunas; 2–6, 7–6^{(7–5)}, [10–4] | (Slovenia) Tom Kočevar-Dešman (Slovenia) Nik Razboršek | (Sweden) Gustav Hansson (North Macedonia) Tomislav Jotovski | (Slovenia) Nik Razboršek (Austria) David Pichler (Hungary) Péter Nagy (Croatia) Duje Kekez |
| May 28 | Czech Republic F3 Futures; Most, Czech Republic; Clay $15,000; Singles and doubles draws | (Czech Republic) Patrik Rikl; 6–2, 3–6, 6–2 | (Brazil) Bruno Sant'Anna | (Czech Republic) Marek Jaloviec (Czech Republic) Jan Mertl | (Czech Republic) Tadeáš Paroulek (Russia) Philipp Davydenko (United States) Sekou Bangoura (Czech Republic) Pavel Nejedlý |
| May 28 | Czech Republic F3 Futures; Most, Czech Republic; Clay $15,000; Singles and doubles draws | (Czech Republic) Petr Michnev (Czech Republic) Patrik Rikl; 6–2, 2–6, [10–7] | (Czech Republic) Tomáš Macháč (Czech Republic) Michael Vrbenský | (Czech Republic) Marek Jaloviec (Czech Republic) Jan Mertl | (Czech Republic) Tadeáš Paroulek (Russia) Philipp Davydenko (United States) Sekou Bangoura (Czech Republic) Pavel Nejedlý |
| May 28 | Italy F12 Futures; Reggio Emilia, Italy; Clay $15,000+H; Singles and doubles draws | (Italy) Jacopo Berrettini; 0–6, 6–1, 7–5 | (Italy) Marco Bortolotti | (France) Maxime Tabatruong (Italy) Andrea Guerrieri | (Italy) Francesco Forti (Italy) Pietro Rondoni (Spain) Eduard Esteve Lobato (Italy) Roberto Marcora |
| May 28 | Italy F12 Futures; Reggio Emilia, Italy; Clay $15,000+H; Singles and doubles draws | (Turkey) Tuna Altuna (Bulgaria) Alexandar Lazov; 6–4, 6–2 | (Belgium) Zizou Bergs (France) Maxime Tabatruong | (France) Maxime Tabatruong (Italy) Andrea Guerrieri | (Italy) Francesco Forti (Italy) Pietro Rondoni (Spain) Eduard Esteve Lobato (Italy) Roberto Marcora |
| May 28 | Singapore F3 Futures; Singapore; Hard $15,000; Singles and doubles draws | (Australia) Maverick Banes; 6–4, 7–5 | (United States) Nicholas Hu | (Australia) Daniel Nolan (Chinese Taipei) Hsu Yu-hsiou | (Australia) Jacob Grills (United States) Alec Adamson (Japan) Makoto Ochi (Japan) Yuta Shimizu |
| May 28 | Singapore F3 Futures; Singapore; Hard $15,000; Singles and doubles draws | (Australia) Jeremy Beale (Australia) James Frawley; 6–2, 6–3 | (Chinese Taipei) Hsu Yu-hsiou (Japan) Yuta Shimizu | (Australia) Daniel Nolan (Chinese Taipei) Hsu Yu-hsiou | (Australia) Jacob Grills (United States) Alec Adamson (Japan) Makoto Ochi (Japan) Yuta Shimizu |
| May 28 | Spain F13 Futures; Santa Margarida de Montbui, Spain; Hard $15,000; Singles and doubles draws | (Finland) Emil Ruusuvuori; 6–3, 6–3 | (Russia) Alexander Zhurbin | (Spain) David Pérez Sanz (India) Adil Kalyanpur | (Spain) Ignasi de Rueda de Genover (Spain) Pablo Vivero González (Spain) Enrique Luque Rico (Spain) Andrés Artuñedo |
| May 28 | Spain F13 Futures; Santa Margarida de Montbui, Spain; Hard $15,000; Singles and doubles draws | (United Kingdom) Evan Hoyt (Finland) Patrik Niklas-Salminen; 6–2, 6–7^{(7–9)}, [10–5] | (Venezuela) Jordi Muñoz Abreu (Spain) David Pérez Sanz | (Spain) David Pérez Sanz (India) Adil Kalyanpur | (Spain) Ignasi de Rueda de Genover (Spain) Pablo Vivero González (Spain) Enrique Luque Rico (Spain) Andrés Artuñedo |
| May 28 | Tunisia F21 Futures; Djerba, Tunisia; Hard $15,000; Singles and doubles draws | (Tunisia) Moez Echargui; 6–4, 6–3 | (United States) Vasil Kirkov | (Monaco) Lucas Catarina (France) Gabriel Petit | (United States) Hady Habib (Australia) Nicholas Horton (Germany) Stefan Seifert (Romania) Călin Manda |
| May 28 | Tunisia F21 Futures; Djerba, Tunisia; Hard $15,000; Singles and doubles draws | (Tunisia) Anis Ghorbel (Bulgaria) Vasko Mladenov; 6–3, 6–2 | (United States) John Paul Fruttero (France) Albano Olivetti | (Monaco) Lucas Catarina (France) Gabriel Petit | (United States) Hady Habib (Australia) Nicholas Horton (Germany) Stefan Seifert (Romania) Călin Manda |
| May 28 | Turkey F21 Futures; Antalya, Turkey; Clay $15,000; Singles and doubles draws | (Germany) Peter Heller; 2–6, 6–2, 6–3 | (Turkey) Marsel İlhan | (Belgium) Christopher Heyman (France) Florent Diep | (Italy) Georg Winkler (Russia) Dimitriy Voronin (Italy) Pietro Licciardi (Turkey) Koray Kırcı |
| May 28 | Turkey F21 Futures; Antalya, Turkey; Clay $15,000; Singles and doubles draws | (Germany) Peter Heller (Mexico) Luis Patiño; 6–3, 6–3 | (Turkey) Can Kaya (United States) Paul Oosterbaan | (Belgium) Christopher Heyman (France) Florent Diep | (Italy) Georg Winkler (Russia) Dimitriy Voronin (Italy) Pietro Licciardi (Turkey) Koray Kırcı |
| May 28 | Zimbabwe F1 Futures; Harare, Zimbabwe; Hard $15,000; Singles and doubles draws | (Zimbabwe) Benjamin Lock; 7–6^{(9–7)}, 6–2 | (Zimbabwe) Takanyi Garanganga | (South Africa) Joshua Howard-Tripp (Zimbabwe) Mehluli Don Ayanda Sibanda | (Switzerland) Aaron Schmid (Namibia) Tukhula Jacobs (Spain) Jorge Blanco Guadalupe (United Kingdom) Isaac Stoute |
| May 28 | Zimbabwe F1 Futures; Harare, Zimbabwe; Hard $15,000; Singles and doubles draws | (Zimbabwe) Benjamin Lock (Zimbabwe) Courtney John Lock; 6–3, 6–0 | (India) Anirudh Chandrasekar (India) Vignesh Peranamallur | (South Africa) Joshua Howard-Tripp (Zimbabwe) Mehluli Don Ayanda Sibanda | (Switzerland) Aaron Schmid (Namibia) Tukhula Jacobs (Spain) Jorge Blanco Guadalupe (United Kingdom) Isaac Stoute |

=== June ===
| Week of | Tournament | Winner | Runners-up | Semifinalists | Quarterfinalists |
|---|---|---|---|---|---|
| June 4 | China F8 Futures; Yinchuan, China; Hard $25,000; Singles and doubles draws | (China) Li Zhe; 6–3, 6–3 | (Thailand) Wishaya Trongcharoenchaikul | (China) Wu Di (Japan) Hiroyasu Ehara | (Philippines) Francis Alcantara (United States) Alafia Ayeni (Japan) Sho Katayama (China) Sun Fajing |
| June 4 | China F8 Futures; Yinchuan, China; Hard $25,000; Singles and doubles draws | (Philippines) Francis Alcantara (China) Sun Fajing; 6–4, 2–6, [10–5] | (Japan) Kento Takeuchi (Thailand) Wishaya Trongcharoenchaikul | (China) Wu Di (Japan) Hiroyasu Ehara | (Philippines) Francis Alcantara (United States) Alafia Ayeni (Japan) Sho Katayama (China) Sun Fajing |
| June 4 | Israel F8 Futures; Tel Aviv, Israel; Hard $25,000; Singles and doubles draws | (France) Yannick Jankovits; 6–3, 6–2 | (United States) Peter Kobelt | (France) Ugo Humbert (Israel) Edan Leshem | (Turkey) Altuğ Çelikbilek (France) Albano Olivetti (Israel) Ben Patael (Italy) Alessandro Bega |
| June 4 | Israel F8 Futures; Tel Aviv, Israel; Hard $25,000; Singles and doubles draws | (Israel) Daniel Cukierman (Israel) Edan Leshem; 6–4, 6–2 | (France) Dan Added (France) Albano Olivetti | (France) Ugo Humbert (Israel) Edan Leshem | (Turkey) Altuğ Çelikbilek (France) Albano Olivetti (Israel) Ben Patael (Italy) Alessandro Bega |
| June 4 | Japan F7 Futures; Karuizawa, Japan; Clay $25,000; Singles and doubles draws | (Japan) Takashi Saito; 6–3, 6–4 | (Japan) Rio Noguchi | (Japan) Gengo Kikuchi (Japan) Makoto Ochi | (Japan) Sora Fukuda (Japan) Sho Shimabukuro (Japan) Jumpei Yamasaki (Japan) Haru Inoue |
| June 4 | Japan F7 Futures; Karuizawa, Japan; Clay $25,000; Singles and doubles draws | (Japan) Sora Fukuda (Japan) Hiromasa Oku; 7–5, 6–4 | (Japan) Yuichiro Inui (Japan) Rio Noguchi | (Japan) Gengo Kikuchi (Japan) Makoto Ochi | (Japan) Sora Fukuda (Japan) Sho Shimabukuro (Japan) Jumpei Yamasaki (Japan) Haru Inoue |
| June 4 | Spain F14 Futures; Huelva, Spain; Clay $25,000; Singles and doubles draws | (Spain) Sergio Gutiérrez Ferrol; 3–6, 7–6^{(7–1)}, 6–2 | (Spain) Pedro Martínez | (Spain) David Vega Hernández (Italy) Raúl Brancaccio | (Sweden) André Göransson (Belgium) Niels Desein (Spain) Alberto Barroso Campos (Spain) Alejandro Davidovich Fokina |
| June 4 | Spain F14 Futures; Huelva, Spain; Clay $25,000; Singles and doubles draws | (Spain) Javier Barranco Cosano (Italy) Raúl Brancaccio; 5–7, 7–6^{(12–10)}, [10–5] | (Sweden) André Göransson (Sweden) Fred Simonsson | (Spain) David Vega Hernández (Italy) Raúl Brancaccio | (Sweden) André Göransson (Belgium) Niels Desein (Spain) Alberto Barroso Campos (Spain) Alejandro Davidovich Fokina |
| June 4 | Uzbekistan F4 Futures; Namangan, Uzbekistan; Hard $25,000; Singles and doubles draws | (Turkey) Cem İlkel; 6–1, 7–6^{(14–12)} | (Russia) Roman Safiullin | (Belarus) Sergey Betov (Uzbekistan) Khumoyun Sultanov | (Uzbekistan) Sanjar Fayziev (Russia) Konstantin Kravchuk (Belarus) Yaraslav Shyla (Russia) Kristian Lozan |
| June 4 | Uzbekistan F4 Futures; Namangan, Uzbekistan; Hard $25,000; Singles and doubles draws | (Uzbekistan) Sanjar Fayziev (Uzbekistan) Khumoyun Sultanov; 7–6^{(8–6)}, 5–7, [10–8] | (Russia) Konstantin Kravchuk (Russia) Roman Safiullin | (Belarus) Sergey Betov (Uzbekistan) Khumoyun Sultanov | (Uzbekistan) Sanjar Fayziev (Russia) Konstantin Kravchuk (Belarus) Yaraslav Shyla (Russia) Kristian Lozan |
| June 4 | Italy F13 Futures; Padua, Italy; Clay $15,000; Singles and doubles draws | (Italy) Riccardo Bellotti; 6–1, 3–6, 6–3 | (Switzerland) Johan Nikles | (Italy) Giovanni Fonio (France) Hugo Grenier | (Italy) Matteo Viola (Italy) Fabrizio Ornago (Italy) Francesco Ferrari (France) Manuel Guinard |
| June 4 | Italy F13 Futures; Padua, Italy; Clay $15,000; Singles and doubles draws | (Hungary) Gábor Borsos (Hungary) Péter Nagy; 6–2, 6–7^{(8–10)}, [10–7] | (Romania) Vasile Antonescu (Romania) Bogdan Ionuț Apostol | (Italy) Giovanni Fonio (France) Hugo Grenier | (Italy) Matteo Viola (Italy) Fabrizio Ornago (Italy) Francesco Ferrari (France) Manuel Guinard |
| June 4 | Korea F1 Futures; Sangju, South Korea; Hard $15,000; Singles and doubles draws | (South Korea) Lim Yong-kyu; 6–4, 7–6^{(7–5)} | (South Korea) Lee Jea-moon | (South Korea) Kim Cheong-eui (Japan) Takuto Niki | (South Korea) Lee Tae-woo (South Korea) Nam Ji-sung (South Korea) Chung Hong (South Korea) Jeong Young-hoon |
| June 4 | Korea F1 Futures; Sangju, South Korea; Hard $15,000; Singles and doubles draws | (South Korea) Lim Yong-kyu (South Korea) Nam Ji-sung; 4–6, 6–4, [10–5] | (United States) Alec Adamson (France) Clément Larrière | (South Korea) Kim Cheong-eui (Japan) Takuto Niki | (South Korea) Lee Tae-woo (South Korea) Nam Ji-sung (South Korea) Chung Hong (South Korea) Jeong Young-hoon |
| June 4 | Tunisia F22 Futures; Hammamet, Tunisia; Clay $15,000; Singles and doubles draws | (Russia) Andrey Chepelev; 6–4, 6–7^{(5–7)}, 6–4 | (Argentina) Juan Ignacio Galarza | (Romania) Bogdan Borza (Tunisia) Anis Ghorbel | (Tunisia) Aziz Dougaz (Argentina) Felipe Acosta (France) François-Arthur Vibert (Romania) Dragoș Dima |
| June 4 | Tunisia F22 Futures; Hammamet, Tunisia; Clay $15,000; Singles and doubles draws | (Tunisia) Aziz Dougaz (Tunisia) Anis Ghorbel; 7–5, 7–5 | (Argentina) Santiago Besada (Argentina) Juan Ignacio Galarza | (Romania) Bogdan Borza (Tunisia) Anis Ghorbel | (Tunisia) Aziz Dougaz (Argentina) Felipe Acosta (France) François-Arthur Vibert (Romania) Dragoș Dima |
| June 4 | Turkey F22 Futures; Antalya, Turkey; Clay $15,000; Singles and doubles draws | (Austria) Thomas Statzberger; 6–3, 1–0, ret. | (Australia) James Duckworth | (Belgium) Christopher Heyman (Italy) Nicolò Turchetti | (Brazil) Wilson Leite (Spain) Oscar Manciñeiras Cornella (Georgia (country)) Aleksandre Metreveli (Turkey) Mert Naci Türker |
| June 4 | Turkey F22 Futures; Antalya, Turkey; Clay $15,000; Singles and doubles draws | (Brazil) Wilson Leite (Italy) Alexander Weis; 6–4, 6–4 | (Turkey) Can Kaya (Turkey) Çağatay Sami Söke | (Belgium) Christopher Heyman (Italy) Nicolò Turchetti | (Brazil) Wilson Leite (Spain) Oscar Manciñeiras Cornella (Georgia (country)) Aleksandre Metreveli (Turkey) Mert Naci Türker |
| June 4 | Zimbabwe F2 Futures; Harare, Zimbabwe; Hard $15,000; Singles and doubles draws | (Argentina) Matías Franco Descotte; 6–2, 7–5 | (United Kingdom) Isaac Stoute | (United States) Connor Farren (Germany) Frederik Press | (Bosnia and Herzegovina) Darko Bojanović (Zimbabwe) Courtney John Lock (Zimbabwe) Mehluli Don Ayanda Sibanda (Zimbabwe) Benjamin Lock |
| June 4 | Zimbabwe F2 Futures; Harare, Zimbabwe; Hard $15,000; Singles and doubles draws | (Zimbabwe) Benjamin Lock (Zimbabwe) Courtney John Lock; 6–2, 6–3 | (United States) Connor Farren (Germany) Milen Ianakiev | (United States) Connor Farren (Germany) Frederik Press | (Bosnia and Herzegovina) Darko Bojanović (Zimbabwe) Courtney John Lock (Zimbabwe) Mehluli Don Ayanda Sibanda (Zimbabwe) Benjamin Lock |
| June 11 | Hungary F4 Futures; Gyula, Hungary; Clay $25,000; Singles and doubles draws | (Austria) Lenny Hampel; 7–6^{(7–4)}, 3–0, ret. | (Hungary) Máté Valkusz | (Netherlands) Tim van Rijthoven (Brazil) Oscar José Gutierrez | (Argentina) Patricio Heras (Czech Republic) Vít Kopřiva (Hungary) Péter Nagy (Austria) Pascal Brunner |
| June 11 | Hungary F4 Futures; Gyula, Hungary; Clay $25,000; Singles and doubles draws | (Australia) Dane Propoggia (Australia) Scott Puodziunas; 6–4, 6–1 | (Sweden) André Göransson (Sweden) Fred Simonsson | (Netherlands) Tim van Rijthoven (Brazil) Oscar José Gutierrez | (Argentina) Patricio Heras (Czech Republic) Vít Kopřiva (Hungary) Péter Nagy (Austria) Pascal Brunner |
| June 11 | USA F13 Futures; Winston-Salem, United States; Hard $25,000; Singles and doubles draws | (Cyprus) Petros Chrysochos; 6–2, 1–6, 6–4 | (United States) Michael Redlicki | (United States) Alexander Ritschard (Brazil) Karue Sell | (United Kingdom) Ryan Peniston (United States) Yuval Solomon (Switzerland) Marc-Andrea Hüsler (United States) Brian Shi |
| June 11 | USA F13 Futures; Winston-Salem, United States; Hard $25,000; Singles and doubles draws | (Switzerland) Marc-Andrea Hüsler (Netherlands) Sem Verbeek; 7–6^{(9–7)}, 6–1 | (United States) Trevor Allen Johnson (United States) Ronnie Schneider | (United States) Alexander Ritschard (Brazil) Karue Sell | (United Kingdom) Ryan Peniston (United States) Yuval Solomon (Switzerland) Marc-Andrea Hüsler (United States) Brian Shi |
| June 11 | USA F14 Futures; Buffalo, United States; Clay $25,000; Singles and doubles draws | (United States) Alex Rybakov; 7–6^{(7–5)}, 3–1, ret. | (United States) Deiton Baughman | (Mexico) Lucas Gómez (Russia) Markos Kalovelonis | (Canada) Pavel Krainik (Argentina) Mateo Nicolás Martínez (Colombia) Alejandro Gómez (Argentina) Eduardo Agustín Torre |
| June 11 | USA F14 Futures; Buffalo, United States; Clay $25,000; Singles and doubles draws | (Colombia) Alejandro Gómez (Mexico) Lucas Gómez; 6–3, 6–4 | (Argentina) Matías Franco Descotte (Argentina) Eduardo Agustín Torre | (Mexico) Lucas Gómez (Russia) Markos Kalovelonis | (Canada) Pavel Krainik (Argentina) Mateo Nicolás Martínez (Colombia) Alejandro Gómez (Argentina) Eduardo Agustín Torre |
| June 11 | Israel F9 Futures; Netanya, Israel; Hard $15,000; Singles and doubles draws | (Israel) Edan Leshem; 6–2, 6–1 | (Italy) Alessandro Bega | (Israel) Or Ram-Harel (Israel) Mor Bulis | (France) Sébastien Boltz (France) Albano Olivetti (France) Constantin Bittoun Kouzmine (Mexico) Tigre Hank |
| June 11 | Israel F9 Futures; Netanya, Israel; Hard $15,000; Singles and doubles draws | (France) Dan Added (France) Albano Olivetti; 6–3, 6–4 | (Italy) Francesco Ferrari (Mexico) Tigre Hank | (Israel) Or Ram-Harel (Israel) Mor Bulis | (France) Sébastien Boltz (France) Albano Olivetti (France) Constantin Bittoun Kouzmine (Mexico) Tigre Hank |
| June 11 | Italy F14 Futures; Bergamo, Italy; Clay $15,000; Singles and doubles draws | (Italy) Riccardo Bellotti; 6–4, 6–3 | (Slovenia) Nik Razboršek | (Italy) Jacopo Berrettini (Germany) Marvin Netuschil | (Italy) Giovanni Fonio (Italy) Gregorio Lulli (Germany) Peter Heller (Italy) Alessandro Petrone |
| June 11 | Italy F14 Futures; Bergamo, Italy; Clay $15,000; Singles and doubles draws | (Italy) Enrico Dalla Valle (Italy) Pietro Rondoni; 6–0, 6–3 | (Italy) Lorenzo Frigerio (Italy) Jacopo Stefanini | (Italy) Jacopo Berrettini (Germany) Marvin Netuschil | (Italy) Giovanni Fonio (Italy) Gregorio Lulli (Germany) Peter Heller (Italy) Alessandro Petrone |
| June 11 | Japan F8 Futures; Akishima, Japan; Carpet $15,000; Singles and doubles draws | (Japan) Rio Noguchi; 6–3, 6–4 | (Japan) Gengo Kikuchi | (Japan) Yuki Mochizuki (Japan) Sho Katayama | (Japan) Rimpei Kawakami (Japan) Ryota Tanuma (Japan) Yuya Kibi (Japan) Kaito Uesugi |
| June 11 | Japan F8 Futures; Akishima, Japan; Carpet $15,000; Singles and doubles draws | (Japan) Masakatsu Noguchi (Japan) Masaki Sasai; 6–7^{(3–7)}, 6–4, [10–8] | (Japan) Yuya Kibi (Japan) Arata Onozawa | (Japan) Yuki Mochizuki (Japan) Sho Katayama | (Japan) Rimpei Kawakami (Japan) Ryota Tanuma (Japan) Yuya Kibi (Japan) Kaito Uesugi |
| June 11 | Korea F2 Futures; Gyeongsan, South Korea; Hard $15,000; Singles and doubles draws | (South Korea) Chung Yun-seong; 6–4, 6–3 | (South Korea) Nam Ji-sung | (South Korea) Kim Cheong-eui (South Korea) Kim Jae-hwan | (South Korea) Son Ji-hoon (South Korea) Hong Seong-chan (South Korea) Moon Ju-hae (South Korea) Oh Chan-yeong |
| June 11 | Korea F2 Futures; Gyeongsan, South Korea; Hard $15,000; Singles and doubles draws | (South Korea) Lim Yong-kyu (South Korea) Nam Ji-sung; 6–4, 6–1 | (United States) John Paul Fruttero (Japan) Takuto Niki | (South Korea) Kim Cheong-eui (South Korea) Kim Jae-hwan | (South Korea) Son Ji-hoon (South Korea) Hong Seong-chan (South Korea) Moon Ju-hae (South Korea) Oh Chan-yeong |
| June 11 | Spain F15 Futures; Martos, Spain; Hard $15,000; Singles and doubles draws | (Belgium) Clément Geens; 7–5, 7–5 | (United States) Sumit Sarkar | (Spain) Pablo Vivero González (Spain) Diego-José Manrique-Velázquez | (Russia) Yan Sabanin (Belgium) Romain Barbosa (Spain) Ignasi de Rueda de Genover (Spain) José Francisco Vidal Azorín |
| June 11 | Spain F15 Futures; Martos, Spain; Hard $15,000; Singles and doubles draws | (Belgium) Romain Barbosa (Belgium) Clément Geens; 6–4, 5–7, [10–7] | (France) Mick Lescure (Belgium) Omar Salman | (Spain) Pablo Vivero González (Spain) Diego-José Manrique-Velázquez | (Russia) Yan Sabanin (Belgium) Romain Barbosa (Spain) Ignasi de Rueda de Genover (Spain) José Francisco Vidal Azorín |
| June 11 | Sri Lanka F1 Futures; Colombo, Sri Lanka; Clay $15,000; Singles and doubles draws | (Russia) Alexander Zhurbin; 7–5, 6–2 | (India) Manish Sureshkumar | (India) Mohit Mayur Jayaprakash (Austria) Alexander Erler | (India) Abhinav Sanjeev Shanmugam (Thailand) Pruchya Isaro (Argentina) Ignacio Carou (Ukraine) Vladyslav Orlov |
| June 11 | Sri Lanka F1 Futures; Colombo, Sri Lanka; Clay $15,000; Singles and doubles draws | (Ukraine) Vladyslav Orlov (Spain) David Pérez Sanz; 4–6, 6–1, [10–6] | (Brazil) Diego Matos (Brazil) Thales Turini | (India) Mohit Mayur Jayaprakash (Austria) Alexander Erler | (India) Abhinav Sanjeev Shanmugam (Thailand) Pruchya Isaro (Argentina) Ignacio Carou (Ukraine) Vladyslav Orlov |
| June 11 | Tunisia F23 Futures; Hammamet, Tunisia; Clay $15,000; Singles and doubles draws | (Portugal) Frederico Ferreira Silva; 7–6^{(7–5)}, 6–7^{(7–9)}, 7–5 | (Spain) Oriol Roca Batalla | (Italy) Nicolò Turchetti (Lebanon) Hady Habib | (Italy) Simone Roncalli (France) Hugo Pontico (Tunisia) Aziz Dougaz (France) Gabriel Petit |
| June 11 | Tunisia F23 Futures; Hammamet, Tunisia; Clay $15,000; Singles and doubles draws | (Spain) Sergio Barranco (Spain) Oriol Roca Batalla; 4–6, 6–1, [10–8] | (Tunisia) Aziz Dougaz (Tunisia) Anis Ghorbel | (Italy) Nicolò Turchetti (Lebanon) Hady Habib | (Italy) Simone Roncalli (France) Hugo Pontico (Tunisia) Aziz Dougaz (France) Gabriel Petit |
| June 11 | Zimbabwe F3 Futures; Harare, Zimbabwe; Hard $15,000; Singles and doubles draws | (Zimbabwe) Takanyi Garanganga; 6–1, 6–4 | (Zimbabwe) Benjamin Lock | (Zimbabwe) Mehluli Don Ayanda Sibanda (South Africa) Lance-Pierre du Toit | (India) Anirudh Chandrasekar (India) Dhruv Sunish (United Kingdom) Isaac Stoute (United States) Emmett Ward |
| June 11 | Zimbabwe F3 Futures; Harare, Zimbabwe; Hard $15,000; Singles and doubles draws | (Zimbabwe) Benjamin Lock (Zimbabwe) Courtney John Lock; Walkover | (United States) Jordan Parker (United Kingdom) Isaac Stoute | (Zimbabwe) Mehluli Don Ayanda Sibanda (South Africa) Lance-Pierre du Toit | (India) Anirudh Chandrasekar (India) Dhruv Sunish (United Kingdom) Isaac Stoute (United States) Emmett Ward |
| June 18 | Canada F3 Futures; Calgary, Canada; Hard $25,000; Singles and doubles draws | (United States) Thai-Son Kwiatkowski; 6–4, 6–3 | (United States) Paul Oosterbaan | (Canada) Steven Diez (Bolivia) Juan Carlos Aguilar | (United States) Tyler Lu (United States) Junior Alexander Ore (Venezuela) Ricardo Rodríguez (Canada) Samuel Monette |
| June 18 | Canada F3 Futures; Calgary, Canada; Hard $25,000; Singles and doubles draws | (Canada) Alexis Galarneau (Canada) Benjamin Sigouin; 7–5, 7–6^{(7–4)} | (United States) Alexios Halebian (Canada) Samuel Monette | (Canada) Steven Diez (Bolivia) Juan Carlos Aguilar | (United States) Tyler Lu (United States) Junior Alexander Ore (Venezuela) Ricardo Rodríguez (Canada) Samuel Monette |
| June 18 | France F10 Futures; Toulouse, France; Clay $25,000+H; Singles and doubles draws | (Russia) Alen Avidzba; 7–6^{(8–6)}, 6–3 | (France) Fabien Reboul | (Germany) Pascal Meis (France) Antoine Cornut-Chauvinc | (France) Maxime Tchoutakian (Spain) Alberto Romero de Ávila Senise (France) Axel Michon (Argentina) Juan Pablo Ficovich |
| June 18 | France F10 Futures; Toulouse, France; Clay $25,000+H; Singles and doubles draws | (United States) Ulises Blanch (Argentina) Juan Pablo Ficovich; 6–2, 6–2 | (France) Antoine Cornut-Chauvinc (France) Matteo Martineau | (Germany) Pascal Meis (France) Antoine Cornut-Chauvinc | (France) Maxime Tchoutakian (Spain) Alberto Romero de Ávila Senise (France) Axel Michon (Argentina) Juan Pablo Ficovich |
| June 18 | Hungary F5 Futures; Budapest, Hungary; Clay $25,000; Singles and doubles draws | (Hungary) Zsombor Piros; 6–3, 6–2 | (Romania) Dragoș Dima | (Brazil) Bruno Sant'Anna (Germany) Peter Torebko | (Czech Republic) Tadeáš Paroulek (Brazil) Oscar José Gutierrez (Hungary) Gergely Madarász (Brazil) Wilson Leite |
| June 18 | Hungary F5 Futures; Budapest, Hungary; Clay $25,000; Singles and doubles draws | (Argentina) Franco Agamenone (Argentina) Patricio Heras; 1–6, 6–2, [10–7] | (Sweden) Gustav Hansson (Sweden) Fred Simonsson | (Brazil) Bruno Sant'Anna (Germany) Peter Torebko | (Czech Republic) Tadeáš Paroulek (Brazil) Oscar José Gutierrez (Hungary) Gergely Madarász (Brazil) Wilson Leite |
| June 18 | USA F15 Futures; Winston-Salem, United States; Hard $25,000; Singles and doubles draws | (United States) Michael Redlicki; 6–3, 3–6, 6–1 | (United States) Tommy Paul | (United States) Henry Craig (Tunisia) Skander Mansouri | (Brazil) Karue Sell (United States) Sam Riffice (United States) Ronnie Schneider (Cyprus) Petros Chrysochos |
| June 18 | USA F15 Futures; Winston-Salem, United States; Hard $25,000; Singles and doubles draws | (United States) Harrison Adams (United States) JC Aragone; 7–5, 6–7^{(4–7)}, [10–3] | (United States) Ian Dempster (Germany) Christian Seraphim | (United States) Henry Craig (Tunisia) Skander Mansouri | (Brazil) Karue Sell (United States) Sam Riffice (United States) Ronnie Schneider (Cyprus) Petros Chrysochos |
| June 18 | Belgium F1 Futures; Havré, Belgium; Clay $15,000; Singles and doubles draws | (Germany) Marvin Netuschil; 6–2, 6–3 | (Spain) Jaume Pla Malfeito | (Belgium) Clément Geens (Switzerland) Yann Marti | (Estonia) Kenneth Raisma (Belgium) Yannik Reuter (Belgium) Jeroen Vanneste (Belgium) Jonas Merckx |
| June 18 | Belgium F1 Futures; Havré, Belgium; Clay $15,000; Singles and doubles draws | (Spain) Marc Giner (Spain) Jaume Pla Malfeito; 7–5, 3–6, [10–4] | (Brazil) João Lucas Reis da Silva (Brazil) Fernando Yamacita | (Belgium) Clément Geens (Switzerland) Yann Marti | (Estonia) Kenneth Raisma (Belgium) Yannik Reuter (Belgium) Jeroen Vanneste (Belgium) Jonas Merckx |
| June 18 | Germany F4 Futures; Kaltenkirchen, Germany; Clay $15,000; Singles and doubles draws | (Bulgaria) Dimitar Kuzmanov; 6–2, 6–3 | (Germany) Marvin Möller | (Germany) Dominik Böhler (Bosnia and Herzegovina) Nerman Fatić | (Germany) Nico Matic (United States) Sekou Bangoura (Germany) Louis Wessels (Germany) George von Massow |
| June 18 | Germany F4 Futures; Kaltenkirchen, Germany; Clay $15,000; Singles and doubles draws | (Netherlands) Roy Sarut de Valk (Bosnia and Herzegovina) Nerman Fatić; 7–5, 4–6, [10–8] | (Germany) Dominik Böhler (Germany) Christian Hirschmüller | (Germany) Dominik Böhler (Bosnia and Herzegovina) Nerman Fatić | (Germany) Nico Matic (United States) Sekou Bangoura (Germany) Louis Wessels (Germany) George von Massow |
| June 18 | Guam F1 Futures; Tumon, Guam; Hard $15,000; Singles and doubles draws | (Japan) Yuta Shimizu; 6–3, 6–2 | (Japan) Yuichi Ito | (Japan) Hiroyasu Ehara (Australia) Thomas Fancutt | (Japan) Sho Katayama (Japan) Rimpei Kawakami (Japan) Shunrou Takeshima (Sweden) Niklas Johansson |
| June 18 | Guam F1 Futures; Tumon, Guam; Hard $15,000; Singles and doubles draws | (Japan) Hiroyasu Ehara (Japan) Sho Katayama; 6–3, 6–3 | (Australia) Jake Delaney (Australia) Thomas Fancutt | (Japan) Hiroyasu Ehara (Australia) Thomas Fancutt | (Japan) Sho Katayama (Japan) Rimpei Kawakami (Japan) Shunrou Takeshima (Sweden) Niklas Johansson |
| June 18 | Israel F10 Futures; Kiryat Shmona, Israel; Hard $15,000; Singles and doubles draws | (Israel) Or Ram-Harel; 6–4, 6–3 | (France) Constantin Bittoun Kouzmine | (Australia) Cameron Green (Italy) Francesco Ferrari | (Italy) Francesco Vilardo (Switzerland) Luca Castelnuovo (United States) Conor Berg (Israel) Alon Elia |
| June 18 | Israel F10 Futures; Kiryat Shmona, Israel; Hard $15,000; Singles and doubles draws | (Italy) Francesco Ferrari (Italy) Francesco Vilardo; 6–1, 6–2 | (United States) Conor Berg (United Kingdom) Scott Duncan | (Australia) Cameron Green (Italy) Francesco Ferrari | (Italy) Francesco Vilardo (Switzerland) Luca Castelnuovo (United States) Conor Berg (Israel) Alon Elia |
| June 18 | Italy F15 Futures; Sassuolo, Italy; Clay $15,000; Singles and doubles draws | (Italy) Pietro Rondoni; 6–7^{(4–7)}, 6–4, 6–2 | (Germany) Peter Heller | (Italy) Andrea Guerrieri (Argentina) Franco Capalbo | (Italy) Alessandro Ceppellini (Italy) Luca Nardi (Argentina) Gerónimo Espín Busleiman (Italy) Lorenzo Bocchi |
| June 18 | Italy F15 Futures; Sassuolo, Italy; Clay $15,000; Singles and doubles draws | (Italy) Omar Giacalone (Italy) Pietro Rondoni; 6–2, 7–5 | (Germany) Peter Heller (Austria) Gregor Hutterer | (Italy) Andrea Guerrieri (Argentina) Franco Capalbo | (Italy) Alessandro Ceppellini (Italy) Luca Nardi (Argentina) Gerónimo Espín Busleiman (Italy) Lorenzo Bocchi |
| June 18 | Korea F3 Futures; Daegu, South Korea; Hard $15,000; Singles and doubles draws | (South Korea) Chung Yun-seong; 6–1, 6–3 | (South Korea) Nam Ji-sung | (South Korea) Kwon Soon-woo (Japan) Takuto Niki | (Japan) Jumpei Yamasaki (South Korea) Kwon Oh-hee (South Korea) Kim Jae-hwan (South Korea) Kim Cheong-eui |
| June 18 | Korea F3 Futures; Daegu, South Korea; Hard $15,000; Singles and doubles draws | (South Korea) Chung Yun-seong (South Korea) Hong Seong-chan; Walkover | (South Korea) Kwon Soon-woo (South Korea) Lim Yong-kyu | (South Korea) Kwon Soon-woo (Japan) Takuto Niki | (Japan) Jumpei Yamasaki (South Korea) Kwon Oh-hee (South Korea) Kim Jae-hwan (South Korea) Kim Cheong-eui |
| June 18 | Portugal F9 Futures; Póvoa de Varzim, Portugal; Hard $15,000; Singles and doubles draws | (Chinese Taipei) Tseng Chun-hsin; 6–3, 6–4 | (Portugal) Nuno Borges | (France) Mick Lescure (Portugal) Tiago Cação | (France) Baptiste Crepatte (Zimbabwe) Benjamin Lock (Portugal) Duarte Vale (Spain) Javier Pulgar-García |
| June 18 | Portugal F9 Futures; Póvoa de Varzim, Portugal; Hard $15,000; Singles and doubles draws | (Portugal) Nuno Borges (Portugal) Francisco Cabral; 6–4, 6–4 | (France) Romain Bauvy (France) Hugo Voljacques | (France) Mick Lescure (Portugal) Tiago Cação | (France) Baptiste Crepatte (Zimbabwe) Benjamin Lock (Portugal) Duarte Vale (Spain) Javier Pulgar-García |
| June 18 | Sri Lanka F2 Futures; Colombo, Sri Lanka; Clay $15,000; Singles and doubles draws | (Spain) David Pérez Sanz; 7–6^{(7–5)}, 6–4 | (Russia) Alexander Zhurbin | (India) Manish Sureshkumar (Thailand) Pruchya Isaro | (Brazil) Thales Turini (India) Vinayak Sharma Kaza (Sri Lanka) Sharmal Dissanayake (India) Abhinav Sanjeev Shanmugam |
| June 18 | Sri Lanka F2 Futures; Colombo, Sri Lanka; Clay $15,000; Singles and doubles draws | (Ukraine) Vladyslav Orlov (Spain) David Pérez Sanz; 6–4, 5–7, [10–7] | (Brazil) Diego Matos (Brazil) Thales Turini | (India) Manish Sureshkumar (Thailand) Pruchya Isaro | (Brazil) Thales Turini (India) Vinayak Sharma Kaza (Sri Lanka) Sharmal Dissanayake (India) Abhinav Sanjeev Shanmugam |
| June 18 | Tunisia F24 Futures; Hammamet, Tunisia; Clay $15,000; Singles and doubles draws | (Spain) Oriol Roca Batalla; 6–2, 6–2 | (Argentina) Juan Ignacio Galarza | (Russia) Ronald Slobodchikov (Ecuador) Diego Hidalgo | (Russia) Mikhail Korovin (Tunisia) Aziz Dougaz (United States) Garrett Johns (Argentina) Juan Pablo Grassi Mazzuchi |
| June 18 | Tunisia F24 Futures; Hammamet, Tunisia; Clay $15,000; Singles and doubles draws | (Argentina) Juan Ignacio Galarza (Ecuador) Diego Hidalgo; 6–4, 6–4 | (Russia) Alexander Boborykin (Russia) Timur Kiyamov | (Russia) Ronald Slobodchikov (Ecuador) Diego Hidalgo | (Russia) Mikhail Korovin (Tunisia) Aziz Dougaz (United States) Garrett Johns (Argentina) Juan Pablo Grassi Mazzuchi |
| June 18 | USA F16 Futures; Rochester, United States; Clay $15,000; Singles and doubles draws | (United States) Alex Rybakov; 6–1, 7–6^{(8–6)} | (Russia) Markos Kalovelonis | (United States) Gianni Ross (United States) Andrés Andrade | (United States) Collin Johns (United States) Jordi Arconada (Argentina) Mateo Nicolás Martínez (United States) Ryan Goetz |
| June 18 | USA F16 Futures; Rochester, United States; Clay $15,000; Singles and doubles draws | (United States) Cannon Kingsley (United States) John McNally; 6–4, 6–4 | (Colombia) Alejandro Gómez (Canada) Pavel Krainik | (United States) Gianni Ross (United States) Andrés Andrade | (United States) Collin Johns (United States) Jordi Arconada (Argentina) Mateo Nicolás Martínez (United States) Ryan Goetz |
| June 25 | Belgium F2 Futures; Arlon, Belgium; Clay $25,000; Singles and doubles draws | (Peru) Juan Pablo Varillas; 7–6^{(8–6)}, 4–6, 6–1 | (Belgium) Zizou Bergs | (Belgium) Germain Gigounon (Argentina) Agustín Velotti | (Germany) Elmar Ejupovic (Netherlands) Gijs Brouwer (Netherlands) Jelle Sels (Germany) Pascal Meis |
| June 25 | Belgium F2 Futures; Arlon, Belgium; Clay $25,000; Singles and doubles draws | (Australia) Dane Propoggia (Australia) Scott Puodziunas; 6–1, 6–0 | (Belgium) Jonas Merckx (Belgium) Jeroen Vanneste | (Belgium) Germain Gigounon (Argentina) Agustín Velotti | (Germany) Elmar Ejupovic (Netherlands) Gijs Brouwer (Netherlands) Jelle Sels (Germany) Pascal Meis |
| June 25 | Canada F4 Futures; Kelowna, Canada; Hard $25,000; Singles and doubles draws | (United States) JC Aragone; 6–2, 6–3 | (Canada) Alexis Galarneau | (Canada) Benjamin Sigouin (Canada) Steven Diez | (Venezuela) Ricardo Rodríguez (United States) Colin Markes (Bolivia) Juan Carlos Aguilar (United States) Alexander Ritschard |
| June 25 | Canada F4 Futures; Kelowna, Canada; Hard $25,000; Singles and doubles draws | (Republic of Ireland) Julian Bradley (United States) Thai-Son Kwiatkowski; 7–6^{(7–5)}, 7–5 | (United States) Charlie Emhardt (United States) Samuel Shropshire | (Canada) Benjamin Sigouin (Canada) Steven Diez | (Venezuela) Ricardo Rodríguez (United States) Colin Markes (Bolivia) Juan Carlos Aguilar (United States) Alexander Ritschard |
| June 25 | Czech Republic F4 Futures; Pardubice, Czech Republic; Clay $25,000; Singles and doubles draws | (Czech Republic) Lukáš Rosol; 6–4, 6–0 | (Germany) Peter Torebko | (Czech Republic) Tadeáš Paroulek (Russia) Roman Safiullin | (Austria) Pascal Brunner (Serbia) Marko Miladinović (Czech Republic) Jan Mertl (Russia) Aleksandr Vasilenko |
| June 25 | Czech Republic F4 Futures; Pardubice, Czech Republic; Clay $25,000; Singles and doubles draws | (Hungary) Gábor Borsos (Austria) David Pichler; 1–6, 6–2, [10–6] | (Brazil) Rafael Matos (Brazil) Marcelo Zormann | (Czech Republic) Tadeáš Paroulek (Russia) Roman Safiullin | (Austria) Pascal Brunner (Serbia) Marko Miladinović (Czech Republic) Jan Mertl (Russia) Aleksandr Vasilenko |
| June 25 | France F11 Futures; Montauban, France; Clay $25,000; Singles and doubles draws | (Argentina) Juan Pablo Ficovich; 6–7^{(5–7)}, 6–3, 6–3 | (United States) Ulises Blanch | (France) Ugo Humbert (France) Benjamin Pietri | (Argentina) Thiago Agustín Tirante (Italy) Adelchi Virgili (Spain) Pol Toledo Bagué (France) Grégoire Jacq |
| June 25 | France F11 Futures; Montauban, France; Clay $25,000; Singles and doubles draws | (United States) Ulises Blanch (France) Ugo Humbert; 6–3, 3–6, [10–6] | (Argentina) Patricio Heras (Argentina) Gonzalo Villanueva | (France) Ugo Humbert (France) Benjamin Pietri | (Argentina) Thiago Agustín Tirante (Italy) Adelchi Virgili (Spain) Pol Toledo Bagué (France) Grégoire Jacq |
| June 25 | Hong Kong F1 Futures; Hong Kong; Hard $25,000; Singles and doubles draws | (Japan) Yuki Mochizuki; 4–6, 6–2, 6–1 | (Hong Kong) Wong Hong-kit | (Japan) Jumpei Yamasaki (Thailand) Congsup Congcar | (China) Wang Chukang (Japan) Haru Inoue (India) Sidharth Rawat (Japan) Issei Okamura |
| June 25 | Hong Kong F1 Futures; Hong Kong; Hard $25,000; Singles and doubles draws | (Hong Kong) Wong Chun-hun (Hong Kong) Yeung Pak-long; 6–4, 6–2 | (Philippines) Francis Alcantara (Chinese Taipei) Yi Chu-huan | (Japan) Jumpei Yamasaki (Thailand) Congsup Congcar | (China) Wang Chukang (Japan) Haru Inoue (India) Sidharth Rawat (Japan) Issei Okamura |
| June 25 | Spain F16 Futures; Palma del Río, Spain; Hard $25,000+H; Singles and doubles draws | (Austria) Lucas Miedler; 6–2, 7–6^{(8–6)} | (Norway) Viktor Durasovic | (Kazakhstan) Denis Yevseyev (United Kingdom) Evan Hoyt | (Japan) Kaichi Uchida (France) Maxime Janvier (Spain) Pablo Vivero González (Ukraine) Marat Deviatiarov |
| June 25 | Spain F16 Futures; Palma del Río, Spain; Hard $25,000+H; Singles and doubles draws | (France) Mick Lescure (Colombia) Eduardo Struvay; 7–5, 6–4 | (Ukraine) Marat Deviatiarov (United Kingdom) Evan Hoyt | (Kazakhstan) Denis Yevseyev (United Kingdom) Evan Hoyt | (Japan) Kaichi Uchida (France) Maxime Janvier (Spain) Pablo Vivero González (Ukraine) Marat Deviatiarov |
| June 25 | USA F17 Futures; Tulsa, United States; Hard $25,000; Singles and doubles draws | (Switzerland) Marc-Andrea Hüsler; 6–4, 6–2 | (United States) Sam Riffice | (United States) Martin Redlicki (United States) Emil Reinberg | (United States) Trevor Allen Johnson (United States) J. J. Wolf (Denmark) Mikael Torpegaard (United States) Trent Bryde |
| June 25 | USA F17 Futures; Tulsa, United States; Hard $25,000; Singles and doubles draws | (Moldova) Alexandru Gozun (United States) Emil Reinberg; 7–6^{(8–6)}, 6–3 | (Moldova) Alexander Cozbinov (United States) Trevor Allen Johnson | (United States) Martin Redlicki (United States) Emil Reinberg | (United States) Trevor Allen Johnson (United States) J. J. Wolf (Denmark) Mikael Torpegaard (United States) Trent Bryde |
| June 25 | Germany F5 Futures; Kamen, Germany; Clay $15,000; Singles and doubles draws | (Bulgaria) Dimitar Kuzmanov; 6–1, 7–5 | (United States) Sekou Bangoura | (Germany) Tim Rühl (Hungary) Fábián Marozsán | (Russia) Dimitriy Voronin (Sweden) Markus Eriksson (Sweden) Filip Bergevi (Germany) Christian Hirschmüller |
| June 25 | Germany F5 Futures; Kamen, Germany; Clay $15,000; Singles and doubles draws | (Spain) Marco Neubau (Germany) Robert Strombachs; 6–4, 3–6, [10–5] | (Czech Republic) Petr Nouza (Czech Republic) David Škoch | (Germany) Tim Rühl (Hungary) Fábián Marozsán | (Russia) Dimitriy Voronin (Sweden) Markus Eriksson (Sweden) Filip Bergevi (Germany) Christian Hirschmüller |
| June 25 | Israel F11 Futures; Kiryat Shmona, Israel; Hard $15,000; Singles and doubles draws | (Italy) Francesco Vilardo; 7–6^{(7–3)}, 6–3 | (Mexico) Tigre Hank | (France) Constantin Bittoun Kouzmine (Israel) Jordan Hasson | (Israel) Yshai Oliel (Israel) Yannai Barkai (Germany) Stefan Seifert (Switzerland) Vullnet Tashi |
| June 25 | Israel F11 Futures; Kiryat Shmona, Israel; Hard $15,000; Singles and doubles draws | (Israel) Shahar Elbaz (Israel) Yasha Zemel; 6–2, 7–6^{(7–5)} | (Switzerland) Luca Castelnuovo (Argentina) Nicolás Uryson | (France) Constantin Bittoun Kouzmine (Israel) Jordan Hasson | (Israel) Yshai Oliel (Israel) Yannai Barkai (Germany) Stefan Seifert (Switzerland) Vullnet Tashi |
| June 25 | Italy F16 Futures; Gaeta, Italy; Clay $15,000; Singles and doubles draws | (Italy) Mirko Cutuli; 6–1, 6–4 | (Argentina) Juan Pablo Paz | (Italy) Antonio Massara (Italy) Giulio Zeppieri | (Italy) Alessandro Petrone (Italy) Alessandro Ceppellini (France) Luka Pavlovic (Russia) Kirill Kivattsev |
| June 25 | Italy F16 Futures; Gaeta, Italy; Clay $15,000; Singles and doubles draws | (Italy) Pietro Licciardi (Italy) Giorgio Portaluri; 6–4, 6–3 | (Austria) Peter Goldsteiner (Poland) Maciej Rajski | (Italy) Antonio Massara (Italy) Giulio Zeppieri | (Italy) Alessandro Petrone (Italy) Alessandro Ceppellini (France) Luka Pavlovic (Russia) Kirill Kivattsev |
| June 25 | Netherlands F1 Futures; Alkmaar, Netherlands; Clay $15,000; Singles and doubles draws | (Belgium) Clément Geens; 3–6, 7–6^{(7–2)}, 6–1 | (Netherlands) Botic van de Zandschulp | (Netherlands) Stephan Gerritsen (Germany) Marvin Möller | (Netherlands) Stephan Fransen (Belgium) Benjamin D'Hoe (Argentina) Franco Emanuel Egea (United Kingdom) Andrew Watson |
| June 25 | Netherlands F1 Futures; Alkmaar, Netherlands; Clay $15,000; Singles and doubles draws | (Netherlands) Roy Sarut de Valk (Netherlands) Botic van de Zandschulp; 6–2, 6–3 | (Netherlands) Michiel de Krom (Netherlands) Ryan Nijboer | (Netherlands) Stephan Gerritsen (Germany) Marvin Möller | (Netherlands) Stephan Fransen (Belgium) Benjamin D'Hoe (Argentina) Franco Emanuel Egea (United Kingdom) Andrew Watson |
| June 25 | Portugal F10 Futures; Setúbal, Portugal; Hard $15,000; Singles and doubles draws | (France) Baptise Crepatte; 6–2, 7–5 | (Portugal) Tiago Cação | (France) Maxime Tchoutakian (Portugal) Nuno Borges | (Guatemala) Christopher Díaz Figueroa (Zimbabwe) Benjamin Lock (France) Nicolas Rosenzweig (Portugal) Fred Gil |
| June 25 | Portugal F10 Futures; Setúbal, Portugal; Hard $15,000; Singles and doubles draws | (Guatemala) Christopher Díaz Figueroa (Guatemala) Wilfredo González; 7–5, 2–6, [10–8] | (Portugal) Nuno Borges (Portugal) Francisco Cabral | (France) Maxime Tchoutakian (Portugal) Nuno Borges | (Guatemala) Christopher Díaz Figueroa (Zimbabwe) Benjamin Lock (France) Nicolas Rosenzweig (Portugal) Fred Gil |
| June 25 | Sri Lanka F3 Futures; Colombo, Sri Lanka; Clay $15,000; Singles and doubles draws | (India) Manish Sureshkumar; 7–6^{(8–6)}, 0–6, 6–1 | (Ukraine) Vladyslav Orlov | (Spain) David Pérez Sanz (India) Nitin Kumar Sinha | (Argentina) Ignacio Carou (India) Niki Kaliyanda Poonacha (Poland) Michał Dembek (India) Abhinav Sanjeev Shanmugam |
| June 25 | Sri Lanka F3 Futures; Colombo, Sri Lanka; Clay $15,000; Singles and doubles draws | (Thailand) Jirat Navasirisomboon (Thailand) Chanchai Sookton-Eng; 6–2, 6–4 | (India) Mohit Mayur Jayaprakash (India) Manish Sureshkumar | (Spain) David Pérez Sanz (India) Nitin Kumar Sinha | (Argentina) Ignacio Carou (India) Niki Kaliyanda Poonacha (Poland) Michał Dembek (India) Abhinav Sanjeev Shanmugam |
| June 25 | Tunisia F25 Futures; Hammamet, Tunisia; Clay $15,000; Singles and doubles draws | (Argentina) Juan Ignacio Galarza; 6–3, 7–6^{(9–7)} | (Switzerland) Johan Nikles | (Argentina) Juan Pablo Grassi Mazzuchi (Spain) Nikolás Sánchez Izquierdo | (Bulgaria) Alexandar Lazarov (Argentina) Ezequiel Agustín Santalla (France) Nino Portales (Argentina) Manuel Peña López |
| June 25 | Tunisia F25 Futures; Hammamet, Tunisia; Clay $15,000; Singles and doubles draws | (Argentina) Juan Ignacio Galarza (Ecuador) Diego Hidalgo; 7–5, 6–4 | (Bulgaria) Alexandar Lazarov (Argentina) Manuel Peña López | (Argentina) Juan Pablo Grassi Mazzuchi (Spain) Nikolás Sánchez Izquierdo | (Bulgaria) Alexandar Lazarov (Argentina) Ezequiel Agustín Santalla (France) Nino Portales (Argentina) Manuel Peña López |
| June 25 | USA F18 Futures; Pittsburgh, United States; Clay $15,000; Singles and doubles draws | (Argentina) Mateo Nicolás Martínez; 6–4, 6–4 | (Colombia) Alejandro Gómez | (United Kingdom) Charles Broom (United States) Jordi Arconada | (United States) Grey Hamilton (United States) Andrés Andrade (Russia) Markos Kalovelonis (United States) Strong Kirchheimer |
| June 25 | USA F18 Futures; Pittsburgh, United States; Clay $15,000; Singles and doubles draws | (Argentina) Mateo Nicolás Martínez (United States) Junior Alexander Ore; 7–5, 6–2 | (Colombia) Alejandro Gómez (Ecuador) Emilio Gómez | (United Kingdom) Charles Broom (United States) Jordi Arconada | (United States) Grey Hamilton (United States) Andrés Andrade (Russia) Markos Kalovelonis (United States) Strong Kirchheimer |
