= 2019 ITF Men's World Tennis Tour (April–June) =

2019 edition of the second tier tour for men's professional tennis

The 2019 ITF Men's World Tennis Tour is the 2019 edition of the second-tier tour for men's professional tennis. It is organised by the International Tennis Federation and is a tier below the ATP Tour. The ITF Men's World Tennis Tour includes tournaments with prize money ranging from $15,000 to $25,000.

== Key ==
M25 tournaments
M15 tournaments

== Month ==
=== April ===
Week of	Tournament	Winner	Runners-up	Semifinalists	Quarterfinalists
April 1	Pula, Italy; Clay; M25; Singles and Doubles Draws	(France) Laurent Lokoli; 5–7, 7–5, 6–2	(Serbia) Miljan Zekić	(Bosnia and Herzegovina) Nerman Fatić (Germany) Peter Torebko	(Italy) Alexander Weis (Hungary) Péter Nagy (France) Matteo Martineau (Hungary) Zsombor Piros
April 1	Pula, Italy; Clay; M25; Singles and Doubles Draws	(Romania) Victor Vlad Cornea (Romania) Alexandru Jecan; 6–7^{(5–7)}, 6–4, [10–4]	(Romania) Bogdan Ionuț Apostol (Romania) Nicolae Frunză	(Bosnia and Herzegovina) Nerman Fatić (Germany) Peter Torebko	(Italy) Alexander Weis (Hungary) Péter Nagy (France) Matteo Martineau (Hungary) Zsombor Piros
April 1	Bolton, United Kingdom; Hard (indoor); M25; Singles and Doubles Draws	(Netherlands) Botic van de Zandschulp; 7–6^{(7–2)}, 6–7^{(6–8)}, 7–5	(Netherlands) Igor Sijsling	(Germany) Julian Lenz (United Kingdom) Lloyd Glasspool	(Netherlands) Gijs Brouwer (Netherlands) Tim van Rijthoven (United Kingdom) Evan Hoyt (Switzerland) Marc-Andrea Hüsler
April 1	Bolton, United Kingdom; Hard (indoor); M25; Singles and Doubles Draws	(Netherlands) Ryan Nijboer (Netherlands) Tim van Rijthoven; 7–6^{(7–2)}, 3–6, [10–5]	(Netherlands) Gijs Brouwer (Netherlands) Glenn Smits	(Germany) Julian Lenz (United Kingdom) Lloyd Glasspool	(Netherlands) Gijs Brouwer (Netherlands) Tim van Rijthoven (United Kingdom) Evan Hoyt (Switzerland) Marc-Andrea Hüsler
April 1	Pinamar, Argentina; Clay; M15; Singles and Doubles Draws	(Brazil) Pedro Sakamoto; 6–3, 6–3	(Argentina) Manuel Peña López	(Argentina) Matías Zukas (Argentina) Juan Manuel Cerúndolo	(Argentina) Tomás Lipovšek Puches (Argentina) Juan Pablo Ficovich (Argentina) Thiago Agustín Tirante (Argentina) Camilo Ugo Carabelli
April 1	Pinamar, Argentina; Clay; M15; Singles and Doubles Draws	(Argentina) Tomás Lipovšek Puches (Argentina) Matías Zukas; 6–1, 4–6, [10–2]	(Argentina) Genaro Alberto Olivieri (Argentina) Camilo Ugo Carabelli	(Argentina) Matías Zukas (Argentina) Juan Manuel Cerúndolo	(Argentina) Tomás Lipovšek Puches (Argentina) Juan Pablo Ficovich (Argentina) Thiago Agustín Tirante (Argentina) Camilo Ugo Carabelli
April 1	Sharm El Sheikh, Egypt; Hard; M15; Singles and Doubles Draws	(Slovakia) Lukáš Klein; 6–2, 6–3	(Poland) Daniel Michalski	(Egypt) Youssef Hossam (Italy) Erik Crepaldi	(Czech Republic) Marek Jaloviec (Germany) Robert Strombachs (Poland) Kacper Żuk (Germany) Niklas Guttau
April 1	Sharm El Sheikh, Egypt; Hard; M15; Singles and Doubles Draws	(Poland) Michał Dembek (Poland) Daniel Michalski; 6–2, 3–6, [10–8]	(Czech Republic) Marek Jaloviec (Slovakia) Lukáš Klein	(Egypt) Youssef Hossam (Italy) Erik Crepaldi	(Czech Republic) Marek Jaloviec (Germany) Robert Strombachs (Poland) Kacper Żuk (Germany) Niklas Guttau
April 1	Kashiwa, Japan; Hard; M15; Singles and Doubles Draws	(Japan) Jumpei Yamasaki; 6–2, 2–6, 6–2	(Japan) Yuki Mochizuki	(Japan) Yusuke Takahashi (Japan) Makoto Ochi	(Japan) Sho Shimabukuro (Japan) Yunosuke Tanaka (South Korea) Kim Cheong-eui (Japan) Shintaro Imai
April 1	Kashiwa, Japan; Hard; M15; Singles and Doubles Draws	(Japan) Yusuke Takahashi (Japan) Jumpei Yamasaki; 6–1, 6–3	(South Korea) Kim Cheong-eui (South Korea) Nam Ji-sung	(Japan) Yusuke Takahashi (Japan) Makoto Ochi	(Japan) Sho Shimabukuro (Japan) Yunosuke Tanaka (South Korea) Kim Cheong-eui (Japan) Shintaro Imai
April 1	Tabarka, Tunisia; Clay; M15; Singles and Doubles Draws	(Republic of Ireland) Simon Carr; 6–1, 6–3	(Sweden) Christian Lindell	(Sweden) Markus Eriksson (France) Corentin Denolly	(France) Maxime Hamou (France) Jules Okala (Argentina) Ignacio Carou (Italy) Marco Miceli
April 1	Tabarka, Tunisia; Clay; M15; Singles and Doubles Draws	(Sweden) Filip Bergevi (Sweden) Markus Eriksson; 6–3, 6–1	(Republic of Ireland) Simon Carr (France) Amaury Delmas	(Sweden) Markus Eriksson (France) Corentin Denolly	(France) Maxime Hamou (France) Jules Okala (Argentina) Ignacio Carou (Italy) Marco Miceli
April 1	Antalya, Turkey; Clay; M15; Singles and Doubles Draws	(Brazil) Felipe Meligeni Alves; 6–3, 1–0, ret.	(Belgium) Clément Geens	(Turkey) Marsel İlhan (Romania) Dan Alexandru Tomescu	(Czech Republic) Václav Šafránek (Romania) Valentin Vanta (Russia) Shalva Dzhanashiya (Russia) Denis Klok
April 1	Antalya, Turkey; Clay; M15; Singles and Doubles Draws	(Kazakhstan) Grigoriy Lomakin (Ukraine) Vladyslav Orlov; 6–4, 6–7^{(4–7)}, [10–6]	(Switzerland) Louroi Martínez (Switzerland) Damien Wenger	(Turkey) Marsel İlhan (Romania) Dan Alexandru Tomescu	(Czech Republic) Václav Šafránek (Romania) Valentin Vanta (Russia) Shalva Dzhanashiya (Russia) Denis Klok
April 8	Pula, Italy; Clay; M25; Singles and Doubles Draws	Tournament was cancelled after the completion of the second round due to ongoing poor weather			(Brazil) Wilson Leite (Croatia) Matej Sabanov (Brazil) Bruno Sant'Anna (Hungary) Péter Nagy (France) Laurent Lokoli (Italy) Liam Caruana (Colombia) Alejandro Gómez (Czech Republic) Jan Šátral
April 8	Matsuyama, Japan; Hard; M25; Singles and Doubles Draws	(Japan) Shuichi Sekiguchi; 6–4, 6–4	(Japan) Takuto Niki	(Thailand) Wishaya Trongcharoenchaikul (South Korea) Hong Seong-chan	(United States) Gage Brymer (Australia) Rinky Hijikata (Japan) Sho Shimabukuro (Japan) Naoki Tajima
April 8	Matsuyama, Japan; Hard; M25; Singles and Doubles Draws	(Japan) Shinji Hazawa (Japan) Naoki Tajima; 4–6, 6–1, [10–7]	(South Korea) Kim Cheong-eui (South Korea) Nam Ji-sung	(Thailand) Wishaya Trongcharoenchaikul (South Korea) Hong Seong-chan	(United States) Gage Brymer (Australia) Rinky Hijikata (Japan) Sho Shimabukuro (Japan) Naoki Tajima
April 8	Shymkent, Kazakhstan; Clay; M25; Singles and Doubles Draws	(Russia) Roman Safiullin; 7–6^{(7–2)}, 6–2	(Russia) Alen Avidzba	(Uzbekistan) Sanjar Fayziev (Serbia) Dejan Katić	(India) Sidharth Rawat (Uzbekistan) Khumoyun Sultanov (Kazakhstan) Timofei Skatov (Kazakhstan) Andrey Golubev
April 8	Shymkent, Kazakhstan; Clay; M25; Singles and Doubles Draws	(Uzbekistan) Sanjar Fayziev (Ukraine) Vladyslav Manafov; 6–2, 6–1	(Russia) Yan Bondarevskiy (Belarus) Ivan Liutarevich	(Uzbekistan) Sanjar Fayziev (Serbia) Dejan Katić	(India) Sidharth Rawat (Uzbekistan) Khumoyun Sultanov (Kazakhstan) Timofei Skatov (Kazakhstan) Andrey Golubev
April 8	Abuja, Nigeria; Hard; M25+H; Singles and Doubles Draws	(France) Sadio Doumbia; 6–4, 6–3	(France) Jaimee Floyd Angele	(France) Dan Added (India) Arjun Kadhe	(United States) Peter Kobelt (United States) William Bushamuka (Zimbabwe) Benjamin Lock (Sweden) Simon Yitbarek
April 8	Abuja, Nigeria; Hard; M25+H; Singles and Doubles Draws	(France) Sadio Doumbia (France) Fabien Reboul; 6–7^{(5–7)}, 6–3, [10–7]	(Zimbabwe) Benjamin Lock (Zimbabwe) Courtney John Lock	(France) Dan Added (India) Arjun Kadhe	(United States) Peter Kobelt (United States) William Bushamuka (Zimbabwe) Benjamin Lock (Sweden) Simon Yitbarek
April 8	Sunderland, United Kingdom; Hard (indoor); M25; Singles and Doubles Draws	(Finland) Emil Ruusuvuori; 6–2, 7–5	(Spain) Andrés Artuñedo	(Netherlands) Igor Sijsling (Belgium) Zizou Bergs	(Belgium) Yannick Mertens (Germany) Julian Lenz (United States) Martin Redlicki (United Kingdom) Ryan Peniston
April 8	Sunderland, United Kingdom; Hard (indoor); M25; Singles and Doubles Draws	(United States) Hunter Johnson (United States) Yates Johnson; 6–4, 6–3	(Republic of Ireland) Peter Bothwell (United Kingdom) Scott Duncan	(Netherlands) Igor Sijsling (Belgium) Zizou Bergs	(Belgium) Yannick Mertens (Germany) Julian Lenz (United States) Martin Redlicki (United Kingdom) Ryan Peniston
April 8	Sharm El Sheikh, Egypt; Hard; M15; Singles and Doubles Draws	(Slovakia) Lukáš Klein; 6–4, 6–3	(Switzerland) Jakub Paul	(Poland) Daniel Michalski (Colombia) Eduardo Struvay	(Egypt) Issam Haitham Taweel (Poland) Kacper Żuk (Poland) Michał Dembek (Russia) Boris Pokotilov
April 8	Sharm El Sheikh, Egypt; Hard; M15; Singles and Doubles Draws	(Russia) Timur Kiyamov (Colombia) Eduardo Struvay; 6–3, 2–6, [10–5]	(India) Vasisht Cheruku (India) S D Prajwal Dev	(Poland) Daniel Michalski (Colombia) Eduardo Struvay	(Egypt) Issam Haitham Taweel (Poland) Kacper Żuk (Poland) Michał Dembek (Russia) Boris Pokotilov
April 8	Cancún, Mexico; Hard; M15; Singles and Doubles Draws	(United States) Jordi Arconada; 6–4, 6–2	(Peru) Nicolás Álvarez	(Italy) Lorenzo Frigerio (United States) Adam El Mihdawy	(France) Hugo Grenier (Belgium) Michael Geerts (France) Jean Thirouin (France) Gabriel Petit
April 8	Cancún, Mexico; Hard; M15; Singles and Doubles Draws	(Republic of Ireland) Julian Bradley (United States) Henry Craig; 6–3, 6–3	(Ecuador) Iván Endara (Peru) Jorge Panta	(Italy) Lorenzo Frigerio (United States) Adam El Mihdawy	(France) Hugo Grenier (Belgium) Michael Geerts (France) Jean Thirouin (France) Gabriel Petit
April 8	Reus, Spain; Clay; M15; Singles and Doubles Draws	(Spain) Eduard Esteve Lobato; 6–4, 6–1	(Switzerland) Johan Nikles	(Brazil) Rafael Matos (France) Hugo Gaston	(Brazil) Orlando Luz (Spain) Pol Martín Tiffon (Brazil) Felipe Meligeni Alves (Spain) Nikolás Sánchez Izquierdo
April 8	Reus, Spain; Clay; M15; Singles and Doubles Draws	(Brazil) Orlando Luz (Brazil) Rafael Matos; 6–3, 4–6, [10–6]	(Portugal) Francisco Cabral (Portugal) Luís Faria	(Brazil) Rafael Matos (France) Hugo Gaston	(Brazil) Orlando Luz (Spain) Pol Martín Tiffon (Brazil) Felipe Meligeni Alves (Spain) Nikolás Sánchez Izquierdo
April 8	Tabarka, Tunisia; Clay; M15; Singles and Doubles Draws	(France) Maxime Hamou; 6–4, 6–1	(Russia) Ivan Davydov	(Italy) Luigi Sorrentino (France) Corentin Denolly	(Bulgaria) Vasko Mladenov (Sweden) Christian Lindell (Slovenia) Nik Razboršek (Estonia) Kristjan Tamm
April 8	Tabarka, Tunisia; Clay; M15; Singles and Doubles Draws	(Sweden) Simon Freund (Sweden) Linus Frost; 5–7, 7–6^{(7–4)}, [10–8]	(Switzerland) Adrien Bossel (Switzerland) Mirko Martinez	(Italy) Luigi Sorrentino (France) Corentin Denolly	(Bulgaria) Vasko Mladenov (Sweden) Christian Lindell (Slovenia) Nik Razboršek (Estonia) Kristjan Tamm
April 8	Antalya, Turkey; Clay; M15; Singles and Doubles Draws	(Russia) Ronald Slobodchikov; 7–6^{(7–5)}, 3–6, 6–1	(Australia) Christopher O'Connell	(Germany) Louis Wessels (Czech Republic) Tomáš Macháč	(Turkey) Marsel İlhan (Czech Republic) David Poljak (Germany) Daniel Altmaier (Finland) Patrik Niklas-Salminen
April 8	Antalya, Turkey; Clay; M15; Singles and Doubles Draws	(Russia) Maxim Ratniuk (Russia) Alexander Shevchenko; 6–4, 6–3	(Germany) Luca Gelhardt (United States) Neel Rajesh	(Germany) Louis Wessels (Czech Republic) Tomáš Macháč	(Turkey) Marsel İlhan (Czech Republic) David Poljak (Germany) Daniel Altmaier (Finland) Patrik Niklas-Salminen
April 8	Sunrise, United States; Clay; M15; Singles and Doubles Draws	(Kazakhstan) Dmitry Popko; 6–3, 3–6, 6–4	(United States) Sebastian Korda	(United States) Alexander Ritschard (Colombia) Alejandro González	(United States) Harrison Adams (Switzerland) Sandro Ehrat (United States) Sekou Bangoura (Argentina) Juan Ignacio Galarza
April 8	Sunrise, United States; Clay; M15; Singles and Doubles Draws	(United States) Justin Butsch (United States) Alexander Ritschard; 3–6, 6–3, [10–2]	(Argentina) Maximiliano Estévez (Chile) Bastián Malla	(United States) Alexander Ritschard (Colombia) Alejandro González	(United States) Harrison Adams (Switzerland) Sandro Ehrat (United States) Sekou Bangoura (Argentina) Juan Ignacio Galarza
April 15	Pula, Italy; Clay; M25; Singles and Doubles Draws	(Sweden) Christian Lindell; 6–2, 6–0	(France) Hugo Gaston	(Czech Republic) Jan Šátral (Brazil) Wilson Leite	(Italy) Giovanni Fonio (Italy) Liam Caruana (Italy) Samuele Ramazzotti (Russia) Kirill Kivattsev
April 15	Pula, Italy; Clay; M25; Singles and Doubles Draws	(United States) Hunter Johnson (United States) Yates Johnson; 6–3, 6–7^{(2–7)}, [10–5]	(Romania) Victor Vlad Cornea (Romania) Alexandru Jecan	(Czech Republic) Jan Šátral (Brazil) Wilson Leite	(Italy) Giovanni Fonio (Italy) Liam Caruana (Italy) Samuele Ramazzotti (Russia) Kirill Kivattsev
April 15	Shymkent, Kazakhstan; Clay; M25; Singles and Doubles Draws	(Russia) Roman Safiullin; 7–5, 6–3	(Ukraine) Vladyslav Manafov	(Russia) Alen Avidzba (Russia) Aleksandr Vasilenko	(Russia) Artem Dubrivnyy (Italy) Fabrizio Ornago (Germany) Lucas Gerch (Kazakhstan) Andrey Golubev
April 15	Shymkent, Kazakhstan; Clay; M25; Singles and Doubles Draws	(Russia) Teymuraz Gabashvili (Belarus) Ivan Liutarevich; 6–4, 6–2	(India) Sidharth Rawat (India) Manish Sureshkumar	(Russia) Alen Avidzba (Russia) Aleksandr Vasilenko	(Russia) Artem Dubrivnyy (Italy) Fabrizio Ornago (Germany) Lucas Gerch (Kazakhstan) Andrey Golubev
April 15	Abuja, Nigeria; Hard; M25+H; Singles and Doubles Draws	(France) Tom Jomby; 6–1, 7–6^{(7–4)}	(Ukraine) Danylo Kalenichenko	(United States) Peter Kobelt (France) Dan Added	(Austria) Maximilian Neuchrist (Brazil) Gilbert Soares Klier Júnior (Brazil) João Pedro Sorgi (Burundi) Guy Orly Iradukunda
April 15	Abuja, Nigeria; Hard; M25+H; Singles and Doubles Draws	(France) Sadio Doumbia (France) Fabien Reboul; 6–4, 5–7, [10–6]	(France) Dan Added (Greece) Michail Pervolarakis	(United States) Peter Kobelt (France) Dan Added	(Austria) Maximilian Neuchrist (Brazil) Gilbert Soares Klier Júnior (Brazil) João Pedro Sorgi (Burundi) Guy Orly Iradukunda
April 15	Guayaquil, Ecuador; Clay; M15; Singles and Doubles Draws	(Ecuador) Antonio Cayetano March; 6–4, 6–4	(Hungary) Mátyás Füle	(Argentina) Maximiliano Estévez (United States) Justin Butsch	(Argentina) Marco Saffratti (Peru) Arklon Huertas del Pino (Ecuador) Juan Sebastián Zabala Vargas (Argentina) Fermín Tenti
April 15	Guayaquil, Ecuador; Clay; M15; Singles and Doubles Draws	(Argentina) Leonardo Aboian (Argentina) Maximiliano Estévez; 6–4, 7–6^{(10–8)}	(Hungary) Mátyás Füle (United States) Sebastian Murillo	(Argentina) Maximiliano Estévez (United States) Justin Butsch	(Argentina) Marco Saffratti (Peru) Arklon Huertas del Pino (Ecuador) Juan Sebastián Zabala Vargas (Argentina) Fermín Tenti
April 15	Cairo, Egypt; Clay; M15; Singles and Doubles Draws	(Egypt) Karim-Mohamed Maamoun; 6–4, 6–1	(Spain) Pol Toledo Bagué	(Czech Republic) Vít Kopřiva (France) Matthieu Perchicot	(Switzerland) Adam Moundir (Austria) Peter Goldsteiner (Belgium) Benjamin D'Hoe (Germany) Kai Wehnelt
April 15	Cairo, Egypt; Clay; M15; Singles and Doubles Draws	(Czech Republic) Vít Kopřiva (Czech Republic) Jaroslav Pospíšil; 7–6^{(10–8)}, 4–6, [10–6]	(Russia) Alexander Igoshin (Portugal) Bernardo Saraiva	(Czech Republic) Vít Kopřiva (France) Matthieu Perchicot	(Switzerland) Adam Moundir (Austria) Peter Goldsteiner (Belgium) Benjamin D'Hoe (Germany) Kai Wehnelt
April 15	Cancún, Mexico; Hard; M15; Singles and Doubles Draws	(France) Hugo Grenier; 2–6, 7–6^{(7–3)}, 6–2	(Italy) Lorenzo Frigerio	(United States) Evan Zhu (Belgium) Michael Geerts	(Australia) Cameron Green (Israel) Yshai Oliel (United States) Henry Craig (United States) Adam El Mihdawy
April 15	Cancún, Mexico; Hard; M15; Singles and Doubles Draws	(Guatemala) Wilfredo González (Ecuador) Diego Hidalgo; 6–4, 6–4	(France) Quentin Robert (United Kingdom) Isaac Stoute	(United States) Evan Zhu (Belgium) Michael Geerts	(Australia) Cameron Green (Israel) Yshai Oliel (United States) Henry Craig (United States) Adam El Mihdawy
April 15	Madrid, Spain; Clay; M15; Singles and Doubles Draws	(France) Corentin Denolly; 6–3, 6–2	(Switzerland) Johan Nikles	(Russia) Ivan Gakhov (Belgium) Jeroen Vanneste	(Argentina) Tomás Lipovšek Puches (Brazil) Rafael Matos (Brazil) Felipe Meligeni Alves (Brazil) Orlando Luz
April 15	Madrid, Spain; Clay; M15; Singles and Doubles Draws	(France) Corentin Denolly (Switzerland) Johan Nikles; 7–5, 5–7, [13–11]	(Argentina) Tomás Lipovšek Puches (Brazil) Felipe Meligeni Alves	(Russia) Ivan Gakhov (Belgium) Jeroen Vanneste	(Argentina) Tomás Lipovšek Puches (Brazil) Rafael Matos (Brazil) Felipe Meligeni Alves (Brazil) Orlando Luz
April 15	Tabarka, Tunisia; Clay; M15; Singles and Doubles Draws	(France) Maxime Hamou; 7–6^{(7–5)}, 6–4	(Spain) Javier Barranco Cosano	(Germany) Constantin Schmitz (Belgium) Maxime Pauwels	(Spain) Nikolás Sánchez Izquierdo (Slovenia) Nik Razboršek (Italy) Alessandro Coppini (Republic of Ireland) Simon Carr
April 15	Tabarka, Tunisia; Clay; M15; Singles and Doubles Draws	(Germany) Constantin Schmitz (France) Maxime Tchoutakian; 6–3, 6–2	(Argentina) Franco Emanuel Egea (Morocco) Anas Fattar	(Germany) Constantin Schmitz (Belgium) Maxime Pauwels	(Spain) Nikolás Sánchez Izquierdo (Slovenia) Nik Razboršek (Italy) Alessandro Coppini (Republic of Ireland) Simon Carr
April 15	Antalya, Turkey; Clay; M15; Singles and Doubles Draws	(Belgium) Christopher Heyman; 4–6, 6–3, 7–6^{(7–0)}	(Australia) Christopher O'Connell	(Russia) Alexander Shevchenko (Czech Republic) Tomáš Macháč	(Sweden) Karl Friberg (Russia) Bogdan Bobrov (Netherlands) Jesper de Jong (Serbia) Marko Miladinović
April 15	Antalya, Turkey; Clay; M15; Singles and Doubles Draws	(Russia) Bogdan Bobrov (Finland) Patrik Niklas-Salminen; 6–3, 6–3	(Czech Republic) Michal Konečný (Czech Republic) Tomáš Macháč	(Russia) Alexander Shevchenko (Czech Republic) Tomáš Macháč	(Sweden) Karl Friberg (Russia) Bogdan Bobrov (Netherlands) Jesper de Jong (Serbia) Marko Miladinović
April 15	Orange Park, United States; Clay; M15; Singles and Doubles Draws	(Kazakhstan) Dmitry Popko; 6–0, 5–7, 6–3	(Argentina) Agustín Velotti	(Brazil) Mateus Alves (Dominican Republic) José Olivares	(Slovenia) Matic Špec (United States) Alexander Ritschard (Bulgaria) Adrian Andreev (Venezuela) Ricardo Rodríguez
April 15	Orange Park, United States; Clay; M15; Singles and Doubles Draws	(Argentina) Juan Ignacio Galarza (Argentina) Agustín Velotti; 7–6^{(8–6)}, 6–7^{(3–7)}, [10–5]	(United States) Harrison Adams (United States) Junior Alexander Ore	(Brazil) Mateus Alves (Dominican Republic) José Olivares	(Slovenia) Matic Špec (United States) Alexander Ritschard (Bulgaria) Adrian Andreev (Venezuela) Ricardo Rodríguez
April 22	Angers, France; Clay (indoor); M25; Singles and Doubles Draws	(Spain) Nikolás Sánchez Izquierdo; 6–3, 7–6^{(7–2)}	(Belgium) Jeroen Vanneste	(Netherlands) Botic van de Zandschulp (France) Maxime Hamou	(Germany) Tobias Simon (France) Jules Okala (France) Antoine Cornut-Chauvinc (Switzerland) Johan Nikles
April 22	Angers, France; Clay (indoor); M25; Singles and Doubles Draws	(Netherlands) Botic van de Zandschulp (Belgium) Jeroen Vanneste; 6–4, 7–6^{(7–3)}	(France) Antoine Cornut-Chauvinc (France) Arthur Reymond	(Netherlands) Botic van de Zandschulp (France) Maxime Hamou	(Germany) Tobias Simon (France) Jules Okala (France) Antoine Cornut-Chauvinc (Switzerland) Johan Nikles
April 22	Pula, Italy; Clay; M25; Singles and Doubles Draws	(France) Hugo Gaston; 6–4, 2–6, 6–3	(Austria) David Pichler	(Italy) Alessandro Bega (Italy) Liam Caruana	(Romania) Victor Vlad Cornea (Romania) Alexandru Jecan (Argentina) Juan Pablo Ficovich (Germany) Mats Rosenkranz
April 22	Pula, Italy; Clay; M25; Singles and Doubles Draws	(Italy) Marco Bortolotti (Australia) Scott Puodziunas; 6–2, 6–4	(Croatia) Ivan Sabanov (Croatia) Matej Sabanov	(Italy) Alessandro Bega (Italy) Liam Caruana	(Romania) Victor Vlad Cornea (Romania) Alexandru Jecan (Argentina) Juan Pablo Ficovich (Germany) Mats Rosenkranz
April 22	Abuja, Nigeria; Hard; M25+H; Singles and Doubles Draws	(France) Dan Added; 7–5, 2–0, ret.	(France) Tom Jomby	(Sweden) Simon Yitbarek (Netherlands) Niels Lootsma	(France) Sadio Doumbia (Ukraine) Danylo Kalenichenko (Brazil) Gilbert Soares Klier Júnior (Brazil) João Pedro Sorgi
April 22	Abuja, Nigeria; Hard; M25+H; Singles and Doubles Draws	(France) Dan Added (Greece) Michail Pervolarakis; 6–4, 6–4	(India) Arjun Kadhe (India) Vijay Sundar Prashanth	(Sweden) Simon Yitbarek (Netherlands) Niels Lootsma	(France) Sadio Doumbia (Ukraine) Danylo Kalenichenko (Brazil) Gilbert Soares Klier Júnior (Brazil) João Pedro Sorgi
April 22	Andijan, Uzbekistan; Hard; M25; Singles and Doubles Draws	(Netherlands) Tim van Rijthoven; 6–3, 6–7^{(5–7)}, 6–3	(Russia) Konstantin Kravchuk	(Russia) Aleksandr Vasilenko (Ukraine) Vladyslav Manafov	(Russia) Roman Safiullin (India) Sidharth Rawat (Russia) Alexander Pavlioutchenkov (Uzbekistan) Khumoyun Sultanov
April 22	Andijan, Uzbekistan; Hard; M25; Singles and Doubles Draws	(Kazakhstan) Timur Khabibulin (Ukraine) Vladyslav Manafov; 7–5, 6–1	(Russia) Markos Kalovelonis (Kazakhstan) Grigoriy Lomakin	(Russia) Aleksandr Vasilenko (Ukraine) Vladyslav Manafov	(Russia) Roman Safiullin (India) Sidharth Rawat (Russia) Alexander Pavlioutchenkov (Uzbekistan) Khumoyun Sultanov
April 22	Bucaramanga, Colombia; Clay; M15; Singles and Doubles Draws	(Peru) Mauricio Echazú; 3–6, 6–3, 6–4	(Colombia) Nicolás Mejía	(Argentina) Maximiliano Estévez (Peru) Arklon Huertas del Pino	(Argentina) Ignacio Monzón (Peru) Conner Huertas del Pino (Peru) Jorge Panta (Chile) Michel Vernier
April 22	Bucaramanga, Colombia; Clay; M15; Singles and Doubles Draws	(Argentina) Leonardo Aboian (Argentina) Maximiliano Estévez; 7–6^{(7–1)}, 6–2	(Colombia) Juan Sebastián Gómez (Colombia) Andrés Urrea	(Argentina) Maximiliano Estévez (Peru) Arklon Huertas del Pino	(Argentina) Ignacio Monzón (Peru) Conner Huertas del Pino (Peru) Jorge Panta (Chile) Michel Vernier
April 22	Cairo, Egypt; Clay; M15; Singles and Doubles Draws	(Serbia) Marko Tepavac; 6–1, 6–1	(United States) Dennis Uspensky	(Switzerland) Adam Moundir (Czech Republic) Jaroslav Pospíšil	(Spain) Pol Toledo Bagué (France) Pierre Delage (Romania) Valentin Vanta (Czech Republic) Petr Hájek
April 22	Cairo, Egypt; Clay; M15; Singles and Doubles Draws	(Belgium) Arnaud Bovy (Belgium) Gauthier Onclin; 2–6, 6–4, [10–7]	(Russia) Alexander Igoshin (Portugal) Bernardo Saraiva	(Switzerland) Adam Moundir (Czech Republic) Jaroslav Pospíšil	(Spain) Pol Toledo Bagué (France) Pierre Delage (Romania) Valentin Vanta (Czech Republic) Petr Hájek
April 22	Cancún, Mexico; Hard; M15; Singles and Doubles Draws	(France) Hugo Grenier; 6–3, 6–2	(United States) Gage Brymer	(United States) Christian Langmo (Ecuador) Diego Hidalgo	(Japan) Naoki Nakagawa (Guatemala) Wilfredo González (Italy) Adelchi Virgili (Israel) Yshai Oliel
April 22	Cancún, Mexico; Hard; M15; Singles and Doubles Draws	(United Kingdom) Julian Cash (United States) George Goldhoff; 6–3, 6–7^{(8–10)}, [10–6]	(Republic of Ireland) Julian Bradley (United States) Austin Rapp	(United States) Christian Langmo (Ecuador) Diego Hidalgo	(Japan) Naoki Nakagawa (Guatemala) Wilfredo González (Italy) Adelchi Virgili (Israel) Yshai Oliel
April 22	Tabarka, Tunisia; Clay; M15; Singles and Doubles Draws	(France) Geoffrey Blancaneaux; 7–6^{(7–3)}, 6–4	(Brazil) Orlando Luz	(Spain) Pedro Vives Marcos (Brazil) Rafael Matos	(Argentina) Franco Emanuel Egea (Italy) Erik Crepaldi (France) Louis Tessa (Germany) Constantin Schmitz
April 22	Tabarka, Tunisia; Clay; M15; Singles and Doubles Draws	(Brazil) Orlando Luz (Brazil) Rafael Matos; 6–4, 7–5	(Italy) Erik Crepaldi (Serbia) Darko Jandrić	(Spain) Pedro Vives Marcos (Brazil) Rafael Matos	(Argentina) Franco Emanuel Egea (Italy) Erik Crepaldi (France) Louis Tessa (Germany) Constantin Schmitz
April 22	Antalya, Turkey; Clay; M15; Singles and Doubles Draws	(Australia) Christopher O'Connell; 2–6, 6–4, 6–1	(Czech Republic) Jonáš Forejtek	(Ukraine) Vladyslav Orlov (Belgium) Christopher Heyman	(Bulgaria) Dimitar Kuzmanov (Colombia) Eduardo Struvay (Russia) Bogdan Bobrov (Japan) Yuta Shimizu
April 22	Antalya, Turkey; Clay; M15; Singles and Doubles Draws	(Russia) Bogdan Bobrov (Finland) Patrik Niklas-Salminen; 6–2, 6–7^{(8–10)}, [10–7]	(Netherlands) Jesper de Jong (Netherlands) Sidané Pontjodikromo	(Ukraine) Vladyslav Orlov (Belgium) Christopher Heyman	(Bulgaria) Dimitar Kuzmanov (Colombia) Eduardo Struvay (Russia) Bogdan Bobrov (Japan) Yuta Shimizu
April 29	Pula, Italy; Clay; M25; Singles and Doubles Draws	(Germany) Peter Torebko; 6–3, 6–7^{(5–7)}, 6–4	(Italy) Emiliano Maggioli	(France) Jules Okala (Italy) Fabrizio Ornago	(Italy) Federico Iannaccone (Italy) Luca Tomasetto (Argentina) Juan Pablo Ficovich (Italy) Luca Prevosto
April 29	Pula, Italy; Clay; M25; Singles and Doubles Draws	(Peru) Alexander Merino (Argentina) Manuel Peña López; 3–6, 6–4, [10–0]	(Turkey) Tuna Altuna (India) Vijay Sundar Prashanth	(France) Jules Okala (Italy) Fabrizio Ornago	(Italy) Federico Iannaccone (Italy) Luca Tomasetto (Argentina) Juan Pablo Ficovich (Italy) Luca Prevosto
April 29	Vero Beach, United States; Clay; M25; Singles and Doubles Draws	(Kazakhstan) Dmitry Popko; 6–1, 7–6^{(7–1)}	(United States) Sekou Bangoura	(United States) Paul Oosterbaan (Ecuador) Diego Hidalgo	(Brazil) Pedro Sakamoto (Peru) Nicolás Álvarez (United States) Eliot Spizzirri (Argentina) Juan Ignacio Galarza
April 29	Vero Beach, United States; Clay; M25; Singles and Doubles Draws	(Italy) Lorenzo Frigerio (Italy) Adelchi Virgili; 6–4, 6–3	(Bolivia) Boris Arias (United States) Sekou Bangoura	(United States) Paul Oosterbaan (Ecuador) Diego Hidalgo	(Brazil) Pedro Sakamoto (Peru) Nicolás Álvarez (United States) Eliot Spizzirri (Argentina) Juan Ignacio Galarza
April 29	Namangan, Uzbekistan; Hard; M25; Singles and Doubles Draws	(Netherlands) Tim van Rijthoven; 6–7^{(5–7)}, 7–5, 6–4	(Russia) Roman Safiullin	(Kazakhstan) Timofei Skatov (Russia) Konstantin Kravchuk	(Russia) Evgenii Tiurnev (Israel) Edan Leshem (Russia) Aleksandr Vasilenko (Uzbekistan) Khumoyun Sultanov
April 29	Namangan, Uzbekistan; Hard; M25; Singles and Doubles Draws	(Russia) Roman Safiullin (Russia) Evgenii Tiurnev; 7–6^{(7–5)}, 6–3	(Uzbekistan) Sanjar Fayziev (Uzbekistan) Khumoyun Sultanov	(Kazakhstan) Timofei Skatov (Russia) Konstantin Kravchuk	(Russia) Evgenii Tiurnev (Israel) Edan Leshem (Russia) Aleksandr Vasilenko (Uzbekistan) Khumoyun Sultanov
April 29	Buenos Aires, Argentina; Clay; M15; Singles and Doubles Draws	(Argentina) Sebastián Báez; 6–4, 6–0	(Argentina) Agustín Velotti	(Argentina) Thiago Agustín Tirante (Argentina) Hernán Casanova	(Argentina) Francisco Cerúndolo (Argentina) Facundo Díaz Acosta (Argentina) Juan Manuel Cerúndolo (Argentina) Mariano Kestelboim
April 29	Buenos Aires, Argentina; Clay; M15; Singles and Doubles Draws	(Argentina) Tomás Martín Etcheverry (Argentina) Mariano Kestelboim; 4–6, 6–4, [10–3]	(Argentina) Maximiliano Estévez (Argentina) Agustín Velotti	(Argentina) Thiago Agustín Tirante (Argentina) Hernán Casanova	(Argentina) Francisco Cerúndolo (Argentina) Facundo Díaz Acosta (Argentina) Juan Manuel Cerúndolo (Argentina) Mariano Kestelboim
April 29	Wuhan, China; Hard; M15; Singles and Doubles Draws	(Japan) Shuichi Sekiguchi; 6–3, 6–0	(Japan) Sho Shimabukuro	(Chinese Taipei) Lee Kuan-yi (China) Sun Fajing	(Chinese Taipei) Chen Ti (Japan) Sora Fukuda (Japan) Yuki Mochizuki (China) Cui Jie
April 29	Wuhan, China; Hard; M15; Singles and Doubles Draws	(Japan) Sora Fukuda (Japan) Yuki Mochizuki; 6–7^{(5–7)}, 6–4, [10–8]	(Japan) Shuichi Sekiguchi (Japan) Sho Shimabukuro	(Chinese Taipei) Lee Kuan-yi (China) Sun Fajing	(Chinese Taipei) Chen Ti (Japan) Sora Fukuda (Japan) Yuki Mochizuki (China) Cui Jie
April 29	Cairo, Egypt; Clay; M15; Singles and Doubles Draws	(Spain) Albert Alcaraz Ivorra; 6–7^{(6–8)}, 6–4, 6–4	(Serbia) Marko Tepavac	(Switzerland) Adam Moundir (Poland) Adrian Andrzejczuk	(Belgium) Arnaud Bovy (Russia) Alexander Igoshin (Germany) Kai Wehnelt (France) Matthieu Perchicot
April 29	Cairo, Egypt; Clay; M15; Singles and Doubles Draws	(Russia) Alexander Igoshin (Portugal) Bernardo Saraiva; 4–6, 6–2, [10–4]	(South Korea) Jeong Yeong-seok (South Korea) Park Ui-sung	(Switzerland) Adam Moundir (Poland) Adrian Andrzejczuk	(Belgium) Arnaud Bovy (Russia) Alexander Igoshin (Germany) Kai Wehnelt (France) Matthieu Perchicot
April 29	Grasse, France; Clay; M15; Singles and Doubles Draws	(France) Maxime Hamou; 6–2, 6–3	(France) Corentin Denolly	(France) Yanais Laurent (Japan) Naoki Tajima	(Australia) Rinky Hijikata (France) Amaury Delmas (Russia) Kirill Kivattsev (France) Hugo Gaston
April 29	Grasse, France; Clay; M15; Singles and Doubles Draws	(France) Mick Lescure (Germany) Christoph Negritu; 6–2, 6–3	(France) Amaury Delmas (France) Corentin Denolly	(France) Yanais Laurent (Japan) Naoki Tajima	(Australia) Rinky Hijikata (France) Amaury Delmas (Russia) Kirill Kivattsev (France) Hugo Gaston
April 29	Tbilisi, Georgia; Hard; M15; Singles and Doubles Draws	(Czech Republic) Michal Konečný; 7–6^{(8–6)}, 7–5	(United Kingdom) Mark Whitehouse	(Turkey) Altuğ Çelikbilek (Republic of Ireland) Peter Bothwell	(Ukraine) Marat Deviatiarov (Georgia (country)) Aleksandre Metreveli (Russia) Markos Kalovelonis (Spain) John Echeverría
April 29	Tbilisi, Georgia; Hard; M15; Singles and Doubles Draws	(Czech Republic) Michal Konečný (Czech Republic) Ondřej Krstev; 6–3, 6–3	(Kazakhstan) Grigoriy Lomakin (Georgia (country)) George Tsivadze	(Turkey) Altuğ Çelikbilek (Republic of Ireland) Peter Bothwell	(Ukraine) Marat Deviatiarov (Georgia (country)) Aleksandre Metreveli (Russia) Markos Kalovelonis (Spain) John Echeverría
April 29	Accra, Ghana; Hard; M15; Singles and Doubles Draws	(United Kingdom) Ryan James Storrie; 6–4, 6–4	(Zimbabwe) Benjamin Lock	(Ukraine) Eric Vanshelboim (Zimbabwe) Mehluli Don Ayanda Sibanda	(United States) William Bushamuka (United States) Luke Jacob Gamble (Namibia) Tukhula Jacobs (Portugal) André Gaspar Murta
April 29	Accra, Ghana; Hard; M15; Singles and Doubles Draws	(Zimbabwe) Benjamin Lock (Zimbabwe) Courtney John Lock; 6–4, 6–1	(United Kingdom) Darryl Hale (Sweden) Niklas Johansson	(Ukraine) Eric Vanshelboim (Zimbabwe) Mehluli Don Ayanda Sibanda	(United States) William Bushamuka (United States) Luke Jacob Gamble (Namibia) Tukhula Jacobs (Portugal) André Gaspar Murta
April 29	Las Palmas, Spain; Clay; M15; Singles and Doubles Draws	(Spain) Eduard Esteve Lobato; 6–2, 6–3	(Brazil) Felipe Meligeni Alves	(Spain) Jaume Pla Malfeito (Brazil) Jordan Correia	(Spain) Carlos López Montagud (France) Alexandre Peyrot (United Kingdom) Luke Johnson (Italy) Alessandro Coppini
April 29	Las Palmas, Spain; Clay; M15; Singles and Doubles Draws	(United Kingdom) Luke Johnson (Brazil) Felipe Meligeni Alves; 6–1, 7–6^{(7–3)}	(Netherlands) Michiel de Krom (Spain) Jaume Pla Malfeito	(Spain) Jaume Pla Malfeito (Brazil) Jordan Correia	(Spain) Carlos López Montagud (France) Alexandre Peyrot (United Kingdom) Luke Johnson (Italy) Alessandro Coppini
April 29	Tabarka, Tunisia; Clay; M15; Singles and Doubles Draws	(Brazil) Rafael Matos; 7–5, 7–5	(Brazil) Orlando Luz	(Argentina) Franco Emanuel Egea (Spain) Pol Toledo Bagué	(Spain) Sergi Pérez Contri (Argentina) Franco Agamenone (Spain) Pedro Vives Marcos (Italy) Alessandro Ingarao
April 29	Tabarka, Tunisia; Clay; M15; Singles and Doubles Draws	(Brazil) Orlando Luz (Brazil) Rafael Matos; 6–4, 6–4	(Argentina) Franco Agamenone (Argentina) Franco Emanuel Egea	(Argentina) Franco Emanuel Egea (Spain) Pol Toledo Bagué	(Spain) Sergi Pérez Contri (Argentina) Franco Agamenone (Spain) Pedro Vives Marcos (Italy) Alessandro Ingarao
April 29	Antalya, Turkey; Clay; M15; Singles and Doubles Draws	(Russia) Ivan Nedelko; 6–3, 6–3	(Turkey) Ergi Kırkın	(Ukraine) Georgii Kravchenko (Ukraine) Vladyslav Orlov	(Turkey) Marsel İlhan (Germany) Mats Rosenkranz (Colombia) Eduardo Struvay (Russia) Bogdan Bobrov
April 29	Antalya, Turkey; Clay; M15; Singles and Doubles Draws	(Russia) Mikhail Korovin (Ukraine) Oleg Prihodko; 4–6, 6–3, [10–8]	(Netherlands) Marc Dijkhuizen (Netherlands) Mats Hermans	(Ukraine) Georgii Kravchenko (Ukraine) Vladyslav Orlov	(Turkey) Marsel İlhan (Germany) Mats Rosenkranz (Colombia) Eduardo Struvay (Russia) Bogdan Bobrov

=== May ===
Week of	Tournament	Winner	Runners-up	Semifinalists	Quarterfinalists
May 6	Prijedor, Bosnia and Herzegovina; Clay; M25; Singles and Doubles Draws	(Netherlands) Botic van de Zandschulp; 6–4, 6–4	(Romania) Vlad Andrei Dancu	(Bosnia and Herzegovina) Nerman Fatić (Colombia) Cristian Rodríguez	(Netherlands) Igor Sijsling (Austria) Gibril Diarra (Serbia) Marko Miladinović (Australia) Christopher O'Connell
May 6	Prijedor, Bosnia and Herzegovina; Clay; M25; Singles and Doubles Draws	(Netherlands) Igor Sijsling (Netherlands) Botic van de Zandschulp; 3–6, 6–3, [10–4]	(Montenegro) Ljubomir Čelebić (Bosnia and Herzegovina) Nerman Fatić	(Bosnia and Herzegovina) Nerman Fatić (Colombia) Cristian Rodríguez	(Netherlands) Igor Sijsling (Austria) Gibril Diarra (Serbia) Marko Miladinović (Australia) Christopher O'Connell
May 6	Wuhan, China; Hard; M25; Singles and Doubles Draws	(China) Bai Yan; 6–2, 6–4	(Japan) Shuichi Sekiguchi	(Chinese Taipei) Hsu Yu-hsiou (Thailand) Wishaya Trongcharoenchaikul	(China) Sun Fajing (China) He Yecong (United States) Tyler Lu (China) Zeng Shihong
May 6	Wuhan, China; Hard; M25; Singles and Doubles Draws	(China) Sun Fajing (China) Te Rigele; 6–1, 3–6, [12–10]	(Japan) Sora Fukuda (Japan) Yuki Mochizuki	(Chinese Taipei) Hsu Yu-hsiou (Thailand) Wishaya Trongcharoenchaikul	(China) Sun Fajing (China) He Yecong (United States) Tyler Lu (China) Zeng Shihong
May 6	Vercelli, Italy; Clay; M25; Singles and Doubles Draws	(France) Maxime Chazal; 2–6, 6–4, 7–5	(France) Corentin Denolly	(Italy) Erik Crepaldi (France) Maxime Tchoutakian	(Italy) Alessandro Petrone (Argentina) Franco Emanuel Egea (Italy) Filippo Moroni (France) Evan Furness
May 6	Vercelli, Italy; Clay; M25; Singles and Doubles Draws	(Italy) Marco Bortolotti (Australia) Scott Puodziunas; 6–2, 6–2	(United Kingdom) Toby Martin (Germany) Jakob Sude	(Italy) Erik Crepaldi (France) Maxime Tchoutakian	(Italy) Alessandro Petrone (Argentina) Franco Emanuel Egea (Italy) Filippo Moroni (France) Evan Furness
May 6	Pensacola, United States; Clay; M25; Singles and Doubles Draws	(Peru) Juan Pablo Varillas; 6–2, 6–4	(United States) Harrison Adams	(Colombia) Nicolás Mejía (United States) Felix Corwin	(Colombia) Felipe Mantilla (Dominican Republic) Nick Hardt (Dominican Republic) José Olivares (Colombia) Alejandro Gómez
May 6	Pensacola, United States; Clay; M25; Singles and Doubles Draws	(Colombia) Alejandro Gómez (United States) Junior Alexander Ore; 4–6, 7–6^{(7–4)}, [10–6]	(United States) Ian Dempster (United States) Korey Lovett	(Colombia) Nicolás Mejía (United States) Felix Corwin	(Colombia) Felipe Mantilla (Dominican Republic) Nick Hardt (Dominican Republic) José Olivares (Colombia) Alejandro Gómez
May 6	Buenos Aires, Argentina; Clay; M15; Singles and Doubles Draws	(Argentina) Francisco Cerúndolo; 7–6^{(7–2)}, 7–6^{(8–6)}	(Argentina) Genaro Alberto Olivieri	(Argentina) Sebastián Báez (Argentina) Tomás Martín Etcheverry	(Argentina) Gonzalo Villanueva (Argentina) Ignacio Carou (Argentina) Francisco Comesaña (Argentina) Alejo Vilaro
May 6	Buenos Aires, Argentina; Clay; M15; Singles and Doubles Draws	(Argentina) Maximiliano Estévez (Chile) Victor Nuñez; 6–0, 3–6, [10–5]	(Peru) Arklon Huertas del Pino (Peru) Conner Huertas del Pino	(Argentina) Sebastián Báez (Argentina) Tomás Martín Etcheverry	(Argentina) Gonzalo Villanueva (Argentina) Ignacio Carou (Argentina) Francisco Comesaña (Argentina) Alejo Vilaro
May 6	Sozopol, Bulgaria; Hard; M15; Singles and Doubles Draws	(Turkey) Altuğ Çelikbilek; 6–7^{(5–7)}, 6–3, 6–2	(Bulgaria) Alexander Donski	(Russia) Kristian Lozan (Russia) Shalva Dzahanshiya	(United States) Vasil Kirkov (Romania) Petru-Alexandru Luncanu (Bulgaria) Alexandar Lazarov (Ukraine) Nikita Mashtakov
May 6	Sozopol, Bulgaria; Hard; M15; Singles and Doubles Draws	(United States) Alec Adamson (United States) Vasil Kirkov; 4–6, 6–2, [10–6]	(Bulgaria) Alexander Donski (Bulgaria) Alexandar Lazarov	(Russia) Kristian Lozan (Russia) Shalva Dzahanshiya	(United States) Vasil Kirkov (Romania) Petru-Alexandru Luncanu (Bulgaria) Alexandar Lazarov (Ukraine) Nikita Mashtakov
May 6	Troisdorf, Germany; Clay; M15; Singles and Doubles Draws	(Poland) Kacper Żuk; 7–5, 6–1	(Belgium) Jeroen Vanneste	(Brazil) Oscar José Gutierrez (Germany) Constantin Schmitz	(Germany) Marvin Netuschil (Belgium) Michael Geerts (Netherlands) Daniel de Jonge (Serbia) Pavle Daljev
May 6	Troisdorf, Germany; Clay; M15; Singles and Doubles Draws	(Romania) Patrick Grigoriu (Germany) Christoph Negritu; 7–5, 5–7, [12–10]	(Germany) Mike Döring (Germany) Andreas Mies	(Brazil) Oscar José Gutierrez (Germany) Constantin Schmitz	(Germany) Marvin Netuschil (Belgium) Michael Geerts (Netherlands) Daniel de Jonge (Serbia) Pavle Daljev
May 6	Heraklion, Greece; Hard; M15; Singles and Doubles Draws	(Greece) Michail Pervolarakis; 6–2, 7–5	(United States) Henry Craig	(Austria) Jonas Trinker (Greece) Alexandros Skorilas	(United Kingdom) Lloyd Glasspool (Republic of Ireland) Peter Bothwell (Poland) Michał Dembek (United States) Dusty Boyer
May 6	Heraklion, Greece; Hard; M15; Singles and Doubles Draws	(United Kingdom) Lloyd Glasspool (United Kingdom) Aidan McHugh; 7–6^{(7–5)}, 7–6^{(7–2)}	(Greece) Michail Pervolarakis (Greece) Petros Tsitsipas	(Austria) Jonas Trinker (Greece) Alexandros Skorilas	(United Kingdom) Lloyd Glasspool (Republic of Ireland) Peter Bothwell (Poland) Michał Dembek (United States) Dusty Boyer
May 6	Cancún, Mexico; Hard; M15; Singles and Doubles Draws	(United Kingdom) Ryan Peniston; 6–4, 6–4	(United States) Austin Rapp	(United Kingdom) David Fox (Italy) Marco Brugnerotto	(United States) Gage Brymer (United States) Nicholas Bybel (United States) Christian Langmo (Costa Rica) Jesse Flores
May 6	Cancún, Mexico; Hard; M15; Singles and Doubles Draws	(Moldova) Alexander Cozbinov (United States) Austin Rapp; 6–2, 4–6, [10–1]	(United Kingdom) David Fox (United Kingdom) Isaac Stoute	(United Kingdom) David Fox (Italy) Marco Brugnerotto	(United States) Gage Brymer (United States) Nicholas Bybel (United States) Christian Langmo (Costa Rica) Jesse Flores
May 6	Piešťany, Slovakia; Clay; M15; Singles and Doubles Draws	(Russia) Artem Dubrivnyy; 3–6, 6–3, 6–2	(Switzerland) Raphael Baltensperger	(Hungary) Péter Nagy (Czech Republic) Marek Gengel	(Latvia) Mārtiņš Podžus (Poland) Wojciech Marek (Czech Republic) Filip Duda (Czech Republic) Tadeáš Paroulek
May 6	Piešťany, Slovakia; Clay; M15; Singles and Doubles Draws	(Hungary) Fábián Marozsán (Hungary) Péter Nagy; 7–6^{(7–2)}, 6–0	(Switzerland) Raphael Baltensperger (Russia) Matvey Khomentovskiy	(Hungary) Péter Nagy (Czech Republic) Marek Gengel	(Latvia) Mārtiņš Podžus (Poland) Wojciech Marek (Czech Republic) Filip Duda (Czech Republic) Tadeáš Paroulek
May 6	Las Palmas, Spain; Clay; M15; Singles and Doubles Draws	(Spain) Eduard Esteve Lobato; 6–4, 6–1	(Brazil) Felipe Meligeni Alves	(Spain) Carlos López Montagud (Brazil) Jordan Correia	(Belgium) Martin van der Meerschen (Spain) Pol Amoros Ramos (Russia) Andrey Chepelev (France) Jaimee Floyd Angele
May 6	Las Palmas, Spain; Clay; M15; Singles and Doubles Draws	(United Kingdom) Luke Johnson (Brazil) Felipe Meligeni Alves; 6–3, 6–7^{(3–7)}, [13–11]	(Netherlands) Michiel de Krom (Portugal) Francisco Dias	(Spain) Carlos López Montagud (Brazil) Jordan Correia	(Belgium) Martin van der Meerschen (Spain) Pol Amoros Ramos (Russia) Andrey Chepelev (France) Jaimee Floyd Angele
May 6	Karlskrona, Sweden; Clay; M15; Singles and Doubles Draws	(Sweden) Markus Eriksson; 6–4, 3–6, 6–1	(Russia) Ronald Slobodchikov	(Serbia) Goran Marković (Finland) Patrik Niklas-Salminen	(Sweden) Karl Friberg (Romania) George Botezan (Sweden) Gustav Hansson (Finland) Otto Virtanen
May 6	Karlskrona, Sweden; Clay; M15; Singles and Doubles Draws	(Sweden) Filip Bergevi (Sweden) Markus Eriksson; 6–1, 6–3	(United States) Justin Butsch (Sweden) Simon Freund	(Serbia) Goran Marković (Finland) Patrik Niklas-Salminen	(Sweden) Karl Friberg (Romania) George Botezan (Sweden) Gustav Hansson (Finland) Otto Virtanen
May 6	Tabarka, Tunisia; Clay; M15; Singles and Doubles Draws	(Romania) Filip Cristian Jianu; 6–2, 6–4	(France) Matthieu Perchicot	(Tunisia) Aziz Dougaz (Italy) Alessandro Ingarao	(Belgium) Tom Pisane (France) Pierre Delage (Tunisia) Anis Ghorbel (Bosnia and Herzegovina) Darko Bojanović
May 6	Tabarka, Tunisia; Clay; M15; Singles and Doubles Draws	(France) Lilian Marmousez (France) Clément Tabur; 3–6, 6–3, [10–8]	(Bosnia and Herzegovina) Darko Bojanović (Netherlands) Glenn Smits	(Tunisia) Aziz Dougaz (Italy) Alessandro Ingarao	(Belgium) Tom Pisane (France) Pierre Delage (Tunisia) Anis Ghorbel (Bosnia and Herzegovina) Darko Bojanović
May 6	Antalya, Turkey; Clay; M15; Singles and Doubles Draws	(Turkey) Ergi Kırkın; 6–3, 3–6, 6–4	(Russia) Denis Klok	(Georgia (country)) Aleksandre Metreveli (Netherlands) Max Houkes	(Ukraine) Vladyslav Orlov (Ukraine) Georgii Kravchenko (Poland) Piotr Gryńkowski (Romania) Victor Vlad Cornea
May 6	Antalya, Turkey; Clay; M15; Singles and Doubles Draws	(Romania) Victor Vlad Cornea (Romania) Alexandru Jecan; 6–0, 6–2	(Turkey) Umut Akkoyun (Turkey) Mert Alkaya	(Georgia (country)) Aleksandre Metreveli (Netherlands) Max Houkes	(Ukraine) Vladyslav Orlov (Ukraine) Georgii Kravchenko (Poland) Piotr Gryńkowski (Romania) Victor Vlad Cornea
May 6	Kampala, Uganda; Clay; M15; Singles and Doubles Draws	(Russia) Ivan Nedelko; 6–2, 6–4	(Republic of Ireland) Simon Carr	(Ukraine) Eric Vanshelboim (India) Muthu Aadhitiya Senthilkumar	(Lithuania) Julius Tverijonas (United Kingdom) Ryan James Storrie (Burundi) Guy Orly Iradukunda (India) S D Prajwal Dev
May 6	Kampala, Uganda; Clay; M15; Singles and Doubles Draws	(Burundi) Guy Orly Iradukunda (Kenya) Ismael Changawa Ruwa Mzai; 6–1, 7–5	(India) Kunal Anand (India) S D Prajwal Dev	(Ukraine) Eric Vanshelboim (India) Muthu Aadhitiya Senthilkumar	(Lithuania) Julius Tverijonas (United Kingdom) Ryan James Storrie (Burundi) Guy Orly Iradukunda (India) S D Prajwal Dev
May 13	Doboj, Bosnia and Herzegovina; Clay; M25; Singles and Doubles Draws	(Australia) Christopher O'Connell; 6–4, 7–6^{(7–1)}	(Netherlands) Botic van de Zandschulp	(Netherlands) Igor Sijsling (Bosnia and Herzegovina) Nerman Fatić	(Serbia) Milan Drinić (Russia) Artem Dubrivnyy (Argentina) Juan Pablo Ficovich (Argentina) Manuel Peña López
May 13	Doboj, Bosnia and Herzegovina; Clay; M25; Singles and Doubles Draws	(Germany) Elmar Ejupovic (Germany) Robert Strombachs; Walkover	(Montenegro) Ljubomir Čelebić (Bosnia and Herzegovina) Nerman Fatić	(Netherlands) Igor Sijsling (Bosnia and Herzegovina) Nerman Fatić	(Serbia) Milan Drinić (Russia) Artem Dubrivnyy (Argentina) Juan Pablo Ficovich (Argentina) Manuel Peña López
May 13	Lu'an, China; Hard; M25; Singles and Doubles Draws	(China) Sun Fajing; 7–5, 6–4	(China) Cui Jie	(Thailand) Wishaya Trongcharoenchaikul (China) He Yecong	(Japan) Takuto Niki (Chinese Taipei) Hsu Yu-hsiou (Hong Kong) Wong Hong-kit (China) Gao Xin
May 13	Lu'an, China; Hard; M25; Singles and Doubles Draws	(China) Wu Hao (China) Zeng Shihong; 7–6^{(8–6)}, 6–3	(China) Gao Qun (China) Yu Bingyu	(Thailand) Wishaya Trongcharoenchaikul (China) He Yecong	(Japan) Takuto Niki (Chinese Taipei) Hsu Yu-hsiou (Hong Kong) Wong Hong-kit (China) Gao Xin
May 13	Prague, Czech Republic; Clay; M15; Singles and Doubles Draws	(Czech Republic) Vít Kopřiva; 6–2, 6–3	(Czech Republic) Patrik Rikl	(Czech Republic) Michael Vrbenský (Czech Republic) Pavel Nejedlý	(Czech Republic) Dalibor Svrčina (France) Evan Furness (Czech Republic) Marek Gengel (Czech Republic) Michal Konečný
May 13	Prague, Czech Republic; Clay; M15; Singles and Doubles Draws	(Czech Republic) Filip Duda (Czech Republic) Marek Gengel; 6–1, 7–5	(Czech Republic) Vít Kopřiva (Czech Republic) Jaroslav Pospíšil	(Czech Republic) Michael Vrbenský (Czech Republic) Pavel Nejedlý	(Czech Republic) Dalibor Svrčina (France) Evan Furness (Czech Republic) Marek Gengel (Czech Republic) Michal Konečný
May 13	Heraklion, Greece; Hard; M15; Singles and Doubles Draws	(Israel) Yshai Oliel; 6–3, 6–4	(United Kingdom) Lloyd Glasspool	(Republic of Ireland) Peter Bothwell (Israel) Edan Leshem	(Australia) Aaron Addison (Ukraine) Pavel Shumeiko (Slovakia) Patrik Néma (Czech Republic) Marek Jaloviec
May 13	Heraklion, Greece; Hard; M15; Singles and Doubles Draws	(Czech Republic) Marek Jaloviec (Czech Republic) Robin Staněk; 6–4, 4–6, [10–5]	(United Kingdom) Brandon Murphy (United Kingdom) James Story	(Republic of Ireland) Peter Bothwell (Israel) Edan Leshem	(Australia) Aaron Addison (Ukraine) Pavel Shumeiko (Slovakia) Patrik Néma (Czech Republic) Marek Jaloviec
May 13	Casale Monferrato, Italy; Clay; M15; Singles and Doubles Draws	(Italy) Francesco Forti; Walkover	(Russia) Alen Avidzba	(Italy) Giovanni Fonio (Italy) Samuele Ramazzotti	(Italy) Mattia Frinzi (Switzerland) Riccardo Maiga (Germany) Pascal Meis (Italy) Federico Iannaccone
May 13	Casale Monferrato, Italy; Clay; M15; Singles and Doubles Draws	(Italy) Francesco Forti (Italy) Mattia Frinzi; 6–4, 6–4	(Ukraine) Marat Deviatiarov (Italy) Francesco Vilardo	(Italy) Giovanni Fonio (Italy) Samuele Ramazzotti	(Italy) Mattia Frinzi (Switzerland) Riccardo Maiga (Germany) Pascal Meis (Italy) Federico Iannaccone
May 13	Cancún, Mexico; Hard; M15; Singles and Doubles Draws	(United Kingdom) Ryan Peniston; 6–4, 7–5	(Argentina) Tomás Martín Etcheverry	(Australia) Matthew Romios (United States) Adam El Mihdawy	(United States) Gage Brymer (Guatemala) Wilfredo González (Italy) Marco Brugnerotto (Colombia) Alejandro Gómez
May 13	Cancún, Mexico; Hard; M15; Singles and Doubles Draws	(United States) George Goldhoff (United States) Austin Rapp; 6–3, 6–1	(Antigua and Barbuda) Jody Maginley (United States) Evan Zhu	(Australia) Matthew Romios (United States) Adam El Mihdawy	(United States) Gage Brymer (Guatemala) Wilfredo González (Italy) Marco Brugnerotto (Colombia) Alejandro Gómez
May 13	Valldoreix, Spain; Clay; M15; Singles and Doubles Draws	(Brazil) Orlando Luz; 6–3, 6–4	(Brazil) Rafael Matos	(Brazil) Felipe Meligeni Alves (Spain) Jordi Samper Montaña	(Spain) Oriol Roca Batalla (Spain) Nikolás Sánchez Izquierdo (Argentina) Facundo Díaz Acosta (Spain) Jaume Pla Malfeito
May 13	Valldoreix, Spain; Clay; M15; Singles and Doubles Draws	(Brazil) Felipe Meligeni Alves (Spain) Jaume Pla Malfeito; 1–6, 6–4, [11–9]	(Brazil) Orlando Luz (Brazil) Rafael Matos	(Brazil) Felipe Meligeni Alves (Spain) Jordi Samper Montaña	(Spain) Oriol Roca Batalla (Spain) Nikolás Sánchez Izquierdo (Argentina) Facundo Díaz Acosta (Spain) Jaume Pla Malfeito
May 13	Kalmar, Sweden; Clay; M15; Singles and Doubles Draws	(Sweden) Markus Eriksson; 6–2, 6–2	(Sweden) Dragoș Nicolae Mădăraș	(Russia) Ronald Slobodchikov (Sweden) Gustav Hansson	(Romania) George Botezan (France) Florian Lakat (Sweden) Karl Friberg (Netherlands) Bart Stevens
May 13	Kalmar, Sweden; Clay; M15; Singles and Doubles Draws	(Sweden) Filip Bergevi (Sweden) Markus Eriksson; 7–5, 6–2	(United States) Justin Butsch (Sweden) Simon Freund	(Russia) Ronald Slobodchikov (Sweden) Gustav Hansson	(Romania) George Botezan (France) Florian Lakat (Sweden) Karl Friberg (Netherlands) Bart Stevens
May 13	Tabarka, Tunisia; Clay; M15; Singles and Doubles Draws	(Tunisia) Aziz Dougaz; 6–4, 7–5	(France) Jules Okala	(France) Manuel Guinard (Italy) Luca Giacomini	(Argentina) Juan Ignacio Alcalde (Germany) Constantin Schmitz (France) Clément Tabur (Argentina) Mariano Kestelboim
May 13	Tabarka, Tunisia; Clay; M15; Singles and Doubles Draws	(France) Manuel Guinard (Argentina) Mariano Kestelboim; 6–4, 6–1	(Tunisia) Aziz Dougaz (Tunisia) Anis Ghorbel	(France) Manuel Guinard (Italy) Luca Giacomini	(Argentina) Juan Ignacio Alcalde (Germany) Constantin Schmitz (France) Clément Tabur (Argentina) Mariano Kestelboim
May 13	Antalya, Turkey; Clay; M15; Singles and Doubles Draws	(Bulgaria) Dimitar Kuzmanov; 3–6, 6–2, 6–1	(Ukraine) Oleg Prihodko	(Romania) Victor Vlad Cornea (Georgia (country)) Aleksandre Metreveli	(Turkey) Marsel İlhan (Russia) Vladimir Korolev (Argentina) Matías Zukas (Turkey) Koray Kırcı
May 13	Antalya, Turkey; Clay; M15; Singles and Doubles Draws	(Russia) Mikhail Korovin (Ukraine) Oleg Prihodko; 6–3, 5–7, [10–7]	(Turkey) Sarp Ağabigün (Kazakhstan) Grigoriy Lomakin	(Romania) Victor Vlad Cornea (Georgia (country)) Aleksandre Metreveli	(Turkey) Marsel İlhan (Russia) Vladimir Korolev (Argentina) Matías Zukas (Turkey) Koray Kırcı
May 13	Kampala, Uganda; Clay; M15; Singles and Doubles Draws	(Russia) Ivan Nedelko; 6–1, 6–4	(Lithuania) Julius Tverijonas	(Burundi) Guy Orly Iradukunda (Republic of Ireland) Simon Carr	(Ukraine) Eric Vanshelboim (India) Aryan Goveas (New Zealand) Ajeet Rai (India) Rishi Reddy
May 13	Kampala, Uganda; Clay; M15; Singles and Doubles Draws	(India) Anirudh Chandrasekar (India) Niki Kaliyanda Poonacha; 6–3, 6–4	(Republic of Ireland) Simon Carr (United Kingdom) Ryan James Storrie	(Burundi) Guy Orly Iradukunda (Republic of Ireland) Simon Carr	(Ukraine) Eric Vanshelboim (India) Aryan Goveas (New Zealand) Ajeet Rai (India) Rishi Reddy
May 20	Jablonec nad Nisou, Czech Republic; Clay; M25+H; Singles and Doubles Draws	(Czech Republic) Patrik Rikl; 7–6^{(7–3)}, 6–3	(Czech Republic) Jiří Lehečka	(Netherlands) Gijs Brouwer (Italy) Marco Bortolotti	(Slovakia) Lukáš Klein (France) Evan Furness (United States) Sekou Bangoura (Germany) Peter Torebko
May 20	Jablonec nad Nisou, Czech Republic; Clay; M25+H; Singles and Doubles Draws	(Czech Republic) Václav Šafránek (Czech Republic) Jan Šátral; 7–6^{(7–4)}, 0–6, [10–8]	(Croatia) Ivan Sabanov (Croatia) Matej Sabanov	(Netherlands) Gijs Brouwer (Italy) Marco Bortolotti	(Slovakia) Lukáš Klein (France) Evan Furness (United States) Sekou Bangoura (Germany) Peter Torebko
May 20	Vic, Spain; Clay; M25; Singles and Doubles Draws	(Italy) Raúl Brancaccio; 5–7, 7–5, 6–3	(Argentina) Facundo Díaz Acosta	(Spain) Oriol Roca Batalla (Portugal) Fred Gil	(Spain) Pol Toledo Bagué (Argentina) Hernán Casanova (Italy) Jacopo Berrettini (Russia) Ivan Gakhov
May 20	Vic, Spain; Clay; M25; Singles and Doubles Draws	(Brazil) Rafael Matos (Brazil) Felipe Meligeni Alves; 5–7, 6–4, [10–8]	(Spain) Javier Barranco Cosano (Italy) Raúl Brancaccio	(Spain) Oriol Roca Batalla (Portugal) Fred Gil	(Spain) Pol Toledo Bagué (Argentina) Hernán Casanova (Italy) Jacopo Berrettini (Russia) Ivan Gakhov
May 20	Nonthaburi, Thailand; Hard; M25; Singles and Doubles Draws	(Japan) Shuichi Sekiguchi; 6–1, 6–4	(South Korea) Nam Ji-sung	(Japan) Shintaro Imai (Australia) Harry Bourchier	(Uzbekistan) Khumoyun Sultanov (Thailand) Palaphoom Kovapitukted (Japan) Rio Noguchi (Canada) Kelsey Stevenson
May 20	Nonthaburi, Thailand; Hard; M25; Singles and Doubles Draws	(South Korea) Nam Ji-sung (South Korea) Song Min-kyu; 7–6^{(10–8)}, 6–1	(Thailand) Sanchai Ratiwatana (Thailand) Sonchat Ratiwatana	(Japan) Shintaro Imai (Australia) Harry Bourchier	(Uzbekistan) Khumoyun Sultanov (Thailand) Palaphoom Kovapitukted (Japan) Rio Noguchi (Canada) Kelsey Stevenson
May 20	Brčko, Bosnia and Herzegovina; Clay; M15; Singles and Doubles Draws	(Argentina) Juan Pablo Ficovich; 6–4, 6–4	(Australia) Christopher O'Connell	(Russia) Artem Dubrivnyy (Austria) David Pichler	(France) Pierre Faivre (Montenegro) Ljubomir Čelebić (Argentina) Francisco Cerúndolo (Argentina) Gonzalo Villanueva
May 20	Brčko, Bosnia and Herzegovina; Clay; M15; Singles and Doubles Draws	(Estonia) Daniil Glinka (Estonia) Kenneth Raisma; 6–4, 5–7, [10–3]	(France) Pierre Faivre (France) Maxime Tchoutakian	(Russia) Artem Dubrivnyy (Austria) David Pichler	(France) Pierre Faivre (Montenegro) Ljubomir Čelebić (Argentina) Francisco Cerúndolo (Argentina) Gonzalo Villanueva
May 20	Heraklion, Greece; Hard; M15; Singles and Doubles Draws	(United Kingdom) Evan Hoyt; 4–6, 7–6^{(7–2)}, 7–5	(Austria) Jonas Trinker	(Russia) Markos Kalovelonis (Turkey) Altuğ Çelikbilek	(Spain) Andrés Artuñedo (Republic of Ireland) Peter Bothwell (Bulgaria) Gabriel Donev (United States) Henry Craig
May 20	Heraklion, Greece; Hard; M15; Singles and Doubles Draws	(Republic of Ireland) Peter Bothwell (United States) Henry Craig; 4–6, 7–6^{(7–4)}, [10–4]	(Spain) Andrés Artuñedo (Spain) Pablo Vivero González	(Russia) Markos Kalovelonis (Turkey) Altuğ Çelikbilek	(Spain) Andrés Artuñedo (Republic of Ireland) Peter Bothwell (Bulgaria) Gabriel Donev (United States) Henry Craig
May 20	Cancún, Mexico; Hard; M15; Singles and Doubles Draws	(Croatia) Matija Pecotić; 6–2, 6–1	(Argentina) Camilo Ugo Carabelli	(Argentina) Tomás Martín Etcheverry (Colombia) Juan Sebastián Gómez	(United States) Martin Redlicki (Peru) Arklon Huertas del Pino (United States) Adam El Mihdawy (United Kingdom) Alexis Canter
May 20	Cancún, Mexico; Hard; M15; Singles and Doubles Draws	(Argentina) Tomás Martín Etcheverry (Argentina) Camilo Ugo Carabelli; 6–4, 6–3	(United States) Harrison Adams (United States) Jordi Arconada	(Argentina) Tomás Martín Etcheverry (Colombia) Juan Sebastián Gómez	(United States) Martin Redlicki (Peru) Arklon Huertas del Pino (United States) Adam El Mihdawy (United Kingdom) Alexis Canter
May 20	Bucharest, Romania; Clay; M15; Singles and Doubles Draws	(Spain) Albert Alcaraz Ivorra; 3–6, 6–4, 6–1	(Italy) Giovanni Fonio	(Brazil) Matheus Pucinelli de Almeida (Australia) Thomas Fancutt	(Bulgaria) Alexandar Lazarov (Russia) Alexander Igoshin (France) Maxime Chazal (Romania) Bogdan Ionuț Apostol
May 20	Bucharest, Romania; Clay; M15; Singles and Doubles Draws	(Russia) Alexander Igoshin (Slovenia) Tomás Lipovšek Puches; 2–6, 6–4, [10–8]	(Italy) Giovanni Fonio (Italy) Nicolò Turchetti	(Brazil) Matheus Pucinelli de Almeida (Australia) Thomas Fancutt	(Bulgaria) Alexandar Lazarov (Russia) Alexander Igoshin (France) Maxime Chazal (Romania) Bogdan Ionuț Apostol
May 20	Tabarka, Tunisia; Clay; M15; Singles and Doubles Draws	Tournament was cancelled after the completion of the quarterfinals due to ongoing poor weather		(Tunisia) Skander Mansouri (Argentina) Mariano Kestelboim (Tunisia) Aziz Dougaz (Argentina) Mateo Nicolás Martínez	(Spain) Imanol López Morillo (Venezuela) Ricardo Rodríguez (Poland) Michał Dembek (Italy) Luca Giacomini
May 20	Tabarka, Tunisia; Clay; M15; Singles and Doubles Draws	(Poland) Michał Dembek / (Switzerland) Mirko Martinez vs (Argentina) Mariano Kestelboim / (Argentina) Mateo Nicolás Martínez		(Tunisia) Skander Mansouri (Argentina) Mariano Kestelboim (Tunisia) Aziz Dougaz (Argentina) Mateo Nicolás Martínez	(Spain) Imanol López Morillo (Venezuela) Ricardo Rodríguez (Poland) Michał Dembek (Italy) Luca Giacomini
May 20	Antalya, Turkey; Clay; M15; Singles and Doubles Draws	(Belgium) Christopher Heyman; 6–4, 6–3	(Turkey) Ergi Kırkın	(Turkey) Koray Kırcı (Germany) Niklas Guttau	(Argentina) Matías Zukas (France) Jean Thirouin (Russia) Sergei Pogosian (Russia) Denis Klok
May 20	Antalya, Turkey; Clay; M15; Singles and Doubles Draws	(Russia) Denis Klok (Russia) Vladimir Korolev; 6–2, 3–6, [10–6]	(Turkey) Cengiz Aksu (Turkey) Mert Naci Türker	(Turkey) Koray Kırcı (Germany) Niklas Guttau	(Argentina) Matías Zukas (France) Jean Thirouin (Russia) Sergei Pogosian (Russia) Denis Klok
May 20	Kampala, Uganda; Clay; M15; Singles and Doubles Draws	(Russia) Ivan Nedelko; 6–3, 1–1, ret.	(Lebanon) Giovani Samaha	(India) Abhinav Sanjeev Shanmugam (Republic of Ireland) Simon Carr	(Zimbabwe) Mehluli Don Ayanda Sibanda (United States) William Bushamuka (India) Rishi Reddy (India) Niki Kaliyanda Poonacha
May 20	Kampala, Uganda; Clay; M15; Singles and Doubles Draws	(Republic of Ireland) Julian Bradley (Burundi) Guy Orly Iradukunda; 6–4, 3–6, [10–6]	(India) Anirudh Chandrasekar (India) Niki Kaliyanda Poonacha	(India) Abhinav Sanjeev Shanmugam (Republic of Ireland) Simon Carr	(Zimbabwe) Mehluli Don Ayanda Sibanda (United States) William Bushamuka (India) Rishi Reddy (India) Niki Kaliyanda Poonacha
May 20	Irpin, Ukraine; Clay; M15; Singles and Doubles Draws	(Ukraine) Artem Smirnov; 6–2, 6–3	(Ukraine) Vladyslav Orlov	(Kazakhstan) Denis Yevseyev (Ukraine) Oleg Dolgosheyev	(Sweden) Karl Friberg (Estonia) Kristjan Tamm (Ukraine) Nikita Mashtakov (Slovakia) Tomáš Líška
May 20	Irpin, Ukraine; Clay; M15; Singles and Doubles Draws	(Ukraine) Oleg Dolgosheyev (Ukraine) Dmytro Kamynin; 6–3, 7–5	(United Kingdom) Luke Johnson (Ukraine) Vladyslav Orlov	(Kazakhstan) Denis Yevseyev (Ukraine) Oleg Dolgosheyev	(Sweden) Karl Friberg (Estonia) Kristjan Tamm (Ukraine) Nikita Mashtakov (Slovakia) Tomáš Líška
May 27	Kiseljak, Bosnia and Herzegovina; Clay; M25; Singles and Doubles Draws	(Argentina) Francisco Cerúndolo; 3–6, 6–2, 6–4	(Australia) Christopher O'Connell	(Latvia) Mārtiņš Podžus (Argentina) Gonzalo Villanueva	(Slovenia) Nik Razboršek (Brazil) João Pedro Sorgi (Croatia) Alen Rogić Hadžalić (Bosnia and Herzegovina) Nerman Fatić
May 27	Kiseljak, Bosnia and Herzegovina; Clay; M25; Singles and Doubles Draws	(Latvia) Mārtiņš Podžus (Russia) Maxim Ratniuk; 7–6^{(7–5)}, 6–2	(Argentina) Francisco Cerúndolo (Brazil) João Pedro Sorgi	(Latvia) Mārtiņš Podžus (Argentina) Gonzalo Villanueva	(Slovenia) Nik Razboršek (Brazil) João Pedro Sorgi (Croatia) Alen Rogić Hadžalić (Bosnia and Herzegovina) Nerman Fatić
May 27	Luzhou, China; Hard; M25; Singles and Doubles Draws	(China) Bai Yan; 6–3, 6–2	(China) He Yecong	(China) Xia Zihao (China) Cui Jie	(China) Zheng Weiqiang (China) Gao Xin (China) Sun Fajing (Chinese Taipei) Yu Cheng-yu
May 27	Luzhou, China; Hard; M25; Singles and Doubles Draws	(China) Wang Aoran (China) Wu Hao; 3–6, 6–1, [10–5]	(China) Gao Xin (China) Sun Fajing	(China) Xia Zihao (China) Cui Jie	(China) Zheng Weiqiang (China) Gao Xin (China) Sun Fajing (Chinese Taipei) Yu Cheng-yu
May 27	Most, Czech Republic; Clay; M25+H; Singles and Doubles Draws	(France) Maxime Chazal; 5–7, 7–6^{(8–6)}, 7–5	(Czech Republic) Jan Šátral	(Germany) Julian Lenz (Northern Mariana Islands) Colin Sinclair	(Czech Republic) Václav Šafránek (France) Evan Furness (Czech Republic) Ondřej Krstev (France) Dan Added
May 27	Most, Czech Republic; Clay; M25+H; Singles and Doubles Draws	(Czech Republic) Tadeáš Paroulek (Czech Republic) Ondřej Štyler; 7–5, 6–1	(Czech Republic) Václav Šafránek (Czech Republic) Jan Šátral	(Germany) Julian Lenz (Northern Mariana Islands) Colin Sinclair	(Czech Republic) Václav Šafránek (France) Evan Furness (Czech Republic) Ondřej Krstev (France) Dan Added
May 27	Gyula, Hungary; Clay; M25; Singles and Doubles Draws	(Russia) Evgenii Tiurnev; 6–3, 6–3	(Sweden) Markus Eriksson	(Ukraine) Danylo Kalenichenko (Italy) Fabrizio Ornago	(France) Hugo Grenier (Czech Republic) Vít Kopřiva (Croatia) Matej Sabanov (Belgium) Christopher Heyman
May 27	Gyula, Hungary; Clay; M25; Singles and Doubles Draws	(Hungary) Gábor Borsos (Hungary) Fábián Marozsán; 7–6^{(9–7)}, 2–6, [12–10]	(Russia) Alexander Igoshin (Russia) Evgenii Tiurnev	(Ukraine) Danylo Kalenichenko (Italy) Fabrizio Ornago	(France) Hugo Grenier (Czech Republic) Vít Kopřiva (Croatia) Matej Sabanov (Belgium) Christopher Heyman
May 27	Bacău, Romania; Clay; M25+H; Singles and Doubles Draws	(France) Jules Okala; 4–6, 6–4, 6–3	(Argentina) Manuel Peña López	(Peru) Juan Pablo Varillas (Sweden) Dragoș Nicolae Mădăraș	(Romania) Călin Manda (Romania) Alexandru Jecan (Colombia) Eduardo Struvay (Chile) Alejandro Tabilo
May 27	Bacău, Romania; Clay; M25+H; Singles and Doubles Draws	(Chile) Alejandro Tabilo (Peru) Juan Pablo Varillas; 7–6^{(7–5)}, 7–6^{(7–4)}	(Peru) Alexander Merino (Argentina) Manuel Peña López	(Peru) Juan Pablo Varillas (Sweden) Dragoș Nicolae Mădăraș	(Romania) Călin Manda (Romania) Alexandru Jecan (Colombia) Eduardo Struvay (Chile) Alejandro Tabilo
May 27	Nonthaburi, Thailand; Hard; M25; Singles and Doubles Draws	(India) Sidharth Rawat; 7–5, 6–0	(Japan) Rio Noguchi	(Chinese Taipei) Hsu Yu-hsiou (Australia) Alexander Crnokrak	(Australia) Blake Ellis (India) Rishab Agarwal (Thailand) Congsup Congcar (Japan) Shuichi Sekiguchi
May 27	Nonthaburi, Thailand; Hard; M25; Singles and Doubles Draws	(Russia) Anton Chekhov (Uzbekistan) Khumoyun Sultanov; 5–7, 6–2, [10–2]	(Thailand) Sanchai Ratiwatana (Thailand) Sonchat Ratiwatana	(Chinese Taipei) Hsu Yu-hsiou (Australia) Alexander Crnokrak	(Australia) Blake Ellis (India) Rishab Agarwal (Thailand) Congsup Congcar (Japan) Shuichi Sekiguchi
May 27	Heraklion, Greece; Hard; M15; Singles and Doubles Draws	(Greece) Michail Pervolarakis; 6–1, 6–4	(United Kingdom) Aidan McHugh	(Finland) Emil Ruusuvuori (Greece) Markos Kalovelonis	(Italy) Erik Crepaldi (France) Loïc Ratsaratany (United States) Peter Kobelt (United States) Henry Craig
May 27	Heraklion, Greece; Hard; M15; Singles and Doubles Draws	(Spain) Andrés Artuñedo (Spain) Pablo Vivero González; 6–2, 6–2	(Australia) Thomas Fancutt (Australia) Calum Puttergill	(Finland) Emil Ruusuvuori (Greece) Markos Kalovelonis	(Italy) Erik Crepaldi (France) Loïc Ratsaratany (United States) Peter Kobelt (United States) Henry Craig
May 27	Reggio Emilia, Italy; Clay; M15; Singles and Doubles Draws	(Italy) Pietro Rondoni; 6–4, 6–4	(Italy) Andrea Guerrieri	(Switzerland) Riccardo Maiga (Italy) Lorenzo Frigerio	(Italy) Andrea Bolla (Russia) Ronald Slobodchikov (Russia) Savriyan Danilov (Italy) Gianluca Beghi
May 27	Reggio Emilia, Italy; Clay; M15; Singles and Doubles Draws	(Italy) Lorenzo Frigerio (Italy) Adelchi Virgili; 6–3, 6–3	(Italy) Fabrizio Andaloro (Italy) Riccardo Di Nocera	(Switzerland) Riccardo Maiga (Italy) Lorenzo Frigerio	(Italy) Andrea Bolla (Russia) Ronald Slobodchikov (Russia) Savriyan Danilov (Italy) Gianluca Beghi
May 27	Karuizawa, Japan; Clay; M15; Singles and Doubles Draws	(Japan) Yuki Mochizuki; 6–4, 4–6, 6–2	(Japan) Ko Suzuki	(Japan) Soichiro Moritani (Japan) Sora Fukuda	(Serbia) Goran Marković (Japan) Kento Takeuchi (Japan) Gengo Kikuchi (Japan) Haru Inoue
May 27	Karuizawa, Japan; Clay; M15; Singles and Doubles Draws	(Japan) Yuta Kawahashi (Japan) Soichiro Moritani; 4–6, 6–3, [11–9]	(Japan) Shohei Chikami (Japan) Yunosuke Tanaka	(Japan) Soichiro Moritani (Japan) Sora Fukuda	(Serbia) Goran Marković (Japan) Kento Takeuchi (Japan) Gengo Kikuchi (Japan) Haru Inoue
May 27	Cancún, Mexico; Hard; M15; Singles and Doubles Draws	(United States) Jordi Arconada; 7–5, 6–4	(Australia) Brandon Walkin	(Argentina) Camilo Ugo Carabelli (Colombia) Alejandro Gómez	(United States) Adam El Mihdawy (Peru) Conner Huertas del Pino (Colombia) Juan Sebastián Gómez (Argentina) Juan Pablo Grassi Mazzuchi
May 27	Cancún, Mexico; Hard; M15; Singles and Doubles Draws	(Australia) Matthew Romios (Australia) Brandon Walkin; 6–2, 2–6, [10–8]	(United States) Alexios Halebian (United States) Paul Oosterbaan	(Argentina) Camilo Ugo Carabelli (Colombia) Alejandro Gómez	(United States) Adam El Mihdawy (Peru) Conner Huertas del Pino (Colombia) Juan Sebastián Gómez (Argentina) Juan Pablo Grassi Mazzuchi
May 27	Singapore; Hard; M15; Singles and Doubles Draws	(Australia) Harry Bourchier; 6–2, 6–3	(United States) Maksim Tikhomirov	(Hong Kong) Wong Hong-kit (Japan) Ryota Tanuma	(United Kingdom) Jonathan Gray (United States) Alec Adamson (Japan) Kazuma Kawachi (India) Manish Sureshkumar
May 27	Singapore; Hard; M15; Singles and Doubles Draws	(Malaysia) Christian Didier Chin (Singapore) Ng Hao-yuan; 6–2, 6–7^{(3–7)}, [10–3]	(Japan) Kazuma Kawachi (Japan) Ryota Tanuma	(Hong Kong) Wong Hong-kit (Japan) Ryota Tanuma	(United Kingdom) Jonathan Gray (United States) Alec Adamson (Japan) Kazuma Kawachi (India) Manish Sureshkumar
May 27	Majadahonda, Spain; Clay; M15; Singles and Doubles Draws	(Spain) Pol Toledo Bagué; 6–2, 7–6^{(7–2)}	(Argentina) Facundo Díaz Acosta	(Bolivia) Federico Zeballos (Spain) Albert Roglan	(France) Florian Lakat (Portugal) Fred Gil (Spain) Jaume Pla Malfeito (Spain) Xavier Gabarró
May 27	Majadahonda, Spain; Clay; M15; Singles and Doubles Draws	(Netherlands) Jesper de Jong (Netherlands) Michiel de Krom; 6–3, 6–3	(Portugal) Fred Gil (France) Florian Lakat	(Bolivia) Federico Zeballos (Spain) Albert Roglan	(France) Florian Lakat (Portugal) Fred Gil (Spain) Jaume Pla Malfeito (Spain) Xavier Gabarró
May 27	Tabarka, Tunisia; Clay; M15; Singles and Doubles Draws	(Argentina) Mateo Nicolás Martínez; 6–2, 6–2	(Argentina) Genaro Alberto Olivieri	(Spain) Pedro Vives Marcos (France) Maxime Hamou	(Argentina) Mariano Kestelboim (Switzerland) Damien Wenger (Poland) Michał Dembek (Spain) Nikolás Sánchez Izquierdo
May 27	Tabarka, Tunisia; Clay; M15; Singles and Doubles Draws	(Argentina) Mariano Kestelboim (Argentina) Mateo Nicolás Martínez; 6–2, 6–2	(Argentina) Genaro Alberto Olivieri (Argentina) Matías Zukas	(Spain) Pedro Vives Marcos (France) Maxime Hamou	(Argentina) Mariano Kestelboim (Switzerland) Damien Wenger (Poland) Michał Dembek (Spain) Nikolás Sánchez Izquierdo
May 27	Irpin, Ukraine; Clay; M15; Singles and Doubles Draws	(Kazakhstan) Denis Yevseyev; 6–1, 6–3	(Belgium) Arnaud Bovy	(Russia) Bogdan Bobrov (Kazakhstan) Dostanbek Tashbulatov	(Ukraine) Oleg Prihodko (Russia) Yan Bondarevskiy (Sweden) Karl Friberg (Ukraine) Artem Smirnov
May 27	Irpin, Ukraine; Clay; M15; Singles and Doubles Draws	(Ukraine) Georgii Kravchenko (Ukraine) Oleg Prihodko; 6–3, 6–2	(Poland) Piotr Matuszewski (United States) Michael Zhu	(Russia) Bogdan Bobrov (Kazakhstan) Dostanbek Tashbulatov	(Ukraine) Oleg Prihodko (Russia) Yan Bondarevskiy (Sweden) Karl Friberg (Ukraine) Artem Smirnov

=== June ===
Week of	Tournament	Winner	Runners-up	Semifinalists	Quarterfinalists
June 3	Karlsruhe, Germany; Clay; M25; Singles and Doubles Draws	(Germany) Julian Lenz; 6–3, 6–7^{(3–7)}, 6–3	(Italy) Andrea Pellegrino	(Germany) Marvin Netuschil (France) Geoffrey Blancaneaux	(Argentina) Gonzalo Villanueva (Northern Mariana Islands) Colin Sinclair (South Africa) Ruan Roelofse (France) Manuel Guinard
June 3	Karlsruhe, Germany; Clay; M25; Singles and Doubles Draws	(Bolivia) Boris Arias (United States) Korey Lovett; 6–3, 7–6^{(7–4)}	(Peru) Alexander Merino (Argentina) Manuel Peña López	(Germany) Marvin Netuschil (France) Geoffrey Blancaneaux	(Argentina) Gonzalo Villanueva (Northern Mariana Islands) Colin Sinclair (South Africa) Ruan Roelofse (France) Manuel Guinard
June 3	Hong Kong; Hard; M25; Singles and Doubles Draws	(Japan) Shintaro Imai; 6–2, 6–1	(Japan) Shuichi Sekiguchi	(China) Bai Yan (Japan) Yuki Mochizuki	(Argentina) Agustín Velotti (Japan) Yuta Shimizu (Chinese Taipei) Tseng Chun-hsin (Japan) Yusuke Takahashi
June 3	Hong Kong; Hard; M25; Singles and Doubles Draws	(Japan) Shintaro Imai (Japan) Yuta Shimizu; 6–4, 6–4	(Australia) Blake Ellis (Vietnam) Lý Hoàng Nam	(China) Bai Yan (Japan) Yuki Mochizuki	(Argentina) Agustín Velotti (Japan) Yuta Shimizu (Chinese Taipei) Tseng Chun-hsin (Japan) Yusuke Takahashi
June 3	Plovdiv, Bulgaria; Clay; M15; Singles and Doubles Draws	(Sweden) Jonathan Mridha; 6–3, 6–3	(Chile) Bastián Malla	(Bulgaria) Dimitar Kuzmanov (France) Baptiste Crepatte	(Ukraine) Vladyslav Orlov (Brazil) Gilbert Klier Júnior (France) Lucas Poullain (Russia) Evgenii Tiurnev
June 3	Plovdiv, Bulgaria; Clay; M15; Singles and Doubles Draws	(Russia) Alexander Igoshin (Russia) Evgenii Tiurnev; 6–1, 6–7^{(9–11)}, [10–5]	(Bulgaria) Alexander Donski (Bulgaria) Simon Anthony Ivanov	(Bulgaria) Dimitar Kuzmanov (France) Baptiste Crepatte	(Ukraine) Vladyslav Orlov (Brazil) Gilbert Klier Júnior (France) Lucas Poullain (Russia) Evgenii Tiurnev
June 3	Tuam, Guam; Hard; M15; Singles and Doubles Draws	(Japan) Gengo Kikuchi; 6–2, 6–2	(Japan) Hiroyasu Ehara	(Japan) Kento Takeuchi (Japan) Ko Suzuki	(Spain) Jordi Samper Montaña (France) Hugo Pontico (Japan) Soichiro Moritani (Japan) Sho Katayama
June 3	Tuam, Guam; Hard; M15; Singles and Doubles Draws	(Japan) Gengo Kikuchi (Japan) Ko Suzuki; 7–6^{(8–6)}, 4–6, [10–3]	(Thailand) Palaphoom Kovapitukted (India) Karunuday Singh	(Japan) Kento Takeuchi (Japan) Ko Suzuki	(Spain) Jordi Samper Montaña (France) Hugo Pontico (Japan) Soichiro Moritani (Japan) Sho Katayama
June 3	Cancún, Mexico; Hard; M15; Singles and Doubles Draws	(Mexico) Gerardo López Villaseñor; 6–1, 6–1	(United States) Connor Farren	(United States) Adam El Mihdawy (Dominican Republic) Nick Hardt	(Lebanon) Hady Habib (United Kingdom) Isaac Stoute (Australia) Brandon Walkin (United States) Errol Smith
June 3	Cancún, Mexico; Hard; M15; Singles and Doubles Draws	(Peru) Arklon Huertas del Pino (Peru) Conner Huertas del Pino; 7–5, 6–4	(United Kingdom) Finn Bass (Argentina) Juan Pablo Grassi Mazzuchi	(United States) Adam El Mihdawy (Dominican Republic) Nick Hardt	(Lebanon) Hady Habib (United Kingdom) Isaac Stoute (Australia) Brandon Walkin (United States) Errol Smith
June 3	Singapore; Hard; M15; Singles and Doubles Draws	(Australia) Dayne Kelly; 6–3, 6–0	(United Kingdom) Aidan McHugh	(United Kingdom) Jonathan Gray (United States) Alec Adamson	(Japan) Ryota Tanuma (India) Manish Sureshkumar (India) Kunal Anand (Australia) Harry Bourchier
June 3	Singapore; Hard; M15; Singles and Doubles Draws	(United Kingdom) Jonathan Gray (Indonesia) David Agung Susanto; 7–5, 4–6, [10–6]	(Japan) Kazuma Kawachi (Japan) Kazuki Nishiwaki	(United Kingdom) Jonathan Gray (United States) Alec Adamson	(Japan) Ryota Tanuma (India) Manish Sureshkumar (India) Kunal Anand (Australia) Harry Bourchier
June 3	Daegu, South Korea; Hard; M15; Singles and Doubles Draws	(South Korea) Hong Seong-chan; 6–0, 6–3	(South Korea) Na Jung-woong	(South Korea) Kim Cheong-eui (South Korea) Oh Seong-gook	(Japan) Sora Fukuda (South Korea) Park Ui-sung (South Korea) Kim Young-seok (Australia) Thomas Fancutt
June 3	Daegu, South Korea; Hard; M15; Singles and Doubles Draws	(South Korea) Lim Yong-kyu (South Korea) Song Min-kyu; 6–3, 7–5	(Japan) Takuto Niki (Japan) Issei Okamura	(South Korea) Kim Cheong-eui (South Korea) Oh Seong-gook	(Japan) Sora Fukuda (South Korea) Park Ui-sung (South Korea) Kim Young-seok (Australia) Thomas Fancutt
June 3	Tabarka, Tunisia; Clay; M15; Singles and Doubles Draws	(Spain) Nikolás Sánchez Izquierdo; 3–6, 6–4, 6–4	(Argentina) Genaro Alberto Olivieri	(Argentina) Sebastián Báez (Brazil) João Pedro Sorgi	(France) Antoine Escoffier (Spain) Pedro Vives Marcos (Italy) Emiliano Maggioli (France) Hugo Grenier
June 3	Tabarka, Tunisia; Clay; M15; Singles and Doubles Draws	(Argentina) Nicolás Bianchi (Argentina) Genaro Alberto Olivieri; 6–4, 5–7, [10–4]	(Argentina) Sebastián Báez (Spain) Nikolás Sánchez Izquierdo	(Argentina) Sebastián Báez (Brazil) João Pedro Sorgi	(France) Antoine Escoffier (Spain) Pedro Vives Marcos (Italy) Emiliano Maggioli (France) Hugo Grenier
June 3	Champaign, United States; Hard; M15; Singles and Doubles Draws	(United States) Nathan Ponwith; 7–6^{(7–2)}, 6–4	(United States) Strong Kirchheimer	(Ecuador) Diego Hidalgo (United States) Sumit Sarkar	(United States) Tom Fawcett (United States) Vuk Budic (United States) Trent Bryde (United States) Ezekiel Clark
June 3	Champaign, United States; Hard; M15; Singles and Doubles Draws	(Brazil) Alex Blumenberg (United Kingdom) Mark Whitehouse; 3–6, 6–4, [10–6]	(Ecuador) Diego Hidalgo (Venezuela) Ricardo Rodríguez	(Ecuador) Diego Hidalgo (United States) Sumit Sarkar	(United States) Tom Fawcett (United States) Vuk Budic (United States) Trent Bryde (United States) Ezekiel Clark
June 10	Shenzhen, China; Hard; M25; Singles and Doubles Draws	(China) Bai Yan; 6–4, 6–1	(France) Laurent Rochette	(Chinese Taipei) Hsu Yu-hsiou (China) Mo Yecong	(China) Cui Jie (Switzerland) Luca Castelnuovo (China) He Yecong (China) Li Yuanfeng
June 10	Shenzhen, China; Hard; M25; Singles and Doubles Draws	(New Zealand) Rhett Purcell (China) Wang Aoran; 6–3, 7–5	(China) Gao Qun (China) Wang Ruikai	(Chinese Taipei) Hsu Yu-hsiou (China) Mo Yecong	(China) Cui Jie (Switzerland) Luca Castelnuovo (China) He Yecong (China) Li Yuanfeng
June 10	Hong Kong; Hard; M25; Singles and Doubles Draws	(Argentina) Agustín Velotti; 6–3, 6–3	(Japan) Shintaro Imai	(India) Sidharth Rawat (Chinese Taipei) Tseng Chun-hsin	(Japan) Yuki Mochizuki (Vietnam) Lý Hoàng Nam (China) Gao Xin (Japan) Yusuke Takahashi
June 10	Hong Kong; Hard; M25; Singles and Doubles Draws	(Thailand) Sanchai Ratiwatana (Thailand) Sonchat Ratiwatana; 6–3, 4–6, [10–8]	(China) Gao Xin (Hong Kong) Yeung Pak-long	(India) Sidharth Rawat (Chinese Taipei) Tseng Chun-hsin	(Japan) Yuki Mochizuki (Vietnam) Lý Hoàng Nam (China) Gao Xin (Japan) Yusuke Takahashi
June 10	Huelva, Spain; Clay; M25; Singles and Doubles Draws	(Brazil) Pedro Sakamoto; 6–2, 2–6, 7–6^{(7–2)}	(Chile) Bastián Malla	(Peru) Juan Pablo Varillas (Spain) Pol Martín Tiffon	(Belgium) Jeroen Vanneste (Brazil) Bruno Sant'Anna (Germany) Tobias Simon (France) Jules Okala
June 10	Huelva, Spain; Clay; M25; Singles and Doubles Draws	(Peru) Sergio Galdós (Peru) Juan Pablo Varillas; 6–2, 6–4	(Poland) Mateusz Kowalczyk (Poland) Maciej Smoła	(Peru) Juan Pablo Varillas (Spain) Pol Martín Tiffon	(Belgium) Jeroen Vanneste (Brazil) Bruno Sant'Anna (Germany) Tobias Simon (France) Jules Okala
June 10	Wichita, United States; Hard; M25; Singles and Doubles Draws	(United States) Sam Riffice; 6–1, 6–4	(United States) Brandon Holt	(United States) Evan Zhu (United States) Alexander Ritschard	(United States) Jacob Dunbar (United States) Oliver Crawford (United States) Jordi Arconada (United States) Sumit Sarkar
June 10	Wichita, United States; Hard; M25; Singles and Doubles Draws	(Moldova) Alexander Cozbinov (United States) Brandon Holt; 7–6^{(7–5)}, 6–3	(United States) Jacob Dunbar (United Kingdom) David Fox	(United States) Evan Zhu (United States) Alexander Ritschard	(United States) Jacob Dunbar (United States) Oliver Crawford (United States) Jordi Arconada (United States) Sumit Sarkar
June 10	Kaltenkirchen, Germany; Clay; M15; Singles and Doubles Draws	(Germany) Daniel Altmaier; 6–1, 6–3	(Sweden) Christian Lindell	(Sweden) Markus Eriksson (Switzerland) Damien Wenger	(Germany) Cedrik-Marcel Stebe (Austria) Alexander Erler (Argentina) Thiago Agustín Tirante (Turkey) Altuğ Çelikbilek
June 10	Kaltenkirchen, Germany; Clay; M15; Singles and Doubles Draws	(Brazil) Daniel Dutra da Silva (Sweden) Christian Lindell; 6–3, 6–0	(Czech Republic) Petr Nouza (Czech Republic) Michael Vrbenský	(Sweden) Markus Eriksson (Switzerland) Damien Wenger	(Germany) Cedrik-Marcel Stebe (Austria) Alexander Erler (Argentina) Thiago Agustín Tirante (Turkey) Altuğ Çelikbilek
June 10	Akko, Israel; Hard; M15; Singles and Doubles Draws	(Brazil) Gilbert Klier Júnior; 4–6, 6–4, 6–1	(Israel) Yshai Oliel	(Russia) Alexander Igoshin (Israel) Igor Smilansky	(Russia) Evgenii Tiurnev (United States) Peter Kobelt (Italy) Erik Crepaldi (Zimbabwe) Benjamin Lock
June 10	Akko, Israel; Hard; M15; Singles and Doubles Draws	(Greece) Markos Kalovelonis (Greece) Michail Pervolarakis; 6–7^{(9–11)}, 6–4, [10–6]	(Republic of Ireland) Julian Bradley (France) Florian Lakat	(Russia) Alexander Igoshin (Israel) Igor Smilansky	(Russia) Evgenii Tiurnev (United States) Peter Kobelt (Italy) Erik Crepaldi (Zimbabwe) Benjamin Lock
June 10	Akishima, Japan; Carpet; M15; Singles and Doubles Draws	(Japan) Yuta Kawahashi; 5–7, 7–5, 7–6^{(7–0)}	(Japan) Yuta Kikuchi	(Japan) Rio Noguchi (Japan) Ryohei Tagata	(Japan) Keisuke Saitoh (Japan) Kazuma Kawachi (Japan) Sho Katayama (Japan) Hikaru Shiraishi
June 10	Akishima, Japan; Carpet; M15; Singles and Doubles Draws	(Japan) Hiroyasu Ehara (Japan) Sho Katayama; 6–3, 6–4	(Japan) Rio Noguchi (Japan) Yunosuke Tanaka	(Japan) Rio Noguchi (Japan) Ryohei Tagata	(Japan) Keisuke Saitoh (Japan) Kazuma Kawachi (Japan) Sho Katayama (Japan) Hikaru Shiraishi
June 10	Cancún, Mexico; Hard; M15; Singles and Doubles Draws	(Mexico) Gerardo López Villaseñor; 7–6^{(7–2)}, 6–4	(Lebanon) Hady Habib	(Australia) Brandon Walkin (United States) Christian Langmo	(United States) Connor Farren (Bolivia) Alejandro Mendoza (Brazil) Eduardo Ribeiro (Peru) Jorge Panta
June 10	Cancún, Mexico; Hard; M15; Singles and Doubles Draws	(Peru) Arklon Huertas del Pino (Peru) Conner Huertas del Pino; 6–4, 7–6^{(7–3)}	(United States) George Goldhoff (United States) Austin Rapp	(Australia) Brandon Walkin (United States) Christian Langmo	(United States) Connor Farren (Bolivia) Alejandro Mendoza (Brazil) Eduardo Ribeiro (Peru) Jorge Panta
June 10	Singapore; Hard; M15; Singles and Doubles Draws	(United Kingdom) Aidan McHugh; 6–2, 6–2	(United Kingdom) Jonathan Gray	(India) Manish Sureshkumar (Japan) Kazuki Nishiwaki	(United States) Alec Adamson (Malaysia) Christian Didier Chin (Canada) Kelsey Stevenson (Australia) Benard Bruno Nkomba
June 10	Singapore; Hard; M15; Singles and Doubles Draws	(Australia) Aaron Addison (Australia) Cameron Green; 6–4, 6–4	(Thailand) Congsup Congcar (Japan) Kazuki Nishiwaki	(India) Manish Sureshkumar (Japan) Kazuki Nishiwaki	(United States) Alec Adamson (Malaysia) Christian Didier Chin (Canada) Kelsey Stevenson (Australia) Benard Bruno Nkomba
June 10	Gimcheon, South Korea; Hard; M15; Singles and Doubles Draws	(Japan) Yuta Shimizu; 6–2, 6–0	(France) Jean Thirouin	(South Korea) Lim Yong-kyu (Australia) Thomas Fancutt	(South Korea) Hong Seong-chan (South Korea) Song Min-kyu (South Korea) Park Sung-jun (South Korea) Han Seon-yong
June 10	Gimcheon, South Korea; Hard; M15; Singles and Doubles Draws	(South Korea) Choi Jae-won (South Korea) Moon Ju-hae; 7–6^{(7–4)}, 6–3	(Australia) Thomas Fancutt (Thailand) Chanchai Sookton-Eng	(South Korea) Lim Yong-kyu (Australia) Thomas Fancutt	(South Korea) Hong Seong-chan (South Korea) Song Min-kyu (South Korea) Park Sung-jun (South Korea) Han Seon-yong
June 10	Tabarka, Tunisia; Clay; M15; Singles and Doubles Draws	(Argentina) Juan Manuel Cerúndolo; 6–4, 7–6^{(8–6)}	(France) Antoine Escoffier	(Argentina) Genaro Alberto Olivieri (Brazil) João Pedro Sorgi	(Russia) Andrey Chepelev (France) Matthieu Perchicot (United Kingdom) Toby Martin (Belgium) Simon Beaupain
June 10	Tabarka, Tunisia; Clay; M15; Singles and Doubles Draws	(United States) Toby Boyer (Tunisia) Majed Kilani; 6–4, 1–1, ret.	(Netherlands) Michiel de Krom (Tunisia) Anis Ghorbel	(Argentina) Genaro Alberto Olivieri (Brazil) João Pedro Sorgi	(Russia) Andrey Chepelev (France) Matthieu Perchicot (United Kingdom) Toby Martin (Belgium) Simon Beaupain
June 17	Hengyang, China; Hard; M25; Singles and Doubles Draws	(Australia) Harry Bourchier; 7–6^{(9–7)}, 6–1	(China) Sun Fajing	(Chinese Taipei) Huang Tsung-hao (Japan) Rio Noguchi	(Chinese Taipei) Lo Chien-hsun (United States) Garrett Johns (Japan) Shintaro Imai (China) Bai Yan
June 17	Hengyang, China; Hard; M25; Singles and Doubles Draws	(Chinese Taipei) Huang Tsung-hao (Chinese Taipei) Lin Wei-de; 6–0, 6–7^{(6–8)}, [10–8]	(China) Wang Ruikai (China) Zhou Shenghao	(Chinese Taipei) Huang Tsung-hao (Japan) Rio Noguchi	(Chinese Taipei) Lo Chien-hsun (United States) Garrett Johns (Japan) Shintaro Imai (China) Bai Yan
June 17	Toulouse, France; Clay; M25+H; Singles and Doubles Draws	(France) Benjamin Bonzi; 6–4, 6–4	(France) Hugo Gaston	(France) Maxime Chazal (France) Grégoire Jacq	(France) Dan Added (Italy) Giovanni Fonio (France) Alexis Gautier (France) Laurent Lokoli
June 17	Toulouse, France; Clay; M25+H; Singles and Doubles Draws	(France) Benjamin Bonzi (France) Grégoire Jacq; 2–6, 6–2, [10–4]	(France) Jonathan Kanar (France) Laurent Lokoli	(France) Maxime Chazal (France) Grégoire Jacq	(France) Dan Added (Italy) Giovanni Fonio (France) Alexis Gautier (France) Laurent Lokoli
June 17	Martos, Spain; Hard; M25; Singles and Doubles Draws	(Colombia) Eduardo Struvay; 6–3, 6–2	(United States) Kevin King	(Spain) Carlos Alcaraz (Belgium) Yannick Mertens	(Spain) Benjamín Winter López (France) Mick Lescure (United States) Sumit Sarkar (Sweden) Jonathan Mridha
June 17	Martos, Spain; Hard; M25; Singles and Doubles Draws	(Spain) Jaume Pla Malfeito (Colombia) Eduardo Struvay; 4–6, 6–3, [10–7]	(Germany) Fabian Fallert (Germany) Hendrik Jebens	(Spain) Carlos Alcaraz (Belgium) Yannick Mertens	(Spain) Benjamín Winter López (France) Mick Lescure (United States) Sumit Sarkar (Sweden) Jonathan Mridha
June 17	Tulsa, United States; Hard; M25; Singles and Doubles Draws	(United States) Maxime Cressy; 6–3, 6–1	(United States) Sam Riffice	(United States) Martin Redlicki (United States) Ezekiel Clark	(United States) John McNally (Netherlands) Gijs Brouwer (United States) Alexander Sarkissian (United States) Nick Chappell
June 17	Tulsa, United States; Hard; M25; Singles and Doubles Draws	(United States) Maxime Cressy (Portugal) Bernardo Saraiva; 6–2, 3–6, [10–8]	(United States) Martin Redlicki (United States) Evan Zhu	(United States) Martin Redlicki (United States) Ezekiel Clark	(United States) John McNally (Netherlands) Gijs Brouwer (United States) Alexander Sarkissian (United States) Nick Chappell
June 17	São José do Rio Preto, Brazil; Clay; M15; Singles and Doubles Draws	(Argentina) Juan Pablo Ficovich; 6–4, 6–2	(Brazil) Rafael Matos	(Brazil) Felipe Meligeni Alves (Brazil) Oscar José Gutierrez	(Brazil) Christian Oliveira (Brazil) Alex Blumenberg (Brazil) Gabriel Ciro da Silva (Argentina) Hernán Casanova
June 17	São José do Rio Preto, Brazil; Clay; M15; Singles and Doubles Draws	(Brazil) Oscar José Gutierrez (Brazil) Felipe Meligeni Alves; 6–4, 3–6, [10–3]	(Brazil) Mateus Alves (Brazil) Christian Oliveira	(Brazil) Felipe Meligeni Alves (Brazil) Oscar José Gutierrez	(Brazil) Christian Oliveira (Brazil) Alex Blumenberg (Brazil) Gabriel Ciro da Silva (Argentina) Hernán Casanova
June 17	Balatonalmádi, Hungary; Clay; M15; Singles and Doubles Draws	(Australia) Christopher O'Connell; 6–3, 6–1	(Hungary) Gergely Madarász	(Russia) Artem Dubrivnyy (Argentina) Mariano Kestelboim	(Belgium) Zizou Bergs (Ukraine) Georgii Kravchenko (Czech Republic) Dalibor Svrčina (Serbia) Marko Tepavac
June 17	Balatonalmádi, Hungary; Clay; M15; Singles and Doubles Draws	(Brazil) Matheus Pucinelli de Almeida (Brazil) João Lucas Reis da Silva; 6–4, 7–6^{(7–1)}	(Austria) Lenny Hampel (Austria) Neil Oberleitner	(Russia) Artem Dubrivnyy (Argentina) Mariano Kestelboim	(Belgium) Zizou Bergs (Ukraine) Georgii Kravchenko (Czech Republic) Dalibor Svrčina (Serbia) Marko Tepavac
June 17	Netanya, Israel; Hard; M15; Singles and Doubles Draws	(Israel) Yshai Oliel; 3–6, 6–4, 6–3	(Brazil) Gilbert Klier Júnior	(Ukraine) Vladyslav Orlov (France) Quentin Robert	(United States) Peter Kobelt (Israel) Or Ram-Harel (Italy) Erik Crepaldi (United States) Noah Schachter
June 17	Netanya, Israel; Hard; M15; Singles and Doubles Draws	(United Kingdom) Ben Jones (Ukraine) Vladyslav Orlov; 7–6^{(7–4)}, 6–2	(Israel) Yannai Barkai (Israel) Jordan Hasson	(Ukraine) Vladyslav Orlov (France) Quentin Robert	(United States) Peter Kobelt (Israel) Or Ram-Harel (Italy) Erik Crepaldi (United States) Noah Schachter
June 17	Gimcheon, South Korea; Hard; M15; Singles and Doubles Draws	(South Korea) Hong Seong-chan; 6–1, 5–7, 6–2	(Japan) Yuta Shimizu	(South Korea) Shin San-hui (Japan) Ryota Tanuma	(Japan) Takuto Niki (South Korea) Jeong Yeong-seok (Japan) Taisei Ichikawa (South Korea) Kim Cheong-eui
June 17	Gimcheon, South Korea; Hard; M15; Singles and Doubles Draws	(South Korea) Choi Jae-won (South Korea) Moon Ju-hae; 4–6, 6–3, [10–8]	(United States) Matthew Mendez (France) Jean Thirouin	(South Korea) Shin San-hui (Japan) Ryota Tanuma	(Japan) Takuto Niki (South Korea) Jeong Yeong-seok (Japan) Taisei Ichikawa (South Korea) Kim Cheong-eui
June 17	Tabarka, Tunisia; Clay; M15; Singles and Doubles Draws	(Argentina) Sebastián Báez; 6–2, 6–4	(Italy) Alexander Weis	(Switzerland) Adam Moundir (Tunisia) Aziz Dougaz	(Argentina) Genaro Alberto Olivieri (Russia) Yan Bondarevskiy (Poland) Kacper Żuk (Argentina) Nicolás Alberto Arreche
June 17	Tabarka, Tunisia; Clay; M15; Singles and Doubles Draws	(United Kingdom) Toby Martin (United Kingdom) Barnaby Smith; 5–7, 6–1, [10–8]	(Poland) Daniel Michalski (Poland) Kacper Żuk	(Switzerland) Adam Moundir (Tunisia) Aziz Dougaz	(Argentina) Genaro Alberto Olivieri (Russia) Yan Bondarevskiy (Poland) Kacper Żuk (Argentina) Nicolás Alberto Arreche
June 17	Orlando, United States; Clay; M15; Singles and Doubles Draws	(Ecuador) Diego Hidalgo; 6–1, 6–4	(Venezuela) Ricardo Rodríguez	(Argentina) Alan Kohen (United States) Strong Kirchheimer	(United States) Vasil Kirkov (United States) Aleksandar Kovacevic (United States) Paul Oosterbaan (United States) Mwendwa Mbithi
June 17	Orlando, United States; Clay; M15; Singles and Doubles Draws	(United States) Trent Bryde (United States) Tyler Zink; 7–6^{(7–1)}, 6–4	(Ecuador) Diego Hidalgo (Venezuela) Ricardo Rodríguez	(Argentina) Alan Kohen (United States) Strong Kirchheimer	(United States) Vasil Kirkov (United States) Aleksandar Kovacevic (United States) Paul Oosterbaan (United States) Mwendwa Mbithi
June 17	Harare, Zimbabwe; Hard; M15; Singles and Doubles Draws	(Zimbabwe) Takanyi Garanganga; 6–3, 6–4	(Canada) Martin Beran	(India) S D Prajwal Dev (Burundi) Guy Orly Iradukunda	(Sweden) Markus Schultz (Monaco) Lucas Catarina (United Kingdom) Joshua Paris (Zimbabwe) Benjamin Lock
June 17	Harare, Zimbabwe; Hard; M15; Singles and Doubles Draws	(India) S D Prajwal Dev (India) Rishi Reddy; 7–6^{(7–5)}, 6–4	(Canada) Martin Beran (United Kingdom) Joshua Paris	(India) S D Prajwal Dev (Burundi) Guy Orly Iradukunda	(Sweden) Markus Schultz (Monaco) Lucas Catarina (United Kingdom) Joshua Paris (Zimbabwe) Benjamin Lock
June 24	Arlon, Belgium; Clay; M25+H; Singles and Doubles Draws	(Belgium) Jeroen Vanneste; 7–5, 7–6^{(7–5)}	(Peru) Juan Pablo Varillas	(Switzerland) Sandro Ehrat (Belgium) Yannick Vandenbulcke	(Germany) Marvin Netuschil (Belgium) Zizou Bergs (Russia) Teymuraz Gabashvili (Argentina) Facundo Mena
June 24	Arlon, Belgium; Clay; M25+H; Singles and Doubles Draws	(Sweden) Markus Eriksson (Belgium) Jeroen Vanneste; 6–2, 6–2	(Argentina) Facundo Mena (Belgium) Martin van der Meerschen	(Switzerland) Sandro Ehrat (Belgium) Yannick Vandenbulcke	(Germany) Marvin Netuschil (Belgium) Zizou Bergs (Russia) Teymuraz Gabashvili (Argentina) Facundo Mena
June 24	Yinchuan, China; Hard; M25; Singles and Doubles Draws	(Japan) Yuta Shimizu; 4–6, 3–3, ret.	(China) Bai Yan	(Japan) Takuto Niki (China) Hua Runhao	(China) Sun Fajing (China) Gao Xin (Japan) Rio Noguchi (Switzerland) Luca Castelnuovo
June 24	Yinchuan, China; Hard; M25; Singles and Doubles Draws	(Thailand) Sanchai Ratiwatana (Thailand) Sonchat Ratiwatana; 7–6^{(8–6)}, 6–3	(Japan) Shinji Hazawa (Japan) Yuta Shimizu	(Japan) Takuto Niki (China) Hua Runhao	(China) Sun Fajing (China) Gao Xin (Japan) Rio Noguchi (Switzerland) Luca Castelnuovo
June 24	Pardubice, Czech Republic; Clay; M25; Singles and Doubles Draws	(France) Manuel Guinard; 6–4, 5–7, 7–6^{(8–6)}	(Slovakia) Lukáš Klein	(Czech Republic) Václav Šafránek (Argentina) Mariano Kestelboim	(Czech Republic) Pavel Nejedlý (Czech Republic) Adam Pavlásek (Czech Republic) Michael Vrbenský (Czech Republic) Vít Kopřiva
June 24	Pardubice, Czech Republic; Clay; M25; Singles and Doubles Draws	(Czech Republic) Vít Kopřiva (Czech Republic) Jaroslav Pospíšil; 6–4, 6–2	(Tunisia) Aziz Dougaz (France) Manuel Guinard	(Czech Republic) Václav Šafránek (Argentina) Mariano Kestelboim	(Czech Republic) Pavel Nejedlý (Czech Republic) Adam Pavlásek (Czech Republic) Michael Vrbenský (Czech Republic) Vít Kopřiva
June 24	Montauban, France; Clay; M25; Singles and Doubles Draws	(Brazil) Thiago Seyboth Wild; 6–4, 6–2	(France) Hugo Gaston	(France) Dan Added (France) Jules Okala	(France) Clément Tabur (France) Antoine Cornut-Chauvinc (Bulgaria) Alexander Donski (Argentina) Gonzalo Villanueva
June 24	Montauban, France; Clay; M25; Singles and Doubles Draws	(Colombia) Alejandro Gómez (United States) Junior Alexander Ore; 6–2, 6–2	(France) Dan Added (Brazil) Thiago Seyboth Wild	(France) Dan Added (France) Jules Okala	(France) Clément Tabur (France) Antoine Cornut-Chauvinc (Bulgaria) Alexander Donski (Argentina) Gonzalo Villanueva
June 24	Palma del Río, Spain; Hard; M25+H; Singles and Doubles Draws	(Spain) Andrés Artuñedo; 6–7^{(2–7)}, 6–1, 6–4	(France) Arthur Rinderknech	(South Africa) Ruan Roelofse (France) Tom Jomby	(Spain) John Echeverría (Spain) Ricardo Ojeda Lara (Spain) Benjamín Winter López (United States) Kevin King
June 24	Palma del Río, Spain; Hard; M25+H; Singles and Doubles Draws	(France) Tom Jomby (France) Mick Lescure; 7–6^{(7–5)}, 6–4	(Austria) Maximilian Neuchrist (France) Albano Olivetti	(South Africa) Ruan Roelofse (France) Tom Jomby	(Spain) John Echeverría (Spain) Ricardo Ojeda Lara (Spain) Benjamín Winter López (United States) Kevin King
June 24	Curitiba, Brazil; Clay (indoor); M15; Singles and Doubles Draws	(Argentina) Juan Pablo Ficovich; 6–3, 7–6^{(7–3)}	(Brazil) João Pedro Sorgi	(Brazil) Igor Marcondes (Brazil) Felipe Meligeni Alves	(Brazil) Rafael Matos (Argentina) Hernán Casanova (Argentina) Maximiliano Estévez (Brazil) Oscar José Gutierrez
June 24	Curitiba, Brazil; Clay (indoor); M15; Singles and Doubles Draws	(Brazil) Igor Marcondes (Brazil) Felipe Meligeni Alves; 6–4, 3–6, [10–6]	(Brazil) Oscar José Gutierrez (Argentina) Fermín Tenti	(Brazil) Igor Marcondes (Brazil) Felipe Meligeni Alves	(Brazil) Rafael Matos (Argentina) Hernán Casanova (Argentina) Maximiliano Estévez (Brazil) Oscar José Gutierrez
June 24	Kamen, Germany; Clay; M15; Singles and Doubles Draws	(Germany) Peter Heller; 7–5, 3–6, 6–3	(Spain) Javier Barranco Cosano	(Germany) Pascal Meis (Bulgaria) Alexandar Lazarov	(Brazil) Daniel Dutra da Silva (Australia) James Frawley (Russia) Ronald Slobodchikov (Switzerland) Riccardo Maiga
June 24	Kamen, Germany; Clay; M15; Singles and Doubles Draws	(Russia) Shalva Dzhanashiya (Russia) Yan Sabanin; 6–4, 7–5	(Bulgaria) Alexandar Lazarov (Germany) Alexander Mannapov	(Germany) Pascal Meis (Bulgaria) Alexandar Lazarov	(Brazil) Daniel Dutra da Silva (Australia) James Frawley (Russia) Ronald Slobodchikov (Switzerland) Riccardo Maiga
June 24	Cancún, Mexico; Hard; M15; Singles and Doubles Draws	(Argentina) Axel Geller; 6–3, 7–6^{(7–4)}	(United States) Nick Chappell	(Canada) Benjamin Sigouin (Mexico) Gerardo López Villaseñor	(United States) Gage Brymer (The Bahamas) Justin Roberts (United States) Connor Farren (Colombia) Nicolás Mejía
June 24	Cancún, Mexico; Hard; M15; Singles and Doubles Draws	(Argentina) Axel Geller (Colombia) Nicolás Mejía; 6–7^{(5–7)}, 6–1, [10–5]	(Antigua and Barbuda) Jody Maginley (The Bahamas) Justin Roberts	(Canada) Benjamin Sigouin (Mexico) Gerardo López Villaseñor	(United States) Gage Brymer (The Bahamas) Justin Roberts (United States) Connor Farren (Colombia) Nicolás Mejía
June 24	Alkmaar, Netherlands; Clay; M15; Singles and Doubles Draws	(Italy) Enrico Dalla Valle; 7–6^{(7–4)}, 6–4	(Netherlands) Niels Lootsma	(Netherlands) Jesper de Jong (Argentina) Matías Zukas	(Italy) Andrea Bolla (Netherlands) Igor Sijsling (Northern Mariana Islands) Colin Sinclair (Chile) Bastián Malla
June 24	Alkmaar, Netherlands; Clay; M15; Singles and Doubles Draws	(France) Yanais Laurent (Netherlands) Niels Lootsma; 6–7^{(8–10)}, 6–3, [10–8]	(Switzerland) Rémy Bertola (Italy) Andrea Bolla	(Netherlands) Jesper de Jong (Argentina) Matías Zukas	(Italy) Andrea Bolla (Netherlands) Igor Sijsling (Northern Mariana Islands) Colin Sinclair (Chile) Bastián Malla
June 24	Setúbal, Portugal; Hard; M15; Singles and Doubles Draws	(Portugal) Nuno Borges; 6–3, 6–4	(Portugal) Fred Gil	(France) Hugo Grenier (United States) Henry Craig	(Bulgaria) Simon Anthony Ivanov (Ukraine) Marat Deviatiarov (Portugal) Luís Faria (Italy) Erik Crepaldi
June 24	Setúbal, Portugal; Hard; M15; Singles and Doubles Draws	(United States) Henry Craig (Bulgaria) Simon Anthony Ivanov; 6–4, 4–6, [10–6]	(Italy) Erik Crepaldi (Germany) Robert Strombachs	(France) Hugo Grenier (United States) Henry Craig	(Bulgaria) Simon Anthony Ivanov (Ukraine) Marat Deviatiarov (Portugal) Luís Faria (Italy) Erik Crepaldi
June 24	Anseong, South Korea; Clay (indoor); M15; Singles and Doubles Draws	(Japan) Haru Inoue; 6–4, 6–0	(South Korea) Kim Cheong-eui	(Australia) Thomas Fancutt (Canada) Kelsey Stevenson	(France) Jean Thirouin (South Korea) Oh Seong-gook (Chinese Taipei) Meng Cing-yang (South Korea) Na Jung-woong
June 24	Anseong, South Korea; Clay (indoor); M15; Singles and Doubles Draws	(Japan) Haru Inoue (Japan) Ryota Tanuma; Walkover	(South Korea) Jeong Yeong-seok (South Korea) Park Ui-sung	(Australia) Thomas Fancutt (Canada) Kelsey Stevenson	(France) Jean Thirouin (South Korea) Oh Seong-gook (Chinese Taipei) Meng Cing-yang (South Korea) Na Jung-woong
June 24	Tabarka, Tunisia; Clay; M15; Singles and Doubles Draws	(Argentina) Manuel Peña López; 6–1, 2–6, 6–2	(Spain) Pol Martín Tiffon	(Russia) Andrey Chepelev (Russia) Ivan Nedelko	(United States) Tristan Boyer (Poland) Daniel Michalski (Italy) Alexander Weis (Russia) Yan Bondarevskiy
June 24	Tabarka, Tunisia; Clay; M15; Singles and Doubles Draws	(Peru) Alexander Merino (Argentina) Manuel Peña López; 7–5, 7–6^{(7–4)}	(Argentina) Nicolás Alberto Arreche (Argentina) Franco Feitt	(Russia) Andrey Chepelev (Russia) Ivan Nedelko	(United States) Tristan Boyer (Poland) Daniel Michalski (Italy) Alexander Weis (Russia) Yan Bondarevskiy
June 24	Rochester, United States; Clay; M15; Singles and Doubles Draws	(Ecuador) Diego Hidalgo; 7–6^{(10–8)}, 7–6^{(7–2)}	(United States) Strong Kirchheimer	(United States) Kyle Seelig (Sweden) Simon Freund	(United States) Justin Butsch (United States) Wil Spencer (United States) Ronan Jachuck (Venezuela) Ricardo Rodríguez
June 24	Rochester, United States; Clay; M15; Singles and Doubles Draws	(United States) Justin Butsch (Sweden) Simon Freund; 7–5, 7–5	(United States) Vasil Kirkov (United States) Zachary Svajda	(United States) Kyle Seelig (Sweden) Simon Freund	(United States) Justin Butsch (United States) Wil Spencer (United States) Ronan Jachuck (Venezuela) Ricardo Rodríguez
June 24	Harare, Zimbabwe; Hard; M15; Singles and Doubles Draws	(Zimbabwe) Benjamin Lock; 6–4, 6–0	(Zimbabwe) Takanyi Garanganga	(South Africa) Charl Morgan (Monaco) Lucas Catarina	(Canada) Martin Beran (India) Dhruv Sunish (Canada) Riaan du Toit (Iran) Hamidreza Nadaf
June 24	Harare, Zimbabwe; Hard; M15; Singles and Doubles Draws	(Zimbabwe) Benjamin Lock (Zimbabwe) Courtney John Lock; 6–3, 6–0	(Canada) Martin Beran (United Kingdom) Joshua Paris	(South Africa) Charl Morgan (Monaco) Lucas Catarina	(Canada) Martin Beran (India) Dhruv Sunish (Canada) Riaan du Toit (Iran) Hamidreza Nadaf
