= Paul Oosterbaan =

American tennis player

- Full name: Paul C. Oosterbaan
- Country (sports): United States
- Born: September 8, 1995 (age 30) Kalamazoo, Michigan
- Height: 6 ft 8 in (203 cm)
- Plays: Right-handed
- Prize money: $24,747

Singles
- Career record: no value
- Highest ranking: No. 644 (August 12, 2019)

Doubles
- Career record: 0–1
- Highest ranking: No. 717 (August 19, 2019)

Grand Slam doubles results
- US Open: 1R (2013)

Paul Oosterbaan (born September 8, 1995) is an American professional tennis player.

A native of Kalamazoo, Oosterbaan comes from a sporting family. His father, JP Oosterbaan, won an NCAA national championship in basketball for the University of Michigan. Two siblings, Lizzie and Teddy, have both played Division I collegiate tennis. He is also a relative of college football player Bennie Oosterbaan.

Oosterbaan partnered with Ronnie Schneider to win the doubles title at the USTA national championships (18s) in 2013, which earned them a wildcard spot to the US Open main draw. They were beaten in the first round of the US Open by Brian Baker and Rajeev Ram. The following year he began playing collegiate tennis for the University of Georgia.

== ITF Futures finals ==
=== Singles: 1 (0–1) ===
Result	W–L	Date	Tournament	Surface	Opponent	Score
Loss	0–1	Jun 2018	Canada F3, Calgary	Hard	(United States) Thai-Son Kwiatkowski	4–6, 3–6

=== Doubles: 4 (0–4) ===
Result	W–L	Date	Tournament	Surface	Partner	Opponents	Score
Loss	0–1	Jun 2018	Turkey F21, Antalya	Clay	(Turkey) Can Kaya	(Germany) Peter Heller (Mexico) Luis Patiño	3–6, 3–6
Loss	0–2	Aug 2018	USA F23, Boston	Hard	(United States) Felix Corwin	(United States) Martin Redlicki (United States) Evan Zhu	5–7, 7–6^{(13)}, [1–10]
Loss	0–3	Sep 2018	USA F24, Claremont	Hard	(United States) Samuel Shropshire	(United States) Robert Kelly (United States) Korey Lovett	6–7^{(3)}, 4–6
Loss	0–4	Jun 2019	M15, Cancún	Hard	(United States) Alexios Halebian	(Australia) Matthew Romios (Australia) Brandon Walkin	2–6, 6–2, [8–10]
