= Edris =

Edris may refer to:

== Given name ==
- Edris Allan (1909–1995), Jamaican community worker, political figure and women's rights advocate
- Edris Eckhardt (1905–1998), American artist associated with the Cleveland School
- Edris Fetisleam (born 1999), Romanian tennis player
- Edris Albert "Eddie" Hapgood (1908–1973), English footballer
- Edris Rice-Wray Carson (1904–1990), American birth control activist
- Edris Saint-Amand (1918–2004), Haitian novelist
- Edris Stannus, the birth name of Ninette de Valois (1898–2001), Irish-born British dancer, teacher, choreographer

== Family name ==
- Amina Edris, New Zealand operatic soprano
- Muktar Edris (born 1994), Ethiopian professional long-distance runner
- Zakaria Edris, Malaysian politician

== See also ==
- Edris a jin, Druze cross and circle game
- Edris House, Palm Springs, California, US
- Shahdali Edris, a village in Iran
