= Shahdali =

Shahdali (Persian: شهدالي) may refer to:

- Shahdali Edris
- Shahdali Sib Ali
