= 2018 ITF Men's Circuit (October–December) =

The 2018 ITF Men's Circuit is the 2018 edition of the second-tier tour for men's professional tennis. It is organised by the International Tennis Federation and is a tier below the ATP Tour. The ITF Men's Circuit includes tournaments with prize money ranging from $15,000 up to $25,000.

== Key ==
$15,000 tournaments
$25,000 tournaments

== Month ==
=== October ===
Week of	Tournament	Winner	Runners-up	Semifinalists	Quarterfinalists
October 1	Australia F7 Futures; Brisbane, Australia; Hard $25,000; Singles and doubles draws	(United Kingdom) Evan Hoyt; 6–4, 7–6^{(7–5)}	(Northern Mariana Islands) Colin Sinclair	(United States) Dusty Boyer (Australia) Michael Look	(China) Wang Aoran (Australia) Benjamin Mitchell (Japan) Hiroyasu Ehara (Australia) Blake Ellis
October 1	Australia F7 Futures; Brisbane, Australia; Hard $25,000; Singles and doubles draws	(Australia) Jeremy Beale (Australia) Thomas Fancutt; 2–6, 6–4, [10–6]	(United Kingdom) Brydan Klein (Australia) Scott Puodziunas	(United States) Dusty Boyer (Australia) Michael Look	(China) Wang Aoran (Australia) Benjamin Mitchell (Japan) Hiroyasu Ehara (Australia) Blake Ellis
October 1	France F20 Futures; Nevers, France; Hard (indoor) $25,000+H; Singles and doubles draws	(France) Grégoire Jacq; 6–3, 6–2	(France) Gleb Sakharov	(France) Sébastien Boltz (France) Yannick Jankovits	(France) Mick Lescure (France) Antoine Cornut-Chauvinc (Réunion) Quentin Robert (France) Rémi Boutillier
October 1	France F20 Futures; Nevers, France; Hard (indoor) $25,000+H; Singles and doubles draws	(France) Matteo Martineau (France) Hugo Voljacques; 6–7^{(8–10)}, 6–3, [10–5]	(France) Dan Added (France) Mick Lescure	(France) Sébastien Boltz (France) Yannick Jankovits	(France) Mick Lescure (France) Antoine Cornut-Chauvinc (Réunion) Quentin Robert (France) Rémi Boutillier
October 1	Italy F30 Futures; Pula, Italy; Clay $25,000; Singles and doubles draws	(Italy) Antonio Massara; 6–3, 6–2	(Germany) Peter Torebko	(Italy) Walter Trusendi (Spain) Pol Toledo Bagué	(Russia) Ivan Gakhov (Brazil) Bruno Sant'Anna (Italy) Giulio Zeppieri (Italy) Davide Galoppini
October 1	Italy F30 Futures; Pula, Italy; Clay $25,000; Singles and doubles draws	(Russia) Ivan Gakhov (Austria) David Pichler; 6–2, 6–2	(Austria) Matthias Haim (Germany) Jakob Sude	(Italy) Walter Trusendi (Spain) Pol Toledo Bagué	(Russia) Ivan Gakhov (Brazil) Bruno Sant'Anna (Italy) Giulio Zeppieri (Italy) Davide Galoppini
October 1	Lebanon F2 Futures; Jounieh, Lebanon; Clay $25,000; Singles and doubles draws	(France) Alexandre Müller; 6–7^{(2–7)}, 6–3, 6–4	(France) Fabien Reboul	(Spain) Jordi Samper Montaña (Czech Republic) Jaroslav Pospíšil	(Lebanon) Hady Habib (Italy) Nicolò Turchetti (Egypt) Karim-Mohamed Maamoun (France) Sadio Doumbia
October 1	Lebanon F2 Futures; Jounieh, Lebanon; Clay $25,000; Singles and doubles draws	(France) Sadio Doumbia (France) Fabien Reboul; 4–6, 6–2, [10–4]	(Brazil) Wilson Leite (Italy) Nicolò Turchetti	(Spain) Jordi Samper Montaña (Czech Republic) Jaroslav Pospíšil	(Lebanon) Hady Habib (Italy) Nicolò Turchetti (Egypt) Karim-Mohamed Maamoun (France) Sadio Doumbia
October 1	Nigeria F4 Futures; Lagos, Nigeria; Hard $25,000+H; Singles and doubles draws	(France) Tom Jomby; 6–3, 3–6, 6–3	(France) Arthur Rinderknech	(United Kingdom) Jack Draper (Ukraine) Danylo Kalenichenko	(India) Aryan Goveas (United Kingdom) Lloyd Glasspool (India) Niki Kaliyanda Poonacha (Zimbabwe) Benjamin Lock
October 1	Nigeria F4 Futures; Lagos, Nigeria; Hard $25,000+H; Singles and doubles draws	(Ukraine) Danylo Kalenichenko (Brazil) Diego Matos; 2–6, 7–5, [10–7]	(United States) William Bushamuka (France) Arthur Rinderknech	(United Kingdom) Jack Draper (Ukraine) Danylo Kalenichenko	(India) Aryan Goveas (United Kingdom) Lloyd Glasspool (India) Niki Kaliyanda Poonacha (Zimbabwe) Benjamin Lock
October 1	Sweden F5 Futures; Falun, Sweden; Hard (indoor) $25,000; Singles and doubles draws	(Finland) Emil Ruusuvuori; 6–4, 6–4	(Finland) Patrik Niklas-Salminen	(Germany) Johannes Härteis (Sweden) Jonathan Mridha	(Vietnam) Lý Hoàng Nam (Romania) George Botezan (Czech Republic) David Poljak (Sweden) Markus Eriksson
October 1	Sweden F5 Futures; Falun, Sweden; Hard (indoor) $25,000; Singles and doubles draws	(Latvia) Jānis Podžus (Latvia) Mārtiņš Podžus; 6–1, 6–2	(Switzerland) Antoine Bellier (Germany) Johannes Härteis	(Germany) Johannes Härteis (Sweden) Jonathan Mridha	(Vietnam) Lý Hoàng Nam (Romania) George Botezan (Czech Republic) David Poljak (Sweden) Markus Eriksson
October 1	Egypt F21 Futures; Sharm El Sheikh, Egypt; Hard $15,000; Singles and doubles draws	(Spain) David Pérez Sanz; 6–3, 3–6, 7–5	(Italy) Alessandro Bega	(France) Jaimee Floyd Angele (Italy) Simone Roncalli	(Spain) José Francisco Vidal Azorín (Czech Republic) Marek Gengel (Poland) Yann Wójcik (Switzerland) Adam Moundir
October 1	Egypt F21 Futures; Sharm El Sheikh, Egypt; Hard $15,000; Singles and doubles draws	(Italy) Marco Brugnerotto (Spain) David Pérez Sanz; 3–6, 6–2, [10–7]	(Switzerland) Adam Moundir (Poland) Kacper Żuk	(France) Jaimee Floyd Angele (Italy) Simone Roncalli	(Spain) José Francisco Vidal Azorín (Czech Republic) Marek Gengel (Poland) Yann Wójcik (Switzerland) Adam Moundir
October 1	Germany F14 Futures; Oberhaching, Germany; Hard (indoor) $15,000; Singles and doubles draws	(Germany) Dominik Böhler; 6–2, 6–3	(France) Paul Cayre	(Germany) Christoph Negritu (Italy) Francesco Ferrari	(Germany) Constantin Schmitz (Austria) Johannes Bangratz (Germany) Patrick Mayer (Slovakia) Marek Semjan
October 1	Germany F14 Futures; Oberhaching, Germany; Hard (indoor) $15,000; Singles and doubles draws	(Czech Republic) Filip Duda (Czech Republic) Petr Nouza; 7–5, 7–6^{(7–4)}	(Germany) Kai Lemstra (Germany) Christoph Negritu	(Germany) Christoph Negritu (Italy) Francesco Ferrari	(Germany) Constantin Schmitz (Austria) Johannes Bangratz (Germany) Patrick Mayer (Slovakia) Marek Semjan
October 1	Israel F12 Futures; Herzliya, Israel; Hard $15,000; Singles and doubles draws	(Israel) Igor Smilansky; 2–6, 6–3, 6–4	(Israel) Ben Patael	(United Kingdom) Mark Whitehouse (Israel) Jordan Hasson	(Argentina) Matías Franco Descotte (Israel) Alon Elia (Switzerland) Riccardo Maiga (Israel) Ram Kapach
October 1	Israel F12 Futures; Herzliya, Israel; Hard $15,000; Singles and doubles draws	(Switzerland) Luca Castelnuovo (Argentina) Matías Franco Descotte; 1–6, 6–2, [10–7]	(Israel) Alon Elia (Lithuania) Julius Tverijonas	(United Kingdom) Mark Whitehouse (Israel) Jordan Hasson	(Argentina) Matías Franco Descotte (Israel) Alon Elia (Switzerland) Riccardo Maiga (Israel) Ram Kapach
October 1	Peru F2 Futures; Lima, Peru; Clay $15,000; Singles and doubles draws	(Chile) Bastián Malla; 7–6^{(7–1)}, 6–4	(Argentina) Gonzalo Villanueva	(Ecuador) Diego Hidalgo (Colombia) Nicolás Mejía	(Chile) Alejandro Tabilo (Argentina) Mariano Kestelboim (Argentina) Nicolás Alberto Arreche (Peru) Arklon Huertas del Pino
October 1	Peru F2 Futures; Lima, Peru; Clay $15,000; Singles and doubles draws	(Ecuador) Diego Hidalgo (Argentina) Mariano Kestelboim; 6–2, 6–3	(Argentina) Leonardo Aboian (Argentina) Tomás Farjat	(Ecuador) Diego Hidalgo (Colombia) Nicolás Mejía	(Chile) Alejandro Tabilo (Argentina) Mariano Kestelboim (Argentina) Nicolás Alberto Arreche (Peru) Arklon Huertas del Pino
October 1	Portugal F19 Futures; Idanha-a-Nova, Portugal; Hard $15,000; Singles and doubles draws	(Portugal) Fred Gil; 6–2, 7–5	(Portugal) João Monteiro	(Switzerland) Raphael Baltensperger (United States) Ryan Shane	(Spain) Jorge Blanco Guadalupe (Portugal) Tiago Cação (Argentina) Franco Emanuel Egea (Belgium) Jonas Merckx
October 1	Portugal F19 Futures; Idanha-a-Nova, Portugal; Hard $15,000; Singles and doubles draws	(Portugal) Francisco Cabral (Portugal) Fred Gil; 7–6^{(7–5)}, 6–2	(Brazil) Filipe Brandão (Spain) Pedro Vives Marcos	(Switzerland) Raphael Baltensperger (United States) Ryan Shane	(Spain) Jorge Blanco Guadalupe (Portugal) Tiago Cação (Argentina) Franco Emanuel Egea (Belgium) Jonas Merckx
October 1	Spain F30 Futures; Melilla, Spain; Clay $15,000; Singles and doubles draws	(Spain) Álvaro López San Martín; 6–2, 6–1	(Spain) Eduard Esteve Lobato	(Italy) Dante Gennaro (Spain) Alberto Colás Sánchez	(Spain) Pol Martín Tiffon (Morocco) Anas Fattar (Spain) Nikolás Sánchez Izquierdo (Switzerland) Johan Nikles
October 1	Spain F30 Futures; Melilla, Spain; Clay $15,000; Singles and doubles draws	(Spain) Javier Barranco Cosano (Spain) Benjamín Winter López; 6–3, 7–6^{(7–2)}	(Colombia) José Daniel Bendeck (Spain) Marco Neubau	(Italy) Dante Gennaro (Spain) Alberto Colás Sánchez	(Spain) Pol Martín Tiffon (Morocco) Anas Fattar (Spain) Nikolás Sánchez Izquierdo (Switzerland) Johan Nikles
October 1	Thailand F5 Futures; Hua Hin, Thailand; Hard $15,000; Singles and doubles draws	(Japan) Shintaro Imai; 7–6^{(7–4)}, 6–1	(Canada) Kelsey Stevenson	(Japan) Kento Takeuchi (Japan) Jumpei Yamasaki	(Indonesia) David Agung Susanto (Japan) Takashi Saito (Russia) Alexander Igoshin (United States) Felix Corwin
October 1	Thailand F5 Futures; Hua Hin, Thailand; Hard $15,000; Singles and doubles draws	(Philippines) Francis Alcantara (Japan) Shintaro Imai; 7–5, 6–7^{(5–7)}, [10–7]	(Poland) Adrian Andrzejczuk (Chinese Taipei) Yu Cheng-yu	(Japan) Kento Takeuchi (Japan) Jumpei Yamasaki	(Indonesia) David Agung Susanto (Japan) Takashi Saito (Russia) Alexander Igoshin (United States) Felix Corwin
October 1	Tunisia F34 Futures; Monastir, Tunisia; Hard $15,000; Singles and doubles draws	(France) Baptiste Crepatte; 5–7, 7–6^{(7–3)}, 6–2	(Croatia) Duje Ajduković	(Germany) Robert Strombachs (Turkey) Altuğ Çelikbilek	(Netherlands) Alban Meuffels (Belgium) Michael Geerts (Algeria) Nazim Makhlouf (United Kingdom) Samm Butler
October 1	Tunisia F34 Futures; Monastir, Tunisia; Hard $15,000; Singles and doubles draws	(Brazil) Bernardo Oliveira (Germany) Robert Strombachs; 6–4, 6–7^{(6–8)}, [10–6]	(Croatia) Duje Ajduković (Greece) Petros Tsitsipas	(Germany) Robert Strombachs (Turkey) Altuğ Çelikbilek	(Netherlands) Alban Meuffels (Belgium) Michael Geerts (Algeria) Nazim Makhlouf (United Kingdom) Samm Butler
October 1	Turkey F30 Futures; Antalya, Turkey; Clay $15,000; Singles and doubles draws	(Germany) George von Massow; 6–4, 7–5	(Czech Republic) Tadeáš Paroulek	(Germany) Lucas Gerch (Argentina) Juan Pablo Paz	(Italy) Claudio Fortuna (Australia) Christopher O'Connell (Czech Republic) Michael Vrbenský (Czech Republic) Tomáš Jiroušek
October 1	Turkey F30 Futures; Antalya, Turkey; Clay $15,000; Singles and doubles draws	(Argentina) Juan Pablo Paz (Belgium) Jeroen Vanneste; 7–6^{(7–4)}, 6–2	(Turkey) Cengiz Aksu (Turkey) Mert Naci Türker	(Germany) Lucas Gerch (Argentina) Juan Pablo Paz	(Italy) Claudio Fortuna (Australia) Christopher O'Connell (Czech Republic) Michael Vrbenský (Czech Republic) Tomáš Jiroušek
October 8	Australia F8 Futures; Toowoomba, Australia; Hard $25,000; Singles and doubles draws	(Australia) Maverick Banes; 6–4, 6–2	(Northern Mariana Islands) Colin Sinclair	(Australia) Matthew Romios (Japan) Hiroyasu Ehara	(Australia) Jacob Grills (France) Vincent Stouff (Australia) Calum Puttergill (Chinese Taipei) Lee Kuan-yi
October 8	Australia F8 Futures; Toowoomba, Australia; Hard $25,000; Singles and doubles draws	(Australia) Blake Ellis (Australia) Luke Saville; 6–4, 6–7^{(2–7)}, [10–2]	(United Kingdom) Brydan Klein (Australia) Scott Puodziunas	(Australia) Matthew Romios (Japan) Hiroyasu Ehara	(Australia) Jacob Grills (France) Vincent Stouff (Australia) Calum Puttergill (Chinese Taipei) Lee Kuan-yi
October 8	France F21 Futures; Saint-Dizier, France; Hard (indoor) $25,000; Singles and doubles draws	(France) Matteo Martineau; 6–7^{(5–7)}, 6–3, 6–4	(France) Corentin Denolly	(Monaco) Lucas Catarina (Vietnam) Lý Hoàng Nam	(France) Pierre Faivre (France) Jules Marie (France) Dan Added (France) Benjamin Pietri
October 8	France F21 Futures; Saint-Dizier, France; Hard (indoor) $25,000; Singles and doubles draws	(France) Constantin Bittoun Kouzmine (France) Florian Lakat; 6–3, 6–2	(France) Ronan Joncour (France) Yanais Laurent	(Monaco) Lucas Catarina (Vietnam) Lý Hoàng Nam	(France) Pierre Faivre (France) Jules Marie (France) Dan Added (France) Benjamin Pietri
October 8	Italy F31 Futures; Pula, Italy; Clay $25,000; Singles and doubles draws	(Romania) Nicolae Frunză; 6–4, 6–3	(Italy) Jacopo Berrettini	(Italy) Edoardo Eremin (Romania) Bogdan Ionuț Apostol	(Argentina) Franco Capalbo (Italy) Enrico Dalla Valle (Austria) David Pichler (Brazil) Wilson Leite
October 8	Italy F31 Futures; Pula, Italy; Clay $25,000; Singles and doubles draws	(Hungary) Gábor Borsos (Hungary) Péter Nagy; 6–3, 0–6, [10–7]	(Austria) Matthias Haim (Germany) Jakob Sude	(Italy) Edoardo Eremin (Romania) Bogdan Ionuț Apostol	(Argentina) Franco Capalbo (Italy) Enrico Dalla Valle (Austria) David Pichler (Brazil) Wilson Leite
October 8	Nigeria F5 Futures; Lagos, Nigeria; Hard $25,000+H; Singles and doubles draws	(United Kingdom) Jack Draper; 1–6, 6–3, 6–4	(France) Tom Jomby	(France) Arthur Rinderknech (Ukraine) Danylo Kalenichenko	(India) Niki Kaliyanda Poonacha (India) Aryan Goveas (United States) Tyler Lu (Zimbabwe) Benjamin Lock
October 8	Nigeria F5 Futures; Lagos, Nigeria; Hard $25,000+H; Singles and doubles draws	(Zimbabwe) Benjamin Lock (Zimbabwe) Courtney John Lock; 3–6, 6–4, [10–7]	(France) Tom Jomby (Benin) Alexis Klégou	(France) Arthur Rinderknech (Ukraine) Danylo Kalenichenko	(India) Niki Kaliyanda Poonacha (India) Aryan Goveas (United States) Tyler Lu (Zimbabwe) Benjamin Lock
October 8	USA F27 Futures; Houston, United States; Hard $25,000; Singles and doubles draws	(United States) Jared Hiltzik; 6–4, 6–7^{(7–9)}, 7–5	(United States) Ronnie Schneider	(United Kingdom) Ryan Peniston (United States) Jordi Arconada	(United States) Evan Zhu (United States) Patrick Kypson (France) Maxime Tchoutakian (Republic of Ireland) Peter Bothwell
October 8	USA F27 Futures; Houston, United States; Hard $25,000; Singles and doubles draws	(France) Maxime Cressy (United States) Nicolas Meister; 7–5, 6–3	(United States) John Paul Fruttero (Portugal) Bernardo Saraiva	(United Kingdom) Ryan Peniston (United States) Jordi Arconada	(United States) Evan Zhu (United States) Patrick Kypson (France) Maxime Tchoutakian (Republic of Ireland) Peter Bothwell
October 8	Egypt F22 Futures; Sharm El Sheikh, Egypt; Hard $15,000; Singles and doubles draws	(Spain) David Pérez Sanz; 6–7^{(7–9)}, 6–4, 6–3	(United Kingdom) Neil Pauffley	(Italy) Giorgio Ricca (Italy) Simone Roncalli	(Belgium) Tom Pisane (Germany) Kai Wehnelt (Italy) Marco Brugnerotto (Canada) Samuel Philp
October 8	Egypt F22 Futures; Sharm El Sheikh, Egypt; Hard $15,000; Singles and doubles draws	(Italy) Marco Brugnerotto (Spain) David Pérez Sanz; 7–5, 3–6, [10–6]	(Switzerland) Adam Moundir (Germany) Kai Wehnelt	(Italy) Giorgio Ricca (Italy) Simone Roncalli	(Belgium) Tom Pisane (Germany) Kai Wehnelt (Italy) Marco Brugnerotto (Canada) Samuel Philp
October 8	Germany F15 Futures; Bad Salzdetfurth, Germany; Carpet (indoor) $15,000; Singles and doubles draws	(Germany) Dominik Böhler; 7–6^{(10–8)}, 4–6, 7–6^{(10–8)}	(Ukraine) Vadym Ursu	(Germany) Mats Rosenkranz (Germany) Bastien Presuhn	(Switzerland) Sandro Ehrat (Germany) Stefan Seifert (Russia) Denis Matsukevich (United Kingdom) Jonathan Binding
October 8	Germany F15 Futures; Bad Salzdetfurth, Germany; Carpet (indoor) $15,000; Singles and doubles draws	(Czech Republic) Petr Nouza (Germany) Mats Rosenkranz; 4–6, 6–3, [14–12]	(Turkey) Altuğ Çelikbilek (France) Hugo Voljacques	(Germany) Mats Rosenkranz (Germany) Bastien Presuhn	(Switzerland) Sandro Ehrat (Germany) Stefan Seifert (Russia) Denis Matsukevich (United Kingdom) Jonathan Binding
October 8	Israel F13 Futures; Ashkelon, Israel; Hard $15,000; Singles and doubles draws	(Israel) Ben Patael; 6–4, 6–2	(Argentina) Matías Franco Descotte	(Israel) Igor Smilansky (Israel) Edan Leshem	(Switzerland) Riccardo Maiga (Israel) Shahar Elbaz (Switzerland) Jakub Paul (United Kingdom) Aidan McHugh
October 8	Israel F13 Futures; Ashkelon, Israel; Hard $15,000; Singles and doubles draws	(Netherlands) Guy den Heijer (Netherlands) Sidané Pontjodikromo; 7–5, 6–4	(United Kingdom) Aidan McHugh (Switzerland) Jakub Paul	(Israel) Igor Smilansky (Israel) Edan Leshem	(Switzerland) Riccardo Maiga (Israel) Shahar Elbaz (Switzerland) Jakub Paul (United Kingdom) Aidan McHugh
October 8	Peru F3 Futures; Lima, Peru; Clay $15,000; Singles and doubles draws	(Chile) Bastián Malla; 6–3, 6–1	(Argentina) Tomás Martín Etcheverry	(Argentina) Mariano Kestelboim (Ecuador) Diego Hidalgo	(Argentina) Gonzalo Villanueva (Argentina) Genaro Alberto Olivieri (Peru) Arklon Huertas del Pino (Brazil) Nicolas Santos
October 8	Peru F3 Futures; Lima, Peru; Clay $15,000; Singles and doubles draws	(United States) Junior Alexander Ore (Peru) Jorge Panta; 6–3, 6–3	(Argentina) Genaro Alberto Olivieri (Argentina) Manuel Peña López	(Argentina) Mariano Kestelboim (Ecuador) Diego Hidalgo	(Argentina) Gonzalo Villanueva (Argentina) Genaro Alberto Olivieri (Peru) Arklon Huertas del Pino (Brazil) Nicolas Santos
October 8	Portugal F20 Futures; Idanha-a-Nova, Portugal; Hard $15,000; Singles and doubles draws	(Portugal) João Monteiro; 6–2, 6–0	(Austria) Peter Goldsteiner	(United States) Ryan Shane (United States) Maksim Tikhomirov	(United States) Justin Butsch (Switzerland) Raphael Baltensperger (Argentina) Franco Emanuel Egea (Austria) Gabriel Schmidt
October 8	Portugal F20 Futures; Idanha-a-Nova, Portugal; Hard $15,000; Singles and doubles draws	(United States) Justin Butsch (United States) Ryan Shane; 6–3, 6–3	(Argentina) Franco Emanuel Egea (Austria) Peter Goldsteiner	(United States) Ryan Shane (United States) Maksim Tikhomirov	(United States) Justin Butsch (Switzerland) Raphael Baltensperger (Argentina) Franco Emanuel Egea (Austria) Gabriel Schmidt
October 8	Spain F31 Futures; Riba-roja de Túria, Spain; Clay $15,000; Singles and doubles draws	(Belgium) Germain Gigounon; 6–7^{(4–7)}, 6–2, 6–1	(Spain) Nikolás Sánchez Izquierdo	(Spain) Marc Giner (Spain) Javier Barranco Cosano	(Belgium) Omar Salman (Spain) Pol Martín Tiffon (Brazil) Jordan Correia (Switzerland) Johan Nikles
October 8	Spain F31 Futures; Riba-roja de Túria, Spain; Clay $15,000; Singles and doubles draws	(Spain) Marc Fornell Mestres (Spain) Marc Giner; 6–3, 6–1	(Spain) Javier Barranco Cosano (Spain) Bruno Mardones	(Spain) Marc Giner (Spain) Javier Barranco Cosano	(Belgium) Omar Salman (Spain) Pol Martín Tiffon (Brazil) Jordan Correia (Switzerland) Johan Nikles
October 8	Thailand F6 Futures; Hua Hin, Thailand; Hard $15,000; Singles and doubles draws	(New Zealand) Ajeet Rai; 6–3, 4–6, 6–4	(India) Manish Sureshkumar	(Slovenia) Matic Špec (Russia) Shalva Dzhanashiya	(Japan) Kento Takeuchi (Japan) Takashi Saito (India) Karunuday Singh (United States) Felix Corwin
October 8	Thailand F6 Futures; Hua Hin, Thailand; Hard $15,000; Singles and doubles draws	(Philippines) Francis Alcantara (Thailand) Sonchat Ratiwatana; 6–1, 1–6, [10–6]	(New Zealand) Ajeet Rai (India) Karunuday Singh	(Slovenia) Matic Špec (Russia) Shalva Dzhanashiya	(Japan) Kento Takeuchi (Japan) Takashi Saito (India) Karunuday Singh (United States) Felix Corwin
October 8	Tunisia F35 Futures; Monastir, Tunisia; Hard $15,000; Singles and doubles draws	(Germany) Robert Strombachs; 6–4, 6–0	(Russia) Alexey Zakharov	(France) Quentin Folliot (Switzerland) Antoine Bellier	(Spain) Albert Roglan (Belgium) Michael Geerts (Russia) Bogdan Bobrov (United Kingdom) Samm Butler
October 8	Tunisia F35 Futures; Monastir, Tunisia; Hard $15,000; Singles and doubles draws	(Brazil) Bernardo Oliveira (Germany) Robert Strombachs; 3–6, 6–3, [10–1]	(Réunion) Quentin Robert (France) Hugo Schott	(France) Quentin Folliot (Switzerland) Antoine Bellier	(Spain) Albert Roglan (Belgium) Michael Geerts (Russia) Bogdan Bobrov (United Kingdom) Samm Butler
October 8	Turkey F31 Futures; Antalya, Turkey; Clay $15,000; Singles and doubles draws	(Czech Republic) Vít Kopřiva; 7–6^{(7–5)}, 3–1, ret.	(Sweden) Dragoș Nicolae Mădăraș	(Argentina) Juan Pablo Paz (Czech Republic) Jaroslav Pospíšil	(Netherlands) Bart Stevens (Germany) Flemming Peters (Ukraine) Eric Vanshelboim (Netherlands) Mick Veldheer
October 8	Turkey F31 Futures; Antalya, Turkey; Clay $15,000; Singles and doubles draws	(Czech Republic) Vít Kopřiva (Czech Republic) Jaroslav Pospíšil; 6–0, 4–6, [10–2]	(Turkey) Gökberk Ergeneman (Turkey) Mert Naci Türker	(Argentina) Juan Pablo Paz (Czech Republic) Jaroslav Pospíšil	(Netherlands) Bart Stevens (Germany) Flemming Peters (Ukraine) Eric Vanshelboim (Netherlands) Mick Veldheer
October 15	France F22 Futures; Rodez, France; Hard (indoor) $25,000+H; Singles and doubles draws	(France) Grégoire Jacq; 7–6^{(7–5)}, 6–4	(France) Rémi Boutillier	(France) Matteo Martineau (France) Tom Jomby	(France) Constantin Bittoun Kouzmine (Netherlands) Gijs Brouwer (France) Yanais Laurent (France) Yannick Jankovits
October 15	France F22 Futures; Rodez, France; Hard (indoor) $25,000+H; Singles and doubles draws	(Spain) Andrés Artuñedo (Spain) Sergio Martos Gornés; 6–1, 6–4	(France) Joffrey de Schepper (France) Pierre Faivre	(France) Matteo Martineau (France) Tom Jomby	(France) Constantin Bittoun Kouzmine (Netherlands) Gijs Brouwer (France) Yanais Laurent (France) Yannick Jankovits
October 15	Israel F14 Futures; Meitar, Israel; Hard $25,000; Singles and doubles draws	(France) Baptiste Crepatte; 7–6^{(10–8)}, 6–3	(Israel) Edan Leshem	(Italy) Fabrizio Ornago (Netherlands) Ryan Nijboer	(United States) Jeremy Sonkin (Israel) Igor Smilansky (Italy) Claudio Fortuna (Argentina) Matías Franco Descotte
October 15	Israel F14 Futures; Meitar, Israel; Hard $25,000; Singles and doubles draws	(Argentina) Matías Franco Descotte (Italy) Francesco Ferrari; 7–5, 7–6^{(8–6)}	(Switzerland) Luca Castelnuovo (France) Baptiste Crepatte	(Italy) Fabrizio Ornago (Netherlands) Ryan Nijboer	(United States) Jeremy Sonkin (Israel) Igor Smilansky (Italy) Claudio Fortuna (Argentina) Matías Franco Descotte
October 15	Italy F32 Futures; Pula, Italy; Clay $25,000; Singles and doubles draws	(Italy) Raúl Brancaccio; 6–2, 6–3	(Italy) Stefano Baldoni	(Italy) Andrea Basso (Spain) Álvaro López San Martín	(Belgium) Omar Salman (Italy) Enrico Dalla Valle (Belgium) Germain Gigounon (Argentina) Thiago Agustín Tirante
October 15	Italy F32 Futures; Pula, Italy; Clay $25,000; Singles and doubles draws	(Brazil) Wilson Leite (Germany) Jakob Sude; 6–4, 6–1	(Switzerland) Johan Nikles (Belgium) Omar Salman	(Italy) Andrea Basso (Spain) Álvaro López San Martín	(Belgium) Omar Salman (Italy) Enrico Dalla Valle (Belgium) Germain Gigounon (Argentina) Thiago Agustín Tirante
October 15	USA F28 Futures; Harlingen, United States; Hard $25,000; Singles and doubles draws	(United States) Oliver Crawford; 6–1, 6–1	(United Kingdom) Andrew Watson	(Kazakhstan) Denis Yevseyev (United States) Jordi Arconada	(United Kingdom) Ryan Peniston (Portugal) Nuno Borges (Bolivia) Juan Carlos Aguilar (France) Maxime Cressy
October 15	USA F28 Futures; Harlingen, United States; Hard $25,000; Singles and doubles draws	(France) Maxime Cressy (United States) Nicolas Meister; 6–4, 6–2	(United States) John Paul Fruttero (United States) Ronnie Schneider	(Kazakhstan) Denis Yevseyev (United States) Jordi Arconada	(United Kingdom) Ryan Peniston (Portugal) Nuno Borges (Bolivia) Juan Carlos Aguilar (France) Maxime Cressy
October 15	Brazil F5 Futures; Mogi das Cruzes, Brazil; Clay $15,000; Singles and doubles draws	(Argentina) Francisco Cerúndolo; 6–2, 6–4	(Brazil) Daniel Dutra da Silva	(Brazil) Rafael Matos (Sweden) Christian Lindell	(Brazil) Oscar José Gutierrez (Brazil) João Lucas Reis da Silva (Brazil) André Miele (Brazil) João Souza
October 15	Brazil F5 Futures; Mogi das Cruzes, Brazil; Clay $15,000; Singles and doubles draws	(Brazil) Rafael Matos (Argentina) Facundo Mena; 6–1, 6–2	(Brazil) Daniel Dutra da Silva (Brazil) Eduardo Russi Assumpção	(Brazil) Rafael Matos (Sweden) Christian Lindell	(Brazil) Oscar José Gutierrez (Brazil) João Lucas Reis da Silva (Brazil) André Miele (Brazil) João Souza
October 15	Egypt F23 Futures; Sharm El Sheikh, Egypt; Hard $15,000; Singles and doubles draws	(Egypt) Karim-Mohamed Maamoun; 6–3, 6–4	(United Kingdom) Neil Pauffley	(Spain) David Pérez Sanz (Italy) Liam Caruana	(Czech Republic) Petr Hájek (Russia) Shalva Dzhanashiya (France) Gabriel Petit (Belarus) Aliaksandr Bulitski
October 15	Egypt F23 Futures; Sharm El Sheikh, Egypt; Hard $15,000; Singles and doubles draws	(Spain) David Pérez Sanz (Germany) Kai Wehnelt; 6–3, 6–3	(Portugal) Francisco Dias (Switzerland) Adam Moundir	(Spain) David Pérez Sanz (Italy) Liam Caruana	(Czech Republic) Petr Hájek (Russia) Shalva Dzhanashiya (France) Gabriel Petit (Belarus) Aliaksandr Bulitski
October 15	Portugal F21 Futures; São Brás de Alportel, Portugal; Hard $15,000; Singles and doubles draws	(Portugal) João Monteiro; 6–2, 4–0, ret.	(Portugal) Fred Gil	(Germany) Mats Rosenkranz (Spain) Miguel Semmler	(Portugal) Martim Leote Prata (Portugal) Tiago Cação (Argentina) Franco Emanuel Egea (Portugal) Luís Faria
October 15	Portugal F21 Futures; São Brás de Alportel, Portugal; Hard $15,000; Singles and doubles draws	(Portugal) Fred Gil (Brazil) Diego Matos; 7–6^{(7–4)}, 2–6, [11–9]	(Brazil) Eduardo Dischinger (Portugal) Gonçalo Falcão	(Germany) Mats Rosenkranz (Spain) Miguel Semmler	(Portugal) Martim Leote Prata (Portugal) Tiago Cação (Argentina) Franco Emanuel Egea (Portugal) Luís Faria
October 15	Tunisia F36 Futures; Monastir, Tunisia; Hard $15,000; Singles and doubles draws	(United Kingdom) Jonathan Gray; 7–6^{(7–4)}, 6–4	(Italy) Alessandro Bega	(Italy) Luca Prevosto (South Africa) Lance-Pierre du Toit	(Tunisia) Skander Mansouri (Switzerland) Loïc Perret (France) François-Arthur Vibert (France) Pierre Delage
October 15	Tunisia F36 Futures; Monastir, Tunisia; Hard $15,000; Singles and doubles draws	(Benin) Alexis Klégou (Tunisia) Skander Mansouri; 6–4, 6–0	(Russia) Petr Arkhipov (Russia) Bogdan Bobrov	(Italy) Luca Prevosto (South Africa) Lance-Pierre du Toit	(Tunisia) Skander Mansouri (Switzerland) Loïc Perret (France) François-Arthur Vibert (France) Pierre Delage
October 15	Turkey F32 Futures; Antalya, Turkey; Clay $15,000; Singles and doubles draws	(Italy) Riccardo Bonadio; 6–2, 7–6^{(7–4)}	(Italy) Dante Gennaro	(Italy) Antonio Massara (Bulgaria) Gabriel Donev	(Netherlands) Mick Veldheer (Romania) Edris Fetisleam (Germany) Paul Wörner (Czech Republic) Vít Kopřiva
October 15	Turkey F32 Futures; Antalya, Turkey; Clay $15,000; Singles and doubles draws	(Romania) Vasile-Alexandru Ghilea (Iran) Shahin Khaledan; 2–6, 6–2, [10–6]	(Italy) Riccardo Bonadio (Belgium) Jeroen Vanneste	(Italy) Antonio Massara (Bulgaria) Gabriel Donev	(Netherlands) Mick Veldheer (Romania) Edris Fetisleam (Germany) Paul Wörner (Czech Republic) Vít Kopřiva
October 22	Italy F33 Futures; Pula, Italy; Clay $25,000; Singles and doubles draws	(Italy) Raúl Brancaccio; 6–4, 6–4	(Bulgaria) Dimitar Kuzmanov	(Spain) Eduard Esteve Lobato (Spain) Pol Toledo Bagué	(Italy) Riccardo Balzerani (Italy) Davide Galoppini (Spain) Marc Giner (Romania) Nicolae Frunză
October 22	Italy F33 Futures; Pula, Italy; Clay $25,000; Singles and doubles draws	(Italy) Francesco Forti (Italy) Mattia Frinzi; 6–4, 3–6, [10–3]	(Romania) Alexandru Jecan (Romania) Luca George Tatomir	(Spain) Eduard Esteve Lobato (Spain) Pol Toledo Bagué	(Italy) Riccardo Balzerani (Italy) Davide Galoppini (Spain) Marc Giner (Romania) Nicolae Frunză
October 22	Portugal F22 Futures; Tavira, Portugal; Hard $25,000; Singles and doubles draws	(Portugal) João Monteiro; 6–3, 7–6^{(7–5)}	(Portugal) Fred Gil	(Portugal) Tiago Cação (Netherlands) Gijs Brouwer	(Sweden) Jakob Johansson-Holm (Switzerland) Raphael Baltensperger (Spain) Miguel Semmler (Portugal) Luís Faria
October 22	Portugal F22 Futures; Tavira, Portugal; Hard $25,000; Singles and doubles draws	(Switzerland) Luca Castelnuovo (United Kingdom) Luke Johnson; 4–6, 7–5, [10–3]	(Portugal) Francisco Cabral (Spain) Sergio Martos Gornés	(Portugal) Tiago Cação (Netherlands) Gijs Brouwer	(Sweden) Jakob Johansson-Holm (Switzerland) Raphael Baltensperger (Spain) Miguel Semmler (Portugal) Luís Faria
October 22	USA F28B Futures; Waco, United States; Hard (indoor) $25,000; Singles and doubles draws	(United States) Evan Zhu; 6–3, ret.	(United States) Roy Smith	(United States) Jonathan Chang (Chile) Matías Soto	(France) Maxime Cressy (United Kingdom) Jack Findel-Hawkins (France) Maxime Tchoutakian (United States) Trent Bryde
October 22	USA F28B Futures; Waco, United States; Hard (indoor) $25,000; Singles and doubles draws	(France) Maxime Cressy (United States) Nicolas Meister; 6–1, 6–4	(United States) John Paul Fruttero (United States) Danny Thomas	(United States) Jonathan Chang (Chile) Matías Soto	(France) Maxime Cressy (United Kingdom) Jack Findel-Hawkins (France) Maxime Tchoutakian (United States) Trent Bryde
October 22	Vietnam F4 Futures; Tây Ninh, Vietnam; Hard $25,000; Singles and doubles draws	(Russia) Roman Safiullin; 7–6^{(9–7)}, 6–4	(Vietnam) Lý Hoàng Nam	(Japan) Rio Noguchi (Sweden) Filip Bergevi	(France) Florian Lakat (Chinese Taipei) Hsu Yu-hsiou (United States) Paul Oosterbaan (New Zealand) Ajeet Rai
October 22	Vietnam F4 Futures; Tây Ninh, Vietnam; Hard $25,000; Singles and doubles draws	(Vietnam) Lê Quốc Khánh (Vietnam) Lý Hoàng Nam; 6–4, 6–7^{(6–8)}, [12–10]	(Philippines) Francis Alcantara (Sweden) Markus Eriksson	(Japan) Rio Noguchi (Sweden) Filip Bergevi	(France) Florian Lakat (Chinese Taipei) Hsu Yu-hsiou (United States) Paul Oosterbaan (New Zealand) Ajeet Rai
October 22	Brazil F6 Futures; Curitiba, Brazil; Clay $15,000; Singles and doubles draws	(Argentina) Francisco Cerúndolo; 7–6^{(7–3)}, 6–2	(Brazil) Felipe Meligeni Alves	(Chile) Alejandro Tabilo (Argentina) Maximiliano Estévez	(Ukraine) Daniil Zarichanskyy (Brazil) José Pereira (Brazil) Daniel Dutra da Silva (Brazil) João Souza
October 22	Brazil F6 Futures; Curitiba, Brazil; Clay $15,000; Singles and doubles draws	(Brazil) Bernardo Oliveira (Brazil) Eduardo Ribeiro; 4–6, 6–2, [11–9]	(Brazil) Felipe Meligeni Alves (Brazil) José Pereira	(Chile) Alejandro Tabilo (Argentina) Maximiliano Estévez	(Ukraine) Daniil Zarichanskyy (Brazil) José Pereira (Brazil) Daniel Dutra da Silva (Brazil) João Souza
October 22	Czech Republic F7 Futures; Liberec, Czech Republic; Carpet (indoor) $15,000; Singles and doubles draws	(Italy) Julian Ocleppo; 4–6, 6–3, 6–4	(Czech Republic) Michael Vrbenský	(Czech Republic) Petr Nouza (Netherlands) Niels Lootsma	(Czech Republic) Jan Mertl (Czech Republic) Filip Duda (Czech Republic) Antonín Štěpánek (Poland) Maciej Rajski
October 22	Czech Republic F7 Futures; Liberec, Czech Republic; Carpet (indoor) $15,000; Singles and doubles draws	(Czech Republic) Marek Gengel (Czech Republic) Petr Nouza; 2–6, 6–3, [10–3]	(Czech Republic) Jonáš Forejtek (Czech Republic) Jan Mertl	(Czech Republic) Petr Nouza (Netherlands) Niels Lootsma	(Czech Republic) Jan Mertl (Czech Republic) Filip Duda (Czech Republic) Antonín Štěpánek (Poland) Maciej Rajski
October 22	Egypt F24 Futures; Sharm El Sheikh, Egypt; Hard $15,000; Singles and doubles draws	(Egypt) Karim-Mohamed Maamoun; 4–6, 6–1, 6–4	(Austria) Alexander Erler	(Russia) Alexander Igoshin (Switzerland) Adam Moundir	(Russia) Alexander Zhurbin (Canada) Samuel Philp (Czech Republic) Petr Hájek (Russia) Alexey Zakharov
October 22	Egypt F24 Futures; Sharm El Sheikh, Egypt; Hard $15,000; Singles and doubles draws	(Russia) Shalva Dzhanashiya (Russia) Alexander Igoshin; 7–6^{(7–3)}, 6–4	(Lebanon) Giovani Samaha (Egypt) Issam Haitham Taweel	(Russia) Alexander Igoshin (Switzerland) Adam Moundir	(Russia) Alexander Zhurbin (Canada) Samuel Philp (Czech Republic) Petr Hájek (Russia) Alexey Zakharov
October 22	Germany F16 Futures; Hamburg, Germany; Hard (indoor) $15,000; Singles and doubles draws	(Turkey) Altuğ Çelikbilek; 6–2, 2–6, 6–4	(Germany) Louis Wessels	(Belgium) Christopher Heyman (Russia) Evgenii Tiurnev	(Italy) Giovanni Fonio (Germany) Dominik Böhler (Germany) Stefan Seifert (France) Arthur Reymond
October 22	Germany F16 Futures; Hamburg, Germany; Hard (indoor) $15,000; Singles and doubles draws	(Turkey) Altuğ Çelikbilek (Germany) Alexander Mannapov; 6–3, 1–6, [10–7]	(Belgium) Michael Geerts (Belgium) Christopher Heyman	(Belgium) Christopher Heyman (Russia) Evgenii Tiurnev	(Italy) Giovanni Fonio (Germany) Dominik Böhler (Germany) Stefan Seifert (France) Arthur Reymond
October 22	Tunisia F37 Futures; Monastir, Tunisia; Hard $15,000; Singles and doubles draws	(Tunisia) Aziz Dougaz; 6–3, 6–4	(France) Gabriel Petit	(Russia) Dimitriy Voronin (United States) Jeremy Sonkin	(Spain) Albert Roglan (Switzerland) Loïc Perret (France) Maxime Mora (Italy) Jannik Sinner
October 22	Tunisia F37 Futures; Monastir, Tunisia; Hard $15,000; Singles and doubles draws	(Benin) Alexis Klégou (Tunisia) Skander Mansouri; 6–2, 6–1	(Switzerland) Rémy Bertola (Switzerland) Yannik Steinegger	(Russia) Dimitriy Voronin (United States) Jeremy Sonkin	(Spain) Albert Roglan (Switzerland) Loïc Perret (France) Maxime Mora (Italy) Jannik Sinner
October 22	Turkey F33 Futures; Antalya, Turkey; Clay $15,000; Singles and doubles draws	(Spain) Jordi Samper Montaña; 0–6, 6–3, 6–4	(Italy) Riccardo Bonadio	(Russia) Ivan Nedelko (Germany) Peter Heller	(Italy) Dante Gennaro (Lebanon) Hady Habib (Slovenia) Nik Razboršek (Belgium) Jeroen Vanneste
October 22	Turkey F33 Futures; Antalya, Turkey; Clay $15,000; Singles and doubles draws	(Romania) Vasile Antonescu (Romania) Vasile-Alexandru Ghilea; 6–2, 6–2	(Germany) Peter Heller (Belgium) Jeroen Vanneste	(Russia) Ivan Nedelko (Germany) Peter Heller	(Italy) Dante Gennaro (Lebanon) Hady Habib (Slovenia) Nik Razboršek (Belgium) Jeroen Vanneste
October 29	Italy F34 Futures; Pula, Italy; Clay $25,000; Singles and doubles draws	(Italy) Riccardo Bonadio; 6–2, 7–5	(Brazil) Jordan Correia	(Bosnia and Herzegovina) Nerman Fatić (Italy) Marco Bortolotti	(Germany) Peter Torebko (Italy) Davide Galoppini (Romania) Alexandru Jecan (Spain) Pol Toledo Bagué
October 29	Italy F34 Futures; Pula, Italy; Clay $25,000; Singles and doubles draws	(Romania) Victor Vlad Cornea (Romania) Alexandru Jecan; 7–5, 2–6, [10–6]	(Italy) Marco Bortolotti (Brazil) Diego Matos	(Bosnia and Herzegovina) Nerman Fatić (Italy) Marco Bortolotti	(Germany) Peter Torebko (Italy) Davide Galoppini (Romania) Alexandru Jecan (Spain) Pol Toledo Bagué
October 29	Thailand F7 Futures; Nonthaburi, Thailand; Hard $25,000; Singles and doubles draws	(Russia) Konstantin Kravchuk; 6–3, 6–3	(South Korea) Song Min-kyu	(Thailand) Pruchya Isaro (South Korea) Hong Seong-chan	(Uzbekistan) Sanjar Fayziev (South Korea) Na Jung-woong (South Korea) Kim Jae-hwan (Japan) Hiroyasu Ehara
October 29	Thailand F7 Futures; Nonthaburi, Thailand; Hard $25,000; Singles and doubles draws	(Japan) Hiroyasu Ehara (Thailand) Pruchya Isaro; 6–2, 6–3	(Chinese Taipei) Meng Cing-yang (United Kingdom) Neil Pauffley	(Thailand) Pruchya Isaro (South Korea) Hong Seong-chan	(Uzbekistan) Sanjar Fayziev (South Korea) Na Jung-woong (South Korea) Kim Jae-hwan (Japan) Hiroyasu Ehara
October 29	Vietnam F5 Futures; Tây Ninh, Vietnam; Hard $25,000; Singles and doubles draws	(Russia) Roman Safiullin; 7–6^{(7–5)}, 6–4	(Vietnam) Lý Hoàng Nam	(Sweden) Filip Bergevi (Chinese Taipei) Yu Cheng-yu	(Switzerland) Antoine Bellier (India) Manish Sureshkumar (Germany) Robert Strombachs (New Zealand) Ajeet Rai
October 29	Vietnam F5 Futures; Tây Ninh, Vietnam; Hard $25,000; Singles and doubles draws	(Philippines) Francis Alcantara (Sweden) Markus Eriksson; 5–7, 6–4, [10–7]	(Vietnam) Lý Hoàng Nam (Russia) Roman Safiullin	(Sweden) Filip Bergevi (Chinese Taipei) Yu Cheng-yu	(Switzerland) Antoine Bellier (India) Manish Sureshkumar (Germany) Robert Strombachs (New Zealand) Ajeet Rai
October 29	Argentina F7 Futures; Corrientes, Argentina; Clay $15,000; Singles and doubles draws	(Argentina) Hernán Casanova; 6–4, 7–5	(Argentina) Manuel Peña López	(Peru) Conner Huertas del Pino (Argentina) Maximiliano Estévez	(Argentina) Agustín Velotti (Argentina) Guido Iván Justo (Argentina) Francisco Cerúndolo (Argentina) Mariano Kestelboim
October 29	Argentina F7 Futures; Corrientes, Argentina; Clay $15,000; Singles and doubles draws	(Peru) Alexander Merino (Argentina) Manuel Peña López; 4–6, 6–4, [10–7]	(Argentina) Mariano Kestelboim (Argentina) Agustín Velotti	(Peru) Conner Huertas del Pino (Argentina) Maximiliano Estévez	(Argentina) Agustín Velotti (Argentina) Guido Iván Justo (Argentina) Francisco Cerúndolo (Argentina) Mariano Kestelboim
October 29	Brazil F7 Futures; São Carlos, Brazil; Clay $15,000; Singles and doubles draws	(Brazil) João Souza; 6–3, 6–3	(Brazil) Felipe Meligeni Alves	(Brazil) João Lucas Reis da Silva (Argentina) Facundo Mena	(Brazil) Nicolas Santos (Brazil) Matheus Pucinelli de Almeida (Brazil) José Pereira (Chile) Alejandro Tabilo
October 29	Brazil F7 Futures; São Carlos, Brazil; Clay $15,000; Singles and doubles draws	(Brazil) Caio Silva (Brazil) Thales Turini; 7–6^{(7–5)}, 6–2	(Brazil) Oscar José Gutierrez (Brazil) Rafael Matos	(Brazil) João Lucas Reis da Silva (Argentina) Facundo Mena	(Brazil) Nicolas Santos (Brazil) Matheus Pucinelli de Almeida (Brazil) José Pereira (Chile) Alejandro Tabilo
October 29	Czech Republic F8 Futures; Opava, Czech Republic; Carpet (indoor) $15,000; Singles and doubles draws	(Czech Republic) Tomáš Macháč; 7–6^{(8–6)}, 7–5	(Czech Republic) Filip Duda	(Czech Republic) Michal Konečný (Czech Republic) Petr Nouza	(Slovakia) Michal Selecký (Netherlands) Niels Lootsma (Czech Republic) Jonáš Forejtek (Switzerland) Jakub Paul
October 29	Czech Republic F8 Futures; Opava, Czech Republic; Carpet (indoor) $15,000; Singles and doubles draws	(Czech Republic) Vít Kopřiva (Czech Republic) Jaroslav Pospíšil; 7–6^{(7–5)}, 6–4	(Poland) Karol Drzewiecki (Poland) Szymon Walków	(Czech Republic) Michal Konečný (Czech Republic) Petr Nouza	(Slovakia) Michal Selecký (Netherlands) Niels Lootsma (Czech Republic) Jonáš Forejtek (Switzerland) Jakub Paul
October 29	Egypt F25 Futures; Sharm El Sheikh, Egypt; Hard $15,000; Singles and doubles draws	(Russia) Alexander Zhurbin; 7–6^{(7–3)}, 6–2	(Egypt) Karim-Mohamed Maamoun	(Spain) José Francisco Vidal Azorín (Ukraine) Vladyslav Orlov	(Poland) Adrian Andrzejczuk (United States) Omni Kumar (Russia) Alexander Igoshin (United Kingdom) Mason Recci
October 29	Egypt F25 Futures; Sharm El Sheikh, Egypt; Hard $15,000; Singles and doubles draws	(Kazakhstan) Sagadat Ayap (Portugal) Francisco Dias; 7–6^{(7–4)}, 4–6, [10–2]	(Russia) Shalva Dzhanashiya (Russia) Alexander Igoshin	(Spain) José Francisco Vidal Azorín (Ukraine) Vladyslav Orlov	(Poland) Adrian Andrzejczuk (United States) Omni Kumar (Russia) Alexander Igoshin (United Kingdom) Mason Recci
October 29	Estonia F2 Futures; Tartu, Estonia; Carpet (indoor) $15,000; Singles and doubles draws	(Ukraine) Vladyslav Manafov; 7–5, 6–4	(Latvia) Mārtiņš Podžus	(Estonia) Vladimir Ivanov (Switzerland) Luca Castelnuovo	(France) Yanais Laurent (Estonia) Karl Kiur Saar (Russia) Alexander Vasilenko (Switzerland) Riccardo Maiga
October 29	Estonia F2 Futures; Tartu, Estonia; Carpet (indoor) $15,000; Singles and doubles draws	(Estonia) Vladimir Ivanov (Russia) Maxim Ratniuk; 6–4, 1–6, [10–4]	(Switzerland) Luca Castelnuovo (Bulgaria) Vasko Mladenov	(Estonia) Vladimir Ivanov (Switzerland) Luca Castelnuovo	(France) Yanais Laurent (Estonia) Karl Kiur Saar (Russia) Alexander Vasilenko (Switzerland) Riccardo Maiga
October 29	Greece F6 Futures; Heraklion, Greece; Hard $15,000; Singles and doubles draws	(France) Baptiste Crepatte; 7–5, 6–4	(United Kingdom) George Loffhagen	(Monaco) Lucas Catarina (Austria) David Pichler	(Italy) Francesco Ferrari (Italy) Samuele Ramazzotti (Israel) Shahar Elbaz (Greece) Michail Pervolarakis
October 29	Greece F6 Futures; Heraklion, Greece; Hard $15,000; Singles and doubles draws	(Italy) Francesco Ferrari (Greece) Michail Pervolarakis; 7–6^{(7–4)}, 6–0	(Monaco) Lucas Catarina (France) Baptiste Crepatte	(Monaco) Lucas Catarina (Austria) David Pichler	(Italy) Francesco Ferrari (Italy) Samuele Ramazzotti (Israel) Shahar Elbaz (Greece) Michail Pervolarakis
October 29	Kuwait F1 Futures; Mishref, Kuwait; Hard $15,000; Singles and doubles draws	(United Kingdom) Aidan McHugh; 6–2, 6–7^{(3–7)}, 6–2	(United States) Alec Adamson	(Germany) Peter Heller (Russia) Kristian Lozan	(Germany) Kai Wehnelt (Turkey) Ergi Kırkın (United States) Dennis Uspensky (Netherlands) Bart Stevens
October 29	Kuwait F1 Futures; Mishref, Kuwait; Hard $15,000; Singles and doubles draws	(Germany) Peter Heller (Germany) Kai Wehnelt; 6–3, 5–7, [10–7]	(United States) Alec Adamson (United States) Miles Seemann	(Germany) Peter Heller (Russia) Kristian Lozan	(Germany) Kai Wehnelt (Turkey) Ergi Kırkın (United States) Dennis Uspensky (Netherlands) Bart Stevens
October 29	Tunisia F38 Futures; Monastir, Tunisia; Hard $15,000; Singles and doubles draws	(France) Geoffrey Blancaneaux; 6–0, 6–1	(France) Ronan Joncour	(Tunisia) Skander Mansouri (Spain) David Jordà Sanchis	(France) Maxime Mora (Benin) Alexis Klégou (Netherlands) Daniel de Jonge (Italy) Luca Potenza
October 29	Tunisia F38 Futures; Monastir, Tunisia; Hard $15,000; Singles and doubles draws	(Russia) Petr Arkhipov (United States) Jeremy Sonkin; 7–6^{(8–6)}, 7–6^{(7–3)}	(Russia) Ivan Davydov (Germany) Niklas Schell	(Tunisia) Skander Mansouri (Spain) David Jordà Sanchis	(France) Maxime Mora (Benin) Alexis Klégou (Netherlands) Daniel de Jonge (Italy) Luca Potenza
October 29	Turkey F34 Futures; Antalya, Turkey; Clay $15,000; Singles and doubles draws	(Spain) Javier Barranco Cosano; 6–4, 6–1	(Hungary) Péter Nagy	(Russia) Ivan Nedelko (Belgium) Jeroen Vanneste	(Argentina) Facundo Juárez (Brazil) Wilson Leite (Russia) Mikhail Korovin (Australia) Christopher O'Connell
October 29	Turkey F34 Futures; Antalya, Turkey; Clay $15,000; Singles and doubles draws	(Spain) Javier Barranco Cosano (Spain) Benjamín Winter López; 7–6^{(7–3)}, 6–0	(Russia) Mikhail Korovin (Russia) Ivan Nedelko	(Russia) Ivan Nedelko (Belgium) Jeroen Vanneste	(Argentina) Facundo Juárez (Brazil) Wilson Leite (Russia) Mikhail Korovin (Australia) Christopher O'Connell
October 29	USA F29 Futures; Birmingham, United States; Clay $15,000; Singles and doubles draws	(Venezuela) Ricardo Rodríguez; 7–6^{(8–6)}, 6–4	(United States) Strong Kirchheimer	(Germany) Timo Stodder (United States) Justin Butsch	(Italy) Fabrizio Ornago (Spain) Òscar Mesquida Berg (Romania) Filip Cristian Jianu (Japan) Haru Inoue
October 29	USA F29 Futures; Birmingham, United States; Clay $15,000; Singles and doubles draws	(Germany) Timo Stodder (United States) Preston Touliatos; 6–4, 6–3	(United States) Robert Kelly (United States) Korey Lovett	(Germany) Timo Stodder (United States) Justin Butsch	(Italy) Fabrizio Ornago (Spain) Òscar Mesquida Berg (Romania) Filip Cristian Jianu (Japan) Haru Inoue

=== November ===
Week of	Tournament	Winner	Runners-up	Semifinalists	Quarterfinalists
November 5	Argentina F8 Futures; Buenos Aires, Argentina; Clay $15,000; Singles and doubles draws	(Argentina) Santiago Rodríguez Taverna; 3–6, 6–4, 6–4	(Argentina) Mariano Kestelboim	(Argentina) Facundo Mena (Argentina) Agustín Velotti	(Argentina) Maximiliano Estévez (Argentina) Nicolás Alberto Arreche (Italy) Andres Gabriel Ciurletti (Argentina) Leonardo Aboian
November 5	Argentina F8 Futures; Buenos Aires, Argentina; Clay $15,000; Singles and doubles draws	(Argentina) Maximiliano Estévez (Argentina) Mariano Kestelboim; 7–6^{(7–5)}, 6–2	(Argentina) Nicolás Alberto Arreche (Argentina) Guido Iván Justo	(Argentina) Facundo Mena (Argentina) Agustín Velotti	(Argentina) Maximiliano Estévez (Argentina) Nicolás Alberto Arreche (Italy) Andres Gabriel Ciurletti (Argentina) Leonardo Aboian
November 5	Brazil F8 Futures; São Paulo, Brazil; Clay $15,000; Singles and doubles draws	(Brazil) João Souza; 6–1, 7–6^{(7–4)}	(Sweden) Christian Lindell	(Brazil) Rafael Matos (Brazil) Nicolas Santos	(Brazil) Oscar José Gutierrez (Brazil) João Lucas Reis da Silva (Brazil) Carlos Eduardo Severino (Brazil) José Pereira
November 5	Brazil F8 Futures; São Paulo, Brazil; Clay $15,000; Singles and doubles draws	(Brazil) Oscar José Gutierrez (Brazil) Rafael Matos; 3–6, 7–5, [10–8]	(Brazil) Caio Silva (Brazil) Thales Turini	(Brazil) Rafael Matos (Brazil) Nicolas Santos	(Brazil) Oscar José Gutierrez (Brazil) João Lucas Reis da Silva (Brazil) Carlos Eduardo Severino (Brazil) José Pereira
November 5	Czech Republic F9 Futures; Valašské Meziříčí, Czech Republic; Hard (indoor) $15,000; Singles and doubles draws	(Poland) Karol Drzewiecki; 6–3, 6–4	(Czech Republic) Jonáš Forejtek	(Poland) Maciej Rajski (Netherlands) Niels Lootsma	(Czech Republic) Ondřej Krstev (Czech Republic) Petr Nouza (Czech Republic) Petr Michnev (Russia) Richard Muzaev
November 5	Czech Republic F9 Futures; Valašské Meziříčí, Czech Republic; Hard (indoor) $15,000; Singles and doubles draws	(Poland) Karol Drzewiecki (Czech Republic) Petr Nouza; 6–2, 6–1	(Netherlands) Niels Lootsma (Netherlands) Glenn Smits	(Poland) Maciej Rajski (Netherlands) Niels Lootsma	(Czech Republic) Ondřej Krstev (Czech Republic) Petr Nouza (Czech Republic) Petr Michnev (Russia) Richard Muzaev
November 5	Egypt F26 Futures; Sharm El Sheikh, Egypt; Hard $15,000; Singles and doubles draws	(Spain) David Pérez Sanz; 6–3, 2–6, 7–6^{(7–0)}	(Netherlands) Ryan Nijboer	(Switzerland) Johan Nikles (Netherlands) Jesper de Jong	(United States) Josh Silverstein (Netherlands) Michiel de Krom (Italy) Simone Roncalli (Switzerland) Adam Moundir
November 5	Egypt F26 Futures; Sharm El Sheikh, Egypt; Hard $15,000; Singles and doubles draws	(Venezuela) Jordi Muñoz Abreu (Spain) David Pérez Sanz; 6–2, 6–0	(Poland) Adrian Andrzejczuk (Switzerland) Johan Nikles	(Switzerland) Johan Nikles (Netherlands) Jesper de Jong	(United States) Josh Silverstein (Netherlands) Michiel de Krom (Italy) Simone Roncalli (Switzerland) Adam Moundir
November 5	Estonia F3 Futures; Pärnu, Estonia; Hard (indoor) $15,000; Singles and doubles draws	(Russia) Evgenii Tiurnev; 4–6, 6–4, 6–3	(Ukraine) Vladyslav Manafov	(Latvia) Mārtiņš Podžus (Belarus) Sergey Betov	(United Kingdom) Joshua Paris (Belarus) Aliaksandr Liaonenka (Estonia) Vladimir Ivanov (Russia) Alexander Vasilenko
November 5	Estonia F3 Futures; Pärnu, Estonia; Hard (indoor) $15,000; Singles and doubles draws	(Latvia) Jānis Podžus (Latvia) Mārtiņš Podžus; 6–3, 6–4	(Estonia) Vladimir Ivanov (Russia) Maxim Ratniuk	(Latvia) Mārtiņš Podžus (Belarus) Sergey Betov	(United Kingdom) Joshua Paris (Belarus) Aliaksandr Liaonenka (Estonia) Vladimir Ivanov (Russia) Alexander Vasilenko
November 5	Greece F7 Futures; Heraklion, Greece; Hard $15,000; Singles and doubles draws	(France) Baptiste Crepatte; 6–1, 7–6^{(7–4)}	(Slovenia) Tom Kočevar-Dešman	(Czech Republic) Vít Kopřiva (Greece) Michail Pervolarakis	(United Kingdom) George Loffhagen (Austria) David Pichler (Russia) Markos Kalovelonis (Monaco) Lucas Catarina
November 5	Greece F7 Futures; Heraklion, Greece; Hard $15,000; Singles and doubles draws	(Italy) Francesco Ferrari (Greece) Michail Pervolarakis; 6–3, 6–3	(Czech Republic) Vít Kopřiva (Austria) David Pichler	(Czech Republic) Vít Kopřiva (Greece) Michail Pervolarakis	(United Kingdom) George Loffhagen (Austria) David Pichler (Russia) Markos Kalovelonis (Monaco) Lucas Catarina
November 5	Kuwait F2 Futures; Mishref, Kuwait; Hard $15,000; Singles and doubles draws	(Germany) Peter Heller; 6–4, 6–3	(France) Constantin Bittoun Kouzmine	(Japan) Daisuke Sumizawa (Poland) Michał Dembek	(Ecuador) Antonio Cayetano March (Turkey) Ergi Kırkın (India) Adil Kalyanpur (Poland) Maciej Smoła
November 5	Kuwait F2 Futures; Mishref, Kuwait; Hard $15,000; Singles and doubles draws	(United States) Alec Adamson (United States) Miles Seemann; 6–4, 7–6^{(7–5)}	(United Kingdom) Jonathan Binding (Netherlands) Roy Sarut de Valk	(Japan) Daisuke Sumizawa (Poland) Michał Dembek	(Ecuador) Antonio Cayetano March (Turkey) Ergi Kırkın (India) Adil Kalyanpur (Poland) Maciej Smoła
November 5	Mozambique F1 Futures; Maputo, Mozambique; Hard $15,000; Singles and doubles draws	(Argentina) Matías Franco Descotte; 7–6^{(8–6)}, 6–2	(Zimbabwe) Benjamin Lock	(Iran) Hamid Nadaf (United States) Tyler Lu	(Russia) Yan Bondarevskiy (South Africa) Lance-Pierre du Toit (United Kingdom) Isaac Stoute (United States) William Bushamuka
November 5	Mozambique F1 Futures; Maputo, Mozambique; Hard $15,000; Singles and doubles draws	(Zimbabwe) Benjamin Lock (Zimbabwe) Courtney John Lock; 5–7, 6–3, [10–4]	(United States) Luke Jacob Gamble (United States) Tyler Lu	(Iran) Hamid Nadaf (United States) Tyler Lu	(Russia) Yan Bondarevskiy (South Africa) Lance-Pierre du Toit (United Kingdom) Isaac Stoute (United States) William Bushamuka
November 5	Thailand F8 Futures; Nonthaburi, Thailand; Hard $15,000; Singles and doubles draws	(Russia) Roman Safiullin; 7–5, 4–6, 6–4	(Uzbekistan) Sanjar Fayziev	(Switzerland) Antoine Bellier (Russia) Konstantin Kravchuk	(India) Abhinav Sanjeev Shanmugam (Japan) Takashi Saito (Chinese Taipei) Lee Kuan-yi (Israel) Or Ram-Harel
November 5	Thailand F8 Futures; Nonthaburi, Thailand; Hard $15,000; Singles and doubles draws	(Chinese Taipei) Hsu Yu-hsiou (Chinese Taipei) Yu Cheng-yu; 6–1, 6–0	(Philippines) Francis Alcantara (Portugal) Bernardo Saraiva	(Switzerland) Antoine Bellier (Russia) Konstantin Kravchuk	(India) Abhinav Sanjeev Shanmugam (Japan) Takashi Saito (Chinese Taipei) Lee Kuan-yi (Israel) Or Ram-Harel
November 5	Tunisia F39 Futures; Monastir, Tunisia; Hard $15,000; Singles and doubles draws	(Russia) Ivan Gakhov; 3–6, 6–2, 6–1	(Canada) Steven Diez	(Italy) Alessandro Bega (Spain) Andrés Fernández Cánovas	(France) Ronan Joncour (Argentina) Franco Emanuel Egea (Italy) Marco Miceli (France) Matthieu Perchicot
November 5	Tunisia F39 Futures; Monastir, Tunisia; Hard $15,000; Singles and doubles draws	(Italy) Marco Bortolotti (Brazil) Diego Matos; 6–4, 6–3	(Sweden) Jakob Johansson-Holm (Germany) Michael Weindl	(Italy) Alessandro Bega (Spain) Andrés Fernández Cánovas	(France) Ronan Joncour (Argentina) Franco Emanuel Egea (Italy) Marco Miceli (France) Matthieu Perchicot
November 5	Turkey F35 Futures; Antalya, Turkey; Clay $15,000; Singles and doubles draws	(Slovenia) Nik Razboršek; 6–4, 6–4	(Brazil) Bruno Sant'Anna	(Belgium) Jeroen Vanneste (Spain) Javier Barranco Cosano	(Turkey) Cengiz Aksu (Brazil) Wilson Leite (Spain) Pol Toledo Bagué (Brazil) Jordan Correia
November 5	Turkey F35 Futures; Antalya, Turkey; Clay $15,000; Singles and doubles draws	(Brazil) Wilson Leite (Brazil) Bruno Sant'Anna; 6–4, 6–4	(Spain) Javier Barranco Cosano (Spain) Jaume Pla Malfeito	(Belgium) Jeroen Vanneste (Spain) Javier Barranco Cosano	(Turkey) Cengiz Aksu (Brazil) Wilson Leite (Spain) Pol Toledo Bagué (Brazil) Jordan Correia
November 5	USA F30 Futures; Niceville, United States; Clay $15,000; Singles and doubles draws	(Colombia) Nicolás Mejía; 6–4, 6–4	(United States) Strong Kirchheimer	(Italy) Fabrizio Ornago (United States) Justin Butsch	(United States) Trevor Allen Johnson (Argentina) Alan Kohen (United States) Trent Bryde (Romania) Dragoș Constantin Ignat
November 5	USA F30 Futures; Niceville, United States; Clay $15,000; Singles and doubles draws	(United States) Trevor Allen Johnson (United States) Patrick Kawka; 7–6^{(7–5)}, 6–4	(Republic of Ireland) Julian Bradley (United States) Justin Butsch	(Italy) Fabrizio Ornago (United States) Justin Butsch	(United States) Trevor Allen Johnson (Argentina) Alan Kohen (United States) Trent Bryde (Romania) Dragoș Constantin Ignat
November 12	Finland F4 Futures; Helsinki, Finland; Hard (indoor) $25,000; Singles and doubles draws	(Belgium) Christopher Heyman; 7–5, 6–3	(Russia) Evgenii Tiurnev	(Belgium) Maxime Pauwels (Sweden) Karl Friberg	(Finland) Otto Virtanen (Switzerland) Marc-Andrea Hüsler (Latvia) Mārtiņš Podžus (Germany) Louis Wessels
November 12	Finland F4 Futures; Helsinki, Finland; Hard (indoor) $25,000; Singles and doubles draws	(Germany) Patrick Mayer (Russia) Alexander Vasilenko; 7–6^{(7–5)}, 6–3	(Finland) Otto Virtanen (Germany) Louis Wessels	(Belgium) Maxime Pauwels (Sweden) Karl Friberg	(Finland) Otto Virtanen (Switzerland) Marc-Andrea Hüsler (Latvia) Mārtiņš Podžus (Germany) Louis Wessels
November 12	USA F31 Futures; Norman, United States; Hard $25,000; Singles and doubles draws	(Netherlands) Gijs Brouwer; 6–3, 6–2	(Czech Republic) Matěj Vocel	(United States) Jordi Arconada (Czech Republic) Dominik Kellovský	(United Kingdom) Ryan Peniston (Romania) Vasile-Alexandru Ghilea (United Kingdom) Andrew Watson (United States) Evan Zhu
November 12	USA F31 Futures; Norman, United States; Hard $25,000; Singles and doubles draws	(Netherlands) Gijs Brouwer (United States) Justin Butsch; 6–3, 2–6, [10–5]	(Czech Republic) Dominik Kellovský (Czech Republic) Matěj Vocel	(United States) Jordi Arconada (Czech Republic) Dominik Kellovský	(United Kingdom) Ryan Peniston (Romania) Vasile-Alexandru Ghilea (United Kingdom) Andrew Watson (United States) Evan Zhu
November 12	Argentina F9 Futures; Río Cuarto, Argentina; Clay $15,000; Singles and doubles draws	(Argentina) Mariano Kestelboim; 6–2, 5–7, 6–2	(Argentina) Maximiliano Estévez	(Brazil) José Pereira (Argentina) Juan Pablo Paz	(Argentina) Santiago Besada (Argentina) Federico Moreno (Argentina) Santiago Rodríguez Taverna (Argentina) Guido Iván Justo
November 12	Argentina F9 Futures; Río Cuarto, Argentina; Clay $15,000; Singles and doubles draws	(Argentina) Gabriel Alejandro Hidalgo (Argentina) Federico Moreno; 3–6, 6–3, [12–10]	(Peru) Conner Huertas del Pino (Peru) Alexander Merino	(Brazil) José Pereira (Argentina) Juan Pablo Paz	(Argentina) Santiago Besada (Argentina) Federico Moreno (Argentina) Santiago Rodríguez Taverna (Argentina) Guido Iván Justo
November 12	Brazil F9 Futures; Ribeirão Preto, Brazil; Clay $15,000; Singles and doubles draws	(Brazil) João Souza; 4–6, 6–4, 3–0, ret.	(Sweden) Christian Lindell	(Brazil) Alex Blumenberg (Brazil) Daniel Dutra da Silva	(Brazil) João Lucas Reis da Silva (Brazil) Carlos Eduardo Severino (Switzerland) Aaron Schmid (Brazil) Fernando Yamacita
November 12	Brazil F9 Futures; Ribeirão Preto, Brazil; Clay $15,000; Singles and doubles draws	(Brazil) João Lucas Reis da Silva (Brazil) Fernando Yamacita; 6–1, 7–6^{(7–3)}	(Brazil) Rafael Matos (Brazil) André Miele	(Brazil) Alex Blumenberg (Brazil) Daniel Dutra da Silva	(Brazil) João Lucas Reis da Silva (Brazil) Carlos Eduardo Severino (Switzerland) Aaron Schmid (Brazil) Fernando Yamacita
November 12	Chile F1 Futures; Viña del Mar, Chile; Clay $15,000; Singles and doubles draws	(Peru) Mauricio Echazú; 6–1, 6–2	(Chile) Juan Carlos Sáez	(Argentina) Mateo Nicolás Martínez (Chile) Alejandro Tabilo	(Chile) Víctor Núñez (Chile) Michel Vernier (Peru) Arklon Huertas del Pino (Switzerland) Mirko Martinez
November 12	Chile F1 Futures; Viña del Mar, Chile; Clay $15,000; Singles and doubles draws	(Argentina) Mateo Nicolás Martínez (Chile) Juan Carlos Sáez; 6–3, 7–6^{(7–0)}	(Peru) Mauricio Echazú (Peru) Jorge Panta	(Argentina) Mateo Nicolás Martínez (Chile) Alejandro Tabilo	(Chile) Víctor Núñez (Chile) Michel Vernier (Peru) Arklon Huertas del Pino (Switzerland) Mirko Martinez
November 12	Czech Republic F10 Futures; Milovice, Czech Republic; Hard (indoor) $15,000; Singles and doubles draws	(Czech Republic) Tomáš Macháč; 6–2, 6–2	(Germany) Christoph Negritu	(Czech Republic) Michael Vrbenský (Czech Republic) Ondřej Krstev	(Czech Republic) Petr Hájek (Czech Republic) Marek Gengel (Poland) Szymon Walków (Czech Republic) David Poljak
November 12	Czech Republic F10 Futures; Milovice, Czech Republic; Hard (indoor) $15,000; Singles and doubles draws	(Poland) Karol Drzewiecki (Poland) Szymon Walków; 5–7, 7–6^{(9–7)}, [15–13]	(Czech Republic) Dominik Langmajer (Czech Republic) Daniel Lustig	(Czech Republic) Michael Vrbenský (Czech Republic) Ondřej Krstev	(Czech Republic) Petr Hájek (Czech Republic) Marek Gengel (Poland) Szymon Walków (Czech Republic) David Poljak
November 12	Egypt F27 Futures; Sharm El Sheikh, Egypt; Hard $15,000; Singles and doubles draws	(Spain) David Pérez Sanz; 6–7^{(5–7)}, 6–3, 6–3	(Switzerland) Adam Moundir	(Croatia) Duje Ajduković (Switzerland) Johan Nikles	(Netherlands) Ryan Nijboer (Poland) Kacper Żuk (Italy) Moritz Trocker (Germany) Jannis Kahlke
November 12	Egypt F27 Futures; Sharm El Sheikh, Egypt; Hard $15,000; Singles and doubles draws	(Venezuela) Jordi Muñoz Abreu (Spain) David Pérez Sanz; 6–2, 6–4	(Bahrain) Ali Dawani (Switzerland) Adam Moundir	(Croatia) Duje Ajduković (Switzerland) Johan Nikles	(Netherlands) Ryan Nijboer (Poland) Kacper Żuk (Italy) Moritz Trocker (Germany) Jannis Kahlke
November 12	Greece F8 Futures; Heraklion, Greece; Hard $15,000; Singles and doubles draws	(Slovenia) Tom Kočevar-Dešman; 7–6^{(7–1)}, 6–2	(Czech Republic) Vít Kopřiva	(Russia) Bogdan Bobrov (Greece) Michail Pervolarakis	(Monaco) Lucas Catarina (United States) Austin Rapp (Russia) Markos Kalovelonis (Italy) Erik Crepaldi
November 12	Greece F8 Futures; Heraklion, Greece; Hard $15,000; Singles and doubles draws	(Czech Republic) Vít Kopřiva (Austria) David Pichler; 6–2, 4–6, [10–7]	(Russia) Markos Kalovelonis (Greece) Petros Tsitsipas	(Russia) Bogdan Bobrov (Greece) Michail Pervolarakis	(Monaco) Lucas Catarina (United States) Austin Rapp (Russia) Markos Kalovelonis (Italy) Erik Crepaldi
November 12	Kuwait F3 Futures; Mishref, Kuwait; Hard $15,000; Singles and doubles draws	(United Kingdom) Aidan McHugh; 6–1, 6–3	(France) Constantin Bittoun Kouzmine	(Italy) Julian Ocleppo (Germany) Kai Wehnelt	(Italy) Alessandro Bega (Netherlands) Roy de Valk (United Kingdom) Jonathan Binding (United States) Alec Adamson
November 12	Kuwait F3 Futures; Mishref, Kuwait; Hard $15,000; Singles and doubles draws	(United Kingdom) Jonathan Binding (Netherlands) Roy de Valk; 6–3, 6–4	(United States) Alec Adamson (United States) Miles Seemann	(Italy) Julian Ocleppo (Germany) Kai Wehnelt	(Italy) Alessandro Bega (Netherlands) Roy de Valk (United Kingdom) Jonathan Binding (United States) Alec Adamson
November 12	Mozambique F2 Futures; Maputo, Mozambique; Hard $15,000; Singles and doubles draws	(Argentina) Matías Franco Descotte; 6–2, 6–3	(Zimbabwe) Benjamin Lock	(United States) Tyler Lu (Republic of Ireland) Simon Carr	(United Kingdom) Isaac Stoute (Canada) Kelsey Stevenson (South Africa) Lance-Pierre du Toit (United States) Jeremy Sonkin
November 12	Mozambique F2 Futures; Maputo, Mozambique; Hard $15,000; Singles and doubles draws	(United States) Luke Jacob Gamble (United States) Tyler Lu; 5–7, 6–3, [10–6]	(Zimbabwe) Benjamin Lock (Zimbabwe) Courtney John Lock	(United States) Tyler Lu (Republic of Ireland) Simon Carr	(United Kingdom) Isaac Stoute (Canada) Kelsey Stevenson (South Africa) Lance-Pierre du Toit (United States) Jeremy Sonkin
November 12	Thailand F9 Futures; Nonthaburi, Thailand; Hard $15,000; Singles and doubles draws	(Russia) Konstantin Kravchuk; 7–5, 6–2	(Chinese Taipei) Lee Kuan-yi	(Russia) Roman Safiullin (Chinese Taipei) Hsu Yu-hsiou	(Bulgaria) Alexandar Lazarov (United States) Adam El Mihdawy (Japan) Ryota Tanuma (Chinese Taipei) Yu Cheng-yu
November 12	Thailand F9 Futures; Nonthaburi, Thailand; Hard $15,000; Singles and doubles draws	(Thailand) Pruchya Isaro (South Korea) Song Min-kyu; 6–3, 4–6, [13–11]	(Chinese Taipei) Chen Ti (Japan) Sora Fukuda	(Russia) Roman Safiullin (Chinese Taipei) Hsu Yu-hsiou	(Bulgaria) Alexandar Lazarov (United States) Adam El Mihdawy (Japan) Ryota Tanuma (Chinese Taipei) Yu Cheng-yu
November 12	Tunisia F40 Futures; Monastir, Tunisia; Hard $15,000; Singles and doubles draws	(Russia) Ivan Gakhov; 7–6^{(9–7)}, 7–5	(France) Ronan Joncour	(Italy) Marco Bortolotti (France) Matthieu Perchicot	(Belgium) Simon Beaupain (Russia) Ivan Davydov (Italy) Luca Giacomini (Canada) Steven Diez
November 12	Tunisia F40 Futures; Monastir, Tunisia; Hard $15,000; Singles and doubles draws	(Canada) Steven Diez (Spain) Sergio Martos Gornés; 6–3, 6–1	(Belarus) Mikalai Haliak (Belarus) Alexander Zgirovsky	(Italy) Marco Bortolotti (France) Matthieu Perchicot	(Belgium) Simon Beaupain (Russia) Ivan Davydov (Italy) Luca Giacomini (Canada) Steven Diez
November 12	Turkey F36 Futures; Antalya, Turkey; Clay $15,000; Singles and doubles draws	(Bosnia and Herzegovina) Nerman Fatić; 6–2, 6–0	(Italy) Dante Gennaro	(France) Rayane Roumane (Slovenia) Nik Razboršek	(Romania) Vlad Andrei Dancu (Serbia) Dejan Katić (Russia) Dimitriy Voronin (Bulgaria) Gabriel Donev
November 12	Turkey F36 Futures; Antalya, Turkey; Clay $15,000; Singles and doubles draws	(Bosnia and Herzegovina) Nerman Fatić (Italy) Davide Galoppini; 6–1, 6–2	(Belgium) Benjamin D'Hoe (Germany) Flemming Peters	(France) Rayane Roumane (Slovenia) Nik Razboršek	(Romania) Vlad Andrei Dancu (Serbia) Dejan Katić (Russia) Dimitriy Voronin (Bulgaria) Gabriel Donev
November 12	USA F32 Futures; Pensacola, United States; Clay $15,000; Singles and doubles draws	(Portugal) Nuno Borges; 6–4, 6–3	(Venezuela) Ricardo Rodríguez	(United States) Isaiah Strode (Kazakhstan) Dmitry Popko	(Jamaica) Rowland Phillips (Russia) Sergey Belov (Romania) Filip Cristian Jianu (United States) Patrick Daciek
November 12	USA F32 Futures; Pensacola, United States; Clay $15,000; Singles and doubles draws	(Colombia) Felipe Mantilla (Dominican Republic) José Olivares; 6–4, 6–4	(Republic of Ireland) Julian Bradley (Antigua and Barbuda) Jody Maginley	(United States) Isaiah Strode (Kazakhstan) Dmitry Popko	(Jamaica) Rowland Phillips (Russia) Sergey Belov (Romania) Filip Cristian Jianu (United States) Patrick Daciek
November 19	USA F33 Futures; Columbus, United States; Hard (indoor) $25,000; Singles and doubles draws	(Spain) Roberto Ortega Olmedo; 3–6, 6–2, 6–2	(United Kingdom) Jack Findel-Hawkins	(United Kingdom) Andrew Watson (France) Maxime Cressy	(United States) Kyle Seelig (United States) Jonathan Chang (Canada) Pavel Krainik (United States) Jenson Brooksby
November 19	USA F33 Futures; Columbus, United States; Hard (indoor) $25,000; Singles and doubles draws	(United Kingdom) Jack Findel-Hawkins (United States) Korey Lovett; 4–6, 6–4, [10–7]	(United States) Alex Kobelt (Japan) James Kent Trotter	(United Kingdom) Andrew Watson (France) Maxime Cressy	(United States) Kyle Seelig (United States) Jonathan Chang (Canada) Pavel Krainik (United States) Jenson Brooksby
November 19	Chile F2 Futures; Santiago, Chile; Clay $15,000; Singles and doubles draws	(Argentina) Facundo Mena; 6–4, 6–4	(Chile) Bastián Malla	(Argentina) Tomás Martín Etcheverry (Chile) Alejandro Tabilo	(Argentina) Genaro Alberto Olivieri (Argentina) Nicolás Alberto Arreche (Peru) Arklon Huertas del Pino (Argentina) Matías Zukas
November 19	Chile F2 Futures; Santiago, Chile; Clay $15,000; Singles and doubles draws	(Argentina) Juan Pablo Paz (Argentina) Santiago Rodríguez Taverna; 6–4, 6–4	(Argentina) Tomás Martín Etcheverry (Argentina) Matías Zukas	(Argentina) Tomás Martín Etcheverry (Chile) Alejandro Tabilo	(Argentina) Genaro Alberto Olivieri (Argentina) Nicolás Alberto Arreche (Peru) Arklon Huertas del Pino (Argentina) Matías Zukas
November 19	Czech Republic F11 Futures; Říčany, Czech Republic; Hard (indoor) $15,000; Singles and doubles draws	(Czech Republic) Tomáš Macháč; Walkover	(Czech Republic) Jiří Lehečka	(Czech Republic) Ondřej Štyler (Russia) Artem Dubrivnyy	(Belgium) Maxime Pauwels (Canada) Kelsey Stevenson (Poland) Wojciech Marek (Czech Republic) Robin Staněk
November 19	Czech Republic F11 Futures; Říčany, Czech Republic; Hard (indoor) $15,000; Singles and doubles draws	(Czech Republic) Jiří Jeníček (Czech Republic) Vojtěch Vlkovský; 6–4, 7–5	(Czech Republic) Jiří Barnat (Czech Republic) Jiří Lehečka	(Czech Republic) Ondřej Štyler (Russia) Artem Dubrivnyy	(Belgium) Maxime Pauwels (Canada) Kelsey Stevenson (Poland) Wojciech Marek (Czech Republic) Robin Staněk
November 19	Egypt F28 Futures; Sharm El Sheikh, Egypt; Hard $15,000; Singles and doubles draws	(Spain) David Pérez Sanz; 6–1, 6–1	(Netherlands) Ryan Nijboer	(Switzerland) Adam Moundir (Tunisia) Aziz Dougaz	(Poland) Kacper Żuk (Japan) Rimpei Kawakami (Belarus) Martin Borisiouk (San Marino) Marco De Rossi
November 19	Egypt F28 Futures; Sharm El Sheikh, Egypt; Hard $15,000; Singles and doubles draws	(Venezuela) Jordi Muñoz Abreu (Spain) David Pérez Sanz; 6–3, 6–2	(Egypt) Adham Gaber (Poland) Kacper Żuk	(Switzerland) Adam Moundir (Tunisia) Aziz Dougaz	(Poland) Kacper Żuk (Japan) Rimpei Kawakami (Belarus) Martin Borisiouk (San Marino) Marco De Rossi
November 19	Panama F4 Futures; Panama City, Panama; Clay $15,000; Singles and doubles draws	(Argentina) Maximiliano Estévez; 6–3, 6–3	(Switzerland) Mirko Martinez	(Argentina) Matías Franco Descotte (Ukraine) Daniil Zarichanskyy	(Peru) Conner Huertas del Pino (Argentina) Ignacio Carou (Ukraine) Ivan Sergeyev (Venezuela) Ricardo Rodríguez
November 19	Panama F4 Futures; Panama City, Panama; Clay $15,000; Singles and doubles draws	(Switzerland) Adrien Bossel (Switzerland) Mirko Martinez; 6–4, 6–2	(Colombia) Juan Sebastián Gómez (Antigua and Barbuda) Jody Maginley	(Argentina) Matías Franco Descotte (Ukraine) Daniil Zarichanskyy	(Peru) Conner Huertas del Pino (Argentina) Ignacio Carou (Ukraine) Ivan Sergeyev (Venezuela) Ricardo Rodríguez
November 19	South Africa F1 Futures; Stellenbosch, South Africa; Hard $15,000; Singles and doubles draws	(France) Geoffrey Blancaneaux; 6–4, 6–0	(Germany) Sebastian Prechtel	(Poland) Maciej Smoła (Réunion) Quentin Robert	(South Africa) Lance-Pierre du Toit (United Kingdom) Toby Martin (Hungary) Péter Nagy (Germany) Mats Rosenkranz
November 19	South Africa F1 Futures; Stellenbosch, South Africa; Hard $15,000; Singles and doubles draws	(Hungary) Gábor Borsos (Hungary) Péter Nagy; 6–3, 7–6^{(7–4)}	(United States) Connor Farren (United States) Christian Langmo	(Poland) Maciej Smoła (Réunion) Quentin Robert	(South Africa) Lance-Pierre du Toit (United Kingdom) Toby Martin (Hungary) Péter Nagy (Germany) Mats Rosenkranz
November 19	Tunisia F41 Futures; Monastir, Tunisia; Hard $15,000; Singles and doubles draws	(Russia) Aslan Karatsev; 6–4, 6–3	(Russia) Ivan Gakhov	(Russia) Savriyan Danilov (Tunisia) Moez Echargui	(United States) Michael Zhu (France) Alexandre Müller (Netherlands) Stephan Gerritsen (Germany) Paul Wörner
November 19	Tunisia F41 Futures; Monastir, Tunisia; Hard $15,000; Singles and doubles draws	(Belarus) Ivan Liutarevich (Ukraine) Vadym Ursu; 6–2, 6–7^{(3–7)}, [10–8]	(Portugal) Fred Gil (Brazil) Diego Matos	(Russia) Savriyan Danilov (Tunisia) Moez Echargui	(United States) Michael Zhu (France) Alexandre Müller (Netherlands) Stephan Gerritsen (Germany) Paul Wörner
November 19	Turkey F37 Futures; Antalya, Turkey; Clay $15,000; Singles and doubles draws	(Romania) Edris Fetisleam; 7–6^{(10–8)}, 6–1	(Italy) Dante Gennaro	(Bulgaria) Gabriel Donev (Serbia) Dejan Katić	(France) Rayane Roumane (Austria) Thomas Statzberger (Spain) Eduard Esteve Lobato (Argentina) Facundo Juárez
November 19	Turkey F37 Futures; Antalya, Turkey; Clay $15,000; Singles and doubles draws	(Italy) Dante Gennaro (Argentina) Facundo Juárez; 3–6, 6–3, [10–8]	(Romania) Vlad Andrei Dancu (Romania) Edris Fetisleam	(Bulgaria) Gabriel Donev (Serbia) Dejan Katić	(France) Rayane Roumane (Austria) Thomas Statzberger (Spain) Eduard Esteve Lobato (Argentina) Facundo Juárez
November 26	Cameroon F1 Futures; Yaoundé, Cameroon; Hard $25,000; Singles and doubles draws	(Tunisia) Skander Mansouri; 3–6, 6–3, 6–4	(France) Evan Furness	(Brazil) Igor São Thiago (France) Lény Mitjana	(India) Jatin Dahiya (India) Kunal Anand (Sweden) Simon Yitbarek (France) Corentin Denolly
November 26	Cameroon F1 Futures; Yaoundé, Cameroon; Hard $25,000; Singles and doubles draws	(Tunisia) Aziz Dougaz (Tunisia) Skander Mansouri; 6–4, 6–7^{(5–7)}, [10–8]	(France) Sadio Doumbia (Brazil) Diego Matos	(Brazil) Igor São Thiago (France) Lény Mitjana	(India) Jatin Dahiya (India) Kunal Anand (Sweden) Simon Yitbarek (France) Corentin Denolly
November 26	USA F34 Futures; Waco, United States; Hard (indoor) $25,000; Singles and doubles draws	(Belgium) Michael Geerts; 6–2, 4–6, 6–4	(France) Maxime Cressy	(United States) Jenson Brooksby (United States) Jacob Dunbar	(United States) Nick Chappell (United States) Martin Redlicki (France) Alexis Gautier (Hungary) Máté Zsiga
November 26	USA F34 Futures; Waco, United States; Hard (indoor) $25,000; Singles and doubles draws	(France) Maxime Cressy (United States) Nicolas Meister; 7–6^{(7–2)}, 7–6^{(9–7)}	(Romania) Vasile-Alexandru Ghilea (United States) Robert Kelly	(United States) Jenson Brooksby (United States) Jacob Dunbar	(United States) Nick Chappell (United States) Martin Redlicki (France) Alexis Gautier (Hungary) Máté Zsiga
November 26	Chile F3 Futures; Antofagasta, Chile; Clay $15,000; Singles and doubles draws	(Argentina) Facundo Mena; 6–1, 4–6, 6–1	(Argentina) Gabriel Alejandro Hidalgo	(Argentina) Matías Zukas (Chile) Michel Vernier	(Argentina) Manuel Peña López (Chile) Bastián Malla (Argentina) Tomás Martín Etcheverry (Argentina) Genaro Alberto Olivieri
November 26	Chile F3 Futures; Antofagasta, Chile; Clay $15,000; Singles and doubles draws	(Argentina) Juan Ignacio Galarza (Argentina) Mariano Kestelboim; 7–6^{(7–5)}, 6–1	(Argentina) Luciano Doria (Argentina) Manuel Peña López	(Argentina) Matías Zukas (Chile) Michel Vernier	(Argentina) Manuel Peña López (Chile) Bastián Malla (Argentina) Tomás Martín Etcheverry (Argentina) Genaro Alberto Olivieri
November 26	Czech Republic F12 Futures; Prague, Czech Republic; Hard (indoor) $15,000; Singles and doubles draws	(Spain) Andrés Artuñedo; 6–1, 7–6^{(7–1)}	(Czech Republic) Michal Konečný	(Czech Republic) Filip Duda (Czech Republic) Robin Staněk	(Germany) Peter Heller (Germany) Peter Torebko (Czech Republic) Jiří Jeníček (Czech Republic) Ondřej Krstev
November 26	Czech Republic F12 Futures; Prague, Czech Republic; Hard (indoor) $15,000; Singles and doubles draws	(Czech Republic) Marek Gengel (Czech Republic) Michal Konečný; 7–5, 6–2	(Czech Republic) Daniel Pátý (Czech Republic) Ondřej Štyler	(Czech Republic) Filip Duda (Czech Republic) Robin Staněk	(Germany) Peter Heller (Germany) Peter Torebko (Czech Republic) Jiří Jeníček (Czech Republic) Ondřej Krstev
November 26	Dominican Republic F1 Futures; Santo Domingo, Dominican Republic; Hard $15,000; Singles and doubles draws	(France) Baptiste Crepatte; 6–3, 6–2	(Dominican Republic) José Olivares	(Brazil) Oscar José Gutierrez (Chile) Alejandro Tabilo	(United States) Maksim Tikhomirov (Venezuela) Ricardo Rodríguez (Brazil) José Pereira (Switzerland) Aaron Schmid
November 26	Dominican Republic F1 Futures; Santo Domingo, Dominican Republic; Hard $15,000; Singles and doubles draws	(United States) A.J. Catanzariti (Antigua and Barbuda) Jody Maginley; 5–7, 6–3, [10–7]	(Switzerland) Luca Castelnuovo (France) Baptiste Crepatte	(Brazil) Oscar José Gutierrez (Chile) Alejandro Tabilo	(United States) Maksim Tikhomirov (Venezuela) Ricardo Rodríguez (Brazil) José Pereira (Switzerland) Aaron Schmid
November 26	Egypt F29 Futures; Cairo, Egypt; Clay $15,000; Singles and doubles draws	(Egypt) Youssef Hossam; 4–6, 6–2, 6–3	(France) Matthieu Perchicot	(Italy) Fabrizio Ornago (Czech Republic) Jaroslav Pospíšil	(Russia) Alexander Igoshin (France) Samuel Brosset (Argentina) Facundo Juárez (Venezuela) Jordi Muñoz Abreu
November 26	Egypt F29 Futures; Cairo, Egypt; Clay $15,000; Singles and doubles draws	(Russia) Alexander Igoshin (Portugal) Bernardo Saraiva; 6–4, 6–2	(Venezuela) Jordi Muñoz Abreu (Italy) Fabrizio Ornago	(Italy) Fabrizio Ornago (Czech Republic) Jaroslav Pospíšil	(Russia) Alexander Igoshin (France) Samuel Brosset (Argentina) Facundo Juárez (Venezuela) Jordi Muñoz Abreu
November 26	South Africa F2 Futures; Stellenbosch, South Africa; Hard $15,000; Singles and doubles draws	(United Kingdom) Toby Martin; 7–5, 7–6^{(7–5)}	(United States) Connor Farren	(Austria) David Pichler (Hungary) Péter Nagy	(United Kingdom) Patrick Foley (Hong Kong) Skyler Butts (United Kingdom) Samm Butler (Germany) Sebastian Prechtel
November 26	South Africa F2 Futures; Stellenbosch, South Africa; Hard $15,000; Singles and doubles draws	(Hungary) Gábor Borsos (Hungary) Péter Nagy; 7–6^{(7–1)}, 6–2	(Zimbabwe) Benjamin Lock (Zimbabwe) Courtney John Lock	(Austria) David Pichler (Hungary) Péter Nagy	(United Kingdom) Patrick Foley (Hong Kong) Skyler Butts (United Kingdom) Samm Butler (Germany) Sebastian Prechtel
November 26	Tunisia F42 Futures; Monastir, Tunisia; Hard $15,000; Singles and doubles draws	(Russia) Aslan Karatsev; 6–4, 4–6, 6–1	(France) Alexandre Müller	(United Kingdom) Luke Johnson (Tunisia) Moez Echargui	(Netherlands) Stephan Gerritsen (Italy) Giorgio Ricca (United Kingdom) Evan Hoyt (Ukraine) Vadym Ursu
November 26	Tunisia F42 Futures; Monastir, Tunisia; Hard $15,000; Singles and doubles draws	(Italy) Erik Crepaldi (Italy) Giorgio Ricca; 2–6, 6–3, [10–5]	(Argentina) Franco Emanuel Egea (Germany) Jakob Sude	(United Kingdom) Luke Johnson (Tunisia) Moez Echargui	(Netherlands) Stephan Gerritsen (Italy) Giorgio Ricca (United Kingdom) Evan Hoyt (Ukraine) Vadym Ursu
November 26	Turkey F38 Futures; Antalya, Turkey; Clay $15,000; Singles and doubles draws	(Russia) Ronald Slobodchikov; 6–2, 7–5	(Romania) Edris Fetisleam	(Russia) Vladimir Korolev (Argentina) Gerónimo Espín Busleiman	(Belgium) Jeroen Vanneste (Serbia) Dejan Katić (Belgium) Benjamin D'Hoe (Poland) Maciej Rajski
November 26	Turkey F38 Futures; Antalya, Turkey; Clay $15,000; Singles and doubles draws	(Brazil) Wilson Leite (Belgium) Jeroen Vanneste; 6–2, 6–2	(South Korea) Jeong Yeong-seok (South Korea) Park Ui-sung	(Russia) Vladimir Korolev (Argentina) Gerónimo Espín Busleiman	(Belgium) Jeroen Vanneste (Serbia) Dejan Katić (Belgium) Benjamin D'Hoe (Poland) Maciej Rajski

=== December ===
Week of	Tournament	Winner	Runners-up	Semifinalists	Quarterfinalists
December 3	Cameroon F2 Futures; Yaoundé, Cameroon; Hard $25,000; Singles and doubles draws	(France) Corentin Denolly; 7–6^{(7–3)}, 6–4	(Tunisia) Skander Mansouri	(France) Sadio Doumbia (France) Evan Furness	(France) Lény Mitjana (Tunisia) Aziz Dougaz (Brazil) Diego Matos (New Zealand) Alexander Klintcharov
December 3	Cameroon F2 Futures; Yaoundé, Cameroon; Hard $25,000; Singles and doubles draws	(Tunisia) Aziz Dougaz (Tunisia) Skander Mansouri; 6–4, 6–2	(France) Sadio Doumbia (Brazil) Diego Matos	(France) Sadio Doumbia (France) Evan Furness	(France) Lény Mitjana (Tunisia) Aziz Dougaz (Brazil) Diego Matos (New Zealand) Alexander Klintcharov
December 3	USA F35 Futures; Tallahassee, United States; Hard (indoor) $25,000; Singles and doubles draws	(France) Maxime Cressy; 6–4, 7–6^{(7–4)}	(United Kingdom) Ryan Peniston	(United States) Jordi Arconada (The Bahamas) Justin Roberts	(Lebanon) Hady Habib (United States) Felix Corwin (United Kingdom) Mark Whitehouse (Kazakhstan) Dmitry Popko
December 3	USA F35 Futures; Tallahassee, United States; Hard (indoor) $25,000; Singles and doubles draws	(United States) Jordi Arconada (Belgium) Michael Geerts; 6–3, 7–6^{(7–0)}	(United States) Felix Corwin (United States) Jacob Dunbar	(United States) Jordi Arconada (The Bahamas) Justin Roberts	(Lebanon) Hady Habib (United States) Felix Corwin (United Kingdom) Mark Whitehouse (Kazakhstan) Dmitry Popko
December 3	Dominican Republic F2 Futures; Santo Domingo, Dominican Republic; Hard $15,000; Singles and doubles draws	(Chile) Alejandro Tabilo; 6–3, 6–3	(Dominican Republic) José Olivares	(France) Baptiste Crepatte (Peru) Jorge Panta	(United States) Omni Kumar (Peru) Mauricio Echazú (Sweden) Simon Freund (Dominican Republic) Peter Bertran
December 3	Dominican Republic F2 Futures; Santo Domingo, Dominican Republic; Hard $15,000; Singles and doubles draws	(Peru) Arklon Huertas del Pino (Peru) Conner Huertas del Pino; 6–2, 6–3	(United States) A.J. Catanzariti (Antigua and Barbuda) Jody Maginley	(France) Baptiste Crepatte (Peru) Jorge Panta	(United States) Omni Kumar (Peru) Mauricio Echazú (Sweden) Simon Freund (Dominican Republic) Peter Bertran
December 3	Egypt F30 Futures; Cairo, Egypt; Clay $15,000; Singles and doubles draws	(Italy) Riccardo Bonadio; 6–2, 6–0	(Czech Republic) Vít Kopřiva	(Brazil) Jordan Correia (Italy) Fabrizio Ornago	(France) Matthieu Perchicot (Ukraine) Vladyslav Manafov (Egypt) Youssef Hossam (United States) Dennis Uspensky
December 3	Egypt F30 Futures; Cairo, Egypt; Clay $15,000; Singles and doubles draws	(Czech Republic) Vít Kopřiva (Czech Republic) Jaroslav Pospíšil; 6–2, 6–2	(Switzerland) Louroi Martinez (Switzerland) Damien Wenger	(Brazil) Jordan Correia (Italy) Fabrizio Ornago	(France) Matthieu Perchicot (Ukraine) Vladyslav Manafov (Egypt) Youssef Hossam (United States) Dennis Uspensky
December 3	Pakistan F1 Futures; Islamabad, Pakistan; Hard $15,000; Singles and doubles draws	(South Korea) Kim Cheong-eui; 6–7^{(3–7)}, 6–2, 6–1	(Japan) Rio Noguchi	(Chinese Taipei) Chen Ti (United Kingdom) Alexis Canter	(Uzbekistan) Saida'lo Saidkarimov (Pakistan) Muhammad Abid (Japan) Sora Fukuda (Germany) Kai Wehnelt
December 3	Pakistan F1 Futures; Islamabad, Pakistan; Hard $15,000; Singles and doubles draws	(South Korea) Kim Cheong-eui (Japan) Rio Noguchi; 6–2, 6–4	(Serbia) Darko Jandrić (Uzbekistan) Shonigmatjon Shofayziyev	(Chinese Taipei) Chen Ti (United Kingdom) Alexis Canter	(Uzbekistan) Saida'lo Saidkarimov (Pakistan) Muhammad Abid (Japan) Sora Fukuda (Germany) Kai Wehnelt
December 3	Qatar F4 Futures; Doha, Qatar; Hard $15,000; Singles and doubles draws	(Portugal) Gonçalo Oliveira; 6–3, 7–5	(Russia) Aslan Karatsev	(Russia) Evgenii Tiurnev (Greece) Michail Pervolarakis	(Portugal) Bernardo Saraiva (Croatia) Duje Ajduković (United States) Peter Kobelt (Belgium) Zizou Bergs
December 3	Qatar F4 Futures; Doha, Qatar; Hard $15,000; Singles and doubles draws	(Russia) Alexander Igoshin (Russia) Evgenii Tiurnev; 7–6^{(14–12)}, 6–3	(Portugal) Gonçalo Oliveira (Portugal) Bernardo Saraiva	(Russia) Evgenii Tiurnev (Greece) Michail Pervolarakis	(Portugal) Bernardo Saraiva (Croatia) Duje Ajduković (United States) Peter Kobelt (Belgium) Zizou Bergs
December 3	South Africa F3 Futures; Stellenbosch, South Africa; Hard $15,000; Singles and doubles draws	(Zimbabwe) Benjamin Lock; 6–7^{(3–7)}, 6–3, 6–2	(South Africa) Ruan Roelofse	(Poland) Michał Dembek (Poland) Maciej Smoła	(France) Jean Thirouin (United Kingdom) Toby Martin (Germany) Sebastian Prechtel (South Africa) Nicolaas Scholtz
December 3	South Africa F3 Futures; Stellenbosch, South Africa; Hard $15,000; Singles and doubles draws	(Austria) David Pichler (Germany) Sebastian Prechtel; 6–3, 7–5	(Poland) Daniel Kossek (Poland) Maciej Smoła	(Poland) Michał Dembek (Poland) Maciej Smoła	(France) Jean Thirouin (United Kingdom) Toby Martin (Germany) Sebastian Prechtel (South Africa) Nicolaas Scholtz
December 3	Tunisia F43 Futures; Monastir, Tunisia; Hard $15,000; Singles and doubles draws	(Canada) Steven Diez; 6–2, 6–3	(France) Gabriel Petit	(Italy) Julian Ocleppo (United Kingdom) Evan Hoyt	(Ukraine) Vadym Ursu (Italy) Marco Miceli (United Kingdom) Luke Johnson (Russia) Yan Bondarevskiy
December 3	Tunisia F43 Futures; Monastir, Tunisia; Hard $15,000; Singles and doubles draws	(United Kingdom) Evan Hoyt (United Kingdom) Luke Johnson; 6–4, 6–2	(Italy) Marco Bortolotti (Canada) Steven Diez	(Italy) Julian Ocleppo (United Kingdom) Evan Hoyt	(Ukraine) Vadym Ursu (Italy) Marco Miceli (United Kingdom) Luke Johnson (Russia) Yan Bondarevskiy
December 3	Turkey F39 Futures; Antalya, Turkey; Clay $15,000; Singles and doubles draws	(Brazil) Wilson Leite; 6–3, 6–4	(Serbia) Dejan Katić	(Spain) Oriol Roca Batalla (Russia) Pavel Kotov	(Netherlands) Bart Stevens (Russia) Vladimir Korolev (Bosnia and Herzegovina) Nerman Fatić (Russia) Alexander Boborykin
December 3	Turkey F39 Futures; Antalya, Turkey; Clay $15,000; Singles and doubles draws	(Bosnia and Herzegovina) Nerman Fatić (Spain) Oriol Roca Batalla; 6–3, 6–3	(Brazil) Wilson Leite (Belgium) Jeroen Vanneste	(Spain) Oriol Roca Batalla (Russia) Pavel Kotov	(Netherlands) Bart Stevens (Russia) Vladimir Korolev (Bosnia and Herzegovina) Nerman Fatić (Russia) Alexander Boborykin
December 10	Dominican Republic F3 Futures; Santo Domingo, Dominican Republic; Hard $15,000; Singles and doubles draws	(Dominican Republic) Nick Hardt; 7–5, 6–3	(Chile) Alejandro Tabilo	(Brazil) Oscar José Gutierrez (Peru) Arklon Huertas del Pino	(United States) Maksim Tikhomirov (Peru) Conner Huertas del Pino (The Bahamas) Baker Newman (Argentina) Tomás Martín Etcheverry
December 10	Dominican Republic F3 Futures; Santo Domingo, Dominican Republic; Hard $15,000; Singles and doubles draws	(Argentina) Tomás Martín Etcheverry (Brazil) Oscar José Gutierrez; 6–3, 6–2	(Peru) Arklon Huertas del Pino (Peru) Conner Huertas del Pino	(Brazil) Oscar José Gutierrez (Peru) Arklon Huertas del Pino	(United States) Maksim Tikhomirov (Peru) Conner Huertas del Pino (The Bahamas) Baker Newman (Argentina) Tomás Martín Etcheverry
December 10	Egypt F31 Futures; Cairo, Egypt; Clay $15,000; Singles and doubles draws	(Egypt) Youssef Hossam; 6–3, 2–6, 6–0	(France) Matthieu Perchicot	(Italy) Riccardo Bonadio (France) Samuel Brosset	(Ukraine) Vladyslav Manafov (Italy) Luca Prevosto (Belgium) Omar Salman (Italy) Stefano Battaglino
December 10	Egypt F31 Futures; Cairo, Egypt; Clay $15,000; Singles and doubles draws	(Ukraine) Vladyslav Manafov (Lebanon) Giovani Samaha; 6–3, 6–4	(Switzerland) Louroi Martinez (Switzerland) Damien Wenger	(Italy) Riccardo Bonadio (France) Samuel Brosset	(Ukraine) Vladyslav Manafov (Italy) Luca Prevosto (Belgium) Omar Salman (Italy) Stefano Battaglino
December 10	Pakistan F2 Futures; Islamabad, Pakistan; Hard $15,000; Singles and doubles draws	(South Korea) Kim Cheong-eui; 6–2, 6–2	(Germany) Kai Wehnelt	(Japan) Sora Fukuda (Japan) Rio Noguchi	(United Kingdom) Alexis Canter (Serbia) Darko Jandrić (Italy) Lorenzo Bocchi (Iran) Hamidreza Nadaf
December 10	Pakistan F2 Futures; Islamabad, Pakistan; Hard $15,000; Singles and doubles draws	(Serbia) Darko Jandrić (South Korea) Kim Cheong-eui; 6–3, 6–4	(Japan) Sora Fukuda (Japan) Rio Noguchi	(Japan) Sora Fukuda (Japan) Rio Noguchi	(United Kingdom) Alexis Canter (Serbia) Darko Jandrić (Italy) Lorenzo Bocchi (Iran) Hamidreza Nadaf
December 10	Qatar F5 Futures; Doha, Qatar; Hard $15,000; Singles and doubles draws	(France) Tak Khunn Wang; 6–3, 6–3	(Portugal) Gonçalo Oliveira	(Bulgaria) Alexandar Lazarov (Spain) Jaume Pla Malfeito	(Russia) Aslan Karatsev (Greece) Michail Pervolarakis (Italy) Adelchi Virgili (Switzerland) Antoine Bellier
December 10	Qatar F5 Futures; Doha, Qatar; Hard $15,000; Singles and doubles draws	(Portugal) Gonçalo Oliveira (Portugal) Bernardo Saraiva; 4–6, 6–3, [13–11]	(Italy) Adelchi Virgili (Qatar) Mubarak Shannan Zayid	(Bulgaria) Alexandar Lazarov (Spain) Jaume Pla Malfeito	(Russia) Aslan Karatsev (Greece) Michail Pervolarakis (Italy) Adelchi Virgili (Switzerland) Antoine Bellier
December 10	Tunisia F44 Futures; Monastir, Tunisia; Hard $15,000; Singles and doubles draws	(France) Manuel Guinard; 7–5, 6–4	(Tunisia) Aziz Dougaz	(Russia) Bogdan Bobrov (Italy) Julian Ocleppo	(Russia) Yan Bondarevskiy (Switzerland) Riccardo Maiga (Italy) Marco Bortolotti (France) Antoine Cornut-Chauvinc
December 10	Tunisia F44 Futures; Monastir, Tunisia; Hard $15,000; Singles and doubles draws	(Tunisia) Aziz Dougaz (Portugal) Fred Gil; 6–1, 6–3	(Austria) Alexander Erler (Germany) Christian Hirschmüller	(Russia) Bogdan Bobrov (Italy) Julian Ocleppo	(Russia) Yan Bondarevskiy (Switzerland) Riccardo Maiga (Italy) Marco Bortolotti (France) Antoine Cornut-Chauvinc
December 10	Turkey F40 Futures; Antalya, Turkey; Clay $15,000; Singles and doubles draws	(Spain) Oriol Roca Batalla; 6–1, 6–2	(Russia) Ronald Slobodchikov	(Sweden) Dragoș Nicolae Mădăraș (Serbia) Dejan Katić	(Czech Republic) Tadeáš Paroulek (Poland) Maciej Rajski (North Macedonia) Gorazd Srbljak (Russia) Pavel Kotov
December 10	Turkey F40 Futures; Antalya, Turkey; Clay $15,000; Singles and doubles draws	(Sweden) Dragoș Nicolae Mădăraș (Czech Republic) Tadeáš Paroulek; Walkover	(Netherlands) Mats Hermans (Netherlands) Bart Stevens	(Sweden) Dragoș Nicolae Mădăraș (Serbia) Dejan Katić	(Czech Republic) Tadeáš Paroulek (Poland) Maciej Rajski (North Macedonia) Gorazd Srbljak (Russia) Pavel Kotov
December 17	Pakistan F3 Futures; Islamabad, Pakistan; Clay $15,000; Singles and doubles draws	(Germany) Kai Wehnelt; 6–1, 7–5	(Japan) Rio Noguchi	(Uzbekistan) Saida'lo Saidkarimov (Iran) Hamidreza Nadaf	(United Kingdom) Shamael Chaudhry (United Kingdom) Alexis Canter (Italy) Lorenzo Bocchi (Chinese Taipei) Ray Ho
December 17	Pakistan F3 Futures; Islamabad, Pakistan; Clay $15,000; Singles and doubles draws	(Russia) Anton Chekhov (Germany) Kai Wehnelt; 6–3, 7–5	(Japan) Rio Noguchi (Japan) Ken Onishi	(Uzbekistan) Saida'lo Saidkarimov (Iran) Hamidreza Nadaf	(United Kingdom) Shamael Chaudhry (United Kingdom) Alexis Canter (Italy) Lorenzo Bocchi (Chinese Taipei) Ray Ho
December 17	Qatar F6 Futures; Doha, Qatar; Hard $15,000; Singles and doubles draws	(Italy) Lorenzo Frigerio; 2–6, 6–4, 7–5	(Russia) Aslan Karatsev	(Belgium) Zizou Bergs (Netherlands) Jesper de Jong	(Germany) Constantin Schmitz (Portugal) Bernardo Saraiva (Greece) Michail Pervolarakis (Bulgaria) Alexandar Lazarov
December 17	Qatar F6 Futures; Doha, Qatar; Hard $15,000; Singles and doubles draws	(Russia) Alexander Igoshin (Portugal) Bernardo Saraiva; 6–2, 6–4	(Belarus) Mikalai Haliak (Russia) Alexander Zhurbin	(Belgium) Zizou Bergs (Netherlands) Jesper de Jong	(Germany) Constantin Schmitz (Portugal) Bernardo Saraiva (Greece) Michail Pervolarakis (Bulgaria) Alexandar Lazarov
December 17	Tunisia F45 Futures; Monastir, Tunisia; Hard $15,000; Singles and doubles draws	(Canada) Steven Diez; 6–3, 7–6^{(7–3)}	(France) Clément Tabur	(Tunisia) Aziz Dougaz (France) Manuel Guinard	(Germany) Christian Hirschmüller (Italy) Walter Trusendi (Russia) Bogdan Bobrov (United Kingdom) Jack Findel-Hawkins
December 17	Tunisia F45 Futures; Monastir, Tunisia; Hard $15,000; Singles and doubles draws	(Tunisia) Aziz Dougaz (Portugal) Fred Gil; 5–7, 6–4, [13–11]	(Italy) Erik Crepaldi (France) Hugo Voljacques	(Tunisia) Aziz Dougaz (France) Manuel Guinard	(Germany) Christian Hirschmüller (Italy) Walter Trusendi (Russia) Bogdan Bobrov (United Kingdom) Jack Findel-Hawkins
December 17	Turkey F41 Futures; Antalya, Turkey; Clay $15,000; Singles and doubles draws	(Russia) Ivan Nedelko; 1–6, 7–6^{(7–3)}, 6–3	(Spain) Oriol Roca Batalla	(Russia) Pavel Kotov (Uzbekistan) Sanjar Fayziev	(North Macedonia) Gorazd Srbljak (Russia) Ronald Slobodchikov (Serbia) Dejan Katić (Russia) Markos Kalovelonis
December 17	Turkey F41 Futures; Antalya, Turkey; Clay $15,000; Singles and doubles draws	(Uzbekistan) Sanjar Fayziev (Russia) Markos Kalovelonis; 7–5, 3–6, [10–6]	(Czech Republic) Tadeáš Paroulek (Ukraine) Oleg Prihodko	(Russia) Pavel Kotov (Uzbekistan) Sanjar Fayziev	(North Macedonia) Gorazd Srbljak (Russia) Ronald Slobodchikov (Serbia) Dejan Katić (Russia) Markos Kalovelonis
December 24	Hong Kong F3 Futures; Hong Kong; Hard $25,000; Singles and doubles draws	(Kazakhstan) Denis Yevseyev; 6–4, 1–6, 6–4	(China) Gao Xin	(France) Alexandre Müller (Russia) Aslan Karatsev	(Thailand) Wishaya Trongcharoenchaikul (Italy) Riccardo Bonadio (Switzerland) Luca Castelnuovo (France) Arthur Rinderknech
December 24	Hong Kong F3 Futures; Hong Kong; Hard $25,000; Singles and doubles draws	(Chinese Taipei) Hsu Yu-hsiou (Japan) Shintaro Imai; 7–6^{(7–1)}, 6–1	(China) Gao Xin (China) Wang Aoran	(France) Alexandre Müller (Russia) Aslan Karatsev	(Thailand) Wishaya Trongcharoenchaikul (Italy) Riccardo Bonadio (Switzerland) Luca Castelnuovo (France) Arthur Rinderknech
