= Shahdali Sib Ali =

Village in Kohgiluyeh and Boyer-Ahmad, Iran

Shahdali Sib Ali شهدالي سلبعلي
- Village
- Location within Iran
- Coordinates: 31°09′08″N 50°41′33″E
- Country: Iran
- Province: Kohgiluyeh and Boyer-Ahmad
- County: Boyer-Ahmad
- Bakhsh: Ludab
- Rural District: Chin

Population (2006)
  - Total: 23
- Time zone: UTC+3:30 (IRST)
  - Summer (DST): UTC+4:30 (IRDT)

Shahdali Sib Ali (Persian: شهدالي سلبعلي, also Romanized as Shahdālī Slb ʿAlī; also known as Shahdālī and Shahdālī-ye Soflá) is a village in Chin Rural District, Ludab District, Boyer-Ahmad County, Kohgiluyeh and Boyer-Ahmad Province, Iran. At the 2006 census, its population was 23, in 6 families.
