= Edris Saint-Amand =

Edris Saint-Amand (born 26 March 1918; died 9 february 2004) was a Haitian novelist. Born in Gonaïves, one of Saint-Amand's most notable novels is Bon Dieu Rit (1952).

He was the Ambassador to Argentina until his death in 2004.
