= Shahdali Edris =

Shahdali Edris شهدالي ادريس
- Village
- Location within Iran
- Coordinates: 31°07′52″N 50°42′39″E
- Country: Iran
- Province: Kohgiluyeh and Boyer-Ahmad
- County: Boyer-Ahmad
- Bakhsh: Ludab
- Rural District: Chin

Population (2006)
  - Total: 30
- Time zone: UTC+3:30 (IRST)
  - Summer (DST): UTC+4:30 (IRDT)

Shahdali Edris (Persian: شهدالي ادريس, also Romanized as Shahdālī Edrīs; also known as Shahdālī and Shahdālī-ye Vosţá) is a village in Chin Rural District, Ludab District, Boyer-Ahmad County, Kohgiluyeh and Boyer-Ahmad Province, Iran. At the 2006 census, its population was 30, in 6 families.
