= Edris Fetisleam =

Romanian tennis player

- Country (sports): Romania
- Residence: Romania
- Born: 25 July 1999 (age 27) Romania
- Prize money: $15,412

Singles
- Career record: 1–0 (at ATP Tour level, Grand Slam level, and in Davis Cup)
- Career titles: 2 ITF
- Highest ranking: No. 673 (14 October 2019)

Doubles
- Career record: 0–0 (at ATP Tour level, Grand Slam level, and in Davis Cup)
- Career titles: 0 ITF
- Highest ranking: No. 1,029 (5 August 2019)
- Last updated on: 8 April 2017.

Edris Fetisleam (Dobrujan Tatar: Edris Fetislam; born 25 July 1999) is a Romanian professional tennis player. He is of Tatar descent.

Fetisleam has a career high ATP singles ranking of 673 achieved on 14 October 2019. He also has a career high ATP doubles ranking of 1,029 achieved on 5 August 2019.

Fetisleam represents Romania at the Davis Cup making his debut on 8 April 2018 against Morocco's Yassir Kilani.

== Davis Cup ==
=== Singles performances (1–0) ===
Edition	Round	Date	Against	Surface	Opponent	Win/Lose	Result
2018 Europe/Africa Zone Group II	2R	7–8 April	Morocco	Hard (i)	(Morocco) Yassir Kilani	Win	6–2, 6–0
